= 2015–16 Hibernian F.C. season =

Hibernian
2015–16 season
- Chairman: Rod Petrie
- Manager: Alan Stubbs
- Stadium: Easter Road
- Championship: Third place
- Scottish Cup: Winners
- League Cup: Runners-up, lost to Ross County
- Challenge Cup: First round, lost to Rangers
- Top goalscorer: League: Jason Cummings (18); All: Jason Cummings (25)
Home colours	Away colours

The 2015–16 season is Hibernian's (Hibs) second season of play in the second tier of Scottish football the Scottish Championship, since they were relegated at the end of the 2013–14 season. Hibs also competed in the Challenge Cup, the Scottish League Cup and the Scottish Cup.

== Summary ==
=== Season ===
Hibernian finished third in the Championship. They reached the first round of the Challenge Cup, the final of the League Cup and the final of the Scottish Cup, beating Rangers 3–2, ending a 114-year wait for the trophy.

== Results & fixtures ==
Win Draw Loss Postponed

=== Friendlies ===
14 July 2015 Friendly	Berwick Rangers	0–3	Hibernian	Shielfield Park
19:45		Hibernian Report	Gray 16'; Cummings 55'; Allan 60'	Attendance: 1,080; Referee: Colvin

18 July 2015 Friendly	Dunfermline Athletic	1–2	Hibernian	East End Park
15:00	El Bakhtaoui 75'; Talbot (red card) 18'	Hibernian Report	Allan 34'; Stevenson 51'	Attendance: 3,337; Referee: Walsh

21 July 2015 Friendly	Ayr United	0–0	Hibernian	Somerset Park
19:45		Hibernian Report		Attendance: 923; Referee: Graham

=== Scottish Championship ===
8 August 2015 Championship	Dumbarton	2–1	Hibernian	Dumbarton Football Stadium
15:00	Buchanan 3'; Gibson 55'	BBC Report	Malonga 14'	Attendance: 1,552; Referee: Robertson

15 August 2015 Championship	Hibernian	1–0	Greenock Morton	Easter Road
15:00	Cummings 58'	BBC Report		Attendance: 8,923; Referee: Charleston

23 August 2015 Championship	Rangers	1–0	Hibernian	Ibrox Stadium
12:30	Tavernier 66'	BBC Report		Attendance: 49,220; Referee: McLean

29 August 2015 Championship	Hibernian	2–0	Raith Rovers	Easter Road
15:00	Keatings 22'; Cummings 50'	BBC Report		Attendance: 8,484; Referee: Muir

12 September 2015 Championship	Hibernian	3–0	Alloa Athletic	Easter Road
15:00	Henderson 44'; Cummings 50'; McGinn 65'	BBC Report		Attendance: 7,774; Referee: McKendrick

19 September 2015 Championship	Livingston	0–1	Hibernian	Almondvale Stadium
15:00		BBC Report	Henderson 50'	Attendance: 3,007; Referee: Cook

26 September 2015 Championship	Hibernian	1–1	St Mirren	Easter Road
15:00	Boyle 42'	BBC Report	Gallagher 18'	Attendance: 8,911; Referee: Allan

3 October 2015 Championship	Queen of the South	0–3	Hibernian	Palmerston Park
15:00		BBC Report	Cummings 3'; Henderson 41'; Boyle 89'	Attendance: 2,745; Referee: Aitken

17 October 2015 Championship	Hibernian	4–2	Dumbarton	Easter Road
15:00	Malonga 21'; Fontaine 26'; Cummings 43' (pen.); Keatings 60'	BBC Report	Gallagher 22'; Craig 74'	Attendance: 8,221; Referee: Colvin

20 October 2015 Championship	Falkirk	0–1	Hibernian	Falkirk Stadium
19:45		BBC Report	Cummings 40' (pen.)	Attendance: 5,429; Referee: Muir

24 October 2015 Championship	Raith Rovers	1–2	Hibernian	Stark's Park
15:00	Daly 64'	BBC Report	McGinn 4'; Cummings 26'	Attendance: 4,114; Referee: Salmond

1 November 2015 Championship	Hibernian	2–1	Rangers	Easter Road
12:30	Cummings 11'; Hanlon 73'	BBC Report	McGregor 47' (o.g.)	Attendance: 14,412; Referee: Beaton

7 November 2015 Championship	St Mirren	1–4	Hibernian	St Mirren Park
15:00	Kelly 8'	BBC Report	Cummings 10'; Keatings 37', 48', 78' (pen.)	Attendance: 4,503; Referee: Dallas

17 November 2015 Championship	Hibernian	2–1	Livingston	Easter Road
19:45	Keatings 52', 69'	BBC Report	Sheerin 87'	Attendance: 7,801; Referee: Thomson

21 November 2015 Championship	Alloa Athletic	0–1	Hibernian	Recreation Park
15:00		BBC Report	Cummings 60'	Attendance: 1,952; Referee: Cook

12 December 2015 Championship	Hibernian	1–1	Falkirk	Easter Road
15:00	Boyle 90'	BBC Report	Miller 84'	Attendance: 9,459; Referee: Clancy

19 December 2015 Championship	Hibernian	1–0	Queen of the South	Easter Road
15:00	Malonga 90+4'	BBC Report		Attendance: 9,163; Referee: Colvin

28 December 2015 Championship	Rangers	4–2	Hibernian	Ibrox Stadium
15:00	Holt 33', 43'; Clark 65'; Waghorn 89'	BBC Report	Cummings 23'; Malonga 86'	Attendance: 49,995; Referee: Madden

2 January 2016 Championship	Hibernian	1–0	Raith Rovers	Easter Road
15:00	Cummings 50'	BBC Report	Anderson (yellow card) 90+1' (red card)	Attendance: 10,994; Referee: Salmond

17 January 2016 Championship	Falkirk	1–1	Hibernian	Falkirk Stadium
15:00	Alston 49'	BBC Report	Cummings 73'	Attendance: 7,081; Referee: Beaton

23 January 2016 Championship	Hibernian	3–1	St Mirren	Easter Road
15:00	Henderson 10'; McGinn 44'; Stokes 90'	BBC Report	Mallan 45+2'	Attendance: 10,160; Referee: Robertson

2 February 2016 Championship	Greenock Morton	0–1	Hibernian	Cappielow
19:45		BBC Report	Stokes 47'	Attendance: 2,696; Referee: McKendrick

13 February 2016 Championship	Livingston	0–0	Hibernian	Almondvale Stadium
17:15		BBC Report		Attendance: 2,663; Referee: Muir

21 February 2016 Championship	Hibernian	3–0	Alloa Athletic	Easter Road
13:30	Boyle 5,77' Carmichael 40'	BBC Report		Attendance: 8,765; Referee: Walsh

24 February 2016 Championship	Hibernian	0–3	Greenock Morton	Easter Road
		BBC Report	O'Ware 36'; Johnstone 51'; Forbes 63'	Attendance: 8,655; Referee: McLean

27 February 2016 Championship	Dumbarton	3–2	Hibernian	Dumbarton Football Stadium
	Cawley 21'; Nade 42'; Barr 49'	BBC Report	Henderson 57'; El Alagui 71'	Attendance: 1,345; Referee: Cook

1 March 2016 Championship	Queen of the South	1–0	Hibernian	Palmerston Park
19:45	Murdoch 78'	BBC Report		Attendance: 2,017; Referee: Dallas

19 March 2016 Championship	Raith Rovers	2–1	Hibernian	Stark's Park
19:45	Toshney 38'; Stewart 53'	BBC Report	Stokes 25'	Attendance: 2,386; Referee: McKendrick

2 April 2016 Championship	St Mirren	2–2	Hibernian	St Mirren Park
15:00	Quinn 35'; Shankland 57'	BBC Report	Cummings 27'; El Alagui 89'	Attendance: 3,765; Referee: Charleston

5 April 2016 Championship	Hibernian	2–1	Livingston	Easter Road
19:45	Stokes 75'; Boyle 78'	BBC Report	White 23'	Attendance: 7,289; Referee: Cook

9 April 2016 Championship	Alloa Athletic	1–0	Hibernian	Recreation Park
15:00		BBC Report	Duffy 45'	Attendance: 1,364; Referee: Madden

12 April 2016 Championship	Hibernian	2–2	Falkirk	Easter Road
	Cummings 10', 81' (pen.)	BBC Report	Muirhead (yellow card) 74' (yellow-red card); McCracken 87'; McHugh 90'	Attendance: 10,277; Referee: Allan

20 April 2016 Championship	Hibernian	3–2	Rangers	Easter Road
	Cummings 5'; Foderingham 18' (Own goal); Gunnarsson 58'	BBC Report	Holt 41'; McKay 85'	Attendance: 12,231; Referee: Clancy

23 April 2016 Championship	Greenock Morton	0–0	Hibernian	Cappielow
		BBC Report		Attendance: 2,308; Referee: Finnie

26 April 2016 Championship	Hibernian	4–0	Dumbarton	Easter Road
	Keatings 7', 13'; Cawley 75' (Own goal); Stokes 90+2'	BBC Report		Attendance: 6,686; Referee: Robertson

1 May 2016 Championship	Hibernian	2–0	Queen of the South	Easter Road
12:30	Gunnarsson 67'; Cummings 79'	BBC Report	Millar (red card) 55'	Attendance: 9,900; Referee: Salmond

=== Premiership play-offs ===
4 May 2015 Play-offs QF R1	Raith Rovers	1 – 0	Hibernian	Stark's Park
19:45	Panayiotou 75'	BBC Report		Attendance: 5,330; Referee: Clancy

7 May 2016 Play-offs QF R2	Hibernian	2 – 0 (2 – 1 agg.)	Raith Rovers	Easter Road
12:30	McGinn 8'; McGregor 12'	BBC Report		Attendance: 11,133; Referee: McKendrick

10 May 2016 Play-offs SF R1	Hibernian	2 – 2	Falkirk	Easter Road
19:45	Henderson 57'; McGregor 66'	BBC Report	Miller 34'; McHugh 80'	Attendance: 11,830; Referee: Muir

13 May 2016 Play-offs SF R2	Falkirk	3 – 2 (5 – 4 agg.)	Hibernian	Falkirk Stadium
19:45	Alston 13'; Leahy 79'; McHugh 90+2'	BBC Report	Keatings 31' (pen.), 34'	Attendance: 7,851; Referee: Thomson

=== Scottish Challenge Cup ===
25 July 2015 First round	Hibernian	2–6	Rangers	Easter Road
12:30	Stanton 14'; Cummings 61' (pen.)	BBC Report	Tavernier 39'; Waghorn 44', 47'; Halliday 62'; Miller 77', 82'	Attendance: 11,225; Referee: Collum

=== Scottish League Cup ===
1 August 2015 First round	Hibernian	3 – 0	Montrose	Easter Road
15:00	Martin 33'; Allan 71'; Cummings 82'	BBC Report		Attendance: 5,933; Referee: Beaton

26 August 2015 Second round	Hibernian	1 – 0	Stranraer	Easter Road
19:45	Rumsby 54' (Own goal)	BBC Report		Attendance: 5,224; Referee: Clancy

23 September 2015 Third Round	Hibernian	2 – 0	Aberdeen	Easter Road
19:45	Cummings 81'; Malonga 88'	BBC Report		Attendance: 11,092; Referee: McLean

4 November 2015 Quarter Final	Hibernian	3 – 0	Dundee United	Easter Road
19:45	Gray 20'; Cummings 61' (pen.); Stevenson 90+4'	BBC Report		Attendance: 11,891; Referee: Collum

30 January 2016 Semi Final	Hibernian	2 – 1	St Johnstone	Tynecastle
15:00	Cummings 29' (pen.); McGinn 74'	BBC Report	Shaughnessy 33'	Attendance: 16,971; Referee: McLean

13 March 2016 Final	Hibernian	1 – 2	Ross County	Hampden Park
15:00	Fontaine 45'	BBC Report	Gardyne 25'; Schalk 90'	Attendance: 38,796; Referee: Clancy

=== Scottish Cup ===
9 January 2016 Scottish Cup Fourth round	Raith Rovers	0–2	Hibernian	Stark's Park
15:00		BBC Report	McGregor 61'; Malonga 64'	Attendance: 5,203; Referee: Collum

7 February 2016 Scottish Cup Fifth round	Heart of Midlothian	2–2	Hibernian	Tynecastle Stadium
12:30	Djoum 32'; Nicholson 44'	BBC Report	Cummings 80'; Hanlon 90+1'	Attendance: 16,845; Referee: Thomson

16 February 2016 Scottish Cup Fifth round replay	Hibernian	1–0	Heart of Midlothian	Easter Road
19:45	Cummings 4'; Cummings (yellow card) 78' (red card)	BBC Report	Augustyn (yellow card) 76' (red card)	Attendance: 19,433; Referee: Beaton

6 March 2016 Scottish Cup Quarter-final	Hibernian	1–1	Inverness Caledonian Thistle	Easter Road
	Keatings 54'	BBC Report	Mbuyi-Mutombo 77'	Attendance: 9,884; Referee: Allan

16 March 2016 Scottish Cup Quarter-final replay	Inverness Caledonian Thistle	1–2	Hibernian	Caledonian Stadium
19:45	Vigurs 77'	BBC Report	Stokes 36', 41'	Attendance: 3,207; Referee: Finnie

16 April 2016 Scottish Cup Semi-final	Hibernian	0–0 (a.e.t.) (4–2 p)	Dundee United	Hampden Park
12:15		BBC Report		Attendance: 19,651; Referee: Beaton
	Penalties
	McGinn (penalty scored); Hanlon (penalty scored); Boyle (penalty scored); Cummings (penalty scored)		(penalty missed) Spittal; (penalty missed) McKay; (penalty scored) Dixon; (penalty scored) Demel

21 May 2016 Scottish Cup Final	Hibernian	3–2	Rangers	Hampden Park
15:00	Stokes 3', 80'; Gray 90+2'	BBC Report	Miller 27'; Halliday 64'	Attendance: 50,701; Referee: McLean

== Player statistics ==
During the 2015–16 season, Hibs have used thirty-three different players in competitive games. The table below shows the number of appearances and goals scored by each player. David Gray was appointed as club captain for the season, replacing Liam Craig.

As of 21 May 2016 (UTC)

No.	Pos	Nat	Player	Total		Championship		Other^{[a]}		League Cup		Scottish Cup	
No.	Pos	Nat	Player	Apps	Goals	Apps	Goals	Apps	Goals	Apps	Goals	Apps	Goals
1	GK	(England) ENG	Mark Oxley	45	0	33+0	0	1+0	0	6+0	0	5+0	0
2	DF	(Scotland) SCO	David Gray	46	2	29+1	0	5+0	0	5+0	1	6+0	1
3	MF	(Scotland) SCO	Liam Henderson	47	6	26+5	5	3+1	1	5+0	0	5+2	0
4	DF	(Scotland) SCO	Paul Hanlon	43	2	27+1	1	5+0	0	5+0	0	5+0	1
5	DF	(England) ENG	Liam Fontaine	39	2	22+4	1	2+1	0	6+0	1	4+0	0
6	DF	(England) ENG	Marvin Bartley	36	0	20+5	0	1+2	0	2+1	0	5+0	0
7	FW	(Republic of the Congo) CGO	Dominique Malonga	23	6	13+6	4	1+0	0	1+1	1	1+0	1
8	MF	(Scotland) SCO	Fraser Fyvie	32	0	20+1	0	5+0	0	4+0	0	2+0	0
9	FW	(France) FRA	Farid El Alagui	7	2	0+5	2	0+0	0	0+1	0	0+1	0
10	MF	(Scotland) SCO	Scott Allan	3	1	1+0	0	0+1	0	0+1	1	0+0	0
10	MF	(Scotland) SCO	Dylan McGeouch	30	0	14+5	0	3+1	0	3+0	0	4+0	0
11	MF	(Scotland) SCO	Sam Stanton	6	1	0+4	0	1+0	1	1+0	0	0+0	0
16	DF	(Scotland) SCO	Lewis Stevenson	52	1	34+0	0	5+0	0	6+0	1	7+0	0
17	FW	(Scotland) SCO	Martin Boyle	32	5	12+12	5	0+1	0	2+2	0	0+3	0
18	MF	(Scotland) SCO	John McGinn	51	5	32+3	3	4+0	1	5+0	1	7+0	0
19	FW	(Scotland) SCO	James Keatings	40	11	18+9	8	1+3	2	1+3	0	3+2	1
20	FW	(Scotland) SCO	Islam Feruz	6	0	0+6	0	0+0	0	0+0	0	0+0	0
21	DF	(Scotland) SCO	Dan Carmichael	9	1	4+2	1	0+0	0	0+2	0	0+1	0
22	FW	(Estonia) EST	Henri Anier	3	0	0+3	0	0+0	0	0+0	0	0+0	0
23	MF	(Scotland) SCO	Jordon Forster	1	0	0+0	0	1+0	0	0+0	0	0+0	0
24	DF	(Scotland) SCO	Darren McGregor	43	3	23+4	0	4+0	2	3+2	0	6+1	1
25	GK	(Republic of Ireland) IRL	Conrad Logan	8	0	2+0	0	4+0	0	0+0	0	2+0	0
27	DF	(Norway) NOR	Niklas Gunnarsson	14	2	8+1	2	0+0	0	0+0	0	1+4	0
28	FW	(Republic of Ireland) IRL	Anthony Stokes	24	8	12+1	4	4+0	0	1+0	0	6+0	4
29	FW	(England) ENG	Chris Dagnall	15	0	3+8	0	0+0	0	1+0	0	1+2	0
30	MF	(Scotland) SCO	Kevin Thomson	8	0	1+3	0	0+0	0	1+0	0	2+1	0
32	GK	(Finland) FIN	Otso Virtanen	1	0	0+0	0	0+0	0	0+0	0	0+1	0
33	MF	(Scotland) SCO	Alex Harris	1	0	0+0	0	0+0	0	1+0	0	0+0	0
35	FW	(Australia) AUS	Jason Cummings	48	25	30+2	18	4+1	1	6+0	4	5+0	2
44	MF	(Scotland) SCO	Jordan Sinclair	1	0	0+0	0	0+0	0	0+1	0	0+0	0
48	MF	(Scotland) SCO	Scott Martin	4	1	1+1	0	1+0	0	1+0	1	0+0	0
49	FW	(Scotland) SCO	Lewis Allan	1	0	0+0	0	0+1	0	0+0	0	0+0	0
51	FW	(Scotland) SCO	Oliver Shaw	1	0	0+0	0	0+0	0	0+1	0	0+0	0

a. Includes other competitive competitions, including the play-offs and the Challenge Cup.

=== Disciplinary record ===
As of 21 May 2016 (UTC)

Number	Nation	Position	Name	Championship		Other		League Cup		Scottish Cup		Total	
Number	Nation	Position	Name	Booked	Sent off (straight red)	Booked	Sent off (straight red)	Booked	Sent off (straight red)	Booked	Sent off (straight red)	Booked	Sent off (straight red)
1	(England)	GK	Mark Oxley	0	0	0	0	1	0	2	0	3	0
2	(Scotland)	DF	David Gray	4	0	0	0	1	0	1	0	6	0
3	(Scotland)	MF	Liam Henderson	8	0	0	0	1	0	0	0	9	0
4	(Scotland)	DF	Paul Hanlon	1	0	0	0	1	0	2	0	4	0
5	(England)	DF	Liam Fontaine	3	0	0	0	0	0	0	0	3	0
6	(England)	DF	Marvin Bartley	6	0	1	0	2	0	2	0	11	0
7	(Republic of the Congo)	FW	Dominique Malonga	2	0	0	0	1	0	0	0	3	0
8	(Scotland)	MF	Fraser Fyvie	5	0	1	0	1	0	1	0	8	0
10	(Scotland)	MF	Scott Allan	1	0	1	0	0	0	0	0	2	0
10	(Scotland)	MF	Dylan McGeouch	0	0	1	0	0	0	0	0	1	0
16	(Scotland)	DF	Lewis Stevenson	7	0	0	0	0	0	0	0	7	0
17	(Scotland)	FW	Martin Boyle	2	0	0	0	0	0	0	0	2	0
18	(Scotland)	MF	John McGinn	4	0	1	0	1	0	0	0	6	0
19	(Scotland)	FW	James Keatings	0	0	0	0	0	0	2	0	2	0
24	(Scotland)	DF	Darren McGregor	2	0	1	0	0	0	1	0	4	0
28	(Republic of Ireland)	FW	Anthony Stokes	2	0	2	0	0	0	1	0	5	0
29	(England)	FW	Chris Dagnall	2	0	0	0	0	0	0	0	2	0
30	(Scotland)	MF	Kevin Thomson	0	0	0	0	0	0	1	0	1	0
35	(Scotland)	FW	Jason Cummings	4	0	0	0	0	0	2	1	6	1
Total				56	0	5	0	9	0	9	0	85	1

== Club statistics ==
=== League table ===
Pos	Team	Pld	W	D	L	GF	GA	GD	Pts	Promotion, qualification or relegation
1	Rangers (C, P)	36	25	6	5	88	34	+54	81	Promotion to the Premiership
2	Falkirk	36	19	13	4	61	34	+27	70	Qualification for the Premiership play-off semi-finals
3	Hibernian	36	21	7	8	59	34	+25	70	Qualification for the Europa League second qualifying round and for the Premiership play-off quarter-finals (Note: Hibernian qualified for the Europa League second qualifying round by winning the 2015–16 Scottish Cup.)
4	Raith Rovers	36	18	8	10	52	46	+6	62	Qualification for the Premiership play-off quarter-finals
5	Greenock Morton	36	11	10	15	39	42	−3	43	

Source: Soccerway
Rules for classification: 1) Points; 2) Goal difference; 3) Number of goals scored
(C) Champions; (P) Promoted

=== Division summary ===
Round	1	2	3	4	5	6	7	8	9	10	11	12	13	14	15	16	17	18	19	20	21	22	23	24	25	26	27	28	29	30	31	32	33	34	35
Ground	A	H	A	H	H	A	H	A	H	A	A	H	A	H	H	H	H	A	H	A	H	A	A	H	H	A	A	A	A	A	H	H	A	H	H
Result	L	W	L	W	W	W	D	W	W	W	W	W	W	W	W	D	W	L	W	D	W	W	D	W	L	L	L	L	D	L	D	W	D	W	W
Position	7	6	6	5	3	3	4	3	3	2	2	2	2	2	2	2	2	2	3	3	2	2	2	2	2	2	2	3	3	3	3	3	3	3	3

Updated to match(es) played on 21 May 2016. Source:
A = Away; H = Home; W = Win; D = Draw; L = Loss

=== Management statistics ===
Name	From	To	P	W	D	L	Win% (Note: Win% is the percentage of matches won rounded to two decimal places.)
Alan Stubbs	25 July 2015	21 May 2016	53	31	10	12	58.49

== Transfers ==
=== Players in ===
Player	From	Fee
(Scotland) James Keatings	(Scotland) Heart of Midlothian	Free
(Scotland) Dan Carmichael	(Scotland) Queen of the South	Free
(Scotland) Martin Boyle	(Scotland) Dundee	Free
(England) Mark Oxley	(England) Hull City	Free
(Spain) Antonio Reguero	(Scotland) Ross County	Free
(England) Marvin Bartley	(England) Leyton Orient	Free
(Scotland) John McGinn	(Scotland) St Mirren	Undisclosed
(Scotland) Dylan McGeouch	(Scotland) Celtic	Undisclosed
(Scotland) Darren McGregor	(Scotland) Rangers	Free
(England) Jamie Insall	(England) Stourbridge	Undisclosed
(England) Adam Eckersley	(Scotland) Heart of Midlothian	Free
(England) Chris Dagnall	(India) Kerala Blasters	Free
(Scotland) Kevin Thomson	(Scotland) Dundee	Free
(Finland) Otso Virtanen	(Finland) IFK Mariehamn	Free
(Republic of Ireland) Conrad Logan	Free agent	Free

=== Players out ===
Player	To	Fee
(Scotland) Liam Craig	(Scotland) St Johnstone	Free
(Ivory Coast) Franck Dja Djedje	(Qatar) Al-Shahania	Free
(Scotland) Scott Robertson	(Romania) Botosani	Free
(Czech Republic) Tomáš Černý	(Scotland) Partick Thistle	Free
(Scotland) Callum Booth	(Scotland) Partick Thistle	Free
(Scotland) Scott Allan	(Scotland) Celtic	Undisclosed
(Republic of the Congo) Dominique Malonga	(Italy) Pro Vercelli	Undisclosed
(Scotland) Conner Duthie	(Scotland) Dunfermline Athletic	Free
(England) Adam Eckersley	(Canada) Edmonton	Free
(Spain) Antonio Reguero		Free

=== Loans in ===
Player	From
(Scotland) Liam Henderson	(Scotland) Celtic
(Scotland) Islam Feruz	(England) Chelsea
(Estonia) Henri Anier	(Scotland) Dundee United
(Norway) Niklas Gunnarsson	(Norway) Vålerenga
(Republic of Ireland) Anthony Stokes	(Scotland) Celtic

=== Loans out ===
Player	To
(Scotland) Alex Harris	(Scotland) Queen of the South
(Scotland) Lewis Allan	(Scotland) Forfar Athletic
(Scotland) Conner Duthie	(Scotland) Spartans
(Scotland) Scott Martin	(Scotland) Forfar Athletic
(Scotland) Callum Crane	(Scotland) Berwick Rangers
(England) Jamie Insall	(Scotland) East Fife
(Scotland) Jordon Forster	(England) Plymouth Argyle

== See also ==
- List of Hibernian F.C. seasons
