= 2016 Scottish League Cup final =

There were two Scottish League Cup finals played in 2016:

- 2016 Scottish League Cup final (March), final of the 2015–16 Scottish League Cup, Ross County 2–1 Hibernian
- 2016 Scottish League Cup final (November), final of the 2016–17 Scottish League Cup, Celtic 3–0 Aberdeen
