= Otso Virtanen =

Finnish footballer (born 1994)

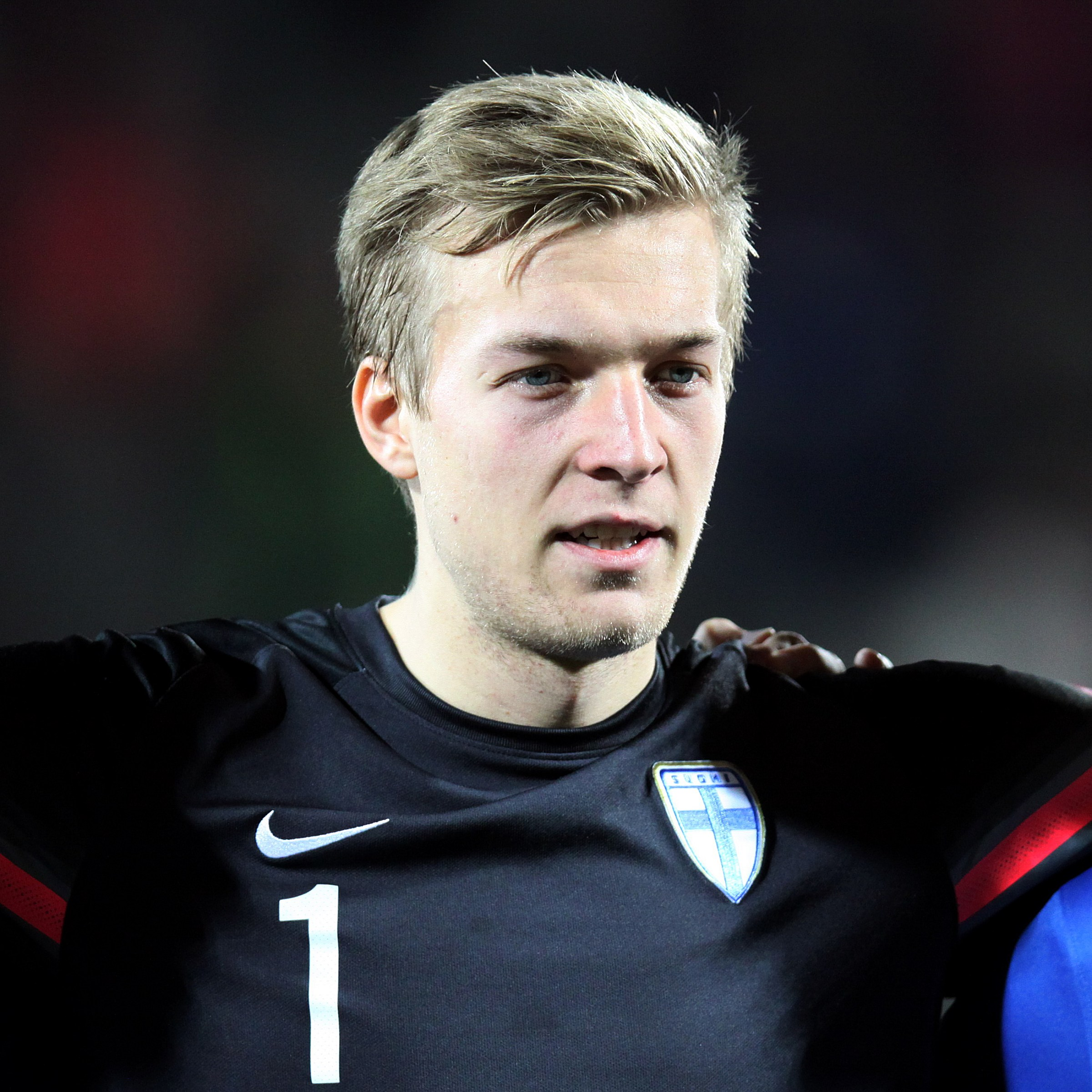
- Virtanen playing for Finland U-21s in November 2015

Personal information
- Date of birth: 3 April 1994 (age 32)
- Place of birth: Turku, Finland
- Height: 1.95 m (6 ft 5 in)
- Position: Goalkeeper

Team information
- Current team: Gnistan (on loan from Ilves)
- Number: 1

Senior career*
Years	Team	Apps	(Gls)
2011–2012	ÅIFK	20	(0)
2011–2012	TPS	1	(0)
2013–2016	IFK Mariehamn	65	(0)
2016–2017	Hibernian	0	(0)
2017–2022	KuPS	115	(0)
2023–	Ilves	75	(0)
2026–	→ Gnistan (loan)	11	(0)

International career^{‡}
2014–2016	Finland U21	13	(0)
- * Club domestic league appearances and goals as of 13 November 2026 ‡ National team caps and goals as of 5 April 2016

Otso Virtanen (born 3 April 1994) is a Finnish footballer who plays as a goalkeeper for Gnistan, on loan from Ilves.

== Club career ==
Virtanen started his professional career in 2011 at TPS, appearing primarily for their reserve team ÅIFK. Before the 2013 season, he moved to IFK Mariehamn and appeared in 22 matches. In 2014, he served primarily as the backup for Swedish goalkeeper Simon Nurme.

Virtanen signed a three-and-a-half-year contract with Scottish club Hibernian on 24 January 2016. Virtanen was an unused substitute as Hibs lost the 2015–16 Scottish League Cup final to Ross County. He made his first appearance for Hibs in a 2015–16 Scottish Cup tie against Inverness, coming on as a substitute after regular goalkeeper Mark Oxley lost a contact lens. Oxley was shown a yellow card by the referee during this incident, which caused him to be suspended for the Scottish Cup semi-final. Hibs manager Alan Stubbs then signed Conrad Logan as an alternative goalkeeper, and chose to play Logan in the semi-final ahead of Virtanen.

Virtanen made one starting appearance for Hibs, playing in a 2016–17 UEFA Europa League qualifying first leg match against Brondby. He was at fault for the Brondby goal in that match and was replaced for the second leg by Ross Laidlaw. Virtanen left Hibs in January 2017 and signed for Finnish club KuPS.

On 22 May 2024, Virtanen signed a contract extension with Ilves, on a deal until the end of 2026. He had gained a team captaincy in his first season with the club in 2023.

== International career ==
In May 2014, Virtanen was selected for the Finland national under-21 team for the match against Moldova.

== Career statistics ==
As of 11 March 2025

Appearances and goals by club, season and competition
Club	Season	League			Cup (Note: Includes Suomen Cup and Scottish Cup)		League cup (Note: Includes Finnish League Cup)		Continental		Total	
Club	Season	Division	Apps	Goals	Apps	Goals	Apps	Goals	Apps	Goals	Apps	Goals
ÅIFK	2011	Kakkonen	2	0	–		–		–		2	0
ÅIFK	2012	Kakkonen	18	0	–		–		–		18	0
ÅIFK	Total		20	0	–	–	–	–	–	–	20	0
TPS	2011	Veikkausliiga	1	0	0	0	0	0	–		1	0
TPS	2012	Veikkausliiga	0	0	0	0	0	0	–		0	0
TPS	Total		1	0	0	0	0	0	–	–	1	0
IFK Mariehamn	2013	Veikkausliiga	22	0	2	0	6	0	–		30	0
IFK Mariehamn	2014	Veikkausliiga	17	0	3	0	4	0	–		24	0
IFK Mariehamn	2015	Veikkausliiga	26	0	1	0	2	0	–		29	0
IFK Mariehamn	Total		65	0	6	0	12	0	–	–	83	0
Hibernian	2015–16	Scottish Championship	0	0	1	0	0	0	–		1	0
Hibernian	2016–17	Scottish Championship	0	0	0	0	0	0	1 (Note: Includes UEFA Europa League)	0	1	0
Hibernian	Total		0	0	1	0	0	0	1	0	2	0
KuPS	2017	Veikkausliiga	33	0	6	0	–		–		39	0
KuPS	2018	Veikkausliiga	25	0	4	0	–		2	0	31	0
KuPS	2019	Veikkausliiga	25	0	4	0	–		4	0	33	0
KuPS	2020	Veikkausliiga	22	0	6	0	–		4 (Note: Includes UEFA Champions League and UEFA Europa League)	0	32	0
KuPS	2021	Veikkausliiga	5	0	5	0	–		0	0	10	0
KuPS	2022	Veikkausliiga	5	0	4	0	0	0	0	0	9	0
KuPS	Total		115	0	29	0	0	0	10	0	154	0
KuPS II	2022	Kakkonen	2	0	–		–		–		2	0
Ilves	2023	Veikkausliiga	25	0	6	0	5	0	–		36	0
Ilves	2024	Veikkausliiga	24	0	1	0	6	0	3 (Note: Appearances in UEFA Conference League)	0	34	0
Ilves	2025	Veikkausliiga	0	0	0	0	5	0	0	0	5	0
Ilves	Total		49	0	7	0	16	0	3	0	75	0
Career total			252	0	43	0	28	0	14	0	337	0

== Honours ==
Hibernian

- Scottish Cup: 2015–16
- Scottish League Cup runners-up: 2015–16

Kuopion Palloseura

- Veikkausliiga: 2019
- Suomen Cup: 2021, 2022

Ilves

- Veikkausliiga runner-up: 2024
- Suomen Cup: 2023

IFK Mariehamn

- Suomen Cup: 2015
