= 2016 Scottish League Cup final (March) =

- Event: 2015–16 Scottish League Cup
Hibernian	Ross County
1	2
- Date: 13 March 2016
- Venue: Hampden Park, Glasgow
- Man of the Match: Jackson Irvine
- Referee: Kevin Clancy
- Attendance: 38,796
- Weather: Dry

The 2015–16 Scottish League Cup final was the 70th final of the Scottish League Cup. The final took place on 13 March 2016 at Hampden Park, Glasgow. The clubs contesting the final were Hibernian and Ross County, with Ross County winning 2–1 with a last minute goal. The win was Ross County's first major trophy in senior football.

This final is the most recent to be played in March, as from the 2016–17 season the Scottish League Cup reverted to being played during the first part of the season.

== Route to the final ==
Hibernian entered the League Cup in the first round, whilst Ross County entered in the second round.

=== Hibernian ===
Round	Opposition	Score
First round	Montrose	3–0 (h)
Second round	Stranraer	1–0 (h)
Third round	Aberdeen	2–0 (h)
Quarter-final	Dundee United	3–0 (h)
Semi-final	St Johnstone	2–1 (n)

In the first round Hibernian faced a home tie against Scottish League Two side Montrose. Hibs progressed with goals from Scott Martin, Scott Allan and Jason Cummings.

Hibernian drew Scottish League One opposition in the second round in the shape of Stranraer. An own goal from Scott Rumsby saw Hibernian take their place in the third round.

In the third round Hibernian faced Scottish Premiership side Aberdeen. Late goals from Jason Cummings and Dominique Malonga sealed their passage into the quarter-finals.

Hibernian faced Dundee United in the quarter-finals. Goals from David Gray, Jason Cummings and Lewis Stevenson saw the Edinburgh side claim their place in the semi-finals.

Hibernian beat St Johnstone in the semi-final with goals from Jason Cummings and John McGinn. This sent Alan Stubbs' side to their first League Cup final since 2007.

=== Ross County ===
Round	Opposition	Score
Second round	Ayr United	2–0 (h)
Third round	Falkirk	7–0 (h)
Quarter-final	Inverness CT	2–1 (a)
Semi-final	Celtic	3–1 (n)

Ross County drew Scottish League One side Ayr United in the second round of the League Cup. Goals from Liam Boyce in the first half and Michael Gardyne in the second were enough to send the Staggies through to the next round.

In the third round Ross County faced Scottish Championship side Falkirk in Dingwall. An emphatic 7–0 victory, which included goals from Raffaele De Vita, Jonathan Franks, Brian Graham, Darren Holden and a Liam Boyce hat-trick, saw Ross County ease into the quarter-finals.

Ross County were the victors against their Highland neighbours Inverness Caledonian Thistle. Goals from Irvine and Gardyne were enough to see County into their first ever League Cup semi-final.

Ross County beat favourites Celtic 3–1, in a match which saw the Bhoys miss a penalty and reduced to 10 players. Goals from Martin Woods, Paul Quinn and Alex Schalk were enough to cancel out Gary Mackay-Steven's first-minute opener and see Ross County into their first ever League Cup final.

== Match ==
=== Details ===
13 March 2016
15:00

Hibernian	1–2	Ross County
Fontaine 45'	BBC Sport Report	Gardyne 25'; Schalk 90'

Hampden Park, Glasgow
Attendance: 38,796
Referee: Kevin Clancy

Hibernian	Ross County

HIBERNIAN:
GK	1	(England) Mark Oxley
RB	2	(Scotland) David Gray (c)
CB	24	(Scotland) Darren McGregor
CB	5	(England) Liam Fontaine
LB	16	(Scotland) Lewis Stevenson
RM	3	(Scotland) Liam Henderson
CM	30	(Scotland) Kevin Thomson	(substituted off) 76'
CM	6	(England) Marvin Bartley	(substituted off) 90+4'
LM	18	(Scotland) John McGinn
CF	28	(Republic of Ireland) Anthony Stokes
CF	35	(Australia) Jason Cummings
Substitutes:
GK	32	(Finland) Otso Virtanen
FW	9	(Morocco) Farid El Alagui
MF	14	(Scotland) Danny Handling
MF	17	(Scotland) Martin Boyle	(substituted on) 90+4'
FW	19	(Scotland) James Keatings	(substituted on) 76'
DF	27	(Norway) Niklas Gunnarsson
FW	29	(England) Chris Dagnall
Manager:
(England) Alan Stubbs

ROSS COUNTY:
GK	21	(England) Gary Woods
RB	2	(Scotland) Marcus Fraser
CB	43	(Scotland) Paul Quinn
CB	15	(England) Andrew Davies (c)
LB	12	(Scotland) Richard Foster	(substituted off) 85'
RM	7	(Scotland) Michael Gardyne
CM	36	(Australia) Jackson Irvine
CM	26	(Scotland) Martin Woods
LM	8	(Scotland) Ian McShane	(substituted off) 79'
CF	10	(Northern Ireland) Liam Boyce	(substituted off) 59'
CF	23	(Netherlands) Alex Schalk
Substitutes:
GK	13	(United States) Chris Konopka
DF	5	(Scotland) Scott Boyd
DF	6	(Scotland) Chris Robertson
MF	17	(England) Jonathan Franks	(substituted on) 85'
MF	18	(Scotland) Stewart Murdoch	(substituted on) 79'
MF	24	(Italy) Raffaele De Vita
FW	9	(Scotland) Brian Graham	(substituted on) 59'
Manager:
(Scotland) Jim McIntyre

MATCH OFFICIALS

- Referee: Kevin Clancy

MATCH RULES

- 90 minutes
- 30 minutes of extra-time if necessary
- Penalty shoot-out if scores still level
- Seven named substitutes
- Maximum of three substitutions
