= Liam Fontaine =

English footballer (born 1986)

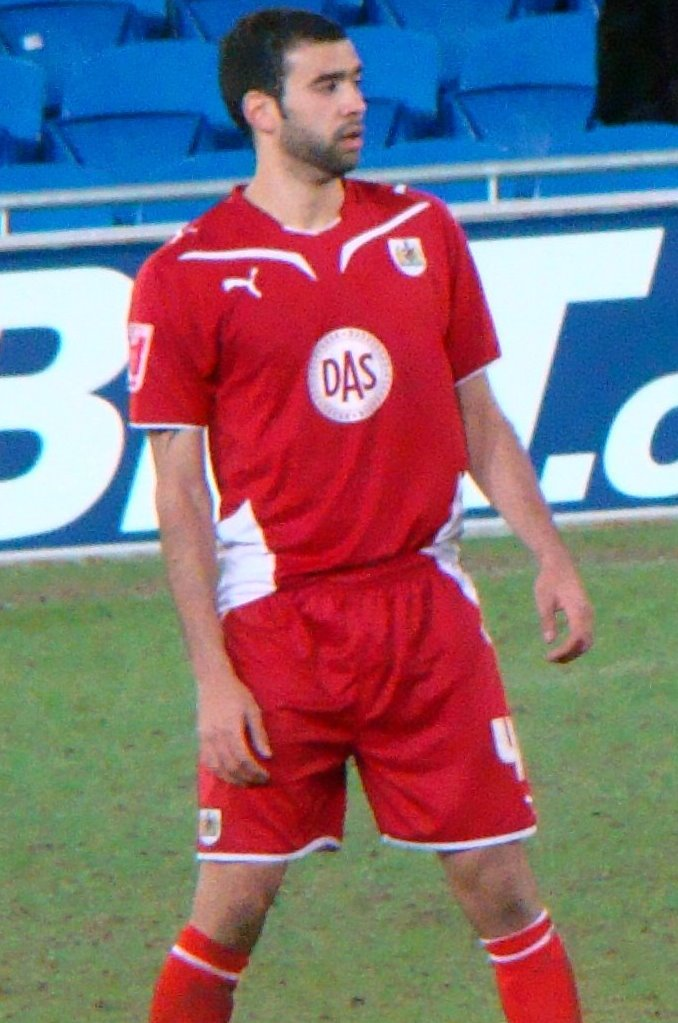
- Fontaine playing for Bristol City

Personal information
- Full name: Liam Vaughan Henry Fontaine
- Date of birth: 7 January 1986 (age 40)
- Place of birth: Beckenham, London, England
- Position: Defender

Senior career*
| Years | Team | Apps | (Gls) |
| 2004–2006 | Fulham | 1 | (0) |
| 2004 | → Yeovil Town (loan) | 15 | (0) |
| 2005 | → Kilmarnock (loan) | 3 | (0) |
| 2005 | → Yeovil Town (loan) | 10 | (0) |
| 2006 | → Bristol City (loan) | 15 | (0) |
| 2006–2014 | Bristol City | 247 | (6) |
| 2013–2014 | → Yeovil Town (loan) | 5 | (0) |
| 2014–2018 | Hibernian | 70 | (2) |
| 2018–2020 | Ross County | 45 | (1) |
| 2020–2022 | Dundee | 37 | (4) |
| 2022–2024 | Edinburgh City | 41 | (1) |
| Total | | 489 | (14) |

International career
| 2001–2002 | England U16 | 7 | (0) |
| 2002 | England U17 | 2 | (0) |
| 2005 | England U20 | 1 | (0) |
- * Club domestic league appearances and goals

Liam Vaughan Henry Fontaine (born 7 January 1986) is an English former professional footballer who played as a defender. He has previously played in the English leagues for Fulham, Yeovil Town and Bristol City, and in the Scottish leagues for Kilmarnock, Hibernian, Ross County, Dundee and Edinburgh City. Fontaine retired in 2024, having compiled a lengthy and successful career of over 550 appearances and honours such as the Scottish Cup with Hibernian.

== Career ==
=== Fulham ===
Fontaine, who was a youth player at Fulham, represented England at under-16 and under-17 level. Fontaine spent some time at Yeovil Town in the first part of the 2004–05 season. His loan move was initially for a single month, but was later extended by a further two months. He made a couple of first team appearances for Fulham in January 2005. His debut came in a Premier League game against Southampton at St. Mary's on 5 January, which was drawn 3–3. He enjoyed a further loan spell in the latter part of the 2004–05 season with Kilmarnock in the Scottish Premier League.

=== Bristol City ===
After being brought to Yeovil by then manager Gary Johnson, Fontaine then went back to Fulham until he was brought to Bristol City on loan by his former Yeovil manager Johnson. The loan spell was made permanent at the end of that season with Fontaine signing a two-year contract, with City having to pay Fulham an undisclosed fee through tribunal. A key member of the 2006–07 promotion team and flourished once more at Championship level, he became centre stage when his goal against Wolves in November left his manager Gary Johnson red-faced – having previously told his defender he would "bare my backside in Burton's window" if he found the net. Fontaine signed a new deal with Bristol City on 12 January 2012 to keep him at the club until the end of 2014 season, stating his ambition is to be the club's captain on a permanent basis.

On 2 September 2013, Fontaine joined Championship side Yeovil Town, for a third spell, on loan until January 2014. At the end of the 2013–14 season, Fontaine was released by Bristol City.

=== Hibernian ===
On 26 August 2014, Fontaine joined Scottish Championship side Hibernian. He made his debut the same day, in Hibernian's 3–2 victory against Dumbarton in the Scottish League Cup. Fontaine made 38 appearances and scored two goals in the 2014–15 season. In June 2015, he signed a two-year contract with Hibernian. He scored a goal in the March 2016 Scottish League Cup Final, which Hibs lost 2–1 to Ross County. Fontaine played the first 70 minutes of the 2016 Scottish Cup Final, which Hibs won 3–2 against Rangers.

In June 2017, Fontaine signed a contract with Hibs for the 2017–18 season. He suffered an ankle injury playing for the Hibs under-20 side in September 2017, which head coach Neil Lennon said would prevent Fontaine from playing for at least 10 weeks.

=== Ross County ===
On 31 January 2018, Fontaine joined Scottish Premiership team Ross County on a free transfer. He made his debut later that day, in a 4–2 defeat against Aberdeen. County were relegated from the Premiership at the end of the 2017–18 season, but Fontaine helped them win promotion from the Scottish Championship in 2018–19. He left County by mutual consent in October 2020.

=== Dundee ===
On 20 November 2020 after a trial period, Fontaine joined Scottish Championship side Dundee until the end of the season. He would make his debut the next day as a substitute against Ayr United. Fontaine had a prolific December, scoring 3 goals in 4 games for the club going into the new year. Fontaine would be a key piece in the Dundee side leading up to and in the Premiership play-offs, and helped the club to gain promotion to the Premiership. On 28 May 2021, Fontaine signed a one-year extension with Dundee. Fontaine would leave Dundee following the end of his contract in May 2022.

=== Edinburgh City ===
Fontaine signed for Scottish League One club Edinburgh in July 2022. After a strong season as team captain, Fontaine would renew his contract for another season in July 2023 for the renamed Edinburgh City. Fontaine departed the club in January 2024, following Edinburgh City being docked points for failing to pay player wages.

On 16 March 2024, Fontaine announced publicly that he was retiring from professional football.

== Personal life ==
During a period out of football due to injury, Fontaine began playing the guitar. In September 2018 he released a single called "Life Lessons".

== Career statistics ==
As of 6 January 2024

Appearances and goals by club, season and competition
| Club | Season | League | | | National Cup | | League Cup | | Other | | Total | |
| Club | Season | Division | Apps | Goals | Apps | Goals | Apps | Goals | Apps | Goals | Apps | Goals |
|---|---|---|---|---|---|---|---|---|---|---|---|---|
| Fulham | 2004–05 | Premier League | 1 | 0 | 1 | 0 | 0 | 0 | — | | 2 | 0 |
| Fulham | 2005–06 | Premier League | 0 | 0 | 0 | 0 | 0 | 0 | — | | 0 | 0 |
| Fulham | Total | | 1 | 0 | 1 | 0 | 0 | 0 | — | | 2 | 0 |
| Yeovil Town (loan) | 2004–05 | League Two | 15 | 0 | — | | 2 | 0 | 1 (Note: Appearance(s) in Football League Trophy) | 0 | 18 | 0 |
| Kilmarnock (loan) | 2004–05 | Scottish Premier League | 3 | 0 | 2 | 0 | 0 | 0 | — | | 5 | 0 |
| Yeovil Town (loan) | 2005–06 | League One | 10 | 0 | 1 | 0 | 1 | 0 | 0 | 0 | 12 | 0 |
| Bristol City (loan) | 2005–06 | League One | 15 | 0 | — | | — | | 0 | 0 | 15 | 0 |
| Bristol City | 2006–07 | League One | 30 | 0 | 4 | 0 | 1 | 0 | 5 | 0 | 40 | 0 |
| Bristol City | 2007–08 | Championship | 38 | 1 | 1 | 1 | 2 | 0 | 3 (Note: Appearances in Championship play-offs) | 0 | 44 | 2 |
| Bristol City | 2008–09 | Championship | 42 | 2 | 2 | 0 | 2 | 0 | — | | 46 | 2 |
| Bristol City | 2009–10 | Championship | 36 | 2 | 2 | 0 | 2 | 0 | — | | 40 | 2 |
| Bristol City | 2010–11 | Championship | 31 | 0 | 1 | 0 | 1 | 0 | — | | 33 | 0 |
| Bristol City | 2011–12 | Championship | 26 | 0 | 0 | 0 | 0 | 0 | — | | 26 | 0 |
| Bristol City | 2012–13 | Championship | 41 | 1 | 1 | 0 | 1 | 0 | — | | 43 | 1 |
| Bristol City | 2013–14 | League One | 3 | 0 | 2 | 0 | 2 | 0 | 0 | 0 | 7 | 0 |
| Bristol City | Total | | 262 | 6 | 13 | 1 | 11 | 0 | 8 | 0 | 294 | 7 |
| Yeovil Town (loan) | 2013–14 | Championship | 5 | 0 | — | | — | | — | | 5 | 0 |
| Hibernian | 2014–15 | Scottish Championship | 29 | 1 | 4 | 1 | 3 | 0 | 2 (Note: Appearances in Scottish Premiership play-offs) | 0 | 38 | 2 |
| Hibernian | 2015–16 | Scottish Championship | 26 | 1 | 4 | 0 | 6 | 1 | 3 (Note: Two appearances in Scottish Premiership play-offs, one in Scottish Challenge Cup) | 0 | 39 | 2 |
| Hibernian | 2016–17 (Note: Soccerbase did not record two appearances made by Fontaine against Brondby IF on 14 July and 21 July 2016.) | Scottish Championship | 15 | 0 | 3 | 0 | 1 | 0 | 2 (Note: Appearances in UEFA Europa League) | 0 | 21 | 0 |
| Hibernian | 2017–18 | Scottish Premiership | 0 | 0 | 0 | 0 | 2 | 0 | — | | 2 | 0 |
| Hibernian | Total | | 70 | 2 | 11 | 1 | 12 | 1 | 7 | 0 | 100 | 4 |
| Ross County | 2017–18 | Scottish Premiership | 14 | 0 | 0 | 0 | — | | — | | 14 | 0 |
| Ross County | 2018–19 | Scottish Championship | 9 | 0 | 0 | 0 | 2 | 0 | 2 (Note: Appearances in Scottish Challenge Cup) | 0 | 13 | 0 |
| Ross County | 2019–20 | Scottish Premiership | 22 | 1 | 1 | 0 | 4 | 0 | — | | 27 | 1 |
| Ross County | 2020–21 | Scottish Premiership | 0 | 0 | 0 | 0 | 0 | 0 | — | | 0 | 0 |
| Ross County | Total | | 45 | 1 | 1 | 0 | 6 | 0 | 2 | 0 | 54 | 1 |
| Dundee | 2020–21 | Scottish Championship | 18 | 4 | 2 | 0 | 1 | 0 | 3 (Note: Appearances in Scottish Premiership play-offs) | 0 | 24 | 4 |
| Dundee | 2021–22 | Scottish Premiership | 19 | 0 | 0 | 0 | 5 | 0 | — | | 24 | 0 |
| Dundee | Total | | 37 | 4 | 2 | 0 | 6 | 0 | 3 | 0 | 48 | 4 |
| Edinburgh City | 2022–23 | Scottish League One | 28 | 1 | 1 | 0 | 4 | 0 | 1 (Note: Appearance in Scottish Challenge Cup) | 0 | 34 | 1 |
| Edinburgh City | 2023–24 | Scottish League One | 13 | 0 | 1 | 0 | 2 | 0 | 0 | 0 | 16 | 0 |
| Edinburgh City | Total | | 41 | 1 | 2 | 0 | 6 | 0 | 1 | 0 | 50 | 1 |
| Career total | | | 489 | 14 | 33 | 2 | 44 | 1 | 22 | 0 | 588 | 17 |

== Honours ==
Yeovil Town

- Football League Two: 2004–05

Hibernian

- Scottish Championship: 2016–17
- Scottish Cup: 2015–16
- Scottish League Cup runner-up: 2015–16

Ross County

- Scottish Championship: 2018–19
- Scottish Challenge Cup: 2018–19
