= Dylan McGeouch =

Scottish footballer (born 1993)

Personal information
- Full name: Dylan McGeouch
- Date of birth: 15 January 1993 (age 33)
- Place of birth: Glasgow, Scotland
- Height: 1.73 m (5 ft 8 in)
- Position: Midfielder

Team information
- Current team: Ballymena United
- Number: 21

Youth career
- 2005–2008: Celtic
- 2008–2011: Rangers

Senior career*
Years	Team	Apps	(Gls)
2011–2015	Celtic	20	(2)
2014	→ Coventry City (loan)	8	(0)
2014–2015	→ Hibernian (loan)	20	(2)
2015–2018	Hibernian	72	(0)
2018–2020	Sunderland	30	(0)
2020–2022	Aberdeen	36	(0)
2022–2023	Forest Green Rovers	24	(0)
2023–2025	Carlisle United	20	(0)
2025-2026	Ballymena United	17	(0)

International career^{‡}
2008–2009	Scotland U16	6	(0)
2009–2010	Scotland U17	8	(1)
2010–2011	Scotland U19	5	(1)
2012–2013	Scotland U21	10	(0)
2018	Scotland	2	(0)
- * Club domestic league appearances and goals as of 29 April 2026 ‡ National team caps and goals as of 20:56, 5 August 2023 (UTC)

Dylan McGeouch (born 15 January 1993) is a Scottish professional footballer, who plays as a midfielder for NIFL Premiership club Ballymena. He has previously played for Celtic, Coventry City, Hibernian, Sunderland, Aberdeen, Forest Green Rovers and Carlisle United. At international level, he made two appearances for Scotland in 2018.

== Club career ==
=== Celtic ===
McGeouch grew up in the Milton area of Glasgow, supporting Celtic. McGeouch started his career with the Celtic youth system, frequently playing alongside Callum McGregor who was also a teammate in youth Victory Shield internationals at Under-16 level; at that time McGeouch was a pupil at Bishopbriggs Academy. He was often a ball boy for first team matches during his time there. He left Celtic in 2008 after his older brother Darren, who was also playing for the club's youth teams, fell out of favour.

McGeouch went to Rangers in 2008, but he returned to Celtic in 2011 after Neil Lennon visited his house and asked him to come back. Rangers manager Walter Smith had appealed to McGeouch to stay at Rangers. Rangers were later awarded £100,000 by a transfer tribunal regarding the McGeouch transfer.

McGeouch made his Celtic debut on 6 November 2011, when he came on as a late substitute in a 2–1 win over Motherwell. On 26 November, he made his second appearance for Celtic, coming on as a 64th-minute substitute against St Mirren. Eight minutes later he scored his first goal for the club after collecting the ball deep inside his own half and running 70 yards, dribbling past several St Mirren players, before striking a low left foot shot into the net to seal a 5–0 victory.

On 30 January 2014, McGeouch was loaned to Coventry City for the remainder of the 2013–14 season. He returned to Celtic in the summer of 2014.

=== Hibernian ===
After making one appearance for Celtic in August 2014, he was loaned to Hibernian until the end of the season. He made his first appearance against Cowdenbeath on 13 September. He received a red card in the League Cup fixture against Ross County for a heavy tackle on Joe Cardle. He scored his first goal for Hibernian in a 4–0 victory over Livingston at Almondvale Stadium.

On 21 August 2015, McGeouch signed permanently for Hibernian on a three-year deal. He suffered a series of injury problems during the 2015–16 season and was restricted to 19 league appearances. McGeouch came back into the team for the promotion playoffs, in which Hibs lost 5–4 on aggregate to Falkirk. He then played the full game as Hibs defeated Rangers in the 2016 Scottish Cup final, their first victory in the competition for 114 years.

McGeouch was restricted to 18 league appearances in 2016–17, as Hibs won promotion to the Scottish Premiership. He scored one goal during the season, the second Hibs goal in the 2016–17 Scottish Cup semi-final defeat by Aberdeen.

McGeouch produced impressive performances during the 2017–18 season, as he was able to stay relatively free of injury problems. He earned a selection for the international squad in March 2018, but then had to withdraw due to an abductor injury. With his contract due to expire at the end of the season, head coach Neil Lennon confirmed during May 2018 that McGeouch would leave under freedom of contract.

=== Later career ===
McGeouch signed for EFL League One club Sunderland in July 2018.

On 7 January 2020, McGeouch signed for Scottish Premiership club Aberdeen on a permanent deal until 2022. In August 2020 he was one of eight Aberdeen players who received a suspended three-match ban from the Scottish Football Association after they breached coronavirus-related restrictions by visiting a bar earlier in the month.

In October 2022, McGeouch had an unsuccessful trial with Scottish side Livingston before joining EFL League One club Forest Green Rovers on a deal until the end of the 2022–23 season. He became club captain and won the Player of the Year award but chose to leave following the club's relegation to League Two.

On 7 July 2023, McGeouch joined Carlisle United on a two-year deal. On 16 May 2025, Carlisle announced he would be leaving in June when his contract expired..

On 12 November 2025, McGeouch joined NIFL Premiership club Ballymena on a short-term deal.

== International career ==
McGeouch was called up to the Scotland under-21 squad on 17 April 2012, to face Italy eight days later.

He was selected for the full Scotland squad in March 2018, but he had to withdraw due to injury. He was again selected for the squad in May 2018, for friendly matches in Peru and Mexico. McGeouch made his full Scotland debut on 29 May 2018, in a 2–0 defeat to Peru.

== Style of play ==
McGeouch's primary position was as an attacking midfielder but used to also play on the wings.

== Career statistics ==
As of match played 5 September 2023

Appearances and goals by club, season and competition
Club	Season	League			National cup		League cup		Other		Total	
Club	Season	Division	Apps	Goals	Apps	Goals	Apps	Goals	Apps	Goals	Apps	Goals
Celtic	2011–12	Scottish Premier League	6	1	2	0	0	0	0	0	8	1
Celtic	2012–13	Scottish Premier League	12	1	2	0	1	0	0	0	15	1
Celtic	2013–14	Scottish Premiership	1	0	0	0	1	0	1 (Note: Appearance in the UEFA Champions League)	0	3	0
Celtic	2014–15	Scottish Premiership	1	0	0	0	0	0	0	0	1	0
Celtic	Total		20	2	4	0	2	0	1	0	27	2
Coventry City (loan)	2013–14	League One	8	0	0	0	0	0	0	0	8	0
Hibernian (loan)	2014–15	Scottish Championship	20	2	3	1	1	0	2 (Note: Appearances in the Scottish Premiership play-offs)	0	26	3
Hibernian	2015–16	Scottish Championship	19	0	4	0	3	0	4	0	30	0
Hibernian	2016–17	Scottish Championship	18	0	1	1	0	0	4 (Note: Two appearances in the Scottish Challenge Cup and two appearances in the UEFA Europa League)	0	23	1
Hibernian	2017–18	Scottish Premiership	35	0	1	0	6	0	—		42	0
Hibernian	Total		72	0	6	1	9	0	8	0	95	1
Sunderland	2018–19	League One	22	0	2	0	0	0	6 (Note: Appearances in the EFL Trophy)	0	30	0
Sunderland	2019–20	League One	8	0	0	0	2	0	1	0	11	0
Sunderland	Total		30	0	2	0	2	0	7	0	41	0
Aberdeen	2019–20	Scottish Premiership	7	0	2	0	0	0	0	0	9	0
Aberdeen	2020–21	Scottish Premiership	15	0	1	0	0	0	3 (Note: Appearances in the UEFA Europa League)	0	19	0
Aberdeen	2021–22	Scottish Premiership	14	0	0	0	1	0	2 (Note: Appearances in the UEFA Europa Conference League)	0	17	0
Aberdeen	Total		36	0	3	0	1	0	5	0	45	0
Forest Green Rovers	2022–23	League One	24	0	1	0	0	0	1	0	26	0
Carlisle United	2023–24	League One	14	0	1	0	1	0	2	0	18	0
Carlisle United	2024–25	League Two	6	0	0	0	0	0	1	0	7	0
Career total			201	4	19	2	16	0	25	0	271	6

== Honours ==
Celtic

- Scottish Premier League: 2011–12, 2012–13

Hibernian

- Scottish Cup: 2015–16
- Scottish Championship: 2016–17

Sunderland

- EFL Trophy runner-up: 2018–19

Individual

- Celtic Goal of the Season: 2011–12
- Hibernian Player of the Year: 2018
- Hibernian Players' Player of the Year: 2018
- Forest Green Rovers Supporters' Player of the Season: 2022–23
