= 2015–16 Scottish League Cup =

Tournament details
- Country: Scotland
- Dates: 30 July 2015 – 13 March 2016
- Teams: 42

Final positions
- Champions: Ross County
- Runners-up: Hibernian

Tournament statistics
- Matches played: 41
- Goals scored: 141 (3.44 per match)
- Top goal scorer(s): Liam Boyce; Faissal El Bakhtaoui; Jason Cummings (4 goals each)

The 2015–16 Scottish League Cup was the 70th season of Scotland's second-most prestigious football knockout competition. It is also known as The Scottish League Cup presented by Utilita for sponsorship reasons.

Ross County defeated Hibernian 2–1 in the final on 13 March.

This was Ross County's second major trophy final ever, having previously lost the 2010 Scottish Cup Final, and their first major Scottish honour.

Despite losing this final, Hibs would recover from the blow and end up winning the Scottish Cup two months later, ending a 114-year drought.

This edition of the tournament also marked the first time in the competition's history in which there were six different champions in the most recent six editions, with Celtic, Aberdeen, St. Mirren, Kilmarnock and Rangers having been the five previous champions.

== Format ==
The competition is a single elimination knock-out competition. In each round, fixtures are determined by random draw, with the first to third rounds seeded according to last season's league positions (higher 50% of finishers drawn v lower 50% of finishers, alternating which is at home with each tie drawn).

Fixtures are played to a finish, with extra time and then penalties used in the event of draws. The competition is open to all clubs in the Scottish Professional Football League. Clubs involved in European competitions are given a bye to the third round to avoid congestion of fixtures.

== Qualified teams ==
The following teams qualified and competed in the 2015–16 Scottish League Cup.

=== Scottish Premiership teams ===
There are 12 teams from the 2014–15 Scottish Premiership.

- Aberdeen
- Celtic
- Dundee
- Dundee United
- Hamilton Academical
- Inverness CT
- Kilmarnock
- Motherwell
- Partick Thistle
- Ross County
- St Johnstone
- St Mirren

=== Scottish Championship teams ===
There are 10 teams from the 2014–15 Scottish Championship.

- Alloa Athletic
- Cowdenbeath
- Dumbarton
- Falkirk
- Heart of Midlothian
- Hibernian
- Livingston
- Queen of the South
- Raith Rovers
- Rangers

=== Scottish League One teams ===
There are 10 teams from the 2014–15 Scottish League One.

- Airdrieonians
- Ayr United
- Brechin City
- Dunfermline Athletic
- Forfar Athletic
- Greenock Morton
- Peterhead
- Stenhousemuir
- Stirling Albion
- Stranraer

=== Scottish League Two teams ===
There are 10 teams from the 2014–15 Scottish League Two.

- Albion Rovers
- Annan Athletic
- Arbroath
- Berwick Rangers
- Clyde
- East Fife
- East Stirlingshire
- Elgin City
- Montrose
- Queen's Park

== First round ==
The first round draw took place on Monday 6 July 2015 at 2:30pm BST at the Hampden Park Stadium. The 30 clubs that participated in the Championship, League One and League Two in the 2014–15 season entered the competition at this stage. The 12 clubs that participated in the 2014–15 Scottish Premiership received a bye.

=== Draw and Seeding ===
Pot 1	Pot 2
Scottish Championship: 01. Heart of Midlothian; 02. Hibernian; 03. Rangers; 04. Queen of the South; 05. Falkirk; 06. Raith Rovers; 07. ~~Dumbarton~~; 08. Livingston; 09. ~~Alloa Athletic~~; 10. ~~Cowdenbeath~~; Scottish League One: 11. Greenock Morton; 12. Stranraer; 13. Forfar Athletic; 14. ~~Brechin City~~; 15. Airdrieonians	Scottish League One: 16. ~~Peterhead~~; 17. Dunfermline Athletic; 18. Ayr United; 19. ~~Stenhousemuir~~; 20. ~~Stirling Albion~~; Scottish League Two: 21. ~~Albion Rovers~~; 22. ~~Queen's Park~~; 23. ~~Arbroath~~; 24. East Fife; 25. ~~Annan Athletic~~; 26. ~~Clyde~~; 27. ~~Elgin City~~; 28. Berwick Rangers; 29. ~~East Stirlingshire~~; 30. ~~Montrose~~

=== Matches ===
30 July 2015	Heart of Midlothian	4–2	Arbroath	Edinburgh
19:45	McGhee 57'; Sow 60', 61' (pen.); Wilson 90' (o.g.)	BBC Sport Report	Gold 40'; Grehan 85'	Stadium: Tynecastle Stadium; Attendance: 6,240; Referee: Alan Muir

31 July 2015	Falkirk	5–0	East Stirlingshire	Cumbernauld
19:45	Muirhead 17'; Baird 57'; Vidler 68' (o.g.); McHugh 70'; Alston 78'	BBC Sport Report		Stadium: Broadwood Stadium; Attendance: 881; Referee: Salmond

1 August 2015	Berwick Rangers	3–2 (a.e.t.)	Alloa Athletic	Berwick-upon-Tweed
15:00	Lavery 56'; Morris 77'; Banjo 97'	BBC Sport Report	Flannigan 6', 21'	Stadium: Shielfield Park; Attendance: 405; Referee: Charleston

1 August 2015	Stirling Albion	0–1	Airdrieonians	Stirling
15:00		BBC Sport Report	Morton 41'	Stadium: Forthbank Stadium; Attendance: 799; Referee: Roncone

1 August 2015	Raith Rovers	3–0	Albion Rovers	Kirkcaldy
15:00	Vaughan 16' (pen.); Benedictus 38'; McKeown 54'	BBC Sport Report		Stadium: Stark's Park; Attendance: 1,163; Referee: Walsh

1 August 2015	Annan Athletic	3–4 (a.e.t.)	Queen of the South	Annan
15:00	Osadolor 59'; Weatherson 63', 72'; Black (yellow card) 93' (yellow-red card); Omar (red card) 118'	BBC Sport Report	Conroy 42'; Lyle 65', 100'; Hilson 90'	Stadium: Galabank; Attendance: 1,359; Referee: Graham

1 August 2015	Livingston	1–0 (a.e.t.)	Clyde	Livingston
15:00	White 110'	BBC Sport Report		Stadium: Almondvale Stadium; Attendance: 664; Referee: John McKendrick

1 August 2015	Dunfermline Athletic	5–1	Cowdenbeath	Dunfermline
15:00	El Bakhtaoui 49', 90'; Byrne 56', 78'; Wallace 74' (pen.)	BBC Sport Report	Hughes 58'; Andrews (red card) 72'	Stadium: East End Park; Attendance: 2,756; Referee: Salmond

1 August 2015	Hibernian	3–0	Montrose	Edinburgh
15:00	Martin 33'; Allan 71'; Cummings 82'	BBC Sport Report		Stadium: Easter Road; Attendance: 5,933; Referee: Beaton

1 August 2015	East Fife	1–1 (a.e.t.) (4–3 p)	Dumbarton	Methil
15:00	Austin 48'	BBC Sport Report	Cawley 65'	Stadium: Bayview Stadium; Attendance: 461; Referee: Kirkland
	Penalties
	Mullen (penalty scored) Naysmith (penalty scored) Walker (penalty missed) Sutherland (penalty missed) Slattery (penalty scored) O'Kane (penalty scored)		Taggart (penalty scored) Gallagher (penalty scored) Graham (penalty scored) Craig (penalty missed) Gibson (penalty scored) Cawley (penalty missed)

1 August 2015	Greenock Morton	5–0	Elgin City	Greenock
15:00	McCluskey 48'; Johnstone 68'; Scullion 70', 83'; Forbes 74' (pen.)	BBC Sport Report		Stadium: Cappielow; Attendance: 1,052; Referee: Cook

1 August 2015	Queen's Park	0–2	Forfar Athletic	Glasgow
15:00		BBC Sport Report	Young 16'; Denholm 29'	Stadium: Hampden Park; Attendance: 441; Referee: Duncan

1 August 2015	Stranraer	2–0	Stenhousemuir	Stranraer
15:00	Malcolm 15', 90'	BBC Sport Report		Stadium: Stair Park; Attendance: 345; Referee: Robertson

1 August 2015	Ayr United	2–0	Brechin City	Ayr
15:00	McLauchlan 12'; Boyle 64'	BBC Sport Report		Stadium: Somerset Park; Attendance: 976; Referee: Anderson

2 August 2015	Rangers	3–0	Peterhead	Glasgow
15:00	Templeton 41'; Miller 76'; Tavernier 82'	BBC Sport Report		Stadium: Ibrox Stadium; Attendance: 25,608; Referee: Aitken

== Second round ==
The second round draw took place on Monday 3 August 2015 at 2:30pm BST at the Hampden Park Stadium. The clubs that finished in the bottom 7 places of last season's Premiership entered at this stage joining the 15 first round winners.

=== Draw and Seeding ===
Pot 1	Pot 2
Scottish Premiership: 01. ~~Dundee~~; 02. ~~Hamilton Academical~~; 03. ~~Partick Thistle~~; 04. Ross County; 05. Kilmarnock; 06. Motherwell; 07. ~~St Mirren~~; Scottish Championship: 08. Heart of Midlothian; 09. Hibernian; 10. Rangers; 11. ~~Queen of the South~~	Scottish Championship: 12. Falkirk; 13. Raith Rovers; 14. Livingston; Scottish League One: 15. Greenock Morton; 16. ~~Stranraer~~; 17. ~~Forfar Athletic~~; 18. ~~Airdrieonians~~; 19. Dunfermline Athletic; 20. ~~Ayr United~~; Scottish League Two: 21. ~~East Fife~~; 22. ~~Berwick Rangers~~

=== Matches ===
25 August 2015	Ross County	2–0	Ayr United	Dingwall
19:45	Boyce 3'; Gardyne 50'	BBC Sport Report		Stadium: Global Energy Stadium; Attendance: 1,743; Referee: Charleston

25 August 2015	Forfar Athletic	1–2 (a.e.t.)	Heart of Midlothian	Forfar
19:45	Dunlop 84'; Denholm (yellow card) 90+1' (red card); Nichol (red card) 120+1'	BBC Sport Report	McHattie 74'; Paterson 107'	Stadium: Station Park; Attendance: 1,844; Referee: Aitken

25 August 2015	Kilmarnock	4–1	Berwick Rangers	Kilmarnock
19:45	Boyd 16' (pen.); McKenzie 70'; Slater 77'; Higginbotham 90'	BBC Sport Report	Lavery 55'	Stadium: Rugby Park; Attendance: McKendrick; Referee: 1,484

25 August 2015	Raith Rovers	2–1	Hamilton Academical	Kirkcaldy
19:45	Davidson 3'; Benedictus 81'	BBC Sport Report	Nadé 66'	Stadium: Stark's Park; Attendance: Roberston; Referee: 1,470

25 August 2015	Queen of the South	0–1	Greenock Morton	Dumfries
19:45		BBC Sport Report	Forbes 69'	Stadium: Palmerston Park; Attendance: 1,034; Referee: Dallas

25 August 2015	Dunfermline Athletic	3–1	Dundee	Dunfermline
19:45	El Bakhtaoui 11', 90+4'; Cardle 86'	BBC Sport Rerport	Hemmings 48'	Stadium: East End Park; Attendance: 3,806; Referee: Finnie

25 August 2015	Partick Thistle	0–1	Falkirk	Glasgow
19:45		BBC Sport Report	Grant 32'	Stadium: Firhill Stadium; Attendance: 2,221; Referee: Thomson

25 August 2015	East Fife	1–3 (a.e.t.)	Motherwell	Methil
19:45	Austin 60'	BBC Sport Report	Moult 80'; McDonald 103'; Ainsworth 107'	Stadium: Bayview Stadium; Attendance: 1,158; Referee: Cook

25 August 2015	St Mirren	2–3	Livingston	Paisley
19:45	Gallagher 16'; Mallan 45'	BBC Sport Report	Buchanan 41'; Mullen 45' (yellow card) 90+1' (red card); Gallagher 84'	Stadium: St Mirren Park; Attendance: 1,568; Referee: Colvin

26 August 2015	Hibernian	1–0	Stranraer	Edinburgh
19:45	Rumsby 54' (o.g.)	BBC Sport Report		Stadium: Easter Road; Attendance: 5,224; Referee: Clancy

26 August 2015	Airdrieonians	0–5	Rangers	Airdrie
19:45		BBC Sport Report	Clark 5'; Halliday 14'; Waghorn 15'; Shiels 84'; Tavernier 88'	Stadium: Excelsior Stadium; Attendance: 7,006; Referee: Anderson

== Third round ==
The third round draw took place on Thursday 27 August 2015 at 2:30pm BST at the Hampden Park Stadium. The 4 clubs that participated in the 2014–15 Scottish Premiership season and qualified for European competition entered the competition at this stage along with Dundee United, the highest placed non-Europe qualifying side.

=== Draw and Seeding ===
Pot 1	Pot 2
Scottish Premiership: 01. Celtic; 02. ~~Aberdeen~~; 03. Inverness Caledonian Thistle; 04. St Johnstone; 05. Dundee United; 06. Ross County; 07. ~~Kilmarnock~~; 08. ~~Motherwell~~	Scottish Championship: 09. Heart of Midlothian; 10. Hibernian; 11. ~~Rangers~~; 12. ~~Falkirk~~; 13. ~~Raith Rovers~~; 14. ~~Livingston~~; Scottish League One: 15. Greenock Morton; 16. ~~Dunfermline Athletic~~

=== Matches ===
22 September 2015	Dundee United	3–1 (a.e.t.)	Dunfermline Athletic	Dundee
19:45	Morris 35'; Fraser 96'; Spittal 99'	BBC Sport Report	Paton 10'	Stadium: Tannadice Park; Attendance: 5,174; Referee: Beaton

22 September 2015	Livingston	0–2	Inverness Caledonian Thistle	Livingston
19:45		BBC Sport Report	Storey 12'; Devine 43'	Stadium: Tony Macaroni Arena; Attendance: 644; Referee: Muir

22 September 2015	Greenock Morton	3–2 (a.e.t.)	Motherwell	Greenock
19:45	Samuel 11', 100'; Tidser 112'	BBC Sport Report	McDonald 90+1'; Moult 116'	Stadium: Cappielow; Attendance: 2,539; Referee: Aitken

22 September 2015	Rangers	1–3	St Johnstone	Glasgow
19:15	Tavernier 62'	BBC Sport Report	Davidson 19'; Lappin 29'; O'Halloran 46'	Stadium: Ibrox Stadium; Attendance: 27,094; Referee: Clancy

22 September 2015	Ross County	7–0	Falkirk	Dingwall
19:45	Boyce 30', 35', 40'; De Vita 46'; Franks 54'; Graham 58'; Holden 81'	BBC Sport Report		Stadium: Global Energy Stadium; Attendance: 1,341; Referee: Finnie

23 September 2015	Celtic	2–0	Raith Rovers	Glasgow
19:45	Commons 32'; Johansen 87'	BBC Sport Report		Stadium: Celtic Park; Attendance: 13,591; Referee: McKendrick

23 September 2015	Hibernian	2–0	Aberdeen	Edinburgh
19:45	Cummings 82'; Malonga 88'	BBC Sport Report		Stadium: Easter Road; Attendance: 11,092; Referee: McLean

23 September 2015	Kilmarnock	2–3	Heart of Midlothian	Kilmarnock
19:45	Magennis 13', 80'	BBC Sport Report	Ozturk 74'; Juanma Delgado 90'; Nicholson 90'	Stadium: Rugby Park; Attendance: 3,249; Referee: Thomson

== Quarter-finals ==
=== Draw and Seeding ===
The quarter-final draw took place on Monday 28 September 2015 at 2:30pm at Hampden Park, all teams were placed in the same pot.

Pot 1

Scottish Premiership:
01. Celtic
02. ~~Inverness Caledonian Thistle~~
03. St Johnstone
04. ~~Dundee United~~
05. Ross County
06. ~~Heart of Midlothian~~

Scottish Championship:
07. Hibernian

Scottish League One:
08. ~~Greenock Morton~~

=== Matches ===
27 October 2015	Inverness Caledonian Thistle (1)	1–2	Ross County (1)	Inverness
19:05	Tansey 78'	BBC Sport Report	Irvine 41'; Gardyne 48'	Stadium: Caledonian Stadium; Attendance: 3,004; Referee: McLean

27 October 2015	Greenock Morton (3)	1–3	St Johnstone (1)	Greenock
19:45	Johnstone 52'	BBC Sport Report	MacLean 61' (pen.); O'Halloran 63'; Kane 83'	Stadium: Cappielow; Attendance: 2,433; Referee: Thomson

28 October 2015	Heart of Midlothian (1)	1–2	Celtic (1)	Edinburgh
19:45	Djoum 90'	BBC Sport Report	Griffiths 71'; Rogić 82'	Stadium: Tynecastle Stadium; Attendance: 11,598; Referee: John Beaton

4 November 2015	Hibernian (2)	3–0	Dundee United (1)	Edinburgh
19:45	Gray 20'; Cummings 61' (pen.); Stevenson 90'	BBC Sport Report		Stadium: Easter Road; Attendance: 11,891; Referee: Willie Collum

== Semi-finals ==
=== Draw and seeding ===
The semi-final draw took place on Monday 9 November 2015 at 2:00pm at Hampden Park, all teams were placed in the same pot.

Pot 1

Scottish Premiership:
01. ~~Celtic~~
02. ~~St Johnstone~~
03. Ross County

Scottish Championship:
04. Hibernian

=== Matches ===
30 January 2016	Hibernian (2)	2–1	St Johnstone (1)	Edinburgh
15:00	Cummings 29' (pen.); McGinn 74'	BBC Sport Report	Shaughnessy 33'	Stadium: Tynecastle Stadium; Attendance: 16,971; Referee: McLean

31 January 2016	Ross County (1)	3–1	Celtic (1)	Glasgow
15:00	M. Woods 15' (pen.); Quinn 48'; Schalk 63'	BBC Sport Report	Mackay-Steven 1'; Ambrose (red card) 13'	Stadium: Hampden Park; Attendance: 22,130; Referee: Thomson

== Final ==
13 March 2016
15:00

Hibernian	1–2	Ross County
Fontaine 45'	BBC Sport Report	Gardyne 25'; Schalk 90'

Hampden Park, Glasgow
Attendance: 38,296
Referee: Kevin Clancy

== Statistics ==
=== Top goalscorers ===
As of matches played on 13 March 2016

Rank	Player	Club	Goals
1	(Northern Ireland) Liam Boyce	Ross County	4
1	(Australia) Jason Cummings	Hibernian	4
1	(Morocco) Faissal El Bakhtaoui	Dunfermline Athletic	4
4	(Scotland) Michael Gardyne	Ross County	3
4	(England) James Tavernier	Rangers	3
5	18 players		2
