= Jason Cummings =

Australian football player

Personal information
- Full name: Jason Steven Cummings
- Date of birth: 1 August 1995 (age 31)
- Place of birth: Edinburgh, Scotland
- Height: 1.78 m (5 ft 10 in)
- Position: Striker

Team information
- Current team: Cong An Ho Chi Minh City
- Number: 9

Youth career
- 2001–2007: Hutchison Vale
- 2007–2012: Heart of Midlothian
- 2012–2013: Hutchison Vale
- 2013: Hibernian

Senior career*
Years	Team	Apps	(Gls)
2013–2017	Hibernian	114	(56)
2017–2019	Nottingham Forest	14	(1)
2018	→ Rangers (loan)	15	(2)
2018–2019	→ Peterborough United (loan)	22	(6)
2019	→ Luton Town (loan)	5	(1)
2019–2021	Shrewsbury Town	35	(4)
2021–2022	Dundee	29	(11)
2022–2023	Central Coast Mariners	49	(30)
2023–2026	Mohun Bagan	61	(21)
2026–	Cong An Ho Chi Minh City	0	(0)

International career^{‡}
2014	Scotland U19	1	(0)
2015–2016	Scotland U21	8	(3)
2017–2018	Scotland	2	(0)
2022–2023	Australia	3	(1)
- * Club domestic league appearances and goals as of 15:53, 13 August 2026 (UTC) ‡ National team caps and goals as of 28 March 2023

Jason Steven Cummings (born 1 August 1995) is a professional soccer player who plays as a striker for V.League 1 club Cong An Ho Chi Minh City. Born in Scotland, he represents the Australia national team, after previously representing Scotland at youth and senior international level.

Cummings started his professional career with Hibernian, making 16 appearances and scoring twice in the 2013–14 season. He was their top goal scorer over each of the next three seasons, scoring more than 20 goals each season, making him the first player to achieve this feat for over 50 years. These goals helped Hibs win the Scottish Cup in 2016 and promotion in 2017. He moved to Nottingham Forest in June 2017, but did not play regularly for their first team and was loaned to Rangers in January 2018, Peterborough United in July 2018 and Luton Town in January 2019. After a spell with Shrewsbury Town, Cummings signed for Dundee in 2021 and with them he would once again gain promotion to the Scottish Premiership. In 2022 Cummings signed for A-League Men club Central Coast Mariners, winning the league in 2022–23 and receiving the Joe Marston Medal for player of the match in the final, having scored a hat-trick.

He made his first full international appearance for Scotland in November 2017, but subsequently made himself available for selection by Australia. Cummings made his first appearance for them in September 2022, and was then selected in their 2022 World Cup squad.

== Club career ==
=== Hibernian ===
Cummings grew up a Hearts fan and attended Tynecastle High School. He played for local boys team Hutchison Vale and then joined the Hearts youth program. After struggling with injuries, Cummings was released by Hearts in 2012. After an impressive season with Hutchison Vale he was signed by Hibernian in the summer of 2013. Cummings made his debut senior appearance for Hibernian in a Scottish Premiership match against Inverness Caledonian Thistle in November 2013. Cummings scored his first career goals on 21 May 2014, netting twice as Hibernian won 2–0 against Hamilton Academical in the first leg of the promotion/relegation play-off. Hibs lost the return match 2–0 and Cummings missed the decisive kick in the penalty shoot-out, which resulted in Hibs being relegated to the Scottish Championship.

Cummings won the SPFL Young Player of the Month award for September 2014, after his two goals helped Hibs to beat Rangers in Glasgow. On 16 February 2016, Cummings became the first Hibs player to score in four consecutive Edinburgh derbies for 42 years after scoring the winner against Hearts in a Scottish Cup 4th round replay. On 16 April 2016, Cummings missed a penalty kick with a Panenka attempt in the Scottish Cup semi-final against Dundee United, which ended goalless, although he later scored the winning kick in the penalty shoot-out. He then played the first 65 minutes of the final, assisting Anthony Stokes' opening goal as Hibs won 3–2 against Rangers.

During the 2016 close season, Cummings signed a new four-year contract with Hibs. Peterborough United offered Hibs £1.2 million for Cummings in August 2016, but this proposal was rejected. He netted the winner in a 1–0 win Tannadice on 10 March 2017, and in doing so became the first Hibernian player to score more than twenty goals in three successive seasons since Joe Baker between 1957 and 1961. On 15 April, Hibs clinched the title and achieved promotion back to the Scottish Premiership after beating Queen of the South 3–0 at Easter Road. Later that day, Cummings tweeted that they had fulfilled his promise to return the team to the top flight. Cummings was nominated by PFA Scotland in their Young Player of the Year and Championship Player of the Year awards for 2016–17.

=== Nottingham Forest ===
Cummings signed a three-year contract with Nottingham Forest on 17 June 2017, moving for an undisclosed fee. As part of the deal Cummings former clubs Heart of Midlothian and Hutchison Vale were awarded a solidarity fee, due to his youth development. He scored his first goal for Forest on his debut in a 2–1 EFL Cup win against Shrewsbury Town on 8 August 2017.

==== Rangers (loan) ====
Cummings was loaned to Scottish Premiership side Rangers in January 2018 for the rest of the season, with Rangers holding an option to make the transfer permanent. He made his competitive debut for the club on 24 January, in a 2–0 win against Aberdeen. Cummings was one of four players to make their first appearance for Rangers in that game. He scored his first goal for Rangers four days later, in a 2–1 win at Ross County. On 4 March, Cummings scored a hat-trick for Rangers in a Scottish Cup quarter-final against Falkirk.

==== Peterborough United and Luton Town (loan) ====
On 13 July 2018, Cummings moved on a season-long loan to EFL League One side Peterborough United. In September 2018, Cummings was seen on video destroying his flat; chairman Darragh MacAnthony called the behaviour "daft" and said that it had been dealt with by the club, and manager Steve Evans told the media that it had been caused by the end of a relationship. After a strong start, scoring six goals in his first five league games, Cummings began to struggle for goals and his loan was terminated by Peterborough on 30 January 2019.

Later that month, Cummings was loaned to League One leaders Luton Town. He scored his first goal for Luton on 6 April 2019, coming on as a substitute against Blackpool, netting an equaliser in the 86th minute with the game finishing 2–2.

=== Shrewsbury Town ===
On 2 September 2019, it was announced that Cummings had signed for League One side Shrewsbury Town for an undisclosed fee. He made his debut for the club on 14 September, coming on as a 68th-minute substitute for Daniel Udoh away at A.F.C. Wimbledon, and five minutes later, he scored the equaliser in a 1–1 draw. Cummings scored in wins against Southend United and Sunderland, but minor injuries and illnesses over Christmas 2019 meant he was largely used as a substitute during January 2020. On 26 January 2020, Cummings came off the bench to net twice in a 2–2 draw with Liverpool in the FA Cup fourth round.

=== Dundee ===
On 28 January 2021, Cummings returned to Scotland to sign with Dundee, on a deal until the summer of 2022. Despite only joining in January, Cummings would finish the season as Dundee's joint-top league scorer, and played an important role in helping the club win the Premiership play-offs and gaining promotion to the Premiership.

On 31 July 2021, Cummings scored in Dundee's first game back in the Scottish Premiership since the 2018–19 season in their 2–2 draw with St Mirren. In December 2021, Cummings was sent home from training after showing up unfit to train. Amid interest from A-League side Central Coast Mariners, Cummings left Dundee in January 2022.

=== Central Coast Mariners ===
Cummings signed an 18-month contract with Central Coast Mariners in January 2022. He scored in his A-League Men debut against Sydney FC on 30 January 2022. Football Australia rejected an application from the Mariners to allow Cummings to play in the 2021 FFA Cup final, which Cummings was ineligibile for as he was signed after the 2021 FFA Cup semifinals. Cummings finished the 2021–22 A-League Men season with ten goals from 21 appearances after joining the competition mid-season.

Cummings would have a very successful stint with the Mariners over two seasons, culminating in scoring a hat-trick in a 6–1 victory over Melbourne City in the 2023 A-League Men Grand Final, with Cummings receiving the Joe Marston Medal as the Grand Final's player of the match. In the Championship winning season, Cummings broke the record for most league goals in a season for the Mariners, having scored 20 goals, and was named in the PFA A-League Team of the Season.

Cummings departed the Mariners after the Grand Final win, with the club describing him as a "legend".

=== Mohun Bagan ===
In June 2023, Cummings joined Indian Super League club Mohun Bagan following his departure from the Central Coast Mariners. Cummings made his debut in the Durand Cup, coming on as a second-half substitute in the Kolkata Derby against East Bengal which ended in a 1–0 loss for which he was heavily criticised for missing chances. He scored his first goal on his full debut against Machhindra F.C. at AFC Cup preliminary round 2 in a 3–1 win. He scored again in next match this time by a penalty in a 3–1 win over Abahani Limited Dhaka in AFC Cup Play-off round. Cummings won his first silverware with Mohun Bagan in a Kolkata Derby win in the final of the 2023 Durand Cup.

Cummings made his league debut on 23 September, scoring a goal in their 3–1 win over newly promoted club Punjab. Mohun Bagan would win the League Shield at the end of the regular season.

On 7 March 2025, Mohun Bagan lifted the ISL League Shield as regular season champions, with Stewart scoring at the end of the victory over Goa in the final game of the season. On 12 April, Cummings scored a penalty in the Indian Super League final and lifted the trophy after defeating Bengaluru in extra time.

== International career ==
=== Scotland ===
Cummings played for the Scotland under-19 and under-21 teams. He received his first call-up to the senior Scotland squad in November 2017, and made his first full international appearance in a friendly against the Netherlands.

=== Australia ===
Cummings is of Australian descent through his mother Tracey who was born in Perth, and is a dual citizen of the United Kingdom and Australia. In July 2019, Australia manager Graham Arnold said that he wanted Cummings to play for the Socceroos, which was still possible as he had only played two friendlies for Scotland. In September 2019, Cummings told The Sun newspaper he was considering switching from Scotland to Australia and had already spoken with Socceroos assistant manager Rene Meulensteen. Talks silenced for a while, however, when the COVID-19 pandemic struck. Cummings said in March 2021 that he hoped "Australia are still looking out for me, if I get the call I'll be over there in a heartbeat".

In September 2022, Cummings was selected in the Australian squad to play two friendlies against New Zealand. He made his debut and scored a penalty as a second-half substitute in the second match, in Auckland. In November 2022, he was named in Australia's squad for the 2022 FIFA World Cup. Cummings made his World Cup debut in Australia's opening match against France, coming on as a substitute in the 56th minute.

== Career statistics ==
=== Club ===
As of match played 21 May 2026

Appearances and goals by club, season and competition
Club	Season	League			National cup (Note: Includes Scottish Cup, FA Cup, Australia Cup, Super Cup)		League cup (Note: Includes Scottish League Cup, EFL Cup, Durand Cup)		Continental		Other		Total	
Club	Season	Division	Apps	Goals	Apps	Goals	Apps	Goals	Apps	Goals	Apps	Goals	Apps	Goals
Hibernian	2013–14	Scottish Premiership	16	0	—		—		—		2 (Note: Appearances in Scottish Championship promotion play-offs)	2	18	2
Hibernian	2014–15	Scottish Championship	33	18	4	1	3	1	—		2	1	42	21
Hibernian	2015–16	Scottish Championship	33	18	5	2	6	4	—		5 (Note: One appearance and one goal in Scottish Challenge Cup, four appearances in Scottish Championship promotion play-offs)	1	49	25
Hibernian	2016–17	Scottish Championship	32	19	5	4	1	0	2 (Note: Appearances in UEFA Europa League)	0	1 (Note: Appearance in Scottish Challenge Cup)	0	41	23
Hibernian	Total		114	55	14	7	10	5	2	0	10	4	150	71
Nottingham Forest	2017–18	Championship	14	1	—		3	3	—		—		17	4
Nottingham Forest	Total		14	1	—		3	3	—		—		17	4
Rangers (loan)	2017–18	Scottish Premiership	15	2	3	4	—		—		—		18	6
Rangers (loan)	Total		15	2	3	4	—		—		—		18	6
Peterborough United (loan)	2018–19	League One	22	6	4	0	1	0	—		2 (Note: Appearances in EFL Trophy)	2	29	8
Peterborough United (loan)	Total		22	6	4	0	1	0	—		2	2	29	8
Luton Town (loan)	2018–19	League One	5	1	—		—		—		—		5	1
Luton Town (loan)	Total		5	1	—		—		—		—		5	1
Shrewsbury Town	2019–20	League One	24	4	6	2	1	1	—		0	0	31	7
Shrewsbury Town	2020–21	League One	11	0	2	0	1	1	—		3	2	17	3
Shrewsbury Town	Total		35	4	8	2	2	2	—		3	2	48	10
Dundee	2020–21	Scottish Championship	15	8	1	0	0	0	—		2 (Note: Appearances in Scottish Premiership play-offs)	0	18	8
Dundee	2021–22	Scottish Premiership	14	3	0	0	4	3	—		—		18	6
Dundee	Total		29	11	1	0	4	3	—		2	0	36	14
Central Coast Mariners	2021–22	A-League Men	21	10	—		—		—		—		21	10
Central Coast Mariners	2022–23	A-League Men	28	20	1	1	—		—		—		29	21
Central Coast Mariners	Total		49	30	1	1	—		—		0	0	50	31
Mohun Bagan	2023–24	Indian Super League	23	12	3 (Note: Appearance(s)in AIFF Super Cup)	1	4	2	7 (Note: Appearances in AFC Cup)	4	—		37	19
Mohun Bagan	2024–25	Indian Super League	25	7	0	0	4	4	1 (Note: Appearances in AFC Champions League Two)	0	—		30	11
Mohun Bagan	2025–26	Indian Super League	13	2	3	0	2	1	1	0	3 (Note: Appearance(s) in IFA Shield)	1	22	4
Mohun Bagan	Total		61	21	6	1	10	7	9	4	3	1	89	34
Career total			344	131	37	15	30	20	11	4	20	9	441	179

=== International ===
As of match played 28 March 2023

Appearances and goals by national team and year
National team	Year	Apps	Goals
Scotland	2017	1	0
Scotland	2018	1	0
Scotland	Total	2	0
Australia	2022	2	1
Australia	2023	1	0
Australia	Total	3	1
Career total		5	1

International goals

Scores and results list Australia's goal tally first.

List of international goals scored by Jason Cummings
No.	Date	Venue	Opponent	Score	Result	Competition
1	25 September 2022	Eden Park, Auckland, New Zealand	New Zealand	2–0	2–0	Friendly

== Honours ==
Hibernian

- Scottish Championship: 2016–17
- Scottish Cup: 2015–16
- Scottish League Cup runner-up: 2015-16

Luton Town

- EFL League One: 2018–19

Dundee

- Scottish Premiership play-offs: 2020–21

Central Coast Mariners

- A-League Men Championship: 2022–23

Mohun Bagan

- Indian Super League Shield: 2023–24, 2024–25
- Indian Super League Cup: 2024–25; runner-up: 2023–24
- Durand Cup: 2023; runner-up: 2024
- IFA Shield: 2025

Individual

- SPFL Young Player of the Month: September 2014, April 2015
- Scottish Championship Player of the Month: October 2015, August 2016
- PFA Scotland Championship Team of the Year: 2015–16, 2016–17
- A-Leagues All Star: 2022
- PFA A-League Team of the Season: 2022–23
- Joe Marston Medal: 2023
- Indian Super League Team of the Season: 2024–25

== See also ==
- List of association footballers who have been capped for two senior national teams
- List of Australia international soccer players born outside Australia
