= James Keatings =

Scottish footballer (born 1992)

Personal information
- Date of birth: 20 January 1992 (age 34)
- Place of birth: Glasgow, Scotland
- Height: 1.82 m (6 ft 0 in)
- Position: Forward

Youth career
- Wishaw Wycombe Wanderers
- 2003–2011: Celtic

Senior career*
Years	Team	Apps	(Gls)
2010–2013	Celtic	0	(0)
2012	→ St Johnstone (loan)	4	(0)
2012	→ Hamilton Academical (loan)	8	(2)
2013–2014	Hamilton Academical	30	(13)
2014–2015	Heart of Midlothian	29	(11)
2015–2017	Hibernian	52	(14)
2017–2018	Dundee United	16	(3)
2018–2019	Hamilton Academical	17	(1)
2019–2021	Inverness Caledonian Thistle	38	(8)
2021–2022	Raith Rovers	3	(0)
2021–2022	→ Montrose (loan)	4	(1)
2022–2023	Forfar Athletic	4	(0)
2023	Tranent	4	(0)

International career^{‡}
2007–2008	Scotland U16	6	(4)
2008	Scotland U17	6	(1)
2009–2010	Scotland U19	6	(4)
- * Club domestic league appearances and goals as of 22 April 2023 ‡ National team caps and goals as of 19:29, 6 May 2017 (UTC)

James Keatings (born 20 January 1992) is a former Scottish professional footballer who plays as a forward. He has previously played for Celtic, Heart of Midlothian, St Johnstone, Hibernian, Dundee United, Hamilton Academical, Inverness Caledonian Thistle, Raith Rovers, Montrose, Forfar Athletic and Tranent Juniors.

== Club career ==
=== Celtic ===
Raised in Wishaw, Keatings joined Celtic's youth system from local boys club Wishaw Wycombe Wanderers at a young age and captained the under-17 side. While a member of the Glasgow club's under-19s, he was named as a substitute for the first team's game against Hibernian on 10 November 2010. He made the bench on one further occasion before suffering a cruciate knee injury in April; despite the injury, he still finished the under-19s' top scorer with 25 goals. In June 2011, he was rewarded with a new three-year contract extending his stay until 2014.

After a long rehabilitation and playing with the Celtic development squad, he was sent out on loan to aid his recovery.

==== St Johnstone (loan) ====
On 30 January 2012, Keatings joined fellow Scottish Premier League club St Johnstone on loan until the end of the season. He made his debut on 5 February as a substitute against Hearts in the Scottish Cup, with his SPL debut coming on 25 February against Dunfermline Athletic. In all he made five appearances for the club.

==== Hamilton Academical (loan) ====
On 24 August 2012, Keatings joined First Division club Hamilton Academical on a loan deal. The next day, he made his debut coming on as a substitute in the second half, in a 1–0 loss against Cowdenbeath. On 22 September 2012, Keatings came on as a second-half substitute scored twice, in a 3–3 comeback against Dumbarton. By the January transfer window, Keatings' spell with Hamilton had been terminated after his loan was cancelled.

=== Hamilton Academical ===
After ten years with Celtic, Keatings was released by the club in summer 2013. Ahead of the new 2013–14 season, he went to Australia to have trials at Brisbane Roar and Newcastle Jets. Despite an offer in Australia he joined Hamilton on a permanent deal on 18 July, signing a one-year contract having impressed the club during pre-season training. At the time, he said that he hoped joining the club would help him get his career back on track.

Keatings made a perfect start for the club when he scored twice in the first round of the League Cup as they beat Stirling Albion 3–0. In the league, he scored three goals in two games against Raith Rovers and Dumbarton. He scored twice in a 2–0 win over Livingston on 5 October 2013, ending a goalscoring drought of six matches. However, he sustained a calf injury during a match against Raith Rovers and was sidelined for two weeks. He made his return in a 3–0 loss to Dundee on 23 November 2013. Keatings would score another three goals in two games against Cowdenbeath and Dumbarton, which put his goal tally at ten. After the match, he stated that he believed the promotion race in the Scottish Championship would go all the way in the remaining 15 matches. Keatings scored his 15th goal of the season in all competitions in a match against Raith Rovers on 25 March 2014. He said after the match: "I hadn't scored in three games and managed to put a header in the corner. The position I'm playing in means I haven't had many chances like that, it's probably the only one that has dropped to me in the box, and I'm delighted. Hopefully I get more and achieve my target."

Despite initially indicating he would sign a new contract with Accies following their promotion to the Scottish Premiership, Keatings rejected the club's offer. In all he made 35 appearances, scoring 15 times over the course of the season.

=== Heart of Midlothian ===
On 13 June 2014, it was announced Keatings had signed a two-year contract with recently relegated Scottish Championship side Heart of Midlothian. After joining Hearts, Keatings said joining the club made him "over the moon to have the opportunity to sign for a big club like this after leaving Hamilton." In his first league start, he scored a hat-trick in a 4–0 victory over Raith Rovers at Stark's Park. Keatings scored a "fantastic" goal against Queen of the South at home in a 4–1 victory, for his fifth league goal of the season. He was released by Hearts at the end of the 2014–15 season, having only served half of his initial two-year contract.

=== Hibernian ===
On 1 June 2015, Keatings signed a two-year contract with Hearts' Edinburgh rivals, Championship side Hibernian. In his first league start for Hibs he scored the opening goal in a 2–0 victory over Raith Rovers at Easter Road. On 7 November, he scored a hat-trick for Hibs in a 4–1 win at St Mirren. He netted twice against Falkirk in the second leg of the play-off semi-final, although Hibs eventually lost the match 3–2. He came on as a substitute in the 2016 Scottish Cup final, which Hibs won 3–2 against Rangers.

Keatings scored eight goals in 30 appearances for Hibs during the 2016–17 season, as they earned promotion to the Premiership.

=== Dundee United ===
Dundee United announced on 8 May 2017 that they had reached an agreement to sign Keatings when his contract with Hibernian expired, the player having made a decision to make a 'fresh start'. He spent one season with United, during which they failed to achieve promotion and he struggled with his mental and physical health. Having decided to commute to Dundee from his home in Lanarkshire, he later remarked that the travelling distances were a factor in his ongoing depression during the period, as well as injuries and personal family issues.

=== Return to Hamilton ===
On 31 August 2018, Keatings signed for Hamilton Academical for a third time, with the club having remained in the Premiership throughout the four years since his previous departure. His mental health improved at a club he knew well and which was far closer to his home. Keatings left Hamilton in May 2019 after his contract was mutually terminated.

=== Inverness Caledonian Thistle ===
On 13 May 2019, Inverness Caledonian Thistle announced the pre-contract signing of Keatings on a two-year deal. In February 2020, Keatings was at the centre of widespread media attention after he was sent off (a second yellow card) for simulation (diving) in the Scottish Challenge Cup semi-final win over Rangers Under-21s despite appearing to be body-checked by his opponent, meaning he would miss the final through suspension.

After the club appealed in an effort to overturn the referee's decision, it was ruled the ban would be upheld, with no further explanation. This led to reactions from fans and from pundits such as Gary Lineker, who stated "Not even close to a dive. Would be an injustice to miss out on a cup final for this." The Scottish Football Association then rescinded the ban a week later, stating that the original appeal panel members had not considered all the available evidence, meaning their decision was "not competent".

=== Raith Rovers ===
Keatings signed a pre-contract agreement with Raith Rovers in March 2021, a two-year agreement due to begin in the summer of 2021.

In September 2021 Keatings moved on loan to League One club Montrose.

=== Forfar Athletic ===
Despite struggling in his time with Raith and Montrose with a hip injury, Keatings joined Scottish League Two side Forfar Athletic with a vow "to resurrect his playing career".

== Personal life ==
In September 2025, Keatings was sentenced to 13 months' imprisonment, for money laundering, at Falkirk Sherriff Court.

== International career ==
Keatings has represented Scotland at under-16, under-17 and under-19 level.

== Career statistics ==
As of 23 March 2021

Appearances and goals by club, season and competition
Club	Season	League			Scottish Cup		League Cup		Europe		Other		Total	
Club	Season	Division	Apps	Goals	Apps	Goals	Apps	Goals	Apps	Goals	Apps	Goals	Apps	Goals
Celtic	2010–11	Scottish Premier League	0	0	0	0	0	0	0	0	—		0	0
Celtic	2011–12	Scottish Premier League	0	0	0	0	0	0	0	0	—		0	0
Celtic	2012–13	Scottish Premier League	0	0	0	0	0	0	0	0	—		0	0
Celtic	Total		0	0	0	0	0	0	0	0	0	0	0	0
St Johnstone (loan)	2011–12	Scottish Premier League	4	0	1	0	0	0	—		—		5	0
Hamilton Academical (loan)	2012–13	Scottish First Division	8	2	0	0	2	0	—		0	0	10	2
Hamilton Academical	2013–14	Scottish Championship	30	13	0	0	2	2	—		3 (Note: One appearance in the Scottish Challenge Cup and two in the Premiership play-offs)	0	35	15
Heart of Midlothian	2014–15	Scottish Championship	29	11	1	0	2	0	—		1 (Note: Appearances in the Scottish Challenge Cup)	0	33	11
Hibernian	2015–16	Scottish Championship	28	9	5	1	4	0	—		4 (Note: Appearances in the Premiership play-offs)	2	41	12
Hibernian	2016–17 (Note: Soccerbase did not record two appearances made by Keatings against Brondby IF on 14 July and 21 July 2016. It also wrongly recorded an appearance by Brian Graham against Dundee United on 10 March 2017 as being made by Keatings.)	Scottish Championship	24	5	3	3	1	0	2 (Note: Appearances in the Europa League)	0	1	0	31	8
Hibernian	Total		52	14	8	4	5	0	2	0	5	2	72	20
Dundee United	2017–18	Scottish Championship	16	3	0	0	3	1	—		2	0	20	4
Dundee United	2018–19	Scottish Championship	0	0	0	0	1	0	—		0	0	1	0
Dundee United	Total		16	3	0	0	4	1	0	0	2	0	21	4
Hamilton Academical	2018–19	Scottish Premiership	17	1	0	0	0	0	—		—		17	1
Inverness Caledonian Thistle	2019–20	Scottish Championship	21	5	2	0	4	1	—		2	1	29	7
Inverness Caledonian Thistle	2020–21	Scottish Championship	17	3	1	1	4	1	—		0	0	22	5
Inverness Caledonian Thistle	Total		38	8	3	1	8	2	0	0	2	1	51	11
Career total			194	52	13	5	23	5	2	0	13	3	245	65

== Honours ==
Hamilton

- Scottish Championship Play Off: 2013–14

Heart of Midlothian

- Scottish Championship: 2014–15

Hibernian

- Scottish Cup: 2015–16
- Scottish Championship: 2016–17
