= Steven McLean =

Scottish football referee

- Full name: Steven McLean
- Born: April 1, 1981 (age 45)

Domestic
| Years | League | Role |
| 1997– | Scottish Football Association | Referee |
| 2007–2013 | SFL / SPL | Referee |
| 2013– | SPFL | Referee |

International
| Years | League | Role |
| 2010–2017 | FIFA listed | Referee |

Steven McLean (born 1 April 1981) is a Scottish football referee. He became a FIFA referee in 2010 and was selected to officiate at the 2011 UEFA U17 European Championship.

== Career ==
In October 2011 McLean was in charge of a 2013 European Under-21 qualifier involving Spain and Croatia.

In January 2012 McLean was the referee for a Scottish League Cup semi-final - an Ayrshire derby between Kilmarnock and Ayr United, won by the former who went on to lift the trophy.

In March 2014 McLean refereed his first major national final, the 2014 Scottish League Cup Final between Aberdeen and Inverness Caledonian Thistle which Aberdeen won in a penalty shoot-out. However at the end of the league season he angered Aberdeen manager Derek McInnes by failing to award a foul in the last minute of their match with Motherwell, permitting Motherwell to score the winning goal and thereby overtake Aberdeen in the standings.

In 2015, McLean took charge of a League Cup semi-final between Aberdeen and Dundee United, and a Scottish Cup semi-final between Inverness CT and Celtic; he and his assistants came in for criticism for their performance in the latter match, where they missed an apparent deliberate handball by an Inverness defender in his own penalty area at a pivotal point in the game.

McLean was in-charge of another semi-final in January 2016 when Hibernian met St Johnstone in the League Cup.

In May 2016 McLean was selected to officiate his first Scottish Cup final, the 2016 edition at Hampden Park involving Rangers and Hibernian, and was also chosen for Scottish football's most high-profile domestic league fixture, the Old Firm derby, on Hogmanay 2016 - both matches passed with no controversy on the part of the officials.

McLean was not selected on the SFA's list of international FIFA officials for 2017. He was appointed fourth official for the Scottish Cup final in 2018 and 2024 and the League Cup final in 2024. He was also the first-ever Video Assistant Referee deployed at a Scottish Cup final, in 2023. He was appointed as a FIFA VAR official in 2025.

== Other work ==
As of 2016, McLean was employed full-time by the SFA as a recruitment and education officer for referees and is also a qualified fitness instructor and physiotherapist (member of CSP). He left his role with Scottish FA in 2019 has since operated two physiotherapy clinics in the West of Scotland.

== Personal life ==
He is the son of former Kilmarnock player Stuart McLean and the brother of footballer Brian McLean.
