= Mark Oxley =

English footballer (born 1990)

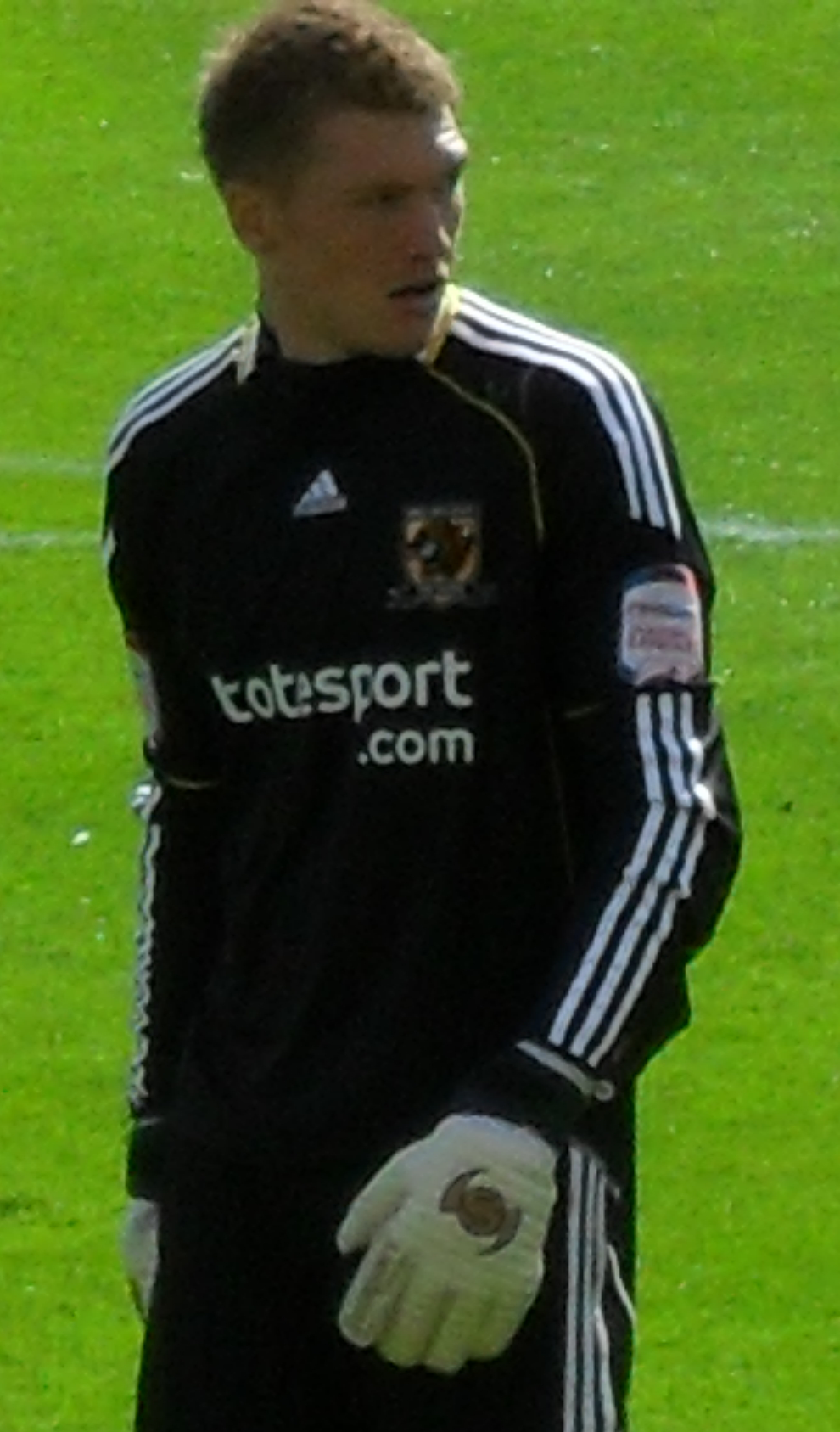
- Oxley playing for Hull City in 2010

Personal information
- Full name: Mark Thomas Oxley
- Date of birth: 28 September 1990 (age 36)
- Place of birth: Sheffield, England
- Height: 6 ft 3 in (1.91 m)
- Position: Goalkeeper

Team information
- Current team: Harrogate Town
- Number: 1

Youth career
- –2007: Rotherham United

Senior career*
| Years | Team | Apps | (Gls) |
| 2007–2008 | Rotherham United | 0 | (0) |
| 2008–2015 | Hull City | 1 | (0) |
| 2009 | → Walsall (loan) | 0 | (0) |
| 2010 | → Grimsby Town (loan) | 1 | (0) |
| 2010 | → Grimsby Town (loan) | 2 | (0) |
| 2012 | → Burton Albion (loan) | 3 | (0) |
| 2013–2014 | → Oldham Athletic (loan) | 36 | (0) |
| 2014–2015 | → Hibernian (loan) | 35 | (1) |
| 2015–2016 | Hibernian | 34 | (0) |
| 2016–2021 | Southend United | 151 | (0) |
| 2021– | Harrogate Town | 80 | (0) |

International career
| 2008 | England U18 | 1 | (0) |
- * Club domestic league appearances and goals as of 22:20, 12 November 2025 (UTC)

Mark Thomas Oxley (born 28 September 1990) is an English professional footballer who plays as a goalkeeper for National League club Harrogate Town.

Oxley began his professional career with Rotherham United in 2007 but moved to Hull City a year later. Whilst with Hull, Oxley has spent spells on loan with Walsall, Grimsby Town, Burton Albion, Oldham Athletic and Hibernian. After being released by Hull City in 2015, he signed on a permanent basis for Hibernian. Oxley was capped by both the England under-18 and England under-20 sides.

== Club career ==
=== Rotherham United ===
Oxley joined Rotherham United as a youngster and was promoted to the club's first team during the 2007–08 season.

=== Hull City ===
After being scouted by several bigger clubs, he joined newly promoted Premier League club Hull City in August 2008 for a fee of £150,000. Oxley became the club's fifth choice goalkeeper, behind Boaz Myhill, Matt Duke, Tony Warner and Tom Woodhead. For the 2009–10 season, Oxley moved up to number four keeper at the KC Stadium, but was to be sent out on loan to Walsall in October 2009. He would only manage to make the bench for The Saddlers, and he departed a month later after failing to make a single appearance. On 25 February 2010, Oxley signed a one-month loan deal with Grimsby Town, becoming the third Hull player to be loaned out to Grimsby that season, following teammates Nicky Featherstone and Jamie Devitt. Oxley would go straight into the starting line up to face Dagenham & Redbridge on 27 February, after replacing regular number one Nick Colgan, who was rested by manager Neil Woods. The game ended in a 2–0 defeat for Grimsby, and when the club's next match against Shrewsbury Town came around, Oxley was dropped to the bench in favour of Colgan.

On Friday 2 April 2010, Oxley rejoined Grimsby for a second loan spell, this time an emergency seven-day loan, following injuries to Nick Colgan and reserve Leigh Overton which left the club without a fit goalkeeper for their clash with Northampton Town. Oxley played in the 2–1 home defeat against Northampton, as well as the Easter Monday 3–2 victory over Accrington Stanley. Both Hull and Grimsby had suffered relegations by the end of the 2009–10 season. Following the sale of Boaz Myhill in the summer of 2010, Oxley was a regular on the bench for Hull in the 2010–11 season.

On 26 October 2012, Oxley went on a month-long loan spell to Burton Albion, Although he had to return to Hull following a broken finger after some good performances for the Staffordshire club. On 12 January 2013 Oxley made his league debut for Hull when he came on as a substitute for Eldin Jakupović in the 3–1 loss at home to Sheffield Wednesday. Oxley signed a new two-year contract with the Tigers on 11 June 2013 following the club's promotion to the Premier League.

In July 2013, Oldham Athletic signed Oxley on a season long loan, but was recalled on 27 March 2014. After spending the 2014–15 season on loan at Hibernian, Oxley was released by Hull City.

=== Hibernian ===
On 28 July 2014, Hibernian signed Oxley on a six-month loan, with a view to extending to the end of the season. Oxley scored with a clearance on his league debut for Hibs in a 2–1 win against Livingston on 9 August 2014, to become the first goalkeeper to score for Hibs since Andy Goram netted against Greenock Morton in 1988. When two of Hull's goalkeepers were injured in October 2014, manager Steve Bruce suggested that Oxley would be recalled to Hull, but this was prevented by international transfer regulations. It was confirmed in January 2015, that the loan to Hibs would be extended to the end of the 2014–15 season.

In June 2015, he signed a two-year contract with Hibs. Oxley was the regular goalkeeper for most of the 2015–16 season, but lost his place to Conrad Logan near the end of the season. His first team place was initially lost due to a one match cup ban, triggered following a booking for time wasting which Oxley claimed was actually the result of a lost contact lens. He was later an unused substitute as Hibs won the 2016 Scottish Cup final.

=== Southend United ===
Oxley signed a two-year contract with Southend United in July 2016.

After a string of stunning performances during the 2017–18 season, Oxley was voted fans Player of the Season and Players' Player of the Season at the end of the campaign. On 4 June 2018 Oxley signed a new three-year contract at Southend. On 2 August 2018 Oxley was named as captain.

=== Harrogate Town ===
On 1 July 2021, Oxley joined League Two side Harrogate Town following Southend's relegation out of the Football League.

== International career ==
Oxley has been capped at International level for both the England under-18 and England under-20 sides.

== Career statistics ==
As of match played 8 November 2025

Appearances and goals by club, season and competition
| Club | Season | League | | | National Cup | | League Cup | | Other | | Total | |
| Club | Season | Division | Apps | Goals | Apps | Goals | Apps | Goals | Apps | Goals | Apps | Goals |
|---|---|---|---|---|---|---|---|---|---|---|---|---|
| Rotherham United | 2007–08 | League Two | 0 | 0 | 0 | 0 | 0 | 0 | 0 | 0 | 0 | 0 |
| Hull City | 2008–09 | Premier League | 0 | 0 | 0 | 0 | 0 | 0 | — | | 0 | 0 |
| Hull City | 2009–10 | Premier League | 0 | 0 | 0 | 0 | 0 | 0 | — | | 0 | 0 |
| Hull City | 2010–11 | Championship | 0 | 0 | 0 | 0 | 0 | 0 | — | | 0 | 0 |
| Hull City | 2011–12 | Championship | 0 | 0 | 0 | 0 | 0 | 0 | — | | 0 | 0 |
| Hull City | 2012–13 | Championship | 1 | 0 | 0 | 0 | 0 | 0 | — | | 1 | 0 |
| Hull City | 2013–14 | Premier League | 0 | 0 | 0 | 0 | 0 | 0 | — | | 0 | 0 |
| Hull City | 2014–15 | Premier League | 0 | 0 | 0 | 0 | 0 | 0 | 0 | 0 | 0 | 0 |
| Hull City | Total | | 1 | 0 | 0 | 0 | 0 | 0 | 0 | 0 | 1 | 0 |
| Walsall (loan) | 2009–10 | League One | 0 | 0 | 0 | 0 | 0 | 0 | 0 | 0 | 0 | 0 |
| Grimsby Town (loan) | 2009–10 | League Two | 3 | 0 | 0 | 0 | 0 | 0 | 0 | 0 | 3 | 0 |
| Burton Albion (loan) | 2012–13 | League Two | 3 | 0 | 2 | 0 | 0 | 0 | 0 | 0 | 5 | 0 |
| Oldham Athletic (loan) | 2013–14 | League One | 36 | 0 | 5 | 0 | 1 | 0 | 1 (Note: Appearance in Football League Trophy) | 0 | 43 | 0 |
| Hibernian (loan) | 2014–15 | Scottish Championship | 35 | 1 | 4 | 0 | 3 | 0 | 3 (Note: One appearance in Scottish Challenge Cup, two appearances in Premiership play-offs) | 0 | 45 | 1 |
| Hibernian | 2015–16 | Scottish Championship | 34 | 0 | 5 | 0 | 6 | 0 | 1 (Note: Appearance in Scottish Challenge Cup) | 0 | 46 | 0 |
| Hibernian | Total | | 69 | 1 | 9 | 0 | 9 | 0 | 4 | 0 | 91 | 1 |
| Southend United | 2016–17 | League One | 20 | 0 | 1 | 0 | 1 | 0 | 2 (Note: Appearances in EFL Trophy) | 0 | 24 | 0 |
| Southend United | 2017–18 | League One | 46 | 0 | 1 | 0 | 0 | 0 | 4 | 0 | 51 | 0 |
| Southend United | 2018–19 | League One | 25 | 0 | 3 | 0 | 1 | 0 | 1 | 0 | 30 | 0 |
| Southend United | 2019–20 | League One | 19 | 0 | 0 | 0 | 0 | 0 | 1 | 0 | 20 | 0 |
| Southend United | 2020–21 | League Two | 41 | 0 | 1 | 0 | 1 | 0 | 1 | 0 | 44 | 0 |
| Southend United | Total | | 151 | 0 | 6 | 0 | 3 | 0 | 9 | 0 | 169 | 0 |
| Harrogate Town | 2021–22 | League Two | 41 | 0 | 3 | 0 | 0 | 0 | 4 | 0 | 48 | 0 |
| Harrogate Town | 2022–23 | League Two | 19 | 0 | 0 | 0 | 0 | 0 | 2 | 0 | 21 | 0 |
| Harrogate Town | 2023–24 | League Two | 16 | 0 | 0 | 0 | 2 | 0 | 1 | 0 | 19 | 0 |
| Harrogate Town | 2024–25 | League Two | 2 | 0 | 0 | 0 | 0 | 0 | 3 | 0 | 5 | 0 |
| Harrogate Town | 2025–26 | League Two | 2 | 0 | 1 | 0 | 1 | 0 | 2 | 0 | 6 | 0 |
| Harrogate Town | Total | | 80 | 0 | 4 | 0 | 3 | 0 | 12 | 0 | 99 | 0 |
| Career total | | | 345 | 1 | 26 | 0 | 16 | 0 | 30 | 0 | 401 | 1 |

== Honours ==
Hibernian

- Scottish Cup: 2015–16
- Scottish League Cup runner-up: 2015–16

Individual

- Southend United Player of the Year: 2017–18
