= Conrad Logan =

Irish footballer (born 1986)

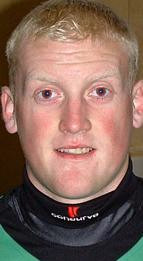

Personal information
- Full name: Conrad Joseph Logan
- Date of birth: 18 April 1986 (age 40)
- Place of birth: Letterkenny, Ireland
- Height: 1.88 m (6 ft 2 in)
- Position: Goalkeeper

Team information
- Current team: Anstey Nomads (manager)

Youth career
- 2000: Swilly Rovers
- 2001–2005: Leicester City

Senior career*
Years	Team	Apps	(Gls)
2005–2015	Leicester City	23	(0)
2005–2006	→ Boston United (loan)	10	(0)
2006	→ Boston United (loan)	3	(0)
2007–2008	→ Stockport County (loan)	34	(0)
2008–2009	→ Luton Town (loan)	22	(0)
2009	→ Stockport County (loan)	7	(0)
2011	→ Bristol Rovers (loan)	16	(0)
2011	→ Rotherham United (loan)	19	(0)
2014	→ Rochdale (loan)	19	(0)
2016	Hibernian	8	(0)
2016–2017	Rochdale	24	(0)
2017–2020	Mansfield Town	84	(0)
2020	→ Forest Green Rovers (loan)	5	(0)
2020–2021	Anstey Nomads	19	(0)
2021	Stamford	0	(0)
2021–2026	Anstey Nomads	186	(0)
Total		479	(0)

Managerial career
- 2025–: Anstey Nomads
- * Club domestic league appearances and goals

Conrad Joseph Logan (born 18 April 1986) is an Irish former professional footballer who played as a goalkeeper. He is currently manager of Northern Premier League Division One Midlands club Anstey Nomads.

Logan joined the Leicester City academy in 2001, making his professional debut in 2005. He largely served Leicester as a backup goalkeeper, playing for several other clubs on loan. During a loan spell at Stockport County, Logan helped the club win the 2008 Football League Two play-off final. At the time of his release in 2015, he was the longest-serving player in Leicester's squad.

After spending over a year out of the game, mainly due to injury, Logan signed for Scottish club Hibernian in March 2016. In his debut appearance for the club he made two saves in a penalty shootout earning them a place in the 2016 Scottish Cup Final, which they went on to win.

== Career ==
=== Leicester City ===
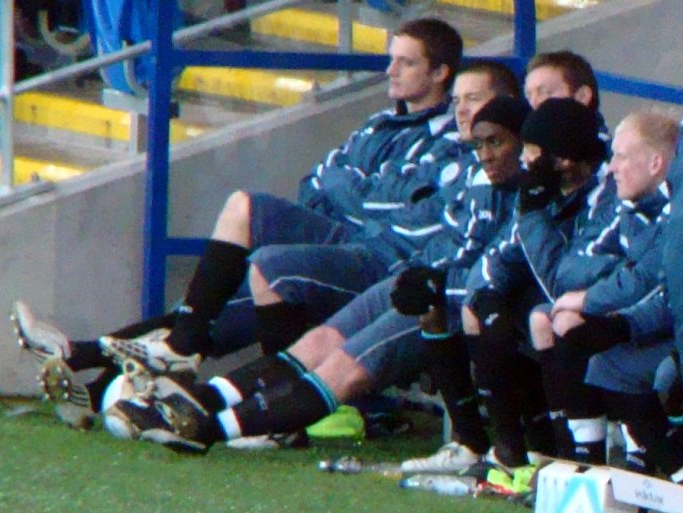
Logan (far right) as a substitute for Leicester City on 23 January 2010. He spent the majority of his career at the club on the bench.

Born in Ramelton, County Donegal, he began his career in 2001 in the youth system at Leicester City. He had two loan spells at Boston United during the 2005–06 season.

Logan, who made his senior debut for Leicester in a 2–0 League Cup win over Macclesfield Town on 22 August 2006. After a series of poor displays from first-choice keeper Paul Henderson at the start of the 2006–07 season, Logan made his league debut in a 0–0 draw against Colchester United on 23 September. He was dropped from the first team squad after conceding four goals against Sheffield Wednesday on 2 December 2006. Nonetheless, he signed a new three-year contract on 21 December. When Nigel Worthington was appointed caretaker manager, Logan regained his place in a 2–1 defeat to Norwich City on 14 April 2007. He played in the club's final five league games of the season, keeping two clean sheets and helping Leicester avoid relegation.

==== Stockport County (loan) ====
On 6 August 2007, Logan was made available for loan for the forthcoming season, and he signed a season-long loan with Stockport County on 9 August. In the 2007–08 season, Logan played 38 games for Stockport and helped the team to a League Two play-off final on 26 May where they met and defeated north-west rivals Rochdale 3–2.

==== Luton Town (loan) ====
Logan joined Luton Town on loan for six months in the 2008–09 season, providing competition for Luton goalkeeper Dean Brill. He saved three penalty kicks in a 0–0 FA Cup draw against Altrincham on 21 November 2008, which Luton won 4–2 on penalties. Logan helped the club to another penalty shootout win against Brentford in the Football League Trophy second round on 7 October 2008. His form prompted the club to make an offer for his loan to be extended by a further month. However, this was rejected by Logan's agent, and he missed out on the 2009 Football League Trophy Final against Scunthorpe United on 5 April 2009, which Luton won 3–2.

==== Stockport County (second loan) ====
On 27 March, Logan rejoined Stockport County on a one-week emergency loan as cover for injured keepers Owain Fôn Williams and Lloyd Rigby. He extended his stay with Stockport by a further week on 3 April, where the club's win against Crewe in the penultimate game guaranteed safety in League One.

=== Return to Leicester City ===
Despite a succession of loan moves, Logan refused to give up on his Leicester career and vowed to fight for his place in the 2009–10 season. Tim Flowers, who was previously coach at the club, felt that "to be fair to Conrad, he has also done well." Logan signed an extended contract with Leicester until the summer of 2012 on 16 February 2010. He finally played his first league game for the club since 2007 against Sheffield Wednesday at Hillsborough on 6 March 2010, conceding one goal in a 2–0 defeat after coming on as a substitute for the injured Chris Weale. After the game, Logan said he was still happy with life at the club. With Leicester already qualified for the Championship play-offs, Logan was finally given his first start against Middlesbrough on 2 May 2010, saving a penalty and keeping a clean sheet in a 2–0 win.

==== Bristol Rovers (loan) ====
Logan played seven games for Leicester in 2010–11 season, before on 18 February 2011, he joined Bristol Rovers on a one-month loan deal. Logan then extended his loan deal until the end of the season, after impressive displays, including two penalty saves in as many games against Huddersfield Town and Notts County. Towards the end of his 16 games at Bristol Logan expressed his desire to stay at Rovers permanently, a move that failed to materialise.

==== Rotherham United (loan) ====
On 5 August, Logan joined Rotherham United on loan until January 2012. Logan made his debut for the Millers in the 1–0 win over Oxford United on 7 August. At the end of his loan, Logan returned to Leicester amidst rumours about a permanent move away from the club.

=== Second return to Leicester City ===
On 29 June 2012, Logan signed a new deal extending his stay at the King Power Stadium until June 2013. Logan was an unused substitute in every one of Leicester's league and cup games that season and did not play a competitive match. Despite this, he was a regular for the club's Development Squad, captaining the side on many occasions as they won promotion to the newly formed Barclays Under 21 Premier League. At the end of May 2013, whilst publishing their release list of out of contract players, Leicester announced that negotiations were taking place for Logan to remain at the club for another season. On 13 June, Logan signed a new two-year contract until 2015. On 27 August 2013, he made his first appearance for Leicester City since October 2010, playing the full 90 minutes of the club's 5–2 League Cup win over Carlisle United.

==== Rochdale (loan) ====
On 18 August 2014, Logan joined League One side Rochdale on an initial one-month loan, following an injury to Josh Lillis. Logan made his debut in Rochdale's 5–2 victory at Crewe Alexandra, putting in an impressive display. On 28 August, Logan extended his loan at the club until January. Logan saved a penalty in Rochdale's 3–2 victory over Leyton Orient on 27 September, a feat he would replicate in the next game, saving Conor Hourihane's last minute penalty, although it could not prevent a 1–0 loss to Barnsley. On 20 December, Logan fell awkwardly during a match against Notts County and later had to be substituted. Following the match, manager Keith Hill confirmed that Logan had suffered a "serious" injury and Logan himself later tweeted that his loan spell had ended due to the injury. He made 24 appearances for Rochdale in all competitions.

=== Hibernian ===
Logan signed a short-term contract with Scottish club Hibernian in March 2016. In his first senior game for sixteen months, he was man of the match in Hibernian's Scottish Cup semi-final win against Dundee United. Logan made a series of saves during the match, which finished 0–0, then made two saves in the penalty shootout. Despite this performance, manager Alan Stubbs opted to restore regular goalkeeper Mark Oxley to the starting lineup for the following match. Logan regained the starting place before the promotion playoffs, in which Hibs lost to Falkirk 5–4 on aggregate. He then started the 2016 Scottish Cup Final, which Hibs won 3–2 against Rangers. Logan left Hibernian at the end of his contract after making eight appearances for the club.

=== Return to Rochdale ===
On 10 August 2016, Logan re-joined Rochdale on a six-month contract. He made 11 appearances in those six months prior to signing an extension until the end of the 2016–17 season.

=== Mansfield Town ===
Logan joined Mansfield Town on 10 May 2017. He was released by Mansfield at the end of the 2019–20 season.

==== Forest Green Rovers (loan) ====
On 24 January 2020, Logan joined Forest Green Rovers on loan until the end of the season.

=== Anstey Nomads, Stamford AFC and return to Anstey Nomads ===
In November 2020, Logan turned down offers from Football League clubs and joined United Counties League Premier Division club Anstey Nomads as a player and a coach with the club's junior team and a guide to the club's other coaches.

In January 2021, Logan signed for non-league side Stamford. However, he returned to Anstey Nomads six months later.

== International career ==
Logan was capped by the Republic of Ireland at youth international levels from under-14 to under-19.

== Coaching career ==
On 30 October 2025, Logan retired from playing, becoming first-team manager with Anstey Nomads.

== Career statistics ==
As of match played 12 May 2019

Appearances and goals by club, season and competition
Club	Season	League			FA Cup		League Cup		Other		Total	
Club	Season	Division	Apps	Goals	Apps	Goals	Apps	Goals	Apps	Goals	Apps	Goals
Leicester City	2005–06	Championship	0	0	0	0	0	0	0	0	0	0
Leicester City	2006–07	Championship	18	0	0	0	2	0	0	0	20	0
Leicester City	2007–08	Championship	0	0	0	0	0	0	0	0	0	0
Leicester City	2008–09	League One	0	0	0	0	0	0	0	0	0	0
Leicester City	2009–10	Championship	2	0	0	0	0	0	0	0	2	0
Leicester City	2010–11	Championship	3	0	0	0	4	0	0	0	7	0
Leicester City	2011–12	Championship	0	0	0	0	0	0	0	0	0	0
Leicester City	2012–13	Championship	0	0	0	0	0	0	0	0	0	0
Leicester City	2013–14	Championship	0	0	0	0	1	0	0	0	1	0
Leicester City	2014–15	Premier League	0	0	0	0	0	0	0	0	0	0
Leicester City	Total		23	0	0	0	7	0	0	0	30	0
Boston United (loan)	2005–06	League Two	13	0	0	0	0	0	0	0	13	0
Stockport County (loan)	2007–08	League Two	34	0	0	0	2	0	5	0	41	0
Luton Town (loan)	2008–09	League Two	22	0	3	0	1	0	4	0	30	0
Stockport County (loan)	2008–09	League One	7	0	0	0	0	0	0	0	7	0
Bristol Rovers (loan)	2010–11	League One	16	0	0	0	0	0	0	0	16	0
Rotherham United (loan)	2011–12	League Two	19	0	2	0	0	0	0	0	21	0
Rochdale (loan)	2014–15	League Two	19	0	4	0	0	0	2	0	25	0
Hibernian	2015–16	Scottish Championship	2	0	2	0	0	0	4	0	8	0
Rochdale	2016–17	League One	24	0	4	0	1	0	1	0	30	0
Mansfield Town	2017–18	League Two	45	0	4	0	0	0	0	0	49	0
Mansfield Town	2018–19	League Two	17	0	0	0	0	0	6	0	23	0
Mansfield Town	Total		62	0	4	0	0	0	6	0	66	0
Career total			241	0	19	0	11	0	22	0	293	0

== Honours ==
Stockport County

- Football League Two play-offs: 2008

Hibernian

- Scottish Cup: 2015–16
