= Darren McGregor =

Scottish footballer (born 1985)

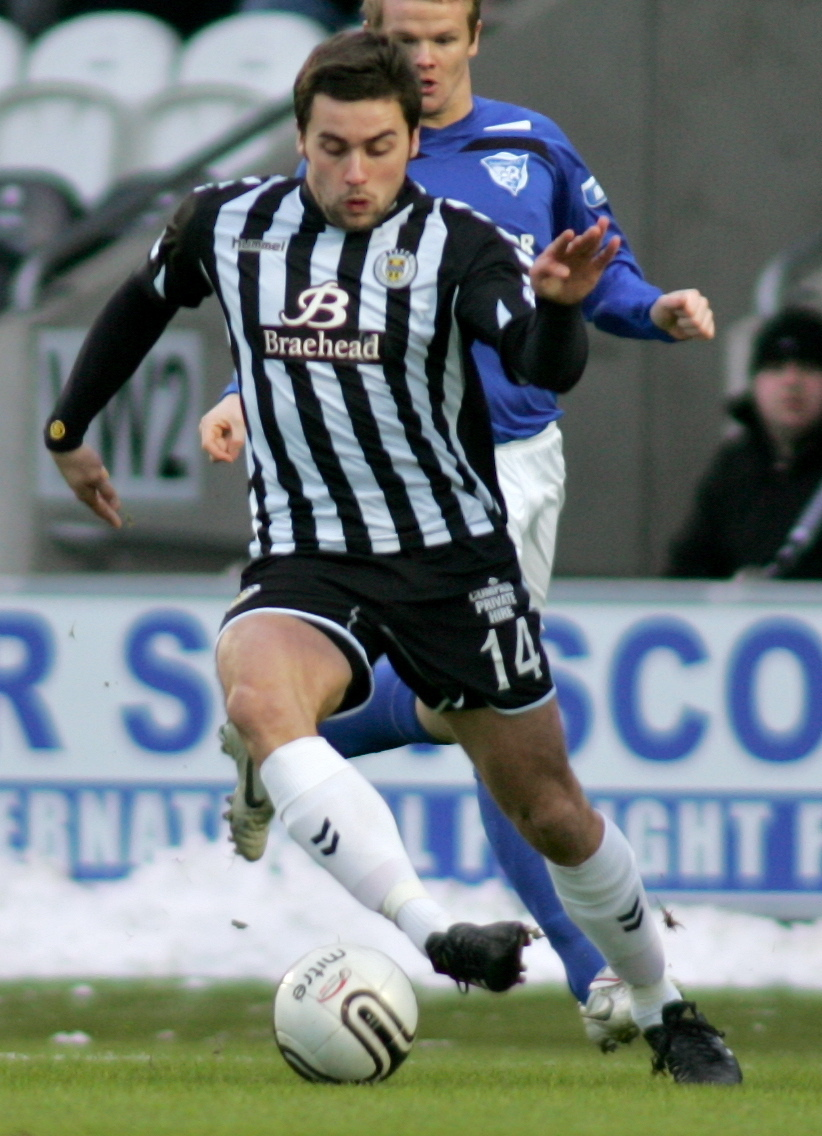
- McGregor playing for St Mirren in 2011

Personal information
- Full name: Darren McGregor
- Date of birth: 7 August 1985 (age 41)
- Place of birth: Edinburgh, Scotland
- Height: 6 ft 0 in (1.83 m)
- Position: Defender

Team information
- Current team: Hibernian (coach)

Senior career*
Years	Team	Apps	(Gls)
2004–2006	Cowdenbeath	31	(1)
2006–2008	Arniston Rangers		
2008–2010	Cowdenbeath	51	(6)
2010–2014	St Mirren	83	(4)
2014–2015	Rangers	36	(4)
2015–2023	Hibernian	138	(5)
Total		339	(20)
- * Club domestic league appearances and goals

Darren McGregor (born 7 August 1985) is a Scottish football coach and former player, who is a coach at Scottish Premiership club Hibernian.

McGregor has had two spells with Cowdenbeath during his career. In his first spell he made his professional debut before being released and then plying his trade in junior football with Arniston Rangers in Midlothian. McGregor returned to Cowdenbeath in 2008.

He then played with St Mirren for four years, during when he suffered two serious knee injuries. After one season with Rangers, McGregor signed for Hibernian in 2015. He helped them win the Scottish Cup in 2016 and promotion in 2016–17.

== Career ==
=== Cowdenbeath ===
His senior career started with Cowdenbeath, where he played a role in the side that won the 2005–06 Scottish Third Division championship. McGregor was released at the end of that season and spent two years in junior football, before returning to Cowdenbeath at the start of the 2008–09 season. He played an important role over the next two seasons as the team were promoted to the Scottish First Division.

=== St Mirren ===
On 15 June 2010, McGregor followed ex-Cowdenbeath manager Danny Lennon to St Mirren, joining the side on a two-year contract. He made his SPL debut on 14 August 2010 in a 1–1 draw with Dundee United and scored his first goal for the club in a Scottish League Cup game against Ross County on 25 August 2010.

He scored his first league goal for the club in a 1–1 draw at St Mirren Park against Dundee United on 26 January 2011, netting a header from a well placed corner kick by Steven Thomson. He then scored his second league goal for the club in a 3–3 draw against Inverness Caledonian Thistle on 12 February 2011, with a header from a Jure Travner corner. During a match against Dundee United in the SPL on 6 August 2011, McGregor suffered cruciate ligament damage that prevented him from playing for most of the 2011–12 season.

On 24 February 2012, it was announced that McGregor had signed a two-year contract extension, tying him to the club until the summer of 2014. McGregor returned to the St Mirren first team, but then suffered another cruciate ligament injury in a match against Hibernian on 18 August 2012. The injury sidelined McGregor for the rest of the 2012–13 Scottish Premier League season, and meant that he had only played 12 competitive matches for the club in a two-season period.

During pre-season of season 2013–14, McGregor returned to action after recovering from his second cruciate ligament injury, and admitted that he feared he may never play football again. McGregor had an injury free season and registered 35 league appearances for the club.

=== Rangers ===
McGregor signed a one-year deal on 11 June 2014 with Rangers with an option for a second year. He made his debut for Rangers when he came on as a 92nd-minute substitute for Richard Foster in the opening game of the Scottish Championship season against Hearts. He scored his first goal for Rangers in a 4–1 win over Dumbarton in August 2014. In May 2015, McGregor won the Rangers' Player of the Year and Manager's Player of the Year. On 24 August 2015, it was announced that McGregor and Rangers had terminated his contract by mutual consent.

=== Hibernian ===
On 25 August 2015, the day after his release by Rangers, McGregor joined boyhood club Hibernian on a two-year deal. McGregor was part of the Hibs team that won the 2015–16 Scottish Cup, winning 3–2 against his former club Rangers in the final.

On 15 April 2017, McGregor scored twice as Hibs beat Queen of the South 3–0 to clinch the 2016–17 Scottish Championship title and a return to the Scottish Premiership after an absence of three years. He signed a two-year contract with Hibs in May 2017. McGregor underwent knee surgery in September 2017, which head coach Neil Lennon said would prevent him from playing for at least four weeks.

In April 2019, Hibs and McGregor agreed a new contract that is due to run until 2023. In August of that year he sustained a lower abdominal injury which kept him out of action for four months. Having made four appearances that season prior to the injury, he made six more after returning (and remained an unused substitute on 15 further occasions) before the campaign was curtailed due to the COVID-19 pandemic in Scotland.

On 15 May 2022, in the last match of the 2021–22 season, McGregor captained Hibs to a 4–0 win against St Johnstone. In June 2022 it was announced that McGregor would take up a player/coach role with the Hibs development squad. He retired from playing at the end of the 2022–23 season (in which he was an unused substitute for 13 league fixtures), and became head coach of the Hibs under-18 team.

McGregor was awarded a testimonial match by Hibs in 2025, but was unable to play after undergoing surgery for an injury suffered in a car crash.

== Career statistics ==
As of 16:32, 27 May 2023 (UTC)

Appearances and goals by club, season and competition
Club	Season	League			National Cup		League Cup		Other		Total	
Club	Season	Divisions	Apps	Goals	Apps	Goals	Apps	Goals	Apps	Goals	Apps	Goals
Cowdenbeath	2004–05	Scottish Third Division	17	1	0	0	1	0	0	0	18	1
Cowdenbeath	2005–06	Scottish Third Division	14	0	1	0	1	0	1 (Note: Appearances in the Scottish Challenge Cup)	0	17	0
Cowdenbeath	Total		31	1	1	0	2	0	1	0	35	1
Arniston Rangers	2006–07	SJFA East Region	—		—		—		—		—	
Arniston Rangers	2007–08	SJFA East Region	—		—		—		—		—	
Arniston Rangers	Total		—		—		—		—		—	
Cowdenbeath	2008–09	Scottish Third Division	34	1	1	0	2	1	6 (Note: Three appearances and one goal in the Scottish Challenge Cup and three appearances in the Scottish Second Division play-offs)	1	43	3
Cowdenbeath	2009–10	Scottish Second Division	17	5	0	0	0	0	4 (Note: Appearances in the Scottish First Division play-offs)	0	21	5
Cowdenbeath	Total		51	6	1	0	2	1	10	1	64	8
St Mirren	2010–11	Scottish Premier League	36	3	5	0	1	1	—		42	4
St Mirren	2011–12	Scottish Premier League	9	0	0	0	0	0	—		9	0
St Mirren	2012–13	Scottish Premier League	3	1	0	0	0	0	—		3	1
St Mirren	2013–14	Scottish Premiership	35	0	3	0	0	0	—		38	0
St Mirren	Total		83	4	8	0	1	1	0	0	92	5
Rangers	2014–15	Scottish Championship	36	4	3	0	5	0	9 (Note: Four appearances in the Scottish Challenge Cup and five appearances and one goal in the Scottish Premiership play-offs)	1	53	5
Hibernian	2015–16	Scottish Championship	28	0	7	1	5	0	4 (Note: Appearances in the Scottish Premiership play-offs)	2	44	3
Hibernian	2016–17 (Note: Soccerbase did not record two appearances made by McGregor against Brondby IF on 14 July and 21 July 2016.)	Scottish Championship	35	2	4	0	1	0	3 (Note: One appearance in the Scottish Challenge Cup and two appearances in the UEFA Europa League)	0	43	2
Hibernian	2017–18	Scottish Premiership	24	0	1	0	4	0	—		29	0
Hibernian	2018–19 (Note: Soccerbase did not record appearances made by McGregor against Asteras Tripolis on 26 July and 2 August 2018.)	Scottish Premiership	24	2	3	0	0	0	3 (Note: Appearances in the UEFA Europa League)	0	30	2
Hibernian	2019–20	Scottish Premiership	6	0	1	0	3	0	—		10	0
Hibernian	2020–21	Scottish Premiership	10	1	1	0	5	0	—		16	1
Hibernian	2021–22	Scottish Premiership	10	0	1	0	2	0	2 (Note: Appearances in the UEFA Conference League)	0	15	0
Hibernian	Total		138	5	18	1	20	0	12	2	188	8
Career total			339	20	31	1	30	2	32	3	432	26

== Honours ==
Cowdenbeath

- Scottish Football League Third Division: 2005–06

Hibernian

- Scottish Cup: 2015–16
- Scottish Championship: 2016–17
