= 2016 Scottish Cup final =

2016 Scottish Cup Final
- Official programme cover
- Event: 2015–16 Scottish Cup
Rangers	Hibernian
2	3
- Date: 21 May 2016
- Venue: Hampden Park, Glasgow
- Man of the Match: Anthony Stokes (Hibernian)
- Referee: Steven McLean
- Attendance: 50,701

The 2016 Scottish Cup Final was the 131st final of the Scottish Cup and the final of the 2015–16 Scottish Cup, the most prestigious knockout football competition in Scotland. The match took place at Hampden Park on 21 May 2016 and was contested by Scottish Championship teams Rangers and Hibernian. It was the first final to be contested by two teams from outside the top tier of the Scottish football league system. Hibernian ended a run of 114 years from last winning the competition, beating Rangers 3–2 with a stoppage time goal from club captain David Gray.

The winners, Hibernian, entered the second qualifying round of the 2016–17 UEFA Europa League.

== Route to the final ==
=== Hibernian ===
Hibernian started the Scottish Cup in the fourth round as one of the top four placed teams in the 2014–15 Scottish Championship. They were drawn away at fellow Championship team Raith Rovers. At Stark's Park, Hibernian won 2–0 with goals from Darren McGregor and Dominique Malonga. In the fifth round, they were drawn away against their Edinburgh derby rivals and Premiership club, Heart of Midlothian. Following a 2–2 draw at Tynecastle Stadium, Hibernian won the replay at their Easter Road 1–0 via a Jason Cummings goal. In the quarter finals they were drawn at home against the Scottish Cup holders, Premiership side Inverness Caledonian Thistle. Following a 1–1 draw, Hibernian won the replay at Caledonian Stadium 2–1 due to two goals from Anthony Stokes. In the semi-final at neutral Hampden Park, they were drawn against Premiership Dundee United and progressed to the final after winning 4–2 in a penalty shoot out.

Round	Opposition	Location	Score
Rangers
Fourth round	Cowdenbeath	Ibrox	5–1
Fifth round	Kilmarnock	Ibrox	0–0
Fifth round replay	Kilmarnock	Rugby Park	2–1
Quarter-final	Dundee	Ibrox	4–0
Semi-final	Celtic	Hampden Park	2–2 (a.e.t.) (5–4 pen.)
Hibernian
Fourth round	Raith Rovers	Stark's Park	2–0
Fifth round	Hearts	Tynecastle	2–2
Fifth round replay	Hearts	Easter Road	1–0
Quarter-final	Inverness Caledonian Thistle	Easter Road	1–1
Quarter-final replay	Inverness Caledonian Thistle	Caledonian Stadium	2–1
Semi-final	Dundee United	Hampden Park	0–0 (a.e.t.) (4–2 pen.)

=== Rangers ===
Rangers also started the Scottish Cup in the fourth round as one of the top four placed teams in the previous years Scottish Championship. In the fourth round they were drawn against Scottish League One team Cowdenbeath at home. At their Ibrox Stadium, Rangers won 5–1 with goals from Lee Wallace, Barrie McKay and a hat-trick from Martyn Waghorn. In the next round they were drawn with Premiership team Kilmarnock. After a 0–0 draw at Ibrox Stadium, Rangers won 2–1 in the replay at Rugby Park with goals from Waghorn and Nicky Clark. In the quarter finals, Rangers were drawn at home against Premiership Dundee, which they won 4–0 with goals from Harry Forrester, Jason Holt, Andy Halliday and Wallace. In the semi-finals, Rangers were drawn against their Old Firm rivals Celtic in only their second meeting since 2012. Rangers progressed to the final winning 5–4 on penalties at the end of a 2–2 draw after extra time. Rangers entered the final as Scottish Championship winners and Scottish Challenge Cup winners.

== Pre-match ==
The 2016 final marked Hibernian's third appearance in the final in the space of five years, having lost to Hearts in 2012 and Celtic in 2013. These were the most recent of ten finals lost since their last victory in 1902, with the run of 114 years without a repeat being a national record (prior to this, they had also won in 1887 and lost in 1896).

Rangers had played in 51 previous Scottish Cup finals, with 33 wins in the competition. The most recent appearance and victory for Rangers was in 2009, when they defeated Falkirk 1–0. This was the first meeting of the clubs in the Scottish Cup since 2008, when Rangers won 1–0 at Ibrox in a replay after a goalless draw at Easter Road. Hibernian and Rangers had previously met in one Scottish Cup Final, in 1979. Rangers won the cup that year by winning a second replay by 3–2, after the first two matches both finished goalless.

== Match ==
=== Details ===
21 May 2016
15:00

Rangers	2–3	Hibernian
Miller 27'; Halliday 64'	Report	Stokes 3', 80'; Gray 90+2'

Hampden Park, Glasgow
Attendance: 50,701
Referee: Steven McLean

Rangers	Hibernian

GK	25	(England) Wes Foderingham
DF	2	(England) James Tavernier	(c) (yellow card) 56'
DF	4	(Republic of Ireland) Rob Kiernan
DF	27	(Scotland) Danny Wilson
DF	5	(Scotland) Lee Wallace
MF	8	(United States) Gedion Zelalem		(substituted off) 63'
MF	16	(Scotland) Andy Halliday
MF	23	(Scotland) Jason Holt
MF	19	(Scotland) Barrie McKay
FW	33	(England) Martyn Waghorn		(substituted off) 75'
FW	9	(Scotland) Kenny Miller
Substitutes:
GK	1	(Scotland) Cammy Bell
MF	7	(England) Nicky Law
MF	14	(Scotland) Nicky Clark		(substituted on) 75'
MF	22	(Northern Ireland) Dean Shiels		(substituted on) 63'
MF	62	(Scotland) Liam Burt
Manager:
(England) Mark Warburton

GK	25	(Republic of Ireland) Conrad Logan
DF	2	(Scotland) David Gray (c)
DF	24	(Scotland) Darren McGregor
DF	4	(Scotland) Paul Hanlon		(substituted off) 83'
DF	5	(England) Liam Fontaine		(substituted off) 70'
DF	16	(Scotland) Lewis Stevenson
MF	8	(Scotland) Fraser Fyvie	(yellow card) 59'
MF	10	(Scotland) Dylan McGeouch
MF	18	(Scotland) John McGinn
FW	28	(Republic of Ireland) Anthony Stokes
FW	35	(Scotland) Jason Cummings		(substituted off) 65'
Substitutes:
GK	1	(England) Mark Oxley
MF	3	(Scotland) Liam Henderson		(substituted on) 70'
MF	6	(England) Marvin Bartley
MF	17	(Australia) Martin Boyle
FW	19	(Scotland) James Keatings		(substituted on) 65'
DF	27	(Norway) Niklas Gunnarsson		(substituted on) 83'
FW	29	(England) Chris Dagnall
Manager:
(England) Alan Stubbs

Match rules

- 90 minutes
- 30 minutes of extra time if necessary
- Penalty shoot-out if scores still level
- Seven named substitutes
- Maximum of three substitutions

== Post-match ==
At the end of the match, thousands of Hibernian fans spilled out onto the pitch in celebration. An element headed to the other end of the ground to goad Rangers fans, who responded by entering the pitch themselves, leading to fights. Some Rangers players and staff were assaulted by the Hibernian fans as they tried to leave the pitch. The Rangers team received their runners-up medals in the dressing room. The SFA conducted a full investigation into the crowd trouble. The report was published in August and found that neither club was to blame but that the invasion was caused by the Hibs supporters' exuberance at winning the cup. It was pointed out that Rangers supporters had let off fireworks and sung sectarian songs during the match.

The report suggested the possibility of making pitch invasions illegal as they are in England. The aftermath of the final is also notable for the five-minute rendition by Hibs' fans, having returned to the stands, of the club's anthem, the Proclaimers' "Sunshine on Leith".
