= 2015–16 Raith Rovers F.C. season =

Raith Rovers
2015–16 season
- Chairman: Alan Young
- Manager: Ray McKinnon
- Stadium: Stark's Park
- Championship: 4th
- Challenge Cup: 2nd Round (lost to Stenhousemuir)
- League Cup: 3rd Round (lost to Celtic)
- Scottish Cup: 4th Round (lost to Hibernian)
- Highest home attendance: 6,943 (v Rangers, 2 April 2016)
- Lowest home attendance: 1,064 (v Alloa Athletic, 12 January 2016)
- Average home league attendance: 2,317
Home colours	Away colours	Third colours

The 2015–16 season was Raith Rovers' seventh consecutive season in the second tier of Scottish football having been promoted from the Scottish Second Division at the end of the 2008–09 season. Raith Rovers also competed in the Challenge Cup, League Cup and the Scottish Cup.

== Summary ==
=== Management ===
Raith were led by manager Ray McKinnon for the 2015–16 season for his 1st season at the club.

== Results & fixtures ==
Win Draw Loss Postponed

=== Pre-season ===
4 July 2015 Friendly	Raith Rovers	P–P	Brechin City	Stark's Park
15:00
Note: Postponed due to a waterlogged pitch

7 July 2015 Friendly	Raith Rovers	0 – 2	Heart of Midlothian	Stark's Park
19:45		Raith Report	Oliver 54'; Walker 78'	Attendance: 1,983; Referee: Crawford Allan

12 July 2015 Friendly	Raith Rovers	0 – 2	Aberdeen	Stark's Park
13:00		Raith Report	Goodwillie 64'; Taylor 69'	Attendance: 1,359; Referee: Craig Charleston

15 July 2015 Friendly	Raith Rovers	1 – 2	Dundee	Stark's Park
19:45	Anderson 51'	Raith Report	Hemmings 22'; Etxabeguren 47'	Referee: John McKendrick

18 July 2015 Friendly	East Fife	2 – 0	Raith Rovers	Bayview Stadium
15:00	Smith 86'; Page 90'	Raith Report		Referee: George Salmond

21 July 2015 Friendly	Raith Rovers	1 – 1	Celtic XI	Stark's Park
19:45	Anderson 12'	Raith Report	Thomson 59'	Attendance: 955; Referee: Willie Collum

=== Scottish Championship ===
8 August 2015 Championship	Raith Rovers	3 – 0	Livingston	Stark's Park
15:00	Stewart 8'; McCord 35' (pen.); Megginson 90'	Raith Report		Attendance: 1,560; Referee: Mat Northcroft

15 August 2015 Championship	Falkirk	1 – 0	Raith Rovers	Falkirk Stadium
15:00	Kerr 80'	Raith Report	Benedictus (yellow card) 71' (red card)	Attendance: 3,753; Referee: Stephen Finnie

22 August 2015 Championship	Raith Rovers	3 – 0	Alloa Athletic	Stark's Park
15:00	Craigen 55'; Wighton 60'; Stewart 84'	Raith Report		Attendance: 1,458; Referee: Kevin Graham

29 August 2015 Championship	Hibernian	2 – 0	Raith Rovers	Easter Road
15:00	Keatings 22'; Cummings 50'	Raith Report		Attendance: 8,484; Referee: Alan Muir

5 September 2015 Championship	Rangers	5 – 0	Raith Rovers	Ibrox Stadium
15:00	Wallace 4'; Tavernier 45'; McKay 55'; Waghorn 64' (pen.), 69' (pen.)	Raith Report		Attendance: 44,050; Referee: Brian Colvin

12 September 2015 Championship	Raith Rovers	1 – 0	Queen of the South	Stark's Park
15:00	Benedictus 78'	Raith Report		Attendance: 1,527; Referee: Kevin Clancy

18 September 2015 Championship	St Mirren	1 – 2	Raith Rovers	St Mirren Park
19:45	Shankland 45'	Raith Report	Craigen 12'; Anderson 87'	Attendance: 2,877; Referee: Euan Anderson

26 September 2015 Championship	Raith Rovers	1 – 0	Dumbarton	Stark's Park
15:00	Toshney 56'	Raith Report		Attendance: 1,440; Referee: Barry Cook

3 October 2015 Championship	Raith Rovers	2 – 1	Greenock Morton	Stark's Park
15:00	Stewart 45'; Thomson 90'	Raith Report	O'Ware 82'	Attendance: 1,754; Referee: Bobby Madden

17 October 2015 Championship	Alloa Athletic	0 – 1	Raith Rovers	Recreation Park
15:00		Raith Report	Anderson 79'	Attendance: 808; Referee: Andrew Dallas

24 October 2015 Championship	Raith Rovers	1 – 2	Hibernian	Stark's Park
15:00	Daly 64'	Raith Report	McGinn 4'; Cummings 26'	Attendance: 4,114; Referee: George Salmond

31 October 2015 Championship	Livingston	3 – 0	Raith Rovers	Tony Macaroni Arena
15:00	White 6', 64'; Gallagher 61'	Raith Report		Attendance: 957; Referee: Crawford Allan

7 November 2015 Championship	Raith Rovers	1 – 2	Falkirk	Stark's Park
15:00	Stewart 39'	Raith Report	Alston 42'; Baird 60'	Attendance: 2,160; Referee: Nick Walsh

21 November 2015 Championship	Dumbarton	3 – 3	Raith Rovers	Dumbarton Football Stadium
15:00	Saunders 81', 83'; Fleming 87' (pen.)	Raith Report	Craigen 4'; Stewart 44'; S.Robertson 56'	Attendance: 707; Referee: Greg Aitken

24 November 2015 Championship	Raith Rovers	1 – 1	St Mirren	Stark's Park
19:45	Stewart 39'	Raith Report	Mallan 88'	Attendance: 1,264; Referee: John McKendrick

11 December 2015 Championship	Queen of the South	1 – 1	Raith Rovers	Palmerston Park
19:45	Russell 48'	Raith Report	Thomson 22' (o.g.)	Attendance: 1,047; Referee: Craig Charleston

18 December 2015 Championship	Greenock Morton	1 – 2	Raith Rovers	Cappielow
19:45	Samuel 23'	Raith Report	Callachan 48'; Craigen 90' (pen.)	Attendance: 1,264; Referee: John McKendrick

2 January 2016 Championship	Hibernian	1 – 0	Raith Rovers	Easter Road
15:00	Cummings 50'	Raith Report	Anderson (yellow card) 90' (red card)	Attendance: 10,994; Referee: George Salmond

12 January 2016 Championship	Raith Rovers	0 – 1	Alloa Athletic	Stark's Park
19:45		Raith Report	Flannigan 86' (pen.)	Attendance: 1,064; Referee: Greg Aitken

23 January 2016 Championship	Raith Rovers	0 – 0	Dumbarton	Stark's Park
15:00		Raith Report		Attendance: 1,397; Referee: Stephen Finnie

2 February 2016 Championship	Raith Rovers	0 – 1	Rangers	Stark's Park
19:45		Raith Report	Halliday 44'	Attendance: 5,493; Referee: Euan Anderson

13 February 2016 Championship	Falkirk	2 – 2	Raith Rovers	Falkirk Stadium
15:00	Alston 14'; McCracken 20'	Raith Report	Craigen 16'	Attendance: 3,956; Referee: John Beaton

20 February 2016 Championship	Raith Rovers	2 – 0	Livingston	Stark's Park
15:00	Stewart 37'; Connolly 48'	Raith Report		Attendance: 1,617; Referee: Willie Collum

27 February 2016 Championship	Raith Rovers	3 – 2	Greenock Morton	Stark's Park
15:00	McKeown 7'; Connolly 74'; Hardie 89'	Raith Report	McManus 73', 87'	Attendance: 1,633; Referee: Mat Northcroft

1 March 2016 Championship	Rangers	2 – 0	Raith Rovers	Ibrox Stadium
19:45	Forrester 27'; Wallace 51'	Raith Report		Attendance: 40,662; Referee: Craig Charleston

5 March 2016 Championship	Raith Rovers	4 – 3	St Mirren	Stark's Park
15:00	Hardie 3', 53', 55'; Stewart 24'	Raith Report	Watson 41', 76'; Clarkson 61'	Attendance: 1,888; Referee: John Beaton

8 March 2016 Championship	Raith Rovers	2 – 0	Queen of the South	Stark's Park
19:45	Stewart 32'; Craigen 44' (pen.)	Raith Report		Attendance: 1,398; Referee: Nick Walsh

12 March 2016 Championship	Alloa Athletic	1 – 1	Raith Rovers	Recreation Park
15:00	Hetherington 64'	Raith Report	Benedictus 90'	Attendance: 762; Referee: George Salmond

19 March 2016 Championship	Raith Rovers	2 – 1	Hibernian	Stark's Park
17:15	Toshney 38'; Stewart 53'	Raith Report	Stokes 25'	Attendance: 2,386; Referee: John McKendrick

22 March 2016 Championship	St Mirren	1 – 2	Raith Rovers	St Mirren Park
19:45	Cooper 43'	Raith Report	Connolly 22'; Callachan 36'	Attendance: 2,381; Referee: Barry Cook

26 March 2016 Championship	Greenock Morton	0 – 1	Raith Rovers	Cappielow
15:00		Raith Report	Craigen 53'	Attendance: 1,778; Referee: Stephen Finnie

2 April 2016 Championship	Raith Rovers	3 – 3	Rangers	Stark's Park
15:00	Longridge 25'; Craigen 38'; Panayiotou 90'	Raith Report	Forrester 30'; O'Halloran 35'; Miller 49'	Attendance: 6,943; Referee: Euan Anderson

9 April 2016 Championship	Queen of the South	1 – 2	Raith Rovers	Palmerston Park
15:00	Hilson 53'	Raith Report	Benedictus 8'; Barr 63'	Attendance: 1,511; Referee: Kevin Clancy

16 April 2016 Championship	Dumbarton	2 – 3	Raith Rovers	Dumbarton Football Stadium
17:15	Nadé 12'; Saunders 90'	Raith Report	Hardie 49'; Connolly 60'; Craigen 70'	Attendance: 655; Referee: Nick Walsh

23 April 2016 Championship	Raith Rovers	2 – 2	Falkirk	Stark's Park
17:15	Thomas 7'; Hardie 70'	Raith Report	Sibbald 56'; McHugh 88'	Attendance: 2,602; Referee: Bobby Madden

1 May 2016 Championship	Livingston	0 – 1	Raith Rovers	Almondvale Stadium
12:30		Raith Report	Connolly 50'	Attendance: 1,049; Referee: Craig Charleston

=== Scottish Premiership play-offs ===
4 May 2016 Premiership Play-Off Quarter-Final 1st Leg	Raith Rovers	1 – 0	Hibernian	Stark's Park
19:45	Panayiotou 75'	Raith Report		Attendance: 5,330; Referee: Kevin Clancy

7 May 2016 Premiership Play-Off Quarter-Final 2nd Leg	Hibernian	2 – 0	Raith Rovers	Easter Road
12:30	McGinn 8'; McGregor 12'	Raith Report		Attendance: 11,133; Referee: John McKendrick

=== Scottish Challenge Cup ===
25 July 2015 Round 1	Cowdenbeath	0 – 1	Raith Rovers	Central Park
15:00		Raith Report	Vaughan 23'	Attendance: 711; Referee: Kevin Clancy

18 August 2015 Round 2	Stenhousemuir	2 – 0	Raith Rovers	Ochilview Park
19:45	Cook 67'; Stirling 71'	Raith Report	Thomson (red card) 90'	Attendance: 449; Referee: Greg Aitken

=== Scottish League Cup ===
1 August 2015 Round 1	Raith Rovers	3 – 0	Albion Rovers	Stark's Park
15:00	Vaughan 16' (pen.); Benedictus 38'; McKeown 54'	Raith Report		Attendance: 1,163; Referee: Nick Walsh

25 August 2015 Round 2	Raith Rovers	2 – 1	Hamilton Academical	Stark's Park
19:45	Davidson 3'; Benedictus 81'	Raith Report	Nadé 66'	Attendance: 1,470; Referee: Don Robertson

23 September 2015 Round 3	Celtic	2 – 0	Raith Rovers	Celtic Park
19:45	Commons 32'; Johansen 87'	Raith Report		Attendance: 13,591; Referee: John McKendrick

=== Scottish Cup ===
28 November 2015 Round 3	Elgin City	1 – 2	Raith Rovers	Borough Briggs
15:00	Halsman 90'	Raith Report	McCord 39' (pen.); Anderson 54'	Attendance: 853; Referee: George Salmond

9 January 2016 Round 4	Raith Rovers	0 – 2	Hibernian	Stark's Park
15:00		Raith Report	McGregor 61'; Malonga 64'	Attendance: 5,203; Referee: Willie Collum

== Player statistics ==
=== Squad ===
Last updated 7 May 2016

No.	Pos	Nat	Player	Total		Championship		Challenge Cup		League Cup		Scottish Cup		Premiership play-offs	
No.	Pos	Nat	Player	Apps	Goals	Apps	Goals	Apps	Goals	Apps	Goals	Apps	Goals	Apps	Goals
1	GK	(Scotland) SCO	Kevin Cuthbert	45	0	36+0	0	2+0	0	3+0	0	2+0	0	2+0	0
2	DF	(Scotland) SCO	Jason Thomson	33	1	25+1	1	2+0	0	3+0	0	0+0	0	2+0	0
3	MF	(Scotland) SCO	Darren Petrie	6	0	2+2	0	1+0	0	1+0	0	0+0	0	0+0	0
4	MF	(Scotland) SCO	Ross Callachan	32	2	21+4	2	1+1	0	1+0	0	1+1	0	2+0	0
5	DF	(Scotland) SCO	Lewis Toshney	36	2	31+0	2	1+0	0	2+0	0	0+0	0	2+0	0
6	DF	(Scotland) SCO	Kyle Benedictus	38	5	30+0	3	1+0	0	3+0	2	2+0	0	2+0	0
7	MF	(Scotland) SCO	Grant Anderson	32	3	14+12	2	2+0	0	3+0	0	1+0	1	0+0	0
8	MF	(Scotland) SCO	Ryan McCord	26	2	17+2	1	2+0	0	2+1	0	1+1	1	0+0	0
9	FW	(Scotland) SCO	Mark Stewart	37	8	26+3	8	1+1	0	3+0	0	1+0	0	0+2	0
10	MF	(Scotland) SCO	Lewis Vaughan	2	2	0+0	0	1+0	1	1+0	1	0+0	0	0+0	0
11 (until January 2016)	FW	(Scotland) SCO	Mitchel Megginson	21	1	4+12	1	1+0	0	2+1	0	1+0	0	0+0	0
11 (from January 2016)	FW	(Saint Kitts and Nevis) SKN	Harry Panayiotou	16	2	8+6	1	0+0	0	0+0	0	0+0	0	0+2	1
12	MF	(Scotland) SCO	Ross Matthews	18	0	4+10	0	1+0	0	1+0	0	1+1	0	0+0	0
14	MF	(Scotland) SCO	Iain Davidson	36	1	27+2	0	1+0	0	2+0	1	2+0	0	2+0	0
15	FW	(France) FRA	Joël Thomas	9	1	2+6	1	0+0	0	0+0	0	0+0	0	0+1	0
16 (until January 2016)	FW	(Republic of Ireland) IRL	Jon Daly	19	1	13+2	1	0+0	0	0+2	0	2+0	0	0+0	0
16 (from February 2016)	FW	(Scotland) SCO	Ryan Hardie	12	6	7+3	6	0+0	0	0+0	0	0+0	0	2+0	0
17	GK	(Scotland) SCO	Ross Laidlaw	0	0	0+0	0	0+0	0	0+0	0	0+0	0	0+0	0
18 (from January 2016)	FW	(Scotland) SCO	Aidan Connolly	17	5	13+3	5	0+0	0	0+0	0	0+0	0	1+0	0
18 (until January 2016)	FW	(Scotland) SCO	Craig Wighton	21	1	7+9	1	1+1	0	2+1	0	0+0	0	0+0	0
20	GK	(Scotland) SCO	David McGurn	0	0	0+0	0	0+0	0	0+0	0	0+0	0	0+0	0
21 (from January 2016)	FW	(Scotland) SCO	Louis Longridge	15	1	9+4	1	0+0	0	0+0	0	0+0	0	1+1	0
21 (until January 2016)	FW	(Scotland) SCO	Callum Robertson	0	0	0+0	0	0+0	0	0+0	0	0+0	0	0+0	0
22	DF	(Scotland) SCO	David Bates	15	0	7+3	0	2+0	0	1+0	0	2+0	0	0+0	0
23	DF	(Northern Ireland) NIR	Rory McKeown	44	2	36+0	1	1+0	0	3+0	1	2+0	0	2+0	0
24	DF	(Scotland) SCO	Laurie Ellis	0	0	0+0	0	0+0	0	0+0	0	0+0	0	0+0	0
25	DF	(Scotland) SCO	Elliot Ford	1	0	0+0	0	0+1	0	0+0	0	0+0	0	0+0	0
26	FW	(Scotland) SCO	Jonny Court	1	0	0+1	0	0+0	0	0+0	0	0+0	0	0+0	0
27	MF	(Scotland) SCO	Kieran Campbell	1	0	0+1	0	0+0	0	0+0	0	0+0	0	0+0	0
28	MF	(England) ENG	James Craigen	42	9	31+3	9	1+0	0	2+1	0	2+0	0	2+0	0
29	DF	(Scotland) SCO	Sean Mackie	1	0	0+1	0	0+0	0	0+0	0	0+0	0	0+0	0
30	MF	(Scotland) SCO	Scott Robertson	21	1	17+2	1	0+0	0	0+0	0	2+0	0	0+0	0
31	GK	(Scotland) SCO	Scott Law	0	0	0+0	0	0+0	0	0+0	0	0+0	0	0+0	0
55	DF	(Scotland) SCO	Craig Barr	14	1	11+1	1	0+0	0	0+0	0	0+0	0	2+0	0
--	DF	(Scotland) SCO	David McKay	0	0	0+0	0	0+0	0	0+0	0	0+0	0	0+0	0

=== Top Goalscorer ===
Includes all competitive matches

Ranking	Nation	Number	Name	Total
1	(Scotland)			

=== Disciplinary record ===
Includes all competitive matches.

Last updated May 2016

Nation	Position	Name	Championship		Challenge Cup		League Cup		Scottish Cup		Premiership Play-offs		Total	
Nation	Position	Name	Booked	Sent off (straight red)	Booked	Sent off (straight red)	Booked	Sent off (straight red)	Booked	Sent off (straight red)	Booked	Sent off (straight red)	Booked	Sent off (straight red)
(Scotland)	GK	Ross Laidlaw	0	0	0	0	0	0	0	0	0	0	0	0
(Scotland)	GK	David McGurn	0	0	0	0	0	0	0	0	0	0	0	0
(Scotland)	GK	Kevin Cuthbert	1	0	0	0	0	0	0	0	0	0	1	0
(Scotland)	GK	Scott Law	0	0	0	0	0	0	0	0	0	0	0	0
(Scotland)	DF	Laurie Ellis	0	0	0	0	0	0	0	0	0	0	0	0
(Scotland)	DF	Jason Thomson	4	0	0	1	0	0	0	0	0	0	4	1
(Scotland)	DF	David Bates	2	0	0	0	0	0	1	0	0	0	3	0
(Scotland)	DF	Craig Barr	2	0	0	0	0	0	0	0	0	0	2	0
(Northern Ireland)	DF	Rory McKeown	3	0	0	0	0	0	0	0	0	0	3	0
(Scotland)	DF	Elliot Ford	0	0	0	0	0	0	0	0	0	0	0	0
(Scotland)	DF	Sean Mackie	0	0	0	0	0	0	0	0	0	0	0	0
(Scotland)	DF	Kyle Benedictus	6	2	0	0	0	0	0	0	1	0	7	2
(Scotland)	DF	Lewis Toshney	8	0	0	0	1	0	0	0	0	0	9	0
(Scotland)	DF	David McKay	0	0	0	0	0	0	0	0	0	0	0	0
(Scotland)	MF	Ross Callachan	6	0	1	0	0	0	1	0	1	0	9	0
(Scotland)	MF	Lewis Vaughan	0	0	0	0	0	0	0	0	0	0	0	0
(Scotland)	MF	Grant Anderson	1	1	1	0	0	0	0	0	0	0	2	1
(Scotland)	MF	Ross Matthews	3	0	0	0	1	0	0	0	0	0	4	0
(Scotland)	MF	Kieran Campbell	0	0	0	0	0	0	0	0	0	0	0	0
(Scotland)	MF	Darren Petrie	0	0	0	0	0	0	0	0	0	0	0	0
(Scotland)	MF	Ryan McCord	5	0	0	0	1	0	0	0	0	0	6	0
(England)	MF	James Craigen	1	0	0	0	0	0	0	0	0	0	1	0
(Scotland)	MF	Iain Davidson	7	0	0	0	0	0	0	0	1	0	8	0
(Scotland)	MF	Scott Robertson	3	0	0	0	0	0	1	0	0	0	4	0
(Scotland)	FW	Callum Robertson	0	0	0	0	0	0	0	0	0	0	0	0
(Scotland)	FW	Jonny Court	0	0	0	0	0	0	0	0	0	0	0	0
(Scotland)	FW	Mark Stewart	1	0	0	0	0	0	0	0	0	0	1	0
(Scotland)	FW	Mitchel Megginson	3	0	0	0	0	0	0	0	0	0	3	0
(Scotland)	FW	Craig Wighton	0	0	0	0	0	0	0	0	0	0	0	0
(Republic of Ireland)	FW	Jon Daly	2	0	0	0	0	0	0	0	0	0	2	0
(Scotland)	FW	Louis Longridge	4	0	0	0	0	0	0	0	0	0	4	0
(Scotland)	FW	Aidan Connolly	0	0	0	0	0	0	0	0	0	0	0	0
(Saint Kitts and Nevis)	FW	Harry Panayiotou	1	0	0	0	0	0	0	0	0	0	1	0
(Scotland)	FW	Ryan Hardie	1	0	0	0	0	0	0	0	0	0	1	0
(France)	FW	Joël Thomas	1	0	0	0	0	0	0	0	0	0	1	0

== Team statistics ==
=== League table ===
Pos	Team	Pld	W	D	L	GF	GA	GD	Pts	Promotion, qualification or relegation
2	Falkirk	36	19	13	4	61	34	+27	70	Qualification for the Premiership play-off semi-finals
3	Hibernian	36	21	7	8	59	34	+25	70	Qualification for the Europa League second qualifying round and for the Premiership play-off quarter-finals (Note: Hibernian qualified for the Europa League second qualifying round by winning the 2015–16 Scottish Cup.)
4	Raith Rovers	36	18	8	10	52	46	+6	62	Qualification for the Premiership play-off quarter-finals
5	Greenock Morton	36	11	10	15	39	42	−3	43	
6	St Mirren	36	11	9	16	44	53	−9	42	

Source: Soccerway
Rules for classification: 1) Points; 2) Goal difference; 3) Number of goals scored

=== Division summary ===
Round	1	2	3	4	5	6	7	8	9	10	11	12	13	14	15	16	17	18	19	20	21	22	23	24	25	26	27	28	29	30	31	32	33	34	35	36
Ground	H	A	H	A	A	H	A	H	H	A	H	A	H	H	A	H	A	A	H	A	A	H	H	A	H	H	A	H	A	H	A	H	A	A	H	A
Result	W	L	W	L	L	W	W	W	W	W	L	L	L	D	D	L	D	W	L	L	W	D	W	D	W	W	L	W	D	W	W	D	W	W	D	W
Position	1	4	4	4	6	5	3	3	2	2	4	4	4	5	5	4	4	4	4	4	4	4	4	5	4	4	4	4	4	4	4	4	4	4	4	4

Updated to match(es) played on 1 May 2016. Source:
A = Away; H = Home; W = Win; D = Draw; L = Loss

=== Management statistics ===
Last updated on 7 May 2016

Name	From	To	P	W	D	L	Win% (Note: Win% is the percentage of matches won rounded to two decimal places.)
Ray McKinnon	23 May 2015	Present	45	23	8	14	51.11

== Transfers ==
=== Players in ===
Player	From	Fee
(Scotland) Kyle Benedictus	(Scotland) Dundee	Free
(England) James Craigen	(Scotland) Partick Thistle	Free
(Scotland) Mitchel Megginson	(Scotland) Dumbarton	Free
(Scotland) Darren Petrie	(Scotland) Dundee United	Free
(Scotland) Ryan McCord	(Scotland) Alloa Athletic	Free
(Scotland) Lewis Toshney	(Scotland) Cowdenbeath	Free
(Scotland) Craig Wighton	(Scotland) Dundee	Loan
(Scotland) Iain Davidson	(Scotland) Dundee	Free
(Republic of Ireland) Jon Daly	Free agent	Free

=== Players out ===
Player	To	Fee
(France) Christian Nadé	(Scotland) Hamilton Academical	Free
(Scotland) Ryan Conroy	(Scotland) Queen of the South	Free
(Scotland) Paul Watson	(Scotland) Falkirk	Free
(Scotland) Dougie Hill	(Scotland) Alloa Athletic	Free
(Scotland) Martin Scott	(India) Salgaocar	Free
(Scotland) Andrew Munro	(Scotland) Arbroath	Free
(Scotland) Liam Fox	(Scotland) Heart of Midlothian (Note: Liam Fox moved to a coaching role at Heart of Midlothian.)	Free
(Scotland) Calum Elliot		Retired
(Scotland) Kevin Moon		Free
(Scotland) Liam McCroary		Free
