= 2016–17 Falkirk F.C. season =

Falkirk
2016–17 season
- Chairman: Doug Henderson
- Manager: Peter Houston
- Stadium: Falkirk Stadium
- Championship: Runners-up
- Premiership play-off: Semi-final
- League Cup: Group stage
- Challenge Cup: Fourth round
- Scottish Cup: Fourth round
- Top goalscorer: League: Craig Sibbald (10); All: Sibbald, Baird & Miller (10)
- Highest home attendance: 7,926 vs. Dundee United, Play-offs, 19 May 2017
- Lowest home attendance: 1,073 vs. Brechin City, League Cup, 30 July 2016
- Average home league attendance: 5,032
Home colours	Away colours

The 2016–17 season was Falkirk's fourth season in the Scottish Championship and their sixth consecutive season in the second-tier of Scottish football following their relegation from the Scottish Premier League at the end of the 2009–10 season . Falkirk also competed in the Challenge Cup, League Cup and the Scottish Cup.

== Summary ==
=== Season ===
Falkirk finished as runners-up in the Scottish Championship for the second consecutive season and qualified for the Premiership play-offs, losing to Dundee United in the semi-final.

== Results and fixtures ==
Win Draw Loss Postponed

=== Scottish Championship ===
6 August 2016 1	Falkirk	1–2	Hibernian	Falkirk Stadium, Falkirk
15:00	Sibbald 9'	Report	Cummings 2', 48'	Attendance: 6,458; Referee: Kevin Clancy

13 August 2016 2	Greenock Morton	1–1	Falkirk	Cappielow, Greenock
15:00	Kilday 25'	Report	Leahy 90+2'	Attendance: 2,079; Referee: John Beaton

20 August 2016 3	Queen of the South	2–0	Falkirk	Palmerston Park, Dumfries
15:00	Dobbie 34', 50'	Report		Attendance: 1,841; Referee: Steven Kirkland

27 August 2016 4	Falkirk	1–0	Dumbarton	Falkirk Stadium, Falkirk
15:00	Miller 86'	Report		Attendance: 4,311; Referee: Don Robertson

10 September 2016 5	Raith Rovers	0–2	Falkirk	Stark's Park, Kirkcaldy
15:00		Report	Baird 30'; Taiwo 72'	Attendance: 2,320; Referee: Euan Anderson

17 September 2016 6	Falkirk	3–1	Dundee United	Falkirk Stadium, Falkirk
15:00	Baird 18'; Hippolyte 87'; Miller 89'	Report	Obadeyi 33'	Attendance: 5,488; Referee: Crawford Allan

24 September 2016 7	Falkirk	2–0	Ayr United	Falkirk Stadium, Falkirk
15:00	Meggatt 78' (o.g.); Miller 90+1'	Report		Attendance: 4,345; Referee: Willie Collum

1 October 2016 8	St Mirren	1–1	Falkirk	St Mirren Park, Paisley
17:15	Walsh 87'	Report	Sibbald 9'	Attendance: 2,334; Referee: John Beaton

15 October 2016 9	Falkirk	2–1	Dunfermline Athletic	Falkirk Stadium, Falkirk
15:00	Sibbald 27'; Hippolyte 52'	Report	El Alagui 75'	Attendance: 6,377; Referee: Andrew Dallas

22 October 2016 10	Falkirk	2–4	Raith Rovers	Falkirk Stadium, Falkirk
15:00	Baird 18'; Miller 75'	Report	Davidson 17'; Stewart 37', 79'; McManus 72'	Attendance: 4,773; Referee: Barry Cook

29 October 2016 11	Dundee United	1–0	Falkirk	Tannadice Park, Dundee
15:00	Durnan 82'	Report		Attendance: 7,046; Referee: Euan Anderson

5 November 2016 12	Falkirk	1–1	Greenock Morton	Falkirk Stadium, Falkirk
15:00	Miller 90+3'	Report	Kilday 87'	Attendance: 4,432; Referee: Greg Aitken

12 November 2016 13	Hibernian	1–1	Falkirk	Easter Road, Edinburgh
15:00	Hanlon 83'	Report	Taiwo (red card) 25'; Baird 78'	Attendance: 14,551; Referee: John Beaton

19 November 2016 14	Ayr United	0–1	Falkirk	Somerset Park, Ayr
15:00		Report	Craigen 15'	Attendance: 1,414; Referee: Gavin Duncan

3 December 2016 15	Falkirk	3–1	St Mirren	Falkirk Stadium, Falkirk
15:00	Miller 47'; McHugh 78'; Hippolyte 83'	Report	Morgan 17'	Attendance: 4,486; Referee: Craig Thomson

10 December 2016 16	Falkirk	2–2	Queen of the South	Falkirk Stadium, Falkirk
15:00	Hippolyte 45+2', 54'	Report	Dobbie 34'; Lyle 60'	Attendance: 4,170; Referee: Nick Walsh

17 December 2016 17	Dumbarton	2–1	Falkirk	Dumbarton Football Stadium, Dumbarton
15:00	Muirhead 44' (o.g.); Fleming 68'	Report	Sibbald 66'	Attendance: 832; Referee: Matt Northcroft

26 December 2016 18	Dunfermline Athletic	1–1	Falkirk	East End Park, Dunfermline
15:00	McCabe 59' (pen.)	Report	Hippolyte 10'	Attendance: 6,134; Referee: Euan Anderson

31 December 2016 19	Falkirk	1–2	Hibernian	Falkirk Stadium, Falkirk
12:30	Sibbald 15'	Report	Cummings 17'; Commons 87'	Attendance: 6,747; Referee: Crawford Allan

7 January 2017 20	Raith Rovers	1–4	Falkirk	Stark's Park, Kirkcaldy
15:00	Johnston 9'	Report	Hippolyte 16'; McHugh 25'; Sibbald 38', 48'	Attendance: 2,202; Referee: Andrew Dallas

14 January 2017 21	Falkirk	1–1	Ayr United	Falkirk Stadium, Falkirk
15:00	Grant 45+2'	Report	Harkins 24'	Attendance: 5,038; Referee: Bobby Madden

28 January 2017 22	St Mirren	1–2	Falkirk	St Mirren Park, Paisley
15:00	Loy 77'	Report	Baird 11', 63'	Attendance: 2,202; Referee: Alan Muir

4 February 2017 23	Falkirk	2–0	Dunfermline Athletic	Falkirk Stadium, Falkirk
15:00	Baird 34'; Miller 77'	Report		Attendance: 5,953; Referee: Willie Collum

11 February 2017 24	Falkirk	3–0	Dundee United	Falkirk Stadium, Falkirk
15:00	Baird 5'; Muirhead 53' (pen.); Craigen 60'	Report		Attendance: 5,028; Referee: Euan Anderson

18 February 2017 25	Greenock Morton	2–2	Falkirk	Cappielow, Greenock
15:00	O'Ware 13'; Forbes 68'	Report	Craigen 43'; Muirhead 50' (pen.)	Attendance: 2,397; Referee: Greg Aitken

25 February 2017 26	Falkirk	2–2	Dumbarton	Falkirk Stadium, Falkirk
15:00	Leahy 37'; Austin 59'	Report	Vaughan 38'; Stirling 51'	Attendance: 4,160; Referee: Matt Northcroft

4 March 2017 27	Queen of the South	0–2	Falkirk	Palmerston Park, Dumfries
15:00		Report	Kidd 45'; Sibbald 79' (pen.)	Attendance: 1,995; Referee: Gavin Duncan

11 March 2017 28	Ayr United	1–4	Falkirk	Somerset Park, Ayr
15:00	Harkins 64'	Report	Austin 8', 63'; Sibbald 90'; Aird 90+2'	Attendance: 1,614; Referee: Steven McLean

18 March 2017 29	Falkirk	0–1	Greenock Morton	Falkirk Stadium, Falkirk
17:15		Report	Oyenuga 79'	Attendance: 4,584; Referee: Alan Muir

25 March 2017 30	Hibernian	2–1	Falkirk	Easter Road, Edinburgh
15:00	Ambrose 75'; Keatings 90+2'	Report	Sibbald 77'	Attendance: 16,140; Referee: Kevin Clancy

1 April 2017 31	Falkirk	1–0	Raith Rovers	Falkirk Stadium, Falkirk
15:00	Miller 71'	Report		Attendance: 4,823; Referee: Alan Muir

8 April 2017 32	Dundee United	1–1	Falkirk	Tannadice Park, Dundee
15:00	Murray 50'	Report	Leahy 83'	Attendance: 6,313; Referee: Euan Anderson

15 April 2017 33	Falkirk	2–2	St Mirren	Falkirk Stadium, Falkirk
15:00	Miller 20'; McHugh 77'	Report	Loy 5'; McGinn 59'	Attendance: 4,734; Referee: Craig Thomson

22 April 2017 34	Dunfermline Athletic	1–2	Falkirk	East End Park, Dunfermline
15:00	Clark 35'; Martin (red card) 58'	Report	Muirhead 53'; Austin 70'	Attendance: 5,076; Referee: Gavin Duncan

29 April 2017 35	Falkirk	2–2	Queen of the South	Falkirk Stadium, Falkirk
15:00	Austin 31'; Muirhead 71' (pen.)	Report	Dobbie 9', 78'	Attendance: 4,673; Referee: Crawford Allan

6 May 2017 36	Dumbarton	0–1	Falkirk	Dumbarton Football Stadium, Dumbarton
15:00		Report	Austin 85'	Attendance: 1,660; Referee: Don Robertson

=== Premiership play-off ===
16 May 2017 Semi-final 1st Leg	Dundee United	2–2	Falkirk	Tannadice Park, Dundee
19:45	Murray 16'; Spittal 53'	Report	Craigen 27'; McKee 59'	Attendance: 7,034; Referee: Bobby Madden

19 May 2017 Semi-final 2nd Leg	Falkirk	1–2 (3–4 agg.)	Dundee United	Falkirk Stadium, Falkirk
19:45	Craigen 11'	Report	Murray 76'; Spittal 87'	Attendance: 7,926; Referee: Kevin Clancy

=== Scottish League Cup ===
==== Group stage ====
Results

16 July 2016 Group stage	Stirling Albion	1–0	Falkirk	Forthbank Stadium, Stirling
15:00	Smith 41'	Report		Attendance: 1,315; Referee: Colin Steven

19 July 2016 Group stage	Falkirk	3–0	Elgin City	Falkirk Stadium, Falkirk
15:00	Vaulks 28'; Miller 36'; McHugh 88'	Report		Attendance: 1,276; Referee: Kevin Graham

23 July 2016 Group stage	St Johnstone	3–0	Falkirk	McDiarmid Park, Perth
15:00	Swanson 25' (pen.), 38' (pen.); MacLean 68'	Report		Attendance: 2,725; Referee: Bobby Madden

30 July 2016 Group stage	Falkirk	2–0	Brechin City	Falkirk Stadium, Falkirk
15:00	Gasparotto 50'; Austin 53'	Report		Attendance: 1,073; Referee: Kevin Graham

=== Group G Table ===
Pos	Team	Pld	W	PW	PL	L	GF	GA	GD	Pts	Qualification	STJ	FAL	STI	BRE	ELG
1	St Johnstone (Q)	4	3	0	1	0	11	2	+9	10	Qualification for the Second round	—	3–0	4–0	—	—
2	Falkirk	4	2	0	0	2	5	4	+1	6		—	—	—	2–0	3–0
3	Stirling Albion	4	2	0	0	2	6	7	−1	6		—	1–0	—	—	4–1
4	Brechin City	4	1	1	0	2	5	8	−3	5		p1–1	—	2–1	—	—
5	Elgin City	4	1	0	0	3	6	12	−6	3		1–3	—	—	4–2	—

Source: SPFL
(Q) Qualified to the phase indicated

=== Scottish Challenge Cup ===
3 September 2016 Third round	Falkirk	6–1	Elgin City	Falkirk Stadium, Falkirk
15:00	McHugh 5', 55'; Hippolyte 32'; Baird 43', 71'; McCracken 48'	Report	Nicolson 38'	Attendance: 1,591; Referee: Colin Steven

7 October 2016 Fourth round	Ayr United	1–0 (a.e.t.)	Falkirk	Somerset Park, Ayr
19:45	Harkins 114'	Report		Attendance: 1,247; Referee: Alan Muir

=== Scottish Cup ===
21 January 2017 Fourth round	Greenock Morton	2–0	Falkirk	Cappielow, Greenock
15:00	Lindsay 39'; Forbes 47'	Report		Attendance: 2,349; Referee: Greg Aitken

== Player statistics ==
As of 19 May 2017 (UTC)

No.	Pos	Nat	Player	Total		Championship		League Cup		Scottish Cup		Other	
No.	Pos	Nat	Player	Apps	Goals	Apps	Goals	Apps	Goals	Apps	Goals	Apps	Goals
1	GK	(Republic of Ireland) IRL	Danny Rogers	32	0	28+0	0	3+0	0	1+0	0	0+0	0
2	DF	(Scotland) SCO	Lewis Kidd	18	1	12+2	1	2+0	0	0+0	0	2+0	0
3	DF	(Scotland) SCO	Luke Leahy	38	3	31+0	3	4+0	0	0+0	0	3+0	0
4	DF	(Scotland) SCO	Aaron Muirhead	31	4	24+2	4	2+0	0	1+0	0	2+0	0
5	DF	(Scotland) SCO	David McCracken	18	1	16+0	0	0+0	0	1+0	0	1+0	1
6	MF	(Scotland) SCO	Joe McKee	5	1	2+1	0	0+0	0	0+0	0	2+0	1
7	MF	(England) ENG	Tom Taiwo	38	1	30+1	1	1+3	0	0+0	0	1+2	0
8	MF	(Scotland) SCO	Mark Kerr	39	0	29+1	0	4+0	0	1+0	0	4+0	0
9	FW	(Scotland) SCO	John Baird	43	10	32+2	8	2+2	0	0+1	0	2+2	2
10	MF	(Scotland) SCO	Craig Sibbald	45	10	35+1	10	4+0	0	1+0	0	3+1	0
11	FW	(England) ENG	Myles Hippolyte	35	8	22+8	7	1+0	0	1+0	0	2+1	1
14	DF	(Scotland) SCO	Peter Grant	22	1	20+1	1	0+0	0	0+0	0	1+0	0
15	DF	(Canada) CAN	Luca Gasparotto	36	1	27+2	0	4+0	1	0+0	0	3+0	0
16	FW	(England) ENG	Nathan Austin	23	7	7+10	6	2+2	1	0+0	0	2+0	0
18	FW	(Scotland) SCO	Lee Miller	37	10	16+14	9	1+2	1	1+0	0	2+1	0
19	FW	(Scotland) SCO	Bob McHugh	42	6	15+18	3	2+2	1	0+1	0	2+2	2
21	FW	(Scotland) SCO	Scott Shepherd	13	0	2+9	0	0+0	0	0+0	0	1+1	0
22	DF	(Scotland) SCO	Liam Henderson	0	0	0+0	0	0+0	0	0+0	0	0+0	0
23	DF	(Scotland) SCO	Tony Gallacher	8	0	5+1	0	0+0	0	1+0	0	1+0	0
24	GK	(Scotland) SCO	Robbie Thomson	9	0	7+0	0	0+0	0	0+0	0	2+0	0
26	GK	(Scotland) SCO	Lewis McMinn	0	0	0+0	0	0+0	0	0+0	0	0+0	0
28	MF	(England) ENG	James Craigen	34	5	13+14	3	4+0	0	1+0	0	2+0	2
30	FW	(Scotland) SCO	Kevin O'Hara	0	0	0+0	0	0+0	0	0+0	0	0+0	0
31	MF	(Scotland) SCO	Cameron Blues	1	0	0+0	0	0+0	0	0+0	0	0+1	0
33	MF	(Canada) CAN	Fraser Aird	13	1	5+7	1	0+0	0	1+0	0	0+0	0
44	DF	(Scotland) SCO	Paul Watson	19	0	10+1	0	4+0	0	1+0	0	3+0	0
Players who left the club during the 2016–17 season
6	MF	(Wales) WAL	Will Vaulks	1	1	0+0	0	1+0	1	0+0	0	0+0	0
6	MF	(Scotland) SCO	John Rankin	17	0	7+6	0	2+0	0	0+0	0	1+1	0
58	GK	(Turkey) TUR	Deniz Mehmet	2	0	0+0	0	0+0	0	0+0	0	2+0	0

== Club statistics ==
=== League table ===
Pos	Team	Pld	W	D	L	GF	GA	GD	Pts	Promotion, qualification or relegation
1	Hibernian (C, P)	36	19	14	3	59	25	+34	71	Promotion to Premiership
2	Falkirk	36	16	12	8	58	40	+18	60	Qualification for the Premiership play-off semi-finals
3	Dundee United	36	15	12	9	50	42	+8	57	Qualification for the Premiership play-off quarter-finals
4	Greenock Morton	36	13	13	10	44	41	+3	52	Qualification for the Premiership play-off quarter-finals
5	Dunfermline Athletic	36	12	12	12	46	43	+3	48	

Source: Soccerway
Rules for classification: 1) Points; 2) Goal difference; 3) Number of goals scored
(C) Champions; (P) Promoted

=== Division summary ===
Round	1	2	3	4	5	6	7	8	9	10	11	12	13	14	15	16	17	18	19	20	21	22	23	24	25	26	27	28	29	30	31	32	33	34	35	36
Ground	H	A	A	H	A	H	H	A	H	H	A	H	A	A	H	H	A	A	H	A	H	A	H	H	A	H	A	A	H	A	H	A	H	A	H	A
Result	L	D	L	W	W	W	W	D	W	L	L	D	D	W	W	D	L	D	L	W	D	W	W	W	D	D	W	W	L	L	W	D	D	W	D	W
Position	9	7	8	6	5	4	3	3	3	5	5	5	5	5	3	3	3	4	4	4	4	4	3	3	3	2	2	2	2	2	2	2	2	2	2	2

Updated to match(es) played on 6 May 2017. Source:
A = Away; H = Home; W = Win; D = Draw; L = Loss

== Transfers ==
=== Players in ===
Player	From	Fee
(England) James Craigen	(Scotland) Raith Rovers	Free
(Scotland) Lewis Kidd	(Scotland) Queen of the South	Free
(Canada) Luca Gasparotto	(Scotland) Rangers	Free
(Republic of Ireland) Danny Rogers	(Scotland) Aberdeen	Loan
(Scotland) John Rankin	(Scotland) Dundee United	Free
(Scotland) Robbie Thomson	(Scotland) Hamilton Academical	Free
(Canada) Fraser Aird	(Scotland) Rangers	Free
(Scotland) Joe McKee	(England) Carlisle United	Free

=== Players out ===
Player	To	Fee
(Scotland) Blair Alston	(Scotland) St Johnstone	Free
(Scotland) David Smith	(Scotland) Dumbarton	Free
(Wales) Will Vaulks	(England) Rotherham United	Undisclosed
(Scotland) Kevin O'Hara	(Scotland) East Fife	Loan
(Scotland) Kevin McCann	(Scotland) Albion Rovers	Free
(Scotland) John Rankin	(Scotland) Queen of the South	Free
(Scotland) Liam Henderson	(Scotland) Cowdenbeath	Loan
(Turkey) Deniz Mehmet	(England) Port Vale	Free

== See also ==
- List of Falkirk F.C. seasons
