= James Craigen (footballer) =

English footballer (born 1991)

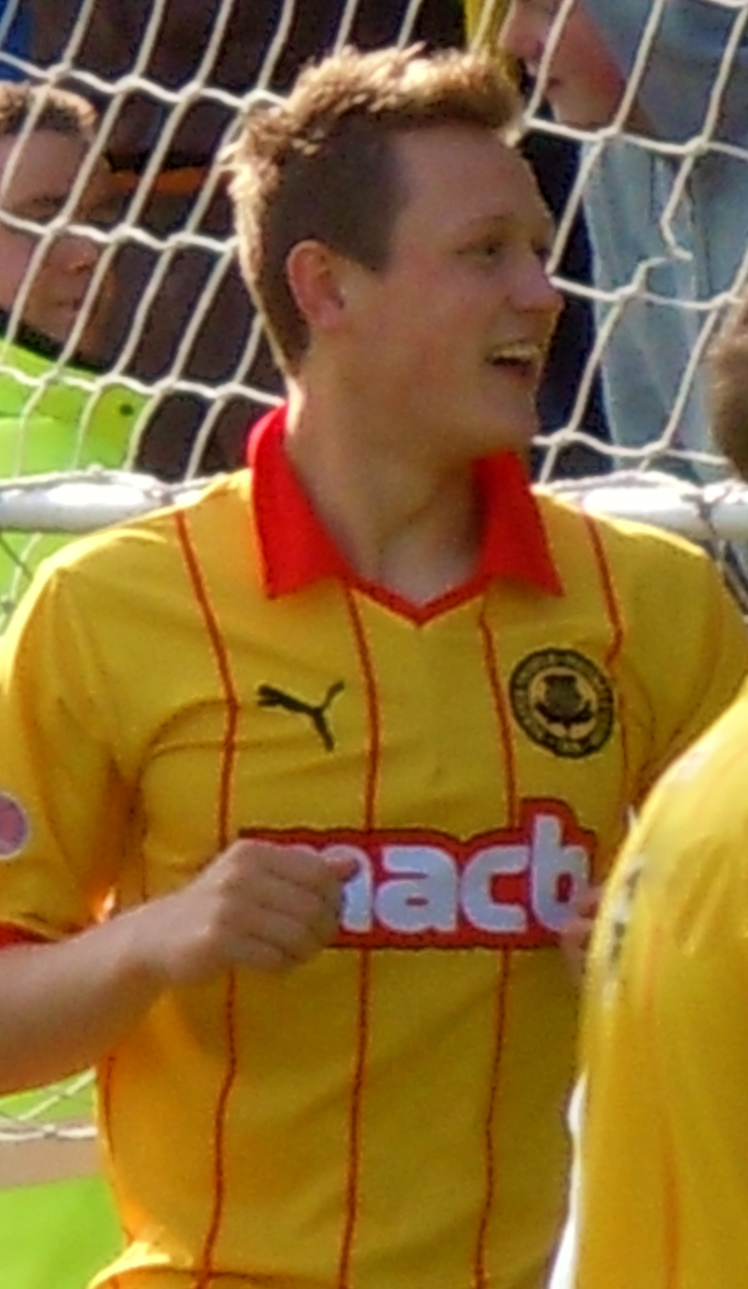

Personal information
- Date of birth: 28 March 1991 (age 35)
- Place of birth: Preston, England
- Height: 6 ft 0 in (1.83 m)
- Position: Midfielder

Team information
- Current team: The Spartans (player/manager)
- Number: 28

Youth career
- 1999–2009: Preston North End
- 2009–2012: Edinburgh University

Senior career*
Years	Team	Apps	(Gls)
2012–2015	Partick Thistle	76	(4)
2012–2013	→ Forfar Athletic (loan)	10	(2)
2015–2016	Raith Rovers	34	(9)
2016–2018	Falkirk	37	(3)
2018–2019	Dunfermline Athletic	48	(2)
2019–2020	AFC Fylde	15	(0)
2020	→ Arbroath (loan)	4	(0)
2020–2022	Arbroath	59	(5)
2022–2023	Edinburgh City	31	(3)
2023–	The Spartans	101	(6)

Managerial career
- 2026–: The Spartans
- * Club domestic league appearances and goals as of 4 May 2026

James Craigen (born 28 March 1991) is an English professional football player and coach who is currently the player/manager of Scottish League Two club The Spartans. He started his career at Preston North End, where he spent 10 years as a youth player. He was also part of the Edinburgh University team; the university which he was a student at. He then made the leap from non-league football to Scotland's second tier, joining Scottish First Division club Partick Thistle where, against Greenock Morton, he scored the decisive goal that sealed Thistle's promotion to the Scottish Premiership. He has also spent time on loan at Forfar Athletic, and after leaving Partick Thistle, played with Raith Rovers, Falkirk, Dunfermline Athletic, Arbroath and Edinburgh City.

== Career ==
=== Youth ===
Craigen played for the Edinburgh University football side, while concentrating on his academic studies. He also turned out for the Scottish University side when they won the BUCS Home Nations Tournament. Craigen was selected for the Great Britain University side at the 2011 Student Games in Japan, where the team finished runners-up.

=== Partick Thistle ===
Craigen signed for Partick Thistle at the start of the 2012–13 Season, whilst also completing his final year at university. He joined Forfar Athletic on loan in October 2012, and returned to Thistle in early 2013. He scored twice during his loan period.

On his return to Partick Thistle, Craigen established himself in the starting eleven during the title run-in. He scored the only goal in a 1–0 victory at home to Morton in April 2013, a victory that essentially secured the league title for Partick Thistle.

In May 2015, Craigen was named as one of the players that would be released by Partick Thistle at the end of the 2014–15 season.

=== Raith Rovers ===
Craigen signed for Scottish Championship side Raith Rovers on 26 June 2015.

=== Falkirk ===
On 10 March 2016, Craigen signed a pre contract deal with fellow Scottish Championship side Falkirk. In his first season with the club, Craigen helped Falkirk to a second-place finish in the league, playing 27 matches and scoring 3 goals. He scored a further two goals in each of the Scottish Premiership semi-final play-offs against Dundee United, although the Bairns fell short of reaching the final after losing 3–4 on aggregate.

Craigen was a bit-part player in his second season at the club, and was subsequently released in January 2018, after a year and a half with the club.

=== Dunfermline Athletic ===
Craigen subsequently signed for Scottish Championship and Falkirk-rivals Dunfermline Athletic on 19 January 2018, on a deal that would keep him at the club until summer 2018. Craigen's contract was renewed until May 2019, after which point it was announced that he would be leaving the club in order to seek a fresh challenge.

=== Later career ===
Following stints with AFC Fylde, Arbroath (initially on loan), and Edinburgh City, Craigen signed for The Spartans in 2023. He was appointed player/manager in October 2026.

== Career statistics ==
As of 21 May 2019

Appearances and goals by club, season and competition
Club	Season	League			Cup		League Cup		Other		Total	
Club	Season	Division	Apps	Goals	Apps	Goals	Apps	Goals	Apps	Goals	Apps	Goals
Partick Thistle	2012–13	Scottish First Division	19	2	0	0	2	0	2 (Note: Appearances in the Scottish Challenge Cup)	0	23	2
Partick Thistle	2013–14	Scottish Premiership	31	0	1	0	2	0	—		34	0
Partick Thistle	2014–15	Scottish Premiership	26	2	2	0	3	0	—		31	2
Partick Thistle	Total		76	4	3	0	7	0	2	0	88	4
Forfar Athletic (loan)	2012–13	Scottish Second Division	10	2	1	0	0	0	0	0	11	2
Raith Rovers	2015–16	Scottish Championship	34	9	2	0	3	0	3 (Note: One appearance in the Scottish Challenge Cup and two in the Scottish Premiership play-offs)	0	42	9
Falkirk	2016–17	Scottish Championship	27	3	1	0	4	0	2 (Note: Appearances in the Scottish Premiership play-offs)	2	34	5
Falkirk	2017–18	Scottish Championship	10	0	0	0	4	1	3	1	17	2
Falkirk	Total		37	3	1	0	8	1	5	3	51	7
Dunfermline Athletic	2017–18	Scottish Championship	15	1	1	0	0	0	2 (Note: Appearances in the Scottish Premiership play-offs)	0	18	1
Dunfermline Athletic	2018–19	Scottish Championship	33	1	1	0	5	0	2	0	41	1
Dunfermline Athletic	Total		48	2	2	0	5	0	4	0	59	2
Career total			205	20	9	0	23	1	14	3	251	24
