= Bob McHugh (footballer) =

Scottish footballer

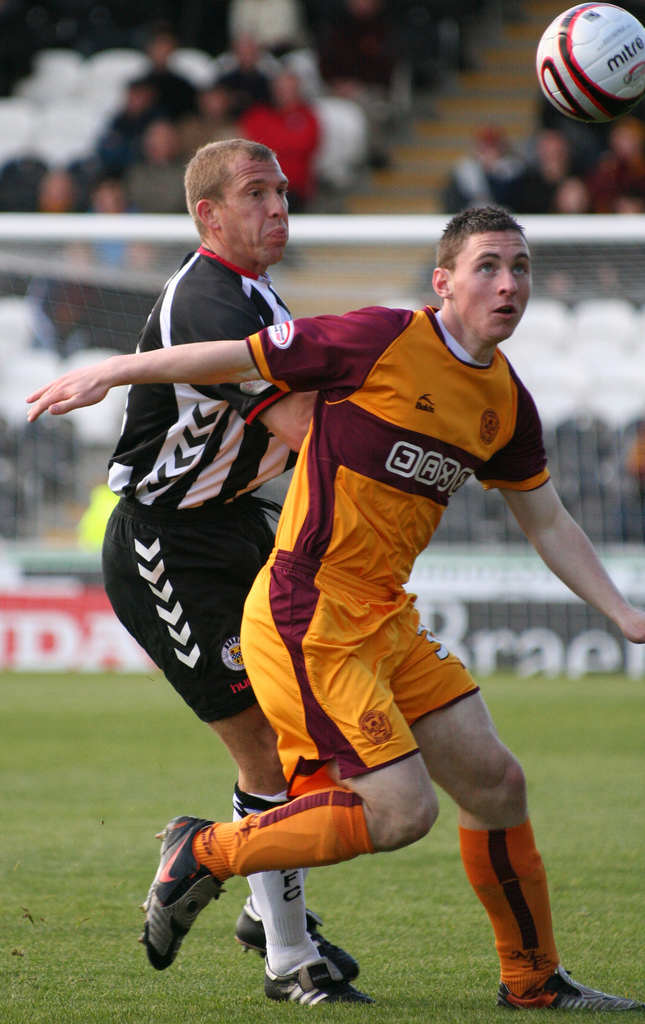
- McHugh (right) playing for Motherwell

Personal information
- Full name: Robert McHugh
- Date of birth: 16 July 1991 (age 35)
- Place of birth: Glasgow, Scotland
- Height: 5 ft 10 in (1.78 m)
- Position: Striker

Team information
- Current team: Pollok FC

Senior career*
Years	Team	Apps	(Gls)
2007–2015	Motherwell	70	(5)
2014	→ Queen of the South (loan)	13	(1)
2015	→ Airdrieonians (loan)	5	(4)
2015–2017	Falkirk	55	(9)
2017–2020	Greenock Morton	81	(18)
2020–2022	Queen's Park	51	(14)
2022–2023	East Kilbride	0	(0)
2023-2025	St Cadoc's		
2025-	Pollok	39	(21)

International career
2007–2008	Scotland U17	8	(2)
2009–2010	Scotland U19	6	(2)
- * Club domestic league appearances and goals as of 02:57, 12 June 2022 (UTC)

Robert McHugh (born 16 July 1991) is a Scottish professional footballer who plays as a striker for Pollok. McHugh has previously played for Motherwell, Falkirk, Greenock Morton and Queen's Park, as well as loan spells with Queen of the South, Airdrieonians and East Kilbride.

== Career ==
=== Motherwell ===
Born in Glasgow, McHugh made his Motherwell debut when he came on as a substitute in a 2–0 win over Hibernian in May 2008.

McHugh scored his first Motherwell goal when he took the field as a substitute in an 8–1 win over Flamurtari in the Europa League second round, scoring Motherwell's eighth goal in that match. He also scored the first goal as Motherwell beat Inverness CT 3–2 after extra time in the third round of the 2009–10 League Cup.

On 21 January 2011, McHugh joined First Division side Partick Thistle on loan until 27 March 2011. However, a broken wrist meant the loan would not happen, and so he stayed at the Fir Park club.

On 26 March 2013, McHugh signed a new two-year contract with Motherwell, lasting until summer 2015.

On 2 June 2015, Motherwell announced that McHugh was amongst the players leaving the club, with his contract having expired.

==== Queen of the South (loan) ====
On 13 January 2014, McHugh signed a six-month loan with Dumfries club Queen of the South.

On 3 May 2014, McHugh scored a goal notable amongst supporters of Alloa Athletic by scoring a 95th-minute equaliser for Queen of the South against Cowdenbeath. McHugh's goal sent Cowdenbeath into the relegation play-offs and secured Alloa's place in the Championship.

His scoring form continued into the Scottish Premiership play-offs as he scored both goals in the 2–1 quarter-final first leg home win against Falkirk on 6 May 2014. Four days later he scored in the return leg as Queen of the South were knocked out 4–3 on aggregate after a 3–1 defeat.

==== Airdrieonians (loan) ====
On 31 March 2015, McHugh signed for Scottish League One club Airdrieonians on loan until the end of the 2014–15 season. He made his debut on 4 April 2015, in a 2–0 win away to Stirling Albion.

=== Falkirk ===
On 14 July 2015, McHugh signed for Falkirk, agreeing a two-year contract having played as a trialist for the club in friendlies against Drogheda United and Athlone Town, scoring twice in both matches. After his contract ended in May 2017, McHugh was released by the club.

=== Morton ===
McHugh subsequently signed a two-year contract with Scottish Championship side Greenock Morton on 2 June 2017. On 10 August 2019, he scored his first career hat-trick in Morton's 4–1 win at home against Alloa Athletic.

=== Queen's Park ===
After a third successful season at Cappielow, McHugh joined the newly professional Queen's Park in June 2020.

=== East Kilbride ===
After two seasons with Queen's Park, McHugh dropped out of the SPFL and signed with East Kilbride in June 2022, ending his solitary season at K-Park with twenty goals and a Lowland League Cup winners medal.

=== St Cadoc's ===
McHugh signed for newly-promoted West of Scotland Premier Division side St Cadoc's in May 2023. He re-signed for a second season and was the club's top goal scorer in 2024-25, before leaving upon the expiration of his contract.

=== Pollok ===
McHugh's next move saw him staying in the same league as he moved to Pollok in July 2025. His first goal was a last-minute winner away to Rutherglen Glencairn in the league, and he went on to score 22 goals in all competitions, ending the season with a hat-trick against former side St Cadoc's as Pollok secured promotion to the new Lowland League West. He renewed his contract that summer, committing himself to the Lok for their first season in Tier 5, and started the season with two hat-tricks against Livingston United and Civil Service Strollers in the Scottish Communities and South Challenge Cups respectively.

== Career statistics ==
As of match played 23 April 2021

Appearances and goals by club, season and competition
Club	Season	League			Scottish Cup		League Cup		Other		Total	
Club	Season	Division	Apps	Goals	Apps	Goals	Apps	Goals	Apps	Goals	Apps	Goals
Motherwell	2007–08	Scottish Premier League	1	0	0	0	0	0	0	0	1	0
Motherwell	2008–09	Scottish Premier League	2	0	0	0	0	0	0	0	2	0
Motherwell	2009–10	Scottish Premier League	10	0	0	0	2	1	3 (Note: Appearances in the Europa League)	1	15	2
Motherwell	2010–11	Scottish Premier League	11	0	2	0	1	0	3	0	17	0
Motherwell	2011–12	Scottish Premier League	9	1	1	0	2	0	0	0	12	1
Motherwell	2012–13	Scottish Premier League	25	3	1	0	0	0	3 (Note: One appearance in the Champions League and two in the Europa League)	0	29	3
Motherwell	2013–14	Scottish Premiership	8	1	1	0	2	1	1	0	12	2
Motherwell	2014–15	Scottish Premiership	4	0	0	0	0	0	0	0	4	0
Motherwell	Total		70	5	5	0	7	2	10	1	92	8
Queen of the South (loan)	2013–14	Scottish Championship	13	1	0	0	0	0	2 (Note: Appearances in the Premiership play-offs)	3	15	4
Airdrieonians (loan)	2014–15	Scottish League One	5	4	0	0	0	0	0	0	5	4
Falkirk	2015–16	Scottish Championship	22	6	1	0	2	1	6 (Note: Two appearances and a goal in the Scottish Challenge Cup; four appearances and two goals in the Premiership play-offs)	3	31	10
Falkirk	2016–17	Scottish Championship	33	3	1	0	4	1	4 (Note: Two appearances and two goals in the Scottish Challenge Cup; two appearances in the Premiership play-offs)	2	42	6
Falkirk	Total		55	9	2	0	6	2	10	5	73	16
Greenock Morton	2017–18	Scottish Championship	32	4	3	1	4	3	1 (Note: Appearance in the Scottish Challenge Cup)	0	40	8
Greenock Morton	2018–19	Scottish Championship	29	6	3	2	4	2	0	0	36	10
Greenock Morton	2019–20	Scottish Championship	20	8	2	1	5	3	0	0	27	12
Greenock Morton	Total		81	18	8	4	13	8	1	0	103	30
Queen's Park	2020–21	Scottish League Two	18	6	2	0	4	0	0	0	24	6
Career total			252	43	17	4	30	12	23	9	312	68
