= 2015–16 Scottish Premiership =

Football league in Scotland

Scottish Premiership
- Season: 2015–16
- Dates: 1 August 2015 – 22 May 2016
- Champions: Celtic; 3rd Premiership title 47th Scottish title
- Relegated: Dundee United
- Champions League: Celtic
- Europa League: Aberdeen; Heart of Midlothian
- Matches: 228
- Goals: 650 (2.85 per match)
- Top goalscorer: Leigh Griffiths (31 goals)
- Biggest home win: Celtic 8–1 Hamilton Academical (19 January 2016)
- Biggest away win: Kilmarnock 0–4 Dundee (1 August 2015); Kilmarnock 0–4 Ross County (22 August 2015); Aberdeen 1–5 St Johnstone (3 October 2015); Partick Thistle 0–4 Heart of Midlothian (31 October 2015); Kilmarnock 0–4 Aberdeen (19 December 2015)
- Highest scoring: Celtic 8–1 Hamilton Academical (19 January 2016)
- Longest winning run: 8 matches: Aberdeen
- Longest unbeaten run: 12 matches: Aberdeen
- Longest winless run: 10 matches: Dundee United
- Longest losing run: 5 matches: Partick Thistle
- Highest attendance: 49,050; Celtic 7–0 Motherwell (15 May 2016)
- Lowest attendance: 1,516; Hamilton Academical 0–1 Inverness CT (11 May 2016)
- Total attendance: 2,237,437
- Average attendance: 9,644 (838)
- All statistics correct as of 15 May 2016.

The 2015–16 Scottish Premiership (known as the Ladbrokes Premiership for sponsorship reasons) was the third season of the Scottish Premiership, the highest division of Scottish football. The season began on 1 August 2015. Celtic were the defending champions.

Twelve teams contested the league: Aberdeen, Celtic, Dundee, Dundee United, Hamilton Academical, Heart of Midlothian, Inverness CT, Kilmarnock, Motherwell, Partick Thistle, Ross County and St Johnstone.

== Teams ==
Promoted from Scottish Championship

- Heart of Midlothian

Relegated from Scottish Premiership

- St Mirren

=== Stadia and locations ===
| Aberdeen | Celtic | Dundee | Dundee United |
|---|---|---|---|
| Pittodrie Stadium | Celtic Park | Dens Park | Tannadice Park |
| Capacity: 20,897 | Capacity: 60,355 | Capacity: 11,506 | Capacity: 14,229 |
| Hamilton Academical | Location of teams in 2015–16 Scottish Premiership | | Heart of Midlothian |
| New Douglas Park | Location of teams in 2015–16 Scottish Premiership | | Tynecastle Stadium |
| Capacity: 6,078 | Location of teams in 2015–16 Scottish Premiership | | Capacity: 17,529 |
| Inverness Caledonian Thistle | Location of teams in 2015–16 Scottish Premiership | | Kilmarnock |
| Caledonian Stadium | Location of teams in 2015–16 Scottish Premiership | | Rugby Park |
| Capacity: 7,800 | Location of teams in 2015–16 Scottish Premiership | | Capacity: 18,128 |
| Motherwell | Partick Thistle | Ross County | St Johnstone |
| Fir Park | Firhill Stadium | Victoria Park | McDiarmid Park |
| Capacity: 13,677 | Capacity: 10,102 | Capacity: 6,541 | Capacity: 10,696 |

=== Personnel and kits ===
| Team | Manager | Captain | Kit manufacturer | Shirt sponsor |
|---|---|---|---|---|
| Aberdeen | (Scotland) Derek McInnes | (Scotland) Ryan Jack | Adidas | Saltire Energy |
| Celtic | (Norway) Ronny Deila | (Scotland) Scott Brown | New Balance | Magners |
| Dundee | (Scotland) Paul Hartley | (Northern Ireland) James McPake | Puma | Kilmac Energy |
| Dundee United | (Scotland) Gordon Young (interim) | (Republic of Ireland) Seán Dillon | Nike | Calor |
| Hamilton Academical | (Scotland) Martin Canning | (Northern Ireland) Michael McGovern | Adidas | Nevis (H), Scotia Aid (A) |
| Heart of Midlothian | (Scotland) Robbie Neilson | (Turkey) Alim Öztürk | Puma | Save the Children |
| Inverness CT | (Scotland) John Hughes | (Republic of Ireland) Richie Foran | Carbrini | Subway |
| Kilmarnock | (England) Lee Clark | (Republic of Ireland) Mark Connolly | Erreà | QTS |
| Motherwell | (Scotland) Mark McGhee | (Scotland) Keith Lasley | Macron | Cash Converters |
| Partick Thistle | (Scotland) Alan Archibald | (Ghana) Abdul Osman | Joma | Kingsford Capital Management |
| Ross County | (Scotland) Jim McIntyre | (England) Andrew Davies | Carbrini | Stanley CRC Evans Offshore |
| St Johnstone | (Northern Ireland) Tommy Wright | (Scotland) Dave Mackay | Joma | Invest in Perth |

=== Managerial changes ===
| Team | Outgoing manager | Manner of departure | Date of vacancy | Position in table | Incoming manager | Date of appointment |
|---|---|---|---|---|---|---|
| Motherwell | (England) Ian Baraclough | Sacked | 23 September 2015 | 10th | (Scotland) Mark McGhee | 13 October 2015 |
| Dundee United | (Scotland) Jackie McNamara | Sacked | 26 September 2015 | 11th | (Finland) Mixu Paatelainen | 14 October 2015 |
| Kilmarnock | (Scotland) Gary Locke | Resigned | 30 January 2016 | 11th | (Scotland) Lee McCulloch (interim) | 30 January 2016 |
| Kilmarnock | (Scotland) Lee McCulloch | End of interim | 15 February 2016 | 10th | (England) Lee Clark | 15 February 2016 |
| Dundee United | (Finland) Mixu Paatelainen | Sacked | 4 May 2016 | 12th | (Scotland) Gordon Young (interim) | 4 May 2016 |

== Tournament format and regulations ==
=== Basic ===
In the initial phase of the season, the 12 teams will play a round-robin tournament whereby each team plays each one of the other teams three times. After 33 games, the league splits into two sections of six teams, with each team playing each other in that section. The league attempts to balance the fixture list so that teams in the same section play each other twice at home and twice away, but sometimes this is impossible. A total of 228 matches will be played, with 38 matches played by each team.

=== Promotion and relegation ===
Heart of Midlothian were promoted as 2014–15 Scottish Championship winners. On 2 May, bottom club Dundee United were defeated 2–1 away to their city rivals Dundee, a defeat which confined them to relegation of the Championship. Craig Wighton, a local Dundee fan, scored the winning goal in the 92nd minute of the game. The champion of that league will be promoted to the Premiership for the 2016–17 season. The team that finishes 11th in the Premiership will play the winner of the Championship playoffs (teams that finish 2nd, 3rd and 4th in the Championship) in two playoff games, with the winner securing a Premiership spot for the 2016–17 season.

== League table ==
| Pos | Team | Pld | W | D | L | GF | GA | GD | Pts | Qualification or relegation (Note: Teams play each other three times (33 matches), before the league is split into two groups (the top six and the bottom six).) |
|---|---|---|---|---|---|---|---|---|---|---|
| 1 | Celtic (C) | 38 | 26 | 8 | 4 | 93 | 31 | +62 | 86 | Qualification for the Champions League second qualifying round |
| 2 | Aberdeen | 38 | 22 | 5 | 11 | 62 | 48 | +14 | 71 | Qualification for the Europa League first qualifying round |
| 3 | Heart of Midlothian | 38 | 18 | 11 | 9 | 59 | 40 | +19 | 65 | Qualification for the Europa League first qualifying round |
| 4 | St Johnstone | 38 | 16 | 8 | 14 | 58 | 55 | +3 | 56 | |
| 5 | Motherwell | 38 | 15 | 5 | 18 | 47 | 63 | −16 | 50 | |
| 6 | Ross County | 38 | 14 | 6 | 18 | 55 | 61 | −6 | 48 | |
| 7 | Inverness Caledonian Thistle | 38 | 14 | 10 | 14 | 54 | 48 | +6 | 52 | |
| 8 | Dundee | 38 | 11 | 15 | 12 | 53 | 57 | −4 | 48 | |
| 9 | Partick Thistle | 38 | 12 | 10 | 16 | 41 | 50 | −9 | 46 | |
| 10 | Hamilton Academical | 38 | 11 | 10 | 17 | 42 | 63 | −21 | 43 | |
| 11 | Kilmarnock (O) | 38 | 9 | 9 | 20 | 41 | 64 | −23 | 36 | Qualification for the Premiership play-off final |
| 12 | Dundee United (Note: Dundee United were deducted three points for fielding an ineligible player in their win over Inverness Caledonian Thistle on 6 May 2016.) (R) | 38 | 8 | 7 | 23 | 45 | 70 | −25 | 28 | Relegation to the Championship |

Source: SPFL Archive
Rules for classification: 1) Points; 2) Goal difference; 3) Goals scored; 4) Play-off (only if deciding champion, UEFA competitions qualification and second stage group allocation).
(C) Champions; (O) Play-off winners; (R) Relegated

== Results ==
=== Matches 1–22 ===
Teams play each other twice, once at home and once away.

| Home \ Away | ABE | CEL | DND | DUN | HAM | HOM | INV | KIL | MOT | PAR | ROS | STJ |
|---|---|---|---|---|---|---|---|---|---|---|---|---|
| Aberdeen | | 2–1 | 2–0 | 2–0 | 1–0 | 1–0 | 2–2 | 2–0 | 1–1 | 0–0 | 3–1 | 1–5 |
| Celtic | 3–1 | | 6–0 | 5–0 | 8–1 | 0–0 | 4–2 | 0–0 | 1–2 | 1–0 | 2–0 | 3–1 |
| Dundee | 0–2 | 0–0 | | 2–1 | 4–0 | 1–2 | 1–1 | 1–2 | 2–1 | 1–1 | 3–3 | 2–1 |
| Dundee United | 0–1 | 1–3 | 2–2 | | 1–2 | 0–1 | 1–1 | 1–2 | 0–3 | 0–1 | 1–0 | 1–2 |
| Hamilton Academical | 1–1 | 1–2 | 1–1 | 4–0 | | 3–2 | 3–4 | 0–1 | 1–0 | 0–0 | 1–3 | 2–4 |
| Heart of Midlothian | 1–3 | 2–2 | 1–1 | 3–2 | 2–0 | | 2–0 | 1–1 | 2–0 | 3–0 | 2–0 | 4–3 |
| Inverness Caledonian Thistle | 2–1 | 1–3 | 1–1 | 2–2 | 0–2 | 2–0 | | 2–1 | 0–1 | 0–0 | 2–0 | 0–1 |
| Kilmarnock | 0–4 | 2–2 | 0–4 | 1–1 | 1–2 | 2–2 | 2–0 | | 0–1 | 2–5 | 0–4 | 2–1 |
| Motherwell | 1–2 | 0–1 | 3–1 | 0–2 | 3–3 | 2–2 | 1–3 | 1–0 | | 2–1 | 1–1 | 2–0 |
| Partick Thistle | 0–2 | 0–2 | 0–1 | 3–0 | 1–1 | 0–4 | 2–1 | 2–2 | 1–0 | | 1–0 | 2–0 |
| Ross County | 2–0 | 1–4 | 5–2 | 2–1 | 2–0 | 1–2 | 1–2 | 3–2 | 3–0 | 1–0 | | 2–3 |
| St Johnstone | 3–4 | 0–3 | 1–1 | 2–1 | 4–1 | 0–0 | 1–1 | 2–1 | 2–1 | 1–2 | 1–1 | |

Source: Scottish Premiership
Legend: Blue = home team win; Yellow = draw; Red = away team win.

=== Matches 23–33 ===
Teams play every other team once (either at home or away).

| Home \ Away | ABE | CEL | DND | DUN | HAM | HOM | INV | KIL | MOT | PAR | ROS | STJ |
|---|---|---|---|---|---|---|---|---|---|---|---|---|
| Aberdeen | | 2–1 | 1–0 | | 3–0 | | | 2–1 | | | | 1–1 |
| Celtic | | | 0–0 | | | 3–1 | 3–0 | | | | 2–0 | 3–1 |
| Dundee | | | | | | 0–1 | 1–1 | | 2–2 | | 5–2 | 2–0 |
| Dundee United | 0–1 | 1–4 | 2–2 | | | 2–1 | 0–2 | 5–1 | | | | |
| Hamilton Academical | | 1–1 | 2–1 | 0–0 | | 0–0 | | | 0–1 | 1–2 | | |
| Heart of Midlothian | 2–1 | | | | | | | 1–0 | 6–0 | 1–0 | | 0–3 |
| Inverness Caledonian Thistle | 3–1 | | | | 0–1 | 0–0 | | | 1–2 | 0–0 | | |
| Kilmarnock | | 0–1 | 0–0 | | 0–1 | | 2–1 | | | | 0–2 | 3–0 |
| Motherwell | 2–1 | 1–2 | | 2–1 | | | | 0–2 | | 3–1 | 1–2 | |
| Partick Thistle | 1–2 | 1–2 | 2–4 | 1–0 | | | | 0–0 | | | | |
| Ross County | 2–3 | | | 0–3 | 2–1 | 0–3 | 0–3 | | | 1–0 | | |
| St Johnstone | | | | 0–1 | 0–0 | | 1–0 | | 2–1 | 1–2 | 1–1 | |

Source: Scottish Premiership
Legend: Blue = home team win; Yellow = draw; Red = away team win.

=== Matches 34–38 ===
After 33 matches, the league splits into two sections of six teams each, with teams playing every other team in their section once (either at home or away). The exact matches are determined upon the league table at the time of the split.

==== Top six ====
| Home \ Away | ABE | CEL | HOM | MOT | ROS | STJ |
|---|---|---|---|---|---|---|
| Aberdeen | | | 0–1 | 4–1 | 0–4 | |
| Celtic | 3–2 | | | 7–0 | 1–1 | |
| Heart of Midlothian | | 1–3 | | | 1–1 | 2–2 |
| Motherwell | | | 1–0 | | | 1–2 |
| Ross County | | | | 1–3 | | 0–1 |
| St Johnstone | 3–0 | 2–1 | | | | |

Source: Scottish Premiership
Legend: Blue = home team win; Yellow = draw; Red = away team win.

==== Bottom six ====
| Home \ Away | DND | DUN | HAM | INV | KIL | PAR |
|---|---|---|---|---|---|---|
| Dundee | | 2–1 | 0–1 | | 1–1 | |
| Dundee United | | | 1–3 | | | 3–3 |
| Hamilton Academical | | | | 0–1 | 0–4 | |
| Inverness Caledonian Thistle | 4–0 | 2–3 | | | 3–1 | |
| Kilmarnock | | 2–4 | | | | 0–2 |
| Partick Thistle | 1–2 | | 2–2 | 1–4 | | |

Source: Scottish Premiership
Legend: Blue = home team win; Yellow = draw; Red = away team win.

== Top scorers ==
As of matches played on 15 May 2016

| Rank | Player | Club | Goals |
|---|---|---|---|
| 1 | (Scotland) Leigh Griffiths | Celtic | 31 |
| 2 | (England) Kane Hemmings | Dundee | 21 |
| 3 | (Republic of Ireland) Adam Rooney | Aberdeen | 20 |
| 4 | (England) Louis Moult | Motherwell | 15 |
| 4 | (Northern Ireland) Liam Boyce | Ross County | 15 |
| 6 | (Scotland) Kris Doolan | Partick Thistle | 14 |
| 6 | (Scotland) Steven MacLean | St Johnstone | 14 |
| 8 | (Northern Ireland) Billy Mckay | Dundee United | 12 |
| 8 | (Spain) Juanma | Hearts | 12 |
| 10 | (England) Miles Storey | Inverness CT | 11 |

== Awards ==
| Month | Manager of the Month | | Player of the Month | | Ref. |
| Month | Manager | Club | Player | Club | Ref. |
|---|---|---|---|---|---|
| August | (Scotland) Derek McInnes | Aberdeen | (Scotland) Leigh Griffiths | Celtic | |
| September | (Scotland) Derek McInnes | Aberdeen | (Northern Ireland) Niall McGinn | Aberdeen | |
| October | (Norway) Ronny Deila | Celtic | (Scotland) Leigh Griffiths | Celtic | |
| November | (Scotland) Alan Archibald | Partick Thistle | (Scotland) Michael O'Halloran | St Johnstone | |
| December | (Scotland) Mark McGhee | Motherwell | (Northern Ireland) Liam Boyce | Ross County | |
| January | (Norway) Ronny Deila | Celtic | (England) Kane Hemmings | Dundee | |
| February | (Finland) Mixu Paatelainen | Dundee United | (Northern Ireland) Paul Paton | Dundee United | |
| March | (Scotland) Mark McGhee | Motherwell | (Australia) Jackson Irvine | Ross County | |
| April | (Scotland) John Hughes | Inverness CT | (England) Patrick Roberts | Celtic | |

=== Annual awards ===
| Award | Winner | Club |
|---|---|---|
| Ladbrokes Premiership Player of the Year | (Scotland) Leigh Griffiths | Celtic |
| PFA Scotland Premiership Player of the Year | (Scotland) Leigh Griffiths | Celtic |
| PFA Scotland SPFL Young Player of the Year | (Scotland) Kieran Tierney | Celtic |
| PFA Scotland SPFL Manager of the Year | (England) Mark Warburton | Rangers |
| PFA Scotland Goal of the Season | (Scotland) Barrie McKay | Rangers |
| SFWA Player of the Year | (Scotland) Leigh Griffiths | Celtic |

PFA Scotland Team of the Year
| Goalkeeper | (Scotland) Scott Bain (Dundee) | | | |
| Defenders | (England) Shay Logan (Aberdeen) | (Turkey) Alim Öztürk (Heart of Midlothian) | (England) Andrew Davies (Ross County) | (Scotland) Kieran Tierney (Celtic) |
| Midfielders | (Republic of Ireland) Jonny Hayes (Aberdeen) | | (Scotland) Kenny McLean (Aberdeen) | (Scotland) Graeme Shinnie (Aberdeen) |
| Forwards | (England) Kane Hemmings (Dundee) | | (Scotland) Leigh Griffiths (Celtic) | (Scotland) Greg Stewart (Dundee) |

== Premiership play-offs ==
The quarter-finals were contested between the 3rd and 4th placed teams in the Scottish Championship; Hibernian and Raith Rovers. Hibernian, the winners, advanced to the semi-finals to face the 2nd placed team in the Championship; Falkirk. Falkirk, the winners, advanced to the final to play-off against the 11th placed team in the Premiership, Kilmarnock, with the winners securing a place in the 2016–17 Scottish Premiership.

Quarter-final
3 | Hibernian | 0 | 2 | 2
4 | Raith Rovers | 1 | 0 | 1

Semi-final
2 | Falkirk | 2 | 3 | 5
3 | Hibernian | 2 | 2 | 4

Final
1 | Kilmarnock | 0 | 4 | 4
2 | Falkirk | 1 | 0 | 1

=== Quarter-final ===
==== First leg ====
| 4 May 2016 | Raith Rovers | 1–0 | Hibernian | Stark's Park, Kirkcaldy |
| 19:45 | Panayiotou 75' | BBC Report | | Attendance: 5,330; Referee: Kevin Clancy |

==== Second leg ====
| 7 May 2016 | Hibernian | 2–0 (2–1 agg.) | Raith Rovers | Easter Road, Edinburgh |
| 12:30 | McGinn 8'; McGregor 12' | BBC Report | | Attendance: 11,133; Referee: John McKendrick |

=== Semi-final ===
==== First leg ====
| 10 May 2016 | Hibernian | 2–2 | Falkirk | Easter Road, Edinburgh |
| 19:45 | Henderson 57'; McGregor 66' | BBC Report | Miller 34'; McHugh 80' | Attendance: 11,830; Referee: Alan Muir |

==== Second leg ====
| 13 May 2016 | Falkirk | 3–2 (5–4 agg.) | Hibernian | Falkirk Stadium, Falkirk |
| 19:45 | Alston 13'; Leahy 79'; McHugh 90' | BBC Report | Keatings 31' (pen.), 34' | Attendance: 7,851; Referee: Craig Thomson |

=== Final ===
==== First leg ====
| 19 May 2016 | Falkirk | 1–0 | Kilmarnock | Falkirk Stadium, Falkirk |
| 19:45 | Vaulks 90+1' | BBC Report | | Attendance: 7,636; Referee: John Beaton |

==== Second leg ====
| 22 May 2016 | Kilmarnock | 4–0 (4–1 agg.) | Falkirk | Rugby Park, Kilmarnock |
| 15:00 | Kiltie 3', 62'; Addison 8'; Boyd 65' | BBC Report | | Attendance: 11,013; Referee: Willie Collum |

== Attendances ==
Celtic FC drew the highest average home attendance in the 2015–16 edition of the Scottish Premiership.

| # | Football club | Home games | Average attendance |
|---|---|---|---|
| 1 | Celtic FC | 19 | 44,850 |
| 2 | Heart of Midlothian | 19 | 16,423 |
| 3 | Aberdeen FC | 19 | 13,094 |
| 4 | Dundee United | 19 | 7,969 |
| 5 | Dundee FC | 19 | 6,122 |
| 6 | Motherwell FC | 19 | 4,912 |
| 7 | Ross County FC | 19 | 4,034 |
| 8 | Kilmarnock FC | 19 | 3,993 |
| 9 | St. Johnstone FC | 19 | 3,880 |
| 10 | Partick Thistle FC | 19 | 3,800 |
| 11 | Inverness Caledonian Thistle | 19 | 3,754 |
| 12 | Hamilton Academical FC | 19 | 3,027 |

== See also ==
- Nine in a row
