= Elliot Ford =

Scottish footballer

Personal information
- Date of birth: 26 May 1996 (age 30)
- Place of birth: Kirkcaldy, Scotland
- Positions: Defender; midfielder

Team information
- Current team: Fife Council

Youth career
- 2008–2009: Rangers
- 2009–2014: Hearts
- 2014–2015: Raith Rovers

Senior career*
Years	Team	Apps	(Gls)
2015–2016	Raith Rovers	1	(0)
2016–2017	Brechin City	28	(1)
2017–2019	Kelty Hearts	49	(2)
2019–	Thornton Hibs	0	(0)

International career
2013	Scotland U17	1	(0)
- * Club domestic league appearances and goals

Elliot Ford (born 26 May 1996) is a Scottish professional footballer who plays for East Region Super League club Thornton Hibs as a defender and attacking midfielder. Since retiring due to falling out of love with the game he has since gone onto find a new passion of fixing boilers for his beloved Fife Council.

Ford has previously played for Rangers and Hearts at youth level and Raith Rovers and Brechin City at senior level.

Ford has represented Scotland at under-17 whilst a member of Hearts.

== Background ==
Ford was born in Kirkcaldy and grew up in nearby Glenrothes, where he attended Auchmuty High School.

== Club career ==
=== Rangers ===
Ford began his career at local boys club team St.Johns before embarking on his professional career in the youth ranks at Rangers. Ford spent the first year of his professional youth career with the Glasgow club at Under 13 Level.

=== Heart of Midlothian ===
Following Ford's departure from the club at the age of 12, he went on to join Edinburgh club Hearts, where he would spend the majority of his youth career. During his period at the club, Ford was a member of the squad that reached the 2013/14 Scottish youth cup final. Ford progressed through the youth system before signing his first professional contract and becoming a member of the clubs under 20 development team.

=== Raith Rovers ===
Following the club's financial difficulties at the end of the 2013/14 season, Ford moved to hometown club Raith Rovers. Ford spent the next two seasons at the club where he would make his professional debut in a Scottish Challenge Cup match against Cowdenbeath.

=== Brechin City ===
Following his departure at the close of the 2015/16 season, Ford signed for Scottish League One team Brechin City following a successful trial period. Ford went on to make his debut for the club in a Scottish League Cup match against Elgin City. Ford was a key member of the Brechin side that went on to win promotion to the Scottish Championship for the first time in 11 years, defeating and relegating his former side Raith Rovers in the semi-final fixtures, and Alloa Athletic in the Championship play-offs final. Ford scored his first goal for the club in the Championship play-offs final first leg against Alloa Athletic in a 1-0 victory.

Following on from the playoff success, Ford extended his contract at the club for the following season when Brechin City competed in the second tier of the Scottish Professional Football League for the first time since 2006 and, the club's first appearance in the Scottish Championship since its re-branding in 2013.

=== Kelty Hearts ===
Ford moved early in the 2017–18 season following appearances in the Scottish League Cup and Scottish Championship in search of more regular first team football. A successful short loan spell at the Fife club lead to a permanent move, with Ford signing a two-year deal with the club in the January transfer window.

=== Thornton Hibs ===
Ford moved to East Region Junior side Thornton Hibs in August 2019. He looks forward to playing for his local side in the East Region South Super League. 'It's good to be a hibby'

== International career ==
Ford was selected for the under-17 national team squad in 2013 where he made his international debut in a friendly match against Northern Ireland under-17.

== Career statistics ==
As of 19 August 2019

Appearances and goals by club, season and competition
Club	Season	League			National Cup		League Cup		Other		Total	
Club	Season	Division	Apps	Goals	Apps	Goals	Apps	Goals	Apps	Goals	Apps	Goals
Raith Rovers	2015–16 season	Scottish Championship	0	0	0	0	0	0	1	0	1	0
Total			0	0	0	0	0	0	1	0	1	0
Brechin City	2016–17 season	Scottish League One	17	0	1	0	2	0	6	1	26	1
Brechin City	2017–18 season	Scottish Championship	1	0	0	0	1	0	0	0	2	0
Total			18	0	1	0	3	0	6	1	29	1
Kelty Hearts	2017–18 season	East of Scotland Football League	17	1	0	0	3	0	4	0	24	1
Kelty Hearts	2018-19 season	Lowland League	21	0	2	0	0	0	2	1	25	1
Total			38	1	2	0	3	0	6	1	49	2
Thornton Hibs	2019–20 season	Scottish Junior Football East Region Super League	0	0	0	0	0	0	0	0	0	0
Total			0	0	0	0	0	0	0	0	0	0
Career total			56	1	3	0	6	0	13	2	79	3

== Honours ==
=== Club ===
Brechin City

- Scottish Championship Play-offs: 2016–17

Kelty Hearts

- East of Scotland Football League: 2017–18
- Lowland League Play-offs Winner: 2017–18
