= Harry Panayiotou =

Saint Kitts and Nevis footballer (born 1994)

Personal information
- Full name: Harrison Andreas Panayiotou
- Date of birth: 28 October 1994 (age 32)
- Place of birth: Leicester, England
- Height: 5 ft 10 in (1.78 m)
- Position: Forward

Team information
- Current team: Hemel Hempstead Town

Youth career
- 2009–2012: Leicester City

Senior career*
Years	Team	Apps	(Gls)
2012–2016	Leicester City	1	(1)
2014	→ Port Vale (loan)	0	(0)
2016	→ Raith Rovers (loan)	14	(1)
2016–2018	Barrow	33	(2)
2017	→ Salford City (loan)	3	(0)
2018–2019	Nuneaton Borough	20	(0)
2019	Aittitos Spata	2	(0)
2019–2021	Aldershot Town	66	(16)
2021–2022	Livingston	4	(0)
2022–2023	Aldershot Town	28	(1)
2023	→ Maidenhead United (loan)	6	(0)
2023–2024	FCB Magpies	8	(2)
2024	Sirens	13	(1)
2025	Larne	2	(0)
2025–2026	Morecambe	15	(0)
2026–	Hemel Hempstead Town	1	(1)

International career^{‡}
2015	Saint Kitts and Nevis U23	3	(3)
2014–	Saint Kitts and Nevis	47	(14)
Medal record
Men's football
Representing Saint Kitts and Nevis
FIFA Series
Bronze medal – third place	2026 Indonesia
- * Club domestic league appearances and goals as of 14 September 2026 ‡ National team caps and goals as of 17 November 2026

Harrison Andreas Panayiotou (Greek: Χάρρισον Ανδρέας Παναγιώτου; born 28 October 1994) is a professional footballer who plays as a forward for National League South club Hemel Hempstead Town. Born in England, he represents the Saint Kitts and Nevis national team, having made his international debut in 2014.

Panayiotou joined his hometown club Leicester City as a youngster, making his first-team debut in April 2012. After loan spells at Port Vale in October 2014 and Raith Rovers in the second half of the 2015–16 season, he was released by Leicester. He joined Barrow in September 2016 and was loaned to Salford City in March 2017. He signed with Nuneaton Borough in June 2018 before moving on to the Greek side Aittitos Spata in January 2019.

Panayiotou returned to the English National League with Aldershot Town in July 2019. After two seasons there, he joined Scottish Premiership side Livingston for a short spell but returned to Aldershot Town in January 2022. He joined Maidenhead United on loan in February 2023. He joined Gibraltar club Bruno's Magpies in August 2023 and moved to Maltese Premier League side Sirens the following year. He signed with Larne of Northern Ireland in January 2025, and returned to England eight months later to join Morecambe. He signed with Hemel Hempstead Town in September 2026.

== Club career ==
=== Leicester City ===
Panayiotou was born in Leicester, to a Greek Cypriot father, Andreas, who was involved in youth football, and a Kittian mother. He started his career at the youth academy of local club Leicester City, alongside subsequent first-team teammates Andy King, Jeffrey Schlupp, Liam Moore, Tom Parkes and Cian Bolger. His performances for the under-18 side earned him the Fans' Academy Player of the Year award for the 2011–12 season. He was part of the youth squad which won the HKFC Soccer Sevens cup in May 2013, where he scored five goals, including one in the 2–0 win over Newcastle United in the final; he was subsequently named Player of the Tournament.

After impressing in games for Leicester City Under-21 he was named as the under-21 Premier League Player of the Month for March. On 18 May 2015, Panayiotou was named Leicester City Under-21 Player of the Year, reward for an impressive season including scoring 11 goals in his last 13 games. He made his senior debut for the "Foxes" against Leeds United on the final day of the 2011–12 season at Elland Road; he replaced Lloyd Dyer in the 73rd minute and scored the winning goal in added time. He signed his first professional contract in September 2012, and in July 2014 he extended it by a further two years. On 20 October 2014, Panayioutou joined League One side Port Vale on a one-month loan. However, he did not make a first-team appearance for the "Valiants" during his time at Vale Park.

On 29 January 2016, Panayiotou joined Scottish Championship club Raith Rovers on loan until the end of the 2015–16 season. He made his league debut for Raith against Rangers on 2 February, coming on as a second-half substitute. He scored his first goal for Rovers in a 3–3 draw against with Rangers on 2 April. His next goal came in the Scottish Championship semi-final first leg play-off against Hibernian at Stark's Park on 4 May 2016; Rovers went on to lose 2–0 (2–1 on aggregate) in the return leg three days later. He was released by Leicester City at the end of the 2015–16 season.

=== Barrow ===
Following a trial at Carlisle United, Panayiotou cut short a trial at Borussia Dortmund's under-23 team to sign a two-year contract with National League side Barrow in September 2016; "Bluebirds" manager Paul Cox said that "he had offers from Yeovil and Coventry and even from Salt Lake City in America, but he wanted to play here for us". He made his debut for Barrow in an FA Trophy replay against Harrogate Town on 13 December 2016. On 23 March 2017, he joined National League North side Salford City on loan until the end of the 2016–17 season. He played three games for the "Ammies".

Back with Barrow for the 2017–18 season he chose to turn down his country to help Adrian Pennock's side battle against relegation. It was reported in December that his "displays since Ady Pennock arrived have been key to the club's resurgence". The battle proved successful as Barrow finished one place and one point above the relegation zone.

=== Nuneaton Borough ===
On 25 June 2018, Panayiotou signed with National League North side Nuneaton Borough in a move that reunited him with former Leicester City youth coach Nicky Eaden. He made 20 appearances for "Boro" in the first half of the 2018–19 season, before he departed Liberty Way on 23 January 2019.

=== Aittitos Spata ===
In January 2019, Panayiotou signed for Greek Football League side Aittitos Spata. The "Invincible" were relegated at the end of the 2018–19 season after being expelled for financial problems.

=== Aldershot Town ===
On 12 July 2019, Panayiotou joined National League side Aldershot Town after a successful trial spell. He scored four goals in 30 appearances for the "Shots" in the 2019–20 season, which was permanently suspended on 26 March due to the COVID-19 pandemic in England, with Aldershot in 16th-place. He scored 12 goals from 37 appearances in the 2020–21 season, finishing as the "Shots" joint-top goalscorer.

=== Livingston ===
On 12 August 2021, Panayiotou signed a two-year deal with an option for a third year with Scottish Premiership club Livingston. He made his debut at the Almondvale Stadium in the Scottish League Cup on 14 August, coming on as a 67th-minute substitute only to be substituted himself eleven minutes later in what ended as a 1–1 draw with St Mirren; manager David Martindale said after the game that it was a mistake to play Panayiotou as he was not fit. He made his Premiership debut in a 0–0 draw with Celtic on 30 October. He made just four substitute appearances in the league for the "Lions" and his contract was mutually terminated in January 2022. Panayiotou said there was a "toxic" environment at the club.

=== Return to Aldershot ===
On 5 January 2022, Panayiotou returned to Aldershot Town on a free transfer, signing an 18-month deal. He said it was a "no-brainer" to return to the Recreation Ground and said manager Mark Molesley had "amazing" tactical awareness and knowledge. He scored one goal in 15 appearances in the second half of the 2021–22 season. On 17 February 2023, Panayiotou joined league rivals Maidenhead United on a one-month loan. This deal was then extended until the end of the season. He featured 17 times for Aldershot and six times for Maidenhead during the 2022–23 season, with both clubs successfully avoiding relegation. He was released by Aldershot at the end of the season.

=== Later career ===
After a spell playing in Gibraltar for Bruno's Magpies, Panayiotou joined Maltese Premier League side Sirens in January 2024, making his debut in a defeat to Valletta. He scored one goal from 13 games in the 2023–24 season.

Panayiotou signed a short-term deal with NIFL Premiership side Larne on 13 January 2025. He said he was "here to win trophies". He played two games in the remainder of the 2024–25 season.

On 20 August 2025, Panayiotou signed for National League club Morecambe. Morecambe were relegated at the end of the 2025–26 season, and he was released upon the expiry of his contract.

On 11 September 2026, Panayiotou signed for National League South side Hemel Hempstead Town. The following day, he made his debut as a half-time substitute against Tonbridge Angels, scoring the equaliser in a 1–1 draw.

== International career ==
On 8 October 2014, Panayiotou scored on his debut for Saint Kitts and Nevis in their Caribbean Cup qualifying defeat to Barbados at Stade Sylvio Cator in Port-au-Prince, Haiti.

On 26 March 2015, he scored a hat-trick beginning with a penalty in the second leg of a World Cup first qualifying round tie against the Turks and Caicos Islands at the TCIFA National Academy in Providenciales; Saint Kitts and Nevis won the match 6–2 for a 12–4 aggregate victory. On 26 March 2016, he scored in a 2–0 win over Aruba which secured passage into the second round of qualification for the 2017 Caribbean Cup. This also meant he broke an 85-year Leicester City club record previously held by England's Ernie Hine – the Foxes' all-time leading goalscorer at international level. On 30 March 2026, he scored in a 4–2 win over the Solomon Islands in the third place play-off match of the 2026 FIFA Series.

== Career statistics ==
=== Club ===
As of match played 12 September 2026

Appearances and goals by club, season and competition
Club	Season	League			National cup (Note: Includes FA Cup, Scottish Cup, Greek Cup, Rock Cup, Maltese FA Trophy, Irish Cup)		League cup (Note: Includes Football League Cup, Scottish League Cup, Northern Ireland Football League Cup)		Other		Total	
Club	Season	Division	Apps	Goals	Apps	Goals	Apps	Goals	Apps	Goals	Apps	Goals
Leicester City	2011–12	Championship	1	1	0	0	0	0	—		1	1
Leicester City	2012–13	Championship	0	0	0	0	0	0	0	0	0	0
Leicester City	2013–14	Championship	0	0	0	0	0	0	—		0	0
Leicester City	2014–15	Premier League	0	0	0	0	0	0	—		0	0
Leicester City	2015–16	Premier League	0	0	0	0	0	0	—		0	0
Leicester City	Total		1	1	0	0	0	0	0	0	1	1
Port Vale (loan)	2014–15	League One	0	0	0	0	—		—		0	0
Raith Rovers (loan)	2015–16	Scottish Championship	14	1	—		—		2 (Note: Appearance(s) in play-offs)	1	16	2
Barrow	2016–17	National League	1	0	0	0	—		2 (Note: Appearance(s) in FA Trophy)	0	3	0
Barrow	2017–18	National League	32	2	0	0	—		2	0	34	2
Barrow	Total		33	2	0	0	0	0	4	0	37	2
Salford City (loan)	2016–17	National League North	3	0	0	0	—		0	0	3	0
Nuneaton Borough	2018–19	National League North	20	0	0	0	—		3 (Note: Appearances in Birmingham Senior Cup and FA Trophy)	0	23	0
Aittitos Spata	2018–19	Greek Football League	2	0	0	0	—		0	0	2	0
Aldershot Town	2019–20	National League	29	4	1	0	—		0	0	30	4
Aldershot Town	2020–21	National League	37	12	0	0	—		0	0	37	12
Aldershot Town	Total		66	16	1	0	0	0	0	0	67	16
Livingston	2021–22	Scottish Premiership	4	0	0	0	1	0	—		5	0
Aldershot Town	2021–22	National League	14	1	—		—		1	0	15	1
Aldershot Town	2022–23	National League	14	0	1	0	—		2	1	17	1
Aldershot Town	Total		28	1	1	0	0	0	3	1	32	2
Maidenhead United (loan)	2022–23	National League	6	0	—		—		0	0	6	0
FCB Magpies	2023–24	Gibraltar Football League	8	2	0	0	—		1 (Note: Appearance in Pepe Reyes Cup)	0	9	2
Sirens	2023–24	Maltese Premier League	13	1	1	0	—		0	0	14	1
Larne	2024–25	NIFL Premiership	2	0	0	0	0	0	0	0	2	0
Morecambe	2025–26	National League	15	0	—		—		0	0	15	0
Hemel Hempstead Town	2026–27	National League South	1	1	0	0	—		0	0	1	1
Career total			216	25	3	0	1	0	13	2	233	27

=== International ===
As of match played 17 November 2026

Appearances and goals by national team and year
National team	Year	Apps	Goals
Saint Kitts and Nevis	2014	2	1
Saint Kitts and Nevis	2015	6	3
Saint Kitts and Nevis	2016	6	3
Saint Kitts and Nevis	2017	2	0
Saint Kitts and Nevis	2018	4	3
Saint Kitts and Nevis	2019	5	0
Saint Kitts and Nevis	2021	4	0
Saint Kitts and Nevis	2023	5	1
Saint Kitts and Nevis	2024	4	1
Saint Kitts and Nevis	2025	1	0
Saint Kitts and Nevis	2026	8	2
Total		47	14

Scores and results list Saint Kitts and Nevis' goal tally first, score column indicates score after each Panayiotou goal.

List of international goals scored by Harry Panayiotou
No.	Date	Venue	Opponent	Score	Result	Competition
1	8 October 2014	Stade Sylvio Cator, Port-au-Prince, Haiti	Barbados	2–3	2–3	2014 Caribbean Cup qualification
2	26 March 2015	TCIFA National Academy, Providenciales, Turks and Caicos Islands	Turks and Caicos Islands	3–2	6–2	2018 FIFA World Cup qualification
3	26 March 2015	TCIFA National Academy, Providenciales, Turks and Caicos Islands	Turks and Caicos Islands	4–2	6–2	2018 FIFA World Cup qualification
4	26 March 2015	TCIFA National Academy, Providenciales, Turks and Caicos Islands	Turks and Caicos Islands	5–2	6–2	2018 FIFA World Cup qualification
5	26 March 2016	Trinidad Stadium, Oranjestad, Aruba	Aruba	2–0	2–0	2017 Caribbean Cup qualification
6	29 March 2016	Warner Park Stadium, Basseterre, Saint Kitts and Nevis	Antigua and Barbuda	1–0	1–0	2017 Caribbean Cup qualification
7	1 June 2016	Warner Park Stadium, Basseterre, Saint Kitts and Nevis	Suriname	1–0	1–0	2017 Caribbean Cup qualification
8	9 September 2018	Warner Park Stadium, Basseterre, Saint Kitts and Nevis	Puerto Rico	1–0	1–0	2019–20 CONCACAF Nations League qualification
9	14 October 2018	Raymond E. Guishard Technical Centre, The Valley, Anguilla	Saint Martin	4–0	10–0	2019–20 CONCACAF Nations League qualification
10	14 October 2018	Raymond E. Guishard Technical Centre, The Valley, Anguilla	Saint Martin	9–0	10–0	2019–20 CONCACAF Nations League qualification
11	23 March 2023	Raymond E. Guishard Technical Centre, The Valley, Anguilla	Saint Martin	3–1	3–1	2022–23 CONCACAF Nations League C
12	20 March 2024	San Marino Stadium, Serravalle, San Marino	San Marino	3–1	3–1	Friendly
13	30 March 2026	Gelora Bung Karno Stadium, Jakarta, Indonesia	Solomon Islands	4–2	4–2	2026 FIFA Series
14	17 November 2026	Estadio La Polar, Havana, Cuba	Bonaire	1–2	3–2	2026–27 CONCACAF Nations League

== Honours ==
Saint Kitts and Nevis

- FIFA Series third place: 2026
