= 2016–17 Scottish Championship =

Ladbrokes Championship
- Season: 2016–17
- Champions: Hibernian
- Promoted: Hibernian
- Relegated: Ayr United; Raith Rovers
- Matches: 180
- Goals: 469 (2.61 per match)
- Top goalscorer: Jason Cummings; Stephen Dobbie (19 goals)
- Biggest home win: St Mirren 5–0 Raith Rovers (29 April 2017)
- Biggest away win: Queen of the South 0–5 Greenock Morton (15 October 2016)
- Highest scoring: Ayr United 4–4 Dumbarton (24 December 2016); St Mirren 6–2 Ayr United (1 April 2017)
- Longest winning run: 5 matches: Dundee United; Hibernian; Queen of the South
- Longest unbeaten run: 12 matches: Dundee United
- Longest winless run: 15 matches: Ayr United; Raith Rovers
- Longest losing run: 7 matches: Queen of the South
- Highest attendance: 19,764; Hibernian 1–1 St Mirren (6 May 2017)
- Lowest attendance: 600; Dumbarton 0–0 Raith Rovers (19 November 2016)
- Total attendance: 808,085
- Average attendance: 4,489 (2,908)
- All statistics correct as of 7 May 2017.

The 2016–17 Scottish Championship (known as the Ladbrokes Championship for sponsorship reasons) was the 23rd season in the current format of 10 teams in the second tier of Scottish football. The fixtures were published on 17 June 2016.

Hibernian won the league title and promotion after a 3–0 win against Queen of the South on 15 April 2017.

== Teams ==
The following teams have changed division since the 2015–16 season.

=== To Championship ===
Promoted from Scottish League One

- Dunfermline Athletic
- Ayr United

Relegated from Scottish Premiership

- Dundee United

=== From Championship ===
Relegated to Scottish League One

- Alloa Athletic
- Livingston

Promoted to Scottish Premiership

- Rangers

=== Stadia and locations ===
Ayr United	Dumbarton	Dundee United	Dunfermline Athletic
Somerset Park	Dumbarton Football Stadium	Tannadice Park	East End Park
Capacity: 10,185	Capacity: 2,020	Capacity: 14,223	Capacity: 11,904
Falkirk	2016–17 Scottish Championship is located in Scotland South		Greenock Morton
Falkirk Stadium	2016–17 Scottish Championship is located in Scotland South		Cappielow Park
Capacity: 7,937	2016–17 Scottish Championship is located in Scotland South		Capacity: 11,589
Hibernian	Queen of the South	Raith Rovers	St. Mirren
Easter Road	Palmerston Park	Stark's Park	Paisley 2021 Stadium
Capacity: 20,421	Capacity: 8,690	Capacity: 9,031	Capacity: 8,023

=== Personnel and kits ===
Team	Manager	Captain	Kit manufacturer	Shirt sponsor
Ayr United	(Scotland) Ian McCall	(Scotland) Nicky Devlin	Adidas	Bodog
Dumbarton	(Scotland) Stephen Aitken	(Scotland) Darren Barr	Joma	Turnberry Homes
Dundee United	(Scotland) Ray McKinnon	(Republic of Ireland) Seán Dillon	Nike	McEwan Fraser Legal
Dunfermline Athletic	(Scotland) Allan Johnston	(Scotland) Andy Geggan	Joma	SRJ Windows
Falkirk	(Scotland) Peter Houston	(Scotland) Mark Kerr	Puma	Central Demolition
Greenock Morton	(Scotland) Jim Duffy	(Scotland) Lee Kilday	Vision Outsourcing	Millions
Hibernian	(Northern Ireland) Neil Lennon	(Scotland) David Gray	Nike	Marathonbet
Queen of the South	(Scotland) Gary Naysmith	(Scotland) John Rankin	Macron	KBT Pharmacy
Raith Rovers	(Scotland) John Hughes	(Scotland) Jason Thomson	Puma	valmcdermid.com (Home shirt); Myeloma UK (Away shirt)
St Mirren	(Scotland) Jack Ross	(Scotland) Stephen McGinn	Carbrini	JD Sports

=== Managerial changes ===
Team	Outgoing manager	Manner of departure	Date of vacancy	Position in table	Incoming manager	Date of appointment
Dundee United	(Finland) Mixu Paatelainen	Sacked	4 May 2016	Pre-season	(Scotland) Ray McKinnon	12 May 2016
Raith Rovers	(Scotland) Ray McKinnon	Resigned	11 May 2016	Pre-season	(Scotland) Gary Locke	20 May 2016
Hibernian	(England) Alan Stubbs	Signed by Rotherham United	1 June 2016	Pre-season	(Northern Ireland) Neil Lennon	8 June 2016
St Mirren	(Scotland) Alex Rae	Sacked	18 September 2016	10th	(Scotland) Allan McManus (interim)	18 September 2016
St Mirren	(Scotland) Allan McManus (interim)	End of interim	4 October 2016	10th	(Scotland) Jack Ross	4 October 2016
Queen of the South	(England) Gavin Skelton	Resigned	7 November 2016	6th	(Scotland) Jim Thomson (caretaker)	7 November 2016
Queen of the South	(Scotland) Jim Thomson (caretaker)	End of interim	5 December 2016	6th	(Scotland) Gary Naysmith	5 December 2016
Raith Rovers	(Scotland) Gary Locke	Sacked	7 February 2017	8th	(Scotland) John Hughes	10 February 2017

== League summary ==
=== League table ===
Pos	Team	Pld	W	D	L	GF	GA	GD	Pts	Promotion, qualification or relegation
1	Hibernian (C, P)	36	19	14	3	59	25	+34	71	Promotion to Premiership
2	Falkirk	36	16	12	8	58	40	+18	60	Qualification for the Premiership play-off semi-finals
3	Dundee United	36	15	12	9	50	42	+8	57	Qualification for the Premiership play-off quarter-finals
4	Greenock Morton	36	13	13	10	44	41	+3	52	Qualification for the Premiership play-off quarter-finals
5	Dunfermline Athletic	36	12	12	12	46	43	+3	48	
6	Queen of the South	36	11	10	15	46	52	−6	43	
7	St Mirren	36	9	12	15	52	56	−4	39	
8	Dumbarton	36	9	12	15	46	56	−10	39	
9	Raith Rovers (R)	36	10	9	17	35	52	−17	39	Qualification for the Championship play-offs
10	Ayr United (R)	36	7	12	17	33	62	−29	33	Relegation to League One

Source: Soccerway
Rules for classification: 1) Points; 2) Goal difference; 3) Number of goals scored
(C) Champions; (P) Promoted; (R) Relegated

=== Positions by round ===
Leader - Promotion to 2017–18 Scottish Premiership
Qualification to Premiership play-off semi-finals
Qualification to Premiership play-off quarter-finals
Qualification to Championship play-offs
Relegation to 2017–18 Scottish League One

The table lists the positions of teams after each week of matches. In order to preserve chronological progress, any postponed matches are not included in the round at which they were originally scheduled, but added to the full round they were played immediately afterwards. For example, if a match is scheduled for matchday 13, but then postponed and played between days 16 and 17, it will be added to the standings for day 16.

Team ╲ Round	1	2	3	4	5	6	7	8	9	10	11	12	13	14	15	16	17	18	19	20	21	22	23	24	25	26	27	28	29	30	31	32	33	34	35	36
Hibernian	3	2	2	1	1	2	2	2	1	1	1	1	1	1	1	1	1	2	1	1	1	1	1	1	1	1	1	1	1	1	1	1	1	1	1	1
Falkirk	9	7	8	6	5	4	3	3	3	5	5	5	5	5	3	3	3	4	4	4	4	4	3	3	3	2	2	2	2	2	2	2	2	2	2	2
Dundee United	4	8	4	4	4	5	5	5	4	2	2	2	2	2	2	2	2	1	2	2	2	2	2	2	2	3	4	4	4	4	4	4	3	3	3	3
Greenock Morton	5	6	6	8	9	7	8	6	6	7	6	4	3	3	4	4	4	3	3	3	3	3	4	4	4	4	3	3	3	3	3	3	4	4	4	4
Dunfermline Athletic	2	4	7	7	8	9	7	8	8	8	8	9	9	8	9	7	7	7	6	6	5	6	6	6	6	6	6	6	7	6	6	6	5	5	5	5
Queen of the South	6	3	3	3	2	1	1	1	2	3	4	6	6	6	6	6	6	6	7	7	7	5	5	5	5	5	5	5	5	5	5	5	6	6	6	6
St Mirren	7	9	9	9	10	10	10	10	10	10	10	10	10	10	10	10	10	10	10	10	10	10	10	10	10	10	10	10	10	10	10	9	8	9	8	7
Dumbarton	8	5	5	5	6	8	9	9	9	9	9	8	8	9	8	9	8	8	8	8	8	8	7	7	7	8	7	7	8	8	7	7	9	7	7	8
Raith Rovers	1	1	1	2	3	3	4	4	5	4	3	3	4	4	5	5	5	5	5	5	6	7	8	8	8	7	8	8	6	7	8	8	7	8	9	9
Ayr United	10	10	10	10	7	6	6	7	7	6	7	7	7	7	7	8	9	9	9	9	9	9	9	9	9	9	9	9	9	9	9	10	10	10	10	10

Updated to match(es) played on 6 May 2017. Source:

== Results ==
Teams play each other four times, twice in the first half of the season (home and away) and twice in the second half of the season (home and away), making a total of 180 games, with each team playing 36.

=== First half of season ===
Home \ Away	AYR	DUM	DUN	DNF	FAL	GMO	HIB	QOS	RAI	STM
Ayr United		4–4	0–1	0–0	0–1	2–1	0–3	1–0	0–2	1–1
Dumbarton	0–3		1–0	2–2	2–1	0–2	0–1	0–0	0–0	1–1
Dundee United	3–0	2–1		1–0	1–0	2–1	1–0	1–1	2–2	2–1
Dunfermline Athletic	1–1	4–3	1–3		1–1	2–1	1–3	0–1	0–0	4–3
Falkirk	2–0	1–0	3–1	2–1		1–1	1–2	2–2	2–4	3–1
Greenock Morton	2–1	1–1	0–0	2–1	1–1		1–1	1–0	1–0	3–1
Hibernian	1–2	2–0	1–1	2–1	1–1	4–0		4–0	1–1	2–0
Queen of the South	4–1	1–2	1–4	2–2	2–0	0–5	0–0		3–1	2–3
Raith Rovers	1–1	3–2	0–0	2–0	0–2	0–1	0–0	1–0		3–1
St Mirren	1–1	0–1	0–2	0–1	1–1	1–1	0–2	1–3	1–0	

Updated to match(es) played on 7 February 2017. Source: Scottish Championship
Legend: Blue = home team win; Yellow = draw; Red = away team win.

=== Second half of season ===
Home \ Away	AYR	DUM	DUN	DNF	FAL	GMO	HIB	QOS	RAI	STM
Ayr United		2–1	0–0	0–2	1–4	1–4	0–4	0–2	1–0	0–2
Dumbarton	2–2		1–0	0–2	0–1	1–0	0–1	1–2	4–0	2–2
Dundee United	2–1	2–2		1–0	1–1	1–1	0–1	3–3	3–0	3–2
Dunfermline Athletic	0–1	5–1	1–1		1–2	3–1	1–1	1–1	1–0	1–1
Falkirk	1–1	2–2	3–0	2–0		0–1	1–2	2–2	1–0	2–2
Greenock Morton	1–1	2–1	1–1	0–1	2–2		1–1	1–0	2–0	1–4
Hibernian	1–1	2–2	3–0	2–2	2–1	0–0		3–0	3–2	1–1
Queen of the South	0–0	1–2	4–2	0–1	0–2	3–0	0–1		2–1	0–2
Raith Rovers	2–1	1–3	2–1	0–2	1–4	2–0	1–1	1–1		2–0
St Mirren	6–2	1–1	3–2	0–0	1–2	1–1	2–0	0–3	5–0	

Updated to match(es) played on 6 May 2017. Source: Scottish Championship
Legend: Blue = home team win; Yellow = draw; Red = away team win.

== Season statistics ==
=== Scoring ===
==== Top scorers ====
As of matches played on 6 May 2017

Rank	Player	Club	Goals
1	(Australia) Jason Cummings	Hibernian	19
1	(Scotland) Stephen Dobbie	Queen of the South	19
3	(Scotland) Nicky Clark	Dunfermline Athletic	15
4	(France) Tony Andreu	Dundee United	13
5	(Scotland) Robert Thomson	Dumbarton	11
6	(Scotland) Simon Murray	Dundee United	10
6	(Scotland) Craig Sibbald	Falkirk	10
6	(Scotland) Derek Lyle	Queen of the South	10
9	(Scotland) Lee Miller	Falkirk	9
9	(Scotland) Ross Forbes	Greenock Morton	9
9	(Scotland) Ryan Hardie	Raith Rovers ^{[note 1]}	9

^{note 1} 3 league goals scored whilst on loan with St Mirren

==== Hat-tricks ====
Player	For	Against	Result	Date	Ref
(England) Joe Cardle	Dunfermline Athletic	Dumbarton	4–3	6 August 2016	
(Scotland) Alan Forrest	Ayr United	Dumbarton	3–0	15 October 2016	
(Scotland) Nicky Clark^{4}	Dunfermline Athletic	Dumbarton	5–1	4 March 2017	
(Scotland) Stevie Mallan	St Mirren	Raith Rovers	5–0	29 April 2017	

Notes

- ^{4} Player scored 4 goals

=== Discipline ===
==== Player ====
===== Yellow cards =====
As of matches played on 6 May 2017

Rank	Player	Club	Cards
1	(France) William Edjenguélé	Dundee United	11
1	(Scotland) Iain Davidson	Raith Rovers	11
1	(Scotland) Declan McManus	Raith Rovers	11
4	(England) Kallum Higginbotham	Dunfermline Athletic	10
4	(Northern Ireland) Jamie McDonagh	Greenock Morton	10
6	(Scotland) Gregor Buchanan	Dumbarton	9
6	(Scotland) Aaron Muirhead	Falkirk	9
6	(Scotland) Andy Dowie	Queen of the South	9
6	(Scotland) Kevin McHattie	Raith Rovers	9

===== Red cards =====
As of matches played on 6 May 2017

Rank	Player	Club	Cards
1	(Scotland) Lewis Toshney	Dundee United	2
1	(Scotland) Lewis Martin	Dunfermline Athletic	2
1	(England) Marvin Bartley	Hibernian	2
4	22 players		1

==== Club ====
===== Yellow cards =====
As of matches played on 6 May 2017

Rank	Club	Cards
1	Raith Rovers	88
2	Dundee United	72
3	Queen of the South	64

===== Red cards =====
As of matches played on 6 May 2017

Rank	Club	Cards
1	Dunfermline Athletic	6
2	Hibernian	5
3	Dundee United	4

=== Attendances ===
Pos	Team	Total	High	Low	Average	Change
1	Ayr United	33,592	3,100	1,103	1,866	−41.9%
2	Dumbarton	20,345	1,660	600	1,130	+8.5%
3	Dundee United	118,516	10,925	4,661	6,584	−17.4%
4	Dunfermline Athletic	79,885	7,622	2,653	4,438	+26.9%
5	Falkirk	90,580	6,747	4,160	5,032	+7.8%
6	Greenock Morton	42,513	4,609	1,451	2,361	−13.5%
7	Hibernian	277,096	19,764	13,604	15,394	+64.8%
8	Queen of the South	33,418	3,703	1,147	1,856	−12.2%
9	Raith Rovers	47,365	5,899	1,161	2,631	+13.6%
10	St Mirren	64,775	4,997	2,126	3,598	+1.4%
	League total	808,085	19,764	600	4,489	−39.3%

Updated to games played on 6 May 2017

== Awards ==
=== Monthly awards ===
Month	Manager of the Month		Player of the Month		Ref.
Month	Manager	Club	Player	Club	Ref.
August	(Northern Ireland) Neil Lennon	Hibernian	(Scotland) Jason Cummings	Hibernian	
September	(Scotland) Peter Houston	Falkirk	(Scotland) Cammy Bell	Dundee United	
October	(Scotland) Jim Duffy	Greenock Morton	(Scotland) Thomas O'Ware	Greenock Morton	
November	(Scotland) Ray McKinnon	Dundee United	(Scotland) John McGinn	Hibernian	
December	(Scotland) Stephen Aitken	Dumbarton	(Scotland) Mark Docherty	Dumbarton	
January	(Northern Ireland) Neil Lennon	Hibernian	(Scotland) Ross Forbes	Greenock Morton	
February	(Scotland) Peter Houston	Falkirk	(Scotland) Jason Cummings	Hibernian	
March	(Scotland) Jack Ross	St Mirren	(Nigeria) Efe Ambrose	Hibernian	
April	(Scotland) Jack Ross	St Mirren	(Scotland) Stevie Mallan	St Mirren	

PFA Scotland Team of the Year

=== Annual awards ===
==== Championship Manager of the Season ====
- The Championship Manager of the Season was awarded to Jim Duffy.

==== Championship Player of the Season ====
- The Championship Player of the Season was awarded to John McGinn.

==== PFA Scotland Scottish Championship Team of the Year ====
The PFA Scotland Scottish Championship Team of the Year was:

- Goalkeeper: Cammy Bell (Dundee United)
- Defence: Nicky Devlin (Ayr United), Darren McGregor (Hibernian), Thomas O'Ware (Greenock Morton), Lewis Stevenson (Hibernian)
- Midfield: Stevie Mallan (St Mirren), John McGinn (Hibernian), Ross Forbes (Greenock Morton)
- Attack: Tony Andreu (Dundee United), Stephen Dobbie (Queen of the South), Jason Cummings (Hibernian)

== Championship play-offs ==
Raith Rovers the second bottom team, entered into a 4-team playoff with the 2nd-4th placed teams in 2016–17 Scottish League One; Alloa Athletic, Airdrieonians and Brechin City.

=== Semi-finals ===
==== First leg ====
10 May 2017	Brechin City	1 – 1	Raith Rovers	Brechin
19:45	Caldwell 45+1' (pen.)	BBC Sport report	McManus 70'	Stadium: Glebe Park; Attendance: 1,022; Referee: Don Robertson

10 May 2017	Airdrieonians	1 – 0	Alloa Athletic	Airdrie
19:45	Ryan 52'	BBC Sport report		Stadium: Excelsior Stadium; Attendance: 1,199; Referee: Stephen Finnie

==== Second leg ====
13 May 2017	Raith Rovers	3 – 3 (a.e.t.) (4 – 4 agg.) (3 – 4 p)	Brechin City	Kirkcaldy
15:00	Mvoto 68'; McManus 90+1'; Hardie 101'	BBC Sport report	Caldwell 51'; Trouten 84'; Watt 115'	Stadium: Stark's Park; Referee: Alan Muir
	Penalties
	Handling (penalty scored); Thompson (penalty scored); B. Barr (penalty missed); McManus (penalty scored); Robertson (penalty missed)		Dyer (penalty scored); Watt (penalty missed); McLean (penalty missed); Trouten (penalty scored); Love (penalty scored); Jackson (penalty scored)

13 May 2017	Alloa Athletic	1 – 0 (a.e.t.) (1 – 1 agg.) (4 – 3 p)	Airdrieonians	Alloa
15:00	Robertson 50'	BBC Sport report		Stadium: Recreation Park; Referee: Barry Cook
	Penalties
	Taggart (penalty scored); Hetherington (penalty missed); Kirkpatrick (penalty scored); Graham (penalty scored); Waters (penalty scored)		Ryan (penalty scored); Leitch (penalty scored); Russell (penalty missed); MacDonald (penalty missed); McIntosh (penalty scored)

=== Final ===
The winners of the semi-finals will compete against one another over two legs, with the winner competing in the 2017–18 Scottish Championship.

==== First leg ====
17 May 2017	Brechin City	1 – 0	Alloa Athletic	Brechin
19:35	Ford 56'	BBC Sport report		Stadium: Glebe Park; Attendance: 702; Referee: Euan Anderson

==== Second leg ====
20 May 2017	Alloa Athletic	4 – 3 (a.e.t.) (4 – 4 agg.) (4 – 5 p)	Brechin City	Alloa
17:15	Spence 36', 40', 73'; Mackin 79'	BBC Sport report	Dale 34'; McLean 54'; Watt 78'	Stadium: Recreation Park; Attendance: 1,204; Referee: Nick Walsh
	Penalties
	Taggart (penalty scored); Spence (penalty missed); Kirkpatrick (penalty scored); Graham (penalty scored); Waters (penalty scored); Flannigan (penalty missed)		Dyer (penalty scored); Hill (penalty scored); Jackson (penalty missed); Trouten (penalty scored); Love (penalty scored); Dale (penalty scored)
