= 2016–17 Scottish Premiership =

111th season of top-tier football league in Scotland

Scottish Premiership
- Season: 2016–17
- Dates: 6 August 2016 – 21 May 2017
- Champions: Celtic; 4th Premiership title 48th Scottish title
- Relegated: Inverness Caledonian Thistle
- Champions League: Celtic
- Europa League: Aberdeen; Rangers; St Johnstone
- Matches: 228
- Goals: 628 (2.75 per match)
- Top goalscorer: Liam Boyce (23 goals)
- Biggest home win: Celtic 6–1 Kilmarnock (24 September 2016); Aberdeen 7–2 Motherwell (15 February 2017)
- Biggest away win: Dundee 0–7 Aberdeen (31 March 2017)
- Highest scoring: Aberdeen 7–2 Motherwell (15 February 2017)
- Longest winning run: 22 matches: Celtic
- Longest unbeaten run: 38 matches: Celtic
- Longest winless run: 14 matches: Inverness Caledonian Thistle
- Longest losing run: 7 matches: Dundee
- Highest attendance: 58,967; Celtic 2–0 Heart of Midlothian (21 May 2017)
- Lowest attendance: 1,548; Hamilton Academical 1–1 Ross County (8 April 2017)
- Total attendance: 3,184,955
- Average attendance: 13,969 (4,325)

The 2016–17 Scottish Premiership (known as the Ladbrokes Premiership for sponsorship reasons) was the fourth season of the Scottish Premiership, the highest division of Scottish football. The fixtures were published on 17 June 2016. The season began on 6 August 2016. Celtic were the defending champions.

Twelve teams contested the league: Aberdeen, Celtic, Dundee, Hamilton Academical, Heart of Midlothian, Inverness CT, Kilmarnock, Motherwell, Partick Thistle, Rangers, Ross County and St Johnstone.

On 2 April 2017, Celtic won their sixth consecutive title and 48th overall after a 5–0 win away to Hearts, with eight matches still to play and would go on to complete the season unbeaten.

== Teams ==
The following teams have changed division since the 2015–16 season.

=== To Premiership ===
Promoted from Scottish Championship

- Rangers

=== From Premiership ===
Relegated to Scottish Championship

- Dundee United

=== Stadia and locations ===
| Aberdeen | Celtic | Dundee | Hamilton Academical |
|---|---|---|---|
| Pittodrie Stadium | Celtic Park | Dens Park | New Douglas Park |
| Capacity: 20,866 | Capacity: 60,411 | Capacity: 11,506 | Capacity: 5,510 |
| Heart of Midlothian | Location of teams in 2016–17 Scottish Premiership | | Inverness Caledonian Thistle |
| Tynecastle Stadium | Location of teams in 2016–17 Scottish Premiership | | Caledonian Stadium |
| Capacity: 17,480 | Location of teams in 2016–17 Scottish Premiership | | Capacity: 7,512 |
| Kilmarnock | Location of teams in 2016–17 Scottish Premiership | | Motherwell |
| Rugby Park | Location of teams in 2016–17 Scottish Premiership | | Fir Park |
| Capacity: 17,891 | Location of teams in 2016–17 Scottish Premiership | | Capacity: 13,677 |
| Partick Thistle | Rangers | Ross County | St Johnstone |
| Firhill Stadium | Ibrox Stadium | Victoria Park | McDiarmid Park |
| Capacity: 10,102 | Capacity: 50,817 | Capacity: 6,541 | Capacity: 10,696 |

=== Personnel and kits ===
| Team | Manager | Captain | Kit manufacturer | Shirt sponsor |
|---|---|---|---|---|
| Aberdeen | (Scotland) Derek McInnes | (Scotland) Ryan Jack | Adidas | Saltire Energy |
| Celtic | (Northern Ireland) Brendan Rodgers | (Scotland) Scott Brown | New Balance | Dafabet |
| Dundee | (Scotland) Neil McCann (interim) | (Northern Ireland) James McPake | Puma | McEwan Fraser Legal |
| Hamilton Academical | (Scotland) Martin Canning | (Scotland) Michael Devlin | Adidas | SuperSeal (H), NetBet (A) |
| Heart of Midlothian | (Scotland) Ian Cathro | (United States) Perry Kitchen | Puma | Save the Children |
| Inverness CT | (Republic of Ireland) Richie Foran | (England) Gary Warren | Carbrini | McEwan Fraser Legal |
| Kilmarnock | (Scotland) Lee McCulloch (interim) | (Scotland) Steven Smith | Nike | QTS |
| Motherwell | (Northern Ireland) Stephen Robinson | (Scotland) Keith Lasley | Macron | Motorpoint |
| Partick Thistle | (Scotland) Alan Archibald | (Ghana) Abdul Osman | Joma | Kingsford Capital Management |
| Rangers | (Portugal) Pedro Caixinha | (Scotland) Lee Wallace | Puma | 32Red |
| Ross County | (Scotland) Jim McIntyre | (Scotland) Paul Quinn | Macron | Stanley CRC Evans Offshore |
| St Johnstone | (Northern Ireland) Tommy Wright | (Scotland) Steven Anderson | Joma | Alan Storrar Cars |

=== Managerial changes ===
| Team | Outgoing manager | Manner of departure | Date of vacancy | Position in table | Incoming manager | Date of appointment |
|---|---|---|---|---|---|---|
| Celtic | (Norway) Ronny Deila | Resigned | 15 May 2016 | Pre-season | (Northern Ireland) Brendan Rodgers | 20 May 2016 |
| Inverness CT | (Scotland) John Hughes | Resigned | 20 May 2016 | Pre-season | (Republic of Ireland) Richie Foran | 30 May 2016 |
| Heart of Midlothian | (Scotland) Robbie Neilson | Signed by MK Dons | 2 December 2016 | 2nd | (Scotland) Ian Cathro | 5 December 2016 |
| Rangers | (England) Mark Warburton | Resigned | 10 February 2017 | 3rd | (Portugal) Pedro Caixinha | 13 March 2017 |
| Kilmarnock | (England) Lee Clark | Signed by Bury | 15 February 2017 | 6th | (Scotland) Lee McCulloch (interim) | 15 February 2017 |
| Motherwell | (Scotland) Mark McGhee | Sacked | 28 February 2017 | 10th | (Northern Ireland) Stephen Robinson^{a} | 28 February 2017 |
| Dundee | (Scotland) Paul Hartley | Sacked | 17 April 2017 | 11th | (Scotland) Neil McCann (interim) | 18 April 2017 |

a.Initially interim, made permanent 15 March 2017

== Format ==
In the initial phase of the season, each of the twelve teams play the other eleven teams three times. After 33 rounds, the league splits into two sections, a top six and a bottom six, with each team playing all the other teams in their section once. The league attempts to balance the fixture list so that teams in the same section have played each other twice at home and twice away, but sometimes this is impossible. A total of 228 matches will be played, with 38 matches played by each team.

== League summary ==
=== League table ===
| Pos | Team | Pld | W | D | L | GF | GA | GD | Pts | Qualification or relegation (Note: Teams played each other three times (33 matches), before the league split into two groups (the top six and the bottom six) for the last five matches.) |
|---|---|---|---|---|---|---|---|---|---|---|
| 1 | Celtic (C) | 38 | 34 | 4 | 0 | 106 | 25 | +81 | 106 | Qualification for the Champions League second qualifying round (Note: Since the winners of the 2016–17 Scottish Cup, Celtic, qualified for European competition based on league position, the spot awarded to the Scottish cup winners (Europa League second qualifying round) was passed to the second-placed team and the spot awarded to the second-placed team (Europa League first qualifying round) was passed to the fourth-placed team.) |
| 2 | Aberdeen | 38 | 24 | 4 | 10 | 74 | 35 | +39 | 76 | Qualification for the Europa League second qualifying round |
| 3 | Rangers | 38 | 19 | 10 | 9 | 56 | 44 | +12 | 67 | Qualification for the Europa League first qualifying round |
| 4 | St Johnstone | 38 | 17 | 7 | 14 | 50 | 46 | +4 | 58 | Qualification for the Europa League first qualifying round |
| 5 | Heart of Midlothian | 38 | 12 | 10 | 16 | 55 | 52 | +3 | 46 | |
| 6 | Partick Thistle | 38 | 10 | 12 | 16 | 38 | 54 | −16 | 42 | |
| 7 | Ross County | 38 | 11 | 13 | 14 | 48 | 58 | −10 | 46 | |
| 8 | Kilmarnock | 38 | 9 | 14 | 15 | 36 | 56 | −20 | 41 | |
| 9 | Motherwell | 38 | 10 | 8 | 20 | 46 | 69 | −23 | 38 | |
| 10 | Dundee | 38 | 10 | 7 | 21 | 38 | 62 | −24 | 37 | |
| 11 | Hamilton Academical (O) | 38 | 7 | 14 | 17 | 37 | 56 | −19 | 35 | Qualification for the Premiership play-off final |
| 12 | Inverness Caledonian Thistle (R) | 38 | 7 | 13 | 18 | 44 | 71 | −27 | 34 | Relegation to the Scottish Championship |

Source: Scottish Premiership, Soccerway
Rules for classification: 1) Points; 2) Goal difference; 3) Goals scored; 4) Play-off (only if deciding champion, UEFA competitions qualification and second stage group allocation).
(C) Champions; (O) Play-off winners; (R) Relegated

=== Positions by round ===
The table lists the positions of teams after each week of matches. In order to preserve chronological progress, any postponed matches are not included in the round at which they were originally scheduled, but added to the full round they were played immediately afterwards. For example, if a match is scheduled for matchday 13, but then postponed and played between days 16 and 17, it will be added to the standings for day 16.

| Leader – Qualification to Champions League second qualifying round |
| Qualification to Europa League first qualifying round |
| Qualification to Premiership play-off final |
| Relegation to 2017–18 Scottish Championship |

| Team \ Round | 1 | 2 | 3 | 4 | 5 | 6 | 7 | 8 | 9 | 10 | 11 | 12 | 13 | 14 | 15 | 16 | 17 | 18 | 19 | 20 | 21 | 22 | 23 | 24 | 25 | 26 | 27 | 28 | 29 | 30 | 31 | 32 | 33 | 34 | 35 | 36 | 37 | 38 |
|---|---|---|---|---|---|---|---|---|---|---|---|---|---|---|---|---|---|---|---|---|---|---|---|---|---|---|---|---|---|---|---|---|---|---|---|---|---|---|
| Celtic | 3 | 5 | 2 | 1 | 1 | 1 | 1 | 1 | 1 | 1 | 1 | 1 | 1 | 1 | 1 | 1 | 1 | 1 | 1 | 1 | 1 | 1 | 1 | 1 | 1 | 1 | 1 | 1 | 1 | 1 | 1 | 1 | 1 | 1 | 1 | 1 | 1 | 1 |
| Aberdeen | 7 | 9 | 4 | 7 | 7 | 4 | 2 | 2 | 2 | 2 | 2 | 3 | 2 | 2 | 3 | 4 | 3 | 3 | 3 | 3 | 3 | 3 | 3 | 2 | 2 | 2 | 2 | 2 | 2 | 2 | 2 | 2 | 2 | 2 | 2 | 2 | 2 | 2 |
| Rangers | 6 | 1 | 1 | 2 | 3 | 5 | 7 | 5 | 4 | 5 | 5 | 2 | 3 | 3 | 2 | 2 | 2 | 2 | 2 | 2 | 2 | 2 | 2 | 3 | 3 | 3 | 3 | 3 | 3 | 3 | 3 | 3 | 3 | 3 | 3 | 3 | 3 | 3 |
| St Johnstone | 8 | 2 | 7 | 9 | 5 | 3 | 4 | 4 | 5 | 4 | 3 | 5 | 5 | 5 | 5 | 5 | 5 | 5 | 5 | 5 | 5 | 5 | 5 | 5 | 5 | 5 | 5 | 5 | 4 | 4 | 4 | 4 | 4 | 4 | 4 | 4 | 4 | 4 |
| Heart of Midlothian | 9 | 11 | 5 | 3 | 2 | 2 | 3 | 3 | 3 | 3 | 4 | 4 | 4 | 4 | 4 | 3 | 4 | 4 | 4 | 4 | 4 | 4 | 4 | 4 | 4 | 4 | 4 | 4 | 5 | 5 | 5 | 5 | 5 | 5 | 5 | 5 | 5 | 5 |
| Partick Thistle | 2 | 3 | 8 | 11 | 12 | 12 | 12 | 12 | 11 | 11 | 9 | 7 | 8 | 11 | 12 | 11 | 12 | 12 | 9 | 6 | 7 | 6 | 7 | 9 | 7 | 7 | 6 | 6 | 6 | 6 | 6 | 6 | 6 | 6 | 6 | 6 | 6 | 6 |
| Ross County | 11 | 8 | 3 | 4 | 4 | 7 | 6 | 7 | 8 | 7 | 10 | 11 | 12 | 8 | 8 | 7 | 7 | 6 | 6 | 8 | 6 | 7 | 8 | 7 | 9 | 9 | 9 | 9 | 9 | 9 | 8 | 8 | 8 | 8 | 7 | 8 | 7 | 7 |
| Kilmarnock | 10 | 6 | 10 | 10 | 10 | 9 | 11 | 11 | 9 | 8 | 7 | 8 | 7 | 9 | 11 | 6 | 6 | 7 | 8 | 10 | 10 | 8 | 9 | 8 | 8 | 8 | 8 | 7 | 7 | 7 | 7 | 7 | 7 | 7 | 8 | 7 | 8 | 8 |
| Motherwell | 4 | 7 | 9 | 8 | 8 | 6 | 5 | 6 | 6 | 9 | 11 | 9 | 10 | 6 | 6 | 9 | 9 | 8 | 10 | 7 | 9 | 10 | 6 | 6 | 10 | 10 | 10 | 10 | 10 | 10 | 10 | 11 | 10 | 11 | 11 | 10 | 9 | 9 |
| Dundee | 1 | 4 | 6 | 5 | 6 | 8 | 9 | 10 | 12 | 12 | 12 | 12 | 11 | 12 | 7 | 10 | 10 | 10 | 7 | 9 | 8 | 9 | 10 | 10 | 6 | 6 | 7 | 8 | 8 | 8 | 9 | 9 | 11 | 9 | 9 | 9 | 10 | 10 |
| Hamilton Academical | 5 | 10 | 11 | 6 | 9 | 10 | 10 | 9 | 10 | 10 | 8 | 10 | 9 | 10 | 10 | 8 | 8 | 9 | 11 | 11 | 11 | 11 | 11 | 11 | 11 | 12 | 11 | 11 | 12 | 11 | 11 | 10 | 9 | 10 | 10 | 11 | 11 | 11 |
| Inverness Caledonian Thistle | 12 | 12 | 12 | 12 | 11 | 11 | 8 | 8 | 7 | 6 | 6 | 6 | 6 | 7 | 9 | 12 | 11 | 11 | 12 | 12 | 12 | 12 | 12 | 12 | 12 | 11 | 12 | 12 | 11 | 12 | 12 | 12 | 12 | 12 | 12 | 12 | 12 | 12 |

Source: BBC Sport

== Results ==
=== Matches 1–22 ===
Teams play each other twice, once at home and once away.

| Home \ Away | ABE | CEL | DND | HAM | HOM | INV | KIL | MOT | PAR | RAN | ROS | STJ |
|---|---|---|---|---|---|---|---|---|---|---|---|---|
| Aberdeen | — | 0–1 | 3–0 | 2–1 | 0–0 | 1–1 | 5–1 | 7–2 | 2–1 | 2–1 | 4–0 | 0–0 |
| Celtic | 4–1 | — | 2–1 | 1–0 | 4–0 | 3–0 | 6–1 | 2–0 | 1–0 | 5–1 | 2–0 | 1–0 |
| Dundee | 1–3 | 0–1 | — | 1–1 | 3–2 | 2–1 | 1–1 | 2–0 | 0–2 | 1–2 | 0–0 | 3–0 |
| Hamilton Academical | 1–0 | 0–3 | 0–1 | — | 3–3 | 1–1 | 1–2 | 1–1 | 1–1 | 1–2 | 1–0 | 1–1 |
| Heart of Midlothian | 0–1 | 1–2 | 2–0 | 3–1 | — | 5–1 | 4–0 | 3–0 | 1–1 | 2–0 | 0–0 | 2–2 |
| Inverness Caledonian Thistle | 1–3 | 2–2 | 3–1 | 1–1 | 3–3 | — | 1–1 | 1–2 | 0–0 | 0–1 | 2–3 | 2–1 |
| Kilmarnock | 0–4 | 0–1 | 2–0 | 0–0 | 2–0 | 1–1 | — | 1–2 | 2–2 | 1–1 | 3–2 | 0–1 |
| Motherwell | 1–3 | 3–4 | 0–0 | 4–2 | 1–3 | 0–3 | 0–0 | — | 2–0 | 0–2 | 4–1 | 1–2 |
| Partick Thistle | 1–2 | 1–4 | 2–0 | 2–2 | 1–2 | 2–0 | 0–0 | 1–1 | — | 1–2 | 1–1 | 0–2 |
| Rangers | 2–1 | 1–2 | 1–0 | 1–1 | 2–0 | 1–0 | 3–0 | 2–1 | 2–0 | — | 0–0 | 1–1 |
| Ross County | 2–1 | 0–4 | 1–3 | 1–1 | 2–2 | 3–2 | 2–0 | 1–1 | 1–3 | 1–1 | — | 0–2 |
| St Johnstone | 0–0 | 2–4 | 2–1 | 3–0 | 1–0 | 3–0 | 0–1 | 1–1 | 1–2 | 1–1 | 2–4 | — |

Source: Scottish Premiership
Legend: Blue = home team win; Yellow = draw; Red = away team win.
For upcoming matches, an "a" indicates there is an article about the rivalry between the two participants.

=== Matches 23–33 ===
Teams play every other team once (either at home or away).

| Home \ Away | ABE | CEL | DND | HAM | HOM | INV | KIL | MOT | PAR | RAN | ROS | STJ |
|---|---|---|---|---|---|---|---|---|---|---|---|---|
| Aberdeen | — | — | — | — | 2–0 | 1–0 | — | 1–0 | 2–0 | 0–3 | 1–0 | — |
| Celtic | 1–0 | — | — | 2–0 | — | — | 3–1 | 2–0 | 1–1 | 1–1 | — | — |
| Dundee | 0–7 | 1–2 | — | 0–2 | — | — | 1–1 | — | 0–1 | 2–1 | — | — |
| Hamilton Academical | 1–0 | — | — | — | — | 3–0 | 1–1 | — | — | — | 1–1 | 1–0 |
| Heart of Midlothian | — | 0–5 | 1–0 | 4–0 | — | 1–1 | — | — | — | 4–1 | 0–1 | — |
| Inverness Caledonian Thistle | — | 0–4 | 2–2 | — | — | — | 1–1 | — | — | 2–1 | 1–1 | 0–3 |
| Kilmarnock | 1–2 | — | — | — | 0–0 | — | — | 1–2 | 1–1 | 0–0 | — | — |
| Motherwell | — | — | 1–5 | 0–0 | 0–3 | 4–2 | — | — | — | — | — | 1–2 |
| Partick Thistle | — | — | — | 2–0 | 2–0 | 1–1 | — | 1–0 | — | — | 2–1 | 0–1 |
| Rangers | — | — | — | 4–0 | — | — | — | 1–1 | 2–0 | — | 1–1 | 3–2 |
| Ross County | — | 2–2 | 2–1 | — | — | — | 1–2 | 1–2 | — | — | — | 1–2 |
| St Johnstone | 1–2 | 2–5 | 2–0 | — | 1–0 | — | 0–2 | — | — | — | — | — |

Source: Scottish Premiership
Legend: Blue = home team win; Yellow = draw; Red = away team win.
For upcoming matches, an "a" indicates there is an article about the rivalry between the two participants.

=== Matches 34–38 ===
After 33 matches, the league splits into two sections of six teams i.e. the top six and the bottom six, with the teams playing every other team in their section once (either at home or away). The exact matches are determined by the position of the teams in the league table at the time of the split.

==== Top six ====
| Home \ Away | ABE | CEL | HOM | PAR | RAN | STJ |
|---|---|---|---|---|---|---|
| Aberdeen | — | 1–3 | — | — | — | 0–2 |
| Celtic | — | — | 2–0 | — | — | 4–1 |
| Heart of Midlothian | 1–2 | — | — | 2–2 | — | — |
| Partick Thistle | 0–6 | 0–5 | — | — | 1–2 | — |
| Rangers | 1–2 | 1–5 | 2–1 | — | — | — |
| St Johnstone | — | — | 1–0 | 1–0 | 1–2 | — |

Source: Scottish Premiership
Legend: Blue = home team win; Yellow = draw; Red = away team win.
For upcoming matches, an "a" indicates there is an article about the rivalry between the two participants.

==== Bottom six ====
| Home \ Away | DND | HAM | INV | KIL | MOT | ROS |
|---|---|---|---|---|---|---|
| Dundee | — | — | 0–2 | — | — | 1–1 |
| Hamilton Academical | 4–0 | — | — | 0–2 | 0–1 | — |
| Inverness Caledonian Thistle | — | 2–1 | — | — | 3–2 | — |
| Kilmarnock | 0–1 | — | 2–1 | — | — | 1–2 |
| Motherwell | 2–3 | — | — | 3–1 | — | 0–1 |
| Ross County | — | 3–2 | 4–0 | — | — | — |

Source: Scottish Premiership
Legend: Blue = home team win; Yellow = draw; Red = away team win.
For upcoming matches, an "a" indicates there is an article about the rivalry between the two participants.

== Season statistics ==
=== Top scorers ===
As of matches played on 21 May 2017

| Rank | Player | Club | Goals |
|---|---|---|---|
| 1 | (Northern Ireland) Liam Boyce | Ross County | 23 |
| 2 | (England) Scott Sinclair | Celtic | 21 |
| 3 | (France) Moussa Dembélé | Celtic | 17 |
| 4 | (Scotland) Stuart Armstrong | Celtic | 15 |
| 4 | (England) Louis Moult | Motherwell | 15 |
| 6 | (Scotland) Kris Doolan | Partick Thistle | 14 |
| 7 | (Republic of Ireland) Adam Rooney | Aberdeen | 12 |
| 7 | (Scotland) Leigh Griffiths | Celtic | 12 |
| 7 | (Scotland) Jamie Walker | Hearts | 12 |
| 10 | (Scotland) Kenny Miller | Rangers | 11 |

=== Hat-tricks ===
| Player | For | Against | Result | Date | Reference |
|---|---|---|---|---|---|
| (Northern Ireland) Liam Boyce | Ross County | Inverness Caledonian Thistle | 3–2 (A) | 13 August 2016 | |
| (France) Moussa Dembélé | Celtic | Rangers | 5–1 (H) | 10 September 2016 | |
| (England) Louis Moult^{4} | Motherwell | Hamilton Academical | 4–2 (H) | 17 September 2016 | |
| (France) Moussa Dembélé | Celtic | St Johnstone | 5–2 (A) | 5 February 2017 | |
| (Republic of Ireland) Adam Rooney | Aberdeen | Motherwell | 7–2 (H) | 15 February 2017 | |
| (Scotland) Andrew Considine | Aberdeen | Dundee | 7–0 (A) | 31 March 2017 | |
| (England) Scott Sinclair | Celtic | Heart of Midlothian | 5–0 (A) | 2 April 2017 | |
| (Northern Ireland) Liam Boyce^{4} | Ross County | Inverness Caledonian Thistle | 4–0 (H) | 28 April 2017 | |
| (Scotland) Scott Wright | Aberdeen | Partick Thistle | 6–0 (A) | 21 May 2017 | |

Notes

- (H) – Home; (A) – Away
- ^{4} Player scored 4 goals

== Awards ==
| Month | Manager of the Month | | Player of the Month | | Ref. |
| Month | Manager | Club | Player | Club | Ref. |
|---|---|---|---|---|---|
| August | (Northern Ireland) Brendan Rodgers | Celtic | (Northern Ireland) Liam Boyce | Ross County | |
| September | (Republic of Ireland) Richie Foran | Inverness CT | (France) Moussa Dembélé | Celtic | |
| October | (Northern Ireland) Brendan Rodgers | Celtic | (Republic of Ireland) Adam Barton | Partick Thistle | |
| November | (Scotland) Robbie Neilson | Heart of Midlothian | (Norway) Bjørn Johnsen | Heart of Midlothian | |
| December | (Northern Ireland) Brendan Rodgers | Celtic | (Scotland) Stuart Armstrong | Celtic | |
| January | No awards due to winter break | | | | |
| February | (Scotland) Paul Hartley | Dundee | (France) Moussa Dembélé | Celtic | |
| March | (Scotland) Derek McInnes | Aberdeen | (Scotland) Stuart Armstrong | Celtic | |
| April | (Northern Ireland) Brendan Rodgers | Celtic | (Northern Ireland) Liam Boyce | Ross County | |

=== Annual awards ===
| Award | Winner | Club |
|---|---|---|
| Ladbrokes Premiership Player of the Year | (Scotland) Scott Brown | Celtic |
| PFA Scotland Premiership Player of the Year | (England) Scott Sinclair | Celtic |
| PFA Scotland SPFL Young Player of the Year | (Scotland) Kieran Tierney | Celtic |
| PFA Scotland SPFL Manager of the Year | (Northern Ireland) Brendan Rodgers | Celtic |
| PFA Scotland Goal of the Season | (France) Moussa Dembélé | Celtic |
| SFWA Player of the Year | (England) Scott Sinclair | Celtic |

PFA Scotland Team of the Year
| Goalkeeper | (England) Joe Lewis (Aberdeen) | | | |
| Defenders | (England) Shay Logan (Aberdeen) | (Sweden) Mikael Lustig (Celtic) | (Scotland) Liam Lindsay (Partick Thistle) | (Scotland) Kieran Tierney (Celtic) |
| Midfielders | (Scotland) Stuart Armstrong (Celtic) | | (Scotland) Scott Brown (Celtic) | (Scotland) Kenny McLean (Aberdeen) |
| Forwards | (Scotland) Jonny Hayes (Aberdeen) | | (France) Moussa Dembélé (Celtic) | (England) Scott Sinclair (Celtic) |

== Premiership play-offs ==
The quarter-final was contested between the 3rd and 4th placed teams (Dundee United and Greenock Morton) in the Scottish Championship. After defeating Greenock Morton 5–1 over two legs, Dundee United advanced to the semi-finals to face the 2nd placed team (Falkirk) in the Championship. Dundee United progressed to the play-off final following a 4–3 aggregate victory, but then lost 1–0 on aggregate to Hamilton Academical in the final. Hamilton therefore retained their place in the Premiership for the 2017–18 season.

Quarter-final
3 | Dundee United | 2 | 3 | 5
4 | Greenock Morton | 1 | 0 | 1

Semi-final
2 | Falkirk | 2 | 1 | 3
3 | Dundee United | 2 | 2 | 4

Final
1 | Hamilton Academical | 0 | 1 | 1
3 | Dundee United | 0 | 0 | 0

=== Quarter-final ===
==== First leg ====
| 9 May 2017 | Greenock Morton | 1–2 | Dundee United | Greenock |
| 19:45 | O'Ware 7' | BBC Report | Murray 51'; Spittal 65' | Stadium: Cappielow; Attendance: 3,306; Referee: Willie Collum |

==== Second leg ====
| 12 May 2017 | Dundee United | 3–0 (5–1 agg.) | Greenock Morton | Dundee |
| 19:45 | Murray 52'; Kuaté 64'; Spittal 81' | BBC Report | | Stadium: Tannadice Park; Attendance: 6,606; Referee: Andrew Dallas |

=== Semi-final ===
==== First leg ====
| 16 May 2017 | Dundee United | 2–2 | Falkirk | Dundee |
| 19:45 | Murray 16'; Spittal 53' | BBC Report | Craigen 27'; McKee 59' | Stadium: Tannadice Park; Attendance: 7,034; Referee: Bobby Madden |

==== Second leg ====
| 19 May 2017 | Falkirk | 1–2 (3–4 agg.) | Dundee United | Falkirk |
| 19:45 | Craigen 11' | BBC Report | Murray 76'; Dixon 87' | Stadium: Falkirk Stadium; Attendance: 7,926; Referee: Kevin Clancy |

=== Final ===
==== First leg ====
| 25 May 2017 | Dundee United | 0–0 | Hamilton Academical | Dundee |
| 19:45 | | BBC Report | | Stadium: Tannadice Park; Attendance: 9,386; Referee: Steven McLean |

==== Second leg ====
| 28 May 2017 | Hamilton Academical | 1–0 (1–0 agg.) | Dundee United | Hamilton |
| 15:00 | Docherty 64' | BBC Report | | Stadium: New Douglas Park; Attendance: 5,027; Referee: Craig Thomson |

== Attendances ==
These are the average attendances of the teams.

| Pos | Team | Total | High | Low | Average | Change |
|---|---|---|---|---|---|---|
| 1 | Celtic | 1,037,864 | 58,967 | 37,404 | 54,624 | +21.8% |
| 2 | Rangers | 928,974 | 50,126 | 46,563 | 48,893 | +7.9% |
| 3 | Heart of Midlothian | 310,192 | 16,803 | 15,470 | 16,325 | −0.6% |
| 4 | Aberdeen | 240,176 | 19,332 | 8,195 | 12,640 | −3.5% |
| 5 | Dundee | 122,200 | 9,702 | 4,708 | 6,431 | +5.0% |
| 6 | Kilmarnock | 94,310 | 11,800 | 3,056 | 4,963 | +24.3% |
| 7 | Motherwell | 85,229 | 8,535 | 3,131 | 4,485 | −8.7% |
| 8 | St Johnstone | 83,451 | 7,979 | 2,549 | 4,392 | +13.2% |
| 9 | Partick Thistle | 85,648 | 7,951 | 2,257 | 4,282 | +12.7% |
| 10 | Ross County | 73,861 | 6,590 | 2,511 | 4,103 | +1.7% |
| 11 | Inverness Caledonian Thistle | 74,968 | 7,012 | 2,473 | 3,945 | +5.1% |
| 12 | Hamilton Academical | 48,082 | 5,292 | 1,548 | 2,530 | −16.4% |
| | League total | 3,184,955 | 58,967 | 1,548 | 13,969 | +44.8% |

Updated to games played on 21 May 2017

== See also ==
- Nine in a row
