= Scottish Professional Football League yearly awards =

This article lists the winners of the yearly awards in the Scottish Professional Football League (SPFL).

== List of award winners ==
The awards have been handed out by the Scottish Professional Football League (SPFL) since the 2015–16 season. The awards are voted for by members of the Scottish media, with a Manager and Player of the Year selected for each of the four divisions of the Scottish Professional Football League (SPFL) at the end of every season.

Season	Premiership Manager		Premiership Player	
Season	Winner	Club	Winner	Club
2015–16	Tommy Wright	St Johnstone	Leigh Griffiths	Celtic
2016–17	Brendan Rodgers	Celtic	Scott Brown	Celtic
2017–18	Brendan Rodgers	Celtic	Scott Brown	Celtic
2018–19	Steve Clarke	Kilmarnock	James Forrest	Celtic
2019–20	Season was curtailed due to the COVID-19 pandemic.			
2020–21	Steven Gerrard	Rangers	Allan McGregor	Rangers
2021–22	Ange Postecoglou	Celtic	Craig Gordon	Heart of Midlothian
2022–23	Ange Postecoglou	Celtic	Kyogo Furuhashi	Celtic
2023–24	Derek McInnes	Kilmarnock	Lawrence Shankland	Heart of Midlothian
2024–25	Brendan Rodgers	Celtic	Daizen Maeda	Celtic
2025–26	Derek McInnes	Heart of Midlothian	Cláudio Braga	Heart of Midlothian

Season	Championship Manager		Championship Player	
Season	Winner	Club	Winner	Club
2015–16	Peter Houston	Falkirk	John McGinn	Hibernian
2016–17	Jim Duffy	Greenock Morton	John McGinn	Hibernian
2017–18	Jack Ross	St Mirren	Lewis Morgan	St Mirren
2018–19	Steve Ferguson & Stuart Kettlewell	Ross County	Stephen Dobbie	Queen of the South
2019–20	Season was curtailed due to the COVID-19 pandemic.			
2020–21	James McPake	Dundee	Charlie Adam	Dundee
2021–22	Dick Campbell	Arbroath	Michael McKenna	Arbroath
2022–23	Gary Bowyer	Dundee	Dipo Akinyemi	Ayr United
2023–24	Jim Goodwin	Dundee United	Louis Moult	Dundee United
2024–25	John McGlynn	Falkirk	Calvin Miller	Falkirk
2025–26			Josh McPake	St Johnstone

Season	League One Manager		League One Player	
Season	Winner	Club	Winner	Club
2015–16	Ian McCall	Ayr United	not awarded	
2016–17	not awarded		not awarded	
2017–18	Ian McCall	Ayr United	Lawrence Shankland	Ayr United
2018–19	Dick Campbell	Arbroath	Bobby Linn	Arbroath
2019–20	Season was curtailed due to the COVID-19 pandemic.			
2020–21	Ian McCall	Partick Thistle	Mitch Megginson	Cove Rangers
2021–22	Paul Hartley	Cove Rangers	Mitch Megginson	Cove Rangers
2022–23	James McPake	Dunfermline Athletic	Kyle Benedictus	Dunfermline Athletic
2023–24	John McGlynn	Falkirk	Callumn Morrison	Falkirk
2024–25	David Gold and Colin Hamilton	Arbroath	Fraser Taylor	Arbroath
2025–26	Gary Naysmith	Stenhousemuir	Alfie Stewart	Inverness

Season	League Two Manager		League Two Player	
Season	Winner	Club	Winner	Club
2015–16	Gary Naysmith	East Fife	not awarded	
2016–17	Dick Campbell	Arbroath	Shane Sutherland	Elgin City
2017–18	Stewart Petrie	Montrose	Seán Dillon	Montrose
2018–19	Danny Lennon	Clyde	Blair Henderson	Edinburgh City
2019–20	Season was curtailed due to the COVID-19 pandemic.			
2020–21	Ray McKinnon	Queen's Park	Michael Doyle	Queen's Park
2021–22	Kevin Thomson	Kelty Hearts	Joe Cardle	Kelty Hearts
2022–23	Darren Young	Stirling Albion	Dale Carrick	Stirling Albion
2023–24	Gary Naysmith	Stenhousemuir	Gregor Buchanan	Stenhousemuir
2024–25	Jordon Brown and Ryan Strachan	Peterhead	Alan Trouten	East Fife
2025–26	Mick Kennedy	East Kilbride	John Robertson	East Kilbride

=== Tartan Ball and Boot ===
The Tartan Ball and Boot awards were awarded in 2018–19 (the only season to date) by the Scottish Professional Football League (SPFL) and are produced by the official SPFL matchday ball supplier, Mitre. The Tartan Ball is awarded to the highest goalscorer in each of the four SPFL divisions (Premiership, Championship, League One, and League Two). The Tartan Boot is awarded to the highest overall goalscorer of all four divisions.

Season	Tartan Ball												Tartan Boot			Ref
Season	Premiership			Championship			League One			League Two			SPFL (Tier I – IV)			Ref
2018–19	Alfredo Morelos	Rangers	18 Goals	Lawrence Shankland	Ayr United	24 Goals	Kevin Nisbet	Raith Rovers	30 Goals	Blair Henderson	Edinburgh City	30 Goals	Kevin Nisbet / Blair Henderson	Raith Rovers / Edinburgh City	30 Goals	

League sponsors cinch introduced a new set of top goalscorer awards in 2022–23.

Season	Tartan Ball												Ref
Season	Premiership			Championship			League One			League Two			Ref
2022–23	Kyogo Furuhashi	Celtic	27 Goals										
2023–24	Lawrence Shankland	Hearts	24 Goals	Brian Graham	Partick Thistle	20 Goals	Callumn Morrison	Falkirk	23 Goals	Blair Henderson	Spartans	18 Goals	

== See also ==
- List of Scottish Professional Football League monthly award winners
- Scottish Football League yearly awards
- Scottish Premier League Yearly Awards
