= 2019–20 Scottish Premiership =

Football league in Scotland

Scottish Premiership
- Season: 2019–20
- Dates: 3 August 2019 – 11 March 2020
- Champions: Celtic; 7th Premiership title 51st Scottish title
- Relegated: Hearts
- Champions League: Celtic
- Europa League: Rangers; Motherwell; Aberdeen
- Matches: 179
- Goals: 490 (2.74 per match)
- Top goalscorer: Odsonne Édouard (22 goals)
- Biggest home win: Celtic 7–0 St Johnstone (3 August 2019)
- Biggest away win: St Johnstone 0–4 Rangers (22 September 2019); Aberdeen 0–4 Celtic (27 October 2019); Ross County 0–4 Rangers (30 October 2019); Motherwell 0–4 Celtic (5 February 2020)
- Highest scoring: Celtic 7–0 St Johnstone (3 August 2019); Motherwell 2–5 Celtic (10 August 2019); Rangers 6–1 Hibernian (11 August 2019); Heart of Midlothian 5–2 St Mirren (9 November 2019)
- Longest winning run: 11 matches Celtic
- Longest unbeaten run: 16 matches Rangers
- Longest winless run: 11 matches Hamilton Academical
- Longest losing run: 7 matches Kilmarnock
- Highest attendance: 59,131; Celtic 2–1 Aberdeen (21 December 2019)
- Lowest attendance: 1,075; Hamilton Academical 2–1 Livingston (28 September 2019)
- Total attendance: 2,741,726
- Average attendance: 15,316(657)
- All statistics correct as of 11 March 2020.

The 2019–20 Scottish Premiership (known as the Ladbrokes Premiership for sponsorship reasons) was the seventh season of the Scottish Premiership, the highest division of Scottish football. The fixtures were published on 21 June 2019 and the season began on 3 August 2019. Celtic were the defending champions.

Twelve teams contested the league: Aberdeen, Celtic, Hamilton Academical, Heart of Midlothian, Hibernian, Kilmarnock, Livingston, Motherwell, Rangers, Ross County, St Johnstone and St Mirren.

On 13 March 2020, the Scottish football season was suspended with immediate effect due to the COVID-19 pandemic. The Premiership was curtailed on 18 May 2020, with average points per game used to determine final league positions. As a result, Celtic were awarded a ninth consecutive title, whilst Hearts were controversially demoted to the Championship, a decision which prompted the Edinburgh-based club to pursue ultimately unsuccessful legal action.

== Teams ==
The following teams have changed division since the 2018–19 season.

Promoted from Scottish Championship

- Ross County

Relegated to Scottish Championship

- Dundee

=== Stadia and locations ===
Aberdeen	Celtic	Hamilton Academical	Heart of Midlothian
Pittodrie Stadium	Celtic Park	New Douglas Park	Tynecastle Park
Capacity: 20,866	Capacity: 60,411	Capacity: 6,018	Capacity: 20,099
Hibernian	Location of teams in 2019–20 Scottish Premiership		Kilmarnock
Easter Road	Location of teams in 2019–20 Scottish Premiership		Rugby Park
Capacity: 20,421	Location of teams in 2019–20 Scottish Premiership		Capacity: 17,889
Livingston	Location of teams in 2019–20 Scottish Premiership		Motherwell
Almondvale Stadium	Location of teams in 2019–20 Scottish Premiership		Fir Park
Capacity: 9,512	Location of teams in 2019–20 Scottish Premiership		Capacity: 13,677
Rangers	Ross County	St Johnstone	St Mirren
Ibrox Stadium	Victoria Park	McDiarmid Park	St Mirren Park
Capacity: 50,817	Capacity: 6,541	Capacity: 10,696	Capacity: 7,937

=== Personnel and kits ===
Team	Manager	Captain	Kit manufacturer	Shirt sponsor
Aberdeen	(Scotland) Derek McInnes	(England) Joe Lewis	Adidas	Saltire Energy
Celtic	(Northern Ireland) Neil Lennon	(Scotland) Scott Brown	New Balance	Dafabet
Hamilton Academical	(Scotland) Brian Rice	(Scotland) Brian Easton	Adidas	Euro Mechanical Handling
Heart of Midlothian	(Germany) Daniel Stendel	(Scotland) Steven Naismith	Umbro	Save the Children
Hibernian	(Scotland) Jack Ross	(Scotland) David Gray	Macron	Hibernian Community Foundation
Kilmarnock	(England) Alex Dyer	(Republic of Ireland) Gary Dicker	Nike	QTS
Livingston	(Scotland) Gary Holt	(Scotland) Alan Lithgow	Nike	Phoenix Drilling Ltd
Motherwell	(Northern Ireland) Stephen Robinson	(England) Peter Hartley	Macron	Paddy Power (unbranded)
Rangers	(England) Steven Gerrard	(England) James Tavernier	Hummel	32Red
Ross County	(Scotland) Steven Ferguson and (Scotland) Stuart Kettlewell	(Scotland) Marcus Fraser	Macron	McEwan Fraser Legal
St Johnstone	(Scotland) Alec Cleland (caretaker)	(Scotland) Jason Kerr	Macron	Binn Group
St Mirren	(Republic of Ireland) Jim Goodwin	(Scotland) Stephen McGinn	Joma	Skyview Capital

=== Managerial changes ===
Team	Outgoing manager	Manner of departure	Date of vacancy	Position in table	Incoming manager	Date of appointment
Kilmarnock	(Scotland) Steve Clarke	Signed by Scotland	20 May 2019	Pre-season	(Italy) Angelo Alessio	16 June 2019
Celtic	(Northern Ireland) Neil Lennon	End of interim spell	25 May 2019	Pre-season	(Northern Ireland) Neil Lennon	31 May 2019
St Mirren	(Northern Ireland) Oran Kearney	Mutual consent	26 June 2019	Pre-season	(Republic of Ireland) Jim Goodwin	29 June 2019
Heart of Midlothian	(Scotland) Craig Levein	Sacked	31 October 2019	11th	(Germany) Daniel Stendel	7 December 2019
Hibernian	(England) Paul Heckingbottom	Sacked	4 November 2019	10th	(Scotland) Jack Ross	15 November 2019
Kilmarnock	(Italy) Angelo Alessio	Sacked	17 December 2019	5th	(England) Alex Dyer	30 December 2019
St Johnstone	(Northern Ireland) Tommy Wright	Resigned	2 May 2020	7th	(Scotland) Alec Cleland (caretaker)	2 May 2020

== Format ==
In the initial phase of the season, the 12 teams play a round-robin tournament whereby each team plays each one of the other teams three times. After 33 games, the league splits into two sections of six teams, with each team playing each other in that section. The league attempts to balance the fixture list so that teams in the same section play each other twice at home and twice away, but sometimes this is impossible. A total of 228 matches were due be played (38 matches by each team).

== League summary ==
=== League table ===
Pos	Team	Pld	W	D	L	GF	GA	GD	Pts	PPG	Qualification or relegation (Note: All play-off matches were cancelled, as clubs voted to curtail the season due to the COVID-19 pandemic.)
1	Celtic (C)	30	26	2	2	89	19	+70	80	2.67	Qualification for the Champions League first qualifying round
2	Rangers	29	21	4	4	64	19	+45	67	2.31	Qualification for the Europa League second qualifying round (Note: Since the 2019–20 Scottish Cup was postponed and could not be completed by the UEFA registration deadline of 3 August 2020, the spot awarded to the Scottish Cup winners (Europa League second qualifying round) was passed to the second-placed team, while the fourth-placed team also qualified for European competition.)
3	Motherwell	30	14	4	12	41	38	+3	46	1.53	Qualification for the Europa League first qualifying round
4	Aberdeen	30	12	9	9	40	36	+4	45	1.50	Qualification for the Europa League first qualifying round
5	Livingston	30	10	9	11	41	39	+2	39	1.30	
6	St Johnstone	29	8	12	9	28	46	−18	36	1.24	
7	Hibernian	30	9	10	11	42	49	−7	37	1.23	
8	Kilmarnock	30	9	6	15	31	41	−10	33	1.10	
9	St Mirren	30	7	8	15	24	41	−17	29	0.97	
10	Ross County	30	7	8	15	29	60	−31	29	0.97	
11	Hamilton Academical	30	6	9	15	30	50	−20	27	0.90	
12	Heart of Midlothian (R)	30	4	11	15	31	52	−21	23	0.77	Relegation to the Championship

Source: BBC SPFL
Rules for classification: 1) Points per game; 2) Goal difference; 3) Goals scored; 4) Head-to-head points; 5) Head-to-Head goal difference; 6) Play-off (only if deciding champion, UEFA competitions qualification, second stage group allocation or relegation).
(C) Champions; (R) Relegated

=== Positions by round ===
Team ╲ Round	1	2	3	4	5	6	7	8	9	10	11	12	13	14	15	16	17	18	19	20	21	22	23	24	25	26	27	28	29	30
Celtic	1	1	1	1	1	1	1	2	1	1	1	1	1	1	1	1	1	1	1	1	1	1	1	1	1	1	1	1	1	1
Rangers	4	2	2	2	2	2	2	1	2	2	2	2	2	2	2	2	2	2	2	2	2	2	2	2	2	2	2	2	2	2
Motherwell	6	10	6	5	3	4	3	3	3	4	3	3	4	4	4	4	3	4	3	3	3	3	3	3	3	4	4	3	3	3
Aberdeen	3	4	5	4	4	3	4	4	4	5	4	4	3	3	3	3	4	3	4	4	4	4	4	4	4	3	3	4	4	4
Livingston	7	8	3	3	5	6	6	6	7	7	6	7	8	8	7	8	7	8	6	7	5	5	5	5	5	5	5	5	5	5
St Johnstone	12	11	10	12	11	12	12	12	12	12	8	11	11	12	12	11	12	10	10	9	9	9	8	8	8	8	8	8	8	6
Hibernian	5	7	7	9	9	11	11	10	11	11	9	8	6	6	6	6	6	6	7	5	6	6	6	6	6	6	6	6	6	7
Kilmarnock	9	12	12	6	6	7	7	7	5	3	5	5	5	5	5	5	5	5	5	6	7	7	7	7	7	7	7	7	7	8
St Mirren	10	5	8	10	10	10	10	11	9	10	12	12	12	10	10	12	9	9	9	10	10	10	10	10	10	10	10	10	9	9
Ross County	2	3	4	8	7	5	5	5	6	6	7	6	7	7	8	7	8	7	8	8	8	8	9	9	9	9	9	9	10	10
Hamilton Academical	11	6	9	7	8	9	8	8	8	8	10	9	10	11	9	10	11	12	11	11	11	11	11	12	11	11	11	11	11	11
Heart of Midlothian	8	9	11	11	12	8	9	9	10	9	11	10	9	9	11	9	10	11	12	12	12	12	12	11	12	12	12	12	12	12

Leader and Champions League first qualifying round
Europa League second qualifying round
Europa League first qualifying round
Relegated to the Championship

== Results ==
=== Matches 1–22 ===
Teams play each other twice, once at home and once away.

Home \ Away	ABE	CEL	HAM	HOM	HIB	KIL	LIV	MOT	RAN	ROS	STJ	STM
Aberdeen	—	0–4	1–0	3–2	1–1	3–0	2–1	0–1	2–2	3–0	1–1	2–1
Celtic	2–1	—	2–1	3–1	2–0	3–1	4–0	2–0	1–2	6–0	7–0	2–0
Hamilton Academical	0–1	0–1	—	2–1	1–1	2–0	2–1	1–3	1–3	2–2	0–1	0–1
Heart of Midlothian	1–1	0–2	2–2	—	0–2	0–1	1–1	2–3	1–1	0–0	0–1	5–2
Hibernian	3–0	1–1	2–1	1–2	—	2–2	2–2	3–1	0–3	2–2	2–2	1–0
Kilmarnock	0–0	1–3	2–2	3–0	2–0	—	2–1	0–1	1–2	0–0	0–0	1–0
Livingston	0–2	2–0	0–0	0–0	2–0	3–0	—	0–0	0–2	4–0	1–0	2–1
Motherwell	0–3	2–5	1–2	1–0	3–0	2–1	2–1	—	0–2	1–2	4–0	2–0
Rangers	5–0	0–2	5–0	5–0	6–1	1–0	3–1	2–1	—	2–0	N/A	1–0
Ross County	1–3	1–4	3–0	0–0	2–1	1–0	1–4	1–2	0–4	—	2–2	2–1
St Johnstone	1–1	0–3	3–2	1–0	1–4	0–1	2–2	0–1	0–4	1–1	—	0–0
St Mirren	1–0	1–2	0–0	0–0	1–2	1–0	3–3	0–3	0–1	2–1	2–0	—

Source: SPFL
Legend: Blue = home team win; Yellow = draw; Red = away team win.
For upcoming matches, an "a" indicates there is an article about the rivalry between the two participants.

=== Matches 23–33 ===
Teams play each other once, either home or away.

Home \ Away	ABE	CEL	HAM	HOM	HIB	KIL	LIV	MOT	RAN	ROS	STJ	STM
Aberdeen	—	1–2	—	N/A	3–1	—	—	—	—	1–2	0–1	—
Celtic	—	—	—	5–0	—	3–1	—	—	—	3–0	N/A	5–0
Hamilton Academical	1–3	1–4	—	—	N/A	1–0	2–4	0–0	—	—	—	—
Heart of Midlothian	—	—	2–2	—	—	2–3	—	1–1	2–1	N/A	—	—
Hibernian	—	N/A	—	1–3	—	—	1–1	—	—	3–0	N/A	2–2
Kilmarnock	2–2	—	—	—	1–2	—	N/A	—	2–1	3–1	—	N/A
Livingston	N/A	2–2	—	N/A	—	—	—	1–0	—	—	—	2–1
Motherwell	N/A	0–4	—	—	0–0	N/A	—	—	—	4–1	—	1–2
Rangers	0–0	N/A	0–1	—	2–1	—	1–0	N/A	—	—	—	—
Ross County	—	—	N/A	—	—	—	2–0	—	0–1	—	1–1	N/A
St Johnstone	—	—	N/A	3–3	—	2–1	1–0	2–1	2–2	—	—	—
St Mirren	0–0	—	1–1	1–0	—	—	—	—	N/A	—	0–0	—

Source: SPFL
Legend: Blue = home team win; Yellow = draw; Red = away team win.
For upcoming matches, an "a" indicates there is an article about the rivalry between the two participants.

=== Matches 34–38 ===
It was intended that after 33 matches, the league would split into two sections of six teams i.e. the top six and the bottom six, with the teams playing every other team in their section once (either at home or away). The exact matches would be determined by the position of the teams in the league table at the time of the split. However, the season's premature finish, due to the COVID-19 pandemic, meant that this split was never applied.

== Season statistics ==
=== Scoring ===
==== Top scorers ====
Rank	Player	Club	Goals
1	(France) Odsonne Édouard	Celtic	22
2	(England) Jermain Defoe	Rangers	13
3	(Wales) Christian Doidge	Hibernian	12
3	(Colombia) Alfredo Morelos	Rangers	12
5	(England) Sam Cosgrove	Aberdeen	11
5	(Scotland) Ryan Christie	Celtic	11
7	(Scotland) James Forrest	Celtic	10

==== Hat-tricks ====
Player	For	Against	Score	Date
(Scotland) Ryan Christie	Celtic	St Johnstone	7–0 (H)	3 August 2019
(England) Jermain Defoe	Rangers	Hibernian	6–1 (H)	11 August 2019
(England) Jermain Defoe	Rangers	Hamilton Academical	5–0 (H)	6 October 2019
(Wales) Christian Doidge	Hibernian	St Johnstone	1–4 (A)	9 November 2019
(Scotland) Lyndon Dykes	Livingston	Ross County	4–0 (H)	21 December 2019
(Scotland) Leigh Griffiths	Celtic	St Mirren	5–0 (H)	7 March 2020

=== Attendances ===
These are the average attendances of the teams.

Pos	Team	Total	High	Low	Average	Change
1	Celtic	869,160	59,131	54,584	57,944	+0.3%
2	Rangers	689,327	50,012	47,583	49,237	−0.7%
3	Heart of Midlothian	251,262	19,313	14,681	16,750	−4.6%
4	Hibernian	250,923	20,197	14,486	16,728	−5.7%
5	Aberdeen	207,540	16,410	12,325	13,836	−7.3%
6	Kilmarnock	87,844	9,196	4,083	5,856	−15.1%
7	Motherwell	83,618	8,822	3,191	5,574	+2.3%
8	St Mirren	80,647	7,332	4,240	5,376	+0.5%
9	Ross County (Note: Club was playing in the Scottish Championship in the previous season.)	65,302	6,575	3,301	4,664	+21.2%
10	St Johnstone	65,461	8,743	2,231	4,091	+5.1%
11	Livingston	49,598	8,640	1,076	3,542	−3.3%
12	Hamilton Academical	41,044	5,300	1,075	2,565	−9.3%
	League total	2,741,726	59,131	1,075	15,316	−4.1%

== Awards ==
Month	Manager of the Month		Player of the Month		Ref.
Month	Manager	Club	Player	Club	Ref.
August	(Northern Ireland) Neil Lennon	Celtic	(France) Odsonne Édouard	Celtic	
September	(England) Steven Gerrard	Rangers	(Colombia) Alfredo Morelos	Rangers	
October	(Italy) Angelo Alessio	Kilmarnock	(Norway) Mohamed Elyounoussi	Celtic	
November	(Northern Ireland) Neil Lennon	Celtic	(Wales) Christian Doidge	Hibernian	
December	(England) Steven Gerrard	Rangers	(Australia) Martin Boyle	Hibernian	
January	(Scotland) Gary Holt	Livingston	(France) Odsonne Édouard	Celtic	
February	(Northern Ireland) Neil Lennon	Celtic	(Northern Ireland) Billy Mckay	Ross County	

=== Annual awards ===
Award	Winner	Club
SFWA Player of the Year	(France) Odsonne Édouard	Celtic
SFWA Young Player of the Year	(Scotland) Lewis Ferguson	Aberdeen
SFWA Manager of the Year	(Northern Ireland) Neil Lennon	Celtic
SFWA International Player of the Year	(Scotland) John McGinn	Aston Villa

SPFL Team of the Season
Goalkeeper	(England) Fraser Forster (Celtic)			
Defenders	(Netherlands) Jeremie Frimpong (Celtic)	(France) Christopher Jullien (Celtic)	(Norway) Kristoffer Ajer (Celtic)	(Croatia) Borna Barišić (Rangers)
Midfielders	(Scotland) Ryan Jack (Rangers)		(Scotland) Callum McGregor (Celtic)	(Scotland) James Forrest (Celtic)
Forwards	(Norway) Mohamed Elyounoussi (Celtic)		(Colombia) Alfredo Morelos (Rangers)	(France) Odsonne Édouard (Celtic)

== Broadcasting ==
=== Live matches ===
The SPFL permits Sky Sports and BT Sport up to six live home matches between the broadcasters from each club - although this is only four for Rangers and Celtic. Sky Sports and BT Sport's deal allows them to broadcast 30 games each (and the play-offs for BT). The deal roughly provides £21m to SPFL per season. This is the final season of the contract; from 2020–21, Sky Sports will have exclusive rights to Scottish Premiership matches.

=== Highlights ===
Sky Sports hold the rights to Saturday night highlights - however, they do not broadcast a dedicated programme and instead merely show the goals of the Premiership matches on Sky Sports News in their Goals Express programme - which primarily is focused on goals from the English Football League. Gaelic-language channel BBC Alba has the rights to broadcast the repeat in full of 38 Saturday 3pm matches "as live" at 5.30pm. The main Premiership highlights programme is BBC Scotland's Sportscene programme, which shows in-depth highlights of all six Premiership matches every weekend. The SPFL also uploads the goals from every Premiership match onto its YouTube channel - available from 6pm on a Sunday for UK and Ireland viewers and 10pm on a Saturday for those worldwide.
