= 2017–18 Scottish Premiership =

Football league in Scotland

Scottish Premiership
- Season: 2017–18
- Dates: 5 August 2017 – 13 May 2018
- Champions: Celtic; 5th Premiership title 49th Scottish title
- Relegated: Partick Thistle; Ross County
- Champions League: Celtic
- Europa League: Aberdeen; Rangers; Hibernian
- Matches: 228
- Goals: 594 (2.61 per match)
- Top goalscorer: Kris Boyd (18 goals)
- Biggest home win: Celtic 5–0 Rangers (29 April 2018)
- Biggest away win: St Johnstone 0–4 Celtic (4 November 2017); Dundee 0–4 St Johnstone (10 March 2018); Motherwell 1–5 St Johnstone (5 May 2018)
- Highest scoring: Hibernian 5–5 Rangers (13 May 2018)
- Longest winning run: 6 matches: Kilmarnock
- Longest unbeaten run: 17 matches: Celtic
- Longest winless run: 12 matches: Ross County
- Longest losing run: 6 matches: Hamilton Academical
- Highest attendance: 59,259; Celtic 2–2 Hibernian (30 September 2017)
- Lowest attendance: 1,272; Hamilton Academical 3–2 Ross County (16 December 2017)
- Total attendance: 3,632,642
- Average attendance: 15,932 (1,963)
- All statistics correct as of 13 May 2018.

The 2017–18 Scottish Premiership (known as the Ladbrokes Premiership for sponsorship reasons) was the fifth season of the Scottish Premiership, the highest division of Scottish football. The fixtures were published on 23 June 2017. The season began on 5 August 2017. Celtic were the defending champions.

Twelve teams contested the league: Aberdeen, Celtic, Dundee, Hamilton Academical, Heart of Midlothian, Hibernian, Kilmarnock, Motherwell, Partick Thistle, Rangers, Ross County and St Johnstone.

The season's average attendance was 15,932, the highest level since 2006–07.

On 29 April 2018, Celtic won their seventh consecutive title and 49th overall after a 5–0 win at home to Rangers.

== Teams ==
The following teams have changed division since the 2016–17 season.

=== To Premiership ===
Promoted from Scottish Championship

- Hibernian

=== From Premiership ===
Relegated to Scottish Championship

- Inverness Caledonian Thistle

=== Stadia and locations ===
| Aberdeen | Celtic | Dundee | Hamilton Academical |
|---|---|---|---|
| Pittodrie Stadium | Celtic Park | Dens Park | New Douglas Park |
| Capacity: 20,866 | Capacity: 60,411 | Capacity: 11,506 | Capacity: 5,510 |
| Heart of Midlothian | Location of teams in 2017–18 Scottish Premiership | | Hibernian |
| Tynecastle Park | Location of teams in 2017–18 Scottish Premiership | | Easter Road |
| Capacity: 20,099 | Location of teams in 2017–18 Scottish Premiership | | Capacity: 20,421 |
| Kilmarnock | Location of teams in 2017–18 Scottish Premiership | | Motherwell |
| Rugby Park | Location of teams in 2017–18 Scottish Premiership | | Fir Park |
| Capacity: 17,889 | Location of teams in 2017–18 Scottish Premiership | | Capacity: 13,677 |
| Partick Thistle | Rangers | Ross County | St Johnstone |
| Firhill Stadium | Ibrox Stadium | Victoria Park | McDiarmid Park |
| Capacity: 10,102 | Capacity: 50,817 | Capacity: 6,541 | Capacity: 10,696 |

=== Personnel and kits ===
| Team | Manager | Captain | Kit manufacturer | Shirt sponsor |
|---|---|---|---|---|
| Aberdeen | (Scotland) Derek McInnes | (Scotland) Graeme Shinnie | Adidas | Saltire Energy |
| Celtic | (Northern Ireland) Brendan Rodgers | (Scotland) Scott Brown | New Balance | Dafabet |
| Dundee | (Scotland) Neil McCann | (Republic of Ireland) Darren O'Dea | Puma | McEwan Fraser Legal |
| Hamilton Academical | (Scotland) Martin Canning | (Scotland) Dougie Imrie | Adidas | SuperSeal (H), NetBet (A) |
| Heart of Midlothian | (Scotland) Craig Levein | (Scotland) Christophe Berra | Umbro | Save the Children |
| Hibernian | (Northern Ireland) Neil Lennon | (Scotland) David Gray | Macron | Marathonbet |
| Kilmarnock | (Scotland) Steve Clarke | (Scotland) Steven Smith | Nike | QTS |
| Motherwell | (Northern Ireland) Steve Robinson | (Republic of Ireland) Carl McHugh | Macron | McEwan Fraser Legal |
| Partick Thistle | (Scotland) Alan Archibald | (Ghana) Abdul Osman | Joma | Just Employment Law |
| Rangers | (Northern Ireland) Jimmy Nicholl (interim) | (Scotland) Lee Wallace | Puma | 32Red |
| Ross County | (Scotland) Steven Ferguson and (Scotland) Stuart Kettlewell | (England) Andrew Davies | Macron | Stanley CRC Evans Offshore |
| St Johnstone | (Northern Ireland) Tommy Wright | (Scotland) Steven Anderson | Joma | Alan Storrar Cars |

=== Managerial changes ===
| Team | Outgoing manager | Manner of departure | Date of vacancy | Position in table | Incoming manager | Date of appointment |
|---|---|---|---|---|---|---|
| Dundee | (Scotland) Neil McCann | End of interim | 20 May 2017 | Pre-season | (Scotland) Neil McCann | 1 June 2017 |
| Kilmarnock | (Scotland) Lee McCulloch | End of interim | 20 May 2017 | Pre-season | (Scotland) Lee McCulloch | 5 June 2017 |
| Heart of Midlothian | (Scotland) Ian Cathro | Sacked | 1 August 2017 | Pre-season | (Scotland) Craig Levein | 28 August 2017 |
| Ross County | (Scotland) Jim McIntyre | Sacked | 25 September 2017 | 10th | (Republic of Ireland) Owen Coyle | 28 September 2017 |
| Kilmarnock | (Scotland) Lee McCulloch | Resigned | 1 October 2017 | 12th | (Scotland) Steve Clarke | 14 October 2017 |
| Rangers | (Portugal) Pedro Caixinha | Sacked | 26 October 2017 | 4th | (Scotland) Graeme Murty (interim) | 26 October 2017 |
| Rangers | (Scotland) Graeme Murty | End of interim | 22 December 2017 | 3rd | (Scotland) Graeme Murty | 22 December 2017 |
| Ross County | (Republic of Ireland) Owen Coyle | Resigned | 1 March 2018 | 12th | (Scotland) Steven Ferguson and (Scotland) Stuart Kettlewell | 2 March 2018 |
| Rangers | (Scotland) Graeme Murty | Sacked | 1 May 2018 | 3rd | (Northern Ireland) Jimmy Nicholl (interim) | 1 May 2018 |

== Format ==
=== Basic ===
In the initial phase of the season, the 12 teams will play a round-robin tournament whereby each team plays each one of the other teams three times. After 33 games, the league splits into two sections of six teams, with each team playing each other in that section. The league attempts to balance the fixture list so that teams in the same section play each other twice at home and twice away, but sometimes this is impossible. A total of 228 matches will be played, with 38 matches played by each team.

=== Prize money ===
In April 2018, the SPFL confirmed the prize money to be allocated to the league members at the conclusion of the competitions. The Premiership winners would receive £3.176 million, with a total pot of £24.5m to be distributed across the four divisions.

== League summary ==
=== League table ===
| Pos | Team | Pld | W | D | L | GF | GA | GD | Pts | Qualification or relegation (Note: Teams play each other three times (33 matches) before the league is split into two groups (the top six and the bottom six).) |
|---|---|---|---|---|---|---|---|---|---|---|
| 1 | Celtic (C) | 38 | 24 | 10 | 4 | 73 | 25 | +48 | 82 | Qualification for the Champions League first qualifying round (Note: Since the winners of the 2017–18 Scottish Cup, Celtic, qualified for European competition based on league position, the spot awarded to the Scottish Cup winners (Europa League second qualifying round) was passed to the second-placed team and the spot awarded to the second-placed team (Europa League first qualifying round) was passed to the fourth-placed team.) |
| 2 | Aberdeen | 38 | 22 | 7 | 9 | 56 | 37 | +19 | 73 | Qualification for the Europa League second qualifying round |
| 3 | Rangers | 38 | 21 | 7 | 10 | 76 | 50 | +26 | 70 | Qualification for the Europa League first qualifying round |
| 4 | Hibernian | 38 | 18 | 13 | 7 | 62 | 46 | +16 | 67 | Qualification for the Europa League first qualifying round |
| 5 | Kilmarnock | 38 | 16 | 11 | 11 | 49 | 47 | +2 | 59 | |
| 6 | Heart of Midlothian | 38 | 12 | 13 | 13 | 39 | 39 | 0 | 49 | |
| 7 | Motherwell | 38 | 13 | 9 | 16 | 43 | 49 | −6 | 48 | |
| 8 | St Johnstone | 38 | 12 | 10 | 16 | 42 | 53 | −11 | 46 | |
| 9 | Dundee | 38 | 11 | 6 | 21 | 36 | 57 | −21 | 39 | |
| 10 | Hamilton Academical | 38 | 9 | 6 | 23 | 47 | 68 | −21 | 33 | |
| 11 | Partick Thistle (R) | 38 | 8 | 9 | 21 | 31 | 61 | −30 | 33 | Qualification for the Premiership play-off final |
| 12 | Ross County (R) | 38 | 6 | 11 | 21 | 40 | 62 | −22 | 29 | Relegation to the Championship |

Source: Soccerway BBC
Rules for classification: 1) Points; 2) Goal difference; 3) Goals scored; 4) Play-off (only if deciding champion, UEFA competitions qualification and second-stage group allocation).
(C) Champions; (R) Relegated

=== Positions by round ===
The table lists the positions of teams after each week of matches. In order to preserve chronological progress, any postponed matches are not included in the round at which they were originally scheduled, but added to the full round they were played immediately afterwards. For example, if a match is scheduled for matchday 13, but then postponed and played between days 16 and 17, it will be added to the standings for day 16.

| Leader – Qualification to Champions League first qualifying round |
| Qualification to Europa League first qualifying round |
| Qualification to Premiership play-off final |
| Relegation to 2018–19 Scottish Championship |

| Team \ Round | 1 | 2 | 3 | 4 | 5 | 6 | 7 | 8 | 9 | 10 | 11 | 12 | 13 | 14 | 15 | 16 | 17 | 18 | 19 | 20 | 21 | 22 | 23 | 24 | 25 | 26 | 27 | 28 | 29 | 30 | 31 | 32 | 33 | 34 | 35 | 36 | 37 | 38 |
|---|---|---|---|---|---|---|---|---|---|---|---|---|---|---|---|---|---|---|---|---|---|---|---|---|---|---|---|---|---|---|---|---|---|---|---|---|---|---|
| Celtic | 1 | 2 | 1 | 2 | 1 | 1 | 1 | 1 | 1 | 1 | 1 | 1 | 1 | 1 | 1 | 1 | 1 | 1 | 1 | 1 | 1 | 1 | 1 | 1 | 1 | 1 | 1 | 1 | 1 | 1 | 1 | 1 | 1 | 1 | 1 | 1 | 1 | 1 |
| Aberdeen | 3 | 4 | 3 | 1 | 2 | 2 | 2 | 2 | 2 | 2 | 2 | 2 | 2 | 2 | 2 | 3 | 3 | 3 | 2 | 2 | 2 | 2 | 3 | 3 | 2 | 2 | 3 | 3 | 3 | 3 | 3 | 2 | 3 | 3 | 2 | 2 | 2 | 2 |
| Rangers | 4 | 6 | 6 | 5 | 4 | 3 | 5 | 3 | 3 | 3 | 4 | 4 | 4 | 4 | 3 | 2 | 2 | 2 | 3 | 3 | 3 | 3 | 2 | 2 | 3 | 3 | 2 | 2 | 2 | 2 | 2 | 3 | 2 | 2 | 3 | 3 | 3 | 3 |
| Hibernian | 2 | 3 | 5 | 6 | 6 | 6 | 4 | 6 | 6 | 7 | 5 | 3 | 3 | 3 | 4 | 4 | 4 | 4 | 4 | 4 | 4 | 4 | 4 | 4 | 4 | 4 | 4 | 4 | 4 | 4 | 4 | 4 | 4 | 4 | 4 | 4 | 4 | 4 |
| Kilmarnock | 8 | 9 | 10 | 10 | 11 | 12 | 12 | 12 | 11 | 11 | 11 | 11 | 10 | 10 | 10 | 10 | 8 | 8 | 8 | 6 | 7 | 6 | 7 | 7 | 7 | 7 | 6 | 5 | 5 | 5 | 5 | 5 | 5 | 5 | 5 | 5 | 5 | 5 |
| Heart of Midlothian | 12 | 8 | 7 | 8 | 8 | 7 | 7 | 7 | 7 | 5 | 7 | 7 | 6 | 7 | 7 | 6 | 6 | 5 | 5 | 5 | 5 | 5 | 5 | 5 | 5 | 5 | 5 | 6 | 6 | 6 | 6 | 6 | 6 | 6 | 6 | 6 | 6 | 6 |
| Motherwell | 9 | 11 | 8 | 7 | 5 | 5 | 6 | 5 | 4 | 4 | 3 | 5 | 5 | 5 | 5 | 5 | 5 | 6 | 7 | 8 | 8 | 8 | 6 | 6 | 6 | 6 | 7 | 7 | 7 | 7 | 8 | 7 | 7 | 7 | 7 | 7 | 7 | 7 |
| St Johnstone | 6 | 1 | 2 | 3 | 3 | 4 | 3 | 4 | 5 | 6 | 6 | 6 | 7 | 6 | 6 | 7 | 7 | 7 | 6 | 7 | 6 | 7 | 8 | 8 | 8 | 8 | 9 | 8 | 8 | 8 | 7 | 8 | 8 | 8 | 8 | 8 | 8 | 8 |
| Dundee | 7 | 12 | 12 | 11 | 12 | 9 | 9 | 8 | 8 | 9 | 10 | 12 | 12 | 12 | 11 | 9 | 10 | 11 | 10 | 10 | 10 | 10 | 10 | 9 | 9 | 9 | 8 | 9 | 10 | 10 | 10 | 10 | 10 | 9 | 10 | 9 | 9 | 9 |
| Hamilton Academical | 11 | 5 | 4 | 4 | 7 | 8 | 8 | 9 | 9 | 10 | 9 | 8 | 9 | 8 | 8 | 8 | 9 | 9 | 9 | 9 | 9 | 9 | 9 | 10 | 10 | 11 | 11 | 10 | 9 | 9 | 9 | 9 | 9 | 10 | 9 | 10 | 10 | 10 |
| Partick Thistle | 10 | 10 | 11 | 12 | 10 | 11 | 11 | 11 | 12 | 12 | 12 | 10 | 11 | 11 | 12 | 12 | 12 | 12 | 12 | 11 | 12 | 11 | 11 | 11 | 11 | 10 | 10 | 11 | 11 | 11 | 11 | 12 | 12 | 11 | 11 | 11 | 11 | 11 |
| Ross County | 5 | 7 | 9 | 9 | 9 | 10 | 10 | 10 | 10 | 8 | 8 | 9 | 8 | 9 | 9 | 11 | 11 | 10 | 11 | 12 | 11 | 12 | 12 | 12 | 12 | 12 | 12 | 12 | 12 | 12 | 12 | 11 | 11 | 12 | 12 | 12 | 12 | 12 |

Source: BBC Sport

== Results ==
=== Matches 1–22 ===
Teams play each other twice, once at home and once away.

| Home \ Away | ABE | CEL | DND | HAM | HOM | HIB | KIL | MOT | PAR | RAN | ROS | STJ |
|---|---|---|---|---|---|---|---|---|---|---|---|---|
| Aberdeen | — | 0–3 | 2–1 | 2–0 | 0–0 | 4–1 | 1–1 | 0–2 | 1–0 | 1–2 | 2–1 | 3–0 |
| Celtic | 3–0 | — | 1–0 | 3–1 | 4–1 | 2–2 | 1–1 | 5–1 | 2–0 | 0–0 | 4–0 | 1–1 |
| Dundee | 0–1 | 0–2 | — | 1–3 | 2–1 | 1–1 | 0–0 | 0–1 | 3–0 | 2–1 | 1–2 | 3–2 |
| Hamilton Academical | 2–2 | 1–4 | 3–0 | — | 1–2 | 1–1 | 1–2 | 1–2 | 0–0 | 1–4 | 3–2 | 0–1 |
| Heart of Midlothian | 0–0 | 4–0 | 2–0 | 1–1 | — | 0–0 | 1–2 | 1–0 | 1–1 | 1–3 | 0–0 | 1–0 |
| Hibernian | 0–1 | 2–2 | 2–1 | 1–3 | 1–0 | — | 1–1 | 2–2 | 3–1 | 1–2 | 2–1 | 1–2 |
| Kilmarnock | 1–3 | 0–2 | 1–1 | 2–2 | 0–1 | 0–3 | — | 1–0 | 5–1 | 2–1 | 0–2 | 1–2 |
| Motherwell | 0–1 | 1–1 | 1–1 | 1–3 | 2–1 | 0–1 | 2–0 | — | 3–0 | 1–2 | 2–0 | 2–0 |
| Partick Thistle | 3–4 | 0–1 | 2–1 | 1–0 | 1–1 | 0–1 | 0–2 | 3–2 | — | 2–2 | 2–0 | 1–0 |
| Rangers | 3–0 | 0–2 | 4–1 | 0–2 | 0–0 | 2–3 | 1–1 | 2–0 | 3–0 | — | 2–1 | 1–3 |
| Ross County | 1–2 | 0–1 | 0–2 | 2–1 | 1–2 | 0–1 | 2–2 | 3–2 | 1–1 | 1–3 | — | 1–1 |
| St Johnstone | 0–3 | 0–4 | 0–2 | 2–1 | 0–0 | 1–1 | 1–2 | 4–1 | 1–0 | 0–3 | 0–0 | — |

Source: Scottish Premiership
Legend: Blue = home team win; Yellow = draw; Red = away team win.
For upcoming matches, an "a" indicates there is an article about the rivalry between the two participants.

=== Matches 23–33 ===
Teams play every other team once (either at home or away).

| Home \ Away | ABE | CEL | DND | HAM | HOM | HIB | KIL | MOT | PAR | RAN | ROS | STJ |
|---|---|---|---|---|---|---|---|---|---|---|---|---|
| Aberdeen | — | 0–2 | 1–0 | 3–0 | — | — | 3–1 | — | — | — | — | 4–1 |
| Celtic | — | — | 0–0 | — | 3–1 | 1–0 | — | — | — | — | 3–0 | 0–0 |
| Dundee | — | — | — | — | 1–1 | 0–1 | — | 0–1 | — | — | 1–4 | 0–4 |
| Hamilton Academical | — | 1–2 | 1–2 | — | 0–3 | — | — | 2–0 | 2–1 | 3–5 | — | — |
| Heart of Midlothian | 2–0 | — | — | — | — | — | 1–1 | 1–1 | 3–0 | — | — | 1–0 |
| Hibernian | 2–0 | — | — | 3–1 | 2–0 | — | — | 2–1 | 2–0 | — | — | — |
| Kilmarnock | — | 1–0 | 3–2 | 2–0 | — | 2–2 | — | — | — | — | 3–2 | 2–0 |
| Motherwell | 0–2 | 0–0 | — | — | — | — | 0–1 | — | 1–1 | 2–2 | 2–0 | — |
| Partick Thistle | 0–0 | 1–2 | 1–2 | — | — | — | 0–1 | — | — | 0–2 | — | — |
| Rangers | 2–0 | 2–3 | 4–0 | — | 2–0 | 1–2 | 0–1 | — | — | — | — | — |
| Ross County | 2–4 | — | — | 2–2 | 1–1 | 1–1 | — | — | 4–0 | 1–2 | — | — |
| St Johnstone | — | — | — | 1–0 | — | 1–1 | — | 0–0 | 1–3 | 1–4 | 2–0 | — |

Source: Scottish Premiership
Legend: Blue = home team win; Yellow = draw; Red = away team win.
For upcoming matches, an "a" indicates there is an article about the rivalry between the two participants.

=== Matches 34–38 ===
After 33 matches, the league splits into two sections of six teams i.e. the top six and the bottom six, with the teams playing every other team in their section once (either at home or away). The exact matches are determined by the position of the teams in the league table at the time of the split.

==== Top six ====
| Home \ Away | ABE | CEL | HOM | HIB | KIL | RAN |
|---|---|---|---|---|---|---|
| Aberdeen | — | — | 2–0 | 0–0 | — | 1–1 |
| Celtic | 0–1 | — | — | — | 0–0 | 5–0 |
| Heart of Midlothian | — | 1–3 | — | 2–1 | — | — |
| Hibernian | — | 2–1 | — | — | 5–3 | 5–5 |
| Kilmarnock | 0–2 | — | 1–0 | — | — | — |
| Rangers | — | — | 2–1 | — | 1–0 | — |

Source: Scottish Premiership
Legend: Blue = home team win; Yellow = draw; Red = away team win.
For upcoming matches, an "a" indicates there is an article about the rivalry between the two participants.

==== Bottom six ====
| Home \ Away | DND | HAM | MOT | PAR | ROS | STJ |
|---|---|---|---|---|---|---|
| Dundee | — | 1–0 | — | 0–1 | — | 2–1 |
| Hamilton Academical | — | — | — | — | 2–0 | 1–2 |
| Motherwell | 2–1 | 3–0 | — | — | — | 1–5 |
| Partick Thistle | — | 2–1 | 0–1 | — | 1–1 | — |
| Ross County | 0–1 | — | 0–0 | — | — | — |
| St Johnstone | — | — | — | 1–1 | 1–1 | — |

Source: Scottish Premiership
Legend: Blue = home team win; Yellow = draw; Red = away team win.
For upcoming matches, an "a" indicates there is an article about the rivalry between the two participants.

== Season statistics ==
=== Top scorers ===
As of matches played on 13 May 2018

| Rank | Player | Club | Goals |
|---|---|---|---|
| 1 | (Scotland) Kris Boyd | Kilmarnock | 18 |
| 2 | (Colombia) Alfredo Morelos | Rangers | 14 |
| 3 | (England) Josh Windass | Rangers | 13 |
| 4 | (Northern Ireland) Kyle Lafferty | Heart of Midlothian | 12 |
| 5 | (Netherlands) Alex Schalk | Ross County | 11 |
| 6 | (England) Scott Sinclair | Celtic | 10 |

=== Hat-tricks ===
| Player | For | Against | Result | Date | Reference |
|---|---|---|---|---|---|
| (Republic of Ireland) Adam Rooney | Aberdeen | St Johnstone | 3–0 | 30 September 2017 | |
| (France) Odsonne Édouard | Celtic | Motherwell | 5–1 | 2 December 2017 | |
| (Scotland) Gary Mackay-Steven | Aberdeen | Hibernian | 4–1 | 16 December 2017 | |
| (England) Josh Windass | Rangers | Hamilton Academical | 5–3 | 18 February 2018 | |
| (Switzerland) Florian Kamberi | Hibernian | Hamilton Academical | 3–1 | 3 April 2018 | |
| (Netherlands) Alex Schalk | Ross County | Partick Thistle | 4–0 | 3 April 2018 | |
| (Scotland) Steven MacLean | St Johnstone | Motherwell | 5–1 | 5 May 2018 | |
| (Australia) Jamie Maclaren | Hibernian | Rangers | 5–5 | 13 May 2018 | |

=== Discipline ===
==== Player ====
===== Yellow cards =====
As of matches played on 13 May 2018

| Rank | Player | Club | Cards |
|---|---|---|---|
| 1 | (Scotland) Graeme Shinnie | Aberdeen | 15 |
| 1 | (Scotland) John McGinn | Hibernian | 15 |
| 3 | (Scotland) Murray Davidson | St Johnstone | 14 |
| 4 | (Northern Ireland) Kyle Lafferty | Heart of Midlothian | 12 |
| 4 | (Republic of Ireland) Carl McHugh | Motherwell | 12 |
| 6 | (Scotland) John Souttar | Heart of Midlothian | 10 |

===== Red cards =====
As of matches played on 13 May 2018

| Rank | Player | Club | Cards |
|---|---|---|---|
| 1 | (Scotland) Ryan Jack | Rangers | 4 |
| 2 | (Republic of Ireland) Darren O'Dea | Dundee | 2 |
| 3 | 38 players | | 1 |

==== Club ====
===== Yellow cards =====
As of matches played on 13 May 2018

| Rank | Club | Cards |
|---|---|---|
| 1 | Heart of Midlothian | 86 |
| 2 | Hamilton Academical | 82 |
| 3 | Rangers | 81 |

===== Red cards =====
As of matches played on 13 May 2018

| Rank | Club | Cards |
|---|---|---|
| 1 | Hamilton Academical | 9 |
| 2 | Heart of Midlothian | 5 |
| 2 | Motherwell | 5 |
| 2 | Rangers | 5 |
| 5 | St Johnstone | 4 |

=== Attendances ===
These are the average attendances of the teams.

| Pos | Team | Total | High | Low | Average | Change |
|---|---|---|---|---|---|---|
| 1 | Celtic | 1,096,356 | 59,259 | 53,883 | 57,702 | +5.6% |
| 2 | Rangers | 934,298 | 50,215 | 47,272 | 49,173 | +0.6% |
| 3 | Heart of Midlothian | 331,725 | 32,852 | 15,357 | 18,429 | +12.9% |
| 4 | Hibernian | 344,355 | 20,193 | 15,459 | 18,123 | +17.7% |
| 5 | Aberdeen | 299,734 | 20,528 | 13,531 | 15,775 | +24.8% |
| 6 | Dundee | 113,000 | 9,193 | 4,863 | 5,947 | −7.5% |
| 7 | Motherwell | 108,969 | 9,974 | 3,196 | 5,448 | +21.5% |
| 8 | Kilmarnock | 102,424 | 11,490 | 3,337 | 5,390 | +8.6% |
| 9 | Ross County | 86,260 | 6,590 | 3,021 | 4,540 | +10.7% |
| 10 | Partick Thistle | 84,393 | 8,264 | 2,452 | 4,441 | +3.7% |
| 11 | St Johnstone | 72,371 | 6,887 | 2,037 | 3,809 | −13.3% |
| 12 | Hamilton Academical | 58,807 | 5,406 | 1,272 | 3,095 | +22.3% |
| | League total | 3,632,642 | 59,259 | 1,272 | 15,932 | +14.1% |

Updated to games played on 13 May 2018

== Awards ==
| Month | Manager of the Month | | Player of the Month | | Ref. |
| Month | Manager | Club | Player | Club | Ref. |
|---|---|---|---|---|---|
| August | (Northern Ireland) Tommy Wright | St Johnstone | (Scotland) Michael O'Halloran | St Johnstone | |
| September | (Northern Ireland) Brendan Rodgers | Celtic | (England) Louis Moult | Motherwell | |
| October | (Northern Ireland) Neil Lennon | Hibernian | (Scotland) Kieran Tierney | Celtic | |
| November | (Scotland) Martin Canning | Hamilton Academical | (Scotland) David Templeton | Hamilton Academical | |
| December | (Scotland) Steve Clarke | Kilmarnock | (Scotland) Kris Boyd | Kilmarnock | |
| January | No awards due to winter break | | | | |
| February | (Scotland) Steve Clarke | Kilmarnock | (England) Josh Windass | Rangers | |
| March | (Scotland) Steve Clarke | Kilmarnock | (Scotland) Stephen O'Donnell | Kilmarnock | |

=== Annual awards ===
| Award | Winner | Club |
|---|---|---|
| William Hill Premiership Player of the Year | (Scotland) Scott Brown | Celtic |
| PFA Scotland Premiership Player of the Year | (Scotland) Scott Brown | Celtic |
| PFA Scotland SPFL Young Player of the Year | (Scotland) Kieran Tierney | Celtic |
| PFA Scotland SPFL Manager of the Year | (Scotland) Jack Ross | St Mirren |
| PFA Scotland Goal of the Season | (Scotland) Kieran Tierney | Celtic |
| SFWA Player of the Year | (Scotland) Scott Brown | Celtic |

PFA Scotland Team of the Year
| Goalkeeper | (England) Jon McLaughlin (Heart of Midlothian) | | | |
| Defenders | (England) James Tavernier (Rangers) | (Scotland) Christophe Berra (Heart of Midlothian) | (Scotland) Scott McKenna (Aberdeen) | (Scotland) Kieran Tierney (Celtic) |
| Midfielders | (Scotland) James Forrest (Celtic) | | (Scotland) John McGinn (Hibernian) | (Scotland) Scott Brown (Celtic) |
| Forwards | (Scotland) Dylan McGeouch (Hibernian) | | (Northern Ireland) Jordan Jones (Kilmarnock) | (Scotland) Kris Boyd (Kilmarnock) |

== Premiership play-offs ==
The quarter-final was contested between the third and fourth-placed teams (Dundee United and Dunfermline Athletic) in the Scottish Championship, with the winners advancing to the semi-final to face the second-placed Championship side (Livingston). The last remaining Championship team played off against the eleventh-placed Premiership team in the final, with the winners securing the last place in the 2018–19 Scottish Premiership.

Quarter-final
3 | Dundee United | 0 | 2 | 2
4 | Dunfermline Athletic | 0 | 1 | 1

Semi-final
2 | Livingston | 3 | 1 | 4
3 | Dundee United | 2 | 1 | 3

Final
1 | Partick Thistle | 1 | 0 | 1
2 | Livingston | 2 | 1 | 3

=== Quarter-final ===
==== First leg ====
| 1 May 2018 | Dunfermline Athletic | 0–0 | Dundee United | Dunfermline |
| 19:45 | | BBC Report | | Stadium: East End Park; Attendance: 6,474; Referee: Bobby Madden |

==== Second leg ====
| 4 May 2018 | Dundee United | 2–1 (2–1 agg.) | Dunfermline Athletic | Dundee |
| 19:45 | McDonald 57'; Stanton 70' | BBC Report | McManus 14' | Stadium: Tannadice Park; Attendance: 7,994; Referee: Willie Collum |

=== Semi-final ===
==== First leg ====
| 7 May 2018 | Dundee United | 2–3 | Livingston | Dundee |
| 19:45 | Mikkelsen 3'; Ralston 28' | BBC Report | De Vita 2'; Mullin 77'; Pittman 80' | Stadium: Tannadice Park; Attendance: 5,610; Referee: Nick Walsh |

==== Second leg ====
| 11 May 2018 | Livingston | 1–1 (4–3 agg.) | Dundee United | Livingston |
| 19:45 | Lithgow 6' | BBC Report | Fraser 21' | Stadium: Almondvale Stadium; Attendance: 4,508; Referee: Don Robertson |

=== Final ===
==== First leg ====
| 17 May 2018 | Livingston | 2–1 | Partick Thistle | Livingston |
| 19:45 | Jacobs 13'; Pittman 74' | BBC Report | Doolan 10' | Stadium: Almondvale Stadium; Attendance: 5,469; Referee: Craig Thomson |

==== Second leg ====
| 20 May 2018 | Partick Thistle | 0–1 (1–3 agg.) | Livingston | Glasgow |
| 15:30 | | Report | Jacobs 46' | Stadium: Firhill Stadium; Attendance: 7,122; Referee: John Beaton |

Livingston were promoted to the Premiership.

== Broadcasting ==
=== Live Matches ===
The SPFL permitted Sky Sports and BT Sport to show up to six live home matches between the broadcasters from each club - although this was only four for Rangers and Celtic. Sky Sports and BT Sport's deals allowed them to broadcast 30 games each (and the play-offs for BT). The deal roughly provided £21m to SPFL per season.

=== Highlights ===
Sky Sports held the rights to Saturday night highlights - however, they did not broadcast a dedicated programme and instead merely showed the goals of the Premiership matches on Sky Sports News in their Goals Express programme primarily focused on goals from the English Football League. Gaelic-language channel BBC Alba had the rights to broadcast the repeat in full of 38 Saturday 3pm matches "as live" at 5.30pm. The main Premiership highlights programme was BBC Scotland's Sportscene programme, hosted on Sundays, which showed in depth highlights of all six Premiership matches every weekend. STV showed the goals from the weekend matches on Monday nights during the Sport section of their News at Six programme as well as during their weeknight football-debate show on STV2. The SPFL also uploaded the goals from every Premiership match onto its YouTube channel, available from 6pm on a Sunday for UK and Ireland viewers and 10pm on a Saturday for those worldwide.

== See also ==
- Nine in a row
