= Highland derby =

Football rivalry in the Scottish Highlands

Highland Derby
- Other names: El Kessocko, The Cold Firm
- Location: Scottish Highlands
- Teams: Inverness Caledonian Thistle and Ross County
- First meeting: 27 August 1994, (Ross County 1–3 Inverness Caledonian Thistle)
- Latest meeting: 2 April 2021 (Ross County 1–3 Inverness Caledonian Thistle)
- Stadiums: Caledonian Stadium, Inverness and Victoria Park, Dingwall

Statistics
- Most wins: Inverness Caledonian Thistle (27)
- Top scorer: (Northern Ireland) Liam Boyce, Ross County, 10 goals
- Largest victory: Inverness Caledonian Thistle 1–5 Ross County, 25 February 2003
- Smallest victory: 1–0, (7 times). Inverness Caledonian Thistle x5 Ross County x2
- Largest goal scoring: 6 goals, (4 times). 3–3 draw x3 Inverness Caledonian Thistle 1–5 Ross County
- Longest win streak: Inverness Caledonian Thistle, 4 games. (16 November 1996 - 12 February 1997)
- Longest unbeaten streak: Ross County, 10 games. (13 August 2016 - 2 April 2021)
- Current win streak: Inverness Caledonian Thistle, 1 game. (2 April 2021 – present)
- Current unbeaten streak: Inverness Caledonian Thistle, 1 game. (2 April 2021 – present)
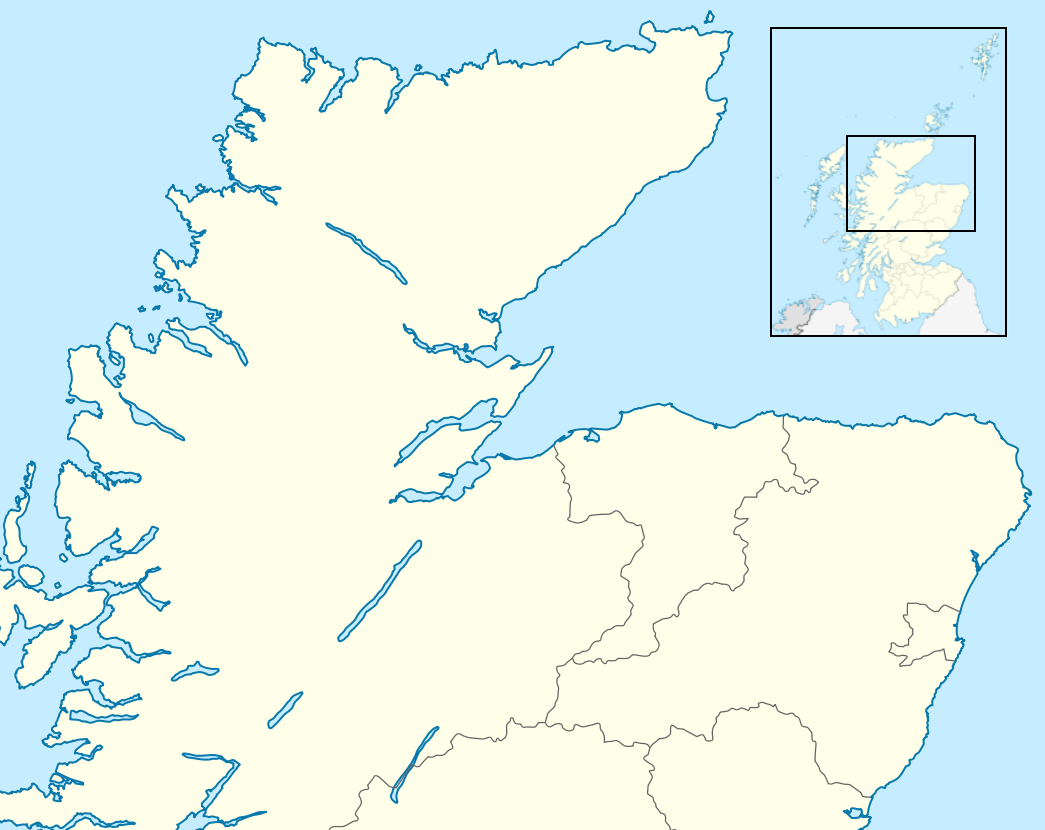

Inverness CT	Ross County

The Highland derby is a football rivalry that is based in the Scottish Highlands. It is contested between the only two full-time SPFL clubs in the Highland council area, Inverness Caledonian Thistle and Ross County. The city of Inverness and town of Dingwall are only 14 miles (23 km) apart, whereas the nearest other professional clubs (Aberdeen, Dundee, Dundee United and St Johnstone) are over 100 miles (160 km) away from either club. The fixture is the most northerly professional football derby in the UK.

== History ==
The rivalry first arose in 1994, when Caledonian Thistle (whose name did not yet include the city) were formed out of the merger between Caledonian and Inverness Thistle. Both the new Inverness club and Ross County had been accepted as new teams into the Scottish Football League, starting a trend of Highland League clubs entering the SFL. The first match between the sides was a Third Division contest, played on 27 August 1994 at Victoria Park, won 3–1 by Inverness.

Since that historic first match, the encounter has gone from strength to strength as both teams improved and came to compete near the top of the Scottish football league system. Both have significant fanbases that have grown due to their successes since their inclusion in 1994. Attendances at the derby matches often surpass the 5,000 mark, making the match itself a popular attraction. The clubs met in the top flight of Scottish football for the first time during the 2012–13 Scottish Premier League season. For a few months in 2016, the Highland clubs were simultaneously the holders of the country's two major cups, with Inverness's triumph in the 2015 Scottish Cup Final followed by Ross County's win in the 2016 Scottish League Cup Final (March).

The increased level of media interest in the fixture led some outlets to humorously tag the derby as "El Kessocko" (a pun on Spanish El Clásico) or "The Cold Firm" (a pun on the Old Firm).

The relationship between the clubs is unusual in that there is "a level of goodwill" between them. For example, both clubs closely co-operate in the Highland Football Academy.

=== Head-to-head ===
In head-to-head matches, the teams have played each other in 62 games, with Inverness Caledonian Thistle winning 27 times, compared to Ross County's 17. A total of 18 matches have ended in a draw. Inverness have won more league, Scottish Cup and Challenge Cup matches, with the teams tied in League Cup matches.

As of 2 April 2021

Team	League	Scottish Cup	League Cup	Challenge Cup	Total
Inverness Caledonian Thistle	22	2	1	2	27
Ross County	16	0	1	0	17
Draw	15	3	0	0	18

== Matches played ==
League

		Inverness Caledonian Thistle v Ross County				Ross County v Inverness Caledonian Thistle			
Season	Division	Date	Venue	Score	Attendance	Date	Venue	Score	Attendance
1994–95	Third Division	29 Oct 1994	Telford Street Park	0 – 0	2,440	27 Aug 1994	Victoria Park	1 – 3	3,157
1994–95	Third Division	6 May 1995	Telford Street Park	3 – 0	3,562	2 Jan 1995	Victoria Park	3 – 1	2,749
1995–96	Third Division	30 Sep 1995	Telford Street Park	1 – 1	3,625	18 Nov 1995	Victoria Park	2 – 0	4,288
1995–96	Third Division	23 Jan 1996	Telford Street Park	1 – 1	4,931	16 Mar 1996	Victoria Park	2 – 1	3,670
1996–97	Third Division	16 Nov 1996	Caledonian Stadium	2 – 0	4,562	28 Sep 1996	Victoria Park	1 – 3	3,598
1996–97	Third Division	15 Mar 1997	Caledonian Stadium	3 – 0	5,525	12 Feb 1997	Victoria Park	0 – 3	5,017
2000–01	First Division	16 Sep 2000	Caledonian Stadium	0 – 1	4,823	18 Nov 2000	Victoria Park	0 – 3	5,721
2000–01	First Division	2 Jan 2001	Caledonian Stadium	3 – 3	5,291	31 Mar 2001	Victoria Park	0 – 1	5,876
2001–02	First Division	17 Nov 2001	Caledonian Stadium	3 – 0	4,513	15 Sep 2001	Victoria Park	2 – 1	4,679
2001–02	First Division	23 Mar 2002	Caledonian Stadium	1 – 1	4,685	19 Mar 2002	Victoria Park	0 – 0	4,414
2002–03	First Division	24 Aug 2002	Caledonian Stadium	2 – 0	3,669	9 Nov 2002	Victoria Park	0 – 2	5,449
2002–03	First Division	25 Feb 2003	Caledonian Stadium	1 – 5	3,443	8 Mar 2003	Victoria Park	0 – 2	4,621
2003–04	First Division	14 Nov 2003	Caledonian Stadium	3 – 3	3,523	30 Aug 2003	Victoria Park	1 – 1	5,020
2003–04	First Division	27 Mar 2004	Caledonian Stadium	1 – 0	4,019	3 Jan 2004	Victoria Park	1 – 0	6,120
2009–10	First Division	29 Aug 2009	Caledonian Stadium	1 – 3	5,846	7 Nov 2009	Victoria Park	2 – 1	5,506
2009–10	First Division	30 Mar 2010	Caledonian Stadium	3 – 0	5,411	20 Mar 2010	Victoria Park	0 – 0	5,928
2012–13	Premier League	5 Oct 2012	Caledonian Stadium	3 – 1	6,766	2 Mar 2013	Victoria Park	0 – 0	5,959
2012–13	Premier League	16 Mar 2013	Caledonian Stadium	2 – 1	5,750	19 May 2013	Victoria Park	1 – 0	6,002
2013–14	Premiership	1 Jan 2014	Caledonian Stadium	1 – 2	4,332	25 Feb 2014	Victoria Park	0 – 3	4,805
2013–14	Premiership					4 Apr 2014	Victoria Park	1 – 2	4,433
2014–15	Premiership	5 Oct 2014	Caledonian Stadium	1 – 1	3,741	1 Jan 2015	Victoria Park	1 – 3	4,887
2014–15	Premiership	31 Jan 2015	Caledonian Stadium	1 – 1	4,021				
2015–16	Premiership	2 Jan 2016	Caledonian Stadium	2 – 0	5,388	3 Oct 2015	Victoria Park	1 – 2	5,473
2015–16	Premiership					19 Mar 2016	Victoria Park	0 – 3	5,912
2016–17	Premiership	13 Aug 2016	Caledonian Stadium	2 – 3	4,204	31 Dec 2016	Victoria Park	3 – 2	5,111
2016–17	Premiership	18 Mar 2017	Caledonian Stadium	1 – 1	4,123	28 Apr 2017	Victoria Park	4 – 0	4,928
2018–19	Championship	3 Nov 2018	Caledonian Stadium	2 – 2	4,353	22 Sep 2018	Victoria Park	0 – 0	6,402
2018–19	Championship	2 Apr 2019	Caledonian Stadium	1 – 2	3,795	29 Dec 2018	Victoria Park	2 – 1	6,313

=== Cups ===
Season	Division	Round	Date	Venue	Score	Attendance
2003–04	Challenge Cup	Quarter-final	26 Aug 2003	Caledonian Stadium	1 – 0	2,631
2004–05	League Cup	Second round	24 Aug 2004	Victoria Park	0 – 1	3,315
2009–10	Challenge Cup	Semi-final	4 Oct 2009	Caledonian Stadium	1 – 0	2,755
2012–13	Scottish Cup	Fourth round	1 Dec 2012	Victoria Park	3 – 3	5,077
2012–13	Scottish Cup	Fourth round replay	11 Dec 2012	Caledonian Stadium	2 – 1	4,135
2015–16	League Cup	Quarter-final	27 Oct 2015	Caledonian Stadium	1 – 2	3,004
2018–19	Scottish Cup	Fifth round	11 Feb 2019	Victoria Park	2 – 2	2,600
2018–19	Scottish Cup	Fifth round replay	19 Feb 2019	Caledonian Stadium	2 – 2 (Note: After Extra Time; Inverness CT won 5–4 on penalties.)	3,608
2020–21	Scottish Cup	Third Round	2 April 2021	Victoria Park	1 – 3	0 (Note: Game was held behind closed doors due to COVID Pandemic.)

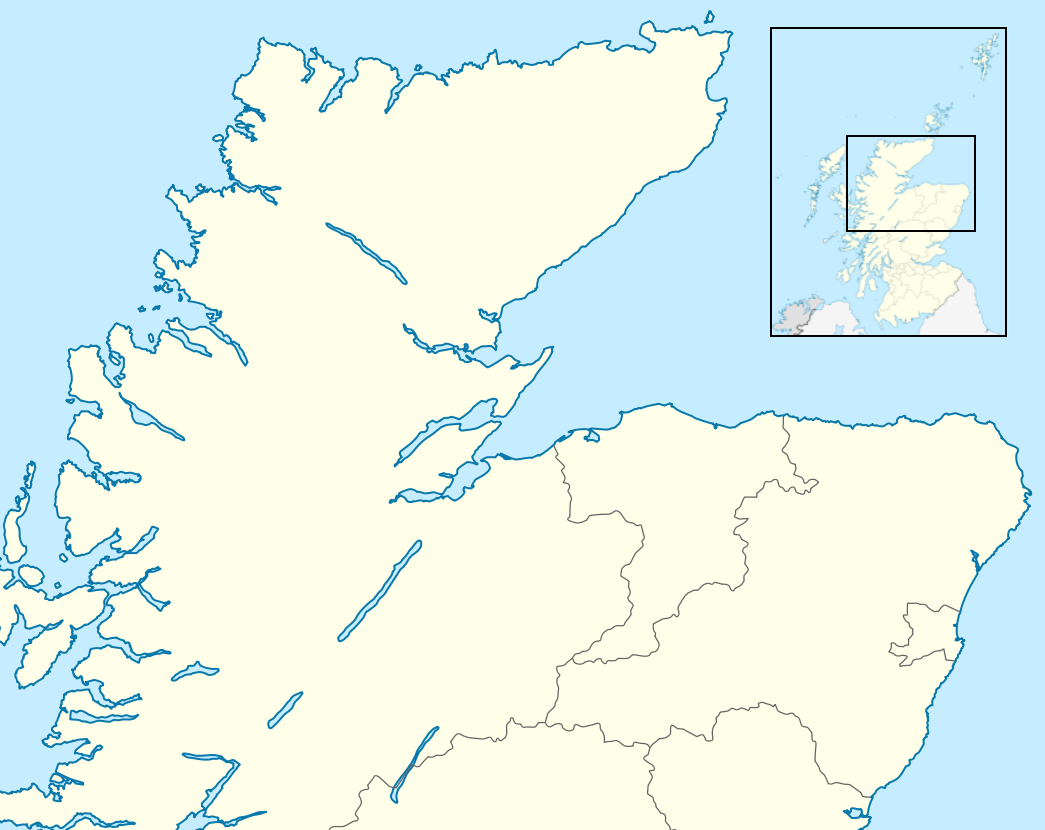
Locations of the two competing teams

== Goalscorer records ==
Players with 3 or more goals in the Highland derby.

As of 2 April 2021

Scorer	Team(s)	League	Scottish Cup	League Cup	Challenge Cup	Total
(Northern Ireland) Liam Boyce	Ross County	10	—	—	—	10
(Scotland) Dennis Wyness	Inverness Caledonian Thistle	9	—	—	—	9
(Northern Ireland) Billy McKay	Inverness Caledonian Thistle	4	3	—	—	9
(Northern Ireland) Billy McKay	Ross County	1	1	—	—	9
(Scotland) Iain Stewart	Inverness Caledonian Thistle	7	—	—	—	7
(Republic of Ireland) Aaron Doran	Inverness Caledonian Thistle	5	1	—	—	6
(Scotland) Alan Hercher	Inverness Caledonian Thistle	4	—	—	—	4
(Scotland) Jamie McPherson	Ross County	4	—	—	—	4
(Scotland) Iain Vigurs	Ross County	2	2	—	—	4
(England) Ross Draper	Inverness Caledonian Thistle	3	—	—	—	3
(Scotland) Steven Ferguson	Ross County	3	—	—	—	3
(Scotland) Brian Grant	Ross County	3	—	—	—	3
(Scotland) Barry Robson	Inverness Caledonian Thistle	3	—	—	—	3
(England) Miles Storey	Inverness Caledonian Thistle	3	—	—	—	3
(England) Marley Watkins	Inverness Caledonian Thistle	3	—	—	—	3
(Scotland) Barry Wilson	Inverness Caledonian Thistle	3	—	—	—	3
(England) Greg Tansey	Inverness Caledonian Thistle	2	—	1	—	3
(Scotland) Steve Hislop	Inverness Caledonian Thistle	1	—	—	1	3
(Scotland) Steve Hislop	Ross County	1	—	—	—	3
(Republic of Ireland) Richie Foran	Inverness Caledonian Thistle	1	2	—	—	3
(Scotland) Ross Stewart	Ross County	1	2	—	—	3
(Scotland) Jordan White	Inverness Caledonian Thistle	1	2	—	—	3
(Scotland) Michael Gardyne	Ross County	1	1	1	—	3

== Managerial records ==
As of 2 April 2021. Minimum 5 Highland Derby games as manager.

Name	Team	Years	Overall Record			League Record		
Name	Team	Years	Games	Wins	Win %	Games	Wins	Win %
John Hughes (Scotland)	Inverness Caledonian Thistle	2013–2016	10	6	60.00%	9	6	66.66%
John Hughes (Scotland)	Ross County	2020–2021	1	0	0.00%	0	0	0.00%
Steve Paterson (Scotland)	Inverness Caledonian Thistle	1995–2002	18	9	50.00%	18	9	50.00%
Terry Butcher (England)	Inverness Caledonian Thistle	2009–2013	11	5	45.45%	8	3	37.50%
Robert Wilson (Scotland)	Ross County	1987–1996	8	3	37.50%	8	3	37.50%
Jim McIntyre (Scotland)	Ross County	2014–2017	11	4	36.36%	10	3	30.00%
Stuart Kettlewell (Scotland) and Steven Ferguson (Scotland)	Ross County	2018–2020	6	2	33.33%	4	2	50%
Derek Adams (Scotland)	Ross County	2007–2010, 2011–2014	14	4	28.57%	11	4	43%
John Robertson (Scotland)	Inverness Caledonian Thistle	2002–2004, 2017–2021	14	4	28.57%	10	2	20.00%
Alex Smith (Scotland)	Ross County	2002–2005	8	2	25.00%	6	2	33.33%
Neale Cooper (Scotland)	Ross County	1996–2002	14	2	14.28%	14	2	14.28%

== Notable players and managers of both clubs ==
A number of players have played for both clubs. Craig Brewster is a former player and manager of ICT who then played for and coached Ross County. John Robertson and John Hughes have had spells as manager at both clubs.

Among the players who have featured for both sides are:

- Andrew Barrowman
- Graham Bayne
- Mark Brown
- Joe Chalmers
- Alex Cooper
- Don Cowie
- Lionel Djebi-Zadi
- Coll Donaldson
- Ross Draper
- Russell Duncan
- Michael Fraser
- Les Fridge
- Stuart Golabek
- Richie Hart
- Richard Hastings
- Jay Henderson
- Steven Hislop
- Adam Mackinnon
- Roy McBain
- Mark McCulloch
- Billy McKay
- Gary McSwegan
- Alan Morgan
- Grant Munro
- John Rankin
- Antonio Reguero
- Mark Ridgers
- Hugh Robertson
- Alex Samuel
- Greg Tansey
- Ross Tokely
- Lewis Toshney
- Carl Tremarco
- Iain Vigurs
- Nicky Walker
- Steven Watt
- Jordan White
- Barry Wilson
- Garry Wood

== Clubs' honours ==
These are the football honours of Inverness Caledonian Thistle and Ross County since they joined the Scottish League in 1994–95:

National Titles	Inverness Caledonian Thistle	Ross County
First Division/Championship	2 (2/0)	2 (1/1)
Second Division/League One	1 (0/1)	1 (1/0)
Third Division	1	1
Scottish Cup	1	—
Scottish League Cup	—	1
Scottish Challenge Cup	3	3
Total	8	8

These are the football honours of Caledonian, Inverness Thistle and Ross County until they joined the Scottish League in 1994–95:

National Competition	Caledonian	Inverness Thistle	Ross County
Highland Football League	18	8	3
Highland League Cup	5	3	4
North of Scotland Cup	20	13	4
Total	43	24	11
