= 2020–21 Scottish Premiership =

115th season of top-tier football league in Scotland

Scottish Premiership
- Season: 2020–21
- Dates: 1 August 2020 – 16 May 2021
- Champions: Rangers; 1st Premiership title 55th Scottish title
- Relegated: Kilmarnock; Hamilton Academical
- Champions League: Rangers; Celtic
- Europa League: St Johnstone
- Europa Conference League: Hibernian; Aberdeen
- Matches: 228
- Goals: 552 (2.42 per match)
- Top goalscorer: Odsonne Édouard (18 goals)
- Biggest home win: Rangers 8–0 Hamilton Academical (8 November 2020)
- Biggest away win: Ross County 0–5 Celtic (12 September 2020)
- Highest scoring: Hamilton Academical 3–5 St Johnstone (17 October 2020); Rangers 8–0 Hamilton Academical (8 November 2020)
- Longest winning run: 15 matches: Rangers
- Longest unbeaten run: 38 matches: Rangers
- Longest winless run: 12 matches: Motherwell; Ross County
- Longest losing run: 8 matches: Kilmarnock

The 2020–21 Scottish Premiership was the eighth season of the Scottish Premiership, the 124th edition of the highest division of Scottish football. The fixtures were published on 6 July 2020, with the season beginning on 1 August, following Scottish Government approval due to the COVID-19 pandemic in Scotland.

Twelve teams contested the league: Aberdeen, Celtic, Dundee United, Hamilton Academical, Hibernian, Kilmarnock, Livingston, Motherwell, Rangers, Ross County, St Johnstone and St Mirren. Celtic were the defending champions, seeking a record-breaking tenth successive title.

On 7 March, Rangers clinched their 55th title, their first since 2011, and their first since the club went into liquidation in 2012. The title was the earliest title clinching time after Celtic drew 0–0 away to Dundee United with six games remaining. Rangers also completed an unbeaten league season on 15 May 2021 after a 4–0 win against Aberdeen on the final matchday.

== Teams ==
The following teams changed division after the 2019–20 season.

Promoted from the Championship

- Dundee United

Relegated to the Championship

- Heart of Midlothian

=== Stadia and locations ===
Aberdeen	Celtic	Dundee United	Hamilton Academical
Pittodrie Stadium	Celtic Park	Tannadice Park	New Douglas Park
Capacity: 20,866	Capacity: 60,411	Capacity: 14,223	Capacity: 6,018
Hibernian	Location of teams in the 2020–21 Scottish Premiership		Kilmarnock
Easter Road	Location of teams in the 2020–21 Scottish Premiership		Rugby Park
Capacity: 20,421	Location of teams in the 2020–21 Scottish Premiership		Capacity: 17,889
Livingston	Location of teams in the 2020–21 Scottish Premiership		Motherwell
Almondvale Stadium	Location of teams in the 2020–21 Scottish Premiership		Fir Park
Capacity: 9,512	Location of teams in the 2020–21 Scottish Premiership		Capacity: 13,677
Rangers	Ross County	St Johnstone	St Mirren
Ibrox Stadium	Victoria Park	McDiarmid Park	St Mirren Park
Capacity: 50,817	Capacity: 6,541	Capacity: 10,696	Capacity: 7,937

=== Personnel and kits ===
Team	Manager	Captain	Kit manufacturer	Shirt sponsor
Aberdeen	(Scotland) Stephen Glass	(England) Joe Lewis	Adidas	Saltire Energy
Celtic	(Scotland) John Kennedy (Interim)	(Scotland) Scott Brown	Adidas	Dafabet
Dundee United	(Scotland) Micky Mellon	(Scotland) Mark Reynolds	Macron	Utilita
Hamilton Academical	(Scotland) Brian Rice	(Scotland) Brian Easton	Adidas	Cullen
Hibernian	(Scotland) Jack Ross	(Scotland) David Gray	Macron	"Thank You NHS"
Kilmarnock	(Northern Ireland) Tommy Wright	(Republic of Ireland) Gary Dicker	Hummel	Brownings The Bakers
Livingston	(Scotland) David Martindale	(England) Marvin Bartley	Nike	Phoenix Drilling Ltd
Motherwell	(Scotland) Graham Alexander	(Scotland) Declan Gallagher	Macron	Paycare
Rangers	(England) Steven Gerrard	(England) James Tavernier	Castore	32Red
Ross County	(Scotland) John Hughes	(Scotland) Iain Vigurs	Macron	Ross-shire Engineering
St Johnstone	(Scotland) Callum Davidson	(Scotland) Jason Kerr	Macron	Binn Group
St Mirren	(Republic of Ireland) Jim Goodwin	(Republic of Ireland) Joe Shaughnessy	Joma	Skyview Capital

=== Managerial changes ===
Team	Outgoing manager	Manner of departure	Date of vacancy	Position in table	Incoming manager	Date of appointment
Ross County	(Scotland) Steven Ferguson (co-manager)	Internal restructuring	10 June 2020	Pre-season	(Scotland) Stuart Kettlewell (manager)	10 June 2020
St Johnstone	(Scotland) Alec Cleland	End of caretaker spell	18 June 2020	Pre-season	(Scotland) Callum Davidson	18 June 2020
Dundee United	(Scotland) Robbie Neilson	Signed by Heart of Midlothian	21 June 2020	Pre-season	(Scotland) Micky Mellon	6 July 2020
Livingston	(Scotland) Gary Holt	Resigned	26 November 2020	10th	(Scotland) David Martindale	21 December 2020
Ross County	(Scotland) Stuart Kettlewell	Sacked	19 December 2020	12th	(Scotland) John Hughes	21 December 2020
Motherwell	(Northern Ireland) Stephen Robinson	Resigned	31 December 2020	10th	(Scotland) Graham Alexander	7 January 2021
Kilmarnock	(England) Alex Dyer	Mutual consent	30 January 2021	9th	(Northern Ireland) Tommy Wright	8 February 2021
Celtic	(Northern Ireland) Neil Lennon	Sacked	24 February 2021	2nd	(Scotland) John Kennedy (Interim)	24 February 2021
Aberdeen	(Scotland) Derek McInnes	Mutual consent	8 March 2021	4th	(Scotland) Stephen Glass	23 March 2021

== Format ==
In the initial phase of the season, the 12 teams play a round-robin tournament whereby each team plays each one of the other teams three times. After 33 games, the league splits into two sections of six teams, with each team playing each other in that section. The league attempts to balance the fixture list so that teams in the same section play each other twice at home and twice away, but sometimes this is impossible. A total of 228 matches were played, with 38 matches played by each team.

== League summary ==
=== Effects of the COVID-19 pandemic ===
After the 12 Premiership clubs were given permission to restart full-contact training by the Scottish Government from 29 June 2020, it was announced that an Aberdeen player had tested positive for COVID-19 two days later. The identity of the player was not disclosed but the club said that he was asymptomatic and self-isolating.

Nine days prior to the start of the season on 1 August, it was reported on 23 July that seven members of St Mirren's coaching staff had tested positive. As a result, a pre-season friendly between St Mirren and St Johnstone on 25 July was cancelled and Hamilton Academical, who had played St Mirren in a friendly on 18 July, confirmed that all of their players and coaching staff had subsequently tested negative. The following day, St Mirren announced that after the seven positive tests were retested, only one came back as positive with the other six negative.

On the opening day of the season Rangers defeated Aberdeen 1–0 at Pittodrie Stadium and after the game, eight members of the Aberdeen squad went out to a pub in the city. Later in the week, the pub was linked to an outbreak of COVID-19 in Aberdeen which led to a lockdown of the city. Two of the group subsequently tested positive for COVID-19 and the eight players were put into self-isolation. Initially, the Scottish Government said Aberdeen's match against St Johnstone, scheduled for 8 August, wouldn't be affected by the lockdown of the city but the match was postponed after First Minister Nicola Sturgeon said she was "pretty furious" about the situation. Aberdeen manager Derek McInnes was critical of the group of players - namely Bruce Anderson, Craig Bryson, Sam Cosgrove, Michael Devlin, Jonny Hayes, Matty Kennedy, Dylan McGeouch and Scott McKenna - who apologised for a "huge error of judgement".

The following weekend, defending champions Celtic drew 1–1 with Kilmarnock at Rugby Park on 9 August. Defender Boli Bolingoli was in the Celtic match squad and came off the bench during the match, but was found to have travelled back from Spain a few days earlier – at that time, a 14-day quarantine was required for anyone travelling to Scotland from that country. Celtic manager Neil Lennon said Bolingoli "went rogue" and the club were unaware of his actions before it came to light on 10 August. Kilmarnock manager Alex Dyer revealed that Celtic had apologised for the situation. Bolingoli (who tested negative for the virus) was subsequently fined £480 by the police for his breach of quarantine rules.

First Minister Nicola Sturgeon warned Scottish football clubs, players and authorities that the breaches of COVID-19 protocols set up to allow football to resume in Scotland had resulted in her giving the game a "yellow card" and that further breaches could lead to a pause in the football season. Aberdeen and Celtic's matches against Hamilton Academical and St Mirren respectively on 12 August were postponed as a result of the two incidents, as well as the Celtic vs. Aberdeen match on 15 August.

The Scottish Football Association (SFA) and Scottish Professional Football League (SPFL) introduced new rules following the breaches of COVID-19 rules which meant Bolingoli and the "Aberdeen eight" were charged by both governing bodies. An SFA hearing was held on 28 August which resulted in a three-match ban with a further two-match ban suspended for Bolingoli. The "Aberdeen eight" were each given a three-match suspended ban. The suspended bans would be triggered if a player was again charged with "bringing the game into disrepute" before 28 February 2021.

Three fixtures (Kilmarnock v Motherwell, St Mirren v Motherwell and St Mirren v Hamilton) during the autumn were postponed after Kilmarnock and St Mirren told the SPFL that they could not fulfil them as scheduled due to COVID-19 outbreaks. The SPFL initially awarded 3–0 victories to their opponents; but that decision was overturned after an appeal to the Scottish Football Association.

=== League table ===
Pos	Team	Pld	W	D	L	GF	GA	GD	Pts	Qualification or relegation (Note: Teams play each other three times (33 matches), before the league is split into two groups (the top six and the bottom six).)
1	Rangers (C)	38	32	6	0	92	13	+79	102	Qualification for the Champions League third qualifying round
2	Celtic	38	22	11	5	78	29	+49	77	Qualification for the Champions League second qualifying round
3	Hibernian	38	18	9	11	48	35	+13	63	Qualification for the Europa Conference League second qualifying round
4	Aberdeen	38	15	11	12	36	38	−2	56	Qualification for the Europa Conference League second qualifying round
5	St Johnstone	38	11	12	15	36	46	−10	45	Qualification for the Europa League third qualifying round (Note: St Johnstone qualified as the 2020–21 Scottish Cup winners.)
6	Livingston	38	12	9	17	42	54	−12	45	
7	St Mirren	38	11	12	15	37	45	−8	45	
8	Motherwell	38	12	9	17	39	55	−16	45	
9	Dundee United	38	10	14	14	32	50	−18	44	
10	Ross County	38	11	6	21	35	66	−31	39	
11	Kilmarnock (R)	38	10	6	22	43	54	−11	36	Qualification for the Premiership play-off final
12	Hamilton Academical (R)	38	7	9	22	34	67	−33	30	Relegation to Championship

Rules for classification: 1) Points; 2) Goal difference; 3) Goals scored; 4) Head-to-head points; 5) Head-to-Head goal difference; 6) Play-off (only if deciding champion, UEFA competitions qualification, second stage group allocation or relegation).
(C) Champions; (R) Relegated

=== Positions by round ===
The table lists the positions of teams after each week of matches. To preserve chronological evolvements, any postponed matches are not included in the round at which they were originally scheduled, but added to the full round they were played immediately afterwards. For example, if a match is scheduled for round 13, but then postponed and played between rounds 16 and 17, it is added to the standings for round 16.

Team ╲ Round	1	2	3	4	5	6	7	8	9	10	11	12	13	14	15	16	17	18	19	20	21	22	23	24	25	26	27	28	29	30	31	32	33	34	35	36	37	38
Rangers	3	2	1	1	1	1	1	1	1	1	1	1	1	1	1	1	1	1	1	1	1	1	1	1	1	1	1	1	1	1	1	1	1	1	1	1	1	1
Celtic	1	4	4	6	4	3	2	2	2	2	2	2	2	2	2	2	2	2	2	2	2	2	2	2	2	2	2	2	2	2	2	2	2	2	2	2	2	2
Hibernian	2	1	2	2	2	2	3	3	3	3	4	3	3	4	4	3	3	4	3	4	4	4	4	3	4	4	3	3	3	3	3	3	3	3	3	3	3	3
Aberdeen	9	9	11	11	7	4	4	4	4	4	3	4	4	3	3	4	4	3	4	3	3	3	3	4	3	3	4	4	4	4	4	4	4	4	4	4	4	4
St Johnstone	7	7	9	7	8	7	6	9	11	12	9	10	9	7	8	8	9	10	10	10	9	9	9	9	9	8	8	8	8	8	8	7	6	6	6	5	5	5
Livingston	10	11	10	10	12	10	11	12	8	6	8	9	10	10	10	9	7	7	7	6	6	5	5	5	5	5	5	5	5	5	5	5	5	5	5	6	6	6
St Mirren	5	6	6	5	6	6	7	10	12	11	11	11	11	11	11	12	10	8	8	7	7	7	8	8	8	6	6	6	6	6	6	6	7	8	7	8	8	7
Motherwell	11	10	8	9	10	12	12	8	9	9	10	8	7	8	5	5	5	5	6	9	10	11	10	11	11	10	9	9	9	9	9	9	9	9	9	7	7	8
Dundee United	6	5	5	4	5	8	8	6	6	7	6	6	5	5	6	6	6	6	5	5	5	6	6	6	6	7	7	7	7	7	7	8	8	7	8	9	9	9
Ross County	4	3	3	3	3	5	5	5	7	8	7	7	8	9	9	11	12	12	12	12	11	12	12	10	10	11	11	11	12	10	10	10	10	10	11	10	10	10
Kilmarnock	8	8	7	8	11	9	10	7	5	5	5	5	6	6	7	7	8	9	9	8	8	8	7	7	7	9	10	10	10	11	11	12	11	11	10	11	11	11
Hamilton Academical	12	12	12	12	9	11	9	11	10	10	12	12	12	12	12	10	11	11	11	11	12	10	11	12	12	12	12	12	11	12	12	11	12	12	12	12	12	12

Leader and Champions League third qualifying round
Champions league second qualifying round
Europa Conference League second qualifying round
Qualification for the Premiership play-off final
Relegated to the Championship

== Results ==
=== Matches 1–22 ===
Teams play each other twice, once at home and once away.

Home \ Away	ABE	CEL	DUN	HAM	HIB	KIL	LIV	MOT	RAN	ROS	STJ	STM
Aberdeen	—	3–3	0–0	4–2	2–0	1–0	2–1	0–3	0–1	2–0	2–1	2–1
Celtic	1–0	—	3–0	5–1	3–0	2–0	3–2	3–0	0–2	2–0	1–1	1–2
Dundee United	0–0	0–1	—	2–1	0–1	2–0	1–2	1–1	1–2	2–1	1–1	2–1
Hamilton Academical	1–1	0–3	1–1	—	0–4	1–0	0–2	3–0	0–2	0–1	3–5	0–1
Hibernian	0–1	2–2	1–1	3–2	—	2–1	0–3	0–0	2–2	0–2	2–2	1–0
Kilmarnock	0–2	1–1	4–0	2–1	0–1	—	1–2	0–1	0–1	3–1	1–2	1–1
Livingston	0–0	2–2	2–0	1–2	1–4	1–3	—	0–2	0–0	1–0	2–0	0–1
Motherwell	0–0	1–4	0–1	0–1	0–3	0–2	2–2	—	1–5	4–0	1–0	0–1
Rangers	4–0	1–0	4–0	8–0	1–0	2–0	2–0	3–1	—	2–0	3–0	3–0
Ross County	0–3	0–5	1–2	0–2	0–0	2–2	1–1	1–0	0–4	—	1–1	0–2
St Johnstone	0–1	0–2	0–0	0–0	0–1	1–0	1–2	1–1	0–3	0–1	—	1–0
St Mirren	1–1	1–2	0–0	1–1	0–3	0–1	1–0	0–0	0–2	1–1	3–2	—

Legend: Blue = home team win; Yellow = draw; Red = away team win.
For upcoming matches, an "a" indicates there is an article about the rivalry between the two participants.

=== Matches 23–33 ===
Teams play each other once, either home or away.

Home \ Away	ABE	CEL	DUN	HAM	HIB	KIL	LIV	MOT	RAN	ROS	STJ	STM
Aberdeen	—	—	—	0–0	—	1–0	0–2	2–0	1–2	—	—	0–0
Celtic	1–0	—	—	2–0	1–1	—	0–0	2–1	1–1	—	—	—
Dundee United	1–0	0–0	—	—	0–2	—	3–0	—	—	—	2–2	1–5
Hamilton Academical	—	—	0–0	—	—	—	—	—	1–1	1–2	1–1	1–1
Hibernian	2–0	—	—	2–0	—	2–0	—	0–2	0–1	—	—	—
Kilmarnock	—	0–4	1–1	2–0	—	—	—	4–1	—	—	2–3	—
Livingston	—	—	—	2–1	1–1	2–0	—	—	0–1	3–1	1–2	—
Motherwell	—	—	2–1	1–4	—	—	3–1	—	1–1	—	0–3	—
Rangers	—	—	4–1	—	—	1–0	—	—	—	5–0	1–0	3–0
Ross County	4–1	1–0	0–2	—	1–2	3–2	—	1–2	—	—	—	—
St Johnstone	0–0	1–2	—	—	1–0	—	—	—	—	1–0	—	1–0
St Mirren	—	0–4	—	—	1–2	2–0	1–1	1–1	—	1–0	—	—

Legend: Blue = home team win; Yellow = draw; Red = away team win.
For upcoming matches, an "a" indicates there is an article about the rivalry between the two participants.

=== Matches 34–38 ===
After 33 matches, the league splits into two sections of six teams i.e. the top six and the bottom six, with the teams playing every other team in their section once (either at home or away). The exact matches are determined by the position of the teams in the league table at the time of the split.

==== Top six ====
Home \ Away	ABE	CEL	HIB	LIV	RAN	STJ
Aberdeen	—	1–1	0–1	—	—	—
Celtic	—	—	—	6–0	—	4–0
Hibernian	—	0–0	—	2–1	—	0–1
Livingston	1–2	—	—	—	0–3	—
Rangers	4–0	4–1	2–1	—	—	—
St Johnstone	0–1	—	—	0–0	1–1	—

Legend: Blue = home team win; Yellow = draw; Red = away team win.
For upcoming matches, an "a" indicates there is an article about the rivalry between the two participants.

==== Bottom six ====
Home \ Away	DUN	HAM	KIL	MOT	ROS	STM
Dundee United	—	—	—	2–2	0–2	—
Hamilton Academical	0–1	—	0–2	0–1	—	—
Kilmarnock	3–0	—	—	—	2–2	3–3
Motherwell	—	—	2–0	—	1–2	1–0
Ross County	—	2–1	—	—	—	1–3
St Mirren	0–0	1–2	—	—	—	—

Legend: Blue = home team win; Yellow = draw; Red = away team win.
For upcoming matches, an "a" indicates there is an article about the rivalry between the two participants.

== Season statistics ==
=== Scoring ===
==== Top scorers ====
As of 16 May 2021

Rank	Player	Club	Goals
1	(France) Odsonne Édouard	Celtic	18
2	(Scotland) Kevin Nisbet	Hibernian	14
2	(Jamaica) Kemar Roofe	Rangers	14
4	(Australia) Martin Boyle	Hibernian	12
4	(Colombia) Alfredo Morelos	Rangers	12
4	(England) James Tavernier	Rangers	12
7	(England) Devante Cole	Motherwell	11
8	(Norway) Mohamed Elyounoussi	Celtic	10
8	(England) Ryan Kent	Rangers	10
8	(Republic of Ireland) Jamie McGrath	St Mirren	10

==== Hat-tricks ====
Player	For	Against	Score	Date	Ref.
(France) Odsonne Édouard	Celtic	Hamilton Academical	5–1 (H)	2 August 2020	
(Scotland) Kevin Nisbet	Hibernian	Livingston	4–1 (A)	8 August 2020	
(Norway) Mohamed Elyounoussi	Celtic	Motherwell	4–1 (A)	8 November 2020	
(Northern Ireland) Kyle Lafferty	Kilmarnock	Dundee United	3–0 (H)	21 April 2021	

==== Clean sheets ====
As of 16 May 2021

Rank	Player	Club	Clean Sheets
1	(England) Joe Lewis	Aberdeen	17
1	(Scotland) Allan McGregor	Rangers	17
3	(Switzerland) Benjamin Siegrist	Dundee United	12
3	(Israel) Ofir Marciano	Hibernian	12
5	(England) Jak Alnwick	St Mirren	10

=== Attendances ===
Games are mostly being played behind closed doors due to the COVID-19 pandemic. Limited attendance is allowed at some grounds with strict conditions under the Scottish Government Tier system, dependent on the club's geographical location.

== Awards ==
Month	Manager of the Month		Player of the Month		Ref.
Month	Manager	Club	Player	Club	Ref.
August	(England) Steven Gerrard	Rangers	(England) Ryan Kent	Rangers	
September	(Northern Ireland) Neil Lennon	Celtic	(England) James Tavernier	Rangers	
October	(England) Steven Gerrard	Rangers	(England) Connor Goldson	Rangers	
November	(England) Steven Gerrard	Rangers	(England) James Tavernier	Rangers	
December	(Scotland) David Martindale	Livingston	(Scotland) David Turnbull	Celtic	
January	(Scotland) David Martindale	Livingston	(Scotland) Scott Robinson	Livingston	
February	(England) Steven Gerrard	Rangers	(France) Odsonne Édouard	Celtic	
March	(Scotland) Callum Davidson	St Johnstone	(Colombia) Alfredo Morelos	Rangers	
April	(Scotland) Graham Alexander	Motherwell	(Northern Ireland) Kyle Lafferty	Kilmarnock	

=== Annual awards ===
Award	Winner	Club
Scottish Premiership Player of the Year	(Scotland) Allan McGregor	Rangers
PFA Scotland Premiership Player of the Year	(England) James Tavernier	Rangers
PFA Scotland SPFL Young Player of the Year	(Scotland) David Turnbull	Celtic
PFA Scotland SPFL Manager of the Year	(England) Steven Gerrard	Rangers
SFWA Player of the Year	(Northern Ireland) Steven Davis	Rangers

PFA Scotland Team of the Year
Goalkeeper	(Scotland) Allan McGregor (Rangers)			
Defenders	(England) James Tavernier (Rangers)	(Denmark) Kristoffer Ajer (Celtic)	(England) Connor Goldson (Rangers)	(Croatia) Borna Barišić (Rangers)
Midfielders	(Finland) Glen Kamara (Rangers)		(Scotland) David Turnbull (Celtic)	(Northern Ireland) Steven Davis (Rangers)
Forwards	(France) Odsonne Édouard (Celtic)		(Colombia) Alfredo Morelos (Rangers)	(England) Ryan Kent (Rangers)

== Premiership play-offs ==
The quarter-finals were contested between the third and fourth placed teams in the Scottish Championship. The winners advanced to the semi-finals to face the second placed team in the Championship, and the winners of that tie advanced to the final to play-off against the 11th placed team in the Premiership, with the winners securing a place in the 2021–22 Scottish Premiership.

Quarter-final
3	Raith Rovers	0	2	2
4	Dunfermline Athletic	0	0	0

Semi-final
2	Dundee	3	0	3
3	Raith Rovers	0	1	1

Final
1	Kilmarnock	1	1	2
2	Dundee	2	2	4

=== Quarter-final ===
==== First leg ====
4 May 2021	Dunfermline Athletic	0–0	Raith Rovers	Dunfermline
19:00				Stadium: East End Park; Attendance: 0 Referee: Steven Kirkland

==== Second leg ====
8 May 2021	Raith Rovers	2–0 (2–0 agg.)	Dunfermline Athletic	Kirkcaldy
15:00	Vaughan 64'; Ugwu 89'			Stadium: Stark's Park; Attendance: 0 Referee: Greg Aitken

=== Semi-final ===
==== First leg ====
12 May 2021	Raith Rovers	0–3	Dundee	Kirkcaldy
19:45			McGhee 22', 55'; Sow 84'	Stadium: Stark's Park; Attendance: 0 Referee: Nick Walsh

==== Second leg ====
15 May 2021	Dundee	0–1 (3–1 agg.)	Raith Rovers	Dundee
19:45			Vaughan 21'	Stadium: Dens Park; Attendance: 0 Referee: Don Robertson

=== Final ===
==== First leg ====
20 May 2021	Dundee	2–1	Kilmarnock	Dundee
20:15	McGhee 6'; Adam 47'		Haunstrup 77'	Stadium: Dens Park; Attendance: 500; Referee: John Beaton

==== Second leg ====
24 May 2021	Kilmarnock	1–2 (2–4 agg.)	Dundee	Kilmarnock
19:45	Lafferty 69' (pen.)		Mullen 7'; Ashcroft 12'	Stadium: Rugby Park; Attendance: 500; Referee: Bobby Madden

== Broadcasting ==
=== Live matches ===
==== UK and Ireland ====
Sky Sports has exclusive rights to the Scottish Premiership regular league season and can show up to 48 matches, whilst also broadcasting the play-off final with BBC Scotland showing the quarter-final & semi-final. Due to the impact of the COVID-19 pandemic, clubs can stream matches (not broadcast on Sky) to fans on a pay-per-view or "virtual season ticket" basis, whilst capacities in stadia are limited due to social distancing restrictions.

==== United States ====
Select Premiership matches, along with the matches in the promotion/relegation playoffs, are shown in the United States on ESPN+, as part of a deal that allows ESPN+ to broadcast matches from Scottish leagues.

=== Highlights ===
From the start of this season, highlights were shown on both Saturdays and Sundays on BBC Scotland's flagship Sportscene programme. Sky Sports also showed highlights.

Gaelic-language channel BBC Alba had rights to broadcast repeats in full of 38 Saturday 3 pm matches "as live" at 5.30 pm.

The SPFL also uploaded the goals from every Premiership match onto its YouTube channel, available from 6 pm on a Sunday for UK and Ireland viewers and 10 pm on a Saturday for those worldwide.
