= 2018–19 Scottish Championship =

Ladbrokes Championship
- Season: 2018–19
- Dates: 4 August 2018 – 4 May 2019
- Champions: Ross County
- Promoted: Ross County
- Relegated: Falkirk
- Matches: 180
- Goals: 439 (2.44 per match)
- Top goalscorer: Lawrence Shankland (24 goals)
- Biggest home win: Queen of the South 5–0 Ayr United (1 September 2018); Ross County 5–0 Greenock Morton (27 October 2018)
- Biggest away win: Dundee United 0–5 Ayr United (30 November 2018)
- Highest scoring: 9 matches: 6 goals
- Longest winning run: 6 matches: Ross County
- Longest unbeaten run: 14 matches: Inverness Caledonian Thistle
- Longest winless run: 9 matches: Partick Thistle
- Longest losing run: 7 matches: Partick Thistle; Queen of the South
- Highest attendance: 6,532; Dundee United 2–3 Dunfermline Athletic (4 August 2018)
- Lowest attendance: 592; Alloa Athletic 0–1 Ross County (1 December 2018)
- Total attendance: 561,688
- Average attendance: 3,120 (239)
- All statistics correct as of 4 May 2019.

The 2018–19 Scottish Championship (known as the Ladbrokes Championship for sponsorship reasons) was the 25th season in the current format of 10 teams in the second tier of Scottish football. The fixtures were published on 15 June 2018, with the league starting on 4 August 2018.

Ten teams contested the league: Alloa Athletic, Ayr United, Dundee United, Dunfermline Athletic, Falkirk, Greenock Morton, Inverness CT, Partick Thistle, Queen of the South and Ross County.

Ross County won the league following a 4–0 win over Queen of the South on 26 April 2019 to return to the Premiership after only one season's absence.

== Teams ==
The following teams have changed division since the 2017–18 season:

To Championship

Ayr United secured promotion to the Championship on 28 April 2018 after a 2–0 victory over Albion Rovers. Ross County were relegated to the Championship on 12 May 2018 after a 1–1 draw with St Johnstone. Alloa Athletic won promotion following a 2–1 aggregate victory in the play-off final. Partick Thistle were also relegated to the Championship following a 3–1 aggregate defeat to Livingston in the play-off final.

From Championship

Brechin City were relegated to League One on 24 March 2018 after a 2–0 defeat to Greenock Morton. St Mirren secured promotion to the Premiership on 14 April 2018 after a goalless draw with Livingston, who were also promoted after winning the Premiership play-off final. Dumbarton were relegated after losing the Championship play-off final.

=== Stadia and locations ===
Alloa Athletic	Ayr United	Dundee United	Dunfermline Athletic
Recreation Park	Somerset Park	Tannadice Park	East End Park
Capacity: 3,100	Capacity: 10,185	Capacity: 14,223	Capacity: 11,480
Falkirk	2018–19 Scottish Championship is located in Scotland		Greenock Morton
Falkirk Stadium	2018–19 Scottish Championship is located in Scotland		Cappielow Park
Capacity: 7,937	2018–19 Scottish Championship is located in Scotland		Capacity: 11,589
Inverness Caledonian Thistle	Partick Thistle	Queen of the South	Ross County
Caledonian Stadium	Firhill Stadium	Palmerston Park	Victoria Park
Capacity: 7,750	Capacity: 10,102	Capacity: 8,690	Capacity: 6,541

=== Personnel and kits ===
Team	Manager	Captain	Kit manufacturer	Shirt sponsor
Alloa Athletic	(Republic of Ireland) Jim Goodwin	(Scotland) Andy Graham	Pendle	The Energy Check
Ayr United	(Scotland) Ian McCall	(Scotland) Ross Docherty	Adidas	Bitcoin BCH
Dundee United	(Scotland) Robbie Neilson	(Scotland) Fraser Fyvie	Nike	Utilita
Dunfermline Athletic	(Scotland) Stevie Crawford	(Scotland) Lee Ashcroft	Joma	SRJ Windows
Falkirk	(Scotland) Ray McKinnon	(Scotland) Jordan McGhee	Puma	Central Demolition
Greenock Morton	(Scotland) David Hopkin	(Scotland) Jim McAlister	Vision Outsourcing	Millions
Inverness CT	(Scotland) John Robertson	(England) Carl Tremarco	Erreà	McEwan Fraser Legal
Partick Thistle	(Scotland) Gary Caldwell	(Scotland) Stuart Bannigan	Joma	Just Employment Law
Queen of the South	(Scotland) Allan Johnston	(Scotland) Stephen Dobbie	Macron	Border Finance Ltd
Ross County	(Scotland) Steven Ferguson and (Scotland) Stuart Kettlewell	(Scotland) Marcus Fraser	Macron	McEwan Fraser Legal

=== Managerial changes ===
Team	Outgoing manager	Manner of departure	Date of vacancy	Position in table	Incoming manager	Date of appointment
Greenock Morton	(Scotland) Jim Duffy	Mutual consent	29 April 2018	Pre-season	(Scotland) Ray McKinnon	30 May 2018
Falkirk	(Scotland) Paul Hartley	Mutual consent	27 August 2018	10th	(Scotland) Ray McKinnon	31 August 2018
Greenock Morton	(Scotland) Ray McKinnon	Signed by Falkirk	31 August 2018	2nd	(Finland) Jonatan Johansson	6 September 2018
Dundee United	(Hungary) Csaba László	Mutual consent	30 September 2018	4th	(Scotland) Robbie Neilson	8 October 2018
Partick Thistle	(Scotland) Alan Archibald	Sacked	6 October 2018	8th	(Scotland) Gary Caldwell	15 October 2018
Dunfermline Athletic	(Scotland) Allan Johnston	Resigned	9 January 2019	7th	(Scotland) Stevie Crawford	10 January 2019
Greenock Morton	(Finland) Jonatan Johansson	Resigned	4 May 2019	5th	(Scotland) David Hopkin	15 May 2019
Queen of the South	(Scotland) Gary Naysmith	Sacked	4 May 2019	9th	(Scotland) Allan Johnston	5 May 2019

== League summary ==
=== League table ===
Pos	Team	Pld	W	D	L	GF	GA	GD	Pts	Promotion, qualification or relegation
1	Ross County (C, P)	36	21	8	7	63	34	+29	71	Promotion to the Premiership
2	Dundee United	36	19	8	9	49	40	+9	65	Qualification for the Premiership play-off semi-final
3	Inverness Caledonian Thistle	36	14	14	8	48	40	+8	56	Qualification for the Premiership play-off quarter-final
4	Ayr United	36	15	9	12	50	38	+12	54	Qualification for the Premiership play-off quarter-final
5	Greenock Morton	36	11	13	12	36	45	−9	46	
6	Partick Thistle	36	12	7	17	43	52	−9	43	
7	Dunfermline Athletic	36	11	8	17	33	40	−7	41	
8	Alloa Athletic	36	10	9	17	39	53	−14	39	
9	Queen of the South (O)	36	9	11	16	41	48	−7	38	Qualification for the Championship play-offs
10	Falkirk (R)	36	9	11	16	37	49	−12	38	Relegation to League One

Source: SPFL
Rules for classification: 1) Points; 2) Goal difference; 3) Goals scored; 4) Points in head-to-head matches; 5) Goal difference in hth matches; 6). Goals scored in hth matches; 7). Play-off (only for deciding promotion, play-off participation and relegation).
(C) Champions; (O) Play-off winners; (P) Promoted; (R) Relegated

=== Positions by round ===
The table lists the positions of teams after each week of matches. In order to preserve chronological progress, any postponed matches are not included in the round at which they were originally scheduled, but added to the full round they were played immediately afterwards. For example, if a match is scheduled for matchday 13, but then postponed and played between days 16 and 17, it will be added to the standings for day 16.

Leader - Promotion to 2019–20 Scottish Premiership
Qualification for Premiership play-off semi-final
Qualification for Premiership play-off quarter-final
Qualification for Championship play-offs
Relegation to 2019-20 Scottish League One

Team \ Round	1	2	3	4	5	6	7	8	9	10	11	12	13	14	15	16	17	18	19	20	21	22	23	24	25	26	27	28	29	30	31	32	33	34	35	36
Ross County	4	1	4	1	2	4	2	2	1	1	2	2	2	2	2	2	2	1	1	1	1	1	1	1	1	1	1	1	1	1	1	1	1	1	1	1
Dundee United	7	5	3	4	5	3	4	4	4	3	3	3	3	3	3	3	3	3	3	3	3	3	3	3	3	2	2	2	2	2	2	2	2	2	2	2
Inverness Caledonian Thistle	3	4	5	2	1	2	3	3	3	5	4	5	4	4	4	5	5	4	4	6	5	4	4	4	4	4	5	5	5	3	4	4	4	4	4	3
Ayr United	1	3	1	6	3	1	1	1	2	2	1	1	1	1	1	1	1	2	2	2	2	2	2	2	2	3	3	3	3	4	3	3	3	3	3	4
Greenock Morton	5	2	2	5	6	5	6	7	6	6	6	4	5	5	6	6	6	6	5	4	6	6	6	6	7	6	6	6	6	6	6	6	7	7	5	5
Partick Thistle	10	7	7	7	7	6	7	8	8	8	8	8	9	9	10	8	8	9	9	10	10	9	10	8	10	10	10	9	9	9	9	9	10	6	7	6
Dunfermline Athletic	2	6	8	8	8	8	8	5	7	7	7	7	7	7	7	7	7	7	7	7	7	7	7	7	5	5	4	4	4	5	5	5	5	5	6	7
Alloa Athletic	8	10	9	9	9	9	9	9	9	9	9	9	8	8	8	9	9	8	8	8	8	8	9	10	8	8	9	10	10	10	10	8	6	9	9	8
Queen of the South	6	8	6	3	4	7	5	6	5	4	5	6	6	6	5	4	4	5	6	5	4	5	5	5	6	7	7	7	7	7	7	7	8	8	8	9
Falkirk	9	9	10	10	10	10	10	10	10	10	10	10	10	10	9	10	10	10	10	9	9	10	8	9	9	9	8	8	8	8	8	10	9	10	10	10

Source: BBC Sport
Updated: 4 May 2019

== Results ==
Teams play each other four times, twice in the first half of the season (home and away) and twice in the second half of the season (home and away), making a total of 180 games, with each team playing 36.

=== First half of season (Matches 1-18) ===
Home \ Away	ALL	AYR	DUN	DNF	FAL	GMO	INV	PAR	QOS	ROS
Alloa Athletic	—	0–2	1–1	0–1	0–2	0–2	0–0	1–0	2–0	0–1
Ayr United	3–0	—	2–0	4–1	3–2	0–0	2–3	2–0	1–1	3–3
Dundee United	4–2	0–5	—	2–3	2–1	1–1	1–1	3–1	2–0	1–5
Dunfermline Athletic	0–0	0–0	0–2	—	0–1	3–0	0–3	1–0	0–1	1–3
Falkirk	2–2	0–1	0–2	0–2	—	0–0	0–1	1–1	0–3	1–1
Greenock Morton	0–2	1–5	1–1	1–1	1–0	—	1–2	5–1	2–2	2–1
Inverness CT	2–2	0–0	1–1	2–2	2–3	1–1	—	3–2	0–0	2–2
Partick Thistle	2–2	0–1	1–2	2–0	2–1	1–0	0–1	—	3–2	0–2
Queen of the South	3–3	5–0	1–2	0–0	2–0	1–2	3–3	1–0	—	0–0
Ross County	1–0	2–1	0–1	2–1	2–0	5–0	0–0	2–0	1–1	—

Source: Scottish Championship
Legend: Blue = home team win; Yellow = draw; Red = away team win.

=== Second half of season (Matches 19-36) ===
Home \ Away	ALL	AYR	DUN	DNF	FAL	GMO	INV	PAR	QOS	ROS
Alloa Athletic	—	1–3	2–1	0–1	1–2	2–1	1–2	0–2	1–0	1–0
Ayr United	1–1	—	1–0	0–1	0–1	1–1	0–1	0–1	1–0	1–3
Dundee United	2–1	2–1	—	1–0	2–0	2–1	1–0	1–1	1–2	1–0
Dunfermline Athletic	2–2	0–1	0–1	—	0–1	0–1	1–0	3–0	1–0	1–2
Falkirk	1–2	2–0	1–1	2–4	—	0–2	2–2	1–1	3–0	3–2
Greenock Morton	1–2	0–0	1–0	0–0	1–1	—	2–2	0–3	1–0	1–0
Inverness CT	3–2	1–0	0–2	1–0	0–0	1–0	—	1–2	1–2	1–2
Partick Thistle	2–1	1–2	2–1	2–2	1–1	1–2	1–2	—	2–1	2–4
Queen of the South	1–2	1–1	0–1	2–1	1–1	1–1	0–2	0–3	—	4–0
Ross County	2–0	3–2	1–1	1–0	2–1	2–0	2–1	0–0	4–0	—

Source: Scottish Championship
Legend: Blue = home team win; Yellow = draw; Red = away team win.

== Season statistics ==
=== Scoring ===
==== Top scorers ====
As of 4 May 2019

Rank	Player	Club	Goals
1	(Scotland) Lawrence Shankland	Ayr United	24
2	(Scotland) Stephen Dobbie	Queen of the South	21
3	(Northern Ireland) Billy Mckay	Ross County	17
4	(Slovakia) Pavol Šafranko	Dundee United	12
4	(Scotland) Zak Rudden	Falkirk	12
6	(Scotland) Alan Trouten	Alloa Athletic	10

==== Hat-tricks ====
Player	For	Against	Result	Date	Ref
(Scotland) Stephen Dobbie	Queen of the South	Falkirk	0–3 (A)	25 August 2018	
(Scotland) Stephen Dobbie^{4}	Queen of the South	Ayr United	5–0 (H)	1 September 2018	
(Northern Ireland) Billy Mckay	Ross County	Dundee United	1–5 (A)	29 September 2018	
(Scotland) Stephen Dobbie	Queen of the South	Alloa Athletic	3–3 (H)	6 October 2018	
(Northern Ireland) Billy Mckay	Ross County	Greenock Morton	5–0 (H)	27 October 2018	
(Scotland) Lawrence Shankland^{4}	Ayr United	Dundee United	0–5 (A)	30 November 2018	
(Northern Ireland) Billy Mckay	Ross County	Ayr United	3–2 (H)	26 February 2019	
(Scotland) Brian Graham	Ross County	Ayr United	1–3 (A)	19 April 2019	

Note

^{4} Player scored four goals; (H) = Home, (A) = Away

=== Attendances ===
Pos	Team	Total	High	Low	Average	Change
1	Alloa Athletic	21,215	2,116	592	1,178	+21.2%
2	Ayr United	38,832	3,249	1,559	2,157	+35.8%
3	Dundee United	91,415	6,532	4,201	5,078	−7.8%
4	Dunfermline Athletic	90,153	6,349	4,347	5,008	−4.5%
5	Falkirk	85,371	6,173	3,767	4,742	+1.4%
6	Greenock Morton	34,969	2,757	1,315	1,942	−2.2%
7	Inverness Caledonian Thistle	45,864	4,354	1,994	2,548	+6.4%
8	Partick Thistle	54,771	4,438	1,990	3,042	−31.5%
9	Queen of the South	29,799	3,916	727	1,655	+13.6%
10	Ross County	69,299	6,402	3,065	3,849	−15.2%
	League total	561,688	6,532	592	3,120	+8.3%

Updated to games played on 4 May 2019

== Awards ==
=== Monthly awards ===
Month	Manager of the Month		Player of the Month		Ref.
Month	Manager	Club	Player	Club	Ref.
August	(Scotland) Ian McCall	Ayr United	(Scotland) Lawrence Shankland	Ayr United	
September	(Scotland) Steven Ferguson (Scotland) Stuart Kettlewell	Ross County	(Scotland) Stephen Dobbie	Queen of the South	
October	(Scotland) Steven Ferguson (Scotland) Stuart Kettlewell	Ross County	(Northern Ireland) Billy Mckay	Ross County	
November	(Scotland) Robbie Neilson	Dundee United	(Canada) Fraser Aird	Dundee United	
December	(Republic of Ireland) Jim Goodwin	Alloa Athletic	(Canada) Dario Zanatta	Alloa Athletic	
January	(Scotland) Gary Naysmith	Queen of the South	(Scotland) Stephen Dobbie	Queen of the South	
February	(Scotland) Stevie Crawford	Dunfermline Athletic	(Northern Ireland) Billy Mckay	Ross County	
March	(Scotland) John Robertson	Inverness Caledonian Thistle	(Republic of Ireland) Aaron Doran	Inverness Caledonian Thistle	
April	(Scotland) Steven Ferguson (Scotland) Stuart Kettlewell	Ross County	(Scotland) Brian Graham	Ross County	

== Championship play-offs ==
The second bottom team (Queen of the South) entered into a 4-team playoff with the 2nd-4th placed teams in 2018–19 Scottish League One (Forfar Athletic, Raith Rovers and Montrose). Queen of the South secured their place in the Championship after defeating Raith 3–1 on aggregate in the final.

=== Semi-final ===
==== First leg ====
7 May 2019	Montrose	2–1	Queen of the South	Montrose
19:45	Campbell 43', 69'	Report	Murray 68'	Stadium: Links Park; Attendance: 1,124; Referee: John McKendrick

7 May 2019	Raith Rovers	2–1	Forfar Athletic	Kirkcaldy
19:45	Nisbet 40'; Gullan 63'	Report	Baird 44'	Stadium: Stark's Park; Attendance: 2,007; Referee: Colin Steven

==== Second leg ====
11 May 2019	Queen of the South	5–0 (6–2 agg.)	Montrose	Dumfries
15:00	Dobbie 11', 28', 40'; Dykes 23'; Doyle 32'	Report		Stadium: Palmerston Park; Attendance: 2,001; Referee: Greg Aitken

11 May 2019	Forfar Athletic	1–1 (2–3 agg.)	Raith Rovers	Forfar
15:00	Baird 55'	Report	Nisbet 59' (pen.)	Stadium: Station Park; Attendance: 2,512; Referee: Euan Anderson

=== Final ===
==== First leg ====
15 May 2019	Raith Rovers	1–3	Queen of the South	Kirkcaldy
19:45	McKay 86'	Report	Dykes 17'; Murray 22'; Murray 75' (o.g.)	Stadium: Stark's Park; Attendance: 2,471; Referee: David Munro

==== Second leg ====
18 May 2019	Queen of the South	0–0 (3–1 agg.)	Raith Rovers	Dumfries
15:00		Report		Stadium: Palmerston Park; Attendance: 2,420; Referee: Nick Walsh
