= Tommy Wright (footballer, born 1963) =

Northern Ireland footballer (born 1963)

Personal information
- Full name: Thomas James Wright
- Date of birth: 29 August 1963 (age 63)
- Place of birth: Ballyclare, County Antrim, Northern Ireland
- Position: Goalkeeper

Team information
- Current team: Northern Ireland U21 (manager)

Youth career
- –1982: Grange Rangers

Senior career*
Years	Team	Apps	(Gls)
1982–1984	Brantwood		(0)
1984–1988	Linfield		(0)
1988–1993	Newcastle United	73	(0)
1991	→ Hull City (loan)	6	(0)
1993–1997	Nottingham Forest	11	(0)
1996	→ Reading (loan)	17	(0)
1997	→ Manchester City (loan)	5	(0)
1997–2001	Manchester City	29	(0)
1999	→ Wrexham (loan)	16	(0)
1999	→ Newcastle United (loan)	3	(0)
2001	→ Bolton Wanderers (loan)	4	(0)
2001	Bolton Wanderers	0	(0)
2001	Ballymena United	6	(0)
2001	Linfield		(0)
Total		176+	(0)

International career
1989–1999	Northern Ireland	31	(0)

Managerial career
- 2003–2005: Limavady United
- 2005–2008: Ballymena United
- 2009–2011: Lisburn Distillery
- 2013–2020: St Johnstone
- 2021: Kilmarnock
- 2023–: Northern Ireland U21
- * Club domestic league appearances and goals

Thomas James Wright (born 29 August 1963) is a Northern Irish football coach and former player who currently is the manager of Northern Ireland's under 21 team.

As a player, he was a goalkeeper who notably played in the Premier League with Nottingham Forest, Newcastle United and Manchester City. He also played in the Football League with Hull City, Reading, Wrexham and Bolton Wanderers, as well as in his native country with Linfield. He was capped 31 times by Northern Ireland.

Since retiring as a player he has worked as a coach or manager for Limavady United, Ballymena United, Shamrock Rovers and St Johnstone. He guided St Johnstone to their win in the 2014 Scottish Cup Final, which won the first major national trophy in their history; he left his role there in May 2020. Wright was appointed Kilmarnock manager in February 2021, but was sacked in December of that year. In September 2023 he was appointed as manager of Northern Ireland U21's.

== Club career ==
Wright was born in Ballyclare. After playing in his native Northern Ireland until he was 25, he entered English football with Newcastle United in the 1988–89 season and had a spell as first choice goalkeeper after Dave Beasant was sold to Chelsea in January 1989, but Newcastle went down to the Second Division that season.

After losing his place to Pavel Srnicek in the early 1990s, he eventually moved to Nottingham Forest where he went straight into the starting line-up, however after an injury absence he failed to regain his place from Mark Crossley. He also saw relatively little first team action in later spells at Manchester City and a number of clubs where he played on loan. Early in the 1999–2000, he returned to Newcastle on a loan deal and played for them three times.

Injuries blighted his playing career, and he found dislodging other goalkeepers, once he regained fitness, difficult or impossible.

== International career ==
Wright won 31 caps for Northern Ireland in a ten-year period from 1989 to 1999. The high point of his Northern Ireland career was his performance in Nuremberg in 1996, as Northern Ireland earned a 1–1 draw against reigning European champions, Germany, in a 1998 FIFA World Cup qualification match. Wright had not played an international match in over two years prior to that point and had just returned to club action, on loan at Reading, after a prolonged injury absence.

== Managerial career ==
Wright was first a goalkeeping coach for Norwich City but left when Glenn Roeder resigned. He was then appointed Youth Development Officer at Ballyclare Comrades. In November 2003 he made his first move into management at Limavady United and stayed for a couple of years. Wright was then appointed manager of Ballymena United and reached the County Antrim Shield against Linfield at Seaview. Wright resigned at the end of the 2007–08 season.

He was a full-time goalkeeping coach at Shamrock Rovers for the 2009 League of Ireland season under his former teammate Michael O'Neill. In September 2009 he was appointed manager of Lisburn Distillery. His first game was against his former club Ballymena United, which Lisburn won by a single goal.

=== St Johnstone ===
Wright left Distillery in November 2011 to become assistant manager of Scottish Premier League club St Johnstone.

After Steve Lomas left the Perth club to manage Millwall in June 2013, Wright was promoted to manager. Wright's first game in charge was a UEFA Europa League tie in Norway against Rosenborg. St Johnstone won 1–0, their first-ever away victory in European competition. The second leg ended in a 1–1 draw, putting St Johnstone through 2–1 on aggregate, and through to the third round of the qualifying stages for the first time. Despite winning 1–0 win against Minsk in the first leg of the next round, they went on to lose on penalties. After the match, Wright criticised Minsk, believing they lacked class in victory. After winning two games and drawing once in October, Wright won the Scottish Premiership Manager of the Month award.

In March 2014, Wright was involved in a touchline incident with Dundee United manager Jackie McNamara. This resulted a one-match ban for Wright. A few days later, Wright was taken to hospital after suffering stomach pains. Despite being in the hospital, Wright was still involved in the squad selection ahead of a match against Hibernian. The operation was a success, and Wright made his return in a match against Partick Thistle.

After Wright led the club to a top-six position in the Premiership, he guided them to their first Scottish Cup Final after a 2–1 win over Aberdeen. They were victorious in the 17 May, Final meeting with Dundee United at Celtic Park. It was St Johnstone's first major trophy win. Wright signed a new contract with St Johnstone in August 2014. He signed another contract with St Johnstone in October 2015, soon after the club had rejected an approach from Dundee United for Wright.

He was voted Premiership Manager of the Season for the 2015–16 season, leading St Johnstone to another fourth-place finish and a third domestic cup semi-final, losing out to Hibernian.

St Johnstone secured a third successive fourth-place finish in the Premiership in 2016–17 under Wright, with two games remaining, also qualifying for Europe again.

Wright resigned as St Johnstone manager on 2 May 2020.

=== Kilmarnock ===
Wright was appointed Kilmarnock manager on 8 February 2021. Kilmarnock finished the 2020–21 Scottish Premiership in 11th place, and were then relegated to the Championship after they lost a play-off to Dundee. Wright was sacked by Kilmarnock in December 2021, with the club sitting in 5th place in the Championship.

=== Northern Ireland U21 ===
Wright was appointed Northern Ireland U21 manager on 14 August 2023

== Media work ==
Wright from time to time does co-commentary work for BBC Northern Ireland's football coverage as well as some punditry work for BT Sport's Scottish football coverage.

== Managerial statistics ==
As of match played 3 June 2026

Managerial record by team and tenure
Team	From	To	Record					
Team	From	To	G	W	D	L	Win %	Ref.
Limavady United	November 2003	May 2005	54	23	15	16	42.59	
Ballymena United	May 2005	April 2008	117	44	29	44	37.61	
Lisburn Distillery	September 2009	November 2011	97	36	16	45	37.11	
St Johnstone	10 June 2013	2 May 2020	309	126	67	116	40.78	
Kilmarnock	8 February 2021	18 December 2021	42	20	7	15	47.62	
Northern Ireland U21	14 August 2023	Present	22	7	4	11	31.82	
Total			642	256	138	248	39.88	—

- Kilmarnock statistics include Scottish League Cup forfeit defeat to East Kilbride on 16 July 2021 (ineligible player in original tie in which Kilmarnock won).

== Honours ==
=== As a player ===
Newcastle United

- Football League First Division: 1992–93

=== As a manager ===
Lisburn Distillery

- Irish League Cup: 2010–11

St Johnstone

- Scottish Cup: 2013–14
