= McEwan Fraser Legal =

- Industry: Estate Agent; Law Firm
- Headquarters: Edinburgh, Scotland, U.K.
- Area served: Scotland
- Website: mcewanfraserlegal.co.uk

McEwan Fraser Legal is a Scottish solicitors and estate agency, which sells both residential properties and commercial properties throughout Scotland. It is headquartered in Edinburgh, and has a staff of around 160. It was founded as McEwan Fraser Legal Services LLP in 2009 by Ken McEwan and former footballer Scott Fraser.

== Sponsorship ==
McEwan Fraser Legal has invested heavily in football sponsorship over the years. They previously operated a partnership with Hibernian in March 2009, and sponsored the Rangers Player of the Year award in 2014 as well as the Celtic Player of the Year awards from 2014 to 2016.

McEwan Fraser Legal became the main club and shirt sponsor for Dundee, Inverness Caledonian Thistle and Dundee United from the start of the 2016/17 season. They also sponsor numerous community charities and teams.They were then joined at the start of 2017/18 by Motherwell, becoming their official sponsor also. Ross County joined the list ahead of the 2018–19 season. In May 2026 it was announced the firm will be Falkirk F.C.'s front of shirt sponsor from the start of season 2026-27

== Marketing ==
McEwan Fraser Legal was one of the first estate agents in Scotland to use the radio for property marketing purposes.

== Awards ==
McEwan Fraser Legal have won a number of industry awards. Between 2011 and 2013, the company won a number of awards from the Estate Agency of the Year awards. It won the Millar and Bryce Innovation Award at the 2014 Scottish Legal Awards run by KDMedia.

In 2015, it won silver in the Best Marketing and Best Scotland Estate Agency categories at the Estate Agency of the Year Awards, as well as the Scotland Agency of the Year Award from The Negotiator.

2016, had been another successful year for the business as it won Best Estate Agency in Scotland at the Negotiator Awards; Customer Focus Award at the Scottish Business Awards; winners of the Best Scotland Estate Agency at the Sunday Times Award.

It was a double win for McEwan Fraser Legal at the Scott + Co Legal Awards 2017, as it saw the company win both Employer of the Year and Residential Property Team of the Year on the night. The company also won Employer of the Year at The Negotiator Awards 2017.
