= Stuart Kettlewell =

Scottish footballer and coach

Personal information
- Date of birth: 4 June 1984 (age 42)
- Place of birth: Glasgow, Scotland
- Position: Midfielder

Team information
- Current team: Ross County (manager)

Senior career*
Years	Team	Apps	(Gls)
2002–2008	Queen's Park	159	(11)
2008–2009	Clyde	26	(0)
2009–2014	Ross County	132	(9)
2014–2016	Brora Rangers		
Total		317	(20)

Managerial career
- 2018–2020: Ross County
- 2023–2025: Motherwell
- 2025: Kilmarnock
- 2025–: Ross County
- * Club domestic league appearances and goals

Stuart Kettlewell (born 4 June 1984) is a Scottish professional football manager and former player who is currently the manager of Ross County. He played as a midfielder for Queen's Park, Clyde, Ross County and Brora Rangers. Kettlewell has since managed Ross County (two spells), Motherwell and Kilmarnock.

== Playing career ==
=== Queen's Park ===
Kettlewell began his career with Queen's Park. He made 182 appearances for the Spiders in all competitions, scoring 11 goals, and held the captain's armband from 2006 until he left the club.

=== Clyde ===
Kettlewell became Clyde's first summer signing of 2008, when he joined the Broadwood side on 19 May. He made his Clyde debut in July 2008, in a 2–0 victory over Annan Athletic in the Scottish Challenge Cup. He was appointed team captain before the game. His contract was terminated in June 2009, following Clyde's relegation and financial troubles.

=== Ross County ===
On 11 June 2009, Kettlewell signed for Ross County. He made his debut on 8 August 2009, in a 2–1 win against Airdrie United. In May 2013, Kettlewell signed a new contract at Ross County after the club had finished fifth in their first season in the Scottish Premier League. He had an operation to cure a hip injury just before his contract expired at the end of the 2013–14 season. Ross County allowed Kettlewell to remain with the club while he completed his rehabilitation, but he was then released in August 2014.

=== Brora Rangers ===
Kettlewell then signed for Highland League club Brora Rangers. On 2 May 2015, he scored the winning kick in a penalty shootout, after a 2–2 aggregate draw, as Brora defeated Lowland League champions Edinburgh City in a promotion play-off. Brora then lost a promotion / relegation playoff against Montrose, who had finished last in 2014–15 Scottish League Two.

== Coaching career ==
=== Ross County ===
Kettlewell returned to Ross County to coach their under-20 team in 2016. Under his management, County won the 2016–17 SPFL Development League. After Owen Coyle resigned in March 2018, Kettlewell and academy director Steve Ferguson were appointed co-managers at Ross County. Under their management, County won the Scottish Championship title and lifted the Scottish Challenge Cup trophy. This arrangement continued until June 2020, when Kettlewell was placed in sole control. Kettlewell was sacked on 19 December 2020, after a 2–0 defeat against Hamilton left the club four points adrift at the bottom of the 2020–21 Scottish Premiership table and had won only one of their last 16 league games.

=== Motherwell ===
On 3 October 2022, Kettlewell was appointed lead development coach at Motherwell. He became their caretaker manager in February 2023, after Steven Hammell was sacked. He led them to victories in their first two games, and then became their manager on a permanent basis on 22 February. In February 2024, Motherwell extended their contract with Kettlewell as their manager until May 2025. Kettlewell resigned as Motherwell manager on 27 January 2025 citing the personal abuse he and his family had received from some of the fans, and left the club fifth in the Premiership table.

=== Kilmarnock ===
Kettlewell was appointed manager of Kilmarnock in May 2025 after the departure of Derek McInnes. On 15 December, after seven months in charge, Kettlewell departed with the club second bottom of the Scottish Premiership table.

=== Return to Ross County ===
Kettlewell returned to Ross County for a second spell as manager on 30 December 2025. Under Kettlewell, County were relegated to Scottish League One for the first time in 18 years.

== Managerial statistics ==
As of match played on 14 November 2026

Team	From	To	Record				
Team	From	To	G	W	D	L	Win %
Ross County	2 March 2018	19 December 2020	119	49	28	42	41.18
Motherwell	11 February 2023	27 January 2025	92	37	23	32	40.22
Kilmarnock	25 May 2025	15 December 2025	23	6	8	9	26.09
Ross County	30 December 2025	Present	46	29	6	11	63.04
Total			275	119	65	91	43.27

- Initially co-manager at Ross County with Steven Ferguson until 10 June 2020
- Initially interim at Motherwell and appointed permanently on 22 February 2023

== Honours ==
=== Player ===
Ross County

- Scottish Challenge Cup winners (1): 2010–11
- SFL First Division winners (1): 2011–12

Brora Rangers

- Highland Football League winners (1): 2014–15
- North of Scotland Cup winners (1): 2014–15

=== Manager ===
Ross County

- Scottish Championship winners (1): 2018–19
- Scottish Challenge Cup winners (1): 2018–19

=== Individual ===
- Scottish Championship Manager of the Season (1): 2018–19
- Scottish Premiership Manager of the Month (1): February 2023
- Scottish Championship Manager of the Month (3): September 2018, October 2018, April 2019
