= Lanarkshire derby =

Football rivalry in Scotland

- Location: Lanarkshire, Scotland
- Teams: Motherwell; Airdrieonians; Hamilton Academical; Albion Rovers
- First meeting: 8 September 1883; Hamilton Academical 4–1 Airdrieonians; 1883–84 Scottish Cup 1st round
- Latest meeting: November 30 2025; Airdrieonians 4-0 Hamilton Accies; Scottish Cup, Third Round

Statistics
- Total meetings: 684 (March 2025)
- Most wins: Airdrieonians (177) (Note: Includes fixtures played by Airdrieonians (1878–2002) and Airdrieonians (2002–present))
- All-time record: Airdrieonians (177); Motherwell (174); Hamilton Academical (147); Albion Rovers (47); Draw (145)

The Lanarkshire derby is a football rivalry based in Lanarkshire, Scotland, with matches contested between any two from Motherwell, Airdrieonians, Hamilton Academical, Albion Rovers (based in Coatbridge), East Kilbride, Cumbernauld Colts and Caledonian Braves.

== Motherwell vs Airdrie ==
- First meeting: 11 August 1894, 1894–95 Scottish Division Two
- Next meeting: To be confirmed.

Traditionally known as the 'north-south' derby. The most recent meeting between the two teams was when they met in the NL Cup in 2023, with Airdrie running out 4-0 victors.

The pair memorably met in the semi-final of the 1974–75 Scottish Cup, when Motherwell were going through a golden spell under then-manager Willie McLean. Airdrie caused an upset by winning and going through to the cup final.

This match was always a regularity when the now-defunct Lanarkshire Cup was evident in Scottish football, and in some instances, this match would be the final. As of the close of the competition in 1996, Airdrie had 33 cup wins compared to Motherwell's 32 in the 127 years of the competition being in place, emphasising at the time how big the two clubs were in Lanarkshire.

Since the original Airdrieonians were dissolved in 2002 and reborn as Airdrie United (now again referred to as Airdrieonians), the clubs have only met once in a competitive match, the Scottish Cup Third Round tie on 7 January 2007 at New Broomfield, with Motherwell winning 1–0 and Richie Foran the scorer. The crowd that day were 5,924, a current record-attendance for a match at New Broomfield involving the new Airdrieonians.

Owen Coyle, Alan Gow, Lee Hollis and Kenny Black are examples of players that have played for both clubs. Coyle and Black are also part of only a handful of players to have played for both the original Airdrieonians as well as the new Airdrieonians.

The two teams were drawn into the same group in the 2020–21 Scottish League Cup, ensuring their first meeting in 14 years. Despite being two divisions below their rivals, Airdrieonians would walk away with the 3 points in an excellent 2–0 win.

=== Results table ===
As of: 21 July 2021.

Competition (Note: Does not include unofficial wartime competitions, or regional tournaments like the Lanarkshire Cup.)	GP	MOT	Dr	AIR	MOTG	AIRG
League (Note: Includes matches in different divisions, and from the different eras: SFL, SPL, SPFL)	140	60	26	54	242	228
Scottish Cup	12	4	3	5	19	19
League Cup	13	7	1	5	28	16
Total	165	71	30	64	290	263

== Motherwell vs Hamilton ==
- First meeting: 22 September 1888, 1888–89 Scottish Cup
- Next meeting: To be confirmed.

This match is sometimes referred to as the South Lanarkshire derby, due to both Motherwell and Hamilton both being the two most-southern clubs of the four although since the 1996 reorganisation of Scotland's Regional Councils, only Hamilton is in the South Lanarkshire Council area. This fixture was the most regular of the Lanarkshire derbies since Hamilton's promotion to the Scottish Premier League (SPL) in 2008, and relegation in 2011. In the 2013–14 season, Hamilton won promotion via the play-offs to the newly established Scottish Premiership, so the derby would be re-instated for the next season.

This is a modern derby which has definitely intensified and became more heated over the recent years as coins and flares have been thrown between rival supporters and policing being in large numbers and reports of police brutality have been often made with police using truncheons on some trouble making fans. Seats were ripped out seats and fireworks were thrown at police, in the Motherwell away section during Hamilton's 4–0 over Motherwell in the 2014–15 season.

Fan fights in local pubs and restaurants before and after cause police on horseback to patrol the Motherwell and Hamilton area and surround a one-mile perimeter round each host ground during and for 90 minutes after the match.

Before Hamilton's promotion in 2014, the clubs competed in the Lanarkshire Cup, often the final, and on one occasion 10 fans were taken to hospital after bottles were thrown and fights broke out in the turnstiles as policing was so light before Hamilton resurgence to the SPFL in 2014.

Since the 2008–09 season, Motherwell have enjoyed eleven wins to Hamilton's eight, with six draws (25 league fixtures).

Miodrag Krivokapic, Richard Offiong, Stuart Elliott and Simon Mensing are examples of players that have played for both clubs, with Mensing being transferred directly from Motherwell to Hamilton.

=== Results table ===
As of: 21 April 2021.

Competition	GP	MOT	Dr	HAM	MOTG	HAMG
League	139	67	30	42	244	190
Scottish Cup	12	8	2	2	27	11
League Cup	5	1	2 (Note: Includes 1 penalty shootout victory for Hamilton in 2014 following a draw after Extra Time, counted as a win in the source but usually considered a draw)	2	4	5
Total	156	76	34	46	275	206

== Hamilton vs Airdrie ==
- First meeting: 8 September 1883, 1883–84 Scottish Cup
- Next meeting: To be confirmed.

This fixture is also referred as the North-South Lanarkshire derby. Up until 2007, this match had been a regularity, as both clubs competed in the same division. The divisions that both clubs played in were below the SPL, so this match is not as high-profile than the occasions when one of the teams is playing Motherwell. Hamilton were relegated from the SPL and Airdrie's promotion meant that the fixture was re-instated for the 2012–13 First Division season. Ricky Waddell is an example of a player who played for both clubs.

The two clubs would meet in the 2022–23 Scottish Championship play-off final in May 2023. Airdrie would win 1–0 in the first leg at Excelsior Stadium, and despite a 2–1 Hamilton win at New Douglas Park in the second leg, Airdrie would win the tie 6–5 on penalties and replace Accies in the Scottish Championship.

Their most recent meeting was on 8 March 2025 in a Championship game with both teams in a relegation dogfight, and a dramatic end saw a late goal apiece for both teams, with Airdrie emerging as 2–1 winners through Gavin Gallagher's winner.

=== Results table ===
As of: 8 March 2025.

Competition	GP	HAM	Dr	AIR	HAM	AIRG
League	168 (Note: Includes matches in the 2023 playoffs (Airdrie 1–0 Hamilton, Hamilton 2–1 Airdrie). Airdrie would win the tie 6–5 on penalties.)	56	40	72	255	264
Scottish Cup	6	2	0	4	13	16
League Cup	5	2	3	0	7	5
Challenge Cup	5	0	1	4	4	9
Total	181	60	44	80	279	294

== Albion Rovers vs Airdrie ==
- First meeting: 1 January 1920, 1919–20 Scottish Division One
- Next meeting: TBC

Traditionally this fixture is known as the Monklands derby due to the locality between Coatbridge and Airdrie (they are neighbouring towns barely two miles apart). This fixture is also sometimes referred to as the Monklands derby after the local Council area that covered both Towns between 1973 and 1994.

Due to both clubs usually being in different divisions, this derby has never been a regularity (and even more so since the demise of the Lanarkshire Cup). The teams competed in July 2010 at Cliftonhill stadium, with Airdrie winning 1–0 (the first competitive fixture between the two clubs since the formation of the new Airdrieonians, then referred to as Airdrie United) in front of around 1,000 fans.

Both teams competed in the Second Division in 2011–12, with Airdrie winning three times, but Albion Rovers winning the other game 7–2.

The two teams drew each other in the Third Round of the 2019–20 Scottish Cup, where Airdrie won 1–4 in Coatbridge.

The last meeting between the two sides was in 2025/26 pre-season, with Airdrie defeating Albion Rovers 7-0, with goals from Lewis McGrattan, Sean McGinty, Craig Ross, Chris Mochrie, a Cammy Cooper double & Dylan MacDonald.

Paddy Connolly is an example of a player who has played for both clubs.

=== Results table ===
Updated 23 November 2019.

Competition	GP	ALB	Dr	AIR	ALBG	AIRG
League	43	8	10	25	53	84
Scottish Cup	4	2	0	2	7	8
League Cup	9	4	0	5	20	24
Challenge Cup	2	0	1 (Note: Includes 1 penalty shootout victory for Albion Rovers in 2014 following a draw after Extra time, counted as a win in the source but usually considered a draw)	1	3	6
Total	58	14	11	33	83	118

== Albion Rovers vs Motherwell ==
- First meeting: 18 October 1919, 1919–20 Scottish Division One
- Next meeting: To be confirmed.

Possibly the least celebrated of the Lanarkshire derbies, Rovers have beaten Motherwell several times in Lanarkshire Cup matches, but their most famous victory was on 30 November 2013 when they won 1–0 at New Douglas Park (The home stadium of Hamilton) in the 2013–14 Scottish Cup 4th round.

=== Results table ===
As of: end of 2017–18 season.

Competition	GP	MOT	Dr	ALB	MOTG	ALBG
League	22	16	6	0	65	19
Scottish Cup	4	2	1	1	11	3
League Cup	9	9	0	0	36	7
Total	35	27	7	1	112	29

== Albion Rovers vs Hamilton ==
- First meeting: 9 January 1904, 1903–04 Scottish Division Two
- Next meeting: To be confirmed.

Again, due to Coatbridge and Hamilton being only seven miles apart, this match is also considered a derby. The most recent match was a league cup group match at Cliftonhill on 25 July 2017. The match finished 4-4 and Rovers won the bonus point penalty shoot-out. Hamilton also groundshared with Rovers for a brief period while they were homeless from 1994 to 2001. Since then, there has been no competitive fixture between the two. The two teams were drawn together in the 2020–21 Scottish League Cup group stages, marking the first match between the two since 2003. Unfortunately, Rovers were unable to fulfil the tie due to complications stemming from the COVID-19 pandemic, and Hamilton were awarded a 3–0 win.

=== Results table ===
Updated 24 July 2021.

Competition	GP	HAM	Dr	ALB	HAMG	ALBG
League	79	32	17	30	142	141
Scottish Cup	2	1	0	1	2	2
League Cup	13 (Note: Includes a 3–0 awarded win for Hamilton in 2020, due to a COVID-19 outbreak in the Albion Rovers squad)	7	5 (Note: Includes 1 penalty shootout victory for Albion Rovers in 2017 following a draw and 1 penalty shootout for Hamilton Academical in 2021 following a draw, counted as wins in the source but usually considered a draw.)	1	29	18
Challenge Cup	1	1	0	0	2	0
Total	95	41	22	32	173	159

== Totals for four teams ==
As of: 8 March 2025.

Competition	GP	AIR	ALB	HAM	MOT	Dr	AIRG	ALBG	HAMG	MOTG
League	584	151	38	129	141	127	461	213	584	593
Scottish Cup	39	10	4	5	14	6	39	11	26	57
League Cup	54	10	5	11	17	11	35	45	41	68
Challenge Cup	7	5	0	2	N/A (Note: Motherwell have never played in the Challenge Cup as they have always played in the top division since its inception)	2	15	3	6	N/A
Total	684	176	47	147	172	146	550	272	657	718
Total goals:							2,195			

== Clyde ==
Clyde F.C. are sometimes considered to be a Lanarkshire club. Based in Bridgeton, Glasgow at their formation, in the late 19th century they moved to Shawfield just inside the boundaries of Rutherglen which was a burgh in Lanarkshire until 1975 before it was absorbed by Glasgow under the Strathclyde region. However, Clyde played in the Glasgow Cup and their main rivals were Third Lanark and Partick Thistle within the city rather than the town teams in Lanarkshire.

Clyde left Shawfield Stadium in 1986, playing as tenants for five seasons at Partick's Firhill Stadium followed by three at Douglas Park, home of Hamilton Academical (who themselves became homeless thereafter, also sharing with Thistle) before settling at the new Broadwood Stadium in Cumbernauld in 1994 – the town (about 5 miles north of Coatbridge and Airdrie) was assigned to the North Lanarkshire council area two years later. After several Bully Wee backroom figures including main investor Ronnie MacDonald, coach Allan Maitland and Billy Reid, as well as several players, made the switch from Clyde to Accies in the early 2000s, leading to considerable bad feeling among the fans.

For their part, one of Partick Thistle's biggest rivals are Airdrieonians.

== Achievements by Lanarkshire clubs ==
Up to and including season 2019–20.

Club	Top tier seasons	Scottish League (level 1)			Scottish League (level 2)		Scottish League (level 3)		Scottish League (level 4)		Scottish Cup		League Cup		Challenge Cup	
Club	Top tier seasons	W	RU	3rd	W	RU	W	RU	W	RU	W	RU	W	RU	W	RU
Airdrieonians (Note: Includes achievements by Airdrieonians (1878–2002) and Airdrieonians (2002–present))	60	0	4	2	3	9	1	1	0	0	1	3	0	0	5	1
Albion Rovers	9	0	0	0	1	3	1	0	1	1	0	1	0	0	0	0
Clyde	63	0	0	3	5	6	4	0	0	1	3	3	0	0	0	1
Hamilton Academical	47	0	0	0	4	3	0	2	1	0	0	2	0	0	3	2
Motherwell	104	1	7	9	4	2	0	0	0	0	2	6	1	3	0	0
