= Steven Ferguson (footballer, born 1977) =

Scottish football player, coach, and executive

Personal information
- Date of birth: 18 May 1977 (age 49)
- Place of birth: Edinburgh, Scotland
- Position: Midfielder

Team information
- Current team: Ross County (chief executive)

Senior career*
Years	Team	Apps	(Gls)
1995–1996	Dunfermline Athletic	1	(0)
1996–2003	Ross County	174	(50)
2003–2005	Ayr United	16	(0)
2005–2007	Brechin City	38	(1)
2005–2006	→ Dumbarton (loan)	11	(0)
2007–2009	Stenhousemuir	36	(5)
Total		276	(56)

Managerial career
- 2018–2020: Ross County (co-manager)
- * Club domestic league appearances and goals

Steven Ferguson (born 18 May 1977) is a Scottish football player, coach and executive.

He was appointed assistant manager of Ross County in June 2014, having previously been a coach at the club. When manager Derek Adams was sacked in August 2014, Ferguson was placed in temporary control of the club. He then became academy director, and was again placed in temporary charge of the first team in September 2017. Ferguson was appointed co-manager of Ross County in March 2018, working with Stuart Kettlewell. This arrangement continued until June 2020, when Kettlewell was given sole control of the team and Ferguson became the club's chief executive.

== Managerial statistics ==
As of match played 8 March 2020

Team	From	To	Record				
Team	From	To	G	W	D	L	Win %
Ross County (Co-manager)	2 March 2018	10 June 2020	95	42	23	30	44.21

== Honours ==
=== Player ===
Dunfermline Athletic

- Scottish First Division: 1995–96

Ross County

- Scottish Third Division: 1998–99

Brechin City

- Scottish Second Division: 2004–05

=== Manager ===
Ross County

- Scottish Championship : 2018-19
- Scottish Challenge Cup: 2018–19

=== Individual ===
Ross County

- Scottish Championship Manager of the season : 2018–19
- Scottish Championship Manager of the Month (3): September 2018, October 2018, April 2019
- Footbal Business Awards : SPFL CEO of the year 2022-23
