= Porteous =

Porteous is the name of a Scottish Borders armigerous family. Notable members of the Porteous family include:

== Surname ==
- Beilby Porteus/Porteous (1731–1809), Anglican bishop, reformer and abolitionist
- Bradley Porteous (b. 1998), South African cricketer
- Cameron Porteous (b. 1937), Canadian set designer
- Crichton Porteous (1901–1991), writer and author
- David Porteous, Canadian singer/songwriter and film maker
- Garrick Porteous (b. 1990), English golfer
- Gaye Porteous (b. 1965), Canadian field hockey international
- George Porteous (1903–1977), Lieutenant-Governor of Saskatchewan, Canada
- Gladstone Porteous (1874–1944), Australian missionary and linguist in China
- Haydn Porteous (b. 1994), South African golfer
- Hugh Gordon Porteus (1906–1993), English art and literature critic
- Ian Porteous (born 1964), Scottish footballer
- Ian R. Porteous (1930–2011), Scottish mathematician
- James Porteous (1848–1922), Scottish-American inventor of the Fresno scraper
- John Porteous (soldier) (c. 1695–1736), Captain of the City Guard of Edinburgh lynched in the Porteous Riots
- John Alexander Porteous (1932–1995), columnist and journalist
- Johnny Porteous (1921–2007), Scottish footballer
- Julian Porteous (born 1949), Bishop, Archdiocese of Hobart, Australia
- Katrina Porteous (b. 1960), Scottish poet
- Miguel Porteous (b. 1999), New Zealand skier
- Ned Porteous (b. 1994), British actor
- Nico Porteous (b. 2001), New Zealand skier
- Norman Porteous (1898–2003), Scottish theologian and translator of the New English Bible, last surviving officer of the First World War
- Patrick Anthony Porteous (1918–2000), Scottish war hero, recipient of the Victoria Cross
- Rose Porteous (born 1948), Filipino-born Australian socialite
- Ryan Porteous (born 1999), Scottish footballer
- Shane Porteous (born 1942), Australian actor
- Stanley Porteus (1883–1972), Australian psychologist and author
- Thomas Porteous (1946–2021), former United States district court judge
- Thomas Porteous (footballer) (1865–1919), footballer for Sunderland and England
- Thomas Porteous (merchant) (1765–1830), merchant and politician in Lower Canada
- Timothy Porteous (1933–2020), Canadian former executive assistant to Pierre Trudeau
- Trevor Porteous (1933–1997), English football player and manager
- Victor Porteous, (1893–1966) Canadian Member of Parliament
- William Porteous (born 1945), Australian land developer
- Willie Porteous (1878–1962), Scottish footballer

== Others ==
- Porteous, chain of department stores, New England
- The Porteous formula in algebraic geometry
- Porteous Point, on Signy Island, Antarctica
- The Porteous Riots of 1736
- Porteous's tuco-tuco, a rodent species

== See also ==
- Joe Porteus (1925–95), English footballer
