= Porteus =

Porteus is a surname. Notable people with the surname include:

- Beilby Porteus (1731–1809), Church of England bishop
- Hugh Gordon Porteus (1906–1993), art and literature critic
- Joe Porteus (1925–1995), English professional footballer
- Morgan Porteus (1917–2019), American Episcopalian bishop
- Stanley Porteus (1883–1972), Australian psychologist

== See also ==
- Porteus (operating system)
- Porteous (disambiguation)
