= John Porteous =

John Porteous may refer to:

- John Porteous (soldier) (c. 1695–1736), Scottish soldier murdered during the Porteous Riots
- John Alexander Porteous (1932–1995), Canadian author, columnist and broadcaster
- Johnny Porteous (1921–2007), Scottish footballer
