= 2016–17 Hibernian F.C. season =

Hibernian
2016–17 season
- Chairman: Rod Petrie
- Manager: Neil Lennon
- Stadium: Easter Road
- Championship: 1st (promoted)
- Scottish Cup: Semi-final, lost to Aberdeen
- League Cup: Second round, lost to Queen of the South
- Challenge Cup: Fourth round, lost to St Mirren
- UEFA Europa League: Second qualifying round, lost to Brøndby IF
- Top goalscorer: League: Jason Cummings (19); All: Jason Cummings (23)
- Highest home attendance: 19,764 v. St Mirren, 6 May
- Lowest home attendance: 13,604 v. Raith Rovers, 26 April
- Average home league attendance: 15,394
Home colours	Away colours	Third colours

The 2016–17 season was Hibernian's (Hibs) third season of play in the second tier of Scottish football the Scottish Championship, since they were relegated from the Scottish Premiership at the end of the 2013–14 season. Hibs also competed in the Europa League, Challenge Cup, League Cup and they defended the Scottish Cup after winning the 2016 final.

== Summary ==
=== Season ===
Hibernian finished first in the Championship, earning automatic promotion to the Scottish Premiership. They reached the Second qualifying round of the Europa League, the fourth round of the Challenge Cup, the second round of the League Cup and the Semi final of the Scottish Cup.

=== Management ===
With one year remaining on his contract on 1 June 2016, Alan Stubbs resigned as Hibernian manager. Stubbs joined Football League Championship side Rotherham United along with assistant manager John Doolan, with compensation payable to Hibernian. On 8 June 2016, Neil Lennon was appointed as manager on a two-year deal, with Garry Parker appointed as assistant manager.

== Results and fixtures ==
Win Draw Loss Postponed

=== Friendlies ===
5 July 2016 Friendly	Berwick Rangers	1–1	Hibernian	Shielfield Park
19:45	McKenna 25'	Edinburgh Evening News Report	Cummings 1'	Attendance: 1,304; Referee: Duncan

7 July 2016 Friendly	Edinburgh City	1–6	Hibernian	Meadowbank Stadium
19:45	See 76'		McGregor 14'; Cummings 18'; Stanton 21'; McGeouch 26'; Keatings 86'; Handling 90'	Attendance: 2,522

10 July 2016 Friendly	Hibernian	4–1	Motherwell	Easter Road
15:00	Cummings 3'; Holt 17'; McGinn 33'; Keatings 66'		Johnson 2'	Attendance: 3,481

24 July 2016 Friendly	Hibernian	1–0	Birmingham City	Easter Road
14:00	Keatings 62'			Attendance: 5,094

31 July 2016 Friendly	Shrewsbury Town	1–4	Hibernian	Greenhous Meadow
12:30	O'Brien 55'		Fontaine 4'; Holt 6'; Cummings 61'; Keatings 63'	Attendance: 2,007; Referee: Madley

=== Scottish Championship ===
6 August 2016 1	Falkirk	1–2	Hibernian	Falkirk Stadium
15:00	Sibbald 8'	BBC Report	Cummings 2', 48'	Attendance: 6,458; Referee: Clancy

13 August 2016 2	Hibernian	2–1	Dunfermline Athletic	Easter Road
15:00	Richards-Everton 33' (o.g.); Cummings 78'	BBC Report	Reilly 58'	Attendance: 16,477; Referee: Collum

20 August 2016 3	St. Mirren	0–2	Hibernian	St Mirren Park
15:00		BBC Report	Cummings 22', 32'	Attendance: 4,517; Referee: Robertson

27 August 2016 4	Hibernian	4–0	Greenock Morton	Easter Road
15:00	Shinnie 29'; Holt 41'; Cummings 54'; Graham 74'	BBC Report		Attendance: 14,508; Referee: Muir

10 September 2016 5	Dumbarton	0–1	Hibernian	Dumbarton Football Stadium
15:00		BBC Report	Cummings 32' (pen.)	Attendance: 1,339; Referee: Aitken

17 September 2016 6	Hibernian	1–2	Ayr United	Easter Road
15:00	Cummings 50'; Bartley (red card) 67'	BBC Report	Balatoni 74'; Gilmour 80'	Attendance: 15,056; Referee: Walsh

24 September 2016 7	Queen of the South	0–0	Hibernian	Palmerston Park
15:00		BBC Report	Stevenson (yellow card) 55' (yellow-red card)	Attendance: 3,703; Referee: McLean

2 October 2016 8	Hibernian	1–1	Dundee United	Easter Road
12:00	Keatings 35'	BBC Report	Edjenguele 68'	Attendance: 15,492; Referee: Thomson

15 October 2016 9	Raith Rovers	0–0	Hibernian	Stark's Park
15:00		BBC Report	Bartley (red card) 38'	Attendance: 3,753; Referee: Finnie

22 October 2016 10	Dunfermline Athletic	1–3	Hibernian	East End Park
15:00	Higginbotham 22' (pen.); Moffat (red card) 90+3'	BBC Report	Wedderburn 55' (o.g.); Holt 66' (pen.); Graham 90+1'	Attendance: 7,622; Referee: Muir

29 October 2016 11	Hibernian	2–0	St. Mirren	Easter Road
15:00	Boyle 8'; Holt 34'	BBC Report		Attendance: 14,485; Referee: Robertson

5 November 2016 12	Ayr United	0–3	Hibernian	Somerset Park
15:00		BBC Report; Sky Report	Boyle 28', 77'; McGinn 84'	Attendance: 3,100

12 November 2016 13	Hibernian	1–1	Falkirk	Easter Road
15:00	Hanlon 83'	BBC Report	Taiwo (red card) 25'; Baird 78'	Attendance: 14,551; Referee: Beaton

19 November 2016 14	Hibernian	4–0	Queen of the South	Easter Road
15:00	Graham 8'; Higgins 42' (o.g.); Gray 52'; Boyle 65'	BBC Report		Attendance: 13,861

2 December 2016 15	Dundee United	1–0	Hibernian	Tannadice Park
19:45	Andreu 73' (pen.)	BBC Report		Attendance: 10.925

10 December 2016 16	Hibernian	2–0	Dumbarton	Easter Road
15:00	Hanlon 45'; Graham 76'	BBC Report		Attendance: 13,881; Referee: McKendrick

17 December 2016 17	Greenock Morton	1–1	Hibernian	Cappielow
15:00	Oliver 79'	BBC Report	Cummings 81'	Attendance: 2,156; Referee: McLean

24 December 2016 18	Hibernian	1–1	Raith Rovers	Easter Road
15:00	Boyle 88'	BBC Report	Mvoto 49'	Attendance: 15,409; Referee: Aitken

31 December 2016 19	Falkirk	1–2	Hibernian	Falkirk Stadium
15:00	Sibbald 15'	BBC Report	Cummings 17'; Commons 87'	Attendance: 6,747; Referee: Allan

6 January 2017 20	Hibernian	3–0	Dundee United	Easter Road
19:45	Cummings 6', 26'; McGinn 81'	BBC Report		Attendance: 18,786; Referee: Collum

14 January 2017 21	Dumbarton	0–1	Hibernian	Dumbarton Football Stadium
15:00		BBC Report	Commons 14'	Attendance: 1,523; Referee: Walsh

28 January 2017 22	Queen of the South	0–1	Hibernian	Palmerston Park
15:00		BBC Report	McGinn 52'	Attendance: 3,007; Referee: McLean

4 February 2017 23	Hibernian	1–1	Ayr United	Easter Road
15:00	Cummings 74'	BBC Report	Crawford 4'	Attendance: 14,349; Referee: Allan

18 February 2017 24	Raith Rovers	1–1	Hibernian	Stark's Park
15:00	Cummings 60'	BBC Report	Stevenson 52'	Attendance: 4,172; Referee: Charleston

25 February 2017 25	Hibernian	2–2	Dunfermline Athletic	Easter Road
15:00	Boyle 6'; Cummings 24' (pen.)	BBC Report	McMullan 26'; Higginbotham 46'	Attendance: 14,437; Referee: Beaton

1 March 2017 26	St. Mirren	2–0	Hibernian	St Mirren Park
15:00	Demetriou 35', 46'	BBC Report		Attendance: 3,441; Referee: Anderson

10 March 2017 27	Dundee United	0–1	Hibernian	Tannadice Park
19:45	Toshney (yellow card) 31' (yellow-red card)	BBC Report	Cummings 39'; Cummings (yellow card) 75' (yellow-red card)	Attendance: 9,532; Referee: Robertson

18 March 2017 28	Hibernian	2–2	Dumbarton	Easter Road
15:00	Harvie 57' (o.g.); Boyle 83'	BBC Report	Nadé 37' (pen.); Thomson 62'	Attendance: 14,093; Referee: Duncan

25 March 2017 29	Hibernian	2–1	Falkirk	Easter Road
15:00	Ambrose 75'; Keatings 90+2'	BBC Report	Sibbald 77'	Attendance: 16,140; Referee: Clancy

29 March 2017 30	Hibernian	0–0	Greenock Morton	Easter Road
19:45	McGregor (red card) 90+4'	BBC Report	Oyenuga (red card) 90+3'	Attendance: 15,149; Referee: Walsh

1 April 2017 31	Dunfermline Athletic	1–1	Hibernian	East End Park
15:00	Higginbotham 59' (pen.)	BBC Report	McGinn 12'	Attendance: 7,058; Referee: Aitken

8 April 2017 32	Greenock Morton	1–1	Hibernian	Cappielow
15:00	Shankland 66' (pen.)	BBC Report	Cummings 34'	Attendance: 4,229; Referee: Madden

15 April 2017 33	Hibernian	3–0	Queen of the South	Easter Road
15:00	McGregor 13', 38'; Gray 48'	BBC Report		Attendance: 17,054; Referee: Cook

26 April 2017 34	Hibernian	3–2	Raith Rovers	Easter Road
19:45	Keatings 41', 90+3'; Holt 81'	BBC Report	McManus 67'; Hardie 85'	Attendance: 13,604; Referee: Aitken

29 April 2017 35	Ayr United	0–4	Hibernian	Somerset Park
15:00		BBC Report	Cummings 27', 72'; Boyle 30'; Keatings 66'	Attendance: 2,152; Referee: Finnie

6 May 2017 36	Hibernian	1–1	St. Mirren	Easter Road
15:00	Holt 49'	BBC Report	Loy 60'	Attendance: 19,764; Referee: Muir

=== Scottish Cup ===
21 January 2017 Fourth round	Bonnyrigg Rose	1–8	Hibernian	Tynecastle Stadium (Note: Match moved from Bonnyrigg Rose's New Dundas Park.)
15:00	Hoskins 33' (pen.)	BBC Report	Shinnie 11'; Keatings 15', 76'; Humphrey 24'; Cummings 52', 72'; Stevenson 61'; Forster 82'	Referee: Muir

12 February 2017 Fifth round	Heart of Midlothian	0–0	Hibernian	Tynecastle Stadium
12:30		BBC Report		Attendance: 16,971; Referee: Collum

22 February 2017 Fifth round replay	Hibernian	3–1	Heart of Midlothian	Easter Road
19:45	Cummings 21'; Holt 37'; Shinnie 63'	BBC Report	Gonçalves 70'	Attendance: 20,205; Referee: McLean

4 March 2017 Quarter-final	Hibernian	3–1	Ayr United	Easter Road
15:00	McGinn 7'; Cummings 12' (pen.); Keatings 79'	BBC Report	McGuffie 33'; McKenna (red card) 45'	Attendance: 13,602; Referee: Walsh

22 April 2017 Semi-final	Hibernian	2–3	Aberdeen	Hampden Park
12:15	Holt 36'; McGeouch 60'	BBC Report	Rooney 1'; Christie 25'; McGregor 86' (o.g.)	Referee: Beaton

=== Scottish League Cup ===
==== Knockout phase ====
9 August 2016 Second round	Hibernian	1–3	Queen of the South	Easter Road
19:45	Hanlon 22'	BBC Report	Dobbie 66'; Anderson 82'; Dykes 86'	Attendance: 7,646; Referee: Anderson

=== Scottish Challenge Cup ===
4 September 2016 Third round	Turriff United	0–3	Hibernian	The Haughs
15:00		SKY Report	Murray 16'; Graham 21'; Boyle 76'	Attendance: 1,791; Referee: Anderson

8 October 2016 Fourth round	Hibernian	1–2	St Mirren	Easter Road
15:00	Harris 37'	BBC Report	Mallan 41'; Clarkson 82'	Attendance: 4,393; Referee: Collum

=== UEFA Europa League ===
==== Second qualifying round ====
14 July 2016 First leg	(Scotland) Hibernian	0–1	(Denmark) Brøndby IF	Edinburgh, Scotland
20:45		BBC Sport	Wilczek 1'	Stadium: Easter Road; Attendance: 13,454; Referee: Juan Martínez Munuera (Spain)

21 July 2016 Second leg	(Denmark) Brøndby IF	0–1 (a.e.t.) (1–1 agg.) (5−3 p)	(Scotland) Hibernian	Brøndby Stadium
19:00		BBC Sport	Gray 62'	Attendance: 11,548; Referee: Marius Avram (Romania)

== Player statistics ==
During the 2016–17 season, Hibs used thirty different players in competitive games. The table below shows the number of appearances and goals scored by each player. David Gray was club captain for the season.

As of 6 May 2017 (UTC)

No.	Pos	Nat	Player	Total		Championship		Challenge Cup		Europa League		League Cup		Scottish Cup	
No.	Pos	Nat	Player	Apps	Goals	Apps	Goals	Apps	Goals	Apps	Goals	Apps	Goals	Apps	Goals
1	GK	(Israel)	Ofir Marciano	28	0	21+0	0	2+0	0	0+0	0	0+0	0	5+0	0
2	DF	(Scotland)	David Gray	41	3	32+1	2	1+0	0	2+0	1	1+0	0	4+0	0
4	DF	(Scotland)	Paul Hanlon	27	3	21+1	2	2+0	0	2+0	0	1+0	1	0+0	0
5	DF	(England)	Liam Fontaine	21	0	15+0	0	0+0	0	1+1	0	1+0	0	2+1	0
6	DF	(England)	Marvin Bartley	36	0	21+7	0	0+1	0	2+0	0	1+0	0	4+0	0
7	MF	(Scotland)	John McGinn	37	5	27+2	4	0+0	0	2+0	0	1+0	0	5+0	1
8	MF	(Scotland)	Fraser Fyvie	28	0	18+3	0	2+0	0	0+0	0	0+0	0	2+3	0
9	FW	(England)	Grant Holt	39	6	22+8	4	0+1	0	2+0	0	1+0	0	4+1	2
10	MF	(Scotland)	Dylan McGeouch	23	1	11+7	0	2+0	0	2+0	0	0+0	0	1+0	1
15	MF	(Scotland)	Kris Commons	5	2	5+0	2	0+0	0	0+0	0	0+0	0	0+0	0
15	DF	(Scotland)	Brian McLean	2	0	2+0	0	0+0	0	0+0	0	0+0	0	0+0	0
16	DF	(Scotland)	Lewis Stevenson	42	1	34+0	0	0+0	0	2+0	0	1+0	0	5+0	1
17	FW	(Scotland)	Martin Boyle	43	9	22+12	8	2+0	1	1+1	0	0+1	0	3+1	0
19	FW	(Scotland)	James Keatings	31	8	12+12	5	1+0	0	0+2	0	1+0	0	2+1	3
22	MF	(Scotland)	Andrew Shinnie	32	3	24+3	1	1+0	0	0+0	0	0+0	0	2+2	2
23	MF	(Scotland)	Jordon Forster	23	1	4+12	0	2+0	0	0+1	0	0+1	0	3+0	1
24	DF	(Scotland)	Darren McGregor	43	2	35+0	2	1+0	0	2+0	0	1+0	0	4+0	0
25	DF	(Nigeria)	Efe Ambrose	12	1	10+0	1	0+0	0	0+0	0	0+0	0	2+0	0
26	DF	(Wales)	Neal Eardley	2	0	0+2	0	0+0	0	0+0	0	0+0	0	0+0	0
27	MF	(Jamaica)	Chris Humphrey	8	1	5+1	0	0+0	0	0+0	0	0+0	0	2+0	1
29	FW	(Scotland)	Brian Graham	33	5	8+20	4	1+0	1	0+0	0	0+0	0	0+4	0
31	GK	(Scotland)	Ross Laidlaw	18	0	15+0	0	0+0	0	1+0	0	1+0	0	0+1	0
32	GK	(Finland)	Otso Virtanen	1	0	0+0	0	0+0	0	1+0	0	0+0	0	0+0	0
33	MF	(Scotland)	Alex Harris	9	1	1+4	0	2+0	1	0+1	0	0+1	0	0+0	0
35	FW	(Australia)	Jason Cummings	41	23	26+6	19	0+1	0	2+0	0	1+0	0	5+0	4
43	DF	(Scotland)	Callum Crane	2	0	0+1	0	1+0	0	0+0	0	0+0	0	0+0	0
48	MF	(Scotland)	Scott Martin	5	0	4+0	0	1+0	0	0+0	0	0+0	0	0+0	0
53	DF	(Scotland)	Sean Mackie	1	0	0+1	0	0+0	0	0+0	0	0+0	0	0+0	0
57	MF	(Scotland)	Fraser Murray	3	1	1+1	0	1+0	1	0+0	0	0+0	0	0+0	0
-	MF	(Scotland)	Innes Murray	1	0	0+0	0	1+0	0	0+0	0	0+0	0	0+0	0

a. Includes other competitive competitions, including the play-offs and the Challenge Cup.

=== Disciplinary record ===
As of 6 May 2017 (UTC)

Number	Nation	Position	Name	Championship		Challenge Cup		Europa League		League Cup		Scottish Cup		Total	
Number	Nation	Position	Name	Booked	Sent off (straight red)	Booked	Sent off (straight red)	Booked	Sent off (straight red)	Booked	Sent off (straight red)	Booked	Sent off (straight red)	Booked	Sent off (straight red)
2	(Scotland)	DF	David Gray	6	0	0	0	0	0	1	0	0	0	7	0
4	(Scotland)	DF	Paul Hanlon	2	0	0	0	0	0	0	0	0	0	2	0
5	(England)	DF	Liam Fontaine	3	0	0	0	1	0	0	0	0	0	4	0
6	(England)	DF	Marvin Bartley	8	0	0	0	0	0	0	0	0	0	8	0 (Note: Bartley's red card versus Ayr United and Raith Rovers was reduced on appeal to a yellow card.)
7	(Scotland)	MF	John McGinn	4	0	0	0	0	0	1	0	1	0	6	0
8	(Scotland)	MF	Fraser Fyvie	6	0	1	0	0	0	0	0	1	0	8	0
9	(Scotland)	FW	Grant Holt	5	0	0	0	0	0	0	0	1	0	6	0
10	(Scotland)	MF	Dylan McGeouch	1	0	0	0	0	0	0	0	0	0	1	0
16	(Scotland)	DF	Lewis Stevenson	3	1	0	0	0	0	0	0	0	0	3	1
17	(Scotland)	FW	Martin Boyle	2	0	0	0	0	0	0	0	0	0	2	0
19	(Scotland)	FW	James Keatings	3	0	0	0	0	0	0	0	0	0	3	0
22	(Scotland)	MF	Andrew Shinnie	7	0	0	0	0	0	0	0	1	0	8	0
23	(Scotland)	MF	Jordon Forster	3	0	0	0	0	0	0	0	1	0	4	0
24	(Scotland)	DF	Darren McGregor	6	0	0	0	1	0	0	0	2	0	8	0 (Note: McGregor's red card versus Greenock Morton was reduced on appeal to a yellow card.)
25	(Nigeria)	DF	Efe Ambrose	1	0	0	0	0	0	0	0	0	0	1	0
29	(Scotland)	FW	Brian Graham	4	0	0	0	0	0	0	0	0	0	4	0
35	(Scotland)	FW	Jason Cummings	3	1	0	0	1	0	0	0	0	0	4	1
48	(Scotland)	MF	Scott Martin	1	0	1	0	0	0	0	0	0	0	2	0
Total				67	2	2	0	3	0	2	0	7	0	82	2

== Club statistics ==
=== League table ===
Pos	Team	Pld	W	D	L	GF	GA	GD	Pts	Promotion, qualification or relegation
1	Hibernian (C, P)	36	19	14	3	59	25	+34	71	Promotion to Premiership
2	Falkirk	36	16	12	8	58	40	+18	60	Qualification for the Premiership play-off semi-finals
3	Dundee United	36	15	12	9	50	42	+8	57	Qualification for the Premiership play-off quarter-finals
4	Greenock Morton	36	13	13	10	44	41	+3	52	Qualification for the Premiership play-off quarter-finals
5	Dunfermline Athletic	36	12	12	12	46	43	+3	48	

Source: Soccerway
Rules for classification: 1) Points; 2) Goal difference; 3) Number of goals scored
(C) Champions; (P) Promoted

=== Division summary ===
Round	1	2	3	4	5	6	7	8	9	10	11	12	13	14	15	16	17	18	19	20	21	22	23	24	25	26	27	28	29	30	31	32	33	34	35	36
Ground	A	H	A	H	A	H	A	H	A	A	H	A	H	H	A	H	A	H	A	H	A	A	H	A	H	A	A	H	H	H	A	A	H	H	A	H
Result	W	W	W	W	W	L	D	D	D	W	W	W	D	W	L	W	D	D	W	W	W	W	D	D	D	L	W	D	W	D	D	D	W	W	W	D
Position	3	2	2	1	1	2	2	2	1	1	1	1	1	1	1	1	1	2	1	1	1	1	1	1	1	1	1	1	1	1	1	1	1	1	1	1

Updated to match(es) played on 6 May 2017. Source:
A = Away; H = Home; W = Win; D = Draw; L = Loss

=== Management statistics ===
Name	From	To	P	W	D	L	Win% (Note: Win% is the percentage of matches won rounded to two decimal places.)
Neil Lennon	14 July 2016	6 May 2017	46	24	15	7	52.17

== Transfers ==
=== Players in ===
Player	From	Fee
(England) Grant Holt	(England) Rochdale	Free
(Scotland) Ross Laidlaw	(Scotland) Raith Rovers	Free
(Scotland) Brian Graham	(Scotland) Ross County	Undisclosed
(Wales) Neal Eardley	Free Agent	Free
(Jamaica) Chris Humphrey	(England) Preston North End	Free
(Scotland) Brian McLean	(Singapore) Brunei DPMM	Free

=== Players out ===
Player	To	Fee
(Republic of Ireland) Conrad Logan	(England) Rochdale	Free
(Scotland) Kevin Thomson	(Scotland) Tranent	Free
(France) Farid El Alagui	(Scotland) Dunfermline Athletic	Free
(England) Chris Dagnall	(England) Crewe Alexandra	Free
(England) Mark Oxley	(England) Southend United	Free
(Wales) Neal Eardley	(England) Northampton Town	Free
(Finland) Otso Virtanen	(Finland) Kuopion Palloseura	Free

=== Loans in ===
Player	From
(Israel) Ofir Marciano	(Israel) Ashdod
(Scotland) Andrew Shinnie	(England) Birmingham City
(Scotland) Kris Commons	(Scotland) Celtic
(Nigeria) Efe Ambrose	(Scotland) Celtic

=== Loans out ===
Player	To
(Scotland) Ben Stirling	(England) Berwick Rangers
(Scotland) Sean Mackie	(England) Berwick Rangers
(Scotland) Ryan Porteous	(Scotland) Edinburgh City
(Scotland) Danny Handling	(Scotland) Raith Rovers

== See also ==
- List of Hibernian F.C. seasons
