= Marvin Bartley =

English footballer (born 1986)

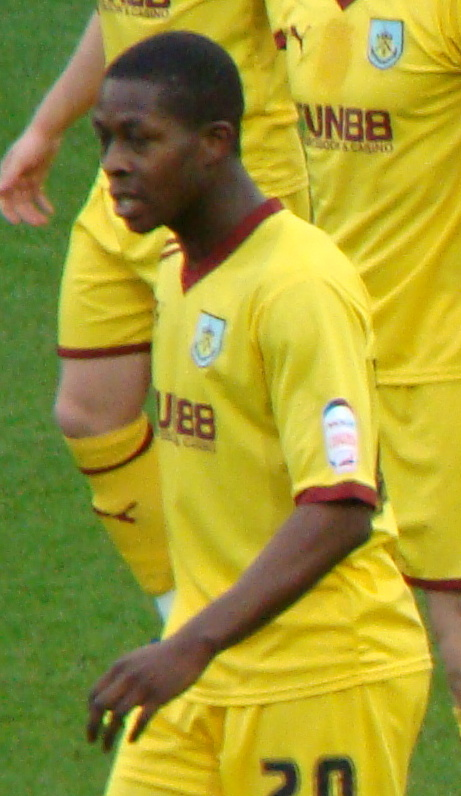
- Bartley with Burnley in 2012

Personal information
- Full name: Marvin Clement Bartley
- Date of birth: 4 July 1986 (age 40)
- Place of birth: Reading, England
- Position: Defensive midfielder

Team information
- Current team: Stenhousemuir (manager)

Youth career
- 1998-2002: Reading
- 2002–2004: Hayes

Senior career*
Years	Team	Apps	(Gls)
2004–2005	Burnham	8	(0)
2005–2006	Hayes	54	(3)
2006	Didcot Town	1	(1)
2006–2007	Hampton & Richmond Borough	27	(0)
2007–2011	AFC Bournemouth	113	(3)
2011–2014	Burnley	65	(3)
2013–2014	→ Leyton Orient (loan)	19	(2)
2014–2015	Leyton Orient	28	(0)
2015–2019	Hibernian	92	(0)
2019–2022	Livingston	61	(2)
Total		468	(14)

Managerial career
- 2023–2024: Queen of the South
- 2026: Livingston
- 2026–: Stenhousemuir
- * Club domestic league appearances and goals

Marvin Clement Bartley (born 4 July 1986) is an English professional football coach and former player who is currently the manager of Scottish Championship club Stenhousemuir.

Early in his career, Bartley played for English non-league clubs Burnham, Hayes, Didcot Town and Hampton & Richmond Borough. He broke into the professional leagues in 2007 with AFC Bournemouth, where he made over 100 Football League appearances. Soon after Bournemouth manager Eddie Howe moved to Burnley in 2011, Bartley followed Howe to Turf Moor.

Bartley fell out of favour at Burnley after Howe returned to Bournemouth in October 2012. He initially moved on loan to Leyton Orient, then joined Orient on a permanent basis after he was released by Burnley in January 2014. Bartley left Orient in the summer of 2015 and signed for Scottish club Hibernian. He helped Hibernian win the Scottish Cup in 2016 and promotion in 2017. After his contract with Hibernian expired in May 2019, Bartley signed for Livingston. He started coaching with Livingston, became assistant manager in 2021, and retired from playing in 2022.

Bartley was appointed manager of Queen of the South in January 2023; he left the Dumfries club at the end of the 2023–24 season. In June 2025 he returned to Livingston as first-team coach, and was promoted to the role of first-team manager in February 2026. He resigned in May 2026 and was then appointed manager of Stenhousemuir.

== Playing career ==
=== Early and non-league career ===
Born in Reading, Berkshire, Bartley started his career with his hometown club, Reading, playing in the youth setup before being released as a teenager. Bartley then joined the Hayes Football Education Development Opportunity (FEDO) program to help develop his skills, of which he graduated from in 2004. He then joined Southern Football League side Burnham where he played alongside his two brothers, Mark and Michael. He made his début for Burnham on 21 August 2004, coming on as a substitute in a 1–0 defeat to Evesham United. His final appearance came in a 3–2 defeat to Sutton Coldfield Town on 30 October. He made a total of eight appearances for the Blues, without scoring.

Bartley then made a swift return to his former club, Conference South side Hayes during the season along with his brother Mark. His début came on 12 February 2005, in a 3–2 away win over Sutton United. He finished the season as a first-team regular making a total of eight appearances for Hayes in the 2004–05 season as they finished mid-table. In May 2005, he signed a new two-year contract to stay at the club. His first appearance of the 2005–06 season was on 13 August 2005, in a 1–0 win over newly promoted Eastleigh. His first career goal came on 10 September, when he scored the second in a 2–0 victory over Bishop's Stortford. His second goal came on 12 November, when he scored the winner in a 2–1 away win at Carshalton Athletic. His final goal of the season and for Hayes came on 11 February 2006, when he scored the leveller in a 1–1 draw with Bognor Regis Town. Bartley remained a first team regular during the season making a total of 40 appearances, scoring three goals as they narrowly avoided relegation. His first game of the 2006–07 season came on 12 August 2006, in a 3–1 defeat to Histon. His final appearance for Hayes was on 12 September, when he came on as a substitute in a 3–2 defeat to Bognor Regis Town.

In September 2006, Bartley joined Southern League side Didcot Town. He scored on his début, coming off the bench to score the second in a 2–2 draw with Windsor & Eton on 24 September. Bartley made a total of two appearances for Didcot before signing for Isthmian League side Hampton & Richmond Borough on a free transfer in October 2006. His début came on 17 October, in a 2–2 draw away at Heybridge Swifts. He remained a first-team regular and on 24 April 2007 he made his final appearance for Hampton in the reverse fixture to Heybridge, which again finished 2–2. He made a total of 27 appearances for the Beavers as they were crowned champions and gained promotion to the Conference South.

=== AFC Bournemouth ===
Bartley was close to joining Football League Two side Milton Keynes Dons after spending a week on trial, until manager Martin Allen departed for Leicester City. In the summer of 2007, Bartley joined Football League One side AFC Bournemouth on a two-week trial, playing in pre-season friendlies against Hamworthy United, Weymouth and Southampton. On 23 July, he signed a one-year professional contract after the successful trial, becoming the fourth new arrival. Prior to joining Bournemouth he had been combining his semi-professional career with installing double glazing for The Splash Group in Reading. He made his début for the Cherries on 1 December 2007, in the FA Cup second round defeat away to Millwall, coming on as a late substitute for Jo Kuffour. His league début came a week later where he again featured as a substitute, coming on for Jem Karacan in a 3–1 defeat to Tranmere Rovers at Prenton Park. On 26 January 2008, Bartley made his first start for Bournemouth in a 3–1 away win at Port Vale. He continued to be a first team regular in the team, scoring his first professional goal in a 2–2 draw with Cheltenham Town on 23 February. His final appearance of the season was on 3 May 2008, a 1–1 draw with Carlisle United as Bournemouth were relegated to League Two. Bartley made a total of 21 appearances in all competitions in the 2007–08 season, scoring one goal.

In December 2010, it was revealed that Bartley was subject of interest from AFC Wimbledon, Stevenage, AS Nancy, Havant & Waterlooville, Leeds United and Leicester City.

=== Burnley ===
Following the move of Bournemouth manager Eddie Howe to Burnley just two weeks later on 30 January 2011, Burnley submitted a bid believed to be in the region of £350,000 for Bartley. Despite Bournemouth chairman Eddie Mitchell having previously stated that no Bournemouth players were leaving in the January transfer window, it was claimed by Mitchell, that Bartley forced the move through by refusing to play for the Cherries again if the bid was rejected. This was denied by Bartley in an online video interview, on 2 April 2020. As a result, a fee was agreed and Bartley became a Claret.

Under Howe, Bartley was a regular feature in match day squads for the rest of 2011, and he scored his first goal for Burnley against Blackpool in a 3–1 home victory, scoring the third and final goal of the match. Despite initially regularly featuring, Bartley soon found himself deployed more from the bench than in a starting role, losing his place to the more established midfield three of Dean Marney, Chris McCann and Brian Stock. The return of Howe to Bournemouth in October 2012 and the subsequent appointment of Sean Dyche further pushed Bartley away from a regular place in the squad.

In November 2012, the Jamaica Football Federation reported that Bartley had shown interest playing for Jamaica (the "Reggae Boyz") and that he was in the pool of players eligible for selection.

On 30 January 2014, Bartley terminated his contract with Burnley by mutual consent.

=== Leyton Orient ===
After falling out favour at Burnley, Bartley joined League One side Leyton Orient on an initial one-month loan deal on 1 August 2013. Following their excellent start to the 2013–14 season, his loan deal was extended. Bartley then joined Leyton Orient on a permanent basis in January 2014.

=== Hibernian ===
After eighteen months at Leyton Orient, Bartley joined Scottish Championship side Hibernian on 17 July 2015 on a two-year deal. Bartley was an unused substitute as Hibernian won the 2016 Scottish Cup Final, their first win in the competition for 114 years.

On 17 September 2016, Bartley was sent off against Ayr United, but had his red card overturned the following week. He was dismissed again on 15 October, against Raith Rovers, but this was also downgraded to a yellow card. Bartley explained that in order for the card to be rescinded completely, he would have had to miss a day of training to go to an appeal, which he was not willing to do. After helping the club win promotion to the Scottish Premiership in 2016–17, he signed a two-year contract with Hibs in May 2017.

=== Livingston ===
In May 2019, Bartley signed a pre-contract agreement with Livingston. He scored his first goal for the West Lothian team in a 1–1 draw with Hearts on 4 December 2019. Ahead of the 2020–21 season, he was named as club captain. In September 2020, Bartley was named as the new manager of Livingston's reserve team, assisted by fellow players Efe Ambrose and Gary Maley.

Bartley became assistant manager to David Martindale in May 2021, replacing Liam Fox. He retired from playing at the end of the 2021–22 season (in which he had not made any official appearances) as that part of his contract with Livingston came to an end.

== Managerial career ==
On 7 January 2023, Bartley was named as the new manager of Scottish League One club Queen of the South. On 4 May 2024, Bartley departed the Dumfries club by mutual consent after their last league match of the 2023–24 season.

Following his spell at Queen of the South, Bartley returned to Livingston as part of David Martindale's coaching team. Amid a run of 22 games without a win during the 2025–26 Scottish Premiership season, on 1 February 2026 Martindale stepped down and became sporting director with Bartley appointed as manager. Bartley resigned on 7 May 2026, following the club's relegation to the Championship.

On 9 June 2026 Bartley was appointed manager of Stenhousemuir, who had recently been promoted to the Championship.

== Media work ==
During the 2019–20 season Bartley appeared as a pundit for coverage of Scottish football by BBC Scotland and BT Sport. In June 2020, Bartley appeared on a special podcast panel discussing his experiences of racism in football with A View from the Terrace host Craig Fowler.

He is also a regular panellist on Sportscene and Clyde 1's Superscoreboard.

== Personal life ==
Bartley was born in England and is of Jamaican descent. He was fined £400 in November 2017 after he was found guilty of threatening a woman.

Bartley accused BBC radio presenter, Tam Cowan, of bullying in December 2022 via social media. Cowan criticised Bartley after he had spoken out about alleged racist abuse of Jair Tavares during a match against Dundee United in October 2022. In the same social media post, Bartley insinuated that Cowan also had a problem with his partner, Sky Sports presenter Eilidh Barbour. Cowan had been critical of Barbour after the presenter had voiced their disgust over sexist and racist comments made by a speaker at the Scottish Football Writers' Association awards in 2021.

== Playing statistics ==
As of 24 May 2021

Appearances and goals by club, season and competition
Club	Season	League			FA Cup		League Cup		Other		Total	
Club	Season	Division	Apps	Goals	Apps	Goals	Apps	Goals	Apps	Goals	Apps	Goals
Burnham	2004–05	Southern League Western Division	8	0	0	0	—		0	0	8	0
Hayes	2004–05	Conference South	8	0	0	0	—		0	0	8	0
Hayes	2005–06	Conference South	39	3	1	0	—		0	0	40	3
Hayes	2006–07	Conference South	7	0	0	0	—		0	0	7	0
Hayes	Total		54	3	1	0	0	0	0	0	55	3
Didcot Town	2006–07	Southern League Division One	1	1	0	0	—		1 (Note: Appearances in Southern League Cup)	0	2	1
Hampton & Richmond Borough	2006–07	Isthmian League Premier Division	27	0	0	0	—		0	0	27	0
AFC Bournemouth	2007–08	League One	20	1	1	0	0	0	0	0	21	1
AFC Bournemouth	2008–09	League Two	33	1	3	0	1	0	3 (Note: Appearances in Football League Trophy)	0	40	1
AFC Bournemouth	2009–10	League Two	34	0	2	0	1	0	2	0	39	0
AFC Bournemouth	2010–11	League One	26	1	2	0	1	0	1	0	30	1
AFC Bournemouth	Total		113	3	8	0	3	0	6	0	130	3
Burnley	2010–11	Championship	5	0	0	0	0	0	—		5	0
Burnley	2011–12	Championship	39	3	1	0	3	0	—		43	3
Burnley	2012–13	Championship	21	0	1	0	2	0	—		24	0
Burnley	2013–14	Championship	0	0	0	0	0	0	—		0	0
Burnley	Total		65	3	2	0	5	0	0	0	72	3
Leyton Orient (loan)	2013–14	League One	19	2	0	0	1	0	3	0	23	2
Leyton Orient	2013–14	League One	6	0	0	0	0	0	0	0	6	0
Leyton Orient	2014–15	League One	22	0	1	0	2	0	3	1	28	1
Leyton Orient	Total		28	0	1	0	2	0	3	1	34	1
Hibernian	2015–16	Scottish Championship	25	0	5	0	3	0	3 (Note: Appearances in Scottish Premiership play-offs)	0	36	0
Hibernian	2016–17 (Note: Soccerbase did not record two appearances made by Bartley against Brondby IF on 14 July and 21 July 2016)	Scottish Championship	28	0	4	0	1	0	3 (Note: Two appearances in UEFA Europa League, one appearance in Scottish Challenge Cup)	0	36	0
Hibernian	2017–18	Scottish Premiership	26	0	1	0	4	0	—		31	0
Hibernian	2018–19 (Note: Soccerbase did not record appearances made by Bartley against NSI Runavik on 19 July, Asteras Tripolis on 2 August, and Molde on 9 August and 16 August 2018)	Scottish Premiership	13	0	2	0	1	0	5 (Note: Appearances in UEFA Europa League)	0	21	0
Hibernian	Total		92	0	12	0	9	0	11	0	124	0
Livingston	2019–20	Scottish Premiership	28	1	2	0	6	0	—		36	1
Livingston	2020–21	Scottish Premiership	33	1	2	0	6	0	—		41	1
Livingston	Total		61	2	4	0	12	0	0	0	77	2
Career total			468	14	28	0	32	0	24	1	552	15

== Managerial statistics ==
As of match played 14 November 2026

Managerial record by team and tenure
Team	From	To	Record				
Team	From	To	G	W	D	L	Win %
Queen of the South	7 January 2023	4 May 2024	61	23	13	25	37.70
Livingston	1 February 2026	7 May 2026	11	1	6	4	9.09
Stenhousemuir	9 June 2026		22	12	4	6	54.55
Total			94	36	23	35	38.30

== Honours ==
=== Player ===
Hampton & Richmond Borough

- Isthmian League Premier Division: 2006–07

Hibernian

- Scottish Cup: 2015–16
- Scottish Championship: 2016–17
- Scottish League Cup runner-up: 2015–16

Livingston

- Scottish League Cup runner-up: 2020–21
