= 2018–19 Hibernian F.C. season =

Hibernian
2018–19 season
- Chairman: Rod Petrie
- Manager: Neil Lennon (until 26 January); Eddie May (caretaker); Paul Heckingbottom (from 13 February)
- Stadium: Easter Road; Leith, Edinburgh, Scotland (Capacity: 20,421)
- Premiership: 5th
- Scottish Cup: Quarter-final, lost to Celtic
- League Cup: Quarter-final, lost to Aberdeen
- Europa League: Third qualifying round, lost to Molde
- Top goalscorer: League: Florian Kamberi (8 goals); All: Florian Kamberi; Stevie Mallan (13 each)
- Highest home attendance: 20,200 (v. Heart of Midlothian, 29 December)
- Lowest home attendance: 15,096 (v. St Mirren, 5 December)
- Average home league attendance: 17,775
- Biggest win: 6–0 (v. Hamilton Academical, 6 October)
- Biggest defeat: 0–3 (v. Kilmarnock, 1 December)
Home colours	Away colours	Third colours

The 2018–19 season was Hibernian's (Hibs) second season of play back in the top league of Scottish football (the Scottish Premiership), having been promoted from the Scottish Championship at the end of the 2016–17 season. Hibs also entered the Europa League, and progressed through two qualifying rounds before losing to Norwegian club Molde. They were knocked out of the League Cup in a penalty shootout by Aberdeen, and in the Scottish Cup by Celtic, and finished fifth in the league.

Hibs manager Neil Lennon was suspended by the club on 26 January 2019, and was subsequently replaced by Paul Heckingbottom.

== Results and fixtures ==
Win Draw Loss Postponed

=== Friendlies ===
30 June 2018 Friendly match	Linlithgow Rose	0–2	Hibernian	Linlithgow
		Edinburgh Evening News	Swanson 51', 82'	Stadium: Prestonfield; Attendance: 2,200; Referee: Hall

4 July 2018 Friendly match	Berwick Rangers	0–6	Hibernian	Berwick-upon-Tweed
		Edinburgh Evening News	Shaw 13', 76'; Murray 28'; Gray 39'; Whittaker 56'; Allan 89'	Stadium: Shielfield Park; Referee: Ross

8 July 2018 Testimonial match for Paul Hanlon	Hibernian	0–2	Blackburn Rovers	Edinburgh
		Edinburgh Evening News	Conway 53'; Tomlinson 56'	Stadium: Easter Road; Attendance: 6,520; Referee: Duncan

15 July 2018 Friendly match	Wick Academy	0–1	Hibernian XI	Wick
		Edinburgh Evening News	Murray 13'	Stadium: Harmsworth Park

22 July 2018 Friendly match	Coldstream	0–5	Hibernian XI	Coldstream
		Hibernian FC	Woods; Mackie 64'; Gullan 70', 74'; Murray 84'	Stadium: Home Park

30 July 2018 Bobby Johnstone Memorial Cup	Selkirk	0–10	Hibernian XI	Selkirk
		Report		Stadium: Yarrow Park

6 August 2018 Friendly match	Tranent Juniors	2–6	Hibernian XI	Tranent
		Hibernian FC		Stadium: Foresters Park

11 January 2019 Friendly match	Al Wasl	0–1	Hibernian	Dubai
		Edinburgh Evening News		Stadium: Zabeel Stadium

=== Scottish Premiership ===
The schedule for the first 33 rounds of the 2018–19 Premiership was announced on 15 June 2018.

5 August 2018 1	Hibernian	3–0	Motherwell	Edinburgh
15:00 BST	Mallan 30'; Shaw 45'; Boyle 51'	BBC Sport		Stadium: Easter Road; Attendance: 17,494; Referee: Madden

12 August 2018 2	St Johnstone	1–1	Hibernian	Perth
15:00 BST	Mallan 22' (o.g.)	BBC Sport	Shaw 51'	Stadium: McDiarmid Park; Attendance: 4,637; Referee: Collum

25 August 2018 3	Hibernian	1–1	Aberdeen	Edinburgh
15:00 BST	Maclaren 86'	BBC Sport	Hoban 45'	Stadium: Easter Road; Attendance: 18,583; Referee: Dallas

1 September 2018 4	Livingston	2–1	Hibernian	Livingston
15:00 BST	Byrne 58'; Pittman 70'	BBC Sport	Horgan 52'	Stadium: Tony Macaroni Arena; Attendance: 5,305; Referee: McLean

15 September 2018 5	Hibernian	3–2	Kilmarnock	Edinburgh
15:00 BST	Mallan 12'; Gray 23'; Kamberi 78' (pen.)	BBC Sport	Brophy 26'; Stewart 44'	Stadium: Easter Road; Attendance: 17,622; Referee: Beaton

22 September 2018 6	Dundee	0–3	Hibernian	Dundee
15:00 BST		BBC Sport	Kamberi 51'; Boyle 54'; Agyepong 88'	Stadium: Dens Park; Attendance: 6,076; Referee: Dallas

29 September 2018 7	St Mirren	0–1	Hibernian	Paisley
15:00 BST		BBC Sport	Gray 14'	Stadium: St Mirren Park; Attendance: 6,082; Referee: Anderson

6 October 2018 8	Hibernian	6–0	Hamilton Academical	Edinburgh
15:00 BST	Boyle 25'; Mallan 34', 71'; Hyndman 39'; Kamberi 90+1'; Kilgallon 90+2' (o.g.)	BBC Sport		Stadium: Easter Road; Attendance: 16,857; Referee: Robertson

20 October 2018 9	Celtic	4–2	Hibernian	Glasgow
15:00 BST	Rogic 8'; Ntcham 19'; Édouard 70', 88'	BBC Sport	Kamberi 63'; Boyle 73'	Stadium: Celtic Park; Attendance: 58,452; Referee: Robertson

31 October 2018 10	Heart of Midlothian	0–0	Hibernian	Edinburgh
19:45 GMT		BBC Sport	Kamberi (yellow card) 65' (yellow-red card)	Stadium: Tynecastle Park; Attendance: 19,410; Referee: Dallas

3 November 2018 11	Hibernian	0–1	St Johnstone	Edinburgh
15:00 GMT		BBC Sport	Shaughnessy 90'	Stadium: Easter Road; Attendance: 17,307; Referee: Walsh

9 November 2018 12	Aberdeen	1–0	Hibernian	Aberdeen
19:45 GMT	Mackay-Steven 40'	BBC Sport		Stadium: Pittodrie Stadium; Attendance: 15,629; Referee: Muir (Note: The referee was initially Willie Collum but after he picking up a groin injury, he was replaced with fourth official Alan Muir.)

24 November 2018 13	Hibernian	2–2	Dundee	Edinburgh
15:00 GMT	Kusunga 1' (o.g.); Porteous 30'	BBC Sport	Miller 45+1'; McGowan 47'	Stadium: Easter Road; Attendance: 16,190; Referee: Aitken

1 December 2018 14	Kilmarnock	3–0	Hibernian	Kilmarnock
15:00 GMT	Brophy 6', 34' (pen.); Stewart 90'	BBC Sport		Stadium: Rugby Park; Attendance: 6,036; Referee: Thomson

5 December 2018 15	Hibernian	2–2	St Mirren	Edinburgh
19:45 GMT	Shaw 56'; Porteous 73'	BBC Sport	Hammill 6'; McGinn 67'	Stadium: Easter Road; Attendance: 15,096; Referee: Anderson

8 December 2018 16	Hamilton Academical	0–1	Hibernian	Hamilton
15:00 GMT		BBC Sport	Shaw 65'	Stadium: New Douglas Park; Attendance: 2,169; Referee: Madden

16 December 2018 17	Hibernian	2–0	Celtic	Edinburgh
12:30 GMT	Slivka 1'; Kamberi 59'	BBC Sport		Stadium: Easter Road; Attendance: 18,142; Referee: Robertson

19 December 2018 18	Hibernian	0–0	Rangers	Edinburgh
19:45 GMT		BBC Sport		Stadium: Easter Road; Attendance: 18,662; Referee: Thomson

22 December 2018 19	Hibernian	1–1	Livingston	Edinburgh
15:00 GMT	Porteous 80'	BBC Sport	Hardie 56'	Stadium: Easter Road; Attendance: 17,056; Referee: Aitken

26 December 2018 20	Rangers	1–1	Hibernian	Glasgow
15:00 GMT	Morelos 25'	BBC Sport	McGregor 86'	Stadium: Ibrox Stadium; Attendance: 49,885; Referee: Dallas

29 December 2018 21	Hibernian	0–1	Heart of Midlothian	Edinburgh
17:30 GMT		BBC Sport	Lee 28'	Stadium: Easter Road; Attendance: 20,200; Referee: Clancy

23 January 2019 22	Motherwell	1–0	Hibernian	Motherwell
19:45 GMT	Turnbull 43'	BBC Sport		Stadium: Fir Park; Attendance: 4,090; Referee: Madden

27 January 2019 23	St Mirren	1–3	Hibernian	Paisley
13:30 GMT	Jackson 24'	BBC Sport	Shaw 61'; McGregor 70'; Mallan 87'	Stadium: St Mirren Park; Attendance: 5,650; Referee: McLean

2 February 2019 24	Hibernian	1–2	Aberdeen	Edinburgh
15:00 GMT	Shaw 9'	BBC Sport	Considine 12'; Mackay-Steven 22'	Stadium: Easter Road; Attendance: 16,269; Referee: Robertson

6 February 2019 25	Celtic	2–0	Hibernian	Glasgow
19:45 GMT	Christie 24'; Burke 63'	BBC Sport		Stadium: Celtic Park; Attendance: 56,730; Referee: Thomson

16 February 2019 26	Hibernian	2–0	Hamilton Academical	Edinburgh
15:00 GMT	Kamberi 17'; McNulty 39' (pen.)	BBC Sport		Stadium: Easter Road; Attendance: 16,265; Referee: Muir

22 February 2019 27	Dundee	2–4	Hibernian	Dundee
19:45 GMT	McGowan 35'; Wright 79'	BBC Sport	Kamberi 26'; McNulty 39', 63'; Mallan 66'	Stadium: Dens Park; Attendance: 6,450; Referee: Beaton

27 February 2019 28	St Johnstone	1–2	Hibernian	Perth
19:45 GMT	Kane 15'	BBC Sport	McNulty 65' (pen.), 84'	Stadium: McDiarmid Park; Attendance: 4,136; Referee: Duncan

8 March 2019 29	Hibernian	1–1	Rangers	Edinburgh
19:45 GMT	Kamberi 76'	BBC Sport	Candeias 43'	Stadium: Easter Road; Attendance: 20,065; Referee: McLean

16 March 2019 30	Hibernian	2–0	Motherwell	Edinburgh
15:00 GMT	McNulty 19' (pen.); Gray 39'	BBC Sport		Stadium: Easter Road; Attendance: 17,184; Referee: Clancy

29 March 2019 31	Livingston	1–2	Hibernian	Livingston
19:45 GMT	Hardie 90+1' (pen.)	BBC Sport	Hanlon 71'; Mallan 75'	Stadium: Tony Macaroni Arena; Attendance: 4,774; Referee: Walsh

3 April 2019 32	Hibernian	0–0	Kilmarnock	Edinburgh
19:45 BST		BBC Sport		Stadium: Easter Road; Attendance: 16,588; Referee: McLean

6 April 2019 33	Heart of Midlothian	1–2	Hibernian	Edinburgh
12:30 BST	Haring 25'	BBC Sport	Horgan 28', 56'	Stadium: Tynecastle Park; Attendance: 19,667; Referee: Collum

21 April 2019 34	Hibernian	0–0	Celtic	Edinburgh
12:30 BST		BBC Sport		Stadium: Easter Road; Attendance: 19,472; Referee: Walsh

28 April 2019 35	Hibernian	1–1	Heart of Midlothian	Edinburgh
12:15 BST	Berra 69' (o.g.)	BBC Sport	Ikpeazu 84'	Stadium: Easter Road; Attendance: 19,395; Referee: Thomson

5 May 2019 36	Rangers	1–0	Hibernian	Glasgow
15:30 BST	Defoe 41'	BBC Sport		Stadium: Ibrox Stadium; Attendance: 49,662; Referee: Madden

11 May 2019 37	Kilmarnock	1–0	Hibernian	Kilmarnock
15:00 BST	Brophy 32' (pen.)	BBC Sport		Stadium: Rugby Park; Attendance: 7,484; Referee: Dallas

19 May 2019 38	Hibernian	1–2	Aberdeen	Edinburgh
15:00 BST	McNulty 26'	BBC Sport	Cosgrove 43'; Wilson 63'	Stadium: Easter Road; Attendance: 18,631; Referee: Anderson

=== Scottish Cup ===
As a Premiership club, Hibernian entered the Scottish Cup at the fourth round stage and were drawn at home to League Two club Elgin City. They won 4–0 and were then drawn at home to Raith Rovers in the fifth round. A 3–1 victory put Hibs into the quarter-final, where they were drawn at home to cup holders Celtic. They lost 2–0 to a Celtic side managed by Neil Lennon, who had left Hibs four weeks previously.

19 January 2019 Fourth round	Hibernian	4–0	Elgin City	Edinburgh
15:00 GMT	Kamberi 21'; Horgan 25', 53'; Mallan 45' (pen.)	BBC Sport		Stadium: Easter Road; Attendance: 7,082; Referee: Walsh

9 February 2019 Fifth round	Hibernian	3–1	Raith Rovers	Edinburgh
15:00 GMT	Horgan 22'; Slivka 38'; McNulty 58'	BBC Sport	Murray 75'	Stadium: Easter Road; Attendance: 9,130; Referee: Madden

2 March 2019 Quarter-finals	Hibernian	0–2	Celtic	Edinburgh
17:15 GMT		BBC Sport	Forrest 62'; Brown 75'	Stadium: Easter Road; Attendance: 15,719; Referee: Collum

=== Scottish League Cup ===
As one of the four clubs participating in European competition, Hibs received a bye to the second round (last 16) of the League Cup. Hibs defeated Ross County in the second round, and were paired with Aberdeen in the quarter-finals. After both the regulation time and extra time periods finished goalless, Aberdeen won a penalty shootout to progress to the semi-finals.

==== Knockout phase ====
19 August 2018 Second round	Hibernian	3–2	Ross County	Easter Road
15:00 BST	Gray 15'; Mallan 70'; Horgan 90+1'	BBC Sport	Gardyne 10'; Mullin 64' (pen.)	Attendance: 8,452; Referee: Clancy

25 September 2018 Quarter-finals	Hibernian	0–0 (a.e.t.) (5–6 p)	Aberdeen	Easter Road
19:45 BST		BBC Sport		Attendance: 11,170; Referee: McLean

=== UEFA Europa League ===
Having finished fourth in the 2017–18 Scottish Premiership, Hibs qualified for the 2018–19 UEFA Europa League. In the first qualifying round they were paired with Faroese club Runavík.

==== First qualifying round ====
12 July 2018 First leg	Hibernian (Scotland)	6–1	(Faroe Islands) Runavík	Edinburgh
	Kamberi 3' (pen.), 21', 48'; Shaw 29'; Mallan 43', 84'	BBC Sport	Knudsen 53'	Stadium: Easter Road; Attendance: 12,501; Referee: Manfredas Lukjancukas (Lithuania)

19 July 2018 Second leg	Runavík (Faroe Islands)	4–6 (5–12 agg.)	(Scotland) Hibernian	Toftir
	Ambrose 1' (o.g.); Olsen 6', 35', 57'	BBC Sport	McGinn 10'; Stevenson 16'; Gray 45+1'; Ambrose 50'; Mallan 70', 77'	Stadium: Svangaskard Stadium; Attendance: 587; Referee: Luis Miguel Teixeira (Portugal)

==== Second qualifying round ====
26 July 2018 First leg	Hibernian (Scotland)	3–2	(Greece) Asteras Tripolis	Edinburgh
	Ambrose 64'; Gray 77'; Kamberi 90+3'	BBC Sport	Kyriakopoulous 12', 35'	Stadium: Easter Road; Attendance: 14,148; Referee: Andreas Ekberg (Sweden)

2 August 2018 Second leg	Asteras Tripolis (Greece)	1–1 (3–4 agg.)	(Scotland) Hibernian	Tripoli
	Tsilianidis 56'	BBC Sport	McGinn 44'	Stadium: Theodoros Kolokotronis Stadium; Attendance: 3,870; Referee: Benoît Millot (France)

==== Third qualifying round ====
9 August 2018 First leg	Hibernian (Scotland)	0–0	(Norway) Molde	Edinburgh
		BBC Sport		Stadium: Easter Road; Attendance: 16,339; Referee: Adam Farkas (Hungary)

16 August 2018 Second leg	Molde (Norway)	3–0 (3–0 agg.)	(Scotland) Hibernian	Molde
	Haaland 35', 82'; Aursnes 66'	BBC Sport		Stadium: Aker Stadion; Attendance: 5,554; Referee: Dennis Higler

== Player statistics ==
As of 19 May 2019

No.	Pos	Player	Premiership		League Cup		Scottish Cup		Europa League		Total	
No.	Pos	Player	Apps	Goals	Apps	Goals	Apps	Goals	Apps	Goals	Apps	Goals
Goalkeepers
1	GK	(Israel) Ofir Marciano	20	0	0	0	3	0	0	0	23	0
21	GK	(Scotland) Ross Laidlaw	1	0	1	0	0	0	1	0	3	0
31	GK	(Hungary) Adam Bogdan	18	0	1	0	1	0	5	0	25	0
Defenders
2	DF	(Scotland) David Gray	24	3	1	1	2	0	5	2	32	6
3	DF	(Scotland) Steven Whittaker	15	0	2	0	2	0	4	0	23	0
4	DF	(Scotland) Paul Hanlon	26	1	2	0	3	0	5	0	36	1
16	DF	(Scotland) Lewis Stevenson	34	0	2	0	2	0	6	1	44	1
18	DF	(Netherlands) Miquel Nelom	3	0	0	0	0	0	0	0	3	0
21	DF	(England) Darnell Johnson	1	0	0	0	0	0	0	0	1	0
23	DF	(Greece) Charalampos Mavrias	2	0	0	0	0	0	0	0	2	0
24	DF	(Scotland) Darren McGregor	24	2	0	0	3	0	3	0	30	2
25	DF	(Nigeria) Efe Ambrose	21	0	2	0	0	0	6	2	29	2
26	DF	(United States) Jonathan Spector	1	0	0	0	0	0	0	0	1	0
36	DF	(Scotland) Ryan Porteous	16	3	2	0	0	0	5	0	23	3
43	DF	(Scotland) Sean Mackie	10	0	0	0	1	0	0	0	11	0
Midfielders
5	MF	(Australia) Mark Milligan	28	0	1	0	2	0	0	0	31	0
6	MF	(England) Marvin Bartley	13	0	1	0	2	0	5	0	21	0
7	MF	(Scotland) John McGinn	1	0	0	0	0	0	3	2	4	2
7	MF	(Republic of Ireland) Daryl Horgan	34	3	1	1	3	3	0	0	38	7
8	MF	(Lithuania) Vykintas Slivka	29	1	1	0	3	1	6	0	39	2
11	MF	(Scotland) Danny Swanson	2	0	0	0	0	0	2	0	4	0
13	MF	(Scotland) Ryan Gauld	5	0	0	0	1	0	0	0	6	0
14	MF	(Scotland) Stevie Mallan	37	7	2	1	3	1	6	4	48	13
17	MF	(Ghana) Thomas Agyepong	9	1	1	0	0	0	0	0	10	1
20	MF	(United States) Emerson Hyndman	15	1	2	0	0	0	2	0	19	1
20	MF	(Burundi) Gael Bigirimana	1	0	0	0	0	0	0	0	1	0
26	MF	(Scotland) Scott Martin	0	0	1	0	0	0	0	0	1	0
33	MF	(Scotland) Fraser Murray	6	0	0	0	1	0	0	0	7	0
40	MF	(Belgium) Stéphane Oméonga	15	0	0	0	2	0	0	0	17	0
Forwards
9	FW	(Australia) Jamie Maclaren	12	1	1	0	0	0	2	0	15	1
9	FW	(Scotland) Marc McNulty	15	7	0	0	2	1	0	0	17	8
10	FW	(Australia) Martin Boyle	18	4	2	0	0	0	5	0	25	4
15	FW	(Scotland) Simon Murray	0	0	0	0	0	0	1	0	1	0
22	FW	(Switzerland) Florian Kamberi	33	8	1	0	3	1	6	4	43	13
32	FW	(Scotland) Oli Shaw	26	6	2	0	3	0	4	1	35	7
47	FW	(Scotland) Jamie Gullan	2	0	0	0	0	0	1	0	3	0
49	FW	(Scotland) Lewis Allan	6	0	0	0	0	0	0	0	6	0

== Club statistics ==
=== League table ===
Pos	Team	Pld	W	D	L	GF	GA	GD	Pts	Qualification or relegation (Note: Teams play each other three times (33 matches), before the league is split into two groups (the top six and the bottom six).)
3	Kilmarnock	38	19	10	9	50	31	+19	67	Qualification for the Europa League first qualifying round (Note: Since the winners of the 2018–19 Scottish Cup, Celtic, qualified for European competition based on league position, the spot awarded to the Scottish Cup winners (Europa League first qualifying round) was passed to the fourth-placed team.)
4	Aberdeen	38	20	7	11	57	44	+13	67	Qualification for the Europa League first qualifying round
5	Hibernian	38	14	12	12	51	39	+12	54	
6	Heart of Midlothian	38	15	6	17	42	50	−8	51	
7	St Johnstone	38	15	7	16	38	48	−10	52	

Source: Soccerway BBC
Rules for classification: 1) Points; 2) Goal difference; 3) Goals scored; 4) Play-off (only if deciding champion, UEFA competitions qualification and second stage group allocation).

=== Division summary ===
Round	1	2	3	4	5	6	7	8	9	10	11	12	13	14	15	16	17	18	19	20	21	22	23	24	25	26	27	28	29	30	31	32	33	34	35	36	37	38
Ground	H	A	H	A	H	A	A	H	A	A	H	A	H	A	H	A	H	H	H	A	H	A	A	H	A	H	A	A	H	H	A	H	A	H	H	A	A	H
Result	W	D	D	L	W	W	W	W	L	D	L	L	D	L	D	W	W	D	D	D	L	L	W	L	L	W	W	W	D	W	W	D	W	D	D	L	L	L
Position	2	2	3	6	5	3	2	2	6	5	6	8	7	8	8	8	8	8	7	8	8	8	7	7	8	8	6	6	6	6	6	6	5	5	5	5	5	5

Updated to match(es) played on 19 May 2019. Source:
A = Away; H = Home; W = Win; D = Draw; L = Loss

=== Management statistics ===
As of 19 May 2019

Name	From	To	P	W	D	L	Win% (Note: Win% is the percentage of matches won rounded to two decimal places.)
Neil Lennon	12 July 2018	26 January 2019	31	12	11	8	38.71
Eddie May	26 January 2019	13 February 2019	4	2	0	2	50.00
Paul Heckingbottom	13 February 2019	19 May 2019	14	6	4	4	42.86

== Transfers ==
=== Players in ===
Player	From	Fee
(Switzerland) Florian Kamberi	(Switzerland) Grasshoppers	Undisclosed
(Scotland) Stevie Mallan	(England) Barnsley	Undisclosed
(Republic of Ireland) Daryl Horgan	(England) Preston North End	Undisclosed
(Australia) Mark Milligan	(Saudi Arabia) Al Ahli	Free
(Netherlands) Miquel Nelom	(Netherlands) Feyenoord	Free
(Greece) Charalampos Mavrias	(Croatia) Rijeka	Free
(Burundi) Gael Bigirimana	(Scotland) Motherwell	Free
(United States) Jonathan Spector	(United States) Orlando City	Free
(England) Tommy Block	(England) Bognor Regis Town	Free

=== Players out ===
Player	To	Fee
(Scotland) Callum Crane	(Scotland) Livingston	Undisclosed
(Scotland) Cammy Bell	(Scotland) Partick Thistle	Free
(Scotland) Dylan McGeouch	(England) Sunderland	Free
(Scotland) Simon Murray	(South Africa) Bidvest Wits	Undisclosed
(Scotland) John McGinn	(England) Aston Villa	£2,750,000
(Scotland) Scott Martin	(Scotland) Hamilton Academical	Free
(Scotland) Danny Swanson	(Scotland) St Johnstone	Free
(Greece) Charalampos Mavrias	(Cyprus) Omonia	Free
(Nigeria) Efe Ambrose	(England) Derby County	Free

=== Loans in ===
Player	From
(Hungary) Adam Bogdan	(England) Liverpool
(Australia) Jamie Maclaren	(Germany) SV Darmstadt 98
(Ghana) Thomas Agyepong	(England) Manchester City
(United States) Emerson Hyndman	(England) Bournemouth
(Scotland) Ryan Gauld	(Portugal) Sporting Lisbon
(Belgium) Stéphane Oméonga	(Italy) Genoa
(Scotland) Marc McNulty	(England) Reading
(England) Darnell Johnson	(England) Leicester City

=== Loans out ===
Player	To
(Scotland) Josh Campbell	(Scotland) Airdrieonians
(Scotland) Ross Laidlaw	(Scotland) Dundee United
(Scotland) Jamie Gullan	(Scotland) Raith Rovers

== See also ==
- List of Hibernian F.C. seasons
