= Florian Kamberi =

Albanian footballer (born 1995)

Personal information
- Full name: Florian Kamberi
- Date of birth: 8 March 1995 (age 31)
- Place of birth: Lachen, Switzerland
- Height: 1.89 m (6 ft 2 1/2 in)
- Position: Forward

Team information
- Current team: Cham
- Number: 23

Youth career
- Tuggen
- –2013: Grasshopper

Senior career*
Years	Team	Apps	(Gls)
2013–2014	Rapperswil-Jona	7	(1)
2014–2017	Grasshopper U21	26	(21)
2015–2018	Grasshopper	32	(3)
2016–2017	→ Karlsruher SC (loan)	15	(1)
2018	→ Hibernian (loan)	14	(9)
2018–2020	Hibernian	53	(11)
2020	→ Rangers (loan)	6	(1)
2020–2022	St. Gallen	8	(0)
2021	→ Aberdeen (loan)	11	(0)
2021–2022	→ Sheffield Wednesday (loan)	23	(4)
2022	Winterthur	13	(1)
2023	Huddersfield Town	1	(0)
2023–2024	Slaven Belupo	5	(0)
2024	Politehnica Iași	16	(2)
2025–2026	Rapperswil-Jona	44	(9)
2026–	Cham	7	(3)

International career^{‡}
2015	Switzerland U20	1	(0)
2015–2016	Switzerland U21	4	(1)
- * Club domestic league appearances and goals as of 26 September 2026 ‡ National team caps and goals as of 28 March 2021

Florian Kamberi (born 8 March 1995) is a professional footballer who plays as a forward for Swiss Promotion League club Cham.

Kamberi has previously played for Grasshopper, Karlsruher SC, Hibernian, Rangers and Huddersfield Town. He represented Switzerland at the under-21 level, and has since been selected for the Albania squad.

== Club career ==
=== Grasshoppers ===
Kamberi started his professional career with Swiss club Grasshoppers. On 31 August 2016, Kamberi was loaned to Karlsruher SC for the 2016–17 season in 2. Bundesliga.

=== Hibernian ===
Kamberi went on trial with Scottish Premiership club Hibernian in January 2018, and moved there on loan on 31 January. Kamberi made his debut for Hibernian later that day, and scored the first goal in a 2–1 win against Motherwell. Kamberi scored a hat-trick for Hibs on 3 April, in a 3–1 win against Hamilton.

In June 2018, Hibernian signed Kamberi to a three-year contract. Kamberi scored a hat-trick in a Europa League qualifier against NSÍ Runavík on 12 July.

==== Loan spell to Rangers ====
Kamberi moved on loan to Rangers on 31 January 2020. Following the end of this loan period, and after a period spent in Switzerland during the COVID-19 pandemic, Kamberi returned to Hibernian for pre-season training in June 2020.

=== St. Gallen ===
On 6 August 2020, Kamberi moved back to his native Switzerland to sign for St. Gallen on a three-year deal. Kamberi tested positive for COVID-19 in November 2020, and played infrequently for St. Gallen during the early part of the 2020–21 season.

Kamberi was released from his contract by St. Gallen on 23 June 2022.

==== Loan spell to Aberdeen ====
On 1 February 2021, Kamberi completed a loan switch back to Scotland to sign with Aberdeen until the end of the season.

==== Sheffield Wednesday (loan) ====
On 30 July 2021, Kamberi moved on a season-long loan deal to England to join recently relegated League One side Sheffield Wednesday. He would make his debut on the opening day of the season against Charlton Athletic coming off the bench to replace Callum Paterson after he suffered a nasty head injury. He scored his first goal for the club in a 2–0 win at Rotherham United on 21 August 2021.

=== Winterthur ===
On 7 July 2022, Kamberi signed with Winterthur. His contract with the club was cancelled on 29 November 2022.

=== Huddersfield Town ===
On 5 January 2023, Kamberi joined EFL Championship side Huddersfield Town on a short-term deal until the end of the season.

=== Slaven Belupo ===
On 11 October 2023, Kamberi joined Croatian Football League club Slaven Belupo on a contract until the end of the season.

== International career ==
Kamberi was born in Switzerland and is of Kosovan descent, which made him eligible to represent Switzerland, Kosovo and Albania. Kamberi played in youth internationals for Switzerland, and he scored for their under-21 team in a 1–1 draw against England in March 2016.

Kamberi was included in the Albania squad for the first time in November 2019. Delays in processing the paperwork required to transfer his international status from Switzerland to Albania, and a slight ankle injury, meant that he was unable to play in their matches with Andorra and France.

On 17 March 2021, Kamberi was called up by the Albania national team ahead of their World Cup Qualifiers against Andorra, England and San Marino.

== Career statistics ==
As of 13 December 2024

Appearances and goals by club, season and competition
Club	Season	League			National Cup		League Cup		Other		Total	
Club	Season	Division	Apps	Goals	Apps	Goals	Apps	Goals	Apps	Goals	Apps	Goals
Rapperswil-Jona	2013–14	1. Liga Classic	7	1	0	0	—		2 (Note: Appearances in 1. Liga Classic-Play-off)	0	9	1
Grasshopper U21	2014–15	1. Liga Classic	21	15	—		—		—		21	15
Grasshopper U21	2015–16	1. Liga Classic	3	4	—		—		—		3	4
Grasshopper U21	2017–18	1. Liga Classic	2	2	—		—		—		2	2
Grasshopper U21	Total		26	21	—		—		—		26	21
Grasshopper	2015–16	Swiss Super League	28	3	1	0	—		—		29	3
Grasshopper	2016–17	Swiss Super League	4	0	0	0	—		5 (Note: Appearances in the Europa League)	0	9	0
Grasshopper	Total		32	3	1	0	—		5	0	38	3
Karlsruher SC (loan)	2016–17	2. Bundesliga	15	1	0	0	—		—		15	1
Hibernian (loan)	2017–18	Scottish Premiership	14	9	0	0	0	0	—		14	9
Hibernian	2018–19 (Note: Soccerbase did not record appearances made by Kamberi against NSI Runavik on 19 July and Asteras Tripolis on 26 July and 2 August, and Molde on 9 August and 16 August 2018.)	Scottish Premiership	33	8	3	1	1	0	6	4	43	13
Hibernian	2019–20	Scottish Premiership	20	3	2	0	5	5	—		27	8
Hibernian	Total		53	11	5	1	6	5	6	4	70	21
Rangers (loan)	2019–20	Scottish Premiership	6	1	0	0	0	0	3	0	9	1
St. Gallen	2020–21	Swiss Super League	8	0	0	0	—		1	0	9	0
Aberdeen (loan)	2020–21	Scottish Premiership	11	0	3	1	0	0	0	0	14	1
Sheffield Wednesday (loan)	2021–22	EFL League One	23	4	2	0	0	0	2 (Note: Appearance(s) in Football League Trophy)	1	27	5
Winterthur	2022–23	Swiss Super League	13	1	1	0	—		0	0	14	1
Huddersfield Town	2022–23	Championship	1	0	1	1	—		—		2	1
Slaven Belupo	2023–24	HNL	5	0	1	0	—		—		6	0
Politehnica Iași	2024–25	Liga I	16	2	0	0	—		—		16	2
Career total			230	54	14	3	6	5	19	5	268	67
