= Vykintas Slivka =

Lithuanian footballer

Personal information
- Date of birth: 29 April 1995 (age 31)
- Place of birth: Panevėžys, Lithuania
- Height: 1.90 m (6 ft 3 in)
- Position: Midfielder

Team information
- Current team: Kauno Žalgiris
- Number: 14

Youth career
- Ekranas
- 2013–2014: Juventus

Senior career*
Years	Team	Apps	(Gls)
2014–2017	Juventus	0	(0)
2014	→ Modena (loan)	0	(0)
2015	→ Gorica (loan)	12	(1)
2015–2017	→ Den Bosch (loan)	40	(2)
2017	→ Ascoli (loan)	6	(0)
2017–2020	Hibernian	67	(3)
2020–2022	Apollon Smyrnis	52	(2)
2022–2024	Lamia	62	(7)
2024–2026	Sagan Tosu	48	(4)
2026–	Kauno Žalgiris	2	(0)

International career^{‡}
2015–	Lithuania	76	(3)
- * Club domestic league appearances and goals as of 29 November 2025 ‡ National team caps and goals as of 4 October 2026

Vykintas Slivka (born 29 April 1995) is a Lithuanian professional footballer who plays as a midfielder for Toplyga club Kauno Žalgiris and the Lithuania national team.

== Club career ==
Slivka signed for Italian club Juventus in 2014. He was loaned to Modena, Gorica, Den Bosch and Ascoli over the next three seasons.

He left Juventus in July 2017, signing a three-year contract with Hibernian. He scored his first goal for Hibernian on 12 August, in a 3–2 win against Rangers. Slivka missed over two months of the 2017–18 season due to a hamstring injury. In his first appearance after the injury, Slivka scored the second goal for Hibs in a 2–1 win against Celtic. During the following season Slivka maintained an unusual streak of only scoring goals for Hibs against either half of the Old Firm, scoring in the first minute of a 2–0 win at home to Celtic. Slivka was one of three first team players released by Hibs at the end of the 2019–20 season.

On 31 August 2020, Slivka signed for Super League Greece club Apollon Smyrnis.

== International career ==
On 5 June 2015, Slivka made his debut for Lithuania in a friendly match against Hungary. During 2018 FIFA World Cup qualification, Slivka scored goals against Slovenia and Malta.

== Career statistics ==
=== Club ===
As of 19 May 2024

Appearances and goals by club, season and competition
Club	Season	League			National cup		League cup		Other		Total	
Club	Season	Division	Apps	Goals	Apps	Goals	Apps	Goals	Apps	Goals	Apps	Goals
Gorica	2014–15	PrvaLiga	12	1	0	0	—		—		12	1
Den Bosch	2015–16	Eerste Divisie	28	2	4	1	—		—		32	3
Den Bosch	2016–17	Eerste Divisie	12	0	1	0	—		—		13	0
Den Bosch	Total		40	2	5	1	0	0	0	0	45	3
Ascoli	2016–17	Serie B	6	0	0	0	—		—		6	0
Hibernian	2017–18	Scottish Premiership	22	2	1	0	4	0	—		27	2
Hibernian	2018–19 (Note: Soccerbase did not record appearances made by Slivka against NSI Runavik on 19 July, Asteras Tripolis on 26 July and 2 August, and Molde on 9 August and 16 August 2018.)	Scottish Premiership	29	1	3	1	1	0	6	0	39	2
Hibernian	2019–20	Scottish Premiership	16	0	0	0	2	0	—		18	0
Hibernian	Total		67	3	4	1	7	0	6	0	84	4
Apollon Smyrnis	2020–21	Super League Greece	26	1	1	0	—		—		27	1
Apollon Smyrnis	2021–22	Super League Greece	26	1	1	0	—		—		27	1
Apollon Smyrnis	Total		52	2	2	0	0	0	0	0	54	2
Lamia	2022–23	Super League Greece	29	1	5	0	—		—		34	1
Lamia	2023–24	Super League Greece	33	6	0	0	—		—		33	6
Lamia	Total		62	7	5	0	0	0	0	0	67	7
Career total			213	14	11	2	7	0	6	0	236	16

=== International ===
As of 30 August 2022

Appearances and goals by national team and year
National team	Year	Apps	Goals
Lithuania	2015	7	0
Lithuania	2016	9	1
Lithuania	2017	7	1
Lithuania	2018	9	0
Lithuania	2019	6	0
Lithuania	2020	3	0
Lithuania	2021	7	0
Lithuania	2022	4	0
Total		52	2

Scores and results list Lithuania's goal tally first, score column indicates score after each Slivka goal.

List of international goals scored by Vykintas Slivka
No.	Date	Venue	Opponent	Score	Result	Competition
1	4 September 2016	LFF Stadium, Vilnius, Lithuania	Slovenia	2–0	2–2	2018 FIFA World Cup qualification
2	5 October 2017	Ta' Qali National Stadium, Ta' Qali, Malta	Malta	1–1	1–1	2018 FIFA World Cup qualification
3	22 September 2022	LFF Stadium, Vilnius, Lithuania	Faroe Islands	1–1	1–1	2022–23 UEFA Nations League

== Honours ==
Juventus

- Serie A: 2013–14

Kauno Žalgiris

- Toplyga: 2026
- Lithuanian Cup: 2026
