= Ofir Marciano =

Israeli footballer (born 1989)

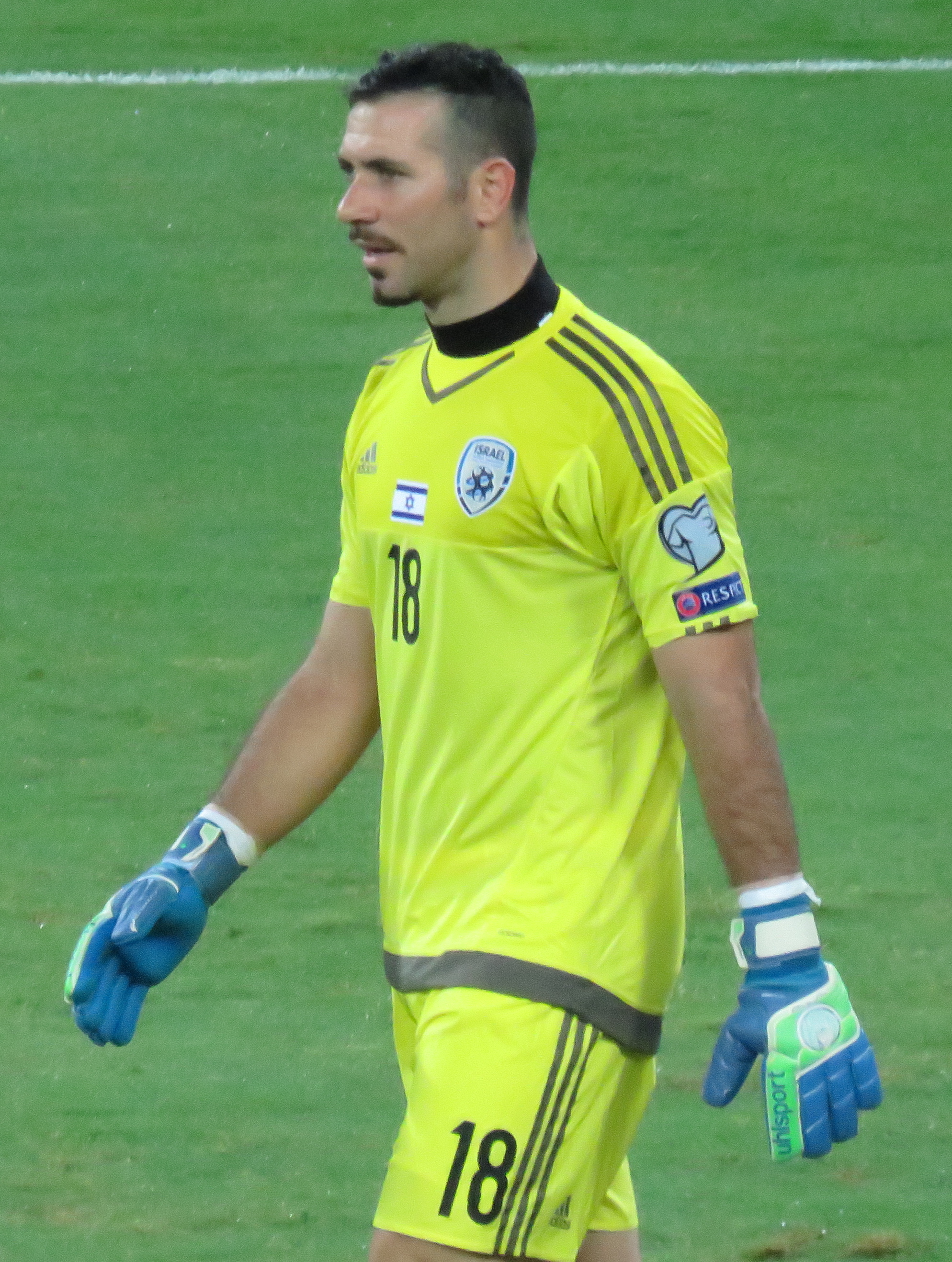
- Marciano playing for Israel at the 2016 UEFA Euro qualifiers

Personal information
- Full name: Ofir Meir Marciano
- Date of birth: 7 October 1989 (age 37)
- Place of birth: Ashdod, Israel
- Height: 1.93 m (6 ft 4 in)
- Position: Goalkeeper

Team information
- Current team: Hapoel Be'er Sheva
- Number: 1

Youth career
- 1999–2008: Ashdod

Senior career*
Years	Team	Apps	(Gls)
2008–2017	Ashdod	139	(0)
2015–2016	→ Royal Excel Mouscron (loan)	6	(0)
2016–2017	→ Hibernian (loan)	21	(0)
2017–2021	Hibernian	105	(0)
2021–2023	Feyenoord	12	(0)
2023–	Hapoel Be'er Sheva	29	(0)

International career^{‡}
2014–	Israel	40	(0)
- * Club domestic league appearances and goals as of 23:35, 26 October 2026 (UTC) ‡ National team caps and goals as of 13:57, 27 October 2026 (UTC)

Ofir Meir Marciano (or Martziano, Hebrew: אופיר מאיר מרציאנו; born 7 October 1989) is an Israeli professional footballer who plays as an goalkeeper for Israeli Premier League club Hapoel Be'er Sheva and is a former member of the Israel national team.

== Early and personal life ==
Marciano was born and raised in Ashdod, Israel, to a family of Sephardic Jewish descent.

He married Israeli model Shelly Regev in 2016. They have two sons.

== Club career ==
=== Ashdod ===
Marciano signed for Ashdod in 2008, and made over 130 Israeli Premier League appearances for the Israeli club.

=== Mouscron ===
On 7 July 2015, Marciano signed a season-long loan deal with top division Belgian First Division A club Mouscron.

=== Hibernian ===
In August 2016, he signed for Scottish club Hibernian on loan for the 2016–17 season, although regulations held up his eligibility to play for the club. Marciano said that he was sold on the move by fellow Israeli footballer Nir Bitton, who plays for Celtic. Following a three-week delay, it was announced on 26 August 2016 that Marciano had obtained his work permit. He made his debut for the club on the following day, in a 4–0 win against Greenock Morton. Marciano made 21 league appearances as Hibernian won the 2016–17 Scottish Championship, eventually helping his club earn their promotion to the top division of the Scottish Premiership.

In June 2017, he signed a four-year deal with Hibernian. Marciano was replaced in the team by Ross Laidlaw in September, missing one game due to observing Yom Kippur. Marciano regained his place, but in June 2018 he underwent surgery on a finger injury. This caused him to miss matches early in the 2018–19 season, which led to Hibs signing Hungarian goalkeeper Adam Bogdan. Marciano resumed training in October 2018 and subsequently regained the starting position with Hibs.

Chris Maxwell replaced Marciano as first choice early in the 2019–20 season, but the Israeli regained his place during December 2019. Marciano continued as first choice during the 2020–21 season, but advised the club in March 2021 that he would not sign a new contract – eventually finishing that 2020–21 Scottish Premiership season with Hibernian in the 3rd place, as well as making over 120 appearances for the Scottish club.

=== Feyenoord ===
Marciano signed a two-year contract with for Dutch top division Eredivisie club Feyenoord in June 2021.

On 19 August 2021, Marciano made his debut playing for Feyenoord during the first leg of a qualifying play-off round match of the UEFA Europa Conference League, that ended in a 5–0 home win against Swedish side Elfsborg for his team. As well as playing in the second leg against Swedish side Elfsborg, that ended in a 3–1 win for Elfsborg. On 25 November 2021, he played for Feyenoord during a group stage match against Czech side Slavia Prague, that ended in a 2–2 away draw. In March and April 2022, Marciano played regularly due to an injury to first choice goalkeeper Justin Bijlow. Marciano helped the team reach the 2022 UEFA Europa Conference League Final, defeating Marseille 3–2 on aggregate in the semi-final. Bijlow recovered from injury in time for the final.

=== Hapoel Be'er Sheva ===
On 15 June 2023 signed for 3 years in the Israeli Premier League club Hapoel Be'er Sheva.

== International career ==
Marciano made his international debut on 10 October 2014, as the Israel national team won 2–1 against Cyprus, during a UEFA Euro 2016 qualifying away match. Marciano was recalled to the Israel squad in November 2016, but had to withdraw after suffering a knee injury in training. Marciano was recalled to the national squad in March 2019, and played as Israel's on-and-off first choice goalkeeper since the UEFA Euro 2020 qualifiers. He then established his permanent first position for Israel all throughout the 2020–21 UEFA Nations League and the 2022 FIFA World Cup qualification (UEFA).

On 29 March 2020, Marciano was given the captain armband of the Israel national (after first captain Bibras Natcho was substituted out right after the first half), in a home friendly match against Romania that ended in a 2–2 draw.

== Career statistics ==
=== Club ===
As of 15 May 2022

Appearances and goals by club, season and competition
Club	Season	League			National cup (Note: Includes Israel State Cup, Scottish Cup, KNVB Cup)		League cup (Note: Includes Toto Cup, Scottish League Cup)		Europe		Other		Total	
Club	Season	Division	Apps	Goals	Apps	Goals	Apps	Goals	Apps	Goals	Apps	Goals	Apps	Goals
Ashdod	2009–10	Israeli Premier League	2	0	—		—		—		—		2	0
Ashdod	2010–11	Israeli Premier League	9	0	—		—		—		—		9	0
Ashdod	2011–12	Israeli Premier League	35	0	—		—		—		—		35	0
Ashdod	2012–13	Israeli Premier League	32	0	—		3	0	—		—		35	0
Ashdod	2013–14	Israeli Premier League	28	0	1	0	—		—		—		29	0
Ashdod	2014–15	Israeli Premier League	33	0	2	0	5	0	—		—		40	0
Ashdod	Total		139	0	3	0	8	0	—		0	0	150	0
Royal Excel Mouscron	2015–16	Pro League	6	0	—		—		—		—		6	0
Hibernian (loan)	2016–17	Scottish Championship	21	0	5	0	0	0	—		2 (Note: Appearances in Scottish Challenge Cup)	0	28	0
Hibernian	2017–18	Scottish Premiership	34	0	1	0	4	0	—		—		39	0
Hibernian	2018–19	Scottish Premiership	20	0	3	0	0	0	—		—		23	0
Hibernian	2019–20 (Note: One appearance in the 2019–20 Scottish Cup was in a match delayed until October 2020 due to the COVID-19 pandemic.)	Scottish Premiership	19	0	5	0	2	0	—		—		26	0
Hibernian	2020–21	Scottish Premiership	32	0	0	0	3	0	—		—		35	0
Hibernian	Total		105	0	9	0	9	0	—		0	0	123	0
Feyenoord	2021–22	Eredivisie	12	0	0	0	—		8 (Note: Appearances in UEFA Europa Conference League)	0	—		20	0
Feyenoord	2022–23	Eredivisie	0	0	0	0	—		0	0	—		0	0
Feyenoord	Total		12	0	0	0	—		8	0	0	0	20	0
Hapoel Be'er Sheva	2023–24	Israeli Premier League	0	0	0	0	—		0 (Note: Appearances in UEFA Europa Conference League)	0	—		0	0
Career total			282	0	17	0	17	0	8	0	2	0	326	0

=== International ===
Appearances and goals by national team and year
National team	Year	Apps	Goals
Israel	2014	3	0
Israel	2015	7	0
Israel	2017	1	0
Israel	2019	5	0
Israel	2020	7	0
Israel	2021	11	0
Israel	2022	5	0
Total		40	0

== Honours ==
Hibernian

- Scottish Championship: 2016–17

Feyenoord

- Eredivisie: 2022–23
- UEFA Europa Conference League runner-up: 2021–22

Hapoel Beer Sheva

- Israeli Premier League: 2025–26
- Israel State Cup: 2024–25
- Israel Super Cup: 2025

== See also ==
- List of Jewish footballers
- List of Jews in sports
