= Callum Crane =

Scottish footballer (born 1996)

Personal information
- Date of birth: 8 March 1996 (age 30)
- Place of birth: Edinburgh, Scotland
- Height: 1.75 m (5 ft 9 in)
- Position: Defender

Team information
- Current team: Stirling Albion
- Number: 30

Youth career
- 2006–2015: Hibernian

Senior career*
Years	Team	Apps	(Gls)
2015–2018	Hibernian	1	(0)
2015–2016	→ Berwick Rangers (loan)	20	(0)
2017–2018	→ Alloa Athletic (loan)	33	(3)
2018–2019	Livingston	0	(0)
2018–2019	→ Raith Rovers (loan)	24	(1)
2019–2023	Edinburgh City	98	(3)
2024–	Stirling Albion	67	(2)
- * Club domestic league appearances and goals as of 5 May 2026

Callum Crane (born 8 March 1996) is a Scottish footballer who plays as a defender for Scottish League Two club Stirling Albion. Crane has previously played for Hibernian, Berwick Rangers, Alloa Athletic, Livingston, Raith Rovers and Edinburgh City.

== Career ==
=== Hibernian ===
Started his youth football at AC Oxgangs, a local team playing at Colinton Mains Park. Crane progressed through the Hibernian academy and signed a contract with the club in January 2015 that was due to run until 2018. Crane moved on loan in November 2015 to Berwick Rangers, where he stayed for the rest of the 2015/16 season.

Crane appeared for the Hibs first team in a pre-season friendly against Birmingham City, then made his competitive debut in a Challenge Cup match with Highland League club Turriff United. He made his league debut for Hibs on 26 February 2017, appearing as a substitute in a 2–2 draw with Dunfermline Athletic.

Crane was loaned to Alloa Athletic in August 2017. Hibs announced in May 2018 that Crane would be released at the end of the 2017–18 season.

=== Livingston ===
Crane signed a two-year contract with Livingston in June 2018. On 28 September 2018, Crane joined Scottish League One side Raith Rovers on loan until mid January. The loan was extended until the end of the season.

=== Edinburgh City ===
Crane joined Edinburgh City in June 2019 after terminating his Livingston contract.

== Career statistics ==
As of 29 June 2019

Appearances and goals by club, season and competition
Club	Season	League			Scottish Cup		League Cup		Other		Total	
Club	Season	Division	Apps	Goals	Apps	Goals	Apps	Goals	Apps	Goals	Apps	Goals
Hibernian	2015–16	Scottish Championship	—		—		—		—		—	
Hibernian	2016–17	Scottish Championship	1	0	—		—		1 (Note: Appearances in the Scottish Challenge Cup)	0	2	0
Hibernian	2017–18	Scottish Premiership	—		—		—		—		—	
Hibernian	Total		1	0	—		—		1	0	2	0
Berwick Rangers (loan)	2015–16	Scottish League Two	20	0	—		—		—		20	0
Alloa Athletic (loan)	2017–18	Scottish League One	33	3	2	0	—		5 (Note: Appearances in the Championship play-offs)	1	40	4
Livingston	2018–19	Scottish Premiership	—		—		4	0	—		4	0
Raith Rovers (loan)	2018–19	Scottish League One	24	1	2	0	—		4 (Note: Appearances in the Championship play-offs)	0	30	1
Career total			78	4	4	0	4	0	10	1	96	5
