= Efe Ambrose =

Nigerian footballer (born 1988)

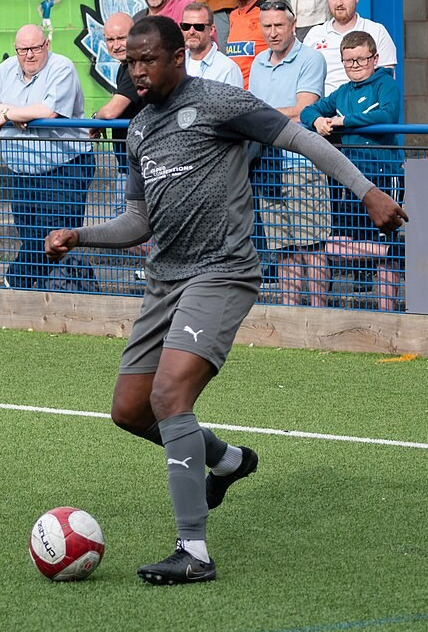

Personal information
- Full name: Efe Eric Ambrose
- Date of birth: 18 October 1988 (age 38)
- Place of birth: Kaduna, Nigeria
- Height: 1.90 m (6 ft 3 in)
- Position: Defender

Team information
- Current team: Port Glasgow

Youth career
- 2002–2006: Kaduna United

Senior career*
Years	Team	Apps	(Gls)
2006–2010	Kaduna United	89	(7)
2008–2009	→ Bayelsa United (loan)	24	(4)
2010–2012	Ashdod	67	(3)
2012–2017	Celtic	113	(5)
2017	→ Hibernian (loan)	10	(1)
2017–2019	Hibernian	59	(2)
2019	Derby County	0	(0)
2020–2021	Livingston	25	(0)
2021–2022	St Johnstone	7	(0)
2022	→ Dunfermline Athletic (loan)	12	(0)
2022–2023	Greenock Morton	11	(1)
2023–2024	Queen of the South	26	(0)
2024	Bury	7	(1)
2024–2025	Workington	30	(2)
2025	Glasgow United	5	(1)
2025–	Port Glasgow	0	(0)

International career
2007	Nigeria U20	4	(0)
2008	Nigeria U23	2	(0)
2008–2016	Nigeria	51	(4)
Medal record
Representing Nigeria
Africa Cup of Nations
Winner	2013
- * Club domestic league appearances and goals as of 20:15, 28 April 2025 (UTC)

Efe Eric Ambrose (born 18 October 1988) is a Nigerian professional footballer who plays as a defender for Port Glasgow. Ambrose has previously played for Kaduna United, Bayelsa United, Israeli club Ashdod, Scottish clubs Celtic, Hibernian, Livingston, St Johnstone and Dunfermline Athletic, Greenock Morton and English club Derby County.

Ambrose has also played for the Nigeria national football team, and he has represented Nigeria at the FIFA Under-20 World Cup, the Summer Olympics, the Africa Cup of Nations, and the FIFA World Cup.

== Club career ==
=== Early career ===
Ambrose started his professional career at Kaduna United in 2006 and two years later, he was loaned to Bayelsa United for the 2008–09 season but remained with Kaduna United after helping them win promotion.

=== FC Ashdod ===
Ambrose joined Israeli Premier League club FC Ashdod in June 2010 and left in 2012.

=== Celtic ===
Ambrose joined Scottish Premier League club Celtic on the summer 2012 transfer deadline day, signing a three-year contract. After joining the club, Ambrose praised his new teammates at Celtic for helping him settle down in Glasgow quickly. Ambrose also revealed he studied British football in order to join Celtic by watching both Scottish Premier League and English Premier League games on TV upon hearing about Celtic's interest in him.

Ambrose made his debut on 22 September 2012 as a substitute for Celtic captain Scott Brown against Dundee in the Scottish Premier League, a 2–0 victory. He made his full début against Raith Rovers in the Scottish League Cup, in a 4–1 victory. He scored his first goal for Celtic in a 5–0 win over St Mirren on 20 October 2012, celebrating the goal with a quadruple somersault. Ambrose went on to make his Champions League debut for Celtic, where he played 90 minutes in a 3–2 win over Spartak Moscow. On 4 November 2012, Ambrose headed in an own goal, in a 2–2 draw against Dundee United. After the match, Ambrose said he let himself down and felt that he could have cleared the ball away. On 7 November 2012, ahead of a Champions League game against Barcelona, Ambrose made a vow to give his best ever performance for the club. After a stunning performance by the Celtic players, they won 2–1 and Ambrose said that winning against Barcelona was the 'perfect way to celebrate Celtic's 125th anniversary.

At the end of the Champions League group stage campaign, Celtic qualified for the knock-out stages and faced the Italian side Juventus. In the first leg, Ambrose was named in the squad ahead of the match, only 3 days after Nigeria had won the Africa Cup of Nations, Ambrose had played the full 90 minutes in the final. However, Ambrose made several mistakes during the match, allowing Alessandro Matri (first goal) and Mirko Vučinić (third goal) to score with ease. He also missed the club's best chance to score late in the game. His performance was criticized by teammate Kris Commons. Though criticized, Ambrose was defended by Kelvin Wilson, who believed that Ambrose would bounce back from his disappointing performance. Ambrose made amends in the next league game when he scored Celtic's opener in a 6–2 win over Dundee United. Ambrose's (along with Commons) performance was praised by Neil Lennon. Three days later, he scored again, in a 1–1 draw against St Johnstone. Ahead of the second leg against Juventus, Ambrose said that Commons' criticism inspired him to become a better player. After the match, which Juventus won 2–0 and progressed to the quarter finals, Neil Lennon stated that Ambrose was late for training and missed the team bus from the hotel and was left to catch up by taxi. Lennon also stated that Ambrose needed to "sort himself out."

Ambrose came under strong criticism from fans and pundits alike for frequent poor performances and errors which led to opposition goals. On 31 August 2016, after becoming frozen out of the first-team at Celtic under new manager Brendan Rodgers, Celtic accepted a bid of £300,000 for Ambrose from Standard Liège, but the deal fell through after he opted to stay at Celtic Park. In February 2017, Ambrose's proposed loan move to Blackburn Rovers fell through, after the club was unable to obtain a work permit.

=== Hibernian ===
On 28 February 2017, Ambrose joined Hibernian on loan for the rest of the season. Ambrose scored his first goal for Hibs on 25 March, the opening goal of a 2–1 win in the Scottish Championship against Falkirk. He won the Scottish Championship player of the month award for March 2017.

After his contract with Celtic expired at the end of the season, Ambrose signed a two-year contract with Hibernian. Ambrose exercised a clause in his contract and left Hibernian in January 2019, despite the club offering him a new deal.

=== Derby County ===
In February 2019, Ambrose went on trial with EFL Championship club Derby County. Later that month he signed a short-term contract with the club.

He was released by Derby County at the end of the 2018–19 season.

=== Livingston ===
After several months without a club, Ambrose signed for Livingston in February 2020.

In May 2021, Ambrose was one of a few players who were released by Livingston at the end of the 2020–21 season.

=== St Johnstone ===
In September 2021, Ambrose signed with Scottish Premiership side St Johnstone.

==== Dunfermline ====
On 4 February 2022, Ambrose joined Scottish Championship side Dunfermline Athletic on loan until the end of the 2021–22 season.

=== Greenock Morton ===
Ambrose signed for Greenock Morton on 26 October 2022 in a deal until the end of the season. Ambrose would make his debut against Inverness Caledonian Thistle, notably being named man of the match after Morton's subsequent 4–0 victory. Ambrose also scored his first and only goal for Morton in a 2–1 home victory against Partick Thistle.

Ambrose made a total of 14 appearances for Morton in all competitions, before it was announced that he would be leaving the club upon the expiration of his contract.

=== Queen of the South ===
On 25 July 2023, Ambrose signed for Queen of the South until 31 December 2023.

=== Bury ===
On 8 June 2024, Ambrose joined North West Counties Football League Premier Division side Bury.

On 23 August 2024, Bury announced that Ambrose would be departing the club after their FA Vase fixture the following day. Having continued to live in Scotland, the commute to Bury no longer proved to be a viable option for Ambrose and his family.

=== Workington ===
On 26 August 2024, Ambrose joined Northern Premier League Premier Division club Workington.

=== Glasgow United ===
Ambrose signed for Glasgow United in July 2025.

== International career ==
Ambrose was a member of the Nigeria national under-20 football team at 2007 FIFA U-20 World Cup in Canada. He later represented Nigeria U-23 and played two games at the 2008 Summer Olympics.

He was called up to Nigeria's 23-man squad for the 2013 Africa Cup of Nations. In the Africa Cup of Nations, Ambrose played five out of six games for Nigeria, playing in the right-back position, including the final which he started. After the tournament, Ambrose was named in the 2013 African Cup of Nations Team of the Tournament. Ambrose says winning the Africa Cup of Nations was his biggest achievement and one of the greatest moments of his life.

He was selected for Nigeria's squad at the 2013 FIFA Confederations Cup and the 2014 FIFA World Cup. Ambrose has not been selected since 2016, due to him losing his place at Celtic. He played regularly for Hibernian during the 2017–18 season, but was not recalled for the 2018 FIFA World Cup squad. This decision was criticized by former Nigeria manager Samson Siasia, who felt that Ambrose's experience would have been useful.

== Style of play ==
Ambrose often played as a defensive midfielder for the Nigeria national football team and can also play as a centre back or right back, doing so in the Israeli Premier League at FC Ashdod. A ball playing centre-half, Efe is known for his composure in possession. He normally performs a somersault after scoring a goal.

== Career statistics ==
=== Club ===
As of 2 October 2021

Club	Season	League			National Cup		League Cup		Continental		Total	
Club	Season	Division	Apps	Goals	Apps	Goals	Apps	Goals	Apps	Goals	Apps	Goals
Ashdod	2010–11	Israeli Premier League	31	1	6	0	2	0	—		39	1
Ashdod	2011–12	Israeli Premier League	35	2	1	0	4	2	—		40	4
Ashdod	2012–13	Israeli Premier League	1	0	3	0	0	0	—		4	0
Ashdod	Total		67	3	10	0	6	2	—		83	5
Celtic	2012–13	Scottish Premier League	27	3	5	0	2	0	7 (Note: Appearances in UEFA Champions League)	0	41	3
Celtic	2013–14	Scottish Premiership	38	2	2	0	1	0	10	1	51	3
Celtic	2014–15	Scottish Premiership	27	0	3	0	2	0	11 (Note: Five appearances in UEFA Champions League, six appearances in UEFA Europa League)	0	43	0
Celtic	2015–16	Scottish Premiership	21	0	2	0	2	0	6 (Note: Three appearances in UEFA Champions League, three appearances in UEFA Europa League)	0	31	0
Celtic	2016–17	Scottish Premiership	0	0	0	0	0	0	2 (Note: Two appearances in UEFA Champions League)	0	2	0
Celtic	Total		113	5	12	0	7	0	36	1	168	6
Hibernian (loan)	2016–17	Scottish Championship	10	1	2	0	0	0	0	0	12	1
Hibernian	2017–18	Scottish Premiership	38	2	1	0	6	1	—		45	3
Hibernian	2018–19	Scottish Premiership	21	0	0	0	2	0	6 (Note: Appearances in UEFA Europa League)	2	29	2
Hibernian	Total		59	2	1	0	8	1	6	2	74	5
Derby County	2018–19	Championship	0	0	0	0	0	0	—		0	0
Livingston	2019–20	Scottish Premiership	3	0	0	0	0	0	—		3	0
Livingston	2020–21	Scottish Premiership	22	0	0	0	6	0	—		28	0
Livingston	Total		25	0	0	0	6	0	—		31	0
St Johnstone	2021–22	Scottish Premiership	3	0	0	0	1	0	0	0	4	0
Career total			274	11	25	0	27	3	42	3	368	17

=== International appearances ===
As of match played 29 March 2016

National team	Year	Apps	Goals
Nigeria	2008	1	0
Nigeria	2009	—	
Nigeria	2010	—	
Nigeria	2011	10	0
Nigeria	2012	5	1
Nigeria	2013	17	0
Nigeria	2014	13	1
Nigeria	2015	3	2
Nigeria	2016	2	0
Total		51	4

=== International goals ===
Scores and results list Nigeria's goal tally first.

#	Date	Venue	Opponent	Score	Result	Competition
1.	13 October 2012	U.J. Esuene Stadium, Calabar, Nigeria	Liberia	1–0	6–1	2013 Africa Cup of Nations qualification
2.	6 September 2014	U.J. Esuene Stadium, Calabar, Nigeria	Congo	1–0	2–3	2015 Africa Cup of Nations qualification
3.	11 October 2015	Edmond Machtens Stadium, Brussels, Belgium	Cameroon	1–0	3–0	Friendly
4.	17 November 2015	Adokiye Amiesimaka Stadium, Port Harcourt, Nigeria	Swaziland	2–0	2–0	2018 FIFA World Cup qualification

== Honours ==
Bayelsa

- Nigerian Premier League: 2008–09

Kaduna United

- Nigerian FA Cup: 2010

Celtic

- Scottish Premiership: 2012–13, 2013–14, 2014–15, 2015–16
- Scottish Cup: 2012–13
- Scottish League Cup: 2014–15

Hibernian

- Scottish Championship: 2016–17

Nigeria

- Africa Cup of Nations: 2013

Individual

- UEFA Champions League Team of the Week: (Week 3, 2012–13)
- Africa Cup of Nations Team of the Tournament: 2013

Orders

- Member of the Order of the Niger
