= 2017–18 Hibernian F.C. season =

Hibernian
2017–18 season
- Chairman: Rod Petrie
- Manager: Neil Lennon
- Stadium: Easter Road; Leith, Edinburgh, Scotland (Capacity: 20,421)
- Premiership: 4th
- Scottish Cup: Fourth round
- League Cup: Semi-finals
- Top goalscorer: League: Florian Kamberi (9); All: Simon Murray (14)
- Highest home attendance: 20,193; Hibernian v Celtic (10 December 2017)
- Lowest home attendance: 15,459; Hibernian v Motherwell (31 January 2018)
- Average home league attendance: 18,123
Home colours	Away colours	Third colours

The 2017–18 season was Hibernian's (Hibs) first season of play back in the top league of Scottish football the Scottish Premiership, having been promoted from the Scottish Championship at the end of the 2016–17 season. They last played in the Scottish Premiership during the 2013–14 season. Hibs reached the semi-final of the League Cup, where they lost 4–2 to holders Celtic. In the Scottish Cup, Hibs lost 1–0 to Edinburgh derby rivals Hearts in the fourth round (last 32). Hibs challenged for a second-place finish in the league, but eventually finished in fourth.

== Results and fixtures ==
Win Draw Loss Postponed

=== Friendlies ===
6 July 2017 Friendly	Dunfermline Athletic	0–4	Hibernian	East End Park
19:45		Report	Swanson 27'; Pennant 68'; Boyle 70'; Shaw 75'

9 July 2017 Testimonial match for Lewis Stevenson	Hibernian	2–2	Sunderland	Easter Road
14:00	Boyle; S. Murray 73'	Report	Khazri; Lens	Attendance: 9,309

11 July 2017 Friendly	Berwick Rangers	0–2	Hibernian	Shielfield Park
		Report	Handling 72'; Shaw 78'	Attendance: 1,206

=== Scottish Premiership ===
5 August 2017 1	Hibernian	3–1	Partick Thistle	Easter Road
15:00	Boyle 14'; Whittaker 33'; S. Murray 52' (pen.)	BBC Report	Erskine 7'	Attendance: 17,634; Referee: Walsh

12 August 2017 2	Rangers	2–3	Hibernian	Ibrox Stadium
15:00	Morelos 3'; Jack (red card) 36'; Tavernier 81'	BBC Report	S. Murray 21'; Tavernier 39' (o.g.); Slivka 65'	Attendance: 49,636; Referee: Beaton

19 August 2017 3	Hibernian	1–3	Hamilton Academical	Easter Road
15:00	Stokes 3'	BBC Report	Bingham 52' (pen.), 88'; Longridge 69'	Attendance: 16,633; Referee: McLean

27 August 2017 4	Dundee	1–1	Hibernian	Dens Park
12:30	Holt 9' (pen.)	BBC Report	Stokes 39'	Attendance: 6,004; Referee: Robertson

9 September 2017 5	St Johnstone	1–1	Hibernian	McDiarmid Park
15:00	O'Halloran 48'	BBC Report	Paton 61' (o.g.)	Attendance: 5,591; Referee: Walsh

16 September 2017 6	Hibernian	2–2	Motherwell	Easter Road
15:00	Stokes 21' (pen.), 57'	BBC Report	Moult 64', 74'	Attendance: 17,335; Referee: Cook

23 September 2017 7	Ross County	0–1	Hibernian	Victoria Park
15:00		BBC Report	Hanlon 13'	Attendance: 4,181; Referee: Dallas

30 September 2017 8	Celtic	2–2	Hibernian	Celtic Park
15:00	McGregor 15', 80'	BBC Report	McGinn 53', 77'	Attendance: 59,259; Referee: Collum

14 October 2017 9	Hibernian	0–1	Aberdeen	Easter Road
15:00		BBC Report	Mackay-Steven 38'	Attendance: 19,038; Referee: McLean

24 October 2017 10	Hibernian	1–0	Heart of Midlothian	Easter Road
19:45	S. Murray 3'	BBC Report		Attendance: 20,165; Referee: Dallas

28 October 2017 11	Motherwell	0–1	Hibernian	Fir Park
15:00		BBC Report	Boyle 27'	Attendance: 6,043; Referee: Madden

31 October 2017 12	Kilmarnock	0–3	Hibernian	Rugby Park
19:45		BBC Report	McGinn 10'; S. Murray 61'; Boyle 90+3'	Attendance: 5,005; Referee: Finnie

4 November 2017 13	Hibernian	2–1	Dundee	Easter Road
15:00	Boyle 2'; S. Murray 63'	BBC Report	Haber 21'	Attendance: 16,936; Referee: Beaton

18 November 2017 14	Hibernian	1–2	St Johnstone	Easter Road
	Stokes 90+1'	BBC Report	Davidson 74'; MacLean 90+3'	Attendance: 17,044; Referee: Thomson

25 November 2017 15	Hamilton Academical	1–1	Hibernian	New Douglas Park
	Rojano 72'	BBC Report	S. Murray 29'	Attendance: 2,945; Referee: Robertson

2 December 2017 16	Partick Thistle	0–1	Hibernian	Firhill Stadium
		BBC Report	Barton 48' (Own goal)	Attendance: 4,997; Referee: Thomson

10 December 2017 17	Hibernian	2–2	Celtic	Easter Road
	Ambrose 76'; Shaw 79'	BBC Report	Sinclair 59', 64'	Attendance: 20,193; Referee: Beaton

13 December 2017 18	Hibernian	1–2	Rangers	Easter Road
	Stevenson 9'	BBC Report	Windass 42'; Morelos 45'	Attendance: 20,057; Referee: Clancy

16 December 2017 19	Aberdeen	4–1	Hibernian	Pittodrie Stadium
	Shinnie 11'; Mackay-Steven 36', 45', 62'	BBC Report	Stokes 89'	Attendance: 14,923; Referee: Madden

23 December 2017 20	Hibernian	2–1	Ross County	Easter Road
	Stokes 21'; Shaw 75'	BBC Report	Curran 14'	Attendance: 16,228; Referee: Walsh

27 December 2017 21	Heart of Midlothian	0–0	Hibernian	Tynecastle Park
		BBC Report		Attendance: 19,316; Referee: McLean

30 December 2017 22	Hibernian	1–1	Kilmarnock	Easter Road
	Shaw 23'	BBC Report	Boyd 1'	Attendance: 17,666; Referee: Muir

24 January 2018 23	Dundee	0–1	Hibernian	Dens Park
		BBC Report	McGinn 52'	Attendance: 5,323; Referee: Robertson

27 January 2018 24	Celtic	1–0	Hibernian	Celtic Park
	Griffiths 27'	BBC Report		Attendance: 58,998; Referee: Madden

31 January 2018 25	Hibernian	2–1	Motherwell	Easter Road
	Kamberi 28'; Barker 47'	BBC Sport	Main 78'	Attendance: 15,459; Referee: Muir

3 February 2018 26	Rangers	1–2	Hibernian	Ibrox Stadium
	Goss 73'	BBC Sport	McGinn 41'; Maclaren 75' (pen.)	Attendance: 49,986; Referee: Collum

17 February 2018 27	Hibernian	2–0	Aberdeen	Easter Road
	Boyle 46'; Kamberi 60'	BBC Sport		Attendance: 19,551; Referee: Dallas

24 February 2018 28	Kilmarnock	2–2	Hibernian	Rugby Park
	Jones 58'; Boyd 61'	BBC Sport	Kamberi 1'; Porteous 9'	Attendance: 5,348; Referee: Clancy

9 March 2018 29	Hibernian	2–0	Heart of Midlothian	Easter Road
	Allan 59'; Maclaren 80'	BBC Sport		Attendance: 20,166; Referee: Madden

16 March 2018 30	St Johnstone	1–1	Hibernian	McDiarmid Park
	Kane 83'	BBC Report	Ambrose 2'; Marciano (red card) 14'	Attendance: 3,652; Referee: Beaton

31 March 2018 31	Hibernian	2–0	Partick Thistle	Easter Road
	Maclaren 71'; Hanlon 76'	BBC Sport	Devine (red card) 86'	Attendance: 17,497; Referee: Dallas

3 April 2018 32	Hibernian	3–1	Hamilton Academical	Easter Road
	Kamberi 17', 63', 85'	BBC Sport	Ogboe 9'; Imrie (red card) 62'	Attendance: 15,818; Referee: McLean

7 April 2018 33	Ross County	1–1	Hibernian	Victoria Park
	Mckay 28'	BBC Sport	Shaw 90'	Attendance: 5,389; Referee: Madden

21 April 2018 34	Hibernian	2–1	Celtic	Easter Road
	Maclaren 24'; Slivka 80'	BBC Sport; Celtic Report	Édouard 87'	Attendance: 19,886; Referee: Steven McLean

28 April 2018 35	Hibernian	5–3	Kilmarnock	Easter Road
	Allan 29'; Whittaker 54'; Maclaren 64'; Kamberi 76'; Barker 90+2'	BBC Sport	Boyd 33', 80'; Findlay 61'	Attendance: 17,470; Referee: Robertson

5 May 2018 36	Aberdeen	0–0	Hibernian	Pittodrie Stadium
		BBC Sport		Attendance: 17,822; Referee: Beaton

9 May 2018 37	Heart of Midlothian	2–1	Hibernian	Tynecastle Park
	Lafferty 26'; Naismith 57'	BBC Sport	Kamberi 48' (pen.)	Attendance: 19,324; Referee: Thomson

13 May 2018 38	Hibernian	5–5	Rangers	Easter Road
	Kamberi 10' (pen.); Allan 19'; Maclaren 22', 70', 90+3'	BBC Sport	Tavernier 25'; Rossiter 27'; Alves 40'; Holt 54'; Windass 68'	Attendance: 19,579; Referee: Dallas

=== Scottish Cup ===
21 January 2018 Fourth round	Heart of Midlothian	1–0	Hibernian	Tynecastle Park
14:05	Cowie 87'	BBC Report		Attendance: 18,709; Referee: Clancy

=== Scottish League Cup ===
==== Group stage ====
15 July 2017 1	Hibernian	4–0	Montrose	Easter Road
15:00	S Murray 12', 53'; F Murray 22'; Graham 88' (Penalty)	BBC Report		Attendance: 5,226; Referee: Dallas

21 July 2017 2	Ross County	0–0 (4 – 3 p)	Hibernian	Victoria Park
19:45		BBC Report; Sky Report		Attendance: 2,065; Referee: Steve McLean
	Penalties
	Routis (penalty missed); O'Brien (penalty scored); Schalk (penalty scored); Fraser (penalty scored); Gardyne (penalty scored)		Whittaker (penalty missed); McGinn (penalty scored); Boyle (penalty scored); F. Murray (penalty scored); Shaw (penalty missed)

25 July 2017 3	Hibernian	6–1	Arbroath	Easter Road
19:45	S. Murray 63', 51', 90+1'; Porteous 45', 88'; McGinn 53'	BBC Report	Doris 38'	Attendance: 4,856; Referee: Stephen Finnie

29 July 2017 4	Alloa Athletic	0–3	Hibernian	Recreation Park
15:00		BBC Report	F. Murray 15'; S. Murray 63', 80'	Attendance: 1,758; Referee: Collum

==== Knockout phase ====
8 August 2017 Second round	Hibernian	5–0	Ayr United	Easter Road
19:45	Stokes 20', 59'; S. Murray 31'; Ambrose 69'; Matulevičius 85'	BBC Report		Attendance: 8,135; Referee: Clancy

19 September 2017 Quarter-finals	Hibernian	3–2	Livingston	Easter Road
19:45	Swanson 18'; Boyle 32'; Stokes 83' (Penalty)	BBC Report	Lithgow 10'; De Vita 28'	Attendance: 8,535; Referee: Madden

21 October 2017 Semi-finals	Hibernian	2–4	Celtic	Hampden Park
	Stokes 59' (pen.); Shaw 70'	BBC Report	Lustig 15', 42'; Dembélé 66', 88'	Attendance: 39,813; Referee: Clancy

== Player statistics ==
During the 2017–18 season, Hibs have used twenty-nine different players in competitive games. The table below shows the number of appearances and goals scored by each player. David Gray is club captain for the season.

As of 31 March (UTC)

Number	Position	Nation	Name	Totals		Premiership		League Cup		Scottish Cup	
Number	Position	Nation	Name	Apps	Goals	Apps	Goals	Apps	Goals	Apps	Goals
1	GK	(Israel) ISR	Ofir Marciano	39	0	34+0	0	4+0	0	1+0	0
2	DF	(Scotland) SCO	David Gray	12	0	7+1	0	4+0	0	0+0	0
3	DF	(Scotland) SCO	Steven Whittaker	31	2	19+7	2	3+2	0	0+0	0
4	DF	(Scotland) SCO	Paul Hanlon	40	2	36+0	2	2+1	0	1+0	0
5	DF	(England) ENG	Liam Fontaine	2	0	0+0	0	2+0	0	0+0	0
6	DF	(Jamaica) JAM	Marvin Bartley	31	0	20+6	0	4+0	0	1+0	0
7	MF	(Scotland) SCO	John McGinn	43	6	35+0	5	7+0	1	1+0	0
8	MF	(Lithuania) LTU	Vykintas Slivka	27	2	9+13	2	2+2	0	1+0	0
9	FW	(Lithuania) LTU	Deivydas Matulevičius	14	1	0+12	0	0+2	1	0+0	0
10	MF	(Scotland) SCO	Dylan McGeouch	42	0	30+5	0	5+1	0	1+0	0
11	MF	(Scotland) SCO	Danny Swanson	22	1	4+13	0	4+1	1	0+0	0
14	DF	(Morocco) MAR	Faycal Rherras	1	0	0+1	0	0+0	0	0+0	0
15	FW	(Scotland) SCO	Simon Murray	28	14	17+5	6	5+0	8	0+1	0
16	DF	(Scotland) SCO	Lewis Stevenson	44	1	36+0	1	7+0	0	1+0	0
17	FW	(Scotland) SCO	Martin Boyle	43	6	34+0	5	5+3	1	1+0	0
19	FW	(Australia) AUS	Jamie Maclaren	15	8	11+4	8	0+0	0	0+0	0
20	MF	(England) ENG	Brandon Barker	30	2	17+10	2	1+1	0	0+1	0
21	GK	(Scotland) SCO	Ross Laidlaw	6	0	3+0	0	3+0	0	0+0	0
22	FW	(Switzerland) SUI	Florian Kamberi	14	9	14+0	9	0+0	0	0+0	0
23	MF	(Scotland) SCO	Scott Allan	12	3	12+0	3	0+0	0	0+0	0
24	DF	(Scotland) SCO	Darren McGregor	29	0	22+2	0	4+0	0	1+0	0
25	DF	(Nigeria) NGA	Efe Ambrose	45	3	37+1	2	6+0	1	1+0	0
26	MF	(Scotland) SCO	Scott Martin	2	0	0+0	0	0+2	0	0+0	0
28	FW	(Republic of Ireland) IRL	Anthony Stokes	21	11	15+3	7	3+0	4	0+0	0
29	FW	(Scotland) SCO	Brian Graham	2	1	0+0	0	0+2	1	0+0	0
31	GK	(Scotland) SCO	Cammy Bell	2	0	1+1	0	0+0	0	0+0	0
32	FW	(Scotland) SCO	Oli Shaw	21	5	5+11	4	0+4	1	1+0	0
33	MF	(Scotland) SCO	Fraser Murray	6	2	0+2	0	2+2	2	0+0	0
36	DF	(Scotland) SCO	Ryan Porteous	8	3	2+3	1	3+0	2	0+0	0

=== Disciplinary record ===
As of 31 March 2018

Number	Position	Nation	Name	Premiership		League Cup		Scottish Cup		Total	
Number	Position	Nation	Name	Booked	Sent off (straight red)	Booked	Sent off (straight red)	Booked	Sent off (straight red)	Booked	Sent off (straight red)
1	GK	(Israel)	Ofir Marciano	1	1	0	0	0	0	1	1
3	DF	(Scotland)	Steven Whittaker	2	0	0	0	0	0	2	0
4	DF	(Scotland)	Paul Hanlon	3	0	0	0	0	0	3	0
6	MF	(England)	Marvin Bartley	6	0	0	0	0	0	6	0
7	MF	(Scotland)	John McGinn	12	0	2	0	1	0	15	0
8	MF	(Lithuania)	Vykintas Slivka	2	0	1	0	0	0	3	0
10	MF	(Scotland)	Dylan McGeouch	3	0	0	0	0	0	3	0
11	MF	(Scotland)	Danny Swanson	0	0	2	0	0	0	2	0
15	DF	(Scotland)	Simon Murray	1	0	0	0	0	0	1	0
16	DF	(Scotland)	Lewis Stevenson	4	0	1	0	0	0	5	0
17	FW	(Scotland)	Martin Boyle	1	0	0	0	0	0	1	0
22	FW	(Switzerland)	Florian Kamberi	2	0	0	0	0	0	2	0
23	MF	(Scotland)	Scott Allan	2	0	0	0	0	0	2	0
24	DF	(Scotland)	Darren McGregor	1	0	0	0	0	0	1	0
25	DF	(Nigeria)	Efe Ambrose	4	0	0	0	0	0	4	0
28	FW	(Republic of Ireland)	Anthony Stokes	4	0	0	0	0	0	4	0
36	DF	(Scotland)	Ryan Porteous	4	0	0	0	0	0	4	0
Total				49	1	6	0	1	0	56	1

=== Goal Scorers ===
Last updated 31 March 2018

Place	Position	Nation	Name	Premiership	League Cup	Scottish Cup	Total
1	FW	(Scotland)	Simon Murray	6	8	0	14
2	FW	(Republic of Ireland)	Anthony Stokes	7	4	0	11
3	FW	(Scotland)	Martin Boyle	5	1	0	6
3	MF	(Scotland)	John McGinn	5	1	0	6
5	FW	(Scotland)	Oli Shaw	3	1	0	4
5	FW	(Switzerland)	Florian Kamberi	4	0	0	4
5	DF	(Scotland)	Ryan Porteous	2	2	0	4
8	DF	(Nigeria)	Efe Ambrose	2	1	0	3
8	FW	(Australia)	Jamie Maclaren	3	0	0	3
10	MF	(Scotland)	Fraser Murray	0	2	0	2
10	DF	(Scotland)	Paul Hanlon	2	0	0	2
12	MF	(Scotland)	Danny Swanson	0	1	0	1
12	FW	(Scotland)	Brian Graham	0	1	0	1
12	DF	(Scotland)	Steven Whittaker	1	0	0	1
12	FW	(Lithuania)	Deivydas Matulevičius	0	1	0	1
12	MF	(Lithuania)	Vykintas Slivka	1	0	0	1
12	DF	(Scotland)	Lewis Stevenson	1	0	0	1
12	MF	(England)	Brandon Barker	1	0	0	1
12	MF	(Scotland)	Scott Allan	1	0	0	1
Total				44	23	0	67

== Club statistics ==
=== League table ===
Pos	Team	Pld	W	D	L	GF	GA	GD	Pts	Qualification or relegation (Note: Teams play each other three times (33 matches) before the league is split into two groups (the top six and the bottom six).)
2	Aberdeen	38	22	7	9	56	37	+19	73	Qualification for the Europa League second qualifying round
3	Rangers	38	21	7	10	76	50	+26	70	Qualification for the Europa League first qualifying round
4	Hibernian	38	18	13	7	62	46	+16	67	Qualification for the Europa League first qualifying round
5	Kilmarnock	38	16	11	11	49	47	+2	59	
6	Heart of Midlothian	38	12	13	13	39	39	0	49	

Source: Soccerway BBC
Rules for classification: 1) Points; 2) Goal difference; 3) Goals scored; 4) Play-off (only if deciding champion, UEFA competitions qualification and second-stage group allocation).

=== Division summary ===
Round	1	2	3	4	5	6	7	8	9	10	11	12	13	14	15	16	17	18	19	20	21	22	23	24	25	26	27	28	29	30	31	32	33	34	35	36	37	38
Ground	H	A	H	A	A	H	A	A	H	H	A	A	H	H	A	A	H	H	A	H	A	H	A	A	H	A	H	A	H	A	H	H	A	H	H	A	A	H
Result	W	W	L	D	D	D	W	D	L	W	W	W	W	L	D	W	D	L	L	W	D	D	W	L	W	W	W	D	W	D	W	W	D	W	W	D	L	D
Position	2	3	5	6	6	6	4	6	6	5	5	3	3	3	3	3	4	4	4	4	4	4	4	4	4	4	4	4	4	4	4	4	4	4	4	4	4	4

Updated to match(es) played on 13 May 2018. Source:
A = Away; H = Home; W = Win; D = Draw; L = Loss

=== League Cup group table ===
Pos	Team	Pld	W	PW	PL	L	GF	GA	GD	Pts	Qualification	HIB	ROS	ARB	MON	ALO
1	Hibernian (Q)	4	3	0	1	0	13	1	+12	10	Qualification for the Second Round	—	—	6–1	4–0	—
2	Ross County (Q)	4	2	2	0	0	8	0	+8	10	Qualification for the Second Round	p0–0	—	—	—	2–0
3	Arbroath	4	1	1	1	1	6	7	−1	6		—	0–0p	—	4–0	—
4	Montrose	4	1	0	0	3	2	15	−13	3		—	0–6	—	—	2–1
5	Alloa Athletic	4	0	0	1	3	2	8	−6	1		0–3	—	1–1p	—	—

Rules for classification: 1) goal difference, 2) goals scored, 3) away goals scored, 4) matches won, 5) away matches won, 6) drawing of lots.
(Q) Qualified to the phase indicated

=== Management statistics ===
As of 18 September 2018

Name	From	To	P	W	D	L	Win% (Note: Win% is the percentage of matches won rounded to two decimal places.)
(Northern Ireland) Neil Lennon	15 July 2017	13 May 2018	46	23	14	9	50.00

== Transfers ==
=== Players in ===
Player	From	Fee
(Scotland) Danny Swanson	(Scotland) St Johnstone	Free
(Scotland) Simon Murray	(Scotland) Dundee United	Free
(Nigeria) Efe Ambrose	(Scotland) Celtic	Free
(Israel) Ofir Marciano	(Israel) Ashdod	Undisclosed
(Scotland) Steven Whittaker	(England) Norwich City	Free
(Lithuania) Deivydas Matulevičius	(Belgium) Royal Excel Mouscron	Free
(Lithuania) Vykintas Slivka	(Italy) Juventus	Undisclosed
(Republic of Ireland) Anthony Stokes	(England) Blackburn Rovers	Free
(Scotland) Cammy Bell	(Scotland) Kilmarnock	Free

=== Players out ===
Player	To	Fee
(Scotland) James Keatings	(Scotland) Dundee United	Free
(Scotland) Scott Gallacher	(Scotland) Dumbarton	Free
(Northern Ireland) Brian McLean	(Iceland) IBV	Free
(Scotland) Alex Harris	(Scotland) Falkirk	Free
(Jamaica) Chris Humphrey	(England) Bury	Free
(England) Grant Holt	(England) King's Lynn Town	Free
(England) Jamie Insall	(Wales) Connah's Quay Nomads	Free
(Scotland) Aaron Dunsmore	(Scotland) East Fife	Free
(Scotland) Ali Smith	(Scotland) Cowdenbeath	Free
(Australia) Jason Cummings	(England) Nottingham Forest	Undisclosed
(Scotland) Fraser Fyvie	(Scotland) Dundee United	Free
(Scotland) Jordon Forster	(England) Cheltenham Town	Undisclosed
(Scotland) Sam Stanton	(Scotland) Dundee United	Free
(Scotland) Danny Handling	(Scotland) Dumbarton	Free
(Republic of Ireland) Anthony Stokes	(Greece) Apollon Smyrnis	Free
(Lithuania) Deivydas Matulevičius	(Finland) KuPS	Free
(England) Liam Fontaine	(Scotland) Ross County	Free

=== Loans in ===
Player	From
(England) Brandon Barker	(England) Manchester City
(Scotland) Scott Bain	(Scotland) Dundee
(Australia) Jamie Maclaren	(Germany) SV Darmstadt 98
(Morocco) Faycal Rherras	(Belgium) KV Mechelen
(Switzerland) Florian Kamberi	(Switzerland) Grasshoppers
(Scotland) Scott Allan	(Scotland) Celtic

=== Loans out ===
Player	To
(Scotland) Kevin Waugh	(England) Berwick Rangers
(Scotland) Callum Donaldson	(England) Berwick Rangers
(Scotland) Sam Stanton	(Scotland) Dundee United
(Scotland) Scott Martin	(Scotland) Arbroath
(Scotland) Simon Murray	(Scotland) Dundee

== See also ==
- List of Hibernian F.C. seasons
