= Joe Porteus =

English footballer

Personal information
- Full name: Joseph Porteus
- Date of birth: 20 April 1925
- Place of birth: Shildon, County Durham, England
- Date of death: 9 January 1995 (aged 69)
- Place of death: Chesterfield, Derbyshire, England
- Position: Half-back

Senior career*
| Years | Team | Apps | (Gls) |
| | Chesterfield | 0 | (0) |
| 1946–1947 | York City | 23 | (0) |
| 1948– | Goole Town | | |
| Total | | 23 | (0) |
- * Club domestic league appearances and goals

Joseph Porteus (20 April 1925 – 9 January 1995) was an English professional footballer who played as a half-back in the Football League for York City, in non-League football for Goole Town and was on the books of Chesterfield without making a league appearance.
