= John Alexander Porteous =

Canadian journalist (1932–1995)

John Alexander Porteous (July 22, 1932 – May 10, 1995) was a noted Canadian columnist, journalist and broadcaster. Porteous was the voice of Miramichi pulp-cutter Ernie Freshet, a humorous character who appeared regularly on CBC Radio.

Born in Saint John, New Brunswick, he was one of two sons of John and Gladys (Trecartin) Porteous. He began his career in the recording industry. His work for Canadian independent label, Arc Records, included the signing of Anne Murray to her first record contract for her first recording on the album Singalong Jubilee Volume Three (1965), as Murray was then a participant on the CBC television musical/comedy show. Porteous also produced the album Echoes of the Atlantic (1963) on Maple Leaf Records for Newfoundland Country music artist, Dick Nolan (musician).

Returning to New Brunswick in 1974, he became known as a commentator for the CBC, published numerous articles and columns for such publications as The Globe and Mail, TV Guide and the Reader's Digest. He published a book of New Brunswick works of photography titled and three collections of humour. In 1980, he established a bursary for journalist students and aspiring writers, administered buy the former Atlantic Community Newspaper Association. In 2006, selections from They Choke Herring, Don't They? were included by author Will Ferguson in the Penguin Anthology of Canadian Humour.

He died in Moncton, New Brunswick.

== Publications ==
- New Brunswick Images (1977)
- They Choke Herring, Don't They? (1980)
- My Lobster is Double Parked (1981)
- Here's Your Chainsaw, What's Your Hurry? (1984)
