= Hugh Gordon Porteus =

Hugh Gordon Porteus (1906–1993) was an influential reviewer of art and literature in the London of the 1930s, and also a poet. He was an admirer of Wyndham Lewis and wrote the first critical book on him, published in 1932. Lewis portrayed Porteus as the character "Rotter" Parkinson in his novel Self Condemned.

== Life ==
He trained as an artist, and had a particular interest in Chinese art. He dressed in an affected way, and sometimes in imitation of Wyndham Lewis, and was considered somewhat eccentric; but he was an engaging and interesting conversationalist. He was also a gossip, and the reason why George Orwell attacked Lewis as a Stalinist in Partisan Review: Lewis had joked with Roy Campbell (another gossip) about writing a book on Stalin, Campbell had mentioned this to Porteus, and Porteus told this to Orwell as factual. A Lewis disciple, he was indiscreet about his teacher.

As literary editor of The Twentieth Century, monthly magazine of the Promethean Society in the early 1930s, he boosted the career of George Barker, about whom he wrote for Scrutiny. The Twentieth Century was published from March 1931 to May 1933, and printed poetry by W. H. Auden, Stephen Spender and Michael Roberts. Porteus published a review there of Wyndham Lewis's Hitler (1931), that was "unqualified praise". Lewis gave a public reading of his One Way Song in 1933 in Kensington Gardens, to an audience of Porteus and a flock of sheep.

He was also a long-time supporter and friend of Lawrence Durrell, whom he in 1946 compared to James Joyce and T. S. Eliot. He wrote in a hostile way about Laura Riding; and he compared John Middleton Murry in 1933 to "a renegade freelance vicar", in Time and Tide.

He wrote on Barbara Hepworth, Patrick Heron and John Piper, amongst others. He was included in the Cairo poets World War II group, having been stationed with the RAF on the Suez Canal (miserably seasick on the journey out). At the end of the war Ezra Pound, held prisoner, asked for Porteus to be given the work of checking the ideograms in the Pisan Cantos. Porteus wrote a 1950 essay Ezra Pound and His Chinese Character: A Radical Examination.

Jeffrey Meyers interviewed Porteus at length while researching his (1980) biography of Wyndham Lewis and published in 2016 a memoir of Porteus.

== Works ==
- Wyndham Lewis: A Discursive Exposition (1932)
- Background to Chinese Art (1935)
