= Ryan Porteous =

Scottish footballer (born 1999)

- Porteous with Los Angeles FC in 2026

Personal information
- Full name: Ryan Thomas Porteous
- Date of birth: 25 March 1999 (age 27)
- Place of birth: Dalkeith, Midlothian, Scotland
- Height: 6 ft 2 in (1.88 m)
- Position: Centre back

Team information
- Current team: Los Angeles FC
- Number: 5

Youth career
- Edina Hibs
- Aberdeen
- 2012–2016: Hibernian

Senior career*
Years	Team	Apps	(Gls)
2016–2023	Hibernian	120	(11)
2016–2017	→ Edinburgh City (loan)	23	(3)
2023–2025	Watford	76	(7)
2025	→ Preston North End (loan)	11	(1)
2025–	Los Angeles FC	39	(0)

International career^{‡}
2017–2018	Scotland U19	7	(0)
2018	Scotland U20	1	(0)
2018–2020	Scotland U21	14	(0)
2022–	Scotland	15	(1)
- * Club domestic league appearances and goals as of 10 November 2026 ‡ National team caps and goals as of 16 November 2026

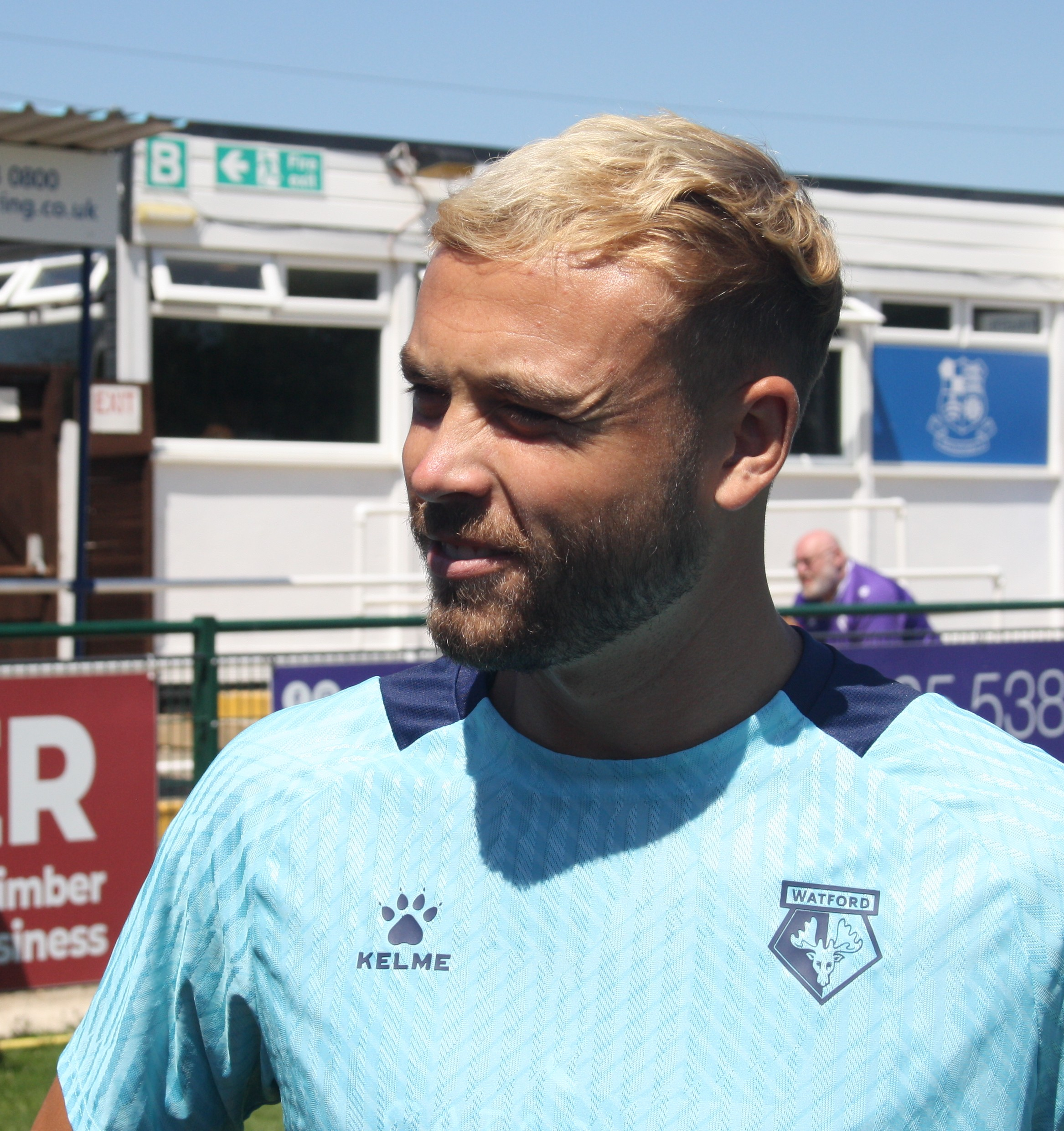
Ryan Porteous in 2025

Ryan Thomas Porteous (born 25 March 1999) is a Scottish professional footballer who plays as a centre-back for Major League Soccer club Los Angeles FC and the Scotland national team.

== Club career ==
=== Hibernian ===
Raised in Dalkeith in Midlothian, Porteous supported Hibernian in childhood and attended Dalkeith High School. He played youth football for Edinburgh club Edina Hibs and then Aberdeen before returning to Edinburgh to sign for his boyhood club. After establishing himself in the Hibernian youth system, he was loaned to Edinburgh City for the 2016–17 season and scored goals that secured wins against Annan Athletic (Edinburgh City's first in the SPFL) and Arbroath.

He made his first team debut for Hibernian in a 2017–18 Scottish League Cup group stage match against Montrose. He then scored two goals in his second appearance for Hibs, a 6–1 win against Arbroath in the same competition. Although becoming a regular in the senior squad during that season (30 times an unused substitute in addition to six Scottish Premiership matches in which he did feature), Porteous also continued to appear for the club's Under-20s, whose campaign ended with a 'double' of SPFL Development League and Scottish Youth Cup.

During October 2018, Porteous signed a new contract with Hibernian, which was due to run until the summer of 2023. He suffered a knee injury in January 2019 that required surgery, which prevented him from playing for the rest of the 2018–19 season.

On 20 December 2019, Porteous was shown a straight red card for a dangerous tackle on Rangers player Borna Barišić, with the incident provoking an angry confrontation between both coaching teams. Porteous suffered a serious knee injury during a Scottish Cup match at Dundee United in January 2020.

He returned from the injury ahead of the 2020–21 season, in which Hibs finished in third place and reached the 2021 Scottish Cup Final. Hibs turned down a bid of around £1 million from Millwall for Porteous in January 2021.

His 2021–22 season was disrupted by suspensions, as he was sent off twice and also banned retrospectively once. In the same week as his widely praised debut for the Scotland national team, Porteous scored his first goal of the 2022–23 season with the opener in a 2–0 victory at Ross County on 1 October 2022. Hibs announced in November that Porteous had turned down their offer of a new contract.

In January 2023, Porteous was subject of interest from Serie A side Udinese and EFL Championship side Blackburn Rovers. Hibs accepted an offer from Watford, another Championship club, of around £450,000.

=== Watford ===
On 27 January 2023, Porteous signed a contract with Watford which was due to run until the end of the 2026–27 season. He scored a goal during his first appearance for Watford, a 2–2 draw at Reading on 4 February.

==== Preston North End (loan) ====
On 3 February 2025, Porteous joined EFL Championship side Preston North End on loan until the end of the season.

=== Los Angeles FC ===
On 4 August 2025, Porteous signed for Major League Soccer side Los Angeles FC until the end of the 2028 season, with an option to extend until 2029. Los Angeles FC also had to pay Toronto FC $100,000 in Discovery Priority rights to complete the signing.

== International career ==
Porteous was named in the Scotland under-19 squad for the elite round of qualification for the 2017 UEFA European Under-19 Championship.

Selected for the Scotland under-21 squad in the 2018 Toulon Tournament, the team lost to Turkey in a penalty-out and finished fourth. After he made his debut at the tournament, he made 14 appearances in total over the following two years.

He earned a first senior Scotland call-up for Euro 2020 qualifiers against Cyprus and Kazakhstan in November 2019, but did not play in either fixture. He was added to squads in October 2020 and November 2021.

Porteous was recalled to the squad in September 2022 and, following injuries to Kieran Tierney and Scott McKenna, made his full international debut in a Nations League match with Ukraine. The team produced a solid defensive performance to record a goalless draw that secured first place in the group, thereby sealing promotion to the top level of the Nations League and a guaranteed play-off appearance in qualifying for UEFA Euro 2024. Porteous was singled out for praise by his teammates, manager and members of the media, with boss Steve Clarke describing his performance as "outstanding" and pundit Michael Stewart hailing a "debut to remember". Captain John McGinn, a former teammate at Hibernian, said "(Porteous) was first class. A 10-out-of-10 performance. If he keeps on performing like that there's no doubt he can be a Scotland regular for years to come."

He scored his first international goal on 8 September 2023, during a 3–0 win in a Euro 2024 qualifier against Cyprus.

On 7 June 2024, Porteous was named in Scotland's squad for the UEFA Euro 2024 finals in Germany. A week later, he started the opening match of the competition against Germany and was shown a red card in the 45th minute for a foul on İlkay Gündoğan. The foul also resulted in a penalty kick, which was scored by Kai Havertz to make the score 3–0 in an eventual 5–1 loss for the Scots. UEFA later announced that Porteous would be suspended for Scotland's remaining two group stage games for "serious rough play".

Porteous was recalled to the Scotland squad in November 2026.

== Personal life ==
His older sister Emma is also a footballer who played for Hibernian and was selected for Scotland at youth level before taking a university scholarship in Pennsylvania to combine her sporting and academic studies. Ryan missed her graduation to play for Scotland Under-21s.

As of 2018, Porteous was signed to an agency operated by tennis player Andy Murray.

In October 2020, Porteous declared his support for the Common Goal charity.

Porteous was fined by both a court and Hibernian in June 2022, after he pleaded guilty to a charge of culpable and reckless conduct for hitting a woman with a plastic tumbler.

== Career statistics ==
=== Club ===
As of match played 12 April 2025

Appearances and goals by club, season and competition
Club	Season	League			National cup (Note: Includes Scottish Cup, FA Cup)		League cup (Note: Includes Scottish League Cup, EFL Cup)		Other		Total	
Club	Season	Division	Apps	Goals	Apps	Goals	Apps	Goals	Apps	Goals	Apps	Goals
Hibernian	2017–18	Scottish Premiership	6	1	0	0	3	2	—		9	3
Hibernian	2018–19 (Note: Soccerbase did not record appearances made by Porteous against NSI Runavik on 19 July, Asteras Tripolis on 26 July and 2 August, and Molde on 9 August and 16 August 2018.)	Scottish Premiership	16	3	0	0	2	0	5 (Note: Appearances in UEFA Europa League)	0	23	3
Hibernian	2019–20 (Note: One appearance in the 2019–20 Scottish Cup was in a match delayed until October 2020 due to the COVID-19 pandemic)	Scottish Premiership	14	1	2	0	1	0	—		17	1
Hibernian	2020–21	Scottish Premiership	34	1	5	0	3	0	—		42	1
Hibernian	2021–22	Scottish Premiership	29	2	3	0	4	0	4 (Note: Appearances in UEFA Conference League)	0	40	2
Hibernian	2022–23	Scottish Premiership	21	3	1	0	4	0	—		26	3
Hibernian	Total		120	11	11	0	17	2	9	0	157	13
Edinburgh City (loan)	2016–17	Scottish League Two	23	3	1	0	0	0	0	0	24	3
Hibernian U20 (Note: Appearances for Hibs development squad in Scottish Challenge Cup against senior clubs)
Hibernian U20	2017–18	—	—		—		—		1	0	1	0
Hibernian U20	2019–20	—	—		—		—		1	1	1	1
Hibernian U20	Total		—		—		—		2	1	2	1
Watford	2022–23	Championship	17	2	0	0	0	0	—		17	2
Watford	2023–24	Championship	37	3	2	0	1	0	—		40	3
Watford	2024–25	Championship	22	2	1	0	2	0	—		25	2
Watford	Total		76	7	3	0	3	0	—		82	7
Preston North End (loan)	2024–25	Championship	11	1	0	0	—		—		11	1
Career total			230	22	15	0	20	2	11	1	276	25

=== International ===
As of 16 November 2026

Appearances and goals by national team and year
National team	Year	Apps	Goals
Scotland	2022	1	0
Scotland	2023	8	1
Scotland	2024	3	0
Scotland	2025	1	0
2026	2	0	
Total		15	1

Scores and results list Scotland's goal tally first, score column indicates score after each Porteous goal

List of international goals scored by Ryan Porteous
No.	Date	Venue	Opponent	Score	Result	Competition
1	8 September 2023	AEK Arena, Larnaca, Cyprus	Cyprus	2–0	3–0	UEFA Euro 2024 qualifying

== Honours ==
Individual

- CONCACAF Champions Cup Best XI: 2026
