= Johnny Porteous =

Scottish footballer

Personal information
- Full name: John Robertson Porteous
- Date of birth: 5 December 1921
- Place of birth: Motherwell, Scotland
- Date of death: 13 August 2007 (aged 85)
- Place of death: Plymouth, England
- Position: Wing half

Senior career*
| Years | Team | Apps | (Gls) |
| 1946–1948 | Motherwell | 0 | (0) |
| 1948–1949 | Alloa Athletic | 27 | (1) |
| 1949–1956 | Plymouth Argyle | 214 | (13) |
| 1956–1957 | Exeter City | 40 | (0) |
| – | Truro City | ? | (?) |
- * Club domestic league appearances and goals

John Robertson Porteous (5 December 1921 – 13 August 2007) was a Scottish footballer who played as a wing half.

He began his career as a footballer with Motherwell F.C., but did not make a league appearance before joining Alloa Athletic in 1948. A year later, he moved to England to play for Plymouth Argyle, under the management of fellow countryman Jimmy Rae. A versatile player, Porteous was instrumental in the team that won the Third Division South championship in the 1951–52 season, and remained a regular name in the side until 1955. After making 221 appearances in all competitions, scoring 13 goals, he joined Exeter City in 1956, before finishing his career in non-league football with Truro City.

== Honours ==
Plymouth Argyle

- Football League Third Division South: 1951–52
