= 2007–08 Dundee United F.C. season =

Dundee United
2007–08 season
- Chairman: Eddie Thompson
- Manager: Craig Levein
- Stadium: Tannadice Park
- SPL: Fifth place
- Scottish Cup: Fifth round
- League Cup: Runners-up
- Top goalscorer: League: Noel Hunt (13); All: Noel Hunt (18)
- Highest home attendance: 13,613 vs. Celtic, SPL, 22 May 2008
- Lowest home attendance: 3,114 vs. Ross County, League Cup, 29 August 2007
Home colours	Away colours

The 2006–07 season was the 99th year of football played by Dundee United, and covers the period from 1 July 2007 to 30 June 2008. Dundee United finished the season in fifth place with 52 points. Noel Hunt was the top scorer with 18 goals.

== Summary ==
The pre-season period began with two new permanent signings at the club, Polish goalkeeper Łukasz Załuska and Darren Dods having signed deals in June. Irishman Willo Flood also arrived from Cardiff City on a season-long loan deal. In July, former Ajax youngster Prince Buaben signed after a successful trial and was joined by a second Polish keeper, Grzegorz Szamotulski, in time for the league season. Englishman Jordan Robertson became the second long-term loan signing when he arrived from Sheffield United in late August.

A number of players who were out of contract left the club following the end of the 2006–07 season. Lee Mair signed a pre-contract deal with Aberdeen and Derek Stillie moved to England to pursue a law career. David McCracken and Collin Samuel were both released. Also leaving the club were a number of younger players who had failed to earn extensions to their contracts. These were Gregg Burnett, Barry Callaghan and Ross Gardiner. All had played at least once for the first team.

The first game of the season was home to Aberdeen in the SPL, and ended in a 1–0 victory. As the season progressed, United maintained their high league table position, ending 2007 in 4th place.

The club lost to Rangers in the League Cup final in March, losing on penalties. The Scottish Cup campaign was ended by St Mirren in the fifth round.

The club's playing kits were sponsored by Anglian Home Improvements for a second. The sponsor logo was displayed as a simple font across the chest, with white logo for the home top and black logo on the change strip. The shorts were again sponsored by Ole International after the Spanish property firm extended the deal for a second year. The shorts logo was displayed on the right hand side, above the club badge. The expiry of both deals at the end of the season means the club will have at least one new sponsorship for 2008–09, as the option of a third year of shirt sponsorship was passed for a new one-year deal with JD Sports' Carbrini Sportswear label for 2008–09.

=== Chronological list of events ===
This is a list of the significant events to occur at the club during the 2007–08 season, presented in chronological order. This list does not include transfers, which are listed in the transfers section below, or match results, which are in the results section.

- 26 July: Played a pre-season friendly against Barcelona, losing 1–0 to a last-minute Thierry Henry goal. Minutes earlier, Barry Robson had seen a legitimate header wrongly disallowed.
- 4 August: United win the opening league match of the season for the first time in eight years. It was only their second opening day win since the 1992–93 season.
- 6 September: Cameroonian striker Patrick Suffo arrives on trial.
- 18 September: French midfielder Morgaro Gomis signs a two-year contract extension.
- 8 November: Craig Levein picks up the Premier League Manager of the Month award for October.
- 10 November: Lee Wilkie follows manager Craig Levein by picking up the Premier League October Player of the Month award.
- 4 December: Gary Kirk leaves Raith Rovers to replaces Tony Docherty as club coach, after Docherty moved to St Johnstone.
- 28 December: Goalkeeper Grzegorz Szamotulski delays his departure and extends his contract by a month until the end of the transfer window.
- 29 December: Motherwell captain Phil O'Donnell collapses during the 5–3 win over United and is pronounced dead thirty minutes after the match.
- 7 January: United turn down a £175,000 bid from Blackpool for top scorer Noel Hunt.
- 18 January: Jordan Robertson is recalled from his loan spell by Sheffield United.
- 21 January: Manager Craig Levein's role is extended to include director of football.
- 23 January: United reject bids from Burnley and Nottm Forest for captain Barry Robson.
- 14 February: chairman Eddie Thompson appoints his son Stephen as chief executive.
- 21 March: The East Stand at Tannadice is renamed after chairman Eddie Thompson.
- 8 April: French striker Joël Thomas arrives for a ten-day trial
- 12 May: Referee Mike McCurry publicly admits that he got two decisions wrong in the match against Rangers, wrongly denying United both a penalty and goal.
- 16 May: Australian defender Scott Jamieson arrives for a fourteen-day trial
- 20 May: The club submit an official complaint to the SFA following Mike McCurry's handling of the match at Ibrox against Rangers
- 20 May: A second friendly is arranged against Barcelona with the 'rematch' scheduled for 26 July.
- 26 May: The club announce the possibility of taking legal action against George Peat after the SFA president branded manager Craig Levein's earlier comments "criminal".

== Fixtures and results ==
=== Scottish Premier League ===
4 August 2007	Dundee United	1–0	Aberdeen	Tannadice Park, Dundee
15.00	D Robertson 90'	Report		Attendance: 12,496; Referee: M Timulty

13 August 2007	Kilmarnock	2–1	Dundee United	Rugby Park, Kilmarnock
15.00	Gibson 79'; Nish 87'	Report	Hunt 50'	Attendance: 5,557; Referee: B Winter

18 August 2007	Dundee United	0–0	Hibernian	Tannadice, Dundee
15.00		Report		Attendance: 8,405; Referee: M McCurry

25 August 2007	Inverness CT	0–3	Dundee United	Caledonian Stadium, Inverness
15.00		Report	Dillon 47'; Robson 58' (pen.), 81' (pen.)	Attendance: 4,178; Referee: J Underhill

1 September 2007	Dundee United	2–0	Falkirk	Tannadice Park, Dundee
15.00	Hunt 58'; Robson 84'	Report		Attendance: 6,864; Referee: I Brines

16 September 2007	Dundee United	2–0	St Mirren	Tannadice Park, Dundee
15.00	Hunt 38'; J Robertson 68'	Report		Attendance: 6,128; Referee: S Dougal

22 September 2007	Gretna	3–2	Dundee United	Fir Park, Motherwell
15.00	Cowan 14', 36'; Jenkins 86'	Report	Buaben 9'; Wilkie 65'	Attendance: 1,624; Referee: C Richmond

29 September 2007	Celtic	3–0	Dundee United	Celtic Park, Glasgow
15.00	McDonald 7', 67', 72'	Report		Attendance: 57,006; Referee: D McDonald

6 October 2007	Dundee United	1–0	Motherwell	Tannadice Park, Dundee
15.00	Dods 78'	Report		Attendance: 6,286; Referee: S Finnie

20 October 2007	Heart of Midlothian	1–3	Dundee United	Tynecastle Park, Edinburgh
15.00	Kingston 90'	Report	J Robertson 14', 25'; Robson 89' (pen.)	Attendance: 16,661; Referee: C Thomson

28 October 2007	Dundee United	2–1	Rangers	Tannadice Park, Dundee
14.00	Wilkie 28'; Robson 54' (pen.)	Report	Cousin 51' (pen.)	Attendance: 12,129; Referee: D McDonald

3 November 2007	Aberdeen	2–0	Dundee United	Pittodrie Stadium, Aberdeen
15.00	Aluko 45'; Miller 90'	Report		Attendance: 16,661; Referee: C Thomson

10 November 2007	Dundee United	2–0	Kilmarnock	Tannadice Park, Dundee
14.00	Hunt 8'; Buaben 90'	Report		Attendance: 6,065; Referee: D Somers

24 November 2007	Hibernian	2–2	Dundee United	Easter Road, Edinburgh
15.00	Benjelloun 77'; Antoine-Curier 82'	Report	D Robertson 66', 74'	Attendance: 14,440; Referee: W Collum

1 December 2007	Dundee United	0–1	Inverness CT	Tannadice Park, Dundee
15.00		Report	Black 19'	Attendance: 5,845; Referee: I Brines

8 December 2007	Falkirk	3–0	Dundee United	Falkirk Stadium, Falkirk
15.00	Moutinho 5'; Barrett 41'; Higdon 66'	Report		Attendance: 4,803; Referee: M McCurry

15 December 2007	St Mirren	0–3	Dundee United	St Mirren Park, Paisley
15.00		Report	D Robertson 49'; Hunt 77'; Flood 90'	Attendance: 3,490; Referee: C Thomson

22 December 2007	Dundee United	1–2	Gretna	Tannadice Park, Dundee
15.00	Hunt 29'	Report	Deuchar 12'; Deverdics 42'	Attendance: 6,304; Referee: C Richmond

26 December 2007	Dundee United	0–2	Celtic	Tannadice Park, Dundee
15.00		Report	Vennegoor of Hesselink 68'; McManus 74'	Attendance: 12,357; Referee: E Smith

29 December 2007	Motherwell	5–3	Dundee United	Fir Park, Motherwell
15.00	Hughes 11'; Porter 14'; McCormack 17'; Clarkson 55', 56'	Report	D Robertson 36'; Hunt 75', 90'	Attendance: 5,227; Referee: C Allan

2 January 2008	Dundee United	4–1	Heart of Midlothian	Tannadice Park, Dundee
15.00	Robson 23', 70' (pen.), 88' (pen.); Hunt 84'	Report	Berra 37'	Attendance: 12,100; Referee: A Freeland

5 January 2008	Rangers	2–0	Dundee United	Ibrox Stadium, Glasgow
15.00	Naismith 9'; Ferguson 40'	Report		Attendance: 48,559; Referee: M McCurry

19 January 2008	Dundee United	3–0	Aberdeen	Tannadice Park, Dundee
15.00	Hunt 50'; Robson 77', 84'	Report		Attendance: 8,579; Referee: C Thomson

26 January 2008	Kilmarnock	1–2	Dundee United	Rugby Park, Kilmarnock
15.00	Wales 82'	Report	Robson 31'; Conway 66'	Attendance: 4,803; Referee: K Clark

9 February 2008	Dundee United	1–1	Hibernian	Tannadice Park, Dundee
15.00	Hunt 13' (pen.)	Report	Rankin 46'	Attendance: 6,635; Referee: E Smith

16 February 2008	Inverness CT	1–1	Dundee United	Caledonian Stadium, Inverness
15.00	Paatelainen 84'	Report	Buaben 68'	Attendance: 4,087; Referee: S Finnie

23 February 2008	Dundee United	0–0	Falkirk	Tannadice Park, Dundee
15.00		Report		Attendance: 6,835; Referee: M Timulty

27 February 2008	Dundee United	1–1	St Mirren	Tannadice Park, Dundee
19.45	Dillon 69'	Report	Dorman 88'	Attendance: 6,037; Referee: I Brines

6 March 2008	Gretna	0–3	Dundee United	Fir Park, Motherwell
19.45		Report	Kenneth 16'; Gomis 51'; D Robertson 64'	Attendance: 501; Referee: B Winter

12 March 2008	Celtic	0–0	Dundee United	Celtic Park, Glasgow
19.45		Report		Attendance: 45,000; Referee: M McCurry

22 March 2008	Dundee United	2–0	Motherwell	Tannadice Park, Dundee
12.30	Swanson 76'; De Vries 89'	Report		Attendance: 6,779; Referee: D McDonald

29 March 2008	Heart of Midlothian	1–0	Dundee United	Tynecastle Park, Edinburgh
15.00	Kingston 27'	Report		Attendance: 16,871; Referee: E Smith

6 April 2008	Dundee United	3–3	Rangers	Tannadice Park, Dundee
14.00	Kalvenes 37'; Hunt 51'; Cuéllar 65' (o.g.)	Report	Weir 44'; Novo 58'; Boyd 67'	Attendance: 11,214; Referee: C Richmond

20 April 2008	Dundee United	1–1	Hibernian	Tannadice Park, Dundee
14.00	Hunt 60' (pen.)	Report	Shiels 57'	Attendance: 7,404; Referee: E Smith

26 April 2008	Motherwell	2–2	Dundee United	Fir Park, Motherwell
12.30	Porter 17', 50'	Report	Craigan 45' (o.g.); Wilkie 86'	Attendance: 5,027; Referee: K Clark

3 May 2008	Aberdeen	2–1	Dundee United	Pittodrie Stadium, Aberdeen
15.00	Foster; Touzani 48'	Report	Swanson 49'	Attendance: 13,312; Referee: B Winter

10 May 2008	Rangers	3–1	Dundee United	Ibrox Stadium, Glasgow
12.30	Novo 7', 18'; Darchville 90'	Report	De Vries 76'	Attendance: 30,293; Referee: M McCurry

22 May 2008	Dundee United	0–1	Celtic	Tannadice Park, Dundee
19.45		Report	Vennegoor of Hesselink 72'	Attendance: 13,613; Referee: S Dougal

=== Scottish Cup ===
16 January 2008 Fourth round	Clyde	0–1	Dundee United	Broadwood Stadium
		Report	Robson 57'	Attendance: 1,550; Referee: C Richmond

2 February 2008 Fifth round	St Mirren	0–0	Dundee United	Love Street
		Report		Attendance: 3,945; Referee: M McCurry

13 February 2008 Fifth round replay	Dundee United	0–1	St Mirren	Tannadice Park
		Report	Dorman 48'	Attendance: 3,723; Referee: A Freeland

=== Scottish League Cup ===
29 August 2007 Second round	Dundee United	2–1	Ross County	Tannadice Park, Dundee
19:45	Hunt 65' (pen.); J Robertson 86'	Report	Barrowman 78'	Attendance: 3,114; Referee: C Allan

25 September 2007 Third round	Falkirk	0–1	Dundee United	Falkirk Stadium, Falkirk
19:45		Report	Wilkie 60'	Attendance: 2,804; Referee: C Thomson

31 October 2007 Quarter–finals	Dundee United	3–1	Hamilton Academical	Tannadice Park, Dundee
19:45	Hunt 10', 77', 85'	Report	Offiong 79' (pen.)	Attendance: 4,567; Referee: M McCurry

5 February 2008 Semi–finals	Aberdeen	1–4	Dundee United	Tynecastle Park, Edinburgh
19:45	Considine 19'	Report	Dods 23'; Kalvenes 60'; Conway 65'; Gomis 77'	Attendance: 12,046; Referee: I Brines

16 March 2008 Final	Dundee United	2–2 (a.e.t.) (2–3 p)	Rangers	Hampden Park, Glasgow
15:00	Hunt 34'; De Vries 96'	Report	Boyd 85', 113'	Attendance: 50,019; Referee: K Clark

== Player statistics ==
During the 2007–08 season, United used 30 different players on the pitch. The table below shows the number of appearances and goals scored by each player.

No.	Pos	Nat	Player	Total		SPL		Scottish Cup		League Cup	
No.	Pos	Nat	Player	Apps	Goals	Apps	Goals	Apps	Goals	Apps	Goals
1	GK	(Poland) POL	Łukasz Załuska	18	0	14	0	2	0	2	0
2	DF	(Republic of Ireland) IRL	Seán Dillon	39	2	32	2	3	0	4	0
3	DF	(Norway) NOR	Christian Kalvenes	23	2	18	1	1	0	4	1
4	DF	(Scotland) SCO	Lee Wilkie	37	4	30	3	3	0	4	1
5	DF	(Scotland) SCO	Darren Dods	39	2	32	1	3	0	4	1
6	MF	(Republic of Ireland) IRL	Willo Flood	43	0	35	0	3	0	5	0
7	MF	(Scotland) SCO	Mark Kerr	37	0	29	0	3	0	5	0
8	DF	(England) ENG	Danny Grainger	16	0	14	0	2	0	0	0
9	FW	(Republic of Ireland) IRL	Jon Daly	9	0	9	0	0	0	0	0
10	FW	(Republic of Ireland) IRL	Noel Hunt	43	18	35	13	3	0	5	5
11	MF	(Scotland) SCO	Barry Robson	24	12	21	11	1	1	2	0
11	MF	(Scotland) SCO	Jim O'Brien	10	0	10	0	0	0	0	0
12	MF	(Scotland) SCO	David Robertson	24	6	19	6	1	0	4	0
13	GK	(Scotland) SCO	Euan McLean	7	0	6	0	1	0	0	0
14	MF	(Scotland) SCO	Steven Robb	13	0	12	0	0	0	1	0
15	MF	(Scotland) SCO	Craig Conway	19	2	15	1	2	0	2	1
16	MF	(Senegal) SEN	Morgaro Gomis	43	1	35	1	3	0	5	0
17	MF	(Scotland) SCO	Greg Cameron	3	0	3	0	0	0	0	0
18	DF	(Scotland) SCO	Garry Kenneth	20	1	19	1	0	0	1	0
20	MF	(Ghana) GHA	Prince Buaben	29	2	23	2	1	0	5	0
21	GK	(Poland) POL	Grzegorz Szamotulski	21	0	18	0	0	0	3	0
22	FW	(England) ENG	Jordan Robertson	18	4	14	3	1	0	3	1
22	FW	(Suriname) SUR	Mark de Vries	17	3	13	2	2	0	2	1
23	MF	(Scotland) SCO	Danny Swanson	13	2	11	2	2	0	0	0
24	DF	(Scotland) SCO	Stuart Duff	9	0	9	0	0	0	0	0
24	DF	(Switzerland) SUI	Mihael Kovačević	5	0	4	0	0	0	1	0
25	FW	(England) ENG	Eric Odhiambo	4	0	4	0	0	0	0	0
26	FW	(Scotland) SCO	David Goodwillie	2	0	2	0	0	0	0	0
30	FW	(Scotland) SCO	Johnny Russell	2	0	2	0	0	0	0	0
32	MF	(Scotland) SCO	Fraser Milligan	1	0	1	0	0	0	0	0

=== Goalscorers ===
Fifteen players scored for the United first team with the team scoring 64 goals in total. The top goalscorer was Noel Hunt with 18 goals.

Name	League	Cups	Total
Noel Hunt	13	5	18
Barry Robson	11	1	12
David Robertson	6		6
Jordan Robertson	3	1	4
Lee Wilkie	3	1	4
Prince Buaben	3		3
Mark de Vries	2	1	3
Seán Dillon	2		2
Darren Dods	2		2
Danny Swanson	2		2
Craig Conway	1	1	2
Christian Kalvenes	1	1	2
Morgaro Gomis		2	2
Willo Flood	1		1
Garry Kenneth	1		1
Own goals	1		1

=== Discipline ===
During the 2007–08 season, nine United players were sent off and 15 received at least one caution. In total, the team received nine red cards and 56 yellow cards.

Name	Cautions	Dismissals
Lee Wilkie	(yellow card) 10	(red card) 1
Garry Kenneth	(yellow card) 5	(red card) 1
Morgaro Gomis	(yellow card) 4	(red card) 1
Willo Flood	(yellow card) 3	(red card) 1
Barry Robson	(yellow card) 3	(red card) 1
Jordan Robertson	(yellow card) 2	(red card) 1
Seán Dillon	(yellow card) 1	(red card) 1
Danny Swanson		(red card) 1
Grzegorz Szamotulski		(red card) 1
Darren Dods	(yellow card) 10	
Noel Hunt	(yellow card) 5	
Mark Kerr	(yellow card) 5	
Prince Buaben	(yellow card) 4	
Mark de Vries	(yellow card) 2	
David Robertson	(yellow card) 2	
Jon Daly	(yellow card) 1	
Danny Grainger	(yellow card) 1	
Christian Kalvenes	(yellow card) 1	
Jim O'Brien	(yellow card) 1	

== Competitions ==
=== League table ===
Pos	Team	Pld	W	D	L	GF	GA	GD	Pts	Qualification or relegation (Note: Teams played each other three times (33 matches), before the league split into two groups (the top six and the bottom six) for the last five matches.)
3	Motherwell	38	18	6	14	50	46	+4	60	Qualification for the UEFA Cup first round
4	Aberdeen	38	15	8	15	50	58	−8	53	
5	Dundee United	38	14	10	14	53	47	+6	52	
6	Hibernian	38	14	10	14	49	45	+4	52	Qualification for the Intertoto Cup second round (Note: Hibernian qualified for the Intertoto Cup as the highest ranked club to apply for a place in the competition.)
7	Falkirk	38	13	10	15	45	49	−4	49	

Source: Scottish Professional Football League
Rules for classification: 1) Points; 2) Goal difference; 3) Goals scored

== Transfers ==
=== In ===
Date	Player	From	Fee
11 June 2007	(Poland) Łukasz Załuska	(Poland) Korona Kielce	Nominal
22 June 2007	(Scotland) Darren Dods	(Scotland) Inverness CT	Free
20 July 2007	(Ghana) Prince Buaben	(Netherlands) Ajax	Free
25 July 2007	(Poland) Grzegorz Szamotulski	(Austria) Sturm Graz	Free
1 January 2008	(Scotland) Danny Swanson	(Scotland) Berwick Rangers	£40,000
1 January 2008	(England) Danny Grainger	(Scotland) Gretna	£15,000
18 January 2008	(Switzerland) Mihael Kovačević	(Slovenia) Koper	£40,000
25 January 2008	(Suriname) Mark de Vries	(England) Leicester City	Free
3 March 2008	(Guinea) Kémoko Camara	(South Africa) AmaZulu	Free
15 April 2008	(Scotland) Kevin Smith	(England) Sunderland	Free

=== Out ===
Date	Player	To	Fee
31 August 2007	(Scotland) David Proctor	(Scotland) Inverness CT	Free
3 January 2008	(Scotland) William Easton	(Scotland) Ayr United	Free
17 January 2008	(Scotland) Stuart Duff	(Scotland) Aberdeen	Free
31 January 2008	(Poland) Grzegorz Szamotulski	(England) Preston North End	Free
31 January 2008	(Scotland) Barry Robson	(Scotland) Celtic	£1,250,000
15 May 2008	(Scotland) Euan McLean	(Scotland) St Johnstone	Free
27 May 2008	(Scotland) Steven Robb	(Scotland) St Mirren	Free
30 June 2008	(Norway) Christian Kalvenes	(England) Burnley	Free
30 June 2008	(Scotland) Mark Kerr	(Scotland) Aberdeen	Free

=== Loans in ===
Date	Player	From	Fee
12 June 2007	(Republic of Ireland) Willo Flood	(Wales) Cardiff City	Loan
28 August 2007	(England) Jordan Robertson	(England) Sheffield United	Loan
1 January 2008	(England) Eric Odhiambo	(England) Leicester City	Loan
31 January 2008	(Republic of Ireland) Jim O'Brien	(Scotland) Celtic	Loan

=== Loans out ===
Date	Player	From	Fee
28 August 2007	(Scotland) Marco Andreoni	(Scotland) Montrose	Loan
28 August 2007	(Scotland) William Easton	(Scotland) Stirling Albion	Loan
26 October 2007	(Scotland) Greg Cameron	(Scotland) Partick Thistle	Loan
2 November 2007	(Scotland) David Goodwillie	(Scotland) Raith Rovers	Loan
2 January 2008	(Scotland) Marco Andreoni	(Scotland) Airdrie United	Loan
18 January 2008	(Scotland) Greg Cameron	(Scotland) St Johnstone	Loan

== Awards ==
- Scottish Premier League Manager of the Month: 1

Craig Levein (October 2007)

- Scottish Premier League Player of the Month: 2

Lee Wilkie (October 2007), Barry Robson (January 2008)

- Scottish Premier League Young Player of the Month: 2

Danny Grainger (January 2008), Garry Kenneth (March 2008)

- Scottish Premier League Goal of the Season: 1

Willo Flood (2007–08)
