= 2006–07 Dundee United F.C. season =

Dundee United
2006–07 season
- Chairman: Eddie Thompson
- Manager: Craig Brewster (until 29 October); Craig Levein (from 30 October)
- Stadium: Tannadice Park
- SPL: Ninth place
- Scottish Cup: Fourth round
- League Cup: Third round
- Top goalscorer: League: Barry Robson (11); All: Barry Robson (12)
- Highest home attendance: 12,329 vs. Aberdeen, SPL, 30 December 2006
- Lowest home attendance: 2,851 vs. Airdrie United, 22 August 2006
Home colours	Away colours

The 2006–07 season was the 98th year of football played by Dundee United, and covers the period from 1 July 2006 to 30 June 2007. United finished in ninth place for the third season in the row and meant they had only finished in the top six once in the seven seasons since the split was introduced.

United finished the season in ninth place with 42 points in the 2006–07 SPL season. In a poor end to the post-match split, United failed to win, scoring just one goal.

The League Cup campaign was ended by St Johnstone – aided by ex-United player Jason Scotland – who won 3–0 in the third round. United also exited the Scottish Cup at the second hurdle, losing 1–0 at Inverness CT in the 4th round.

Fans' favourite Craig Brewster left the manager's position in late-October, with former Heart of Midlothian and Leicester City manager Craig Levein taking up the post.

== Summary ==
Dundee United played a total of 42 competitive matches during the 2006–07 season, as well as five pre-season friendlies, making a total of nearly fifty games played. The team finished ninth in the Scottish Premier League.

In the cup competitions, United were knocked out of the Scottish Cup at the fourth round stage, losing 1–0 at Inverness CT. The club also exited early in the League Cup, losing 3–0 away to First Division side St Johnstone in the third round.

New manager Craig Levein would pick up the manager of the month award for November 2006 and March 2007 respectively.

Nine players were signed during the 2006–07 season, with a total (public) transfer cost of just under £100,000, although three transfers were undisclosed or nominal fees. No players were loaned out during the 2006–07 season, with twelve leaving the club permanently. The club received no transfer fees as all players were released.

The new playing kits were produced Hummel for the first time by and the jerseys were sponsored y Anglian Home Improvements (who also sponsored Motherwell in the same season). The kit shorts were sponsored by Ole International.

== Review and events ==
United signed Craig Conway, Noel Hunt and Steven Robb in pre-season, with Derek McInnes, Jim McIntyre and Grant Brebner departing on free transfers after being released by the club. United started pre-season with a 4–1 win at Raith Rovers before a week in Denmark with matches against Herfølge BK and FC Nordsjælland. Back in Scotland, United played Forfar at Station Park before the Evening Telegraph Challenge Cup resulted in a disappointing 1–0 defeat to rivals Dundee at Dens. The round of pre-season friendlies meant none were played at Tannadice.

United started the league campaign with a 2–1 loss to Falkirk at home on the opening day of the season and then drew at Rangers, despite being 2–0 ahead. Goals from new signings Noel Hunt and Christian Kalvenes had put United ahead but Rangers fought back to draw in Paul Le Guen's first home match as Rangers manager. David Proctor finally arrived from Inverness CT to end weeks of protracted negotiations. Successive 0–0 draws against Kilmarnock (where Lee Miller's only start was marred by an early sending-off) and Dunfermline were improved by an extra-time CIS Cup win over Airdrie United and a 3–1 win at newly promoted St Mirren, where captain Barry Robson's 100th United match was event-filled, with two goals and a sending-off. The transfer window brought no new faces but striker Lee Miller was surprisingly allowed to leave for Aberdeen on a free transfer, although it later transpired he had been disciplined days earlier for breaking club regulations. David Fernández and Paul Ritchie were also freed before the deadline, with Fernandez signing for Kilmarnock and Ritchie joining Cypriot side Omonia Nicosia.

United started September with a 3–0 defeat at home to Hibernian but their unbeaten away run continued in Inverness with a 0–0 draw against Caley Thistle. United crashed out of the CIS Cup with a 3–0 defeat away to St Johnstone, with ex-United player Jason Scotland scoring the first goal. Further woe followed with only a draw at home to bottom-placed Motherwell. Free agent Grant Smith was recruited in late September to provide goals from midfield.

October started with a 4–0 defeat to Hearts at Tynecastle and a 4–1 home defeat to Celtic, sending United to the bottom of the table. In-between these matches, former Dundee defender Lee Wilkie signed until the end of the season. a 3–1 defeat to Aberdeen at Pittodrie led Brewster to publicly admit his players were in danger of heading for the First Division and the following 5–1 defeat to Falkirk did little to change this viewpoint. The low point of the season represented Brewster's final attempt to turn things around, illustrated by handing debut starts to no fewer than four players. United lost all four games in October, conceding 16 goals in the process.

On 29 October, Brewster and assistant Malky Thomson left by "mutual agreement", with widely tipped Craig Levein appointed less than 24 hours later. Levein's first match, a televised Sunday affair at home to Rangers, was watched from the stand as he completed a touchline ban from his time at Raith; it made little difference, as United came from behind to win 2–1 and record their first home league win of the season. The following weekend, Levein matched Brewster's record of two league wins, doing so in just two matches with a 1–0 win over Kilmarnock (Noel Hunt scoring). Mark de Vries – who played under Levein at Hearts and Leicester City – made public his desire to play for United. Levein's third match in charge brought a disappointing late 2–1 defeat at Dunfermline but November finished with three home wins in a row with a 1–0 win over St Mirren. Three wins from four was enough to hand Levein a Manager of the Month award in his first month (something also achieved by Gordon Chisholm in April 2006 during his caretaker spell).

December started with a battling 2–1 defeat at Hibs but a fourth consecutive home win followed with a 3–1 victory over Inverness. In-between these games, Cowdenbeath midfielder Morgaro Gomis agreed a deal to join in the transfer window for a nominal fee. On 15 December, defenders Ross Gardiner and Lee Wilkie agreed one-month loan deals with Arbroath and Ross County respectively. United won 3–2 at Motherwell, despite having defender Christian Kalvenes sent off in the first half. A narrow 1–0 defeat to Hearts ended Levein's impressive home form but plaudits were gained again following a 2–2 draw away to Celtic, although for the second time this season, United threw away a two-goal lead away to the Old Firm. 2006 ended on a high with a 3–1 win over 2nd-placed Aberdeen.

If 2006 ended on a high, then 2007 could not have begun any worse – a second 5–1 defeat to Falkirk, this time at Tannadice. New signing Morgaro Gomis made a late debut with Irishman Jon Daly becoming Levein's next signing, the big target man arriving from Hartlepool United on 5 January. The following day, Levein confirmed Grant Smith's contract would not be renewed but Sean Dillon's move from Shelbourne was eventually completed, with the Irish full back arriving on 11 January. Prior to this, a flu epidemic had seen the Scottish Cup game against St Mirren postponed. The after-effects may have been present as United slumped to a 5–0 defeat at Ibrox, with Daly and Dillon both making debuts. Shortly afterwards, it was announced that Inverness captain Darren Dods had signed a pre-contract agreement to join in the summer, ending a lengthy pursuit for him that had been started by former manager Craig Brewster some months previously. The re-arranged cup match against St Mirren was full of excitement, with United throwing away a two-goal lead before David Robertson secured the win with an injury-time winner. United lost a third consecutive league match, going down 1–0 at Rugby Park, with David McCracken – who had earlier been told he would be leaving in the summer – absent. Shortly afterwards, Alan Archibald and David Proctor were also informed they were free to leave. January's final match resulted in a disappointing goalless draw at home to Dunfermline.

Alan Archibald left to rejoin Partick Thistle on deadline day, while Che Bunce – who had spent a few days at Tannadice on trial – opted to sign for Coventry City instead. United exited the Scottish Cup, losing 1–0 to Inverness. David Proctor became the second player to move with special FIFA dispensation to a third club of the season (after Javier Mascherano), moving on loan to Airdrie United. On the pitch, United finally picked up a league win in 2007, completing a fourth successive victory over St Mirren this season, courtesy of Barry Robson's strike. The following week saw another clean sheet with a 0–0 draw at home to Hibs, only for a last-minute goal to give Inverness a 1–0 win up north. Off the pitch, there was plenty of excitement with a rumoured summer friendly against Barcelona, although the excitement failed to materialise onto the pitch as United were held 1–1 at home to Motherwell. The following weekend, Craig Levein's return to Tynecastle brought much cheer with a resounding 4–0 win, including Barry Robson's first senior hat-trick. United closed out March with a credible 1–1 draw at home to Celtic, although Barry Robson's second red card of the season spoiled Jon Daly's first goal for the club.

April began in emphatic fashion, with a 4–2 win at Aberdeen which saw five goals in the opening seventeen minutes; Greg Cameron's first goals for United were enough to clinch victory. United entered the league split with an away match at Dunfermline and continued their winless streak that stretched back to 1997, losing 1–0. The following week, David Robertson's goal earned a 1–1 draw at home to Inverness, although it later transpired Jon Daly's knee injury was posterior cruciate ligament damage and would rule him out for several months. On the same day, United's proposed pre-season fixture with Barcelona was confirmed, before St Mirren eased their relegation worries with a 2–0 weekend win at Tannadice. The penultimate match of the season saw a third straight loss for United, going down 2–0 at Falkirk; earlier in the week, Derek Stillie confirmed he would leave the club at the end of the season to pursue an English law career. Collin Samuel was not far behind, although due to the club deciding not to offer a new contract. The Falkirk defeat also saw another début for a youngster with Johnny Russell making a late substitute appearance. The season finished with a 0–0 home draw against Motherwell. It was the final game for Derek Stillie, David McCracken, Lee Mair and Collin Samuel, who each started the match.

== Fixtures and results ==
All results are written with Dundee United's score first.

=== Scottish Premier League ===
Date	Opponent	Venue	Result	Attendance	Scorers
29 July 2006	Falkirk	H	1–2	6,616	Robson
5 August 2006	Rangers	A	2–2	50,394	Hunt, Kalvenes
12 August 2006	Kilmarnock	A	0–0	5,328	
19 August 2006	Dunfermline Athletic	H	0–0	6,171	
26 August 2006	St Mirren	A	3–1	4,902	Robson (2), Duff
10 September 2006	Hibernian	H	0–3	6,387	
16 September 2006	Inverness CT	A	0–0	3,586	
23 September 2006	Motherwell	H	1–1	5,036	Hunt
1 October 2006	Heart of Midlothian	A	0–4	16,849	
14 October 2006	Celtic	H	1–4	10,504	Hunt
21 October 2006	Aberdeen	A	1–3	10,747	Robson
28 October 2006	Falkirk	A	1–5	5,386	Samuel
5 November 2006	Rangers	H	2–1	10,392	Kenneth, Mair
11 November 2006	Kilmarnock	H	1–0	5,815	Hunt
18 November 2006	Dunfermline Athletic	A	1–2	6,129	Robson
26 November 2006	St Mirren	H	1–0	5,681	Hunt
2 December 2006	Hibernian	A	1–2	14,032	Own goal
9 December 2006	Inverness CT	H	3–1	5,294	Hunt (2), Robertson
16 December 2006	Motherwell	A	3–2	4,420	Samuel, McCracken, Hunt
23 December 2006	Heart of Midlothian	H	0–1	7,789	
26 December 2006	Celtic	A	2–2	57,343	Robertson, Samuel
30 December 2006	Aberdeen	H	3–1	12,329	Samuel (2), Barry Robson
1 January 2007	Falkirk	H	1–5	6,261	Barry Robson
13 January 2007	Rangers	A	0–5	50,276	
20 January 2007	Kilmarnock	A	0–1	4,732	
27 January 2007	Dunfermline Athletic	H	0–0	6,295	
10 February 2007	St Mirren	A	1–0	3,849	Robson
18 February 2007	Hibernian	H	0–0	6,453	
3 March 2007	Inverness CT	A	0–1	3,901	
10 March 2007	Motherwell	H	1–1	5,183	Robb
17 March 2007	Heart of Midlothian	A	4–0	17,172	Robson (3), Hunt
31 March 2007	Celtic	H	1–1	11,363	Daly
7 April 2007	Aberdeen	A	4–2	12,148	Daly, Hunt, Cameron (2)
21 April 2007	Dunfermline Athletic	A	0–1	5,131	
28 April 2007	Inverness CT	H	1–1	5,273	Robertson
5 May 2007	St Mirren	H	0–2	6,875	
12 May 2007	Falkirk	A	0–2	4,161	
19 May 2007	Motherwell	H	0–0	6,070	

=== Scottish Cup ===
Date	Opponent	Opponent	Venue	Result	Attendance	Scorers
16 January 2007	Third round	St Mirren	H	3–2	4,010	Robson, Kenneth, Robertson
3 February 2007	Fourth round	Inverness CT	H	0–1	3,402	

=== Scottish League Cup ===
Date	Round	Opponent	Venue	Result	Attendance	Scorers
22 August 2006	Second round	Airdrie United	H	1–0	2,851	Robertson
19 September 2006	Third round	St Johnstone	H	0–3	4,653	

== Player statistics ==
During the 2006–07 season, United used 29 different players, with a further three named as substitutes who did not make an appearance on the pitch. The table below shows the number of appearances and goals scored by each player.

No.	Pos	Nat	Player	Total		SPL		Scottish Cup		League Cup	
No.	Pos	Nat	Player	Apps	Goals	Apps	Goals	Apps	Goals	Apps	Goals
1	GK	(Scotland) SCO	Derek Stillie	41	0	37	0	2	0	2	0
2	DF	(Norway) NOR	Christian Kalvenes	32	1	29	1	1	0	2	0
3	DF	(Scotland) SCO	David McCracken	36	1	33	1	2	0	1	0
4	DF	(Scotland) SCO	Lee Wilkie	15	0	14	0	1	0	0	0
5	DF	(Scotland) SCO	Lee Mair	19	1	18	1	1	0	0	0
6	DF	(Scotland) SCO	Alan Archibald	19	0	16	0	1	0	2	0
7	MF	(Scotland) SCO	Mark Kerr	40	0	36	0	2	0	2	0
9	FW	(Republic of Ireland) IRL	Jon Daly	13	2	11	2	2	0	0	0
10	FW	(Republic of Ireland) IRL	Noel Hunt	31	10	28	10	1	0	2	0
11	MF	(Scotland) SCO	Barry Robson	33	12	29	11	2	1	2	0
12	DF	(Scotland) SCO	Stuart Duff	30	1	28	1	2	0	0	0
14	MF	(Scotland) SCO	Steven Robb	17	1	15	1	0	0	2	0
15	MF	(Scotland) SCO	Craig Conway	34	0	30	0	2	0	2	0
16	FW	(Scotland) SCO	Craig Brewster	4	0	3	0	0	0	1	0
16	DF	(Republic of Ireland) IRL	Seán Dillon	16	0	15	0	1	0	0	0
17	MF	(Scotland) SCO	Greg Cameron	27	2	25	2	0	0	2	0
18	DF	(Scotland) SCO	Garry Kenneth	13	2	11	1	1	1	1	0
20	FW	(Trinidad and Tobago) TTO	Collin Samuel	41	5	37	5	2	0	2	0
21	GK	(Scotland) SCO	Euan McLean	1	0	1	0	0	0	0	0
23	MF	(Scotland) SCO	William Easton	7	0	7	0	0	0	0	0
25	MF	(Scotland) SCO	David Robertson	30	5	26	3	2	1	2	1
26	FW	(Scotland) SCO	David Goodwillie	15	0	15	0	0	0	0	0
27	MF	(Scotland) SCO	Gregg Burnett	1	0	1	0	0	0	0	0
28	DF	(Scotland) SCO	David Proctor	14	0	12	0	0	0	2	0
29	MF	(Senegal) SEN	Morgaro Gomis	12	0	12	0	0	0	0	0
30	MF	(Scotland) SCO	Grant Smith	6	0	6	0	0	0	0	0
36	DF	(Scotland) SCO	Keith Watson	1	0	1	0	0	0	0	0
49	FW	(Scotland) SCO	Johnny Russell	2	0	2	0	0	0	0	0

=== Goalscorers ===
Twelve players scored for the United first team with the team scoring 44 goals in total. The top goalscorer was Barry Robson, who finished the season with 12 goals.

Name	League	Cups	Total
Barry Robson	11	1	12
Noel Hunt	10		10
David Robertson	3	2	5
Collin Samuel	5		5
Greg Cameron	2		2
Jon Daly	2		2
Garry Kenneth	1	1	2
Stuart Duff	1		1
Christian Kalvenes	1		1
David McCracken	1		1
Lee Mair	1		1
Steven Robb	1		1
Own goals	1		1

=== Discipline ===
During the 2006–07 season, five United players were sent off, and twenty players received at least one yellow card. In total, the team received seven dismissals and 70 cautions.

Name	Cautions	Dismissals
Barry Robson	(yellow card) 9	(red card) 2
Noel Hunt	(yellow card) 3	(red card) 2
Lee Wilkie	(yellow card) 7	(red card) 1
Christian Kalvenes	(yellow card) 5	(red card) 1
David Robertson	(yellow card) 5	(red card) 1
Mark Kerr	(yellow card) 8	
Jon Daly	(yellow card) 5	
Lee Mair	(yellow card) 5	
Stuart Duff	(yellow card) 4	
David McCracken	(yellow card) 3	
Collin Samuel	(yellow card) 3	
Alan Archibald	(yellow card) 2	
Morgaro Gomis	(yellow card) 2	
Garry Kenneth	(yellow card) 2	
David Proctor	(yellow card) 2	
Craig Brewster	(yellow card) 1	
Greg Cameron	(yellow card) 1	
Seán Dillon	(yellow card) 1	
Steven Robb	(yellow card) 1	
Grant Smith	(yellow card) 1	

== Team statistics ==
=== League table ===
Pos	Team	Pld	W	D	L	GF	GA	GD	Pts	Qualification or relegation (Note: Teams played each other three times (33 matches), before the league split into two groups (the top six and the bottom six) for the last five matches.)
7	Falkirk	38	15	5	18	49	47	+2	50	
8	Inverness Caledonian Thistle	38	11	13	14	42	48	−6	46	
9	Dundee United	38	10	12	16	40	59	−19	42	
10	Motherwell	38	10	8	20	41	61	−20	38	
11	St Mirren	38	8	12	18	31	51	−20	36	

Source: Scottish Professional Football League
Rules for classification: 1) Points; 2) Goal difference; 3) Goals scored

== Transfers ==
=== In ===
Date	Player	From	Fee
20 June 2006	(Scotland) Craig Conway	(Scotland) Ayr United	Undisclosed
20 June 2006	(Republic of Ireland) Noel Hunt	(Scotland) Dunfermline Athletic	£50,000
20 June 2006	(Scotland) Steven Robb	(Scotland) Dundee	Free
2 August 2006	(Norway) Christian Kalvenes	(Norway) SK Brann	Free
10 August 2006	(Scotland) David Proctor	(Scotland) Inverness CT	£35,000
10 October 2006	(Scotland) Lee Wilkie	(Scotland) Dundee	Free
1 January 2007	(Senegal) Morgaro Gomis	(Scotland) Cowdenbeath	£10,000
8 January 2007	(Republic of Ireland) Jon Daly	(England) Hartlepool United	Undisclosed
11 January 2007	(Republic of Ireland) Seán Dillon	(Republic of Ireland) Shelbourne	£13,500

Sean Dillon's fee was €20,000, which amounted to approximately £13,500 at the time of transfer

=== Out ===
Date	Player	To	Fee
18 August 2006	(Spain) David Fernández	(Scotland) Kilmarnock	Free
21 August 2006	(Scotland) Paul Ritchie	(Cyprus) AC Omonia	Free
31 August 2006	(Scotland) Lee Miller	(Scotland) Aberdeen	Free
29 October 2006	(Scotland) Craig Brewster	(Scotland) Aberdeen	Free
31 January 2007	(Scotland) Alan Archibald	(Scotland) Partick Thistle	Free
31 May 2007	(Scotland) Gregg Burnett	(Scotland) Linlithgow Rose	Free
31 May 2007	(Scotland) Barry Callaghan	(Scotland) Brechin City	Free
31 May 2007	(Scotland) Ross Gardiner	(Scotland) Montrose	Free
31 May 2007	(Scotland) Lee Mair	(Scotland) Aberdeen	Free
31 May 2007	(Scotland) David McCracken	(England) Wycombe Wanderers	Free
31 May 2007	(Trinidad and Tobago) Collin Samuel	(Canada) Toronto	Free
31 May 2007	(Scotland) Derek Stillie	(England) Gillingham	Free

== See also ==
- 2006–07 Scottish Premier League
- 2006–07 Scottish Cup
- 2006–07 Scottish League Cup
- 2006–07 in Scottish football
