= 2008–09 Dundee United F.C. season =

Dundee United
2008–09 season
- Chairman: Eddie Thompson (until 15 October); Stephen Thompson (from 21 November)
- Manager: Craig Levein
- Stadium: Tannadice Park
- SPL: Fifth place
- Scottish Cup: Fifth round
- League Cup: Semi-finals
- Top goalscorer: League: Francisco Sandaza (10); All: Francisco Sandaza (10)
- Highest home attendance: 14,077 vs. Rangers, SPL, 24 May 2009
- Lowest home attendance: 3,444 vs. Airdrie United, League Cup, 23 September 2008
Home colours	Away colours

The 2008–09 season covers the period from 1 July 2008 to 30 June 2009 and is the club's 100th season, having been founded as Dundee Hibernian in 1909.

== Summary ==
The pre-season period began with a number of new signings at the club. Dundee midfielder Scott Robertson was one of three players to agree pre-contract deals in June and he was followed by fellow player Paul Dixon shortly afterwards. Willo Flood returned on a second successive season-long loan and fellow Cardiff City player Warren Feeney followed on a similar deal, with Spanish striker Francisco Sandaza and Irish forward Roy O'Donovan (loan) the final signings.

A number of players who were out of contract left the club following the end of the 2007–08 season, including Christian Kalvenes who moved to Burnley, and Mark Kerr, who followed Lee Mair, Stuart Duff and Lee Miller in recent years by signing for New Firm rivals Aberdeen. Last season's top scorer Noel Hunt left in July to join his brother Stephen at English side Reading.

Chairman Eddie Thompson died of prostate cancer on 15 October.

The club began pre-season by winning the Keyline Cup in Oban on 12 July before embarking on a short trip to Dublin where they played two friendlies against local sides. Upon returning to Scotland, United beat Raith Rovers 4-0 and fellow Fife side Dunfermline Athletic 3-2 before a match against Barcelona for the second year running. The friendlies culminated in a win at Plymouth Argyle where United faced former Terror Paul Sturrock. United also sent sides to play in victories against Cowdenbeath, Arbroath, Forres Mechanics, Dundee North End and Blairgowrie. A final friendly was planned against Lochee United but was postponed due to heavy rain. In April, the club racked up an 8–0 win at Brora Rangers to mark the opening of the ground's new floodlights, with Andis Shala scoring a hat-trick.

United began the season with a televised match away to promoted Hamilton Academical, which – despite taking the lead – they lost 3–1. Subsequent 1–1 draws at home to Celtic – another televised match in which Francisco Sandaza scored his first goal – and away to Motherwell produced the first points of the season but a home defeat to Kilmarnock and narrow defeat away to Hibernian left United bottom of the league after five matches. United's third televised match of the season saw them pick up their first league win at Aberdeen and was the first of four successive league victories, preceding home triumphs against Hearts, Inverness CT and St Mirren. The run of victories saw first league goals for summer signings Scott Robertson and Roy O'Donovan, with three clean sheets for goalkeeper Lukasz Zaluska. The St Mirren match was played three weeks after the Inverness match following the death of chairman Eddie Thompson, which led to the match against Rangers being postponed. As the St Mirren match was the first match following the death of the chairman, prices were reduced to just £5, prompting over 11,000 fans to attend and pay their respects with a minute's silence. United failed to make it five consecutive league game wins when they drew 0–0 at Falkirk but kept their unbeaten run going with an exciting 3–3 draw against Rangers at Ibrox and got back to winning ways with home wins over Aberdeen and Hibernian. A second successive 2–0 defeat to Kilmarnock – this time away from home – preceded a 1–1 draw at home to Hamilton, before wins at St Mirren and Inverness brought United back-to-back away victories for the first time since April 2007. United were involved in another high scoring match against Rangers in a 2–2 draw at Tannadice and followed it up by holding Hearts to a 0–0 draw at Tynecastle, closing 2008 with a home win against Falkirk.

2009 began with a draw at Celtic Park, despite being two goals behind but United's next match saw a 4–0 home collapse against Motherwell, only the club's second defeat in the previous 17 league matches. An exciting 3–2 win at home to St Mirren preceded a 2–0 defeat against Rangers at Ibrox, before draws at home to Inverness and away to Aberdeen. Rivals for third place Hearts won at Tannadice before United won away at Falkirk, with a defeat at Motherwell tempered by a home draw against Celtic. After conceding first at home for the seventh time in eight matches, United came from two goals down to draw with Hibernian, before beating Hamilton for the first time this season, securing a top six league finish. In the final match before the league split, United failed to gain further ground on Hearts for third place, being held at home by Kilmarnock to a goalless draw, ensuring United failed to score against the Ayrshire side all season. In the first match after the split, United's dominance of the entire match earned a win against Hibernian at Easter Road, before missing the chance to go third after a home draw against Aberdeen. United's final trip to Glasgow resulted in a narrow 2–1 loss against Celtic, with defeats against Heart of Midlothian and Rangers to close the season.

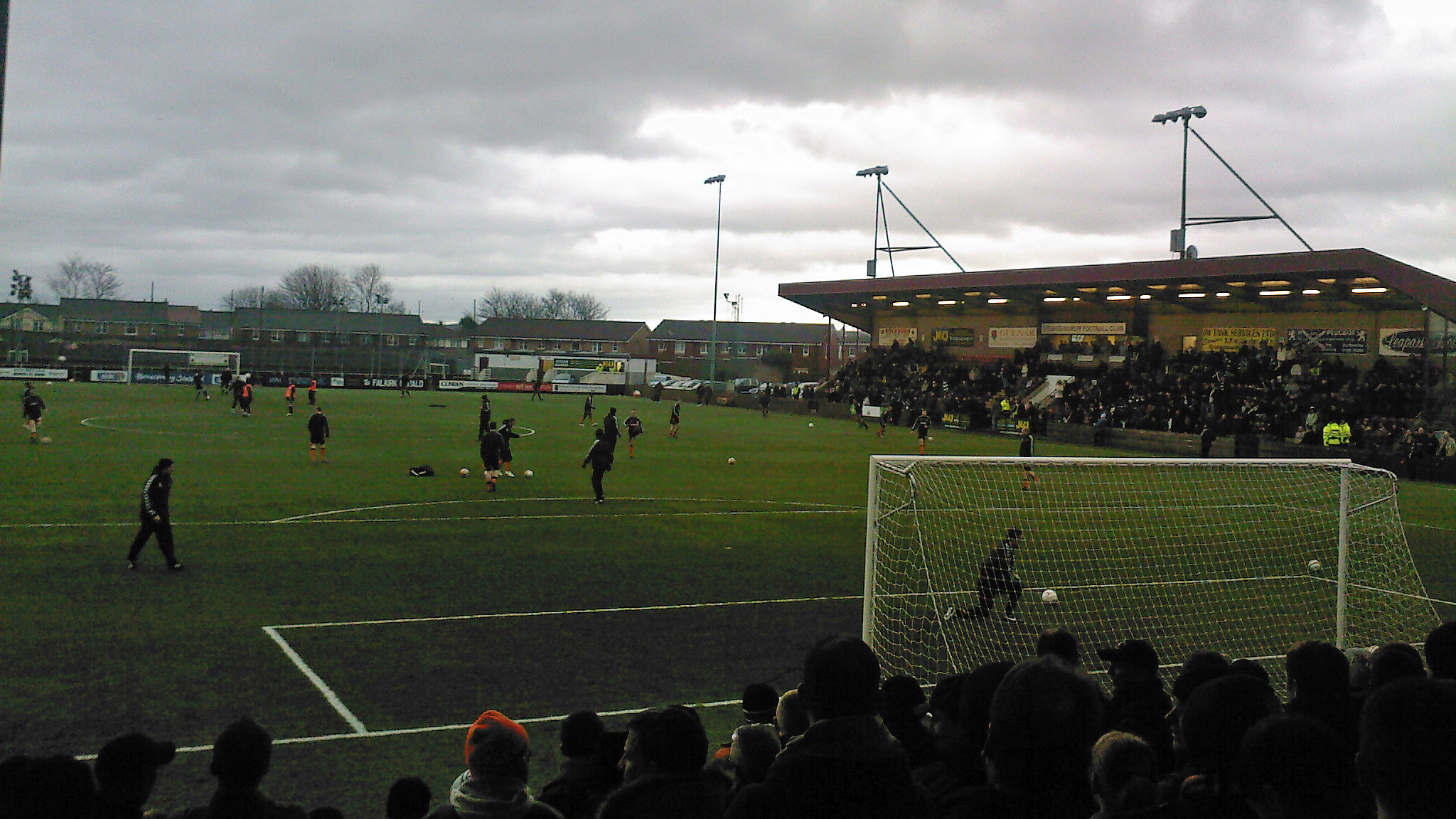
United players warming up before the cup match against East Stirlingshire

United beat East Stirlingshire 4–0 at Ochilview Park in the Scottish Cup fourth round, with goals from Prince Buaben, Darren Dods, Jon Daly and Johnny Russell. Shortly before the match, United were drawn away to Hamilton Academical in the fifth round, where they were narrowly beaten 2–1, despite leading at half-time.

Last season's runners-up United began their League Cup campaign away to Cowdenbeath, where a hat-trick from Jon Daly helped them to a 5–1 win. In the third round, Airdrie United – who United faced in the second round of last year's competition – were beaten 2–0, before a quarter-final win at home to Dunfermline Athletic. United faced Celtic in the semi-finals in late January where they lost11-10 on penalties, a record for a Scottish cup match.

United signed eleven players during the season. Midfielder Scott Robertson agreed a pre-contract move from rivals Dundee on 3 June and two players agreed similar moves on 17 June, with Northern Irish goalkeeper Michael McGovern agreeing to move from Celtic and German striker Andis Shala arriving from VfR Mannheim. Less than a week later, United signed a second player from Dundee when Scotland under-21 defender Paul Dixon arrived for around £25,000. Willo Flood returned for a second successive season-long loan when terms were agreed with Cardiff City again on 1 July and Cardiff colleague Warren Feeney followed in a similar deal a week later. Shortly afterwards, Spanish striker Francisco Sandaza arrived on a three-year contract from Valencia Mestalla. In August, Craig Levein's pursuit of Roy O'Donovan ended with a season-long deal for the Sunderland striker, although he was recalled in January, as was Willo Flood, ahead of his transfer to Celtic. On transfer deadline day, Paul Caddis moved from Celtic Park until the end of the season, with Australian midfielder James Wesolowski joining on a similar deal from Leicester City although his spell was cut short by injury. Youngster Jennison Myrie-Williams joined in June following his release from Bristol City.

The club sold only one player during the season, with Noel Hunt joining his brother Stephen at English side Reading for around £600,000. Young striker Kevin Smith moved on loan to Raith Rovers until January, with fellow youngsters Johnny Russell and John Gibson moving to Forfar Athletic on similar temporary deals. Young left back Sean Fleming followed suit shortly afterwards when he joined Peterhead for four months. Gibson's loan was subsequently extended until the end of the season, with young first team squad member Keith Watson joining him on a short-term loan, shortly afterwards Marco Andreoni undertook a similar deal with Albion Rovers. Sean Fleming moved back out on loan, joining Andreoni at Albion while young midfielder Ryan McCord moved short-term to Stirling Albion and Gordon Pope headed to Montrose. Kevin Smith went back to Raith after returning to Tannadice for a few weeks, with Johnny Russell returning to Forfar in similar fashion. Towards the end of February, midfielder Greg Cameron moved on loan to Irish outfit Shamrock Rovers, managed by former United player Michael O'Neill and Fraser Milligan departed to Montrose on a similar deal shortly afterwards. Youth goalkeeper Gibson signed a one-year deal with Dundee on his return to Tannadice. Similarly, Fleming, Pope and Milligan all penned two-year deals with Montrose at the end of May.

The club's playing kits were sponsored by JD Sports' Carbrini Sportswear label for the first time, with the firm also sponsoring the shorts. Kitmaker Hummel supplied their last strip after the club announced in March 2009 that Nike would begin a four-year deal for the 2009–10 season.

=== Chronological list of events ===
This is a list of the significant events to occur at the club during the 2008–09 season, presented in chronological order. This list does not include transfers, which are listed in the transfers section below, or match results, which are in the results section.

- 22 July: The club reject a £500,000 bid from Reading for striker Noel Hunt.
- 23 July: Reading's increased offer for Hunt – thought to be about £600,000 – is considered.
- 28 July: Former United player and manager Paul Sturrock announces he has Parkinson's disease, just days before United face his club Plymouth Argyle in a friendly.
- 28 August: United reject an approach from former manager Craig Brewster – now at Inverness CT – for Darren Dods.
- 31 August: Former United player Jamie Dolan dies of a heart attack whilst out jogging.
- 4 September: Garry Kenneth scores in Scotland under-21s 3–1 win against Slovenia. David Robertson also appeared as a late substitute.
- 6 September: Winger Craig Conway extends his contract until 2011.
- 9 September: Garry Kenneth's eighth Scotland under-21 cap ends in disappointment as defeat in Denmark ends their hopes of qualifying for the 2009 European Championship.
- 10 September: Director John Bennett resigns from the board with immediate effect.
- 20 September: Defender Mihael Kovačević suffers a fractured cheekbone during the closing stages of the 1–0 win at Aberdeen.
- 15 October: Chairman Eddie Thompson dies after losing his battle with prostate cancer. The match against Rangers, scheduled for three days later, is postponed as a mark of respect.
- 20 October: The club announce admission for the upcoming match against St Mirren will be only £5 to allow as many as possible to pay their respects to late chairman Eddie Thompson.
- 22 October: The funeral of late chairman Eddie Thompson is held in Broughty Ferry with around 1,000 supporters attending.
- 3 November: Rangers chairman David Murray apologises after suggesting abuse between some United and Dundee fans on certain websites was "just as bad" as between Celtic and Rangers.
- 5 November: Young striker Ryan Dow is named the SPL 'Rising Star' for September.
- 14 November: Stephen Thompson, son of late chairman Eddie, is officially named as the club's new chairman.
- 15 November: Scott Robertson is named in the Scotland squad to play Argentina, being called up as a late replacement due to injuries.
- 18 November: David Goodwillie makes his Scotland under-21 debut as a half-time substitute in the friendly defeat to Northern Ireland.
- 19 November: Robertson becomes the 19th United player to be capped by Scotland, appearing as a 59th-minute substitute for Barry Ferguson.
- 28 November: Manager Craig Levein turns down an approach from Football League Championship side Watford.
- 2 December: Levein signs a new contract until May 2012, with coaches Peter Houston and Gary Kirk following suit.
- 18 December: Lukasz Zaluska announces he will leave the club at the end of his contract, expecting to join Celtic.
- 8 January: Captain Lee Wilkie signs a new three-year contract.
- 12 January: Full-back Seán Dillon joins Wilkie in signing a new three-year contract.
- 17 January: The contract renewals keep on coming with Garry Kenneth and David Goodwillie signing until May 2012, and David Robertson and Kevin Smith signing until May 2011.
- 22 January: The seventh, eighth and ninth contract extensions this year are announced, with new deals for Darren Dods, Prince Buaben and Morgaro Gomis.
- 12 March: The club announce Nike will be the official kit supplier for the next four seasons from 2009–10 onwards.
- 11 April: United's 1–0 victory at Hamilton Academical secures a top-six finish for the second successive season.
- 18 April: Striker Kevin Smith suffers a broken leg and dislocated ankle while on loan at Raith Rovers, ruling him out for six months.

== Results and fixtures ==
Dundee United have played a total of 44 competitive matches during the 2008–09 season, as well as six first team pre-season friendlies. The team finished fifth in the Scottish Premier League.

In the cup competitions, United lost to Celtic in the League Cup semi-final, while they were beaten by Hamilton Academical in the Scottish Cup fifth round.

=== Friendlies ===
14 July 2008 Friendly	(Republic of Ireland) UCD	2–1	Dundee United	UCD Bowl
	McNally 54' (pen.); King 77'		Hunt 35'	Attendance: 500; Referee: D Coombes

16 July 2008 Friendly	(Republic of Ireland) Tolka Rovers	2–3	Dundee United	Frank Cooke Park
	Kelly 2'; Connor 33'		Wilkie 11', 83'; Hunt 85'

19 July 2008 Friendly	Raith Rovers	0–4	Dundee United	Stark's Park
			Feeney 8', 14', 60' (pen.); Hunt 70'

22 July 2008 Friendly	Dunfermline Athletic	2–3	Dundee United	East End Park
	Thomson 58'; Phinn 67'		Sandaza 60', 63'; Robertson 86'	Referee: S Finnie

26 July 2008 Friendly	Dundee United	1–5	(Spain) Barcelona	Tannadice Park
	Buaben 25'		Henry 26'; Messi 55', 76', 78'; Eto'o 61'	Attendance: 12,000

2 August 2008 Friendly	(England) Plymouth Argyle	0–1	Dundee United	Home Park
			Sandaza 47'	Attendance: 4,120; Referee: S Tanner

21 April 2009 Friendly	Brora Rangers	0–8	Dundee United	Dudgeon Park
			McCord 5'; Shala 7', 31', 77'; Swanson 13'; Dillon 16'; Goodwillie 54', 83'

=== Scottish Premier League ===
11 August 2008 1	Hamilton Academical	3–1	Dundee United	New Douglas Park
	Stevenson 29'; McArthur 39'; Graham 63'		McLaughlin 23' (o.g.)	Attendance: 4,385; Referee: S Dougal

17 August 2008 2	Dundee United	1–1	Celtic	Tannadice Park
	Sandaza 80'		Hartley 51'	Attendance: 11,648; Referee: C Richmond

23 August 2008 3	Motherwell	1–1	Dundee United	Fir Park
	Sutton 34'		Wilkie 40'	Attendance: 5,149; Referee: D McDonald

30 August 2008 4	Dundee United	0–2	Kilmarnock	Tannadice Park
			Skelton 40'; Invincible 59'	Attendance: 6,823; Referee: M Tumilty

13 September 2008 5	Hibernian	2–1	Dundee United	Easter Road
	Fletcher 22', 63'; Bamba (yellow card) 68' (red card)		Wilkie 45'	Attendance: 13,390; Referee: D Somers

20 September 2008 6	Aberdeen	0–1	Dundee United	Pittodrie Stadium
			Sandaza 47' (pen.)	Attendance: 11,041; Referee: C Murray

27 September 2008 7	Dundee United	3–0	Heart of Midlothian	Tannadice Park
	Conway 39'; Daly 50'; S Robertson 60'		Jónsson (yellow card) 74' (red card)	Attendance: 8,004; Referee: D McDonald

4 October 2008 8	Dundee United	2–1	Inverness CT	Tannadice Park
	Daly 40'; Wilkie 65'		Wilkie 89' (o.g.)	Attendance: 6,279; Referee: I Brines

25 October 2008 9	Dundee United	2–0	St Mirren	Tannadice Park
	O'Donovan 85'; Conway 90'			Attendance: 11,378; Referee: B Winter

1 November 2008 10	Falkirk	0–0	Dundee United	Falkirk Stadium
			O'Donovan (red card) 57'	Attendance: 5,608; Referee: I Brines

4 November 2008 11	Rangers	3–3	Dundee United	Ibrox Stadium
	Davis 11'; Papac 37'; Thomson 90'		Sandaza 17', 28'; Robertson 59'	Attendance: 48,686; Referee: C Thomson

8 November 2008 12	Dundee United	2–1	Aberdeen	Tannadice Park
	Sandaza 8'; Feeney 14'		Mackie 66'	Attendance: 9,490; Referee: W Collum

12 November 2008 13	Dundee United	2–0	Hibernian	Tannadice Park
	Dods 54'; Sandaza 60'			Attendance: 7,390; Referee: E Smith

15 November 2008 14	Kilmarnock	2–0	Dundee United	Rugby Park
	Hamill 45' (pen.); Fernández 61'			Attendance: 4,652; Referee: E Norris

22 November 2008 15	Dundee United	1–1	Hamilton Academical	Tannadice Park
	Easton 90' (o.g.)		Offiong 8'; Mensing (yellow card) 84' (red card)	Attendance: 6,108; Referee: C Allan

29 November 2008 16	St Mirren	0–2	Dundee United	St Mirren Park
			Daly 37', 88' (pen.)	Attendance: 4,013; Referee: C Murray

6 December 2008 17	Inverness CT	1–3	Dundee United	Caledonian Stadium
	Rooney 73'		Daly 51', Conway 64', D Robertson 71'	Attendance: 3,560; Referee: B Winter

13 December 2008 18	Dundee United	2–2	Rangers	Tannadice Park
	Wilkie 50'; Feeney 54'		Boyd 11'; Lafferty 76'	Attendance: 11,362; Referee: I Brines

20 December 2008 19	Heart of Midlothian	0–0	Dundee United	Tynecastle Stadium
				Attendance: 16,442; Referee: W Collum

27 December 2008 20	Dundee United	1–0	Falkirk	Tannadice Park
	S Robertson 21'		Barr (yellow card) 82' (red card)	Attendance: 7,972; Referee: C Boyle

3 January 2009 21	Celtic	2–2	Dundee United	Celtic Park
	Samaras 12', 57'		Dixon 59'; Feeney 77'	Attendance: 59,558; Referee: S Conroy

18 January 2009 22	Dundee United	0–4	Motherwell	Tannadice Park
			Fitzpatrick 23'; Klimpl 27'; Clarkson 33'; Porter 63'	Attendance: 7,090; Referee: E Smith

24 January 2009 23	Dundee United	3–2	St Mirren	Tannadice Park
	Feeney 71' (pen.), 84'; Buaben 82'		Ross 17'; Mehmet 73' (pen.)	Attendance: 6,556; Referee: S O'Reilly

31 January 2009 24	Rangers	2–0	Dundee United	Ibrox Stadium
	Fleck 78' (pen.); Lafferty 90'			Attendance: 49,918; Referee: I Brines

14 February 2009 25	Dundee United	1–1	Inverness CT	Tannadice Park
	Wilkie 79'		Odhiambo 16'; Duncan (red card) 71'	Attendance: 5,926; Referee: C Thomson

21 February 2009 26	Aberdeen	2–2	Dundee United	Pittodrie Stadium
	Severin 46'; Diamond 72'		Sandaza 10' (pen.); D Robertson 56'	Attendance: 14,673; Referee: W Collum

28 February 2009 27	Dundee United	0–1	Hearts	Tannadice Park
	Sandaza (penalty missed)		Stewart 62'	Attendance: 8,529; Referee: E Smith

3 March 2009 28	Falkirk	0–1	Dundee United	Falkirk Stadium
			Conway 27' (pen.)	Attendance: 4,385; Referee: D McDonald

14 March 2009 29	Motherwell	2–1	Dundee United	Fir Park
	Sutton 25'; Clarkson 75'		Sandaza 51'	Attendance: 4,798; Referee: D McDonald

22 March 2009 30	Dundee United	2–2	Celtic	Tannadice Park
	Sandaza 47', 58'		McDonald 23'; Naylor 81'	Attendance: 12,043; Referee: S Conroy

4 April 2009 31	Dundee United	2–2	Hibernian	Tannadice Park
	Conway (penalty missed); Kenneth 53'; Goodwillie 90'		Nish 6', 10'	Attendance: 6,623; Referee: E Smith

11 April 2009 32	Hamilton Academical	0–1	Dundee United	New Douglas Park
			Conway 4'	Attendance: 3,025; Referee: C Murray

18 April 2009 33	Dundee United	0–0	Kilmarnock	Tannadice Park
	Dixon (red card) 85'			Attendance: 6,627; Referee: W Collum

2 May 2009 34	Hibernian	1–2	Dundee United	Easter Road
	Fletcher 40'; Hogg (red card) 85'		Feeney 28'; Goodwillie 89'	Attendance: 10,591; Referee: S O'Reilly

7 May 2009 35	Dundee United	1–1	Aberdeen	Tannadice Park
	Goodwillie 38'		Miller 33'; Kerr (red card) 75'	Attendance: 10,407; Referee: C Boyle

12 May 2009 36	Celtic	2–1	Dundee United	Celtic Park
	Loovens 22'; Samaras 52'		D Robertson 57'	Attendance: 57,407; Referee: S Dougal

16 May 2009 37	Heart of Midlothian	3–0	Dundee United	Tynecastle Park
	Wallace 11'; Aguiar 26'; Jónsson 79' (pen.)			Attendance: 15,664; Referee: B Winter

24 May 2009 38	Dundee United	0–3	Rangers	Tannadice Park
			Lafferty 6'; Mendes 45'; Boyd 52'	Attendance: 14,077; Referee: D McDonald

=== Scottish Cup ===
11 January 2009 Fourth round	East Stirlingshire	0–4	Dundee United	Ochilview Park
15:00			Buaben 15'; Dods 40'; Daly 43'; Russell 55' (pen.)	Attendance: 2,153; Referee: M Tumilty

7 February 2009 Fifth round	Hamilton Academical	2–1	Dundee United	New Douglas Park
15:00	Swailes 47', 55'		Grainger 35'	Attendance: 3,058; Referee: C Richmond

=== Scottish League Cup ===
26 August 2008 Second round	Cowdenbeath	1–5	Dundee United	Central Park
	J Dempster 74'		Daly 30', 47'; Goodwillie 41', 60', 80'	Attendance: 1,423; Referee: E Norris

23 September 2008 Third round	Dundee United	2–0	Airdrie United	Tannadice Park
	Goodwillie 33'; S Robertson 42'			Attendance: 3,444; Referee: M Tumilty

28 October 2008 Quarter–finals	Dundee United	1–0	Dunfermline Athletic	Tannadice Park
	S Robertson 16'			Attendance: 5,350; Referee: D McDonald

28 January 2009 Semi–finals	Celtic	0–0 (a.e.t.) (11–10 p)	Dundee United	Hampden Park
19:45		Report		Attendance: 19,258; Referee: C Murray
	Penalties
	McDonald (penalty scored); Caldwell (penalty scored); Nakamura (penalty scored); Robson (penalty scored); Samaras (penalty scored); Naylor (penalty scored); Crosas (penalty scored); Brown (penalty scored); Loovens (penalty missed); Hinkel (penalty scored); Boruc (penalty scored); McDonald (penalty scored)		(penalty scored) Flood; (penalty scored) Daly; (penalty scored) Feeney; (penalty scored) Conway; (penalty scored) Dixon; (penalty scored) Gomis; (penalty scored) Kenneth; (penalty scored) Robertson; (penalty missed) Wilkie; (penalty scored) Kovačević; (penalty scored) Załuska; (penalty missed) Flood

== Player statistics ==
During the 2008–09 season so far, United have used 26 different players on the pitch. Łukasz Załuska is the only player to have played every minute this season. The table below shows the number of appearances and goals scored by each player.

No.	Pos	Nat	Player	Total		SPL		Scottish Cup		League Cup	
No.	Pos	Nat	Player	Apps	Goals	Apps	Goals	Apps	Goals	Apps	Goals
1	GK	(Poland) POL	Łukasz Załuska	44	0	38	0	2	0	4	0
2	DF	(Republic of Ireland) IRL	Seán Dillon	24	0	19	0	2	0	3	0
3	DF	(England) ENG	Danny Grainger	12	1	10	0	1	1	1	0
4	DF	(Scotland) SCO	Lee Wilkie	39	5	35	5	1	0	3	0
5	DF	(Scotland) SCO	Darren Dods	23	2	19	1	1	1	3	0
6	MF	(Republic of Ireland) IRL	Willo Flood	23	0	19	0	1	0	3	0
6	MF	(Scotland) SCO	Paul Caddis	11	0	11	0	0	0	0	0
7	FW	(Northern Ireland) NIR	Warren Feeney	26	6	23	6	1	0	2	0
8	MF	(Scotland) SCO	Scott Robertson	25	5	22	3	0	0	3	2
9	FW	(Republic of Ireland) IRL	Jon Daly	26	9	22	5	2	1	2	3
10	FW	(Republic of Ireland) IRL	Roy O'Donovan	13	1	11	1	0	0	2	0
10	MF	(Australia) AUS	James Wesolowski	8	0	8	0	0	0	0	0
11	FW	(Spain) ESP	Francisco Sandaza	35	10	31	10	1	0	3	0
12	MF	(Scotland) SCO	David Robertson	23	3	19	3	2	0	2	0
13	GK	(Northern Ireland) NIR	Michael McGovern	0	0	0	0	0	0	0	0
14	MF	(Scotland) SCO	Danny Swanson	33	0	29	0	2	0	2	0
15	MF	(Scotland) SCO	Craig Conway	41	4	35	4	2	0	4	0
16	MF	(Senegal) SEN	Morgaro Gomis	43	0	37	0	2	0	4	0
18	DF	(Scotland) SCO	Garry Kenneth	29	1	25	1	2	0	2	0
20	FW	(Kosovo) KOS	Andis Shala	9	0	8	0	0	0	1	0
23	DF	(Scotland) SCO	Paul Dixon	33	1	29	1	1	0	3	0
24	DF	(Switzerland) SUI	Mihael Kovačević	19	0	17	0	1	0	1	0
25	MF	(Ghana) GHA	Prince Buaben	25	2	22	1	2	1	1	0
26	FW	(Scotland) SCO	David Goodwillie	17	6	15	3	0	0	2	3
29	MF	(Scotland) SCO	Ryan McCord	1	0	0	0	0	0	1	0
30	FW	(Scotland) SCO	Johnny Russell	1	1	0	0	1	1	0	0

Francisco Sandaza was the top scorer with ten goals, with the team totalling 58 goals. During the 2008–09 season, fifteen United players received at least one caution. In total, the team received 60 yellow cards.

Name	Goals	Bookings	Dismissals
Prince Buaben	2	(yellow card) 4	
Paul Caddis		(yellow card) 1	
Craig Conway	4	(yellow card) 5	
Jon Daly	9	(yellow card) 2	
Seán Dillon		(yellow card) 1	
Paul Dixon	1	(yellow card) 1	(red card) 1
Darren Dods	2	(yellow card) 4	
Warren Feeney	6	(yellow card) 5	
Willo Flood		(yellow card) 7	
Morgaro Gomis		(yellow card) 4	
David Goodwillie	6	(yellow card) 2	
Danny Grainger	1	(yellow card) 4	
Garry Kenneth	1	(yellow card) 2	
Mihael Kovacevic		(yellow card) 3	
Roy O'Donovan	1	(yellow card) 2	(red card) 1
David Robertson	3	(yellow card) 2	
Scott Robertson	5	(yellow card) 2	
Johnny Russell	1		
Francisco Sandaza	10	(yellow card) 6	
Andis Shala		(yellow card) 1	
James Wesolowski		(yellow card) 3	
Lee Wilkie	5	(yellow card) 8	
Own goals	2		

== Competitions ==
=== League table ===
Pos	Team	Pld	W	D	L	GF	GA	GD	Pts	Qualification or relegation (Note: Teams played each other three times (33 matches), before the league split into two groups (the top six and the bottom six) for the last five matches.)
3	Heart of Midlothian	38	16	11	11	40	37	+3	59	Qualification for the Europa League play-off round
4	Aberdeen	38	14	11	13	41	40	+1	53	Qualification for the Europa League third qualifying round
5	Dundee United	38	13	14	11	47	50	−3	53	
6	Hibernian	38	11	14	13	42	46	−4	47	
7	Motherwell	38	13	9	16	46	51	−5	48	Qualification for the Europa League first qualifying round (Note: Scotland were awarded an additional Europa League place as the association finished in third place of the UEFA Fair Play ranking. Motherwell earned this place as winners of the Scottish Fair Play ranking.)

Source: Scottish Professional Football League
Rules for classification: 1) Points; 2) Goal difference; 3) Goals scored

== Transfers ==
=== Players in ===
Date	Player	From	Fee
1 July 2008	(Scotland) Paul Dixon	(Scotland) Dundee	£25,000
1 July 2008	(Northern Ireland) Michael McGovern	(Scotland) Celtic	Free
1 July 2008	(Scotland) Scott Robertson	(Scotland) Dundee	Free
1 July 2008	(Kosovo) Andis Shala	(Germany) VfR Mannheim	Free
11 July 2008	(Spain) Francisco Sandaza	(Spain) Valencia Mestalla	Free
12 June 2009	(England) Jennison Myrie-Williams	(England) Bristol City	Free

=== Players out ===
Date	Player	From	Fee
23 July 2008	(Republic of Ireland) Noel Hunt	(England) Reading	£600,000
15 May 2009	(Scotland) John Gibson	(Scotland) Dundee	Free
29 May 2009	(Scotland) Sean Fleming	(Scotland) Montrose	Free
29 May 2009	(Scotland) Gordon Pope	(Scotland) Montrose	Free
29 May 2009	(Scotland) Fraser Milligan	(Scotland) Montrose	Free

=== Loans in ===
Date	Player	From	Fee
1 July 2008	(Republic of Ireland) Willo Flood	(Wales) Cardiff City	Loan
8 July 2008	(Northern Ireland) Warren Feeney	(Wales) Cardiff City	Loan
8 August 2008	(Republic of Ireland) Roy O'Donovan	(England) Sunderland	Loan
2 February 2009	(Scotland) Paul Caddis	(Scotland) Celtic	Loan
2 February 2009	(Australia) James Wesolowski	(England) Leicester City	Loan

=== Loans out ===
Date	Player	From	Fee
25 July 2008	(Scotland) Kevin Smith	(Scotland) Raith Rovers	Loan
20 August 2008	(Scotland) Johnny Russell	(Scotland) Forfar Athletic	Loan
28 August 2008	(Scotland) John Gibson	(Scotland) Forfar Athletic	Loan
30 August 2008	(Scotland) Sean Fleming	(Scotland) Peterhead	Loan
10 December 2008	(Scotland) Marco Andreoni	(Scotland) Albion Rovers	Loan
2 January 2009	(Scotland) Keith Watson	(Scotland) Forfar Athletic	Loan
6 January 2009	(Scotland) Ryan McCord	(Scotland) Stirling Albion	Loan
6 January 2009	(Scotland) Sean Fleming	(Scotland) Albion Rovers	Loan
23 January 2009	(Scotland) Gordon Pope	(Scotland) Montrose	Loan
23 January 2009	(Scotland) Kevin Smith	(Scotland) Raith Rovers	Loan
23 February 2009	(Scotland) Greg Cameron	(Republic of Ireland) Shamrock Rovers	Loan
6 March 2009	(Scotland) Fraser Milligan	(Scotland) Montrose	Loan

== Awards ==
=== Rising Star ===
- Ryan Dow: 1

September 2008

== See also ==
- 2008–09 Scottish Premier League
- 2008–09 Scottish Cup
- 2008–09 Scottish League Cup
- 2008–09 in Scottish football
