= Willo Flood =

Irish footballer (born 1985)

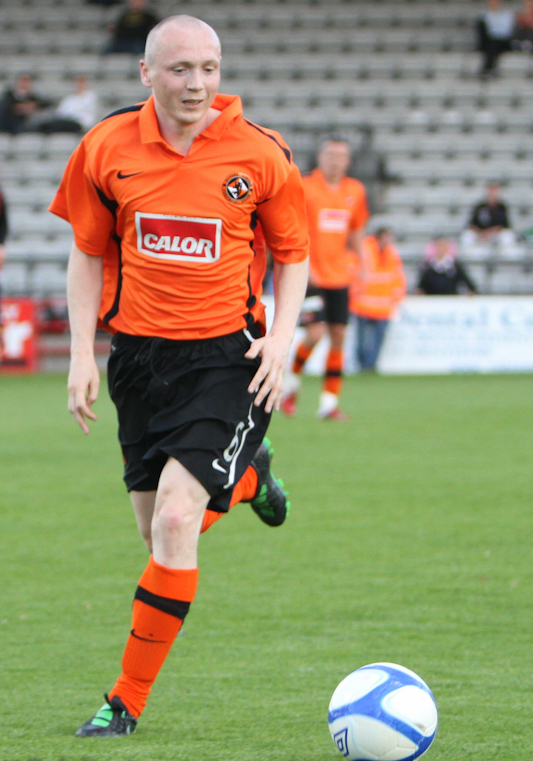
- Flood playing for Dundee United in 2011

Personal information
- Full name: William Robert Flood
- Date of birth: 10 April 1985 (age 41)
- Place of birth: Dublin, Ireland
- Height: 5 ft 6 in (1.68 m)
- Position: Midfielder

Youth career
- Cherry Orchard
- Manchester City

Senior career*
Years	Team	Apps	(Gls)
2002–2006	Manchester City	14	(1)
2004	→ Rochdale (loan)	6	(0)
2005	→ Coventry City (loan)	8	(1)
2006–2009	Cardiff City	25	(1)
2007–2008	→ Dundee United (loan)	36	(1)
2008–2009	→ Dundee United (loan)	20	(0)
2009–2010	Celtic	6	(0)
2010–2011	Middlesbrough	16	(1)
2011–2013	Dundee United	69	(3)
2013–2016	Aberdeen	80	(3)
2016–2018	Dundee United	62	(3)
2018	Dunfermline Athletic	0	(0)
Total		342	(14)

International career
2003	Republic of Ireland U20	4	(0)
2004–2006	Republic of Ireland U21	11	(2)
- * Club domestic league appearances and goals

William Robert Flood (born 10 April 1985) is an Irish former professional footballer who played as a midfielder. He earned 15 caps for his country at under-20 and under-21 levels. He represented eight clubs in England and Scotland including Manchester City, Cardiff City, Dundee United, Celtic, Middlesbrough and Aberdeen.

== Early life ==
Born in Dublin, Ireland, Flood grew up on a housing estate in the Ballyfermot area of the city. He began his football career at Cherry Orchard, joining at seven years old. At the age of 14, Flood dislocated his patella playing in the All-Ireland Final, describing it the injury as "very sore". Despite the injury, Cherry Orchard won the final, resulting in Flood receiving the winners' medal, which was his only one until he won the Scottish League Cup in 2014 with Aberdeen. While at Cherry Orchard, Flood was mentored by Barry Pointon, who had known him since he was 15. Flood's performances for Cherry Orchard attracted interest from Celtic, Manchester United and Arsenal, but he opted to join Manchester City instead, due to their partnership at the time.

== Club career ==
=== Manchester City ===
Immediately after joining Manchester City, Flood was assigned to the academy. Having faced with an injury at his previous youth club, he had his injuries sorted by City's medical team and was grateful towards the club. saying: "If it wasn't for them I wouldn't be playing football". Having been called up to the first team in the 2003–04 season, Flood made his debut in the qualifying round of the 2003–04 UEFA Cup, in a 7–0 aggregate win over Total Network Solutions. Following this, he continued to maintain his development in City's reserve team.

On 21 September 2004, Flood was called up to City's first team for a match against Barnsley in the Football League Cup and scored his first career goal, in a 7–1 win to help the club advance to the next round. Three days later, he made his Premiership debut, coming on as a 76th-minute substitute, in a 1–0 loss against Arsenal. On 1 November, Flood scored his first career league goal in his first league start, in a 1–1 draw at home to Norwich City. After the match, Kevin Keegan was impressed with Flood's display, saying he "has got the vital ingredient for someone his size and that is a big heart". Following this performance, Flood signed a new contract with City, keeping him until 2007. Flood appeared in four league matches, making three starts between 24 October and 13 November. Following an injury crisis, he appeared two times in the first team, coming against Bolton Wanderers and Tottenham Hotspur in March 2005. At the end of the 2004–05 season, Flood went on to make twelve appearances and scoring two times in all competitions. Local newspaper Manchester Evening News said about the player: "Flood played four matches in a row in October–November when he opened his scoring account but his form seemed to tail off and other Academy products have jumped ahead of him. Needs to kick on with his career again."

Following his loan spell at Coventry City came to an end, Flood suffered a hernia injury that saw him out for the rest of the year. On 15 February 2006, he then made his return from injury, playing for City's reserve team, in a 4–0 win against Sunderland's reserve team. On 25 March 2006, Flood made his first team appearance for the club, starting the whole game, in a 2–0 loss. After the match, manager Stuart Pearce praised his performance. At the end of the 2005–06 season, he went on to make five appearances in all competitions.

==== Loan spells from Manchester City ====
On 15 March 2004, Flood was loaned out to Third Division side Rochdale for a month. The following day, he made his debut for the club, starting a match and played 88 minutes before being substituted, in a 1–1 draw against Huddersfield Town. Flood appeared in the next six matches for Rochdale, as the club were trying to avoid relegation. After a month loan spell with Rochdale, he returned to his parent club, making six appearances for the club.

At the start of the 2005–06 season, Flood joined Championship side Coventry City on a month's loan. On 20 August 2005, he made his debut for the club, starting a match and played 73 minutes before being substituted, in a 3–0 win against Queens Park Rangers. Since joining Coventry, Flood received a handful of first team football, playing in the midfield position. For his performance, he had loan spell with the club extended into a second month. However, Flood received criticism for his performance while playing for Coventry's reserve team. On 28 September, he was able to make up with his performance by scoring his second career league goal, in a 3–1 win at home to Watford. On 28 October, Flood returned to his parent club after the club decided to terminate his loan contract. During his time at Coventry, he made eight appearances, scoring once.

=== Cardiff City ===
Flood joined Championship club Cardiff City for a fee of £200,000, paid in instalments, Upon joining the club, he describe leaving Manchester City as a "wrench", but believe that Dave Jones could help him improve as a player, due to his track record as a manager.

Flood made his debut for Cardiff, coming on as an 82nd-minute substitute, in a 2–1 win against Barnsley in the opening game of the season. On 19 August 2006, he scored his only goal for Cardiff, a memorable winning goal at Elland Road. However, Flood found his first team opportunities limited, due to competition, and was placed on the substitute bench as a result. He also faced his own injury concerns along the way throughout the 2006–07 season. As a result, Flood was restricted to making twenty–eight appearances and scoring once in all competitions for the Bluebirds.

==== Dundee United loans ====
However, after struggling to settle at Ninian Park, Flood joined Scottish Premier League side Dundee United on a season-long loan for the 2007/08 season. Upon joining the club, Cardiff manager Dave Jones wished to see how he would perform over a long season of first-team football. Flood's debut resulted in a red card before half time on the opening day of the season against Aberdeen, after collecting two cautions, and his second match, for the reserves, resulted in the same outcome. On this occasion, he was "bizarrely sent off...for taking a quick free kick when the referee was apparently not ready." After serving a one match suspension, Flood returned to the starting line–up, in a 0–0 against Hibernian on 18 August 2007. He quickly established himself in the first team, playing in the midfield position, and his performances were praised by manager Craig Levein, describing him as "a really good, creative player". At times, Levein put Flood in the right–back position, due to the club's defensive crisis.

On 15 December 2007, he scored his first goal for Dundee United against St Mirren in a 3–0 win, a goal which later earned him the SPL Goal of the Season award. In follow-up interviews the next day after winning the award, Flood said he would be disappointed to leave the club at the end of the season, admitting he would be "gutted because I have loved it here." In the Scottish League Cup final against Rangers, Flood started the whole game for 120 minutes following a 2–2 draw and was the first Dundee United player to successfully the convert the penalty in the shootout, which the club went on to lose on penalties. After the match, he was named Man of the Match by Scottish newspapers, due to his impressive performance. On 6 April 2008, Flood was at fault when he "inexplicably passed straight to Barry Ferguson", which led to Kris Boyd scoring the opposition team's third equalising goal, in a 3–3 draw Rangers on 6 April 2008. After the match, teammate Mark Kerr leapt to defend Flood, saying he was not to blame for his mistakes. Despite suffering injuries on three occasions throughout the 2007–08 season, Flood made forty–four appearances and scoring once in all competitions.

Despite returning to Cardiff at the end of the season, a second season-long loan was agreed in July 2008. Flood made four starts in the first four league matches of the season before he suffered a hamstring injury that saw him miss two matches. On 27 September 2008, Flood returned from injury and set up the club's second goal of the game, in a 3–0 win against Hearts. Since returning from injury, he continued to remain in the first team, playing in the midfield position. In the semi-finals of the Scottish League Cup against Celtic, Flood started the whole game for 120 minutes following a 0–0 draw and missed the eleventh penalty, which Dundee United went on to lose on penalties (he previously successfully converted the first penalty kick earlier). Four years on, Flood admitted that the penalty left him with bitter memories when he compared the penalty miss to Manchester United's match in the League Cup against Sunderland on 22 January 2014. When his move to Celtic came to light, Manager Craig Levein urged Flood to stay at Dundee United, rather than joining Celtic, and the player, himself, agreed. By the time Flood departed from the club, he made twenty–four appearances in all competitions.

=== Celtic ===
Flood joined Celtic on 30 January 2009, signing a two-and-a-half-year contract for an undisclosed fee, for the team he supported as a boy. Upon joining the club, Flood's move to Celtic was not well received by the Bhoys supporters, with some of them believing he was "not good enough for Parkhead". Flood was also given a number sixteen shirt, previously worn by his idol Roy Keane. On 15 February, he made his debut for Celtic, playing 62 minutes before being substituted in a 0–0 draw against bitter rivals, Rangers at Celtic Park. After the match, Flood said his move to Celtic was "a big shock for him" and "a great honour to get that chance" to make his debut for the club. However, he found his first team opportunities hard to come by and found his playing time, coming from the substitute bench. In his first half season at Celtic, Flood made five appearances in all competitions.

By the start of the 2009–10 season, with Celtic under the new management of Tony Mowbray, Flood found himself out of the first team and expressed unhappiness that he was considering leaving the club. At one point, Dundee United considered signing him, but manager Craig Levein denied that the move was happening. Despite not being a first team player regularly on 18 August 2009, Flood made his UEFA Champions League debut coming on as substitute for Shaun Maloney in the 61st minute, in a 3–1 loss against Arsenal in the Champions League Qualifying Round, resulting in the club's elimination from the tournament. He made two more starts, coming from the Scottish League Cup match against Falkirk and a UEFA Europa League match against Rapid Wien. In December 2009, Flood admitted he "regretted" joining Celtic, describing it as "a mistake". Manager Mowbray said he would sell Flood at the right price, along with the "frustrated fringe players". By the he left the club in January, he made four appearances in all competitions.

After leaving Celtic, Flood stated he didn't consider himself a Celtic player, citing his frustrating spells there. Despite this, Flood stated that Neil Lennon, who was then the club's reserve manager, helped him keep his focus while facing difficulties and for keeping him sane.

=== Middlesbrough ===
On 13 January 2010, it was announced that Flood had left Celtic for Championship side Middlesbrough, along with his teammates Barry Robson and Chris Killen. Upon joining the club, he said that he enjoyed working with manager Gordon Strachan when they were together for six months at Celtic and chance to work with a manager that trusts him was the biggest influence on to come to Middlesbrough. On 16 January, Flood made his debut for the club, 75 minutes before being substituted, in a 1–0 loss against Sheffield United. On 23 January, he scored his first Boro goal in his second game against Swansea City from a cross which turned into a 35-yard shot into the top corner, in a 1–1 draw. Flood made nine starts for the club, playing in midfield. On 6 March, however, he sustained a knee injury during the second half of a match and was substituted, in a 1–0 loss against his former club Cardiff City. At first, there was no suggestion of major knee injury, but Flood was out for the rest of the season. At the end of the 2009–10 season, he went on to make eleven appearances and scoring once in all competitions.

Ahead of the 2010–11 season, Flood recovered from the knee injury and joined Middlesbrough's pre-season tour. While in pre-season, he said his aim is to force his way back into the first team at the club. In the opening league game of the season against Ipswich Town, however, Flood suffered a serious injury with a dislocated knee, a previous injured he sustained while at Cherry Orchard, after a collision with teammate Matthew Bates and was taken off before half time. After the match, manager Strachan said Flood would not return for a long time because of a bad injury" and "he's been very unlucky, especially having just come back from another long-term injury". As a result, Flood was out for six months with the injury. In early February, he made his return to the first team training. Flood made his first appearance from injury when he played 60 minutes for the club's reserve Team against Leeds United reserves. Following the match, Flood was praised by manager Tony Mowbray on his return from injury. On 16 April 2011, Flood made his first appearance since being injured, coming on as a 60th-minute substitute for Andy Halliday as Middlesbrough drew 1–1 with Barnsley. At the end of the 2010–11 season, he went on to make five appearances in all competitions. On 10 May 2011, it was announced on the club's website that Flood would be released along with Maximilian Haas and Andrew Davies.

=== Dundee United (first permanent spell) ===
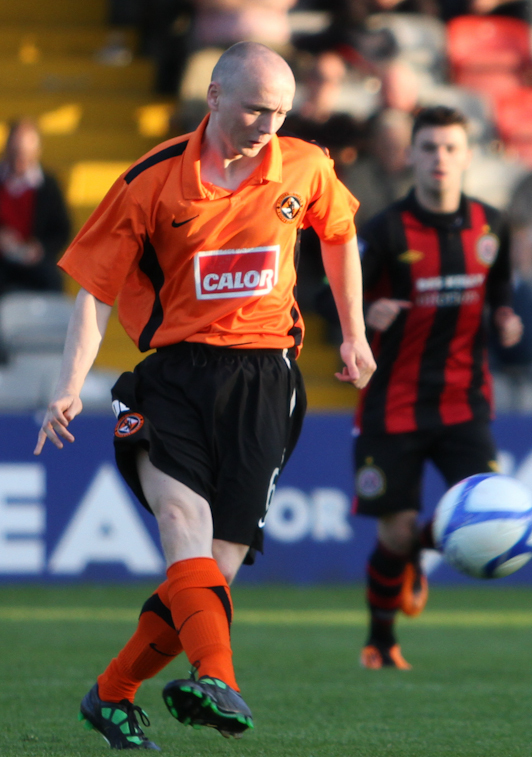
Flood playing for Dundee United in 2011, in the pre-season friendly match against Bohemians.

On 24 May 2011, Flood returned to Dundee United, where he signed a two-year contract with the club. Former teammate Craig Conway, who just left the club for Cardiff City, was reported to have said that Flood's return was a "good piece of business" and the Arabs supporters will enjoy his arrival. Upon joining Dundee United, Flood said he's "playing his best football at The Tangerines" and "the best time of his career". Flood was previously linked with a move to Hearts but he opted to re–join Dundee United.

Flood made his third debut for the club, starting the whole game, in a 1–0 loss against Śląsk Wrocław, in the first leg of the UEFA Europa League Second qualifying round. However, Dundee United were eliminated from the UEFA Europa League through away goals, despite winning 3–2 in the return leg. Since re-joining the club, he quickly regained his first team place, playing in the midfield position. In the Scottish League Cup quarter final against Falkirk, Flood started the whole game for 120 minutes following a 2–2 draw and missed the third penalty, which Dundee United went on to lose on penalties. After the match, Flood revealed that he had to make an apology to Manager Peter Houston via text for missing the penalty. Between late–December and February, Flood found himself out of the starting line–up, due to injury concern and his own performance. On 21 February 2012, he made his return to the starting line–up for the first time in a month, and set up a goal for John Rankin, in a 4–0 win against Kilmarnock. On 28 April 2012, Flood scored his first goal for Dundee United in his third spell at the club, scoring from a "superb, low 30-yard drive found the far corner of the Hearts net", and then set up a goal for Gary Mackay-Steven in a 2–2 draw against Hearts. At the end of the 2011–12 season, he made thirty–nine appearances and scoring once in all competitions.

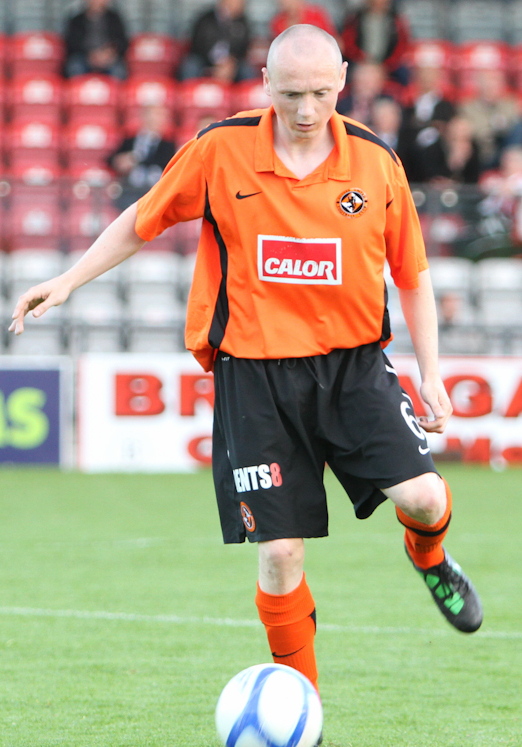
Flood in action for Dundee United back in 2011, in the pre-season friendly match against Bohemians.

At the start of the 2012–13 season, Flood scored in the UEFA Europa League qualifying third round tie, against Dynamo Moscow, in a 2–2 draw. However, he was unable to help Dundee United overturn the deficit in the return leg, as the club loss 5–0, resulting in their elimination from the tournament. On 17 August 2012, Flood played a key role in a match against Dundee United's rival, Dundee when he set up two goals, in a 3–0 win. Since the start of the 2012–13 season, Flood continued to establish himself in the first team, playing in different midfield positions. On 7 December 2012, he scored his second goal of the season, in a 3–0 win against rivals, Dundee. On 9 February 2013, Flood scored his third goal of the season, in a 3–1 win against Hearts. On 11 May 2013, he played in the right–back position for the first time this season against Inverness Caledonian Thistle and set up a winning goal for Gary Mackay-Steven, in a 2–1 win. Flood's season did not impact him, as he found himself being out with injuries and suspension on five occasions throughout the season. At the end of the 2012–13 season, Flood made forty–five appearances and scoring three times in all competitions. For his performance, he was named the supporters' player of the year award.

At the end of the 2012–13 season, Flood stated his desire extend his contract and to stay at the club, and he expected 'something can get sorted'. New appointed manager Jackie McNamara, who replaced Peter Houston, said he was keen for Flood to stay at Dundee United. During his second two-year spell at the club, he made 69 appearances and scoring three times.

=== Aberdeen ===
On 31 May 2013, it was announced that Flood had signed a pre-contract with Aberdeen. Upon joining the club, he said his aim at Aberdeen was to win trophies. Manager Derek McInnes was keen to sign Flood, describing him as an "ideal" signing.

He scored his first goal on his debut for the club, in a 2–1 win against Kilmarnock in the opening game of the season. After the match, McInnes praised Flood's performance, describing him as "the catalyst, energetic, passionate and dictates the tempo of the game, with and without the ball." Having made four appearances for Aberdeen so far, however, he sustained a hamstring injury while chasing a ball, and was substituted in the 55th minute, as the club beat Alloa Athletic 6–5 in penalty shoot-out in the second round of Scottish League Cup on 27 August 2013. After a scan, Flood tore his muscle and was expected to be out for six weeks but he recovered than expected. On 5 October 2013, Flood made his return from injury, coming on as a 56th-minute substitute, in a 1–0 loss against Ross County. After the match, he spoke of his "frustration" on being out with a muscle injury. Having made three starts in the next three matches, however on 9 November 2013, Flood suffered another injury when he sustained a hamstring injury and was substituted in the 23rd minute, in a 3–1 loss against Hearts. After the match, it was announced that Flood would be out for a further six weeks. On 7 December 2013, he returned from injury, following a three weeks absent, coming on as a 77th-minute substitute for Jonny Hayes, in a 2–0 win against St Johnstone. Since returning from injury, Flood regained his first team place, playing in the midfield position for the rest of the 2013–14 season. On 10 January 2014, he scored from a 22-yard winning goal in the 87th minute, in a 1–0 home win against Hibernian, a goal that was later earned him the SPFL Goal of the Month for January. After helping Aberdeen reach the Scottish League Cup final and Scottish Cup quarter-finals against Inverness CT and Celtic respectively, manager McInnes praised Flood performance, describing his "consistency of performance, and bring both attitude and brings a real mentality to the whole club." In the Scottish League Cup final against Inverness Caledonian Thistle, he started the whole game for 120 minutes following a 0–0 draw and Aberdeen won 4–2 on penalties to win the tournament. On 2 April 2014, Flood scored from a free kick to break a deadlock in the 74th minute, in a 1–1 draw against Hearts. Flood's first season at the club ended positively, winning their first Scottish League Cup in nineteen years, and finishing third place in the league, as he made forty appearances and scoring three times in all competitions.

At the start of the 2014–15 season, Flood played all six matches in Aberdeen's matches in the UEFA Europa League but the club was eliminated by Real Sociedad. On 21 August 2014, he signed a 12-month contract extension with Aberdeen, keeping him until 2017. However, Flood suffered a hamstring injury that saw him miss one match. On 13 September 2014, he made his return from injury, starting the whole game, in a 2–1 loss against Celtic. On 9 November 2014, however, Flood suffered a hamstring injury for the second time and was substituted in the 9th minute, in a 2–1 loss against Celtic. After the match, it was announced that he would be out for two months. On 4 January 2015, Flood returned from injury, coming on as a substitute for David Goodwillie in the 86th minute, in a 2–0 win over Motherwell. However, Flood continued to be out on three occasions towards the end of the 2014–15 season. Despite this, he continued to regain his first team place, playing in the midfield position. At the end of the 2014–15 season, he went on to make thirty–three appearances in all competitions.

In the opening game of the 2015–16 season, Flood captained Aberdeen for the first time against his former club Dundee United and helped the club win 1–0. However, throughout the season, he found himself alternating between a starting and a substitute role in the first team. Flood also found himself plagued by injuries that affected his third season at Aberdeen. At the end of the 2015–16 season, Flood made twenty–nine appearances in all competitions.

Ahead of the 2016–17 season, he was linked with a return move to relegated side Dundee United. Amid to his future at Aberdeen, Flood played in both legs of the UEFA Europa League first round match against CS Fola Esch, winning 3–2 on aggregate. On 14 July 2016, his contract with the club was terminated. He spoke out about his departure from Aberdeen, citing his desire for first team football.

=== Dundee United (second permanent spell) ===
Flood returned to Dundee United in July 2016 for his fourth spell with the club, initially signing a one-year deal. In doing so, he took a pay cut and wouldn't join any other Scottish clubs but Dundee United.

On 19 July 2016, Flood made his fourth debut for the club, starting the whole game, in a 6–1 win against Cowdenbeath in the Scottish League Cup. He added two goals throughout August, scoring against Ayr United and Raith Rovers. Flood captained Dundee United on four occasions between 13 August 2016 and 17 September 2016. During his fourth reign as captain in a 3–0 loss against Falkirk on 17 September 2016, he suffered a thigh injury, resulting in his substitution in the 53rd minute, and was out for three weeks. On 15 October 2016, Flood made his return from injury, starting the whole game, in a 2–0 win against St Mirren. Since returning from injury, he regained his first team place for the club in the first team, playing in the midfield position. On 25 March 2017, Flood started in the Scottish Challenge Cup final against St Mirren and helped Dundee United win 2–1 to win the tournament. Having aimed to help the club reach promotion back to the Scottish Premiership, he helped Dundee United finish third place in the league and qualified for the Premiership play–offs. Flood played all six matches in the play–offs, as the club reached final against Hamilton Academical but Dundee United fell short, losing 1–0 on aggregate, failing to win back promotion to the Scottish Premiership. Despite suffering minor injuries throughout the 2016–17 season, he made forty–seven appearances and scoring two times in all competitions. On 21 June 2017, Flood signed a contract extension with the club and aimed to help Dundee United reach promotion to Scottish Premiership once again.

At the start of the 2017–18 season, Flood found his playing time, coming from the substitute bench, having recovered from an injury during Dundee United's pre–season. He began to take up the captain duties in the absence of Tam Scobbie throughout the season. On 2 September 2017, Flood scored from a last minute free kick, in a 3–1 win against Alloa Athletic in the Scottish Challenge Cup. Following the absence of Lewis Toshney, he played twice in the right–back position against Dunfermline Athletic and Livingston. Following this, Flood regained his first team place, playing in the different midfield positions. On 19 November 2017, he scored his second goal of the season, in a 3–0 win against Falkirk. Between 13 January 2018 and 20 January 2018, Flood, once again, played twice in the right–back position against Dunfermline Athletic and Alloa Athletic. After helping the club qualify for the Premiership play–offs, he played in both legs of the quarter–finals play–offs against Dunfermline Athletic and helped Dundee United advance to the semi–finals after the club won 2–1 on aggregate. In the first leg of the semi–finals play–offs against Livingston, he received a red card for a second bookable offence, in a 3–2 loss (in what turned out to be his last match in his professional football career). His suspension in the return leg saw Dundee United draw 1–1, resulting in the club failing to win promotion back to the Scottish Premiership for the second time. Other than suspension, Flood's season did not have any affected impact despite suffering minor injuries on three occasions. At the end of the 2017–18 season, Flood went on to make thirty–eight appearances and scoring two times in all competitions. Shortly after, he was one of a number of players released by Dundee United. Flood revealed he rejected a chance to stay at the club and was offered a youth coach role but he rejected it to continue playing.

=== Dunfermline Athletic and Bali United ===
Following his departure from Dundee United, Flood signed a one-year contract with fellow Scottish Championship club Dunfermline Athletic on 18 June 2018. Upon joining the club, manager Allan Johnston felt the signing of Flood would benefit Dunfermline Athletic's promotion to the Scottish Championship. However, Flood left Dunfermline just over a week after signing with the club, as he had received an offer from Indonesian club Bali United. On 6 July 2018, he was officially announced as a Bali player. However, three days later, it was reported that eligibility rules on foreign players had meant that the deal could not be completed.

=== Retirement ===
Flood announced his retirement from football aged 34, with the aim of pursuing a career as a football agent, in August 2019. Four months earlier, he made hints about retiring from professional football, having no interest to continue playing.

While playing for Aberdeen, Flood also took up coaching lessons in hopes of obtaining a UEFA License badge.

== International career ==
Flood previously represented Republic of Ireland U16, Republic of Ireland U17, Republic of Ireland U18 and Republic of Ireland U19. In January 2003, Flood was called up to the Republic of Ireland under-20 squad for the first time, but he did not play. Later in the same year, Flood was called up to the FIFA World Youth Championship in UAE. He played four times in the tournament, as Republic of Ireland U20 were eliminated in the Round of 16 against Colombia U20.

In October 2003, Flood was called up for the Republic of Ireland under-21 squad. He was called up to the U21 squad for the Madeira International Tournament in February 2004. On 25 February 2004, Flood made his Republic of Ireland U21 debut against Portugal U21, as the U21 side drew 0–0. He began to feature for the U21 squad regularly between 2004 and 2006. On 7 October 2005, Flood scored his first goal for Republic of Ireland U21, in a 1–1 draw against Cyprus U21. His good performances resulted in Republic of Ireland U21 team manager Don Givens suggesting Flood could be the next captain for the U21 side. This turns out to be correctly predicted, as on 1 September 2006, he captained Republic of Ireland U21, in a 1–0 loss against Belgium U21.

Flood's performance at Aberdeen caught the eye of Roy Keane, earning him a call-up to the Republic of Ireland Senior squad.

== Personal life ==
Flood has a brother, Shane, and grew up in a family of Celtic supporters. In June 2007, he became a first-time father when his wife Antoinette gave birth to their first child, causing his move to Dundee United put on hold for the time being.

In December 2005, Flood's home in the Wythenshawe area of Manchester was the subject of a burglary in which he was threatened and taunted at knifepoint for over 20 minutes by a 29-year-old man. The ordeal left Flood with recurring nightmares, resulting in him needing counselling and being unable to live alone.

== Career statistics ==
As of match played 4 November 2017

Appearances and goals by club, season and competition
Club	Season	League			National Cup		League Cup		Europe		Other		Total	
Club	Season	Division	Apps	Goals	Apps	Goals	Apps	Goals	Apps	Goals	Apps	Goals	Apps	Goals
Manchester City	2003–04	Premier League	0	0	0	0	0	0	1 (Note: Appearance in the UEFA Cup)	0	—		1	0
Manchester City	2004–05	Premier League	9	1	2	0	1	1	—		—		12	2
Manchester City	2005–06	Premier League	5	0	0	0	0	0	—		—		5	0
Manchester City	Total		14	1	2	0	1	1	1	0	—		18	2
Rochdale (loan)	2003–04	Third Division	6	0	0	0	0	0	—		0	0	6	0
Coventry City (loan)	2005–06	Championship	8	1	0	0	0	0	—		—		8	1
Cardiff City	2006–07	Championship	25	1	2	0	1	0	—		—		28	1
Dundee United (loan)	2007–08	Scottish Premier League	36	1	3	0	5	0	0	0	—		44	1
Dundee United (loan)	2008–09	Scottish Premier League	20	0	1	0	3	0	0	0	—		24	0
Dundee United (loan)	Total		56	1	4	0	8	0	0	0	—		68	1
Celtic	2008–09	Scottish Premier League	5	0	0	0	0	0	0	0	—		5	0
Celtic	2009–10	Scottish Premier League	1	0	0	0	1	0	2 (Note: One appearance in the Champions League and one in the Europa League)	0	—		4	0
Celtic	Total		6	0	0	0	1	0	2	0	—		9	0
Middlesbrough	2009–10	Championship	11	1	0	0	0	0	—		—		11	1
Middlesbrough	2010–11	Championship	5	0	0	0	0	0	—		—		5	0
Middlesbrough	Total		16	1	0	0	0	0	—		—		16	1
Dundee United	2011–12	Scottish Premier League	32	1	3	0	2	0	2 (Note: Appearances in the Europa League)	0	—		39	1
Dundee United	2012–13	Scottish Premier League	37	2	4	0	2	0	2	1	—		45	3
Dundee United	Total		69	3	7	0	4	0	4	1	—		84	4
Aberdeen	2013–14	Scottish Premier League	33	3	3	0	4	0	—		—		40	3
Aberdeen	2014–15	Scottish Premier League	25	0	0	0	2	0	6	0	—		33	0
Aberdeen	2015–16	Scottish Premier League	22	0	1	0	1	0	5	0	—		29	0
Aberdeen	2016–17	Scottish Premier League	0	0	0	0	0	0	2	0	—		2	0
Aberdeen	Total		80	3	4	0	7	0	13	0	—		104	3
Dundee United	2016–17	Scottish Championship	32	2	4	0	2	0	—		9 (Note: Three appearances in the Scottish Challenge Cup and six in the Premiership play-offs)	0	47	2
Dundee United	2017–18	Scottish Championship	9	0	0	0	1	0	—		2 (Note: Appearances in the Scottish Challenge Cup)	1	12	1
Dundee United	Total		41	2	4	0	3	0	—		11	1	59	3
Career total			289	11	18	0	24	1	20	1	11	1	354	14

== Honours ==
Aberdeen

- Scottish League Cup: 2013–14

Dundee United

- Scottish Challenge Cup: 2016–17

Individual

- Scottish Premier League Goal of the Season: 2007–08
- FAI Under-15 International Player of the Year: 2001
- FAI Under-17 International Player of the Year: 2002
- FAI Under-19 International Player of the Year: 2004
