= Grant Smith (footballer, born 1980) =

Scottish footballer

Personal information
- Full name: Grant Gordon Smith
- Date of birth: 5 May 1980 (age 46)
- Place of birth: Irvine, Scotland
- Position: Midfielder

Senior career*
Years	Team	Apps	(Gls)
1997–1998	Wycombe Wanderers	0	(0)
1998–1999	Reading	0	(0)
1999–2000	Hearts	0	(0)
2000–2001	Livingston	32	(0)
2000–2001	→ Clydebank (loan)	17	(2)
2001–2003	Sheffield United	10	(0)
2000	→ Halifax Town (loan)	11	(0)
2003	→ Plymouth Argyle (loan)	5	(1)
2003–2005	Swindon Town	33	(10)
2005–2006	Bristol City	11	(0)
2006	→ Walsall (loan)	13	(3)
2006–2007	Dundee United	6	(0)
2007	HJK Helsinki	21	(1)
2007	→ Klubi-04 (loan)	1	(1)
2008–2009	Carlisle United	17	(1)
2009	Droylsden	1	(0)
2009–2010	North Queensland Fury	5	(0)
2010	Ross County	4	(0)
2011	Airdrie United	8	(0)
Total		195	(19)
- * Club domestic league appearances and goals

Grant Gordon Smith (born 5 May 1980) is a Scottish former professional footballer who played as a midfielder. He is the son of former Rangers and Brighton & Hove Albion striker and former Scottish Football Association chief executive Gordon Smith.

== Playing career ==
Smith was born in Irvine. He signed a short-term contract with Dundee United in September 2006, agreeing to stay until the next transfer window in January 2007. Smith also played for English sides Bristol City and Walsall (on loan).

Smith then signed one-year contract with Finnish club HJK Helsinki in April 2007.

Smith returned to Britain in January 2008 and joined Carlisle United on a short-term contract until the end of the season, after training with the club's squad. On 8 April 2009, he was released from Carlisle United by mutual consent after not making a single first team appearance under new boss Greg Abbott who later denied any fall-out with Smith even though impressing in reserve games out of position.

He went to Singapore for trials with some of the local S-League teams for the 2010 season. He was brought to Singapore by the Football Association of Singapore (FAS) as part of their centralised scouting system of foreign players for S-League clubs

On 18 December 2009, he signed a short-term injury replacement deal with North Queensland Fury in the A-League linking up with Fury manager Ian Ferguson and Liverpool legend Robbie Fowler.

In February 2010, Smith returned to Scotland to sign for Ross County.

After joining Scottish 2nd Division club Airdrie United in January 2011, he was released by them a few months later in May.

== Post-playing career ==
Smith became an agent after retiring from playing, representing players such as Nathan Patterson and Barrie McKay.

== See also ==
- 2006–07 Dundee United F.C. season
