= David Robertson (footballer, born 1986) =

Scottish footballer

Personal information
- Date of birth: 23 September 1986 (age 40)
- Place of birth: Livingston, Scotland
- Position: Attacking midfielder

Youth career
- 2002–05: Dundee United

Senior career*
Years	Team	Apps	(Gls)
2005–2011	Dundee United	120	(17)
2011–2013	St Johnstone	23	(2)
2014	Greenock Morton	16	(0)
2014–2015	Livingston	13	(0)
2015	Ayr United	12	(1)
2015–2016	Selkirk		
2016–2017	Cowdenbeath	7	(0)
Total		191	(20)

International career
2005	Scotland U19	1	(0)
2007–2008	Scotland U21	3	(0)
- * Club domestic league appearances and goals

David Robertson (born 23 September 1986) is a Scottish former professional footballer, who played as an attacking midfielder for Dundee United, St Johnstone, Greenock Morton, Livingston, Ayr United, Selkirk and Cowdenbeath. He won the Scottish Cup with Dundee United in 2010 and represented the Scotland under-21 team. Robertson retired from football in January 2017 after being found in a civil trial to have committed rape with fellow footballer David Goodwillie.

== Career ==
=== Dundee United ===
Livingston-born Robertson joined Dundee United as a youth player and was the top scorer in the 2004–05 SPL Youth League, despite playing from midfield. Robertson made his debut for United in January 2006, in the 1–1 draw against Aberdeen, when he came off the bench in the last few minutes to replace player/manager Craig Brewster who was injured while making his second debut. Robertson scored his first goal three months later in 3–1 league defeat to Livingston, and his late extra-time winner sent United through to the Scottish League Cup third round at the start of the following season. Further league goals came against Inverness Caledonian Thistle (twice) and Celtic, with a cup strike against St Mirren ensuring that Robertson's goals in 2006–07 saw him never finish on the losing side. Indeed, Robertson's form saw him sign a new two-year contract during February of that season.

In September 2007, Robertson won his first Scotland under-21 cap and later that season came on as an extra-time substitute in the 2008 Scottish League Cup final against Rangers, missing one of United's penalties in the defeat. In January 2009, Robertson signed a further extension to his contract, committing himself to the club until May 2011. On 24 March 2010, Robertson scored a vital last minute winner against Rangers in the quarter-final of the Scottish Cup, which Dundee United went on to win for only the second time in their 100-year history. In the 2010 Scottish Cup final Robertson played as a substitute.

=== St Johnstone ===
Despite being offered a new contract by United in 2011, Robertson opted instead to sign for St Johnstone. Robertson made his debut for St Johnstone in a league game against Aberdeen on 23 July 2011.

On 28 November 2012, Robertson was injured during St Johnstone's match against Hibernian and the following day, it was confirmed by the club's manager Steve Lomas that Robertson had broken his leg.

On 13 December 2013, St Johnstone announced that Robertson would not be given a new contract when his current deal expired. In December 2013, Robertson went on trial at Greenock Morton.

=== Greenock Morton ===
On 3 January 2014, Robertson signed for Greenock Morton.

Robertson's father Dougie played almost 200 games for Morton between 1983 and 1990.

=== Livingston and Ayr United ===
In the summer of 2014 Robertson left Morton to sign for Livingston. He scored on his competitive debut for the club, coming on in the 112th minute against Queen of the South and scoring just minutes later to secure the extra-time victory.

After seven months with Livingston, Robertson transferred to Scottish League One side Ayr United on a short-term deal. At the end of the 2014–15 season, Robertson was released by The Honest Men.

=== Selkirk and Cowdenbeath ===
On 18 December 2015, Robertson signed for Lowland League club Selkirk. After six months with Selkirk, Robertson returned to the SPFL, signing for Scottish League Two side Cowdenbeath in June 2016. Robertson retired from football in January 2017, after a judge ruled that he had raped a woman.

== Rape judgement ==
Robertson and David Goodwillie, who was then a teammate of Robertson at Dundee United, were accused of raping a woman in January 2011. Goodwillie was charged with rape, but the Scottish legal authorities decided not pursue a criminal prosecution. The woman then took a civil action against Robertson and Goodwillie. On 17 January 2017, Robertson and Goodwillie were ruled to be rapists and ordered to pay £100,000 in compensation. The civil case was judged on the balance of probabilities and did not need corroboration of evidence, unlike in a Scottish criminal case. Robertson's club, Cowdenbeath, issued a statement indicating that he would not be considered for selection until further information had been received and considered. Robertson subsequently announced his retirement from football. In November 2017, three appeal judges at the Court of Session upheld the ruling. The rapists avoided paying any of the compensation due by declaring bankruptcy.

== Career statistics ==
As of 7 January 2017

Appearances and goals by club, season and competition
Club	Season	League		National cup		League cup		Other		Total	
Club	Season	Apps	Goals	Apps	Goals	Apps	Goals	Apps	Goals	Apps	Goals
Dundee United	2005–06	11	1	0	0	0	0	0	0	11	1
Dundee United	2006–07	26	3	2	1	2	1	0	0	30	5
Dundee United	2007–08	20	6	1	0	4	0	0	0	25	6
Dundee United	2008–09	19	3	2	0	2	0	0	0	23	3
Dundee United	2009–10	14	0	5	1	0	0	0	0	19	1
Dundee United	2010–11	30	4	4	0	2	0	1	0	37	4
Dundee United	Total	120	17	14	2	10	1	1	0	145	20
St Johnstone	2011–12	16	0	2	0	2	0	0	0	20	0
St Johnstone	2012–13	7	2	0	0	2	0	0	0	9	2
St Johnstone	2013–14	0	0	0	0	0	0	0	0	0	0
St Johnstone	Total	23	2	2	0	4	0	0	0	29	2
Greenock Morton	2013–14	16	0	0	0	0	0	0	0	16	0
Livingston	2014–15	13	0	1	0	2	0	3	2	19	2
Ayr United	2015–16	12	1	0	0	0	0	0	0	12	1
Cowdenbeath	2016–17	7	0	1	0	4	0	0	0	12	0
Career total		181	20	18	2	20	1	4	2	233	25

== Honours ==
Dundee United

- Scottish Cup: 2010
- Scottish League Cup: runner-up 2007–08
