= Craig Conway (footballer) =

Scottish footballer (born 1985)

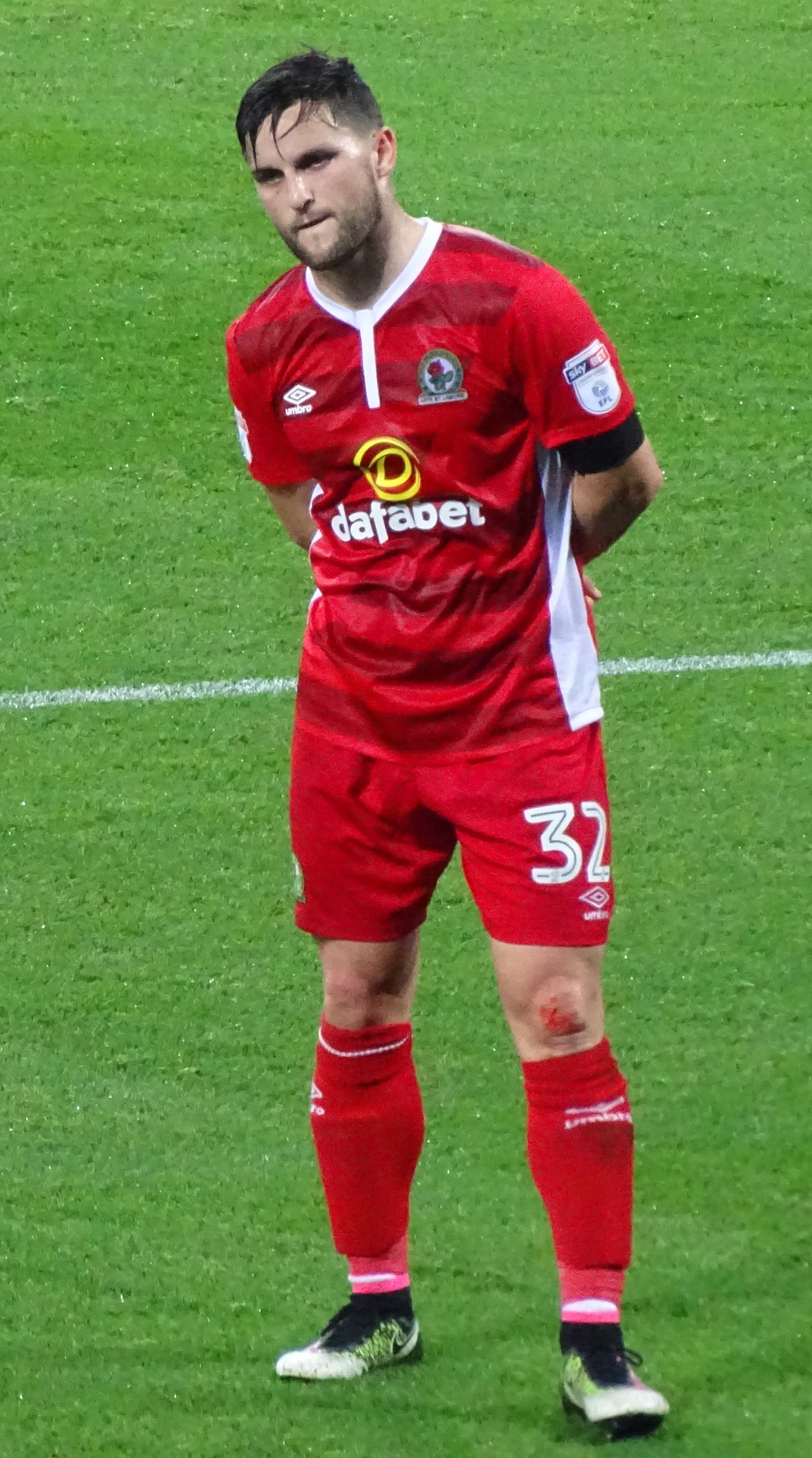
- Conway in 2016

Personal information
- Full name: Craig Ian Conway
- Date of birth: 2 May 1985 (age 41)
- Place of birth: Irvine, Scotland
- Position: Winger

Youth career
- Caledonian Boys Club
- Kilmarnock
- Ayr United

Senior career*
Years	Team	Apps	(Gls)
2003–2006	Ayr United	61	(7)
2006–2011	Dundee United	137	(13)
2011–2014	Cardiff City	58	(5)
2013	→ Brighton & Hove Albion (loan)	13	(1)
2014–2019	Blackburn Rovers	178	(19)
2019–2020	Salford City	20	(0)
2020–2021	St Johnstone	28	(3)
Total		495	(48)

International career
2009–2013	Scotland	7	(0)
- * Club domestic league appearances and goals

Craig Ian Conway (born 2 May 1985) is a Scottish retired professional footballer who played as a winger. He made seven full international appearances for the Scotland national team between 2009 and 2013.

Conway started his career with Ayr United before moving to Scottish Premier League side Dundee United in 2006. Ayr did not receive compensation for the deal until 10 months after he left. In 2011, he moved to Championship side Cardiff on a free transfer. In September 2013, he signed for Brighton & Hove Albion in the English Football League Championship on a three-month loan. In January 2014, Conway joined Championship side Blackburn Rovers on a 2.5-year deal. After leaving Blackburn in 2019, he had a short spell with Salford City, before signing for St Johnstone in 2020.

== Career ==
=== Dundee United ===
Born in Irvine, North Ayrshire, Conway started his career with Caledonian Boys Club in Prestwick. He was signed by Kilmarnock and released before later signing with Ayr United, making 61 league appearances for the club and scoring seven times. Conway's good form alerted then-Dundee United manager Craig Brewster and he agreed a pre-contract deal with Conway to bring him to Tannadice, with the transfer completed on 1 June 2006, with compensation decided ten months later. Largely used as a substitute under Brewster, Conway started the majority of matches under Craig Levein and assisted more goals than any other United player in 2006–07. In February 2007, Conway suffered a broken foot which appeared to end his season prematurely. However, Conway appeared in the final four matches of the season. Although playing at the start of the following season, it transpired that Conway was suffering similar issues and it was discovered that a bone graft was needed, ruling Conway out for the last three months of 2007.

Conway returned to action in 2007–08, playing three matches before being sidelined for four months, returning in December. He scored his first goal for the club a month later in the 2–1 win over Kilmarnock in January and two matches later, scored the third goal in the 4–1 League Cup semi-final win over Aberdeen.

Conway signed a two-year contract extension in September 2008 to extend his time at Tannadice until 2011. On 15 May 2010, Conway scored two goals in a man of the match performance as United beat Ross County 3–0 in the 2010 Scottish Cup Final. In April 2011, United manager Peter Houston indicated that he expected Conway to leave the club at the end of the season, due to the Terrors being unable to match his wage demands. Craig was inducted into the Dundee United Hall of Fame on 23rd October 2023.

=== Cardiff City ===
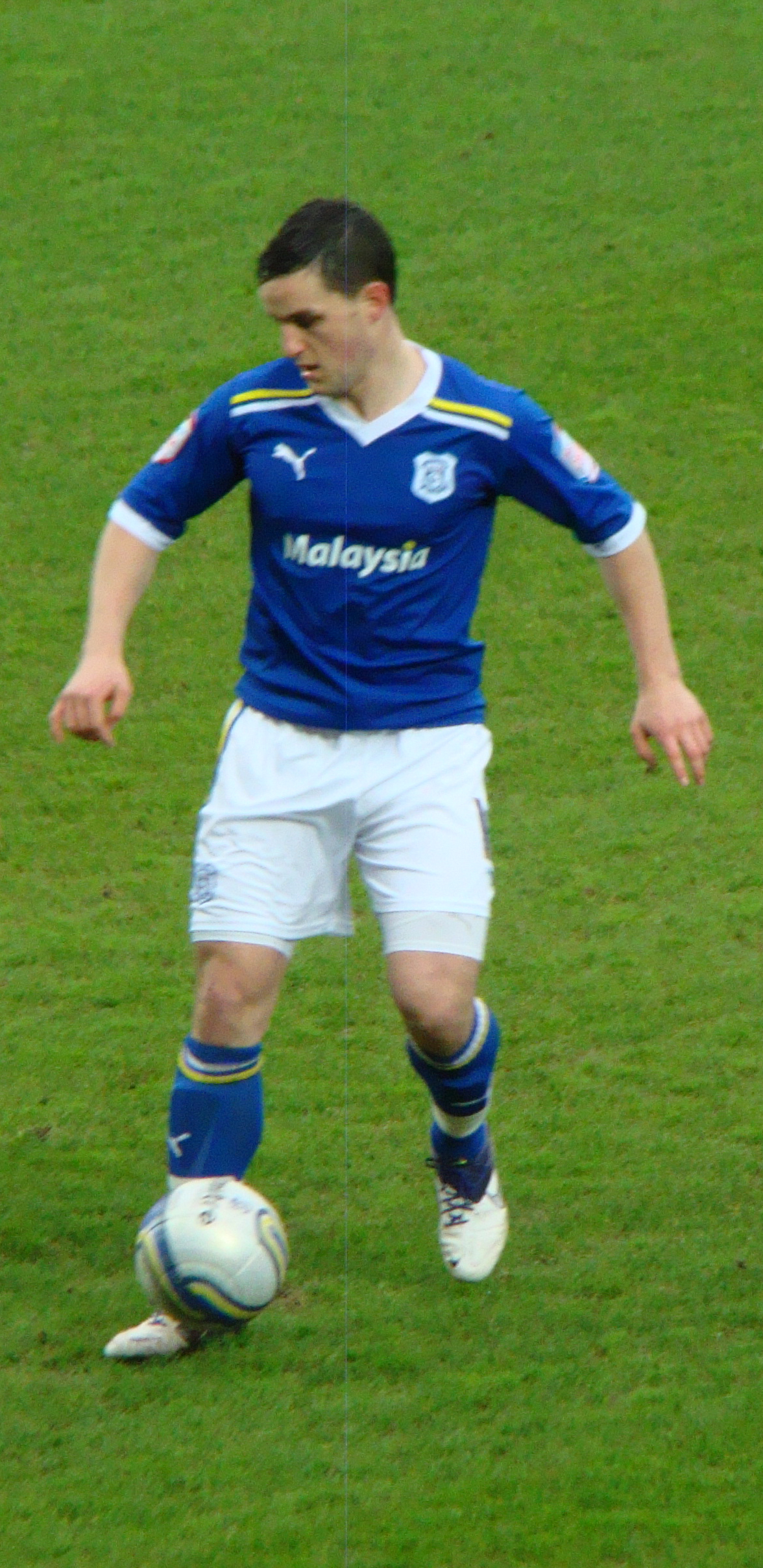
Conway playing for Cardiff City in 2012

On 21 June 2011, Conway confirmed that he had agreed terms with Cardiff City and that he would have a medical within the next couple of days. Conway completed his move and signed a three-year contract with the Bluebirds on 23 June 2011. He made his debut in a 1–0 win over West Ham United on the opening day of the Championship season. Conway scored his first goal for Cardiff the following game against Oxford United in the Football League Cup. He then followed up his goal against Oxford with another goal against Bristol City in the league just four days later. Conway's third came as the winning goal against Huddersfield Town, putting the Bluebirds through to the third round of the League Cup. He made his 250th career appearance in a 2–0 win over Crystal Palace on 5 November. Conway was an unused substitute at Wembley in the League Cup Final. In April 2012, Conway was selected for the match against Watford, but was taken off with 32 minutes played following a tackle made by Jonathan Hogg, which resulted in an ankle injury and ended his season, four games early.

Conway returned in time for pre-season. He made his competitive return on 14 August 2012 against Northampton in a 2–1 League Cup defeat. Following a lack of first team football during the season, Conway put in a transfer request on 23 November 2012 after starting only two games out of his four total appearances. The request was rejected by manager, Malky Mackay. Conway was included in the squad for the next two games following the request and he made an appearance against Derby County. His first goal of the season came on 2 December, where he scored the winner against Sheffield Wednesday, which ensured Cardiff beat their Club record of nine successive home wins. Following a run of successful performances, Conway withdrew his transfer request on 21 December, and went on to play a crucial role in Cardiff's Championship-winning season, including scoring the goal that sealed the title in a 1–1 draw at Turf Moor against Burnley in April.

==== Loan to Brighton & Hove Albion ====
On 13 September 2013, Conway joined Championship side Brighton & Hove Albion on a 93-day short-term loan, running until 14 December 2013. Conway scored his first and only goal in this loan period on 7 December 2013, in the 3–1 victory against Leicester City.

=== Blackburn Rovers ===
On 31 January 2014, Transfer Deadline Day, Conway joined Championship side Blackburn Rovers on a 2 1/2-year deal. Conway scored his first goal for the club on 22 February 2014 in a 1–0 win away against Reading. On 10 December 2015, Conway signed a new deal which will keep him until 2018. After Blackburn were relegated to League One, Conway stayed with Blackburn but was gradually dropped from the starting eleven after suffering multiple injuries and a dip in form.

He entered into talks for a new contract with Blackburn at the end of the 2017–18 season which resulted in him extending his contract by another year with an option for a further twelve months.

On 25 May 2019 Conway confirmed he would be leaving at the end of his current contract after five and a half years at Rovers.

=== Salford City ===
In October 2019, Conway signed for Salford City on a short-term deal. His contract was later extended to the end of the 2019–20 season. He was released by the club on 16 May 2020. He made his début against Walsall, providing the assist for Luke Armstrong to open the scoring in a 3–0 triumph as Salford won away for the first time in the English Football League.

=== St Johnstone ===
On 31 July 2020, Conway signed for Scottish club St Johnstone, on a one-year deal. He scored his first goals for St Johnstone when he scored twice in a 5–3 win over Hamilton Academical on 17 October 2020. Conway played in the February 2021 Scottish League Cup Final against Livingston at Hampden Park on 28 February 2021 as Saints won the trophy for the first time with a 1–0 win. He had previously scored the third goal in the 3–0 semi-final win against Hibernian, also at Hampden. Conway was released by St Johnstone at the end of the 2020–21 season.

=== Retirement ===
Conway announced his retirement in a post on his Instagram account on 18 March 2022.

== International career ==
Conway made his international debut under George Burley on 10 October 2009 against Japan, he started the game but Scotland lost 2–0. It took him two years to make his next appearance for Scotland, which came in the 2011 Nations Cup against Northern Ireland, this time Scotland won 3–0. His third appearance for Scotland was on 11 November 2011 in a 2–1 friendly victory over Cyprus in Larnaca.

Most recently, he was a substitute in the 3–2 friendly loss to England at Wembley in August 2013.

== Career statistics ==
=== Club ===
As of match played 15 May 2021

Club	Season	League			National Cup		League Cup		Other		Total	
Club	Season	Division	Apps	Goals	Apps	Goals	Apps	Goals	Apps	Goals	Apps	Goals
Ayr United	2002–03	Scottish First Division	1	0	0	0	0	0	0	0	1	0
Ayr United	2003–04	Scottish First Division	6	0	1	0	0	0	1 (Note: Appearances in the Scottish Challenge Cup)	0	8	0
Ayr United	2004–05	Scottish Second Division	23	3	3	2	1	0	1	0	28	5
Ayr United	2005–06	Scottish Second Division	31	4	3	0	1	0	0	0	35	4
Ayr United	Total		61	7	7	2	2	0	2	0	72	9
Dundee United	2006–07	Scottish Premier League	30	0	2	0	2	0	—		34	0
Dundee United	2007–08	Scottish Premier League	15	1	2	0	2	1	—		19	2
Dundee United	2008–09	Scottish Premier League	36	5	2	0	4	0	—		42	5
Dundee United	2009–10	Scottish Premier League	33	4	6	2	3	0	—		42	6
Dundee United	2010–11	Scottish Premier League	23	3	4	0	0	0	1 (Note: Appearances in the UEFA Europa League)	0	28	3
Dundee United	Total		137	13	16	2	11	1	1	0	165	16
Cardiff City	2011–12	Championship	31	3	1	0	6	2	—		38	5
Cardiff City	2012–13	Championship	27	2	0	0	1	0	—		28	2
Cardiff City	2013–14	Premier League	0	0	0	0	1	0	—		1	0
Cardiff City	Total		58	5	1	0	8	2	0	0	67	7
Brighton and Hove Albion	2013–14	Championship	13	1	0	0	0	0	—		13	1
Blackburn Rovers	2013–14	Championship	18	4	0	0	0	0	—		18	4
Blackburn Rovers	2014–15	Championship	38	3	5	1	1	0	—		44	4
Blackburn Rovers	2015–16	Championship	35	3	3	0	0	0	—		38	3
Blackburn Rovers	2016–17	Championship	42	6	2	0	2	1	—		46	7
Blackburn Rovers	2017–18	League One	24	2	2	0	1	0	1 (Note: Appearances in the EFL Trophy)	0	28	2
Blackburn Rovers	2018–19	Championship	21	1	2	0	3	1	—		26	2
Blackburn Rovers	Total		178	19	14	1	7	2	1	0	200	22
Salford City	2019–20	League Two	20	0	1	0	0	0	2	0	23	0
St Johnstone	2020–21	Scottish Premiership	28	3	0	0	7	1	—		35	4
Career total			495	48	39	5	35	6	6	0	575	59

=== International appearances ===
Appearances and goals by national team and year
National team	Year	Apps	Goals
Scotland	2009	1	0
Scotland	2011	2	0
Scotland	2013	4	0
Total		7	0

== Honours ==
Dundee United

- Scottish Cup: 2009–10

Cardiff City

- Football League Championship: 2012–13
- Football League Cup runner-up: 2011–12

Blackburn Rovers

- EFL League One runner-up: 2017–18

St Johnstone

- Scottish Cup: 2020–21
- Scottish League Cup: 2020–21
