= Christian Kalvenes =

Norwegian footballer and football executive (born 1977)

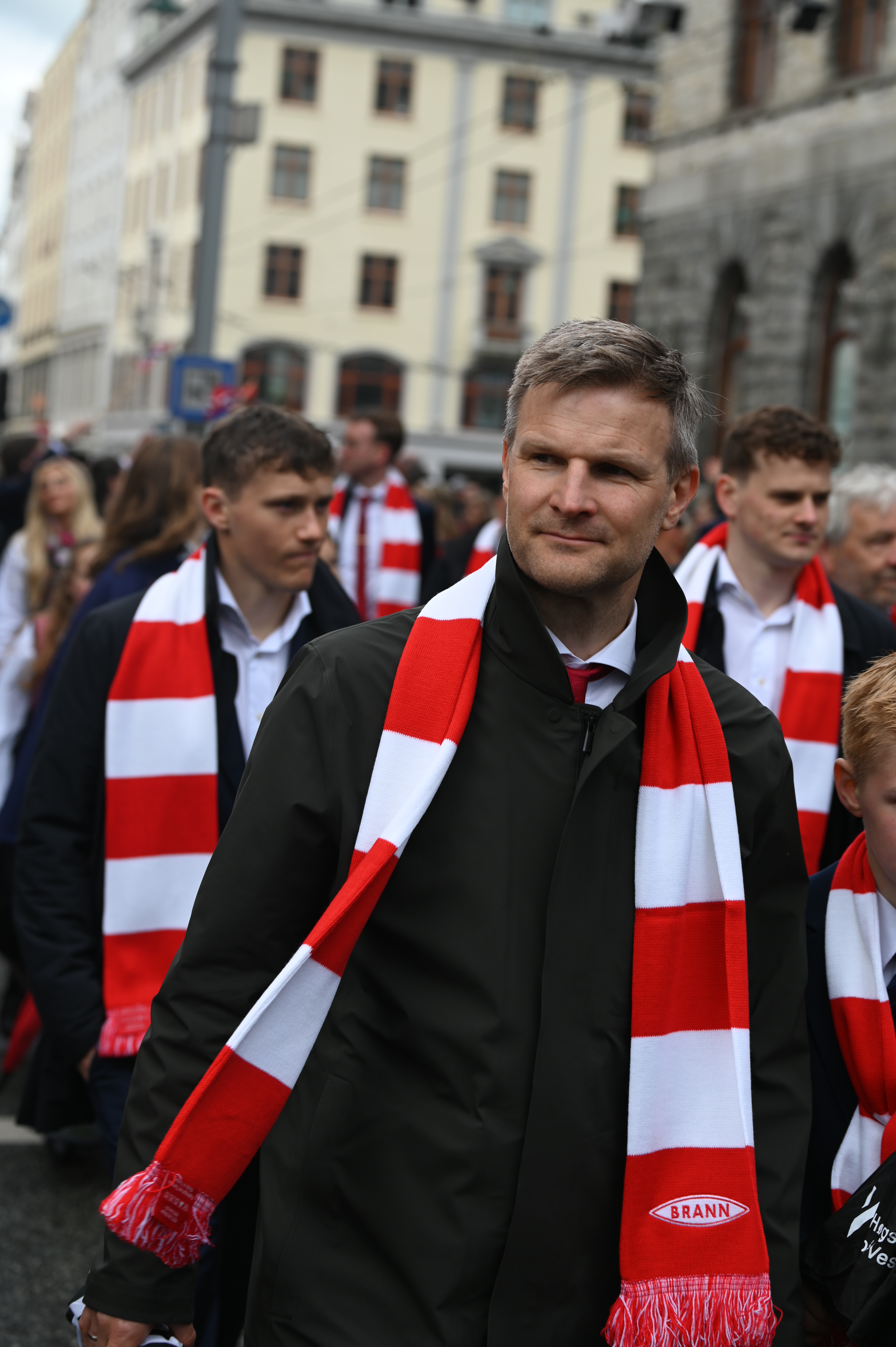

Personal information
- Full name: Christian Kalvenes
- Date of birth: 8 March 1977 (age 49)
- Place of birth: Bergen, Norway
- Height: 6 ft 0 in (1.83 m)
- Positions: Left-back; centre-back

Senior career*
| Years | Team | Apps | (Gls) |
| 1995–1997 | Brann | 1 | (0) |
| 1998–2000 | Åsane | 45 | (4) |
| 2000–2003 | Sogndal | 67 | (4) |
| 2004–2006 | Brann | 11 | (0) |
| 2006–2008 | Dundee United | 48 | (2) |
| 2008–2010 | Burnley | 27 | (1) |
| 2010–2012 | Brann | 33 | (0) |
| Total | | 232 | (11) |
- * Club domestic league appearances and goals

Christian Kalvenes (born 8 March 1977) is a Norwegian former footballer and the managing director of SK Brann, a position he has held since April 2022. As a player, he was a defender who had three spells with Brann between 1995 and 2012, and also played for Åsane and Sogndal in Norway, Dundee United in Scotland, and Burnley in England, helping the latter to promotion to the Premier League in 2009.

== Career ==
=== Norway ===
A left back and central defender, Kalvenes made his senior debut for Brann on 28 May 1995 before establishing himself as a regular first-team player at Sogndal from 2000–2003, making 67 league appearances and scoring four goals. He returned to Brann in the winter of 2004, and made his second league appearance for the club, against FC Lyn Oslo on 29 May 2005, ten years and one day after his first.

=== Dundee United ===
On 2 August 2006, Kalvenes joined Dundee United for a fee of around £50,000. In his competitive debut for United, in the second game of the 2006–07 season, Kalvenes scored the second goal in a 2–2 draw against Rangers at Ibrox. In August 2007, Kalvenes was "harshly sent off" against Kilmarnock, a decision which gave Kilmarnock an "undeserved victory." The red card was later overturned.

In January 2008, it was reported that Kalvenes was likely to leave United at the end of his contract and return to Norway; something the player admitted considering in March, although adding it would be "difficult to walk away" and "tough to leave". Following an injury in mid-April, Kalvenes confirmed he had played his last match for the club, and that he would return to Norway at the end of the season to be closer to his family. In his time at Tannadice Park, Kalvenes made 48 appearances scoring 2 goals.

That was to be his only goal of a season when he established himself as a regular, playing over 30 games for Dundee United. Midway through his second season at Tannadice Park, the left back hinted at a return to Scandinavia in the summer of 2008, when his contract expired. However, he continued to be a regular starter and ended his Dundee United career as he started it, in his penultimate appearance in April 2008 – with a goal against Rangers. And after temporarily shelving immediate plans to raise a family back in Scandinavia, he signed a two-year deal with Burnley in June 2008.

=== Burnley ===
Burnley snapped up Kalvenes on a Bosman transfer in June 2008. His move to Burnley came as a surprise as it was believed that he would be heading back home to Norway, as stated by the player when he left Dundee United at the end of the 2007–2008 season. The 31-year-old Norwegian left full back, pronounced 'Kal-Ven-Es', signed a two-year deal with the Clarets after his contract with the Scottish club expired. He was to play an important role in the Clarets promotion winning campaign, making twenty-one league appearances with his only goal of the season proving to be a vital one. It came in March at Bloomfield Road on a cold, wet Tuesday evening when his late strike secured an important 1–0 victory over Lancashire rivals Blackpool. The marauding left backs' goal against Blackpool proved to be a pivotal moment in the play-off surge by the Lancashire outfit.

He played an important part in helping Burnley gain promotion from the Championship to the English Premier League via the play-offs. On his Premiership debut in August 2009, he became the first Premiership player from the city of Bergen. On 8 April 2010, Kalvenes had his contract terminated by mutual consent.

=== Brann ===
On 14 June 2010 Kalvenes signed for Brann for the third time of his career. He retired after the 2012 season.

=== Outside football ===
Christian Kalvenes holds a Master of Business Administration degree. During his spell at Burnley and Dundee United, he often preached about the importance of pursuing an academic career to High School and College students. Since retiring from football in 2012, he has been an active member in the campaign against bullying for Norwegian schools. He was appointed managing director of SK Brann in April 2022.

== Honours ==
Dundee United

- Scottish League Cup runner-up: 2007–08

Burnley

- Football League Championship play-offs: 2009

== See also ==
- Dundee United F.C. season 2006-07
- Dundee United F.C. season 2007-08
