= Steven Robb =

Scottish footballer

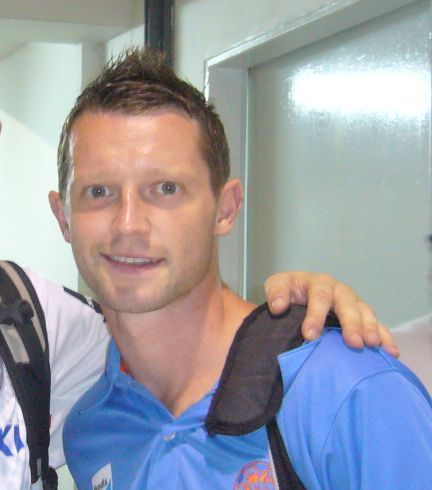
- Robb with Thai Port in 2011

Personal information
- Date of birth: 8 March 1982 (age 44)
- Place of birth: Perth, Scotland
- Position: Winger

Senior career*
Years	Team	Apps	(Gls)
2001–2006	Dundee	83	(0)
2005	→ Raith Rovers (loan)	9	(0)
2006–2008	Dundee United	27	(1)
2008–2010	St Mirren	39	(1)
2011	Dundee (trial)	1	(0)
2011–2013	Thai Port	49	(5)
2013–2014	Brechin City	21	(1)
2014–2015	Montrose	8	(0)
Total		237	(10)
- * Club domestic league appearances and goals

Steven Robb (born 8 March 1982) is a Scottish retired footballer, who played as a left winger. He began his career with Dundee in 2001 before joining Dundee United and then St Mirren. After playing in Thailand for Thai Port, he returned to Scotland with Brechin City and then Montrose. He retired in 2015 at the age of 32, due to injury problems.

== Career ==
Robb started his career in 2001 as a youth team player with Dundee, going on to make over 80 league appearances with a short loan spell with Raith Rovers. At the end of the 2004–2005 season in which Dundee were relegated to the Scottish First Division, Robb decided to stay with Dundee but after failure to gain promotion Robb left the Dees for Dundee's rivals Dundee United in June 2006 on a free transfer. He scored his first and only goal for United in 1-1 draw with Motherwell on 10 March 2007. Robb was told he would be released from Tannadice at the end of the 2007–08 season, with the winger subsequently agreeing a move to St Mirren at the start of the summer transfer window. Robb scored his first goal on his debut in the 7–0 victory over Dumbarton in the League Cup. He scored his first league goal for the club in a 2-1 defeat to Aberdeen in March 2010.

After being released by St Mirren, Robb took a chance moving to Thai side Thai Port.

At the start of the 2013–14 season, Robb returned to Scotland and signed for Brechin City. He scored his first and only goal for Brechin in a 2-1 loss to Rangers.

At the beginning of the 2014–15 season Robb put pen to paper with Montrose. He retired at the end of that season and moved into business with a clothing company alongside fellow retired player Mark Corcoran, taking advantage of personal contacts made in his football career and in the fabric industry in Thailand.

== Statistics ==
Correct at 18 May 2009

Club performance			League		Cup		League Cup		Total	
Season	Club	League	Apps	Goals	Apps	Goals	Apps	Goals	Apps	Goals
Scotland			League		Scottish Cup		League Cup		Total	
2001–02	Dundee	Premier League	1	0	-		-		1	0
2002–03	Dundee	Premier League	9	0	-		1	0	10	0
2003–04	Raith Rovers	First Division	9	0	-		-		9	0
2003–04	Dundee	Premier League	15	0	2	1	-		17	1
2004–05	Dundee	Premier League	33	2	1	0	1	1	35	3
2005–06	Dundee	First Division	25	0	3	0	1	0	29	0
2006–07	Dundee United	Premier League	15	1	-		2	0	17	1
2007–08	Dundee United	Premier League	12	0	-		1	0	13	0
2008–09	St Mirren	Premier League	16	0	2	0	2	1	20	1
Career total			135	3	8	1	8	2	151	6
