= Ross Gardiner =

Scottish footballer

Personal information
- Full name: Ross John Gardiner
- Date of birth: 30 December 1986 (age 39)
- Place of birth: Bellshill, Scotland
- Position: Defender

Youth career
- 2000–2004: Dundee United

Senior career*
Years	Team	Apps	(Gls)
2001–2007	Dundee United	4	(0)
2006–2007	→ Arbroath (loan)	4	(0)
2007–2008	Montrose	32	(1)
2008 –	Bentleigh Greens	?	(0)

International career
2004	Scotland U18	4	(0)
- * Club domestic league appearances and goals as of 11:11, 17 August 2008 (UTC)

Ross John Gardiner (born 30 December 1986) is a Scottish footballer who plays in central defence/left back and is currently not signed.

== Career ==
Gardiner was born in Bellshill, North Lanarkshire, but grew up in the Aberdeen area (his father John was also a footballer who played as a goalkeeper, and then managed teams in the Highland League). He trained with Aberdeen prior to joining Dundee United's youth system, initially as an under-14 player. After turning professional in 2003, Gardiner became a regular in United's U21 youth team and subsequently the reserve side. Having previously been listed as a substitute for the first team, he was given his debut in an SPL match away to Inverness Caledonian Thistle in April 2006. Gardiner was released from the club in May 2007 and joined Montrose in time for the 2007–08 season, leaving the club two years later. Gardiner then moved to Australia to play for Bentleigh Greens, however he returned home due to injury at the end of the season.
