= Barry Callaghan (footballer) =

Scottish footballer

Personal information
- Full name: Barry Callaghan
- Date of birth: 30 November 1986 (age 39)
- Place of birth: Glasgow, Scotland
- Height: 5 ft 8 in (1.73 m)
- Position: Midfielder

Senior career*
| Years | Team | Apps | (Gls) |
| 2003–2007 | Dundee United | 1 | (0) |
| 2006–2007 | → Queen of South (loan) | 8 | (0) |
| 2007–2008 | Brechin City | 2 | (0) |
- * Club domestic league appearances and goals as of 1 July 2008

Barry Callaghan (born 30 November 1986, in Glasgow) is a Scottish footballer who played as a midfielder. He played for Dundee United and Brechin City, and also for Queen of the South on loan.

== Career ==
Callaghan began his career with Dundee United and was given his only senior appearance for the club by then-manager Ian McCall in March 2005, as a substitute against Aberdeen. In August 2006, Callaghan joined Queen of the South, where McCall was now manager, on a six-month loan transfer. Dundee United announced that he, along with Gregg Burnett, would be leaving at the end of the 2006–07 season. Callaghan signed for Brechin in June 2007 but was released in May 2008, having made the last of his four appearances in September 2007.

== Career statistics ==
| Club | Season | League | | Cup | | Lg Cup | | Other | | Total | |
| Club | Season | Apps | Goals | Apps | Goals | Apps | Goals | Apps | Goals | Apps | Goals |
|---|---|---|---|---|---|---|---|---|---|---|---|
| Dundee United | 2004–05 | 1 | 0 | 0 | 0 | 0 | 0 | 0 | 0 | 1 | 0 |
| Dundee United | Total | 1 | 0 | 0 | 0 | 0 | 0 | 0 | 0 | 1 | 0 |
| Queen of the South (loan) | 2006–07 | 8 | 0 | 0 | 0 | 0 | 0 | 1 | 0 | 9 | 0 |
| Queen of the South (loan) | Total | 8 | 0 | 0 | 0 | 0 | 0 | 1 | 0 | 9 | 0 |
| Brechin City | 2007–08 | 2 | 0 | 0 | 0 | 1 | 0 | 1 | 0 | 4 | 0 |
| Brechin City | Total | 2 | 0 | 0 | 0 | 1 | 0 | 1 | 0 | 4 | 0 |
| Career total | | 11 | 0 | 0 | 0 | 1 | 0 | 2 | 0 | 14 | 0 |
