= Greg Cameron =

Scottish footballer

Personal information
- Full name: Greg Cameron
- Date of birth: 10 April 1988 (age 38)
- Place of birth: Dundee, Scotland
- Position: Defensive midfielder

Youth career
- 2003–2004: Dundee United

Senior career*
Years	Team	Apps	(Gls)
2004–2010	Dundee United	34	(2)
2007	→ Partick Thistle (loan)	3	(0)
2008	→ St Johnstone (loan)	5	(0)
2009	→ Shamrock Rovers (loan)	14	(0)
2009	→ Raith Rovers (loan)	2	(0)
2013–2015	Brechin City	34	(0)
2015	→ Montrose (loan)	10	(0)
2015–2016	Montrose	0	(0)

International career
2006	Scotland U19	1	(0)
2007	Scotland U20	2	(0)
2007–2008	Scotland U21	3	(0)
- * Club domestic league appearances and goals

Greg Cameron (born 10 April 1988) is a Scottish footballer who last played for Montrose. He previously played for Dundee United between 2004 and 2010, from where he had loan spells with Partick Thistle, St Johnstone, Shamrock Rovers and Raith Rovers. He then played for Brechin City before joining Montrose, initially on loan. He has represented Scotland up to an under-21 level.

== Domestic career ==
Cameron progressed through the Dundee United youth program, making his début midway through the 2004–05 season. In October 2006, his progress saw him sign a new contract, taking him up with the same team until 2010.

In late October 2007, having played twice for United weeks earlier, Cameron joined Partick Thistle on a month's loan, reuniting him with former manager Ian McCall. After playing three league matches, Cameron returned to Tannadice, moving on loan to St Johnstone in January 2008. After just six games, however, Cameron suffered a knee injury, ending his season. Featuring just three times for Dundee United in the 2007–08 season, Cameron failed to feature in any first team match day squad in 2008–09 and was sent on loan to Shamrock Rovers until June. With one year of his contract remaining, Cameron returned to United. He joined Notts County on trial in August, but it failed to lead to a complete move.

In June 2013, Cameron signed for Brechin City.
