= 2011–12 Dundee United F.C. season =

Dundee United
2011–12 season
- Chairman: Stephen Thompson
- Manager: Peter Houston
- Stadium: Tannadice Park
- SPL: 4th
- Scottish Cup: Quarter-finals, lost to Celtic
- League Cup: Quarter-finals, lost to Falkirk
- Europa League: Second qualifying round, lost to Śląsk Wrocław
- Top goalscorer: League: Jon Daly (19); All: Jon Daly (22)
- Highest home attendance: 11,471 v Aberdeen, 2 January 2012
- Lowest home attendance: 5,232 v Kilmarnock, 21 February 2012
- Average home league attendance: 7,482
Home colours	Away colours

The 2011–12 season was the club's 103rd season, having been founded as Dundee Hibernian in 1909. Dundee United competed in the Scottish Premier League, Europa League, Scottish Cup and the League Cup.

== Results and fixtures ==
Win Draw Loss

=== Preseason ===
26 June 2011 Friendly	(Republic of Ireland) Drogheda United	1– 2	Dundee United	Hunky Dorys Park, Drogheda
	White 30'	DUFC Report	Russell 20'; Goodwillie 84'

28 June 2011 Friendly	(Republic of Ireland) Bohemian	1–1	Dundee United	Dalymount Park, Dublin
	Burke 56'	DUFC Report	Kenneth 9'

2 July 2011 Friendly	Forfar Athletic	0–2	Dundee United	Station Park, Forfar
		DUFC Report	Bishop 33' (o.g.); Russell 64'	Attendance: 957; Referee: Craig Charleston

5 July 2011 Friendly (Closed-doors)	Falkirk	2–5	Dundee United	Falkirk Stadium, Falkirk
	Higginbotham 80'; Trialist 82'	Falkirk FC Report	Watson 10' 22' 45'; Goodwillie 14'; Russell 16'

9 July 2011 Keyline Challenge Cup Tournament	Alloa Athletic	1–0	Dundee United	Mossfield Stadium, Oban
		DUFC Report

9 July 2011 Keyline Challenge Cup Tournament	Dundee United	2–0	St Johnstone	Mossfield Stadium, Oban
		DUFC Report

9 July 2011 Keyline Challenge Cup Tournament	Dundee United	2–1	Heart of Midlothian	Mossfield Stadium, Oban
		DUFC Report

9 July 2011 Keyline Challenge Cup Tournament	Oban Saints	0–1	Dundee United	Mossfield Stadium, Oban
		DUFC Report

9 July 2011 Keyline Challenge Cup Tournament	Dundee United	1–1	Hamilton Accidemical	Mossfield Stadium, Oban
		DUFC Report

=== Scottish Premier League ===
24 July 2011 1	Dundee United	1–1	Kilmarnock	Tannadice Park, Dundee
	Swanson 70'	BBC Sport	McKeown 46'	Attendance: 6,232; Referee: Alan Muir

31 July 2011 2	Heart of Midlothian	0–1	Dundee United	Tynecastle Stadium, Edinburgh
		BBC Sport	Daly 39'	Attendance: 13,821; Referee: Winter

6 August 2011 3	Dundee United	1–1	St Mirren	Tannadice Park, Dundee
	Daly 67'	BBC Sport	Thompson 11'	Attendance: 6,594; Referee: Allan

13 August 2011 4	Celtic	5–1	Dundee United	Celtic Park, Glasgow
	Stokes 4'; Hooper 33'; Ki 58'; Ledley 71'; Forrest 90+1'	BBC Sport	Russell 31'	Attendance: 50,589; Referee: Thomson

20 August 2011 5	Dundee United	0–1	Dunfermline Athletic	Tannadice Park, Dundee
		BBC Sport	Burns 85'	Attendance: 6,527; Referee: O'Reilly

27 August 2011 6	St Johnstone	3–3	Dundee United	McDiarmid Park
	Sandaza 34' (pen.), 45'; Craig 37'	BBC Report	Douglas 2'; Mackay-Steven 80'; Gunning 83'	Attendance: 4,480; Referee: Richmond

10 September 2011 7	Dundee United	0–1	Rangers	Tannadice Park, Dundee
	Russell (red card) 30'	BBC Sport	Lafferty 61'	Attendance: 10,156; Referee: Murray

17 September 2011 8	Dundee United	3–1	Inverness	Tannadice Park, Dundee
	Dalla Valle 13'; Swanson 43'; Daly 71'	BBC Sport	Ross 16'	Attendance: 6,497; Referee: Conroy

24 September 2011 9	Hibernian	3–3	Dundee United	Easter Road, Edinburgh
	O'Connor 22'; Robertson 72' (o.g.); Agogo 74'	BBC Sport	Daly 28', 68'; Swanson 33'	Attendance: 9,360; Referee: Brian Winter

1 October 2011 10	Dundee United	1–3	Motherwell	Tannadice Park, Dundee
	Daly 77'	BBC Sport	Lasley 14'; Higdon 45', 64' (pen.)	Attendance: 6,073; Referee: McLean

15 October 2011 11	Aberdeen	3–1	Dundee United	Pittodrie Stadium, Aberdeen
	Árnason 14'; Mawéné 51'; Considine 60'	BBC Sport	Dalla Valle 79'	Attendance: 10,256; Referee: Collum

22 October 2011 12	Dundee United	0–0	St Johnstone	Tannadice Park, Dundee
		BBC Sport		Attendance: 6,707; Referee: Muir

29 October 2011 13	Dunfermline Athletic	1–4	Dundee United	East End Park, Dunfermline
	Mason (red card) 26'; Kirk 55'	BBC Sport	Dixon 13'; Dalla Valle 18'; Russell 75'; Mackay-Steven 82'	Attendance: 3,979; Referee: O'Reilly

5 November 2011 14	Rangers	3–1	Dundee United	Ibrox Stadium, Glasgow
	Jelavić 19', 63' (pen.); Kenneth 82' (o.g.); Wylde (red card) 90'	BBC Sport	Daly 73'	Attendance: 45,600; Referee: Winter

19 November 2011 15	Dundee United	1–0	Heart of Midlothian	Tannadice Park, Dundee
	Robertson 24'	BBC Report		Attendance: 6,925; Referee: Collum

26 November 2011 16	Motherwell	0–0	Dundee United	Fir Park, Motherwell
		BBC Sport		Attendance: 4,487; Referee: Brines

4 December 2011 17	Dundee United	0–1	Celtic	Tannadice Park, Dundee
		BBC Sport	Hooper 12'	Attendance: 10,980; Referee: Thomson

10 December 2011 18	Inverness Caledonian Thistle	2–3	Dundee United	Caledonian Stadium, Inverness
	Hayes 2'; McKay 47'; Davis (yellow card) 82' (yellow-red card)	BBC Sport	Russell 51', 78'; Golobart 64' (o.g.)	Attendance: 3,142; Referee: McLean

17 December 2011 19	Kilmarnock	1–1	Dundee United	Rugby Park, Kilmarnock
	Dayton 51'	BBC Sport	Dixon 90+1'	Attendance: 4,007; Referee: Collum

24 December 2011 20	Dundee United	3–1	Hibernian	Tannadice Park, Dundee
	Russell 59'; Daly 76', 88'	BBC Sport	Griffiths 23'	Attendance: 8,168; Referee: O'Reilly

28 December 2011 21	St Mirren	2–2	Dundee United	St Mirren Park, Paisley
	Thompson 27'; Carey 32'	BBC Sport	Daly 31'; Armstrong 35'	Attendance: 3,811; Referee: Thomson

2 January 2012 22	Dundee United	1–2	Aberdeen	Tannadice Park, Dundee
	Daly 6'	BBC Sport	Chalali 67'; Árnason 86'	Attendance: 11,471; Referee: McLean

14 January 2012 23	Celtic	2–1	Dundee United	Celtic Park, Glasgow
	Hooper 12'; Wanyama 17'	BBC Sport	Rankin 50'	Attendance: 50,139; Referee: Winter

21 January 2012 24	Dundee United	1–1	Motherwell	Tannadice Park, Dundee
	Craigan 28' (o.g.)	BBC Sport	Higdon 85'	Attendance: 5,969; Referee: O'Reilly

11 February 2012 25	St Johnstone	1–5	Dundee United	McDiarmid Park, Perth
	Anderson 66'	BBC Sport	Anderson 35' (Own goal); Davidson 61' (Own goal); Russell 84'; Daly 89'; Lacny 90'	Attendance: 4,319; Referee: Brines

18 February 2012 26	Dundee United	0–0	St Mirren	Tannadice Park, Dundee
		BBC Sport		Attendance: 6,363; Referee: Winter

21 February 2012 27	Dundee United	4–0	Kilmarnock	Tannadice Park, Dundee
	Daly 56' (Penalty); Dixon 58'; Rankin 70'; Robertson 84'	BBC Sport	Kelly (red card) 55'	Attendance: 5,232; Referee: Thomson

25 February 2012 28	Heart of Midlothian	0–2	Dundee United	Tynecastle Stadium, Edinburgh
		BBC Report	Daly 41'; Gunning 85'	Attendance: 13,176; Referee: Murray

5 March 2012 29	Dundee United	3–0	Inverness Caledonian Thistle	Tannadice Park, Dundee
	Rankin 15'; Robertson 52'; Russell 78'	BBC Sport		Attendance: 5,994; Referee: Muir

17 March 2012 30	Dundee United	2–1	Rangers	Tannadice Park, Dundee
	Watson 37'; Daly 47'	BBC Sport	Rankin 60' (Own goal)	Attendance: 9,464; Referee: Winter

24 March 2012 31	Hibernian	0–2	Dundee United	Easter Road, Edinburgh
		BBC Sport	Russell 66'; Mackay-Steven 73'	Attendance: 9,161; Referee: Salmond

31 March 2012 32	Dundee United	3–0	Dunfermline Athletic	Tannadice Park, Dundee
	Daly 49', 83'; Robertson 80'	BBC Sport		Attendance: 6,654; Referee: Beaton

7 April 2012 33	Aberdeen	3–1	Dundee United	Pittodrie Stadium, Aberdeen
	Mackie 12'; Clark 68'; Jack 78'	BBC Sport	Daly 29'	Attendance: 8,439; Referee: Murray

21 April 2012 34	St Johnstone	0–2	Dundee United	McDiarmid Park, Perth
	Sandaza (yellow card) 57' (yellow-red card)	BBC Sport	Robertson 32'; Rankin 90'	Attendance: 5,826; Referee: Norris

28 April 2012 35	Dundee United	2–2	Heart of Midlothian	Tannadice Park, Dundee
	Flood 32'; Mackay-Steven 65'	BBC Report	Rudi Skácel 35'; Novikovas 83'	Attendance: 7,001; Referee: Collum

2 May 2012 36	Rangers	5–0	Dundee United	Ibrox Stadium, Glasgow
	Whittaker 6'; Aluko 17', 20'; Ness 57'; Bedoya 84'	BBC Sport		Attendance: 43,383; Referee: Muir

6 May 2012 37	Dundee United	1–0	Celtic	Tannadice Park, Dundee
	Robertson 21'	BBC Sport		Attendance: 9,144; Referee: Brines

13 May 2012 38	Motherwell	0–2	Dundee United	Fir Park, Motherwell
		BBC Sport	Russell 8'; Daly 82'	Attendance: 7,456; Referee: Norris

=== Scottish League Cup ===
20 September 2011 Third round	Airdrie United	0–2	Dundee United	Excelsior Stadium, Airdrie
		BBC Sport	Dow 11'; Daly 76'	Attendance: 1,252; Referee: Madden

25 October 2011 Quarter-finals	Dundee United	2–2 (a.e.t.)	Falkirk	Tannadice Park, Dundee
	Russell 73'; Daly 96'	BBC Report	El Alagui 70'; Graham 118'	Attendance: 4,188; Referee: Murray

=== Scottish Cup ===
7 January 2012 Fourth round	Airdrie United	2–6	Dundee United	Excelsior Stadium, Airdrie
	Donnelly 85', 90+2'	BBC Sport	Rankin 17'; Robertson 43'; Russell 62', 68', 84'; Mackay-Steven 71'	Attendance: 2,434; Referee: Charleston

5 February 2012 Fifth round	Rangers	0–2	Dundee United	Ibrox Stadium, Glasgow
		BBC Sport	Gunning 16'; Russell 35'	Attendance: 17,822; Referee: Collum

11 March 2012 Quarter-finals	Dundee United	0–4	Celtic	Tannadice Park, Dundee
	Neilson (yellow card) 28' (red card)	BBC Sport	Ledley 53'; Samaras 71'; Stokes 86'; Brown 90' (pen.)	Attendance: 12,270; Referee: Brines

=== UEFA Europa League ===
14 July 2011 Second qualifying round 1st leg	(Poland) Śląsk Wrocław	1–0	Dundee United	Stadion Oporowska
	Voskamp 75'	BBC Sport		Attendance: 8,000; Referee: Hagen

21 July 2011 Second qualifying round 2nd leg	Dundee United	3–2 (3–3 agg.)	(Poland) Śląsk Wrocław	Tannadice Park
	Watson 2'; Goodwillie 5'; Daly 44' (pen.)	BBC Sport	Elsner 15'; Dudek 75'	Attendance: 11,306; Referee: Lahoz

== Player statistics ==
=== Captains ===
No.	P	Name	Country	No. games	Notes
9	FW	Jon Daly	(Republic of Ireland)	43	Club captain

Last updated: 14 May 2012
Source: Competitive match reports.
Competitive matches only
Matches started as captain only
Country: FIFA nationality; No.: Squad number; P: Position; Name: Player name; No. Games: Number of games started as captain.

=== Squad information ===
Last updated 14 May 2012

No.	Pos	Nat	Player	Total		SPL		Scottish Cup		League Cup		Europa League	
No.	Pos	Nat	Player	Apps	Goals	Apps	Goals	Apps	Goals	Apps	Goals	Apps	Goals
1	GK	(Slovakia) SVK	Dušan Perniš	45	0	38+0	0	3+0	0	2+0	0	2+0	0
2	DF	(Republic of Ireland) IRL	Sean Dillon	33	0	26+2	0	2+1	0	0+0	0	2+0	0
3	DF	(Scotland) SCO	Paul Dixon	44	3	37+0	3	3+0	0	2+0	0	2+0	0
4	DF	(Scotland) SCO	Scott Severin	4	0	2+0	0	0+0	0	0+0	0	2+0	0
5	DF	(Scotland) SCO	Garry Kenneth	31	0	21+4	0	2+1	0	2+0	0	1+0	0
6	MF	(Republic of Ireland) IRL	Willo Flood	39	1	30+2	1	2+1	0	2+0	0	2+0	0
7	FW	(Scotland) SCO	David Goodwillie	3	1	1+0	0	0+0	0	0+0	0	2+0	1
7	MF	(Republic of Ireland) IRL	Richie Ryan	15	0	2+12	0	0+1	0	0+0	0	0+0	0
8	MF	(Scotland) SCO	Scott Robertson	41	8	34+3	7	3+0	1	1+0	0	0+0	0
9	FW	(Republic of Ireland) IRL	Jon Daly	43	22	35+1	19	3+0	0	1+1	2	2+0	1
10	MF	(Scotland) SCO	Danny Swanson	16	3	6+8	3	0+0	0	1+0	0	0+1	0
11	MF	(Scotland) SCO	John Rankin	45	5	38+0	4	3+0	1	2+0	0	2+0	0
12	DF	(Scotland) SCO	Keith Watson	20	2	14+3	1	0+0	0	1+0	0	2+0	1
13	GK	(England) ENG	Steve Banks	0	0	0+0	0	0+0	0	0+0	0	0+0	0
14	DF	(Scotland) SCO	Barry Douglas	14	1	5+5	1	0+1	0	2+0	0	1+0	0
15	FW	(Scotland) SCO	Johnny Russell	43	14	33+4	9	3+0	4	0+1	1	2+0	0
16	MF	(Scotland) SCO	Stuart Armstrong	28	1	12+11	1	2+1	0	1+1	0	0+0	0
17	MF	(Scotland) SCO	Gary Mackay-Steven	36	5	24+7	4	3+0	1	0+1	0	0+1	0
18	DF	(Republic of Ireland) IRL	Gavin Gunning	35	2	29+2	1	2+0	1	2+0	0	0+0	0
19	FW	(Finland) FIN	Lauri Dalla Valle	15	3	6+6	3	1+0	0	2+0	0	0+0	0
20	MF	(Scotland) SCO	Scott Allan	9	0	4+4	0	0+0	0	0+0	0	0+1	0
20	FW	(Czech Republic) CZE	Miloš Lačný	6	1	0+4	1	0+2	0	0+0	0	0+0	0
21	GK	(Slovakia) SVK	Filip Mentel	0	0	0+0	0	0+0	0	0+0	0	0+0	0
22	FW	(Scotland) SCO	Ryan Dow	11	1	3+7	0	0+0	0	1+0	1	0+0	0
23	FW	(Scotland) SCO	Dale Hilson	0	0	0+0	0	0+0	0	0+0	0	0+0	0
24	DF	(Scotland) SCO	Ross Smith	0	0	0+0	0	0+0	0	0+0	0	0+0	0
25	GK	(Scotland) SCO	Marc McCallum	0	0	0+0	0	0+0	0	0+0	0	0+0	0
26	MF	(England) ENG	Keanu Marsh-Brown	1	0	1+0	0	0+0	0	0+0	0	0+0	0
26	DF	(Scotland) SCO	Robbie Neilson	23	0	21+0	0	2+0	0	0+0	0	0+0	0
46	MF	(Scotland) SCO	Ryan Gauld	1	0	0+1	0	0+0	0	0+0	0	0+0	0

=== Disciplinary record ===
Includes all competitive matches.

Last updated 14 May 2012

Number	Nation	Position	Name	Scottish Premier League		Scottish Cup		League Cup		Europa League		Total	
Number	Nation	Position	Name	Yellow card	Red card	Yellow card	Red card	Yellow card	Red card	Yellow card	Red card	Yellow card	Red card
1	(Slovakia)	GK	Dušan Perniš	0	0	0	0	0	0	0	0	0	0
2	(Republic of Ireland)	DF	Sean Dillon	3	0	0	0	0	0	0	0	3	0
3	(Scotland)	DF	Paul Dixon	7	0	0	0	0	0	2	0	9	0
4	(Scotland)	DF	Scott Severin	0	0	0	0	0	0	0	0	0	0
5	(Scotland)	DF	Garry Kenneth	3	0	1	0	0	0	0	0	4	0
6	(Republic of Ireland)	MF	Willo Flood	5	0	0	0	0	0	2	0	7	0
7	(Scotland)	FW	David Goodwillie	0	0	0	0	0	0	0	0	0	0
7	(Republic of Ireland)	MF	Richie Ryan	1	0	0	0	0	0	0	0	1	0
8	(Scotland)	MF	Scott Robertson	2	0	0	0	0	0	0	0	2	0
9	(Republic of Ireland)	FW	Jon Daly	3	0	1	0	1	0	0	0	5	0
10	(Scotland)	MF	Danny Swanson	2	0	0	0	0	0	0	0	2	0
11	(Scotland)	MF	John Rankin	5	0	0	0	0	0	0	0	5	0
12	(Scotland)	DF	Keith Watson	3	0	0	0	0	0	0	0	3	0
13	(England)	GK	Steve Banks	0	0	0	0	0	0	0	0	0	0
14	(Scotland)	DF	Barry Douglas	0	0	0	0	1	0	0	0	1	0
15	(Scotland)	FW	Johnny Russell	2	1	1	0	0	0	1	0	4	1
16	(Scotland)	MF	Stuart Armstrong	0	0	0	0	0	0	0	0	0	0
17	(Scotland)	MF	Gary Mackay-Steven	3	0	1	0	0	0	0	0	4	0
18	(Republic of Ireland)	DF	Gavin Gunning	2	0	0	0	0	0	0	0	2	0
19	(Finland)	FW	Lauri Dalla Valle	1	0	0	0	1	0	0	0	2	0
20	(Scotland)	MF	Scott Allan	0	0	0	0	0	0	0	0	0	0
20	(Czech Republic)	FW	Miloš Lačný	0	0	1	0	0	0	0	0	1	0
21	(Slovakia)	GK	Filip Mentel	0	0	0	0	0	0	0	0	0	0
22	(Scotland)	FW	Ryan Dow	0	0	0	0	0	0	0	0	0	0
23	(Scotland)	FW	Dale Hilson	0	0	0	0	0	0	0	0	0	0
24	(Scotland)	DF	Ross Smith	0	0	0	0	0	0	0	0	0	0
25	(Scotland)	GK	Marc McCallum	0	0	0	0	0	0	0	0	0	0
26	(England)	MF	Keanu Marsh-Brown	0	0	0	0	0	0	0	0	0	0
26	(Scotland)	DF	Robbie Neilson	4	0	2	1	0	0	0	0	6	1
46	(Scotland)	MF	Ryan Gauld	0	0	0	0	0	0	0	0	0	0

== Team statistics ==
=== League table ===
Pos	Team	Pld	W	D	L	GF	GA	GD	Pts	Qualification or relegation
2	Rangers (D, R)	38	26	5	7	77	28	+49	73	Refused SPL admission, accepted into the Third Division and disqualified from the Champions League third qualifying round (Note: Rangers were deducted 10 points for entering administration. As Rangers did not exit administration by 31 March, they were ineligible to compete in Europe in the 2012–13 season. Rangers were unable to agree a CVA with their creditors and the company entered proceedings to be liquidated. After a new company took over, Rangers were denied continued SPL membership and ended up in the 2012–13 Scottish Third Division in time for the start of the season.)
3	Motherwell	38	18	8	12	49	44	+5	62	Qualification for the Champions League third qualifying round
4	Dundee United	38	16	11	11	62	50	+12	59	Qualification for the Europa League third qualifying round
5	Heart of Midlothian	38	15	7	16	45	43	+2	52	Qualification for the Europa League play-off round (Note: Hearts qualified for the Europa League as 2011–12 Scottish Cup winners. Since they finished fifth in the league, the sixth-placed team, St Johnstone, also qualified for the Europa League.)
6	St Johnstone	38	14	8	16	43	50	−7	50	Qualification for the Europa League second qualifying round

Source: SPFL Archive
Rules for classification: 1) points; 2) goal difference; 3) number of goals scored.
(D) Disqualified; (R) Relegated

=== Division summary ===
Round	1	2	3	4	5	6	7	8	9	10	11	12	13	14	15	16	17	18	19	20	21	22	23	24	25	26	27	28	29	30	31	32	33	34	35	36	37	38
Ground	H	A	H	A	H	A	H	H	A	H	A	H	A	A	H	A	H	A	A	H	A	H	A	H	A	H	H	A	H	H	A	H	A	A	H	A	H	A
Result	D	W	D	L	L	D	L	W	D	L	L	D	W	L	W	D	L	W	D	W	D	L	L	D	W	D	W	W	W	W	W	W	L	W	D	L	W	W
Position	3	3	1	6	7	7	9	8	7	8	9	10	8	8	7	7	8	7	7	6	6	6	7	6	6	7	6	5	4	4	4	4	5	4	4	4	4	4

Updated to match(es) played on 14 May 2012. Source: Statto.com
A = Away; H = Home; W = Win; D = Draw; L = Loss

== Transfers ==
=== Players In ===
Player	From	Fee
John Rankin	Hibernian	Free
Willo Flood	Middlesbrough	Free
Gary Mackay-Steven	Airdrie United	Free
Gavin Gunning	Blackburn Rovers	Free
Lauri Dalla Valle	Fulham	Loan
Keanu Marsh-Brown	Fulham	Loan
Robbie Neilson	Leicester City	Free
Richie Ryan	Sligo Rovers	Free
Miloš Lačný	Sparta Prague	Loan

=== Players Out ===
Player	To	Fee
David Robertson	St Johnstone	Free
Morgaro Gomis	Birmingham City	Free
Prince Buaben	Watford	Free
Craig Conway	Cardiff City	Free
Andis Shala	Hallescher FC	Free
Darren Dods	Falkirk	Free
Ryan McCord	Alloa Athletic	Free
Ross McCord	Alloa Athletic	Free
Kris Irvine	Clyde	Free
Filip Mentel	Clyde	Loan
David Goodwillie	Blackburn Rovers	£2,000,000
Jordan Elfverson	Arbroath	Free
Dale Hilson	Forfar Athletic	Loan
Marc McCallum	Forfar Athletic	Loan
Scott Allan	West Bromwich Albion	Undisclosed
Ross Smith	Peterhead	Loan
Scott Severin		Retired
