= Gavin Gunning =

Irish footballer (born 1991)

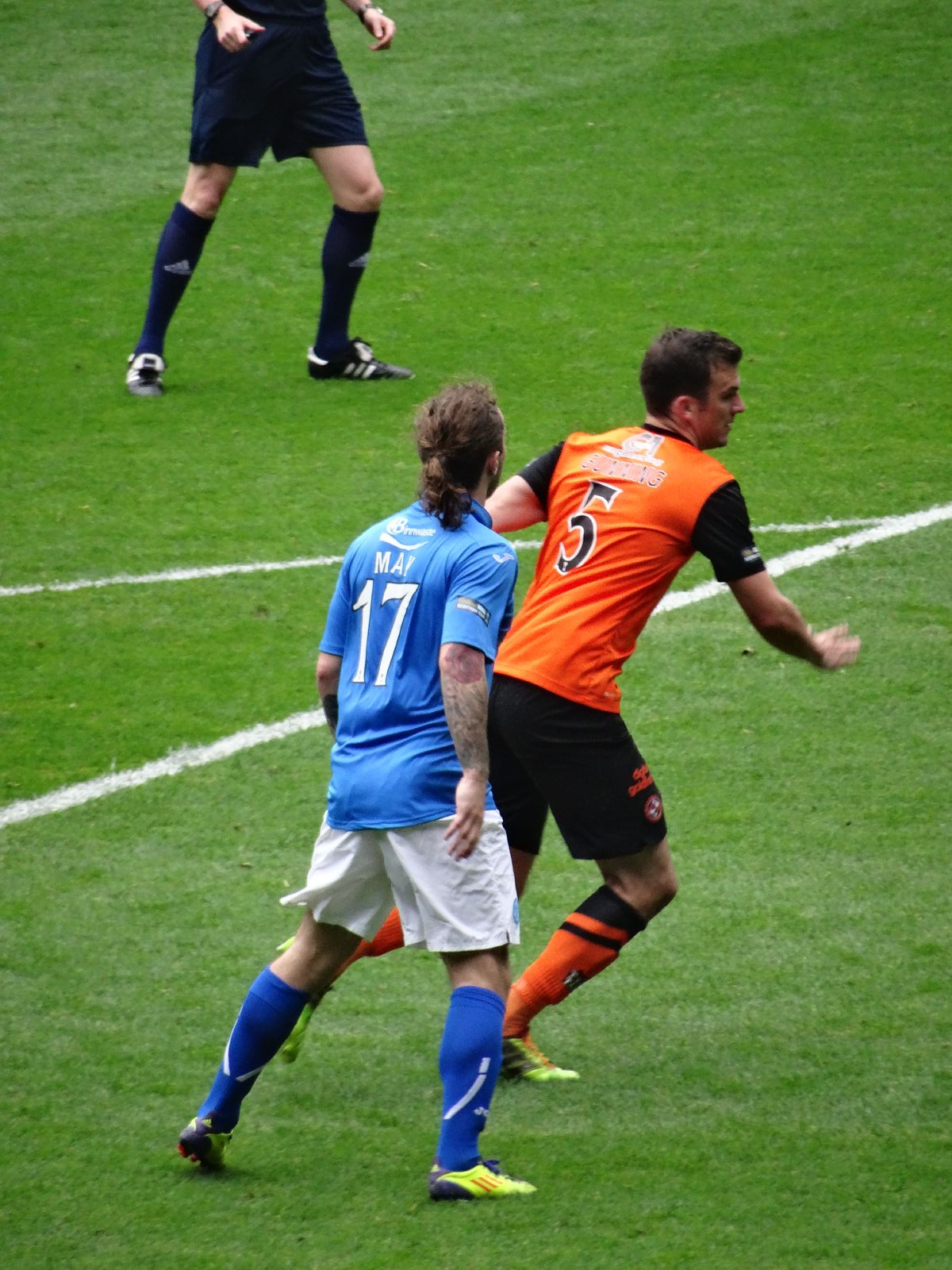
- Gunning (right) playing for Dundee United in the 2014 Scottish Cup final.

Personal information
- Full name: Gavin Jude Gunning
- Date of birth: 26 January 1991 (age 35)
- Place of birth: Dublin, Ireland
- Height: 6 ft 1 in (1.85 m)
- Position: Centre-back

Team information
- Current team: Swindon Town (first-team pathways coach)

Youth career
- 2000–2004: St. Joseph's Boys
- 2004–2006: Crumlin United
- 2006–2008: Blackburn Rovers

Senior career*
Years	Team	Apps	(Gls)
2008–2011	Blackburn Rovers	0	(0)
2009	→ Tranmere Rovers (loan)	6	(0)
2010	→ Rotherham United (loan)	21	(0)
2010	→ Bury (loan)	2	(0)
2011	→ Motherwell (loan)	14	(0)
2011–2014	Dundee United	83	(8)
2014–2015	Birmingham City	0	(0)
2015	Oldham Athletic	0	(0)
2015–2016	Dundee United	19	(0)
2016–2017	Greenock Morton	10	(0)
2017	Grimsby Town	14	(0)
2017–2018	Port Vale	19	(0)
2018–2019	Forest Green Rovers	63	(2)
2019	Billericay Town	7	(0)
2019–2020	Solihull Moors	15	(1)
2020–2021	Gloucester City	11	(1)
2021–2022	Chesterfield	38	(3)
Total		322	(15)

International career
- Republic of Ireland U17
2009	Republic of Ireland U19	3	(0)
2009–2012	Republic of Ireland U21	7	(0)

Managerial career
- 2023: Swindon Town (interim)
- 2023: Swindon Town (interim)
- 2024: Swindon Town (interim)
- * Club domestic league appearances and goals

Gavin Jude Gunning (born 26 January 1991) is an Irish former footballer who is first-team pathways coach at Swindon Town. He has represented the Republic of Ireland at under-21 and youth team levels.

Gunning played Gaelic football and association football in his youth before moving to England in February 2006 after being signed by Blackburn Rovers from Crumlin United. He never played a first-team game for Blackburn. However, he did have loan spells at Tranmere Rovers, Rotherham United, Bury, and Motherwell. He played in the 2011 Scottish Cup final. He transferred to Dundee United in August 2011 and went on to be named on the PFA Scotland Team of the Year for 2011–12. He left the club in June 2014 after featuring in the 2014 Scottish Cup final and subsequently joined Birmingham City, though he missed the 2014–15 season due to injury. He joined Oldham Athletic for a brief stay in August 2015 before returning to Dundee United three months later. He left United in April 2016 and signed a short-term deal with Greenock Morton five months later. He joined Grimsby Town in January 2017 and then moved on to Port Vale six months later. He switched to Forest Green Rovers in January 2018 and then moved into non-League football with Billericay Town in July 2019. He left Billericay for Solihull Moors in September 2019 before moving on to Gloucester City in March 2020 and then Chesterfield ten months later.

He began coaching at Swindon Town in July 2022 and was appointed interim head coach in January 2023, May 2023, and January 2024.

== Early life ==
Gunning was born in Dublin on 26 January 1991 and attended St Benildus College in the Kilmacud area of the city. As a youth, he played Gaelic football for Naomh Ólaf and Kilmacud Crokes and association football for Ballyogan Celtic, St. Joseph Boys and Crumlin United.

== Club career ==
=== Blackburn Rovers ===
Gunning joined Blackburn Rovers from Crumlin United in January 2006 at the age of 15; it was reported as a "major coup" for Blackburn manager Mark Hughes as league champions Chelsea had also expressed an interest. After featuring in the academy and reserve teams, Gunning was described as "one of the most promising prospects from Blackburn Rovers' Academy" and in 2008, signed a two-year professional contract. He was given the number 29 shirt by Rovers manager Sam Allardyce for the 2009–10 season, having been given number 42 the previous season, though it was thought to be likely that he would be sent out on loan. On 6 August 2009, he moved to Tranmere Rovers on a one-month loan. He made his first-team debut two days later, in a 2–0 defeat at Yeovil Town. He went on to make a total of six League One appearances whilst at Prenton Park.

On 22 January 2010, Gunning started his second loan spell during that season when he joined League Two club Rotherham United on an initial one-month emergency loan. After making two appearances, his loan was extended until the end of the season. In the second leg of the 2009–10 League Two Play-offs against Aldershot Town, Gunning set up a goal for Adam Le Fondre, as Rotherham won 3–0 on aggregate. Gunning was in the starting line-up in the play-offs finals at Wembley Stadium, however, Rotherham were defeated 3–2 by Dagenham & Redbridge.

In November 2010, Gunning joined League Two side Bury on loan until 11 December 2010, before the deal was extended until the end of January 2011. He played just twice during his stay at Gigg Lane. On 28 January 2011, Gunning joined Scottish Premier League club Motherwell on loan until the end of the 2010–11 season. He made his debut for the club on 2 February, coming on as a substitute for Steven Hammell in a 1–0 defeat to Kilmarnock. On 27 February, he assisted one of John Sutton's two goals, as Motherwell beat Celtic 2–0 at Fir Park, Gunning started the Scottish Cup final against Celtic and struck a terrific long-range shot in the 35th minute which bounced off the crossbar; Celtic went on to win the match 3–0. At the end of the season, he returned to Blackburn Rovers.

Ahead of the 2011–12 season, Gunning was linked with a return to Motherwell and a move to Aberdeen as loan deals. He then went on trial at Scunthorpe United. After playing in a friendly match against Rotherham United, manager Alan Knill said he was satisfied with Gunning's performance, but thought that he, along with other players on trial with the club, needed to do more to get a contract. After playing for Scunthorpe in another friendly, Knill said he was hoping to get Gunning signed on a permanent contract.

"It was put in my head every day just how good I was. So I started smelling myself. Some days, my attitude was so bad I wouldn't even turn up for training. I got to a point where I was being paid a lot of money at a young age and just couldn't deal with it. I'd been away from home from the age of 14. That was tough. But at no point did someone grab hold of me. That was the disappointing thing. They'd given me a big contract at a young age so maybe they should have done more."

— In an October 2016 interview, Gunning admitted that his poor attitude meant he never fulfilled his potential at Blackburn.

=== Dundee United ===
Having reportedly already rejected a move to Dundee United in July, as part of a swap deal involving David Goodwillie moving to Blackburn, manager Peter Houston then said that the club were hopeful of completing the signing of Gunning. On 12 August 2011, Gunning joined Dundee United on a three-year contract. Upon signing, he said he was very excited to be joining the club and he revealed he'd had other options in England and Scotland. He made his debut for the club in a 5–1 defeat to Celtic on 13 August, coming on as a substitute for Willo Flood in the 78th minute. He scored his first goal for the club against St Johnstone on 27 August, his goal levelling the score at 3–3. He scored his second goal of the season on 5 February, scoring with a powerful header, as Dundee United beat Rangers 2–0 in the fifth round of the Scottish Cup. His third goal for the club came on 24 February, as Dundee United beat Hearts 2–0, his goal coming after he had earlier cleared an effort off his own goal line. At the end of the 2011–12 season, Gunning was one of five Dundee United players alongside Paul Dixon, Gary Mackay-Steven, Johnny Russell and Jon Daly to be named in the PFA Scotland Team of the Year. He was linked with a summer move to Ipswich Town, but that was dismissed by Dundee United.

In the 2012–13 season, Gunning appeared in both legs of the third qualifying round of the Europa League, as Dundee United faced the Russian club Dynamo Moscow. After a 2–2 draw in the first leg at Tannadice, United lost the second leg 5–0, going out 7–2 on aggregate. He scored his first goal of the season against Dundee on 17 August 2012, as Dundee United won the Dundee derby 3–0. Gunning scored two goals in three games between 26 December and 2 January against St Johnstone and Aberdeen. On 9 February, Gunning sustained an injury in a game against Hearts which ruled him out of action for the rest of the season. Speaking in July 2013, Gunning said that Dundee United should have finished the season higher than they did, with the squad they had available.

Gunning returned from injury on 17 August 2013 in a 1–1 draw against Hibernian. However, he was sent off along with Kevin Thomson in the 65th-minute after an off the ball incident between the pair following a foul by Gunning. While Hibernian unsuccessfully appealed Thomson's red card, Dundee United decided not to appeal the red card shown to Gunning. On 4 September, Gunning was offered a three-match ban by the SFA after an incident involving Celtic's Virgil van Dijk, where he was alleged to have kicked out at his opponent. Dundee United appealed the ban, but the SFA's judicial panel rejected this. Following this incident, Dundee United officials banned both the BBC and STV from further interviews with the club, feeling that the BBC's highlighting of the incident had led to the suspension.

In December 2013, Gunning said that he was looking at signing a new contract with Dundee United. On 29 January 2014, Gunning suffered a knee injury during training. He made his return against Motherwell on 21 February, where he scored twice as Dundee United won 3–1. This was the start of a run of four goals in three games for Gunning as he followed up those two with a goal on 28 February, in a 3–1 win over Hibernian and then another one in the quarter-final of the Scottish Cup, in a 5–0 win over Inverness Caledonian Thistle on 9 March. In the Scottish Cup semi-final against Rangers, Gunning set up Dundee United's first goal, scored by Stuart Armstrong, in a 3–1 win. In the Scottish Cup final, Gunning started at centre-back, alongside Seán Dillon, as Dundee United lost 2–0 to St Johnstone at Celtic Park.

With his contract due to expire at the end of the 2013–14 season, Gunning was linked with a pre-contract move away from the club throughout the season, with Rangers amongst those mentioned, although Dundee United Manager Jackie McNamara said there had been no contact from them. In April, Gunning stated he would be willing to stay at the club, although he was uncertain about his future at Dundee United. After the Scottish Cup final though, he said that he had probably played his last game for the club and that he would be leaving at the end of his contract. Dundee United confirmed on 4 June 2014, that Gunning had left the club at the end of his contract.

=== Birmingham City ===
After leaving Dundee United, Gunning was initially set to sign for Sheffield Wednesday, but the deal fell through after he failed a medical. On 12 June 2014, Gunning then signed a one-year contract with Championship club Birmingham City. He made his debut in the first-round League Cup match against Cambridge United at St Andrew's, but was leaving the field injured just as Cambridge scored an equaliser; Birmingham won 3–1 after extra time. The injury was diagnosed as posterior cruciate ligament damage, and kept him out for the rest of the 2014–15 season. The club chose not to take up their option for another year and confirmed that he would be released when his contract expired.

=== Oldham Athletic ===
Gunning joined League One club Oldham Athletic on a short-term deal on 6 August 2015. He was released when the contract expired on 28 August, having made only one appearance for Oldham, against Middlesbrough in the League Cup at Boundary Park.

=== Return to Dundee United ===
Gunning returned to Dundee United in November 2015, signing a contract for the rest of the 2015–16 season. On 12 April 2016, Dundee United announced that Gunning had left the club by mutual consent, describing the decision as "a private matter". This came three days after a match against Inverness Caledonian Thistle at Tannadice, during which Gunning, described by the media as "a bizarre incident," had picked up the ball during play and walked off the pitch. He subsequently returned to the field to receive treatment for an injury before being substituted. It was reported that he had "sarcastically applauded" fans who verbally abused him over his conduct. Despite the club statement, manager Mixu Paatelainen subsequently clarified that while Gunning would not be considered for selection, he remained a Dundee United player and could return to training if he wished "or take an early summer holiday".

=== Greenock Morton ===
Gunning had a trial at Southend United in July 2016. He signed a short-term deal with Scottish Championship side Greenock Morton in September 2016. Manager Jim Duffy tried to secure him on a longer stay at Cappielow, but was unable to compete with the money offered by clubs in England.

=== Grimsby Town ===
After he chose not to extend his contract with Morton, Gunning returned to England and signed for EFL League Two club Grimsby Town on 5 January 2017 until the end of the 2016–17 season. After making 14 league appearances the club released him on 10 May 2017. He later admitted he was overweight during his time at Blundell Park and that he did not enjoy his time with the "Mariners".

=== Port Vale ===
Gunning signed a contract of undisclosed-length at newly-relegated League Two club Port Vale in July 2017, having impressed manager Michael Brown on trial. He was sent off on his second appearance for the "Valiants" after picking up two yellow cards in a 4–1 defeat to Leeds United in an EFL Cup first round match at Elland Road on 9 August; Brown described it as an "extremely stupid" dismissal. However, he impressed playing out-of-position at left-back under new manager Neil Aspin, who said his "heading and challenging has been first class". He added to his popularity at Vale Park with a headed goal in a 2–0 home victory over Oxford United in the first round of the FA Cup on 3 November. He left the club upon the expiry of his contract on 1 January 2018. Aspin revealed he had disagreed with owner Norman Smurthwaite over the failure to secure Gunning to a new contract.

=== Forest Green Rovers ===
On 4 January 2018, Gunning signed an 18-month contract with League Two Forest Green Rovers. He made 21 appearances in the second half of the 2017–18 campaign to help Mark Cooper's Green avoid relegation by a one-point margin. On 18 August 2018, Gunning was sent off in a 1–1 draw at Bury for denying Gold Omotayo a clear goalscoring opportunity. On 22 April 2019, he scored his first goal of the season in a 2–1 win over Cambridge United at The New Lawn and was named in the EFL Team of the Week. He ended the 2018–19 season with 46 appearances to his name, but was sent off in the play-off semi-final defeat at Tranmere Rovers and was not retained beyond the summer.

=== Non-League ===
On 17 July 2019, Gunning joined National League South club Billericay Town. He played seven games for the "Blues". On 24 September, he left Billericay and joined National League side Solihull Moors on a short-term deal in the hope of impressing manager Tim Flowers enough to win a longer stay at Damson Park. He went on to feature in 15 league games for the Moors during the 2019–20 season, before being released on 21 January. He joined National League North club Gloucester City on 6 March, signing a contract until the end of the 2019–20 season. He played just twice before the season was curtailed because of the COVID-19 pandemic, but went on to sign a new contract in August. After reportedly turning down a new contract offer, on 21 January, he became the latest player to leave Gloucester for Chesterfield. Chesterfield qualified for the play-offs at the end of the 2020–21 season, though were beaten by Notts County at the quarter-final stage. Gunning was appointed captain for the 2021–22 season and signed a new two-and-a-half-year contract in November 2021 to keep him at the club until the summer of 2024. However, he struggled with injuries and missed the play-offs with injury.

== International career ==
Having represented the Republic of Ireland at under-19 level, Gunning made his under-21 debut against Georgia in a 2011 UEFA European Under-21 Championship qualification match on 9 October 2009.

== Coaching career ==
Gunning was appointed to the coaching staff at Swindon Town in July 2022, with head coach Scott Lindsey stating that he would assist with coaching the team's defensive game. On 11 January 2023, he was appointed co-interim head coach, alongside Steve Mildenhall, after Lindsey left Swindon for Crawley Town. He ruled himself out of getting the job permanently and returned to his assistant role when Jody Morris was appointed as the club's new manager on 31 January. Morris was sacked on 1 May 2023, leading to Gunning and Mildenhall taking charge for the final game of the season. Michael Flynn was appointed as the club's next permanent manager seven days later. On 15 January 2024, Gunning was again appointed interim head coach following Flynn's departure. Swindon ended the 2023–24 season 19th in League Two, the lowest position in the club's history.

Following the appointment of Mark Kennedy as head coach, Gunning remained with the club in the role of first-team pathways coach, supporting players in the transition from youth to first-team football. Gunning agreed a new contract in May 2025.

== Style of play ==
Primarily a left-sided and left-footed centre-back, his wholehearted approach and eccentric personality earned him the nickname "Mad Gav Gunning".

== Career statistics ==
=== Playing statistics ===
Appearances and goals by club, season and competition
Club	Season	League			National Cup (Note: Cup competitions include the Scottish Cup and FA Cup)		League Cup (Note: League Cup competitions include the Scottish League Cup, Football League Cup/EFL Cup)		Other		Total	
Club	Season	Division	Apps	Goals	Apps	Goals	Apps	Goals	Apps	Goals	Apps	Goals
Blackburn Rovers	2008–09	Premier League	0	0	0	0	0	0	—		0	0
Blackburn Rovers	2009–10	Premier League	0	0	0	0	0	0	—		0	0
Blackburn Rovers	2010–11	Premier League	0	0	0	0	0	0	—		0	0
Blackburn Rovers	Total		0	0	0	0	0	0	—		0	0
Tranmere Rovers (loan)	2009–10	League One	6	0	—		0	0	—		6	0
Rotherham United (loan)	2009–10	League Two	21	0	—		—		3 (Note: Appearances in Football League Two play-offs)	0	24	0
Bury (loan)	2010–11	League Two	2	0	0	0	—		—		2	0
Motherwell (loan)	2010–11	Scottish Premier League	14	0	4	0	0	0	—		18	0
Dundee United	2011–12	Scottish Premier League	31	2	2	1	2	0	—		35	3
Dundee United	2012–13	Scottish Premier League	25	3	2	0	2	0	2 (Note: Appearances in UEFA Europa League)	0	31	3
Dundee United	2013–14	Scottish Premiership	27	3	4	1	2	0	—		33	4
Dundee United	Total		83	8	8	2	6	0	2	0	99	10
Birmingham City	2014–15	Championship	0	0	0	0	1	0	—		1	0
Oldham Athletic	2015–16	League One	0	0	0	0	1	0	0	0	1	0
Dundee United	2015–16	Scottish Premiership	19	0	1	0	—		—		20	0
Greenock Morton	2016–17	Scottish Championship	10	0	0	0	2	0	—		12	0
Grimsby Town	2016–17	League Two	14	0	—		—		—		14	0
Port Vale	2017–18	League Two	19	0	3	1	1	0	4 (Note: Appearance(s) in EFL Trophy)	0	27	1
Forest Green Rovers	2017–18	League Two	21	1	—		—		—		21	1
Forest Green Rovers	2018–19	League Two	42	1	0	0	1	0	3 (Note: 2 appearances in EFL Trophy and 1 appearance in the play-offs)	0	46	1
Forest Green Rovers	Total		63	2	0	0	1	0	3	0	67	2
Billericay Town	2019–20	National League South	7	0	0	0	—		—		7	0
Solihull Moors	2019–20	National League	15	1	3	0	—		1 (Note: Appearance in FA Trophy)	0	19	1
Gloucester City	2019–20	National League North	2	0	—		—		—		2	0
Gloucester City	2020–21	National League North	9	1	1	0	—		0	0	10	1
Gloucester City	Total		11	1	1	0	0	0	0	0	12	1
Chesterfield	2020–21	National League	18	2	—		—		1 (Note: Appearance in play-offs)	0	19	2
Chesterfield	2021–22	National League	20	1	0	0	—		0	0	20	1
Chesterfield	Total		38	3	0	0	0	0	1	0	39	3
Career total			322	15	20	3	12	0	14	0	368	18

=== Managerial statistics ===
As of match played 27 April 2024

Managerial record by team and tenure
Team	From	To	Record					Ref.
Team	From	To	P	W	D	L	Win %	Ref.
Swindon Town (co-interim)	11 January 2023	31 January 2023	2	1	1	0	50.0	
Swindon Town (co-interim)	1 May 2023	8 May 2023	1	1	0	0	100.0	
Swindon Town (interim)	15 January 2024	29 May 2024	18	5	5	8	27.8	
Total			21	7	6	8	33.3	

== Honours ==
Motherwell

- Scottish Cup runner-up: 2011

Dundee United

- Scottish Cup runner-up: 2014

Individual awards

- PFA Scotland Team of the Year: 2011–12
