= 2012–13 Dundee United F.C. season =

Dundee United
2012–13 season
- Chairman: Stephen Thompson
- Manager: Peter Houston (Until 28 January 2013); Jackie McNamara (From 30 January 2013)
- Stadium: Tannadice Park
- Premier League: Sixth place
- Europa League: Third qualifying round
- League Cup: Quarter-final
- Scottish Cup: Semi-final
- Top goalscorer: League: Johnny Russell (13); All: Johnny Russell (20)
- Highest home attendance: 13,538 vs. Dundee, 19 August 2012
- Lowest home attendance: 5,117 vs. Ross County, 26 January 2013
- Average home league attendance: League: 7,547
Home colours	Away colours

The 2012–13 season was the club's 104th season, having been founded as Dundee Hibernian in 1909 and their 15th consecutive season in the Scottish Premier League, having competed in it since its inauguration in 1998–99. United also competed in the Europa League, League Cup and the Scottish Cup.

== Summary ==
=== Season ===
United finished sixth in the Scottish Premier League. They reached the Third qualifying round of the Europa League, the Quarter-final of the League Cup and the Semi-final of the Scottish Cup.

=== Management ===
They began the season under the management of Peter Houston. But on 28 January 2013, Houston left the club by mutual consent, having previously announced his decision to leave at the end of the season. Stevie Campbell and Paul Hegarty were due to take over as caretaker manager's for their match against Motherwell the following day, although the match was postponed. Two days later Partick Thistle manager Jackie McNamara was appointed on a three-year contract, with Simon Donnelly appointed as his assistant.

== Results & fixtures ==
Win Draw Loss Postponed

=== Preseason ===
4 July 2012 Friendly	(Austria) Rapid Wien	3 – 0	Dundee United
19:00	Ildiz 16'; Drazan 20', 57'	Dundee United Report; Daily Record Report

14 July 2012 Friendly	Dundee	0 – 3	Dundee United	Dens Park
15:00		Report; Daily Record Report	Daly 2', 84', 86'	Attendance: 10,121; Referee: Madden

19 July 2012 Friendly	Dundee United	0 – 1	(England) Everton	Tannadice
19:45		Dundee United Report; Daily Record Report	Barkley 87'	Attendance: 6,537; Referee: Collum

21 July 2012 Friendly	Raith Rovers	1 – 2	Dundee United	Stark's Park
15:00	Clarke 48'	Raith Report	Watson 86'; McLean 89'	Referee: Salmond

24 July 2012 Friendly	Alloa Athletic	0 – 2	Dundee United	Recreation Park
19:45		Report; Record Report	Russell 21', 75'	Attendance: 413; Referee: Muir

27 July 2012 Friendly	(England) Gateshead	1 – 3	Dundee United	International Stadium
19:30	Odubade 55' (Penalty)	Report; Record Report	Russell 37'; Mark Millar 71'; Gardyne 85'	Attendance: 326; Referee: Joyce

=== Scottish Premier League ===
5 August 2012 Scottish Premier League	Dundee United	3 – 0	Hibernian	Tannadice
13:00	Russell 3'; Daly 74'; Gardyne 90'	BBC Report		Attendance: 7,267; Referee: Thomson

19 August 2012 Scottish Premier League	Dundee United	3 – 0	Dundee	Tannadice
12:45	Gunning 14'; Gardyne (yellow card) 24'; Russell 35', 38' (red card) 72'; Cierzniak (yellow card) 73'	Report	Riley (yellow card) 51'; Benedictus (yellow card) 64'; O'Donnell (red card) 72'	Attendance: 13,538; Referee: Murray

25 August 2012 Scottish Premier League	Kilmarnock	3 – 1	Dundee United	Rugby Park
15:00	McKenzie 47'; Pérez 50' (Penalty); Winchester 56'	BBC Report	Daly 79'	Attendance: 4,516; Referee: Allan

1 September 2012 Scottish Premier League	St Johnstone	0 – 0	Dundee United	McDiarmid Park
15:00		BBC Report		Attendance: 5,014; Referee: Collum

14 September 2012 Scottish Premier League	Dundee United	0 – 0	Ross County	Tannadice
19:45		BBC Report		Attendance: 6,892; Referee: Collum

22 September 2012 Scottish Premier League	Dundee United	0 – 3	Heart of Midlothian	Tannadice Park
15:00		BBC Report	Paterson 28', 61'; Novikovas 30'	Attendance: 6,597; Referee: Muir

29 September 2012 Scottish Premier League	Inverness Caledonian Thistle	4 – 0	Dundee United	Caledonian Stadium
15:00	Foran 31', 35'; Shinnie 70'; Roberts 73'	BBC Report		Attendance: 3,059; Referee: Finnie

6 October 2012 Scottish Premier League	Motherwell	P – P	Dundee United	Fir Park
15:00		BBC Report		Referee: Norris

20 October 2012 Scottish Premier League	Dundee United	1 – 1	Aberdeen	Tannadice Park
15:15	Rankin 22'	BBC Report	McGinn 52'	Attendance: 9,858; Referee: Brines

27 October 2012 Scottish Premier League	St Mirren	0 – 1	Dundee United	St Mirren Park
15:00		BBC Report	Russell 69' (pen.)	Attendance: 4,333; Referee: Norris

4 November 2012 Scottish Premier League	Dundee United	2 – 2	Celtic	Tannadice Park
12:45	Mackay-Steven 89'; Ambrose 90+2'	BBC Report	Miku 69'; Watt 80'	Attendance: 10,521; Referee: Collum

7 November 2012 Scottish Premier League	Motherwell	0 – 1	Dundee United	Fir Park
19:45		BBC Report	Russell 84'	Attendance: 3,941; Referee: Muir

11 November 2012 Scottish Premier League	Hibernian	2 – 1	Dundee United	Easter Road
12:45	Griffiths 19'; Doyle 51'	BBC Report	Mackay-Steven 53'	Attendance: 10,596; Referee: Thomson

16 November 2012 Scottish Premier League	Dundee United	3 – 3	Kilmarnock	Tannadice Park
19:45	Mackay-Steven 48'; Daly 56', 90+2'	BBC Report	Sheridan 9', 30'; Heffernan 53'	Attendance: 6,287; Referee: Muir

24 November 2012 Scottish Premier League	Ross County	1 – 2	Dundee United	Victoria Park
15:00	Vigurs 49'	BBC Report	Russell 52'; Armstrong 64'	Attendance: 3,930; Referee: Brines

27 November 2012 Scottish Premier League	Dundee United	1 – 2	Motherwell	Tannadice Park
19:45	Daly 37'	BBC Report	Higdon 7'; Humphrey 10'	Attendance: 5,289; Referee: Madden

9 December 2012 Scottish Premier League	Dundee	0 – 3	Dundee United	Dens Park
12:45		Sky Report	Watson 17'; Daly 71' (pen.); Flood 88'	Attendance: 11,419; Referee: Collum

15 December 2012 Scottish Premier League	Dundee United	4 – 4	Inverness Caledonian Thistle	Tannadice Park
15:00	Meekings 5' (Own goal); Daly 6', 90+3'; Skácel 8'	BBC Report	McKay 26', 28', 62' (Penalty); Warren 86'	Attendance: 5,483; Referee: Beaton

23 December 2012 Scottish Premier League	Heart of Midlothian	2 – 1	Dundee United	Tynecastle Stadium
16:30	Stevenson 15', 31' (Penalty)	BBC Report	Watson 57'	Attendance: 13,603; Referee: Thomson

26 December 2012 Scottish Premier League	Dundee United	1 – 1	St Johnstone	Tannadice Park
12:00	Gunning 2'	BBC Report	McLean 47' (Own goal)	Attendance: 7,063; Referee: Murray

30 December 2012 Scottish Premier League	Dundee United	3 – 4	St Mirren	Tannadice Park
15:00	Daly 43'; Armstrong 45'; McLean (red card) 69'; Douglas 90'	BBC Report; SKY Report	Dummett 16'; Thompson 50'; McAusland 66' van Zanten 78'	Attendance: 6,386; Referee: Norris

2 January 2013 Scottish Premier League	Aberdeen	2 – 2	Dundee United	Pittodrie Stadium
15:00	Vernon 11'; McGinn 53'	BBC Report	Gunning 20'; Langfield 34' (Own goal)	Attendance: 13,176; Referee: Muir

19 January 2013 Scottish Premier League	Kilmarnock	2 – 3	Dundee United	Rugby Park
15:00	Pascali 18', 90+2'	BBC Report	Russell 43', 63', 88'	Attendance: 4,112; Referee: Thomson

22 January 2013 Scottish Premier League	Celtic	4 – 0	Dundee United	Celtic Park
19:45	Hooper 19', 80'; Wanyama 33'; Brown 84'	BBC Report		Attendance: 42,596; Referee: Norris

26 January 2013 Scottish Premier League	Dundee United	1 – 1	Ross County	Tannadice Park
15:00	Mackay-Steven 52'	BBC Report	Brittain 82'	Attendance: 5,117; Referee: Brines

29 January 2013 Scottish Premier League	Motherwell	P – P	Dundee United	Fir Park
19:45		BBC Report
Note: Postponed due to a waterlogged pitch

9 February 2012 Scottish Premier League	Dundee United	3 – 1	Heart of Midlothian	Tannadice
15:00	Russell 2'; Flood 62'; Gardyne 89'	BBC Report	Ngoo 76'	Attendance: 6,842; Referee: Collum

16 February 2013 Scottish Premier League	Celtic	6 – 2	Dundee United	Celtic Park
15:00	Ambrose 11'; Commons 22', 55' (pen.); Ledley 37'; Stokes 70', 82'	BBC Report	Armstrong 10'; Russell 90'	Attendance: 46,496; Referee: Madden

19 February 2013 Scottish Premier League	Motherwell	0 – 1	Dundee United	Fir Park
19:45		BBC Report	Russell 17'	Attendance: 4,633; Referee: Finnie

24 February 2013 Scottish Premier League	Dundee United	2 – 2	Hibernian	Tannadice Park
16:00	Rankin 6'; Russell 86' (pen.)	BBC Report	McPake 27'; Griffiths 51'	Attendance: 6,160; Referee: Muir

27 February 2013 Scottish Premier League	Inverness Caledonian Thistle	0 – 0	Dundee United	Caledonian Stadium
19:45		BBC Report		Attendance: 3,413; Referee: Colvin

9 March 2013 Scottish Premier League	St Mirren	0 – 0	Dundee United	St Mirren Park
15:00		BBC Report	Rankin (red card) 88'	Attendance: 3,394; Referee: Beaton

17 March 2013 Scottish Premier League	Dundee United	1 – 1	Dundee	Tannadice Park
12:00	Gardyne 89'	BBC Report	Irvine (red card) 21'; Conroy 67'	Attendance: 10,731; Referee: Madden

1 April 2013 Scottish Premier League	St Johnstone	1 – 1	Dundee United	McDiarmid Park
20:00	Craig 90+3'	BBC Report	Gauld 24'; Armstrong (yellow card) 79' (yellow-red card)	Attendance: 4,613; Referee: Brines

6 April 2013 Scottish Premier League	Dundee United	1 – 0	Aberdeen	Tannadice Park
15:00	Boulding 90+3'	BBC Report		Attendance: 8,577; Referee: Thomson

19 April 2013 Scottish Premier League	Dundee United	1 – 3	Motherwell	Tannadice Park
19:30	Daly 69'	BBC Report	Higdon 2', 55'; Ojamaa 8'	Attendance: 5,634; Referee: Beaton

26 April 2013 Scottish Premier League	Ross County	1 – 0	Dundee United	Victoria Park
	Sproule 54'	BBC Report	Douglas (red card) 65'	Attendance: 3,183; Referee: Clancy

4 May 2013 Scottish Premier League	Dundee United	0 – 1	St Johnstone	Tannadice Park
15:00		BBC Report	Craig 38'	Attendance: 6,437; Referee: Norris

11 May 2013 Scottish Premier League	Inverness Caledonian Thistle	1 – 2	Dundee United	Caledonian Stadium
15:00	Doran 42'	BBC Report; SKY Report	Dow 50'; Mackay-Steven 90+1'	Attendance: 3,728; Referee: Allan

19 May 2013 Scottish Premier League	Dundee United	0 – 4	Celtic	Tannadice Park
12:45		BBC Report	Commons 12'; Samaras 17', 27'; Stokes 85'	Attendance: 8,717; Referee: Beaton

=== Scottish League Cup ===
25 September 2012 Round 3	Queen of the South	0 – 1	Dundee United	Palmerston Park
19:45		BBC Report; SFL Report	Russel 28'	Attendance: 2,374; Referee: Euan Norris

31 October 2012 QF	Dundee United	1 – 1 (a.e.t.) (4 – 5 p)	Heart of Midlothian	Tannadice Park
19:15	Russell 35'	BBC Report	Paterson 21'; Barr (yellow card) 79' (red card)	Attendance: 3,789; Referee: Murray
	Penalties
	Russell (penalty scored); Mackay-Steven (penalty missed); Rankin (penalty missed); Gunning (penalty scored); McLean (penalty scored); Armstrong (penalty scored); Dillon (penalty missed)		(penalty missed) Grainger; (penalty missed) Sutton; (penalty scored) Webster; (penalty scored) Driver; (penalty scored) R McGowan; (penalty scored) Robinson; (penalty scored) Žaliūkas

=== Scottish Cup ===
1 December 2012 Round 4	Stranraer	0 – 5	Dundee United	Stair Park
15:00		BBC Report	Russell 13', 27', 69'; Daly 40', 61'	Attendance: 1,089; Referee: Finnie

2 February 2013 Round 5	Dundee United	3 – 0	Rangers	Tannadice Park
12:45	Russell 1', 79'; Daly 36'	BBC Report; Sky Report	Naismith (red card) 1'; Black (yellow card) 1' (yellow-red card) 88'	Attendance: 9,564; Referee: Norris

3 March 2013 QF	Dundee	1 – 2	Dundee United	Dens Park
12:45	McAlister 19'	BBC Report	McLean 11'; Mackay-Steven 35'	Attendance: 10,191; Referee: Brines

14 April 2013 SF	Dundee United	3 – 4	Celtic	Hampden Park
12:45	Mackay-Steven 24'; Daly 30', 71'	BBC Report; Sky Sports Report	Commons 2', 60'; Wanyama 31'; Stokes 104'	Referee: Thomson

=== UEFA Europa League ===
Dundee United entered at the Third qualifying round.

2 August 2012 Leg 1	Dundee United	2 – 2	(Russia) Dynamo Moscow	Tannadice
19:45	Flood 37'; Watson 76'	BBC Report	Semshov 50'; Kokorin 90'	Attendance: 9,977; Referee: Avram

9 August 2012 Leg 2	(Russia) Dynamo Moscow	5 – 0	Dundee United	Arena Khimki
17:00	Semshov 3'; Kokorin 63'; Yusupov 40'; Sapeta 83', 88'	BBC Report		Attendance: 9,063; Referee: Johannesson

== Player statistics ==
=== Captains ===
No.	P	Name	Country	No. games	Notes
9	FW	Jon Daly	(Republic of Ireland)	41	Club captain

Last updated: 19 May 2013
Source: Competitive match reports.
Competitive matches only
Matches started as captain only
Country: FIFA nationality; No.: Squad number; P: Position; Name: Player name; No. Games: Number of games started as captain.

=== Squad information ===
Last updated 19 May 2013

No.	Pos	Nat	Player	Total		Premier League		Europa League		League Cup		Scottish Cup	
No.	Pos	Nat	Player	Apps	Goals	Apps	Goals	Apps	Goals	Apps	Goals	Apps	Goals
1	GK	(Poland) POL	Radosław Cierzniak	46	0	38+0	0	2+0	0	2+0	0	4+0	0
2	DF	(Republic of Ireland) IRL	Sean Dillon	37	0	31+0	0	1+0	0	2+0	0	3+0	0
3	DF	(Scotland) SCO	Barry Douglas	34	1	27+1	1	2+0	0	0+0	0	4+0	0
4	DF	(Scotland) SCO	Brian McLean	34	1	25+4	0	1+0	0	1+1	0	2+0	1
5	DF	(Republic of Ireland) IRL	Gavin Gunning	31	3	25+0	3	2+0	0	2+0	0	2+0	0
6	MF	(Republic of Ireland) IRL	Willo Flood	45	3	37+0	2	2+0	1	2+0	0	4+0	0
7	FW	(Scotland) SCO	Johnny Russell	38	20	30+2	13	2+0	0	2+0	2	2+0	5
8	MF	(Scotland) SCO	John Rankin	43	2	35+0	2	2+0	0	2+0	0	4+0	0
9	FW	(Republic of Ireland) IRL	Jon Daly	44	15	35+1	10	2+0	0	2+0	0	4+0	5
10	MF	(Republic of Ireland) IRL	Richie Ryan	29	0	12+10	0	2+0	0	2+0	0	0+3	0
11	MF	(Scotland) SCO	Gary Mackay-Steven	29	7	19+4	5	2+0	0	0+1	0	3+0	2
12	DF	(Scotland) SCO	Keith Watson	37	3	29+0	2	2+0	1	2+0	0	4+0	0
13	GK	(England) ENG	Steve Banks	0	0	0+0	0	0+0	0	0+0	0	0+0	0
14	MF	(Scotland) SCO	Mark Millar	20	0	11+7	0	0+0	0	0+1	0	1+0	0
15	FW	(Scotland) SCO	Michael Gardyne	37	3	10+20	3	0+1	0	2+0	0	1+3	0
16	MF	(Scotland) SCO	Stuart Armstrong	43	3	30+6	3	0+1	0	1+1	0	3+1	0
17	DF	(Sweden) SWE	Marcus Törnstrand	1	0	0+1	0	0+0	0	0+0	0	0+0	0
18	FW	(Scotland) SCO	Ryan Dow	14	1	3+9	1	0+1	0	0+0	0	0+1	0
19	DF	(France) FRA	Grégory Vignal	0	0	0+0	0	0+0	0	0+0	0	0+0	0
19	FW	(England) ENG	Rory Boulding	9	1	3+5	1	0+0	0	0+0	0	0+1	0
20	FW	(Czech Republic) CZE	Miloš Lačný	2	0	0+2	0	0+0	0	0+0	0	0+0	0
21	GK	(Slovakia) SVK	Filip Mentel	0	0	0+0	0	0+0	0	0+0	0	0+0	0
23	FW	(Scotland) SCO	Dale Hilson	1	0	0+1	0	0+0	0	0+0	0	0+0	0
25	GK	(Scotland) SCO	Marc McCallum	0	0	0+0	0	0+0	0	0+0	0	0+0	0
27	FW	(Scotland) SCO	Robert Thomson	2	0	0+2	0	0+0	0	0+0	0	0+0	0
33	DF	(Scotland) SCO	Luke Johnston	2	0	1+1	0	0+0	0	0+0	0	0+0	0
38	MF	(Scotland) SCO	Ryan Gauld	11	1	6+4	1	0+0	0	0+0	0	1+0	0
40	MF	(Scotland) SCO	Darren Petrie	1	0	0+1	0	0+0	0	0+0	0	0+0	0
44	DF	(Scotland) SCO	John Souttar	9	0	7+1	0	0+0	0	0+0	0	1+0	0
51	MF	(Czech Republic) CZE	Rudi Skácel	16	1	5+9	1	0+0	0	0+1	0	1+0	0

=== Disciplinary record ===
Includes all competitive matches.

Last updated 19 May 2013

Number	Nation	Position	Name	Premier League		Europa League		League Cup		Scottish Cup		Total	
Number	Nation	Position	Name	Yellow card	Red card	Yellow card	Red card	Yellow card	Red card	Yellow card	Red card	Yellow card	Red card
1	(Poland)	GK	Radosław Cierzniak	2	0	0	0	0	0	0	0	2	0
2	(Republic of Ireland)	DF	Sean Dillon	1	0	0	0	0	0	0	0	1	0
3	(Scotland)	DF	Barry Douglas	3	1	0	0	0	0	0	0	3	1
4	(Scotland)	DF	Brian McLean	4	1	0	0	0	0	0	0	4	1
5	(Republic of Ireland)	DF	Gavin Gunning	1	0	0	0	0	0	1	0	2	0
6	(Republic of Ireland)	MF	Willo Flood	6	0	0	0	1	0	1	0	8	0
7	(Scotland)	FW	Johnny Russell	3	1	1	0	0	0	0	0	4	1
8	(Scotland)	MF	John Rankin	5	1	0	0	1	0	0	0	6	1
9	(Republic of Ireland)	FW	Jon Daly	2	0	0	0	0	0	0	0	2	0
10	(Republic of Ireland)	MF	Richie Ryan	0	0	0	0	1	0	0	0	1	0
11	(Scotland)	MF	Gary Mackay-Steven	2	0	0	0	0	0	1	0	3	0
12	(Scotland)	DF	Keith Watson	1	0	1	0	0	0	1	0	3	0
13	(England)	GK	Steve Banks	0	0	0	0	0	0	0	0	0	0
14	(Scotland)	MF	Mark Millar	7	0	0	0	0	0	1	0	8	0
15	(Scotland)	FW	Michael Gardyne	1	0	0	0	0	0	0	0	1	0
16	(Scotland)	MF	Stuart Armstrong	4	1	0	0	0	0	1	0	5	1
17	(Sweden)	DF	Marcus Törnstrand	0	0	0	0	0	0	0	0	0	0
18	(Scotland)	FW	Ryan Dow	0	0	0	0	0	0	0	0	0	0
19	(France)	DF	Grégory Vignal	0	0	0	0	0	0	0	0	0	0
19	(England)	FW	Rory Boulding	0	0	0	0	0	0	0	0	0	0
20	(Czech Republic)	FW	Miloš Lačný	1	0	0	0	0	0	0	0	1	0
21	(Slovakia)	GK	Filip Mentel	0	0	0	0	0	0	0	0	0	0
23	(Scotland)	FW	Dale Hilson	0	0	0	0	0	0	0	0	0	0
24	(Scotland)	DF	Ross Smith	0	0	0	0	0	0	0	0	0	0
25	(Scotland)	GK	Marc McCallum	0	0	0	0	0	0	0	0	0	0
27	(Scotland)	FW	Robert Thomson	0	0	0	0	0	0	0	0	0	0
33	(Scotland)	DF	Luke Johnston	0	0	0	0	0	0	0	0	0	0
38	(Scotland)	MF	Ryan Gauld	0	0	0	0	0	0	0	0	0	0
40	(Scotland)	MF	Darren Petrie	0	0	0	0	0	0	0	0	0	0
44	(Scotland)	DF	John Souttar	2	0	0	0	0	0	0	0	2	0
51	(Czech Republic)	MF	Rudi Skácel	2	0	0	0	0	0	0	0	2	0

== Team statistics ==
=== League table ===
Pos	Team	Pld	W	D	L	GF	GA	GD	Pts	Qualification or relegation
4	Inverness Caledonian Thistle	38	13	15	10	64	60	+4	54	
5	Ross County	38	13	14	11	47	48	−1	53	
6	Dundee United	38	11	14	13	51	62	−11	47 (Note: Teams in the bottom half at the time of the split may not overtake a team in the top 6 at the time of the split.)	
7	Hibernian	38	13	12	13	49	52	−3	51	Qualification for the Europa League second qualifying round (Note: Since the winners of 2012–13 Scottish Cup, Celtic, qualified for European competition based on league position, the runners–up Hibernian secured a spot in Europa League second qualifying round.)
8	Aberdeen	38	11	15	12	41	43	−2	48	

Source: SPFL Archive
Rules for classification: 1) points; 2) goal difference; 3) number of goals scored.

=== Division summary ===
Round	1	2	3	4	5	6	7	8	9	10	11	12	13	14	15	16	17	18	19	20	21	22	23	24	25	26	27	28	29	30	31	32	33	34	35	36	37	38
Ground	H	H	A	A	H	H	A	H	A	H	A	A	H	A	H	A	H	A	H	H	A	A	A	H	H	A	A	H	A	A	H	A	H	H	A	H	A	H
Result	W	W	L	D	D	L	L	D	W	D	W	L	D	W	L	W	D	L	D	L	D	W	L	D	W	L	W	D	D	D	D	D	W	L	L	L	W	L
Position	1	1	3	3	2	7	11	11	10	10	7	8	8	7	7	7	6	8	8	8	8	7	7	7	6	9	8	9	8	7	7	8	6	6	6	6	6	6

Updated to match(es) played on 19 May 2013. Source:
A = Away; H = Home; W = Win; D = Draw; L = Loss

== Transfers ==
=== Players in ===
Player	From	Fee
(Poland) Radosław Cierzniak	(Poland) KS Cracovia	Free
(Scotland) Michael Gardyne	(Scotland) Ross County	Free
(Scotland) Mark Millar	(Scotland) Falkirk	Free
(Scotland) Brian McLean	(England) Preston North End	Free
(France) Grégory Vignal	Free agent	Free
(Czech Republic) Rudi Skácel	(Scotland) Heart of Midlothian	Free
(Sweden) Marcus Törnstrand	(Sweden) Hammarby IF	Free
(England) Rory Boulding	(Scotland) Kilmarnock	Free

=== Players out ===
Player	To	Fee
(Scotland) Garry Kenneth	(England) Bristol Rovers	Free
(Slovakia) Dušan Perniš	(Poland) Pogoń Szczecin	Free
(Scotland) Paul Dixon	(England) Huddersfield Town	Free
(Scotland) Danny Swanson	(England) Peterborough United	Free
(Scotland) Ross Smith	(Scotland) Peterhead	Loan
(Scotland) Robbie Neilson	Free agent	Free
(Scotland) Scott Robertson	(England) Blackpool	Free
(Scotland) Marc Scott	(Scotland) Carnoustie Panmure	Free
(Scotland) Robert Thomson	(Scotland) Alloa Athletic	Loan
(Scotland) John Young	(Scotland) Carnoustie Panmure	Free
(Slovakia) Filip Mentel	Free agent	Free
(France) Grégory Vignal	Free agent	Free
(Scotland) Willie Robertson	(Scotland) Forfar Athletic	Loan
(Scotland) Dale Hilson	(Scotland) Forfar Athletic	Loan
(Czech Republic) Rudi Skácel	(Czech Republic) Slavia Prague	Free
(Scotland) Gerard Lunday	Free agent	Free
