= Lauri Dalla Valle =

Finnish footballer (born 1991)

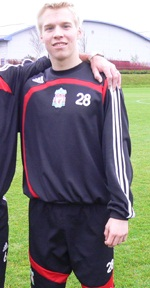
- Dalla Valle while contracted to Liverpool

Personal information
- Full name: Lauri Dalla Valle
- Date of birth: 14 September 1991 (age 35)
- Place of birth: Kontiolahti, Finland
- Height: 1.80 m (5 ft 11 in)
- Position: Striker

Youth career
- 2004–2005: JIPPO
- 2005: Inter Milan
- 2005–2007: JIPPO

Senior career*
Years	Team	Apps	(Gls)
2007	JIPPO	8	(0)
2008–2010	Liverpool	0	(0)
2010–2013	Fulham	0	(0)
2011	→ Bournemouth (loan)	8	(2)
2011–2012	→ Dundee United (loan)	12	(3)
2012	→ Exeter City (loan)	5	(0)
2012–2013	→ Crewe Alexandra (loan)	10	(5)
2013	Molde	4	(0)
2013–2014	Sint-Truiden	21	(0)
2014–2016	Crewe Alexandra	31	(6)
2017	Zemun	3	(0)
Total		102	(16)

International career
2006	Finland U16	2	(3)
2007–2008	Finland U17	7	(4)
2008–2009	Finland U19	8	(3)
2011–2012	Finland U21	10	(3)
- * Club domestic league appearances and goals

Lauri Dalla Valle (born 14 September 1991) is a Finnish former professional footballer who played as a striker.

After playing youth football for JIPPO and Inter Milan, Dalla Valle moved to England in 2008 to join Liverpool. After two seasons, he joined Fulham, and while there spent spells with Bournemouth, Dundee United, Exeter City and Crewe Alexandra, leaving the club in 2013. After spells in Norway (with Molde) and Belgium (with Sint-Truiden), he returned to England in 2014 to rejoin Crewe Alexandra.

Dalla Valle is also a former youth international, representing Finland at every level up to and including under-21.

== Early life ==
Dalla Valle was born in Kontiolahti, near the city of Joensuu, Finland on 14 September 1991, one of three children to Loreno, an Italian former police officer and mushroom company boss, and Marketta, who is Finnish.

== Club career ==
=== Early career ===
Dalla Valle began his career in Finland with JIPPO, and his talent saw him join Internazionale's youth team in 2005. However, Dalla Valle, struggling with the language, soon became homesick and returned to Finland after a few months. He started the 2007 season with JIPPO in the Finnish First Division, but was seriously injured in the fourth round of the Finnish Cup in May 2007, and was out for several months. He scored his only senior goal of the 2007 season in that match before being injured. In the end he only played in 8 matches in Finnish Division I (Miesten Ykkönen) in the 2007 season. He was a transfer target for Chelsea in October 2007.

=== Liverpool ===
In early November 2007 he trialled with Liverpool, for the second time (the original time being in November 2006) and he signed a three-and-a-half-year contract with the club a few days later, arriving at the club in January 2008. He was part of the Liverpool team that reached the final of the FA Youth Cup in 2009, scoring 8 goals, including 4 against Birmingham in the two-legged semi-final. He was promoted to the Liverpool Reserves squad in June 2009 and started the 2009–10 season as a senior member of the reserves at Melwood.

On 29 July 2010, he made his first and only appearance for Liverpool, coming on as a substitute for Alberto Aquilani in the 83rd minute of the 2010–11 UEFA Europa League Third qualifying round tie against FK Rabotnički.

=== Fulham ===
On 31 August 2010, both Dalla Valle and fellow youngster Alex Kačaniklić signed for Fulham, as part of the deal that took left-back Paul Konchesky to Liverpool.

On 4 March 2011, Dalla Valle joined Bournemouth on a one-month loan. On 5 March 2011, Dalla Valle scored on his league debut for Bournemouth in a 3–0 home win over Oldham Athletic. He scored his second goal for Bournemouth in a 1–3 defeat against Southampton on 12 March 2011.

Dalla Valle made his Fulham debut as a substitute for the Europa League match against NSÍ Runavík on 30 June 2011, before joining Scottish Premier League side Dundee United two months later on loan until mid-January.

Dalla Valle joined Exeter City on a one-month loan deal on 19 March 2012. He returned to Fulham on 19 April 2012 after his loan expired.

On 5 November 2012, Lauri joined Crewe Alexandra on loan until 8 December 2012. He scored on his debut the next day as Crewe won at Doncaster Rovers, and then scored on his home debut in a 3–2 win over Colchester United. On 24 November, he scored both goals in a 2–0 win against Crawley Town.

=== Molde ===
Fulham confirmed that Dalla Valle had left the club on a permanent basis on 25 February 2013 to join Norwegian team Molde managed by ex–Manchester United player Ole Gunnar Solskjær. Dalla Valle played four matches without scoring a goal for Molde, until he left the club after half a year in July 2013.

=== Sint-Truiden ===
On 5 July 2013, Dalla Valle joined Belgian Second Division side Sint-Truiden on a three-year contract. He was released on 13 June 2014 after a single season. He then went on trial with Vicenza in July.

=== Crewe ===
He rejoined Crewe in December 2014, signing a contract until June 2016. Dalle Valle was released by Crewe at the end of the 2015–16 season.

=== Zemun ===
In August 2017 he joined newly promoted Serbian SuperLiga side FK Zemun. He made his debut in the 2017–18 Serbian SuperLiga on 26 August 2017, in the 7th round in a home game against OFK Bačka in a home draw 1–1. He debuted as an 82nd-minute substitute of Lithuanian striker Justas Lasickas. He was released on 1 November 2017.

== International career ==
Dalla Valle's father is Italian, and consequently he is eligible to represent Italy at international level, but some have said that it is unlikely that he will opt for Italy, and Dalla Valle has represented the Finnish under-17 side in qualifying for the 2006 UEFA European Under-17 Football Championship. Dalla Valle, however, has since refused to play for the Finnish under-21 side team in the 2011 European Championship qualification. U21 manager Markku Kanerva and the A national team coach Stuart Baxter criticised the decision. Stuart Baxter was supposed to invite Dalla Valle to Finland national football team training camp in January 2009, but Liverpool forbid him to join based on club obligations.

== Style of play ==
Dalla Valle was likened to a young Fernando Torres due to his speed, work rate, and finishing ability.

== Personal life ==
In June 2018, it was confirmed that Dalla Valle had retired from football to focus on his photography and consultancy company in Italy.

== Career statistics ==
Club	Season	League			National Cup		League Cup		Other		Total	
Club	Season	Division	Apps	Goals	Apps	Goals	Apps	Goals	Apps	Goals	Apps	Goals
JIPPO	2007	Ykkönen	8	0	1	1	—		0	0	9	1
Liverpool	2008–09	Premier League	0	0	0	0	0	0	0	0	0	0
Liverpool	2009–10	Premier League	0	0	0	0	0	0	0	0	0	0
Liverpool	2010–11	Premier League	0	0	0	0	0	0	1	0	1	0
Liverpool	Total		0	0	0	0	0	0	1	0	1	0
Fulham	2010–11	Premier League	0	0	0	0	0	0	0	0	0	0
Fulham	2011–12	Premier League	0	0	0	0	0	0	2	0	2	0
Fulham	Total		0	0	0	0	0	0	2	0	2	0
Bournemouth (loan)	2010–11	League One	8	2	0	0	0	0	0	0	8	2
Dundee United (loan)	2011–12	Scottish Premier League	12	3	1	0	2	0	0	0	15	3
Exeter City (loan)	2011–12	League One	5	0	0	0	0	0	0	0	5	0
Crewe Alexandra (loan)	2012–13	League One	10	5	1	0	0	0	1	0	12	5
Molde	2013	Tippeligaen	4	0	2	0	—		0	0	6	0
Sint-Truiden	2013–14	Belgian Second Division	21	0	2	0	—		0	0	23	0
Crewe Alexandra	2014–15	League One	17	4	0	0	0	0	0	0	17	4
Crewe Alexandra	2015–16	League One	14	2	1	0	1	0	1	0	17	2
Crewe Alexandra	Total		31	6	1	0	1	0	1	0	34	6
Zemun	2017–18	Serbian SuperLiga	3	0	1	0	—		0	0	4	0
Career total			102	16	9	1	3	0	5	0	118	17
