= Jon Daly (footballer) =

Irish football player and coach

Personal information
- Full name: Jonathan Marvin Daly
- Date of birth: 8 January 1983 (age 43)
- Place of birth: Dublin, Ireland
- Height: 6 ft 3 in (1.91 m)
- Position: Striker

Youth career
- Cherry Orchard

Senior career*
| Years | Team | Apps | (Gls) |
| 1998–2005 | Stockport County | 91 | (14) |
| 2004 | → Bury (loan) | 7 | (1) |
| 2004 | → Grimsby Town (loan) | 3 | (1) |
| 2005–2007 | Hartlepool United | 64 | (13) |
| 2006 | → Bury (loan) | 11 | (2) |
| 2007–2013 | Dundee United | 167 | (58) |
| 2013–2015 | Rangers | 50 | (21) |
| 2015–2016 | Raith Rovers | 15 | (1) |
| Total | | 398 | (112) |

International career
| 1999–2000 | Republic of Ireland U16 | 8 | (1) |
| 2001–2002 | Republic of Ireland U19 | 9 | (7) |
| 2002–2003 | Republic of Ireland U20 | 5 | (0) |
| 2002–2003 | Republic of Ireland U21 | 7 | (1) |

Managerial career
- 2016–2020: Heart of Midlothian U20
- 2016: Heart of Midlothian (joint interim manager)
- 2017: Heart of Midlothian (interim manager)
- 2020–2021: TPS Turku U23
- 2020–2021: TPS Turku (assistant manager)
- 2021–2023: St Patrick's Athletic (assistant manager)
- 2023: St Patrick's Athletic (interim manager)
- 2023–2024: St Patrick's Athletic
- 2024: Dundalk
- 2025: Galway United (assistant manager)
- 2025–2026: Waterford
- * Club domestic league appearances and goals

Jonathan Marvin Daly (born 8 January 1983) is an Irish football coach and former player who played as a forward. Daly began his senior playing career in England, where he played for Stockport County and Hartlepool United; he also had loan spells with Bury and Grimsby Town. Daly moved to Scottish football in 2007, when he signed for Dundee United. Daly spent over six years at the club, eventually becoming club captain, and won the Scottish Cup in 2010. He signed for Rangers in 2013, winning the League One title in his first season. Daly was described as the first Irish Catholic to join Rangers, a team with a Protestant identity.

Released by Rangers in 2015, Daly ended his playing career with Raith Rovers and retired in January 2016. He became a coach at Heart of Midlothian, where he was interim manager twice. He was twice included in the PFA Scotland Team of the Year awards, for the Scottish Premier League in 2012 and for League One in 2014. In international football, Daly represented the Republic of Ireland at all youth levels up to the under-21 team.

== Club career ==
=== Stockport County ===
Born in Dublin, Ireland, Daly started his football career at Irish amateur side Cherry Orchard, before signing for Stockport County when he was fifteen years old in May 1998. When Daly first started at the club, he made an immediate impact scoring regularly for the youth and reserve team. On 2 October 1999, Daly then made his professional football debut against Walsall and become Stockport County's second youngest player when he came off the bench, in a 2–1 win. He went on to make three appearances for the club, all coming on as a substitute in the 1999–00 season.

Daly began to make an impression on manager Andy Kilner during Stockport City's pre-season tour of Scandinavia. After coming on a substitute against Landskrona BoIS, he impressed Kilner and the youngster was awarded with a start against Kristianstads, in which he scored his first senior goal after "lobbing" the Kristianstad keeper. Over the next two seasons, Daly appeared five times in the first team. On 30 October 2001, he made his first team return in over a year, coming on as a 78th-minute substitute, in a 2–0 loss against Walsall. On 16 January 2002, Daly scored his first senior goal in his professional career against Bolton Wanderers in the FA Cup, as the club loss 4–1. Shortly after, he received a four match suspension for an "unprofessional conduct" during the match for Stockport City's reserve team. On 26 February 2002, Daly made his return to the first team from suspension, starting the whole game, in a 3–1 loss against Grimsby Town. On 9 March 2002, however, he was sent off in the 64th minute for elbowing Mitchell Thomas, in a 2–0 loss against Burnley. On 16 March 2002, Daly scored on his return from a one match suspension following a successful appeal, in a 3–1 loss against Wimbledon, resulting in Stockport County's relegation. At the end of the 2001–02 season, Daly went on to make fourteen appearances and scoring two times in all competitions.

By the start of the 2002–03 season, Daly was regarded as one of Division 2's most promising strikers by the BBC Sport. He began to play more regularly in the first team for Stockport County and formed a striking partnership with Aaron Wilbraham. On 1 October 2002, Daly scored his first goal of the season for the club, in a 2–1 loss against Gillingham. He added two more goals by the end of October, scoring against Luton Town and Crewe Alexandra. Daly then scored against Cheltenham Town and Oldham Athletic on 8 February 2003 and 15 February 2003 respectively. On 12 April 2003, he scored a winning goal from a penalty, in a 2–1 win against Plymouth Argyle and was named the Nationwide Second Division Team of the Week. Despite being out with injuries, Daly ended his 2002–03 season, appearing in 35 of Stockport's 46 league games and scoring seven goals.

Ahead of the 2003–04 season, Daly suffered a freak accident when he "stepped out of a golf buggy on to a piece of wood at the golf course". But Daly made a quick recovery. During this season Stockport manager, Carlton Palmer, decided against naming a goalkeeper on the bench and revealed that he was planning to use Daly in net should their keeper get sent off or injured. However, this never occurred and he never made an appearance in net. Daly continued to form a striking partnership with Wilbraham but he struggled to score goals regularly in the first half of the season. Daly then spent away from Stockport County's first team because of his international commitment, as well as, his own injury concern and suspension. On 30 September 2003, he came on as a 71st-minute substitute, only for him to receive a straight red card 11 minutes later, in a 2–0 loss against Oldham Athletic. On 28 February 2004, Daly returned to the starting line–up following his recall from a loan spell at Bury, in a 1–1 draw against Brighton & Hove Albion. Since returning to the club, he regained his first team place, forming a striking partnership with Rickie Lambert and Wilbraham. On 16 March 2004, Daly then scored his first goal of the season for the club, in a 2–2 draw against Hartlepool United. On 1 May 2004, he helped Stockport County avoid relegation in the Second Division after beating Bournemouth 2–0. At the end of the 2003–04 season, Daly went on to make twenty–seven appearances and scoring three times in all competitions.

At the start of the 2004–05 season, however, Daly suffered a knee injury that saw him miss the first two league matches. On 21 August 2004, he returned from injury, coming on as a 79th-minute substitute, in a 1–0 loss against Bradford City. However, his return was short–lived when Daly suffered an illness that saw him miss for two matches. On 25 September 2004, he returned from his illness, coming on as a late substitute, in a 0–0 draw against Hull City. Daly scored his first goal of the season, in a follow–up match win against Bury in the first round of the EFL Trophy. Shortly after his loan spell at Grimsby Town came to an end and had to serve a three match suspension, he returned to the first team for Stockport County against Swansea City in the second round of the FA Cup and helped the club draw 0–0 to earn a replay. Daly scored against Hartlepool United and Milton Keynes Dons (twice) on 11 December 2004 and 18 December 2004 respectively. Since returning to the first team, Daly received a first team run ins for Stockport County until he left the club in February 2005. By the time Daly left the club, he made eighteen appearances and scoring four times in all competitions.

==== Loan Spells from Stockport County ====
In January 2004, Daly joined Bury on a month's loan. On 3 January 2004, he made his debut for the club, starting the whole game, in a 2–1 loss against Lincoln City. In a follow–up match against Swansea City, Daly scored his first goal for Bury, in a 2–0 win. He then became a first team regular for the club, starting in the next five matches. Along the way, Daly's loan spell with Bury was extended for another month. On 21 February 2004, he received a red card for a second bookable offence, in a 1–1 draw against Oxford United, in what turned out to be his last appearance for the club. Shortly after, Stockport County manager Sammy McIlroy recalled Daly back to his parent club. By the time he returned to his parent club, Daly made seven appearances and scoring once in all competitions for Bury.

On 23 October 2004, Daly went on loan to Grimsby Town for a month. On the same day, he scored on his debut for the club against Chester City, in a 2–1 loss. In November 2004, however, Daly was sent off in the 37th minute for elbowing Ian Baraclough, in a 2–0 loss against Scunthorpe United, in what turned out to be his last appearance for Grimsby Town. Shortly after, he returned to Stockport County.

=== Hartlepool United ===
On 4 February 2005, Daly signed for Hartlepool United for an undisclosed fee, which believed to be worth £30,000. Upon joining the club, he felt it was the right time to leave Stockport County.

On 15 February 2005, Daly made his Hartlepool United debut, starting a match and played 74 minutes before being substituted, in a 3–2 loss against Luton Town. Since joining the club, he found himself competing in a striker position with Joel Porter, Eifion Williams and Adam Boyd. In the last game of the season against Bournemouth, Daly scored his first goal for Hartlepool United and the game finished in a 2–2 draw, helping the club earn a play-off spot. He played in both legs of the semi–final play–offs against Tranmere Rovers and helped Hartlepool United reach the final after the club win 6–5 in a penalty shootout following a 2–2 draw throughout 120 minutes. In the League 1 Play-off Final against Sheffield Wednesday, Daly's most important goal came against the opposition team when he scored with his first touch after coming on as a substitute to put Hartlepool United in the lead, but the club would later end up losing that match, though the goal will be remembered as the goal that almost sent them into the Championship. At the end of the 2004–05 season, Daly went on to make twelve appearances and scoring two times in all competitions.

Ahead of the 2005–06 season, Daly found himself competing for the first team place in the striker position after Hartlepool United made new signings. On 13 August 2005, he scored his first goal of the season, in a 1–0 win against Doncaster Rovers. However, Daly suffered a hip injury that saw him miss two matches. On 1 October 2005, he returned to the starting line–up from injury, in a 1–0 win against Bristol City. Since returning to the first team from injury, Daly found his playing time, coming from the substitute bench and struggled to hold down a first team spot, along with his goal scoring form. By the time he was loaned out to Bury in March, Daly went on to make thirty–three appearances and scoring four times in all competitions.

Daly appeared once for Hartlepool United in the opening game of the 2006–07 season, but he was out throughout August, due to competing for the first team place in the striker position. On 1 September 2006, Daly scored a winning goal on his return from injury, in a 2–1 win against Boston United. Following this, he regained his first team place, playing in the striker position. Daly cemented his place in the club's record books with a remarkable scoring spree of seven goals in a week (three games), including his first hat-trick of his professional career against Wrexham on 30 September 2006. For his performance, he was named September's League Papers player of the month. On 20 October 2006, Daly was sent–off in the 18th minute for "an innocuous challenge" on a foul on David Artell, in a 2–1 loss against Chester City. But his suspension was rescinded after local newspaper The Northern Echo reported that "Tyne-Tees Television supplied enhanced footage of the incident which highlighted his innocence" and he was free to play in the next match. On 26 December 2006, Daly scored his ninth goal of the season, in a 2–0 win against Grimsby Town after spending almost three months without scoring. By the time he left Hartlepool United in January, Daly made twenty–three appearances and scoring nine times in all competitions.

==== Loan Spell at Bury ====
On 17 March 2006, Daly joined Bury for the second time, on loan until the end of the season. The following year, he scored on his second debut for the club, in a 2–1 loss against Grimsby Town. Two weeks later on 1 April 2006, Daly scored the only goal of the game, in a 1–0 win against his former club, Stockport County. During his second spell at Bury, he went on to make eleven appearances and scoring two times in all competitions. Following this, Daly returned to his parent club.

=== Dundee United ===
On 5 January 2007, Daly was allowed to join Scottish Premier League side Dundee United on a two–year contract for an undisclosed fee.

==== 2006–07 season ====
On 13 January 2007, he made his debut for the club, starting the whole game, in a 5–0 loss against Rangers. Since joining Dundee United, Daly became the club's first choice striker but he struggled to score in the first two months there. On 31 March 2007, Daly scored his first goal for Dundee United, in a 1–1 draw against the defending league champions Celtic. After the match, Daly's performance was praised by manager Craig Levein, describing him as "tireless up front and a lot of people don't see all the work he does."

However, in early May 2007, Daly suffered a posterior cruciate ligament injury, ruling him out for around six months, which saw him miss the start of the 2007–08 season. At the end of the 2006–07 season, he went on to make eleven appearances and scoring two times in all competitions.

==== 2007–08 season ====
At the start of the 2007–08 season, Daly says he's making his return to Dundee United's first team within the next six weeks. By October, Daly made progress on his road to recovery and appeared four times as an unused substitute throughout the month. On 10 November 2007, he made his first appearance of the season against Kilmarnock and played 88 minutes before being substituted, in a 2–0 win. In a follow–up match, however, Daly suffered ankle injury in the 24th minute and was substituted, in a 2–2 draw against Hibernian. After the match, he was out for two months, with manager Levein's expectations of his return would happen in the New Year.

However, the New Year has passed and Daly still recovering from his injury, eventually delaying his return to two months. On 12 March 2008, he played his first match in five months, coming on as an 83rd-minute substitute for Craig Conway, in a 0–0 draw against Celtic. Since returning from injury, however, Daly found his playing time, coming from the substitute and often playing out of position and continued to struggle scoring goals for the rest of the season. At the end of the 2007–08 season, he went on to make nine appearances in all competitions.

==== 2008–09 season ====
Ahead of the 2008–09 season, Manager Levein said about Daly's return, saying "he had not have a chance to put together a run of games and bed down into the team" and "was impressed with his physical dimension to Dundee United's attack", believing that he "would help the club flying when the new season kicks off." On 28 August 2006, Daly scored his first hat-trick for Dundee United's career, in a 5–0 win against Cowdenbeath in the second round of the Scottish League Cup. After the match, Daly said he vowed to be a first team regular once again despite facing new competitions in the striker position. Daly then scored against Heart of Midlothian and Inverness Caledonian Thistle on 27 September 2008 and 4 October 2008 respectively.

However, Daly suffered a groin injury that saw him miss three matches. On 15 November 2008, he returned from injury, coming on as a 66th-minute substitute, in a 2–0 loss against Kilmarnock. Since returning from injury, Daly's form dropped badly, due to his playing time coming from the substitute bench and often playing out of position, but he made several starts at times, forming a striking partnership with Francisco Sandaza. Daly, once again, then scored against St Mirren (twice) and Inverness Caledonian Thistle on 29 November 2008 and 6 December 2008 respectively. On 23 December 2008, he signed a three-year contract extension with the club, keeping him until 2012.

On 4 April 2009, however, Daly injured both his anterior and posterior cruciate ligaments after he received a tackle from Chris Hogg and was substituted in the 5th minute of the game, in a 2–2 draw against Hibernian. After the match, Daly was expected to be ruled out of action for "at least 12 months", although he was later expected to return "within half that timeframe". In Dundee United's first match since his absent, teammate Conway scored a goal, in a 1–0 win over Hamilton Academical on 11 April 2009 and said he dedicated his goal to Daly. At the end of the 2008–09 season, he went on to make twenty–seven appearances and scoring nine times in all competitions.

==== 2009–10 season ====
The first three months to the 2009–10 season saw Daly continuing to recover from his injury. By November, he made his return to training from injury. On 22 November 2009, Daly made his first appearance of the season against Celtic when he came on as a 73rd-minute substitute and scored an equalising goal, which Dundee United eventually won 2–1. After the match, manager Levein praised Daly's return, saying he was happier to be back and absolutely thrilled on the pitch after he has been out for seven or eight months and played 30 minutes of football. This was followed up by scoring in a 2–2 draw against Motherwell.

Since returning to the first team in late November, Daly found himself alternating between a substitute bench and starting line–up role, forming a striking partnership with Sandaza or David Goodwillie. His goal scoring form continued in January when he scored five goals, with a hat-trick victory against Falkirk, St Johnstone and Kilmarnock on 24 January 2010, 27 January 2010 and 30 January 2010 respectively. On 20 March 2010, Daly scored two opening goals in the first-half against Aberdeen, as the match eventually ended in a 2–2 draw. He then scored against Hibernian and St Johnstone on 31 March 2010 and 5 April 2010 respectively.

After helping the club beat Raith Rovers in the semi–finals of the Scottish Cup final, Daly commented about Dundee United's target is by winning the tournament to ensure the club's qualification for the UEFA Europa League next season. In a follow–up match against Motherwell on 18 April 2010, he scored twice, in a 3–2 win. In the final against Ross County, Daly started the whole game when he helped Dundee United win 3–0 as champions, fulfilling his target for the club as promised. At the end of the 2009–10 season, Daly went finished the season as Dundee United's top scorer with thirteen goals in twenty–nine appearances in all competitions.

==== 2010–11 season ====
Dundee United manager Peter Houston subsequently named Daly as the new Dundee United's captain for the 2010–11 season. In the opening game of the season, he scored his first goal of the season, in a 1–1 draw against St Mirren. Daly made his European debut and started the whole game as captain, as the club lose 1–0 against Greek side AEK Athens in the first leg of the UEFA Europa League play–off round. In the return leg, he scored his first European goal with an equaliser, in a 1–1 draw but it wasn't enough for Dundee United, as the club loss 2–1 on aggregate and was out of the tournament. Daly said while his goal couldn't save the Dundee United's European campaign that could have seen the club play in the group stage, he felt their performances should have been much better.

On 11 September 2010, Daly captained Dundee United for the second time this season against Aberdeen and scored his third goal of the season, in a 3–1 win. Three weeks later on 2 October 2010, he scored his fourth goal of the season, in a 2–1 win against Kilmarnock. However, on 17 October 2010, Daly suffered a head injury that "left him lying in a pool of blood and had stitches put in a three-inch gash above a painful black eye" but he kept on playing throughout the match, in a loss 2–1 against Celtic. But Daly recovered and returned to the starting line–up, in a 2–1 loss against Motherwell on 23 October 2010. On 29 December 2010, Daly played in a centre–back position for the first time following the injury of first choice centre–back Garry Kenneth, and helped Dundee United draw 2–2 draw against Hibernian. On 22 January 2011, however, he received a red card in the 65th minute after "elbowing in an aerial battle with Conor Sammon", leading to his sending off, in a 1–1 draw against Kilmarnock on 22 January 2011.

After serving a one match suspension, Daly scored on his return, in a 3–0 win against Hibernian. This was followed up by scoring in a 3–1 win against Hamilton Academical in the last 16 of the Scottish Cup. However, his return was short–lived when he suffered a hernia injury that expected him to be out until April. On 10 March 2011, Daly returned from injury, coming on as a 74th-minute substitute, and scored a last minute winner, in a 2–1 win against Hamilton Academical. In a follow–up match against Motherwell in the last 16 of the Scottish Cup, he scored an equalising goal, in a 2–2 draw to ensure the match goes to a replay. Daly also resumed playing in a centre–back position at times for the rest of the season. He later scored four more goals in the last three remaining matches of the season, including a hat-trick victory against Motherwell.

Despite the other injury concerns that Daly faced throughout the season, he continued to form a striking partnership with Goodwillie, as well as, retaining his leadership as captain. At the end of the 2010–11 season, Daly went on to make thirty–eight appearances and scoring twelve times in all competitions.

==== 2011–12 season ====
At the start of the 2011–12 season, Daly provided an assist for Goodwillie before he scored his first goal of the season, from the penalty spot, as Dundee United won 3–2 against Polish side Śląsk Wrocław in the UEFA Europa League Second qualifying round, but the club was eliminated from the competition through away goals. He then scored against Heart of Midlothian and St Mirren on 31 July 2011 and 6 August 2011 respectively. On 8 August 2011, Daly signed a contract extension with Dundee United, keeping him until 2013.

However, Daly suffered a knee injury and was expected to be out for a month, but he returned to full training three weeks later. After missing two matches, Daly returned to the first team, coming on as a 69th-minute substitute and scored two minutes later, in a 3–1 win against Inverness Caledonian Thistle on 17 September 2011. The next three matches saw him score against Airdrie United, Hibernian (brace) and Motherwell on 20 September 2011, 24 September 2011 and 1 October 2011 respectively. Since returning from injury, he continued to form a striking partnership with Johnny Russell, as well as, retaining his leadership as the club's captain. Daly then scored against Hibernian (brace), St Mirren and Aberdeen (his 50th goal for Dundee United) on 24 December 2011, 28 December 2011 and 2 January 2012 respectively.

He added three more goals throughout February, scoring against St. Johnstone, Kilmarnock and Hearts on 11 February 2012, 21 February 2012 and 25 February 2012 respectively. On 17 March 2012, Daly scored in a 2–1 win against Rangers on 17 March 2012. He then scored against Dunfermline Athletic (brace) and Aberdeen on 31 March 2012 and 7 April 2012 respectively. For his performance, Daly was awarded the Scottish Premier League's Player of the Month award for March, in which, he described his form as "the best form of his career" at the club. Shortly after winning the Player of the Month award, Daly was nominated for the PFA Scotland player of the year award, but he lost out to Charlie Mulgrew. Nevertheless, Daly was named PFA Scotland SPL Team of the Year.

On the last game of the season against Motherwell, Daly scored his 22nd goal of the season, in a 2–0 win, finishing the season as Dundee United's top–scorer. Having become a crucial part of the team and gained himself the club captaincy throughout the 2011–12 season, he went on to make forty–three appearances and scoring twenty–two goals in all competitions.

==== 2012–13 season ====
At the start of the 2012–13 season, Daly provided an assist for Keith Watson in the UEFA Europa League qualifying third round tie, against Dynamo Moscow, in a 2–2 draw. However, he was unable to help Dundee United overturn the deficit in the return leg, as the club loss 5–0, eliminating them from the tournament as a result of a 7–2 loss on aggregate. Daly started the season well when he scored two goals throughout August against Hibernian and Kilmarnock. On 1 September 2012, however, Daly suffered a knee injury and was substituted in the 57th minute, in a 0–0 draw against St. Johnstone.

On 22 September 2012, he returned to the first team from a two weeks absent following a knee injury, coming on as a 58th-minute substitute, in a 3–0 loss against Hearts. Following his return from injury, Daly continued to form a striking partnership with Johnny Russell, as well as, retaining his leadership as Dundee United's captain. Daly also began to play in the centre–back position, playing three times throughout October when he was asked to cover by manager Houston following a shortage of centre–backs. Daly started two more consecutive times in the centre–back position, coming against Motherwell and Hibernian on 19 February 2013 and 24 February 2013 respectively.

He later scored nine goals in all competitions by the end of the year, including three braces against Kilmarnock, Stranraer and Inverness Caledonian Thistle. Daly provided a double assist for Russell before he scored a goal for himself, in a 3–0 win against Rangers in the fifth round of the Scottish Cup. Daly scored three more goals throughout April, including a brace against Celtic in the semi–finals of the Scottish Cup. Despite suffering injuries on three more occasions later in the 2012–13 season, he went on to make forty–four appearances and scoring fifteen times in all competitions and finished as the club's second top-scorer behind Johnny Russell.

In the final year of his contract, Daly announced he would be leaving Dundee United at the end of the season, ending his six years spell at the club. As a result, he was linked with a move to League Two side Fleetwood Town. On 19 May 2013, Daly's exit from Dundee United was confirmed when he agreed a two-year deal with Rangers.

=== Rangers ===
On 24 May 2013, Daly agreed to join Rangers on a free transfer once the club's transfer ban lifted on 1 September 2013. On 4 March 2013, Rangers announced they would make a move to sign Daly on a pre-contract deal, with the manager Ally McCoist later confirming his interest in signing him. The move meant he would become the first Catholic player from the Republic of Ireland to sign for Rangers. McCoist himself said that he had no problem with Daly's religion or place of birth.

==== 2013–14 season ====
Ahead of the 2013–14 season, Daly scored his first goal for Rangers as a trialist in a pre-season friendly against FC Emmen. He made his debut for the club as a trialist, starting the whole game, in a 4–1 win against Brechin City in the opening game of the season. After receiving criticism for not scoring the first two league matches despite being registered as a trialist until September, Daly scored his first competitive goals for Rangers in a 6–0 away victory against Airdrieonians on 23 August 2013. Since joining the club, he formed a striking partnership with Nicky Clark in the first team.

On 28 September 2013, he scored four times in an 8–0 victory over Stenhousemuir. Daly scored against Brechin City, East Fife (hat–trick), Stenhousemuir (a win that secured McCoist's first final as manager since taking over from Walter Smith in 2011), Airdrieonians (twice), Dunfermline Athletic, Airdrieonians and Arbroath on 19 October 2013, 26 October 2013, 29 October 2013, 1 November 2013, 6 November 2013, 9 November 2013 and 25 November 2013 respectively. He then played a role of assisting goals against Dunfermline Athletic (twice), Airdrieonians and Stenhousemuir (twice) on 30 December 2013, 2 January 2014 and 5 January 2014 respectively.

Daly scored against Arbroath, Brechin City, Ayr United, Stenhousemuir and Stranraer on 25 January 2014, 1 February 2014, 15 February 2014, 22 February 2014 and 25 February 2014 respectively. He helped Rangers claim the League One title and then helped the club go on a season unbeaten throughout the season. Daly started in the Scottish Challenge Cup final against Raith Rovers and played 120 minutes, as Rangers, however, loss 1–0.

Despite not being on the starting line–up on four occasions throughout the 2013–14 season, he went on to make forty–four appearances and twenty–five appearances in all competitions. For his performance, Daly was named PFA Scotland Scottish League One Team of the Year. Daly was also nominated for the PFA Scotland League One player of the year award but he lost out to Lee Wallace.

==== 2014–15 season ====
However, Daly was ruled out for six weeks at the start of the 2014–15 season with a knee injury that required surgery. By late–August, he recovered from a knee injury and returned to training. On 12 September 2014, Daly returned from injury, coming on as a 78th-minute substitute, in a 4–0 win against Raith Rovers. Since returning to the first team, however, he found his playing time, coming from the substitute bench and faced new competitions from the striker position, such as, Kenny Miller and Kris Boyd. Between 18 October 2014 and 21 October 2014, he scored three goals in two matches in all competitions, including a brace against Raith Rovers. However, he continued to be plagued with injuries on three separate occasions and was eventually out for the rest of the season. At the end of the 2014–15 season, Daly went on to make thirty–two appearances and scoring four times in all competitions.

On 29 May 2015, Daly confirmed that he had left Rangers and was a free agent. Upon leaving the club, Daly was later critical of Rangers' new chairman Dave King for "savaging out of contract players over failing to get out of the Championship".

=== Raith Rovers ===
Following his release by Rangers, Daly was linked with a move back to Dundee United and Hibernian. He signed a short-term contract with Raith Rovers on 24 August 2015.

The next day, Daly made his debut for the club, coming on as a 70th-minute substitute, in a 2–1 win against Hamilton Academical. On 24 October 2015, he scored his first goal for Raith Rovers, in a 2–1 loss to Hibernian. Since joining the club, Daly became a first choice striker and formed a striking partnership with either Mark Stewart and Craig Wighton. By the time he left Raith Rovers, Daly made nineteen appearances and scoring once in all competitions.

== International career ==
Having represented Republic of Ireland starting from U14, U15 to Republic of Ireland U16, Daly received his first call up for the Republic of Ireland U19 squad in July 2001. On 5 November 2001, he scored twice on his U19 national team debut, in a 3–0 win against Latvia U19. His involvement for the U19 national side saw Republic of Ireland U19 qualify for the UEFA European Under-19 Championship in Norway, including a brace against Croatia U19. His talent was recognised when he picked up Republic of Ireland's 2001 Youth Player of the Year award.

In May 2002, Daly was called up to the Republic of Ireland U20 squad for the first time ahead of the Toulon Tournament. He played three times in the tournament, as the U20 national side were eliminated in the group stage. Two months later, Daly was called up to the Republic of Ireland U19 squad for the UEFA European Under-19 Championship in Norway. On 22 July 2002, he scored twice for the U19 national side, in a 2–1 win against Belgium U19. This was followed up by scoring in a 3–2 victory over England U19 that saw Republic of Ireland U19 qualify for the semi–finals. However, Daly started the whole game in the semi–finals against Slovakia U19, as the U19 national side loss 2–1.

In March 2002, Daly was called up to the Republic of Ireland U21 for the first time. On 26 March 2002, he made his debut for the U21 national side, coming on in the 70th minute in a 3–2 win against Denmark U21. On 20 August 2002, Daly scored his first goal for Republic of Ireland U21, in a 1–0 win against Finland U21. He was hailed by Niall Quinn as his successor to the Republic of Ireland's front line in Niall Quinn: The Autobiography. Daly responded to Quinn's claim, saying: "It's very nice when people say things like that, but you have to take them with a pinch of salt. For everyone who says something good about you, there will be someone ready to say something bad." In October 2003, he was called up to the FIFA World Youth Championship in UAE. Daly went on to play at the 2003 FIFA World Youth Championship, playing in two of Republic of Ireland U21's group matches before their second round exit. Following this, Daly went on to make seven appearances and scoring once in all competitions for the U21 national side.

In October 2010, Daly said about his hopes of getting called up to the Republic of Ireland squad, using Anthony Stokes as an example, but this never happened.

== Coaching career ==
=== Heart of Midlothian ===
On 4 November 2015, Daly agreed to join Hearts as coach of their under-20 team when his contract with Raith Rovers expired in January 2016. Upon doing so, he announced his retirement from professional football. Daly revealed that he has a UEFA B Licence and intended to finish his UEFA A Licence the following year. After playing two matches for Raith Rovers in January, he started his coaching job at Hearts. Following Robbie Neilson's departure, Daly was announced as joint interim manager of Heart of Midlothian with Andy Kirk. The pair coached their first match as manager of the club, in a 2–2 draw Ross County on 3 December 2016. Daly went back to his previous role after Ian Cathro was appointed as new manager of Hearts.

Daly was again placed in interim charge of the first team at Hearts on 2 August 2017, after the departure of Ian Cathro. Following his first match as an interim manager at the club came in a 4–1 loss against Celtic three days later, he was criticised manager Brendan Rodgers after he made comments about Hearts, regarding the sacking of Ian Cathro. Daly coached the club four more matches throughout August until his former manager Craig Levein took the manager role instead. Following the appointment of Levein, he went back to his previous role. It was later revealed that Daly was considered for the manager but Hearts' chairwoman Ann Budge was reluctant to choose him, citing as a "poisoned chalice". Five months later, he later reflected on his experience as the club's interim manager, saying it was an "enjoyment experience". Daly left Hearts in January 2020, soon after the appointment of Daniel Stendel as head coach.

=== TPS Turku ===
On 30 October 2020, Daly joined TPS Turku as assistant manager to Jonatan Johansson. He also became manager of the under-23 team. It was announced in December 2021 that Daly had left the club by mutual agreement to return home for family reasons.

=== St Patrick's Athletic ===
On 20 December 2021, it was announced that Daly had returned to Dublin to become assistant manager of League of Ireland Premier Division side St Patrick's Athletic under newly appointed manager Tim Clancy, who he had played against during his playing career in Scotland, as well as completing his coaching badges alongside Clancy.

On 2 May 2023, Daly was announced as interim manager following Tim Clancy's sacking by the club. On 22 May 2023, Daly was named as permanent manager of St Patrick's Athletic, after winning 3 out of his 4 games in charge during his spell as interim manager.

On 12 November 2023, Daly won his first piece of silverware as a manager when his Pats side won the 2023 FAI Cup Final, beating rivals Bohemians 3–1 in front of a record breaking FAI Cup Final crowd of 43,881 at the Aviva Stadium.

On 7 May 2024, it was announced that Daly had been relieved of his duties as manager with the club in 7th place following 7 defeats in their opening 15 games of the 2024 season.

=== Dundalk ===
On 23 May 2024, he was appointed manager of bottom of the table League of Ireland Premier Division club Dundalk. On 5 September 2024, after a 2–1 defeat at home to his old club St Patrick's Athletic, with the club still rooted to the bottom of the table with 7 games left to play, Daly confirmed that players and staff at the club had not been paid amid financial uncertainty at ownership level of the club. On 21 September 2024, Daly stated that he would not have accepted the job in May if he had been told the truth about the club's financial situation at the time, also stating that he would be unlikely to stay at the club if they were to be relegated at the end of the season. On 18 October 2024, Dundalk were relegated following a 2–0 defeat at home to Derry City, with Daly confirming after the match that he would leaving the club after their final two games of the season.

=== Galway United ===
On 9 August 2025, Daly was announced as assistant manager of Galway United on a short-term basis under manager John Caulfield, replacing Ollie Horgan who had left the club due to health issues, before passing away just weeks later. He helped the club maintain their League of Ireland Premier Division status by avoiding the relegation play-off spot on the final day of the season in November.

=== Waterford ===
On 16 November 2025, Daly was announced as First-Team Head Coach of League of Ireland Premier Division club Waterford. 4 days later he appointed Richard Foster, a teammate of his from during their playing careers, as his assistant manager. On 2 May 2026, it was announced that Daly had been sacked with the club rooted to the bottom of the table without a win 13 games into the season, with his only victories coming in the Munster Senior Cup.

== Personal life ==
Growing up, Daly had known Seán Dillon since they were young and "grew up together on the streets of Dublin and were team-mates at Cherry Orchard throughout their teenage years". They were reunited when they joined Dundee United in January 2007 and were teammates at the club for six years. He also grew supporting Manchester United.

Daly is married to Linda and has two daughters. Since moving to Scotland, he resided with his family. During his time as the TPS Turku's assistant manager, Daly learned the Finnish language. Though he was described as the first Irish Catholic to join Rangers, Daly is not religious and believes that the media coverage of that transfer was exaggerated.

== Career statistics ==
=== Playing career ===
Appearances and goals by national team and year
| Club | Season | League | | | National cup | | League cup | | Continental | | Total | |
| Club | Season | Division | Apps | Goals | Apps | Goals | Apps | Goals | Apps | Goals | Apps | Goals |
|---|---|---|---|---|---|---|---|---|---|---|---|---|
| Stockport County | 1999–2000 | First Division | 4 | 0 | – | | – | | – | | 4 | 0 |
| Stockport County | 2000–01 | First Division | – | | – | | 1 | 0 | – | | 1 | 0 |
| Stockport County | 2001–02 | First Division | 13 | 1 | 1 | 1 | – | | – | | 14 | 2 |
| Stockport County | 2002–03 | Second Division | 35 | 7 | – | | 1 | 1 | – | | 36 | 8 |
| Stockport County | 2003–04 | Second Division | 25 | 3 | 1 | 0 | 1 | 0 | – | | 27 | 3 |
| Stockport County | 2004–05 | League One | 14 | 3 | 2 | 0 | 1 | 0 | – | | 17 | 3 |
| Stockport County | Total | | 91 | 14 | 4 | 1 | 4 | 1 | 0 | 0 | 99 | 16 |
| Bury (loan) | 2003–04 | Third Division | 7 | 1 | – | | – | | – | | 7 | 1 |
| Grimsby Town (loan) | 2004–05 | League Two | 3 | 1 | – | | – | | – | | 3 | 1 |
| Hartlepool United | 2004–05 | League One | 12 | 1 | – | | – | | 3 | 1 | 15 | 2 |
| Hartlepool United | 2005–06 | League One | 30 | 2 | 1 | 0 | 2 | 2 | – | | 33 | 4 |
| Hartlepool United | 2006–07 | League Two | 19 | 9 | 3 | 0 | 1 | 0 | 2 | 0 | 25 | 9 |
| Hartlepool United | Total | | 61 | 12 | 4 | 0 | 3 | 2 | 5 | 1 | 73 | 15 |
| Bury (loan) | 2005–06 | League Two | 11 | 2 | – | | – | | – | | 11 | 2 |
| Dundee United | 2006–07 | Scottish Premier League | 11 | 2 | 2 | 0 | – | | – | | 13 | 2 |
| Dundee United | 2007–08 | Scottish Premier League | 9 | 0 | – | | – | | – | | 9 | 0 |
| Dundee United | 2008–09 | Scottish Premier League | 23 | 5 | 2 | 1 | 2 | 3 | – | | 27 | 9 |
| Dundee United | 2009–10 | Scottish Premier League | 23 | 13 | 6 | 0 | – | | – | | 29 | 13 |
| Dundee United | 2010–11 | Scottish Premier League | 29 | 9 | 5 | 2 | 2 | 0 | 2 (Note: Appearances in UEFA Europa League) | 1 | 38 | 12 |
| Dundee United | 2011–12 | Scottish Premier League | 36 | 19 | 3 | 0 | 2 | 2 | 2 | 1 | 43 | 22 |
| Dundee United | 2012–13 | Scottish Premier League | 36 | 10 | 4 | 5 | 2 | 0 | 2 | 0 | 44 | 15 |
| Dundee United | Total | | 157 | 58 | 22 | 8 | 8 | 5 | 6 | 2 | 193 | 73 |
| Rangers | 2013–14 | Scottish League One | 34 | 20 | 6 | 3 | 0 | 0 | 4 | 2 | 44 | 25 |
| Rangers | 2014–15 | Scottish Championship | 19 | 3 | 3 | 0 | 4 | 0 | 2 | 1 | 28 | 4 |
| Rangers | Total | | 53 | 23 | 9 | 3 | 4 | 0 | 6 | 3 | 72 | 29 |
| Raith Rovers | 2015–16 | Scottish Championship | 15 | 1 | 2 | 0 | 2 | 0 | 0 | 0 | 19 | 1 |
| Career total | | | 398 | 112 | 41 | 12 | 21 | 8 | 17 | 6 | 477 | 138 |

=== Managerial career ===
As of match played 1 May 2026

Managerial record by team and tenure
| Team | From | To | Record | | | | | | | |
| Team | From | To | G | W | D | L | GF | GA | GD | Win % |
|---|---|---|---|---|---|---|---|---|---|---|
| Heart of Midlothian (interim) | 2 December 2016 | 5 December 2016 | 1 | 0 | 1 | 0 | 2 | 2 | +0 | 0.00 |
| Heart of Midlothian (interim) | 2 August 2017 | 28 August 2017 | 4 | 1 | 1 | 2 | 3 | 6 | −3 | 25.00 |
| St Patrick's Athletic | 2 May 2023 | 7 May 2024 | 49 | 25 | 8 | 16 | 75 | 54 | +21 | 51.02 |
| Dundalk | 23 May 2024 | 2 November 2024 | 21 | 3 | 5 | 13 | 15 | 29 | −14 | 14.29 |
| Waterford | 16 November 2025 | 2 May 2026 | 16 | 2 | 5 | 9 | 17 | 30 | −13 | 12.50 |
| Total | | | 91 | 31 | 20 | 40 | 112 | 121 | −9 | 34.07 |

== Honours ==
=== As a player ===
Dundee United

- Scottish Cup: 2010

Rangers

- Scottish League One: 2014

Individual

- FAI Republic of Ireland Youths Player of the Year: 2001

=== As a manager ===
St Patrick's Athletic

- FAI Cup: 2023
