= Ross Smith (Scottish footballer) =

Scottish footballer

Personal information
- Full name: Ross Smith
- Date of birth: 21 February 1992 (age 34)
- Place of birth: Glasgow, Scotland
- Position: Defender

Team information
- Current team: Pollok

Youth career
- Westerton United
- Dundee United

Senior career*
Years	Team	Apps	(Gls)
2008–2014	Dundee United	1	(0)
2012	→ Peterhead (loan)	8	(0)
2012–2013	→ Peterhead (loan)	31	(1)
2013–2014	→ Stenhousemuir (loan)	14	(1)
2014–2015	Peterhead	20	(0)
2015–2018	Stirling Albion	59	(6)
2018–2021	BSC Glasgow	38	(3)
2021–2022	Kilwinning Rangers	?	(?)
2022-2023	St Cadoc's	?	(?)
2023-2024	Broomhill	?	(?)
2024-	Pollok		

International career^{‡}
2007–2008	Scotland U16	5	(0)
2008–2009	Scotland U17	11	(1)
2010	Scotland U19	2	(0)
- * Club domestic league appearances and goals as of 11:19, 26 June 2022 (UTC) ‡ National team caps and goals as of 19:28, 6 September 2011 (UTC)

Ross Smith (born 21 February 1992, in Glasgow) is a Scottish footballer who plays as a defender for West of Scotland side Pollok. His previous clubs include Dundee United, Peterhead, Stenhousemuir, Stirling Albion, Kilwinning Rangers and St Cadoc's.

== Club career ==
Smith was born in Glasgow and attended Boclair Academy in Bearsden, East Dunbartonshire. He joined Dundee United at under-14 level.

Having featured regularly and captained Dundee United's under-19 side during the 2009–10 season, Smith made his professional debut on 13 February 2010 as a substitute in a Scottish Premier League match against St Mirren. Despite being an unused substitute frequently during the 2010–11 season and being on the bench for their Europa League qualifier against Śląsk Wrocław, Smith failed to make a further first team appearance. On 10 February 2012, he joined Scottish Third Division side Peterhead on a month's loan deal. After the summer, his loan was extended for a further full season. On 9 August 2013, Smith joined Scottish League One side Stenhousemuir until the January transfer window, with an option to extend the deal until the end of the season.

In January 2014, Smith left Dundee United by mutual consent, returning to Peterhead and this time signing a permanent six-month contract. After eighteen months with Peterhead, Smith signed for recently relegated Stirling Albion in June 2015. Smith spent three years at Forthbank, before departing the club in May 2018.

After a spell with BSC Glasgow in the Lowland League, Smith signed a three-year contract with West of Scotland League Premier Division club Kilwinning Rangers in May 2021. After one season, and a season-ending injury, Smith dropped another division to sign for WoSFL First Division side St Cadoc's.

== International career ==
Smith made his international debut for Scotland under-16s on 8 November 2007, as a substitute in a Victory Shield match against Northern Ireland. He won international caps at under-16 and under-17 level, where he captained the team six times. His last appearance for Scotland came at under-19 level, against Norway on 3 October 2010.

== Career statistics ==
As of match played 21 October 2017

Appearances and goals by club, season and competition
Club	Season	League			Scottish Cup		League Cup		Other		Total	
Club	Season	Division	Apps	Goals	Apps	Goals	Apps	Goals	Apps	Goals	Apps	Goals
Dundee United	2009–10	Premier League	1	0	0	0	0	0	0	0	1	0
Dundee United	2010–11	Premier League	0	0	0	0	0	0	0	0	0	0
Dundee United	2011–12	Premier League	0	0	0	0	0	0	0	0	0	0
Dundee United	2012–13	Premier League	0	0	0	0	0	0	0	0	0	0
Dundee United	2013–14	Premiership	0	0	0	0	0	0	0	0	0	0
Dundee United	Total		1	0	0	0	0	0	0	0	1	0
Peterhead (loan)	2011–12	Third Division	8	0	0	0	0	0	0	0	0	0
Peterhead (loan)	2012–13	Third Division	31	1	1	1	0	0	4 (Note: Appearances in the Second Division play-offs)	0	36	2
Peterhead (loan)	Total		39	1	1	1	0	0	4	0	44	2
Stenhousemuir (loan)	2013–14	League One	14	1	2	0	0	0	1 (Note: Appearances in the Scottish Challenge Cup)	0	17	1
Peterhead	2013–14	League Two	11	0	0	0	0	0	0	0	11	0
Peterhead	2014–15	League One	20	0	1	0	1	0	2	0	24	0
Peterhead	Total		31	0	1	0	1	0	2	0	35	0
Stirling Albion	2015–16	League Two	24	2	3	0	1	0	1	0	29	2
Stirling Albion	2016–17	League Two	14	2	2	0	2	0	1	0	19	2
Stirling Albion	2017–18	League Two	9	1	0	0	2	0	1	0	12	1
Stirling Albion	Total		47	5	5	0	5	0	3	0	60	5
Career Total			132	7	9	1	6	0	10	0	157	8
