= John Rankin (footballer, born 1983) =

Scottish footballer

Personal information
- Date of birth: 27 June 1983 (age 43)
- Place of birth: Bellshill, Scotland
- Position: Central midfielder

Team information
- Current team: Airdrieonians (manager)

Youth career
- Rangers SABC
- 2000–2003: Manchester United
- 2001: → Corinthians (loan)

Senior career*
Years	Team	Apps	(Gls)
2003–2006	Ross County	101	(17)
2006–2008	Inverness Caledonian Thistle	49	(9)
2008–2011	Hibernian	100	(6)
2011–2016	Dundee United	173	(12)
2016–2017	Falkirk	13	(0)
2017–2018	Queen of the South	51	(2)
2018–2020	Clyde	42	(10)
Total		529	(56)

International career
2006	Scotland B	1	(0)

Managerial career
- 2022–2025: Hamilton Academical
- 2026: Ayr United (interim)
- 2026–: Airdrieonians
- * Club domestic league appearances and goals

John Rankin (born 27 June 1983) is a Scottish professional football manager and former player who currently manages Scottish League One club Airdrieonians.

Rankin played as a central midfielder for Ross County, Inverness Caledonian Thistle, Hibernian, Dundee United, Falkirk, Queen of the South and Clyde. Rankin also played once for Scotland B in 2006.

== Playing career ==
=== Early career ===
Rankin started his career at English Premier League club Manchester United but did not make any first team appearances. Whilst at the Red Devils, he was loaned out to Corinthians, along with Ben Muirhead by Alex Ferguson, to gain experience before returning to Manchester United. However, his time there was a disaster, as he explained about how both players struggled for food whilst there:

We got up one day and had our breakfast but then ate no lunch and no dinner. The day after we had NOTHING to eat. Our next meal was lunch the following day. We hadn't eaten for two days and had been at six training sessions so it was a struggle. The other players knew where to go for food but we couldn't communicate with anyone.

Rankin also spoke about the poverty he had seen in his time in Brazil:

One of my main memories is the poverty in the place. I saw people living in wooden sheds and kids begging. The children hunted in packs for food. The kids hung lollipops over your wing mirror if you stopped at traffic lights and if you took them off they'd ask for money. That's how bad it was. I've young children myself now and it's not right for a boy of eight to have to beg. It was a reality check. I was only 18 and it was heart breaking. It really opened my eyes.

Rankin was released by Manchester United in June 2003. After unsuccessful trials with a number of Scottish Premier League clubs, Rankin signed for Scottish First Division club Ross County in 2003 and played in 101 league matches for the Dingwall club, scoring 17 goals. Rankin also received two league Player of the Year awards.

=== Inverness Caledonian Thistle ===
Rankin moved to Highland derby rivals Inverness Caledonian Thistle for a reported fee of £65,000 in 2006, making him one of several players to have played for both Highland clubs. Rankin played in 49 league matches and scored nine goals for the Caley Jags that included a stunning last minute winner against Rangers on 27 December 2006.

=== Hibernian ===
In January 2008, Rankin moved to Hibernian for a fee of £110,000. Rankin scored the opening goal in a 2–0 win for Hibs against Celtic on 7 December 2008. The goal was notable because it was scored from a yard in front of the centre circle, approximately 45 yards from the goal. The shot dipped and deceived the Celtic goalkeeper, Polish international Artur Boruc. After the game, Rankin described the shot as a "squiggler".

Rankin was a candidate for the Hibs captaincy after Rob Jones left for Scunthorpe United in the summer of 2009. New manager John Hughes decided to give the armband to Chris Hogg, however, with Ian Murray to serve as Hogg's vice captain. Rankin fell out of favour under Colin Calderwood and was told in March 2011 that his contract would not be renewed. Rankin played in 100 league matches for the Hibees and scored six goals.

=== Dundee United ===
Rankin signed a two-year contract with Dundee United on 17 May 2011. He scored five goals for United as the team finished fourth in the 2011–12 Scottish Premier League season and qualified for the 2012–13 UEFA Europa League. In June 2012, Rankin agreed an extended contract with United. He was appointed chairman of PFA Scotland in February 2013, replacing Jack Ross. On 26 February 2014, Rankin agreed a two-year contract extension. On 4 May 2016 it was announced that he would be one of eight out-of-contract players leaving the club at the end of the season, having not been offered a new contract. Rankin played in 173 league matches for Dundee United and scored 12 goals.

=== Falkirk ===
On 22 July 2016, Rankin signed for Falkirk, having spent time training with the club. Rankin left Falkirk on 5 January 2017 after the club agreed to terminate his contract. Rankin played in 13 league matches for the Bairns without scoring any goals.

=== Queen of the South ===
On 5 January 2017, Rankin joined Queen of the South on an 18-month contract, until the end of the 2017–18 season. Rankin was appointed Queens' club captain by recently appointed manager Gary Naysmith before the league match at St Mirren on 7 January 2017, taking over from previous captain Chris Higgins.

In March 2017, Rankin was appointed as the Under-17s coach at Heart of Midlothian, which he combined with his playing duties at the Doonhamers. Rankin relinquished his position as chairman of PFA Scotland in February 2018 and he departed the Dumfries club at the end of the 2017–18 season. Rankin played in 51 league matches for the Doonhamers and scored two goals.

=== Clyde ===
On 9 June 2018, Rankin signed a one-year contract with his local club Clyde. He was nominated for SPFL goal of the month in January and February 2019.

Rankin suffered a broken ankle in the penultimate league match of the season and missed the play-offs, but the club still won promotion to League One. At the PFA Scotland awards, he was shortlisted for Player of the Year and named in the Team of the Year for League Two.

During the 2018–19 season, Rankin scored nine goals in 39 appearances.

=== International career ===
Rankin represented Scotland B, in a match against Turkey B in 2006, while at Ross County.

== Managerial career ==
=== Hamilton Academical ===
Rankin joined Hamilton Academical as assistant head coach in December 2021 and was promoted to head coach on 28 June 2022, succeeding Stuart Taylor.

Despite winning the 2023 Scottish Challenge Cup final in his first season, Hamilton lost the Championship play-off final on penalties against Airdrieonians and were relegated to Scottish League One. However, under Rankin, the club secured an immediate return to the second tier after defeating Inverness Caledonian Thistle 5–3 on aggregate in the promotion play-off final.

The following season, amid financial issues, the club were issued with a 15-point deduction due to missed payments which meant Hamilton were automatically relegated to League One.

At the start of the 2025–26 season, the club were placed under a transfer embargo and lost its youth academy. In October 2025, they were found to have breached the embargo by offering payments to players which led to a fine, six-point deduction and a fraud investigation. This culminated in Rankin announcing his resignation on 29 November after four years at the club.

=== Ayr United ===
On 31 March 2026, Rankin was announced as Ayr United manager on an interim basis ahead of the final six matches of the 2025-2026 season, following the departure of Scott Brown. Rankin departed the club on 5 May, after retaining Ayr's status in the Scottish Championship for a ninth consecutive season.

=== Airdrieonians ===
Rankin was appointed Airdrieonians manager on 23 May 2026.

== Career statistics ==
=== Player ===
Appearances and goals by club, season and competition
Club	Season	League			Scottish Cup		League Cup		Other		Total	
Club	Season	Division	Apps	Goals	Apps	Goals	Apps	Goals	Apps	Goals	Apps	Goals
Ross County	2003–04	Scottish First Division	35	5	1	0	2	0	2	1	40	6
Ross County	2004–05	Scottish First Division	30	0	3	1	2	0	3	0	38	1
Ross County	2005–06	Scottish First Division	36	12	3	0	2	0	2	1	43	13
Ross County	Total		101	17	7	1	6	0	7	2	121	20
Inverness Caledonian Thistle	2006–07	Scottish Premier League	34	6	3	0	0	0	0	0	37	6
Inverness Caledonian Thistle	2007–08	Scottish Premier League	15	3	0	0	3	0	0	0	18	3
Inverness Caledonian Thistle	Total		49	9	3	0	3	0	0	0	55	9
Hibernian	2007–08	Scottish Premier League	17	2	2	0	0	0	0	0	19	2
Hibernian	2008–09	Scottish Premier League	33	3	1	0	1	0	2	0	37	3
Hibernian	2009–10	Scottish Premier League	33	0	3	0	2	0	0	0	38	0
Hibernian	2010–11	Scottish Premier League	17	1	1	0	1	0	1	0	20	1
Hibernian	Total		100	6	7	0	4	0	3	0	114	6
Dundee United	2011–12	Scottish Premier League	38	4	3	1	2	0	2	0	45	5
Dundee United	2012–13	Scottish Premier League	35	2	4	0	2	0	2	0	43	2
Dundee United	2013–14	Scottish Premiership	35	2	5	0	3	0	0	0	43	2
Dundee United	2014–15	Scottish Premiership	30	2	2	0	3	0	0	0	35	2
Dundee United	2015–16	Scottish Premiership	35	2	4	0	2	0	0	0	41	2
Dundee United	Total		173	12	18	1	12	0	4	0	207	13
Falkirk	2016–17	Scottish Championship	13	0	0	0	2	0	2	0	17	0
Queen of the South	2016–17	Scottish Championship	17	1	0	0	0	0	0	0	17	1
Queen of the South	2017–18	Scottish Championship	34	1	3	0	4	0	3	0	44	1
Queen of the South	Total		51	2	3	0	4	0	3	0	61	2
Clyde	2018–19	Scottish League One	35	9	1	0	3	0	0	0	39	9
Clyde	2019–20	Scottish League One	7	1	1	0	0	0	0	0	8	1
Clyde	Total		42	10	2	0	3	0	0	0	47	10
Career total			529	56	40	2	34	0	19	2	622	60

=== Managerial record ===
As of match played 14 November 2026

Team	From	To	Record				
Team	From	To	G	W	D	L	Win %
Hamilton Academical	28 June 2022	29 November 2025	171	72	35	64	42.11
Ayr United (interim)	31 March 2026	5 May 2026	6	1	1	4	16.67
Airdrieonians	23 May 2026	present	26	12	4	10	46.15
Total			203	85	40	78	41.87

== Honours ==
=== Club ===
Manchester United Reserves

- Premier Reserve League North: 2001–02

Ross County

- Scottish Challenge Cup runner-up: 2004–05

Dundee United

- Scottish Cup runner-up: 2013–14
- Scottish League Cup runner-up: 2014–15

Clyde

- Scottish League One play-off winners: 2018–19

Scotland U16s

- Victory Shield: 1997–98

=== Managerial ===
Hamilton Academical

- Scottish Challenge Cup winners: 2022–23
- Scottish Championship play-off winners: 2023-24

=== Individual ===
- SPFA First Division Player of the Year: 2005–06
- Scottish Football League Player of the Year: 2005–06
- PFAS League Two Team of the Year: 2018–19
- Scottish First Division Player of the Month: November 2005, January 2006
- Scottish First Division Young Player of the Month: December 2003
- SPFL League One Manager of the Month: 2023-24: August 2023

== See also ==
- List of footballers in Scotland by number of league appearances (500+)
