= Marc McCallum =

Scottish footballer (born 1993)

Personal information
- Date of birth: 27 March 1993 (age 33)
- Place of birth: Forfar, Scotland
- Position: Goalkeeper

Team information
- Current team: Forfar Athletic
- Number: 1

Youth career
- 2003–2004: Aberdeen
- 2004–2009: Dundee United

Senior career*
Years	Team	Apps	(Gls)
2009–2016	Dundee United	1	(0)
2012	→ Forfar Athletic (loan)	10	(0)
2012	→ Peterhead (loan)	6	(0)
2013	→ Berwick Rangers (loan)	18	(0)
2014–2015	→ Arbroath (loan)	25	(0)
2015	→ Livingston (loan)	11	(0)
2016	Livingston	15	(0)
2016–2017	Plymouth Argyle	0	(0)
2017–	Forfar Athletic	370	(0)

International career^{‡}
2009–2010	Scotland U17	4	(0)
2010	Scotland U19	8	(0)
- * Club domestic league appearances and goals as of 4 May 2026 ‡ National team caps and goals as of 7 June 2014

Marc McCallum (born 27 March 1993) is a Scottish footballer who plays as a goalkeeper for Scottish League Two club Forfar Athletic. He has also previously played for Dundee United and Livingston, Plymouth Argyle, as well as an earlier stint at Forfar Athletic, Peterhead, Berwick Rangers, Arbroath and Livingston on loan. He has represented Scotland at under-17 and under-19 level.

== Early life and career ==
McCallum was born in Forfar and played for Lochside Boys Club before joining Aberdeen at the age of 11. After spending eighteen months there he moved to Dundee United, later signing as a full-time professional in June 2009.

== Playing career ==
=== Club ===
Before making his debut for Dundee United, McCallum had three separate spells out on loan, firstly he moved to Forfar Athletic for three months, on 31 December 2011. During the 2012–13 season he spent time at both Peterhead and Berwick Rangers.

After spending many seasons on loan in the lower divisions or as an unused substitute, McCallum finally made his Dundee United debut on 6 May 2014, in a 3–1 Scottish Premiership defeat to Aberdeen. On 13 May 2014, he signed a new contract keeping him at the club until 2016.

On 13 November 2014, McCallum signed for Arbroath on loan. He joined Livingston on loan in September 2015, returning to Dundee United in December 2015. McCallum left Dundee United in January 2016 by mutual consent, with the player looking to further his career by seeking first-team football. Shortly after leaving Tannadice, McCallum returned to Livingston signing a short-term deal until the end of the season.

In August 2016, McCallum signed for Plymouth Argyle as third choice goalkeeper, going on to make just two appearances in the 2016–17 season, both of which were as a substitute in EFL Trophy games, both times taking the place of Vincent Dorel.

McCallum rejected a new contract from Plymouth in the summer of 2017 and signed for Scottish League One club Forfar Athletic.

== Career statistics ==
As of match played 30 October 2021

Appearances and goals by club, season and competition
Club	Season	League			National Cup		League Cup		Other		Total	
Club	Season	Division	Apps	Goals	Apps	Goals	Apps	Goals	Apps	Goals	Apps	Goals
Dundee United	2011–12	Scottish Premier League	0	0	0	0	0	0	0	0	0	0
Dundee United	2012–13	Scottish Premier League	0	0	0	0	0	0	0	0	0	0
Dundee United	2013–14	Scottish Premiership	1	0	0	0	0	0	0	0	1	0
Dundee United	2014–15	Scottish Premiership	0	0	0	0	0	0	0	0	0	0
Dundee United	2015–16	Scottish Premiership	0	0	0	0	0	0	0	0	0	0
Dundee United	Total		1	0	0	0	0	0	0	0	1	0
Forfar Athletic (loan)	2011–12	Scottish Second Division	10	0	0	0	0	0	0	0	10	0
Peterhead (loan)	2012–13	Scottish Third Division	6	0	0	0	0	0	0	0	6	0
Berwick Rangers (loan)	2012–13	Scottish Third Division	17	0	0	0	0	0	2 (Note: Appearances in the Second Division play-offs)	0	19	0
Arbroath (loan)	2014–15	Scottish League Two	25	0	2	0	0	0	2 (Note: Appearances in the League One play-offs)	0	29	0
Livingston (loan)	2015–16	Scottish Championship	11	0	1	0	0	0	1 (Note: Appearances in the Scottish Challenge Cup)	0	13	0
Livingston	2015–16	Scottish Championship	15	0	0	0	0	0	2 (Note: Appearances in the Championship play-offs)	0	17	0
Plymouth Argyle	2016–17	EFL League Two	0	0	0	0	0	0	2 (Note: Appearances in the EFL Trophy)	0	2	0
Forfar Athletic	2017–18	Scottish League One	36	0	1	0	4	0	1	0	42	0
Forfar Athletic	2018–19	Scottish League One	36	0	2	0	3	0	2	0	43	0
Forfar Athletic	2019–20	Scottish League One	28	0	1	0	5	0	1	0	35	0
Forfar Athletic	2020–21	Scottish League One	19	0	2	0	1	0	0	0	22	0
Forfar Athletic	2021–22	Scottish League Two	11	0	1	0	3	0	2	0	17	0
Forfar Athletic	Total		130	0	7	0	16	0	6	0	159	0
Career total			215	0	10	0	16	0	15	0	256	0
