= Keyline Challenge Cup Tournament =

The D&K Lafferty Cup Tournament, commonly known as the 'Oban Tournament', is a pre-season football tournament held by Oban Saints AFC in Oban, Argyll and Bute, Scotland. The tournament is played in a round-robin format of matches lasting 30 minutes and regularly attracts Scottish league clubs, with SPFL teams (previously SPL) Heart of Midlothian and Dundee United, and (previously SFL) Hamilton Academical and St Johnstone participating in 2008. The tournament was in its fifteenth year as of 2008, with the majority of teams from the previous year returning to compete again.

Previous winners include:

- 1999: Clyde
- 2000: Clyde
- 2001: Clyde
- 2002: Heart of Midlothian
- 2003: Nairn County
- 2004: Dundee United
- 2005: Dumbarton
- 2006: Heart of Midlothian
- 2007: Alloa Athletic
- 2008: Dundee United
- 2009: Alloa Athletic
- 2010: Dundee United
- 2011: Alloa Athletic
- 2012: Heart of Midlothian
- 2013: Hamilton Academical
- 2014: Hamilton Academical
- 2015: Heart of Midlothian
- 2016: Hamilton Academical
- 2017: Hamilton Academical
- 2018: Dundee United
- 2019: Hamilton Academical
