= Filip Mentel =

Slovak footballer (born 1990)

Personal information
- Date of birth: February 2, 1990 (age 36)
- Place of birth: Slovakia
- Position: Goalkeeper

Youth career
- –2007: FK Inter Bratislava
- 2007–2010: Manchester City

Senior career*
Years	Team	Apps	(Gls)
2010–2012	Dundee United	0	(0)
2011	→ Clyde (loan)	11	(0)
2013	OFK Dunajská Lužná		
2014	Svätý Jur		
2014–2016	OFK Dunajská Lužná		
2016–2017	MŠK Senec		
- * Club domestic league appearances and goals

Filip Mentel (born 2 February 1990) is a Slovak former footballer, who played as a goalkeeper. As well as his native Slovakia, Mentel played club football in Scotland, and spent time in the youth team of Manchester City.

== Early life ==
He regarded England international David Beckham as his football idol. He joined the youth academy of English Premier League side Manchester City, where he was first-choice goalkeeper for the youth side in 2010. He suffered a knee injury while playing for the club.

== Club career ==
=== Scotland ===
Mentel started his career with Scottish side Dundee United, signing a three-year contract in July 2010. In July 2011, he was sent on loan to Scottish side Clyde. He made his debut for Clyde in a 2011–12 Scottish Challenge Cup match against Berwick Rangers, which Clyde lost on penalties. Mentel subsequently left Dundee United in November 2012 without having represented the club in a first-team match.

=== Return to Slovakia ===
In 2013, Mentel signed for Slovak side OFK Dunajská Lužná. In 2014, he signed for Slovak side ŠK Svätý Jur of the Bratislava regional championship. After that, he returned to Slovak side OFK Dunajská Lužná. In 2016, he signed for Slovak side MŠK Senec.

== International career ==
Mentel represented Slovakia internationally at youth level. He played for his country from the under-15 level, all the way up to the Slovakia national under-21 football team.

== Post-playing career ==
After retiring from professional football, Mentel worked as a goalkeeper coach. After that, he worked as a football commentator.

== Personal life ==
Mentel is the son of Slovak footballer Miroslav Mentel. He met his wife, Katarina, who is also Slovak, while in Dundee. Together they have a daughter and a son.
