= Seán Dillon =

Irish footballer (born 1983)

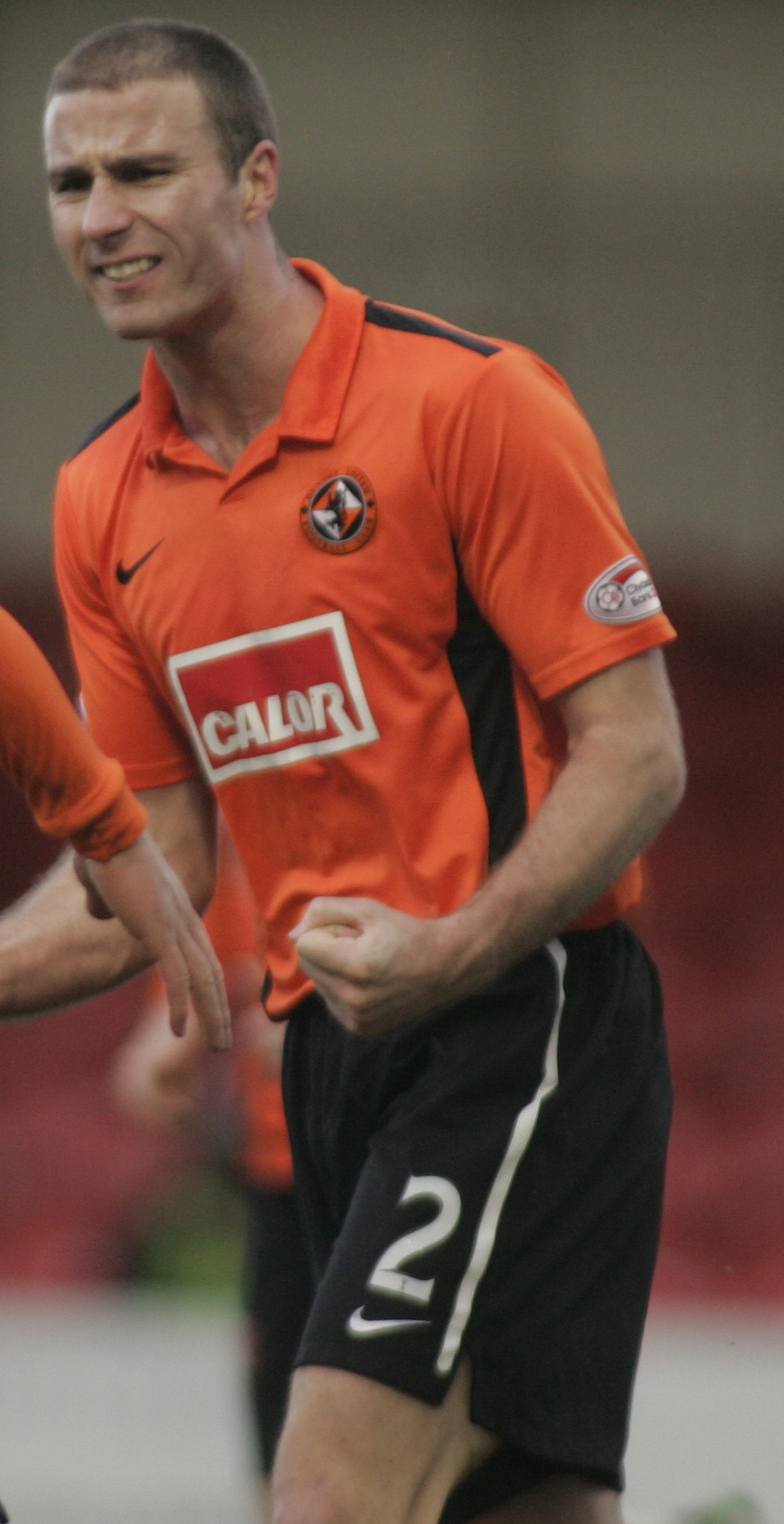
- Dillon playing for Dundee United in 2011

Personal information
- Date of birth: 30 July 1983 (age 43)
- Place of birth: Dublin, Ireland
- Position: Defender

Team information
- Current team: Montrose
- Number: 14

Youth career
- Cherry Orchard
- 1999–2002: Aston Villa

Senior career*
Years	Team	Apps	(Gls)
2002–2005	Longford Town	114	(5)
2006	Shelbourne	29	(0)
2007–2017	Dundee United	274	(7)
2017–	Montrose	260	(8)

International career
1999–2000	Republic of Ireland U16	2	(0)
2005	Republic of Ireland U21	1	(0)
2007	Republic of Ireland B	1	(0)
- * Club domestic league appearances and goals as of 4 May 2026

Seán Dillon (born 30 July 1983) is an Irish professional footballer who plays as a defender for Scottish League One club Montrose, where he also serves as a coach.

He previously played for Dundee United and Irish teams Longford Town and Shelbourne in the League of Ireland prior to joining Dundee United in January 2007 then Montrose in June 2017.

He has represented the Republic of Ireland at under-16, under-21 and B international level.

== Club career ==
Dillon was a youth player with Aston Villa but moved back to Ireland in 2002 with Longford Town, where he won two FAI Cups and a League of Ireland Cup during his four years at Flancare Park. In 2006, he moved to Shelbourne and helped them to their thirteenth league championship win, also scoring the only goal of the game in Shels' Intertoto Cup win in Lithuania over FK Vėtra. In January 2007, Dillon moved to Scottish side Dundee United for an undisclosed fee.

In March 2008 he collected a Scottish League Cup runners-up medal despite being an unused substitute in the final. However, on 15 May 2010, he was then a part of the Dundee United team who defeated Ross County 3–0 to lift the Scottish Cup at Hampden Park.

Not long after the beginning of the 2012–13 season Dillon signed a contract extension that would keep him at the club until May 2015. He was then appointed club captain by manager Jackie McNamara for the 2013–14 season.

On 30 June 2017, it was announced that Dillon had signed a two-year contract as a player-coach with Montrose. In the 2017–18 season Dillon didn't miss a game, as the gable endies clinched the Scottish League 2 title by one point. In 2019, Dillon signed a contract extension keeping him at Montrose until summer 2021, with manager Stewart Petrie crediting him with having a "huge influence on the teams success" since his arrival. In December 2022, Dillon agreed a one-year extension with Montrose which would keep him with the Gable Endies until 2024. In August 2026, Dillon became the oldest ever outfield player to make an appearance in the Scottish Professional Football League, aged 43.

== International career ==
Dillon represented the Republic of Ireland at the 2000 UEFA Under-21 Championship and is a former under-21 international who represented his country at the 2003 FIFA World Youth Championship, appearing as a substitute in the second round exit. Dillon also represented the Ireland under-21 team on one occasion and played alongside United teammate Noel Hunt for the Ireland B team in October 2007 in a match against Scotland who included teammate Darren Dods.

== Personal ==
His aunt, Noeleen McMahon, won four caps for the Republic of Ireland women's national football team.

== Career statistics ==
As of match played 3 September 2018

Appearances and goals by club, season and competition
Club	Season	League			Scottish Cup		League Cup		Other		Total	
Club	Season	Division	Apps	Goals	Apps	Goals	Apps	Goals	Apps	Goals	Apps	Goals
Dundee United	2006–07	Scottish Premier League	15	0	1	0	0	0	—		16	0
Dundee United	2007–08	Scottish Premier League	33	2	3	0	4	0	—		40	2
Dundee United	2008–09	Scottish Premier League	19	0	2	0	3	0	—		24	0
Dundee United	2009–10	Scottish Premier League	33	0	5	0	3	0	—		41	0
Dundee United	2010–11	Scottish Premier League	34	1	5	0	2	0	2 (Note: Appearances in the Europa League)	0	43	1
Dundee United	2011–12	Scottish Premier League	28	0	3	0	0	0	2	0	33	0
Dundee United	2012–13	Scottish Premier League	31	0	3	0	2	0	1	0	37	0
Dundee United	2013–14	Scottish Premiership	23	1	2	0	2	0	—		27	1
Dundee United	2014–15	Scottish Premiership	27	1	3	0	3	0	—		33	1
Dundee United	2015–16	Scottish Premiership	26	2	4	0	1	0	—		31	2
Dundee United	2016–17	Scottish Championship	10	0	0	0	3	0	8 (Note: Four appearances in the Scottish Challenge Cup and four in the Premiership play-offs)	0	21	0
Dundee United	Total		279	7	31	0	23	0	13	0	346	7
Montrose	2017–18	Scottish League Two	36	2	2	0	4	0	2 (Note: Appearances in the Scottish Challenge Cup)	0	44	2
Montrose	2018-19	Scottish League One	5	0	0	0	4	0	0	0	9	0
UK Career total			320	9	33	0	31	0	15	0	399	9

== Honours ==
Longford Town

- FAI Cup: 2003, 2004
- League of Ireland Cup: 2004

Shelbourne

- League of Ireland: 2006

Dundee United

- Scottish Cup: 2009–10
- Scottish League Challenge Cup: 2016–17

Montrose

- Scottish League Two: 2017–18
