= 2015–16 Dundee United F.C. season =

Dundee United
2015–16 season
- Chairman: Stephen Thompson
- Manager: Jackie McNamara (Until 26 September); Mixu Paatelainen (From 14 October to 4 May); Gordon Young (Caretaker)
- Stadium: Tannadice Park
- Premiership: 12th (relegated)
- Scottish Cup: Semi-final
- League Cup: Fourth round
- Top goalscorer: League: Billy McKay (12); All: Billy McKay (12)
- Highest home attendance: 11,835 vs Dundee, Premiership, 11 August 2015
- Lowest home attendance: 5,174 vs Dunfermline Athletic, League Cup, 22 September 2015
- Average home league attendance: 7,969
Home colours	Away colours

The 2015–16 season is Dundee United's 107th season, having been founded as Dundee Hibernian in 1909 and their third season in the Scottish Premiership. United will also compete in the League Cup and the Scottish Cup.

== Summary ==
=== Management ===
They began the season under the management of Jackie McNamara, who was on a long-term contract until 2017. On 26 September 2015, following the club's defeat to St Johnstone, McNamara was relieved of his duties as manager of the club, however he still remained an employee of Dundee United. The following day McNamara and his backroom staff Simon Donnelly, Darren Jackson and Craig Hinchcliffe officially left the club. Assistant youth coach Dave Bowman became caretaker manager.

On 14 October, United appointed former player Mixu Paatelainen as head coach. His first game in charge was versus Heart of Midlothian on 18 October. Paatelainen left his position as manager after United's relegation to the championship was confirmed in May 2016 with coach Gordon Young placed in charge for the remaining three games of the season.

== Results & fixtures ==
Win Draw Loss Postponed

=== Pre season / Friendlies ===
7 July 2015 Forfarshire Cup	Arbroath	2–0	Dundee United	Arbroath
19:45 BST	Jamie Reid 41'; Kane Hester 84'			Stadium: Gayfield Park

10 July 2015 Friendly	(Netherlands) Vitesse	4–0	Dundee United	Arnhem
19:30 BST	Djurdjevic 14', 17'; Oliynyk 54'; Kazaishvili 68'	Dundee United Report		Stadium: GelreDome; Attendance: 1,824

14 July 2015 Friendly	(Netherlands) AZ Alkmaar	3–1	Dundee United	Alkmaar
19:00 BST	Markus Henriksen 21'; Derrick Luckassen 57'; Jeffrey Gouweleeuw 79'	Dundee United Report	Spittal 28'	Stadium: AFAS Stadion; Attendance: 1,000

16 July 2015 Friendly	(Netherlands) FC Utrecht	4–0	Dundee United	Utrecht
19:00 BST	Nacer Barazite 29'; Yannick Cortie 39'; Yassin Ayoub 61'; Yannick Cortie 90+2'	Dundee United Report		Stadium: Stadion Galgenwaard

22 July 2015 Friendly	(England) Queens Park Rangers	2–1	Dundee United	London
19:30 BST	Phillips 19'; Luongo 65'	Dundee United Report	Bilate 23'	Stadium: The Hive Stadium

25 July 2015 Friendly	Dundee United	0–1	(England) Watford	Dundee
15:00 BST		Dundee United Report	Deeney 53'	Stadium: Tannadice Park

=== Scottish Premiership ===
2 August 2015 Scottish Premiership	Dundee United	0–1	Aberdeen	Tannadice Park
15:30		BBC Report	McLean 82'	Attendance: 10,706; Referee: Clancy

8 August 2015 Scottish Premiership	Motherwell	0–2	Dundee United	Fir Park
15:00		BBC Report	Laing 83' (o.g.); Murray 90'	Attendance: 4,859; Referee: Madden

11 August 2015 Scottish Premiership	Dundee United	2–2	Dundee	Tannadice Park
19:45	Spittal 64', 67'	BBC Report	Stewart 81'; McPake 90+4'	Attendance: 11,835; Referee: Beaton

15 August 2015 Scottish Premiership	Hamilton Academical	4–0	Dundee United	New Douglas Park
15:00	Crawford 19'; Lucas 36'; Morris 39'; Nadé 90+2'	BBC Report		Attendance: 2,173; Referee: McLean

22 August 2015 Scottish Premiership	Dundee United	1–3	Celtic	Tannadice Park
15:00	Erskine 45' (pen.)	BBC Report	Griffiths 17'; Durnan 44' (o.g.); McGregor 74'	Attendance: 10,605; Referee: Collum

29 August 2015 Scottish Premiership	Ross County	2–1	Dundee United	Victoria Park
15:00	Boyce 17' (pen.); Davies 28'	BBC Report	Dillon 61'	Attendance: 4,014; Referee: Thomson

12 September 2015 Scottish Premiership	Dundee United	1–2	Kilmarnock	Tannadice Park
15:00	McKay 66' (pen.)	BBC Report	Higginbotham 44' (pen.); McHattie 88'	Attendance: 8,264; Referee: Colvin

19 September 2015 Scottish Premiership	Dundee United	1–1	Inverness Caledonian Thistle	Tannadice Park
15:00	McKay 7'	BBC Report	Meekings 56'	Attendance: 6,235; Referee: Clancy

26 September 2015 Scottish Premiership	St Johnstone	2–1	Dundee United	McDiarmid Park
15:00	Mannus (red card) 23'; Cummins 63'; Lappin 80'	BBC Report	McKay 24' (pen.)	Attendance: 4,634; Referee: Madden

3 October 2015 Scottish Premiership	Partick Thistle	3–0	Dundee United	Firhill Stadium
15:00	Amoo 15'; Dumbuya 55'; Bannigan 65'	BBC Report		Attendance: 3,675; Referee: Thomson

18 October 2015 Scottish Premiership	Dundee United	0–1	Heart of Midlothian	Tannadice Park
12:15	Spittal (yellow card) 90+3' (yellow-red card)	BBC Report	Juanma 16' (pen.)	Attendance: 7,461; Referee: Clancy

25 October 2015 Scottish Premiership	Celtic	5–0	Dundee United	Celtic Park
15:00	Griffiths 23'; Boyata 40'; Commons 45+1' (pen.), 53'; Kuhl 89' (o.g.)	BBC Report		Referee: Craig Thomson

31 October 2015 Scottish Premiership	Dundee United	1–0	Ross County	Tannadice Park
15:00	McKay 81' (pen.)	BBC Report		Attendance: 5,549; Referee: Robertson

7 November 2015 Scottish Premiership	Aberdeen	2–0	Dundee United	Pittodrie Stadium
15:00	Rooney 52'; Hayes 73'	BBC Report		Attendance: 12,805; Referee: McLean

21 November 2015 Scottish Premiership	Dundee United	1–2	St Johnstone	Tannadice Park
15:00	McKay 33'	BBC Report	Kane 43'; Davidson 45+1'	Attendance: 7,020; Referee: Thomson

28 November 2015 Scottish Premiership	Dundee United	1–2	Hamilton Academical	Tannadice Park
15:00	McKay 29'	BBC Report	Tagliapietra 43'; Gordon 79'	Attendance: 5,788; Referee: Finnie

5 December 2015 Scottish Premiership	Kilmarnock	1–1	Dundee United	Rugby Park
15:00	Boyd 4'; Findlay (red card) 23'	BBC Report	McKay 24' (pen.)	Attendance: 2,828; Referee: Beaton

12 December 2015 Scottish Premiership	Dundee United	0–1	Partick Thistle	Tannadice Park
15:00		BBC Report	Doolan 51'	Attendance: 6,256; Referee: McLean

19 December 2015 Scottish Premiership	Inverness Caledonian Thistle	2–2	Dundee United	Caledonian Stadium
15:00	Polworth 46'; Horner 90+2'	BBC Report	Rankin 26'; McKay 81'	Attendance: 2,981; Referee: Thomson

26 December 2015 Scottish Premiership	Dundee United	P – P	Motherwell	Tannadice Park
15:00		BBC Report		Referee: Dallas
Note: Postponed due to a waterlogged pitch.

30 December 2015 Scottish Premiership	Heart of Midlothian	3–2	Dundee United	Tynecastle Stadium
19:45	Reilly 17'; Buaben 26'; Sow 30' (pen.)	BBC Report	Mckay 2' (pen.); Fraser 45'	Attendance: 16,721; Referee: Madden

2 January 2016 Scottish Premiership	Dundee	2–1	Dundee United	Dens Park
	Hemmings 41'; Ross 62'	BBC Report	Spittal 15'; Demel (yellow card) 82' (yellow-red card)	Attendance: 11,025; Referee: Clancy

15 January 2016 Scottish Premiership	Dundee United	1–4	Celtic	Tannadice Park
	Murray 31'	BBC Report	Griffiths 21', 48'; Šimunović 27'; Commons 56'	Attendance: 10,848; Referee: Madden

23 January 2016 Scottish Premiership	Dundee United	5–1	Kilmarnock	Tannadice Park
	Spittal 8', 39'; Durnan 32'; Rankin 44'; Dillon 78'	BBC Report	Magennis 82'	Attendance: 7,729; Referee: Anderson

30 January 2016 Scottish Premiership	Partick Thistle	P – P	Dundee United	Firhill Stadium
		BBC Report		Referee: Dallas
Note: Postponed due to a waterlogged pitch.

13 February 2016 Scottish Premiership	Hamilton Academical	0–0	Dundee United	New Douglas Park
		BBC Report		Attendance: 3,902; Referee: McLean

16 February 2016 Scottish Premiership	Dundee United	0–3	Motherwell	Tannadice Park
		BBC Report	McManus 45+1'; McDonald 72', 80'	Attendance: 6,251; Referee: Aitken

20 February 2016 Scottish Premiership	Dundee United	2–1	Heart of Midlothian	Tannadice Park
	Demel 43'; Paton 88'; Anier (yellow card) 90' (yellow-red card)	BBC Report	Walker 48'; McGhee (yellow card) 40' (yellow-red card)	Attendance: 8,031; Referee: Clancy

27 February 2016 Scottish Premiership	Ross County	0–3	Dundee United	Victoria Park
		BBC Report	Paton 10'; Mckay 71'; Dow 76'	Attendance: 3,564; Referee: Beaton

2 March 2016 Scottish Premiership	Dundee United	0–1	Aberdeen	Tannadice Park
	Paton (yellow card) 90+2'	Report	Church 29'; Shinnie (yellow card) 36'	Attendance: 9,737; Referee: (Scotland) Bobby Madden

11 March 2016 Scottish Premiership	Motherwell	2–1	Dundee United	Fir Park
	Johnson 45+1'; Lasley (yellow card) 54'; Moult 65'	Report	Anier 22'; Donaldson (yellow card) 42'; Dixon (yellow card) 72'; Morris (yellow card) 74'; Paton (yellow card) 90+3'	Attendance: 4,210; Referee: (Scotland) Crawford Allan

20 March 2016 Scottish Premiership	Dundee United	2–2	Dundee	Tannadice Park
	Dixon (yellow card) 44'; Mckay 53' (pen.) 90+1'; Ofere (yellow card) 87'	Report	Hemmings 34' 45'; Bain (red card) 51'; Holt (yellow card) 90+5'	Attendance: 11,603; Referee: (Scotland) Steven McLean (referee)

2 April 2016 Scottish Premiership	St Johnstone	0–1	Dundee United	McDiarmid Park
		Report	Dow 22'; Morris (yellow card) 25'; Donaldson (red card) 60'	Attendance: 5,784; Referee: (Scotland) Willie Collum

5 April 2016 Scottish Premiership	Partick Thistle	1–0	Dundee United	Firhill Stadium
	Frans (yellow card) 3'; Doolan 71'; Booth (yellow card) 85'; Danny Seaborne (yellow card) 90'	Report	Fraser (yellow card) 90'	Attendance: 4,533; Referee: (Scotland) Hugh Dallas

9 April 2016 Scottish Premiership	Dundee United	0–2	Inverness Caledonian Thistle	Tannadice Park
	Murray (yellow card) 85'; Rankin (yellow card) 90'	Report	Storey 13'; Vigurs 50'; Mbuyi-Mutombo (yellow card) 52'; Tansey (yellow card) 57'; Tremarco (yellow card) 62'; Fôn Williams (yellow card) 90'	Attendance: 6,927; Referee: (Scotland) Craig Thomson (referee)

24 April 2016 Scottish Premiership	Dundee United	1–3	Hamilton Academical	Tannadice Park
	Dow (yellow card) 44'; Durnan (yellow card) 47'; Murray 89'	Report	Gillespie 12'; Morris (yellow card) 24' (goal) 52' 73'; Crawford (yellow card) 50'; Imrie (yellow card) 76'	Attendance: 5,884; Referee: (Scotland) Steven McLean (referee)

2 May 2016 Scottish Premiership	Dundee	2–1	Dundee United	Dens Park
	Gadzhalov 77'; Bain (yellow card) 80'; Stewart (yellow card) 84'; O'Dea (yellow card) 86'; Wighton 90'	Report	Dixon (yellow card) 4'; Ofere 54'; Kawashima (yellow card) 84'; Paton (yellow card) 86'; Dillon (yellow card) 90'	Attendance: 10,088; Referee: (Scotland) Willie Collum

6 May 2016 Scottish Premiership	Inverness Caledonian Thistle	2–3	Dundee United	Caledonian Stadium
	=Roberts 57'; Polworth 70'; Storey (yellow card) 73'	Report	Murray 6' 45'; Ofere 55'; Morris (yellow card) 76' (yellow-red card)	Attendance: 3,587; Referee: (Scotland) Don Robertson

10 May 2016 Scottish Premiership	Dundee United	3–3	Partick Thistle	Tannadice Park
	Fraser (yellow card) 60'; Lindsay 67' (o.g.); Ofere (yellow card) 76' (goal) 87'; Johnson 90+1'	Report	Frans 6'; Doolan 34'; Edwards 76'; Penrice (yellow card) 78'	Attendance: 4,689; Referee: (Scotland) Craig Thomson (referee)

14 May 2016 Scottish Premiership	Kilmarnock	2–4	Dundee United	Rugby Park
	Balatoni (yellow card) 23'; Higginbotham 27'; Obadeyi 34'; Hodson (yellow card) 63'	Report	Durnan 12' (yellow card) 30'; Murray 74' 82'; Souttar 86'	Attendance: 2,702; Referee: (Scotland) Bobby Madden

=== Scottish League Cup ===
22 September 2015 League Cup round 3	Dundee United	3–1 (a.e.t.)	Dunfermline Athletic	Tannadice Park
19:45	Morris 35'; Fraser 96'; Spittal 99'	BBC Report	Paton 10'	Attendance: 5,174; Referee: Beaton

4 November 2015 League Cup round 4	Hibernian	3–0	Dundee United	Easter Road
19:45	Gray 20'; Cummings 61' (pen.); Stevenson 90+4'	BBC Report		Attendance: 11,891; Referee: Collum

=== Scottish Cup ===
9 January 2016 Scottish Cup round 4	Airdrieonians	0–1	Dundee United	Excelsior Stadium
15:00		BBC Report	Spittal 79'	Attendance: 2,330; Referee: Aitken

6 February 2016 Scottish Cup round 5	Dundee United	1–0	Partick Thistle	Tannadice Park
15:00	Fraser 85'	BBC Report		Attendance: 5,803; Referee: Collum

5 March 2016 Scottish Cup Quarter Final	Ross County	2–3	Dundee United	Victoria Park
15:00	Boyce 24'; Graham 60' (pen.)	BBC Report	Anier 57', 65'; Mckay 89'; Durnan (red card) 59'	Attendance: 3,052; Referee: Thomson

16 April 2016 Scottish Cup Semi Final	Hibernian	0–0 (a.e.t.) (4-2 p)	Dundee United	Hampden Park
12:15		Report	Donaldson (yellow card) 30'; Dow (yellow card) 90'	Attendance: 19,651; Referee: (Scotland) John Beaton

== Squad statistics ==
During the 2015–16 season, Dundee United have used thirty-four different players in competitive games.

As of 14 May 2016 (UTC)

No.	Pos	Nat	Player	Total		Premiership		League Cup		Scottish Cup	
No.	Pos	Nat	Player	Apps	Goals	Apps	Goals	Apps	Goals	Apps	Goals
1	GK	(Japan) JPN	Eiji Kawashima	19	0	16+0	0	0+0	0	3+0	0
2	DF	(Republic of Ireland) IRL	Seán Dillon	31	2	22+4	2	1+0	0	4+0	0
3	DF	(Scotland) SCO	Paul Dixon	29	0	27+1	0	0+0	0	1+0	0
5	DF	(Republic of Ireland) IRL	Callum Morris	15	1	13+0	0	1+0	1	1+0	0
6	DF	(Northern Ireland) NIR	Paul Paton	18	2	13+1	2	0+0	0	3+1	0
7	FW	(Northern Ireland) NIR	Billy Mckay	36	12	28+1	12	2+0	0	4+1	0
8	MF	(Scotland) SCO	John Rankin	41	2	34+1	2	2+0	0	4+0	0
9	FW	(Nigeria) NGA	Edward Ofere	13	3	6+7	3	0+0	0	0+0	0
11	MF	(Scotland) SCO	Chris Erskine	18	1	8+7	1	0+0	0	2+1	0
12	DF	(England) ENG	Kyle Knoyle	11	0	8+1	0	0+0	0	1+1	0
14	FW	(Scotland) SCO	Ryan Dow	21	2	12+6	2	0+0	0	3+0	0
15	MF	(Scotland) SCO	Simon Murray	25	7	9+13	7	0+2	0	1+0	0
16	MF	(Scotland) SCO	Charlie Telfer	8	0	5+2	0	1+0	0	0+0	0
17	DF	(Scotland) SCO	Mark Durnan	33	1	26+2	1	2+0	0	2+1	0
18	FW	(Scotland) SCO	Aidan Connolly	11	0	1+10	0	0+0	0	0+0	0
19	DF	(Republic of Ireland) IRL	Gavin Gunning	20	0	19+0	0	0+0	0	1+0	0
20	MF	(Scotland) SCO	Blair Spittal	39	7	27+6	5	1+1	1	4+0	1
21	GK	(Poland) POL	Michał Szromnik	10	0	9+0	0	1+0	0	0+0	0
22	MF	(Scotland) SCO	Scott Fraser	36	3	23+9	1	2+0	1	1+1	1
24	DF	(Scotland) SCO	Euan Spark	1	0	1+0	0	0+0	0	0+0	0
25	FW	(Finland) FIN	Riku Riski	4	0	1+2	0	0+0	0	0+1	0
28	DF	(Scotland) SCO	Coll Donaldson	22	0	15+3	0	0+0	0	4+0	0
30	FW	(Austria) AUT	Darko Bodul	12	0	7+4	0	1+0	0	0+0	0
32	GK	(Scotland) SCO	Scott Lochhead	0	0	0+0	0	0+0	0	0+0	0
33	FW	(Netherlands) NED	Justin Johnson	3	1	1+2	1	0+0	0	0+0	0
35	MF	(Scotland) SCO	Bradley Smith	2	0	0+2	0	0+0	0	0+0	0
36	DF	(Scotland) SCO	Cammy Ballantyne	2	0	0+2	0	0+0	0	0+0	0
38	DF	(Australia) AUS	Harry Souttar	2	1	1+1	1	0+0	0	0+0	0
40	MF	(Scotland) SCO	Jamie Robson	1	0	0+0	0	1+0	0	0+0	0
43	MF	(Scotland) SCO	Matty Smith	2	0	2+0	0	0+0	0	0+0	0
51	GK	(Germany) GER	Luis Zwick	15	0	13+0	0	1+0	0	1+0	0
54	FW	(France) FRA	Florent Sinama Pongolle	4	0	4+0	0	0+0	0	0+0	0
55	DF	(Ivory Coast) CIV	Guy Demel	15	1	12+0	1	0+0	0	2+1	0
Players who left the club during the 2015–16 season
4	DF	(Scotland) SCO	John Souttar	20	0	17+3	0	0+0	0	0+0	0
7	MF	(Netherlands) NED	Rodney Sneijder	1	0	0+1	0	0+0	0	0+0	0
10	FW	(Scotland) SCO	Robbie Muirhead	3	0	1+2	0	0+0	0	0+0	0
12	DF	(Australia) AUS	Ryan McGowan	24	0	22+0	0	2+0	0	0+0	0
19	FW	(Netherlands) NED	Mario Bilate	2	0	1+1	0	0+0	0	0+0	0
25	MF	(England) ENG	Aaron Kuhl	7	0	5+0	0	2+0	0	0+0	0
29	FW	(Australia) AUS	Adam Taggart	9	0	4+3	0	1+1	0	0+0	0

=== Disciplinary record ===
As of 14 May 2016 (UTC)

Position	Nation	Number	Name	Premiership		League Cup		Scottish Cup		Total	
Position	Nation	Number	Name	Booked	Sent off (straight red)	Booked	Sent off (straight red)	Booked	Sent off (straight red)	Booked	Sent off (straight red)
1	(Japan)	GK	Eiji Kawashima	1	0	0	0	0	0	1	0
2	(Republic of Ireland)	DF	Seán Dillon	2	0	0	0	0	0	2	0
3	(Scotland)	DF	Paul Dixon	8	0	0	0	0	0	8	0
4	(Scotland)	DF	John Souttar	1	0	0	0	0	0	1	0
5	(Republic of Ireland)	DF	Callum Morris	3	1	1	0	0	0	4	1
6	(Scotland)	DF	Paul Paton	4	0	0	0	1	0	5	0
7	(Northern Ireland)	FW	Billy McKay	1	0	0	0	0	0	1	0
8	(Scotland)	MF	John Rankin	5	0	0	0	1	0	6	0
9	(Nigeria)	FW	Edward Ofere	1	0	0	0	0	0	1	0
12	(Australia)	DF	Ryan McGowan	5	0	0	0	0	0	5	0
14	(Scotland)	DF	Ryan Dow	3	0	0	0	1	0	4	0
15	(Scotland)	MF	Simon Murray	2	0	0	0	0	0	2	0
16	(Scotland)	MF	Charlie Telfer	0	0	1	0	0	0	1	0
17	(Scotland)	DF	Mark Durnan	9	1	2	0	0	1	11	2
18	(Scotland)	FW	Aidan Connolly	2	1	0	0	0	0	2	1
19	(Republic of Ireland)	DF	Gavin Gunning	4	0	0	0	0	0	4	0
20	(Scotland)	MF	Blair Spittal	2	1	0	0	0	0	2	1
21	(Poland)	GK	Michał Szromnik	1	0	0	0	0	0	1	0
22	(Scotland)	MF	Scott Fraser	6	0	0	0	0	0	6	0
26	(Estonia)	FW	Henri Anier	3	1	0	0	1	0	4	1
28	(Scotland)	DF	Coll Donaldson	4	1	0	0	1	0	5	1
30	(Austria)	FW	Darko Bodul	1	0	0	0	0	0	1	0
55	(Ivory Coast)	DF	Guy Demel	3	1	0	0	0	0	3	1
Total				67	7	4	0	6	1	82	8

== Team statistics ==
=== League table ===
Pos	Team	Pld	W	D	L	GF	GA	GD	Pts	Qualification or relegation (Note: Teams play each other three times (33 matches), before the league is split into two groups (the top six and the bottom six).)
8	Dundee	38	11	15	12	53	57	−4	48	
9	Partick Thistle	38	12	10	16	41	50	−9	46	
10	Hamilton Academical	38	11	10	17	42	63	−21	43	
11	Kilmarnock (O)	38	9	9	20	41	64	−23	36	Qualification for the Premiership play-off final
12	Dundee United (Note: Dundee United were deducted three points for fielding an ineligible player in their win over Inverness Caledonian Thistle on 6 May 2016.) (R)	38	8	7	23	45	70	−25	28	Relegation to the Scottish Championship

Source: Scottish Premiership, Soccerway (first phase), Soccerway (second phase)
Rules for classification: 1) Points; 2) Goal difference; 3) Goals scored; 4) Play-off (only if deciding champion, UEFA competitions qualification and second stage group allocation).
(O) Play-off winners; (R) Relegated

=== Management statistics ===
Last updated on 14 May 2016

Name	From	To	P	W	D	L	Win% (Note: Win% is the percentage of matches won rounded to two decimal places.)
Jackie McNamara	2 August 2015	28 September 2015	10	2	2	6	20.00
Dave Bowman	28 September 2015	14 October 2015	1	0	0	1	0.00
Mixu Paatelainen	14 October 2015	4 May 2016	25	5	4	16	20.00

=== Division summary ===
Round	1	2	3	4	5	6	7	8	9	10	11	12	13	14	15	16	17	18	19	20	21	22	23	24	25	26	27	28	29	30	31	32	33	34	35	36	37	38
Ground	H	A	H	A	H	A	H	H	A	A	H	A	H	A	H	H	A	H	A	A	A	H	H	A	H	H	A	H	A	H	A	A	H	H	A	A	H	A
Result	L	W	D	L	L	L	L	D	L	L	L	L	W	L	L	L	D	L	D	L	L	L	W	D	L	W	W	L	L	D	W	L	L	L	L	W	D	W
Position	9	5	5	7	9	9	11	11	11	12	12	12	12	12	12	12	12	12	12	12	12	12	12	12	12	12	12	12	12	12	12	12	12	12	12	12	12	12

Updated to match(es) played on 14 May 2016. Source:
A = Away; H = Home; W = Win; D = Draw; L = Loss

== Transfers ==
=== In ===
Date	Player	From	Fee
1 July 2015	(Scotland) Mark Durnan	(Scotland) Queen of the South	Undisclosed
13 July 2015	(Scotland) Coll Donaldson	(England) Queens Park Rangers	Free
20 July 2015	(Austria) Darko Bodul	(Austria) Rheindorf Altach	Free
24 July 2015	(Netherlands) Rodney Sneijder	(Netherlands) Almere City	Free
28 August 2015	(Northern Ireland) Billy Mckay	(England) Wigan Athletic	Loan
1 September 2015	(Australia) Adam Taggart	(England) Fulham	Loan
1 September 2015	(England) Aaron Kuhl	(England) Reading	Loan
20 November 2015	(Republic of Ireland) Gavin Gunning	(England) Oldham Athletic	Free
23 November 2015	(Ivory Coast) Guy Demel	(England) West Ham United	Free
27 November 2015	(France) Florent Sinama Pongolle	(Switzerland) Lausanne-Sport	Free
29 December 2015	(Japan) Eiji Kawashima	(Belgium) Standard Liège	Free
8 January 2016	(Finland) Riku Riski	(Norway) Rosenborg	Loan
6 February 2016	(Nigeria) Edward Ofere	(Turkey) Boluspor	Free

=== Out ===
Player	To	Fee
(Scotland) Darren Petrie	(Scotland) Raith Rovers	Free
(Scotland) Michael Gardyne	(Scotland) Ross County	Free
(Poland) Jarosław Fojut	(Poland) Pogoń Szczecin	Free
(Poland) Radosław Cierzniak	(Poland) Wisła Kraków	Free
(Scotland) Keith Watson	(Scotland) St Mirren	Free
(England) Calum Butcher	(England) Burton Albion	Free
(England) Kudus Oyenuga	(England) Hartlepool United	Free
(Scotland) Brian Graham	(Scotland) Ross County	Free
(Scotland) Jamie Montgomery	(Scotland) Brechin City	Free
(Turkey) Nadir Çiftçi	(Scotland) Celtic	£1.5 million
(Netherlands) Rodney Sneijder	Unattached	Free
(Estonia) Henri Anier	(Scotland) Hibernian	Loan
(Scotland) Scott Smith	(Scotland) Airdrieonians	Loan
(Scotland) Robbie Muirhead	(Scotland) Partick Thistle	Loan
(Scotland) Marc McCallum	(Scotland) Livingston	Loan
(Northern Ireland) Joe McGovern	(Scotland) East Fife	Loan
(Netherlands) Mario Bilate	Unattached	Free
(Scotland) Marc McCallum	(Scotland) Livingston	Free
(Scotland) Aidan Connolly	(Scotland) Raith Rovers	Free
(Scotland) Euan Spark	(Scotland) Forfar Athletic	Loan
(Scotland) Scott Smith	(Scotland) Forfar Athletic	Free
(Scotland) John Souttar	(Scotland) Heart of Midlothian	Undisclosed
(Scotland) Robbie Muirhead	Unattached	Free

== See also ==
- List of Dundee United F.C. seasons
