= 2014–15 Dundee United F.C. season =

Dundee United
2014–15 season
- Chairman: Stephen Thompson
- Manager: Jackie McNamara
- Stadium: Tannadice Park
- Premiership: Fifth place
- League Cup: Runners-up
- Scottish Cup: Quarter-final
- Top goalscorer: League: Nadir Çiftçi (14); All: Nadir Çiftçi (16)
- Highest home attendance: 13,041 vs. Dundee; League Cup; 24 September 2014
- Lowest home attendance: 5,243 vs. Hamilton; Premiership; 11 April 2014
- Average home league attendance: 7,878
Home colours	Away colours

The 2014–15 season is the club's 106th season, having been founded as Dundee Hibernian in 1909 and their second season in the Scottish Premiership. United will also compete in the League Cup and the Scottish Cup.

== Results & fixtures ==
Win Draw Loss Postponed

=== Preseason ===
8 July 2014 Friendly	(Republic of Ireland) Athlone Town	0–0	Dundee United	Athlone Town Stadium
19:45		Report		Referee: McLoughlin

12 July 2014 Friendly	(Republic of Ireland) Bohemian	0–4	Dundee United	Dalymount Park
15:00		Report	Dow 39'; Çiftçi 40' (pen.); Armstrong 64'; Graham 90' (pen.)	Referee: Harvey

16 July 2014 Friendly	Forfar Athletic	2–2	Dundee United	Station Park
19:30	Hilson 51' (pen.), 54'	Report	Robertson 29'; Moore 88'	Attendance: 1,745; Referee: Shaw

18 July 2014 Friendly	(Netherlands) FC Winterswijk	0–6	Dundee United	Jasperweg
18:30		Report	Connolly 6', 47'; Graham 36'; Armstrong 69'; Çiftçi 85'; Redeker 89' (o.g.)	Attendance: 500; Referee: Rutgers

20 July 2014 Friendly	(Netherlands) FC Utrecht	2–1	Dundee United	Stadion Galgenwaard
16:00	Toornstra 48' de Kogel 52'	Report	Graham 85'	Attendance: 6,553; Referee: Nijhuis

22 July 2014 Friendly	(Netherlands) NAC Breda	1–2	Dundee United	Sportpark De Gagelrijzen
18:00	Tighadouini 10'	Report	Graham 78'; Bilate 83'	Attendance: 1,211; Referee: Janssen

27 July 2014 Friendly	Hibernian	0–1	Dundee United	Easter Road
14:00		Report	Erskine 77'	Attendance: 6,264; Referee: Collum

2 August 2014 Friendly	(England) Leeds United	2–0	Dundee United	Elland Road
15:00	Morison 3'; Poleon 86'	Report		Attendance: 10,115; Referee: Madeley

=== Scottish Premiership ===
10 August 2014 Scottish Premiership	Aberdeen	0–3	Dundee United	Pittodrie Stadium
15:00		BBC Report	Dow 29'; Mackay-Steven 45'; Erskine 90'	Attendance: 16,471; Referee: Collum

13 August 2014 Scottish Premiership	Dundee United	1–0	Motherwell	Tannadice Park
19:45	Bilate 83'	BBC Report		Attendance: 8,367; Referee: Clancy

16 August 2014 Scottish Premiership	Celtic	6–1	Dundee United	Celtic Park
12:45	Denayer 4'; Commons 27'; Johansen 34'; Stokes 54'; Berget 62', 90+1'	BBC Report	Rankin 71'	Attendance: 44,484; Referee: Thomson

23 August 2014 Scottish Premiership	Dundee United	2–1	Ross County	Tannadice Park
15:00	Çiftçi 19'; Erskine 86'	BBC Report	Jervis 51'	Attendance: 7,179; Referee: McLean

30 August 2014 Scottish Premiership	St Mirren	0–3	Dundee United	St Mirren Park
15:00		BBC Report	Erskine 47'; Fojut 69'; Spittal 86'	Attendance: 4,245; Referee: Madden

13 September 2014 Scottish Premiership	Dundee United	2–2	Hamilton Academical	Tannadice Park
15:00	Çiftçi 17'; Fojut 45'	BBC Report	Antoine-Curier 28'; Andreu 34'	Attendance: 7,109; Referee: Beaton

21 September 2014 Scottish Premiership	Dundee	1–4	Dundee United	Dens Park
12:15	Stewart 90'	BBC Report	Bilate 25' (pen.); Dow 54'; Morris 59'; Watson 79'	Attendance: 11,447; Referee: McLean

27 September 2014 Scottish Premiership	Dundee United	2–0	St Johnstone	Tannadice Park
15:00	Erskine 23'; Paton 72'	BBC Report		Attendance: 7,161; Referee: Madden

3 October 2014 Scottish Premiership	Kilmarnock	2–0	Dundee United	Rugby Park
19:45	Obadeyi 63'; Connolly 65'	BBC Report		Attendance: 3,953; Referee: Allan

18 October 2014 Scottish Premiership	Dundee United	1–0	Partick Thistle	Tannadice Park
15:00	Çiftçi 84' (pen.)	BBC Report		Attendance: 6,756; Referee: McLean

25 October 2014 Scottish Premiership	Inverness Caledonian Thistle	1–0	Dundee United	Tulloch Caledonian Stadium
15:00	Watkins 10'	BBC Report		Attendance: 3,508; Referee: Clancy

1 November 2014 Scottish Premiership	Dundee United	3–0	St Mirren	Tannadice Park
15:00	Paton 45'; Çiftçi 56'; Telfer 73'	BBC Report		Attendance: 6,808; Referee: Dallas

7 November 2014 Scottish Premiership	Motherwell	1–0	Dundee United	Fir Park
19:45	Vigurs 52'	BBC Report		Attendance: 3,961; Referee: McLean

22 November 2014 Scottish Premiership	Dundee United	3–1	Kilmarnock	Tannadice Park
15:00	Çiftçi 5'; Armstrong 42'; Connolly 90'	BBC Report	Pascali 38'	Attendance: 6,664; Referee: Beaton

5 December 2014 Scottish Premiership	Ross County	2–3	Dundee United	Victoria Park
19:45	Arquin 76'; Maatsen 89'	BBC Report	Çiftçi 21', 58'; Armstrong 49'	Attendance: 2,922; Referee: Madden

13 December 2014 Scottish Premiership	Dundee United	0–2	Aberdeen	Tannadice Park
15:00		BBC Report	Rooney 19', 33'	Attendance: 11,196; Referee: Allan

21 December 2014 Scottish Premiership	Dundee United	2–1	Celtic	Tannadice Park
12:15	Çiftçi 5'; Armstrong 65'	BBC Report	Griffiths 87'	Attendance: 12,098; Referee: McLean

27 December 2014 Scottish Premiership	St Johnstone	2–1	Dundee United	McDiarmid Park
15:00	O'Halloran 76'; Millar 86'	BBC Report	Butcher 43'	Attendance: 7,384; Referee: Muir

1 January 2015 Scottish Premiership	Dundee United	6–2	Dundee	Tannadice Park
12:15	Armstrong 1'; Mackay-Steven 27', 42'; Erskine 31'; Fojut 64'; Telfer 83'	BBC Report	Stewart 24'; Tankulić 90'	Attendance: 12,964; Referee: Clancy

4 January 2015 Scottish Premiership	Partick Thistle	2–2	Dundee United	Firhill Stadium
15:00	Stevenson 24'; Doolan 32'	BBC Report	Mackay-Steven 10'; Çiftçi 73'	Attendance: 3,761; Referee: Beaton

12 January 2015 Scottish Premiership	Hamilton Academical	2–3	Dundee United	New Douglas Park
19:45	Tena 57'; Crawford 70'	BBC Report	Armstrong 38'; Mackay-Steven 46'; Dillon 77'	Attendance: 2,384; Referee: Madden

17 January 2015 Scottish Premiership	Dundee United	P–P	Inverness Caledonian Thistle	Tannadice Park
15:00		BBC Report

21 January 2015 Scottish Premiership	St Mirren	1–1	Dundee United	St Mirren Park
19:45	McLean 39'	BBC Report	Armstrong 43'	Attendance: 2,511; Referee: Beaton

24 January 2015 Scottish Premiership	Dundee United	3–1	Motherwell	Tannadice Park
15:00	Telfer 61', 90'; Fojut 69'	BBC Report	Ramsden 78'	Attendance: 7,176; Referee: Thomson

14 February 2015 Scottish Premiership	Kilmarnock	3–2	Dundee United	Rugby Park
15:00	Magennis 10'; Johnstone 52'; Clingan 90'	BBC report	Çiftçi 3' (pen.); Anier 13'	Attendance: 3,788; Referee: Finnie

21 February 2015 Scottish Premiership	Dundee United	0–2	St Johnstone	Tannadice Park
15:00		BBC Report	O'Halloran 9', 44'	Attendance: 7,623; Referee: Collum

24 February 2015 Scottish Premiership	Dundee United	1–1	Inverness Caledonian Thistle	Tannadice Park
19:45	McGowan 74'	BBC Report	Tansey 9' (pen.)	Attendance: 7,276; Referee: Murray

28 February 2015 Scottish Premiership	Dundee United	0–2	Partick Thistle	Tannadice Park
15:00		BBC Report	O'Donnell 34'; McGowan 41' (o.g.)	Attendance: 6,517; Referee: Aitken

21 March 2015 Scottish Premiership	Celtic	3–0	Dundee United	Celtic Park
15:00	Mackay-Steven 16'; Guidetti 33'; Denayer 45'	BBC Report		Attendance: 45,884; Referee: Clancy

4 April 2015 Scottish Premiership	Dundee United	1–2	Ross County	Tannadice Park
15:00	Çiftçi 20' (pen.)	BBC Report	Irvine 12'; Raffaele De Vita 72'	Attendance: 6,187; Referee: McLean

8 April 2015 Scottish Premiership	Dundee	3–1	Dundee United	Dens Park
19:45	Stewart 14'; McPake 23'; Heffernan 68'	BBC Report	Çiftçi 16' (pen.)	Attendance: 10,510; Referee: Beaton

11 April 2015 Scottish Premiership	Dundee United	1–0	Hamilton Academical	Tannadice Park
15:00	Erskine 70'	BBC Report		Attendance: 5,243; Referee: Dallas

18 April 2015 Scottish Premiership	Aberdeen	1–0	Dundee United	Pittodrie Stadium
15:00	Rooney 39'	BBC Report		Attendance: 12,619; Referee: Madden

26 April 2015 Scottish Premiership	Dundee United	0–3	Celtic	Tannadice Park
12:45		BBC Report	Griffiths 47', 65', 84'	Attendance: 8,329; Referee: Collum

2 May 2015 Scottish Premiership	Dundee United	1–0	Aberdeen	Tannadice Park
15:00	Muirhead 13'	BBC Report		Attendance: 8,686; Referee: Beaton

5 May 2015 Scottish Premiership	Inverness Caledonian Thistle	2–1	Dundee United	Caledonian Stadium
19:45	Ofere 38'; Williams 43'	BBC Report	Muirhead 2'	Attendance: 2,426; Referee: Murray

9 May 2015 Scottish Premiership	St Johnstone	1–1	Dundee United	McDiarmid Park
15:00	Davidson 77'	BBC Report	Rankin 68'	Attendance: 4,862; Referee: Clancy

16 May 2015 Scottish Premiership	Inverness Caledonian Thistle	3–0	Dundee United	Caledonian Stadium
15:00	Meekings 55'; Ross 80'; Warren 83'	BBC Report		Attendance: 3,508; Referee: Thomson

24 May 2015 Scottish Premiership	Dundee United	3–0	Dundee	Tannadice Park
12:30	Ciftci 8'; Ciftci 31' (pen.); Spittal 50'	BBC Report		Attendance: 10,812; Referee: Bobby Madden

=== Scottish League Cup ===
24 September 2014 Round 3	Dundee United	1–0	Dundee	Tannadice Park
19:45	Fojut 90'	BBC Report		Attendance: 13,041; Referee: Thomson

29 October 2014 Quarter Final	Hibernian	3–3 (a.e.t.) (6–7 p)	Dundee United	Easter Road
19:45	Malonga 17'; Cummings 57'; Kennedy 78'	BBC Report	Erskine 12'; Connolly 19'; Dow 61'	Attendance: 8,689; Referee: Beaton
	Penalties
	Allan (penalty scored); Craig (penalty scored); Hanlon (penalty scored); Harris (penalty scored); Malonga (penalty scored); Stanton (penalty scored); Kennedy (penalty missed); Gray (penalty missed)		Erskine (penalty scored); Souttar (penalty scored); Armstrong (penalty scored); Dow (penalty scored); Çiftçi (penalty scored); Spittal (penalty scored); Rankin (penalty missed); Townsend (penalty scored)

31 January 2015 Semi Final	Dundee United	2–1	Aberdeen	Hampden Park
15:00	Morris 60'; Çiftçi (yellow card) 66' (goal) 84'	Report	Daniels 49'; Jack (yellow card) 82'; Pawlett (yellow card) 83'	Attendance: 29,608; Referee: (Scotland) Steven McLean (referee)

15 March 2015 Final	Dundee United	0–2	Celtic	Hampden Park
14:30		Report	Commons 28'; Forrest 79'	Attendance: 49,259; Referee: Bobby Madden

=== Scottish Cup ===
29 November 2014 Round 4	Motherwell	1–2	Dundee United	Fir Park
15:00	Ojamaa 7'	BBC Report	Souttar 66'; Watson 82'	Attendance: 4,827; Referee: Thomson

8 February 2015 Round 5	Stranraer	0–3	Dundee United	Stair Park
12:30		BBC Report	Erskine 21'; Dow 27' 31'	Attendance: 1,491; Referee: Clancy

8 March 2015 Quarter Final	Dundee United	1–1	Celtic	Tannadice Park
15:30	Çiftçi 45' (pen.)	BBC Report	Griffiths 71'	Attendance: 10,504; Referee: Thomson

18 March 2015 Quarter Final Replay	Celtic	4–0	Dundee United	Celtic Park
19:45	Denayer 17'; Griffiths 57'; Commons 79'; Van Dijk 90+1'; Stokes (red card) 87'	Report		Attendance: 28,847; Referee: Calum Murray

== Player statistics ==
=== Squad information ===
As of 24 May 2015(UTC)

No.	Pos	Nat	Player	Total		Premiership		League Cup		Scottish Cup	
No.	Pos	Nat	Player	Apps	Goals	Apps	Goals	Apps	Goals	Apps	Goals
1	GK	(Poland) POL	Radosław Cierzniak	45	0	36+1	0	4+0	0	4+0	0
2	DF	(Republic of Ireland) IRL	Seán Dillon	33	1	26+1	1	3+0	0	3+0	0
3	DF	(England) ENG	Conor Townsend	19	0	16+1	0	1+0	0	1+0	0
3	DF	(Scotland) SCO	Paul Dixon	17	0	15+0	0	1+0	0	1+0	0
4	DF	(Scotland) SCO	John Souttar	15	1	13+0	0	1+0	0	1+0	1
5	DF	(Poland) POL	Jarosław Fojut	43	5	36+0	4	4+0	1	3+0	0
6	MF	(Northern Ireland) NIR	Paul Paton	32	2	22+2	2	4+0	0	4+0	0
7	FW	(Turkey) TUR	Nadir Çiftçi	42	16	34+2	14	2+1	1	3+0	1
8	MF	(Scotland) SCO	John Rankin	36	2	29+2	2	3+0	0	2+0	0
9	FW	(Scotland) SCO	Brian Graham	1	0	0+1	0	0+0	0	0+0	0
10	MF	(Scotland) SCO	Robbie Muirhead	13	2	6+7	2	0+0	0	0+0	0
10	MF	(Scotland) SCO	Stuart Armstrong	24	6	17+3	6	2+1	0	1+0	0
11	MF	(Scotland) SCO	Gary Mackay-Steven	25	5	14+7	5	2+1	0	1+0	0
12	DF	(Scotland) SCO	Keith Watson	16	2	14+0	1	1+0	0	1+0	1
13	GK	(Scotland) SCO	Marc McCallum	0	0	0+0	0	0+0	0	0+0	0
14	DF	(Republic of Ireland) IRL	Callum Morris	30	2	23+2	1	3+0	1	2+0	0
15	FW	(Scotland) SCO	Michael Gardyne	0	0	0+0	0	0+0	0	0+0	0
16	DF	(Australia) AUS	Ryan McGowan	17	1	12+0	1	2+0	0	3+0	0
17	MF	(Scotland) SCO	Chris Erskine	41	8	27+7	6	1+2	1	3+1	1
18	MF	(Scotland) SCO	Ryan Dow	32	5	17+7	2	3+1	1	4+0	2
19	FW	(Netherlands) NED	Mario Bilate	16	2	6+8	2	1+1	0	0+0	0
20	MF	(England) ENG	Calum Butcher	21	1	15+0	1	2+0	0	3+1	0
21	MF	(Scotland) SCO	Charlie Telfer	25	4	13+8	4	1+0	0	1+2	0
22	FW	(Scotland) SCO	Aidan Connolly	22	2	8+10	1	1+0	1	1+2	0
23	MF	(Scotland) SCO	Scott Smith	4	0	0+3	0	0+1	0	0+0	0
24	MF	(Scotland) SCO	Blair Spittal	30	2	13+12	2	2+1	0	1+1	0
25	FW	(Scotland) SCO	Jordan Moore	0	0	0+0	0	0+0	0	0+0	0
26	GK	(Poland) POL	Michał Szromnik	4	0	2+2	0	0+0	0	0+0	0
27	MF	(Scotland) SCO	Scott Fraser	0	0	0+0	0	0+0	0	0+0	0
28	FW	(Scotland) SCO	Kudus Oyenuga	0	0	0+0	0	0+0	0	0+0	0
29	MF	(Scotland) SCO	Darren Petrie	0	0	0+0	0	0+0	0	0+0	0
30	FW	(Estonia) EST	Henri Anier	16	1	4+8	1	0+2	0	1+1	0
33	DF	(Scotland) SCO	Euan Spark	2	0	0+2	0	0+0	0	0+0	0
49	FW	(Nigeria) NGR	Ola Adeyemo	2	0	0+1	0	0+0	0	0+1	0

=== Disciplinary record ===
As of 24 May 2015 (UTC)

Position	Nation	Number	Name	Premiership		League Cup		Scottish Cup		Total	
Position	Nation	Number	Name	Yellow card	Red card	Yellow card	Red card	Yellow card	Red card	Yellow card	Red card
1	(Poland)	GK	Radosław Cierzniak	0	0	1	0	1	0	2	0
2	(Republic of Ireland)	DF	Seán Dillon	1	0	0	1	0	0	1	1
3	(England)	DF	Conor Townsend	2	0	0	0	1	0	3	0
3	(Scotland)	DF	Paul Dixon	4	0	0	0	0	1	4	1
4	(Scotland)	DF	John Souttar	3	0	0	0	0	0	3	0
5	(Poland)	DF	Jarosław Fojut	9	0	1	0	0	0	10	0
6	(Northern Ireland)	MF	Paul Paton	10	0	2	0	1	1	13	1
7	(Turkey)	MF	Nadir Çiftçi	8	1	1	0	2	0	11	1
8	(Scotland)	MF	John Rankin	4	0	1	0	1	0	6	0
10	(Scotland)	MF	Stuart Armstrong	1	0	0	0	0	0	1	0
11	(Scotland)	MF	Gary Mackay-Steven	1	0	0	0	0	0	1	0
12	(Scotland)	DF	Keith Watson	5	0	1	0	0	0	6	0
14	(Republic of Ireland)	DF	Callum Morris	5	0	0	0	0	0	5	0
16	(Australia)	DF	Ryan McGowan	3	0	0	0	1	1	4	1
17	(Scotland)	MF	Chris Erskine	2	0	0	0	0	0	2	0
18	(Scotland)	MF	Ryan Dow	2	0	0	0	2	0	4	0
19	(Netherlands)	FW	Mario Bilate	1	0	0	0	0	0	1	0
20	(England)	MF	Calum Butcher	6	0	0	0	1	0	7	0
21	(Scotland)	MF	Charlie Telfer	2	0	0	0	0	0	2	0
22	(Scotland)	MF	Aidan Connolly	0	0	0	0	0	0	0	0
26	(Poland)	GK	Michał Szromnik	0	1	0	0	0	0	0	1
30	(Estonia)	FW	Henri Anier	1	0	0	0	0	0	1	0
33	(Scotland)	DF	Euan Spark	1	0	0	0	0	0	1	0
49	(Nigeria)	FW	Ola Adeyemo	1	0	0	0	0	0	1	0
Total				72	2	7	1	10	3	89	6

== Team statistics ==
=== League table ===
Pos	Team	Pld	W	D	L	GF	GA	GD	Pts	Qualification or relegation
3	Inverness Caledonian Thistle	38	19	8	11	52	42	+10	65	Qualification for the Europa League second qualifying round (Note: Inverness Caledonian Thistle qualified for the second qualifying round of the UEFA Europa League by winning the 2014–15 Scottish Cup.)
4	St Johnstone	38	16	9	13	34	34	0	57	Qualification for the Europa League first qualifying round
5	Dundee United	38	17	5	16	58	56	+2	56	
6	Dundee (Note: Teams in the bottom six at the time of the split (33 games) cannot pass teams in the top six)	38	11	12	15	46	57	−11	45	
7	Hamilton Academical	38	15	8	15	50	53	−3	53	

Source: SPFL
Rules for classification: 1) points; 2) goal difference; 3) number of goals scored

=== Division summary ===
Round	1	2	3	4	5	6	7	8	9	10	11	12	13	14	15	16	17	18	19	20	21	22	23	24	25	26	27	28	29	30	31	32	33	34	35	36	37	38
Ground	A	H	A	H	A	H	A	H	A	H	A	H	A	H	A	H	H	A	H	A	A	A	H	A	H	H	H	A	H	A	H	A	H	H	A	A	A	H
Result	W	W	L	W	W	D	W	W	L	W	L	W	L	W	W	L	W	L	W	D	W	D	W	L	L	D	L	L	L	L	W	L	L	W	L	D	L	W
Position	1	2	4	4	3	4	1	1	2	2	4	2	3	3	3	3	2	3	3	4	3	3	4	4	4	4	4	4	4	4	4	4	4	5	4	4	5	5

Updated to match(es) played on 24 May 2015. Source:
A = Away; H = Home; W = Win; D = Draw; L = Loss

=== Management statistics ===
Last updated on 24 May 2015

Name	From	To	P	W	D	L	Win% (Note: Win% is the percentage of matches won rounded to two decimal places.)
Jackie McNamara	10 August 2014	24 May 2015	38	17	5	16	44.74

== Transfers ==
=== Players in ===
Player	From	Fee
(Scotland) Charlie Telfer	(Scotland) Rangers	£204,000
(Scotland) Blair Spittal	(Scotland) Queen's Park	Free
(Republic of Ireland) Callum Morris	(Scotland) Dunfermline Athletic	Free
(Poland) Jarosław Fojut	(Norway) Tromsø	Free
(Netherlands) Mario Bilate	(Netherlands) Sparta Rotterdam	Free
(England) Conor Townsend	(England) Hull City	Loan
(Poland) Michał Szromnik	(Poland) Arka Gdynia	Undisclosed
(Scotland) Simon Murray	(Scotland) Arbroath	£50,000
(Estonia) Henri Anier	(Germany) Erzgebirge Aue	Undisclosed
(Australia) Ryan McGowan	(China) Shandong Taishan	Free
(Scotland) Robbie Muirhead	(Scotland) Kilmarnock	£150,000
(Scotland) Paul Dixon	(England) Huddersfield Town	Free
(Netherlands) Justin Johnson	(England) FC United of Manchester	Free

=== Players out ===
Player	To	Fee
(Republic of Ireland) Gavin Gunning	(England) Birmingham City	Free
(Senegal) Morgaro Gomis	(Scotland) Heart of Midlothian	Free
(Scotland) Dale Hilson	(Scotland) Forfar Athletic	Free
(Scotland) Mark Millar	(Scotland) Peterhead	Free
(Scotland) Ryan Gauld	(Portugal) Sporting CP	£3,000,000
(Scotland) Andrew Robertson	(England) Hull City	£2,850,000
(England) Kudus Oyenuga	(Scotland) Cowdenbeath	Loan
(Scotland) Brian Graham	(Scotland) St Johnstone	Loan
(Scotland) Michael Gardyne	(Scotland) Ross County	Loan
(Scotland) Scott Fraser	(Scotland) Airdrieonians	Loan
(Northern Ireland) Adam Harwood	(Scotland) Montrose	Loan
(Northern Ireland) Joe McGovern	(Scotland) Montrose	Loan
(Scotland) Scott Smith	(Scotland) Forfar Athletic	Loan
(Scotland) Simon Murray	(Scotland) Arbroath	Loan
(Scotland) Mark Wilson	(Scotland) Dumbarton	Free
(Scotland) Keith Watson	(Scotland) Hibernian	Loan
(Scotland) Darren Petrie	(Scotland) Dumbarton	Loan
(Nigeria) Ola Adeyemo	(Scotland) East Fife	Loan
(Scotland) Gary Mackay-Steven	(Scotland) Celtic	£250,000
(Scotland) Stuart Armstrong	(Scotland) Celtic	£2,000,000

== See also ==
- List of Dundee United F.C. seasons
