= Henri Anier =

Estonian footballer (born 1990)

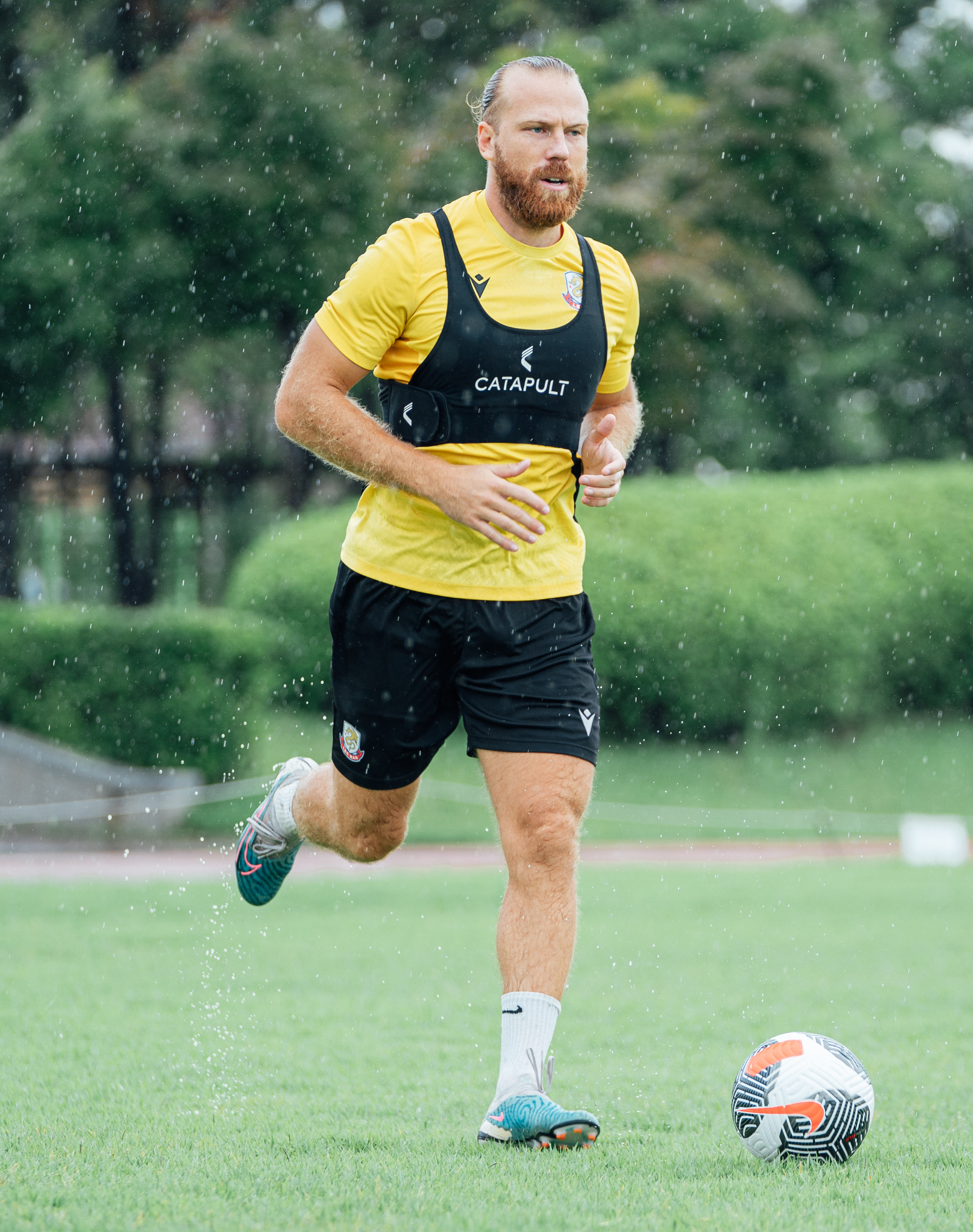
- Anier playing for Lee Man in 2023

Personal information
- Date of birth: 17 December 1990 (age 35)
- Place of birth: Tallinn, Estonia
- Height: 1.83 m (6 ft 0 in)
- Position: Striker

Team information
- Current team: Paide Linnameeskond
- Number: 9

Youth career
- 1997–2007: Flora
- 2009–2010: → Sampdoria (loan)

Senior career*
Years	Team	Apps	(Gls)
2008–2009	Flora II	8	(7)
2008–2011	Flora	86	(52)
2007	→ Warrior (loan)	24	(13)
2012	Viking 2	6	(4)
2012–2014	Viking	16	(0)
2013	→ Fredrikstad (loan)	13	(3)
2013–2014	→ Motherwell (loan)	19	(7)
2014	Motherwell	14	(2)
2014–2015	Erzgebirge Aue	6	(0)
2015–2016	Dundee United	20	(2)
2015–2016	→ Hibernian (loan)	3	(0)
2016	Kalmar FF	9	(1)
2017	Inverness Caledonian Thistle	13	(0)
2017–2018	Lahti	45	(11)
2019	Suwon FC	21	(4)
2020	Go Ahead Eagles	2	(0)
2020–2021	Paide Linnameeskond	41	(36)
2022–2023	Muangthong United	31	(11)
2023–2025	Lee Man	41	(28)
2025–	Paide Linnameeskond	37	(17)

International career^{‡}
2006	Estonia U17	3	(0)
2007–2009	Estonia U19	19	(2)
2008–2012	Estonia U21	21	(2)
2010	Estonia U23	1	(0)
2011–	Estonia	104	(23)
- * Club domestic league appearances and goals as of 17 November 2026 ‡ National team caps and goals as of 9 September 2025 (UTC)

Henri Anier (born 17 December 1990) is an Estonian professional footballer who plays as a striker for Paide Linnameeskond and the Estonia national team.

== Club career ==
=== Flora ===
Anier came through the Flora youth system. He moved to Esiliiga club Warrior on loan for the 2007 season, and scored 13 goals in 24 league appearances. In January 2008, Anier was promoted to Flora's first team. He made his debut in the Meistriliiga on 8 March 2008, in a 1–1 home draw against Nõmme Kalju. On 29 March 2008, aged 17 years 103 days, Anier became Flora's youngest ever goalscorer in the Meistriliiga when he scored in a 3–0 away win over Tallinna Kalev.

In August 2009, Anier joined Italian club Sampdoria on a season-long loan, where he played for the club's Primavera side.

Anier returned to Flora in July 2010. He scored 13 goals in 16 appearances and won his first Meistriliiga title in the 2010 season. He won his second Meistriliiga title in the 2011 season, and was Flora's top goalscorer with 21 goals.

=== Viking ===
On 20 December 2011, Anier signed a three-year contract with Norwegian Tippeligaen club Viking. He made his debut in the Tippeligaen on 26 March 2012, in a 2–2 away draw against Sandnes Ulf.

==== Loan to Fredrikstad ====
On 4 April 2013, Anier joined Adeccoligaen club Fredrikstad on loan until 15 July.

=== Motherwell ===
On 29 July 2013, Anier joined Scottish Premiership club Motherwell on an initial six-month loan, after being recommended by his Estonian teammate Henrik Ojamaa, who left the club the previous month. He made his first official appearance for Motherwell on 1 August 2013, in a 2–0 loss to Kuban Krasnodar in the first leg of the UEFA Europa League third qualifying round. Anier made his debut in the Scottish Premiership on 4 August 2013, coming on as a substitute for Robert McHugh in the 69th minute and scoring the only goal of an away win over Hibernian. On 10 January 2014, Anier signed for Motherwell permanently on a two-and-a-half-year contract. He ended the 2013–14 season with 9 goals in 37 appearances in all competitions for the Steelmen.

=== Erzgebirge Aue ===
On 19 June 2014, Anier and his brother Hannes signed three-year contracts with German 2. Bundesliga side Erzgebirge Aue. He made his debut for the club on 9 August 2014, in a 5–1 home loss to VfL Bochum. Anier made eight appearances for Erzgebirge Aue, but struggled to break into the first team under new manager Tomislav Stipić.

=== Dundee United ===
On 15 January 2015, Anier returned to the Scottish Premiership, signing a two-and-a-half-year contract with Dundee United. He made his debut for the club on 21 January 2015, in a 1–1 away draw against St Mirren.

Dundee United were relegated from the Scottish Premiership in the 2015–16 season. On 8 August 2016, Anier left Dundee United after his contract was cancelled by mutual consent.

==== Loan to Hibernian ====
On 1 September 2015, Anier joined Scottish Championship side Hibernian on a season-long loan. However, on 14 January 2016, he was recalled by relegation-threatened Dundee United.

=== Kalmar FF ===
On 10 August 2016, Anier signed for Swedish Allsvenskan club Kalmar FF until the end of the 2016 season. He made his debut in the Allsvenskan on 14 August 2016, in a 1–1 home draw against Malmö FF. On 17 September 2016, Anier scored his first goal for the club in a 2–0 home win over Östersunds FK.

=== Inverness Caledonian Thistle ===
On 16 January 2017, Anier returned to Scottish football, signing for Inverness Caledonian Thistle until the end of the 2016–17 season. He made his debut for the club on 21 January, in a 2–1 away victory over Elgin City in the fourth round of the Scottish Cup.

=== FC Lahti ===
On 10 July 2017, Anier signed a one-and-a-half-year contract with Veikkausliiga club FC Lahti.

=== Suwon FC ===
On 1 February 2019, South Korean club Suwon FC announced the signing of Anier.

=== Go Ahead Eagles ===
In February 2020, Anier moved to Netherlands to join Go Ahead Eagles.

=== Paide Linnameeskond ===
On 14 August 2020, Anier moved back to his native country after 8 years joining Paide Linnameeskond.

=== Muangthong United ===
On 4 January 2022, Anier moved to Thailand to join Thai League 1 side, Muangthong United.

=== Lee Man ===
On 8 July 2023, Hong Kong Premier League club Lee Man announced the signing of Anier.

== International career ==
Anier began his youth career in 2006 with the Estonia under-17 team. He also represented the under-19, under-21, and under-23 national sides.

On 25 May 2011, Anier made an unofficial senior debut for Estonia, in a 2–1 home loss to Basque Country in a non-FIFA match. On 10 June 2011, he was named by manager Tarmo Rüütli in the Estonia squad to face Chile and Uruguay in friendly matches. Anier made his senior international debut in a 4–0 lost to Chile on 19 June 2011. He scored his first international goal on 8 November 2012, in a 2–1 away win over Oman in a friendly.

On 22 March 2025, Anier featured in his 100th international match for Estonia in a 2–1 away defeat against Israel during the 2026 FIFA World Cup qualification.

== Personal life ==
Anier's younger brother Hannes is also a professional footballer.

== Career statistics ==
=== Club ===
As of 2 December 2025

Appearances and goals by club, season and competition
Club	Season	League			National cup (Note: Includes the Estonian Cup, the Norwegian Cup, the Scottish Cup, the DFB-Pokal, the KNVB Cup, the Thai FA Cup, and the Hong Kong FA Cup)		League cup (Note: Includes the Scottish League Cup, the Thai League Cup, and the HKPLC Cup)		Continental (Note: Includes the UEFA Champions League, the UEFA Europa League, the UEFA Europa Conference League, and the AFC Champions League)		Other (Note: Includes the Baltic League, the Estonian Supercup, and the Hong Kong Senior Challenge Shield)		Total	
Club	Season	Division	Apps	Goals	Apps	Goals	Apps	Goals	Apps	Goals	Apps	Goals	Apps	Goals
Warrior (loan)	2007	Esiliiga	24	13	0	0	—		—		—		24	13
Flora II	2008	Esiliiga	6	7	0	0	—		—		—		6	7
Flora II	2009	Esiliiga	2	0	0	0	—		—		—		2	0
Flora II	Total		8	7	0	0	—		—		—		8	7
Flora	2008	Meistriliiga	28	15	4	3	—		2	0	2	0	36	18
Flora	2009	Meistriliiga	10	3	4	3	—		1	0	1	0	16	6
Flora	2010	Meistriliiga	16	13	2	0	—		0	0	2	0	20	13
Flora	2011	Meistriliiga	32	21	5	10	—		2	0	2	0	41	31
Flora	Total		86	52	15	16	—		5	0	7	0	113	68
Viking 2	2012	3. divisjon	6	4	—		—		—		—		6	4
Viking	2012	Tippeligaen	16	0	2	1	—		—		—		18	1
Viking	2013	Tippeligaen	0	0	0	0	—		—		—		0	0
Viking	Total		16	0	2	1	—		—		—		18	1
Fredrikstad (loan)	2013	Adeccoligaen	13	3	3	2	—		—		—		16	5
Motherwell	2013–14	Scottish Premiership	33	9	1	0	1	0	2	0	—		37	9
Erzgebirge Aue	2014–15	2. Bundesliga	6	0	2	0	—		—		—		8	0
Dundee United	2014–15	Scottish Premiership	12	1	2	0	2	0	—		—		16	1
Dundee United	2015–16	Scottish Premiership	7	1	2	2	0	0	—		—		9	3
Dundee United	2016–17	Scottish Championship	1	0	0	0	4	2	—		—		5	2
Dundee United	Total		20	2	4	2	6	2	—		—		30	6
Hibernian (loan)	2015–16	Scottish Championship	3	0	0	0	0	0	—		0	0	3	0
Kalmar FF	2016	Allsvenskan	9	1	0	0	—		—		—		9	1
Inverness Caledonian Thistle	2016–17	Scottish Premiership	13	0	2	0	0	0	—		—		15	0
FC Lahti	2017	Veikkausliiga	14	6	0	0	—		—		—		14	6
FC Lahti	2018	Veikkausliiga	31	5	5	3	—		2	0	—		38	8
FC Lahti	Total		45	11	5	3	—		2	0	—		52	14
Suwon FC	2019	K League 2	21	4	—		—		—		—		21	4
Go Ahead Eagles	2019–20	Eerste Divisie	2	0	0	0	—		—		—		2	0
Paide Linnameeskond	2020	Meistriliiga	11	10	—		—		1	0	—		12	10
Paide Linnameeskond	2021	Meistriliiga	30	26	1	8	—		2	0	1	0	34	34
Paide Linnameeskond	2025	Meistriliiga	13	7									13	7
Paide Linnameeskond	Total		54	43	1	8	—		3	0	1	0	59	51
Muangthong United	2021–22	Thai League 1	14	8	1	0	0	0	—		—		15	8
Muangthong United	2022–23	Thai League 1	17	3	1	1	1	1	—		—		19	5
Muangthong United	Total		31	11	2	1	1	1	—		—		34	13
Lee Man	2023–24	Hong Kong Premier League	20	17	2	0	2	2	2	0	2	0	28	19
Lee Man	2024–25	Hong Kong Premier League	20	11	1	1	3	1	6	0	3	5	33	18
Lee Man	Total		40	28	3	2	5	3	8	1	5	5	61	37
Career total			430	188	40	34	13	6	20	0	13	5	516	233

=== International ===
As of match played 9 September 2025

Appearances and goals by national team and year
National team	Year	Apps	Goals
Estonia	2011	2	0
Estonia	2012	2	1
Estonia	2013	9	4
Estonia	2014	8	1
Estonia	2015	2	0
Estonia	2016	11	1
Estonia	2017	13	3
Estonia	2018	9	2
Estonia	2019	5	1
Estonia	2020	4	0
Estonia	2021	12	4
Estonia	2022	7	4
Estonia	2023	8	1
Estonia	2024	7	1
Estonia	2025	5	0
Total		104	23

As of 11 June 2024
Scores and results list Estonia's goal tally first, score column indicates score after each Anier goal.

List of international goals scored by Henri Anier
No.	Date	Venue	Cap	Opponent	Score	Result	Competition
1	8 November 2012	Sultan Qaboos Stadium, Muscat, Oman	3	Oman	1–1	2–1	Friendly
2	26 March 2013	A. Le Coq Arena, Tallinn, Estonia	5	Andorra	1–0	2–0	2014 FIFA World Cup qualification
3	7 June 2013	A. Le Coq Arena, Tallinn, Estonia	7	Trinidad and Tobago	1–0	1–0	Friendly
4	19 November 2013	Rheinpark Stadion, Vaduz, Liechtenstein	13	Liechtenstein	2–0	3–0	Friendly
5	19 November 2013	Rheinpark Stadion, Vaduz, Liechtenstein	13	Liechtenstein	3–0	3–0	Friendly
6	18 November 2014	A. Le Coq Arena, Tallinn, Estonia	21	Jordan	1–0	1–0	Friendly
7	13 November 2016	King Baudouin Stadium, Brussels, Belgium	32	Belgium	1–3	1–8	2018 FIFA World Cup qualification
8	12 November 2017	National Stadium, Ta' Qali, Malta	44	Malta	3–0	3–0	Friendly
9	19 November 2017	ANZ Stadium, Suva, Fiji	45	Fiji	1–0	2–0	Friendly
10	26 November 2017	Stade Numa-Daly Magenta, Nouméa, New Caledonia	47	New Caledonia	1–0	1–1	Friendly
11	7 January 2018	Zayed Sports City Stadium, Abu Dhabi, United Arab Emirates	48	Sweden	1–0	1–1	Friendly
12	15 October 2018	A. Le Coq Arena, Tallinn, Estonia	55	Hungary	3–2	3–3	2018–19 UEFA Nations League C
13	11 January 2019	Khalifa International Stadium, Doha, Qatar	57	Finland	2–0	2–1	Friendly
14	24 March 2021	Arena Lublin, Lublin, Poland	66	Czech Republic	2–6	2–6	2022 FIFA World Cup qualification
15	27 March 2021	Dinamo Stadium, Minsk, Belarus	67	Belarus	1–0	2–4	2022 FIFA World Cup qualification
16	27 March 2021	Dinamo Stadium, Minsk, Belarus	67	Belarus	2–1	2–4	2022 FIFA World Cup qualification
17	1 June 2021	LFF Stadium, Vilnius, Lithuania	69	Lithuania	1–0	1–0	2020 Baltic Cup
18	9 June 2022	National Stadium, Ta' Qali, Malta	82	Malta	2–1	2–1	2022–23 UEFA Nations League D
19	23 September 2022	A. Le Coq Arena, Tallinn, Estonia	83	Malta	2–1	2–1	2022–23 UEFA Nations League D
20	26 September 2022	San Marino Stadium, Serravalle, San Marino	84	San Marino	1–0	4–0	2022–23 UEFA Nations League D
21	26 September 2022	San Marino Stadium, Serravalle, San Marino	84	San Marino	4–0	4–0	2022–23 UEFA Nations League D
22	17 October 2023	Lilleküla Stadium, Tallinn, Estonia	90	Thailand	1–0	1–1	Friendly
23	8 June 2024	Lilleküla Stadium, Tallinn, Estonia	95	Faroe Islands	2–1	4–1	2024 Baltic Cup

== Honours ==
Flora

- Meistriliiga: 2010, 2011
- Estonian Cup: 2007–08, 2008–09, 2010–11
- Estonian Supercup: 2009, 2011

Lee Man

- Hong Kong Premier League: 2023–24

Estonia

- Baltic Cup: 2020, 2024

Individual

- Meistriliiga Team of the season: 2020
- Meistriliiga Player of the Month: March/April 2021,
- Meistriliiga Top goalscorer: 2021
- Hong Kong Premier League Top goalscorer: 2023–24
- Hong Kong Premier League Team of the Season: 2023–24

== See also ==
- List of men's footballers with 100 or more international caps
