= Hannes Anier =

Estonian footballer (born 1993)

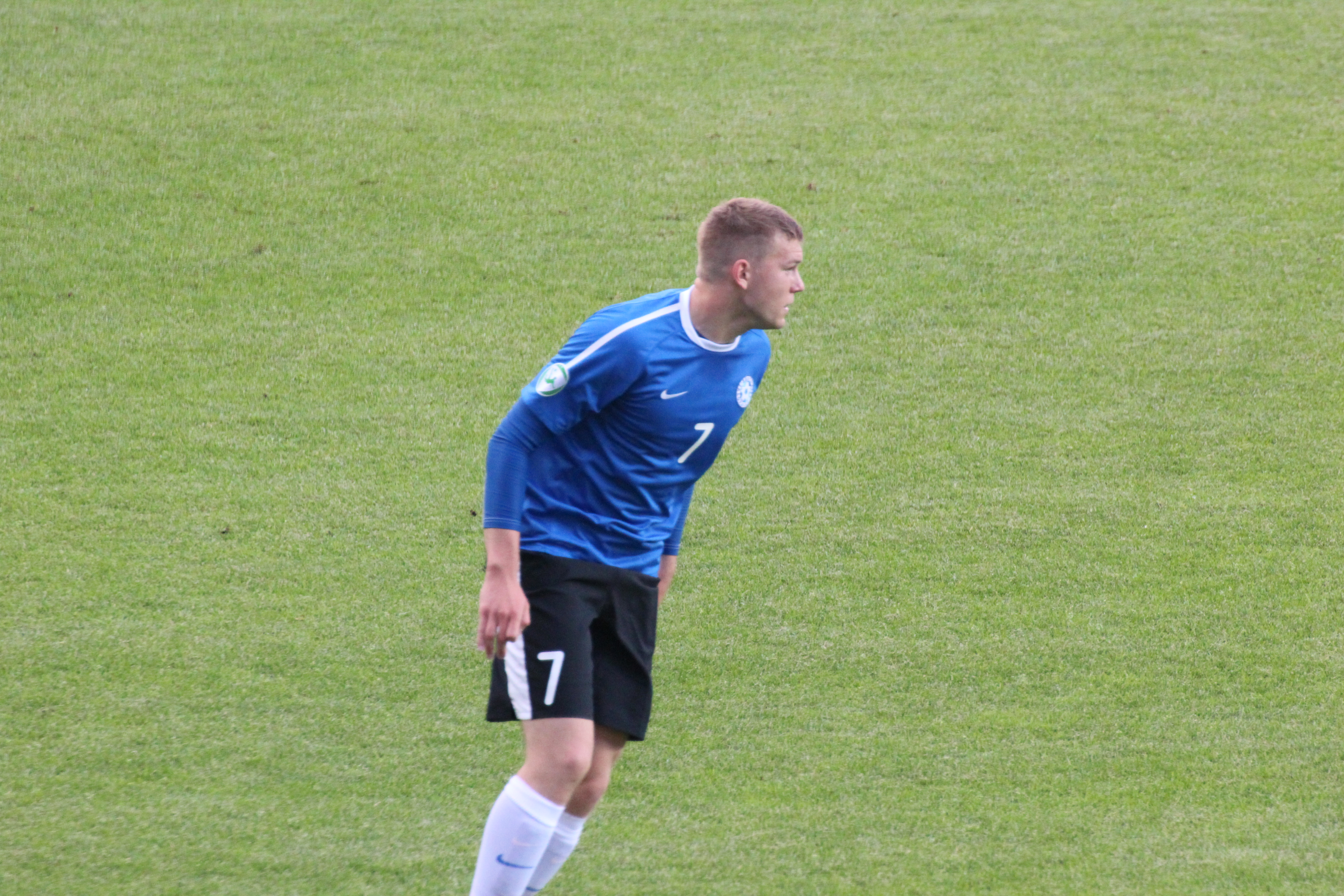
- Anier in 2012

Personal information
- Date of birth: 16 January 1993 (age 33)
- Place of birth: Tallinn, Estonia
- Height: 1.82 m (6 ft 0 in)
- Position: Forward

Youth career
- Flora

Senior career*
Years	Team	Apps	(Gls)
2009–2011	Flora	27	(11)
2009–2011	→ Flora II	42	(19)
2012–2013	OB	4	(0)
2014–2015	Erzgebirge Aue	0	(0)
2015–2018	Flora	8	(0)
2016–2017	→ Flora U21	16	(6)
2018	Thisted FC	6	(0)
2018–2020	Tallinna Kalev	60	(17)
2021	FCI Levadia	14	(3)
2022	Tallinna Kalev	26	(3)

International career^{‡}
2008	Estonia U16	3	(0)
2008–2009	Estonia U17	12	(0)
2010	Estonia U18	1	(0)
2010–2012	Estonia U19	13	(4)
2011–2014	Estonia U21	20	(4)
2014–2016	Estonia U23	3	(0)
2014	Estonia	4	(1)
- * Club domestic league appearances and goals as of 1 January 2023 ‡ National team caps and goals as of 27 February 2018

Hannes Anier (born 16 January 1993) is an Estonian professional footballer who plays as a forward.

== Club career ==
Anier started his career at Flora. He remained there until 2012, after which he was recruited by Danish Odense Boldklub signing a three-year contract. Anier did not manage to get enough playing time for the first team and the contract was ended in 2013. After leaving Denmark, Anier went on trial with Scottish Premiership side Partick Thistle, Norwegian Tippeligaen side Strømsgodset and HJK before signing with German 2. Bundesliga club Erzgebirge Aue on a three-year deal until 2017. Anier played his first game for Erzgebirge Aue on 24 July 2014 in a friendly match against Bundesliga side VfB Stuttgart coming on as a substitute in the 72nd minute. His contract was terminated prematurely in early February 2015, after Anier had never been played for the club's first team.

== International career ==
Anier made his Estonia debut against Iceland on 4 June 2014. He scored his first goal on his second match against Tajikistan on 7 June 2014.

== Personal life ==
Anier's older brother Henri Anier is also a professional footballer.

== Career statistics ==
Estonia score listed first, score column indicates score after each Anier goal.

International goals by date, venue, cap, opponent, score, result and competition
No.	Date	Venue	Cap	Opponent	Score	Result	Competition
1	7 June 2014	A. Le Coq Arena, Tallinn, Estonia	2	Tajikistan	2–1	2–1	Friendly

== Honours ==
Flora

- Meistriliiga: 2011, 2017
- Estonian Cup: 2010–11
- Estonian Supercup: 2011
