= Euan Spark =

Scottish footballer (born 1996)

Personal information
- Date of birth: 29 November 1996 (age 29)
- Place of birth: Dundee, Scotland
- Position: Defender

Team information
- Current team: Brechin City

Youth career
- 2006–2014: Dundee United

Senior career*
Years	Team	Apps	(Gls)
2014–2016	Dundee United	3	(0)
2016	→ Forfar Athletic (loan)	14	(0)
2016–2017	Dunfermline Athletic	0	(0)
2017	→ Berwick Rangers (loan)	16	(0)
2017–2019	Brechin City	53	(0)
2019–2022	Elgin City	65	(1)
2022–	Brechin City	104	(9)
- * Club domestic league appearances and goals as of 01:43, 13 June 2022

Euan Spark (born 29 November 1996) is a Scottish footballer who plays as a defender for Lowland League East club Brechin City. Spark has previously played for Dundee United, Dunfermline Athletic, Forfar Athletic, Berwick Rangers, Brechin City and Elgin City.

== Early life ==
Spark was born in Dundee. He grew up in Edzell, Angus, and attended Mearns Academy.

== Playing career ==
=== Dundee United ===
After being scouted by Dundee United, he joined the club's youth setup at the age of nine along with Ryan Gauld and John Souttar. Progressing through the various youth levels, Spark signed a professional contract with the club in July 2012. After impressing for the under-20 team, his contract was extended in November 2013 to run until May 2016. Spark made his competitive first team debut for Dundee United as a substitute in a Scottish Premiership match against St Mirren on 30 August 2014.

In February 2016, Spark moved on loan to Scottish League One side Forfar Athletic. He was released by Dundee United at the end of the 2015–16 season, following their relegation from the Scottish Premiership.

=== Dunfermline Athletic ===
After leaving Dundee United, Spark appeared as a trialist in three pre-season matches for Scottish Championship team Dunfermline Athletic before signing a one-year contract with them in July 2016. After playing for the Dunfermline development squad, he was loaned out for the remainder of the season to Scottish League Two club Berwick Rangers on 27 January 2017. Upon returning from his loan deal, Spark was subsequently released from Dunfermline after the club decided not to re-apply for the 2017–18 SPFL Development League.

=== Brechin City ===
Spark signed for Brechin City in June 2017. He left the club at the end of the 2018–19 season.

=== Elgin City ===
On 28 June 2019, Spark signed for Elgin City. On 4 May 2022, it was announced that Spark had left the club following the end of the 2021–22 season.

=== Brechin City (2nd spell) ===
In May 2022, Spark signed a pre-contract agreement with Brechin City to join them for his second spell.

== Career statistics ==
As of match played 23 April 2022

Appearances and goals by club, season and competition
Club	Season	League			Scottish Cup		League Cup		Other		Total	
Club	Season	Division	Apps	Goals	Apps	Goals	Apps	Goals	Apps	Goals	Apps	Goals
Dundee United	2012–13	Scottish Premier League	0	0	0	0	0	0	0	0	0	0
Dundee United	2013–14	Scottish Premiership	0	0	0	0	0	0	–		0	0
Dundee United	2014–15	Scottish Premiership	2	0	0	0	0	0	–		2	0
Dundee United	2015–16	Scottish Premiership	1	0	0	0	0	0	–		1	0
Dundee United	Total		3	0	0	0	0	0	0	0	3	0
Forfar Athletic (loan)	2015–16	Scottish League One	14	0	0	0	0	0	0	0	14	0
Dunfermline Athletic	2016–17	Scottish Championship	0	0	0	0	0	0	0	0	0	0
Berwick Rangers (loan)	2016–17	Scottish League Two	16	0	0	0	0	0	0	0	16	0
Brechin City	2017–18	Scottish Championship	28	0	1	0	3	0	1 (Note: Appearance in the Scottish Challenge Cup)	0	33	0
Brechin City	2018–19	Scottish League One	25	0	1	0	3	0	1	0	30	0
Brechin City	Total		53	0	2	0	6	0	2	0	63	0
Elgin City	2019–20	Scottish League Two	21	1	2	0	4	0	5	0	32	1
Elgin City	2020–21	Scottish League Two	22	0	1	0	4	0	2 (Note: Two appearances in the League One play-offs)	0	29	0
Elgin City	2021–22	Scottish League Two	22	0	2	0	1	0	2	0	27	0
Elgin City	Total		65	1	5	0	9	0	9	0	88	0
Career total			151	1	7	0	15	0	11	0	184	1
