= Mario Bilate =

Association footballer (born 1991)

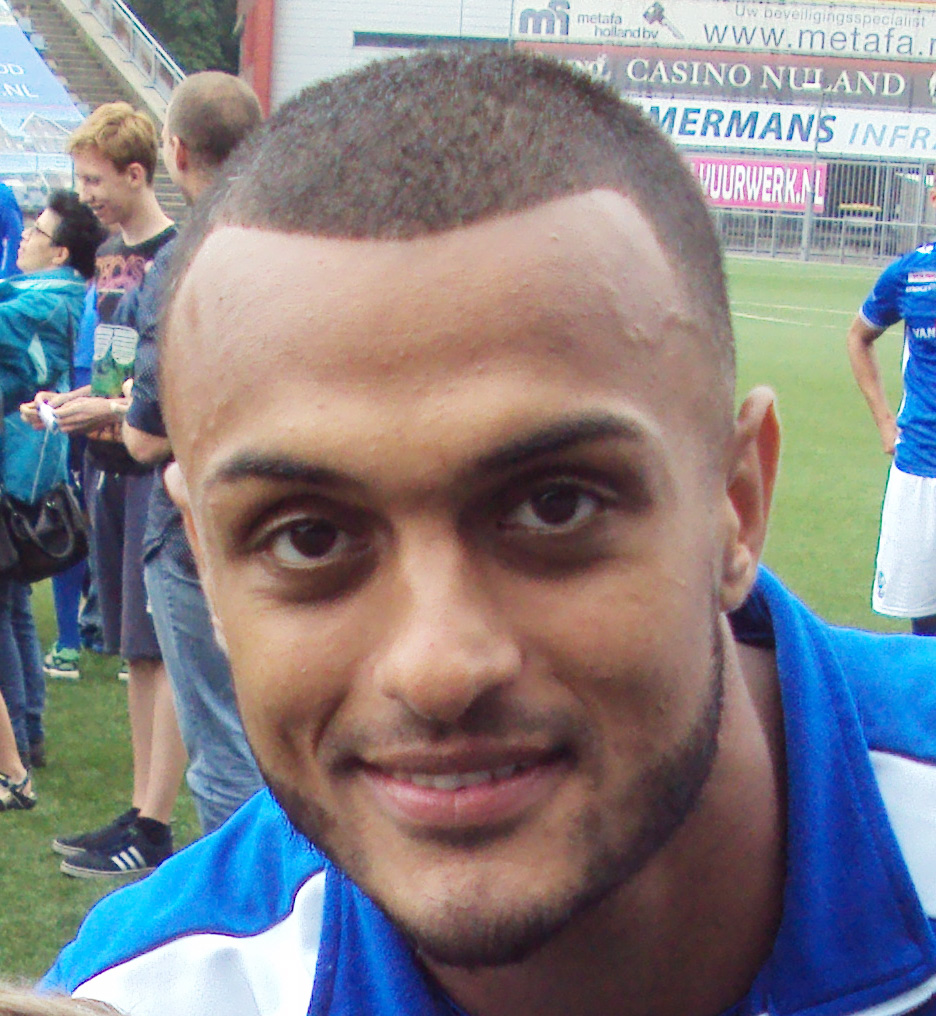

Personal information
- Full name: Mario Amare Bilate
- Date of birth: 16 July 1991 (age 35)
- Place of birth: Moscow, Soviet Union
- Height: 1.90 m (6 ft 3 in)
- Position: Striker

Team information
- Current team: Smitshoek

Youth career
- Sparta
- XerxesDZB

Senior career*
Years	Team	Apps	(Gls)
2010–2011	XerxesDZB	10	(7)
2011–2014	Sparta	77	(17)
2014–2015	Dundee United	16	(2)
2016–2017	Den Bosch	30	(3)
2017–2018	Emmen	17	(2)
2018–2020	RKC	32	(7)
2020–2022	NAC	34	(9)
2022–2023	ADO Den Haag	22	(2)
2023–2024	Kozakken Boys	19	(6)
2024–	Smitshoek		
- * Club domestic league appearances and goals as of 10:05, 6 October 2024 (UTC)

Mario Amare Bilate (born 16 July 1991) is a professional footballer who plays as a striker for Smitshoek.

== Playing career ==
=== XerxesDZB ===
Bilate broke into the XerxesDZB first team in March 2010 and scored seven goals in the ten games he appeared in. His form was impressive enough to win him a move to Sparta Rotterdam, where he had played earlier as a youth.

=== Sparta Rotterdam ===
Bilate joined Sparta Rotterdam in January 2011 on a two-and-a-half-year deal. He made his competitive debut on 7 August 2011 in a 1–0 win over Fortuna Sittard. In the summer of 2012 Bilate then signed a contract extension to keep him at the club until 2015.

=== Dundee United ===
Bilate was released from his Sparta Rotterdam contract a year early and signed a two-year contract with Dundee United in July 2014. Bilate had originally been set to join Eerste Divisie champions Willem II but the move fell through at the last minute after the Sparta Rotterdam board decided they wanted a transfer fee. He made his debut as a substitute in Dundee United's opening match of the 2014–15 season, a 3–0 win against Aberdeen on 10 August 2014. He then scored the winning goal on his home debut three days later, in a 1–0 victory over Motherwell, again after coming off the bench. He was released from his contract at Tannadice in November 2015, after making only two appearances in the 2015–16 season.

=== Return to the Netherlands ===
Bilate signed a one-year contract with Den Bosch on 30 June 2016, with an option for another year.

On 7 June 2017, Bilate signed a one-year deal with an option for an extra season with Emmen. One year later, in June 2018, he signed a one-year contract with RKC Waalwijk with an option for one more season. He was promoted to the Eredivisie with RKC in the 2018–19 season.

On 11 September 2020, Bilate was involved in a swap deal between RKC and NAC Breda, with him leaving for the latter and Finn Stokkers moving to the former. His contract was not extended after the 2021–22 season, effectively making him a free agent. According to him, he had been injured for six months due to mismanagement within the club, and had to find out through media reports that his contract had not been extended.

On 30 August 2022, Bilate signed a one-year contract with ADO Den Haag.

On 21 July 2023, Bilate signed a two-year contract with Kozakken Boys in the third-tier Tweede Divisie. After suffering relegation with them he joined Smitshoek a year later.

== Personal life ==
Bilate's father, Amare, is Ethiopian, he met Mario's Russian mother Marina in Moscow when Amare was enrolled in the Moscow Conservatory to become a conductor and Marina was a student of singing at Gnessin State Musical College. The family moved to the Netherlands when Mario was one-and-a-half-years old.

== Career statistics ==
As of match played 1 June 2024

Appearances and goals by club, season and competition
Club	Season	League			National cup		League cup		Other		Total	
Club	Season	Division	Apps	Goals	Apps	Goals	Apps	Goals	Apps	Goals	Apps	Goals
Sparta Rotterdam	2011–12	Eerste Divisie	25	6	1	0	—		2	0	28	6
Sparta Rotterdam	2012–13	Eerste Divisie	26	4	2	0	—		4	1	32	5
Sparta Rotterdam	2013–14	Eerste Divisie	26	7	0	0	—		3	0	29	7
Sparta Rotterdam	Total		77	17	3	0	—		9	1	89	18
Dundee United	2014–15	Scottish Premiership	14	2	0	0	2	0	0	0	16	2
Dundee United	2015–16	Scottish Premiership	2	0	0	0	0	0	0	0	2	0
Dundee United	Total		16	2	0	0	2	0	0	0	18	2
Den Bosch	2016–17	Eerste Divisie	30	3	1	1	—		—		31	4
Emmen	2017–18	Eerste Divisie	16	2	0	0	—		4	0	20	2
RKC Waalwijk	2018–19	Eerste Divisie	15	7	1	0	—		5	3	21	10
RKC Waalwijk	2019–20	Eredivisie	17	0	0	0	—		—		17	0
RKC Waalwijk	Total		32	7	1	0	—		5	3	38	10
NAC Breda	2020–21	Eerste Divisie	26	9	0	0	—		2	0	28	9
NAC Breda	2021–22	Eerste Divisie	8	0	0	0	—		2	0	10	0
NAC Breda	Total		34	9	0	0	—		4	0	38	9
ADO Den Haag	2022–23	Eerste Divisie	22	2	2	1	—		—		24	3
Kozakken Boys	2023–24	Tweede Divisie	20	6	0	0	—		2	0	10	3
Career total			247	48	7	2	2	0	24	4	280	54
