= Scott Smith (footballer, born 1995) =

Scottish footballer

Personal information
- Date of birth: 21 July 1995 (age 31)
- Place of birth: Perth, Scotland
- Position: Midfielder

Team information
- Current team: Jeanfield Swifts

Youth career
- Longforgan Boys Club
- Dundee United

Senior career*
Years	Team	Apps	(Gls)
2011–2016	Dundee United	5	(0)
2014–2015	→ Forfar Athletic (loan)	8	(0)
2015–2016	→ Airdrieonians (loan)	9	(0)
2016	Forfar Athletic	6	(0)
2016–2018	Elgin City	31	(0)
2018	Broughty Athletic		
2018–	Jeanfield Swifts		

International career
2013	Scotland U18	1	(0)
- * Club domestic league appearances and goals as of 12:44, 5 April 2020 (UTC)

Scott Smith (born 21 July 1995) is a Scottish footballer who plays as a midfielder for Jeanfield Swifts in the East of Scotland Football League. Smith began his career with Dundee United and has also played for Forfar Athletic, Airdrieonians, Elgin City and Broughty Athletic. He also plays futsal for PYF Saltires and represents the Scotland national futsal team.

== Early life and career ==
Smith was born in Perth and played for Longforgan Boys Club with future teammate Scott Fraser, before joining the Dundee United youth system. Youth coach Ian Cathro rated him as highly as Dundee United's most promising talents Ryan Gauld and John Souttar. He continued to impress and went on to sign a professional contract in June 2011.

== Playing career ==
Smith made his first team debut as a late substitute against Heart of Midlothian in March 2014. Soon after, he signed a contract extension to keep him at the club until 2016 and again made a late appearance for the first team against Aberdeen.

On 6 November 2014, Smith joined Forfar Athletic on loan until January 2015. He made his debut on 8 November 2014, in a 2–0 defeat against Greenock Morton.

On 26 August 2015, Smith signed on loan for Airdrieonians until January 2016. After returning from Airdrie, Smith was released by Dundee United in February 2016. In March 2016, Smith returned to Forfar Athletic, signing a short-term contract. He left Forfar at the end of the 2015–16 season, signing for Elgin City in July 2016.

Smith left Elgin in 2018 and joined Dundee-based junior football club Broughty Athletic, where he played alongside his brother Fraser. Both brothers then transferred to East of Scotland League club Jeanfield Swifts in November that year.

Smith also plays futsal for Perth-based PYF Saltires, with whom he won the Scottish Super League in 2019. He represents the Scotland national futsal team, having been called up for the 2017 Home Nations Championship.

== Career statistics ==
As of match played 28 April 2018

Appearances and goals by club, season and competition
Club	Season	League			Cup		League Cup		Other		Total	
Club	Season	Division	Apps	Goals	Apps	Goals	Apps	Goals	Apps	Goals	Apps	Goals
Dundee United	2013–14	Scottish Premiership	2	0	0	0	0	0	0	0	2	0
Dundee United	2014–15	Scottish Premiership	3	0	0	0	1	0	0	0	4	0
Dundee United	2015–16	Scottish Premiership	0	0	0	0	0	0	0	0	0	0
Dundee United	Total		5	0	0	0	1	0	0	0	6	0
Forfar Athletic (loan)	2014–15	Scottish League One	8	1	0	0	0	0	0	0	8	1
Airdrieonians (loan)	2015–16	Scottish League One	9	0	0	0	1	0	0	0	10	0
Forfar Athletic	2015–16	Scottish League One	6	0	0	0	0	0	0	0	6	0
Elgin City	2016–17	Scottish League Two	6	0	0	0	3	0	0	0	9	0
Elgin City	2017–18	Scottish League Two	25	0	0	0	3	0	3 (Note: Appearances in the Scottish Challenge Cup)	0	31	0
Elgin City	Total		31	0	0	0	6	0	3	0	40	0
Career total			58	1	0	0	8	0	3	0	70	1
