= Ryan Dow =

Scottish footballer (born 1991)

Personal information
- Date of birth: 7 June 1991 (age 35)
- Place of birth: Dundee, Scotland
- Positions: Midfielder; forward

Team information
- Current team: Arbroath
- Number: 11

Youth career
- Dundee
- 2005–2007: Dundee United

Senior career*
Years	Team	Apps	(Gls)
2007–2016	Dundee United	93	(8)
2011	→ Forfar Athletic (loan)	11	(3)
2016–2019	Ross County	43	(1)
2018–2019	→ Peterhead (loan)	12	(3)
2019	Peterhead	18	(2)
2019–2022	Dunfermline Athletic	65	(9)
2022	Peterhead	15	(0)
2023–	Arbroath	102	(12)
- * Club domestic league appearances and goals as of 4 May 2026

Ryan Dow (born 7 June 1991) is a Scottish footballer who plays as a midfielder or forward for Scottish Championship club Arbroath.

A product of the Dundee United youth system, he turned professional in 2007. After making his first team debut in 2011, he went on to become a first team regular after a spell on loan to Forfar Athletic. He left Dundee United in the 2016 close season and signed for Ross County in September. Dow moved to Peterhead during the 2018–19 season, initially on loan. In May 2019 he signed for Dunfermline Athletic.

== Early life ==
Ryan Dow was born in Dundee on 7 June 1991. He attended Harris Academy in the city, and was part of the school football team that won the Scottish Schools' Shield in 2005. having previously been attached to Dundee as a youth player, Dow joined Dundee United in 2005, going on to sign a professional contract in June 2007. He also went on and won the Scottish cup with Dundee United in 2010.

== Playing career ==
=== Dundee United ===
Dow's first involvement with the Dundee United first team came in July 2007, when he appeared as a substitute in a pre-season friendly against Airdrie United. Over the next three years he established himself in the Dundee United youth and reserve sides, and was top scorer for the under-19 team in season 2008–09. It was announced in July 2009 that Dow would be joining Forfar Athletic on loan, but the move was never completed.

Dow made his competitive debut for the Dundee United first team on 1 May 2010, at home to Rangers. After coming on as an early substitute, he set up United's goal in the 2–1 defeat. Dow was named man of the match and, shortly afterwards, he signed a contract extension until 2012.

Dow was named in 12 matchday squads during the 2010–11 season, but made only one substitute appearance, against St Mirren in November 2010. He was loaned out to Forfar Athletic in March 2011 for the remainder of the season, to gain experience. He made twelve appearances for the Second Division club, scoring three goals and helping them reach the promotion play-offs. Dow later described his time at Forfar as "a great experience... It does toughen you up when you go down to the lower leagues".

Over the next two seasons, Dow began to feature more regularly in the Dundee United squad. He scored his first goal for the club on 20 September 2011, when he opened the scoring in a Scottish League Cup tie against Airdrie United. He signed an extended contract in October 2011, keeping him at Dundee United until 2014. His first league goal came on 11 May 2013, in a 2–1 win over Inverness Caledonian Thistle.

Dow began to play more regularly after Jackie McNamara became Dundee United manager in 2013. He was selected to start in the first match of the 2013–14 season, ahead of more established players like Gary Mackay-Steven. As the season progressed, Dow was often selected in the middle of a front three formation, despite strong competition for the attacking positions in the team. He later had an extended run in the first team and scored his first goal of the season, in a 3–1 win over Motherwell on 21 February 2014. His second goal came on 26 March 2014, as Dundee United beat Inverness 2–1. Then, on 26 April 2014, Dow scored his third goal of the season in a 5–1 win over Motherwell. On 13 May 2014, Dow signed a new contract until 2016, ending three months of negotiations. A few days after signing his new deal, Dow started in the Scottish Cup Final, as Dundee United lost 2–0 to St Johnstone.

Dow was released by Dundee United at the end of the 2015–16 season, with the club having been relegated to the Scottish Championship.

=== Ross County ===
Dow signed for Ross County on 9 September 2016, having recovered from injury. He extended his contract with Ross County for a further two years in May 2017. Dow left Ross County on 3 January 2019, by mutual consent having made 54 appearances for the club scoring only 1 goal.

=== Peterhead ===
On 14 September 2018, Dow joined Scottish League Two side Peterhead on loan until January 2019. On 3 January 2019, he left Ross County and joined Peterhead on a free transfer.

=== Dunfermline Athletic ===
Following a successful spell with Peterhead, it was announced on 14 May 2019, that Dow had signed a one-year deal with Scottish Championship club Dunfermline Athletic. He scored his first goal for the club in a 3–2 win away to Scottish Premiership side St Mirren in the group stage of the League Cup. Dow was released at the end of the 2021/2022 season following the team's relegation to League One.

== Career statistics ==
As of 27 May 2022

Appearances and goals by club, season and competition
Club	Season	League			Scottish Cup		League Cup		Other		Total	
Club	Season	Division	Apps	Goals	Apps	Goals	Apps	Goals	Apps	Goals	Apps	Goals
Dundee United	2009–10	Scottish Premier League	2	0	0	0	0	0	—		2	0
Dundee United	2010–11	Scottish Premier League	1	0	0	0	0	0	0	0	1	0
Dundee United	2011–12	Scottish Premier League	10	0	0	0	1	1	0	0	11	1
Dundee United	2012–13	Scottish Premier League	12	1	1	0	0	0	1 (Note: Appearance in the Europa League)	0	14	1
Dundee United	2013–14	Scottish Premiership	26	3	4	0	1	1	—		31	4
Dundee United	2014–15	Scottish Premiership	24	2	4	2	4	1	—		32	5
Dundee United	2015–16	Scottish Premiership	18	2	3	0	0	0	—		21	2
Dundee United	Total		93	8	12	2	6	3	1	0	112	13
Forfar Athletic (loan)	2010–11	Scottish Second Division	11	3	0	0	0	0	1 (Note: Appearance in the First Division play-offs)	0	12	3
Ross County	2016–17	Scottish Premiership	23	1	1	0	0	0	—		24	1
Ross County	2017–18	Scottish Premiership	18	0	0	0	5	0	—		23	0
Ross County	2018–19	Scottish Championship	2	0	0	0	4	0	1 (Note: Appearance in the Scottish Challenge Cup)	0	7	0
Ross County	Total		43	1	1	0	9	0	1	0	54	4
Peterhead (loan)	2018–19	Scottish League Two	12	3	2	0	0	0	0	0	14	3
Peterhead	2018–19	Scottish League Two	18	2	0	0	0	0	0	0	18	2
Peterhead	Total		30	5	2	0	0	0	0	0	32	5
Dunfermline Athletic	2019–20	Scottish Championship	22	5	1	0	5	1	0	0	28	6
Dunfermline Athletic	2020–21	Scottish Championship	13	2	0	0	6	1	0	0	19	3
Dunfermline Athletic	2021–22	Scottish Championship	30	2	1	0	1	0	2 (Note: Appearances in the Scottish Championship play-offs)	0	34	2
Dunfermline Athletic	Total		65	9	2	0	12	2	2	0	81	11
Peterhead	2022–23	Scottish League One	15	0	0	0	3	0	0	0	18	0
Arbroath	2022–23	Scottish Championship	0	0	0	0	—		0	0	0	0
Career total			257	26	17	2	27	5	5	0	309	33

== Honours ==
Peterhead

- Scottish League Two: 2018-19
