= Justin Johnson (footballer) =

Dutch footballer

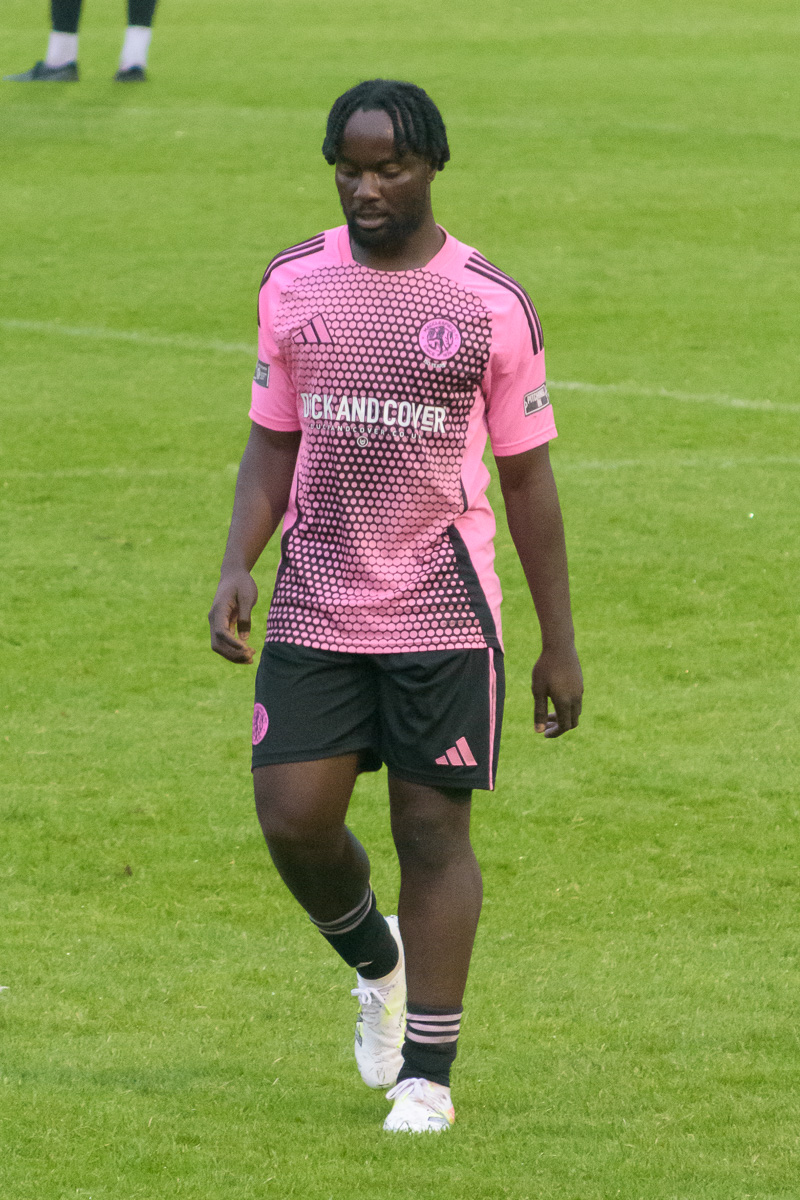
- Johnson playing for Macclesfield in 2025

Personal information
- Full name: Justin Addo Johnson
- Date of birth: 27 August 1996 (age 30)
- Place of birth: The Hague, Netherlands
- Height: 5 ft 7 in (1.70 m)
- Position: Winger

Team information
- Current team: Macclesfield

Youth career
- Sparta Rotterdam
- Manchester United
- F.C. United of Manchester

Senior career*
Years	Team	Apps	(Gls)
2015–2017	Dundee United	5	(1)
2016–2017	→ York City (loan)	5	(0)
2018–2020	Othellos Athienou	21	(4)
2019–2020	→ Akritas Chlorakas (loan)	15	(1)
2020–2021	Hamilton Academical	5	(0)
2021	Greenock Morton	2	(0)
2021–2022	Stalybridge Celtic	29	(8)
2022–2024	Chorley	78	(14)
2024–	Macclesfield	34	(5)
- * Club domestic league appearances and goals as of 13:58, 27 April 2025 (UTC)

Justin Addo Johnson (born 27 August 1996) is a Dutch professional footballer who plays as a winger for Macclesfield. His previous clubs are Dundee United and Hamilton Academical in Scotland, York City in England and Othellos Athienou and Akritas Chlorakas in Cyprus.

== Early life ==
Johnson was born in The Hague, South Holland, and started his career as a youth player with Sparta Rotterdam. After moving to England, he joined the Manchester United Academy, but was released and joined the football academy at the Manchester College. From there, he joined the youth squad of non-League club F.C. United of Manchester.

== Career ==
After leaving F.C. United, Johnson joined Dundee United's development squad as an amateur player in March 2015. He signed a three-year professional contract in May 2015 and made his first-team debut as a substitute two days later, in a Scottish Premiership match against Inverness Caledonian Thistle. Dundee United manager Jackie McNamara described Johnson as a "crowd pleaser" with "great potential".

On 1 September 2016, Johnson was loaned to National League club York City, managed by McNamara, for the rest of the 2016–17 season. On 31 January 2017, his loan to York and his Dundee United contract were both cancelled by mutual consent.

Johnson was without a club in the 2017–18 season before joining Othellos Athienou in the Cypriot Second Division for 2018–19. The following season he joined Akritas Chlorakas on a season long loan.

On 4 August 2020, Johnson made a return to Scottish football, signing for Premiership club Hamilton Academical. Along with teammate Tunde Owolabi, he was released by mutual consent in February 2021.

Later that month, Johnson signed a contract with Greenock Morton of the Scottish Championship until the end of the 2020–21 season. He made his debut for Morton from the bench in a defeat against Ayr United. He left Morton in June 2021 when his contract expired.

In September 2021, Johnson joined Stalybridge Celtic. He made his debut in a league match against Gainsborough Trinity on 18 September.

Johnson signed for National League North side Chorley in July 2022 after impressing in pre-season matches.

On 24 May 2024 Johnson signed for Northern Premier League side Macclesfield after being named in the 2023-24 National League North Team of the Season.

== Career statistics ==
As of the end of the 2024–25 season

Appearances and goals by club, season and competition
Club	Season	League			National Cup		League Cup		Other		Total	
Club	Season	Division	Apps	Goals	Apps	Goals	Apps	Goals	Apps	Goals	Apps	Goals
Dundee United	2014–15	Scottish Premiership	1	0	0	0	0	0	—		1	0
Dundee United	2015–16	Scottish Premiership	3	1	0	0	0	0	—		3	1
Dundee United	2016–17	Scottish Championship	1	0	—		1	0	—		2	0
Dundee United	Total		5	1	0	0	1	0	0	0	6	1
York City (loan)	2016–17	National League	5	0	0	0	—		0	0	5	0
Othellos Atheniou	2018–19	Cypriot Second Division	21	4	0	0	—		0	0	21	4
Akritas Chlorakas (loan)	2019–20	Cypriot Second Division	15	1	1	0	—		0	0	16	1
Hamilton Academical	2020–21	Scottish Premiership	5	0	0	0	2	0	—		7	0
Greenock Morton	2020–21	Scottish Championship	2	0	0	0	0	0	—		2	0
Stalybridge Celtic	2021–22	NPL Premier Division	29	8	0	0	—		5 (Note: 2 appearances (3 goals) in the FA Trophy, 3 appearances (1 goal) in the Cheshire Senior Cup)	4	34	12
Chorley	2022–23	National League North	33	0	2	0	—		2 (Note: Appearances in the FA Trophy)	0	37	0
Chorley	2023–24	National League North	45	14	3	0	—		5 (Note: 3 appearances in the FA Trophy, 2 appearances in National League North play-offs)	0	53	14
Chorley	Total		78	14	5	0	—		7	0	90	14
Macclesfield	2024–25	NPL Premier Division	34	5	4	2	—		4	1	42	8
Career total			194	33	10	2	3	0	16	5	223	40
