= Scott Fraser (footballer, born 1995) =

Scottish footballer

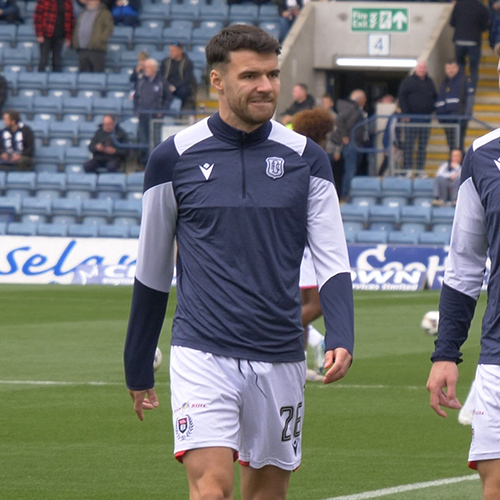
- Fraser during a Dundee warm-up in 2024

Personal information
- Full name: Scott Stewart Fraser
- Date of birth: 30 March 1995 (age 31)
- Place of birth: Dundee, Scotland
- Position: Midfielder

Youth career
- 2005–2014: Dundee United

Senior career*
Years	Team	Apps	(Gls)
2014–2018	Dundee United	81	(9)
2014–2015	→ Airdrieonians (loan)	28	(5)
2018–2020	Burton Albion	72	(11)
2020–2021	Milton Keynes Dons	44	(14)
2021–2022	Ipswich Town	15	(1)
2022–2024	Charlton Athletic	67	(9)
2024	→ Heart of Midlothian (loan)	11	(0)
2024–2025	Dundee	5	(0)
2025–2026	Ross County	13	(1)
2026	Brechin City	9	(0)
- * Club domestic league appearances and goals as of 20:58, 7 June 2026 (UTC)

Scott Stewart Fraser (born 30 March 1995) is a Scottish professional footballer who plays as a midfielder.

He has previously played for Dundee United, Airdrieonians, Burton Albion, Milton Keynes Dons, Ipswich Town, Charlton Athletic, Heart of Midlothian, Dundee, Ross County and Brechin City.

== Early life ==
Fraser first started playing competitive football with local boys side Dee Club before moving onto Longforgan Boys Club, along with future teammate Scott Smith. At age 10 he then joined the youth set-up at Dundee United.

== Club career ==
=== Dundee United ===
He progressed through the youth ranks and joined up with the first team for pre-season at the start of the 2011–12 season, but suffered a leg break which kept him out of action for the entire season. After recovering from injury, Fraser was named as Dundee United's U20 Player of the Year for the 2013–14 season. He made his first team debut on 11 May 2014 as a substitute in the final game of the Scottish Premiership season, away to Celtic.

Fraser made his first start for Dundee United on 8 August 2015, in a 2–0 Premiership win at Motherwell. A season later, he played a key role in the Dundee United team that went on to win the 2016–17 Scottish Challenge Cup, playing in three rounds and scoring in the 3–2 semi-final away win over Queen of the South.

He was named the Scottish Championship Player of the Month for November 2017. After three seasons in the United first team, Fraser decided to leave the club in May 2018.

==== Airdrieonians (loan) ====
On 10 October 2014, Fraser signed for Airdrieonians on loan until January 2015, later extended until May 2015. He scored a goal after two minutes of his Airdrie debut, in a 4–0 win against Brechin City.

=== Burton Albion ===
On 5 July 2018, Fraser signed a two-year deal with English League One club Burton Albion. He made his debut on 4 August 2018 in a 2–1 home defeat to Rochdale, and scored his first goal for the club on 8 September 2018 in a 1–1 draw away to Accrington Stanley. During the 2018–19 season, Fraser was a key part of the Burton Albion squad that reached the semi-finals of the EFL Cup.

On 20 August 2019, Fraser scored a second half hat-trick within 23 minutes in a 4–2 win away to Oxford United. He finished the 2019–20 season with 11 assists – the second highest total in League One for that campaign. Fraser left Burton Albion on 1 July 2020 following the expiry of his contract having declined a new deal.

=== Milton Keynes Dons ===
On 9 September 2020, Fraser signed a two-year contract with fellow League One club Milton Keynes Dons. He made his debut on 19 September 2020 in a 2–1 home league defeat to Lincoln City, and scored his first goal for the club on 10 October 2020 in a 2–1 away league defeat to Portsmouth. Following a successful year in which he scored a career-best 14 goals in 50 appearances, Fraser was named MK Dons Players' Player of the Year for the 2020–21 season.

=== Ipswich Town ===
On 14 July 2021, Fraser signed for Ipswich Town for an undisclosed fee, signing a three-year contract. He made his debut for the club on 7 August 2021, where he scored the first of Ipswich's two goals in a 2–2 opening day draw with Morecambe.

=== Charlton Athletic ===
On 31 January 2022, Fraser joined League One club Charlton Athletic for an undisclosed fee, signing a contract until 2025.

On 31 August 2024, it was confirmed that Fraser had left the club by mutual consent.

==== Heart of Midlothian (loan) ====
On 31 January 2024, Fraser joined Heart of Midlothian on loan for the rest of the 2023–24 season.

=== Dundee ===
On 20 September 2024, Fraser joined Scottish Premiership club Dundee on a one-year deal. Fraser made his debut on 28 September as a substitute in a league game at home to Aberdeen. In October, Fraser suffered a groin injury against Motherwell which kept him out for 6 months after various subsequent setbacks. On 26 April 2025, Fraser returned to pitch for Dundee in an away victory over his former club Heart of Midlothian. On 17 June 2025, Dundee announced that Fraser had departed the club.

=== Ross County ===
On 12 September 2025, Fraser signed for Scottish Championship club Ross County on a one-year deal, reuniting with previous manager Tony Docherty.

== Career statistics ==
As of 4 April 2026

Appearances and goals by club, season and competition
Club	Season	League			National cup (Note: Includes Scottish Cup, FA Cup)		League cup (Note: Includes Scottish League Cup, EFL Cup)		Other		Total	
Club	Season	Division	Apps	Goals	Apps	Goals	Apps	Goals	Apps	Goals	Apps	Goals
Dundee United	2013–14	Scottish Premiership	1	0	0	0	0	0	–		1	0
Dundee United	2014–15	Scottish Premiership	0	0	0	0	0	0	–		0	0
Dundee United	2015–16	Scottish Premiership	32	1	2	1	2	1	–		36	3
Dundee United	2016–17	Scottish Championship	25	4	1	0	5	1	6 (Note: Three appearances and one goal in the Scottish Challenge Cup and three appearances in the Scottish Championship play-offs)	1	37	6
Dundee United	2017–18	Scottish Championship	23	4	0	0	4	1	5 (Note: One appearance in the Scottish Challenge Cup and four appearances and one goal in the Scottish Championship play-offs)	1	32	6
Dundee United	Total		81	9	3	1	11	3	11	2	106	15
Airdrieonians (loan)	2014–15	Scottish League One	28	5	2	0	0	0	0	0	30	5
Burton Albion	2018–19	League One	42	6	1	0	6	1	1 (Note: Appearances in EFL Trophy)	0	50	7
Burton Albion	2019–20	League One	30	5	4	2	4	1	3	1	41	9
Burton Albion	Total		72	11	5	2	10	2	4	1	91	16
Milton Keynes Dons	2020–21	League One	44	14	3	0	0	0	3	0	50	14
Ipswich Town	2021–22	League One	15	1	3	0	1	0	1	0	20	1
Charlton Athletic	2021–22	League One	9	0	–		–		–		9	0
Charlton Athletic	2022–23	League One	42	9	2	0	3	0	0	0	47	9
Charlton Athletic	2023–24	League One	16	0	3	1	0	0	3	0	22	1
Charlton Athletic	Total		67	9	5	1	3	0	3	0	78	10
Heart of Midlothian (loan)	2023–24	Scottish Premiership	11	0	1	0	—		—		12	0
Dundee	2024–25	Scottish Premiership	5	0	0	0	0	0	0	0	5	0
Ross County	2025–26	Scottish Championship	7	1	0	0	0	0	0	0	7	!
Brechin City	2025–26	Highland League	9	0	–		–		0	0	9	0
Career Total			339	50	22	4	25	5	22	3	408	62

== Honours ==
Dundee United

- Scottish Challenge Cup: 2016–17

Individual

- Dundee United U20 Player of the Year: 2013–14
- Scottish Championship Player of the Month: November 2017
- Milton Keynes Dons Players' Player of the Year: 2020–21
