= Darren Petrie =

Scottish footballer

Personal information
- Date of birth: 26 July 1995 (age 31)
- Place of birth: Stirling, Scotland
- Position: Midfielder

Youth career
- Carse Thistle
- Dundee United

Senior career*
Years	Team	Apps	(Gls)
2013–2015	Dundee United	1	(0)
2013–2014	→ Brechin City (loan)	24	(1)
2015	→ Dumbarton (loan)	8	(1)
2015–2016	Raith Rovers	6	(0)
2016	→ Albion Rovers (loan)	7	(0)
2016–2017	Stirling Albion	15	(0)

International career
2011–2012	Scotland U17	6	(0)
2012–2014	Scotland U19	12	(0)
- * Club domestic league appearances and goals

Darren Petrie (born 26 July 1995) is a Scottish former professional footballer who played as a midfielder. Petrie has previously played for Dundee United, Raith Rovers and Stirling Albion, as well as Brechin City, Dumbarton and Albion Rovers on loan.

== Early life ==
Petrie was born in Stirling, where he played youth football for Carse Thistle. He signed his first professional contract with Dundee United in June 2011.

== Career ==
=== Club ===
A member of Dundee United's under–20 side, Petrie aged 17 made his first team debut on 2 January 2013, appearing as a substitute in a 2–2 draw with Aberdeen at Pittodrie Stadium.

On 18 October 2013, Petrie signed for Brechin City on an initial one-month loan. On 4 November 2013, he signed an extension to his United contract, keeping him at the club until May 2015. In January 2014, his loan at Brechin was extended until the end of the season.

On 28 January 2015, Petrie joined Dumbarton on loan. He scored on his debut in a 3–3 draw against Falkirk. Dundee United announced in April 2015 that Petrie's contract would not be renewed and he will be leaving the club when it expires. He left Dumbarton at the end of his loan deal, having scored once in eight appearances.

On 29 May 2015 it was confirmed that Petrie was joining Raith Rovers having been released by Dundee United.

On 5 February 2016 it was confirmed that Petrie had joined Albion Rovers on loan. Petrie subsequently signed for Scottish League Two side Stirling Albion in June 2016, where he spent one season before being released in May 2017.

=== International ===
He has represented Scotland at under-17 and under-19 level, where he made his debut on 23 August 2012, in a 2–1 win over Norway. As of March 2014, he has made 11 appearances for the under-19 side.

== Career statistics ==
As of 29 April 2015

Club statistics
Club	Season	League		League Cup		Scottish Cup		Europe		Other		Total	
Club	Season	App	Goals	App	Goals	App	Goals	App	Goals	App	Goals	App	Goals
Dundee United	2012–13	1	0	0	0	0	0	0	0	0	0	1	0
Dundee United	2013–14	0	0	0	0	0	0	0	0	0	0	0	0
Dundee United	2014–15	0	0	0	0	0	0	0	0	0	0	0	0
Dundee United	Total	1	0	0	0	0	0	0	0	0	0	1	0
Brechin City (loan)	2013–14	24	1	0	0	3	0	0	0	0	0	27	1
Dumbarton (loan)	2014–15	8	1	0	0	0	0	0	0	0	0	8	1
Career Total		33	2	0	0	3	0	0	0	0	0	36	2
