= Nadir Çiftçi =

Turkish footballer (born 1992)

Personal information
- Date of birth: 12 February 1992 (age 34)
- Place of birth: Karakoçan, Turkey
- Height: 1.87 m (6 ft 2 in)
- Position: Forward

Youth career
- 2003: Haaglandia
- 2003–2007: ADO Den Haag
- 2007–2010: Portsmouth

Senior career*
Years	Team	Apps	(Gls)
2010–2011	Portsmouth	19	(1)
2011–2012	Kayserispor	11	(0)
2012–2013	NAC Breda	7	(0)
2013–2015	Dundee United	68	(25)
2015–2018	Celtic	12	(4)
2016	→ Eskişehirspor (loan)	12	(4)
2017	→ Pogoń Szczecin (loan)	8	(0)
2017–2018	→ Plymouth Argyle (loan)	7	(0)
2018	→ Motherwell (loan)	11	(3)
2018–2020	Gençlerbirliği	43	(11)
2020	Çaykur Rizespor	1	(0)
2020–2021	Samsunspor	25	(7)
2021–2022	Ankaragücü	11	(0)
2022	St Johnstone	11	(0)
2022	Makedonikos	4	(0)
2023	İskenderunspor	13	(2)
2023–2024	Karaman FK	15	(4)
2024	İnegölspor	11	(3)
2025–2026	FC Huttenheim		

International career
2008	Netherlands U17	2	(0)
2011	Turkey U19	7	(1)
- * Club domestic league appearances and goals

Nadir Çiftçi (born 12 February 1992) is a Turkish retired footballer who played as a forward. In a nomadic career he has played for Portsmouth, Kayserispor, NAC Breda, Dundee United, Celtic, Eskişehirspor, Pogoń Szczecin, Plymouth Argyle, Motherwell, Gençlerbirliği, Çaykur Rizespor, Samsunspor, Ankaragücü and St Johnstone.

Çiftçi represented the Netherlands under-17 team before switching national allegiance to the country of his birth, Turkey, when he played for their under-19 team.

== Club career ==
=== Portsmouth ===
Çiftçi moved from Dutch side ADO Den Haag to Portsmouth at the start of the 2007–08 Premier League season when he was just 15 years of age for a fee of around £80,000. He signed professional terms in June 2010. After an impressive pre-season tour of the United States, he made his first-team debut on 7 August 2010 as a substitute in a 2–0 defeat against Coventry City. On his first competitive start for Portsmouth, Çiftçi scored his first goal for the club against Stevenage on 9 August 2010 in the first round of the League Cup. This goal proved vital for Portsmouth as they won the match 2–1.

He scored the opener in Portsmouth's first home game against Reading in the 2010–11 Championship season, his second goal in three competitive games. Following the arrival of Liam Lawrence, Çiftçi's playing time became more limited, but manager Steve Cotterill was reluctant to send him out on loan due to the club's lack of squad depth. He finished the season making 22 appearances (17 as substitute) and scoring two goals in all competitions.

=== Kayserispor and NAC Breda ===
On 14 May 2011, Çiftçi turned down the offer of a new contract with Portsmouth and signed with Turkish club Kayserispor. Because of his age, Portsmouth received £100,000 for the transfer. His contract was mutually terminated in June 2012 before trialling at NAC Breda and former club ADO Den Haag.

Following a trial, Çiftçi joined NAC Breda in August 2012 on a three-year contract. After one season, Çiftçi would leave the club.

=== Dundee United ===
On 2 July 2013, Çiftçi went on trial to Scottish Premiership club Dundee United. On 25 July, he joined United on a two-year contract. Two days later, he scored for Dundee United with a stunning strike, in a 1–0 win against Wigan Athletic in a pre-season friendly. Çiftçi said it was his "best goal ever" and his new manager Jackie McNamara commented that the goal showed "why we've signed him" adding "we've all got high hopes for him".

Çiftçi scored his first competitive goals for Dundee United on 28 August 2013 in their 3–2 win in the League Cup second round tie against Dumbarton; he came on as a second-half substitute and quickly equalised before going on to score the winning goal in the dying minutes of the game. On 15 September 2013, Çiftçi scored his first league goal for Dundee United against Ross County. He followed this up seven days later with another goal, against Motherwell. On 5 October 2013, Çiftçi scored a twenty-yard volley low and hard without the ball hitting the ground, which proved to be the winner against Kilmarnock.

On 29 October 2013, Çiftçi was red-carded as Dundee United lost 2–1 against Inverness Caledonian Thistle in the League Cup. On 1 November 2013, with Dundee United having appealed the ordering off, Çiftçi was then accused of grabbing an assistant referee by the throat and grabbing the face of an Inverness player during the same match. On 7 November 2013, the SFA judiciary panel ruled that the charge of grabbing the opponent was unproven and also reduced his red card to a yellow card. On 3 December 2013, Çiftçi was given a two-match suspension by the SFA, with one of those matches suspended until the end of the season. This was after the initial charge of "seizing hold" of the assistant referee "by the throat" was amended to "excessive misconduct at a match by placing an open hand into the lower area of the assistant referee's throat".

He finished the season with eleven goals in the league, helping Dundee United to a fourth-place finish. Çiftçi's four goals in the Scottish Cup during 2014, including Dundee United's third goal in a 3–1 Scottish Cup semi-final victory over Rangers on 10 April 2014, helped United reach the final. However, Dundee United were beaten 2–0 by St Johnstone in the final on 17 May 2014, although Çiftçi came close to scoring early in the second half when he hit the post from a free kick.

He scored the first goal of his second season with Dundee United in a 2–1 home league win over Ross County on 23 August 2014, opening the scoring in the first half with a header from a Paul Paton free kick. His next goal came three weeks later in a 2–2 draw with Hamilton Accies, but was sent off the same game just before half time after receiving two bookings. Çiftçi continued to score regularly for United, and played a pivotal role in his side's 2–1 win league win over Celtic in December 2014. He was booked in the opening minute for a foul on Scott Brown, then opened the scoring four minutes later, taking advantage of Efe Ambrose's fresh-air swipe at a deflected Stuart Armstrong pass, and using his strength and close control to hold off the Celtic defender and fire a shot past Craig Gordon. He then provided the assist for United's second goal, crossing from the right wing to Armstrong who headed past Gordon in goal. Çiftçi finished the season with 16 goals in all competitions, and scored twice in the last game of the season, a 3–0 win over city rivals Dundee. This meant that he was the club's top scorer in both his seasons at Tannadice.

During his time with Dundee United, Çiftçi garnered a reputation for indiscipline; aside from his red cards against Inverness and Hamilton Accies, he was also accused of kicking Celtic's Scott Brown on the head during a bad tempered Scottish Cup tie in March 2015 and then at the end of the season he was cited for "excessive misconduct" after being accused of biting Dundee's Jim McAlister on the leg in May 2015. A disciplinary panel subsequently found him guilty of the offence, giving him an eight-match ban with two suspended.

At the end of the 2014–15 season, he was linked with both Middlesbrough and Celtic. On 7 July 2015 Dundee United confirmed that they had accepted £1.5 million bid from Celtic and had allowed the player to speak to the Glasgow club regarding a transfer.

=== Celtic ===
Celtic confirmed the signing of Çiftçi on 9 July 2015, with the player signing a four-year contract. He chose to wear the number 7, which has previously been worn by club legends Jimmy Johnstone and Henrik Larsson. He made his debut the day after signing, coming on as a substitute in a pre-season friendly against Real Sociedad and providing the assist for Gary Mackay-Steven's goal in a 1–0 win.

Çiftçi started each of Celtic's first four Champions League qualifier games, but failed to score so was dropped to the bench for the first leg of the play-off round against Malmö. He came off the bench at the closing stages, and received a booking near the end of the game. Malmö defender Rasmus Bengtsson criticised Çiftçi after the game, stating that he "was not particularly nice" and that "the first thing he wanted to do when he came on was to talk. He had more focus on that than his performance." Çiftçi missed Celtic's first six league matches of the season due to suspension, but eventually scored his first goal for the club during a 6–0 win over Dundee on 20 September 2015, having also provided an assist for Scott Brown's goal in the game.

Çiftçi was chosen by manager Ronny Deila to start in the Scottish Premiership match against St Johnstone on 13 December 2015, in place of the injured Leigh Griffiths. He scored two goals as Celtic won 3–0.

==== Eskişehirspor (loan) ====
By the end of January 2016, Çiftçi had only scored four goals in 22 matches, albeit most of his appearances were from the substitutes bench. On 1 February 2016, it was reported that Celtic had lined up a loan move for Çiftçi for the rest of the season to Turkish club Eskişehirspor. The loan deal was confirmed by Deila the following day during a press conference, with the Celtic manager stating that "Nadir was very keen to get out and play consistently" and adding "He's a young player and we felt it was a good idea and he will be back again in the summer."

Çiftçi made his debut for the Turkish club on 7 February 2016 in a Süper Lig match away at Çaykur Rizespor. However, he only lasted 34 minutes before being substituted for Vladyslav Kulach in a tactical switch. He was sent off in his next match a week later, a league match at home against Antalyaspor, after picking up two yellow cards in the space of a minute. Çiftçi returned to the side on 13 March and scored his first goal for the club; running past two challenges before playing a one-two and shooting in a low drive for the opening goal in a 3–3 draw with Akhisar Belediyespor. The game ended in a mass brawl between the opposing sides, with Çiftçi seen to argue with Bruno Mezenga amongst the on-field chaos.

==== Pogoń Szczecin (loan) ====
On 16 February 2017, Ciftci joined Polish club Pogoń Szczecin on a loan deal until the end of the season. He had a disappointing spell there, criticised by the local media for appearing unfit and told by the club's manager he needed to improve. In the start of June 2017, Ciftci suffered an ankle injury and was sent back home to Celtic, having failed to net a single goal in eight appearances.

==== Plymouth Argyle (loan) ====
Çiftçi signed for EFL League One club Plymouth Argyle on 21 August 2017, on a season-long loan deal. His time at Plymouth was not a success; he made only six starts and two substitute appearances, and failed to score a goal. By January 2018, it was being reported that Çiftçi was likely to leave Plymouth during the transfer window.

==== Motherwell (loan) ====
On 9 January 2018, with his loan at Plymouth having been ended early, Çiftçi signed for Motherwell, again on loan until the end of the season. He made his debut for Motherwell on 20 January 2018, in a 2–0 win against Hamilton Academical in the Scottish Cup. He scored his first goal for the club on 3 February in a 1–1 draw at home against Partick Thistle.

At the end of the 2017–18 season, Celtic confirmed that Çiftçi would leave the club on 30 June.

=== Gençlerbirliği ===
Çiftçi made his competitive debut for Gençlerbirliği on their opening league fixture of the season on 12 August 2018, coming on as a substitute on 81 minutes in a 1–0 win over Hatayspor. He helped his new club make a strong start to the season, winning their first nine league games, with Çiftçi scoring four goals.

=== Çaykur Rizespor ===
Çiftçi signed a two-year deal with Çaykur Rizespor on 24 August 2020.

=== Samsunspor ===
After just a month long stint at Çaykur Rizespor, Çiftçi signed a two-year deal with the TFF First League club Samsunspor.

=== MKE Ankaragücü ===
In September 2021, Çiftçi signed with MKE Ankaragücü, and was released in January 2022.

=== St Johnstone ===
On 5 January 2022, Çiftçi returned to Scotland after signing with Scottish Premiership side St Johnstone until the end of the season.

== International career ==
Although Çiftçi has represented the Netherlands at youth level, he has chosen to play for Turkey. In November 2010, Turkey national team coach Guus Hiddink met Çiftçi to persuade him to switch his national allegiance to Turkey, and subsequently received a call-up after Çiftçi announced his desire to play for the country.

On 8 March 2011, Çiftçi made his debut for Turkey, at under-19 level, in the match against Montenegro. This game ended 3–0. Two days later, he scored his first goal for under-19, in the match against Montenegro. This game ended 3–3. On 2 July 2013, Pierre van Hooijdonk revealed that Çiftçi was about to make his senior Turkey debut but his passport application fell through, causing him to miss out on a first international cap at senior level.

== Career statistics ==
As of 26 February 2022

Appearances and goals by club, season and competition
Club	Season	League			National cup		League cup		Other		Total	
Club	Season	Division	Apps	Goals	Apps	Goals	Apps	Goals	Apps	Goals	Apps	Goals
Portsmouth	2009–10	Premier League	0	0	0	0	0	0	–		0	0
Portsmouth	2010–11	Championship	19	1	1	0	2	1	–		22	2
Portsmouth	Total		19	1	1	0	2	1	–		22	2
Kayserispor	2011–12	Süper Lig	11	0	1	0	–		–		12	0
NAC Breda	2012–13	Eredivisie	7	0	0	0	–		–		7	0
Dundee United	2013–14	Scottish Premiership	32	11	5	4	3	2	–		40	17
Dundee United	2014–15	Scottish Premiership	36	14	3	1	3	1	–		42	16
Dundee United	Total		68	25	8	5	6	3	–		82	33
Celtic	2015–16	Scottish Premiership	11	4	0	0	2	0	9 (Note: Six appearances in the Champions League and three in the Europa League)	0	22	4
Celtic	2016–17	Scottish Premiership	1	0	1	0	0	0	2 (Note: Appearances in the Champions League)	0	4	0
Celtic	2017–18	Scottish Premiership	0	0	0	0	0	0	0	0	0	0
Celtic	Total		12	4	1	0	2	0	11	0	26	4
Eskişehirspor (loan)	2015–16	Süper Lig	12	4	0	0	–		–		12	4
Pogoń Szczecin (loan)	2016–17	Ekstraklasa	8	0	2	0	–		–		10	0
Plymouth Argyle (loan)	2017–18	League One	7	0	0	0	0	0	1 (Note: Appearance in the EFL Trophy)	0	8	0
Motherwell (loan)	2017–18	Scottish Premiership	11	3	4	0	0	0	–		15	3
Gençlerbirliği	2018–19	TFF First League	30	11	1	1	0	0	–		31	12
Gençlerbirliği	2019–20	Süper Lig	13	0	1	0	0	0	–		14	0
Gençlerbirliği	Total		43	11	2	1	0	0	–		45	12
Çaykur Rizespor	2020–21	Süper Lig	1	0	0	0	0	0	–		1	0
Samsunspor	2020–21	TFF First League	25	7	1	0	0	0	2	1	28	8
Ankaragücü	2021–22	TFF First League	11	0	1	0	0	0	0	0	12	0
St Johnstone	2021–22	Scottish Premiership	4	0	1	0	0	0	0	0	5	0
Career total			233	55	22	6	10	4	13	1	278	66

== Honours ==
Celtic

- Scottish Premiership: 2015–16
