= Ola Adeyemo =

Nigerian footballer (born 1995)

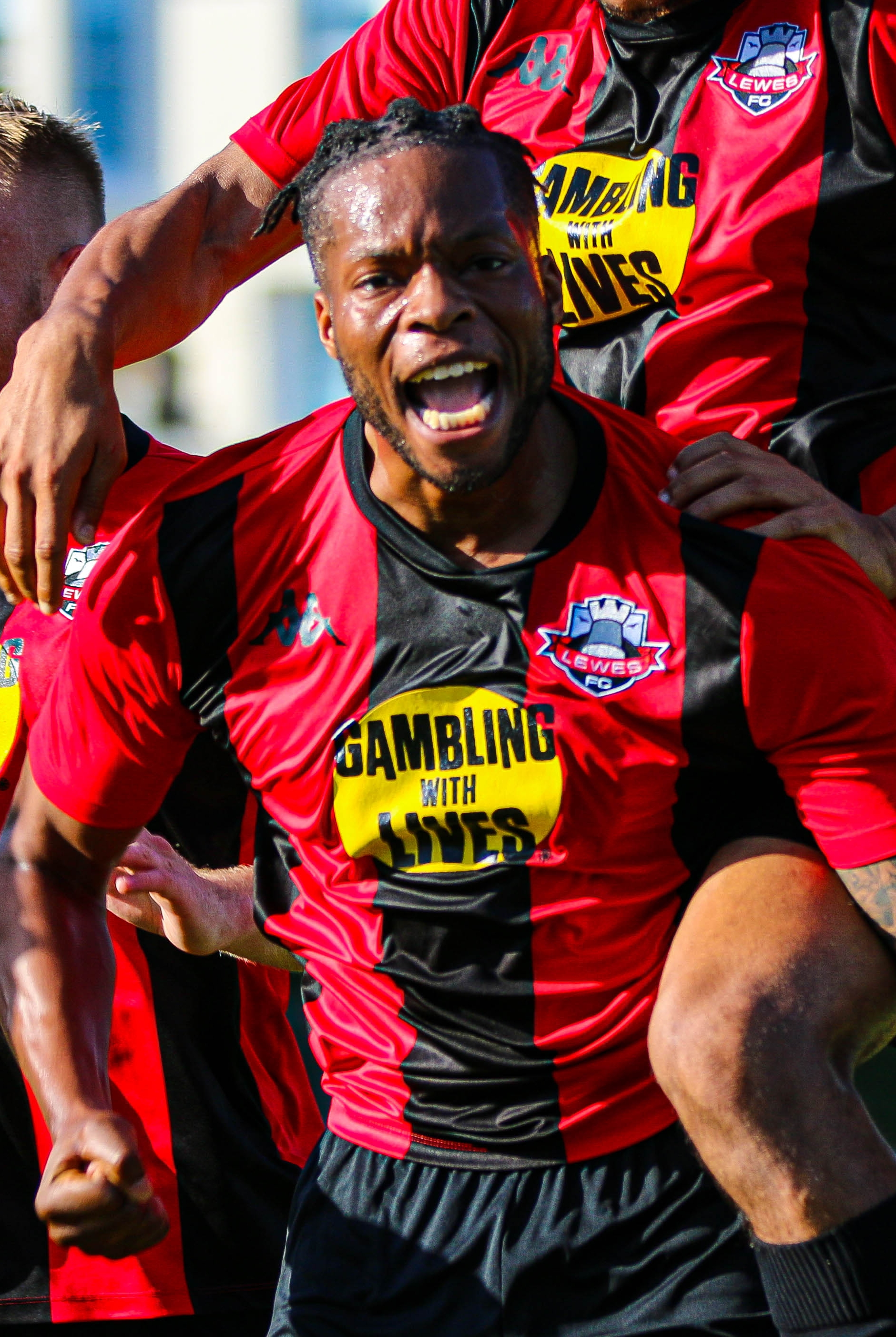
- Adeyemo celebrating a goal scored for Lewes in September 2019

Personal information
- Full name: Olajuwon Bamidele Adeyemo
- Date of birth: 13 February 1995 (age 31)
- Place of birth: Nigeria
- Height: 6 ft 0 in (1.83 m)
- Position: Striker

Youth career
- Stella Maris
- 2012: St Patrick's Athletic
- 2012–2013: UCD

Senior career*
Years	Team	Apps	(Gls)
2013	UCD	0	(0)
2014–2015	Dundee United	1	(0)
2015	→ East Fife (loan)	11	(0)
2016–2017	Watford	0	(0)
2017–2018	Valdres FK	12	(7)
2019	Walton Casuals	2	(0)
2019	Lewes	21	(4)
2020	Wexford	4	(0)
2021–2022	Cove Rangers	11	(1)
2022	Peterhead	4	(1)
2023	Newry City	13	(1)
2023	Longford Town	9	(0)
- * Club domestic league appearances and goals as of 21 October 2023

Olajuwon Bamidele Adeyemo (born 13 February 1995) is a Nigerian footballer who plays as a striker.

Born in Nigeria, Adeyemo moved to London, England as a baby and then to Dublin, Ireland at the age of two. He later went on to play youth football with Stella Maris and St Patrick's Athletic, and was part of the Football Association of Ireland's national youth development programme.

== Playing career ==
=== Club ===
Adeyemo joined UCD from St Patrick's Athletic, where he went on to make his first senior appearance. He joined Scottish Premiership club Dundee United in June 2014 after a spell on trial with Leyton Orient. After making his debut for Dundee United as a substitute in a Premiership match at Kilmarnock on 3 October 2014, Adeyemo signed a contract extension in December 2014 to keep him at the club for a further eighteen months. In February 2015, he joined East Fife in Scottish League Two on a development loan for the rest of the 2014–15 season. Adeyemo left Dundee United in December 2015 after his contract was cancelled by mutual agreement, having made only two substitute appearances for the first team. Adeyemo signed for English Premier League club Watford on 30 March 2016 until 2017 after a successful trial with the club's Under-21s. He was released by Watford at the end of the 2016–17 season and in July 2017 signed for Norwegian 3. divisjon side Valdres FK. Having left Valdres after the 2017 season, Adeyemo had a trial with Scottish Championship club Falkirk in November 2018. He signed for non-league Southern Premier side Walton Casuals in January 2019. Adeyemo transferred to Isthmian League Premier Division club Lewes in February 2019. On 30 July 2020, it was announced that Adeyemo has returned to Ireland, signing for League of Ireland First Division side Wexford.

Adeyemo signed for Scottish League One side Cove Rangers on 9 September 2021. He was let go at the end of the 2021-22 season and subsequently signed for Peterhead. He scored one goal in four appearances for the club before being released in December 2022.

Adeyemo was announced as a Newry City AFC player in January 2023. He made his debut as a substitute, coming on in a scoreless draw at home to Larne.

On 23 July 2023, it was announced that Adeyemo had signed for League of Ireland First Division club Longford Town, where he would play alongside his younger brother Jordan for the first time. He made his debut the same day, coming off the bench in a 2–1 loss at home to St Patrick's Athletic in the first round of the 2023 FAI Cup. Adeyemo was released at the end of the season.

=== International ===
Adeyemo, who is also qualified to represent England or the Republic of Ireland, received a call-up to a Nigeria under-23 squad training camp in January 2015.
