= Jarosław Fojut =

Polish footballer

Personal information
- Full name: Jarosław Fojut
- Date of birth: 17 October 1987 (age 39)
- Place of birth: Legionowo, Poland
- Height: 1.88 m (6 ft 2 in)
- Position: Centre-back

Team information
- Current team: Stal Rzeszów (sporting director)

Youth career
- Legionovia Legionowo
- Darzbór Szczecinek
- –2004: MSP Szamotuły

Senior career*
Years	Team	Apps	(Gls)
2004–2009	Bolton Wanderers	1	(0)
2007–2008	→ Luton Town (loan)	16	(2)
2008	→ Stockport County (loan)	3	(0)
2009–2012	Śląsk Wrocław	58	(2)
2013–2014	Tromsø	27	(2)
2014–2015	Dundee United	36	(4)
2015–2019	Pogoń Szczecin	88	(4)
2019–2020	Wisła Płock	3	(0)
2020–2021	Stal Rzeszów	10	(1)
Total		242	(15)

International career
2006	Poland U19		
2007	Poland U20		
2010	Poland U23	1	(0)
- * Club domestic league appearances and goals

Jarosław Fojut (born 17 October 1987) is a Polish former professional footballer who played as a centre-back. He currently serves as the sporting director of Stal Rzeszów.

Fojut began his career in England, where he played for Bolton Wanderers and also spent time on loan with Luton Town and Stockport County. He subsequently returned to Poland with Śląsk Wrocław and also played for Tromsø IL in Norway and Dundee United in Scotland prior to joining Pogoń Szczecin in 2015. He has also competed at youth international level up to the Poland under-23 team.

== Club career ==
=== Bolton ===
Fojut was born in Legionowo, Masovian Voivodeship. He joined Bolton Wanderers in 2004. The defender made his first senior appearance for Bolton as a substitute (to replace Khalilou Fadiga), during the FA Cup Third Round 3–0 victory against Watford at Vicarage Road in 2006. His Premier League debut came in the 1–1 draw against Portsmouth at Fratton Park. He made a total of four appearances for the first team, as well as becoming captain of the reserve team.

=== Luton (loan) ===
On 31 August 2007, he joined League One side Luton Town on loan until 1 January 2008. He made his debut for Luton in the Football League Trophy match against Northampton Town on 4 September. He scored his first goal on 27 November in a 2–0 away win against Brentford in the FA Cup and followed that up a week later with his first league goal in a 1–1 tie away to Oldham Athletic. He scored his third and final goal for Luton in a 2–1 win over Port Vale on 29 December 2007.

Fojut garnered much praise during his loan spell, Luton manager Kevin Blackwell describing the young defender's performances as "colossal", however, his stay could not be extended, with all loan players being required to return to their parent clubs when Luton was placed in administration.

He returned to Bolton Wanderers and over the summer underwent an operation to resolve a long-standing hernia problem.

=== Stockport County (loan) ===
On 9 October 2008, Fojut began a one-month loan spell at Stockport County in League One, where he managed just three games due to a hamstring problem.

=== Śląsk Wrocław ===
On 11 February 2009, Fojut signed a three-and-a-half-year contract with Śląsk Wrocław in the Polish Ekstraklasa. On 17 January 2012, Fojut signed a pre-contract agreement with Scottish Premier League club Celtic. Fojut was due to join the club at the start of the 2012–13 Scottish Premier League season, but he suffered a cruciate knee ligament injury while playing for Śląsk Wrocław. Celtic then decided to cancel their contract offer to Fojut.

=== Tromsø IL ===
On 11 December 2012 the player and his agents were observed in Tromsø, Norway for negotiations with Tippeligaen club Tromsø IL. On 21 December the club could inform the public that an agreement for 2.5 years had been reached with Fojut. While warming up ahead of the league-match against Strømsgodset on 29 June 2013, Fojut crashed with an advertising board and broke his nose and was unable to play the match. He was released by Tromsø in the summer of 2014 and subsequently joined Scottish club Dundee United.

=== Dundee United ===
On 14 July 2014, Fojut signed a two-year contract with Scottish Premiership side Dundee United. He made his debut on 10 August 2014, in a 3–0 win against Aberdeen. He scored his first goal for the club later that month in another 3–0 win, this time against St Mirren.

=== Pogoń Szczecin ===
Fojut returned to Poland in June 2015, signing a three-year contract with Ekstraklasa club Pogoń Szczecin.

=== Wisła Płock ===
On 10 June 2019 it was confirmed that Fojut joined Wisła Płock. He only made 3 league and 2 Cup appearances for Wisła in the 2019–20 season.

=== Stal Rzeszów ===
On 11 September 2020, he signed a two-year contract with a third-tier club Stal Rzeszów. He retired after the 2020–21 season and was appointed as Stal's new sporting director.

== International career ==
Fojut has represented Poland at U-19 and U-20 level, where he made appearances at the 2006 UEFA European Under-19 Championship and the 2007 FIFA U-20 World Cup.

== Career statistics ==
Appearances and goals by club, season and competition
Club	Season	League			National cup (Note: Includes FA Cup, Polish Cup, Norwegian Cup, Scottish Cup)		League cup (Note: Includes EFL Cup, Ekstraklasa Cup, Scottish League Cup)		Other		Total	
Club	Season	Division	Apps	Goals	Apps	Goals	Apps	Goals	Apps	Goals	Apps	Goals
Bolton	2005–06	Premier League	1	0	1	0	0	0	0	0	2	0
Bolton	2006–07	Premier League	0	0	0	0	2	0	—		2	0
Bolton	Total		1	0	1	0	2	0	0	0	4	0
Luton Town (loan)	2007–08	Football League One	16	2	3	1	2	0	2	0	23	3
Stockport County (loan)	2008–09	Football League One	3	0	0	0	0	0	0	0	3	0
Śląsk Wrocław	2008–09	Ekstraklasa	9	1	0	0	4	0	—		13	1
Śląsk Wrocław	2009–10	Ekstraklasa	10	0	1	0	—		—		11	0
Śląsk Wrocław	2010–11	Ekstraklasa	23	0	2	0	—		—		25	0
Śląsk Wrocław	2011–12	Ekstraklasa	16	1	2	0	—		—		18	1
Śląsk Wrocław	Total		58	2	5	0	4	0	—		67	2
Tromsø IL	2013	Eliteserien	22	2	3	1	—		12 (Note: Appearances in UEFA Europa League)	0	37	3
Tromsø IL	2014	Norwegian First Division	5	0	0	0	—		—		5	0
Tromsø IL	Total		27	2	3	1	—		12	0	42	3
Dundee United	2014–15	Scottish Premiership	36	4	3	0	4	1	0	0	43	5
Pogoń Szczecin	2015–16	Ekstraklasa	30	2	1	0	—		—		31	2
Pogoń Szczecin	2016–17	Ekstraklasa	31	2	3	0	—		—		34	2
Pogoń Szczecin	2017–18	Ekstraklasa	17	0	0	0	—		—		17	0
Pogoń Szczecin	2018–19	Ekstraklasa	10	0	0	0	—		—		10	0
Pogoń Szczecin	Total		88	4	4	0	—		—		92	4
Wisła Płock	2019–20	Ekstraklasa	3	0	2	0	—		—		5	0
Stal Rzeszów	2020–21	II liga	10	1	0	0	—		—		10	1
Career total			242	15	21	2	12	1	14	0	289	18

== Honours ==
Śląsk Wrocław

- Ekstraklasa: 2011–12
- Ekstraklasa Cup: 2008–09

Individual

- Ekstraklasa Goal of the Season: 2015–16
