= Michał Szromnik =

Polish footballer

Personal information
- Date of birth: 4 March 1993 (age 33)
- Place of birth: Gdańsk, Poland
- Height: 1.90 m (6 ft 3 in)
- Position: Goalkeeper

Team information
- Current team: Śląsk Wrocław
- Number: 25

Youth career
- Gedania Gdańsk
- 2009–2010: Arka Gdynia

Senior career*
Years	Team	Apps	(Gls)
2010–2014	Arka Gdynia	51	(0)
2014–2016	Dundee United	13	(0)
2016–2018	Bytovia Bytów	17	(0)
2018–2019	Odra Opole	15	(0)
2019–2020	Chrobry Głogów	32	(0)
2020–2023	Śląsk Wrocław	50	(0)
2020–2023	Śląsk Wrocław II	10	(0)
2023–2025	Górnik Zabrze	22	(0)
2025–	Śląsk Wrocław	33	(0)

International career
2010	Poland U17	1	(0)
2010–2011	Poland U18	2	(0)
2011	Poland U19	1	(0)
2012	Poland U20	6	(0)
2012–2013	Poland U21	2	(0)
- * Club domestic league appearances and goals as of 12:54, 26 May 2026 (UTC)

Michał Szromnik (born 4 March 1993) is a Polish professional footballer who plays as a goalkeeper for Ekstraklasa club Śląsk Wrocław. He has previously played for Arka Gdynia, Bytovia Bytów, Odra Opole, Górnik Zabrze and Scottish club Dundee United.

== Club career ==
Born in Gdańsk, Szromnik began his career with local regional league club Gedania Gdańsk. He joined Arka Gdynia in 2009 and was promoted to their first team squad a year later. He joined Scottish Premiership side Dundee United in July 2014, signing a three-year contract. He made his first team debut for the club in February 2015, but was sent off in his second appearance. At the end of the 2015–16 season, Szromnik left United by mutual consent. He returned to Poland, signing for I liga club Bytovia Bytów in July 2016. He then joined Odra Opole in June 2018. In July 2019, he joined Chrobry Głogów on a one-year contract. On 4 July 2020, he signed a two-year contract with Śląsk Wrocław. On 13 July 2023, Szromnik joined another Ekstraklasa outfit Górnik Zabrze on a two-year deal. On 23 June 2025, Szromnik returned to Śląsk Wrocław, now in the I liga, on a two-year contract.

== International career ==
Szromnik has previously represented the Poland under-21 team.
