= 2009–10 Dundee United F.C. season =

Dundee United
2009–10 season
- Chairman: Stephen Thompson
- Manager: Craig Levein (until 23 December); Peter Houston (from 28 January)
- Stadium: Tannadice Park
- SPL: Third place
- Scottish Cup: Winners
- League Cup: Quarter–finals
- Top goalscorer: League: Jon Daly (13); All: David Goodwillie (15)
- Highest home attendance: 11,898 vs. Rangers, Scottish Cup, 24 March 2010
- Lowest home attendance: 5,944 vs. Hamilton Academical, SPL, 17 October 2009
Home colours	Away colours	Centenary colours

The 2009–10 season covers the period from 1 July 2009 to 30 June 2010 and was the club's 101st season, having been founded as Dundee Hibernian in 1909.

== Review and Events ==
A number of players joined and left the club in early pre-season. Striker Danny Cadamarteri signed on a Bosman transfer from Huddersfield Town, while goalkeeper Steve Banks arrived as player/goalkeeping coach after negotiating his release from Hearts. Former England under-18 cap Jennison Myrie-Williams arrived after leaving Bristol City while Michael McGovern, who had been signed as back-up on a one-year deal last summer, left the club after failing to make a first-team appearance. Warren Feeney's loan spell also came to an end and wasn't renewed, while a handful of under-19 players were either released or allowed to move to lower league clubs.

The club failed to retain the Keyline Cup they won last year by finishing third in the six-team tournament when they visited Oban in mid July. A series of domestic friendly matches sandwiched a trip to the Republic of Ireland before the club's centenary friendly draw at home to Newcastle United. A friendly win at home to FA Premier League side Blackburn Rovers was the club's last pre-season encounter, although in late July, the club confirmed a November friendly with rivals Dundee to mark the opening of the club's new floodlights. United ran out 3–1 winners with goals from Andis Shala, Danny Cadamarteri and Jon Daly.

The 2009–10 Scottish Premier League season began on Saturday 15 August 2009 with United featuring in the first live SPL match on ESPN two days later, beating Heart of Midlothian. United failed to make it two wins from the opening two matches – last achieved in the 1992-93 season – when they were held to a goalless draw at St Mirren, although they followed up with a 2–1 win at home to Falkirk a week later. The first weekend in September saw an international break with United coming close to ending their seventeen-year wait for a victory at Celtic Park, drawing 1-1. The following week, United's unbeaten start to the season ended when Motherwell won 1–0 at Tannadice, although United responded with an away win against St Johnstone. Successive draws against Hibernian and Hamilton Academical followed before United won the first New Firm derby of the season. At the start of November, United's televised match at home to Rangers was abandoned at half-time due to torrential rain, with Rangers leading 1–0. In United's next match, two Damian Casalinuovo goals saw off Kilmarnock at Rugby Park, for the club's second successive away win; on 22 November, at the 39th time of asking, United finally defeated Celtic in a league match, winning 2–1. United continued their unbeaten run with a hard-fought 2–2 draw away to Motherwell, despite having two players sent off, and followed up with a home win against St Mirren. A 0–0 draw at Hearts preceded a defeat at home to Rangers, in what turned out to be Craig Levein's final match, before another 0–0 draw at home to Kilmarnock. United finally scored in the following match but incredibly lost 7–1 at Rangers, with Kris Boyd scoring a quintuple against United for the second time in his career. A further defeat to Aberdeen followed before a three-game winning streak against Hamilton, Hibernian and Falkirk. St Johnstone were the visitors to Tannadice in a 3–3 draw to close out January. United started February with a pulsating 4–4 draw at Kilmarnock, before a shock defeat at home to Hamilton. A further defeat at Celtic Park followed before a Morgaro Gomis double helped United to three points at home to basement club Falkirk.

Dundee United joined the League Cup 2009-10 campaign in the second round where they beat Alloa Athletic. United won at Ross County in the third round to progress to the quarter-finals, where they were handed a third successive away tie, losing to fellow SPL side St Johnstone.

Dundee United played Partick Thistle in the Scottish Cup Fourth Round on Saturday 9 January 2010, winning 2–0. The fifth round draw gave United another away tie – against St Johnstone – for five consecutive cup ties this season. United gained revenge for the McDiarmid Park defeat in the League Cup, winning 1–0 before being drawn away again, this time to Rangers. After forcing a replay at Tannadice, they saw off Raith Rovers to proceed to the final at Hampden. A pair of goals from Craig Conway in the final against Ross County ensured Dundee United's first Scottish Cup title since 1994. The Ross County game had the most Arabs ever at one match.

The club confirmed the pre-contract signings of three players in June, with Slovak goalkeeper Dušan Perniš to follow in January. Scotland international Andy Webster followed on a season-long loan deal - some eight years after nearly signing from Arbroath, and former Manchester City goalkeeper Nicky Weaver signing on a short-term contract. In late September 2009, midfielder Mark Fotheringham was signed on a three-month contract ahead of his January 2010 move to Anorthosis Famagusta. In February, Latvian defender Pāvels Mihadjuks signed a short-term deal until the end of the season.

Youngster Ross McCord joined Stirling Albion on loan (where older brother Ryan had a previous loan spell), while Danny Grainger joined rivals St Johnstone. In late August, Damián Casalinuovo joined Raith Rovers on a month's loan deal, with Johnny Russell following suit upon the Argentine's return. Marco Andreoni and Conor Grant joined Forfar Athletic on short-term emergency loans in October, with Greg Cameron and Kevin Smith joining Raith on a similar deal. In December, Keith Watson also undertook a temporary move to Fife, joining East Fife.

The club has received three awards during the 2009–10 season, with Craig Levein winning Manager of the Month, and Danny Cadamarteri and Andy Webster winning Player of the Month.

The club's playing kits were sponsored] by JD Sports' Carbrini Sportswear label for a second season, with the firm also sponsoring the shorts. Nike began their four-year deal of kit production with the club's centenary home strip unveiled in mid-June, with the away strip to follow on 24 July. Dundee-based cosmetic car repair specialists Dents8 began a two-year sponsorship of the home and away shorts and the first team's socks.

The club had a third, centenary strip, to mark the club's foundation in 1909. Previously, the last third strip used was in the 2002–03 season. The strip was used in the November 2009 friendly against Dundee but remains unused in competitive competition.

=== Chronological list of events ===
This is a list of the significant events to occur at the club during the 2009–10 season, presented in chronological order. This list does not include transfers, which are listed in the transfers section below, or match results, which are in the results section.

- 7 July: Francisco Sandaza's double hernia rules him out until September.
- 21 July: Prince Buaben is diagnosed with malaria following a visit to his native Ghana.
- 27 July: New signing Damián Casalinuovo becomes the fourth striker to suffer injury after dislocating his shoulder during the final tour match in Ireland.
- 10 September: Danny Cadamarteri is named Player of the Month for August 2009.
- 12 September: The club's centenary dinner takes place.
- 6 October: Scott Robertson is named as a replacement in the Scotland squad for the upcoming friendly in Japan; hours later, he is replaced himself by teammate Craig Conway.
- 23 December: Manager Craig Levein leaves the club to become Scotland manager, with Peter Houston placed in temporary charge.
- 8 January: The deal to bring Bohemians manager Pat Fenlon to Tannadice falls through after both clubs failed to agree on a compensation deal.
- 28 January: Peter Houston is confirmed as the club's manager until the end of the season.
- 28 January: Jon Daly scores the club's 5,000th league goal with a penalty in the 4–4 draw at Kilmarnock.
- 15 May: Dundee United F.C. win the Scottish Cup for only the second time. Goodwillie scored the first from 25 yards and Craig Conway scored a double. United won 3–0 against Ross County.

== Fixtures and results ==
Dundee United have played twelve competitive matches during the 2009–10 season.

=== Friendlies ===
14 July 2009 Friendly	Dunfermline Athletic	0–2	Dundee United	East End Park
			S. Robertson; Goodwillie

17 July 2009 Friendly	Arbroath	1–2	Dundee United XI	Gayfield Park
	Hislop		Casalinuovo; Dow	Referee: Neil Watters

18 July 2009 Friendly	Stirling Albion	1–2	Dundee United	Forthbank Stadium
	Graham 43'		Webster 19'; Goodwillie 54'

20 July 2009 Friendly	(Republic of Ireland) Drogheda United	2–2	Dundee United	United Park
	Crowley 11' (pen.); Ryan 51'		Cadamarteri 67'; Kovacevic 80'

21 July 2009 Friendly	(Republic of Ireland) UCD	0–2	Dundee United	UCD Bowl
			Casalinuovo 41'; S. Robertson 90'

23 July 2009 Friendly	(Republic of Ireland) Kildare County	0–4	Dundee United	Station Park
			Shala 2', 27'; Webster 43'; Kenneth 71'

28 July 2009 Friendly	Inverness CT	1–3	Dundee United	Caledonian Stadium
	Sanchez 38'		Goodwillie 10', 54'; Cadamarteri 79'

29 July 2009 Friendly	Linlithgow Rose	1–2	Dundee United XI	Prestonfield
	Manson

2 August 2009 Friendly	Dundee United	1–1	(England) Newcastle United	Tannadice Park
	Swanson (penalty missed); Goodwillie 85' (pen.)		Carroll 60'	Attendance: 8,876; Referee: C Boyle

4 August 2009 Friendly	Forfar Athletic	0–3	Dundee United XI	Station Park
			Conway; Russell; Collins 47'

8 August 2009 Friendly	Dundee United	2–0	(England) Blackburn Rovers	Tannadice Park
	Goodwillie (penalty missed); Shala 26'; Buaben 70'			Attendance: 3,137; Referee: B Winter

10 November 2009 Friendly	Dundee United	3–1	Dundee	Tannadice Park
	Shala 18'; Cadamarteri 68'; Daly 75'		Clarke 34'	Attendance: 7,774

=== Scottish Premier League ===
17 August 2009 1	Dundee United	2–0	Heart of Midlothian	Tannadice Park
	Cadamarteri 4' (pen.), 85'		Stewart (yellow card) 51' (red card)	Attendance: 8,253; Referee: S Conroy

22 August 2009 2	St Mirren	0–0	Dundee United	St Mirren Park
				Attendance: 4,775; Referee: D McDonald

29 August 2009 3	Dundee United	2–1	Falkirk	Tannadice Park
	Cadamarteri 49'; Goodwillie 56'		Finnbogason 75'	Attendance: 6,979; Referee: C Thomson

12 September 2009 4	Celtic	1–1	Dundee United	Celtic Park
	McDonald 17'		Goodwillie 6'; S Robertson (yellow card) 87' (red card)	Attendance: 58,500; Referee: S Conroy

19 September 2009 5	Dundee United	0–1	Motherwell	Tannadice Park
			Forbes 66' (pen.)	Attendance: 7,196; Referee: D Somers

26 September 2009 6	St Johnstone	2–3	Dundee United	McDiarmid Park
	Dods 37' (o.g.); Hardie 72'		Cadamarteri 34' (pen.); Webster 48'; Casalinuovo 77'; Swanson (red card) 87'	Attendance: 7,225; Referee: D McDonald

3 October 2009 7	Hibernian	1–1	Dundee United	Easter Road
	Zemmama 27'		Webster 72'	Attendance: 13,056; Referee: M Tumilty

17 October 2009 8	Dundee United	1–1	Hamilton Academical	Tannadice Park
	Kenneth 90'		Antoine-Curier 65'	Attendance: 5,944; Referee: I Brines

24 October 2009 9	Aberdeen	0–2	Dundee United	Easter Road
			Casalinuovo 31'; Gomis 36'	Attendance: 11,766; Referee: S Conroy

7 November 2009 10	Kilmarnock	0–2	Dundee United	Rugby Park
			Casalinuovo 22' (pen.), 57'	Attendance: 4,753; Referee: S O'Reilly

22 November 2009 11	Dundee United	2–1	Celtic	Tannadice Park
	Daly 83'; Dods 90'		Robson 71' (pen.)	Attendance: 11,098; Referee: D McDonald

28 November 2009 12	Motherwell	2–2	Dundee United	Fir Park
	Sutton 16'; Jutkiewicz 29'		Webster 14'; Buaben (yellow card) 67' (red card); Daly 83'; Swanson (red card) 87'	Attendance: 4,593; Referee: A Muir

5 December 2009 13	Dundee United	3–2	St Mirren	Tannadice Park
	Casalinuovo 29'; Conway 44'; Myrie-Williams 79'		Dods 61' (o.g.); O'Donnell 85'	Attendance: 6,529; Referee: B Winter

12 December 2009 14	Heart of Midlothian	0–0	Dundee United	Tynecastle Park
			Cadamarteri (penalty missed)	Attendance: 14,873; Referee: E Norris

15 December 2009 15	Dundee United	0–3	Rangers	Tannadice Park
			Beasley 26'; Miller 58', 75'	Attendance: 10,037; Referee: M Tumilty

26 December 2009 16	Dundee United	0–0	Kilmarnock	Tannadice Park
				Attendance: 6,692; Referee: C Thomson

30 December 2009 17	Rangers	7–1	Dundee United	Ibrox Stadium
	Boyd 20' (pen.), 25', 29', 75', 80'; Miller (red card) 51'; Whittaker 68'; Bougherra 85'		Casalinuovo 46'	Attendance: 48,721; Referee: W Collum

2 January 2010 18	Dundee United	0–1	Aberdeen	Tannadice Park
			Mulgrew 15'; Grassi (red card) 64'	Attendance: 10,032; Referee: C Murray

13 January 2010 19	Hamilton Academical	0–1	Dundee United	New Douglas Park
			Goodwillie 75'	Attendance: 2,033; Referee: I Brines

16 January 2010 20	Dundee United	1–0	Hibernian	Tannadice Park
	Swanson 39'			Attendance: 7,000; Referee: S Conroy

24 January 2010 21	Falkirk	1–4	Dundee United	Falkirk Stadium
	Moutinho 90'		Goodwillie 29'; Daly 45', 57', 88'	Attendance: 4,378; Referee: E Norris

27 January 2010 22	Dundee United	3–3	St Johnstone	Tannadice Park
	Daly 52'; Swanson 69'; Myrie-Williams 77'		MacDonald 6'; Craig 21'; Moon 77'	Attendance: 6,600; Referee: S O'Reilly

30 January 2010 23	Kilmarnock	4–4	Dundee United	Rugby Park
	Ford 20'; Kyle 41'; Pascali 55'; Bryson 64'		Buaben 16'; Conway 28', 33'; Daly 66' (pen.)	Attendance: 4,587; Referee: D McDonald

10 February 2010 24	Dundee United	0–2	Hamilton Academical	Tannadice Park
			F.Paixão 23'; M.Paixão 45'	Attendance: 5,598; Referee: A Muir

13 February 2010 25	St Mirren	1–2	Dundee United	St Mirren Park
	Higdon 66'		Swanson 83'; Goodwillie (90.)	Attendance: 3,944; Referee: E Norris

20 February 2010 26	Celtic	1–0	Dundee United	Celtic Park
	Keane 20'			Attendance: 49,000; Referee: C Thomson

27 February 2010 27	Dundee United	3–0	Falkirk	Tannadice Park
	Goodwillie 17' (pen.); Gomis 30', 87'			Attendance: 6,352; Referee: C Murray

7 March 2010 28	Dundee United	1–0	Heart of Midlothian	Tannadice Park
	Gomis 78'			Attendance: 6,683; Referee: M Tumilty

20 March 2010 29	Aberdeen	2–2	Dundee United	Pittodrie Stadium
	Diamond 32'; Paton 45' (pen.)		Daly 8', 24'	Attendance: 9,316; Referee: I Brines

27 March 2010 30	Dundee United	3–0	Motherwell	Tannadice Park
	Goodwillie 38'; Buaben 43'; Swanson 72'			Attendance: 7,609; Referee: W Collum

31 March 2010 31	Hibernian	2–4	Dundee United	Easter Road
	Cregg 1'; Stokes 90'		Daly 20' (pen.); Swanson 26'; Goodwillie 60'; Sandaza 88'	Attendance: 9,185; Referee: S O'Reilly

5 April 2010 32	St Johnstone	0–1	Dundee United	McDiarmid Park
			Daly 83'	Attendance: 5,769; Referee: S Conroy

14 April 2010 33	Dundee United	0–0	Rangers	Tannadice Park
	Kovačević (red card) 70'			Attendance: 11,100; Referee: B Winter

18 April 2010 34	Motherwell	2–3	Dundee United	Fir Park
	Sutton 28', 81'		Daly 5', 43'; Conway 49'	Attendance: 3,544; Referee: C Murray

25 April 2010 35	Dundee United	0–2	Celtic	Tannadice Park
	Myrie-Williams (yellow card) 77' (red card)		Kamara 30'; Keane 90' (pen.)	Attendance: 8,638; Referee: I Brines

1 May 2010 36	Dundee United	1–2	Rangers	Tannadice Park
	Casalinuovo 80'		Boyd 2'; Novo 41'	Attendance: 10,003; Referee: S O'Reilly

5 May 2010 37	Heart of Midlothian	0–0	Dundee United	Tynecastle Park
				Attendance: 12,325; Referee: S Finnie

9 May 2010 38	Dundee United	0–2	Hibernian	Tannadice Park
			Nish 12', 72'	Attendance: 6,527; Referee: C Richmond

=== Scottish League Cup ===
25 August 2009 Second round	Alloa Athletic	0–2	Dundee United	Recreation Park
			Shala 23'; Goodwillie 39'	Attendance: 1,422; Referee: E Norris

22 September 2009 Third round	Ross County	0–2	Dundee United	Victoria Park
	Scott (red card) 83'		Wilkie 36'; Russell 77'	Attendance: 1,986; Referee: C Thomson

27 October 2009 Quarter–finals	St Johnstone	2–1	Dundee United	McDiarmid Park
	Anderson 72'; Dods 76' (o.g.)		Buaben 82'	Attendance: 5,146; Referee: S Conroy

=== Scottish Cup ===
9 January 2010 Fourth round	Partick Thistle	0–2	Dundee United	Firhill Stadium
			Casalinuovo 26'; Goodwillie 90'	Attendance: 4,002; Referee: D McDonald

6 February 2010 Fifth round	St Johnstone	0–1	Dundee United	McDiarmid Park
			Goodwillie 45'	Attendance: 5,636; Referee: Craig Thomson

14 March 2010 Quarter–finals	Rangers	3–3	Dundee United	Ibrox Stadium
	Boyd 34' (pen.), 43' (pen.); Novo 48'		Shala 24'; Whittaker 63' (o.g.); Kovačević 80'	Attendance: 24,096; Referee: Dougie McDonald

24 March 2010 Quarter–final replay	Dundee United	1–0	Rangers	Tannadice Park
	D.Robertson 90'			Attendance: 11,898; Referee: Dougie McDonald

11 April 2010 Semi–finals	Dundee United	2–0	Raith Rovers	Hampden Park
	Goodwillie 28'; Webster 59'			Attendance: 17,671; Referee: Craig Thomson

15 May 2010 Final	Dundee United	3–0	Ross County	Hampden Park
	Goodwillie 61'; Conway 75', 86'			Attendance: 47,122; Referee: Dougie McDonald

== Player statistics ==
During the 2009–10 season, United have used 29 different players on the pitch. The table below shows the number of appearances and goals scored by each player.

No.	Pos	Nat	Player	Total		Scottish Premier League		Scottish Cup		League Cup	
No.	Pos	Nat	Player	Apps	Goals	Apps	Goals	Apps	Goals	Apps	Goals
1	GK	(England) ENG	Nicky Weaver	18	0	18	0	0	0	0	0
1	GK	(Slovakia) SVK	Dusan Pernis	9	0	7	0	2	0	0	0
2	DF	(Republic of Ireland) IRL	Sean Dillon	24	0	20	0	1	0	3	0
3	DF	(Scotland) SCO	Andy Webster	21	3	18	3	1	0	2	0
4	DF	(Scotland) SCO	Lee Wilkie	2	1	1	0	0	0	1	1
5	DF	(Scotland) SCO	Darren Dods	23	1	20	1	1	0	2	0
6	MF	(Scotland) SCO	Craig Conway	27	3	22	3	2	0	3	0
7	MF	(England) ENG	Jennison Myrie-Williams	20	2	18	2	0	0	2	0
8	MF	(Scotland) SCO	Scott Robertson	11	0	9	0	0	0	2	0
9	FW	(Republic of Ireland) IRL	Jon Daly	16	7	14	7	2	0	0	0
10	FW	(England) ENG	Danny Cadamarteri	18	4	16	4	0	0	2	0
11	FW	(Spain) ESP	Francisco Sandaza	32	10	28	10	1	0	3	0
12	MF	(Scotland) SCO	David Robertson	10	2	8	1	2	1	0	0
13	GK	(England) ENG	Steve Banks	3	0	0	0	0	0	3	0
14	MF	(Scotland) SCO	Danny Swanson	24	4	20	3	2	1	2	0
15	MF	(Ghana) GHA	Prince Buaben	25	2	22	1	2	0	1	1
16	MF	(Senegal) SEN	Morgaro Gomis	26	3	22	3	2	0	2	0
17	MF	(Scotland) SCO	Mark Fotheringham	4	0	3	0	0	0	1	0
17	DF	(Latvia) LAT	Pāvels Mihadjuks	2	0	2	0	0	0	0	0
18	DF	(Scotland) SCO	Garry Kenneth	20	1	16	1	2	0	2	0
19	DF	(Switzerland) SUI	Mihael Kovačević	23	0	20	0	1	0	2	0
20	FW	(Germany) GER	Andis Shala	8	1	7	0	0	0	1	1
21	FW	(Argentina) ARG	Damián Casalinuovo	24	7	20	6	2	1	2	0
23	DF	(Scotland) SCO	Paul Dixon	25	0	21	0	2	0	2	0
24	MF	(Scotland) SCO	Greg Cameron	1	0	0	0	1	0	0	0
25	FW	(Scotland) SCO	David Goodwillie	26	10	22	5	2	4	2	1
26	MF	(Scotland) SCO	Ryan McCord	1	0	0	0	0	0	1	0
29	FW	(Scotland) SCO	Johnny Russell	1	1	0	0	0	0	1	1
38	FW	(Scotland) SCO	Dale Hilson	1	0	1	0	0	0	0	0
43	DF	(Scotland) SCO	Ross Smith	1	0	1	0	0	0	0	0
63	MF	(England) ENG	Ashley Hadden	1	0	1	0	0	0	0	0

Goodwillie is the top scorer with eight goals, with the team totalling 45 goals so far. During the 2009–10 season, twelve United players have received at least one caution, with the team having received 29 yellow cards. Six players have been sent off.

Name	Goals	Bookings	Dismissals
Prince Buaben	1	(yellow card) 3	(red card) 2
Danny Cadamarteri	4	(yellow card) 1	
Craig Conway	1		
Jon Daly	5	(yellow card) 1	
Damian Casalinuovo	7		
Paul Dixon		(yellow card) 3	
Darren Dods	1	(yellow card) 2	
Mark Fotheringham		(yellow card) 1	
David Goodwillie	7	(yellow card) 3	
Morgaro Gomis	1	(yellow card) 4	(red card) 1
Garry Kenneth	1	(yellow card) 3	
Mihael Kovacevic		(yellow card) 1	
Jennison Myrie-Williams	1	(yellow card) 4	
Scott Robertson			(red card) 1
Andis Shala	1		
Danny Swanson		(yellow card) 3	(red card) 2
Andy Webster	3	(yellow card) 2	
Lee Wilkie	1		

== Competitions ==
=== League table ===
Pos	Team	Pld	W	D	L	GF	GA	GD	Pts	Qualification or relegation
1	Rangers (C)	38	26	9	3	82	28	+54	87	Qualification for the Champions League group stage
2	Celtic	38	25	6	7	75	39	+36	81	Qualification for the Champions League third qualifying round
3	Dundee United	38	17	12	9	55	47	+8	63	Qualification for the Europa League play-off round (Note: by winning the Scottish Cup.)
4	Hibernian	38	15	9	14	58	55	+3	54	Qualification for the Europa League third qualifying round
5	Motherwell	38	13	14	11	52	54	−2	53	Qualification for the Europa League second qualifying round

Source: SPFL Archive
Rules for classification: 1) points; 2) goal difference; 3) number of goals scored.
(C) Champions

== Transfers ==
=== In ===
Date	Player	From	Fee
1 July 2009	(England) Steve Banks	(Scotland) Heart of Midlothian	Free
1 July 2009	(England) Danny Cadamarteri	(England) Huddersfield Town	Free
1 July 2009	(England) Jennison Myrie-Williams	(England) Bristol City	Free
15 July 2009	(Scotland) Andy Webster	(Scotland) Rangers	Loan
18 July 2009	(Argentina) Damián Casalinuovo	(Argentina) Club Atlético Platense	Free
5 August 2009	(England) Nicky Weaver	(England) Charlton Athletic	Free
25 September 2009	(Scotland) Mark Fotheringham	(England) Norwich City	Free
1 January 2010	(Slovakia) Dušan Perniš	(Slovakia) MŠK Žilina	Free
8 February 2010	(Latvia) Pāvels Mihadjuks	(Latvia) FK Ventspils	Loan

=== Out ===
Date	Player	From	Fee
1 July 2009	(Scotland) Ross McCord	(Scotland) Stirling Albion	Loan
15 July 2009	(England) Danny Grainger	(Scotland) St Johnstone	£40,000
27 August 2009	(Argentina) Damián Casalinuovo	(Scotland) Raith Rovers	Loan
26 September 2009	(Scotland) Johnny Russell	(Scotland) Raith Rovers	Loan
23 October 2009	(Scotland) Marco Andreoni	(Scotland) Forfar Athletic	Loan
23 October 2009	(Scotland) Conor Grant	(Scotland) Forfar Athletic	Loan
20 November 2009	(Scotland) Greg Cameron	(Scotland) Raith Rovers	Loan
27 November 2009	(Scotland) Kevin Smith	(Scotland) Raith Rovers	Loan
3 December 2009	(Scotland) Keith Watson	(Scotland) East Fife	Loan

== See also ==
- 2009–10 Scottish Premier League
- 2009–10 Scottish Cup
- 2009–10 Scottish League Cup
- 2009–10 in Scottish football
