= Scottish Masters Cup =

Indoor football tournament

- Founded: 2023
- Region: Scotland (SFA)
- Teams: 4
- Current champions: Aberdeen (1st title)
- Most championships: Celtic (1 title)
- Broadcaster: BBC Scotland

The Scottish Masters Cup is a six-a-side indoor football competition that was revived in 2023. The games last 16 minutes, with two eight minute halves. All players must be 35 years old or over and there are unlimited substitutions allowed. Each team has a squad of eight players.

== History ==
A one-off Masters Cup was held the previous year. The four-team tournament featured teams from Celtic, Rangers, and English Premier League clubs Liverpool and Manchester United at the Braehead Arena, Glasgow. Liverpool beat Manchester United 5–3 in the final. Luis García was the top scorer on the night. The event was broadcast live on the subscription based online streaming service 360 Sports TV.

Due to success of the event, it was announced the Scottish Masters Cup was being relaunched in 2023. The first line up featured Celtic, Rangers, and Edinburgh derby rivals Hearts and Hibs. Calling Time sponsored the event. BBC Scotland showed live coverage of the competition.

== Results ==
Year	Champion	Runner-up	Third place	Fourth place	Venue	Golden Boot	Ref
2023	Celtic	Hibernian	Hearts	Rangers	Braehead Arena (Glasgow)	(England) Gary Hooper (Celtic)	
2024	Aberdeen	Rangers	Dundee United	Celtic	Event Complex (Aberdeen)	(Scotland) Danny Swanson (Dundee United)	
2025	Aberdeen	Dundee United	Rangers	Celtic	Event Complex (Aberdeen)	(Scotland) Lee Miller (Scotland) Russell Anderson (Aberdeen)	

== Squads ==
=== 2023 ===
Celtic

- (Netherlands) Dorus de Vries
- (Scotland) Mark Wilson
- (England) Kelvin Wilson
- (Wales) Joe Ledley
- (Scotland) Kris Commons
- (Scotland) Simon Donnelly
- (Scotland) Mark Burchill
- (England) Gary Hooper

Hearts

- (Scotland) Roddy McKenzie
- (Italy) Pasquale Bruno
- (Scotland) Andy Webster
- (Scotland) Ryan Stevenson
- (Scotland) Colin Cameron
- (Morocco) Mehdi Taouil
- (Angola) Jose Quitongo
- (Scotland) Ian Black

Hibernian

- (Scotland) Alan Combe
- (Scotland) Ian Murray
- (England) Marvin Bartley
- (Northern Ireland) Ivan Sproule
- (Northern Ireland) Dean Shiels
- (Scotland) Colin Nish
- (England) Grant Holt
- (Scotland) Derek Riordan

Rangers

- (Scotland) Alan Hutton
- (Scotland) Lee McCulloch
- (Scotland) Barry Ferguson
- (Portugal) Pedro Mendes
- (Scotland) Kris Boyd
- (Scotland) Kenny Miller
- (Scotland) Maurice Ross
- (Scotland) Graeme Smith

=== 2024 ===
Aberdeen

- (Scotland) Russell Anderson
- (Republic of Ireland) Jonny Hayes
- (Scotland) Eoin Jess
- (England) Joe Lewis
- (Scotland) Kevin McNaughton
- (Scotland) Lee Miller
- (Scotland) Gavin Rae
- (Scotland) Derek Young

Celtic

- (Scotland) Scott Brown
- (Scotland) Simon Donnelly
- (England) Gary Hooper
- (Wales) Joe Ledley
- (Scotland) Charlie Mulgrew
- (Bulgaria) Stiliyan Petrov
- (Scotland) Barry Robson
- (England) Kelvin Wilson

Dundee United

- (Republic of Ireland) Willo Flood
- (Scotland) Craig Conway
- (Republic of Ireland) Jon Daly
- (Scotland) Paul Gallacher
- (Senegal) Morgaro Gomis
- (Scotland) Garry Kenneth
- (Scotland) John Rankin
- (Scotland) Danny Swanson
- (Scotland) Mark Wilson

Rangers

- (Portugal) Bruno Alves
- (Scotland) Kris Boyd
- (Northern Ireland) Roy Carroll
- (Scotland) Graham Dorrans
- (Scotland) Barry Ferguson
- (Scotland) Lee McCulloch
- (Portugal) Pedro Mendes
- (Spain) Nacho Novo

=== 2025 ===
Aberdeen

- (Scotland) Russell Anderson
- (Republic of Ireland) Jonny Hayes
- (Scotland) Robbie Winters
- (England) Joe Lewis
- (Scotland) Kevin McNaughton
- (Scotland) Lee Miller
- (Scotland) Andrew Considine
- (Scotland) Derek Young

Celtic

- (United States) Paul Rachubka
- (Scotland) Simon Donnelly
- (Scotland) Ross Wallace
- (Wales) Joe Ledley
- (Scotland) Charlie Mulgrew
- (Nigeria) Efe Ambrose
- (Netherlands) Bobby Petta
- (England) Kelvin Wilson

Dundee United

- (Ghana) Prince Buaben
- (Scotland) Paul Dixon
- (Scotland) Paul Gallacher
- (Senegal) Morgaro Gomis
- (Scotland) Garry Kenneth
- (Scotland) John Rankin
- (Scotland) Danny Swanson
- (Scotland) Craig Conway

Rangers

- (Scotland) Kirk Broadfoot
- (England) Martyn Waghorn
- (Scotland) Cammy Bell
- (Scotland) Maurice Ross
- (Scotland) Barry Ferguson
- (Scotland) Lee McCulloch
- (Portugal) Pedro Mendes
- (Spain) Nacho Novo

== Northern Masters ==
The Northern Masters, effectively the Scottish Masters, was one of eight regional heats. All regional winners would compete in a Grand Final to declare the overall winner. The competition ran between 2000 and 2011.

Also, Aberdeen were entered in the North of England heat in 2000, which they won.

Year	Champion	Runner-up	Ref
2000	Rangers	Hearts	
2001	Hearts	Rangers	
2002	Hibs	Rangers	
2003	Rangers	Celtic	
2004	Rangers	Celtic	
2005	Celtic	Motherwell	
2006	Rangers	Motherwell	
2007	Motherwell	Celtic	
2008	Rangers	Celtic	
2009	Celtic	Dundee United	
2010	(England) Sunderland (Note: Sunderland were added to the Northern tournament in 2010 and 2011.)		
2011	Rangers	Motherwell	
