= 2010–11 Dundee United F.C. season =

Dundee United
2010–11 season
- Chairman: Stephen Thompson
- Manager: Peter Houston
- Stadium: Tannadice Park
- SPL: Fourth place
- Scottish Cup: Quarter-finals
- League Cup: Quarter-finals
- UEFA Europa League: Play-off round
- Top goalscorer: League: David Goodwillie (18); All: David Goodwillie (19)
- Highest home attendance: 12,116 vs. AEK Athens, Europa League, 26 August 2010
- Lowest home attendance: 4,041 vs. Ross County, Scottish Cup, 8 January 2011
- Average home league attendance: 7,389
| Home colours | Away colours |

The 2010–11 season was the club's 102nd season, having been founded as Dundee Hibernian in 1909 and their 13th consecutive season in the Scottish Premier League, having competed in it since its inauguration in 1998–99. United also competed in the League Cup and the Scottish Cup.

== Summary ==
The club continued their tradition of participating in the Keyline Cup, visiting Oban in mid July to win the tournament they previously won in 2008. United have confirmed five pre-season friendlies, travelling to Austria for a small pre-season tour and visiting Northern Irish side Glentoran and Championship side Hull City at the end of July. In August, FA Premier League side Wigan Athletic will visit Tannadice Park for the final pre-season friendly.

United began their SPL campaign on Saturday 14 August against St Mirren at St Mirren Park. They entered the UEFA Europa League at the play-off round taking on AEK Athens.

The club's playing kits were sponsored by Calor Gas for the first time. Nike continued with the second year of their four-year deal of kit production. Dundee-based cosmetic car repair specialists Dents8 entered the second year of their two-year sponsorship of the home and away shorts and the first team's socks.

The club also had a third, centenary strip, to mark the club's foundation in 1909. Previously, the last third strip used was in the 2002–03 season. The strip was used in the November 2009 friendly against Dundee but remains unused in competitive competition.

== Results & fixtures ==
=== Friendlies ===
| 15 July 2010 Friendly | (Romania) Unirea Urziceni | 1–0 | Dundee United | Rif, Salzburg |
| | Onofraş 9' |

| 18 July 2010 Friendly | (Poland) Arka Gdynia | 0–0 | Dundee United | Hallein |

| 24 July 2010 Friendly | (Northern Ireland) Glentoran | 1–1 | Dundee United | The Oval, Belfast |
| | Fordyce 62' | | Casalinuovo 90' |

| 27 July 2010 Friendly | Raith Rovers | 0–5 | Dundee United | Stark's Park, Kirkcaldy |
| | | | Goodwillie 6', 10'; D.Robertson 23'; Buaben 47'; Dillon 80' | Referee: Brian Winter |

| 31 July 2010 Friendly | (England) Hull City | 2–1 | Dundee United | KC Stadium, Kingston upon Hull |
| | Cairney 10'; Trialist 49' (o.g.) | | Trialist 14' |

| 3 August 2010 Friendly | Forfar Athletic | 1–4 | Dundee United | Station Park, Forfar |
| | Sellars 10' | | Buaben 14'; Shala 24'; Goodwillie 69', 74' | Attendance: 1,080; Referee: Brian Colvin |

| 8 August 2010 Friendly | Dundee United | 1–3 | (England) Wigan Athletic | Tannadice Park, Dundee |
| | Cadamarteri 84' | | Boselli 38', 48'; Moses 82' | Referee: Mike Tumilty |

=== Scottish Premier League ===
| 14 August 2010 SPL | St Mirren | 1–1 | Dundee United | St Mirren Park, Paisley |
| | Lynch 73' | | Daly 90' | Attendance: 5,618; Referee: Brian Winter |

| 22 August 2010 SPL | Dundee United | 0–4 | Inverness CT | Tannadice Park, Dundee |
| | | | McCann 34'; Rooney 51', 82' (pen.); Duncan 53' | Attendance: 6,575; Referee: Alan Muir |

| 29 August 2010 SPL | Hearts | 1–1 | Dundee United | Tynecastle Stadium, Edinburgh |
| | Templeton 30' | | Gomis 85' | Attendance: 12,898; Referee: Craig Thomson |

| 11 September 2010 SPL | Dundee United | 3–1 | Aberdeen | Tannadice Park, Dundee |
| | Daly 3'; Howard 6' (o.g.); Goodwillie 9' (pen.) | | Vernon 26' | Attendance: 7,973; Referee: Mike Tumilty |

| 18 September 2010 SPL | Rangers | 4–0 | Dundee United | Ibrox Stadium, Glasgow |
| | Dillon 9' (o.g.); Miller 69', 82'; Naismith 77' | | | Attendance: 44,786; Referee: Dougie McDonald |

| 25 September 2010 SPL | Dundee United | 1–0 | St Johnstone | Tannadice Park, Dundee |
| | Goodwillie 61' | | | Attendance: 7,397; Referee: Brian Winter |

| 2 October 2010 SPL | Kilmarnock | 1–2 | Dundee United | Rugby Park, Kilmarnock |
| | Sammon 90' | | Goodwillie 15'; Daly 69' | Attendance: 4,833; Referee: John McKendrick |

| 17 October 2010 SPL | Dundee United | 1–2 | Celtic | Tannadice Park, Dundee |
| | Goodwillie 38' | | Hooper 13', 89' | Attendance: 11,790; Referee: Dougie McDonald |

| 23 October 2010 SPL | Motherwell | 2–1 | Dundee United | Fir Park, Motherwell |
| | Severin 1' (o.g.); Dillon 75' (o.g.) | | Goodwillie 50' (pen.) | Attendance: 4,635; Referee: Steven McLean |

| 30 October 2010 SPL | Dundee United | 1–0 | Hibernian | Tannadice Park, Dundee |
| | Goodwillie 87' | | | Attendance: 7,377; Referee: Stephen Finnie |

| 6 November 2010 SPL | Hamilton Academical | 0–1 | Dundee United | New Douglas Park, Hamilton |
| | | | Goodwillie 76' | Attendance: 2,456; Referee: Calum Murray |

| 10 November 2010 SPL | Dundee United | 1–2 | St Mirren | Tannadice Park, Dundee |
| | Buaben 86' | | Higdon 41', 65' | Attendance: 5,548; Referee: Euan Norris |

| 13 November 2010 SPL | Dundee United | 1–1 | Kilmarnock | Tannadice Park, Dundee |
| | Russell 23' | | Sammon 22' | Attendance: 6,597; Referee: Alan Muir |

| 20 November 2010 SPL | Celtic | 1–1 | Dundee United | Celtic Park, Glasgow |
| | Hooper 23' | | Dillon 90' | Attendance: 47,523; Referee: Mike Tumilty |

| 29 December 2010 SPL | Hibernian | 2–2 | Dundee United | Easter Road, Edinburgh |
| | Bamba 44'; Hanlon 89' | | Goodwillie 2', 35' | Attendance: 10,252; Referee: Stevie O'Reilly |

| 1 January 2011 SPL | Aberdeen | 1–1 | Dundee United | Pittodrie Stadium, Aberdeen |
| | Maguire 36' | | Goodwillie 90' | Attendance: 12,487; Referee: William Collum |

| 12 January 2011 SPL | Dundee United | 2–0 | Motherwell | Tannadice Park, Dundee |
| | Russell 53'; Goodwillie 90' | | | Attendance: 4,918; Referee: Iain Brines |

| 22 January 2011 SPL | Kilmarnock | 1–1 | Dundee United | Rugby Park, Kilmarnock |
| | Sammon 41' | | Kenneth 90' | Attendance: 5,120; Referee: George Salmond |

| 26 January 2011 SPL | St Mirren | 1–1 | Dundee United | St Mirren Park, Paisley |
| | McGregor 38' | | D.Robertson 88' | Attendance: 2,268; Referee: Calum Murray |

| 30 January 2011 SPL | Dundee United | 3–0 | Hibernian | Tannadice Park, Dundee |
| | Daly 13'; Conway 48'; Russell 81' | | | Attendance: 6,215; Referee: Iain Brines |

| 13 February 2011 SPL | Dundee United | 1–3 | Celtic | Tannadice Park, Dundee |
| | Goodwillie 64' | | Stokes 16'; Wilson 36'; Majstorović 78' | Attendance: 11,414; Referee: Mike Tumilty |

| 19 February 2011 SPL | Hearts | 2–1 | Dundee United | Tynecastle Stadium, Edinburgh |
| | Skácel 45'; Žaliūkas 88' | | Douglas 6' | Attendance: 15,473; Referee: Calum Murray |

| 22 February 2011 SPL | St Johnstone | 0–0 | Dundee United | McDiarmid Park, Perth |
| | | | | Attendance: 3,507; Referee: John McKendrick |

| 26 February 2011 SPL | Hamilton Academical | 1–1 | Dundee United | New Douglas Park, Hamilton |
| | Antoine-Curier 33' (pen.) | | Shala 83' | Attendance: 2,011; Referee: Alan Muir |

| 1 March 2011 SPL | Inverness CT | 0–2 | Dundee United | Caledonian Stadium, Inverness |
| | | | Buaben 75'; D.Robertson 90' | Attendance: 3,392; Referee: Steven McLean |

| 7 March 2011 SPL | Dundee United | 3–1 | Aberdeen | Tannadice Park, Dundee |
| | Douglas 29'; Conway 33'; Swanson 60' | | Magennis 51' | Attendance: 7,416; Referee: Brian Winter |

| 10 March 2011 SPL | Dundee United | 2–1 | Hamilton Academical | Tannadice Park, Dundee |
| | Goodwillie 42'; Daly 90' | | F.Paixão 26' | Attendance: 5,766; Referee: William Collum |

| 16 March 2011 SPL | Dundee United | 2–0 | Hearts | Tannadice Park, Dundee |
| | Russell 83', 90' | | | Attendance: 6,718; Referee: Iain Brines |

| 19 March 2011 SPL | Dundee United | 1–0 | Inverness CT | Tannadice Park, Dundee |
| | Swanson 43' | | | Attendance: 6,548; Referee: George Salmond |

| 2 April 2011 SPL | Rangers | 2–3 | Dundee United | Ibrox Stadium, Glasgow |
| | Jelavić 19'; Naismith 52' | | D.Robertson 45'; Russell 77'; Goodwillie 89' | Attendance: 46,697; Referee: Steve Conroy |

| 6 April 2011 SPL | Motherwell | 2–1 | Dundee United | Fir Park, Motherwell |
| | Murphy 26'; Humphrey 41' | BBC SPORT | Russell 79' | Attendance: 3,435; Referee: Stevie O'Reilly |

| 9 April 2011 SPL | Dundee United | 2–0 | St Johnstone | Tannadice Park, Dundee |
| | Russell 45'; D.Robertson 85' | BBC SPORT | | Attendance: 6,398; Referee: Mike Tumilty |

| 19 April 2011 SPL | Dundee United | 0–4 | Rangers | Tannadice Park, Dundee |
| | Kovacevic (red card) 21'; Dillon (red card) 59'; Gomis (red card) 78' | BBC SPORT | Whittaker 22' (pen.), 60' (pen.); Jelavic 72'; Lafferty 83' | Attendance: 11,626; Referee: William Collum |

| 23 April 2011 SPL | Dundee United | 4–2 | Kilmarnock | Tannadice Park, Dundee |
| | Severin 25'; Goodwillie 38', 47'; Conway 49' | BBC SPORT | Silva 70'; Pascali 87' | Attendance: 5,225; Referee: Brian Winter |

| 1 May 2011 SPL | Celtic | 4–1 | Dundee United | Celtic Park, Glasgow |
| | Hooper 23'; Kayal 54'; Commons 85'; Murphy 90' | BBC SPORT | Russell 90' | Attendance: 48,599; Referee: Iain Brines |

| 7 May 2011 SPL | Dundee United | 4–0 | Motherwell | Tannadice Park, Dundee |
| | Daly 36', 43', 49'; Watson 88' | BBC SPORT | | Attendance: 5,951; Referee: Brian Winter |

| 10 May 2011 SPL | Rangers | 2–0 | Dundee United | Ibrox Stadium, Glasgow |
| | Jelavić 21'; Lafferty 25' | BBC SPORT | | Attendance: 49,267; Referee: Calum Murray |

| 15 May 2011 SPL | Dundee United | 2–1 | Hearts | Tannadice Park, Dundee |
| | Goodwillie 22'; Daly 71' | BBC SPORT | Glen 31' | Attendance: 7,119; Referee: Stevie O'Reilly |

=== Scottish Cup ===
| 8 January 2011 Fourth round | Dundee United | 0–0 | Ross County | Tannadice Park, Dundee |
| | | | | Attendance: 4,041; Referee: William Collum |

| 18 January 2011 Fourth round replay | Ross County | 0–0 (a.e.t.) (3–4 p) | Dundee United | Victoria Park, Dingwall |
| | | | | Attendance: 2,430; Referee: William Collum |

| 5 February 2011 Fifth round | Hamilton Academical | 1–3 | Dundee United | New Douglas Park, Hamilton |
| | Antoine-Curier 46' | | Daly 20'; Dixon 39'; Buaben 59' | Attendance: 2,577; Referee: Craig Thomson |

| 13 March 2011 Quarter–finals | Dundee United | 2–2 | Motherwell | Tannadice Park, Dundee |
| | Goodwillie 40'; Daly 73' | | Sutton 1', 72' | Attendance: 7,358; Referee: Calum Murray |

| 30 March 2011 Quarter-final replay | Motherwell | 3–0 | Dundee United | Fir Park, Motherwell |
| | Murphy 8'; Humphrey 36'; Jeffers 63' | | | Attendance: 8,337; Referee: Calum Murray |

=== Scottish League Cup ===
| 22 September 2010 Third round | Ross County | 1–2 (a.e.t.) | Dundee United | Victoria Park, Dingwall |
| | Vigurs 87' | | Goodwillie 61' (pen.); Boyd 101' (o.g.) | Attendance: 2,269; Referee: Craig Thomson |

| 26 October 2010 Quarter-finals | Motherwell | 1–0 | Dundee United | Fir Park, Motherwell |
| | Gow 86' | | | Attendance: 4,838; Referee: William Collum |

=== UEFA Europa League ===
==== Play–off round ====
| 19 August 2010 Play–off round | (Scotland) Dundee United | 0–1 | (Greece) AEK Athens | Tannadice Park, Dundee |
| | | | Djebbour 11' | Attendance: 12,116; Referee: Marijo Strahonja |

| 26 August 2010 Play–off round | (Greece) AEK Athens | 1–1 (2–1 agg.) | (Scotland) Dundee United | Karaiskakis Stadium, Athens |
| | Diop 23' | | Daly 78' | Attendance: 600 (closed to AEK Athens fans); Referee: Libor Kovařík |

== Competitions ==
=== League table ===
| Pos | Team | Pld | W | D | L | GF | GA | GD | Pts | Qualification or relegation |
|---|---|---|---|---|---|---|---|---|---|---|
| 2 | Celtic | 38 | 29 | 5 | 4 | 85 | 22 | +63 | 92 | Qualification for the Europa League play-off round (Note: Celtic entered the play-off round of the 2011–12 UEFA Europa League as they won the 2011 Scottish Cup Final. Due to this, Heart of Midlothian also moved up to the third qualifying round, whilst fourth-placed team Dundee United received the second qualifying round spot.) |
| 3 | Heart of Midlothian | 38 | 18 | 9 | 11 | 53 | 45 | +8 | 63 | Qualification for the Europa League third qualifying round |
| 4 | Dundee United | 38 | 17 | 10 | 11 | 55 | 50 | +5 | 61 | Qualification for the Europa League second qualifying round |
| 5 | Kilmarnock | 38 | 13 | 10 | 15 | 53 | 55 | −2 | 49 | |
| 6 | Motherwell | 38 | 13 | 7 | 18 | 40 | 60 | −20 | 46 | |

Source: SPFL Archive
Rules for classification: 1) points; 2) goal difference; 3) number of goals scored.
