= Keith Watson (footballer) =

Scottish footballer (born 1989)

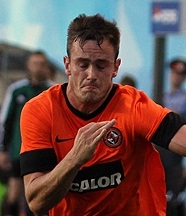
- Watson playing for Dundee United

Personal information
- Full name: Keith Edward Ryan Watson
- Date of birth: 14 November 1989 (age 36)
- Place of birth: Livingston, Scotland
- Height: 1.85 m (6 ft 1 in)
- Position: Defender

Team information
- Current team: Annan Athletic
- Number: 6

Youth career
- Livingston Star BC
- 2004–2006: Dundee United

Senior career*
Years	Team	Apps	(Gls)
2006–2015	Dundee United	123	(8)
2009	→ Forfar Athletic (loan)	0	(0)
2009–2010	→ East Fife (loan)	6	(0)
2015	→ Hibernian (loan)	9	(0)
2015–2016	St Mirren	26	(4)
2016–2018	St Johnstone	6	(1)
2017–2018	→ Hartlepool United (loan)	9	(3)
2018–2023	Ross County	119	(3)
2023–2024	Raith Rovers	14	(0)
2024–2025	Arbroath	28	(1)
2025–	Annan Athletic	33	(3)
- * Club domestic league appearances and goals as of 5 May 2026

Keith Edward Watson (born 14 November 1989) is a Scottish footballer who plays as a defender for Annan Athletic.

A product of Dundee United's youth development system, Watson made his first team debut in January 2007. His early career was disrupted by injury problems, and he spent periods on loan to Forfar Athletic and East Fife before establishing himself in the Dundee United team in 2010; he was a member of the squad that won the Scottish Cup that year. Watson established himself as a regular in the right back position, making his 100th league appearance in February 2014. He spent the latter part of the 2014–15 season on loan at Hibernian.

Watson signed for St Mirren in August 2015 and joined St Johnstone in 2016. He joined Hartlepool United on loan in August 2017, and after leaving St Johnstone in the 2018 close season he signed for Ross County. After five years at the club Watson joined Raith Rovers on a free transfer in 2023.

== Early life ==
Watson was born and brought up in Livingston, where he attended Deans Community High School. He played for Livingston Star Boys Club, a youth team run by his father, before joining the Dundee United youth system at under-14 level.

== Career ==
=== Dundee United ===
Watson was included in the club's first team squad whilst still a youth signing, being an unused substitute for United's last two matches of the 2005–06 season. After signing his first professional contract in December 2006, Watson's debut for the Dundee United first team came in the Scottish Cup third round match against St Mirren in January 2007, when he played 85 minutes in a 3–2 victory. Following this victory, he was described by his then manager Craig Levein as "without fear of contradiction, the best young player I have ever worked with".

Watson, who made his first league appearance as a late substitute in March 2007, was due to start in the match against Celtic shortly afterwards but suffered a dislocated knee during the warm-up. Having featured in a handful of reserve matches throughout September 2008, manager Craig Levein stated he would be sent out on loan to continue his build-up to full fitness and was loaned to Forfar for a month in January 2009. Suffering another knee dislocation in a practice match after playing his first match for Forfar, Watson's loan was extended after it was revealed he would return to playing within weeks,

In 2009, Watson agreed a contract extension with United until May 2012, going out on loan again in December to East Fife.

After returning from loan in March 2010, Watson was brought on as a 47th-minute substitute for Mihael Kovačević in a 1–0 Scottish Cup victory over Rangers. This opportunity lead to 11 appearances in the remainder of the season, culminating in a substitute appearance in the 2010 Scottish Cup Final victory against Ross County on 15 May 2010.

The 2010–11 season saw a breakthrough to regular first team football for Watson, making 34 appearances in total. His first goal was marked against Motherwell in a 4–0 win at Tannadice Park on 7 May 2011, where he also won man of the match. He scored his second Dundee United goal on 17 March 2012 against Rangers.

On 28 January 2015, Watson signed for Hibernian on loan until the end of the season to provide defensive cover for the Edinburgh side. Dundee United announced in April 2015 that Watson would be released when his contract expires at the end of the season.

=== St Mirren ===
Watson signed for St Mirren on a short-term deal in August 2015. His contract was extended in December 2015 to the end of the 2015–16 season.

=== St Johnstone ===
On 2 May 2016, it was announced that Watson had signed a pre-contract agreement with St Johnstone. The contract was for two years, keeping Watson at the club until the summer of 2018. After initially struggling with injuries after joining the club, Watson was subsequently unable to break into the team once Ricky Foster became established in the right back position. Having been restricted to six first team appearances in his first season, Watson joined English National League club Hartlepool United on loan in August 2017, until January 2018. After two injury-troubled seasons, St Johnstone announced that they would release Watson at the end of the 2017–18 season.

=== Ross County ===
Watson signed for Ross County during the 2018 close season. He won the Scottish Championship in his first season with Ross County. Watson was made club captain for the 2021–22 season. On 11 March 2022 Watson signed a new one-year contract keeping him at the club until 2023. Watson left County following the expiry of his contract on 15 June 2023 after five years at the club.

=== Later career ===
On 23 June 2023, Watson joined Scottish Championship side Raith Rovers. He was released in June 2024. After leaving Raith Watson then signed for Arbroath on 25 July 2024. After helping Arbroath win Scottish League One Watson was released by the club and joined Scottish League Two club Annan Athletic.

== Career statistics ==
As of 2 May 2026

Club	Season	League			National Cup		League Cup		Other		Total	
Club	Season	Division	Apps	Goals	Apps	Goals	Apps	Goals	Apps	Goals	Apps	Goals
Dundee United	2006–07	Scottish Premier League	1	0	1	0	0	0	0	0	2	0
Dundee United	2007–08	Scottish Premier League	0	0	0	0	0	0	0	0	0	0
Dundee United	2008–09	Scottish Premier League	0	0	0	0	0	0	0	0	0	0
Dundee United	2009–10	Scottish Premier League	8	0	3	0	0	0	0	0	11	0
Dundee United	2010–11	Scottish Premier League	29	1	5	0	1	0	2 (Note: Appearances in UEFA Europa League)	0	37	1
Dundee United	2011–12	Scottish Premier League	17	1	0	0	1	0	2	1	20	2
Dundee United	2012–13	Scottish Premier League	29	2	4	0	2	0	2	1	37	3
Dundee United	2013–14	Scottish Premiership	25	3	3	0	1	1	0	0	29	4
Dundee United	2014–15	Scottish Premiership	14	1	1	1	1	0	0	0	16	2
Dundee United	Total		123	8	17	1	6	1	6	2	152	12
Forfar Athletic (loan)	2008–09	Scottish Third Division	0	0	1	0	0	0	0	0	1	0
East Fife (loan)	2009–10	Scottish Second Division	6	0	0	0	0	0	0	0	6	0
Hibernian (loan)	2014–15	Scottish Championship	9	0	0	0	0	0	0	0	9	0
St Mirren	2015–16	Scottish Championship	26	4	1	1	1	0	1 (Note: Appearances in the Scottish Challenge Cup)	0	29	5
St Johnstone	2016–17	Scottish Premiership	4	1	1	0	1	0	–		6	1
St Johnstone	2017–18	Scottish Premiership	2	0	0	0	0	0	–		2	0
St Johnstone	Total		6	1	1	0	1	0	0	0	8	1
Hartlepool United (loan)	2017–18	National League	9	3	0	0	0	0	0	0	9	3
Ross County	2018–19	Scottish Championship	27	3	3	0	4	0	1	0	35	3
Ross County	2019–20	Scottish Premiership	17	0	0	0	4	0	–		21	0
Ross County	2020–21	Scottish Premiership	23	0	1	0	2	0	–		26	0
Ross County	2021–22	Scottish Premiership	24	0	0	0	2	0	–		26	0
Ross County	2022–23	Scottish Premiership	28	0	1	0	3	0	2 (Note: Appearances in Scottish Premiership play-offs)	0	34	0
Ross County	Total		119	3	5	0	15	0	3	0	142	3
Raith Rovers	2023–24	Scottish Championship	14	0	0	0	5	1	2	0	21	1
Arbroath	2024–25	Scottish League One	28	1	1	0	1	0	2	0	32	1
Annan	2025–26	Scottish League Two	33	3	2	0	0	0	4	0	39	3
Career total			373	23	28	2	29	2	18	2	448	29

== Honours ==
=== Club ===
Dundee United

- Scottish Cup: 2009–10

Ross County

- Scottish Championship: 2018–19
- Scottish Challenge Cup: 2018–19
