= Prince Buaben =

Ghanaian professional footballer (born 1988)

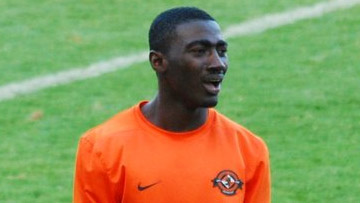

Personal information
- Full name: Prince Christian Buaben
- Date of birth: 23 April 1988 (age 38)
- Place of birth: Akosombo, Ghana
- Height: 1.78 m (5 ft 10 in)
- Position: Central midfielder

Youth career
- 2002–2004: A.V.V. Zeeburgia
- 2004–2007: Ajax

Senior career*
Years	Team	Apps	(Gls)
2007–2011	Dundee United	115	(8)
2011–2013	Watford	31	(1)
2013–2014	Carlisle United	12	(1)
2014	→ Partick Thistle (loan)	11	(0)
2014–2018	Heart of Midlothian	94	(7)
2018	Falkirk	7	(0)
2020	Pandurii Târgu Jiu	7	(0)

International career^{‡}
2008	Ghana	3	(0)
- * Club domestic league appearances and goals as of 5 March 2021 ‡ National team caps and goals as of 00:55, 9 November 2015 (UTC)

Prince Christian Buaben Abankwah (born 23 April 1988), known as Prince Buaben, is a Ghanaian professional footballer.

Buaben grew up in the Netherlands and was a youth player at AFC Ajax. He joined Dundee United in 2007 and won the Scottish Cup with them in 2010. He played in England from 2011, with Watford and later Carlisle United. He returned to Scotland in 2014, playing for Partick Thistle on loan prior to joining Hearts. Buaben helped Hearts win promotion in 2015, during his four years with the club. He signed for Falkirk in October 2018.

Buaben has made one appearance for the Ghana national team.

== Career ==
Buaben was born in Akosombo, Ghana, but his mother took his family to the Netherlands when he was nine, as she thought that they would have a better life there. In the Netherlands where he lived for nine years, his big break came when he was playing for local side AVV Zeeburgia against Ajax in a friendly, which they lost 9–1, with Buaben notching his side's solitary strike. "After the game, Danny Blind told my uncle that they had been impressed with me, but nothing happened for a while. Eventually, Ajax called me and I went there for a two-week trial when I was 13."

=== Dundee United ===
A player who grew up in the famous Ajax Amsterdam youth system mostly as a striker, the 19-year-old did enough to impress Dundee United manager Craig Levein. He did not have the necessary residential status in the Netherlands to obtain the required work visa when a full-time contract was offered to him by the Dutch giants. "In Holland, you cannot play professional football without a resident's permit, and I was not due to get mine until the following year. But, because I did not have a permit, I could not play professionally, and the club had no choice but to let me go," he recalls. He returned to his native Ghana and due to his family's UK status obtained a valid visa, which led to a recommendation to Dundee United manager Craig Levein.

Buaben joined the club as a trialist at the start of pre-season training and has impressed the manager sufficiently to be awarded a full-time contract. On 20 July 2007, Dundee United signed the Ghanaian on a three-year contract, following a successful trial period at Tannadice Park. Levein told the club website: "He's a young player and although talented, will need time to develop and adapt. "I see him as one for the future but have high hopes that he may break into the first team earlier than expected."

Buaben made his Dundee United debut in the friendly 2–2 draw against Raith Rovers at Starks Park on Sunday 22 July 2007. "The Prince" was an instant hit with the fan's, despite being lauded by Levein as "one for the future", Buaben quickly settled into the starting line-up of United after some outstanding performances especially his range of excellent passing, which got rave reviews in match reports The Times Online said "Two of Levein's cheap discoveries, Morgaro Gomis and Prince Buaben, were outstanding for United against Rangers...Both players have brought craft and imagination to the United midfield". Prince was part of the Dundee United team which won the Scottish Cup in their centenary season 2009/2010. In April 2011, Dundee United manager Peter Houston indicated that he expected Buaben to leave the club at the end of the season due to the Terrors being unable to match the players demands.

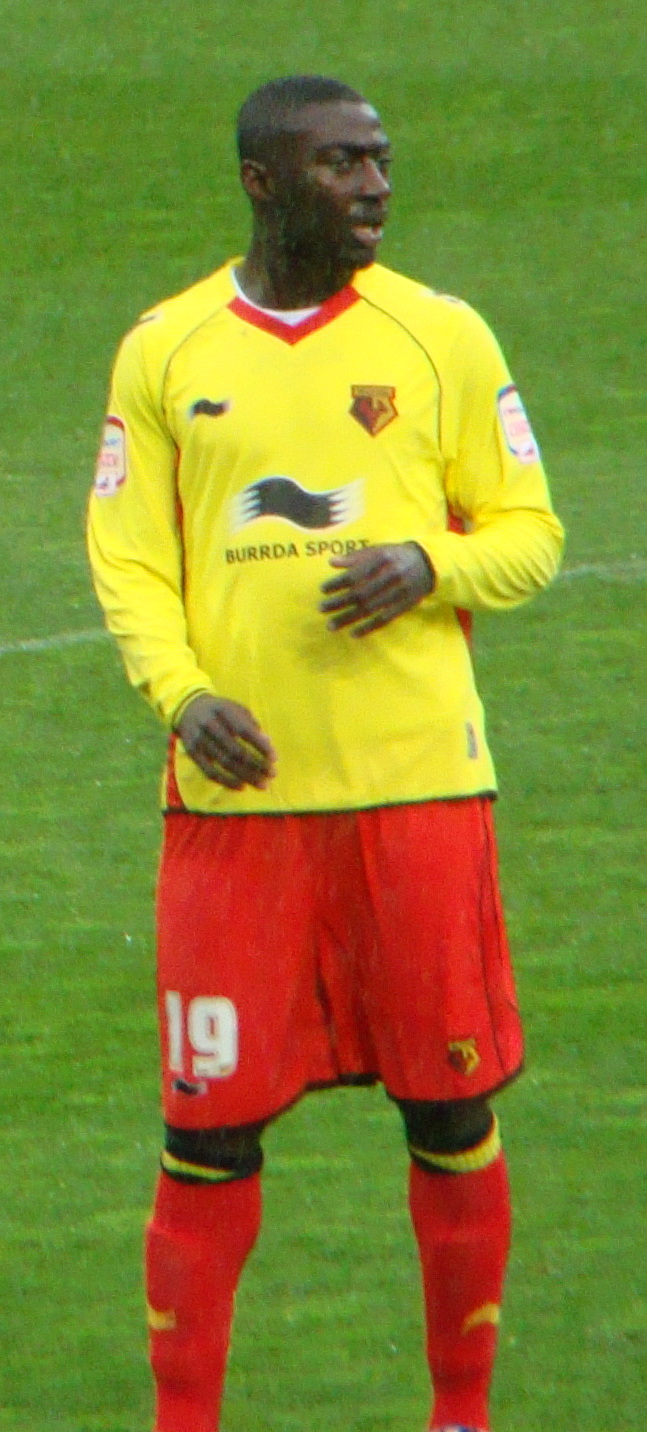
Buaben playing for Watford in 2012.

=== Watford ===
Buaben joined Football League Championship side Watford in July 2011, signing a two-year contract. Buaben struggled in pre-season with a lack of fitness, which halted his attempts to break into the first-team. He had to wait until mid October to make his league debut for Watford, coming on for Michael Kightly in the 20th minute against Leicester City. Buaben made his full league debut for Watford against Peterborough United on 29 October 2011. Watford won the game 3–2 with Buaben instrumental in all three goals. Buaben scored his first goal for Watford in a 1–1 draw against Cardiff City on Boxing day. On 7 June 2013, Watford announced that Buaben's contract would not be renewed and that he was due to be released as a free agent.

=== Carlisle ===
He joined Carlisle United in October 2013 in a deal that would keep him at Brunton Park until the end of the 2013–2014 season. He made twelve league appearances for the Cumbrians. After returning from his loan at Partick Thistle. On 6 May 2014, Carlisle announced that Buaben would be released at the end of his contract.

==== Partick Thistle (loan) ====
Buaben joined Partick Thistle on loan in January 2014, until the end of the season. Buaben returned to England in the summer having made 11 appearances for the Jags, scoring no goals.

=== Hearts ===
Buaben signed a one-year contract with Heart of Midlothian in July 2014. He scored his first Hearts' goal in a 2–1 derby win over Hibernian on 17 August 2014. Buaben's second goal came against Queen of the South at Palmerston Park on 4 October 2014. His third goal came on 18 October from the penalty spot at home against Dumbarton. Prince's fourth goal was a lovely controlled finish in to the bottom left corner of the net in front of the Gorgie Road end at Tynie in a 4–1 victory over Queens. According to the Edinburgh Evening News on 9 December, Prince Buaben said he would like to stay at Hearts 'forever' and was in talks to sign a new long-term contract with the club. Buaben went on to win the Scottish Championship with Hearts but was frustrated to spend much of the later part of the 2014–15 season out injured.

Bauben was released by Hearts at the end of the 2017/18 season.

=== Falkirk ===
Buaben signed a short-term contract with Falkirk on 1 October 2018.

=== International career ===
Buaben received his first call-up to The Black Stars of Ghana national squad in March 2008 for the friendly match against Mexico, although he remained an unused substitute during the match.

== Career statistics ==
As of match played 30 December 2017

Appearances and goals by club, season and competition
Club	Season	League			National Cup		League Cup		Other		Total	
Club	Season	Division	Apps	Goals	Apps	Goals	Apps	Goals	Apps	Goals	Apps	Goals
Dundee United	2007–08	Scottish Premier League	24	3	1	0	5	0	—		30	3
Dundee United	2008–09	Scottish Premier League	22	1	2	1	1	0	—		25	2
Dundee United	2009–10	Scottish Premier League	34	2	6	0	3	1	—		43	3
Dundee United	2010–11	Scottish Premier League	35	2	5	1	2	0	2 (Note: Appearances in the Europa League)	0	44	4
Dundee United	Total		115	8	14	2	11	1	2	0	142	11
Watford	2011–12	Championship	30	1	1	0	1	0	—		32	1
Watford	2012–13	Championship	1	0	0	0	0	0	0	0	1	0
Watford	Total		31	1	1	0	1	0	0	0	33	1
Carlisle United	2013–14	League One	12	1	3	0	0	0	1 (Note: Appearance in the Football League Trophy)	0	16	1
Partick Thistle (loan)	2013–14	Scottish Premiership	11	0	0	0	0	0	—		11	0
Heart of Midlothian	2014–15	Scottish Championship	21	4	1	0	1	0	1 (Note: Appearance in the Scottish Challenge Cup)	0	24	4
Heart of Midlothian	2015–16	Scottish Premiership	36	2	2	0	2	0	—		40	2
Heart of Midlothian	2016–17	Scottish Premiership	20	1	1	0	1	0	4	1	26	2
Heart of Midlothian	2017–18	Scottish Premiership	17	0	1	0	4	0	—		22	0
Heart of Midlothian	Total		95	7	4	0	8	0	5	1	112	8
Career total			264	17	23	2	20	1	8	1	315	21

== Honours ==
Dundee United

- Scottish Cup: 2009–10

Hearts

- Scottish Championship: 2014–15
