= Mihael Kovačević =

Swiss footballer (born 1988)

Personal information
- Date of birth: 6 March 1988 (age 38)
- Place of birth: Basel, Switzerland
- Height: 1.93 m (6 ft 4 in)
- Position: Defender

Youth career
- 2006: BSC Old Boys
- 2006–2007: Dinamo Zagreb

Senior career*
Years	Team	Apps	(Gls)
2007–2008	Koper	1	(0)
2008–2011	Dundee United	49	(0)
2011–2012	Zadar	7	(0)
2012–2014	Ross County	42	(0)
2014	Beroe Stara Zagora	2	(0)
2015	Nyíregyháza Spartacus	13	(0)
2016–2017	FC Black Stars	0	(0)

International career^{‡}
2008	Croatia U21	1	(0)
2008	Switzerland U21	2	(0)
- * Club domestic league appearances and goals as of 18 Nov 2020 ‡ National team caps and goals as of 3 May 2013

Mihael Kovačević (born 6 March 1988) is a Swiss former professional footballer.

== Club career ==
Kovačević was born in Basel, Switzerland, and began his career with spells across Europe, playing for BSC Old Boys in Switzerland, Dinamo Zagreb in Croatia and FC Koper in Slovenia. Following a trial period at Scottish club Dundee United, Kovačević signed for the club during the January 2008 transfer window. He made his debut a month later in a 0–0 draw with Celtic at Celtic Park. He won a runners-up medal in the 2008 Scottish League Cup Final, his second match for the club, after the narrow defeat to Rangers at Hampden Park. Kovačević made a further three first-team starts before the end of the 2007–08 season.

The following season, Kovačević shared the right back position with Seán Dillon, both playing approximately the same number of matches throughout the season. Kovačević suffered a broken cheekbone during the season, which resulted in him wearing a specially-fitted facemask.

The following season, Kovačević scored his first goal, an equaliser in a 3–3 draw against Rangers in the Scottish Cup quarter-finals, After the match, Kovačević criticized Kris Boyd for diving and winning two penalties and hit back on referee Dougie McDonald for his role during the match. Kovačević was part of the team that went on to finish third in the 2009–10 Scottish Premier League and won the 2009–10 Scottish Cup. In another match against Rangers that season, Kovačević was sent off after deliberately kicking away the legs of Kyle Lafferty. After the match, Manager Peter Houston said that Kovačević deserved to be sent-off. Towards the end of the season, Kovačević suffered another injury. Eventually, Kovačević made a return, just in time for the final.

Ahead of a new season, Kovačević suffered another injury during a trip to visit his family in Switzerland, which left him out for four months, as a result Dundee United sought an operation for Mihael. His injury led to the questioning of his future in Dundee as his contract was set to expire in just a few months. Eventually, Kovačević signed a new contract, that kept him until the end of the season. However, his injury was put out again and shortly after making a recovery, Kovačević expected to make a comeback. Towards the end of the season, Kovačević received a red card once again in a 4–0 defeat to Rangers. He was released from the club after spending most of the 2010–11 season out injured.

After not being offered a new deal with Dundee United in summer of 2011, he signed for NK Zadar as a free agent in October 2011. Kovačević made his debut with NK Zadar in Croatian First League against his former club Dinamo Zagreb, in a game which Zadar surprisingly won against Champions League contestant.

Kovačević then returned to Scotland in July 2012, signing for Ross County, having previously gone on trial with the club. Having spent time on the bench for the next five games, Kovačević finally made his debut against - his former club in a 1–1 draw, having come on as a substitute for Ross Tokely on 14 September 2012. Due to the absence of Tokely, Kovačević soon took up the right-back position and established himself in the first team.

It was confirmed on 21 May 2013 that Kovačević had been handed a contract extension as a reward for the fifth-placed finish in the SPL.

On 22 January 2014, Kovačević was released by Ross County.

In July 2014, he signed with Beroe in the A PFG.

After a move to Hungary in 2015 and then back to his native Switzerland in 2016, Kovačević retired from professional football on 1 July 2017.

== International career ==
He played for both Switzerland and Croatia at the Under-21 level.

In November 2008, Kovačević received his first call-up to the Switzerland under-21 side.

== Personal life ==
On 31 December 2010, it was announced that Kovačević is to appear in court after being accused of driving at 104 mph in a 40 mph zone, having driven his Audi A8 4-2 Quattro dangerously and at "grossly excessive speeds" on Dundee's East Dock Street, which happened two months ago. After a month of the case, Kovačević was sentenced to carry out the community service, fined £700 and disqualified from driving for 14 months. Kovačević admitted driving dangerously and at grossly excessive speeds, having been confused over the speed limit. To carry out community service, Kovacevic was told by the court that he needed to do the community service in order to make an example" to young people.

During his time at Dundee United, Kovačević shared a flat with teammates Andis Shala and David Robertson, while Morgaro Gomis, Francisco Sandaza and Prince Buaben live next door in Dundee.

== Honours ==
=== Dundee United ===
- Scottish Cup : 1

2010

- Scottish League Cup Runner-up: 1

2007–08
