= 2013–14 Dundee United F.C. season =

Dundee United
2013–14 season
- Chairman: Stephen Thompson
- Manager: Jackie McNamara
- Stadium: Tannadice Park
- Premiership: Fourth place
- League Cup: Quarter-final
- Scottish Cup: Runners-up
- Top goalscorer: League: Nadir Çiftçi (11); All: Nadir Çiftçi (17)
- Highest home attendance: 12,601 vs. Aberdeen; Premiership; 1 January 2014
- Lowest home attendance: 3,778 vs. Partick Thistle; League Cup; 25 September 2013
- Average home league attendance: 7,599
Home colours	Away colours	Third colours

The 2013–14 season is the club's 105th season, having been founded as Dundee Hibernian in 1909 and their first season in the Scottish Premiership. United will also compete in the League Cup and the Scottish Cup.

== Results & fixtures ==
Win Draw Loss Postponed

=== Preseason ===
7 July 2013 Friendly	(Germany) Union Berlin	4 – 1	Dundee United	Stadion An der Alten Försterei
19:00	Nemec 30', 37'; Skrzybski 63'; Terodde 69'	Report	Graham 71'	Attendance: 4,118

12 July 2013 Friendly	(Germany) FC Energie Cottbus	2 – 0	Dundee United	Stadion der Freundschaft
19:00	Mosquera 18'; Bickel 79'	Report		Attendance: 5,422

19 July 2013 Friendly	(Spain) San Roque	3 – 1	Dundee United	Estadio Manolo Mesa
19:00	Koue 9' (Own goal); Walker 12'; Juanjo 25'	Report	Goodwillie 40'	Attendance: 100

24 July 2013 Friendly	Dunfermline Athletic	1 – 3	Dundee United	East End Park
19:30	Faulkingham 11'	Report	Gauld 22'; Goodwillie 52'; Dow 58'	Attendance: 1,830; Man of the Match: Ryan Gauld

27 July 2013 Friendly	(England) Wigan Athletic	0 – 1	Dundee United	DW Stadium
15:00			Çiftçi 52'	Attendance: 3,838; Referee: Darren Bond

=== Scottish Premiership ===
2 August 2013 Scottish Premiership	Partick Thistle	0 – 0	Dundee United	Firhill Stadium
19:45		BBC Report		Attendance: 7,822; Referee: Craig Thomson

10 August 2013 Scottish Premiership	Dundee United	0 – 1	Inverness Caledonian Thistle	Tannadice Park
15:00		BBC Report	McKay 20'	Attendance: 6,664; Referee: Steven McLean

17 August 2013 Scottish Premiership	Hibernian	1 – 1	Dundee United	Easter Road
15:00	Robertson 81'	BBC Report	Armstrong 29'	Attendance: 9,171; Referee: Crawford Allan

24 August 2013 Scottish Premiership	Dundee United	4 – 0	St Johnstone	Tannadice Park
15:00	Watson 4'; Goodwillie 25'; Mackay-Steven 40'; Armstrong 53'	BBC Report		Attendance: 6,992; Referee: Bobby Madden

31 August 2013 Scottish Premiership	Dundee United	0 – 1	Celtic	Tannadice Park
12:45		BBC Report	Stokes 87'	Attendance: 10,586; Referee: Crawford Allan

15 September 2013 Scottish Premiership	Ross County	2 – 4	Dundee United	Victoria Park
12:45	Sproule 72'; Quinn 77'	BBC Report	Mackay-Steven 18' (pen.); Armstrong 20'; Gauld 40'; Çiftçi 65'	Attendance: 3,005; Referee: Brian Colvin

22 September 2013 Scottish Premiership	Dundee United	2 – 2	Motherwell	Tannadice Park
15:00	Çiftçi 54'; Robertson 57'	BBC Report	Anier 30'; Ainsworth 76'	Attendance: 5,808; Referee: Kevin Clancy

28 September 2013 Scottish Premiership	Heart of Midlothian	0 – 0	Dundee United	Tynecastle Stadium
15:00		BBC Report		Attendance: 13,970; Referee: Steven McLean

5 October 2013 Scottish Premiership	Dundee United	1 – 0	Kilmarnock	Tannadice Park
15:00	Çiftçi 56'	BBC Report		Attendance: 5,850; Referee: Willie Collum

19 October 2013 Scottish Premiership	Aberdeen	1 – 0	Dundee United	Pittodrie Stadium
15:00	Zola 54'	BBC Report		Attendance: 12,654; Referee: Bobby Madden

26 October 2013 Scottish Premiership	Dundee United	4 – 0	St Mirren	Tannadice Park
15:00	Çiftçi 27', 34' (pen.); Gauld 59'; Erskine 83'	BBC Report		Attendance: 6,331; Referee: Iain Brines

2 November 2013 Scottish Premiership	Celtic	1 – 1	Dundee United	Celtic Park
15:00	Mulgrew 90'	BBC Report	Armstrong 38'	Attendance: 47,386; Referee: Alan Muir

9 November 2013 Scottish Premiership	Motherwell	0 – 4	Dundee United	Fir Park
15:00		BBC Report	Gauld 16', 64'; Paton 19'; Robertson 90'	Attendance: 5,103; Referee: Steven McLean

23 November 2013 Scottish Premiership	Dundee United	4 – 1	Partick Thistle	Tannadice Park
15:00	Mackay-Steven 2', 77'; Robertson 70'; Graham 85'	BBC Report	Muirhead 57' (pen.)	Attendance: 6,700; Referee: Willie Collum

7 December 2013 Scottish Premiership	Dundee United	4 – 1	Heart of Midlothian	Tannadice Park
15:00	Armstrong 16'; Graham 49'; Mackay-Steven 85'; Rankin 90'	BBC Report	Hamill 20' (pen.)	Attendance: 7,808; Referee: Craig Thomson

14 December 2013 Scottish Premiership	Kilmarnock	1 – 4	Dundee United	Rugby Park
15:00	Kris Boyd 89'	BBC Report	Watson 60'; Armstrong 75'; Gauld 77'; Goodwillie 90'	Attendance: 3,452; Referee: Euan Norris

21 December 2013 Scottish Premiership	Dundee United	1 – 0	Ross County	Tannadice Park
15:00	Mackay-Steven 69'	BBC Report		Attendance: 8,029; Referee: Iain Brines

26 December 2013 Scottish Premiership	St Mirren	4 – 1	Dundee United	St Mirren Park
15:00	Thompson 12', 88'; McGinn 35'; Naismith 71'	BBC Report	Ciftci 36'; Watson (red card) 70'	Attendance: 4,780; Referee: Madden

29 December 2013 Scottish Premiership	St Johnstone	3 – 0	Dundee United	McDiarmid Park
	May 20' (pen.), 57', 87'	BBC Report	Butcher (red card) 20'	Attendance: 7,231; Referee: Finnie

1 January 2014 Scottish Premiership	Dundee United	1 – 2	Aberdeen	Tannadice Park
	Souttar 51'	BBC Report	Robson 64' (pen.); Pawlett 91'	Attendance: 12,601; Referee: Collum

5 January 2014 Scottish Premiership	Dundee United	2 – 2	Hibernian	Tannadice Park
	Goodwillie 83'; Graham 90'	BBC Report	Craig 38', 61' (pen.)	Attendance: 7,862; Referee: Steven McLean

12 January 2014 Scottish Premiership	Inverness Caledonian Thistle	1 – 1	Dundee United	Caledonian Stadium
	McKay 5'	BBC Report	Watson 10'	Attendance: 2,980; Referee: Beaton

18 January 2014 Scottish Premiership	Ross County	3 – 0	Dundee United	Victoria Park
	Kiss 42', 74'; Arquin 69'	BBC Report		Attendance: 3,609; Referee: Charleston

1 February 2014 Scottish Premiership	Partick Thistle	1 – 1	Dundee United	Firhill Stadium
15:00	Fraser 75'	BBC Report	El Alagui 29'	Attendance: 3,748; Referee: Collum

15 February 2014 Scottish Premiership	Dundee United	3 – 2	Kilmarnock	Tannadice Park
15:00	Mackay-Steven 10'; Good 65'; Rankin 71'	BBC Report	Eremenko 40'; Boyd 64'	Attendance: 6,038; Referee: Beaton

21 February 2014 Scottish Premiership	Dundee United	3 – 1	Motherwell	Tannadice Park
19:45	Dow 22'; Gunning 42', 47'	BBC Report	Sutton 57' (pen.)	Attendance: 7,029; Referee: Madden

28 February 2014 Scottish Premiership	Hibernian	1 – 3	Dundee United	Easter Road
19:45	Forster 45'	BBC Report	Ciftci 43'; Gunning 56'; El Alagui 83'	Attendance: 9,608; Referee: Euan Norris

12 March 2014 Scottish Premiership	Dundee United	0 – 1	St Johnstone	Tannadice Park
15:00		Report	May 48'	Attendance: 6,720; Referee: Crawford Allan

15 March 2014 Scottish Premiership	Dundee United	3 – 2	St Mirren	Tannadice Park
15:00	Graham 79'; Armstrong 84'; Ciftci 90+3'	Report	McGowan 20'; Thompson 40'	Attendance: 6,524; Referee: Craig Thomson

21 March 2014 Scottish Premiership	Heart of Midlothian	1 – 2	Dundee United	Tynecastle
19:45	Wilson 78'	BBC Report	Graham 35'; Ciftci 70'	Attendance: 13,448; Referee: Madden

26 March 2014 Scottish Premiership	Dundee United	2 – 1	Inverness Caledonian Thistle	Tannadice Park
19:45	Gauld 49'; Dow 76'	Report	Polworth 81'	Attendance: 6,754; Referee: Euan Norris

29 March 2014 Scottish Premiership	Aberdeen	1 – 1	Dundee United	Pittodrie Stadium
	McGinn 52'	BBC Report	Paton 6'	Attendance: 14,627; Referee: Murray

5 April 2014 Scottish Premiership	Dundee United	0 – 2	Celtic	Tannadice Park
		BBC Report	Samaras 5'; Stokes 24'	Attendance: 11,033; Referee: Thomson

19 April 2014 Scottish Premiership	St Johnstone	2 – 0	Dundee United	McDiarmid Park
15:00	Anderson 32'; May 76'	BBC Report		Attendance: 5,223; Referee: Beaton

26 April 2014 Scottish Premiership	Dundee United	5 – 1	Motherwell	Tannadice Park
15:00	Çiftçi 8', 41'; Armstrong 61'; Dow 72'; Graham 81'	BBC Report	Ainsworth 88'	Attendance: 6,383; Referee: McLean

3 May 2014 Scottish Premiership	Inverness Caledonian Thistle	1 – 1	Dundee United	Caledonian Stadium
15:00	Christie 7'	BBC Report	El Alagui 71'	Attendance: 3,428; Referee: Colvin

6 May 2014 Scottish Premiership	Dundee United	1 – 3	Aberdeen	Tannadice Park
19:45	Dillon 34'	BBC Report	Vernon 7', 55', 76'	Attendance: 8,677; Referee: Murray

11 May 2014 Scottish Premiership	Celtic	3 – 1	Dundee United	Celtic Park
12:15	Stokes 64'; Samaras 76' (pen.); Commons 82'	BBC Report	Twardzik 79' (o.g.)	Attendance: 52,400; Referee: Collum

=== Scottish League Cup ===
Dundee United entered the competition in the second round and were drawn against Scottish Championship side Dumbarton. They won the tie 3-2 and progressed to face fellow Scottish Premiership team Partick Thistle in the third round. They defeated Partick Thistle 4–1 with David Goodwillie scoring a hat-trick but then lost to Inverness Caledonian Thistle in the quarter-finals.

28 August 2013 Round 2	Dumbarton	2 – 3	Dundee United	The Bet Butler Stadium
19:45	Smith 34'; Megginson 87'	BBC Report	Çiftçi 69', 89'; Gauld 77'	Attendance: 1,045; Referee: Alan Muir

25 September 2013 Round 3	Dundee United	4 – 1	Partick Thistle	Tannadice Park
19:45	Goodwillie 33', 45', 90'; Dow 87'	BBC Report	Elliott 89'	Attendance: 3,778; Referee: Calum Murray

29 October 2013 Quarter Final	Inverness Caledonian Thistle	2 – 1 (a.e.t.)	Dundee United	Caledonian Stadium
19:45	Warren 54'; Draper 120'	Report	Watson 5'	Attendance: 2,133; Referee: Kevin Clancy

=== Scottish Cup ===
Dundee United entered the Scottish Cup in the fourth round and came from behind to defeat Kilmarnock 5–2 to progress to the next stage. They followed this up with wins against St Mirren and Inverness Caledonian Thistle to reach the semi-finals. They were drawn to face Rangers at Ibrox as the usual venue, Hampden Park, was being redeveloped for the 2014 Commonwealth Games. United were unhappy with this as they felt the game should be played a neutral venue, as is usually the case for semi-finals, but their request to move the game elsewhere was rejected. In spite of this, United went on to win 3-1 and faced St Johnstone in the final. Demand for tickets was high with over 28,000 being sold, but the large support was ultimately left disappointed as United lost 2–0.

29 November 2013 Round 4	Dundee United	5 – 2	Kilmarnock	Tannadice Park
19:45	Robertson 27', 76'; Armstrong 64'; Graham 82' (pen.); Mackay-Steven 84'	BBC Report	Barr 48'; Johnston 50'	Attendance: 6,979; Referee: Calum Murray

9 February 2014 Round 5	Dundee United	2 – 1	St Mirren	Tannadice Park
12:00	Gauld 21'; Çiftçi 51'	BBC Report	McLean 26' (pen.)	Attendance: 4,952; Referee: Craig Thomson

9 March 2014 Quarter Final	Inverness Caledonian Thistle	0 – 5	Dundee United	Caledonian Stadium
12:30		Report	Çiftçi 16', 28'; Gunning 36' (pen.); Mackay-Steven 49'; Armstrong 57'	Attendance: 3,164; Referee: Willie Collum

12 April 2014 Semi Final	Rangers	1 – 3	Dundee United	Ibrox Stadium
12:45	Smith 42'	BBC Report	Armstrong 23'; Mackay-Steven 36'; Çiftçi 83'	Attendance: 41,059; Referee: Madden

17 May 2014 Final	Dundee United	0 – 2	St Johnstone	Celtic Park
15:00		BBC Report	Anderson 45+1'; MacLean 84'	Attendance: 47,345; Referee: Craig Thomson

== Player statistics ==
=== Squad information ===
Last updated 6 June 2014

No.	Pos	Nat	Player	Total		Premiership		League Cup		Scottish Cup	
No.	Pos	Nat	Player	Apps	Goals	Apps	Goals	Apps	Goals	Apps	Goals
1	GK	(Poland) POL	Radosław Cierzniak	45	0	37+0	0	3+0	0	5+0	0
2	DF	(Republic of Ireland) IRL	Sean Dillon	27	1	22+1	1	2+0	0	2+0	0
3	DF	(Australia) AUS	Curtis Good	5	1	4+0	1	0+0	0	1+0	0
4	DF	(England) ENG	Calum Butcher	9	0	6+0	0	2+1	0	0+0	0
5	DF	(Republic of Ireland) IRL	Gavin Gunning	33	4	26+1	3	2+0	0	4+0	1
6	MF	(Scotland) SCO	Paul Paton	45	2	36+1	2	3+0	0	5+0	0
7	FW	(Scotland) SCO	David Goodwillie	22	6	10+9	3	2+0	3	0+1	0
8	MF	(Scotland) SCO	John Rankin	43	2	35+0	2	3+0	0	5+0	0
9	FW	(Scotland) SCO	Brian Graham	36	7	12+18	6	2+1	0	0+3	1
10	MF	(Scotland) SCO	Stuart Armstrong	43	11	32+4	8	2+0	0	5+0	3
11	MF	(Scotland) SCO	Gary Mackay-Steven	41	10	27+8	7	1+0	0	5+0	3
12	DF	(Scotland) SCO	Keith Watson	29	4	24+1	3	1+0	1	2+1	0
14	MF	(Scotland) SCO	Mark Millar	1	0	0+0	0	0+1	0	0+0	0
15	FW	(Scotland) SCO	Michael Gardyne	0	0	0+0	0	0+0	0	0+0	0
16	DF	(Scotland) SCO	Mark Wilson	19	0	14+0	0	2+0	0	3+0	0
17	MF	(Scotland) SCO	Chris Erskine	9	1	4+4	1	0+1	0	0+0	0
18	FW	(Scotland) SCO	Ryan Dow	31	4	16+10	3	0+1	1	2+2	0
19	MF	(Scotland) SCO	Ryan Gauld	38	8	21+10	6	2+1	1	3+1	1
20	DF	(Scotland) SCO	John Souttar	27	1	21+1	1	1+1	0	3+0	0
21	FW	(Turkey) TUR	Nadir Çiftçi	40	17	27+5	11	2+1	2	5+0	4
23	FW	(Scotland) SCO	Dale Hilson	0	0	0+0	0	0+0	0	0+0	0
25	GK	(Scotland) SCO	Marc McCallum	1	0	1+0	0	0+0	0	0+0	0
26	DF	(Scotland) SCO	Andrew Robertson	44	5	36+0	3	3+0	0	5+0	2
27	MF	(Senegal) SEN	Morgaro Gomis	21	0	5+11	0	0+1	0	0+4	0
28	FW	(England) ENG	Kudus Oyenuga	1	0	0+1	0	0+0	0	0+0	0
29	FW	(France) FRA	Farid El Alagui	15	3	4+9	3	0+0	0	0+2	0
37	MF	(Scotland) SCO	Scott Smith	2	0	0+2	0	0+0	0	0+0	0
39	FW	(Scotland) SCO	Aidan Connolly	2	0	0+2	0	0+0	0	0+0	0
40	MF	(Scotland) SCO	Darren Petrie	0	0	0+0	0	0+0	0	0+0	0
41	MF	(Scotland) SCO	Scott Fraser	1	0	0+1	0	0+0	0	0+0	0

=== Disciplinary record ===
Includes all competitive matches.

Last updated 6 June 2014

Number	Nation	Position	Name	Premiership		League Cup		Scottish Cup		Total	
Number	Nation	Position	Name	Yellow card	Red card	Yellow card	Red card	Yellow card	Red card	Yellow card	Red card
1	(Poland)	GK	Radosław Cierzniak	1	0	0	0	0	0	1	0
2	(Republic of Ireland)	DF	Sean Dillon	0	0	1	0	0	0	1	0
3	(Australia)	DF	Curtis Good	1	0	0	0	0	0	1	0
4	(England)	DF	Calum Butcher	2	1	0	0	0	0	2	1
5	(Republic of Ireland)	DF	Gavin Gunning	4	1	1	0	2	0	7	1
6	(Scotland)	MF	Paul Paton	5	0	2	0	1	0	8	0
8	(Scotland)	MF	John Rankin	3	0	1	0	1	0	5	0
9	(Scotland)	FW	Brian Graham	0	0	2	0	0	0	2	0
10	(Scotland)	MF	Stuart Armstrong	3	0	0	0	1	0	4	0
11	(Scotland)	MF	Gary Mackay-Steven	3	0	1	0	1	0	5	0
12	(Scotland)	DF	Keith Watson	2	1	0	0	0	0	2	1
16	(Scotland)	DF	Mark Wilson	5	0	0	0	1	0	6	0
17	(Scotland)	MF	Chris Erskine	1	0	0	0	0	0	1	0
18	(Scotland)	FW	Ryan Dow	3	0	0	0	0	0	3	0
19	(Scotland)	MF	Ryan Gauld	1	0	0	0	0	0	1	0
20	(Scotland)	DF	John Souttar	1	0	0	0	0	0	1	0
21	(Turkey)	FW	Nadir Çiftçi	6	0	0	1	2	0	8	1
26	(Scotland)	DF	Andrew Robertson	6	0	1	0	1	0	8	0
27	(Senegal)	MF	Morgaro Gomis	2	0	1	0	0	0	3	0

== Team statistics ==
=== League table ===
Pos	Team	Pld	W	D	L	GF	GA	GD	Pts	Qualification or relegation
1	Celtic (C)	38	31	6	1	102	25	+77	99	Qualification for the Champions League second qualifying round
2	Motherwell	38	22	4	12	64	60	+4	70	Qualification for the Europa League second qualifying round
3	Aberdeen	38	20	8	10	53	38	+15	68	Qualification for the Europa League first qualifying round
4	Dundee United	38	16	10	12	65	50	+15	58	
5	Inverness Caledonian Thistle	38	16	9	13	44	44	0	57	
6	St Johnstone	38	15	8	15	48	42	+6	53	Qualification for the Europa League second qualifying round (Note: St Johnstone, as winners of the 2013–14 Scottish Cup, qualified for the Europa League second qualifying round.)
7	Ross County	38	11	7	20	44	62	−18	40	
8	St Mirren	38	10	9	19	39	58	−19	39	
9	Kilmarnock	38	11	6	21	45	66	−21	39	
10	Partick Thistle	38	8	14	16	46	65	−19	38	
11	Hibernian (R)	38	8	11	19	31	51	−20	35	Qualification for the Premiership play-off final
12	Heart of Midlothian (R)	38	10	8	20	45	65	−20	23 (Note: Heart of Midlothian were deducted 15 points for entering administration)	Relegation to the Championship

Source: SPFL Archive
Rules for classification: 1) points; 2) goal difference; 3) number of goals scored.
(C) Champions; (R) Relegated

=== Division summary ===
Round	1	2	3	4	5	6	7	8	9	10	11	12	13	14	15	16	17	18	19	20	21	22	23	24	25	26	27	28	29	30	31	32	33	34	35	36	37	38
Ground	A	H	A	H	H	A	H	A	H	A	H	A	A	H	H	A	H	A	A	A	H	A	A	A	H	H	A	H	H	A	H	A	H	A	H	A	H	A
Result	D	L	D	W	L	W	D	D	W	L	W	D	W	W	W	W	W	L	L	L	D	D	L	D	W	W	W	L	W	W	W	D	L	L	W	D	L	L
Position	6	8	8	6	7	5	6	6	6	6	5	6	6	4	3	3	2	4	5	5	4	4	5	5	4	4	4	4	4	4	4	4	4	4	4	4	4	4

Updated to match(es) played on 6 June 2014. Source:
A = Away; H = Home; W = Win; D = Draw; L = Loss

== Transfers ==
=== Players in ===
Player	From	Fee
(Northern Ireland) Paul Paton	(Scotland) Partick Thistle	Free
(Scotland) Chris Erskine	(Scotland) Partick Thistle	Free
(Scotland) Brian Graham	(Scotland) Raith Rovers	Free
(Scotland) Andrew Robertson	(Scotland) Queen's Park	Undisclosed
(Scotland) Aidan Connolly	(Scotland) Queen's Park	Undisclosed
(Scotland) David Goodwillie	(England) Blackburn Rovers	Loan
(England) Calum Butcher	(England) Hayes & Yeading United	Free
(England) Kudus Oyenuga	(England) Hayes & Yeading United	Free
(Turkey) Nadir Çiftçi	(Netherlands) NAC Breda	Free
(Scotland) Mark Wilson	(England) Bristol City	Free
(Senegal) Morgaro Gomis	(England) Birmingham City	Free
(France) Farid El Alagui	(England) Brentford	Loan
(Australia) Curtis Good	(England) Newcastle United	Loan

=== Players out ===
Player	To	Fee
(Scotland) Johnny Russell	(England) Derby County	£750,000
(Republic of Ireland) Jon Daly	(Scotland) Rangers	Free
(Republic of Ireland) Willo Flood	(Scotland) Aberdeen	Free
(England) Steve Banks	(Scotland) St Johnstone	Free
(Scotland) Barry Douglas	(Poland) Lech Poznań	Free
(Sweden) Marcus Törnstrand	(Sweden) Östersund	Free
(Northern Ireland) Brian McLean	(Scotland) Ross County	Free
(Republic of Ireland) Richie Ryan	(Republic of Ireland) Shamrock Rovers	Free
(Scotland) Ryan Ferguson	(Scotland) Dunfermline Athletic	Loan
(Scotland) Luke Johnston	(Scotland) Dunfermline Athletic	Loan
(Scotland) Jordan Moore	(Scotland) Dunfermline Athletic	Loan
(Scotland) Dale Hilson	(Scotland) Forfar Athletic	Loan
(Scotland) Michael Gardyne	(Scotland) Kilmarnock	Loan
(Scotland) Aidan Connolly	(Scotland) Brechin City	Loan
(Scotland) Darren Petrie	(Scotland) Brechin City	Loan
(Scotland) Mark Millar	(Scotland) Falkirk	Loan
(Scotland) Ross Gilmour	(Scotland) Airdrieonians	Loan
(Scotland) Luke Johnston	(Scotland) Montrose	Loan
(Scotland) Joe McGovern	(Scotland) Clyde	Loan
(Scotland) Chris Erskine	(Scotland) Partick Thistle	Loan
(Scotland) Ryan Ferguson	(Scotland) Brechin City	Free
