= Danny Swanson =

Scottish footballer (born 1986)

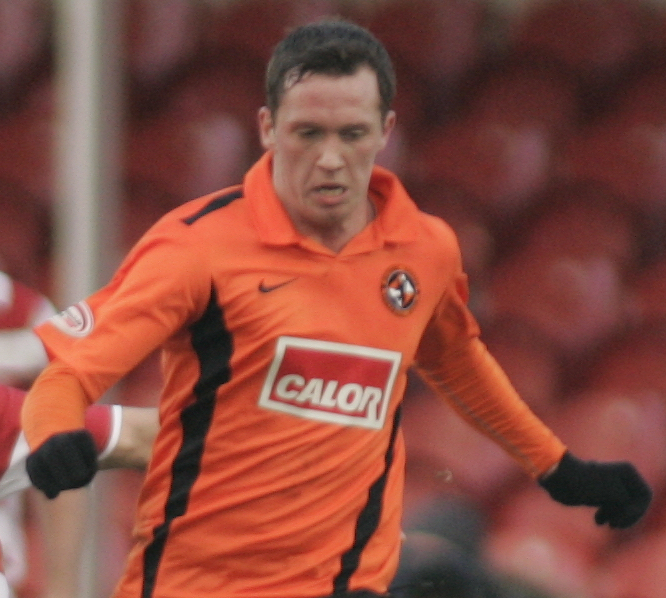
- Swanson playing for Dundee United in 2011

Personal information
- Full name: Daniel Joseph Swanson
- Date of birth: 28 December 1986 (age 39)
- Place of birth: Leith, Scotland
- Height: 1.68 m (5 ft 6 in)
- Position: Attacking midfielder

Youth career
- Cowdenbeath
- Hutchison Vale
- Leith Athletic

Senior career*
Years	Team	Apps	(Gls)
2005–2008	Berwick Rangers	27	(12)
2008–2012	Dundee United	108	(14)
2012–2014	Peterborough United	62	(9)
2014–2015	Coventry City	15	(2)
2015	→ St Johnstone (loan)	11	(2)
2015–2016	Heart of Midlothian	8	(0)
2016–2017	St Johnstone	44	(11)
2017–2018	Hibernian	31	(3)
2018–2020	St Johnstone	30	(2)
2020–2022	East Fife	25	(0)
2024–	Cowdenbeath	4	(0)
- * Club domestic league appearances and goals as of 14 December 2024

Daniel Joseph Swanson (born 28 December 1986) is a Scottish footballer who plays as an attacking midfielder for Lowland League East club Cowdenbeath

Swanson started his career at Scottish Third Division side Berwick Rangers before moving to Scottish Premier League club Dundee United in 2008. He moved to England in 2012 to play for Peterborough United. After two years with Peterborough he signed for Coventry City, but he then moved back to Scotland on loan at St Johnstone. Swanson was released by Coventry in September 2015, and then signed for Hearts of Midlothian, where he spent five months before returning to St Johnstone. Swanson then played forHibernian for a brief period of time before returning to St Johnstone once again in 2018. In 2020, he joined East Fife on a two-year deal and left in the summer of 2022. After a two year hiatus from football, he returned to play for Cowdenbeath.

== Career ==
=== Early career ===
Born with a heart defect, Swanson underwent a number of operations as a child, including a heart bypass at the age of thirteen. After overcoming his health problems, Swanson played for Hutchison Vale and Leith Athletic before joining Berwick Rangers, making his debut at the start of the 2005–06 season. Playing the majority of Scottish Third Division matches that season, a knee injury restricted him to just three league appearances the following season when Berwick were promoted to the Scottish Second Division, although he started the 2007–08 season injury-free.

=== Dundee United ===
Swanson completed a move to the Scottish Premier League with Dundee United on 1 January 2008 after agreeing terms in October 2007, having previously turned down a move to Hamilton Academical. Making his debut the following day as a substitute in the 4–1 win over Hearts, Swanson scored his first goal for United in a 2–0 victory over Motherwell in March 2008, going on to feature in a number of matches that season. In 2008–09, Swanson was used mainly as a substitute, starting in only seven of his 30 league appearances. In the 2009–10 season, Swanson started United's opening three league matches, assisting three of the club's four goals in the process.

His good performances for United meant that Swanson was selected for the Scotland squad in October 2011. Soon afterwards, however, Swanson strained a medial ligament. At the end of the 2011–12 season, Swanson's contract expired and he opened talks with Championship side Peterborough United over a possible move to England.

=== Peterborough United ===
On 6 June 2012, Swanson signed a two-year contract with English Championship club Peterborough United after making over 100 appearances for Dundee United.

The midfielder made a total of 79 appearances scoring 5 goals before rejecting a new contract offer with Posh at the end of the 2013-2014 season.

Swanson won the EFL Trophy with Peterborough United at Wembley Stadium in 2014.

=== Coventry City ===
On 3 July 2014, Swanson signed a two-year contract with Coventry City after rejecting a new contract at Peterborough United.

Swanson signed on loan for St Johnstone for the latter part of the 2014–15 season on 3 February 2015. He returned to Coventry City for close season 2015, but had his contract terminated on 1 September 2015 by mutual consent.

=== Heart of Midlothian ===
Swanson signed for Heart of Midlothian on 9 September 2015, agreeing a contract to the end of the 2015–16 season.

=== St Johnstone (second stint) ===
After just five months with Hearts, Swanson signed for his former side St Johnstone in February 2016 on an 18-month deal.

In April 2017, Swanson brought St Johnstone in to disrepute after becoming involved in an on-pitch brawl with teammate Ricky Foster. Both players were suspended by the club and were subsequently fined four weeks' wages.

=== Hibernian ===
On 25 April 2017, Hibernian announced that they had signed Swanson on a pre-contract agreement. Injuries restricted his appearances for Hibs in the first part of the 2017/18 season. Swanson was linked with a return to St Johnstone in January 2018, but he decided against this. His contract with Hibs was cancelled on 31 August 2018.

=== St Johnstone (third stint) ===
After his release from Hibernian, Swanson resigned for St Johnstone in September 2018, stating that he was "at his happiest" whilst playing for the Perth club. He was released by the club in May 2020.

=== East Fife ===
On 30 July 2020, Danny Swanson signed for East Fife, on a two-year deal.

=== Cowdenbeath ===
After 2.5 years without competitive football, on 6 September 2024 Swanson signed with Cowdenbeath in the fifth-tier Lowland Football League.

== Career statistics ==
As of 11 October 2021

Club	Season	League			National Cup		League Cup		Other^{[A]}		Total	
Club	Season	Division	Apps	Goals	Apps	Goals	Apps	Goals	Apps	Goals	Apps	Goals
Berwick Rangers	2005–06	Scottish Third Division	27	1	1	0	2	0	4	0	34	1
Berwick Rangers	2006–07	Scottish Third Division	3	0	0	0	0	0	0	0	3	0
Berwick Rangers	2007–08	Scottish Second Division	13	3	0	0	2	0	2	1	17	4
Berwick Rangers	Total		43	4	1	0	4	0	6	1	54	5
Dundee United	2007–08	Scottish Premier League	12	2	2	0	0	0	—		14	2
Dundee United	2008–09	Scottish Premier League	30	0	2	0	2	0	—		34	0
Dundee United	2009–10	Scottish Premier League	31	5	6	0	2	0	—		39	5
Dundee United	2010–11	Scottish Premier League	21	2	2	0	0	0	1	0	24	2
Dundee United	2011–12	Scottish Premier League	14	3	0	0	1	0	1	0	16	3
Dundee United	Total		108	12	12	0	5	0	2	0	127	12
Peterborough United	2012–13	Championship	27	2	1	0	2	0	—		30	2
Peterborough United	2013–14	League One	35	2	3	0	3	1	8	0	49	3
Peterborough United	Total		62	4	4	0	5	1	8	0	79	5
Coventry City	2014–15	League One	15	0	0	0	1	0	2	0	18	0
St Johnstone (loan)	2014–15	Scottish Premiership	11	2	1	0	0	0	0	0	12	2
Heart of Midlothian	2015–16	Scottish Premiership	8	0	0	0	1	0	—		9	0
St Johnstone	2015–16	Scottish Premiership	14	1	0	0	0	0	0	0	14	1
St Johnstone	2016–17	Scottish Premiership	30	10	1	0	6	5	—		37	15
St Johnstone	Total		44	11	1	0	6	5	0	0	51	16
Hibernian	2017–18	Scottish Premiership	17	0	0	0	4	1	—		21	1
Hibernian	2018–19 (Note: Soccerbase did not record an appearance made by Swanson against NSI Runavik on 19 July 2018.)	Scottish Premiership	2	0	0	0	0	0	2	0	4	0
Hibernian	Total		26	0	0	0	4	1	2	0	31	3
St Johnstone	2018–19	Scottish Premiership	23	0	1	0	1	0	—		25	0
St Johnstone	2019–20	Scottish Premiership	7	0	0	0	4	0	—		11	0
St Johnstone	Total		30	0	1	0	5	0	0	0	36	0
East Fife	2020–21	Scottish League One	15	0	2	0	1	0	—		18	0
Career total			355	33	22	0	32	7	20	1	429	41

A. The "Other" column constitutes appearances and goals (including substitutes) in the 2006 Scottish Second Division play-offs, Scottish Challenge Cup, UEFA Europa League, Football League Trophy & 2014 Football League play-offs.

== Honours ==
=== Club ===
Dundee United

- Scottish Cup: 2009–10

Peterborough United

- Football League Trophy: 2013–14
