= Morgaro Gomis =

Senegalese footballer (born 1985)

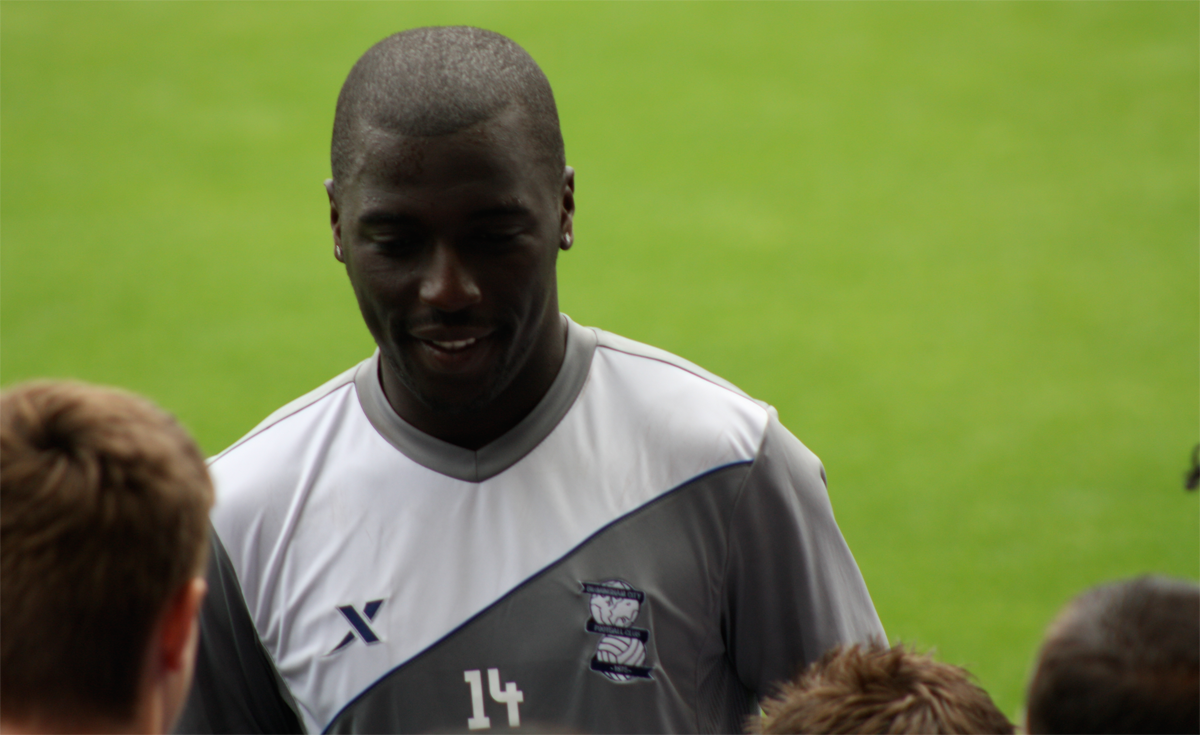
- Gomis with Birmingham City in 2011

Personal information
- Full name: Morgaro Lima Gomis
- Date of birth: 14 July 1985 (age 41)
- Place of birth: Le Blanc-Mesnil, France
- Height: 1.75 m (5 ft 9 in)
- Position: Defensive midfielder

Team information
- Current team: Broxburn Athletic

Youth career
- Montpellier

Senior career*
Years	Team	Apps	(Gls)
2004–2005	Windsor & Eton	18	(1)
2005	Dagenham & Redbridge	0	(0)
2005	Windsor & Eton	5	(0)
2005	Barnet	0	(0)
2005–2006	Lewes	14	(1)
2006–2007	Cowdenbeath	15	(2)
2007–2011	Dundee United	150	(6)
2011–2013	Birmingham City	31	(0)
2013–2014	Dundee United	16	(0)
2014–2016	Heart of Midlothian	51	(1)
2016	→ Motherwell (loan)	10	(0)
2016–2018	Kelantan	32	(1)
2018	Sur SC		
2019	Dundee United	5	(0)
2019–2021	Falkirk	40	(1)
2021–2022	Clyde	50	(0)
2023	Kelantan United	13	(0)
2024–2026	East Stirlingshire	98	(2)
2026-	Broxburn Athletic		

International career
2009	Senegal	2	(0)
- * Club domestic league appearances and goals as of 14:55, 10 January 2024 (UTC)

Morgaro Lima Gomis (born 14 July 1985) is a Senegalese professional footballer who plays as a defensive midfielder for Broxburn Athletic.

Starting his career in France, Gomis spent most of his early career in English non-League football before moving to Scottish Football League side Cowdenbeath. His performances earned him a move to Dundee United in January 2007, where he exceeded expectations and was young player of the year for 2007–08. He was part of the Dundee United side that won the Scottish Cup in 2010 and was the first African to have played 100 times for the club. He left the club when his contract expired at the end of the 2010–11 season to join Football League Championship side Birmingham City. Gomis left Birmingham City in July 2013, having made 43 appearances for the club. He then rejoined Dundee United for a season before signing for Hearts in 2014. In 2016, he was loaned to Motherwell and made 10 appearances for the club before joining Kelantan in July 2016. After spending time with Omani club Sur SC in 2018, he returned to Scotland in January 2019 for a third spell with Dundee United, and joined Falkirk for the 2019–20 season. Following his release from Falkirk in May 2021 he signed for fellow Scottish League One club Clyde.

Although born in Paris and self-identifying as French, Gomis represented Senegal at international level, for whom he qualified through his Senegalese parents.

== Career ==
=== Early career ===
Gomis was at Montpellier in his youth and had unsuccessful trials with Chelsea, Freiburg and Lausanne-Sport.

=== England ===
Gomis spent several years playing in English non-League football. In 2004, he signed for Windsor & Eton and featured in 18 league matches, scoring once. In January 2005, Gomis moved to Dagenham & Redbridge but the move quickly became controversial after an agent became involved in a contract row with the club. Gomis left in March 2005 without making an appearance and rejoined Windsor, playing in five matches before the end of the season. Gomis had a short stay with Barnet at the start of the 2005–06 season – where he featured in a matchday squad once as an unused substitute – but his month-to-month contract was not renewed and he moved to Lewes. He made his league debut in a 5–2 defeat of Weston-super-Mare on 15 October – the club website's match report suggested that manager Steve King "may well have unearthed another little gem in Morgaro Gomis, whose contribution after arriving on the field as a 55th minute substitute was key to the eventual success." – and played in fourteen Conference South matches, scoring once, during the season.

=== Cowdenbeath ===
In July 2006, Gomis moved to Scotland and joined Cowdenbeath who at the time were managed by Mixu Paatelainen. While at the Central Park club, Gomis scored twice: he "floated home a delightful shot from 20 yards high into the visitors' net" in a 4–2 win against Peterhead and a stoppage-time header to secure a 3–2 win at home to Forfar Athletic.

=== Dundee United ===
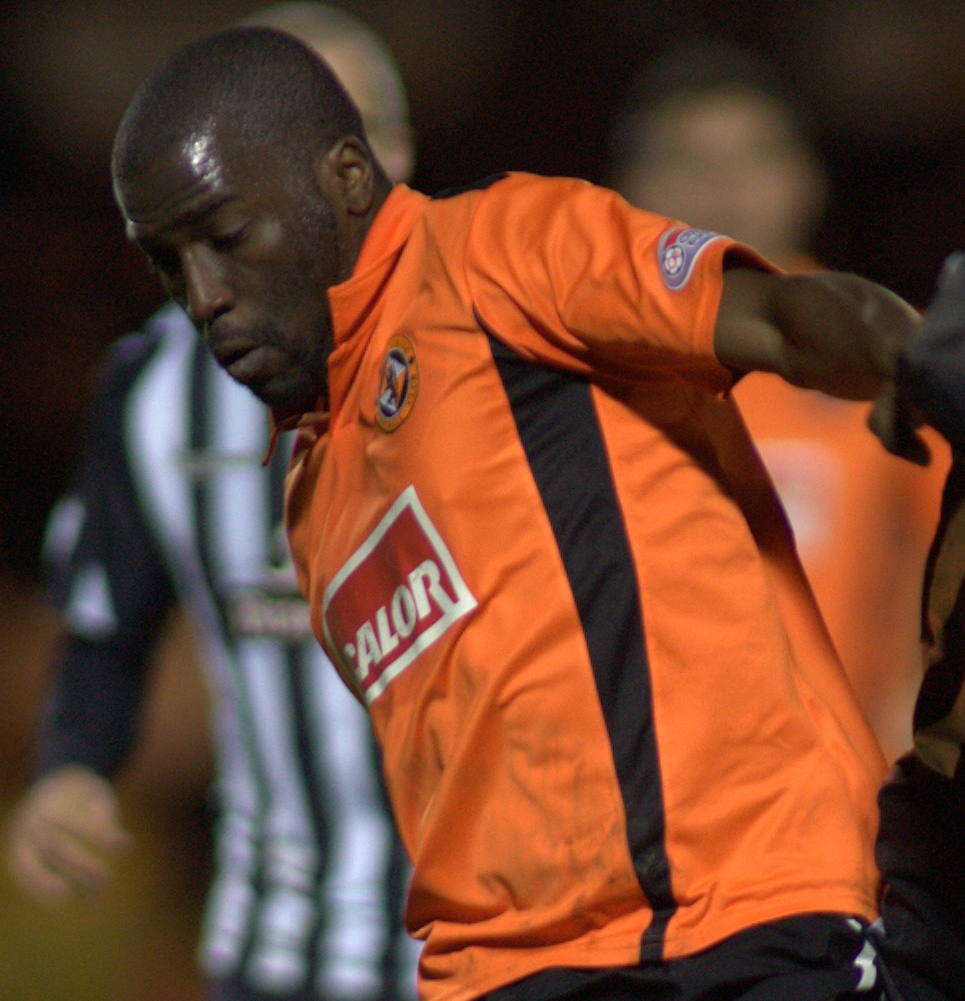
Gomis playing for Dundee United

On 8 December, just four months after his Cowdenbeath debut, Gomis agreed a move to Scottish Premier League side Dundee United and joined in January 2007, signing until the end of the following season. Such was Gomis's earlier-than-expected impact – manager Craig Levein had said upon signing him that he would not go straight into the first team – that he was given a two-year extension to his contract in September 2007. In January 2009, Gomis received a further extension to his contract. Gomis received the first winner's medal of his senior career as a member of the Dundee United squad that won the 2010 Scottish Cup Final against Ross County.

In April 2011, manager Peter Houston indicated that he expected Gomis to leave at the end of the season because the club was unable to match the player's demands.

=== Birmingham City ===
On 16 June 2011, Championship club Birmingham City completed the signing of free agent Gomis on a two-year deal. He made his debut in the Football League on the opening day of the 2011–12 season, playing the whole of a 2–1 defeat at Derby County. At home to Millwall, Gomis, described by the Telegraph's reporter as "combin[ing] industry with silky passes from his deep-lying central midfield position", played a "deliciously weighted pass" behind the defence from which Jean Beausejour crossed for Chris Wood to open the scoring.

In May 2013, Birmingham confirmed that they were not going to take up their option to extend Gomis' contract, so he was to leave the club at the end of the season when his existing deal expired.

=== Return to Dundee United ===
After training with the club for several weeks, Gomis rejoined Dundee United on 10 October 2013; he signed a contract until the end of the 2013–14 season. He made his first appearance on 26 October, in a 4–0 victory against St Mirren. On 12 April 2014, he came on as a substitute in the Scottish Cup semifinal at Ibrox as United defeated Rangers 3–1, progressing to the final, in which he was an unused substitute as Dundee United lost 2–0 to St Johnstone. With John Rankin and Paul Paton an established pairing in midfield, Gomis struggled for game time. He made only five starts and sixteen substitute appearances in all competitions, and was among nine players to be released by the club when their contracts expired at the end of the season.

=== Heart of Midlothian ===
On 12 June 2014, Gomis signed for Heart of Midlothian on a three-year contract. He was the first signing under the management of Robbie Neilson, as well as the first signing since Hearts came out of administration. On 30 November, he was sent off in the eighth minute of Hearts' Scottish Cup fourth-round match at home to Celtic for a two-footed challenge on Scott Brown; Hearts lost the match 4–0.

In February 2016, Gomis moved on loan to fellow Scottish Premiership club Motherwell until the end of the season.

=== Kelantan ===
On 11 July 2016, Gomis signed for Kelantan on a one-year contract, becoming the second signing of Kelantan for second transfer window under the new head coach, Velizar Popov.

On 3 December 2017, Gomis extended his contract with Kelantan for another year.

=== Third spell at Dundee United ===
Gomis spent time with Sur SC of the Oman Professional League in 2018 before returning to Scotland where he trained with Dundee United. On 11 January 2019, he signed for his third spell with the club, saying that he "[was looking] forward to playing in front of the United fans again." Towards the end of his first league appearance of the new spell, a 1–0 defeat to Ayr United, he was sent off for a second yellow card. Gomis was released by United on 6 May, before the play-offs.

=== Falkirk ===
On 18 June 2019, Gomis signed for Falkirk on a one-year contract.

=== Clyde ===
On 27 May 2021, Gomis signed for Scottish League One side Clyde. On 23 December 2022, Gomis left the club by mutual consent.

=== East Stirlingshire ===
In January 2024, following a spell in Malaysia with Kelantan United, Gomis returned to Scotland with Lowland League club East Stirlingshire on an eighteen-month deal.

== International career ==
In March 2009, Gomis received his first international call-up, being named in Senegal's squad for friendly matches against Oman and Iran. Having been born in France of Senegalese parents, Gomis had always considered himself to be French, but was reportedly "flattered and surprised" by the call-up. Having initially said he would consider carefully whether to accept, he later announced his decision to play for Senegal. He made his debut that week in the starting eleven against Oman, a 2–0 defeat, and played as a substitute in the 1–1 draw with Iran.

== Career statistics ==
As of match played 10 December 2022

Appearances and goals by club, season and competition
Club	Season	League			National Cup (Note: Includes FA Cup, Scottish Cup, Malaysia FA Cup)		League Cup (Note: Includes Football League Cup, Scottish League Cup, Malaysia Cup)		Other		Total	
Club	Season	Division	Apps	Goals	Apps	Goals	Apps	Goals	Apps	Goals	Apps	Goals
Windsor & Eton	2004–05	Isthmian League Premier Div.	23	1	0	0	—		0	0	23	1
Lewes	2005–06	Conference South	14	1	2	0	—		0	0	16	1
Cowdenbeath	2006–07	Scottish Second Division	15	2	0	0	2	0	2 (Note: Appearances in Scottish League Challenge Cup)	0	19	2
Dundee United	2006–07	Scottish Premier League	12	0	0	0	0	0	—		12	0
Dundee United	2007–08	Scottish Premier League	36	1	3	0	5	1	—		44	2
Dundee United	2008–09	Scottish Premier League	37	0	2	0	4	0	—		43	0
Dundee United	2009–10	Scottish Premier League	31	4	6	0	2	0	—		39	4
Dundee United	2010–11	Scottish Premier League	34	1	4	0	2	0	2 (Note: Appearances in UEFA Europa League)	0	42	1
Dundee United	Total		150	6	15	0	13	1	2	0	180	7
Birmingham City	2011–12	Championship	16	0	5	0	1	0	2	0	24	0
Birmingham City	2012–13	Championship	15	0	2	0	2	0	—		19	0
Birmingham City	Total		31	0	7	0	3	0	2	0	43	0
Dundee United	2013–14	Scottish Premiership	16	0	4	0	1	0	—		21	0
Heart of Midlothian	2014–15	Scottish Championship	34	1	1	0	1	0	1	0	37	1
Heart of Midlothian	2015–16	Scottish Premiership	17	0	0	0	4	0	—		21	0
Heart of Midlothian	Total		51	1	1	0	5	0	1	0	58	1
Motherwell (loan)	2015–16	Scottish Premiership	10	0	1	0	—		—		11	0
Kelantan	2016	Malaysia Super League	10	0	0	0			—		10	0
Kelantan	2017	Malaysia Super League	20	0	1	0			—		21	1
Kelantan	2018	Malaysia Super League	2	0	0	0	0	0	—		2	0
Kelantan	Total		32	0	1	0			0	0	33	1
Dundee United	2018–19	Scottish Championship	5	0	3	0	0	0	0	0	8	0
Falkirk	2019–20	Scottish League One	22	1	4	0	3	0	1	0	30	1
Falkirk	2020–21	Scottish League One	18	0	1	0	4	0	0	0	23	0
Falkirk	Total		40	1	5	0	7	0	1	0	53	1
Clyde	2021–22	Scottish League One	33	0	1	0	4	0	1	0	39	0
Clyde	2022–23	Scottish League One	17	0	1	0	4	0	2	0	24	0
Clyde	Total		50	0	2	0	8	0	3	0	63	0
Career total			437	12	41	0	39	2	11	0	528	14

== Honours ==
Lewes

- Sussex Senior Challenge Cup: 2005–06

Dundee United

- Scottish Cup: 2010

Heart of Midlothian

- Scottish Championship: 2014–15
