= Damián Casalinuovo =

Argentine footballer

Personal information
- Full name: Damián Leandro Casalinuovo
- Date of birth: 6 June 1987 (age 39)
- Place of birth: Buenos Aires, Argentina
- Position: Striker

Youth career
- 2007–2008: Velez Sarsfield

Senior career*
Years	Team	Apps	(Gls)
2008	Velez Sarsfield	2	(0)
2008–2009	Platense	0	(0)
2009–2010	Dundee United	25	(7)
2009	→ Raith Rovers (loan)	3	(2)
2010–2011	Hamilton Academical	19	(0)
2012	Raith Rovers	11	(3)
- * Club domestic league appearances and goals as of 19:35, 7 April 2012 (UTC)

Damián Leandro Casalinuovo (born 6 June 1987) is a retired Argentine professional footballer who played as a striker. Casalinuovo also has an Italian passport, due to descent.

== Career ==
Casalinuovo began his career with Velez Sarsfield, graduating through the youth ranks and featuring twice for the first team. After a year with Platense, Casalinuovo joined Scottish Premier League side Dundee United in 2009. United believed that there would be no transfer fee to pay, but a FIFA tribunal later ordered them to pay €400,000 (reduced to €230,000 on appeal). Casalinuovo moved on loan to Raith Rovers in the First Division, scoring on his début, in a 2-0 Fife derby win against Dunfermline Athletic. He also scored on his second appearance for the Rovers against Partick Thistle at Stark's Park before being recalled in mid-September. In his next game for United, Casalinuovo started his first match and also scored his first goal, netting the winner in the 3–2 victory against St Johnstone.

Damian signed for Hamilton Academical on 31 August 2010 for an undisclosed fee, on a two-year deal. On 11 April 2011, Casalinuovo was released by Hamilton, having made 19 appearances for them in the Scottish Premier League. On 6 January 2012 Damian rejoined Raith Rovers until the end of the season. After making eleven appearances and scoring three times he left the club.

After leaving Rovers, Casalinuovo announced his retirement after a back problem forced him to retire and has since moved back to his native Argentina to become an accountant.
