= Andis Shala =

Kosovar footballer

Personal information
- Date of birth: 15 November 1988 (age 37)
- Place of birth: Đakovica, Yugoslavia (modern day Kosovo)
- Height: 1.91 m (6 ft 3 in)
- Position: Forward

Youth career
- 2006–2007: Hannover 96

Senior career*
Years	Team	Apps	(Gls)
2007–2008	Hannover 96 II		
2008	VfR Mannheim	9	(2)
2008–2011	Dundee United	30	(1)
2011–2013	Hallescher FC	46	(7)
2013–2014	Carl Zeiss Jena	34	(8)
2014–2015	BFC Dynamo	23	(4)
2015–2018	SV Babelsberg 03	91	(45)
2018–2019	Rot-Weiß Erfurt	32	(14)
2019–2020	Kickers Offenbach	12	(3)
2020	Waldhof Mannheim	3	(0)
2020–2022	Chemnitzer FC	18	(2)
- * Club domestic league appearances and goals as of 10:41, 19 September 2022 (UTC)

Andis Shala (Croatian: Andis Šalja; born 15 November 1988) is a Kosovar footballer who most recently played as a forward for Chemnitzer FC.

== Club career ==
Having begun career in the youth team at Hannover 96, Shala joined VfR Mannheim in January 2008 on a short-term deal.

Shala joined Dundee United in pre-season for the 2008–09 season, with manager Craig Levein calling him a "decent prospect" and stated that he had "high hopes for him". Shala arrived in mid June 2008 with fellow new signing Michael McGovern.

He made his debut as a substitute in an August 2008 Scottish League Cup match. He made his league debut in February 2009, and with his first touch of the ball, set up Lee Wilkie to score the equalising goal in a 1–1 draw against Inverness Caledonian Thistle. He was released by Dundee United in the summer of 2011.

Following his release, Shala returned to Germany to sign for Hallescher FC. After earning promotion to the 3. Liga in the 2011–12 season, he left Halle to sign for Carl Zeiss Jena in January 2013. Eighteen months later he signed for BFC Dynamo.

He agreed the termination of his contract with Regionalliga Nordost side Chemnitzer FC in January 2022.

== International career ==
Shala is of Kosovar Albanian descent. In late December 2009, Shala was the subject of interest from the Albania national team, with team manager Josip Kuže confirming he was intending to watch the player. In an interview for the Albanian newspaper Sporti Shqiptar, Shala stated his willingness to play for Albania, and stated that if he never got called up for the squad, that he would not consider playing for any other country.

== Personal life ==
His father is former Croatia international Kujtim Shala.
