= Garry Kenneth =

Scottish association football player

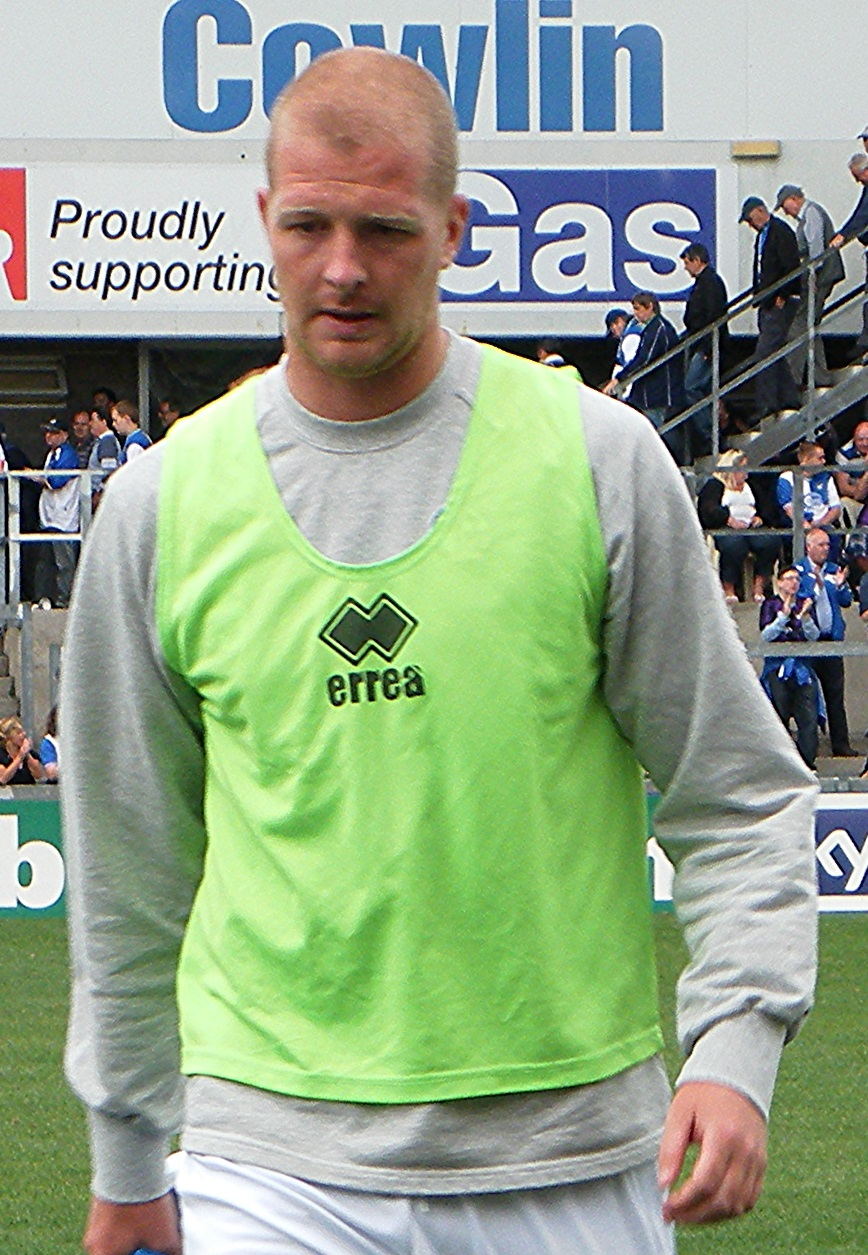
- Kenneth training with Bristol Rovers in 2013

Personal information
- Full name: Garry James Alexander Kenneth
- Date of birth: 21 June 1987 (age 39)
- Place of birth: Dundee, Scotland
- Height: 6 ft 4 in (1.93 m)
- Position: Centre back

Team information
- Current team: Lochee United

Youth career
- Fairmuir Boys Club
- 2003–2004: Dundee United

Senior career*
Years	Team	Apps	(Gls)
2004–2012	Dundee United	163	(6)
2007	→ Cowdenbeath (loan)	7	(0)
2012–2013	Bristol Rovers	18	(1)
2014	Brechin City	5	(0)
2014	Carnoustie Panmure		
2015	Adamstown Rosebud		
2015	Skonto Riga	7	(0)
2015–2016	Forfar Albion		
2016	Selkirk		
2016–	Douglas Amateurs		

International career^{‡}
2005–2007	Scotland U19	12	(1)
2007	Scotland U20	3	(0)
2007–2008	Scotland U21	8	(0)
2010	Scotland	2	(0)
- * Club domestic league appearances and goals as of 10:58, 7 December 2015 (UTC) ‡ National team caps and goals as of 10:58, 7 December 2015 (UTC)

Garry James Alexander Kenneth (born 21 June 1987) is a Scottish former footballer, who played as a centre back for Dundee United, Cowdenbeath, Bristol Rovers, Brechin City, Carnoustie Panmure, Adamstown Rosebud and Skonto Riga. He also represented Scotland twice at full international level.

== Club career ==
Kenneth, who was brought up in Dundee, played for Dundee United Social Club and St.Josephs, before he returned with a second spell at Dundee United Social Club.

Kenneth, who is a keen Dundee United supporter and came through the Jim McLean School of Excellence, made his debut for United in February 2005, playing in the 3–0 Scottish Cup win at Queen of the South. Playing in the remaining thirteen games of the season, Kenneth's introduction to league football saw eleven goals conceded in just four games. However, following the Cup semi-final win over Hibernian, his contribution helped United concede just four goals in the final six league games. Kenneth was part of the United team who lost the 2005 Scottish Cup Final against Celtic. Kenneth signed a new contract in October 2006, taking him to 2010. In March 2007, Kenneth moved to Cowdenbeath on loan for the remainder of the season, after losing his place in the United first team. Kenneth regained his place in the team in early 2008, playing in the League Cup final defeat to Rangers.

In mid-January 2010, Dundee United rejected a £75,000 bid from Blackpool for Kenneth, stating that the offer was "ridiculously small". On 29 January, and with the transfer window coming to a close, Blackpool manager Ian Holloway confirmed that the club had made a vastly improved offer for Kenneth. The offer believed to be in the region of £500,000, was rejected by Dundee United, who after a fantastic 2009–10 season, valued the player at around £2m. Kenneth helped Dundee United get to the 2010 Scottish Cup Final and started in The Terrors 3–0 win over Ross County. Kenneth stated in November 2011 that he would be leaving United at the end of the 2011–12 season, in the hope of earning a move to the Football League Championship.

Kenneth played as a trialist for Airdrie United in a closed doors friendly against Rangers in July 2012.

=== Bristol Rovers ===
At the end of July 2012, he signed a three-year deal with League Two side Bristol Rovers. He made his Bristol Rovers début in a 1–1 draw at Plymouth Argyle on 18 September 2012, playing the full 90 minutes of the match. He made his home debut on 22 September 2012 in a 1–1 draw to Fleetwood Town. He scored his first goal for Bristol Rovers on 6 October 2012, against Northampton Town, in a 3–1 win. After an injury-plagued 16 months, in December 2013 Bristol Rovers announced Kenneth had left the club by mutual consent.

=== Later career ===
On 12 February 2014, Kenneth signed for Scottish League One club Brechin City until the end of the season. On 21 August 2014, he signed for Junior club Carnoustie Panmure on a two-year deal.

On 11 January 2015, it was announced that Kenneth had signed for Australian club Adamstown Rosebud playing in the Northern NSW NPL for the 2015 season. He then joined Latvian club Skonto Riga in July 2015 before returning to junior football in Scotland, signing for Forfar Albion in November 2015.

On 15 February 2016, Kenneth signed a long-term contract with Lowland Football League side Selkirk. As of 2017, he was pursuing a career outside of football.

On 5 August 2018, Kenneth signed for Lochee United.

== International career ==
Kenneth was part of the Scotland under-19 team who lost in the final of the 2006 European Under-19 Football Championship. Kenneth also played two warm-up games for the Scotland under-20s as preparation for the 2007 FIFA U-20 World Cup, featuring again in May and July 2007. Kenneth made his début at under-21 level in the 3–2 defeat to Finland in September 2007, going on to win eight caps over the next twelve months.

He was selected in the full national team for the first time along with teammate Paul Dixon for the friendly with the Czech Republic. He made his debut for Scotland in August 2010, playing 90 mins against Sweden.

== Personal life ==
In 2018, Kenneth was working as an industrial machinery salesman whilst trying to return to football.

== Honours ==
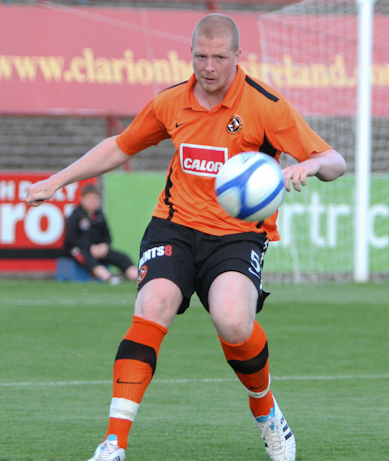
Kenneth playing for Dundee United in 2011

Dundee United

- Scottish Cup : 1

2005 (Runner-up), 2010

- Scottish League Cup

2008 (Runner-up)

Scotland U-19s

- European Under-19 Championship Runner-up: 1

2006

Personal

- Scottish Premier League Young Player of the Month: 1

March 2008
