= Craig Levein =

Scottish association football player

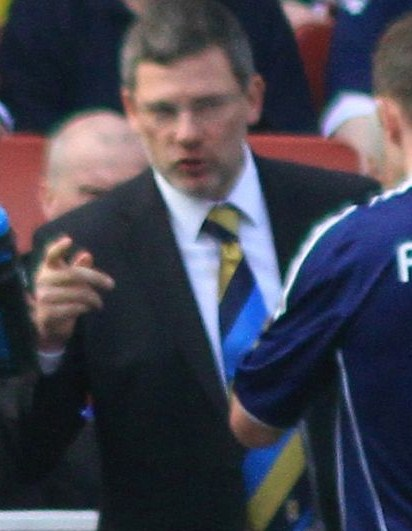
- Levein in 2012

Personal information
- Full name: Craig William Levein
- Date of birth: 22 October 1964 (age 62)
- Place of birth: Dunfermline, Scotland
- Height: 6 ft 0 in (1.83 m)
- Position: Defender

Youth career
- Lochore Welfare

Senior career*
Years	Team	Apps	(Gls)
1981–1983	Cowdenbeath	60	(0)
1983–1997	Heart of Midlothian	326	(15)
Total		386	(15)

International career
1990–1994	Scotland	16	(0)

Managerial career
- 1997–2000: Cowdenbeath
- 2000–2004: Heart of Midlothian
- 2004–2006: Leicester City
- 2006: Raith Rovers
- 2006–2009: Dundee United
- 2009–2012: Scotland
- 2017–2019: Heart of Midlothian
- 2023–2024: St Johnstone
- * Club domestic league appearances and goals

Craig William Levein (born 22 October 1964) is a Scottish professional football manager and former player who was most recently the manager of Scottish Premiership club St Johnstone.

During his playing career he played for Cowdenbeath and Heart of Midlothian, making over 300 league appearances for Hearts until he was forced to retire due to injury. He also won 16 caps for Scotland and was part of their 1990 FIFA World Cup squad.

After retiring as a player Levein became a manager, working at club level for Cowdenbeath, Heart of Midlothian, Leicester City, Raith Rovers and Dundee United. Levein was appointed Scotland manager in 2009, but he left this position after the team failed to win any of its first four matches in 2014 FIFA World Cup qualification. He returned to Hearts in 2014 as director of football, then served as their manager from August 2017 to October 2019. After a spell advising Brechin City, Levein was appointed St Johnstone manager in November 2023, before being relieved of his duties in September 2024.

== Playing career ==
=== Early career ===
Levein was born in Dunfermline and attended Inverkeithing High School, where he was in the football team alongside another future Scottish international footballer, Gordon Durie. He was a supporter of Raith Rovers. His early football career saw him turn out for Dalgety Bay, Leven Royals and Inverkeithing under-16s. At the age of 15, however, he gave up football for a year, only resuming when his brother, who played for junior club Lochore Welfare invited him to training there. Levein subsequently signed for Lochore and after trials with several senior clubs he finally joined Cowdenbeath in 1981. He quickly established himself in the first team and soon became a target for larger clubs.

=== Hearts ===
In 1983, he moved to Heart of Midlothian for a fee of £40,000 and soon found himself a regular place in their first team. Levein won the SPFA Young Player of the Year award in 1985 and 1986, becoming the first player to retain the title. In the latter season Hearts chased a league and cup double. Two goals in the last 10 minutes of the season by Albert Kidd gave Hearts their first league defeat in 31 games, which handed the league title to Celtic. Levein missed that game through illness. He returned to the Hearts team the following week in the 1986 Scottish Cup Final, which Hearts lost 3–0 to Aberdeen.

1986 brought further woe for the young Levein when he picked up a serious knee injury in a reserve team game against Hibernian. The injury was to change his life. He had a recurrence of the injury in 1988 when he collapsed unchallenged in a game against Rangers and spent a second year out of the game.

It was not just injuries that kept Levein from playing during his time at Hearts: he was given a 12-game ban after punching, and breaking the nose of, Hearts teammate Graeme Hogg during a pre-season friendly against Raith Rovers.

Levein was forced to retire from playing in 1997, due to another serious knee injury. He made 401 appearances for Hearts.

=== Scotland ===
He made his Scotland debut in March 1990, a 1–0 win against reigning world champions, Argentina, at Hampden Park and played well enough to earn a place in Scotland's 1990 World Cup squad. Levein won 16 caps for the Scotland national team.

== Coaching and managerial career ==
After being forced into retirement as a player, Levein had coaching positions at Hearts and at Livingston. In November 1997 he was appointed as manager of Cowdenbeath and turned a struggling team into one that could challenge for promotion. Cowdenbeath were promoted in 2001, but Levein had left in December 2000 to take over as manager at Hearts.

=== Hearts manager ===
His time in charge of Hearts was successful, where he guided them to third place in the SPL in two successive seasons and thus into European competition. He was the first manager to take Hearts into Europe in successive seasons since the 1960s.

=== Leicester City ===
His impressive record in Scotland caught the attention of Leicester City, who appointed Levein as manager on 29 October 2004. However, after a poor start to the 2005–06 season, which left the club third from bottom in the Championship relegation zone, he was sacked as manager on 25 January 2006.

=== Raith Rovers ===
Levein was appointed as manager of his boyhood heroes, Scottish Second Division club Raith Rovers, on 5 September 2006, on a non-contract basis. However, after Dundee United parted company with Craig Brewster, Levein left his non-contract role at Raith Rovers to take up the job at Tannadice.

=== Dundee United ===
He was unveiled to the press on 30 October 2006. Levein guided United to four successive home victories, earning him 'Manager of the Month' for November 2006, later repeating the award in March 2007 and again in October 2007. On 21 January 2008 he was appointed Director of Football at the club, giving him a seat on the Board of Directors in addition to his existing managerial responsibilities. In August 2008, he was fined £5000 by the SFA for accusing a referee (Mike McCurry) of bias after a game against Rangers.

During his tenure, United regularly finished in the top half of the Scottish Premier League. The club reached the 2008 Scottish League Cup Final, which United led twice before losing to Rangers on a penalty shootout. Levein signed a new contract with United in December 2008, but he left the job in December 2009 to become Scotland national football team manager. United went on to win the 2009–10 Scottish Cup under his successor Peter Houston, who had been Levein's assistant. Levein overhauled the club's youth system, which subsequently brought through players such as Ryan Gauld and John Souttar.

=== Scotland manager ===
On 23 December 2009, Levein left Dundee United to become the new Scotland manager. He agreed to a 5 1/2-year deal. Scotland won 1–0 in his first match in charge, a friendly against the Czech Republic, with the goal coming from Celtic captain Scott Brown. However, his second game in charge would not be as successful, with Scotland going down 3–0 to Sweden on 12 August 2010. This was also followed by a disappointing 0–0 draw with Lithuania and an unconvincing 2–1 victory over Liechtenstein in the first two Euro 2012 qualifying matches.

Levein dropped in-form striker Kenny Miller and played an ultra-defensive 4–6–0 against Czech Republic in their third game. The match ended in a 1–0 defeat, with Levein attracting criticism for his negative tactics. Levein later said that he had adopted the formation after seeing Russian club Rubin Kazan achieve a good result against FC Barcelona with that approach. He also conceded that he perhaps should not have done this without knowing the players well, early in his tenure as manager.

In the following game, against World and European champions Spain, Levein adopted a more conventional 4–5–1 formation with Miller in attack. Scotland lost 2–3 despite coming back from 0–2 down to draw level at 2–2. Scotland then beat Faroe Islands 3–0 in a friendly where Levein gave seven debuts due to 9 withdrawals from the initial squad. Scotland won the first two matches of the 2011 Nations Cup with ease, beating Northern Ireland 3–0 and Wales 3–1. The Scots lost 1–0 to the Republic of Ireland in their third game, meaning that the Republic won the tournament.

In order to reach the UEFA Euro 2012 qualifying play-offs, Scotland realistically needed to beat the Czech Republic in their next qualifier. The match ended in a 2–2 draw, after two late controversial penalty kick decisions by Dutch referee Kevin Blom both went against Scotland. 1–0 wins in the next two qualifiers against Lithuania and Liechtenstein kept their chances mathematically alive, but a 3–1 defeat by Spain coupled with the Czech Republic winning in Lithuania eliminated Scotland.

For the 2014 FIFA World Cup, Scotland were drawn into UEFA qualifying Group A with Belgium, Croatia, Macedonia, Serbia and Wales. Preparations started with a 1–1 draw in Slovenia, but the team suffered a 5–1 defeat by the United States in May. Scotland bounced back with a 3–1 friendly win against Australia in August. Levein attracted criticism for selecting Ian Black for that match, despite him playing in the fourth-tier Scottish Third Division. Levein had previously said that it would be "very difficult" for any player to go from playing in the Third Division to an international match, and had left out Lee Wallace for that reason. Black received a mixed reception when he appeared as a late substitute, with some sections of the crowd booing him.

Levein stated his belief that Scotland were capable of winning all of their qualifying games, but the first two matches ended in home draws against Serbia and Macedonia. Levein was again criticised for adopting negative tactics. Levein then recalled Steven Fletcher and Kris Commons, but Scotland fell to two away defeats against Wales and Belgium, which left the Scots bottom of Group A with only 2 points from 4 games. He was relieved of his duties on 5 November 2012, following talks with the Scottish Football Association.

=== Return to Hearts ===
Levein returned to Hearts in May 2014, as he was appointed director of football by new owner Ann Budge. In that role, Levein oversaw the appointments of Robbie Neilson and Ian Cathro as head coach of Hearts. Four weeks after Cathro was sacked in August 2017, Levein was appointed first team manager. He signed a three-year contract as manager, while also continuing as director of football.

Levein was sacked as Hearts manager and director of football on 31 October 2019, although he was retained in an advisory role until May 2020.

=== Brechin City ===
During the 2020–21 season Levein worked for BBC Scotland as a pundit. He joined Brechin City as an advisor to their board of directors in June 2021, shortly after their relegation to the Highland League.

=== St Johnstone ===
Levein returned to management in November 2023 with St Johnstone. However, he was sacked in September 2024, following a run of four consecutive losses.

== Career statistics ==
=== Club ===
Club performance			League		Cup		League Cup		Continental		Total	
Season	Club	League	Apps	Goals	Apps	Goals	Apps	Goals	Apps	Goals	Apps	Goals
Scotland			League		Scottish Cup		League Cup		Europe		Total	
1981–82	Cowdenbeath	Scottish Second Division	60	0	?		?		—		60+	0
1982–83	Cowdenbeath	Scottish Second Division	60	0	?		?		—		60+	0
1983–84	Cowdenbeath	Scottish Second Division	60	0	?		?		—		60+	0
1983–84	Heart of Midlothian	Scottish Premier Division	22	0	2	0	0	0	—		21	0
1984–85	Heart of Midlothian	Scottish Premier Division	36	1	4	0	5	1	2	0	47	2
1985–86	Heart of Midlothian	Scottish Premier Division	33	2	5	0	3	0	—		41	2
1986–87	Heart of Midlothian	Scottish Premier Division	12	0	0	0	1	0	2	0	15	0
1987–88	Heart of Midlothian	Scottish Premier Division	21	0	0	0	0	0	—		21	0
1988–89	Heart of Midlothian	Scottish Premier Division	9	0	2	0	0	0	2	0	13	0
1989–90	Heart of Midlothian	Scottish Premier Division	35	0	3	0	3	0	—		41	0
1990–91	Heart of Midlothian	Scottish Premier Division	33	4	0	0	3	0	4	0	40	4
1991–92	Heart of Midlothian	Scottish Premier Division	36	2	4	0	3	0	—		43	2
1992–93	Heart of Midlothian	Scottish Premier Division	37	3	3	0	3	0	3	1	46	4
1993–94	Heart of Midlothian	Scottish Premier Division	30	3	3	0	2	0	2	0	37	3
1994–95	Heart of Midlothian	Scottish Premier Division	24	0	4	0	2	0	—		30	0
1995–96	Heart of Midlothian	Scottish Premier Division	1	0	0	0	2	0	—		3	0
Total			329	15	30	0	27	1	15	1	401	17
Career total			389	15	30+	0	27+	1	15	1	461+	17

=== International appearances ===
Scotland national team
Year	Apps	Goals
1990	6	0
1991	2	0
1992	1	0
1993	3	0
1994	4	0
Total	16	0

=== Managerial record ===
As of match played 14 September 2024

Managerial record by team and tenure
Team	From	To	Record					Ref
Team	From	To	P	W	D	L	Win %	Ref
Cowdenbeath	November 1997	1 December 2000	127	46	26	55	36.22	
Heart of Midlothian	1 December 2000	29 October 2004	170	74	41	55	43.53	
Leicester City	29 October 2004	25 January 2006	72	20	26	26	27.78	
Raith Rovers	5 September 2006	30 October 2006	7	1	3	3	14.29	
Dundee United	30 October 2006	23 December 2009	137	55	40	42	40.15	
Scotland	23 December 2009	5 November 2012	24	10	5	9	41.67	
Heart of Midlothian	28 August 2017	31 October 2019	106	42	28	36	39.62	
St Johnstone	5 November 2023	17 September 2024	39	11	7	21	28.21	
Total			682	259	176	247	37.98	—

== Honours ==
=== Player ===
Hearts

- Scottish Cup runner-up: 1985–86
- Scottish PFA Young Player of the Year: 1985, 1986

=== Manager ===
Dundee United

- SPL Manager of the Month: November 2006, March 2007, October 2007, November 2009
- Scottish League Cup runner-up: 2007–08

Hearts

- SPL Manager of the Month: December 2001, April 2003
- Scottish Premiership Manager of the Month: August 2018
- Scottish Cup runner-up: 2018–19

== See also ==
- List of Scotland national football team captains
