= List of Scottish football transfers winter 2015–16 =

This is a list of Scottish football transfers featuring at least one 2015–16 Scottish Premiership club or one 2015–16 Scottish Championship club which were completed after the summer 2015 transfer window closed and before the end of the 2015–16 season.

== List ==
Date	Name	Moving from	Moving to	Fee
2 September 2015	Jamie Insall	Bromyard Town	Hibernian	Free
2 September 2015	Mustapha Dumbuya	Notts County	Partick Thistle	Free
2 September 2015	Jaison McGrath	Celtic	St Mirren	Free
2 September 2015	Omar Kader	Alloa Athletic	Forfar Athletic	Free
7 September 2015	Viktor Genev	St Mirren	Petrolul Ploiești	Free
9 September 2015	Danny Swanson	Coventry City	Heart of Midlothian	Free
11 September 2015	Adam Eckersley	Heart of Midlothian	Hibernian	Free
12 September 2015	Conrad Balatoni	Partick Thistle	Kilmarnock	Free
15 September 2015	Craig Samson	Kilmarnock	Motherwell	Free
15 September 2015	Simon Ferry	Dundee	Peterhead	Free
22 September 2015	Mark Ridgers	St Mirren	Kilmarnock	Loan
23 September 2015	Arnaud Djoum	Lech Poznań	Heart of Midlothian	Free
24 September 2015	Ryan Edwards	Reading	Partick Thistle	Free
24 September 2015	Marc McAusland	St Mirren	Dunfermline Athletic	Free
25 September 2015	Joe McGovern	Dundee United	East Fife	Loan
26 September 2015	Marc McCallum	Dundee United	Livingston	Loan
29 September 2015	Steven Saunders	Ross County	Dumbarton	Free
1 October 2015	Kieran MacDonald	Hamilton Academical	East Fife	Free
2 October 2015	Zaine Francis-Angol	Motherwell	Kidderminster Harriers	Free
3 October 2015	Scott Robertson	Botoșani	Raith Rovers	Free
6 October 2015	Alex Schalk	Go Ahead Eagles	Ross County	Free
16 October 2015	James Severn	Worcester City	Ross County	Free
22 October 2015	Carlton Cole	West Ham United	Celtic	Free
30 October 2015	Craig Reid	Motherwell	St Mirren	Loan
30 October 2015	Isaac Layne	Alloa Athletic	Brechin City	Loan
4 November 2015	Fraser Kerr	Motherwell	Cowdenbeath	Free
5 November 2015	Jahmal Howlett-Mundle	Heart of Midlothian	Montrose	Loan
6 November 2015	Jamie Insall	Hibernian	East Fife	Loan
10 November 2015	Mario Bilate	Dundee United	Den Bosch	Free
20 November 2015	Gavin Gunning	Oldham Athletic	Dundee United	Free
23 November 2015	Guy Demel	West Ham United	Dundee United	Free
27 November 2015	Florent Sinama Pongolle	Lausanne-Sport	Dundee United	Free
28 November 2015	Callum Crane	Hibernian	Berwick Rangers	Loan
18 December 2015	James McFadden	St Johnstone	Motherwell	Free
22 December 2015	Ryan Stevenson	Partick Thistle	Ayr United	Loan
23 December 2015	Chris Dagnall	Kerala Blasters	Hibernian	Free
23 December 2015	Jordan Moore	Dundee United	Limerick	Free
23 December 2015	Ola Adeyemo	Dundee United	Watford	Free
24 December 2015	Darren Hill	Hamilton Academical	Forfar Athletic	Free
29 December 2015	Eiji Kawashima	Standard Liège	Dundee United	Free
31 December 2015	Thomas Orr	Greenock Morton	East Stirlingshire	Loan
31 December 2015	Scott McKenna	Aberdeen	Alloa Athletic	Loan
31 December 2015	Harry Forrester	Doncaster Rovers	Rangers	Undisclosed
1 January 2016	Declan McManus	Fleetwood Town	Greenock Morton	Loan
3 January 2016	Maciej Gostomski	Lech Poznań	Rangers	Free
5 January 2016	Niklas Gunnarsson	Vålerenga	Hibernian	Loan
5 January 2016	Christopher Mandiangu	FC Eindhoven	Hamilton Academical	Free
5 January 2016	Willie Gibson	Dumbarton	Stranraer	Free
6 January 2016	Kenny Anderson	Heart of Midlothian	RKC Waalwijk	Free
6 January 2016	David Ferguson	Motherwell	Airdrieonians	Loan
6 January 2016	Dylan Mackin	Motherwell	Airdrieonians	Loan
7 January 2016	Darren O'Dea	Mumbai City	Dundee	Free
7 January 2016	Mark Fotheringham	Fulham	Livingston	Free
8 January 2016	Brad McKay	St Johnstone	Dunfermline Athletic	Loan
8 January 2016	Grant Adam	Greenock Morton	Cowdenbeath	Free
8 January 2016	Riku Riski	Rosenborg BK	Dundee United	Loan
8 January 2016	Sam Stanton	Hibernian	Livingston	Loan
9 January 2016	Alex Fisher	Torquay United	Inverness Caledonian Thistle	Free
11 January 2016	Andy Murdoch	Rangers	Queen of the South	Loan
12 January 2016	Louis Longridge	Hamilton Academical	Raith Rovers	Loan
12 January 2016	Marc McCallum	Dundee United	Livingston	Free
12 January 2016	Declan McDaid	Partick Thistle	Cowdenbeath	Loan
12 January 2016	Jordon Forster	Hibernian	Plymouth Argyle	Loan
13 January 2016	Conor McGrandles	Norwich City	Falkirk	Loan
13 January 2016	Hugo Faria	Livingston	Airdrieonians	Free
13 January 2016	Dani López	Inverness Caledonian Thistle	Arenas Club	Free
14 January 2016	Gordon Smith	Dumbarton	ECU Joondalup	Free
15 January 2016	Andy Ryan	Hamilton Academical	Forfar Athletic	Free
15 January 2016	Scott Gallacher	Heart of Midlothian	Alloa Athletic	Free
15 January 2016	Rocco Quinn	Ross County	St Mirren	Free
15 January 2016	Adam Collin	Rotherham United	Aberdeen	Loan
15 January 2016	Tom Walsh	Rangers	Dumbarton	Loan
17 January 2016	Erik Sviatchenko	FC Midtjylland	Celtic	£1.5 million
17 January 2016	Nathan Austin	East Fife	Falkirk	Undisclosed
17 January 2016	Nathan Austin	Falkirk	East Fife	Loan
19 January 2016	Anthony Stokes	Celtic	Hibernian	Loan
21 January 2016	Ryan Stevenson	Partick Thistle	Ayr United	Free
21 January 2016	Arturo Juan Pérez-Reverte	Córdoba	Dundee	Loan
21 January 2016	Evan Horne	Dundee United	Dunfermline Athletic	Free
22 January 2016	Kyle Knoyle	West Ham United	Dundee United	Loan
22 January 2016	Aidan Connolly	Dundee United	Raith Rovers	Free
22 January 2016	Kevin Thomson	Dundee	Hibernian	Free
24 January 2016	Otso Virtanen	IFK Mariehamn	Hibernian	Free
25 January 2016	Theo Robinson	Motherwell	Port Vale	Free
26 January 2016	Mitch Megginson	Raith Rovers	Alloa Athletic	Free
26 January 2016	Paul Quinn	Aberdeen	Ross County	Free
27 January 2016	Ross Millen	Livingston	Clyde	Free
27 January 2016	David Clarkson	Motherwell	St Mirren	Loan
27 January 2016	Ryan Blair	Falkirk	Swansea City	Undisclosed
27 January 2016	Dominique Malonga	Hibernian	Pro Vercelli	Undisclosed
28 January 2016	Charlie Telfer	Dundee United	Livingston	Loan
28 January 2016	Kevin McCann	Warriors	Falkirk	Free
28 January 2016	Billy King	Heart of Midlothian	Rangers	Loan
29 January 2016	Fraser Aird	Rangers	Vancouver Whitecaps	Loan
29 January 2016	Kler Heh	Sheffield United	Dumbarton	Loan
29 January 2016	Gary Irvine	Dundee	St Mirren	Free
29 January 2016	Alex Cooper	Falkirk	St Mirren	Free
29 January 2016	Lewis McLear	St Mirren	Stirling Albion	Loan
29 January 2016	Harry Panayiotou	Leicester City	Raith Rovers	Loan
30 January 2016	Myles Hippolyte	Livingston	Falkirk	Undisclosed
30 January 2016	Deniz Mehmet	Kayserispor	Falkirk	Free
30 January 2016	Osman Kakay	Queens Park Rangers	Livingston	Loan
1 February 2016	Colin Kazim-Richards	Feyenoord	Celtic	Undisclosed
1 February 2016	Antonio German	Kerala Blasters	Partick Thistle	Free
1 February 2016	Patrick Roberts	Manchester City	Celtic	Loan
1 February 2016	Nadir Ciftci	Celtic	Eskisehirspor	Loan
1 February 2016	Aidan Nesbitt	Celtic	Partick Thistle	Loan
1 February 2016	Don Cowie	Wigan Athletic	Heart of Midlothian	Free
1 February 2016	Abiola Dauda	Vitesse Arnhem	Heart of Midlothian	Loan
1 February 2016	Morgaro Gomis	Heart of Midlothian	Motherwell	Loan
1 February 2016	Michael O'Halloran	St Johnstone	Rangers	Undisclosed
1 February 2016	Chris Duggan	Partick Thistle	Queen's Park	Loan
1 February 2016	Scott McMann	Hamilton Academical	Clyde	Loan
1 February 2016	Euan Spark	Dundee United	Forfar Athletic	Loan
1 February 2016	Alex Tokarczyk	Falkirk	Montrose	Loan
1 February 2016	Lukas Culjak	Aberdeen	Brechin City	Loan
1 February 2016	Jamie Henry	Aberdeen	Arbroath	Loan
1 February 2016	Sam Dryden	Dundee	Elgin City	Loan
1 February 2016	Simon Church	MK Dons	Aberdeen	Loan
1 February 2016	Lee Hodson	MK Dons	Kilmarnock	Loan
1 February 2016	David Goodwillie	Aberdeen	Ross County	Loan
1 February 2016	Gary Dicker	Carlisle United	Kilmarnock	Free
1 February 2016	Christian Nade	Hamilton Academical	Dumbarton	Free
1 February 2016	Jack Breslin	Celtic	Annan Athletic	Loan
1 February 2016	Liam Hughes	Cambridge United	Inverness Caledonian Thistle	Free
1 February 2016	Ryan Williams	Brentford	Inverness Caledonian Thistle	Free
1 February 2016	John Souttar	Dundee United	Heart of Midlothian	Undisclosed
1 February 2016	Mekhi Leacock-McLeod	Wolverhampton Wanderers	Rangers	Free
1 February 2016	Spas Georgiev	Livingston	Albion Rovers	Loan
1 February 2016	Josh Mullin	Albion Rovers	Livingston	Undisclosed
2 February 2016	Craig Reid	Motherwell	Dunfermline Athletic	Free
2 February 2016	Ryan Finnie	Annan Athletic	Alloa Athletic	Free
3 February 2016	Danny Swanson	Heart of Midlothian	St Johnstone	Free
3 February 2016	Oumar Diaby	Levski Sofia	Hamilton Academical	Free
4 February 2016	Michael Doyle	Alloa Athletic	St Johnstone	Free
6 February 2016	Edward Ofere	Boluspor	Dundee United	Free
22 February 2016	Plamen Krachunov	Slavia Sofia	St Johnstone	Free
23 February 2016	Jordan Thompson	Rangers	Airdrieonians	Loan
10 March 2016	Perry Kitchen	D.C. United	Heart of Midlothian	Free
23 March 2016	Scott Smith	Dundee United	Forfar Athletic	Free
23 March 2016	Jamie Robson	Dundee United	Brechin City	Loan
23 March 2016	Conner Duthie	Hibernian	Dunfermline Athletic	Free
25 March 2016	Jordan Kirkpatrick	Dumbarton	Clyde	Loan
31 March 2016	Conrad Logan	Leicester City	Hibernian	Free
31 March 2016	Miles Addison	Peterborough United	Kilmarnock	Free
31 March 2016	Alex Henshall	Ipswich Town	Kilmarnock	Free
1 April 2016	Scott Robinson	Kilmarnock	Dunfermline Athletic	Free

== See also ==
- List of Scottish football transfers summer 2015
- List of Scottish football transfers summer 2016
