= List of Scottish football transfers winter 2014–15 =

This is a list of Scottish football transfers featuring at least one 2014–15 Scottish Premiership club or one 2014–15 Scottish Championship club which were completed after the end of the summer 2014 transfer window and before the end of the 2014–15 season.

== September 2014 – May 2015 ==
Date	Name	Moving from	Moving to	Fee
4 September 2014	John Guidetti	Manchester City	Celtic	Loan
5 September 2014	Owain Tudur Jones	Hibernian	Falkirk	Free
5 September 2014	Dominique Malonga	Cesena	Hibernian	Free
8 September 2014	David Clarkson	Bristol Rovers	Dundee	Free
9 September 2014	Darryl Westlake	Sheffield United	Kilmarnock	Free
11 September 2014	Miguel Pallardo	Levante	Heart of Midlothian	Free
12 September 2014	Marcus Fraser	Celtic	Cowdenbeath	Loan
20 September 2014	Leighton McIntosh	Dundee	Montrose	Free
27 September 2014	Chris Dilo	St Mirren	Stade Rennais	Free
27 September 2014	Lewis Toshney	Celtic	Ross County	Free
1 October 2014	James McFadden	Motherwell	St Johnstone	Free
7 October 2014	Ibra Sekajja	Crystal Palace	Inverness Caledonian Thistle	Free
9 October 2014	Martin Woods	Barnsley	Ross County	Free
13 October 2014	Frédéric Frans	Lierse	Partick Thistle	Free
13 October 2014	Marc Klok	Ross County	Cherno More Varna	Free
14 October 2014	Colin Marshall	Amicale	Cowdenbeath	Free
16 October 2014	Terry Dunfield	Oldham Athletic	Ross County	Free
16 October 2014	Jamie Reckord	Wolverhampton Wanderers	Ross County	Free
20 October 2014	Eric Djemba-Djemba	St Mirren	Chennaiyin FC	Free
27 October 2014	Arvid Schenk	VfL Wolfsburg II	Dundee	Free
28 October 2014	Melvin de Leeuw	Ross County	Unattached	Free
13 November 2014	Uros Celcer	Ross County	Unattached	Free
13 November 2014	Tim Dreesen	Ross County	Unattached	Free
20 November 2014	Adam Cummins	Motherwell	Ayr United	Loan
8 December 2014	Ross Docherty	Livingston	Airdrieonians	Free
19 December 2014	Craig Wighton	Dundee	Brechin City	Loan
2 January 2015	Craig Curran	Nuneaton Town	Ross County	Free
3 January 2015	Lewis Macleod	Rangers	Brentford	£1M
3 January 2015	Alex Harris	Hibernian	Dundee	Loan
3 January 2015	Martin Boyle	Dundee	Hibernian	Loan
3 January 2015	Aaron Muirhead	Partick Thistle	Falkirk	Free
3 January 2015	Mark Kerr	Queen of the South	Falkirk	Free
4 January 2015	Kostadin Gadzhalov	Dobrudzha Dobrich	Dundee	Free
4 January 2015	Lee Lynch	Limerick	Hamilton Academical	Free
4 January 2015	Simon Murray	Arbroath	Dundee United	£50,000
4 January 2015	Simon Murray	Dundee United	Arbroath	Loan
6 January 2015	Franck Dja Djédjé	Dinamo Minsk	Hibernian	Free
8 January 2015	Genero Zeefuik	Groningen	Heart of Midlothian	Loan
8 January 2015	Mark Millar	Peterhead	Queen of the South	Free
8 January 2015	John Baird	Queen of the South	Falkirk	Free
8 January 2015	Taylor Morgan	Ostersunds	Falkirk	Loan
9 January 2015	Nicky Riley	Dundee	Peterhead	Free
9 January 2015	Peter MacDonald	Dundee	Greenock Morton	Free
9 January 2015	Ross Caldwell	St Mirren	Greenock Morton	Free
12 January 2015	Jordi Balk	Ross County	FC Oss	Free
14 January 2015	Yoann Arquin	Ross County	St Mirren	Free
15 January 2015	Cameron Burgess	Fulham	Ross County	Loan
15 January 2015	Henri Anier	Erzgebirge Aue	Dundee United	Undisclosed
19 January 2015	Stephen Pearson	Kerala Blasters	Motherwell	Free
23 January 2015	James Marwood	St Mirren	Forest Green Rovers	Free
22 January 2015	Marcus Fraser	Celtic	Ross County	Free
23 January 2015	Ryan McGowan	Shandong Luneng Taishan	Dundee United	Free
23 January 2015	Beram Kayal	Celtic	Brighton & Hove Albion	Undisclosed
26 January 2015	Tomáš Černý	Ergotelis	Hibernian	Free
27 January 2015	Darvydas Šernas	Wigry Suwałki	Ross County	Free
27 January 2015	Donervon Daniels	West Bromwich Albion	Aberdeen	Loan
28 January 2015	Keith Watson	Dundee United	Hibernian	Loan
28 January 2015	Callum Booth	Hibernian	Partick Thistle	Loan
28 January 2015	Arvid Schenk	Dundee	Unattached	Free
29 January 2015	Ryan Finnie	Rangers	Partick Thistle	Free
29 January 2015	James Dayton	Oldham Athletic	St Mirren	Loan
30 January 2015	Lucas De Lima Tagliapietra	Milsami Orhei	Hamilton Academical	Free
30 January 2015	Billy McKay	Inverness Caledonian Thistle	Wigan Athletic	Undisclosed
30 January 2015	Stephen McGinn	Sheffield United	Dundee	Loan
30 January 2015	Jason Holt	Heart of Midlothian	Sheffield United	Loan
30 January 2015	Louis Laing	Nottingham Forest	Motherwell	Loan
30 January 2015	Anthony Straker	York City	Motherwell	Loan
30 January 2015	Ruben Palazuelos	Ermis Aradippou	Ross County	Free
30 January 2015	Raffaele De Vita	Cheltenham Town	Ross County	Free
2 February 2015	Nicolas Šumský	Dukla Banska Bystrica	Hamilton Academical	Free
2 February 2015	Kenny Anderson	RKC Waalwijk	Heart of Midlothian	Nominal
2 February 2015	Kenny McLean	St Mirren	Aberdeen	£300,000
2 February 2015	George Long	Sheffield United	Motherwell	Loan
2 February 2015	Ben Priest	Wolverhampton Wanderers	Dundee	Free
2 February 2015	Michael Brewster	FC United of Manchester	St Mirren	Free
2 February 2015	Paul Heffernan	Hibernian	Dundee	Free
2 February 2015	Stephen McGinn	Sheffield United	Dundee	Free
2 February 2015	Dylan Carreiro	Dundee	Arbroath	Loan
2 February 2015	Philip Roberts	Dundee	Alloa Athletic	Loan
2 February 2015	Paul Dixon	Huddersfield Town	Dundee United	Free
2 February 2015	Emmanuel Sonupe	Tottenham Hotspur	St Mirren	Loan
2 February 2015	Michael Duffy	Derry City	Celtic	Undisclosed
2 February 2015	Arnold Peralta	Rangers	CD Olimpia	Free
2 February 2015	Filip Twardzik	Celtic	Bolton Wanderers	Free
2 February 2015	Lyle Taylor	Scunthorpe United	Partick Thistle	Loan
2 February 2015	Ola Adeyemo	Dundee United	East Fife	Loan
2 February 2015	Fraser Fyvie	Wigan Athletic	Hibernian	Free
2 February 2015	Conor Grant	Everton	Motherwell	Loan
2 February 2015	Nathan Thomas	Plymouth Argyle	Motherwell	Free
2 February 2015	Gael Bigirimana	Newcastle United	Rangers	Loan
2 February 2015	Kevin Mbabu	Newcastle United	Rangers	Loan
2 February 2015	Shane Ferguson	Newcastle United	Rangers	Loan
2 February 2015	Haris Vuckic	Newcastle United	Rangers	Loan
2 February 2015	Remie Streete	Newcastle United	Rangers	Loan
2 February 2015	Gary Mackay-Steven	Dundee United	Celtic	£250,000
2 February 2015	Stuart Armstrong	Dundee United	Celtic	£1.6M
2 February 2015	Marvin Johnson	Kidderminster Harriers	Motherwell	Free
2 February 2015	Danny Swanson	Coventry City	St Johnstone	Loan
2 February 2015	Robbie Muirhead	Kilmarnock	Dundee United	£150,000
2 February 2015	Jordan Moore	Dundee United	Queen's Park	Loan
2 February 2015	Declan McManus	Aberdeen	Greenock Morton	Loan
2 February 2015	Tony Andreu	Hamilton Academical	Norwich City	£1M
2 February 2015	Lewis Toshney	Ross County	Cowdenbeath	Free
2 February 2015	Darren Maatsen	Ross County	Den Bosch	Free
4 February 2015	David Robertson	Livingston	Ayr United	Free
4 February 2015	Kieran Sadlier	West Ham United	St Mirren	Free
6 February 2015	Nigel Hasselbaink	Veria	Hamilton Academical	Free
12 February 2015	Gary McDonald	St Johnstone	Peterhead	Free
13 February 2015	Mark Wilson	Dundee United	Dumbarton	Free
13 February 2015	Abdoulaye Meite	OFI	Ross County	Free
14 February 2015	Nathan Eccleston	Partick Thistle	Kilmarnock	Free
18 February 2015	Mickael Antoine-Curier	Hamilton Academical	Burton Albion	Free
20 February 2015	Alan Gow	Exeter City	St Mirren	Free
26 February 2015	Viktor Genev	Spartak Semey	St Mirren	Free
26 February 2015	Scott McDonald	Millwall	Motherwell	Free
28 February 2015	Edward Ofere	Sogndal Fotball	Inverness Caledonian Thistle	Free
5 March 2015	Tarmo Kink	Kaposvári Rákóczi	Inverness Caledonian Thistle	Free
11 March 2015	Andrew Driver	Houston Dynamo	Aberdeen	Free

== See also ==
- List of Scottish football transfers summer 2014
- List of Scottish football transfers summer 2015
