= List of Scottish football transfers summer 2014 =

This is a list of Scottish football transfers featuring at least one 2014–15 Scottish Premiership club or one 2014–15 Scottish Championship club which were completed during the summer 2014 transfer window. The summer window closed at 23:00 BST on Monday 1 September 2014.

== List ==
Date	Name	Moving from	Moving to	Fee
8 May 2014	Philip Roberts	Falkirk	Dundee	Free
9 May 2014	Andy Kirk	Alloa Athletic	Unattached	Free
14 May 2014	Michal Habai	Livingston	FK Rača	Free
14 May 2014	Nejc Mevlja	Livingston	Pandurii Târgu Jiu	Free
14 May 2014	Mike Mampuya	Livingston	Unattached	Free
15 May 2014	Nicky Weaver	Aberdeen	Unattached	Free
15 May 2014	Derek Riordan	Alloa Athletic	Brechin City	Free
19 May 2014	Marc McNulty	Livingston	Sheffield United	Undisclosed
20 May 2014	John Baird	Raith Rovers	Queen of the South	Free
21 May 2014	Joe Cardle	Raith Rovers	Ross County	Free
21 May 2014	Josh Law	Alfreton Town	Motherwell	Free
22 May 2014	Reece Donaldson	Raith Rovers	Peterhead	Free
22 May 2014	Jamie Watson	Raith Rovers	Unattached	Free
22 May 2014	Tim Clancy	St Johnstone	Shamrock Rovers	Free
23 May 2014	Dan Twardzik	Dundee	Motherwell	Free
31 May 2014	John Gibson	Dundee	Alloa Athletic	Free
23 May 2014	Matthew Cooper	Inverness Caledonian Thistle	Elgin City	Free
23 May 2014	Gordon Finlayson	Ross County	Elgin City	Free
23 May 2014	Chris Hegarty	Rangers	Linfield	Free
26 May 2014	Sean Murdoch	Hibernian	Rochester Rhinos	Free
27 May 2014	Shaleum Logan	Brentford	Aberdeen	Free
28 May 2014	Scott Brown	Cheltenham Town	Aberdeen	Free
28 May 2014	Ash Taylor	Tranmere Rovers	Aberdeen	Free
30 May 2014	Marc McKenzie	Cowdenbeath	Albion Rovers	Free
30 May 2014	David Weatherston	Stirling Albion	Alloa Athletic	Free
30 May 2014	Mark Docherty	Stranraer	Alloa Athletic	Free
30 May 2014	Kevin Thomson	Hibernian	Dundee	Free
30 May 2014	James McPake	Hibernian	Dundee	Free
30 May 2014	Scott Bain	Alloa Athletic	Dundee	Free
2 June 2014	Jamie Hamill	Heart of Midlothian	Kilmarnock	Free
2 June 2014	Charlie Telfer	Rangers	Dundee United	£170,000 compensation
2 June 2014	Martin Scott	Livingston	Raith Rovers	Free
4 June 2014	Kenny Miller	Vancouver Whitecaps FC	Rangers	Free
4 June 2014	James Collins	Hibernian	Shrewsbury Town	Undisclosed
4 June 2014	Aaron Taylor-Sinclair	Partick Thistle	Wigan Athletic	Free
5 June 2014	Caolan McAleer	Partick Thistle	East Fife	Free
6 June 2014	Mark Ridgers	Heart of Midlothian	St Mirren	Free
6 June 2014	Lewis Kidd	Celtic	Queen of the South	Free
6 June 2014	Dylan McGowan	Heart of Midlothian	Adelaide United	Free
7 June 2014	Simon Ferry	Portsmouth	Dundee	Free
7 June 2014	Jake Jervis	Portsmouth	Ross County	Free
7 June 2014	Dougie Imrie	Greenock Morton	Hamilton Academical	Free
9 June 2014	Michael McGovern	Falkirk	Hamilton Academical	Free
9 June 2014	Kieran MacDonald	Clyde	Hamilton Academical	Free
10 June 2014	Stephen Hughes	Dundee	Unattached	Free
10 June 2014	Matt Lockwood	Dundee	Sutton United	Free
10 June 2014	Darren Young	Alloa Athletic	Albion Rovers	Free
11 June 2014	Ryan Stevenson	Heart of Midlothian	Partick Thistle	Free
11 June 2014	David Robertson	Greenock Morton	Livingston	Free
11 June 2014	Kevin Cuthbert	Hamilton Academical	Raith Rovers	Free
11 June 2014	Danny Redmond	Wigan Athletic	Hamilton Academical	Free
11 June 2014	Darren McGregor	St Mirren	Rangers	Free
12 June 2014	Blair Spittal	Queen's Park	Dundee United	Free
12 June 2014	Morgaro Gomis	Dundee United	Heart of Midlothian	Free
12 June 2014	Gavin Gunning	Dundee United	Birmingham City	Free
13 June 2014	Michael Miller	Celtic	Greenock Morton	Free
13 June 2014	James Keatings	Hamilton Academical	Heart of Midlothian	Free
13 June 2014	Liam Boyce	Cliftonville	Ross County	Free
13 June 2014	Craig Barr	Airdrieonians	Raith Rovers	Free
13 June 2014	Scott Gray	St Johnstone	Airdrieonians	Free
16 June 2014	Shaun Hutchinson	Motherwell	Fulham	Free
16 June 2014	Lionel Ainsworth	Rotherham United	Motherwell	Free
16 June 2014	Soufian El Hassnaoui	Sparta Rotterdam	Heart of Midlothian	Free
16 June 2014	Lee Kilday	Hamilton Academical	Greenock Morton	Free
17 June 2014	Antonio Reguero	Kilmarnock	Ross County	Free
17 June 2014	Callum Morris	Dunfermline Athletic	Dundee United	Free
17 June 2014	Christian Nadé	Dundee	Raith Rovers	Free
17 June 2014	Michael Fraser	Ross County	Elgin City	Free
18 June 2014	Scott Vernon	Aberdeen	Shrewsbury Town	Free
18 June 2014	Jamie Stevenson	Cowdenbeath	Peterhead	Free
19 June 2014	Henri Anier	Motherwell	Erzgebirge Aue	Undisclosed
19 June 2014	Kane Hemmings	Cowdenbeath	Barnsley	Free
20 June 2014	Calvin Zola	Aberdeen	Stevenage	Free
20 June 2014	Paul McGinn	Dumbarton	Dundee	Free
20 June 2014	Paul McGowan	St Mirren	Dundee	Free
21 June 2014	Andy Little	Rangers	Preston North End	Free
22 June 2014	Scott Taggart	Greenock Morton	Dumbarton	Free
23 June 2014	Neil Alexander	Crystal Palace	Heart of Midlothian	Free
24 June 2014	Conor Pepper	Inverness Caledonian Thistle	Greenock Morton	Free
25 June 2014	David van Zanten	St Mirren	Dumbarton	Free
24 June 2014	Rory McKeown	Kilmarnock	Raith Rovers	Free
24 June 2014	Mark Stewart	Derry City	Raith Rovers	Free
25 June 2014	Derek Young	Queen of the South	Forfar Athletic	Free
26 June 2014	James Marwood	Gateshead	St Mirren	Free
26 June 2014	Alim Ozturk	Trabzonspor	Heart of Midlothian	Free
26 June 2014	James Fowler	Kilmarnock	Queen of the South	Free
26 June 2014	Fraser Mullen	Raith Rovers	East Fife	Free
26 June 2014	Greig Spence	Raith Rovers	Alloa Athletic	Free
27 June 2014	Kris Boyd	Kilmarnock	Rangers	Free
28 June 2014	Gordon Smith	Raith Rovers	Stirling Albion	Free
28 June 2014	Steven Doris	Dundee	Stirling Albion	Free
30 June 2014	Gary Harkins	St Mirren	Dundee	Free
30 June 2014	Chris Iwelumo	St Johnstone	Chester	Free
30 June 2014	Paul Cairney	Hibernian	Kilmarnock	Free
30 June 2014	Ryan McGivern	Hibernian	Port Vale	Free
30 June 2014	Stephen Kingsley	Falkirk	Swansea City	Undisclosed
1 July 2014	Lee Miller	Carlisle United	Kilmarnock	Free
1 July 2014	Sean Clohessy	Kilmarnock	Colchester United	Free
1 July 2014	Ben Gordon	Ross County	Colchester United	Free
2 July 2014	Ryan Gauld	Dundee United	Sporting Lisbon	Undisclosed
2 July 2014	Ellis Plummer	Manchester City	St Mirren	Loan
3 July 2014	Craig Gordon	Sunderland	Celtic	Free
3 July 2014	Jamie MacDonald	Heart of Midlothian	Falkirk	Free
3 July 2014	Alan Maybury	Hibernian	Falkirk	Free
3 July 2014	Tom Taiwo	Hibernian	Falkirk	Free
3 July 2014	Alex Cooper	Ross County	Falkirk	Free
3 July 2014	Peter Grant	Norwich City	Falkirk	Free
3 July 2014	Dale Hilson	Dundee United	Forfar Athletic	Free
4 July 2014	Lee Mair	Partick Thistle	Dumbarton	Free
4 July 2014	Bradley Donaldson	Hibernian	Livingston	Free
4 July 2014	Declan Gallagher	Dundee	Livingston	Free
4 July 2014	Rob Ogleby	Wrexham	Livingston	Free
4 July 2014	Jordan White	Stirling Albion	Livingston	Free
4 July 2014	Michael McKenna	Musselburgh Athletic	Livingston	Free
4 July 2014	Andrew Barrowman	Livingston	Greenock Morton	Free
7 July 2014	David Goodwillie	Blackburn Rovers	Aberdeen	Free
7 July 2014	Ryan Scully	Partick Thistle	Dunfermline Athletic	Loan
7 July 2014	David Gold	Hibernian	Berwick Rangers	Free
8 July 2014	David Gray	Burton Albion	Hibernian	Free
11 July 2014	Mark Connolly	Crawley Town	Kilmarnock	Free
11 July 2014	Grant Adam	Airdrieonians	Dundee	Free
11 July 2014	Marius Zaliukas	Leeds United	Rangers	Free
11 July 2014	Darren Hill	Forfar Athletic	Hamilton Academical	Undisclosed
11 July 2014	Myles Hippolyte	Unattached	Livingston	Free
11 July 2014	Gary Glen	Ross County	Livingston	Free
11 July 2014	Scott Smith	Dumbarton	East Fife	Free
11 July 2014	Ryan Conroy	Dundee	Raith Rovers	Free
14 July 2014	Ross Caldwell	Hibernian	St Mirren	Free
14 July 2014	Jamie Reid	Dundee	Stenhousemuir	Loan
14 July 2014	Jarosław Fojut	Tromsø	Dundee United	Free
14 July 2014	Farid El Alagui	Brentford	Hibernian	Free
16 July 2014	Josh Magennis	Aberdeen	Kilmarnock	Free
16 July 2014	Tope Obadeyi	Bury	Kilmarnock	Free
17 July 2014	Prince Buaben	Carlisle United	Heart of Midlothian	Free
18 July 2014	Tim Dreesen	Fortuna Sittard	Ross County	Free
18 July 2014	Jordi Balk	Utrecht	Ross County	Free
18 July 2014	Ben Frempah	Leicester City	Ross County	Free
18 July 2014	Scott Gallacher	Rangers	Heart of Midlothian	Free
19 July 2014	Mario Bilate	Sparta Rotterdam	Dundee United	Free
19 July 2014	Ross Perry	Rangers	Raith Rovers	Free
19 July 2014	Liam Buchanan	East Fife	Alloa Athletic	Free
21 July 2014	Osman Sow	Crystal Palace	Heart of Midlothian	Free
21 July 2014	Luka Tankulić	Fortuna Düsseldorf	Dundee	Free
21 July 2014	Thomas Konrad	Eintracht Trier	Dundee	Free
21 July 2014	Jim Fenlon	AFC Wimbledon	Ross County	Free
21 July 2014	Jeffrey Monakana	Brighton & Hove Albion	Aberdeen	Loan
21 July 2014	William Gros	Kilmarnock	Oldham Athletic	Free
22 July 2014	Evangelos Ikonomou	Ross County	Doxa Katokopias	Free
23 July 2014	Abdul Osman	Crewe Alexandra	Partick Thistle	Free
23 July 2014	Adam Asghar	Motherwell	Alloa Athletic	Free
23 July 2014	Archie Campbell	Greenock Morton	Dumbarton	Free
24 July 2014	Scott Allan	West Bromwich Albion	Hibernian	Free
24 July 2014	Robbie Thomson	Rochdale	Cowdenbeath	Free
24 July 2014	James Creaney	Alloa Athletic	Stirling Albion	Free
25 July 2014	Jeroen Tesselaar	Kilmarnock	St Mirren	Free
25 July 2014	Craig Sutherland	Queen's Park	Cowdenbeath	Free
28 July 2014	Mark Oxley	Hull City	Hibernian	Loan
28 July 2014	Jo Inge Berget	Cardiff City	Celtic	Loan
28 July 2014	Tony Watt	Celtic	Standard Liège	£1.2 million
29 July 2014	Conor Townsend	Hull City	Dundee United	Loan
29 July 2014	Andrew Robertson	Dundee United	Hull City	£2.85 million
30 July 2014	Denny Johnstone	Celtic	Birmingham City	Compensation
30 July 2014	Callum Ball	Derby County	St Mirren	Free
31 July 2014	Michał Szromnik	Arka Gdynia	Dundee United	Undisclosed
31 July 2014	Paul Grant	Hibernian	Livingston	Free
31 July 2014	Nigel Hasselbaink	St Johnstone	Veria	Free
1 August 2014	Willie Robertson	Alloa Athletic	Stirling Albion	Free
1 August 2014	Dean Horribine	Hibernian	Berwick Rangers	Free
4 August 2014	Danny Rogers	Aberdeen	Dumbarton	Loan
5 August 2014	Ben Williams	Hibernian	Bradford City	Free
6 August 2014	Filip Kiss	Cardiff City	Ross County	Loan
6 August 2014	Uros Celcer	Parma	Ross County	Free
6 August 2014	Rosario Latouchent	Caen	Ross County	Free
7 August 2014	Euan Smith	Hibernian	Kilmarnock	Free
8 August 2014	Matthew Kennedy	Everton	Hibernian	Loan
8 August 2014	Adam Morgan	Yeovil Town	St Johnstone	Loan
8 August 2014	Declan McManus	Aberdeen	Greenock Morton	Loan
9 August 2014	Chris Chantler	Carlisle United	Kilmarnock	Free
9 August 2014	Stevie May	St Johnstone	Sheffield Wednesday	£800,000
9 August 2014	Fraser Forster	Celtic	Southampton	£10,000,000
9 August 2014	Lewis Horner	Blyth Spartans	Inverness Caledonian Thistle	Free
11 August 2014	Danny Seaborne	Coventry City	Partick Thistle	Free
11 August 2014	Aleksandar Tonev	Aston Villa	Celtic	Loan
12 August 2014	Jason Denayer	Manchester City	Celtic	Loan
14 August 2014	Kyle Wilkie	Livingston	Nairn County	Free
14 August 2014	Henrik Ojamaa	Legia Warsaw	Motherwell	Loan
15 August 2014	Stuart Kettlewell	Ross County	Brora Rangers	Free
15 August 2014	Mark O'Brien	Derby County	Motherwell	Loan
15 August 2014	Michael Ngoo	Liverpool	Kilmarnock	Free
15 August 2014	Mark Millar	Dundee United	Peterhead	Free
15 August 2014	Lee Hollis	Motherwell	Heart of Midlothian	Free
15 August 2014	Patrick Cregg	St Johnstone	Shamrock Rovers	Free
19 August 2014	Craig Beattie	Dundee	Zebbug Rangers	Free
19 August 2014	Adam Drury	Manchester City	St Mirren	Loan
21 August 2014	Simon Lappin	Cardiff City	St Johnstone	Free
22 August 2014	Isaac Osbourne	Partick Thistle	St Mirren	Free
22 August 2014	Gabriel Piccolo	Partick Thistle	Unattached	Free
22 August 2014	Ben Richards-Everton	Tamworth	Partick Thistle	Free
22 August 2014	Adam Eckersley	AGF Aarhus	Heart of Midlothian	Free
22 August 2014	Georgios Samaras	Celtic	West Bromwich Albion	Free
25 August 2014	Lee Robinson	Raith Rovers	Rangers	Free
26 August 2014	Dylan Carreiro	Queens Park Rangers	Dundee	Free
26 August 2014	Kudus Oyenuga	Dundee United	Cowdenbeath	Loan
26 August 2014	Liam Fontaine	Bristol City	Hibernian	Free
26 August 2014	Michael Nelson	Hibernian	Cambridge United	Free
27 August 2014	Mubarak Wakaso	Rubin Kazan	Celtic	Loan
27 August 2014	Conor McGrandles	Falkirk	Norwich City	Undisclosed
27 August 2014	Kieran MacDonald	Hamilton Academical	Dumbarton	Loan
28 August 2014	Brian Graham	Dundee United	St Johnstone	Loan
29 August 2014	Jake Carroll	Huddersfield Town	Partick Thistle	Loan
29 August 2014	Chris Kane	St Johnstone	Dumbarton	Loan
29 August 2014	Stephen O'Donnell	Dundee	Clyde	Free
1 September 2014	Dylan McGeouch	Celtic	Hibernian	Loan
1 September 2014	Jake Sinclair	Southampton	Hibernian	Loan
1 September 2014	Nathan Eccleston	Blackpool	Partick Thistle	Free
1 September 2014	Hólmbert Friðjónsson	Celtic	Brondby	Loan
1 September 2014	Gary Oliver	Heart of Midlothian	Stenhousemuir	Loan
1 September 2014	Lee Hollis	Heart of Midlothian	Unattached	Free
1 September 2014	Kyle Benedictus	Dundee	Alloa Athletic	Loan
1 September 2014	Joe Shaughnessy	Aberdeen	Falkirk	Loan
1 September 2014	David Smith	Heart of Midlothian	Falkirk	Free
1 September 2014	Michael Gardyne	Dundee United	Ross County	Loan
1 September 2014	Darren Barr	Kilmarnock	Ross County	Free
1 September 2014	Jackson Irvine	Celtic	Ross County	Loan
1 September 2014	Teemu Pukki	Celtic	Brondby	Loan
1 September 2014	Amido Balde	Celtic	Waasland Beveren	Loan
1 September 2014	Stefan Scepovic	Sporting Gijon	Celtic	£2.3 million
1 September 2014	Pat Scullion	Clyde	Cowdenbeath	Free
1 September 2014	Anthony Higgins	Airdrieonians	Cowdenbeath	Free
1 September 2014	Calum Gallagher	Rangers	Cowdenbeath	Loan
1 September 2014	Robbie Crawford	Rangers	Greenock Morton	Loan
1 September 2014	Luca Gasparotto	Rangers	Airdrieonians	Loan
1 September 2014	Danny Stoney	Rangers	Stranraer	Loan
1 September 2014	Tom Walsh	Rangers	Stenhousemuir	Loan
1 September 2014	Craig Halkett	Rangers	Clyde	Loan
1 September 2014	Barrie McKay	Rangers	Raith Rovers	Loan

== See also ==
- List of Scottish football transfers winter 2013–14
- List of Scottish football transfers winter 2014–15
