= 2014–15 Hamilton Academical F.C. season =

Hamilton Academical
2014–15 season
- Chairman: Les Gray
- Manager: Alex Neil (until 9 January); Martin Canning (player-manager)
- Stadium: New Douglas Park
- Premiership: Seventh place
- League Cup: Quarter-finals
- Scottish Cup: Fourth round
- Top goalscorer: League: Tony Andreu (12); All: Tony Andreu (13)
- Highest home attendance: 6,007 vs. Celtic, Premiership, 17 January 2015
- Lowest home attendance: 694 vs. Alloa Athletic, League Cup, 26 August 2014
Home colours	Away colours

The 2014–15 season was Hamilton Academical's first season in the top flight of Scottish football since 2010–11 season, and their first in the newly established Scottish Premiership having been promoted from the 2013–14 Scottish Championship through the Play-offs. Hamilton also competed in the League Cup and the Scottish Cup.

== Summary ==
=== Management ===
The club began the 2014–15 season under the management of Alex Neil. On 9 January 2015, Neil left to become the new manager of, at the time, English Championship side Norwich City. Martin Canning was appointed Caretaker Player-manager, and was later on 23 January 2015 officially appointed Player-manager. With top goalscorer Tony Andreu also leaving, the club suffered with the sudden departures and Canning had to wait 14 matches for his first victory as manager, coming on 24 April 2015 in the Lanarkshire derby at home to Motherwell.

== Results and fixtures ==
Win Draw Loss Postponed

=== Pre-season ===
9 July 2014 Friendly	Hamilton Academical	1–0	Hearts	New Douglas Park, Hamilton
19:45	Gillespie 90+1'	Evening News Report; Daily Record Report; Scotsman Report		Attendance: 883; Referee: Andrew Dallas

15 July 2014 Friendly	Hamilton Academical	3–1	Dumbarton	New Douglas Park, Hamilton
19:45	Antoine-Curier,,	Report	Kirkpatrick

19 July 2014 Friendly	East Fife	1–0	Hamilton Academical	Bayview Stadium
15:00	Campbell	Report

22 July 2014 Friendly	Whitby Town	0–3	Hamilton Academical	Turnbull Ground
19:45		Report	Crawford 11'; Scotland 68'; Ryan 81'	Attendance: 271

24 July 2014 Friendly	Spennymoor Town	0–5	Hamilton Academical	The Brewery Field
19:15			Antoine-Curier,, Brophy; Redmond	Attendance: 290

26 July 2014 Friendly	Shildon	1–3	Hamilton Academical	Dean Street
15:00	Paul Connor 29'	Report	Scotland 44' (pen.); Redmond 77'; Antoine-Curier 84' (pen.)

=== Scottish Premiership ===
9 August 2014 1	Hamilton Academical	0–2	Inverness CT	New Douglas Park, Hamilton
15:00		BBC accies	McKay 10'; Christie 25'	Attendance: 1,622; Referee: Don Robertson

13 August 2014 2	St Mirren	0–2	Hamilton Academical	St Mirren Park, Paisley
19:45		BBC accies	Crawford 19', 51'	Attendance: 3,635; Referee: Alan Muir

16 August 2014 3	Hamilton Academical	1–0	St Johnstone	New Douglas Park, Hamilton
15:00	MacKinnon 16'	BBC accies		Attendance: 1,577; Referee: Bobby Madden

23 August 2014 4	Partick Thistle	1–2	Hamilton Academical	Firhill Stadium, Glasgow
15:00	Higginbotham 16'	BBC accies	Andreu 87'; Scotland 90'	Attendance: 3,578; Referee: Kevin Clancy

30 August 2014 5	Hamilton Academical	4–0	Ross County	New Douglas Park, Hamilton
15:00	Canning 47'; Antoine-Curier 56' (pen.), 63' (pen.); Scotland 90'	BBC accies	Celcer (red card) 62'	Attendance: 2,684; Referee: Willie Collum

13 September 2014 6	Dundee United	2–2	Hamilton Academical	Tannadice Park, Dundee
15:00	Ciftci 16' (red card) 41'; Fojut 45'	BBC accies	Antoine-Curier 28'; MacKinnon (yellow card) 26' (yellow-red card) 30'; Andreu 34'	Attendance: 7,109; Referee: John Beaton

20 September 2014 7	Hamilton Academical	0–0	Kilmarnock	New Douglas Park, Hamilton
15:00		BBC accies		Attendance: 2,604; Referee: Kevin Clancy

27 September 2014 8	Motherwell	0–4	Hamilton Academical	Fir Park, Motherwell
15:00		BBC accies	Andreu 34'; Crawford 45', 90'; Antoine-Curier 63' (pen.)	Attendance: 4,125; Referee: Willie Collum

5 October 2014 9	Celtic	0–1	Hamilton Academical	Celtic Park, Glasgow
		BBC accies	Crawford 49'	Attendance: 42,412; Referee: Steven McLean

17 October 2014 10	Hamilton Academical	3–0	Aberdeen	New Douglas Park, Hamilton
19:45	Andreu 15', 53'; Antoine-Curier 90'	BBC accies		Attendance: 4,093; Referee: Clancy

25 October 2014 11	Dundee	2–0	Hamilton Academical	Dens Park, Dundee
15:00	Clarkson 69'; Stewart 73'	BBC accies		Attendance: 6,035; Referee: John Beaton

1 November 2014 12	Hamilton Academical	3–3	Partick Thistle	New Douglas Park, Hamilton
15:00	MacKinnon 22'; Redmond 23'Andreu 90'	BBC accies	McMillan 32'; Craigen 68'Elliott 72'	Attendance: 2,855; Referee: Brian Colvin

8 November 2014 13	Inverness CT	4–2	Hamilton Academical	Caledonian Stadium, Inverness
15:00	McKay 25', 68'; Warren 59'; Vincent 78'	BBC accies	Andreu 17', 72'	Attendance: 3,022; Referee: Collum

22 November 2014 14	Hamilton Academical	3–0	St Mirren	New Douglas Park, Hamilton
15:00	Andreu 40'; Antoine-Curier 67'; Crawford 74'	BBC accies		Attendance: 2,195; Referee: Greg Aitken

6 December 2014 15	Aberdeen	3–0	Hamilton Academical	Pittodrie Stadium, Aberdeen
15:00	Taylor 28'; McGinn 51'; Rooney 55' (pen.)	BBC accies	Routledge (red card) 82'	Attendance: 10,330; Referee: Brian Colvin

13 December 2014 16	Hamilton Academical	2–1	Dundee	New Douglas Park, Hamilton
15:00	Andreu 3'; Antoine-Curier 14'	BBC accies	Stewart 61'; Harkins (yellow card) 39' (yellow-red card) 95'	Attendance: 2,636; Referee: Alan Muir

20 December 2014 17	Ross County	0–1	Hamilton Academical	Global Energy Stadium, Dingwall
15:00		BBC accies	Canning 6'	Attendance: 2,966; Referee: John Beaton

27 December 2014 18	Kilmarnock	1–0	Hamilton Academical	Rugby Park, Kilmarnock, East Ayrshire
15:00	Eremenko 93'	BBC accies		Attendance: 3,921; Referee: John Beaton

1 January 2015 19	Hamilton Academical	5–0	Motherwell	New Douglas Park, Hamilton
15:00	Imrie 8'; Crawford 29'; Antoine-Curier 64'; Andreu 69'; Redmond 87'	BBC accies		Attendance: 3,926; Referee: Crawford Allan

4 January 2015 20	St Johnstone	0–1	Hamilton Academical	McDiarmid Park, Perth
15:00	McFadden (yellow card) 41' (yellow-red card) 84'	BBC accies	Andreu 34'	Attendance: 3,202; Referee: Andrew Dallas

12 January 2015 21	Hamilton Academical	2–3	Dundee United	New Douglas Park, Hamilton
19:45	Tena 57'; Crawford 70'	BBC accies	Armstrong 38'; Mackay-Steven 46'; Dillon 77'	Attendance: 2,384; Referee: Madden

17 January 2015 22	Hamilton Academical	0–2	Celtic	New Douglas Park, Hamilton
12:45		BBC Sport accies	Matthews 33'; Henderson 50'	Attendance: 6,007; Referee: Steven McLean

21 January 2015 23	Partick Thistle	5–0	Hamilton Academical	Firhill Stadium, Glasgow
19:45	Doolan 29', 44', 60', 62'; Eccleston 89'	BBC accies		Attendance: 2,138; Referee: Craig Thomson

24 January 2015 24	Hamilton Academical	0–2	Inverness CT	New Douglas Park, Hamilton
15:00		BBC accies	Grant Gillespie 53' (o.g.); Nick Ross 76'	Attendance: 5,089; Referee: Brian Colvin

31 January 2015 25	Dundee	1–1	Hamilton Academical	Dens Park, Dundee
15:00	Stewart 88'	BBC accies	Canning 85'; Imrie (red card) 53'	Attendance: 5,618; Referee: Crawford Allan

7 February 2015 26	Hamilton Academical	0–0	Kilmarnock	New Douglas Park, Hamilton
15:00		BBC accies		Attendance: 2,245; Referee: Alan Muir

15 February 2015 27	Hamilton Academical	0–3	Aberdeen	New Douglas Park, Hamilton
15:30	Tena (yellow card) 52' (yellow-red card) 60'	BBC accies	Considine 6'; Jack 8'; McGinn 88'	Attendance: 3,095; Referee: Collum

22 February 2015 28	Celtic	4–0	Hamilton Academical	Celtic Park, Glasgow
13:00	Commons 57', 82'; Johansen 64'; Guidetti 78'	BBC		Attendance: 47,989; Referee: Brian Colvin

28 February 2015 29	St Mirren	1–0	Hamilton Academical	St Mirren Park, Paisley
15:00	Thompson 63'	BBC		Attendance: 3,503; Referee: Crawford Allan

14 March 2015 30	Hamilton Academical	2–2	Ross County	New Douglas Park, Hamilton
15:00	Scotland 2'; Imrie 18'	BBC	Curran 28'; Gardyne 72'	Attendance: 1,544; Referee: Craig Thomson

20 March 2015 31	Motherwell	4–0	Hamilton Academical	Fir Park, Motherwell
19:45	Ainsworth 49', 50'; Sutton 80', 83' (pen.)	BBC	Lyon (red card) 65'	Attendance: 4,250; Referee: Calum Murray

4 April 2015 32	Hamilton Academical	1–1	St Johnstone	New Douglas Park, Hamilton
15:00	Crawford 7'; Canning (red card) 58'	BBC	Graham 72'	Attendance: 2,032; Referee: Greg Aitken

11 April 2015 33	Dundee United	1–0	Hamilton Academical	Tannadice Park, Dundee
15:00	Erskine 70'	BBC		Attendance: 5,243; Referee: Andrew Dallas

24 April 2015 34	Hamilton Academical	2–0	Motherwell	New Douglas Park, Hamilton
19:45	Scotland 21'; Crawford 52'	BBC		Attendance: 3,301; Referee: John Beaton

2 May 2015 35	Kilmarnock	2–3	Hamilton Academical	Rugby Park, Kilmarnock, East Ayrshire
15:00	Ashcroft 8'; Kiltie 78'	BBC	Scotland 21'; MacKinnon 65'; Hasselbaink 70'	Attendance: 3,450; Referee: Steven McLean

9 May 2015 36	Hamilton Academical	1–1	Partick Thistle	New Douglas Park, Hamilton
15:00	Docherty 85'	BBC	O'Donnell 72'	Attendance: 2,342; Referee: Stephen Finnie

16 May 2015 37	Ross County	2–1	Hamilton Academical	Global Energy Stadium, Dingwall
15:00	Gardyne 58'; Kiss (red card) 82'; Boyce 85'	BBC	Lucas 27'	Attendance: 3,381; Referee: Bobby Madden

23 May 2015 38	Hamilton Academical	1–0	St Mirren	New Douglas Park, Hamilton
15:00	Crawford 83'	BBC		Attendance: 2,425; Referee: Craig Thomson

=== Scottish League Cup ===
2 August 2014 First round	Hamilton Academical	2–1	Arbroath	New Douglas Park, Hamilton
19:45 BST UTC+1	Imrie 3'; Longridge 69'	BBC accies	Kevin Buchan 90'	Attendance: 730; Referee: Craig Thomson

26 August 2014 Second round	Hamilton Academical	4–1	Alloa Athletic	New Douglas Park, Hamilton
19:45 BST UTC+1	Andreu 17'; Canning 66'; Longridge 81'; Brophy 87'	BBC accies	Spence 40'	Attendance: 694; Referee: John McKendrick

24 September 2014 Third round	Hamilton Academical	0–0 (6–5 p)	Motherwell	New Douglas Park, Hamilton
19:45 BST UTC+1	Hendrie (yellow card) 45' (yellow-red card) 65'	BBC accies	O'Brien (yellow card) 46' (yellow-red card) 101'	Attendance: 3,631; Referee: Craig Charleston
	Penalties
	Gillespie (penalty scored); Crawford (penalty scored); Devlin (penalty scored); Longridge (penalty scored); Imrie (penalty scored); Watson (penalty scored)		(penalty scored) Sutton; (penalty scored) McManus; (penalty scored) Ojamaa; (penalty scored) Leitch; (penalty scored) Law; (penalty missed) Ramsden

29 October 2014 Quarter-finals	Aberdeen	1–0	Hamilton Academical	Pittodrie Stadium
19:45 BST UTC+1	Rooney 24'	BBC		Attendance: 9,311; Referee: Madden

=== Scottish Cup ===
29 November 2014 Fourth round	Partick Thistle	2–0	Hamilton Academical	Firhill Stadium, Glasgow
15.00	Stevenson 19', 54'	BBC accies	Imrie (red card) 89'	Attendance: 2,467; Referee: Calum Murray

== Squad statistics ==
During the 2014–15 season, Hamilton Academical have used twenty six different players in competitive games. The table below shows the number of appearances and goals scored by each player.

=== Appearances ===
Includes all competitive matches.

As of match played 23 May 2015

No.	Pos	Nat	Player	Total		Premiership		League Cup		Scottish Cup	
No.	Pos	Nat	Player	Apps	Goals	Apps	Goals	Apps	Goals	Apps	Goals
1	GK	(Northern Ireland) NIR	Michael McGovern	42	0	37	0	4	0	1	0
2	DF	(Scotland) SCO	Ziggy Gordon	29	0	24	0	4	0	1	0
3	DF	(Scotland) SCO	Stephen Hendrie	33	0	26+4	0	2	0	1	0
4	DF	(Scotland) SCO	Michael Devlin	30	0	23+3	0	4	0	0	0
5	DF	(Scotland) SCO	Martin Canning	28	4	23+1	3	3	1	1	0
6	MF	(Scotland) SCO	Grant Gillespie	41	0	36	0	4	0	1	0
7	MF	(Scotland) SCO	Dougie Imrie	38	3	33+1	2	2+1	1	1	0
8	MF	(England) ENG	Jon Routledge	17	0	12+3	0	0+1	0	0+1	0
9	FW	(Trinidad and Tobago) TRI	Jason Scotland	27	5	12+12	5	2	0	1	0
11	MF	(Scotland) SCO	Ali Crawford	43	11	37+1	11	3+1	0	1	0
12	MF	(Scotland) SCO	Darren Lyon	15	0	8+5	0	0+2	0	0	0
14	FW	(Netherlands) NED	Nigel Hasselbaink	10	1	4+6	1	0	0	0	0
15	DF	(Scotland) SCO	Kieran MacDonald	8	0	7+1	0	0	0	0	0
16	MF	(Scotland) SCO	Craig Watson	3	0	0+2	0	0+1	0	0	0
17	MF	(Scotland) SCO	Louis Longridge	36	2	9+22	0	4	2	0+1	0
18	FW	(Scotland) SCO	Darian MacKinnon	34	3	27+3	3	2+1	0	1	0
20	FW	(Scotland) SCO	Eamonn Brophy	19	1	2+14	0	1+2	1	0	0
21	MF	(Scotland) SCO	Greg Docherty	6	1	1+5	1	0	0	0	0
23	DF	(Scotland) SCO	Scott McMann	1	0	0+1	0	0	0	0	0
24	DF	(Spain) ESP	Jesús García Tena	27	1	25+1	1	0	0	1	0
28	MF	(England) ENG	Daniel Redmond	27	2	20+3	2	3	0	1	0
32	FW	(Scotland) SCO	Andy Ryan	9	0	0+7	0	1+1	0	0	0
42	MF	(Scotland) SCO	Steven Boyd	1	0	0+1	0	0	0	0	0
44	DF	(Brazil) BRA	Lucas	6	1	2+4	1	0	0	0	0
45	MF	(Czech Republic) CZE	Nicolas Šumský	1	0	0+1	0	0	0	0	0
Players who left the club during the 2014–15 season
10	MF	(Scotland) SCO	Alex Neil	8	0	7+0	0	1+0	0	0+0	0
22	MF	(France) FRA	Tony Andreu	26	13	21+2	12	3+0	1	0+0	0
99	FW	(France) FRA	Mickaël Antoine-Curier	25	8	20+2	8	1+1	0	0+1	0

=== Goal scorers ===
As of 23 May 2015

Ranking	Nation	Number	Name	Scottish Premiership	Scottish Cup	League Cup	Total
1	(France)	22	Tony Andreu	12	0	1	13
2	(Scotland)	11	Ali Crawford	11	0	0	11
3	(Guadeloupe)	99	Mickaël Antoine-Curier	8	0	0	8
4	(Trinidad and Tobago)	9	Jason Scotland	5	0	0	5
5	(Scotland)	6	Martin Canning	3	0	1	4
6	(Scotland)	7	Dougie Imrie	2	0	1	3
6	(Scotland)	18	Darian MacKinnon	3	0	0	3
8	(Scotland)	17	Louis Longridge	0	0	2	2
8	(England)	28	Daniel Redmond	2	0	0	2
10	(Netherlands)	14	Nigel Hasselbaink	1	0	0	1
10	(Scotland)	20	Eamonn Brophy	0	0	1	1
10	(Scotland)	21	Greg Docherty	1	0	0	1
10	(Spain)	24	Jesús García Tena	1	0	0	1
10	(Brazil)	44	Lucas	1	0	0	1
			TOTALS	50	0	6	56

=== Disciplinary record ===
Includes all competitive matches.
As of matches played 23 May 2015

Number	Nation	Position	Name	Total		Premiership		League Cup		Scottish Cup	
Number	Nation	Position	Name	Booked	Sent off (straight red)	Booked	Sent off (straight red)	Booked	Sent off (straight red)	Booked	Sent off (straight red)
2	(Scotland)	DF	Ziggy Gordon	5	0	5	0	0	0	0	0
3	(Scotland)	DF	Stephen Hendrie	3	1	3	0	0	1	0	0
4	(Scotland)	DF	Michael Devlin	4	1	4	1	0	0	0	0
5	(Scotland)	DF	Martin Canning	8	0	8	0	0	0	0	0
6	(Scotland)	MF	Grant Gillespie	12	0	11	0	1	0	0	0
7	(Scotland)	MF	Dougie Imrie	6	2	6	1	0	0	0	1
8	(England)	MF	Jon Routledge	3	1	2	1	1	0	0	0
9	(Trinidad and Tobago)	FW	Jason Scotland	2	0	1	0	0	0	1	0
10	(Scotland)	MF	Alex Neil	1	0	1	0	0	0	0	0
11	(Scotland)	MF	Ali Crawford	5	0	5	0	0	0	0	0
12	(Scotland)	MF	Darren Lyon	2	1	2	1	0	0	0	0
14	(Netherlands)	FW	Nigel Hasselbaink	2	0	2	0	0	0	0	0
17	(Scotland)	MF	Louis Longridge	5	0	5	0	0	0	0	0
18	(Scotland)	FW	Darian MacKinnon	13	1	12	1	1	0	0	0
22	(France)	FW	Tony Andreu	1	0	1	0	0	0	0	0
24	(Spain)	DF	Jesús García Tena	7	1	7	1	0	0	0	0
28	(Scotland)	MF	Daniel Redmond	2	0	1	0	1	0	0	0
44	(Brazil)	DF	Lucas	1	0	1	0	0	0	0	0
99	(Guadeloupe)	FW	Mickaël Antoine-Curier	1	0	1	0	0	0	0	0
			TOTALS	82	8	77	6	4	1	1	1

== Team statistics ==
=== League table ===
Pos	Team	Pld	W	D	L	GF	GA	GD	Pts
5	Dundee United	38	17	5	16	58	56	+2	56
6	Dundee (Note: Teams in the bottom six at the time of the split (33 games) cannot pass teams in the top six)	38	11	12	15	46	57	−11	45
7	Hamilton Academical	38	15	8	15	50	53	−3	53
8	Partick Thistle	38	12	10	16	48	44	+4	46
9	Ross County	38	12	8	18	46	63	−17	44

Source: SPFL
Rules for classification: 1) points; 2) goal difference; 3) number of goals scored

=== Results by round ===
Round	1	2	3	4	5	6	7	8	9	10	11	12	13	14	15	16	17	18	19	20	21	22	23	24	25	26	27	28	29	30	31	32	33	34	35	36	37	38
Ground	H	A	H	A	H	A	H	A	A	H	A	H	A	H	A	H	A	A	H	A	H	H	A	H	A	H	H	A	A	H	A	H	A	H	A	H	A	H
Result	L	W	W	W	W	D	D	W	W	W	L	D	L	W	L	W	W	L	W	W	L	L	L	L	D	D	L	L	L	D	L	D	L	W	W	D	L	W
Position	11	5	3	2	2	1	3	2	1	1	1	2	3	4	5	5	4	4	4	3	5	5	5	5	5	5	5	5	5	5	6	7	7	7	7	7	7	7

Updated to match(es) played on 23 May 2015. Source: BBC Sport
A = Away; H = Home; W = Win; D = Draw; L = Loss

=== Results by opponent ===
Hamilton score first

Team	Results				Points
Team	1	2	3	4	Points
Aberdeen	3–0	0–3	0–3	X	3
Celtic	1–0	0–2	0–4	X	3
Dundee	0–2	2–1	1–1	X	4
Dundee United	2–2	2–3	0–1	X	1
Inverness CT	0–2	2–4	0–2	X	0
Kilmarnock	0–0	0–1	0–0	3–2	5
Motherwell	4–0	5–0	0–4	2–0	9
Partick Thistle	2–1	3–3	0–5	1–1	5
Ross County	4–0	1–0	2–2	1–2	7
St Johnstone	1–0	1–0	1–1	X	7
St Mirren	2–0	3–0	0–1	1–0	9

Source: 2014–15 Scottish Premier League Results Table

== Transfers ==
=== Players in ===
Player	From	Fee
(Scotland) Dougie Imrie	(Scotland) Greenock Morton	Free
(Scotland) Kieran MacDonald	(Scotland) Clyde	Free
(Northern Ireland) Michael McGovern	(Scotland) Falkirk	Free
(England) Daniel Redmond	(England) Wigan Athletic	Free
(Scotland) Darren Hill	(Scotland) Forfar Athletic	Undisclosed
(Republic of Ireland) Lee Lynch	(Republic of Ireland) Limerick	Free
(Trinidad and Tobago) Jason Scotland	Re-signed	Free
(Brazil) Lucas	(Moldova) Milsami Orhei	Free
(Czech Republic) Nico Šumský	(Slovakia) Dukla Banská Bystrica	Free
(Netherlands) Nigel Hasselbaink	(Greece) Veria	Free

=== Players out ===
Player	To	Fee
(Scotland) Kevin Cuthbert	(Scotland) Raith Rovers	Free
(Scotland) James Keatings	(Scotland) Heart of Midlothian	Free
(Scotland) Lee Kilday	(Scotland) Greenock Morton	Free
(Scotland) Kieran MacDonald	(Scotland) Dumbarton	Loan
(Trinidad and Tobago) Jason Scotland	Released	Released
(Guadeloupe) Mickaël Antoine-Curier	(England) Burton Albion	Free
(France) Tony Andreu	(England) Norwich City	£1,000,000
(Scotland) Jaison McGrath	(Scotland) Celtic B	Free
