= List of Scottish football transfers winter 2012–13 =

This is a list of Scottish football transfers featuring at least one 2012–13 Scottish Premier League club or one 2012–13 Scottish First Division club which were completed after the end of the summer 2012 transfer window and before the end of the 2012–13 season.

== September 2012 – May 2013 ==
Date	Name	Moving from	Moving to	Fee
1 September 2012	Steve MacLean	Yeovil Town	St Johnstone	Free
2 September 2012	Lassad Nouioui	Deportivo de La Coruña	Celtic	Free
3 September 2012	Alan Combe	Greenock Morton	Heart of Midlothian (coach)	Free
5 September 2012	Ross Forbes	Motherwell	Partick Thistle	Free
5 September 2012	Darian MacKinnon	Hamilton Academical	Ayr United	Loan
6 September 2012	Cillian Sheridan	CSKA Sofia	Kilmarnock	Free
6 September 2012	Brian Easton	Burnley	Dundee	Free
10 September 2012	Graeme MacGregor	Bolton Wanderers	St Mirren	Free
11 September 2012	David Hutton	Hamilton Academical	Greenock Morton	Free
12 September 2012	Grégory Vignal	Unattached	Dundee United	Free
12 September 2012	Andy Rankin	Kilmarnock	Newmains United Community	Free
13 September 2012	Tom Taiwo	Carlisle United	Hibernian	Free
13 September 2012	Mark Fotheringham	Dundee	Ross County	Free
13 September 2012	Mark Kerr	Dunfermline Athletic	Dundee	Free
14 September 2012	Mark McGuigan	Partick Thistle	Albion Rovers	Loan
14 September 2012	Simon Mensing	Hamilton Academical	Raith Rovers	Free
14 September 2012	Jamie Pollock	Motherwell	East Fife	Free
18 September 2012	Paul McGinn	Queen's Park	St Mirren	Free
21 September 2012	Jordan White	Falkirk	Stirling Albion	Loan
21 September 2012	Bobby Barr	Livingston	East Fife	Loan
25 September 2012	Robbie Thomson	Celtic	Stenhousemuir	Loan
26 September 2012	Allan Smith	Dunfermline Athletic	Brechin City	Loan
27 September 2012	Jonathan Page	Motherwell	Hamilton Academical	Loan
27 September 2012	Derek Riordan	St Johnstone	Bristol Rovers	Free
28 September 2012	Kurtis Byrne	Ross County	Brechin City	Loan
28 September 2012	Ross Fisher	Kilmarnock	Brechin City	Loan
28 September 2012	Darren Mackie	Aberdeen	Phoenix	Free
2 October 2012	Paul Slane	Celtic	Partick Thistle	Loan
2 October 2012	Fraser Keast	Airdrie United	Broxburn Athletic	Loan
3 October 2012	Mitchel Megginson	Aberdeen	Alloa Athletic	Loan
5 October 2012	Calum Antell	Hibernian	East Fife	Loan
5 October 2012	Andrew Russell	Livingston	Bathgate Thistle	Loan
5 October 2012	Lee Kilday	Hamilton Academical	Stenhousemuir	Loan
5 October 2012	Jonathan Stynes	Kilmarnock	Cambridge City	Free
6 October 2012	Sean Murdoch	Unattached	Hibernian	Free
12 October 2012	Scott Morton	Airdrie United	Montrose	Free
12 October 2012	Ross Brady	Livingston	Berwick Rangers	Free
12 October 2012	Dean Carse	Aberdeen	Berwick Rangers	Free
15 October 2012	Jamie McKernon	St Mirren	East Stirlingshire	Loan
16 October 2012	James Craigen	Partick Thistle	Forfar Athletic	Loan
17 October 2012	Josh Watt	Motherwell	Airdrie United	Loan
18 October 2012	Nicky Low	Aberdeen	Alloa Athletic	Loan
22 October 2012	Kieran MacDonald	Motherwell	Clyde	Free
26 October 2012	Rudolf Skácel	Heart of Midlothian	Dundee United	Free
26 October 2012	Albert Puigdollers	CE Sabadell	Cowdenbeath	Free
27 October 2012	Mohamadou Sissoko	Udinese	Kilmarnock	Free
27 October 2012	Ross Gray	Livingston	Berwick Rangers	Loan
6 November 2012	Willie Muir	Motherwell	Ayr United	Free
7 November 2012	Jordan Allan	Hamilton Academical	Bo'ness United	Loan
8 November 2012	Brad McKay	Heart of Midlothian	Stenhousemuir	Loan
10 November 2012	Ross Lindsay	Kilmarnock	Clyde	Free
13 November 2012	Graeme Smith	Gabala	Partick Thistle	Free
16 November 2012	Callum Tapping	Heart of Midlothian	Alloa Athletic	Loan
16 November 2012	Burton O'Brien	Unattached	Livingston	Free
16 November 2012	Grant Adam	St Mirren	Airdrie United	Loan
20 November 2012	Graeme Smith	St Mirren	Peterhead	Free
22 November 2012	Christie Elliot	Partick Thistle	Albion Rovers	Loan
22 November 2012	Bradley Halsman	Partick Thistle	Albion Rovers	Loan
22 November 2012	Ian Murray	Hibernian	Dumbarton	Free
23 November 2012	Jordan Holt	St Mirren	East Stirlingshire	Loan
23 November 2012	Paul McGinn	St Mirren	Queen's Park	Loan
23 November 2012	Ricki Lamie	Airdrie United	Clyde	Loan
23 November 2012	Nick Phinn	Dunfermline Athletic	Stranraer	Free
26 November 2012	Danny Uchechi	Aberdeen	Väsby United	Free
30 November 2012	Jack Hamilton	Heart of Midlothian	Forfar Athletic	Loan
30 November 2012	Willie Robertson	Dundee United	Forfar Athletic	Loan
6 December 2012	Dale Hilson	Dundee United	Forfar Athletic	Loan
7 December 2012	Liam Buchanan	Sligo Rovers	Airdrie United	Free
7 December 2012	Euan Blair	Greenock Morton	Hurlford United	Loan
18 December 2012	Harry Monaghan	Hibernian	Annan Athletic	Loan
22 December 2012	Marc McCusker	Queen of the South	Dumbarton	Free
28 December 2012	Iain Beattie	Greenock Morton	Neilston Juniors	Loan
28 December 2012	Martin Maguire	Greenock Morton	Port Glasgow	Loan
1 January 2013	Ross Davidson	Kilmarnock	Airdrie United	Loan
1 January 2013	Conor Newton	Newcastle United	St Mirren	Loan
1 January 2013	Phil Johnston	Dumbarton	Stirling Albion	Loan
1 January 2013	Jordan White	Falkirk	Stirling Albion	Free
1 January 2013	Steven Craig	Ross County	Partick Thistle	Free
2 January 2013	Jonathan Page	Motherwell	Hamilton Academical	Free
2 January 2013	Rabiu Ibrahim	Celtic	Kilmarnock	Free
2 January 2013	Scott Smith	Hibernian	Dumbarton	Loan
2 January 2013	David Rowson	Partick Thistle	Stenhousemuir	Loan
2 January 2013	Bobby Barr	Livingston	East Fife	Free
3 January 2013	Jamie Murphy	Motherwell	Sheffield United	Undisclosed
3 January 2013	Liam Caddis	St Johnstone	Cowdenbeath	Loan
3 January 2013	Albert Puigdollers	Cowdenbeath	Recreativo de Huelva	Free
3 January 2013	Bernardo Domínguez (Note: Domínguez left Dunfermline Athletic in the summer of 2012.)	Dunfermline Athletic	Mirandés	Free
4 January 2013	Sam Stanton	Hibernian	Cowdenbeath	Loan
4 January 2013	Kane Hemmings	Rangers	Cowdenbeath	Loan
4 January 2013	Kurtis Byrne	Ross County	Dundalk	Free
5 January 2013	Dylan Easton	Livingston	Berwick Rangers	Free
7 January 2013	Ryan McGowan	Heart of Midlothian	Shandong Luneng Taishan	£400,000
9 January 2013	Rami Gershon	Standard Liège	Celtic	Loan
9 January 2013	Kallum Higginbotham	Huddersfield Town	Motherwell	Loan
9 January 2013	Danny Devine	Fleetwood Town	Inverness Caledonian Thistle	Free
10 January 2013	Ivan Sproule	Hibernian	Ross County	Free
10 January 2013	André Hainault	Houston Dynamo	Ross County	Free
10 January 2013	Liam Kelly	Kilmarnock	Bristol City	Undisclosed
11 January 2013	Glenn Daniels	Celtic	Partick Thistle	Loan
11 January 2013	Ryan Scully	Partick Thistle	Albion Rovers	Loan
11 January 2013	Jamie Campbell	Partick Thistle	Stranraer	Loan
11 January 2013	Sean O'Hanlon (Note: O'Hanlon left Hibernian in the summer of 2012.)	Hibernian	Carlisle United	Free
12 January 2013	Jamie Reid	Dundee	Stenhousemuir	Loan
12 January 2013	Jamie Lyden	Dumbarton	Clyde	Loan
12 January 2013	Kevin Nicoll	Dumbarton	Clyde	Loan
15 January 2013	Evangelos Ikonomou	Atromitos	Ross County	Free
16 January 2013	Michael Nelson	Kilmarnock	Bradford City	£30,000
17 January 2013	Tom Rogić	Central Coast Mariners	Celtic	£400,000
17 January 2013	Mitchel Megginson	Aberdeen	Alloa Athletic	Loan
18 January 2013	Danny Wilson	Liverpool	Heart of Midlothian	Loan
21 January 2013	Steffen Wohlfarth	SV Wehen Wiesbaden	Ross County	Free
22 January 2013	Mark Lamont	St Mirren	Dumbarton	Free
23 January 2013	Jordon Brown	Aberdeen	Forfar Athletic	Loan
23 January 2013	Liam Buchanan	Airdrie United	Ayr United	Free
23 January 2013	Mark Corcoran	Ross County	Stenhousemuir	Free
24 January 2013	Colin McMenamin	Ross County	Greenock Morton	Free
24 January 2013	Martin Boyle	Dundee	Montrose	Loan
24 January 2013	Andy Haworth (Note: Haworth left Falkirk in November 2012.)	Falkirk	Rochdale	Free
24 January 2013	Mohamed Bangura	Celtic	Elfsborg	Loan
25 January 2013	Michael Ngoo	Liverpool	Heart of Midlothian	Loan
25 January 2013	Charlie Taylor	Leeds United	Inverness Caledonian Thistle	Loan
25 January 2013	Gary Harkins	Kilmarnock	Dundee	Undisclosed
25 January 2013	Martin McNiff	Dumbarton	Annan Athletic	Loan
26 January 2013	John Gibson	Dundee	Montrose	Loan
28 January 2013	Scott Robertson	Blackpool	Hibernian	Free
29 January 2013	Jordan Gibbons	Queens Park Rangers	Inverness Caledonian Thistle	Loan
29 January 2013	Sammy Clingan	Doncaster Rovers	Kilmarnock	Free
29 January 2013	Michael Doughty	Queens Park Rangers	St Johnstone	Loan
29 January 2013	Dale Keenan	Partick Thistle	East Fife	Loan
29 January 2013	Ross Forsyth	Dumbarton	Stirling Albion	Loan
29 January 2013	Gavin Morrison	Inverness Caledonian Thistle	Elgin City	Loan
30 January 2013	Craig Moore	Motherwell	Cowdenbeath	Loan
31 January 2013	David Morgan	Nottingham Forest	Dundee	Loan
31 January 2013	Branislav Mićić	Sion	Ross County	Free
31 January 2013	Paul Dummett	Newcastle United	St Mirren	Loan
31 January 2013	Jon Robertson	St Mirren	Cowdenbeath	Loan
31 January 2013	Paul McGinn	St Mirren	Dumbarton	Loan
31 January 2013	Mehdi Abeid	Newcastle United	St Johnstone	Loan
31 January 2013	Gwion Edwards	Swansea City	St Johnstone	Loan
31 January 2013	Mark Reynolds	Sheffield Wednesday	Aberdeen	Free
31 January 2013	Dan Twardzik	Como	Aberdeen	Free
31 January 2013	Matt Done	Barnsley	Hibernian	Loan
31 January 2013	Neil McGregor	Dundee	Ayr United	Loan
31 January 2013	Patrick Walker	Dumbarton	Albion Rovers	Free
31 January 2013	Colin McCabe	Cavan Shamrocks	Celtic	Free
31 January 2013	Euan Smith	Hibernian	Arbroath	Loan
7 February 2013	Steven Hetherington	Motherwell	Airdrie United	Loan
11 February 2013	Will Vaulks	Workington	Falkirk	Free
18 February 2013	James McFadden	Sunderland	Motherwell	Free
19 February 2013	Andrew Driver	Heart of Midlothian	Houston Dynamo	Loan
22 February 2013	Iain Flannigan	Unattached	Falkirk	Free
23 February 2013	Kris Boyd	Unattached	Kilmarnock	Free
27 February 2013	Marcus Törnstrand	Unattached	Dundee United	Free
5 March 2013	Josh Watt	Motherwell	Raith Rovers	Loan
7 March 2013	Rory Boulding	Unattached	Dundee United	Free
9 March 2013	Kevin Thomson	Middlesbrough	Hibernian	Free
14 March 2013	Steve Simonsen	Unattached	Dundee	Free
15 March 2013	Nicky Devlin	Motherwell	Stenhousemuir	Loan
29 March 2013	Adam Asghar	Motherwell	Dumbarton	Loan
31 March 2013	Andrew Barrowman	Dunfermline Athletic F.C.	Dundee	Made Redundant

== See also ==
- List of Scottish football transfers summer 2012
- List of Scottish football transfers summer 2013
