= List of Scottish football transfers summer 2013 =

This is a list of Scottish football transfers featuring at least one 2013–14 Scottish Premiership club or one 2013–14 Scottish Championship club which were completed after the end of the 2012–13 season and before the end of the 2013 summer transfer window.

== May 2013 – August 2013 ==
Date	Name	Moving from	Moving to	Fee
1 June 2013	Owain Tudur Jones	Inverness Caledonian Thistle	Hibernian	Free
3 June 2013	Gary Harkins	Dundee	St Mirren	Free
4 June 2013	Chris Humphrey	Motherwell	Preston North End	Free
5 June 2013	Peter MacDonald	Morton	Dundee	Undisclosed
5 June 2013	Willie Dyer	Greenock Morton	Dundee	Undisclosed
6 June 2013	Gavin Rae	Aberdeen	Dundee	Free
7 June 2013	Daryl Murphy	Celtic	Ipswich Town	Free
10 June 2013	Johnny Russell	Dundee United	Derby County	£750,000
12 June 2013	Iain Vigurs	Ross County	Motherwell	Free
13 June 2013	Amido Baldé	Vitória S.C.	Celtic	£1.8 million
14 June 2013	Stewart Murdoch	Falkirk	Fleetwood Town	Free
18 June 2013	Calvin Zola	Burton Albion	Aberdeen	Free
20 June 2013	Virgil van Dijk	Groningen	Celtic	£2.6 million
21 June 2013	Darren Maatsen	Excelsior	Ross County	Free
24 June 2013	Gregg Wylde	Bolton Wanderers	Aberdeen	Free
28 June 2013	John Sutton	Heart of Midlothian	Motherwell	Free
30 June 2013	Danny Wilson	Liverpool	Heart of Midlothian	Free
30 June 2013	Fraser Mullen	Heart of Midlothian	Hibernian	Free
1 July 2013	Jon Daly	Dundee United	Rangers	Free
1 July 2013	Willo Flood	Dundee United	Aberdeen	Free
1 July 2013	Barry Douglas	Dundee United	Lech Poznań	Free
1 July 2013	Paul Paton	Partick Thistle	Dundee United	Free
1 July 2013	Chris Erskine	Partick Thistle	Dundee United	Free
1 July 2013	Brian Graham	Raith Rovers	Dundee United	Free
1 July 2013	Andrew Robertson	Queen's Park	Dundee United	Undisclosed
1 July 2013	Aidan Connolly	Queen's Park	Dundee United	Undisclosed
1 July 2013	Thomas Rogne	Celtic	Wigan Athletic	Free
1 July 2013	Gwion Edwards	Swansea City	St Johnstone	Loan
2 July 2013	David Wotherspoon	Hibernian	St Johnstone	Free
2 July 2013	Dean Brill	Luton Town	Inverness Caledonian Thistle	Loan
2 July 2013	David Goodwillie	Blackburn Rovers	Dundee United	Loan
3 July 2013	Marcus Törnstrand	Dundee United	Östersund	Free
3 July 2013	Barry Robson	Sheffield United	Aberdeen	Free
3 July 2013	Gunnar Nielsen	Unnatached	Motherwell	Free
3 July 2013	Michael Tidser	Greenock Morton	Rotherham United	£50,000
4 July 2013	Calum Butcher	Hayes & Yeading United	Dundee United	Free
4 July 2013	Kudus Oyenuga	Hayes & Yeading United	Dundee United	Free
8 July 2013	Steven Saunders	Motherwell	Ross County	Free
8 July 2013	Brian Easton	Dundee	St Johnstone	Free
8 July 2013	Steve Banks	Dundee United	St Johnstone	Free
10 July 2013	Sam Parkin	St Mirren	Exeter City	Free
11 July 2013	Gary Fraser	Hamilton	Bolton Wanderers	Free
11 July 2013	Victor Wanyama	Celtic	Southampton	£12.5 million
12 July 2013	Rory Fallon	Aberdeen	St Johnstone	Free
13 July 2013	Gary McDonald	Morecambe	St Johnstone	Free
13 July 2013	Rowan Vine	St Johnstone	Hibernian	Free
15 July 2013	Scott Brown	Bradford City	St Johnstone	Free
15 July 2013	Stephen McManus	Middlesbrough	Motherwell	Free
15 July 2013	Nicky Weaver	Sheffield Wednesday	Aberdeen	Free
16 July 2013	Steven Mouyokolo	Unattached	Celtic	Free
17 July 2013	Mark Kerr	Dundee	Partick Thistle	Free
17 July 2013	Lyle Taylor	Falkirk	Sheffield United	Undisclosed
17 July 2013	Darren Barr	Heart of Midlothian	Kilmarnock	Free
18 July 2013	Carl Tremarco	Macclesfield Town	Inverness Caledonian Thistle	Free
19 July 2013	Sean McAllister	Cowdenbeath	Scunthorpe United	Free
19 July 2013	Henoc Mukendi	Liverpool	Partick Thistle	Loan
22 July 2013	Gary Fraser	Bolton Wanderers	Partick Thistle	Loan
22 July 2013	Steven Craig	Partick Thistle	Wycombe Wanderers	Free
24 July 2013	Mark Fotheringham	Ross County	Notts County	Free
25 July 2013	Lewis Guy	St Mirren	Carlisle United	Free
25 July 2013	Nadir Çiftçi	NAC Breda	Dundee United	Free
25 July 2013	Gary Deegan	Hibernian	Northampton Town	Free
25 July 2013	Ryan Ferguson	Dundee United	Dunfermline Athletic	Loan
26 July 2013	Robbie Thomson	Celtic	Rochdale	Free
26 July 2013	Gary Hooper	Celtic	Norwich City	£5.5 million
26 July 2013	Michael Hector	Reading	Aberdeen	Loan
27 July 2013	Torbjørn Agdestein	Brighton & Hove Albion	Inverness Caledonian Thistle	Free
29 July 2013	James Collins	Swindon Town	Hibernian	£200,000
29 July 2013	Henri Anier	Viking FK	Motherwell	Loan
30 July 2013	Brian McLean	Dundee United	Ross County	Free
30 July 2013	Luke Johnston	Dundee United	Dunfermline Athletic	Loan
30 July 2013	Jordan Moore	Dundee United	Dunfermline Athletic	Loan
30 July 2013	Graham Carey	St Mirren	Ross County	Free
30 July 2013	Derk Boerrigter	Ajax	Celtic	£3 million
31 July 2013	Isaac Osbourne	Aberdeen	Partick Thistle	Free
31 July 2013	Simón Colina	Barcelona	Partick Thistle	Free
1 August 2013	Michael Nelson	Bradford City	Hibernian	Free
3 August 2013	Kyle Jacobs	Livingston	Kilmarnock	Free
5 August 2013	Don Cowan	Dundee	Southend United	Free
7 August 2013	Callum McGregor	Celtic	Notts County	Loan
7 August 2013	Richie Ryan	Dundee United	Shamrock Rovers	Free
8 August 2013	Kallum Higginbotham	Huddersfield Town	Partick Thistle	Free
9 August 2013	Kelvin Wilson	Celtic	Nottingham Forest	£2.5 million
20 August 2013	Mark Wilson	Bristol City	Dundee United	Free
27 August 2013	Dale Hilson	Dundee United	Forfar Athletic	Loan
29 August 2013	Lionel Ainsworth	Rotherham United	Motherwell	Loan
30 August 2013	Nir Biton	Ashdod	Celtic	£700,000
30 August 2013	Michael Gardyne	Dundee United	Kilmarnock	Loan
31 August 2013	Paul Di Giacomo	Unattached	Hamilton	Free

== See also ==
- List of Scottish football transfers winter 2012–13
- List of Scottish football transfers winter 2013–14
