= List of Scottish football transfers summer 2015 =

This is a list of Scottish football transfers featuring at least one 2015–16 Scottish Premiership club or one 2015–16 Scottish Championship club which were completed during the summer 2015 transfer window. The window closed at midnight on 1 September 2015.

== List ==
Date	Name	Moving from	Moving to	Fee
14 May 2015	Jamie Masson	Aberdeen	Formartine United	Free
15 May 2015	Justin Johnson	F.C. United of Manchester	Dundee United	Free
15 May 2015	Jamie Reid	Dundee	Arbroath	Free
15 May 2015	Declan McManus	Aberdeen	Fleetwood Town	Free
20 May 2015	Joe Shaughnessy	Aberdeen	St Johnstone	Free
20 May 2015	Richard Brittain	Ross County	Brora Rangers	Free
20 May 2015	Terry Dunfield	Ross County	Toronto Atomic	Free
20 May 2015	Ben Frempah	Ross County	Hendon	Free
20 May 2015	Abdoulaye Méïté	Ross County	SJK	Free
21 May 2015	Colin Hamilton	Brechin City	Alloa Athletic	Free
22 May 2015	Ryan Finnie	Partick Thistle	Annan Athletic	Free
24 May 2015	Russell Anderson	Aberdeen	Retired	Free
25 May 2015	Andrew McNeil	Airdrieonians	Alloa Athletic	Free
25 May 2015	Graham Cummins	Exeter City	St Johnstone	Free
25 May 2015	Ian McShane	Queen of the South	Ross County	Undisclosed
26 May 2015	Sammy Clingan	Kilmarnock	Linfield	Free
26 May 2015	Chris Chantler	Kilmarnock	Macclesfield Town	Free
26 May 2015	Nathan Eccleston	Kilmarnock	Békéscsaba 1912 Előre	Free
27 May 2015	Michael Gardyne	Dundee United	Ross County	Free
28 May 2015	Martin Woods	Ross County	Shrewsbury Town	Free
28 May 2015	Ryan Conroy	Raith Rovers	Queen of the South	Free
28 May 2015	Robbie Thomson	Cowdenbeath	Queen of the South	Free
28 May 2015	Kevin Dzierzawski	Queen of the South	Peterhead	Free
28 May 2015	Chris Mitchell	Queen of the South	Clyde	Free
29 May 2015	Scott Fox	Partick Thistle	Ross County	Free
29 May 2015	Gregor Buchanan	Dunfermline Athletic	Dumbarton	Free
29 May 2015	Grant Gallagher	Stranraer	Dumbarton	Free
29 May 2015	Mark Williams	St Mirren	Alloa Athletic	Free
1 June 2015	James Keatings	Heart of Midlothian	Hibernian	Free
1 June 2015	David Mitchell	Stranraer	Dundee	Free
1 June 2015	Gary Teale	St Mirren	Retired	Free
2 June 2015	Tomáš Černý	Hibernian	Partick Thistle	Free
2 June 2015	Dedryck Boyata	Manchester City	Celtic	£1,500,000
2 June 2015	Julen Etxabeguren	East Fife	Dundee	Free
2 June 2015	Dan Carmichael	Queen of the South	Hibernian	Free
2 June 2015	Paul Lawson	Motherwell	Formartine United	Free
2 June 2015	Ross M. Stewart	Motherwell	Albion Rovers	Free
2 June 2015	Nathan Thomas	Motherwell	Mansfield Town	Free
3 June 2015	Scott Robinson	Heart of Midlothian	Kilmarnock	Free
3 June 2015	Joe Chalmers	Celtic	Motherwell	Free
3 June 2015	Darren Petrie	Dundee United	Raith Rovers	Free
3 June 2015	Calum Elliot	Raith Rovers	Retired	Free
3 June 2015	Kevin Moon	Raith Rovers	ECU Joondalup SC	Free
4 June 2015	Ryan McCord	Alloa Athletic	Raith Rovers	Free
4 June 2015	Liam Fox	Raith Rovers	Heart of Midlothian (coach)	Free
4 June 2015	Kevin Cawley	Alloa Athletic	Dumbarton	Free
4 June 2015	Darren Miller	Queen's Park	Dumbarton	Free
5 June 2015	Marley Watkins	Inverness Caledonian Thistle	Barnsley	Free
7 June 2015	Franck Dja Djedje	Hibernian	Al Shahaniya	Free
8 June 2015	Mitch Megginson	Dumbarton	Raith Rovers	Free
8 June 2015	Greig Spence	Alloa Athletic	Cowdenbeath	Free
8 June 2015	Jason Talbot	Livingston	Dunfermline Athletic	Free
8 June 2015	Ian Black	Rangers	Shrewsbury Town	Free
8 June 2015	Sebastian Faure	Rangers	Lyon B	Free
10 June 2015	Mark Docherty	Alloa Athletic	Dumbarton	Free
10 June 2015	Alan Martin	Clyde	Hamilton Academical	Free
10 June 2015	Kyle Benedictus	Dundee	Raith Rovers	Free
10 June 2015	Lee Erwin	Motherwell	Leeds United	Compensation
10 June 2015	Graeme Shinnie	Inverness Caledonian Thistle	Aberdeen	Free
10 June 2015	Brad McKay	Heart of Midlothian	St Johnstone	Free
10 June 2015	Rory Loy	Falkirk	Dundee	Free
10 June 2015	Daryll Meggatt	Alloa Athletic	Dundee	Free
10 June 2015	Nicky Low	Aberdeen	Dundee	Free
10 June 2015	Brian Graham	Dundee United	Ross County	Free
10 June 2015	Callum Booth	Hibernian	Partick Thistle	Free
10 June 2015	Kane Hemmings	Barnsley	Dundee	Free
11 June 2015	Lewis Toshney	Cowdenbeath	Raith Rovers	Free
11 June 2015	Joe Nuttall	Manchester City	Aberdeen	Free
12 June 2015	Paul Quinn	Ross County	Aberdeen	Free
12 June 2015	Kyle Letheren	Dundee	Blackpool	Free
15 June 2015	Calum Butcher	Dundee United	Burton Albion	Free
15 June 2015	David Van Zanten	Dumbarton	Airdrieonians	Free
15 June 2015	Callum Fordyce	Livingston	Dunfermline Athletic	Free
16 June 2015	Clark Robertson	Aberdeen	Blackpool	Free
16 June 2015	Darren Holden	Hartlepool United	Ross County	Free
17 June 2015	Mark Brown	Ross County	Dumbarton	Free
17 June 2015	Willie Gibson	Stranraer	Dumbarton	Free
17 June 2015	John Sutton	Motherwell	St Johnstone	Free
17 June 2015	Darren Brownlie	Cowdenbeath	Queen of the South	Free
17 June 2015	Shaun Rutherford	Livingston	Queen of the South	Free
17 June 2015	Steven Higgins	Motherwell	Queen of the South	Free
18 June 2015	Nat Wedderburn	Cowdenbeath	Inverness Caledonian Thistle	Free
18 June 2015	Jonathan Franks	Hartlepool United	Ross County	Free
18 June 2015	Blazej Augustyn	Gornik Zabrze	Heart of Midlothian	Free
18 June 2015	Ben Richards-Everton	Partick Thistle	Dunfermline Athletic	Free
18 June 2015	Jordyn Sheerin	Musselburgh Athletic	Livingston	Free
19 June 2015	Mark Durnan	Queen of the South	Dundee United	£40,000
19 June 2015	Martin Boyle	Dundee	Hibernian	Free
19 June 2015	Teemu Pukki	Celtic	Brondby	Undisclosed
20 June 2015	Darren Barr	Ross County	Dumbarton	Free
20 June 2015	Gordon Smith	Stirling Albion	Dumbarton	Free
20 June 2015	Frank McKeown	Stranraer	Greenock Morton	Free
22 June 2015	Dougie Hill	Raith Rovers	Alloa Athletic	Free
22 June 2015	Kyle McAusland	Dunfermline Athletic	Alloa Athletic	Free
22 June 2015	Burton O'Brien	Livingston	Alloa Athletic	Free
22 June 2015	Liam Buchanan	Alloa Athletic	Livingston	Free
22 June 2015	Jackson Longridge	Stranraer	Livingston	Free
22 June 2015	Danny Wilson	Heart of Midlothian	Rangers	Free
22 June 2015	Rob Kiernan	Wigan Athletic	Rangers	£200,000
22 June 2015	Stephen O'Donnell	Partick Thistle	Luton Town	Free
22 June 2015	Jamie MacDonald	Falkirk	Kilmarnock	Free
22 June 2015	Jack Beaumont	Livingston	Cowdenbeath	Free
23 June 2015	Marián Kello	St Mirren	Aris Limassol	Free
23 June 2015	Gavin Reilly	Queen of the South	Heart of Midlothian	Compensation
23 June 2015	Jaroslaw Fojut	Dundee United	Pogon Szczecin	Free
23 June 2015	Craig Wighton	Dundee	Raith Rovers	Loan
24 June 2015	Nick Ross	Inverness Caledonian Thistle	Dundee	Free
24 June 2015	John Herron	Celtic	Blackpool	Free
25 June 2015	David Crawford	Arbroath	Alloa Athletic	Free
25 June 2015	Scott Agnew	Dumbarton	St Mirren	Free
25 June 2015	Juan Manuel Delgado Lloria	Kalloni	Heart of Midlothian	Free
25 June 2015	Kallum Higginbotham	Partick Thistle	Kilmarnock	Free
25 June 2015	David Clarkson	Dundee	Motherwell	Free
26 June 2015	James Craigen	Partick Thistle	Raith Rovers	Free
26 June 2015	Danny Ward	Liverpool	Aberdeen	Loan
26 June 2015	Danny Rogers	Aberdeen	Falkirk	Loan
27 June 2015	Dale Hilson	Forfar Athletic	Queen of the South	Free
27 June 2015	Omar Kader	Forfar Athletic	Alloa Athletic	Free
28 June 2015	Chris Turner	Dumbarton	Hamilton Academical	Free
29 June 2015	Kris Boyd	Rangers	Kilmarnock	Free
29 June 2015	Mark Oxley	Hull City	Hibernian	Free
29 June 2015	Stuart Carswell	Motherwell	St Mirren	Free
29 June 2015	Michael Paton	Queen of the South	Dunfermline Athletic	Free
29 June 2015	Jake Jervis	Ross County	Plymouth Argyle	Free
29 June 2015	Kyle Jacobs	Livingston	Queen of the South	Free
29 June 2015	Jordan Marshall	Carlisle United	Queen of the South	Free
30 June 2015	Richard Foster	Rangers	Ross County	Free
30 June 2015	Chris Robertson	Port Vale	Ross County	Free
30 June 2015	Andrew Davies	Bradford City	Ross County	Free
30 June 2015	Louis Laing	Nottingham Forest	Motherwell	Free
30 June 2015	Louis Moult	Wrexham	Motherwell	Undisclosed
30 June 2015	Gregg Wylde	St Mirren	Plymouth Argyle	Free
30 June 2015	Kieran Gibbons	Aberdeen	Livingston	Free
1 July 2015	Manuel Pascali	Kilmarnock	Cittadella	Free
1 July 2015	Lee Croft	St Johnstone	Oldham Athletic	Free
1 July 2015	Stephen Hendrie	Hamilton Academical	West Ham United	Compensation
1 July 2015	Kevin Holt	Queen of the South	Dundee	Compensation
1 July 2015	Stewart Murdoch	Fleetwood Town	Ross County	Free
1 July 2015	Wes Fletcher	York City	Motherwell	Free
1 July 2015	Scott Robertson	Hibernian	Botosani	Free
1 July 2015	David Amoo	Carlisle United	Partick Thistle	Free
1 July 2015	Steve Banks	St Johnstone	Retired	Retired
1 July 2015	Saidy Janko	Manchester United	Celtic	Compensation
2 July 2015	Ben Gordon	Alloa Athletic	Livingston	Free
2 July 2015	Ross Millen	Dunfermline Athletic	Livingston	Free
2 July 2015	Stevie Smith	Rangers	Kilmarnock	Free
2 July 2015	Graham Carey	Ross County	Plymouth Argyle	Free
2 July 2015	Hólmbert Friðjónsson	Celtic	KR	Free
3 July 2015	Wes Foderingham	Swindon Town	Rangers	Free
3 July 2015	Paul McMullan	Celtic	St Mirren	Loan
3 July 2015	Adam Matthews	Celtic	Sunderland	£2,000,000
3 July 2015	Connor McManus	Celtic	Alloa Athletic	Loan
3 July 2015	Michael Duffy	Celtic	Alloa Athletic	Loan
3 July 2015	Jamie Burrows	Rangers	Yeovil Town	Free
3 July 2015	Conor Brennan	Kilmarnock	Stranraer	Loan
4 July 2015	Lee Lynch	Hamilton Academical	Limerick	Free
4 July 2015	Bradley Donaldson	Livingston	Cowdenbeath	Free
4 July 2015	Callum Tapping	Brechin City	Queen of the South	Free
6 July 2015	Antonio Reguero	Ross County	Hibernian	Free
6 July 2015	Darvydas Šernas	Ross County	Zalgiris Vilnius	Free
6 July 2015	Kudus Oyenuga	Dundee United	Hartlepool United	Free
7 July 2015	Radoslaw Cierzniak	Dundee United	Wisła Kraków	Free
7 July 2015	Jon Routledge	Hamilton Academical	Dumbarton	Free
7 July 2015	Calum Waters	Celtic	Dumbarton	Loan
7 July 2015	Jordan Roberts	Aldershot Town	Inverness Caledonian Thistle	Free
8 July 2015	Logan Bailly	OH Leuven	Celtic	Undisclosed
9 July 2015	Nadir Çiftçi	Dundee United	Celtic	£1,500,000
9 July 2015	Stuart Findlay	Celtic	Kilmarnock	Loan
9 July 2015	Dale Carrick	Heart of Midlothian	Kilmarnock	Free
9 July 2015	Tarmo Kink	Inverness Caledonian Thistle	FC Levadia	Free
10 July 2015	Spas Georgiev	Dobrudzha Dobrich	Livingston	Free
10 July 2015	Craig Murray	Aberdeen	East Fife	Free
10 July 2015	Simon Ramsden	Motherwell	Gateshead	Free
11 July 2015	Lee McCulloch	Rangers	Kilmarnock	Free
13 July 2015	Coll Donaldson	Queens Park Rangers	Dundee United	Free
13 July 2015	Christian Nadé	Raith Rovers	Hamilton Academical	Free
13 July 2015	Antons Kurakins	Ventspils	Hamilton Academical	Free
13 July 2015	Gramoz Kurtaj	Banik Most	Hamilton Academical	Free
13 July 2015	Carlton Morris	Norwich City	Hamilton Academical	Loan
13 July 2015	Nicolas Šumský	Hamilton Academical	Airdrieonians	Loan
13 July 2015	Dani López	La Roda	Inverness Caledonian Thistle	Free
14 July 2015	Bob McHugh	Motherwell	Falkirk	Free
14 July 2015	Morgyn Neill	Motherwell	Livingston	Free
14 July 2015	Moses Duckrell	Barnet	Livingston	Free
14 July 2015	Nigel Hasselbaink	Hamilton Academical	Excelsior	Free
15 July 2015	Mo Yaqub	St Mirren	Cowdenbeath	Free
15 July 2015	Jordan Thompson	Manchester United	Rangers	Free
15 July 2015	Blair Currie	Hamilton Academical	Annan Athletic	Free
16 July 2015	Liam Craig	Hibernian	St Johnstone	Free
16 July 2015	Kieran Kennedy	Leicester City	Motherwell	Free
16 July 2015	Amido Balde	Celtic	Metz	Free
16 July 2015	Owain Fôn Williams	Tranmere Rovers	Inverness Caledonian Thistle	Free
16 July 2015	Dale Keenan	Partick Thistle	Stranraer	Free
16 July 2015	Paul Cairney	Kilmarnock	Stranraer	Free
17 July 2015	Marvin Bartley	Leyton Orient	Hibernian	Free
17 July 2015	Joe Cardle	Ross County	Dunfermline Athletic	Free
18 July 2015	Andy Halliday	Bradford City	Rangers	Free
19 July 2015	Paul Watson	Raith Rovers	Falkirk	Free
20 July 2015	Martin Scott	Raith Rovers	Salgaocar	Free
20 July 2015	Gary Miller	St Johnstone	Partick Thistle	Free
20 July 2015	Darko Bodul	Rheindorf Altach	Dundee United	Free
20 July 2015	James Tavernier	Wigan Athletic	Rangers	Undisclosed
20 July 2015	Martyn Waghorn	Wigan Athletic	Rangers	Undisclosed
20 July 2015	Steve Simonsen	Rangers	Pune City	Free
20 July 2015	Euan Smith	Kilmarnock	Brechin City	Free
22 July 2015	Igor Rossi Branco	Marítimo	Heart of Midlothian	Free
22 July 2015	Jason Holt	Heart of Midlothian	Rangers	Compensation
22 July 2015	Yoann Arquin	St Mirren	1461 Trabzon	Free
23 July 2015	Luke Conlan	Burnley	St Mirren	Loan
23 July 2015	Ross Caldwell	Greenock Morton	Ayr United	Free
24 July 2015	Cameron Howieson	Burnley	St Mirren	Free
24 July 2015	Kevin McBride	Dundee	Airdrieonians	Free
24 July 2015	Jamie Lindsay	Celtic	Dumbarton	Loan
24 July 2015	Andrew Driver	Aberdeen	De Graafschap	Free
25 July 2015	Rodney Sneijder	Almere City	Dundee United	Free
26 July 2015	Rubén Palazuelos	Ross County	CD Guijuelo	Free
28 July 2015	Jackson Irvine	Celtic	Ross County	Compensation
28 July 2015	Daniel Bachmann	Stoke City	Ross County	Loan
30 July 2015	Andréa Mbuyi-Mutombo	Fréjus Saint-Raphaël	Inverness Caledonian Thistle	Free
30 July 2015	Jim McAlister	Dundee	Blackpool	Free
31 July 2015	John McGinn	St Mirren	Hibernian	Compensation
31 July 2015	Connor Ripley	Middlesbrough	Motherwell	Loan
31 July 2015	Denny Johnstone	Birmingham City	Greenock Morton	Loan
1 August 2015	Juwon Oshaniwa	Ashdod	Heart of Midlothian	Free
3 August 2015	Mathias Pogba	Crawley Town	Partick Thistle	Free
3 August 2015	Bilel Mohsni	Rangers	Angers	Free
4 August 2015	Stephen McGinn	Dundee	Wycombe Wanderers	Free
4 August 2015	Calum Gallagher	Rangers	St Mirren	Free
7 August 2015	Alexei Eremenko	Kilmarnock	FF Jaro	Free
8 August 2015	Iain Davidson	Dundee	Raith Rovers	Free
11 August 2015	Jake Taylor	Reading	Motherwell	Loan
11 August 2015	Oliver Davies	Swansea City	Kilmarnock	Loan
12 August 2015	Iain Vigurs	Motherwell	Inverness Caledonian Thistle	Free
12 August 2015	Dylan Easton	St Johnstone	Elgin City	Free
12 August 2015	Edward Ofere	Inverness Caledonian Thistle	Boluspor	Free
13 August 2015	Jamie Langfield	Aberdeen	St Mirren	Free
13 August 2015	Kyle Hutton	Rangers	Queen of the South	Free
13 August 2015	Paul Heffernan	Dundee	Queen of the South	Free
13 August 2015	Nathan Oduwa	Tottenham Hotspur	Rangers	Loan
13 August 2015	Dominic Ball	Tottenham Hotspur	Rangers	Loan
14 August 2015	Jeroen Tesselaar	St Mirren	De Graafschap	Free
14 August 2015	Scott Allan	Hibernian	Celtic	£275,000
14 August 2015	Liam Henderson	Celtic	Hibernian	Loan
15 August 2015	Ryan Sinnamon	Rangers	Falkirk	Loan
17 August 2015	Botti Biabi	Falkirk	Swansea City	Undisclosed
17 August 2015	Lee Miller	Kilmarnock	Falkirk	Free
18 August 2015	Adam Cummins	Motherwell	Bangor City	Free
19 August 2015	Hugo Faria	Apollon Smyrnis	Livingston	Free
20 August 2015	Josh Parker	Red Star Belgrade	Aberdeen	Loan
20 August 2015	Keith Watson	Dundee United	St Mirren	Free
21 August 2015	Alex Harris	Hibernian	Queen of the South	Loan
21 August 2015	Dylan McGeouch	Celtic	Hibernian	Undisclosed
23 August 2015	Gedion Zelalem	Arsenal	Rangers	Loan
24 August 2015	Jon Daly	Rangers	Raith Rovers	Free
25 August 2015	Darren McGregor	Rangers	Hibernian	Free
25 August 2015	Rodney Sneijder	Dundee United	Jong FC Utrecht	Free
25 August 2015	Darnell Fisher	Celtic	St Johnstone	Loan
26 August 2015	Frazer Wright	St Johnstone	Dumbarton	Free
26 August 2015	Steven Ross	Ross County	Dumbarton	Free
26 August 2015	Lawrence Shankland	Aberdeen	St Mirren	Loan
26 August 2015	Aldin El-Zubaidi	Hamilton Academical	Cowdenbeath	Free
26 August 2015	Alexandre D'Acol	AEK Athens	Hamilton Academical	Free
26 August 2015	Scott Smith	Dundee United	Airdrieonians	Loan
28 August 2015	Marius Žaliūkas	Rangers	Žalgiris	Free
28 August 2015	Andy Webster	Coventry City	St Mirren	Free
28 August 2015	Luka Tankulić	Dundee	Sportfreunde Lotte	Free
28 August 2015	Philip Roberts	Dundee	Sligo Rovers	Free
28 August 2015	Billy Mckay	Wigan Athletic	Dundee United	Loan
28 August 2015	Theo Robinson	Doncaster Rovers	Motherwell	Free
29 August 2015	Ryan McLaughlin	Liverpool	Aberdeen	Loan
29 August 2015	Tyler Blackett	Manchester United	Celtic	Loan
31 August 2015	Riccardo Calder	Aston Villa	Dundee	Loan
31 August 2015	Martin Woods	Shrewsbury Town	Ross County	Free
31 August 2015	Stefan Šćepović	Celtic	Getafe	Loan
31 August 2015	Łukasz Załuska	Celtic	Darmstadt 98	Free
1 September 2015	Robbie Muirhead	Dundee United	Partick Thistle	Loan
1 September 2015	Virgil van Dijk	Celtic	Southampton	£13,000,000
1 September 2015	Islam Feruz	Chelsea	Hibernian	Loan
1 September 2015	Henri Anier	Dundee United	Hibernian	Loan
1 September 2015	Robbie Crawford	Rangers	Alloa Athletic	Loan
1 September 2015	Andy Murdoch	Rangers	Cowdenbeath	Loan
1 September 2015	Miles Storey	Swindon Town	Inverness Caledonian Thistle	Loan
1 September 2015	Tobi Sho-Silva	Charlton Athletic	Inverness Caledonian Thistle	Loan
1 September 2015	Adam Taggart	Fulham	Dundee United	Loan
1 September 2015	Aaron Kuhl	Reading	Dundee United	Loan
1 September 2015	Rhys Healey	Cardiff City	Dundee	Loan
1 September 2015	Jack Hendry	Partick Thistle	Wigan Athletic	Undisclosed
1 September 2015	Ryan Christie	Inverness Caledonian Thistle	Celtic	Undisclosed
1 September 2015	Jozo Šimunović	Dinamo Zagreb	Celtic	Undisclosed
1 September 2015	Ryan Christie	Celtic	Inverness Caledonian Thistle	Loan
1 September 2015	Eoghan O'Connell	Celtic	Oldham Athletic	Loan
1 September 2015	Kevin McHattie	Heart of Midlothian	Kilmarnock	Free
1 September 2015	Gary Oliver	Heart of Midlothian	Queen of the South	Undisclosed
1 September 2015	Liam Grimshaw	Manchester United	Motherwell	Loan
1 September 2015	Gary Woods	Leyton Orient	Ross County	Loan
1 September 2015	Alex Samuel	Swansea City	Greenock Morton	Loan
1 September 2015	Devlin MacKay	Kilmarnock	Derby County	Loan

== See also ==
- List of Scottish football transfers winter 2014–15
- List of Scottish football transfers winter 2015–16
