= List of Scottish football transfers winter 2013–14 =

This is a list of Scottish football transfers featuring at least one 2013–14 Scottish Premiership club or one 2013–14 Scottish Championship club which were completed after the end of the summer 2013 transfer window and before the end of the 2013–14 season.

== September 2013 – May 2014 ==
Date	Name	Moving from	Moving to	Fee
20 September 2013	Ismael Bouzid	USM Alger	Kilmarnock	Free
21 September 2013	Tom Hateley	Motherwell	Tranmere Rovers	Free
10 October 2013	Morgaro Gomis	Birmingham City	Dundee United	Free
11 October 2011	Stephen Hughes	Aberdeen	East Fife	Free
19 October 2013	Darren Petrie	Dundee United	Brechin City	Loan
23 October 2013	Sanel Jahic	Karabükspor	St Johnstone	Free
24 October 2013	Marian Kello	Wolverhampton Wanderers	St Mirren	Free
26 October 2013	Grant Munro	Ross County	Brora Rangers	Free
31 October 2013	Mark Millar	Dundee United	Falkirk	Loan
7 November 2013	Craig Storie	Aberdeen	Forfar Athletic	Loan
26 November 2013	Lee Croft	Oldham Athletic	St Johnstone	Free
26 November 2013	Caolan McAleer	Partick Thistle	Airdrieonians	Loan
12 December 2013	Dan Twardzik	Dundee	Motherwell	Loan
16 December 2013	Ivan Sproule	Ross County	Linfield	Free
26 December 2013	Adam Campbell	Newcastle United	St Mirren	Loan
30 December 2013	Lyle Taylor	Sheffield United	Partick Thistle	Loan
1 January 2014	Hólmbert Friðjónsson	Fram Reykjavik	Celtic	£100,000
1 January 2014	Jordan Slew	Blackburn Rovers	Ross County	Loan
3 January 2014	David Robertson	St Johnstone	Greenock Morton	Free
3 January 2014	Evangelos Ikonomou	Veria	Ross County	Free
3 January 2014	Michael Tidser	Rotherham United	Ross County	Loan
3 January 2014	Alan Tate	Swansea City	Aberdeen	Loan
3 January 2014	Michael O'Halloran	Bolton Wanderers	St Johnstone	Free
3 January 2014	Gary Harkins	St Mirren	Oldham Athletic	Loan
8 January 2014	Filip Kiss	Cardiff City	Ross County	Loan
8 January 2014	Farid El Alagui	Brentford	Dundee United	Loan
9 January 2014	Adam Cummins	Motherwell	Dundee	Loan
10 January 2014	Fraser Mullen	Hibernian	Raith Rovers	Free
10 January 2014	Ross Caldwell	Hibernian	Alloa Athletic	Loan
10 January 2014	Gary Fraser	Bolton Wanderers	Partick Thistle	Free
10 January 2014	Henri Anier	Viking	Motherwell	Free
14 January 2014	Robert McHugh	Motherwell	Queen of the South	Loan
14 January 2014	Paul George	Celtic	Hamilton Academical	Loan
15 January 2014	Stefan Johansen	Strømsgodset	Celtic	£2 million
15 January 2014	Gregg Wylde	Aberdeen	St Mirren	Free
15 January 2014	Yoann Arquin	Notts County	Ross County	Free
17 January 2014	Lee Mair	St Mirren	Partick Thistle	Free
17 January 2014	Greg Tansey	Stevenage	Inverness Caledonian Thistle	Free
17 January 2014	James Fowler	Kilmarnock	Cowdenbeath	Loan
18 January 2014	Yann Songo'o	Blackburn Rovers	Ross County	Loan
20 January 2014	Chris Erskine	Dundee United	Partick Thistle	Loan
21 January 2014	Tom Rogić	Celtic	Melbourne Victory	Loan
22 January 2014	Kyle Jacobs	Kilmarnock	Livingston	Free
23 January 2014	Adam Rooney	Oldham Athletic	Aberdeen	Free
23 January 2014	Chris Iwelumo	Scunthorpe United	St Johnstone	Free
23 January 2014	Reuben Gabriel	Kilmarnock	Waasland-Beveren	Free
24 January 2014	Bahrudin Atajic	Celtic	Shrewsbury Town	Loan
24 January 2014	Vitalijs Maksimenko	Brighton & Hove Albion	Kilmarnock	Loan
27 January 2014	James Dunne	Stevenage	St Johnstone	Loan
28 January 2014	Alexei Eremenko	FC Kairat	Kilmarnock	Free
28 January 2014	Adam King	Heart of Midlothian	Swansea City	Undisclosed
28 January 2014	Mark McGuigan	Partick Thistle	Albion Rovers	Free
30 January 2014	Josh Magennis	Aberdeen	St Mirren	Loan
30 January 2014	Shaleum Logan	Brentford	Aberdeen	Loan
30 January 2014	Paul McCallum	West Ham United	Heart of Midlothian	Loan
30 January 2014	John Baird	Partick Thistle	Raith Rovers	Free
30 January 2014	Dylan McGeouch	Celtic	Coventry City	Loan
31 January 2014	George Moncur	West Ham United	Partick Thistle	Loan
31 January 2014	Prince Buaben	Carlisle United	Partick Thistle	Loan
31 January 2014	David Moberg Karlsson	Sunderland	Kilmarnock	Loan
31 January 2014	Jude Winchester	Kilmarnock	Cliftonville	Loan
31 January 2014	Curtis Good	Newcastle United	Dundee United	Loan
31 January 2014	Erik Cikos	Slovan Bratislava	Ross County	Loan
31 January 2014	Daniel Boateng	Arsenal	Hibernian	Loan
31 January 2014	Danny Haynes	Notts County	Hibernian	Loan
31 January 2014	Duncan Watmore	Sunderland	Hibernian	Loan
31 January 2014	Mark Davies	Nottingham Forest	St Johnstone	Loan
31 January 2014	Fisayo Adarabioyo	Birmingham City	St Johnstone	Free
31 January 2014	Danny Grainger	St Mirren	Dunfermline Athletic	Free
31 January 2014	Ross Forbes	Partick Thistle	Dunfermline Athletic	Free
31 January 2014	Leigh Griffiths	Wolverhampton Wanderers	Celtic	Undisclosed
31 January 2014	Rowan Vine	Hibernian	Greenock Morton	Free
31 January 2014	Joe Ledley	Celtic	Crystal Palace	Undisclosed
4 February 2014	Chris Clark	Aberdeen	Cove Rangers	Free
5 February 2014	Eric Djemba-Djemba	Partizan Belgrade	St Mirren	Free
21 February 2014	Craig Reid	Greenock Morton	Motherwell	Free
21 February 2014	Kevin Luckassen	Ross County	Slovan Liberec	£100,000

== See also ==
- List of Scottish football transfers summer 2013
- List of Scottish football transfers summer 2014
