= 2015–16 St Mirren F.C. season =

St Mirren
2015–16 season
- Chairman: Stewart Gilmour
- Manager: Ian Murray (until 12 December); Alex Rae (from 19 December)
- Stadium: St Mirren Park
- Championship: 6th
- Challenge Cup: Semi-final lost to Rangers
- League Cup: Second round lost to Livingston
- Scottish Cup: Fourth round lost to Partick Thistle
- Top goalscorer: League: Stevie Mallan (11 goals); All: Stevie Mallan (14 goals)
- Highest home attendance: 5,933 vs Rangers (1 May 2016)
- Lowest home attendance: 2,321 vs Falkirk (1 March 2016)
- Average home league attendance: 3,549
Home colours	Away colours

The 2015–16 season is the club's first season in the Scottish Championship and their first appearance in the second tier of Scottish football since 2005–06 season. St Mirren will also compete in the Challenge Cup, the League Cup and the Scottish Cup.

== Month by month review ==
=== May ===
On 29 May 2015, new manager Ian Murray announced the departure of Yoann Arquin, Marián Kello, Jeroen Tesselaar, Mark Williams and Mo Yaqub. Loan signings James Dayton and Emmanuel Sonupe also left the club today.

=== June ===
On 1 June, former manager Gary Teale left the club by 'mutual consent'. Teale played for the club for four seasons, and managed for a six-month period.

On 8 June, it was confirmed that Gregg Wylde, Viktor Genev and youngster Adam Brown have now left the club. Along with the other recent departures, it means eleven players have now left the club following relegation.

On 14 June, chairman Stewart Gilmour confirmed that midfielder John McGinn has started legal action against the club, following a previous training ground incident in which he was 'speared' by teammate Steven Thompson.

On 16 June, midfielder Alan Gow signed a new one-year deal with the club.

On 25 June, midfielder Scott Agnew signed a new one-year deal with the club, after leaving Dumbarton when his contract expired.

On 26 June, club captain Steven Thompson signed a new one-year deal with the club.

On 29 June, midfielder Stuart Carswell signed a one-year deal with the club, after leaving Motherwell in the summer.

=== July ===
On 3 July, Saints signed 19-year-old Paul McMullan on a one-year loan deal from Celtic. McMullan can play as a forward or as a wide player.

On 20 July, the club announced the departure of Thomas Reilly after he failed to win a new contract during pre-season. Reilly leaves Saints after four years, having made 47 appearances and scoring once.

On 23 July, defender Luke Conlan signed for the club on a one-year loan deal from Burnley.

On 24 July, the club signed former Burnley midfielder Cameron Howieson on a one-year deal. The 20-year-old is a New Zealand international.

On 31 July, midfielder John McGinn left the club, joining Hibernian on a four-year deal.

=== August ===
On 3 August, Saints were drawn at home to Livingston in the 2nd Round of the Scottish League Cup.

On 4 August, striker Calum Gallagher signed on a one-year contract from Rangers. The 20-year-old will wear the number 22 shirt.

On 13 August, Saints signed goalkeeper Jamie Langfield on a two-year contract from Aberdeen. Langfield takes up a player-coach role.

On 19 August, it was confirmed that defender Jason Naismith had suffered serious knee ligament damage in the recent 2–1 home defeat to Dumbarton in the Scottish Championship. He is expected to be out for a period of six-months.

On 20 August. former Dundee United defender Keith Watson signed a six-month deal with the club. He was assigned squad number 20.

Also on this day, Saints were drawn at home to League One side Dunfermline Athletic in the Quarter-finals of the Challenge Cup. The tie will be played on 10 October 2015.

On 26 August, Saints signed 20-year-old striker Lawrence Shankland on a one-year loan deal from Aberdeen.

On 28 August, veteran defender Andy Webster signed a one-year deal with Saints with the option of a further year.

=== September ===
On 2 September, Saints signed 19-year-old striker Jaison McGrath after he was released by Celtic.

On 22 September, goalkeeper Mark Ridgers joined Kilmarnock on an emergency loan deal until January 2016. This was due to a goalkeeping crisis at the Ayrshire club, leaving them with no available stopper for their upcoming matches.

=== October ===
On 12 October, Saints were drawn away to either Rangers or Livingston in the Semi-finals of the Scottish Challenge Cup.

On 30 October, defender Craig Reid signed an emergency three-month loan with the club, after it was confirmed that defender Keith Watson had suffered ankle ligament damage.

=== November ===
On 2 November, assistant manager Mark Spalding left the club by mutual consent, following Saints poor run of form since the start of the season.

On 3 November, former Saints manager Alex Miller was appointed new assistant manager to Ian Murray.

=== December ===
On 1 December, Saints were drawn at home to Partick Thistle in the fourth round of the Scottish Cup. The tie will be played 9/10 January 2016

On 12 December, manager Ian Murray resigned after a 1–0 defeat to Dumbarton. Saints had won just two league matches since Murray was appointed in the summer.

On 19 December, Saints appointed Alex Rae as new club manager. He was given an initial 18-month contract, tying him to the club until the summer of 2017.

On 29 December, defender Keith Watson extended his short term deal until the end of the season.

=== January ===
On 1 January, the club named David Farrell as assistant manager to Alex Rae.

On 2 January, manager Alex Rae confirmed that loanees Luke Conlan and Craig Reid had returned to their parent clubs.

On 14 January, goalkeeper Mark Ridgers left the club by mutual consent, after his loan at Kilmarnock expired.

On 15 January, midfielder Rocco Quinn signed for Saints from Ross County, until the end of the season. He was assigned squad number 27.

On 27 January, striker David Clarkson signed on loan for the club until the end of the season from Motherwell. He has been assigned squad number 24.

On 29 January, midfielder Alex Cooper signed until the end of the season after being released by Falkirk.

On the same day defender Gary Irvine signed until the summer of 2017, after being released by Dundee.

Also on this day, youngster Lewis McLear joined Scottish League Two side Stirling Albion on loan until the end of the season.

=== February ===
On 1 February, Celtic loanee Paul McMullan returned to his parent club, as Saints ended his loan spell early. In total he played 22 games for the club, scoring once.

=== April ===
On 30 April, Rocco Quinn signed a two-year contract extension, tying him to the club until the summer of 2018.

== Results & fixtures ==
Win Draw Loss Postponed

=== Pre season / Friendlies ===
7 July 2015 Friendly (Closed Doors)	St Mirren	0–1	Ayr United	Ralston Training Complex
19:00			Trouten pen'

11 July 2015 Friendly	Inverness Caledonian Thistle	1–1	St Mirren	Caledonian Stadium
15:00	Tansey 11'	Report	Gow 29'	Referee: Stephen Finnie

15 July 2015 Friendly (Closed Doors)	St Mirren	1–0	Oldham Athletic	Stirling University Training Complex
19:00	McLear 58'	Oldham Athletic report

18 July 2015 Friendly	St Mirren	0–1	Bradford City	St Mirren Park
14:00		Report	Clarke 14'	Attendance: 1,965; Referee: Colin Steven

22 July 2015 Friendly (Closed Doors)	St Mirren	0–3	Burnley	St Mirren Park
13:00		Report	O'Neill; Taylor

1 August 2015 Friendly	Sheffield Wednesday	5–0	St Mirren	Hillsborough Stadium
15:00	Sasso 21'; Nuhiu 30', 49'; McGugan 40'; Vermijl 83'	Report		Attendance: 9,330; Referee: Craig Pawson

=== Scottish Championship ===
7 August 2015 1	Rangers	3–1	St Mirren	Ibrox Stadium
19:45	Wallace 4', 26'; Shiels 90'	BBC Report	Howieson 28'	Attendance: 49,216; Referee: Kevin Clancy

15 August 2015 2	St Mirren	1–2	Dumbarton	St Mirren Park
15:00	Agnew 63'	BBC Report	Gibson 26'; Fleming 85' (pen.)	Attendance: 3,806; Referee: John Beaton

21 August 2015 3	Greenock Morton	0–0	St Mirren	Cappielow
19:45		BBC Report		Attendance: 5,343; Referee: Greg Aitken

29 August 2015 4	St Mirren	1–1	Livingston	St Mirren Park
15:00	McMullan 4'	BBC Report	Buchanan 22' (pen.)	Attendance: 3,018; Referee: John McKendrick

5 September 2015 5	Queen of the South	0–2	St Mirren	Palmerston Park
15:00		BBC Report	Kelly 7'; Thompson 29'	Attendance: 2,001; Referee: Stephen Finnie

12 September 2015 6	St Mirren	2–3	Falkirk	St Mirren Park
15:00	Agnew 3'; Mallan 38'	BBC Report	Leahy 55'; Baird 72' (pen.), 90'	Attendance: 3,412; Referee: John Beaton

18 September 2015 7	St Mirren	1–2	Raith Rovers	St Mirren Park
19:45	Shankland 45'	BBC Report	Craigen 12'; Daly 87'	Attendance: 2,877; Referee: Euan Anderson

26 September 2015 8	Hibernian	1–1	St Mirren	Easter Road
15:00	Boyle 42'	BBC Report	Gallagher 18'	Attendance: 8,911; Referee: Crawford Allan

3 October 2015 9	St Mirren	1–1	Alloa Athletic	St Mirren Park
15:00	Shankland 68'	BBC Report	Marr 75'	Attendance: 2,994; Referee: Craig Charleston

17 October 2015 10	Livingston	0–1	St Mirren	Almondvale Stadium
15:00		BBC Report	Mallan 12'	Attendance: 1,199; Referee: Don Robertson

25 October 2015 11	St Mirren	0–1	Rangers	St Mirren Park
12:30		BBC Report	Holt 25'	Attendance: 5,477; Referee: Steven McLean

31 October 2015 12	Falkirk	3–0	St Mirren	Falkirk Stadium
15:00	Sibbald 18'; Baird 43'; Vaulks 76'	BBC Report		Attendance: 4,239; Referee: Greg Aitken

7 November 2015 13	St Mirren	1–4	Hibernian	St Mirren Park
15:00	Kelly 8'	BBC Report	Cummings 10'; Keatings 37', 41', 78' (pen.)

20 November 2015 14	St Mirren	1–1	Greenock Morton	St Mirren Park
19:45	Baird 11'	BBC Report	Samuel 90'	Attendance: 4,163; Referee: John Beaton

24 November 2015 15	Raith Rovers	1–1	St Mirren	Stark's Park
19:45	Stewart 39'	BBC Report	Mallan 88'	Attendance: 1,264; Referee: John McKendrick

5 December 2015	St Mirren	P – P	Queen of the South	St Mirren Park
15:00

12 December 2015 16	Dumbarton	1–0	St Mirren	Cheaper Insurance Direct Stadium
15:00	Fleming 50'	BBC Report		Attendance: 1,142; Referee: Nick Walsh

19 December 2015 17	Alloa Athletic	0–2	St Mirren	Indodrill Stadium
15:00		BBC Report	Shankland 13'; Gallagher 59'	Attendance: 912; Referee: Alan Muir

26 December 2015 18	St Mirren	1–4	Livingston	St Mirren Park
15:00	Shankland 41'	BBC Report	Buchanan 23', 66'; Gordon 32'; Glen 54'	Attendance: 2,952; Referee: Stephen Finnie

2 January 2016 19	Greenock Morton	0–1	St Mirren	Cappielow
15:00		BBC Report	Shankland 39'	Attendance: 4,736; Referee: Andrew Dallas

16 January 2016	St Mirren	P – P	Raith Rovers	St Mirren Park
15:00

23 January 2016 20	Hibernian	3–1	St Mirren	Easter Road
15:00	Henderson 10'; McGinn 44'; Stokes 90'	BBC Report	Mallan 45+2'	Attendance: 10,160; Referee: Don Robertson

30 January 2016 21	St Mirren	3–1	Alloa Athletic	St Mirren Park
15:00	Watson 37'; Gallagher 59'; Mallan 90+3'	BBC Report	Layne 9' (pen.)	Attendance: 2,589; Referee: Craig Charleston

6 February 2016 22	St Mirren	1–0	Queen of the South	St Mirren Park
15:00	Mallan 25'	BBC Report		Attendance: 2,706; Referee: Crawford Allan

13 February 2016 23	Queen of the South	1–0	St Mirren	Palmerston Park
15:00	Harris 65'	BBC Report		Attendance: 1,923; Referee: Barry Cook

20 February 2016 24	St Mirren	1–0	Dumbarton	St Mirren Park
15:00	Shankland 63'	BBC Report		Attendance: 2,792; Referee: John Beaton

27 February 2016 25	Rangers	1–0	St Mirren	Ibrox Stadium
15:00	Forrester 86'	BBC Report		Attendance: 46,366; Referee: John McKendrick

1 March 2016 26	St Mirren	0–0	Falkirk	St Mirren Park
19:45		BBC Report		Attendance: 2,321; Referee: Euan Anderson

5 March 2016 27	Raith Rovers	4–3	St Mirren	Stark's Park
15:00	Hardie 3', 53', 55'; Stewart 24'	BBC Report	Watson 41', 76'; Clarkson 61'	Attendance: 1,888; Referee: John Beaton

12 March 2016 28	St Mirren	2–1	Queen of the South	St Mirren Park
15:00	Mallan 30' (pen.); Tapping 63' (o.g)	BBC Report	Oliver 62'	Attendance: 3,888; Referee: Alan Muir

19 March 2016 29	Livingston	2–3	St Mirren	Almondvale Stadium
15:00	Buchanan 16'; White 53'	BBC Report	Mallan 15' (pen.); Shankland 35', 72'	Attendance: 1,228; Referee: Crawford Allan

22 March 2016 30	St Mirren	1–2	Raith Rovers	St Mirren Park
19:45	Cooper 43'	BBC Report	Connolly 22'; Callachan 36'	Attendance: 2,381; Referee: Barry Cook

26 March 2016 31	Alloa Athletic	0–1	St Mirren	Indodrill Stadium
15:00		BBC Report	Watson 85'	Attendance: 753; Referee: Mat Northcroft

2 April 2016 32	St Mirren	2–2	Hibernian	St Mirren Park
15:00	Quinn 35'; Shankland 57'	BBC Report	Cummings 27'; El Alagui 89'	Attendance: 3,765; Referee: Craig Charleston

9 April 2016 33	Falkirk	3–2	St Mirren	Falkirk Stadium
15:00	Lee Miller 9'; McHugh 70'; Alston 90'	BBC Report	Mallan 56', 82'	Attendance: 4,331; Referee: Andrew Dallas

16 April 2016 34	St Mirren	3–1	Greenock Morton	St Mirren Park
15:00	Shankland 7'; Gallagher 62'; Mallan 90+2'	BBC Report	Johnstone 59'	Attendance: 4,299; Referee: Willie Collum

23 April 2016 35	Dumbarton	2–1	St Mirren	Cheaper Insurance Direct Stadium
15:00	Watson 40' (o.g); Fleming 54'	BBC Report	Gallagher 10'	Attendance: 1,387; Referee: Kevin Graham

1 May 2016 36	St Mirren	2–2	Rangers	St Mirren Park
12:30	Gallagher 40'; Morgan 90+2'	BBC Report	Miller 54'; Holt 88'	Attendance: 5,933; Referee: Don Robertson

=== Scottish Challenge Cup ===
25 July 2015 First round	St Mirren	3–1	Berwick Rangers	St Mirren Park
15:00	Thompson 19' (pen.); Agnew 50', 61'	BBC Report	Henderson 6'	Attendance: 2,394; Referee: Alan Muir

18 August 2015 Second round	Annan Athletic	1–2	St Mirren	Galabank
19:45	Weatherson 1' (pen.)	BBC Report	Stewart 50'; Gow 66'	Attendance: 794; Referee: Don Robertson

10 October 2015 Quarter-final	St Mirren	4–0	Dunfermline Athletic	St Mirren Park
15:00	Gallagher 10'; Mallan 23', 88'; Agnew 37'	BBC Report		Attendance: 2,339; Referee: George Salmond

28 November 2015 Semi-final	Rangers	4–0	St Mirren	Ibrox Stadium
12:15	Holt 34'; Miller 77'; Waghorn 84'; Kelly 90' (o.g.)	BBC Report		Attendance: 22,369; Referee: Bobby Madden

=== Scottish League Cup ===
25 August 2015 Second round	St Mirren	2–3	Livingston	St Mirren Park
19:45	Gallagher 16'; Mallan 45'	BBC Report	Buchanan 41'; Mullen 45'; Gallagher 84'	Attendance: 1,568; Referee: Brian Colvin

=== Scottish Cup ===
8 January 2015 Fourth round	St Mirren	1–2	Partick Thistle	St Mirren Park
19:30	Watson 88'	BBC Report	Seaborne 62'; Amoo 73'	Attendance: 4,572; Referee: Craig Thomson

== Player statistics ==
=== Captains ===
No.	P	Name	Country	No. games	Notes
4	DF	Andy Webster	(Scotland)	24	
9	FW	Steven Thompson	(Scotland)	12	Club captain
6	MF	Jim Goodwin	(Republic of Ireland)	4	
2	DF	Jason Naismith	(Scotland)	1	
27	MF	Rocco Quinn	(Scotland)	1	

Last updated: 2 May 2016
Source: Competitive match reports.
Competitive matches only
Matches started as captain only
Country: FIFA nationality; No.: Squad number; P: Position; Name: Player name; No. Games: Number of games started as captain.

=== Squad information ===
Last updated 2 May 2016

No.	Pos	Nat	Player	Total		Championship		Challenge Cup		League Cup		Scottish Cup	
No.	Pos	Nat	Player	Apps	Goals	Apps	Goals	Apps	Goals	Apps	Goals	Apps	Goals
2	DF	(Scotland) SCO	Jason Naismith	6	0	5+0	0	1+0	0	0+0	0	0+0	0
3	DF	(Scotland) SCO	Sean Kelly	32	2	23+3	2	4+0	0	1+0	0	1+0	0
4	DF	(Scotland) SCO	Andy Webster	35	0	32+0	0	2+0	0	0+0	0	1+0	0
6	MF	(Republic of Ireland) IRL	Jim Goodwin	20	0	11+5	0	2+1	0	1+0	0	0+0	0
8	MF	(Scotland) SCO	Alan Gow	9	1	2+6	0	1+0	1	0+0	0	0+0	0
9	FW	(Scotland) SCO	Steven Thompson	34	2	9+20	1	2+1	1	1+0	0	0+1	0
10	MF	(Scotland) SCO	Stuart Carswell	24	0	15+5	0	2+0	0	0+1	0	1+0	0
11	MF	(New Zealand) NZL	Cameron Howieson	20	1	10+5	1	2+1	0	1+0	0	1+0	0
12	GK	(Scotland) SCO	Jamie Langfield	39	0	34+0	0	3+0	0	1+0	0	1+0	0
14	MF	(Scotland) SCO	Stevie Mallan	40	14	32+2	11	4+0	2	1+0	1	1+0	0
15	DF	(Scotland) SCO	Jack Baird	37	1	30+1	1	4+0	0	1+0	0	1+0	0
16	MF	(Scotland) SCO	Scott Agnew	28	5	22+1	2	3+1	3	0+0	0	1+0	0
17	MF	(Scotland) SCO	Lewis Morgan	21	1	1+16	1	1+2	0	1+0	0	0+0	0
18	MF	(Scotland) SCO	Lewis McLear	7	0	1+2	0	2+2	0	0+0	0	0+0	0
19	MF	(Scotland) SCO	Barry Cuddihy	6	0	1+2	0	1+1	0	0+1	0	0+0	0
20	DF	(Scotland) SCO	Keith Watson	29	5	26+0	4	1+0	0	1+0	0	1+0	1
21	FW	(Scotland) SCO	Jaison McGrath	2	0	0+2	0	0+0	0	0+0	0	0+0	0
22	FW	(Scotland) SCO	Calum Gallagher	41	8	33+3	6	3+0	1	1+0	1	0+1	0
24	FW	(Scotland) SCO	David Clarkson	12	1	12+0	1	0+0	0	0+0	0	0+0	0
25	FW	(Scotland) SCO	Lawrence Shankland	32	10	27+4	10	0+0	0	0+0	0	1+0	0
27	MF	(Scotland) SCO	Rocco Quinn	13	1	13+0	1	0+0	0	0+0	0	0+0	0
28	DF	(Scotland) SCO	Gary Irvine	16	0	15+1	0	0+0	0	0+0	0	0+0	0
29	MF	(Scotland) SCO	Alex Cooper	12	1	11+1	1	0+0	0	0+0	0	0+0	0
33	DF	(Scotland) SCO	Jordan Stewart	18	1	6+7	0	1+2	1	1+0	0	0+1	0
37	MF	(Scotland) SCO	Kyle McAllister	4	0	2+2	0	0+0	0	0+0	0	0+0	0
Players who left the club during the season:
1	GK	(Scotland) SCO	Mark Ridgers	3	0	2+0	0	1+0	0	0+0	0	0+0	0
5	DF	(Northern Ireland) NIR	Luke Conlan	4	0	3+0	0	1+0	0	0+0	0	0+0	0
7	FW	(Scotland) SCO	Paul McMullan	22	1	12+5	1	2+1	0	0+1	0	1+0	0
26	DF	(Scotland) SCO	Craig Reid	7	0	6+0	0	1+0	0	0+0	0	0+0	0

=== Disciplinary record ===
Includes all competitive matches.

Last updated 2 May 2016

Number	Nation	Position	Name	Championship		Challenge Cup		League Cup		Scottish Cup		Total	
Number	Nation	Position	Name	Booked	Sent off (straight red)	Booked	Sent off (straight red)	Booked	Sent off (straight red)	Booked	Sent off (straight red)	Booked	Sent off (straight red)
2	(Scotland)	DF	Jason Naismith	1	0	0	0	0	0	0	0	1	0
3	(Scotland)	MF	Sean Kelly	3	0	1	0	0	0	0	0	4	0
4	(Scotland)	DF	Andy Webster	4	0	0	0	0	0	0	0	4	0
6	(Republic of Ireland)	MF	Jim Goodwin	6	0	0	0	1	0	0	0	7	0
8	(Scotland)	MF	Alan Gow	0	0	0	0	0	0	0	0	0	0
9	(Scotland)	FW	Steven Thompson	2	0	1	0	0	0	0	0	3	0
10	(Scotland)	MF	Stuart Carswell	3	0	0	0	1	0	0	0	4	0
11	(New Zealand)	MF	Cameron Howieson	0	0	0	0	1	0	0	0	1	0
12	(Scotland)	GK	Jamie Langfield	2	0	0	0	0	0	0	0	2	0
14	(Scotland)	MF	Stevie Mallan	3	1	1	0	0	0	1	0	5	1
15	(Scotland)	DF	Jack Baird	6	0	0	0	0	0	0	0	6	0
16	(Scotland)	MF	Scott Agnew	3	0	0	0	0	0	0	0	3	0
17	(Scotland)	MF	Lewis Morgan	1	0	0	0	0	0	0	0	1	0
18	(Scotland)	MF	Lewis McLear	0	0	0	0	0	0	0	0	0	0
19	(Scotland)	MF	Barry Cuddihy	0	0	0	0	0	0	0	0	0	0
20	(Scotland)	DF	Keith Watson	7	0	0	0	0	0	0	0	7	0
21	(Scotland)	FW	Jaison McGrath	0	0	0	0	0	0	0	0	0	0
22	(Scotland)	FW	Calum Gallagher	2	0	0	0	0	0	0	0	2	0
24	(Scotland)	FW	David Clarkson	0	0	0	0	0	0	0	0	0	0
25	(Scotland)	FW	Lawrence Shankland	5	0	0	0	0	0	0	0	5	0
27	(Scotland)	MF	Rocco Quinn	0	0	0	0	0	0	0	0	0	0
28	(Scotland)	DF	Gary Irvine	1	0	0	0	0	0	0	0	1	0
29	(Scotland)	MF	Alex Cooper	1	0	0	0	0	0	0	0	1	0
33	(Scotland)	DF	Jordan Stewart	2	0	1	0	1	0	0	0	4	0
37	(Scotland)	MF	Kyle McAllister	1	0	0	0	0	0	0	0	1	0
Players who left the club during the season:
1	(Scotland)	GK	Mark Ridgers	0	0	0	0	0	0	0	0	0	0
5	(Northern Ireland)	DF	Luke Conlan	0	1	0	0	0	0	0	0	0	1
7	(Scotland)	FW	Paul McMullan	3	0	0	0	0	0	0	0	3	0
26	(Scotland)	DF	Craig Reid	0	1	0	0	0	0	0	0	0	1

== Team statistics ==
=== League table ===
Pos	Team	Pld	W	D	L	GF	GA	GD	Pts	Promotion, qualification or relegation
4	Raith Rovers	36	18	8	10	52	46	+6	62	Qualification for the Premiership play-off quarter-finals
5	Greenock Morton	36	11	10	15	39	42	−3	43	
6	St Mirren	36	11	9	16	44	53	−9	42	
7	Queen of the South	36	12	6	18	46	56	−10	42	
8	Dumbarton	36	10	7	19	35	66	−31	37	

Source: Soccerway
Rules for classification: 1) Points; 2) Goal difference; 3) Number of goals scored

=== Division summary ===
Round	1	2	3	4	5	6	7	8	9	10	11	12	13	14	15	16	17	18	19	20	21	22	23	24	25	26	27	28	29	30	31	32	33	34	35	36
Ground	A	H	A	H	A	H	H	A	H	A	H	A	H	H	A	A	A	H	A	A	H	H	A	H	A	H	A	H	A	H	A	H	A	H	A	H
Result	L	L	D	D	W	L	L	D	D	W	L	L	L	D	D	L	W	L	W	L	W	W	L	W	L	D	L	W	W	L	W	D	L	W	L	D
Position	9	8	8	8	8	8	8	8	8	6	7	8	8	7	7	8	8	9	7	8	8	7	7	7	7	7	7	7	7	7	7	7	7	6	7	6

Updated to match(es) played on 2 May 2016. Source:
A = Away; H = Home; W = Win; D = Draw; L = Loss

=== Management statistics ===
Last updated on 2 May 2016

Name	From	To	P	W	D	L	Win% (Note: Win% is the percentage of matches won rounded to two decimal places.)
Ian Murray	25 July 2015	12 December 2015	21	5	6	10	23.81
Alex Rae	19 December 2015	Present	21	9	3	9	42.86

== Transfers ==
=== In ===
Date	Player	From	Fee	Source
25 June 2015	(Scotland) Scott Agnew	(Scotland) Dumbarton	Free transfer	
29 June 2015	(Scotland) Stuart Carswell	(Scotland) Motherwell	Free transfer	
3 July 2015	(Scotland) Paul McMullan	(Scotland) Celtic	Loan	
23 July 2015	(Northern Ireland) Luke Conlan	(England) Burnley	Loan	
24 July 2015	(New Zealand) Cameron Howieson	(England) Burnley	Free transfer	
4 August 2015	(Scotland) Calum Gallagher	(Scotland) Rangers	Free transfer	
13 August 2015	(Scotland) Jamie Langfield	(Scotland) Aberdeen	Free transfer	
20 August 2015	(Scotland) Keith Watson	Unattached	Free transfer	
26 August 2015	(Scotland) Lawrence Shankland	(Scotland) Aberdeen	Loan	
28 August 2015	(Scotland) Andy Webster	Unattached	Free transfer	
2 September 2015	(Scotland) Jaison McGrath	(Scotland) Celtic	Free transfer	
30 October 2015	(Scotland) Craig Reid	(Scotland) Motherwell	Loan	
15 January 2016	(Scotland) Rocco Quinn	(Scotland) Ross County	Free Transfer	
27 January 2016	(Scotland) David Clarkson	(Scotland) Motherwell	Loan	
29 January 2016	(Scotland) Gary Irvine	(Scotland) Dundee	Free Transfer	
29 January 2016	(Scotland) Alex Cooper	(Scotland) Falkirk	Free Transfer	

=== Out ===
Date	Player	To	Fee	Source
29 May 2015	(Martinique) Yoann Arquin	Unattached	Free transfer	
29 May 2015	(Slovakia) Marián Kello	Unattached	Free transfer	
29 May 2015	(Netherlands) Jeroen Tesselaar	Unattached	Free transfer	
29 May 2015	(Scotland) Mark Williams	Unattached	Free transfer	
29 May 2015	(Scotland) Mo Yaqub	Unattached	Free transfer	
29 May 2015	(England) James Dayton	(England) Oldham Athletic	Loan expiry	
29 May 2015	(England) Emmanuel Sonupe	(England) Tottenham Hotspur	Loan expiry	
1 June 2015	(Scotland) Gary Teale	Unattached	Free transfer	
8 June 2015	(Scotland) Gregg Wylde	Unattached	Free transfer	
8 June 2015	(Bulgaria) Viktor Genev	Unattached	Free transfer	
8 June 2015	(Scotland) Adam Brown	Unattached	Free transfer	
1 July 2015	(Republic of Ireland) Kieran Sadlier	(England) Peterborough United	Free transfer	
20 July 2015	(Scotland) Thomas Reilly	Unattached	Free transfer	
31 July 2015	(Scotland) John McGinn	(Scotland) Hibernian	Undisclosed	
22 September 2015	(Scotland) Mark Ridgers	(Scotland) Kilmarnock	Loan	
2 January 2016	(Northern Ireland) Luke Conlan	(England) Burnley	Loan expiry	
2 January 2016	(Scotland) Craig Reid	(Scotland) Motherwell	Loan expiry	
14 January 2016	(Scotland) Mark Ridgers	Unattached	Free transfer	
29 January 2016	(Scotland) Lewis McLear	(Scotland) Stirling Albion	Loan	
1 February 2016	(Scotland) Paul McMullan	(Scotland) Celtic	Loan expiry	

== See also ==
- List of St Mirren F.C. seasons
