= Jaison McGrath =

Scottish footballer (born 1996)

Personal information
- Date of birth: 8 February 1996 (age 30)
- Position: Forward

Youth career
- Celtic
- Sunderland
- Bathgate Rose

Senior career*
Years	Team	Apps	(Gls)
2013–2015	Hamilton Academical	4	(0)
2015	Celtic	0	(0)
2015–2016	St Mirren	2	(0)

International career
2011	Scotland U15	2	(2)
2011	Scotland U16	5	(1)
2011	Scotland U17	2	(0)
- * Club domestic league appearances and goals as of 13 September 2015 (UTC)

Jaison McGrath (born 8 February 1996) is a Scottish professional footballer who plays as a forward.

== Career ==
=== Club career ===
McGrath moved from Celtic to Sunderland in August 2012. He signed for Hamilton Academical on 14 August 2013, having previously played for Bathgate Rose. He made his senior debut for Hamilton Academical three days later, on 17 August 2013, appearing as a substitute in a 4–1 home victory in the Scottish Championship.

On 27 January 2015, McGrath was released by Hamilton. After leaving Hamilton he returned to Celtic, playing in the club's Development League side.

On 2 September 2015, St Mirren announced that they had signed McGrath on a contract until the end of the 2015–16 season. McGrath made his debut for Saints in a 2–0 victory against Queen of the South just days after signing, when he appeared as a second-half substitute. He was released by St Mirren at the end of the 2015–16 season.

=== International career ===
McGrath represented Scotland at under-15, under-16 and under-17 youth international levels.

== Career statistics ==
As of 13 September 2015

Club	Season	League		FA Cup		League Cup		Other		Total	
Club	Season	Apps	Goals	Apps	Goals	Apps	Goals	Apps	Goals	Apps	Goals
Hamilton Academical	2013–14	4	0	1	0	0	0	0	0	5	0
Hamilton Academical	2014–15	0	0	0	0	0	0	0	0	0	0
Hamilton Academical	Total	4	0	1	0	0	0	0	0	5	0
Celtic	2014–15	0	0	0	0	0	0	0	0	0	0
St Mirren	2015–16	2	0	0	0	0	0	0	0	2	0
Career total		6	0	1	0	0	0	0	0	7	0
