= Lewis McLear =

Scottish footballer

Personal information
- Date of birth: 26 May 1996 (age 30)
- Place of birth: Bellshill, Scotland
- Position: Midfielder

Youth career
- St Mirren

Senior career*
Years	Team	Apps	(Gls)
2014–2017	St Mirren	17	(0)
2016	→ Stirling Albion (loan)	12	(2)
2018	Elgin City (trialist)	1	(0)
2018	Edinburgh City	6	(0)
2018–2019	Albion Rovers	14	(4)
2019	Stirling Albion	10	(0)
2019–2021	Annan Athletic	19	(1)
2021–2023	Caledonian Braves		
- * Club domestic league appearances and goals as of 14:30, 6 October 2021 (UTC)

Lewis McLear (born 26 May 1996) is a Scottish professional footballer who plays as a midfielder.

He has previously played for St Mirren, Elgin City, Edinburgh City, Albion Rovers, Stirling Albion, and Annan Athletic.

== Career ==
McLear made his senior debut on 20 December 2014 in the Scottish Premiership.

On 31 March 2015, McLear signed a three-year contract extension with St Mirren. The deal means that he will be contracted to the club until the summer of 2018.

In January 2016, McLear joined Scottish League Two side Stirling Albion on loan until the end of the season.

McLear left St Mirren in June 2017, after failing to break into the first team. After a trial spell with Elgin City, McLear signed for Edinburgh City in March 2018. He left the club at the end of the 2017–18 season.

On 2 June 2018, McLear signed for Albion Rovers. He then signed for Stirling Albion in January 2019.

On 13 June 2019, McLear signed for Annan Athletic. He left the club at the end of the 2022–23 season when his contract expired.

McLear joined Caledonian Braves in 2021 after leaving Annan.

== Career statistics ==
As of 13 August 2019

Appearances and goals by club, season and competition
Club	Season	League			National Cup		League Cup		Other		Total	
Club	Season	Division	Apps	Goals	Apps	Goals	Apps	Goals	Apps	Goals	Apps	Goals
St Mirren	2014–15	Scottish Premiership	11	0	0	0	0	0	0	0	11	0
St Mirren	2015–16	Scottish Championship	3	0	0	0	0	0	4 (Note: Appearances in the Scottish Challenge Cup)	0	7	0
St Mirren	2016–17	Scottish Championship	3	0	0	0	0	0	0	0	3	0
St Mirren	Total		17	0	0	0	0	0	4	0	21	0
Stirling Albion (loan)	2015–16	Scottish League Two	12	2	0	0	0	0	0	0	12	2
Elgin City	2017–18	Scottish League Two	1	0	0	0	0	0	0	0	1	0
Edinburgh City	2017–18	Scottish League Two	6	0	0	0	0	0	0	0	6	0
Albion Rovers	2018–19	Scottish League Two	14	4	1	0	1	0	4	0	20	4
Stirling Albion	2018–19	Scottish League Two	10	0	0	0	0	0	0	0	10	0
Annan Athletic	2019–20	Scottish League Two	2	0	0	0	3	1	1	0	6	1
Career total			62	6	1	0	4	1	9	0	76	7
