= Tim Dreesen =

Belgian footballer (born 1987)

Personal information
- Full name: Timothy Dreesen
- Date of birth: 30 January 1987 (age 39)
- Place of birth: Geel, Belgium
- Height: 1.90 m (6 ft 3 in)
- Position: Centre back

Team information
- Current team: KSAV St. Dimpna

Youth career
- 1996–2000: Alberta
- 2000–2004: Lierse

Senior career*
| Years | Team | Apps | (Gls) |
| 2004–2006 | Lierse | 21 | (0) |
| 2006–2009 | Club Brugge | 2 | (0) |
| 2007–2008 | → Sint-Truiden (loan) | 21 | (1) |
| 2008–2009 | → Lierse (loan) | 30 | (0) |
| 2009–2011 | Lierse | 19 | (0) |
| 2011 | → Turnhout (loan) | 12 | (0) |
| 2011–2014 | Fortuna Sittard | 76 | (1) |
| 2014 | Ross County | 3 | (0) |
| 2015–2017 | Dessel Sport | 48 | (8) |
| 2017–2020 | KSC City Pirates | | |
| 2020– | KSAV St. Dimpna | | |

International career
| 2002 | Belgium U16 | 2 | (0) |
| 2003–2004 | Belgium U17 | 7 | (0) |
| 2004–2005 | Belgium U18 | 4 | (0) |
| 2005–2006 | Belgium U19 | 10 | (0) |
| 2008 | Belgium U20 | 1 | (0) |
- * Club domestic league appearances and goals as of 19:43, 4 February 2021 (UTC)

Timothy Dreesen (born 30 January 1987 in Geel) is a Belgian professional footballer who plays as a centre back for KSAV St. Dimpna.

Dreesen signed for Scottish club Ross County in July 2014. He was released from his contract in November 2014.
