= 2014–15 St Mirren F.C. season =

St Mirren
2014–15 season
- Chairman: Stewart Gilmour
- Manager: Tommy Craig (until 9 December); Gary Teale (until 22 May); Ian Murray
- Stadium: St Mirren Park
- Premiership: 12th (relegated)
- League Cup: Third Round lost to Partick Thistle
- Scottish Cup: Fourth Round lost to Inverness Caledonian Thistle
- Top goalscorer: League: Kenny McLean (7); All: Kenny McLean (7)
- Highest home attendance: 5,784 vs Celtic (3 April 2015)
- Lowest home attendance: 2,511 vs Dundee Utd (21 January 2015)
- Average home league attendance: 3,878
Home colours	Away colours

The 2014–15 season is the club's second season in the Scottish Premiership and their ninth consecutive appearance in the top flight of Scottish football. St Mirren will also compete in the League Cup and the Scottish Cup.

== Month by month review ==
=== May ===
On 12 May it was announced that Danny Lennon would not be offered a new contract by the club, bringing an end to his four-year reign as St Mirren manager.

On 13 May the club confirmed former first team coach Tommy Craig as new St Mirren manager. Club captain, Jim Goodwin, and Gary Teale were also appointed as player-coaches to assist Craig.

On 18 May the SPFL awarded Saints midfielder Kenny McLean with the Player of the Month award for April 2014. This was the first time a St Mirren player had received the award from the new governing body.

On 19 May it was announced that defender David van Zanten would not be offered a new contract, and will be leaving the club after making over 332 appearances and scoring 8 goals.

On 20 May it was confirmed that Steven Thompson has been appointed as the new St Mirren club captain for the upcoming season.

Also on this day it was confirmed that Eric Djemba-Djemba, Conor Newton, Josh Magennis and Adam Campbell had left the club.

On 27 May it was announced that midfielder Paul McGowan would not be offered a new contract, and had been released by the club.

Also on this day it was confirmed that Slovak goalkeeper Marián Kello, and defender Mo Yaqub had signed new one-year deals with the club.

=== June ===
On 6 June the club announced Scottish goalkeeper Mark Ridgers as Tommy Craig's first signing for the club.

On 11 June defender Darren McGregor left the club on a free transfer, signing for Scottish Championship side Rangers.

On 12 June Tommy Craig confirmed that French goalkeeper, Christopher Dilo, had been released after he failed to respond to the offer of a new contract.

On 26 June it was announced that Saints had made their second signing on the summer, with English forward James Marwood joining on a one-year deal from Conference National side Gateshead.

On 27 June the club announced that midfielder, Gary Harkins, has had his contract with the club cancelled by mutual consent. After signing in the summer of 2013, Harkins had an unsuccessful time at the club and was loaned out to Oldham Athletic in January 2014.

=== July ===
On 2 July it was announced that midfielder Kenny McLean had signed a two-year contract extension with the club, tying him to the club until the summer of 2016.

Also on this day, the club confirmed that Manchester City defender Ellis Plummer had signed on a one-year loan deal.

On 14 July it was announced that 20-year-old striker Ross Caldwell had signed a one-year deal with the club, with the option of a further year. The former Hibernian player was released in the summer following their relegation from the Scottish Premiership, and signed for Saints after a successful trial.

On 19 July Saints won the Renfrewshire Cup when they defeated local rivals Greenock Morton 1–0 at Cappielow. This was the 55th time that Saints have lifted the trophy, and the eighth time they have defeated Greenock Morton in the last nine finals.

On 25 July, defender Jeroen Tesselaar returned to Saints on a one-year deal. The Dutch player left the club in 2012, but has returned after leaving Kilmarnock on a free transfer in the summer.

On 30 July Saints signed striker Callum Ball on a one-year deal, with the option of a further year. The Englishman impressed the club by scoring 5 goals in two pre-season friendly matches, while playing as a trialist.

=== August ===
On 6 August, Saints were drawn at home to Scottish League One side Dunfermline Athletic, for the 2nd Round of the Scottish League Cup. The tie will take place on 26 or 27 August.

On 19 August it was announced that midfielder Adam Drury had signed a season long loan deal with Saints, moving from Manchester City.

On 21 August it was announced that defensive midfielder Isaac Osbourne had signed a one-year deal with the club. Isaac has previously played in Scotland with Aberdeen, and most recently Partick Thistle

On 27 August, Saints were drawn away to Partick Thistle in the 3rd Round of the Scottish League Cup.

=== September ===
On 17 September, it was confirmed that striker Steven Thompson would undergo surgery for a groin injury. Thompson has been a vital part of the Saints squad since joining the club three years ago, and this is a massive blow for the season ahead. Thompson is expected to be out of action for around three months.

=== November ===
On 3 November Saints were handed a home tie against Inverness Caledonian Thistle in the 4th Round of the 2014–15 Scottish Cup, with the tie being played on 29 November 2014.

On 5 November Saints player-coach, Jim Goodwin, accepted a three–match ban following a charge of violent conduct. The club's board expressed their disappointment in the players conduct, following an elbowing incident on Aidan Connolly in the recent defeat at Dundee United.

On 18 November defender Jason Naismith earned his first Scotland Under–21 cap against Switzerland in a friendly match. The 20-year old came on as a 72nd-minute substitute, replacing Marcus Fraser. The match ended in a 1–1 draw.

=== December ===
On 9 December it was announced that manager Tommy Craig had left the club by mutual consent. It was not a surprise announcement, following recent pressure from the club's fans – due to the poor record of Craig since taking charge of the team. It was confirmed that Gary Teale will take interim charge of the first team until a new manager is appointed, with Head of Youth Development David Longwell assisting.

=== January ===
On 2 January the club confirmed that Ellis Plummer and youngster Declan Hughes had left the club. Plummer made 7 appearances for the club, but due to injuries his one-year loan period was cut short. Youth player Declan Hughes was freed without having played a match for the club.

On 5 January the club announced that Adam Drury had left the club, cutting short his one-year loan period from Manchester City.

On the same day the club also announced that it had rejected a bid from Fleetwood Town for young midfielder, Kenny McLean. The bid of approximately £150,000 was deemed to low, with the club stating "the offer does not come close to the club's valuation of the player".

On 9 January summer signing Ross Caldwell left the club by mutual consent, after failing to make an impact. In total he made 15 appearances, and scored 2 goals.

Also on this day, Stevie Mallan won the SPFL Young Player of the Month award for December 2014, following his impressive start to his senior Saints career.

On 14 January striker Yoann Arquin signed for the club until the end of season 2014–15.

On 20 January summer signing James Marwood left the club by mutual consent, having failed to make an impact on the first team.

On 24 January it was announced that teenager Stevie Mallan had signed a three-year contract extension, tying him to the club until the summer of 2018.

On 29 January the club confirmed Gary Teale as club manager, after almost two months serving as caretaker manager. Teale will take charge until the end of the season.

Also on this day, midfielder James Dayton joined the club on loan from Oldham Athletic until the end of the season.

=== February ===
On 2 February midfielder Kenny McLean was transferred to Aberdeen for a reported fee of £300,000.

Also on this day Saints signed 18-year-old attacking midfielder Emmanuel Sonupe on-loan from Tottenham Hotspur until the end of the season.

On 4 February it was announced that Republic of Ireland Under-21 attacking midfielder, Kieran Sadlier, had signed for Saints until the end of the season, after being released by West Ham United.

On 19 February manager Gary Teale was given a two-match touchline ban by the SFA for comments he previously made about referee Steven McLean.

On 20 February Saints signed Alan Gow until the end of season.

On 26 February Saints signed Bulgarian defender Viktor Genev until the end of season.

=== March ===
On 31 March Lewis McLear signed a three–year contract extension. The deal means that he will be contracted to the club until the summer of 2018.

=== April ===
On 15 April defender Marc McAusland left the club by mutual consent. The Saints fan made 187 appearances for the club, scoring 6 goals.

On 21 April two more players cancelled their contracts with the club by mutual consent, before the close of the season. Forward Callum Ball leaves the club after making 24 appearances in total, scoring twice. Midfielder Isaac Osbourne also left the club, making 18 appearances without scoring.

On 27 April it was reported that club captain Steven Thompson "speared" teammate John McGinn in a bizarre training ground prank gone wrong. The incident happened before the recent 2015–16 Scottish Championship victory at home to Kilmarnock, and will see McGinn sidelined for around three weeks.

=== May ===
On 4 May Stevie Mallan was awarded with the PFA Scotland 'Goal of the Season' award, for his strike against Dundee on 27 December 2014.

On 8 May Saints were relegated to the Scottish Championship. This was confirmed following Motherwell's 3–1 win over Kilmarnock, leaving Saints unable escape relegation with three league games remaining.

On 11 May the St Mirren board released a statement, advising that they are inviting applications for the managers job. This is despite Gary Teale still being the current club manager.

On 14 May the club announced that youngsters Jack Baird, Lewis Morgan and Barry Cuddihy had all signed contract extensions to their current deals. Baird and Morgan have signed two–year extensions, while Cuddihy signed a one–year extension with the option of another year after that.

On 16 May chairman Stewart Gilmour confirmed that the permanent St Mirren manager role will be resolved in 'the next 10 days'.

On 22 May the club announced that Dumbarton manager, Ian Murray, had been appointed as Saints new manager. Despite being officially announced today, current manager Gary Teale will remain in charge for the last league game of the season away to Hamilton Academical.

== Results and fixtures ==
Win Draw Loss Postponed

=== Pre season / Friendlies ===
15 July 2014 Friendly	Albion Rovers	0–1	St Mirren	Cliftonhill
19:45		Report	Caldwell 25'	Referee: Andrew Dallas

17 July 2014 Renfrewshire Cup Semi-final	St Mirren XI	10–0	Port Glasgow Old Boys Union	Ralston Training Complex
19:00	Kieran Doran; Mark Williams; Lewis Morgan; Declan Hughes; Conor Murray; Adam Brown; Reilly; Stephen Mallan	Report

19 July 2014 Renfrewshire Cup Final	Greenock Morton	0–1	St Mirren	Cappielow
15:00		Report	Naismith 76'	Attendance: 2,811; Referee: Greg Aitken

22 July 2014 Friendly	Cowdenbeath	1–4	St Mirren	Central Park
19:45	A Trialist 6'	Report	Naismith 28'; McLean 45'; Darren Brownlie 64' (o.g.); Marwood 78'	Referee: Brian Colvin

26 July 2014 Friendly	Blyth Spartans	2–4	St Mirren	Croft Park
15:00	Neal Hooks 50'; Paul Robinson 75' (pen.)	Report	A Trialist 6'; Marwood 42'; Caldwell 90+2'; Mark Williams 90+4'	Attendance: 447; Referee: Lucy May

28 July 2014 Friendly	Whitley Bay	0–10	St Mirren	Hillheads Park
19:30		Report	Reilly 25'; A Trialist 26', 54', 74', 84'; McLean 28' (pen.), 90'; Caldwell 46', 89'; Wylde 58'	Attendance: 533; Referee: Michael Oliver

1 August 2014 Friendly	Carlisle United	2–1	St Mirren	Brunton Park
19:30	Grainger 24'; Kearns 75'	Report	Reilly 77'	Attendance: 1,559; Referee: Jeremy Simpson

10 February 2015 Friendly	New York City FC	2–0	St Mirren	Etihad Campus, Manchester
19:00	Villa 34'; Taylor 70'	Report		Referee: Mark Heywood

=== Scottish Premiership ===
9 August 2014 1	Motherwell	1–0	St Mirren	Fir Park
15:00	Erwin 64'	BBC Report		Attendance: 4,602; Referee: Calum Murray

13 August 2014 2	St Mirren	0–2	Hamilton Academical	St Mirren Park
19:45		BBC Report	Crawford 19'; McAusland 51' (o.g.)	Attendance: 3,635; Referee: Alan Muir

16 August 2014	Aberdeen	P – P	St Mirren	Pittodrie Stadium
15:00		Report

23 August 2014 3	St Mirren	0–1	Dundee	St Mirren Park
15:00		BBC Report	MacDonald 80'	Attendance: 4,517; Referee: John Beaton

30 August 2014 4	St Mirren	0–3	Dundee United	St Mirren Park
15:00		BBC Report	Erskine 47'; Fojut 69'; Spittal 86'	Attendance: 4,425; Referee: Bobby Madden

13 September 2014 5	Kilmarnock	2–1	St Mirren	Rugby Park
15:00	Muirhead 63'; Connolly 82'	BBC Report	Drury 71'	Attendance: 4,417; Referee: Alan Muir

19 September 2014 6	Partick Thistle	1–2	St Mirren	Firhill Stadium
19:45	Doolan 22'	BBC Report	Ball 60'; McLean 90' (pen.)	Attendance: 3,821; Referee: Willie Collum

27 September 2014 7	St Mirren	1–2	Celtic	St Mirren Park
12:45	McLean 49'	BBC Report	Guidetti 42', 63'	Attendance: 5,280; Referee: Craig Thomson

30 September 2014 8	Aberdeen	2–2	St Mirren	Pittodrie Stadium
19:45	Reynolds 45'; Pawlett 56'	BBC Report	Ball 57'; McLean 86' (pen.)	Attendance: 10,373; Referee: Crawford Allan

4 October 2014 9	St Johnstone	1–2	St Mirren	McDiarmid Park
15:00	Anderson 68'	BBC Report	Naismith 28'; Drury 87'	Attendance: 3,400; Referee: Don Robertson

18 October 2014 10	St Mirren	0–1	Inverness Caledonian Thistle	St Mirren Park
15:00		BBC Report	Tansey 43' (pen.)	Attendance: 3,109; Referee: Willie Collum

25 October 2014 11	St Mirren	2–2	Ross County	St Mirren Park
15:00	Drury 44'; Tesselaar 60'	BBC Report	Quinn 11'; Carey 58'	Attendance: 3,459; Referee: Don Robertson

1 November 2014 12	Dundee United	3–0	St Mirren	Tannadice Park
15:00	Paton 45'; Çiftçi 56'; Telfer 75'	BBC Report		Attendance: 6,808; Referee: Andrew Dallas

8 November 2014 13	St Mirren	0–1	Partick Thistle	St Mirren Park
15:00		BBC Report	Elliott 75'	Attendance: 4,636; Referee: John Beaton

22 November 2014 14	Hamilton Academical	3–0	St Mirren	New Douglas Park
15:00	Andreu 40'; Antoine-Curier 67'; Crawford 74'	BBC Report		Attendance: 2,195; Referee: Greg Aitken

6 December 2014 15	St Mirren	0–1	St Johnstone	St Mirren Park
15:00		BBC Report	O'Halloran 8'	Attendance: 2,720; Referee: Kevin Clancy

14 December 2014 16	Celtic	4–1	St Mirren	Celtic Park
13:00	Brown 4', 18'; Forrest 15'; Stokes 67'	BBC Report	Kelly 10'	Attendance: 44,827; Referee: Craig Thomson

20 December 2014 17	St Mirren	0–1	Motherwell	St Mirren Park
15:00		BBC Report	Sutton 72'	Attendance: 3,909; Referee: Alan Muir

27 December 2014 18	Dundee	1–3	St Mirren	Dens Park
15:00	Irvine 84'	BBC Report	McLean 28', 79' (pen.); Mallan 68'	Attendance: 6,447; Referee: Don Robertson

1 January 2015 19	St Mirren	1–2	Kilmarnock	St Mirren Park
15:00	Wylde 90' (pen.)	BBC Sport	Eremenko 54' (pen.); Slater 85' (pen.)	Attendance: 3,912; Referee: Willie Collum

4 January 2015 20	Inverness Caledonian Thistle	1–0	St Mirren	Caledonian Stadium
15:00	McKay 77'	BBC Sport		Attendance: 2,751; Referee: Bobby Madden

10 January 2015 21	St Mirren	0–2	Aberdeen	St Mirren Park
15:00		BBC Report	McGinn 31'; Logan 33'	Attendance: 4,977; Referee: Steven McLean

17 January 2015 22	Ross County	1–2	St Mirren	Victoria Park
15:00	Boyce 82'	BBC Report	Kelly 16'; Mallan 87'	Attendance: 3,005; Referee: Brian Colvin

21 January 2015 23	St Mirren	1–1	Dundee United	St Mirren Park
19:45	McLean 39'	BBC Report	Armstrong 43'	Attendance: 2,511; Referee: John Beaton

24 January 2015 24	St Mirren	1–2	Dundee	St Mirren Park
15:00	McLean 40'	BBC Report	Irvine 53'; Davidson 69'	Attendance: 4,010; Referee: Steven McLean

30 January 2015 25	Partick Thistle	0–1	St Mirren	Firhill Stadium
19:45		BBC Report	Dayton 6'	Attendance: 3,864; Referee: Kevin Clancy

14 February 2015 26	St Mirren	1–2	Inverness Caledonian Thistle	St Mirren Park
15:00	Goodwin 68'	BBC Report	Tansey 3'; Christie 60'	Attendance: 3,154; Referee: Bobby Madden

21 February 2015 27	Aberdeen	3–0	St Mirren	Pittodrie Stadium
15:00	Rooney 21', 48'; Reynolds 66'	BBC Report		Attendance: 14,720; Referee: Kevin Clancy

28 February 2015 28	St Mirren	1–0	Hamilton Academical	St Mirren Park
15:00	Thompson 63'	BBC Report		Attendance: 3,503; Referee: Crawford Allan

14 March 2015 29	Kilmarnock	1–0	St Mirren	Rugby Park
15:00	Miller 87'	BBC Report		Attendance: 4,721; Referee: Steven McLean

21 March 2015 30	St Johnstone	2–0	St Mirren	McDiarmid Park
15:00	Graham 33'; Anderson 62'	BBC Report		Attendance: 3,166; Referee: John Beaton

3 April 2015 31	St Mirren	0–2	Celtic	St Mirren Park
19:45		BBC Report	Forrest 64'; Johansen 79' (pen.)	Attendance: 5,784; Referee: Alan Muir

7 April 2015 32	Motherwell	5–0	St Mirren	Fir Park
19:45	Erwin 7', 25'; McDonald 45'; Sutton 74', 79'	BBC Report		Attendance: 4,596; Referee: Craig Thomson

13 April 2015 33	St Mirren	0–3	Ross County	St Mirren Park
19:45		BBC Report	Boyce 30', 75', 90'	Attendance: 3,033; Referee: Willie Collum

25 April 2015 34	St Mirren	4–1	Kilmarnock	St Mirren Park
15:00	Kelly 8'; Sadlier 33'; Thompson 57' (pen.), 65' (pen.)	BBC Report	Magennis 53'	Attendance: 3,205; Referee: Kevin Clancy

2 May 2015 35	Partick Thistle	3–0	St Mirren	Firhill Stadium
15:00	Stevenson 68'; Doolan 82'; Lawless 90'	BBC Report		Attendance: 3,865; Referee: Craig Thomson

9 May 2015 36	Ross County	1–2	St Mirren	Victoria Park
15:00	Woods 31' (pen.)	BBC Report	Mallan 39'; Thompson 90' (pen.)	Attendance: 3,098; Referee: Steven McLean

16 May 2015 37	St Mirren	2–1	Motherwell	St Mirren Park
15:00	Naismith 84'; Mallan 90'	BBC Report	Sutton 75' (pen.)	Attendance: 3,912; Referee: Brian Colvin

23 May 2015 38	Hamilton Academical	1–0	St Mirren	New Douglas Park
15:00	Crawford 83'	BBC Report		Attendance: 2,425; Referee: Craig Thomson

=== Scottish League Cup ===
26 August 2014 Round 2	St Mirren	2–1	Dunfermline Athletic	St Mirren Park
19:45	Caldwell 50', 80'	BBC Report	Spence 9'	Attendance: 1,931; Referee: Steven McLean

23 September 2014 Round 3	Partick Thistle	1–0	St Mirren	Firhill Stadium
19:45	Eccleston 100'	BBC Report		Attendance: 1,879; Referee: Calum Murray

=== Scottish Cup ===
29 November 2014 Round 4	St Mirren	1–1	Inverness Caledonian Thistle	St Mirren Park
15:00	McAusland 17'	BBC Report	Meekings 63'	Attendance: 1,957; Referee: Calum Murray

2 December 2014 Round 4 replay	Inverness Caledonian Thistle	4–0	St Mirren	Caledonian Stadium
19:45	Warren 20'; Tansey 23' (pen.); Williams 67'; Shinnie 90'	BBC Report		Attendance: 1,326; Referee: Calum Murray

== Player statistics ==
=== Captains ===
No.	P	Name	Country	No. games	Notes
4	DF	Marc McAusland	(Scotland)	22	
9	FW	Steven Thompson	(Scotland)	18	Club captain
6	MF	Jim Goodwin	(Republic of Ireland)	1	
8	MF	Kenny McLean	(Scotland)	1	

Last updated: 23 May 2015
Source: Competitive match reports.
Competitive matches only
Matches started as captain only
Country: FIFA nationality; No.: Squad number; P: Position; Name: Player name; No. Games: Number of games started as captain.

=== Squad information ===
Last updated 23 May 2015

No.	Pos	Nat	Player	Total		Premiership		League Cup		Scottish Cup	
No.	Pos	Nat	Player	Apps	Goals	Apps	Goals	Apps	Goals	Apps	Goals
2	DF	(Scotland) SCO	Jason Naismith	41	2	38+0	2	1+0	0	2+0	0
3	DF	(Scotland) SCO	Sean Kelly	34	3	28+3	3	0+1	0	2+0	0
6	MF	(Republic of Ireland) IRL	Jim Goodwin	30	1	28+0	1	1+0	0	1+0	0
7	MF	(Scotland) SCO	John McGinn	33	0	30+0	0	1+0	0	2+0	0
8	MF	(Scotland) SCO	Alan Gow	8	0	5+3	0	0+0	0	0+0	0
9	FW	(Scotland) SCO	Steven Thompson	21	4	15+3	4	1+0	0	2+0	0
10	MF	(Republic of Ireland) IRL	Kieran Sadlier	11	1	5+6	1	0+0	0	0+0	0
11	MF	(Scotland) SCO	Gregg Wylde	29	1	11+16	1	2+0	0	0+0	0
12	GK	(Scotland) SCO	Mark Ridgers	25	0	23+0	0	0+0	0	2+0	0
14	FW	(Scotland) SCO	Thomas Reilly	24	0	14+7	0	0+1	0	2+0	0
15	FW	(Martinique) MTQ	Yoann Arquin	12	0	8+4	0	0+0	0	0+0	0
17	MF	(England) ENG	James Dayton	13	1	13+0	1	0+0	0	0+0	0
18	MF	(Scotland) SCO	Mo Yaqub	0	0	0+0	0	0+0	0	0+0	0
19	MF	(Scotland) SCO	Adam Brown	8	0	1+6	0	0+0	0	0+1	0
20	MF	(Scotland) SCO	Mark Williams	0	0	0+0	0	0+0	0	0+0	0
21	MF	(Scotland) SCO	Gary Teale	7	0	3+2	0	1+0	0	0+1	0
22	DF	(Netherlands) NED	Jeroen Tesselaar	36	1	32+0	1	2+0	0	2+0	0
25	MF	(England) ENG	Emmanuel Sonupe	4	0	0+4	0	0+0	0	0+0	0
28	GK	(Slovakia) SVK	Marián Kello	17	0	15+0	0	2+0	0	0+0	0
30	DF	(Scotland) SCO	Jack Baird	8	0	7+1	0	0+0	0	0+0	0
31	MF	(Scotland) SCO	Stevie Mallan	25	4	24+1	4	0+0	0	0+0	0
32	MF	(Scotland) SCO	Lewis McLear	11	0	6+5	0	0+0	0	0+0	0
34	MF	(Scotland) SCO	Lewis Morgan	8	0	1+7	0	0+0	0	0+0	0
36	MF	(Scotland) SCO	Barry Cuddihy	3	0	0+3	0	0+0	0	0+0	0
45	MF	(Scotland) SCO	Jordan Stewart	1	0	0+1	0	0+0	0	0+0	0
52	DF	(Bulgaria) BUL	Viktor Genev	6	0	6+0	0	0+0	0	0+0	0
Players who left club during the season:
4	DF	(Scotland) SCO	Marc McAusland	33	1	28+1	0	2+0	0	2+0	1
5	DF	(England) ENG	Ellis Plummer	7	0	6+0	0	1+0	0	0+0	0
8	MF	(Scotland) SCO	Kenny McLean	29	7	25+0	7	2+0	0	2+0	0
10	FW	(England) ENG	James Marwood	15	0	10+3	0	1+0	0	1+0	0
13	MF	(England) ENG	Isaac Osbourne	18	0	13+1	0	2+0	0	2+0	0
16	FW	(England) ENG	Callum Ball	24	2	11+9	2	1+1	0	0+2	0
17	MF	(England) ENG	Adam Drury	16	3	10+2	3	2+0	0	0+2	0
23	MF	(Scotland) SCO	Declan Hughes	0	0	0+0	0	0+0	0	0+0	0
29	ST	(Scotland) SCO	Ross Caldwell	15	2	2+11	0	0+2	2	0+0	0

=== Disciplinary record ===
Includes all competitive matches.

Last updated 23 May 2015

Number	Nation	Position	Name	Premiership		League Cup		Scottish Cup		Total	
Number	Nation	Position	Name	Booked	Sent off (straight red)	Booked	Sent off (straight red)	Booked	Sent off (straight red)	Booked	Sent off (straight red)
2	(Scotland)	DF	Jason Naismith	5	0	0	0	0	0	5	0
3	(Scotland)	MF	Sean Kelly	1	0	0	0	0	0	1	0
6	(Republic of Ireland)	MF	Jim Goodwin	8	1	0	0	1	0	9	1
7	(Scotland)	MF	John McGinn	5	0	0	0	0	0	5	0
8	(Scotland)	MF	Alan Gow	0	0	0	0	0	0	0	0
9	(Scotland)	FW	Steven Thompson	0	1	0	0	0	0	0	1
10	(Republic of Ireland)	MF	Kieran Sadlier	0	0	0	0	0	0	0	0
11	(Scotland)	MF	Gregg Wylde	0	0	0	0	0	0	0	0
12	(Scotland)	GK	Mark Ridgers	0	0	0	0	0	0	0	0
14	(Scotland)	FW	Thomas Reilly	4	0	0	0	0	0	4	0
15	(Martinique)	FW	Yoann Arquin	1	1	0	0	0	0	1	1
17	(England)	MF	James Dayton	1	0	0	0	0	0	1	0
18	(Scotland)	MF	Mo Yaqub	0	0	0	0	0	0	0	0
19	(Scotland)	MF	Adam Brown	0	0	0	0	0	0	0	0
20	(Scotland)	DF	Mark Williams	0	0	0	0	0	0	0	0
21	(Scotland)	MF	Gary Teale	1	0	0	0	0	0	1	0
22	(Netherlands)	DF	Jeroen Tesselaar	5	0	1	0	0	0	6	0
25	(England)	MF	Emmanuel Sonupe	0	0	0	0	0	0	0	0
28	(Slovakia)	GK	Marián Kello	0	0	0	0	0	0	0	0
30	(Scotland)	DF	Jack Baird	1	0	0	0	0	0	1	0
31	(Scotland)	MF	Stevie Mallan	5	0	0	0	0	0	5	0
32	(Scotland)	MF	Lewis McLear	0	0	0	0	0	0	0	0
34	(Scotland)	MF	Lewis Morgan	0	0	0	0	0	0	0	0
36	(Scotland)	MF	Barry Cuddihy	0	0	0	0	0	0	0	0
45	(Scotland)	MF	Jordan Stewart	0	0	0	0	0	0	0	0
52	(Bulgaria)	DF	Viktor Genev	2	1	0	0	0	0	2	1
Players who left club during the season:
4	(Scotland)	DF	Marc McAusland	9	0	1	0	0	0	10	0
5	(England)	DF	Ellis Plummer	2	0	0	0	0	0	2	0
8	(Scotland)	MF	Kenny McLean	4	0	0	0	0	0	4	0
10	(England)	FW	James Marwood	2	0	0	0	0	0	2	0
13	(England)	MF	Isaac Osbourne	3	0	0	0	0	0	3	0
16	(England)	FW	Callum Ball	0	0	0	0	0	0	0	0
17	(England)	MF	Adam Drury	0	0	1	0	0	0	1	0
23	(Scotland)	MF	Declan Hughes	0	0	0	0	0	0	0	0
29	(Scotland)	ST	Ross Caldwell	1	0	0	0	0	0	1	0

== Team statistics ==
=== League table ===
Pos	Team	Pld	W	D	L	GF	GA	GD	Pts	Qualification or relegation
8	Partick Thistle	38	12	10	16	48	44	+4	46	
9	Ross County	38	12	8	18	46	63	−17	44	
10	Kilmarnock	38	11	8	19	44	59	−15	41	
11	Motherwell (O)	38	10	6	22	38	63	−25	36	Qualification for the Premiership play-off final
12	St Mirren (R)	38	9	3	26	30	66	−36	30	Relegation to the Championship

Source: SPFL
Rules for classification: 1) points; 2) goal difference; 3) number of goals scored
(O) Play-off winners; (R) Relegated

=== Division summary ===
Round	1	2	3	4	5	6	7	8	9	10	11	12	13	14	15	16	17	18	19	20	21	22	23	24	25	26	27	28	29	30	31	32	33	34	35	36	37	38
Ground	A	H	H	H	A	A	H	A	A	H	H	A	H	A	H	A	H	A	H	A	H	A	H	H	A	H	A	H	A	A	H	A	H	H	A	A	H	A
Result	L	L	L	L	L	W	L	D	W	L	D	L	L	L	L	L	L	W	L	L	L	W	D	L	W	L	L	W	L	L	L	L	L	W	L	W	W	L
Position	10	11	11	11	11	11	11	11	10	10	10	10	11	11	11	12	12	11	11	11	12	11	11	11	10	10	11	11	12	12	12	12	12	12	12	12	12	12

Updated to match(es) played on 23 May 2015. Source:
A = Away; H = Home; W = Win; D = Draw; L = Loss

== Transfers ==
=== In ===
Date	Player	From	Fee
6 June 2014	(Scotland) Mark Ridgers	(Scotland) Heart of Midlothian	Free
26 June 2014	(England) James Marwood	(England) Gateshead	Free
2 July 2014	(England) Ellis Plummer	(England) Manchester City	Loan
14 July 2014	(Scotland) Ross Caldwell	(Scotland) Hibernian	Free
25 July 2014	(Netherlands) Jeroen Tesselaar	(Scotland) Kilmarnock	Free
30 July 2014	(England) Callum Ball	(England) Derby County	Free
19 August 2014	(England) Adam Drury	(England) Manchester City	Loan
21 August 2014	(England) Isaac Osbourne	(Scotland) Partick Thistle	Free
14 January 2015	(Martinique) Yoann Arquin	(Scotland) Ross County	Free
29 January 2015	(England) James Dayton	(England) Oldham Athletic	Loan
2 February 2015	(England) Emmanuel Sonupe	(England) Tottenham Hotspur	Loan
4 February 2015	(Republic of Ireland) Kieran Sadlier	(England) West Ham United	Free
20 February 2015	(Scotland) Alan Gow	Free agent	Free
26 February 2015	(Bulgaria) Viktor Genev	(Kazakhstan) Spartak Semey	Free

=== Out ===
Date	Player	To	Fee
19 May 2014	(Republic of Ireland) David van Zanten	(Scotland) Dumbarton	Free
20 May 2014	(Cameroon) Eric Djemba-Djemba	(India) Chennaiyin	Free
27 May 2014	(Scotland) Paul McGowan	(Scotland) Dundee	Free
11 June 2014	(Scotland) Darren McGregor	(Scotland) Rangers	Free
12 June 2014	(France) Christopher Dilo	(France) Stade Rennais	Free
27 June 2014	(Scotland) Gary Harkins	(Scotland) Dundee	Free
2 January 2015	(Scotland) Declan Hughes	Unattached	Free
9 January 2015	(Scotland) Ross Caldwell	(Scotland) Greenock Morton	Free
20 January 2015	(England) James Marwood	(England) Forest Green Rovers	Free
2 February 2015	(Scotland) Kenny McLean	(Scotland) Aberdeen	£300,000
15 April 2015	(Scotland) Marc McAusland	Unattached	Free
21 April 2015	(England) Callum Ball	Unattached	Free
21 April 2015	(England) Isaac Osbourne	Unattached	Free

== See also ==
- List of St Mirren F.C. seasons
