= 2011–12 St Mirren F.C. season =

St Mirren
2011–12 season
- Chairman: Stewart Gilmour
- Manager: Danny Lennon
- Stadium: St Mirren Park
- SPL: 8th
- Scottish Cup: Quarter-Final lost to Hearts
- League Cup: Quarter-Final lost to Ayr United
- Top goalscorer: League: Steven Thompson (13); All: Steven Thompson (16)
- Highest home attendance: 6,711 v Rangers (24 December 2011)
- Lowest home attendance: 3,305 v Hibernian (29 April 2012)
- Average home league attendance: 4,493
Home colours	Away colours

The 2011–12 season was St Mirren's sixth consecutive season in the Scottish Premier League, having competed in the league since their promotion in the 2005–06 season. St Mirren also competed in the League Cup and the Scottish Cup.

== Summary ==
St Mirren finished eight in the Scottish Premier League. They reached the quarter-finals of the Scottish Cup where they were beaten by eventual winners Hearts. They also reached the League Cup quarter-finals but were beaten by lower league opposition Ayr United.

== Matches ==
Win Draw Loss

=== Friendlies ===
5 July 2011 Friendly	Queen's Park	1 – 1	St Mirren	Hampden Park, Glasgow
	Watt		Trialist

9 July 2011 Friendly	Ayr United	1 – 0	St Mirren	Somerset Park, Ayr
	Patterson 80'	Ayr Report		Attendance: 1,004; Referee: Steven McLean

12 July 2011 Friendly	Dumbarton	0 – 2	St Mirren	Strathclyde Homes Stadium
		St Mirren Report	Teale 4'; Thomson 24'	Referee: Gary Hilland

16 July 2011 Renfrewshire Cup Final 2011	St Mirren	4 – 2	Greenock Morton	St Mirren Park
	Thompson; Thomson; McGowan	St Mirren Report	Weatherson	Referee: Steve Conroy

19 July 2011 Friendly	Cowdenbeath	3 – 1	St Mirren	Central Park
	Robertson 18'; Stewart 60', 85'	St Mirren Report	McGowan 27'	Attendance: 221; Referee: Kevin Clancy

=== Scottish Premier League ===
25 July 2011 SPL Round 1	Dunfermline	0 – 0	St Mirren	East End Park
		BBC Sport		Attendance: 5,035; Referee: O'Reilly

30 July 2011 SPL Round 2	St Mirren	1 – 0	Aberdeen	St Mirren Park
	Hasselbaink 50'	BBC Sport		Attendance: 5,011; Referee: Norris

6 August 2011 SPL Round 3	Dundee United	1 – 1	St Mirren	Tannadice Park
	Daly 67'	BBC Sport	Thompson 11'	Attendance: 6,594; Referee: Allan

13 August 2011 SPL Round 4	St Mirren	0 – 1	Motherwell	St Mirren Park
		BBC Sport	Hateley 92'	Attendance: 5,105; Referee: Brines

20 August 2011 SPL Round 5	Hibernian	1 – 2	St Mirren	Easter Road Stadium
	O'Connor 25'	BBC Sport	Thompson 42'; Thomson 45+1'	Attendance: 8,886; Referee: Alan Muir

28 August 2011 SPL Round 6	St Mirren	0 – 2	Celtic	St Mirren Park
		BBC Sport	Hooper 6', 12'	Attendance: 6,223; Referee: Willie Collum

10 September 2011 SPL Round 7	St Mirren	0 – 0	St Johnstone	St Mirren Park
		BBC Sport		Attendance: 3,855; Referee: Mclean

17 September 2011 SPL Round 8	Heart of Midlothian	2 – 0	St Mirren	Tynecastle Stadium
	Hamill 43' (pen.); Mair 70' (o.g.)	BBC Sport		Attendance: 12,572; Referee: Richmond

24 September 2011 SPL Round 9	St Mirren	3 – 0	Kilmarnock	St Mirren Park
	McGowan 32', 45' (pen.); Hasselbaink 85'	BBC Sport		Attendance: 5,013; Referee: Stephen Finnie

1 October 2011 SPL Round 10	Inverness CT	2 – 1	St Mirren	Caledonian Stadium
	Shinnie 31'; Tade 78'	BBC Sport	McAusland 23'	Attendance: 3,249; Referee: Salmond

15 October 2011 SPL Round 11	Rangers	1 – 1	St Mirren	Ibrox Stadium
	Jelavić 48'	BBC Sport	Thompson 90+5'	Attendance: 47,034; Referee: Allan

22 October 2011 SPL Round 12	St Mirren	2 – 3	Hibernian	St Mirren Park
	McGowan 32', 34'	BBC Sport	Griffiths 6', 41'; O'Hanlon 37'	Attendance: 4,273; Referee: Madden

29 October 2011 SPL Round 13	St Johnstone	0 – 1	St Mirren	McDiarmid Park
		BBC Sport	McLean 81'	Attendance: 2,939; Referee: Norris

5 November 2011 SPL Round 14	St Mirren	0 – 0	Heart of Midlothian	St Mirren Park
		BBC Sport		Attendance: 4,771; Referee: Conroy

19 November 2011 SPL Round 15	St Mirren	2 – 1	Dunfermline	St Mirren Park
	Mclean 25'; Hasselbaink 45'	BBC Sport	Cardle 63'	Attendance: 4,363; Referee: Allan

26 November 2011 SPL Round 16	Celtic	5 – 0	St Mirren	Celtic Park
	Samaras 4'; Hooper 8', 53', 57'; McGeouch 72'	BBC Sport		Attendance: 48,406; Referee: McLean

3 December 2011 SPL Round 17	St Mirren	1 – 2	Inverness Caledonian Thistle	St Mirren Park
	Thompson 45+2'	BBC Sport	Shinnie 11'; Hayes 69'	Attendance: 3,675; Referee: Norris

10 December 2011 SPL Round 18	Aberdeen	2 – 2	St Mirren	Pittodrie Stadium
	Vernon 1'; Fallon 17'; Fyvie (red card) 90+2'	BBC Sport	McLean 34'; Carey 52'	Attendance: 9,452; Referee: Finnie

17 December 2011 SPL Round 19	Motherwell	1 – 1	St Mirren	Fir Park
	Higdon 48'	BBC Sport	Goodwin 59'	Attendance: 4,557; Referee: Murray

24 December 2011 SPL Round 20	St Mirren	2 – 1	Rangers	St Mirren Park
	Mooy 44'; McGowan 45+2'	BBC Sport	Wallace 11'; McCulloch (red card) 24'; Goian (yellow card) 87' (yellow-red card)	Attendance: 6,711; Referee: McLean

28 December 2011 SPL Round 21	St Mirren	2 – 2	Dundee United	St Mirren Park
	Thompson 27'; Carey 32'	BBC Sport	Daly 31'; Armstrong 35'	Attendance: 3,811; Referee: Thomson

2 January 2012 SPL Round 22	Kilmarnock	2 – 1	St Mirren	Rugby Park
	Heffernan 34'; Racchi 89'	BBC Sport	Mair 10'	Attendance: 5,986; Referee: Madden

14 January 2012 SPL Round 23	Heart of Midlothian	5 – 2	St Mirren	Tynecastle Stadium
	Žaliūkas 1'; Žaliūkas (red card) 12'; Skácel 23', 64', 68'; Sutton 90'	BBC Report	McGowan 13' (Penalty); Thompson 19'	Attendance: 12,462; Referee: McLean

21 January 2012 SPL Round 24	St Mirren	0 – 2	Celtic	St Mirren Park
		BBC Sport	Forrest 71'; Brown 88'	Attendance: 6,129; Referee: Allan

28 January 2012 SPL Round 25	Inverness CT	0 – 0	St Mirren	Caledonian Stadium
		BBC Sport		Attendance: 3,044; Referee: Finnie

11 February 2012 SPL Round 26	St Mirren	0 – 0	Motherwell	St Mirren Park
		BBC Report		Attendance: 4,204; Referee: Charleston

18 February 2012 SPL Round 27	Dundee United	0 – 0	St Mirren	Tannadice Park
		BBC Sport		Attendance: 6,363; Referee: Winter

25 February 2012 SPL Round 28	St Mirren	1 – 1	Aberdeen	St Mirren Park
	Vernon 57'	BBC Sport	Hasselbaink 59'	Attendance: 3,627; Referee: Steven McLean

3 March 2012 SPL Round 29	Hibernian	0 – 0	St Mirren	Easter Road
		BBC Report		Attendance: 9,211; Referee: Collum

17 March 2012 SPL Round 30	St Mirren	0 – 3	St Johnstone	St Mirren Park
		BBC Report; Guardian Stats	Croft 2'; McCracken 76'; Sandaza 85'	Attendance: 3,768; Referee: Madden

24 March 2012 SPL Round 31	Dunfermline Athletic	1 – 1	St Mirren	East End Park
	Cardle 46'	BBC Sport	Thompson 38'	Attendance: 3,753; Referee: Muir

31 March 2012 SPL Round 32	St Mirren	4 – 2	Kilmarnock	St Mirren Park
	Thompson 24', 83'; Thomson 61'; Hasselbaink 66'	BBC Sport	Van Tornhout 13'; Shiels 89'	Attendance: 4,365; Referee: Colvin

7 April 2012 SPL Round 33	Rangers	3 – 1	St Mirren	Ibrox Stadium
	McCulloch 1'; Little 40'; Lafferty 60' (pen.)	BBC Sport	McGowan 49'; Tesselaar (red card) 51'	Attendance: 46,998; Referee: Collum

21 April 2012 SPL Round 34	St Mirren	4 – 4	Dunfermline Athletic	St Mirren Park
	Hasselbaink 4'; Thompson 43', 48', 67'	BBC Sport	McMillan 24'; Graham 56'; Buchanan 71'; Kirk 88'	Attendance: 3,616; Referee: Brines

29 April 2012 SPL Round 35	St Mirren	1 – 0	Hibernian	St Mirren Park
	McLean 65'; McAusland (yellow card) 78' (red card)	BBC Report	Stevenson (yellow card) 92' (red card)	Attendance: 3,305; Referee: Finnie

2 May 2012 SPL Round 36	Kilmarnock	0 – 2	St Mirren	Rugby Park
		BBC Sport	McGowan 9'; Thompson 45'	Attendance: 3,645; Referee: Beaton

5 May 2012 SPL Round 37	St Mirren	0 – 1	Inverness Caledonian Thistle	St Mirren Park
		BBC Sport	Foran 85'	Attendance: 3,540; Referee: Murray

12 May 2012 SPL Round 38	Aberdeen	0 – 0	St Mirren	Pittodrie Stadium
		BBC Sport		Attendance: 10,716; Referee: Collum

=== Scottish Cup ===
7 January 2012 Scottish Cup round 4	St Mirren	0 – 0	Hamilton Academical	St Mirren Park
		BBC Report		Attendance: 3,091; Referee: Collum

17 January 2012 Scottish Cup round 4 Replay	Hamilton Academical	0 – 1	St Mirren	New Douglas Park
		BBC Report	Carey 21'	Attendance: 1,520; Referee: Collum

4 February 2012 Scottish Cup round 5	St Mirren	1 – 1	Ross County	St Mirren Park
	Thompson 43'	BBC Sport	Brittain 40' (pen.)	Attendance: 3,334; Referee: Madden

14 February 2012 Scottish Cup round 5 Replay	Ross County	1 – 2	St Mirren	Victoria Park
	Morrow 55'	BBC Report	Teale 14'; Thompson (red card) 37'; Hasselbaink 53'	Attendance: 2,334; Referee: Madden

10 March 2012 Scottish Cup QF	Heart of Midlothian	2 – 2	St Mirren	Tynecastle Stadium
	Beattie 37'; Skacel 48'	BBC Report	Carey 27'; Žaliūkas 84' (Own goal)	Attendance: 8,859; Referee: O'Reilly

21 March 2012 Scottish Cup QF Replay	St Mirren	0 – 2	Heart of Midlothian	St Mirren Park
		BBC Report	Hamill 31'; Skacel 86'	Attendance: 5,291; Referee: O'Reilly

=== Scottish League Cup ===
23 August 2011 Scottish League Cup round 2	Greenock Morton	3 – 4	St Mirren	Cappielow, Greenock
	Tidser 17'; MacDonald 27'; Jackson 79'	BBC Sport	Teale 8'; Thompson 55', 66'; Hasselbaink 60'	Attendance: 4,959; Referee: Calum Murray

20 September 2011 Scottish League Cup round 3	St Johnstone	0 – 2	St Mirren	McDiarmid Park
		BBC Sport	Adams 39' (o.g.); Goodwin 45'	Attendance: 2,296; Referee: Craig Thomson

25 October 2011 Scottish League Cup Quarter-Final	St Mirren	0 – 1	Ayr United	St Mirren Park
		BBC Report	Smith 81'	Attendance: 4,570; Referee: O'Reilly

== Squad information ==
=== Captains ===
No.	P	Name	Country	No. games	Notes
6	MF	Jim Goodwin	(Republic of Ireland)	38	Club captain

Last updated: 13 May 2012
Source: Competitive match reports.
Competitive matches only
Matches started as captain only
Country: FIFA nationality; No.: Squad number; P: Position; Name: Player name; No. Games: Number of games started as captain.

=== Players ===
Last updated 13 May 2012

No.	Pos	Nat	Player	Total		SPL		Scottish Cup		League Cup	
No.	Pos	Nat	Player	Apps	Goals	Apps	Goals	Apps	Goals	Apps	Goals
1	GK	(Scotland) SCO	Craig Samson	47	0	38	0	6	0	3	0
2	DF	(Republic of Ireland) IRL	David van Zanten	43	0	35	0	5	0	3	0
3	DF	(Scotland) SCO	David Barron	21	0	17	0	4	0	0	0
4	DF	(Scotland) SCO	Darren McGregor	9	0	9	0	0	0	0	0
5	DF	(Scotland) SCO	Lee Mair	43	1	34	1	6	0	3	0
6	MF	(Republic of Ireland) IRL	Jim Goodwin	38	2	31	1	4	0	3	1
7	MF	(Scotland) SCO	Hugh Murray	9	0	7	0	2	0	0	0
8	MF	(Scotland) SCO	Steven Thomson	31	2	24	2	4	0	3	0
9	FW	(Scotland) SCO	Steven Thompson	44	16	36	13	5	1	3	2
10	FW	(Scotland) SCO	Paul McGowan	45	8	37	8	5	0	3	0
11	FW	(Netherlands) NED	Nigel Hasselbaink	42	8	34	6	5	1	3	1
12	GK	(Scotland) SCO	Graeme Smith	0	0	0	0	0	0	0	0
13	MF	(Scotland) SCO	Joe McKee	2	0	2	0	0	0	0	0
14	DF	(Scotland) SCO	Marc McAusland	40	1	32	1	5	0	3	0
15	MF	(Australia) AUS	Aaron Mooy	12	1	8	1	4	0	0	0
16	FW	(Scotland) SCO	Paul McQuade	1	0	1	0	0	0	0	0
17	MF	(Scotland) SCO	Kenny McLean	33	4	28	4	3	0	2	0
18	MF	(Scotland) SCO	Jamie McKernon	0	0	0	0	0	0	0	0
19	FW	(Scotland) SCO	Jon McShane	14	0	10	0	1	0	3	0
20	DF	(Scotland) SCO	Dominic Kennedy	0	0	0	0	0	0	0	0
21	MF	(Scotland) SCO	Gary Teale	43	2	34	0	6	1	3	1
22	DF	(Netherlands) NED	Jeroen Tesselaar	41	0	33	0	5	0	3	0
23	MF	(Republic of Ireland) IRL	Graham Carey	36	4	29	2	6	2	1	0
24	MF	(Netherlands) NED	Ilias Haddad	11	0	10	0	0	0	1	0
25	GK	(England) ENG	Adam McHugh	0	0	0	0	0	0	0	0
27	FW	(Scotland) SCO	Dougie Imrie	14	0	14	0	0	0	0	0
37	DF	(Scotland) SCO	Jason Naismith	2	0	2	0	0	0	0	0
39	FW	(Scotland) SCO	Thomas Reilly	4	0	4	0	0	0	0	0

=== Disciplinary record ===
Includes all competitive matches.

Last updated 13 May 2012

Number	Nation	Position	Name	Scottish Premier League		League Cup		Scottish Cup		Total	
Number	Nation	Position	Name	Yellow card	Red card	Yellow card	Red card	Yellow card	Red card	Yellow card	Red card
1	(Scotland)	GK	Craig Samson	0	0	1	0	0	0	1	0
2	(Republic of Ireland)	DF	David van Zanten	4	0	1	0	0	0	5	0
3	(Scotland)	DF	David Barron	3	0	1	0	0	0	4	0
4	(Scotland)	DF	Darren McGregor	1	0	0	0	0	0	1	0
5	(Scotland)	DF	Lee Mair	6	0	2	0	0	0	8	0
6	(Republic of Ireland)	MF	Jim Goodwin	12	0	2	0	0	0	14	0
7	(Scotland)	MF	Hugh Murray	0	0	0	0	0	0	0	0
8	(Scotland)	MF	Steven Thomson	1	0	0	0	0	0	1	0
9	(Scotland)	FW	Steven Thompson	6	0	0	0	1	1	7	1
10	(Scotland)	FW	Paul McGowan	9	0	1	0	1	0	11	0
11	(Netherlands)	FW	Nigel Hasselbaink	4	1	1	0	0	0	5	1
12	(Scotland)	GK	Graeme Smith	0	0	0	0	0	0	0	0
13	(Scotland)	MF	Joe McKee	0	0	0	0	0	0	0	0
14	(Scotland)	DF	Marc McAusland	8	1	1	0	0	0	9	1
15	(Australia)	MF	Aaron Mooy	0	0	0	0	0	0	0	0
16	(Scotland)	FW	Paul McQuade	0	0	0	0	0	0	0	0
17	(Scotland)	MF	Kenny McLean	2	0	0	0	0	0	2	0
18	(Scotland)	MF	Jamie McKernon	0	0	0	0	0	0	0	0
19	(Scotland)	FW	Jon McShane	0	0	0	0	0	0	0	0
20	(Scotland)	DF	Dominic Kennedy	0	0	0	0	0	0	0	0
21	(Scotland)	MF	Gary Teale	1	0	0	0	0	0	1	0
22	(Netherlands)	DF	Jeroen Tesselaar	1	1	0	0	1	0	2	1
23	(Republic of Ireland)	MF	Graham Carey	3	0	1	0	0	0	4	0
24	(Netherlands)	MF	Ilias Haddad	2	0	0	0	0	0	2	0
25	(England)	GK	Adam McHugh	0	0	0	0	0	0	0	0
27	(Scotland)	FW	Dougie Imrie	6	0	0	0	0	0	6	0
39	(Scotland)	FW	Thomas Reilly	0	0	0	0	0	0	0	0
46	(Scotland)	DF	Jason Naismith	1	0	0	0	0	0	1	0

=== Top scorer ===
Last updated on 13 May 2012

Position	Nation	Number	Name	Scottish Premier League	League Cup	Scottish Cup	Total
FW	(Scotland)	9	Steven Thompson	13	2	1	16
FW	(Netherlands)	11	Nigel Hasselbaink	6	1	1	8
FW	(Scotland)	10	Paul McGowan	8			8
MF	(Republic of Ireland)	23	Graham Carey	2		2	4
MF	(Scotland)	17	Kenny McLean	4			4
MF	(Republic of Ireland)	6	Jim Goodwin	1	1		2
MF	(Scotland)	21	Gary Teale		1	1	2
MF	(Scotland)	8	Steven Thomson	2			2
DF	(Scotland)	14	Marc McAusland	1			1
MF	(Australia)	15	Aaron Mooy	1			1
MF	(Scotland)	5	Lee Mair	1			1

== Team statistics ==
=== League table ===
Pos	Team	Pld	W	D	L	GF	GA	GD	Pts	Qualification or relegation
6	St Johnstone	38	14	8	16	43	50	−7	50	Qualification for the Europa League second qualifying round (Note: Hearts qualified for the Europa League as 2011–12 Scottish Cup winners. Since they finished fifth in the league, the sixth-placed team, St Johnstone, also qualified for the Europa League.)
7	Kilmarnock	38	11	14	13	44	61	−17	47	
8	St Mirren	38	9	16	13	39	51	−12	43	
9	Aberdeen	38	9	14	15	36	44	−8	41	
10	Inverness Caledonian Thistle	38	10	9	19	42	60	−18	39	

Source: SPFL Archive
Rules for classification: 1) points; 2) goal difference; 3) number of goals scored.

== Transfers ==
=== Players in ===
Date	Player	From	Fee
1 June 2011	(Scotland) Steven Thompson	(England) Burnley	Free
6 June 2011	(Scotland) Paul McGowan	(Scotland) Celtic	Free
6 June 2011	(Netherlands) Nigel Hasselbaink	(Scotland) Hamilton	Free
9 June 2011	(Scotland) Graeme Smith	(Scotland) St Johnstone	Free
1 July 2011	(Scotland) Gary Teale	(England) Sheffield Wednesday	Free
8 July 2011	(Republic of Ireland) Graham Carey	(Scotland) Celtic	Free
15 July 2011	(Netherlands) Jeroen Tesselaar	(Netherlands) AZ Alkmaar	Free
19 August 2011	(Netherlands) Ilias Haddad	(Netherlands) AZ Alkmaar	Free
23 August 2011	(Scotland) Joe McKee	(England) Burnley	Loan
20 January 2012	(Scotland) Dougie Imrie	(Scotland) Hamilton Academical	£35,000

=== Players out ===
Player	To	Fee
(Scotland) John Potter	(Scotland) Dunfermline Athletic	Free
(Scotland) Craig Dargo	(Scotland) Partick Thistle	Free
(Scotland) Gareth Wardlaw	(Scotland) Ayr United	Free
(Scotland) Garry Brady	(Scotland) Brechin City	Free
(Republic of Ireland) Patrick Cregg	(England) Bury	Free
(Scotland) Sean Lynch	(Scotland) Airdrie United	Free
(England) Nick Hegarty	(England) Mansfield Town	Free
(Scotland) Jamie McCluskey	(Scotland) Dundee	Free
(Scotland) Mark McLennan	(Scotland) Irvine Meadow XI	Free
(Scotland) Ally Love	(Scotland) East Stirlingshire	Free
(England) Michael Higdon	(Scotland) Motherwell	Free
(Scotland) Paul Gallacher	(Scotland) Dunfermline Athletic	Free
(Scotland) Ryan Frances	(Scotland) East Stirlingshire	Free
(Scotland) Conor Ramsay	(Scotland) Greenock Morton	Free
(Scotland) Creag Little	(Scotland) Greenock Morton	Free
(Scotland) Graeme Ramage	(Scotland) Dumbarton	Free
(Scotland) Jamie McKernon	(Scotland) Ayr United	Loan
(England) Adam McHugh	(Scotland) Forfar Athletic	Loan
(Slovenia) Jure Travner	(Bulgaria) Ludogorets	Free
(Scotland) Paul McQuade	(Scotland) East Fife	Free
(Scotland) Dominic Kennedy	(Scotland) Dumbarton	Loan
(Scotland) Bradley Coyne	(Scotland) East Stirlingshire	Loan
(Scotland) Peter Bradley	(Scotland) Queen's Park	Free
(Scotland) Thomas Reilly	(Scotland) Albion Rovers	Loan
(Scotland) Garry Campbell	Free agent	Free
(Netherlands) Ilias Haddad	(Bulgaria) CSKA Sofia	Free
(Scotland) Mark Lamont	(Scotland) Dumbarton	Loan
(Scotland) Jon McShane	(Scotland) Hamilton Academical	Loan
(Scotland) Bradley Coyne	(Scotland) Forfar Athletic	Free

== See also ==
- List of St Mirren F.C. seasons
