= Barry Cuddihy =

Scottish footballer

Personal information
- Date of birth: 19 December 1996 (age 29)
- Place of birth: Glasgow, Scotland
- Position: Midfielder

Team information
- Current team: Clyde
- Number: 6

Senior career*
Years	Team	Apps	(Gls)
2015–2016	St Mirren	6	(0)
2016	→ Annan Athletic (loan)	10	(0)
2016–2017	Annan Athletic	23	(2)
2017–	Clyde	216	(11)
- * Club domestic league appearances and goals as of 4 May 2026

Barry Cuddihy (born 19 December 1996) is a Scottish footballer who plays as a midfielder for Scottish League Two club Clyde. Cuddihy has previously played for St Mirren and Annan Athletic.

== Career ==
Born in Glasgow, Cuddihy began his career at St Mirren. He was an unused substitute in three of their 2013–14 Scottish Premiership matches, starting with a 1–1 home draw with Heart of Midlothian on 29 December 2013. He made his debut on 25 April 2015, playing three minutes as a substitute for Thomas Reilly at the end of a 4–1 win over Kilmarnock, and made two more substitute appearances as the season ended with relegation.

On 12 March 2016, Cuddihy moved to Annan Athletic of Scottish League Two on an emergency loan. He made his debut later that day, playing the entirety of a 4–2 loss at East Fife. He was released by St Mirren at the end of the 2015–16 season.

After leaving St Mirren, Cuddihy returned to Annan Athletic on a one-year deal. He was subsequently signed for Clyde in July 2017 by former Annan manager Jim Chapman.

== Career statistics ==
As of match played 06 November 2021

Appearances and goals by club, season and competition
Club	Season	League			Scottish Cup		League Cup		Other		Total	
Club	Season	Division	Apps	Goals	Apps	Goals	Apps	Goals	Apps	Goals	Apps	Goals
St Mirren	2014–15	Scottish Premiership	3	0	0	0	0	0	—		3	0
St Mirren	2015–16	Scottish Championship	3	0	0	0	1	0	2 (Note: Appearances in the Scottish Challenge Cup)	0	6	0
St Mirren	St Mirren total		6	0	0	0	1	0	2	0	9	0
Annan Athletic (loan)	2015–16	Scottish League Two	10	0	0	0	0	0	0	0	10	0
Annan Athletic	2016–17	Scottish League Two	23	2	3	0	4	0	2 (Note: Appearances in the League One play-offs)	0	32	2
Clyde	2017–18	Scottish League Two	34	3	2	0	4	0	1	0	41	3
Clyde	2018–19	Scottish League Two	33	1	1	0	4	0	2	0	40	1
Clyde	2019–20	Scottish League One	22	1	3	0	4	0	4	0	33	1
Clyde	2020–21	Scottish League One	22	1	2	1	4	1	0	0	28	3
Clyde	2021–22	Scottish League One	9	0	0	0	4	0	1	0	14	0
Clyde	Clyde total		120	6	8	1	20	1	8	0	156	8
Career total			159	8	11	1	25	1	12	0	207	10
