= Jeroen Tesselaar =

Dutch footballer

Personal information
- Full name: Jeroen Tesselaar
- Date of birth: 16 January 1989 (age 37)
- Place of birth: Wognum, Netherlands
- Height: 1.83 m (6 ft 0 in)
- Position: Left back

Team information
- Current team: Quick Boys
- Number: 25

Youth career
- Spartanen Wognum
- 2001–2003: HVV Hollandia
- 2003–2008: AZ Alkmaar

Senior career*
Years	Team	Apps	(Gls)
2008–2011	AZ Alkmaar	0	(0)
2008–2011	→ Telstar	60	(2)
2011–2012	St Mirren	33	(0)
2012–2014	Kilmarnock	62	(0)
2014–2015	St Mirren	32	(1)
2015–2016	De Graafschap	21	(0)
2016–2017	Hapoel Ramat Gan	22	(1)
2017–2018	Hapoel Katamon	29	(0)
2019–	Quick Boys	36	(0)
- * Club domestic league appearances and goals as of 09:30, 16 November 2020 (UTC)

Jeroen Tesselaar (born 16 January 1989) is a Dutch former professional footballer who played primarily as a left back for Tweede Divisie club Quick Boys. He has previously played for AZ Alkmaar, Telstar, Kilmarnock, St Mirren and De Graafschap, before moving into semi-professional football.

== Career ==
=== AZ ===
Tesselaar started his professional career in his native Netherlands with HVV Hollandia at age thirteen before joining AZ Alkmaar. In the 2008–09 season, Tesselaar signed his first professional contract, which will keep him until 2010. He did not make a league appearance for the club, but played on loan for Telstar for three seasons with AZ players Furdjel Narsingh and Kevin Brands.

At the end of the 2010–11 season, Tesselaar was among eleven players to be released.

=== St Mirren ===
After leaving AZ, Tesselaar went on trial with Scottish Premier League club St Mirren. The first time he arrived there, he said about the club, "[I] didn't know what the group wanted but, after the first week, we saw a little movie of Barcelona and how they press the ball."

On 14 July 2011, Tesselaar would later signed for St Mirren on a one-year deal after making impressive display on trial. Upon joining St Mirren, Tesselaar cited joining the club as "efforts to play total football." He made his debut against Dunfermline at East End Park on 25 July. On 20 August, he assisted both St Mirren goals for Steven Thomson, who scored both goals in a 2–1 victory at Easter Road against Hibernian.

Tesselaar never thought what to expect, but finds the quality good. Tesselaar quickly settled in Scotland and played regularly during the 2011–12 Scottish Premier League season, but their good performances led manager Danny Lennon to offer both Tesselaar and Nigel Hasselbaink improved contracts, only the offer of a new contract at St Mirren to be rejected despite captain Jim Goodwin pleading the duo to sign a new contract. Though making thirty-three appearances, Tesselaar was absent due to an injury that kept him out for six weeks.

=== Kilmarnock ===
Tesselaar signed for Kilmarnock in June 2012 on a two-year contract despite interests from Aberdeen. On his move, Manager Kenny Shiels told STV, "We're really happy to get him on board because we've lost Ben Gordon so now we've got competition between Rory McKeown and Jeroen."

Tesselaar made his debut for the club, in the opening game of the season, as Kilmarnock drew 0–0 with Dundee, where he started as a left-back in defense. After making four appearances, Tesselaar sustained an injury during a match against Stenhousemuir, in the first round of the Scottish League Cup, which Kilmarnock lose 2–1. Tesselaar was out for six weeks due to a hamstring injury. After two months out, Tesselaar made his return, where he came on for James Dayton in the last minutes, as they beat Celtic, to give their first win at Celtic Park for the first time since 1955. He made his first start since being injured, as Kilmarnock beat Ross County 3–0 on 9 November 2012. He finished his first season at the club, making twenty-six appearances.

In his second season, Tesselaar continues to remain in the left-back position until he came off in the sixth minutes in the first half, in a 1–1 draw against Partick Thistle on 21 September 2013.

During the season, Tesselaar broke his nose in four occasion that he might wear a protective mask for the rest of his career. In a match against Hearts on 8 March 2014, Tesselaar made national headlines in the Netherlands when he made fabulous way through the legs of Jordan McGhee and then he gave the ball which was scored by Michael Gardyne, in a 4–2 victory. At the end of the 2013–14 season, Tesselaar was offered a new contract by the club. While negotiating a new contract, Tesselaar faced uncertainty over his future: "I'm open to everything. A new club is a nice adventure." However, Tesselaar left Kilmarnock in late June.

=== Return to St Mirren ===
Tesselaar re-joined St Mirren on a one-year deal, after leaving Kilmarnock at the end of season 2013–14. The Dutchman previously played for the Saints during season 2011–12 in the Scottish Premier League, making 33 league appearances.

Tesselaar's second spell at St Mirren came in the opening game of the season, playing as a left-back, in a 1–0 loss against Motherwell. Tesselaar made his 50th appearance, in a 2–1 loss against Celtic before coming off by half time, due to an injury. Tesselaar then suffered a knee injury that kept him out before scoring and assisting on his return, in a 2–2 draw against Ross County on 25 October 2014. However, Tesselaar came under pressure from St Mirren supporters after an interview with Voetbal International, claiming about negativity of the town of Paisley. Tesselaar later denied those statement he made in the Voetbal International. Nevertheless, Tesselaar continued to be in the first team regular throughout the season.

On 29 May 2015, Tesselaar left Saints for a second time in his career, making a total of 36 appearances and scoring once.

=== Later career ===
Tesselaar signed a one-year deal with Eredivisie side, De Graafschap on 14 August 2015 after a successful trial period.

He has played for Hapoel Ramat Gan and Hapoel Katamon in Israel.

== Personal life ==
Tesselaar is an avid photographer and considered taking photos his second hobby after buying his first camera when he was sixteen. He often bikes or walks to take pictures and took pictures in black and white when he attended photography school.
