= Paul McGowan (footballer) =

Scottish footballer

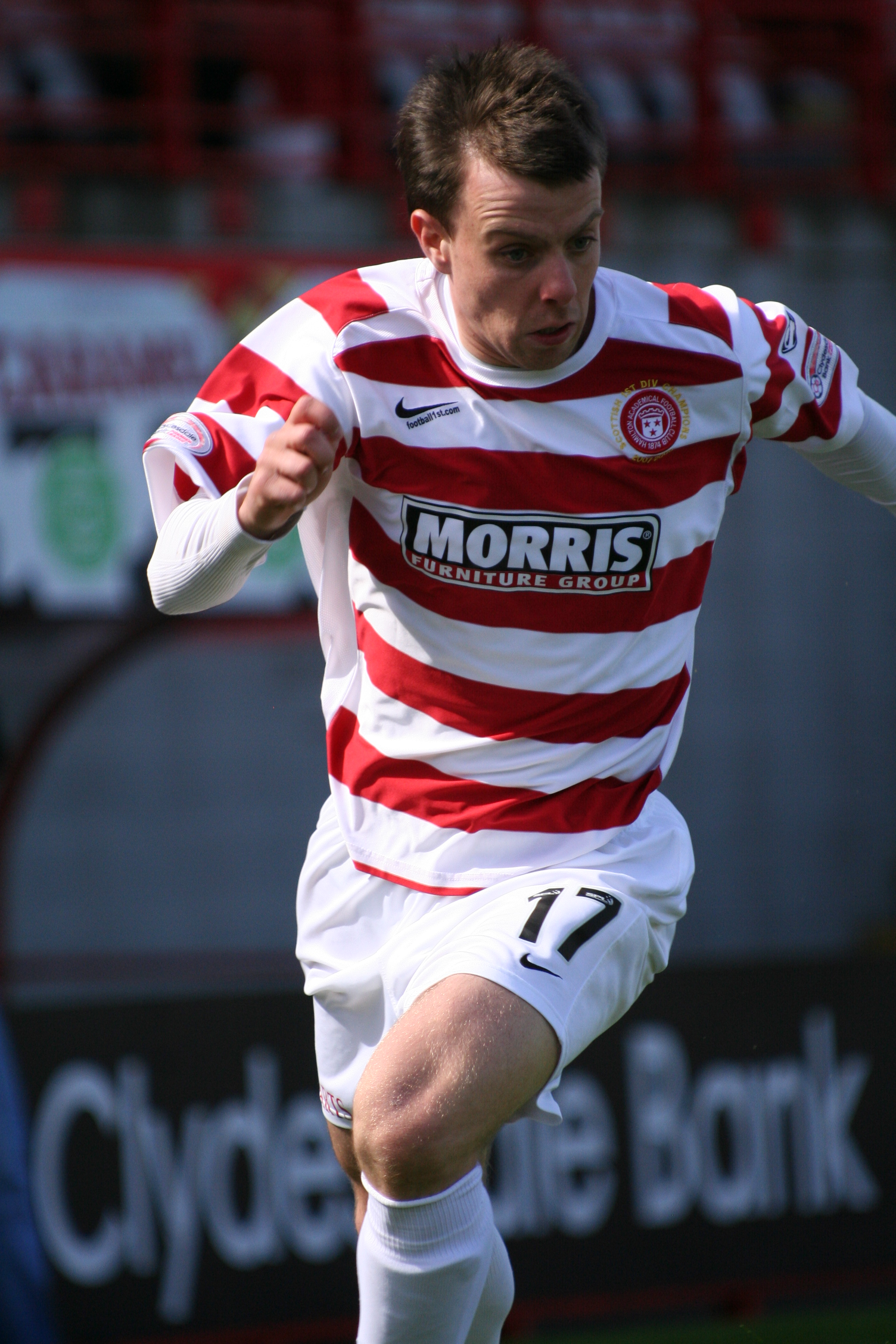
- McGowan playing for Hamilton Academical

Personal information
- Date of birth: 7 October 1987 (age 39)
- Place of birth: Bellshill, Scotland
- Height: 1.71 m (5 ft 7 in)
- Position: Attacking midfielder

Youth career
- 2000–2006: Celtic

Senior career*
Years	Team	Apps	(Gls)
2006–2011	Celtic	6	(0)
2006–2007	→ Greenock Morton (loan)	36	(11)
2009	→ Hamilton Academical (loan)	14	(1)
2010–2011	→ St Mirren (loan)	33	(1)
2011–2014	St Mirren	98	(17)
2014–2023	Dundee	245	(15)
2023	→ Dunfermline Athletic (loan)	11	(1)
2023–2024	Cove Rangers	26	(2)
2024–2026	Annan Athletic	61	(1)
Total		530	(49)
- * Club domestic league appearances and goals

Paul McGowan (born 7 October 1987) is a Scottish former professional footballer who played as an attacking midfielder.

McGowan started his career with Scottish Premier League club Celtic, but struggled to break into the first team and was sent out on loan several times. He spent the 2006–07 season with third-tier side Morton, where he won the Second Division title and received individual accolades. Having made only two appearances following his return to Celtic, he spent the second half of the 2008–09 season with Hamilton Academical in the SPL.

He moved on loan to another SPL side, St Mirren, for the 2010–11 season, after which Celtic released him from his contract and he signed with St Mirren permanently. In December 2011 he won the SPL player of the month award, and won the Scottish League Cup with the club in 2013.

He joined Dundee in June 2014 and would become a mainstay and a key player for the side throughout his 9-year tenure there, making over 300 appearances for the Dark Blues. He would join Dunfermline Athletic on loan in 2023 and would earn winner's medals for both the Scottish Championship and the Scottish League One in the same season. After Dundee, McGowan spent a season with Cove Rangers and then spent two seasons with Annan Athletic before retiring in 2026.

== Career ==
=== Celtic ===
McGowan came through the youth system at Celtic, at which time he was considered primarily to be a striker.

==== Loan to Greenock Morton ====
McGowan was loaned out to Greenock Morton for the 2006–07 season. He played as a striker for Morton and scored a total of 16 goals in 44 competitive matches. During his spell at Cappielow, McGowan won the Scottish Football League's young player of the month award for January 2007. He was the club's top scorer and received a winner's medal as Morton won the Scottish Second Division. He was chosen to the 'Team of the year' in the Second Division and 3rd place in the 'Player of the Year' award. Morton failed to land the player in the summer transfer window when their bid – approaching a six-figure sum – was rejected.

==== Return to Celtic ====
McGowan made his Celtic debut in a 5–0 win over Inverness Caledonian Thistle in September 2007, where he came on as a substitute. It was his only appearance of the season.

He scored his first goal for Celtic on 7 August 2008 in a pre-season friendly against Manchester City at Celtic Park. He had the chance to score another to win the match, but his shot hit the crossbar and the game ended 1–1. McGowan made his UEFA Champions League debut against Villarreal on 10 December 2008, as a 75th-minute substitute for Aiden McGeady. Celtic won the match 2–0 but finished bottom of their group, and once again McGowan did not appear for the club again during that campaign.

==== Loan to Hamilton Academical ====
McGowan was loaned out to SPL side Hamilton Academical at the beginning of the January 2009 transfer window, and started his first game with an assist for Chris Swailes in the 1–0 win over Ross County in the Scottish Cup. His first goal for the club came on 21 February 2009 in a 2–1 win over Falkirk, scoring from 10 yards out. At the end of the 2008–09 season, his loan spell came to an end.

==== Return to Celtic ====
In the 2009–10 season, McGowan became part of the Celtic first team squad under manager Tony Mowbray. On 17 December 2009, just over a year to the day of his European bow, McGowan made his Europa League debut in a 3–3 draw away to Rapid Vienna; he made an impact in the 91st minute by scoring his first competitive goal for the Hoops to complete a comeback from 3–0 down to draw 3–3. On 24 January 2010, McGowan made an impressive display when he provided assists for both Marc-Antoine Fortuné and Paddy McCourt, as Celtic made a comeback from 1–0 down to win 4–1 against St Johnstone.

On 29 April 2010, he signed a two-year contract with Celtic. Having signed the new deal, McGowan stated in May 2010 that he expected to make more appearances in the first team in the near future, but in fact he had already made his final appearance for the club the previous week.

=== Loan to St Mirren ===
In July 2010, McGowan was again sent out on loan, this time to St Mirren. He made his league debut for the club in the opening game of the 2010–11 season, a 1–1 draw against Dundee United on 14 August 2010. He scored his first competitive goal for the Buddies in a Scottish League Cup match against Ross County – St Mirren lost in the penalty-shootout when the tie ended 2–2 after normal time and 3–3 after extra-time. In September 2010, McGowan received a straight red card for an off-the-ball violent incident involving Manuel Pascali of Kilmarnock, which was spotted by the referee. He was then observed to make a rude hand gesture at opposing fans who had been taunting him. After the match, McGowan apologised for his actions, while his manager Danny Lennon stated a fine would be considered once video evidence had been reviewed. After missing one game, he made his return from suspension on 25 September and scored his first goal, in a 2–1 loss against Inverness Caledonian Thistle.

In January 2011, McGowan scored the first hat-trick of his career in a 6–1 win over Peterhead in a fourth round replay in the Scottish Cup. Lennon described McGowan as a "threat", who needed to rise above difficult treatment, advising him to learn from the attitude of Lionel Messi. Throughout the season, he played a total of 39 matches and scored 6 goals in all competitions for St Mirren. Danny Lennon converted McGowan from a striker to a central attacking midfielder with the role of playmaker during this period.

=== Permanent move to St Mirren ===
On 6 June 2011, McGowan signed a two-year deal with St Mirren, having had a successful loan spell. McGowan's first game after signing for the club on a permanent basis came on the opening game of the season, in a 0–0 draw against Dunfermline Athletic. In a 2–0 loss against his former club, on 28 August 2011, McGowan made a mistake when he misplaced a pass, allowing Gary Hooper to score, but Lennon praised him in spite of this, while McGowan himself stated he would take full responsibility for his performance. He scored a brace in a 3–0 victory against Kilmarnock in September 2011, and netted two more on 22 October 2011 in a 3–2 loss against Hibernian. In November 2011, McGowan attracted interest from English clubs, believed to be Crystal Palace and Wigan. He won the Scottish Premier League player of the month award for December 2011. McGowan revealed he was surprised to receive the award, and was the first Saints player to win it since Andy Dorman in April 2009. McGowan gained plaudits for his ability to retain possession of the ball. Throughout the season, he played a total of 45 matches and scored 8 goals in all competitions for St Mirren.

After scoring two goals at the outset of the 2012–13 season (in a 5–1 win over Ayr United in first round of the Scottish League Cup, and in a 3–1 loss against Kilmarnock on 22 September 2012), McGowan suffered a shoulder injury that required surgery. While on the sideline, captain Jim Goodwin stated the club missed McGowan he was a major player. McGowan returned to the first team in mid-Decemberand went on to score a penalty against former employers Celtic in the Scottish League Cup semi-final; St Mirren qualified for the final with an unexpected 3–2 win. Ahead of the 2013 Scottish League Cup Final, McGowan scored and provided an assist for Graham Carey in a 2–0 league win over Heart of Midlothian, and in the showpiece event itself at Hampden Park, he was named 'man of the match' in the Buddies 3–2 victory over the same opposition as the club ended its 26-year wait for silverware. After the match, McGowan told BBC Scotland that he felt "very proud". A few weeks after the final, McGowan scored a penalty in a 1–1 draw against Celtic.

Towards the end of the 2012–13 season, McGowan admitted that his future was uncertain, having attracted interest from English clubs, with one believed to be Birmingham City after manager Lennon revealed he had yet to sort out his future at the club by signing a new deal. Eventually, on 3 June 2013, it was announced that McGowan had re-signed for St Mirren on a free transfer, just two days after his previous contract had expired. After signing a new contract, he cited family reasons as his basis for staying in Paisley.

In the 2013–14 season, McGowan started off his season by struggling to score for the eight games, netting his first of the season on 5 October 2013, in a 2–0 win over Hearts. He scored another, as well as two assists, in a 4–3 win over St Johnstone on 19 October. In the match against Inverness Caledonian Thistle, McGowan limped off where he sustained a broken toe, and later had to wear a protective mask in the fourth round replay of the Scottish Cup against Queen of the South. Despite being disciplined by the club for an incident away from football, McGowan continued to play, adding two more goals to his tally; one was against Dundee United on 15 March 2014 and the other against Hibernian on 19 April 2014, to help the club secure their future in the Scottish Premiership. After the latter match, McGowan stated he was happy to put the disciplinary incident behind him by helping the club finish the season on a high. At the end of season 2013–14, St Mirren announced that McGowan would not be offered a new contract and he was released.

=== Dundee ===
McGowan signed a two-year contract with newly promoted side Dundee in June 2014. Upon joining Dundee, Manager Paul Hartley stated he immediately sought to signed him once he learned he was released by St Mirren.

McGowan made his Dundee debut, playing as a central midfielder, as Dundee won 4–0 against Peterhead on 2 August 2014 in the Scottish League Cup, and then made his league debut as Dundee drew 1–1 with Kilmarnock on 9 August 2014. McGowan continued to be in the first team throughout the first half of the season until he suffered a knee injury that kept him sidelined for four weeks. He made his return to the first team in the Dundee derby, which Dundee lost 6–2 to Dundee United. McGowan scored his first Dundee goal in the last minute in a 1–0 win over Partick Thistle on 14 February 2015. As a result of being placed on a court-imposed curfew for another incident outside football, McGowan could not be included in the matchday squad for evening kick-offs for the remainder of the season, though he was still available for afternoon games.

During a League Cup group stage match against Forfar Athletic in 2016, McGowan chipped Grant Adam on the edge of the box to open the scoring in a 7–0 win for Dundee. He then scored in the opening league game of the 2016–17 season, a 3–1 win over Ross County in Dingwall, however afterwards Dundee would go into a six-game losing streak which saw the club involved in a relegation fight. On 29 October, McGowan scored a crucial winning goal in a 1–0 victory over Hamilton. Just before Christmas he scored an equalising goal against Hearts as Dundee came from 2–0 down to win 3–2. Towards the end of the season McGowan assisted Marcus Haber to score in a crucial match against Kilmarnock in a 1–0 win to help Dundee steer clear of relegation during Neil McCann's reign as interim manager.

McGowan scored his first goal of the 2017–18 season against Dundee United in the Dundee Derby to win the game 2–1, beating Harry Lewis from 20 yards. He picked up his second goal of the season with another long-range strike in a 1–1 draw with Motherwell at Fir Park. While not netting for the rest of the season, McGowan was a key player in once again keeping the Dee in the Premiership. After St Johnstone manager Tommy Wright confirmed his interest in signing him, McGowan signed a new one-year contract extension with Dundee with the option of a further year.

McGowan remained an important piece in the 2018–19 season, but had to endure a horrible season where the club managed just five league wins all season, and only one of them being at home, en route to relegation. Despite the dismal season, McGowan managed a couple of league goals during the season, both against Hibernian. The first was a crucial equaliser at Easter Road in November during Dundee's most successful spell of the season, and the second also being an equaliser at Dens, though Dundee would eventually lose the game.

As the 2019–20 season began, McGowan was given the captain's armband many times, and scored two key penalties in shootouts during Dundee's League Cup group stage matches to help them top the group. McGowan would get his scoring underway in his 200th appearance for the club, scoring the opener against Partick Thistle, though a late Dundee collapse would ruin the day. He went on to score the next week, away to Ayr United with what would prove to be the game-winning goal in a 2–1 victory. McGowan would next find the net on 14 December, scoring against Dunfermline Athletic in a 4–3 victory, and followed that up with his second goal in as many games the next week, once again netting against Partick in an away win. McGowan continued being a key player for the Dark Blues until the season was ended early due to the COVID-19 pandemic. After the season was brought to a close, McGowan was named the winner of the Andrew De Vries Player of the Year Award for the 2019–20 season. As one of the Dundee players due to have his contract expire in June and with many club officials and players on furlough due to the pandemic, McGowan's contract was extended until July in order to give more time for discussions. McGowan signed a one-year extension with Dundee near the end of June 2020, agreeing to drop his wages significantly for the year to help the club cope better with the coronavirus crisis.

In April 2021, an appearance clause in his contract triggered a further one-year extension in McGowan's contract, keeping him with Dundee until the summer of 2022. He would play a prominent role in Dundee's success in the Premiership play-offs, and helped the club gain promotion back to the Premiership. In January 2022, McGowan would once again agree a one-year contract extension, taking him into his ninth season with the club.

McGowan would mark his 300th appearance for the Dark Blues in September 2022, in what would be his first for the club outside of Scotland as Dundee defeated Welsh champions The New Saints away in the Scottish Challenge Cup. He would spend several months out with a knee injury.

==== Loan to Dunfermline Athletic ====
On 21 February 2023, McGowan reunited with former teammate and manager James McPake after joining Scottish League One club Dunfermline Athletic on loan until the end of the season. On 25 February, McGowan made his debut for the Pars as a substitute in an away league win against Queen of the South. He would win the Scottish League One with Dunfermline on 15 April 2023, in a 5–0 home win against Queen of the South. McGowan would score his first goal for the Pars in their final game of the season on 6 May in an away win against Alloa Athletic.

On 1 June 2023, Dundee would confirm that McGowan had left the club after the completion of his contract.

=== Cove Rangers ===
On 24 July 2023, McGowan joined Scottish League One club Cove Rangers on a one-year deal. He made his debut in a Scottish League Cup group stage match against Livingston. McGowan scored his first goal for Cove Rangers on his 36th birthday in a win against Annan Athletic. At the end of the season, Cove confirmed that McGowan would leave upon the expiry of his contract.

=== Annan Athletic ===
On 27 June 2024, McGowan joined Scottish League One club Annan Athletic. McGowan made his debut for the Galabankies in a win over Inverness Caledonian Thistle in the Scottish League Cup group stage. McGowan scored his first goal for Annan three days later against Bonnyrigg Rose. On 14 September, McGowan grabbed his first league goal of the season with a last-minute equaliser at home to Dumbarton. On 6 June 2025 after Annan's relegation to Scottish League Two, McGowan agreed a one-year extension to remain at Galabank. After that season passed, McGowan left the club in the summer of 2026. In June 2026, McGowan's former teammate and friend Simon Ferry revealed on the Open Goal podcast that McGowan had retired and he had given a speech at a party marking McGowan's retirement.

== Personal life ==
In December 2013, McGowan pleaded guilty to attacking two police officers at Coatbridge police station on 11 August. On 8 January 2014, the sheriff ordered McGowan to do a 130 hours of unpaid work and a one-year supervision order. Manager Danny Lennon believed McGowan was lucky to avoid a jail sentence. McGowan was told by Sheriff Frank Pieri " that the punishment was a 'direct alternative' to custody and told him to behave in future or face prison". As a result of this incident, McGowan was disciplined by the club.

For the second time in 2014, McGowan was arrested after attacking a community support constable at Coatbridge Police station. McGowan was convicted of assault on 19 March 2015. On 15 April 2015, McGowan was spared a jail sentence, but was placed on a restriction curfew for sixteen weeks and had to wear electronic tags, meaning he could not play in midweek matches for the duration of the order as he had to be at home by 7pm each day.

Following the incident, McGowan apologised for his actions and said he hoped to become a better person, having a problematic lifestyle of alcohol and gambling, while the club stood by him. McGowan is a father of a son. In the wake of his conviction in April 2015, he vowed to be a better father by putting his life on track for the sake of his son.

In July 2018 McGowan was again convicted of assault, this time for spitting on a bouncer outside a Dundee nightclub two months earlier after attending the club's annual awards event; he again avoided a prison sentence for the offence and was instead given a community service order.

== Career statistics ==
As of match played 2 May 2026

Appearances and goals by club, season and competition
Club	Season	League			Scottish Cup		League Cup		Other		Total	
Club	Season	Division	Apps	Goals	Apps	Goals	Apps	Goals	Apps	Goals	Apps	Goals
Celtic	2006–07	Scottish Premier League	0	0	0	0	0	0	0	0	0	0
Celtic	2007–08	Scottish Premier League	1	0	0	0	0	0	0	0	1	0
Celtic	2008–09	Scottish Premier League	0	0	0	0	0	0	1 (Note: Appearance in the UEFA Champions League)	0	1	0
Celtic	2009–10	Scottish Premier League	5	0	0	0	0	0	1 (Note: Appearance in the UEFA Europa League)	1	6	1
Celtic	2010–11	Scottish Premier League	0	0	0	0	0	0	0	0	0	0
Celtic	Total		6	0	0	0	0	0	2	1	8	1
Greenock Morton (loan)	2006–07	Scottish Second Division	36	11	3	1	4	1	1 (Note: Appearances in the Scottish Challenge Cup)	1	44	14
Hamilton Academical (loan)	2008–09	Scottish Premier League	15	1	2	0	0	0	—		17	1
St Mirren (loan)	2010–11	Scottish Premier League	33	1	5	4	1	1	—		39	6
St Mirren	2011–12	Scottish Premier League	37	8	5	0	3	0	—		45	8
St Mirren	2012–13	Scottish Premier League	25	5	2	0	4	2	—		31	7
St Mirren	2013–14	Scottish Premiership	36	4	2	0	1	0	—		39	4
St Mirren	Total		98	17	9	0	8	2	0	0	115	19
Dundee	2014–15	Scottish Premiership	30	1	1	0	3	0	—		34	1
Dundee	2015–16	Scottish Premiership	30	1	4	0	1	0	—		35	1
Dundee	2016–17	Scottish Premiership	36	3	1	0	2	1	—		39	4
Dundee	2017–18	Scottish Premiership	34	1	2	0	6	1	—		42	2
Dundee	2018–19	Scottish Premiership	30	2	2	0	4	1	—		36	3
Dundee	2019–20	Scottish Championship	24	4	1	0	5	0	1	0	31	4
Dundee	2020–21	Scottish Championship	25	2	2	0	4	1	4 (Note: Appearances in the Premiership play-offs)	0	35	3
Dundee	2021–22	Scottish Premiership	28	1	3	0	5	1	—		36	2
Dundee	2022–23	Scottish Championship	8	0	0	0	5	1	1	0	14	1
Dundee	Total		245	15	16	0	35	6	6	0	302	21
Dunfermline Athletic (loan)	2022–23	Scottish League One	11	1	—		—		0	0	11	1
Cove Rangers	2023–24	Scottish League One	26	2	3	0	2	0	1	0	32	2
Annan Athletic	2024–25	Scottish League One	35	1	1	0	3	1	6 (Note: Two appearances in the Scottish Challenge Cup, four appearances in the Scottish League One play-offs)	0	45	2
Annan Athletic	2025–26	Scottish League Two	26	0	2	0	4	0	5	0	37	0
Annan Athletic	Total		61	1	3	0	7	1	11	0	82	2
Career total			531	49	41	5	57	11	21	2	650	67

== Honours ==
Greenock Morton

- Scottish Second Division: 2006–07

St Mirren

- Scottish League Cup: 2012–13
- Renfrewshire Cup: 2010, 2011, 2012

Dundee

- Scottish Premiership play-offs: 2020–21

Dunfermline Athletic

- Scottish League One: 2022–23

Individual

- Andrew De Vries Player of the Year: 2019–20
