= Kenny McLean =

Scottish footballer

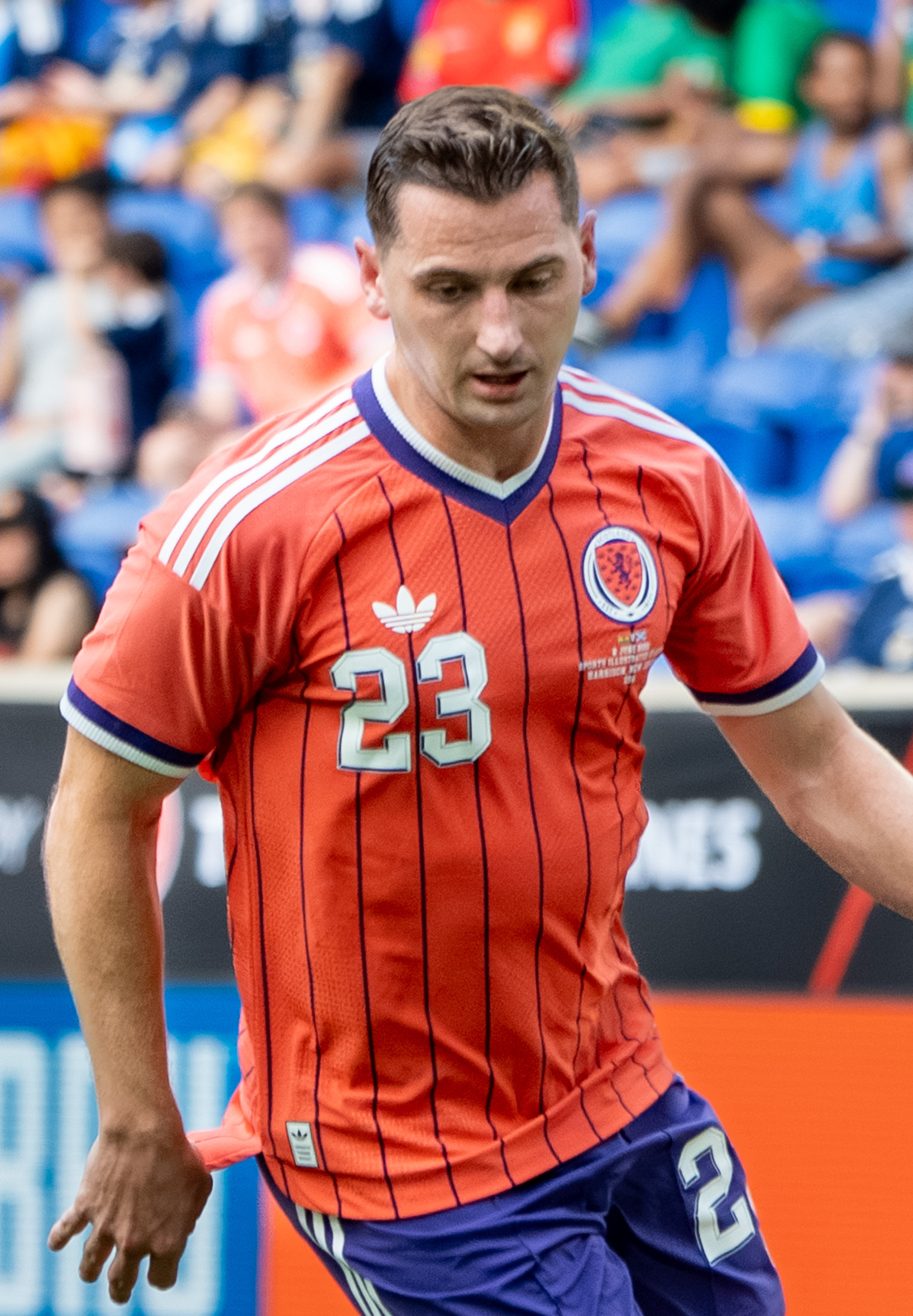
- McLean playing for Scotland in 2026

Personal information
- Full name: Kenneth McLean
- Date of birth: 8 January 1992 (age 34)
- Place of birth: Rutherglen, Lanarkshire, Scotland
- Height: 6 ft 0 in (1.83 m)
- Positions: Central midfielder; left midfielder

Team information
- Current team: Norwich City
- Number: 23

Youth career
- Aberdeen
- 2006–2008: Rangers
- 2008–2009: St Mirren

Senior career*
Years	Team	Apps	(Gls)
2009–2015	St Mirren	131	(20)
2009–2010	→ Arbroath (loan)	20	(1)
2015–2018	Aberdeen	111	(13)
2018–	Norwich City	294	(12)
2018	→ Aberdeen (loan)	15	(5)

International career^{‡}
2010	Scotland U19	1	(0)
2011–2014	Scotland U21	11	(0)
2016–	Scotland	61	(3)
- * Club domestic league appearances and goals as of 09:10, 22 November 2026 (UTC) ‡ National team caps and goals as of 07:50, 25 June 2026 (UTC)

Kenneth McLean (born 8 January 1992) is a Scottish professional footballer who plays as a central midfielder or left midfielder for EFL Championship club Norwich City, whom he captains, and the Scotland national team.

After being released by Rangers' youth team, McLean started his senior career at SPL club St Mirren. He went on loan to Second Division side Arbroath for the second half of the 2009–10 season, before returning to St Mirren and breaking into the first team. He moved to Aberdeen in 2015. In January 2018, he joined Norwich City but was loaned back to Aberdeen until the end of the season.

McLean represented Scotland at the under-19 and under-21 levels before making his debut for the senior Scotland team in 2016, and has since gained over 60 caps for the side.

== Club career ==
=== Early life and career ===
McLean was born in Rutherglen and attended Cathkin High School in Cambuslang. He spent time with the youth setups of both Aberdeen and Rangers as a schoolboy. In 2008, he decided not to renew his Rangers contract and joined St Mirren.

=== Arbroath (loan) ===
McLean moved on loan from St Mirren to Second Division club Arbroath in December 2009. Arbroath signed McLean, along with Kilmarnock striker Daniel McKay, to cover for injuries. On 12 December, McLean made his debut for Arbroath in a 4–3 loss to Stirling Albion. Shortly after this match, Arbroath signed McLean's St Mirren teammate Kyle Faulds on loan. On 10 April, McLean scored his only goal for Arbroath, a penalty kick in a 4–2 loss against Stirling Albion. He made a total of 23 appearances during the second half of the 2009–10 season. Arbroath were relegated to the Third Division at the end of the season, after losing to Forfar Athletic in the relegation play-off. McLean has said that his loan spell at Arbroath helped him develop as a player and also to become more mature.

=== St Mirren ===
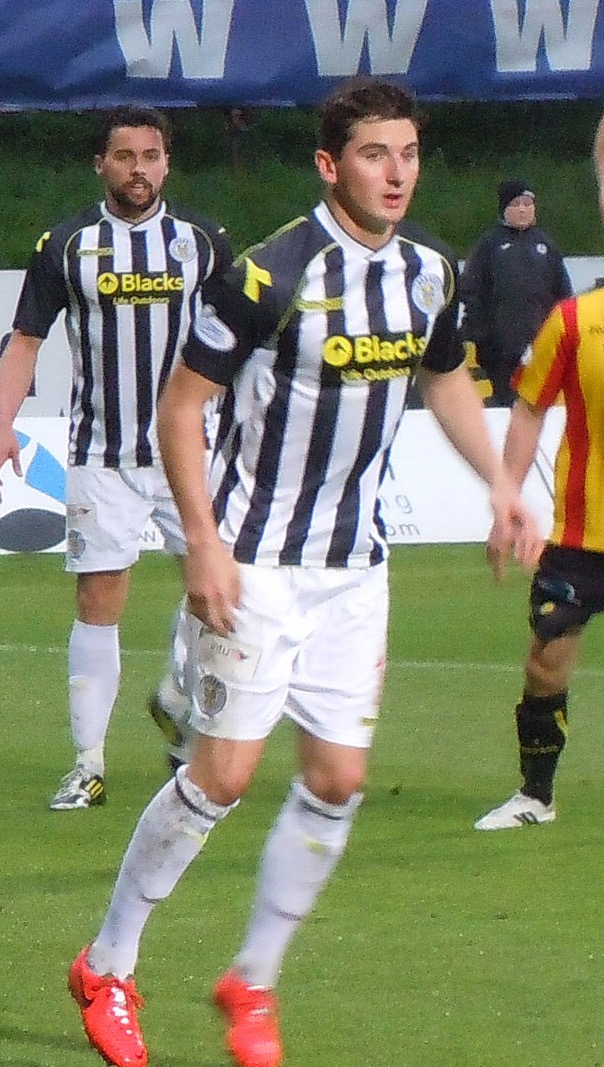
McLean playing for St Mirren in 2013

Eighteen-year-old McLean made his debut on 17 October 2010, coming on as a substitute in a 2–2 draw against Hamilton. St Mirren were 2–0 down when he came on and their manager, Danny Lennon, thought that they were going to lose anyway so he would bring a youngster on. However, The Herald noted that McLean's "drive and energy" lifted St Mirren and helped them to turn the game around and get a draw. Three days after his debut, McLean made his first start for St Mirren, in a 3–0 loss to Hearts. Later in the week he signed a three-year contract extension, tying him to the club until 2014. He then made his first home start, in a 1–0 loss to Celtic on 16 November. After this match he thanked his manager for having faith in him and also said that he was amazed by the fact that only six months before he was playing in the Second Division relegation play-off, but was now playing against some of the best players in the country. He went on to make a total of 23 appearances during the 2010–11 season.

Sky Sports said that during the 2011–12 season McLean had begun to emerge as one of the top young talents in the SPL. His first game of the season was on 6 August, in a 1–1 draw against Dundee United, where he came on as an 80th-minute substitute. His first start came a week later in a 1–0 loss to Motherwell. McLean then played regularly in the first team over the next few months and was in excellent form. He scored his first senior goal in a 1–0 win over St Johnstone on 29 October and was rewarded with the SPL Young Player of the Month award for October 2011. After this, teammate Gary Teale said that he thought McLean was very similar to former Rangers and Scotland captain Barry Ferguson, and that he thought McLean would have a brilliant future in the game. In the weeks leading up to his award, McLean had been watched by English Championship clubs Burnley and Crystal Palace, with Celtic also reportedly interested in him. Lennon encouraged interest from other clubs, saying that he took it as a compliment to McLean's development. But he also said that he would not consider selling McLean in the near future and expressed his delight at the fact that he had already signed McLean on a long-term contract. On 19 November, McLean scored his second goal for St Mirren, in a 2–1 win over Dunfermline Athletic. He then scored St Mirren's first goal, on 10 December, as they came from behind to secure a 2–2 draw against Aberdeen. McLean was one of the four players nominated for the SPL young Player of the Year Award. In January 2014 it was announced that McLean would be out-of-action for 6 weeks following knee surgery.

On 2 July 2014 it was announced that McLean had a signed a two-year contract extension with the club, following much speculation that he would leave the club in the summer.

=== Aberdeen ===
McLean signed a three-and-a-half-year contract with Aberdeen on 2 February 2015, for a reported transfer fee of around £300,000. He made his debut for the club the following weekend in a league game against Ross County, which Aberdeen won 4–0. On 16 July 2015, McLean scored his first goal for Aberdeen in a 3–0 win away to HNK Rijeka in the second qualifying round first leg of the Europa League. McLean scored his first league goal for Aberdeen in a 1–0 win over Dundee United on the opening day of the 2015–16 season.

In November 2017, McLean confirmed that he would not be renewing his Aberdeen contract when it expired the following summer.

Having helped the team to finish runners-up in the 2017–18 Scottish Premiership – as in each of his other three campaigns with the club – McLean finally departed Aberdeen after making 158 appearances and scoring 25 goals during his spell at Pittodrie (including the loan back after signing for Norwich).

=== Norwich City ===
McLean was sold in January 2018 to Norwich City, who loaned him back to Aberdeen for the rest of the season.

Having missed a portion of his first season in English football with an ankle ligament injury, in December 2018 he commented that he was determined to prove he was good enough. He returned to the Canaries team to help the club gain promotion to the Premier League as winners of the 2018–19 EFL Championship, with his enthusiastic title celebrations (addressing the crowd of supporters as the 'Mayor of Norwich' with a ceremonial hat and bottle of fortified wine) receiving media attention. In the 2019 close season, he signed an improved contract.

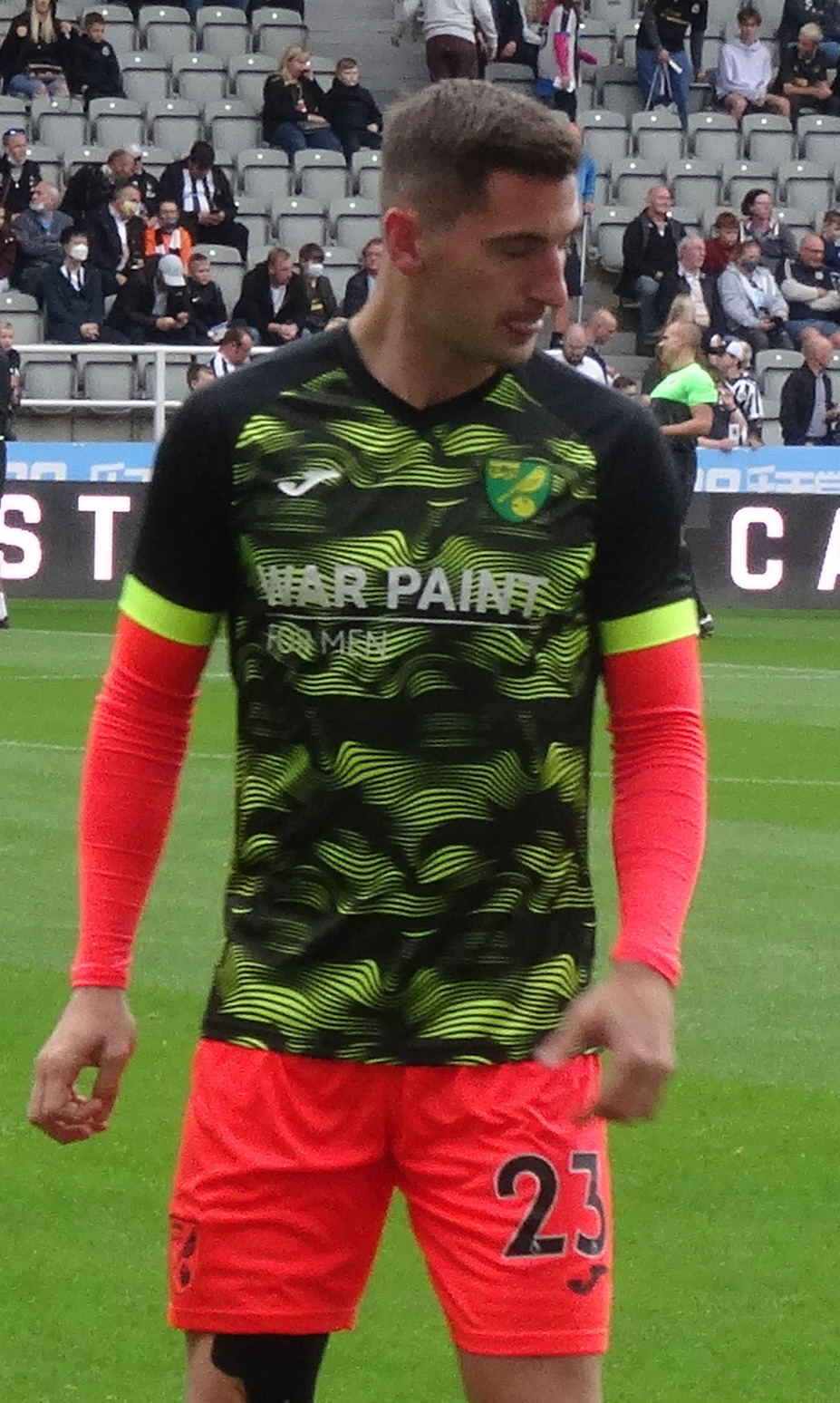
McLean warming up for Norwich City in 2021

In September 2023, McLean signed a contract extension, keeping him at the club until the end of the 2025–26 season, with an option for a further one-year extension. In November 2023, he defended manager David Wagner after the team took one point from a possible 18. In January 2024 he said he wanted to improve his goal record. In February 2024 he was credited with helping the club's turn around in results.

He was named Norwich's Player of the Season for the 2023–24 season.

During the 2024–25 season he was sent off in the 3–3 draw with Middlesbrough for a foul on Hayden Hackney on 27 October 2024, with his suspension being increased to four games after it was determined he had abused a match official in the aftermath. Later in the season he received further four game suspension after the FA took retrospective action when he was deemed to have struck Kieran Morgan in the face during a game against Queens Park Rangers.

McLean had captained Norwich in the majority of games since the previous season with Grant Hanley absent from the side, and remained in the role on a permanent basis after Hanley left the club in January 2025. On 11 February, McLean was withdrawn from Norwich's starting line-up against Preston North End and replaced with Jacob Wright, with manager Johannes Hoff Thorup explaining that he had experienced difficulty breathing. He was later diagnosed with a chest infection which caused him to miss four games. During the 2024–25 season, he played in 34 of the 46 league games, plus three cup games.

At the end of Norwich City's 2025–26 season, McLean was named the supporters player of the season, marking the second time that he had won the award. On 27 May 2026 the club announced he had signed a new two-year deal.

== International career ==
McLean received his first call-up for Scotland under-19 squad in October 2010, coming on as a 58th-minute substitute in a 4–2 victory over Norway.

In March 2011, he was called up to the under-21 team. Making his debut, again from the bench, as Scotland beat Belgium 1–0. He was not selected for the Scotland under-21 team to play in a 2013 European Under-21 Football Championship qualification match against the Netherlands on 14 November 2011. St Mirren manager Danny Lennon expressed his surprise at McLean being left out of the squad. The Herald said that this was understandable given that he was "among the on-form midfielders of his age group" at the time.

McLean received his first call-up to the senior Scotland squad in March 2016 for a friendly match against Czech Republic, making his debut by playing 57 minutes. He was called up again in October 2017 for a friendly match against the Netherlands. McLean scored his first Scotland goal in March 2019 in a 2–0 away win against San Marino.

McLean scored the winning penalties as Scotland beat Israel and Serbia in shootouts to secure qualification for UEFA Euro 2020 via playoffs. McLean missed the tournament itself due to a knee ligament injury suffered in the last game of the 2020–21 EFL Championship season.

In June 2023, McLean scored the winning goal in a UEFA Euro 2024 qualifying match against Norway.

On 7 June 2024, McLean was named in Scotland's squad for the UEFA Euro 2024 finals in Germany. A week later, he appeared as a 67th minute substitute for John McGinn in the opening match of the tournament, where Scotland lost 5–1 to hosts Germany. He went on to appear as a substitute against both Switzerland and Hungary as Scotland finished bottom of Group A with one point from three matches. He later said that his national teammates were "desperate" to improve results.

On 23 March 2025, McLean won his 50th cap for Scotland in a 3–0 loss to Greece in the second leg of the 2024–25 UEFA Nations League play-offs. Later that year, on 18 November, he scored a late stoppage-time goal from the halfway line in a 4–2 victory over Denmark in the final match of Group C, clinching his nation's qualification for the 2026 FIFA World Cup for the first time since 1998.

On 19 May 2026, McLean was selected in the 26-man squad for the 2026 FIFA World Cup.

== Inspiration for a poem by Scotland's makar ==
McLean's goal against Denmark has been the inspiration for a poem in Gaelic and English by Scotland's makar, (national poet) Pàdraig MacAoidh. In an interview with the Herald, MacAoidh stated "“It was probably when that ball was in the air waiting to bounce over Schmeichel that I realised I might have to write about it.". He then quoted a line in his poem describing the goal " ‘watching a ball tumble in its everyday, humdrum perfect parabola, to fall plump as a rainbow back to earth’.”

== Style of play ==
McLean's favoured position is as a central midfielder, but he can also play as a left midfielder. He has said that he favours playing in the centre because he can get more of the ball and influence play more than when he is on the left. He is a naturally attacking player and when playing in the centre he makes runs to and beyond the striker which adds an extra dimension to his team's play.

Former Scotland international Gary Teale, who was McLean's teammate at St Mirren, has compared him to Barry Ferguson. Teale said that McLean had shown incredible maturity at such a young age and that he could see McLean's talent from their first training session together. McLean has an excellent first touch and is also very composed and assured on the ball. McLean also has very high energy, work rate and athleticism, which enable him to make many attacking runs. McLean's manager at St Mirren, Danny Lennon, said that he thought McLean was an excellent passer and that he could "open a tin of beans" with his left foot and was also decent with his right. Lennon also said that McLean was a rare type of Scottish player because he was always looking for a 'slide-rule' pass and he was actually capable of delivering them.

== Career statistics ==
=== Club ===
As of match played 21 November 2026

Appearances and goals by club, season and competition
Club	Season	League			National cup (Note: Includes Scottish Cup and FA Cup)		League cup (Note: Includes Scottish League Cup and EFL Cup)		Other		Total	
Club	Season	Division	Apps	Goals	Apps	Goals	Apps	Goals	Apps	Goals	Apps	Goals
St Mirren	2009–10	Scottish Premier League	0	0	0	0	0	0	–		0	0
St Mirren	2010–11	Scottish Premier League	19	0	4	0	0	0	–		23	0
St Mirren	2011–12	Scottish Premier League	28	4	3	0	2	0	–		33	4
St Mirren	2012–13	Scottish Premier League	29	3	1	1	3	2	–		33	6
St Mirren	2013–14	Scottish Premiership	30	6	3	1	1	0	–		34	7
St Mirren	2014–15	Scottish Premiership	25	7	2	0	2	0	–		29	7
St Mirren	Total		131	20	13	2	8	2	–		152	24
Arbroath (loan)	2009–10	Scottish Second Division	20	1	0	0	0	0	3 (Note: Appearances in Scottish Second Division play-offs)	0	23	1
Aberdeen	2014–15	Scottish Premiership	13	0	0	0	0	0	–		13	0
Aberdeen	2015–16	Scottish Premiership	38	6	1	0	1	0	5 (Note: Appearances in UEFA Europa League)	3	45	9
Aberdeen	2016–17	Scottish Premiership	38	4	5	0	4	1	6	0	53	5
Aberdeen	2017–18	Scottish Premiership	22	3	1	0	2	1	4	0	29	4
Aberdeen	Total		111	13	7	0	7	2	15	3	140	18
Norwich City	2017–18	Championship	0	0	0	0	0	0	–		0	0
Norwich City	2018–19	Championship	20	3	1	0	1	0	–		22	3
Norwich City	2019–20	Premier League	37	1	4	0	1	0	–		42	1
Norwich City	2020–21	Championship	38	2	1	0	0	0	–		39	2
Norwich City	2021–22	Premier League	31	1	3	1	1	1	–		35	3
Norwich City	2022–23	Championship	35	1	1	0	2	0	–		38	1
Norwich City	2023–24	Championship	46	1	2	1	2	0	2 (Note: Appearances in Championship play-offs)	0	52	2
Norwich City	2024–25	Championship	34	0	1	0	2	0	–		37	0
Norwich City	2025–26	Championship	42	3	2	0	1	0	–		45	3
Norwich City	2026–27	Championship	11	0	0	0	1	0	–		12	0
Norwich City	Total		294	12	15	2	11	1	2	0	322	15
Aberdeen (loan)	2017–18	Scottish Premiership	15	5	3	2	0	0	–		18	7
Career total			571	51	38	6	26	5	20	3	655	65

=== International ===
As of match played 24 June 2026

Appearances and goals by national team and year
National team	Year	Apps	Goals
Scotland	2016	1	0
Scotland	2017	1	0
Scotland	2018	3	0
Scotland	2019	5	1
Scotland	2020	7	0
Scotland	2021	7	0
Scotland	2022	4	0
Scotland	2023	8	1
Scotland	2024	12	0
Scotland	2025	6	1
Scotland	2026	7	0
Total		61	3

Scores and results list Scotland's goal tally first.

List of international goals scored by Kenny McLean
No.	Date	Venue	Opponent	Score	Result	Competition
1.	24 March 2019	San Marino Stadium, Serravalle, San Marino	San Marino	1–0	2–0	UEFA Euro 2020 qualifying
2.	17 June 2023	Ullevaal Stadion, Oslo, Norway	Norway	2–1	2–1	UEFA Euro 2024 qualifying
3.	18 November 2025	Hampden Park, Glasgow, Scotland	Denmark	4–2	4–2	2026 FIFA World Cup qualification

== Honours ==
St Mirren

- Scottish League Cup: 2012–13

Aberdeen

- Scottish Cup runner-up: 2016–17
- Scottish League Cup runner-up: 2016–17

Norwich City

- EFL Championship: 2018–19, 2020–21

Individual

- Norwich City Player of the Season: 2023–24, 2025–26
