= Jim Goodwin =

Irish football coach and former player (born 1981)

- Goodwin as Dundee United manager in 2026

Personal information
- Full name: James Michael Goodwin
- Date of birth: 20 November 1981 (age 45)
- Place of birth: Waterford, Ireland
- Positions: Defensive midfielder; centre-back

Team information
- Current team: Dundee United (manager)

Youth career
- 1997–2000: Celtic

Senior career*
Years	Team	Apps	(Gls)
2000–2002	Celtic	1	(0)
2002–2005	Stockport County	103	(7)
2005–2008	Scunthorpe United	84	(6)
2008–2010	Huddersfield Town	42	(1)
2010	→ Oldham Athletic (loan)	8	(0)
2010–2011	Hamilton Academical	14	(0)
2011–2016	St Mirren	153	(3)
2016–2019	Alloa Athletic	17	(1)
Total		422	(18)

International career
- Republic of Ireland U17
2001–2003	Republic of Ireland U21	6	(1)
2002	Republic of Ireland	1	(0)
2007	Republic of Ireland B	1	(0)

Managerial career
- 2016–2019: Alloa Athletic
- 2019–2022: St Mirren
- 2022–2023: Aberdeen
- 2023–: Dundee United
Medal record
Men's football
Representing Republic of Ireland
UEFA Euro U-16
Winner	1998 Scotland
- * Club domestic league appearances and goals

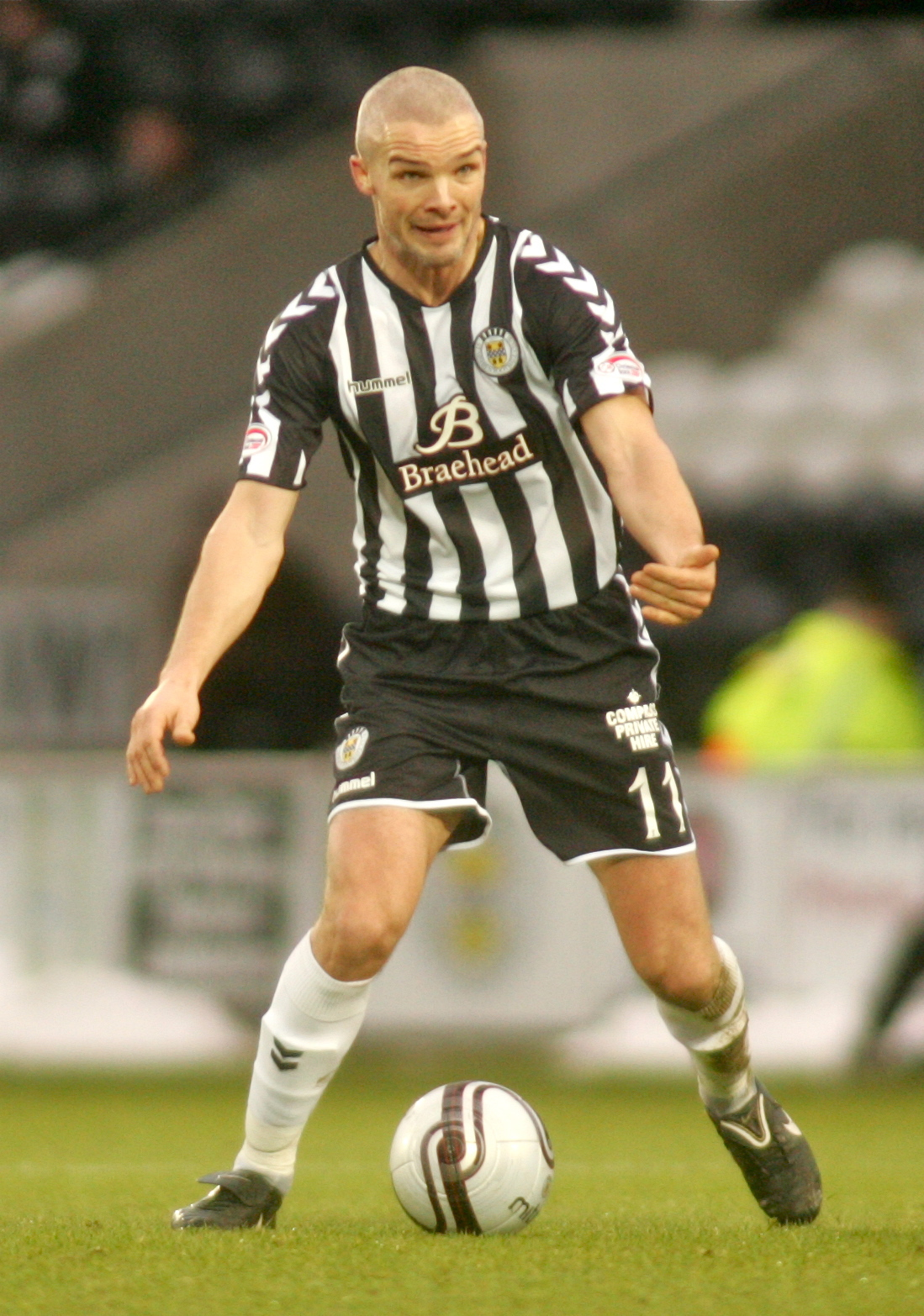
Goodwin playing for St Mirren

James Michael Goodwin (born 20 November 1981) is an Irish football manager and former player who is the manager of Dundee United.

Goodwin had a playing career from 2000 to 2019 in Scotland and England, playing in a defensive role with Celtic, Stockport County, Scunthorpe United, Huddersfield Town, Hamilton Academical, St Mirren and Alloa Athletic. He also had a loan spell at Oldham Athletic.

Goodwin also played at various levels with Ireland. He played once for the full Republic of Ireland national team, in 2002, and was capped once by the Republic of Ireland B team, in 2007.

Goodwin began his coaching career at St.Mirren as a player-coach. After a stint as assistant manager at Alloa Athletic, he became the club's manager and helped them win a promotion. He returned to St Mirren in June 2019 as manager. In February 2022 he left St Mirren to take over as manager of Aberdeen, but was sacked 11 months later. In March 2023, Goodwin was appointed manager of Dundee United who were relegated at the end of that season, with his team achieving instant promotion in the following season.

== Playing career ==
=== Early career ===
Born in Tramore, he began his professional career with Scottish club Celtic where he made one appearance for the club in 2000 before moving to Stockport County in 2002. Goodwin made his debut for Stockport in their 1–1 draw at home to Queens Park Rangers, he made 33 appearances scoring 3 goals during his first season at the club. His first game of the 2003–04 season came in their 1–0 loss away at Wycombe Wanderers and his first goal of the season came in Stockport's 2–2 draw at home to Notts County in October 2003. Goodwin made 34 appearances, scoring 4 goals throughout the 2003–04 season. Goodwin left Stockport in 2005 after making 103 appearances and scoring seven goals from 2002 to 2005.

=== Scunthorpe United ===
Goodwin was signed by Scunthorpe United in 2005, where he made 84 appearances scoring six goals between 2005 and 2008. He was injured in a pre-season friendly shortly after signing, and then suffered a further setback with the injury. In an eventful debut he scored his first goal for the club in their 3–1 home defeat to Brentford on 26 November 2005, and was also sent off. He was part of the Scunthorpe side that won League One in the 2006–07 season. Goodwin was released by Scunthorpe on 8 May 2008, along with two other players after the club were relegated from The Championship after one season in the division. His last game being the victory at home against Cardiff City, when he was substituted at half-time. He was also named as Scunthorpe player of the year 2007 and won goal of the season 2007.

=== Huddersfield Town ===
On 5 June 2008, he signed a three-year deal at Huddersfield Town. He along with five other players made his debut in the 1–1 draw against Stockport County at the Galpharm Stadium on 9 August 2008. On 28 December, he scored his first goal for Huddersfield when he scored to give Town the lead against ex-club Scunthorpe in a 2–0 victory.

After missing the beginning of the 2009–10 season due to a knee operation, he made his first appearances of the season coming on as a 79th-minute substitute in a 2–1 home win over Yeovil Town on 29 August 2009. His first start came in the next match, a Football League Trophy first-round tie at Rotherham United on 1 September, which Town won 2–1. He made his first and only League start for Huddersfield in the 2009–10 season, in a 2–1 loss away at Walsall. Goodwin made seven appearances for the Terriers during the 2009–10 season, before moving on loan to Oldham Athletic until the end of the season. Goodwin was released from his contract on 31 August 2010.

==== Oldham Athletic (loan) ====
On 1 January 2010, he joined fellow League One side Oldham on an emergency month's loan. He made his debut in the 2–1 defeat by Hartlepool United the following day. The loan was then extended until the end of the 2009–10 season. Goodwin made eight appearances in his time at the club.

=== Hamilton Academical ===
After leaving Huddersfield, he joined Hamilton Academical on 6 September 2010. His debut for the club came on 11 September 2010, in a 2–1 home defeat against Rangers.

=== St Mirren ===
Goodwin signed for St Mirren after his contract at Hamilton expired in January 2011. He made his debut at St Mirren Park on 8 January, when he started against Peterhead in a Scottish Cup tie. After the release of defender John Potter, Goodwin was appointed captain of the club for the 2011–12 season.

Goodwin quickly became a fans' favourite due to his tough tackling, leadership qualities, diving headers and the quality of his long-range shooting. He often switched the play and moved out wide to deliver early crosses to teammate Steven Thompson. He usually sat in front of the back four in the team's 4–3–3 formation as a holding midfielder to allow the other midfielders to get forward. However, in the 2012–2013 campaign, Goodwin played most games at centre half, forming a partnership with Marc McAusland. The same pair started the 2013–14 season playing together also.

Goodwin netted his first goal for the club on 20 September 2011, against St Johnstone to send St Mirren into the quarter-finals of the Scottish League Cup, rifling a shot into the top corner from the edge of the box in front of the away fans.

The Irishman's second goal for the Paisley club, and second of the 2011–12 season, came in an away league fixture against Motherwell on 17 December 2011. Goodwin scored a "superb strike from 35 yards out" past Well keeper Darren Randolph to level the score at 1–1. Goodwin described the goal as the "best one of my career," and won the Man of the Match award for his strong performance. Following the match, Goodwin was offered a two-match ban by the Scottish Football Association's compliance offer, after an incident with Motherwell's Steve Jennings, who was also offered the same punishment. On 20 December 2011, Goodwin accepted the suspension.

Goodwin became a huge favourite within the St Mirren support for his 'no-nonsense' approach to players, matches and referees. Many fans likened the midfielder to club legend Billy Abercromby, who also enjoyed a similar style.

Goodwin signed a new contract with St Mirren in January 2012, after Hibernian had expressed interest in signing him. He was suspended for the first two games of the 2012–13 Scottish Premier League season. Goodwin scored yet another goal from distance in a home SPL tie against Hearts, driving the ball past opposing keeper Jamie MacDonald from 40 yards with a terrific strike. On 17 March 2013, Goodwin captained St Mirren as they won the 2013 Scottish League Cup Final with a 3–2 victory against Hearts, the club's first major cup trophy in 26 years After the match, Goodwin told BBC Scotland he was overjoyed at winning the League Cup and says "You watch so many legends going up those [Hampden] steps over the years, you just hope, as a boy, that you're going to get the opportunity to do it, I've fulfilled one of my dreams today. It's such a proud moment for me. Loads of my family are over from Ireland. It's a St Patrick's Day that will live with me forever.".

On 30 December 2013, Goodwin was given a two-match suspension after St Mirren accepted the offer of the ban from the SFA's compliance officer, following a clash with Stuart Armstrong of Dundee United in a match four days earlier.

On 13 May 2014, Goodwin signed a new two-year contract with the club, taking on a player-coach role to assist newly appointed St Mirren manager Tommy Craig. After Tommy Craig left Saints in December 2014, it was confirmed that Goodwin would return to playing duties only. The midfielder had taken on a player-coach role in the summer, but it is thought that ill-discipline while playing had cost him this role.

He was released by St Mirren at the end of the 2015–16 season.

=== Alloa Athletic ===
On 13 June 2016, Goodwin signed for Scottish League One side Alloa Athletic. He scored his first goal for the club in a 2–2 draw with Stenhousemuir on 24 September 2016, but he was later sent off in the same game. Goodwin became player-manager after the departure of Jack Ross, and considered ending his playing career shortly afterwards. Goodwin made no further playing appearances after January that season, and then returned to play three more games in September at the start of the following season.

=== International career ===
Goodwin has represented the Republic of Ireland at international level being capped at Under-16, Under 21, B level and at full international level. Goodwin was at the heart of the defence for the Republic of Ireland under-16 along with fellow Waterford man John O'Shea, as they won the 1998 UEFA European Under-16 Football Championship in Perth, Scotland.

Goodwin was captain of the Republic of Ireland under-21 before making the step up to full international level, earning one cap for Republic of Ireland national football team coming on as a substitute for Robbie Keane in a match against Finland in Helsinki in August 2002. Goodwin was also capped by Republic of Ireland B in 2007 against Scotland B, but was sent-off during the match.

== Coaching career ==
=== Alloa Athletic ===
Goodwin was appointed player-manager in October 2016, after Jack Ross had moved to St Mirren. Due to Alloa's status as a semi-professional club, Goodwin also worked at a car leasing company, a construction recruitment firm, ran his own courier company and had a job as a Cadbury chocolate salesman. He led the club to promotion to the Scottish Championship in May 2018 via the play-offs. Under Goodwin's management the club avoided relegation from the Championship in 2018–19, despite having part-time players and staff.

=== St Mirren ===
Goodwin returned to St Mirren in June 2019 as manager, succeeding Oran Kearney. A 1–0 win against last-placed Hearts in the last league match before competitive football was stopped by the COVID-19 pandemic meant that St Mirren finished ninth in the 2019–20 Scottish Premiership. Goodwin signed a new contract with St Mirren in February 2021, with the team sitting in 7th place in the 2020–21 Scottish Premiership. In April 2021 he was issued with a 3 match suspension for criticising a refereeing decision after a draw with Hamilton Academical. Goodwin was also sent off after the match. In February 2022 Aberdeen met the terms of a release clause in Goodwin's contract allowing him to end his time at St Mirren. At the time of his departure, the club were sixth in the 2021–22 Scottish Premiership and had reached the quarter finals of the Scottish Cup.

=== Aberdeen ===
On 19 February 2022, Goodwin was appointed manager of Aberdeen on a two-and-a-half-year contract following the sacking of Stephen Glass. Aberdeen had reportedly paid £250,000 compensation to end his contract with St Mirren. At the time of joining, the club were seventh in the league and had been knocked out of the Scottish Cup, League Cup and UEFA Conference League. Having won only two of Goodwin's first twelve league games as manager, Aberdeen finished the 2021–22 Premiership season in tenth place, their lowest position in eighteen years. Goodwin made substantial changes to the squad with 26 players joining or leaving Aberdeen before the start of the 2022–23 season. In October 2022 Goodwin was given an eight-match touchline ban for remarks made about Hibernian player Ryan Porteous, who had won a controversial penalty against Aberdeen the previous month. The ban was reduced to five games following an appeal.

In January 2023, Goodwin came under pressure during a run of results which included a 5–0 league defeat by third-placed Hearts, followed by a 1–0 Scottish Cup loss to Darvel. The defeat by the West of Scotland Football League (sixth tier) team was described as Aberdeen's worst result in their 120-year history. Club chairman Dave Cormack subsequently released a statement saying: "Jim has been left in no doubt that the Board and the fans are seeking an immediate response from him and the players." Aberdeen lost their next game 6–0 away to Hibernian in the league in a game termed "El Sackio" (a play on words of El Clásico) due to the precarious position of both managers; this was Aberdeen's largest magnitude of defeat to Hibernian in their history. Goodwin was sacked as Aberdeen manager after the match.

=== Dundee United ===
In March 2023 Goodwin was appointed manager of Dundee United on a short-term contract until the end of the 2022–23 Scottish Premiership. Goodwin was the club's third manager that season following Jack Ross and Liam Fox. At the time of Goodwin's appointment, the team were four points adrift at the bottom of the league with twelve games remaining. Goodwin stated that his aim for the remainder of the season was to maintain the club's place in the Premiership. Three wins in a row during April lifted the team from the foot of the league table, but five consecutive defeats in May left the club in last place and relegated to the Scottish Championship. Goodwin signed a two-year contract with United on 27 May, on the eve of United's last match of the Premiership season.

During the 2023/24 SPFL Championship season, Jim Goodwin lead Dundee United to the league title amassing 75 points, the most points to win the league since St Mirren in the 2017/18 season & also the most points in a single Dundee United season. Goodwin won SPFL Championship Manager of the Month on 3 occasions in the year in the months September, October & April and ultimately won the SPFL Championship Manager of the year.

Goodwin oversaw a squad overhaul to start the 2024/25 SPFL Premiership season with 15 players departing after the championship success and a total of 13 players joining the revamped squad. Goodwin also changed systems to a preferred 3-4-3 for the upcoming season stating "That'll give us the best chance to win games. We will be flexible, we'll adapt and, by the time we get to the competitive games" After a fine start to the 2024/25 season Goodwin had his Dundee United team sitting 3rd in the league and in the quarter finals of the Premier Sports Cup by the time of the first international break of the season. In November 2024 it was announced that Goodwin had signed a contract extension with Dundee United which would see him remain manager until at least the summer of 2026.

== Career statistics ==
=== Club ===
Appearances and goals by club, season and competition
Club	Season	League			National Cup		League Cup		Other		Total	
Club	Season	Division	Apps	Goals	Apps	Goals	Apps	Goals	Apps	Goals	Apps	Goals
Celtic	1999–2000	Scottish Premier League	1	0	0	0	0	0	0	0	1	0
Stockport County	2002–03	Second Division	33	3	2	0	1	0	2 (Note: Appearances in the Football League Trophy)	0	38	3
Stockport County	2003–04	Second Division	34	4	1	1	1	0	3	1	39	6
Stockport County	2004–05	League One	36	0	3	0	1	0	2	0	42	0
Stockport County	Total		103	7	6	1	3	0	7	1	119	9
Scunthorpe United	2005–06	League One	13	2	1	0	0	0	2	0	16	2
Scunthorpe United	2006–07	League One	31	1	2	0	0	0	2	1	35	2
Scunthorpe United	2007–08	Championship	40	3	0	0	1	0	—		41	3
Scunthorpe United	Total		84	6	3	0	1	0	4	1	92	7
Huddersfield Town	2008–09	League One	37	1	1	0	2	0	0	0	40	1
Huddersfield Town	2009–10	League One	5	0	0	0	0	0	2	0	7	0
Huddersfield Town	Total		42	1	1	0	2	0	2	0	47	1
Oldham Athletic (loan)	2009–10	League One	8	0	0	0	0	0	0	0	8	0
Hamilton Academical	2010–11	Scottish Premier League	14	0	0	0	0	0	—		14	0
St Mirren	2010–11	Scottish Premier League	17	0	5	0	0	0	—		22	0
St Mirren	2011–12	Scottish Premier League	31	1	4	0	3	1	—		38	2
St Mirren	2012–13	Scottish Premier League	29	1	1	0	4	0	—		34	1
St Mirren	2013–14	Scottish Premiership	32	0	3	0	1	0	—		36	0
St Mirren	2014–15	Scottish Premiership	28	1	1	0	1	0	—		30	1
St Mirren	2015–16	Scottish Championship	16	0	0	0	1	0	3 (Note: Appearances in the Scottish Challenge Cup)	0	20	0
St Mirren	Total		153	3	14	0	10	1	3	0	180	4
Alloa Athletic	2016–17	Scottish League One	14	1	1	0	5	0	2	0	22	1
Alloa Athletic	2017–18	Scottish League One	3	0	0	0	0	0	0	0	3	0
Alloa Athletic	Total		17	1	1	0	5	0	2	0	25	1
Career total			422	18	25	1	21	1	18	2	486	22

=== Managerial record ===
As of match played 21 November 2026

Managerial record by team and tenure
Team	Nat	From	To	Record				
Team	Nat	From	To	G	W	D	L	Win %
Alloa Athletic	(Scotland)	11 October 2016	28 June 2019	129	51	33	45	39.53
St Mirren	(Scotland)	28 June 2019	19 February 2022	120	39	40	41	32.50
Aberdeen	(Scotland)	19 February 2022	28 January 2023	43	17	7	19	39.53
Dundee United	(Scotland)	1 March 2023	present	165	70	42	53	42.42
Career total				457	177	122	158	38.73

- St Mirren statistics include League Cup forfeit win against Dumbarton on 9 July 2021 (COVID-19 pandemic).

== Honours ==
=== Player ===
Scunthorpe United

- Football League One: 2006–07

St Mirren

- Scottish League Cup: 2012–13

Republic of Ireland

- UEFA European Under-17 Championship: 1998

=== Manager ===
Alloa Athletic

- Scottish Championship play-offs: 2017–18

Dundee United

- Scottish Championship: 2023–24
