= Thomas Reilly (footballer) =

Scottish footballer

Personal information
- Date of birth: 15 September 1994 (age 32)
- Place of birth: Irvine, Scotland
- Height: 1.67 m (5 ft 6 in)
- Position: Midfielder

Team information
- Current team: Gartcairn Juniors

Youth career
- St Mirren

Senior career*
Years	Team	Apps	(Gls)
2011–2015	St Mirren	41	(1)
2011–2012	→ Albion Rovers (loan)	5	(0)
2015–2018	Elgin City	98	(9)
2018–2019	Forfar Athletic	28	(0)
2019–2022	Kelty Hearts	18	(1)
2022–2023	Darvel		
2023–	Gartcairn Juniors		

International career
2009	Scotland U-15	2	(0)
2009	Scotland U-16	2	(0)
2010	Scotland U-17	6	(0)
2012	Scotland U-18	2	(0)
2012	Scotland U-19	4	(0)
- * Club domestic league appearances and goals as of 29 October 2022 (UTC)

Thomas Reilly (born 15 September 1994) is a Scottish professional footballer who plays as a midfielder or forward for West of Scotland League First Division Gartcairn Juniors. He has also played for St Mirren, Elgin City, Forfar Athletic and Kelty Hearts, as well as Albion Rovers on loan.

== Club career ==
=== St Mirren ===
Reilly was born in Irvine. A member of St Mirren's under-19 squad, in November 2011, Reilly was sent on loan to Albion Rovers to gain first team experience. On his return he made his Scottish Premier League debut as a substitute aged just 17 against Hearts at Tynecastle.

After limited chances in the Saints first team, Reilly did feature more in season 2014–15 – mainly as a substitute – but failed to win a new contract during pre-season in the summer of 2015, and as such was released by the club.

=== Albion Rovers (loan) ===
On 16 November 2011 he joined Scottish Second Division side Albion Rovers on a month loan deal. Reilly made his debut on 19 November as a substitute against Ross County in the Scottish Cup, with his league debut coming on 26 November against Stenhousemuir. After four appearances his loan was extended for another month. In all he made six appearances whilst on loan with his last appearance coming on 2 January against Airdrie United.

=== Elgin City ===
On 11 September 2015, Reilly signed for Scottish League Two club Elgin City. Reilly spent three seasons with Elgin before departing in May 2018.

=== Forfar Athletic ===
In May 2018, Reilly agreed to sign for Scottish League One side Forfar Athletic for the 2018–19 season.

=== International ===
Reilly has represented Scotland at under-15 and under-16 level during 2009. He made his under-17 debut on 3 August 2010 against Sweden as a substitute. In all he made six appearances for the under-17 team.

== Career statistics ==
As of match played 20 April 2019

Appearances and goals by club, season and competition
Club	Season	League			Scottish Cup		League Cup		Other		Total	
Club	Season	Division	Apps	Goals	Apps	Goals	Apps	Goals	Apps	Goals	Apps	Goals
St Mirren	2011–12	Scottish Premier League	4	0	0	0	0	0	0	0	4	0
St Mirren	2012–13	Scottish Premier League	9	1	1	0	0	0	0	0	10	1
St Mirren	2013–14	Scottish Premiership	8	0	2	0	0	0	0	0	10	0
St Mirren	2014–15	Scottish Premiership	20	0	2	0	1	0	0	0	23	0
St Mirren	St Mirren total		41	1	5	0	1	0	0	0	47	1
Albion Rovers (loan)	2011–12	Scottish Second Division	5	0	1	0	0	0	0	0	6	0
Elgin City	2015–16	Scottish League Two	30	2	2	0	0	0	3 (Note: One appearance in the Scottish Challenge Cup and two in the League Two play-offs)	0	35	2
Elgin City	2016–17	Scottish League Two	35	2	2	0	4	0	1 (Note: Appearances in the Scottish Challenge Cup)	0	42	2
Elgin City	2017–18	Scottish League Two	33	5	2	0	4	2	3	0	42	7
Elgin City	Elgin City total		98	9	5	0	8	2	7	0	119	11
Forfar Athletic	2018–19	Scottish League One	28	0	2	0	4	0	1	0	35	0
Career total			167	10	13	0	13	2	8	0	201	12

== Honours ==
Kelty Hearts

- Lowland League: 2019–20
