= Marc McAusland =

Scottish footballer

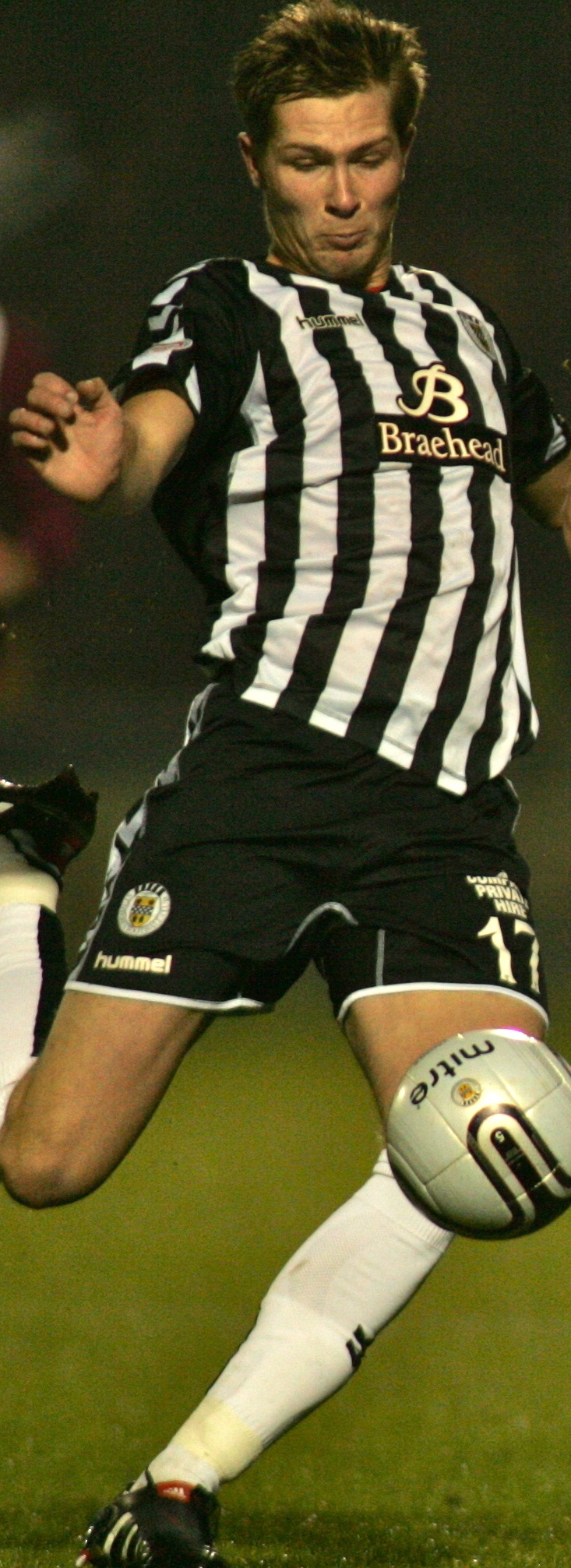
- McAusland playing for St Mirren

Personal information
- Date of birth: 13 August 1988 (age 38)
- Place of birth: Paisley, Scotland
- Position: Centre back

Team information
- Current team: Njarðvík
- Number: 13

Youth career
- 1999–2006: St Mirren

Senior career*
Years	Team	Apps	(Gls)
2006–2009	St Mirren	6	(0)
2006–2007	→ Stranraer (loan)	1	(0)
2009–2010	Queen of the South	25	(0)
2010–2015	St Mirren	154	(5)
2015–2016	Dunfermline Athletic	13	(0)
2016–2019	Keflavík	62	(2)
2019	Grindavík	22	(0)
2020–2024	Njarðvík	68	(11)
2024–2026	Íþróttafélag Reykjavíkur	44	(4)
2026–	Víðir	20	(4)
- * Club domestic league appearances and goals as of 30 September 2026 (UTC)

Marc McAusland (born 13 September 1988) is a Scottish footballer who plays as a defender for Icelandic club Njarðvík. McAusland has had two spells with his local side St Mirren, and has also played for Queen of the South, Dunfermline Athletic, Keflavík, Grindavík, as well as briefly being on loan with Stranraer.

== Career ==
=== St Mirren ===
McAusland, nicknamed 'Cheesy' started his career with St Mirren as a youth player. On 20 October 2006 he left on a one-month loan to Stranraer and made his senior debut against Greenock Morton the next day. McAusland made his "Saints" senior debut coming on as a substitute during a 2–0 win against Gretna on 29 March 2008. However, by the end of the 2008–09 season, he had only played a handful of games for the club.

=== Queen of the South ===
In the summer of 2009, McAusland moved to Dumfries club Queen of the South, in the Scottish First Division. Shortly after making his competitive debut for Queens he was named in the squad for the Scotland under 21 training camp scheduled for 9–11 August 2009.

=== Return to St Mirren ===
On 16 July 2010, McAusland returned to St Mirren, signing a three-year contract. On 13 March 2013, He extended his contract by a further two years, taking him up to the end of season 2014–15. McAusland was part of St Mirren's League Cup winning side in 2013. With his contract due to expire at the end of season 2014–15, he agreed to leave the club by mutual consent on 15 April 2015. He made 187 appearances for the club in total, over two spells.

=== Dunfermline Athletic ===
In September 2015 McAusland signed a one-year contract with Scottish League One side Dunfermline Athletic to bolster their squad, after injuries to defenders Callum Fordyce and Ryan Williamson left just four outright defenders fit. His first match for Dunfermline came in a one-all draw with Airdrieonians at the end of September. In total he made 15 appearances for the East End Park side before it was announced at the end of January 2016 that would be leaving the club, taking up an option in his contract which allowed him to be released early. His final match for the Pars was a league match against Cowdenbeath on 2 January 2016, in which he suffered a first-half injury and had to be replaced by Shaun Byrne.

=== Keflavík ===
In March 2016, McAusland signed a two-year deal with Icelandic side Keflavík. His first start for the side came a few days after signing, in an Icelandic League Cup match against Valur, with his first league start coming in a 1–1 draw with HK. During the 2016 season, McAusland played in all but one of his club's 22 league matches, helping Keflavík finish the league in third position. At their end of season closing reception, McAusland was voted Keflavík player of the year for the 2016 season, and in July 2017, his contract with the club was extended until the end of the 2019 season. After gaining promotion to the top tier, McAusland was included in the Inkasso-deildin team of the year, receiving 20 out of a possible 22 votes.

=== Grindavík ===
Following their relegation back to 1. deild, McAusland left Keflavík and signed for top-tier side Grindavík on a two-year deal. He left Grindavík after only one season.

== Career statistics ==
As of 26 September 2017

Club statistics
Club	Season	League			FA Cup		League Cup		Other		Total	
Club	Season	Division	Apps	Goals	Apps	Goals	Apps	Goals	Apps	Goals	Apps	Goals
St Mirren	2006–07	Scottish Premier League	0	0	0	0	0	0	0	0	0	0
St Mirren	2007–08	Scottish Premier League	1	0	0	0	0	0	0	0	1	0
St Mirren	2008–09	Scottish Premier League	5	0	0	0	0	0	0	0	5	0
St Mirren	Total		6	0	0	0	0	0	0	0	6	0
Stranraer (loan)	2006–07	Scottish Second Division	1	0	0	0	0	0	0	0	1	0
Queen of the South	2009–10	Scottish First Division	25	0	0	0	3	0	2	0	30	0
St Mirren	2010–11	Scottish Premier League	25	1	2	0	1	0	0	0	28	1
St Mirren	2011–12	Scottish Premier League	32	1	5	0	3	0	0	0	40	1
St Mirren	2012–13	Scottish Premier League	36	3	3	0	5	0	0	0	44	3
St Mirren	2013–14	Scottish Premiership	32	0	3	0	1	0	0	0	36	0
St Mirren	2014–15	Scottish Premiership	29	0	2	1	2	0	0	0	33	1
St Mirren	Total		154	5	15	1	12	0	0	0	181	6
Dunfermline Athletic	2015–16	Scottish League One	13	0	1	0	0	0	1	0	15	0
Keflavík	2016	1. deild karla	21	0	0	0	5	0	0	0	26	0
Keflavík	2017	1. deild karla	22	1	1	0	4	0	3	0	30	1
Keflavík	2018	Úrvalsdeild	19	1	0	0	0	0	0	0	19	1
Keflavík	Total		62	2	1	0	9	0	3	0	75	2
Grindavík	2019	Úrvalsdeild	22	0	0	0	0	0	0	0	22	0
Career total			230	6	17	1	27	0	6	0	302	7

== Honours ==
St Mirren

- Scottish League Cup (1): 2012–13
- Renfrewshire Cup : 2010, 2011, 2012, 2014

Dunfermline Athletic

- Scottish League One: 2015-16

Njardvik

- Iceland Division Two: 2022
