= James Marwood =

English footballer (born 1990)

Personal information
- Date of birth: 21 May 1990 (age 36)
- Place of birth: St Albans, England
- Position: Forward

Youth career
- Newcastle United

Senior career*
Years	Team	Apps	(Gls)
2009–2010	Blyth Spartans	4	(0)
2010	Team Northumbria	?	(?)
2010–2014	Gateshead	108	(38)
2011	→ FC Halifax Town (loan)	4	(2)
2014–2015	St Mirren	13	(0)
2015	Forest Green Rovers	16	(1)
2015–2016	Gateshead	3	(0)

International career^{‡}
2014	England C	3	(0)
- * Club domestic league appearances and goals as of 18:00, 8 May 2016 (UTC) ‡ National team caps and goals as of 17 August 2014 (UTC)

James Marwood (born 21 May 1990) is an English professional footballer who plays as a forward.

== Club career ==
Son of former Arsenal player Brian Marwood, James Marwood began his career as a youth team player with Newcastle United, before playing for English non-league sides Blyth Spartans and Team Northumbria. After joining Gateshead in 2010, he went on to make over 100 appearances for the club.

Having been utilised as a winger, Marwood moved to a striking position in season 2013–14, resulting in him being the club's top goalscorer.

=== St Mirren ===
On 26 June 2014, Marwood signed a one-year contract with St Mirren, with the option of a further year. He made his competitive debut for the club against Motherwell on 9 August 2014, in the Scottish Premiership. On 20 January 2015, he left St Mirren, with his contract being cancelled by mutual consent.

=== Forest Green Rovers ===
On 23 January 2015, it was announced that Marwood had signed for Conference Premier side Forest Green Rovers on an 18-month contract. He made his debut for the club on 31 January 2015 as a substitute in a 1–0 home win over Nuneaton Town. He scored his first goal for the club on 10 February 2015 in a 2–2 away draw against Alfreton Town. At the end of the 2014–15 season he helped Forest Green to the play-offs, only to be denied a second consecutive year of appearing in the final because of a semi-final defeat against Bristol Rovers.

=== Gateshead ===
On 24 June 2015, it was announced that Marwood had left Forest Green and re-signed for Gateshead. After missing the majority of the season with a career ending injury, Marwood retired that season.

== International career ==
Marwood earned a call up to the England C team in May 2014, alongside Gateshead teammate Marcus Maddison. He made his unofficial debut in a 2–2 draw with Sparta Prague B on 21 May 2014, before making his official debut three days later as a late substitute in a 1–0 defeat to Slovakia U23. He made his first international start on 28 May 2014 in a 4–2 defeat against Hungary U23.
