= Steven Thomson =

Scottish footballer

Personal information
- Full name: Steven John Thomson
- Date of birth: 23 January 1978 (age 48)
- Place of birth: Glasgow, Scotland
- Height: 5 ft 8 in (1.73 m)
- Position: Central midfielder

Youth career
- ?–1994: Crystal Palace

Senior career*
Years	Team	Apps	(Gls)
1994–2003	Crystal Palace	105	(1)
2003–2005	Peterborough United	66	(3)
2005–2008	Falkirk	72	(4)
2008	Brighton & Hove Albion	37	(0)
2009–2012	St Mirren	88	(10)
2012–2013	Dover Athletic	30	(3)
- * Club domestic league appearances and goals as of 1 July 2013

Steven John Thomson (born 23 January 1978) is a Scottish footballer who last played for Conference South side Dover Athletic.

== Club career ==
Thomson, a midfielder, previously played for English clubs Crystal Palace, Peterborough United, Brighton & Hove Albion and Scottish teams Falkirk, where he later became the club captain, and St. Mirren.

Thomson scored four goals during his spell at Palace. His first strike came against Leicester City in the League Cup in September 1999. The following season, Palace drew Leicester in the League Cup again, and this time Palace emerged victorious 3–0 against the Premier League side and League Cup holders. Thomson will be especially remembered by Crystal Palace fans for the stunning strike he scored in this game. Later that season he scored against Sunderland in the FA Cup before finally scoring his first and only league goal for Palace against Wolverhampton Wanderers in September 2002.

He joined Brighton & Hove Albion on 14 January 2008, making his debut in the 1–1 draw with Huddersfield Town. Thomson left Brighton a year later for 'family reasons' and moved back to Scotland, signing a two-and-a-half-year contract with SPL side St Mirren.

Thomson scored his first goal for St Mirren in the 2–0 away win against Motherwell in April 2009. Thomson scored two goals as St Mirren thrashed Celtic 4–0 on 24 March 2010.

At the close of the 2011–12 season Thomson and his family moved south and relocated to Essex to concentrate on a career away from full-time football. He linked up with former Brighton teammate Nicky Forster now manager of Dover Athletic during pre season and signed for the club. He left Dover after the 2012–13 season, having made 30 appearances. He subsequently joined Aylesbury United but did not make an appearance for the club.
