= 2012–13 East Stirlingshire F.C. season =

East Stirlingshire
2012–13 season
- Chairman: Tony Ford
- Manager: John Coughlin
- Stadium: Ochilview Park
- Third Division: Tenth place
- Challenge Cup: Quarter-final, lost to Cowdenbeath
- League Cup: First round, lost to Greenock Morton
- Scottish Cup: Third round, lost to Dumbarton
- Top goalscorer: League: Paul Quinn (11); All: Paul Quinn (11); Kevin Turner (11)
- Highest home attendance: 2,805 vs Rangers; Third Division; 27 April 2013
- Lowest home attendance: 192 vs Annan Athletic; Third Division; 22 December 2012

The 2012–13 season was East Stirlingshire's nineteenth consecutive season in the Scottish Third Division, having been relegated from the Scottish Second Division at the end of the 1993–94 season, following league reconstruction. East Stirlingshire also competed in the Challenge Cup, League Cup and the Scottish Cup.

== Summary ==
=== Season ===
East Stirlingshire finished tenth in the Scottish Third Division. They reached the Quarter-final of the Challenge Cup, the first round of the League Cup and the third round of the Scottish Cup.

== Results & fixtures ==
Win Draw Loss Postponed

=== Pre-season ===
30 June 2012 Friendly	East Stirlingshire	6 – 0	Easthouses Lily Miners Welfare	Closed door
	Quinn; Trialist; Greenhill; Turner	Report

7 July 2012 Friendly	Tynecastle	P – P	East Stirlingshire	Peffermill Playing Fields
14:30		Report

10 July 2012 Friendly	Tynecastle	2 – 4	East Stirlingshire	Forrester High School
		Report

13 July 2012 Friendly	Rothes	0 – 4	East Stirlingshire	Mackessack Park
19:45		Report	Own Goal; Quinn; McCaughie

14 July 2012 Friendly	Buckie Thistle	0 – 1	East Stirlingshire	Victoria Park
15:00		Report	Greenhill 85'

21 July 2012 Stirlingshire Cup round 1	Stenhousemuir	4 – 3	East Stirlingshire	Ochilview Park
15:00	Goal	East Stirling Report; Stenhousemuir Report	Turner; Maxwell; Quinn

=== Scottish Third Division ===
11 August 2012 Scottish Third Division	East Stirlingshire	0 – 2	Queen's Park	Ochilview Park
15:00		SFL Report	Shankland 48', 68'	Attendance: 430; Referee: Robertson

18 August 2012 Scottish Third Division	Rangers	5 – 1	East Stirlingshire	Ibrox Stadium
15:00	Little 15', 41', 74'; Francisco Sandaza 64'; McCulloch 90'	BBC Report; SFL Report	Paul Quinn 3' (pen.)	Attendance: 49,118; Referee: Clancy

25 August 2012 Scottish Third Division	East Stirlingshire	1 – 4	Elgin City	Ochilview Park
15:00	Turner 60'	SFL Report	Cameron 7'; Gunn 16'; O'Donoghue 39'; Wyness 59'	Attendance: 257; Referee: Robertson

1 September 2012 Scottish Third Division	Berwick Rangers	3 – 0	East Stirlingshire	Shielfield Park
15:00	Lavery 11'; McLaren 39'; Hoskins 80'	SFL Report		Attendance: 520; Referee: Dallas

15 September 2012 Scottish Third Division	East Stirlingshire	3 – 1	Stirling Albion	Ochilview Park
15:00	Maxwell 70'; Greenhill 81'; Shepherd 90'	SFL Report	Davidson (red card) 27'; Ferry 55'	Attendance: 487; Referee: Duncan

22 September 2012 Scottish Third Division	East Stirlingshire	3 – 0	Clyde	Ochilview Park
15:00	Turner 25'; Quinn 39'; Savage 93'	SFL Report		Attendance: 467; Referee: Aitken

6 October 2012 Scottish Third Division	Montrose	3 – 1	East Stirlingshire	Links Park
15:00	McIntosh 16'; Gray 21' (Penalty); Masson 33'	SFL Report	Hume 86'	Attendance: 244; Referee: Robertson

20 October 2012 Scottish Third Division	East Stirlingshire	2 – 1	Peterhead	Ochilview Park
15:00	Turner 32', 51'	SFL Report	McAllister 2' (pen.); Ross (red card) 58'	Attendance: 296; Referee: Ross

27 October 2012 Scottish Third Division	Annan Athletic	5 – 2	East Stirlingshire	Galabank
15:00	Hopkirk 42', 68', 90'; Love 45'; Chaplain 79' (pen.)	SFL Report	Quinn 60'; Miller (red card) 78'; Shepherd 90+2'	Attendance: 374; Referee: Cook

13 November 2012 Scottish Third Division	Queen's Park	1 – 2	East Stirlingshire	Hampden Park
19:30	Robertson 35'; Parry (red card) 71'	SFL Report	Greenhill 45'; Quinn 73' (pen.)	Attendance: 374; Referee: Dallas

17 November 2012 Scottish Third Division	East Stirlingshire	2 – 6	Rangers	Ochilview Park
12:45	Züfle (red card) 33'; Turner 41'; Quinn 58' (pen.)	SFL Report	McCulloch 12' (pen.), 82' (pen.); Little 39'; Wallace 49'; Kyle 63'; Naismith 71'	Attendance: 2,854; Referee: Salmond

25 November 2012 Scottish Third Division	East Stirlingshire	0 – 1	Berwick Rangers	Ochilview Park
15:00		SFL Report	Gray 22'; Notman (yellow card) 61' (red card)	Attendance: 327; Referee: Duncan

1 December 2012 Scottish Third Division	Stirling Albion	P – P	East Stirlingshire	Forthbank Stadium
15:00		BBC

8 December 2012 Scottish Third Division	East Stirlingshire	P – P	Montrose	Ochilview Park
15:00		BBC Report

11 December 2012 Scottish Third Division	Stirling Albion	P – P	East Stirlingshire	Forthbank Stadium
19:45		SFL Report
Note: Snow on Pitch

15 December 2012 Scottish Third Division	Clyde	2 – 1	East Stirlingshire	Broadwood Stadium
15:00	Scullion 20'; Watt 52'	SFL Report	Quinn 33' (Penalty)	Attendance: 428; Referee: Duncan

19 December 2012 Scottish Third Division	East Stirlingshire	2 – 2	Montrose	Ochilview Park
19:45	Turner 25', 45'	SFL Report	Young 13'; Wood 63'	Attendance: 211; Referee: Cook

22 December 2012 Scottish Third Division	East Stirlingshire	2 – 2	Annan Athletic	Ochilview Park
15:00	Stirling 37', 46' (Penalty)	SFL Report	Ramage 17'; Love 39'	Attendance: 192; Referee: Aitken

29 December 2012 Scottish Third Division	Peterhead	2 – 0	East Stirlingshire	Balmoor Stadium
15:00	Bavidge 6'; Cox 73'	SFL Report		Attendance: 446; Referee: Anderson

2 January 2013 Scottish Third Division	East Stirlingshire	1 – 1	Stirling Albion	Ochilview Park
15:00	Holt 45+2'	SFL Report	Thom 24'; Thom (red card) 38'	Attendance: 621; Referee: Graham

5 January 2013 Scottish Third Division	Berwick Rangers	2 – 0	East Stirlingshire	Shielfield Park
15:00	Lavery 10'; Easton 17'	SFL Report		Attendance: 473; Referee: Robertson

12 January 2013 Scottish Third Division	Elgin City	3 – 4	East Stirlingshire	Borough Briggs
15:00	Hunter 41' (Own goal); Leslie 45+1'; Gunn 65'; Leslie (yellow card) 90+2' (red card)	SFL Report	Hunter 7', 14'; Turner 44' (Penalty); Glasgow 57'	Attendance: 697; Referee: Salmond

19 January 2013 Scottish Third Division	East Stirlingshire	0 – 2	Queen's Park	Ochilview Park
15:00		SFL Report	Quinn 38'; Miller 71' (Own goal)	Attendance: 415; Referee: McKendrick

26 January 2013 Scottish Third Division	East Stirlingshire	P – P	Clyde	Ochilview Park
15:00		BBC Report
Note: Snow on pitch

2 February 2013 Scottish Third Division	Montrose	2 – 2	East Stirlingshire	Links Park
15:00	Boyle 37'; Gray 83'	SFL Report	Greenhill 18', 23'	Attendance: 327; Referee: Somers

5 February 2013 Scottish Third Division	Stirling Albion	P – P	East Stirlingshire	Forthbank Stadium
19:45		BBC Report
Note: Waterlogged pitch

9 February 2013 Scottish Third Division	East Stirlingshire	2 – 4	Peterhead	Ochilview Park
15:00	Jackson 88'; Glasgow 90+1'	SFL Report	McAllister 22', 25'; Rodgers 29'; McLaughlin 31'	Attendance: 278; Referee: Steven

12 February 2013 Scottish Third Division	Stirling Albion	1 – 1	East Stirlingshire	Forthbank Stadium
19:45	Weir 46'	SFL Report	Turner 55' (Penalty)	Attendance: 376; Referee: Newlands

16 February 2013 Scottish Third Division	Annan Athletic	1 – 2	East Stirlingshire	Galabank
15:00	Orsi 79'	SFL Report	Glasgow 49'; Holt 57'	Attendance: 349; Referee: Dallas

19 February 2013 Scottish Third Division	East Stirlingshire	3 – 0	Clyde	Ochilview Park
19:45	Herd 18'; Quinn 57' (Penalty); Stirling 63'	SFL Report		Attendance: 301; Referee: Hilland

23 February 2013 Scottish Third Division	East Stirlingshire	3 – 2	Elgin City	Ochilview Park
15:00	Quinn 40' (Penalty); Herd 46'; Maxwell 84'	SFL Report	McDonald 15'; Gunn 52'	Attendance: 277; Referee: Cook

2 March 2013 Scottish Third Division	Rangers	3 – 1	East Stirlingshire	Ibrox Stadium
12:00	Little 51', 63'; McCulloch 62'	SFL Report; Sky Report	Stirling 40'	Attendance: 44,534; Referee: Colvin

9 March 2013 Scottish Third Division	Stirling Albion	9 – 1	East Stirlingshire	Forthbank Stadium
15:00	Gillespie 28' (Own goal); White 38', 42' (Penalty), 70', 80' (Penalty); Ferry 53', 70'; Johnston 66'; Flood 72'	SFL Report	Jackson (red card) 40'; Wright 56'	Attendance: 563; Referee: Northcroft

16 March 2013 Scottish Third Division	East Stirlingshire	0 – 3	Berwick Rangers	Ochilview Park
15:00		SFL Report	Miller 23' (Own goal); Dalziel 38'; McDonald 72'	Attendance: 248; Referee: Robertson

23 March 2013 Scottish Third Division	East Stirlingshire	1 – 2	Montrose	Ochilview Park
15:00	Wright 43'	SFL Report	Watson 31', 90+2'; Lunan (yellow card) 93' (yellow-red card)	Attendance: 261; Referee: Anderson

30 March 2013 Scottish Third Division	Clyde	2 – 0	East Stirlingshire	Broadwood Stadium
15:00	Scullion 18'; Sweeney 90+2'	SFL Report		Attendance: 508; Referee: Walsh

6 April 2013 Scottish Third Division	Peterhead	6 – 0	East Stirlingshire	Balmoor
15:00	McAllister 3', 40'; Bavidge 16'; Redman 17', 57'; Cowie 39'	SFL Report		Attendance: 456; Referee: Newlands

13 April 2013 Scottish Third Division	East Stirlingshire	1 – 2	Annan Athletic	Ochilview Park
15:00	Wright 17'	SFL Report	Hopkirk 25'; Love 78'	Attendance: 288; Referee: Walsh

20 April 2013 Scottish Third Division	Queen's Park	5 – 1	East Stirlingshire	Hampden Park
15:00	Anderson 17'; Longworth 44', 53'; Burns 81'; Connolly 90+2'	SFL Report	Glasgow 37'	Attendance: 485; Referee: Dallas

27 April 2013 Scottish Third Division	East Stirlingshire	2 – 4	Rangers	Ochilview
	Quinn 22' (Penalty), 50'; Turner (red card) 30'	SFL Report	Crawford 6'; Templeton 45+3', 79'; Black 65'	Attendance: 2,805; Referee: Cook

4 May 2013 Scottish Third Division	Elgin City	3 – 2	East Stirlingshire	Borough Briggs
12:45	Duff 16'; Leslie 39'; McLean 89'	SFL Report	Glasgow 17'; Quinn 43'	Attendance: 786; Referee: Aitken

=== Scottish Challenge Cup ===
28 July 2012 Scottish Challenge Cup round 1	East Stirlingshire	3 – 1	Ayr United	Ochilview Park
15:00	Herd 28', 42'; Maxwell 86'	SFL Report	Shankland 51'	Attendance: 493; Referee: Cook

14 August 2012 Scottish Challenge Cup round 2	East Stirlingshire	3 – 0	Airdrie United	Ochilview Park
19:45	Maxwell 23'; Turner 36'; Herd 89'	SFL Report	McLaren (yellow card) 72'	Attendance: 383; Referee: Somers

9 September 2012 Scottish Challenge Cup QF	East Stirlingshire	1 – 2	Cowdenbeath	Ochilview Park
15:00	Kelly 24'	SFL Report	McKenzie 10'; Adamson 40'	Attendance: 414; Referee: Brines

=== Scottish League Cup ===
5 July 2012 Scottish League Cup round 1	East Stirlingshire	1 – 5	Greenock Morton	Ochilview Park
15:00	Herd 34'	SFL Report	McLaughlin 1'; Weatherson 11'; Stirling 37'; Wallace 67'; Tidser 86'	Attendance: 581; Referee: Beaton

=== Scottish Cup ===
29 September 2012 Scottish Cup round 2	Fraserburgh	1 – 2	East Stirlingshire	Bellslea Park
15:00	Johnstone 60', (yellow card) 90' (yellow-red card); Christie (red card) 90'	Sky Sports	Greenhill 13'; Turner 26'	Attendance: 389; Referee: Robertson

3 November 2012 Scottish Cup round 3	Dumbarton	4 – 1	East Stirlingshire	Dumbarton Football Stadium
15:00	Graham 13'; Lister 45'; Prunty 76'; Lithgow 89'	BBC Report	Greenhill 44'	Attendance: 446; Referee: Charleston

== Player statistics ==
=== Squad ===
Last updated 13 May 2013

No.	Pos	Nat	Player	Total		Third Division		Challenge Cup		League Cup		Scottish Cup	
No.	Pos	Nat	Player	Apps	Goals	Apps	Goals	Apps	Goals	Apps	Goals	Apps	Goals
	GK	(Scotland) SCO	Craig Gordon	2	0	2+0	0	0+0	0	0+0	0	0+0	0
	GK	(Scotland) SCO	Grant Hay	35	0	31+0	0	2+0	0	0+0	0	2+0	0
	GK	(Scotland) SCO	Ryan McWilliams	5	0	3+0	0	1+0	0	1+0	0	0+0	0
	DF	(Scotland) SCO	Corin Anderson	2	0	0+2	0	0+0	0	0+0	0	0+0	0
	DF	(Scotland) SCO	Raymond Buchanan	13	0	13+0	0	0+0	0	0+0	0	0+0	0
	DF	(Scotland) SCO	Michael Dunlop	1	0	1+0	0	0+0	0	0+0	0	0+0	0
	DF	(Scotland) SCO	Jamie Glasgow	22	5	11+10	5	0+1	0	0+0	0	0+0	0
	DF	(Scotland) SCO	Jack Hamilton	5	0	4+1	0	0+0	0	0+0	0	0+0	0
	DF	(Wales) WAL	Jordan Holt	9	2	9+0	2	0+0	0	0+0	0	0+0	0
	DF	(Scotland) SCO	Steven Jackson	39	1	32+1	1	3+0	0	1+0	0	2+0	0
	DF	(Scotland) SCO	Sean Kelly	12	1	8+1	0	1+0	1	0+0	0	2+0	0
	DF	(Scotland) SCO	Richard Miller	37	0	29+2	0	3+0	0	1+0	0	2+0	0
	DF	(Scotland) SCO	Chris Moffat	6	0	6+0	0	0+0	0	0+0	0	0+0	0
	DF	(Scotland) SCO	Steven Tart	1	0	0+0	0	0+0	0	0+0	0	0+1	0
	MF	(Scotland) SCO	Jamie Benton	7	0	0+5	0	0+1	0	0+1	0	0+0	0
	MF	(Scotland) SCO	Mark Begg	21	0	11+6	0	1+1	0	1+0	0	1+0	0
	MF	(Scotland) SCO	Rhys Devlin	10	0	6+0	0	3+0	0	1+0	0	0+0	0
	MF	(Scotland) SCO	Craig Donaldson	2	0	0+1	0	0+1	0	0+0	0	0+0	0
	MF	(Scotland) SCO	David Greenhill	40	6	30+4	4	3+0	0	1+0	0	2+0	2
	MF	(Scotland) SCO	Michael Herd	26	6	17+4	2	2+1	3	1+0	1	0+1	0
	MF	(Scotland) SCO	Craig Hume	13	1	9+0	1	2+0	0	1+0	0	1+0	0
	MF	(Scotland) SCO	Michael Hunter	37	2	26+6	2	3+0	0	1+0	0	1+0	0
	MF	(Scotland) SCO	Conor Kelly	7	0	0+7	0	0+0	0	0+0	0	0+0	0
	MF	(Scotland) SCO	Graeme MacGregor	6	0	6+0	0	0+0	0	0+0	0	0+0	0
	MF	(England) ENG	Scott Maxwell	39	4	31+2	2	3+0	2	1+0	0	2+0	0
	MF	(Scotland) SCO	Jamie McKernon	14	0	13+0	0	0+0	0	0+0	0	1+0	0
	MF	(Scotland) SCO	Craig Scott	0	0	0+0	0	0+0	0	0+0	0	0+0	0
	MF	(Scotland) SCO	Nathan Shepherd	22	2	12+5	2	3+0	0	1+0	0	1+0	0
	MF	(Scotland) SCO	Andy Stirling	20	4	20+0	4	0+0	0	0+0	0	0+0	0
	MF	(Germany) GER	Philipp Züfle	14	0	8+5	0	0+0	0	0+0	0	1+0	0
	FW	(Scotland) SCO	Kyle Gillespie	7	0	2+3	0	0+1	0	0+0	0	0+1	0
	FW	(Scotland) SCO	Alex Lurinsky	1	0	0+1	0	0+0	0	0+0	0	0+0	0
	FW	(Scotland) SCO	David McCaughie	2	0	0+2	0	0+0	0	0+0	0	0+0	0
	FW	(Scotland) SCO	Paul Quinn	28	11	20+5	11	1+0	0	0+0	0	2+0	0
	FW	(Scotland) SCO	Joseph Savage	2	1	0+2	1	0+0	0	0+0	0	0+0	0
	FW	(Scotland) SCO	Kevin Turner	33	11	27+1	9	2+0	1	0+1	0	2+0	1
	FW	(Scotland) SCO	Max Wright	16	3	9+7	3	0+0	0	0+0	0	0+0	0

=== Disciplinary record ===
Includes all competitive matches.

Last updated 13 May 2013

Nation	Position	Name	Third Division		Challenge Cup		League Cup		Scottish Cup		Total	
Nation	Position	Name	Yellow card	Red card	Yellow card	Red card	Yellow card	Red card	Yellow card	Red card	Yellow card	Red card
(Scotland)	GK	Craig Gordon	0	0	0	0	0	0	0	0	0	0
(Scotland)	GK	Grant Hay	0	0	0	0	0	0	0	0	0	0
(Scotland)	GK	Ryan McWilliams	0	0	0	0	0	0	0	0	0	0
(Scotland)	DF	Corin Anderson	0	0	0	0	0	0	0	0	0	0
(Scotland)	DF	Raymond Buchanan	3	0	0	0	0	0	0	0	3	0
(Scotland)	DF	Michael Dunlop	0	0	0	0	0	0	0	0	0	0
(Scotland)	DF	Jamie Glasgow	2	0	0	0	0	0	0	0	2	0
(Scotland)	DF	Jack Hamilton	0	0	0	0	0	0	0	0	0	0
(Wales)	DF	Jordan Holt	3	0	0	0	0	0	0	0	3	0
(Scotland)	DF	Steven Jackson	8	1	1	0	0	0	1	0	10	1
(Scotland)	DF	Sean Kelly	3	0	0	0	0	0	1	0	4	0
(Scotland)	DF	Richard Miller	7	1	0	0	1	0	0	0	8	1
(Scotland)	DF	Chris Moffat	0	0	0	0	0	0	0	0	0	0
(Scotland)	DF	Steven Tart	0	0	0	0	0	0	0	0	0	0
(Scotland)	MF	Jamie Benton	0	0	0	0	0	0	0	0	0	0
(Scotland)	MF	Mark Begg	3	0	0	0	0	0	0	0	3	0
(Scotland)	MF	Rhys Devlin	1	0	1	0	0	0	0	0	2	0
(Scotland)	MF	Craig Donaldson	0	0	0	0	0	0	0	0	0	0
(Scotland)	MF	David Greenhill	8	0	0	0	0	0	0	0	8	0
(Scotland)	MF	Michael Herd	5	0	0	0	0	0	0	0	5	0
(Scotland)	MF	Craig Hume	2	0	0	0	0	0	0	0	2	0
(Scotland)	MF	Michael Hunter	13	0	0	0	1	0	1	0	15	0
(Scotland)	MF	Conor Kelly	0	0	0	0	0	0	0	0	0	0
(Scotland)	MF	Graeme MacGregor	1	0	0	0	0	0	0	0	1	0
(England)	MF	Scott Maxwell	1	0	0	0	0	0	0	0	1	0
(Scotland)	MF	Jamie McKernon	1	0	0	0	0	0	0	0	1	0
(Scotland)	MF	Craig Scott	0	0	0	0	0	0	0	0	0	0
(Scotland)	MF	Nathan Shepherd	1	0	0	0	0	0	0	0	1	0
(Scotland)	MF	Andy Stirling	3	0	0	0	0	0	0	0	3	0
(Germany)	MF	Philipp Züfle	2	1	0	0	0	0	0	0	2	1
(Scotland)	FW	Kyle Gillespie	1	0	0	0	0	0	0	0	1	0
(Scotland)	FW	Alex Lurinsky	0	0	0	0	0	0	0	0	0	0
(Scotland)	FW	David McCaughie	0	0	0	0	0	0	0	0	0	0
(Scotland)	FW	Paul Quinn	1	0	0	0	0	0	1	0	2	0
(Scotland)	FW	Joseph Savage	0	0	0	0	0	0	0	0	0	0
(Scotland)	FW	Kevin Turner	10	1	0	0	1	0	0	0	11	1
(Scotland)	FW	Max Wright	0	0	0	0	0	0	0	0	0	0

== Team statistics ==
=== League table ===
Pos	Team	Pld	W	D	L	GF	GA	GD	Pts
6	Montrose	36	12	11	13	60	68	−8	47
7	Stirling Albion	36	12	9	15	59	58	+1	45
8	Annan Athletic	36	11	10	15	54	65	−11	43
9	Clyde	36	12	4	20	42	66	−24	40
10	East Stirlingshire	36	8	5	23	49	97	−48	29

Source: SPFL archive
Rules for classification: 1) points; 2) goal difference; 3) number of goals scored.

=== Division summary ===
Round	1	2	3	4	5	6	7	8	9	10	11	12	13	14	15	16	17	18	19	20	21	22	23	24	25	26	27	28	29	30	31	32	33	34	35	36
Ground	H	A	H	A	H	H	A	H	A	A	H	H	A	H	H	A	H	A	A	H	A	H	A	A	H	H	A	A	H	H	A	A	H	A	H	A
Result	L	L	L	L	W	W	L	W	L	W	L	L	L	D	D	L	D	L	W	L	D	L	D	W	W	W	L	L	L	L	L	L	L	L	L	L
Position	9	10	10	10	10	8	10	9	9	8	8	9	9	9	9	9	9	9	9	9	9	9	9	9	8	6	9	9	10	10	10	10	10	10	10	10

Updated to match(es) played on 13 May 2013. Source:
A = Away; H = Home; W = Win; D = Draw; L = Loss

== Transfers ==
=== Players in ===
Player	To	Fee
(Scotland) David Greenhill	(Scotland) Berwick Rangers	Free
(Scotland) Michael Hunter	(Scotland) Stenhousemuir	Free
(Scotland) Richard Miller	(Scotland) Vale of Leven	Free
(Scotland) Rhys Devlin	(Scotland) Airdrie United	Free
(Scotland) Paul Quinn	(Scotland) Albion Rovers	Free
(Scotland) Nathan Shepherd	(Scotland) Stranraer	Free
(Scotland) Craig Donaldson	Free agent	Free
(Scotland) Mark Begg	(Scotland) St Roch's	Free
(Scotland) Michael Herd	(Scotland) Whitehill Welfare	Free
(Scotland) Craig Hume	(Scotland) Lochend Amateurs	Free
(Scotland) Ryan McWilliams	(Scotland) Albion Rovers	Loan
(Scotland) Sean Kelly	(Scotland) St Mirren	Loan
(Scotland) Michael Dunlop	(Scotland) Forfar Athletic	Loan
(Germany) Philipp Züfle	(Germany) Bahlinger SC	Free
(Scotland) Jamie McKernon	(Scotland) St Mirren	Loan
(Wales) Jordan Holt	(Scotland) St Mirren	Loan
(Scotland) Andy Stirling	Free agent	Free
(Scotland) Raymond Buchanan	(Scotland) Whitletts Victoria	Undisclosed
(Scotland) Max Wright	(Scotland) Stranraer	Free
(Scotland) Jack Hamilton	(Scotland) Stenhousemuir	Loan
(Scotland) Chris Moffat	(Scotland) St Johnstone	Loan
(Scotland) Graeme MacGregor	(Scotland) St Mirren	Free

=== Players out ===
Player	To	Fee
(England) David Cane	(Scotland) Bo'ness United	Free
(Scotland) Joe Dingwall	(Scotland) Edinburgh City	Free
(Scotland) Ryan Frances	Free agent	Free
(Scotland) Scott Fulton	(Scotland) Renfrew	Free
(Scotland) Jordyn Sheerin	(Scotland) Camelon Juniors	Free
(Scotland) Andy Stirling	Free agent	Free
(Scotland) Fraser Team	(Scotland) Knightswood Juveniles	Free
(Scotland) Alex Lurinsky	(Scotland) Bo'ness United	Free
(Scotland) Steven Tart	(Scotland) Bellshill Athletic	Loan
(Scotland) Jamie Benton	(Scotland) Whitletts Victoria	Loan
(Scotland) Craig Hume	(Scotland) Tranent	Free
(Scotland) Craig Donaldson	(Scotland) Bo'ness United	Loan
(Scotland) Steven Tart	(Scotland) Bellshill Athletic	Loan
(Scotland) Craig Donaldson	(Scotland) Bo'ness United	Free
(Scotland) Mark Begg	(Scotland) Glasgow Perthshire	Loan
