= 2012–13 St Mirren F.C. season =

St Mirren
2012–13 season
- Chairman: Stewart Gilmour
- Manager: Danny Lennon
- Stadium: St Mirren Park
- SPL: 11th
- League Cup: Winners
- Scottish Cup: Quarter-final
- Top goalscorer: League: Steven Thompson (13); All: Steven Thompson (16)
- Highest home attendance: 6,347 vs Kilmarnock (2 January 2013)
- Lowest home attendance: 3,065 vs Inverness Caledonian Thistle (30 January 2013)
- Average home league attendance: League: 4,389
Home colours	Away colours	Third colours

The 2012–13 season was St Mirren's seventh consecutive season in the Scottish Premier League, having been promoted from the Scottish First Division at the end of the 2005–06 season. St Mirren also competed in the League Cup and the Scottish Cup.

== Summary ==
=== Season ===
St Mirren finished eleventh in the Scottish Premier League. They reached the Quarter-final of the Scottish Cup, and won the League Cup for the first time in the club's history, beating Heart of Midlothian 3–2 in the Final.

== Results and fixtures ==
Win Draw Loss Postponed

=== Preseason ===
12 July 2012 Friendly (Closed Door)	Barnsley	1 – 0	St Mirren	Cañete
17:30	Davies 4'	Report

14 July 2012 Friendly (Closed Door)	El Canete	0 – 3	St Mirren	Cañete
		Report	McAusland 19'; McGowan; Reilly 75'

21 July 2012 Renfrewshire Cup Final	Greenock Morton	0 – 1	St Mirren	Cappielow
15:00		Report	McGowan 81'	Attendance: 3,722; Referee: Muir

24 July 2012 Friendly	Dumbarton	0 – 0	St Mirren	Dumbarton Football Stadium
19:30		Dumbarton Report; Report		Referee: Cook

27 July 2012 Friendly	Carlisle United	1 – 0	St Mirren	Brunton Park
19:15	Miller 63'	Report		Attendance: 1,643

29 July 2012 Friendly	Accrington Stanley	1 – 1	St Mirren	Crown Ground
15:00	Miller 76'	Accrington Report; St Mirren Report	Thompson 73'	Attendance: 797

=== Scottish Premier League ===
4 August 2012 1	St Mirren	2 – 2	Inverness Caledonian Thistle	St Mirren Park
15:00	Guy 32'; McGregor 90+2'; Guy (red card) 90+3'	BBC Report	Ross 70'; McKay 76'	Attendance: 4,104; Referee: McLean

11 August 2012 2	Dundee	0 – 2	St Mirren	Dens Park
15:00		BBC Report	McLean 39'; Parkin 63'	Attendance: 5,984; Referee: Allan

18 August 2012 3	St Mirren	1 – 2	Hibernian	St Mirren Park
15:00	Thompson 63'	BBC Report	Griffiths 15', 61'	Attendance: 5,039; Referee: Charleston

26 August 2012 4	Motherwell	1 – 1	St Mirren	Fir Park
15:00	Higdon 2'; Hutchinson (yellow card) 88' (red card)	BBC Report	Reilly 90+4'	Attendance: 4,559; Referee: Norris

1 September 2012 5	Aberdeen	0 – 0	St Mirren	Pittodrie
15:00		BBC Report		Attendance: 9,288; Referee: Colvin

15 September 2012 6	St Mirren	2 – 0	Heart of Midlothian	St Mirren Park
15:00	Goodwin 38'; Guy 48'	BBC Report		Attendance: 4,307; Referee: Murray

22 September 2012 7	Kilmarnock	3 – 1	St Mirren	Rugby Park
15:00	Sheridan 26'; Fowler 57'; Dayton 61'	BBC Report	McGowan 83'	Attendance: 4,879; Referee: O'Reilly

29 September 2012 8	St Mirren	5 – 4	Ross County	St Mirren Park
15:00	Thompson 39', 89'; Guy 54' (Penalty); Parkin 59'; McLean 64'	BBC Report	Vigurs 11'; Munro 45'; Quinn 79', 80'	Attendance: 3,706; Referee: Mclean

6 October 2012 9	St Johnstone	2 – 1	St Mirren	McDiarmid Park
15:00	Hasselbaink 22'; Davidson 37'	BBC Report	Guy 49'	Attendance: 3,223; Referee: Muir

20 October 2012 10	St Mirren	0 – 5	Celtic	St Mirren Park
12:30		BBC Report	Hooper 15'; Ambrose 18'; Wanyama 32', 38'; Watt 86'	Attendance: 6,008; Referee: Murray

27 October 2012 11	St Mirren	0 – 1	Dundee United	St Mirren Park
15:00		BBC Report	Russell 69' (pen.)	Attendance: 4,333; Referee: Norris

3 November 2012 12	Hibernian	2 – 1	St Mirren	Easter Road
15:00	Griffiths 37', 65'	BBC Report	McLean 32'; Goodwin (yellow card) 67' (yellow-red card)	Attendance: 10,358; Referee: Muir

10 November 2012 13	St Mirren	1 – 4	Aberdeen	St Mirren Park
15:00	Thompson 88'	BBC Report	Hayes 10'; McGinn 45+1'; Clark 86'; Reynolds 87'	Attendance: 4,486; Referee: Finnie

17 November 2012 14	Heart of Midlothian	1 – 0	St Mirren	Tynecastle Stadium
15:00	Grainger 64'	BBC Report		Attendance: 16,443; Referee: Madden

24 November 2012 15	St Mirren	3 – 1	Dundee	St Mirren Park
15:00	Thompson 31', 72'; Imrie 87'	BBC Report	Nish (red card) 27'; Conroy 64' (Penalty)	Attendance: 4,825; Referee: Collum

27 November 2012 16	Ross County	0 – 0	St Mirren	Victoria Park
19:45		BBC Report		Attendance: 2,837; Referee: McLean

8 December 2012 17	St Mirren	1 – 1	St Johnstone	St Mirren Park
15:00	Dummett 69'	BBC Report	Davidson 15'; Anderson (red card) 38'; Millar (yellow card) 68' (yellow-red card)	Attendance: 3,702; Referee: Madden

15 December 2012 18	Celtic	2 – 0	St Mirren	Celtic Park
15:00	Wanyama 15'; Hooper 83'	BBC Report		Attendance: 47,790; Referee: Murray

21 December 2012 19	St Mirren	2 – 1	Motherwell	St Mirren Park
19:45	Thompson 39', 42'	BBC Report	McHugh 77'	Attendance: 4,023; Referee: Brines

26 December 2012 20	Inverness Caledonian Thistle	2 – 2	St Mirren	Caledonian Stadium
15:00	Shinnie 38'; Foran 67'	BBC Report	Imrie 2'; Thompson 55'	Attendance: 3,506; Referee: Collum

30 December 2012 21	Dundee United	3 – 4	St Mirren	Tannadice Park
15:00	Daly 43'; Armstrong 45'; McLean (red card) 69'; Douglas 90'	BBC Report; SKY Report	Dummett 16'; Thompson 50'; McAusland 66' van Zanten 78'	Attendance: 6,386; Referee: Norris

2 January 2013 22	St Mirren	1 – 1	Kilmarnock	St Mirren Park
15:00	McGowan 68' (Penalty)	BBC Report	Kelly 5' (Penalty)	Attendance: 6,347; Referee: Colvin

19 January 2013 23	St Mirren	1 – 4	Ross County	St Mirren Park
12:45	Thompson 50'	BBC Report	Brittain 22'; Morrow 67'; Sproule 71', 74'	Attendance: 3,802; Referee: Norris

30 January 2013 24	St Mirren	2 – 1	Inverness Caledonian Thistle	St Mirren Park
19:45	Gonçalves 26'; Thompson 82'	BBC Report	McKay 45' (Penalty)	Attendance: 3,065; Referee: Muir

9 February 2013 25	Aberdeen	0 – 0	St Mirren	Pittodrie Stadium
15:00		BBC Report		Attendance: 7,240; Referee: Beaton

16 February 2013 26	St Mirren	0 – 1	Hibernian	St Mirren Park
15:00		BBC Report	Griffiths 72' (pen.)	Attendance: 4,524; Referee: Collum

23 February 2013 27	St Johnstone	1 – 0	St Mirren	McDiarmid Park
15:00	Vine 52'	BBC Report		Attendance: 2,816; Referee: Mclean

27 February 2013 28	St Mirren	2 – 0	Heart of Midlothian	St Mirren Park
19:45	McGowan 4' (Penalty); Carey 45'	BBC Report		Attendance: 3,369; Referee: Clancy

6 March 2013 29	Dundee	2 – 1	St Mirren	Dens Park
19:45	Baird 68'; McAlister 78'	BBC Report	Imrie 20'	Attendance: 3,674; Referee: Finnie

9 March 2013 30	St Mirren	0 – 0	Dundee United	St Mirren Park
15:00		BBC Report	Rankin (red card) 88'	Attendance: 3,394; Referee: Beaton

31 March 2013 31	St Mirren	1 – 1	Celtic	St Mirren Park
15:00	McGowan 81' (pen.)	BBC Report	Commons 6'; Wanyama (red card) 55'	Attendance: 6,066; Referee: Madden

3 April 2013 32	Kilmarnock	1 – 1	St Mirren	Rugby Park
19:45	Boyd 47'	BBC Report	Gonçalves 36'	Attendance: 4,494; Referee: Allan

6 April 2013 33	Motherwell	2 – 2	St Mirren	Fir Park
15:00	Higdon 34'; McFadden 84'	BBC Report	Newton 41'; Guy 75'	Attendance: 5,414; Referee: Colvin

20 April 2013 34	St Mirren	1 – 2	Dundee	St Mirren Park
15:00	Thompson 52'; Goodwin (yellow card) 65' (yellow-red card)	BBC Report	McAlister 40'; Finnigan 81'	Attendance: 4,002; Referee: Thomson

27 April 2013 35	Hibernian	3 – 3	St Mirren	Easter Road
15:00	Griffiths 31', 86'; Caldwell 67'	BBC Report	Esmaël Gonçalves 60'; McAusland 78', 82'	Attendance: 9,264; Referee: Crawford Allan

4 May 2013 36	Heart of Midlothian	3 – 0	St Mirren	Tynecastle Stadium
15:00	Walker 13'; McHattie 43'; Hamill 54' (Penalty)	BBC Report	McLean (red card) 54'	Attendance: 16,312; Referee: Colvin

11 May 2013 37	St Mirren	0 – 0	Aberdeen	St Mirren Park
15:00		BBC Report		Attendance: 4,292; Referee: McKendrick

18 May 2013 38	Kilmarnock	1 – 3	St Mirren	Rugby Park
15:00	Boyd 25'	BBC Report	McGinn 20'; McGowan 75' (Penalty); Newton 88'	Attendance: 4,428; Referee: Collum

=== Scottish League Cup ===
29 August 2012 Scottish League Cup round 2	St Mirren	5 – 1	Ayr United	St Mirren Park
19:45	Guy 16'; Thompson 24'; McGowan 30'; McLean 38' (Penalty); Teale 58'	BBC Report	Moffat 39'	Attendance: 2,306; Referee: Tumilty

25 September 2012 Scottish League Cup round 3	St Mirren	1 – 0	Hamilton Academical	St Mirren Park
19:45	Mair 90+2'	BBC Report; SFL Report		Attendance: 1,914; Referee: Allan

30 October 2012 Scottish League Cup QF	Aberdeen	2 – 2 (a.e.t.) (2 – 4 p)	St Mirren	Pittodrie Stadium
19:45	Vernon 22'; Magennis 90+1'	BBC Report	Parkin 6'; McLean 69'	Attendance: 7,610; Referee: Allan
	Penalties
	Hughes (penalty missed); McGinn (penalty scored); Hayes (penalty scored); Smith (penalty missed)		McLean (penalty scored); Teale (penalty scored); Goodwin (penalty scored); McAusland (penalty scored)

27 January 2013 Scottish League Cup SF	St Mirren	3 – 2	Celtic	Hampden Park
14:30	Gonçalves 8'; McGowan 64' (pen.); Thompson 69'	BBC Report	Hooper 45'; Mulgrew 90+4'	Referee: Collum

17 March 2013 Scottish League Cup Final	Heart of Midlothian	2 – 3	St Mirren	Hampden Park
15:00	Stevenson 10', 85'	BBC Report	Goncalves 37'; Thompson 46'; Newton 66'	Attendance: 44,036; Referee: Thomson

=== Scottish Cup ===
1 December 2012 Scottish Cup round 4	St Mirren	2 – 0	Brechin City	St Mirren Park
15:00	McLean 32'; Robertson 42'	BBC Report		Attendance: 2,363; Referee: McKendrick

2 February 2013 Scottish Cup round 5	St Mirren	2 – 0	St Johnstone	St Mirren Park
15:00	Gonçalves 49', 56'	BBC Report		Attendance: 3,507; Referee: Thomson

2 March 2013 Scottish Cup Round QF	St Mirren	1 – 2	Celtic	St Mirren Park
12:45	Esmaël 13'	BBC Report	Ledley 5'; Stokes 21'	Attendance: 5,572; Referee: Muir

== Squad information ==
=== Captains ===
No.	P	Name	Country	No. games	Notes
6	MF	Jim Goodwin	(Republic of Ireland)	35	Club captain

Last updated: 18 May 2013
Source: Competitive match reports.
Competitive matches only
Matches started as captain only
Country: FIFA nationality; No.: Squad number; P: Position; Name: Player name; No. Games: Number of games started as captain.

=== Players ===
Last updated 18 May 2013

No.	Pos	Nat	Player	Total		Premier League		League Cup		Scottish Cup	
No.	Pos	Nat	Player	Apps	Goals	Apps	Goals	Apps	Goals	Apps	Goals
1	GK	(Scotland) SCO	Craig Samson	46	0	38+0	0	5+0	0	3+0	0
2	DF	(Republic of Ireland) IRL	David van Zanten	42	1	32+2	1	3+2	0	3+0	0
3	DF	(Wales) WAL	Paul Dummett	36	2	29+1	2	3+0	0	2+1	0
4	DF	(Scotland) SCO	Darren McGregor	3	1	3+0	1	0+0	0	0+0	0
5	DF	(Scotland) SCO	Lee Mair	31	1	21+3	0	3+2	1	2+0	0
6	MF	(Republic of Ireland) IRL	Jim Goodwin	35	1	29+0	1	5+0	0	1+0	0
7	FW	(Scotland) SCO	Dougie Imrie	30	3	13+14	3	2+0	0	0+1	0
8	MF	(Scotland) SCO	Jon Robertson	21	1	11+8	0	0+1	0	1+0	1
9	FW	(Scotland) SCO	Steven Thompson	41	16	33+1	13	4+1	3	2+0	0
10	FW	(Scotland) SCO	Paul McGowan	31	7	25+0	5	4+0	2	2+0	0
11	MF	(Republic of Ireland) IRL	Graham Carey	33	1	18+8	1	3+2	0	1+1	0
12	GK	(Scotland) SCO	Chris Smith	0	0	0+0	0	0+0	0	0+0	0
14	DF	(Scotland) SCO	Marc McAusland	44	3	35+1	3	5+0	0	3+0	0
15	MF	(Scotland) SCO	Graeme MacGregor	0	0	0+0	0	0+0	0	0+0	0
16	GK	(Scotland) SCO	Grant Adam	0	0	0+0	0	0+0	0	0+0	0
17	MF	(Scotland) SCO	Kenny McLean	33	6	26+3	3	3+0	2	1+0	1
18	MF	(Scotland) SCO	Jamie McKernon	0	0	0+0	0	0+0	0	0+0	0
19	FW	(England) ENG	Sam Parkin	33	3	12+15	2	2+2	1	1+1	0
20	FW	(Scotland) SCO	Thomas Reilly	10	1	2+7	1	0+0	0	0+1	0
21	MF	(Scotland) SCO	Gary Teale	37	1	23+7	0	4+0	1	3+0	0
22	DF	(Scotland) SCO	Jason Naismith	0	0	0+0	0	0+0	0	0+0	0
23	DF	(Scotland) SCO	David Barron	15	0	8+4	0	1+1	0	0+1	0
24	MF	(Scotland) SCO	Mark Lamont	0	0	0+0	0	0+0	0	0+0	0
24	MF	(England) ENG	Conor Newton	20	3	16+0	2	2+0	1	2+0	0
25	DF	(Scotland) SCO	Sean Kelly	0	0	0+0	0	0+0	0	0+0	0
27	FW	(England) ENG	Lewis Guy	35	6	17+12	5	2+2	1	1+1	0
28	FW	(Scotland) SCO	Jack Smith	2	0	0+2	0	0+0	0	0+0	0
29	MF	(Scotland) SCO	John McGinn	27	1	15+7	1	2+0	0	3+0	0
33	MF	(Scotland) SCO	Mohammed Yaqub	1	0	0+1	0	0+0	0	0+0	0
34	MF	(Scotland) SCO	Anton Brady	1	0	0+1	0	0+0	0	0+0	0
77	FW	(Portugal) POR	Esmaël Gonçalves	16	8	11+1	3	2+0	2	2+0	3
88	FW	(Estonia) EST	Sander Puri	3	0	1+2	0	0+0	0	0+0	0
—	DF	(Scotland) SCO	Paul McGinn	0	0	0+0	0	0+0	0	0+0	0

=== Disciplinary record ===
Includes all competitive matches.

Last updated 18 May 2013

Number	Nation	Position	Name	Premier League		League Cup		Scottish Cup		Total	
Number	Nation	Position	Name	Yellow card	Red card	Yellow card	Red card	Yellow card	Red card	Yellow card	Red card
1	(Scotland)	GK	Craig Samson	0	0	0	0	0	0	0	0
2	(Republic of Ireland)	DF	David van Zanten	5	0	1	0	0	0	6	0
3	(Wales)	DF	Paul Dummett	3	0	1	0	0	0	4	0
4	(Scotland)	DF	Darren McGregor	0	0	0	0	0	0	0	0
5	(Scotland)	DF	Lee Mair	4	0	0	0	0	0	4	0
6	(Republic of Ireland)	MF	Jim Goodwin	13	2	3	0	0	0	16	2
7	(Scotland)	DF	Dougie Imrie	3	0	0	0	0	0	3	0
8	(Scotland)	MF	Jon Robertson	0	0	0	0	0	0	0	0
9	(Scotland)	FW	Steven Thompson	5	0	0	0	1	0	6	0
10	(Scotland)	FW	Paul McGowan	3	0	0	0	1	0	4	0
11	(Republic of Ireland)	MF	Graham Carey	5	0	0	0	0	0	5	0
12	(Scotland)	GK	Chris Smith	0	0	0	0	0	0	0	0
14	(Scotland)	DF	Marc McAusland	10	0	0	0	0	0	10	0
15	(Scotland)	MF	Graeme MacGregor	0	0	0	0	0	0	0	0
16	(Scotland)	GK	Grant Adam	0	0	0	0	0	0	0	0
17	(Scotland)	MF	Kenny McLean	2	1	0	0	0	0	2	1
18	(Scotland)	MF	Jamie McKernon	0	0	0	0	0	0	0	0
19	(England)	FW	Sam Parkin	3	0	0	0	0	0	3	0
20	(Scotland)	FW	Thomas Reilly	0	0	0	0	0	0	0	0
21	(Scotland)	MF	Gary Teale	1	0	1	0	0	0	2	0
22	(Scotland)	DF	Jason Naismith	0	0	0	0	0	0	0	0
23	(Scotland)	DF	David Barron	1	0	1	0	0	0	2	0
24	(Scotland)	MF	Mark Lamont	0	0	0	0	0	0	0	0
24	(England)	MF	Conor Newton	2	0	1	0	0	0	3	0
25	(Scotland)	DF	Sean Kelly	0	0	0	0	0	0	0	0
27	(England)	FW	Lewis Guy	2	1	1	0	0	0	3	1
28	(Scotland)	FW	Jack Smith	0	0	0	0	0	0	0	0
29	(Scotland)	MF	John McGinn	1	0	0	0	0	0	1	0
33	(Scotland)	MF	Mohammed Yaqub	0	0	0	0	0	0	0	0
34	(Scotland)	MF	Anton Brady	0	0	0	0	0	0	0	0
77	(Portugal)	FW	Esmaël Gonçalves	2	0	1	0	0	0	3	0
88	(Estonia)	MF	Sander Puri	0	0	0	0	0	0	0	0
—	(Scotland)	DF	Paul McGinn	0	0	0	0	0	0	0	0

== Team statistics ==
=== League table ===
Pos	Team	Pld	W	D	L	GF	GA	GD	Pts	Qualification or relegation
8	Aberdeen	38	11	15	12	41	43	−2	48 (Note: Teams in the bottom half at the time of the split may not overtake a team in the top 6 at the time of the split.)	
9	Kilmarnock	38	11	12	15	52	53	−1	45	
10	Heart of Midlothian	38	11	11	16	40	49	−9	44	
11	St Mirren	38	9	14	15	47	60	−13	41	
12	Dundee (R)	38	7	9	22	28	66	−38	30	Relegation to the Championship

Source: SPFL Archive
Rules for classification: 1) points; 2) goal difference; 3) number of goals scored.
(R) Relegated

=== Division summary ===
Round	1	2	3	4	5	6	7	8	9	10	11	12	13	14	15	16	17	18	19	20	21	22	23	24	25	26	27	28	29	30	31	32	33	34	35	36	37	38
Ground	H	A	H	A	A	H	A	H	A	H	H	A	H	A	H	A	H	A	H	A	A	H	H	H	A	H	A	H	A	H	H	A	A	H	A	A	H	A
Result	D	W	L	D	D	W	L	W	L	L	L	L	L	L	W	D	D	L	W	D	W	D	L	W	D	L	L	W	L	D	D	D	D	L	D	L	D	W
Position	4	1	3	7	6	3	6	4	7	8	11	11	11	11	11	11	11	11	10	10	10	10	10	11	11	11	11	10	11	10	10	10	11	11	11	11	11	11

Updated to match(es) played on 18 May 2013. Source:
A = Away; H = Home; W = Win; D = Draw; L = Loss

== Transfers ==
=== Players in ===
Player	From	Fee
(Scotland) Jon Robertson	(Scotland) Cowdenbeath	Free
(England) Lewis Guy	Unattached	Free
(Scotland) Sam Parkin	(Scotland) Queen of the South	Free
(Scotland) Grant Adam	(Scotland) Rangers	Free
(Scotland) Chris Smith	(Scotland) Dunfermline Athletic	Free
(Wales) Paul Dummett	(England) Newcastle United	Loan
(Scotland) Mohammed Yaqub	(Scotland) Celtic	Free
(Scotland) Graeme MacGregor	(England) Bolton Wanderers	Free
(Scotland) Paul McGinn	(Scotland) Queen's Park	Free
(England) Conor Newton	(England) Newcastle United	Loan
(Portugal) Esmaël Gonçalves	(Portugal) Rio Ave	Loan
(Wales) Paul Dummett	(England) Newcastle United	Loan
(Estonia) Sander Puri	(Finland) Kuopion Palloseura	Free

=== Players out ===
Player	To	Fee
(Scotland) Hugh Murray	(Scotland) Partick Thistle	Free
(Scotland) Frankie Owens	Free agent	Free
(Scotland) David McAlinden	Free agent	Free
(Scotland) Jon McShane	(Scotland) Hamilton Academical	Free
(Scotland) Graeme Smith	(Scotland) Peterhead	Free
(Scotland) Hashim Cole	Free agent	Free
(Scotland) Steven Thomson	(England) Dover Athletic	Free
(Netherlands) Nigel Hasselbaink	(Scotland) St Johnstone	Free
(Netherlands) Jeroen Tesselaar	(Scotland) Kilmarnock	Free
(Scotland) Ross Meechan	Free agent	Free
(Scotland) Jason Naismith	(Scotland) Greenock Morton	Loan
(Scotland) Dominic Kennedy	Free agent	Free
(England) Adam McHugh	(England) Hartlepool United	Free
(Scotland) Michael McKinven	(Scotland) Pollok	Free
(Scotland) Kieran Wood	Free agent	Free
(Australia) Aaron Mooy	(Australia) Western Sydney Wanderers	Free
(Scotland) Sean Kelly	(Scotland) East Stirlingshire	Loan
(Scotland) Mark Lamont	(Scotland) Dumbarton	Loan
(Scotland) Jamie McKernon	(Scotland) East Stirlingshire	Loan
(Scotland) Grant Adam	(Scotland) Airdrie United	Loan
(Wales) Jordan Holt	(Scotland) East Stirlingshire	Loan
(Scotland) Paul McGinn	(Scotland) Queen's Park	Loan
(Scotland) Mark Lamont	(Scotland) Dumbarton	Free
(Scotland) Jon Robertson	(Scotland) Cowdenbeath	Loan
(Scotland) Paul McGinn	(Scotland) Dumbarton	Loan
(Scotland) Graeme MacGregor	(Scotland) East Stirlingshire	Free
(Scotland) Jason Naismith	(Scotland) Cowdenbeath	Loan
(Scotland) Chris Smith	(Scotland) Stenhousemuir	Loan

== See also ==
- List of St Mirren F.C. seasons
