= Gregg Wylde =

Scottish footballer (born 1991)

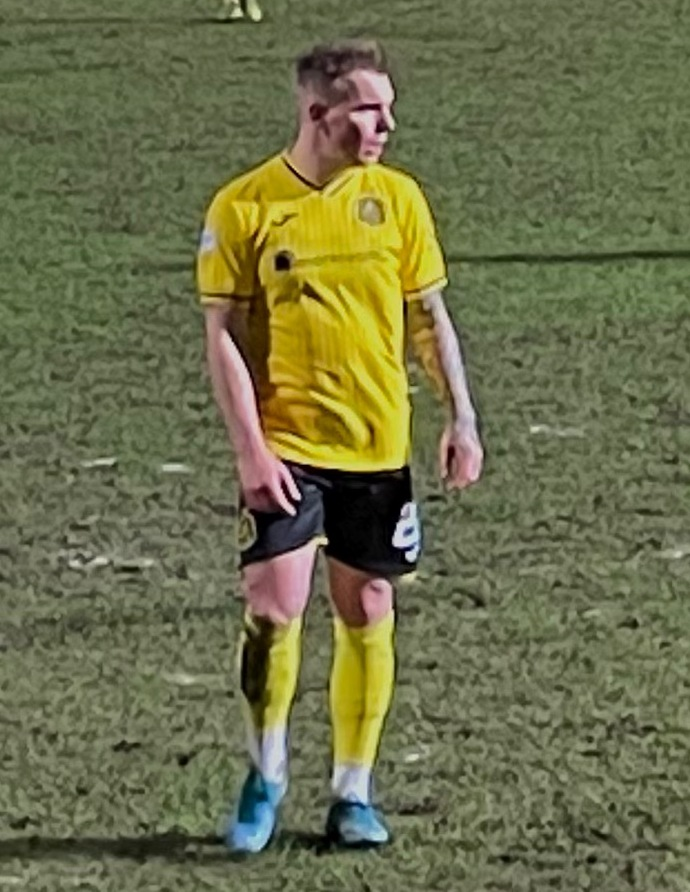
- Wylde playing for Dumbarton in 2022

Personal information
- Full name: Gregg Wylde
- Date of birth: 23 March 1991 (age 35)
- Place of birth: Kirkintilloch, Scotland
- Height: 5 ft 9 in (1.75 m)
- Position: Defender

Team information
- Current team: Camelon
- Number: 39

Youth career
- 1998–2005: Celtic
- 2005–2009: Rangers

Senior career*
| Years | Team | Apps | (Gls) |
| 2009–2012 | Rangers | 38 | (2) |
| 2012–2013 | Bolton Wanderers | 0 | (0) |
| 2012–2013 | → Bury (loan) | 4 | (0) |
| 2013–2014 | Aberdeen | 8 | (1) |
| 2014–2015 | St Mirren | 44 | (3) |
| 2015–2016 | Plymouth Argyle | 43 | (7) |
| 2016–2017 | Millwall | 5 | (0) |
| 2017 | → Northampton Town (loan) | 12 | (1) |
| 2017–2019 | Plymouth Argyle | 16 | (1) |
| 2018 | → Morecambe (loan) | 16 | (2) |
| 2019 | Livingston | 2 | (0) |
| 2020 | Clyde | 7 | (0) |
| 2020–2021 | East Stirlingshire | | |
| 2021–2022 | East Kilbride | | |
| 2022–2023 | Dumbarton | 41 | (6) |
| 2023– | Camelon | | |

International career
| 2008 | Scotland U17 | 4 | (1) |
| 2009–2010 | Scotland U19 | 3 | (0) |
| 2010–2012 | Scotland U21 | 7 | (0) |
- * Club domestic league appearances and goals as of 10:19, 10 January 2024 (UTC)

Gregg Wylde (born 23 March 1991) is a Scottish footballer who plays for Camelon in the East of Scotland League Premier Division.

He started his career with Rangers, but voluntarily left the club in March 2012, soon after it entered administration. He has since played for Bolton Wanderers, Aberdeen, St Mirren, Plymouth Argyle and Millwall, as well as having spells at Bury, Northampton Town, Morecambe, Livingston, Clyde, East Kilbride and Dumbarton.

== Career ==
=== Rangers ===
Wylde joined the Rangers youth system from Old Firm rivals Celtic when he was 14.

He made his first-team debut as a late substitute against Hamilton Academical on 29 August 2009. In the 2010–11 season, Wylde made his European debut in the Europa League last 16 tie against PSV, coming on as a substitute for Kyle Lafferty in the 80th minute, as Rangers drew 0–0 with the Dutch side. He then played the full 90 minutes in the second leg, which Rangers lost 1–0, exiting the competition. Wylde picked up his first senior honour with Rangers when playing from the start in a 2–1 victory over Celtic in the 2011 League Cup Final. Afterwards, Wylde revealed he didn't celebrate winning the cup; instead, he went to bed early.

At the start of the 2011–12 season, Wylde rejected an offer of a new contract from Rangers, leading to manager Ally McCoist remarking that the player's agent had "moved the goalposts" regard his demands. Following the rejection of the new contract offer, Wylde's father defended him and accused the club of treating him like an "outcast". On 15 August, Rangers confirmed that they had turned down a £400,000 bid from Bolton Wanderers for the player. Wylde scored his first goal for Rangers on 21 August 2011, during a 3–0 win over Motherwell. Four days later it was announced that he had signed a new five-year contract, with Rangers, keeping him at the club until 2016. Shortly after signing the new contract, Wylde said he was delighted to have signed and made it clear he wanted to stay at the club. On 5 November 2011, he was sent off in stoppage time against Dundee United for a wild challenge on Willo Flood in an eventual 3–1 win. After the match, McCoist told Wylde that he would have to learn from his mistake.

Wylde volunteered to have his contract terminated and to waive the redundancy payment he would have been entitled to when Rangers went into administration in early 2012. He said this was to try to help other members of staff keep their jobs at the club.

=== Bolton Wanderers ===
On 17 March 2012, Wylde signed a three-year contract with Bolton Wanderers, subject to authorisation and clearance from FIFA. By the end of the season, the player and club were still awaiting the authorisation, meaning that Wylde played no part in Bolton's relegation from the Premier League. Wylde expressed his disappointment at not getting the chance to play a game in the Premier League and described waiting to get clearance from FIFA to play as "frustrating".

However, his time at Bolton was disastrous after failing to earn a place in the first team and being told he was told surplus to requirements at the club. At the end of the 2012–13 season, Wylde was expected to make a return to Scotland. Bolton released Wylde at the end of the 2012–2013 season.

==== Bury (loan) ====
On 22 November 2012, Wylde joined League One club Bury on a month-long loan deal, which was extended for a further month. In the last sixteen of the Football League Trophy, Wylde missed the last penalty in the penalty-shootout, allowing Preston to win the match, after the teams had been level at 3–3 after extra-time. Shortly after the end of his loan, Bury manager Kevin Blackwell claimed that Wylde would be making a return to Scotland with a move to Hibernian. The Hibernian manager Pat Fenlon though wouldn't confirm if he would be signing the player.

=== Aberdeen ===
On 24 June 2013, free agent Wylde signed for Scottish Premiership side Aberdeen. After being released by Bolton, Wylde was linked with Motherwell, but opted to join Aberdeen instead. He scored his first and only goal for the club in a 2–0 win over Hibernian on 26 October 2013. Wylde had his contract with Aberdeen cancelled on 15 January 2014.

=== St Mirren ===
Wylde signed an 18-month contract at St Mirren on 15 January 2014.

Wylde made his St Mirren debut, coming on as a substitute for Jim Goodwin in the 65th minute, in a 3–2 win over Hibernian on 18 January 2014. In a match against Kilmarnock on 1 March 2014, Wylde came on as a substitute, where he set up a goal for Conor Newton and scored his first St Mirren goal, which St Mirren won 2–0. Wylde then scored his second goal of the season, in a 1–0 win over Ross County on 3 May 2014. Wylde made seventeen appearances for St Mirren in the second half of the season.

Wylde remained in the first team at the start of the season, making ten appearances until he suffered a groin injury. Wylde made his return, where he came on as a substitute for Kenny McLean, in a 1–0 loss against Motherwell on 20 December 2014. Weeks later on 1 January 2015, Wylde scored his first goal of the season, where he scored from a penalty in the last minutes, in a 2–1 loss against Kilmarnock. Wylde was released by Saints at the end of his contract, following the club's relegation from the Scottish Premiership.

=== Plymouth Argyle ===
On 30 June 2015, Wylde signed for Football League Two club Plymouth Argyle on a one-year contract. Wylde scored on his debut in a 2–0 win at AFC Wimbledon.

Wylde played 52 games for Argyle, scoring 7 goals, the most notable of which came on 16 April 2016, when he scored an 86th-minute winner against Portsmouth.

=== Millwall ===
On 25 June 2016, Wylde signed for Millwall, but made only 5 league appearances before being sent on loan to Northampton Town.

==== Northampton (loan) ====
On 31 December 2016, Wylde joined League One Northampton Town on loan until the end of the season. Three days later, he made his league debut for The Cobblers in a 1–2 home defeat against Bradford City. A week later, Wylde featured for Northampton in a 5–0 away defeat to Bristol Rovers in the league.

=== Return to Plymouth Argyle ===
On 28 June 2017, Wylde rejoined Plymouth Argyle, who had just been promoted to EFL League One. Wylde scored on his second Argyle debut, as a substitute, in a 2–1 defeat away to Peterborough United.

Following his loan spell at Morecambe, Wylde found a first-team place at Argyle hard to come by, and left the club through mutual termination of his contract on 7 January 2019.

==== Loan to Morecambe ====
On 30 January 2018, Wylde joined EFL League Two club Morecambe on loan. Wylde played 15 times for Morecambe, scoring two goals.

=== Livingston ===
Wylde signed an 18-month contract with Livingston in January 2019. On 2 September 2019, he left the club, his contract being cancelled having only made three appearances.

=== Clyde ===
On 4 January 2020 Wylde signed with Scottish League One club Clyde on a deal due to run to the end of the 2019/20 season.

=== East Stirlingshire ===
Lowland League club East Stirlingshire announced the signing of Wylde on 13 July 2020.

Wylde predominately played at left back until the Lowland League was suspended in January 2021.

=== East Kilbride ===
Wylde signed a pre-contract with East Kilbride in May 2021.

=== Dumbarton ===
Wylde joined Scottish League One side Dumbarton in January 2022, debuting as a trialist in a 6–2 defeat to Falkirk. He scored his first goal for the club the following week, a stunning long range strike in a 2–0 victory against East Fife on 15 January. After becoming an ever-present for the side in a left-midfield role, and winning the club's Player of the Month award for January 2023, Wylde agreed a new deal with the Sons in April 2023 but left the club seeking first team football five months later.

== Personal life ==
Wylde, who is the son of former player and manager Gordon Wylde, attended Kirkintilloch High School.

== Career statistics ==
As of 18:56, 9 September 2023 (UTC)

| Club | Season | League | | | Cup | | League Cup | | Europe | | Other | | Total | |
| Club | Season | Division | Apps | Goals | Apps | Goals | Apps | Goals | Apps | Goals | Apps | Goals | Apps | Goals |
|---|---|---|---|---|---|---|---|---|---|---|---|---|---|---|
| Rangers | 2009–10 | Scottish Premier League | 2 | 0 | 0 | 0 | 0 | 0 | 0 | 0 | 0 | 0 | 2 | 0 |
| Rangers | 2010–11 | Scottish Premier League | 15 | 0 | 1 | 0 | 3 | 0 | 2 (Note: Appearances in the UEFA Europa League) | 0 | 0 | 0 | 21 | 0 |
| Rangers | 2011–12 | Scottish Premier League | 21 | 2 | 2 | 0 | 1 | 0 | 1 | 0 | 0 | 0 | 25 | 2 |
| Rangers | Total | | 38 | 2 | 3 | 0 | 4 | 0 | 3 | 0 | 0 | 0 | 48 | 2 |
| Bolton Wanderers | 2012–13 | Championship | 0 | 0 | 0 | 0 | 0 | 0 | 0 | 0 | 0 | 0 | 0 | 0 |
| Bury (loan) | 2012–13 | League Two | 4 | 0 | 2 | 0 | 0 | 0 | 0 | 0 | 1 | 0 | 7 | 0 |
| Aberdeen | 2013–14 | Scottish Premiership | 8 | 1 | 1 | 0 | 1 | 0 | 0 | 0 | 0 | 0 | 10 | 1 |
| St Mirren | 2013–14 | Scottish Premiership | 17 | 2 | 0 | 0 | 0 | 0 | 0 | 0 | 0 | 0 | 17 | 2 |
| St Mirren | 2014–15 | Scottish Premiership | 27 | 1 | 0 | 0 | 2 | 0 | 0 | 0 | 0 | 0 | 29 | 1 |
| St Mirren | Total | | 44 | 3 | 0 | 0 | 2 | 0 | 0 | 0 | 0 | 0 | 46 | 3 |
| Plymouth Argyle | 2015–16 | League Two | 43 | 7 | 1 | 0 | 1 | 0 | 0 | 0 | 6 (Note: Three appearances in the Football League Trophy and three appearances in the League Two play-offs) | 0 | 51 | 7 |
| Millwall | 2016–17 | League One | 5 | 0 | 0 | 0 | 2 | 0 | 0 | 0 | 3 (Note: Appearances in the Football League Trophy) | 0 | 10 | 0 |
| Northampton Town (loan) | 2016–17 | League One | 12 | 1 | 0 | 0 | 0 | 0 | 0 | 0 | 0 | 0 | 12 | 1 |
| Plymouth Argyle | 2017–18 | League One | 9 | 1 | 0 | 0 | 1 | 0 | 0 | 0 | 3 (Note: Appearances in the EFL Trophy) | 0 | 13 | 1 |
| Plymouth Argyle | 2018–19 | League One | 7 | 0 | 0 | 0 | 2 | 0 | 0 | 0 | 2 | 0 | 11 | 0 |
| Plymouth Argyle | Total | | 16 | 1 | 0 | 0 | 3 | 0 | 0 | 0 | 5 | 0 | 24 | 1 |
| Morecambe (loan) | 2017–18 | League Two | 15 | 2 | 0 | 0 | 0 | 0 | 0 | 0 | 0 | 0 | 15 | 2 |
| Livingston | 2018–19 | Scottish Premiership | 2 | 0 | 1 | 0 | 0 | 0 | 0 | 0 | 0 | 0 | 3 | 0 |
| Livingston | 2019–20 | Scottish Premiership | 0 | 0 | 0 | 0 | 0 | 0 | 0 | 0 | 0 | 0 | 0 | 0 |
| Livingston | Total | | 2 | 0 | 1 | 0 | 0 | 0 | 0 | 0 | 0 | 0 | 3 | 0 |
| Clyde | 2019–20 | Scottish League One | 7 | 0 | 1 | 0 | 0 | 0 | 0 | 0 | 0 | 0 | 8 | 0 |
| Dumbarton | 2021–22 | Scottish League One | 13 | 2 | 0 | 0 | 0 | 0 | 0 | 0 | 1 | 0 | 14 | 2 |
| Dumbarton | 2022–23 | Scottish League Two | 28 | 4 | 3 | 0 | 4 | 0 | 0 | 0 | 3 | 0 | 38 | 4 |
| Dumbarton | 2023–24 | Scottish League Two | 0 | 0 | 0 | 0 | 4 | 0 | 0 | 0 | 2 | 0 | 6 | 0 |
| Dumbarton | Total | | 41 | 6 | 3 | 0 | 8 | 0 | 0 | 0 | 6 | 0 | 58 | 6 |
| Career total | | | 235 | 23 | 12 | 0 | 21 | 0 | 3 | 0 | 21 | 0 | 292 | 23 |

== Honours ==
Rangers

- Scottish Premier League: 2010–11
- Scottish League Cup: 2010–11
