= 2013–14 St Mirren F.C. season =

St Mirren
2013–14 season
- Chairman: Stewart Gilmour
- Manager: Danny Lennon
- Stadium: St Mirren Park
- Premiership: 8th
- League Cup: Second round lost to Queen of the South
- Scottish Cup: Fifth round lost to Dundee United
- Top goalscorer: League: Steven Thompson (13); All: Steven Thompson (16)
- Highest home attendance: 6,311 vs Heart of Midlothian (10 May 2014)
- Lowest home attendance: 2,817 vs St Johnstone (25 March 2014)
- Average home league attendance: 4,511
Home colours	Away colours	Third colours

The 2013–14 season was the club's first season in the newly formed Scottish Premiership and their eighth consecutive appearance in the top flight of Scottish football. St Mirren also competed in the League Cup and the Scottish Cup.

== Summary ==
St Mirren finished eighth in the inaugural Scottish Premiership season. They reached the fifth round of the Scottish Cup, and crashed out as holders of the League Cup in the second round.

== Results and fixtures ==
Win Draw Loss Postponed

=== Preseason ===
13 July 2013 Friendly	Charlton Athletic	4–0	St Mirren	Marbella
10:00	Jackson 13'; Hollands 50'; Kermorgant 65'; Green 86'	Report

17 July 2013 Renfrewshire Cup Semi-final	St Mirren	16–0	Port Glasgow OBU	Ralston Training Complex
19:30	Reilly 3' (pen.), 13', 36', 59'; Brady 12', 25', 72'; McGregor 19', 68'; Yaqub 38'; Cuddihy 46'; Kelly 56'; Stewart 85'; Scullion	Report

20 July 2013 Renfrewshire Cup Final	St Mirren	2–4	Greenock Morton	St Mirren Park
15:00	McGowan 20'; Teale 44'	Report	O'Brien 21'; Cham 36', 65'; Hands 46'	Attendance: 3,703; Referee: Aitken

24 July 2013 Friendly	Queen of the South	4–2	St Mirren	Palmerston Park
19:45	McKenna 23'; Paton 51' (pen.); Lyle 72', 88'	Report	Harkins 47'; Teale 67'	Attendance: 750; Referee: Murray

27 July 2013 Friendly	Stockport County	0–1	St Mirren	Edgeley Park
15:00		Report	Harkins 86'	Attendance: 1,171; Referee: Copeland

30 July 2013 Friendly	St Mirren	0–2	Newcastle United	St Mirren Park
19:45		Report	Cissé 19'; Debuchy 26'	Attendance: 4,216; Referee: Beaton

=== Scottish Premiership ===
3 August 2013 1	Inverness Caledonian Thistle	3–0	St Mirren	Caledonian Stadium
15:00	Vincent 47' (pen.); Doran 49'; McKay 57'	BBC Report		Attendance: 3,215; Referee: Clancy

17 August 2013 2	St Mirren	1–1	Kilmarnock	St Mirren Park
15:00	Harkins 65'	BBC Report	Boyd 49'	Attendance: 4,625; Referee: Beaton

24 August 2013 3	Ross County	3–0	St Mirren	Victoria Park
15:00	Kettlewell 9'; Brittain 24', 57'	BBC Report		Attendance: 3,142; Referee: Murray

31 August 2013 4	St Mirren	1–2	Partick Thistle	St Mirren Park
15:00	McLean 50'	BBC Report	Higginbotham 81'; Forbes 84'	Attendance: 5,601; Referee: Collum

14 September 2013 5	St Mirren	0–1	Motherwell	St Mirren Park
15:00		BBC Report	Sutton 38'	Attendance: 4,012; Referee: Thomson

21 September 2013 6	Hibernian	2–0	St Mirren	Easter Road
15:00	Collins 10'; Heffernan 61'	BBC Report		Attendance: 9,417; Referee: McLean

30 September 2013 7	St Mirren	1–1	Aberdeen	St Mirren Park
19:45	Thompson 54'	BBC Report	Pawlett 85'	Attendance: 4,051; Referee: Murray

5 October 2013 8	Heart of Midlothian	0–2	St Mirren	Tynecastle Stadium
15:00		BBC Report	McGinn 42'; McGowan 58'	Attendance: 14,769; Referee: Craig Thomson

19 October 2013 9	St Mirren	4–3	St Johnstone	St Mirren Park
15:00	McLean 8', 76' (pen.); McGowan 60'; Thompson 89'	BBC Report	MacLean 17'; Hasselbaink 61'; Fallon 84'	Attendance: 3,739; Referee: Collum

26 October 2013 10	Dundee United	4–0	St Mirren	Tannadice Park
15:00	Çiftçi 27', 34' (pen.); Gauld 59'; Erskine 83'	BBC Report		Attendance: 6,331; Referee: Brines

9 November 2013 11	Partick Thistle	0–3	St Mirren	Firhill Stadium
15:00		BBC Report	Thompson 15', 90'; Newton 72'	Attendance: 4,946; Referee: Graham Beaton

17 November 2013 12	St Mirren	2–1	Ross County	St Mirren Park
15:00	Thompson 35'; Newton 51'	BBC Report	Saunders 67'	Attendance: 4,205; Referee: Collum

23 November 2013 13	St Mirren	0–0	Hibernian	St Mirren Park
12:45		BBC Report		Attendance: 4,451; Referee: McLean

7 December 2013 14	St Mirren	0–0	Inverness Caledonian Thistle	St Mirren Park
15:00		BBC Report		Attendance: 3,305; Referee: Murray

14 December 2013 15	Aberdeen	2–0	St Mirren	Pittodrie Stadium
15:00	Vernon 20'; Robson 66'	BBC Report		Attendance: 9,332; Referee: Thomson

21 December 2013 16	Motherwell	3–0	St Mirren	Fir Park
15:00	Anier 31', 64'; Ainsworth 42'	BBC Report		Attendance: 3,867; Referee: Collum

26 December 2013 17	St Mirren	4–1	Dundee United	St Mirren Park
15:00	Thompson 12', 88'; McGinn 35'; Naismith 71'	BBC Report	Çiftçi 36'	Attendance: 4,780; Referee: Madden

29 December 2013 18	St Mirren	1–1	Heart of Midlothian	St Mirren Park
15:00	Thompson 3'	BBC Report	Hamill 48'	Attendance: 4,568; Referee: Clancy

2 January 2014 19	Kilmarnock	2–1	St Mirren	Rugby Park
15:00	McKenzie 29'; Boyd 90'	BBC Report	Campbell 18'	Attendance: 5,410; Referee: Brian Colvin

5 January 2014 20	St Mirren	0–4	Celtic	St Mirren Park
12:45		BBC Report	Mulgrew 53'; Stokes 58'; Commons 70', 72'	Attendance: 5,778; Referee: Beaton

11 January 2014 21	St Johnstone	2–0	St Mirren	McDiarmid Park
15:00	Davidson 71'; May 74'	BBC Report		Attendance: 2,329; Referee: Murray

18 January 2014 22	Hibernian	2–3	St Mirren	Easter Road
15:00	Collins 63', 89'	BBC Report	Williams 5' (Own goal); Campbell 24'; Thompson 26'	Attendance: 9,610; Referee: Collum

25 January 2014 23	St Mirren	0–0	Partick Thistle	St Mirren Park
15:00		BBC Report		Attendance: 4,660; Referee: Beaton

29 January 2014 24	Heart of Midlothian	2–1	St Mirren	Tynecastle Stadium
19:45	Paterson 5'; Hamill 52' (pen.)	BBC Report	Thompson 1'	Attendance: 12,422; Referee: McLean

2 February 2014 25	Celtic	1–0	St Mirren	Celtic Park
15:00	Commons 6'	BBC Report		Attendance: 45,014; Referee: Muir

15 February 2014 26	St Mirren	0–1	Aberdeen	St Mirren Park
12:30		BBC Report	Rooney 80' (pen.)	Attendance: 4,073; Referee: Murray

22 February 2014 27	Ross County	2–1	St Mirren	Victoria Park
15:00	Arquin 38' de Leeuw 83'	BBC Report	McGinn 66'	Attendance: 3,394; Referee: Collum

1 March 2014 28	St Mirren	2–0	Kilmarnock	St Mirren Park
15:00	Newton 79'; Wylde 88'	BBC Report		Attendance: 4,650; Referee: Allan

15 March 2014 29	Dundee United	3–2	St Mirren	Tannadice Park
15:00	Graham 79'; Armstrong 84'; Ciftci 90+3'	BBC Report	McGowan 20'; Thompson 40'	Attendance: 6,524; Referee: Thomson

22 March 2014 30	Celtic	3–0	St Mirren	Celtic Park
15:00	Johansen 44'; Griffiths 61'; Stokes 90+2'	BBC Sport		Attendance: 46,536; Referee: Finnie

25 March 2014 31	St Mirren	0–1	St Johnstone	St Mirren Park
19:45		BBC Report	MacLean 39'	Attendance: 2,817; Referee: Muir

29 March 2014 32	Inverness Caledonian Thistle	2–2	St Mirren	Caledonian Stadium
15:00	Draper 16'; Tansey 34'	BBC Report	Naismith 3'; Kelly 62'	Attendance: 3,032; Referee: Collum

5 April 2014 33	St Mirren	3–2	Motherwell	St Mirren Park
15:00	Thompson 42', 87'; McLean 86' (pen.)	BBC Report	Anier 17'; Sutton 27'	Attendance: 4,377; Referee: Norris

19 April 2014 34	St Mirren	2–0	Hibernian	St Mirren Park
15:00	McLean 1'; McGowan 15'	BBC Report		Attendance: 5,287; Referee: Clancy

25 April 2014 35	Partick Thistle	1–1	St Mirren	Firhill Stadium
19:45	Doolan 26'	BBC Report	McLean 45' (pen.)	Attendance: 5,971; Referee: Murray

3 May 2014 36	St Mirren	1–0	Ross County	St Mirren Park
15:00	Wylde 79'	BBC Report		Attendance: 4,414; Referee: Thomson

7 May 2014 37	Kilmarnock	1–0	St Mirren	Rugby Park
19:45	Boyd 21'	BBC Report		Attendance: 4,911; Referee: Muir

10 May 2014 38	St Mirren	1–1	Heart of Midlothian	St Mirren Park
12:15	Newton 28'	BBC Report	Carrick 48'	Attendance: 6,311; Referee: Finnie

=== Scottish League Cup ===
27 August 2013 Round 2	Queen of the South	2–1 (a.e.t.)	St Mirren	Palmerston Park
19:45	McKenna 103'; Paton 115'	BBC Report	Thompson 95'	Attendance: 2,073; Referee: Charleston

=== Scottish Cup ===
30 November 2013 Round 4	Queen of the South	2–2	St Mirren	Palmerston Park
15:00	Russell 35'; Paton 72'	BBC Report	Newton 9'; Thompson 51'	Attendance: 2,176; Referee: Clancy

10 December 2013 Round 4 replay	St Mirren	3–0	Queen of the South	St Mirren Park
19:45	Harkins 19'; Thompson 74'; Kelly 87'	BBC Report		Attendance: 2,775; Referee: Allan

9 January 2014 Round 5	Dundee United	2–1	St Mirren	Tannadice Park
12:00	Gauld 21'; Çiftçi 51'	BBC Report	McLean 26' (pen.)	Attendance: 4,952; Referee: Thomson

== Player statistics ==
=== Captains ===
No.	P	Name	Country	No. games	Notes
6	MF	Jim Goodwin	(Republic of Ireland)	36	Club captain

Last updated: 28 August 2013
Source: Competitive match reports.
Competitive matches only
Matches started as captain only
Country: FIFA nationality; No.: Squad number; P: Position; Name: Player name; No. Games: Number of games started as captain.

=== Squad information ===
Last updated 10 May 2014

No.	Pos	Nat	Player	Total		Premiership		League Cup		Scottish Cup	
No.	Pos	Nat	Player	Apps	Goals	Apps	Goals	Apps	Goals	Apps	Goals
1	GK	(Wales) WAL	David Cornell	6	0	5+0	0	1+0	0	0+0	0
2	DF	(Republic of Ireland) IRL	David van Zanten	18	0	8+8	0	1+0	0	1+0	0
4	DF	(Scotland) SCO	Darren McGregor	38	0	35+0	0	0+0	0	3+0	0
5	DF	(Scotland) SCO	Lee Mair	6	0	5+1	0	0+0	0	0+0	0
6	MF	(Republic of Ireland) IRL	Jim Goodwin	36	0	31+1	0	1+0	0	3+0	0
7	MF	(Scotland) SCO	John McGinn	38	2	31+4	2	1+0	0	2+0	0
8	MF	(Scotland) SCO	Gary Harkins	17	2	7+8	1	1+0	0	1+0	1
9	FW	(Scotland) SCO	Steven Thompson	41	16	37+0	13	1+0	1	3+0	2
10	FW	(Scotland) SCO	Paul McGowan	38	4	32+3	4	0+1	0	2+0	0
11	MF	(Scotland) SCO	Kenny McLean	34	7	28+2	6	1+0	0	3+0	1
12	FW	(England) ENG	Adam Campbell	12	2	7+4	2	0+0	0	0+1	0
14	DF	(Scotland) SCO	Marc McAusland	36	0	30+2	0	1+0	0	3+0	0
15	MF	(Scotland) SCO	Jon Robertson	1	0	0+1	0	0+0	0	0+0	0
16	DF	(England) ENG	Jake Caprice	7	0	0+6	0	0+1	0	0+0	0
16	FW	(Northern Ireland) NIR	Josh Magennis	13	0	7+6	0	0+0	0	0+0	0
17	FW	(Scotland) SCO	Thomas Reilly	10	0	1+7	0	0+0	0	0+2	0
18	DF	(Scotland) SCO	Sean Kelly	36	2	32+1	1	0+0	0	2+1	1
19	FW	(France) FRA	Stéphane Bahoken	5	0	2+3	0	0+0	0	0+0	0
20	MF	(Republic of Ireland) IRL	Kealan Dillon	0	0	0+0	0	0+0	0	0+0	0
21	MF	(Scotland) SCO	Gary Teale	18	0	6+10	0	1+0	0	0+1	0
22	DF	(Scotland) SCO	Jason Naismith	29	2	26+1	2	0+0	0	2+0	0
23	DF	(Scotland) SCO	David Barron	0	0	0+0	0	0+0	0	0+0	0
24	MF	(England) ENG	Conor Newton	41	5	36+1	4	1+0	0	3+0	1
25	MF	(Scotland) SCO	Mo Yaqub	0	0	0+0	0	0+0	0	0+0	0
26	MF	(Scotland) SCO	Anthony Brady	2	0	0+1	0	0+0	0	0+1	0
27	DF	(England) ENG	Danny Grainger	15	0	10+3	0	1+0	0	1+0	0
28	GK	(Slovakia) SVK	Marián Kello	24	0	21+0	0	0+0	0	3+0	0
29	GK	(Scotland) SCO	Kieran Hughes	0	0	0+0	0	0+0	0	0+0	0
30	GK	(France) FRA	Christopher Dilo	13	0	12+1	0	0+0	0	0+0	0
39	MF	(Scotland) SCO	Gregg Wylde	17	2	7+10	2	0+0	0	0+0	0
99	MF	(Cameroon) CMR	Eric Djemba-Djemba	3	0	2+0	0	0+0	0	1+0	0

=== Disciplinary record ===
Includes all competitive matches.

Last updated 10 May 2014

Number	Nation	Position	Name	Premiership		League Cup		Scottish Cup		Total	
Number	Nation	Position	Name	Booked	Sent off (straight red)	Booked	Sent off (straight red)	Booked	Sent off (straight red)	Booked	Sent off (straight red)
1	(Wales)	GK	David Cornell	0	0	0	0	0	0	0	0
2	(Republic of Ireland)	DF	David van Zanten	3	1	1	0	0	0	4	1
4	(Scotland)	DF	Darren McGregor	0	0	0	0	0	0	0	0
5	(Scotland)	DF	Lee Mair	1	0	0	0	0	0	1	0
6	(Republic of Ireland)	MF	Jim Goodwin	13	0	0	0	2	0	15	0
7	(Scotland)	MF	John McGinn	7	0	0	0	2	0	9	0
8	(Scotland)	MF	Gary Harkins	0	0	1	0	0	0	1	0
9	(Scotland)	FW	Steven Thompson	5	0	0	0	1	0	6	0
10	(Scotland)	FW	Paul McGowan	4	0	0	0	0	0	4	0
11	(Scotland)	MF	Kenny McLean	2	0	0	0	1	0	3	0
12	(England)	FW	Adam Campbell	1	0	0	0	0	0	1	0
14	(Scotland)	DF	Marc McAusland	4	1	1	0	0	0	5	1
15	(Scotland)	MF	Jon Robertson	0	0	0	0	0	0	0	0
16	(England)	DF	Jake Caprice	0	0	0	0	0	0	0	0
16	(Northern Ireland)	FW	Josh Magennis	0	0	0	0	0	0	0	0
17	(Scotland)	FW	Thomas Reilly	1	0	0	0	0	0	1	0
18	(Scotland)	MF	Sean Kelly	1	0	0	0	0	0	1	0
19	(France)	FW	Stéphane Bahoken	0	0	0	0	0	0	0	0
20	(Republic of Ireland)	MF	Kealan Dillon	0	0	0	0	0	0	0	0
21	(Scotland)	MF	Gary Teale	0	0	0	0	0	0	0	0
22	(Scotland)	DF	Jason Naismith	3	0	0	0	1	0	4	0
23	(Scotland)	DF	David Barron	0	0	0	0	0	0	0	0
24	(England)	MF	Conor Newton	3	0	0	0	0	0	3	0
25	(Scotland)	MF	Mo Yaqub	0	0	0	0	0	0	0	0
26	(Scotland)	MF	Anthony Brady	0	0	0	0	0	0	0	0
27	(England)	DF	Danny Grainger	2	1	0	0	0	0	2	1
28	(Slovakia)	GK	Marián Kello	0	0	0	0	0	0	0	0
29	(Scotland)	GK	Kieran Hughes	0	0	0	0	0	0	0	0
30	(France)	GK	Christopher Dilo	0	0	0	0	0	0	0	0
39	(Scotland)	MF	Gregg Wylde	0	0	0	0	0	0	0	0
99	(Cameroon)	MF	Eric Djemba-Djemba	1	0	0	0	1	0	2	0

== Team statistics ==
=== League table ===
Pos	Team	Pld	W	D	L	GF	GA	GD	Pts	Qualification or relegation
1	Celtic (C)	38	31	6	1	102	25	+77	99	Qualification for the Champions League second qualifying round
2	Motherwell	38	22	4	12	64	60	+4	70	Qualification for the Europa League second qualifying round
3	Aberdeen	38	20	8	10	53	38	+15	68	Qualification for the Europa League first qualifying round
4	Dundee United	38	16	10	12	65	50	+15	58	
5	Inverness Caledonian Thistle	38	16	9	13	44	44	0	57	
6	St Johnstone	38	15	8	15	48	42	+6	53	Qualification for the Europa League second qualifying round (Note: St Johnstone, as winners of the 2013–14 Scottish Cup, qualified for the Europa League second qualifying round.)
7	Ross County	38	11	7	20	44	62	−18	40	
8	St Mirren	38	10	9	19	39	58	−19	39	
9	Kilmarnock	38	11	6	21	45	66	−21	39	
10	Partick Thistle	38	8	14	16	46	65	−19	38	
11	Hibernian (R)	38	8	11	19	31	51	−20	35	Qualification for the Premiership play-off final
12	Heart of Midlothian (R)	38	10	8	20	45	65	−20	23 (Note: Heart of Midlothian were deducted 15 points for entering administration)	Relegation to the Championship

Source: SPFL Archive
Rules for classification: 1) points; 2) goal difference; 3) number of goals scored.
(C) Champions; (R) Relegated

=== Division summary ===
Round	1	2	3	4	5	6	7	8	9	10	11	12	13	14	15	16	17	18	19	20	21	22	23	24	25	26	27	28	29	30	31	32	33	34	35	36	37	38
Ground	A	H	A	H	H	A	H	A	H	A	A	H	H	H	A	A	H	H	A	H	A	A	H	A	A	H	A	H	A	A	H	A	H	H	A	H	A	H
Result	L	D	L	L	L	L	D	W	W	L	W	W	D	D	L	L	W	D	L	L	L	W	D	L	L	L	L	W	L	L	L	D	W	W	D	W	L	D
Position	11	10	11	11	11	11	11	10	10	11	9	8	8	8	8	8	8	8	9	9	9	8	9	9	9	9	11	9	11	11	11	11	10	8	7	7	8	8

Updated to match(es) played on 10 May 2014. Source:
A = Away; H = Home; W = Win; D = Draw; L = Loss

== Transfers ==
=== Players in ===
Player	From	Fee
(Scotland) Gary Harkins	(Scotland) Dundee	Free
(England) Danny Grainger	(Scotland) Heart of Midlothian	Free
(Republic of Ireland) Kealan Dillon	(England) Hull City	Free
(Wales) David Cornell	(Wales) Swansea City	Loan
(France) Christopher Dilo	(England) Blackburn Rovers	Free
(England) Conor Newton	(England) Newcastle United	Loan
(England) Jake Caprice	(England) Blackpool	Loan
(France) Stéphane Bahoken	(France) Nice	Loan
(Slovakia) Marián Kello	(England) Wolverhampton Wanderers	Free
(England) Adam Campbell	(England) Newcastle United	Loan
(Scotland) Gregg Wylde	(Scotland) Aberdeen	Free
(Northern Ireland) Josh Magennis	(Scotland) Aberdeen	Loan
(Cameroon) Eric Djemba-Djemba	(Serbia) FK Partizan	Free

=== Players out ===
Player	To	Fee
(Scotland) Craig Samson	(Scotland) Kilmarnock	Free
(Scotland) Chris Smith	(Scotland) Stenhousemuir	Free
(Estonia) Sander Puri	(England) York City	Free
(Scotland) Grant Adam	(Scotland) Cowdenbeath	Free
(England) Sam Parkin	(England) Exeter City	Free
(Scotland) Dougie Imrie	(Scotland) Greenock Morton	Free
(England) Lewis Guy	(England) Carlisle United	Free
(Republic of Ireland) Graham Carey	(Scotland) Ross County	Free
(Scotland) Jon Robertson	(Scotland) Cowdenbeath	Free
(Republic of Ireland) Kealan Dillon	Free agent	Free
(Scotland) Gary Harkins	(England) Oldham Athletic	Loan
(Scotland) Lee Mair	(Scotland) Partick Thistle	Free
(Scotland) David Barron	Free agent	Free
(England) Danny Grainger	(Scotland) Dunfermline Athletic	Free

== See also ==
- List of St Mirren F.C. seasons
