= Jamie McKernon =

Scottish footballer

Personal information
- Date of birth: 1 April 1992 (age 34)
- Place of birth: Irvine, Scotland
- Position: Midfielder

Team information
- Current team: Troon

Senior career*
Years	Team	Apps	(Gls)
2004–2013	St Mirren	2	(0)
2011-2012	→ Ayr United (loan)	20	(0)
2012–2013	→ East Stirlingshire (loan)	13	(0)
2013–2015	Glenafton Athletic	59	(17)
2015–2017	Queen's Park	54	(5)
2017–2018	Glenafton Athletic	35	(2)
2018–2019	Queen's Park	41	(2)
2019	Stenhousemuir	11	(0)
2019–2021	Darvel		
2021	Albion Rovers	24	(0)
2021–2023	Glenafton Athletic	21	(4)
2023–	Troon		
- * Club domestic league appearances and goals as of 11:23, 27 February 2023 (UTC)

Jamie McKernon (born 1 April 1992) is a Scottish footballer who plays for Troon. He has previously played in the Scottish Premier League for St Mirren.

== Career ==
On 22 August 2010, McKernon made his first team debut for St Mirren as a substitute against Celtic, coming on for Garry Brady in a 4–0 defeat. This was followed up with another substitute appearance against St Johnstone on 14 May 2011. In the subsequent seasons he was sent on loan to Scottish Football League sides Ayr United and East Stirlingshire.

Jamie had his contract with St Mirren terminated by mutual consent on 13 March 2013. He joined Junior side Glenafton Athletic in August 2013 under Manager Tommy Bryce and helped the New Cumnock club reach the Scottish Junior Cup final in 2014 before lifting the Ardagh Cup in 2014–15.

McKernon stepped back up to Scottish League One side Queen's Park in the summer of 2015 spending two seasons at Hampden Park. He re-joined Glenafton in the summer of 2018 under Craig McEwan, before again returning to Queens Park the following summer. Brown Ferguson signed McKernon for Stenhousemuir in the summer of 2019, before he returned to the Junior leagues to join the ambitious Darvel in October 2019.

In March 2021, McKernon joined Scottish League Two side Albion Rovers before returning to Glenafton for a third spell in November 2021 under his former team-mate Mick McCann.

McKernon joined WOSFL Premier Division side Troon in February 2023.

== Career statistics ==
As of 14 October 2014

Appearances and goals by club, season and competition
Club	Season	League		Scottish Cup		League Cup		Other		Total	
Club	Season	Apps	Goals	Apps	Goals	Apps	Goals	Apps	Goals	Apps	Goals
St Mirren	2010–11	2	0	0	0	0	0	0	0	2	0
St Mirren	2011–12	0	0	0	0	0	0	0	0	0	0
St Mirren	2012–13	0	0	0	0	0	0	0	0	0	0
Ayr United (loan)	2011–12	20	0	4	0	3	0	3	1	30	1
East Stirlingshire (loan)	2012–13	13	0	0	0	0	0	0	0	13	0
Career total		35	0	4	0	3	0	3	1	45	1
