= Sean Kelly (Scottish footballer) =

Scottish footballer (born 1993)

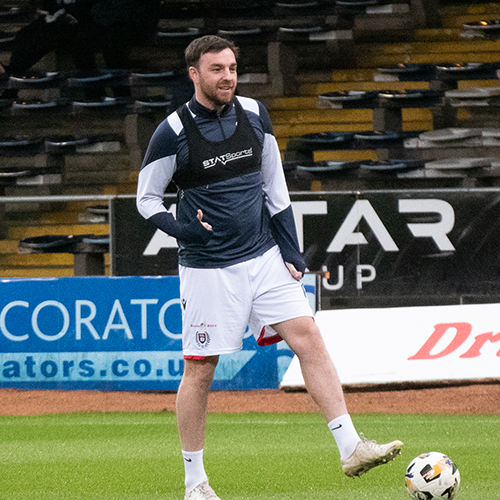
- Kelly in 2024 with Dundee

Personal information
- Date of birth: 1 November 1993 (age 33)
- Place of birth: Glasgow, Scotland
- Height: 1.88 m (6 ft 2 in)
- Positions: Centre-back; left back

Team information
- Current team: Boeung Ket
- Number: 31

Senior career*
Years	Team	Apps	(Gls)
2012–2016	St Mirren	90	(6)
2012	→ East Stirlingshire (loan)	10	(0)
2016–2017	AFC Wimbledon	26	(2)
2017–2020	Ross County	51	(1)
2020–2021	Falkirk	14	(0)
2021–2024	Livingston	68	(6)
2024	Karmiotissa		
2024–2025	Dundee	3	(0)
2025	Partick Thistle	5	(0)
2025–	Boeung Ket	35	(1)

International career
2014	Scotland U21	1	(0)
- * Club domestic league appearances and goals as of 9 November 2026 (UTC)

Sean Kelly (born 1 November 1993) is a Scottish professional footballer who plays as a centre-back and full back for Cambodian Premier League club Boeung Ket.

== Career ==
Kelly began his career with St Mirren and made his professional debut on 3 August 2013 in a 3–0 defeat against Inverness Caledonian Thistle. On 22 November 2013 it was announced that Kelly had signed a two-year contract extension with Saints, tying him to the club until the summer of 2016. On 5 March 2014, Kelly appeared for the Scotland under-21 side in a 2–2 draw against Hungary at Tannadice. Kelly was released by St Mirren at the end of the 2015–16 season.

Kelly went on trial with AFC Wimbledon during the 2016–17 pre-season, and permanently signed for the club on 1 August 2016. Kelly scored his first goal for the Dons on 14 January, in a 2–1 win against Oxford United.

He returned to Scottish football in June 2017, signing for Ross County. Kelly was released by Ross County after the end of the 2019–20 season.

Kelly signed for Falkirk in October 2020.

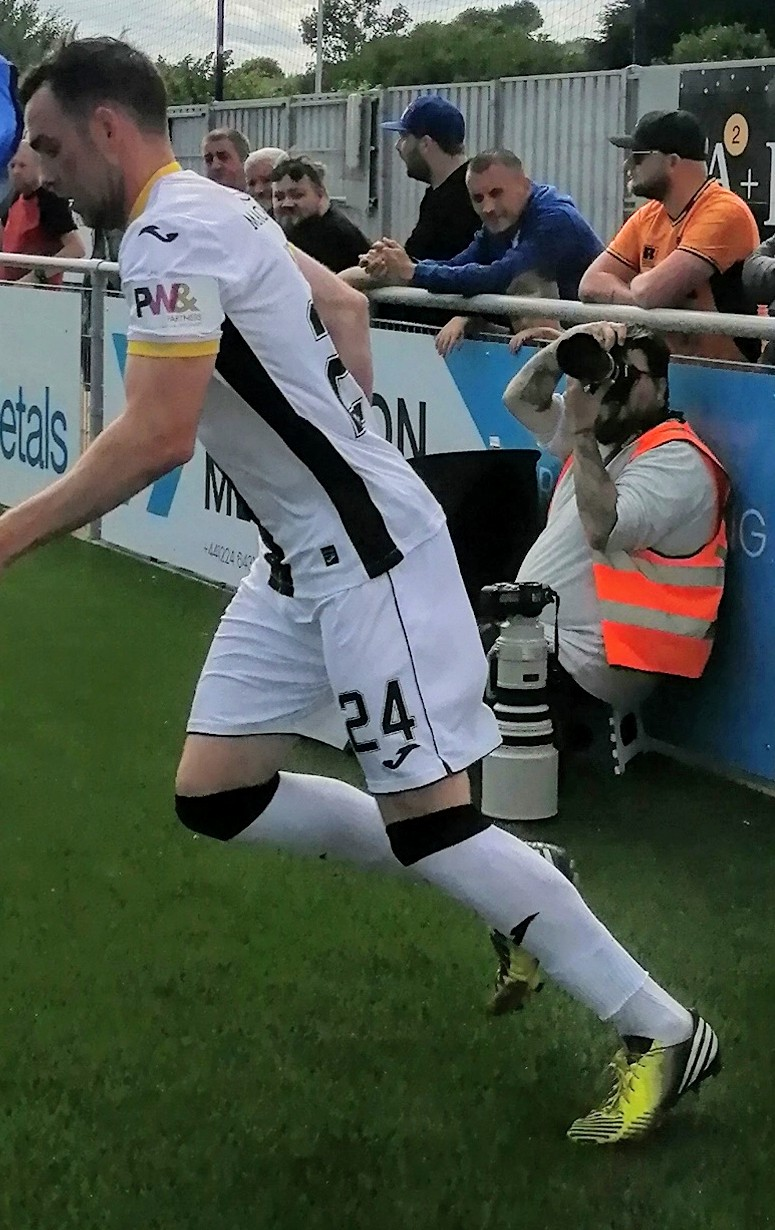
Kelly playing for Livingston

On 21 July 2021, Kelly joined Scottish Premiership side Livingston on an initial one-year contract. He signed a one-year contract extension with Livingston on 20 May 2022.

In July 2024, Kelly joined Cypriot First Division club Karmiotissa.

After leaving Cyprus as a free agent having not played a game for Karmiotissa, Kelly returned to Scotland and signed a short-term deal with Scottish Premiership club Dundee on 28 November 2024, running until 2 January 2025. On 4 December, Kelly made his debut for the Dark Blues as a substitute in a home win over Motherwell. On 4 January 2025, Dundee confirmed that Kelly's deal had ended after making 3 appearances for the club.

On 27 February 2025, Kelly joined Scottish Championship club Partick Thistle on a short-term deal until the end of the season. On 11 March, Kelly made his debut for the Jags off the bench in an away league victory against Queen's Park. On 4 June, Thistle confirmed that Kelly had left the club.

On 5 July 2025, Kelly joined Cambodian Premier League club Boeung Ket on a permanent deal.

== Personal life ==
He is the elder brother of Rangers goalkeeper Liam Kelly. In October 2023 the siblings faced each other from 12 yards in a Scottish Premiership fixture, with Sean scoring his penalty past Liam.

== Career statistics ==
As of 3 May 2026

Appearances and goals by club, season and competition
Club	Season	League			Cup		League Cup		Other		Total	
Club	Season	Division	Apps	Goals	Apps	Goals	Apps	Goals	Apps	Goals	Apps	Goals
St Mirren	2012–13	Scottish Premier League	0	0	0	0	0	0	—		0	0
St Mirren	2013–14	Scottish Premiership	33	1	3	1	0	0	—		36	2
St Mirren	2014–15	Scottish Premiership	31	3	2	0	1	0	—		34	3
St Mirren	2015–16	Scottish Championship	26	2	1	0	1	0	4 (Note: Appearances in the Scottish Challenge Cup)	0	32	2
St Mirren	Total		90	6	6	1	2	0	4	0	102	7
East Stirlingshire (loan)	2012–13	Scottish Third Division	10	0	0	0	0	0	0	0	10	0
AFC Wimbledon	2016–17	League One	26	2	2	0	1	0	3 (Note: Appearances in the EFL Trophy)	0	32	2
Ross County	2017–18	Scottish Premiership	13	0	0	0	5	0	—		18	0
Ross County	2018–19	Scottish Championship	20	1	1	0	5	0	1	0	27	1
Ross County	2019–20	Scottish Premiership	18	0	1	0	4	0	—		23	0
Ross County	Total		51	1	2	0	14	0	1	0	68	1
Falkirk	2020–21	Scottish League One	14	0	0	0	2	0	—		16	0
Livingston	2021–22	Scottish Premiership	15	0	1	0	2	0	—		18	0
Livingston	2022–23	Scottish Premiership	30	2	0	0	4	1	—		34	3
Livingston	2023–24	Scottish Premiership	23	4	2	0	2	1	—		27	5
Livingston	Total		68	6	3	0	8	2	0	0	79	8
Karmiotissa	2024–25	Cypriot First Division	0	0	0	0	0	0	0	0	0	0
Dundee	2024–25	Scottish Premiership	3	0	0	0	—		—		3	0
Partick Thistle	2024–25	Scottish Championship	5	0	—		—		0	0	5	0
Boeung Ket	2025–26	Cambodian Premier League	27	1	0	0	0	0	0	0	27	1
Total			270	16	13	1	24	2	8	0	325	19

== Honours ==
Ross County

- Scottish Championship: 2018–19
- Scottish Challenge Cup: 2018–19
