= Conor Newton =

English footballer

Personal information
- Full name: Conor Newton
- Date of birth: 17 October 1991 (age 35)
- Place of birth: Whickham, England
- Height: 1.81 m (5 ft 11 1/2 in)
- Position: Midfielder

Youth career
- 2001–2008: Newcastle United

Senior career*
Years	Team	Apps	(Gls)
2008–2014	Newcastle United	0	(0)
2013	→ St Mirren (loan)	16	(3)
2013–2014	→ St Mirren (loan)	37	(5)
2014–2015	Rotherham United	13	(0)
2015–2017	Cambridge United	49	(1)
2017–2019	Hartlepool United	40	(3)
2019–2022	Whickham	14	(0)
2022–2023	South Shields	13	(0)
Total		182	(11)
- * Club domestic league appearances and goals

Conor Newton (born 17 October 1991) is an English semi-professional and former professional footballer who played as a central midfielder or right back.

== Club career ==
=== Newcastle United ===
Newton joined Newcastle United as a youth player at the age of nine and made his debut for their reserve side in 2008 against Blackburn. Following nine months out with a knee injury he looked to go out on loan to gain first team experience. In January 2013, he joined Scottish side St Mirren on loan.

Following his loan spell at St.Mirren, Newton, along with Dummett, both signed a one-year extension.

=== St Mirren (loan) ===
After a spell training with the club on 1 January 2013, he joined Scottish Premier League side St Mirren on loan until the end of the season.

At St Mirren, he teamed up with fellow Newcastle player Paul Dummett and was given the squad number twenty four, where he was an un-used substitute, in a 1–1 draw against Kilmarnock. Newton made his debut playing from the start on 19 January, in a 4–1 home defeat to Ross County.

Newton's first goal for the club came in the Scottish Communities League Cup final against Hearts on 17 March 2013, when he collected his first senior medal following St Mirren's 3–2 win. Following the match, Newton says his first major final was a good one and playing in the cup final is such an honour. In addition, Newton says his thoughts about the goal:

It's replayed over in my mind quite a few times. Looking back on it, I definitely think I could have played it differently. In the heat of the battle, you don't really think but when you step back and look at it, then you can see it differently. Watching it again, I think I probably should have taken a touch and tried to slip it past the keeper. But when it came to me, I just thought 'I'm going to hit this', and luckily it fired into the net. When I was back down in Newcastle last week, a lot of my mates had it on their phones, constantly showing me it again and again. I was just lucky enough to be played through one-on-one and for the ball to go in after I struck it. It means so much to score the goal that proved to be the winner.

A week later, on 6 April 2013, Newton scored his first league goal, in a 2–2 draw against Motherwell, which was the last match before its split. His second goal came up on the final game of the season and provided assist for John McGinn, who scored the opener in the match, as St Mirren would win 3–1 against Kilmarnock.

In the 2013–14 season, Newton returned to St Mirren on loan in his second spell. After making twelve appearances, Newton scored his first goal in his second spell in a 2–1 win over Ross County and followed the second the following week, in a 3–0 win over Partick Thistle. In January, Newton loan spell was extended until the end of the season, making this his first full season at St Mirren.

Newton was a first team regular for the club, and made 41 appearances over the course of the season. The midfielder weighed in with five goals, scoring in his final match against Hearts on 10 May 2014 before his loan spell finished.

=== Rotherham United ===
At the end of the 2013–14 season, Newcastle United did not offer Newton a new contract and he joined Rotherham United on a two-year deal.

=== Cambridge United ===
On 16 July 2015 he signed a two-year deal with Cambridge United and was allowed to leave after his contract expired.

=== Hartlepool United ===
Newton moved back to the North-East signing for National League club Hartlepool United in July 2017. Newton scored his first goal for Pools in November 2017 in a 4–0 win against FC Halifax Town. Newton made 27 league appearances in his first season with the club. At the end of the 2017–18 season, Newton was transfer listed by the club along with six other players. Newton was released by Hartlepool at the end of the 2018–19 season.

=== Move into semi-professional football ===
In June 2019, following Newton's release from Hartlepool, he joined Northern League Division One side Whickham on a two-year contract.

=== South Shields ===
In August 2022, following a successful trial at Northern Premier League club South Shields, Newton signed a contract ahead of the 2022–23 season until January 2023. Upon signing for Shields, Newton said "I've been out of full-time football for a long time but was given the opportunity to come in and train with the lads and it's hard not to enjoy the facilities here and the standards throughout the club." He made his debut for Shields on 13 August 2022 in a 2–0 win against Stalybridge Celtic. On 13 December 2022, it was announced that Newton would be unavailable for selection by the club for the foreseeable future for personal reasons. He quit football to run his own gym which operates in Dunston, Tyne and Wear.

== Personal life ==
Newton grew up in Whickham, England where he attended Whickham Comprehensive School, until 2008.

== Career statistics ==
Appearances and goals by club, season and competition
Club	Season	League			FA Cup		League Cup		Other		Total	
Club	Season	Division	Apps	Goals	Apps	Goals	Apps	Goals	Apps	Goals	Apps	Goals
Newcastle United	2012–13	Premier League	0	0	0	0	0	0	0	0	0	0
Newcastle United	2013–14	Premier League	0	0	0	0	0	0	0	0	0	0
St Mirren (loan)	2012–13	Scottish Premier League	16	2	2	0	1	0	0	0	19	2
St Mirren (loan)	2013–14	Scottish Premier League	37	4	3	1	1	0	0	0	41	5
St Mirren (loan)	Total		53	6	5	1	2	0	0	0	60	7
Rotherham United	2014–15	Championship	13	0	0	0	1	0	0	0	14	0
Cambridge United	2015–16	League Two	22	0	2	0	1	0	1 (Note: Appearance(s) in Football League Trophy)	0	26	0
Cambridge United	2016–17	League Two	27	1	1	0	2	0	2 (Note: Appearance(s) in EFL Trophy)	0	32	1
Cambridge United	Total		49	1	3	0	3	0	3	0	58	1
Hartlepool United	2017–18	National League	27	4	0	0	0	0	1 (Note: Appearance(s) in FA Trophy)	0	28	4
Hartlepool United	2018–19	National League	13	0	2	0	0	0	0	0	15	0
Hartlepool United	Total		40	4	2	0	0	0	1	0	43	4
South Shields	2022–23	NPL Premier Division	13	0	5	0	0	0	0	0	18	0
Career total			168	11	15	1	6	0	4	0	193	12

== Honours ==
St Mirren

- Scottish League Cup: 2012–13

South Shields

- Northern Premier League: 2022–23
