= Marián Kello =

Slovak footballer

Personal information
- Full name: Marián Kello
- Date of birth: 5 September 1982 (age 44)
- Place of birth: Gelnica, Czechoslovakia
- Height: 1.88 m (6 ft 2 in)
- Position: Goalkeeper

Youth career
- 1. FC Košice

Senior career*
| Years | Team | Apps | (Gls) |
| 2001–2002 | 1. FC Košice | 1 | (0) |
| 2002–2006 | FC Vítkovice | 88 | (0) |
| 2007–2008 | FBK Kaunas | 28 | (0) |
| 2008–2012 | Heart of Midlothian | 79 | (0) |
| 2012 | Astra Giurgiu | 2 | (0) |
| 2013 | Wolverhampton Wanderers | 0 | (0) |
| 2013–2015 | St Mirren | 36 | (0) |
| 2015 | Aris Limassol | 2 | (0) |
| 2016–2017 | VSS Košice | 3 | (0) |
| 2017–2018 | MFK Ťahanovce | 21 | (?) |
| 2019 | FC Košice | 0 | (0) |

International career^{‡}
| 2011 | Slovakia | 3 | (0) |

Managerial career
- 2019–2026: FC Košice (goalkeeping coach)
- 2026-: KFC Komárno (goalkeeping coach)
- * Club domestic league appearances and goals as of 29 June 2017 ‡ National team caps and goals as of 29 June 2013

Marián Kello (born 5 September 1982) is a Slovak former international footballer who played as a goalkeeper. Kello played for 1. FC Košice, FC Vítkovice, FBK Kaunas, Heart of Midlothian, Astra Giurgiu, Wolverhampton Wanderers, St Mirren, Aris Limassol and has represented Slovakia.

== Club career ==
He began his career at Slovak side 1. FC Košice in 2001, where he spent a year of his career before moving to Czech side, FC Vítkovice at the age of 19. After a four-year spell with Vítkovice, he moved to Lithuanian champions FBK Kaunas. He became first choice goalkeeper for Kaunas with his impressive displays against Scottish side, Rangers and Danish champions AaB Aalborg which helped earn him a move to Hearts.

=== Hearts ===
On 14 August 2008 Kello joined Hearts on loan from Kaunas. He made his debut on 23 August 2008 in a 2–1 victory against St Mirren at Tynecastle. He maintained his place in the team until the Edinburgh Derby on 19 October 2008 when he suffered a head injury in a clash with Hibs striker Colin Nish and had to be replaced by János Balogh at half-time. He subsequently lost his place in the team to the Hungarian and made only two further appearances before the split. He returned to the team for Hearts' final six games of the season and conceded only three goals as the Jambos secured third place in the league and a place in the inaugural UEFA Europa League. Kello saved a Danny Cadamarteri penalty in a 0–0 draw with Dundee United on 12 December 2009.

On 2 August 2010, Hearts announced he had signed a two-year deal with the club, after his contract at FBK Kaunas expired. The 2009–10 season saw Kello entrenched in a three-way battle to be first-choice goalkeeper with Balogh and Jamie MacDonald with Balogh narrowly making the most appearance over the course of the season.

He went on to establish himself as Hearts' first-choice goalkeeper during the 2010–11 season. On 2 October 2010 Kello turned in a heroic performance against Rangers only for Hearts to succumb to a stoppage time goal from Steven Naismith in a 2–1 loss at Tynecastle. His save to deny Steven Davis in this match was voted Save of the Season at the SPL end of season awards.

On 20 November Kello paid tribute to legendary Hearts goalkeeper Jim Cruickshank, who had died two days earlier, by tying a goalkeeper shirt with Cruickshank's name and number printed on the back in the net of his goal. Hearts defeated Hamilton 2–0 with Kello saving a Simon Mensing penalty. After the match manager Jim Jefferies praised Kello saying "Jim Cruickshank was a great penalty saver. How fitting is it that Marian comes out with the jersey and makes a fantastic save from a penalty on the day we paid our respects to him?" He once again produced his best form against Rangers as he made a string of saves to keep a clean sheet in a 1–0 victory at Tynecastle which saw Hearts keep pace with the Old Firm at the summit of the table. His impressive form continued as he saved a stoppage time penalty from David Goodwillie to preserve a 2–1 win against Dundee United as Hearts extended their lead in third place in the league. This along with other impressive performances saw him awarded the SPL Player of the Month award for February 2011. He picked up three awards at Hearts' end of season awards winning the Hearts' Player of the Season, Save of the Season and Fans' Player of the Season awards.

Following the dismissal of Jefferies as manager at the start of the 2011–12 season and appointment of Paulo Sérgio Kello continued as first-choice goalkeeper. On 31 January 2011, the last day of the winter transfer window, it was rumoured that Hearts had agreed a deal with Austria Wien for Kello only for him to turn down the transfer. He missed the Scottish Cup tie against St Johnstone the following weekend, it was originally reported his absence was due to a back injury. However, after the match manager Paulo Sérgio revealed that the goalkeeper's exclusion was "a political thing" and that he was instructed to drop him. Two days later Kello confirmed that he had turned down the Austria Wien transfer and that Celtic had also expressed an interest in him. With his contract set to expire in June 2012 he also revealed that he would not be signing a new contract with Hearts thus confirming that he would depart the club at the end of the season.

With interest from Aston Villa and other English clubs to sign a pre-contract agreement, on 5 April 2012 Kello agreed to an early termination to his Hearts contract. After being released by the club Kello joined Ipswich Town on trial. He featured in two pre-season friendlies as a trialist but, despite impressing manager Paul Jewell, a permanent move was ruled out. He then joined Wolverhampton Wanderers on trial and played the full match in a pre-season friendly against AFC Telford United in a 2–0 victory but again no permanent deal was agreed.

=== Astra Giurgiu ===
Kello joined Romanian Liga I club Astra Giurgiu after having a trial for ten days He made his debut for the club on 5 October 2012 in a 1–1 home draw with FC Vaslui. With Romanian international Silviu Lung Jr. firmly established as first-choice goalkeeper Kello made only two appearances before being released by the club in December.

=== Wolves ===
On 28 March 2013 Kello signed for English Championship club Wolverhampton Wanderers in a short-term deal until the end of the 2012–13 season as cover for their injured goalkeepers Wayne Hennessey and Carl Ikeme. The club however also recalled youth goalkeeper Aaron McCarey, who instead acted as substitute goalkeeper for the remainder of the season as the team unsuccessfully battled relegation.

=== St Mirren ===
Kello signed a short-term contract with Scottish Premiership club St Mirren in October 2013.

He made his debut for the club on 26 October against Dundee United at Tannadice Park, a game that finished 4–0 to the home side. After the match, Manager Danny Lennon quoted on his debut: "I felt sorry for Marian Kello in goal for us on his debut but he actually made some good saves so it's just a case of trying to forget about this one." The next match on 9 November 2013, Kello got his first clean sheet in a 3–0 victory over Partick Thistle. Since a 3–0 win over Partick Thistle, Kello added two more clean sheets in the league and established himself as a first-choice goalkeeper for the club. Manager Lennon expressed interest to extend Kello contract to stay at the club.

On 31 December 2013, it was announced that Kello had extended his deal to stay at St Mirren, until at least the summer of 2014. In a match against St Johnstone, Kello sustained an injury and was substituted for Christopher Dilo, which St Mirren lost 1–0 and this was Kello's appearance of the season. Kello sustained a groin injury and was out for a week. Though Kello returned to the squad, Kello remained as a substitute goalkeeper for the rest of the season. At the end of the season, Kello was offered a new contract with the club. During the negotiations, Kello was linked with a move return to Hearts, under new management. Nevertheless, Kello signed a one-year contract extension with the club, keeping him at the club until the summer of 2015.

Kello failed to hold down a regular first-team place in the 2014–15 season, making 17 appearances. On 29 May 2015 he was released by the club, having made 41 appearances in a two-season stay.

=== Aris Limassol ===
In June 2015, Kello signed for Aris Limassol who play in the Cypriot First Division.

=== MFK Tahanovce ===
On 20 August 2017, Kello was an unused sub for MFK Tahanovce.

== International career ==
Kello's impressive form for Hearts in early 2011 saw him called up to the Slovakia squad and he made his international debut on 9 February 2011, as a substitute against Luxembourg in a 2–1 defeat.

== Career statistics ==
| Club | Season | League | | Cup | | League Cup | | Europe | | Total | |
| Club | Season | Apps | Goals | Apps | Goals | Apps | Goals | Apps | Goals | Apps | Goals |
|---|---|---|---|---|---|---|---|---|---|---|---|
| Hearts | 2008–09 | 13 | 0 | 0 | 0 | 1 | 0 | 0 | 0 | 14 | 0 |
| Hearts | 2009–10 | 14 | 0 | 1 | 0 | 1 | 0 | 1 | 0 | 17 | 0 |
| Hearts | 2010–11 | 31 | 0 | 0 | 0 | 1 | 0 | 0 | 0 | 32 | 0 |
| Hearts | 2011–12 | 20 | 0 | 0 | 0 | 0 | 0 | 3 | 0 | 23 | 0 |
| Total | | 78 | 0 | 1 | 0 | 3 | 0 | 4 | 0 | 86 | 0 |
| Astra Giurgiu | 2012–13 | 2 | 0 | 0 | 0 | 0 | 0 | - | - | 2 | 0 |
| Total | | 2 | 0 | 0 | 0 | 0 | 0 | - | - | 2 | 0 |
| Wolverhampton Wanderers | 2012–13 | 0 | 0 | 0 | 0 | 0 | 0 | 0 | 0 | 0 | 0 |
| Total | | 0 | 0 | 0 | 0 | 0 | 0 | 0 | 0 | 0 | 0 |
| St Mirren | 2013–14 | 21 | 0 | 3 | 0 | 0 | 0 | 0 | 0 | 24 | 0 |
| St Mirren | 2014–15 | 15 | 0 | 0 | 0 | 2 | 0 | 0 | 0 | 17 | 0 |
| Total | | 36 | 0 | 3 | 0 | 2 | 0 | 0 | 0 | 41 | 0 |
| Career total | | 116 | 0 | 4 | 0 | 5 | 0 | 4 | 0 | 129 | 0 |

== Honours ==
=== Club ===
FBK Kaunas

- A Lyga: 2007
- Lithuanian Cup: 2008
- Lithuanian Super Cup: 2007

=== Individual ===
- Scottish Premier League Player of the Month: February 2011
- Scottish Premier League Save of the season: 2010–2011
