= Paul Dummett =

Wales international footballer

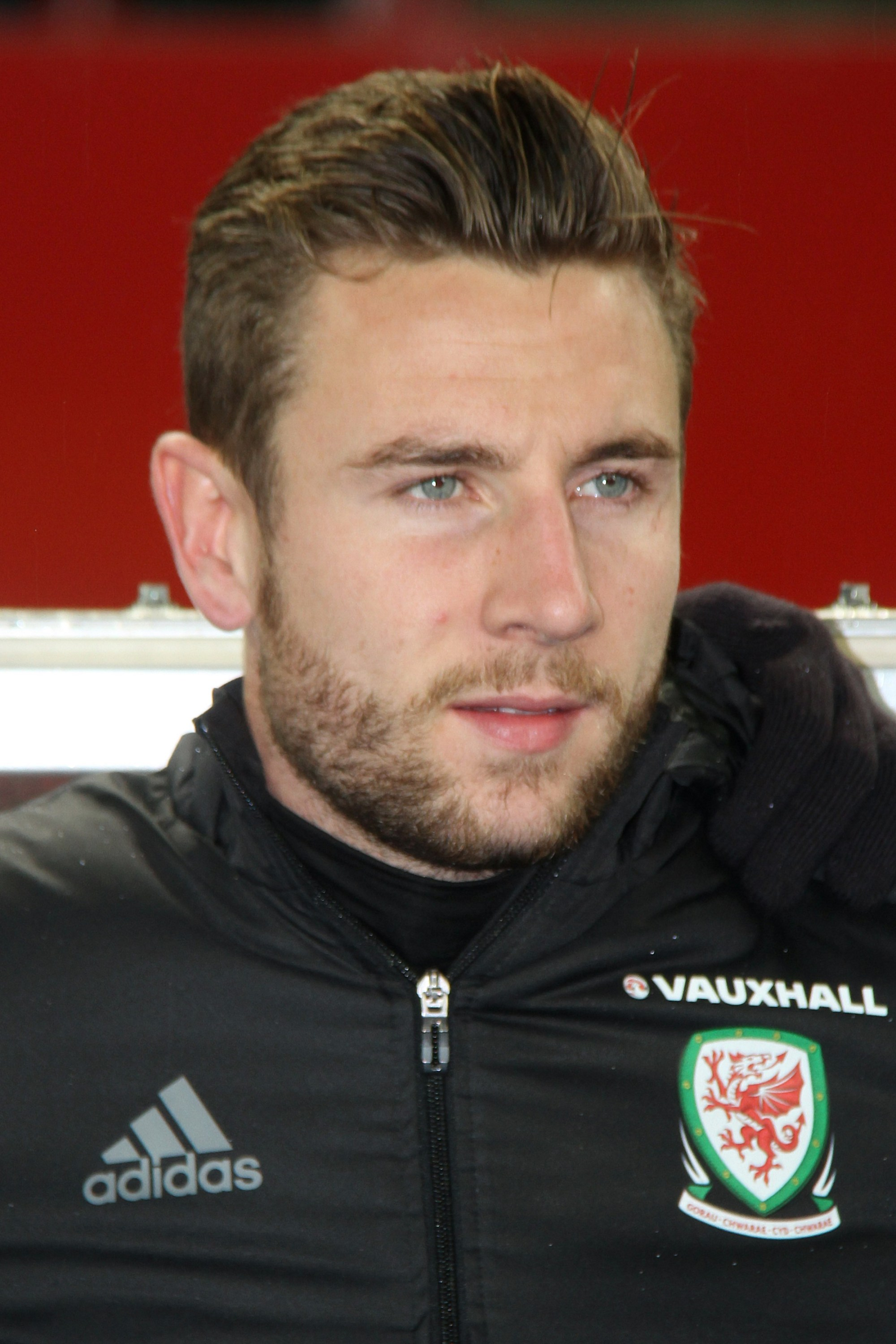
- Dummett with Wales in 2016

Personal information
- Full name: Paul Dummett
- Date of birth: 26 September 1991 (age 35)
- Place of birth: Newcastle upon Tyne, England
- Height: 6 ft 0 in (1.83 m)
- Positions: Centre-back; left-back

Youth career
- 2000–2012: Newcastle United

Senior career*
Years	Team	Apps	(Gls)
2010–2024	Newcastle United	196	(3)
2012	→ Gateshead (loan)	10	(0)
2012–2013	→ St Mirren (loan)	30	(2)
2024–2025	Wigan Athletic	3	(0)
2025	Carlisle United	3	(0)
Total		242	(5)

International career
2011–2012	Wales U21	4	(0)
2014–2019	Wales	5	(0)
- * Club domestic league appearances and goals

Paul Dummett (born 26 September 1991) is a former professional footballer who played as a defender. Born in England, he played for the Wales national team. Mainly a centre-back, he also played as a left-back.

Dummett began his career with his local side Newcastle United. After progressing through the youth ranks at the club, he had loan spells at Gateshead and Scottish side St Mirren. He made his Premier League debut in the 2013–14 season and scored his first Premier League goal against Liverpool on 19 October 2013. In the summer of 2024, Dummett left his boyhood club for Wigan Athletic, before signing for Carlisle United in January 2025.

On 4 December 2025, Dummett retired as a footballer at the age of 34.

== Club career ==
=== Newcastle United ===
Dummett started his career in the Newcastle United youth system, captaining the club's reserve team on several occasions.

==== Loan to Gateshead ====
Dummett joined Conference National side Gateshead in March 2012, initially for a month-long loan, which was then extended until the end of the season, helping the team keep six clean sheets from ten matches.

==== Loans to St Mirren ====
The following season he was loaned to Scottish Premier League club St Mirren. Dummett made his debut in a 2–0 win over Hearts on 15 September 2012, and scored his first senior goal in a 1–1 draw against St Johnstone.

After returning from his loan spell at St Mirren, Dummett made his debut senior appearance for Newcastle in an FA Cup tie away defeat to Brighton & Hove Albion on 5 January 2013. After the match, Dummett spoke out on his debut, that his Newcastle United debut was a dream come true. He then rejoined St Mirren on 31 January 2013 on loan for the rest of the season. Dummett played the full game for St Mirren in their Scottish League Cup final 3–2 win over Hearts, the club's first major cup for 26 years. Dummett also set up the second St Mirren goal in the 46th minute, for Steven Thompson, which put the Saints 2–1 up.

==== Return to Newcastle United ====
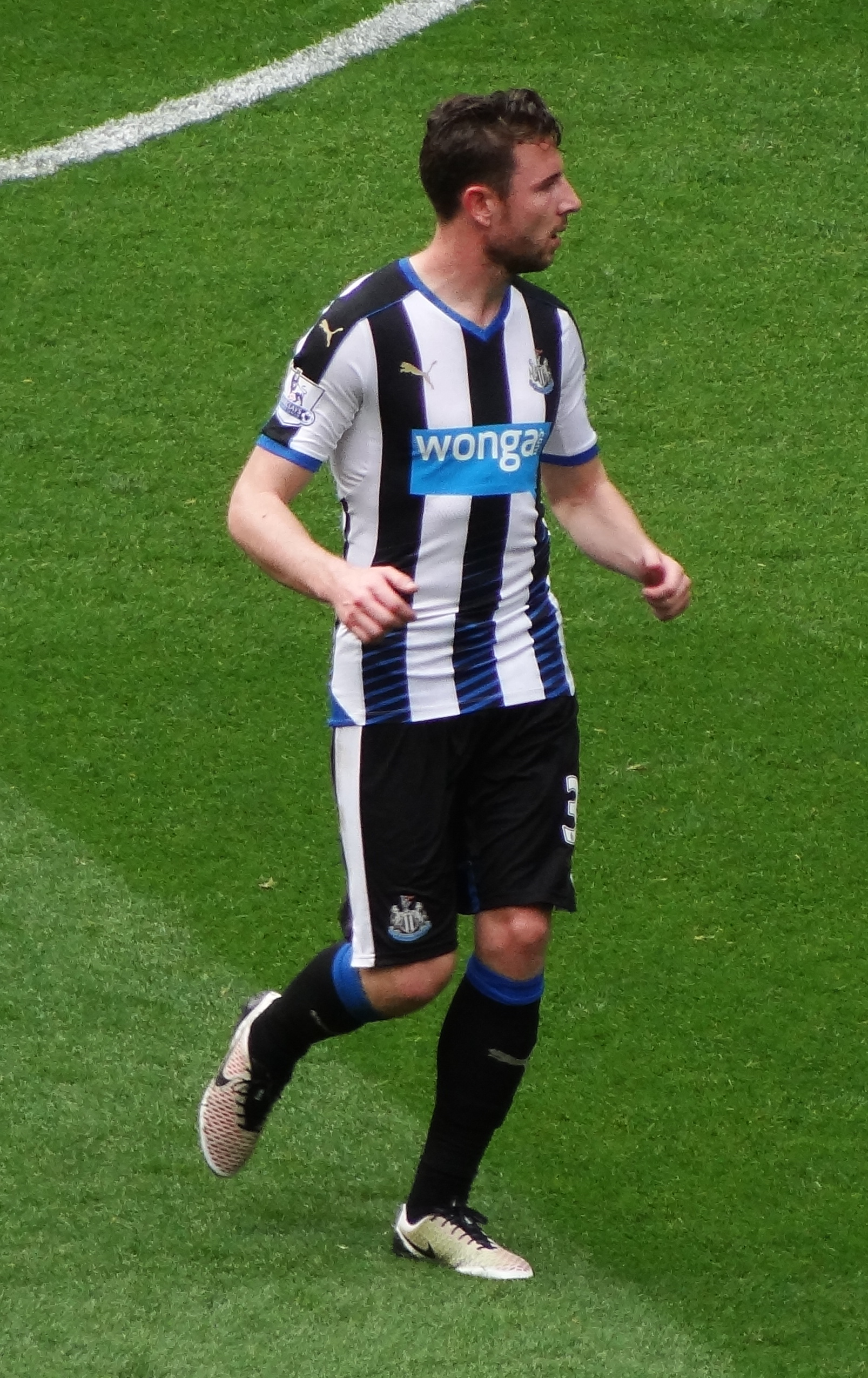
Dummett playing for Newcastle in 2016

Dummett returned to Newcastle, and signed a one-year contract extension. He made his debut for the club as a substitute during a 4–0 defeat to Manchester City on the opening fixture of the 2013–14 season, coming on after a sending off of fellow defender Steven Taylor and playing the full second half of the game. He scored his first goal for Newcastle in a 2–2 draw at home to Liverpool in October 2013. Just weeks after scoring his goal for the club, Dummett put pen-to-paper on a new contract at Newcastle, signing a deal that could extend until 2019.

On the final day of the season, Dummett made a challenge on Liverpool forward Luis Suárez. Due to knee surgery which jeopardised Suárez's chances of playing at the 2014 FIFA World Cup, fans in his native Uruguay sent online death threats to Dummett.

Dummett started the 2014–15 season as Newcastle's first-choice left back, with Davide Santon injured and Massadio Haïdara on the bench. Dummett grabbed his second Magpies goal on 25 September 2014, scoring a late winner in extra-time against Crystal Palace in the League Cup. Playing alongside captain Fabricio Coloccini in the centre of defence, Dummett helped Newcastle keep clean sheets in victories over Manchester City and West Bromwich Albion. On 12 January 2016, Dummett scored a 90th-minute equaliser against Manchester United in a match that ended in a 3–3 draw at St James' Park. Since 2017, Dummett has often been deployed as a centre back, as well as left back.

On 8 May 2021, He scored his first goal in five years in a 4–2 away win against Leicester City. On 5 May 2022, Dummett signed a new one-year contract extension with the club and on 9 July 2023, the club announced he had agreed another one-year extension. On 29 May 2024, Newcastle announced that Dummett would be leaving the club after the expiry of his contract, due to run out on July the same year.

=== Wigan Athletic ===
On 8 November 2024, it was announced that Dummett had joined League One side Wigan Athletic on a short-term contract.

=== Carlisle United ===
On 10 January 2025, following the expiry of his contract with Wigan, Dummett joined League Two bottom side Carlisle United on a short-term deal until the end of the season. He made his debut for the club against Fleetwood Town in a 2–1 victory, but was substituted within 5 minutes due to injury.

=== Retirement ===
On 4 December 2025, Dummett announced his retirement from professional football.

== International career ==
Dummett qualifies to play for Wales through his Welsh grandfather. He was capped at under-21 level for Wales. He made his senior debut for Wales in the match against the Netherlands on 4 June 2014, coming in as a substitute in the 83rd minute. Dummett played his second international match on 13 November 2015, again against the Netherlands, coming on for Neil Taylor in 65th minute. In May 2016, Dummett was listed for the 29-man squad for a pre-Euro 2016 training camp. However, Dummett was among six players to be cut for the Euro 2016 squad. In May 2017, Wales manager Chris Coleman said that Dummett would no longer make himself available for international selection. He was recalled to the national team in August 2018, before making himself unavailable again in August 2019, seemingly ending his international career.

== Career statistics ==
=== Club ===
As of match played 3 May 2025

Appearances and goals by club, season and competition
Club	Season	League			National cup (Note: Includes Scottish Cup, FA Cup)		League cup (Note: Includes Scottish League Cup, EFL Cup)		Other		Total	
Club	Season	Division	Apps	Goals	Apps	Goals	Apps	Goals	Apps	Goals	Apps	Goals
Gateshead (loan)	2011–12	Conference Premier	10	0	0	0	–		0	0	10	0
St Mirren (loan)	2012–13	Scottish Premier League	30	2	3	0	3	0	0	0	36	2
Newcastle United	2012–13	Premier League	0	0	1	0	0	0	0	0	1	0
Newcastle United	2013–14	Premier League	18	1	0	0	3	0	0	0	21	1
Newcastle United	2014–15	Premier League	25	0	1	0	3	1	0	0	29	1
Newcastle United	2015–16	Premier League	23	1	1	0	0	0	0	0	24	1
Newcastle United	2016–17	Championship	45	0	0	0	1	0	0	0	46	0
Newcastle United	2017–18	Premier League	20	0	1	0	0	0	0	0	21	0
Newcastle United	2018–19	Premier League	26	0	0	0	0	0	0	0	26	0
Newcastle United	2019–20	Premier League	16	0	0	0	1	0	0	0	17	0
Newcastle United	2020–21	Premier League	15	1	1	0	0	0	0	0	16	1
Newcastle United	2021–22	Premier League	3	0	0	0	0	0	0	0	3	0
Newcastle United	2022–23	Premier League	0	0	0	0	1	0	0	0	1	0
Newcastle United	2023–24	Premier League	5	0	1	0	2	0	0	0	8	0
Newcastle United	Total		196	3	6	0	11	1	0	0	213	4
Wigan Athletic	2024–25	League One	3	0	0	0	0	0	2 (Note: Appearances in EFL Trophy)	0	5	0
Carlisle United	2024–25	League Two	3	0	0	0	0	0	0	0	3	0
Career total			242	5	9	0	14	1	2	0	267	6

=== International ===
Appearances and goals by national team and year
National team	Year	Apps	Goals
Wales	2014	1	0
Wales	2015	1	0
Wales	2018	2	0
Wales	2019	1	0
Total		5	0

== Honours ==
St Mirren

- Scottish League Cup: 2012–13

Newcastle United

- EFL Championship: 2016–17

== See also ==
- List of Wales international footballers born outside Wales
