= Christopher Dilo =

Association football player (born 1994)

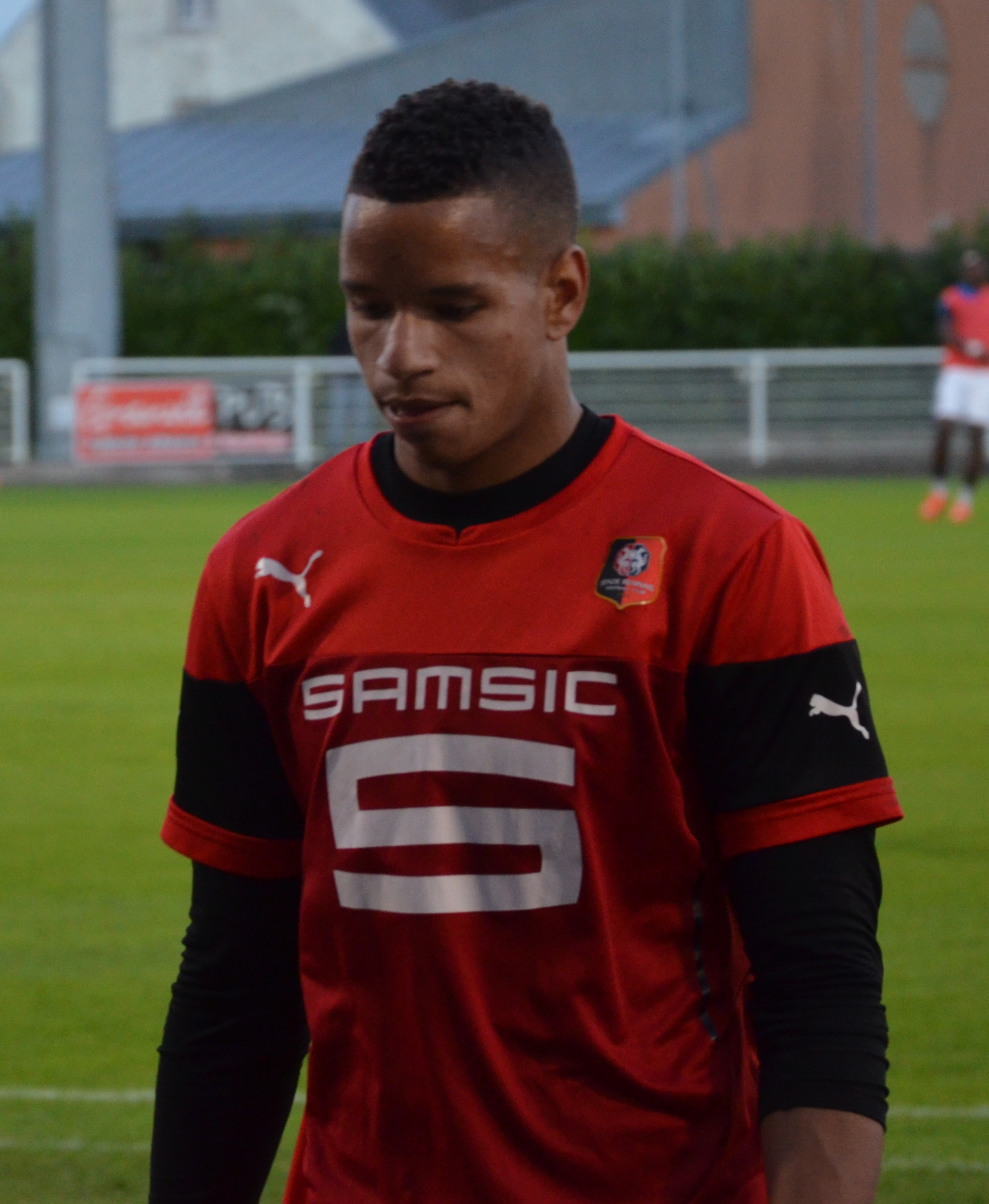
- Dilo with Rennes B in November 2014

Personal information
- Full name: Christopher Jean-Louis Dilo
- Date of birth: 5 January 1994 (age 32)
- Place of birth: Argenteuil, France
- Height: 1.89 m (6 ft 2 in)
- Position: Goalkeeper

Team information
- Current team: Toulon
- Number: 30

Youth career
- 2000–2004: Montigny-lès-Cormeilles
- 2004–2008: Paris Saint-Germain
- 2008–2010: Entente SSG
- 2010–2012: Blackburn Rovers

Senior career*
Years	Team	Apps	(Gls)
2012–2013	Blackburn Rovers	0	(0)
2012–2013	→ Hyde (loan)	11	(0)
2013–2014	St Mirren	13	(0)
2014–2015	Rennes B	12	(0)
2015–2016	Dijon B	21	(0)
2016–2017	Sochaux B	4	(0)
2016–2017	Sochaux	11	(0)
2018–2020	Paris FC B	30	(0)
2018–2020	Paris FC	2	(0)
2019–2020	→ Cholet (loan)	0	(0)
2021–2022	Toulon	18	(0)
2022–2024	Arta/Solar7		
2024–	Toulon	8	(0)

International career
2012	France U18	1	(0)
2019–	Guadeloupe	4	(0)
- * Club domestic league appearances and goals as of 23 November 2024

Christopher Jean-Louis Dilo (born 5 January 1994) is a professional footballer who plays for Championnat National 1 club Toulon as a goalkeeper. Born in metropolitan France, he plays for the Guadeloupe national team.

== Club career ==
Growing up in Paris, Dilo started his youth professional career at the academy of Paris Saint-Germain, the team he supported as a boy.

=== Blackburn Rovers and loan ===
However, the club released Dilo at age sixteen and he joined Blackburn Rovers despite interests from other French clubs. He later explained going to England; "Blackburn were in the Premier League at the time I signed and although I had some French clubs interested in me when I left PSG I wanted to try the UK." During the 2012–13 season, he played on loan for Hyde to gain first team experience. He made an impressive debut defeat losing 3–2 to Ebbsfleet United on 10 November 2012. After two months at Hyde, it was announced on 30 January 2013 that his loan spell had come to an end. He was released by Blackburn at the end of the 2012–13 season.

=== St Mirren ===
Dilo signed a one-year contract with Scottish Premiership club St Mirren in July 2013. Upon joining St Mirren, he soon became homesick, which was later settled down by Ludovic Roy. He became the club's number one goalkeeper in September 2013 after David Cornell was dropped. He kept his first clean sheet against Hearts at Tynecastle, a game which St Mirren won 2–0. He fell out of the first team, after making a handful of appearances, when the club signed the experienced Slovak goalkeeper Marián Kello. After an injury to Kello, Dillo was given another opportunity and he retained his place for the last eight matches of the season keeping three clean sheets. Dilo was released by St Mirren in June 2014, after he failed to respond to the club's offer of a new contract.

=== Rennes ===
After leaving Scotland, Dilo was without a club for a number of months. On 27 September 2014, it was confirmed that has had signed a one-year contract with Stade Rennais.

=== Sochaux ===
On 6 July 2016, departed Dijon joining FC Sochaux-Montbéliard on a one-year contract.

=== Paris FC ===
In January 2018, Dilo joined Ligue 2 side Paris FC, reportedly agreeing a six-month with the option of a further year.

== International career ==
Dilo made his debut for the Guadeloupe national football team on 23 March 2019 in a CONCACAF Nations League qualifier against Martinique.
