= David Greenhill =

Scottish footballer (born 1985)

Personal information
- Full name: David Greenhill
- Date of birth: 8 July 1985 (age 41)
- Place of birth: Edinburgh, Scotland
- Height: 5 ft 7 in (1.70 m)
- Position: Midfielder

Team information
- Current team: Broxburn Athletic

Youth career
- 2002–2003: St Johnstone

Senior career*
Years	Team	Apps	(Gls)
2003–2005	Clyde	5	(0)
2004	→ Montrose (loan)	12	(1)
2005–2006	Alloa Athletic	18	(1)
2006–2012	Berwick Rangers	186	(14)
2012–2015	East Stirlingshire	57	(8)
2015–2020	Spartans		
2020–	Broxburn Athletic		
- * Club domestic league appearances and goals as of 12 July 2020

David Greenhill (born 8 July 1985 in Edinburgh) is a Scottish professional footballer who plays in midfield for Broxburn Athletic.

He was capped by the Scotland Schoolboys in 2002.

== Career ==
Greenhill began his career with St Johnstone, although he did not play for the first team. He then moved to Clyde on a full-time deal and played in their under-19 side for a year, before moving up the first team in the 2004–05 season. He made his senior début coming off the bench against Raith Rovers in August 2004. He was then sent out to Montrose on a season long loan, but this was cut short, and he returned to Clyde at Christmas due to injury. He played for Clyde a further four times before leaving in July 2005.

He spent a year at Alloa Athletic before moving to Berwick Rangers, where he helped the club achieve promotion from the Third Division in the 2006–07 season. Greenhill played for Berwick for six seasons, before moving to East Stirlingshire in 2012.

On 2 June 2015, Greenhill signed for Lowland League side Spartans.

Greenhill signed with Broxburn Athletic in June 2020.
