= Jordan Holt (footballer, born 1994) =

English-born Welsh footballer

Personal information
- Full name: Jordan Rhys Holt
- Date of birth: 4 May 1994 (age 32)
- Place of birth: Frimley, England
- Height: 1.82 m (6 ft 0 in)
- Position: Defender

Youth career
- 2008–2012: Hull City

Senior career*
Years	Team	Apps	(Gls)
2012–2013	St Mirren	0	(0)
2012–2013	→ East Stirlingshire (loan)	9	(2)
2013–2014	Notts County	2	(0)
2014	Gateshead	1	(0)

International career^{‡}
2009	Wales U16	6	(0)
2010–2011	Wales U17	4	(0)
2011–2012	Wales U19	7	(0)
- * Club domestic league appearances and goals as of 18:55, 29 May 2014 (UTC) ‡ National team caps and goals as of 15:50, 31 January 2014 (UTC)

Jordan Rhys Holt (born 4 May 1994) is a Welsh footballer.

== Career ==
Holt was born in Frimley and began his career with Hull City's academy before he joined Scottish side St Mirren in 2012. After one year at St Mirren, he was released after he also spent time out on loan at East Stirlingshire. He joined Notts County in August 2013 following a successful trial. He made his professional debut on 29 October 2013 in a 3–2 victory over Oldham Athletic. On 15 January 2014, Notts County confirmed that Holt had left the club.

On 30 January 2014, Holt signed for Conference Premier side Gateshead. He made his debut on 8 March 2014 as a second-half substitute against Barnet. At the end of the season, Holt was released by Gateshead.
