= Graeme MacGregor =

Scottish footballer

Personal information
- Full name: Graeme MacGregor
- Date of birth: 14 June 1993 (age 33)
- Place of birth: Falkirk, Scotland
- Position: Defender

Youth career
- –2009: Falkirk
- 2009–2012: Bolton Wanderers

Senior career*
Years	Team	Apps	(Gls)
2012	Bolton Wanderers	0	(0)
2012	→ Hamilton Academical	1	(0)
2012–2013	St Mirren	0	(0)
2013–2015	East Stirlingshire	66	(0)
2015–2016	East Fife	3	(0)
2016	Linlithgow Rose		
2016–2018	East Stirlingshire		
2018	East Kilbride		
2018–2019	East Stirlingshire		
2019	Sauchie Juniors		
2019–2020	Bo'ness United		

International career
2008	Scotland U15	2	(1)
2008	Scotland U16	5	(0)
2008–2009	Scotland U17	16	(5)
2010	Scotland U19	1	(0)
- * Club domestic league appearances and goals as of 20:40, 26 October 2024 (UTC)

Graeme MacGregor (born 14 June 1993) is a Scottish footballer who plays primarily as a defender.

MacGregor was with Bolton Wanderers as a youth and played for Scotland under-19. He was released by Bolton Wanderers in June 2012 and signed for St Mirren in September 2012. He then played for East Stirlingshire for two years, before signing for East Fife in July 2015.

== Career ==
MacGregor began his career as a youth player for Falkirk, before joining Bolton Wanderers aged 16 in 2009. He progressed through the youth teams before becoming a member of Bolton's reserve team. He made 12 appearances for the reserves during the 2011–12 season.

On 31 January 2012, MacGregor joined Scottish First Division team Hamilton Academical on loan until the end of the 2011–12 season, after impressing on trial. He was included in the squad for the first time on 7 April 2012, where he was an unused substitute in Hamilton's defeat to Raith Rovers. On 5 May 2012, he made his début on the last day of the season in a 2–2 draw with Partick Thistle. At the end of the season his loan ended and he returned to Bolton, but was released by the club.

On 10 September 2012, MacGregor signed for Scottish Premier League side St Mirren until the end of the 2012–13 season. In March 2013 MacGregor signed for East Stirlingshire; he was then released by them at the end of the 2014–15 season. He signed for East Fife in July 2015, making his competitive debut in a cup victory over Dumbarton. After six months with the Fifers, MacGregor moved to Linlithgow Rose where he stayed until the end of the 2015–16 season, subsequently returning to East Stirlingshire in June 2016 following their relegation to the Lowland League.

== Career statistics ==
As of 11 September 2012

Club	Season	League			FA Cup		League Cup		Other^{[A]}		Total	
Club	Season	Division	Apps	Goals	Apps	Goals	Apps	Goals	Apps	Goals	Apps	Goals
Hamilton Academical	2011–12	Scottish First Division	1	0	0	0	0	0	0	0	1	0
Total			1	0	0	0	0	0	0	0	1	0
St Mirren	2012–13	Scottish Premier League	0	0	0	0	0	0	0	0	0	0
Total			0	0	0	0	0	0	0	0	0	0
East Stirlingshire	2012–13	Scottish Third Division	30	0	0	0	0	0	0	0	6	0
East Stirlingshire	2013–14	Scottish League Two	36	0	1	0	1	0	1	0	11	0
Total			68	0	1	0	1	0	1	0	17	0
Career Totals			68	0	1	0	1	0	1	0	18	0
