= 2006–07 St Mirren F.C. season =

St. Mirren F.C.
2006–07 season
- Manager: Gus MacPherson
- Stadium: St Mirren Park
- Scottish Premier League: 11th
- Scottish Cup: Third round
- Scottish League Cup: Third round
- Top goalscorer: John Sutton (11)
- Highest home attendance: 10,251
- Average home league attendance: 5,609
Home colours

During the 2006–07 Scottish football season, St. Mirren competed in the Scottish Premier League.

== Season summary ==
Back in the Scottish Premier League, St Mirren avoided relegation by four points.

== Final league table ==
Pos	Team	Pld	W	D	L	GF	GA	GD	Pts	Qualification or relegation (Note: Teams played each other three times (33 matches), before the league split into two groups (the top six and the bottom six) for the last five matches.)
8	Inverness Caledonian Thistle	38	11	13	14	42	48	−6	46	
9	Dundee United	38	10	12	16	40	59	−19	42	
10	Motherwell	38	10	8	20	41	61	−20	38	
11	St Mirren	38	8	12	18	31	51	−20	36	
12	Dunfermline Athletic (R)	38	8	8	22	26	55	−29	32	Relegation to the Scottish First Division and qualification for UEFA Cup second qualifying round (Note: As Celtic, the Scottish Cup winners, qualified for the Champions League via their league position, the place in the UEFA Cup was passed to Dunfermline Athletic, the cup runner-up.)

Source: Scottish Professional Football League
Rules for classification: 1) Points; 2) Goal difference; 3) Goals scored
(R) Relegated

== First-team squad ==
Squad at end of season

Note: Flags indicate national team as defined under FIFA eligibility rules; some limited exceptions apply. Players may hold more than one non-FIFA nationality.

No.	Pos.	Nation	Player
1	GK	ENG	Tony Bullock
2	DF	IRL	David van Zanten
3	DF	SCO	Kirk Broadfoot
4	DF	SCO	Andy Millen
5	DF	SCO	Kevin McGowne
6	DF	SCO	John Potter
7	MF	SCO	Hugh Murray
8	MF	SCO	Eddie Malone
9	FW	ENG	John Sutton
10	FW	SCO	Stewart Kean
11	MF	SCO	Alex Burke
12	MF	SCO	Richard Brittain
13	GK	SCO	Craig Hinchliffe
14	MF	SCO	Garry Brady
15	MF	SCO	Mark Corcoran
16	DF	SCO	Ian Maxwell
17	DF	SCO	Alan Reid

No.	Pos.	Nation	Player
19	FW	IRL	Billy Mehmet (Note: Mehmet was born in Southwark, England, but also qualified to represent Cyprus and Turkey internationally through his father and the Republic of Ireland internationally through his maternal grandfather and represented the Republic of Ireland at U-21 level.)
20	MF	SCO	Craig Molloy
21	DF	SCO	Ryan McCay
22	FW	SCO	David McKenna
23	MF	SCO	Iain Anderson
24	GK	SCO	Chris Smith
25	FW	SCO	John Baird
26	FW	SCO	Stephen Anderson
27	FW	SCO	Scott Gemmill
28	MF	SCO	David Barron
29	DF	SCO	Stuart Balmer
30	DF	SCO	Mark Docherty
36	GK	SCO	Danny McColgan
41	MF	SCO	Stephen McGinn
44	MF	SCO	Stephen O'Donnell
45	MF	SCO	Paul Lawson (on loan from Celtic)

=== Left club during season ===
Note: Flags indicate national team as defined under FIFA eligibility rules; some limited exceptions apply. Players may hold more than one non-FIFA nationality.

No. / Pos. / Nation / Player; 8 / DF / SCO / Simon Lappin (to Norwich City)	No. / Pos. / Nation / Player; 18 / MF / SCO / Brian McGinty (released)

== See also ==
- List of St Mirren F.C. seasons
