= 2010 Scottish League Cup final =

- Event: 2009–10 Scottish League Cup
St Mirren	Rangers
0	1
- Date: 21 March 2010
- Venue: Hampden Park, Glasgow
- Man of the Match: Garry Brady
- Referee: Craig Thomson
- Attendance: 44,538

The 2010 Scottish League Cup final was the final match of the 2009–10 Scottish League Cup, the 63rd season of the Scottish League Cup.

== Route to the final ==
=== St Mirren ===
Round	Opposition	Score
First Round	East Stirlingshire (a)	3–6
Second Round	Ayr United (a)	0–2
Third Round	Kilmarnock (a)	1–2
Quarter-final	Motherwell (h)	3–0
Semi-final	Hearts (n)	1–0

St Mirren faced Third Division East Stirlingshire at Ochilview Park in their first match, a comfortable 6–3 victory was secured with five goals from Billy Mehmet and one from Stephen O'Donnell. Mehmet scored one from close range, one from a chip and a third from a header to complete his hat-trick in 17 minutes. The half time score was 3–4 with Memhet scoring all of St Mirren's goals and Stephen McGuire and an Andy Rodgers brace netting for East Stirlingshire. Memhet and O'Donnell completed the scoring in the second half. St Mirren then travelled to Somerset Park to play Ayr United, Michael Higdon scored the opener after 25 minutes with a header from a David Barron cross. Dean Keenan was sent off for United in 89 minutes and Billy Memhet scored 66 seconds later to ensure the win. The further trip to Ayrshire awaited St Mirren in the third round at Rugby Park, the match ended 1-2 to the away team with goals from Stephen McGinn and a 93-minute Andy Dorman strike. The quarter-final opponents were Motherwell at St Mirren Park. The match ended 3–0 with goals from Michael Higdon, Jack Ross and a Stephen Craigan own goal. Memhet added his eighth goal of the League Cup campaign with the only goal in a 1-0 semi-final win over Hearts at Fir Park.

=== Rangers ===
Round	Opposition	Score
Third Round	Queen of the South (a)	1–2
Quarter-final	Dundee (a)	1–3
Semi-final	St Johnstone (n)	2–0

As Rangers had been competing in Europe, they entered the competition in the third round. Rangers began their campaign against Dumfries team Queen of the South from the First Division, it was the first meeting between the two teams since the 2008 Scottish Cup Final. Steven Naismith opened the scoring with a tap in from a Kris Boyd cross. Substitute Nacho Novo made it 2-0 to Rangers but former Rangers youth player Robert Harris scored a consolation in 91 minutes. Dundee were beaten 3–1 at Dens Park in the quarter-final, Steven Whittaker headed Rangers in front before a Leigh Griffiths free-kick made the scores level at half time. Rangers then took the lead against the run of play with a Gary MacKenzie own-goal on 57 minutes and John Fleck rounded off the scoring with five minutes to go. St Johnstone were the next opponents, goals from Steven Davis and Lee McCulloch ensured a 2–0 victory at Hampden Park. After 26 minutes, Davis latched onto Nacho Novo's cross and lashed the ball into the net from close range at the second attempt. McCulloch doubled their advantage following fine build-up play with a low, driven shot from the edge of the box that slipped under the body of Saints goalkeeper Graeme Smith.

== Match ==
=== Team news ===
St Mirren were without defender Chris Innes due to a torn abductor muscle. Also missing were Rory Loy, who was ineligible under the terms of his loan deal from Rangers, and Tom Brighton. Brighton was ruled out for the rest of the 2009–10 season due to a knee injury.

Rangers defender Madjid Bougherra missed his second successive League Cup final through a hamstring injury. Also missing was Kirk Broadfoot due to a hamstring strain. On 20 March Rangers manager Walter Smith stated that Neil Alexander, usually Rangers' reserve goalkeeper, was to continue in goal for the final, having played in the previous rounds. Midfielder Steven Davis was a late fitness concern with a sickness bug.

=== Match Summary ===
The Buddies dominated the first half, Steven Thomson and David Barron coming close to breaking the deadlock. Kevin Thomson was sent off for a dangerous tackle on his namesake Steven and Danny Wilson saw red for a professional foul on Craig Dargo. But Kenny Miller headed a dramatic winner for Rangers' nine men in the 84th minute.

Three days after their demoralising defeat, St Mirren defeated Celtic 4–0 in a Scottish Premier League fixture, with the surprise result going a long way to ensuring their survival in the division and derailing Celtic's challenge for the league title, which instead ultimately went to Rangers. In contrast, on the same night Rangers were eliminated from the Scottish Cup by eventual winners Dundee United, ending the Govan club's hopes of a treble.

=== Match details ===
21 March 2010
15:00

St Mirren	0–1	Rangers
	Report	Miller 84'

Hampden Park, Glasgow
Attendance: 44,538
Referee: C. Thomson

St Mirren	Rangers

ST MIRREN :
GK	1	(Scotland) Paul Gallacher
RWB	2	(Scotland) Jack Ross
CB	4	(Scotland) David Barron
CB	6	(Scotland) John Potter (c)
CB	5	(Scotland) Lee Mair	(yellow card) 57'
LWB	3	(Republic of Ireland) Graham Carey
CM	7	(Scotland) Hugh Murray	(yellow card) 19'	(substituted off) 60'
CM	10	(Scotland) Steven Thomson
CM	8	(Scotland) Garry Brady	(yellow card) 67'	(substituted off) 85'
CF	9	(Republic of Ireland) Billy Mehmet		(substituted off) 70'
CF	11	(England) Michael Higdon
Substitutes:
GK	17	(England) Mark Howard
DF	15	(Scotland) Steven Robb
MF	16	(Wales) Andy Dorman		(substituted on) 60'
FW	12	(Scotland) Stephen O'Donnell		(substituted on) 85'
FW	14	(Scotland) Craig Dargo		(substituted on) 70'
Manager:
(Scotland) Gus MacPherson

RANGERS :
GK	25	(Scotland) Neil Alexander
RB	16	(Scotland) Steven Whittaker	(yellow card) 29'
CB	3	(Scotland) David Weir (c)
CB	66	(Scotland) Danny Wilson	(red card) 71'
LB	5	(Bosnia and Herzegovina) Saša Papac
RM	7	(Northern Ireland) Steven Davis		(substituted off) 45'
CM	6	(Scotland) Lee McCulloch	(yellow card) 73'
CM	8	(Scotland) Kevin Thomson	(red card) 53'
LM	10	(Spain) Nacho Novo		(substituted off) 89'
FW	9	(Scotland) Kris Boyd		(substituted off) 79'
FW	18	(Scotland) Kenny Miller	(yellow card) 85'
Substitutes:
GK	1	(Scotland) Allan McGregor
DF	26	(Scotland) Steven Smith		(substituted on) 89'
MF	2	(United States) Maurice Edu		(substituted on) 45'
FW	20	(United States) Damarcus Beasley
FW	14	(Scotland) Steven Naismith		(substituted on) 79'
Manager:
(Scotland) Walter Smith

MATCH OFFICIALS

- Referee: Craig Thomson
- Assistant Referee 1: Martin Cryans
- Assistant Referee 2: James Bee
- Fourth Official: Brian Winter

MATCH RULES

- 90 minutes
- 30 minutes of extra-time if necessary
- Penalty shoot-out if scores still level
- Five named substitutes
- Maximum of three substitutions

=== Statistics ===
Statistic	St Mirren	Rangers
Goals scored	0	1
Total shots	11	14
Shots on target	3	4
Ball possession	65%	35%
Corner kicks	9	2
Fouls committed	23	11
Offsides	0	0
Yellow cards	3	3
Red cards	0	2

== Media coverage ==
The 2010 Scottish League Cup Final was broadcast live on BBC One Scotland on their Sportscene programme with build-up starting at 14:30 GMT. In Ireland it was broadcast live on Setanta Ireland.

Commentary of the match on radio was from BBC Radio Scotland, BBC Radio nan Gàidheal and BBC Radio 5 Live Sports Extra.
