= 2007–08 St Mirren F.C. season =

St Mirren
2007–08 season
- Chairman: Stewart Gilmour
- Manager: Gus McPherson
- Scottish Premier League: 10th
- Scottish Cup: Quarter-finals
- League Cup: 2nd Round
- Top goalscorer: League: Billy Mehmet (6); All: Billy Mehmet (8)
Home colours

The 2007–08 season was St Mirren's second consecutive season in the Scottish Premier League, and they were looking to improve on last season's 11th placing ahead of Dunfermline.

They also competed in the Scottish League Cup and the Scottish Cup, however were the subject of a shock defeat in the League Cup by 3rd Division East Fife.

They were knocked out in the 6th Round of the Scottish Cup by First Division side St Johnstone. The Buddies began 2008 much more positively than 2007 where they won only 2 home games. By 19 January, they had broken this record by winning 3 games in a row.

== Transfers ==
In:

Player	From	Fee
(Scotland) Will Haining	Oldham Athletic	Free
(Scotland) Gary Mason	Dunfermline Athletic	Free
(Scotland) Craig Dargo	Inverness CT	Free
(England) Mark Howard	Cardiff City	Free
(Argentina) Franco Miranda	Helsingborgs IF	Free
(Scotland) Paul Mathers	East Fife	Undisclosed
(Trinidad and Tobago) Chris Birchall	Coventry City	Loan
(England) Andy Dorman	New England Revolution	Free
(Scotland) Jim Hamilton	Dunfermline	Free

Out:

Player	To	Fee
(Scotland) Kirk Broadfoot	Rangers	Pre-Contract
(England) John Sutton	Wycombe	Free
(England) Tony Bullock	Ross County	Free
(Scotland) Craig Hinchliffe	Partick Thistle	Free
(Scotland) David McKenna	Stirling Albion	Free
(Scotland) John Baird	Montrose	Free
(Scotland) Kevin McGowne	Montrose	Free
(Scotland) Scott Gemmill	Berwick Rangers	Contract Expired
(Scotland) Paul Lawson	Celtic	Loan Return
(Scotland) Eddie Malone	Dundee	On Loan
(Trinidad and Tobago) Chris Birchall	Coventry City	Loan Return
(Scotland) Eddie Malone	Dundee	Undisclosed
(Scotland) Alex Burke	Dunfermline	Loan

== Players ==
=== Squad ===
Note: Flags indicate national team as defined under FIFA eligibility rules; some limited exceptions apply. Players may hold more than one non-FIFA nationality.

No.	Pos.	Nation	Player
1	GK	SCO	Chris Smith
2	DF	IRL	David van Zanten
3	DF	SCO	Alan Reid
4	MF	SCO	Gary Mason
5	DF	SCO	Will Haining
6	DF	SCO	John Potter
7	MF	SCO	Hugh Murray (captain)
8	DF	SCO	Eddie Malone
9	FW	IRL	Billy Mehmet
10	FW	SCO	Stewart Kean
11	MF	SCO	Alex Burke
12	MF	SCO	Richard Brittain
14	MF	SCO	Garry Brady

No.	Pos.	Nation	Player
15	FW	SCO	Mark Corcoran
16	DF	SCO	Ian Maxwell
17	FW	SCO	Craig Dargo
18	MF	WAL	Andy Dorman
19	DF	ARG	Franco Miranda
20	MF	SCO	Craig Molloy
21	GK	ENG	Mark Howard
22	MF	SCO	Stephen O'Donnell
23	DF	SCO	Ryan McCay
25	FW	SCO	David Barron
26	MF	SCO	Stephen McGinn
28	MF	SCO	Andy Millen
30	GK	SCO	Paul Mathers
46	MF	TTO	Chris Birchall

== Fixtures and results ==
Fixtures and results for St Mirren F.C. for season 2007–08.

NOTE: scores are written St Mirren first

Date	Venue	Opponents	Score	Competition	St Mirren Scorers	SPL Pos.	Match Report
17 July 2007	Forthbank Stadium	Stirling Albion	3–0	Friendly	Corcoran, McCay, Kean (pen.)	N/A	Mirren MAD
19 July 2007	The Showgrounds	Newry City	0–0	Friendly	−-	N/A	Mirren MAD
21 July 2007	Stangmore Park	Dungannon Swifts	4–0	Friendly	Mehmet, Haining, Dargo (x2)	N/A	Mirren MAD
26 July 2007	Strathclyde Homes Stadium	Dumbarton	3–0	Friendly	Kean (x2), Corcoran	N/A	Mirren MAD
28 July 2007	Love Street	Morton	1–0	RCF	Corcoran	N/A	Mirren MAD
4 August 2007	Love Street	Motherwell	0–1	SPL	−-	10th	BBC Sport
11 August 2007	Ibrox Stadium	Rangers	0–2	SPL	−-	10th	BBC Sport
18 August 2007	Love Street	Inverness CT	2–1	SPL	Miranda, Corcoran	7th	BBC Sport
25 August 2007	Falkirk Stadium	Falkirk	1–0	SPL	Mehmet	7th	BBC Sport
28 August 2007	Love Street	East Fife	0–1	League Cup	−-	N/A	BBC Sport
2 September 2007	Love Street	Celtic	1–5	SPL	Miranda	7th	BBC Sport
6 September 2007	Love Street	Derby County	1–0	Hugh Murray Testimonial	Mehmet	N/A	Mirren MAD
16 September 2007	Tannadice	Dundee United	0–2	SPL	−-	8th	BBC Sport
22 September 2007	Rugby Park	Kilmarnock	0–0	SPL	−-	9th	BBC Sport
30 September 2007	Love Street	Heart of Midlothian	1–3	SPL	Corcoran	10th	BBC Sport
7 October 2007	Pittodrie	Aberdeen	0–4	SPL	−-	11th	BBC Sport
20 October 2007	Love Street	Gretna	1–0	SPL	Mehmet	9th	BBC Sport
27 October 2007	Easter Road	Hibernian	1–0	SPL	Mehmet	9th	BBC Sport
3 November 2007	Fir Park	Motherwell	1–1	SPL	Kean	9th	BBC Sport
24 November 2007	Caledonian Stadium	Inverness CT	0–1	SPL	−-	9th	BBC Sport
1 December 2007	Love Street	Falkirk	1–5	SPL	Mehmet	11th	BBC Sport
8 December 2007	Celtic Park	Celtic	1–1	SPL	McGinn	11th	BBC Sport
15 December 2007	Love Street	Dundee United	0–3	SPL	−-	11th	BBC Sport
22 December 2007	Love Street	Kilmarnock	0–0	SPL	−-	11th	BBC Sport
26 December 2007	Tynecastle	Heart of Midlothian	1–0	SPL	McGinn	11th	BBC Sport
29 December 2007	Love Street	Aberdeen	0–1	SPL	−-	11th	BBC Sport
5 January 2008	Love Street	Hibernian	2–1	SPL	Maxwell, Mason	10th	BBC Sport
12 January 2008	Love Street	Dumbarton	3–0	Scottish Cup	Corcoran, Barron, Mehmet	N/A	BBC Sport
19 January 2008	Love Street	Motherwell	3–1	SPL	Corcoran, Maxwell (x2)	9th	BBC Sport
26 January 2008	Ibrox Stadium	Rangers	0–4	SPL	−-	10th	BBC Sport
2 February 2008	Love Street	Dundee United	0–0	Scottish Cup 5th Round	−-	N/A	BBC Sport
9 February 2008	Love Street	Inverness CT	1–1	SPL	Mehmet	10th	BBC Sport
13 February 2008	Tannadice	Dundee United	1–0	Scottish Cup 5th Round Replay	Dorman	N/A	BBC Sport
16 February 2008	Falkirk Stadium	Falkirk	0–4	SPL	−-	10th	BBC Sport
24 February 2008	Love Street	Celtic	0–1	SPL	−-	10th	BBC Sport
27 February 2008	Tannadice	Dundee United	1–1	SPL	Dorman	10th	BBC Sport
1 March 2008	Rugby Park	Kilmarnock	0–1	SPL	−-	11th	BBC Sport
8 March 2008	McDiarmid Park	St Johnstone	1–1	Scottish Cup 6th Round	Dorman	N/A	BBC Sport
15 March 2008	Love Street	Heart of Midlothian	1–1	SPL	Hamilton	11th	BBC Sport
18 March 2008	Love Street	St Johnstone	1–3	Scottish Cup 6th Round Replay	Mehmet (pen.)	N/A	BBC Sport
22 March 2008	Pittodrie	Aberdeen	1–1	SPL	Dorman	11th	BBC Sport
29 March 2008	Love Street	Gretna	2–0	SPL	Dargo, Mehmet	11th	BBC Sport
5 April 2008	Easter Road	Hibs	0–2	SPL	−-	11th	BBC Sport
10 April 2008	Fir Park	Gretna	0–0	SPL	−-	11th	BBC Sport
19 April 2008	Tynecastle	Heart of Midlothian	2–3	SPL	McCay; Mason	11th	BBC Sport

== Competitions ==
=== SPL ===
==== Classification ====
Pos	Team	Pld	W	D	L	GF	GA	GD	Pts	Qualification or relegation (Note: Teams played each other three times (33 matches), before the league split into two groups (the top six and the bottom six) for the last five matches.)
8	Heart of Midlothian	38	13	9	16	47	55	−8	48	
9	Inverness Caledonian Thistle	38	13	4	21	51	62	−11	43	
10	St Mirren	38	10	11	17	26	54	−28	41	
11	Kilmarnock	38	10	10	18	39	52	−13	40	
12	Gretna (R)	38	5	8	25	32	83	−51	13 (Note: Gretna were deducted 10 points for entering administration.)	Resigned from the Scottish Football League and liquidated (Note: At the end of the season, Gretna were relegated to the Third Division due to their financial struggles. However, as no buyer was found for the club, they resigned from the Scottish Football League and were subsequently liquidated.)

Source: Scottish Professional Football League
Rules for classification: 1) Points; 2) Goal difference; 3) Goals scored
(R) Relegated

== See also ==
- List of St Mirren F.C. seasons
