= 2009–10 St Mirren F.C. season =

St Mirren
2009–10 season
- Chairman: Stewart Gilmour
- Manager: Gus MacPherson
- Scottish Premier League: 10th
- Scottish Cup: Fifth Round Replay (v Rangers)
- League Cup: Runners-Up (v Rangers)
- Top goalscorer: League: Andy Dorman (6); All: Billy Mehmet (12)
- Highest home attendance: 6,164 vs Celtic (26 September 2009)
- Lowest home attendance: 3,009 vs St Johnstone (10 February 2010)
- Average home league attendance: 4,414
Home colours	Away colours	Third colours

St Mirren competed for their fourth successive season in the Scottish Premier League after finishing 11th place for season 2008–09, narrowly avoiding relegation on goal difference. It will also be their first full season in their new home ground, since moving from Love Street in January. Saints won their first league match at their new home with a 2–1 victory over Heart of Midlothian on 3 October 2009.

== Transfers ==
=== In ===
Date	Player	From	Fee	Source
29 June 2009	(Scotland) Paul Gallacher	(Scotland) Dunfermline	Undisclosed	BBC
1 July 2009	(Scotland) Lee Mair	(Scotland) Aberdeen	Free Transfer	BBC
1 July 2009	(Scotland) Michael Higdon	(Scotland) Falkirk	Free Transfer	BBC
4 July 2009	(Scotland) Chris Innes	(Scotland) Livingston / Free Agent	Free Transfer	BBC
21 September 2009	(Scotland) Allan Johnston	Unattached	Signed	BBC

=== Out ===
Date	Player	To	Fee	Source
1 July 2009	(Scotland) Mark McAusland	(Scotland) Queen of the South	Free Transfer	BBC
1 July 2009	(Scotland) Jim Hamilton	(Scotland) Partick Thistle	Free Transfer	BBC
1 July 2009	(Scotland) Will Haining	(England) Morecambe	Free Transfer	BBC
1 July 2009	(Scotland) Gary Mason	(Scotland) Hamilton	Free Transfer	BBC
1 July 2009	(Argentina) Franco Miranda	(Argentina) Chacarita Juniors	Free Transfer	BBC
1 July 2009	(Scotland) Scott Gair	(Scotland) Clyde	Free Transfer	BBC
1 July 2009	(Scotland) Sean Crighton	(Scotland) Montrose	Free Transfer	BBC
1 July 2009	(Spain) Tonet	(Spain) Villajoyosa CF	Free Transfer	BBC
1 July 2009	(Scotland) Scott Cuthbert	(Scotland) Celtic	Loan Ends	BBC
15 January 2010	(Scotland) Stephen McGinn	(England) Watford	Undisclosed fee	BBC
26 January 2010	(Scotland) Dennis Wyness	(Scotland) Dumbarton	Released	BBC
27 January 2010	(Guinea) Mo Camara	(England) Torquay United	Released	BBC

=== Loan in ===
Date	Player	To	Fee	Source
29 January 2010	(Scotland) Rory Loy	(Scotland) Rangers	Loan	BBC
1 February 2010	(Republic of Ireland) Graham Carey	(Scotland) Celtic	Loan	BBC

=== Loan out ===
Date	Player	To	Fee	Source
25 September 2009	(Scotland) Dennis Wyness	(Scotland) Queen of the South	Loan	BBC
October 2009	(Scotland) Paul Quinn	(Scotland) Queen's Park	Loan	BBC
December 2009	(Scotland) Chris Smith	(Scotland) Dunfermline	Loan	BBC

== Results ==
=== Scottish Premier League ===
15 August 2009 SPL Round 1	Hibernian	2 – 1	St Mirren	Easter Road, Edinburgh
	Wotherspoon 39'; Benjelloun 83'	BBC Sport	McGinn 38'	Attendance: 13,426; Referee: Muir

22 August 2009 SPL Round 2	St Mirren	0 – 0	Dundee United	St Mirren Park, Paisley
		BBC Sport		Attendance: 4,775; Referee: McDonald

29 August 2009 SPL Round 3	Kilmarnock	1 – 2	St Mirren	Rugby Park, Kilmarnock
	Sammon 4'	BBC Sport	McGinn 48', 69'	Attendance: 5,645; Referee: Norris

12 September 2009 SPL Round 4	St Mirren	1 – 1	St Johnstone	St Mirren Park, Paisley
	Mehmet 33' (pen.)	BBC Sport	Morris 37'	Attendance: 4,543; Referee: Nicholls

19 September 2009 SPL Round 5	Aberdeen	1 – 0	St Mirren	Pittodrie, Aberdeen
	Mulgrew 88'	BBC Sport	Mair (yellow card) 88' (red card)	Attendance: 10,103; Referee: Thomson

26 September 2009 SPL Round 6	St Mirren	0 – 2	Celtic	St Mirren Park, Paisley
		BBC Sport	McCourt 27'; Maloney 78'	Attendance: 6,164; Referee: Richmond

3 October 2009 SPL Round 7	St Mirren	2 – 1	Heart of Midlothian	St Mirren Park, Paisley
	Thomson 38'; Dargo 65'	BBC Sport	Goncalves 31'	Attendance: 4,652; Referee: Winter

17 October 2009 SPL Round 8	Falkirk	1 – 3	St Mirren	Falkirk Stadium, Falkirk
	McLean 55'	BBC Sport	Dargo 67'; Mehmet 71'; Brighton 88'	Attendance: 5,084; Referee: Allen

24 October 2009 SPL Round 9	St Mirren	3 – 3	Motherwell	St Mirren Park, Paisley
	Murray 42', 72'; Dorman 59'	BBC Sport	Forbes 49' (pen.); Jutkiewicz 74', 81'	Attendance: 4,327; Referee: O'Reilly

31 October 2009 SPL Round 10	St Mirren	0 – 2	Hamilton Academical	St Mirren Park, Paisley
	Mair (red card) 67'	BBC Sport	M Paixao 3'; Canning 41'	Attendance: 4,022; Referee: Finnie

7 November 2009 SPL Round 11	Rangers	2 – 1	St Mirren	Ibrox Park, Glasgow
	Boyd 1', 57'	BBC Sport	O'Donnell 88'	Attendance: 45,750; Referee: Brines

21 November 2009 SPL Round 12	St Mirren	1 – 1	Hibernian	St Mirren Park, Paisley
	Innes 45'	BBC Sport	Riordan 29'	Attendance: 4,681; Referee: Collum

28 November 2009 SPL Round 13	Celtic	3 – 1	St Mirren	Celtic Park, Glasgow
	Innes 39' (o.g.); Samaras 42'; McDonald 61'	BBC Sport	Higdon 45'	Attendance: 41,000; Referee: Conroy

5 December 2009 SPL Round 14	Dundee United	3 – 2	St Mirren	Tannadice Park, Dundee
	Casalinuovo 29'; Conway 44'; Myrie-Williams 79'; Gomis (red card) 59'	BBC Sport	Dods 61' (o.g.); O'Donnell 85'	Attendance: 6,259; Referee: Conroy

12 December 2009 SPL Round 15	St Mirren	1 – 1	Falkirk	St Mirren Park, Paisley
	Higdon 53'	BBC Sport	Finnigan 88'	Attendance: 4,033; Referee: Thomson

19 December 2009 SPL Round 16	St Johnstone	1 – 0	St Mirren	McDiarmid Park, Perth
	Millar 19'	BBC Sport	Higdon (yellow card) 53' (red card)	Attendance: 2,993; Referee: Tumilty

26 December 2009 SPL Round 17	St Mirren	P – P	Aberdeen	St Mirren Park, Paisley

30 December 2009 SPL Round 18	Hamilton Academical	P – P	St Mirren	New Douglas Park, Hamilton

2 January 2010 SPL Round 19	St Mirren	1 – 0	Kilmarnock	St Mirren Park, Paisley
	Innes 81'	BBC Sport		Attendance: 4,917; Referee: Muir

12 January 2010 SPL Rearranged Round 17	St Mirren	1 – 0	Aberdeen	St Mirren Park, Paisley
	Innes 74'	BBC Sport		Attendance: 3,867; Referee: Collum

16 January 2010 SPL Round 20	Heart of Midlothian	1 – 0	St Mirren	Tynecastle Stadium, Edinburgh
	Stewart 24' (pen.)	BBC Sport		Attendance: 12,821; Referee: O'Reilly

23 January 2010 SPL Round 21	Motherwell	2 – 0	St Mirren	Fir Park, Motherwell
	Murphy 56'; Sutton 76'	BBC Sport		Attendance: 3,621; Referee: McDonald

27 January 2010 SPL Round 22	St Mirren	0 – 2	Rangers	St Mirren Park, Paisley
		BBC Sport	Davis 2'; Novo 86'	Attendance: 5,260; Referee: Thomson

30 January 2010 SPL Round 23	Hibernian	2 – 1	St Mirren	Easter Road, Edinburgh
	Miller 33'; Ross 90' (+3), o.g.'	BBC Sport	Bamba 9' (o.g.)	Attendance: 11,476; Referee: Collum

10 February 2010 SPL Round 24	St Mirren	1 – 1	St Johnstone	St Mirren Park, Paisley
	Higdon 71'	BBC Sport	MacKay 33'	Attendance: 3,009; Referee: Tumilty

13 February 2010 SPL Round 25	St Mirren	1 – 2	Dundee United	St Mirren Park, Paisley
	Higdon 66'	BBC Sport	Swanson 83'; Goodwillie 90' (+4)	Attendance: 3,944; Referee: Norris

20 February 2010 SPL Round 26	Kilmarnock	1 – 1	St Mirren	Rugby Park, Kilmarnock
	Maguire 33'	BBC Sport	Mehmet 82'	Attendance: 5,501; Referee: Muir

27 February 2010 SPL Round 27	St Mirren	0 – 0	Hamilton Academical	St Mirren Park, Paisley
		BBC Sport		Attendance: 3,628; Referee: Allan

6 March 2010 SPL Round 28	Rangers	3 – 1	St Mirren	Ibrox Stadium, Glasgow
	McCulloch 32', 46'; Novo 78'	BBC Sport	Carey 30'	Attendance: 47,474; Referee: Richmond

9 March 2010 SPL Round 29	St Mirren	0 – 0	Motherwell	St Mirren Park, Paisley
		BBC Sport		Attendance: 3,154; Referee: McDonald

13 March 2010 SPL Rearranged Round 18	Hamilton Academical	1 – 0	St Mirren	New Douglas Park, Hamilton
	F.Paixão 90'	BBC Sport		Attendance: 2,179; Referee: Norris

24 March 2010 SPL Round 30	St Mirren	4 – 0	Celtic	St Mirren Park, Paisley
	Dorman 38', 84'; Thomson 58', 87'	BBC Sport		Attendance: 5,018; Referee: Richmond

27 March 2010 SPL Round 31	Aberdeen	2 – 1	St Mirren	Pittodrie Stadium, Aberdeen
	Diamond 37'; Aluko 56'	BBC Sport	Robb 80'	Attendance: 8,764; Referee: Brian Winter

3 April 2010 SPL Round 32	St Mirren	1 – 1	Heart of Midlothian	St Mirren Park, Paisley
	Carey 44'	BBC Sport	Žaliūkas 47'	Attendance: 4,204; Referee: Iain Brines

10 April 2010 SPL Round 33	Falkirk	2 – 1	St Mirren	Falkirk Stadium, Falkirk
	Moutinho 45'; Higdon 67' (o.g.)	BBC Sport	Dorman 90'	Attendance: 5,671; Referee: Dougie McDonald

17 April 2010 SPL Round 34	St Johnstone	2 – 2	St Mirren	McDiarmid Park, Perth
	Duberry 79'; Sheerin 90' (pen.)	BBC Sport	Carey 33'; Dorman 50'	Attendance: 3,557; Referee: Charlie Richmond

24 April 2010 SPL Round 35	St Mirren	1 – 0	Kilmarnock	St Mirren Park, Paisley
	Dorman 74'	BBC Sport		Attendance: 5,639; Referee: Craig Thomson

1 May 2010 SPL Round 36	Falkirk	1 – 1	St Mirren	Falkirk Stadium, Falkirk
	Arfield 45' (pen.)	BBC Sport	Innes (red card) 45'; O'Donnell 86'	Attendance: 5,919; Referee: William Collum

5 May 2010 SPL Round 37	Hamilton Academical	0 – 0	St Mirren	New Douglas Park, Hamilton
		BBC Sport		Attendance: 3,102; Referee: Iain Brines

8 May 2010 SPL Round 38	St Mirren	0 – 1	Aberdeen	St Mirren Park, Paisley
		BBC Sport	Mair 27' (o.g.)	Attendance: 4,022; Referee: Stevie O'Reilly

==== League results by opponent ====
Team	Result				Points
Team	1	2	3	4	Points
Aberdeen	0–1	1–0	1–2	0–1	3
Celtic	0–2	1–3	4–0	–	3
Dundee United	0–0	2–3	1–2	–	1
Falkirk	3–1	1–1	1–2	1–1	5
Hamilton Academical	0–2	0–0	0–1	0–0	2
Heart of Midlothian	2–1	0–1	1–1	–	4
Hibernian	1–2	1–1	1–2	–	1
Kilmarnock	2–1	1–0	1–1	1–0	10
Motherwell	3–3	0–2	0–0	–	2
Rangers	1–2	2–0	1–2	–	0
St Johnstone	1–1	0–1	1–1	2–2	3

Source: 2009–10 Scottish Premier League article

=== Scottish Cup ===
10 January 2010 Active Nation Scottish Cup round 4	St Mirren	3 – 1	Alloa Athletic	St Mirren Park, Paisley
	Crawford 27' (o.g.); Mehmet 45' (+1), 87'	BBC Sport	Brown 34'	Attendance: 2,587; Referee: Finnie

6 February 2010 Active Nation Scottish Cup round 5	St Mirren	0 – 0	Rangers	St Mirren Park, Paisley
		BBC Sport		Attendance: 4,909; Referee: Brines

17 February 2010 Active Nation Scottish Cup round 5 Replay	Rangers	1 – 0	St Mirren	Ibrox Stadium, Glasgow
	Boyd 86'	BBC Sport		Attendance: 31,086; Referee: Brines

=== League Cup ===
2 August 2009 Co-Operative Insurance Cup round 1	East Stirlingshire	3 – 6	St Mirren	Ochilview, Stenhousemuir
	McGuire 23'; Rodgers 27', 36'	BBC Sport	Mehmet 6', 13', 17', 44', 67'; O'Donnell 73'	Attendance: 1,747; Referee: O'Reilly

26 August 2009 Co-Operative Insurance Cup round 2	Ayr United	0 – 2	St Mirren	Somerset Park, Ayr
	Keenan (red card) 89'	BBC Sport	Higdon 25'; Mehmet 90'	Attendance: 1,652; Referee: Richmond

22 September 2009 Co-Operative Insurance Cup round 3	Kilmarnock	1 – 2	St Mirren	Rugby Park, Kilmarnock
	Kyle 87'	BBC Sport	McGinn 64'; Dorman 90' (+3)	Attendance: 3,561; Referee: McDonald

27 October 2009 Co-Operative Insurance Cup Quarter Final	St Mirren	3 – 0	Motherwell	St Mirren Park, Paisley
	Higdon 23'; Ross 61'; Craigan 81' (o.g.)	BBC Sport		Attendance: 4,325; Referee: Collum

2 February 2010 Co-Operative Insurance Cup; Semi Final	Heart of Midlothian	0 – 1	St Mirren	Fir Park, Motherwell
		BBC Sport	Mehmet 51'	Attendance: 9,170; Referee: Richmond

21 March 2010 Co-Operative Insurance Cup; Final	Rangers	1 – 0	St Mirren	Hampden Park, Glasgow
	Thomson (red card) 53'; Wilson (red card) 71'; Miller 84'	BBC Sport		Attendance: 44,538; Referee: Thomson

=== Friendlies ===
Date	Opponent	Venue	Result	Attendance	St Mirren Scorer(s)
14 July 2009	(Scotland) East Fife	Bayview	2–1		Mehmet, Mair
16 July 2009	(Scotland) Dumbarton	Strathclyde Homes Stadium	3–0		O'Donnell, Dargo, Mehmet
18 July 2009	(Scotland) Ayr United	Somerset Park	1–0		Dorman
28 July 2009	(Scotland) Morton (Renfrewshire Cup)	St Mirren Park	2–1		Dorman, O'Donnell
09/08/2009	(England) Wigan	DW Stadium	1–3		Dargo

== Competitions ==
=== Overall ===
Competition	Started round	Final position / round	First match	Last match
Scottish Premier League	—	10th	15 August 2009	8 May 2010
League Cup	1st Round		2 August 2009	21 March 2010
Scottish Cup	4th Round		9 January 2010	17 February 2010

Source: Competitions

=== SPL ===
==== Classification ====
Pos	Team	Pld	W	D	L	GF	GA	GD	Pts	Qualification or relegation
8	St Johnstone	38	12	11	15	57	61	−4	47	
9	Aberdeen	38	10	11	17	36	52	−16	41	
10	St Mirren	38	7	13	18	36	49	−13	34	
11	Kilmarnock	38	8	9	21	29	51	−22	33	
12	Falkirk (R)	38	6	13	19	31	57	−26	31	Relegation to the First Division

Source: SPFL Archive
Rules for classification: 1) points; 2) goal difference; 3) number of goals scored.
(R) Relegated

==== Results by round ====
Round	1	2	3	4	5	6	7	8	9	10	11	12	13	14	15	16	17	18	19	20	21	22	23	24	25	26	27	28	29	30	31	32	33	34	35	36	37	38
Ground	A	H	A	H	A	H	H	A	H	H	A	H	A	A	H	A	H	A	H	A	A	H	A	H	H	A	H	A	H	H	A	H	A	A	H	A	A	H
Result	L	D	W	D	L	L	W	W	D	L	L	D	L	L	D	L	W	L	W	L	L	L	L	D	L	D	D	L	D	W	L	D	L	D	W	D	D	L

Source: BBC Sport
A = Away; H = Home; W = Win; D = Draw; L = Loss

== See also ==
- List of St Mirren F.C. seasons
