= Mark Howard (footballer, born September 1986) =

English footballer

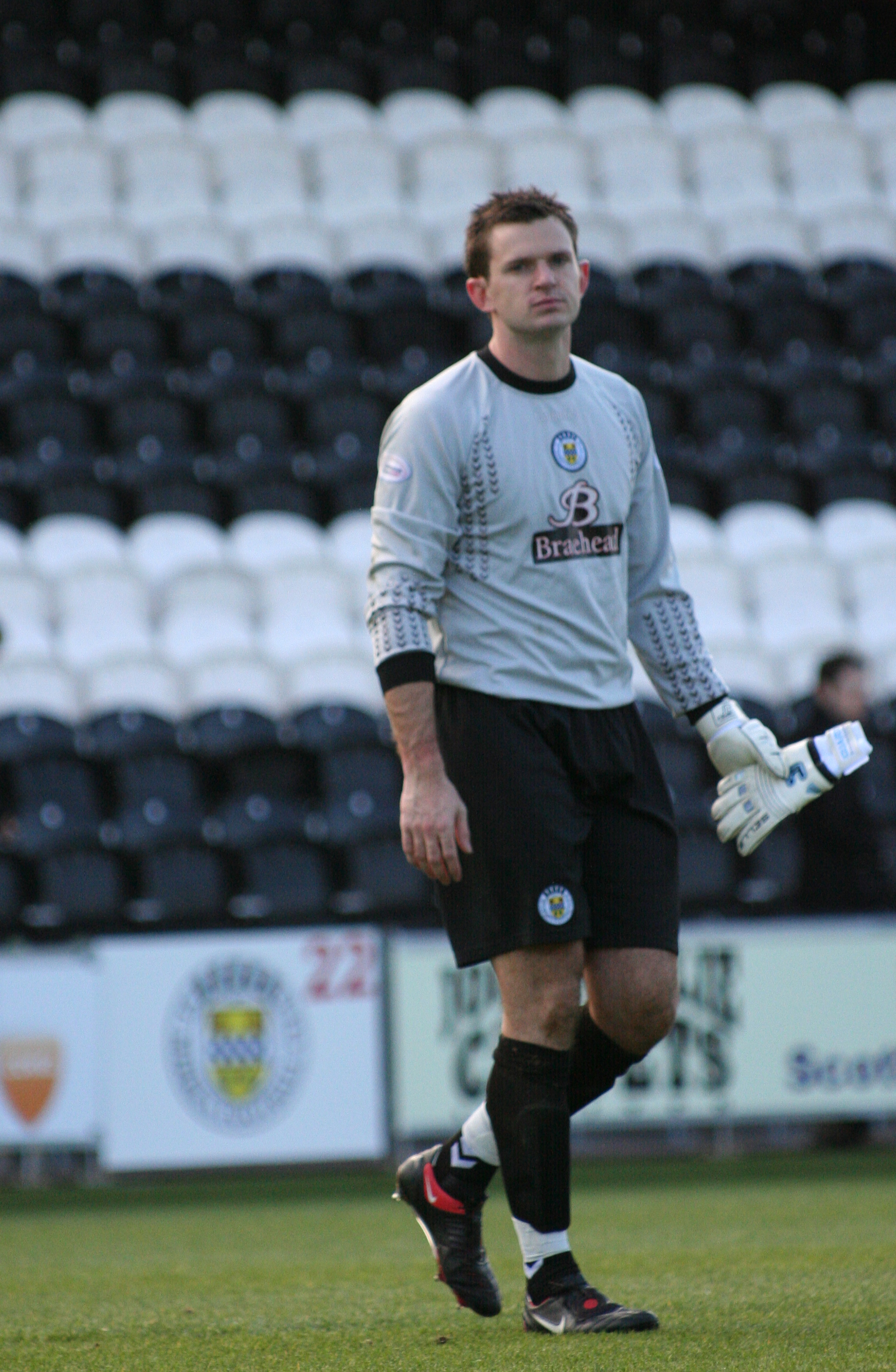
- Howard in 2009 with St Mirren

Personal information
- Full name: Mark Stephen Howard
- Date of birth: 21 September 1986 (age 40)
- Place of birth: Southwark, England
- Height: 6 ft 0 in (1.83 m)
- Position: Goalkeeper

Youth career
- –2005: Arsenal

Senior career*
Years	Team	Apps	(Gls)
2005–2006	Arsenal	0	(0)
2005–2006	→ Falkirk (loan)	8	(0)
2006–2007	Cardiff City	0	(0)
2007	→ Swansea City (loan)	0	(0)
2007–2010	St Mirren	46	(0)
2010–2011	Aberdeen	9	(0)
2011–2012	Blackpool	4	(0)
2012–2016	Sheffield United	80	(0)
2016–2018	Bolton Wanderers	35	(0)
2018–2020	Blackpool	36	(0)
2019	→ Salford City (loan)	3	(0)
2020–2021	Scunthorpe United	34	(0)
2021–2022	Carlisle United	35	(0)
2022–2025	Wrexham	50	(0)
2025–2026	Salford City	2	(0)
- * Club domestic league appearances and goals as of 22:59, 12 October 2025 (UTC)

Mark Stephen Howard (born 21 September 1986) is an English professional footballer who plays as a goalkeeper for EFL League Two club Salford City.

Born in Southwark, London, Howard was part of Arsenal's youth team, but having failed to make the step up to the senior squad he departed for Cardiff City. He moved to Scotland, with spells at St Mirren and Aberdeen, before moving back to England to play for Blackpool, Sheffield United (for whom he holds the club's consecutive clean-sheet record of eight games) and Bolton Wanderers. He returned to Blackpool in 2018 and remained there for two years, during which he had a loan spell at Salford City. He has since had spells at Scunthorpe United, Carlisle United and Wrexham.

He acquired the nickname "Chomp" from John Potter while playing for St Mirren when he sat next to another player nicknamed "Champ".

== Career ==
=== Early career ===
Howard started his career with Arsenal, but he never made an appearance for the first team, although he was an unused substitute during the 2005 FA Community Shield. He was loaned to Scottish Premier League club Falkirk in January 2006, for whom he made eight appearances. After his loan period ended in the summer, Howard was released by Arsenal.

=== Cardiff City ===
Following his release by the Gunners, Howard was offered a permanent contract with Falkirk, but he instead decided to join Cardiff City. He provided backup as a second-choice keeper that season to Neil Alexander. He made his debut for The Bluebirds in a League Cup tie against Barnet.

After a month's loan with Swansea City, as cover in January 2007, he was released by Cardiff at the end of the 2006–07 season.

=== St Mirren ===
Howard joined Scottish club St Mirren and made his debut on 13 February 2008, keeping a clean sheet against Dundee United in a Scottish Cup match. He then made his league debut three days later as St Mirren suffered a 4–0 defeat against Falkirk. Howard soon become first-choice goalkeeper, taking over from Chris Smith, and his performances led to him signing a new two-year contract in April 2009. The following season, however, Howard made only two appearances, after losing his first-choice status to new signing Paul Gallacher, and left the club after three seasons and 52 games.

=== Aberdeen ===
In July 2010, Howard signed a one-year deal with Aberdeen and made his debut on 14 August 2010, keeping a clean sheet in a 4–0 win over Hamilton Academical. As the season progressed, Howard slipped to second-choice behind Jamie Langfield and left the club when the season ended.

=== Blackpool ===
Howard signed a five-month contract with Blackpool in September 2011 as cover after fitness concerns over Matt Gilks and Mark Halstead. He had to wait until Boxing Day later that year to make his full début for the club, in a 3–1 victory at Barnsley. He went on to make three more appearances, his performances prompting manager Ian Holloway to offer him an extension for the rest of the season, but Howard failed to agree terms and left Bloomfield Road when his short-term deal expired.

=== Sheffield United ===
In February 2012, Howard joined Sheffield United on a free transfer, signing a 2 1/2-year contract after a successful two-week trial period, arriving as cover for Steve Simonsen. He did not make a first-team appearance that season. When Simonsen was released the following summer, Howard made his United debut, against Shrewsbury Town on 18 August 2012, keeping a clean sheet in a single-goal victory. Howard remained first-choice keeper until he suffered a thigh injury in the eleventh minute at Matchroom Stadium against Leyton Orient in October 2012, an injury that kept him out of the side for twelve weeks. Replaced by George Long, Howard was unable to regain his place in the team, despite having started the 2012–13 season as first-choice. The following season initially saw Howard continue to play understudy to Long, making only a handful of appearances until he was recalled to the starting lineup by new manager Nigel Clough for an FA Cup tie against Fulham in February 2014. Having kept a clean sheet in that fixture, Howard retained his place and was virtually ever-present until the end of the season, missing only one game. With his current deal set to expire, United opted to take up a one-year extension in May 2014.

=== Bolton Wanderers ===
On 13 July 2016, Howard signed a two-year contract with Bolton Wanderers after leaving Sheffield United at the end of the previous season. On 24 May 2018, Bolton confirmed that Howard would leave the club on 30 June, when his contract came to an end.

=== Blackpool ===
Howard re-joined Blackpool following his release from Bolton. On 5 July 2018, he signed a two-year deal with the Tangerines. He was released in June 2020.

==== Salford City ====
Howard joined Salford City in a seven-day emergency loan on 22 October 2019. The loan was renewed on 29 October.

=== Scunthorpe United ===
On 22 October 2020, Howard joined League Two side Scunthorpe United on a deal until the end of the season.

=== Carlisle United ===
Howard signed for Carlisle United on 14 October 2021. Howard was released at the end of the 2021–22 season, despite having won the Player of the Season award 12 hours before.

=== Wrexham ===
Howard signed a one-year deal at Wrexham on 5 July 2022 following the expiry of his contract at Carlisle. He was part of the team during both promotions to EFL League Two in 2023 and to EFL League One in 2024. Howard also represented Wrexham in The Soccer Tournament (TST) in 2023 and 2024, even scoring 2 goals in back-to-back games in 2024. On 7 June 2024, Howard scored the game-winning goal in the TST Round of 32 game.

On 19 June 2024, he signed a one-year extension with the club. As a result he became one of the squad members achieving the historic back-to-back-to-back promotions with the Club, and playing an active part in matches to achieve that.

In June 2025, Wrexham announced that Howard would be released when his current contract expired at the end of the month.

=== Salford City ===
On 22 July 2025, Howard re-joined League Two club Salford City, who he had previously played for on a short loan in 2019.

== International career ==
Although Howard did not win any official caps for either England, or any of its youth teams, he did appear as a substitute in an unofficial England fixture in 2004, as part of a testimonial for former Arsenal defender Martin Keown. England lost 6–0.

== YouTube ==
Yours, Mine, Away! podcast

YouTube information
- Channel: Yours, Mine, Away!
- Years active: 2022–present
- Subscribers: 15 thousand
- Views: 2.1 million
- Last updated: September 2025

Howard has a podcast YouTube channel called Yours, Mine, Away!. The first episode of the podcast commenced with his interview with Arsenal's goalkeeper Aaron Ramsdale in January 2023.

== Personal life ==
Howard pursued a degree in journalism and media and achieved a First class BA from Staffordshire University in Professional Sports Writing and Broadcasting in November 2023.

== Career statistics ==
As of match played 2 December 2025

Appearances and goals by club, season and competition
Club	Season	League			National Cup		League Cup		Other		Total	
Club	Season	Division	Apps	Goals	Apps	Goals	Apps	Goals	Apps	Goals	Apps	Goals
Arsenal	2005–06	Premier League	0	0	0	0	0	0	0	0	0	0
Falkirk (loan)	2005–06	Scottish Premier League	8	0	0	0	0	0	—		8	0
Cardiff City	2006–07	Championship	0	0	0	0	1	0	—		1	0
Swansea City (loan)	2006–07	League One	0	0	0	0	0	0	0	0	0	0
St Mirren	2007–08	Scottish Premier League	10	0	1	0	0	0	—		11	0
St Mirren	2008–09	Scottish Premier League	34	0	3	0	2	0	—		39	0
St Mirren	2009–10	Scottish Premier League	2	0	0	0	0	0	—		2	0
St Mirren	Total		46	0	4	0	2	0	—		52	0
Aberdeen	2010–11	Scottish Premier League	9	0	0	0	2	0	—		11	0
Blackpool	2011–12	Championship	4	0	1	0	0	0	—		5	0
Sheffield United	2011–12	League One	0	0	—		—		0	0	0	0
Sheffield United	2012–13	League One	11	0	0	0	1	0	0	0	12	0
Sheffield United	2013–14	League One	19	0	4	0	1	0	2 (Note: Appearances in Football League Trophy)	0	26	0
Sheffield United	2014–15	League One	35	0	6	0	7	0	2 (Note: Appearances in League One play-offs)	0	50	0
Sheffield United	2015–16	League One	15	0	0	0	1	0	0	0	16	0
Sheffield United	Total		80	0	10	0	10	0	4	0	104	0
Bolton Wanderers	2016–17	League One	27	0	1	0	0	0	1 (Note: Appearance(s) in EFL Trophy)	0	29	0
Bolton Wanderers	2017–18	Championship	8	0	1	0	1	0	—		10	0
Bolton Wanderers	Total		35	0	2	0	1	0	1	0	39	0
Blackpool	2018–19	League One	32	0	3	0	4	0	0	0	39	0
Blackpool	2019–20	League One	4	0	2	0	0	0	2	0	8	0
Blackpool	Total		36	0	5	0	4	0	2	0	47	0
Salford City (loan)	2019–20	League Two	3	0	0	0	0	0	0	0	3	0
Scunthorpe United	2020–21	League Two	34	0	1	0	0	0	0	0	35	0
Carlisle United	2021–22	League Two	35	0	2	0	0	0	3	0	40	0
Wrexham	2022–23	National League	33	0	6	0	—		0	0	39	0
Wrexham	2023–24	League Two	7	0	1	0	2	0	0	0	10	0
Wrexham	2024–25	League One	10	0	0	0	0	0	1	0	11	0
Wrexham	Total		50	0	7	0	2	0	1	0	60	0
Salford City	2025–26	League Two	2	0	1	0	1	0	4	0	8	0
Career total			342	0	33	0	23	0	15	0	413	0

== Honours ==
Bolton Wanderers

- EFL League One runner-up: 2016–17

Wrexham

- National League: 2022–23
- EFL League Two runner-up: 2023–24
- EFL League One runner-up: 2024–25

Individual

- Carlisle United Player of the Year: 2021–22
