= David Barron (footballer) =

Scottish footballer

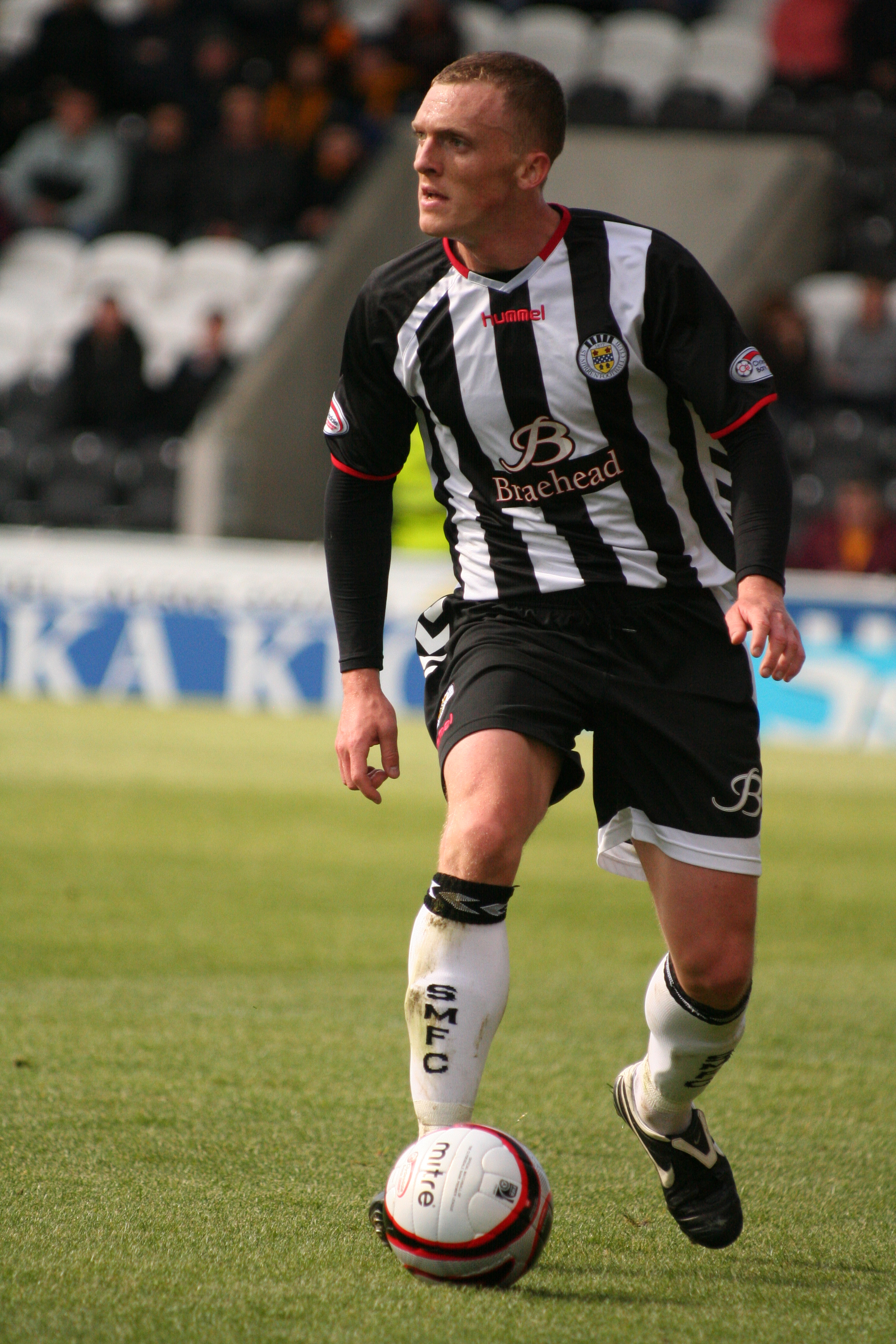

Personal information
- Full name: David Barron
- Date of birth: 10 September 1987 (age 39)
- Place of birth: Greenock, Scotland
- Height: 5 ft 11 in (1.80 m)
- Position: Utility player

Team information
- Current team: Pollok

Youth career
- Partick Thistle

Senior career*
Years	Team	Apps	(Gls)
2005–2014	St Mirren	99	(0)
2015	Greenock Juniors		
2015–2018	Stranraer	40	(0)
2018–2019	Hurlford United		
2019–	Pollok		
- * Club domestic league appearances and goals as of 22 May 2018 (UTC)

David Barron (born 10 September 1987) is a Scottish footballer, who plays for Pollok in the Lowland League West. He has previously played in the Scottish Premier League for St Mirren.

== Career ==
Barron signed for St Mirren after being released by Partick Thistle and rejected by a cash strapped Clyde team. In his first season at Love Street, a knee injury blighted Barron's season. Nonetheless, manager Gus MacPherson saw potential in him and offered him a new two-year contract.

Barron started his first league game for St Mirren in a no score draw against Kilmarnock at Love Street. Despite injury forcing his substitution at half time, he returned to the first team and scored his first goal against Dumbarton in the Scottish Cup. He managed a to retain his place for the remainder of the 2007–08 season after an injury to David van Zanten and cemented his place at right-back. After the departure of van Zanten to Hibernian at the end of the season, Barron was expected to become first choice right back at St Mirren, however former Falkirk captain, Jack Ross was signed in the close season and secured the right back position.

The signing of Jack Ross was compounded by medial ligament damage in his knee which saw him out of contention for 11 weeks and limited his outings in the 2008–09 season, not playing a game until the turn of the year. A similar injury to left back Franco Miranda saw Barron deployed in a variety of defensive positions, until left back Mo Camara was signed.

Following an injury to Mo Camara before the start of the 2009–10 season in a friendly against Wigan Athletic, Barron secured a first team starting spot at left back. Naturally right footed, Barron's preferred position is to the right of defence however he settled in well at left back and secured his place in St Mirren's team. His versatility in being able to play as a defensive midfielder, left and right full back as well as centre back means he has become an important defender in St Mirren's squad. He returned to his natural right back position towards the end of the season as Steven Robb returned from injury. At the end of the 2009–10 season, Barron picked up four club awards, including Young Player of the Year.

On 29 February 2012, Barron signed a new contract at St Mirren, keeping him at the club until summer 2014.

Barron terminated his contract with St Mirren by mutual consent on 20 January 2014. After a spell out of the game, Barron joined Greenock Juniors in January 2015.

On 21 August, Barron signed with Scottish League One side Stranraer on a six-month contract. He left the club in May 2018.

He joined Hurlford United in the summer of 2018.

After one year at Hurlford in the SJFA West Region Premiership, he joined Pollok on 19 June 2019.
