= 2009–10 Scottish League Cup =

2009–10 Co-operative Insurance Cup
Tournament details
- Country: Scotland
- Dates: 1 August 2009 – 21 March 2010
- Teams: 42

Final positions
- Champions: Rangers
- Runners-up: St Mirren

Tournament statistics
- Matches played: 41
- Goals scored: 151 (3.68 per match)

The 2009–10 Scottish League Cup was the 64th season of the Scotland's second most prestigious football knockout competition, also known for sponsorship reasons as the Co-operative Insurance Cup. Rangers won the cup beating St Mirren 1–0 thanks to a goal from Kenny Miller.

The format of the competition was changed due to six Scottish clubs qualifying for European competition, two SPL clubs entered in the First Round.

== Calendar ==
Round	First match date	Fixtures	Clubs
First round	Saturday 1 August 2009	16	32 → 16
Second round	Tuesday/Wednesday 25/26 August 2009	10	20 → 10
Third round	Tuesday/Wednesday 22/23 September 2009	8	16 → 8
Quarter-finals	Tuesday/Wednesday 27/28 October 2009	4	8 → 4
Semi-finals	Tuesday/Wednesday 3/4 February 2010	2	4 → 2
Final	Sunday 21 March 2010	1	2 → 1

Note: the 4 best placed SPL teams not competing in European competition enter the tournament in the 2nd round and the 6 teams who are competing in European competition enter the tournament in the 3rd round.

== First round ==
All 30 SFL clubs entered here, along with St Johnstone (as the team promoted to the SPL), and St Mirren (as the eleventh placed SPL team). The draw was held on 4 June 2009.

1 August 2009	Brechin City	4–0	Elgin City	Glebe Park, Brechin
15:00	McAllister 13', 63'; Byers 77'; McKenna 84'	Report		Attendance: 406; Referee: Thomas Robertson

1 August 2009	Queen's Park	1–4	Queen of the South	Hampden Park, Glasgow
15:00	Douglas 82'	Report	Quinn 1'; Wilson 10', 14'; Burns 70'	Attendance: 886; Referee: Craig Charleston

1 August 2009	Inverness Caledonian Thistle	4–0	Annan Athletic	Caledonian Stadium, Inverness
15:00	Rooney 21'; Eagle 52'; Imrie 72'; Sanchez 88'	Report		Attendance: 1,095; Referee: Alan Muir

1 August 2009	Stenhousemuir	0–5	St Johnstone	Ochilview Park, Stenhousemuir
15:00		Report	Milne 22'; Deuchar 28', 69'; Samuel 67', 74'	Attendance: 1,049; Referee: David Somers

1 August 2009	Ross County	5–0	Montrose	Victoria Park, Dingwall
15:00	Craig 43'; Gardyne 56', 75'; Morrison 72'; Stewart 79'	Report		Attendance: 768; Referee: Mike Tumilty

2 August 2009	East Stirlingshire	3–6	St Mirren	Ochilview Park, Stenhousemuir
15:00	McGuire 23'; Rodgers 27', 36'	Report	Mehmet 6', 13', 17', 44', 67'; O'Donnell 73'	Attendance: 1,024; Referee: Stevie O'Reilly

1 August 2009	Partick Thistle	5–1	Berwick Rangers	Firhill Stadium, Glasgow
15:00	Hodge 29'; Buchanan 49', 81' (pen.); Erskine 53', 87'	Report	Little 69'	Attendance: 1,472; Referee: Dougie McDonald

1 August 2009	East Fife	2–3	Raith Rovers	Bayview Stadium, Methil
15:00	Linn 5'; Muir 19'	Report	Walker 57'; Tadé 75'; Williamson 90'	Attendance: 1390; Referee: Steven McLean

1 August 2009	Dundee	5–0	Stranraer	Dens Park, Dundee
15:00	Higgins 23'; Harkins 29'; Cameron 37'; McMenamin 47'; Griffiths 67'	Report		Attendance: 2345; Referee: William Collum

1 August 2009	Stirling Albion	1–2 (a.e.t.)	Ayr United	Forthbank Stadium, Stirling
15:00	Devine 16'	Report	Easton 61'; A. Aitken 114'	Attendance: 802; Referee: Neil Watters

1 August 2009	Airdrie United	0–0 (a.e.t.) (3–4 p)	Alloa Athletic	New Broomfield, Airdrie
15:00		Report		Attendance: 756; Referee: Charlie Richmond

1 August 2009	Cowdenbeath	1–3	Morton	Central Park, Cowdenbeath
15:00	McQuade 31' (pen.)	Report	Weatherson 7', 51'; MacFarlane 12'	Attendance: 486; Referee: Brian Winter

1 August 2009	Peterhead	0–3	Arbroath	Balmoor, Peterhead
15:00		Report	Sellars 6'; Bishop 48'; Raeside 54'	Attendance: 499; Referee: Anthony Law

1 August 2009	Albion Rovers	3–0	Livingston	Cliftonhill, Coatbridge
15:00	McKenzie 9' (o.g.); Barr 48'; McCusker 89'	Report		Attendance: 602; Referee: Gary Hilland

1 August 2009	Clyde	1–3	Forfar Athletic	Broadwood Stadium, Cumbernauld
15:00	Tod 28' (o.g.)	Report	Campbell 51'; Fotheringham 58'; Deasley 65'	Attendance: 784; Referee: Craig Thomson

1 August 2009	Dumbarton	0–5	Dunfermline Athletic	Strathclyde Homes Stadium, Dumbarton
15:00	Chisholm (red card) 67'	Report	Graham 2'; Kirk 9', 56'; Burke 45'; Bell 65'	Attendance: 953; Referee: Chris Boyle

Source: BBC Sport

== Second round ==
The 16 winners of the first round entered here, along with the remaining 4 SPL clubs not to have qualified for Europe. These were Dundee United, Hibernian, Kilmarnock, and Hamilton Academical.

25 August	Inverness Caledonian Thistle	4–0	Albion Rovers	Caledonian Stadium, Inverness
19:45	Eagle 8'; Rooney 16'; Bulvītis 41'; Munro 57'	Report		Attendance: 681; Referee: Steven Nicholls

25 August	Forfar Athletic	2–4	Dundee	Station Park, Forfar
19:45	Tulloch 55'; R.Campbell 72'	Report	Griffiths 11'; Antoine-Curier 15', 31'; Tod 67' (o.g.)	Attendance: 1,929; Referee: Stevie O'Reilly

26 August	Dunfermline Athletic	3–1	Raith Rovers	East End Park, Dunfermline
19:45	Kirk 38', 68'; Campbell 52' (o.g.)	Report	Williamson 50' (pen.)	Attendance: 4,163; Referee: Brian Winter

26 August	Arbroath	0–6	St Johnstone	Gayfield Park, Arbroath
19:45		Report	Milne 24', 45'; Morais 27'; Deuchar 42', 67'; Samuel 71'	Attendance: 1,038; Referee: Steve Conroy

25 August	Partick Thistle	1–2	Queen of the South	Firhill Stadium, Glasgow
19:45	Donnelly 30'	Report	Weatherston 64', 90'	Attendance: 1,527; Referee: George Salmond

25 August	Alloa Athletic	0–2	Dundee United	Recreation Park, Alloa
19:45		Report	Shala 23'; Goodwillie 39'	Attendance: 1,000; Referee: Euan Norris

26 August	Hibernian	3–0	Brechin City	Easter Road, Edinburgh
19:45	Nimmo 11' (o.g.); Riordan 16'; Hanlon 55'	Report		Attendance: 7,047; Referee: Steven McLean

25 August	Ross County	2–1	Hamilton Academical	Victoria Park, Dingwall
19:30	Di Giacomo 32'; Brittain 53'	Report	Mensing 90+3'	Attendance: 764; Referee: Alan Muir

25 August	Kilmarnock	3–1	Greenock Morton	Rugby Park, Kilmarnock
19:45	Sammon 24' (pen.), 64'; Kyle 90'	Report	McGuffie 44' (pen.)	Attendance: 3,645; Referee: Mike Tumilty

26 August	Ayr United	0–2	St Mirren	Somerset Park, Ayr
19:45	Keenan (red card) 89'	Report	Higdon 25'; Mehmet 90'	Attendance: 1,652; Referee: Charlie Richmond

Source: BBC Sport

== Third round ==
The 10 winners of the second round entered here, along with the 6 Scottish clubs to have qualified for Europe. These were Rangers, Celtic, Heart of Midlothian, Aberdeen, Falkirk and Motherwell.

22 September	Dundee	3–2 (a.e.t.)	Aberdeen	Dens Park, Dundee
19:45	Malone 39'; Forsyth 55'; Griffiths 105'	Report	Paton 63', 88'	Attendance: 6131; Referee: Steve Conroy

23 September	Falkirk	0–4	Celtic	Falkirk Stadium, Falkirk
19:45		Report	McDonald 28', 53'; McCourt 64'; Killen 73'	Attendance: 5669; Referee: Mike Tumilty

23 September	Heart of Midlothian	2–1	Dunfermline Athletic	Tynecastle Stadium, Edinburgh
19:45	Glen 56'; Stewart 73' (pen.)	Report	Bayne 15'	Attendance: 6126; Referee: Brian Winter

22 September	Hibernian	1–3	St Johnstone	Easter Road, Edinburgh
19:45	Stokes 1'	Report	Swankie 7'; Millar 76'; Morris 82'	Attendance: 7078; Referee: Charlie Richmond

22 September	Kilmarnock	1–2	St Mirren	Rugby Park, Kilmarnock
19:45	Kyle 87'	Report	McGinn 64'; Dorman 90+3'	Attendance: 3561; Referee: Dougie McDonald

22 September	Motherwell	3–2 (a.e.t.)	Inverness Caledonian Thistle	Fir Park, Motherwell
19:45	McHugh 33'; Bulvītis 94' (o.g.); Forbes 119'	Report	Barrowman 70'; Munro 111'; Proctor (yellow card) 72' (red card)	Attendance: 3905; Referee: Alan Muir

23 September	Queen of the South	1–2	Rangers	Palmerston Park, Dumfries
19:35	Harris 90'	Report	Naismith 16'; Novo 79'	Attendance: 6120; Referee: William Collum

22 September	Ross County	0–2	Dundee United	Victoria Park, Dingwall
19:45	Scott (red card) 83'	Report	Wilkie 36'; Russell 77'	Attendance: 1986; Referee: Craig Thomson

Source: BBC Sport

== Quarter-finals ==
The quarter-final draw was conducted at Hampden Park, Glasgow on 24 September 2009. The ties were played in the week commencing 26 October.

27 October	Dundee	1–3	Rangers	Dens Park, Dundee
19:45	Griffiths 29'	Report	Whittaker 15'; MacKenzie 57' (o.g.); Fleck 85'	Attendance: 10654; Referee: Dougie McDonald

27 October	St Johnstone	2–1	Dundee United	McDiarmid Park, Perth
19:45	Anderson 72'; Dods 76' (o.g.)	Report	Buaben 82'	Attendance: 5146; Referee: Steve Conroy

27 October	St Mirren	3–0	Motherwell	St Mirren Park, Paisley
19:45	Higdon 23'; Ross 61'; Craigan 81' (o.g.)	Report		Attendance: 4325; Referee: William Collum

28 October	Celtic	0–1	Heart of Midlothian	Celtic Park, Glasgow
19:35	McManus (red card) 90'	Report	Stewart 58' (pen)	Attendance: 18675; Referee: Craig Thomson

Source: BBC Sport

== Semi-finals ==
The semi-final draw was conducted at Tynecastle Stadium, Edinburgh on 9 November 2009. The ties were played in the week commencing 1 February 2010.

2 February	Heart of Midlothian	0–1	St Mirren	Fir Park, Motherwell
19:45		Report	Mehmet 51'	Attendance: 9,170; Referee: Charlie Richmond

3 February	Rangers	2–0	St Johnstone	Hampden Park, Glasgow
19:35	Davis 26'; McCulloch 37'	Report		Attendance: 17,371; Referee: Dougie McDonald

Source: BBC Sport

== Final ==
The Final took place on Sunday 21 March.

21 March	St Mirren	0–1	Rangers	Hampden Park, Glasgow
15:00		Report	Thomson (red card) 53'; Wilson (red card) 71'; Miller 84'	Attendance: 44,538; Referee: Craig Thomson

== Awards ==
A team, player and young player were chosen by the Scottish sports press as the top performers in each round.

Round	Team	Player	Young player	Ref
R1			Chris Erskine (Partick Thistle)	
R2	Ross County	David Weatherston (Queen of the South)	Paul Hanlon (Hibernian)	
R3	Dundee	Paddy McCourt (Celtic)	Leigh Griffiths (Dundee)	
QF	Heart of Midlthian	Andy Dorman (St Mirren)	John Fleck (Rangers)	
SF	St Mirren	Billy Mehmet (St Mirren)	Danny Wilson (Rangers)	

== Media coverage ==
The 2009/10 Scottish League Cup was shown live in the UK on BBC One Scotland and in Ireland on Setanta Ireland and Setanta Sports 1. In Australia it was shown live on Setanta Sports Australia. In US, The Caribbean and Canada it was broadcast live on Setanta Premium.
