= Chris Smith (footballer, born 1986) =

Scottish footballer (born 1986)

Personal information
- Full name: Wallace Christopher Smith
- Date of birth: 5 March 1986 (age 40)
- Place of birth: Glasgow, Scotland
- Position: Goalkeeper

Senior career*
Years	Team	Apps	(Gls)
2004–2010	St Mirren	78	(0)
2009	→ Dunfermline Athletic (loan)	3	(0)
2010	→ Dunfermline Athletic (loan)	6	(0)
2010–2012	Dunfermline Athletic	51	(0)
2012–2013	St Mirren	0	(0)
2013	→ Stenhousemuir (loan)	7	(0)
2013–2015	Stenhousemuir	36	(0)
2015–2017	Stirling Albion	65	(0)
2017–2018	Stenhousemuir	30	(0)
2018–2019	East Kilbride	0	(0)
2018–2019	→ Dumbarton (loan)	9	(0)
2019–2020	Annan Athletic	10	(0)
2020–2021	Dumbarton	2	(0)

International career
2007–2008	Scotland U21	2	(0)
- * Club domestic league appearances and goals

Wallace Christopher Smith (born 5 March 1986) is a Scottish retired professional footballer who last played as a goalkeeper for Scottish League One side Dumbarton before switching his footballing career to be a police officer.

Smith has previously played for St Mirren, Dunfermline Athletic, Stenhousemuir, Stirling Albion, East Kilbride, Dumbarton (on loan) and Annan Athletic.

== Career ==
Smith, a goalkeeper born in Glasgow, progressed through the youth ranks at St Mirren. He helped the club win two trophies in 2005–06, when St Mirren won the 2005 Scottish Challenge Cup Final and the 2005–06 Scottish First Division championship.

He then signed a contract to keep him at St Mirren until the summer of 2011. Following the departure of Tony Bullock and Craig Hinchliffe, he became the first-choice goalkeeper for the Buddies, although he suffered a cruciate ligament injury in March 2009. He was a regular in the Scotland under-21 squad. For the 2009–10 season, Smith's number 1 shirt was given to new signing Paul Gallacher and he was given 30 instead.

On 1 December 2009, Smith was loaned to Dunfermline Athletic in the Scottish Football League First Division for a month. Smith played three times for the Pars before breaking his foot and returning to St Mirren. He re-joined Dunfermline for a second loan spell later in the season. He then joined Dunfermline outright, on a one-year deal for the 2010–11 season. Smith played regularly for Dunfermline in the latter part of the 2011–12 Scottish Premier League season, due to injuries suffered by Paul Gallacher and Iain Turner. Dunfermline released him at the end of the season.

Smith signed for St Mirren in August 2012, providing cover after Grant Adam suffered a tibia injury.

On 22 March 2013, Smith was loaned out to Second Division Stenhousemuir until the end of season 2012–13. At the end of the 2014–15 season, Smith agreed terms with Stirling Albion. Smith spent two seasons with the Binos before being released in May 2017. Smith subsequently re-signed for Stenhousemuir in June 2017. He joined East Kilbride in the summer of 2018, before joining Scottish League One side Dumbarton on loan in October 2018 after Grant Adam was ruled out through injury. After five appearances he left the club in November 2018, before returning three weeks later again on an emergency loan deal. He joined Scottish League Two side Annan Athletic in November 2019 after impressing as a trialist. He joined Dumbarton for a second time, this time on a permanent deal, in October 2020. He left the club due to work commitments on 6 April 2021.

== Personal life ==
Outside of football, Smith works as a police officer in Glasgow.

== Career statistics ==
As of 17:28, 27 March 2021 (UTC)

Appearances and goals by club, season and competition
Club	Season	League			Scottish Cup		League Cup		Other		Total	
Club	Season	Division	Apps	Goals	Apps	Goals	Apps	Goals	Apps	Goals	Apps	Goals
St Mirren	2004–05	First Division	2	0	0	0	0	0	0	0	2	0
St Mirren	2005–06	First Division	23	0	1	0	1	0	3 (Note: Appearances in the Scottish Challenge Cup)	0	28	0
St Mirren	2006–07	Premier League	21	0	0	0	1	0	—		22	0
St Mirren	2007–08	Premier League	28	0	4	0	1	0	—		33	0
St Mirren	2008–09	Premier League	4	0	2	0	0	0	—		6	0
St Mirren	St Mirren total		78	0	7	0	3	0	3	0	91	0
Dunfermline Athletic (loan)	2009–10	First Division	8	0	0	0	0	0	0	0	8	0
Dunfermline Athletic	2010–11	First Division	36	0	2	0	2	0	0	0	40	0
Dunfermline Athletic	2011–12	Premier League	15	0	2	0	0	0	—		17	0
Dunfermline Athletic	Dunfermline total		51	0	4	0	2	0	0	0	57	0
Stenhousemuir (loan)	2012–13	Second Division	7	0	0	0	0	0	0	0	7	0
Stenhousemuir	2013–14	League One	36	0	4	0	1	0	1	0	42	0
Stenhousemuir	2014–15	League One	0	0	0	0	0	0	0	0	0	0
Stenhousemuir	Stenhousemuir total		36	0	4	0	1	0	1	0	42	0
Stirling Albion	2015–16	League Two	34	0	5	0	1	0	1	0	41	0
Stirling Albion	2016–17	League Two	31	0	3	0	3	0	0	0	37	0
Stirling Albion	Stirling total		65	0	8	0	4	0	1	0	78	0
Stenhousemuir	2017–18	League Two	30	0	2	0	3	0	5	0	40	0
Dumbarton (loan)	2018–19	League One	9	0	1	0	0	0	0	0	10	0
Annan Athletic	2019–20	League Two	10	0	1	0	0	0	0	0	11	0
Dumbarton	2020–21	League One	2	0	1	0	0	0	0	0	3	0
Career total			298	0	28	0	13	0	10	0	347	0
