= 2008–09 St Mirren F.C. season =

St Mirren
2008–09 season
- Chairman: Stewart Gilmour
- Manager: Gus McPherson
- SPL: 10th
- Scottish Cup: Semi-finals (lost to Rangers)
- League Cup: Third round (lost to Dunfermline Athletic)
- Top goalscorer: League: Andy Dorman (10); All: Andy Dorman (12); Billy Mehmet (12)
- Highest home attendance: 10,189 vs Motherwell (3 January 2009)
- Lowest home attendance: 3,364 vs Inverness Caledonian Thistle (13 December 2008)
- Average home league attendance: 5,411
Home colours

St Mirren competed in the Scottish Premier League, after finishing in tenth place in 2007–08. The 2008–09 season also saw the club leave Love Street for the new St Mirren Park in Greenhill Road.

== Transfers ==
=== In ===
Date	Player	From	Fee	Source
20 June 2008	(Argentina) Franco Miranda	(Argentina) CAI	Loan	BBC
30 June 2008	(Scotland) Dennis Wyness	(Scotland) Inverness CT	Free Transfer	BBC
30 June 2008	(Scotland) Jack Ross	(Scotland) Falkirk	Free Transfer	BBC
30 June 2008	(Scotland) Steven Robb	(Scotland) Dundee United	Free Transfer	BBC
30 June 2008	(Scotland) Tom Brighton	(England) Millwall	Free Transfer	BBC
4 August 2008	(Spain) Tonet	Unattached	Free Transfer	BBC
14 August 2008	(Scotland) Scott Cuthbert	(Scotland) Celtic	Loan	BBC
1 January 2009	(Scotland) Steven Thomson	(England) Brighton & Hove Albion	Free Transfer	BBC

=== Out ===
Date	Player	To	Fee	Source
30 June 2008	(Scotland) Stewart Kean	(Scotland) Queen of the South	Free Transfer	BBC
30 June 2008	(Scotland) Ian Maxwell	(Scotland) Partick Thistle	Free Transfer	BBC
30 June 2008	(Scotland) Mark Corcoran	(Scotland) Hamilton Academical	Free Transfer	BBC
30 June 2008	(Republic of Ireland) David van Zanten	(Scotland) Hibernian	Free Transfer	BBC
30 June 2008	(Scotland) Richard Brittain	(Scotland) Ross County	Free Transfer	BBC
30 June 2008	(Scotland) Alan Reid		Released	BBC

== Results ==
=== Scottish Premier League ===
Date	Opponent	Venue	Result	Attendance	St Mirren Scorer(s)
10 August 2008	Celtic	Celtic Park	0–1	57,441	
16 August 2008	Kilmarnock	Love Street	0–0	4,176	
23 August 2008	Hearts	Tynecastle	1–2	13,357	Mehmet
30 August 2008	Aberdeen	Love Street	0–1	4,680	
13 September 2008	Inverness CT	Caledonian Stadium	2–1	3,501	Mehmet, Brady
20 September 2008	Falkirk	Love Street	1–1	4,134	Mehmet (pen.)
27 September 2008	Motherwell	Fir Park	1–2	4,786	Mehmet
5 October 2008	Rangers	Love Street	1–0	7,520	McGinn
18 October 2008	Hamilton	New Douglas Park	2–1	3,397	Miranda, Mehmet
25 October 2008	Dundee United	Tannadice	0–2	11,378	
1 November 2008	Hibernian	Love Street	0–0	4,588	
8 November 2008	Hearts	Love Street	0–1	4,192	
11 November 2008	Aberdeen	Pittodrie	0–2	9,452	
15 November 2008	Rangers	Ibrox	1–2	49,321	Miranda
22 November 2008	Celtic	Love Street	1–3	7,433	Hamilton
29 November 2008	Dundee United	Love Street	0–2	4,013	
6 December 2008	Falkirk	Falkirk Stadium	2–1	4,828	Hamilton, Wyness
13 December 2008	Inverness CT	Love Street	2–0	3,364	Dorman, Brady
20 December 2008	Kilmarnock	Rugby Park	1–0	5,183	Dorman
27 December 2008	Hamilton	Love Street	1–0	4,794	Dargo
3 January 2009	Motherwell	Love Street	0–0	10,189	
17 January 2009	Hibernian	Easter Road	0–2	10,317	
24 January 2009	Dundee United	Tannadice	2–3	6,556	Ross, Mehmet (pen.)
31 January 2009	Kilmarnock	New St Mirren Park	1–1	7,542	Wyness
14 February 2009	Falkirk	New St Mirren Park	2–2	5,504	Dorman (2)
21 February 2009	Hearts	Tynecastle	1–1	13,609	Dorman
28 February 2009	Celtic	Celtic Park	0–7	52,500	
4 March 2009	Aberdeen	New St Mirren Park	1–1	4,383	Dargo
21 March 2009	Hamilton	New Douglas Park	0–0	3,072	
4 April 2009	Inverness CT	Caledonian Stadium	1–2	3,794	Dorman
8 April 2009	Rangers	New St Mirren Park	1–2	6,231	Dorman
13 April 2009	Hibernian	New St Mirren Park	1–1	5,151	Dorman
18 April 2009	Motherwell	Fir Park	2–0	6,626	Thomson, Dorman
2 May 2009	Inverness CT	New St Mirren Park	1–2	4,171	Hamilton
9 May 2009	Motherwell	New St Mirren Park	1–3	4,002	O'Donnell
13 May 2009	Kilmarnock	Rugby Park	1–2	5,927	Wyness
16 May 2009	Falkirk	Falkirk Stadium	2–0	6,744	Mehmet, Dorman
23 May 2009	Hamilton	New St Mirren Park	0–1	6,747	

=== Scottish Cup ===
Date	Round	Opponent	Venue	Result	Attendance	St Mirren Scorer(s)
13 January 2009	R4	Brechin City	Glebe Park	3–1	1,026	Hamilton (2), Wyness
7 February 2009	R5	Motherwell	Fir Park	1–1	5,695	Dorman
17 February 2009	R5 (Replay)	Motherwell	St Mirren Park	1–0	4,555	Mehmet
7 March 2009	Quarter-final	Celtic	St Mirren Park	1–0	5,925	Mehmet (pen.)
25 April 2009	Semi-final	Rangers	Hampden Park	0–3	32,431	

=== League Cup ===
Date	Round	Opponent	Venue	Result	Attendance	St Mirren Scorer(s)
26/08/08	R2	Dumbarton	Love Street	7–0	1,747	Robb, Mehmet (3), Dorman, Dargo, Mason
23/09/08	R3	Dunfermline Athletic	East End Park	0–2	2,186	

=== Friendlies ===
Date	Opponent	Venue	Result	Attendance	St Mirren Scorer(s)
22 July 2008	Dumbarton	Strathclyde Homes Stadium	2–2		Brady, Molloy
23 July 2008	Stirling Albion	Forthbank Stadium	3–1		Hamilton (2), Dorman
26 July 2008	Morton (Renfrewshire Cup)	Cappielow	1–1 (5–4 on penalties)		McAusland
29 July 2008	Blackpool	Bloomfield Road	2–0		Tonet, Wyness
2 August 2008	Darlington	TFM Darlington Arena	1–0		Mehmet

== Competitions ==
=== Overall ===
Competition	Started round	Final position / round	First match	Last match
Scottish Premier League	—	11	18 August 2008	23 May 2009
League Cup	3rd Round	3rd Round	26 August 2008	23 September 2008
Scottish Cup	4th Round	Semi-finals	13 January 2009	25 April 2009

Source: Competitions

=== SPL ===
==== Classification ====
Pos	Team	Pld	W	D	L	GF	GA	GD	Pts	Qualification or relegation (Note: Teams played each other three times (33 matches), before the league split into two groups (the top six and the bottom six) for the last five matches.)
8	Kilmarnock	38	12	8	18	38	48	−10	44	
9	Hamilton Academical	38	12	5	21	30	53	−23	41	
10	Falkirk	38	9	11	18	37	52	−15	38	Qualification for the Europa League second qualifying round (Note: Since Rangers, the winners of the Scottish Cup, already qualified for the Champions League via their league position, Falkirk, the losing finalist, earned a spot in the Europa League.)
11	St Mirren	38	9	10	19	33	52	−19	37	
12	Inverness Caledonian Thistle (R)	38	10	7	21	37	58	−21	37	Relegation to the First Division

Source: Scottish Professional Football League
Rules for classification: 1) Points; 2) Goal difference; 3) Goals scored
(R) Relegated

==== Results summary ====
Overall								Home						Away					
Pld	W	D	L	GF	GA	GD	Pts	W	D	L	GF	GA	GD	W	D	L	GF	GA	GD
38	9	10	19	33	52	−19	37	3	8	8	14	21	−7	6	2	11	19	31	−12

Source: BBC Sport

==== Results by round ====
Round	1	2	3	4	5	6	7	8	9	10	11	12	13	14	15	16	17	18	19	20	21	22	23	24	25	26	27	28	29	30	31	32	33	34	35	36	37	38
Ground	A	H	A	H	A	H	A	H	A	A	H	H	A	A	H	H	A	H	A	H	H	A	A	H	H	A	A	H	A	A	H	H	A	H	H	A	A	H
Result	L	D	L	L	W	D	L	W	W	L	D	L	L	L	L	L	W	W	W	W	D	L	L	D	D	D	L	D	D	L	L	D	W	L	L	L	W	L

Source: BBC Sport
A = Away; H = Home; W = Win; D = Draw; L = Loss

== See also ==
- List of St Mirren F.C. seasons
