= Stephen McGinn =

Scottish footballer (born 1988)

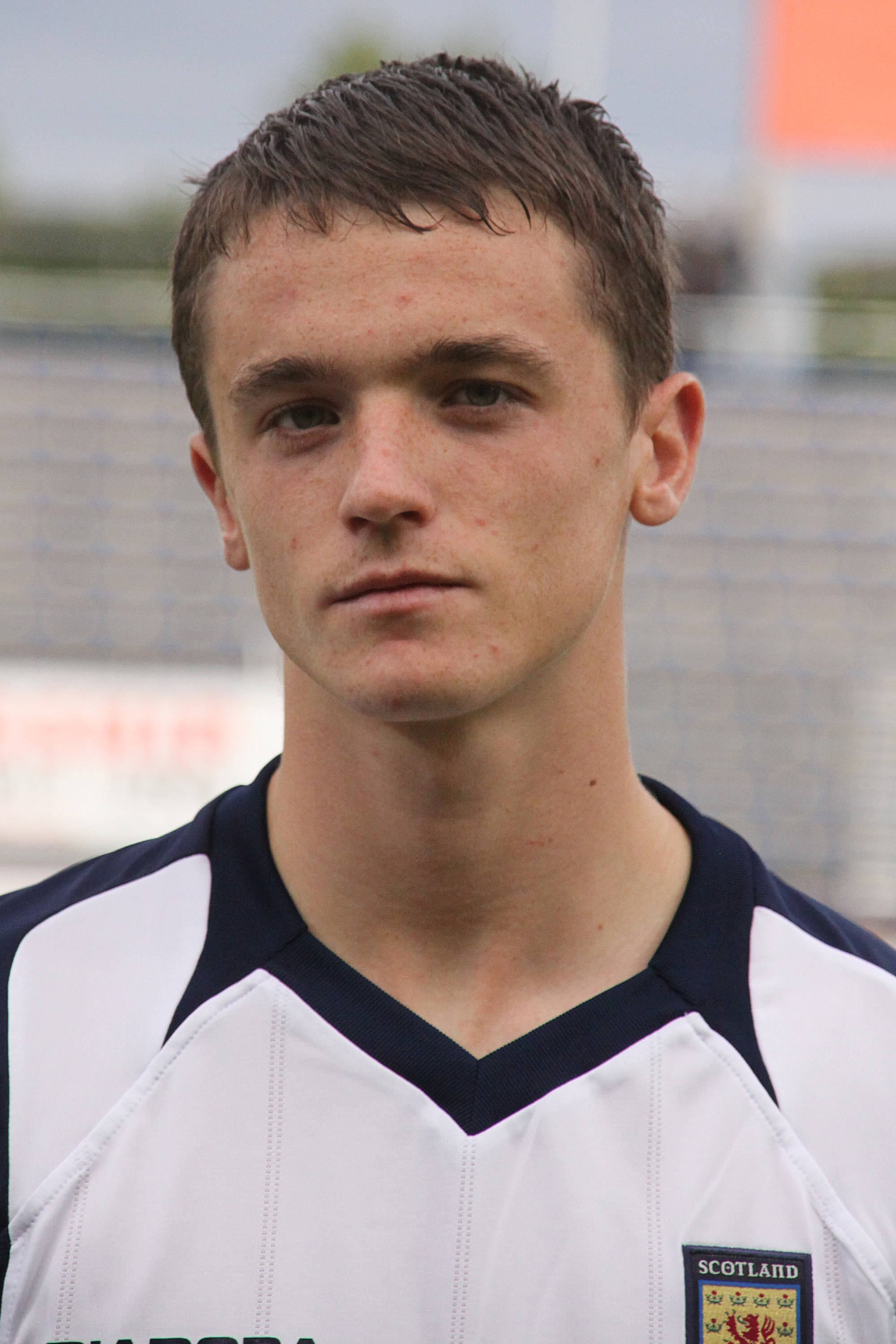
- McGinn with Scotland U21s in 2009

Personal information
- Date of birth: 2 December 1988 (age 37)
- Place of birth: Glasgow, Scotland
- Position: Midfielder

Team information
- Current team: Falkirk (first-team coach)

Youth career
- 1995–2006: St Mirren Boys Club

Senior career*
Years	Team	Apps	(Gls)
2006–2010	St Mirren	74	(7)
2010–2013	Watford	38	(2)
2013	→ Shrewsbury Town (loan)	18	(2)
2013–2015	Sheffield United	30	(0)
2015	→ Dundee (loan)	1	(0)
2015	Dundee	12	(1)
2015–2017	Wycombe Wanderers	31	(1)
2017–2020	St Mirren	93	(4)
2020–2021	Hibernian	5	(1)
2021	→ Greenock Morton (loan)	8	(0)
2021–2022	Kilmarnock	35	(1)
2022–2024	Falkirk	47	(3)
Total		390	(22)

International career
2007	Scotland U19	1	(0)
2009–2010	Scotland U21	8	(1)
- * Club domestic league appearances and goals as of 17:00, 4 May 2024 (UTC)

Stephen McGinn (born 2 December 1988) is a Scottish former professional footballer who played as a midfielder. He is currently a first-team coach at Scottish Premiership club Falkirk.

McGinn began his career with St Mirren in his native Scotland, before moving south of the border to sign for English Championship side Watford where he spent three and a half years but was on the sidelines for over a year due to a knee injury and was loaned to Shrewsbury Town upon his return to fitness. He moved to Sheffield United in June 2013, leaving the club in February 2015. After a short stint with Dundee, McGinn then had 18 months with Wycombe Wanderers.

McGinn returned to St Mirren in January 2017 and helped them win promotion in 2017–18. He left St Mirren during the 2020 close season, and played for Hibernian and Morton during the 2020–21 season. McGinn signed for Kilmarnock in June 2021, and helped them win the 2021–22 Scottish Championship. He then moved to Falkirk, where he captained the team that went unbeaten during the 2023–24 Scottish League One season before retiring at the end of the season and taking a role as a youth coach at St Mirren. Ahead of the 2025/26 season, he left St Mirren to return to Falkirk under the management of John McGlynn, this time as first-team coach.

McGinn also represented Scotland at under-19 and under-21 level. His brothers Paul and John also became professional footballers, who also played for St Mirren and Hibernian.

== Club career ==
=== St Mirren ===
Born in Glasgow and raised in Clydebank, McGinn started out at St Mirren FCBC (formerly the Football Club's Boys Club, now Youth Football Club), aged seven. He signed professional forms with St Mirren in July 2006, making his debut as a substitute on 1 January 2007 against Inverness Caledonian Thistle. His first full appearance was in a 5–1 loss to Celtic on 20 January 2007, also scoring his first goal.

For the 2007–08 season, McGinn started on bench before making his first start of the season against Celtic at Parkhead on 8 December, he scored the opening goal in a 1–1 draw. His second goal of the season came as the only goal against Hearts. He made his first ever Scottish Cup appearance against Dumbarton on 12 January 2008, coming on in the 88 minute.

McGinn was named in the starting XI for the 2008–09 season, making a start against Celtic on the opening day. On 5 October 2008, he scored a vital goal against Rangers, where St Mirren won 1–0, the team's first home league win over Rangers in 22 years.

McGinn started the 2009–10 season on bench in the Scottish League Cup game but then went on to score on his first start of the season in a 2–1 loss to Hibernian on 15 August 2009. He continued his season with a brace against Kilmarnock at Rugby Park, where The Buddies came from behind to win 2–1.

=== Watford ===
McGinn signed for Watford in January 2010, for an undisclosed fee. He made his first Watford appearance as a substitute against Newcastle United on 27 February 2010, and finished the season making two starts and seven sub appearances.

The following season McGinn established himself as a first-team regular for Watford, missing just four games between August and the end of February, before damaging his knee ligaments in a 1–1 draw against Doncaster Rovers. He was ruled out for the rest of the season and underwent knee surgery. McGinn returned to fitness a year later, playing 45 minutes in a reserve game, insisting afterwards that he felt good and stronger than when he got injured.

In July 2012, McGinn signed a new contract to keep him at Vicarage Road for another year, with a one-year option held by the Hornets to extend the deal.

Having failed to make an appearance for Watford during the first half of the following season, in January McGinn signed for Shrewsbury Town on loan until the end of April. He scored his first goal for Shrewsbury in a 2–1 home loss to Sheffield United on 9 February. In June 2013, Watford announced that McGinn's contract would not be renewed and that he was due to be released as a free agent.

=== Sheffield United ===
Following his release from Watford, McGinn signed for League One side Sheffield United in June 2013, agreeing a two-year contract with the option of a third year. McGinn made his debut for the Blades in the opening fixture of the following season, in a 2–1 home win against Notts County. Having been allowed to join Dundee on loan on 30 January 2015, McGinn's contract was then cancelled by Sheffield United on 2 February 2015.

=== Dundee ===
On 30 January 2015, McGinn moved on loan to Dundee for the rest of the season. He joined his younger brother Paul at the Dens Park club. On 2 February 2015, he signed permanently for Dundee after his Sheffield United contract was cancelled by mutual consent.

=== Wycombe Wanderers ===
On 4 August 2015, McGinn joined League Two side, Wycombe Wanderers after a successful trial with the club. He signed a two-year contract, live on Sky Sports News HQ's 92Live programme. On 13 February 2016, McGinn scored his first goal for Wycombe, the only goal in a league win against Exeter City at Adams Park. On 25 January 2017, McGinn left Wycombe Wanderers after his contract was cancelled by mutual consent.

=== St Mirren (second spell) ===
McGinn signed an 18-month contract with St Mirren in January 2017, and played a major part in helping the club avoid relegation. He captained the club in season 2017–18, and was influential in helping Saints win the Scottish Championship title. After gaining promotion, McGinn then signed a two-year contract extension in April 2018. In June 2020, McGinn left Saints when his contract expired.

=== Hibernian ===
In September 2020, McGinn signed a contract with Hibernian that ran until the end of the 2020–21 season.

==== Greenock Morton (loan) ====
In March 2021, McGinn joined Greenock Morton on loan until the end of the season.

=== Kilmarnock ===
McGinn signed for Kilmarnock in June 2021. He would enjoy a successful season and win the Scottish Championship with Killie.

=== Falkirk ===
On 9 June 2022, McGinn signed for Scottish League One side Falkirk on a one-year deal with an option for a one-year extension. In March 2024, McGinn won the League One title with the Bairns on the same night they destroyed Montrose at Links Park. Having led Falkirk to an unbeaten league season as club captain, the club confirmed that McGinn would leave at the end of his contract in the summer of 2024. Soon afterwards McGinn announced his retirement from playing football.

== Coaching career ==
A week after retiring from playing, McGinn was announced as the U18s coach at his old youth club St Mirren's youth academy.

On 30 May 2025, McGinn left his role at St Mirren to take up the position of first-team coach at Falkirk, the club he previously captained to an Invincible title-winning season, ahead of their return to the Premiership.

== International career ==
McGinn played for Scotland under-19s in a goalless draw against Slovakia in 2007, and marked his debut for the under-21s by scoring in a 5–2 win against Albania in April 2009. He went on to make a total of 8 appearances at under-21 level.

== Personal life ==
McGinn was born to parents Stephen and Mary, a teacher. His grandfather, Jack McGinn, was Celtic chairman and Scottish Football Association president.

McGinn was raised in Duntocher alongside his three younger siblings, Paul and twins John and Katie. His brothers are also professional footballers. Between May 2018 and January 2020, Stephen and Paul both represented St Mirren, and the brothers were in the same squad at Hibernian for the 2020–21 season. John has also represented both clubs, and like Stephen came through the youth system at St Mirren.

In 2020, McGinn became a father for the first time.

== Career statistics ==
As of 4 May 2024

Appearances and goals by club, season and competition
Club	Season	League			National cup		League cup		Other		Total	
Club	Season	Division	Apps	Goals	Apps	Goals	Apps	Goals	Apps	Goals	Apps	Goals
St Mirren	2006–07	2006-07 Scottish Premier League	4	1	0	0	0	0	—		4	1
St Mirren	2007–08	2007-08 Scottish Premier League	25	2	3	0	0	0	—		28	2
St Mirren	2008–09	2008-09 Scottish Premier League	28	1	3	0	1	0	—		32	1
St Mirren	2009–10	2009-10 Scottish Premier League	18	3	1	0	3 (Note: Includes one appearance not recorded on Soccerbase or Soccerway. "Ayr 0-2 St Mirren". BBC Sport. 26 August 2009.)	1	—		22	4
St Mirren	Total		75	7	7	0	4	1	0	0	86	8
Watford	2009–10	Championship	9	0	0	0	0	0	—		9	0
Watford	2010–11	Championship	29	2	2	0	2	0	—		33	2
Watford	2011–12	Championship	0	0	0	0	0	0	—		0	0
Watford	2012–13	Championship	0	0	0	0	0	0	—		0	0
Watford	Total		38	2	2	0	2	0	0	0	42	2
Shrewsbury Town (loan)	2012–13	League One	18	2	0	0	0	0	0	0	18	2
Sheffield United	2013–14	League One	30	0	7	0	0	0	1	0	38	0
Sheffield United	2014–15	League One	0	0	0	0	2	0	2	0	4	0
Sheffield United	Total		30	0	7	0	2	0	3	0	42	0
Dundee	2014–15 (Note: Note: McGinn made one appearance after signing on loan before signing permanently on 2 February 2015.)	Scottish Premiership	13	1	1	0	0	0	—		14	1
Wycombe Wanderers	2015–16	League Two	26	1	2	0	1	0	1	0	30	1
Wycombe Wanderers	2016–17	League Two	5	0	0	0	1	0	4	1	10	1
Wycombe Wanderers	Total		31	1	2	0	2	0	5	1	40	2
St Mirren	2016–17	Scottish Championship	15	2	2	0	0	0	2	1	19	3
St Mirren	2017–18	Scottish Championship	35	1	2	0	4	0	2	0	43	1
St Mirren	2018–19	Scottish Premiership	34	1	1	0	5	2	2	0	42	3
St Mirren	2019–20	Scottish Premiership	9	0	0	0	3	0	—		12	0
St Mirren	Total		93	4	5	0	12	2	6	1	116	7
Hibernian	2020–21	Scottish Premiership	5	1	0	0	4	0	—		9	1
Greenock Morton (loan)	2020–21	Scottish Championship	8	0	1	0	0	0	—		9	0
Kilmarnock	2021–22	Scottish Championship	32	1	0	0	5	0	4 (Note: Appearances in Scottish Challenge Cup)	0	41	1
Falkirk	2022–23	Scottish League One	34	3	5	0	4	0	4 (Note: Counting two appearances in the Challenge Cup and two appearances in the Scottish Championship play-offs)	0	47	3
Falkirk	2023–24	Scottish League One	13	0	0	0	4	0	0	0	17	0
Falkirk	Total		47	3	5	0	8	0	4	0	64	3
Career total			389	22	30	0	38	3	26	2	483	27

== Honours ==
St Mirren

- Scottish Championship: 2017–18

Kilmarnock

- Scottish Championship: 2021–22

Falkirk

- Scottish League One: 2023–24
