= Ryan McCay =

Scottish footballer

Personal information
- Full name: Ryan McCay
- Date of birth: 4 May 1986 (age 40)
- Place of birth: Paisley, Scotland
- Position: Defender

Senior career*
Years	Team	Apps	(Gls)
2004–2009	St Mirren	28	(1)
2007–2008	→ Stirling Albion (loan)	4	(0)
2008	→ Cowdenbeath (loan)	1	(0)
2008–2009	→ Montrose (loan)	2	(0)
- * Club domestic league appearances and goals as of 11:05, 20 January 2009 (UTC)~

Ryan McCay (born 4 May 1986 in Paisley) is a Scottish footballer. He most recently played for Montrose, on loan from the Scottish Premier League side St Mirren.

He has made 10 starting appearances for the Saints, and a further 39 as a substitute. He was unable to play for most of the season 2005–06 due to injury. He scored his only goal for the Buddies against Hearts at Tynecastle in a 3–2 defeat. He signed a one-year extension to his contract before being sent on loan to Stirling Albion. McCay was told in January 2009 that he was free to look for another club (along with Craig Molloy), whilst on loan at Montrose, as his contract would not be renewed in the summer.
