= Tony Bullock =

English footballer

Personal information
- Full name: Anthony Brian Bullock
- Date of birth: 18 February 1972 (age 54)
- Place of birth: Warrington, England
- Position: Goalkeeper

Team information
- Current team: Montrose (Goalkeeping coach)

Senior career*
Years	Team	Apps	(Gls)
1992–1993	Northwich Victoria	37	(0)
1992–1993	→ Hyde United (loan)	3	(0)
1996–1997	Leek Town		
1997–2000	Barnsley	38	(0)
2000–2001	Macclesfield Town	24	(0)
2001	Lincoln City	2	(0)
2001–2003	Ross County	69	(0)
2003–2005	Dundee United	31	(0)
2005–2006	Gillingham	6	(0)
2006–2007	St Mirren	29	(0)
2007–2009	Ross County	40	(0)
2009	Montrose	16	(0)
2009–2010	Dundee	19	(0)
2010–2012	Livingston	34	(0)
2012–2013	Arbroath	10	(0)
2013–2014	Airdrieonians	0	(0)
Total		358	(0)
- * Club domestic league appearances and goals as of 18:15, 4 February 2014 (UTC)

Anthony Brian Bullock (born 18 February 1972) is an English former professional footballer who played as a goalkeeper and is currently goalkeeping coach at Montrose.

== Club career ==
Born in Warrington, Bullock joined Northwich Victoria from local club Winnington Avenue F.C.. In August 1992, he joined Hyde United on loan, debuting in the 1-1 Northern Premier League draw at Goole Town on 22 August 1992 and appearing twice more for the club before returning to the Drill Field. He moved on to join Leek Town before signing for Barnsley in March 1997. He struggled to hold down a regular first team place and left for Macclesfield Town in 2000 on a free transfer.

On 22 March 2001 he became Alan Buckley's first signing for Lincoln City when the Sincil Bank based club agreed to take over his contract until the end of the season. His debut came five days later in the 1–0 defeat at Hartlepool United but he failed to displace Alan Marriott permanently and, after one final appearance, was released by the club at the end of the season.

He moved to Scotland to sign for Ross County in July 2001. A successful spell with County brought him a move to Dundee United in 2003, where his final game was the 2005 Scottish Cup final defeat to Celtic, before he returned to England with Gillingham. After only five months with Gillingham, Bullock signed for St Mirren in January 2006, but he failed to cement a first-team place and was released in May 2007.

He rejoined Ross County in June 2007, along with Stuart Golabek.

Bullock was Steven Tweed's first signing for Montrose.

He then signed for Dundee on a pre-contract agreement and joined his new teammates for pre-season training ahead of the 2009–10 season on 1 July 2009. After one season with the club, he was released by the club on 4 May 2010 along with 8 other players.

Bullock signed for Livingston in 2010.

In June 2012, Bullock signed for Arbroath in a player-coach role.

On 25 September, Bullock left Arbroath, with manager Paul Sheerin saying "He has had a sense of frustration about football for a while now and reckons that it is best that he takes a break from it."

On 1 November 2013, Bullock signed for Scottish League One side Airdrieonians, making his debut the same day in a 3–0 defeat against Rangers in the Scottish Cup. This turned out to be his only appearance for the club and he then retired from playing and took up a role as their goalkeeping coach. He left Airdrieonians in October 2014. In June 2019, having been coaching at Broughty Athletic, he was appointed goalkeeper coach at Montrose which saw Bullock renew acquaintance with manager Stewart Petrie who he had played with at Ross County and coached with at Arbroath.

== Honours ==
St Mirren

- Scottish First Division Winner: 1

2005–06

Dundee United

- Scottish Cup Runner-up: 1

2004–05
