= Michael Higdon =

English footballer (born 1983)

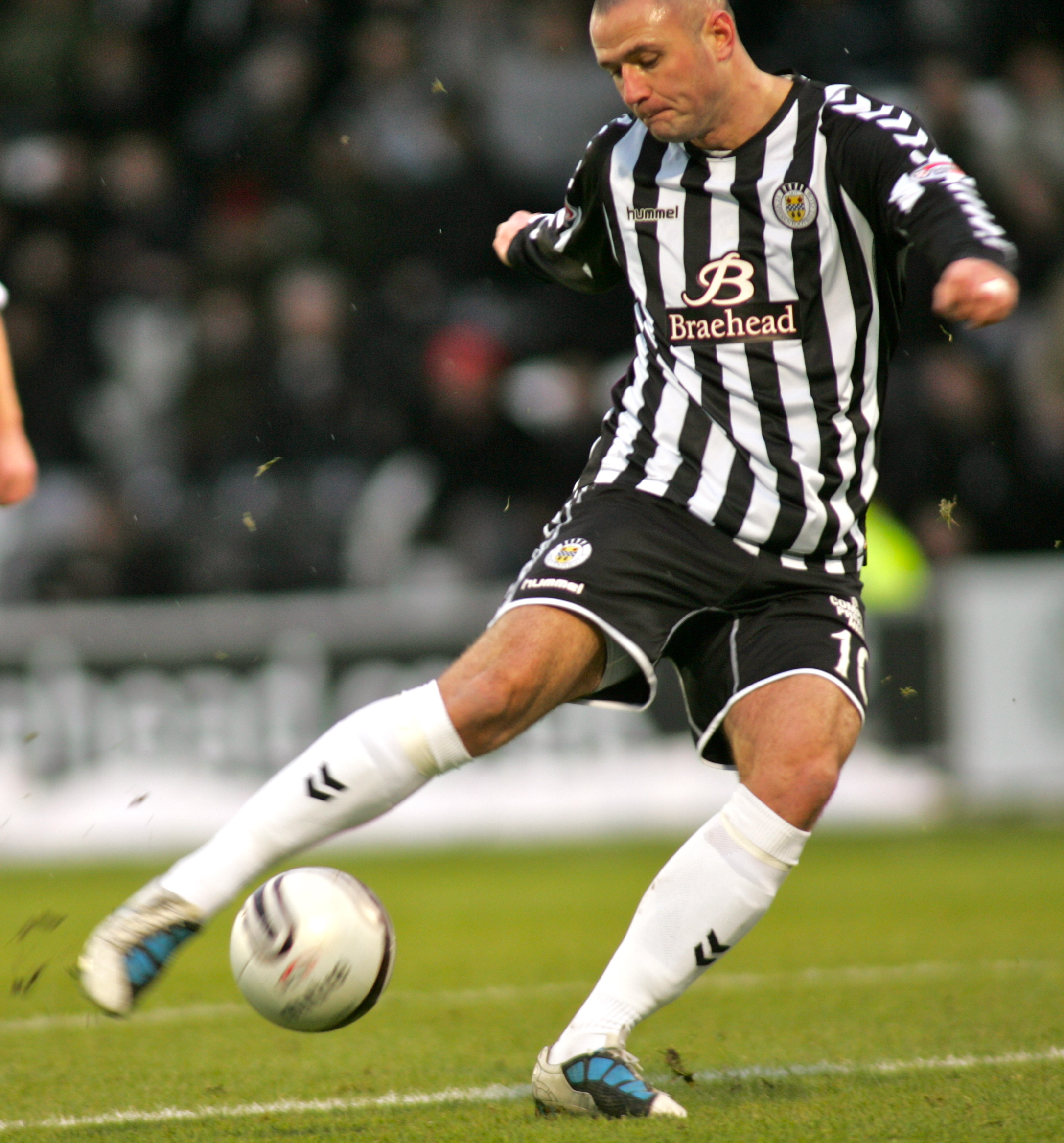
- Higdon with St Mirren

Personal information
- Date of birth: 2 September 1983 (age 43)
- Place of birth: Liverpool, England
- Position: Forward

Senior career*
Years	Team	Apps	(Gls)
2003–2007	Crewe Alexandra	81	(10)
2007–2009	Falkirk	62	(15)
2009–2011	St Mirren	61	(18)
2011–2013	Motherwell	72	(40)
2013–2014	NEC Nijmegen	32	(14)
2014–2016	Sheffield United	15	(2)
2015	→ Oldham Athletic (loan)	11	(5)
2016	Tranmere Rovers	9	(2)
2016–2017	Bangor City	3	(0)
Total		346	(106)
- * Club domestic league appearances and goals

Michael Higdon (born 2 September 1983) is an English former professional footballer who played as a forward.

He began his career with Crewe Alexandra where he came through the youth team before making the break into their first eleven in 2003. In 2007, he joined Scottish side Falkirk and then St Mirren in 2009 and Motherwell in 2011. After being a regular goal scorer in the Scottish Leagues, Higdon then moved to Dutch side NEC Nijmegen where he spent one season before signing for Sheffield United.

== Career ==
=== Crewe Alexandra ===
Higdon was born in Liverpool. progressed from the Crewe Alexandra youth team into their first team in 2003. He was originally used as a midfielder, but due to his height and physical presence, he was converted into a striker by manager Dario Gradi. Higdon's most famous moment for Crewe came against Coventry City in the last game of the 2004–05 season, where Crewe had to win to have a chance of staying up. They went 1–0 down but Higdon scored the equaliser to set up Steve Jones to score the winner which kept Crewe Alexandra in the Championship.

=== Falkirk ===
Higdon joined Scottish Premier League club Falkirk in June 2007 on a free transfer. He had been offered a contract by Crewe, but chose to turn the offer down as he felt he was unlikely to get into the team ahead of Luke Varney and Nicky Maynard. He scored twice on his Falkirk debut against Gretna.

In the final SPL game of 2008–09 for Falkirk, Higdon scored the winning goal to save Falkirk from relegation and thus relegating Inverness Caledonian Thistle.

=== St Mirren ===
Higdon joined St Mirren on 24 June 2009 and scored his first goal for St Mirren against Ayr United in the Co-Operative Insurance Cup . On 12 December 2009, he scored a spectacular long-range strike against his former club, Falkirk, much to the delight of the home fans.

Higdon found his scoring boots in the 2010–11 season, scoring his first hat-trick in a 3–1 win over Hamilton Academical on 2 April 2011. In the 2010–11 season, Higdon notched a total of 15 goals in 33 appearances for St Mirren.

=== Motherwell ===
On 3 June 2011, Higdon left St Mirren to sign for fellow SPL side Motherwell. He made his debut appearance for Motherwell on 23 July, against Inverness Caledonian Thistle at Fir Park. Higdon scored his first goal for Motherwell in a 4–0 League Cup win over Clyde at Broadwood, and his first league goals in a 4–2 win over Dunfermline Athletic. On 22 February 2012, Higdon scored his first Motherwell hat-trick in a 4–3 win over Hibernian at Fir Park, which included a stunning overhead kick.

Higdon got his first goal of the 2012–13 season at Fir Park in an SPL game where he opened the scoring in a 1–1 draw against former club St Mirren with a well placed goal into the corner with his weak foot. Higdon scored frequently during the 2012–13 season, becoming the top Motherwell goalscorer in a season since the Second World War. He ended the season with 26 league goals, including a club record two hat-tricks, to finish as the league's top scorer. He was voted PFA Scotland Players' Player of the Year for the 2012–13 season.

On 27 June 2013, Higdon indicated through his agent that he would not return to Motherwell for pre-season training.

=== NEC Nijmegen ===
On 8 July 2013, Higdon signed a two-year contract with NEC Nijmegen. NEC technical director, Carlos Aalbers, cited his target-man qualities and his ability "to score goals at the highest level" as reasons for the signing. Higdon made his competitive debut for NEC on the opening day of the league season, in a 4–1 home loss to Groningen. Higdon scored his first goal for NEC, which came from the penalty spot in a 2–2 home draw against RKC Waalwijk. Higdon netted a second equaliser for NEC in a 3–2 home defeat to Vitesse on 29 September. Higdon scored in a 4–3 defeat at Go Ahead Eagles on 5 October. Higdon hit a double in 2–1 home win over SC Heerenveen on 25 October, and then fired in an early winner in 1–0 defeat of FC Eindhoven in the KNVB Cup on 29 October. Higdon would then go on a run of scoring eight goals in 11 league games, beginning with goals in 1–1 draws with Vitesse (away) on 26 January and Go Ahead Eagles (at home) on 2 February. and then scoring the third in 3–1 victory at RKC Waalwijk on 15 February. During his run of eight goals in 11 league games, he next hit four in four league games; 3–3 draw at PEC Zwolle (1 March), 3–1 defeat at Roda JC (8 March), and home ties with FC Utrecht (16 March) and Heerenveen (22 March) that both finished 2–2. And his final goal during this run came in 2–1 home defeat to Heracles Almelo (29 March), despite Higdon opening the scoring.

=== Sheffield United ===
On 4 August 2014, Higdon returned to play in England, joining Sheffield United for an undisclosed fee on a two-year deal with the option of a third year. On 9 August 2014, Higdon scored on his début against Bristol City. Higdon netted his second goal for the Blades in a 1–0 win at Leyton Orient to send them through to the fourth round of the League Cup. On 28 October 2014, Higdon netted a late brace in a 2–1 away victory over Milton Keynes Dons, which sent United to the last eight of the League Cup in the fifth round. In early November, Higdon was ruled out for a month after he pulled his hamstring during training. On 1 February 2016, the club cancelled the striker's contract after Higdon left by mutual consent.

=== Oldham Athletic (loan) ===
On 23 September 2015, Higdon joined Oldham Athletic on a three-month loan deal. He played 13 games, scoring five goals, before returning to Sheffield United upon the completion of his loan.

== Honours ==
Crewe Alexandra Youth Academy

- Milk Cup: Junior Section Winner 1998

St Mirren

- Renfrewshire Cup: 2010

Individual

- Scottish Premier League Golden Boot: 2012–13
- PFA Scotland Players' Player of the Year: 2012–13
