= Stephen O'Donnell (footballer, born 1983) =

Scottish footballer

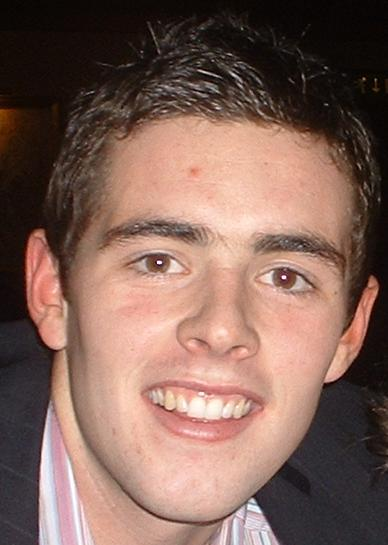

Personal information
- Full name: Stephen James O'Donnell
- Date of birth: 10 July 1983 (age 43)
- Place of birth: Bellshill, Scotland
- Position: Midfielder

Youth career
- 1999–2002: Dundee United

Senior career*
Years	Team	Apps	(Gls)
2001–2005	Dundee United	17	(0)
2003–2004	→ Ross County (loan)	24	(3)
2005	Boston United	4	(0)
2005–2007	Clyde	54	(14)
2007–2010	St Mirren	45	(5)
2010–2014	Dundee	73	(6)
2014–2015	Clyde	26	(1)

International career
1999–2000	Scotland U16	4	(0)
2001	Scotland U19	1	(0)
2002–2003	Scotland U20	2	(2)
- * Club domestic league appearances and goals

Stephen James O'Donnell (born 10 July 1983) is a Scottish footballer who plays as a midfielder. He began his career with Dundee United, making his debut in 2002. He spent time on loan with Ross County before leaving Dundee United in 2005 to play briefly in England with Boston United. Returning to Scottish football, O'Donnell had spells with Clyde and St Mirren before joining Dundee in 2010, where he later became club captain. He rejoined Clyde in 2014 and left the club in 2015. He was a Scotland under-20 international.

== Club career ==
=== Dundee United ===
Born in Bellshill, O'Donnell began his career with Dundee United, making his first-team début in March 2002 and featuring six times in the final months of 2001–02, signing an extended contract in the process. The following season, O'Donnell featured in fourteen matches, scoring a hat-trick in the League Cup and netting in the Scottish Cup defeat to Hibernian. Before the start of the 2003–04 season, manager Ian McCall allowed O'Donnell to join Ross County on loan, where he was reunited with Alex Smith, who gave him his senior début at United. Initially signing on loan for six months, the deal was extended for the duration of the season, with O'Donnell playing most matches. Failing to break back into the United first team in 2004–05, O'Donnell went on trial at English side Boston United, joining in February for the rest of the season.

=== Clyde ===
After failing to win a long-term contract with Boston United, O'Donnell returned to Scotland to sign for Clyde. O'Donnell scored ten goals for the club during the 2005–06 season and was rewarded partway through with a new 18-month contract. O'Donnell scored a penalty at Ibrox against Rangers in the Scottish League Cup, to put Clyde 2–1 up, though they lost 5–2 after extra time. O'Donnell also got the opportunity to score against the other half of the Old Firm, Celtic, a few months later in the Scottish Cup, though this time his penalty was saved by Artur Boruc. He also took the resulting corner kick, which led to the winning Clyde goal as they pulled off a famous cup upset.

=== St Mirren ===
O'Donnell signed for St Mirren on 30 January 2007 and scored his first goal within three weeks, netting in the 1–1 draw against Hearts at Tynecastle. In December 2007, O'Donnell suffered a broken metatarsal in training, ruling him out for three months. He made his return from injury in mid-April by appearing on the bench, unused, and had played a few games towards the end of the season. At the end of the season, O'Donnell signed a one-year contract extension.

The following season, O'Donnell had made 8 appearances this 2008–09 season for St Mirren despite injury problems on his knee. By in late November, O'Donnell was soon prepared to return from injury and return to fitness following a course of injections. However, O'Donnell was injured again on the knee and needed a specialist in order to recover from his knee injuries O'Donnell shortly spoke about his injury, saying that it was the worst spell of his career due to back to back injuries. In May, O'Donnell made a recovery, and having not played for almost eight months, played in a reserves match against Aberdeen. On his return, He scored a goal in the 3–1 defeat against Motherwell on 10 May 2009.

The following season, O'Donnell recovered from injury, leading him to his return to the starting eleven. In the first round of Scottish League Cup, O'Donnell scored his first goal of the season in a 6–3 win over East Stirlingshire; he then scored his first league goal in a 2–1 loss against Rangers and two weeks later on 5 December 2009, he scored another in a 3–2 loss against Dundee United. On 1 May 2010, he scored an 86th-minute header against Falkirk which almost certainly secured SPL survival for the Saints. But on 10 June 2010, St Mirren announced that O'Donnell was to leave the club as he was not part of new manager Danny Lennon's plans.

=== Dundee ===
On 16 July 2010, he signed a one-year deal with Dundee after being on trial. On the opening game of the season, he made his debut, coming on for Leigh Griffiths in a 77th minutes, in a 1–0 win over Queen of the South; several weeks later, he scored his first goal in a 2–0 win over Falkirk. Six month later since joining Dundee, O'Donnell spoke out about the club's recent administration which led to 25 points deducted as punishment and that, he won't forget the time when his teammates face the sack. Later in the season, O'Donnell would score two more goals against Stirling Albion and Raith Rovers. He since became a regular in the first team at Dundee.

The following season, O'Donnell started his season by scoring a winning goal in extra time, and also set up a goal for Steven Milne in a 2–1 win over Arbroath in the first round of Scottish Challenge Cup. On 10 September 2011, O'Donnell received a red card after a second bookable offence in a 1–0 win over Raith Rovers; three-month later on 17 December 2011, he received a red card after a serious tackle on Iain Vigurs in a 1–1 draw against Ross County. After the match, the club would appeal O'Donnell's sending off The appeal was rejected – making O'Donnell miss three matches as punishment. O'Donnell made his return in a 3–0 win over Livingston on 14 January 2012 and set up the third goal in a match for Nicky Riley. On 7 April 2012, O'Donnell scored his first league goal in a 3–1 win over Falkirk and scored again in a 1–1 draw against Queen of the South the following week At the end of the season, O'Donnell signed a new deal with Dundee.

The following season, Dundee were promoted to Scottish Premier League after Rangers were demoted, and O'Donnell was appointed as a new captain at Dundee, describing being a captain as an honour. O'Donnell played against his former club Dundee United on 19 August 2012. However, during the match, O'Donnell received a straight red card, along with Johnny Russell after O'Donnell made a tackle on Russell, which led to brawl. After the match, both clubs appealed for their sending off, and the SFA said both O'Donnell and Russell's sendings off had been reduced to cautions for unsporting behaviour, leading both clubs to win the appeals, leading them to play the next game. Soon after his successful appeal, O'Donnell suffered an injury. In late December 2012, O'Donnell declared himself fit from injury. After three appearances, O'Donnell tore his cruciate ligament during a defeat by St Johnstone, causing him to miss the rest of the season. While being on the sidelines, he revealed he was suffering arthritis from a mild form of the condition in September, when he suffered a first injury of the season. While being on the sidelines, his captaincy was taken over by Gary Irvine

While on the sidelines, O'Donnell see his club being relegated back to the Scottish Championship and after a year on the sidelines despite making an appearance against Dumbarton on 29 December 2013, it announced that O'Donnell was released by the club after a four years spell.

=== Clyde (second spell) ===
On 29 August 2014, O'Donnell agreed a one-year contract at Clyde, joining the club for a second time. It was announced in May 2015 that he was to be released by the club.

== International career ==
O'Donnell has played for his country at under-16, under-19 and under-20 level. In January 2004, O'Donnell was named in the Scotland under-21 squad to play against Hungary under-21s. but failed to add to his appearances at earlier levels.

== Personal life ==
O'Donnell is the nephew of former Motherwell captain Phil O'Donnell, who died on the pitch on 29 December 2007. He is also a cousin of former Motherwell striker David Clarkson.

== Career statistics ==
After 9 May 2009

Club performance			League		Cup		League Cup		Total	
Season	Club	League	Apps	Goals	Apps	Goals	Apps	Goals	Apps	Goals
Scotland			League		Scottish Cup		League Cup		Total	
2001–02	Dundee United	Scottish Premier League	6	0	-		-		6	0
2002–03	Dundee United	Scottish Premier League	11	0	1	1	2	3	14	4
2003–04	Ross County (loan)	Scottish First Division	24	3	1	0	1	0	26	3
England			League		FA Cup		League Cup		Total	
2004–05	Boston United	Football League Two	4	0	-		-		4	0
Scotland			League		Scottish Cup		League Cup		Total	
2005–06	Clyde	Scottish First Division	33	11	3	0	3	1	39	12
2006–07	Clyde	Scottish First Division	21	2	1	0	1	1	23	3
2006–07	St Mirren	Scottish Premier League	5	1	-		-		5	1
2007–08	St Mirren	Scottish Premier League	10	0	-		1	0	11	0
2008–09	St Mirren	Scottish Premier League	5	1	-		-		5	1
Career total			129	18	6	1	8	5	143	24

== See also ==
- 2001–02 Dundee United F.C. season
- 2002–03 Dundee United F.C. season
- 2005–06 Clyde F.C. season
- 2006–07 Clyde F.C. season
- 2007–08 St Mirren F.C. season
- 2008–09 St Mirren F.C. season
