= Garry Brady =

Scottish footballer

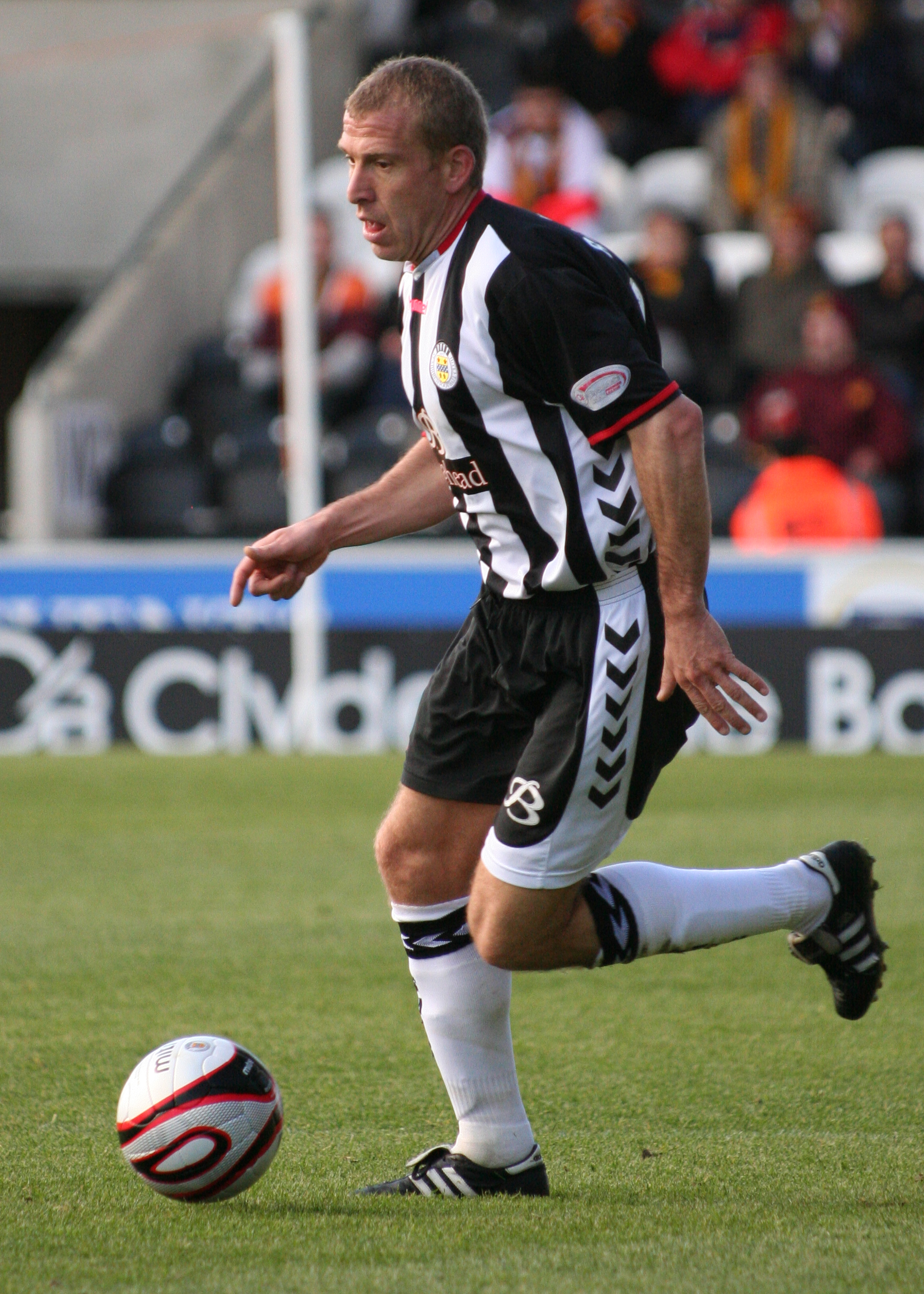

Personal information
- Full name: Garry Brady
- Date of birth: 7 September 1976 (age 50)
- Place of birth: Glasgow, Scotland
- Position: Midfielder

Youth career
- 1990–1993: Celtic Boys Club
- 1993–1997: Tottenham Hotspur

Senior career*
Years	Team	Apps	(Gls)
1997–1998	Tottenham Hotspur	9	(0)
1998–2001	Newcastle United	9	(0)
2000	→ Norwich City (loan)	6	(0)
2000	→ Norwich City (loan)	2	(0)
2001–2002	Portsmouth	14	(0)
2002–2006	Dundee	119	(2)
2006–2011	St Mirren	108	(4)
2011–2013	Brechin City	53	(1)
Total		321	(7)

International career
- Scotland U18
- * Club domestic league appearances and goals

Garry Brady (born 7 September 1976) is a Scottish former footballer.

== Career ==
Brady began his career with Tottenham Hotspur in 1993 as a teenager, making around a dozen senior appearances before joining Newcastle United in 1998; the £650,000 transfer fee was decided by a tribunal, with Brady having allowed his Tottenham contract to expire in the hope of more first-team appearances elsewhere. Lauded as "one of the brightest prospects in British football" at the time, Brady made a similar number of appearances at St James' Park, but his time on Tyneside was blighted by a serious ankle injury limiting his opportunities.

The Scottish under-18 international winger moved with Des Hamilton to Norwich on loan in March 2000, to the end of the 1999–2000 season. On 4 September 2000, Brady returned to Carrow Road on a two-month loan, with a special entitlement allowing him to play in League Cup matches. His loan period expired on 26 October 2000 with Norwich declining to make the move permanent. Brady was released by Newcastle in January 2001 and subsequently joined Portsmouth on trial on 12 February 2001 before signing a permanent deal.

Falling out of favour, Brady joined Scottish side Kilmarnock on trial at the end of January 2002 but returned to Portsmouth to make four league appearances that season. In July 2002, he joined Walsall on trial and returned to Scotland the following month on trial with Dundee. This move became permanent during the first week of September 2002. He came off the bench in the 2003 Scottish Cup Final which Dundee lost 1–0 to Rangers and also played in the following season's UEFA Cup. In mid-June 2006, after four years at Dens Park, Brady agreed terms with Scottish Premier League newcomers St Mirren, having turned down a request from Dundee – like several other players – to accept a wage cut. He appeared for St Mirren in the 2010 Scottish League Cup Final, another defeat to Rangers, although he was named Man of the Match.

In June 2011 he joined Brechin City. He scored his first and only league goal for Brechin in a 3–1 defeat to Cowdenbeath. At the end of the 2012–13 season, Brechin announced that Brady was amongst the players being released.

== Personal life ==
His younger brother Darren was also a footballer whose clubs included Raith Rovers.

He has assisted Andy McLaren (a fellow former footballer and childhood resident of Glasgow's Castlemilk district) in operating McLaren's A&M charity offering football coaching and guidance to children in deprived areas.

== Career statistics ==
Club	Season	League		Cup		League Cup		Other		Total	
Club	Season	Apps	Goals	Apps	Goals	Apps	Goals	Apps	Goals	Apps	Goals
Tottenham Hotspur	1997–98	9	0	2	0	–	–	–	–	11	0
Tottenham Hotspur	Total	9	0	2	0	–	–	–	–	11	0
Newcastle United	1998–99	9	0	3	0	–	–	–	–	12	0
Newcastle United	Total	9	0	3	0	–	–	–	–	12	0
Norwich City (loan)	1999–00	6	0	–	–	–	–	–	–	6	0
Norwich City (loan)	2000–01	2	0	–	–	2	0	–	–	4	0
Norwich City (loan)	Total	8	0	–	–	2	0	–	–	10	0
Portsmouth	2000–01	8	0	–	–	–	–	–	–	8	0
Portsmouth	2001–02	6	0	–	–	–	–	–	–	6	0
Portsmouth	Total	14	0	–	–	–	–	–	–	14	0
Dundee	2002–03	27	1	4	0	2	0	–	–	33	1
Dundee	2003–04	37	0	2	0	3	0	2	0	44	0
Dundee	2004–05	26	1	–	–	2	0	–	–	28	1
Dundee	2005–06	29	0	6	0	1	0	3	0	39	0
Dundee	Total	119	2	12	0	8	0	5	0	144	2
St Mirren	2006–07	29	2	1	0	1	0	–	–	31	2
St Mirren	2007–08	18	0	0	0	0	0	–	–	18	0
St Mirren	2008–09	34	2	4	0	2	0	–	–	40	2
St Mirren	2009–10	22	0	0	0	4	0	–	–	26	0
St Mirren	2010–11	5	0	0	0	0	0	–	–	5	0
St Mirren	Total	108	4	5	0	7	0	–	–	120	4
Brechin City	2011–12	28	1	2	0	1	0	1	0	32	0
Brechin City	2012–13	25	0	1	0	1	0	2	0	29	0
Brechin City	Total	53	0	3	0	2	0	3	0	61	0
Career total		315	6	25	0	19	0	8	0	367	6
