= Mark Corcoran =

Scottish footballer

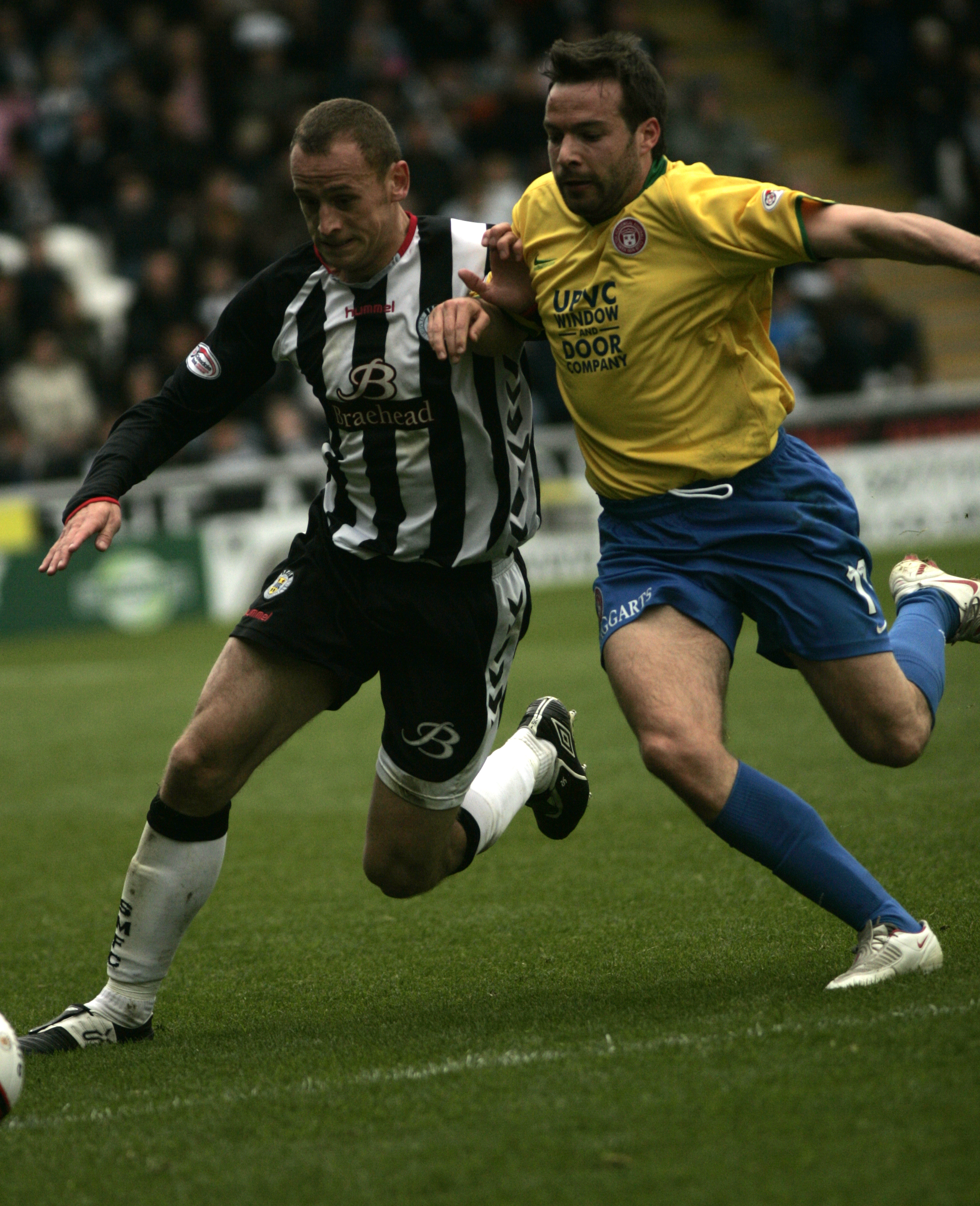
- Corcoran (right) playing for Hamilton Academical

Personal information
- Full name: Mark Christian Corcoran
- Date of birth: 30 November 1980 (age 45)
- Place of birth: Perth, Scotland
- Position: Midfielder

Senior career*
Years	Team	Apps	(Gls)
- Tayport
- Linlithgow Rose
2003–2005	Hamilton Academical	72	(6)
2005–2008	St Mirren	79	(7)
2008–2009	Hamilton Academical	13	(0)
2009–2010	Partick Thistle	31	(4)
2010–2013	Ross County	57	(1)
2013	→ Stenhousemuir (loan)	14	(2)
2013–2014	Stranraer	12	(1)
- * Club domestic league appearances and goals

Mark Corcoran (born 30 November 1980) is a Scottish former professional footballer, who played for Hamilton Academical, St Mirren, Partick Thistle, Ross County, Stenhousemuir and Stranraer. He played in midfield, left wing and in attack.

== Career ==
Corcoran began his career at junior side Tayport before moving to Linlithgow Rose.

Corcoran, who previously played for Hamilton Academical joined St Mirren in 2005 on a free transfer. He made 39 league appearances for the Buddies, before signing a pre-contract with former club Accies on 28 April 2008.

On 28 July 2009 Corcoran signed for Partick Thistle but his contract was cancelled by mutual consent at the end of the season. Corcoran joined Ross County a few days later.

On 25 January 2013 Corcoran joined Stenhousemuir on loan until the end of the season. For the 2013/14 season he signed to play for Stranraer.

He now plays for amateur side Edinburgh strollers who play on Saturday afternoons (leafa) last season he was top goal scorer confirmed by the teams Twitter page.

== Honours ==
St Mirren

- Scottish Challenge Cup: 2005–06
