= Franco Miranda =

Argentine footballer (born 1985)

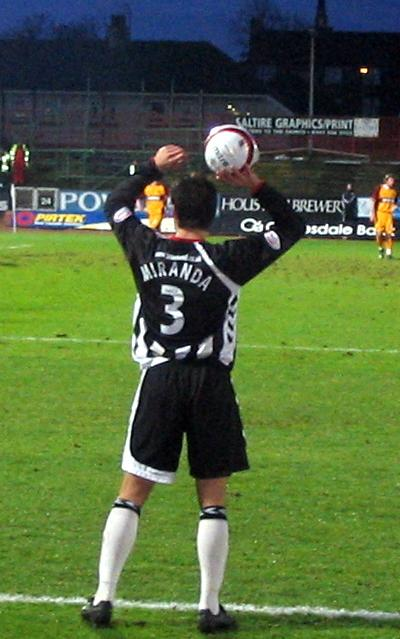

Personal information
- Full name: Franco Andrés Miranda
- Date of birth: 13 May 1985 (age 41)
- Place of birth: Comodoro Rivadavia, Argentina
- Height: 1.82 m (6 ft 0 in)
- Position: Left back

Youth career
- 1991–2001: C.A.I.

Senior career*
Years	Team	Apps	(Gls)
2001–2003	C.A.I.		(?)
2003–2005	River Plate	9	(0)
2005–2006	Racing Club	2	(0)
2006–2007	Helsingborgs IF	19	(0)
2007–2009	C.A.I.	0	(0)
2007–2009	→ St Mirren (loan)	46	(4)
2009–2010	Chacarita Juniors	0	(0)
2010	C.A.I.	9	(0)
2010–2011	Tiro Federal	0	(0)
2011–2013	Patronato	31	(3)
2013–2015	Sportivo Belgrano	55	(2)
2015	Instituto ACC	14	(1)
2016	Juventud Unida	4	(0)
2017–XXXX	CA Pellegrini		
- * Club domestic league appearances and goals as of 22:40, 3 September 2019 (UTC)

Franco Andrés Miranda (born 13 May 1985) is an Argentine footballer who played as a left full back.

== Career ==
Miranda signed for St Mirren in August 2007, on loan from Argentine club CAI. He had returned to Argentina from Sweden, where he was with Helsingborg. Miranda has also played for River Plate during his career.

In the 2007/08 close season, he had been training with Scottish Premier League team St Mirren and a one-year loan deal was eventually agreed with them. On 10 August 2007 St Mirren received international clearance to finalise the deal to bring Miranda to the club. Miranda scored on his debut, opening goal of a 2–1 win against Inverness. On 2 September 2007, Miranda scored the only goal for St Mirren in a match against Celtic but scored an own goal as the club was defeated 5–1 heavily. The next game could not have been worse for Miranda when he was sent off for second bookable offense in a 2–0 loss against Dundee United. But after a fine season with the Buddies, his loan spell was extended by a further season in June 2008. Miranda would score twice against Hamilton and Rangers respectively. Miranda's last St Mirren game was a 3–2 defeat against Dundee United at Tannadice in January 2009. Shortly after this game Miranda suffered a knee injury which ended his season and he then left the Buddies in July 2009 to return to Argentina, where he signed for newly promoted Chacarita Juniors. During his time at St.Mirren, Miranda remains a popular figure at the club and became a regular player, playing in the left back position.

At Chacarita Juniors, Miranda made just 6 appearances and at the end of the 2009/10 season he moved on to Argentine Second Division club Independiente Rivadavia, however it appears that he suffered a setback in passing a medical.

Franco agreed to return to St Mirren on 28 August 2012, and flew to Scotland to conclude the deal However, on 10 September 2012, it was confirmed that St Mirren had pulled out of the deal and that they would instead sign Graeme MacGregor and not signing Franco Miranda.
