= List of Ross County F.C. records and statistics =

Scottish professional association football club

Ross County Football Club is a Scottish professional association football club based in Dingwall. Ross County joined the Highland Football League in 1929, and then were one of two clubs voted into the Scottish Professional Football League System in 1994.

The club's record appearance maker is Michael Gardyne, who has made over 400 appearances through four spells at the club. Michael Gardyne is also County's all time goal scorer, scoring 73 goals.

This list encompasses the major honours won by Ross County, records set by the club, their managers and their players. The player records section includes details of the club's leading goalscorers and those who have made most appearances in first-team competitions. It also records notable achievements by Ross County players on the international stage, and the highest transfer fees paid and received by the club. Attendance records are also included in the list.

== Honours ==
=== League ===
- First Division/Championship (second tier)
  - Winners (2): 2011–12, 2018–19
- Second Division (third tier)
  - Winners (1): 2007–08
- Third Division (fourth tier)
  - Winners (1): 1998–99
- Highland Football League
  - Winners (3): 1966–67, 1990–91, 1991–92
  - Runners-up (2): 1967–68, 1972–73
- North Caledonian Football League
  - Winners (2): 1965–66, 1996–97

=== Cup ===
- Scottish Cup
  - Runners-up (1): 2009–10
- Scottish League Cup:
  - Winners (1): 2015–16
- Challenge Cup
  - Winners (3): 2006–07, 2010–11, 2018–19
  - Runners-up (2): 2004–05, 2008–09
- Qualifying Cup (North)
  - Winners (1): 1993–94
  - Runners-up (5): 1933–34, 1965–66, 1969–70, 1972–73, 1973–74
- North of Scotland Cup
  - Winners (6): 1929–30, 1969–70, 1971–72, 1991–92, 2006–07, 2018–19
- Highland League Cup
  - Winners (4): 1949–50, 1968–69, 1978–79, 1991–92

=== Youth ===
- SPFL Development League (Under-20)
  - Winners (1): 2016–17

== Player records ==
=== Individual records ===
- Most Appearance Holder: Michael Gardyne (444)
- Record Goalscorer: Michael Gardyne (73)
- Most Goals in a season (all competitions): Andrew Barrowman (29)
- Most Goals in a season (league): Andrew Barrowman (24)
- Most Clean Sheets: Nicky Walker (54)
- Most Hat-Tricks: Liam Boyce (5)

=== Most appearances ===
As of 18 October 2026

#	Name	Career	Apps	Goals
1	(Scotland) Michael Gardyne	2006–2007, 2008–2012, 2014–2015, 2015–2021	444	73
2	(Scotland) Scott Boyd	2007–2008, 2008–2017	306	12
3	(Scotland) Mark McCulloch	2002–2009	288	8
4	(Scotland) Richard Brittain	2008–2015	269	50
5	(Scotland) Don Cowie	2000–2007, 2018–2020	249	29
6	(Scotland) Iain Vigurs	2009–2013, 2018–2021	238	29
7	(Scotland) Jordan White	2021–2026	234	46
8	(Scotland) Sean Higgins	2002–2009	220	59
9	(Scotland) Steven Ferguson	1996–2003	220	54
10	(England) Connor Randall	2020–	210	8
11	(Scotland) Marcus Fraser	2015–2020	197	4
12	(Scotland) Paul Lawson	2007–2013	190	17
13	(Scotland) Martin Scott	2006–2011, 2012–2013	189	9
14	(Scotland) Ross Laidlaw	2019–2026	186	0
15	(Scotland) Kenny Gilbert	1996–2003	183	4
16	(Scotland) David MacKay	1994–2001	177	2
17	(Scotland) Ian Maxwell	1998–2002	171	5
18	(Scotland) Hugh Robertson	2000–2004, 2006-2008	160	16
19	(Scotland) Billy Herd	1994–1999	154	5
20	(Scotland) Stuart Kettlewell	2009–2014	154	10
21	(Scotland) Brian Irvine	1999–2003	150	18
22	(Scotland) Gary Miller	2007–2012	150	3
23	(Scotland) David Winters	1996–2003	148	42
24	(Scotland) Stuart Golabek	1995–1999, 2007–2009	147	10
25	(Scotland) Scott Fox	2014–2019	147	0

=== Top goalscorers ===
As of 18 October 2026

#	Name	Career	Apps	Goals	Ratio
1	(Scotland) Michael Gardyne	2006–2007, 2008–2012, 2014–2015, 2015–2021	444	73	0.16
2	(Scotland) Sean Higgins	2002–2009	220	59	0.27
3	(Scotland) Derek Adams	1996–1998, 2006–2009	134	56	0.42
4	(Northern Ireland) Liam Boyce	2014–2017	115	55	0.48
5	(Scotland) Steven Ferguson	1996–2003	220	54	0.25
6	(Scotland) Brian Graham	2015–2016, 2018–2020, 2026–	117	52	0.44
7	(Scotland) Richard Brittain	2008–2015	269	50	0.19
8	(Scotland) Jordan White	2021–2026	234	46	0.20
9	(Scotland) Andrew Barrowman	2007–2008, 2010–2011	94	45	0.48
10	(Scotland) Alex Bone	2000, 2000–2003	105	44	0.42
11	(Scotland) David Winters	2003, 2003–2006, 2008–2008	148	42	0.28
12	(Northern Ireland) Billy McKay	2017–2021	126	41	0.33
13	(Scotland) Steven Craig	2008–2012	123	33	0.27
14	(Northern Ireland) Ronan Hale	2024–2026	67	30	0.45
15	(Netherlands) Alex Schalk	2015–2018	108	30	0.28
16	(Scotland) Don Cowie	2000–2007, 2018–2020	249	30	0.12
17	(England) Craig Curran	2014–2018	118	29	0.25
18	(Scotland) Iain Vigurs	2009–2013, 2018–2021	238	29	0.12
19	(Scotland) Gary Wood	1996–2000	80	28	0.35
20	(Scotland) Ross Stewart	2018–2021	82	28	0.34
21	(Scotland) Neil Tarrant	1997–1999, 2001-2002	60	27	0.45
22	(Scotland) Simon Murray	2023–2024	62	26	0.42
23	(Scotland) Brian Grant	1994–1996	84	26	0.31
24	(Scotland) Colin McMenamin	2011–2013	60	21	0.35
=	(Australia) Jamie MacPherson	1994–1999	65	21	0.32
=	(England) Kieran Phillips	2025–	72	21	0.29
=	(Scotland) John Rankin	2003–2006	124	21	0.17

=== Clean Sheets ===
As of 1 May 2026

#	Name	Career	Apps	Clean Sheets	Ratio
1	(Scotland) Nicky Walker	1997–2001	137	54	0.39
2	(Scotland) Ross Laidlaw	2019–2026	186	45	0.24
3	(England) Tony Bullock	2001–2003, 2007–2009	145	41	0.28
4	(Scotland) Scott Fox	2014–2019	147	38	0.26
5	(Northern Ireland) Michael McGovern	2009–2011	96	32	0.33
6	(Scotland) Steve Hutchison	1994–1998	98	30	0.31
7	(Scotland) Michael Fraser	2011–2014	77	25	0.32
8	(Scotland) Mark Brown	2012–2015	71	17	0.24
9	(Scotland) Colin Stewart	2003–2005	47	13	0.28
10	(Northern Ireland) Trevor Carson	2025–2026	30	10	0.33

=== Club captains ===
Name	Dates	Notes
(Scotland) Jim Lauchlan	2004–2006	
(Scotland) Don Cowie	2006–2007	
(Scotland) Richard Brittain	2009–2015	
(England) Andrew Davies	2015–2018	
(Scotland) Marcus Fraser	2018–2020	
(Scotland) Iain Vigurs	2020–2021	
(Scotland) Keith Watson	2021–2023	
(England) Jack Baldwin	2023–2024	
(England) Connor Randall	2024–2025	
(Scotland) Declan Gallagher	2025–2026	
(Scotland) Brian Graham	2026–	

=== Team of the decade ===
In January 2020 Ross County Twitter put out a poll to fans to decide on the team of the 2010s. The results were as follows:

- GK: (Scotland) Scott Fox
- DF: (Scotland) Marcus Fraser
- DF: (England) Andrew Davies
- DF: (Scotland) Scott Boyd
- DF: (Greece) Evangelos Ikonomou
- MF: (Scotland) Richard Brittain
- MF: (Australia) Jackson Irvine
- MF: (Scotland) Iain Vigurs
- MF: (Scotland) Michael Gardyne
- FW: (Northern Ireland) Liam Boyce
- FW: (Netherlands) Alex Schalk

=== International players ===
This is a list of former and current players who have played at full international level while with the club and the year of their first International cap while at the club.

- Most Caps while at Club: Liam Boyce, Atli Gregersen, Yoann Arquin, Richard Hastings (6)
- Most International Goals while at Club: Richard Chin (2)

Score for capped country listed first

Player	Country	First Cap	Last Cap
Jackson Irvine	Australia	5–0 vs. Bangladesh, 3 September 2015	1–0 vs. Greece, 4 June 2016
Josh Nisbet	Australia	0–0 vs. Indonesia, 10 September 2024	
André Hainault	Canada	1–2 vs. Japan, 22 March 2013	0–1 vs. Costa Rica, 27 May 2013
Richard Hastings	Canada	1–2 vs. Malta, 14 November 2001	3–1 vs. Switzerland, 15 May 2002
Victor Loturi	Canada	4–2 vs. Cuba, 4 July 2023	
Tim Chow	Chinese Taipei	1–2 vs. Turkmenistan, 14 November 2017	
Mattias Käit	Estonia	0–0 vs. Armenia, 24 March 2018	0–2 vs. (Georgia (country)) Georgia, 27 March 2018
Atli Gregersen	Faroe Islands	1–2 vs. Estonia, 11 August 2010	0–3 vs. Scotland, 16 November 2010
Regan Charles-Cook	Grenada	0–4 vs. Honduras, 14 July 2021	0–0 vs. Gibraltar, 23 March 2022
Nohan Kenneh	Liberia	2–2 vs. South Africa, 24 March 2023	2–1 vs. São Tomé and Príncipe, 24 March 2025
Richard Chin	Malaysia	0–2 vs. China, 14 November 2026	2–1 vs. Yemen, 17 November 2026
Yoann Arquin	Martinique	1–1 vs. Curaçao, 8 October 2014	2–0 vs. Antigua and Barbuda, 16 November 2014
Liam Boyce	Northern Ireland	1–1 vs. Qatar, 31 May 2015	1–0 vs. Azerbaijan, 10 June 2017
Ronan Hale	Northern Ireland	1–0 vs. Iceland, 10 June 2025	
Michael McGovern	Northern Ireland	0–1 vs. Chile, 30 May 2010	
Seán Webb	Northern Ireland	0–1 vs. Uruguay, 21 May 2006	2–1 vs. Sweden, 28 March 2007
Filip Kiss	Slovakia	3–1 vs. Israel, 15 March 2014	2–1 vs. Finland, 18 November 2014
Erik Čikoš	Slovakia	2–0 vs. Montenegro, 23 May 2014	0–1 vs. Russia, 26 May 2014

== Club records ==
- First league goal scored: William D Herd 1994 v Cowdenbeath
- Record all-time attendance: 8,000 approx v Rangers (Scottish Cup 28 February 1966)
- Record league attendance: 6,590 v Celtic (Scottish Premiership 18 November 2017)
- Record win: 14–0 v Heart of Midlothian 'B' (Scottish Challenge Cup, 26 September 2026)
- Record League win: 8–0 v Albion Rovers (Scottish Third Division; 15 August 1998), and Queen of the South (Scottish League One; 15 September 2026)
- Record defeat: 0–7 v Kilmarnock (1961–62 Scottish Cup third round)
- Record League defeat: 0–6 v Celtic (Scottish Premiership; 19 October 2019), Rangers (Scottish Premiership; 24 August 2024), and Raith Rovers (13 December 2025; Scottish Championship)
- Club record signing: £100,000 – Ross Draper from Inverness Caledonian Thistle, 9 August 2017
- Club record sale: £500,000 – Liam Boyce to Burton Albion, 20 June 2017

== Managers ==
Information correct as of 21 November 2026. Only competitive matches are counted.

Table headers

- Nationality – If the manager played international football as a player, the country/countries he played for are shown. Otherwise, the manager's nationality is given as their country of birth.
- From – The year of the manager's first game for Ross County.
- To – The year of the manager's last game for Ross County.
- P – The number of games managed for Ross County.
- W – The number of games won as a manager.
- D – The number of games drawn as a manager.
- L – The number of games lost as a manager.
- GF – The number of goals scored under his management.
- GA – The number of goals conceded under his management.
- Win% – The total winning percentage under his management.
- Honours – The trophies won while managing Ross County.

List of Ross County F.C. managers
Name	Nationality	From	To	P	W	D	L	GF	GA	Win% (Note: Win% is rounded to two decimal places)	Honours
Tom Pirie	Scotland	August 1929	July 1930	32	13	4	15	69	71	40.63	1 North of Scotland Cup
Johnny Hart	Scotland	July 1930	May 1931	32	13	6	13	84	57	40.63	
John Ramage	Scotland	July 1931	May 1932	36	13	9	14	85	95	36.11	
George Henderson	England	December 1937	March 1938	9	1	1	7	16	41	11.11	
George Barrie	Scotland	May 1938	August 1939	33	14	3	16	89	109	42.42	
Jimmy Dykes	Scotland	23 January 1951	June 1951	19	10	1	8	51	44	52.63	
Jim Fiddes	Scotland	August 1951	January 1952	24	6	4	14	51	76	25.00	
Jim Stenhouse	Scotland	July 1952	June 1953	36	18	1	17	82	63	50.00	
Alec Young	Scotland	June 1958	July 1964	237	96	32	109	484	497	40.51	
Sammy Wilson	Scotland	July 1964	September 1966	101	59	15	27	303	197	58.42	
Ian McNeill	Scotland	September 1966	June 1968	68	51	7	10	203	78	75.00	1 Highland Football League
Archie Wright	Scotland	18 June 1968	April 1969	34	19	9	6	90	57	55.88	
Jack Lornie	Scotland	April 1969	June 1971	90	53	15	22	238	172	58.89	1 Highland League Cup; 1 North of Scotland Cup
Ian McNeill	Scotland	June 1971	June 1976	227	114	46	67	522	367	50.22	1 North of Scotland Cup
Jack Lornie	Scotland	June 1976	June 1977	40	14	4	22	69	81	35.00	
Bill Cassidy	Scotland	August 1977	June 1979	79	47	12	20	172	109	59.49	1 Highland League Cup
Sammy Wilson	Scotland	July 1979	May 1982	115	48	25	42	222	225	41.74	
Robbie Giles	Scotland	May 1982	October 1983	54	19	8	27	112	119	35.19	
Donald Stuart (caretaker)	Scotland	October 1983	December 1983	12	3	5	4	22	21	25.00	
Sandy Wallace	Scotland	December 1983	December 1985	71	29	12	30	129	141	40.85	
John Buchanan	Scotland	December 1985	March 1987	49	10	3	36	78	147	20.41	
Chic Ogilvie (interim)	Scotland	March 1987	May 1987	4	0	2	2	3	7	0.00	
Bobby Wilson	Scotland	June 1987	1 July 1996	400	214	63	123	874	580	53.50	2 Highland Football League; 1 North of Scotland Cup; 1 Highland League Cup
Neale Cooper	Scotland	1 July 1996	11 November 2002	275	131	62	82	455	330	47.64	1 Scottish Football League Third Division
Danny McDonald (caretaker)	Scotland	11 November 2002	27 November 2002	2	0	1	1	0	2	0.00	
Alex Smith	Scotland	27 November 2002	11 June 2005	110	39	26	45	148	124	35.45	
John Robertson	Scotland	21 June 2005	24 October 2005	15	6	5	4	18	14	40.00	
Gardner Speirs (caretaker)	Scotland	24 October 2005	3 June 2006	28	11	10	7	42	33	39.29	
Scott Leitch	Scotland	1 July 2006	17 June 2007	46	14	12	20	57	68	30.43	1 Scottish Challenge Cup
Dick Campbell	Scotland	17 June 2007	2 October 2007	12	6	3	3	19	11	50.00	
Derek Adams	Scotland	2 October 2007	11 November 2010	140	66	31	43	189	175	47.14	1 Scottish Football League Second Division
Willie McStay	Scotland	25 November 2010	12 February 2011	9	0	6	3	5	9	0.00	
Jimmy Calderwood	Scotland	17 February 2011	15 May 2011	17	7	6	4	18	10	41.18	
Derek Adams	Scotland	19 May 2011	28 August 2014	113	41	32	40	244	181	36.28	1 Scottish Football League First Division
Jim McIntyre	Scotland	9 September 2014	25 September 2017	138	50	32	56	204	210	36.23	1 Scottish League Cup
Owen Coyle	Ireland	28 September 2017	1 March 2018	22	4	5	13	28	43	18.18	
Steven Ferguson Stuart Kettlewell	Scotland Scotland	2 March 2018	10 June 2020	96	43	23	30	137	118	44.79	1 Scottish Championship; 1 Scottish Challenge Cup
Stuart Kettlewell	Scotland	10 June 2020	19 December 2020	24	7	5	12	24	41	29.17	
John Hughes	Scotland	21 December 2020	24 May 2021	21	8	2	11	26	35	38.10	
Malky Mackay	Scotland	26 May 2021	15 November 2023	107	31	25	51	134	181	28.97	
Derek Adams	Scotland	20 November 2023	7 February 2024	12	2	3	7	8	20	16.67	
Don Cowie	Scotland	8 February 2024	24 August 2025	71	21	17	33	93	120	29.58	
John Robertson (interim)	Scotland	26 August 2025	3 September 2025	1	0	1	0	2	2	0.00	
Tony Docherty	Scotland	3 September 2025	14 December 2025	15	4	4	7	19	26	26.67	
John Robertson (interim)	Scotland	17 December 2025	30 December 2025	2	0	1	1	0	2	0.00	
Stuart Kettlewell	Scotland	30 December 2025	Present	47	30	6	11	119	47	63.83	
