= 2010–11 Ross County F.C. season =

Ross County
2010–11 season
- Chairman: Roy MacGregor
- Manager: Derek Adams (until 11 November); Willie McStay (from 25 November to 13 February); Jimmy Calderwood (from 17 February)
- Stadium: Victoria Park
- Scottish First Division: Eight place
- Challenge Cup: Winners
- League Cup: Third round
- Scottish Cup: Fourth Round
- Top goalscorer: League: Andrew Barrowman (5); All: Andrew Barrowman (5)
- Highest home attendance: 3,205 vs. Dundee, 23 April 2011
- Lowest home attendance: 1,759 vs. Greenock Morton, 14 December 2010
- Average home league attendance: 2,358
Home colours	Away colours

During the 2010–11 season Ross County competed in the Scottish First Division, Challenge Cup, Scottish League Cup and the Scottish Cup.

== Summary ==
Ross County finished eighth in the First Division. They won the Challenge Cup, defeating Queen of the South 2–0 in the final, the second round of the League Cup and were eliminated in the fourth round of the Scottish Cup after a replay.

=== Management ===
They started season 2010–11 under the management of Derek Adams. On 11 November 2010, Adams resigned to become assistant manager of Hibernian with Craig Brewster becoming caretaker manager. On 25 November 2010, Willie McStay was appointed as manager, however after failing to win a game in his nine games in charge on 13 February 2011, he was sacked by the club. Four days later Jimmy Calderwood was appointed as manager until the end of the season.

== Results and fixtures ==
Win Draw Loss

=== Scottish First Division ===
7 August 2010 First Division	Cowdenbeath	0–2	Ross County	Central Park
		SFL Report	Gardyne 52'; Di Giacomo 82'	Attendance: 481; Referee: Winter

14 August 2010 First Division	Ross County	0–1	Falkirk	Victoria Park
		BBC Report	Flynn 36'	Attendance: 2,837; Referee: Brines

21 August 2010 First Division	Dundee	0–0	Ross County	Dens Park
		BBC Report		Attendance: 3,946; Referee: Thomson

28 August 2010 First Division	Queen of the South	3–0	Ross County	Palmerston Park
	Quinn 2'; Conroy 22'; McLaren 89'	BBC Report		Attendance: 1,644; Referee: Allan

11 September 2010 First Division	Ross County	0–0	Raith Rovers	Victoria Park
		BBC Report		Attendance: 2,500; Referee: Law

18 September 2010 First Division	Ross County	3–1	Stirling Albion	Victoria Park
	Wood 22', 50'; Morrison 38'	BBC Report	Smith 41'	Attendance: 2,125; Referee: Northcroft

25 September 2010 First Division	Greenock Morton	0–0	Ross County	Cappielow Park
		BBC Report		Attendance: 1,632; Referee: Robertson

2 October 2010 First Division	Ross County	0–2	Partick Thistle	Victoria Park
		BBC Report	Boyle 13'; Erskine 83'	Attendance: 2,263; Referee: Somers

16 October 2010 First Division	Dunfermline Athletic	3–2	Ross County	East End Park
	Gibson 28'; Clarke 44'; McDougall 90'	BBC Report	Boyd 25'; Craig 48'	Attendance: 2,803; Referee: McLean

23 October 2010 First Division	Raith Rovers	1–0	Ross County	Stark's Park
	Mole 93'	BBC Report		Attendance: 1,776; Referee: Winter

30 October 2010 First Division	Ross County	1–1	Queen of the South	Victoria Park
	Vigurs 81'	BBC Report	McMenamin 18'	Attendance: 2,186; Referee: Colvin

6 November 2010 First Division	Falkirk	0–1	Ross County	Falkirk Stadium
		BBC Report	Barrowman 27'	Attendance: 4,512; Referee: McDonald

13 November 2010 First Division	Ross County	0–3	Dundee	Victoria Park
		BBC Report	Griffiths 18', 75'; Riley 51'	Attendance: 2,331; Referee: O'Reilly

11 December 2010 First Division	Partick Thistle	1–1	Ross County	Firhill
	Erskine 40'	BBC Report	Brittain 18' (pen.)	Attendance: 1,509; Referee: Steve Conroy

14 December 2010 First Division	Ross County	2–2	Greenock Morton	Victoria Park
	Barrowman 23'; Boyd 95'	BBC Report	Graham 26'; Jenkins 31'	Attendance: 1,759; Referee: Brines

2 January 2011 First Division	Dundee	2–0	Ross County	Dens Park
	Lockwood 28' (pen.); Harkins 83'	BBC Report	Kettlewell (yellow card) 64' (yellow-red card) 90'	Attendance: 4,725; Referee: McDermott

15 January 2011 First Division	Ross County	0–1	Raith Rovers	Victoria Park
		BBC Report	Ellis 65'	Attendance: 2,408; Referee: Nicholls

29 January 2011 First Division	Greenock Morton	2–1	Ross County	Cappielow Park
	Lyle 59'; Jenkins 82'	BBC Report	Craig 38'	Attendance: 1,675; Referee: Richmond

5 February 2011 First Division	Ross County	1–1	Cowdenbeath	Victoria Park
	Marr 30'	SFL Report	Fitzpatrick 52' (Own goal)	Attendance: 2,020; Referee: Winter

12 February 2011 First Division	Ross County	0–0	Stirling Albion	Victoria Park
		BBC Report		Attendance: 2,114; Referee: Hilland

22 February 2011 First Division	Ross County	0–0	Dunfermline Athletic	Victoria Park
		BBC Report		Attendance: 2,198; Referee: Northcroft

26 February 2011 First Division	Ross County	0–0	Partick Thistle	Victoria Park
		BBC		Attendance: 2,316; Referee: McKendrick

1 March 2011 First Division	Stirling Albion	0–0	Ross County	Forthbank Stadium
		BBC Report	Flynn (yellow card) 80' (red card)	Attendance: 514; Referee: Charleston

5 March 2011 First Division	Ross County	2–1	Falkirk	Victoria Park
	Brittain 24'; Barrowman 87'	BBC Report	Stewart 37'	Attendance: 2,676; Referee: Salmond

8 March 2011 First Division	Dunfermline Athletic	1–1	Ross County	East End Park
	Kirk 81' (pen.)	BBC Report	Barrowman 67'	Attendance: 1,699; Referee: McLean

19 March 2011 First Division	Ross County	1–2	Queen of the South	Victoria Park
	Barrowman 21'	BBC Report	Harris 26' (Penalty); Weatherston 44'	Attendance: 2,181; Referee: Colvin

22 March 2011 First Division	Raith Rovers	1–1	Ross County	Stark's Park
	Tade 55'	BBC Report	Flynn 49'	Attendance: 1,639; Referee: Finnie

26 March 2011 First Division	Ross County	2–0	Greenock Morton	Victoria Park
	Gardyne 45'; Milne 86'	BBC Report		Attendance: 2,379; Referee: O'Reilly

29 March 2011 First Division	Ross County	0–1	Dunfermline Athletic	Victoria Park
		BBC Report	Hardie 90'	Attendance: 2,059; Referee: Somers

2 April 2011 First Division	Stirling Albion	0–2	Ross County	Forthbank Stadium
		BBC Report	Vigurs 44'; Flynn 67'	Attendance: 461; Referee: Beaton

5 April 2011 First Division	Cowdenbeath	2–1	Ross County	Central Park
	Ramsay 6'; Linton 21'	SFL Report	Brittain 87' (Penalty)	Attendance: 296; Referee: Madden

16 April 2011 First Division	Partick Thistle	1–1	Ross County	Firhill
	Doolan 4' (pen.)	BBC Report	Lawson 37'	Attendance: 1,714; Referee: Colvin

23 April 2011 First Division	Ross County	0–1	Dundee	Victoria Park
		BBC Report	McIntosh 65'	Attendance: 3,205; Referee: Law

26 April 2011 First Division	Queen of the South	0–1	Ross County	Palmerston Park
		BBC Report	Gardyne 29'	Attendance: 266; Referee: Smith

30 April 2011 First Division	Falkirk	0–1	Ross County	Falkirk Stadium
		BBC Report	Flynn 90'	Attendance: 4,143; Referee: Richmond

7 May 2011 First Division	Ross County	3–0	Cowdenbeath	Victoria Park
	Morrison 32'; Boyd 83'; Corcoran 89'	SFL Report		Attendance: 2,886; Referee: Allan

=== Scottish Challenge Cup ===
24 July 2010 Challenge Cup round 1	Elgin City	1–2	Ross County	Borough Briggs
	Gunn 82'	SFL Report	Scott 55'; Lawson 62'	Attendance: 855; Referee: Waters

10 August 2010 Challenge Cup round 2	Ross County	3–1	Greenock Morton	Victoria Park
	McKinlay 37' (o.g.); Gardyne 58'; Scott 90'	SFL Report	Kelbie 16'	Attendance: 856; Referee: Collum

4 September 2010 Challenge Cup Round QF	Forfar Athletic	0–2	Ross County	Station Park
	Bolochoweckyj (red card) 59'	SFL Report	Lawson 11', 70'; Scott (red card) 56'	Attendance: 552; Referee: Muir

10 October 2010 Challenge Cup Round SF	Ross County	2–2 (a.e.t.) (4–3 p)	Partick Thistle	Victoria Park
	Morrison 54'; Barrowman 88'	SFL Report	Kinniburgh 8'; Boyle 64'	Attendance: 1,307; Referee: Conroy
	Penalties
	Brittain (penalty scored); Barrowman (penalty scored); Milne (penalty missed); Scott (penalty missed); Lawson (penalty scored); Craig (penalty scored)		(penalty scored) Cairney; (penalty missed) Flannigan; (penalty scored) Buchanan; (penalty scored) Erskine; (penalty missed) Boyle

10 April 2011 Challenge Cup Final	Queen of the South	0–2	Ross County	McDiarmid Park
		SFL Report	Barrowman 9'; Vigurs 39'	Attendance: 5,124; Referee: Norris

=== Scottish League Cup ===
31 July 2010 League Cup round 1	Ross County	2–1	Livingston	Victoria Park
	Di Giacomo 37'; Vigurs (red card) 67'; Barrowman 69'	BBC Report	Russell 48'	Attendance: 1,215; Referee: O'Reilly

25 August 2010 League Cup round 2	Ross County	3–3 (a.e.t.) (4–3 p)	St Mirren	Victoria Park
	Gardyne 69'; Brittain 78'; Craig 90'	BBC Report	McGregor 44'; Higdon 79'; McGowan 92'	Attendance: 1,239; Referee: Tumilty

22 September 2010 League Cup round 3	Ross County	1–2 (a.e.t.)	Dundee United	Victoria Park
	Vigurs 87'	BBC Report	Goodwillie 61 pen.' Boyd 101 o.g.'	Attendance: 2,269; Referee: Thomson

=== Scottish Cup ===
20 November 2010 Scottish Cup round 3	Ross County	4–1	Deveronvale	Victoria Park
	Miller 29'; Barrowman 45', 90'; Craig 62'; Lawson (red card) 86'	BBC Report	McKenzie 80' (Penalty)	Attendance: 1,170; Referee: Somers

8 January 2011 Scottish Cup round 4	Dundee United	0–0	Ross County	Tannadice
		BBC Report		Attendance: 4,041; Referee: Collum

18 January 2011 Scottish Cup round 4 Replay	Ross County	0–0 (a.e.t.) (3–4 p)	Dundee United	Victoria Park
		BBC Report		Attendance: 2,430; Referee: Collum

== League table ==
Pos	Team	Pld	W	D	L	GF	GA	GD	Pts	Promotion, qualification or relegation
6	Dundee	36	19	12	5	54	34	+20	44 (Note: Dundee were docked 25 points for entering administration. The deduction was temporarily lifted pending an appeal by the club, however the appeal failed and the deduction was reinstated.)	
7	Greenock Morton	36	11	10	15	39	43	−4	43	
8	Ross County	36	9	14	13	30	34	−4	41	
9	Cowdenbeath (R)	36	9	8	19	41	72	−31	35	Qualification for the First Division play-offs
10	Stirling Albion (R)	36	4	8	24	32	82	−50	20	Relegation to the Second Division

Source: SPFL
Rules for classification: 1) points; 2) goal difference; 3) number of goals scored.
(R) Relegated

== See also ==
- List of Ross County F.C. seasons
