= 2009–10 Ross County F.C. season =

Ross County
2009–10 season
- Chairman: David Siegel
- Manager: Derek Adams
- Stadium: Victoria Park
- First Division: Fifth place
- Challenge Cup: Semi-final, lost to Inverness Caledonian Thistle
- League Cup: Third round, lost to Dundee United
- Scottish Cup: Final, lost to Dundee United
- Top goalscorer: League: Richard Brittain (9); All: Michael Gardyne (13)
- Highest home attendance: 5,928 vs. Inverness Caledonian Thistle, 20 March 2010
- Lowest home attendance: 1,752 vs. Greenock Morton, 8 December 2009
- Average home league attendance: 2,465

The 2009–10 season was Ross County's second consecutive season in the Scottish First Division, having been promoted as champions of the Scottish Second Division at the end of 2007–08 season. They also competed in the Challenge Cup, League Cup, and Scottish Cup.

== Summary ==
Ross County finished fifth in the First Division. They did, however, reach the semi-finals of the Challenge Cup, and the third round of the League Cup. They also managed to gain entrance into the final round of the Scottish Cup, but lost to Dundee United.

== Results and fixtures ==
Win Draw Loss

=== Scottish First Division ===
8 August 2009 Scottish First Division	Ross County	2 – 1	Airdrie United	Victoria Park
	Di Giacomo 18'; Wood 32'	SFL Report; BBC Report	Baird 42' (Penalty); Lagana (yellow card) 45' (red card)	Attendance: 1,781; Referee: Thompson

15 August 2009 Scottish First Division	Partick Thistle	0 – 0	Ross County	Firhill Stadium
	McKeown (red card) 55'	BBC Report	Miller (red card) 34'	Attendance: 2,391; Referee: Allan

22 August 2009 Scottish First Division	Ross County	0 – 1	Raith Rovers	Victoria Park
		BBC Report	Hill 32'	Attendance: 2,088; Referee: O'Reilly

29 August 2009 Scottish First Division	Inverness Caledonian Thistle	1 – 3	Ross County	Caledonian Stadium
	Hayes 60'	BBC Report	di Giacomo 10'; Vigurs 53'; Brittain 76'	Attendance: 5,846; Referee: Finnie

12 September 2009 Scottish First Division	Ross County	3 – 2	Queen of the South	Victoria Park
	Brittain 46' (Penalty); Craig 48'; Gardyne 75'	BBC Report	Holmes 5'; Kean 52' (Penalty)	Attendance: 1,992; Referee: McLean

19 September 2009 Scottish First Division	Ross County	2 – 1	Ayr United	Victoria Park
	Brittain 12'; Craig 15'; Keddie (yellow card) 88' (red card)	BBC Report	Roberts 53'; McGowan (yellow card) 90' (red card)	Attendance: 1,885; Referee: Brown

26 September 2009 Scottish First Division	Dundee	2 – 0	Ross County	Dens Park
	Griffiths 59', 77'	BBC Report		Attendance: 4,682; Referee: Somers

10 October 2009 Scottish First Division	Greenock Morton	0 – 1	Ross County	Cappielow
		BBC Report	Wood 68'	Attendance: 2,154; Referee: Boyle

13 October 2009 Scottish First Division	Ross County	0 – 0	Dunfermline Athletic	Victoria Park
		BBC Report		Attendance: 1,757; Referee: Collum

17 October 2009 Scottish First Division	Airdrie United	0 – 1	Ross County	Excelsior Stadium
		SFL Report	Wood 78'	Attendance: 756; Referee: Law

24 October 2009 Scottish First Division	Ross County	2 – 2	Partick Thistle	Victoria Park
	Gardyne 40'; Scott (yellow card) 57' (red card); Lawson 69'	BBC Report	Erskine 62'; Buchanan 72'	Attendance: 2,369; Referee: Finnie

31 October 2009 Scottish First Division	Queen of the South	2 – 0	Ross County	Palmerston Park
	Burns 26'; Kean 43'	BBC Report		Attendance: 2,245; Referee: McKendrick

7 November 2009 Scottish First Division	Ross County	2 – 1	Inverness Caledonian Thistle	Victoria Park
	Boyd 18'; Gardyne 20'	BBC Report	Rooney 82'	Attendance: 5,506; Referee: Somers

14 November 2009 Scottish First Division	Ayr United	1 – 1	Ross County	Somerset Park
	Boyd 41'; Ryan Stevenson (red card) 60'	BBC Report	Roberts 82' (Penalty)	Attendance: 1,236; Referee: Brown

1 December 2009 Scottish First Division	Ross County	0 – 1	Dundee	Victoria Park
		BBC Report	Harkins 69'	Attendance: 2,005; Referee: Nicholls

8 December 2009 Scottish First Division	Ross County	3 – 1	Greenock Morton	Victoria Park
	Wood 49'; Brittain 67' (Penalty); Scott 90'	BBC Report	Paartalu 29'; Reid (red card) 85'	Attendance: 1,752; Referee: McKendrick

12 December 2009 Scottish First Division	Dunfermline Athletic	3 – 3	Ross County	East End Park
	Kirk 22', 35'; Gibson 40'	BBC Report	Brittain 8' (pen.); Lawson 24'; Vigurs 84'	Attendance: 2,381; Referee: Collum

19 December 2009 Scottish First Division	Ross County	5 – 3	Airdrie United	Victoria Park
	Craig 1'; Brittain 32', 63' (Penalty); Gardyne 48'; Scott 79'	SFL Report	Waddell 29'; O'Carroll 34'; McDonald 78' (Penalty)	Attendance: 1,823; Referee: Finnie

23 January 2010 Scottish First Division	Ross County	1 – 0	Ayr United	Victoria Park
	Boyd 51'	BBC Report		Attendance: 1,935; Referee: Muir

30 January 2010 Scottish First Division	Dundee	0 – 1	Ross County	Dens Park
		BBC Report	Lawson 44'	Attendance: 4,912; Referee: Tumilty

13 February 2010 Scottish First Division	Ross County	2 – 2	Dunfermline Athletic	Victoria Park
	Lawson 54'; Watt 85'	BBC Report	Phinn 10', 32'; Holmes (red card) 89'	Attendance: 2,213; Referee: McKendrick

27 February 2010 Scottish First Division	Partick Thistle	2 – 1	Ross County	Firhill Stadium
	Buchanan 30'; Hodge 54'	BBC Report	Barrowman 76'	Attendance: 2,192; Referee: Brown

6 March 2010 Scottish First Division	Ross County	1 – 0	Raith Rovers	Victoria Park
	Brittain 76' (Penalty)	BBC Report		Attendance: 2,033; Referee: Conroy

9 March 2010 Scottish First Division	Raith Rovers	2 – 1	Ross County	Stark's Park
	Walker 53'; Tade 83'	BBC Report	Barrowman 28'	Attendance: 1,186; Referee: Charleston

20 March 2010 Scottish First Division	Ross County	0 – 0	Inverness Caledonian Thistle	Victoria Park
		BBC Report		Attendance: 5,928; Referee: Tumilty

27 March 2010 Scottish First Division	Ross County	1 – 1	Dundee	Victoria Park
	Craig 87'	BBC Report	Hutchinson 50'	Attendance: 3,295; Referee: Thomson

30 March 2010 Scottish First Division	Inverness Caledonian Thistle	3 – 0	Ross County	Caledonian Thistle
	Foran 14'; Odhiambo 16'; Hayes 40'	BBC Report	Keddie (red card) 13'	Attendance: 5,411; Referee: MacDonald

3 April 2010 Scottish First Division	Dunfermline Athletic	1 – 2	Ross County	East End Park
	Bell 78'	BBC Report	Vigurs 15'; Barrowman 35'	Attendance: 2,641; Referee: Finnie

6 April 2010 Scottish First Division	Ross County	1 – 1	Queen of the South	Victoria Park
	Boyd 90'	BBC Report	Burns 64'; McMillan (yellow card) 53' (red card)	Attendance: 2,004; Referee: McLean

13 April 2010 Scottish First Division	Greenock Morton	1 – 1	Ross County	Cappielow
	Monti 6' (Penalty)	BBC Report	Gardyne 39'	Attendance: 1,219; Referee: McDermott

17 April 2010 Scottish First Division	Airdrie United	1 – 1	Ross County	Excelsior Stadium
	McDonald 90' (Penalty)	SFL Report	Craig 63'	Attendance: 798; Referee: Nicholson

20 April 2010 Scottish First Division	Queen of the South	1 – 0	Ross County	Palmerston Park
	McLaren 54'	BBC Report		Attendance: 1,183; Referee: O'Reilly

24 April 2010 Scottish First Division	Ross County	1 – 2	Partick Thistle	Victoria Park
	Di Giacomo 58'	BBC Report	Donnelly 60'; Grehan 74'	Attendance: 2,175; Referee: Somers

26 April 2010 Scottish First Division	Ross County	2 – 1	Greenock Morton	Victoria Park
	Brittain 26'; Barrowman 92'	BBC Report	Witteveen 52'	Attendance: 1,830; Referee: Charleston

28 April 2010 Scottish First Division	Ayr United	0 – 1	Ross County	Somerset Park
		BBC Report	Barrowman 35' (Penalty)	Attendance: 1,032; Referee: Winter

1 May 2010 Scottish First Division	Raith Rovers	4 – 1	Ross County	Stark's Park
	Armstrong 4'; Russell 30', 36', 71'	BBC Report	Morrison 46'	Attendance: 1,935; Referee: Murray

=== Scottish Challenge Cup ===
25 July 2009 Scottish Challenge Cup round 1	Ross County	3 – 2 (a.e.t.)	Alloa Athletic	Victoria Park
	Gardyne 58', 106', 118'	BBC Report	Watt 4' (o.g.); Spence 99'; Carroll (red card) 110'	Attendance: 748; Referee: McDonald

18 August 2009 Scottish Challenge Cup round 2	Ross County	2 – 1	Greenock Morton	Victoria Park
	Lawson 68'; Wood 70'	BBC Report	Masterton 63'	Attendance: 588; Referee: McKendrick

6 September 2009 Scottish Challenge Cup QF	Ross County	2 – 0	Queen of the South	Victoria Park
	di Giacomo 26'; Craig 90'	BBC Report		Attendance: 964; Referee: Tumilty

4 October 2009 Scottish Challenge Cup SF	Inverness Caledonian Thistle	1 – 0	Ross County	Caledonian Stadium
	Eagle 44'	BBC Report		Attendance: 2,275; Referee: O'Reilly

=== Scottish League Cup ===
1 August 2009 Scottish League Cup round 1	Ross County	5 – 0	Montrose	Victoria Park
	Craig 43'; Gardyne 56', 75'; Morrison 72'; Stewart 79'	BBC Report		Attendance: 768; Referee: Tumilty

25 August 2009 Scottish League Cup round 2	Ross County	2 – 1	Hamilton Academical	Victoria Park
	Di Giacomo 32'; Brittain 53'	BBC Report	Mensing 90' (+3)	Attendance: 764; Referee: Muir

22 September 2009 Scottish League Cup round 3	Ross County	0 – 2	Dundee United	Victoria Park
	Scott (red card) 83'	BBC Report	Wilkie 36'; Russell 77'	Attendance: 1,986; Referee: Thomson

=== Scottish Cup ===
28 November 2009 Scottish Cup round 3	Ross County	5 – 1	Berwick Rangers	Victoria Park
	Di Giacomo 38', 40'; Lawson 42'; Craig 82'; Wood 87'	BBC Report	Brazil 77'	Attendance: 819; Referee: Madden

18 January 2010 Scottish Cup round 4	Ross County	4 – 0	Inverurie Loco Works	Victoria Park
	Craig 37', 56'; Morrison 53'; Miller 73'	BBC Report		Attendance: 835; Referee: McLean

6 February 2010 Scottish Cup round 5	Ross County	9 – 0	Stirling Albion	Victoria Park
	Keddie 3'; Gardyne 15', 20'; Wood 55', 59', 90'; Brittain 66' (pen.); Kettlewell 83'; Morrison 84'	BBC Report		Attendance: 1,365; Referee: Norris

13 March 2010 Scottish Cup QF	Hibernian	2 – 2	Ross County	Easter Road
	Nish 7'; Riordan 19'	BBC Report	Murray 16' (o.g.); Gardyne 79'	Attendance: 9,857; Referee: Winter

23 March 2010 Scottish Cup QF Replay	Ross County	2 – 1	Hibernian	Victoria Park
	Wood 70'; Boyd 90'	BBC Report	Stokes 46'	Attendance: 5,607; Referee: Winter

10 April 2010 Scottish Cup SF	Celtic	0 – 2	Ross County	Hampden Park
		BBC Report	Craig 55'; Scott 88'	Attendance: 24,535; Referee: Collum

15 May 2010 Scottish Cup Final	Ross County	0 – 3	Dundee United	Hampden Park
		BBC Report	Goodwillie 61'; Conway 75', 86'	Attendance: 47,122; Referee: McDonald

== Player statistics ==
=== Squad ===
No.	Pos	Nat	Player	Total		First Division		Challenge Cup		League Cup		Scottish Cup	
No.	Pos	Nat	Player	Apps	Goals	Apps	Goals	Apps	Goals	Apps	Goals	Apps	Goals
	GK	(Northern Ireland) NIR	Michael McGovern	49	0	35+0	0	4+0	0	3+0	0	7+0	0
	GK	(Scotland) SCO	Joe Malin	1	0	1+0	0	0+0	0	0+0	0	0+0	0
	DF	(Scotland) SCO	Scott Boyd	40	5	29+2	4	2+0	0	0+0	0	7+0	1
	DF	(Scotland) SCO	Graham Girvan	6	0	3+1	0	1+0	0	1+0	0	0+0	0
	DF	(Scotland) SCO	Alex Keddie	43	1	30+0	0	3+0	0	3+0	0	7+0	1
	DF	(Scotland) SCO	Gary Miller	43	1	31+1	0	2+0	0	2+0	0	7+0	1
	DF	(Scotland) SCO	Scott Morrison	49	4	35+0	1	4+0	0	3+0	1	7+0	2
	DF	(Scotland) SCO	Robbie Stephen	1	0	1+0	0	0+0	0	0+0	0	0+0	0
	DF	(Scotland) SCO	Steven Watt	28	1	16+3	1	4+0	0	3+0	0	0+2	0
	MF	(Scotland) SCO	Richard Brittain	48	11	34+0	9	4+0	0	3+0	1	7+0	1
	MF	(Scotland) SCO	Ross Grant	1	0	0+1	0	0+0	0	0+0	0	0+0	0
	MF	(Scotland) SCO	Stuart Kettlewell	39	1	22+9	0	3+0	0	1+0	0	1+3	1
	MF	(Scotland) SCO	Paul Lawson	42	6	25+3	4	3+1	1	3+0	0	5+2	1
	MF	(Scotland) SCO	Daniel Moore	7	0	0+3	0	2+1	0	0+1	0	0+0	0
	MF	(Scotland) SCO	Martin Scott	43	3	20+10	2	1+2	0	1+2	0	6+1	1
	MF	(England) ENG	Grant Smith	4	0	1+3	0	0+0	0	0+0	0	0+0	0
	MF	(Scotland) SCO	Iain Vigurs	48	3	25+10	3	4+0	0	3+0	0	5+1	0
	FW	(Scotland) SCO	Andrew Barrowman	19	5	12+2	5	0+0	0	0+0	0	4+1	0
	FW	(England) ENG	Steven Craig	33	11	12+12	5	0+2	1	2+0	1	3+2	4
	FW	(Scotland) SCO	Paul di Giacomo	39	7	20+11	3	3+0	1	1+1	1	2+1	2
	FW	(Scotland) SCO	Michael Gardyne	48	13	30+4	5	2+2	3	3+0	2	7+0	3
	FW	(Scotland) SCO	John Stewart	6	1	0+2	0	0+2	0	0+2	1	0+0	0
	FW	(Scotland) SCO	Gary Wood	42	10	14+16	4	2+2	1	1+2	0	2+3	5

== League table ==
Pos	Team	Pld	W	D	L	GF	GA	GD	Pts
3	Dunfermline Athletic	36	17	7	12	54	44	+10	58
4	Queen of the South	36	15	11	10	53	40	+13	56
5	Ross County	36	15	11	10	46	44	+2	56
6	Partick Thistle	36	14	6	16	43	40	+3	48
7	Raith Rovers	36	11	9	16	36	47	−11	42

Source: Scottish Football League
Rules for classification: 1) points; 2) goal difference; 3) number of goals scored.
First Division play-offs: The 9th place team will be entered into a play-off with the 2nd, 3rd and 4th places of the Second Division. The winner gets a place in the 2010-11 First Division

== See also ==
- List of Ross County F.C. seasons
