= 2011 Scottish Challenge Cup final =

- Event: 2010–11 Scottish Challenge Cup
Queen of the South	Ross County
0	2
- Date: 10 April 2011
- Venue: McDiarmid Park, Perth
- Referee: Euan Norris
- Attendance: 5,124

The 2011 Scottish Challenge Cup final was played between Queen of the South and Ross County at McDiarmid Park, Perth. Ross County won 2–0. The game had been postponed from November to April due to inclement weather.

Queen of the South beat Peterhead 2–1 in their semi-final and Ross County beat Partick Thistle 4–3 on penalties after their semi-final ended at 2–2.

== Appearances in previous finals ==
Queen of the South have appeared in the final twice before, winning the 2002 final 2–0 against Brechin City, but losing the 1997 final 1–0 to Falkirk. Ross County have appeared in three Challenge Cup finals to date, defeating Clyde on penalties in the 2006 final but losing the 2004 final to Falkirk, and the 2008 final to Airdrie United on penalties.

Both teams have recently appeared in the Scottish Cup final. Queens were beaten 3–2 in 2008 Scottish Cup final by Rangers. County were beaten 3–0 by Dundee United two years later in the 2010 Scottish Cup final.

== Postponement ==
The game was originally scheduled to be played on 28 November 2010. However the game was postponed at noon the day before the game after consultation with police voicing concerns over weather conditions particularly on the A9. Due to the Scottish football referee strike, the original fixture was scheduled to be officiated by foreign officials. The revised final date was 10 April 2011.

== TV coverage ==
The match was televised live on BBC Alba.

== Match summary ==
The game was played in unseasonally warm conditions with bright sunshine and a good natured atmosphere generated by both sets of fans. An early goal gave County a dream start but it was a nightmare for Queens and in particular goalkeeper David Hutton. Asked to deal with a routine passback by Queens captain David Lilley, a combination or poor decision making and poor ball control on Hutton's part allowed Andrew Barrowman to exert pressure and dispossess him. Barrowman easily rolled the ball into the empty net from one yard in the eighth minute to make the score 1–0 against his former club.

Queens only exerted pressure in the five-minute period leading up to County's second goal when they forced goalmouth scrambles. However, a swift County counterattack led to a ball from the right wing, with Iain Vigurs scoring from close range in 39 minutes to make it 2–0.

County were deserved winners without having to exert themselves against a Queens side who were easily second best in all departments and short of ideas other than aiming long balls at Derek Holmes.

== Match details ==
10 April 2011
15:00

Queen of the South	0 – 2	Ross County
	Report	Barrowman 9'; Vigurs 39'

McDiarmid Park, Perth
Attendance: 5,124
Referee: Euan Norris

Queen of the South	Ross County

QUEEN OF THE SOUTH:
GK	1	(Scotland) David Hutton
CB	2	(Scotland) Craig Reid
LM	3	(Scotland) Bob Harris
CB	4	(Scotland) Ryan McGuffie
CB	5	(Scotland) David Lilley	Booked
CM	6	(Scotland) Stephen McKenna	Booked
RM	7	(Scotland) Daniel Carmichael		(substituted off) 72'
CM	8	(Scotland) Paul Burns
CF	9	(Scotland) Derek Holmes
CM	10	(Scotland) Allan Johnston
CF	11	(Scotland) Willie McLaren
Substitutes:
GK	12	(Scotland) Roddy McKenzie
MF	14	(Scotland) Ian McShane
DF	15	(Scotland) Steven Black
FW	16	(Scotland) Steven Degnan		(substituted in) 72'
FW	17	(Scotland) Ryan Smylie
Manager:
(Scotland) Kenny Brannigan

ROSS COUNTY:
GK	1	(Northern Ireland) Michael McGovern
RB	2	(Scotland) Gary Miller
LB	3	(Scotland) Marc Fitzpatrick
LM	4	(Scotland) Paul Lawson	Booked	(substituted off) 90'
CB	5	(Scotland) Scott Boyd
CB	6	(Northern Ireland) Johnny Flynn
RM	7	(Scotland) Michael Gardyne		(substituted off) 87'
CM	8	(Scotland) Stuart Kettlewell
CF	9	(Scotland) Andrew Barrowman	Booked	(substituted off) 90'
CM	10	(Scotland) Richard Brittain (c)
CF	11	(Scotland) Iain Vigurs
Substitutes:
FW	12	(Scotland) Steven Milne		(substituted in) 87'
FW	14	(Scotland) Gary Wood		(substituted in) 90'
FW	15	(Scotland) Steven Craig
DF	16	(Scotland) Scott Morrison		(substituted in) 90'
GK	18	(Scotland) Joe Malin
Manager:
(Scotland) Jimmy Calderwood

== Road to the final ==
Queen of the South

	Home team	Score	Away team
Round 1	Queen of the South	2 – 1	Albion Rovers
Round 2	Dunfermline Athletic	1 – 1; 5 – 6 (pens)	Queen of the South
Quarter-final	Queen of the South	5 – 0	East Fife
Semi-final	Peterhead	1 – 2	Queen of the South

Ross County

	Home team	Score	Away team
Round 1	Elgin City	1 – 2	Ross County
Round 2	Ross County	3 – 1	Greenock Morton
Quarter-final	Forfar Athletic	0 – 2	Ross County
Semi-final	Ross County	2 – 2; 4 – 3 (pens)	Partick Thistle
