= List of Ross County F.C. seasons =

This is a list of seasons played by Ross County Football Club in Scottish football from when they were admitted to the Scottish Football League in 1994 to the present day.

== Key ==
Key to divisions

- Premier League – Scottish Premier League
- Premiership – Scottish Premiership
- First Division – Scottish Football League First Division
- Second Division – Scottish Football League Second Division
- Third Division – Scottish Football League Third Division

Key to positions and symbols

- 1st – Champions
- 2nd – Runners-up
- 3rd – 3rd place
- ↑ – Promoted
- ↓ – Relegated

Key to rounds

- GS - Group Stage
- R1 – Round 1, etc.
- QF – Quarter-finals
- SF – Semi-finals
- RU – Runners-up
- W – Winners

== Seasons ==
Season	League											Scottish Cup	League Cup	Challenge Cup	Average Attendance
Season	Division	Tier	P	W	D	L	F	A	GD	Pts	Pos	Scottish Cup	League Cup	Challenge Cup	Average Attendance
1929–30	Highland League	-	22	7	3	12	44	54	-10	17	7th				
1930–31	Highland League	-	22	9	5	8	59	40	19	23	4th				
1931–32	Highland League	-	26	10	6	10	67	75	-8	26	7th				
1932–33	Highland League	-	26	10	4	12	50	56	-6	22 (Note: 2 points deducted for fielding ineligible players)	10th				
1933–34	Highland League	-	26	13	2	11	76	67	9	28	7th	R3			
1934–35	Highland League	-	24	7	3	14	53	80	-27	17	10th				
1935–36	Highland League	-	22	7	6	9	49	58	-9	20	7th	R1			
1936–37	Highland League	-	22	7	2	13	47	72	-25	16	12th				
1937–38	Highland League	-	22	12	2	8	63	61	3	26	4th	R2			
1938–39	Highland League	-	26	12	3	11	74	80	-6	27	5th				
Not held due to World War II															
1946–47	Highland League	-	30	16	2	12	76	60	16	34	6th				
1947–48	Highland League	-	30	15	3	12	103	98	5	33	9th				
1948–49	Highland League	-	30	15	5	10	92	74	18	35	6th				
1949–50	Highland League	-	30	12	4	14	66	73	-9	28	9th	R1			
1950–51	Highland League	-	28	11	5	12	79	82	-3	27	10th				
1951–52	Highland League	-	28	8	7	13	60	69	-9	23	11th				
1952–53	Highland League	-	28	15	1	12	81	64	17	31	4th				
1953–54	Highland League	-	28	7	3	18	52	91	-39	17	13th				
1954–55	Highland League	-	28	8	4	16	52	60	-8	20	11th (Note: Season abandoned and no Championship awarded)	R1			
1955–56	Highland League	-	27 (Note: Ross County v Inverness Thistle not played)	10	2	15	36	58	-22	22	9th	R3			
1956–57	Highland League	-	28	8	5	15	58	79	-21	21	12th	R4			
1957–58	Highland League	-	28	10	3	15	54	71	-17	23	12th				
1958–59	Highland League	-	28	12	2	14	54	62	-8	26	10th	R1			
1959–60	Highland League	-	28	16	4	8	64	46	19	36	4th				
1960–61	Highland League	-	28	3	8	17	41	68	-27	14	14th				
1961–62	Highland League	-	28	12	7	9	54	51	3	31	7th	R3			
1962–63	Highland League	-	26 (Note: Keith v Ross County & Ross County v Keith not played)	9	4	13	58	56	2	22	11th				
1963–64	Highland League	-	30	13	2	15	76	83	-9	28	11th				
1964–65	Highland League	-	30	17	5	8	109	68	41	39	4th				
1965–66	Highland League	-	29 (Note: Keith v Ross County not played)	19	2	8	92	50	42	40	3rd	R2			
1966–67	Highland League	-	30	24	4	2	107	32	75	52	1st				
1967–68	Highland League	-	30	22	5	3	82	35	47	49	2nd				
1968–69	Highland League	-	30	17	9	4	83	46	37	43	3rd	P1			
1969–70	Highland League	-	30	20	4	6	95	33	62	44	4th	P2			
1970–71	Highland League	-	30	15	7	8	71	49	22	37	5th	R2			
1971–72	Highland League	-	30	12	7	11	61	56	5	31	6th				
1972–73	Highland League	-	30	20	7	3	72	34	38	47	2nd (Note: Lost Championship playoff 2-1 to Inverness Thistle)	R1			
1973–74	Highland League	-	30	15	4	11	81	42	39	34	7th	R2			
1974–75	Highland League	-	30	13	6	11	66	59	7	32	7th	R3			
1975–76	Highland League	-	30	12	9	9	64	62	2	33	8th				
1976–77	Highland League	-	30	9	3	18	52	66	-14	21	12th				
1977–78	Highland League	-	30	19	7	4	73	41	32	45	3rd				
1978–79	Highland League	-	30	17	4	9	52	33	19	38	5th				
1979–80	Highland League	-	30	14	9	7	65	57	8	37	4th				
1980–81	Highland League	-	30	13	3	14	51	59	-8	29	11th				
1981–82	Highland League	-	30	12	9	9	61	52	9	33	6th				
1982–83	Highland League	-	30	12	4	14	68	68	0	40 (Note: First season with 3 points for a win)	9th				
1983–84	Highland League	-	30	7	9	14	51	63	-12	30	13th				
1984–85	Highland League	-	30	14	6	10	53	47	6	48	6th				
1985–86	Highland League	-	32	11	4	17	65	66	-1	37	10th				
1986–87	Highland League	-	34	5	3	26	31	92	-61	18	18th				
1987–88	Highland League	-	34	19	2	13	67	39	28	59	8th				
1988–89	Highland League	-	34	18	3	13	61	51	10	57	8th				
1989–90	Highland League	-	34	13	5	16	54	54	0	44	11th	R2			
1990–91	Highland League	-	34	24	4	6	91	37	54	76	1st	R3			
1991–92	Highland League	-	34	24	3	7	95	43	52	75	1st	R2			
1992–93	Highland League	-	34	19	7	8	87	49	38	64	5th				
1993–94	Highland League	-	34	21	4	9	80	51	29	67	3rd	R3			
1994–95	Third Division	4	36	18	6	12	59	44	15	60	3rd	R3	R2	R1	1,566
1995–96	Third Division	4	36	12	17	7	56	39	17	53	4th	R3	R1	R1	1,749
1996–97	Third Division	4	36	20	7	9	58	41	17	67	3rd	R1	R1	R1	1,789
1997–98	Third Division	4	36	19	10	7	71	36	35	67	3rd	R4	R2	R2	1,330
1998–99	Third Division	4	36	24	5	7	87	42	45	77	1st ↑	R3	QF	N/A (Note: The 1998–99 Challenge Cup tournament was suspended due to lack of sponsorship.)	1,643
1999–2000	Second Division	3	36	18	8	10	57	39	18	62	3rd ↑	R3	R2	QF	2,293
2000–01	First Division	2	36	11	10	15	48	52	−4	43	6th	R4	R2	R2	2,789
2001–02	First Division	2	36	14	10	12	51	43	8	52	4th	R3	QF	QF	2,757
2002–03	First Division	2	36	9	8	19	42	46	−4	35	8th	R3	R3	QF	2,678
2003–04	First Division	2	36	12	13	11	49	41	8	49	6th	R3	R2	QF	3,203
2004–05	First Division	2	36	13	8	15	40	37	3	47	6th	R4	R2	RU	2,336
2005–06	First Division	2	36	14	14	8	47	40	7	56	4th	R4	R2	R2	2,302
2006–07	First Division	2	36	9	10	17	40	57	−17	37	10th ↓	R3	R2	W	2,344
2007–08	Second Division	3	36	22	7	7	78	44	34	73	1st ↑	R5	R2	R2	2,246
2008–09	First Division	2	36	13	8	15	42	46	−4	47	8th	R4	R1	RU	2,225
2009–10	First Division	2	36	15	11	10	46	44	2	56	5th	RU	R3	SF	2,465
2010–11	First Division	2	36	9	14	13	30	34	−4	41	8th	R4	R3	W	2,358
2011–12	First Division	2	36	22	13	1	72	32	40	79	1st ↑	R5	R3	R1	2,872
2012–13	Premier League	1	38	13	14	11	47	48	−1	53	5th	R4	R2	N/A	4,429
2013–14	Premiership	1	38	11	7	20	44	62	−18	40	7th	R4	R2	N/A	3,787
2014–15	Premiership	1	38	12	8	18	46	63	−17	44	9th	R3	R4	N/A	3,525
2015–16	Premiership	1	38	14	6	18	55	61	−6	48	6th	QF	W	N/A	4,287
2016–17	Premiership	1	38	11	13	14	48	58	−10	43	7th	R5	R1	N/A	4,103
2017–18	Premiership	1	38	6	11	21	40	62	−22	29	12th ↓	R4	R2	N/A	4,612
2018–19	Championship	2	36	21	8	7	63	34	29	71	1st ↑	R5	R2	W	3,849
2019–20	Premiership	1	30	7	8	15	29	60	−31	29	10th	R4	R2	N/A	4,664
2020–21	Premiership	1	38	11	6	21	35	66	−31	39	10th	R3	QF	N/A	68
2021–22	Premiership	1	38	10	11	17	47	61	−14	41	6th	R4	GS	N/A	3,978
2022–23	Premiership	1	38	9	7	22	37	60	−23	34	11th	R4	R2	N/A	4,053
2023–24	Premiership	1	38	8	11	19	38	67	−29	35	11th	R4	QF	N/A	4,022
2024–25	Premiership	1	38	9	10	19	37	65	−28	37	11th ↓	R4	R2	N/A	4,372
2025–26	Championship	2	36	8	10	18	36	57	−21	34	10th ↓	R4	GS	R3	2,880

Since joining the Scottish Football League in 1994, Ross County have gained 5 promotions and 4 relegations.
