= Michael McGovern (footballer) =

Northern Irish footballer

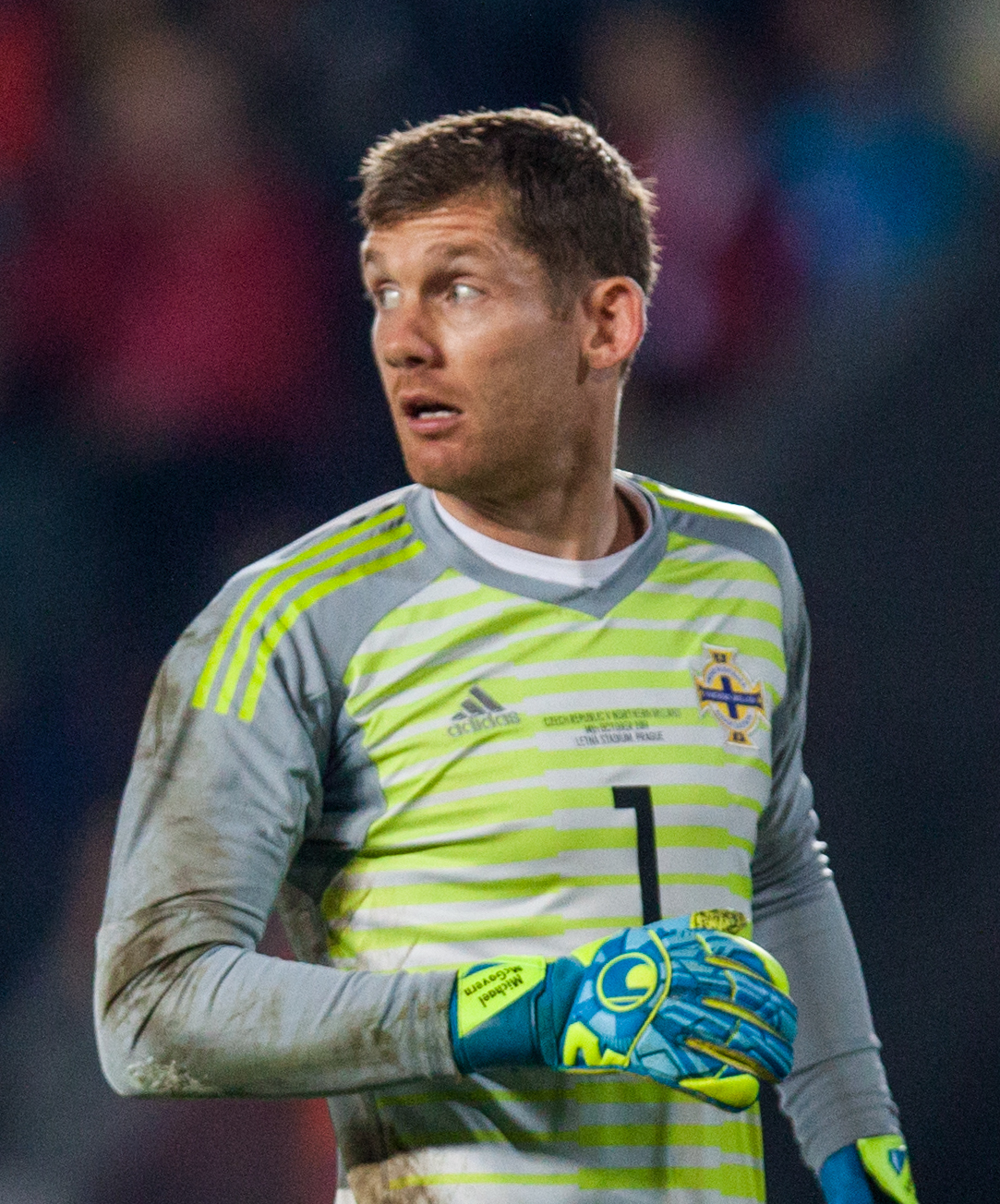
- McGovern playing for Northern Ireland in 2019

Personal information
- Full name: Michael McGovern
- Date of birth: 12 July 1984 (age 42)
- Place of birth: Enniskillen, Northern Ireland
- Height: 6 ft 3 in (1.91 m)
- Position: Goalkeeper

Team information
- Current team: Queen's Park (goalkeeping coach)

Youth career
- –2001: Enniskillen Town United
- 2001–2004: Celtic

Senior career*
Years	Team	Apps	(Gls)
2004–2008	Celtic	0	(0)
2005	→ Stranraer (loan)	19	(0)
2006	→ St Johnstone (loan)	1	(0)
2008–2009	Dundee United	0	(0)
2009–2011	Ross County	71	(0)
2011–2014	Falkirk	105	(0)
2014–2016	Hamilton Academical	75	(0)
2016–2023	Norwich City	32	(0)
2023–2024	Heart of Midlothian	0	(0)
2024	→ Livingston (loan)	3	(0)
Total		306	(0)

International career
	Northern Ireland U19	3	(0)
2005–2006	Northern Ireland U21	10	(0)
2010–2020	Northern Ireland	33	(0)
- * Club domestic league appearances and goals

Michael McGovern (born 12 July 1984) is a Northern Irish former professional footballer who played as a goalkeeper. He has represented the Northern Ireland national team at international level and is currently goalkeeping coach at Scottish Championship club Queen's Park.

Born in Enniskillen, McGovern started his career with Scottish Premier League club Celtic in 2001. He spent time on loan with Scottish Second Division side Stranraer in 2005 and with Scottish First Division side St Johnstone in 2006. He left Celtic in 2008, having never made a first-team appearance for the club. After leaving Celtic, he joined fellow Scottish Premier League side Dundee United, but left after one season having not made a first-team appearance. In 2009, he went back to the First Division with Ross County, where he enjoyed a successful two-year spell. In 2011, he moved on a free transfer to fellow First Division side Falkirk. McGovern then moved to Hamilton Academical in 2014. After spending 15 years playing in Scotland, he moved to English club Norwich City in July 2016.

McGovern represented Northern Ireland at under-19 and under-21 levels, before making his senior debut in May 2010. He represented Northern Ireland at UEFA Euro 2016.

== Club career ==
=== Celtic ===
McGovern joined Celtic in July 2001 from hometown junior club Enniskillen Town United. His first involvement with the first-team squad was as a substitute at the Camp Nou during Celtic's UEFA Cup match against Barcelona in March 2004. In January 2005, McGovern joined Stranraer on loan. He joined St Johnstone on a one-month emergency loan in December 2006. While at Celtic, he managed to pick up a Scottish Cup winners medal in 2004 and 2007, both times as an unused substitute.

=== Dundee United ===
On 17 June 2008, McGovern agreed a pre-contract move to Dundee United, signing a one-year deal. He failed to make a first-team appearance for United and manager Craig Levein confirmed McGovern's departure in May 2009.

=== Ross County ===
McGovern moved to Ross County in late June 2009 and enjoyed a successful first season. This included playing in the 2010 Scottish Cup Final, which Ross County lost 3–0 to McGovern's former club Dundee United, and making his full international debut.

In his second season at the club, McGovern saved two penalties in a 4–3 penalty shoot-out win against Partick Thistle in the Scottish Challenge Cup semi-final on 10 October 2010. He played in the final on 10 April 2011, as Ross County lifted the trophy after a 2–0 win against Queen of the South at McDiarmid Park. McGovern left Ross County at the end of the 2010–11 Scottish First Division season.

=== Falkirk ===
After leaving Ross County, McGovern joined up with St Johnstone for pre-season training before he signed for Falkirk on 20 July 2011. He quickly established himself as first choice goalkeeper and on 21 September 2011, played in Falkirk's 3–2 Scottish League Cup win over holders Rangers. On 1 April 2012, he played for Falkirk in their 1–0 win over Hamilton in the 2012 Scottish Challenge Cup Final. At the end of the season he won the Falkirk Players' Player of the Year award and Falkirk Supporters Club Player of the Year award. He was among four players nominated for the PFA Scotland First Division Player of the Year award and he was named in the PFA Scotland 2012–13 First Division Team of the Year. On 17 May 2012, he signed a new one-year contract.

McGovern was named Falkirk Players' Player of the Year for the second year in succession at the end of the 2012–13 season. He signed a new one-year deal at Falkirk on 24 June 2013 and was appointed club captain upon the departure of Darren Dods. On 18 April 2014, McGovern was named in the PFA Scotland 2013–14 Championship Team of the Year.

=== Hamilton Academical ===
On 9 June 2014, McGovern signed for Scottish Premiership club Hamilton Academical on a one-year contract. He made his debut on 2 August 2014, in a 2–1 win against Arbroath in the Scottish League Cup. On 5 October 2014, he played in Hamilton Academical's 1–0 victory over Celtic, which was their first victory at Celtic Park in 76 years. During September and October 2014, McGovern set a club record of 437 minutes without conceding a goal in the Scottish top flight. On 28 November 2014, he extended his contract at Hamilton Academical by a further year, until 2016. In January 2015, McGovern became club captain after the incumbent Martin Canning was promoted to manager following Alex Neil's departure to Norwich City.

=== Norwich City ===
On 19 July 2016, it was revealed that McGovern had signed for Championship club Norwich City on a three-year deal. He made his debut on 13 August 2016, replacing John Ruddy at half-time in Norwich City's 0–0 draw with Sheffield Wednesday. Throughout his time at Norwich, McGovern played a crucial role within the squad, contributing significantly to the team's success and stability.

Premier League Appearances: McGovern made his Premier League debut during the 2019–20 season in a match against Crystal Palace at Selhurst Park, becoming Norwich City's oldest Premier League debutant.

Championship Winners Medals: McGovern was an integral part of the Norwich City squad that secured promotion to the Premier League by winning the EFL Championship in both the 2018–19 and 2020–21 seasons.

2018-19 Season: Although McGovern's appearances were limited during the 2018–19 season, his presence in the squad contributed to a strong team dynamic, helping Norwich clinch the Championship title.

2020-21 Season: The 2020–21 season saw McGovern play a number of key games, making significant contributions to the team's success. He stepped in as the starting goalkeeper following injuries to the first-choice keeper Tim Krul and performed admirably, helping Norwich maintain their strong form. Unfortunately, an injury later in the season sidelined him, but his earlier performances were crucial in Norwich's eventual promotion.

McGovern's tenure at Norwich City highlighted his reliability and professionalism, both on the field during critical moments and off the field as a mentor to younger players.

=== Heart of Midlothian ===
McGovern would then return to Scotland, signing a one-year deal with Heart of Midlothian in the summer of 2023. In January 2024 he would joined Livingston on loan until the end of the season. He was released by Hearts at the end of the season.

== Coaching career ==
Following his retirement as a player, McGovern took up the position of goalkeeping coach with Queen's Park. He left Queen's at the end of the 2024–25 season.

== International career ==
In March 2008, McGovern received his first call-up to the Northern Ireland squad. McGovern made his full debut for Northern Ireland on 31 May 2010, in a 1–0 loss to Chile. He came on at half-time for Alan Blayney and made a "stunning" save from a long-range effort by Marco Estrada.

McGovern became the number one goalkeeper for Northern Ireland, helping them qualify for Euro 2016 as qualifying group winners.

McGovern's performances during Euro 2016 were outstanding, particularly in the group stage match against Germany. He received plaudits for a series of "heroic saves" that restricted Germany to a 1–0 win during the group stages of the Euro 2016 finals on 21 June 2016, keeping Northern Ireland's goal difference down and helping them qualify for the knockout round of 16.

== Career statistics ==
=== Club ===
Club	Season	League			National Cup		League Cup		Continental		Other		Total	
Club	Season	Division	Apps	Goals	Apps	Goals	Apps	Goals	Apps	Goals	Apps	Goals	Apps	Goals
Celtic	2003–04	Scottish Premier League	0	0	0	0	0	0	0	0	—		0	0
Celtic	2004–05	Scottish Premier League	0	0	0	0	0	0	0	0	—		0	0
Celtic	2005–06	Scottish Premier League	0	0	0	0	0	0	0	0	—		0	0
Celtic	2006–07	Scottish Premier League	0	0	0	0	0	0	0	0	—		0	0
Celtic	2007–08	Scottish Premier League	0	0	0	0	0	0	0	0	—		0	0
Celtic	Total		0	0	0	0	0	0	0	0	—		0	0
Stranraer (loan)	2004–05	Scottish Second Division	19	0	0	0	0	0	—		0	0	19	0
St Johnstone (loan)	2006–07	Scottish First Division	1	0	0	0	0	0	—		0	0	1	0
Dundee United	2008–09	Scottish Premier League	0	0	0	0	0	0	—		—		0	0
Ross County	2009–10	Scottish First Division	35	0	7	0	3	0	—		4 (Note: Appearances in Scottish Challenge Cup)	0	49	0
Ross County	2010–11	Scottish First Division	36	0	3	0	3	0	—		5	0	47	0
Ross County	Total		71	0	10	0	6	0	—		9	0	96	0
Falkirk	2011–12	Scottish First Division	35	0	2	0	5	0	—		5	0	47	0
Falkirk	2012–13	Scottish First Division	35	0	4	0	2	0	—		2	0	43	0
Falkirk	2013–14	Scottish Championship	35	0	1	0	3	0	—		6 (Note: Two appearances in Scottish Challenge Cup and four appearances in Scottish Championship promotion play-offs)	0	45	0
Falkirk	Total		105	0	7	0	10	0	—		13	0	135	0
Hamilton Academical	2014–15	Scottish Premiership	38	0	1	0	4	0	—		—		43	0
Hamilton Academical	2015–16	Scottish Premiership	37	0	1	0	1	0	—		—		39	0
Hamilton Academical	Total		75	0	2	0	5	0	—		—		82	0
Norwich City	2016–17	Championship	20	0	2	0	0	0	—		—		22	0
Norwich City	2017–18	Championship	0	0	0	0	1	0	—		—		1	0
Norwich City	2018–19	Championship	0	0	1	0	4	0	—		—		5	0
Norwich City	2019–20	Premier League	2	0	1	0	0	0	—		—		3	0
Norwich City	2020–21	Championship	10	0	0	0	0	0	—		—		10	0
Norwich City	2021–22	Premier League	0	0	1	0	0	0	—		—		1	0
Norwich City	2022–23	Championship	0	0	0	0	0	0	—		—		0	0
Norwich City	Total		32	0	5	0	5	0	—		—		42	0
Career total			303	0	24	0	26	0	0	0	22	0	375	0

=== International ===
As of match played 15 November 2020

National team	Year	Apps	Goals
Northern Ireland	2010	1	0
Northern Ireland	2015	8	0
Northern Ireland	2016	10	0
Northern Ireland	2017	9	0
Northern Ireland	2018	2	0
Northern Ireland	2020	2	0
Total		32	0

== Honours ==
Celtic

- Scottish Cup: 2003–04, 2006–07

Ross County

- Scottish Challenge Cup: 2010–11
- Scottish Cup runner-up: 2009–10

Falkirk

- Scottish Challenge Cup: 2011–12

Norwich City

- EFL Championship: 2020–21
