= Gary Miller (footballer) =

Scottish footballer

Personal information
- Full name: Gary Miller
- Date of birth: 15 April 1987 (age 39)
- Place of birth: Glasgow, Scotland
- Height: 1.84 m (6 ft 1/2 in)
- Position: Central midfielder

Team information
- Current team: Greenock Morton (Assistant Manager and Head of Youth and Emerging Talent)

Senior career*
Years	Team	Apps	(Gls)
2003–2009	Livingston	40	(0)
2006	→ Ayr United (loan)	15	(1)
2007–2008	→ Ross County (loan)	20	(0)
2009–2012	Ross County	99	(1)
2012–2015	St Johnstone	61	(1)
2015–2016	Partick Thistle	21	(1)
2016–2018	Plymouth Argyle	46	(0)
2018–2019	Carlisle United	18	(1)
2019–2022	Falkirk	72	(0)
2022–2023	East Kilbride		
2023–2024	St Cadoc's		
- * Club domestic league appearances and goals

Gary Miller (born 15 April 1987) is a Scottish former footballer who is currently the assistant manager and Head of Youth and Emerging Talent at Greenock Morton.

During his playing career spanning over two decades, Miller played as a defensive midfielder or defender. He appeared for a number of clubs across Scotland and England, including Livingston, Ayr United (loan), Ross County, St Johnstone, Partick Thistle, Plymouth Argyle, Carlisle United, Falkirk, East Kilbride and St Cadoc's.

== Career ==
=== Livingston ===
Miller began his career at Livingston, making his debut a substitute on 29 October 2005, in a 1–1 draw away to Falkirk. He made 40 league appearances for Livingston during his six-year spell at the club.

On 31 August 2006, Miller moved on loan to Ayr United, where he scored his first career goal on his debut away to Forfar Athletic. He then spent the 2007–08 season on loan at Ross County, helping the club win the Second Division title.

=== Ross County ===
On 2 June 2009, Miller returned to Ross County, this time on a permanent basis. In his first season, the club reached the Scottish Cup Final, where Miller played the full ninety minutes, however it ended in defeat as Ross County lost 3–0 to Dundee United at Hampden.

In Miller's second season at Ross County, the club won the 2010–11 Scottish Challenge Cup, with a 2–0 victory against Queen of the South at McDiarmid Park. The following season, he helped Ross County win the 2011–12 Scottish First Division and promotion to the Scottish Premier League.

=== St Johnstone ===
In May 2012, Miller signed for St Johnstone, spending three years at the club where he was part of the side that competed in successive Europa League qualifiers. In the 2013–14 season, he made it to another Scottish Cup Final, where he was an unused substitute, however this time he collected a winners medal as St Johnstone beat Dundee United 2–0.

=== Partick Thistle ===
Miller signed a one-year contract with Scottish Premiership team Partick Thistle on 20 July 2015, after spending the summer on trial with the club. He scored his first goal for the club, a 25-yard volley against his former team St Johnstone in a 2–1 win for Thistle, on 17 October 2015. Miller rejected a new contract offer with Partick Thistle in June 2016 and subsequently left the club.

=== Plymouth Argyle ===
Miller signed for Football League Two club Plymouth Argyle on 23 June 2016, where he joined up with manager Derek Adams who had been his teammate at Livingston and Ross County and then his manager at Ross County.

=== Carlisle United ===
Miller signed for Football League Two club Carlisle United on 19 June 2018. At the end of the season, he was released by the club.

=== Falkirk ===
On 12 August 2019, Miller signed for Scottish League One club Falkirk on a contract until January 2020. Miller would end up spending three seasons at The Bairns, becoming club captain in 2020. He left Falkirk in the summer of 2022, having made 72 league appearances.

=== East Kilbride ===
Miller signed for East Kilbride in 2022.

== Coaching career ==
After a stint as Head of Youth at Alloa Athletic, Miller was appointed Head of Youth Academy & Emerging Talent at Greenock Morton in June 2025. After manager Dougie Imrie left the club in November 2025, Miller was put in temporary charge of the first team. He became the first team assistant manager after Ian Murray was appointed manager in January 2026, while also continuing in his head of youth role.

== Career statistics ==
As of 17 September 2019

Appearances and goals by club, season and competition
Club	Season	League			National Cup		League Cup		Other		Total	
Club	Season	Division	Apps	Goals	Apps	Goals	Apps	Goals	Apps	Goals	Apps	Goals
Livingston	2005–06	Scottish Premier League	4	0	0	0	0	0	0	0	4	0
Livingston	2006–07	Scottish First Division	13	0	1	0	0	0	1 (Note: Appearances in the Scottish Challenge Cup)	0	15	0
Livingston	2007–08	Scottish First Division	0	0	0	0	0	0	0	0	0	0
Livingston	2008–09	Scottish First Division	23	0	1	0	3	0	2	0	29	0
Livingston	Total		40	0	2	0	3	0	3	0	48	0
Ayr United (loan)	2006–07	Scottish Second Division	15	1	0	0	0	0	0	0	15	1
Ross County (loan)	2007–08	Scottish Second Division	20	0	3	0	0	0	0	0	23	0
Ross County	2009–10	Scottish First Division	32	0	7	1	2	0	2	0	43	1
Ross County	2010–11	Scottish First Division	31	0	2	1	3	0	5	0	41	1
Ross County	2011–12	Scottish First Division	36	1	4	0	3	0	1	0	44	1
Ross County	Total		99	1	13	2	8	0	8	0	128	3
St Johnstone	2012–13	Scottish Premier League	17	0	0	0	2	0	2 (Note: Appearances in the UEFA Europa League)	0	21	0
St Johnstone	2013–14	Scottish Premiership	25	1	1	0	3	0	2	0	31	1
St Johnstone	2014–15	Scottish Premiership	19	0	1	0	1	0	4	0	25	0
St Johnstone	Total		61	1	2	0	6	0	8	0	77	1
Partick Thistle	2015–16	Scottish Premiership	21	1	2	0	1	0	0	0	24	1
Plymouth Argyle	2016–17	League Two	31	0	4	0	1	0	2 (Note: Appearances in the EFL Trophy)	0	38	0
Plymouth Argyle	2017–18	League One	15	0	0	0	1	0	2	0	18	0
Plymouth Argyle	Total		46	0	4	0	2	0	4	0	56	0
Carlisle United	2018–19	League Two	18	1	0	0	3	0	1	0	22	1
Falkirk	2019–20	Scottish League One	0	0	0	0	0	0	2	0	2	0
Career total			320	5	26	2	23	0	26	0	395	7

== Honours ==
Ross County

- Scottish Second Division: 2007–08
- Scottish Challenge Cup: 2010–11
- Scottish First Division: 2011–12

St Johnstone

- Scottish Cup: 2013–14
