= Johnny Flynn (footballer) =

Northern Irish footballer (born 1989)

Personal information
- Full name: Jonathan Joseph Flynn
- Date of birth: 18 November 1989 (age 36)
- Place of birth: Belfast, Northern Ireland
- Position: Centre-back

Youth career
- Glenbawn Celtic
- Newhill

Senior career*
Years	Team	Apps	(Gls)
2007–2008	Ballymena United	15	(1)
2008–2010	Blackburn Rovers	0	(0)
2009	→ Chester City (loan)	4	(1)
2009	→ Accrington Stanley (loan)	8	(0)
2010–2012	Ross County	37	(4)
2012–2014	Falkirk	71	(0)
2014–2016	Cliftonville	22	(3)
2016–2018	Ballymena United	7	(1)
2018	Portadown	14	(0)
Total		178	(10)

International career
	Northern Ireland U19	10	(0)
2008–2010	Northern Ireland U21	10	(0)
- * Club domestic league appearances and goals as of 5 December 2018

Jonathan Joseph Flynn (born 18 November 1989) is a Northern Irish former professional footballer who played as a defender. Flynn began his career at Ballymena United, and later moved to Blackburn Rovers, where he failed to make a first-team appearance. He spent a short loan spell at Accrington Stanley in League Two, and between 2010 and 2012, he played for Ross County in the Scottish First Division before later moving to Falkirk.

Flynn has been capped by Northern Ireland at under-21 level.

He moved to Cliftonville for the 2014–15 season.

== Club career ==
=== Ballymena United ===
Flynn began his professional career in his native Northern Ireland with Ballymena United, after being spotted by Belfast-based scout Dominic McEnhill playing in the Down and Connor League for Newhill U16s. He was then spotted by Blackburn Rovers club scout Barry Hunter in late 2007, signing for the Lancashire club in January 2008.

=== Blackburn Rovers ===
The defender spent two years at Rovers and during this time failed to make a competitive appearance for the club. Flynn had two loan spells at Chester City and Accrington Stanley in the 2009–10 season.

=== Ross County ===
Flynn signed for Ross County in the summer of 2010 but only managed to make 23 appearances in his two seasons at Victoria Park, scoring 4 goals. including one that secured County's First Division status in the 2010–11 season against Falkirk, who he would eventually sign for in the summer of 2012.

=== Falkirk ===
Flynn signed for Falkirk from Ross County in the summer of 2012 for a nominal fee. He made his debut for the club in the Challenge Cup against Stirling Albion on 28 July 2012.

Flynn was a first-team regular in his first season at Falkirk, and after a nervy first few games, developed a solid defensive partnership with the vastly experienced club captain Darren Dods. In his second season, with the arrival of Will Vaulks and David McCracken, he found himself more frequently as back-up on the bench. Flynn did however start all four of Falkirk's Scottish Premiership play-off games; he was heavily praised for his performances in these matches, in particular the quarter final second leg 3–1 victory after extra time (4–3 agg.) against Queen of the South on 10 May 2014. Fans were widely impressed and grateful for Flynn's professionalism in the play-off matches, having been on the bench for most of the season and having already agreed a deal to sign for Cliftonville for the following season. Flynn's last appearance in a Falkirk shirt was to be in the play-off semi-final second leg defeat to Hamilton Academical on 18 May 2014.

=== Cliftonville ===
Flynn signed a pre-contract with Cliftonville in March 2014 and will join them for the 2014–15 season. Flynn was also to set up his own football coaching business 'JF Football Fitness' on his return to Northern Ireland.

=== Ballymena, Portadown and Retirement ===
Flynn would have spells with Ballymena and later Portadown, before then retiring mid season due to injury.

== Honours ==
Ross County

- Scottish Challenge Cup: 2010–11
