= 2010 Scottish Cup final =

2010 Scottish Cup Final
- Event: 2009–10 Scottish Cup
Dundee United	Ross County
3	0
- Date: 15 May 2010
- Venue: Hampden Park, Glasgow
- Man of the Match: Craig Conway (Dundee United)
- Referee: Dougie McDonald
- Attendance: 47,122
- Weather: Sunny

The 2010 Scottish Cup Final was the 125th final of Scotland's most prestigious football knockout competition, the Scottish Cup. The match took place on 15 May 2010, at Hampden Park, Glasgow and was contested by first time finalists Ross County and 1994 winners Dundee United. Craig Conway scored a brace as Dundee United ended a wait of 16 years to win the Scottish Cup for the second time in the club's history. The match was the first final since 1938 in which both teams came from outside the Central Belt.

== Background ==
Dundee United had previously reached the Scottish Cup Final eight times, winning only one of them, while Ross County were making their first ever Scottish Cup final. Ross County join the list of lower division sides who have reached the final in the last five years, Gretna in 2006 and Queen of the South in 2008. Dundee United and Ross County had played each other only four times before, with United winning the last three. All of their encounters had been in the League Cup, Ross County won the first game at Victoria Park on 19 August 1998, 2–0 after extra time, their next encounter came almost exactly a year later on 18 August 1999 at Tannadice Park when United won 3–1. Eight years after their last encounter they met again at Tannadice where United got a 2–1 win. They then played each other earlier in the 2009–2010 season with United winning 2–0 at Victoria Park.

== Route to the final ==
=== Ross County ===
Round	Opposition	Score
Third round	Berwick Rangers (h)	5–1
Fourth round	Inverurie Loco Works (h)	4–0
Fifth round	Stirling Albion (h)	9–0
Quarter-final	Hibernian (a)	2–2
Replay	Hibernian (h)	2–1
Semi-final	Celtic (n)	2-0

Ross County entered in the third round, playing their first match against Third Division side Berwick Rangers. In rounds four and five, Ross County scored a total of thirteen goals, first against non-league Inverurie Loco Works, then facing Second Division side Stirling Albion. Their quarter-final match was their first against an SPL side, and they took Hibernian to a replay, which they won with a goal in the 90th minute. In their semi-final at Hampden, they faced Celtic and defeated them 2–0, booking their first appearance in the final of the Scottish Cup.

=== Dundee United ===
Round	Opposition	Score
Fourth round	Partick Thistle (a)	0–2
Fifth round	St Johnstone (a)	0–1
Quarter-final	Rangers (a)	3–3
Quarter-final replay	Rangers (h)	1–0
Semi-final	Raith Rovers (n)	2–0

As a member of the SPL, Dundee United did not enter until the fourth round. Their fourth-round game was against First Division side Partick Thistle and fifth-round game was against SPL side St. Johnstone. In the quarter-final, United took the defending champions Rangers to a replay at Tannadice which they won 1–0. In the semi-final they faced another First Division team in Raith Rovers, who they beat 2–0.

== Ticketing ==
Dundee United sold more than 20,000 tickets for the match up to the end of April and have asked the Scottish Football Association for another 5,000 tickets. Ross County president Roy McGregor expects 20,000 supporters to attend the final, after they sold the initial allocation of 11,000 tickets in just three days. Another batch of 5,000 was received from the SFA and all expect to sell out.

== European qualification ==
The winner automatically qualifies for the play-off round of the 2010–11 UEFA Europa League. Because Dundee United had finished in a Europa League spot in the SPL, Ross County would only have qualified had they won the final. Since Dundee United won, the remaining Europa League spot was allocated to Motherwell, who finished fifth in the SPL.

== Team news and build-up ==
It was confirmed on 11 April 2010, that Dundee United's Paul Dixon would miss the final after he sustained a broken foot in the semi-final win over Raith Rovers. Dundee United's Darren Dods also missed the final after being ruled out with a cartilage injury.

Dundee United manager Peter Houston let former captain Lee Wilkie lead the team out for final. The defender was forced to retire at the age of 29 earlier in the season after being plagued by knee problems.

On 5 May 2010, Ross County announced that they had abandoned plans for a training camp in Spain because of the latest volcanic ash cloud. They were due to fly from Glasgow but, with airport closures and the expected traveller backlog, the club decided to stay in Scotland and prepare for the final.

== Match ==
=== Summary ===
Dundee United dominated the match, but for an hour were unable to make a breakthrough, with interventions from Ross County defender Alex Keddie twice rescuing his side when United had goal scoring opportunities in the first half. United finally scored on 61 minutes when David Goodwillie picked up a clearance from County's Goalkeeper Michael McGovern and lobbed the ball over him and into the goal from 25 yards out. Craig Conway then scored twice in the final quarter of the match to ensure United's second Scottish Cup win.

=== Details ===
15 May 2010
15:00

Dundee United	3–0	Ross County
Goodwillie 61'; Conway 75', 86'	Report

Hampden Park, Glasgow
Attendance: 47,122
Referee: Dougie McDonald

Dundee United	Ross County

GK	1	(Slovakia) Dušan Perniš
RB	2	(Switzerland) Mihael Kovačević		(substituted off) 83'
CB	3	(Scotland) Andy Webster (c)
CB	18	(Scotland) Garry Kenneth
LB	19	(Republic of Ireland) Seán Dillon
RM	14	(Scotland) Danny Swanson		(substituted off) 74'
CM	15	(Ghana) Prince Buaben
CM	16	(Senegal) Morgaro Gomis	Booked
LM	6	(Scotland) Craig Conway
CF	9	(Republic of Ireland) Jon Daly
CF	25	(Scotland) David Goodwillie	Booked		(substituted off) 78'
Substitutes:
GK	13	(England) Steve Banks
DF	27	(Scotland) Keith Watson		(substituted in) 83'
MF	8	(Scotland) Scott Robertson		(substituted in) 74'
MF	12	(Scotland) David Robertson		(substituted in) 78'
FW	10	(England) Danny Cadamarteri
Manager:
(Scotland) Peter Houston

GK	1	(Northern Ireland) Michael McGovern
RB	2	(Scotland) Gary Miller	Booked
CB	5	(Scotland) Scott Boyd
CB	6	(Scotland) Alex Keddie
LB	3	(Scotland) Scott Morrison
RM	7	(Scotland) Michael Gardyne		(substituted off) 77'
CM	4	(Scotland) Jimmy Scott	Booked		(substituted off) 79'
CM	10	(Scotland) Richard Brittain (c)
LM	11	(Scotland) Iain Vigurs
CF	8	(Scotland) Andrew Barrowman
CF	9	(Scotland) Steven Craig		(substituted off) 52'
Substitutes:
GK	18	(Scotland) Joe Malin
DF	14	(Scotland) Stuart Kettlewell
MF	15	(Scotland) Paul Lawson		(substituted in) 52'
FW	12	(Scotland) Paul di Giacomo		(substituted in) 77'
FW	16	(Scotland) Garry Wood		(substituted in) 79'
Manager:
(Scotland) Derek Adams

MATCH OFFICIALS

- Assistant referees:
  - Francis Andrews
- Fourth official:

MATCH RULES

- 90 minutes.
- 30 minutes of extra-time if necessary.
- Penalty shoot-out if scores still level.
- Five named substitutes.
- Maximum of three substitutions.

Match statistics
	Dundee United	Ross County
Goals scored	3	0
Total shots	11	4
Shots on target	7	3
Ball possession	58%	42%
Corner kicks	4	2
Fouls committed	13	18
Yellow cards	2	2
Red cards	0	0
