= 2010–11 Scottish Challenge Cup =

2010–11 ALBA Challenge Cup
Tournament details
- Country: Scotland
- Teams: 30

Final positions
- Champions: Ross County
- Runners-up: Queen of the South

Tournament statistics
- Matches played: 29
- Goals scored: 97 (3.34 per match)

The 2010–11 Scottish Challenge Cup, known as the ALBA Challenge Cup due to sponsorship reasons with MG Alba, was the 20th season of the competition, competed for by all 30 members of the Scottish Football League. The defending champions were Dundee, who defeated Inverness Caledonian Thistle 3–2 in the 2009 final. Dundee were knocked out in the second round after being defeated 4–1 by Stenhousemuir.

The Challenge Cup was won by Ross County, who defeated Queen of the South 2–0 in the final at McDiarmid Park in Perth to win the cup for the second time in their history.

== Schedule ==
Round	First match date	Fixtures	Clubs
First round	Sat/Sun 24/25 July 2010	14	30 → 16
Second round	Tuesday 10 August 2010	8	16 → 8
Quarter-finals	Sat/Sun 4/5 September 2010	4	8 → 4
Semi-finals	Sat/Sun 9/10 October 2010	2	4 → 2
Final	Sunday 10 April 2011	1	2 → 1

== Fixtures and results ==
=== First round ===
The first round draw took place on 27 May 2010.

==== North and East region ====
Forfar Athletic received a random bye to the second round.

24 July 2010	Dundee	2–1	Alloa Athletic	Dens Park, Dundee
15:00	McMenamin 86'; Higgins 90'	Report	Walker 74'	Attendance: 1,522; Referee: Euan Norris

24 July 2010	Dunfermline Athletic	1–0	Arbroath	East End Park, Dunfermline
15:00	Kirk 64'	Report		Attendance: 976; Referee: Bobby Madden

24 July 2010	East Fife	4 – 3 (a.e.t.)	Brechin City	Bayview Stadium, Methil
15:00	Sloan 56' (pen.); Crawford 88'; Eurie 93'; Linn 119'; Bryce (red card) 103'	Report	McAllister 27'; Janczyk 90'; Moyes 101'; Nelson (red card) 55'	Referee: Thomas Robertson

24 July 2010	Elgin City	1–2	Ross County	Borough Briggs, Elgin
15:00	Gunn 82'	Report	Scott 55'; Lawson 62'	Attendance: 855; Referee: Neil Waters

24 July 2010	Peterhead	5–0	Montrose	Balmoor, Peterhead
15:00	Wyness 7', 56'; McNalley 50' (o.g.); Emslie 66'; Bavidge 76'	Report		Attendance: 357; Referee: John Beaton

24 July 2010	Raith Rovers	0–1	Cowdenbeath	Stark's Park, Kirkcaldy
15:00		Report	Armstrong 58'	Attendance: 1,564; Referee: Frank McDermott

24 July 2010	Stirling Albion	0 – 0 (a.e.t.) (3–1 p)	Falkirk	Forthbank Stadium, Stirling
15:00	Devine (penalty scored); Colquhoun (penalty scored); Gibson (penalty missed); Buist (penalty missed); Forsyth (penalty scored)	Report	Millar (penalty missed); Finnigan (penalty missed); O'Brien (penalty scored); Stewart (penalty missed)	Attendance: 1,542; Referee: John McKendrick

Source: Scottish Football League

==== South and West region ====
Berwick Rangers received a random bye to the second round.

24 July 2010	Airdrie United	1–2	Ayr United	New Broomfield, Airdrie
15:00	Muir 51' (pen.)	Report	Trouten 83'; Rodgers 87'	Attendance: 624; Referee: Brian Colvin

24 July 2010	Partick Thistle	2–1	Clyde	Firhill Stadium, Glasgow
15:00	Buchanan 12'; MacBeth 71'	Report	Strachan 31'	Attendance: 1,759; Referee: Steven Nicholls

24 July 2010	Queen of the South	2–1	Albion Rovers	Palmerston Park, Dumfries
15:00	McGuffie 18'; Burns 73'	Report	Donnelly 48'	Attendance: 1,115; Referee: G. Falmond

24 July 2010	Queen's Park	3 – 2 (a.e.t.)	Livingston	Hampden Park, Glasgow
15:00	Eagleshan 40', 96', 103' (pen.)	Report	MacDonald 25'; Sinclair 119'; Bullock (red card) 120'	Attendance: 605; Referee: Kevin Clancy

24 July 2010	Stenhousemuir	3–2	Annan Athletic	Ochilview Park, Stenhousemuir
15:00	Watson 29' (o.g.); Williams 43', 45'	Report	Halsman 89'; Muirhead 90+1'	Attendance: 223; Referee: Steven McLean

24 July 2010	Stranraer	1 – 2 (a.e.t.)	East Stirlingshire	Stair Park, Stranraer
15:00	McColm 78'	Report	Cawley 51'; Richardson 117'	Attendance: 269; Referee: Eddie Smith

25 July 2010	Dumbarton	0 – 0 (a.e.t.) (3–4 p)	Greenock Morton	Strathclyde Homes Stadium, Dumbarton
15:00		Report		Attendance: 1,301; Referee: Stephen Finny

Source: Scottish Football League

=== Second round ===
The second round draw was conducted on 27 July 2010 at Hampden Park.

10 August 2010	Ayr United	2–0	Cowdenbeath	Somerset Park, Ayr
	Campbell 63'; Roberts 73'	Report		Attendance: 556; Referee: Bobby Madden

10 August 2010	Dunfermline Athletic	1 – 1 (a.e.t.) (5–6 p)	Queen of the South	East End Park, Dunfermline
	Kirk 82'	Report	Weatherston 53'	Attendance: 1,160; Referee: John McKendrick

10 August 2010	East Fife	3–1	Stirling Albion	Bayview Stadium, Methil
	Byrne 3'; Johnstone 50'; Cargill 90'	Report	Devine 29'	Attendance: 512; Referee: Matt Northcroft

10 August 2010	Partick Thistle	2–1	Berwick Rangers	Firhill Stadium, Glasgow
	Cairney 40'; Rowson 80'	Report	McLean 28'	Attendance: 931; Referee: Anthony Law

10 August 2010	Peterhead	6–1	East Stirlingshire	Balmoor, Peterhead
	Smith 14'; Hay 54' (o.g.); Bavidge 66'; MacDonald 71', 74'; Gethans 84'	Report	Maguire 38' (pen.)	Attendance: 368; Referee: G. Simpson

10 August 2010	Queen's Park	2 – 3 (a.e.t.)	Forfar Athletic	Hampden Park, Glasgow
	Watt 31'; McBride 70'	Report	Templeman 74'; Deasley 76'; Sellars 94'; Campbell (red card) 84'	Attendance: 404; Referee: E. Smith

10 August 2010	Ross County	3–1	Greenock Morton	Victoria Park, Dingwall
	McKinlay 37' (o.g.); Gardyne 58'; Scott 90'	Report	Kelbie 16'	Attendance: 856; Referee: William Collum

10 August 2010	Stenhousemuir	4–1	Dundee	Ochilview Park, Stenhousemuir
	Williams 9'; Anderson 16'; Quinn 63'; Motion 83'	Report	Griffiths 74'	Attendance: 665; Referee: E. Brines

Source: Scottish Football League

=== Quarter-finals ===
The quarter-final draw was conducted on 12 August 2010 at Hampden Park.

4 September 2010
15:00

Forfar Athletic	0–2	Ross County
Bolochoweckyj (red card) 59'	Report	Lawson 11', 70'; Scott (red card) 56'

Station Park, Forfar
Attendance: 552
Referee: Alan Muir

4 September 2010
15:00

Partick Thistle	2–1	Ayr United
Doolan 3', 33'	Report	Rodgers 36'

Firhill Stadium, Glasgow
Attendance: 1,831
Referee: Stevie O'Reilly

4 September 2010
15:00

Queen of the South	5–0	East Fife
Burns 32', 46', 79'; Ovenstone 64' (o.g.); Harris 90+2'	Report

Palmerston Park, Dumfries
Attendance: 1,751
Referee: Charlie Richmond

5 September 2010
15:00

Peterhead	3–1	Stenhousemuir
Wyness 9', 50'; Gethans 43'	Report	Dalziel 76'

Balmoor, Peterhead
Attendance: 442
Referee: Brian Colvin

=== Semi-finals ===
The semi-final draw was conducted on 9 September 2010 at Hampden Park.

9 October 2010
15:00

Peterhead	1–2	Queen of the South
Bavidge 78'	Report	Reid 66'; Holmes 69'

Balmoor, Peterhead
Attendance: 1,003
Referee: Mike Tumilty

10 October 2010
15:00

Ross County	2 – 2 (a.e.t.) (4 – 3 pen.)	Partick Thistle
Morrison 54'; Barrowman 88'	Report	Kinniburgh 8'; Boyle 64'
Penalties
Brittain (penalty scored); Barrowman (penalty scored); Milne (penalty missed); Scott (penalty missed); Lawson (penalty scored); Craig (penalty scored)	4–3	(penalty scored) Cairney; (penalty missed) Flannigan; (penalty scored) Buchanan; (penalty scored) Erskine; (penalty missed) Boyle; (penalty missed) tbd

Victoria Park, Dingwall
Attendance: 1,307
Referee: Steve Conroy

=== Final ===
10 April 2011
15:00

Queen of the South	0–2	Ross County
	Report	Barrowman 9'; Vigurs 39'

McDiarmid Park, Perth
Attendance: 5,124
Referee: Euan Norris
