= Steven Craig =

Scottish footballer

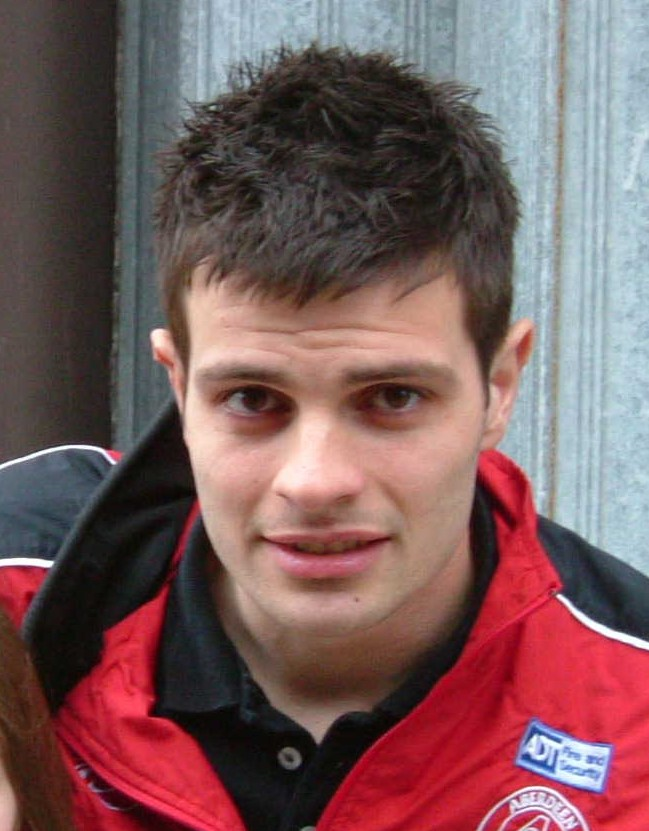
- Craig in 2005

Personal information
- Full name: Steven Craig
- Date of birth: 5 February 1981 (age 45)
- Place of birth: Blackburn, England
- Position: Striker

Team information
- Current team: Gillingham (assistant manager)

Youth career
- Broxburn Athletic
- Raith Rovers

Senior career*
Years	Team	Apps	(Gls)
2000–2003	Falkirk	60	(9)
2003–2004	Motherwell	37	(5)
2004–2005	Aberdeen	17	(2)
2005–2006	→ Dundee (loan)	20	(6)
2006–2008	Livingston	55	(12)
2008–2012	Ross County	99	(21)
2012	→ Partick Thistle (loan)	8	(5)
2013	Partick Thistle	17	(8)
2013–2015	Wycombe Wanderers	58	(6)
2015–2016	Dumbarton	11	(1)
2016	Forfar Athletic	14	(6)
2016–2017	Worcester City	12	(1)
2017	→ Stafford Rangers (loan)	3	(0)
Total		411	(82)
- * Club domestic league appearances and goals

Steven Craig (born 5 February 1981) is a Scottish retired professional footballer who is assistant manager of Gillingham.

Craig has previously played for Falkirk, Motherwell, Aberdeen, Dundee, Livingston, Ross County, Partick Thistle, Wycombe Wanderers and Dumbarton. His father Joe was also a footballer, who played for Partick Thistle and Celtic.

== Early life ==
He was born in Blackburn, Lancashire. His father, Joe Craig, was playing for Blackburn Rovers at the time.

== Career ==
Craig began his career as a youth player at Raith Rovers and after leaving the club in 2000, played one match for junior club Broxburn Athletic He then signed his first professional contract at Scottish First Division club Falkirk, signing initially for three months, but after scoring on his debut on 30 September 2000 against Livingston, he was given a three-year contract.

In January 2003, Craig moved to Scottish Premier League club Motherwell. He made his debut for the club on 29 January 2003 in a 1–0 defeat against Kilmarnock and scored his first goal on 19 February 2003, in a 2–1 win against Dunfermline Athletic. On 5 June 2003, he signed a new one-year contract with the club.

On 12 May 2004, Craig, along with Motherwell team-mate Derek Adams, signed a pre-contract with Aberdeen to join the club on 1 June 2004. He made his debut on the opening day of the 2004–05 season against Rangers. On 24 August 2004, he scored against Berwick Rangers then four days later, scored twice against Livingston in a 2–0 win. These turned out to be his only goals for the club. After falling out of favour with Aberdeen manager Jimmy Calderwood, Craig was allowed to go on trial with Belgian club Sint Truiden and was placed on the transfer list at the end of the season. He also went on trial at Bradford City, At the end of the summer transfer window in August 2005, Craig was released by Aberdeen.

After his release from Aberdeen, Craig had trials at Dunfermline Athletic and Carlisle United. On 15 September 2005, he signed for Dundee. After one season with Dundee, Craig signed for Livingston on 19 June 2006.

Craig signed for Ross County on 6 May 2008. During the 2009–10 season he scored in Ross County's 2–0 victory against Celtic in the Scottish Cup semi–final. He also started in the final, but was on the losing side as Dundee United won 3–0. In the 2010–11 season he scored the winning penalty in the shoot-out as Ross County beat Partick Thistle 4–3 on penalties to reach the Challenge Cup Final. He was an unused substitute in the final as Ross County lifted the trophy, beating Queen of the South 2–0. He was also part of the squad as Ross County won the 2011–12 Scottish First Division and promotion to the top-flight for the first time. At the end of the season, he signed a new one-year contract with the club after turning down a move to Iceland.

Craig left Ross County in August 2012 to sign for Partick Thistle on loan. After being released by Ross County, he then moved to Partick Thistle on a permanent basis on 1 January 2013. Craig won a second successive Scottish First Division winners medal as Partick Thistle won the 2012–13 title, but at the end of the season he was informed by manager Alan Archibald that he would not be offered a new contract by the club.

Craig signed a one-year deal with Wycombe Wanderers on 22 July 2013. On 3 May 2014, he scored Wycombe's second goal in a 3–0 win against Torquay United on the final day of the season, a result which ensured the club avoided relegation from League Two. With Wycombe having secured their place in League Two for another season, Craig signed a contract extension to keep him at the club for another year.

He joined Scottish Championship outfit Dumbarton in July 2015 Making his first start the following week in a 2–1 victory over Hibernian He scored his first goal for the club in a 4–2 defeat against Hibs in October 2015, just two minutes after coming on as a substitute. However, Craig was released after just 6 months with the club.

On 8 February 2016, Craig signed a contract with Forfar Athletic in a deal until the end of the season.

== Coaching career ==
On 10 January 2022 he joined Gala Fairydean Rovers as Assistant Manager to Martin Scott.

On 2 June 2026, Craig joined EFL League Two club Gillingham, appointed as assistant manager to Gareth Ainsworth, who had previously managed Craig at Wycombe Wanderers.

== Career statistics ==
As of 14 January 2016

Club	Season	League		Cup		League Cup		Other^{[A]}		Total	
Club	Season	Apps	Goals	Apps	Goals	Apps	Goals	Apps	Goals	Apps	Goals
Falkirk	2000–01	27	5	2	0	0	0	0	0	29	5
Falkirk	2001–02	29	4	2	0	2	1	2	1	35	6
Falkirk	2002–03	4	0	0	0	0	0	0	0	4	0
Falkirk	Total^{[B]}	60	9	4	0	2	1	2	1	68	11
Motherwell	2002–03	13	2	2	1	0	0	0	0	15	3
Motherwell	2003–04	24	3	0	0	1	1	0	0	25	4
Motherwell	Total	37	5	2	1	1	1	0	0	40	7
Aberdeen	2004–05	14	2	1	0	2	1	0	0	17	3
Aberdeen	2005–06	3	0	0	0	1	0	0	0	4	0
Aberdeen	Total	17	2	1	0	3	1	0	0	21	3
Dundee	2005–06	20	6	3	1	0	0	0	0	23	7
Livingston	2006–07	27	7	2	0	2	2	1	1	32	10
Livingston	2007–08	28	5	4	1	2	1	0	0	34	7
Livingston	Total	55	12	6	1	4	3	1	1	66	17
Ross County	2008–09	31	10	2	0	1	0	2	2	36	12
Ross County	2009–10	24	5	5	4	2	1	2	1	33	11
Ross County	2010–11	18	2	3	1	2	1	1	0	24	4
Ross County	2011–12	26	4	3	1	2	1	1	0	32	6
Ross County	2012–13	0	0	0	0	0	0	0	0	0	0
Ross County	Total^{[C]}	99	21	12	6	6	3	6	3	123	33
Partick Thistle	2012–13	8	5	2	0	0	0	2	2	12	7
Partick Thistle	2012–13	17	8	0	0	0	0	1	0	18	8
Partick Thistle	Total	25	13	2	0	0	0	3	2	30	15
Wycombe Wanderers	2013–14	27	4	3	1	1	0	2	0	33	5
Wycombe Wanderers	2014–15	31	2	1	0	1	0	3	1	36	3
Wycombe Wanderers	Total	58	6	4	1	2	0	5	1	69	8
Dumbarton	2015–16	11	1	1	0	1	0	1	0	14	1
Forfar Athletic	[2015–16]	4	3	0	0	0	0	0	0	4	
Career total		367	75	34	10	18	9	17	8	436	102

A. Other includes Scottish Challenge Cup and Football League Trophy.
B. Falkirk total includes two First Division appearances not recorded on soccerbase. One in 2001–02 and one in 2002–03.
C. Ross County total includes one Scottish Cup and one Scottish Challenge Cup appearance and goal in 2008–09 not recorded on soccerbase.

== Honours ==
Ross County

- Scottish Challenge Cup: 2010–11
- Scottish First Division (second tier): 2011–12

Partick Thistle

- Scottish First Division (second tier): 2012–13
