= Garry Wood =

Scottish footballer

Personal information
- Full name: Garry John Wood
- Date of birth: 27 January 1988 (age 38)
- Place of birth: Aberdeen, Scotland
- Height: 6 ft 3 in (1.91 m)
- Position: Striker

Team information
- Current team: Deveronvale (manager)

Senior career*
Years	Team	Apps	(Gls)
2004–2006	Elgin City	24	(1)
2006–2009	Inverness Caledonian Thistle	18	(2)
2007–2008	→ Montrose (loan)	28	(11)
2009–2011	Ross County	33	(14)
2011–2012	→ Peterhead (loan)	3	(0)
2012–2015	Montrose	105	(23)
2015–2021	Formartine United	141	(70)
2021–2022	Brechin City F.C.	23	(9)
2022–2023	Inverurie Locos		
2023–2024	Banks O' Dee		
2024–	Deveronvale		

Managerial career
- 2024–: Deveronvale
- * Club domestic league appearances and goals as of 7 May 2014

Garry Wood (born 27 January 1988) is a Scottish football manager, and former player, who is the manager of Deveronvale.

He started his career at Elgin City before joining Inverness Caledonian Thistle in 2006. He was promoted from the youth team in the summer of 2007, netting his first goal from the penalty spot in a pre-season friendly, before spending much of the season on loan at Montrose, where he scored seven goals in the Third Division.

Wood made his senior début for Inverness CT in the 2008–09 season. He scored his first senior goal against Arbroath in the League Cup and his first SPL goal against Celtic on 18 October 2008.

He was released by Inverness in the summer of 2009 following their relegation from the SPL, along with Iain Vigurs. They both joined Ross County soon after. Following two seasons at Ross County, Wood was released by the club. In January 2012, he was signed by Montrose.

On 22 May 2015, Wood signed for Formartine United

On 8 May 2024 Garry Wood was announced as the next Deveronvale manager.
