= Iain Vigurs =

Scottish footballer (born 1988)

Personal information
- Full name: Iain Angus Vigurs
- Date of birth: 7 May 1988 (age 38)
- Place of birth: Aberdeen, Scotland
- Height: 5 ft 11 in (1.80 m)
- Position: Midfielder

Youth career
- Aberdeen
- Celtic
- Albion B.C.
- Elgin City

Senior career*
Years	Team	Apps	(Gls)
2003–2006	Elgin City	11	(1)
2006–2009	Inverness Caledonian Thistle	21	(1)
2009–2013	Ross County	133	(17)
2013–2015	Motherwell	47	(6)
2015	Inverurie Loco Works		
2015–2018	Inverness Caledonian Thistle	92	(15)
2018–2021	Ross County	61	(6)
2021–2024	Cove Rangers	51	(3)
2024–2025	Banks o' Dee	0	(0)

International career
2007	Scotland U19	2	(0)
- * Club domestic league appearances and goals as of 1 July 2024

Iain Angus Vigurs (born 7 May 1988) is a former Scottish footballer who played as a midfielder. He has previously played for Elgin City, Inverness Caledonian Thistle, Ross County, Motherwell and Cove Rangers.

== Early life ==
Born in Aberdeen, Scotland, Vigurs’ parents split up when he was two years old and was raised by his mum. His father Scott played as "a winger or a striker and was very fast" and had trials with Chelsea and QPR, but they were unsuccessful. His Mum was very supportive of his ambitions of becoming a professional footballer. His family from both parents side were all football supporters. Vigurs attended Mackie Academy in Stonehaven, where he lived before his footballing career began. His brother, Patrick, is also a footballer.

Vigurs played for Stonehaven Youth under 9s, scoring over 50 goals in his only season before moving to Aberdeen. At 12 years old, he was signed by Celtic. However, Vigurs was let go by the club when he was fourteen. Vigurs reflected on leaving Celtic, saying: "When I left Celtic I felt like I had failed a little bit." Shortly after leaving the club, he was at Albion B.C. before joining Elgin City, his first professional football club.

== Club career ==
=== Elgin City ===
Vigurs played for in the Third Division, Elgin City, making his debut for the club at 15 years old, coming on as a 62nd-minute substitute, in a 3–1 loss against Gretna on 4 December 2004. On 27 December 2004, he made his first professional start of his career, starting the whole game, in a 4–0 loss against Stenhousemuir. Vigurs went on to make four appearances for Elgin City in all competitions at the end of the 2004–05 season.

Vigurs made his first appearance of the 2005–06 season, coming on as a late substitute, in a 3–1 loss against Raith Rovers in the first round of the Scottish Challenge Cup. His first team run ins at Elgin City led to him having an unsuccessful trial at Leeds United. On 12 November 2005, he scored his first goal for the club, in a 2–0 win against Albion Rovers. At the end of the 2005–06 season, Vigurs went on to make ten appearances and scoring once in all competitions. He reflected on playing for Elgin City, saying: "I played for a boys club for a season then went to Elgin when I was 15. I loved every minute and gained some good experience playing in the Third Division."

=== Inverness Caledonian Thistle ===
Vigurs then signed for Inverness Caledonian Thistle, where he was given a twelve-month professional contract. On 1 December 2007, he made his debut for the club, coming on as a late substitute, in a 1–0 win against Dundee United. On 29 April 2008, Vigurs signed a one-year contract extension with Inverness Caledonian Thistle. Five days later on 4 May 2008, he made his home debut for the club, assisting Ross Tokely's goal and then a minute later scored a goal with a volley, in a 6–1 win over Gretna. At the end of the 2007–08 season, Vigurs made four appearances and scoring once in all competitions.

At the start of the 2008–09 season, Vigurs scored his first goal of the season against Arbroath in the second round of the League Cup to a 2–2 draw and then helping Inverness Caledonian Thistle win 4–2 on penalty shootout. However, his first team opportunities were limited under managers Craig Brewster and Terry Butcher and was placed on the substitute bench as a result. In December 2008, the club offered him a new contract following his breakthrough into the first team. On 10 January 2009, he scored his second goal of the season, in a 3–0 win against Partick Thistle in the fourth round of the Scottish Cup. However, Inverness Caledonian Thistle were relegated Scottish Division One. At the end of the 2008–09 season, Vigurs went on to make twenty–one appearances and scoring two times in all competitions.

Following this, it was announced he was among seven players to leave the club. While at Inverness Caledonian Thistle, Vigurs was "criticised for his laid back approach".

=== Ross County ===
Following his release from Inverness, Vigurs joined Highland rivals Ross County on a one-year contract.

Vigurs made his debut for the club in the opening game of the season, in a 2–1 win over Airdrie United. Three weeks later on 29 August 2009, Vigurs scored a back heel against his old club (Inverness Caledonian Thistle) in his first Highland Derby, which Ross County won 3–1. Because of his good performances, he was named SFL Young Player of the Month for August 2009. Since joining the club, he quickly became a first team regular, playing in the midfield position. On 12 December 2009, Vigurs scored his second goal of the season, in a 3–3 draw against Dunfermline Athletic. In the Scottish Cup quarter-final replay against Hibernian, Vigurs provided an assist for Scott Boyd to score a last minute goal in a 2–1 win to advance to the semi–finals. On 3 April 2010, he scored his third goal of the season, in a 2–1 win against Dunfermline Athletic. A week later on 10 April 2010, Vigurs started in Ross County's match against Celtic in the semi–finals of the Scottish Cup and helped the club win 2–0 to reach the final. In the Scottish Cup Final, he started the whole game, in a 3–0 loss against Dundee United. For his performance, newspaper Daily Record said about Vigurs’ performance: "He showed one or two decent touches in and around the United penalty box. Unfortunately for Ross County, Vigurs was forced to make more runs defensively than offensively as United took a grip and didn't let go." At the end of the 2009–10 season, he went on to make forty–eight appearances and scoring three times in all competitions.

After serving a one match suspension, Vigurs returned to the starting line–up, in a 1–0 loss against Falkirk on 14 August 2010. Following his return, he alternated between the starting line–up and substitutes bench. Two weeks later on 25 August 2010 against St Mirren in the second round of the Scottish League Cup, Vigurs came on as a 108th-minute substitute, leading the match to penalty shootout, which he successfully converted the shootout, as Ross County won the shootout to advance to the next round. On 22 September 2010, he scored his first goal of the season, scoring an equaliser, in a 2–1 loss against Dundee United in the last 16 of the Scottish League Cup. After missing two matches, Vigurs scored on his return from a late equaliser, in a 1–1 draw against Queen of the South on 30 October 2010. He then scored his third goal of the season, in a 2–0 win against Stirling Albion on 2 April 2011. Eight days later on 10 April 2011, Vigurs was in the squad for the Scottish Challenge Cup final when he scored the second goal in the match, a 2–0 win against Queen of the South as champions. At the end of the 2010–11 season, Vigurs made forty appearances and scoring four times in all competitions.

After being absent at the start of the 2011–12 season, Vigurs returned to the starting line–up, in a 1–1 draw against Livingston on 17 September 2011. Two weeks later on 1 October 2011, he scored his first goal of the season, in a 4–0 win against Ayr United. Since returning, Vigurs regained his first team place, playing in the midfield position. A month later on 5 November 2011, he scored his second goal of the season from 25 yards shot, in a 1–0 win against Partick Thistle. On 7 January 2012, Vigurs scored twice in a 7–0 win against Stenhousemuir in the fourth round of the Scottish Cup. He scored on 3 March 2012 and 6 March 2012 against Queen of the South and Partick Thistle respectively. A month later on 7 April 2012, Vigurs scored his seventh goal of the season, in a 3–1 win against Livingston. A week later on 14 April 2012, he provided a double assist, in a 3–0 win against Dundee. During the season, Ross County won the Scottish First Division by a record margin of 24 points and promotion to the Scottish Premier League for the first time in the club's history, in a 5–1 win against Hamilton Academical on 28 April 2012. At the end of the 2011–12 season, Vigurs made thirty–five appearances and scoring seven times in all competitions. Following this, he signed a new one-year contract with the club.

With the club playing in the Scottish Premier League, Vigurs played his first top–flight match in three years, as Ross County drew 0–0 against Motherwell in the opening game of the season. Since the start of the 2012–13 season, he continued to regain his first team place, playing in the midfield position. Vigurs scored on 29 September 2012, 5 October 2012 and 20 October 2012 against St Mirren, Inverness Caledonian Thistle and Hibernian respectively. Following his first goal of the 2012–13 season against St Mirren, Vigurs described the match as "It was just a freak match. It ended up turning into a basketball game." On 24 November 2012, he scored his fourth goal of the season, in a 2–1 loss against Dundee United. Vigurs scored in both matches of the Scottish Cup fourth round against Inverness Caledonian Thistle, as the club were eliminated from the tournament. On 2 February 2013, he scored his seventh goal of the season and set up the opening goal of the game, in a 2–2 draw against Hearts. After missing one match, Vigurs scored his seventh goal of the season, in a 3–0 win against Motherwell on 23 February 2013. However, during a match against Kilmarnock on 30 March 2013, he suffered a shoulder injury and was substituted in the 58th minute, as Ross County loss 1–0. But Vigurs recovered and returned to the starting line–up, in a 4–2 loss against Hearts on 6 April 2013. On 5 May 2013, he scored an equalising goal from a free kick, in a 1–1 draw against Celtic. At the end of the 2012–13 season, Vigurs went on to make thirty–nine appearances and scoring nine goals in all competitions.

During his career, Vigurs referred to himself as "Ross County's Mario Balotelli", due to his training-ground eruptions and occasional crazy behaviour.

=== Motherwell ===
With his contract expiring at the end of the 2012–13 season, Vigurs was linked with St Johnstone and Hibernian. He was also linked with a move to English League One side Oldham Athletic, only for the move to collapsed. Vigurs signed a two-year deal with fellow league's rivals Motherwell on 12 June 2013. Upon joining the club, he said he cannot wait to work with manager Stuart McCall and was reunited with his teammate, Paul Lawson, who also joined Motherwell.

Vigurs made his debut for the club, starting the whole game, in a 2–0 loss against Kuban Krasnodar in the first leg of the UEFA Europa League third round. He made his league debut in the opening game of the season, in a 1–0 win over Hibernian. However, Vigurs missed the follow–up match against Kuban Krasnodar, due to suffering from a muscle problems, as Motherwell were eliminated from the tournament after losing 1–0 in the return leg. But he made his return to the starting line–up, in a 3–1 loss against Aberdeen on 11 August 2013. Initially placed on the substitute bench since joining the club, he became a first team regular, playing in the midfield position. Vigurs acknowledged his performance, saying: "I know I can play much better than that and I do feel very self-critical of my performances since the season started. I think I am capable of far more and I'd like to think that as the weeks go on the manager, the players and the supporters will see that. I think I probably need a goal. I seem to sometimes get a goal and then go through a little purple patch." Vigurs also began contributing providing assists at Motherwell but he suffered from goal drought in the first half of the season. In late–November, Vigurs suffered a knee injury that saw him out for one match. But he made his return from injury, starting the whole game, in a 5–0 loss against Celtic on 6 December 2013. On 1 January 2014, Vigurs scored his first goal for the club and set up two goals, in a 4–0 win against St Johnstone. After being out with an injury for weeks in late–January, he returned to the starting line–up, in a 4–3 win against Partick Thistle on 15 February 2014. On 1 March 2014, Vigurs scored his second goal for Motherwell, in a 4–1 win against Hearts. He then scored on 29 March 2014 and 1 April 2014 against Kilmarnock and Inverness Caledonian Thistle. After the match, Vigurs said he was determined to help the club overleap Aberdeen to finish second place. His prediction proved to be correct when Vigurs started the whole game against Aberdeen on the last game of the season and helped Motherwell finish second place in the league. At the end of the 2013–14 season, he went on to make thirty–seven appearances and scoring four times in all competitions.

In his second season at Motherwell, Vigurs started his season well when he set up one of Josh Law's goal, in the UEFA Europa League second qualifying round first leg match against Stjarnan at Fir Park. After missing the first two league matches of the season, Vigurs made his return from injury, coming on as a 73rd-minute substitute, in a 2–0 loss against Inverness Caledonian Thistle on 16 August 2014. After missing one match with ankle injury, he scored on his return, in a 2–1 win against his former club, Ross County on 13 September 2014. After missing another match with an injury, Vigurs returned to the starting line–up and played 56 minutes before being substituted, in a 3–1 loss against Partick Thistle on 4 October 2014. However, his return was short–lived once again when he was dropped from the squad for one match. But Vigurs returned to the starting line–up against St Johnstone on 31 October 2014 and played 88 minutes before being substituted, in a 2–1 loss. In a follow–up match, he scored the only goal of the game, in a 1–0 win against Dundee United. However, Vigurs ended his season with fifteen appearances, scoring twice in all competitions after suffering from a sciatic problem that kept him out for the remainder of the season.

On 2 June 2015, Motherwell announced that Vigurs was amongst the players leaving the club, with his contract having expired.

=== Inverness Caledonian Thistle (second spell) ===
Following his release by Motherwell, Vigurs went on trial at Barnsley. He then played twice as a trialist for Inverurie Loco Works in the Highland Football League. On 12 August 2015, Vigurs signed for Inverness Caledonian Thistle a second time, agreeing a one-year contract. Previously, he received hostile reception by the club's supporters while as a Motherwell player two years ago.

Vigurs made his second debut the same day, as a 64th-minute substitute in a 0–0 draw at home against Partick Thistle on 12 August 2015. After missing two matches with an injury, he returned as a late substitute, in a 2–1 win against Ross County on 3 October 2015. Following his return from injury, Vigurs became involved in the first team, playing in the midfield position. A month later on 7 November 2015, he scored his first goal for Inverness Caley Thistle since 2009, in a 3–1 win against his former club, Motherwell. A month later on 12 December 2015, Vigurs scored twice for the club, in a 2–1 win against Kilmarnock. After missing two matches due to suspension, he returned as a 53rd-minute substitute, in a 2–1 win against Ross County on 2 January 2016. A month later on 15 February 2016, Vigurs scored his fourth goal of the season, in a 2–0 win against Stirling Albion in the fourth round replay of the Scottish Cup. On 15 February 2016, he scored his fifth goal of the season, in a 3–1 win against Aberdeen. On 16 March 2016, Vigurs scored his sixth goal of the season, in a 2–1 loss against Hibernian in the quarter-finals replay of the Scottish Cup. He scored on 2 April 2016 and 9 April 2016 against Motherwell and Dundee United respectively. After serving a two match suspension, he returned to the starting line–up and set up the winning goal, in a 1–0 win against Hamilton Academical on 11 May 2016. At the end of the 2015–16 season, Vigurs went on to make thirty–six appearances and scoring eight times in all competitions. For his performance at Inverness Caledonian Thistle, he signed a two–year contract.

At the start of the 2016–17 season, Vigurs scored a hat–trick and set up the goal, in a 5–1 win against Dunfermline Athletic in the Scottish League Cup group stage. This was followed up by scoring and setting up two goals, in a 7–0 win against Arbroath. He continued to became a first team regular, playing in the midfield position. On 10 September 2016, Vigurs scored his fifth goal of the season, in a 1–1 draw against Aberdeen. After the match, Inverness Caley Thistle manager John Hughes praised his performance, calling it "outstanding". However, the club's performance began to struggle and soon themselves in the relegation zone. After serving a one match suspension, he returned to the first team as a substitute, and had his penalty saved by Wes Foderingham, but Inverness Caley Thistle went on to win 2–1against Rangers on 24 February 2017. However, his return was short–lived when Vigurs suffered a knee injury that saw him out for three matches. But he made his return to the starting line–up, in a 4–2 loss against Motherwell on 15 April 2017. In a follow–up match against Ross County, Vigurs captained the club for the first time, in a 4–0 loss. After being dropped from the squad for one match, he returned to the squad, coming on as a second-half substitute, in a 2–1 loss against Kilmarnock on 13 May 2017. On the last game of the season, Vigurs started the match against Motherwell and despite winning 3–2, Inverness Caledonian Thistle were relegated to the Scottish Championship. At the end of the 2016–17 season, he went on to make thirty–nine appearances and scoring five times in all competitions.

At the start of the 2017–18 season, Vigurs converted the winning penalty in the shootout against Stirling Albion following a 0–0 draw in the group stage of the Scottish League Cup. In his first match as captain against Dunfermline Athletic on 12 August 2017, he scored his first goal of the season, from a free kick, in a 5–1 loss. Two weeks later on 26 August 2017, Vigurs scored a brace, in a 4–0 win against Brechin City. Having continued to remain in the first team, he captained Inverness Caledonian Thistle in a number of matches. Vigurs scored his fourth goal of the season, in a 2–0 win against Dundee United on 21 October 2017. However between November and January, he was suspended on four occasions, including being sent–off twice on 25 November 2017 and 2 January 2018 against St Mirren and Livingston respectively. On 13 January 2018, Vigurs scored his fifth goal of the season, in a 3–1 win against Queen of the South. On 17 March 2018, he scored his sixth goal of the season, in a 1–1 draw against Dundee United. A week later on 24 March 2018, Vigurs started the match in the Scottish Challenge Cup final against Dumbarton and in the last minute of the game, he had his penalty saved before Carl Tremarco scored the winning goal to help the club win 1–0 as champions. He scored on 14 April 2018 and 18 April 2018 in both matches against Dumbarton. After serving a two match suspension, Vigurs returned to the starting line–up, in a 3–0 win against Greenock Morton on the last game of the season. At the end of the 2017–18 season, he made forty–one appearances and scoring eight times in all competitions.

Following this, Vigurs was named the Scottish Championship's PFA Scotland Team of the Year. He also won Inverness Caledonian Thistle's player of the year. On 15 May 2018, however, Vigurs left the club.

=== Ross County (second spell) ===
On 15 May 2018, Vigurs agreed to sign for Ross County again ahead of the 2018–19 season.

Having missed the club's first two matches of the season due to a groin injury, Vigurs made his second debut for Ross County, starting the match as captain, in a 4–1 loss against Arbroath in the group stage of the Scottish League Cup. At the start of the season, he became a first team regular at the club, playing in the midfield position. On 30 October 2018, Vigurs scored his first goal for Ross County since 2013, in a 1–1 draw against Falkirk. However, he suffered a foot injury that saw him out for six months. On 26 April 2019, Vigurs made his return from injury, coming on as a 78th-minute substitute, in a 4–0 win against Queen of the South that saw Ross County won promotion back to the Scottish Premiership in his first season back at the club. On the last game of the season, he scored his second goal of the season, in a 3–2 loss against Falkirk. At the end of the 2018–19 season, Vigurs went on to make nineteen appearances and scoring two times in all competitions.

At the 2019–20 season, Vigurs continued to remain in the first team, playing in the midfield position. However, he suffered a foot injury once again during a match against St Mirren on 14 September 2019 and was out for the rest of the year. On 29 December 2019, Vigurs scored on his return from injury, in a 1–1 draw against St Johnstone. On 1 February 2020, he scored his second goal of the season, in a 3–1 loss against Kilmarnock. Since returning from injury, Vigurs regained his first team place for Ross County. However, the season was curtailed because of the COVID-19 pandemic. By the time the season curtailed ended, he made twenty–two appearances and scoring two times in all competitions. Following this, he signed a one–year contract extension with the club.

Ahead of the 2020–21 season, Vigurs was appointed as the new captain of Ross County. He continued to remain a first team regular for the club, playing in the midfield position. On 19 September 2020, Vigurs scored his first goal of the season, in a 1–0 win against St Johnstone. In a follow–up match against Aberdeen, he was sent–off for a second bookable offence, in a 3–0 loss. After serving a one match suspension, Vigurs returned to the starting line–up, in a 0–0 draw against Hibernian on 17 October 2020. Having previously commented about Celtic's squad advantage, he started the match in the last 16 of the Scottish League Cup match against Celtic on 29 November 2020 and set up a goal, in a 2–0 win to advance to the next round. However, Vigurs suffered ankle injury during a match against Hamilton Academical on 3 February 2021 and was substituted in the 62nd minute. After the match, he was out for a month. On 20 March 2021, he made his return from injury, coming on as a 63rd-minute substitute, in a 1–0 loss against St Johnstone. On the last game of the season, Vigurs scored his second goal of the season, in a 2–1 win against Motherwell. At the end of the 2020–21 season, he went on to make thirty–five appearances and scoring two times in all competitions.

On 27 May 2021, Vigurs was released from Ross County along with nine other players. Vigurs criticized the way in which he and other players were released from the club, criticizing new manager Malky Mackay for not even telling Vigurs he was released himself.

=== Cove Rangers ===
On 23 June 2021, Vigurs, along with teammate Ross Draper, joined newly promoted side Scottish League One side Cove Rangers on a three–year contract. Upon joining the club, he turned down a move to Dunfermline Athletic and wanted to play part–time football.

Vigurs made his Cove Rangers debut, starting the whole game, and set up two goals, in a 3–2 loss against Stirling Albion in the group stage of the Scottish League Cup on 10 July 2021. Since joining the club, he quickly became a first team regular, playing in the midfield position. After missing one match due to illness, Vigurs made his return to the starting line–up, in a 1–1 draw against Montrose on 11 September 2021. Vigurs scored on 27 November 2021 and 4 December 2021 in the league against Queens Park and Dumbarton respectively. However, during a 3–0 win against Alloa Athletic on 18 December 2021, he suffered ankle injury and was substituted in the 17th minute. After missing two matches, Vigurs scored on his return from injury, in a 1–0 win against Clyde on 8 January 2022. However, his return was short–lived when he suffered an injury that saw him out for one match. But Vigurs made his return to the starting line–up, in a 2–2 draw against Dumbarton on 29 January 2022. After missing another one match due to injury, he made his return to the starting line–up, in a 2–0 win against Falkirk on 9 April 2022. On 23 April 2022, Vigurs started the match against Dumbarton and helped the club win 1–0 to seal their promotion to the Scottish Championship. At the end of the 2021–22 season, he went on to make thirty–nine appearances and scoring three times in all competitions.

At the start of the 2022–23 season, Vigurs scored his first goal of the season, in a 2–1 loss against Livingston in the group stage of the Scottish League Cup. However, he found his playing time, coming from the substitute bench. On 15 April 2023, Vigurs scored his second goal of the season, in a 2–1 loss against Inverness Caledonian Thistle. On the last game of the season against Greenock Morton, he started the whole game, in a 1–1 draw, which resulted in Cove Rangers relegated back to Scottish League One. At the end of the 2022–23 season, Vigurs went on to make twenty–five appearances and scoring three times in all competitions.

In the 2023–24 season, Vigurs appeared two times for Cove Rovers, both matches were in Scottish League Cup. On 29 May 2024, he was released by the club, along with Mark Reynolds.

=== Banks o' Dee ===
On 17 July 2024, Vigurs joined Highland League side Banks o' Dee on a free transfer, along with Mark Reynolds. Upon joining the club, Vigurs said "he was effectively retired" but he was tempted to "get back playing".

Vigurs made his debut for Banks o' Dee, in a 2–0 win against Formartine United in the opening game of the season. On 31 August 2024, he scored his first goal for the club, in a 6–1 win against Wick Academy. On 21 September 2024, Vigurs scored his second goal for Banks o' Dee, in a 3–0 win against Clachnacuddi. Two weeks later on 2 October 2024, he scored his third goal for the club, in a 4–2 win against Aberdeen to reach the final of the Aberdeenshire Cup. Four days later on 6 October 2024, Vigurs scored his fourth goal for Banks o' Dee, in a 4–1 win against Strathspey Thistle. He scored on 6 November 2024 and 9 November 2024 against Deveronvale and Nairn County respectively. Vigurs was in the squad for the club, in a 1–0 win against Huntly to win the Aberdeenshire Cup. On 1 February 2025, he scored his seventh goal for Banks o' Dee, in a 2–0 win against Buckie Thistle. A month later on 15 March 2025, Vigurs scored his eighth goal for the club, in a 5–1 win against Rothes. However, he suffered an injury that kept him out for the remaining matches of the 2024–25 season.

On 11 July 2025, Vigurs left the club and have since retired from professional football.

== International career ==
Vigurs has represented Scotland at under-19 level, being first called up in January 2007. He went on to make two appearances for the under–19 side.

== Personal life ==
In June 2009, Vigurs, along with his brother Patrick, was charged "with initiating an alleged racially aggravated street attack". In August 2010, the pair were cleared of committing a racial attack in the incident which took place outside an Aberdeen nightclub.

In May 2013, Vigurs became a first-time father, which was the reason his move to Oldham broke down. In June 2016, he married his long–term girlfriend, Kerry. Together, they have two children.

In the early hours of 3 February 2019, Vigurs was arrested and charged following a violent incident outside Johnny Foxes, a popular pub in Inverness. On 15 August 2019, he was found guilty of assault and fined a total of £1000.

Vigurs studied health and safety qualifications once he retired from professional football.

== Career statistics ==
As of match played 16 May 2021

Appearances and goals by club, season and competition
Club	Season	League			Scottish Cup		League Cup		Other		Total	
Club	Season	Division	Apps	Goals	Apps	Goals	Apps	Goals	Apps	Goals	Apps	Goals
Elgin City	2003–04	Scottish Third Division										
Elgin City	2004–05	Scottish Third Division										
Elgin City	2005–06	Scottish Third Division										
Elgin City	Total		11	1	2	0	0	0	1	0	14	1
Inverness Caledonian Thistle	2007–08	Scottish Premier League	4	1	0	0	0	0	—		4	1
Inverness Caledonian Thistle	2008–09	Scottish Premier League	17	0	1	1	3	1	—		21	2
Inverness Caledonian Thistle	Total		21	1	1	1	3	1	0	0	25	3
Ross County	2009–10	Scottish First Division	35	3	5	0	3	0	4 (Note: Appearances in the Scottish Challenge Cup)	0	47	3
Ross County	2010–11	Scottish First Division	31	2	3	0	3	1	4	1	41	4
Ross County	2011–12	Scottish First Division	30	5	3	2	1	0	1	0	35	7
Ross County	2012–13	Scottish Premier League	37	7	2	2	0	0	–		39	9
Ross County	Total		133	17	13	4	7	1	9	1	162	23
Motherwell	2013–14	Scottish Premiership	36	4	0	0	0	0	1 (Note: Appearances in the Europa League)	0	37	4
Motherwell	2014–15	Scottish Premiership	11	2	1	0	1	0	2	0	15	2
Motherwell	Total		47	6	1	0	1	0	3	0	52	6
Inverness Caledonian Thistle	2015–16	Scottish Premiership	30	6	5	2	1	0	0	0	36	8
Inverness Caledonian Thistle	2016–17	Scottish Premiership	32	1	2	0	5	4	—		39	5
Inverness Caledonian Thistle	2017–18	Scottish Championship	30	8	2	0	4	0	5	0	41	8
Inverness Caledonian Thistle	Total		92	15	9	2	10	4	5	0	116	22
Ross County	2018–19	Scottish Championship	15	2	0	0	3	0	1	0	19	2
Ross County	2019–20	Scottish Premiership	16	2	1	0	5	0	—		22	2
Ross County	2020–21	Scottish Premiership	30	2	1	0	4	0	—		35	2
Ross County	Total		61	6	2	0	12	0	1	0	76	6
Career total			365	45	28	7	34	6	18	1	445	57

== Honours ==
=== Club ===
Ross County

- Scottish First Division: 2011–12,2018–19
- Scottish Challenge Cup: 2010–11, 2018–19

Inverness Caledonian Thistle

- Scottish Challenge Cup: 2017–18

Cove Rangers

- Scottish League One: 2021–22

=== Individual ===
- PFA Scotland Team of the Year (Championship): 2017–18
