= Martin Scott (Scottish footballer) =

Scottish footballer (born 1986)

Personal information
- Date of birth: 15 February 1986 (age 40)
- Place of birth: Livingston, Scotland
- Height: 5 ft 11 in (1.81 m)
- Positions: Midfielder; forward

Team information
- Current team: Berwick Rangers (manager)

Youth career
- 2003–2005: Livingston

Senior career*
Years	Team	Apps	(Gls)
2005–2006	Livingston	19	(0)
2006–2011	Ross County	127	(7)
2011–2013	Hibernian	26	(0)
2012–2013	→ Ross County (loan)	15	(0)
2013–2014	Livingston	32	(4)
2014–2015	Raith Rovers	26	(2)
2015–2016	Salgaocar	6	(0)
2016–2017	Arbroath	26	(9)
2017–2018	Stenhousemuir	24	(3)
2018–2019	Cowdenbeath	13	(1)
2019–2020	Cove Rangers	17	(4)
2020–2021	Brechin City	8	(4)
2021	Forfar Athletic	3	(0)
2021–2023	Gala Fairydean Rovers	8	(1)
Total		350	(35)

International career
2006	Scotland U21	1	(1)

Managerial career
- 2021–2022: Gala Fairydean Rovers (assistant)
- 2022–2026: Gala Fairydean Rovers
- 2026–: Berwick Rangers
- * Club domestic league appearances and goals

Martin "Jimmy" Scott (born 15 February 1986) is a Scottish professional football coach and former player who is currently the manager of Berwick Rangers.

Scott previously played for Livingston, Ross County, Hibernian, Raith Rovers, Arbroath, Stenhousemuir, Cowdenbeath, Cove Rangers, Brechin City, and Forfar Athletic, as well as Indian side Salgaocar.

== Early life ==
He attended The James Young High School in Livingston, West Lothian.

== Playing career ==
=== Livingston ===
Scott came through the youth system at his hometown club Livingston, before making his Scottish Premier League debut on 31 July 2005 in a 3–0 defeat by Rangers at Ibrox. In all he made 22 appearances in all competitions for Livingston before being released in the summer of 2006 after the club's relegation to the Scottish First Division.

=== Ross County ===
Scott then signed for Ross County. He scored the second goal for Ross County in their Scottish Cup semi final victory against Celtic at Hampden Park on 10 April 2010.

=== Hibernian ===
It was reported on 24 January 2011 that Hibernian had agreed a transfer fee of approximately £80,000 with Ross County to sign Scott. The deal was confirmed the next day. Scott was fined by Hibs in July 2011 for punching team-mate Sean Welsh during a training session, which resulted in Welsh needing an operation to repair a fractured cheekbone. He scored his first goals for the club in a 5–0 victory in the League Cup against Berwick Rangers in August 2011. Scott played infrequently under the management of Pat Fenlon, and was made available for loan in March 2012. Scott was loaned back to Ross County for the 2012–13 season.

=== Return to Livingston ===
On 26 July 2013, Scott re-signed for his former club Livingston on a one-year contract. He made his second debut for Livingston the following day in a Scottish Challenge Cup match against Berwick Rangers, before scoring his first goal on 3 August 2013 in a 3–1 win over Elgin City in the Scottish League Cup. On 15 February 2014, Scott scored the second goal in a 3–0 win over Alloa Athletic. The goal, a half volley from over 40 yards out, has had over 250,000 views on YouTube. He left the club in May 2014.

=== Raith Rovers ===
On 2 June 2014, Scott joined Scottish Championship side Raith Rovers On 29 May 2015, it was confirmed that Scott had left the club.

=== Salgaocar ===
Scott joined I-League side Salgaocar.

=== Return to Scotland ===
Scott returned to Scotland in July 2016, signing for Scottish League Two side Arbroath. Scott was released by the Red Lichties at the end of the season, having made thirty-two appearances and scoring ten goals. He subsequently signed for Stenhousemuir in June 2017.

Scott was released by Cowdenbeath and joined Cove Rangers in March 2019. After a spell with Brechin City, Scott joined Forfar Athletic in January 2021.

== Coaching career ==
Gala Fairydean Rovers announced the signing of Scott on June 5, 2021, as a player/coach. Scott took charge of Gala as the club's new manager on 9 January 2022 after Neil Hastings was offered a full-time role in football.

Scott was appointed as manager of Berwick Rangers in September 2026.

== Honours ==
Ross County

- Scottish Challenge Cup: 2006–07

Arbroath

- Scottish League Two: 2016–17

Cove Rangers

- Highland Football League: 2018–19
- Highland League Cup : 2018–19

== Career statistics ==
As of match played 28 October 2017

Appearances and goals by club, season and competition
Club	Season	League		National Cup			League Cup		Other		Total	
Club	Season	Division	Apps	Goals	Apps	Goals	Apps	Goals	Apps	Goals	Apps	Goals
Livingston	2005–06	Premier League	19	0	0	0	2	0	0	0	21	0
Livingston	Total		19	0	0	0	2	0	0	0	21	0
Ross County	2006–07	First Division	28	2	0	0	1	0	2 (Note: Appearances in the Scottish Challenge Cup)	0	31	2
Ross County	2007–08	Second Division	29	3	3	1	2	0	2	0	36	4
Ross County	2008–09	First Division	24	0	2	0	0	0	3	0	29	0
Ross County	2009–10	First Division	30	2	6	1	3	0	2	0	41	3
Ross County	2010–11	First Division	16	0	2	0	2	0	0	0	20	0
Ross County	Total		127	7	14	2	8	0	9	0	158	9
Hibernian	2010–11	Premier League	11	0	0	0	0	0	0	0	11	0
Hibernian	2011–12	Premier League	15	0	1	0	2	2	0	0	18	2
Hibernian	Total		26	0	1	0	2	2	0	0	29	2
Ross County (loan)	2012–13	Premier League	15	0	0	0	1	0	0	0	16	0
Livingston	2013–14	Championship	33	4	1	0	3	1	1	0	38	5
Raith Rovers	2014–15	Championship	26	2	3	0	2	0	1	0	32	2
Salgaocar	2015–16	I-League	9	0	0	0	0	0	0	0	9	0
Arbroath	2016–17	League Two	26	9	2	0	2	0	2	1	32	10
Stenhousemuir	2017–18	League Two	7	0	0	0	2	0	1	0	10	0
Career total			262	13	19	2	20	3	12	0	313	18
