= Michael Gardyne =

Scottish footballer

Personal information
- Date of birth: 23 January 1986 (age 40)
- Place of birth: Dundee, Scotland
- Position: Midfielder

Youth career
- 2004–2006: Celtic

Senior career*
Years	Team	Apps	(Gls)
2006–2007	Celtic	0	(0)
2006–2007	→ Ross County (loan)	32	(6)
2007	Greenock Morton	10	(0)
2008–2012	Ross County	141	(26)
2012–2015	Dundee United	30	(3)
2013–2014	→ Kilmarnock (loan)	23	(1)
2014–2015	→ Ross County (loan)	24	(6)
2014–2021	Ross County	171	(14)
2021–2022	Inverness Caledonian Thistle	11	(5)
2022–2025	Montrose	105	(8)
- * Club domestic league appearances and goals as of 23:05, 29 December 2025

Michael Gardyne (born 23 January 1986) is a Scottish professional footballer who plays as a midfielder. Gardyne previously played for Ross County, Morton, Kilmarnock, Dundee United, Inverness Caledonian Thistle and Montrose.

== Club career ==
Born in Dundee, Gardyne began his career with Celtic, the team he supported as a boy. He signed a professional contract in 2004 and was tipped to be one of the "next crop of youngsters to emerge" but found first-team opportunities limited and spent his first two seasons in the reserve team.

Once credited for performing a 'toilet activity' within a teammate's football boot. Additionally, Gardyne himself confessed to being too focus on making teammates laugh rather than performing top quality skill at training while at Celtic.

Gardyne spent the 2006–07 season on loan to Ross County, scoring on his debut and being part of the side that won the 2006–07 Challenge Cup, scoring the first penalty in the shootout victory against Clyde.

After returning to Celtic, Gardyne left the club permanently and joined Greenock Morton on a free transfer on 31 August 2007, having worked with Morton manager Jim McInally previously in Celtic's youth team. The move lasted just five months, however and Gardyne returned to Ross County in January 2008, going on to help them win the Second Division title that season. Gardyne's form in the 2009–10 season saw him nominated for the Scottish Football League First Division Player of the Year and gain a Scottish Cup runners-up medal. The following season, Gardyne tasted cup success again when County won the Challenge Cup for the second time in three seasons.

Out of contract at the end of the 2011–12 season, Gardyne signed a pre-contract agreement with hometown Scottish Premier League club Dundee United in January 2012, some 18 months after the move was first rumoured. In early August, Gardyne scored on his league debut in the victory against Hibernian, appearing as a late substitute.

In August 2013, Gardyne joined Kilmarnock on loan for 6 months, and in January 2014 it was confirmed that the loan deal had been extended until the end of the season.

On 1 September 2014, Gardyne returned to Ross County, signing on loan until January 2015. He made his first appearance since returning to the club on 13 September 2014, in a 2–1 home defeat against Motherwell. Dundee United announced in April 2015 that Gardyne would be released when his contract expired at the end of the season.

In May 2015, Gardyne signed for Ross County on a permanent basis. Gardyne became Ross County's all-time top goal scorer on 29 December 2015 when he scored twice against Kilmarnock in a 3–2 win which brought him to 60 goals for County. On 13 March 2016, Gardyne scored the opening goal as Ross County won their first major silverware with a 2–1 victory over Hibernian in the Scottish League Cup. Gardyne was released by Ross County on 27 May 2021 along with nine other players and subsequently joined Highland derby rivals Inverness Caledonian Thistle. Gardyne would have his contract with the Caley Jags mutually terminated in January 2022.

Gardyne signed a two-and-a-half-year deal with Montrose in January 2022.

== Club statistics ==
As of match played 6 May 2023

Appearances and goals by club, season and competition
Club	Season	League			Scottish Cup		League Cup		Other		Total	
Club	Season	Division	Apps	Goals	Apps	Goals	Apps	Goals	Apps	Goals	Apps	Goals
Ross County (loan)	2006–07	Scottish First Division	32	6	1	0	2	0	4 (Note: Appearances in the Scottish Challenge Cup)	0	39	6
Morton	2007–08	Scottish First Division	10	0	1	0	0	0	1	0	12	0
Ross County	2007–08	Scottish Second Division	16	4	0	0	0	0	0	0	16	4
Ross County	2008–09	Scottish First Division	27	1	1	0	0	0	2	0	30	1
Ross County	2009–10	Scottish First Division	34	5	7	3	3	2	4	3	48	13
Ross County	2010–11	Scottish First Division	30	3	2	0	1	1	4	1	37	5
Ross County	2011–12	Scottish First Division	34	13	3	4	3	1	1	0	41	18
Ross County	Total		141	26	13	7	7	4	11	4	172	41
Dundee United	2012–13	Scottish Premier League	30	3	4	0	2	0	1 (Note: Appearance in the Europa League)	0	37	3
Dundee United	2013–14	Scottish Premiership	0	0	0	0	0	0	—		0	0
Dundee United	2014–15	Scottish Premiership	0	0	0	0	0	0	—		0	0
Dundee United	Total		30	3	4	0	2	0	1	0	37	3
Kilmarnock (loan)	2013–14	Scottish Premiership	23	1	0	0	0	0	—		23	1
Ross County (loan)	2014–15	Scottish Premiership	24	6	1	0	1	0	—		26	6
Ross County	2015–16	Scottish Premiership	35	5	4	0	4	3	—		43	8
Ross County	2016–17	Scottish Premiership	33	2	1	0	4	0	—		38	2
Ross County	2017–18	Scottish Premiership	33	3	1	0	5	1	—		39	4
Ross County	2018–19	Scottish Championship	25	2	3	1	5	1	2	0	35	4
Ross County	2019–20	Scottish Premiership	14	0	0	0	3	0	—		17	0
Ross County	2020–21	Scottish Premiership	31	2	1	0	3	0	—		35	2
Ross County	Total		171	14	10	1	24	5	2	0	207	20
Inverness Caledonian Thistle	2021–22	Scottish Championship	11	5	0	0	4	0	—		15	5
Montrose	2021–22	Scottish League One	14	3	0	0	0	0	2 (Note: Appearances in the Scottish Championship play-offs)	0	16	3
Montrose	2022–23	Scottish League One	30	3	1	0	0	0	1	1	32	4
Montrose	Total		44	3	1	0	0	0	3	1	48	7
Career total			486	67	31	8	40	9	22	5	578	89

== Honours ==
=== Club ===
Ross County

- Scottish First Division (second tier): 2011–12, 2018–19
- Scottish Second Division (third tier): 2007–08
- Scottish Challenge Cup: 2006–07, 2010–11, 2018–19
- Scottish League Cup: 2015–16

=== Individual ===
- PFA Scotland First Division Team of the Year: 2011–12
- PFA Scotland Team of the Year (Championship): 2018–19
