= 2013–14 Ross County F.C. season =

Ross County
2013–14 season
- Chairman: Roy MacGregor
- Manager: Derek Adams
- Stadium: Victoria Park
- Premiership: Seventh Place
- League Cup: Second Round
- Scottish Cup: Fourth Round
- Top goalscorer: League: Melvin de Leeuw (9); All: Melvin de Leeuw (9)
- Highest home attendance: 5,982 vs. Celtic, Premiership, 9 November 2013
- Lowest home attendance: 2,213 vs. Hibernian, Scottish Cup, 30 November 2013
- Average home league attendance: 3,806
Home colours	Away colours

The 2013–14 season was Ross County's first season in the newly formed Scottish Premiership and their second consecutive season in the top flight of Scottish football. Ross County also competed in the Scottish Cup and the League Cup.

== Summary ==
=== Season ===
Ross County finished seventh in the Scottish Premiership with 40 points. They reached the second round of the League Cup, losing to Stranraer, and the fourth round of the Scottish Cup, losing to Hibernian.

== Results and fixtures ==
Win Draw Loss Postponed

=== Pre season / Friendlies ===
20 July 2013 Friendly	Ross County	2 – 2	Manchester United XI	Victoria Park
	Luckassen 5'; Cooper 57'	Report	Petrucci 35'; Tunnicliffe 64'

23 July 2013 Friendly	Den Bosch	1 – 0	Ross County	Amsterdam
16:00	Zeldenrust 87'	Report	Brittain (red card) 79'

26 July 2013 Friendly	PEC Zwolle	5 – 1	Ross County	MAC³PARK Stadion, Amsterdam
16:00	Benson 21'; Saymak 27'; Fernandez 55' 62'; Nijland 76'	Report	Sproule 26'

=== Scottish Premiership ===
3 August 2013 1	Celtic	2 – 1	Ross County	Celtic Park
15:00	Stokes 28', 87'	BBC	Maatsen 3'	Attendance: 45,705; Referee: Willie Collum

10 August 2013 2	Ross County	1 – 3	Partick Thistle	Victoria Park
17:15	Carey 71'	BBC	Doolan 18'; Lawless 52', 59'	Attendance: 3,331; Referee: Alan Muir

17 August 2013 3	St. Johnstone	4 – 0	Ross County	McDiarmid Park
15:00	Hasselbaink 14'; Wotherspoon 18'; May 50'; MacKay 62'	BBC		Attendance: 2,833; Referee: Brian Colvin

24 August 2013 4	Ross County	3 – 0	St. Mirren	Victoria Park
15:00	Kettlewell 9'; Brittain 24' 57'	BBC		Attendance: 3,142; Referee: Calum Murray

31 August 2013 5	Hibernian	0 – 0	Ross County	Easter Road
15:00		BBC		Attendance: 9,569; Referee: Iain Brines

15 September 2013 6	Ross County	2 – 4	Dundee United	Victoria Park
12:45	Sproule 72'; Quinn 76'	BBC	Mackay-Steven 18' (pen.); Armstrong 20'; Gauld 40'; Çiftçi 65'	Attendance: 3,005; Referee: Brian Colvin

21 September 2013 7	Ross County	2 – 1	Heart of Midlothian	Victoria Park
15:00	de Leeuw 89'; Brittain 90'	BBC	Paterson 24'	Attendance: 4,059; Referee: Euan Norris

28 September 2013 8	Motherwell	3 – 1	Ross County	Fir Park
15:00	Sutton 54' 68'; McHugh 77'	Report	de Leeuw 30'	Attendance: 4,263; Referee: Bobby Madden

5 October 2013 9	Ross County	1 – 0	Aberdeen	Victoria Park
15:00	Quinn 52'	BBC		Attendance: 5,290; Referee: Crawford Allan

19 October 2013 10	Kilmarnock	2 – 0	Ross County	Rugby Park
15:00	Boyd 17'; Irvine 70'	BBC		Attendance: 3,5,82; Referee: Stephen Finnie

9 November 2013 11	Ross County	1 – 4	Celtic	Victoria Park
12:45	Sproule 68'	BBC	Van Dijk 41' 53'; Ledley 70' 73'	Attendance: 5,982; Referee: Kevin Clancy

17 November 2013 12	St Mirren	2 – 1	Ross County	St Mirren Park
15:00	McLean 35'; Newton 51'	BBC	Saunders 67'	Attendance: 4,205; Referee: Willie Collum

23 November 2013 13	Heart of Midlothian	2 – 2	Ross County	Tynecastle Park
15:00	Paterson 28'; Stevenson 89'	BBC	Carey 23' de Leeuw 50'	Attendance: 12,508; Referee: Crawford Allan

7 December 2013 14	Ross County	1 – 2	Kilmarnock	Victoria Park
15:00	Kettlewell 33'	BBC	Johnston 7'; Boyd 43'	Attendance: 2,937; Referee: Bobby Madden

14 December 2013 15	Ross County	1 – 2	Motherwell	Victoria Park
15:00	de Leeuw 62'	BBC	Sutton 15' 17'	Attendance: 2,792; Referee: Crawford Allan

21 December 2013 16	Dundee United	1 – 0	Ross County	Tannadice Park
15:00	Mackay-Steven 69'	BBC		Attendance: 8,029; Referee: Iain Brines

26 December 2013 17	Ross County	0 – 2	Hibernian	Victoria Park
15:00		BBC	Nelson 18'; Forster 56'	Attendance: 3,383; Referee: Brian Colvin

29 December 2013 18	Aberdeen	1 – 0	Ross County	Pittodrie Stadium
15:00	Low 2'	BBC Sport		Attendance: 11,602; Referee: Calum Murray

1 January 2014 19	Inverness Caledonian Thistle	1 – 2	Ross County	Caledonian Stadium
15.00	Doran 89'	BBC	Boyd 15'; Cooper 17'	Attendance: 4,332; Referee: Alan Muir

4 January 2014 20	Ross County	1 – 0	St. Johnstone	Victoria Park
15:00	Carey 88'	BBC		Attendance: 3,305; Referee: Euan Norris

11 January 2014 21	Partick Thistle	3 – 3	Ross County	Firhill Stadium
15:00	Taylor 28' 39'; Lawless 47'	BBC	Kiss 23' 76'; Gordon 50'; Kettlewell (red card) 84'	Attendance: 3,539; Referee: Bobby Madden

18 January 2014 22	Ross County	3 – 0	Dundee United	Victoria Park
15:00	Kiss 42' 74'; Arquin 69'	BBC Sport		Attendance: 3,609; Referee: Craig Charleston

25 January 2015 23	Ross County	1 – 2	Heart of Midlothian	Victoria Park
15:00	Songo'o 45'	BBC	Paterson 37'; Robinson 80'	Attendance: 4,016; Referee: Kevin Clancy

1 February 2014 24	Kilmarnock	2 – 2	Ross County	Rugby Park
15:00	Boyd 47' 90'	BBC	Arquin 30'; Songo'o 36'; Kiss (red card) 76'	Attendance: 3,372; Referee: Crawford Allan

15 February 2014 25	Hibernian	2 – 1	Ross County	Easter Road
15:00	Stanton 10'; Taiwo 24'	BBC	Brittain 59'	Attendance: 8,411; Referee: Bobby Madden

22 February 2014 26	Ross County	2 – 1	St. Mirren	Victoria Park
15:00	Arquin 38' de Leeuw 83'	BBC	McGinn 66'	Attendance: 3,394; Referee: Willie Collum

25 February 2014 27	Ross County	0 – 3	Inverness Caledonian Thistle	Victoria Park
19:45		BBC	Raven 8'; McKay 40'; Watkins 78'	Attendance: 4,805; Referee: Calum Murray

1 March 2014 28	Ross County	1 – 1	Partick Thistle	Victoria Park
15:00	Brittain 14'	BBC	Higginbotham 9'	Attendance: 3,441; Referee: Craig Thomson

15 March 2014 29	St. Johnstone	0 – 1	Ross County	McDiarmid Park
15:00		BBC	de Leeuw 29'	Attendance: 2,213; Referee: Bobby Madden

22 March 2014 30	Motherwell	2 – 1	Ross County	Fir Park
15:00	McFadden 47'; Sutton 60'	BBC	Songo'o 82'	Attendance: 4,080; Referee: Iain Brines

25 March 2014 31	Ross County	1 – 1	Aberdeen	Victoria Park
19:45	de Leeuw 35'	BBC	Rooney 77'	Attendance: 3,775; Referee: Brian Colvin

29 March 2014 32	Celtic	1 – 1	Ross County	Celtic Park
15:00	Commons 35'	BBC	de Leeuw 16'	Attendance: 49,270; Referee: John Beaton

4 April 2014 33	Ross County	1 – 2	Inverness Caledonian Thistle	Victoria Park
19:45	Kiss 49'	BBC	Doran 45'; McKay 79'	Attendance: 4,433; Referee: Calum Murray

19 April 2014 34	Heart of Midlothian	2 – 0	Ross County	Tynecastle Park
15:00	Hamill 65' (pen.) (red card) 70'; Carrick 90'	BBC		Attendance: 13,692; Referee: Willie Collum

26 April 2014 35	Ross County	2 – 1	Kilmarnock	Victoria Park
15:00	Kiss 41'; Brittain 77' (pen.)	BBC	Boyd 88'	Attendance: 3,401; Referee: Kevin Clancy

3 May 2014 36	St Mirren	1 – 0	Ross County	St Mirren Park
15:00	Wylde 79'	BBC		Attendance: 4,414; Referee: Craig Thomson

6 May 2014 37	Ross County	1 – 0	Hibernian	Victoria Park
19:45	Brittain 77' (pen.)	BBC		Attendance: 3,850; Referee: John Beaton

10 May 2014 38	Partick Thistle	2 – 3	Ross County	Firhill Stadium
15:00	Taylor 51'; Moncur 73'	BBC	Slew 22'; Arquin 48' de Leeuw 77'	Attendance: 4,390; Referee: Bobby Madden

=== Scottish League Cup ===
27 August 2013 Second Round	Stranraer	3 – 2	Ross County	Stair Park
19:45	Winter 65'; Aitken 65' (pen.); Grehan 82'	BBC	Brittain 45' (pen.); Mustafi 79'	Attendance: 215

=== Scottish Cup ===
30 November 2013 Fourth Round	Ross County	0 – 1	Hibernian	Victoria Park
15:00		BBC	Handling 31'	Attendance: 2,213

== Squad statistics ==
=== Appearances ===
As of 11 May 2014

No.	Pos	Nat	Player	Total		Premiership		League Cup		Scottish Cup	
No.	Pos	Nat	Player	Apps	Goals	Apps	Goals	Apps	Goals	Apps	Goals
1	GK	(Scotland) SCO	Mark Brown	30	0	28+0	0	1+0	0	1+0	0
2	DF	(Slovakia) SVK	Erik Čikoš	14	0	14+0	0	0+0	0	0+0	0
3	DF	(England) ENG	Ben Gordon	29	1	25+3	1	0+0	0	1+0	0
4	MF	(Scotland) SCO	Stuart Kettlewell	27	2	22+3	2	1+0	0	1+0	0
5	DF	(Scotland) SCO	Scott Boyd	29	1	27+1	1	0+0	0	1+0	0
7	MF	(Slovakia) SVK	Filip Kiss	17	6	17+0	6	0+0	0	0+0	0
8	MF	(Scotland) SCO	Richard Brittain	36	8	34+0	7	1+0	1	1+0	0
10	MF	(Scotland) SCO	Rocco Quinn	31	2	20+9	2	1+0	0	1+0	0
11	FW	(Netherlands) NED	Melvin de Leeuw	35	9	19+14	9	0+1	0	1+0	0
12	MF	(Scotland) SCO	Michael Tidser	16	0	15+1	0	0+0	0	0+0	0
14	MF	(Netherlands) NED	Darren Maatsen	12	1	2+8	1	0+1	0	0+1	0
15	FW	(Scotland) SCO	Gary Glen	16	0	4+11	0	0+0	0	1+0	0
16	MF	(Scotland) SCO	Alex Cooper	17	1	5+12	1	0+0	0	0+0	0
18	MF	(Netherlands) NED	Marc Klok	6	0	4+2	0	0+0	0	0+0	0
20	GK	(Scotland) SCO	Michael Fraser	10	0	10+0	0	0+0	0	0+0	0
21	DF	(Northern Ireland) NIR	Brian McLean	28	0	25+1	0	1+0	0	1+0	0
22	DF	(Scotland) SCO	Steven Saunders	13	1	4+8	1	0+0	0	0+1	0
23	MF	(Republic of Ireland) IRL	Graham Carey	38	3	31+5	3	1+0	0	1+0	0
24	MF	(Scotland) SCO	Tony Dingwall	0	0	0+0	0	0+0	0	0+0	0
25	FW	(England) ENG	Jordan Slew	20	1	17+3	1	0+0	0	0+0	0
26	DF	(Greece) GRE	Vangelis Oikonomou	15	0	15+0	0	0+0	0	0+0	0
27	FW	(Martinique) MTQ	Yoann Arquin	16	4	14+2	4	0+0	0	0+0	0
28	DF	(Cameroon) CMR	Yann Songo'o	17	3	17+0	3	0+0	0	0+0	0
42	GK	(Scotland) SCO	Sean McCarthy	0	0	0+0	0	0+0	0	0+0	0
Players who left the club during the 2013–14 season
2	DF	(Switzerland) SUI	Mihael Kovačević	15	0	13+0	0	1+0	0	0+1	0
6	DF	(Switzerland) SUI	Branislav Mićić	10	0	8+1	0	0+0	0	1+0	0
7	MF	(Northern Ireland) NIR	Ivan Sproule	11	2	7+3	2	1+0	0	0+0	0
9	FW	(Switzerland) SUI	Orhan Mustafi	8	1	2+5	0	0+1	1	0+0	0
12	DF	(Scotland) SCO	Grant Munro	7	0	5+1	0	1+0	0	0+0	0
17	FW	(Scotland) SCO	Steven Ross	10	0	5+5	0	0+0	0	0+0	0
19	FW	(Netherlands) NED	Kevin Luckassen	16	0	9+5	0	1+0	0	1+0	0

== Team statistics ==
=== League table ===
Pos	Team	Pld	W	D	L	GF	GA	GD	Pts	Qualification or relegation
5	Inverness Caledonian Thistle	38	16	9	13	44	44	0	57	
6	St Johnstone	38	15	8	15	48	42	+6	53	Qualification for the Europa League second qualifying round (Note: St Johnstone, as winners of the 2013–14 Scottish Cup, qualified for the Europa League second qualifying round.)
7	Ross County	38	11	7	20	44	62	−18	40	
8	St Mirren	38	10	9	19	39	58	−19	39	
9	Kilmarnock	38	11	6	21	45	66	−21	39	

Source: SPFL Archive
Rules for classification: 1) points; 2) goal difference; 3) number of goals scored.

=== Division summary ===
Round	1	2	3	4	5	6	7	8	9	10	11	12	13	14	15	16	17	18	19	20	21	22	23	24	25	26	27	28	29	30	31	32	33	34	35	36	37	38
Ground	A	H	A	H	A	H	H	A	H	A	H	A	A	H	H	A	H	A	A	H	A	H	H	A	A	H	H	H	A	A	H	A	H	A	H	A	H	A
Result	L	L	L	W	D	L	W	L	W	L	L	L	D	L	L	L	L	L	W	W	D	W	L	D	L	W	L	D	W	L	D	D	L	L	W	L	W	W
Position	9	10	11	9	9	9	9	9	9	9	9	10	10	10	11	11	11	11	11	11	11	11	10	11	11	11	10	11	9	9	9	9	9	11	10	10	9	7

A = Away; H = Home; W = Win; D = Draw; L = Loss

== Transfers ==
=== Players in ===
Player	From	Fee
(Netherlands) Melvin de Leeuw	(Netherlands) SC Cambuur	Free
(Netherlands) Darren Maatsen	(Netherlands) Excelsior	Free
(Netherlands) Kevin Luckassen	(Netherlands) AZ Alkmaar	Free
(Netherlands) Marc Klok	(Netherlands) FC Utrecht	Free
(England) Ben Gordon	(England) Yeovil Town	Free
(Scotland) Steven Saunders	(Scotland) Motherwell	Free
(Northern Ireland) Brian McLean	(Scotland) Dundee United	Free
(Republic of Ireland) Graham Carey	(Scotland) St Mirren	Free
(Switzerland) Orhan Mustafi	(Switzerland) Grasshopper	Loan
(England) Jordan Slew	(England) Blackburn Rovers	Loan
(Scotland) Michael Tidser	(England) Rotherham United	Loan
(Greece) Vangelis Oikonomou	Free Agent	Free
(Slovakia) Filip Kiss	(Wales) Cardiff City	Loan
(Martinique) Yoann Arquin	(England) Notts County	Free
(Cameroon) Yann Songo'o	(England) Blackburn Rovers	Loan
(Slovakia) Erik Čikoš	(Slovakia) Slovan Bratislava	Loan

=== Players out ===
Player	To	Fee
(Scotland) Paul Lawson	(Scotland) Motherwell	Free
(Scotland) Paul Gallagher	(Scotland) Partick Thistle	Free
(Germany) Steffen Wohlfarth	(Germany) FV Ravensburg	Free
(Scotland) Iain Vigurs	(Scotland) Motherwell	Free
(Northern Ireland) Sam Morrow	Free Agent	Released
(Scotland) Mark Corcoran	(Scotland) Stranraer	Free
(Canada) Andre Hainault	(Germany) VfR Aalen	Free
(Scotland) Marc Fitzpatrick	(Scotland) Greenock Morton	Free
(Scotland) Mark Fotheringham	(England) Notts County	Free
(Scotland) Martin Scott	(Scotland) Livingston	Free
(Greece) Vangelis Oikonomou	(Greece) Veria	Free
(Scotland) Grant Munro	(Scotland) Brora Rangers	Free
(Northern Ireland) Ivan Sproule	(Northern Ireland) Linfield	Free
(Scotland) Steven Ross	(Scotland) Brora Rangers	Loan
(Switzerland) Mihael Kovačević	Free Agent	Released
(Switzerland) Branislav Mićić	Free Agent	Released
(Netherlands) Kevin Luckassen	(Czech Republic) Slovan Liberec	Undisclosed
