= 2012–13 Ross County F.C. season =

Ross County
2012–13 season
- Chairman: Roy MacGregor
- Manager: Derek Adams
- Stadium: Victoria Park
- Premier League: Fifth place
- League Cup: Second round
- Scottish Cup: Fourth round
- Top goalscorer: League: Richard Brittain (9); All: Richard Brittain (10)
- Highest home attendance: 6,110 vs Celtic, 18 August 2012
- Lowest home attendance: 2,837 vs St Mirren, 27 November 2012
- Average home league attendance: League: 4,429
Home colours	Away colours

The 2012–13 season was Ross County's first season in the Scottish Premier League, having been promoted as champions of the Scottish First Division at the end of 2011–12 season. They also competed in the League Cup and the Scottish Cup.

== Summary ==
=== Season ===
During season 2012–13 Ross County finished fifth in the Scottish Premier League. They reached the second round of the League Cup and the fourth round of the Scottish Cup.

== Results and fixtures ==
Win Draw Loss Postponed

=== Preseason ===
4 July 2012 Friendly	Brora Rangers	1 – 3	Ross County	Dudgeon Park
19:30	Baxter 36'	Report	Kettlewell 14'; Brittain 25'; Morrow 38'	Referee: Ross

7 July 2012 Friendly	Turriff United	0 – 1	Ross County	The Haughs
15:00		Report	McMenamin 22'

10 July 2012 Friendly	Raith Rovers	1 – 1	Ross County	Stark's Park
19:30	Graham 16'	Raith Rovers Report	Morrow 8'

14 July 2012 Friendly	Clachnacuddin	0 – 3	Ross County	Grant Street Park
15:00		Report	Scott 5'; Byrne 7'; McMenamin

17 July 2012 Friendly	Nairn County	0 – 0	Ross County	Station Park
19:45		Report

18 July 2012 Friendly	Ross County	1 – 0	Coventry City	Grant Street Park
19:30	Craig 85'	Report

21 July 2012 Friendly	Elgin City	1 – 4	Ross County	Borough Briggs
19:30	Gunn 37'	Record Report; Report	Boyd 8'; Glen 20'; McMenamin 25'; Duffy 39' (Own goal)	Attendance: 516

21 July 2012 Friendly	Fort William	1 – 6	Ross County	Claggan park
	Browettt	Report	Byrne; Cooper; Dingwall

27 July 2012 Friendly	FC Den Bosch	2 – 1	Ross County	De Vliert
19:00 (Local Time)			McMenamin

=== Scottish Premier League ===
4 August 2012 Scottish Premier League	Ross County	0 – 0	Motherwell	Victoria Park
15:00		BBC Report		Attendance: 4,828; Referee: Muir

11 August 2012 Scottish Premier League	Aberdeen	0 – 0	Ross County	Pittodrie Stadium
15:00		BBC Report		Attendance: 14,010; Referee: Norris

18 August 2012 Scottish Premier League	Ross County	1 – 1	Celtic	Victoria Park
12:15	Brittain 49'	BBC Report	Commons 90+3'	Attendance: 6,110; Referee: Thomson

25 August 2012 Scottish Premier League	Dundee	0 – 1	Ross County	Dens Park
15:00		BBC Report	Brittain 72' (Penalty)	Attendance: 4,905; Referee: McLean

1 September 2012 Scottish Premier League	Ross County	0 – 0	Kilmarnock	Victoria Park
15:00		BBC Report		Attendance: 4,006; Referee: Beaton

14 September 2012 Scottish Premier League	Dundee United	0 – 0	Ross County	Tannadice
19:45		BBC Report		Attendance: 6,892; Referee: Collum

22 September 2012 Scottish Premier League	Ross County	1 – 2	St Johnstone	Victoria Park
15:00	Morrow 68'	BBC Report	Craig 30'; Vine (red card) 30'; Wright 86'	Attendance: 4,094; Referee: Allan

29 September 2012 Scottish Premier League	St Mirren	5 – 4	Ross County	St Mirren Park
15:00	Thompson 39', 89'; Guy 54' (Penalty); Parkin 59'; McLean 64'	BBC Report	Vigurs 11'; Munro 45'; Quinn 79', 80'	Attendance: 3,706; Referee: Mclean

5 October 2012 Scottish Premier League	Inverness Caledonian Thistle	3 – 1	Ross County	Caledonian Stadium
19:45	Draper 9'; Shinnie 28'; Doran 87'	BBC Report	Vigurs 48'	Attendance: 6,766; Referee: Brines

20 October 2012 Scottish Premier League	Ross County	3 – 2	Hibernian	Victoria Park
15:00	Kettlewell 9'; Vigurs 34'; McMenamin 83'	BBC Report	Griffiths 6'; McPake 45'	Attendance: 4,070; Referee: McLean

27 October 2012 Scottish Premier League	Heart of Midlothian	2 – 2	Ross County	Tynecastle Stadium
15:00	Novikovas 40'; Sutton 90+3'	BBC Report	Brittain 55' (pen.); Kettlewell 77'	Attendance: 12,139; Referee: Charleston

3 November 2012 Scottish Premier League	Ross County	2 – 1	Aberdeen	Victoria Park
15:00	Reynolds 37' (o.g.); Ross 49'	BBC Report	McGinn 77'	Attendance: 6,064; Referee: Thomson

10 November 2012 Scottish Premier League	Kilmarnock	3 – 0	Ross County	Rugby Park
15:00	Heffernan 66', 82'; Harkins 77'	BBC Report		Attendance: 4,012; Referee: Madden

17 November 2012 Scottish Premier League	St Johnstone	1 – 1	Ross County	McDiarmid Park
15:00	Mackay 51'	BBC Report	Craig 70' (Own goal)	Attendance: 3,037; Referee: Collum

24 November 2012 Scottish Premier League	Ross County	1 – 2	Dundee United	Victoria Park
15:00	Vigurs 49'	BBC Report	Russell 52'; Armstrong 64'	Attendance: 3,930; Referee: Brines

27 November 2012 Scottish Premier League	Ross County	0 – 0	St Mirren	Victoria Park
19:45		BBC Report		Attendance: 2,837; Referee: McLean

8 December 2012 Scottish Premier League	Motherwell	3 – 2	Ross County	Fir Park
15:00	Higdon 25'; Law 46'; Lasley 82'	BBC Report	Quinn 17', 70'	Attendance: 3,739; Referee: Murray

15 December 2012 Scottish Premier League	Ross County	1 – 1	Dundee	Victoria Park
15:00	Glen 74'	BBC Report	Davidson 37'	Attendance: 3,129; Referee: Muir

22 December 2012 Scottish Premier League	Celtic	4 – 0	Ross County	Celtic Park
15:00	Brown 46'; Hooper 53', 64'; Forrest 70'	BBC Report		Attendance: 49,428; Referee: Norris

26 December 2012 Scottish Premier League	Hibernian	0 – 1	Ross County	Easter Road
15:00		BBC Report	Brittain 57'	Attendance: 8,980; Referee: Beaton

29 December 2012 Scottish Premier League	Ross County	P – P	Heart of Midlothian	Victoria Park
15:00		BBC Report
Note: Postponed due to waterlogged pitch

2 January 2013 Scottish Premier League	Ross County	P – P	Inverness Caledonian Thistle	Victoria Park
15:05		BBC Report
Note: Postponed due to waterlogged pitch

19 January 2013 Scottish Premier League	St Mirren	1 – 4	Ross County	St Mirren Park
12:45	Thompson 50'	BBC Report	Brittain 22'; Morrow 67'; Sproule 71', 74'	Attendance: 3,802; Referee: Norris

26 January 2013 Scottish Premier League	Dundee United	1 – 1	Ross County	Tannadice Park
15:00	Mackay-Steven 52'	BBC Report	Brittain 82'	Attendance: 5,117; Referee: Brines

30 January 2013 Scottish Premier League	Ross County	1 – 0	Hibernian	Victoria Park
19:45	Sproule 36'	BBC Report		Attendance: 3,055; Referee: Madden

2 February 2013 Scottish Premier League	Ross County	2 – 2	Heart of Midlothian	Victoria Park
15:00	Quinn 20'; Vigurs 90+2'	BBC Report	Ngoo 31'; Walker 63'	Attendance: 3,903; Referee: Finnie

8 February 2013 Scottish Premier League	Dundee	0 – 2	Ross County	Dens Park
19:45		BBC Report	Lawson 80'; Glen 90+3'	Attendance: 4,726; Referee: McKendrick

16 February 2013 Scottish Premier League	Ross County	1 – 0	St Johnstone	Victoria Park
15:00	Sproule 11'	BBC Report		Attendance: 3,516; Referee: Beaton

23 February 2013 Scottish Premier League	Ross County	3 – 0	Motherwell	Victoria Park
15:00	Sproule 34'; Brittain 71'; Vigurs 89'	BBC Report		Attendance: 3,797; Referee: Collum

26 February 2013 Scottish Premier League	Aberdeen	0 – 1	Ross County	Pittodrie Stadium
19:45		BBC Report	Glen 81'	Attendance: 6,394; Referee: Allan

2 March 2013 Scottish Premier League	Ross County	0 – 0	Inverness Caledonian Thistle	Victoria Park
15:00		BBC Report		Attendance: 5,959; Referee: McLean

9 March 2013 Scottish Premier League	Ross County	3 – 2	Celtic	Victoria Park
15:00	Munro 30'; Morrow 36'; Wohlfarth 90+1'	BBC Report	Mulgrew 15'; Hooper 21'	Attendance: 6,031; Referee: Collum

16 March 2013 Scottish Premier League	Inverness Caledonian Thistle	2 – 1	Ross County	Caledonian Stadium
15:00	Shinnie 5'; McKay 59' (Penalty)	BBC Report	Lawson 35'	Attendance: 5,750; Referee: Brines

30 March 2013 Scottish Premier League	Ross County	0 – 1	Kilmarnock	Victoria Park
15:00		BBC Report	Fowler 2'	Attendance: 3,782; Referee: Norris

6 April 2013 Scottish Premier League	Heart of Midlothian	4 – 2	Ross County	Tynecastle Stadium
12:00	Ngoo 49', 84'; Holt 79'; Ikonomou 80' (Own goal)	BBC Report	Wohlfarth 22', 54'	Attendance: 10,456; Referee: Muir

21 April 2013 Scottish Premier League	St Johnstone	2 – 2	Ross County	McDiarmid Park
16:00	MacLean 6'; Davidson 25'	BBC Report	Brittain 15' (Penalty), 76' (Penalty)	Attendance: 2,444; Referee: Collum

26 April 2013 Scottish Premier League	Ross County	1 – 0	Dundee United	Victoria Park
19:35	Sproule 54'	BBC Report	Douglas (red card) 65'	Attendance: 3,183; Referee: Clancy

5 May 2013 Scottish Premier League	Ross County	1 – 1	Celtic	Victoria Park
	Vigurs 41'	BBC Report	Stokes 4'	Attendance: 5,873; Referee: Mclean

12 May 2013 Scottish Premier League	Motherwell	2 – 0	Ross County	Fir Park
16:05	McFadden 8'; Humphrey 45'	BBC Report		Attendance: 7,734; Referee: Thomson

19 May 2013 Scottish Premier League	Ross County	1 – 0	Inverness Caledonian Thistle	Victoria Park
12:45	Hainault 44'	BBC Report		Attendance: 6,002; Referee: Norris

=== Scottish League Cup ===
28 August 2012 Scottish League Cup round 2	Ross County	1 – 4	Raith Rovers	Victoria Park
19:45	Duncan 84'	BBC Report	Spence 25'; Graham 41', 63'; Hill 51'	Attendance: 1,147; Referee: Mckendrick

=== Scottish Cup ===
1 December 2012 Scottish Cup round 4	Ross County	3 – 3	Inverness Caledonian Thistle	Victoria Park
12:15	Quinn 49'; Vigurs 86'; Brittain 90+3'	BBC Report	McKay 30'; Foran 74'; Roberts 90+5'	Attendance: 5,077; Referee: Craig Thomson

11 December 2012 Scottish Cup round 4 replay	Inverness Caledonian Thistle	2 – 1	Ross County	Caledonian Stadium
19:45	McKay 9' (Penalty), 54'	BBC Report	Vigurs 41'	Attendance: 4,135; Referee: Thomson

== Player statistics ==
=== Captains ===
No.	P	Name	Country	No. games	Notes
10	MF	Richard Brittain	(Scotland)	36	Club captain

Last updated: 19 May 2013
Source: Competitive match reports.
Competitive matches only
Matches started as captain only
Country: FIFA nationality; No.: Squad number; P: Position; Name: Player name; No. Games: Number of games started as captain.

=== Squad ===
Last updated 19 May 2013

No.	Pos	Nat	Player	Total		Premier League		League Cup		Scottish Cup	
No.	Pos	Nat	Player	Apps	Goals	Apps	Goals	Apps	Goals	Apps	Goals
1	GK	(Scotland) SCO	Michael Fraser	24	0	24+0	0	0+0	0	0+0	0
2	DF	(England) ENG	Jon Bateson	1	0	0+0	0	1+0	0	0+0	0
3	MF	(Scotland) SCO	Marc Fitzpatrick	23	0	18+2	0	1+0	0	2+0	0
3	DF	(Switzerland) SUI	Branislav Mićić	1	0	0+1	0	0+0	0	0+0	0
4	DF	(Scotland) SCO	Grant Munro	38	2	36+1	2	0+0	0	0+1	0
5	DF	(Scotland) SCO	Scott Boyd	38	0	34+1	0	1+0	0	2+0	0
6	DF	(Scotland) SCO	Ross Tokely	19	0	14+3	0	0+0	0	2+0	0
7	MF	(Scotland) SCO	Stuart Kettlewell	27	2	19+6	2	0+0	0	2+0	0
8	MF	(Scotland) SCO	Paul Lawson	23	2	20+2	2	1+0	0	0+0	0
9	FW	(Scotland) SCO	Colin McMenamin	20	1	11+8	1	0+0	0	1+0	0
10	MF	(Scotland) SCO	Richard Brittain	36	10	34+0	9	0+0	0	2+0	1
11	MF	(Scotland) SCO	Iain Vigurs	39	9	37+0	7	0+0	0	2+0	2
12	MF	(Scotland) SCO	Rocco Quinn	33	6	31+0	5	0+0	0	2+0	1
13	GK	(Scotland) SCO	Joe Malin	0	0	0+0	0	0+0	0	0+0	0
13	DF	(Canada) CAN	André Hainault	8	1	5+3	1	0+0	0	0+0	0
14	MF	(Scotland) SCO	Martin Scott	16	0	9+6	0	1+0	0	0+0	0
15	MF	(Scotland) SCO	Mark Corcoran	5	0	2+3	0	0+0	0	0+0	0
15	FW	(Germany) GER	Steffen Wohlfarth	16	3	6+10	3	0+0	0	0+0	0
16	FW	(Scotland) SCO	Steven Craig	0	0	0+0	0	0+0	0	0+0	0
16	MF	(Northern Ireland) NIR	Ivan Sproule	14	6	14+0	6	0+0	0	0+0	0
17	FW	(Northern Ireland) NIR	Sam Morrow	25	3	17+6	3	1+0	0	1+0	0
18	MF	(Scotland) SCO	Russell Duncan	4	1	1+2	0	1+0	1	0+0	0
18	DF	(Greece) GRE	Vangelis Ikonomou	18	0	18+0	0	0+0	0	0+0	0
19	FW	(Republic of Ireland) IRL	Kurtis Byrne	1	0	0+0	0	1+0	0	0+0	0
19	GK	(Scotland) SCO	Paul Gallacher	1	0	1+0	0	0+0	0	0+0	0
20	FW	(Scotland) SCO	Gary Glen	28	3	6+20	3	1+0	0	1+0	0
21	MF	(Scotland) SCO	Alex Cooper	16	0	7+8	0	0+0	0	0+1	0
22	DF	(Switzerland) SUI	Mihael Kovacevic	33	0	28+2	0	1+0	0	2+0	0
24	MF	(Scotland) SCO	Steven Ross	11	1	4+5	1	0+0	0	0+2	0
25	GK	(Scotland) SCO	Mark Brown	16	0	13+0	0	1+0	0	2+0	0
29	MF	(Scotland) SCO	Mark Fotheringham	16	0	12+2	0	0+0	0	1+1	0

=== Disciplinary record ===
Includes all competitive matches.

Last updated 19 May 2013

Number	Nation	Position	Name	Premier League		League Cup		Scottish Cup		Total	
Number	Nation	Position	Name	Booked	Sent off (straight red)	Booked	Sent off (straight red)	Booked	Sent off (straight red)	Booked	Sent off (straight red)
1	(Scotland)	GK	Michael Fraser	0	0	0	0	0	0	0	0
2	(England)	DF	Jon Bateson	0	0	0	0	0	0	0	0
3	(Scotland)	MF	Marc Fitzpatrick	2	0	1	0	0	0	3	0
4	(Scotland)	DF	Grant Munro	5	0	0	0	0	0	5	0
5	(Scotland)	DF	Scott Boyd	7	0	0	0	0	0	7	0
6	(Scotland)	DF	Ross Tokely	1	0	0	0	0	0	1	0
7	(Scotland)	MF	Stuart Kettlewell	7	0	0	0	1	0	8	0
8	(Scotland)	MF	Paul Lawson	4	0	0	0	0	0	4	0
9	(Scotland)	FW	Colin McMenamin	5	0	0	0	0	0	5	0
10	(Scotland)	MF	Richard Brittain	7	0	0	0	0	0	7	0
11	(Scotland)	MF	Iain Vigurs	8	0	0	0	1	0	9	0
12	(Scotland)	MF	Rocco Quinn	0	0	0	0	0	7	0	
13	(Scotland)	GK	Joe Malin	0	0	0	0	0	0	0	0
13	(Canada)	DF	André Hainault	0	0	0	0	0	0	0	0
14	(Scotland)	MF	Martin Scott	1	0	0	0	0	0	1	0
15	(Scotland)	MF	Mark Corcoran	0	0	0	0	0	0	0	0
15	(Germany)	FW	Steffen Wohlfarth	1	0	0	0	0	0	1	0
16	(Scotland)	FW	Steven Craig	0	0	0	0	0	0	0	0
16	(Northern Ireland)	MF	Ivan Sproule	1	0	0	0	0	0	1	0
17	(Northern Ireland)	FW	Sam Morrow	0	0	0	0	0	0	0	0
18	(Scotland)	MF	Russell Duncan	0	0	0	0	0	0	0	0
18	(Greece)	DF	Vangelis Ikonomou	3	0	0	0	0	0	3	0
19	(Republic of Ireland)	FW	Kurtis Byrne	0	0	0	0	0	0	0	0
19	(Scotland)	GK	Paul Gallacher	0	0	0	0	0	0	0	0
20	(Scotland)	FW	Gary Glen	0	0	0	0	0	0	0	0
21	(Scotland)	MF	Alex Cooper	2	0	0	0	0	0	2	0
22	(Switzerland)	DF	Mihael Kovacevic	4	0	0	0	0	0	4	0
24	(Scotland)	MF	Steven Ross	0	0	0	0	0	0	0	0
25	(Scotland)	GK	Mark Brown	0	0	0	0	0	0	0	0
29	(Scotland)	MF	Mark Fotheringham	5	0	0	0	1	0	6	0
3	(Switzerland)	DF	Branislav Mićić	1	0	0	0	0	0	1	0

== Team statistics ==
=== League table ===
Pos	Team	Pld	W	D	L	GF	GA	GD	Pts	Qualification or relegation
3	St Johnstone	38	14	14	10	45	44	+1	56	Qualification for the Europa League second qualifying round
4	Inverness Caledonian Thistle	38	13	15	10	64	60	+4	54	
5	Ross County	38	13	14	11	47	48	−1	53	
6	Dundee United	38	11	14	13	51	62	−11	47 (Note: Teams in the bottom half at the time of the split may not overtake a team in the top 6 at the time of the split.)	
7	Hibernian	38	13	12	13	49	52	−3	51	Qualification for the Europa League second qualifying round (Note: Since the winners of 2012–13 Scottish Cup, Celtic, qualified for European competition based on league position, the runners–up Hibernian secured a spot in Europa League second qualifying round.)

Source: SPFL Archive
Rules for classification: 1) points; 2) goal difference; 3) number of goals scored.

=== Division summary ===
Round	1	2	3	4	5	6	7	8	9	10	11	12	13	14	15	16	17	18	19	20	21	22	23	24	25	26	27	28	29	30	31	32	33	34	35	36	37	38
Ground	H	A	H	A	H	A	H	A	A	H	A	H	A	A	H	H	A	H	A	A	A	A	H	H	A	H	H	A	H	H	A	H	A	A	H	H	A	H
Result	D	D	D	W	D	D	L	L	L	W	D	W	L	D	L	D	L	D	L	W	W	D	W	D	W	W	W	W	D	W	L	L	L	D	W	D	L	W
Position	8	8	9	4	4	4	8	10	10	9	9	8	9	10	10	10	10	10	11	11	11	10	10	10	7	8	5	3	4	3	4	4	5	5	4	5	5	5

Updated to match(es) played on 19 May 2013. Source:
A = Away; H = Home; W = Win; D = Draw; L = Loss

== Transfers ==
=== Players in ===
Player	From	Fee
(Scotland) Ross Tokely	(Scotland) Inverness Caledonian Thistle	Free
(Scotland) Gary Glen	(Scotland) Heart of Midlothian	Free
(Scotland) Martin Scott	(Scotland) Hibernian	Loan
(Switzerland) Mihael Kovacevic	(Croatia) NK Zadar	Free
(England) Jon Bateson	(England) Mansfield Town	Free
(Scotland) Mark Brown	(Scotland) Hibernian	Free
(Scotland) Mark Fotheringham	(Scotland) Dundee	Free
(Northern Ireland) Ivan Sproule	(Scotland) Hibernian	Free
(Canada) André Hainault	(United States) Houston Dynamo	Free
(Greece) Vangelis Ikonomou	(Greece) Atromitos	Free
(Germany) Steffen Wohlfarth	(Germany) SV Wehen Wiesbaden	Free
(Switzerland) Branislav Mićić	(Switzerland) Sion	Free
(Scotland) Paul Gallacher	(Scotland) Dunfermline Athletic	Free

=== Players out ===
Player	To	Fee
(Scotland) Michael Gardyne	(Scotland) Dundee United	Free
(Scotland) Gary Miller	(Scotland) St Johnstone	Free
(Northern Ireland) Johnny Flynn	(Scotland) Falkirk	Free
(Scotland) Scott Morrison	(United States) Phoenix FC	Free
(Scotland) Steven Craig	(Scotland) Partick Thistle	Loan
(Scotland) Martin Groat	(Scotland) Fort William	Loan
(Republic of Ireland) Kurtis Byrne	(Scotland) Brechin City	Loan
(Republic of Ireland) Kurtis Byrne	(Republic of Ireland) Dundalk	Free
(England) Jon Bateson	Free agent	Free
(Scotland) Joe Malin	Free agent	Free
(Scotland) Russell Duncan	Free agent	Free
(Scotland) Steven Craig	(Scotland) Partick Thistle	Free
(Scotland) Mark Corcoran	(Scotland) Stenhousemuir	Free
(Scotland) Colin McMenamin	(Scotland) Greenock Morton	Free
(Scotland) Marc Fitzpatrick	(Scotland) Queen of the South	Free
(Scotland) Ross Tokely	(Scotland) Brora Rangers	Free

== See also ==
- List of Ross County F.C. seasons
