= 2014–15 Ross County F.C. season =

Ross County
2014–15 season
- Chairman: Roy MacGregor
- Manager: Derek Adams (until 28 August); Steven Ferguson (Interim); Jim McIntyre (from 9 September)
- Stadium: Victoria Park
- Premiership: Ninth place
- League Cup: Third round
- Scottish Cup: Fourth round
- Top goalscorer: League: Liam Boyce (10); All: Liam Boyce (11)
- Highest home attendance: 5,693 vs Celtic; Premiership; 18 October 2014
- Lowest home attendance: 1,819 vs Hibernian; League Cup; 23 September 2014
- Average home league attendance: 3,524
Home colours	Away colours

The 2014–15 season was the club's 2nd season in the Scottish Premiership and their third consecutive appearance in the top flight of Scottish football. Ross County also competed in the League Cup and the Scottish Cup.

== Season summary ==
County lost their first 7 games of the season and were rock-bottom of The Premiership. After the sacking of Derek Adams in late August, in September, they hired Jim McIntyre and started to pick up results. With County still bottom, McIntyre was backed by the board to bring in some new players. They failed to win a match between end of November to the end of January. After the 4-0 defeat away to Aberdeen in early February, County went on an unbeaten run up to the split, winning 8 of the next 9 matches. On 13 April, Liam Boyce scored the club's first ever top-flight hat-trick for County in a 3-0 win at St Mirren. On 16 May, County secured their Premiership status for the 2015-16 season after winning 2-1 against Hamilton Academical.

=== Management ===
Ross County began the 2014–15 season under the management of Derek Adams. On 28 August 2014, after a poor start to the season, Adams was sacked along with his father who was director of football at the club. On 9 September 2014, Jim McIntyre joined from Scottish Championship side Queen of the South with Billy Dodds as his assistant.

== Results and fixtures ==
Win Draw Loss Postponed

=== Pre season / Friendlies ===
22 July 2014 Friendly	Clachnacuddin	0 – 4	Ross County	Grant Street Park
19:45		Report	Maatsen 30'; Cardle 63'; Boyce 78'; Michael Finnis 89' (o.g.)

26 July 2014 Friendly	Nairn County	1 – 1	Ross County	Station Park
15:00	Adam Naismith 12'	Report	Boyce 49'

1 August 2014 Friendly	Jong FC Twente	2 – 1	Ross County	De Grolsch Veste
19:00	Merlin Schütte 20'; Hölscher 50'	Report	Jervis 53'

=== Scottish Premiership ===
10 August 2014 1	Ross County	1 – 2	St Johnstone	Victoria Park
15:00	Jervis 55'	BBC	O'Halloran 31'; MacLean 48'	Attendance: 3,287; Referee: Kevin Clancy

13 August 2014 2	Partick Thistle	4 – 0	Ross County	Firhill Stadium
19:45	Bannigan 40'; Frempah 55' (o.g.); Fraser 73'; O'Donnell 92'	BBC		Attendance: 3,261; Referee: Andrew Dallas

16 August 2014 3	Ross County	1 – 2	Kilmarnock	Victoria Park
15:00	Boyce 81'	BBC	Magennis 39'; Obadeyi 56'	Attendance: 2,790; Referee: Brian Colvin

23 August 2014 4	Dundee United	2 – 1	Ross County	Tannadice Park
15:00	Çiftçi 19'; Erskine 86'	BBC	Jervis 51'	Attendance: 7,179; Referee: McLean

30 August 2014 5	Hamilton Academical	4 – 0	Ross County	New Douglas Park
15:00	Canning 47'; Antoine-Curier 56' (pen.), 63' (pen.); Scotland 90'	BBC	Celcer (red card) 62'	Attendance: 2,684; Referee: Willie Collum

13 September 2014 6	Ross County	1 – 2	Motherwell	Victoria Park
15:00	Boyce 78'	BBC	Vigurs 49'; Sutton 54'	Attendance: 3,012; Referee: Steven McLean

20 September 2014 7	Aberdeen	3 – 0	Ross County	Pittodrie Stadium
15:00	Rooney 20'; Goodwillie 26'; Pawlett 50'	BBC		Attendance: 10,865; Referee: Thomson

27 September 2014 8	Ross County	2 – 1	Dundee	Victoria Park
15:00	Gardyne 27'; Maatsen 90'	Report	Clarkson 69'	Attendance: 3,118; Referee: Craig Charleston

5 October 2014 9	Inverness Caledonian Thistle	1 – 1	Ross County	Caledonian Stadium
12:45	Watkins 49'	BBC	Arquin 21'	Attendance: 3,741; Referee: Thomson

27 September 2014 10	Ross County	0 – 5	Celtic	Victoria Park
15:00		BBC	Guidetti 11'; McGregor 14'; Stokes 29', 56'; Denayer 35'	Attendance: 5,693; Referee: Bobby Madden

25 October 2014 11	St Mirren	2 – 2	Ross County	St Mirren Park
15:00	Drury 44'; Tesselaar 60'	BBC	Quinn 11'; Carey 58'	Attendance: 3,459; Referee: Don Robertson

3 November 2014 12	Ross County	0 – 1	Aberdeen	Victoria Park
19:45		BBC	Quinn 56' (o.g.)	Attendance: 3,745; Referee: Collum

8 November 2014 13	Kilmarnock	0 – 3	Ross County	Rugby Park
15:00		BBC	Carey 33'; Gardyne 40'; Quinn 45'	Attendance: 3,684; Referee: Stephen Finnie

22 November 2014 14	St Johnstone	2 – 1	Ross County	McDiarmid Park
15:00	McFadden 39'; O'Halloran 73'	BBC	Jervis 75'	Attendance: 2,776; Referee: Steven McLean

5 December 2014 15	Ross County	2 – 3	Dundee United	Victoria Park
19:45	Arquin 76'; Maatsen 89'; Boyce (red card) 84'	BBC	Çiftçi 21', 58'; Armstrong 49'	Attendance: 2,922; Referee: Madden

13 December 2014 16	Motherwell	2 – 2	Ross County	Fir Park
15:00	Sutton 53'; Ojamaa 59'	BBC	Dingwall 45', 90'	Attendance: 3,193; Referee: Willie Collum

20 December 2014 17	Ross County	0 – 1	Hamilton Academical	Victoria Park
15:00		BBC	Canning 6'	Attendance: 2,966; Referee: John Beaton

27 December 2014 18	Celtic	0 – 0	Ross County	Celtic Park
15:00		BBC Sport		Attendance: 45,798; Referee: Crawford Allan

1 January 2015 19	Ross County	1 – 3	Inverness Caledonian Thistle	Victoria Park
15.00	Jackson Irvine 60'	BBC	Aaron Doran 27', 58'; Billy McKay 73'	Attendance: 4,887; Referee: McLean

4 January 2015 20	Dundee	1 – 1	Ross County	Dens Park
15:00	McAlister 52'	BBC	Dunfield (red card) 9'; Curran 65'	Attendance: 5,017; Referee: Craig Thomson

17 January 2015 21	Ross County	1 – 2	St Mirren	Victoria Park
15:00	Boyce 82'	BBC	Kelly 16'; Arquin (red card) 38'; Mallan 87'	Attendance: 3,005; Referee: Brian Colvin

24 January 2015 22	Ross County	0 – 1	Celtic	Victoria Park
15:00		BBC Sport	Commons 52'	Attendance: 5,289; Referee: Kevin Clancy

31 January 2015 23	Inverness Caledonian Thistle	1 – 1	Ross County	Caledonian Stadium
15.00	Watkins 38'	BBC	Warren 76' (o.g.)	Attendance: 4,021; Referee: Beaton

7 February 2015 24	Aberdeen	4 – 0	Ross County	Pittodrie Stadium
15:00	Rooney 12'; Pawlett 50'; Logan 61'; Goodwillie 85'	BBC		Attendance: 12,036; Referee: Thomson

14 February 2015 25	Ross County	3 – 2	Motherwell	Victoria Park
15:00	Woods 34'; P.Quinn 58'; De Vita 62'	BBC	Grant 53'; Kerr 78'	Attendance: 2,982; Referee: Calum Murray

21 February 2015 26	Partick Thistle	1 – 3	Ross County	Firhill Stadium
15:00	Taylor 68'	BBC	Curran 11'; De Vita 65'; Fraser 71'	Attendance: 2,951; Referee: Stephen Finnie

28 February 2015 27	Ross County	1 – 0	Dundee	Victoria Park
15:00	Reckord 66'	BBC		Attendance: 3,413; Referee: Andrew Dallas

7 March 2015 28	Ross County	1 – 0	Partick Thistle	Victoria Park
15:00	Curran 11'	BBC	Higginbotham (red card) 59'	Attendance: 3,358; Referee: Alan Muir

14 March 2015 29	Hamilton Academical	2 – 2	Ross County	New Douglas Park
15:00	Scotland 2'; Imrie 18'	BBC	Curran 28'; Gardyne 72'	Attendance: 1,544; Referee: Craig Thomson

21 March 2015 30	Ross County	2 – 1	Kilmarnock	Victoria Park
15:00	Gardyne 23'; Curran 59'	BBC	Ashcroft 88'	Attendance: 3,389; Referee: Bobby Madden

4 April 2015 31	Dundee United	1 – 2	Ross County	Tannadice Park
15:00	Çiftçi 20' (pen.)	BBC	Irvine 12'; De Vita 72'	Attendance: 6,187; Referee: McLean

7 April 2015 32	Ross County	1 – 0	St Johnstone	Victoria Park
19:45	Boyce 84'	BBC		Attendance: 3,319; Referee: Kevin Clancy

13 April 2014 33	St Mirren	0 – 3	Ross County	St Mirren Park
19:45	Genev (red card) 49'	BBC	Boyce 30', 75', 90'	Attendance: 3,033; Referee: Willie Collum

25 April 2015 34	Ross County	1 – 2	Partick Thistle	Victoria Park
15:00	Gardyne 23'	BBC	Frans 26'; O'Donnell 54'	Attendance: 3,315; Referee: Don Robertson

2 May 2015 35	Motherwell	1 – 1	Ross County	Fir Park
15:00	McDonald 19'	BBC	Boyce 41'	Attendance: 4,281; Referee: Crawford Allan

9 May 2015 36	Ross County	1 – 2	St Mirren	Victoria Park
15:00	Woods 31' (pen.); Brown (red card) 90'	BBC	Mallan 39'; Thompson 91' (pen.)	Attendance: 3,098; Referee: McLean

16 May 2015 37	Ross County	2 – 1	Hamilton Academical	Victoria Park
15:00	Gardyne 58'; Kiss (red card) 82'; Boyce 85'	BBC	Lucas 27'	Attendance: 3,381; Referee: Bobby Madden

23 May 2015 38	Kilmarnock	1 – 2	Ross County	Rugby Park
15:00	Kiltie 36'	BBC	Boyce 63'; Quinn 76'	Attendance: 4,226; Referee: Euan Anderson

=== Scottish League Cup ===
26 August 2014 Second Round	Stranraer	1 – 2	Ross County	Stair Park
19:45	Sean Winter 3'	BBC	de Leeuw 15'; Boyce 69'	Attendance: 297; Referee: Craig Charleston

23 September 2014 Third Round	Ross County	0 – 2	Hibernian	Victoria Park
19:45		Report	Malonga 22', 36'; McGeouch (red card) 83'	Attendance: 1,819; Referee: Stephen Finnie

=== Scottish Cup ===
29 November 2014 Fourth Round	St Johnstone	2 – 1	Ross County	McDiarmid Park
15:00	O'Halloran 7'; McFadden 12'	BBC	Jervis 63'	Attendance: 2,383; Referee: John Beaton

== Squad statistics ==
During the 2014–15 season, Ross County have used thirty four different players in competitive games. The table below shows the number of appearances and goals scored by each player. This table also shows players who were on the bench and did not play.

=== Appearances ===
As of 23 May 2015

No.	Pos	Nat	Player	Total		Premiership		League Cup		Scottish Cup	
No.	Pos	Nat	Player	Apps	Goals	Apps	Goals	Apps	Goals	Apps	Goals
1	GK	(Spain) ESP	Antonio Reguero	16	0	16	0	0	0	0	0
3	DF	(Ivory Coast) CIV	Abdoulaye Méïté	0	0	0	0	0	0	0	0
4	MF	(Scotland) SCO	Rocco Quinn	15	1	8+5	1	1+1	0	0	0
5	DF	(Scotland) SCO	Scott Boyd	34	0	31+1	0	1	0	1	0
6	DF	(Scotland) SCO	Steven Saunders	7	0	6+1	0	0	0	0	0
7	MF	(England) ENG	Joe Cardle	25	0	11+11	0	2	0	1	0
8	MF	(Scotland) SCO	Richard Brittain	24	0	18+3	0	1+1	0	1	0
9	FW	(England) ENG	Jake Jervis	29	4	10+17	3	1	0	1	1
10	MF	(Slovakia) SVK	Filip Kiss	33	0	21+10	0	2	0	0	0
11	FW	(England) ENG	Craig Curran	19	5	17+2	5	0	0	0	0
12	DF	(England) ENG	Jamie Reckord	27	1	26	1	0	0	1	0
13	MF	(Scotland) SCO	Darren Barr	6	0	5+1	0	0	0	0	0
16	FW	(Northern Ireland) NIR	Liam Boyce	33	11	17+13	10	0+2	1	0+1	0
17	FW	(Scotland) SCO	Steven Ross	5	0	2+3	0	0	0	0	0
18	DF	(England) ENG	Ben Frempah	8	0	4+2	0	1+1	0	0	0
20	MF	(Lithuania) LTU	Darvydas Šernas	5	0	0+5	0	0	0	0	0
21	GK	(Scotland) SCO	Mark Brown	25	0	22	0	2	0	1	0
22	MF	(Spain) ESP	Rubén Palazuelos	5	0	1+4	0	0	0	0	0
23	MF	(Republic of Ireland) IRL	Graham Carey	25	2	17+5	2	2	0	1	0
24	MF	(Italy) ITA	Raffaele De Vita	14	3	13+1	3	0	0	0	0
26	MF	(Scotland) SCO	Martin Woods	28	2	26+1	2	0	0	1	0
29	FW	(Scotland) SCO	Kyle MacLeod	0	0	0	0	0	0	0	0
30	MF	(Scotland) SCO	Tony Dingwall	20	2	10+9	2	0	0	1	0
31	MF	(Canada) CAN	Terry Dunfield	4	0	4	0	0	0	0	0
33	GK	(Scotland) SCO	Peter Tait	0	0	0	0	0	0	0	0
36	MF	(Australia) AUS	Jackson Irvine	30	2	27+1	2	1	0	1	0
38	DF	(Australia) AUS	Cameron Burgess	0	0	0	0	0	0	0	0
40	FW	(Scotland) SCO	Michael Gardyne	26	6	22+2	6	0+1	0	0+1	0
43	DF	(Scotland) SCO	Paul Quinn	30	3	28+1	3	0	0	1	0
44	DF	(Scotland) SCO	Marcus Fraser	16	1	16	1	0	0	0	0
Players who left the club during the 2014–15 season
2	DF	(Belgium) BEL	Tim Dreesen	4	0	3	0	1	0	0	0
3	DF	(Slovenia) SVN	Uroš Celcer	6	0	5	0	1	0	0	0
11	FW	(Netherlands) NED	Melvin de Leeuw	8	1	3+3	0	2	1	0	0
14	FW	(Netherlands) NED	Darren Maatsen	8	2	0+8	2	0	0	0	0
15	FW	(Martinique) MTQ	Yoann Arquin	19	2	14+3	2	1	0	0+1	0
19	DF	(England) ENG	Jim Fenlon	6	0	4	0	2	0	0	0
20	MF	(Netherlands) NED	Jordi Balk	5	0	4	0	1	0	0	0
25	DF	(Scotland) SCO	Lewis Toshney	9	0	7+2	0	0	0	0	0

=== Disciplinary record ===
Includes all competitive matches.

Last updated 23 May 2015

Number	Nation	Position	Name	Premiership		League Cup		Scottish Cup		Total	
Number	Nation	Position	Name	Booked	Sent off (straight red)	Booked	Sent off (straight red)	Booked	Sent off (straight red)	Booked	Sent off (straight red)
1	(Spain)	GK	Antonio Reguero	1	0	0	0	0	0	1	0
2	(Belgium)	DF	Tim Dreesen	2	0	0	0	0	0	2	0
3	(Slovenia)	DF	Uroš Celcer	1	1	0	0	0	0	1	1
4	(Scotland)	DF	Rocco Quinn	2	0	0	0	0	0	2	0
5	(Scotland)	DF	Scott Boyd	6	0	0	0	0	0	6	0
6	(Scotland)	DF	Steven Saunders	3	0	0	0	0	0	3	0
8	(Scotland)	MF	Richard Brittain	4	0	0	0	0	0	4	0
9	(England)	FW	Jake Jervis	1	0	0	0	0	0	1	0
10	(Slovakia)	MF	Filip Kiss	7	1	0	0	0	0	7	1
11	(Netherlands)	FW	Melvin de Leeuw	3	0	0	0	0	0	3	0
11	(England)	FW	Craig Curran	1	0	0	0	0	0	1	0
12	(England)	DF	Jamie Reckord	5	0	0	0	1	0	6	0
15	(Martinique)	FW	Yoann Arquin	2	0	0	0	0	0	2	0
16	(Northern Ireland)	FW	Liam Boyce	2	1	0	0	0	0	2	1
19	(England)	DF	Jim Fenlon	1	0	0	0	0	0	1	0
20	(Netherlands)	MF	Jordi Balk	1	0	0	0	0	0	1	0
20	(Lithuania)	MF	Darvydas Šernas	1	0	0	0	0	0	1	0
21	(Scotland)	GK	Mark Brown	0	1	0	0	0	0	0	1
23	(Republic of Ireland)	DF	Graham Carey	5	0	1	0	1	0	7	0
24	(Italy)	MF	Raffaele De Vita	2	0	0	0	0	0	2	0
26	(Scotland)	MF	Martin Woods	5	0	0	0	0	0	5	0
30	(Scotland)	MF	Tony Dingwall	1	0	0	0	0	0	1	0
31	(Canada)	MF	Terry Dunfield	1	1	0	0	0	0	1	1
36	(Australia)	MF	Jackson Irvine	7	0	0	0	0	0	7	0
40	(Scotland)	FW	Michael Gardyne	2	0	1	0	0	0	3	0
43	(Scotland)	DF	Paul Quinn	4	0	0	0	1	0	5	0
44	(Scotland)	DF	Marcus Fraser	4	0	0	0	0	0	4	0
			TOTALS	73	5	2	0	3	0	78	5

=== Goal scorers ===
As of 23 May 2015

Ranking	Nation	Number	Name	Scottish Premiership	League Cup	Scottish Cup	Total
1	(Northern Ireland)	16	Liam Boyce	10	1	0	11
2	(Scotland)	40	Michael Gardyne	6	0	0	6
3	(England)	11	Craig Curran	5	0	0	5
4	(England)	9	Jake Jervis	3	0	1	4
5	(Italy)	24	Raffaele De Vita	3	0	0	3
5	(Scotland)	43	Paul Quinn	3	0	0	3
7	(Netherlands)	14	Darren Maatsen	2	0	0	2
7	(Martinique)	15	Yoann Arquin	2	0	0	2
7	(Republic of Ireland)	23	Graham Carey	2	0	0	2
7	(Scotland)	26	Martin Woods	2	0	0	2
7	(Scotland)	30	Tony Dingwall	2	0	0	2
7	(Australia)	36	Jackson Irvine	2	0	0	2
13	(Scotland)	4	Rocco Quinn	1	0	0	1
13	(Netherlands)	11	Melvin de Leeuw	0	1	0	1
13	(England)	12	Jamie Reckord	1	0	0	1
13	(Scotland)	44	Marcus Fraser	1	0	0	1
			Own goals	1	0	0	1
			TOTALS	46	2	1	49

== Team statistics ==
=== League table ===
Pos	Team	Pld	W	D	L	GF	GA	GD	Pts	Qualification or relegation
7	Hamilton Academical	38	15	8	15	50	53	−3	53	
8	Partick Thistle	38	12	10	16	48	44	+4	46	
9	Ross County	38	12	8	18	46	63	−17	44	
10	Kilmarnock	38	11	8	19	44	59	−15	41	
11	Motherwell (O)	38	10	6	22	38	63	−25	36	Qualification for the Premiership play-off final

Source: SPFL
Rules for classification: 1) points; 2) goal difference; 3) number of goals scored
(O) Play-off winners

=== Results by round ===
Round	1	2	3	4	5	6	7	8	9	10	11	12	13	14	15	16	17	18	19	20	21	22	23	24	25	26	27	28	29	30	31	32	33	34	35	36	37	38
Ground	H	A	H	A	A	H	A	H	A	H	A	H	A	A	H	A	H	A	H	A	H	H	A	A	H	A	H	H	A	H	A	H	A	H	A	H	H	A
Result	L	L	L	L	L	L	L	W	D	L	D	L	W	L	L	D	L	D	L	D	L	L	D	L	W	W	W	W	D	W	W	W	W	L	D	L	W	W
Position	9	12	12	12	12	12	12	12	12	12	12	12	12	12	12	11	11	12	12	12	12	12	12	12	12	10	10	10	10	10	10	10	10	10	10	10	10	9

Updated to match(es) played on 23 May 2015. Source: BBC Sport
A = Away; H = Home; W = Win; D = Draw; L = Loss

=== Results by opponent ===
Ross County score first

Team	Results				Points
Team	1	2	3	4	Points
Aberdeen	0-3	0-1	0-4	X	0
Celtic	0-5	0-0	0-1	X	1
Dundee	2-1	1-1	1-0	X	7
Dundee United	1-2	2-3	2-1	X	3
Hamilton Academical	0-4	0-1	2-2	2-1	4
Inverness C.T.	1-1	1-3	1-1	X	2
Kilmarnock	1-2	3-0	2-1	2-1	9
Motherwell	1-2	2-2	3-2	1-1	5
Partick Thistle	0-4	3-1	1-0	1-2	6
St Johnstone	1-2	1-2	1-0	X	3
St Mirren	2-2	1-2	3-0	1-2	4

Source: 2014–15 Scottish Premier League Results Table

== Awards ==
=== Player of the Month ===
Player	Month
Raffaele De Vita	March

=== Manager of the Month ===
Manager	Month
Jim McIntyre	February
Jim McIntyre	March

== Transfers ==
=== Players In ===
Player	From	Fee
(England) Joe Cardle	(Scotland) Raith Rovers	Free
(England) Jake Jervis	(England) Portsmouth	Free
(Northern Ireland) Liam Boyce	(Northern Ireland) Cliftonville	Free
(Spain) Antonio Reguero	(Scotland) Kilmarnock	Free
(Belgium) Tim Dreesen	(Netherlands) Fortuna Sittard	Free
(Netherlands) Jordi Balk	(Netherlands) Utrecht	Free
(England) Ben Frempah	(England) Leicester City	Free
(England) Jim Fenlon	(England) AFC Wimbledon	Free
(Slovakia) Filip Kiss	(Wales) Cardiff City	Loan
(Slovenia) Uroš Celcer	(Italy) Parma	Free
(France) Rosario Latouchent	(France) Caen	Free
(Scotland) Michael Gardyne	(Scotland) Dundee United	Loan
(Scotland) Darren Barr	(Scotland) Kilmarnock	Free
(Australia) Jackson Irvine	(Scotland) Celtic	Loan
(Scotland) Lewis Toshney	(Scotland) Celtic	Free
(Scotland) Martin Woods	(England) Barnsley	Free
(Canada) Terry Dunfield	(England) Oldham Athletic	Free
(England) Jamie Reckord	(England) Wolverhampton Wanderers	Free
(England) Craig Curran	(England) Nuneaton Town	Free
(Australia) Cameron Burgess	(England) Fulham	Loan
(Scotland) Marcus Fraser	(Scotland) Celtic	Free
(Lithuania) Darvydas Šernas	(Poland) Wigry Suwałki	Free
(Spain) Rubén Palazuelos	(Cyprus) Ermis Aradippou	Free
(Italy) Raffaele De Vita	(England) Cheltenham Town	Free
(Ivory Coast) Abdoulaye Meite	(Greece) OFI	Free

=== Players Out ===
Player	From	Fee
(Scotland) Gordon Finlayson	(Scotland) Elgin City	Free
(Scotland) Michael Fraser	(Scotland) Elgin City	Free
(England) Ben Gordon	(England) Colchester United	Free
(Scotland) Alex Cooper	(Scotland) Falkirk	Free
(Scotland) Gary Glen	(Scotland) Livingston	Free
(Northern Ireland) Brian McLean	Free Agent	Free
(Greece) Evangelos Ikonomou	(Cyprus) Doxa Katokopias	Free
(Scotland) Stuart Kettlewell	(Scotland) Brora Rangers	Free
(Netherlands) Marc Klok	(Bulgaria) Cherno More Varna	Free
(Netherlands) Melvin de Leeuw	Free Agent	Free
(France) Rosario Latouchent	Free Agent	Free
(Slovenia) Uroš Celcer	Free Agent	Free
(Belgium) Tim Dreesen	Free Agent	Free
(Netherlands) Jordi Balk	(Netherlands) TOP Oss	Free
(Martinique) Yoann Arquin	(Scotland) St Mirren	Free
(Netherlands) Darren Maatsen	(Netherlands) Den Bosch	Free
(Scotland) Lewis Toshney	(Scotland) Cowdenbeath	Free

== See also ==
- List of Ross County F.C. seasons
