= 2011–12 Ross County F.C. season =

Ross County
2011–12 season
- Chairman: Roy MacGregor
- Manager: Derek Adams
- Stadium: Victoria Park
- Scottish First Division: Winners
- Challenge Cup: First round
- League Cup: Third round
- Scottish Cup: Fifth round
- Top goalscorer: League: Colin McMenamin (19); All: Colin McMenamin (20)
- Highest home attendance: 4,737 vs. Hamilton Academical, 28 April 2012
- Lowest home attendance: 2,047 vs. Livingston, 17 September 2011
- Average home league attendance: 2,745
Home colours	Away colours

The 2011–12 season was Ross County's fourth consecutive season in the Scottish First Division, having been promoted as champions of the Scottish Second Division at the end of 2007–08 season. They also competed in the Challenge Cup, League Cup and the Scottish Cup.

== Summary ==
Ross County finished first in the First Division and were promoted to the Premier League for the first time. They reached the first round of the Challenge Cup, the third round of the League Cup and the fifth round of the Scottish Cup.

== Results and fixtures ==
Win Draw Loss Postponed

=== Pre-season ===
2 July 2011 Friendly	Brora Rangers	0–2	Ross County	Dudgeon Park
		Fan Site Report	Craig 33'; Duncan 85'	Referee: Jim Lyon

5 July 2011 Friendly	Clachnacuddin	0–2	Ross County	Grant Street Park
		Fan Site Report	Munro; Corcoran 80'	Referee: Graham Fraser

7 July 2011 Friendly	Forres Mechanics	2–4	Ross County	Mosset Park
	Morrison 48'; Tweedie 80'	Fan Site Report	Craig, 10'; Lawson 17'; Byrne 42'	Referee: Craig Sim

12 July 2011 Friendly	Keith	0–2	Ross County	Kynoch Park
		Fan Site Report	Brittain; McMenamin

16 July 2011 Friendly	Kilmarnock	2–1	Ross County	Rugby Park
	Harkins 1'; Buijs 6'	Scotsman Report	Corcoran 74'

=== Scottish First Division ===
6 August 2011 First Division	Ross County	0–0	Morton	Victoria Park
		BBC Sport		Attendance: 2,249; Referee: Steven McLean

13 August 2011 First Division	Hamilton Academical	5–1	Ross County	New Douglas Park, Hamilton
	McLaughlin 23'; Crawford 39'; Chambers 42' (pen.); Paterson 57'; Anderson 90'	BBC Sport	Flynn (red card) 41'; Byrne 77'	Attendance: 1,744; Referee: Calum Murray

20 August 2011 First Division	Ross County	2–0	Queen of the South	Victoria Park
	Kettlewell (red card) 70'; Craig 87', 90'	BBC Sport		Attendance: 2,065; Referee: Steve Conroy

27 August 2011 First Division	Falkirk	1–1	Ross County	Falkirk Stadium, Falkirk
	El Alagui 87'	BBC Report	Craig 75'	Attendance: 3,009; Referee: Tumilty

10 September 2011 First Division	Ross County	2–2	Partick Thistle	Victoria Park, Dingwall
	Brittain 13' (pen.); Gardyne 47'; Miller (red card) 72'	BBC Sport	Cairney 73' (pen.); Erskine 89'	Attendance: 2,189; Referee: Allan

17 September 2011 First Division	Ross County	1–1	Livingston	Victoria Park
	Brittain 45'; Craig (red card) 64'	BBC Sport	Sinclair 40'; Watson (yellow card) 65' (red card)	Attendance: 2,047; Referee: Northcroft

24 September 2011 First Division	Raith Rovers	0–1	Ross County	Stark's Park, Kirkcaldy
		BBC Sport	Boyd 82'	Attendance: 1,479; Referee: John McKendrick

1 October 2011 First Division	Ross County	4–0	Ayr United	Victoria Park, Dingwall
	Brittain 5'; Lawson 64'; Morrow 69'; Vigurs 87'	BBC Sport		Attendance: 2,121; Referee: Hilland

15 October 2011 First Division	Dundee	1–2	Ross County	Dens Park, Dundee
	Lockwood 25' (pen.)	BBC Sport	McMenamin 39'; Quinn 63'	Attendance: 4,030; Referee: Stephen Finnie

22 October 2011 First Division	Ross County	1–0	Hamilton Academical	Victoria Park, Dingwall
	Munro 31'	BBC Sport		Attendance: 2,431; Referee: Allan

29 October 2011 First Division	Greenock Morton	0–2	Ross County	Cappielow Park, Greenock
		BBC Sport	Kettlewell 34'; Stewart 90' (o.g.)	Attendance: 1,748; Referee: Richmond

5 November 2011 First Division	Partick Thistle	0–1	Ross County	Firhill Stadium, Glasgow
		BBC Sport	Vigurs 26'	Attendance: 2,472; Referee: Norris

12 November 2011 First Division	Ross County	3–1	Falkirk	Victoria Park, Dingwall
	Kettlewell 4'; Gardyne 52'; Miller 83'	BBC Sport	Wallace 10'	Attendance: 4,108; Referee: Somers

26 November 2011 First Division	Livingston	0–3	Ross County	Braidwood Motor Company Stadium, Livingston
	Boulding (red card) 56'	SFL Report	Gardyne 65'; McMenamin 72', 74'	Attendance: 1,628; Referee: Tumilty

3 December 2011 First Division	Ross County	4–2	Raith Rovers	Victoria Park, Dingwall
	Quinn 28'; McMenamin 45', 62'; Gardyne 81'	BBC Sport	Walker 12', 36'	Attendance: 2,698; Referee: Charleston

10 December 2011 First Division	Ayr United	P – P	Ross County	Somerset Park, Ayr

17 December 2011 First Division	Ross County	1–1	Dundee	Victoria Park, Dingwall
	McMenamin 82'	SFL Report	Milne 35'; O'Donnell (red card) 36'	Attendance: 3,046; Referee: Salmond

26 December 2011 First Division	Falkirk	1–1	Ross County	Falkirk Stadium, Falkirk
	Duffie 77'	SFL Sport	McMenamin 90+4'	Attendance: 4,383; Referee: Richmond

2 January 2012 First Division	Ross County	P – P	Partick Thistle	Victoria Park, Dingwall

14 January 2012 First Division	Queen of the South	0–0	Ross County	Palmerston Park, Dumfries
		BBC Sport		Attendance: 1,314; Referee: Brines

21 January 2012 First Division	Ross County	P – P	Greenock Morton	Victoria Park, Dingwall

28 January 2012 First Division	Ross County	3–0	Livingston	Victoria Park, Dingwall
	McMenamin 28', 82'; Morrow 87'	SFL Report		Attendance: 2,514; Referee: McKendrick

11 February 2012 First Division	Raith Rovers	1–1	Ross County	Stark's Park, Kirkcaldy
	Walker 89'	BBC Sport	Craig 53'	Attendance: 1,702; Referee: Calum Murray

18 February 2012 First Division	Ross County	1–1	Ayr United	Victoria Park, Dingwall
	Munro 7'	SFL Sport	Tomsett 79'; Tiffoney (red card) 81'	Attendance: 2,390; Referee: Norris

25 February 2012 First Division	Dundee	1–1	Ross County	Dens Park, Dundee
	Conroy 33' (Penalty)	SFL Sport	Kettlewell 11'	Attendance: 5,003; Referee: Tumilty

29 February 2012 First Division	Ayr United	2–3	Ross County	Somerset Park, Ayr
	Parker 52', 75'	SFL Report	Brittain 16', 38' (Penalty), 80'	Attendance: 1,096; Referee: Clancy

3 March 2012 First Division	Ross County	2–1	Queen of the South	Victoria Park, Dingwall
	Vigurs 23' Gardyne 72'	SFL Report	McGuffie 57'	Attendance: 2,578; Referee: O'Reilly

6 March 2012 First Division	Ross County	3–0	Partick Thistle	Victoria Park, Dingwall
	McMenamin 30'; Vigurs 36'; Gardyne 50'	SFL Report		Attendance: 2,200; Referee: Brines

10 March 2012 First Division	Hamilton Academical	0–2	Ross County	New Douglas Park, Hamilton
		SFL Sport	McMenamin 7'; Boyd 16'	Attendance: 1,743; Referee: McKendrick

17 March 2012 First Division	Ross County	2–1	Falkirk	Victoria Park, Dingwall
	Brittain 19' (Penalty); Quinn 25'	SFL Report	McGovern (red card) 16'; Millar 62'; El Alagui (yellow card) 82' (red card)	Attendance: 4,302; Referee: Brines

24 March 2012 First Division	Partick Thistle	0–1	Ross County	Firhill Stadium, Glasgow
		BBC Sport	McMenamin 44'	Attendance: 2,480; Referee: Beaton

31 March 2012 First Division	Ross County	1–1	Raith Rovers	Victoria Park, Dingwall
	Lawson 85'	BBC Sport	Clarke 90' (pen.)	Attendance: 3,379; Referee: McLean

7 April 2012 First Division	Livingston	1–3	Ross County	Braidwood Motor Company Stadium, Livingston
	Boulding 46'	SFL Report	McMenamin 38', 69'; Vigurs 86'	Attendance: 2,004; Referee: Richmond

11 April 2012 First Division	Ayr United	1–3	Ross County	Somerset Park, Ayr
	Trouten 63'	BBC Report	Gardyne 46'; McMenamin 67'; Morrow 84'	Attendance: 1,389; Referee: Colvin

14 April 2012 First Division	Ross County	3–0	Dundee	Victoria Park, Dingwall
	Gardyne 9', 64'; McMenamin 61'; Quinn (yellow card) 80' (red card)	BBC Sport	McBride (red card) 80'	Attendance: 4,350; Referee: McKendrick

21 April 2012 First Division	Greenock Morton	1–1	Ross County	Cappielow Park, Greenock
	Smyth 41'	SFL Report	McMenamin 6'	Attendance: 1,306; Referee: Winter

28 April 2012 First Division	Ross County	5–1	Hamilton Academical	Victoria Park, Dingwall
	McMenamin 5'; Brittain 40', 54'; Kettlewell 46'; Gardyne 77'	SFL Sport	McAlister 45'	Attendance: 4,737; Referee: Norris

5 May 2012 First Division	Queen of the South	3–5	Ross County	Palmerston Park, Dumfries
	Carmichael 10'; Parkin 15'; Reilly 53'	BBC Sport	Kettlewell 11'; Gardyne 39', 77'; McMenamin 57'; Byrne 90'	Attendance: 1,323; Referee: Somers

=== Scottish Challenge Cup ===
23 July 2011 Scottish Challenge Cup round 1	Ross County	1–2	Elgin City	Victoria Park, Dingwall
	Morrison 2'	BBC Sport	Cameron 37'; Leslie 61'	Attendance: 1,368; Referee: Matt Northcroft

=== Scottish League Cup ===
30 July 2011 Scottish League Cup round 1	Ross County	2–1	Queen's Park	Victoria Park, Dingwall
	McMenamin 58'; Flynn 75'	BBC Sport	Daly 5'; Meggatt (red card) 40'	Attendance: 949; Referee: Frank McDermott

23 August 2011 Scottish League Cup round 2	Hamilton Academical	1–2	Ross County	New Douglas Park, Hamilton
	Chambers 2' (pen.)	BBC Sport	Gardyne 65'; Craig 82'	Attendance: 828; Referee: Mike Tumilty

21 September 2011 Scottish League Cup round 3	Ross County	0–2	Celtic	Victoria Park, Dingwall
		BBC Sport	Hooper 13'; Boyd 51' (o.g.)	Attendance: 5,367; Referee: Calum Murray

=== Scottish Cup ===
19 November 2011 Scottish Cup round 3	Ross County	4–0	Albion Rovers	Victoria Park, Dingwall
	Gardyne 9', 70', 91'; Lawson 27'	BBC Report		Attendance: 1,353; Referee: Clancy

7 January 2012 Scottish Cup round 4	Ross County	7–0	Stenhousemuir	Victoria Park, Dingwall
	Vigurs 5', 75'; Brittain 52' (Penalty); Gardyne 62'; Craig 71'; Byrne 87', 88'	BBC Report		Attendance: 1,421; Referee: Allan

4 February 2012 Scottish Cup round 5	St Mirren	1–1	Ross County	St Mirren Park
	Thompson 43'	BBC Sport	Brittain 40' (pen.)	Attendance: 3,334; Referee: Madden

14 February 2012 Scottish Cup round 5 replay	Ross County	1–2	St Mirren	Victoria Park
	Morrow 55'	BBC Report	Teale 14'; Thompson (red card) 37'; Hasselbaink 53'	Attendance: 2,334; Referee: Madden

== Player statistics ==
=== Captains ===
No.	P	Name	Country	No. games	Notes
	MF	Richard Brittain	(Scotland)	40	Club captain

Last updated: 5 May 2012
Source: Competitive match reports.
Competitive matches only
Matches started as captain only
Country: FIFA nationality; No.: Squad number; P: Position; Name: Player name; No. Games: Number of games started as captain.

=== Squad ===
Last updated 5 May 2012

No.	Pos	Nat	Player	Total		Scottish First Division		Scottish Cup		League Cup		Challenge Cup	
No.	Pos	Nat	Player	Apps	Goals	Apps	Goals	Apps	Goals	Apps	Goals	Apps	Goals
	GK	(Scotland) SCO	Joe Malin	1	0	0+0	0	1+0	0	0+0	0	0+0	0
	GK	(Scotland) SCO	Michael Fraser	42	0	35+0	0	3+0	0	3+0	0	1+0	0
	DF	(Scotland) SCO	Scott Boyd	41	2	33+1	2	4+0	0	3+0	0	0+0	0
	DF	(Scotland) SCO	Grant Munro	40	2	33+0	2	3+0	0	3+0	0	1+0	0
	DF	(Northern Ireland) NIR	Johnny Flynn	10	1	3+4	0	1+0	0	1+0	1	1+0	0
	DF	(Scotland) SCO	Darren McCormack	0	0	0+0	0	0+0	0	0+0	0	0+0	0
	DF	(Scotland) SCO	Gary Miller	43	1	35+0	1	4+0	0	2+1	0	1+0	0
	DF	(Scotland) SCO	Scott Morrison	27	1	22+1	0	3+0	0	0+0	0	1+0	1
	MF	(Scotland) SCO	Richard Brittain	41	11	33+1	9	3+0	2	3+0	0	1+0	0
	MF	(Scotland) SCO	Mark Corcoran	38	0	7+24	0	2+1	0	2+1	0	0+1	0
	MF	(Scotland) SCO	Marc Fitzpatrick	17	0	13+0	0	1+0	0	3+0	0	0+0	0
	MF	(Scotland) SCO	Rocco Quinn	32	3	16+11	3	1+2	0	2+0	0	0+0	0
	MF	(Scotland) SCO	Alex Cooper	2	0	0+0	0	0+2	0	0+0	0	0+0	0
	MF	(Scotland) SCO	Stuart Kettlewell	32	5	26+1	5	3+0	0	1+1	0	0+0	0
	MF	(Scotland) SCO	Russell Duncan	7	0	0+4	0	1+0	0	1+0	0	0+1	0
	MF	(Scotland) SCO	Paul Lawson	37	3	30+2	2	2+0	1	2+0	0	1+0	0
	MF	(Scotland) SCO	Iain Vigurs	34	7	26+3	5	3+0	2	1+0	0	1+0	0
	FW	(Northern Ireland) NIR	Sam Morrow	13	4	4+7	3	1+1	1	0+0	0	0+0	0
	FW	(Scotland) SCO	Steven Craig	31	6	8+17	4	3+0	1	1+1	1	1+0	0
	FW	(Scotland) SCO	Michael Gardyne	40	17	29+4	12	3+0	4	2+1	1	1+0	0
	FW	(Scotland) SCO	Garry Wood	0	0	0+0	0	0+0	0	0+0	0	0+0	0
	FW	(Republic of Ireland) IRL	Kurtis Byrne	21	3	1+12	1	0+4	2	1+2	0	0+1	0
	FW	(Scotland) SCO	Colin McMenamin	39	20	33+0	19	2+0	0	2+1	1	1+0	0

=== Disciplinary record ===
Includes all competitive matches.

Last updated 5 May 2012

Nation	Position	Name	Scottish First Division		Scottish Cup		League Cup		Challenge Cup		Total	
Nation	Position	Name	Booked	Sent off (straight red)	Booked	Sent off (straight red)	Booked	Sent off (straight red)	Booked	Sent off (straight red)	Booked	Sent off (straight red)
(Scotland)	GK	Joe Malin	0	0	0	0	0	0	0	0	0	0
(Scotland)	GK	Michael Fraser	0	0	0	0	0	0	0	0	0	0
(Scotland)	DF	Scott Boyd	4	0	0	0	0	0	0	0	4	0
(Scotland)	DF	Grant Munro	1	0	0	0	0	0	0	0	1	0
(Northern Ireland)	DF	Johnny Flynn	0	1	0	0	0	0	0	0	0	1
(Scotland)	DF	Darren McCormack	0	0	0	0	0	0	0	0	0	0
(Scotland)	DF	Gary Miller	4	1	1	0	0	0	1	0	6	1
(Scotland)	DF	Scott Morrison	0	0	0	0	0	0	0	0	0	0
(Scotland)	MF	Richard Brittain	7	0	0	0	0	0	0	0	7	0
(Scotland)	MF	Mark Corcoran	2	0	0	0	1	0	0	0	3	0
(Scotland)	MF	Marc Fitzpatrick	2	0	1	0	0	0	0	0	3	0
(Scotland)	MF	Rocco Quinn	5	1	0	0	1	0	0	0	6	1
(Scotland)	MF	Alex Cooper	0	0	0	0	0	0	0	0	0	0
(Scotland)	MF	Stuart Kettlewell	7	1	1	0	0	0	0	0	8	1
(Scotland)	MF	Russell Duncan	0	0	0	0	0	0	0	0	0	0
(Scotland)	MF	Paul Lawson	6	0	0	0	0	0	0	0	6	0
(Scotland)	MF	Iain Vigurs	10	0	2	0	0	0	0	0	12	0
(Northern Ireland)	FW	Sam Morrow	0	0	0	0	0	0	0	0	0	0
(Scotland)	FW	Steven Craig	0	1	0	0	0	0	0	0	0	1
(Scotland)	FW	Michael Gardyne	4	0	0	0	0	0	0	0	4	0
(Scotland)	FW	Garry Wood	0	0	0	0	0	0	0	0	0	0
(Republic of Ireland)	FW	Kurtis Byrne	2	0	0	0	0	0	0	0	2	0
(Scotland)	FW	Colin McMenamin	6	0	0	0	2	0	0	0	8	0

=== Awards ===
Last updated 27 May 2012

Nation	Name	Award	Month
(Scotland)	Derek Adams	First Division Manager of the Month (shared)	October
(Scotland)	Grant Munro	Player of the Month (shared)	October
(Scotland)	Derek Adams	First Division Manager of the Month	March
(Scotland)	Richard Brittain	Player of the Month	March
(Scotland)	Colin McMenamin	First Division Player of the Year	IRN-BRU SFL End of Season Awards
(Scotland)	Derek Adams	First Division Manager of the Season	IRN-BRU SFL End of Season Awards
(Scotland)	Derek Adams	Phenomenal Achievement of the Season	IRN-BRU SFL End of Season Awards
(Scotland)	Ross County	Team of the Season	IRN-BRU SFL End of Season Awards
(Scotland)	Derek Adams	PFA Scotland Manager of the Year	PFA Scotland Awards 2012

== League table ==
Pos	Team	Pld	W	D	L	GF	GA	GD	Pts	Promotion, qualification or relegation
1	Ross County (C, P)	36	22	13	1	72	32	+40	79	Promotion to the Premier League
2	Dundee (P)	36	15	10	11	53	43	+10	55 (Note: Dundee were chosen to take the place of Rangers.)	Promotion to the Premier League
3	Falkirk	36	13	13	10	53	48	+5	52	
4	Hamilton Academical	36	14	7	15	55	56	−1	49	
5	Livingston	36	13	9	14	56	54	+2	48	

Source: SPFL Archive
Rules for classification: 1) points; 2) goal difference; 3) number of goals scored.
(C) Champions; (P) Promoted

== See also ==
- List of Ross County F.C. seasons

== Transfers ==
=== Players in ===
Player	From	Fee
(Scotland) Colin McMenamin	(Scotland) Queen of the South	Free
(Scotland) Grant Munro	(Scotland) Inverness Caledonian Thistle	Free
(Scotland) Michael Fraser	(Malta) Birkirkara	Free
(Republic of Ireland) Kurtis Byrne	(Scotland) Hibernian	Free
(Scotland) Russell Duncan	(Scotland) Inverness Caledonian Thistle	Free
(Northern Ireland) Sam Morrow	(England) Tranmere Rovers	Free
(Scotland) Rocco Quinn	(Scotland) Queen of the South	Free
(Scotland) Alex Cooper	(England) Liverpool	Free
(Scotland) David McNamee	(Scotland) Aberdeen	Free

=== Players out ===
Player	To	Fee
(Scotland) Paul di Giacomo	(Scotland) Greenock Morton	Free
(Scotland) Andrew Barrowman	(Scotland) Dunfermline Athletic	Free
(Scotland) Steven Milne	(Scotland) Dundee	Free
(Northern Ireland) Michael McGovern	(Scotland) Falkirk	Free
(Scotland) Darren Smith	(Scotland) Stirling Albion	Free
(Scotland) Darren McCormack	(Scotland) East Fife	Free
(Scotland) Archie MacPhee	(Scotland) Elgin City	Loan
(Scotland) Garry Wood	(Scotland) Peterhead	Loan
(Scotland) Steven Ross	(Scotland) Brora Rangers	Loan
(Scotland) Steven Ross	(Scotland) Forres Mechanics	Loan
(Scotland) Garry Wood	(Scotland) Montrose	Free
(Scotland) Russell Duncan	(Scotland) Peterhead	Loan
(Scotland) Alex Cooper	(Scotland) Elgin City	Loan
