= Steven Ross (footballer) =

Scottish footballer

Personal information
- Date of birth: 29 August 1993 (age 33)
- Place of birth: Inverness, Scotland
- Height: 6 ft 0 in (1.83 m)
- Position: Striker

Senior career*
Years	Team	Apps	(Gls)
2011–2015	Ross County	25	(1)
2011	→ Brora Rangers (loan)		
2012	→ Forres Mechanics (loan)		
2014	→ Brora Rangers (loan)		
2015–2016	Dumbarton	5	(0)
2016	Elgin City	13	(0)
2016–2017	Brora Rangers		
2017–2025	Buckie Thistle		
2019	→ Clachnacuddin (loan)		
- * Club domestic league appearances and goals as of 14:48, 31 May 2026 (UTC)

Steven Ross (born 29 August 1993) is a Scottish professional footballer who most recently played for Buckie Thistle as a striker.

== Career ==
=== Ross County ===
A member of Ross County's youth squad, Ross was sent out on loan during the 2011–12 season to Highland Football League sides Brora Rangers and Forres Mechanics to gain first team experience. On his return from his loans he signed a one-year contract extension, extending his stay until May 2013.

On 29 September 2012, he made his first team debut, coming on as an 87th-minute substitute in a Scottish Premier League match against St Mirren, replacing Iain Vigurs in a 5–4 defeat. His first start came on 20 October, in a 3–2 win over Hibernian. Ross scored his first goal in senior football on 3 November 2012, in a 2–1 win against Aberdeen.

On 31 January 2014, Ross returned for a second loan spell at Brora Rangers.

He joined Dumbarton on 26 August 2015 He was allowed to leave the club at the end of his short-term deal after travelling became an issue.

=== Highland League ===
On 21 September 2016, Ross signed for Highland League club Brora Rangers on a one-year contract. Despite scoring 24 goals in the 2016–17 season, he left the club for Buckie Thistle in June 2017.

== Career statistics ==
As of 17 March 2015

Club statistics
Club	Season	League		League Cup		Scottish Cup		Other		Total	
Club	Season	App	Goals	App	Goals	App	Goals	App	Goals	App	Goals
Ross County	2011–12	0	0	0	0	0	0	0	0	0	0
Ross County	2012–13	10	1	0	0	0	0	0	0	10	1
Ross County	2013–14	10	0	0	0	0	0	0	0	10	0
Ross County	2014–15	5	0	0	0	0	0	0	0	5	0
Total		25	1	0	0	0	0	0	0	25	1

== Personal life ==
His brother Ryan Ross is also a footballer with Ross County.
