= Richard Brittain =

Scottish footballer (born 1983)

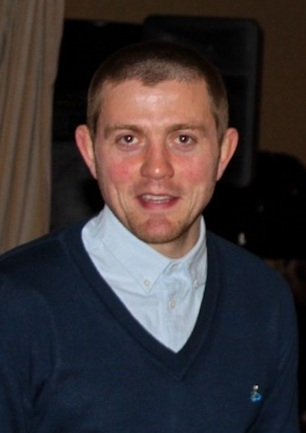
- Richard Brittain (2010)

Personal information
- Date of birth: 24 September 1983 (age 43)
- Place of birth: Bathgate, Scotland
- Position: Midfielder

Team information
- Current team: Bonar Bridge

Youth career
- Hutchison Vale

Senior career*
Years	Team	Apps	(Gls)
2002–2006	Livingston	65	(4)
2003	→ Raith Rovers (loan)	13	(1)
2006–2008	St Mirren	37	(1)
2008–2015	Ross County	222	(42)
2015–2016	Brora Rangers		
2024–	Bonar Bridge		

Managerial career
- 2015–2016: Brora Rangers
- * Club domestic league appearances and goals

Richard Brittain (born 24 September 1983) is a Scottish former professional footballer for North Caledonian League club Bonar Bridge. He spent the 2015–16 season as manager of Brora Rangers after a short playing spell at the club. He started his career at Livingston and also played for Raith Rovers, St Mirren and Ross County.

== Playing career ==
=== Livingston ===
Born in Bathgate, Scotland, Brittain started out his youth career at Hutchison Vale before joining Almondvale side Livingston when he was twelve years old. Brittain made his debut for the club, coming on as a 85th-minute substitute, in a 4–1 win against Albion Rovers in the third round of the Scottish Cup. He played two more league matches later in the 2001–02 season, playing twice against Celtic. The following 2002–03 season saw Brittain became a victim of a team-mate dispute after new signing Sergio Berti spat at him during a pre-season friendly, leading to Berti being sacked by Livingston, although this decision was later overturned by the Scottish Football Association following an appeal by Berti, resulting in the club paying £250,000 plus compensation. Following this, he played three times for Livingston in the 2002–03 season.

On 19 July 2003, Brittain was loaned out to Raith Rovers. He made his debut for the club, starting the whole game, in a 5–2 win against East Stirlingshire in the second round of the Scottish League Cup. Brittain scored his first goal for Raith Rovers in a follow–up match, in a 1–1 draw against St Mirren. He went on to make thirteen appearances and scoring once for the Rovers before returning to his parent club. Shortly after returning to his parent club, Brittain made his first appearance of the season for Livingston, coming on as a late substitute, in a 2–2 draw against Dunfermline Athletic. However, he was cup-tied for Livingston's victory in the 2004 Scottish League Cup Final, having previously played in the competition during his loan spell at Raith. At the end of the 2003–04 season, Brittain made fourteen appearances in all competitions.

Brittain had to wait until on 24 October 2004 to make his first appearance of the 2004–05 season, coming on as a second-half substitute, in a 4–2 loss against Celtic. Following this, he earned four starts in the next four matches between 27 October 2004 and 20 November 2004. In a match against Aberdeen on 19 February 2005, however, Brittain suffered an injury in the 20th minute and was substituted, as Livingston loss 2–0 and his last appearance of the season. At the end of the 2004–05 season, he went on to make thirteen appearances in all competitions.

In the opening game of the 2005–06 season, Brittain received a straight red card for a foul on Ian Murray, in a 3–0 loss against Rangers. After serving a one match suspension, he made his return to the starting line–up, in a 3–0 win against Hibernian on 13 August 2005. Following this, Brittain became a first team regular, playing in the midfield position. On 7 January 2006, he scored his first goal of the season, in a 1–1 draw against Alloa Athletic in the third round of the Scottish Cup. On 5 March 2006, Brittain scored his second league goal of the season, in a 3–2 loss against Hearts. He scored on 8 April 2006, 15 April 2006 and 22 April 2006 against Inverness Caledonian Thistle, Dundee United and Dunfermline Athletic respectively. At the end of the 2005–06 season, Brittain made forty–one appearances and scoring five times in all competitions.

Following this, Brittain was offered a new contract by Livingston. While being offered a new contract, he had interest from French clubs Montpellier HSC and RC Strasbourg. By the time Brittain departed Livingston, he played 65 league games and scoring four goals.

=== St Mirren ===
On 2 July 2006, Brittain chose to sign for Scottish Premier League side St Mirren on a free transfer.

He made his debut for the club, coming on as a 75th-minute substitute, in a 2–1 win against Inverness CT in the opening game of the season. Since the start of the 2006–07 season, Brittain became a first team regular, playing in the midfield position. After missing one match with an injury, he returned to the first team, coming on as a 63rd-minute substitute, and set up a goal for Mark Corcoran, in a 1–1 draw against Kilmarnock on 9 December 2006. On 30 December 2006, Brittain scored his first St Mirren goal, in a 1–1 draw against Rangers, which was his only league goal for the Saints. He then scored his second goal of the season, in a 3–2 loss against Dundee United in the third round of the Scottish Cup. Following this, Brittain said the club can avoid relegation and retain their Scottish Premier League status. However, he suffered an injury and was out for the rest of the 2006–07 season. While on absent, Brittain successfully predicted that St Mirren avoided relegation by four points. At the end of the 2006–07 season, he went on to make thirty–three appearances and scoring two times in all competitions.

In the opening game of the 2007–08 season, Brittain recovered from his injury and made his first appearance of the season, coming on as a 57th-minute substitute, in a 1–0 loss against Motherwell. However, he suffered broken metatarsal bone that he snapped while running in training and was out for three months. By April, Brittain recovered from his injury and made his return to training. On 5 April 2008, he made his return from injury, coming on as a 50th-minute substitute, in a 2–0 loss against Hibernian. At the end of the 2007–08 season, Brittain made six appearances in all competitions. Following this, he was released by St Mirren.

=== Ross County ===
On 5 June 2008, Brittain signed for Scottish First Division side Ross County. Upon his move to Ross County, Brittain was reunited with Derek Adams, the club's manager, the two having played together while at Livingston.

Brittain made his debut in the opening game of the season, starting the whole game, as Ross County loss 2–1 against Dundee. A month later, on 13 September 2008, he scored his first goal for the club, in a 2–1 loss against St Johnstone. Brittain started in the Scottish Challenge Cup final against Airdrie United and started the whole game all the way to penalties following a 2–2 draw, as Ross County loss 3–2 on penalties. In another follow–up match against Airdrie United, he scored his second goal of the season, in a 2–0 win to help the club gain revenge. After missing four matches, Brittain returned to the starting line–up, in a 1–1 draw against Greenock Morton on 21 March 2009. In a follow–up match against Dunfermline Athletic, he scored his third goal of the season, in a 2–1 win. However, in a match against Clyde on 11 April 2009, Brittain received a straight red card in the 30th minute for a foul on Marvyn Wilson, as the club drew 0–0. After serving a two match suspension, he returned to the starting line–up against Livingston on 2 May 2009 and set up a goal for Steven Craig, in a 2–2 draw. On the last game of the season against Greenock Morton, Brittain scored his fourth goal of the season, in a 2–0 win. Having become a first team regular, playing in the midfield position in his first season at Ross County, he made thirty-eight appearances and scoring five in all competitions.

In the 2009–10 season, Brittain continued to regain his first team place, playing in the midfield position. He scored on 25 August 2009, 29 August 2009, 12 September 2009 and 19 September 2009 against Hamilton Academical, Inverness Caledonian Thistle, Queen of the South and Ayr United respectively. However, during a match against Dundee, on 26 September 2009, Brittain suffered a leg injury and was substituted in the 12th minute, as Ross County loss 2–0. But he quickly recovered and returned to the starting line–up, in a 1–0 win against Greenock Morton on 10 October 2009. He scored on 8 December 2009, 12 December 2009 and 19 December 2009 against Greenock Morton, Dunfermline Athletic and Airdrie United respectively. The January transfer window saw Brittain linked a move away from Ross County, but he ended up staying at the club by signing a new contract. On 6 February 2010, Brittain scored and set up two goals, in a 9–0 win against Stirling Albion in the last 16 of Scottish Cup. A month later, on 6 March 2010, he scored his tenth goal of the season from a penalty score, which was the only goal of the game against Raith Rovers. Brittain captained Ross County through victories in The Scottish Cup against SPL sides Hibernian and Celtic. The famous 2–0 victory over Celtic at Hampden Park in the semi-final earned Ross County a place in the Scottish Cup Final, the club's first ever major final. He dedicated the win against Celtic to his late friend Graham Heggie. After missing two matches due to suspension, Brittain returned to the starting line–up as captain against Dundee United, where Ross County eventually lost 3–0. For his performance, newspaper Daily Record said about his performance: "He put in some decent tackles from the centre of midfield but wasn't on the ball often enough to make a difference and when he was in possession he didn't always have the options that were available to United as they won the battle for control in central areas." At the end of the 2009–10 season, Brittain went on to make forty–eight appearances and scoring eleven times in all competitions.

Since the start of the 2010–11 season, Brittain continued to remain in the first team, playing in the midfield position as Ross County’s captain. He then scored his first goal of the season, in a 3–3 draw against St. Mirren in the second round of the Scottish League Cup, but the club was eliminated on penalties. Brittain led Ross County to the Scottish Challenge Cup final by helping the club beat Partick Thistle 4–3 on penalties following a 2–2 draw. He then scored his second goal of the season, in a 2–1 win against Falkirk on 5 March 2011. He started in the final as captain and led Ross County to a 2–0 win against Queen of the South in the of. Brittain then scored his fourth goal of the season, in a 2–1 loss against Cowdenbeath on 5 April 2011. However, he missed the next two matches, due to picking up yellow cards. Brittain returned to the starting line–up, in a 1–0 win against Queen of the South on 26 April 2011. At the end of the 2010–11 season, Brittain went on to make forty–five appearances and scoring four times in all competitions.

At the start of the 2011–12 season, Brittain continued to remain in the first team, playing in the midfield position as Ross County’s captain. He scored on 10 September 2011 and 17 September 2011 against Partick Thistle and Livingston respectively. Two weeks later, on 1 October 2011, Brittain scored his third goal of the season, in a 4–0 win against Ayr United. After missing one match, he returned to the starting line–up, in a 1–1 draw against Falkirk on 26 December 2011. On 7 January 2012, Brittain scored his fourth goal of the season, and provided a hat–trick assists in a 7–0 win against Stenhousemuir in the fourth round of the Scottish Cup. A month later on 4 February 2012, he scored his fifth goal of the season, in a 1–1 draw against St. Mirren in the fifth round of the Scottish Cup. Brittain scored his first hat–trick of his professional football career, in a 3–2 win against Ayr United on 29 February 2012. He then scored on 13 March 2012 and 17 March 2012 against Greenock Morton and Falkirk respectively. Throughout the 2011–12 season, Brittain captained Ross County through a post war Scottish record of 40 league games undefeated, over a full calendar year. This run helped Ross County win the Scottish First Division by a record margin of 24 points and promotion to the Scottish Premier League for the first time in the club's history when he scored twice in a 5–1 win against Hamilton Academical on 28 April 2012. After the match, he would describe as his "greatest day of my career". At the end of the 2011–12 season, Brittain went on to make forty–two appearances and scoring twelve times in all competitions. Following this, he signed a one–year contract with Ross County.

In the opening game of the 2012–13 season, Brittain continued to remain as Ross County’s captain, where he led the club's first league match in the top-flight to a 0–0 draw with Motherwell. Brittain scored on 18 August 2012 and 25 August 2012 against Celtic (Ross County’s first goal in the top-flight) and Dundee (the club’s first win in the top-flight) respectively. Ross County’s unbeaten continued until their loss against St Johnstone on 22 September 2012. After the match, he was criticised by St Johnstone manager Steve Lomas, calling him a "cheat", which led to Lomas receiving a match ban. In a match against Hibernian on 20 October 2012, Brittain provided a double assists, in a 3–2 win. In a follow–up match against Hearts, he scored his third goal of the season, in a 2–2 draw. In another follow–up match against Aberdeen, Brittain, once again, provided a double assists, in a 2–1 win. In the fourth round of the Scottish Cup, he scored his fourth goal of the season, in a 3–3 draw against Inverness Caledonian Thistle. Brittain scored on 26 December 2012, 19 January 2013 and 26 January 2013 against Hibernian, St. Mirren and Dundee United respectively. It was announced on 9 January 2013 he agreed to join St Johnstone on a two-year deal after signing a pre-contract with the Saints. A month later on 23 February 2013, Brittain scored his eighth goal of the season, in a 3–0 win against Motherwell. However, he was suspended for two matches. But on 30 March 2013, Brittain returned to the starting line–up, in a 1–0 loss against Kilmarnock. On 17 April 2013, he reversed his move to St Johnstone and wanted to stay at Ross County, who then registered him as their player preventing St Johnstone from doing so. When Ross County and St Johnstone played on 21 April 2013, Brittain received jeers from St Johnstone fans, though he received praise from Ross County fans. During the match, Brittain scored two penalties in a 2–2 draw. After the match, manager Adams praised Brittain's performance in the match. However, during a 2–0 loss against Motherwell on 12 May 2013, he suffered a knee injury and was substituted in the 56th minute. After the match, Brittain missed the rest of the 2012–13 season, due to a knee injury. At the end of the 2012–13 season, he went on to make thirty–six appearances and scoring ten times in all competitions. On 27 June 2013 St Johnstone announced they had reached agreement with Ross County to transfer Brittain back to them for a fee of £40,000. This remains the highest sum St.Johnstone have received for a player that did not actually play for them. Ross County though, have denied any transfer fee was paid, they say a donation was made to St Johnstone's community programme.

At the start of the 2013–14 season, Brittain missed two games at the start of the season after being suspended over an incident in a pre-season friendly match. After serving his two match suspension, he made his first appearance of the season, starting the whole game, in a 4–0 loss against St Johnstone on 19 August 2013. During the match, Brittain was booed by the Saints supporters, who still resented him for his botch move to the club. He scored on 24 August 2013 and 27 August 2013 against St Mirren and Stranraer respectively. Four weeks later on 21 September 2013 against Hearts, Brittain provided an assist for Melvin de Leeuw to equalised and in return, de Leeuw then provided assist for Brittain to score the winning goal, in a 2–1 win. In the return game against Hearts on 23 November 2013, Brittain was then sent-off for second bookable offense, which the game ended a 2–2 draw. After serving a one match suspension, he returned to the starting line–up, in a 1–0 loss against Hibernian in the fourth round of the Scottish Cup. On 11 January 2014, Brittain provided a hat-trick assists, in a 3–3 draw against Partick Thistle. A month later on 16 February 2014, Brittain scored his fifth goal of the season, in a 2–1 loss against Hibernian. Two weeks later on 1 March 2014 in a return game against Partick Thistle, he scored his sixth goal of the season, which they drew 1–1. His seventh goal of the season came on 26 April 2014 against Kilmarnock, scoring from a penalty spot, in a 2–1 win. On 6 May 2014, Brittain scored his eighth goal of the season, scoring from a penalty spot, as Ross County beat Hibernian 1–0, a result that confirmed the club's place in the Scottish Premiership for another season. Despite missing a match on the last game of the 2013–14 season, he went on to make thirty–six appearances and scoring eight times in all competitions.

At the start of the 2014–15 season, Brittain continued to remain in the first team, where he began to rotate between the right–back position, right–midfield position and centre–midfield position. Brittain also continued to remain as Ross County’s captain. By November, he suffered a foot injury that saw him out for one match. Brittain previously suffered a foot injury the previous month but requested his surgery to be delayed. He returned to the starting line–up in the right–back position, in a 3–0 win against Kilmarnock on 8 November 2014. Despite facing competitions and his own injury concern, he continued to remain in the first team for the next two months. However, he suffered a torn hamstring that saw him out for four months. By April, Brittain began a full recovery and returned to training. On 16 May 2015, he made his return from injury, coming on as a 86th-minute substitute, in a 2–1 win against Hamilton Academical. On the last game of the season, Brittain made his last appearance for the club, coming on as a 78th-minute substitute, in a 2–1 win against Kilmarnock. At the end of the 2014–15 season, he made twenty–four appearances in all competitions. Following this, he was released by the "Staggies".

=== Brora Rangers ===
Brittain signed for Highland League club Brora Rangers during the 2015 close season, while at the same time, starting a new career in the construction industry.

He made his debut for the club, coming on as a 86th-minute substitute, in a 1–0 loss against Alloa Athletic in the first round of the Scottish League Cup. He scored his first gaol for Brora Rangers, in a 2–1 win against Fraserburgh on 29 August 2015. Two weeks later on 9 September 2015, Brittain scored his second goal for the club, in a 7–1 win against Nairn County. A month later on 3 October 2015, he scored his third goal for Brora Rangers, in a 1–1 draw against Turriff United. Brittain scored on 5 December 2015 and 12 December 2015 against Rothes and Cove Rangers respectively.

=== Bonar Bridge ===
In August 2024, after a stint in the Inverness amateur leagues, Brittain returned to senior football with North Caledonian League club Bonar Bridge for the season. He also been involved as part of the club’s coaching staff.

== Coaching career ==
Following the sacking of Derek Adams, Brittain was assigned to assist Steven Ferguson, who took charge as the caretaker of Ross County. He soon received his UEFA Pro License, both B and A badge.

=== Brora Rangers ===
On 16 July 2015, Brittain was appointed player-manager of Highland Football League side Brora Rangers, succeeding Davie Kirkwood as manager. Four days later on 20 July 2015, he managed his first match as manager of Brora Rangers, in a 0–0 draw against Clyde.

Brittain resigned as manager in April 2016 due to "occupational activities and family commitments," but said he hoped to continue as a player at the club. At the time of his sacking, he led the club become the favourites to win the Highland Football League. Ultimately, the club ended up finishing third place in the league.

=== Ross County ===
After leaving Brora Rangers, Brittain soon returned to Ross County as part of the club’s youth development set-up. In April 2018, he was appointed as Ross County’s reserve team manager.

Britain was appointed assistant manager of Ross County on 10 June 2020 where he would work under his former teammate Stuart Kettlewell. When Kettlewell was suspended for three months, Brittain took over the dugout for the club’s matches. After Kettlewell was sacked by Ross County, he continued in his role under John Hughes. Brittain left this role in June 2021 after the appointment of Malky Mackay as Ross County manager.

== Personal life ==
In 2012, Brittain became a father after his wife gave birth to a baby daughter. Starting a family "made him prioritise his family over his career".

Brittain's rejection of a move to St Johnstone in 2013 caused him to receive hate messages on Twitter. His wife, Diane, had condemned the abuse the family was receiving. Brittain stated he stayed at Ross County for family reasons.

== Career statistics ==
Appearances and goals by club, season and competition
Club	Season	League			National cup		League cup		Other (Note: Appearances in the Scottish Challenge Cup)		Total	
Club	Season	Division	Apps	Goals	Apps	Goals	Apps	Goals	Apps	Goals	Apps	Goals
Livingston	2001–02	Scottish Premier League	2	0	1	0	0	0	0	0	3	0
Livingston	2002–03	Scottish Premier League	3	0	0	0	0	0	0	0	3	0
Livingston	2003–04	Scottish Premier League	12	0	2	0	0	0	0	0	14	0
Livingston	2004–05	Scottish Premier League	13	0	1	0	1	0	0	0	15	0
Livingston	2005–06	Scottish Premier League	35	4	2	1	4	0	0	0	41	5
Livingston	Total		65	4	6	1	5	0	0	0	76	5
Raith Rovers (loan)	2003–04	Scottish First Division	13 (Note: Includes three matches not recorded on Soccerbase or Soccerway. "Raith (0) 0 Queen of South (0) 1". The Telegraph. 9 November 2003. Archived from the original on 29 February 2016., "Ross County (1) 3 Raith (0) 2". The Telegraph. 23 November 2003. Archived from the original on 29 February 2016. & "Raith Rovers 1–4 St Johnstone". ESPN FC. 29 November 2003.)	1	0	0	1	0	4 (Note: Includes one match not recorded on Soccerbase or Soccerway. "Raith Rovers 3–2 St Mirren". ESPN FC. 26 August 2003.)	0	18	1
St Mirren	2006–07	Scottish Premier League	31	1	1	1	1	0	0	0	33	2
St Mirren	2007–08	Scottish Premier League	6	0	0	0	1	0	0	0	7	0
St Mirren	Total		37	1	1	1	2	0	0	0	40	2
Ross County	2008–09	Scottish First Division	30	4 (Note: Includes one match not recorded on Soccerbase or Soccerway. "Dumbarton 1–2 Ross County". BBC Sport. 15 December 2008.)	3	1	1	0	4 (Note: Includes one match not recorded on Soccerbase or Soccerway. "Clyde 0–1 Ross County". BBC Sport. 7 September 2008.)	0	38	5
Ross County	2009–10	Scottish First Division	34	9	7	1	3	1	4	0	48	11
Ross County	2010–11	Scottish First Division	34	3	3	0	3	1	5	0	45	4
Ross County	2011–12	Scottish First Division	35	10	3	2	3	0	1	0	42	12
Ross County	2012–13	Scottish Premier League	34	9	2	1	0	0	0	0	36	10
Ross County	2013–14	Scottish Premiership	34	7	1	0	1	1	0	0	36	8
Ross County	2014–15	Scottish Premiership	21	0	1	0	2	0	0	0	24	0
Ross County	Total		222	42	20	5	13	3	14	0	269	50
Brora Rangers	2015–16	Highland Football League	—	—	1	0	—	—	1	0	2	0
Career total			337	48	28	7	21	3	19	0	405	58

== Honours ==
=== Player ===
Ross County

- Scottish Challenge Cup: 2010–11

Individual

- Scottish Football League Player of the Month: March 2012

=== Manager ===
Brora Rangers

- Highland League Cup: 2015–16
