= Ben Frempah =

Italian footballer

Personal information
- Full name: Benedict Frempah
- Date of birth: 3 April 1995 (age 31)
- Place of birth: Sassuolo, Italy
- Height: 6 ft 3 in (1.91 m)
- Position: Defender

Senior career*
| Years | Team | Apps | (Gls) |
| 2012–2013 | Fisher | 31 | (1) |
| 2013–2014 | Cray Wanderers | 8 | (1) |
| 2013–2014 | Leicester City | 0 | (0) |
| 2014–2015 | Ross County | 6 | (0) |
| 2015–2016 | Hendon | 1 | (0) |
| 2017–2018 | Solihull Moors | 1 | (0) |
| 2018 | Guiseley | 3 | (0) |
| 2019 | Wycombe Wanderers | 1 | (0) |
| 2019–2020 | Wingate & Finchley | 5 | (0) |
| 2020–2021 | Ebbsfleet United | 5 | (0) |
| 2021 | Hayes & Yeading United | 43 | (3) |
| 2022 | Enfield Town | 0 | (0) |
| 2022 | Cheshunt | 2 | (1) |
| 2022–2023 | Leatherhead | 26 | (1) |
| 2023–2025 | Wingate & Finchley | 81 | (7) |
| 2025–2026 | Dartford | 10 | (0) |
| 2026 | → Wingate & Finchley (loan) | 14 | (0) |
- * Club domestic league appearances and goals as of 17:10, 11 May 2026 (UTC)

Benedict Frempah (born 3 April 1995) is an Italian footballer who plays as a defender. He is currently a free agent.

== Career ==
Frempah played for non-league English club Cray Wanderers as a 17-year-old. He then moved seven levels up the English football league system when he signed for Leicester City. Frempah signed for Scottish Premiership club Ross County in July 2014. He made his professional debut on 13 August 2014, in a 4–0 defeat against Partick Thistle. Frempah was one of 14 players released by Ross County at the end of the 2014–15 season. He played briefly for Isthmian League club Hendon early in the 2015–16 season.

In December 2017, Frempah joined National League side Solihull Moors on a permanent deal. In March 2019, Wycombe Wanderers announced they had added Frempah to their squad on non-contract terms for the remainder of the season. After being released from Wycombe Wanderers at the end of the season, Frempah returned to non-league football and joined Wingate & Finchley.

He joined Ebbsfleet United in August 2020.
