= Alex Cooper (footballer) =

Scottish footballer

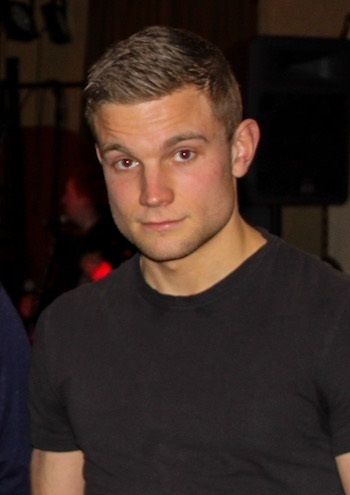
- Alex Cooper, in 2010

Personal information
- Date of birth: 4 November 1991 (age 35)
- Place of birth: Inverness, Scotland
- Height: 1.80 m (5 ft 11 in)
- Position: Left-back

Team information
- Current team: Brora Rangers

Youth career
- –2007: Ross County
- 2007–2011: Liverpool

Senior career*
Years	Team	Apps	(Gls)
2011–2014	Ross County	32	(1)
2011–2012	→ Elgin City (loan)	8	(0)
2014–2016	Falkirk	24	(3)
2016	St Mirren	12	(1)
2016–2017	Cheltenham Town	1	(0)
2017	East Fife	6	(0)
2017–2018	Inverness Caledonian Thistle	6	(1)
2018–2019	Fresno	45	(6)
2020–2021	Sligo Rovers	12	(1)
2021–2022	Queen of the South	20	(2)
2022–2023	Gefle IF	14	(1)

International career^{‡}
2007–2008	Scotland U17	7	(0)
- * Club domestic league appearances and goals as of 11:30, 19 May 2023 (UTC) ‡ National team caps and goals as of 22:00, 29 April 2022 (UTC)

Alex Cooper (born 4 November 1991) is a Scottish footballer who plays as a left-back.

Cooper has previously played for Ross County, Elgin City (loan spell), Falkirk, St Mirren, Cheltenham Town, East Fife, Inverness Caledonian Thistle, Fresno, Sligo Rovers, Queen of the South and Gefle IF.

Cooper is also a former Liverpool youth player and also a former Scotland U17 youth international.

== Career ==
=== Club career ===
Cooper began his playing career with Ross County's youth team. He immediately showed signs of great potential, sparking interest from several major clubs. At 14, he was invited to take part in a tournament in Switzerland with Jose Mourinho's Chelsea. and to train with both Celtic and Rangers. At the age of sixteen he went on a week-long trial to Liverpool which was cut short by injury. He returned a month later for a further three-day trial playing one match after which he was offered a contract.

He joined Liverpool on 28 December 2007 for a £100,000 fee signing a three-and-a-half-year contract. After his arrival he started playing for Liverpool's Academy before progressing to the Reserve side managed by John McMahon. Cooper also played in the 2008/09 FA Youth Cup final at Anfield stadium against Arsenal for Liverpool. During his time at Merseyside he suffered numerous injuries the most severe being a broken ankle ruling him out for six months during the 2009–10 season.

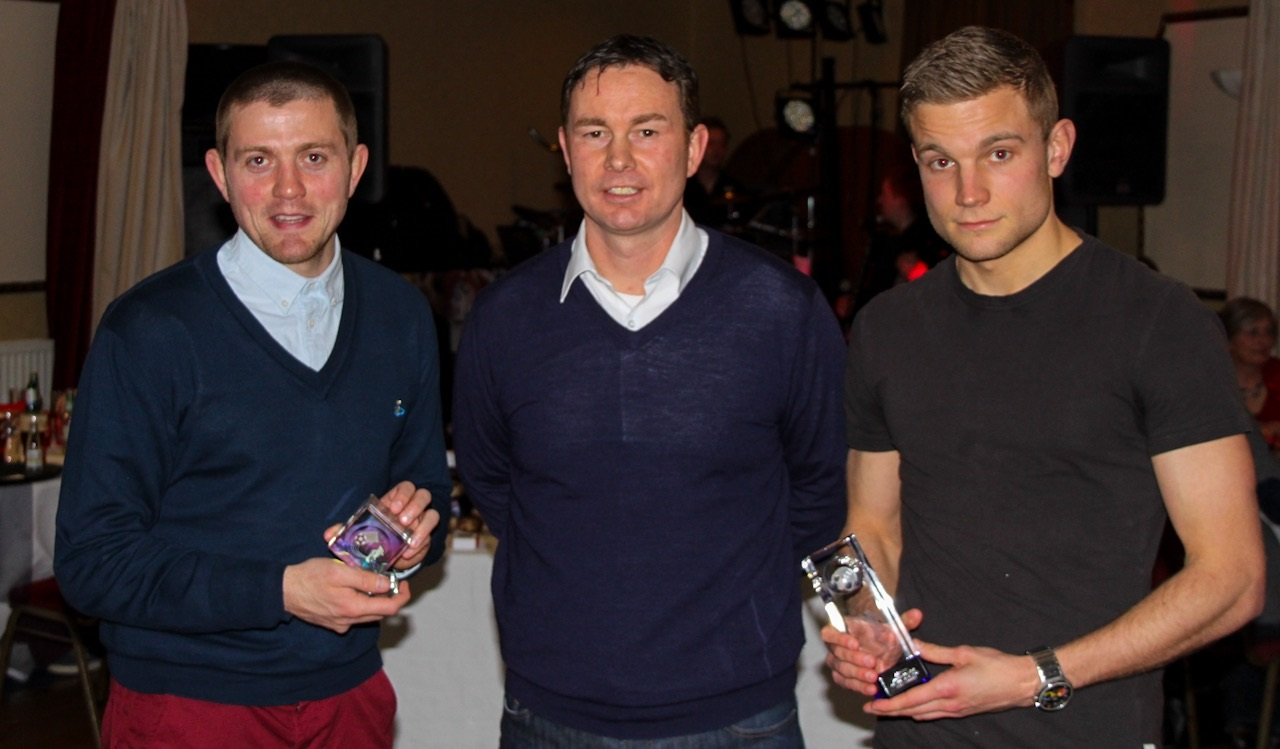
Cooper (right) winning the Young Player of the Year award at Ross County F.C.

Cooper was released by Liverpool in the summer of 2011 along with three other players following the expiration of his contract. In the wake of his release, there was interest from a number of clubs, north and south of the border and Cooper eventually re-joined Ross County on 18 October 2011 until the end of the season after nearly a four-year absence from Dingwall. He appeared on the bench a day later for County's Scottish Cup tie against Albion Rovers but remained an unused substitute. He made his senior debut on 7 January 2012 as a substitute in a 7–0 victory against Stenhousemuir in a Scottish Cup fixture replacing teammate Paul Lawson. His next outing for County was again in the Scottish Cup, against SPL side St Mirren in a fifth round replay defeat.

On 16 March 2012, he joined Scottish Third Division side Elgin City on loan until the end of the season. He made his debut the following day, starting in a 2–2 draw with East Stirlingshire. Ross County were promoted to the Scottish Premier League with Cooper signing a new one-year contract in May 2012 keeping him at Dingwall until the end of the 2012–13 season. Cooper earned his first Scottish Premier League start against Kilmarnock in September 2012 but had to come off with another ankle injury and subsequently missed two months of action until he returned to action again in December. His performances during that season earnt him his club's Young Player of the Year award and subsequently a similar new deal for the 2013–14 season. Cooper scored his first league goal in spectacular style during the New Year's Day Derby against County's close rivals Inverness Caledonian Thistle which ultimately made the difference in a 2–1 win. At the end of the 2013–14 season, his father left his role as an assistant manager at Ross County and Cooper was among three players to be released.

On 3 July 2014, Cooper signed for Scottish Championship club Falkirk. He scored on his Falkirk debut, a 7–1 win against East Stirlingshire in the Scottish Challenge Cup. He was a substitute in the 2015 Scottish Cup Final squad.

On 29 January 2016, St Mirren signed Cooper until the end of the 2015–16 season after he was released from Falkirk. He was released by St Mirren at the end of the 2015–16 season.

On 8 October, Cooper signed for Cheltenham Town. The deal was completed in time for him to start in a match against Accrington Stanley. Cooper tore his hamstring on his Cheltenham Town debut and did not recover before the end of his contract, which led to a spell out of the professional game before he signed for Inverness Caledonian Thistle in July 2017 on a short-term contract. He was part of the Inverness team that won the 17/18 challenge cup.

On 13 March 2018, Cooper joined United Soccer League side Fresno FC as a free agent.

Cooper made 24 appearances in his first season in America and re-signed with Fresno for the 2019 USL Season. After re-signing, Head Coach Adam Smith stated "We're excited to welcome Alex back to our club after a successful first year with us. He was a key piece on both sides of the ball and we're looking forward to having him provide that spark on the left wing." In the following season, Cooper scored and assisted in the USL Championship Playoff semifinal against El Paso Locomotive FC as Fresno FC lost 3–2.

In February 2020, he signed for Irish club Sligo Rovers. In August, Cooper scored a magnificent last minute freekick which secured a 2–1 win over Waterford FC. Cooper's goal proved to be invaluable as it helped the team to secure European football for the first time since 2013.

On 9 July 2021, Cooper signed for Dumfries club Queen of the South in the Scottish Championship on a one-year contract.

Upon signing for Queen of the South, Manager Allan Johnston said, "Alex has a great left foot and is an experienced player who can play in numerous positions. With his ability to play in defence and midfield that gives us options which is exactly what we need within the squad." During his time in Dumfries, Cooper also played in the 2021/22 Scottish League Challenge Cup final, in which Queen of the South lost to Raith Rovers.

After leaving the club at the end of the 2021–22 season, he signed for Swedish side Gefle IF. After Cooper joined Gefle IF with a few months of the season left, Gefle IF went on to win the Ettan Norra title and secure promotion back to the Superettan League.

=== International career ===
Cooper made his international debut at the age of 14 and scored in a 1–1 draw for Scotland against Belgium, who had Eden Hazard playing. He represented Scotland at under-15 and under-16 levels including participation in the Victory Shield tournament. He also played for the Scotland under-17 side on seven occasions, featuring in the age group's European Championship. Cooper was involved in the UEFA under-17 European Championship in Turkey and named as a player to watch by UEFA. He signed for League of Ireland Premier Division side Sligo Rovers on 20 February 2020, turning down offers to stay in the United States for a third season, in order to be closer to his family in Scotland.

== Personal life ==
Cooper is the son of Neale Cooper, who played for Aberdeen and was the manager of Ross County.

== Career statistics ==
As of 1 May 2022

Appearances and goals by club, season and competition
Club	Season	League			National Cup		League Cup		Other		Total	
Club	Season	Division	Apps	Goals	Apps	Goals	Apps	Goals	Apps	Goals	Apps	Goals
Ross County	2011–12	Scottish Division One	0	0	2	0	0	0	0	0	2	0
Ross County	2012–13	Scottish Premier League	15	0	1	0	0	0	0	0	16	0
Ross County	2013–14	Scottish Premiership	17	1	0	0	0	0	0	0	17	1
Ross County	Ross County Total		32	1	3	0	0	0	0	0	35	1
Elgin City (loan)	2011–12	Scottish Division Three	8	0	0	0	0	0	2 (Note: Appearances in the Division Three play-offs)	0	10	0
Falkirk	2014–15	Scottish Championship	24	3	1	0	3	1	3 (Note: Appearances in the Scottish Challenge Cup)	1	31	5
Falkirk	2015–16	Scottish Championship	0	0	0	0	1	0	1	1	2	1
Falkirk	Falkirk Total		24	3	1	0	4	1	4	2	33	6
St Mirren	2015–16	Scottish Championship	12	1	0	0	0	0	0	0	12	1
Cheltenham Town	2016–17	EFL League Two	1	0	0	0	0	0	0	0	1	0
East Fife	2016–17	Scottish League One	6	0	0	0	0	0	0	0	6	0
Inverness Caledonian Thistle	2017–18	Scottish Championship	6	1	0	0	1	0	3	0	10	1
Fresno	2018	USL Championship	24	3	0	0	0	0	0	0	24	3
Fresno	2019	USL Championship	21	3	0	0	0	0	0	0	21	3
Fresno	Fresno Total		45	6	0	0	0	0	0	0	45	6
Sligo Rovers	2020	League of Ireland Premier Division	12	1	3	0	0	0	0	0	15	1
Queen of the South	2021–22	Scottish Championship	20	2	2	0	1	0	4	0	27	2
Career total			155	14	6	0	6	1	13	2	178	17
