= Melvin de Leeuw =

Dutch footballer

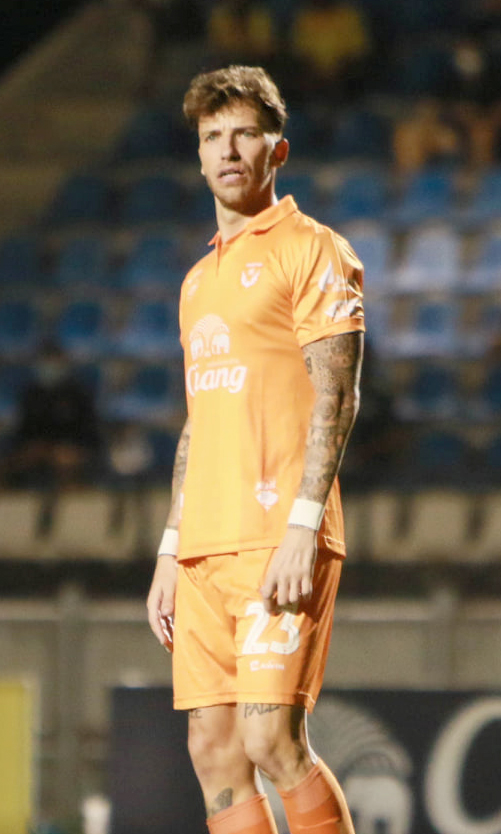
- Melvin de Leeuw playing for Sukhothai

Personal information
- Full name: Melvin Jonhannes Geradus de Leeuw
- Date of birth: 25 April 1988 (age 38)
- Place of birth: Bergen op Zoom, Netherlands
- Height: 1.83 m (6 ft 0 in)
- Position: Forward

Team information
- Current team: RKSV Halsteren
- Number: 9

Youth career
- RKSV Halsteren
- NAC Breda
- RBC Roosendaal

Senior career*
Years	Team	Apps	(Gls)
2007–2011	RBC Roosendaal	94	(22)
2011–2013	Cambuur	59	(13)
2013–2014	Ross County	39	(9)
2015	Army United	12	(3)
2016	Khon Kaen United	11	(3)
2017	Lanexang United	1	(0)
2017	Army United	4	(0)
2017–2019	Lampang	31	(11)
2020–2021	Chiangmai United	46	(19)
2022	Sukhothai	15	(7)
2022–2023	Chiangmai United	31	(8)
2023–	RKSV Halsteren		
- * Club domestic league appearances and goals as of 15 December 2024

Melvin Jonhannes Geradus de Leeuw (born 25 April 1988) is a Dutch professional footballer who plays as a forward for RKSV Halsteren.

== Career ==
=== Career in Netherlands ===
Born in Bergen op Zoom, Netherlands, De Leeuw grew up supporting Ajax and idolised Dennis Bergkamp, which implies that made De Leeuw play as a striker today. De Leeuw started his football career at RBC Roosendaal, having played at youth level for RKSV Halsteren and NAC Breda before moving to RBC Roosendaal. On November 4, 2007, he made his debut in professional football, in a league match against RKC Waalwijk, coming on as a 77th-minute substitute for Saša Stojanović in a 2–0 defeat. On 7 March 2008, De Leeuw received a red card after being booked twice, in a 2–1 win over Emmen.

In the 2008–09 season, De Leeuw was featured in the starting line-up for the first ten matches and scored his first goal, in a 2–1 loss against SC Cambuur and two weeks later, on 7 November 2008, he scored, again, in a 2–2 draw against RKC Waalwijk. During the season, he added three more goals and made twenty five appearances.

In the 2009–10 season, De Leeuw would only score three goals in thirty-two appearances in all competitions. During the 2010–11 season, he scored ten goals in thirty-two appearances in all competitions, including a brace and providing an assist, in a 3–2 win over Dordrecht in the last game of the season. Shortly after the match, the club suffered a huge setback by declaring themselves bankrupt meaning they would not play in the Eerste Divisie.

De Leeuw played four seasons for RBC Roosendaal, before joining SC Cambuur in summer 2011 on a two-year contract. During his time at RBC Roosendaal, De Leeuw recalled helping the club survive relegation, quoting:

The club had hit financial problems and all of a sudden we were back in danger. Before that we were safe, then we were back second bottom so we needed to re-adjust mentally and go through it all again. We needed to win to be safe — and we did. It took a lot of spirit and character for the players to switch on again for that final game and make sure they dug the club out of the hole. Sadly, the club still went bankrupt in the summer which was a great shame. But for us as players, and for the fans, it was good that we won the game — a great memory for me. It is something I can draw on in the current situation Ross County are in.

In the 2011–12 season, De Leeuw made his debut for Cambuur, in a 4–2 win over AGOVV Apeldoorn, in the opening game of the season and he scored his first goal, on 11 September 2011, in a 4–1 win over Volendam. On 9 December 2011, he scored twice, in a 5–1 win over Veendam. In his first season at Cambuur, De Leeuw scored eleven goals in thirty-four appearances in all competitions, becoming the club's second top-scorer behind Erik Bakker.

At the end of the 2012–13 season, it was announced that De Leeuw would be leaving the club on a free transfer.

=== Ross County ===
On 19 June 2013, De Leeuw signed for Scottish Premiership side Ross County, penning a two-year deal. Two months after joining Ross County F.C., De Leeuw said he had settled in Scotland and he thought that the Scottish Football playing style was more physical than in The Netherlands, but wasn't just "a bit kick and rush." De Leeuw also later said he had no regrets joining Ross County, saying it had been a great experience for him.

De Leeuw made his debut for the club, coming on as substitute in the 46th minute for Branislav Mićić, in a 3–1 loss against Partick Thistle. He scored his first goal for the club with an 89th-minute header to equalise against Hearts. Two minutes later, De Leeuw crossed the ball for Richard Brittain to score to win the game for Ross County. After the match, Manager Derek Adams praised De Leeuw's performance. He then scored in the next game, a 3–1 defeat against Motherwell. After scoring six goals, De Leeuw, then scored two goals in two games, both 1-1 draws, first against Aberdeen and then Celtic.

In the last game of the season, with Ross County's place in the Scottish Premiership secure for another season, De Leeuw scored the winning goal, as they beat Partick Thistle 3–2, to finish in seventh place. The win also boosted the club's earnings, as they received £200,000 in SPFL prize money. During the season, De Leeuw created controversy after claiming the club preferred to use their own home-grown players instead of foreign players in the first team. In his first season at Ross County, he finished the season as the top scorer, scoring nine goals in thirty-five appearances in all competitions.

Ahead of the 2014–15 season, De Leeuw was linked with a move away from Ross County, although the club said there had been no bids made for him. In the second round of the Scottish League Cup, De Leeuw scored his first goal of the season, from an opener, in a 2–1 win over Stranraer. However, on 28 October 2014, Ross County manager Jim McIntyre announced that De Leeuw's contract had been terminated after he asked to be released for personal reasons, with a return to his home country expected.

=== Army United F.C. ===
After leaving Ross County, de Leeuw returned to Netherlands, where he went on trial at NAC Breda. However, his trial at NAC Breda came to an end after the club opted against giving him a new contract.

After talks with PSV Eindhoven failed to materialise, de Leeuw looked further afield for a club. On 23 January 2015, de Leeuw signed a contract with Army United in Thai Premier League. Playing in the Army United F.C. in the Thai Premier League, De Leeuw expressed surprise over the playing style in the league, claiming it's easy to adapt.

=== Chiangmai United F.C. ===
Leeuw finished the first leg of the 2022/23 season with Chiangmai United F.C. as equal 19th highest goal scorer for the league with 5 goals.
