= Vangelis Ikonomou =

Greek footballer

Personal information
- Full name: Evangelos Ikonomou
- Date of birth: 18 July 1987 (age 39)
- Place of birth: Corinth, Greece
- Height: 1.86 m (6 ft 1 in)
- Position: Centre-back

Youth career
- 2004–2005: Korinthos

Senior career*
Years	Team	Apps	(Gls)
2005–2009	Ionikos	51	(0)
2006	→ Thyella Patras (loan)	8	(1)
2006–2007	→ Agios Dimitrios (loan)	30	(0)
2009–2011	Kavala	29	(0)
2011–2013	Atromitos	11	(1)
2013	Ross County	18	(0)
2013–2014	Veria	0	(0)
2014	Ross County	15	(0)
2014–2018	Panionios	90	(8)
2018–2019	Panathinaikos	21	(0)
2020	Volos	9	(0)
2020	Karmiotissa	7	(0)
2021–2022	Ayia Napa		

International career
2008	Greece U21	1	(0)
- * Club domestic league appearances and goals

Vangelis Ikonomou (Greek: Βαγγέλης Οικονόμου; born 18 July 1987) is a Greek former professional footballer who played as a centre-back.

== Career ==
Ikonomou began his professional career by joining Ionikos in January 2005. During his time with Ionikos he also played for Thyella Patras and Agios Dimitrios on loan. After his loan spell, Oikonomou played his first match of the season, providing assist by winning a penalty, allowing Oliver Makor to convert, in a 2–1 win over Ethnikos Piraeus. At Ionikos, He soon became a first team regular. During the season, Oikonomou was sent off twice; The first was in a game against Giannina for receiving a second yellow card and the second was for receiving a straight red card.

In the summer transfer window, Ikonomou then signed for Kavala on a fee of €250,000. He made his debut, making his first start and playing 90 minutes, in a 1–0 win over Levadiakos. He since established himself in the first team at Kavala. During the season, Ikonomou was sent off twice, like last season at Ionikos; The first was in a game against Aris for Mass confrontation in a 0–0 draw and the second was against Panionios for receiving a second yellow card on the final games of the season. However, the next season, Oikonomou playing time was soon reduced, with lack of first team opportunities and only made four appearances.

Because of the Kavala's involvement in the match-fixing scandal, Ikonomou was given a free transfer and joined Atromitos on a two-year deal with the club. He made his debut for the club, coming on as a substitute for goalscorer Stelios Sfakianakis, in a 1–0 win over AEK Athens. Months on, his playing time was soon reduced, like at Kavala, with lack of first team opportunities. But later on the season, his first team was soon progressed. Soon on 18 March 2012, Ikonomou scored his first goal for the club, in a 2–2 draw against Levadiakos. He also played in the Greek Cup Final, in a 2–1 loss against Greek Champions Olympiacos, having previously played against them on the final game of the season in the league. The next season, Oikonomou made no appearances for the club throughout the first half of the season and was given a free transfer by the club.

He signed for Scottish Premier League club Ross County in January 2013. After joining the club, Oionomou revealed that countryman Georgios Samaras played a role in his joining Ross County. Ikonomou made his debut for the club, playing at left-back, in a 2–2 draw against Hearts. He then established himself in the left-back position in defence. In a 3–2 win over Celtic, Oikonomou provided an assist for Steffen Wohlfarth to score the winning goal in the 90th minute. In a 4–2 loss against Hearts, he scored an own-goal, to put Hearts in the lead. At the end of the season, Oikonomou left the club.

On 23 August 2013 the Greek Super League side Veria announced the sign of Ikonomou for one year. He was not among the priorities of his coach therefore, on 3 January 2014, Ikonomou returned to Ross County, signing a contract until the end of the 2013–14 season. On 4 January 2014, Ikonomou is poised to earn his second Ross County debut after being named in the starting lineup for his club visit of St Johnstone in the Scottish Premiership. The Greek left-back enjoyed a six-month spell at Victoria Park in the second half of last season, before signing on for an additional stint earlier this week.

After being released by Ross County, Ikonomou joined Cyprus side Doxa Katokopias on a one-year contract. Eventually, he did not play with Doxa Katokopias and signed to Panionios. On 28 September 2016, Panionios officially the extension of experienced central/left defender contract, until the summer of 2020.

On 29 December 2017, Oikonomou is Panathinaikos' first transfer in January 2017 window. The 30-year-old defender signed a six-month contract with a renewal option for another two years for an undisclosed fee. "I know I'm coming to a big team, he can face some problems, but he's a big club with a lot of people. Marinos Ouzounidis played a very important impact in my signing.", said the player. On 24 December 2019, he mutually ended his contract with the club.

== Honours ==
Atromitos

- Greek Cup runner-up: 2011–12
