= Joe Malin =

Scottish footballer

Personal information
- Full name: Joseph Malinauskas
- Date of birth: 13 July 1988 (age 38)
- Place of birth: Bellshill, Scotland
- Height: 1.86 m (6 ft 1 in)
- Position: Goalkeeper

Team information
- Current team: Clachnacuddin
- Number: 1

Youth career
- –2005: Celtic
- Ross County

Senior career*
Years	Team	Apps	(Gls)
2005–2012	Ross County	36	(0)
2007	→ Elgin City (loan)	6	(0)
2008	→ Elgin City (loan)	22	(0)
2013–2024	Brora Rangers	320	(0)
- * Club domestic league appearances and goals as of 12 May 2011

Joseph Malin (born 13 July 1988 in Bellshill) is a Scottish football player, who plays as a goalkeeper for Clachnacuddin. Malin has previously played for Ross County, Elgin City and Brora Rangers.

Malin, originally Malinauskas, is of Lithuanian descent, and is also eligible to represent Lithuania at the international level.

Malin was released by Ross County in December 2012. On 18 June 2013, Malin signed for Highland Football League Club, Brora Rangers FC, on a two-year deal. In October 2021, Malin kept his 150th clean sheet for Brora Rangers in his 289th appearance for the club.

== Honours ==
Ross County

- Scottish Challenge Cup: 2006–07, 2010–11
