= Sam Morrow =

Northern Irish footballer (born 1985)

Personal information
- Full name: Samuel Morrow
- Date of birth: 3 March 1985 (age 41)
- Place of birth: Limavady, Northern Ireland
- Position: Striker

Youth career
- 1999–2001: Institute

Senior career*
Years	Team	Apps	(Gls)
2001–2004	Ipswich Town	0	(0)
2003–2004	→ Boston United (loan)	2	(0)
2004–2007	Hibernian	30	(3)
2006	→ Livingston (loan)	11	(3)
2007	→ Partick Thistle (loan)	8	(1)
2007–2009	Derry City	41	(7)
2010	Coleraine	6	(0)
2010–2011	Tranmere Rovers	5	(0)
2011–2013	Ross County	34	(6)
2014–2015	Linfield	23	(5)
2015–2016	Coleraine	24	(2)
2017	Institute	9	(4)
Total		193	(31)

International career
	Northern Ireland U21	3	(4)
- * Club domestic league appearances and goals

Samuel Morrow (born 3 March 1985) is a Northern Irish former professional association footballer who played as a striker.

== Playing career ==
=== Youth ===
Morrow, who was raised in Limavady, County Londonderry, started as a youth at Institute.

=== Ipswich Town ===
Morrow began his professional career at Ipswich Town where he made his debut as an 18-year-old in a League Cup match versus Notts County. He had a short loan spell during the 2003–04 season to Boston United before leaving the club without any league appearances.

=== Hibernian ===
In the summer of 2004, Tony Mowbray signed Morrow for Hibernian, having known him from his time as the Ipswich assistant manager. Morrow only started five league matches in his first season with Hibs, but proved to be useful as a substitute, scoring goals in wins against Dundee and Dundee United. He also scored in third and fourth round wins during Hibernian's 2005-05 Scottish Cup campaign.

=== Livingston (loan) ===
Morrow was loaned to Livingston during the 2005–06 season which proved very successful, with goals against Hearts and Dundee Utd. Gary Waddock, then Queens Park Rangers manager along with his assistant Alan McDonald wanted to bring Morrow south of the border and a deal was close to completion when disaster struck with him suffering cruciate ligament damage in April 2006. This was also a major blow to Morrow as he was already named in the full Northern Ireland squad to face Romania and Uruguay that summer.

=== Partick Thistle (loan) ===
Morrow started a further loan spell, with Partick Thistle, in March 2007 to help aid his comeback from the long-term injury.

=== Derry City ===
At the end of the 2006–07 season Morrow was given a free transfer by Hibs, and he subsequently signed for Derry City.

In 2008, he scored a hat-trick in the League of Ireland Cup final, and was named Man of The Match, when Derry beat Wexford 6–1, to win the competition for the 9th time. He also scored both of Derry's goals in the 2008 FAI Cup Final, a game that was subsequently lost on penalties to League of Ireland champions Bohemians. Morrow opted to leave Derry City after the club was relegated for financial irregularities.

=== Coleraine ===
In January 2010, Morrow was expected to join Dunfermline Athletic, on a six-month deal, but instead signed an 18-month contract with Coleraine.

=== Tranmere Rovers ===
On 30 August 2010, Morrow signed a one-year contract with English League One club Tranmere Rovers. At the end of the 2010–11 season he was not offered a new contract by the club.

=== Ross County ===
On 16 June 2011, Morrow signed up with Ross County. This proved to be a successful move for Morrow as he was part of the 1st Division winning team that set a new Scottish record by going 40 league games unbeaten subsequently getting promoted to the SPL. The following season he played a key role for Ross County by securing a top 6 finish in the club's debut season in the top flight. Morrow scored some important goals against St Mirren, St Johnstone and more impressively in the 3–2 win against SPL champions Celtic.

=== Linfield ===
In May 2014, Morrow signed a one-year deal at Linfield, playing in Northern Ireland's NIFL Premiership. He scored a fantastic solo goal in the Boxing Day Derby win versus fierce rivals Glentoran to level the game on the stroke of half time.

=== Return to Coleraine ===
Two days after being released by Linfield, he agreed a two-year deal with Coleraine in May 2015, bringing him back to the club for a second spell. However, in December 2016, he agreed the termination of his contract with the club by mutual consent, in search of more regular playing time.

=== Institute ===
Morrow agreed a January move to Institute just a day later, marking a return to the club where he spent his youth football years and made his debut in a 4-2 Irish Cup win away to Ballyclare on 7 January 2017. He scored his first goal for the club in a 3–1 home win over Knockbreda in the NIFL Championship on 11 February 2017.

Morrow scored an important equalising goal in the second leg of that season's NIFL Premiership play-off final against Carrick Rangers, this however wasn't enough to stop his side from suffering a 5–2 defeat on aggregate.

He retired from football in May 2017 following the end of his 6-month deal.

== Post-playing career ==
Morrow was a scout for Birmingham City before moving to Wigan Athletic to take up a similar role.
