= Euan Norris =

Scottish football referee

Euan Norris (born 29 October 1977) was a Scottish football referee who was active in the Scottish Premier League.

Norris became a FIFA referee in 2009. He has officiated in UEFA Euro 2012 qualification.
