= Branislav Mićić =

Swiss footballer (born 1990)

Personal information
- Full name: Branislav Mićić
- Date of birth: 17 April 1990 (age 36)
- Place of birth: Loznica, SFR Yugoslavia
- Height: 1.85 m (6 ft 1 in)
- Position: Defender

Team information
- Current team: FC Aesch

Youth career
- –2008: FC Basel
- 2008: Grenchen

Senior career*
Years	Team	Apps	(Gls)
2009	Union Royale Namur	3	(0)
2009–2013	Sion	0	(0)
2009–2013	Sion U-21		
2010	→ FC Le Mont (loan)	8	(0)
2013–2014	Ross County	10	(0)
2014–2018	Black Stars Basel	85	(16)
2018–	FC Aesch		

International career
2005–2006	Switzerland U16	3	(0)
2006–2007	Switzerland U17	4	(0)
2007–2008	Switzerland U18	4	(0)
2010	Switzerland U20	3	(0)
- * Club domestic league appearances and goals as of 23:29, 9 May 2021 (UTC)

Branislav Mićić (born 17 April 1990) is a Swiss former professional footballer who is currently with FC Aesch having previously been with Scottish Premiership club Ross County.

== Youth football ==
Mićić played his youth football in the youth department of FC Basel, progressing regularly through the ranks. He played in the Swiss championship at U-16 level in the 2005–06 season, winning the championship with a 3–0 win in the final against the U-16 team from FC Winterthur.

In the summer of 2008 he moved to the youth of FC Grenchen. Six months later he went to Belgium and joined Union Royale Namur. In summer 2009 he joined the youth department of Sion and played with their U-21 team. In March 2010 he was loaned out to FC Le Mont for the second half of the 2009–10 Challenge League season, but they suffered relegation. He returned to the Sion U-21 team and on a few occasions he was on the bench when the first team played. He had one sole appearance with the first team in the 2011–12 Swiss Cup. He came on as substitute on 26 November 2011 as they won 2–1 away from home against amateur club FC Tuggen.

== Ross County ==
Mićić signed for Ross County on 31 January 2013 on a six-month contract. He was handed his debut as a substitute during the 2–2 draw with St Johnstone on 21 April 2013, picking up a yellow card in the progress.

It was confirmed on 21 May 2013 that Mićić had been handed a contract extension as a reward for the fifth-placed finish in the SPL.

On 31 January 2014, Mićić left Ross County by mutual consent

== End of career ==
Mićić returned to Switzerland and joined semi-professional club Black Stars Basel. In summer 2018 he joined local amateur club FC Aesch.
