= Steffen Wohlfarth =

German footballer (born 1983)

Personal information
- Date of birth: 14 September 1983 (age 43)
- Place of birth: Friedrichshafen, West Germany
- Height: 1.86 m (6 ft 1 in)
- Position: Striker

Youth career
- SC Schnetzenhausen
- –1999: VfB Friedrichshafen
- 1999–2002: SC Freiburg

Senior career*
Years	Team	Apps	(Gls)
2002–2006	SC Freiburg II	121	(44)
2005–2006	SC Freiburg	0	(0)
2006–2011	FC Ingolstadt 04	132	(28)
2011	Bayern Munich II	19	(6)
2011–2013	Wehen Wiesbaden	52	(12)
2013	Ross County	11	(3)
2013–2019	FV Ravensburg	139	(59)
Total		374	(152)

Managerial career
- 2017–2022: FV Ravensburg
- * Club domestic league appearances and goals

Steffen Wohlfarth (born 14 September 1983) is a German professional football manager and former player who was most recently the manager of Oberliga Baden-Württemberg club FV Ravensburg.

During his playing days, he was a striker. He is known for nickname as "Wolfman".

== Career ==
Born in Friedrichshafen, Wohlfarth started his football career at SC Schnetzenhausen and VfB Friedrichshafen before moving to SC Freiburg. He played for the club's reserve side and, three years later, was promoted to the club's first team ahead of the 2005–06 season.

Due to lack of first-team opportunities at Freiburg, Wohlfarth joined FC Ingolstadt 04 in 2006. In the 2007–08 season, the club was promoted to the 2. Bundesliga, where Wohlfarth scored eleven goals in 33 appearances. He made his debut in the 2. Bundesliga for Ingolstadt on 17 August 2008 when he started in a game against Greuther Fürth. Having his career resurrected, his Ingolstadt career soon faded and under manager Benno Möhlmann, Wohlfarth left the club on 21 December 2010 by mutual consent with immediate effect.

On 7 January 2011, Wohlfarth joined Bayern Munich II on a two-year contract. He made his debut on 22 January 2011 in a 2–0 loss against Wacker Burghausen. On 11 February 2011, he scored his first goal, a penalty, in a 2–1 loss against Carl Zeiss Jena. During the season, Wohlfarth scored six goals for Bayern Munich II while the club was relegated from the 3. Liga after finishing 20th place.

After Bayern Munich II's relegation, Wohlfarth joined SV Wehen Wiesbaden on a two-year contract. He scored twice on his debut, in a 2–1 win over Werder Bremen II. In his first season, Wohlfarth was used more often in the first team, making 35 appearances and scoring 10 times. During the 2012–13 season his first-team opportunities became limited.On 2 January 2013, it was announced that Wohlfarth had left Wehen Wiesbaden by mutual consent with immediate effect.

A week after his release, on 21 January 2013, Wohlfarth joined SPL side Ross County on a short term deal. Nine days later, he made his debut for the club, coming on as a substitute in a 1–0 win over Hibernian. He made ten appearances coming on as a substitute in the second half, including his first goal, which was a winner, in a 3–2 win over Celtic on 9 March 2013. Several weeks later, on 6 April 2013, Wohlfarth scored twice, as Ross County lost 4–2 against Hearts. At the end of the 2012–13 season, Wohlfarth said he might leave the club, citing personal reasons. Having been offered a new contract by the club, Wohlfarth left the club. Following his released from Ross County, Wohlfarth announced his retirement from professional football.

In 2013, he joined Oberliga Baden-Württemberg side FV Ravensburg.
