= 2007–08 Doncaster Rovers F.C. season =

Doncaster Rovers F.C.
2007–08 season
- Manager: Sean O'Driscoll
- Stadium: Keepmoat Stadium
- League One: 3rd (promoted)
- FA Cup: First round (Vs. Oldham Athletic)
- League Cup: Second round (Vs. Plymouth Argyle
- Football League Trophy: Quarter finals (Vs. Grimsby Town)
- Top goalscorer: League: James Hayter, Paul Heffernan, Jason Price (7); All: James Hayter (11)
- Average home league attendance: 7,978
Home colours	Away colours

During the 2007–08 English football season, Doncaster Rovers F.C. competed in League One. The team were in fourth place by the New Year, and ended up in the top three during the final stages of the league. They were promoted to the Championship along with two other teams.

== Season summary ==
This was Doncaster's fourth consecutive season in League One.

With Adam Brown, Jan Budtz, Liam Green, Rob Pacey, Jon-Paul Pittman, and Sean Thornton released, several new players were brought in for the beginning of the season. James Hayter was bought from Bournemouth, Gordon Greer came from Kilmarnock, free agents Sam Hird and Neil Sullivan came from Leeds, Richie Wellens from Oldham, Martin Woods from Rotherham, and Matt Mills was loaned from Manchester City.

Rovers were in 4th place by the New Year, and by the last game of the season they were in 2nd place but needed a win at Cheltenham to guarantee promotion to the Championship. Cheltenham won, as did 3rd placed Nottingham Forest, so Doncaster had to compete in the play-offs. First, they drew away at Southend where Paul Heffernan was sent off for a "head butt", but in the home leg they won 5–1, with James Coppinger getting a hattrick.

The play-off final was at the new Wembley against a Leeds side that had failed to get an automatic place partly following a pre-season 15 point deduction for exiting administration without a CVA. The contest attracted an attendance of 75,132, the biggest crowd Doncaster had ever played in front of. From a Brian Stock corner, James Hayter headed in the only goal of the match in the 47th minute and Doncaster were promoted to the second tier after an absence of 50 years when they had been relegated at the end of the 1957–58 season.

Progress in the three cup tournaments was limited.

The average league attendance figure of 7,978 was marginally up on the previous season and the highest since the 1969–70 season.

During the season it was announced that Terry Bramall and Dick Watson had become equal controlling shareholders alongside John Ryan.

== League One ==
=== League table ===
Pos	Team	Pld	W	D	L	GF	GA	GD	Pts	Promotion, qualification or relegation
1	Swansea City (C, P)	46	27	11	8	82	42	+40	92	Promotion to Football League Championship
2	Nottingham Forest (P)	46	22	16	8	64	32	+32	82	Promotion to Football League Championship
3	Doncaster Rovers (O, P)	46	23	11	12	65	41	+24	80	Qualification for League One play-offs (Note: Four teams play for one spot and promotion to the Football League Championship.)
4	Carlisle United	46	23	11	12	64	46	+18	80	Qualification for League One play-offs
5	Leeds United	46	27	10	9	72	38	+34	76 (Note: Leeds deducted 15 points for failure to comply with rules on insolvency.)	Qualification for League One play-offs

Updated to match(es) played on 3 May 2008. Source: The Football League
Rules for classification: 1) points; 2) goal difference; 3) number of goals scored.
(C) Champions; (O) Play-off winners; (P) Promoted

=== Results ===
League One match details
Date	Opponents	Venue	Result	Score F–A	Scorers	Attendance	Ref.
11 August 2007	Millwall	H	D	0–0		7,542	
18 August 2007	Hartlepool United	A	L	1–2	Hayter 71'	5,544	
25 August 2007	AFC Bournemouth	H	L	1–2	Greer 24'	6,476	
1 September 2007	Swansea City	A	W	2–1	Wellens 68', 84'	11,933	
7 September 2007	Northampton Town	A	L	0–2		5,274	
16 September 2007	Crewe Alexandra	H	W	2–0	Heffernan 31', Woodards 48' o.g.	6,726	
22 September 2007	Southend United	A	L	2–3	G. Roberts 28', Guy 36'	8,117	
29 September 2007	Cheltenham Town	H	W	2–0	Guy 18', Mills 58'	6,150	
2 October 2007	Walsall	H	L	2–3	Mills 17', Guy 40'	6,038	
6 October 2007	Luton Town	A	D	1–1	Hayter 67'	6,513	
14 October 2007	Huddersfield Town	H	W	2–0	Stock 13', Wilson 65'	6,866	
20 October 2007	Nottingham Forest	A	D	0–0		23,108	
28 October 2007	Leyton Orient	H	W	4–2	Wellens 52', 88', Price 69', Hayter 83'	7,184	
3 November 2007	Swindon Town	A	W	2–1	Stock 31', Guy 73'	6,517	
6 November 2007	Gillingham	A	D	1–1	Hayter 65' pen.	5,030	
17 November 2007	Tranmere Rovers	H	D	0–0		7,070	
24 November 2007	Port Vale	A	W	3–1	Guy 59', Hayter 68', Wellens 81'	4,581	
4 December 2007	Brighton & Hove Albion	H	D	0–0		6,215	
8 December 2007	Oldham Athletic	A	D	1–1	Hayter 90' pen.	4,776	
16 December 2007	Yeovil Town	H	L	1–2	Skiverton 90' o.g.	5,967	
22 December 2007	Crewe Alexandra	A	W	4–0	Price 38', 50', Green 90', Guy 90'	4,122	
26 December 2007	Northampton Town	H	W	2–0	McCammon 11', Lockwood 29'	7,046	
29 December 2007	Southend United	H	W	3–1	Lockwood 8', Green 30', G. Roberts 42'	7,163	
1 January 2008	Walsall	A	D	1–1	Price 45'	6,266	
12 January 2008	Carlisle United	H	W	1–0	Hayter 84'	8,197	
19 January 2008	Leeds United	A	W	1–0	Stock 21'	31,402	
25 January 2008	Swansea City	H	L	0–4		10,358	
29 January 2008	Hartlepool United	H	W	2–0	Wellens 34', Lockwood 54'	6,442	
2 February 2008	Millwall	A	W	3–0	Price 43, Coppinger 77, Green 90'	8,230	
9 February 2008	Bristol Rovers	H	W	2–0	Stock 65' pen., Heffernan 90' pen.	8,168	
12 February 2008	AFC Bournemouth	A	W	2–0	Price 1', 70'	4,947	
23 February 2008	Carlisle United	A	L	0–1		8,390	
1 March 2008	Tranmere Rovers	A	W	1–0	Coppinger 2'	7,551	
4 March 2008	Bristol Rovers	A	W	1–0	Heffernan 3'	3,933	
8 March 2008	Port Vale	H	W	2–1	Heffernan 11', McCammon 19'	8,040	
11 March 2008	Gillingham	H	W	2–1	Coppinger 4', Heffernan 48' pen.	7,867	
15 March 2008	Brighton & Hove Albion	A	L	0–1		6,252	
21 March 2008	Yeovil Town	A	L	1–2	Heffernan 73'	6,146	
24 March 2008	Oldham Athletic	H	D	1–1	Heffernan 37'	8,777	
28 March 2008	Nottingham Forest	H	W	1–0	G. Roberts 74'	12,508	
1 April 2008	Leeds United	H	L	0–1		15,001	
5 April 2008	Huddersfield Town	A	D	2–2	Taylor 52, Green 84'	10,279	
11 April 2008	Swindon Town	H	W	2–0	McDaid 39', Stock 68' pen.	8,371	
19 April 2008	Leyton Orient	A	D	1–1	McCammon 60'	4,582	
26 April 2008	Luton Town	H	W	2–0	Mills 34', McCammon 68'	9,332	
3 May 2008	Cheltenham Town	A	L	1–2	Green 76'	6,787	

=== Play-offs ===
League One play-offs match details
Round	Date	Opponents	Venue	Result	Score F–A	Scorers	Attendance	Ref.
Semi-final first leg	9 May 2008	Southend United	A	D	0–0		9,109	
Semi-final second leg	16 May 2008	Southend United	H	W	5–1	Stock 11' pen., Barrett 21' o.g., Coppinger 39', 52', 80'	13,081	
Final	25 May 2008	Leeds United	N	W	1–0	Hayter 48'	75,132	

== FA Cup ==
FA Cup match details
Round	Date	Opponents	Venue	Result	Score F–A	Scorers	Attendance	Ref.
First round	10 November 2007	Oldham Athletic	A	D	2–2	Hayter 63', 86'	4,280	
First round replay	27 November 2007	Oldham Athletic	H	L	1–2	McCammon 26'	4,340	

== League Cup ==
League Cup match details
Round	Date	Opponents	Venue	Result	Score F–A	Scorers	Attendance	Ref.
First round	14 August 2007	Lincoln City	H	W	4–1	Hayter 23', Wellens 55', Heffernan 59', McCammon 73'	5,084	
Second round	28 August 2007	Plymouth Argyle	A	L	0–2		5,133	

== Football League Trophy ==
Football League Trophy match details
Round	Date	Opponents	Venue	Result	Score F–A	Scorers	Attendance	Ref.
First round	4 September 2007	Bradford City	H	W	5–1	McCammon 16', 41', Guy 24', Woods 64', Harban 78' o.g.	4,710	
Second round	23 October 2007	Oldham Athletic	H	W	3–0	Price 54', Green 74', Woods 87'	4,608	
Quarter-final	13 November 2007	Grimsby Town	A	D	2–2 (4–5 p)	Guy 25', Heffernan 79' pen.	4,011	

== Squad ==
=== Statistics ===
Players with a zero in every column only appeared as unused substitutes.

No.	Pos	Nat	Player	Total		League One		League One Play-offs		FA Cup		League Cup		League Trophy	
No.	Pos	Nat	Player	Apps	Goals	Apps	Goals	Apps	Goals	Apps	Goals	Apps	Goals	Apps	Goals
1	GK	(Scotland) SCO	Neil Sullivan	55	0	46	0	3	0	2	0	2	0	2	0
2	DF	(England) ENG	James O'Connor	49	0	40	0	3	0	2	0	2	0	2	0
3	DF	(Wales) WAL	Gareth Roberts	45	3	35+2	3	3	0	1	0	2	0	2	0
4	MF	(Wales) WAL	Stephen Roberts	28	0	20+5	0	0	0	0	0	0	0	2+1	0
5	DF	(England) ENG	Graeme Lee	1	0	0+1	0	0	0	0	0	0	0	0	0
7	FW	(England) ENG	Lewis Guy	39	8	13+16	6	1+2	0	1+1	0	1+1	0	3	2
8	MF	(Wales) WAL	Brian Stock	46	6	40	5	3	1	2	0	0	0	1	0
9	FW	(Barbados) BRB	Mark McCammon	39	8	22+9	4	0+3	0	1	1	0+2	1	1+1	2
10	FW	(Wales) WAL	Gareth Taylor	12	1	4+8	1	0	0	0	0	0	0	0	0
11	DF	(England) ENG	Adam Lockwood	44	3	39	3	0+1	0	2	0	2	0	0	0
12	MF	(England) ENG	James Hayter	43	11	22+13	7	2+1	1	2	2	2	1	0+1	0
13	GK	(England) ENG	Ben Smith	2	0	0+0	0	0	0	0	0	0	0	1+1	0
14	FW	(Republic of Ireland) IRL	Paul Heffernan	32	9	18+9	7	1	0	0	0	2	1	2	1
15	MF	(England) ENG	Mark Wilson	35	1	24+8	1	0	0	0	0	1+1	0	1	0
16	MF	(England) ENG	Anthony Griffith	0	0	0	0	0	0	0	0	0	0	0	0
17	MF	(Scotland) SCO	Martin Woods	22	2	7+8	0	0	0	2	0	2	0	2+1	2
18	MF	(Scotland) SCO	Sean McDaid	29	1	14+10	1	0	0	1	0	1+1	0	2	0
19	MF	(England) ENG	Richie Wellens	52	7	44	6	2	0	2	0	2	1	1+1	0
20	MF	(Republic of Ireland) IRL	Paul Green	45	6	26+12	5	3	0	1	0	0	0	3	1
21	DF	(England) ENG	Sam Hird	9	0	3+1	0	3	0	0	0	0	0	1+1	0
22	DF	(England) ENG	Matthew Mills	41	3	29+5	3	3	0	0	0	1	0	3	0
23	MF	(Wales) WAL	Jason Price	35	8	18+11	7	3	0	0+2	0	0	0	1	1
24	DF	(Scotland) SCO	Gordon Greer	17	1	10+1	1	0	0	2	0	1+1	0	2	0
25	MF	(Northern Ireland) NIR	Stuart Elliott	10	0	1+9	0	0	0	0	0	0	0	0	0
26	MF	(England) ENG	James Coppinger	46	6	31+8	3	3	3	1+1	0	1	0	1	0
27	MF	(England) ENG	Craig Nelthorpe	4	0	0+2	0	0	0	0+1	0	0	0	0+1	0
30	DF	(England) ENG	Matt Noble	0	0	0	0	0	0	0	0	0	0	0	0
Players who left the club during the season:
	GK	(England) ENG	Barry Richardson	0	0	0	0	0	0	0	0	0	0	0	0
	MF	(Northern Ireland) NIR	Kevin Horlock	0	0	0	0	0	0	0	0	0	0	0	0
	FW	(Montserrat) MSR	Bruce Dyer	1	0	0	0	0	0	0	0	0	0	0+1	0

==== Goals record ====
As of 23 January 2018

Rank	No.	Po.	Name	League One	League One Play-offs	FA Cup	League Cup	League Trophy	Total
1	12	FW	James Hayter	7	1	2	1	0	11
2	14	FW	Paul Heffernan	7	0	0	1	1	9
3	23	FW	Jason Price	7	0	0	0	1	8
3	7	FW	Lewis Guy	6	0	0	0	2	8
3	9	FW	Mark McCammon	4	0	1	1	2	8
6	19	MF	Richie Wellens	6	0	0	1	0	7
7	8	MF	Brian Stock	5	1	0	0	0	6
7	20	MF	Paul Green	5	0	0	0	1	6
7	26	MF	James Coppinger	3	3	0	0	0	6
10	3	DF	Gareth Roberts	3	0	0	0	0	3
10	22	DF	Matt Mills	3	0	0	0	0	3
10	11	DF	Adam Lockwood	3	0	0	0	0	3
13	17	MF	Martin Woods	0	0	0	0	2	2
14	24	DF	Gordon Greer	1	0	0	0	0	1
14	15	MF	Mark Wilson	1	0	0	0	0	1
14	10	MF	Gareth Taylor	1	0	0	0	0	1
14	18	MF	Sean McDaid	1	0	0	0	0	1
Own Goals				2	1	0	0	1	4
Total				65	6	3	4	10	88

==== Disciplinary record ====
As of 23 January 2018

No.	Pos.	Name	League One			League One Play-offs			FA Cup			League Cup			League Trophy			Total		
No.	Pos.	Name	Booked	(yellow card) (yellow-red card)	Sent off (straight red)	Booked	(yellow card) (yellow-red card)	Sent off (straight red)	Booked	(yellow card) (yellow-red card)	Sent off (straight red)	Booked	(yellow card) (yellow-red card)	Sent off (straight red)	Booked	(yellow card) (yellow-red card)	Sent off (straight red)	Booked	(yellow card) (yellow-red card)	Sent off (straight red)
1	GK	Neil Sullivan	3	0	0	1	0	0	0	0	0	0	0	0	0	0	0	4	0	0
2	DF	James O'Connor	3	0	0	0	0	0	0	0	0	0	0	0	0	0	0	3	0	0
3	DF	Gareth Roberts	3	0	0	0	0	0	0	0	0	0	0	0	0	0	0	3	0	0
4	MF	Stephen Roberts	3	0	1	0	0	0	0	0	0	0	0	0	0	0	0	3	0	1
7	FW	Lewis Guy	1	0	1	0	0	0	0	0	0	0	0	0	0	0	0	1	0	1
8	MF	Brian Stock	6	0	0	0	0	0	2	0	0	0	0	0	0	0	0	8	0	0
9	FW	Mark McCammon	4	0	0	0	0	0	0	0	0	0	0	0	0	0	0	4	0	0
11	DF	Adam Lockwood	5	0	0	0	0	0	0	0	0	0	0	0	0	0	0	5	0	0
12	FW	James Hayter	1	0	0	0	0	0	0	0	0	0	0	0	0	0	0	1	0	0
14	FW	Paul Heffernan	1	0	0	0	0	1	0	0	0	0	0	0	0	0	0	1	0	1
15	MF	Mark Wilson	3	0	0	0	0	0	0	0	0	0	0	0	0	0	0	3	0	0
17	MF	Martin Woods	1	0	0	0	0	0	0	0	0	0	0	0	0	0	0	1	0	0
18	MF	Sean McDaid	0	0	0	0	0	0	0	0	0	0	0	0	1	0	0	1	0	0
19	MF	Richie Wellens	2	0	0	0	0	0	1	0	0	0	0	0	0	0	0	3	0	0
20	MF	Paul Green	2	0	0	0	0	0	0	0	0	0	0	0	0	0	0	2	0	0
21	DF	Sam Hird	1	0	0	0	0	0	0	0	0	0	0	0	1	0	0	2	0	0
22	DF	Matt Mills	7	0	1	0	0	0	0	0	0	0	0	0	0	0	0	7	0	1
23	FW	Jason Price	3	0	0	0	0	0	0	0	0	0	0	0	0	0	0	3	0	0
25	MF	Stuart Elliott	1	0	0	0	0	0	0	0	0	0	0	0	0	0	0	1	0	0
26	MF	James Coppinger	3	0	0	0	0	0	0	0	0	0	0	0	0	0	0	3	0	0
Total			53	0	3	1	0	1	3	0	0	0	0	0	2	0	0	59	0	4
