= Auto Windscreens =

British automotive glazing company

- Type: Limited Company (No. 07518924)
- Industry: Automotive glazing
- Predecessor: Auto Windscreens Ltd (No. 01011907)
- Founded: 3 March 2011
- Headquarters: Britannia House, Storforth Lane, Chesterfield, Derbyshire, S40 2UZ
- Area served: United Kingdom
- Key people: James Macbeth
- Services: Windscreen repair and replacement
- Number of employees: 440 (at March 2013)
- Parent: Auto Windscreens Services Limited
- Website: autowindscreens.co.uk

Auto Windscreens is a United Kingdom automotive glazing company specialising in windscreen repair and replacement. It is owned by Auto Windscreens Services Limited, and is headquartered in Chesterfield, Derbyshire. Working predominantly with insurers, brokers and fleet management customers, the company operates a nationwide fitting centre network that utilises a mobile fleet of trained technicians.

It is one of the largest windscreen replacement operations in the United Kingdom, with hundreds of employees working across its sites and at its Chesterfield based customer service contact centre. Auto Windscreens was established in March 2011, after the collapse of the previous company, which had operated since 1971.

== Auto Windscreens (1971–2011) ==
Auto Windscreens Ltd
- Type: Limited company (No. 01011907)
- Industry: Automotive glazing
- Founded: 20 May 1971
- Defunct: 25 February 2011
- Fate: In liquidation (administration 14 Feb 2011) (closed 25 Feb 2011)
- Successor: Trifords Ltd (No. 07518924)
- Headquarters: Britannia House, Storforth Lane, Chesterfield, Derbyshire, S40 2UZ
- Number of locations: Manufacturing plant Distribution centre Call centre Fitting centres (68); Mobile fitting units (550)
- Area served: United Kingdom
- Services: Repair and replacement Original equipment manufacturer
- Number of employees: 1,042 (2011)
- Parent: Heywood Williams Group (1986–1998); HSBC Private Equity (1990–2001); RAC plc (2001–2008); Arques Industries AG (2008–2009); Moguntia Invest (2008–2011); Deloitte (administrator) (2011)
- Website: autowindscreens.co.uk

=== History ===
The company was founded by an entrepreneur (Brian Holmes) in 1971. It was incorporated on 20 May as Auto Windscreens (Chesterfield) Ltd, as company number 01011907. was part of national windscreens. In 1982, it opened its own manufacturing facility in Chesterfield.

In 1986, it was purchased by the holding company, Heywood Williams, whose businesses portfolio at the time included the largest glass distribution company in the United Kingdom.

In 1988, the company was renamed to just Auto Windscreens Ltd, and in 1989 to Heywood Williams Automotive Ltd. Having sold the glass distribution business in 1990 to Pilkington, Heywood Williams sold the Auto Windscreens company to HSBC Private Equity in August 1998, for £77.2m, reverting to the name Auto Windscreens Ltd.

HSBC left the existing management structure in place, with the intention of a trade sale or flotation at a later date.

A trade sale by HSBC followed in March 2001, with the company being sold to the group Lex Service plc for £112m. Lex were also the owners of RAC Motoring Services Ltd, one of the largest automotive road side repair recovery companies in the United Kingdom, alongside The Automobile Association, and re branded and renamed the company as RAC Auto Windscreens and RAC Auto Windscreens Ltd.

The takeover positioned the company as the contracted supplier to other Lex Group insurance companies, and expanded the visibility of the RAC brand through the Auto Windscreen's vehicle fleet. Having purchased the RAC business from the Royal Automobile Club in September 1999, Lex Group renamed themselves RAC plc in 2002.

The RAC Auto Windscreens business was included as part of the deal to buy RAC plc by the global insurance group Aviva in March 2005.

In December 2008, as their first acquisition in the United Kingdom, the business was purchased from Aviva by the German private equity company Arques Industries AG, a business restructuring and development specialist, for a "symbolic purchase price".

After the purchase, the company reverted to the name Auto Windscreens Ltd, and was re established as an independent brand, with a redesigned logo. In December 2009, the company was sold to Moguntia Invest, a German investment fund controlled by Christian Daumann. Daumann was the Arques executive responsible for their original purchase of the company a year before.

==== Administration ====
On 14 February 2011, the company entered administration, suspending trading and sending staff home. With a turnover of £63m, the company had run out of cash after a drop in business leading to an unnamed creditor filing a winding up order.

Cash flow problems had arisen after their former owner Aviva, still a major client, terminated their supply contract, and after IT related delays affected the implementation of a restructuring programme. As the appointed administrators, Deloitte sought to find a source of short term trading capital, pending a sale of the business.

Both before and after the suspension of trading, several other companies took over Auto Windscreen's share of the market, with Autoglass gaining the Aviva contract, as well as National Windscreens, Nationwide Windscreen Services and AA AutoWindshields, being chosen as alternative suppliers by both fleet and private customers.

==== Liquidation ====
On 7 February 2011, Trifords Ltd was formed as a business by the parent company Markerstudy Group Insurance, the details of the purpose of this business are still a little vague but by the dates we can see, it was ready for the purchase of AW before the liquidators were called.

After failing to find a buyer for the business as a going concern, Deloitte announced on 25 February 2011 that it had been closed and would be liquidated, with 1,042 staff being made redundant.

On 3 March 2011, it was announced that Trifords Ltd that they had purchased some parts of the former Auto Windscreens business, including the rights to use the Auto Windscreens brand name. See #Auto Windscreens (2011 onwards) Deloitte put the manufacturing facility in Chesterfield up for sale on 15 March 2011, with a guide price of £1m.

If no buyer was found for the site as a whole, then the machinery, stock and materials was to be auctioned off separately, over 28–30 March 2011.

=== Operations ===
At the time of administration, the company had 1,000 staff, and operated a fleet of 550 fitting vehicles and 68 fitting centres. Based in Chesterfield, there was also a distribution centre in Birmingham, and a customer services call centre. The company's clients were a mixture of private motorists, car insurers and fleet vehicle operators.

As the only replacement windscreen specialist in the United Kingdom with its own manufacturing facility, it could produce and stock its own small batches of standard replacement windows and windscreens to the same specifications as the original equipment manufacturers, as well as serve as an original manufacturer itself in specialist niche markets such as limousines, hearses and the police, as well as producing value added versions of standard products.

It also produced one-off products for the vintage and replica markets. The parent company of Trifords, Markerstudy Group, knew this was running at a loss and had to wait for the company to go into liquidation to remove all the debt before selecting which parts of the company it wanted to keep under the newly formed umbrella of Trifords Ltd.

=== Football sponsorship ===
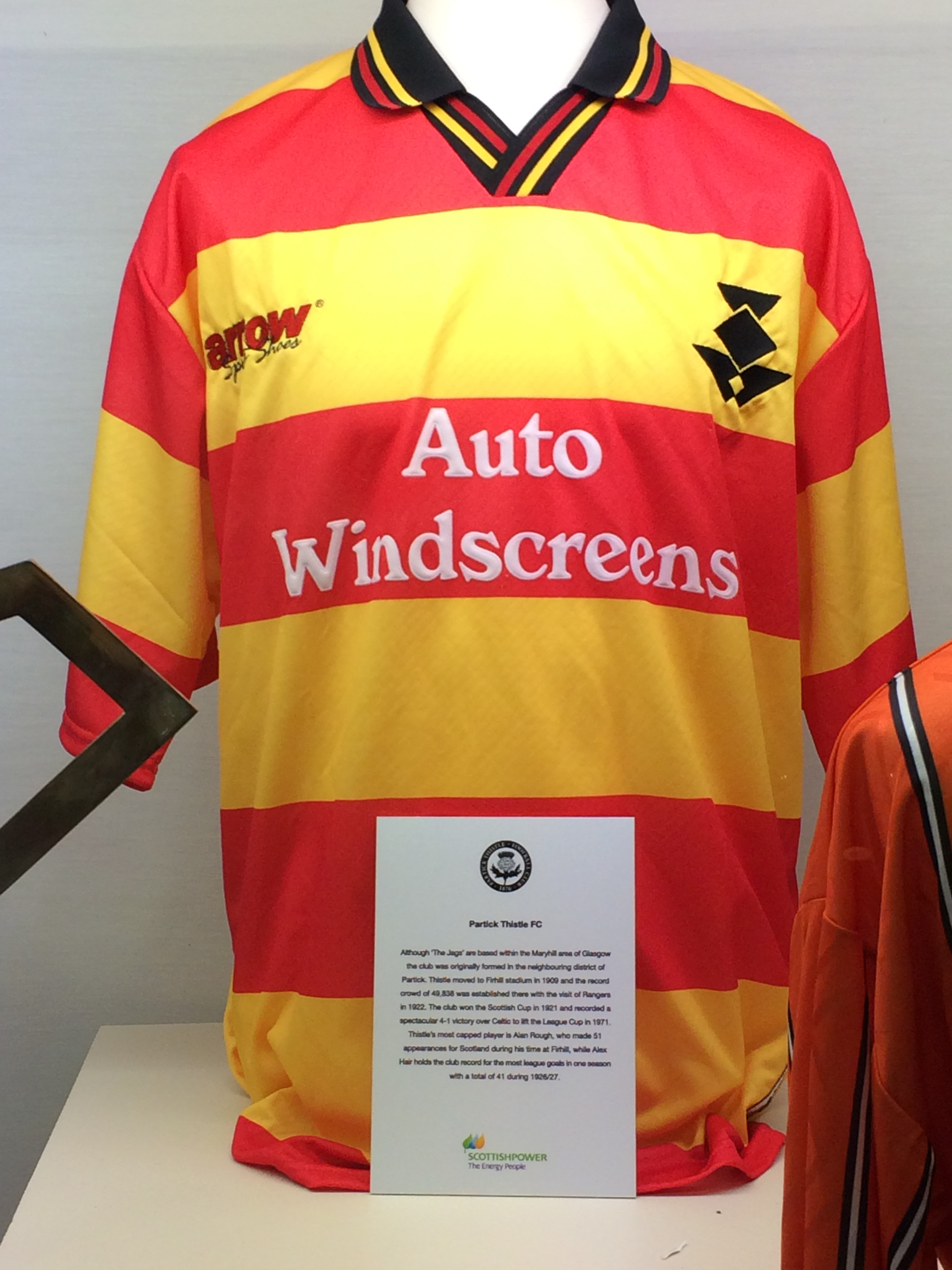
Auto Windscreen's sponsorship displayed on a 1998 home jersey of Partick Thistle, who they sponsored from 1997 to 1999.

The company was involved in English football sponsorship, acting as the title sponsor of The Football League's cup competition Football League Trophy for six seasons, from 1994–95 to 1999–00. For this period, the competition was officially called the Auto Windscreens Shield, although the name Auto Windscreens trophy was also common.

The company had replaced their main competitor Autoglass as the sponsor, with the competition previously known as the Autoglass Trophy. After 2000, the competition became the LDV Vans Trophy. The company was also a corporate partner (although not main shirt sponsor) of their local football team Chesterfield F.C. (The Spireites), signing deals in 2008 and 2010.

== Auto Windscreens (2011 onwards) ==
=== History ===
On 3 March 2011, it was announced that Trifords Ltd had purchased some parts of the former Auto Windscreens business including the rights to the brand name Auto Windscreens, and the freehold on three sites including the Chesterfield headquarters. The new company was incorporated as Trifords Limited (No. 07518924).

Trifords is part of the Markerstudy Group, a privately owned composite financial services organisation established in 2001 and based in Sundridge, Kent. The former sales and marketing director Nigel Davies was appointed managing director of the new company.

The trade press speculated the purchase had possibly happened as early as 25 February, based on the resurrection of the old Auto Windscreens website, but with updated company information.

=== Operations ===
The new company planned to initially create 250 jobs and grow the business under the already established and recognised brand, trading as Auto Windscreens. It would continue to serve both fleet, insurance and private customers, with the operation being complemented by the parent Markerstudy Group's existing core insurance businesses.

While the freehold to the old company's Chesterfield HQ was bought by Trifords, the new company was registered to an office in Crawley, West Sussex.

Auto Windscreens, still headquartered in Chesterfield, employs hundreds of people and has gradually rebuilt its customer base, with companies including Admiral, BGL Group, Sixt, Morrisons and Pendragon Contracts now using its services. It has a team of around three hundred technicians and added to its fitting centre network in March 2013, with new sites at Lingfield, Rochester and Guildford. More have since opened.

When the new company was established, Metrix service management software (now IFS Field Service Management) was implemented with the aim of improving efficiency and the customer journey. Personal digital devices (PDAs) for technicians and a mobile insurance application were also introduced to aid operations.

In August 2011, Auto Windscreens' technical training facility in Chesterfield re affirmed its GQA accreditation and two of its technicians took gold and silver at the UK Master Fitter in November 2012. On 17 May 2017, it was announced that Auto Windscreens would become the new shirt sponsor of AFC Rushden & Diamonds for the season of 2017/18.
