= 2007 Football League Trophy final =

2007 Football League Trophy Final
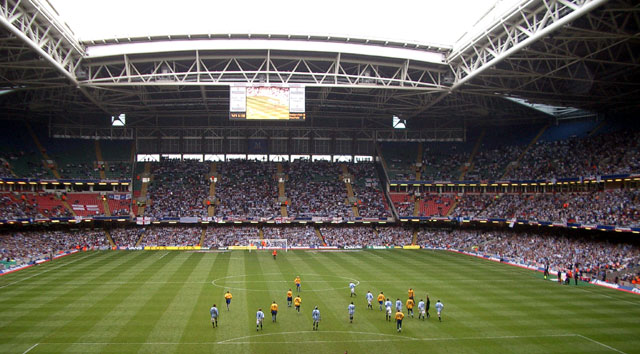
- Event: 2006–07 Football League Trophy
Bristol Rovers	Doncaster Rovers
2	3
- After extra time
- Date: 1 April 2007
- Venue: Millennium Stadium, Cardiff
- Referee: Graham Laws (Tyne & Wear)
- Attendance: 59,024

The 2007 Football League Trophy Final was the 24th final of the domestic football cup competition for teams from Football Leagues One and Two, the Football League Trophy. The final was played at the Millennium Stadium in Cardiff on 1 April 2007, the last time that the final would be played in the stadium. The match was contested by Bristol Rovers and Doncaster Rovers. Doncaster won the match 3–2 with Graeme Lee scoring the winning goal twenty minutes into extra-time.

== Match details ==
1 April 2007
13:00 BST

Bristol Rovers	2–3 (a.e.t.)	Doncaster Rovers
Walker 49' (pen.); Igoe 62'		Forte 1'; Heffernan 5'; Lee 110'

Millennium Stadium, Cardiff
Attendance: 59,024
Referee: Graham Laws (Tyne & Wear)

Bristol Rovers	Doncaster Rovers

GK	1	Steve Phillips
RB	32	Aaron Lescott
CB	6	Steve Elliott
CB	5	Craig Hinton
LB	11	Chris Carruthers
RM	4	Sammy Igoe	(substituted off) 100'
CM	7	Stuart Campbell
CM	20	Craig Disley
LM	26	Lewis Haldane	(substituted off) 107'
CF	9	Rickie Lambert
CF	10	Richard Walker	(substituted off) 100'
Substitutes:
GK	31	Mike Green
DF	15	Byron Anthony
MF	17	Andy Sandell	(substituted on) 100'
MF	22	Chris Lines	(substituted on) 107'
FW	19	Stuart Nicholson	(substituted on) 100'
Manager:
Paul Trollope

GK	1	Neil Sullivan
RB	2	James O'Connor
CB	11	Adam Lockwood
CB	5	Graeme Lee
LB	18	Sean McDaid
RM	26	James Coppinger	(yellow card) 86'
CM	19	Brian Stock	(substituted off) 102' (yellow card) 98'
CM	20	Paul Green
LM	17	Jonathan Forte	(substituted off) 87'
CF	23	Jason Price	(substituted off) 59'
CF	14	Paul Heffernan
Substitutes:
DF	3	Gareth Roberts
MF	8	Sean Thornton	(substituted on) 59'
FW	10	Bruce Dyer
MF	15	Mark Wilson	(substituted on) 102'
FW	7	Lewis Guy	(substituted on) 87'
Manager:
Sean O'Driscoll

Match rules

- 90 minutes
- 30 minutes of extra-time if necessary
- Penalty shoot-out if scores still level
- Five named substitutes
- Maximum of three substitutions
