= Martin Woods =

Scottish footballer

Personal information
- Full name: Martin Paul Woods
- Date of birth: 1 January 1986 (age 40)
- Place of birth: Airdrie, Scotland
- Height: 5 ft 11 in (1.80 m)
- Position: Midfielder

Senior career*
Years	Team	Apps	(Gls)
2003–2005	Leeds United	1	(0)
2005	→ Hartlepool United (loan)	6	(0)
2005–2006	Sunderland	7	(0)
2006–2007	Rotherham United	36	(4)
2007–2013	Doncaster Rovers	113	(7)
2008	→ Yeovil Town (loan)	3	(0)
2013–2014	Doncaster Rovers	4	(0)
2014	Barnsley	8	(0)
2014–2015	Ross County	27	(2)
2015	Shrewsbury Town	4	(0)
2015–2017	Ross County	55	(2)
2017–2018	Partick Thistle	18	(0)
2018–2019	Dundee	24	(2)
2020–2022	FC Halifax Town	69	(6)
2022–2023	Brackley Town	26	(4)
2023–2025	Boston United	50	(2)
2025–2026	Worksop Town	15	(0)
2026	King's Lynn Town	10	(0)

International career
- Scotland U17
- Scotland U19
2006	Scotland U21	2	(0)

Managerial career
- 2024: Boston United (interim manager)
- * Club domestic league appearances and goals as of 15:30, 24 August 2026 (UTC)

Martin Paul Woods (born 1 January 1986) is a Scottish footballer and coach who plays as a midfielder.

Woods career started at Leeds United and during his time there had a spell on loan at Hartlepool United. He then moved on to Sunderland, Rotherham United and Doncaster Rovers, and also spent time on loan at Yeovil Town. Following a short spell at Barnsley, Woods signed for Ross County in October 2014. He had two spells with County, interrupted by a year at Shrewsbury Town. Woods signed for Partick Thistle in October 2017, then joined Dundee in November 2018. After a brief hiatus, Woods played with FC Halifax Town for two seasons. He then played for Brackley Town for a season before joining Boston United where he had two eventful season, winning a promotion play-off and serving as the club's interim manager before abruptly departing. After Boston, Woods had spells with Worksop Town and King's Lynn Town.

== Football career ==
=== Leeds United ===
Woods started his career at the Leeds United academy, where he was capped by Scotland Youth. He made just one substitute appearance for the first team. In September 2004, he went on loan to Hartlepool United, making his professional debut in a 3–2 defeat away at Oldham Athletic on 11 September 2004. In October 2004, his loan was extended for a second month.

=== Sunderland ===
At the end of his Leeds contract, Woods turned down a new deal, in favour of joining Sunderland. He made seven appearances in the Premier League, but this included only one start. In May 2006, Woods was released by Sunderland.

=== Rotherham United ===
After leaving Sunderland, Woods signed for Rotherham United in League One. He scored his first senior goal, described as "spectacular" by BBC Sport, in a 3–2 defeat against Doncaster Rovers on 27 January 2007.

=== Doncaster Rovers ===
On 5 June 2007, Woods transferred to Doncaster Rovers, agreeing a four-year contract. He signed another long-term contract extension in September 2010.

Following his release in the summer of 2013, he had a final brief spell at the club on non-contract terms, before opting to join Barnsley.

=== Barnsley ===
Woods signed for Barnsley on a short-term deal at the end of the January 2014 transfer window.

=== Ross County ===
Woods signed for Scottish Premiership club Ross County in October 2014, agreeing a contract until the end of January 2015. He made his debut on 25 October 2014, as a substitute in a 2–2 draw against St Mirren. On 7 January 2015, Woods extended his contract until the end of the season.

=== Shrewsbury Town ===
At the end of the Scottish Premiership season, Woods joined newly promoted League One side Shrewsbury Town in May 2015.

=== Ross County (second spell) ===
On 31 August 2015, having asked to be released from his contract with Shrewsbury, Woods returned to Ross County, signing a two-year contract with the option of a third. This option was not exercised, and he left Ross County in the summer of 2017.

=== Partick Thistle ===
Woods signed for Partick Thistle in October 2017, on a contract to the end of the 2017–18 season. Thistle were relegated via the playoffs at the end of the season. Following that relegation, Woods was one of many players released by Thistle.

=== Dundee ===
Woods signed a short-term contract with Dundee in November 2018. He was released by the club at the end of the season.

=== FC Halifax Town ===
After a full season out, Woods signed with National League club FC Halifax Town. After two seasons with the club, Woods would leave Halifax in June 2022.

=== Brackley Town ===
On 7 October 2022, Woods signed for National League North club Brackley Town. He would leave the club at the end of the season after they reached the play-off final, and also assisting caretaker manager Gareth Dean.

=== Boston United ===
On 19 May 2023, Woods joined National League North side Boston United for the upcoming season. Woods was a regular starter for the Pilgrims in their successful campaign which ended with earning promotion to the National League through a surprise run through the National League North play-offs. On 27 May 2024, Woods signed a contract extension to keep him with the club for the following season.

==== Interim manager ====
On 31 October 2024, Woods was appointed as the interim manager of Boston United following the departure of previous manager Ian Culverhouse. Woods remained in the role until 19 November when Graham Coughlan was hired as first team manager, having drawn once and lost once as interim manager. Woods made his return as a player on 30 November following an injury, coming on as a substitute in a goalless draw against Ebbsfleet United. On 23 March 2025, following a disagreement with manager Coughlan, Woods announced via social media that he had left the Pilgrims.

=== Worksop Town ===
On 31 July 2025, Woods joined newly-promoted National League North club Worksop Town on a permanent deal.

=== King's Lynn Town ===
On 24 February 2026, Woods joined fellow National League North club King's Lynn Town.

== International career ==
Woods was capped by Scotland at schoolboy, under-17, under-19 and under-21 levels.

== Career statistics ==
As of 25 April 2026

Appearances and goals by club, season and competition
Club	Season	League			National Cup		League Cup		Other		Total	
Club	Season	Division	Apps	Goals	Apps	Goals	Apps	Goals	Apps	Goals	Apps	Goals
Leeds United	2004–05	Championship	1	0	0	0	0	0	0	0	1	0
Hartlepool United (loan)	2004–05	League One	6	0	0	0	1	0	1 (Note: Appearances in Football League Trophy)	0	8	0
Sunderland	2005–06	Premier League	7	0	0	0	1	0	0	0	8	0
Rotherham United	2006–07	League One	36	4	0	0	2	0	1	0	39	4
Doncaster Rovers	2007–08	League One	14	0	2	0	2	0	2	1	20	1
Doncaster Rovers	2008–09	Championship	41	2	4	0	1	0	0	0	46	2
Doncaster Rovers	2009–10	Championship	24	5	0	0	2	1	0	0	26	6
Doncaster Rovers	2010–11	Championship	15	1	0	0	0	0	0	0	15	1
Doncaster Rovers	2011–12	Championship	4	0	1	0	0	0	0	0	5	0
Doncaster Rovers	2012–13	League One	15	0	1	1	2	0	1	0	19	1
Doncaster Rovers	2013–14	Championship	4	0	1	0	0	0	0	0	5	0
Doncaster Rovers	Total		117	8	9	1	7	1	3	1	136	11
Yeovil Town (loan)	2007–08	League One	3	0	0	0	0	0	0	0	3	0
Barnsley	2013–14	Championship	8	0	0	0	0	0	0	0	8	0
Ross County	2014–15	Scottish Premiership	27	2	1	0	0	0	0	0	28	2
Shrewsbury Town	2015–16	League One	4	0	0	0	1	0	0	0	5	0
Ross County	2015–16	Scottish Premiership	26	1	2	0	3	1	0	0	31	2
Ross County	2016–17	Scottish Premiership	29	1	2	0	4	0	0	0	35	1
Ross County	Total		55	2	4	0	7	1	0	0	66	3
Partick Thistle	2017–18	Scottish Premiership	18	0	1	0	0	0	2 (Note: Appearances in Scottish Premiership play-offs)	0	21	0
Dundee	2018–19	Scottish Premiership	24	2	1	0	0	0	0	0	25	2
FC Halifax Town	2020–21	National League	36	4	1	0	0	0	2 (Note: Appearances in FA Trophy)	0	39	4
FC Halifax Town	2021–22	National League	33	2	2	0	0	0	4 (Note: Appearances in the FA Trophy and National League Play-offs)	0	39	2
FC Halifax Town	Total		69	6	3	0	0	0	6	0	78	6
Brackley Town	2022–23	National League North	26	4	0	0	0	0	0	0	26	4
Boston United	2023–24	National League North	32	2	2	1	0	0	4 (Note: One appearance in FA Trophy, three appearances in National League North play-offs)	0	38	3
Boston United	2024–25	National League	18	0	0	0	0	0	1	0	19	0
Boston United	Total		50	2	2	1	0	0	5	0	57	3
Worksop Town	2025–26	National League North	15	0	1	0	0	0	0	0	16	0
King's Lynn Town	2025–26	National League North	10	0	0	0	0	0	0	0	10	0
Career total			476	30	22	2	19	2	17	1	535	35

== Honours ==
Doncaster Rovers

- Football League One: 2012–13

Ross County

- Scottish League Cup: 2015–16

Boston United

- National League North play-offs: 2024
