= Tom Partington =

Tom Partington may refer to

- Tom Partington (footballer) (1902-?), English footballer, see List of Bury F.C. players (1–24 appearances)
- Tom Partington (Australian musician), member of The Rions
- Tom Partington (American musician), see James Joyce's The Dead
- Tom Partington (racewalker), see 2016 British Indoor Athletics Championships
- Tom Partington (sailor), International 14 World Championships
