= Sean McDaid =

Footballer (born 1986)

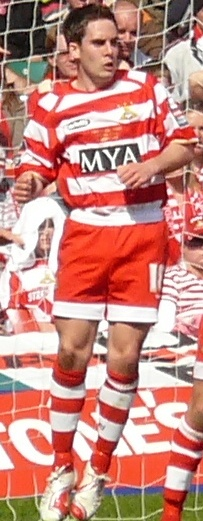
- McDaid with Doncaster Rovers

Personal information
- Full name: Sean Andrew McDaid
- Date of birth: 6 March 1986 (age 40)
- Place of birth: Harrogate, England
- Position: Defender

Youth career
- 2004–2005: Leeds United

Senior career*
Years	Team	Apps	(Gls)
2005–2010	Doncaster Rovers	103	(2)
2010–2011	Carlisle United	12	(0)
Total		115	(2)

International career
- Scotland U17
- Scotland U18
- Scotland U19
- Scotland U20
- * Club domestic league appearances and goals

Sean Andrew McDaid (born 6 March 1986) is a former professional footballer who played for Leeds United, Doncaster Rovers and Carlisle United before having his career cut short by injury in March 2011. Born in England, he represented Scotland internationally at youth levels U17 through U20. Since retiring from playing, McDaid has pursued a career in sports management.

== Club career ==
=== Doncaster Rovers ===
Even though McDaid had played Youth Internationals for Scotland and Reserve team football from a young age during his ten years at Leeds United he was a relative unknown when he signed for Doncaster on a free transfer in 2005 from Leeds United. He made good progress and was highly regarded at the club and quickly became one of the most promising youngsters in the Football League. In 2005–2006 season McDaid was voted the club's Players' Player of the Year, Young Player of the Year and Supporters Branch Player of the Year in his first season with the club. In his five years at the club he has won the Football League Trophy and promotion to the Championship.

He played at left-back, was adapt enough to be employed in a secondary role in central midfield. His first goal for Doncaster came against Sven-Göran Eriksson's Manchester City followed up by his first league goal in April 2008, the first strike in a 2–0 victory over Swindon Town. Two weeks later, he was out for the remainder of the season with a dislocated kneecap injury., As McDaid fought back with months of rehabilitation for his knee injury, McDaid was then involved in 11 Match day squads and his first appearance for Rovers since their promotion to the Championship in 2008, against MiddlesbrougH in January 2010. McDaid departed Rovers in May 2010.

=== Carlisle United ===
On 29 May 2010, McDaid signed for Carlisle United on a 1-year contract with option to extend this deal by a further year if he made 30 starts in the 2010/11 season. McDaid's season was cut short by a different long-term knee injury in October 2010. Mcdaid had played in every game leading up to that point in the season and had been part of a very successful start to the season for Carlisle United

On 10 March 2011, McDaid announced his retirement from football aged 25, due to this new injury problem on the advice of Knee Specialists. McDaid played 115 games as a Professional Footballer.

== International career ==
McDaid represented Scotland at every level up to under-20.

== Honours ==
Doncaster Rovers

- Football League Trophy: 2006–07
