= 2006–07 Football League Trophy =

Johnstone's Paint Trophy

Tournament details
- Country: England; Wales
- Teams: 48

Final positions
- Champions: Doncaster Rovers
- Runners-up: Bristol Rovers

The 2006–07 Football League Trophy, known as the 2006–07 Johnstone's Paint Trophy for sponsorship reasons, was the 26th staging of the Football League Trophy, a knockout competition for English football clubs in Leagues One and Two. The winners were Doncaster Rovers from League One and the runners-up were Bristol Rovers from League Two.

The competition began on 17 October 2006 and ended with the final on 1 April 2007. The final was the last to take place at Millennium Stadium in Cardiff. In the first round, there are four sections: Northern Section–West, Northern Section–East, Southern Section–West and Southern Section–East. In the second round this narrows to simply a Northern and a Southern section, whereupon each section gradually eliminates teams in knock-out fashion until each has a winning finalist. At this point, the two winning finalists face each other in the combined final for the honour of the trophy.

Swansea City were the defending champions, but lost to Peterborough United in the second round.

Doncaster Rovers won the final, beating Bristol Rovers 3–2 after extra time, having been 2–0 up after just 5 minutes before Bristol Rovers scored twice in the second half to make the score 2–2 after 90 minutes.

== First round ==
Sixteen teams received byes to the second round. The other remaining teams start in a single-legged knockout. Should the scores be level after 90 minutes, the match entered a penalty shootout phase, with no extra-time being played.

=== Northern Section ===
Tie no	Home team	Score	Away team	Attendance
West
1	Accrington Stanley	1 – 1	Carlisle United	850
Accrington Stanley won 3–1 on penalties
2	Bury	0 – 2	Tranmere Rovers	1,093
3	Macclesfield Town	0 – 1	Stockport County	1,792
4	Wrexham	1 – 1	Rochdale	1,209
Rochdale won 5–3 on penalties
East
5	Bradford City	1 – 2	Scunthorpe United	1,936
6	Hartlepool United	3 – 1	Rotherham United	1,832
7	Huddersfield Town	1 – 2	Doncaster Rovers	3,629
8	Lincoln City	0 – 0	Grimsby Town	2,019
Grimsby Town won 5–3 on penalties

Byes: Blackpool, Chester City, Chesterfield, Crewe Alexandra, Darlington, Mansfield Town, Oldham Athletic, and Port Vale.

=== Southern Section ===
Tie no	Home team	Score	Away team	Attendance
West
1	Bristol Rovers	1 – 0	Torquay United	2,672
2	Hereford United	1 – 2	Shrewsbury Town	2,007
3	Walsall	1 – 1	Swansea City	2,557
Swansea City won 4–3 on penalties
4	Wycombe Wanderers	1 – 0	Swindon Town	1,583
East
1	Brighton & Hove Albion	2 – 0	Boston United	1,740
2	Gillingham	1 – 2	Nottingham Forest	1,817
3	Northampton Town	0 – 0	Brentford	2,088
Brentford won 4–2 on penalties
4	Notts County	0 – 1	Barnet	1,291

Byes: Bournemouth, Bristol City, Cheltenham Town, Leyton Orient, Millwall, Milton Keynes Dons, Peterborough United, Yeovil Town.

== Second round ==
In the second round, the sixteen winning teams from the first round were joined by the teams with byes. Again, there were eight one-legged matches in each section (North and South), with a penalty shootout if a draw occurred after 90 minutes.

=== Northern Section ===
Tie no	Home team	Score	Away team	Attendance
1	Accrington Stanley	4 – 4	Blackpool	1,344
Accrington Stanley won 4–2 on penalties
2	Chester City	3 – 0	Stockport County	1,229
3	Hartlepool United	1 – 3	Doncaster Rovers	1,853
4	Mansfield Town	3 – 0	Grimsby Town	1,761
5	Oldham Athletic	0 – 1	Chesterfield	2,118
6	Rochdale	1 – 1	Crewe Alexandra	1,148
Crewe Alexandra won 2–0 on penalties
7	Scunthorpe United	0 – 0	Port Vale	3,421
Port Vale won 5–3 on penalties
8	Tranmere Rovers	0 – 1	Darlington	2,036

=== Southern Section ===
Tie no	Home team	Score	Away team	Attendance
1	Brighton & Hove Albion	4 – 1	Milton Keynes Dons	2,774
2	Cheltenham Town	3 – 2	Barnet	964
3	Leyton Orient	1 – 3	Bristol City	1,118
4	Millwall	2 – 0	Bournemouth	1,905
5	Nottingham Forest	2 – 1	Brentford	2,031
6	Peterborough United	1 – 0	Swansea City	1,432
7	Shrewsbury Town	2 – 1	Yeovil Town	1,759
8	Wycombe Wanderers	0 – 2	Bristol Rovers	1,314

== Area quarter-finals ==
In the third round, the winning teams from the second round play in eight one-legged matches, four in each section (North and South). Again, a penalty shootout followed if the match was drawn after 90 minutes. Matches were played on 28 November and 29 November 2006.

=== Northern Section ===
Tie no	Home team	Score	Away team	Attendance
1	Chesterfield	4 – 4	Chester City	2,414
Chesterfield won 3–1 on penalties
2	Darlington	1 – 0	Mansfield Town	2,059
3	Doncaster Rovers	2 – 0	Accrington Stanley	3,209
4	Port Vale	2 – 3	Crewe Alexandra	4,694

=== Southern Section ===
Tie no	Home team	Score	Away team	Attendance
1	Bristol Rovers	1 – 0	Peterborough United	3,621
2	Cheltenham Town	2 – 3	Shrewsbury Town	1,379
3	Millwall	1 – 1	Brighton & Hove Albion	3,659
Brighton & Hove Albion won 3–2 on penalties
4	Nottingham Forest	2 – 2	Bristol City	4,107
Bristol City won 4–2 on penalties

== Area semi-finals ==
Matches were played on 8 January 2007.

=== Northern Section ===
Tie no	Home team	Score	Away team	Attendance
1	Chesterfield	2 – 4	Crewe Alexandra	3,414
2	Doncaster Rovers	2 – 0	Darlington	8,009

=== Southern Section ===
Tie no	Home team	Score	Away team	Attendance
1	Bristol City	2 – 0	Brighton & Hove Albion	6,485
2	Shrewsbury Town	0 – 1	Bristol Rovers	3,199

== Area finals ==
=== Northern Area final ===
30 January 2007
19:45

Crewe Alexandra	3 – 3	Doncaster Rovers
Moss 51'; Lowe 63'; Varney 86'		Heffernan 29' (pen.); Stock 40'; Heffernan 74'

Alexandra Stadium, Crewe
Attendance: 4,631
Referee: Clive Oliver (Northumberland)

12 February 2007
19:45

Doncaster Rovers	3 – 2	Crewe Alexandra
Heffernan 63'; Heffernan 83' (pen.); Price 89'		Varney 32'; Lowe 36'

Keepmoat Stadium, Doncaster
Attendance: 12,561
Referee: Trevor Kettle (Berkshire)
- Doncaster Rovers won 6–5 on aggregate and progressed to the final.

=== Southern Area final ===
The Southern Area final produced the first Bristol derby played in over five years.

21 February 2007
19:45

Bristol City	0 – 0	Bristol Rovers

Ashton Gate, Bristol
Attendance: 18,730
Referee: Kevin Wright (Cambridgeshire)

27 February 2007
19:45

Bristol Rovers	1 – 0	Bristol City
Lambert 65'

Memorial Stadium, Bristol
Attendance: 11,530
Referee: Andy D'Urso (Essex)
- Bristol Rovers won 1–0 on aggregate and progressed to the final.

== Final ==
The 2007 final was the last major Football Association or Football League final to be held at the Millennium Stadium in Cardiff. All subsequent finals were held at Wembley Stadium in London.

1 April 2007
13:00

Bristol Rovers	2 – 3 (a.e.t.)	Doncaster Rovers
Walker 49' (pen.); Igoe 62'	Report	Forte 1'; Heffernan 5'; Lee 110'

Millennium Stadium, Cardiff
Attendance: 59,024
Referee: Graham Laws (Northumberland)

== Sources ==
- Rollin, Glenda; Rollin, Jack, eds. (2007). Sky Sports Football Yearbook 2007–2008. London: Headline. pp. 605–608. ISBN 978-0-7553-1664-9.
- "Football League Trophy 2006/2007". Soccerbase. Racing Post. Archived from the original on 30 January 2010.
