= 2015–16 Ross County F.C. season =

Ross County
2015–16 season
- Chairman: Roy MacGregor
- Manager: Jim McIntyre
- Stadium: Victoria Park
- Premiership: Sixth place
- League Cup: Winners
- Scottish Cup: Quarter Final
- Top goalscorer: League: Liam Boyce (15); All: Liam Boyce (20)
- Highest home attendance: 6,042 vs Celtic; Scottish Premiership; 8 November 2015
- Lowest home attendance: 1,341 vs Falkirk; League Cup; 22 September 2015
- Average home league attendance: 4,287
Home colours	Away colours

The 2015–16 season was the club's 3rd season in the Scottish Premiership and their fourth consecutive appearance in the top flight of Scottish football. Ross County also competed in the League Cup and the Scottish Cup.

On 13 March 2016, Ross County won their first ever major trophy when they beat Hibernian 2–1 in the final of the 2015–16 Scottish League Cup.

== Results and fixtures ==
Win Draw Loss Postponed

=== Pre season / Friendlies ===
8 July 2015 Friendly	Nairn County	1–2	Ross County	Nairn
19:30	Wallace 77'	Report	Graham 41'; Kyle MacLeod 57'	Stadium: Station Park

11 July 2015 Friendly	Elgin City	3–5	Ross County	Elgin
15:00	Brian Cameron 28', 42'; Mark Nicolson 33'		Graham 9'; Gardyne 29'; Curran 61'; De Vita 63'; Reckord 90' (pen.)	Stadium: Borough Briggs

14 July 2015 Friendly	Soroksár SC	1–1	Ross County	Budapest, Hungary
15:00				Stadium: Sporttelep Mihály Szamosi

18 July 2015 Friendly	Szolnoki MÁV FC	2–0	Ross County	Szolnok, Hungary
15:00				Stadium: Tiszaligeti Stadion

18 July 2015 Friendly	Ross County	0–2	NEC Nijmegen	Victoria Park
15:00			Emilsson 67', 71'	Referee: Don Robertson

=== Scottish Premiership ===
1 August 2015 1	Celtic	2–0	Ross County	Celtic Park
12:30	Griffiths 4' (pen.); Johansen 35'	Report		Attendance: 45,197; Referee: Collum

8 August 2015 2	Ross County	2–0	Hamilton Academical	Victoria Park
15:00	Curran 10', 41'	BBC Report		Attendance: 3,479; Referee: Dallas

11 August 2015 3	St Johnstone	1–1	Ross County	McDiarmid Park
19:45	Cummins 52'	BBC Report	Curran 17'	Attendance: 3,065; Referee: Muir

15 August 2015 4	Ross County	1–2	Heart of Midlothian	Victoria Park
15:00	Boyce 39' (pen.)	BBC Report	Sow 11'; Öztürk 14'	Attendance: 4,806; Referee: Madden

22 August 2015 5	Kilmarnock	0–4	Ross County	Rugby Park
15:00		BBC Report	Boyce 2', 29'; Franks 4'; Davies 35'	Attendance: 3,604; Referee: Robertson

29 August 2015 6	Ross County	2–1	Dundee United	Victoria Park
15:00	Boyce 17' (pen.); Davies 28'	BBC Report	Dillon 61'	Attendance: 4,014; Referee: Thomson

12 September 2015 7	Motherwell	1–1	Ross County	Fir Park
15:00	Moult 90+1'	BBC Report	Gardyne 33'	Attendance: 3,545; Referee: Robertson

19 September 2015 8	Ross County	1–0	Partick Thistle	Victoria Park
15:00	Boyce 18'	BBC Report		Attendance: 3,531; Referee: Aitken

26 September 2015 9	Dundee	3–3	Ross County	Dens Park
15:00	Stewart 20'; Loy 54' (pen.), 69'	BBC Report	Boyce 19'; McPake 37' (o.g.); Gardyne 43'; Davies (yellow card) 53' (yellow-red card)	Attendance: 5,128; Referee: Thomson

3 October 2015 10	Ross County	1–2	Inverness Caledonian Thistle	Victoria Park
15:00	Boyce 90+1'	BBC Report	Storey 42'; Vincent 45'	Attendance: 5,473; Referee: Collum

16 October 2015 11	Ross County	2–0	Aberdeen	Victoria Park
15:00	Graham 36', 49'	BBC Report		Attendance: 5,543; Referee: Thomson

24 October 2015 12	Heart of Midlothian	2–0	Ross County	Tynecastle Stadium
15:00	Paterson 15'; Augustyn (red card) 48'; Sow 67'	BBC Report		Attendance: 16,264; Referee: Muir

31 October 2015 13	Dundee United	1–0	Ross County	Tannadice Park
15:00	McKay 81' (pen.)	BBC Report		Attendance: 5,549; Referee: Robertson

8 November 2015 14	Ross County	1–4	Celtic	Victoria Park
	Dingwall 59'	BBC Report	Rogić 38'; Griffiths 54', 56'; Bitton 75'	Attendance: 6,042; Referee: Clancy

21 November 2015 15	Ross County	3–0	Motherwell	Victoria Park
15:00	Curran 22'; Dingwall 69'; Boyce 90+2' (pen.)	BBC Report		Attendance: 3,378; Referee: Allan

28 November 2015 16	Aberdeen	3–1	Ross County	Pittodrie Stadium
15:00	Rooney 51'; Hayes 53'; McGinn 80'	BBC Report	Curran 14'	Attendance: 10,843; Referee: Beaton

5 December 2015 17	Ross County	2–3	St Johnstone	Victoria Park
15:00	Boyce 68'; Davidson 88' (Own goal)	BBC Report	Wotherspoon 3', 43'; Mackay 88'	Attendance: 3,229; Referee: Clancy

12 December 2015 18	Hamilton Academical	1–3	Ross County	New Douglas Park
15:00	Kurtaj 26'	BBC Report	Curran 58'; Murdoch 86'; Boyce 68'	Attendance: 2,120; Referee: Collum

19 December 2015 19	Partick Thistle	1–0	Ross County	Firhill Stadium
15:00	Andrew Davies 52' (Own goal)	BBC Report		Attendance: 2,762; Referee: Dallas

26 December 2015 20	Ross County	5–2	Dundee	Victoria Park
15:00	Boyce 29', 69', 85'; Gardyne 55'; Irvine 60'	BBC Report	Hemmings 5', 53'	Attendance: 3,687; Referee: Allan

29 December 2015 21	Ross County	3–2	Kilmarnock	Victoria Park
19:45	Curran 12'; Gardyne 50', 56'	Report	Obadeyi 33'; Magennis 48'	Attendance: 3,518; Referee: McLean

2 January 2016 22	Inverness Caledonian Thistle	2–0	Ross County	Caledonian Stadium
15:00	Storey 26'; Tansey 45+2'	BBC Report		Attendance: 5,388; Referee: Beaton

17 January 2016 23	Ross County	2–3	Aberdeen	Victoria Park
12:15	McShane 27', 82'	BBC Report	Reynolds (yellow card) 26' (red card); Rooney 33' (pen.); Logan 36', 60'	Attendance: 4,107; Referee: Allan

23 January 2016 24	Motherwell	1–2	Ross County	Fir Park
15:00	Pearson 87'	BBC Report	Irvine 20'; Graham 69'	Attendance: 3,279; Referee: Collum

10 February 2016 25	Ross County	0–3	Heart of Midlothian	Victoria Park
19:45			Walker 53'; Dauda 86', 89'	Attendance: 3,391; Referee: McLean

13 February 2016 26	Celtic	2–0	Ross County	Celtic Park
15:00	Sviatchenko (yellow card) 40'; Griffiths 45+1'; Boyata 57'; Rogić (yellow card) 87'	Report	Robertson (yellow card) 23'; Gardyne (yellow card) 31'	Attendance: 42,550; Referee: (Scotland) Kevin Clancy

20 February 2016 27	Ross County	2–1	Hamilton Academical	Victoria Park
15:00	Schalk 45+1'; Reckford (red card) 47'; Davies (yellow card) 73'; McShane 78'; Quinn (yellow card) 84'		Jesús García Tena (yellow card) 13'; Kurakins (yellow card) 45'; Imrie 66'	Attendance: 3,059; Referee: (Scotland) Greg Aitken

27 February 2016 28	Ross County	0–3	Dundee United	Victoria Park
15:00	Schalk (yellow card) 17'; Woods (yellow card) 61'	Report	Paton 10'; Gunning (yellow card) 17'; Donaldson (yellow card) 30'; Mckay 71'; Dow 76'	Attendance: 3,564; Referee: (Scotland) John Beaton

1 March 2016 29	Kilmarnock	0–2	Ross County	Rugby Park
19:45		Report	Schalk 8'; Fraser (yellow card) 28'; Goodwillie (yellow card) 58'; Davies (yellow card) 75'; Woods (yellow card) 82'; Graham 90'	Attendance: 2,633; Referee: (Scotland) Stephen Finnie

16 March 2016 30	St Johnstone	1–1	Ross County	McDiarmid Park
19:45	Wotherspoon 11'; Lappin (yellow card) 66'	Report	Graham 65' (pen.)	Attendance: 2,501; Referee: (Scotland) Steven McLean (referee)

19 March 2016 31	Ross County	0–3	Inverness Caledonian Thistle	Victoria Park
15:00	Foster (yellow card) 52'; Boyce (yellow card) 64'; Fraser (yellow card) 70'	Report	Polworth 32'; Draper 37'; Vigurs (yellow card) 42'; Storey 48'	Attendance: 5,912; Referee: (Scotland) Bobby Madden

2 April 2016 32	Dundee	5–2	Ross County	Dens Park
15:00	Stewart 7' 90+2'; Hemmings 9'; Loy 38'; Konrad (yellow card) 45+2'; Holt (yellow card) 76'; Wighton 85'	Report	Davies 15'; Woods (yellow card) 16'; Foster (yellow card) 41'; Schalk 45'	Attendance: 5,095; Referee: (Scotland) Andrew Dallas

9 April 2016 33	Ross County	1–0	Partick Thistle	Victoria Park
15:00	Schalk 14'; Murdoch (yellow card) 45'	Report	Miller (yellow card) 75'; Lawless (yellow card) 82'; Seaborne (yellow card) 84'	Attendance: 3,603; Referee: (Scotland) Nick Walsh

24 April 2016 34	Celtic	1–1	Ross County	Celtic Park
15:00	Griffiths 23'; Lustig (yellow card) 87'	Report	Murdoch 64' (yellow card) 68'; De Vita (yellow card) 86'	Attendance: 41,396; Referee: (Scotland) Dom Robertson

30 April 2016 35	Ross County	0–1	St Johnstone	Victoria Park
15:00	Quinn (yellow card) 33'	Report	Craig (yellow card) 25'; MacLean 56'; Shaughnessy (yellow card) 88'	Attendance: 3,329; Referee: (Scotland) Stephen Finnie

7 May 2016 36	Heart of Midlothian	1–1	Ross County	Tynecastle Stadium
15:00	Souttar (yellow card) 76'; Juanma 84'	Report	Woods (yellow card) 65'; Goodwillie 88'	Attendance: 15,438; Referee: (Scotland) Nick Walsh

11 May 2016 37	Ross County	1–3	Motherwell	Victoria Park
19:45	Boyce 69'	Report	Pearson 4', 90+2'; Lasley 16'	Attendance: 2,976; Referee: John Beaton

15 May 2016 38	Aberdeen	0–4	Ross County	Pittodrie Stadium
12:30		BBC Report	Graham 23' (pen.); Gardyne (yellow card) 37'; Schalk 45'; Boyce 68'; Woods 78'	Attendance: 10,003; Referee: Collum

=== Scottish League Cup ===
25 August 2015 Second Round	Ross County	2–0	Ayr United	Victoria Park
19:45	Boyce 3'; Gardyne 50'	BBC Report		Attendance: 1,743; Referee: Craig Charleston

22 September 2015 Third Round	Ross County	7–0	Falkirk	Victoria Park
19:45	Boyce 30', 35', 40'; De Vita 46'; Franks 54'; Graham 58'; Holden 81'	BBC Report		Attendance: 1,341; Referee: Stephen Finnie

27 October 2015 Quarter Final	Inverness Caledonian Thistle	1–2	Ross County	Caledonian Stadium
19:05	Tansey 78'	BBC Report	Irvine 41'; Gardyne 48'	Attendance: 3,004; Referee: McLean

31 January 2016 Semi Final	Ross County	3–1	Celtic	Hampden Park
15:00	Woods 15' (pen.); Quinn 48'; Schalk 63'	BBC Report	Mackay-Steven 1'	Attendance: 22,130; Referee: Thomson

13 March 2016 Final	Hibernian	1–2	Ross County	Hampden Park
15:00	Fontaine 45'; Bartley (yellow card) 63'; McGinn (yellow card) 84'	Report	Gardyne 25'; Schalk 90'	Attendance: 38,796; Referee: (Scotland) Kevin Clancy

=== Scottish Cup ===
9 January 2016 Fourth round	Dunfermline Athletic	2–2	Ross County	East End Park
15:00	El Bakhtaoui 15'; McKay 56'	BBC Report	Schalk 4'; Graham 27' (pen.)	Attendance: 3,439; Referee: Muir

12 January 2016 Fourth round replay	Ross County	1–0	Dunfermline Athletic	Victoria Park
19:45	De Vita 70'	BBC Report		Attendance: 2,041; Referee: Muir

6 February 2016 Fifth round	Ross County	4–2	Linlithgow Rose	Victoria Park
15:00	Quinn 4'; Graham 58', 78'; Schalk 63'	BBC Report	Reckord 44' (Own goal); MacLennan 76'	Attendance: 2,208; Referee: Anderson

5 March 2016 Quarter-finals	Ross County	2–3	Dundee United	Victoria Park
15:00	Boyce 24'; Graham 60' (pen.)	BBC Sport Report	Anier 57', 65'; Durnan (red card) 59'; McKay 89'	Attendance: 3,052; Referee: Craig Thomson

== Squad statistics ==
During the 2015–16 season, Ross County used twenty-seven different players in competitive games. The table below shows the number of appearances and goals scored by each player.

=== Appearances ===
No.	Pos	Nat	Player	Total		Premiership		League Cup		Scottish Cup	
No.	Pos	Nat	Player	Apps	Goals	Apps	Goals	Apps	Goals	Apps	Goals
1	GK	(Scotland) SCO	Scott Fox	31	0	27	0	2	0	2	0
2	DF	(Scotland) SCO	Marcus Fraser	37	0	29+0	0	4	0	4	0
3	DF	(England) ENG	Jamie Reckord	21	0	14+2	0	3	0	2	0
5	DF	(Scotland) SCO	Scott Boyd	19	0	12+3	0	2	0	2	0
6	DF	(Scotland) SCO	Chris Robertson	26	0	21+2	0	2	0	1	0
7	FW	(Scotland) SCO	Michael Gardyne	43	8	34+1	5	4	3	3+1	0
8	MF	(Scotland) SCO	Ian McShane	26	3	16+2	3	3+1	0	1+3	0
9	FW	(Scotland) SCO	Brian Graham	31	11	10+13	6	2+2	1	4	4
10	FW	(Northern Ireland) NIR	Liam Boyce	42	20	29+6	15	4+1	4	1+1	1
11	FW	(England) ENG	Craig Curran	20	7	15+4	7	1	0	0	0
12	DF	(Scotland) SCO	Richard Foster	40	0	28+4	0	3+1	0	2+2	0
13	GK	(United States) USA	Chris Konopka	0	0	0	0	0	0	0	0
14	DF	(Scotland) SCO	Darren Holden	2	1	0	0	0+2	1	0	0
15	DF	(England) ENG	Andrew Davies	38	3	31	3	4	0	3	0
17	FW	(England) ENG	Jonathan Franks	36	2	18+11	1	1+2	1	3+1	0
18	MF	(Scotland) SCO	Stewart Murdoch	34	2	14+15	2	2+2	0	1	0
19	MF	(Scotland) SCO	Tony Dingwall	15	2	5+7	2	1+2	0	0	0
21	GK	(England) ENG	Gary Woods	16	0	11+1	0	2	0	2	0
23	FW	(Netherlands) NED	Alex Schalk	31	9	14+10	5	2+1	2	3+1	2
24	MF	(Italy) ITA	Raffaele De Vita	25	2	8+11	0	2	1	2+2	1
25	FW	(Scotland) SCO	David Goodwillie	9	1	4+5	1	0	0	0	0
26	MF	(Scotland) SCO	Martin Woods	31	2	23+3	1	3	1	2	0
31	GK	(England) ENG	James Severn	0	0	0	0	0	0	0	0
36	MF	(Australia) AUS	Jackson Irvine	45	3	34+2	2	5	1	4	0
41	GK	(England) ENG	Mark Foden	0	0	0	0	0	0	0	0
43	MF	(Scotland) SCO	Paul Quinn	18	2	14+0	0	2	1	2	1
44	DF	(Scotland) SCO	Christopher McLaughlin	2	0	2	0	0	0	0	0
53	MF	(Scotland) SCO	Greg Morrison	2	0	0+2	0	0	0	0	0
Players who left the club during the 2015–16 season
4	MF	(Scotland) SCO	Rocco Quinn	12	0	5+5	0	0+1	0	0+1	0
21	GK	(Austria) AUT	Daniel Bachmann	2	0	0+1	0	1	0	0	0

=== Goalscorers ===
Ranking	Nation	Number	Name	Scottish Premiership	League Cup	Scottish Cup	Total
1	(Northern Ireland)	10	Liam Boyce	15	4	1	20
2	(Scotland)	9	Brian Graham	6	1	4	11
3	(Netherlands)	23	Alex Schalk	5	2	2	9
4	(Scotland)	7	Michael Gardyne	5	3	0	8
5	(England)	11	Craig Curran	7	0	0	7
6	(Scotland)	8	Ian McShane	3	0	0	3
=	(England)	15	Andrew Davies	3	0	0	3
=	(Australia)	36	Jackson Irvine	2	1	0	3
9	(England)	17	Jonathan Franks	1	1	0	2
=	(Scotland)	18	Stewart Murdoch	2	0	0	2
=	(Scotland)	19	Tony Dingwall	2	0	0	2
=	(Italy)	24	Raffaele De Vita	0	1	1	2
=	(Scotland)	26	Martin Woods	1	1	0	2
=	(Scotland)	43	Paul Quinn	0	1	1	2
15	(Scotland)	25	David Goodwillie	1	0	0	1
=	(Scotland)	14	Darren Holden	0	1	0	1
			Own goal	2	0	0	2
			TOTALS	55	16	9	80

=== Disciplinary record ===
As of 6 February 2016

Number	Nation	Position	Name	Premiership		League Cup		Scottish Cup		Total	
Number	Nation	Position	Name	Yellow card	Red card	Yellow card	Red card	Yellow card	Red card	Yellow card	Red card
1	(Scotland)	GK	Scott Fox	1	0	0	0	0	0	1	0
2	(Scotland)	DF	Marcus Fraser	1	0	1	0	1	0	3	0
3	(England)	DF	Jamie Reckord	1	0	0	0	1	0	2	0
4	(Scotland)	MF	Rocco Quinn	2	0	0	0	0	0	2	0
5	(Scotland)	DF	Scott Boyd	2	0	0	0	1	0	3	0
6	(Scotland)	DF	Chris Robertson	3	0	0	0	0	0	3	0
8	(Scotland)	MF	Ian McShane	0	0	1	0	0	0	1	0
9	(Scotland)	FW	Brian Graham	1	0	0	0	0	0	1	0
10	(Northern Ireland)	FW	Liam Boyce	1	0	0	0	0	0	1	0
11	(England)	FW	Craig Curran	4	0	0	0	0	0	4	0
12	(Scotland)	DF	Richard Foster	5	0	1	0	0	0	6	0
15	(England)	DF	Andrew Davies	5	1	1	0	0	0	6	1
18	(Scotland)	MF	Stewart Murdoch	1	0	1	0	0	0	2	0
19	(Scotland)	MF	Tony Dingwall	1	0	0	0	0	0	1	0
24	(Italy)	MF	Raffaele De Vita	0	0	0	0	1	0	1	0
26	(Scotland)	MF	Martin Woods	2	0	2	0	1	0	5	0
36	(Australia)	MF	Jackson Irvine	4	0	0	0	0	0	4	0
			TOTALS	34	0	7	0	5	0	46	0

== Team statistics ==
=== League table ===
Pos	Team	Pld	W	D	L	GF	GA	GD	Pts	Qualification or relegation (Note: Teams play each other three times (33 matches), before the league is split into two groups (the top six and the bottom six).)
4	St Johnstone	38	16	8	14	58	55	+3	56	
5	Motherwell	38	15	5	18	47	63	−16	50	
6	Ross County	38	14	6	18	55	61	−6	48	
7	Inverness Caledonian Thistle	38	14	10	14	54	48	+6	52	
8	Dundee	38	11	15	12	53	57	−4	48	

Source: Scottish Premiership, Soccerway (first phase), Soccerway (second phase)
Rules for classification: 1) Points; 2) Goal difference; 3) Goals scored; 4) Play-off (only if deciding champion, UEFA competitions qualification and second stage group allocation).

=== Results by round ===
Round	1	2	3	4	5	6	7	8	9	10	11	12	13	14	15	16	17	18	19	20	21	22	23	24	25	26	27	28	29	30	31	32	33	34	35	36	37	38
Ground	A	H	A	H	A	A	A	H	A	H	H	A	A	H	H	A	H	A	A	H	H	A	H	A	H	A	H	H	A	A	H	A	H	A	H	A	H	A
Result	L	W	D	L	W	W	D	W	D	L	W	L	L	L	W	L	L	W	L	W	W	L	L	W	L	L	W	L	W	D	L	L	W	D	L	D	L	W
Position	11	6	6	6	5	5	4	4	5	5	3	4	5	5	5	6	6	5	5	5	5	5	5	4	6	7	5	6	4	4	6	8	6	6	6	6	6	6

Updated to match(es) played on 15 May 2016. Source: worldfootball.net
A = Away; H = Home; W = Win; D = Draw; L = Loss

=== Management statistics ===
Name	From	To	P	W	D	L	Win% (Note: Win% is the percentage of matches won rounded to two decimal places.)
Jim McIntyre	1 August 2015	Present	47	21	7	19	44.68

== Transfers ==
=== In ===
Date	Player	From	Fee
25 May 2015	(Scotland) Ian McShane	(Scotland) Queen of the South	Undisclosed
27 May 2015	(Scotland) Michael Gardyne	(Scotland) Dundee United	Free
29 May 2015	(Scotland) Scott Fox	(Scotland) Partick Thistle	Free
10 June 2015	(Scotland) Brian Graham	(Scotland) Dundee United	Free
16 June 2015	(England) Darren Holden	(England) Hartlepool United	Free
18 June 2015	(England) Jonathan Franks	(England) Hartlepool United	Free
30 June 2015	(Scotland) Richard Foster	(Scotland) Rangers	Free
30 June 2015	(England) Andrew Davies	(England) Bradford City	Free
30 June 2015	(Scotland) Chris Robertson	(England) Port Vale	Free
1 July 2015	(Scotland) Stewart Murdoch	(England) Fleetwood Town	Free
28 July 2015	(Australia) Jackson Irvine	(Scotland) Celtic	Compensation
28 July 2015	(Austria) Daniel Bachmann	(England) Stoke City	Loan
31 August 2015	(Scotland) Martin Woods	(England) Shrewsbury Town	Free
2 September 2015	(England) Gary Woods	(England) Leyton Orient	Loan
6 October 2015	(Netherlands) Alex Schalk	(Netherlands) Go Ahead Eagles	Free
16 October 2015	(England) James Severn	(England) Worcester City	Free
26 January 2016	(Scotland) Paul Quinn	(Scotland) Aberdeen	Free
1 February 2016	(Scotland) David Goodwillie	(Scotland) Aberdeen	Loan
8 March 2016	(United States) Chris Konopka	(Canada) Toronto FC	Free

=== Out ===
Date	Player	To	Fee
20 May 2015	(Scotland) Richard Brittain	(Scotland) Brora Rangers	Free
20 May 2015	(England) Jake Jervis	(England) Plymouth Argyle	Free
20 May 2015	(Scotland) Mark Brown	(Scotland) Dumbarton	Free
20 May 2015	(England) Joe Cardle	(Scotland) Dunfermline Athletic	Free
20 May 2015	(Republic of Ireland) Graham Carey	(England) Plymouth Argyle	Free
20 May 2015	(Spain) Antonio Reguero	(Scotland) Hibernian	Free
20 May 2015	(Canada) Terry Dunfield	(Canada) Toronto Atomic	Free
20 May 2015	(England) Ben Frempah	(England) Hendon	Free
20 May 2015	(Ivory Coast) Abdoulaye Méïté	(Finland) SJK Seinäjoki	Free
20 May 2015	(Spain) Rubén Palazuelos	(Spain) CD Guijuelo	Free
20 May 2015	(Scotland) Steven Saunders	(Scotland) Dumbarton	Free
20 May 2015	(Lithuania) Darvydas Šernas	(Lithuania) Žalgiris Vilnius	Free
20 May 2015	(Scotland) Darren Barr	(Scotland) Dumbarton	Free
27 May 2015	(Scotland) Martin Woods	(England) Shrewsbury Town	Free
27 May 2015	(Scotland) Paul Quinn	(Scotland) Aberdeen	Free
15 January 2016	(Scotland) Rocco Quinn	(Scotland) St Mirren	Free

== See also ==
- List of Ross County F.C. seasons
