= Paul Heffernan =

Irish footballer

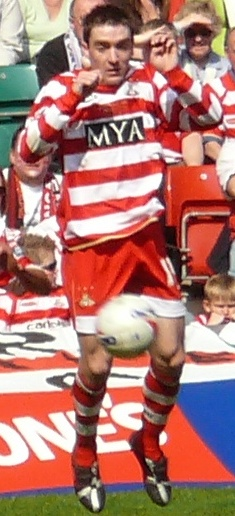
- Heffernan playing for Doncaster Rovers

Personal information
- Full name: Paul Heffernan
- Date of birth: 29 December 1981 (age 44)
- Place of birth: Newtownmountkennedy, County Wicklow, Ireland
- Height: 5 ft 10 in (1.78 m)
- Position: Striker

Team information
- Current team: Bray Wanderers (first team coach)

Youth career
- –1999: Newtown

Senior career*
| Years | Team | Apps | (Gls) |
| 1999–2004 | Notts County | 100 | (35) |
| 2004–2005 | Bristol City | 27 | (5) |
| 2005–2010 | Doncaster Rovers | 127 | (35) |
| 2009 | → Oldham Athletic (loan) | 4 | (1) |
| 2010 | → Bristol Rovers (loan) | 11 | (4) |
| 2010–2011 | Sheffield Wednesday | 17 | (3) |
| 2011–2013 | Kilmarnock | 56 | (20) |
| 2013–2015 | Hibernian | 30 | (5) |
| 2015 | Dundee | 7 | (1) |
| 2015–2016 | Queen of the South | 5 | (1) |
| 2016 | Dumbarton | 8 | (0) |
| Total | | 392 | (110) |

International career
| 2002 | Republic of Ireland U21 | 1 | (1) |
- * Club domestic league appearances and goals

Paul Heffernan (born 29 December 1981) is an Irish association football coach and former professional player who is the head coach of Bray Wanderers. A striker, Heffernan played for several clubs in Great Britain which include Sheffield Wednesday, Doncaster Rovers, Notts County, Bristol City, Kilmarnock, Hibernian, Dundee, Queen of the South, and Dumbarton.

== Career ==
Heffernan started his football career at Notts County and at age 18, he made his league debut, coming on as a substitute for Kevin Rapley in the 76th minute, in a 1–0 loss against Oldham Athletic on 24 April 2000. Heffernan won the "Young Player of the Year" in 2002–03 scoring 10 goals from 25 matches. Then, in the 2003–04 season, Heffernan scored two hat-tricks of his career: The first was in a game against Queens Park Rangers in a 3–3 draw on 26 December 2003 and the second was in a game against Stockport County, where he scored four times, in a 4–1 win on 21 February 2004. Shortly after this, Heffernan, whose contract expired at the end of the 2003–04 season, rejected a two-and-a-half-year deal on improved terms with the club. His rejection attracted interests from four clubs, after confirming the previous day that he was walking out the club following their relegation. Later on in his Notts County career, Heffernan would make 100 appearances scoring 35 goals.

=== Bristol City ===
In the summer of 2004 Bristol City paid £150,000 for him. Heffernan made his debut, in the opening game of the season, in a 1–1 draw against Torquay United on 7 August 2004 and then scored his first goal against Stockport County in his fifth appearance for the club. Four months into joining the club, his form went sour so that Notts County attempted to sign him on loan. But the next day, Heffernan scored in a FA Cup match against Brentford, but the team lost in a penalty-shootout after a 1–1 draw in regular time. However, during the season due to injury and the form of Steve Brooker and Leroy Lita, his chances in the first team were limited.

At the end of the 2004–05 season, Heffernan said he desired to leave Bristol City. Oldham Athletic had their bid to sign Hefferman accepted, which was followed up by Doncaster Rovers.

=== Doncaster Rovers ===
He joined Doncaster Rovers in the summer of 2005 for £125,000, which was then a new record transfer fee paid by the club. The Irishman weighed in with some key goals throughout his Doncaster Rovers career.

He made his debut, in the opening game of the season, in a 0–0 draw against his former club, and scored in the next game against MK Dons. Heffernan was involved in the squad in the League Cup that reached the quarter-finals, starting off beating Manchester City in a penalty shoot-out after a 1–1 draw after extra-time. He converted the last penalty. He also scored against Aston Villa in a 3–0 win, before Rovers were finally beaten in a penalty shoot-out against Arsenal. Later in the season, Heffernan was not included in the first team. He had scored seven times in 26 appearances.

In the 2006–07 season, under new manager Sean O'Driscoll, Heffernan made a return in the first team and was awarded League One Player of the Month for December after netting four times from five league games during the month. Heffernan played a vital role when he scored twice in each leg of the Football League Trophy semi-final against Crewe Alexandra, goals which ultimately sent Rovers to the final of that competition. Seven days later, Heffernan signed a new deal with the club, that would keep him there till 2010. Shortly after that, Heffernan damaged his ankle against Port Vale and was out for a month. He made his return just in time for the Football Trophy final and scored the second goal at the Millennium Stadium in Cardiff against Bristol Rovers, which Doncaster won 3–2. Soon afterwards, Heffernan once again damaged his ankle, against Millwall, which meant him missing the rest of the season, though he still made 43 appearances and scored 21 goals, making him the club's top-scorer for the season.

In the 2007–08 season, Heffernan started by making nine appearances and scoring once. His playing time was reduced before not being included in the starting 11 in late-October. By December, he sustained ligament damage to his ankle, which kept him out of action for five weeks. Later in the season, Heffernan sparked a moment of controversy in the 2008 League One Play-off semi-final playing against Southend United, when he headbutted an opponent due to frustration in the final minute of the match. Heffernan was subsequently sent-off and was unable to play in the second leg, or the final against Leeds United at Wembley Stadium. After a 3–2 win, he finished his season with 30 appearances and eight goals in all competitions. Heffernan reflected on his incident, quoting:

I was suspended for the final at Wembley because I got sent off in the semi-final first leg, so that wasn't great. It was a bad day for me and it also involved Celtic's Charlie Mulgrew, who was playing for Southend at the time, on loan from Wolves. I was provoked. It was at the end of the game and it wasn't really a headbutt. He was in my face and I just had a little nod of the head. The referee was looking straight at the incident and had no option but to show red. To be fair, he had to send me off, it was a rush of blood to the head. Obviously it was disappointing to miss the play-off final because you don't get many chances to play at Wembley, however good your career. We beat Leeds 1–0, in front of a full house, so it was a great day for the club. It was just disappointing I had to watch from the sidelines.

In the 2008–09 season, O'Driscoll allowed Heffernan to leave the club, citing the club was re-building the squad. Having been absent for the first three matches, his future was uncertain after dropping down the pecking order in Sean O'Driscoll's plans. Eventually, the move didn't happen and Heffernan fought his way to earn a first team place and went on to make 33 appearances and scored 10 goals, finishing as the club's top scorer in all competitions.

In the 2009–10 season, Hefferman mostly spent time on the bench, coming on as a substitute in a number of games after struggling to hold down a regular place. This led to him willing to go on loan to earn a first choice place. In November, he joined Oldham Athletic on an initial month-long loan deal. He went on make four appearances and scored once. In a match against Wycombe Wanderers, on 19 December 2009, Heffernman hit both the crossbar and the post. On 31 December 2009, his loan spell with Oldham came to an end.

Following his loan move to Bristol Rovers in February 2010, he scored four times in 10 appearances. On 9 March 2010, Heffernan had his loan spell with Bristol Rovers extended until the end of the season. However, on 5 April 2010, he was recalled by Doncaster because of injury problems.

In May 2010, Doncaster announced that he was one of six players who would not be offered new contracts. After his release, Heffernan was linked with Bristol Rovers and Carlisle United.

=== Sheffield Wednesday ===
On 9 June 2010, he joined Sheffield Wednesday on a free transfer, and given the number 9 shirt shortly after. However, Heffernan struggled to earn a first team place at the club, having spent time on bench behind Gary Madine, Clinton Morrison and Neil Mellor. By the end of the 2010–11 season, Heffernan had made 21 appearances and scored three times in all competitions.

He left Sheffield Wednesday by mutual consent on 15 June 2011.

=== Kilmarnock ===
Shortly after leaving Sheffield Wednesday, he signed for Kilmarnock. Heffernan scored his first two goals for Kilmarnock in a 4–1 win over Hibernian at Rugby Park on 14 August 2011. His good form continued as he went on to score a hat-trick in the Scottish League Cup third round match against Queen of the South in a 5–0 win. Heffernan says scoring a hat-trick overcame his mistakes in the previous match.

On 18 March, Heffernan played in the 2012 Scottish League Cup Final which Kilmarnock won after beating Celtic 1–0. In his first season, Heffernan made 36 appearances and scored 15 times in all competitions, joint top-scorer with Dean Shiels. Manager Danny Lennon compared Heffernan to Wayne Rooney, claiming it is similar up here with him. Heffernan had thanked Kenny Shiels for putting his career back on track, by increasing his goals tally.

In the 2012–13 season, Heffernan missed out the first nine matches due to a collarbone injury. After two months out, Heffernan played his first game of the season in a 2–1 loss against St Johnstone. Following his five-goal to his tally this season, he scored his first hat-trick in over a year, as Kilmarnock beat Hearts 3–0 on 16 February 2013. Manager Shiels believed Heffernan should have won the February Player of the Month award, having scored six goals that month. Heffernan wasn't able to score goals later in the season, following the arrival of Kris Boyd, but was willing to form a partnership.

Heffernan and the club's chairman Michael Johnson later fell out over an interview and this led to him leaving Kilmarnock.

=== Hibernian ===
On 30 August 2013, it was announced that Heffernan had agreed a deal with Kilmarnock's Scottish Premiership rivals Hibernian until the end of the 2014–15 season.

On 14 September, Heffernan was given his first start and scored the first Hibs goal in a 2–1 away win against St Johnstone. He scored again in the next game on 21 September 2013, in a 2–0 win over St Mirren. Heffernan then scored his third goal of the season, in a 1–1 draw against Celtic a month later. However, Heffernan later had his playing time limited, having spent time as an unused substitute.

Heffernan sustained a thigh injury in a goalless draw against St Mirren, where he played six minutes under new manager Terry Butcher and would be out for three-four weeks. He made his return on 3 January 2014, in the Edinburgh derby, where he came on as a substitution as Hibernian won 2–1.

While warming up ahead of a match against Aberdeen, Heffernan sustained a groin injury, which ruled him out for the remainder of the season. Unexpectedly, Heffernan made his return in the last game of the season against his former club, Kilmarnock, which they lost and condemned the club to the play-offs. In the play-offs against second place Hamilton Academical, Heffernan set up a goal for Jason Cummings, who scored twice in the match, as Hibernian won 2–0 in the first leg, which meant Hibernian might retain their Scottish Premiership status. However, Hamilton caught up the same scoreline in the second leg and the draw resulted in extra time until it went to penalty shoot-out. However, Hibernian lost and were relegated to the Scottish Championship.

In the first half of the season, Heffernan continued to be used in the first team squad, though playing less in the first team and being an unused substitute. Heffernan then scored his first goal of the season, in a 4–0 win over Livingston on 18 October 2014. Having not played since Raith Rovers on 20 December 2014, it was announced that Heffernan would be leaving the club, even before his contract came to an end in the summer.

=== Dundee ===
On 2 February 2015, Heffernan signed for Dundee. Heffernan debuted for the Dens Park club on 14 February 2015, in a 1–0 win against Partick Thistle. On 8 April 2015, he scored his first goal for the club, in a 3–1 win in the Dundee derby against city rivals Dundee United.

Heffernan was released by Dundee at the end of the season having made 7 league appearances and scoring one goal.

=== Queen of the South ===
On 13 August 2015, Heffernan signed for Queen of the South on a short-term contract until January 2016.

On 11 January 2016, Heffernan was released from Queens at the end of his short-term contract, having made seven appearances and scoring one goal.

=== Dumbarton ===
After leaving the Dumfries club on 11 January 2016, Heffernan then signed for fellow Scottish Championship side Dumbarton on 10 March 2016, on a deal until the end of the season. He left at the end of his short-term contract.

== Career statistics ==
Appearances and goals by club, season and competition
| Club | Season | League | | National cup | | League cup | | Other (Note: Includes Football League Trophy, SPFL play-offs and Scottish Challenge Cup.) | | Total | |
| Club | Season | Apps | Goals | Apps | Goals | Apps | Goals | Apps | Goals | Apps | Goals |
|---|---|---|---|---|---|---|---|---|---|---|---|
| Notts County | 1999–00 | 2 | 0 | 0 | 0 | 0 | 0 | 0 | 0 | 2 | 0 |
| Notts County | 2000–01 | 1 | 0 | 0 | 0 | 0 | 0 | 1 | 0 | 2 | 0 |
| Notts County | 2001–02 | 23 | 5 | 1 | 0 | 1 | 0 | 2 | 0 | 27 | 5 |
| Notts County | 2002–03 | 36 | 10 | 1 | 0 | 1 | 1 | 1 | 0 | 39 | 11 |
| Notts County | 2003–04 | 38 | 20 | 2 | 1 | 3 | 0 | 1 | 0 | 44 | 21 |
| Notts County | Total | 100 | 35 | 4 | 1 | 5 | 1 | 5 | 0 | 114 | 37 |
| Bristol City | 2004–05 | 27 | 5 | 1 | 1 | 1 | 0 | 2 | 1 | 31 | 7 |
| Doncaster Rovers | 2005–06 | 26 | 7 | 3 | 3 | 4 | 3 | 1 | 0 | 34 | 13 |
| Doncaster Rovers | 2006–07 | 29 | 11 | 4 | 1 | 3 | 0 | 7 | 9 | 43 | 21 |
| Doncaster Rovers | 2007–08 | 27 | 7 | 0 | 0 | 2 | 1 | 3 | 1 | 32 | 9 |
| Doncaster Rovers | 2008–09 | 28 | 10 | 4 | 0 | 1 | 0 | 0 | 0 | 33 | 10 |
| Doncaster Rovers | 2009–10 | 17 | 0 | 1 | 0 | 0 | 0 | 0 | 0 | 18 | 0 |
| Doncaster Rovers | Total | 154 | 40 | 13 | 5 | 11 | 4 | 13 | 11 | 191 | 60 |
| Oldham (loan) | 2009–10 | 4 | 1 | 0 | 0 | 0 | 0 | 0 | 0 | 4 | 1 |
| Bristol Rovers (loan) | 2009–10 | 11 | 4 | 0 | 0 | 0 | 0 | 0 | 0 | 11 | 4 |
| Sheffield Wednesday | 2010–11 | 17 | 3 | 2 | 0 | 2 | 0 | 2 | 0 | 23 | 3 |
| Kilmarnock | 2011–12 | 29 | 11 | 3 | 1 | 4 | 3 | 0 | 0 | 36 | 15 |
| Kilmarnock | 2012–13 | 27 | 9 | 3 | 3 | 0 | 0 | 0 | 0 | 30 | 12 |
| Kilmarnock | 2013–14 | 4 | 0 | 0 | 0 | 1 | 0 | 0 | 0 | 5 | 0 |
| Kilmarnock | Total | 92 | 28 | 8 | 4 | 7 | 3 | 2 | 0 | 109 | 35 |
| Hibernian | 2013–14 | 19 | 4 | 1 | 0 | 0 | 0 | 2 | 0 | 22 | 4 |
| Hibernian | 2014–15 | 11 | 1 | 0 | 0 | 1 | 0 | 1 | 0 | 13 | 1 |
| Hibernian | Total | 30 | 5 | 1 | 0 | 1 | 0 | 3 | 0 | 35 | 5 |
| Dundee | 2014–15 | 7 | 1 | 0 | 0 | 0 | 0 | 0 | 0 | 7 | 1 |
| Queen of the South | 2015–16 | 5 | 1 | 0 | 0 | 1 | 0 | 1 | 0 | 7 | 1 |
| Dumbarton | 2015–16 | 8 | 0 | 0 | 0 | 0 | 0 | 0 | 0 | 8 | 0 |
| Career total | | 395 | 110 | 26 | 10 | 25 | 8 | 24 | 11 | 466 | 139 |

== Honours ==
=== Player ===
Doncaster Rovers

- Football League Trophy: 2006–07

Kilmarnock

- Scottish League Cup: 2011–2012

Individual

- Football League One Player of the Month: December 2006

=== Manager ===
Bray Wanderers

- Leinster Senior Cup: 2025-26
