= English football sponsorship =

Sponsorship deals in English football

== Sponsorship deals ==
The first tournament for English Football League clubs to sell its naming rights was the Watney Cup, sponsored by brewer Watney Mann which was played from 1970 to 1973.

The 1970–71 season saw the Ford Sporting League, sponsored by Ford, take place for the first and only time, and also the start of the Texaco Cup (sponsored by Texaco) which was played until 1975.

The first major English competition to negotiate a sponsorship deal was the League Cup, negotiating a £2 million deal in 1982 with the National Dairy Council. It became known as the "Milk Cup" and has since adopted the name of its sponsors in this same way.

The following season in 1983 the Football League negotiated a sponsorship deal with Canon worth £3.3 million over 3 years. Cardiff City became the first second division club to sign a sponsorship deal and carried the “SuperTed” flash, which became an iconic collector's item, and replica shirts are still sold to this day. Since the formation of the breakaway Premier League in 1992, the competition has struck up its own sponsorship deals separately from the Football League (though it was unsponsored in its first season after a $17.1 million agreement with Bass Brewery was vetoed by Arsenal, Liverpool and Nottingham Forest).

The last major English competition to negotiate a sponsorship deal was in fact its oldest, the FA Cup. The competition was sponsored by Littlewoods for four seasons, starting in 1994 in a deal with £14 million. In 1998, Axa Insurance started their sponsorship of the competition for four seasons. It was always carefully named, being the "AXA-sponsored FA Cup", or the "FA Cup sponsored by AXA", and never the "AXA Cup". From 2002–03 through 2005–06, the FA Cup did not have a dedicated sponsor, but instead shared the team of sponsors of The Football Association. From 2006 to 2011, the FA Cup was known as "The FA Cup sponsored by E.ON" due to a deal with energy company E.ON. From the 2011–12 season to the 2013–14 season, the FA Cup was sponsored by Budweiser Beer and known as the FA Cup with Budweiser. Emirates has been the sponsor since 2015, initially renaming the competition as 'The Emirates FA Cup', unlike previous editions. The Emirates sponsorship deal, originally scheduled to terminate in 2018, was later extended three times until 2021, 2024, 2028.

In July 2026, the Gambling Commission announced plans to crack down on unlicensed casinos promoting themselves via sports sponsorships, including deals with professional football clubs.

== Summary of competition sponsorship deals ==
Season	Premier League	English Football League	National League	FA Cup	FA Community Shield	EFL Cup	EFL Trophy
1982–83	Did not exist	No sponsor	No sponsor	No sponsor	No sponsor	Milk Marketing Board (Milk Cup)	No sponsor
1983–84	Did not exist	Canon (Canon League)	No sponsor	No sponsor	No sponsor	Milk Marketing Board (Milk Cup)	No sponsor
1984–85	Did not exist	Canon (Canon League)	Gola (Gola League)	No sponsor	General Motors (1984: FA Charity Shield sponsored by General Motors; 1985–1987: General Motors FA Charity Shield)	Milk Marketing Board (Milk Cup)	Freight Rover (Freight Rover Trophy)
1985–86	Did not exist	Canon (Canon League)	Gola (Gola League)	No sponsor	General Motors (1984: FA Charity Shield sponsored by General Motors; 1985–1987: General Motors FA Charity Shield)	Milk Marketing Board (Milk Cup)	Freight Rover (Freight Rover Trophy)
1986–87	Did not exist	Today (Today League)	General Motors (GM Vauxhall Conference)	No sponsor	General Motors (1984: FA Charity Shield sponsored by General Motors; 1985–1987: General Motors FA Charity Shield)	Littlewoods (Littlewoods Challenge Cup)	Freight Rover (Freight Rover Trophy)
1987–88	Did not exist	Barclays (Barclays League)	General Motors (GM Vauxhall Conference)	No sponsor	General Motors (1984: FA Charity Shield sponsored by General Motors; 1985–1987: General Motors FA Charity Shield)	Littlewoods (Littlewoods Challenge Cup)	Sherpa Van (Sherpa Van Trophy)
1988–89	Did not exist	Barclays (Barclays League)	General Motors (GM Vauxhall Conference)	No sponsor	No sponsor	Littlewoods (Littlewoods Challenge Cup)	Sherpa Van (Sherpa Van Trophy)
1989–90	Did not exist	Barclays (Barclays League)	General Motors (GM Vauxhall Conference)	No sponsor	Wellpark Brewery (Tennent's FA Charity Shield)	Littlewoods (Littlewoods Challenge Cup)	Leyland DAF (Leyland DAF Cup)
1990–91	Did not exist	Barclays (Barclays League)	General Motors (GM Vauxhall Conference)	No sponsor	Wellpark Brewery (Tennent's FA Charity Shield)	Rumbelows (Rumbelows Cup)	Leyland DAF (Leyland DAF Cup)
1991–92	Did not exist	Barclays (Barclays League)	General Motors (GM Vauxhall Conference)	No sponsor	Wellpark Brewery (Tennent's FA Charity Shield)	Rumbelows (Rumbelows Cup)	Autoglass (Autoglass Trophy)
1992–93	No sponsor	Barclays (Barclays League)	General Motors (GM Vauxhall Conference)	No sponsor	Wellpark Brewery (Tennent's FA Charity Shield)	Coca-Cola (Coca-Cola Cup)	Autoglass (Autoglass Trophy)
1993–94	Carling Brewery (FA Carling Premiership)	Endsleigh (Endsleigh League)	General Motors (GM Vauxhall Conference)	No sponsor	No sponsor	Coca-Cola (Coca-Cola Cup)	Autoglass (Autoglass Trophy)
1994–95	Carling Brewery (FA Carling Premiership)	Endsleigh (Endsleigh League)	General Motors (GM Vauxhall Conference)	Littlewoods (FA Cup sponsored by Littlewoods)	No sponsor	Coca-Cola (Coca-Cola Cup)	Auto Windscreens (Auto Windscreens Shield)
1995–96	Carling Brewery (FA Carling Premiership)	Endsleigh (Endsleigh League)	General Motors (GM Vauxhall Conference)	Littlewoods (FA Cup sponsored by Littlewoods)	Littlewoods (1995: Littlewoods Pools FA Charity Shield, 1996–1997: Littlewoods FA Charity Shield)	Coca-Cola (Coca-Cola Cup)	Auto Windscreens (Auto Windscreens Shield)
1996–97	Carling Brewery (FA Carling Premiership)	Nationwide (Nationwide Football League)	General Motors (GM Vauxhall Conference)	Littlewoods (FA Cup sponsored by Littlewoods)	Littlewoods (1995: Littlewoods Pools FA Charity Shield, 1996–1997: Littlewoods FA Charity Shield)	Coca-Cola (Coca-Cola Cup)	Auto Windscreens (Auto Windscreens Shield)
1997–98	Carling Brewery (FA Carling Premiership)	Nationwide (Nationwide Football League)	General Motors (GM Vauxhall Conference)	Littlewoods (FA Cup sponsored by Littlewoods)	Littlewoods (1995: Littlewoods Pools FA Charity Shield, 1996–1997: Littlewoods FA Charity Shield)	Coca-Cola (Coca-Cola Cup)	Auto Windscreens (Auto Windscreens Shield)
1998–99	Carling Brewery (FA Carling Premiership)	Nationwide (Nationwide Football League)	Nationwide (Nationwide Conference)	Axa (1998–1999: The AXA sponsored FA Cup, 1999–2002: The FA Cup sponsored by AXA)	Axa (AXA FA Charity Shield)	Worthington Brewery (Worthington Cup)	Auto Windscreens (Auto Windscreens Shield)
1999–2000	Carling Brewery (FA Carling Premiership)	Nationwide (Nationwide Football League)	Nationwide (Nationwide Conference)	Axa (1998–1999: The AXA sponsored FA Cup, 1999–2002: The FA Cup sponsored by AXA)	One2One (One2One FA Charity Shield)	Worthington Brewery (Worthington Cup)	Auto Windscreens (Auto Windscreens Shield)
2000–01	Carling Brewery (FA Carling Premiership)	Nationwide (Nationwide Football League)	Nationwide (Nationwide Conference)	Axa (1998–1999: The AXA sponsored FA Cup, 1999–2002: The FA Cup sponsored by AXA)	One2One (One2One FA Charity Shield)	Worthington Brewery (Worthington Cup)	LDV Vans (LDV Vans Trophy)
2001–02	Barclaycard (FA Barclaycard Premiership)	Nationwide (Nationwide Football League)	Nationwide (Nationwide Conference)	Axa (1998–1999: The AXA sponsored FA Cup, 1999–2002: The FA Cup sponsored by AXA)	One2One (One2One FA Charity Shield)	Worthington Brewery (Worthington Cup)	LDV Vans (LDV Vans Trophy)
2002–03	Barclaycard (FA Barclaycard Premiership)	Nationwide (Nationwide Football League)	Nationwide (Nationwide Conference)	No sponsor	McDonald's (2002–2006: The FA Community Shield in partnership with McDonald's, 2007–2013: The FA Community Shield sponsored by McDonald's, 2014–2021: The FA Community Shield supported by McDonald's)	Worthington Brewery (Worthington Cup)	LDV Vans (LDV Vans Trophy)
2003–04	Barclaycard (FA Barclaycard Premiership)	Nationwide (Nationwide Football League)	Nationwide (Nationwide Conference)	No sponsor	McDonald's (2002–2006: The FA Community Shield in partnership with McDonald's, 2007–2013: The FA Community Shield sponsored by McDonald's, 2014–2021: The FA Community Shield supported by McDonald's)	Carling Brewery (Carling Cup)	LDV Vans (LDV Vans Trophy)
2004–05	Barclays (2004–2007: FA Barclays Premiership, 2007–2016: Barclays Premier League)	Coca-Cola (Coca-Cola Football League)	Nationwide (Nationwide Conference)	No sponsor	McDonald's (2002–2006: The FA Community Shield in partnership with McDonald's, 2007–2013: The FA Community Shield sponsored by McDonald's, 2014–2021: The FA Community Shield supported by McDonald's)	Carling Brewery (Carling Cup)	LDV Vans (LDV Vans Trophy)
2005–06	Barclays (2004–2007: FA Barclays Premiership, 2007–2016: Barclays Premier League)	Coca-Cola (Coca-Cola Football League)	Nationwide (Nationwide Conference)	No sponsor	McDonald's (2002–2006: The FA Community Shield in partnership with McDonald's, 2007–2013: The FA Community Shield sponsored by McDonald's, 2014–2021: The FA Community Shield supported by McDonald's)	Carling Brewery (Carling Cup)	No sponsor
2006–07	Barclays (2004–2007: FA Barclays Premiership, 2007–2016: Barclays Premier League)	Coca-Cola (Coca-Cola Football League)	Nationwide (Nationwide Conference)	E.ON (The FA Cup sponsored by E.ON)	McDonald's (2002–2006: The FA Community Shield in partnership with McDonald's, 2007–2013: The FA Community Shield sponsored by McDonald's, 2014–2021: The FA Community Shield supported by McDonald's)	Carling Brewery (Carling Cup)	Johnstone's Paint (Johnstone's Paint Trophy)
2007–08	Barclays (2004–2007: FA Barclays Premiership, 2007–2016: Barclays Premier League)	Coca-Cola (Coca-Cola Football League)	Blue Square (2007–10: Blue Square Premier; Blue Square North; Blue Square South, 2010–13: Blue Square Bet Premier; Blue Square Bet North; Blue Square Bet South)	E.ON (The FA Cup sponsored by E.ON)	McDonald's (2002–2006: The FA Community Shield in partnership with McDonald's, 2007–2013: The FA Community Shield sponsored by McDonald's, 2014–2021: The FA Community Shield supported by McDonald's)	Carling Brewery (Carling Cup)	Johnstone's Paint (Johnstone's Paint Trophy)
2008–09	Barclays (2004–2007: FA Barclays Premiership, 2007–2016: Barclays Premier League)	Coca-Cola (Coca-Cola Football League)	Blue Square (2007–10: Blue Square Premier; Blue Square North; Blue Square South, 2010–13: Blue Square Bet Premier; Blue Square Bet North; Blue Square Bet South)	E.ON (The FA Cup sponsored by E.ON)	McDonald's (2002–2006: The FA Community Shield in partnership with McDonald's, 2007–2013: The FA Community Shield sponsored by McDonald's, 2014–2021: The FA Community Shield supported by McDonald's)	Carling Brewery (Carling Cup)	Johnstone's Paint (Johnstone's Paint Trophy)
2009–10	Barclays (2004–2007: FA Barclays Premiership, 2007–2016: Barclays Premier League)	Coca-Cola (Coca-Cola Football League)	Blue Square (2007–10: Blue Square Premier; Blue Square North; Blue Square South, 2010–13: Blue Square Bet Premier; Blue Square Bet North; Blue Square Bet South)	E.ON (The FA Cup sponsored by E.ON)	McDonald's (2002–2006: The FA Community Shield in partnership with McDonald's, 2007–2013: The FA Community Shield sponsored by McDonald's, 2014–2021: The FA Community Shield supported by McDonald's)	Carling Brewery (Carling Cup)	Johnstone's Paint (Johnstone's Paint Trophy)
2010–11	Barclays (2004–2007: FA Barclays Premiership, 2007–2016: Barclays Premier League)	npower (npower Football League)	Blue Square (2007–10: Blue Square Premier; Blue Square North; Blue Square South, 2010–13: Blue Square Bet Premier; Blue Square Bet North; Blue Square Bet South)	E.ON (The FA Cup sponsored by E.ON)	McDonald's (2002–2006: The FA Community Shield in partnership with McDonald's, 2007–2013: The FA Community Shield sponsored by McDonald's, 2014–2021: The FA Community Shield supported by McDonald's)	Carling Brewery (Carling Cup)	Johnstone's Paint (Johnstone's Paint Trophy)
2011–12	Barclays (2004–2007: FA Barclays Premiership, 2007–2016: Barclays Premier League)	npower (npower Football League)	Blue Square (2007–10: Blue Square Premier; Blue Square North; Blue Square South, 2010–13: Blue Square Bet Premier; Blue Square Bet North; Blue Square Bet South)	Budweiser (The FA Cup with Budweiser)	McDonald's (2002–2006: The FA Community Shield in partnership with McDonald's, 2007–2013: The FA Community Shield sponsored by McDonald's, 2014–2021: The FA Community Shield supported by McDonald's)	Carling Brewery (Carling Cup)	Johnstone's Paint (Johnstone's Paint Trophy)
2012–13	Barclays (2004–2007: FA Barclays Premiership, 2007–2016: Barclays Premier League)	npower (npower Football League)	Blue Square (2007–10: Blue Square Premier; Blue Square North; Blue Square South, 2010–13: Blue Square Bet Premier; Blue Square Bet North; Blue Square Bet South)	Budweiser (The FA Cup with Budweiser)	McDonald's (2002–2006: The FA Community Shield in partnership with McDonald's, 2007–2013: The FA Community Shield sponsored by McDonald's, 2014–2021: The FA Community Shield supported by McDonald's)	Capital One (Capital One Cup)	Johnstone's Paint (Johnstone's Paint Trophy)
2013–14	Barclays (2004–2007: FA Barclays Premiership, 2007–2016: Barclays Premier League)	Sky Bet (2013–2016: Sky Bet Football League, 2016–2029: Sky Bet EFL)	Skrill (The Skrill Premier; The Skrill North; The Skrill South)	Budweiser (The FA Cup with Budweiser)	McDonald's (2002–2006: The FA Community Shield in partnership with McDonald's, 2007–2013: The FA Community Shield sponsored by McDonald's, 2014–2021: The FA Community Shield supported by McDonald's)	Capital One (Capital One Cup)	Johnstone's Paint (Johnstone's Paint Trophy)
2014–15	Barclays (2004–2007: FA Barclays Premiership, 2007–2016: Barclays Premier League)	Sky Bet (2013–2016: Sky Bet Football League, 2016–2029: Sky Bet EFL)	Autorama Group (2014–2015: Vanarama Conference, 2015–2025: Vanarama National League)	No sponsor	McDonald's (2002–2006: The FA Community Shield in partnership with McDonald's, 2007–2013: The FA Community Shield sponsored by McDonald's, 2014–2021: The FA Community Shield supported by McDonald's)	Capital One (Capital One Cup)	Johnstone's Paint (Johnstone's Paint Trophy)
2015–16	Barclays (2004–2007: FA Barclays Premiership, 2007–2016: Barclays Premier League)	Sky Bet (2013–2016: Sky Bet Football League, 2016–2029: Sky Bet EFL)	Autorama Group (2014–2015: Vanarama Conference, 2015–2025: Vanarama National League)	Emirates (Emirates FA Cup); Heads Up (2020 Heads Up FA Cup Final)	McDonald's (2002–2006: The FA Community Shield in partnership with McDonald's, 2007–2013: The FA Community Shield sponsored by McDonald's, 2014–2021: The FA Community Shield supported by McDonald's)	Capital One (Capital One Cup)	Johnstone's Paint (Johnstone's Paint Trophy)
2016–17	No sponsor	Sky Bet (2013–2016: Sky Bet Football League, 2016–2029: Sky Bet EFL)	Autorama Group (2014–2015: Vanarama Conference, 2015–2025: Vanarama National League)	Emirates (Emirates FA Cup); Heads Up (2020 Heads Up FA Cup Final)	McDonald's (2002–2006: The FA Community Shield in partnership with McDonald's, 2007–2013: The FA Community Shield sponsored by McDonald's, 2014–2021: The FA Community Shield supported by McDonald's)	No sponsor	Checkatrade (Checkatrade Trophy)
2017–18	No sponsor	Sky Bet (2013–2016: Sky Bet Football League, 2016–2029: Sky Bet EFL)	Autorama Group (2014–2015: Vanarama Conference, 2015–2025: Vanarama National League)	Emirates (Emirates FA Cup); Heads Up (2020 Heads Up FA Cup Final)	McDonald's (2002–2006: The FA Community Shield in partnership with McDonald's, 2007–2013: The FA Community Shield sponsored by McDonald's, 2014–2021: The FA Community Shield supported by McDonald's)	Carabao Energy Drink (Carabao Cup)	Checkatrade (Checkatrade Trophy)
2018–19	No sponsor	Sky Bet (2013–2016: Sky Bet Football League, 2016–2029: Sky Bet EFL)	Autorama Group (2014–2015: Vanarama Conference, 2015–2025: Vanarama National League)	Emirates (Emirates FA Cup); Heads Up (2020 Heads Up FA Cup Final)	McDonald's (2002–2006: The FA Community Shield in partnership with McDonald's, 2007–2013: The FA Community Shield sponsored by McDonald's, 2014–2021: The FA Community Shield supported by McDonald's)	Carabao Energy Drink (Carabao Cup)	Checkatrade (Checkatrade Trophy)
2019–20	No sponsor	Sky Bet (2013–2016: Sky Bet Football League, 2016–2029: Sky Bet EFL)	Autorama Group (2014–2015: Vanarama Conference, 2015–2025: Vanarama National League)	Emirates (Emirates FA Cup); Heads Up (2020 Heads Up FA Cup Final)	McDonald's (2002–2006: The FA Community Shield in partnership with McDonald's, 2007–2013: The FA Community Shield sponsored by McDonald's, 2014–2021: The FA Community Shield supported by McDonald's)	Carabao Energy Drink (Carabao Cup)	Leasing.com (Leasing.com Trophy)
2020–21	No sponsor	Sky Bet (2013–2016: Sky Bet Football League, 2016–2029: Sky Bet EFL)	Autorama Group (2014–2015: Vanarama Conference, 2015–2025: Vanarama National League)	Emirates (Emirates FA Cup); Heads Up (2020 Heads Up FA Cup Final)	McDonald's (2002–2006: The FA Community Shield in partnership with McDonald's, 2007–2013: The FA Community Shield sponsored by McDonald's, 2014–2021: The FA Community Shield supported by McDonald's)	Carabao Energy Drink (Carabao Cup)	Papa John's Pizza (Papa John's Trophy)
2021–22	No sponsor	Sky Bet (2013–2016: Sky Bet Football League, 2016–2029: Sky Bet EFL)	Autorama Group (2014–2015: Vanarama Conference, 2015–2025: Vanarama National League)	Emirates (Emirates FA Cup); Heads Up (2020 Heads Up FA Cup Final)	McDonald's (2002–2006: The FA Community Shield in partnership with McDonald's, 2007–2013: The FA Community Shield sponsored by McDonald's, 2014–2021: The FA Community Shield supported by McDonald's)	Carabao Energy Drink (Carabao Cup)	Papa John's Pizza (Papa John's Trophy)
2022–23	No sponsor	Sky Bet (2013–2016: Sky Bet Football League, 2016–2029: Sky Bet EFL)	Autorama Group (2014–2015: Vanarama Conference, 2015–2025: Vanarama National League)	Emirates (Emirates FA Cup); Heads Up (2020 Heads Up FA Cup Final)	No sponsor	Carabao Energy Drink (Carabao Cup)	Papa John's Pizza (Papa John's Trophy)
2023–24	No sponsor	Sky Bet (2013–2016: Sky Bet Football League, 2016–2029: Sky Bet EFL)	Autorama Group (2014–2015: Vanarama Conference, 2015–2025: Vanarama National League)	Emirates (Emirates FA Cup); Heads Up (2020 Heads Up FA Cup Final)	No sponsor	Carabao Energy Drink (Carabao Cup)	Vertu Motors (2023–2024: Bristol Street Motors Trophy, 2024–2026: Vertu Trophy)
2024–25	No sponsor	Sky Bet (2013–2016: Sky Bet Football League, 2016–2029: Sky Bet EFL)	Autorama Group (2014–2015: Vanarama Conference, 2015–2025: Vanarama National League)	Emirates (Emirates FA Cup); Heads Up (2020 Heads Up FA Cup Final)	No sponsor	Carabao Energy Drink (Carabao Cup)	Vertu Motors (2023–2024: Bristol Street Motors Trophy, 2024–2026: Vertu Trophy)
2025–26	No sponsor	Sky Bet (2013–2016: Sky Bet Football League, 2016–2029: Sky Bet EFL)	Enterprise Rent-A-Car (Enterprise National League)	Emirates (Emirates FA Cup); Heads Up (2020 Heads Up FA Cup Final)	No sponsor	Carabao Energy Drink (Carabao Cup)	Vertu Motors (2023–2024: Bristol Street Motors Trophy, 2024–2026: Vertu Trophy)
2026–27	No sponsor	Sky Bet (2013–2016: Sky Bet Football League, 2016–2029: Sky Bet EFL)	Enterprise Rent-A-Car (Enterprise National League)	Emirates (Emirates FA Cup); Heads Up (2020 Heads Up FA Cup Final)	No sponsor	Carabao Energy Drink (Carabao Cup)	No sponsor
2027–28	No sponsor	Sky Bet (2013–2016: Sky Bet Football League, 2016–2029: Sky Bet EFL)	Enterprise Rent-A-Car (Enterprise National League)	Emirates (Emirates FA Cup); Heads Up (2020 Heads Up FA Cup Final)	No sponsor	Carabao Energy Drink (Carabao Cup)	No sponsor
2028–29	No sponsor	Sky Bet (2013–2016: Sky Bet Football League, 2016–2029: Sky Bet EFL)	Enterprise Rent-A-Car (Enterprise National League)	No sponsor	No sponsor	Carabao Energy Drink (Carabao Cup)	No sponsor

== Summary of Premier League front-of-shirt sponsorship deals ==
Shirt sponsorship in English football clubs was pioneered by Coventry City in 1978 after they were sponsored by Talbot. The first English club to secure a sponsorship deal was Derby County, they only wore the football tops featuring the Saab sponsor once for a photo shoot. Issues arose with teams wearing sponsored shirts in the early 1980s. The scheduled broadcast of a match between Aston Villa and Brighton & Hove Albion on 22 October 1980 was cancelled as both teams refused to play without sponsors on their shirts. Newcastle United and Bolton Wanderers were fined £1,000 for wearing shirts with advertising in FA Cup games in January 1981. Nottingham Forest were fined £7,000 by UEFA for a similar offence in February 1981. By 1987, every league club had a shirt sponsorship deal. From the 2026–27 season onwards, gambling companies were banned as front-of-shirt sponsor but is still allowed as sleeve sponsor.

2026–27 Club	Sponsor	Start date	End date	Value
Arsenal	Emirates	2006	2033	£65m per year
Aston Villa	Visit Rwanda	2026	?	£20m per year
Bournemouth	Vitality	2026	?	£?m per year
Brentford	Indeed	2026	?	£?m per year
Brighton & Hove Albion	American Express	2019	2031	£100m
Chelsea	USDC	2026	2027	£?m
Coventry City	Monzo	2026	2027	£?m
Crystal Palace	Temporal	2026	2025	£30m
Everton	CMC Markets	2026	2026	£30m
Fulham	SBOTOP	2023	?	£10m
Hull City	Corendon Airlines	2022	2027	£?m
Ipswich Town	Halo Service Solutions	2025	2028	£?m
Leeds United	Red Bull	2024	?	£?m
Liverpool	Standard Chartered	2010	2027	£50m per year
Manchester City	Etihad Airways	2009	?	£67.5m per year
Manchester United	Snapdragon	2024	2027	£60m per year
Newcastle United	KNOX Hydrate	2026	2029	£80m
Nottingham Forest	Marex	2026	2029	£25m
Sunderland	Vacant			
Tottenham Hotspur	AIA	2013	2027	£40m per year

== Summary of kit manufacturer deals ==
Club	Start Date	End date	Per year	Manufacturer
Arsenal	2019	2030	£75m	Adidas
Aston Villa	2024	?	£17m	Adidas
Bournemouth	2017	2026	£2m	Umbro
Brentford	2025	?	£4m	Joma
Brighton & Hove Albion	2019	2030	£5m	Nike
Burnley	2024	?	£1m	Castore
Chelsea	2016	2032	£60m	Nike
Crystal Palace	2022	?	£4m	Macron
Everton	2024	?	£24m	Castore
Fulham	2017	2024	£5m	Adidas
Leeds United	2020	2026	£5m	Adidas
Liverpool	2025	2035	£60m	Adidas
Manchester City	2019	2028	£100m	Puma
Manchester United	2015	2035	£90m	Adidas
Newcastle United	2024	?	£40m	Adidas
Nottingham Forest	2023	?	£6m	Adidas
Sunderland	2024	2029	£0.5m	Hummel
Tottenham Hotspur	2018	2033	£50m	Nike
West Ham United	2019	2025	£7m	Umbro
Wolverhampton Wanderers	2024	?	£4m	Sudu
