= International 14 World Championships =

This is a list of International 14 World Championships is an international sailing regatta for the International 14 (dinghy) class, organized by the host club on behalf of the International 14 Class Association and recognized by World Sailing, the sports IOC recognized governing body.

== Fleet Racing World Championship ==
Games	Gold	Silver	Bronze!Ref.
1933; Oyster Bay			
1934; Toronto; Canada			
1936; The Clyde; Scotland			
1938; Toronto; Canada			
1948 Canada			
1958; Cowes; United Kingdom			
1961; Toronto; Canada			
1963; Hamilton; Bermuda			
1965; United States			
1967 Hayling Island; United Kingdom			
1969 Canada			
1971 Annapolis, USA			
1973 Seattle, USA			
1975 Hayling Island; United Kingdom			
1977; Canada			
1979 Long Beach, California	John Gallagher (USA); Dave Gallagher (USA)		
1981 Annapolis, Maryland USA	Frank McLaughlin (CAN); John Milen (CAN)		
1983; Pevensey Bay UK	James Kidd (CAN); Hugh Kidd (CAN)		
1985 Kingston, Ontario, Canada	James Kidd (CAN); Hugh Kidd (CAN)		
1987 Lake Inawashiro, Japan	James Hartley (GBR); Ian Tillett (GBR)		
1989 St Francis YC, San Francisco, USA	Neal McDonald (GBR); Duncan McDonald (GBR)		
1991 Royal Torbay YC, Torquay, UK	Martin Jones (GBR); Duncan McDonald (GBR)		
1993 Kingston, Ontario, Canada	Ian Walker (GBR); Chris Fox (GBR)		
1995 Vallensbaek, Denmark	Roddy Bridge (GBR); Adam Goodchild (GBR)		
1997	GBR 1340 Mighty White; Charles Stanley (GBR); Mo Gray (GBR)	GBR 1387 Granny Takes A trip Roddy Bridge (GBR); Adam Goodchild (GBR)	AUS 511 Ghost; Grant Geddes (AUS); Craig Watkin (AUS)
1999 Australia; Sandringham; 130 Boats	AUS 577; Grant Geddes (AUS); Craig Watkin (AUS)	GBR 1406; Charles Stanley (GBR); Mo Gray (GBR)	USA 1137; Zach Berkowitz; Karl Baldauf
2000 Great Britain; Beer; 116 Boats	USA 1127; Kris Bundy; Jamie Hanseler	GBR 1451; Colin Goodman (GBR); James Storey (GBR)	GBR 1440; Zeb Elliott (GBR); Dan Johnson (GBR)
2001 Bermuda; Hamilton; 54 Boats	USA 1137; Zach Berkowitz (USA); Trevor Baylis (USA)	GBR 1460; Zeb Elliott (GBR); Tim Hancock (USA)	USA 1127; Kris Bundy (USA); Jamie Hanseler (USA)
2003 Japan; Wakayama; 56 Boats	GBR 1482; Robert Greenhalgh (GBR); Dan Johnson (GBR)	USA 1137; Zach Berkowitz (USA); Mike Martin (USA)	GBR 1476; Archie Massey (GBR); George Nurton (GBR)
2005 New Zealand; Auckland; 83 Boats	AUS 631; Lindsey Irwin (AUS); Andrew Perry (AUS)	GBR 1513; Stevie Morrison (GBR); Ben Rhodes (GBR)	GBR 1511; James Fawcett (GBR); Dave Dobrijevic (GBR)
2006 United States; Long Beach; 71 Boats	USA 1168; Howard Hamlin (USA); Euan McNicol (USA)	CAN 600; Tina Bayliss (CAN); Trevor Baylis (USA)	USA 1173; Samuel "Shark" Kahn (USA); Paul Allen (USA)
2008 Germany; Warnemünder; 86 Boats	GBR 1519; Archie Massey (GBR); Matt Noble (GBR)	GBR 1536; Jarrod Simpson (GBR); Grant Rollerson (AUS)	AUS 653; Dave Alexander (AUS); Cameron McDonald (AUS)
2010 Australia; Sydney; 108 Boats (Gold & Silver Fleets)	AUS 1519; Archie Massey (GBR); Dan Wilsdon (GBR)	GBR 1541; Roger Gilbert (GBR); Ben McGrane (GBR)	AUS 656; Mark Krstic (AUS); Andrew Wilson (AUS)
2011 Great Britain; Weymouth; 71 Boats	GBR 1519; Archie Massey (GBR); Dan Wilsdon (GBR)	GBR 1541; Roger Gilbert (GBR); Ben McGrane (GBR)	GBR 1520; Katie Nurton (GBR); Nigel Ash (GBR)
2013 Canada; Toronto; 67 Boats	GBR 1519; Archie Massey (GBR); Dan Wilsdon (GBR)	GBR 1543; Sam Pascoe (GBR); Alex Knight (GBR)	GBR 1530; Andy FitzGerald (GBR); Richard Dobson (GBR)
2015 Australia; Geelong; 67 Boats	GBR 1543; Glen Truswell (GBR); Sam Pascoe (GBR)	GBR 1517; Ben McGrane (GBR); James Hughes (GBR)	AUS 661; Brad Devine (AUS); Ian Furlong (AUS)
2016 France; Carnac; 79 Boats	GBR 1553; Glen Truswell (GBR); Sam Pascoe (GBR)	GBR; Roger Gilbert (GBR); Ben McGrane (GBR)	GBR; Archie Massey (GBR); Harvey Hillary (GBR)
2018 United States; Richmond CA; 60 Boats	GBR 1559 - Penguin Dance; Andy Partington (GBR); Tom Partington (GBR)	GBR 1553 - Scrumpet; Neale Jones (GBR); Edward FitzGerald (GBR)	GER 28 - just in time Georg Borkenstein (GER); Eike Dietrich (GER)
2020 Australia; Perth; 65 Boats	GBR 1565; Archie Massey (GBR); Harvey Hillary (GBR)	GBR 1556; Daniel Holman (GBR); Alex Knight (GBR)	GBR 1553; Neale Jones (GBR); Edward Fitzgerald (GBR)
2022 Germany; Flensburg; 52 Boats	GBR 1565; Archie Massey (GBR); Harvey Hillary (GBR)	GBR 1553; Glen Truswell (GBR); Ed Fitzgerald (GBR)	GBR 1569; Andy Shaw (GBR); Rob Struckett (GBR)
2024 Italy; Lake Garda; 69 Boats	GBR 1569; Andy Shaw (GBR); Rob Struckett (GBR)|-	GBR 1553; Glen Truswell (GBR); Ed Fitzgerald (GBR)	AUS 679; Mark Krstic (AUS); James Lanati (AUS)

== Team Racing World Championship ==
Year	Gold	Silver	Bronze
2000 Itchenor	Australia	N/A	N/A
2001 Hamilton	United States	N/A	N/A
2003 Wakayama	Great Britain	United States	N/A
2005 Auckland	Great Britain	Australia	N/A
2006 Long Beach	Great Britain	Canada	United States
2008 Warnemünder	Great Britain	Germany	United Kingdom
2010 Sydney	Australia	Great Britain	N/A
2011 Weymouth	Cancelled due to strong wind		
2013 Toronto	Great Britain	Australia	Canada
2015 Geelong	Australia 1	Australia 2	North America
2016 Carnac	Great Britain	United States	Australia
2018 Richmond CA	Great Britain	Australia	Germany
2020 Perth	Great Britain	Australia	N/A
2022 Flensburg	Great Britain	Germany	Germany
2024 Lake Garda	Great Britain	Great Britain	Australia
