= Liam Green =

English footballer

Personal information
- Full name: Liam Thomas Green
- Date of birth: 17 March 1988 (age 38)
- Place of birth: Grimsby, England
- Position: Defender

Senior career*
Years	Team	Apps	(Gls)
2006–2007	Doncaster Rovers	2	(0)
2007–2009	Boston United	55	(0)
2009–2010	Ilkeston Town		
2010	Corby Town	3	(0)
2011–2012	Ilkeston	20	(1)
- * Club domestic league appearances and goals as of 06:30, 01 January 2012 (UTC)

Liam Thomas Green (born 17 March 1988) is an English footballer.

Green made two substitute appearances in the League One for Doncaster Rovers, before being released in May 2007. He signed for Boston United in July 2007.

He made 69 appearances in all competitions for the Pilgrims, scoring once. He then signed for Ilkeston Town, making 38 appearances in all competitions. When Ilkeston Town was liquidated, he joined Corby Town, where he made five appearances. He returned to the New Manor Ground to join the reformed Ilkeston, the successor club to Ilkeston Town, where he made 26 appearances and scored once.
