= Trade sale =

A trade sale is a common means of exit to a trade buyer. This allows the management to withdraw from the business and may open up the prospect of collaboration on larger projects. The term trade sale is mostly used in the context of venture capital funded businesses and refers to the sale of a company in its early stages.

It normally entails the disposal of a company's shares or assets and even liabilities, in whole or in part. This may refer to a strategic buyer who intends to grow their business or to a financial buyer who wants to generate a financial return on their invested capital at the time of exit.

Trade sales are the most frequently used as an exit vehicle both in Europe and the US.

The term trade sale may also refer to business-to-business sales, rather than sales made directly to the public.

== Exit route for investors ==
In venture capital and private equity, a trade sale is one of several possible exit routes through which investors realise value from a portfolio company. Other exit routes may include a sale to private equity investors, a stock market flotation, refinancing, or a sale to an employee ownership trust.

Trade sales are commonly used when a strategic buyer can acquire the business and integrate it into its existing operations, products, markets, or supply chain. In venture capital markets, surveys of fund managers identify trade sales as a major exit route for investee companies, alongside public listings and secondary sales.
