= Matt Noble =

English footballer

Personal information
- Full name: Matthew Noble
- Date of birth: 23 November 1988 (age 37)
- Place of birth: Newcastle upon Tyne, England
- Position: Defender

Team information
- Current team: Rochedale Rovers

Youth career
- Doncaster Rovers

Senior career*
Years	Team	Apps	(Gls)
2006–2008	Doncaster Rovers	0	(0)
2007	→Guiseley (loan)	11	
2008	Gateshead	0	(0)
2008	→Spennymoor Town (loan)	16	
2008–2009	Spennymoor Town	16	
2009–	Rochedale Rovers		
- * Club domestic league appearances and goals

Matt Noble (born 23 November 1988) is an English footballer, who plays for Rochedale Rovers Football Club. He was voted Doncaster Rovers Youth Player of the Season at the end of the 2006–07 season after making impressive performances in youth and reserve teams.

The 2007–08 season was Noble's first season as a full-time professional footballer after he signed his first professional contract at the end of the 2006-07 campaign, making the bench on three occasions during Doncaster Rovers' promotion season. During the 2007–08 season, Noble was loaned out to Guiseley.

Noble joined Gateshead at the beginning of the 2008–09 season after a successful pre-season trial period. He joined Spennymoor Town in September 2008, initially on loan, after only being named on the bench once in the first two months of the season at Gateshead. On 6 February 2011 signed for Rochedale Rovers Football Club.
