= EFL Trophy =

Association football tournament in England

- Organiser(s): English Football League
- Founded: 1983; 43 years ago (as the Associate Members' Cup)
- Region: England; Wales
- Teams: 64
- Current champions: Luton Town (2nd title)
- Most championships: Bristol City; Peterborough United (3 titles each)
- 2026–27 EFL Trophy

The English Football League Trophy, known as the Jersey Mike's Trophy for sponsorship reasons, is an annual English football knockout competition open to all clubs in EFL League One, EFL League Two, and U-21 teams from the Premier League and the EFL Championship.

Launched in the 1983–84 football season as the Associate Members' Cup, the competition was renamed the Football League Trophy in 1992 after a reorganisation following the formation of the Premier League and again as the current EFL Trophy in 2016 due to The Football League changing its name to the English Football League.

The current competition begins with 16 regional groups, each containing four teams and divided between northern and southern sections depending on the clubs' geographic locations. The top two from each group qualify for the knockout stages before the two winners meet in late March or early April in the final at Wembley Stadium. Some Midlands and East Anglian clubs fluctuate between the north and south each season for every draw. Other details have varied over the years, including in some years inviting clubs from the National League, and holding a round-robin group stage before moving into knockout rounds.

The most successful clubs are Bristol City and Peterborough United, who have lifted the trophy three times each. The current winners are Luton Town, who defeated Stockport County 3–1 in the 2026 final at Wembley Stadium.

== History ==
The competition was created in 1983, and was open to Third and Fourth Division Football League clubs (levels 3 and 4 of the English football pyramid). The competition was introduced to give clubs in the lower divisions of the Football League a more realistic opportunity to play at Wembley. It replaced the Football League Group Cup (known as the Football League Trophy in its final season), in which some (but not all) Third and Fourth Division teams had competed. The first winners of the competition were Bournemouth.

In 1992 the tournament rebranded as the Football League Trophy, coinciding with a reorganisation following the decision of the First Division clubs at the time to form the Premier League.

In 2016 the competition rebranded to the current EFL Trophy after The Football League rebranding as the English Football League. The first season under the new name saw 16 Category One academies of Premier League and EFL Championship clubs join the competition.

In 2023 participating clubs received a £20,000 participation fee, with £10,000 per victory and £5,000 per draw in the group stage, and increasing prizes for the knockout matches up to £100,000 for winning the final.

== Formats ==
=== Associate Members' Cup ===
==== 1983 to 1985 ====
The 48 clubs of the Third and Fourth Divisions were split into North and South sections of 24 teams each. The first round had 12 knockout ties in each section, and the second had six. In each section, the two second-round losers with the 'narrowest' defeats were reprieved and joined the six other clubs in the regional quarter-finals.

==== 1985 to 1992 ====
For the 1985–86 edition, 8 three-team groups were introduced in each of the two sections. Teams played one home and one away game and the group winners proceeded to the regional knockout stages. This was modified in the following season, with two teams qualifying from each group, resulting in an additional 'round of 16' knockout stage in each section.

=== Football League Trophy ===
==== 1992 to 1996 ====
For a number of seasons in the early to mid-1990s, the competition ran with seven 3-team groups, two teams in each section receiving a bye into the knockout stages. This was a direct result of the folding of Aldershot and Maidstone United necessitating a reorganisation of the competition to accommodate fewer than 48 teams in the tournament.

==== 1996 to 2000 ====
The group phase was abolished for the 1996–97 edition. The regional sections were retained and 8 teams in each section received a bye to the second round.

==== 2000 to 2006 ====
For the 2000–01 season, 8 teams in level 5 (step 1) of the football pyramid were invited to participate in the tournament, resulting in 12 ties in each of the north/south sections in the first round, with only four teams in each section receiving a bye into the second round. The number of invitees increased to 12 from 2002–03, resulting in 14 first-round ties, and two teams in each regional section gaining a bye into the second round.

===== Invited teams =====
The teams from the Conference invited by season are as follows:

- 2000–01: Chester City, Doncaster Rovers, Dover Athletic, Hereford United, Morecambe, Rushden & Diamonds, Scarborough, Yeovil Town
- 2001–02: Barnet, Dagenham & Redbridge, Doncaster Rovers, Leigh RMI, Scarborough, Southport, Stevenage Borough, Yeovil Town
- 2002–03: Chester City, Dagenham & Redbridge, Doncaster Rovers, Halifax Town, Hereford United, Leigh RMI, Morecambe, Scarborough, Southport, Stevenage Borough, Woking, Yeovil Town
- 2003–04: Barnet, Chester City, Dagenham & Redbridge, Exeter City, Forest Green Rovers, Halifax Town, Hereford United, Morecambe, Scarborough, Shrewsbury Town, Stevenage Borough, Telford United
- 2004–05: Accrington Stanley, Aldershot Town, Barnet, Carlisle United, Dagenham & Redbridge, Exeter City, Hereford United, Morecambe, Scarborough, Stevenage Borough, Woking, York City
- 2005–06: Accrington Stanley, Aldershot Town, Cambridge United, Crawley Town, Dagenham & Redbridge, Exeter City, Halifax Town, Hereford United, Kidderminster Harriers, Morecambe, Stevenage Borough, Woking

==== 2006 to 2016 ====
For the 2006–07 tournament onward, the Conference team invitations were abolished. This resulted in the format reverting to 8 first-round matches in each section, and 8 sides receiving byes to the second round. Due to a number of clubs fielding weakened teams in the competition, a rule was introduced which required a minimum of six first-team regulars to be named in the starting lineup.

=== EFL Trophy ===
==== 2016 to present ====
64 teams enter from Round One; all 48 teams from levels three and four of the football pyramid (League One and League Two), along with 16 category 1 Premier League and EFL Championship academy/under-21 sides. 16 regional groups of four teams split evenly 8 northern and 8 southern. Each of the groups contains one academy team. The top two from each group progress to the knockout stages; up to and including the quarter-final the tournament remains regionalised before becoming an open draw from the semi-finals onwards.

During the group phase, if the scores are level at the end of the match, then penalties are taken immediately without recourse to extra time. The winning team is awarded 2 points and the losing team 1 point. During the knock-out phase, up to but not including the final, if the scores are level at the end of the match the winner is decided by penalties. In the final, if the scores are equal after 90 minutes an extra 30 minutes are played and if still equal the winner is then decided by penalties.

===== Academy teams =====
The following academy teams have competed:

- Current (2023–24): Arsenal (since 2018–19), Aston Villa (since 2019–20), Brighton & Hove Albion (since 2016–17), Chelsea (since 2016–17), Crystal Palace (since 2021–22), Everton (from 2016–17 to 2019–20 and since 2021–22), Fulham (from 2017–18 to 2020–21 and since 2023–24), Leeds United (from 2020–21 to 2022–23 and since 2025–26), Leicester City (since 2016–17), Liverpool (since 2019–20), Manchester City (since 2017–18), Manchester United (since 2019–20), Newcastle United (since 2017–18), Nottingham Forest (since 2023–24), Tottenham Hotspur (from 2017–18 to 2019–20 and since 2021–22), West Ham United (since 2016–17), Wolverhampton Wanderers (from 2016–17 and since 2018–19)
- Former: Blackburn Rovers (from 2016–17), Derby County (from 2016–17), Norwich City (from 2016–17 and from 2019–20 to 2020–21), Middlesbrough (from 2016–17 to 2018–19), Reading (from 2016–17 to 2017–18), Southampton (from 2016–17 to 2022–23), Stoke City (from 2016–17 to 2018–19), Sunderland (from 2016–17 to 2017–18), Swansea City (from 2016–17 to 2018–19), West Bromwich Albion (from 2016–17 to 2018–19 and from 2020–21)

== Finals ==
=== Venue ===
The final of the EFL Trophy is currently held at Wembley Stadium in London, the English national stadium. The final in 1984 was due to be played at the previous Wembley Stadium, but owing to damage caused to the pitch during the Horse of the Year Show, it was moved to Boothferry Park in Hull. From 2001 to 2007, during the building of the new Wembley, the Football League Trophy finals were played at the Millennium Stadium in Cardiff.

=== Winners ===
List of tournament winners:

Key

† : Final Round of Tournament Cancelled or Postponed
§ : Club Reinstated at an earlier stage.

- 1983–84: Bournemouth
- 1984–85: Wigan Athletic
- 1985–86: Bristol City
- 1986–87: Mansfield Town
- 1987–88: Wolverhampton Wanderers
- 1988–89: Bolton Wanderers
- 1989–90: Tranmere Rovers
- 1990–91: Birmingham City
- 1991–92: Stoke City
- 1992–93: Port Vale
- 1993–94: Swansea City
- 1994–95: Birmingham City (2)
- 1995–96: Rotherham United
- 1996–97: Carlisle United
- 1997–98: Grimsby Town
- 1998–99: Wigan Athletic (2)
- 1999–2000: Stoke City (2)
- 2000–01: Port Vale (2)
- 2001–02: Blackpool
- 2002–03: Bristol City (2)
- 2003–04: Blackpool (2)
- 2004–05: Wrexham
- 2005–06: Swansea City (2)
- 2006–07: Doncaster Rovers
- 2007–08: Milton Keynes Dons
- 2008–09: Luton Town
- 2009–10: Southampton
- 2010–11: Carlisle United (2)
- 2011–12: Chesterfield
- 2012–13: Crewe Alexandra
- 2013–14: Peterborough United
- 2014–15: Bristol City (3)
- 2015–16: Barnsley
- 2016–17: Coventry City
- 2017–18: Lincoln City
- 2018–19: Portsmouth
- 2019–20: † Salford City
- 2020–21: Sunderland
- 2021–22: Rotherham United (2)
- 2022–23: Bolton Wanderers (2)
- 2023–24: Peterborough United (2)
- 2024–25: Peterborough United (3)
- 2025–26: § Luton Town (2)

== Records ==
=== Attendances ===
The overall record attendance for the final is 85,021, set at the Wembley Stadium in 2019 by Portsmouth and Sunderland. The record attendance for the final at the original Wembley Stadium was 80,841, set in the 1988 final between Wolverhampton Wanderers and Burnley. The record attendance for the final at the Millennium Stadium in Cardiff was 59,024, set in the 2007 final between Bristol Rovers and Doncaster Rovers. The 2020 and 2021 finals were played behind closed doors, but clubs raised money for charity by selling supporters virtual tickets

EFL Trophy final attendance records
Stadium	Attendance record	Year (Final)	Winner	Finalist	Result
Wembley Stadium (new)	85,021	2019	Portsmouth	Sunderland	2–2 (5–4 pen.)
Millennium Stadium	59,024	2007	Doncaster Rovers	Bristol Rovers	3–2 (a.e.t.)
Wembley Stadium (old)	80,841	1988	Wolverhampton Wanderers	Burnley	2–0

The highest attendance for any game apart from the final came on 5 February 2013 for the Northern Area final, when Coventry City lost to Crewe Alexandra 3–0 at the Ricoh Arena in Coventry (they later won the away leg 2–0, going down 3–2 on aggregate), in front of a crowd of 31,054.

The lowest attendance in the history of the competition (excluding those affected by pandemic restrictions) came during the 2018–19 season when just 202 attended a Middlesbrough academy team's 1–0 victory against Burton Albion in November 2018 at Burton's Pirelli Stadium. The biggest ever margin of victory came at St James Park of Exeter City when Reading ran riot and won 9-0.

=== Winners ===
Although the competition has existed, in various formats, since 1983-84, it was not until Peterborough United in 2024-25 that a team had won the trophy in consecutive seasons. One reason for this is that, on occasion, teams that win the tournament also achieve promotion to the second tier in the same campaign, thus meaning they are ineligible to defend their title for the following season. Peterborough also have the joint most number of overall trophy wins along with Bristol City; both teams have won the competition three times.

== Sponsors ==
From 1984 to the present (except 1983–84), the League Trophy has attracted title sponsorship, giving it the following names:

Period	Sponsor	Name	Trophy
1983–1984	None	Associate Members Cup	Original
1984–1987	Freight Rover	Freight Rover Trophy	Original
1987–1989	LDV Group	Sherpa Van Trophy	Original
1989–1992	Leyland DAF	Leyland DAF Cup	Shield
1992–1994	Autoglass	Autoglass Trophy	Shield
1994–2000	Auto Windscreens	Auto Windscreens Shield	Shield
2000–2007	LDV Group	LDV Vans Trophy (Note: LDV Vans entered administration in 2007 and the final in March 2007 was branded as the Football League Trophy Final)	New
2007–2016	PPG Industries	Johnstone's Paint Trophy	New
2016–2019	Checkatrade.com	Checkatrade Trophy	New
2019–2020	Leasing.com	Leasing.com Trophy (Note: Since Leasing.com no longer sponsored the competition in 2021, and the 2020 final was delayed by an entire year, the 2019–20 final was actually branded as the 2020 Papa John's Trophy Final)	New
2020–2023	Papa John's	Papa Johns Trophy (Note: Originally branded as Papa John's Trophy before dropping the apostrophe during the 2021–22 season.)	New
2023–2024	Vertu Motors	Bristol Street Motors Trophy (Note: The branding did not come into effect until after the group stage of the 2023–24 competition. As such, the competition was referred to as "EFL Trophy" in the early stages with the later rounds referred to as "Bristol Street Motors Trophy".)	New
2024–2026	Vertu Motors	Vertu Trophy (Note: The name changed in the middle of the 2024–25 season. During the group stage, it was known as the "Bristol Street Motors Trophy".)	New
2026–present	Jersey Mike's Subs	Jersey Mike's Trophy	New

== See also ==
- Full Members' Cup
- Football League Third Division North Cup
- Football League Third Division South Cup
