= Russell Dingwall =

Scottish footballer

Personal information
- Date of birth: 26 June 1997 (age 29)
- Place of birth: Inverness, Scotland
- Position: Midfielder

Team information
- Current team: Elgin City
- Number: 7

Youth career
- –2017: Ross County

Senior career*
Years	Team	Apps	(Gls)
2017–2019	Ross County	1	(0)
2018	→ Forfar Athletic (loan)	14	(1)
2019	→ Stenhousemuir (loan)	12	(0)
2019–	Elgin City	216	(37)
- * Club domestic league appearances and goals as of 4 May 2026

Russell Dingwall (born 26 June 1997) is a Scottish professional footballer who plays as a midfielder for Scottish League Two club Elgin City. Dingwall has also previously played for Ross County as well as Forfar Athletic and Stenhousemuir on loan.

== Career ==
=== Ross County ===
Dingwall was part of the Ross County Under-20s team that won the 2016–17 SPFL Development League for the first time in the club's history and after interest from clubs such as Valencia this earned him a professional contract with the club in 2017. He made his professional debut for Ross County coming off the bench to replace Jim O'Brien against Kilmarnock in the Scottish Premiership on 20 May 2017, playing the final seven minutes of the match. He received the man of the match award for this brief cameo.

=== Forfar (loan) ===
On 26 January 2018 Dingwall joined Scottish League 1 side Forfar Athletic for the rest of the season along with teammate Ross Maciver.

== Personal life ==
Russell's brother Tony is also a professional footballer and currently plays for Brora Rangers.

== Career statistics ==
As of match played 10 May 2025

Appearances and goals by club, season and competition
Club	Season	League			Cup		League Cup		Other		Total	
Club	Season	Division	Apps	Goals	Apps	Goals	Apps	Goals	Apps	Goals	Apps	Goals
Ross County Under 20s	2016–17	—	0	0	0	0	0	0	1 (Note: Appearances in the Scottish Challenge Cup)	0	1	0
Ross County Under 20s	2017–18	—	0	0	0	0	0	0	2	0	2	0
Ross County Under 20s	Total		0	0	0	0	0	0	3	0	3	0
Ross County	2016–17	Scottish Premiership	1	0	0	0	0	0	0	0	1	0
Ross County	2017–18	Scottish Premiership	0	0	0	0	0	0	0	0	0	0
Ross County	2018–19	Scottish Championship	0	0	0	0	0	0	1	0	1	0
Ross County	Total		1	0	0	0	0	0	1	0	2	0
Forfar Athletic (loan)	2017–18	Scottish League One	14	1	0	0	0	0	0	0	14	1
Stenhousemuir (loan)	2018–19	Scottish League One	12	0	1	0	0	0	1 (Note: Appearances in the League One play-offs)	0	14	0
Elgin City	2019–20	Scottish League Two	27	0	2	0	4	1	5	0	38	1
Elgin City	2020–21	Scottish League Two	22	5	1	0	4	1	2	0	29	6
Elgin City	2021–22	Scottish League Two	36	1	2	0	4	0	2	0	44	1
Elgin City	2022–23	Scottish League Two	36	11	4	1	2	1	4	2	46	15
Elgin City	2023–24	Scottish League Two	31	6	0	0	4	1	2	0	37	7
Elgin City	2024–25	Scottish League Two	34	9	3	0	3	0	4 (Note: Two appearances in the Scottish Challenge Cup and two in the League One play-offs)	1	44	10
Elgin City	Total		186	32	12	1	21	4	19	3	238	40
Career total			187	32	12	1	21	4	23	3	243	40
