= Tim Chow =

Taiwanese footballer (born 1994)

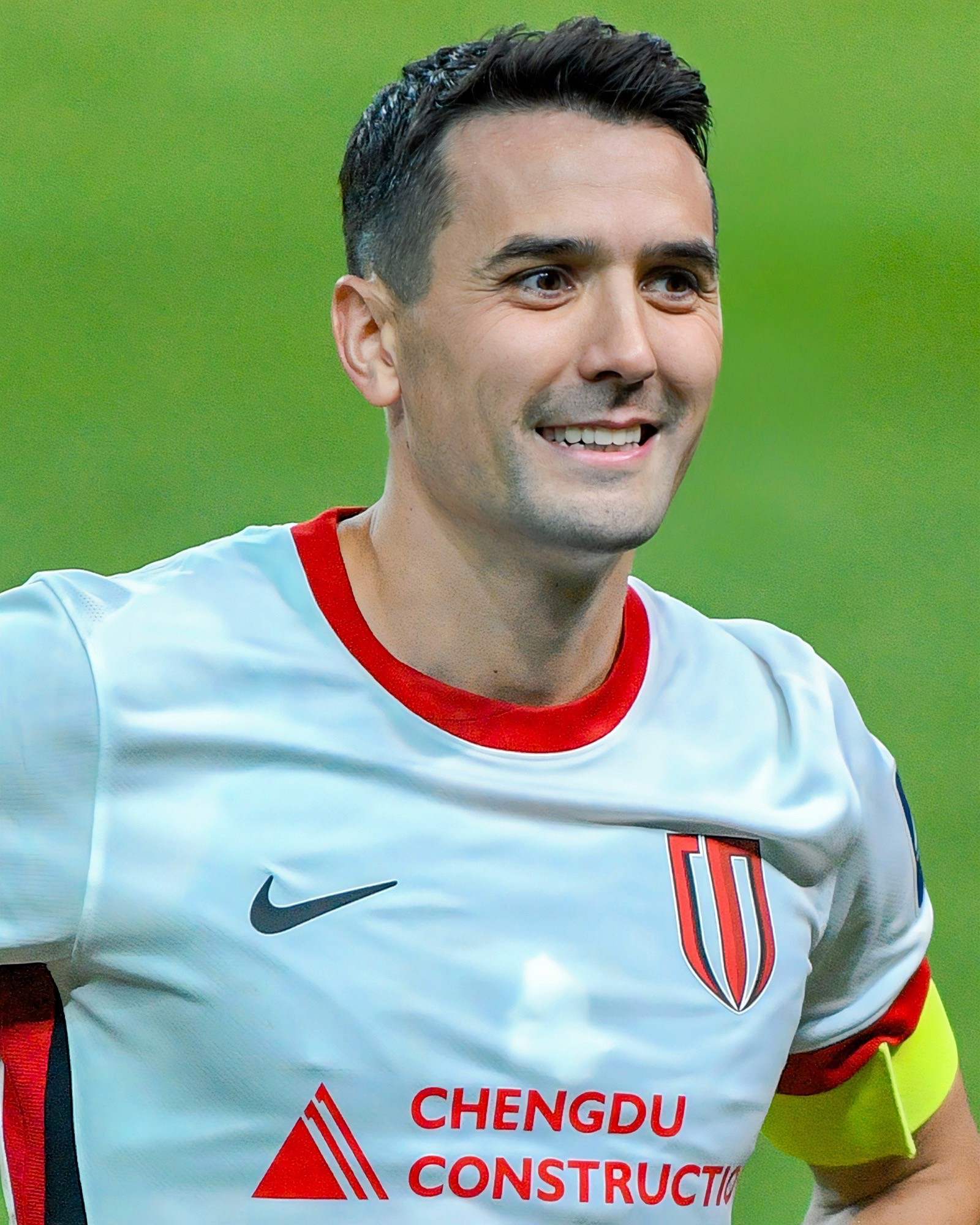
- Chow in 2025

Personal information
- Full name: Timothy Alexander Chow
- Date of birth: 18 January 1994 (age 32)
- Place of birth: Wigan, England
- Height: 1.80 m (5 ft 11 in)
- Position: Midfielder

Team information
- Current team: Shenzhen Peng City
- Number: 8

Youth career
- 2003–2012: Wigan Athletic

Senior career*
Years	Team	Apps	(Gls)
2012–2016	Wigan Athletic	16	(1)
2016–2018	Ross County	44	(2)
2018–2019	Spartak Subotica	6	(0)
2019–2021	Henan Songshan Longmen	56	(2)
2022–2025	Chengdu Rongcheng	111	(19)
2026–	Shenzhen Peng City	29	(4)

International career^{‡}
2017	Chinese Taipei	1	(0)
- * Club domestic league appearances and goals as of 22 November 2026 ‡ National team caps and goals as of 22:04, 7 January 2023 (UTC)

Timothy Alexander Chow (born 18 January 1994), also known as Chou Ting-yang (Chinese: 周定洋; pinyin: Zhōu Dìngyáng), is a professional footballer who plays as a midfielder for and captains Chinese Super League club Shenzhen Peng City. Born in England, he has played for the Chinese Taipei national team.

He has previously played for Wigan Athletic and Ross County.

== Club career ==
=== Wigan Athletic ===
Born in Wigan, Greater Manchester to a father of Chinese descent and an English mother, Chow started his career with his hometown club Wigan Athletic, joining the club at the age of nine after being spotted by a Wigan scout whilst playing for Blackbrook JFC. He progressed through the youth system at the club and signed his first professional contract in 2012, signing a two-year deal.

On 12 August 2014 he was called up for a matchday squad for the first time, remaining an unused substitute as Wigan lost 1–2 away to League Two club Burton Albion in the first round of the League Cup at the Pirelli Stadium. His next call-up was on 3 January 2015 in the third round of the FA Cup away to rivals Bolton Wanderers at the Macron Stadium, again remaining unused as they lost 0–1.

He made his debut for the club on his first league call-up on 14 April 2015, appearing as a substitute for Jermaine Pennant for the last nine minutes of a Championship game away to Millwall, a 0–2 defeat at The New Den. Four days later, he made his first start on his first appearance at the DW Stadium, against Brighton & Hove Albion. In the 26th minute, he scored his first professional goal, opening a 2–1 win by heading in Pennant's cross.

Earlier in April, Chow had been told by Wigan manager Malky Mackay that he would be released at the end of the season. However, new manager Gary Caldwell gave him a new contract. Chow reflected to BBC Radio Manchester that "I had a few other options and I was basically looking at a new club for the summer, but it's a funny old game, isn't it?"

=== Ross County ===
On 25 August 2016, Chow signed for Scottish Premiership club Ross County on a two-year contract. He made his debut for the Dingwall-based team two days later, replacing Christopher Routis in the 59th minute of a 1–0 loss at Hamilton Academical. On 15 October, he was sent off after 21 minutes of a 4–0 loss at Aberdeen for a foul on Jonny Hayes. He scored his first goal for the club in a 6–2 win against Dundee United in the Scottish Cup on 21 January 2017.

=== Spartak Subotica ===
In summer 2018, Chow was on trials at Serbian side FK Spartak Subotica. After successful trials, he asked to delay his signing because of the possibility to sign with Spanish La Liga side Deportivo Alavés. When Spartak Subotica passed to the third round of the 2018–19 UEFA Europa League after beating AC Sparta Prague and Alavés move was still unclear, Chow decided to sign with Spartak becoming, by early August, their latest reinforcement along Ukrainian youth international Serhiy Kulynych.

=== Henan Jianye ===
In 2019, Tim Chow completed his first season for Chinese club Henan Jianye, scoring 2 goals.

=== Chengdu Rongcheng ===
On 25 April 2022, Tim Chow joined Chinese Super League club Chengdu Rongcheng.

=== Shenzhen Peng City ===
On 13 January 2026, Chow joined another Chinese Super League club Shenzhen Peng City.

== International career ==
After obtaining the Republic of China passport on 30 October 2017, he was called up to the national squad for the 14 November 2017 game against Turkmenistan. Though he started the game, but could not prevent a 2–1 loss which saw Chinese Taipei fail to qualify for the 2019 AFC Asian Cup.

== Personal life ==
Chow is of three quarters English ancestry, and one quarter Chinese ancestry from his grandfather who was from Ningbo, Zhejiang, and moved to Taiwan after World War II before moving again to the United Kingdom. It was proved that Chow has Taiwanese nationality after he went to Ningbo to look for his grandfather's birth certificate. Chow has stated that he would be interested in representing Chinese Taipei at international level, which he later did.

== Career statistics ==
As of match played on 8 June 2023

Appearances and goals by club, season and competition
Club	Season	League			National Cup		League Cup		Other		Total	
Club	Season	Division	Apps	Goals	Apps	Goals	Apps	Goals	Apps	Goals	Apps	Goals
Wigan Athletic	2014–15	Championship	4	1	0	0	0	0	—		4	1
Wigan Athletic	2015–16	League One	11	0	0	0	0	0	2 (Note: Appearances in the Football League Trophy)	0	13	0
Wigan Athletic	2016–17	Championship	1	0	0	0	1	0	—		2	0
Wigan Athletic	Total		16	1	0	0	1	0	2	0	19	1
Ross County	2016–17	Scottish Premiership	30	1	2	1	0	0	—		32	2
Ross County	2017–18	Scottish Premiership	14	1	1	0	5	0	—		20	1
Ross County	Total		44	2	3	1	5	0	0	0	52	3
Spartak Subotica	2018–19	Serbian SuperLiga	6	0	1	0	—		2 (Note: Appearances in the 2018–19 UEFA Europa League)	0	9	0
Henan Jianye	2019	Chinese Super League	26	2	0	0	—		—		26	2
Henan Jianye	2020	Chinese Super League	17	0	0	0	—		—		17	0
Henan Jianye	2021	Chinese Super League	13	0	0	0	—		—		13	0
Henan Jianye	Total		56	2	0	0	0	0	0	0	56	2
Chengdu Rongcheng	2022	Chinese Super League	27	3	0	0	—		—		27	3
Chengdu Rongcheng	2023	Chinese Super League	12	1	0	0	—		—		12	1
Chengdu Rongcheng	Total		39	4	0	0	0	0	0	0	39	4
Career total			161	9	4	1	6	0	4	0	175	10

== Honours ==
Wigan Athletic

- EFL League One: 2015–16,
