= 2016–17 Ross County F.C. season =

Ross County
2016–17 season
- Chairman: Roy MacGregor
- Manager: Jim McIntyre
- Stadium: Victoria Park
- Premiership: Seventh place
- League Cup: Group Stage
- Scottish Cup: Fifth round
- Top goalscorer: League: Liam Boyce (23); All: Liam Boyce (24)
- Highest home attendance: 6,590 vs Rangers; Premiership; 6 November 2016
- Lowest home attendance: 722 vs Cove Rangers; League Cup; 30 July 2016
- Average home league attendance: 4,103
Home colours	Away colours

The 2016–17 season was the club's 4th season in the Scottish Premiership and their fifth consecutive appearance in the top flight of Scottish football. Ross County also competed in the Scottish Cup and the League Cup, having won the League Cup the previous year for the first time in their history.

== Season summary ==
County were unable to retain the trophy after being knocked out of the Group Stages in a new format introduced by the SPFL. County U20s won the Development League, managed by Stuart Kettlewell. Liam Boyce finished the season on 23 league goals and was the top goalscorer in the Scottish Premiership.

== Results and fixtures ==
Win Draw Loss Postponed

=== Pre-season ===
5 July 2016 Friendly	Paksi FC	1–3	Ross County	Budapest, Hungary
18:00	Kovács 41'	1	Schalk 15', 32'; Graham 79'	Stadium: Globall Sport Complex

8 July 2016 Friendly	Soroksár SC	1–1	Ross County	Budapest, Hungary
18:00	Koós 9'	2	Irvine 45'	Stadium: Globall Sport Complex

=== Scottish Premiership ===
6 August 2016 1	Ross County	1–3	Dundee	Victoria Park
15:00	Curran 67'	Report	Loy 13', 41' (pen.); McGowan 62'	Attendance: 3,669; Referee: Madden

13 August 2016 2	Inverness Caledonian Thistle	2–3	Ross County	Tulloch Caledonian Stadium
15:00	Boden 45'; Draper 65'	Report	Boyce 7', 26', 47'	Attendance: 4,204; Referee: Dallas

20 August 2016 3	Ross County	2–0	Kilmarnock	Victoria Park
15:00	Boyce 29', 74'	Report		Attendance: 3,263; Referee: Walsh

27 August 2016 4	Hamilton Academical	1–0	Ross County	New Douglas Park
15:00	Imrie 74'	Report		Attendance: 1,609; Referee: Aitken

10 September 2016 5	Ross County	1–1	Motherwell	Victoria Park
15:00	Boyce 61'; McEveley (yellow card) 24' (yellow-red card) 70'	Report	Moult 41' (pen.)	Attendance: 3,019; Referee: Muir

17 September 2016 6	Rangers	0–0	Ross County	Ibrox Stadium
15:00		Report		Attendance: 47,935; Referee: Aitken

24 September 2016 7	Heart of Midlothian	0–0	Ross County	Tynecastle Stadium
15:00	Rherras (yellow card) 55'; Djoum (yellow card) 87'	BBC Report; SPFL Report	Woods (yellow card) 50'; Dingwall (yellow card) 57'; McShane (yellow card) 81' (yellow-red card) 83'; Fraser (yellow card) 90'	Attendance: 16,321; Referee: Muir

1 October 2016 8	Ross County	0–2	St Johnstone	Victoria Park
15:00	Woods (yellow card) 90+3'	BBC Report; SPFL Report	Swanson 42' (pen.); Kane 73'; Foster (yellow card) 90+2'	Attendance: 3,299; Referee: Allan

15 October 2016 9	Aberdeen	4–0	Ross County	Pittodrie Stadium
15:00	Hayes 20'; Logan 32'; Reynolds (yellow card) 67'; McGinn 68'; Stockley 78'	Report; SPFL Report	Fraser (yellow card) 12'; Chow (red card) 21'; Davies (yellow card) 73'	Attendance: 10,091; Referee: Thomson

22 October 2016 10	Partick Thistle	1–1	Ross County	Firhill Stadium
15:00	Welsh 20'; Azeez (yellow card) 58'	BBC Report; SPFL Report	Davies (yellow card) 12'; Curran (yellow card) 50'; Dow (yellow card) 90+3'; Burke 90+5'	Attendance: 3,777; Referee: Robertson

26 October 2016 11	Ross County	0–4	Celtic	Victoria Park
19:45	Dow (yellow card) 64'; McEveley (yellow card) 86'	BBC Sport; SPFL Report	Roberts 3'; Armstrong 83'; Griffiths (yellow card) 44'; Gordon (yellow card) 73'; Sinclair 90+1'; Dembélé 90+3'	Attendance: 6,290; Referee: Muir

22 October 2016 12	Motherwell	4–1	Ross County	Fir Park
15:00	McDonald 8' van der Weg 32' (o.g.); Heneghan (yellow card) 49'; Tait 51'; Ainsworth 62'	BBC Report; SPFL Report	van der Weg (yellow card) 39'; Quinn (yellow card) 53'; Schalk 78'	Attendance: 3,177; Referee: Walsh

6 November 2016 13	Ross County	1–1	Rangers	Victoria Park
12:00	McEveley (yellow card) 11'; Davies 26'; Chow (yellow card) 61'; Dow (yellow card) 76'; Dingwall (yellow card) 78'; Routis (yellow card) 82'; Burke (yellow card) 86'	BBC Report; SPFL Report	Hill 8'; Holt (yellow card) 67'; Waghorn (yellow card) 74'	Attendance: 6,590; Referee: Dallas

19 November 2016 14	St Johnstone	2–4	Ross County	McDiarmid Park
15:00	Anderson (yellow card) 4'; Paton (yellow card) 55'; Foster (yellow card) 62'; Swanson 65' (pen.); MacLean 80'	BBC Report; SPFL Report	McEveley 24' (yellow card) 65'; Routis 38' van der Weg (yellow card) 45+4'; Curran 63'; Boyce 83'	Attendance: 2,554; Referee: Beaton

26 November 2016 15	Ross County	1–1	Hamilton Academical	Victoria Park
15:00	Boyce 39'	BBC Report	Crawford 77'	Attendance: 3,275; Referee: Thomson

3 December 2016 16	Ross County	2–2	Heart of Midlothian	Victoria Park
15:00	McEveley 43'; Boyce 86' (pen.)	BBC Report	Djoum 66'; Paterson 67'	Attendance: 4,042; Referee: Collum

10 December 2016 17	Dundee	0–0	Ross County	Dens Park
15:00		BBC Report		Attendance: 4,742; Referee: Anderson

17 December 2016 18	Ross County	2–1	Aberdeen	Victoria Park
15:00	Boyce 26'; Dow 88'	BBC Report; SPFL Report	McGinn 68'	Attendance: 4,467; Referee: Thomson

23 December 2016 19	Ross County	1–3	Partick Thistle	Victoria Park
19:45	Boyce 83'	BBC Report; SPFL Report	Lindsay 50'; Doolan 62'; Erskine 78'	Attendance: 2,935; Referee: Beaton

28 December 2016 20	Celtic	2–0	Ross County	Celtic Park
15:00	Sviatchenko 38'; Armstrong 45+1'	BBC Sport; SPFL Report		Attendance: 55,355; Referee: Walsh

31 December 2016 21	Ross County	3–2	Inverness Caledonian Thistle	Victoria Park
15:00	Boyce 2', 35'; Woods 61'	BBC Report; SPFL Report	Tremarco 28'; Fisher 81'	Attendance: 5,111; Referee: Madden

28 January 2017 22	Kilmarnock	3–2	Ross County	Rugby Park
15:00	Boyd 1'; Dicker 61'; Longstaff 90'	BBC Sport; SPFL Report	Routis 7'; Schalk 11'	Attendance: 3,207; Referee: Barry Cook

31 January 2017 23	Ross County	1–2	Motherwell	Victoria Park
15:00	McEveley 34'	BBC Report; SPFL Report	McDonald 28'; Moult 54'	Attendance: 2,511; Referee: McLean

4 February 2017 24	Rangers	1–1	Ross County	Ibrox Stadium
15:00	Wallace 71'	BBC Report; SPFL Report	Schalk 18'	Attendance: 49,428; Referee: Don Robertson

18 February 2017 25	Ross County	1–2	St Johnstone	Victoria Park
15:00	Curran 73'; O'Brien (yellow card) 76'	BBC Report	McEveley 31' (o.g.); Kane 90+1'	Attendance: 3,187; Referee: Beaton

25 February 2017 26	Aberdeen	1–0	Ross County	Pittodrie Stadium
15:00	Reynolds (yellow card) 27'; Rooney 69'	BBC Report; SPFL Report	Gardyne (yellow card) 23'	Attendance: 11,774; Referee: Collum

1 March 2017 27	Heart Of Midlothian	0–1	Ross County	Tynecastle Stadium
19:45	Struna (yellow card) 16'	BBC Report	Chow (yellow card) 15'; Schalk 51'; Boyce (yellow card) 68'	Attendance: 15,470; Referee: Muir

11 March 2017 28	Ross County	1–2	Kilmarnock	Victoria Park
15:00	Boyce (yellow card) 38' (goal) 58' van der Weg (yellow card) 74'; Curran (yellow card) 79'; Chow (yellow card) 80'	BBC Report	Sammon 46'; Boyd 85'; Roberts (yellow card) 32'; Hendrie (yellow card) 64'; Taylor (yellow card) 79'	Attendance: 3,380; Referee: Nick Walsh

18 March 2017 29	Inverness Caledonian Thistle	1–1	Ross County	Tulloch Caledonian Stadium
15:00	Tansey 48'; Tremarco (yellow card) 88'	BBC Report	Naismith (yellow card) 52'; Schalk 86'	Attendance: 4,123; Referee: Crawford Allan

1 April 2017 30	Partick Thistle	2–1	Ross County	Firhill Stadium
15:00	Doolan 64', 79' (yellow card) 65'; Edwards (yellow card) 68'; Lawless (yellow card) 74'	BBC Report	Curran 58'; Fraser (yellow card) 84'	Attendance: 3,149; Referee: Collum

4 April 2017 31	Ross County	2–1	Dundee	Victoria Park
19:45	Chow 7'; Davies (yellow card) 25'; O'Brien (yellow card) 56' (yellow-red card) 81'; Boyce 90' (pen.); Curran (yellow card) 90+1'	BBC Report	O'Dea (yellow card) 26' (goal) 45' (pen.); O'Hara (yellow card) 90+1'; Williams (yellow card) 52' (yellow-red card) 90+2'	Attendance: 2,819; Referee: Beaton

8 April 2017 32	Hamilton Academical	1–1	Ross County	New Douglas Park
15:00	Donati 3'; Bingham (yellow card) 15'; McMann (yellow card) 37'; Skondras (red card) 45'; Devlin (yellow card) 57'	BBC Report	Curran 60'	Attendance: 1,548; Referee: McLean

16 April 2017 33	Ross County	2–2	Celtic	Victoria Park
12:30	Gardyne (yellow card) 40' (goal) 50'; O'Brien (yellow card) 76'; Boyce 90' (pen.) (yellow card) 90+1'; Davies (yellow card) 90+3'	BBC Report	Tierney 34'; Roberts 78'; Šimunović (yellow card) 88'; Brown (red card) 90+2'	Attendance: 6,205; Referee: Don Robertson

28 April 2017 34	Ross County	4–0	Inverness Caledonian Thistle	Victoria Park
19:45	O'Brien (yellow card) 10'; Boyce 21', 34', 49' (pen.), 60' (pen.); Chow (yellow card) 53'	BBC Report	Vigurs (yellow card) 49'; Polworth (red card) 60'	Attendance: 4,928; Referee: Thomson

6 May 2017 35	Motherwell	0–1	Ross County	Fir Park
15:00		BBC Report	van der Weg (yellow card) 44'; O'Brien (yellow card) 61'; Routis 72'	Attendance: 3,870; Referee: Madden

13 May 2017 36	Dundee	1–1	Ross County	Dens Park
15:00	McGowan (yellow card) 62'; Vincent (yellow card) 63'; O'Dea 76' (pen.) (yellow card) 77'	BBC Report	Boyce 4'; Fraser (yellow card) 33'; Woods (yellow card) 54'; Gardyne (yellow card) 65'; O'Brien (yellow card) 69'; Curran (yellow card) 76'; Tumilty (yellow card) 90+4'	Attendance: 6,812; Referee: Nick Walsh

16 May 2017 37	Ross County	3–2	Hamilton Academical	Victoria Park
19:45	Gardyne 3'; Matthews 31' (o.g.); O'Brien (yellow card) 89'; Franks 90+1'; Boyce (yellow card) 90+3'	BBC Report	Bingham 26'; Longridge (yellow card) 8'; MacKinnon (yellow card) 13'; Templeton 75'; Imrie (yellow card) 90'; Skondras (yellow card) 90+3'	Attendance: 4,871; Referee: Alan Muir

20 May 2017 38	Kilmarnock	1–2	Ross County	Rugby Park
15:00	Sammon 10' (pen.); Smith (yellow card) 41'; Dicker (yellow card) 67'	BBC Report	Boyce 21', 34'	Attendance: 3,951; Referee: Madden

=== League Cup ===
16 July 2016 Group D	Montrose	0–1	Ross County	Links Park
15:00		SPFL Report	Graham 86' (pen.)	Attendance: 557; Referee: Charleston

23 July 2016 Group D	Ross County	1–1 (3–4 p)	Raith Rovers	Victoria Park
15:00	Graham 75' (pen.)	SPFL Report	Čikoš 18' (o.g.)	Attendance: 1,173; Referee: McKendrick
	Penalties
	Schalk (penalty scored) Graham (penalty scored) Gardyne (penalty missed) Routis (penalty scored) McEveley (penalty missed) McShane (penalty missed)		Benedictus (penalty scored) Stewart (penalty scored) Callachan (penalty missed) Thomson (penalty missed) McManus (penalty scored) McHattie (penalty scored)

26 July 2016 Group D	Alloa Athletic	3–2	Ross County	Recreation Park
19:30	Kirkpatrick 2'; Robertson 11'; Waters 72'	SPFL report	Graham 14'; Schalk 21'	Attendance: 319; Referee: Finnie

30 July 2016 Group D	Ross County	7–0	Cove Rangers	Victoria Park
15:00	Schalk 24', 49'; Graham 46', 56', 89'; Curran 65', 81'	SPFL Report		Attendance: 722; Referee: Mat Northcroft

=== Scottish Cup ===
21 January 2017 Fourth round	Ross County	6–2	Dundee United	Victoria Park
15:00	Routis 6' 76'; Quinn 16'; Chow 28'; Boyce 30'; O'Brien 90+2'	Report	Andreu 13' (yellow card) 35' (goal) 45+2'; Telfer (yellow card) 15'; Fraser (yellow card) 39'	Attendance: 2,440; Referee: Kevin Clancy

11 February 2017 Fifth round	Ross County	0–1	Aberdeen	Victoria Park
15:00		Report	Logan 87'	Attendance: 4,671; Referee: Madden

== Squad statistics ==
=== Appearances ===
No.	Pos	Nat	Player	Total		Premiership		League Cup		Scottish Cup	
No.	Pos	Nat	Player	Apps	Goals	Apps	Goals	Apps	Goals	Apps	Goals
1	GK	(Scotland) SCO	Scott Fox	40	0	35	0	3	0	2	0
2	DF	(Scotland) SCO	Marcus Fraser	35	0	33	0	0	0	2	0
3	DF	(Scotland) SCO	Jason Naismith	16	0	14+2	0	0	0	0	0
4	DF	(France) FRA	Christopher Routis	34	5	23+7	3	2+1	0	1	2
5	DF	(Scotland) SCO	Jay McEveley	29	3	20+3	3	4	0	2	0
6	MF	(Republic of Ireland) IRL	Jim O'Brien	18	1	8+8	0	0	0	1+1	1
7	FW	(Scotland) SCO	Michael Gardyne	38	2	28+5	2	4	0	1	0
8	MF	(Scotland) SCO	Martin Woods	35	1	27+2	1	4	0	2	0
9	FW	(Scotland) SCO	Ryan Dow	24	1	13+10	1	0	0	1	0
10	FW	(Northern Ireland) NIR	Liam Boyce	41	24	35	23	4	0	2	1
11	FW	(England) ENG	Craig Curran	38	7	25+8	5	1+3	2	0+1	0
12	MF	(Chinese Taipei) TPE	Tim Chow	32	2	26+4	1	0	0	2	1
15	DF	(England) ENG	Andrew Davies	34	1	31	1	2	0	1	0
16	MF	(Scotland) SCO	Tony Dingwall	17	0	4+11	0	0+2	0	0	0
17	FW	(England) ENG	Jonathan Franks	19	1	9+8	1	1+1	0	0	0
18	MF	(Scotland) SCO	Ian McShane	10	0	5+2	0	2+1	0	0	0
19	MF	(England) ENG	Oscar Gobern	1	0	0	0	0	0	0+1	0
22	MF	(Scotland) SCO	Chris Burke	6	1	4+2	1	0	0	0	0
23	FW	(Netherlands) NED	Alex Schalk	38	8	15+17	5	3+1	3	2	0
27	FW	(Slovakia) SVK	Milan Lalkovic	8	0	2+4	0	0	0	0+2	0
28	DF	(Netherlands) NED	Kenny van der Weg	38	0	29+4	0	3	0	2	0
31	GK	(Republic of Ireland) IRL	Aaron McCarey	5	0	3+1	0	1	0	0	0
41	GK	(England) ENG	Mark Foden	0	0	0	0	0	0	0	0
43	DF	(Scotland) SCO	Paul Quinn	19	1	16	0	2	0	1	1
50	MF	(England) ENG	Davis Keillor-Dunn	0	0	0	0	0	0	0	0
52	DF	(Scotland) SCO	Reghan Tumilty	9	0	2+6	0	0	0	0+1	0
53	FW	(Scotland) SCO	Greg Morrison	5	0	1+4	0	0	0	0	0
57	MF	(Scotland) SCO	Blair Malcolm	1	0	1	0	0	0	0	0
58	FW	(Scotland) SCO	Russell Dingwall	1	0	0+1	0	0	0	0	0
63	MF	(Scotland) SCO	Dylan Dykes	2	0	0+2	0	0	0	0	0
Players who left the club during the 2016–17 season
3	DF	(Slovakia) SVK	Erik Čikoš (contract terminated by mutual consent)	7	0	5	0	2	0	0	0
6	DF	(Scotland) SCO	Chris Robertson (contract terminated)	3	0	0	0	2+1	0	0	0
12	DF	(Scotland) SCO	Richard Foster (joined St Johnstone)	3	0	1	0	2	0	0	0
19	FW	(Scotland) SCO	Brian Graham (joined Hibernian)	5	6	1	0	2+2	6	0	0
20	DF	(Scotland) SCO	Scott Boyd (joined Kilmarnock)	0	0	0	0	0	0	0	0
44	DF	(Scotland) SCO	Christopher McLaughlin (loaned to Forfar Athletic)	1	0	0+1	0	0	0	0	0

=== Goalscorers ===
Ranking	Nation	Number	Name	Scottish Premiership	League Cup	Scottish Cup	Total
1	(Northern Ireland)	10	Liam Boyce	23	0	1	24
2	(Netherlands)	23	Alex Schalk	5	3	0	8
3	(England)	11	Craig Curran	5	2	0	7
4	(Scotland)	19	Brian Graham	0	6	0	6
5	(France)	4	Christopher Routis	3	0	2	5
6	(Scotland)	5	Jay McEveley	3	0	0	3
7	(Scotland)	7	Michael Gardyne	2	0	0	2
=	(Chinese Taipei)	12	Tim Chow	1	0	1	2
9	(Republic of Ireland)	6	Jim O'Brien	0	0	1	1
=	(Scotland)	8	Martin Woods	1	0	0	1
=	(Scotland)	9	Ryan Dow	1	0	0	1
=	(England)	15	Andrew Davies	1	0	0	1
=	(England)	17	Jonathan Franks	1	0	0	1
=	(Scotland)	22	Chris Burke	1	0	0	1
=	(Scotland)	43	Paul Quinn	0	0	1	1
			Own goal	1	0	0	1
TOTALS				48	11	6	65

=== Disciplinary record ===
Number	Nation	Position	Name	Premiership		League Cup		Scottish Cup		Total	
Number	Nation	Position	Name	Booked	Sent off (straight red)	Booked	Sent off (straight red)	Booked	Sent off (straight red)	Booked	Sent off (straight red)
1	(Scotland)	GK	Scott Fox	1	0	0	0	0	0	1	0
2	(Scotland)	DF	Marcus Fraser	4	0	0	0	1	0	5	0
3	(Scotland)	DF	Jason Naismith	1	0	0	0	0	0	1	0
4	(France)	DF	Christopher Routis	6	0	0	0	0	0	6	0
5	(Scotland)	DF	Jay McEveley	9	1	1	0	0	0	10	1
6	(Republic of Ireland)	MF	Jim O'Brien	6	1	0	0	0	0	6	1
7	(Scotland)	FW	Michael Gardyne	4	0	1	0	0	0	5	0
8	(Scotland)	MF	Martin Woods	6	0	0	0	0	0	6	0
9	(Scotland)	FW	Ryan Dow	4	0	0	0	0	0	4	0
10	(Northern Ireland)	FW	Liam Boyce	7	0	1	0	1	0	9	0
11	(England)	FW	Craig Curran	6	0	0	0	0	0	6	0
12	(Chinese Taipei)	DF	Tim Chow	8	1	0	0	1	0	9	1
12	(Scotland)	DF	Richard Foster	1	0	2	0	0	0	3	0
15	(England)	DF	Andrew Davies	7	0	0	0	1	0	8	0
16	(Scotland)	MF	Tony Dingwall	2	0	0	0	0	0	2	0
18	(Scotland)	MF	Ian McShane	0	1	1	0	0	0	1	1
19	(Scotland)	FW	Brian Graham	0	0	1	0	0	0	1	0
22	(Scotland)	MF	Chris Burke	1	0	0	0	0	0	1	0
23	(Netherlands)	FW	Alex Schalk	1	0	0	0	0	0	1	0
23	(Slovakia)	FW	Milan Lalkovic	1	0	0	0	0	0	1	0
28	(Netherlands)	DF	Kenny van der Weg	4	1	0	0	0	0	4	1
43	(Scotland)	DF	Paul Quinn	3	0	1	0	0	0	4	0
52	(Scotland)	DF	Reghan Tumilty	1	0	0	0	0	0	1	0
			TOTALS	83	5	8	0	4	0	95	5

== Team statistics ==
=== League table ===
Pos	Team	Pld	W	D	L	GF	GA	GD	Pts	Qualification or relegation (Note: Teams played each other three times (33 matches), before the league split into two groups (the top six and the bottom six) for the last five matches.)
5	Heart of Midlothian	38	12	10	16	55	52	+3	46	
6	Partick Thistle	38	10	12	16	38	54	−16	42	
7	Ross County	38	11	13	14	48	58	−10	46	
8	Kilmarnock	38	9	14	15	36	56	−20	41	
9	Motherwell	38	10	8	20	46	69	−23	38	

Source: Scottish Premiership, Soccerway
Rules for classification: 1) Points; 2) Goal difference; 3) Goals scored; 4) Play-off (only if deciding champion, UEFA competitions qualification and second stage group allocation).

== Transfers ==
=== In ===
Date	Player	From	Fee
25 May 2016	(Slovakia) Erik Čikoš	(Slovakia) Slovan Bratislava	Free
25 May 2016	(Republic of Ireland) Aaron McCarey	(England) Wolverhampton Wanderers	Free
25 May 2016	(France) Christopher Routis	(England) Bradford City	Free
25 May 2016	(Netherlands) Kenny van der Weg	(Netherlands) NAC Breda	Free
24 June 2016	(England) Jay McEveley	(England) Sheffield United	Free
25 August 2016	(Chinese Taipei) Tim Chow	(England) Wigan Athletic	Free
9 September 2016	(Scotland) Ryan Dow	(Scotland) Dundee United	Free
27 September 2016	(Scotland) Chris Burke	(England) Nottingham Forest	Free
18 January 2017	(Scotland) Jason Naismith	(Scotland) St. Mirren	Undisclosed
18 January 2017	(Republic of Ireland) Jim O'Brien	(England) Shrewsbury Town	Loan
20 January 2017	(England) Oscar Gobern	(England) Mansfield Town	Free
20 January 2017	(Slovakia) Milan Lalkovic	(England) Portsmouth	Loan

=== Out ===
Date	Player	To	Fee
14 June 2016	(Scotland) Stewart Murdoch	(Scotland) Dundee United	Free
15 July 2016	(Australia) Jackson Irvine	(England) Burton Albion	£300,000
19 August 2016	(Scotland) Richard Foster	(Scotland) St Johnstone	Free
21 August 2016	(Scotland) Brian Graham	(Scotland) Hibernian	Free
31 August 2016	(Scotland) Scott Boyd	(Scotland) Kilmarnock	Loan
2 September 2016	(Scotland) Chris Robertson	(England) AFC Wimbledon	Free
17 January 2017	(Slovakia) Erik Čikoš	(Italy) Monopoli	Free
30 January 2017	(Scotland) Christopher McLaughlin	(Scotland) Forfar Athletic	Loan
31 January 2017	(Scotland) Scott Boyd	(Scotland) Kilmarnock	Free

== See also ==
- List of Ross County F.C. seasons
