= 2017–18 Ross County F.C. season =

Ross County
2017–18 season
- Chairman: Roy MacGregor
- Manager: Jim McIntyre (until 25 September); Owen Coyle (from 28 September - 1 March); Steven Ferguson and Stuart Kettlewell
- Ground: Victoria Park
- Scottish Premiership: Twelfth Place
- Scottish League Cup: Second Round
- Scottish Cup: Fourth Round
- Top goalscorer: League: Schalk (11); All: Schalk (13)
- Highest home attendance: 6,590 vs Celtic; Premiership; 18 November 2017
- Lowest home attendance: 1,108 vs Alloa Athletic; League Cup; 15 July 2017
- Average home league attendance: 4,612
Home colours	Away colours

The 2017–18 season was the club's 5th season in the Scottish Premiership and their sixth consecutive appearance in the top flight of Scottish football. Ross County also competed in the League Cup and the Scottish Cup.

On 25 September, manager Jim McIntyre was sacked by the club. On 28 September, Owen Coyle took over as manager. He resigned on 1 March with Steven Ferguson and Stuart Kettlewell taking over as co-managers but they could not keep County in the Premiership and on 12 May after 6 years they were relegated back to the Championship.

== Results & fixtures ==
Win Draw Loss Postponed

=== Pre-season ===
1 July 2017 Friendly	Elgin City	0–1	Ross County	Borough Briggs
15:00		Report	Herron 72'

6 July 2017 Friendly	Valenciennes	2–1	Ross County	Pinatar Arena, Spain
19:00	Mothiba 38'; Ndao 65'	Report	Schalk 35'

=== Scottish Premiership ===
5 August 2017 1	Dundee	1–2	Ross County	Dens Park
15:00	Hendry 86'; Holt (yellow card) 78'	BBC Report	Chow (yellow card) 29'; Lindsay 35'; Routis 61'; Gardyne (yellow card) 71'	Attendance: 5,032; Referee: Willie Collum

12 August 2017 2	Ross County	1–2	Aberdeen	Global Energy Stadium
15:00	Curran 2'; Routis (yellow card) 39'; O'Brien (yellow card) 57'; Keillor-Dunn (yellow card) 82'	BBC Report	Reynolds 23'; Logan 71'; Shinnie (yellow card) 72'	Attendance: 5,965; Referee: Don Robertson

19 August 2017 3	Motherwell	2–0	Ross County	Dens Park
15:00	Heneghan (yellow card) 3'; Rose (yellow card) 27'; Tait 53'; Moult 74' (pen.)	BBC Report	Chow (yellow card) 17'; Fraser (yellow card) 46' van der Weg (red card) 74'	Attendance: 3,911; Referee: Alan Muir

27 August 2017 4	Ross County	1–3	Rangers	Global Energy Stadium
15:00 BST	Davies (yellow card) 45'; Mikkelsen 59'; Gardyne (yellow card) 71'	BBC Report	Morelos 31', 41'; Herrera 89'	Attendance: 6,400; Referee: Craig Thomson

9 September 2017 5	Ross County	1–1	Partick Thistle	Global Energy Stadium
15:00 BST	Kelly (yellow card) 58'; Routis (yellow card) 61'; Davies (yellow card) 45'; Schalk 86' (pen.)	BBC Report	Devine (yellow card) 7'; Spittal 22'	Attendance: 3,660; Referee: John Beaton

16 September 2017 6	Celtic	4–0	Ross County	Celtic Park
15:00 BST	Rogic 13'; Dembélé 42'; Forrest 52', 74'	BBC Report	O'Brien (yellow card) 47'	Attendance: 58,624; Referee: Steven McLean

23 September 2017 7	Ross County	0–1	Hibernian	Global Energy Stadium
15:00 BST	Draper (yellow card) 56'; O'Brien (yellow card) 67'	BBC Report	Hanlon 13'; Bartley (yellow card) 57'	Attendance: 4,181; Referee: Andrew Dallas

30 September 2017 8	Kilmarnock	0–2	Ross County	Rugby Park
15:00 BST		BBC Report	Curran 34' van der Weg 44'	Attendance: 3,337; Referee: Craig Thomson

14 October 2017 9	Ross County	1–2	Heart of Midlothian	Global Energy Stadium
15:00 BST	Keillor-Dunn 36'	BBC Report	Gonçalves 34'; Walker 59'; Randall (yellow card) 65' (yellow-red card)	Attendance: 4,819; Referee: William Collum

21 October 2017 10	Ross County	2–1	Hamilton Academical	Global Energy Stadium
15:00 BST	Davies (yellow card) 21'; Schalk 70'; O'Brien (yellow card) 82'; Mikkelsen 90+2'	BBC Report	Docherty 52'; Boyd (yellow card) 67'; Longridge (yellow card) 89'	Attendance: 3,509; Referee: Stephen Finnie

24 October 2017 11	St Johnstone	0–0	Ross County	McDiarmid Park
19:45 BST		BBC Report	Fraser (yellow card) 59'; Chow (yellow card) 68'; O'Brien (yellow card) 90'; McCarey (yellow card) 90+2'	Attendance: 2,267; Referee: Barry Cook

28 October 2017 12	Aberdeen	2–1	Ross County	Pittodrie Stadium
15:00 BST	Christie 12' (yellow card) 88'; McLean 52' (pen.) (yellow card) 90+2'; McKenna (yellow card) 75'	BBC Report	Gardyne 8' (yellow card) 90+1'; Lindsay (yellow card) 52'; Draper (yellow card) 84'	Attendance: 13,918; Referee: Don Robertson

4 November 2017 13	Ross County	3–2	Motherwell	Global Energy Stadium
15:00 GMT	Gardyne 13', 42'; Keillor-Dunn 26'; Draper (yellow card) 84'	BBC Report	Bowman 48'; Hartley (yellow card) 52'; Moult 79'	Attendance: 4,014; Referee: Euan Anderson

18 November 2017 14	Ross County	0–1	Celtic	Global Energy Stadium
12:30 GMT	Gardyne (yellow card) 42'; O'Brien (yellow card) 77'; Kelly (yellow card) 88'	BBC Report	Boyata (yellow card) 45+1'; Tierney (yellow card) 66'; Griffiths 78'	Attendance: 6,590; Referee: Nick Walsh

25 November 2017 15	Heart of Midlothian	0–0	Ross County	Tynecastle Stadium
15:00 GMT	Walker (yellow card) 45+1'; Stockton (yellow card) 73'	BBC Report	O'Brien (yellow card) 56'; Draper (yellow card) 88'	Attendance: 15,601; Referee: John Beaton

2 December 2017 16	Ross County	0–2	Dundee	Global Energy Stadium
15:00 GMT	Draper (yellow card) 78'	BBC Report	O'Hara 18'; El Bakhtaoui 89'	Attendance: 3,896; Referee: Steven McLean

9 December 2017 17	Rangers	2–1	Ross County	Ibrox Stadium
15:00 GMT	Morelos 59'; Wilson 83'	BBC Report	Curran 10'; Keillor-Dunn (yellow card) 71'	Attendance: 48,139; Referee: Euan Anderson

13 December 2017 18	Ross County	2–2	Kilmarnock	Global Energy Stadium
19:45 GMT	Routis 31'; Naismith 41'	BBC Report	Power (yellow card) 34'; Brophy 61'; Boyd (yellow card) 54' (goal) 86'; Mulumbu (yellow card) 90'	Attendance: 3,021; Referee: Andrew Dallas

16 December 2017 19	Hamilton Academical	3–2	Ross County	SuperSeal Stadium
15:00 GMT	Imrie 30' (pen.); Sarris 75'; Lindsay 89' (OG.); Skondras (red card) 90+2'	BBC Report	Curran 73'; Van Der Weg 84'; Gardyne (yellow card) 86' (yellow-red card)	Attendance: 1,272; Referee: Gavin Duncan

23 December 2017 20	Hibernian	2–1	Ross County	Easter Road
15:00 GMT	Stokes 21'; Shaw 75'	BBC Report	Curran 14'	Attendance: 16,228; Referee: Nick Walsh

27 December 2017 21	Ross County	1–1	St Johnstone	Global Energy Stadium
19:45 GMT	Schalk 54' (pen.)	BBC Report	Johnstone 2'	Attendance: 3,636; Referee: Greg Aitken

30 December 2017 22	Partick Thistle	2–0	Ross County	Firhill Stadium
15:00 GMT		BBC Report	Doolan 35'; Sammon 86'	Attendance: 2,870; Referee: Stephen Finnie

24 January 2018 23	Motherwell	2–0	Ross County	Fir Park
19:45 GMT	Souttar 45' (o.g.); Main 47'; Kipré (yellow card) 79'; Ross MacLean (yellow card) 81'		Routis (yellow card) 60'	Attendance: 3,196; Referee: Kevin Clancy

28 January 2018 24	Ross County	1–2	Rangers	Global Energy Stadium
14:00 GMT	Naismith (yellow card) 25'; Chow (yellow card) 50'; Ngog 90'		Candeias 21'; Cummings 82'	Attendance: 6,541; Referee: Steven Maclean

31 January 2018 25	Ross County	2–4	Aberdeen	Global Energy Stadium
19:45	Schalk 77', 82'		McLean 28', 64'; Rooney 32' (pen.), 34'	Attendance: 4,318; Referee: Andrew Dallas

3 February 2018 26	Dundee	1–4	Ross County	Dens Park
15:00	Waddell 57'		Keillor-Dunn 49'; Schalk 61', 64'; Souttar (yellow card) 89'; Tim Chow 90'	Attendance: 4,971; Referee: John Beaton

17 February 2018 27	Ross County	1–1	Heart of Midlothian	Global Energy Stadium
12:30	Fontaine (yellow card) 53'; Naismith 76'; Tansey (yellow card) 89'		Lafferty 53'; Adao (yellow card) 87'	Attendance: 4,936; Referee: Craig Thompson

24 February 2018 28	St Johnstone	2–0	Ross County	McDiarmid Park
15:00 BST	Davidson 29', 40' (yellow card) 33'; Kane (yellow card) 59'; MacLean (yellow card) 86'		Curran (red card) 85'	Attendance: 2,533; Referee: Willie Collum

10 March 2018 29	Kilmarnock	3–2	Ross County	Rugby Park
15:00 BST	Erwin 16'; Broadfoot (yellow card) 33'; Boyd 46'; Brophy 74'		Naismith (yellow card) 53'; O'Brien (yellow card) 72'; Mckay 86'; Schalk 90+1'	Attendance: 4,001; Referee: John Beaton

17 March 2018 30	Ross County	2–2	Hamilton Academical	Global Energy Stadium
15:00	Lindsay 23'; Davies 76'		Imrie 49'; Ogkmpoe 52'	Attendance: 3,586; Referee: Kevin Clancy

31 March 2018 31	Celtic	3–0	Ross County	Celtic Park
15:00 BST	Dembélé 25'; Armstrong 48'; Rogic 60'		Davies (red card) 39'	Attendance: 58,765; Referee: Steven McLean

3 April 2018 32	Ross County	4–0	Partick Thistle	Global Energy Stadium
19:45 BST	Lindsay (yellow card) 14'; Schalk 35' 56' 72'; Draper 41'	Report	Keown (yellow card) 65'	Attendance: 3,944; Referee: (Scotland) Willie Collum

7 April 2018 33	Ross County	1–1	Hibernian	Global Energy Stadium
15:00 BST	Mckay 28'; Draper (yellow card) 43'; Routis (yellow card) 44'	Report	Shaw 90'	Attendance: 5,389; Referee: (Scotland) Bobby Madden

21 April 2018 34	Ross County	0–0	Motherwell	Global Energy Stadium
15:00 BST	Lindsay (yellow card) 45+1'; Schalk (yellow card) 53'; Fontaine (yellow card) 90+1'	Report	Kipré (yellow card) 54'	Attendance: 3,879; Referee: (Scotland) Alan Muir

28 April 2018 35	Hamilton Academical	2–0	Ross County	SuperSeal Stadium
12:30 BST	MacKinnon (yellow card) 1'; Imrie 56' (pen.); Templeton 67'; Sarris (yellow card) 90+2'		Fraser (yellow card) 21'	Attendance: 2,057; Referee: Bobby Madden

4 May 2018 36	Partick Thistle	1–1	Ross County	Firhill Stadium
19:45 BST	Erskine 21'	BBC Report	Mckay 42'	Attendance: 4,312; Referee: Kevin Clancy

8 May 2018 37	Ross County	0–1	Dundee	Global Energy Stadium
19:45 BST		BBC Report	Murray 51'	Attendance: Andrew Dallas; Referee: 3,976

12 May 2018 38	St Johnstone	1–1	Ross County	McDiarmid Park
15:00 BST	Wotherspoon 90+2'	BBC Report	Curran 3'	Attendance: Nick Walsh; Referee: 3,279

=== Scottish League Cup ===
==== Matches ====
15 July 2017 Group D	Ross County	2–0	Alloa	Global Energy Stadium
15:00	Fraser 40'; Curran 69'	BBC Report		Attendance: 1,108; Referee: John McKendrick

18 July 2017 Group D	Montrose	0–6	Ross County	Links Park
19:45	Hay (yellow card) 81'; Watson (yellow card) 90'	BBC Report	Mikkelsen 15', 54'; Gardyne 31'; Curran 27' (pen.), 45'; Schalk 58'	Attendance: 421; Referee: Alan Newlands

21 July 2017 Group D	Ross County	0–0 (4–3 p)	Hibernian	Global Energy Stadium
19:45		BBC Report; SPFL Report		Attendance: 2,065; Referee: Steven McLean
	Penalties
	Routis (penalty missed); O'Brien (penalty scored); Schalk (penalty scored); Fraser (penalty scored); Gardyne (penalty scored)		(penalty missed) Whittaker; (penalty scored) McGinn; (penalty scored) Boyle; (penalty scored) Murray; (penalty missed) Shaw

29 July 2017 Group D	Arbroath	0–0 (4–5 p)	Ross County	Gayfield Park
15:00		BBC Report; SPFL Report		Attendance: 702; Referee: Steven Kirkland
	Penalties
	(penalty scored) Henry; (penalty scored) Linn; (penalty scored) McCord; (penalty scored) Yule; (penalty missed) Little; (penalty missed) Gold		Fraser (penalty scored); Routis (penalty scored); Schalk (penalty scored); Kelly (penalty scored); Mikkelsen (penalty missed); Chow (penalty scored)

==== League Cup Group D Table ====
Pos	Team	Pld	W	PW	PL	L	GF	GA	GD	Pts	Qualification	HIB	ROS	ARB	MON	ALO
1	Hibernian (Q)	4	3	0	1	0	13	1	+12	10	Qualification for the Second Round	—	—	6–1	4–0	—
2	Ross County (Q)	4	2	2	0	0	8	0	+8	10	Qualification for the Second Round	p0–0	—	—	—	2–0
3	Arbroath	4	1	1	1	1	6	7	−1	6		—	0–0p	—	4–0	—
4	Montrose	4	1	0	0	3	2	15	−13	3		—	0–6	—	—	2–1
5	Alloa Athletic	4	0	0	1	3	2	8	−6	1		0–3	—	1–1p	—	—

Rules for classification: 1) goal difference, 2) goals scored, 3) away goals scored, 4) matches won, 5) away matches won, 6) drawing of lots.
(Q) Qualified to the phase indicated

==== Knockout stage ====
9 August 2017 Second Round	Ross County	2–3 (a.e.t.)	Motherwell	Global Energy Stadium
19:45 BST	Schalk 65'; Dow (yellow card) 69'; Curran 104' (pen.)	BBC Report	Bigirimana 50'; Moult (yellow card) 77'; MacLean (yellow card) 90+3' (goal) 112'; Cadden 92'; Dunne (red card) 104'	Attendance: 1,612; Referee: Stephen Finnie

=== Scottish Cup ===
20 January 2017 Fourth Round	Kilmarnock	1–0	Ross County	Rugby Park
15:00 GMT	Boyd (yellow card) 45+3'; Erwin 88' (pen.)	BBC Report	Draper (yellow card) 39'; Chow (red card) 88'	Attendance: 3,595; Referee: Bobby Madden

== Squad statistics ==
=== Appearances ===
As of 12 May 2018

No.	Pos	Nat	Player	Total		Premiership		League Cup		Scottish Cup	
No.	Pos	Nat	Player	Apps	Goals	Apps	Goals	Apps	Goals	Apps	Goals
1	GK	(Scotland) SCO	Scott Fox	31	0	26+1	0	4	0	0	0
2	DF	(Scotland) SCO	Marcus Fraser	43	1	38	0	4+1	1	0	0
3	DF	(Scotland) SCO	Jason Naismith	41	2	34+1	2	5	0	1	0
4	DF	(France) FRA	Christopher Routis	30	2	21+3	2	1+4	0	1	0
5	DF	(Scotland) SCO	Harry Souttar	13	0	11+2	0	0	0	0	0
6	DF	(Scotland) SCO	Sean Kelly	18	0	11+2	0	5	0	0	0
7	FW	(Scotland) SCO	Michael Gardyne	39	4	27+6	3	5	1	1	0
8	MF	(Chinese Taipei) TPE	Tim Chow	20	1	10+4	1	5	0	0+1	0
9	FW	(Scotland) SCO	Ryan Dow	23	0	4+14	0	5	0	0	0
10	FW	(Netherlands) NED	Alex Schalk	37	13	20+11	11	4+1	2	0+1	0
11	FW	(England) ENG	Craig Curran	40	10	20+15	6	4+1	4	0	0
14	FW	(France) FRA	David Ngog	10	1	4+6	1	0	0	0	0
15	DF	(England) ENG	Andrew Davies (c)	30	1	24	1	5	0	1	0
17	MF	(England) ENG	Ross Draper	29	1	25+3	1	0	0	1	0
18	MF	(Scotland) SCO	Jamie Lindsay	32	2	21+5	2	4+1	0	1	0
22	FW	(Northern Ireland) NIR	Billy Mckay	24	3	14+9	3	0	0	1	0
23	MF	(England) ENG	Greg Tansey	3	0	2+1	0	0	0	0	0
24	MF	(Scotland) SCO	Tony Dingwall	0	0	0	0	0	0	0	0
25	MF	(Scotland) SCO	Jim O'Brien	31	0	24+3	0	1+2	0	1	0
31	GK	(Republic of Ireland) IRL	Aaron McCarey	16	0	12+2	0	1	0	1	0
32	DF	(England) ENG	Liam Fontaine	14	0	14	0	0	0	0	0
35	DF	(England) ENG	Max Melbourne	6	0	6	0	0	0	0	0
40	MF	(England) ENG	Davis Keillor-Dunn	30	3	18+11	3	0+1	0	0	0
41	GK	(England) ENG	Mark Foden	0	0	0	0	0	0	0	0
43	FW	(Scotland) SCO	Greg Morrison	1	0	0	0	0+1	0	0	0
47	MF	(Estonia) EST	Mattias Käit	6	0	3+3	0	0	0	0	0
51	GK	(Scotland) SCO	Ross Munro	0	0	0	0	0	0	0	0
Players who left the club during the 2017–18 season
12	FW	(England) ENG	Inih Effiong (Released from contract)	3	0	2	0	0	0	1	0
16	MF	(Scotland) SCO	Dylan Dykes (loaned to Stranraer)	0	0	0	0	0	0	0	0
19	FW	(Denmark) DEN	Thomas Mikkelsen (loaned to Dundee United)	14	4	2+7	2	1+4	2	0	0
28	DF	(Netherlands) NED	Kenny van der Weg (Joined Hamilton Academical)	21	2	16+3	2	1	0	1	0
33	MF	(England) ENG	Chris Eagles (Released from contract)	9	0	7+1	0	0	0	0+1	0
42	DF	(Scotland) SCO	Reghan Tumilty (loaned to Falkirk)	2	0	1+1	0	0	0	0	0
44	FW	(Scotland) SCO	Russell Dingwall (loaned to Forfar Athletic)	0	0	0	0	0	0	0	0
45	MF	(Scotland) SCO	Blair Malcolm (loaned to Cowdenbeath)	0	0	0	0	0	0	0	0

== Team statistics ==
=== League table ===
Pos	Team	Pld	W	D	L	GF	GA	GD	Pts	Qualification or relegation (Note: Teams play each other three times (33 matches) before the league is split into two groups (the top six and the bottom six).)
8	St Johnstone	38	12	10	16	42	53	−11	46	
9	Dundee	38	11	6	21	36	57	−21	39	
10	Hamilton Academical	38	9	6	23	47	68	−21	33	
11	Partick Thistle (R)	38	8	9	21	31	61	−30	33	Qualification for the Premiership play-off final
12	Ross County (R)	38	6	11	21	40	62	−22	29	Relegation to the Championship

Source: Soccerway BBC
Rules for classification: 1) Points; 2) Goal difference; 3) Goals scored; 4) Play-off (only if deciding champion, UEFA competitions qualification and second-stage group allocation).
(R) Relegated

== Transfers ==
=== In ===
Date	Player	From	Fee
11 June 2017	(Scotland) Sean Kelly	(England) AFC Wimbledon	Free
3 July 2017	(Scotland) Jamie Lindsay	(Scotland) Celtic	Loan
4 July 2017	(Denmark) Thomas Mikkelsen	(Denmark) Odense Boldklub	Undisclosed
20 July 2017	(Scotland) Jim O'Brien	(England) Shrewsbury Town	Free
25 July 2017	(Northern Ireland) Billy Mckay	(England) Wigan Athletic	Free
9 August 2017	(England) Ross Draper	(Scotland) Inverness Caledonian Thistle	£100,000
23 November 2017	(England) Chris Eagles	(England) Port Vale	Free
9 January 2018	(England) Greg Tansey	(Scotland) Aberdeen	Loan
19 January 2018	(England) Inih Effiong	(England) Woking	Undisclosed
23 January 2018	(France) David Ngog	(Greece) Panionios	Free
24 January 2018	(Scotland) Harry Souttar	(England) Stoke City	Loan
31 January 2018	(England) Liam Fontaine	(Scotland) Hibernian	Free
31 January 2018	(England) Max Melbourne	(England) West Brom	Loan
31 January 2018	(Estonia) Mattias Kait	(England) Fulham	Loan

=== Out ===
Date	Player	To	Fee
20 June 2017	(Northern Ireland) Liam Boyce	(England) Burton Albion	Undisclosed
13 July 2017	(Scotland) Ian McShane	(Scotland) St Mirren	Free
15 July 2017	(Scotland) Christopher McLaughlin	(Scotland) Dumbarton	Free
15 July 2017	(England) Mark Foden	(Scotland) Stirling Albion	Loan
18 July 2017	(Scotland) Chris Burke	(Scotland) Kilmrnock	Free
22 July 2017	(Scotland) David Brownlie	(Scotland) Airdrieonians	Free
27 July 2017	(Scotland) Jay McEveley	(England) Tranmere Rovers	Free
12 August 2017	(Scotland) Paul Quinn	(Scotland) Dundee United	Free
17 August 2017	(England) Jonathan Franks	(England) Hartlepool United	Free
30 August 2017	(Scotland) Greg Morrison	(Scotland) Dumbarton	Loan
17 November 2017	(Scotland) Blair Malcolm	(Scotland) Cowdenbeath	Loan
23 November 2017	(Scotland) Reghan Tumilty	(Scotland) Falkirk	Loan
1 December 2017	(England) Oscar Gobern	(England) Yeovil Town	Free
12 January 2018	(Scotland) Dylan Dykes	(Scotland) Stranraer	Loan
19 January 2018	(Denmark) Thomas Mikkelsen	(Scotland) Dundee United	Loan
26 January 2018	(Scotland) Russell Dingwall	(Scotland) Forfar Athletic	Loan
26 January 2018	(Scotland) Ross Maciver	(Scotland) Forfar Athletic	Loan
31 January 2018	(Netherlands) Kenny van der Weg	(Scotland) Hamilton Academical	Free
4 April 2018	(England) Chris Eagles	Free agent	Mutual consent

== See also ==
- List of Ross County F.C. seasons
