= Dylan Dykes =

Scottish footballer

Personal information
- Date of birth: 14 March 1996 (age 30)
- Place of birth: Crookston, Scotland
- Height: 1.86 m (6 ft 1 in)
- Position: Midfielder

Team information
- Current team: Cumnock Juniors

Youth career
- 2013–2016: Rangers

Senior career*
Years	Team	Apps	(Gls)
2016–2019	Ross County	2	(0)
2018	→ Stranraer (loan)	14	(0)
2019–2020	Greenock Morton	7	(0)
2019–2020	→ Stenhousemuir (loan)	12	(1)
2020	Cumbernauld Colts	1	(0)
2020–2022	St Cadoc's		
2022–2023	Pollok	7	(2)
2023	St Cadoc's		
2023–2024	Arthurlie		
2024–	Cumnock Juniors		

International career^{‡}
2014	Scotland U19	2	(0)
- * Club domestic league appearances and goals as of 00:30, 1 July 2020 (UTC) ‡ National team caps and goals as of 00:30, 1 July 2020 (UTC)

Dylan Dykes (born 14 March 1996) is a Scottish footballer who plays for Lowland League West team Cumnock Juniors.

== Career ==
Dykes played youth football with Rangers, signing a contract until the summer of 2016. He was released upon the expiration of his contract in May that year.

Dykes then signed for fellow Scottish Premiership side Ross County on 22 July 2016. He made his professional debut in a Highland derby against Inverness CT on 28 April 2017.

Having had limited first team opportunities at Ross County, Dykes joined League One club Stranraer in January 2018 on a development loan for the rest of the 2017–18 season.

Dykes left Ross County in January 2019 and signed for Greenock Morton. Dykes joined Stenhousemuir on loan before joining Cumbernauld Colts in February 2020.

Dykes agreed a move to West of Scotland team St Cadoc's in May 2020 before moving to Pollok two years later. He made his debut at home to Hurlford United in March, and scored his first goal from the penalty spot against Troon F.C. in a 2-1 win in April.

In October 2022, Pollok announced that Dykes had undergone treatment following a cancer diagnosis, triggering a wave of support from his former clubs and the wider footballing world.

== Career statistics ==
As of 21 July 2019

Appearances and goals by club, season and competition
Club	Season	League			Scottish Cup		League Cup		Other		Total	
Club	Season	Division	Apps	Goals	Apps	Goals	Apps	Goals	Apps	Goals	Apps	Goals
Ross County	2016–17	Scottish Premiership	2	0	0	0	0	0	—		2	0
Ross County	2017–18	Scottish Premiership	0	0	0	0	0	0	—		0	0
Ross County	2018–19	Scottish Championship	0	0	0	0	1	0	1 (Note: Appearance in the Scottish Challenge Cup)	0	2	0
Ross County	Total		2	0	0	0	1	0	1	0	4	0
Stranraer (loan)	2017-18	Scottish League One	14	0	0	0	0	0	0	0	14	0
Greenock Morton	2018–19	Scottish Championship	7	0	1	0	0	0	0	0	8	0
Greenock Morton	2019–20	Scottish Championship	0	0	0	0	0	0	0	0	0	0
Greenock Morton	Total		7	0	1	0	0	0	0	0	8	0
Career total			23	0	1	0	1	0	1	0	26	0
