= Tony Dingwall =

Scottish footballer

Personal information
- Date of birth: 25 July 1994 (age 32)
- Place of birth: Inverness, Scotland
- Position: Midfielder

Team information
- Current team: Brora Rangers

Youth career
- 2006–2014: Ross County

Senior career*
Years	Team	Apps	(Gls)
2014–2019	Ross County	47	(4)
2017	→ Elgin City (loan)	3	(0)
2019–2020	Raith Rovers	25	(0)
2020–2022	Elgin City	35	(1)
2022–	Brora Rangers		
- * Club domestic league appearances and goals as of 11:31, 3 March 2022 (UTC)

Tony Dingwall (born 25 July 1994) is a Scottish footballer who plays as a midfielder for Highland League club Brora Rangers. He has previously played for Ross County, Raith Rovers and Elgin City.

== Career ==
=== Ross County ===
Dingwall made his first appearance for the Ross County first team on 30 August 2014, in a 4–0 defeat at Hamilton. He scored his first goal for the club on 13 December, when he scored both of the team's goals in a 2–2 draw at Motherwell. On 23 December 2014, he signed a new contract, keeping him at Ross County until summer 2017.

On 9 November 2017, Dingwall signed for Scottish League Two club Elgin City on a one-month emergency loan. Following Ross County's relegation to the Scottish Championship Tony, along with his brother Russell, signed a contract extension keeping him at County until 2019.

=== Raith Rovers ===
Dingwall signed an 18-month contract with Raith Rovers in January 2019. On 15 July 2020 it was announced that Raith Rovers had chosen not to offer Dingwall a contract for the 2020–21 season.

=== Elgin City ===
On 19 December 2020, Dingwall signed for Scottish League Two side Elgin City for the remainder of the 2020–21 season. On 2 March 2022, Dingwall left Elgin City by mutual consent.

=== Brora Rangers ===
On 4 March 2022, Dingwall signed a two-year contract with Highland League side Brora Rangers.

== Personal life ==
Dingwall's brother Russell is also a professional footballer and currently plays for Elgin City.

== Career statistics ==
As of match played 19 February 2022

Club	Season	Division	League		Cup		League Cup		Other		Total	
Club	Season	Division	Apps	Goals	Apps	Goals	Apps	Goals	Apps	Goals	Apps	Goals
Ross County	2014–15	Scottish Premiership	19	2	1	0	0	0	0	0	20	2
Ross County	2015–16	Scottish Premiership	12	2	0	0	3	0	0	0	15	2
Ross County	2016–17	Scottish Premiership	14	0	0	0	2	0	0	0	16	0
Ross County	2017–18	Scottish Premiership	0	0	0	0	0	0	0	0	0	0
Ross County	2018–19	Scottish Championship	2	0	0	0	2	0	4 (Note: Appearances in the Scottish Challenge Cup)	0	8	0
Ross County	Total		47	4	1	0	7	0	4	0	59	4
Elgin City (loan)	2017–18	Scottish League Two	3	0	0	0	0	0	0	0	3	0
Raith Rovers	2018–19	Scottish League One	9	0	2	0	0	0	0	0	11	0
Raith Rovers	2019–20	Scottish League One	16	0	2	0	0	0	3	0	21	0
Raith Rovers	Total		25	0	4	0	0	0	3	0	32	0
Elgin City	2020–21	Scottish League Two	10	1	1	0	0	0	0	0	11	1
Elgin City	2021–22	Scottish League Two	25	0	2	0	4	1	2	0	33	1
Elgin City	Total		35	1	3	0	4	1	2	0	44	2
Career total			110	5	8	0	11	1	9	0	138	6
