= Alex Schalk =

Dutch footballer (born 1992)

Personal information
- Full name: Alex Adrianus Antonius Schalk
- Date of birth: 7 August 1992 (age 34)
- Place of birth: Breda, Netherlands
- Height: 1.71 m (5 ft 7 in)
- Positions: Forward; winger

Team information
- Current team: VVV-Venlo
- Number: 10

Youth career
- Beek Vooruit
- NAC Breda

Senior career*
Years	Team	Apps	(Gls)
2011–2014	NAC Breda	58	(10)
2014	→ PSV (loan)	0	(0)
2014	→ Jong PSV (loan)	16	(6)
2014–2015	Go Ahead Eagles	22	(4)
2015–2018	Ross County	87	(21)
2018–2022	Servette	100	(29)
2022–2024	Urawa Red Diamonds	19	(3)
2024–2025	ADO Den Haag	41	(13)
2025–2026	Murcia	8	(0)
2026–	VVV-Venlo	4	(0)

International career
2012–2013	Netherlands U20	4	(3)
2011–2013	Netherlands U21	4	(0)
- * Club domestic league appearances and goals as of 07:04, 12 October 2026 (UTC)

Alex Adrianus Antonius Schalk (born 7 August 1992) is a Dutch professional footballer who plays as a forward or a winger for Eerste Divisie club VVV-Venlo.

Schalk began his career at NAC Breda, earning the nickname "Der Bomber van Breda" for his goal-scoring abilities. He went on to play for PSV, Go Ahead Eagles, and Ross County, where he scored the decisive goal in the 2015–16 Scottish League Cup final. Following a successful spell at Servette in Switzerland, where he made 100 league appearances, and a stint with Urawa Red Diamonds in Japan, Schalk returned to the Netherlands, signing with ADO Den Haag in 2024.

== Career ==
Schalk came through the youth ranks of NAC Breda, earning the nickname of "Der Bomber van Breda" because of his reputation as a footballer with remarkable goalscoring instincts, comparable to legendary German striker Gerd Müller. On 1 May 2011, he made his senior debut for NAC against Heracles Almelo in the 33rd round of the 2010–11 Eredivisie season, replacing Ömer Bayram in the 85th minute. The match ended in a 2–1 home loss. On 9 August 2011, Schalk agreed to a new two-year contract at NAC until June 2013.

After losing perspective on playing matches for NAC Breda, Schalk was sent on loan to PSV, where he played for Eerste Divisie side Jong PSV. He scored six times in 16 matches for the Eerste Divisie side. On 28 June 2014, Schalk signed a one-year deal with Eredivisie side Go Ahead Eagles on a free transfer.

Schalk moved to Scottish Premiership club Ross County in October 2015. On 13 March 2016, he scored a late winner as Ross County won their first major silverware with a 2–1 victory over Hibernian in the Scottish League Cup final. On 16 April 2017, in the 88th minute of a Premiership match at home to Celtic, he won a penalty which was converted to earn Ross County a 2–2 draw. The act was described as a "clear dive" while Celtic manager Brendan Rodgers accused Schalk of "blatant cheating". Days later, he was charged with committing an "act of simulation" and handed a two-game suspension by the Scottish Football Association's compliance officer which both he and his club accepted.

After Ross County were relegated to the Scottish Championship, Schalk was allowed to leave and join the Swiss side Servette. He made headlines in October 2019 after giving the middle finger to FC Sion fans after scoring a goal. As a result, he was suspended for two games.

On 25 March 2022, Schalk signed with Urawa Red Diamonds in Japan. On 15 December 2023, he scored the only goal in a 1–0 victory over León in the FIFA Club World Cup second round.

On 12 January 2024, Schalk signed a contract with ADO Den Haag until June 2025, with an option to extend to 2026.

On 20 July 2025, Schalk signed for Murcia in the Primera Federación, the third tier of Spanish football. He made nine appearances, mostly as a substitute, scoring once, before leaving in February 2026 for personal reasons. He then trained with NAC Breda's under-21 team for several months to maintain his fitness.

On 24 June 2026, Schalk signed a one-year contract with Eerste Divisie club VVV-Venlo.

== Career statistics ==
As of match played 4 September 2026

Appearances and goals by club, season and competition
Club	Season	League			National cup (Note: Includes KNVB Cup, Scottish Cup, Swiss Cup, Emperor's Cup, Copa del Rey)		League cup (Note: Includes Scottish League Cup, J.League Cup)		Continental		Other		Total	
Club	Season	Division	Apps	Goals	Apps	Goals	Apps	Goals	Apps	Goals	Apps	Goals	Apps	Goals
NAC Breda	2010–11	Eredivisie	1	0	0	0	—		—		—		1	0
NAC Breda	2011–12	Eredivisie	32	6	1	0	—		—		—		33	6
NAC Breda	2012–13	Eredivisie	20	3	3	2	—		—		—		23	5
NAC Breda	2013–14	Eredivisie	5	1	1	0	—		—		—		6	1
NAC Breda	Total		58	10	5	2	—		—		—		63	12
Jong PSV (loan)	2013–14	Eerste Divisie	16	6	—		—		—		—		16	6
Go Ahead Eagles	2014–15	Eredivisie	20	4	1	0	—		—		2 (Note: Appearances in Eredivisie promotion/relegation play-offs)	0	23	4
Go Ahead Eagles	2015–16	Eerste Divisie	2	0	0	0	—		2 (Note: Appearances in UEFA Europa League)	0	—		4	0
Go Ahead Eagles	Total		22	4	1	0	—		2	0	2	0	27	4
Ross County	2015–16	Scottish Premiership	25	5	4	2	3	2	—		—		32	9
Ross County	2016–17	Scottish Premiership	32	5	2	0	4	3	—		—		38	8
Ross County	2017–18	Scottish Premiership	30	11	1	0	5	2	—		—		36	13
Ross County	Total		87	21	7	2	12	7	—		—		106	30
Servette	2018–19	Challenge League	27	9	1	0	—		—		—		28	9
Servette	2019–20	Swiss Super League	21	7	2	0	—		—		—		22	7
Servette	2020–21	Swiss Super League	31	10	3	0	—		1	0	—		34	10
Servette	2021–22	Swiss Super League	21	3	2	3	—		1 (Note: Appearance in UEFA Europa Conference League)	0	—		24	6
Servette	Total		100	29	8	3	—		2	0	—		110	32
Urawa Red Diamonds	2022	J1 League	12	1	1	0	0	0	3 (Note: Appearances in AFC Champions League)	3	—		16	4
Urawa Red Diamonds	2023	J1 League	7	2	0	0	4	2	3	0	3 (Note: Appearance in FIFA Club World Cup)	1	17	5
Urawa Red Diamonds	Total		19	3	1	0	4	2	6	3	3	1	33	9
ADO Den Haag	2023–24	Eerste Divisie	17	3	1	0	—		—		2	3	20	6
ADO Den Haag	2024–25	Eerste Divisie	24	10	0	0	—		—		2	0	26	10
ADO Den Haag	Total		41	13	1	0	—		—		4	3	46	16
Murcia	2025–26	Primera Federación	8	0	1	1	—		—		—		9	1
VVV-Venlo	2026–27	Eerste Divisie	4	0	0	0	—		—		—		4	0
Career total			355	86	24	8	16	9	10	3	9	4	414	110

== Honours ==
=== Club ===
Ross County

- Scottish League Cup: 2015–16

Servette

- Swiss Challenge League: 2018–19

Urawa Red Diamonds

- AFC Champions League: 2022
