= Craig Curran =

English footballer (born 1989)

Personal information
- Full name: Craig Carl Curran
- Date of birth: 23 August 1989 (age 37)
- Place of birth: Liverpool, England
- Position: Forward

Youth career
- Tranmere Rovers

Senior career*
| Years | Team | Apps | (Gls) |
| 2006–2010 | Tranmere Rovers | 97 | (14) |
| 2010–2012 | Carlisle United | 57 | (8) |
| 2012 | → Morecambe (loan) | 7 | (1) |
| 2012–2013 | Rochdale | 4 | (0) |
| 2012–2013 | → Chester (loan) | 11 | (7) |
| 2013 | → Limerick (loan) | 13 | (3) |
| 2013–2014 | Limerick | 17 | (4) |
| 2014–2015 | Nuneaton Town | 13 | (1) |
| 2015–2018 | Ross County | 107 | (23) |
| 2018–2019 | Dundee United | 16 | (3) |
| 2019 | Dundee | 14 | (0) |
| 2020–2022 | Connah's Quay Nomads | 53 | (13) |
| 2022–2023 | Airbus UK Broughton | 7 | (0) |
| 2023 | → Marine (loan) | 2 | (0) |
| 2023–2024 | Vauxhall Motors | 8 | (2) |
| Total | | 426 | (79) |
- * Club domestic league appearances and goals

Craig Carl Curran (born 23 August 1989) is an English former professional footballer. Curran plays as a striker, who can operate in midfield or attack. He began his career with Tranmere Rovers, making his debut in 2007 and going on to play over 100 games for the club before joining Carlisle United in 2010 and then Rochdale two years later. He joined Irish club Limerick in 2013, returning to England the following year to play non-League football with Nuneaton Town. He then moved to Scotland in 2015, spending three years with Ross County followed by shorter spells with Dundee United and Dundee. He joined Welsh side Connah's Quay Nomads in 2020 and would win two Cymru Premier titles as well as a Welsh League Cup, before joining Airbus UK Broughton and going on loan to Marine before retiring in 2024 after a brief stint with Vauxhall Motors.

== Career ==
=== Tranmere Rovers ===
Curran was born and raised in Liverpool, England, and was educated at the Liverpool Blue Coat School. He is a product of the Youth system at Tranmere Rovers, signing his first professional contract in April 2006, agreeing a deal until 2007. During the 2006–07 season, he was top scorer for the reserve side.

Initially not considered to be ready for first team football by manager Ronnie Moore, Curran finally made his first appearance for Tranmere on Saturday 13 January 2007, coming on as an 84th-minute substitute in the 3–2 loss to Bristol City. He scored with his first ever senior touch at Prenton Park against Brighton & Hove Albion on Monday 9 April 2007. The goal was also Curran's first ever senior goal.

On 5 May 2007, Curran scored three times in the first 36 minutes to record his first hat-trick for the club as Tranmere won 3–1 at home against Brentford. The feat also broke a record set by Tranmere legend Dixie Dean as the youngest ever player to score a hat-trick in a Rovers' shirt. The record was originally set on 25 October 1924. He finished his first ever season with four goals in four appearances, with only two of them being starts.

Just eight days before the start of the 2007–08 season, Curran signed a contract with Tranmere, keeping him at the club until 2010. Curran then scored two goals in two games against Carlisle United on 8 September 2007 and Luton Town on 14 September 2007. During the early part of the 2007–08 season he was used sparingly by manager Ronnie Moore, being limited to a handful of starts, although he made regular appearances from the bench. On 10 November 2007, he was sent off for the first time in his senior career, during an FA Cup First Round match away at Chesterfield, picking up two bookings after coming on as a late substitute, one for delaying the restart of play (preventing a free kick being taken) and the second for a foul on a Chesterfield player. Curran ended his 2007–08 season, with forty appearances, scoring two times in all competitions.

Ahead of the 2008–09 season, Curran stated he would improve his fitness to get first team football, as well as scoring goals. The work soon paid off when Curran scored two goals in his first four league game, against Hartlepool United on 16 August 2008 and Northampton Town on 30 August 2008. However, Curran suffered a groin injury, stomach muscle injury and back strain that kept him out for months. After making his return from injury in a reserve match against Bury on 14 March 2009, Curran made his first team return three days later, coming on as a substitute for Charlie Barnett in the 68th minute, in a 1–0 loss against Cheltenham Town. Having returned to the side Curran was hopeful that he could help the club achieve a play-off place. In the last game of the season, he scored his third goal of the season, in a 1–1 draw against Scunthorpe United, however the result saw the club miss out on the play-offs. Curran ended his 2008–09 season, making sixteen appearances and scoring three times.

The 2009–10 season saw Curran regain his first team place after returning to fitness. He scored his first goal of the season, in the first round of the League Cup, in a 4–0 win over Grimsby Town on 11 August 2009. He then scored two goals in two games, against Huddersfield Town on 1 December 2009 and then four days on 5 December 2009, against Brentford. Two weeks later on 19 December 2009, Curran scored his third goal of the season, in a 2–0 win over Bristol Rovers. Curran then went on a run of fifteen games without scoring which ended when he scored in a 3–1 win over Norwich City on 2 April 2010. Two weeks later on 17 April 2010, Curran scored his fifth goal of the season, in a 3–1 win over Exeter City. During the season Curran made fifty appearances, scoring six times in all competitions.

At the end of the 2009–10 season, Curran was offered a new contract by the club.

=== Carlisle United ===
Curran signed for Carlisle United upon conclusion of the 2009–10 season on a free transfer, his contract at Tranmere having elapsed and not been renewed. Upon joining the club, Manager Greg Abbott said he believed that Curran could be the signing of the year.

Curran made his Carlisle debut, in the opening game of the season, where he helped the club win a penalty, which Ian Harte successfully converted, in a 2–0 win over Brentford. It took until 11 September 2010, for him to score his first Carlisle goal, in a 1–0 win over Sheffield Wednesday. His second goal then came on 23 October 2010, in a 4–3 loss against Charlton Athletic. Curran scored his first goal of 2011, in a 4–0 win over Bristol Rovers. Between 15 February 2011 and 1 March 2011, Curran scored three goals in five matches against Oldham Athletic, Exeter City and Charlton Athletic Curran scored a brace on 16 April 2011, in a 4–1 win over Colchester United, which earned him the Man of the Match award. He was a regular starter in his first season, and scored eight goals.

However, in the 2011–12 season, Curran found starts, and even substitute appearances, more difficult to come by owing to the arrival of Lee Miller, Paddy Madden and Rory Loy at Brunton Park. Not only that, Curran suffered a knee injury that kept him sidelined until November.

On 22 March 2012, Curran signed for Morecambe on loan until the end of the season. Two days later, he made his Morecambe debut, coming on as a substitute for Lewis Alessandra in the 66th minute, in a 1–0 win over Shrewsbury Town. Curran also featured in a reserve game for Morecambe against a Manchester City side which saw the return of Carlos Tevez. Morecambe lost 6–1 but Curran got on the score sheet for the Shirmps. On his next appearance for the first team he scored a diving header, in a 2–1 win against Oxford United on 31 March 2012.

On 7 May 2012, Carlisle United announced that Curran's contract would not be renewed beyond the 2011–12 season.

=== Rochdale ===
Curran then signed on noncontract terms at Rochdale on 10 August 2012. He made his Rochdale debut, coming on as a substitute for Dele Adebola in the 70th minute, in a 4–2 loss against Torquay United on 25 August 2012. Curran then provided an assist for Jason Kennedy, for the winning goal in a 3–2 win over Accrington Stanley on 6 October 2012.

On 9 November 2012, he joined Conference North side Chester on a one-month loan deal. Curran impressed in his short time at the club which led to his loan being extended for a further month. Curran scored seven goals in 11 league appearances, the most memorable, a 4–1 win against Bishop's Stortford where he scored a hat-trick after coming on as a second-half substitute.

At the end of the 2012–13 season, Curran was released by Rochdale.

=== Limerick ===
On 15 February 2013, Curran signed on loan with Limerick in the League of Ireland Premier Division.

Curran made his Limerick debut on 10 March 2013, in a 0–0 draw against Cork City, where he played 90 minutes, playing as a centre-forward. Curran scored his first Limerick goal one week later on 23 March 2013, in a 2–1 loss against Sligo Rovers Two weeks later on 2 April 2013, he scored his second Limerick goal, in a 1–1 draw against Shamrock Rovers. Two months later on 29 June 2013, Curran scored his third goal of the season, in a 3–2 win over Dundalk.

Curran signed for Limerick on a permanent deal until the end of the 2014 season on 1 July. Curran's first game after signing for the club on a permanent basis came on 5 July 2013, in a 1–0 win over Bohemians. In the next game against Drogheda United four days later, he scored twice in a 4–4 draw. Curran later scored two goals to take his tally to seven for the season, against Cork City and UCD. In his first season at Limerick Curran made twenty-six appearances and scored seven times.

In his second season at Limerick Curran struggled to score goals in four appearances, due to injuries. After media speculation in Ireland claiming that Curran was leaving the club, it was confirmed the next day that he had left the club.

Following his departure, Curran made a farewell speech, paying tribute to the club and its supporters. During his time at Limerick, Curran was a fans favourite.

=== Nuneaton Town ===
On 29 August 2014, Curran signed for Nuneaton Town, making his debut in the club's 2–1 win against Altrincham at Liberty Way the next day.

Curran scored his first Nuneaton Town goal on 27 September 2014, in a 2–1 win over Dartford. Curran left Nuneaton in November 2014, agreeing a mutual termination of his contract.

=== Scottish football ===
==== Ross County ====
On 2 January 2015, Curran signed for Scottish Premiership club Ross County on a contract until the end of the 2014–15 season. He scored on his debut to help Ross County to a 1–1 draw away to Dundee on 4 January 2015. On 21 February 2015, Curran scored his second goal for the club, in a 3–1 win over Partick Thistle. He then scored three goals in three games, against Partick Thistle on 7 March 2015, Hamilton Academical on 14 March 2015 and once again seven days later, against Kilmarnock. After helping the club retain their Scottish Premiership status for the next season, on 30 April 2015, Curran signed a new two-year contract, keeping him at Ross County until 2017. He left the club in May 2018 after they were relegated from the Premiership.

==== Dundee United and Dundee ====
Curran signed a three-year contract with Dundee United on 1 June 2018. After a frustrating start to the season, he left United in January 2019, moving across Tannadice Street to join their Dundee derby rivals Dundee. Curran linked up with manager Jim McIntyre, who had previously coached him at Ross County. He would fail to score for the rest of the season as Dundee were relegated to the Scottish Championship. He began the following season with Dundee, and scored his first goal for the club in a 3–0 win over Raith Rovers in the League Cup. On 2 September 2019, Curran left Dundee by mutual consent.

=== Welsh Football ===
==== Connah's Quay Nomads ====
In January 2020 he signed for Connah's Quay Nomads. He scored his first goal for the club on 14 February against Caernarfon Town. After a successful 18 months with the club, Curran signed a new deal in June 2022. He left the club at the end of the 2021–22 season.

==== Airbus UK Broughton ====
On 19 August 2022, Curran joined Cymru Premier side Airbus UK Broughton. He went on loan to English club Marine in January 2023. Curran retired in March 2023 due to concussion issues, but announced in September that he was once again fit to play.

=== Vauxhall Motors and retirement ===
In October 2023, Curran returned to football from his brief retirement with Northern Premier League Division One West club Vauxhall Motors. Curran scored his first goals for the Motormen on 23 December, netting a brace in an away win over Witton Albion. On 10 January 2024, Vauxhall Motors announced that Curran would once again retire from football.

== Career statistics ==
As of match played 26 December 2023

Appearances and goals by club, season and competition
| Club | Season | League | | | National Cup | | League Cup | | Other | | Total | |
| Club | Season | Division | Apps | Goals | Apps | Goals | Apps | Goals | Apps | Goals | Apps | Goals |
|---|---|---|---|---|---|---|---|---|---|---|---|---|
| Tranmere Rovers | 2006–07 | League One | 4 | 4 | 0 | 0 | 0 | 0 | 0 | 0 | 4 | 4 |
| Tranmere Rovers | 2007–08 | League One | 35 | 2 | 3 | 0 | 1 | 0 | 1 (Note: Appearances in Football League Trophy) | 0 | 40 | 2 |
| Tranmere Rovers | 2008–09 | League One | 15 | 3 | 0 | 0 | 1 | 0 | 1 | 0 | 17 | 3 |
| Tranmere Rovers | 2009–10 | League One | 43 | 5 | 5 | 0 | 2 | 1 | 1 | 1 | 51 | 7 |
| Tranmere Rovers | Total | | 97 | 14 | 8 | 0 | 4 | 1 | 3 | 1 | 112 | 16 |
| Carlisle United | 2010–11 | League One | 45 | 8 | 3 | 0 | 1 | 0 | 5 | 0 | 54 | 8 |
| Carlisle United | 2011–12 | League One | 12 | 0 | 1 | 0 | 2 | 0 | 1 | 0 | 16 | 0 |
| Carlisle United | Total | | 57 | 8 | 4 | 0 | 3 | 0 | 6 | 0 | 70 | 8 |
| Morecambe (loan) | 2011–12 | League Two | 7 | 1 | 0 | 0 | 0 | 0 | 0 | 0 | 7 | 1 |
| Rochdale | 2012–13 | League Two | 4 | 0 | 0 | 0 | 1 | 0 | 1 | 0 | 6 | 0 |
| Chester (loan) | 2012–13 | Conference North | 11 | 7 | 0 | 0 | — | | 2 (Note: Appearances in FA Trophy) | 0 | 13 | 7 |
| Limerick (loan) | 2013 | League of Ireland; Premier Division | 13 | 3 | 0 | 0 | 0 | 0 | 0 | 0 | 13 | 3 |
| Limerick | 2013 | League of Ireland; Premier Division | 13 | 4 | 0 | 0 | 0 | 0 | 0 | 0 | 13 | 4 |
| Limerick | 2014 | League of Ireland; Premier Division | 4 | 0 | 0 | 0 | 0 | 0 | 0 | 0 | 4 | 0 |
| Limerick | Total | | 30 | 7 | 0 | 0 | 0 | 0 | 0 | 0 | 30 | 7 |
| Nuneaton Town | 2014–15 | Conference Premier | 13 | 1 | 2 | 0 | — | | 0 | 0 | 15 | 1 |
| Ross County | 2014–15 | Scottish Premiership | 19 | 5 | 0 | 0 | 0 | 0 | — | | 19 | 5 |
| Ross County | 2015–16 | Scottish Premiership | 19 | 7 | 0 | 0 | 1 | 0 | — | | 20 | 7 |
| Ross County | 2016–17 | Scottish Premiership | 34 | 5 | 1 | 0 | 4 | 2 | — | | 39 | 7 |
| Ross County | 2017–18 | Scottish Premiership | 35 | 6 | 0 | 0 | 5 | 4 | — | | 40 | 10 |
| Ross County | Total | | 107 | 23 | 1 | 0 | 10 | 6 | 0 | 0 | 118 | 29 |
| Dundee United | 2018–19 | Scottish Championship | 16 | 3 | 2 | 0 | 0 | 0 | 0 | 0 | 18 | 3 |
| Dundee | 2018–19 | Scottish Premiership | 14 | 0 | 0 | 0 | 0 | 0 | 0 | 0 | 14 | 0 |
| Dundee | 2019–20 | Scottish Championship | 0 | 0 | 0 | 0 | 3 | 1 | 0 | 0 | 3 | 1 |
| Dundee | Total | | 14 | 0 | 0 | 0 | 3 | 1 | 0 | 0 | 17 | 1 |
| Connah's Quay Nomads | 2019–20 | Cymru Premier | 4 | 2 | 1 | 0 | 1 | 0 | — | | 6 | 2 |
| Connah's Quay Nomads | 2020–21 | Cymru Premier | 28 | 6 | 0 | 0 | 0 | 0 | 1 (Note: Appearance in UEFA Champions League) | 0 | 29 | 6 |
| Connah's Quay Nomads | 2021–22 | Cymru Premier | 21 | 5 | 2 | 0 | 5 | 1 | 3 (Note: Appearances in UEFA Champions League and UEFA Europa Conference League) | 1 | 31 | 7 |
| Connah's Quay Nomads | Total | | 53 | 13 | 3 | 0 | 6 | 1 | 4 | 1 | 66 | 15 |
| Airbus UK Broughton | 2022–23 | Cymru Premier | 7 | 0 | 0 | 0 | 0 | 0 | 0 | 0 | 7 | 0 |
| Marine (loan) | 2022–23 | NPL Premier Division | 2 | 0 | 0 | 0 | 0 | 0 | 0 | 0 | 2 | 0 |
| Vauxhall Motors | 2023–24 | Northern Premier League Div. One West | 8 | 2 | 0 | 0 | 0 | 0 | 1 (Note: Appearance in Cheshire Senior Cup) | 0 | 9 | 2 |
| Career total | | | 426 | 79 | 20 | 0 | 27 | 9 | 17 | 2 | 490 | 90 |

== Honours ==
Carlisle United

- Football League Trophy: 2010–11

Connah's Quay Nomads

- Cymru Premier: 2019–20, 2020–21
- Welsh League Cup: 2021–22
