= Jason Naismith =

Scottish footballer (born 1994)

Personal information
- Full name: Jason Naismith
- Date of birth: 25 June 1994 (age 32)
- Place of birth: Paisley, Scotland
- Position: Right-back

Team information
- Current team: Johnstone Burgh

Youth career
- St Mirren

Senior career*
Years	Team	Apps	(Gls)
2012–2017	St Mirren	93	(4)
2012	→ Greenock Morton (loan)	4	(0)
2013	→ Cowdenbeath (loan)	5	(0)
2017–2018	Ross County	51	(2)
2018–2020	Peterborough United	43	(1)
2019–2020	→ Hibernian (loan)	13	(1)
2020–2021	Ross County	17	(0)
2021–2022	Kilmarnock	16	(1)
2022–2023	Queen's Park	3	(0)
2023	Cove Rangers	13	(0)
2023–2025	Johnstone Burgh	23	(4)
2025	→ Darvel (loan)	9	(1)

International career
2011	Scotland U17	2	(0)
2012	Scotland U18	1	(0)
2012	Scotland U20	1	(0)
2014	Scotland U21	1	(0)
- * Club domestic league appearances and goals as of 27 January 2025

Jason Naismith (born 25 June 1994) is a Scottish professional footballer who plays as a defender for Johnstone Burgh. Naismith has previously played for St Mirren, Greenock Morton, Cowdenbeath, Peterborough United, Hibernian, Ross County, Kilmarnock and Queen's Park. He has also represented Scotland in youth internationals, including one game at under-21 level.

== Club career ==
=== St Mirren ===
Naismith was born in Paisley. A member of St Mirren's under-19 squad, Naismith made his first team debut as a substitute on 25 February 2012 against Aberdeen in the Scottish Premier League. In May 2012, Naismith was loaned out to Greenock Morton for six months. In doing so he became the first player in history to be loaned between the two rival clubs.

Naismith joined Cowdenbeath for a month on loan at the end of February 2013. On 24 May 2013, it was confirmed by St Mirren that Naismith had signed a new one-year deal to keep him at the club until the end of season 2013–14.

On 22 November 2013 it was announced that Naismith had signed a three-year contract extension, tying him to the club until the summer of 2017. Naismith scored his first senior goal for the club on 26 December 2013, in a 4–1 Scottish Premiership victory over Dundee United. During the 2013–14 season Jason became a regular first team player for the club, making 27 league appearances and scoring 2 goals.

On 15 August 2015, Naismith suffered serious knee ligament damage in a 2–1 home defeat to Dumbarton in the Scottish Championship.

=== Ross County ===
Naismith signed for Scottish Premiership side Ross County on 18 January 2017, moving for an undisclosed fee.

=== Peterborough United ===
Naismith moved in June 2018 to EFL League One club Peterborough United, with whom he signed a three-year contract.

He was loaned to Hibernian in September 2019. Naismith made 14 appearances for Hibs, but suffered a serious knee injury during a Scottish Cup match at Dundee United in January 2020. Following the formal conclusion of the truncated 2019/20 season, Naismith returned to his parent club in May 2020.

On 7 December 2020, Naismith left Peterborough United via mutual agreement.

=== Ross County (second spell) ===
Naismith signed a short-term contract with Ross County on 8 December 2020, although he cannot register to play for them until the January 2021 transfer window opens. Naismith was released by County on 27 May 2021 along with nine other players.

== International career ==
Naismith has represented Scotland at under 17 level. He made his debut for the under 17s on 11 March 2011 playing the full 90 minutes against Slovakia. He was also called up to the Scotland under-18 squad in February 2012, and made his debut against Serbia in April that year.

In May 2012, Naismith spent time with the Scotland U20 squad at the ADO Den Haag youth tournament in the Netherlands. He made one appearance in the competition as a substitute against ADO, but was injured and missed the remainder of the tournament.

On 18 November 2014, Naismith earned his first Scotland Under–21 cap against Switzerland in a friendly match. The 20-year-old came on as a 72nd-minute substitute, replacing Marcus Fraser. The match ended in a 1–1 draw.

== Career statistics ==
As of match played 16 May 2021

Appearances and goals by club, season and competition
Club	Season	League			Cup		League Cup		Other		Total	
Club	Season	Division	Apps	Goals	Apps	Goals	Apps	Goals	Apps	Goals	Apps	Goals
St Mirren	2011–12	Scottish Premier League	2	0	0	0	0	0	—		2	0
St Mirren	2012–13	Scottish Premier League	0	0	0	0	0	0	—		0	0
St Mirren	2013–14	Scottish Premiership	27	2	2	0	0	0	—		29	2
St Mirren	2014–15	Scottish Premiership	38	2	2	0	1	0	—		41	2
St Mirren	2015–16	Scottish Championship	5	0	0	0	0	0	1 (Note: Appearances in the Scottish Challenge Cup)	0	6	0
St Mirren	2016–17	Scottish Championship	21	0	1	0	4	0	2	0	28	0
St Mirren	Total		93	4	5	0	5	0	3	0	106	4
Greenock Morton (loan)	2012–13	Scottish First Division	4	0	0	0	2	0	1	0	7	0
Cowdenbeath (loan)	2012–13	Scottish First Division	5	0	0	0	0	0	0	0	5	0
Ross County	2016–17	Scottish Premiership	16	0	0	0	0	0	—		16	0
Ross County	2017–18	Scottish Premiership	35	2	1	0	5	0	—		41	2
Ross County	Total		51	2	1	0	5	0	0	0	57	2
Peterborough United	2018–19	EFL League One	43	1	3	0	1	0	3 (Note: Appearances in the EFL Trophy)	0	50	1
Peterborough United	2019–20	EFL League One	0	0	0	0	1	0	0	0	1	0
Peterborough United	2020–21	EFL League One	0	0	0	0	0	0	2 (Note: Appearances in the EFL Trophy)	0	2	0
Peterborough United	Total		43	1	3	0	2	0	5	0	53	1
Hibernian (loan)	2019–20	Scottish Premiership	13	1	1	0	0	0	—		14	1
Ross County	2020–21	Scottish Premiership	17	0	1	0	0	0	—		18	0
Career total			226	8	11	0	14	0	9	0	260	8
