= Aaron McCarey =

Irish footballer

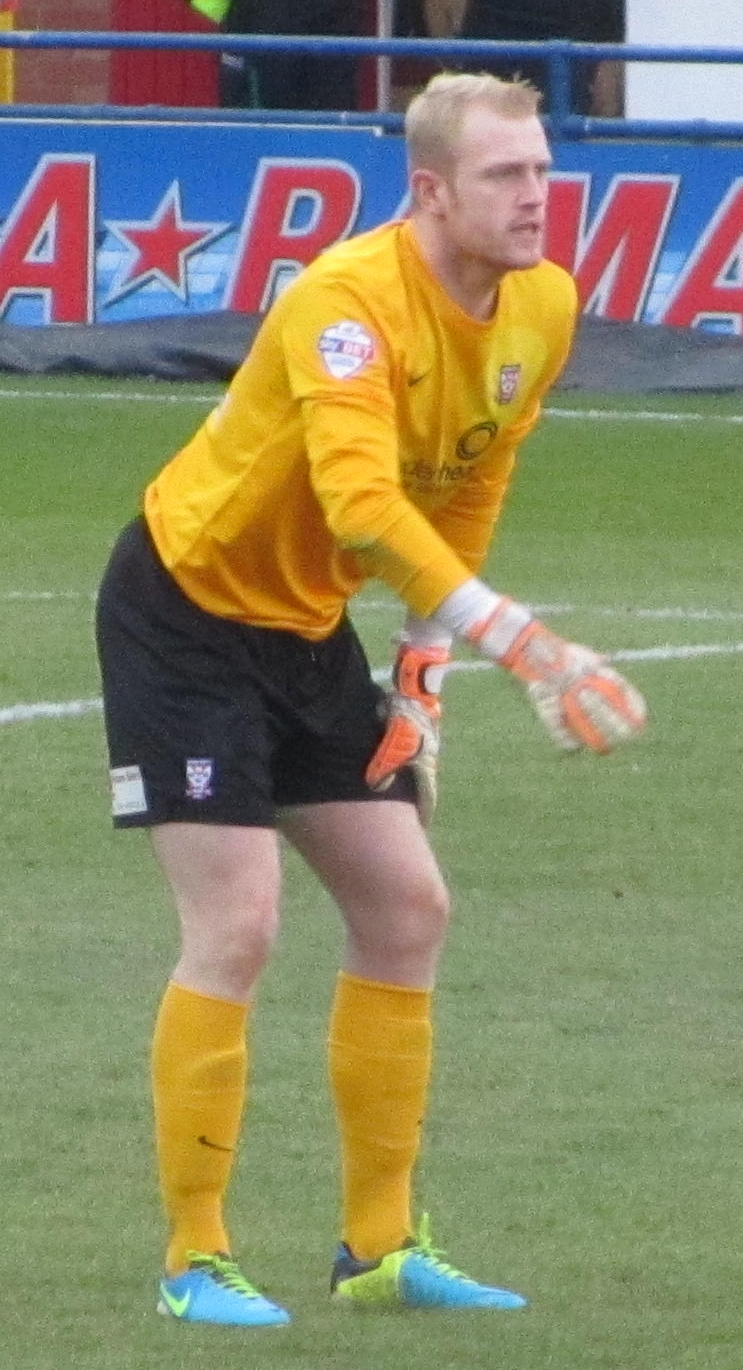
- McCarey playing for York City in 2013

Personal information
- Full name: Aaron McCarey
- Date of birth: 14 January 1992 (age 34)
- Place of birth: Monaghan, Ireland
- Height: 6 ft 2 in (1.88 m)
- Position: Goalkeeper

Team information
- Current team: Portadown
- Number: 1

Youth career
- –2009: Monaghan United

Senior career*
Years	Team	Apps	(Gls)
2009	Monaghan United	21	(0)
2010–2016	Wolverhampton Wanderers	5	(0)
2011	→ A.F.C. Telford United (loan)	4	(0)
2012	→ Walsall (loan)	8	(0)
2013	→ Walsall (loan)	6	(0)
2013–2014	→ York City (loan)	5	(0)
2015	→ Portsmouth (loan)	6	(0)
2015	→ Bury (loan)	1	(0)
2016–2018	Ross County	18	(0)
2018	Warrenpoint Town	16	(0)
2019–2020	Dundalk	6	(0)
2021	Cliftonville	27	(0)
2021–2024	Glentoran	132	(0)
2024-	Portadown	58	(0)

International career
2009	Republic of Ireland U17	1	(0)
2010	Republic of Ireland U18	1	(0)
2010–2011	Republic of Ireland U19	14	(0)
2012–2013	Republic of Ireland U21	10	(0)
- * Club domestic league appearances and goals as of 15:43, 23 February 2026 (UTC)

Aaron McCarey (born 14 January 1992) is an Irish professional footballer who plays as a goalkeeper for NIFL Premiership side Portadown.

McCarey joined Wolverhampton Wanderers from Monaghan United in January 2010 before having loan spells with A.F.C. Telford United, Walsall, York City, Portsmouth and Bury. He later joined Ross County.

== Club career ==
Born in Monaghan, County Monaghan, McCarey began his career at his hometown club Monaghan United in their youth system aged eight, before breaking into the first team as a 17-year-old. He established himself as the League of Ireland First Division club's first choice goalkeeper in the 2009 season, before moving to join the youth ranks of Premier League club Wolverhampton Wanderers in January 2010, after having agreed to the transfer in September 2009.

The goalkeeper gained his first experience of English football when he joined promotion-chasing Conference North club A.F.C. Telford United on 16 February 2011 on a one-month loan. He played four full matches for the club, all victories, starting with a 2–1 home win over Alfreton Town on 22 February 2011. His first clean sheet came on 5 March in his third match, a 3–0 win away to Guiseley.

On 11 August 2012, McCarey was named in a Wolves matchday squad for the first time, remaining unused as Carl Ikeme played in their League Cup first round match against Aldershot Town at home, a penalty shoot-out victory. His first league call-up for the club was on 6 October, in their 1–0 away win over Blackburn Rovers in the Championship. He joined League One club Walsall on 16 November 2012 on a one-month loan, where he made his Football League debut a day later in a 2–2 draw away to Crawley Town. In February 2013, he was re-loaned to Walsall initially for the remainder of the 2012–13 season, but was recalled after a month to cover an injury to Ikeme. Following their relegation to League One at the end of 2012–13, Wolves took up the option of a one-year contract extension on McCarey.

McCarey made his club debut on 3 September 2013 in a Football League Trophy tie against Walsall. On 28 November 2013, he signed a new two-and-a-half-year contract with Wolves, and on the same day joined League Two club York City on loan until 4 January 2014. He made his debut two days later in a 0–0 home draw with Rochdale, and made five appearances for York before being recalled by Wolves on 2 January 2014 due to an injury to Carl Ikeme, and Wayne Hennessey refusing to play. McCarey made his Wolves league debut the following day, in a 1–0 away defeat to Gillingham. He made four further league appearances as Wolves won the League One title.

McCarey was suspended by the club on 16 May 2015 after failing a drugs test. He joined League Two club Portsmouth on a one-month emergency loan on 23 September 2015, following injuries to Paul Jones and Brian Murphy. At the conclusion of his loan spell at Portsmouth, he was almost immediately loaned out again, this time joining League One club Bury for a month on 25 October 2016. However, after making his first appearance for the club, he suffered a groin injury and the loan was cut short. At the conclusion of 2015–16, Wolves announced McCarey's contract would not be renewed.

McCarey signed with Scottish Premiership club Ross County on 25 May 2016. He was released in May 2018 following County's relegation to the Championship.

McCarey signed for NIFL Premiership newcomers Warrenpoint Town on a short-term deal in September 2018.

On 21 December 2018, McCarey agreed to sign for League of Ireland club Dundalk on a two-year deal. He played regularly in Dundalk's 2019 League of Ireland Cup campaign, beating Derry City FC in a penalty shootout in the Final & helped Dundalk beat Linfield FC in the 2019 Champions Cup Final. He made his European debut against Rapid Vienna at the Allianz Stadion in the 2020–21 UEFA Europa League group stage.

McCarey signed for Cliftonville in the NIFL Premiership in December 2020.

In August 2021, McCarey signed for Glentoran. On 16 October, McCarey was sent off in a 2–2 draw against Coleraine where he would clash with teammate Bobby Burns, shoving him to the ground, following Cathair Friel scoring the equalising goal for Coleraine.

On 7 May 2024, it was announced that McCarey would be one of ten players departing Glentoran upon the expiry of their contracts.

== International career ==
McCarey was capped once for the Republic of Ireland national under-17 team, playing in a 3–1 home defeat to Poland in a friendly on 21 April 2009. Over a year later, on 11 May 2010, he made his only appearance for the under-18 team in a 1–0 friendly away defeat to Macedonia. McCarey made his under-19 debut on 9 August 2010 in a friendly against Ukraine, which finished a 0–0 draw at home. He played at the 2011 UEFA European Under-19 Championship, with the Republic of Ireland being beaten 5–0 by Spain in the semi-final on 29 July 2011. This was his last appearance for the under-19s, earning 14 caps at this level. McCarey's debut at under-21 level came as a substitute for Ian McLoughlin in a 2–1 friendly home victory over Denmark on 28 May 2012. He was capped 10 times by the under-21s in 2012 and 2013. He received his first call up to the senior Republic of Ireland national team as a replacement for Keiren Westwood, for a friendly against Spain in New York in June 2013. McCarey had to wait almost five years to get his next senior call-up, again deputising for Keiren Westwood for Ireland's friendly versus Turkey on 23 March 2018.

== Career statistics ==
As of 30 November 2020

Appearances and goals by club, season and competition
Club	Season	League			National cup (Note: Appearances in FAI Cup and Scottish Cup)		League cup (Note: Appearances in League of Ireland Cup, Scottish League Cup and Northern Ireland Football League Cup)		Other		Total	
Club	Season	Division	Apps	Goals	Apps	Goals	Apps	Goals	Apps	Goals	Apps	Goals
Monaghan United	2009	League of Ireland First Division	21	0	4	0	1	0	—		26	0
Wolverhampton Wanderers	2010–11	Premier League	0	0	0	0	0	0	—		0	0
Wolverhampton Wanderers	2011–12	Premier League	0	0	0	0	0	0	—		0	0
Wolverhampton Wanderers	2012–13	Championship	0	0	0	0	0	0	—		0	0
Wolverhampton Wanderers	2013–14	League One	5	0	0	0	0	0	1 (Note: Appearance in Football League Trophy)	0	6	0
Wolverhampton Wanderers	2014–15	Championship	0	0	0	0	1	0	—		1	0
Wolverhampton Wanderers	2015–16	Championship	0	0	0	0	0	0	—		0	0
Wolverhampton Wanderers	Total		5	0	0	0	1	0	1	0	7	0
A.F.C. Telford United (loan)	2010–11	Conference North	4	0	—		—		—		4	0
Walsall (loan)	2012–13	League One	14	0	0	0	—		—		14	0
York City (loan)	2013–14	League Two	5	0	—		—		—		5	0
Portsmouth (loan)	2015–16	League Two	6	0	—		—		—		6	0
Bury (loan)	2015–16	League One	1	0	—		—		—		1	0
Ross County	2016–17	Scottish Premiership	4	0	0	0	1	0	—		5	0
Ross County	2017–18	Scottish Premiership	14	0	1	0	1	0	—		16	0
Ross County	Total		18	0	1	0	2	0	0	0	21	0
Warrenpoint Town	2018–19	NIFL Premiership	16	0	0	0	1	0	—		17	0
Dundalk	2019	League of Ireland Premier Division	1	0	0	0	4	0	1 (Note: Appearance in Leinster Senior Cup)	0	6	0
Dundalk	2020	League of Ireland Premier Division	5	0	0	0	0	0	1 (Note: Appearance in 2020–21 UEFA Europa League group stage)	0	6	0
Dundalk	Total		6	0	0	0	4	0	2	0	12	0
Career total			96	0	5	0	6	0	3	0	115	0
