= Kenny van der Weg =

Dutch footballer

Personal information
- Full name: Kenny van der Weg
- Date of birth: 19 February 1991 (age 35)
- Place of birth: Rotterdam, Netherlands
- Height: 1.84 m (6 ft 0 in)
- Position: Left back

Youth career
- 1998–2006: Spartaan '20
- 2006–2012: NAC Breda

Senior career*
Years	Team	Apps	(Gls)
2012–2016	NAC Breda	92	(6)
2016–2018	Ross County	52	(2)
2018	Hamilton Academical	11	(0)
2018–2019	Roeselare	5	(0)
2019	Ross County	12	(0)
2019	Aalesund	0	(0)
2020	TOP Oss	0	(0)
2021	RBC Roosendaal		
Total		172	(8)
- * Club domestic league appearances and goals

Kenny van der Weg (born 19 February 1991) is a Dutch former professional footballer who plays as a left back.

== Career ==
Van der Weg has previously played for NAC Breda in the Dutch leagues, and for Ross County in the Scottish Premiership. Ross County released him from his contract on 31 January 2018, and he signed with Hamilton Academical on 12 February.

He signed for Belgian club Roeselare in June 2018. After six months in Belgium, van der Weg returned to Ross County in January 2019, but left seven months later to return to the Netherlands to be with his family. On 11 September 2019 he signed for Norwegian side Aalesund. Without even practicing with the club, his contract was terminated in mid-November 2019. On 30 January 2020, he joined TOP Oss, but left the club again at the end of the season as a free agent, without having made any appearances.

== Career statistics ==
As of match played 5 December 2020

Appearances and goals by club, season and competition
Club	Season	League			National Cup		League Cup		Other		Total	
Club	Season	Division	Apps	Goals	Apps	Goals	Apps	Goals	Apps	Goals	Apps	Goals
NAC Breda	2011–12	Eredivisie	0	0	0	0	—		—		0	0
NAC Breda	2012–13	Eredivisie	15	1	1	0	—		—		16	1
NAC Breda	2013–14	Eredivisie	22	1	2	0	—		—		24	1
NAC Breda	2014–15	Eredivisie	24	1	3	0	—		—		27	1
NAC Breda	2015–16	Eerste Divisie	31	3	0	0	—		2 (Note: Appearances in the Eredivisie promotion/relegation play-offs)	0	33	3
NAC Breda	Total		92	6	6	0	0	0	2	0	100	6
Ross County	2016–17	Scottish Premiership	33	0	2	0	3	0	—		38	0
Ross County	2017–18	Scottish Premiership	19	2	1	0	1	0	—		21	2
Ross County	Total		52	2	3	0	4	0	0	0	59	2
Hamilton Academical	2017–18	Scottish Premiership	11	0	0	0	0	0	—		11	0
Roeselare	2018–19	Belgian First Division B	5	0	1	1	—		—		6	1
Ross County	2018–19	Scottish Championship	12	0	3	0	0	0	2 (Note: Appearances in the Scottish Challenge Cup)	0	17	0
Aalesunds	2019	1. divisjon	0	0	0	0	—		—		0	0
TOP Oss	2019–20	Eerste Divisie	0	0	0	0	—		—		0	0
Career total			172	8	13	1	4	0	4	0	193	9

== Honours ==
Ross County

- Scottish Championship: 2018–19
- Scottish Challenge Cup: 2018–19
