= Jim O'Brien (footballer, born 1987) =

Association football player

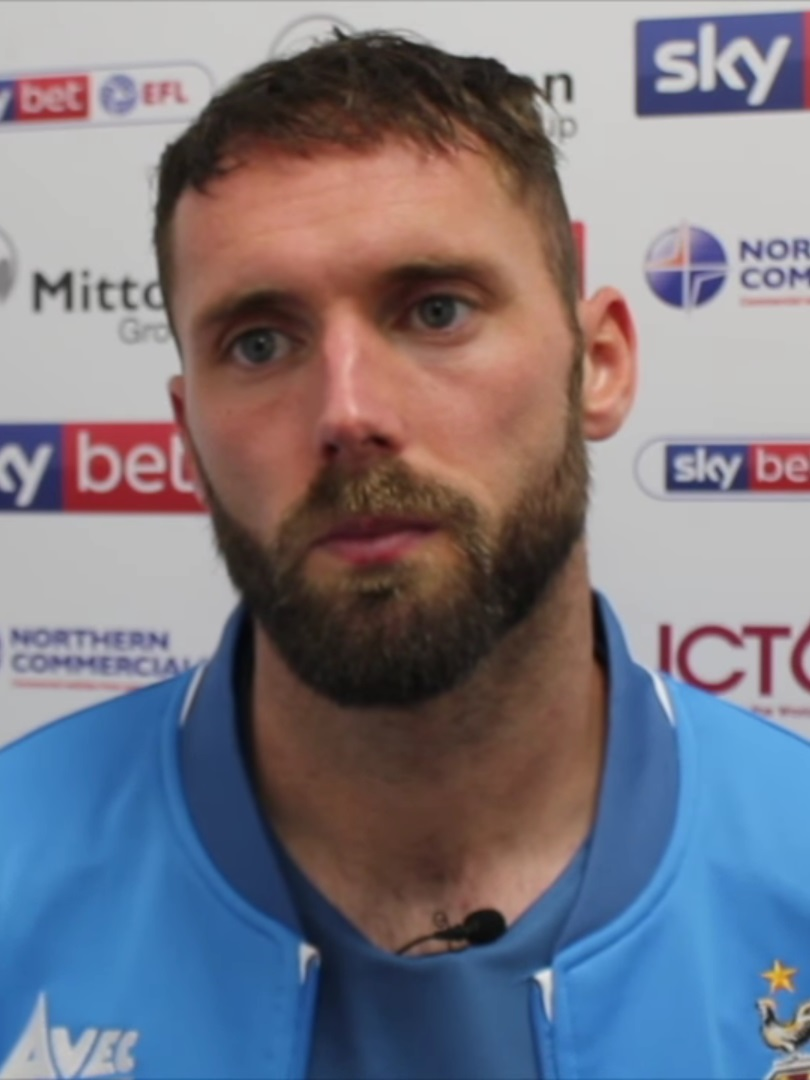
- O'Brien with Bradford City in 2018

Personal information
- Full name: James John O'Brien
- Date of birth: 28 September 1987 (age 39)
- Place of birth: Govan, Glasgow, Scotland
- Position: Central midfielder

Youth career
- Bellsmyre Boys Club
- Dumbarton United
- 2000–2006: Celtic

Senior career*
Years	Team	Apps	(Gls)
2006–2008	Celtic	1	(0)
2007	→ Dunfermline Athletic (loan)	13	(1)
2008	→ Dundee United (loan)	10	(0)
2008–2010	Motherwell	64	(4)
2010–2014	Barnsley	123	(7)
2014–2016	Coventry City	70	(8)
2016	→ Scunthorpe United (loan)	9	(1)
2016–2017	Shrewsbury Town	18	(0)
2017	→ Ross County (loan)	16	(1)
2017–2018	Ross County	25	(0)
2018–2019	Bradford City	11	(0)
2019–2024	Notts County	157	(16)

International career
2005	Republic of Ireland U19	1	(0)
2006–2008	Republic of Ireland U21	6	(0)

Managerial career
- 2024: Notts County (caretaker)
- * Club domestic league appearances and goals as of 20:43, 7 April 2024 (UTC)

James John O'Brien (born 28 September 1987) is a professional footballer who most recently played as a central midfielder for Notts County. His previous clubs include Motherwell and Ross County in Scotland, and Barnsley and Coventry City in England.

Born in Scotland, he represented Ireland at youth international level.

== Club career ==
=== Celtic and loans ===
Raised in Dumbarton, O'Brien began his career in the youth system at Celtic. He was loaned out to Dunfermline Athletic during the 2006–07 season. He made his debut in their 3–2 Scottish Cup victory over Rangers on 7 January 2007. He scored his first goal in Dunfermline's 4–1 victory over Motherwell on 7 May 2007.

He made his debut Celtic in a 2–1 victory over Gretna on 7 October 2007; he filled in as a right-back due to all of Celtic's recognised players in that position being injured.

O'Brien joined Dundee United on loan on 31 January until May 2008.

=== Motherwell ===
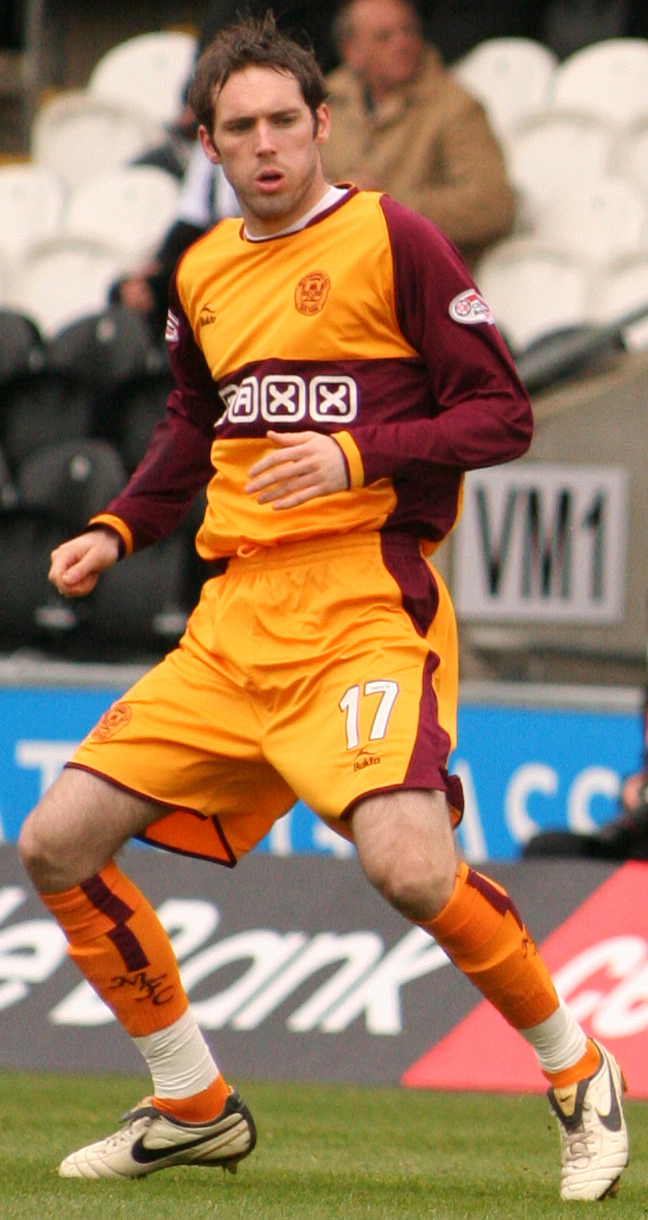
O'Brien playing for Motherwell in

On 8 August 2008, O'Brien signed for Motherwell. He scored four goals in 64 league appearances for Motherwell, earning selection for the PFA Scotland team of the year in 2009–10.

=== Barnsley ===
On 7 May 2010, O'Brien signed a pre-contract agreement with English Championship side Barnsley, then under the stewardship of Mark Robins. He scored his first goal for the club during a 5–2 win againstLeeds United at Oakwell in September 2010. As of 5 April 2013, O'Brien had scored five and assisted eight goals for Barnsley. In May 2014, O'Brien rejected a new contract offer from Barnsley.

=== Coventry City ===
O'Brien completed a move to Coventry City on a two-year contract on 4 July 2014. He made his league debut on the opening day of the 2014–15 season in a 3–2 defeat to Bradford City. He scored a disputed first goal for the club against Sheffield United at Sixfields Stadium (later credited as an own goal by Blades defender Bob Harris). His second goal for the club was less disputable as he scored from close-range to make the score 2–2 against Peterborough United at the Ricoh Arena on 25 October 2014; the Sky Blues went on to win the game 3–2.

On 15 February 2016, O'Brien was loaned out to Scunthorpe United on an emergency basis.

=== Shrewsbury Town and Ross County ===
On 17 June 2016, O'Brien completed a move to League One side Shrewsbury Town. He signed a two-year deal arriving as a free agent following his release from Coventry. A first-team regular during the first half of the season, he scored his first goal for the club in an FA Cup second-round replay against Fleetwood Town.

On 18 January 2017, O'Brien joined Scottish Premiership side Ross County on loan from Shrewsbury until the end of the 2016–17 season. He made his debut for the club as a substitute in a Scottish Cup fourth-round tie against Dundee United, scoring the final goal in a 6–2 victory.

He left Shrewsbury by mutual consent in July 2017, despite having a year left to run on his contract. then signed a two-year contract with Ross County.

=== Bradford City and Notts County ===
In September 2018 he signed a short-term contract with Bradford City. He left the club in January 2019.

On 8 January 2019, O'Brien signed for Notts County the same day he was released by Bradford City. He was released at the end of the 2018–19 season, but rejoined the club on 1 August 2019.

On 11 May 2021, O'Brien scored his first career hat-trick in Notts County's 4–0 win away at Maidenhead United. He scored his second career hat-trick on 22 April 2023 in a 5–2 victory at Maidstone United.

Following manager Luke Williams departure to Swansea City, Jim O'Brien was placed in interim charge of Notts County. He oversaw one match in charge, a 5–5 draw with Grimsby Town, before the appointment of Stuart Maynard saw him return to his previous role. He was released by the club after the conclusion of the 2023–2024 season.

== Managerial career ==
On 9 August 2024 O'Brien was appointed Head Coach of Sheffield United's under-18 side after Matt Thorpe departed the role.

== International career ==
Although O'Brien represented the Republic of Ireland at under-19 and under-21 levels, he opted to switch allegiances and represent the nation of his birth, citing a chance to work with Craig Levein, who he also worked with while at Dundee United.

== Career statistics ==
As of match played 12 May 2018

Appearances and goals by club, season and competition
Club	Season	League			National Cup		League Cup		Other		Total	
Club	Season	Division	Apps	Goals	Apps	Goals	Apps	Goals	Apps	Goals	Apps	Goals
Celtic	2006–07	Scottish Premier League	0	0	0	0	0	0	0	0	0	0
Celtic	2007–08	Scottish Premier League	1	0	1	0	0	0	0	0	2	0
Celtic	Total		1	0	1	0	0	0	0	0	2	0
Dunfermline Athletic (loan)	2006–07	Scottish Premier League	13	1	5	0	0	0	0	0	18	1
Dundee United (loan)	2007–08	Scottish Premier League	10	0	0	0	0	0	0	0	10	0
Motherwell	2008–09	Scottish Premier League	29	1	3	0	0	0	0	0	32	1
Motherwell	2009–10	Scottish Premier League	35	3	1	0	2	0	2 (Note: Appearances in UEFA Europa League)	0	40	3
Motherwell	Total		64	4	4	0	2	0	2	0	72	4
Barnsley	2010–11	Championship	33	1	1	0	0	0	0	0	34	1
Barnsley	2011–12	Championship	31	2	0	0	1	0	0	0	32	2
Barnsley	2012–13	Championship	30	2	4	0	1	0	0	0	35	2
Barnsley	2013–14	Championship	29	2	1	1	2	0	0	0	32	3
Barnsley	Total		123	7	6	1	4	0	0	0	133	8
Coventry City	2014–15	League One	44	6	1	0	1	0	2 (Note: Appearances in Football League Trophy)	0	48	6
Coventry City	2015–16	League One	26	2	1	0	1	0	1	0	29	2
Coventry City	Total		70	8	2	0	2	0	3	0	77	8
Scunthorpe United (loan)	2015–16	League One	9	1	0	0	0	0	0	0	9	1
Shrewsbury Town	2016–17	League One	18	0	3	1	2	0	2	0	25	1
Ross County (loan)	2016–17	Scottish Premiership	16	0	2	1	0	0	0	0	18	1
Ross County	2017–18	Scottish Premiership	25	0	1	0	3	0	0	0	29	0
Career total			349	21	24	3	13	0	7	0	392	24

== Honours ==
Notts County

- National League play-offs: 2023
