= Christopher Routis =

French footballer (born 1990)

Personal information
- Full name: Christopher Pascal Routis
- Date of birth: 3 March 1990 (age 36)
- Place of birth: Bordeaux, France
- Height: 1.86 m (6 ft 1 in)
- Positions: Defender; midfielder

Team information
- Current team: Servette II
- Number: 27

Youth career
- –2010: Servette

Senior career*
Years	Team	Apps	(Gls)
2010–2014	Servette	87	(5)
2014–2016	Bradford City	29	(2)
2016–2018	Ross County	56	(5)
2018–2020	Servette	47	(1)
2020–2022	Stade Lausanne	39	(0)
2022–	Servette II	3	(0)
- * Club domestic league appearances and goals as of 2 October 2022

Christopher Pascal Routis (born 3 March 1990) is a French professional footballer who plays as a midfielder for Swiss club Servette II. Routis has previously played for Bradford City and Ross County.

== Career ==
=== Servette ===
Born in Bordeaux, Routis started his career at Swiss club Servette, playing for them between 2010 and 2014.

Routis made his Servette debut on 7 November 2010, in a 3–1 Challenge League home victory against Yverdon Sport FC. The following season, Routis scored his first goal for Servette in their first game back in the Swiss Super League, a 1–2 home defeat against FC Thun on 17 July 2011.

=== Bradford City ===
On 8 August 2014, it was announced that Routis would sign for Bradford City on a one-year contract. On 2 September 2014, he made his Bradford debut in the Football League Trophy in a 1–0 defeat against Oldham Athletic. He made his league debut two weeks later against Milton Keynes Dons. He made his home debut on 27 September in a 1–1 draw against Port Vale. He scored his first goal for the club on 21 October 2014, scoring in a 2–2 draw against Bristol City. He scored his second goal for the club in a 2–2 draw against Fleetwood Town on 21 March 2015. During his initial season with the club he played in a number of positions, including in midfield. He also adjusted to a language barrier. He signed a new one-year deal with the club in May 2015 after they exercised an option in his contract.

=== Ross County ===
Routis signed for Scottish Premiership club Ross County in May 2016. He made his league debut for the club on 6 August 2016 in a 3–1 home defeat to Dundee F.C. He scored his first league goal for the club on 19 November 2016 in a 4–2 away victory over St Johnstone. His goal, scored in the 38th minute, made the score 2–0 to Ross County. He left the club in May 2018, after they had been relegated from the Premiership.

=== Servette (2nd spell) ===
Routis returned to Servette after being released by Ross County in the summer of 2018.

=== Servette (3rd spell) ===
On 20 July 2022, Routis returned to Servette once again, this time joining the club's Under-21 second team that plays in the fourth-tier Swiss 1. Liga.

== Career statistics ==
As of match played 6 April 2021

Appearances and goals by club, season and competition
Club	Season	League			National Cup		League Cup		Other		Total	
Club	Season	Division	Apps	Goals	Apps	Goals	Apps	Goals	Apps	Goals	Apps	Goals
Servette	2010–11	Swiss Challenge League	12	1	1	0	—		2 (Note: Appearances in the Swiss Super League play-offs)	0	15	1
Servette	2011–12	Swiss Super League	31	3	1	0	—		—		32	3
Servette	2012–13	Swiss Super League	22	0	0	0	—		0	0	22	0
Servette	2013–14	Swiss Challenge League	22	1	1	0	—		—		23	1
Servette	Total		87	5	3	0	—		2	0	92	5
Bradford City	2014–15	League One	18	2	3	0	1	0	1 (Note: Appearances in the Football League Trophy)	0	23	2
Bradford City	2015–16	League One	11	0	3	0	1	0	1	0	16	0
Bradford City	Total		29	2	6	0	2	0	2	0	39	2
Ross County	2016–17	Scottish Premiership	30	3	1	2	3	0	—		34	5
Ross County	2017–18	Scottish Premiership	26	2	1	0	5	0	—		32	2
Ross County	Total		56	5	2	2	8	0	0	0	66	7
Servette	2018–19	Swiss Challenge League	29	1	2	1	—		—		31	2
Servette	2019–20	Swiss Super League	18	0	0	0	—		—		18	0
Servette	Total		47	1	2	1	0	0	0	0	49	2
Stade Lausanne	2020–21	Swiss Challenge League	20	0	1	0	—		—		21	0
Career total			239	13	14	3	10	0	4	0	267	16

== Honours ==
Servette

- Swiss Challenge League: 2018–19
