= 2016–17 SPFL Development League =

Season of Scottish youth association football

SPFL Development League
- Season: 2016–17
- Champions: Ross County
- Top goalscorer: Oli Shaw (Hibernian)

The 2016–17 SPFL Development League was the 19th season of the highest youth Scottish football league and the third season under the "Development League" format. It began in August 2016 and ended in May 2017.

== Changes ==
The league remained at 17 teams. All twelve 2016–17 Scottish Premiership clubs participated in the league, with Dundee United, Dunfermline Athletic, Falkirk, Hibernian and St Mirren making up the numbers. Eligible players were those born in 1997 or later, but five players of any age were permitted in the matchday squad of 18.

== League table ==
Pos	Team	Pld	W	D	L	GF	GA	GD	Pts	Promotion, qualification or relegation
1	Ross County (C)	32	20	6	6	63	40	+23	66	League winners
2	Hamilton Academical	32	19	7	6	72	39	+33	64	
3	Celtic	32	19	6	7	61	26	+35	63	
4	Hibernian	32	19	4	9	67	43	+24	61	
5	Motherwell	32	17	6	9	66	39	+27	57	
6	Rangers	32	15	6	11	53	47	+6	51	
7	Falkirk	32	14	7	11	57	52	+5	49	
8	Partick Thistle	32	15	3	14	61	64	−3	48	
9	Aberdeen	32	14	4	14	56	58	−2	46	
10	Dunfermline Athletic	32	13	5	14	45	53	−8	44	
11	Heart of Midlothian	32	12	7	13	48	46	+2	43	
12	Kilmarnock	32	9	5	18	51	68	−17	32	
13	St Mirren	32	9	4	19	46	70	−24	31	
14	Dundee United	32	7	9	16	49	66	−17	30	
15	Dundee	32	7	7	18	32	57	−25	28	
16	Inverness Caledonian Thistle	32	7	6	19	32	66	−34	27	
17	St Johnstone	32	5	10	17	34	59	−25	25	

Updated to match(es) played on 5 May 2017. Source: SPFL
Rules for classification: 1) Points; 2) Goal difference; 3) Number of goals scored
(C) Champions

== Matches ==
Teams played each other twice, once at home, once away.

Home \ Away	ABE	CEL	DND	DUN	DNF	FAL	HAM	HOM	HIB	INV	KIL	MOT	PAR	RAN	ROS	STJ	STM
Aberdeen		1–0	2–2	0–3	4–0	2–0	4–1	1–3	2–1	3–0	4–2	1–9	1–2	1–1	0–1	2–0	1–2
Celtic	4–0		1–0	1–0	0–3	0–0	2–2	3–1	3–0	4–1	2–2	3–2	5–2	4–0	0–1	1–1	2–0
Dundee	0–2	0–1		3–3	2–0	0–0	0–2	1–2	2–2	0–1	1–1	0–0	1–2	0–5	0–1	1–0	0–3
Dundee United	3–2	0–6	0–3		2–2	1–1	2–2	2–2	1–2	3–1	2–0	0–3	1–2	4–0	2–2	1–1	4–1
Dunfermline Athletic	1–0	0–1	1–0	1–0		0–2	1–4	2–3	0–3	1–1	1–1	0–3	0–1	1–0	4–0	2–1	5–1
Falkirk	1–4	0–4	3–0	5–1	2–1		1–2	1–1	1–4	2–3	4–1	3–1	3–1	1–3	3–2	2–2	3–2
Hamilton Academical	3–2	0–0	4–0	3–1	3–0	2–2		1–0	0–2	5–0	3–0	1–2	2–1	1–0	1–2	2–2	3–1
Heart of Midlothian	0–2	1–0	2–1	1–1	1–1	3–1	3–0		3–1	3–1	0–1	0–3	5–1	1–2	0–2	3–0	1–2
Hibernian	4–1	2–1	4–1	1–0	3–0	3–3	0–3	2–2		1–0	1–4	3–1	4–0	1–2	0–2	5–0	3–2
Inverness Caledonian Thistle	0–2	0–1	1–2	1–1	1–0	0–3	0–3	2–2	2–2		3–1	1–3	1–3	2–1	2–2	2–1	1–0
Kilmarnock	4–1	3–4	2–4	3–4	1–2	1–2	0–4	1–0	1–2	2–0		1–0	1–3	4–2	4–1	1–1	1–1
Motherwell	2–2	1–0	0–0	3–0	4–0	3–2	4–3	0–1	0–3	3–0	1–0		3–6	2–1	1–1	3–1	4–0
Partick Thistle	2–1	1–0	3–0	4–2	1–3	2–1	3–3	3–1	0–3	2–2	5–0	1–2		2–3	2–6	2–3	1–0
Rangers	2–2	0–1	3–0	2–1	3–3	1–2	2–2	2–1	2–1	2–1	1–0	2–1	0–0		1–1	1–2	0–1
Ross County	2–1	1–1	4–1	3–1	2–4	2–0	1–2	4–1	2–0	1–0	2–1	1–0	4–2	2–3		2–2	1–0
St Johnstone	1–2	0–2	1–3	3–2	1–2	0–1	0–2	0–0	1–2	2–0	3–4	1–1	1–0	0–3	0–2		2–2
St Mirren	2–3	1–4	1–4	2–1	2–4	0–2	1–3	2–1	1–2	5–2	4–3	1–1	2–1	2–3	1–3	1–1	

Updated to match(es) played on 5 May 2017. Source: SPFL
Legend: Blue = home team win; Yellow = draw; Red = away team win.

The result of a match between Dunfermline and Motherwell on 21 February was annulled, and a 3–0 win awarded to Motherwell, because Dunfermline fielded a player who was under suspension from the Scottish Football Association.

== Top scorers ==
As of matches played on 27 April 2017

Rank	Player	Club	Goals
1	(Scotland) Oli Shaw	Hibernian	26
2	(Scotland) Ryan Tierney	Hamilton Academical	19
3	(Scotland) Neil McLaughlin	Partick Thistle	17
4	(Scotland) Scott Shepherd	Falkirk	15
5	(Scotland) Greg Morrison	Ross County	14
