= 2008–09 Airdrie United F.C. season =

Airdrie United
2008–09 season
- Chairman: Jim Ballantyne
- Manager: Kenny Black
- Stadium: Excelsior Stadium
- Scottish First Division: Ninth place
- Scottish Cup: Fifth round
- League Cup: Third round
- Challenge Cup: Winners
- Top goalscorer: League: Simon Lynch (10); All: Simon Lynch (14)

In association football, season 2008–09 was Airdrie United's seventh competitive season. They competed in the First Division, Challenge Cup, League Cup, and the Scottish Cup.

== Summary ==
Airdrie United finished ninth in the First Division, entering the play-offs losing 3–2 to Ayr United on aggregate. Despite losing in the playoff, they regained their first division status due to Livingston's forced relegation due to going into administration. They reached the fifth round of the Scottish Cup, the third round of the League Cup, and clinched the Challenge Cup beating Ross County in the final.

== League table ==
| Pos | Team | Pld | W | D | L | GF | GA | GD | Pts | Promotion, qualification or relegation |
|---|---|---|---|---|---|---|---|---|---|---|
| 6 | Greenock Morton | 36 | 12 | 11 | 13 | 40 | 40 | 0 | 47 | |
| 7 | Livingston (R) | 36 | 13 | 8 | 15 | 56 | 58 | −2 | 47 (Note: Demoted to 3rd Division for Financial Irregularities) | Relegation to the Third Division |
| 8 | Ross County | 36 | 13 | 8 | 15 | 42 | 46 | −4 | 47 | |
| 9 | Airdrie United | 36 | 10 | 12 | 14 | 29 | 43 | −14 | 42 (Note: Spared Relegation as Losing Finalist in the playoff due to Livingston) | Qualification for the First Division Play-offs (Note: The 9th placed team will be entered into a play-off with the Second Division's 2nd, 3rd and 4th placed teams. The winning team will be awarded a place in the 2009–10 First Division.) |
| 10 | Clyde (R) | 36 | 10 | 9 | 17 | 41 | 58 | −17 | 39 | Relegation to the Second Division |

Source: BBC Sport
Rules for classification: 1) points; 2) goal difference; 3) number of goals scored.
(R) Relegated

== Results and fixtures ==
Win Draw Loss

=== First Division ===
| 2 August 2008 SFL1 | Queen of the South | 0–0 | Airdrie United | Palmerston Park |
| | | BBC Report | | Attendance: 2,914; Referee: Richmond |

| 9 August 2008 SFL1 | Airdrie United | 0–1 | Partick Thistle | Excelsior Stadium |
| | | BBC Report | Gray 74' | Attendance: 2,165; Referee: Collum |

| 16 August 2008 SFL1 | Airdrie United | 0–0 | Dundee | Excelsior Stadium |
| | | BBC Report | | Attendance: 1,787; Referee: Finnie |

| 23 August 2008 SFL1 | Dunfermline Athletic | 0–0 | Airdrie United | East End Park |
| | | BBC Report | | Attendance: 3,334; Referee: Charleston |

| 30 August 2008 SFL1 | Airdrie United | 5–0 | Greenock Morton | Excelsior Stadium |
| | McLaughlin 13', 26'; Di Giacomo 36'; Nixon 58'; Lynch 63' | BBC Report | | Attendance: 1,793; Referee: Muir |

| 13 September 2008 SFL1 | Livingston | 1–2 | Airdrie United | Almondvale Stadium |
| | Elliot 90' | BBC Report | Lynch 34'; McLaughlin 64' | Attendance: 1,710; Referee: Smith |

| 19 September 2008 SFL1 | Airdrie United | 0–2 | Clyde | Excelsior Stadium |
| | | BBC Report | Waddell 27'; Brown 59' | Attendance: 1,489; Referee: Winter |

| 27 September 2008 SFL1 | Ross County | 2–0 | Airdrie United | Victoria Park |
| | Smyth 10' (Own Goal); Craig 77' | BBC Report | | Attendance: 2,259; Referee: McKendrick |

| 4 October 2008 SFL1 | St Johnstone | 3–1 | Airdrie United | McDiarmid Park |
| | Swankie 4'; Milne 56', 90' | BBC Report | Nixon 48' | Attendance: 2,259; Referee: McDonald |

| 18 October 2008 SFL1 | Airdrie United | 2–0 | Queen of the South | Excelsior Stadium |
| | Cardle 7'; Lynch 44' | BBC Report | | Attendance: 1,524; Referee: McCurry |

| 1 November 2008 SFL1 | Dundee | 1–1 | Airdrie United | Dens Park |
| | Antoine-Curier 66' | BBC Report | Lynch 11' | Attendance: 3,456; Referee: Boyle |

| 4 November 2008 SFL1 | Airdrie United | 1–3 | Dunfermline Athletic | Excelsior Stadium |
| | Di Giacomo 9' | BBC Report | Woods 4'; Glass 29'; Phinn 55' | Attendance: 1,099; Referee: Collum |

| 8 November 2008 SFL1 | Airdrie United | 0–0 | Livingston | Excelsior Stadium |
| | | BBC Report | | Attendance: 1,201; Referee: Conroy |

| 21 November 2008 SFL1 | Airdrie United | 0–2 | Ross County | Excelsior Stadium |
| | | BBC Report | Higgins 33'; Brittain 67' | Attendance: 939; Referee: Muir |

| 25 November 2008 SFL1 | Greenock Morton | 2–0 | Airdrie United | Cappielow Park |
| | Wake 34'; Jenkins 90' | BBC Report | | Attendance: 1,642; Referee: Allan |

| 13 December 2008 SFL1 | Partick Thistle | 2–1 | Airdrie United | Fir Park |
| | Harkins 19'; McLaughlin 61' (Own Goal) | BBC Report | Lynch 13' | Attendance: 2,296; Referee: McCurry |

| 16 December 2008 SFL1 | Clyde | 1–0 | Airdrie United | Broadwood Stadium |
| | Trouten 74' | BBC Report | | Attendance: 864; Referee: Boyle |

| 20 December 2008 SFL1 | Airdrie United | 1–1 | St Johnstone | Excelsior Stadium |
| | Maguire 89' | BBC Report | Craig 80' (pen.) | Attendance: 1,175; Referee: Norris |

| 27 December 2008 SFL1 | Airdrie United | 1–0 | Greenock Morton | Excelsior Stadium |
| | Lynch 45' (pen.) | BBC Report | | Attendance: 1,663; Referee: Murray |

| 3 January 2009 SFL1 | Livingston | 1–1 | Airdrie United | Almondvale Stadium |
| | Elliot 86' | BBC Report | Lynch 68' | Attendance: 1,462; Referee: O'Reilly |

| 17 January 2009 SFL1 | Dunfermline Athletic | 1–1 | Airdrie United | East End Park |
| | Loy 49' | BBC Report | Lynch 15' | Attendance: 2,915; Referee: Somers |

| 24 January 2009 SFL1 | Airdrie United | 1–0 | Dundee | Excelsior Stadium |
| | Di Giacomo 68' | BBC Report | | Attendance: 1,303; Referee: Winter |

| 31 January 2009 SFL1 | Airdrie United | 0–1 | Partick Thistle | Excelsior Stadium |
| | | BBC Report | Buchanan 43' | Attendance: 1,988; Referee: MacDonald |

| 14 February 2009 SFL1 | Queen of the South | 4–0 | Airdrie United | Palmerston Park |
| | Dobbie 35' (pen.), 67'; Harris 52'; Weatherston 84' | BBC Report | | Attendance: 2,443; Referee: Muir |

| 22 February 2009 SFL1 | Airdrie United | 1–0 | Clyde | Excelsior Stadium |
| | Di Giacomo 4' | BBC Report | | Attendance: 1,189; Referee: McDonald |

| 28 February 2009 SFL1 | Ross County | 0–0 | Airdrie United | Victoria Park |
| | | BBC Report | | Attendance: 2,290; Referee: MacKay |

| 7 March 2009 SFL1 | Airdrie United | 4–4 | Livingston | Excelsior Stadium |
| | Baird 8' (64); Di Giacomo 54'; Cardle (red card) 60'; Smyth 66' | BBC Report | Griffiths 42' (57); One 43' (51) | Attendance: 1,100; Referee: Nicholls |

| 10 March 2009 SFL1 | Greenock Morton | 0–0 | Airdrie United | Cappielow |
| | | BBC Report | | Attendance: 1,865; Referee: Norris |

| 14 March 2009 SFL1 | Airdrie United | 2–0 | Queen of the South | Excelsior Stadium |
| | Smyth 50'; McLaughlin 58' | | | Attendance: 1,320; Referee: Thomson |

| 21 March 2009 SFL1 | St Johnstone | 3–0 | Airdrie United | McDiarmid Park |
| | Samuel 13', 36'; Sheerin 90' | BBC Report | | Attendance: 2,561; Referee: Winter |

| 4 April 2009 SFL1 | Airdrie United | 1–1 | Dunfermline Athletic | Excelsior Stadium |
| | Smith 83' | BBC Report | Ross 90' | Attendance: 1,136; Referee: Richmond |

| 11 April 2009 SFL1 | Dundee | 0–1 | Airdrie United | Dens Park |
| | | BBC Report | Lynch 18' | Attendance: 2,870; Referee: Boyle |

| 18 April 2009 SFL1 | Clyde | 3–0 | Airdrie United | Broadwood Stadium |
| | Waddell 5'; MacLennan 61', 74' | BBC Report | | Attendance: 1,614; Referee: McLean |

| 25 April 2009 SFL1 | Airdrie United | 1–0 | Ross County | Excelsior Stadium |
| | McKenna 65' | BBC Report | | Attendance: 927; Referee: Conroy |

| 2 May 2009 SFL1 | Partick Thistle | 0–1 | Airdrie United | Fir Park |
| | | BBC Report | Lynch 90' | Attendance: 3,255; Referee: Allan |

| 11 May 2009 SFL1 | Airdrie United | 0–4 | St Johnstone | Excelsior Stadium |
| | | BBC Report | Swankie 49'; Anderson 80'; May 86'; Barrett 90' | Attendance: 633; Referee: Law |

=== First Division play-offs ===
| 14 May 2009 Play-offs SF R1 | Peterhead | 0–2 | Airdrie United | Balmoor |
| 19:45 | | Report | Baird 9'; McLaughlin 47' | Attendance: 1,364; Referee: C MacKay |

| 17 May 2008 Play-offs SF R2 | Airdrie United | 2–1 | Peterhead | Excelsior Stadium |
| 15:00 | Smyth 61'; Baird 85' | Report | McKay 45' | Attendance: 1,008; Referee: Finnie |

| 20 May 2009 Play-offs Final R1 | Ayr United | 2–2 | Airdrie United | Somerset Park |
| 19:45 | Roberts 48' 67' | Report | di Giacomo 30'; Baird 43' | Attendance: 3,378; Referee: Smith |

| 24 May 2009 Play-offs Final R2 | Airdrie United | 0–1 | Ayr United | Excelsior Stadium |
| 15:15 | | Report | Stevenson 29' | Attendance: 3,303; Referee: I Brines |

=== Challenge Cup ===
| 26 July 2008 Challenge Cup R1 | Airdrie United | 3–2 | Dumbarton | Excelsior Stadium |
| 15:00 | Noble 53'; Cardle 58' di Giacomo 75' | BBC Sport | Clark 25'; Carcary 43' | Attendance: 808; Referee: Murray |

| 13 August 2008 Challenge Cup R2 | East Fife | 0–2 | Airdrie United | Bayview Stadium |
| 19:45 | | BBC Sport | Lynch 10'; Smith 84' | Attendance: 606; Referee: Tumilty |

| 7 September 2008 Challenge Cup QF | Cowdenbeath | 1–2 | Airdrie United | Central Park |
| 15:00 | Fairbairn 79'; Baxter (red card) 84' | Report | di Giacomo 53' 75' | Attendance: 643; Referee: Finnie |

| 12 October 2008 Challenge Cup SF | Partick Thistle | 0–1 | Airdrie United | Firhill Stadium |
| 14:00 | | Report | di Giacomo 4' | Attendance: 2,761; Referee: Somers |

| 16 November 2008 Challenge Cup Final | Airdrie United | 2–2 (a.e.t.) (3 – 2 p) | Ross County | McDiarmid Park |
| 15:00 | McKenna 80'; Dowie 103' (o.g.) | Report | Nixon 59' (o.g.); Higgins 113' | Attendance: 4,091; Referee: Murray |
| | Penalties |
| | Lynch (penalty missed); McLaughlin (penalty scored); Hazley (penalty missed); McDonald (penalty scored); Smyth (penalty scored) | | (penalty missed) Winters; (penalty scored) Higgins; (penalty scored) Hart; (penalty missed) Morrison; (penalty missed) Scott |

=== League Cup ===
| 5 August 2008 League Cup R1 | Ross County | 2–3 (a.e.t.) | Airdrie United | Victoria Park |
| 19:45 | Dall 43'; Hart 76' | BBC Sport | di Giacomo 23' 112'; Noble 86' | Attendance: 869; Referee: Allan |

| 27 August 2008 League Cup R2 | Heart of Midlothian | 2–3 (a.e.t.) (3 – 4 p) | Airdrie United | Tynecastle Stadium |
| 19:45 | | BBC Sport | McDonald (yellow card) 107' (red card) | Attendance: 6,844; Referee: Smith |

| 23 September 2008 League Cup R3 | Dundee United | 2–0 | Airdrie United | Tannadice Park |
| 19:45 | Goodwillie 33'; Robertson 42' | BBC Sport | | Attendance: 3,444; Referee: Tumilty |

=== Scottish Cup ===
| 29 November 2008 Scottish Cup R3 | Airdrie United | 3–0 | Cove Rangers | Excelsior Stadium |
| 15:00 | Cardle 20'; Lynch 38' 41' | BBC Sport | | Attendance: 821; Referee: Salmond |

| 10 January 2009 Scottish Cup R4 | Airdrie United | 2–1 | Spartans | Excelsior Stadium |
| 15:00 | di Giacomo 26'; Lynch 43' | BBC Sport | Malin 54' | Attendance: 1,460; Referee: Muir |

| 17 February 2009 Scottish Cup R5 | Airdrie United | 1–2 | Dunfermline Athletic | Excelsior Stadium |
| 19:45 | McLaughlin 14' (pen.) | BBC Sport | Holmes 2'; Bayne 73' | Attendance: 1,772; Referee: Murray |

== Player statistics ==
=== Squad ===
| No. | Pos | Nat | Player | Total | | First Division | | Scottish Cup | | League Cup | | Other^{[a]} | | |
| No. | Pos | Nat | Player | Apps | Goals | Apps | Goals | Apps | Goals | Apps | Goals | Apps | Goals | |
|---|---|---|---|---|---|---|---|---|---|---|---|---|---|---|
| | GK | (Scotland) SCO | Stephen Robertson | 48 | 0 | 33 | 0 | 3 | 0 | 3 | 0 | 9 | 0 | |
| | GK | (Scotland) SCO | Lee Hollis | 3 | 0 | 3 | 0 | 0 | 0 | 0 | 0 | 0 | 0 | |
| | DF | (Scotland) SCO | Stephen McKenna | 49 | 2 | 35 | 1 | 3 | 0 | 3 | 0 | 8 | 1 | |
| | DF | (Northern Ireland) NIR | Matt Hazley | 27 | 0 | 19 | 0 | 3 | 0 | 2 | 0 | 3 | 0 | |
| | DF | (Scotland) SCO | David Nixon | 43 | 2 | 32 | 2 | 1 | 0 | 3 | 0 | 7 | 0 | |
| | DF | (Scotland) SCO | William McLachlan | 23 | 0 | 18 | 0 | 1 | 0 | 0 | 0 | 4 | 0 | |
| | DF | (Scotland) SCO | Bobby Donnelly | 36 | 9 | 31 | 0 | 2 | 0 | 3 | 0 | 0 | 9 | 0 |
| | DF | (Scotland) SCO | Jamie Bain | 1 | 0 | 1 | 0 | 0 | 0 | 0 | 0 | 0 | 0 | |
| | DF | (Scotland) SCO | Liam Sloan | 1 | 0 | 1 | 0 | 0 | 0 | 0 | 0 | 0 | 0 | |
| | DF | (Scotland) SCO | Paul Lovering | 18 | 0 | 11 | 0 | 0 | 0 | 0 | 0 | 7 | 0 | |
| | DF | (Scotland) SCO | Marc Smyth | 46 | 3 | 33 | 2 | 3 | 0 | 2 | 0 | 8 | 1 | |
| | DF | (Scotland) SCO | Paul Byrne | 1 | 0 | 0 | 0 | 1 | 0 | 0 | 0 | 0 | 0 | |
| | MF | (Scotland) SCO | Fraser Keast | 1 | 0 | 1 | 0 | 0 | 0 | 0 | 0 | 0 | 0 | |
| | MF | (Scotland) SCO | David Taylor | 1 | 0 | 1 | 0 | 0 | 0 | 0 | 0 | 0 | 0 | |
| | MF | (Scotland) SCO | Patrick McCabe | 1 | 0 | 1 | 0 | 0 | 0 | 0 | 0 | 0 | 0 | |
| | MF | (Scotland) SCO | Darren Smith | 35 | 2 | 22 | 1 | 1 | 0 | 3 | 0 | 9 | 1 | |
| | MF | (England) ENG | Kevin McDonald | 44 | 0 | 32 | 0 | 2 | 0 | 2 | 0 | 8 | 0 | |
| | MF | (Scotland) SCO | Scott McLaughlin | 49 | 6 | 34 | 4 | 3 | 1 | 3 | 0 | 9 | 1 | |
| | MF | (Australia) AUS | Michael Brown | 17 | 0 | 11 | 0 | 1 | 0 | 2 | 0 | 3 | 0 | |
| | FW | (Scotland) SCO | Paul Di Giacomo | 48 | 13 | 33 | 5 | 3 | 1 | 3 | 2 | 9 | 5 | |
| | MF | (England) ENG | Simon Lynch | 45 | 14 | 33 | 10 | 3 | 3 | 2 | 0 | 7 | 1 | |
| | MF | (Scotland) SCO | Joe Cardle | 34 | 3 | 24 | 1 | 3 | 1 | 3 | 0 | 4 | 1 | |
| | FW | (Scotland) SCO | John Baird | 17 | 4 | 13 | 2 | 0 | 0 | 0 | 0 | 4 | 2 | |
| | FW | (Scotland) SCO | Steven McDougall | 45 | 0 | 30 | 0 | 3 | 0 | 3 | 0 | 9 | 0 | |
| | FW | (Scotland) SCO | Stuart Noble | 23 | 2 | 16 | 0 | 1 | 0 | 2 | 1 | 4 | 1 | |
| | FW | (Scotland) SCO | Stephen Maguire | 17 | 1 | 11 | 1 | 3 | 0 | 2 | 0 | 1 | 0 | |
| | FW | (Scotland) SCO | Kevin Watt | 8 | 0 | 6 | 0 | 1 | 0 | 0 | 0 | 1 | 0 | |
| | FW | (Scotland) SCO | Stefan McCluskey | 1 | 0 | 1 | 0 | 0 | 0 | 0 | 0 | 0 | 0 | |
| | FW | (Scotland) SCO | Ryan Donnelly | 1 | 0 | 1 | 0 | 0 | 0 | 0 | 0 | 0 | 0 | |
| | FW | (Scotland) SCO | Kieran Donaghy | 1 | 0 | 1 | 0 | 0 | 0 | 0 | 0 | 0 | 0 | |

a. Includes other competitive competitions, including playoffs and the Scottish Challenge Cup.
