= 2008–09 Ross County F.C. season =

Ross County
2008–09 season
- Chairman: David Siegel
- Manager: Derek Adams
- Stadium: Victoria Park
- First Division: Eighth place
- Challenge Cup: Final, lost to Airdrie United
- League Cup: First round, lost to Airdrie United
- Scottish Cup: Fourth round, lost to Hamilton Academical
- Top goalscorer: League: Steven Craig (10); Sean Higgins (10); All: Sean Higgins (14)
- Highest home attendance: 3,444 vs. Dundee, 2 August 2008
- Lowest home attendance: 1,625 vs. Partick Thistle, 25 November 2008
- Average home league attendance: 2,275

The 2008–09 season was Ross County's first season back in the Scottish First Division, having been promoted as champions of the Scottish Second Division at the end of the 2007–08 season. They also competed in the Challenge Cup, League Cup and the Scottish Cup.

== Summary ==
Ross County finished Eighth in the First Division. They reached the first round of the League Cup, the fourth round of the Scottish Cup, and the final of the Challenge Cup, losing 3–2 on penalties to Airdrie United.

== Results and fixtures ==
Win Draw Loss

=== Scottish First Division ===
2 August 2008 Scottish First Division	Ross County	1 – 2	Dundee	Victoria Park
	Daal 90'	BBC Report	Antoine-Curier 35' (Penalty); Paton 50'	Attendance: 3,444; Referee: Tumilty

9 August 2008 Scottish First Division	Livingston	2 – 0	Ross County	Almondvale Stadium
15:00	Griffiths 12'; Talbot 66'	BBC Report	Craig (yellow card) 40' (red card); Higgins (yellow card) 63' (red card)	Attendance: 1,068; Referee: McKendrick

16 August 2008 Scottish First Division	Clyde	2 – 2	Ross County	Broadwood Stadium
	MacLennan 68'; Clarke 82'	BBC Report	Craig 17'; Morrison 19'	Attendance: 966; Referee: Murray

30 August 2008 Scottish First Division	Partick Thistle	0 – 1	Ross County	Firhill Stadium
	Robertson (red card) 43'	BBC Report	Craig 8'	Attendance: 2,945; Referee: Brown

3 September 2008 Scottish First Division	Queen of the South	1 – 0	Ross County	Palmerston Park
	Weatherston 87'	BBC Report		Attendance: 2,525; Referee: Winter

13 September 2008 Scottish First Division	Ross County	1 – 2	St Johnstone	Victoria Park
	Brittain 70'	BBC Report	Samuel 29', 47'	Attendance: 2,474; Referee: Collum

20 September 2008 Scottish First Division	Dunfermline Athletic	3 – 1	Ross County	East End Park
	S Thomson 5'; Phinn 44'; Bell 71'	BBC Report	Craig 57'; Hart (yellow card) 70' (yellow-red card)	Attendance: 2,631; Referee: Boyle

27 September 2008 Scottish First Division	Ross County	2 – 0	Airdrie United	Victoria Park
	Smyth 10' (Own Goal); Craig 77'	BBC Report		Attendance: 2,259; Referee: McKendrick

4 October 2008 Scottish First Division	Ross County	3 – 0	Greenock Morton	Victoria Park
	Hart 75'; Craig 76'; Higgins 84'	BBC Report		Attendance: 2,290; Referee: Muir

18 October 2008 Scottish First Division	Dundee	1 – 2	Ross County	Dens Park
	Antoine-Curier 58'	BBC Report	Dowie 23'; Craig 41'	Attendance: 3,228; Referee: Allan

25 October 2008 Scottish First Division	Ross County	0 – 2	Queen of the South	Victoria Park
		BBC Report	Dobbie 36'; McGowan 90'	Attendance: 2,232; Referee: Finnie

1 November 2008 Scottish First Division	Ross County	3 – 0	Clyde	Victoria Park
	Higgins 82'; Gardyne 84'; Hart 90'	BBC Report		Attendance: 2,205; Referee: McCurry

8 November 2008 Scottish First Division	St Johnstone	2 – 1	Ross County	McDiarmid Park
	Hardie 45'; Samuel 80'	BBC Report	McCulloch 83'	Attendance: 2,714; Referee: MacDonald

22 November 2008 Scottish First Division	Airdrie United	0 – 2	Ross County	Excelsior Stadium
		BBC Report	Higgins 33'; Brittain 67'	Attendance: 939; Referee: Muir

25 November 2008 Scottish First Division	Ross County	1 – 0	Partick Thistle	Victoria Park
	Daal 68'	BBC Report		Attendance: 1,625; Referee: MacDonald

13 December 2008 Scottish First Division	Ross County	1 – 4	Livingston	Victoria Park
15:00	McCulloch 45'	BBC Report	Davidson 34'; Elliot 47'; Griffiths 70'; Quinn 90'	Attendance: 2,180; Referee: Law

20 December 2008 Scottish First Division	Greenock Morton	2 – 1	Ross County	Cappielow Park
	Masterton 34'; Wake 63'	BBC Report	Morrison 23'	Attendance: 1,853; Referee: Charleston

27 December 2008 Scottish First Division	Partick Thistle	0 – 2	Ross County	Firhill Stadium
		Partick Report	Higgins 24', 84'	Attendance: 2,465; Referee: Finnie

17 January 2009 Scottish First Division	Ross County	1 – 0	Queen of the South	Victoria Park
	Daal 73'	BBC Report		Attendance: 2,323; Referee: O'Reilly

24 January 2009 Scottish First Division	Clyde	2 – 0	Ross County	Broadwood Stadium
	McLaren 44'; Waddell 66'	BBC Report		Attendance: 776; Referee: Smith

31 January 2009 Scottish First Division	Livingston	4 – 2	Ross County	Almondvale Stadium
15:00	One 10'; Davidson 15'; MackKay 45' (pen.); Griffiths 90'	BBC Report	Hart 50'; Higgins 15'	Attendance: Conroy; Referee: 1,378

7 February 2009 Scottish First Division	Ross County	2 – 2	St Johnstone	Victoria Park
	McCulloch 33'; Craig 45'	BBC Report	McCaffrey 53'; Holmes 77'	Attendance: 2,240; Referee: Finnie

21 February 2009 Scottish First Division	Dunfermline Athletic	1 – 2	Ross County	East End Park
	Bayne 60'	BBC Report	Brewster 45'; Higgins 67'	Attendance: 3,331; Referee: Salmond

28 February 2009 Scottish First Division	Ross County	0 – 0	Airdrie United	Victoria Park
		BBC Report		Attendance: 2,290; Referee: MacKay

7 March 2009 Scottish First Division	St Johnstone	0 – 0	Ross County	McDiarmid Park
		BBC Report		Attendance: 2,727; Referee: Smith

10 March 2009 Scottish First Division	Ross County	0 – 2	Partick Thistle	Victoria Park
		BBC Report	Doolan 67', 69'	Attendance: 2,017; Referee: Collum

14 March 2009 Scottish First Division	Dundee	2 – 0	Ross County	Dens Park
	McMenamin 32'; Antoine-Curier 45' (Penalty)	BBC Report		Attendance: 3,381; Referee: McCurry

21 March 2009 Scottish First Division	Ross County	1 – 1	Greenock Morton	Victoria Park
	Keddie 44'	BBC Report	IRussell 90'	Attendance: 2,236; Referee: Boyle

24 March 2009 Scottish First Division	Ross County	2 – 1	Dunfermline Athletic	Victoria Park
	Brittain 62'; Brewster 90'	BBC Report	Bayne 87'	Attendance: 1,782; Referee: MacDonald

28 March 2009 Scottish First Division	Ross County	1 – 1	Dundee	Victoria Park
	Higgins 90'	BBC Report	Antoine-Curier 66'; McHale (yellow card) 85' (red card); Mackenzie (red card) 90'	Attendance: 2,296; Referee: Tumilty

4 April 2009 Scottish First Division	Queen of the South	1 – 2	Ross County	Palmerston Park
	Dobbie 46'	BBC Report	Higgins 5'; Brewster 19'	Attendance: 2,029; Referee: Charleston

11 April 2009 Scottish First Division	Ross County	0 – 0	Clyde	Victoria Park
		BBC Report		Attendance: 2,078; Referee: MacKay

18 April 2009 Scottish First Division	Ross County	1 – 3	Dunfermline Athletic	Victoria Park
	Craig 47'	BBC Report	Woods 35'; Kirk 73'; Bayne 77'	Attendance: 2,413; Referee: McDermott

25 April 2009 Scottish First Division	Airdrie United	1 – 0	Ross County	Excelsior Stadium
	McKenna 65'	BBC Report		Attendance: 927; Referee: Conroy

2 May 2009 Scottish First Division	Ross County	2 – 2	Livingston	Victoria Park
15:00	Craig 53' (59), pen.' Keddie (red card) 16'	BBC Report	Griffiths 17'; Halliday 51'	Attendance: 2,567; Referee: Somers

9 May 2009 Scottish First Division	Greenock Morton	0 – 2	Ross County	Cappielow Park
		BBC Report	Brittain 55'; Higgins 67'	Attendance: 1,956; Referee: Dougal

=== Scottish Challenge Cup ===
26 July 2008 Scottish Challenge Cup round 1	Ross County	2 – 1	St Johnstone	Victoria Park
15:00	Winters 53'; Higgins 65'	BBC Report	Samuel 84'	Attendance: 2,365; Referee: Thomson

12 August 2008 Scottish Challenge Cup round 2	Raith Rovers	1 – 2	Ross County	Stark's Park
19:45	Weir 72'	BBC Report	Keddie 52', 54'	Attendance: 1,080; Referee: Collum

7 September 2008 Scottish Challenge Cup QF	Clyde	0 – 1	Ross County	Broadwood Stadium
15:00	McGregor (red card) 45'	BBC Report	Craig 25'	Attendance: 756; Referee: Conroy

12 October 2008 Scottish Challenge Cup SF	Ross County	4 – 1	Greenock Morton	Victoria Park
15:00	Craig 6'; Daal 42', 62'; Dowie 84'	BBC Report	McManus (red card) 55'; Weatherson 77'	Attendance: 1,396; Referee: Tumilty

16 November 2008 Scottish Challenge Cup Final	Airdrie United	2 – 2 (a.e.t.) (3 – 2 p)	Ross County	McDiarmid Park
15:00	McKenna 80'; Dowie 103' (o.g.)	BBC Report	Nixon 59' (o.g.); Higgins 113'	Attendance: 4,091; Referee: Murray
	Penalties
	Lynch (penalty missed); McLaughlin (penalty scored); Hazley (penalty missed); McDonald (penalty scored); Smyth (penalty scored)		(penalty missed) Winters; (penalty scored) Higgins; (penalty scored) Hart; (penalty missed) Morrison; (penalty missed) Scott

=== Scottish League Cup ===
5 August 2008 Scottish League Cup round 1	Ross County	2 – 3 (a.e.t.)	Airdrie United	Victoria Park
19:45	Dall 43'; Hart 76'	BBC Report	di Giacomo 23' 112'; Noble 86'	Attendance: 869; Referee: Allan

=== Scottish Cup ===
29 November 2008 Scottish Cup round 3	Ross County	2 – 2	Dumbarton	Victoria Park
15:00	Higgins 23', 57'	BBC Report	Carcary 80', 83'	Attendance: 1,200; Referee: O'Reily

15 December 2008 Scottish Cup round 3 replay	Dumbarton	1 – 2	Ross County	Strathclyde Homes Stadium
19:45	Gordon 46'	BBC Report	Brittain 24' (pen.); Hart 37'	Attendance: 557; Referee: O'Reily

10 January 2009 Scottish Cup round 4	Ross County	0 – 1	Hamilton Academical	Victoria Park
15:00		BBC Report	Swailes 22'; McArthur (red card) 90'	Attendance: 2,300; Referee: Allan

== League table ==
Pos	Team	Pld	W	D	L	GF	GA	GD	Pts	Promotion, qualification or relegation
6	Greenock Morton	36	12	11	13	40	40	0	47	
7	Livingston (R)	36	13	8	15	56	58	−2	47 (Note: Demoted to 3rd Division for Financial Irregularities)	Relegation to the Third Division
8	Ross County	36	13	8	15	42	46	−4	47	
9	Airdrie United	36	10	12	14	29	43	−14	42 (Note: Spared Relegation as Losing Finalist in the playoff due to Livingston)	Qualification for the First Division Play-offs (Note: The 9th placed team will be entered into a play-off with the Second Division's 2nd, 3rd and 4th placed teams. The winning team will be awarded a place in the 2009–10 First Division.)
10	Clyde (R)	36	10	9	17	41	58	−17	39	Relegation to the Second Division

Source: BBC Sport
Rules for classification: 1) points; 2) goal difference; 3) number of goals scored.
(R) Relegated

== Player statistics ==
=== Squad ===
No.	Pos	Nat	Player	Total		First Division		Challenge Cup		League Cup		Scottish Cup	
No.	Pos	Nat	Player	Apps	Goals	Apps	Goals	Apps	Goals	Apps	Goals	Apps	Goals
	GK	(England) ENG	Tony Bullock	24	0	16+0	0	5+0	0	1+0	0	2+0	0
	GK	(Scotland) SCO	Joe Malin	8	0	7+1	0	0+0	0	0+0	0	0+0	0
	GK	(Scotland) SCO	Derek Soutar	14	0	13+0	0	0+0	0	0+0	0	1+0	0
	DF	(Scotland) SCO	Scott Boyd	36	0	28+0	0	5+0	0	0+0	0	3+0	0
	DF	(Scotland) SCO	Martyn Corrigan	10	0	10+0	0	0+0	0	0+0	0	0+0	0
	DF	(Scotland) SCO	Andy Dowie	37	2	28+1	1	5+0	1	1+0	0	2+0	0
	DF	(Scotland) SCO	Stuart Golabek	18	0	14+1	0	1+0	0	1+0	0	1+0	0
	DF	(Scotland) SCO	Alex Keddie	35	3	25+4	1	4+0	2	0+0	0	2+0	0
	DF	(Scotland) SCO	Mark McCulloch	44	3	35+0	3	5+0	0	1+0	0	3+0	0
	DF	(Scotland) SCO	Scott Morrison	22	2	7+8	2	2+2	0	0+0	0	2+1	0
	DF	(Scotland) SCO	Steven Watt	29	0	23+1	0	0+1	0	1+0	0	3+0	0
	MF	(Scotland) SCO	Richard Brittain	39	5	30+0	4	5+0	0	1+0	0	3+0	1
	MF	(Scotland) SCO	Richard Hart	42	5	24+9	3	5+0	0	1+0	1	2+1	1
	MF	(Scotland) SCO	Paul Lawson	24	0	18+2	0	3+0	0	1+0	0	0+0	0
	MF	(Scotland) SCO	Martin Scott	32	0	16+8	0	1+4	0	0+0	0	1+2	0
	MF	(Scotland) SCO	Adam Strachan	33	0	12+12	0	3+2	0	1+0	0	2+1	0
	FW	(Scotland) SCO	Craig Brewster	10	3	10+0	3	0+0	0	0+0	0	0+0	0
	FW	(England) ENG	Steven Craig	36	12	26+5	10	2+0	2	1+0	0	2+0	0
	FW	(Netherlands) NED	Dyron Daal	35	6	16+12	3	2+1	2	1+0	1	2+1	0
	FW	(Scotland) SCO	Michael Gardyne	30	1	9+18	1	1+1	0	0+0	0	0+1	0
	FW	(Scotland) SCO	Sean Higgins	39	14	23+8	10	4+1	2	0+1	0	2+0	2
	FW	(Scotland) SCO	Dene Shields	1	0	0+1	0	0+0	0	0+0	0	0+0	0
	FW	(Scotland) SCO	John Stewart	10	0	3+6	0	0+0	0	0+0	0	0+1	0
	FW	(Scotland) SCO	David Winters	11	1	3+3	0	2+1	1	0+1	0	0+1	0

== See also ==
- List of Ross County F.C. seasons
