= 2008 Scottish Challenge Cup final =

- Event: 2008–09 Scottish Challenge Cup
Airdrie United	Ross County
2	2
- After extra time Airdrie United won 3–2 on penalties
- Date: 16 November 2008
- Venue: McDiarmid Park, Perth
- Referee: Calum Murray
- Attendance: 4,091

The 2008 Scottish Challenge Cup final was played on 16 November 2008 and was the 18th Scottish Challenge Cup final. The final was contested by Ross County who beat Greenock Morton 4–1 in their semi-final and Airdrie United who beat Partick Thistle 1–0. The match was played at McDiarmid Park, Perth. Airdrie won the game 3–2 on penalties, after the match ended 2–2 following extra time.

Both teams had appeared in a Challenge Cup final before, Ross County had been in two, defeating Clyde on penalties in the 2006 final but losing the 2004 final to Falkirk. whereas Airdrie's only final ended in defeat, losing to Inverness Caledonian Thistle in the 2003 final.

== Route to the final ==
=== Airdrie United ===
Round	Opposition	Score
First round	Dumbarton (h)	3–2
Second round	East Fife (a)	2–0
Quarter-final	Cowdenbeath (a)	2–1
Semi-final	Partick Thistle (a)	1–0

=== Ross County ===
Round	Opposition	Score
First round	St Johnstone (h)	2–1
Second round	Raith Rovers (a)	2–1
Quarter-final	Clyde (a)	1–0
Semi-final	Greenock Morton (h)	4–1

== Match details ==
16 November 2008
15:00

Airdrie United	2–2 (a.e.t.)	Ross County
McKenna 80'; Dowie 103' (o.g.)	Report	Nixon 59' (o.g.); Higgins 113'
Penalties
Lynch (penalty missed); McLaughlin (penalty scored); Hazley (penalty missed); McDonald (penalty scored); Smyth (penalty scored)	3–2	(penalty missed) Winters; (penalty scored) Higgins; (penalty scored) Hart; (penalty missed) Morrison; (penalty missed) Scott

McDiarmid Park, Perth
Attendance: 4,091
Referee: Calum Murray

Airdrie United	Ross County

AIRDRIE UNITED:
GK	1	(Scotland) Stephen Robertson
RB	2	(Northern Ireland) Marc Smyth	(yellow card) 17'
LB	3	(Scotland) Paul Lovering		(substituted off) 48'
CM	4	(England) Kevin McDonald	(yellow card) 91'
CB	5	(Scotland) Bobby Donnelly
CB	6	(Scotland) David Nixon		(substituted off) 70'
RM	7	(Scotland) Steven McDougall		(substituted off) 68'
CM	8	(Scotland) Stephen McKenna
CF	9	(Scotland) Paul di Giacomo
CM	10	(Scotland) Scott McLaughlin
LM	11	(England) Joe Cardle	(yellow card) 83'
Substitutes:
MF	12	(Scotland) Darren Smith		(substituted in) 70'
DF	14	(Northern Ireland) Matthew Hazley		(substituted in) 48'
FW	15	(Scotland) Simon Lynch		(substituted in) 68'
FW	16	(Scotland) Stuart Noble
GK	17	(Scotland) Lee Hollis
Manager:
(Scotland) Kenny Black

ROSS COUNTY:
GK	1	(England) Tony Bullock
RB	2	(Scotland) Mark McCulloch
LB	3	(Scotland) Alex Keddie	(yellow card) 96'
CB	4	(Scotland) Andy Dowie
CB	5	(Scotland) Scott Boyd	(yellow card) 108'
RM	6	(Scotland) Michael Gardyne		(substituted off) 105'
CM	7	(Scotland) Richie Hart
CM	8	(Scotland) Richard Brittain		(substituted off) 105'
CF	9	(Netherlands Antilles) Dyron Daal
CF	10	(Scotland) Sean Higgins	(yellow card) 120+1'
LM	11	(Scotland) Adam Strachan		(substituted off) 114'
Substitutes:
MF	12	(Scotland) Martin Scott		(substituted in) 105'
DF	14	(Scotland) Steven Watt
MF	15	(Scotland) Scott Morrison		(substituted in) 114'
FW	16	(Scotland) David Winters		(substituted in) 105'
GK	18	(Scotland) Joe Malin
Manager:
(Scotland) Derek Adams

MATCH RULES

- 90 minutes
- 30 minutes of extra-time if necessary
- Penalty shoot-out if scores still level
- Five named substitutes
- Maximum of 3 substitutions
