= 2008–09 Scottish First Division =

Irn-Bru Scottish First Division
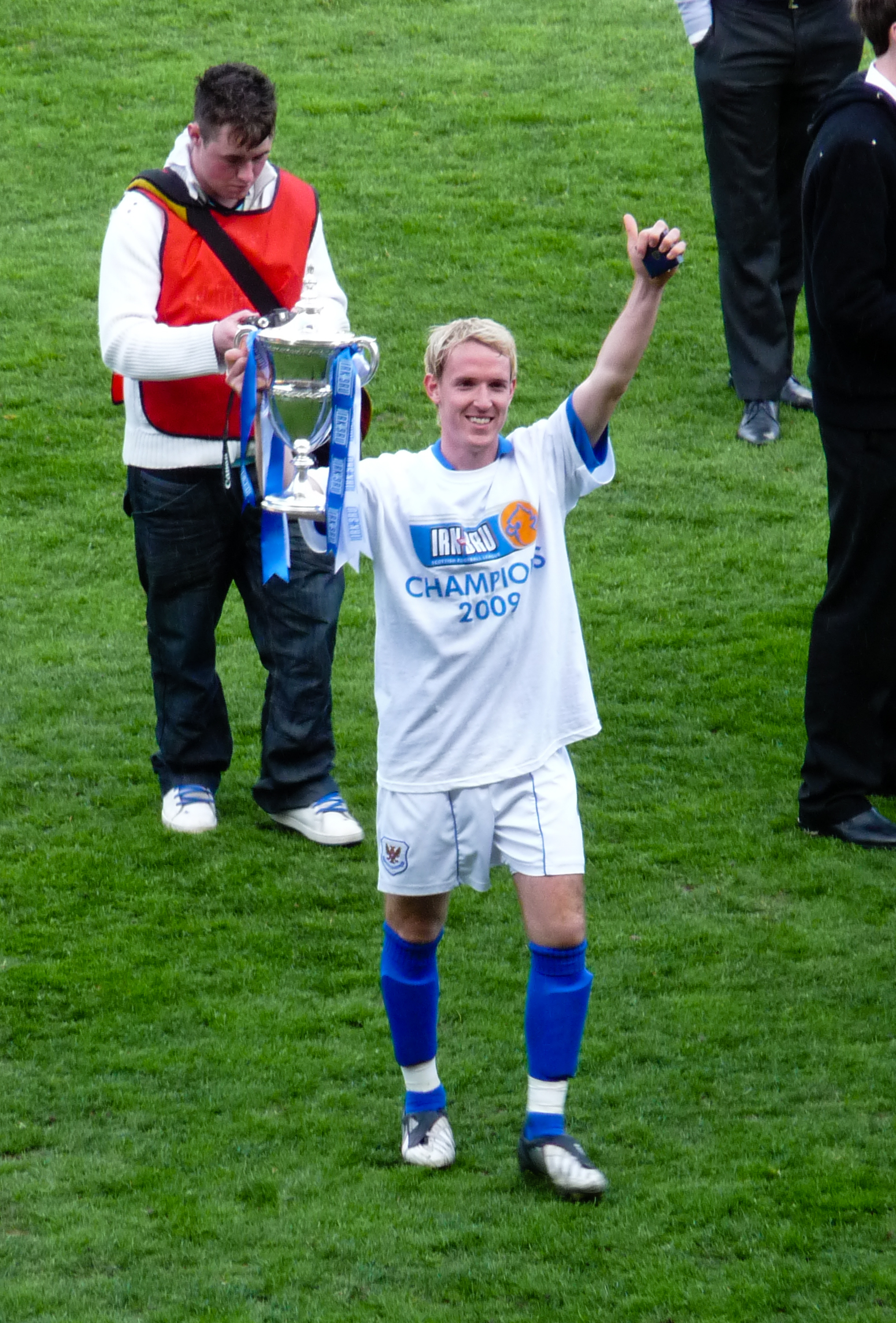
- St Johnstone player Gary Irvine holding the First Division trophy in May 2009
- Season: 2008–09
- Champions: St Johnstone
- Promoted: St Johnstone
- Relegated: Clyde
- Top goalscorer: Stephen Dobbie (24)
- Biggest home win: Queen of the South 7–1 Clyde
- Biggest away win: Airdrie United 0–4 St Johnstone

The 2008–09 Scottish First Division was the 15th season of the First Division in its current format of ten teams.

== Promotion and relegation from 2007–08 ==
=== SPL & First Division ===
Promoted from First Division to Scottish Premier League

- Hamilton Academical

=== First & Second Divisions ===
Relegated from First Division to Second Division

- Stirling Albion

Promoted from Second Division to First Division

- Ross County (champions)
- Airdrie United (losing play-off finalists, promoted due to Gretna's relegation to Division Three)

== League table ==
Pos	Team	Pld	W	D	L	GF	GA	GD	Pts	Promotion, qualification or relegation
1	St Johnstone (C, P)	36	17	14	5	55	35	+20	65	Promotion to the Premier League
2	Partick Thistle	36	16	7	13	39	38	+1	55	
3	Dunfermline Athletic	36	14	9	13	52	44	+8	51	
4	Dundee	36	13	11	12	33	32	+1	50	
5	Queen of the South	36	12	11	13	57	50	+7	47	
6	Greenock Morton	36	12	11	13	40	40	0	47	
7	Livingston (R)	36	13	8	15	56	58	−2	47 (Note: Demoted to 3rd Division for Financial Irregularities)	Relegation to the Third Division
8	Ross County	36	13	8	15	42	46	−4	47	
9	Airdrie United	36	10	12	14	29	43	−14	42 (Note: Spared Relegation as Losing Finalist in the playoff due to Livingston)	Qualification for the First Division Play-offs (Note: The 9th placed team will be entered into a play-off with the Second Division's 2nd, 3rd and 4th placed teams. The winning team will be awarded a place in the 2009–10 First Division.)
10	Clyde (R)	36	10	9	17	41	58	−17	39	Relegation to the Second Division

Source: BBC Sport
Rules for classification: 1) points; 2) goal difference; 3) number of goals scored.
(C) Champions; (P) Promoted; (R) Relegated

== Results ==
Teams play each other four times in this league. In the first half of the season each team plays every other team twice (home and away) and then do the same in the second half of the season.

=== First half of season ===
Home \ Away	AIR	CLY	DND	DNF	GMO	LIV	PAR	QOS	ROS	STJ
Airdrie United		0–2	0–0	1–3	5–0	0–0	0–1	2–0	0–2	1–1
Clyde	1–0		1–0	0–2	1–1	2–1	1–1	0–2	2–2	2–2
Dundee	1–1	1–0		0–0	1–0	0–3	0–0	2–0	1–2	1–1
Dunfermline Athletic	0–0	4–4	0–1		0–1	1–2	1–0	2–1	3–1	1–2
Greenock Morton	2–0	1–0	2–0	1–1		1–2	2–0	0–0	2–1	2–2
Livingston	1–2	2–1	1–2	2–3	1–0		3–1	2–0	2–0	0–1
Partick Thistle	2–1	2–0	0–0	1–0	2–1	2–1		2–0	0–1	4–0
Queen of the South	0–0	0–2	3–1	1–2	1–4	6–1	2–0		1–0	2–2
Ross County	2–0	3–0	1–2	2–1	3–0	1–4	1–0	0–2		1–2
St Johnstone	3–1	2–3	2–0	0–3	1–0	2–0	3–0	0–0	2–1	

Source: BBC Sport
Legend: Blue = home team win; Yellow = draw; Red = away team win.

=== Second half of season ===
Home \ Away	AIR	CLY	DND	DNF	GMO	LIV	PAR	QOS	ROS	STJ
Airdrie United		1–0	1–0	1–1	1–0	4–4	0–1	2–0	1–0	0–4
Clyde	3–0		2–0	1–4	2–4	0–1	2–4	1–1	2–0	1–3
Dundee	0–1	2–1		1–0	0–0	4–1	4–0	2–3	2–0	0–1
Dunfermline Athletic	1–1	1–1	1–1		2–1	1–0	0–1	0–2	1–2	1–3
Greenock Morton	0–0	2–0	2–0	2–1		2–2	0–1	2–2	0–2	0–0
Livingston	1–1	1–1	0–1	4–2	0–2		2–4	2–2	4–2	1–0
Partick Thistle	0–1	0–1	1–1	2–3	1–0	1–0		0–2	0–2	0–0
Queen of the South	4–0	7–1	0–1	0–3	1–1	3–3	2–2		1–2	3–3
Ross County	0–0	0–0	1–1	1–3	1–1	2–2	0–2	1–0		2–2
St Johnstone	3–0	1–0	0–0	0–0	3–1	1–0	1–1	2–3	0–0	

Source: BBC Sport
Legend: Blue = home team win; Yellow = draw; Red = away team win.

== Top scorers ==
Rank	Scorer	Team	Goals
1	(Scotland) Stephen Dobbie	Queen of the South	24
2	(Scotland) Leigh Griffiths	Livingston	18
3	(Northern Ireland) Andy Kirk	Dunfermline Athletic	15
4	(Scotland) Steven Milne	St Johnstone	14
4	(France) Mickaël Antoine-Curier	Dundee	14
6	(Scotland) Pat Clarke	Clyde	11
7	(Scotland) Simon Lynch	Airdrie United	10
7	(Scotland) Steven Craig	Ross County	10
7	(Scotland) Sean Higgins	Ross County	10
10	(England) Peter Weatherson	Greenock Morton	9
10	(England) Brian Wake	Greenock Morton	9
10	(Scotland) Gary Harkins	Partick Thistle	9
13	(Scotland) Nick Phinn	Dunfermline Athletic	8
14	(Scotland) Colin McMenamin	Dundee	7
15	(Scotland) William McLaren	Clyde	6
15	(Scotland) Ruari MacLennan	Clyde	6

Source: The League Insider

== Attendance ==
Team	Stadium	Capacity	Highest	Lowest	Average
Dundee	Dens Park	11,856	6,537	2,831	3,995
St Johnstone	McDiarmid Park	10,673	7,238	2,259	3,502
Dunfermline Athletic	East End Park	11,998	4,998	1,371	3,255
Partick Thistle	Firhill Stadium	10,887	3,378	2,296	2,956
Queen of the South	Palmerston Park	6,412	3,339	2,029	2,720
Greenock Morton	Cappielow	11,612	3,323	1,685	2,279
Ross County	Victoria Park	6,310	3,444	1,625	2,279
Livingston	Almondvale Stadium	10,016	2,169	1,068	1,728
Airdrie United	New Broomfield	10,171	2,165	633	1,356
Clyde	Broadwood Stadium	8,006	2,114	776	1,236

Source: The League Insider

== Kits and shirt sponsors ==
Team	Kit supplier	Shirt sponsor(s)	Notes
Airdrie United	Surridge	St. Andrew's Hospice	New home strip.
Clyde	Surridge	Optical Express/Reface Scotland	New kit supplier and new away kit sponsor. Reface Scotland are away kit sponsor.
Dundee	Bukta	Bukta	New home kit, Bukta replace Signitures4U as sponsor.
Dunfermline Athletic	Puma	The Purvis Group	New kit supplier, return to traditional black and white striped home kit.
Greenock Morton	Bukta	Millions	New home kit
Livingston	Macron	RDF Consulting	New kit supplier Macron replacing Nike with a new yellow home kit, while IT solutions provider RDF Consulting sponsor the Lions for the next two seasons.
Partick Thistle	Puma	Ignis Asset Management	Puma replace Diadora as kit supplier.
Queen of the South	Surridge	JB Houston Butchers/Maxwelltown Builders	New home and away kits. Home kit is traditional blue and Away kit is red. JB Houston Butchers displayed on front of shirt, Maxwelltown Builders at the back.
Ross County	Adidas	HIGHnet	
St Johnstone	Surridge	George Wimpey	New home kit

== Managerial changes ==
Team	Outgoing manager	Manner of departure	Date of vacancy	Replaced by	Date of appointment	Table position
Dundee	(Scotland) Alex Rae	Sacked	20 October	(Scotland) Jocky Scott	30 October	8
Livingston	(Italy) Roberto Landi	Sacked	1 December	(Scotland) Paul Hegarty	5 December	5
Livingston	(Scotland) Paul Hegarty	Suspended	25 April	(Scotland) John Murphy	30 June	6

== Monthly awards ==
Month	First Division manager		SFL Player		SFL Young player	
Month	Manager	Club	Player	Club	Player	Club
August	(Italy) Roberto Landi	Livingston	(Scotland) Stephen Robertson	Airdrie United	(Scotland) Leigh Griffiths	Livingston
September	(Scotland) Jim McIntyre	Dunfermline Athletic	(Scotland) Paul McManus	East Fife	(Scotland) Calum Elliot	Livingston
October	(Scotland) Derek McInnes	St Johnstone	(Scotland) Steven Milne	St Johnstone	(England) Dominic Shimmin	Greenock Morton
November	(Scotland) Jocky Scott	Dundee	(Scotland) Bryan Prunty	Ayr United	(Scotland) Kyle Benedictus	Dundee
December	(Scotland) John Brown	Clyde	(Scotland) Alan Main	St Johnstone	(Scotland) Chris McMenamin	Berwick Rangers
January	(Scotland) Ian McCall	Partick Thistle	(Scotland) Willie McLaren	Clyde	(Scotland) Bobby Barr	Albion Rovers
February	(Scotland) Jocky Scott	Dundee	(Scotland) Gary Harkins	Partick Thistle	(Scotland) Fraser McLaren	Berwick Rangers
March	(Scotland) Paul Hegarty	Livingston	(Scotland) Kevin Rutkiewicz	St Johnstone	(Scotland) Leigh Griffiths	Livingston
April	(Scotland) Gordon Chisholm	Queen of the South	(Scotland) Stephen Dobbie	Queen of the South	(Scotland) Kevin Moon	St Johnstone

== First Division play-offs ==
=== Semi-finals ===
The ninth placed team in the First Division played the fourth placed team in the Second Division and third placed team in the Second Division played the second placed team in the Second Division. The play-offs were played over two legs, the winning team in each semi-final advanced to the final.

Team 1	Agg.	Team 2	1st leg	2nd leg
Airdrie United	4 – 1	Peterhead	2–0	2–1
Brechin City	2 – 5	Ayr United	0–2	2–3

First legs

13 May 2009
19:45

Brechin City	0 – 2	Ayr United
	Report	Aitken 8' 36' (pen.)

Glebe Park, Brechin
Attendance: 902
Referee: B Winter

14 May 2009
19:45

Peterhead	0 – 2	Airdrie United
	Report	Baird 9'; McLaughlin 47'

Balmoor, Peterhead
Attendance: 1,364
Referee: C MacKay

Second legs

16 May 2009
15:00

Ayr United	3 – 2	Brechin City
Prunty 15'; Connolly 70'; Aitken 72'	Report	McAllister 38' 53' (pen.)

Somerset Park, Ayr
Attendance: 1,974
Referee: C Allan

17 May 2008
15:00

Airdrie United	2 – 1	Peterhead
Smyth 61'; Baird 85'	Report	McKay 45'

New Broomfield, Airdrie
Attendance: 1,008
Referee: S Finnie

=== Final ===
The two semi-final winners played each other over two legs. The winning team was awarded a place in the 2009–10 First Division.

Team 1	Agg.	Team 2	1st leg	2nd leg
Airdrie United	2 – 3	Ayr United	2–2	0–1

First leg

20 May 2009
19:45

Ayr United	2 – 2	Airdrie United
Roberts 48' 67'	Report	di Giacomo 30'; Baird 43'

Somerset Park, Ayr
Attendance: 3,378
Referee: E Smith

Second leg

24 May 2009
15:15

Airdrie United	0 – 1	Ayr United
	Report	Stevenson 29'

New Broomfield, Airdrie
Attendance: 3,303
Referee: I Brines
