= 2008–09 in Scottish football =

Football in Scotland
- Season: 2008–09

2008–09 in Scottish football

Premier League champions
- Rangers

First Division champions
- St Johnstone

Second Division champions
- Raith Rovers

Third Division champions
- Dumbarton

Scottish Cup winners
- Rangers

League Cup winners
- Celtic

Challenge Cup winners
- Airdrie United

Junior Cup winners
- Auchinleck Talbot

Teams in Europe
- Celtic, Hibernian, Motherwell, Queen of the South, Rangers

Scotland national team
- 2010 World Cup qualification

The 2008–09 season was the 112th season of competitive football in Scotland.

== Overview ==
- Hamilton Academical competed in the Scottish Premier League for the first time, their first season in the top-flight since the 1988–89 season, after being promoted as First Division champions the previous season.
- Gretna were due to play in the First Division after being relegated from the SPL. However, on 29 May 2008, they were demoted to the Third Division due to their failure to guarantee that they would fulfill their fixtures. Gretna resigned from the SFL on 3 June 2008 with the club's administrators warning of the threat of liquidation, creating an opening in the Third Division for a new SFL member. Following Gretna's demise a new club, Gretna 2008 was formed, they were given a place in the East of Scotland League, filling the gap left by Annan Athletic.
- Ross County competed in the First Division after being promoted as Second Division champions. Airdrie United were also promoted into the First Division, filling Gretna's space, as they were the losing play-off finalists.
- Stirling Albion competed in the Second Division after being relegated from the First Division as the bottom team.
- East Fife and Arbroath competed in the Second Division after being promoted as Third Division champions and Second Division play-off winners, respectively. Stranraer were also promoted into the Second Division, filling the empty space following Gretna's relegation, as they were the losing play-off finalists.
- Berwick Rangers and Cowdenbeath competed in the Third Division after being relegated from the Second Division as the bottom team and through the Second Division play-offs, respectively.
- Annan Athletic competed in the Third Division after being admitted to the SFL. They replaced Gretna, who resigned their league status on 3 June.
- St Mirren moved into their new 8,000 seater stadium, New St Mirren Park, on 31 January 2009.

== Notable events ==
=== 2008 ===
- 3 July – Annan Athletic, formerly of the East of Scotland League were admitted to the SFL, beating Cove Rangers, Edinburgh City, Preston Athletic and Spartans. They replaced Gretna, who resigned their league status on 3 June.
- 6 July – The first competitive match involving a Scottish team was played by Hibernian in the 2008 Intertoto Cup, they lost 2–0 to Elfsborg.
- 11 July – Gretna 2008, founded by the supporters of the bankrupt Gretna, join the East of Scotland League First Division.
- 26 July – Competitive domestic competition got under way with the first fixtures of the 2008–09 Challenge Cup.
- 2 August – The Scottish Football League begins with the playing of the first fixtures in the First and Second divisions.
- 8 August – Former SPL members and Scottish Cup finalists Gretna F.C. are formally liquidated by the club's administrators.
- 9 August – The first matches of the 2008–09 Scottish Premier League take place.
- 13 November – A consortium led by Berwick Rangers Supporters Club agreed a deal to take over the club. Following a poor run of form, manager Allan McGonigal resigned at the same time saying "I made up my mind that when the current directors left I would move on."
- 16 November – The 2008–09 Challenge Cup was won by Airdrie United who defeated Ross County 3–2 on penalties following a 2–2 draw after extra time, the winning penalty was scored by Marc Smyth.
- 4 December – Scotland fail in their attempt to have the match against Norway moved to October 2009, the match was to go ahead on 12 August 2009.
- 13 December – Celtic drew 1–1 with Heart of Midlothian at Celtic Park which was followed by a reported dressing-room argument between Celtic manager Gordon Strachan and player Aiden McGeady. This led to Strachan banning the player without pay for two weeks, after initially saying he would contest the sanction McGeady accepted the punishment and later returned to the team.

=== 2009 ===
- 3 January – St Mirren drew 0–0 with Motherwell in their last game at Love Street before they moved to New St Mirren Park.
- 28 January – Shares in Berwick Rangers were transferred to complete the deal which handed control to a consortium led by Berwick Rangers Supporters Trust.
- 31 January – St Mirren drew 1–1 with Kilmarnock in their first match at their new stadium.
- 14 February – The Scottish Premier League agreed to the Scottish Football Association's request to delay the start of the SPL season by a week to give the Scotland national team extra time to prepare for the match against Norway.
- 25 February – Former First Minister and former East Fife player Henry McLeish was appointed to chair a review of Scottish football.
- 15 March – Celtic won the 2008–09 League cup beating Rangers 2–0 after extra time in the final thanks to a goal from Darren O'Dea and an Aiden McGeady penalty.
- 4 April – Stranraer were relegated to the Third Division after being beaten 3–0 by Raith Rovers.
- 2 May – St Johnstone won promotion to the Scottish Premier League as First Division champions following a 3–1 win over Greenock Morton.
  - The Second Division title and promotion to the First Division was won by Raith Rovers, following a 1–0 win over Queen's Park at Hampden Park.
  - Clyde were relegated from the First Division despite beating Dundee 2–0.
- 9 May – The Third Division title was won by Dumbarton after they beat Annan Athletic 3–1, they therefore gained promotion to the second Division.
- 17 May – Queen's Park were relegated from the Second Division after a 2–1 aggregate loss to Stenhousemuir in their Second Division play-off Semi-final.
- 23 May – Falkirk beat Inverness Caledonian Thistle 1–0 to stay in the SPL and relegate Inverness to the First Division on goal difference.
  - Stenhousemuir won promotion to the Second Division as Second Division play-off winners, they beat Cowdenbeath 5–4 on penalties.
- 24 May – Rangers are crowned Scottish champions after beating Dundee United 3–0, Celtic drew 0–0 with Heart of Midlothian so Rangers won by 4 points.
  - Airdrie United are relegated to the Second Division and Ayr United are promoted to the First after Ayr won the First Division play-off Final 3–2 on aggregate.
- 30 May – Rangers won the 2008–09 Scottish Cup beating Falkirk 1–0 in the final thanks to a goal from substitute Nacho Novo just after half-time.

== Managerial changes ==
| Team | Outgoing manager | Manner of departure | Date of vacancy | Replaced by | Date of appointment |
|---|---|---|---|---|---|
| Albion Rovers | (Scotland) John McCormack | Resigned | 28 June | (Scotland) Paul Martin | 9 July |
| Heart of Midlothian | (Scotland) Stephen Frail | Sacked | 9 July | (Hungary) Csaba László | 11 July |
| Dundee | (Scotland) Alex Rae | Sacked | 20 October | (Scotland) Jocky Scott | 30 October |
| Montrose | (Scotland) Jim Weir | Sacked | 19 October | (Scotland) Steven Tweed | 15 January |
| Berwick Rangers | (Scotland) Alan McGonigal | Resigned | 13 November | (Scotland) Jimmy Crease | 26 December |
| Livingston | (Italy) Roberto Landi | Sacked | 1 December | (Scotland) Paul Hegarty | 5 December |
| Brechin City | (Northern Ireland) Michael O'Neill | Resigned | 15 December | (Scotland) Jim Duffy | 9 January |
| Elgin City | (Scotland) Robbie Williamson | Resigned | 20 December | (Scotland) Ross Jack | 23 January |
| Inverness CT | (Scotland) Craig Brewster | Sacked | 19 January | (England) Terry Butcher | 27 January |
| Stranraer | (Scotland) Derek Ferguson | Resigned | 24 January | (Scotland) Keith Knox | 17 February |
| East Fife | (Scotland) Dave Baikie | Resigned | 14 April | (Scotland) Stevie Crawford | 14 April |
| Livingston | (Scotland) Paul Hegarty | Suspended | 25 April | (Scotland) John Murphy | 30 June |
| Aberdeen | (Scotland) Jimmy Calderwood | Mutual consent | 24 May | (Scotland) Mark McGhee | 12 June |
| Celtic | (Scotland) Gordon Strachan | Resigned | 25 May | (England) Tony Mowbray | 16 June |
| Hibernian | (Finland) Mixu Paatelainen | Resigned | 29 May | (Scotland) John Hughes | 8 June |
| Falkirk | (Scotland) John Hughes | Resigned | 8 June | (Scotland) Eddie May | 23 June |
| Motherwell | (Scotland) Mark McGhee | Resigned | 12 June | (Republic of Ireland) Jim Gannon | 30 June |

== League Competitions ==
=== Scottish Premier League ===
| Pos | Team | Pld | W | D | L | GF | GA | GD | Pts | Qualification or relegation (Note: Teams played each other three times (33 matches), before the league split into two groups (the top six and the bottom six) for the last five matches.) |
|---|---|---|---|---|---|---|---|---|---|---|
| 1 | Rangers (C) | 38 | 26 | 8 | 4 | 77 | 28 | +49 | 86 | Qualification for the Champions League group stage |
| 2 | Celtic | 38 | 24 | 10 | 4 | 80 | 33 | +47 | 82 | Qualification for the Champions League third qualifying round |
| 3 | Heart of Midlothian | 38 | 16 | 11 | 11 | 40 | 37 | +3 | 59 | Qualification for the Europa League play-off round |
| 4 | Aberdeen | 38 | 14 | 11 | 13 | 41 | 40 | +1 | 53 | Qualification for the Europa League third qualifying round |
| 5 | Dundee United | 38 | 13 | 14 | 11 | 47 | 50 | −3 | 53 | |
| 6 | Hibernian | 38 | 11 | 14 | 13 | 42 | 46 | −4 | 47 | |
| 7 | Motherwell | 38 | 13 | 9 | 16 | 46 | 51 | −5 | 48 | Qualification for the Europa League first qualifying round (Note: Scotland were awarded an additional Europa League place as the association finished in third place of the UEFA Fair Play ranking. Motherwell earned this place as winners of the Scottish Fair Play ranking.) |
| 8 | Kilmarnock | 38 | 12 | 8 | 18 | 38 | 48 | −10 | 44 | |
| 9 | Hamilton Academical | 38 | 12 | 5 | 21 | 30 | 53 | −23 | 41 | |
| 10 | Falkirk | 38 | 9 | 11 | 18 | 37 | 52 | −15 | 38 | Qualification for the Europa League second qualifying round (Note: Since Rangers, the winners of the Scottish Cup, already qualified for the Champions League via their league position, Falkirk, the losing finalist, earned a spot in the Europa League.) |
| 11 | St Mirren | 38 | 9 | 10 | 19 | 33 | 52 | −19 | 37 | |
| 12 | Inverness Caledonian Thistle (R) | 38 | 10 | 7 | 21 | 37 | 58 | −21 | 37 | Relegation to the First Division |

Source: Scottish Professional Football League
Rules for classification: 1) Points; 2) Goal difference; 3) Goals scored
(C) Champions; (R) Relegated

=== Scottish First Division ===
| Pos | Team | Pld | W | D | L | GF | GA | GD | Pts | Promotion, qualification or relegation |
|---|---|---|---|---|---|---|---|---|---|---|
| 1 | St Johnstone (C, P) | 36 | 17 | 14 | 5 | 55 | 35 | +20 | 65 | Promotion to the Premier League |
| 2 | Partick Thistle | 36 | 16 | 7 | 13 | 39 | 38 | +1 | 55 | |
| 3 | Dunfermline Athletic | 36 | 14 | 9 | 13 | 52 | 44 | +8 | 51 | |
| 4 | Dundee | 36 | 13 | 11 | 12 | 33 | 32 | +1 | 50 | |
| 5 | Queen of the South | 36 | 12 | 11 | 13 | 57 | 50 | +7 | 47 | |
| 6 | Greenock Morton | 36 | 12 | 11 | 13 | 40 | 40 | 0 | 47 | |
| 7 | Livingston (R) | 36 | 13 | 8 | 15 | 56 | 58 | −2 | 47 (Note: Demoted to 3rd Division for Financial Irregularities) | Relegation to the Third Division |
| 8 | Ross County | 36 | 13 | 8 | 15 | 42 | 46 | −4 | 47 | |
| 9 | Airdrie United | 36 | 10 | 12 | 14 | 29 | 43 | −14 | 42 (Note: Spared Relegation as Losing Finalist in the playoff due to Livingston) | Qualification for the First Division Play-offs (Note: The 9th placed team will be entered into a play-off with the Second Division's 2nd, 3rd and 4th placed teams. The winning team will be awarded a place in the 2009–10 First Division.) |
| 10 | Clyde (R) | 36 | 10 | 9 | 17 | 41 | 58 | −17 | 39 | Relegation to the Second Division |

Source: BBC Sport
Rules for classification: 1) points; 2) goal difference; 3) number of goals scored.
(C) Champions; (P) Promoted; (R) Relegated

=== Scottish Second Division ===
| Pos | Team | Pld | W | D | L | GF | GA | GD | Pts | Promotion, qualification or relegation |
|---|---|---|---|---|---|---|---|---|---|---|
| 1 | Raith Rovers (C, P) | 36 | 22 | 10 | 4 | 60 | 27 | +33 | 76 | Promotion to the First Division |
| 2 | Ayr United (P) | 36 | 22 | 8 | 6 | 71 | 38 | +33 | 74 | Qualification for the First Division Play-offs (Note: The 2nd, 3rd and 4th placed teams will be entered into a play-off with the First Division's 9th placed team. The winning team will be awarded a place in the 2009–10 First Division) |
| 3 | Brechin City | 36 | 18 | 8 | 10 | 51 | 45 | +6 | 62 | Qualification for the First Division Play-offs |
| 4 | Peterhead | 36 | 15 | 11 | 10 | 54 | 39 | +15 | 56 | Qualification for the First Division Play-offs |
| 5 | Stirling Albion | 36 | 14 | 11 | 11 | 59 | 49 | +10 | 53 | |
| 6 | East Fife | 36 | 13 | 5 | 18 | 39 | 44 | −5 | 44 | |
| 7 | Arbroath | 36 | 11 | 8 | 17 | 44 | 46 | −2 | 41 | |
| 8 | Alloa Athletic | 36 | 11 | 8 | 17 | 47 | 59 | −12 | 41 | |
| 9 | Queen's Park (R) | 36 | 7 | 12 | 17 | 35 | 54 | −19 | 33 | Qualification for the Second Division Play-offs (Note: The 9th placed team will be entered into a play-off with the Third Division's 2nd, 3rd and 4th placed teams. The winning team will be awarded a place in the 2009–10 Second Division.) |
| 10 | Stranraer (R) | 36 | 3 | 7 | 26 | 31 | 90 | −59 | 16 | Relegation to the Second Third Division |

Source: BBC Sport
Rules for classification: 1) points; 2) goal difference; 3) number of goals scored.
(C) Champions; (P) Promoted; (R) Relegated

=== Scottish Third Division ===
| Pos | Team | Pld | W | D | L | GF | GA | GD | Pts | Promotion or qualification |
|---|---|---|---|---|---|---|---|---|---|---|
| 1 | Dumbarton (C, P) | 36 | 19 | 10 | 7 | 65 | 36 | +29 | 67 | Promotion to the Second Division |
| 2 | Cowdenbeath (P) | 36 | 18 | 9 | 9 | 48 | 34 | +14 | 63 (Note: Cowdenbeath were promoted due to Livingston's demotion from the First Division to the Third.) | Qualification for the Second Division Play-offs (Note: The 2nd, 3rd and 4th placed teams will be entered into a play-off with the Second Division's 9th placed team. The winning team will be awarded a place in the 2009–10 Second Division.) |
| 3 | East Stirlingshire | 36 | 19 | 4 | 13 | 57 | 50 | +7 | 61 | Qualification for the Second Division Play-offs |
| 4 | Stenhousemuir (O, P) | 36 | 16 | 8 | 12 | 55 | 46 | +9 | 56 | Qualification for the Second Division Play-offs |
| 5 | Montrose | 36 | 16 | 6 | 14 | 47 | 48 | −1 | 54 | |
| 6 | Forfar Athletic | 36 | 14 | 9 | 13 | 53 | 51 | +2 | 51 | |
| 7 | Annan Athletic | 36 | 14 | 8 | 14 | 56 | 45 | +11 | 50 | |
| 8 | Albion Rovers | 36 | 11 | 6 | 19 | 39 | 47 | −8 | 39 | |
| 9 | Berwick Rangers | 36 | 10 | 7 | 19 | 46 | 61 | −15 | 37 | |
| 10 | Elgin City | 36 | 7 | 5 | 24 | 31 | 79 | −48 | 26 | |

Source: BBC Sport
Rules for classification: 1) points; 2) goal difference; 3) number of goals scored.
(C) Champions; (O) Play-off winners; (P) Promoted

== Other honours ==
=== Cup honours ===
| Competition | Winner | Score | Runner-up | Match report |
|---|---|---|---|---|
| 2008–09 Scottish Cup | Rangers | 1–0 | Falkirk | Wikipedia |
| League Cup 2008–09 | Celtic | 2–0 (a.e.t.) | Rangers | Wikipedia |
| Challenge Cup 2008–09 | Airdrie United | 2–2 (a.e.t.) ( 3 – 2 pen.) | Ross County | Wikipedia |
| Junior Cup 2008–09 | Clydebank | 1–2 | Auchinleck Talbot | Daily Record |

=== Non-league honours ===
==== Senior ====
| Competition | Winner |
|---|---|
| Highland League 2008–09 | Cove Rangers |
| East of Scotland League 2008-09 | Spartans |
| South of Scotland League | Threave Rovers |

==== Junior ====
West Region

| Division | Winner |
|---|---|
| Premier League | Irvine Meadow |
| Division One | Largs Thistle |
| Ayrshire League | Dalry Thistle |
| Central League Division One | Rutherglen Glencairn |
| Central League Division Two | Blantyre Victoria |

East Region

| Division | Winner |
|---|---|
| Super League | Bonnyrigg Rose Athletic |
| Premier League | Musselburgh Athletic |
| North Division | Montrose Roselea |
| Central Division | St. Andrews United |
| South Division | Armadale Thistle |

North Region

| Division | Winner |
|---|---|
| Premier League | Banks O' Dee |
| Division One | Buchanhaven Hearts |
| Division Two | Inverness City |

=== Individual honours ===
==== PFA Scotland awards ====
| Award | Winner | Team |
|---|---|---|
| Players' Player of the Year | (Scotland) Scott Brown | Celtic |
| Young Player of the Year | (Republic of Ireland) James McCarthy | Hamilton Academical |
| Manager of the Year | (Scotland) Gordon Strachan | Celtic |

Celtic midfielder Scott Brown was named Players' Player of the Year after winning the most votes from his fellow players. He was named on the shortlist along with three other Old Firm players, Celtic defender Gary Caldwell and Rangers midfielder's Steven Davis and Pedro Mendes.

The Young Player of the Year award was awarded to James McCarthy who was named on the shortlist along with; Heart of Midlothian winger Andrew Driver, Hibernian striker Steven Fletcher and fellow Hamilton Academical midfielder James McArthur.

==== SFWA awards ====
| Award | Winner | Team |
|---|---|---|
| Footballer of the Year | (Scotland) Gary Caldwell | Celtic |
| Young Player of the Year | (Scotland) Steven Fletcher | Hibernian |
| Manager of the Year | (Hungary) Csaba Laszlo | Heart of Midlothian |
| International Player of the Year | (Scotland) Gary Caldwell | Celtic |

== Scottish clubs in Europe ==
=== Summary ===
| Club | Competition(s) | Final round | Coef. |
|---|---|---|---|
| Celtic | UEFA Champions League | Group stage | 7 |
| Rangers | UEFA Champions League | Second qualifying round | 0.5 |
| Motherwell | UEFA Cup | First round | 0.5 |
| Queen of the South | UEFA Cup | Second qualifying round | 0.5 |
| Hibernian | Intertoto Cup | Second round | 0 |

=== Celtic ===
| Date | Venue | Opponents | Score | Celtic scorer(s) | Report |
Champions League Group stage
| 17 September | Celtic Park, Glasgow (H) | (Denmark) Aalborg BK | 0–0 | | BBC Sport |
| 30 September | Estadio El Madrigal, Villarreal (A) | (Spain) Villarreal CF | 0–1 | | BBC Sport |
| 21 October | Old Trafford, Manchester (A) | (England) Manchester United | 0–3 | | BBC Sport |
| 5 November | Celtic Park, Glasgow (H) | (England) Manchester United | 1–1 | Scott McDonald | BBC Sport |
| 25 November | Energi Nord Arena, Aalborg (A) | (Denmark) Aalborg BK | 1–2 | Barry Robson | BBC Sport |
| 10 December | Celtic Park, Glasgow (H) | (Spain) Villarreal CF | 2–0 | Shaun Maloney, Aiden McGeady | BBC Sport |

=== Rangers ===
| Date | Venue | Opponents | Score | Rangers scorer(s) | Report |
Champions League Second qualifying round
| 30 July | Ibrox Stadium, Glasgow (H) | (Lithuania) FBK Kaunas | 0–0 | | BBC Sport |
| 5 August | S. Darius and S. Girėnas Stadium, Kaunas (A) | (Lithuania) FBK Kaunas | 1–2 | Kevin Thomson | BBC Sport |

=== Motherwell ===
| Date | Venue | Opponents | Score | Motherwell scorer(s) | Report |
UEFA Cup first round
| 18 September | Stade Marcel Picot, Tomblaine (A) | (France) AS Nancy | 0–1 | | BBC Sport |
| 2 October | Fir Park, Motherwell (H) | (France) AS Nancy | 0–2 | | BBC Sport |

=== Queen of the South ===
| Date | Venue | Opponents | Score | Queens scorer(s) | Report |
UEFA Cup Second Qualifying Round
| 14 August | Excelsior Stadium, Airdrie (H) | (Denmark) FC Nordsjælland | 1–2 | Sean O'Connor | BBC Sport |
| 26 August | Farum Park, Farum (A) | (Denmark) FC Nordsjælland | 1–2 | Robert Harris | BBC Sport |

=== Hibernian ===
| Date | Venue | Opponents | Score | Hibernian scorer(s) | Report |
Intertoto Cup Second round
| 6 July | Easter Road, Edinburgh (H) | (Sweden) IF Elfsborg | 0–2 | | BBC Sport |
| 12 July | Borås Arena, Borås (A) | (Sweden) IF Elfsborg | 0–2 | | BBC Sport |

== Scotland national team ==
=== Summary ===
Scotland began the season with a friendly against Northern Ireland. Northern Ireland were denied a victory by substitute goalkeeper Allan McGregor who saved a David Healy penalty after he brought down Warren Feeney inside the area. The draw meant that Scotland had yet to win under George Burley after three matches. The 2010 World Cup qualification campaign began against Macedonia. Scotland faced an early free-kick after Macedonia striker Goran Maznov fell theatrically on the edge of the penalty area as he was challenged by stand-in captain Stephen McManus. Craig Gordon was able to tip the resulting shot onto the post, but Ilčo Naumoski followed up to score five minutes into George Burley's first competitive match. Both teams had opportunities and Scotland were denied what appeared to be a clear penalty after James McFadden was brought down but the referee waved away the appeals and booked the striker for his protests. Scotland recovered from their opening defeat with a 2–1 victory away to Iceland in what was Burley's first win as manager. Kirk Broadfoot scored on his debut and James McFadden scored from a penalty, Iceland got back into the match after captain McManus handled in the box and Eiður Guðjohnsen scored from the resulting penalty. Scotland held out for the win despite having to play the last 13 minutes down to ten men.

Scotland drew 0–0 at home to Norway despite debutant striker Chris Iwelumo being presented with an open goal opportunity from just three yards, with the ball being crossed by Gary Naysmith from the left to the right side of the goal where Iwelumo is standing, he connects with the ball but somehow manages to put the ball wide of the left post. The draw left Scotland top of Group Nine but with just four points from three games, with the Netherlands having played just one. They next played a friendly against Argentina in Diego Maradona's first match as Argentina manager, Maxi Rodríguez scored the winning goal for the Argentines in a 1–0 win.

The Netherlands beat Scotland comfortably with goals from Klaas-Jan Huntelaar, Robin van Persie and Dirk Kuyt, depleted by injuries Burley was forced to field an inexperienced side Ross McCormack making his debut started along with Christophe Berra and Allan McGregor, who were making their first competitive starts. Scotland were denied a chance to get back into the match at 2–0 down when referee Massimo Busacca (who was suspended by his home federation) disallowed a seemingly perfectly good Gary Caldwell goal, minutes later the Netherlands were awarded a penalty from which Kuyt scored. Ross McCormack and Steven Fletcher both scored their first international goals in a 2–1 win over Iceland, McCormack opened the scoring after 39 minutes firing high into the net from an Alan Hutton cross, Indridi Sigurdsson levelled for the visitors after Pálmi Rafn Pálmason hit the post, Scotland though regrouped and after 65 minutes were awarded a debatable corner which McCormack took, the ball was headed into the danger area by McManus and Fletcher headed into the net. Scotland had gained seven points from five matches and occupied second spot in Group nine, three points clear of Iceland, four matches between the other teams and Scotland retained second position having played less matches than all other teams in the group meaning they were in prime position for second place with Holland already guaranteed first, However, only the second placed teams from eight of the nine qualifying groups would go into the play-offs.

=== Results ===
| Date | Venue | Opponents | Score | Competition | Scotland scorer(s) | Report |
|---|---|---|---|---|---|---|
| 20 August | Hampden Park, Glasgow (H) | Northern Ireland | 0–0 | Friendly | | BBC Sport |
| 6 September | Skopje City Stadium, Skopje (A) | North Macedonia | 0–1 | WCQ(9) | | BBC Sport |
| 10 September | Laugardalsvöllur, Reykjavík (A) | Iceland | 2–1 | WCQ(9) | Kirk Broadfoot, James McFadden (pen.) | BBC Sport |
| 11 October | Hampden Park, Glasgow (H) | Norway | 0–0 | WCQ(9) | | BBC Sport |
| 20 November | Hampden Park, Glasgow (H) | Argentina | 0–1 | Friendly | | BBC Sport |
| 28 March | Amsterdam Arena, Amsterdam (A) | Netherlands | 0–3 | WCQ(9) | | BBC Sport |
| 1 April | Hampden Park, Glasgow (H) | Iceland | 2–1 | WCQ(9) | Ross McCormack, Steven Fletcher | BBC Sport |

== Deaths ==
- 17 July – George Niven, 79, Rangers and Partick Thistle goalkeeper.
- 27 July – Bob Crampsey, 78, broadcaster and writer who contributed to sports programming on BBC Scotland, STV and Radio Clyde.
- 28 August – Bobby Cummings, 72, Aberdeen player.
- 31 August – Jamie Dolan, 39, Motherwell, Dundee United, Dunfermline Athletic, Livingston, Forfar Athletic and Partick Thistle player.
- 4 September – Tommy Johnston, 81, Kilmarnock player.
- 25 September – Jimmy Sirrel, 86, Celtic player.
- 2 October – John Sjoberg, 67, Leicester City player.
- 15 October – Eddie Thompson, 67, Dundee United chairman.
- 25 October – Ian McColl, 81, Rangers defender; Scotland manager.
- 27 October – Andy Young, 83, Raith Rovers and Celtic player.
- 3 November – Brooks Mileson, 60, Gretna owner.
- 4 November – Paddy Buckley, 83, St Johnstone, Aberdeen and Scotland player.
- 5 November – Ian Anderson, 54, Dundee and St Johnstone player.
- 27 November – Gil Heron, 87, first black player to play for Celtic.
- 6 December – John Cumming, 78, Hearts and Scotland player.
- 26 December – George Miller, 69, Dunfermline, Hearts and Falkirk player; Hamilton and Dunfermline manager.
- 28 December – Willie Clark, 90, Hibernian and St Johnstone defender.
- 6 January – Charlie Thomson, 78, Clyde goalkeeper.
- 7 January – Alfie Conn, Sr., 82, Hearts and Raith Rovers player; Gala Fairydean and Raith Rovers manager. Part of the Terrible Trio forward line.
- 2 March – Andy Bowman, 74, Hearts, Hamilton Academical and Hawick Royal Albert player.
- 28 March – Hughie Kelly, 85, Blackpool and Scotland player.
- 22 April – Billy Smith, 78, Aberdeen defender.
- 3 May – Bobby Campbell, 86, Falkirk and Scotland player; Dumbarton manager.
- 25 May – Billy Baxter, 70, Scottish defender who mostly played for Ipswich Town.
- 7 June – Willie Kilmarnock, 87, Motherwell and Airdrie player.
- 7 June – Gordon Lennon, 26, Stenhousemuir, Albion Rovers and Dumbarton player.
