= Lee Hollis =

Scottish footballer

Personal information
- Full name: Lee James Hollis
- Date of birth: 27 March 1986 (age 40)
- Place of birth: Lanark, Scotland
- Height: 6 ft 0 in (1.83 m)
- Position: Goalkeeper

Team information
- Current team: Greenock Morton (Goalkeeper Coach)

Youth career
- 2003–2004: Airdrie United

Senior career*
| Years | Team | Apps | (Gls) |
| 2004–2010 | Airdrie United | 26 | (0) |
| 2010–2014 | Motherwell | 18 | (0) |
| 2014 | Heart of Midlothian | 0 | (0) |
| ? | Benburb | | |
- * Club domestic league appearances and goals as of 16:49, 15 August 2014 (UTC)

Lee James Hollis (born 27 March 1986) is a Scottish footballer who played as a goalkeeper, and is known to have most recently play for Scottish Amateur side Benburb. He is now the goalie coach of Scottish Championship side Greenock Morton. He started his career at Airdrie United before signing for Lanarkshire derby rivals Motherwell.

== Career ==
=== Airdrie United ===
Hollis started his career at Airdrie United and in June 2007, signed a new contract for the next season and twelve month later, signed another new deal for the next season. On 17 January 2009, Hollis made his debut for the club, in a 1–1 draw against Dunfermline Athletic. Then, on 18 June 2009, Hollis signed another new deal for the next season.

Hollis had to wait until the latter months of the 2009–10 season for his chance. However, he could not prevent a First Division play-off semi-final defeat, meaning relegation to the second division. Hollis was then released, along with the rest of the squad, as Airdrie converted to part-time.

=== Motherwell ===
Hollis signed for Airdrie's Lanarkshire rivals Motherwell in 2010, and was in the squad for all of their Europa League games in 2010. He was promoted to second-choice keeper behind Darren Randolph after the departure of Michael Fraser in the early weeks of the 2010–11 season.

Hollis made his Motherwell debut in a 4–0 defeat to Celtic in the last match of the season. Despite the scoreline, he received praise for his performance in the match and made several good saves which kept the score down. Hollis was on the bench for Motherwell's 3–0 Scottish Cup Final defeat against Celtic.

On 10 June 2011, he signed a new one-year contract for the 2011–12 season, and was mainly used as second-choice keeper to Randolph, making just one start, in a 4–0 win over Clyde.

On 30 May 2012, Hollis signed a two-year extension, keeping him at Fir Park until 2014.

With Randolph serving a suspension, Hollis played his first match of the 2012–13 season, in the fourth round of Scottish Cup, in a 1–1 draw against Aberdeen. Ahead of the match, Manager Stuart McCall said he believes Hollis has the ability and has confidence in him to handle the match. Despite starting, Hollis says his place in the starting line-up will not last long. In the last game of the season, Hollis made an appearance, in a 2–0 defeat against St Johnstone.

In 2013–14 season, Randolph left the club to join Birmingham City, leaving Hollis as a senior goalkeeper at the club, but soon, the club signed a new goalkeeper, Gunnar Nielsen. Hollis started the season as first choice goalkeeper and made his European debut, in the third qualifying round of the Europa League, in a 2–0 loss against Russian side Kuban Krasnodar. Hollis played in the opening league match of the season, a 1–0 win over Hibernian, where he kept his first clean sheet of the season.

=== Hearts ===
Hollis signed a short-term deal with Heart of Midlothian on 15 August 2014, and was released on 1 September 2014.

=== Benburb ===
In July, Hollis signed for Benburb junior club.

== Career statistics ==
As of 15 August 2014

| Club | Season | League | | Cup | | League Cup | | Other | | Total | |
| Club | Season | Apps | Goals | Apps | Goals | Apps | Goals | Apps | Goals | Apps | Goals |
|---|---|---|---|---|---|---|---|---|---|---|---|
| Airdrie United | 2004–05 | 6 | 0 | 0 | 0 | 0 | 0 | 0 | 0 | 6 | 0 |
| Airdrie United | 2005–06 | 11 | 0 | 0 | 0 | 1 | 0 | 1 | 0 | 13 | 0 |
| Airdrie United | 2006–07 | 0 | 0 | 0 | 0 | 0 | 0 | 0 | 0 | 0 | 0 |
| Airdrie United | 2007–08 | 3 | 0 | 0 | 0 | 0 | 0 | 0 | 0 | 3 | 0 |
| Airdrie United | 2008–09 | 3 | 0 | 0 | 0 | 0 | 0 | 0 | 0 | 3 | 0 |
| Airdrie United | 2009–10 | 3 | 0 | 0 | 0 | 0 | 0 | 2 | 0 | 5 | 0 |
| Airdrie United | Total | 26 | 0 | 0 | 0 | 1 | 0 | 3 | 0 | 30 | 0 |
| Motherwell | 2010–11 | 1 | 0 | 0 | 0 | 0 | 0 | 0 | 0 | 1 | 0 |
| Motherwell | 2011–12 | 0 | 0 | 0 | 0 | 1 | 0 | 0 | 0 | 1 | 0 |
| Motherwell | 2012–13 | 3 | 0 | 1 | 0 | 0 | 0 | 0 | 0 | 4 | 0 |
| Motherwell | 2013–14 | 14 | 0 | 0 | 0 | 0 | 0 | 1 | 0 | 15 | 0 |
| Motherwell | Total | 18 | 0 | 1 | 0 | 1 | 0 | 1 | 0 | 21 | 0 |
| Heart of Midlothian | 2014–15 | 0 | 0 | 0 | 0 | 1 | 0 | 1 | 0 | 2 | 0 |
| Career total | | 44 | 0 | 1 | 0 | 3 | 0 | 5 | 0 | 53 | 0 |

== Honours ==
Airdrie United

- Scottish Challenge Cup: 2008–09

Motherwell

- Scottish Cup: 2011 (Runner-up)
