= 2008–09 Scottish Challenge Cup =

2008–09 ALBA Challenge Cup
Tournament details
- Country: Scotland
- Teams: 30

Final positions
- Champions: Airdrie United
- Runners-up: Ross County

Tournament statistics
- Matches played: 29
- Goals scored: 87 (3 per match)

The 2008–09 Scottish Challenge Cup, known as the ALBA Challenge Cup due to sponsorship reasons with MG Alba, was the 18th season of the competition, competed for by all 30 members of the Scottish Football League. The defending champions were St Johnstone, who defeated Dunfermline Athletic by 3–2 in the 2007 final; and lost 2–1 to Ross County in the First round.

The competition was won by Airdrie United who defeated Ross County 3–2 on penalties following a 2–2 draw after extra time, the winning penalty was scored by Marc Smyth.

== Schedule ==
Round	First match date	Fixtures	Clubs
First round	26 July 2008	14	30 → 16
Second round	12 August 2008	8	16 → 8
Quarter-finals	7 September 2008	4	8 → 4
Semi-finals	12 October 2008	2	4 → 2
Final	16 November 2008	1	2 → 1

== First round ==
The First round draw was conducted on 29 May 2008. Holders St Johnstone were drawn against Ross County away from home.

=== North and East Region ===
Raith Rovers received a random bye to the second round.

26 July 2008	Alloa Athletic	2–1	Dundee	Recreation Park, Alloa
15:00	Townsley 59'; Stevenson 83'	Report	Antoine-Curier 88'	Attendance: 793; Referee: Chris Boyle

26 July 2008	Arbroath	1–2	Forfar Athletic	Gayfield Park, Forfar
15:00	Scott 44'	Report	Kilgannon 62' (pen.); McLeish 71' (pen.)	Attendance: 563; Referee: Euan Norris

26 July 2008	Brechin City	0–1	East Fife	Glebe Park, Brechin
15:00	Nimmo (red card) 78'	Report	Templeman 69'	Referee: S Nicholls

26 July 2008	Dunfermline Athletic	3–0	Stirling Albion	East End Park, Dunfermline
15:00	Burke 4'; Phinn 61'; Williamson 74'	Report		Attendance: 1,340; Referee: Eddie Smith

26 July 2008	Elgin City	0–2	Cowdenbeath	Borough Briggs, Elgin
15:00		Report	McGregor 13'; McQuade 80'	Attendance: 379; Referee: G Salmond

26 July 2008	Peterhead	6–0	Montrose	Balmoor, Peterhead
15:00	Bavidge 24', 78'; Cumming 45' (own goal); Gunn 52', 58', 68' (pen.)	Report		Attendance: 503; Referee: Craig Charleston

26 July 2008	Ross County	2–1	St Johnstone	Victoria Park, Dingwall
15:00	Winters 53'; Higgins 65'	Report	Samuel 84'	Attendance: 2,365; Referee: Craig Thomson

=== South and West Region ===
Greenock Morton received a random bye to the second round.

26 July 2008	Airdrie United	3–2	Dumbarton	Excelsior Stadium, Airdrie
15:00	Noble 53'; Cardle 58' di Giacomo 75'	Report	Clark 25'; Carcary 43'	Attendance: 808; Referee: Calum Murray

26 July 2008	Berwick Rangers	1–5	Queen of the South	Shielfield Park, Berwick
15:00	Little 47'	Report	O'Connor 12', 58'; Kean 31', 65'; Barr 80'	Attendance: 655; Referee: J McKendrick

26 July 2008	Clyde	2–0	Annan Athletic	Broadwood Stadium, Cumbernauld
15:00	Trouten 61' (pen.), 74'	Report		Attendance: 700; Referee: Steven O'Reilly

26 July 2008	Livingston	4–0	Stranraer	Almondvale Stadium, Livingston
15:00	Griffiths 33', 72'; Hamill 67'; McParland 70'	Report	Nicoll (red card) 81'	Referee: C Brown

26 July 2008	Partick Thistle	2–1	Queen's Park	Firhill Stadium, Glasgow
15:00	Gray 7'; Roberts 9'	Report	Henry 17'; Sinclair (red card) 66'	Attendance: 1,382; Referee: Stephen Finnie

26 July 2008	Stenhousemuir	0–1	Albion Rovers	Ochilview Park, Stenhousemuir
15:00		Report	Donnelly 87' (pen.)	Attendance: 323; Referee: B Maddenn

27 July 2008	East Stirlingshire	2–1	Ayr United	Ochilview Park, Stenhousemuir
15:00	Richardson 86'; Rodgers 89'	Report	Williams 15'	Attendance: 761; Referee: A Muir

== Second round ==
The Second round draw was conducted on 30 July 2008.

12 August 2008	Alloa Athletic	0–2	Clyde	Recreation Park, Alloa
19:45		Report	Clarke 58'; Gibson 76'	Attendance: 414; Referee: Iain Brines

12 August 2008	Cowdenbeath	3–2	Albion Rovers	Central Park, Cowdenbeath
19:30	McQuade 8'; Gemmell 54'; Fairbairn 89'	Report	Barr 30'; Martin 75'	Attendance: 204; Referee: Crawford Allan

12 August 2008	Livingston	1–0	Forfar Athletic	Almondvale Stadium, Livingston
19:45	Griffiths 51'	Report		Attendance: 800; Referee: Calum Murray

12 August 2008	Partick Thistle	4 – 2 (a.e.t.)	Peterhead	Firhill Stadium, Glasgow
19:30	Donnelly 52'; McKeown 92', 115'; Harkins 112'	Report	Gunn 23'; Kozmanski 103'	Attendance: 1,133; Referee: Steve Conroy

12 August 2008	Raith Rovers	1–2	Ross County	Stark's Park, Kirkcaldy
19:45	Weir 72'	Report	Keddie 52', 54'	Attendance: 1,080; Referee: William Collum

13 August 2008	East Fife	0–2	Airdrie United	Bayview Stadium, Methil
19:45		Report	Lynch 10'; Smith 84'	Attendance: 606; Referee: Mike Tumilty

13 August 2008	East Stirlingshire	0–3	Greenock Morton	Ochilview Park, Stenhousemuir
19:30		Report	Masterton 22'; McGuffie 32', 53'	Attendance: 753; Referee: Stevie O'Reilly

20 August 2008	Dunfermline Athletic	0–2	Queen of the South	East End Park, Dunfermline
19:45		Report	Kean 9'; O'Connor 75'	Attendance: 1,373; Referee: Michael McCurry

== Quarter-finals ==
The Quarter-final draw was conducted on 14 August 2008.

7 September 2008
15:00

Clyde	0–1	Ross County
McGregor (red card) 45'	Report	Craig 25'

Broadwood Stadium, Cumbernauld
Attendance: 756
Referee: Steve Conroy

7 September 2008
15:00

Cowdenbeath	1–2	Airdrie United
Fairbairn 79'; Baxter (red card) 84'	Report	di Giacomo 53' 75'

Central Park, Cowdenbeath
Attendance: 643
Referee: Stephen Finnie

7 September 2008
15:00

Livingston	0–2	Partick Thistle
	Report	Turner 75'; Twaddle 78'

Almondvale Stadium, Livingston
Referee: David Somers

7 September 2008
15:00

Queen of the South	0–2	Greenock Morton
	Report	Wake 48'; McGuffie 77'

Palmerston Park, Dumfries
Attendance: 2,991
Referee: William Collum

== Semi-finals ==
The Semi-final draw was conducted on 11 September 2008.

12 October 2008
14:00

Partick Thistle	0–1	Airdrie United
	Report	Di Giacomo 4'

Firhill Stadium, Glasgow
Attendance: 2,761
Referee: David Somers

12 October 2008
15:00

Ross County	4–1	Greenock Morton
Craig 6'; Daal 42' 62'; Dowie 84'	Report	McManus (red card) 55'; Weatherson 77'

Victoria Park, Dingwall
Attendance: 1,396
Referee: Mike Tumilty

== Final ==
16 November 2008
15:00

Airdrie United	2 – 2 (a.e.t.) ( 3 – 2 pen.)	Ross County
McKenna 80'; Dowie 103' (o.g.)	Report	Nixon 59' (o.g.); Higgins 113'
Penalties
Lynch (penalty missed); McLaughlin (penalty scored); Hazley (penalty missed); McDonald (penalty scored); Smyth (penalty scored)	3–2	(penalty missed) Winters; (penalty scored) Higgins; (penalty scored) Hart; (penalty missed) Morrison; (penalty missed) Scott

McDiarmid Park, Perth
Attendance: 4,091
Referee: Calum Murray

== Media coverage ==
The Partick Thistle v Airdrie United semi-final was shown live and the final was shown live on BBC Alba.
