= Willie Clark (footballer, born 1918) =

Scottish footballer

Personal information
- Date of birth: 27 September 1918
- Place of birth: Cockenzie, East Lothian, Scotland
- Date of death: 28 December 2008 (aged 90)
- Place of death: Pathhead, Midlothian, Scotland
- Position: Right back

Youth career
- Bonnyrigg Rose Athletic

Senior career*
Years	Team	Apps	(Gls)
1938–1953	Hibernian	17	(1)
1953–1955	St Johnstone	32	(0)
Total		49	(1)
- * Club domestic league appearances and goals

Willie Clark (27 September 1918 – 28 December 2008) was a Scottish footballer who played in the Scottish Football League for Hibernian and St Johnstone.

His football career was interrupted by the Second World War, during which he served in the Royal Air Force.
