= Stephen McKenna (footballer) =

Scottish footballer

Personal information
- Date of birth: 25 November 1985 (age 40)
- Place of birth: Glasgow, Scotland
- Position: Midfielder

Team information
- Current team: Cumnock Juniors

Senior career*
Years	Team	Apps	(Gls)
2002–2003	Rangers	0	(0)
2003–2009	Airdrie United	137	(2)
2009–2015	Queen of the South	118	
2016–????	Cumnock Juniors		
- * Club domestic league appearances and goals

Stephen McKenna is a Scottish former footballer who played as a defensive midfielder. He won the Scottish Challenge Cup in 2008 with Airdrie United and in 2013 with Queen of the South also winning a divisional title with the Queen's that season. McKenna retired from senior football aged 29 to focus on a career outside the game.

== Playing career ==
=== Airdrie ===
McKenna joined Airdrie United from Rangers in 2003 and made over 150 first team appearances for the Diamonds. A high point was when he scored in the 2008 Scottish Challenge Cup Final. McKenna's team won on penalties against Ross County.

=== Queen of the South ===
On 6 August 2009, McKenna was announced as a new signing on the website of Dumfries club Queen of the South. He played 28 first team league games that season scoring on 16 February 2010 in the 3–0 home win against Ayr United at Palmerston Park. He also played in three cup games including the 2–1 defeat at home against Rangers in the Scottish League Cup. The season after McKenna played in the postponed 2010 Scottish Challenge Cup Final defeat to Ross County.

McKenna scored a goal from 30 yards on 26 November 2011 in the 2–2 draw away to Morton. He scored a goal from a similar distance the following week in the 4–1 home win over Ayr United.

McKenna was an integral part of the Queen's side to win a league and cup double in 2012/13. McKenna and his teammates romped away to win the Scottish Second Division title building an unassailable lead before the end of March. Less than two weeks later McKenna and co won the Scottish League Challenge Cup Final beating Partick Thistle on penalties.

McKenna left senior football at the end of season 2014/15 to work on a professional career outside football. He was 29 at the time.

=== Cumnock Juniors ===
McKenna come out of retired at join junior club Cumnock Juniors.

== Honours ==
Airdrie United

- 2008-09 Scottish Challenge Cup Winner

Queen of the South

- 2012–13 Scottish Division Two Champions
- 2012-13 Scottish Challenge Cup Winner
