= Chris Boyle =

Scottish/Australian academic

Professor Chris Boyle
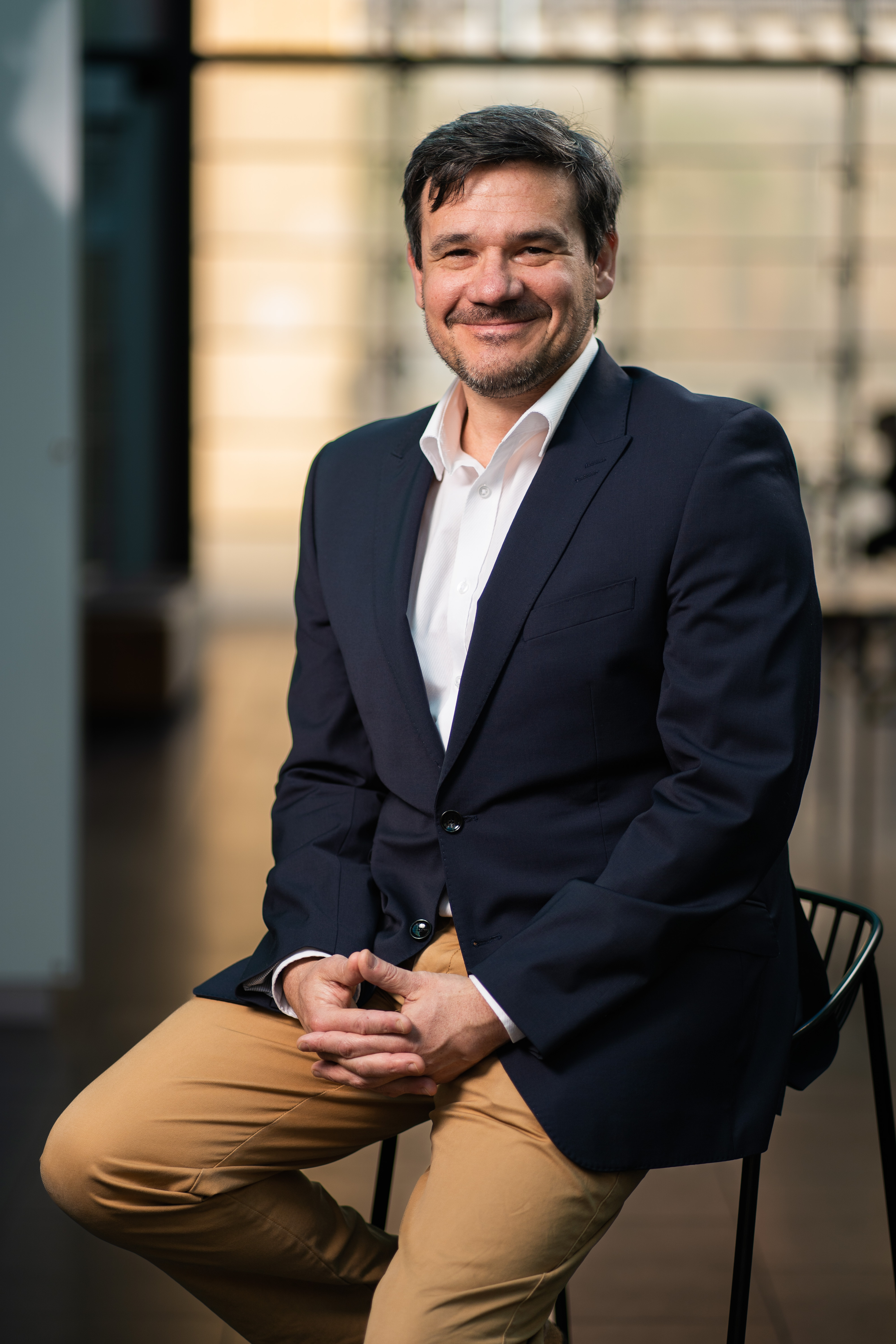
- Born: 11 August 1972; Glasgow, Scotland
- Other name: Christopher Boyle
- Citizenship: British Australian
- Education: University of Dundee; University of Glasgow; University of Strathclyde; Open University
- Known for: Educational psychology Labelling; Special and inclusive education Beliefs in Santa Claus
- Scientific career
- Fields: Psychology, education, special education, inclusive education
- Workplaces: University of Adelaide

Chris Boyle
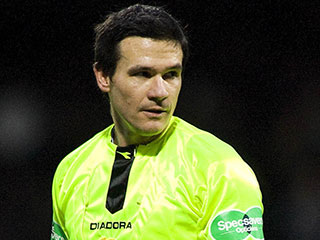
- Chris Boyle as a Scottish referee
- Full name: Christopher Boyle
- Born: 11 August 1972 (age 54); Glasgow, Scotland

Domestic
Years	League	Role
1999–2009	Scottish Football League / Scottish Premier League	Referee
2010–2011	A-League	Referee

Professor Christopher Boyle (born 11 August 1972 in Glasgow, Scotland) is a Fellow of the British Psychological Society, Senior Fellow of the Higher Education Academy and professor of Psychology and Inclusion (education) at the University of Adelaide. He has previously been an association football referee who refereed in the Australian A-League and the Scottish Premier League. Boyle is a qualified psychologist working in the UK and in Australia. He has written extensively on subjects in psychology and inclusive education. He is a respected academic and has authored over 150 publications on these topics.

He edited the Australian Psychological Society's journal The Australian Educational and Developmental Psychologist between 2012 and 2017.

== Refereeing career ==
Boyle has officiated matches in the Scottish Premier League and Scottish Football League, making him one of the most experienced referees in the A-League. He made headlines in his debut match of his A-League career when he officiated the game between Melbourne Victory and North Queensland Fury at AAMI Park. During the game, he awarded three penalties (two to Melbourne, and one to North Queensland), and handed out two red cards to North Queensland players Chris Grossman and Eric Akoto.

== Academic career ==
He has a wide and varied career and has lectured on professional training programmes for educational psychologists at the University of Dundee, Monash University, and the University of Exeter. He has also lectured in subject areas of child development and psychology, inclusive and special education with the Open University, Charles Sturt University, and the University of New England, Australia. He completed his PhD in psychology and education at the University of Dundee.

== Media coverage ==
Boyle's academic work regularly receives media attention, and he is often asked to contribute to articles and TV and radio programmes around the world.

== Published books ==
- Inclusive Education: Global Issues and Controversies (with Joanna Anderson, Angela Page and Sofia Mavropoulou)
- Pathways to Belonging: Contemporary Research in School Belonging (with Kelly Allen)
- Equality in education: Fairness and inclusion (with Hongzhi Zhang and Philip Wing Keung Chan)
- Boyle, C., & Gamble, N. (2014).
- Boyle, C. (Ed.) (2013).
- Boyle, C., & Topping, K. (Eds.) (2012).
