= Stephen Robertson (footballer) =

Scottish footballer

Personal information
- Full name: Stephen Robertson
- Date of birth: 16 March 1977 (age 49)
- Place of birth: Glasgow, Scotland
- Position: Goalkeeper

Senior career*
Years	Team	Apps	(Gls)
1994–2001	St. Johnstone	13	(0)
1998–1999	→ Hamilton Academical (loan)	6	(0)
2001–2002	Clydebank	11	(0)
2005–2010	Airdrie United	162	(0)
2010–2011	Alloa Athletic	16	(0)
2011–?	Kirkintilloch Rob Roy		

International career
1998	Scotland U21	2	(0)
- * Club domestic league appearances and goals as of 19:00, 7 March 2013 (UTC)

Stephen Robertson (born 16 March 1977 in Glasgow) is a Scottish former professional footballer who played as a goalkeeper.

Robertson began his career at St. Johnstone, where he progressed through the youth system along with Danny Griffin and Stuart McCluskey, sometimes playing in outfield positions, and eventually made thirteen league appearances for the first team. As an understudy to St Johnstone's first-choice goalkeeper Alan Main, Robertson made his Scottish Premier League debut on 21 February 1998, against Aberdeen. He was called up to the Scotland under-21 squad in March 2000.

Robertson ended his seven-year association with St Johnstone in May 2001 when he was released on a free transfer. He moved to Clydebank. After one year there, he joined Stranraer on trial, before joining Airdrie United. He then moved on to Alloa Athletic in June 2010. He joined Junior side Kirkintilloch Rob Roy in August 2011.

In June 2020, Robertson was announced as the coach of Yoker Athletic's newly launched under-20 development squad.

== Honours ==
Airdrie United

- Scottish Challenge Cup: 2008–09
