= Darren Smith (footballer, born 1986) =

Scottish footballer

Personal information
- Full name: Darren James Smith
- Date of birth: 6 December 1986 (age 39)
- Place of birth: Edinburgh, Scotland
- Height: 5 ft 10 in (1.78 m)
- Position: Midfielder

Team information
- Current team: Dunbar United F.C.

Youth career
- 2006–2007: Hibernian

Senior career*
Years	Team	Apps	(Gls)
2007–2010	Airdrie United	70	(2)
2011	Albion Rovers	1	(0)
2011–12	Berwick Rangers	4	(0)
2012–2013	Kelty Hearts		
2013–2014	Ballingry Rovers		
2014–2015	Bonnyrigg Rose		
2015–2016	Lothian Thistle		
2016–2021	Gala Fairydean		
2021-2023	Lothian Thistle		
2023-	Dunbar United F.C.		
- * Club domestic league appearances and goals as of 23:55, 29 July 2014 (UTC)

Darren Smith (born 6 December 1986) is a Scottish footballer who plays for East of Scotland League side Dunbar United F.C. .

Smith, who began his career with Hibernian, signed for Airdrie United in 2007. He was part of the Airdrie side who won the Scottish Challenge Cup in 2008. Smith was dropped by manager Kenny Black soon afterwards, but was recalled when it was announced that Steven McDougall and Joe Cardle had signed pre-contract agreements with Dunfermline.

Smith was released by Airdrie in 2010, and then spent a few months out of the game. He signed for Albion Rovers on a short-term deal in February 2011.

In July 2011, Smith signed for Berwick Rangers.

After leaving Berwick at the end of the 2011–12 season, Smith joined Scottish Junior side Kelty Hearts, then a year later signed for fellow junior club Ballingry Rovers. On 25 July 2014, he moved to another junior club, Bonnyrigg Rose.

In August 2021 Smith joined East of Scotland Premier League side Dunbar United F.C.

== Honours ==
Airdrie United

- Scottish Challenge Cup: 2008–09
