= Roberto Landi =

Italian footballer (born 1956)

Personal information
- Date of birth: 2 January 1956 (age 70)
- Place of birth: Forlì, Italy
- Position: Goalkeeper

Senior career*
Years	Team	Apps	(Gls)
- Piacenza
- Ravenna
- Modena
- Piacenza
- Siena
- Vancouver Whitecaps
- Chicago Sting
- Kaizer Chiefs
- New York Cosmos
- Cervia
- Morciano
- Ospedaletto

Managerial career
- 1992–1995: Marignano
- 1998–2000: Georgia U21
- 2001: Lithuania U21
- 2005: National Bucharest
- 2005–2006: Qatar U21
- 2006: FC Sopron
- 2008: Livingston
- 2009: Union SG
- 2011–2012: Liberia
- 2012–2013: Al Tirsana Tripoli
- 2016–2017: Rimini (team manager)
- 2017–2018: City of Lusaka
- 2018: FC Kolkheti-1913 Poti
- 2019–2020: CAPS United
- 2020: Ashanti Gold
- * Club domestic league appearances and goals

Roberto Landi (born 2 January 1956) is an Italian football manager and former player.

== Playing career ==
Landi was born in Forlì. A goalkeeper, he joined the Piacenza youth system in 1966 and later joined the first team, then playing in Serie C1 division. He later moved to Modena as second-choice goalkeeper, and then played also for Ravenna and Siena, before to leave Italy to join the North American Soccer League in 1979, at the age of 23. During his North American time, he played for Vancouver Whitecaps and Chicago Sting, before signing for South African side Kaizer Chiefs, and returning in the United States with New York Cosmos in 1983. He then returned in Italy and played for a number of amateur sides before retiring at the age of 30.

== Coaching career ==
Landi served as goalkeeping coach for the United States national team during their 1990 and 1994 FIFA World Cup campaigns. From 1992 to 1995 he served as head coach of Italian amateur team Marignano. In 1998, he became head coach of the Georgia U21 national team, and later filled the same position for the Lithuania U21 in 2001. He obtained a UEFA Pro License in 2003, and was part of Messina managing staff in their 2002–03 campaign.

In January 2005 he became head coach of National Bucharest, where he achieved a record 17 wins in a row. He left the post in September 2005, citing personal reasons, later being appointed as Qatar U21 head coach. He then briefly moved in Hungary, serving as FC Sopron head for three matches in the 2006–07 season before being sacked for losing their local derby to Győr.

In October 2007 he was linked with the managing position at Port Vale F.C. through his agent Bryan Yeubrey.

In June 2008 Landi was linked with Scottish First Division side Livingston He was appointed manager of the club on 11 June, August 2008 best coach of the month.

In June 2009, he was unveiled as new head coach of Royale Union Saint-Gilloise. He was however dismissed later in December due to money problems with the club.

He was hired in January 2011 to be the Liberia national team, but was sacked in February 2012. He was linked to the position again in May 2014.

The Italian was the manager of Zambian side City of Lusaka between 2017 and 2018. During his time in Lusaka, he was publicly critical of refereeing in Zambia.

He was appointed manager of Georgian side FC Kolkheti-1913 Poti for the 2018-19 season but left the role after three months.

In September 2019, Landi was appointed manager of CAPS United in Zimbabwe. The owners said the aim of the appointment was to utilise Landi's overseas contacts in order to export their talent abroad.

His next destination was Ghana. He was appointed manager of Ashanti Gold in February 2020, but did not begin his role until September due to the COVID-19 pandemic. However, Landi left the club in October 2020 claiming the club had refused to pay him since being appointed manager.

Landi applied for the Nigeria managers job in August 2024. He was publicly critical of the NFF for their handling of the selection process.

== Managerial statistics ==
As of 3 October 2016

Managerial record by team and tenure
Team	From	To	Record					Ref
Team	From	To	P	W	D	L	Win %	Ref
Național București	20 June 2004	30 May 2006	60	30	10	20	50.0	
Qatar U21	1 June 2006	1 June 2007	10	3	1	6	30.0	
FC Sopron	18 July 2007	19 June 2008	30	11	5	14	36.7	
Livingston	1 July 2008	1 January 2009	21	13	5	3	61.9	
Liberia	19 January 2011	18 June 2013	18	6	5	7	33.3	
Al Tirsana Libya	July 2013	February 2014	25	14	8	3	56.0	
Total			164	77	34	53	47.0	—
