= Mark Smyth =

English footballer

Personal information
- Date of birth: 9 January 1985 (age 41)
- Place of birth: Liverpool, England
- Height: 5 ft 11 in (1.80 m)
- Positions: Midfielder; winger

Senior career*
Years	Team	Apps	(Gls)
2002–2005	Liverpool	0	(0)
2005–2006	Accrington Stanley	0	(0)
2006–2007	Vauxhall Motors		
2007–2008	Bangor City	24	(8)
2008–2009	Leigh Genesis		
2009	Witton Albion		
2009–2013	Bangor City	31	(7)
2013	Prestatyn Town	9	(2)
2013	Gap Connah's Quay	5	(1)
2014	Prestatyn Town		
Total		69	(18)

International career
2002	England U17	8	(3)
2003	England U18		
2004	England U19		
2005	England U20	1	(0)
- * Club domestic league appearances and goals as of 15:55, 4 January 2014. (UTC)

Mark Smyth (born 9 January 1985) is an English football midfield player. Smyth started his career playing for Liverpool. Smyth made one appearance for Liverpool, coming on as a substitute in a Football League Cup quarter final win at Tottenham Hotspur in December 2004.

== Career ==
He was released from the Anfield club at the end of the 2004/2005 season. He was signed by Accrington Stanley, but he soon moved to Vauxhall Motors.

In December 2006 Mark signed for Bangor City in the Welsh Premier, then managed by Steve Bleasdale. He made a dozen league appearances for City by the end of the season and was part of the first team squad again during pre-season 2007–08; he was released in 2008 and had a trial with Chester City before signing for Leigh Genesis F.C. He then moved on again to Cheshire league side Witton Albion, before re-signing for Bangor City in 2009.

Mark helped Bangor City win the Welsh Premier League in 2011, as well as reach the Welsh Cup Final for the fourth consecutive year.

Mark was released from his contract at Bangor City at the start of 2013 and signed for Prestatyn Town on a free transfer. Smyth was then subsequently cup-tied for the Welsh Cup Final as Prestatyn met Bangor City, which meant he failed to receive a winners medal.

Smyth then signed for Gap Connah's Quay at the start of the 2013/14 season. In the following January transfer window Smyth joined fellow Welsh Premier League side and former club Prestatyn Town until the end of the season.
