= David Nixon (footballer) =

Scottish footballer

Personal information
- Date of birth: 9 July 1988 (age 38)
- Place of birth: Paisley, Scotland
- Position: Defender

Team information
- Current team: Airdrie United

Senior career*
Years	Team	Apps	(Gls)
2005–2008	Motherwell	0	(0)
2007	→ Queen of the South (loan)	1	(0)
2008–	Airdrie United	38	(3)
- * Club domestic league appearances and goals as of 30 March 2010

David Nixon (born 9 July 1988 in Paisley, Scotland) is a Scottish defender footballer for Airdrie United.

Nixon began his career with Motherwell, progressing through their youth system. In October 2007, Nixon joined Queen of the South on a three-month loan and returned to Fir Park in January 2008.

Nixon joined Airdrie United in July 2008.

Nixon was part of the Airdrie United side who put Hearts out of the CIS Insurance Cup in 2008. After a stunning performance he won the 'Man Of The Match' award.

== Honours ==
Airdrie United

- Scottish Challenge Cup: 2008–09
