= Andy Dowie =

Scottish footballer (born 1983)

Personal information
- Full name: Andrew John Dowie
- Date of birth: 25 March 1983 (age 43)
- Place of birth: Bellshill, Scotland
- Height: 6 ft 1 in (1.85 m)
- Position: Centre-back

Team information
- Current team: Caledonian Braves

Senior career*
Years	Team	Apps	(Gls)
1999–2004	Rangers	1	(0)
2004	→ Brechin City (loan)	15	(0)
2004–2005	Partick Thistle	27	(0)
2005–2006	Stranraer	22	(0)
2006–2009	Ross County	99	(5)
2009–2013	Dunfermline Athletic	118	(2)
2013	Partick Thistle	5	(1)
2013–2017	Queen of the South	118	(4)
2017–2019	Dumbarton	50	(2)
2019	Edusport Academy		
2019–2020	Cumnock Juniors		
2020–	Caledonian Braves		

International career^{‡}
2004–2005	Scotland U21	8	(0)
- * Club domestic league appearances and goals as of 11:00, 1 July 2020 (UTC) ‡ National team caps and goals as of 2 July 2013

Andrew John Dowie (born 25 March 1983 in Bellshill) is a Scottish professional footballer who plays for Caledonian Braves. Dowie is predominantly a centre-back and played for Rangers, Brechin City, Partick Thistle, Stranraer, Ross County, Dunfermline Athletic, Queen of the South and Dumbarton in the SPFL.

== Career ==
Dowie started his career as a youth with Rangers, during which time he had a loan spell at Brechin City in 2004 and scored in a friendly win against Linfield.

After being released by Rangers, having only made one league appearance for the club, he signed for Partick Thistle. At Partick he scored his first career goal in a Scottish League Cup tie against future club Dunfermline. On 13 April 2005, along with teammate Steve Fulton, he was released by Partick Thistle for "a severe breach of club discipline."

Dowie then signed for Stranraer and following the club's relegation to the Scottish Second Division, joined Ross County for the 2006–07 season. While at Ross County he scored in the 2006 Scottish Challenge Cup Final as they went on to beat Clyde on penalties.

After three years at Ross County, Dowie signed for Dunfermline Athletic in May 2009. Whilst at Dunfermline, the club won the 2010–11 Scottish First Division and were promoted to the Scottish Premier League, however they were relegated the following season. During the 2012–13 season, Dunfermline entered administration, with Dowie amongst the players made redundant. On 29 March 2013, he signed for a second time in his career with Partick Thistle. Dowie's contract was not renewed at the end of the 2012–13 season.

Dowie signed for Queen of the South on 1 July 2013. Prior to kick-off in the 1–0 home victory over Hibernian on 2 March 2016, Dowie was presented with a club memento to recognise completion of 100 first team appearances for the club. His contract with Queens wasn't renewed in May 2017, and so he left the club having made 147 appearances across 4 seasons.

On 12 June 2017, Dowie joined rival Scottish Championship club Dumbarton on a one-year contract. He was announced as the club's new captain on 12 July 2017, replacing Darren Barr who had left the club to join Morton. In his first season at the club he was named as the club's Player of the Year and captained the team during the 2017–18 Scottish Challenge Cup final. He signed a new deal in May 2018 but left the club to pursue a career outside football in January 2019 after 74 appearances and 2 goals. In February 2019 Dowie featured for Lowland Football League side Edusport Academy for whom he is also a coach.

Dowie played a season with Cumnock before agreeing to rejoin Caledonian Braves in June 2020.

== Career statistics ==
As of 18:28, 12 January 2019 (UTC)

Appearances and goals by club, season and competition
Club	Season	League			Scottish Cup		League Cup		Other		Total	
Club	Season	Division	Apps	Goals	Apps	Goals	Apps	Goals	Apps	Goals	Apps	Goals
Rangers	2001–02	Premier League	1	0	0	0	0	0	0	0	1	0
Brechin City	2003–04	First Division	15	0	0	0	0	0	0	0	15	0
Partick Thistle	2004–05	First Division	27	0	2	0	2	1	2 (Note: Appearances in the Scottish Challenge Cup)	0	33	1
Stranraer	2005–06	First Division	22	0	1	0	2	0	1	0	26	0
Ross County	2006–07	First Division	36	2	1	0	2	0	3	1	42	3
Ross County	2007–08	Second Division	34	2	3	1	2	1	2	0	41	4
Ross County	2008–09	First Division	29	1	1	0	1	0	3	1	34	2
Ross County	Ross County total		99	5	5	1	5	1	8	2	117	9
Dunfermline Athletic	2009–10	First Division	32	0	3	0	1	0	1	0	37	0
Dunfermline Athletic	2010–11	First Division	26	0	0	0	2	0	0	0	28	0
Dunfermline Athletic	2011–12	Premier League	30	0	2	0	2	0	—		34	0
Dunfermline Athletic	2012–13	First Division	30	2	2	0	2	0	1	0	35	2
Dunfermline Athletic	Dunfermline total		118	2	7	0	7	0	2	0	134	2
Partick Thistle	2012–13	First Division	5	1	—		—		—		5	1
Queen of the South	2013–14	Championship	28	2	0	0	3	0	3 (Note: One appearance in the Scottish Challenge Cup and two in the Premiership play-offs)	0	34	2
Queen of the South	2014–15	Championship	34	2	3	0	2	0	3 (Note: One appearance and a goal in the Scottish Challenge Cup; two appearances in the Premiership play-offs)	1	42	3
Queen of the South	2015–16	Championship	29	0	1	0	2	0	1	0	33	0
Queen of the South	2016–17	Championship	27	0	1	0	6	1	4	0	38	1
Queen of the South	Queen of the South total		118	4	5	0	13	1	11	1	147	6
Dumbarton	2017–18	Championship	31	0	3	0	4	0	10	0	48	0
Dumbarton	2018–19	League One	19	2	1	0	4	0	2	0	26	2
Dumbarton	Dumbarton Total		50	2	4	0	8	0	12	0	74	2
Career total			455	14	17	1	30	3	34	3	552	21

== See also ==
- Dunfermline Athletic F.C. season 2009–10 | 2010–11 | 11–12 | 12–13
- Partick Thistle F.C. season 2012–13

== Honours ==
Ross County

- Scottish Challenge Cup: 2006–07
