= Stuart Noble =

Scottish footballer

Personal information
- Full name: Stuart William Noble
- Date of birth: 14 October 1983 (age 43)
- Place of birth: Edinburgh, Scotland
- Position: Striker

Team information
- Current team: Langlee Amateurs

Senior career*
Years	Team	Apps	(Gls)
2002–2005	Fulham	0	(0)
2003	→ St Johnstone (loan)	12	(5)
2004	→ Woking (loan)	5	(1)
2004	→ Torquay United (loan)	3	(0)
2005	→ Northampton Town (loan)	4	(0)
2005–2006	East Fife	11	(4)
2006–2007	Gala Fairydean	23	(20)
2007–2009	Airdrie United	42	(21)
2009	→ Alloa Athletic (loan)	14	(6)
2009–2011	Alloa Athletic	52	(23)
2011–2013	Berwick Rangers	39	(9)
2013–2018	Gala Fairydean Rovers	119	(89)
2021-	Langlee Amateurs	5	(4)
- * Club domestic league appearances and goals as of 23:56, 24 February 2014 (UTC)

Stuart William Noble (born 14 October 1983 in Edinburgh) is a Scottish professional footballer who plays for Scottish Lowland Football League side Langlee Amateurs.

== Career ==
Noble began his career as a trainee with Fulham, turning professional in January 2002. He spent three and a half years as a professional with Fulham, but failed to make a single first team appearance. He had loan spells with St Johnstone (January–May 2003), Woking (May–April 2004), Torquay United (August–September 2004) and Northampton Town (February 2005) before being released by Fulham at the end of the season.

He had a trial with Partick Thistle and joined East Fife at the end of August 2005. He played 12 times for the club, his last game coming in the 3–0 Scottish Cup defeat at home to Peterhead in December 2005 and he left the club in January 2006. He remained without a club for the remainder of the season as he recovered from a back injury.

In May 2006, the Border Telegraph reported that he was to sign for Scottish non-league side Gala Fairydean of the East of Scotland Football League. In his only season at the club he was top scorer with 20 goals in 23 games.

He signed for Second Division side Airdrie United in the summer of 2007 following a trial and was given a contract extension in June 2008, despite interest from Dundee.

In January 2009, Noble had a loan spell at Alloa Athletic, then on 29 May 2009, he signed for Alloa on a permanent basis. During his time at Alloa, Noble won the Scottish Football League Player of the Month award for February 2010.

On the eve of the 2011–12 season, Noble signed for Berwick Rangers. On 13 February 2013, he left Berwick by mutual consent.

On 2 July 2013, it was announced that Noble had signed for Lowland Football League club Gala Fairydean Rovers, linking up with his brother Steven, who is the club's manager.

== Honours ==
Airdrie United

- Scottish Challenge Cup: 2008–09
