= Richie Hart =

Scottish footballer (born 1978)

Personal information
- Full name: Richard Hart
- Date of birth: 30 March 1978 (age 48)
- Place of birth: Inverness, Scotland
- Height: 1.78 m (5 ft 10 in)
- Position: Midfielder

Senior career*
Years	Team	Apps	(Gls)
1996–1999	Ross County	12	(1)
1999–2002	Brora Rangers		
2002–2008	Inverness Caledonian Thistle	142	(11)
2008–2009	Ross County	33	(3)
2009–2010	Dundee	26	(0)
2010–2011	Hibernians	21	(1)
2011–2012	Ettifaq		
2012–2015	Brora Rangers		
- * Club domestic league appearances and goals as of 15:12, 19 July 2011 (UTC)

Richard Hart (born 30 March 1978) is a Scottish former footballer who played as a midfielder for Brora Rangers.

== Career ==
Born in Inverness, he began his career with Ross County in 1996. Having spent three years there, Hart spent another three with Brora Rangers, before joining Inverness Caledonian Thistle in 2002.

He played for his home town club for six years and represented them in the Scottish Premier League, before returning to Ross County for a season.

Hart joined Dundee in 2009, and played for them for one season before moving to Maltese Premier League side Hibernians.

After leaving Malta, Hart joined Saudi Arabian side Ettifaq FC.

Hart rejoined Brora Rangers on a two-year deal in June 2012. In 2014 Hart was injured and did not return to play for Brora Rangers.

== Honours ==
Dundee

- Scottish Challenge Cup: 2009–10
