= Scott McLaughlin (footballer) =

Scottish footballer (born 1984)

Personal information
- Full name: Scott Bonner McLaughlin
- Date of birth: 20 January 1984 (age 42)
- Place of birth: Glasgow, Scotland
- Position: Midfielder

Team information
- Current team: Doncaster City

Senior career*
Years	Team	Apps	(Gls)
–2002	Hamilton Academical	2	(0)
2002–2005	Livingston	31	(1)
2005	→ Greenock Morton (loan)	15	(0)
2005–2008	Greenock Morton	82	(3)
2008–2010	Airdrie United	67	(7)
2010–2011	Ayr United	33	(4)
2011–2012	Queen of the South	35	(5)
2012–2013	Peterhead	26	(3)
2013–2015	Ayr United	65	(9)
2015–2017	Clyde	75	(4)
2017–2018	Albion Rovers	35	(2)
2018–2019	Edusport Academy		
2019–2020	Stenhousemuir	28	(0)
2024–	Doncaster City	1	(0)
- * Club domestic league appearances and goals as of 18:28, 23 February 2024

Scott Bonner McLaughlin (born 20 January 1984 in Glasgow) is a Scottish former professional association footballer, who plays for Doncaster City.

McLaughlin has previously played for Hamilton Academical, Livingston, Greenock Morton, Airdrie United, Ayr United (two spells), Queen of the South, Peterhead, Clyde, Albion Rovers, Edusport Academy and Stenhousemuir.

== Career ==
McLaughlin started his career at Hamilton Academical. McLaughlin had one substitute appearance and one start, versus Cowdenbeath before leaving at the end of the 2001–02 season.

McLaughlin played a reasonable number of games at Livingston, where in the 2004 Scottish League Cup Final he appeared in the 80th minute as a substitute at right back versus Hibernian. Livingston won 2–0 with goals from Derek Lilley and Jamie McAllister. McLaughlin also scored what was voted the "goal of the month" that same season with a 30-yard volley versus Dundee United.

Livingston then loaned McLaughlin to Greenock Morton for six months of the 2004–05 season. After this spell, McLaughlin returned to Livingston and was getting a chance to play first team football under the club's new manager Paul Lambert. A few months into the 2005–06 season, McLaughlin then signed a permanent contract with the Greenock club.

One of the low points in his career was losing the play-off match versus Peterhead in the 2005–06 season and missing the vital penalty in a shoot-out defeat to local rivals St Mirren in the Challenge Cup semi-final. McLaughlin played in the majority of games as Greenock Morton won the Second Division in the 2006–07 season.

McLaughlin then joined Airdrie United in July 2008. In McLaughlin's first game versus Greenock Morton he scored the first two goals in a 5–0 win. McLaughlin also received the man-of-the-match award. In the 2008 Scottish Challenge Cup Final, McLaughlin was successful with his spot kick in the penalty shoot-out, as his club were victorious versus Ross County. In the 2008–09 season, Airdrie United finished 9th in the First Division, however they lost in the final of the play-offs.

McLaughlin played in the 2010–11 season's successful promotion campaign playing for Ayr United in his first spell with the Honest Men.

Manager Gus MacPherson announced on 8 July 2011 that McLaughlin had agreed terms and was expected to sign that day for Dumfries club, Queen of the South. McLaughlin's debut for the Doonhamers was on 23 July 2011, in an extra time 2–0 defeat away to his former club, the Honest Men at Somerset Park in the 2011–12 Scottish Challenge Cup.

On 15 June 2012, it was announced that McLaughlin had signed a two-year contract with Third Division club Peterhead.

McLaughlin signed for Ayr United in March 2013, less than a year into his two-year contract with Peterhead, for his second spell with the Honest Men. On 2 February 2015, McLaughlin signed an 18-month contract with Clyde. McLaughlin departed the club in May 2017 following at end of his contract at Broadwood. McLaughlin then signed for Albion Rovers for the start of the 2017–18 season.

McLaughlin left Stenhousemuir after a single season, in June 2020.

McLaughlin announced his retirement on 22 August 2020.

In February 2024, McLaughlin signed for Doncaster City.

== Personal life ==
McLaughlin was the victim of a hit-and-run after a driver sped through a red light and hit him at high speed in Glasgow in December 2021. He sustained three cracked ribs and a bruised lung.

== Honours ==
Livingston

- 2004 Scottish League Cup Final winner

Greenock Morton

- 2006–07 Scottish Second Division winner

Airdrie United

- 2008 Scottish Challenge Cup Final winner

Ayr United

- 2010–11 Scottish Second Division promotion
