= Kevin McDonald (footballer, born 1985) =

English footballer

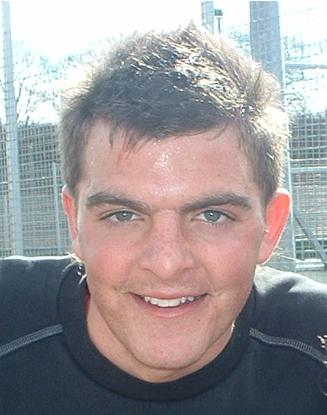

Personal information
- Full name: Kevin Alan McDonald
- Date of birth: 26 June 1985 (age 41)
- Place of birth: Newcastle upon Tyne, England
- Position: Midfielder

Youth career
- Wallsend Boys Club
- –2003: Sunderland
- 2003–2004: Hibernian

Senior career*
Years	Team	Apps	(Gls)
2004–2007	Hibernian	5	(0)
2006	→ Clyde (loan)	11	(0)
2006–2007	→ Airdrie United (loan)	24	(2)
2007–2010	Airdrie United	95	(9)
2010–2011	Alloa Athletic	27	(7)
2011–2013	Berwick Rangers	63	(5)
2013–2014	Bonnyrigg Rose Athletic		
2014–2018	Musselburgh Athletic		

Managerial career
- 2019–2021: Musselburgh Athletic
- 2025: Dunfermline Athletic (interim)
- * Club domestic league appearances and goals as of 18:00, 17 March 2025 (UTC)

Kevin Alan McDonald (born 26 June 1985 in Newcastle upon Tyne) is an English former professional footballer, is the interim head coach of Scottish Championship club Dunfermline Athletic.

== Club career ==
McDonald signed for Hibernian from Sunderland and made his senior debut on the final day of the 2003–04 season. He was loaned to Clyde for six months in 2006 and he then spent the 2006–07 season on loan at Airdrie United. McDonald was released by Hibs in 2007 and he then signed permanently for Airdrie. In June 2010 he moved onto Alloa Athletic.

McDonald signed for Junior side Bonnyrigg Rose Athletic in June 2013.

== Coaching ==
McDonald later signed for Musselburgh Athletic in 2014, where he would retire as a player and take up the assistant managers job at the club. He was appointed as permanent manager replacing Calvin Shand on 18 March 2019.

McDonald would join brother in law Kevin Thomson as his assistant at Kelty Hearts on 29 May 2021.

McDonald would then join Dunfermline Athletic as assistant manager to Michael Tidser on 17 January 2025.

== See also ==
- Clyde F.C. season 2005-06

== Honours ==
Airdrie United

- Scottish Challenge Cup: 2008–09
