= Scott Morrison (footballer) =

Scottish footballer (born 1984)

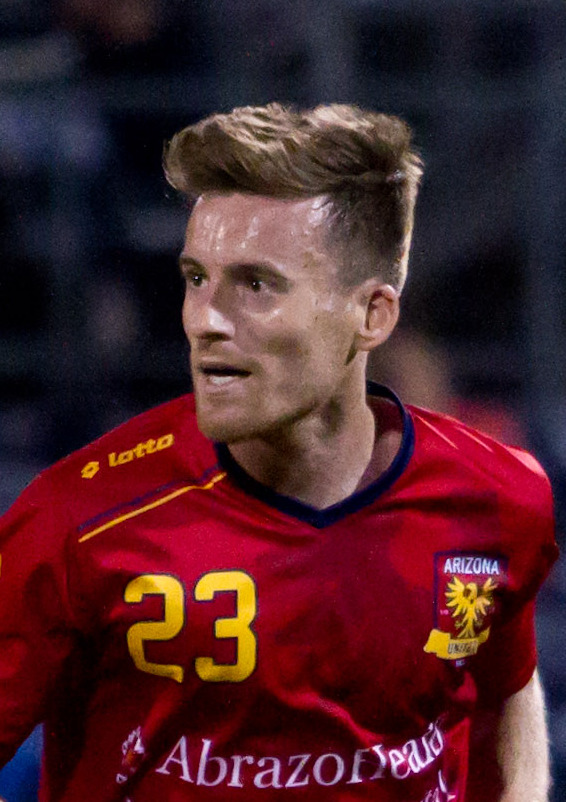
- Morrison with Arizona United in 2014

Personal information
- Full name: Scott Alexander Morrison
- Date of birth: 23 May 1984 (age 42)
- Place of birth: Aberdeen, Scotland
- Height: 1.76 m (5 ft 9 in)
- Position: Defender

Senior career*
Years	Team	Apps	(Gls)
2003–2005	Aberdeen	40	(1)
2005–2008	Dunfermline Athletic	32	(1)
2008–2012	Ross County	130	(6)
2013	Phoenix FC	25	(3)
2014–2016	Arizona United	54	(4)
Total		281	(15)

International career
2004–2005	Scotland U21	12	(0)

Managerial career
- 2021: San Diego 1904 FC
- * Club domestic league appearances and goals

Scott Alexander Morrison (born 23 May 1984) is a Scottish football coach and former professional player who played as a defender.

In his career, Morrison played for Aberdeen, Dunfermline Athletic, Ross County, Phoenix FC, and Arizona United, and also represented Scotland at under-21 international level. He formerly served as the head coach for San Diego 1904 FC in the National Independent Soccer Association.

== Club career ==
=== Aberdeen ===
Morrison was a pupil of Robert Gordon's College in Aberdeen, leaving in 2001. He began his career at boyhood heroes Aberdeen in 2003, where he immediately impressed on the field, especially with his lethal ball delivery from set pieces. Just eight days after pledging his future at Aberdeen.

Morrison made his debut, towards the end of the 2002/03 season, making his first start of his career, in a 2–1 win over Partick Thistle on 10 May 2003 and made another appearance of the last day of the season. The next season, Morrison soon made more appearances in the first team, though he would be often used in first team ins and out in his first season. On 28 February 2004, Morrison scored his first goal, which turns out to be a winning goal, as Aberdeen beat Hibernian. The next season, Morrison playing was soon limited under then Aberdeen manager Jimmy Calderwood, though he would be often used in first team ins and out in the season campaign.

=== Dunfermline Athletic ===
Despite this, he soon moved to Dunfermline Athletic in 2005 after falling out of favour with then Aberdeen manager Calderwood. He was signed by Jim Leishman in May 2005 on a free transfer, having previously tried to sign him last season.

He made his league debut in the club's opening match of the season, on 31 July 2005, in a 1–1 draw against Hibernian. Having made three appearances this season, Morrison soon suffered cruciate ligament damage, which ruled him out for months. After a successful operation in the US, it announced that Morrison would be out for the remainder of the season.

Ahead of the 2006–07 season, Morrison was given all clear to resume training from injury After four months absent, Morrison finally made his first appearance, in over a year, making his first start, in a 2–0 loss against Rangers. He was also played in the Scottish Cup final, making a start, in a 1–0 loss against Celtic. He since made twelve appearances this season, but the club was relegated to Scottish First Division. At the end of the season, Morrison signed a one-year contract extension and thank the club of supporting him of his career-threatening injury. He told the Pars website: "I thought I was on my way, so it's good to get it all sorted out. The club has shown a lot of faith in me. I was in and out of the team towards the end of last season, but getting into the Scottish Cup final line-up reassured me that I was in the manager's plans."

The following season, Morrison starts his season off making two appearances in the league before making two UEFA Cup appearances in the second round against Häcken. However, Dunfermline Athletic was eliminated from the UEFA Cup after losing 1–0 in the second leg, having previously drawn 1–1 in the first leg.

=== Ross County ===
Ross County snapped up Morrison on a two-year pre-contract deal at the start of April 2008. Upon the move, Morrison expressed happiness at joining the club.

He made his debut for the club, in a 2–0 loss against Livingston and he scored his first goal, the next game, in a 2–2 draw. A few weeks later, on 30 August 2008, Morrison provided an assist for Steven Craig from a free kick, in a 1–0 win over Partick Thistle. In the first half of the season the club progressed to the 2008 Scottish Challenge Cup Final. In the final, Ross County lost 3–2 on penalties against Airdrie United after a 2–2 draw. Morrison went on as a final substitute after 114 minutes and was one of the three Ross County players to miss their penalty. On 20 December 2008, Morrison scored his second goal, in a 2–1 loss against Greenock Morton At Ross County Morrison subsequently established himself in defense, though he still played a role in attack by taking free kicks.

The next season, Morrison scored his first goal in the first round of the Scottish League Cup, in a 5–0 win over Montrose and got his revenge against Airdrie United, after losing to them in the cup final, by providing an assist for Garry Wood, which turned out to be a winning goal in the opening game of the season.

During the season, Morrison soon became key in attack by providing assists, having made a double assist in two separate league matches. In December 2009, Morrison signed a new two-year contract, that will keep him until 2012. In the Scottish Cup, Morrison began by scoring two goals in two games with a victory. Ross County would eventually progress to the final, beating Celtic along the way. However, Ross County lost 3–0 in the final against Dundee United, where Morrison played in the left-back position. Just 15 days before the final, Morrison scored from a free kick in a 4–1 loss against Raith Rovers in the final game of the season.

The next season, Morrison scored his first goal of the season, in a 3–1 win over Stirling. A week later, he scored again in the semi-final against Partick Thistle; the match ended 2-2 and went to penalties, in which Ross County won 6–5, meaning the club advanced to the final against Queen of the South. In the final, Morrison came on as a late substitute, as Ross County won 2–0. In the final game of the season, Morrison scored his second goal of the season, in a 3–0 win over Cowdenbeath.

In his final season, Morrison scored his first goal of the season for the club in the first round of the Scottish Challenge Cup, as Ross County lost 2–1 against Elgin City.

At the end of the season, Morrison helped Ross County win the 2011–12 Scottish First Division, but left at the end of the season to further his career in America.

=== Phoenix FC and Arizona United ===
Morrison then signed a contract with Phoenix FC on 4 February 2013 after training with Chivas USA for the remainder of the 2012 MLS season, linking up with former Aberdeen teammate Darren Mackie and former Aberdeen player, now Head Coach of Phoenix FC, David Robertson for their inaugural season in the USL Professional Division.

He signed a contract with Phoenix FC's successor club, Arizona United on 8 April 2014. He announced his retirement and was hired as an assistant coach on 25 April 2016.

== Coaching career ==
In early 2021, Morrison joined with professional outfit San Diego 1904 FC ahead of the team's return from hiatus. Due to COVID-19 concerns, Morrison was unable to join the team for the initial spring tournament but later fully joined the team for the rest of the 2021 Spring season.

Until 2023, Morrison coached youth teams for San Diego Surf SC.

== Honours ==
Ross County

- Scottish Challenge Cup: 2010–11
