= Paul di Giacomo =

Scottish footballer

Paul Di Giacomo
Personal information
- Date of birth: 30 June 1982 (age 44)
- Place of birth: Glasgow, Scotland
- Positions: Striker; winger

Youth career
- 1998–2000: Kilmarnock

Senior career*
Years	Team	Apps	(Gls)
2000–2008	Kilmarnock	104	(13)
2005	→ Stirling Albion (loan)	16	(6)
2007–2008	→ Partick Thistle (loan)	6	(1)
2008–2009	Airdrie United	33	(5)
2009–2011	Ross County	45	(4)
2011–2012	Greenock Morton	24	(2)
2012–2013	Airdrie United	17	(4)
Total		245	(35)
- * Club domestic league appearances and goals

Paul Di Giacomo (born 30 June 1982) is a Scottish footballer. He began his career at Kilmarnock, before dropping into the Scottish Football League First Division with Airdrie United to move closer to his partner at the time who had just had a boy named Thomas, then Ross County. He also had loan spells from Kilmarnock with Stirling Albion and Partick Thistle.

== Career ==
As a striker who can also play on the wing, Di Giacomo made his Kilmarnock debut in a 1–0 defeat of St Mirren in July 2000. He was loaned to Stirling Albion for part of the 2004–05 season. He again went out on loan in August 2007, this time to Partick Thistle. At Partick he scored twice; once against Berwick Rangers in a Challenge Cup tie and once against future club Greenock Morton in the league. He was released by the Rugby Park side in June 2008 and a week later was snapped up by Scottish First Division side Airdrie United. He moved to Ross County on 1 June 2009.

Di Giacomo scored on his debut for Ross County against his old club Airdrie United in the opening game of the 09/10 season. He continued his good start to the season with a goal against Inverness Caledonian Thistle.

He joined Greenock Morton in June 2011, and scored four goals on his debut against Stranraer in the Challenge Cup. On 1 May 2012, Di Giacomo confirmed that he would leave the club at the end of the season to go part-time. In July 2012, he signed for former club Airdrie United. His contract with Airdrie United was terminated by mutual consent in April 2013.

He retired from football in 2013 and is now the head of academy at Kilmarnock.

== Honours ==
- Scottish League Challenge Cup
  - 2008–09 (with Airdrie United)
  - 2010–11 (with Ross County)
- Top Scorer: 2011–12 Scottish Challenge Cup (with Greenock Morton)
