= Marc Smyth =

Scottish-born Northern Irish footballer

Personal information
- Full name: Marc Smyth
- Date of birth: 27 December 1982 (age 43)
- Place of birth: Edinburgh, Scotland
- Position: Centre back

Youth career
- Blackpool

Senior career*
Years	Team	Apps	(Gls)
–2001	Glenafton Athletic		
2001–2005	Ayr United	104	(4)
2005–2006	Partick Thistle	26	(1)
2006–2010	Airdrie United	114	(3)
2010–2012	Greenock Morton	61	(1)
2012–2016	Cliftonville	83	(6)

International career^{‡}
- Northern Ireland U16
- Northern Ireland U18
- * Club domestic league appearances and goals as of 15:19, 26 April 2013 (UTC) ‡ National team caps and goals as of 13 February 2011

Marc Smyth (born 27 December 1982) is a Scottish-born Northern Irish former professional footballer who played as a defender. He is currently Head of Academy at Cliftonville after retiring.

== Career ==
In his Scottish Football League career, Smyth (pronounced Smith) has also played for Ayr United, Partick Thistle and Airdrie United. Smyth started his career in Junior football with Ayrshire side Glenafton Athletic following a youth career with English side Blackpool where he won youth caps for Northern Ireland.

Before moving into the professional game at the age of 19, Edinburgh-born Smyth played junior football with Ayrshire side Glenafton Athletic.

He then signed for played for Ayr United, before moving onto Partick Thistle and Airdrie United before signing with Greenock Morton in 2010.

In season 2008-09, he scored the winning penalty for Airdrie United in the 2008 Scottish Challenge Cup Final against Ross County, after a 2–2 draw.

Smyth signed for Greenock Morton at the start of the 2010–11 season, but was released in May 2012.

Smyth signed for Cliftonville F.C. in June 2012.

== International career ==
As a youth player at Blackpool, Smyth played for Northern Ireland's U16 and U18 sides.

== See also ==
- Greenock Morton F.C. season 2010–11 | 2011–12

== Honours ==
Airdrie United

- Scottish Challenge Cup: 2008–09
