= Matthew Hazley =

Northern Irish footballer

Personal information
- Date of birth: 30 December 1987 (age 38)
- Place of birth: Banbridge, Northern Ireland
- Height: 1.70 m (5 ft 7 in)
- Position: Midfielder

Team information
- Current team: Banbridge Town

Youth career
- 2003–2004: Glenavon

Senior career*
Years	Team	Apps	(Gls)
2004–2008	Stoke City	1	(0)
2007	→ Stafford Rangers (loan)	6	(0)
2008	Stafford Rangers	15	(0)
2008–2009	Airdrie United	19	(0)
2010–2011	Newry City	63	(4)
2011–2012	Crusaders	10	(1)
2012–2017	Dungannon Swifts	119	(15)
2017	Portadown	13	(2)
2018–2020	Banbridge Rangers		
2020–2023	FC Mindwell		
2023-	Banbridge Town		

International career^{‡}
2006	Northern Ireland U21	1	(0)

Managerial career
- 2023-: Banbridge Town (Assistant Coach)
- * Club domestic league appearances and goals as of 22:00, 1 January 2019 (UTC) ‡ National team caps and goals as of 22:29, 8 August 2008 (UTC)

Matthew Hazley (born 30 December 1987) is a Northern Irish footballer who is a player/coach for NIFL Premier Intermediate League side Banbridge Town.

== Career ==
Hazley moved to Stoke City in 2004 from Glenavon. He joined Stafford Rangers in August 2007, for an initial one-month loan spell, and made his debut in the 3–1 defeat against Kidderminster Harriers.

Hazley made his debut for Northern Ireland Under-21 team on 14 November 2006 in a 2–1 defeat against Germany. Hazley made his one and only Stoke appearance in a match against Coventry City on 24 May 2006, he came on as a substitute in the 56th minute. Hazley was offered a four-month extension to his contract in May 2007, to prove his fitness following injury.

On 15 August 2007 Hazley was sent on a one-month loan to Stafford Rangers, where he made six appearances. He returned to Stoke on 12 September 2007 after he was sent off during Stafford's 3–0 defeat to Stevenage the previous day. In early January 2008, following his release from Stoke City, Hazley signed for Stafford Rangers, but signed for Scottish First Division side Airdrie United in July 2008 after a successful trial with the club.

Hazley returned to Northern Ireland to play for Newry City in 2010 and then signed for Crusaders in 2011, before making the move to Dungannon Swifts in May 2012.

Hazley then made the switch from Dungannon to Portadown in 2017 before announcing he would be leaving the club in late 2017. Hazley then joined Mid-Ulster side Banbridge Rangers in 2018.

== Career statistics ==
- Sourced from Matthew Hazley at the English National Football Archive (subscription required)

Club	Season	League			FA Cup		League Cup		Total	
Club	Season	Division	Apps	Goals	Apps	Goals	Apps	Goals	Apps	Goals
Stoke City	2005–06	Championship	1	0	0	0	0	0	1	0
Career Total			1	0	0	0	0	0	1	0
