= Simon Lynch =

Footballer (born 1982)

Personal information
- Full name: Simon George Lynch
- Date of birth: 19 May 1982 (age 44)
- Place of birth: Montreal, Quebec, Canada
- Position: Striker

Senior career*
Years	Team	Apps	(Gls)
1999–2001	Celtic	4	(3)
2002–2005	Preston North End	44	(1)
2003	→ Stockport County (loan)	9	(3)
2004	→ Blackpool (loan)	7	(0)
2005–2006	Dundee	33	(12)
2006–2008	Queensland Roar	36	(5)
2008–2009	Airdrie United	33	(10)
2009	Dumbarton	1	(0)
2009–2010	East Stirlingshire	33	(13)
2010–2011	Stenhousemuir	17	(4)
Total		218	(52)

International career
2002–2003	Scotland U21	13	(5)
- * Club domestic league appearances and goals

Simon George Lynch (born 19 May 1982) is a former professional footballer, who played for clubs in Scotland, England, and Australia. Born in Canada, he played for the Scotland U21 national team at the international level.

== Club career ==
=== Early career ===
Lynch, who was born in Montreal but moved to Scotland as a child, started his career at Celtic and managed three goals in five appearances (his father, Andy Lynch, captained Celtic in the 1970s). A highlight was scoring a brace in a 4–1 win at Hearts in April 2002. He turned down an improved contract offer from Celtic to join Preston North End in January 2003 for £130,000. Lynch scored just two goals in forty-five appearances, his goals coming against Wimbledon in the league and Mansfield Town in the Football League Cup. Lynch had loan spells with Stockport County and Blackpool before returning to Scotland with Dundee in 2005. He managed 13 goals in 31 league appearances for the Dark Blues, but Dundee's financial problems meant he was unlikely to remain.

=== Queensland Roar ===
On 3 July 2006, it was revealed that Lynch had signed a two-year contract with Queensland Roar. Despite being unable to participate in the pre-season cup due to visa problems, Lynch wasted no time in making an impact for his new team and quickly made a name for himself in round 1 in his debut game scoring the first goal in Queensland's 3-nil win over Perth Glory. He continued his hot-form and was quickly become a crowd favourite of the Queensland Roar faithful when he scored the winner against the Newcastle Jets with just seconds remaining.

He then took his tally to three from four against New Zealand Knights. He formed a deadly partnership with Reinaldo and Ante Milicic in the opening nine rounds until he suffered a hamstring injury which kept him on the sidelines for a long period of the season and this huge blow saw the Roar lack in attack, spark and goals which slowly brought them down and out of the top four. His solid start to the season saw him come tied for 8th in the Johnny Warren Medal for Player of the Year.

While the 2007–08 Season was approaching, Lynch had shown impressive form scoring three times in four matches including a superb goal in Queensland Roar's 4–1 win over SuperSport United in a friendly at Suncorp Stadium. After having surgery during the off-season, Lynch had shown mountains of confidence and was looking forward to continue his solid form come the start of the third A-league season. At the end of the 07–08 season, after not getting much game time due to injuries, Lynch was released by Queensland.

=== Return to Scotland and end of his career ===
Lynch signed for Airdrie United in July 2008. He joined East Stirlingshire a season later before moving on to Stenhousemuir at the start of the 2010–11 season. He decided to retire at the end of the season as he lost his enthusiasm for the game.

== International career ==
Lynch played 13 times for Scotland under-21s, scoring five goals.

== Honours ==
Airdrie United

- Scottish Challenge Cup: 2008–09
