= 2011–12 Dunfermline Athletic F.C. season =

Dunfermline Athletic
2011–12 season
- Chairman: John Yorkston
- Manager: Jim McIntyre (until 16 March); Jim Jefferies (from 20 March)
- Stadium: East End Park
- SPL: 12th (relegated)
- Scottish Cup: Fourth round, lost to Inverness Caledonian Thistle
- League Cup: Second round, lost to East Fife
- Fife Cup: Semi-final, lost to Raith Rovers
- Top goalscorer: League: Andy Kirk (11); All: Andy Kirk (12)
- Highest home attendance: 10,140 v Celtic, 2 January 2012
- Lowest home attendance: 2,303 v Kilmarnock, 7 February 2012
- Average home league attendance: 4,799
Home colours	Away colours

The 2011–12 season was Dunfermline Athletic's 1st season back in the Scottish Premier League after winning promotion from the Scottish First Division during the 2010–11 season. They also competed in the Scottish Cup and the Scottish League Cup.

== SPL ==
The new SPL season started on 23 July, but Dunfermline didn't play until two days later as they were scheduled for TV coverage on Sky Sports.

=== July/August ===
St Mirren (Home)

In the first game of the season Dunfermline hosted St Mirren in a match which the visitors dominated. Just before half-time a penalty was awarded to St Mirren, which was taken by Stephen Thompson, but saved by goalkeeper Paul Gallacher. The rest of the match was played out with St Mirren on top but unable to beat Gallacher. Final score: 0–0.

Inverness (Home)

In a six-goal thriller the points were evenly split, leaving both sides feeling that they could have won the match. Dunfermline dominated most of the match and started well with Andy Kirk scoring early with a neat finish. After half-time Inverness scored from a deflected Greg Tansey shot, then Dunfermline pulled ahead with another goal from Kirk. The visitors rallied as Dunfemline sat back further and further allowing Inverness to score twice more from Jonny Hayes, after a spilled save by Gallacher, and a Tansey header. Deep into stoppage time Martin Hardie curled a 30-yard free kick into the top corner to equalise. Final score: 3–3 .

St Johnstone (Away)

In Dunfermline's first away trip of the SPL season they came out the victors. An early goal for the hosts was ruled out for a handball, and a resulting yellow card for the defender. From a clever corner routine Jason Thomson curled the ball through to Kirk, who fired in from short range. At this point Kirk was now the leading goalscorer in the SPL. Martin Hardie then went close to scoring against his former club with a header from a corner. With half an hour to go in the game John Potter tripped Francisco Sandaza and was sent off,(though this was later rescinded to a yellow) with a penalty awarded to the hosts. The resulting penalty was taken by Liam Craig and was saved by Paul Gallacher, his second penalty save in three games. Despite the extra man advantage St Johnstone rarely looked like scoring and the few chances they did have was dealt with by the keeper comfortably. Final Score: 1–0

Dundee United (Away)

Dundee United dominated this game from start to finish but were unable to score against an in-form Paul Gallacher. A triple save was particularly impressive, firstly from a near post header. Then again from the corner and the resulting drive from outside the box forced Gallacher into a super reaction save as he only saw it late. Dunfermline's only threat going forward was from set-pieces where Hardie went close from a free-kick and a corner. But late on a mazy run from Joe Cardle was crossed low back to the edge of the area, where Paul Burns's well taken shot was driven into the net. Final Score:1–0

Motherwell (Home)

Both teams went into this match after an excellent start to the season, both surpassing expectations. From the start the visitors looked like they would get goals with Dunfermline's defence being torn apart, especially by a lively Chris Humphrey. The breakthrough finally came when Keith Lasley and Michael Higdon combined with Higdon curling in from the edge of the area. Tom Hateley nearly made it two a few minutes later with a free-kick hitting the post. But it was only a short respite for Dunfermline as Motherwell scored again, Jamie Murphy strolled past Gary Mason and was given time to hit a 20-yard shot which heavily deflected off Alex Keddie and into the net. In the second half things hadn't changed with Motherwell dominating and when Chris Humphrey was allowed to cut inside into the box his shot clipped the post and into the net. Dunfermline then started to attack, pushing Motherwell back, and were rewarded when David Graham's 25-yard shot flicked off Joe Cardle and into the net, with Cardle claiming the goal. Cardle then bagged another as he cut into the box and his shot deflected off Stephen Craigan and past the helpless keeper. With two minutes to go Dunfermline pushed forward, but were counter-attacked and Higdon's late finish from a cross by Nicky Law finished the game. Final Score:2–4

=== September ===
Kilmarnock (away)

Dunfermline's first game after the international break started well with Jason Thomson scoring his first professional goal after the ball ricocheted off him from a corner. At this point, Dunfermline were on top even though manager Jim McIntyre had been sent to the stands by the referee early on. Alex Keddie then brought down James Dayton in the box, and the resulting penalty was converted by Paul Heffernan. He then doubled his goal tally when an incisive ball through the defence from Dean Shiels was finished by the striker. Straight after half-time Dunfermline hit back with Ryan Thomson heading home Joe Cardle's cross. However Zdenek Kroca calmly slotted a finish in after being given time in the box, putting the home side back in the lead. Late on Andy Kirk thought he had equalised but was correctly ruled offside. Final score: 2–3

Hibernian (home)

The home side could have been three up within the first half an hour with Kirk, Jason Thomson and Alex Keddie all putting chances wide. Dunfermline were controlling the game until, against the run off play, Hibs scored. A throw-in on the right, just inside Dunfermline's half, was flicked on to Ivan Sproule, who walked through some poor defending to easily slot home. Hibs then took charge of the game and Paul Gallacher had to make a super one-on-one save from Garry O'Connor. However, in the second half O'Connor's shot, after being allowed to turn by Austin McCann, deflected off Keddie and past the hapless Gallacher. Dunfermline then attacked and were rewarded under two minutes later after Ryan Thomson powered through the Hibs team and finished well. A Joe Cardle drive was then parried out to J. Thomson who scuffed his shot off Paul Hanlon and into the net. Dunfermline nearly won the game with attempts from Cardle, Andrew Barrowman and the impressive David Graham, all not finding the goal. Final Score:2–2

Rangers (Home)

This was a game which showed the gulf of class between the Old Firm and the rest of the league. Rangers took the lead in less than 10 minutes with a Carlos Bocanegra header from a corner. A few minutes later Maurice Edu fired home an excellent shot from 20 yards to make it 2–0. A penalty appeal for Rangers was then turned down, despite J Thomson appearing to be holding onto Bocanegra. Steven Naismith was then lucky not to be sent off as he elbowed Austin McCann in the face during a free-kick. The referee missed it, but he was caught by the cameras and subsequently banned. Allan McGregor then had his first save to make after Paul Burns's bouncing shot had to be turned away. Early in the second half a through ball by Steven Davis was slotted home by Naismith to make it 3–0. McGregor then was forced into a fine save after David Graham got one-on-one with him after a fine through ball by Andrew Barrowman. Naismith then finished off the scoring after a fast break by Rangers left them five on three against Dufermline and an unselfish Nikica Jelavic squared it for Naismith's second off the day. It would have been more if Paul Gallacher hadn't made some excellent saves including two free-kicks from Davis and Jelavic as well as 35-yard volley from Steven Whittaker. Dunfermline gave the ball away far too many times during the game with Gary Mason and J Thomson the worst offenders. Final Score 0–4

Aberdeen (Away)

The first of the experimental Friday night football games this season with met with a routing of Dunfermline by Aberdeen. An early goal from a Scott Vernon header from Ricky Foster's cross put the Dons in a commanding position. Aberdeen's left-back Foster was the key man providing the best attacking threat with his dangerous crosses and only a string of super saves by Paul Gallacher kept the score at 1–0. But half an hour later Vernon's second headed goal of the night, after Youl Mawene's flick on, put Aberdeen in a comfortable lead. Replays later confirmed that Vernon was offside when the ball was played, but the goal would stand. A third goal came on the stroke of half-time with a Foster cross being controlled by Vernon and he had time to flick the ball onto Fraser Fyvie who slotted home. So far, Dunfermline's only chance had been an Andrew Barrowman header which went just past the post. Barrowman then had a second half shot turned round the post as he provided Dunfermline's attacking threat. A final goal came by Vernon after Mohamed Chalali's shot hit the post and rebounded nicely. Manager McIntyre criticised a dire performance all round by Dunfermline with Jason Thomson and John Potter later criticised heavily. Only Gallacher escaped the managers wrath. Final Score 0–4

=== October ===
Hearts (Home)

A dull game was won by the visitors after two mistakes cost Dunfermline two goals. Hearts had the best of the first half with David Templeton having an early shot deflected wide by John Potter. Later, Rudi Skacel had his shot turned round the post for a corner by Paul Gallacher. From the resulting corner front post man Kirk failed in his attempted clearance, merely flicking the ball backwards onto Andy Webster's head and from inside the 6-yard box, he could not miss. Neither side had many clear-cut chances with Dunfermline's chances coming from a sliced Paddy Boyle cross over the bar, and a mazy run from David Graham finishing with a shot straight into the keeper's arms. Hearts went close from a long shot by Danny Grainger and a header by the same. Boyle then gave the ball away with a terrible pass straight to Templeton whose shot was saved by Gallacher, but the rebound put away by Skacel. Final score 0–2

Inverness (Away)

An early Paul Burns strike curled against the inside of the post and trickled along the line, somehow staying out of the goal. Dunfermline proceeded to dominate as John Potter and Joe Cardle had shot saved by the keeper Ryan Esson. A slip by Alex Keddie then let Richie Foran past him and his cross was met by a flying header from ex-Raith Rovers player Gregory Tade. However, in the second half, the Pars continued to threaten and Andy Kirk hooked a shot over before Inverness immediately responded with a 25-yard Greg Tansey free-kick that flew a foot wide. Liam Buchanan was then brought down in the box by David Proctor, and he stepped up to take the penalty himself, calmly slotting home to equalise. Right at the end, Shane Sutherland had an effort well saved by the keeper to keep the score level. Final score 1–1

Dundee United (Home)

The first piece of action in the game came in the form of a Gavin Gunning free-kick, which was turned round the post by Paul Gallacher. In the 13th minute of the game, a Willo Flood free-kick was only partially cleared by Jason Thomson and fell to Paul Dixon who volleyed home an unstoppable shot from just inside the area. Five minutes later he took another shot that deflected off John Potter and fell kindly for Lauri Dalla Valle, who was left with a simple finish to make it 2–0. Dunfermline's task was made much harder when Gary Mason was sent off for a seemingly innocuous tackle on Johnny Russell. Replays later showed that Mason had won the ball cleanly in a one footed challenge, though Russell's reaction after the tackle appeared to have swayed the referee. Jim McIntyre immediately stated he would appeal the decision. After the red card Dunfermline rallied and managed to put the visitors under pressure and after the ball bounced nicely off Paddy Boyle, Andy Kirk was on hand to score. Dunfermline pushed for a second, but left spaces in the defence and when Russell scored a third for United, it seemed game over. Dunfermline continued their pressure and when Pat Clarke went to play the ball past Jon Daly, only for the defender to handle the ball, a red card was expected as Clarke would have been clean through on goal. However, only a yellow was produced. From the resulting free-kick United broke away and Russell laid the ball into Gary Mackay-Steven's path for him to fire home. Final Score 1–4

=== November ===
Hibs (Away)

In a game where the home side dominated possession, first blood went to the visitors with an early goal. Paul Willis's run down the right side ended in a cross to the back post where Austin McCann volleyed in from close range. It was his first goal in over 100 appearances for Dunfermline. Hibs fought back, but were unable to make a clear-cut chance. Kirk and Dowie then both went close in quick succession though Dunfermline never looked like adding to their tally. Hibs piled on the pressure with good saves by Gallacher from Leigh Griffiths's efforts. However, the visitors held on for the third 1–0 away victory of the season. Final score 1–0

St Mirren (Away)

From the very start the home side dominated with several chances in the first half. Jim Goodwin's low shot from 30 yards was parried away by Paul Gallacher, then a few minutes later a driven shot came back off Paul Burns in the penalty box which brought appeals for a penalty, but were waved away by the ref. Shortly after, a free-kick was trapped under Burns as he tried to clear and another shout for a penalty came, but once again were ignored. Gallacher was forced into more saves, but the pressure told as Nigel Hasselbaink burst through the defence as Gallacher narrowed the angle, he squared across the goal mouth to Kenny McLean, who tapped in from a yard out. Stephen Thompson then had too efforts magnificently saved by Gallacher as St Mirren pushed for a second. Dunfermline then had their first proper chance with a superb Paul Willis cross met by Ryan Thomson who headed just wide. Austin McCann took too much time on the ball and was punished when he lost possession to Stephen Thompson and his pass to Hasselbaink was smashed into the net. After half time to game calmed down, with less chances for either side. Joe Cardle came off the bench and made an immediate impact. His cross evaded everyone and came back off the post only to strike Saints keeper Craig Samson and roll into the net. Cardle then nearly equalised with a drive which was well saved by Samson. However, the home side comfortably held onto their position till the end of the game. Final Score 1–2

Celtic (Away)

An already hard task away at one of the Old Firm was made harder in just over 5 minutes, when Paul Willis played a backwards pass straight to Gary Hooper who took two touches into the box and fired home across the box into the bottom left hand corner. Alex Keddie then gave the ball away on the half-way line and Jamie Forrest, Hooper and Kris Commons combined to switch the ball across to the left hand side to Anthony Stokes. He drove low at goal and Paul Gallacher's parry reached Hooper who flicked it backwards to Forrest, who smashed in into the roof of the net. A long range drive from Biram Kayal was then saved by Gallacher's stretched leg. Dunfermline then had a penalty appeal turned away after Daniel Majstorović climbed over the back off Ryan Thomson. Celtic continued to look for a second and Gallacher and Keddie combined to keep out Commons after a low cross from the left by Stokes. Stokes then somehow missed from two yards out, mistiming his back post volley. In the second half Paul Burns felled Forrest in the box, to give away a penalty. Ki then sent Gallacher the wrong way, but hit the outside of the post, from the spot. Stokes then missed a one-on-one chance, hitting the post again. Joe Cardle went close for the Pars, cutting inside from the left forcing Fraser Forster into a good low save. He then made another as Liam Buchanan was sent through, but the keep was out fast to block the attempted chip. David Graham then laid off Andrew Barrowman in the right hand corner of the box, and his low drive across goal found the net. Final score 1–2

Aberdeen (Home)

The visitors started strongly, on a day with hollowing gales swirling through the stadium, with some early chances. Rory Fallon just failed to make contact with a low cross and Josh Magennis somehow failed to score in a goalmouth scramble. He then vented his anger by shoving the home keeper in the chest and full in the face. However, the referee inexplicably decided that the violent conduct from him merited only a yellow card. The home fans were even more infuriated when Paul Willis tried to take a quick free-kick, and apparently was deemed to have committed an equal offence as Magennis, so was yellow carded for his effort. Andy Kirk should have hit the target with a turning snap-shot, and David Graham was also guilty of missing the target with a close range diving header after an excellent move by Dufermline. Aberdeen were looking dangerous from set-pieces and deservedly took the lead right on half-time with a header by Andrew Considine from a Fraser Fyvie corner. Paddy Boyle was then lucky to escape with a yellow after his two-footed challenge on Fyvie. Dunfermline then equalised from a Graham corner, Andrew Barrowman's header was blocked on the line, but he was first on hand to put away the rebound. Then, from Willis's superb diagonal ball, Graham cut inside from the left and rifled inside the near post of David Gonzalez to take the lead. Aberdeen nearly stuck back straight away with Youl Mawene keeping the ball away from Paul Gallacher and cutting it back, only for Magennis to miss the target with no keeper in the goal. Boyle did well to turn past the defenders and force in shot which was parried to Liam Buchanan, whose first touch coming on as a sub was to make it 3–1. Immediately from the restart Gallacher saved one-on-one with Magennis, showing Aberdeen could score again. From a quick Martin Hardie free-kick, Buchanan cut the ball back and Barrowman looked odds on the score, only for Gonzalez to somehow tip his point blank range onto the post. Straight away Aberdeen won a corner and from it Alex Keddie headed in an own goal. From then on it was all Aberdeen, and the visitors final scored a fourth. From a long throw-in Magennis managed to turn a smash home the equaliser. Final score 3–3.

== Results ==
Win Draw Loss

=== Pre-season ===
2 July 2011 Friendly	Livingston	1–1	Dunfermline Athletic	Livingston
	Russell 9'	DAFC Report	Hardie 5'	Stadium: Braidwood Motor Company Stadium; Attendance: 657; Referee: Tumilty

5 July 2011 Friendly	Brechin City	1–1	Dunfermline Athletic	Brechin
	King 83' (pen.)	DAFC Report	Kirk 28'	Stadium: Glebe Park; Attendance: 342; Referee: McDermott

12 July 2011 Friendly	(Czech Republic) Mladá Boleslav	0–0	Dunfermline Athletic	Bischofshofen
		DAFC Report		Stadium: Sportplatz Bischofshofen

14 July 2011 Friendly	(Romania) Rapid București	4–1	Dunfermline Athletic	Bischofshofen
	Herea 34' (pen.); Grigorie 37'; Burcă 59'; Apostol 88'	DAFC Report	Willis 79'	Stadium: Sportplatz Bischofshofen

19 July 2011 Friendly	Dunfermline Athletic	1–2	(England) Huddersfield Town	Dunfermline
	McDougall 20'	DAFC Report	Rhodes 39', 42'	Stadium: East End Park; Attendance: 1,164; Referee: Salmond

=== Scottish Premier League ===
25 July 2011 SPL	Dunfermline Athletic	0–0	St Mirren	Dunfermline
19:45		BBC Sport		Stadium: East End Park; Attendance: 5,035; Referee: O'Reilly

6 August 2011 SPL	Dunfermline Athletic	3–3	Inverness Caledonian Thistle	Dunfermline
15:00	Andy Kirk 26', 52'; Hardie 90'	BBC Sport	Tansey 46', 83'; Hayes 76'	Stadium: East End Park; Attendance: 3,378; Referee: Finnie

13 August 2011 SPL	St Johnstone	0–1	Dunfermline Athletic	Perth
15:00		BBC Sport	Kirk 30'; Potter (red card) 61'	Stadium: McDiarmid Park; Attendance: 3,466; Referee: Salmond

20 August 2011 SPL	Dundee United	0–1	Dunfermline Athletic	Dundee
15:00		BBC Sport	Burns 85'	Stadium: Tannadice; Attendance: 6,527; Referee: O'Reilly

27 August 2011 SPL	Dunfermline Athletic	2–4	Motherwell	Dunfermline
15:00	Cardle 69', 88'	BBC Sport	Higdon 11', 90'; Murphy 26'; Humphrey 55'	Stadium: East End Park; Attendance: 4,462; Referee: Norris

10 September 2011 SPL	Kilmarnock	3–2	Dunfermline Athletic	Dundee
15:00	Heffernan 32' (pen.), 45'; Kroca 62'	BBC Sport	Thomson 14'; Thomson 49'	Stadium: Tannadice; Attendance: 4,222; Referee: Winter

17 September 2011 SPL	Dunfermline Athletic	2–2	Hibernian	Dunfermline
12:30	Thomson 53'; Hanlon 63' (o.g.)	BBC Sport	Sproule 37'; O'Connor 51'	Stadium: East End Park; Attendance: 4,116; Referee: Murray

24 September 2011 SPL	Dunfermline Athletic	0–4	Rangers	Dunfermline
		BBC Sport	Bocanegra 9'; Edu 17'; Naismith 51', 81'	Stadium: East End Park; Attendance: 7,577; Referee: Brines

30 September 2011 SPL	Aberdeen	4–0	Dunfermline Athletic	Aberdeen
	Vernon 6', 35', 80'; Fyvie 45'	BBC Sport		Stadium: Pittodrie Stadium; Attendance: 8,333; Referee: Madden

15 October 2011 SPL	Dunfermline Athletic	0–2	Heart of Midlothian	East End Park
		BBC Report	Webster 43'; Skacel 76'	Attendance: 5,694; Referee: O'Reilly

22 October 2011 SPL	Inverness Caledonian Thistle	1–1	Dunfermline Athletic	Caledonian Stadium
	Tadé 33'	BBC Sport	Buchanan 86' (pen.)	Attendance: 3,241; Referee: McLean

29 October 2011 SPL	Dunfermline Athletic	1–4	Dundee United	East End Park
	Mason (red card) 26'; Kirk 55'	BBC Sport	Dixon 13'; Dalla Valle 18'; Russell 75'; Mackay-Steven 82'	Attendance: 3,979; Referee: O'Reilly

5 November 2011 SPL	Hibernian	0–1	Dunfermline Athletic	Easter Road
		BBC Sport	McCann 3'	Attendance: 9,531; Referee: Thomson

19 November 2011 SPL	St Mirren	2–1	Dunfermline Athletic	St Mirren Park
15;00	Mclean 25'; Hasselbaink 45'	BBC Sport	Cardle 63'	Attendance: 4,363; Referee: Allan

23 November 2011 SPL	Celtic	2–1	Dunfermline Athletic	Celtic Park
19:45	Hooper 6'; Forrest 13'	BBC Sport	Barrowman 86'	Attendance: 41,000; Referee: Madden

26 November 2011 SPL	Dunfermline Athletic	3–3	Aberdeen	East End Park
15:00	Barrowman 54'; Graham 62'; Buchanan 69'	BBC Sport	Considine 45+2'; Keddie 81' (o.g.); Magennis 88'	Attendance: 4,149; Referee: Salmond

3 December 2011 SPL	Rangers	2–1	Dunfermline Athletic	Ibrox Stadium
15:00	Keddie 22' (o.g.); Jelavić 29' (pen.)	BBC Sport	Cardle 31'	Attendance: 47,305; Referee: Conroy

17 December 2011 SPL	Heart of Midlothian	4–0	Dunfermline Athletic	Tynecastle Stadium
15:00	Elliott 2'; Taouil 27'; Templeton 71'; Skácel 90+2'	BBC Sport		Attendance: 11,988; Referee: Richmond

24 December 2011 SPL	Dunfermline Athletic	0–3	St Johnstone	East End Park
13:30		BBC Sport	Smith 38' (o.g.); Sandaza 52'; Craig 59'	Attendance: 4,474; Referee: Thomson

2 January 2012 SPL	Dunfermline Athletic	0–3	Celtic	East End Park
15:00		BBC Sport	Stokes 18'; Wanyama 40'; Mulgrew 69'	Attendance: 10,140; Referee: Brines

14 January 2012 SPL	Dunfermline Athletic	2–3	Hibernian	East End Park
15:00	Kirk 14'; Buchanan 82'	BBC Sport	Griffiths 33', 83'; O'Connor 75'	Attendance: 6,780; Referee: Muir

21 January 2012 SPL	Kilmarnock	0–3	Dunfermline Athletic	Rugby Park
15:00		BBC Sport	Barrowman 42'; Cardle 60'; Buchanan 87'	Attendance: 4,016; Referee: Collum

24 January 2012 SPL	Motherwell	3–1	Dunfermline Athletic	Fir Park
19:45	Craigan (red card) 18'; Ojamaa 29'; Law 52'; Humphrey 80'	BBC Sport	Kirk 62'	Attendance: 3,772; Referee: Muir

28 January 2012 SPL	Aberdeen	1–0	Dunfermline Athletic	Pittodrie Stadium
15:00	Vernon 24'	BBC Report		Attendance: 8,081; Referee: Thomson

7 February 2012 SPL	Dunfermline Athletic	1–1	Kilmarnock	East End Park
19:45	Kirk 44'	BBC Sport	Fowler 21'	Attendance: 2,303; Referee: Murray

11 February 2012 SPL	Dunfermline Athletic	1–4	Rangers	East End Park
12:00	Kirk 16'	BBC Sport	Healy 24'; McCulloch 39'; Aluko 71'; Kerkar 85'	Attendance: 7,464; Referee: Winter

18 February 2012 SPL	Dunfermline Athletic	1–1	Inverness Caledonian Thistle	East End Park
15:00	Cardle 45'	BBC Sport	Ross 73'	Attendance: 2,881; Referee: Madden

22 February 2012 SPL	Celtic	2–0	Dunfermline Athletic	Celtic Park
19:45	Mulgrew 32'; Forrest 75'	BBC Sport		Attendance: 45,000; Referee: O'Reilly

25 February 2012 SPL	St Johnstone	3–1	Dunfermline Athletic	McDiarmid Park
15:00	M Davidson 33'; C Davidson 35'; Croft 78'	BBC Report	Burns 73'	Attendance: 3,732; Referee: Colvin

3 March 2012 SPL	Dunfermline Athletic	0–2	Motherwell	East End Park
15:00		BBC Sport	Higdon 64'; Ojamaa 70'	Attendance: 3,523; Referee: Winter

24 March 2012 SPL	Dunfermline Athletic	1–1	St Mirren	East End Park
15:00	Cardle 46'	BBC Sport	Thompson 38'	Attendance: 3,753; Referee: Muir

31 March 2012 SPL	Dundee United	3–0	Dunfermline Athletic	Tannadice Park
15:00	Daly 49', 83'; Robertson 80'	BBC Sport		Attendance: 6,654; Referee: Beaton

7 April 2012 SPL	Dunfermline Athletic	1–2	Heart of Midlothian	East End Park
15:00	Žaliūkas 85' (o.g.)	BBC Sport	Glen 49'; Barr 53'	Attendance: 4,700; Referee: Finnie

21 April 2012 SPL	St Mirren	4–4	Dunfermline Athletic	St Mirren Park
15:00	Hasselbaink 4'; Thompson 43', 48', 67'	BBC Sport	McMillan 24'; Graham 56'; Buchanan 71'; Kirk 88'	Attendance: 3,616; Referee: Brines

28 April 2012 SPL	Dunfermline Athletic	3–0	Aberdeen	East End Park
15:00	Cardle 56'; Kirk 68', 77'	BBC Report		Attendance: 3,501; Referee: Charleston

2 May 2012 SPL	Inverness Caledonian Thistle	0–0	Dunfermline Athletic	Caledonian Stadium
15:00		BBC Sport		Attendance: 6,036; Referee: O'Reilly

7 May 2012 SPL	Hibernian	4–0	Dunfermline Athletic	Easter Road
19:45	Doherty 5'; Doyle 11'; O'Connor 15' (pen.); O'Hanlon 81'	BBC Sport		Attendance: 15,281; Referee: Norris

12 May 2012 SPL	Dunfermline Athletic	1–2	Kilmarnock	Rugby Park
15:00	Willis 20'	BBC Sport	Kelly 86'; Winchester 89'	Attendance: 3,276; Referee: Clancy

=== Scottish League Cup ===
Dunfermline will enter at the first round stage having competed in the First Division during the 2010–11 season.

30 July 2011 Scottish League Cup round 1	Annan Athletic	1–2	Dunfermline	Annan
15:00	Cox 21'	DAFC Report	Barrowman 17'; Kirk 51'	Stadium: Galabank; Attendance: 767; Referee: Richmond

23 August 2011 Scottish League Cup round 2	East Fife	2–1	Dunfermline	Methil
19:45	Linn 4'; Dalziel 54'	DAFC Report	Buchanan 12'	Stadium: Bayview Stadium; Attendance: 1,262; Referee: Charleston

=== Fife cup ===
30 August 2011 Fife Cup Semi-final	Dunfermline	0–1	Raith Rovers	Dunfermline
19:45		DAFC Report	Graham 90'	Stadium: East End Park; Attendance: 524; Referee: McGeachie

=== Scottish Cup ===
7 January 2012 Scottish Cup round 4	Inverness Caledonian Thistle	1–1	Dunfermline Athletic	Caledonian Stadium, Inverness
15:00	Gillet (red card) 29'; Hayes 90'	Sky Report	Barrowman 30'	Attendance: 1,601; Referee: Norris

18 January 2012 Scottish Cup round 4 Replay	Dunfermline Athletic	1–3 (a.e.t.)	Inverness Caledonian Thistle	East End Park, Dunfermline
19:45	Barrowman 40'	BBC Sport	Hayes 54'; A. Shinnie 93'; Tansey 110'	Attendance: 1,594; Referee: Norris

== Players ==
=== Starting XI ===

Most frequent starting line-up uses the team's most used formation: 4–4–2. The players used are those who have played the most games in each respective position, not necessarily who have played most games out of all the players.

=== Captains ===
No.	P	Name	Country	No. games	Notes
3	DF	McCann	(Scotland)	25	Club captain

Last updated: 13 May 2012
Source: Competitive match reports.
Competitive matches only
Matches started as captain only
Country: FIFA nationality; No.: Squad number; P: Position; Name: Player name; No. Games: Number of games started as captain.

=== Squad information ===
Last updated 13 May 2012

No.	Pos	Nat	Player	Total		SPL		Scottish Cup		League Cup		Fife Cup	
No.	Pos	Nat	Player	Apps	Goals	Apps	Goals	Apps	Goals	Apps	Goals	Apps	Goals
1	GK	(Scotland) SCO	Paul Gallacher	20	0	18	0	0	0	2	0	0	0
2	DF	(Scotland) SCO	Jason Thomson	14	1	12	1	0	0	2	0	0	0
2	MF	(Scotland) SCO	Mark Kerr	13	0	13	0	0	0	0	0	0	0
3	DF	(Scotland) SCO	Austin McCann	25	1	23	1	0	0	2	0	0	0
4	MF	(Scotland) SCO	Gary Mason	34	0	32	0	1	0	1	0	0	0
5	DF	(Scotland) SCO	Kevin Rutkiewicz	11	0	8	0	1	0	1	0	1	0
6	DF	(Scotland) SCO	Alex Keddie	40	0	36	0	2	0	2	0	0	0
7	MF	(England) ENG	Joe Cardle	39	8	36	8	2	0	1	0	0	0
8	MF	(Scotland) SCO	Martin Hardie	30	1	28	1	2	0	0	0	0	0
9	FW	(Scotland) SCO	Andrew Barrowman	26	6	22	3	2	2	2	1	0	0
10	FW	(Northern Ireland) NIR	Andy Kirk	40	12	36	11	2	0	2	1	0	0
11	MF	(Scotland) SCO	David Graham	41	2	38	2	2	0	1	0	0	0
12	FW	(Scotland) SCO	Steven McDougall	15	0	12	0	0	0	2	0	1	0
13	DF	(Scotland) SCO	Patrick Boyle	24	0	21	0	2	0	0	0	1	0
14	MF	(Scotland) SCO	Nick Phinn	2	0	1	0	0	0	0	0	1	0
15	DF	(Scotland) SCO	Andy Dowie	33	0	29	0	2	0	2	0	0	0
16	DF	(Scotland) SCO	John Potter	20	0	16	0	2	0	1	0	1	0
17	MF	(Scotland) SCO	Paul Burns	28	2	25	2	1	0	2	0	0	0
18	MF	(Scotland) SCO	Steven Bell	0	0	0	0	0	0	0	0	0	0
19	FW	(Scotland) SCO	Liam Buchanan	32	6	27	5	2	0	2	1	1	0
20	GK	(Scotland) SCO	Chris Smith	18	0	15	0	2	0	0	0	1	0
21	FW	(Scotland) SCO	Pat Clarke	4	0	3	0	0	0	0	0	1	0
22	MF	(Scotland) SCO	Paul Willis	24	1	21	1	1	0	1	0	1	0
23	MF	(Scotland) SCO	Ryan Thomson	29	2	24	2	2	0	2	0	1	0
24	MF	(Scotland) SCO	Kyle Hutton	9	0	9	0	0	0	0	0	0	0
25	GK	(Scotland) SCO	Iain Turner	4	0	4	0	0	0	0	0	0	0
26	DF	(Scotland) SCO	Jordan McMillan	11	1	11	1	0	0	0	0	0	0
26	MF	(Scotland) SCO	Craig Easton	4	0	3	0	0	0	0	0	1	0
27	GK	(Spain) ESP	Bernardo Domínguez	1	0	1	0	0	0	0	0	0	0
34	MF	(Scotland) SCO	Shaun Byrne	1	0	0	0	0	0	0	0	1	0
39	MF	(Scotland) SCO	Kerr Young	0	0	0	0	0	0	0	0	0	0
45	DF	(Scotland) SCO	Ross Millen	1	0	0	0	0	0	0	0	1	0

=== Disciplinary record ===
Includes all competitive matches.

Last updated 13 May 2012

Number	Position	Name	Scottish Premier League		Scottish Cup		League Cup		Total	
Number	Position	Name	Booked	Sent off (straight red)	Booked	Sent off (straight red)	Booked	Sent off (straight red)	Booked	Sent off (straight red)
1	GK	Paul Gallacher	0	0	0	0	0	0	0	0
2	DF	Jason Thomson	2	0	0	0	0	0	2	0
2	MF	Mark Kerr	4	0	0	0	0	0	4	0
3	DF	Austin McCann	7	0	0	0	0	0	7	0
4	MF	Gary Mason	1	1	0	0	0	0	1	1
5	DF	Kevin Rutkiewicz	1	0	0	0	0	0	1	0
6	DF	Alex Keddie	7	0	0	0	0	0	7	0
7	MF	Joe Cardle	2	0	0	0	0	0	2	0
8	MF	Martin Hardie	8	0	1	0	0	0	9	0
9	FW	Andrew Barrowman	2	0	0	0	0	0	2	0
10	FW	Andy Kirk	1	0	0	0	0	0	1	0
11	MF	David Graham	1	0	1	0	0	0	2	0
12	FW	Steven McDougall	0	0	0	0	0	0	0	0
13	DF	Patrick Boyle	2	0	0	0	0	0	2	0
14	MF	Nick Phinn	0	0	0	0	0	0	0	0
15	DF	Andy Dowie	4	0	1	0	0	0	5	0
16	DF	John Potter	2	1	0	0	0	0	2	1
17	MF	Paul Burns	5	0	0	0	1	0	6	0
18	MF	Steven Bell	0	0	0	0	0	0	0	0
19	FW	Liam Buchanan	0	0	0	0	0	0	0	0
20	GK	Chris Smith	0	0	0	0	0	0	0	0
21	FW	Pat Clarke	0	0	0	0	0	0	0	0
22	MF	Paul Willis	2	0	0	0	0	0	2	0
23	MF	Ryan Thomson	5	0	0	0	0	0	5	0
24	MF	Kyle Hutton	1	0	0	0	0	0	1	0
25	GK	Iain Turner	0	0	0	0	0	0	0	0
26	DF	Jordan McMillan	2	0	0	0	0	0	2	0
27	GK	Bernardo Domínguez	0	0	0	0	0	0	0	0
39	MF	Kerr Young	0	0	0	0	0	0	0	0

=== Goalscorers ===
Last updated 13 May 2012

Position	Name	SPL	Scottish Cup	League Cup	Total
1	Andy Kirk	11	0	1	12
2	Joe Cardle	8	0	0	8
3	Andrew Barrowman	3	2	1	6
=	Liam Buchanan	5	0	1	6
5	Ryan Thomson	2	0	0	2
=	Paul Burns	2	0	0	2
=	David Graham	2	0	0	2
8	Martin Hardie	1	0	0	1
=	Jason Thomson	1	0	0	1
=	Austin McCann	1	0	0	1
=	Jordan McMillan	1	0	0	1
=	Paul Willis	1	0	0	1

=== Awards ===
Last updated 13 May 2012

Nation	Name	Award	Month
(Scotland)	Paul Gallacher	Player of the Month	July/August

== Team statistics ==
=== League table ===
Pos	Team	Pld	W	D	L	GF	GA	GD	Pts	Qualification or relegation
8	St Mirren	38	9	16	13	39	51	−12	43	
9	Aberdeen	38	9	14	15	36	44	−8	41	
10	Inverness Caledonian Thistle	38	10	9	19	42	60	−18	39	
11	Hibernian	38	8	9	21	40	67	−27	33	
12	Dunfermline Athletic (R)	38	5	10	23	40	82	−42	25	Relegation to the First Division

Source: SPFL Archive
Rules for classification: 1) points; 2) goal difference; 3) number of goals scored.
(R) Relegated

== Transfers ==
=== Players in ===
Player	From	Fee
Kevin Rutkiewicz	St Johnstone	Free
Paul Burns	Queen of the South	Free
Patrick Boyle	Partick Thistle	Free
Andrew Barrowman	Ross County	Free
Paul Gallacher	St Mirren	Free
John Potter	St Mirren	Free
Craig Easton	Southend United	Free
Mark Kerr	Asteras Tripolis	Free
Jordan McMillan	Rangers	Free
Bernardo Domínguez	Huesca	Free

=== Players out ===
Player	To	Fee
Graham Bayne	Dundee	Free
Calum Woods	Huddersfield Town	Free
Alex Burke	Ayr United	Free
Neil McGregor	Dundee	Free
Chris Higgins	Queen of the South	Free
Jake Hyde	Dundee	Free
Jordan White	Drogheda United	Free
Greg Paterson	Forfar Athletic	Free
Kyle Allison	Linlithgow Rose	Free
Aaron Sommerville	Free agent	Free
Aaron Scott	Dunbar United	Free
Craig Easton	Free agent	Free

=== Loans in ===
Player	From	Fee
Jason Thomson	Heart of Midlothian	Loan
Iain Turner	Preston North End	Loan
Kyle Hutton	Rangers	Loan

=== Loans out ===
Player	From	Fee
Pat Clarke	Raith Rovers	Loan
John Potter	Dunfermline	Loan
