= 2010–11 Dunfermline Athletic F.C. season =

Dunfermline Athletic
2010–11 season
- Chairman: John Yorkston
- Manager: Jim McIntyre
- Stadium: East End Park
- Scottish First Division: 1st
- Scottish Cup: Fifth Round, Losers v Aberdeen
- Scottish League Cup: Third Round, Losers v Rangers
- Scottish Challenge Cup: Second Round, Losers v Queen of the South
- Top goalscorer: League: Andy Kirk (13); All: Andy Kirk (20)
- Highest home attendance: 11,052 (vs Raith Rovers, 23 April 2011)
- Lowest home attendance: 1,743 (vs Partick Thistle, 14 December 2010)
Home colours	Away colours

The 2010–11 season was Dunfermline Athletic's 4th and final season in the Scottish First Division after being relegated from the Scottish Premier League in 2007. On 30 April 2011, the Pars beat Morton to seal promotion back to the SPL.

== Pre-season ==
During preseason manager Jim McIntyre made two goalkeeper signings to bolster the squad. He signed Chris Smith, after his excellent performance on loan from St Mirren, and Kyle Allison as back up. Also signed are Ross County's Alex Keddie and Pat Clarke from Dundee. Pre-season results were awful including a 5-1 hammering by a Manchester United reserve squad.

== League table ==
Pos	Team	Pld	W	D	L	GF	GA	GD	Pts	Promotion, qualification or relegation
1	Dunfermline Athletic (C, P)	36	20	10	6	66	31	+35	70	Promotion to the Premier League
2	Raith Rovers	36	17	9	10	47	35	+12	60	
3	Falkirk	36	17	7	12	57	41	+16	58	
4	Queen of the South	36	14	7	15	54	53	+1	49	
5	Partick Thistle	36	12	11	13	44	39	+5	47	

Source: SPFL
Rules for classification: 1) points; 2) goal difference; 3) number of goals scored.
(C) Champions; (P) Promoted

== Top goalscorers ==
Position	Nation	Name	Division One	Scottish Cup	League Cup	Challenge Cup	Total
1	(Northern Ireland)	Andy Kirk	13	2	4	2	21
2	(Scotland)	Pat Clarke	9	1	0	0	10
3	(Scotland)	Martin Hardie	8	0	0	0	8

== Disciplinary record ==
Position	Nation	Name	Yellow	Red	Total
1	(Scotland)	Gary Mason	6	1	7
2	(England)	Calum Woods	6	0	6
3	(Scotland)	Willie Gibson	4	1	5
=	(Scotland)	Pat Clarke	5	0	5

== Match results ==
=== Division Summary ===
Round	1	2	3	4	5	6	7	8	9	10	11	12	13	14	15	16	17	18	19	20	21	22	23	24	25	26	27	28	29	30	31	32	33	34	35	36
Ground	A	H	A	A	H	H	A	A	H	A	H	A	H	H	H	H	A	H	A	A	H	A	A	H	H	A	A	H	A	H	A	A	H	H	A	H
Result	W	W	L	W	W	W	W	L	W	D	W	L	D	W	D	W	L	D	L	W	D	D	W	L	D	W	D	W	D	D	W	W	W	W	W	W
Position	3	2	3	2	2	1	1	1	1	2	2	2	2	1	1	1	1	2	2	2	2	2	2	2	2	2	2	2	2	2	1	1	1	1	1	1

Updated to match(es) played on 18 May 2011. Source: Statto.com
A = Away; H = Home; W = Win; D = Draw; L = Loss

=== Friendlies ===
10 July 2010 Friendly	Dunfermline Athletic	0 – 4	Hibernian	East End Park
			Dowie 23' (o.g.); Miller 37'; Riordan 53'; Stephens 72'	Attendance: 2,624; Referee: Stephen Finnie

13 July 2010 Friendly	East Fife	4 – 1	Dunfermline Athletic	Bayview Stadium
	Hislop 15'; Linn 34', 59'; Tansey 42'		Woods 68'

17 July 2010 Friendly	Dunfermline Athletic	1 – 5	Manchester United XI	East End Park
	Kirk 63'		King 1', 16'; Ajose 11'; Possebon 34'; Keane 85'	Attendance: 2,518; Referee: Dougie McDonald

21 July 2010 Friendly	Dunfermline Athletic	1 – 0	Aberdeen	East End Park
	Clarke 53'			Attendance: 1,037; Referee: Steven Nicholls

27 July 2010 Friendly	Dunfermline Athletic	3 – 1	Heart of Midlothian	East End Park
	Phinn 46'; Cardle 58', 69'		Elliot 85'	Attendance: 2,195; Referee: John McKendrick

=== League ===
7 August 2010 SFL1 #1	Falkirk	0 – 1	Dunfermline Athletic	Falkirk Stadium
			Clarke 17'	Attendance: 6,947; Referee: Calum Murray

14 August 2010 SFL1 #2	Dunfermline Athletic	2 – 0	Morton	East End Park
	Kirk 77', 83'			Attendance: 3,113; Referee: Alan Muir

21 August 2010 SFL1 #3	Raith Rovers	2 – 0	Dunfermline Athletic	Stark's Park
	Davidson 73'; Ellis 78'			Attendance: 6,169; Referee: Stevie O'Reilly

28 August 2010 SFL1 #4	Stirling Albion	1 – 5	Dunfermline Athletic	Forthbank Stadium
	Smith 34'		Bell 14'; Cardle 78'; Kirk 15', 88', 90'	Attendance: 1,370; Referee: Steven Nicholls

11 September 2010 SFL1 #5	Dunfermline Athletic	3 – 1	Dundee	East End Park
	Gibson 19' (pen.); Bell 41'; Clarke 76'		Harkins 51'	Attendance: 4,037; Referee: Steve Conroy

18 September 2010 SFL1 #6	Dunfermline Athletic	2 – 1	Cowdenbeath	East End Park
	Bell 63'; Cardle 77'		Dempster 7'	Attendance: 4,316; Referee: Charlie Richmond

25 September 2010 SFL1 #7	Partick Thistle	0 – 2	Dunfermline Athletic	Firhill Stadium
			Clarke 29'; Kirk 70'	Attendance: 2,188; Referee: Bobby Madden

2 October 2010 SFL1 #8	Queen of the South	2 – 0	Dunfermline Athletic	Palmerston Park
	Dowie 52' (o.g.); McLaren 62'			Attendance: 2,139; Referee: George Salmond

16 October 2010 SFL1 #9	Dunfermline Athletic	3 – 2	Ross County	East End Park
	Gibson 28'; Clarke 44'; McDougall 90'		Boyd 25'; Craig 48'	Attendance: 2,803; Referee: Steven McLean

23 October 2010 SFL1 #10	Dundee	2 – 2	Dunfermline Athletic	Dens Park
	Griffiths 48'; Higgins 81'		Gibson 30' (pen.), 33' (pen.)	Attendance: 5,636; Referee: Dougie McDonald

31 October 2010 SFL1 #11	Dunfermline Athletic	3 – 0	Stirling Albion	East End Park
	Gibson 18'; Kirk 30'; Woods 80'			Attendance: 3,025; Referee: John McKendrick

6 November 2010 SFL1 #12	Morton	2 – 1	Dunfermline Athletic	Cappielow
	Graham 24'; Monti 36' (pen.)		Gibson 83'	Attendance: 1,813; Referee: Mat Northcroft

13 November 2010 SFL1 #13	Dunfermline Athletic	2 – 2	Raith Rovers	East End Park
	Clarke 19'; Woods 31'		Williamson 83'; Walker 90'	Attendance: 7,158; Referee: Eddie Smith

11 December 2010 SFL1 #16	Dunfermline Athletic	1 – 0	Queen of the South	East End Park
	Cardle 87'			Attendance: 2,062; Referee: Stevie O'Reilly

14 December 2010 SFL1 #15 (Re-arranged)	Dunfermline Athletic	0 – 0	Partick Thistle	East End Park
				Attendance: 1,743; Referee: Craig Thomson

29 December 2010 SFL1 #23 (Re-arranged)	Dunfermline Athletic	5 – 0	Cowdenbeath	East End Park
	Kirk 28'; Clarke 63', 86'; Phinn 68'; Linton 89' (o.g.)			Attendance: 2,942; Referee: Bobby Madden

2 January 2011 SFL1 #19	Raith Rovers	2 – 1	Dunfermline Athletic	Stark's Park
	Campbell 51'; Tadé 71'		Phinn 54'	Attendance: 6,534; Referee: Charlie Richmond

15 January 2011 SFL1 #20	Dunfermline Athletic	0 – 0	Dundee	East End Park
				Attendance: 3,385; Referee: Craig Charleston

29 January 2011 SFL1 #22	Partick Thistle	2 – 0	Dunfermline Athletic	Firhill Stadium
	Erskine 14'; Doolan 42'			Attendance: 2,720; Referee: Alan Muir

12 February 2011 SFL1 #14 (Re-arranged)	Cowdenbeath	0 – 4	Dunfermline Athletic	Central Park
			Graham 46', 75'; Buchanan 69'; Kirk 84'	Attendance: 2,192; Referee: John McKendrick

15 February 2011 SFL1 #18 (Re-arranged)	Dunfermline Athletic	1 – 1	Falkirk	East End Park
	Kirk 85'		Scobbie 79'	Attendance: 5,082; Referee: Anthony Law

22 February 2011 SFL1 #17 (Re-arranged)	Ross County	0 – 0	Dunfermline Athletic	Victoria Park
				Attendance: 2,198; Referee: Mat Northcroft

26 February 2011 SFL1 #25	Queen of the South	1 – 3	Dunfermline Athletic	Palmerston Park
	McMenamin 68'		Buchanan 51'; Harris 55' (o.g.); Cardle 88'	Attendance: 2,052; Referee: Stevie O'Reilly

5 March 2011 SFL1 #26	Dunfermline Athletic	1 – 3	Morton	East End Park
	Buchanan 77'		Lyle 1'; O'Brien 48'; Weatherson 88'	Attendance: 2,867; Referee: Calum Murray

8 March 2011 SFL1 #24 (Re-arranged)	Dunfermline Athletic	1 – 1	Ross County	East End Park
	Kirk 81' (pen.)		Barrowman 67'	Attendance: 1,699; Referee: Steven McLean

12 March 2011 SFL1 #27	Falkirk	1 – 2	Dunfermline Athletic	Falkirk Stadium
	Millar 58' (pen.)		Woods 28'; Hardie 44'	Attendance: 5,121; Referee: Eddie Smith

15 March 2011 SFL1 #21 (Re-arranged)	Stirling Albion	1 – 1	Dunfermline Athletic	Forthbank Stadium
	Borris 32'		Kirk 5'	Attendance: 944; Referee: Steve Conroy

19 March 2011 SFL1 #28	Dunfermline Athletic	4 – 1	Stirling Albion	East End Park
	Hardie 31' (pen.), 45' (pen.), 90'; Buchanan 55'		Kane 75'	Attendance: 2,553; Referee: Steven Nicholls

22 March 2011 SFL1 #29	Dundee	1 – 1	Dunfermline Athletic	Dens Park
	Hyde (trialist) 71'		Burke 32'	Attendance: 4,507; Referee: Mike Tumilty

26 March 2011 SFL1 #30	Dunfermline Athletic	0 – 0	Partick Thistle	East End Park
				Attendance: 3,019; Referee: Charlie Richmond

29 March 2011 SFL1 #32 (Re-arranged)	Ross County	0 – 1	Dunfermline Athletic	Victoria Park
			Hardie 90'	Attendance: 2,059; Referee: David Somers

2 April 2011 SFL1 #31	Cowdenbeath	0 – 1	Dunfermline Athletic	Central Park
			Buchanan 60'	Attendance: 2,104; Referee: Mat Northcroft

16 April 2011 SFL1 #33	Dunfermline Athletic	6 – 1	Queen of the South	East End Park
	Hardie 32'; Graham 51', 69'; Higgins 65'; Kirk 76'; Clarke 82'		Harris 62'	Attendance: 3,255; Referee: Alan Muir

23 April 2011 SFL1 #34	Dunfermline Athletic	2 – 1	Raith Rovers	East End Park
	Hardie 55', 78'		Baird 41'	Attendance: 11,052; Referee: George Salmond

30 April 2011 SFL1 #35	Morton	0 – 2	Dunfermline Athletic	Cappielow
			McDougall 8'; Graham 51'	Attendance: 4,626; Referee: Brian Winter

7 May 2011 SFL1 #36	Dunfermline Athletic	3 – 0	Falkirk	East End Park
	Phinn 21', 52'; Clarke 87'			Attendance: 7,826; Referee: Steve Conroy

=== Scottish League Cup ===
31 July 2010 League Cup R1	Dunfermline Athletic	5 – 2	Arbroath	East End Park
	Kirk 13', 76'; Willis 75'; McDougall 82'; Malcolm 90' (o.g.)		Sheerin 12'; Swankie 88'	Attendance: 1,283; Referee: Craig Charleston

24 August 2010 League Cup R2	Dunfermline Athletic	3 – 2	Clyde	East End Park
	Kirk 44', 86'; McDougall 67'		Strachan 2'; McCusker 46'	Attendance: 1,107; Referee: Dougie McDonald

21 September 2010 League Cup R3	Rangers	7 – 2	Dunfermline Athletic	Ibrox Stadium
	Jelavić 21', 59'; Lafferty 23', 47', 71'; Bougherra 38'; Naismith 77'		Woods 41'; Cardle 46'	Attendance: 23,120; Referee: Euan Norris

=== Scottish Challenge Cup ===
24 July 2010 Challenge Cup R1 N&E	Dunfermline Athletic	1 – 0	Arbroath	East End Park
	Kirk 64'			Attendance: 976; Referee: Bobby Madden

10 August 2010 Challenge Cup R2	Dunfermline Athletic	1 – 1 (a.e.t.)	Queen of the South	East End Park
	Kirk 81'		Weatherston 53'	Attendance: 1,160; Referee: John McKendrick

=== Scottish Cup ===
8 January 2011 Scottish Cup R4	Montrose	2 – 2	Dunfermline Athletic	Links Park
	Tosh 27', 90'		Clarke 73'; Kirk 81'	Attendance: 1,030; Referee: Crawford Allan

18 January 2011 Scottish Cup R4 Replay	Dunfermline Athletic	5 – 3	Montrose	East End Park
	Kirk 11'; McDougall 40'; Graham 48', 52'; Gibson 61' (pen.)		Woods 47' (o.g.); Tosh 72', 88' (pen.)	Attendance: 1,541; Referee: Crawford Allan

6 February 2011 Scottish Cup R5	Aberdeen	1 – 0	Dunfermline Athletic	Pittodrie Stadium
	McGregor 90' (o.g.)			Attendance: 5,636; Referee: William Collum

== Transfers ==
=== In ===
Date	Player	From	Fee (£)
18 May 2010	(Scotland) Alex Keddie	Ross County	Free
26 May 2010	(Scotland) Kyle Allison	Inverness CT	Free
7 July 2010	(Scotland) Chris Smith	St Mirren	Free
15 July 2010	(Scotland) Pat Clarke	Dundee	Free
15 September 2010	(Scotland) Jack Ross	Free agent	Free
21 January 2011	(Scotland) Liam Buchanan	Partick Thistle	Free
11 February 2011	(Scotland) Martin Hardie	Free agent	Free

=== Out ===
Date	Player	To	Fee (£)
31 January 2011	(Scotland) Willie Gibson	Crawley Town	Undisclosed
3 February 2011	(Scotland) Jack Ross	Retired	

== See also ==
- 2010–11 Scottish First Division
- 2010–11 Scottish Cup
- 2010–11 Scottish League Cup
- 2010–11 in Scottish football
