= 2009–10 Scottish Cup =

Tournament details
- Country: Scotland
- Teams: 81

Final positions
- Champions: Dundee United (2nd title)
- Runners-up: Ross County

The 2009–10 Scottish Cup was the 125th season of Scotland's most prestigious football knockout competition. The competition was sponsored by the Scottish Government and for sponsorship reasons was known as the Active Nation Scottish Cup.

Dundee United won only their second Cup title, the first since 1993–94. As of 2026, it remains their most recent major honour.

== Calendar ==
Round	First match date	Fixtures		Clubs
Round	First match date	Original	Replays	Clubs
First Round	Saturday 26 September 2009	17	4	81 → 64
Second Round	Saturday 24 October 2009	16	3	64 → 48
Third Round	Saturday 28 November 2009	16	4	48 → 32
Fourth Round	Saturday 9 January 2010	16	4	32 → 16
Fifth Round	Saturday 6 February 2010	8	2	16 → 8
Quarter-finals	Saturday 13 March 2010	4	2	8 → 4
Semi-finals	Saturday/Sunday 10/11 April 2010, or following midweek	2	N/A	4 → 2
Final	Saturday 15 May 2010	1	N/A	2 → 1

From the First Round to the Third Round, postponed or drawn ties are normally replayed on the following weekend and thereafter on consecutive midweeks. From the Fourth Round to the Sixth Round, postponed or drawn ties are normally replayed on the second midweek after the original date, and thereafter on consecutive midweeks. There are no replays in the semi-finals or the Final.

== First round ==
The draw for the First Round was made at Hamilton Crescent, popularly known as the West of Scotland Cricket Ground, at 15:00 on 3 September 2009. Hamilton Crescent is now the oldest surviving ground to have hosted Scottish Cup Finals, and also hosted the first ever international football match.

This round is populated entirely by non-league clubs:

- 13 clubs from the Highland Football League holding membership of the SFA (Inverurie Loco Works, Keith, Wick Academy, Buckie Thistle, Fraserburgh, Huntly, Forres Mechanics, Nairn County, Clachnacuddin, Lossiemouth, Rothes, Brora Rangers, Fort William)
- 10 clubs from the East of Scotland League holding membership of the SFA (Edinburgh University, Whitehill Welfare, Preston Athletic, Edinburgh City, Coldstream, Selkirk, Civil Service Strollers, Gala Fairydean, Vale of Leithen, Hawick Royal Albert)
- 4 clubs from the South of Scotland League holding membership of the SFA (Dalbeattie Star, Wigtown & Bladnoch, St Cuthbert Wanderers, Newton Stewart)
- 4 other clubs holding membership of the SFA (Burntisland Shipyard, Girvan, Glasgow University, Golspie Sutherland)
- 4 qualifiers from the Scottish Junior Football Association (Auchinleck Talbot, Banks O' Dee, Bonnyrigg Rose Athletic, Irvine Meadow)

Burntisland Shipyard was the last club drawn and received a bye to the Second Round.

Four of the five Junior clubs (Girvan and the four qualifiers) won their ties, while Bonnyrigg Rose lost after a replay. Hawick Royal Albert's defeat by Huntly led to a police investigation of an allegation that the match had been fixed.

26 September 2009	Selkirk	3–0	Preston Athletic	Yarrow Park, Selkirk
15:00	Gass 44'; Black 63'; McManus 89'			Referee: Gavin Ross

26 September 2009	Clachnacuddin	2–2	Wick Academy	Grant Street Park, Inverness
15:00	Macdonald 24'; Williamson 77'		Allan 36'; Shearer 89'	Referee: Alastair Mather

26 September 2009	Auchinleck Talbot	7–0	Fort William	Beechwood Park, Auchinleck
15:00	Gillies 18'; Boyle 20', 52'; McIlroy 30' (pen.); McKelvie 59', 61'; Slavin 72'			Referee: Iain Craig

26 September 2009	Nairn County	5–2	Golspie Sutherland	Station Park, Nairn
15:00	Mackintosh 32'; Low 55', 67'; Campbell 80'; Barron 88'		Mikula 44', 47'	Referee: Graham Fraser

26 September 2009	Edinburgh University	0–3	Vale of Leithen	Peffermill, Edinburgh
15:00			Somerville 22', 60'; Sonko 89'	Referee: Stephen Allan

26 September 2009	Inverurie Loco Works	5–0	St Cuthbert Wanderers	Harlaw Park, Inverurie
15:00	Cormie 38'; Gauld 43'; Ross 71'; McLean 76'; Singer 80'			Referee: Steven George

26 September 2009	Coldstream	1–5	Edinburgh City	Home Park, Coldstream
15:00	Brydon 50'		Clee 35', 46'; Guthrie 44'; Gair 61'; Stenhouse 89'	Referee: Frank Connor

26 September 2009	Brora Rangers	0–2	Irvine Meadow XI	Dudgeon Park, Brora
15:00			Swift 41'; Dillon 48'	Referee: Bryan Braidwood

26 September 2009	Buckie Thistle	0–0	Forres Mechanics	Victoria Park, Buckie
15:00				Referee: Mat Northcroft

26 September 2009	Whitehill Welfare	1–1	Wigtown & Bladnoch	Ferguson Park, Rosewell
15:00	Kidd 86'		McGrindle 64'	Referee: Don Robertson

26 September 2009	Fraserburgh	1–1	Bonnyrigg Rose Athletic	Bellslea Park, Fraserburgh
15:00	Main 76' (pen.)		Mearns 85'	Referee: Alan Frew

26 September 2009	Glasgow University	1–4	Girvan	Garscube Sports Complex, Glasgow
15:00	Devenney 6'		McVittie 31'; Moffat 40'; Brown 48' (o.g.); Mitchell 81'	Referee: Colin Steven

26 September 2009	Lossiemouth	4–1	Newton Stewart	Grant Park, Lossiemouth
15:00	Urquhart 8'; McIntosh 29'; McMullen 54'; Scott 81'		Taylor 61'	Referee: Michael McNab

26 September 2009	Rothes	1–5	Banks O' Dee	Mackessack Park, Rothes
15:00	MacRae 14'		Phillips 41', 69'; Scaife 45'; Strachan 71', 73'	Referee: Morag Pirie

26 September 2009	Civil Service Strollers	1–0	Gala Fairydean	The Edinburgh Area Civil Service Sports Association, Edinburgh
15:00	Millar 13'			Referee: Alan Mulvanny

26 September 2009	Hawick Royal Albert	0–7	Huntly	Albert Park, Hawick
15:00			Kleczkowski 23' (pen.), 67', 75'; Soane 44'; Gray 53'; Brownhill 82'; Fraser 88'	Referee: Paul Robertson

26 September 2009	Dalbeattie Star	2–4	Keith	Islecroft Stadium, Dalbeattie
15:00	Fergusson 70'; Dingwall 71'		Walker 34', 76'; Niddrie 73'; Keith 86'	Referee: Greg Aitken

Source: BBC Sport

=== Replays ===
3 October 2009	Forres Mechanics	0–0 (a.e.t.) (1–4 p)	Buckie Thistle	Mosset Park, Forres
3.00pm				Referee: Alan Frew

3 October 2009	Wigtown & Bladnoch	0–3	Whitehill Welfare	Trammondford Park, Wigtown
3.00pm			Devlin 28', 66'; McGlashan 69'	Referee: Ross Haswell

3 October 2009	Bonnyrigg Rose Athletic	1–2	Fraserburgh	New Dundas Park, Bonnyrigg
3.00pm	Howatt 72'		Main 1'; Atai 59' (o.g.)	Referee: Neil McLennan

3 October 2009	Wick Academy	2–1	Clachnacuddin	Harmsworth Park, Wick
3.00pm	Weir 3', 90'		Morrison 45'	Referee: Alastair Mather

Source: BBC Sport

== Second round ==
The 17 winners and 1 bye from the First Round enter here, along with the 10 SFL Third Division clubs, and Cove Rangers (Highland League champions), Deveronvale (Highland League runners-up), Spartans (East of Scotland League champions), and Threave Rovers (South of Scotland League champions). The draw took place on Wednesday 30 September at Scotstoun Leisure Centre.

24 October 2009	Queen's Park	1–3	Livingston	Hampden Park, Glasgow
3.00pm	Quinn 78'	Report	De Vita 32', 83'; Fox 62' (pen.)	Attendance: 678; Referee: Steven McLean

24 October 2009	Nairn County	2–4	Elgin City	Station Park, Nairn
3.00pm	Barron 64'; Campbell 70'	Report	Frizzel 4', 32', 51' (pen.); Crooks 71' (pen.)	Attendance: 600; Referee: Bobby Madden

24 October 2009	Fraserburgh	1–4	Spartans	Bellslea Park, Fraserburgh
3.00pm	Main 49'; Main (red card) 90'		Sidwright 11'; Main 19' (o.g.); King 57'; Henretty 72'	Attendance: 389; Referee: Greg Aitken

24 October 2009	Deveronvale	2–2	Buckie Thistle	Princess Royal Park, Banff
3.00pm	Smith 35', 82'; Brown (red card) 76'; McGowan (red card) 90'		Stewart 6'; MacMillan 16'	Attendance: 1,025; Referee: Stephen Allan

24 October 2009	Whitehill Welfare	1–1	Threave Rovers	Ferguson Park, Rosewell
3.00pm	Haynes 74'		Kerr 46'	Attendance: 215; Referee: Euan Anderson

24 October 2009	Inverurie Loco Works	2–1	Stranraer	Harlaw Park, Inverurie
3.00pm	Singer 17'; Gauld 65'	Report	Moore 10'; Henderson (red card) 76'	Attendance: 410; Referee: Brian Colvin

24 October 2009	Vale of Leithen	1–3	Keith	Victoria Park, Innerleithen
3.00pm	Somerville 26'		MacKay 5', 63'; Harris 81'	Attendance: 73; Referee: Don Robertson

24 October 2009	Forfar Athletic	4–2	East Stirlingshire	Station Park, Forfar
3.00pm	Campbell 25', 73'; Tod 34'; Harty 90' (pen.)	Report	Rodgers 46'; Dunn 63'; Bolochoweckyj (red card) 12'	Attendance: 396; Referee: Frank McDermott

24 October 2009	Cove Rangers	2–1	Annan Athletic	Allan Park, Aberdeen
3.00pm	Stephen 64'; Henderson 82'; Tindal (red card) 29'	Report	Watson 28'	Attendance: 278; Referee: Kevin Clancy

24 October 2009	Selkirk	0–3	Irvine Meadow XI	Yarrow Park, Selkirk
3.00pm			Wingate 14'; Barr 66', 83'	Attendance: 238; Referee: Iain Craig

24 October 2009	Girvan	1–4	Wick Academy	Hamilton Park, Girvan
3.00pm	Murphy 14'; Murphy (red card) 60'		Mackay 53'; MacAdie 61' (pen.); Allan 65'; Shearer 68'	Attendance: 180; Referee: Paul Reid

24 October 2009	Lossiemouth	0–2	Albion Rovers	Grant Park, Lossiemouth
3.00pm		Report	Barr 5'; Walker 88'	Attendance: 235; Referee: Neil Watters

24 October 2009	Edinburgh City	5–1	Burntisland Shipyard	Meadowbank Stadium, Edinburgh
3.00pm	Denholn 10'; McFarland 23'; Clee 36', 80'; Ross 87'		O'Hanlon 38' (pen.)	Attendance: 123; Referee: Kevin Graham

24 October 2009	Banks O' Dee	0–3	Montrose	Spain Park, Aberdeen
3.00pm		Report	Watson 57'; Sinclair 78'; Campbell 89'	Attendance: 400; Referee: Des Roache

24 October 2009	Huntly	1–1	Auchinleck Talbot	Christie Park, Huntly
3.00pm	Lombardi 90'; Kleczkowski (red card) 79'		Slavin 38'	Attendance: 488; Referee: Alastair Mather

24 October 2009	Civil Service Strollers	1–2	Berwick Rangers	Edinburgh Area Civil Service Sports Association, Edinburgh
3.00pm	Burgess 32'	Report	Little 59'; Brazil 69'	Attendance: 387; Referee: Thomas Robertson

Source: BBC Sport

=== Replays ===
31 October 2009	Auchinleck Talbot	4–3	Huntly	Beechwood Park, Auchinleck
1.30pm	Slavin 4'; Boyle 29'; White 39'; McKelvie 86'		Ewen 57'; Fraser 83'; Soane 90'	Referee: Alastair Mather

31 October 2009	Buckie Thistle	1–3 (a.e.t.)	Deveronvale	Victoria Park, Buckie
3.00pm	Bruce 80'		McKenzie 16'; McGowan 115'; Smith 120'	Attendance: 1,100; Referee: Stephen Allan

31 October 2009	Threave Rovers	1–0	Whitehill Welfare	Meadow Park, Castle Douglas
3.00pm	Warren 60'			Attendance: 269; Referee: Euan Anderson

Source: BBC Sport

== Third round ==
The 16 winners from the Second Round enter here, along with the 10 SFL Second Division clubs, and 6 SFL First Division clubs (as the side relegated from the SPL and the clubs which finished 2nd, 3rd and 4th enter in the Fourth Round). The draw took place on Wednesday 28 October.

28 November 2009	Airdrie United	4–0	Queen of the South	Excelsior Stadium, Airdrie
3.00pm	Trouten 11', 39'; Baird 23'; O'Carroll 65'	Report		Attendance: 1,141; Referee: Euan Norris

28 November 2009	Ross County	5–1	Berwick Rangers	Victoria Park, Dingwall
3.00pm	di Giacomo 38', 40'; Lawson 42'; Craig 82'; Wood 87'	Report	Brazil 77'	Attendance: 819; Referee: Bobby Madden

28 November 2009	Threave Rovers	1–2	Inverurie Loco Works	Meadow Park, Castle Douglas
3.00pm	Struthers 89'	Report	Park 6'; Morrison 71'	Attendance: 520; Referee: John Beaton

28 November 2009	Deveronvale	0–1	Ayr United	Princess Royal Park, Banff
3.00pm		Report	Stevenson 71'	Attendance: 192; Referee: Neil Watters

28 November 2009	Cowdenbeath	0–0	Alloa Athletic	Central Park, Cowdenbeath
3.00pm		Report		Attendance: 377; Referee: Brian Colvin

28 November 2009	Albion Rovers	1–0	Elgin City	Cliftonhill, Coatbridge
3.00pm	Pollock 62'	Report		Attendance: 275; Referee: Gary Hilland

28 November 2009	Stirling Albion	2–1	Auchinleck Talbot	Forthbank Stadium, Stirling
3.00pm	Corr 10'; Forsyth 64'	Report	McIlroy 35' (pen.)	Attendance: 1,185; Referee: Craig MacKay

28 November 2009	Irvine Meadow XI	1–0	Arbroath	Meadow Park, Irvine
1.30pm	Barr 36'	Report		Attendance: 1,150; Referee: Kevin Clancy

28 November 2009	Edinburgh City	3–1	Keith	Meadowbank Stadium, Edinburgh
3.00pm	Nicol 19' (o.g.); Gair 24', 70'	Report	Harris 90'	Attendance: 177; Referee: Craig Charleston

28 November 2009	Wick Academy	4–4	Brechin City	Harmsworth Park, Wick
3.00pm	Allan 8', 45'; MacKay 32', 60' (pen.)	Report	King 12', 85'; Byers 17'; McAllister 75'	Attendance: 177; Referee: Colin Brown

28 November 2009	Greenock Morton	0–0	Dumbarton	Cappielow, Greenock
3.00pm		Report		Attendance: 1,882; Referee: Steven McLean

28 November 2009	Montrose	2–1	East Fife	Links Park, Montrose
3.00pm	Watson 57'; Gemmell 88'	Report	McManus 61'	Attendance: 509; Referee: Frank McDermott

28 November 2009	Raith Rovers	0–0	Peterhead	Stark's Park, Kirkcaldy
3.00pm		Report		Attendance: 1,418; Referee: George Salmond

28 November 2009	Spartans	0–1	Forfar Athletic	Ainslie Park, Edinburgh
3.00pm		Report	Templeman 55'	Attendance: 600; Referee: John McKendrick

5 December 2009	Stenhousemuir	5–0	Cove Rangers	Ochilview Park, Stenhousemuir
3.00pm	Motion 1', 34'; Molloy 2'; Bradley 13'; Thomson 30'	Report		Attendance: 409; Referee: Thomas Robertson

9 December 2009	Clyde	1–1	Livingston	Broadwood Stadium, Cumbernauld
7.45pm	Lithgow 63'	Report	Hamill 48'	Attendance: 538; Referee: Craig Charleston

Source: BBC Sport

=== Replays ===
1 December 2009	Peterhead	1–4	Raith Rovers	Balmoor, Peterhead
7.45pm	Stewart 87'	Report	D.Smith 46', 74'; K.Smith 59'; Simmons 90'	Attendance: 537; Referee: Stephen Finnie

5 December 2009	Dumbarton	0–1	Greenock Morton	Strathclyde Homes Stadium, Dumbarton
3.00pm		Report	Graham 74'	Attendance: 1,495; Referee: Steven McLean

8 December 2009	Brechin City	4–2	Wick Academy	Glebe Park, Brechin
3.00pm	Fusco 17'; Docherty 42'; McAllister 57', 72'	Report	MacKay 39' (pen.); MacAdie 82'	Attendance: 402; Referee: Crawford Allan

8 December 2009	Alloa Athletic	1–0	Cowdenbeath	Recreation Park, Alloa
7.45pm	Gilhaney 88'	Report		Attendance: 423; Referee: Brian Colvin

14 December	Livingston	7–1	Clyde	Almondvale Stadium, Livingston
7.45pm	Jacobs 5'; Fox 49', 80'; Winters 50', 67'; Halliday 51', 65'	Report	Lithgow 11'	Attendance: 690; Referee: Craig Charleston

Source: BBC Sport

== Fourth round ==
The 16 winners from the Third Round entered here, along with the 12 SPL clubs and four SFL First Division clubs who were exempt from playing in the Third Round. The draw took place on Monday 30 November at 2:30pm at Hampden Park. The matches were scheduled for 9 January or 10 January 2010, but 10 games were postponed due to the severe weather conditions.

There was controversy as First Division side, Dunfermline Athletic, fielded an ineligible player in their match against Stenhousemuir. As well as this, the club's management failed to register the two mandatory under-21 players required by the rules and submitted an inaccurate team sheet. As a result of these breaches in the rules, Dunfermline Athletic were to be expelled from the competition and Stenhousemuir were to progress their stead. However following an appeal by the club, a committee decided that expulsion from the competition was too harsh a punishment and wasn't merited by what the club's management described as "honest errors". The club were given a reprieve along with fines and forfeits of benefits totalling around £30,000. Furthermore, the result of the game was overturned and the fixture was replayed at Ochilview Park to decide which team progressed in the competition.

18 January 2010	Inverness Caledonian Thistle	2–0	Motherwell	Caledonian Stadium, Inverness
19:45	Bulvītis 43'; Imrie 62'	Report		Attendance: 1,450; Referee: Iain Brines

10 January 2010	Hamilton Academical	3–3	Rangers	New Douglas Park, Hamilton
12:15	Mensing 39' (pen.); M. Paixão 45'; Antoine-Curier 45'	Report	Whittaker 4'; Miller 30', 63' (pen.)	Attendance: 3,940; Referee: Charlie Richmond

19 January 2010	Greenock Morton	0–1	Celtic	Cappielow, Greenock
19:45		Report	McGinn 35'	Attendance: 10,191; Referee: Craig Thomson

9 January 2010	Hibernian	3–0	Irvine Meadow XI	Easter Road, Edinburgh
15:00	Riordan 32'; Zemmama 42'; Hanlon 59'	Report		Attendance: 10,197; Referee: Euan Norris

9 January 2010	St Mirren	3–1	Alloa Athletic	St Mirren Park, Paisley
15:00	Crawford 27' (o.g.); Mehmet 45', 87'	Report	Brown 34'	Attendance: 2,587; Referee: Stephen Finnie

25 January 2010	Raith Rovers	1–1	Airdrie United	Stark's Park, Kirkcaldy
19:45	Simmons (red card) 28'; Smyth 56' (o.g.)	Report	Baird 5'	Attendance: 1,599; Referee: Steven Nicholls

9 January 2010	Dunfermline Athletic	7–1	Stenhousemuir	East End Park, Dunfermline
15:00	Gibson 15'; Kirk 17', 83' (pen.); Phinn 21'; Graham 35'; McDougall 63'; Cardle 69'	Report	Bradley 90'	Attendance: 1,832; Referee: Bobby Madden

18 January 2010	Forfar Athletic	0–3	St Johnstone	Station Park, Forfar
19:45		Report	Deuchar 23'; Craig 43', 58'	Attendance: 1,449; Referee: Calum Murray

20 January 2010	Livingston	0–1	Dundee	Almondvale Stadium, Livingston
19:45		Report	Harkins 33'	Attendance: 1,176; Referee: William Collum

18 January 2010	Albion Rovers	0–0	Stirling Albion	Cliftonhill, Coatbridge
19:45		Report		Attendance: 395; Referee: George Salmond

9 January 2010	Aberdeen	2–0	Heart of Midlothian	Pittodrie Stadium, Aberdeen
15:00	Mackie 60'; Miller 76'	Report		Attendance: 8,226; Referee: Steve Conroy

18 January 2010	Edinburgh City	1–3	Montrose	Meadowbank Stadium, Edinburgh
19:45	Gair 37'	Report	Nicholas 20'; Maitland 71'; Nicol 84'	Attendance: 1,027; Referee: Colin Brown

9 January 2010	Partick Thistle	0–2	Dundee United	Firhill Stadium, Glasgow
15:00		Report	Casalinuovo 26'; Goodwillie 90'	Attendance: 4,002; Referee: Dougie McDonald

18 January 2010	Ross County	4–0	Inverurie Loco Works	Victoria Park, Dingwall
19:45	Craig 37', 56'; Morrison 53'; Miller 73'	Report		Attendance: 835; Referee: Steven McLean

18 January 2010	Ayr United	1–0	Brechin City	Somerset Park, Ayr
19:45	Roberts 3'	Report		Attendance: 1,139; Referee: John McKendrick

18 January 2010	Kilmarnock	1–0	Falkirk	Rugby Park, Kilmarnock
19:45	Pascali 83'	Report		Attendance: 3,378; Referee: Mike Tumilty

Source: BBC Sport

=== Replays ===
27 January 2010	Airdrie United	1–3	Raith Rovers	Excelsior Stadium, Airdrie
19:45	Donnelly 39'; Robertson (yellow card) 90' (red card)	Report	K.Smith 24'; Tadé 45'; Russell 90' (pen.)	Attendance: 852; Referee: Steven Nicholls

19 January 2010	Rangers	2–0 (a.e.t.)	Hamilton Academical	Ibrox Stadium, Glasgow
19:45	Whittaker 98', 99'	Report		Attendance: 21,856; Referee: Charlie Richmond

26 January 2010	Stenhousemuir	1–2 (a.e.t.)	Dunfermline Athletic	Ochilview Park, Stenhousemuir
19:30	Bradley 67' (pen.)	Report	Cardle 35'; Kirk 112'	Attendance: 1,810; Referee: Bobby Madden

20 January 2010	Stirling Albion	3–1	Albion Rovers	Forthbank Stadium, Stirling
19:30	Mullen 9', 33'; Murphy 43'	Report	Walker 18'	Attendance: 355; Referee: George Salmond

Source: BBC Sport

== Fifth round ==
The Draw for the Fifth Round was made on Sunday 10 January at approximately 2:15pm at New Douglas Park. It featured the 16 winners of Round 4. The ties were played on 6 & 7 February.

7 February 2010	Dunfermline Athletic	2–4	Celtic	East End Park, Dunfermline
12:15	Graham 21'; Kirk 28' (pen.)	Report	Kamara 20'; Rasmussen 43'; Woods 59' (o.g.); Keane 68' (pen.)	Attendance: 8,933; Referee: Charlie Richmond

6 February 2010	St Johnstone	0–1	Dundee United	McDiarmid Park, Perth
15:00		Report	Goodwillie 45'	Attendance: 5,636; Referee: Craig Thomson

6 February 2010	Hibernian	5–1	Montrose	Easter Road, Edinburgh
15:00	Nish 5', 25'; Riordan 70'; Benjelloun 78'; Gow 89'	Report	Hegarty 74'	Attendance: 9,068; Referee: Alan Muir

6 February 2010	Dundee	2–1	Ayr United	Dens Park, Dundee
15:00	Hutchinson 41'; Griffiths 70'	Report	McManus 11'	Attendance: 2,852; Referee: Dougie McDonald

6 February 2010	Raith Rovers	1–1	Aberdeen	Stark's Park, Kirkcaldy
15:00	Williamson 31'	Report	McDonald 90'	Attendance: 7,045; Referee: William Collum

6 February 2010	Kilmarnock	3–0	Inverness Caledonian Thistle	Rugby Park, Kilmarnock
15:00	Sammon 28'; Kelly 36', 59'	Report		Attendance: 4,473; Referee: Stevie O'Reilly

6 February 2010	St Mirren	0–0	Rangers	St Mirren Park, Paisley
12:30		Report		Attendance: 4,909; Referee: Iain Brines

6 February 2010	Ross County	9–0	Stirling Albion	Victoria Park, Dingwall
15:00	Keddie 3'; Gardyne 15', 20'; Wood 55', 59', 90'; Brittain 66' (pen.); Kettlewell 83'; Morrison 84'	Report		Attendance: 1,365; Referee: Euan Norris

Source: BBC Sport

=== Replays ===
17 February 2010	Rangers	1–0	St Mirren	Ibrox Stadium, Glasgow
19:45	Boyd 86'	Report		Attendance: 31,086; Referee: Iain Brines

16 February 2010	Aberdeen	0–1	Raith Rovers	Pittodrie Stadium, Aberdeen
19:45		Report	Tadé 58'	Attendance: 8,153; Referee: David Somers

Source: BBC Sport

== Quarter-finals ==
The quarter-final draw took place on Wednesday 10 February at 1pm at Hampden Park.

14 March 2010	Rangers	3–3	Dundee United	Ibrox Stadium, Glasgow
12:05	Boyd 34' (pen.), 43' (pen.); Novo 48'	Report	Shala 24'; Whittaker 63' (o.g.); Kovačević 80'	Attendance: 24,096; Referee: Dougie McDonald

13 March 2010	Hibernian	2–2	Ross County	Easter Road, Edinburgh
14:00	Nish 7'; Riordan 19'	Report	Murray 16' (o.g.); Gardyne 79'	Attendance: 9,857; Referee: Brian Winter

13 March 2010	Kilmarnock	0–3	Celtic	Rugby Park, Kilmarnock
12:15		Report	Keane 64', 81', 82'	Attendance: 7,351; Referee: Iain Brines

13 March 2010	Dundee	1–2	Raith Rovers	Dens Park, Dundee
15:00	Forsyth 73'	Report	Simmons 3'; Ellis 10'	Attendance: 7,306; Referee: Charlie Richmond

Source: BBC Sport

=== Replays ===
23 March 2010	Ross County	2–1	Hibernian	Victoria Park, Dingwall
19:45	Wood 70'; Boyd 90'	Report	Stokes 46'	Attendance: 5,607; Referee: Brian Winter

24 March 2010	Dundee United	1–0	Rangers	Tannadice Park, Dundee
19:45	D. Robertson 90'	Report		Attendance: 11,898; Referee: Dougie McDonald

Source: BBC Sport

== Semi-finals ==
The semi-final draw took place in Hampden Park on Monday 15 March at 10.30am.

10 April 2010	Celtic	0–2	Ross County	Hampden Park, Glasgow
12:15		Report	Craig 55'; Scott 88'	Attendance: 24,535; Referee: William Collum

11 April 2010	Dundee United	2–0	Raith Rovers	Hampden Park, Glasgow
15:00	Goodwillie 28'; Webster 59'	Report		Attendance: 17,671; Referee: Craig Thomson

Source: BBC Sport

== Final ==
15 May 2010	Ross County	0–3	Dundee United	Hampden Park, Glasgow
15:00		Report	Goodwillie 61'; Conway 75', 86'	Attendance: 47,122; Referee: Dougie McDonald

Source: BBC Sport

== Media coverage ==
- Domestically, both Sky Sports and BBC Sport Scotland broadcast selected live games, with both showing the final. Both also carry highlights of all games in every round.
- BBC Radio Scotland has exclusive domestic radio rights to the tournament.
- Through the SFA's international media partner IMG, the Scottish Cup is broadcast in various territories around the world. In Australia, for example, the Scottish Cup is currently available on Setanta Sports.

These matches were broadcast live on television.

Round	Sky Sports	BBC Scotland
Fourth round	Hamilton Academical vs Rangers; Rangers vs Hamilton Academical (Replay)	
Fifth round	Dunfermline Athletic vs Celtic; Rangers vs St Mirren (Replay)	St Mirren vs Rangers
Quarter-finals	Kilmarnock vs Celtic; Dundee United vs Rangers (Replay)	Rangers vs Dundee United
Semi-finals	Celtic vs Ross County	Raith Rovers vs Dundee United
Final	Ross County vs Dundee United	Ross County vs Dundee United
