= Liam Buchanan =

Scottish footballer (born 1985)

Personal information
- Date of birth: 27 March 1985 (age 41)
- Place of birth: Edinburgh, Scotland
- Height: 5 ft 9 in (1.75 m)
- Position: Forward

Team information
- Current team: Musselburgh Athletic

Youth career
- 2002: Heart of Midlothian

Senior career*
Years	Team	Apps	(Gls)
2002–2007	Cowdenbeath	133	(54)
2007–2011	Partick Thistle	84	(30)
2011–2012	Dunfermline Athletic	44	(11)
2012	Sligo Rovers	10	(2)
2012–2013	Airdrie United	6	(0)
2013	Ayr United	14	(6)
2013–2014	East Fife	35	(11)
2014–2015	Alloa Athletic	33	(14)
2015–2017	Livingston	71	(33)
2017–2019	Raith Rovers	67	(22)
2019–2021	Alloa Athletic	42	(4)
2021–2022	Cowdenbeath	34	(6)
2022–2025	Berwick Rangers	90	(55)
2023–2024	→ Bonnyrigg Rose (loan)	10	(1)
2025–	Musselburgh Athletic	0	(0)
- * Club domestic league appearances and goals as of 28 March 2026

Liam Buchanan (born 27 March 1985) is a Scottish professional footballer who last played as a striker for East of Scotland League club Musselburgh Athletic.

A product of the Hearts youth system, Buchanan made his breakthrough at Cowdenbeath. Having spent five years at the Fife club, he joined Scottish Football League First Division side Partick Thistle and subsequently Dunfermline Athletic. After spells in the lower divisions of Scottish football, Buchanan then joined Scottish League One side East Fife. After a successful time in Methil, he moved to Scottish Championship side Alloa Athletic in July 2014 before signing with Livingston a year later. He then joined Raith Rovers in 2017 and two years later returned for a second spell with Alloa.

== Career ==
Born in Edinburgh, Buchanan made his breakthrough in football at Cowdenbeath, progressing through their youth system to play in the first team. Buchanan was prolific for the Central Park club, finishing top goalscorer in seasons 2005–06 and 2006–07.

Buchanan then signed for Partick Thistle at the start of the 2007–08 season. Buchanan was the Firhill club's top scorer that season, despite suffering a long-term injury early in 2008 and being out until October that same year, when he played in his return match against Airdrie United. Buchanan predominantly played in the number 9 shirt and was thought to be the next big prospect at the club. Buchanan notched 14 goals in that first season, from 27 starts and three substitute appearances.

In January 2011, Buchanan signed for Dunfermline Athletic. Buchanan helped the club win the 2010–11 Scottish First Division that gained promotion to the Scottish Premier League. The club finished bottom of the table in the 2011–12 Scottish Premier League season and were automatically relegated into the Scottish Football League First Division.

In August 2012, it was confirmed that Buchanan had rejected a new contract with Dunfermline and signed for Sligo Rovers. On 7 December 2012, Buchanan signed for Airdrie United. Buchanan left Airdrie on 10 January 2013 and then signed for Ayr United until the end of the 2012–13 season.

On 26 July 2013, Buchanan signed for East Fife. After one season there, he signed for Alloa. Buchanan then spent two seasons with Livingston, where the club were relegated and subsequently promoted the next season to the Scottish Championship. Buchanan, however, remained in Scottish League One, signing for recently relegated club Raith Rovers on 9 June 2017.

On 7 June 2019, Buchanan signed for Alloa Athletic for a second time.

On 22 June 2022, Buchanan signed for Berwick Rangers of the Lowland Football League. In his first season outside the SPFL, he was the Lowland League's top goalscorer with 22 goals.

After a strong start to the 2023-24 season, including a hat-trick against Edinburgh University, Buchanan earned a move back to the SPFL at the age of 38. Bonnyrigg Rose announced they had signed the forward on loan, with a view to a permanent transfer in the January window. Buchanan managed only one league goal in 10 outings and returned to Berwick in January, scoring twice in a 4-0 win against Broomhill on his return. In December 2025, he was released from his contract with Berwick Rangers.

== Career statistics ==
As of match played 24 April 2021

Appearances and goals by club, season and competition
Club	Season	League			Scottish Cup		League Cup		Other		Total	
Club	Season	Division	Apps	Goals	Apps	Goals	Apps	Goals	Apps	Goals	Apps	Goals
Cowdenbeath	2002–03	Scottish Second Division	12	2	2	0	0	0	0	0	14	2
Cowdenbeath	2003–04	Scottish Third Division	25	8	3	1	1	0	1 (Note: Appearances in the Scottish Challenge Cup)	0	30	9
Cowdenbeath	2004–05	Scottish Third Division	29	7	1	1	1	0	2	0	33	8
Cowdenbeath	2005–06	Scottish Third Division	31	17	1	0	0	0	1	0	33	17
Cowdenbeath	2006–07	Scottish Second Division	36	20	3	2	2	1	2	0	43	23
Cowdenbeath	Total		133	54	10	4	4	1	6	0	153	59
Partick Thistle	2007–08	Scottish First Division	22	11	4	3	3	0	2	0	31	14
Partick Thistle	2008–09	Scottish First Division	19	6	2	1	0	0	1	0	22	7
Partick Thistle	2009–10	Scottish First Division	26	10	1	0	2	2	2	2	31	14
Partick Thistle	2010–11	Scottish First Division	17	3	3	1	2	0	4	1	26	5
Partick Thistle	Total		84	30	10	5	7	0	9	3	110	38
Dunfermline Athletic	2010–11	Scottish First Division	17	5	0	0	0	0	0	0	17	5
Dunfermline Athletic	2011–12	Scottish Premier League	27	5	2	0	2	1	0	0	31	6
Dunfermline Athletic	Total		44	10	2	0	2	1	0	0	48	11
Sligo Rovers	2012	League of Ireland Premier Division	10	2	0	0	0	0	0	0	10	2
Airdrie United	2012–13	Scottish First Division	6	0	0	0	0	0	0	0	6	0
Ayr United	2012–13	Scottish Second Division	14	6	0	0	0	0	0	0	14	6
East Fife	2013–14	Scottish League One	35	11	1	0	1	2	5 (Note: One appearance and a goal in the Scottish Challenge Cup; four appearances in the Scottish League One play-offs)	1	42	14
Alloa Athletic	2014–15	Scottish Championship	33	14	3	2	2	0	9 (Note: Five appearances in the Scottish Challenge Cup; four appearances and a goal in the Scottish Championship play-offs)	1	47	17
Livingston	2015–16	Scottish Championship	35	11	2	0	3	1	5 (Note: Three appearances in the Scottish Challenge Cup; two appearances and two goals in the Scottish Championship play-offs)	2	45	14
Livingston	2016–17	Scottish League One	36	22	2	0	3	1	4	4	45	27
Livingston	Total		71	33	4	0	6	2	9	6	90	41
Raith Rovers	2017–18	Scottish League One	33	10	1	0	4	3	3 (Note: Two appearances and one goal in the Scottish Challenge Cup; one appearance in the Scottish Championship play-offs)	1	41	14
Raith Rovers	2018–19	Scottish League One	34	12	3	1	1	0	4 (Note: One appearance in the Scottish Challenge Cup; three appearances in the Scottish Championship play-offs)	0	42	13
Raith Rovers	Total		67	22	4	1	5	3	7	1	83	27
Alloa Athletic	2019–20	Scottish Championship	23	1	2	0	4	3	2	0	31	4
Alloa Athletic	2020–21	Scottish Championship	19	3	1	0	6	3	—		26	6
Alloa Athletic	Total		42	4	3	0	10	6	2	0	57	10
Career total			539	186	37	12	37	17	47	12	660	227

== Honours ==
=== Club ===
Dunfermline Athletic

- Scottish First Division: 2010–11

Sligo Rovers

- League of Ireland Premier Division: 2012

Livingston

- Scottish League One: 2016–17

=== Individual ===
- Scottish Football League Young Player of the Month: December 2006
- PFA Scotland Scottish Second Division Team of the Year: 2006–07
- Scottish League One Player of the Month: October 2016
- PFA Scotland Scottish League One Team of the Year: 2016–17
- PFA Scotland Scottish League One Player of the Year: 2016–17
