= Bernardo Domínguez =

Spanish footballer (born 1979)

Bernardo
Personal information
- Full name: Bernardo Domínguez Fernández
- Date of birth: 6 July 1979 (age 47)
- Place of birth: Zafra, Spain
- Height: 1.85 m (6 ft 1 in)
- Position: Goalkeeper

Senior career*
Years	Team	Apps	(Gls)
1998–2000	Oviedo B	37	(0)
2000–2001	Siero	6	(0)
2001–2002	Amurrio	12	(0)
2002–2003	Orihuela	2	(0)
2003–2005	Huesca	37	(0)
2005–2009	Alavés	64	(0)
2005–2007	→ Tenerife (loan)	60	(0)
2009–2011	Recreativo	15	(0)
2011–2012	Huesca	6	(0)
2012	Dunfermline Athletic	1	(0)
2013–2014	Mirandés	6	(0)
2015	Leioa	3	(0)
2015–2016	Betoño-Elgorriaga		
2016–2017	Amurrio	14	(0)
Total		263	(0)
- * Club domestic league appearances and goals

Bernardo Domínguez Fernández (born 6 July 1979), known simply as Bernardo, is a Spanish former professional footballer who played as a goalkeeper.

== Club career ==
Born in Zafra, Province of Badajoz, Bernardo started playing professionally with Real Oviedo. In the 1999–2000 season he was part the club's La Liga roster, but would only appear officially with the reserves during his spell in Asturias, subsequently resuming his career in Segunda División B.

In 2005, Bernardo returned to the professionals with Deportivo Alavés in Segunda División, who loaned him for two seasons to fellow league side CD Tenerife. He was first-choice in three of those four campaigns – being relegated in 2008–09 with the Basques – then backed up Vicente Guaita and Fabri at Recreativo de Huelva (also in that level) for two years.

In the summer of 2011, Bernardo joined SD Huesca of the second tier. He was released in the following transfer window, joining Dunfermline Athletic in early April 2012 and being Jim Jefferies' first signing as team manager.

Bernardo made his Scottish Premier League on the final day of the season in a 1–2 home loss against Kilmarnock, but left the club a week later when his short-term contract expired. Subsequently, he spent two years as backup in second-tier's CD Mirandés.
