= Paul Kirk (footballer) =

Northern Ireland footballer and manager

Paul Kirk (born 13 May 1953) is a Northern Irish retired football player and manager.

== Playing career ==
A forward, Paul Kirk played football during his career for Ballymena United, Glentoran, Crusaders, and Linfield, winning the league title with three of the four clubs. He also had a spell with Aston Villa in the 70s. Kirk played for the Glens in the 1970–71 European Cup against Waterford United and Eintracht Frankfurt. Eight years later he joined Waterford Utd where he won the FAI Cup and league cup in 1980. Kirk scored twice against Hibernians F.C. in the 1980–81 European Cup Winners' Cup.

== Managerial career ==
Kirk managed Lisburn Distillery for 13 years. As one of the longest serving managers in the Irish League, he was surprisingly sacked at the beginning of the 2009–10 season after taking the club into Europe for the fourth time in six years. Paul also won the Ulster cup and two league winning promotions and was manager of the year on two occasions.

As manager of the Northern Ireland amateur league representative team Kirk won three consecutive Briton Rose bowls against Scotland.

A UEFA Pro licence coach, Kirk is the manager of Amateur League side Lisburn Rangers.

== Personal life ==
His son Andy Kirk is a retired footballer and former Northern Ireland international.

== Honours ==
Glentoran

- Irish League: 1969–70

Crusaders

- Irish League: 1975–76

Linfield F.C.

- Irish League: 1979–79

Waterford United

- FAI Cup: 1980
