= Joe Cardle =

English footballer (born 1987)

Personal information
- Full name: Joseph Cardle
- Date of birth: 7 February 1987 (age 39)
- Place of birth: Blackpool, England
- Height: 5 ft 8 in (1.73 m)
- Position: Midfielder

Youth career
- Lytham Juniors
- Burnley
- 2003–2005: Port Vale

Senior career*
Years	Team	Apps	(Gls)
2005–2008	Port Vale	22	(0)
2007	→ Clyde (loan)	7	(0)
2008–2009	Airdrie United	24	(1)
2009–2013	Dunfermline Athletic	118	(20)
2013–2014	Raith Rovers	40	(5)
2014–2015	Ross County	22	(0)
2015–2018	Dunfermline Athletic	77	(25)
2018	AFC Fylde	17	(2)
2019–2021	Partick Thistle	53	(9)
2021–2023	Kelty Hearts	72	(14)
Total		452	(76)
- * Club domestic league appearances and goals

Joseph Cardle (born 7 February 1987) is an English former professional footballer who played as a midfielder.

Starting his career at Port Vale in 2005, he made occasional appearances in his three years as a senior player at the club. Following a loan spell with Clyde in 2007, he signed with Scottish club Airdrie United in 2008, winning that year's Scottish Challenge Cup. The following year he moved on to Dunfermline Athletic and helped the club to the First Division title in 2010–11.

Cardle switched to Raith Rovers in March 2013 after Dunfermline Athletic hit a financial crisis. He helped Raith win the Scottish Challenge Cup in 2014 and won a move to top-flight club Ross County in May 2014. He rejoined Dunfermline Athletic in July 2015 and helped the club win the League One title in 2015–16. He signed with English non-League side AFC Fylde in July 2018 and then returned to Scotland to sign for Partick Thistle in January 2019. He won another League One title with Partick Thistle in 2020–21 before joining Kelty Hearts. He was named on the PFA Scotland Team of the Year for the second time after Hearts won the Scottish League Two title at the end of the 2021–22 season and left the club the following summer.

== Career ==
=== Port Vale ===
Born in Blackpool, Cardle played for Lytham Juniors in his youth alongside Joe Anyon. Both players signed as schoolboys for Burnley. In July 2003, 16-year-old Cardle signed for League One club Port Vale as an apprentice. Cardle made his senior debut on 10 September 2005 in a 2–0 defeat to Scunthorpe United. He made nine appearances in the 2005–06 campaign, and ten appearances in 2006–07. In May 2007, he signed a one-year extension to his contract.

In August 2007, Cardle signed on loan for Scottish First Division club Clyde until Christmas. He made his debut on 1 September against Dundee, but was sent off 25 minutes into the game. He made ten appearances in all competitions, the final one being against Montrose in the Scottish Cup in November 2007. He was taken off with an injury and failed to recover before his loan spell ended. Back at Vale Park, he played nine games in 2007–08.

=== Airdrie United ===
Cardle was released by new Vale manager Lee Sinnott in May 2008, and subsequently returned to Scotland to join Airdrie United. He played for Airdrie in the final of the Scottish Challenge Cup at McDiarmid Park, helping his new club to beat Ross County on penalties to claim their first trophy. He scored his first goal for the club in a league match against Queen of the South on 18 October 2008, and his second and final goal followed in the Scottish Cup against Cove Rangers the following month.

Cardle was red-carded in his final match for Airdrie, against Livingston on 7 March 2009, after an on-field incident with captain Marc Smyth. Cardle later said that "Big Marc got me mixed up with another Airdrie player who had lost possession which led to their [Livingston] fourth goal... Marc's verbal onslaught mistakenly directed at me, made me lose it". Cardle left the Excelsior Stadium by mutual consent four days later, having made a total of 24 appearances on the right side of midfield for the "Diamonds", scoring three goals in cup competitions along with one league goal.

=== Dunfermline Athletic ===
In May 2009, Cardle signed with Airdrie's First Division rivals Dunfermline Athletic. On 23 January 2010, Cardle scored a hat-trick in Dunfermline's 4–1 win at Partick Thistle, after coming on as a substitute. He scored eight goals in 31 games over all competitions in the 2009–10 campaign. In 2010–11, he helped Jim McIntyre's "Pars" to promotion into the Scottish Premier League as First Division champions. He also scored past Rangers at Ibrox in Dunfermline's 7–2 defeat in the League Cup. However, Athletic were relegated straight back out of the SPL in 2011–12, despite a late managerial change in putting Jim Jefferies in charge at East End Park. He was made redundant by Dunfermline in March 2013 after the club suffered a financial crisis.

=== Raith Rovers ===
On 31 March 2013, he joined Raith Rovers until the end of the season, after manager Grant Murray acted quickly to beat the player registration deadline. In July 2013, Cardle signed a new contract to stay at Stark's Park for another year. In February 2014, Cardle stated he had "fallen back in love with football" at Stark's Park. He played in the final of the Scottish Challenge Cup at Easter Road as Rovers beat Rangers 1–0 in extra time to claim his second winners medal in the competition.

=== Ross County ===
Cardle signed a one-year deal with Scottish Premiership club Ross County in May 2014 as manager Derek Adams felt that he was "an out and out winger... very creative and direct which will suit our style of play." He made his debut for Ross County on 10 August 2014, in a 2–1 home defeat against St Johnstone in the opening game of the season. At the end of the 2014–15 season, Cardle was released by the "Staggies".

=== Return to Dunfermline ===
After appearing and scoring for now League One side Dunfermline Athletic as a trialist against Berwick Rangers, Cardle re-signed for his former club in July 2015. On his return, Cardle's first competitive goal came in a 6–1 defeat of Brechin City in the first league match of the season. He scored a further 10 goals in 15 matches, including an important goal in the Scottish League Cup against Scottish Premiership side Dundee and a hat-trick against Forfar Athletic. In December 2015 however, he was sent off against title rivals Ayr United for receiving a straight red card for violent conduct, shortly after he received a yellow card for simulation. However, after appealing against referee Andrew Dallas' decision on the basis that there was no actual contact with Ayr player Peter Murphy, the card was rescinded. He helped the "Pars" to win promotion as divisional champions in the 2015–16 season. He was also named on the PFA Scotland Team of the Year for League One.

He scored a hat-trick in a 4–3 victory over Dumbarton at East End Park on 6 August 2016. Athletic finished in fifth-place in 2016–17, with Cardle claiming five goals in 21 games. Cardle was named as SPFL Championship Player of the Month in August 2017 after scoring five goals from four league games. He stated that "My confidence is high just now and I'm thriving on that. It can't get any higher, when you're scoring goals and making goals every week. It's fantastic – every day of life is amazing". However, soon after picking up the award he was sidelined for six weeks with a hamstring injury. He ended the 2017–18 campaign with ten goals in 34 appearances as Allan Johnston's Dunfermline qualified for the play-offs with a fourth-place finish, going to lose to Dundee United at the quarter-final stage. He left the club in June 2018.

=== AFC Fylde ===
After 10 years playing in Scotland, Cardle returned to England in July 2018, signing for National League club AFC Fylde on a two-year deal. He scored two goals in 17 appearances for the "Coasters", however, he left the club on 6 November; manager Dave Challinor said that this was because the player was unsettled after his wife and children were unable to relocate from Scotland.

=== Partick Thistle ===
On 4 January 2019, Cardle signed a deal with Partick Thistle to keep him at the Firhill Stadium until the end of the 2018–19 season after training with Gary Caldwell's side for some weeks. Cardle said that he was surprised to see the "Jags" struggling in the Scottish Championship and went on to say "I'm an experienced player and I know the division, so I know for certain that we have enough here to drag ourselves up the table". Cardle made his first appearance for Thistle in a 1–1 draw away to Dundee United, where he entered as a substitute, and scored his first goal in his third appearance; a 4–1 victory in the Scottish Cup against Stranraer. He scored his first league goal the following week in a 2–1 home win against Queen of the South. After helping the "Jags" to safety with a sixth-place finish, Cardle signed a new one-year deal with the Glasgow club in May 2019. He scored four goals in 32 games in the 2019–20 season, which ended in relegation when the season was declared early with nine games left to play due to the COVID-19 pandemic in Scotland. Cardle complained that Thistle were only two points behind Queen of the South with a game in hand, saying "the whole thing just doesn't feel right... Partick are too big a club to be relegated into League One and we believe we would have prevented it happening". He was offered a new contract in the summer.

Cardle signed a one-year contract extension with Thistle for the 2020–21 season. He scored his first and second goals season on 10 October, coming off the bench to score both goals in a 2–0 home win over Queen's Park in the League Cup group stages. Partick Thistle went on to win promotion as League One champions at the first attempt, with Cardle rounding off the scoring of the title-clinching 5–0 victory over Falkirk on 29 April.

=== Kelty Hearts ===
On 1 June 2021, Cardle signed a two-year contract with Kelty Hearts, who had just achieved promotion into Scottish League Two. On 31 July, he became the first player to score for Kelty Hearts in the Scottish Professional Football League, in a 2–0 win over Cowdenbeath at New Central Park. Kevin Thomson's Hearts won the division by a 21 points margin, with Cardle scoring 16 goals and providing 10 assists in 46 games. He was named on the PFA Scotland Team of the Year for League Two at the end of the 2021–22 season. He made forty appearances in the 2022–23 campaign, scoring two goals, as Hearts secured their third tier status with an eighth-place finish. He was not retained at the end of the season.

== Personal life ==
Cardle's parents were originally from Glasgow and moved to England before his birth. His brother, Scott, is a lightweight boxer. Cardle has indicated that he would want to represent Scotland over his country of birth. He has two daughters with his fiancée, Lucy-Anne Patterson. He owns UEFA B and A licences and set up a football academy in Dunfermline in 2020.

== Career statistics ==
Appearances and goals by club, season and competition
Club	Season	League			National cup (Note: Includes FA Cup, Scottish Cup)		League cup (Note: Includes Football League Cup, Scottish League Cup)		Other		Total	
Club	Season	Division	Apps	Goals	Apps	Goals	Apps	Goals	Apps	Goals	Apps	Goals
Port Vale	2005–06	League One	6	0	0	0	0	0	1 (Note: Appearance(s) in the Football League Trophy.)	0	7	0
Port Vale	2006–07	League One	7	0	1	0	1	0	1	0	10	0
Port Vale	2007–08	League One	9	0	0	0	0	0	0	0	9	0
Port Vale	Total		22	0	1	0	1	0	2	0	26	0
Clyde (loan)	2007–08	Scottish First Division	7	0	1	0	—		1 (Note: Appearance(s) in the Scottish Challenge Cup.)	0	9	0
Airdrie United	2008–09	Scottish First Division	24	1	3	1	3	0	3	0	33	2
Dunfermline Athletic	2009–10	Scottish First Division	25	5	3	2	1	0	2	1	31	8
Dunfermline Athletic	2010–11	Scottish First Division	32	4	1	0	2	1	0	0	35	5
Dunfermline Athletic	2011–12	Scottish Premier League	36	8	2	0	1	0	0	0	39	8
Dunfermline Athletic	2012–13	Scottish First Division	25	3	2	0	1	0	1	0	29	3
Dunfermline Athletic	Total		118	20	8	2	5	1	3	1	134	24
Raith Rovers	2012–13	Scottish First Division	7	0	—		—		—		7	0
Raith Rovers	2013–14	Scottish Championship	33	5	3	1	2	1	1	1	39	8
Raith Rovers	Total		40	5	3	1	2	1	1	1	46	8
Ross County	2014–15	Scottish Premiership	22	0	1	0	2	0	—		25	0
Dunfermline Athletic	2015–16	Scottish League One	29	14	3	0	3	1	3	0	38	15
Dunfermline Athletic	2016–17	Scottish Championship	23	4	2	1	4	0	3	0	32	5
Dunfermline Athletic	2017–18	Scottish Championship	25	7	2	0	5	3	2 (Note: 1 appearance in the Scottish Challenge Cup and 1 appearance in the play-offs.)	0	34	10
Dunfermline Athletic	Total		77	25	7	1	12	4	8	0	104	30
AFC Fylde	2018–19	National League	17	2	0	0	—		0	0	17	2
Partick Thistle	2018–19	Scottish Championship	11	2	3	1	0	0	0	0	14	3
Partick Thistle	2019–20	Scottish Championship	22	3	0	0	6	0	4	1	32	4
Partick Thistle	2020–21	Scottish League One	20	4	2	0	4	2	0	0	26	7
Partick Thistle	Total		53	9	5	1	10	2	4	1	72	13
Kelty Hearts	2021–22	Scottish League Two	36	12	5	3	4	1	1	0	46	16
Kelty Hearts	2022–23	Scottish League One	36	2	1	0	0	0	3	0	40	2
Kelty Hearts	Total		72	14	6	3	4	1	4	0	86	18
Career total			452	76	35	9	39	9	26	3	552	97

== Honours ==
=== Club ===
- Airdrie United
  - Scottish Challenge Cup: 2008
- Dunfermline Athletic
  - Scottish First Division: 2010–11
  - Scottish League One: 2015–16
- Raith Rovers
  - Scottish Challenge Cup: 2014
- Partick Thistle
  - Scottish League One: 2020–21
- Kelty Hearts
  - Scottish League Two: 2021–22

=== Individual ===
- Dunfermline Athletic
  - SPFL Championship Player of the Month: August 2017
  - PFA Scotland Team of the Year (Scottish League One): 2015–16
- Kelty Hearts
  - PFA Scotland Team of the Year (Scottish League Two): 2021–22
