= Alex Keddie =

Scottish footballer

Personal information
- Full name: Alexander Keddie
- Date of birth: 23 January 1981 (age 45)
- Place of birth: Glasgow, Scotland
- Height: 6 ft 2 in (1.88 m)
- Position: Defender

Youth career
- Leeds United

Senior career*
Years	Team	Apps	(Gls)
1998–1999	St Johnstone	0	(0)
1999–2001	Cumbernauld United		
2001–2005	Shotts Bon Accord		
2005–2006	Stranraer	35	(0)
2006–2010	Ross County	112	(5)
2010–2012	Dunfermline Athletic	61	(0)
2012–2014	Arbroath	65	(2)
- * Club domestic league appearances and goals as of 07:56, 9 May 2014 (UTC)

Alex Keddie is a Scottish former footballer who played as a defender. Keddie began his career with Leeds United and St Johnstone, before moving into Junior football with Cumbernauld United and Shotts Bon Accord. At the age of 24, Keddie returned to full-time football and played for Stranraer, Ross County, Dunfermline Athletic and Arbroath, before retiring in 2014.

== Career ==
He started his career in the youth team of Leeds United, where he won the FA Youth Cup, before having a short spell with Scottish Premier League side St Johnstone. After leaving St Johnstone, Keddie played Junior football with Cumbernauld United and Shotts Bon Accord.

After 6 years away from professional football, Keddie signed with Scottish First Division side Stranraer at the age of 24, before moving to Ross County after one season. Keddie spent 4 years with the Highland team, making 140 appearances in total and scoring 10 goals.

In May 2010, Keddie signed for Dunfermline Athletic. During his first season with the Pars, he won promotion to the SPL during the 2010–11 season, becoming a regular starter in the latter part of the season. After a fairly unimpressive second season with the side, which culminated in relegation and an immediate return to the First Division, he was released at the end of the 2011–12 season along with a number of other first team players including club captain, Austin McCann. Keddie made 36 top tier starts in central defence for the Pars, who conceded 82 goals during that season.

Keddie signed for Arbroath during the summer of 2012. After two seasons and over 70 appearances with the Red Lichties, Keddie left the club in May 2014.

== Personal life ==
Keddie holds an honours degree in Chartered Surveying from Glasgow Caledonian University, and after leaving full-time football in 2012, opened a barber shop in Glasgow with his sister.

== Honours ==
- Scottish Challenge Cup: 1

2006–07

- Scottish First Division: 1

Winner:2010–2011
