= Austin McCann =

Scottish footballer

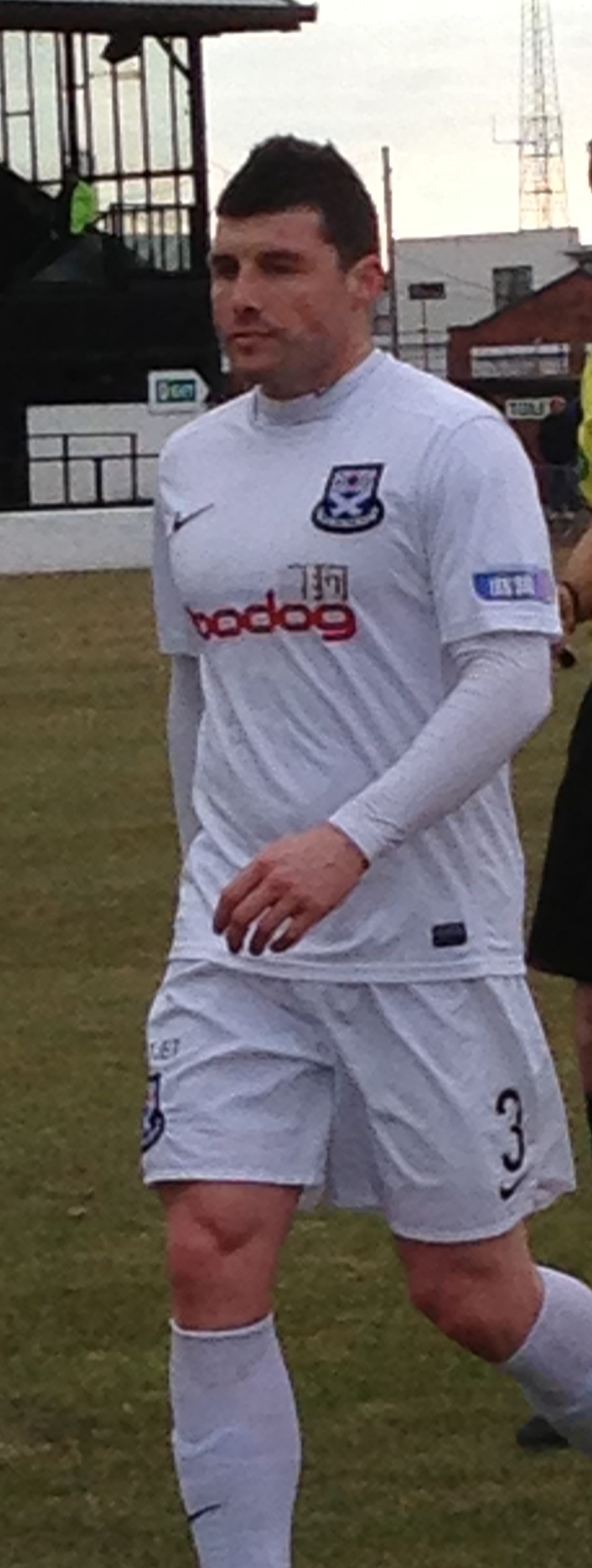
- McCann playing for Ayr United.

Personal information
- Full name: Henry Austin McCann
- Date of birth: 21 January 1980 (age 46)
- Place of birth: Clydebank, Scotland
- Position: Defender

Youth career
- Wolves Boys Cub

Senior career*
Years	Team	Apps	(Gls)
1997–2001	Airdrieonians	94	(7)
2001–2004	Hearts	39	(1)
2004	Clyde	6	(0)
2004–2006	Boston United	80	(1)
2006–2008	Notts County	65	(0)
2008–2012	Dunfermline Athletic	120	(1)
2012–2013	Ayr United	30	(0)
2013–2015	Clydebank	31	(2)
Total		465	(12)
- * Club domestic league appearances and goals

Austin McCann (born 21 January 1980) is a Scottish former footballer who played as a defender. During his career, McCann played in the Scottish Premier League for Heart of Midlothian as well as having spells in both the Scottish and English football leagues.

== Career ==
=== Scotland ===
McCann started his career with Wolves Boys Club in Glasgow and then became an apprentice with Scottish League First Division Airdrieonians in 1997. Primarily considered a left fullback, he has on occasion played as a wingback or even in left midfield. He spent 3 successful seasons with Airdrie, playing 97 times and scoring 9 goals while gaining a reputation as an exciting young talent. His form attracted the attention of Premier League side Heart of Midlothian, who were seeking a replacement for the recently sold Gary Naysmith, and he moved to the Edinburgh club in February 2001.

McCann struggled to maintain a regular place in the Hearts' side during his three seasons at Tynecastle, as firstly the veteran Stephane Mahé, then latterly converted right back Alan Maybury, were preferred in the left back berth by manager Craig Levein. Consequently, Austin appeared a mere 39 times for Hearts. However, his only competitive goal for the side was a memorable final minute 30-yard strike against Celtic in 2002–03, which secured a 2–1 home win against a side which reached the UEFA Cup Final that season.

=== England ===
McCann left Hearts in April 2004 in search of more regular first team football, initially signing a short-term deal with Clyde before agreeing to join Steve Evans' growing Scottish contingent at Boston United in the summer. McCann played 88 games in two seasons for the Pilgrims, scoring 1 goal against Cambridge United, before joining Notts County when his contract at York Street expired in the summer of 2006.

=== Return to Scotland ===
In February 2008, McCann signed a pre-contract deal with Scottish First Division side Dunfermline Athletic. He moved to the First Division side on 19 May 2008. He was appointed club captain, and in 2011, he won the first division championship. He scored his first and only goal for the club in a 1–0 win at Hibernian on 5 November 2011. He was released by the club after his contract expired at the end of the 2011/12 season.

McCann signed for Ayr United during the 2012 summer transfer window.

On 1 June 2013 he signed a contract with his hometown club Clydebank, where he played for two seasons before retiring from football.

== Honours ==
Airdrieonians

- Scottish Challenge Cup: 2000–01

Dunfermline Athletic

- Scottish First Division: 2010–11
