= Martin Hardie (footballer) =

Scottish footballer

Personal information
- Date of birth: 22 April 1976 (age 50)
- Place of birth: Alexandria, West Dunbartonshire, Scotland
- Position: Midfielder

Youth career
- Yoker Athletic

Senior career*
Years	Team	Apps	(Gls)
1996–1998	Queen's Park	28	(9)
1998–2000	East Stirlingshire	49	(4)
2000–2003	Partick Thistle	104	(29)
2003–2004	Kilmarnock	16	(1)
2004–2006	Airdrie United	47	(8)
2006–2011	St Johnstone	83	(21)
2010	→ Partick Thistle (loan)	4	(0)
2011–2012	Dunfermline Athletic	42	(9)
2012–2013	Greenock Morton	23	(9)
2013–2014	Airdrieonians	11	(2)
Total		407	(92)
- * Club domestic league appearances and goals

Martin Hardie (born 22 April 1976) is a Scottish football coach and former footballer.

Hardie started his career with Queen's Park in 1996, subsequently playing for eight different clubs, including two spells at Partick Thistle and also playing for both guises of Airdrieonians.

== Career ==
Upon joining St Johnstone, Hardie was suspended for the opening game of the 2006–07 season. He marked his debut for the club just three days later with a goal in a 3–1 win over East Fife in the League Cup. On 27 January 2007, Hardie scored late winner for second-placed St Johnstone against top-of-the-table Gretna at McDiarmid Park. The win closed the gap between the two teams to nine points, as Saints pushed Gretna to the last day in the championship race. Hardie was named Division One's Player of the Month for March 2007. Hardie also scored Saints' only goal in a 2–1 defeat against Celtic in a Scottish Cup semi final played in April 2007.

During a Scottish Cup semi final against Rangers in April 2008, a late challenge by Hardie damaged Steven Naismith's cruciate ligament. Hardie apologised to Naismith, who had been his teammate at Kilmarnock, for the tackle after the game.

Playing for Dunfermline Athletic, Hardie scored 8 goals for the side as they won the Scottish First Division in 2011. His appearances included a vital last minute goal against Ross County in a 1–0 win, and two goals to beat Raith Rovers 2–1 in a title deciding game. He opened his second season account with Dunfermline with a 30-yard top corner free-kick. It came in the last minute against Inverness Caledonian Thistle to gain a point and further demonstrated his prowess as a set piece specialist.

In July 2012, Hardie signed for Greenock Morton. He was released at the end of the season. On 18 July 2013 Martin Hardie signed for Airdrieonians on a 1-year contract however he left the club in January 2014, retiring from professional football.

Hardie was appointed manager of BSC Glasgow on 8 May 2021. in July 2021 he was relieved of his duties without having managed the team in a competitive game.

== Honours ==
Partick Thistle

- Scottish Football League Second Division: Winners 2000–01
- Scottish Football League First Division: Winners 2001–02

St Johnstone

- Scottish League Challenge Cup: Winners 2007–08
- Scottish Football League First Division: Winners 2008–09

Dunfermline Athletic

- Scottish Football League First Division: Winners 2010–11

Morton

- Scottish Football League First Division: Runners-Up 2012–13
