= Steven McDougall =

Scottish footballer (born 1986)

Personal information
- Full name: Steven David McDougall
- Date of birth: 17 June 1986 (age 40)
- Place of birth: Paisley, Scotland
- Positions: Winger; striker

Youth career
- 1994–2004: Rangers

Senior career*
Years	Team	Apps	(Gls)
2004–2009	Airdrie United	185	(15)
2009–2012	Dunfermline Athletic	69	(17)
2012–2014	Dumbarton	56	(7)
2015	Clyde	16	(2)
2015–	York Region Shooters		
- * Club domestic league appearances and goals as of 11:26, 31 May 2015 (UTC)

Steven McDougall (born 17 June 1986) is a Scottish professional footballer who plays for the York Region Shooters in the Canadian Soccer League.

== Career ==
McDougall started his career as a professional youth player at Rangers before moving on to Airdrie United aged 17. He was part of the Airdrie team that won the Scottish Second Division and the Scottish Challenge Cup.

On 4 July 2009, McDougall signed for Dunfermline on a two-year contract. He scored his first goal for the Pars against Partick Thistle on 14 November on his first start for the club. Having been signed from Airdrie as a wide player, McDougall gradually adjusted to the role of a striker during his first season at the Pars and went on to score 6 goals for the Pars during the 2009–10 campaign.

In 2011 Dunfermline and McDougall won promotion to the Scottish Premier League. Dunfermline defeated Greenock Morton 2–0 to clinch the title with McDougall opening the scoring. Dunfermline were relegated from the 2011–12 Scottish Premier League and McDougall signed for Dumbarton F.C .

McDougall signed for Dumbarton in June 2012. He signed a new contract for the 2013–14 season on 18 May, his third season with the club. In December 2014 Steven left the club after 65 appearances over 2 1/2 years. He joined Clyde in January 2015. McDougall made his debut for Clyde at Hampden Park in a 1-1. He scored his first goal in a 2–0 over Albion Rovers at Cliftonhill. At the end of the 2014–15 season, McDougall opted to leave Clyde FC in the summer 2015 to further progress his career internationally. In 2015, he went overseas to Canada to sign with the York Region Shooters of the Canadian Soccer League.

== Honours ==
Airdrie United

- Scottish Challenge Cup: (1), 2008–09
- Scottish Second Division
- Young Player of the Year

Dunfermline Athletic

- Scottish First Division: (1), 2010–11

== See also ==
- Dunfermline Athletic F.C. season 2009–10
