= David Graham (footballer, born 1983) =

Scottish footballer

Davie Graham
Personal information
- Full name: David Graham
- Date of birth: 2 June 1983 (age 43)
- Place of birth: Stirling, Scotland
- Height: 5 ft 8 in (1.73 m)
- Position: Winger

Team information
- Current team: East Belfast Fc

Senior career*
Years	Team	Apps	(Gls)
2001–2003	Stenhousemuir	53	(5)
2003–2005	Stranraer	52	(33)
2005–2007	Gretna	68	(6)
2007	→ Hamilton Academical (loan)	5	(1)
2007–2009	Hamilton Academical	36	(4)
2009–2012	Dunfermline Athletic	111	(12)
2012–2013	Greenock Morton	24	(2)
2016–	Rathfriland Rangers	0	(0)
- * Club domestic league appearances and goals as of 18:10, 26 April 2013 (UTC)

David Graham (born 2 June 1983) is a Scottish footballer who plays as a winger for Rathfriland Rangers in Division 1B of the Northern Amateur Football League.

== Career ==
During his youth career, Graham's former teams include Denny BC, Riverside and Gairdoch United. Graham spent his early career entirely in Scotland, mostly in leagues below the SPL. He started his career as a striker for Stenhousemuir in 2001, for whom he scored 5 goals in 53 league appearances. He moved to Stanraer where he was much more prolific, scoring 33 goals in 52 appearances – a strike rate better than a goal every other game. From there he went to ambitious Gretna but he did not do as well as he scored just 6 goals in his 68 matches. He then moved to Hamilton Academical on loan before making this move permanent in 2007.

After a successful season with the Accies, which saw him help the club win promotion to the Scottish Premier League, Graham was awarded a new two-year contract. In the January transfer window of 2009, Graham moved to Dunfermline Athletic. Graham signed for Greenock Morton in June 2012, and was released in April 2013.

In July 2013, Graham played and scored in a pre-season victory for Crusaders over Lisburn Rangers. In June 2016 Graham signed for Division 1B of the Northern Amateur Football League side Rathfriland Rangers in Northern Ireland.

== Honours ==
Stranraer

- Scottish Football League Second Division: 2003–04
- Scottish Football League Second Division: runners-up 2004–05

Gretna

- Scottish Football League Second Division: 2005–06
- Scottish Cup: runners-up 2005–06
- Scottish Football League First Division: 2006–07

Hamilton Academical

- Scottish Football League First Division: 2007–08

Dunfermline Athletic

- Scottish Football League First Division: 2010–11

Greenock Morton

- Scottish Football League First Division: runners-up 2012–13
