= Andy Kirk (footballer) =

Northern Irish football manager (born 1979)

Personal information
- Full name: Andrew Robert Kirk
- Date of birth: 29 May 1979 (age 47)
- Place of birth: Belfast, Northern Ireland
- Position: Forward

Team information
- Current team: Brechin City (manager)

Senior career*
Years	Team	Apps	(Gls)
1998–1999	Glentoran	75	(26)
1999–2004	Heart of Midlothian	114	(30)
2004–2005	Boston United	25	(18)
2005–2008	Northampton Town	106	(30)
2008	Yeovil Town	19	(4)
2008–2013	Dunfermline Athletic	146	(51)
2013–2014	Alloa Athletic	32	(5)
Total		517	(164)

International career
1990–2001	Northern Ireland U21	9	(2)
2003	Northern Ireland B	1	(0)
2000–2010	Northern Ireland	11	(0)

Managerial career
- 2016: Heart of Midlothian (joint interim manager)
- 2020–2021: Hearts Women
- 2021–2023: Brechin City
- 2024: St Johnstone (caretaker)
- 2026–: Brechin City
- * Club domestic league appearances and goals

Andrew Robert Kirk (born 29 May 1979) is a Northern Irish professional football coach and former player who is the manager of Brechin City.

Kirk played for Glentoran, Heart of Midlothian, Boston United, Northampton Town, Yeovil Town, Dunfermline Athletic and Alloa Athletic. He was also capped by Northern Ireland.

He began his managerial career with Hearts Women before joining Brechin City in 2021. Kirk left Brechin in November 2023 to assist Craig Levein at St Johnstone.

== Playing career ==
=== Club ===
==== Glentoran ====
Kirk started his career with Belfast side Glentoran and quickly established himself as one of the top strikers in the Irish League, scoring 26 league goals in the 1998–99 season.

Kirk enjoyed a successful time with the Glens and under manager Roy Coyle, winning the Gold Cup, County Antrim Shield and Irish Premiership title.

==== Heart of Midlothian ====
Having had several unsuccessful trials in England, Jim Jefferies signed Kirk for Heart of Midlothian for £50,000 in February 1999.

Initially viewed as an investment for the future, Kirk played in the club's U-21 side for most of his first two seasons at Tynecastle Stadium. However, in 2000–01 he firmly established himself in the first eleven, making 40 appearances and scoring 13 times. After a season decimated by injuries, he made further double-figure scoring contributions in 2002–03 and 2003–04. However, financial restraints at the Edinburgh club resulted in Kirk being released when his contract expired in the summer of 2004.

==== Boston United ====
Steve Evans signed Kirk for English League Two side Boston United. Kirk excelled at York Street, scoring 20 goals in little over 8 months.

==== Northampton Town ====
In March 2005 Kirk signed for Northampton Town for a £125,000 fee, signing a three-and-a-half-year contract.

Despite Kirk scoring on his debut, Northampton lost to Rushden & Diamonds and a stuttering finish to the season witnessed them fall in the play-off semi-finals. The following season, Kirk's 10 goals ensured there was no repeat and Northampton gained promotion to League One. During the 2006–07 season Kirk was transfer listed alongside fellow strikers James Quinn and Scott McGleish. However, Kirk was taken off the transfer list at the beginning of the 2007–08 season and rewarded manager Stuart Gray with 3 goals in the first 3 games.

==== Yeovil Town ====
Kirk moved to Yeovil Town on 17 January 2008 for an undisclosed fee. He signed a two-and-a-half-year contract. He scored twice in the first three games for his new club. In summer 2008 Yeovil rejected a bid from Morecambe for Kirk, though they went on to sell him to Scottish First Division team Dunfermline Athletic.

==== Dunfermline Athletic ====
In August 2008 Kirk signed a three-year contract. He made his debut as a substitute against First Division rivals Partick Thistle and scored his first two goals a week later against Queen of the South in a 2–1 win.

==== Alloa Athletic ====
In June 2013 Kirk signed with newly promoted First Division team Alloa Athletic having trained with the club in the latter part of the 2012/13 season after being released by Dunfermline due to the club being in administration.

=== International ===
Kirk was capped 11 times by Northern Ireland. His debut came against Hungary in April 2000. After a four-year absence he played against the Czech Republic in October 2009. His most final was in a friendly against Albania in 2010.

== Coaching career ==
Kirk joined Rangers Academy as a youth coach in March 2015. He returned to Edinburgh in February 2016 to coach Heart of Midlothian's U17 team. In December 2016, Kirk became joint interim manager with Jon Daly following Robbie Neilson's departure.

In August 2020, Kirk was appointed the First Team Manager and Girls' Academy Manager of Hearts Women.

=== Brechin City ===
In June 2021, Kirk was appointed the manager of Highland League side Brechin City. Brechin won the Highland League championship in 2022–23, but lost on penalties in the promotion playoffs to The Spartans.

=== St Johnstone ===
Kirk left Brechin in November 2023 to become assistant manager of Premiership club St Johnstone, working alongside Craig Levein.

=== Return to Brechin City ===
on 7 January 2026, Kirk returned to Brechin City.

== Personal life ==
Andy Kirk is the son of former footballer and former Lisburn Distillery manager Paul Kirk. Andy has two sons - Makenzie Kirk, a striker for Portsmouth, and Livingston B player Corey Kirk.

== Honours ==
Glentoran

- Irish Premier League: 1998–99
- Irish Cup: 1997–98
- Gold Cup: 1998–99
- County Antrim Shield: 1998–99

Dunfermline Athletic

- Scottish First Division: 2010–11

Individual

- SFL Player of the Month: August 2010
- SFL Ginger Boot: August 2010
