= 2010–11 Scottish First Division =

Irn-Bru Scottish First Division
- Season: 2010–11
- Champions: Dunfermline Athletic
- Promoted: Dunfermline Athletic
- Relegated: Cowdenbeath, Stirling Albion
- Biggest home win: Dunfermline Athletic 5–0 Cowdenbeath (29 December 2010); Partick Thistle 6–1 Stirling Albion (15 January 2011); Dunfermline Athletic 6-1 Queen of the South (16 April 2011)
- Biggest away win: Stirling Albion 0–5 Falkirk (13 November 2010)
- Highest scoring: Partick Thistle 6–1 Stirling Albion (15 January 2011); Stirling Albion 3–4 Cowdenbeath (5 March 2011); Dunfermline Athletic 6-1 Queen of the South (16 April 2011)
- Highest attendance: 11,052: Dunfermline Athletic 2–1 Raith Rovers (23 April 2011)
- Lowest attendance: 266: Queen of the South 0–1 Ross County (26 February 2011)

The 2010–11 Scottish First Division was the 17th season of the First Division in its current format of ten teams. Dunfermline Athletic finished champions, with Cowdenbeath and Stirling Albion being relegated.

== Promotion and relegation from 2009–10 ==
=== SPL & First Division ===
Relegated from Premier League to First Division

- Falkirk

Promoted from First Division to Scottish Premier League

- Inverness Caledonian Thistle

=== First & Second Divisions ===
Relegated from First Division to Second Division

- Ayr United
- Airdrie United (via play-offs)

Promoted from Second Division to First Division

- Stirling Albion
- Cowdenbeath (via play-offs)

== League table ==
Pos	Team	Pld	W	D	L	GF	GA	GD	Pts	Promotion, qualification or relegation
1	Dunfermline Athletic (C, P)	36	20	10	6	66	31	+35	70	Promotion to the Premier League
2	Raith Rovers	36	17	9	10	47	35	+12	60	
3	Falkirk	36	17	7	12	57	41	+16	58	
4	Queen of the South	36	14	7	15	54	53	+1	49	
5	Partick Thistle	36	12	11	13	44	39	+5	47	
6	Dundee	36	19	12	5	54	34	+20	44 (Note: Dundee were docked 25 points for entering administration. The deduction was temporarily lifted pending an appeal by the club, however the appeal failed and the deduction was reinstated.)	
7	Greenock Morton	36	11	10	15	39	43	−4	43	
8	Ross County	36	9	14	13	30	34	−4	41	
9	Cowdenbeath (R)	36	9	8	19	41	72	−31	35	Qualification for the First Division play-offs
10	Stirling Albion (R)	36	4	8	24	32	82	−50	20	Relegation to the Second Division

Source: SPFL
Rules for classification: 1) points; 2) goal difference; 3) number of goals scored.
(C) Champions; (P) Promoted; (R) Relegated

== Results ==
Teams play each other four times in this league. In the first half of the season each team plays every other team twice (home and away) and then do the same in the second half of the season, for a total of 36 games

=== First half of season ===
Home \ Away	COW	DND	DNF	FAL	GMO	PAR	QOS	RAI	ROS	STI
Cowdenbeath		2–1	0–4	0–0	2–2	2–1	1–3	1–2	0–2	5–1
Dundee	3–0		2–2	2–0	2–1	2–1	1–0	0–0	0–0	2–0
Dunfermline Athletic	2–1	3–1		1–1	2–0	0–0	1–0	2–2	3–2	3–0
Falkirk	5–1	3–3	0–1		2–1	2–0	3–1	0–0	0–1	3–0
Greenock Morton	1–2	0–1	2–1	0–0		2–0	2–0	0–1	0–0	0–0
Partick Thistle	1–0	1–0	0–2	1–0	0–0		3–1	0–0	1–1	1–2
Queen of the South	3–0	1–2	2–0	1–5	2–0	2–1		1–3	3–0	2–2
Raith Rovers	2–1	1–2	2–0	2–1	1–0	4–0	0–1		1–0	0–2
Ross County	1–1	0–3	0–0	0–1	2–2	0–2	1–1	0–0		3–1
Stirling Albion	1–3	1–1	1–5	0–5	0–1	4–2	0–0	1–3	0–0	

Updated to match(es) played on 19 April. Source: BBC Sport
Legend: Blue = home team win; Yellow = draw; Red = away team win.

=== Second half of season ===
Home \ Away	COW	DND	DNF	FAL	GMO	PAR	QOS	RAI	ROS	STI
Cowdenbeath		1–3	0–1	1–2	0–2	1–1	2–2	0–3	2–1	1–0
Dundee	2–2		1–1	1–0	1–1	3–2	2–1	2–1	2–0	1–1
Dunfermline Athletic	5–0	0–0		3–0	1–3	0–0	6–1	2–1	1–1	4–1
Falkirk	2–0	2–2	1–2		1–0	2–3	0–3	2–1	0–1	4–2
Greenock Morton	3–0	1–3	0–2	2–2		1–0	0–4	0–0	2–1	2–0
Partick Thistle	0–1	0–0	2–0	1–2	2–0		0–0	3–0	1–1	6–1
Queen of the South	2–2	3–0	1–3	0–1	1–4	3–3		0–2	0–1	4–1
Raith Rovers	2–2	2–1	2–1	1–2	2–2	0–2	0–1		1–1	2–1
Ross County	3–0	0–1	0–1	2–1	2–0	0–0	1–2	0–1		0–0
Stirling Albion	3–4	0–1	1–1	1–2	3–2	0–3	0–2	1–2	0–2	

Updated to match(es) played on 7 May 2011. Source:
Legend: Blue = home team win; Yellow = draw; Red = away team win.

=== Top goalscorers ===
15 goals

- (Scotland) Kris Doolan (Partick Thistle)
- (Scotland) Mark Stewart (Falkirk)

13 goals

- (Scotland) John Baird (Raith Rovers)
- (Northern Ireland) Andy Kirk (Dunfermline Athletic)

12 goals

- (Scotland) Colin McMenamin (Queen of the South)

11 goals

- (Scotland) Gordon Smith (Stirling Albion)

9 goals

- (Scotland) Pat Clarke (Dunfermline Athletic)
- (Scotland) Martin Hardie (Dunfermline Athletic)
- (Scotland) Sean Higgins (Dundee)
- (Scotland) Allan Jenkins (Greenock Morton)
- (Scotland) Willie McLaren (Queen of the South)
- (Scotland) Greg Stewart (Cowdenbeath)

== First Division play-offs ==
Times are BST (UTC+1)

=== Semi-finals ===
The fourth placed team in the Second Division (Brechin City) will play the ninth placed team in the First Division (Cowdenbeath) and third placed team in the Second Division (Forfar Athletic) will play the second placed team in the Second Division (Ayr United). The play-offs will be played over two legs on Wednesday 11 May 2011 & Saturday 14 May 2011, the winning team in each semi-final will advance to the final on Wednesday 18 May 2011 & Sunday 22 May 2011.

Team 1	Agg.	Team 2	1st leg	2nd leg
Brechin City	4 – 2	Cowdenbeath	2–2	2–0
Forfar Athletic	4 – 7	Ayr United	1–4	3–3

First legs

11 May 2011
7:45pm

Brechin City	2 – 2	Cowdenbeath
Kirkpatrick 46'; Megginson 51'	BBC Sport	Linton 4'; Coult 26'

Glebe Park
Attendance: 596
Referee: Anthony Law

11 May 2011
7:45pm

Forfar Athletic	1 – 4	Ayr United
Templeman 10'	BBC Sport	Moffat 2'; Bishop , 35' (o.g.); McCann 52'; Rodgers 87'

Station Park
Attendance: 924
Referee: John McKendrick

Second legs

14 May 2011
2:00pm

Cowdenbeath	0 – 2	Brechin City
	BBC Sport	Redman 78'; Molloy 84'

Central Park
Attendance: 645
Referee: David Somers

14 May 2011
3:00pm

Ayr United	3 – 3	Forfar Athletic
Moffat 12'; McLaughlin 48'; Trouten 90' (pen.)	BBC Sport	Hilson 31'; Sellars 56'; Campbell 90' (pen.)

Somerset Park
Attendance: 1,198
Referee: Brian Winter

=== Final ===
The two semi-final winners will play each other over two legs. The winning team will be awarded a place in the 2011–12 First Division.

Team 1	Agg.	Team 2	1st leg	2nd leg
Ayr United	3 – 2	Brechin City	1–1	2–1

First leg

18 May 2011
7:45pm

Ayr United	1 – 1	Brechin City
Moffat 31'	BBC Sport	Janczyk 86'

Somerset Park
Attendance: 2,020
Referee: Steve Conroy

Second leg

22 May 2011
3:00pm

Brechin City	1 – 2	Ayr United
Tiffoney 44' (o.g.)	BBC Sport	Roberts 76'; Moffat 88'

Glebe Park
Attendance: 2,404
Referee: Crawford Allan

== Kits and shirt sponsors ==
Team	Kit manufacturer	Kit sponsor	Notes
Cowdenbeath	Erreà	Lints Property	New home and away kits.
Dundee	Puma	Kilmac Energy	New home and away kits.
Dunfermline Athletic	Puma	The Purvis Group	New home and away kits.
Falkirk	Puma	Central Demolition	New home and away kits.
Greenock Morton	Puma	Millions Chews (Home) Buchanan's Toffees (Away)	New home and away kits
Partick Thistle	Puma	Ignis asset management	New home kit
Queen of the South	Joma	Palmerston Furniture Centre	New home and away kits.
Raith Rovers	Puma	O'Connell's Bar and Diner	New home and away kits.
Ross County	Nike	Highnet	New home and away kits
Stirling Albion	Puma	Prudential Insurance	New home and away kits.

== Stadia ==
Team	Stadium	Capacity
Dunfermline Athletic	East End Park	12,509
Dundee	Dens Park	12,085
Greenock Morton	Cappielow	11,612
Partick Thistle	Firhill Stadium	10,887
Raith Rovers	Stark's Park	10,104
Falkirk	Falkirk Stadium	9,120
Queen of the South	Palmerston Park	6,412
Ross County	Victoria Park	6,310
Cowdenbeath	Central Park	4,370
Stirling Albion	Forthbank Stadium	3,808

== See also ==
- Scottish football referee strike
