= 2011–12 Scottish Premier League =

106th season of top-tier football league in Scotland

Scottish Premier League
- Season: 2011–12
- Dates: 23 July 2011 – 13 May 2012
- Champions: Celtic; 7th Premier League title 43rd Scottish title
- Relegated: Dunfermline Athletic; Rangers (to third division)
- Champions League: Celtic; Motherwell
- Europa League: Hearts; Dundee United; St Johnstone
- Matches: 228
- Goals: 601 (2.64 per match)
- Top goalscorer: Gary Hooper (24)
- Biggest home win: Celtic 5–0 St Mirren (26 November 2011); Rangers 5–0 Dundee United (2 May 2012); Celtic 5–0 Hearts (13 May 2012)
- Biggest away win: Kilmarnock 0–6 Celtic (7 April 2012)
- Highest scoring: Kilmarnock 3–6 Inverness CT (5 November 2011)
- Longest winning run: 17 games Celtic
- Longest unbeaten run: 21 games Celtic
- Longest winless run: 11 games St Mirren
- Longest losing run: 5 games Dunfermline Athletic
- Highest attendance: 58,875; Celtic v Hearts (13 May 2012)
- Lowest attendance: 1,607; St Johnstone v Aberdeen (13 December 2011)
- Average attendance: 13,861

The 2011–12 Scottish Premier League was the fourteenth season of the Scottish Premier League, the highest division of Scottish football, since its inception in 1998. The season started on 23 July 2011 and ended on 13 May 2012.

A total of twelve teams contested the league: eleven sides that competed in the 2010–11 SPL and one club promoted from the First Division. The new entry was First Division champions Dunfermline Athletic, who replaced relegated Hamilton Academical.

Since Scotland climbed from sixteenth to fifteenth place in the UEFA association coefficient rankings at the end of the 2010–11 season, the league re-gained an additional third qualifying round berth for the UEFA Champions League. However, it lost that berth again the following season. Despite finishing in the second qualifying position for the 2012–13 UEFA Champions League, the eventual liquidation of the company which owned Rangers allowed Motherwell to take their place in the competition for the first time in the club's history.

On 7 April, Celtic won the title after a 6–0 away win against Kilmarnock at Rugby Park. It was their first title in four years.

== Teams ==
Location of teams in Scottish Premier League 2011–12

The team ending the 2010–11 season at the bottom of the table, Hamilton Academical, were relegated to the 2011–12 Scottish First Division. Hamilton were replaced by Dunfermline Athletic, champions of the First Division.

=== Stadia and locations ===
Team	Stadium	Capacity
Aberdeen	Pittodrie Stadium, Aberdeen	22,199
Celtic	Celtic Park, Glasgow	60,355
Dundee United	Tannadice Park, Dundee	14,209
Dunfermline Athletic	East End Park, Dunfermline	12,509
Heart of Midlothian	Tynecastle Stadium, Edinburgh	17,420
Hibernian	Easter Road, Edinburgh	20,421
Inverness Caledonian Thistle	Caledonian Stadium, Inverness	7,918
Kilmarnock	Rugby Park, Kilmarnock	18,128
Motherwell	Fir Park, Motherwell	13,742
Rangers	Ibrox Stadium, Glasgow	51,082
St Johnstone	McDiarmid Park, Perth	10,673
St Mirren	St Mirren Park, Paisley	8,016

=== Personnel and kits ===
Note: Flags indicate national team as has been defined under FIFA eligibility rules. Players may hold more than one non-FIFA nationality.

Team	Manager	Captain	Kit manufacturer	Shirt sponsor
Aberdeen	Craig Brown	Russell Anderson	adidas	Team Recruitment
Celtic	Neil Lennon	Scott Brown	Nike	Tennents
Dundee United	Peter Houston	Jon Daly	Nike	Calor
Dunfermline	Jim Jefferies	Austin McCann	Puma	The Purvis Group
Hearts	Paulo Sergio	Marius Zaliukas	Umbro	Wonga.com
Hibernian	Pat Fenlon	Ian Murray	Puma	Crabbie's
Inverness CT	Terry Butcher	Richie Foran	Erreà	Orion Group
Kilmarnock	Kenny Shiels	Manuel Pascali	Killie 1869	verve.net
Motherwell	Stuart McCall	Stephen Craigan	Puma	Cash Converters
Rangers	Ally McCoist	Steven Davis	Umbro	Tennents
St Johnstone	Steve Lomas	Jody Morris	Joma	GS Brown Construction
St Mirren	Danny Lennon	Jim Goodwin	diadora	diadora

=== Managerial changes ===
Team	Outgoing manager	Manner of departure	Date of vacancy	Position in table	Incoming manager	Date of appointment
Rangers	Walter Smith	End of contract	15 May 2011	Pre-season	Ally McCoist	1 June 2011
Heart of Midlothian	Jim Jefferies	Contract terminated	2 August 2011	9th	Paulo Sergio	3 August 2011
St Johnstone	Derek McInnes	Signed by Bristol City	19 October 2011	4th	Steve Lomas	3 November 2011
Hibernian	Colin Calderwood	Contract terminated	6 November 2011	9th	Pat Fenlon	25 November 2011
Dunfermline	Jim McIntyre	Contract terminated	16 March 2012	12th	Jim Jefferies	20 March 2012

== League table ==
Pos	Team	Pld	W	D	L	GF	GA	GD	Pts	Qualification or relegation
1	Celtic (C)	38	30	3	5	84	21	+63	93	Qualification for the Champions League third qualifying round
2	Rangers (D, R)	38	26	5	7	77	28	+49	73	Refused SPL admission, accepted into the Third Division and disqualified from the Champions League third qualifying round (Note: Rangers were deducted 10 points for entering administration. As Rangers did not exit administration by 31 March, they were ineligible to compete in Europe in the 2012–13 season. Rangers were unable to agree a CVA with their creditors and the company entered proceedings to be liquidated. After a new company took over, Rangers were denied continued SPL membership and ended up in the 2012–13 Scottish Third Division in time for the start of the season.)
3	Motherwell	38	18	8	12	49	44	+5	62	Qualification for the Champions League third qualifying round
4	Dundee United	38	16	11	11	62	50	+12	59	Qualification for the Europa League third qualifying round
5	Heart of Midlothian	38	15	7	16	45	43	+2	52	Qualification for the Europa League play-off round (Note: Hearts qualified for the Europa League as 2011–12 Scottish Cup winners. Since they finished fifth in the league, the sixth-placed team, St Johnstone, also qualified for the Europa League.)
6	St Johnstone	38	14	8	16	43	50	−7	50	Qualification for the Europa League second qualifying round
7	Kilmarnock	38	11	14	13	44	61	−17	47	
8	St Mirren	38	9	16	13	39	51	−12	43	
9	Aberdeen	38	9	14	15	36	44	−8	41	
10	Inverness Caledonian Thistle	38	10	9	19	42	60	−18	39	
11	Hibernian	38	8	9	21	40	67	−27	33	
12	Dunfermline Athletic (R)	38	5	10	23	40	82	−42	25	Relegation to the First Division

Source: SPFL Archive
Rules for classification: 1) points; 2) goal difference; 3) number of goals scored.
(C) Champions; (D) Disqualified; (R) Relegated

== Results ==
=== Matches 1–22 ===
Teams play each other twice, once at home, once away

Home \ Away	ABE	CEL	DUN	DNF	HOM	HIB	INV	KIL	MOT	RAN	STJ	STM
Aberdeen		0–1	3–1	4–0	0–0	1–0	2–1	2–2	1–2	1–2	0–0	2–2
Celtic	2–1		5–1	2–1	1–0	0–0	2–0	2–1	4–0	1–0	0–1	5–0
Dundee United	1–2	0–1		0–1	1–0	3–1	3–1	1–1	1–3	0–1	0–0	1–1
Dunfermline Athletic	3–3	0–3	1–4		0–2	2–2	3–3	1–1	2–4	0–4	0–3	0–0
Heart of Midlothian	3–0	2–0	0–1	4–0		2–0	2–1	0–1	2–0	0–2	1–2	2–0
Hibernian	0–0	0–2	3–3	0–1	1–3		1–1	1–1	0–1	0–2	3–2	1–2
Inverness Caledonian Thistle	2–1	0–2	2–3	1–1	1–1	0–1		2–1	2–3	0–2	0–1	2–1
Kilmarnock	2–0	3–3	1–1	3–2	0–0	4–1	3–6		0–0	1–0	1–2	2–1
Motherwell	1–0	1–2	0–0	3–1	1–0	4–3	3–0	0–0		0–3	0–3	1–1
Rangers	2–0	4–2	3–1	2–1	1–1	1–0	2–1	2–0	3–0		0–0	1–1
St Johnstone	1–2	0–2	3–3	0–1	2–0	3–1	2–0	2–0	0–3	0–2		0–1
St Mirren	1–0	0–2	2–2	2–1	0–0	2–3	1–2	3–0	0–1	2–1	0–0	

Source: BBC website
Legend: Blue = home team win; Yellow = draw; Red = away team win.

=== Matches 23–33 ===
Teams play every other team once (either at home or away)

Home \ Away	ABE	CEL	DUN	DNF	HOM	HIB	INV	KIL	MOT	RAN	STJ	STM
Aberdeen		1–1	3–1	1–0			0–1	0–0			0–0	
Celtic			2–1	2–0			1–0		1–0		2–0	
Dundee United				3–0			3–0	4–0	1–1	2–1		0–0
Dunfermline Athletic					1–2	2–3	1–1		0–2	1–4		1–1
Heart of Midlothian	3–0	0–4	0–2			2–0						5–2
Hibernian	0–0	0–5	0–2						1–1		2–3	0–0
Inverness Caledonian Thistle					1–0	2–3		1–1		1–4		0–0
Kilmarnock		0–6		0–3	1–1	1–3			2–0		0–0	
Motherwell	1–0				3–0		0–1			1–2	3–2	
Rangers	1–1	3–2			1–2	4–0		0–1				3–1
St Johnstone			1–5	3–1	2–1		0–0			1–2		
St Mirren	1–1	0–2						4–2	0–0		0–3	

Source: BBC Sport
Legend: Blue = home team win; Yellow = draw; Red = away team win.

=== Matches 34–38 ===
After 33 matches, the league splits into two sections of six teams each, with teams playing every other team in their section once (either at home or away). The exact matches are determined upon the league table at the time of the split.

==== Top six ====
Home \ Away	CEL	DUN	HOM	MOT	RAN	STJ
Celtic			5–0		3–0	1–0
Dundee United	1–0		2–2			
Heart of Midlothian				0–1	0–3	2–0
Motherwell	0–3	0–2				5–1
Rangers		5–0		0–0		
St Johnstone		0–2			0–4	

Source: BBC Sport
Legend: Blue = home team win; Yellow = draw; Red = away team win.

==== Bottom six ====
Home \ Away	ABE	DNF	HIB	INV	KIL	STM
Aberdeen			1–2			0–0
Dunfermline Athletic	3–0				1–2	
Hibernian		4–0			0–1	
Inverness Caledonian Thistle	0–2	0–0	2–0			
Kilmarnock	1–1			4–3		0–2
St Mirren		4–4	1–0	0–1		

Source: BBC Sport
Legend: Blue = home team win; Yellow = draw; Red = away team win.

== Season statistics ==
=== Top scorers ===
As of 31 May 2012

Rank	Scorer	Team	Goals
1	(England) Gary Hooper	Celtic	24
2	(Republic of Ireland) Jon Daly	Dundee United	19
3	(England) Michael Higdon	Motherwell	14
3	(Croatia) Nikica Jelavić	Rangers	14
3	(Spain) Francisco Sandaza	St Johnstone	14
6	(Scotland) Steven Thompson	St Mirren	13
7	(Scotland) Garry O'Connor	Hibernian	12
7	(Northern Ireland) Dean Shiels	Kilmarnock	12
7	(Czech Republic) Rudolf Skácel	Hearts	12
7	(Republic of Ireland) Anthony Stokes	Celtic	12
7	(Nigeria) Sone Aluko	Rangers	12

=== Clean sheets ===
As of 31 May 2012

Rank	Player	Team	Clean sheets
1	(England) Fraser Forster	Celtic	21
2	(Scotland) Allan McGregor	Rangers	17
3	(Republic of Ireland) Darren Randolph	Motherwell	15
4	(Slovakia) Dušan Perniš	Dundee United	13
4	(Scotland) Craig Samson	St Mirren	13
6	(Finland) Peter Enckelman	St Johnstone	10
7	(Scotland) Cameron Bell	Kilmarnock	9
8	(Slovakia) Marián Kello	Hearts	8
9	(Wales) Jason Brown	Aberdeen	6
9	(Scotland) Ryan Esson	Inverness CT	6

== Awards ==
=== Monthly awards ===
As of 31 May 2012

Month	Manager	Player	Young Player
July/August	(Scotland) Stuart McCall (Motherwell)	(Scotland) Paul Gallacher (Dunfermline Athletic)	(Scotland) Johnny Russell (Dundee United)
September	(Scotland) Ally McCoist (Rangers)	(Northern Ireland) Steven Davis (Rangers)	(Scotland) James Forrest (Celtic)
October	(Scotland) Stuart McCall (Motherwell)	(Scotland) Keith Lasley (Motherwell)	(Scotland) Kenny McLean (St Mirren)
November	(Northern Ireland) Neil Lennon (Celtic)	(England) Gary Hooper (Celtic)	(Scotland) James Forrest (Celtic)
December	(Northern Ireland) Neil Lennon (Celtic)	(Scotland) Paul McGowan (St Mirren)	(Kenya) Victor Wanyama (Celtic)
January	(Scotland) Craig Brown (Aberdeen)	(Scotland) Scott Brown (Celtic)	(Estonia) Henrik Ojamaa (Motherwell)
February	(Northern Ireland) Neil Lennon (Celtic)	(Scotland) Charlie Mulgrew (Celtic)	(Scotland) Gary Mackay-Steven (Dundee United)
March	(Scotland) Peter Houston (Dundee United)	(Republic of Ireland) Jon Daly (Dundee United)	(Scotland) Gary Mackay-Steven (Dundee United)
April	(Northern Ireland) Neil Lennon (Celtic)	(Scotland) Charlie Mulgrew (Celtic)	(England) Shaun Hutchinson (Motherwell)

=== Annual awards ===
Award	Winner	Club
Player of the Season	(Scotland) Charlie Mulgrew	(Scotland) Celtic
Young Player of the Season	(Scotland) James Forrest	(Scotland) Celtic
Manager of the Season	(Northern Ireland) Neil Lennon	(Scotland) Celtic
Goal of the Season	(England) James Dayton	(Scotland) Kilmarnock
Save of the Season	(Scotland) Allan McGregor	(Scotland) Rangers
Under-19 League Player of the Season	(Northern Ireland) Paul George	(Scotland) Celtic

PFA Scotland Team of the Year
Goalkeeper	(Republic of Ireland) Darren Randolph (Motherwell)			
Defence	(Wales) Adam Matthews (Celtic)	(Republic of Ireland) Gavin Gunning (Dundee United)	(Scotland) Charlie Mulgrew (Celtic)	(Scotland) Paul Dixon (Dundee United)
Midfield	(Scotland) James Forrest (Celtic)		(Northern Ireland) Steven Davis (Rangers)	(Scotland) Gary Mackay-Steven (Dundee United)
Forwards	(Scotland) Johnny Russell (Dundee United)		(Republic of Ireland) Jon Daly (Dundee United)	(England) Gary Hooper (Celtic)

== Attendances ==
#	Football club	Average attendance
1	Celtic	50,904
2	Rangers	46,362
3	Heart of Midlothian	13,381
4	Hibernian	9,909
5	Aberdeen	9,297
6	Dundee United	7,482
7	Motherwell	5,951
8	Kilmarnock	5,537
9	Dunfermline Athletic	4,799
10	St. Mirren	4,493
11	St. Johnstone	4,170
12	Inverness Caledonian Thistle	4,023

== See also ==
- 2011–12 in Scottish football
- Nine in a row
