= 2003–04 Dunfermline Athletic F.C. season =

Dunfermline Athletic
2003–04 season
- Manager: Jimmy Calderwood
- Stadium: East End Park
- Scottish Premier League: Fourth place
- Scottish Cup: Runners-up
- Scottish League Cup: Third round
- Top goalscorer: League: Stevie Crawford (13); All: Stevie Crawford (17)

The 2003–04 season saw Dunfermline Athletic compete in the Scottish Premier League where they finished in 4th position with 53 points. They also reached the 2004 Scottish Cup Final where they lost 3–1 to Celtic.

== Results ==
Win	Draw	Loss

=== Scottish Premier League ===
Match	Date	Opponent	Venue	Result	Attendance	Scorers
1	9 August 2003	Celtic	H	0–0	10,082	
2	17 August 2003	Dundee	A	2–0	7,750	Wilkie 45' (o.g.), Crawford 88'
3	23 August 2003	Aberdeen	A	2–1	10,870	Brewster 30', Nicholson 56'
4	31 August 2003	Heart of Midlothian	A	0–1	11,934	
5	13 September 2003	Rangers	A	0–4	49,072	
6	20 September 2003	Hibernian	H	0–0	9,715	
7	27 September 2003	Partick Thistle	H	2–1	4,684	Crawford (2) 56', 70'
8	4 October 2003	Livingston	A	0–0	4,616	
9	4 October 2003	Kilmarnock	H	2–3	4,495	Crawford (2) 28', 55'
10	1 November 2003	Dundee United	H	2–0	5,078	Thomson 59', Mehmet 90'
11	8 November 2003	Celtic	A	0–5	58,328	
12	22 November 2003	Dundee	H	2–0	5,490	Crawford (2) 52', 64'
13	25 November 2003	Motherwell	A	2–2	4,220	Crawford 15', Brewster 39'
14	29 November 2003	Aberdeen	H	2–2	5,294	Young 61', Bullen 74'
15	6 December 2003	Heart of Midlothian	H	2–1	6,199	Young 21', Wilson 62'
16	14 December 2003	Rangers	H	2–0	8,592	Crawford 5', Vanoli 85' (o.g.)
17	21 December 2003	Hibernian	A	2–1	9,085	Brewster (2) 1', 36'
18	27 December 2003	Partick Thistle	A	1–4	4,377	Brewster 59'
19	3 January 2004	Livingston	H	2–2	5,155	Nicholson 36', Crawford 80'
20	17 January 2004	Kilmarnock	A	1–1	5,715	Crawford 63'
21	24 January 2004	Motherwell	H	1–0	5,270	Young 73'
22	31 January 2004	Dundee United	A	0–1	5,564	
23	11 February 2004	Celtic	H	1–4	11,201	Hunt 20'
24	14 February 2004	Dundee	A	1–0	5,643	Hunt 32'
25	21 February 2004	Aberdeen	A	0–2	11,035	
26	28 February 2004	Heart of Midlothian	H	0–0	8,421	
27	20 March 2004	Partick Thistle	H	1–0	4,349	Young 9'
28	23 March 2004	Rangers	A	1–4	47,487	Tod 21'
29	27 March 2004	Livingston	A	0–0	3,558	
30	3 April 2004	Kilmarnock	H	2–1	3,914	Nicholson 40', Crawford 70'
31	13 April 2004	Hibernian	H	1–1	5,041	Dempsey 78'
32	15 April 2004	Motherwell	A	0–1	3,920	
33	17 April 2004	Dundee United	H	1–1	4,409	Shields 45'
34	24 April 2004	Motherwell	H	3–0	4,290	Nicholson 36', Dempsey 52', Young 74'
35	2 May 2004	Celtic	A	2–1	59,739	Nicholson 28', Dempsey 59'
36	8 May 2004	Heart of Midlothian	A	1–2	10,846	Tod 11'
37	11 May 2004	Dundee United	A	2–3	5,998	Bullen 34', Crawford 46'
38	16 May 2004	Rangers	H	2–3	6,798	Dempsey (2) 27', 66'

=== Scottish League Cup ===
Match	Date	Opponent	Venue	Result	Attendance	Scorers
Second round	24 September 2003	Cowdenbeath	H	2–0	3,582	Crawford 54', Brewster 64'
Third round	28 October 2003	St Johnstone	A	2–3	2,769	Crawford 80', Young 83'

=== Scottish Cup ===
Match	Date	Opponent	Venue	Result	Attendance	Scorers
Third round	10 January 2004	Dundee United	H	3–1	6,164	Crawford (2) 16', 36', Brewster 49'
Fourth round	24 February 2004	Clyde	A	3–0	2,441	Nicholson (2) 19', 38', Bullen 41'
Quarter-finals	6 March 2004	Partick Thistle	A	3–0	5,335	Byrne 11', Nicholson 36', Brewster 69'
Semi-finals	10 March 2004	Inverness Caledonian Thistle	N	1–1	13,255	Brewster 37'
Semi-final replay	20 April 2004	Inverness Caledonian Thistle	N	3–2	5,728	Young 25', Brewster 63', Nicholson 78'
Final	22 May 2004	Celtic	N	1–3	50,846	Skerla 40'

== Squad ==
Note: Flags indicate national team as defined under FIFA eligibility rules; some limited exceptions apply. Players may hold more than one non-FIFA nationality.

No.	Pos.	Nation	Player
—	MF	SCO	Gary Greenhill

== League table ==
Pos	Team	Pld	W	D	L	GF	GA	GD	Pts	Qualification or relegation (Note: Teams played each other three times (33 matches), before the league split into two groups (the top six and the bottom six) for the last five matches.)
2	Rangers	38	25	6	7	76	33	+43	81	Qualification for the Champions League third qualifying round
3	Heart of Midlothian	38	19	11	8	56	40	+16	68	Qualification for the UEFA Cup first round (Note: As Celtic, the 2003–04 Scottish Cup winners, qualified for the UEFA Champions League via their league position, the place in the UEFA Cup was passed onto Dunfermline Athletic, the cup runners-up.)
4	Dunfermline Athletic	38	14	11	13	45	52	−7	53	Qualification for the UEFA Cup first round
5	Dundee United	38	13	10	15	47	60	−13	49	
6	Motherwell	38	12	10	16	42	49	−7	46	

Source: Scottish Professional Football League
Rules for classification: 1) Points; 2) Goal difference; 3) Goals scored
