= 2002–03 Dunfermline Athletic F.C. season =

Dunfermline Athletic
2002–03 season
- Manager: Jimmy Calderwood
- Stadium: East End Park
- Scottish Premier League: Fifth place
- Scottish Cup: Quarter-finals
- Scottish League Cup: Quarter-finals
- Top goalscorer: League: Stevie Crawford (18); All: Stevie Crawford (22)

The 2002–03 season saw Dunfermline Athletic compete in the Scottish Premier League where they finished in 5th position with 46 points.

== Results ==
Dunfermline Athletic's score comes first

=== Legend ===
Win	Draw	Loss

=== Scottish Premier League ===
Match	Date	Opponent	Venue	Result	Attendance	Scorers
1	3 August 2002	Celtic	A	1–2	57,415	Dempsey 74'
2	10 August 2002	Livingston	H	2–1	4,751	Crawford 28', Brewster 50'
3	17 August 2002	Dundee	H	4–2	5,901	Crawford (3) 34', 80', 85' Brewster 69'
4	24 August 2002	Heart of Midlothian	A	0–2	11,367	
5	1 September 2002	Rangers	H	0–6	8,948	
6	11 September 2002	Hibernian	A	4–1	9,837	Walker 11', Brewster (2) 24', 57', Crawford 32'
7	14 September 2002	Dundee United	A	2–1	6,041	Dempsey 9', Brewster 16'
8	21 September 2002	Motherwell	H	1–0	4,987	Bullen 74'
9	21 September 2002	Aberdeen	A	1–3	11,678	Bullen 41'
10	5 October 2002	Partick Thistle	H	4–1	5,522	Thomson 28', Nicholson 68', Crawford (2) 79', 90'
11	19 October 2002	Kilmarnock	A	2–2	5,515	Brewster 43', Bullen 58'
12	27 October 2002	Celtic	H	1–4	9,139	Brewster 56'
13	2 November 2002	Livingston	A	1–1	6,324	Brewster 47'
14	12 November 2002	Dundee	A	3–2	5,475	Brewster 25', Crawford 74', Dair 84'
15	17 November 2002	Heart of Midlothian	H	3–1	4,800	Nicholson 65', Bullen 76', Crawford 90'
16	23 November 2002	Rangers	A	0–3	48,431	
17	30 November 2002	Hibernian	H	1–1	7,515	Crawford 66'
18	4 December 2002	Dundee United	H	4–1	4,342	Brewster (2) 4', 38', Walker 41', Nicholson 55'
19	7 December 2002	Partick Thistle	A	0–4	4,110	
20	15 December 2002	Aberdeen	H	3–0	4,835	Crawford 38', McAllister 46' (o.g.), Brewster 64'
21	26 December 2002	Kilmarnock	A	0–2	5,847	
22	29 December 2002	Celtic	A	0–1	58,387	
23	2 January 2003	Livingston	H	2–0	5,218	Crawford (2) 45', 57'
24	28 January 2003	Dundee	H	0–1	4,237	
25	1 February 2003	Heart of Midlothian	A	0–3	11,281	
26	8 February 2003	Rangers	H	1–3	8,754	Brewster 49'
27	15 February 2003	Hibernian	A	3–1	9,175	Mason 20', Crawford (2) 39', 55'
28	19 February 2003	Motherwell	A	1–2	3,741	Crawford 52'
29	1 March 2003	Dundee United	A	0–3	6,004	
30	9 March 2003	Partick Thistle	H	0–0	4,476	
31	9 March 2003	Kilmarnock	A	1–1	4,021	Shields 57' (o.g.)
32	5 April 2003	Motherwell	H	3–0	4,086	Hampshire 18', Nicholson 50', Hunt 77'
33	12 April 2003	Aberdeen	A	0–1	10,003	
34	26 April 2003	Heart of Midlothian	H	0–1	6,986	
35	3 May 2003	Celtic	H	1–4	8,923	McNicol 80'
36	10 May 2003	Dundee	A	2–2	5,411	Crawford 54', Bullen 90'
37	17 May 2003	Kilmarnock	H	2–2	6,869	Nicholson 5', Mason 11'
38	25 May 2003	Rangers	A	1–6	49,731	Dair 11'

=== Scottish League Cup ===
Match	Date	Opponent	Venue	Result	Attendance	Scorers
Second round	24 September 2002	Cowdenbeath	A	2–1	2,988	Thomson 80', Bullen 100'
Third round	22 October 2002	Falkirk	H	2–0	6,933	Crawford (2) 2', 79'
Quarter-finals	7 November 2002	Rangers	H	0–1	8,415	

=== Scottish Cup ===
Match	Date	Opponent	Venue	Result	Attendance	Scorers
Third round	25 January 2003	Livingston	A	1–1	4,106	Crawford 26'
Third round replay	4 February 2003	Livingston	H	2–0	3,158	Brewster (2) 67', 90'
Fourth round	22 February 2003	Hibernian	H	1–1	6,619	Nicholson 58'
Fourth round eeplay	6 March 2003	Hibernian	A	2–0	5,851	Crawford 57', Wilson 79'
Quarter-finals	23 March 2003	Rangers	H	1–1	9,875	Grondin 23'
Quarter-final replay	9 April 2003	Rangers	A	0–3	24,752	

== League table ==
Pos	Team	Pld	W	D	L	GF	GA	GD	Pts	Qualification or relegation (Note: Teams played each other three times (33 matches), before the league split into two groups (the top six and the bottom six) for the last five matches.)
3	Heart of Midlothian	38	18	9	11	57	51	+6	63	Qualification for the UEFA Cup first round
4	Kilmarnock	38	16	9	13	47	56	−9	57	
5	Dunfermline Athletic	38	13	7	18	54	71	−17	46	
6	Dundee	38	10	14	14	50	60	−10	44	Qualification for the UEFA Cup first round (Note: As Rangers, the 2002–03 Scottish Cup winners, qualified for the UEFA Champions League via their league position, the place in the UEFA Cup was passed onto Dundee, the cup runners-up)
7	Hibernian	38	15	6	17	56	64	−8	51	

Source: Scottish Professional Football League
Rules for classification: 1) Points; 2) Goal difference; 3) Goals scored
