= 2001–02 Dunfermline Athletic F.C. season =

Dunfermline Athletic
2001–02 season
- Manager: Jimmy Calderwood
- Stadium: East End Park
- Scottish Premier League: Sixth place
- Scottish Cup: Fourth round
- Scottish League Cup: Third round
- Top goalscorer: League: Stevie Crawford; Barry Nicholson (7); All: Stevie Crawford (9)
Home colours

The 2001–02 season saw Dunfermline Athletic compete in the Scottish Premier League where they finished in 6th position with 45 points.

== Results ==
Dunfermline Athletic's score comes first

=== Legend ===
Win	Draw	Loss

=== Scottish Premier League ===
Match	Date	Opponent	Venue	Result	Attendance	Scorers
1	28 July 2001	Motherwell	H	5–2	4,830	de Gier 8', 59', Nicholson 46', 70', Bullen 56'
2	4 August 2001	St Johnstone	A	2–0	4,701	Nicholson 6', Nicholls 55'
3	11 August 2001	Rangers	H	1–4	10,902	Klos 52' (o.g.)
4	18 August 2001	Dundee United	A	2–3	7,260	Thomson 61', 77'
5	25 August 2001	Heart of Midlothian	H	0–1	6,992	
6	8 September 2001	Celtic	A	1–3	57,936	Crawford 85'
7	16 September 2001	Hibernian	A	1–5	11,035	Crawford 38'
8	22 September 2001	Livingston	H	1–2	4,516	Crawford 8'
9	30 September 2001	Kilmarnock	H	0–2	3,983	
10	13 October 2001	Dundee	H	1–0	5,094	Hampshire 26'
11	20 October 2001	Aberdeen	A	2–3	11,195	Crawford 68', de Gier 78'
12	27 October 2001	St Johnstone	H	2–1	4,494	de Gier 63', 77'
13	3 November 2001	Motherwell	A	0–1	4,578	
14	10 November 2001	Dundee United	A	2–0	6,241	Petrie 13', Crawford 63'
15	17 November 2001	Rangers	A	0–4	48,554	
16	24 November 2001	Dundee United	H	1–1	4,891	Petrie 69'
17	1 December 2001	Heart of Midlothian	A	1–1	11,176	Nicholson 73'
18	9 December 2001	Celtic	H	0–4	8,207	
19	15 December 2001	Hibernian	H	1–0	6,617	Nicholson 74'
20	22 December 2001	Livingston	A	0–0	5,326	
21	26 December 2001	Kilmarnock	A	0–0	6,873	
22	29 December 2001	Aberdeen	H	1–0	7,774	Bullen 22'
23	12 January 2002	St Johnstone	A	1–0	3,459	Mason 80'
24	19 January 2002	Motherwell	H	3–1	4,280	Skerla 25', Mason 49', Bullen 59'
25	23 January 2002	Rangers	H	2–4	8,795	Thomson 17', 33'
26	2 February 2002	Heart of Midlothian	H	1–1	5,527	Thomson 54'
27	9 February 2002	Celtic	A	0–5	58,590	
28	13 February 2002	Dundee	A	2–2	6,043	Thomson 48', Nicholson 90'
29	16 February 2002	Hibernian	A	1–1	9,788	Hampshire 59'
30	2 March 2002	Livingston	H	1–0	5,032	Bullen 51'
31	9 March 2002	Kilmarnock	H	2–0	5,613	N'Diaye 67', Hampshire 76'
32	16 March 2002	Aberdeen	A	0–1	13,764	
33	23 March 2002	Dundee	H	2–0	7,299	Nicholson 33', Crawford 52'
34	6 April 2002	Aberdeen	H	0–0	7,339	
35	13 April 2002	Celtic	A	0–5	57,016	
36	20 April 2002	Heart of Midlothian	A	0–2	10,108	
37	28 April 2002	Livingston	A	1–4	8,749	Dair 42'
38	12 May 2002	Rangers	H	1–1	8,716	Crawford 86'

=== Scottish League Cup ===
Match	Date	Opponent	Venue	Result	Attendance	Scorers
Second round	26 September 2001	Alloa Athletic	H	3–0	2,796	Nicholson 36', Mason 58' 76'
Third round	9 October 2001	Inverness Caledonian Thistle	H	1–1 (1–4 pens)	2,206	Hampshire 63'

=== Scottish Cup ===
Match	Date	Opponent	Venue	Result	Attendance	Scorers
Third round	5 January 2002	Motherwell	H	3–1	5,131	Crawford 22', 46', Thomson 38'
Fourth round	26 January 2002	Ayr United	A	0–3	3,681	

== League table ==
Pos	Team	Pld	W	D	L	GF	GA	GD	Pts	Qualification or relegation (Note: Teams played each other three times (33 matches), before the league split into two groups (the top six and the bottom six) for the last five matches.)
4	Aberdeen	38	16	7	15	51	49	+2	55	Qualification for the UEFA Cup qualifying round (Note: As both finalists of the 2001–02 Scottish Cup, Rangers and Celtic, qualified for European competition via their league position, the cup berth for 2002–03 UEFA Cup was passed to the next-placed team in the league, fourth-placed Aberdeen.)
5	Heart of Midlothian	38	14	6	18	52	57	−5	48	
6	Dunfermline Athletic	38	12	9	17	41	64	−23	45	
7	Kilmarnock	38	13	10	15	44	54	−10	49	
8	Dundee United	38	12	10	16	38	59	−21	46	

Source: Scottish Professional Football League
Rules for classification: (1) Points; (2) Goal difference; (3) Goals scored
