= 2000–01 Dunfermline Athletic F.C. season =

Dunfermline Athletic
2000–01 season
- Manager: Jimmy Calderwood
- Stadium: East End Park
- Scottish Premier League: Ninth place
- Scottish Cup: Fourth Round
- Scottish League Cup: Quarter-finals
- Top goalscorer: Stevie Crawford (9)
Home colours

The 2000–01 season saw Dunfermline Athletic compete in the Scottish Premier League where they finished in 9th position with 42 points.

== Results ==
Dunfermline Athletic's score comes first

=== Legend ===
Win	Draw	Loss

=== Scottish Premier League ===
Match	Date	Opponent	Venue	Result	Attendance	Scorers
1	29 July 2000	Aberdeen	H	0–0	7,563	
2	5 August 2000	Dundee	A	0–3	7,152	
3	12 August 2000	St Johnstone	H	1–1	4,124	Crawford 45'
4	16 August 2000	Motherwell	H	1–0	5,257	Moss 55'
5	19 August 2000	Rangers	A	1–4	47,452	Boyle 14'
6	26 August 2000	Dundee United	H	1–0	4,980	Crawford 42'
7	9 September 2000	Heart of Midlothian	A	0–2	11,811	
8	18 September 2000	Celtic	H	1–2	9,493	Crawford 60'
9	23 September 2000	Hibernian	H	1–1	8,275	Moss 48'
10	30 September 2000	St Mirren	A	1–2	5,002	Dair 64'
11	14 October 2000	Kilmarnock	A	1–2	6,436	Crawford 30'
12	21 October 2000	Aberdeen	A	0–0	11,993	
13	28 October 2000	Dundee	H	1–0	6,397	Moss 61'
14	4 November 2000	St Johnstone	A	2–0	4,287	Dair 70', Nicholson 76'
15	11 November 2000	Motherwell	H	1–2	4,488	Moss 11'
16	18 November 2000	Rangers	H	0–0	11,431	
17	25 November 2000	Dundee United	A	2–3	6,012	Bullen 60', Moss 64'
18	29 November 2000	Heart of Midlothian	H	1–0	5,642	Dair 40'
19	2 December 2000	Celtic	A	1–3	59,442	Dair 1'
20	9 December 2000	Hibernian	A	0–3	10,078	
21	16 December 2000	St Mirren	H	2–0	5,061	Thomson 37', McGroarty 73'
22	23 December 2000	Kilmarnock	H	1–0	6,054	Crawford 22'
23	26 December 2000	Aberdeen	H	3–2	7,194	Crawford 13', Rossi 46', Nicholson 51'
24	2 January 2001	St Johnstone	H	0–0	6,408	
25	31 January 2001	Motherwell	A	1–1	4,601	Bullen 89'
26	3 February 2001	Rangers	A	0–2	46,302	
27	10 February 2001	Dundee United	H	3–1	5,108	Hampshire 49', Dijkhuizen 82', Moss 85'
28	21 February 2001	Dundee	A	1–0	6,113	Nicholson 13'
29	24 February 2001	Heart of Midlothian	A	1–7	11,251	Dair 50'
30	4 March 2001	Celtic	H	0–3	9,096	
31	17 March 2001	Hibernian	H	2–1	7,547	Crawford 29', Hampshire 57'
32	31 March 2001	St Mirren	A	1–1	5,371	Crawford 8'
33	7 April 2001	Kilmarnock	A	1–2	6,529	Bullen 61'
34	21 April 2001	Aberdeen	A	0–1	8,613	
35	28 April 2001	St Mirren	H	1–2	5,058	Bullen 90'
36	6 May 2001	Dundee United	A	0–1	6,679	
37	12 May 2001	Motherwell	H	1–2	2,610	Crawford 64'
38	20 May 2001	St Johnstone	H	0–0	4,607	

=== Scottish League Cup ===
Match	Date	Opponent	Venue	Result	Attendance	Scorers
Second round	22 August 2000	East Stirlingshire	H	1–0	2,500	Boyle 14'
Third round	6 September 2000	Motherwell	H	2–0	3,428	Thomson 12', Moss 66'
Quarter-finals	31 October 2000	St Mirren	A	1–2	4,045	Nicholson 29'

=== Scottish Cup ===
Match	Date	Opponent	Venue	Result	Attendance	Scorers
Third round	27 January 2001	St Johnstone	A	0–0	5,026	
Third round replay	13 February 2001	St Johnstone	H	3–2	4,749	Thomson 61', Dijkhuizen 77', Moss 83'
Fourth round	17 February 2001	Celtic	H	2–2	11,222	Skerla 83', Nicholson 90'
Fourth round replay	7 March 2001	Celtic	A	1–4	31,940	Thomson 28'

== League table ==
Pos	Team	Pld	W	D	L	GF	GA	GD	Pts	Qualification or relegation (Note: Teams played each other three times (33 matches), before the league split into two groups (the top six and the bottom six) for the last five matches.)
7	Aberdeen	38	11	12	15	45	52	−7	45	
8	Motherwell	38	12	7	19	42	56	−14	43	
9	Dunfermline Athletic	38	11	9	18	34	54	−20	42	
10	St Johnstone	38	9	13	16	40	56	−16	40	
11	Dundee United	38	9	8	21	38	63	−25	35	

Source: Scottish Professional Football League
Rules for classification: 1) Points; 2) Goal difference; 3) Goals scored
