= 2007–08 Scottish Challenge Cup =

Tournament details
- Country: Scotland
- Teams: 30

Final positions
- Champions: St Johnstone
- Runners-up: Dunfermline Athletic

Tournament statistics
- Matches played: 29
- Goals scored: 90 (3.1 per match)

The 2007–08 Scottish Challenge Cup was the 17th season of the Scottish Challenge Cup, which was competed for by all 30 members of the Scottish Football League. The defending champions were Ross County who defeated Clyde 5–4 on penalties in the 2006 final. Ross County were eliminated in the second round after a 2–0 home defeat to eventual champions St Johnstone.

The final was played on 25 November 2007, between Dunfermline Athletic and St Johnstone, at Dens Park in Dundee. St Johnstone won 3–2. It was their first cup win in their 122-year existence.

== Schedule ==
Round	First match date	Fixtures	Clubs
First round	14 August 2007	14	30 → 16
Second round	4 September 2007	8	16 → 8
Quarter-finals	18 September 2007	4	8 → 4
Semi-finals	2 October 2007	2	4 → 2
Final	25 November 2007	1	2 → 1

== First round ==
=== North and East region ===
Dunfermline Athletic received a random bye into the second round.

14 August 2007	Dundee	1–2	Ross County	Dens Park, Dundee
	Sturm 59'; O'Brien (red card) 90'	Report	Barrowman 12' (pen.); Keddie 43'	Attendance: 1,471; Referee: D McDonald

14 August 2007	Elgin City	1–4	Brechin City	Borough Briggs, Elgin
	Nicholson 88'	Report	Russell 9', 60' (pen.); Janczyk 70'; Johnson 74'	Attendance: 166; Referee: C MacKay

14 August 2007	Forfar Athletic	3–2	East Fife	Station Park, Forfar
	Lombardi 26'; Tulloch 85'; Lunan 104'	Report	Walker 53'; O'Reilly 69'	Attendance: 319; Referee: S MacDonald

14 August 2007	Montrose	5–1	Stirling Albion	Links Park, Montrose
	Baird 11' (pen.), 32', 59'; Wood 50', 52'	Report	Harris 51'	Attendance: 271; Referee: C Brown

14 August 2007	Peterhead	1–0	Cowdenbeath	Balmoor, Peterhead
	Cowie 90'	Report		Attendance: 531; Referee: A Freeland

14 August 2007	Raith Rovers	1 – 1 (a.e.t.) (4–5 p)	St Johnstone	Stark's Park, Kirkcaldy
	Tod 89'; Silvestro (red card) 90'	Report	Sheerin 14' (pen.)	Attendance: 1,801; Referee: C Boyle

15 August 2007	Arbroath	2–0	Alloa Athletic	Gayfield Park, Arbroath
	McKay 40'; Reilly 81'	Report	Buist (red card) 39'	Attendance: 522; Referee: E Smith

Source: BBC Sport

=== South and West region ===
Partick Thistle received a random bye into the second round.

14 August 2007	Albion Rovers	1 – 1 (a.e.t.) (3–4 p)	Berwick Rangers	Cliftonhill, Coatbridge
	McKenzie 90'	Report	Swanson 73'	Attendance: 152; Referee: J McKendrick

14 August 2007	Clyde	1–0	Queen of the South	Broadwood Stadium, Cumbernauld
	Masterton 13'	Report		Attendance: 950; Referee: J Underhill

14 August 2007	East Stirlingshire	4–2	Dumbarton	Firs Park, Falkirk
	Simpson 32', 48'; Struthers 71', 88'	Report	Campbell 31', 53'	Attendance: 202; Referee: A Law

14 August 2007	Hamilton Academical	1–2	Ayr United	New Douglas Park, Hamilton
	Taylor 17'	Report	Moore 60'; Stevenson 76'	Attendance: 611; Referee: M McCurry

14 August 2007	Greenock Morton	1–0	Livingston	Cappielow, Greenock
	Graham 26'	Report		Attendance: 1,658; Referee: S Conroy

14 August 2007	Queen's Park	1–0	Stranraer	Hampden Park, Glasgow
	Canning 64'	Report		Attendance: 387; Referee: A Boyd

14 August 2007	Stenhousemuir	1–3	Airdrie United	Ochilview Park, Stenhousemuir
	Dempster 59'	Report	McEwan 16' (o.g.); Lyle 82' (o.g.); Noble 85'	Attendance: 583; Referee: C Allan

Source: BBC Sport

== Second round ==
4 September 2007	Airdrie United	5–1	Arbroath	Excelsior Stadium, Airdrie
	Russell 15', 61', 85' (pen.), 86'; McDonald 26'	Report	Tosh 37'; Rennie (red card) 89'	Attendance: 754; Referee: A Muir

4 September 2007	East Stirlingshire	1–0	Queen's Park	Firs Park, Falkirk
	Simpson 33'	Report		Attendance: 379; Referee: S Nicholls

4 September 2007	Forfar Athletic	0–2	Ayr United	Station Park, Forfar
	Fotheringham (red card) 86'	Report	Williams 32'; Stevenson 57'	Attendance: 333; Referee: M Tumilty

4 September 2007	Montrose	1 – 2 (a.e.t.)	Brechin City	Links Park, Montrose
	Stein 103'	Report	Johnston 104'; Nelson 111'	Attendance: 715; Referee: S Finnie

4 September 2007	Partick Thistle	3–1	Berwick Rangers	Firhill Stadium, Glasgow
	Harkins 26' di Giacomo 86'; Keegan 90'	Report	Thompson 78'	Attendance: 1,226; Referee: S O'Reilly

4 September 2007	Peterhead	0–1	Greenock Morton	Balmoor, Peterhead
		Report	McAlister 18'	Attendance: 650; Referee: C Brown

5 September 2007	Clyde	1–4	Dunfermline Athletic	Broadwood Stadium, Cumbernauld
	MacLennan 46'	Report	Burchill 26', 74'; Morrison 57', 90'	Attendance: 799; Referee: W Collum

5 September 2007	Ross County	0–2	St Johnstone	Victoria Park, Dingwall
		Report	Deuchar 14'; Jackson 49'	Attendance: 1,100; Referee: I Brines

Source: BBC Sport

== Quarter-finals ==
18 September 2007

Airdrie United	0–2	Dunfermline Athletic
McKeown (red card) 86'	Report	Burchill 54', 81'; Woods (red card) 86'

Excelsior Stadium, Airdrie
Attendance: 931
Referee: M Tumilty

18 September 2007

Ayr United	2 – 1 (a.e.t.)	Partick Thistle
Williams 86' (pen.), 120'	Report	Forrest 65' (o.g.)

Somerset Park, Ayr
Attendance: 1,110
Referee: W Collum

18 September 2007

East Stirlingshire	0–4	Greenock Morton
	Report	Templeman 49', 82'; Moffat 61' (o.g.); Linn 83'

Firs Park, Falkirk
Attendance: 488
Referee: B Winter

25 September 2007

St Johnstone	4–1	Brechin City
Deuchar 21', 42'; Jackson 36'; Weatherston 43'	Report	Smith 57'

McDiarmid Park, Perth
Attendance: 1,159
Referee: C Allan

== Semi-finals ==
2 October 2007

Dunfermline Athletic	1–0	Ayr United
Glass 83'	Report

East End Park, Dunfermline
Attendance: 1,744
Referee: K Clark

2 October 2007

Greenock Morton	1–3	St Johnstone
Graham 12'	Report	Jackson 10'; MacDonald 65'; Quinn 87'

Cappielow, Greenock
Attendance: 1,831
Referee: S Conroy

== Final ==
25 November 2007
15:00

Dunfermline Athletic	2–3	St Johnstone
Wilson 37'; Glass 70' (pen.)	Report	Sheerin 13' (pen.); MacDonald 19'; Deuchar 30'

Dens Park, Dundee
Attendance: 6,446
Referee: E Smith
