= Andy Reilly =

Andy Reilly is the name of:

- Andy Reilly (footballer, born 1985), English-born Scottish player for Wycombe
- Andy Reilly (footballer, born 1986), Scottish player for Dundee and Arbroath
