= Rocco Quinn =

Scottish footballer (born 1986)

Personal information
- Date of birth: 7 September 1986 (age 40)
- Place of birth: Glasgow, Scotland
- Position: Attacking midfielder

Youth career
- 2002–2004: Celtic

Senior career*
| Years | Team | Apps | (Gls) |
| 2004–2009 | Celtic | 0 | (0) |
| 2007 | → Kilmarnock (loan) | 6 | (0) |
| 2007–2008 | → St Johnstone (loan) | 21 | (4) |
| 2008–2009 | → Livingston (loan) | 15 | (1) |
| 2009 | Hamilton Academical | 2 | (0) |
| 2009–2011 | Queen of the South | 49 | (6) |
| 2011–2016 | Ross County | 111 | (11) |
| 2016–2017 | St Mirren | 27 | (1) |
| Total | | 231 | (23) |

International career
| 2006–2008 | Scotland U21 | 9 | (1) |
- * Club domestic league appearances and goals

Rocco Quinn (born 7 September 1986) is a Scottish retired professional footballer who played as a midfielder. Quinn played for Celtic, Hamilton Academical, Queen of the South, Ross County and St Mirren, as well as Kilmarnock, St Johnstone and Livingston on loan.

== Club career ==
Born in Glasgow, Scotland, Quinn began his career with Celtic and progressed through the club's youth system. He then appeared as an unused substitute on two occasions during the 2004–05 season. Quinn then signed a contract with Celtic, keeping him until 2008.

In Celtic's pre–season tour of 2006, Quinn scored in a friendly match, in a 1–1 draw against New England Revolution. However, he did not make a competitive first team appearance for Celtic with all of his first-team experience at this stage coming in three loan spells at other clubs.

=== Loan Spells from Celtic ===
On 19 January 2007, Quinn spent the second half of the 2006–07 season on loan to Kilmarnock. He made his debut for the club the next day against Dundee United and started the match and played 81 minutes before being substituted, in a 1–0 win. Quinn then made a number of starts for Kilmarnock before losing his place as the season progressed. At the end of the 2006–07 season, he made seven appearances in all competitions.

On 1 September 2007, Quinn joined St Johnstone on loan in an attempt to get some first-team experience. He made his debut for the club, starting the whole game, in a 0–0 draw against Dunfermline Athletic on 3 September 2007. Quinn scored his first-ever league goal in St Johnstone's 2–1 victory over Partick Thistle at McDiarmid Park on 15 September 2007. Since joining St Johnstone, Quinn became a first team regular, playing in the midfield position. He then scored the second goal of the season, in a 3–1 win against Greenock Morton to help the club reach the Scottish Challenge Cup final. Quinn started in the final and helped St Johnstone win the Scottish Challenge Cup, beating Dunfermline Athletic 3–2 in the final. His performances led to the club keen on signing him permanently. Amid to his future at St Johnstone, he scored his third goal for the club, in a 5–2 win against Livingston on 22 December 2007. However, St Johnstone failed to sign Quinn permanently after learning the transfer value was ‘’"too high"’’ for the club. He suffered ankle injury and was substituted in the 51st minute, in a 0–0 draw against Stirling Albion on 26 December 2007, leading him to return to his parent club. Quinn returned to St Johnstone in February 2008 on an emergency loan for the remainder of the 2007–08 season. However, he suffered ankle injury and was substituted at half-time, in a 3–2 loss against Dundee on 1 March 2008. After missing one match, Quinn returned to the starting line–up, in a 2–1 win against Queen of the South on 11 March 2008. He scored on 15 March 2008 and 18 March 2008 against Livingston (twice) and St Mirren respectively. However, Quinn suffered a hamstring injury that saw him out for the rest of the 2007–08 season. At the end of the 2007–08 season, he made twenty–six appearances and scoring six times in all competitions.

On 8 August 2008, Quinn joined Livingston on loan for the 2008–09 season. The club previously were unsuccessful in signing him two–years ago. He made his debut for the club, coming on as a second-half substitute, in a 1–0 win against Forfar Athletic in the quarter-finals of the Scottish League Cup. Since joining Livingston, Quinn became a first team regular, playing in the midfield position. On 13 December 2008, he scored his first goal for the club, scoring from a 25-yard, in a 4–1 win against Ross County. Quinn returned to his parent club in January 2009 despite Livingston's attempt to keep him. He made nineteen appearances and scoring once in all competitions.

=== Hamilton Academical ===
Quinn left Celtic permanently in January 2009, signing for Hamilton Academical on the last day of the transfer window.

He made his debut for the club, starting a match and played 66 minutes before being substituted, in a 2–1 win against Dundee United in the last 16 of the Scottish Cup. A month later on 8 March 2009, Quinn scored his first goal for Hamilton Academical, in a 5–1 loss against Rangers in the quarter-finals of the Scottish Cup. However, lack of match fitness caused him to become sulprus of requirements at the club. At the end of the 2008–09 season, he made four appearances and scoring once in all competitions. On 26 May 2009, Quinn was released by Hamilton Academical.

=== Queen of the South ===
Quinn signed for Dumfries side Queen of the South on 29 May 2009.

He promptly established himself as a first team regular, scoring a competitive debut goal in the Scottish League Cup 4–1 win away at Queens Park on 1 August 2009. His league debut was the 1–1 home draw a week later against Raith Rovers. On 29 August 2009, Quinn scored his second goal for the club, in a 2–0 win against Ayr United. After missing one match due to illness, he returned to the starting line–up, and set up one of the goals, in a 3–1 win against Inverness Caledonian Thistle on 10 October 2009. On 29 December 2009, Quinn scored his third goal of the season, in a 2–2 draw against Partick Thistle. After missing one match in early–March, he returned to the first team, coming on as a 49th-minute substitute, in a 3–1 loss against Inverness Caledonian Thistle on 9 March 2010. On 3 April 2010, Quinn scored twice for Queen of the South, in a 3–3 draw against Greenock Morton. Having helped the Palmerston Park side ended the 2009–10 season in fifth place, he finished his first season, making thirty–seven appearances and scoring five goals in all competitions.

In the 2010–11 season, Quinn scored his first goal of the season, in a 5–1 win against Dumbarton in the first round of the Scottish League Cup. He then scored his second goal of the season, in a 3–0 win against Ross County on 28 August 2010. After missing one match due to his fitness concern, Quinn scored his third goal of the season, in a 2–1 win against Partick Thistle on 18 September 2010. After missing two matches, he returned to the starting line–up, in a 2–0 loss against Greenock Morton on 16 October 2010. However, his return was short–lived when Quinn suffered an illness and did not play for a month. But on 11 December 2010, he returned to the first team, coming on as a 64th-minute substitute, in a 1–0 win against Dunfermline Athletic. However, in a match against Dunfermline Athletic on 26 February 2011, Quinn suffered a hamstring injury and was substituted at half-time, in a 3–1 loss. But on 23 April 2011, he made his return from injury, coming on as a second-half substitute, in a 2–2 draw against Cowdenbeath. At the end of the 2010–11 season, Quinn made twenty–three appearances and scoring three times in all competitions.

=== Ross County ===
The Queen of the South website confirmed on 18 June 2011 that Quinn had left and signed for Ross County.

He made his debut for the club, starting a match and played 74 minutes before being substituted, in a 5–1 loss against Hamilton Academical on 14 August 2011. Since joining Ross County, Quinn became a first team regular, playing in the midfield position. At times, however, he found himself placed on the substitute bench, due to competitions. On 15 October 2011, Quinn scored his first goal for the club, and set up the equalising goal, in a 2–1 win against Dundee. After missing two matches, he returned to the first team, coming on as a 42nd-minute substitute, in a 1–0 win against Partick Thistle on 5 November 2011. On 3 December 2011, Quinn scored his second goal for Ross County, in a 4–2 win against Raith Rovers. On 17 March 2012, he scored his third goal for the club, in a 2–1 win against Falkirk. However, in a match against Dundee on 14 April 2012, Quinn received a red card for a second bookable offence, in a 3–0 win. After serving a one match suspension, he returned to the first team, coming on as a 82nd-minute substitute, against Hamilton Academical on 28 April 2012, and helped Ross County win 5–1 to seal Scottish First Division by a record margin of 24 points and promotion to the Scottish Premier League for the first time in the club's history. At the end of the 2011–12 season, Quinn made thirty–two appearances and scoring two times in all competitions.

In the 2012–13 season, Quinn remained at Ross County for another season. Having missed the first two league matches of the season, he made his first appearance of the season, in a 1–1 draw against Celtic on 19 August 2012. Since returning to the first team, Quinn became a first team regular, playing in the midfield position. He scored twice for the club, in a 5–4 loss against St Mirren on 29 September 2012. After serving a one match suspension, Quinn returned to the starting line–up, in a 2–1 loss against Dundee United on 24 November 2012. He scored on 1 December 2012 and 8 December 2012 against Inverness Caledonian Thistle and Motherwell (twice) respectively. Since returning from suspension, Quinn continued to retain his place in the first team, playing in the midfield position. On 2 February 2013, he scored his sixth goal of the season and set up the equalising goal in the last minute of the game, in a 2–2 draw against Hearts. However, by May, Quinn suffered a broken nose that saw him out of the 2012–13 season. Despite this, teammate Michael Fraser praised Quinn, saying: "Rocco Quinn has been my man of the season. A lot of players have been different class, but I think Rocco has been wonderfully consistent. He is an unsung hero and quite a quiet guy, but he has scored some cracking goals and he can play." After helping the club to a fifth-place finish in 2012–13 season, Quinn made thirty–three appearances and scoring six times in all competitions. On 22 May 2013, he signed a new contract.

At the start of the 2013–14 season, Quinn continued to regain his first team place, playing in the midfield position. However, his form soon dropped badly, due to Ross County's poor results, a mistake he acknowledged. On 15 September 2013, Quinn scored his first goal of the season, in a 4–2 loss against Dundee United. On 5 October 2013, he scored the only goal of the game, in a 1–0 win against Aberdeen. Quinn's poor form at the club continued that he saw his playing time coming from the substitute bench. In the January transfer window, manager Derek Adams denied the transfer move of Quinn's move to English club, Swindon Town. Despite this, he helped Ross County avoid relegation and maintained their league status. At the end of the 2013–14 season, Quinn made thirty–one appearances and scoring two times in all competitions.

At the start of the 2014–15 season, Quinn regained his first team place, playing in the midfield position. He captained Ross County for the first time and played the whole game, in a 2–1 loss against Motherwell on 13 September 2014. After the match, manager Jim McIntyre praised Quinn, saying: "Rocco has good experience. He's a talker on the park. That was the reason he was in the team. I wouldn't have picked him as captain if I didn't think he was up to the job. I thought he did particularly well on Saturday. But it would be wrong to just single Rocco out because he was named as captain." Quinn set up a goal for Yoann Arquin, in a 1–1 draw against local rivals, Inverness Caledonian Thistle on 5 October 2014. During the match, he suffered a hip injury and was substituted in the 49th minute. After the match, it was announced that Quinn would be out for several months. By March, he made his return to full training. He played his first match since returning from injury, playing for club's development team for 30 minutes against Celtic's development team on 6 March 2015, losing 2–0. On 25 April 2015, Quinn returned to the first team, coming on as a 57th-minute substitute, in a 2–1 loss against Partick Thistle. He, once again, helped Ross County avoid relegation and maintained their league status after beating Hamilton Academical on 16 May 2015. On the last game of the season against Kilmarnock, Quinn scored the winning goal, in a 2–1 win to help the club finish ninth place. At the end of the 2014–15 season, he made sixteen appearances and scoring once in all competitions. Shortly after, Quinn signed a contract extension with Ross County for another season.

At the start of the 2015–16 season, Quinn appeared in the first eight games of the season, rotating in and out of the starting line–up. However, he suffered a hamstring injury during a 1–1 draw against Motherwell on 12 September 2015 and was out for six weeks. Having returned to full training from his injury, Quinn remained out of the first team for a month. On 26 December 2015, he made his return from injury, coming on as a 72nd-minute substitute, in a 5–2 win against Dundee. By the time Quinn left Ross County, he made twelve appearances and scoring once in all competitions.

=== St Mirren ===
After five-years with the Dingwall side, Quinn moved to Scottish Championship side St Mirren on 15 January 2016.

He made his debut for the club, starting the whole game, in a 3–1 loss against Hibernian on 23 January 2016. Since joining St Mirren, Quinn started in the next seven matches for the side. However, in a match against Raith Rovers on 5 March 2016, he suffered an injury and was substituted in the 25th minute, as the club loss 4–3. After missing four matches, Quinn returned to the starting line–up against Hibernian on 2 April 2016 and scored his first goal for St Mirren, in a 2–2 draw. He then started in the remaining four matches of the 2015–16 season, including an assist, in a 3–1 win against local rivals, Greenock Morton on 16 April 2016. Quinn agreed a new two-year deal with Saints on 30 April 2016, tying him to the club until the end of 2017–18 season. At the end of the 2015–16 season, Quinn made thirteen appearances and scoring once in all competitions.

Quinn made his first appearance of the 2016–17 season, starting a match and played 89 minutes before suffering ankle injury that saw him substituted, in a 3–2 win against Livingston in the group stage of the Scottish League Cup. After the match, he was out for several weeks. On 4 September 2016, Quinn made his return from injury, coming on as a 76th-minute substitute, in a 4–3 win against Albion Rovers in the third round of the Scottish Challenge Cup. However, his return was short–lived when he suffered an injury that kept him out for a month. On 29 November 2016, Quinn made his return from injury, coming on as a 59th-minute substitute, in a 5–1 win against Spartans in the third round of the Scottish FA Cup. Since returning from injury, he regained his first team place for St Mirren for two months, playing in the midfield position. In a match against Dunfermline Athletic on 14 January 2017, Quinn suffered an injury and was substituted in the 58th minute, as the match ended in a 1–1 draw. After the match, he did not play for three months due to the injury. On 11 April 2017, Quinn made his first team return from injury, coming on as a late substitute, in a 4–1 win against local rivals, Greenock Morton. At the end of the 2016–17 season, he made eighteen appearances in all competitions.

Quinn made his only appearance of the 2017–18 season where he came on as a 73rd-minute substitute, in a 4–1 win against Stranraer in the group stage of the Scottish League Cup. It was announced on 3 August 2017 that Quinn was released by St Mirren after just one year into his new deal. Shortly after, he retired from professional at aged 31, due to his persistent injuries.

== International career ==
In October 2004, Quinn was called up to the Scotland U19 and made his debut for the under-19 side, in a 4–0 win against San Marino U19. He went on to make four appearances for Scotland U19.

In May 2006, Quinn was called up to the Scotland U21 for the first time. He made his debut for the under-21 side, starting a match and played 75 minutes before being substituted, in a 1–1 draw against Turkey U21 on 20 May 2006. In January 2007, Quinn was called up to the Scotland U21 squad once again. On 6 February 2007, he started the match and played 69 minutes before being substituted, in a 2–0 loss against Germany U21. Six months later, Quinn was called up to the Scotland U21 squad and made an appearance, playing 34 minutes, in a 0–0 draw against Denmark U21. On 5 February 2008, he scored his first goal for under-21 side, in a 2–1 loss against Portugal U21, in what turns out to be his last appearance for Scotland U21.

== Personal life ==
Quinn was a boyhood Hamilton Academical’s supporter. He is a younger brother of Dario Quinn, who’s also a footballer.

In January 2012, Quinn was involved in a bizarre incident when he tried to break into his own home, prompting neighbours to call the police and was arrested. Following the misunderstanding, Quinn was released without charges and paid for the damages.

Following his retirement from professional football, Quinn began a new career, working as a project manager for an IT company, which has contracts within the oil and gas industry and the NHS in Scotland. He ruled out becoming a coach and manager.

== Honours ==
St Johnstone

- Scottish Challenge Cup: 2007–08
