= Darren Young (Scottish footballer) =

Scottish footballer (born 1978)

Personal information
- Date of birth: 13 October 1978 (age 48)
- Place of birth: Cambuslang, Scotland
- Position: Midfielder

Team information
- Current team: Clyde (manager)

Youth career
- Cathkin United
- Mill United
- 1993–1995: Aberdeen

Senior career*
Years	Team	Apps	(Gls)
1995–2003	Aberdeen	132	(4)
1995–1996	→ Crombie Sports (loan)		
2003–2008	Dunfermline Athletic	124	(8)
2008–2010	Dundee	13	(2)
2010	Queen of the South (trial)	2	(0)
2010–2011	Greenock Morton	14	(0)
2011–2014	Alloa Athletic	71	(2)
2014–2017	Albion Rovers	21	(2)
2017–2019	East Fife	0	(0)

International career
1997–2000	Scotland U21	7	(0)

Managerial career
- 2014–2017: Albion Rovers
- 2017–2021: East Fife
- 2021–2024: Stirling Albion
- 2024–: Clyde
- * Club domestic league appearances and goals

Darren Young (born 13 October 1978) is a Scottish football coach and former player, who manages Scottish League Two club Clyde.

Over the course of his career he has also played for Aberdeen, Dundee, Dunfermline Athletic and Greenock Morton. Between his spells at Dundee and Morton, Young played two trial matches for Queen of the South.

Young has also managed several clubs, being in charge of Albion Rovers and East Fife in the Scottish lower leagues.

== Playing career ==
=== Aberdeen ===
Born in Glasgow, Young grew up in Whitlawburn, Cambuslang and attended Cathkin High School. He started his career at Aberdeen (where he was later to be joined by younger brother Derek), joining the senior squad after a loan spell at Crombie Sports on 29 February 1996. He made a quick impact, making his first team debut against Hearts in August 1996, aged only 17. Young's prodigious development which had seen him awarded several Scotland Under-21 caps was hindered however, by a serious knee injury which required three separate operations to repair.

Young made a successful return to the Aberdeen first team in 2000, by which stage his brother Derek was also an established member of Ebbe Skovdahl's resurgent side. Darren was soon awarded the captaincy and led the Dons to a 4th-place finish in the league in the 2001–02 season. This ensured European football returned to Pittodrie and Young increased his continental appearances to 10, as Aberdeen played FC Nistru Otaci and Hertha BSC Berlin in the 2002–03 UEFA Cup.

=== Dunfermline Athletic ===
Darren and his brother Derek both joined Dunfermline Athletic in July 2003, as part of Jimmy Calderwood's new-look side. They were part of the team defeated 3–1 by Celtic in the Scottish Cup Final at Hampden Park in May 2004. Young was once again blighted by injuries the following season but helped the Pars retain their SPL status in the 2005–06 season. They also reached the League Cup Final where Celtic again proved too strong – Young scored the winning goal in the semis, but did not play in that final due to a foot injury.

In July 2006, his brother was released by Dunfermline (eventually signing for St Johnstone), ensuring the Young brothers would play separately for the first time in their professional careers. In the 2007 Scottish Cup Final, Dunfermline and Young lost to Celtic in a major final for the third time in quick succession, with the player receiving the small consolation of the Man of the match award. The club had already been relegated from the top division weeks earlier.

After defeat in another cup final, this time in the 2007–08 Scottish Challenge Cup, in May 2008 Young rejected Dunfermline's final contract offer meaning he would leave East End Park after five years with the Pars.

=== Dundee ===
In May 2008, Young signed for First Division club Dundee. Young was sent off after three minutes into his debut for Dundee, during a league match against Clyde at Broadwood Stadium after pulling back an opponent. He was released by the club on 4 May 2010.

=== Later playing career ===
Young featured in two games as a trialist for Dumfries club Queen of the South early in the 2010–11 season, during the reign of Kenny Brannigan's management. In the second game for the Palmerston club he was substituted due to injury after 10 minutes. Young then went on trial at Greenock Morton after a spate of injuries to their midfield. He was offered training facilities and the possibility of trial matches. After playing well in his three games, he was signed until the end of the year. After a dozen league appearances, Young was released in May 2011.

Young signed for Alloa Athletic in July 2011. He was appointed captain and led the team to the Third Division title in the 2011–12 season.

=== International career ===
Young won seven Scotland under-21 caps. He also travelled with the Scotland squad to the 1998 FIFA World Cup as a hamper boy.

== Coaching career ==
=== Albion Rovers ===
Young was appointed player/manager of League Two club Albion Rovers in June 2014. In his first match in charge, he scored the winning penalty as Albion Rovers beat Airdrieonians 4–2 on penalties following a 2–2 draw in the Scottish Challenge Cup on 26 July 2014. Young won the League Two championship and promotion in his first season as a manager, sealing the league with a 3–2 win against Clyde.

On getting his team promoted into League One, despite budget restraints and low expectations Young led Albion Rovers to their best start to a third tier season in the club's history, taking 28 points from their first 17 games and placed third. They finished the 2015–16 Scottish League One season in sixth place. Towards the end of the 2016–17 season, Albion Rovers announced that Young would leave the club as they had failed to agree a new contract.

=== East Fife ===
Shortly after leaving Albion Rovers, Young was appointed manager of Scottish League One club East Fife on 3 June 2017. He was sacked in November 2021, after a defeat against Clyde that left East Fife five points adrift at the bottom of League One.

=== Stirling Albion ===
On 20 December 2021, Young was named as the new manager of Scottish League Two side Stirling Albion. They won promotion to League One in 2023 by winning the 2022–23 Scottish League Two championship, but Young left the club on 13 May 2024 after the Binos were relegated back into League Two.

=== Clyde ===
Young returned to management with Scottish League Two club Clyde on 23 October 2024, replacing Ian McCall.

== Career statistics ==
=== Club ===
Appearances and goals by club, season and competition
Club	Season	League			Scottish Cup		League Cup		Europe		Other		Total	
Club	Season	Division	Apps	Goals	Apps	Goals	Apps	Goals	Apps	Goals	Apps	Goals	Apps	Goals
Aberdeen	1996–97	Scottish Premier Division	26	1	2	0	2	0	4	1	–		34	2
Aberdeen	1997–98	Scottish Premier Division	5	0	0	0	1	0	0	0	–		6	0
Aberdeen	1998–99	Scottish Premier League	11	0	0	0	0	0	0	0	–		11	0
Aberdeen	1999–00	Scottish Premier League	3	0	1	0	0	0	0	0	–		4	0
Aberdeen	2000–01	Scottish Premier League	31	1	3	0	1	0	2	0	–		37	1
Aberdeen	2001–02	Scottish Premier League	32	1	3	0	2	0	0	0	–		37	1
Aberdeen	2002–03	Scottish Premier League	24	1	0	0	2	0	4	0	–		30	1
Aberdeen	Total		132	4	9	0	8	0	10	1	0	0	159	5
Dunfermline Athletic	2003-04	Scottish Premier League	32	1	5	1	2	1	0	0	–		39	3
Dunfermline Athletic	2004-05	Scottish Premier League	35	3	3	0	1	0	2	0	–		41	3
Dunfermline Athletic	2005-06	Scottish Premier League	21	2	1	0	3	1	0	0	–		25	3
Dunfermline Athletic	2006-07	Scottish Premier League	21	2	3	0	2	0	0	0	–		26	2
Dunfermline Athletic	2007-08	Scottish First Division	15	0	0	0	1	0	2	0	2	0	20	0
Dunfermline Athletic	Total		124	8	12	1	9	2	4	0	2	0	151	11
Dundee	2008-09	Scottish First Division	8	2	0	0	0	0	–		–		8	2
Dundee	2009-10	Scottish First Division	5	0	1	0	0	0	–		1	0	7	0
Dundee	Total		13	2	1	0	0	0	0	0	1	0	15	2
Queen of the South (trial)	2010-11	Scottish First Division	2	0	0	0	0	0	–		–		2	0
Greenock Morton	2010-11	Scottish First Division	13	1	0	0	0	0	–		–		14	0
Greenock Morton	2011-12	Scottish First Division	1	0	0	0	0	0	–		–		1	0
Greenock Morton	Total		14	1	0	0	0	0	0	0	0	0	15	0
Alloa Athletic	2011-12	Scottish Third Division	32	2	1	0	0	0	–		1	0	34	2
Alloa Athletic	2012-13	Scottish Second Division	21	0	1	0	1	0	–		5	-	28	0
Alloa Athletic	2013-14	Scottish Championship	17	0	2	0	1	0	–		–		20	0
Alloa Athletic	Total		71	2	4	0	2	0	0	0	6	0	83	2
Albion Rovers	2014-15	Scottish League Two	19	1	1	1	1	0	–		1	0	22	2
Albion Rovers	2015-16	Scottish League One	12	1	0	0	0	0	–		1	0	13	1
Albion Rovers	2016-17	Scottish League One	0	0	0	0	0	0	–		2	0	2	0
Albion Rovers	Total		21	2	1	1	1	0	0	0	4	0	27	3
East Fife	2017-18	Scottish League One	0	0	0	0	1	0	–		–		1	0
Career total			377	19	27	2	21	2	14	1	13	0	453	23

=== Managerial record ===
As of match played 14 November 2026

Team	From	To	Record				
Team	From	To	G	W	D	L	Win %
Albion Rovers	10 June 2014	6 May 2017	124	49	29	46	39.52
East Fife	3 June 2017	30 November 2021	173	63	28	82	36.42
Stirling Albion	20 December 2021	13 May 2024	107	39	31	37	36.45
Clyde	23 October 2024	present	103	42	28	33	40.78
Total			507	193	116	198	38.07

== Honours and achievements ==
=== Player ===
Alloa Athletic

- Scottish Third Division: 2011–12

=== Manager ===
Albion Rovers

- Scottish League Two: 2014–15

Stirling Albion

- Scottish League Two: 2022-23

=== Individual ===
- Albion Rovers
  - SPFL League One Manager of the Month (1): October 2015
  - SPFL League Two Manager of the Month (1): November 2014
