= 2003–04 Scottish Cup =

2003–04 Tennent's Scottish Cup
Tournament details
- Country: Scotland

Final positions
- Champions: Celtic
- Runners-up: Dunfermline Athletic

Tournament statistics
- Matches played: 60
- Top goal scorer: Henrik Larsson (5)

The 2003–04 Scottish Cup was the 119th staging of Scotland's most prestigious football knockout competition, also known for sponsorship reasons as the Tennent's Scottish Cup. The Cup was won by Celtic who defeated Dunfermline Athletic in the final. The final was Henrik Larsson's last competitive match for Celtic. The Final also proved to be Dunfermline manager Jimmy Calderwood's last match as manager of the Fife club.

== First round ==
Home team	Score	Away team
Clachnacuddin	0 – 2	Stranraer
Cowdenbeath	5 – 2	Edinburgh City
Elgin City	1 – 2	Peterhead
Forfar Athletic	1 – 1	East Fife
Gretna	4 – 0	Dumbarton
Montrose	1 – 1	Albion Rovers
Spartans	6 – 1	Buckie Thistle
Stirling Albion	3 – 1	Queen's Park

=== Replays ===
Home team	Score	Away team
Albion Rovers	1 – 3	Montrose
East Fife	3 – 3 (4 – 1 pen.)	Forfar Athletic

== Second round ==
Home team	Score	Away team
Alloa Athletic	3 – 3	Spartans
Berwick Rangers	4 – 2	Huntly
East Stirlingshire	0 – 5	Cowdenbeath
Greenock Morton	4 – 0	Vale of Leithen
Gretna	5 – 1	Stenhousemuir
Inverurie Loco Works	1 – 5	Airdrie United
Montrose	1 – 0	Threave Rovers
Peterhead	0 – 2	East Fife
Stranraer	0 – 1	Hamilton Academical
Stirling Albion	1 – 2	Arbroath

=== Replay ===
Home team	Score	Away team
Spartans	5 – 3	Alloa Athletic

== Third round ==
Home team	Score	Away team
Aberdeen	0 – 0	Dundee
Arbroath	1 – 4	Spartans
Ayr United	1 – 2	Falkirk
Celtic	2 – 0	Ross County
Clyde	3 – 0	Gretna
Dunfermline Athletic	3 – 1	Dundee United
East Fife	0 – 1	Queen of the South
Hamilton Academical	2 – 0	Cowdenbeath
Hearts	2 – 0	Berwick Rangers
Hibernian	0 – 2	Rangers
Inverness CT	5 – 1	Brechin City
Livingston	1 – 0	Montrose
Greenock Morton	0 – 3	Partick Thistle
Raith Rovers	1 – 3	Kilmarnock
St Johnstone	0 – 3	Motherwell
St Mirren	2 – 0	Airdrie United

=== Replays ===
Home team	Score	Away team
Dundee	2 – 3	Aberdeen

== Fourth round ==
Home team	Score	Away team
Clyde	0 – 3	Dunfermline Athletic
Falkirk	0 – 2	Aberdeen
Hearts	0 – 3	Celtic
Kilmarnock	0 – 2	Rangers
Motherwell	3 – 2	Queen of the South
Partick Thistle	5 – 1	Hamilton Academical
Spartans	0 – 4	Livingston
St Mirren	0 – 1	Inverness CT

== Quarter-finals ==
6 March 2004

Aberdeen	1–1	Livingston

Pittodrie Stadium, Aberdeen

6 March 2004

Motherwell	0–1	Inverness CT

Fir Park, Motherwell

6 March 2004

Partick Thistle	0–3	Dunfermline Athletic

Firhill Stadium, Glasgow

7 March 2004

Celtic	1–0	Rangers

Celtic Park, Glasgow

=== Replay ===
18 March 2004

Livingston	1–0	Aberdeen

Almondvale Stadium, Livingston

== Semi-finals ==
10 April 2004

Inverness CT	1–1	Dunfermline Athletic
Ritchie 45'	Report	Brewster 67'

Hampden Park, Glasgow
Attendance: 13,255
Referee: Hugh Dallas

11 April 2004

Livingston	1–3	Celtic
McMenamin 79'	Report	Sutton 37', 65'; Larsson 50'

Hampden Park, Glasgow
Attendance: 26,152
Referee: Kenny Clark

=== Replay ===
20 April 2004

Dunfermline Athletic	3–2	Inverness CT
Young 25'; Brewster 63'; Nicholson 78'	Report	Ritchie 7'; Bingham 90' (pen.)

Pittodrie, Aberdeen
Attendance: 5,728
Referee: Hugh Dallas

== Final ==
22 May 2004
15:00

Dunfermline Athletic	1–3	Celtic
Skerla 40'	Report	Larsson 58', 71'; Petrov 84'

Hampden Park, Glasgow
Attendance: 50,846
Referee: Stuart Dougal

== Largest Wins ==
A list of the largest wins from the competition.

Score	Home team	Away team	Stage
6-1	Spartans	Buckie Thistle	First Round
0-5	East Stirlingshire	Cowdenbeath	Second Round
5-1	Gretna	Stenhousemuir	Second Round
5-1	Inverness Caledonian Thistle	Brechin City	Third Round
5-1	Partick Thistle	Hamilton Academical	Fourth Round
1-5	Inverurie Loco Works	Airdrie United	Second Round
