= 2004 Scottish Cup final =

2004 Scottish Cup Final
- Event: 2003–04 Scottish Cup
Dunfermline Athletic	Celtic
1	3
- Date: 22 May 2004
- Venue: Hampden Park, Glasgow
- Man of the Match: Henrik Larsson
- Referee: Stuart Dougal
- Attendance: 50,846

The 2004 Scottish Cup Final was played on 22 May 2004 at Hampden Park in Glasgow and was the final of the 118th Scottish Cup. The final was contested by Dunfermline Athletic and Celtic. Celtic came from behind to win the match 3–1. It was the last game of Henrik Larsson's Celtic career.

== Match details ==
22 May 2004
15:00

Dunfermline Athletic	1–3	Celtic
Skerla 40'	Report	Larsson 58', 71'; Petrov 84'

Hampden Park, Glasgow
Attendance: 50,846
Referee: Stuart Dougal

DUNFERMLINE ATHLETIC:
GK	20	(Scotland) Derek Stillie
DF	18	(Republic of Ireland) Richie Byrne		(substituted off) 88'
DF	5	(Lithuania) Andrius Skerla
DF	4	(Scotland) Darren Young	Booked
DF	28	(England) Aaron Labonte
MF	8	(Scotland) Gary Mason		(substituted off) 82'
MF	7	(Scotland) Barry Nicholson (c)
MF	12	(Republic of Ireland) Gary Dempsey		(substituted off) 60'
MF	11	(Scotland) Derek Young
FW	10	(Scotland) Craig Brewster	Booked
FW	9	(Scotland) Stephen Crawford
Substitutes:
GK	30	(Scotland) Scott Y. Thomson
DF	32	(Scotland) Andy Tod		(substituted on) 88'
DF	22	(France) David Grondin		(substituted on) 82'
MF	2	(Scotland) Lee Bullen		(substituted on) 60'
FW	31	(Republic of Ireland) Billy Mehmet
Manager:
(Scotland) Jimmy Calderwood

CELTIC:
GK	22	(Scotland) David Marshall
DF	17	(France) Didier Agathe
DF	4	(Scotland) Jackie McNamara (c)
DF	23	(Slovakia) Stanislav Varga
DF	6	(Guinea) Bobo Baldé
MF	18	(Northern Ireland) Neil Lennon	Booked
MF	19	(Bulgaria) Stiliyan Petrov
MF	11	(Scotland) Stephen Pearson		(substituted off) 58'
MF	8	(England) Alan Thompson
CF	7	(Sweden) Henrik Larsson
CF	9	(England) Chris Sutton
Substitutes:
GK	47	(Northern Ireland) Michael McGovern
DF	35	(Sweden) Johan Mjällby
MF	14	(Scotland) Paul Lambert
MF	33	(Scotland) Ross Wallace		(substituted on) 58'
FW	37	(Scotland) Craig Beattie
Manager:
(Northern Ireland) Martin O'Neill
