= 2007 Scottish Cup final =

2007 Scottish Cup Final
- Event: 2006–07 Scottish Cup
Celtic	Dunfermline Athletic
1	0
- Date: 26 May 2007
- Venue: Hampden Park, Glasgow
- Man of the Match: Souleymane Bamba
- Referee: Kenny Clark

The 2007 Scottish Cup Final was played on 26 May 2007 at Hampden Park in Glasgow and was the final of the 121st Scottish Cup. The final was contested by Celtic, who beat St Johnstone 2–1 in the semi-final, and Dunfermline Athletic, who beat Hibernian 1–0 in a replay, after the first match had ended 0–0.

Celtic had reached the final 53 times and won on 34 of those occasions, Dunfermline had reached the final only 5 times, winning twice, the previous time being 1968. The two sides had last met in a Scottish Cup Final in the 2003–04 Scottish Cup with Celtic winning 3–1 on that occasion. In total they had met each other 4 times in cup finals (Celtic winning 3), the most recent being when Celtic won 3–0 in the 2006 League Cup Final.

The cup holders were Hearts, who had beaten Gretna 4–2 in a Penalty shootout in the 2006 Final. Hearts were knocked out in the Fourth Round by Dunfermline Athletic, who beat them 1–0. Celtic won the final 1–0 thanks to a late Jean-Joël Perrier-Doumbé goal.

== Match details ==
26 May 2007
15:00

Celtic	1–0	Dunfermline Athletic
Perrier-Doumbé 84'	Report

Hampden Park, Glasgow
Attendance: 49,600
Referee: Kenny Clark

Celtic	Dunfermline Athletic

CELTIC :
GK	1	(Poland) Artur Boruc
RB	24	(Cameroon) Jean-Joël Perrier-Doumbé	(yellow card) 36'
CB	44	(Scotland) Stephen McManus
CB	17	(Scotland) Steven Pressley	(yellow card) 56'
LB	3	(England) Lee Naylor
RM	25	(Japan) Shunsuke Nakamura
CM	18	(Northern Ireland) Neil Lennon (c)		(substituted off) 66'
CM	11	(Scotland) Paul Hartley
LM	46	(Republic of Ireland) Aiden McGeady	(yellow card) 32'
CF	9	(Scotland) Kenny Miller		(substituted off) 56'
CF	10	(Netherlands) Jan Vennegoor of Hesselink
Substitutes:
GK	47	(Northern Ireland) Michael McGovern
DF	5	(Scotland) Gary Caldwell		(substituted on) 66'
MF	56	(Iceland) Teddy Bjarnason
FW	37	(Scotland) Craig Beattie		(substituted on) 56'
FW	14	(Scotland) Derek Riordan
Manager:
(Scotland) Gordon Strachan

DUNFERMLINE ATHLETIC:
GK	29	(Netherlands) Dorus de Vries
RB	2	(Scotland) Greg Shields (c)
CB	3	(Scotland) Scott Wilson
CB	24	(Ivory Coast) Souleymane Bamba
LB	11	(Scotland) Scott Muirhead
RM	12	(Scotland) Scott Morrison		(substituted off) 72'
CM	4	(Scotland) Darren Young
CM	5	(Scotland) Jamie McCunnie
LM	16	(England) Adam Hammill
CF	9	(Scotland) Mark Burchill	(yellow card) 36'	(substituted off) 89'
CF	10	(Scotland) Jim McIntyre		(substituted off) 80'
Substitutes:
GK	1	(Scotland) Roddy McKenzie
DF	14	(Scotland) Phillip McGuire
MF	19	(Scotland) Iain Williamson		(substituted on) 89'
FW	20	(Scotland) Jim Hamilton		(substituted on) 80'
FW	25	(Scotland) Stephen Crawford		(substituted on) 72'
Manager:
(Republic of Ireland) Stephen Kenny

== Road to the final ==
Celtic				Round	Dunfermline Athletic			
Home team	Score	Away team	Celtic scorers	Round	Home team	Score	Away team	Dunfermline scorers
Celtic	4 – 0	Dumbarton	Zurawski 3', 9'; Vennegoor of Hesselink 43'; Riordan 69'	Round Three	Dunfermline Athletic	3 – 2	Rangers	Hamilton 17'; Simmons 29'; McGuire 46'
Livingston	1 – 4	Celtic	Darren O'Dea 30'; Riordan 45', 59'; Vennegoor of Hesselink 61'	Round Four	Dunfermline Athletic	1 – 0	Hearts	Wilson 90'
Inverness CT	1 – 2	Celtic	Pressley 89'; Miller 90+1'	Quarter-finals	Dunfermline Athletic	2 – 0	Partick Thistle	Simmons 4', 86'
St Johnstone	1 – 2	Celtic	Vennegoor of Hesselink 13' (pen.), 54'	Semi-finals	Hibernian	0 – 0	Dunfermline Athletic	
St Johnstone	1 – 2	Celtic	Vennegoor of Hesselink 13' (pen.), 54'	Replay	Dunfermline Athletic	1 – 0	Hibernian	Jim McIntyre 88'
