= Derek Young =

Scottish footballer

Personal information
- Full name: Derek Young
- Date of birth: 27 May 1980 (age 46)
- Place of birth: Glasgow, Scotland
- Height: 5 ft 8 in (1.73 m)
- Position: Midfielder

Youth career
- Cathkin United
- 1995–1997: Aberdeen

Senior career*
Years	Team	Apps	(Gls)
1996–2003	Aberdeen	111	(13)
1996	→ Lewis United (loan)		
2003–2006	Dunfermline Athletic	63	(9)
2006	St Johnstone	1	(0)
2006–2007	Partick Thistle	28	(5)
2007–2011	Aberdeen	95	(6)
2011	Grindavík	5	(0)
2011–2012	Greenock Morton	19	(1)
2012–2014	Queen of the South	45	(2)
2014–2016	Forfar Athletic	28	(2)
2016–2017	Formartine United	–	(–)

International career
1997–2001	Scotland U21	6	(0)
- * Club domestic league appearances and goals as of 11:37, 23 October 2015 (UTC)

Derek Young (born 27 May 1980) is a Scottish ex-professional association football midfielder. Young started his career alongside his brother Darren at Aberdeen before leaving with him in 2003 to join Dunfermline Athletic. Spells at St Johnstone and Partick Thistle followed before returning to Aberdeen for another four years. He spent a short spell in Iceland with Grindavík before returning to Scotland with Morton in 2011. In summer 2012 he joined Queen of the South with whom he won a league and cup double. He joined Forfar Athletic in 2014 before ending his playing career with a season at Formartine United.

== Career ==
Young grew up in Whitlawburn, Cambuslang and attended Cathkin High School. He started his career with Aberdeen where without winning any trophies, he played in numerous UEFA Cup games including a tie against Hertha Berlin. He also represented Scotland under 21s.

He then joined Dunfermline Athletic where he was part of the club's best times since the days of George Farm in the late 1960s. Young played in a Scottish Cup Final defeat against Celtic in 2004(alongside his brother Darren), and in a loss to the same opponents in the 2006 Scottish League Cup Final. He was then briefly at St Johnstone before spending most of the 2006–07 season playing for Partick Thistle.

Young rejoined Aberdeen in July 2007. Like his first spell there, he again tasted UEFA competition against the likes of Atlético Madrid. In April 2011, he was told by Aberdeen manager Craig Brown that his contract would not be renewed for the following season. In July 2011, he signed for Icelandic club Grindavík.

After leaving Grindavik, Young was offered a contract until the end of 2011 by Greenock Morton, but was unable to play against Livingston due to a suspension that only was brought to light when Morton received international clearance from the Icelandic FA. His signing was confirmed in November along with the loan signing of Dominic Cervi. In January 2012, Young was offered a contract extension by Allan Moore until the end of the season; the contract offer was accepted and signed on 6 January. Young was released by Morton at the end of the 2011–12 season due to difficulties travelling over from Aberdeen for training.

Young signed for Queen of the South during the 2012 summer transfer window. Young scored for Queen of the South in their 4–3 penalty shootout win against Rangers at Ibrox. and did the same when Queens won the 2013 Scottish Challenge Cup Final that season against Partick. Having already won the 2012–13 Scottish Second Division title by a large margin, this gave Young and his teammates a league and cup double.

Young moved to Forfar Athletic in June 2014, spending two seasons with the Station Park club before signing for Highland League club Formartine United in July 2016.

== Career statistics ==
=== Club ===
Appearances and goals by club, season and competition
Club	Season	League			National Cup		League Cup		Europe		Other		Total	
Club	Season	Division	Apps	Goals	Apps	Goals	Apps	Goals	Apps	Goals	Apps	Goals	Apps	Goals
Aberdeen	1996–97	Scottish Premier Division	0	0	0	0	0	0	0	0	—		0	0
Aberdeen	1997–98	Scottish Premier Division	0	0	0	0	0	0	0	0	—		0	0
Aberdeen	1998–99	SPL	4	0	0	0	1	0	0	0	—		5	0
Aberdeen	1999–00	SPL	14	0	0	0	2	0	0	0	—		16	0
Aberdeen	2000–01	SPL	31	6	3	0	1	1	1	0	—		36	7
Aberdeen	2001–02	SPL	32	3	3	1	1	0	0	0	—		36	4
Aberdeen	2002–03	SPL	29	4	3	1	2	0	4	0	—		38	5
Aberdeen	Total		110	13	9	2	7	1	5	0	0	0	131	16
Dunfermline Athletic	2003–04	SPL	28	4	5	0	0	0	0	0	—		33	4
Dunfermline Athletic	2004–05	SPL	17	4	0	0	1	0	0	0	—		18	5
Dunfermline Athletic	2005–06	SPL	18	1	1	1	4	3	0	0	—		23	5
Dunfermline Athletic	Total		63	9	6	1	5	3	0	0	0	0	74	14
St Johnstone	2006–07	Scottish First Division	1	0	0	0	2	0	—		—		3	0
Partick Thistle	2006–07	Scottish First Division	28	5	3	0	0	0	—		—		31	5
Aberdeen	2007–08	SPL	24	2	4	0	3	1	5	0	—		36	3
Aberdeen	2008–09	SPL	22	1	2	0	2	0	0	0	—		26	1
Aberdeen	2009–10	SPL	20	3	3	0	0	0	1	0	—		24	3
Aberdeen	2010–11	SPL	29	0	4	0	3	0	0	0	—		36	0
Aberdeen	Total		95	6	13	0	8	1	6	0	0	0	122	7
Grindavík	2011–12	Úrvalsdeild	5	0	0	0	0	0	0	0	—		5+	0+
Greenock Morton	2011–12	Scottish First Division	18	1	3	0	0	0	—		—		21	1
Queen of the South	2012–13	Scottish Second Division	26	2	1	0	3	0	—		—		30	2
Queen of the South	2013–14	Scottish Championship	16	0	1	0	2	0	—		2	0	21	0
Queen of the South	Total		42	2	2	0	5	0	0	0	2	0	51	2
Forfar Athletic	2014–15	Scottish League One	21	1	0	0	1	0	–	–	4	0	26	1
Forfar Athletic	2015–16	Scottish League One	24	1	4	0	1	1	–	–	—		29	2
Forfar Athletic	Total		45	2	4	0	1	1	0	0	0	0	55	3
Formantine United	2016–17	Highland League	0	0	3	1	0	0	–	–	—		3	1
Career total			407	38	43	4	28	6	11	0	6	0	496+	48+

== Honours ==
Queen of the South

- Scottish Division Two Champions: 2012–13
- Scottish Challenge Cup Winners: 2012–13
