= Paul Hampshire =

Scottish footballer (1981–2022)

Personal information
- Date of birth: 20 September 1981
- Place of birth: Edinburgh, Scotland
- Date of death: 13 March 2022 (aged 40)
- Place of death: near Dunbar, Scotland
- Position: Midfielder

Senior career*
Years	Team	Apps	(Gls)
1999–2003	Raith Rovers	51	(0)
2003–2005	Berwick Rangers	54	(4)
2005–2007	East Fife	47	(5)
2008–2009	Dunbar United		
2009–?	Newquay		
- * Club domestic league appearances and goals

Paul Hampshire (20 September 1981 – 13 March 2022) was a Scottish professional footballer.

== Career ==
Hampshire started his career with Raith Rovers before signing for Berwick Rangers. He then moved to East Fife in 2005 before finding his way to junior football with Dunbar. Hampshire then moved to Cornwall, signing for Newquay.

== Personal life ==
Hampshire was killed after being hit by a motorist on the A1 near Dunbar on 13 March 2022, at the age of 40. His older brother Steven also played professional football.
