= David Moss (footballer, born 1968) =

English footballer

David Moss (born 15 November 1968) is an English former footballer, who played for Boston United, Doncaster Rovers, Chesterfield, Scunthorpe United, Partick Thistle, Falkirk, Dunfermline, Ayr United and Swansea City.

Moss ran a car insurance business while playing for Falkirk. Since retiring as a player, Moss has worked as a scout for Swansea City, Crystal Palace and Celtic.

On 1 June 2017, he joined newly promoted Premier League team Huddersfield Town as Head of Football Operations but left 5 months later, after leaving Celtic.
