= Greg Shields =

Scottish footballer and coach

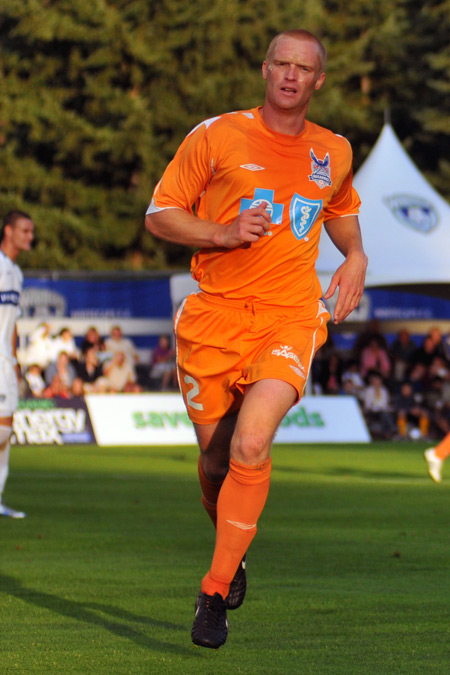

Personal information
- Full name: Greg Shields
- Date of birth: 21 August 1976 (age 50)
- Place of birth: Falkirk, Scotland
- Position: Defender

Team information
- Current team: Dunfermline Athletic (head of academy – football)

Youth career
- Gairdoch United
- –1995: Rangers

Senior career*
Years	Team	Apps	(Gls)
1995–1997	Rangers	7	(0)
1997–1999	Dunfermline Athletic	75	(0)
1999–2002	Charlton Athletic	25	(2)
2002	→ Walsall (loan)	7	(0)
2002	→ Kilmarnock (loan)	5	(0)
2002–2004	Kilmarnock	53	(2)
2004–2009	Dunfermline Athletic	129	(4)
2009–2010	Carolina RailHawks	11	(0)
2010	→ Partick Thistle (loan)	5	(0)
2010–2013	Carolina RailHawks	33	(0)
Total		350	(8)

International career
1996	Scotland U21	2	(0)
2003	Scotland B	1	(0)

Managerial career
- 2013–2019: North Carolina FC (assistant)
- 2019–2022: Dunfermline Athletic (assistant)
- 2021: Dunfermline Athletic (interim manager)
- 2022–2024: Dunfermline Athletic (head of academy – football)
- 2024–: St Andrews United
- * Club domestic league appearances and goals

Greg Shields (born 21 August 1976) is a Scottish football player and coach, who is currently head of academy – football with Dunfermline Athletic. His playing career was most closely associated with Dunfermline Athletic, as he played for the club over 200 times across two spells and was their captain in two national cup finals. Shields also played for Rangers, Charlton Athletic, Walsall, Kilmarnock, Partick Thistle and the Carolina RailHawks. He represented Scotland in under-21 and B internationals.

== Playing career ==
=== Early career ===
Shields started his career with Gairdoch United Boys Club before joining the youth system at Rangers. One of his first senior appearances was in October 1996 in a UEFA Champions League tie against Ajax. He went on to play only 11 times for the Glasgow club before a £200,000 move to Dunfermline Athletic in 1997.

=== England and Scotland ===
After 86 consecutive appearances for Dunfermline he swapped west Fife for south London in a £600,000 move to Alan Curbishley's Charlton Athletic in 1999. After an impressive start at The Valley, Shields ran into some injury problems which eventually ruined his Charlton career.

After a brief spell on loan at Walsall, Jim Jefferies brought him back home to Scotland at SPL side Kilmarnock, initially on loan then permanently. He quickly established himself in the Rugby Park side, becoming captain in season 2002–03. This alerted his former employers Dunfermline Athletic, who swooped to take him back to East End Park during the January 2004 transfer window (coincidentally, both his goals for Killie were scored against Dunfermline and they were also the last opponent he faced while at the Ayrshire club).

Dunfermline played in the final of the Scottish Cup that season but Shields was cup-tied after playing in an earlier round for Kilmarnock. Injury again wrecked most of the 2004–05 season for him. He captained the "Pars" in the 2006 Scottish League Cup Final and the 2007 Scottish Cup Final, both of which ended in defeat to Celtic; his defensive colleagues included former Rangers youth teammate Scott Wilson.

=== United States ===
On 26 May 2009, Shields was poised to join Carolina RailHawks in the United States, managed by Scotsman Martin Rennie. Carolina RailHawks announced on 16 July 2009 that they had signed Shields. He had a loan spell back in Scotland with Partick Thistle before returning to RailHawks where he finished his playing career in 2013.

== Coaching career ==
Shields worked as an assistant coach with the RailHawks, as well as being a head coach with Capital Area RailHawks, Carolina RailHawks' academy programme. He was appointed assistant head coach at Dunfermline Athletic in January 2019. After Peter Grant's tenure as Dunfermline manager ended, Shields and Steven Whittaker were appointed joint interim managers of the club. Shields and Whittaker were in charge for two matches, before John Hughes was appointed on a permanent basis.

The creation of Dunfermline's new youth academy as well as the change to the management team following relegation to League 1 saw Shields promoted to head of academy – football, working alongside Bill Hendry as head of academy – operations.

== Managerial statistics ==
As of match played on 13 November 2021

Managerial record by team and tenure
Team	From	To	Record				
Team	From	To	P	W	D	L	Win %
Dunfermline Athletic (Note: Joint caretaker manager with Steven Whittaker)	31 October 2021	15 November 2021	2	1	0	1	50.0
Total			550	218	123	209	39.6

== Honours ==
Charlton Athletic

- Football League First Division: 1999–2000
