= Andy Reilly (footballer, born 1985) =

Scottish footballer

Personal information
- Full name: Andrew Reilly
- Date of birth: 26 October 1985 (age 40)
- Place of birth: Luton, England
- Height: 1.78 m (5 ft 10 in)
- Position: Midfielder

Senior career*
Years	Team	Apps	(Gls)
2003–2004	Wycombe Wanderers	5	(0)
2004–2005	Barnet	0	(0)

International career
2004	Scotland U21	1	(0)
- * Club domestic league appearances and goals

Andrew Reilly (born 26 October 1985 in Luton) is a former professional footballer who played in The Football League for Wycombe Wanderers.

Reilly was selected by the Scotland national under-21 football team in 2004.
