= Barry Nicholson =

Scottish footballer (born 1978)

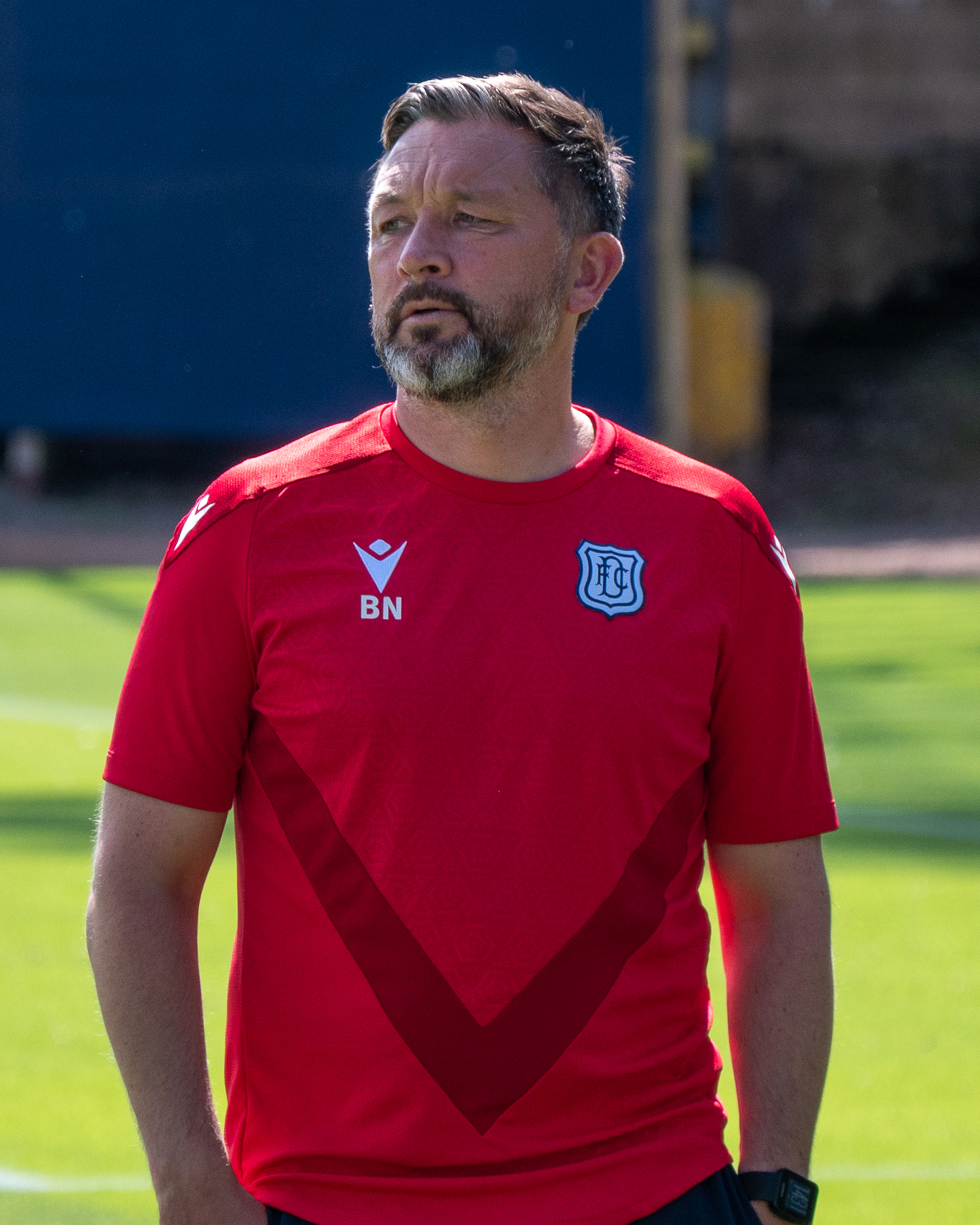
- Nicholson during a Dundee warmup in 2025

Personal information
- Full name: Barry Nicholson
- Date of birth: 24 August 1978 (age 48)
- Place of birth: Dumfries, Scotland
- Height: 1.73 m (5 ft 8 in)
- Position: Attacking midfielder

Team information
- Current team: Dundee (assistant head coach)

Youth career
- Maxwelltown Thistle
- 1992–1996: Rangers

Senior career*
Years	Team	Apps	(Gls)
1995–2000	Rangers	7	(0)
2000–2005	Dunfermline Athletic	174	(21)
2005–2008	Aberdeen	102	(13)
2008–2012	Preston North End	93	(9)
2012–2013	Fleetwood Town	30	(2)
2013–2014	Kilmarnock	23	(2)
Total		429	(47)

International career
2001–2004	Scotland	3	(0)
- * Club domestic league appearances and goals

Barry Nicholson (born 24 August 1978) is a Scottish former professional footballer who played as a midfielder. He is currently the assistant head coach of Scottish Premiership club Dundee.

He started his professional career with Rangers and went on to play over 100 games for each of Dunfermline Athletic, Aberdeen and Preston North End. He then played for Fleetwood Town before finishing his career at Kilmarnock. Nicholson earned three full caps for Scotland, all won during his time with Dunfermline.

== Club career ==
=== Early years ===
Born in Dumfries, Nicholson watched matches of hometown club Queen of the South with his father. From playing youth football in Dumfries, he then joined Rangers. Limited appearances in Rangers' first team over several years saw him move on in 2000. Some records show that he scored once for Rangers in a UEFA Champions League qualifier against FC Haka in 1999, but Nicholson has stated that the goal should be credited to Jonatan Johansson.

=== Dunfermline Athletic ===
Nicholson joined Dunfermline Athletic under the helm of Jimmy Calderwood and was a first team regular in what was the Pars' most successful period since the George Farm era. 2002–03 saw them finish 5th, and the following season they finished fourth as well as reaching the 2004 Scottish Cup Final, qualifying for a UEFA competition for the first time since 1970.

=== Aberdeen ===
Nicholson's performances at East End Park saw him signed by Aberdeen for a fee of £250,000 in July 2005 and re-joined former boss Calderwood who had since moved to Pittodrie. The move paid dividends as his strong performances towards the end of the 2006–07 season saw him score vital goals. The most notable of these was the last minute equaliser against Hearts which all but clinched third place for Aberdeen, with only two matches of the season left at that stage.

The Dons qualified from their group in the 2007–08 UEFA Cup after a 4–0 win against F.C. Copenhagen. They were twice ahead in the next round at home against Bayern Munich before drawing 2–2. The Bavarians won the return leg comfortably. In October 2007, Nicholson scored the first hat-trick of his career by scoring three goals against Inverness Caledonian Thistle in the quarterfinals of the League Cup, with two of the goals being penalties. Nicholson scored the second goal for Aberdeen against hometown club Queen of the South in the 2007–08 Scottish Cup semifinals. Queens won the 7-goal game 4–3 to make it to the final for the first time in their history. He later said, "I think that they were the better team and deserved to go through."

=== Preston North End ===
On 30 June 2008, Nicholson signed a two-year contract with an option of a third year on a free transfer for Preston North End, subject to passing a medical.

Nicholson scored his first goal for Preston in a 2–0 preseason friendly away to Chorley. On 22 August 2009, he sustained a suspected broken leg in the Championship game versus Peterborough United. Nicholson returned from injury for the final game of the 2009-10 season only to limp off the field within 15 minutes suffering from an injury to the same leg. Nicholson returned to the side in January 2011 playing regularly for the remainder of the season. He was released by Preston at the end of the 2011-12 season.

=== Later career ===
Nicholson signed for Fleetwood Town for the 2012–13 season. He then moved to Kilmarnock in August 2013 on a short-term contract. On 24 August 2014, he scored his first goal for the club in a 2–1 defeat against Hibernian. In January 2014, Nicholson's contract was extended until the end of the season.

At the end of the 2013–14 season, Nicholson retired from playing and became the development manager at Fleetwood Town.

== International career ==
Nicholson won three caps for Scotland, the first being in the friendly draw with Poland in April 2001; the last was in the friendly defeat to Sweden in November 2004.

== Career statistics ==
=== Club ===
Appearances and goals by club, season and competition
Club	Season	League			National Cup		League Cup		Europe		Other		Total	
Club	Season	Division	Apps	Goals	Apps	Goals	Apps	Goals	Apps	Goals	Apps	Goals	Apps	Goals
Rangers	1998–99	SPL	5	0	0	0	0	0	0	0	-	-	5	0
Rangers	1999–00	SPL	2	0	0	0	1	0	2	1	-	-	5	1
Rangers	Total		7	0	0	0	1	0	2	1	-	-	10	1
Dunfermline Athletic	2000–01	SPL	36	3	4	1	3	1	0	0	-	-	43	5
Dunfermline Athletic	2001–02	SPL	37	7	2	0	2	1	0	0	-	-	41	8
Dunfermline Athletic	2002–03	SPL	38	4	6	1	3	0	0	0	-	-	47	5
Dunfermline Athletic	2003–04	SPL	36	5	6	4	2	0	0	0	-	-	44	9
Dunfermline Athletic	2004–05	SPL	27	2	3	0	2	0	1	0	-	-	33	2
Dunfermline Athletic	Total		174	21	21	6	12	2	1	0	-	-	208	29
Aberdeen	2005–06	SPL	33	2	2	1	3	1	0	0	-	-	38	4
Aberdeen	2006–07	SPL	31	6	2	2	1	0	0	0	-	-	34	8
Aberdeen	2007–08	SPL	38	5	5	1	3	3	7	0	-	-	53	9
Aberdeen	Total		102	13	9	4	7	4	7	0	-	-	125	21
Preston North End	2008–09	Championship	37	3	1	0	1	0	-	-	2	0	41	3
Preston North End	2009–10	Championship	4	0	0	0	1	1	-	-	0	0	5	1
Preston North End	2010–11	Championship	22	4	1	0	0	0	-	-	0	0	23	4
Preston North End	2011–12	League One	30	2	2	0	1	0	-	-	1	0	34	2
Preston North End	Total		93	9	4	0	3	1	-	-	3	0	103	10
Fleetwood Town	2012–13	League Two	30	2	1	0	1	0	-	-	1	0	33	2
Kilmarnock	2013–14	Scottish Premiership	23	2	0	0	0	0	0	0	-	-	23	2
Career total			429	47	35	10	24	7	10	1	4	0	502	65

=== International ===
Appearances and goals by national team and year
National team	Year	Apps	Goals
Scotland	2001	2	0
Scotland	2002	—	
Scotland	2003	—	
Scotland	2004	1	0
Total		3	0

== Honours ==
- Dunfermline Athletic – 2004 Scottish Cup Finalist
