= 2006 Scottish League Cup final =

- Event: 2005–06 Scottish League Cup
Dunfermline Athletic	Celtic
0	3
- Date: 19 March 2006
- Venue: Hampden Park, Glasgow
- Referee: Stuart Dougal
- Attendance: 50,090

The 2006 Scottish League Cup final was a football match played on 19 March 2006 at Hampden Park in Glasgow. It was the final match of the 2005–06 Scottish League Cup and the 59th Scottish League Cup final. The final was contested by Dunfermline Athletic and Celtic. Celtic won the match 3–0, thanks to goals from Maciej Zurawski, Shaun Maloney and Dion Dublin.

The Celtic team all wore the number 7 on their shorts in honour of former player Jimmy Johnstone, who had died a week earlier.

== Road to the final ==
Celtic

	Home team	Score	Away team
Round 3	Celtic	2 – 1	Falkirk
Quarter-final	Celtic	2 – 0	Rangers
Semi-final	Motherwell	1 – 2	Celtic

Dunfermline Athletic

	Home team	Score	Away team
Round 2	Gretna	0 – 1	Dunfermline
Round 3	Kilmarnock	3 – 4	Dunfermline
Quarter-final	Dunfermline	3 – 0	Hibernian
Semi-final	Dunfermline	1 – 0	Livingston

== Match details ==
19 March 2006

Dunfermline Athletic	0–3	Celtic
	Report	Żurawski 43'; Maloney 76'; Dublin 90'

Hampden Park, Glasgow
Attendance: 50,090
Referee: Stuart Dougal

Dunfermline Athletic	Celtic

DUNFERMLINE ATHLETIC:
GK	1	(Scotland) Allan McGregor
RB	2	(Scotland) Greg Shields (c)
CB	3	(Scotland) Scott Wilson
CB	19	(England) Aaron Labonte
LB	25	(Scotland) Iain Campbell	(substituted off) 62'
RM	23	(Scotland) Greg Ross	(substituted off) 77'
CM	8	(Scotland) Gary Mason
CM	6	(Scotland) Scott Thomson
LM	26	(France) Frederic Daquin	(substituted off) 84'
AM	10	(England) Lee Makel
CF	9	(Scotland) Mark Burchill
Substitutes:
GK	20	(England) Bryn Halliwell
DF	18	(Scotland) Andy Tod
MF	11	(Scotland) Derek Young	(substituted on) 62'
MF	14	(Scotland) Simon Donnelly	(substituted on) 77'
FW	7	(Poland) Bartosz Tarachulski	(substituted on) 84'
Manager:
(Scotland) Jim Leishman

CELTIC :
GK	1	(Poland) Artur Boruc
RB	2	(Scotland) Paul Telfer
CB	44	(Scotland) Stephen McManus
CB	6	(Guinea) Bobo Baldé
LB	33	(Scotland) Ross Wallace
RM	25	(Japan) Shunsuke Nakamura
CM	18	(Northern Ireland) Neil Lennon (c)
CM	16	(Republic of Ireland) Roy Keane	(substituted off) 61'
LM	29	(Scotland) Shaun Maloney
AM	19	(Bulgaria) Stiliyan Petrov
CF	7	(Poland) Maciej Żurawski
Substitutes:
GK	22	(Scotland) David Marshall
DF	23	(Slovakia) Stanislav Varga
MF	11	(Scotland) Stephen Pearson
MF	8	(England) Alan Thompson
FW	9	(England) Dion Dublin	(substituted on) 61'
Manager:
(Scotland) Gordon Strachan
