= Andy Tod =

Scottish footballer (born 1971)

Personal information
- Full name: Andrew Tod
- Date of birth: 4 November 1971 (age 54)
- Place of birth: Dunfermline, Scotland
- Position: Defender

Youth career
- Kelty Hearts

Senior career*
Years	Team	Apps	(Gls)
1993–2001	Dunfermline Athletic	211	(34)
2000	→ Stockport County (loan)	11	(3)
2001	→ Bradford City (loan)	12	(4)
2001–2003	Bradford City	23	(1)
2002	→ Heart of Midlothian (loan)	3	(1)
2003	→ Dundee United (loan)	13	(2)
2003–2007	Dunfermline Athletic	101	(12)
2007–2008	Raith Rovers	22	(2)
2008–2009	→ Forfar Athletic (loan)	6	(0)
2009–2011	Forfar Athletic	67	(1)
Total		469	(60)
- * Club domestic league appearances and goals as of 1 February 2011 ‡ National team caps and goals as of 31 October 2008

Andrew Tod (born 4 November 1971) is a Scottish former professional footballer who played mainly as a defender.

== Career ==
Tod was a versatile player who could play in defence or attack. He started his professional career at hometown club Dunfermline Athletic in 1992. After being a regular goalscorer within Junior football at Kelty Hearts, manager Bert Paton decided to bring the striker to East End Park at the age of 20.

After making over 200 appearances for Dunfermline, he departed in 2001 to join Bradford City for £100,000 after an initial loan spell saw him score four goals in 12 league games, including a double against Wimbledon in October 2001. Due to add-on transfer clauses in his contract, Bradford were later unable to afford to continue playing Tod and he soon returned to Scotland with loan spells at Hearts and Dundee United before returning permanently with former club Dunfermline in 2003, completing another century of appearances though now well into his 30s. He came off the bench in the 2004 Scottish Cup final and was an unused substitute in the 2006 Scottish League Cup final, both of which ended in defeat to Celtic.

During January 2007, Tod was told that he was no longer needed at East End Park by manager Stephen Kenny – he was not involved in the later stages of the club's run to another Scottish Cup final at the end of that season. On 11 July 2007, he moved to Dunfermline's Fife rivals Raith Rovers on a free transfer. Without starting a game for Raith in the 2008–09 season, he was loaned out to team up with his former manager Dick Campbell at Forfar Athletic on 31 October 2008, signing a permanent contract three months later. Tod spent the next two seasons with the Loons before retiring in January 2011 to take up a job as a police officer.

== Personal life ==
His sons Andrew (born 2006) and John (born 2007) are also footballers, both of whom began their careers at Dunfermline and were selected for Scotland at youth levels.
