= Gary Dempsey (Irish footballer) =

Irish footballer (born 1981)

Personal information
- Full name: Gary William Dempsey
- Date of birth: 15 January 1981 (age 45)
- Place of birth: Wexford, Ireland
- Position: Midfielder

Youth career
- 1993–1997: Cherry Orchard
- 1997–2000: Everton

Senior career*
Years	Team	Apps	(Gls)
2000–2001	Bray Wanderers	3	(0)
2001–2002	Waterford United	69	(14)
2002–2005	Dunfermline Athletic	80	(7)
2005–2007	Aberdeen	54	(2)
2007–2008	Yeovil Town	16	(2)
2008–2009	St Patrick's Athletic	61	(4)
2009–2010	Darlington	24	(1)
2010–2011	Bray Wanderers	46	(5)
2012	Waterford United	28	(7)
2013	Bray Wanderers	34	(2)
2014	Shelbourne	12	(1)
Total		427	(45)

International career
1998	Republic of Ireland U17	1	(0)
- * Club domestic league appearances and goals

Gary William Dempsey (born 15 January 1981) is an Irish retired footballer and is currently the manager of Wexford premier league side North End United.

== Career ==
=== Early career ===
After a successful career at Cherry Orchard in 1997 Dempsey signed a 4-year contract with Everton and moved to Merseyside soon after his 16th birthday. He spent 4 years at Everton and was part of the team that won the FA Youth Cup with the likes of Richard Dunne and Francis Jeffers. Dempsey returned to Bray where, over two spells, he scored a total of over 5 goals in 58 total appearances. He moved on to Waterford United where he was awarded the Supporters Player of the Year for the 2001–02 League of Ireland season.

=== Scotland ===
In 2002, he was signed by Scottish side Dunfermline Athletic, where he made 80 league appearances over a three-year period, scoring seven league goals. He scored on his debut against Celtic at Parkhead in front of 60,000 fans. At Dunfermline, Gary soon established himself a regular in the team and won Young Player of the Year in his first season. In his second season, he helped Dunfermline into the 2004 Scottish Cup final against Celtic in what was the great Henrik Larsson's last game. Having lost the final 3–1, Dunfermline secured a place in the 2004–05 UEFA Cup where they lost to Icelandic part timers Fimleikafélag Hafnarfjarðar 4–3 on aggregate with Dempsey scoring in the "home" leg at McDiarmid Park.

Dunfermline manager Jimmy Calderwood left the club to manage Aberdeen in 2004. Soon afterwards, he signed Dempsey on a two-and-a-half-year deal. He said after agreeing to play as an amateur for Aberdeen: "I would rather be on the dole than play for Dunfermline".

Dempsey struggled to hold a place in the Aberdeen first team and he spent time on trial with Doncaster Rovers in January 2006. A move failed to materialise, and his future at Aberdeen looked bleak. But as the 2005–06 season drew to a close, he forced his way back into the first-team picture after a number of fine bit-part performances. On 26 March 2007, Aberdeen announced that he had rejected their final contract offer, and shortly afterwards he signed for Yeovil Town.

=== Later career ===
St Patrick's Athletic announced his signing on 31 January 2008. Gary scored the equaliser away to IF Elfsborg in the UEFA Cup. In November 2008 he was suspended after admitting betting against his own team albeit in a game in which he was not appearing.

He signed for Darlington along with former Shamrock Rovers striker Tadhg Purcell in January 2010. He made his full league debut against Rotherham United which ended in a 2–1 win for his new club. He was released by Darlington following their relegation from League 2, along with 13 other players.

On 30 July 2010, Dempsey signed for former club Bray Wanderers Dempsey was Player of the Month for April 2011 and capped off the season by winning the club's Player of the Year award He then went on to decline a new contract at Bray to sign for Waterford United. He started the league campaign with a 6–0 loss against South-East rivals Wexford Youths, then went on to beat hot favourites for the title Limerick 3–1. In only his third game he went on to score his first for the club where he hit a free-kick from 25 yards, in what was the only goal vs Salthill Devon.

He re-signed for Bray Wanderers on 11 January 2013. In July 2014 Dempsey signed for Shelbourne in the League of Ireland First Division.

== Honours ==
=== Club ===
Everton

- FA Youth Cup (1): 1998

=== Individual ===
- Bray Wanderers Player of the Year (1): 2011
