= Andy Reilly (footballer, born 1986) =

Scottish footballer

Personal information
- Date of birth: 25 May 1986 (age 40)
- Place of birth: Dundee, Scotland
- Position: Midfielder

Senior career*
Years	Team	Apps	(Gls)
2004–2005	Dundee	2	(0)
2005–2009	Arbroath	85	(10)
- Carnoustie Panmure
2010–2011	Linlithgow Rose		
Total		87	(10)
- * Club domestic league appearances and goals

Andy Reilly (born 25 May 1986) is a Scottish former professional footballer who played as a midfielder.

== Career ==
Born in Dundee, Reilly played for Dundee, Arbroath, Carnoustie Panmure and Linlithgow Rose.
