= Gary Mason (footballer) =

Scottish footballer

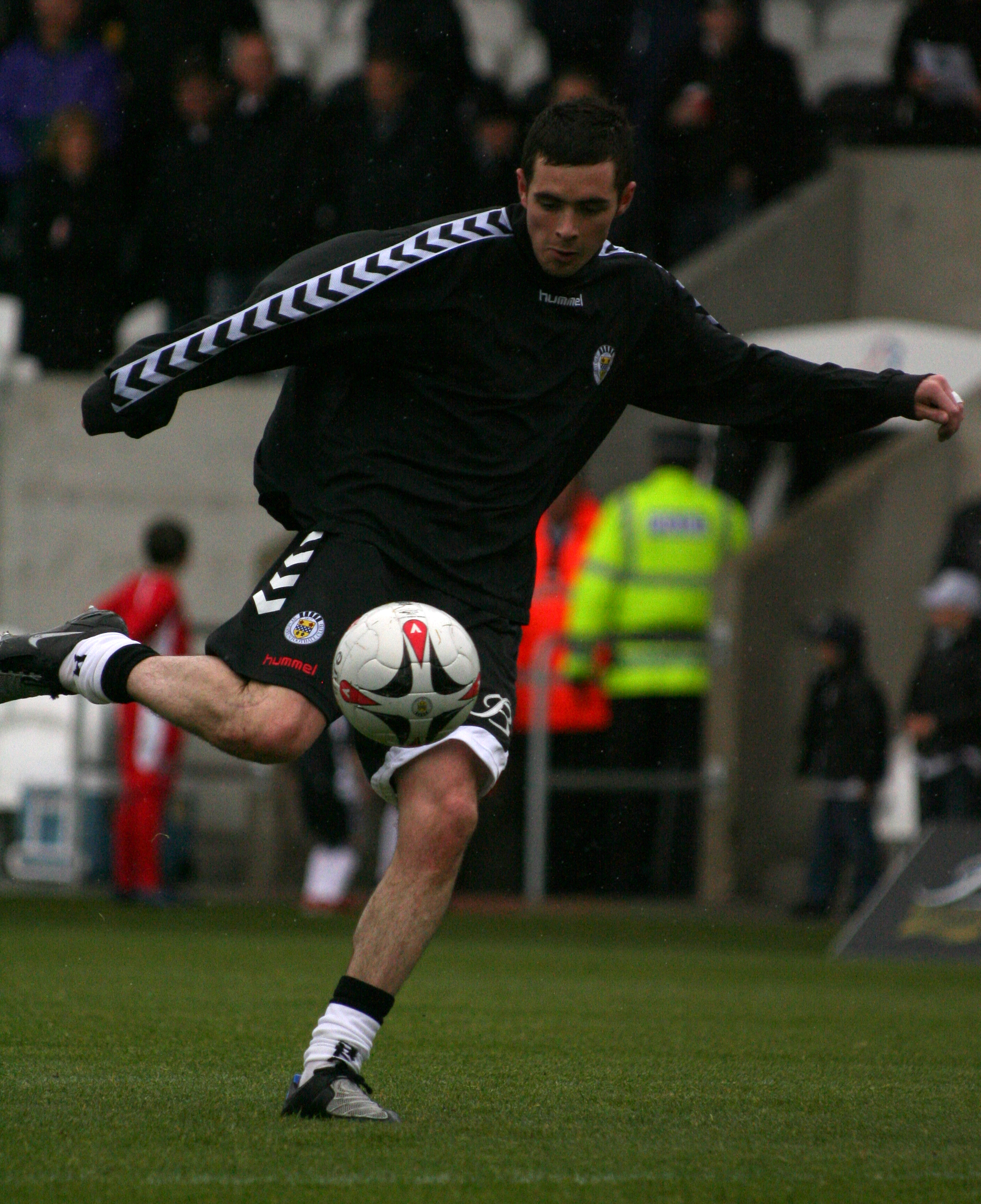

Personal information
- Full name: Gary Ronald Mason
- Date of birth: 15 October 1979 (age 47)
- Place of birth: Edinburgh, Scotland
- Position: Midfielder

Senior career*
Years	Team	Apps	(Gls)
1996–2000	Manchester City	19	(0)
1999–2000	→ Hartlepool United (loan)	6	(0)
2000–2007	Dunfermline Athletic	204	(9)
2007–2009	St Mirren	54	(2)
2009–2010	Hamilton Academical	5	(0)
2010–2012	Dunfermline Athletic	77	(2)
Total		365	(13)

International career
1998–2001	Scotland U21	2	(0)
- * Club domestic league appearances and goals

Gary Ronald Mason (born 15 October 1979) is a Scottish former professional footballer who played as a midfielder.

He began his career with Manchester City and was part of the team that earned promotion back to the Premier League in 2000. He would go to have two separate spells with Dunfermline Athletic playing just under 300 times for them. He also played for Hartlepool United, St Mirren and Hamilton Academical and was capped twice by Scotland U21.

== Career ==
Mason began his career with Manchester City in 1996 and stayed with the club until 2000, making 19 first team league appearances for the Blues. Mason scored once for City, in a League Cup tie against Notts County. He also had a loan spell at Hartlepool United.

After being released by Manchester City in 2000, Mason joined recently promoted Scottish Premier League side Dunfermline Athletic in December 2000. In his six and a half years with the Pars, Mason appeared in a Scottish Cup final, a Scottish League Cup final and also played in both of Dunfermline's UEFA Cup matches against Icelandic side Hafnarfjarðar. After the Pars relegation to the Scottish First Division in 2007, Mason opted to stay in the SPL with St Mirren, signing on a free transfer. He left the Buddies in June 2009.

After his departure from St Mirren, Irish sides Bohemians and St Patrick's Athletic expressed interest in signing Mason. However, on 29 August 2009 it was confirmed that he had signed for Hamilton Academical on a short-term contract. He was then released by Hamilton, having only made five appearances for the club.

In February 2010, Mason rejoined Dunfermline Athletic after being released by Hamilton Academical. Mason scored the winning goal against Greenock Morton in a 1–2 victory on his second debut for the Pars. During the start of pre-season for the 2012–13 season, Mason's retirement was announced by Dunfermline manager Jim Jefferies.

== Post-retirement ==
After retiring, Mason became a taxi driver. He lives in Prestonpans with his wife and two children.
