= Scott Wilson (footballer, born 1977) =

Scottish footballer

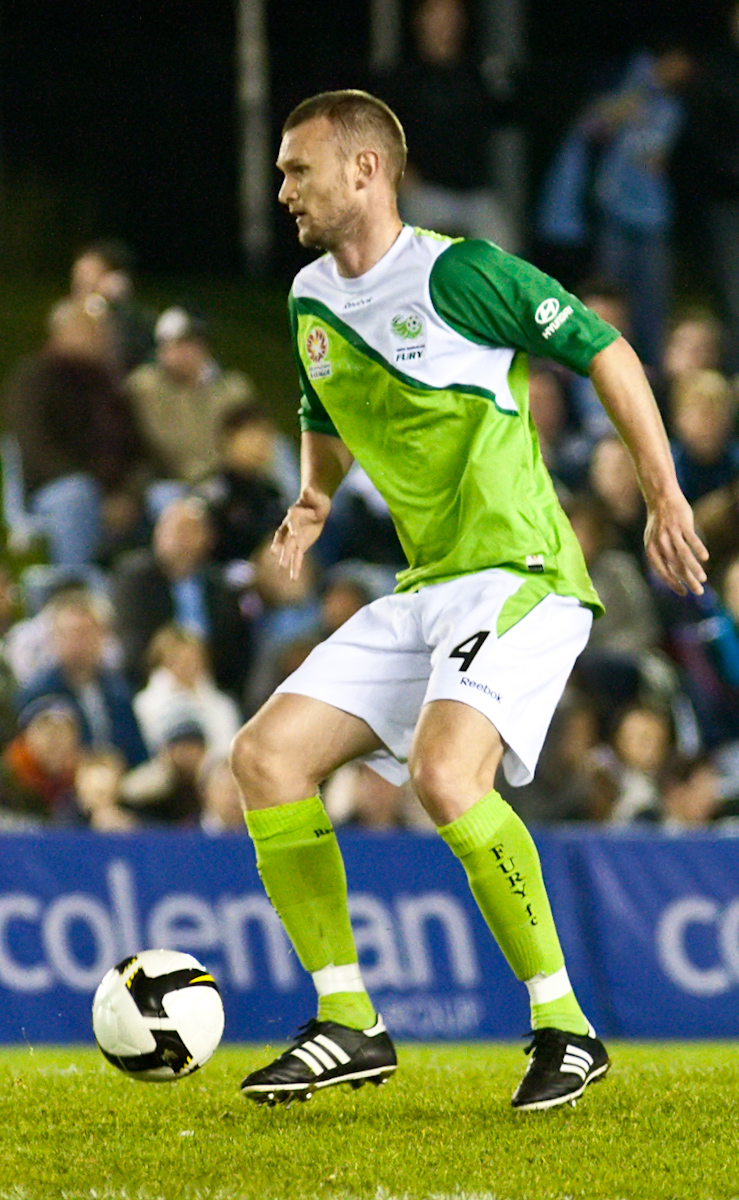
- Wilson playing for North Queensland Fury

Personal information
- Full name: Scott Peter Wilson
- Date of birth: 19 March 1977 (age 49)
- Place of birth: Edinburgh, Scotland
- Position: Centre back

Youth career
- 1993–1996: Rangers

Senior career*
Years	Team	Apps	(Gls)
1996–2002	Rangers	48	(1)
2002	→ Portsmouth (loan)	5	(0)
2002–2009	Dunfermline Athletic	205	(6)
2009–2010	North Queensland Fury	4	(0)

International career
1998–1999	Scotland U21	6	(0)
- * Club domestic league appearances and goals as of 17:47, 13 August 2009 (UTC)

Scott Peter Wilson (born 19 March 1977) is a Scottish former footballer, who played for Rangers, Portsmouth, Dunfermline Athletic and North Queensland Fury. Wilson represented Scotland at under-21 international level.

== Club career ==
Wilson signed for Rangers in 1993 from the club's youth system. He made his debut as a 19-year-old in a UEFA Champions League defeat against Ajax at Ibrox in 1996. Having been sent off in an Old Firm match which contributed to a heavy defeat at the hands of Celtic in November 1998, Wilson regained his place in the squad for the 1–0 victory over the same opposition in the 1999 Scottish Cup Final in which he appeared as a substitute, and contributed to Scottish Premier League title wins for the club in that campaign and the next. He made a total of 75 appearances for Rangers, scoring one goal against Dundee United, before moving to Portsmouth on loan near the end of the 2001–02 season. He played five times during this loan spell, but did not earn a permanent contract and returned to Scotland.

Wilson then signed for Dunfermline Athletic on 5 August 2002. He made his Dunfermline debut in a 6–0 defeat to his former employers Rangers, just two weeks later. Wilson played in the 2006 Scottish League Cup Final and the 2007 Scottish Cup Final, both of which ended in defeat to Celtic; his defensive colleagues included former Rangers youth teammate Greg Shields. He scored one of Dunfermline's goals in the 2007 Scottish Challenge Cup Final, but this was also lost to St Johnstone. One of his last appearances for the club in April 2009 was an opportunity to reach another final, but the Scottish Cup semi-final at Hampden Park was lost to Falkirk, one of their local rivals. In his seven-year spell at Dunfermline, he played in over 200 fixtures in the league alone.

Wilson joined Australian A-League team North Queensland Fury for the 2009–10 season after agreeing to a two-year contract on 6 March 2009.

== International career ==
Wilson played 6 matches for the Scotland under–21 team during his time with Rangers. His performances for Dunfermline earned him selection for the Scotland B squad (then known as "Scotland Future"), but he did not play due to illness.
