= Steven Hampshire =

Scottish footballer

Personal information
- Full name: Steven Gary Hampshire
- Date of birth: 17 October 1979 (age 47)
- Place of birth: Edinburgh, Scotland
- Position: Striker

Youth career
- Chelsea

Senior career*
Years	Team	Apps	(Gls)
1997–2000	Chelsea	0	(0)
1999–2000	→ Dunfermline Athletic (loan)	10	(1)
2000–2003	Dunfermline Athletic	73	(8)
2003–2007	Brechin City	123	(31)
2007–2009	Stenhousemuir	37	(5)
2009	Berwick Rangers	7	(0)
Total		250	(45)
- * Club domestic league appearances and goals

Steven Gary Hampshire (born 17 October 1979) is a Scottish former professional footballer. During his career, Hampshire played for Chelsea, Dunfermline Athletic, Brechin City, Stenhousemuir and Berwick Rangers.

== Career ==
Hampshire was born in Edinburgh, Scotland. He began his career as a youth player at English club Chelsea. He made just one appearance for the club, coming on as a substitute in a 1–1 draw (Chelsea won on penalties) with Blackburn Rovers in the League Cup in October 1997. He was released in 2000 and joined Dunfermline Athletic, having previously had a loan spell at the Fife club. He remained at Dunfermline for three years, but failed to establish a regular place in the first team and was released in 2003. He was quickly signed by Brechin City where he remained for a further four years. He was voted Second Division Player of the Year 2004–05 season Brechin were also Second Division Champions that season. He also won player of the month January 2005.

He left Brechin City in May 2007 and joined Stenhousemuir.

== Personal life ==
His younger brother Paul also played professional football.
