= Andrius Skerla =

Lithuanian footballer

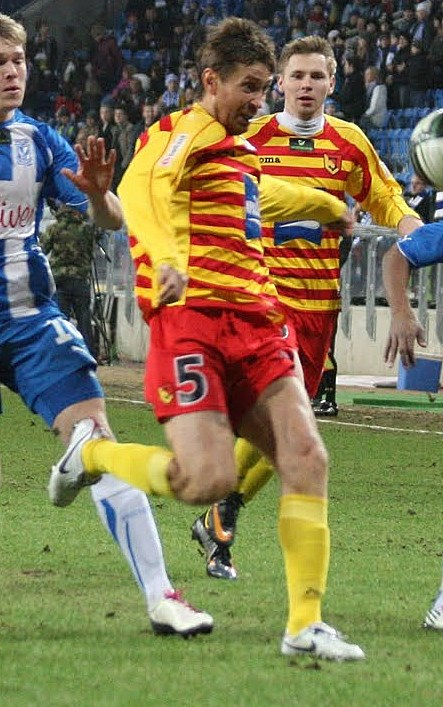
- Skerla with Jagiellonia Białystok in 2011

Personal information
- Date of birth: 29 April 1977 (age 49)
- Place of birth: Vilnius, Lithuania
- Height: 1.85 m (6 ft 1 in)
- Position: Defender

Team information
- Current team: Žalgiris (manager); Lithuania U21 (head coach)

Senior career*
| Years | Team | Apps | (Gls) |
| 1995–1996 | Žalgiris-2 | 14 | (1) |
| 1995–1996 | Žalgiris | 54 | (2) |
| 1997–1999 | PSV | 25 | (0) |
| 2000–2005 | Dunfermline Athletic | 169 | (2) |
| 2005–2006 | Tom Tomsk | 31 | (1) |
| 2007 | Vėtra | 22 | (0) |
| 2007–2008 | Korona Kielce | 21 | (2) |
| 2008–2011 | Jagiellonia Białystok | 95 | (6) |
| 2012–2013 | Žalgiris | 31 | (3) |
| Total | | 462 | (17) |

International career
| 1996–2011 | Lithuania | 84 | (1) |

Managerial career
- 2021–2025: Hegelmann
- 2026–: Lithuania U21
- 2026–: Žalgiris
- * Club domestic league appearances and goals

Andrius Skerla (born 29 April 1977) is a Lithuanian professional football manager and former player who played as a defender. He is the manager of TOPLYGA club Žalgiris and is in charge of the Lithuania national under-21 team. He began his career in Lithuania with Žalgiris, where his performances drew the attention of Dutch club PSV. After making only 25 appearances for PSV, Skerla was signed by Dunfermline Athletic in 2000. He spent five seasons with the club playing in almost 200 matches for the Pars, including the 2004 Scottish Cup Final where he scored in the 3–1 defeat against Celtic.

After leaving Dunfermline in 2005, his later career saw him return east, playing for Russian side Tom Tomsk, Vėtra in Lithuania, Polish clubs Korona Kielce and Jagiellonia Białystok, before finishing his career with his home-town team, Žalgiris.

Skerla was Lithuania's most capped player of all time with 84 appearances, until he was surpassed by Saulius Mikoliūnas in September 2020.

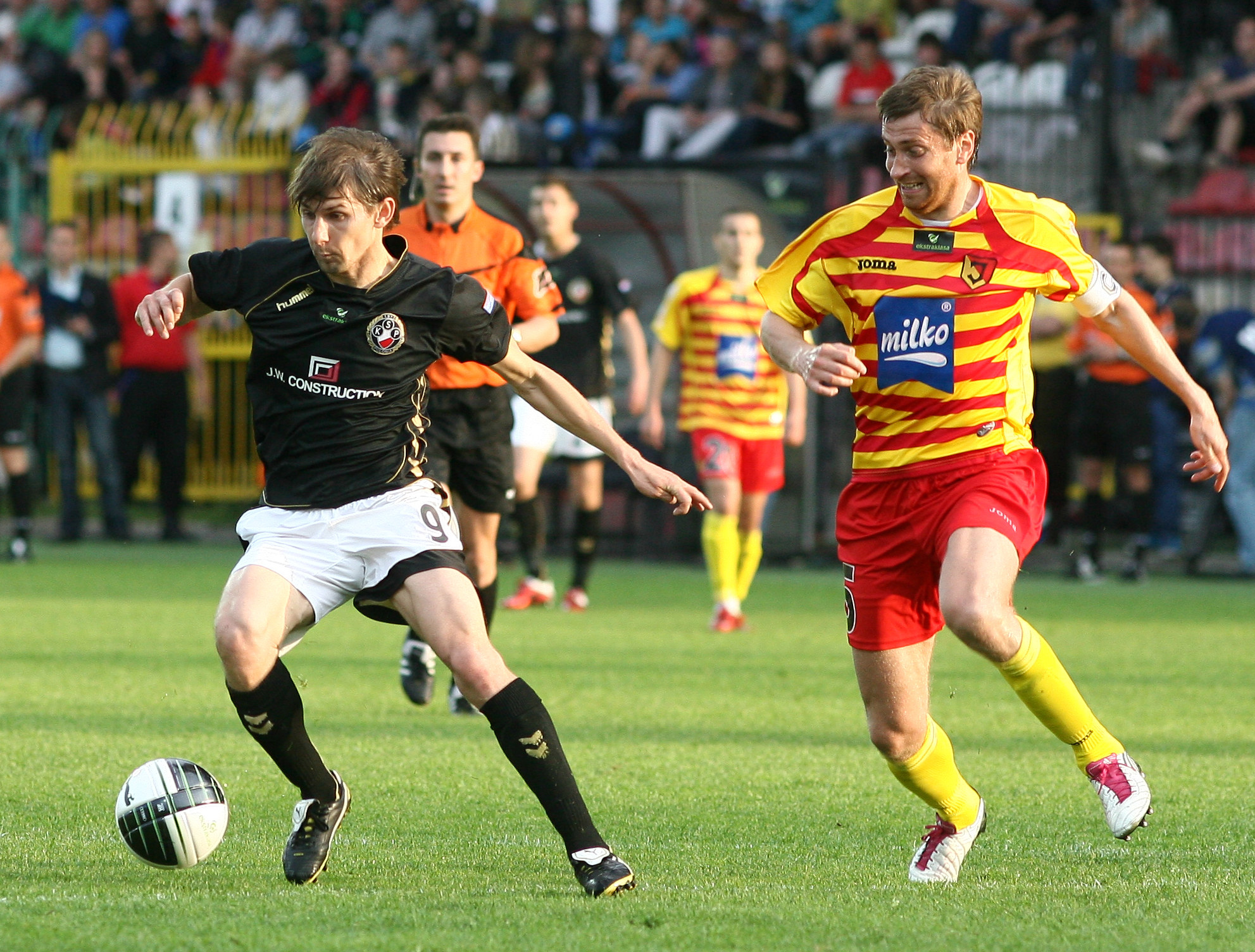
Ebi Smolarek and Skerla

== Club career ==
=== Early career ===
Born in Vilnius, Skerla started his career at local club Žalgiris in 1995, before Dutch club PSV Eindhoven signed him in 1996. After an unsuccessful spell in the Netherlands, Skerla signed for SPL side Dunfermline Athletic.

=== Dunfermline Athletic ===
Skerla's time at Dunfermline was his most successful period of football. He was signed in 2000 by new manager Jimmy Calderwood and was immediately put into the starting line up. After a successful first season at Dunfermline he was linked with numerous clubs including Scottish club Rangers, but Skerla insisted he wanted to stay at East End Park. Skerla will most probably be remembered by the Pars fans, for scoring Dunfermline's only goal in the 2004 Scottish Cup Final defeat against Celtic.

=== Tom Tomsk ===
In March 2005, Skerla announced he wished to leave Dunfermline as he decided to look for new challenges. After Russian side Rubin Kazan had a bid failed because it did not meet Dunfermline's valuation of the player, Skerla re-iterated his decision that he wanted to move and eventually he moved to Tom Tomsk for £200,000.

=== FK Vetra ===
After leaving Dunfermline for Russia, Skerla played for Lithuanian side FK Vėtra.

=== Korona Kielce ===
Later he played for Ekstraklasa team Korona Kielce.

=== Jagiellonia Białystok ===
Skerla played for Ekstraklasa side Jagiellonia Białystok. Skerla scored in the 2010 Polish Cup Final for Jagiellonia, helping them to secure their first senior trophy, as well as ensure they would compete in European competition for the first time in the 2010–11 season.

== International career ==
Skerla marked his 50th appearance for Lithuania on 7 October 2006 with a first international goal against the Faroe Islands. Skerla retired from International football on 11 October 2011 after a defeat to Czech Republic.

Scores and results list Lithuania's goal tally first, score column indicates score after each Skerla goal.

List of international goals scored by Andrius Skerla
| No. | Date | Venue | Opponent | Score | Result | Competition |
|---|---|---|---|---|---|---|
| 1 | 7 October 2006 | Tórsvøllur, Tórshavn, Faroe Islands | Faroe Islands | 1–0 | 1–0 | UEFA Euro 2008 qualifying |

== Honours ==
Žalgiris

- A Lyga: 2013
- Lithuanian Football Cup: 1996–97, 2011–12, 2012–13
- Lithuanian Supercup: 2013

PSV Eindhoven

- Eredivisie: 1999–2000

Jagiellonia Białystok

- Polish Cup: 2009–10
- Polish Super Cup: 2010
