= Lee Bullen =

Scottish footballer (born 1971)

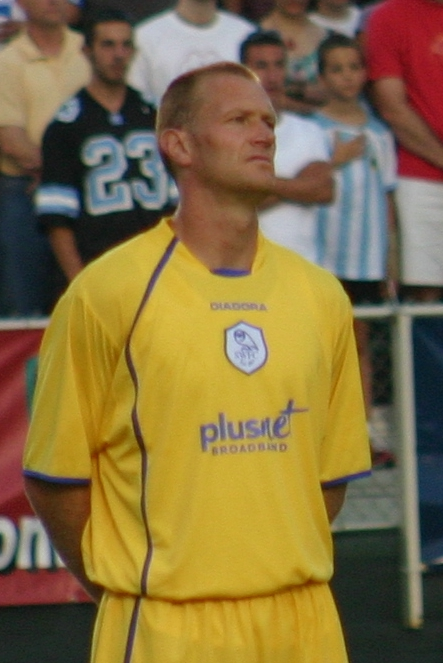
- Bullen lining up for Sheffield Wednesday in 2006

Personal information
- Full name: Lee Bullen
- Date of birth: 29 March 1971 (age 55)
- Place of birth: Edinburgh, Scotland
- Positions: Centre-back; striker

Youth career
- 1988: Dunfermline Athletic

Senior career*
Years	Team	Apps	(Gls)
1988–1989	Dunfermline Athletic	0	(0)
1989–1990	Penicuik Athletic	17	(12)
1990	Meadowbank Thistle	12	(0)
1990–1991	Stenhousemuir	22	(4)
1991–1993	Whitburn	36	(25)
1993	CYC Stanmore	8	(2)
1993	Wollongong Wolves		
1993-1994	Kui Tan		
1994	Kitchee		
1994–1997	Golden		
1997	South China		
1997-1998	Instant-Dict		
1998–2000	Kalamata	50	(11)
2000–2004	Dunfermline Athletic	130	(22)
2004–2008	Sheffield Wednesday	134	(8)
2008–2011	Falkirk	41	(1)
Total		450	(85)

Managerial career
- 2017–2018: Sheffield Wednesday (caretaker)
- 2018–2019: Sheffield Wednesday (caretaker)
- 2019: Sheffield Wednesday (caretaker)
- 2022–2024: Ayr United
- * Club domestic league appearances and goals as of 16:56, 16 August 2019 (UTC)

Lee Bullen (born 29 March 1971) is a Scottish former professional football player and coach. In a career that spanned more than 20 years, Bullen played football professionally in Scotland, England, Australia, Greece and Hong Kong. Having started his career as a striker, Bullen converted to defence midway through his career, and was used in various other positions. Bullen was named as Sheffield Wednesday's greatest ever captain in a 2014 online poll.

== Playing career ==
Bullen was born in Edinburgh. He started his career in Scotland with Dunfermline Athletic, but failed to make an appearance before moving to Penicuik Athletic, a Junior Football team. Bullen then spent time at Meadowbank Thistle, Stenhousemuir and Whitburn. After failing to become an established player at a professional club in Scotland, Bullen moved to Australia to pursue his footballing career, playing for CYC Stanmore and Wollongong Wolves.

During his time in Australia, Bullen was scouted by a Hong Kong football club, Kui Tan, and he made the switch to Hong Kong. He played in the Hong Kong Football League for four seasons in total, moving from Kui Tan to Golden then on to South China. On 26 May 1996, Bullen played for a Hong Kong XI side in an unofficial friendly against England in their build up to Euro 96.

In 1998 Bullen moved to Greece and spent two years at Kalamata in the Greek Football League.

In 2000 at the age of 29, Bullen returned to Scotland, signing for Dunfermline Athletic. Bullen spent five years at the Scottish club.

After leading Dunfermline to the Scottish Cup Final, Bullen moved to English club Sheffield Wednesday on a free transfer in the summer of 2004. He immediately became an integral part of their play-off push after making his debut on 7 August in a 3–0 defeat on the opening day of the season at Hillsborough against Colchester United and scoring his first goal the next game on 10 August, away at Blackpool to lead the team to a 2–1 victory. In November 2005 the Captain's armband was passed onto him by Chris Marsden who was forced into retirement by injury. Bullen finished his first season in Sheffield with seven league goals.

During his time at Sheffield Wednesday he played in all eleven positions for the Owls, including memorably in goal away at Millwall, and received The Wash & Go good sport award for his efforts.

In January 2008, Bullen was informed by Sheffield Wednesday manager Brian Laws that he would not have his contract renewed upon its expiry at the end of the 2007–08 season.

Bullen's final appearance for Sheffield Wednesday came in a crucial relegation battle against Leicester City on the penultimate game of the season which the Owls won 3–1, an injury sustained in this game denied him an appearance for the last match of the season versus Norwich City on 4 May 2008 and a chance to play at Hillsborough for the last time. He did however appear in the end of season lap-of-honour and received a spectacular reception from the fans. Bullen was given a Guard of honour by his Wednesday teammates as he left the pitch for the final time.

In May 2008, Bullen joined Scottish Premier League side Falkirk on a two-year deal. Bullen later became an assistant coach at Falkirk. He scored his only goal for Falkirk in a 2–0 win over Hamilton Academical in November 2009. He left Falkirk in October 2011 to move to Sheffield, where his wife runs an estate agency business.

== Coaching career ==
In 2011, Bullen signed a deal to become a youth coach at his former club Sheffield Wednesday and was given the post of development squad head coach. In October 2015, he was promoted to the position of assistant manager at the club, working on first team coaching and organisation alongside head coach Carlos Carvalhal. Following the dismissal of Carvalhal on 24 December 2017, Bullen took temporary charge of the first team. Bullen once again took temporary charge of the first team on 21 December 2018, following the dismissal of Jos Luhukay.

On 2 January 2019, Steve Bruce was appointed as the new manager of the club. Sheffield Wednesday announced, that Bullen would still remain as part of the senior coaching set-up.

On 15 July 2019, Lee Bullen, for the third time, took temporary charge of the first team after Steve Bruce resigned from Sheffield Wednesday to take charge at Newcastle United.

On 14 August 2020, it was confirmed as part of a coaching staff restructure, Bullen would become a coach of the U23 side.

On 7 January 2022, he was appointed the manager of Scottish Championship side Ayr United. Bullen guided Ayr to second place in 2022–23, but they lost heavily to Partick Thistle in the promotion playoffs. He left Ayr in January 2024 after a run of poor results left them in ninth place.

In January 2025, he would join Boston United as assistant manager to ex Sheffield Wednesday player Graham Coughlan. He left Boston United in January 2026, after the appointment of Paul Hurst as manager.

== Career statistics ==
Appearances and goals by club, season and competition
Club	Season	League		Cup		Other		Total	
Club	Season	Apps	Goals	Apps	Goals	Apps	Goals	Apps	Goals
Kalamata	1997–98	18	4	0	0	0	0	18	4
Kalamata	1998–99	27	7	0	0	0	0	27	7
Kalamata	1999–2000	5	0	0	0	0	0	5	0
Kalamata	Total	50	11	0	0	0	0	50	11
Dunfermline	1999–2000	13	7	0	0	0	0	13	7
Dunfermline	2000–01	24	4	4	0	0	0	28	4
Dunfermline	2001–02	31	4	3	0	0	0	34	4
Dunfermline	2002–03	35	5	6	1	0	0	41	6
Dunfermline	2003–04	27	2	8	1	0	0	35	3
Dunfermline	Total	130	22	21	2	0	0	151	24
Sheffield Wednesday	2004–05	46	7	2	0	4	0	52	7
Sheffield Wednesday	2005–06	28	0	2	0	0	0	30	0
Sheffield Wednesday	2006–07	38	0	3	1	0	0	41	1
Sheffield Wednesday	2007–08	22	1	3	0	0	0	25	1
Sheffield Wednesday	Total	134	8	10	1	4	0	148	9
Falkirk	2008–09	32	0	5	0	0	0	37	0
Falkirk	2009–10	9	1	1	0	0	0	10	1
Falkirk	Total	41	1	6	0	0	0	47	1
Career total		355	42	37	3	4	0	396	45

== Managerial statistics ==
As of match played 13 January 2024

Managerial record by team and tenure
Team	From	To	Record					Ref
Team	From	To	P	W	D	L	Win %	Ref
Sheffield Wednesday (caretaker)	24 December 2017	5 January 2018	4	1	1	2	25.0	
Sheffield Wednesday (caretaker)	21 December 2018	2 January 2019	4	2	2	0	50.0	
Sheffield Wednesday (caretaker)	17 July 2019	6 September 2019	7	4	0	3	57.1	
Ayr United	7 January 2022	15 January 2024	89	32	24	33	36.0	
Total			104	39	27	38	37.5	—

== Honours ==
Instant-Dict

- Hong Kong First Division: 1997–98

Sheffield Wednesday

- Football League One play-offs: 2005

Individual

- Hong Kong Top Footballer: 1994-95
- Football League Good Sport Award: 2006
