= 2008–09 Dunfermline Athletic F.C. season =

Dunfermline Athletic
2008–09 season
- Chairman: John Yorkston
- Manager: Jim McIntyre
- Stadium: East End Park
- Scottish First Division: Third
- Scottish Challenge Cup: Semi-final, lost to Falkirk
- Scottish League Cup: Fourth round, lost to Dundee Utd
- Scottish Cup: Second round, lost to Queen of the South
- Top goalscorer: League: Andy Kirk (15); All: Andy Kirk (17)
- Highest home attendance: 4,653 vs. St Johnstone (1 November 2008)
- Lowest home attendance: 2,930 vs. Queen of the South (9 August 2008)
- Average home league attendance: 3,255
- Biggest win: St Johnstone 0–3 Dunfermline Athletic (16 August 2008); Clyde 1–4 Dunfermline Athletic (21 March 2009); Queen of the South 0–3 Dunfermline Athletic (2 May 2009)
- Biggest defeat: Dunfermline Athletic 0–2 Queen of the South (31 January 2009); Livingston 2–4 Dunfermline Athletic (10 March 2009); Dunfermline Athletic 1–3 St Johnstone (11 April 2009)
Home colours	Away colours
- All statistics correct as of 24 May 2017.

The 2008–09 season was Dunfermline Athletic's second season in the Scottish First Division after being relegated from the Scottish Premier League in 2007.

== Review and Events ==
=== Chronological list of events ===
This is a list of the significant events to occur at the club during the 2008–09 season, presented in chronological order. This list does not include transfers, which are listed in the transfers section below, or match results, which are in the results section.

- 4 July: The Pars undertake their pre-season tour of Austria, playing two games against foreign opponents.
- 5 July: Dunfermline, along with fellow First Division sides Dundee and Ross County are removed from the SFA's Youth Football initiative after all three sides fail to comply with rules regarding coaching disclosures.
- 26 July: The club win in the First round of the Scottish Challenge Cup, beating Stirling Albion 3–0.
- 5 August: Dunfermline win in the First round of the Scottish League Cup, beating Peterhead 2–0.
- 9 August: New striker Andy Kirk scores his first two goals for the Pars in a 2–1 home win over Queen of the South. This is also Dunfermline's first league win of the 2008–09 season.
- 20 August: Dunfermline lose in the Second round of the Scottish Challenge Cup, losing against Queen of the South.
- 26 August: The club progress to the Third round of the Scottish League Cup, beating Second Division side Alloa 1–0.
- 31 August: Former Pars player Jamie Dolan dies of a heart attack whilst out jogging.
- 23 September: The Pars defeat Scottish Premier League side St Mirren 2–0 at home to progress to the Quarter-finals of the Scottish League Cup.
- 11 October: Jim McIntyre picks up the Scottish Football League award for First Division Manager of the Month in September.
- 28 October: Dunfermline are defeated by SPL side Dundee Utd in the Quarter-finals of the Scottish League Cup.
- 10 January: Dunfermline defeat fellow Scottish First Division side Clyde in the Fourth round of the Scottish Cup.

=== League table ===
Pos	Team	Pld	W	D	L	GF	GA	GD	Pts	Promotion, qualification or relegation
1	St Johnstone (C, P)	36	17	14	5	55	35	+20	65	Promotion to the Premier League
2	Partick Thistle	36	16	7	13	39	38	+1	55	
3	Dunfermline Athletic	36	14	9	13	52	44	+8	51	
4	Dundee	36	13	11	12	33	32	+1	50	
5	Queen of the South	36	12	11	13	57	50	+7	47	

Source: BBC Sport
Rules for classification: 1) points; 2) goal difference; 3) number of goals scored.
(C) Champions; (P) Promoted

== Results ==
Win Draw Loss Postponed

=== Pre-season ===
6 July 2008 Friendly	Metalurh Zaporizhya	1–0	Dunfermline Athletic	Austria
	Krivoy 38'	DAFC report		Stadium: Neutral ground Referee: Simon Skowronski
Note: (Match abandoned in the 52nd minute)

9 July 2008 Friendly	Dunfermline Athletic	1–4	Timişoara	Bischofshofen, Austria
	Bayne 86'	DAFC report	Bucur 2', 21', 42'; Karamyan 78'	Stadium: Neutral ground Referee: Simon Skowronski

16 July 2008 Friendly	Dunfermline Athletic	1–0	Heart of Midlothian	Dunfermline, Scotland
	Harper 23'	DAFC report		Stadium: East End Park; Attendance: 1,859; Referee: McDonald

19 July 2008 Closed Doors Friendly	Dunfermline Athletic	1–0	Hamilton Academical	Dunfermline, Scotland
	Glass 88'			Stadium: East End Park; Attendance: 0

22 July 2008 Friendly	Dunfermline Athletic	2–3	Dundee United	Dunfermline, Scotland
	Thomson 58'; Phinn 67'	DAFC report	Sandaza 60', 63'; Robertson 86'	Stadium: East End Park; Attendance: 1,586; Referee: Finnie

=== Scottish First Division ===
2 August 2008 Match 1	Partick Thistle	1–0	Dunfermline Athletic	Glasgow, Scotland
	McKeown 79'	BBC Sport report		Stadium: Firhill Stadium; Attendance: 3,092; Referee: Somers

9 Aug 2008 Match 2	Dunfermline Athletic	2–1	Queen of the South	Dunfermline, Scotland
	Kirk 54', 69'	BBC Sport report	Kean 26'; Aitken (red card) 88'	Stadium: East End Park; Attendance: 2,930; Referee: O'Reilly

16 Aug 2008 Match 3	St Johnstone	0–3	Dunfermline Athletic	Perth, Scotland
		BBC Sport report	Williamson 43'; Phinn 62'; Bayne 86'	Stadium: McDiarmid Park; Attendance: 3,697; Referee: Allan

23 Aug 2008 Match 4	Dunfermline Athletic	0–0	Airdrie United	Dunfermline, Scotland
		BBC Sport report		Stadium: East End Park; Attendance: 3,334; Referee: Charleston

30 Aug 2008 Match 5	Dunfermline Athletic	1–2	Livingston	Dunfermline, Scotland
	Kirk 53'	BBC Sport report	Griffiths 41' 75'	Stadium: East End Park; Attendance: 3,414; Referee: Finnie

13 Sept 2008 Match 6	Dundee	0–0	Dunfermline Athletic	Dundee, Scotland
		BBC Sport report	Woods (red card) 44'	Stadium: Dens Park; Attendance: 4,259; Referee: Norris

20 Sept 2008 Match 7	Dunfermline Athletic	3–1	Ross County	Dunfermline, Scotland
	S Thomson 5'; Phinn 44'; Bell 71'	BBC Sport report	Craig 57'; Hart (yellow card) 70' (yellow-red card)	Stadium: East End Park; Attendance: 2,631; Referee: Boyle

27 Sept 2008 Match 8	Greenock Morton	1–1	Dunfermline Athletic	Greenock, Scotland
	Wake 60'	BBC Sport report	Campbell 89'	Stadium: Cappielow; Attendance: 2,156; Referee: Nicholls

4 Oct 2008 Match 9	Clyde	0–2	Dunfermline Athletic	Cumbernauld, Scotland
		BBC Sport report	Kirk 37'; Harper 43'	Stadium: Broadwood Stadium; Attendance: 1,273; Referee: Allan

18 Oct 2008 Match 10	Dunfermline Athletic	1–0	Partick Thistle	Dunfermline, Scotland
	Kirk 36'	BBC Sport report		Stadium: East End Park; Attendance: 3,242; Referee: Conroy

25 Oct 2008 Match 11	Airdrie United	P – P	Dunfermline Athletic	Airdrie, Scotland
				Stadium: Excelsior Stadium
Note: Postponed due to surface water on pitch

1 Nov 2008 Match 12	Dunfermline Athletic	1–2	St Johnstone	Dunfermline, Scotland
	Wilson 24'	BBC Sport report	Hardie 5'; Craig 66'	Stadium: East End Park; Attendance: 4,653; Referee: Murray

4 Nov 2008 Match 11 ^{(Rearranged)}	Airdrie United	1–3	Dunfermline Athletic	Airdrie, Scotland
	di Giacomo 10'	BBC Sport report	Woods 4'; Glass 29'; Phinn 55'	Stadium: Excelsior Stadium; Attendance: 1,099; Referee: Collum

8 Nov 2008 Match 13	Dunfermline Athletic	0–1	Dundee	Dunfermline, Scotland
		BBC Sport report	Antoine-Curier 68'	Stadium: East End Park; Attendance: 3,506; Referee: O'Reilly

15 Nov 2008 Match 14	Livingston	2–3	Dunfermline Athletic	Livingston, Scotland
	McPake 5'; Elliot 62'	BBC Sport report	Kirk 19', 90'; Bayne 60'	Stadium: Almondvale; Attendance: 1,760; Referee: Smith

22 Nov 2008 Match 15	Dunfermline Athletic	0–1	Greenock Morton	Dunfermline, Scotland
		BBC Sport report	Paartalu 24'	Stadium: East End Park; Attendance: 4,400; Referee: McCurry

6 Dec 2008 Match 16	Ross County	P – P	Dunfermline Athletic	Dingwall, Scotland
				Stadium: Victoria Park
Note: Postponed due to frozen pitch

13 Dec 2008 Match 17	Queen of the South	1–2	Dunfermline Athletic	Dumfries, Scotland
	McQuilken 20'	BBC Sport report	Phinn 4'; Bayne 89'	Stadium: Palmerston Park; Attendance: 2,312; Referee: Thomson

20 Dec 2008 Match 18	Dunfermline Athletic	4–4	Clyde	Dunfermline, Scotland
	Glass 10' (pen.); Kirk 47', 72'; Phinn 79'	BBC Sport report	Trouten 1'; Higgins 50'; Clarke 69'	Stadium: East End Park; Attendance: 3,279; Referee: Richmond

27 Dec 2008 Match 19	Dunfermline Athletic	P – P	Livingston	Dunfermline, Scotland
				Stadium: East End Park
Note: Postponed due to frozen pitch

30 Dec 2008 Match 19 ^{(Rearranged)}	Dunfermline Athletic	1–0	Livingston	Dunfermline, Scotland
	Shields 65'	BBC Sport report		Stadium: East End Park; Attendance: 3,036; Referee: Muir

3 Jan 2009 Match 20	Dundee	1–0	Dunfermline Athletic	Dundee, Scotland
	Paton 67'	BBC Sport report		Stadium: Dens Park; Attendance: 5,033; Referee: Law

17 Jan 2009 Match 21	Dunfermline Athletic	1–1	Airdrie United	Dunfermline, Scotland
	Loy 49'	BBC Sport report	Lynch 15'	Stadium: East End Park; Attendance: 2,915; Referee: Somers

31 Jan 2009 Match 22	Dunfermline Athletic	0–2	Queen of the South	Dunfermline, Scotland
		BBC Sport report	Burns 29'; Dobbie 67'	Stadium: East End Park; Attendance: 2,770; Referee: Boyle

14 Feb 2009 Match 23	Partick Thistle	2–3	Dunfermline Athletic	Glasgow, Scotland
	Buchanan 9'; Doolan 34'; Maxwell (red card) 88'	BBC Sport report	Bell 13'; Kirk 30'; Loy 88' (pen.)	Stadium: Firhill Stadium; Attendance: 2,957; Referee: Collum

21 Feb 2009 Match 24	Dunfermline Athletic	1–2	Ross County	Dunfermline, Scotland
	Bayne 60'	BBC Sport report	Brewster 45'; Higgins 67'	Stadium: East End Park; Attendance: 3,331; Referee: Salmond

28 Feb 2009 Match 25	Greenock Morton	2–1	Dunfermline Athletic	Greenock, Scotland
	Weatherson 28'; Greacen 48'	BBC Sport report	Kirk 83'	Stadium: Cappielow; Attendance: 2,092; Referee: Tumilty

10 Mar 2009 Match 26	Livingston	4–2	Dunfermline Athletic	Livingston, Scotland
	McParland 22'; Davidson 65', 68'; Griffiths 77'	BBC Sport report	Bell 56'; Graham 66'	Stadium: Almondvale Stadium; Attendance: 1,859; Referee: Murray

14 Mar 2009 Match 27	Dunfermline Athletic	0–1	Partick Thistle	Dunfermline, Scotland
		BBC Sport report	Harkins 19' (pen.)	Stadium: East End Park; Attendance: 2,736; Referee: Somers

21 Mar 2009 Match 28	Clyde	1–4	Dunfermline Athletic	Cumbernauld, Scotland
	MacLennan 38'	BBC Sport report	Phinn 4', 62'; Woods 37'; Burke 51'	Stadium: Broadwood Stadium; Attendance: 1,109; Referee: S. McDonald

24 Mar 2009 Match 16 ^{(Rearranged)}	Ross County	2–1	Dunfermline Athletic	Dingwall, Scotland
	Brittain 62'; Brewster 90'		Bayne 87'	Stadium: Victoria Park; Attendance: 1,782; Referee: S. McDonald

31 Mar 2009 Match 29	Dunfermline Athletic	1–1	Dundee	Dunfermline, Scotland
	Woods 90'	BBC Sport report	Malone 61'	Stadium: East End Park; Attendance: 2,382; Referee: D. McDonald

4 Apr 2009 Match 30	Airdrie United	1–1	Dunfermline Athletic	Airdrie, Scotland
	Smith 83'	BBC Sport report	Ross 90'	Stadium: Excelsior Stadium; Attendance: 1,136; Referee: Richmond

7 Apr 2009 Match 31	St Johnstone	0–0	Dunfermline Athletic	Perth, Scotland
		BBC Sport report		Stadium: McDiarmid Park; Attendance: 3,199; Referee: McKendrick

11 Apr 2009 Match 32	Dunfermline Athletic	1–3	St Johnstone	Dunfermline, Scotland
	Kirk 29' (pen.)	BBC Sport report	Hardie 18'; Irvine 41'; Craig 48' (pen.)	Stadium: East End Park; Attendance: 3,596; Referee: O'Reilly

18 Apr 2009 Match 33	Ross County	2–1	Dunfermline Athletic	Dingwall, Scotland
	Craig 47'	BBC Sport report	Woods 35'; Kirk 73'; Bayne 77'	Stadium: Victoria Park; Attendance: 2,413; Referee: McDermott

2 May 2009 Match 34	Queen of the South	0–3	Dunfermline Athletic	Dumfries, Scotland
		DAFC report	Kirk 21'; Woods 26'; Phinn 34'	Stadium: Palmerston Park; Attendance: 2,750; Referee: Boyle

5 May 2009 Match 35	Dunfermline Athletic	2–1	Morton	Dunfermline, Scotland
	Loy 56'; Kirk 86'	BBC Sport report	Monti 62'	Stadium: East End Park; Attendance: 1,438; Referee: Brian Winter

9 May 2009 Match 36	Dunfermline Athletic	1–1	Clyde	Dunfermline, Scotland
	Graham 43'	BBC Sport report	Higgins 27'	Stadium: East End Park; Attendance: 2,418; Referee: Finnie

=== Scottish Cup ===
2009-01-10 Scottish Cup R3	Dunfermline Athletic	2–0	Clyde	East End Park, Dunfermline
	Phinn 20'; Bayne 66'			Attendance: 2,871; Referee: S O'Reilly

2009-02-17 Scottish Cup R4	Airdrie United	1–2	Dunfermline Athletic	New Broomfield, Airdrie
	McLaughlin 14'		Holmes 2'; Bayne 73'	Attendance: 1,772; Referee: C Murray

2009-03-07 Scottish Cup QF	Dunfermline Athletic	1–1	Aberdeen	East End Park, Dunfermline
	Phinn 82'		Aluko 61'	Attendance: 9,696; Referee: C Thomson

2009-03-18 Scottish Cup QFR	Aberdeen	0–0 (2–4 pens.)	Dunfermline Athletic	Pittodrie Stadium, Aberdeen
				Attendance: 13,567; Referee: E Smith

2009-04-26 Scottish Cup SF	Falkirk	2–0	Dunfermline Athletic	Hampden Park, Glasgow
	Scobbie 54'; Arfield 89' (pen.)			Attendance: 17,124; Referee: D McDonald

=== Scottish League Cup ===
2008-08-05 League Cup R1	Peterhead	0–2	Dunfermline Athletic	Balmoor, Peterhead
			Phinn 46'; Kirk 50'	Attendance: 1,291; Referee: G Salmond

2008-08-26 League Cup R2	Dunfermline Athletic	1–0	Alloa Athletic	East End Park, Dunfermline
	Kirk 10'		McKeown (red card) 84'	Attendance: 1,326; Referee: S McLean

2008-09-23 League Cup R3	Dunfermline Athletic	2–0	St Mirren	East End Park, Dunfermline
	Bayne 68'; Wiles 74'			Attendance: 2,186; Referee: C Murray

2008-10-28 League Cup QF	Dundee Utd	1–0	Dunfermline Athletic	Tannadice, Dundee
	S Robertson 15'			Attendance: 5,350; Referee: D McDonald

=== Scottish Challenge Cup ===
2008-07-26 Challenge Cup R1 N&E	Dunfermline Athletic	3–0	Stirling Albion	East End Park, Dunfermline
	Burke 4'; Phinn 61'; Williamson 74'			Attendance: 1,340; Referee: E Smith

2008-08-20 Challenge Cup R2	Dunfermline Athletic	0–2	Queen of the South	East End Park, Dunfermline
			Kean 4'; O'Connor 75'	Attendance: 1,373; Referee: M McCurry

== Stats ==
=== Squad ===
No.	Pos	Nat	Player	Total		First Division		Scottish Cup		League Cup		Challenge Cup	
No.	Pos	Nat	Player	Apps	Goals	Apps	Goals	Apps	Goals	Apps	Goals	Apps	Goals
	GK	(Scotland) SCO	Paul Gallacher	22	0	17	0	0	0	3	0	2	0
	GK	(Scotland) SCO	Greg Paterson	0	0	0	0	0	0	0	0	0	0
	GK	(Scotland) SCO	Calum Reidford	1	0	0	0	0	0	0	0	1	0
	DF	(Ivory Coast) CIV	Souleymane Bamba¹	3	0	1	0	0	0	0	0	2	0
	DF	(Scotland) SCO	Stuart Dearden	0	0	0	0	0	0	0	0	0	0
	DF	(Scotland) SCO	Lee Graham	0	0	0	0	0	0	0	0	0	0
	DF	(Scotland) SCO	Austin McCann	20	0	16	0	0	0	3	0	1	0
	DF	(Scotland) SCO	Harry McGregor	0	0	0	0	0	0	0	0	0	0
	DF	(Scotland) SCO	Greg Ross	4	0	4	0	0	0	0	0	0	0
	DF	(Scotland) SCO	Greg Shields	20	0	14	0	0	0	3	0	3	0
	DF	(Scotland) SCO	Scott Thomson	14	1	10	1	0	0	2	0	2	0
	DF	(Scotland) SCO	Scott Wilson	17	1	12	1	0	0	3	0	2	0
	DF	(England) ENG	Calum Woods	16	1	13	1	0	0	1	0	2	0
	MF	(Scotland) SCO	Steven Bell	5	1	4	1	0	0	1	0	0	0
	MF	(Scotland) SCO	Alex Burke	20	1	16	0	0	0	3	0	1	1
	MF	(Scotland) SCO	Stephen Glass	19	2	16	2	0	0	2	0	1	0
	MF	(Scotland) SCO	Kevin Harper	15	1	11	1	0	0	3	0	1	0
	MF	(Scotland) SCO	Graeme Holmes	0	0	0	0	0	0	0	0	0	0
	MF	(Scotland) SCO	Scott McBride	1	0	0	0	0	0	0	0	1	0
	MF	(Scotland) SCO	Scott Muirhead	3	0	1	0	0	0	0	0	2	0
	MF	(Scotland) SCO	Nick Phinn	20	7	15	5	0	0	3	1	2	1
	MF	(Scotland) SCO	Ryan Thomson	1	0	0	0	0	0	0	0	1	0
	MF	(England) ENG	Simon Wiles	2	1	2	0	0	0	0	1	0	0
	MF	(Scotland) SCO	Iain Williamson	3	2	2	1	0	0	0	0	1	1
	MF	(Scotland) SCO	Paul Willis	1	0	0	0	0	0	0	0	1	0
	FW	(Scotland) SCO	Graham Bayne	21	4	17	3	0	0	3	1	1	0
	FW	(Northern Ireland) NIR	Andy Kirk	20	11	16	9	0	0	3	2	1	0
	FW	(Scotland) SCO	Rory Loy (on loan from Rangers)	1	0	1	0	0	0	0	0	0	0
	FW	(Scotland) SCO	Jamie Mole (on loan from Hearts)	0	0	0	0	0	0	0	0	0	0
	FW	(Scotland) SCO	Jim McIntyre	0	0	0	0	0	0	0	0	0	0
	FW	(Scotland) SCO	Jordan White	0	0	0	0	0	0	0	0	0	0

Notes:

- ¹ Denotes player has left the club.
- Player substitutions are not included.
- Last updated: 2008-12-15

=== Goalscorers ===
Fourteen players have scored for the Pars first team during the 2008–09 season, with 33 goals being scored in total in all competitions. The top goalscorer so far is Andy Kirk with 9 goals.

Name	League	Cups	Total
Andy Kirk	7	2	9
Nick Phinn	4	3	7
Graham Bayne	3	2	5
Iain Williamson	1	1	2
Steven Bell	1		1
Ross Campbell	1		1
Stephen Glass	1		1
Kevin Harper	1		1
Greg Shields	1		1
Scott Thomson	1		1
Scott Wilson	1		1
Calum Woods	1		1
Alex Burke		1	1
Simon Wiles		1	1

=== Discipline ===
So far during the 2008–09 season, two Pars players have been sent off and fourteen have received at least one caution. In total, the team have received two red card and thirty three yellow cards, with Scott Wilson having received the most number of cards (nine cautions).

Name	Cautions	Dismissals
Nick Phinn	(yellow card) 3	(red card) 1
Calum Woods	(yellow card) 3	(red card) 1
Scott Wilson	(yellow card) 9	
Graham Bayne	(yellow card) 5	
Stephen Glass	(yellow card) 3	
Greg Shields	(yellow card) 3	
Steven Bell	(yellow card) 2	
Austin McCann	(yellow card) 2	
Kevin Harper	(yellow card) 1	
Andy Kirk	(yellow card) 1	
Scott Muirhead	(yellow card) 1	
Greg Ross	(yellow card) 1	
Scott Thomson	(yellow card) 1	
Iain Williamson	(yellow card) 1	

Notes:
- Applies to all competitions

== Transfers ==
=== In ===
The Pars brought in 5 players in the close season. Midfielder Steven Bell agreed a pre-contract move in January 2008 from relegated side Stirling Albion. Bell, along with Graeme Holmes who signed from Airdrie United and Austin McCann from Notts County officially signed for the club on 2008-05-19. Striker Graham Bayne signed from Inverness CT for £30,000 in late June, with former Rangers keeper Calum Reidford joining in July after a successful trial with the club. German striker Joseph Laumann also joined the Pars on trial in July, but was not offered a contract. Northern Ireland international Andy Kirk was brought back to Scotland by manager Jim McIntyre from Yeovil Town at the beginning of August for an undisclosed amount and Midfielder Simon Wiles was brought in on a one-year deal from Blackpool after impressing during a trial. Ross Campbell was brought in on a months loan from Scottish Premier League side Hibernian on 2008-09-19. Rangers Reserve striker Rory Loy signed halfway through December on a months loan until 2009-01-26. In January, the Pars brought Hearts young striker Jamie Mole on loan for the remainder of the season.

Player	From	Date	Fee
(Scotland) Steven Bell	Stirling Albion	2008-05-19	Free
(Scotland) Graeme Holmes	Airdrie United	2008-05-19	Free
(Scotland) Austin McCann	Notts County	2008-05-19	Free
(Scotland) Graham Bayne	Inverness CT	2008-06-27	£3,000
(Scotland) Calum Reidford	Unattached	1 July-14, 2008	Trial
(Germany) Joseph Laumann	Rot-Weiß Erfurt	8 July-9, 2008	Trial
(Scotland) Calum Reidford	Unattached	2008-08-15	Free
(Northern Ireland) Andy Kirk	Yeovil Town	2008-08-01	Undisclosed
(England) Simon Wiles	Blackpool	18 August-22, 2008	Trial
(England) Simon Wiles	Blackpool	2008-08-23	Free
(Scotland) Ross Campbell	Hibernian	2008-09-19	Loan
(Scotland) Rory Loy	Rangers	2008-12-12	Loan
(Scotland) Jamie Mole	Hearts	2009-01-10	Loan

=== Out ===
6 of the Pars first team players from the 2007–08 season left the club in the summer on free transfers. Stephen Simmons, Darren Young, Stevie Crawford and Aaron Labonte all became free agents when their contracts ran out, while Scott Morrison and Mark Burchill signed pre-contracts with Ross County and Rotherham respectively. Young goalkeeper Sean Murdoch opted to join recently promoted side Hamilton Academical (with whom he'd previously been on loan) and at the start of September, Centre-back Sol Bamba joining SPL side Hibernian for an undisclosed sum. September also saw young defender Greg Ross join Second Division side Cowdenbeath on a months loan.

Player	From	Date	Fee
(Scotland) Stephen Simmons	Unattached	1 May 2008	Free
(Scotland) Scott Morrison	Ross County	6 May 2008	Free
(Scotland) Sean Murdoch	Hamilton Academical	6 May 2008	Undisclosed
(Scotland) Darren Young	Unattached	27 May 2008	Free
(Scotland) Aaron Labonte	Unattached	31 May 2008	Free
(Scotland) Mark Burchill	Rotherham United	12 June 2008	Free
(Scotland) Stephen Crawford	East Fife	22 July 2008	Free
(Ivory Coast) Souleymane Bamba	Hibernian	1 September 2008	Undisclosed
(Scotland) Greg Ross	Cowdenbeath	12 September 2008	Loan
