= 2006–07 Dunfermline Athletic F.C. season =

Dunfermline Athletic
2006–07 season
- Chairman: John Yorkston
- Manager: Jim Leishman (until 26 October); Craig Robertson (caretaker from 26 October until 10 November); Stephen Kenny (from 10 November)
- Stadium: East End Park
- SPL: Twelfth place (relegated)
- League Cup: Third round
- Scottish Cup: Runners-up
- Top goalscorer: League: Stevie Crawford (5); All: Stevie Crawford & Stephen Simmons (5)
- Highest home attendance: League: 8,561 vs. Rangers, (13 August 2006)
- Lowest home attendance: League: 4,200 vs. Motherwell, (10 March 2007)
- Average home league attendance: 6,106
Home colours	Away colours

The 2006–07 was Dunfermline Athletic's seventh season in the Scottish Premier League. Dunfermline Athletic competed in the League Cup and the Scottish Cup. Although being relegated at the end of the season, Dunfermline qualified for the following season's UEFA Cup after playing in the Scottish Cup final against Celtic.

== Results & fixtures ==
Win Draw Loss Postponed

=== Pre-season ===
15 Jul 2006 Friendly	Dunfermline Athletic	1 – 3	Gretna	East End Park
	Main 5' (o.g.)	DAFC.net report	Deuchar 11', 63'; McGuffie 55' (pen.)	Attendance: 1,032; Referee: Allan

17 Jul 2006 Friendly	Cowdenbeath	1 – 2	Dunfermline Athletic	Central Park
	Ritchie 42'	DAFC.net report	McIntyre 14'; Smith 88'	Referee: Finnie

22 Jul 2006 Friendly	Dunfermline Athletic	0 – 2	(England) Carlisle United	East End Park
		DAFC.net report	Gall	Attendance: 1,067; Referee: Tumilty

25 Jul 2006 Friendly	Dunfermline Athletic	0 – 1	(England) West Bromwich Albion	East End Park
		DAFC.net report	Hartson 39'

=== Scottish Premier League ===
29 Jul 2006 Match 1	Dunfermline Athletic	1 – 2	Heart of Midlothian	East End Park
15:00	Simmons 62'; Tod (yellow card) 80' (red card)	BBC Sport report	Bednář 15'; Pospíšil 78'	Attendance: 7,936; Referee: Winter

5 Aug 2006 Match 2	Falkirk	1 – 0	Dunfermline Athletic	Falkirk Stadium
15:00	Barr 11'	BBC Sport report		Attendance: 5,542; Referee: Thomson

13 Aug 2006 Match 3	Dunfermline Athletic	1 – 1	Rangers	East End Park
15:00	O. Morrison 69'	BBC Sport report	Buffel 63'	Attendance: 8,561; Referee: Richmond

19 Aug 2006 Match 4	Dundee United	0 – 0	Dunfermline Athletic	Tannadice
15:00		BBC Sport report		Attendance: 6,171; Referee: Tumilty

26 Aug 2006 Match 5	Aberdeen	1 – 0	Dunfermline Athletic	Pittodrie
15:00	Severin 68'	BBC Sport report		Attendance: 9,889; Referee: Smith

9 Sept 2006 Match 6	Dunfermline Athletic	3 – 2	Kilmarnock	East End Park
15:00	Young 42'; Mason 73'; Crawford 84'	BBC Sport report	Invincibile 9'; Wales 52'	Attendance: 4,510; Referee: Clark

16 Sept 2006 Match 7	Celtic	1 – 0	Dunfermline Athletic	Celtic Park
15:00	McManus 31'	BBC Sport report		Attendance: 55,894; Referee: Smith

23 Sept 2006 Match 8	Dunfermline Athletic	2 – 1	St Mirren	East End Park
15:00	Young 46'; Crawford 73'	BBC Sport report	Sutton 10'	Attendance: 4,914; Referee: MacKay

30 Sept 2006 Match 9	Inverness CT	1 – 0	Dunfermline Athletic	Caledonian Stadium
15:00	Tokely 90'	BBC Sport report		Attendance: 3,517; Referee: Murray

14 Oct 2006 Match 10	Motherwell	2 – 1	Dunfermline Athletic	Fir Park
15:00	McDonald 61'; Clarkson 84'	BBC Sport report	Crawford 69'	Attendance: 4,527; Referee: McDonald

23 Oct 2006 Match 11	Dunfermline Athletic	0 – 4	Hibernian	East End Park
19:45		BBC Sport report	Sproule 44'; Killen 62', 90'; Benjelloun 89'	Attendance: 6,057; Referee: McCurry

28 Oct 2006 Match 12	Hearts	1 – 1	Dunfermline Athletic	Tynecastle Stadium
15:00	Velička 12'	BBC Sport report	Hamilton 48'	Attendance: 17,031; Referee: Winter

4 Nov 2006 Match 13	Dunfermline Athletic	0 – 3	Falkirk	East End Park
15:00		BBC Sport report	Stokes 1', 59', 80'	Attendance: 6,504; Referee: Brines

11 Nov 2006 Match 14	Rangers	2 – 0	Dunfermline Athletic	Ibrox
15:00	Boyd 61'; Smith 77'	BBC Sport report		Attendance: 48,218; Referee: Conroy

18 Nov 2006 Match 15	Dunfermline Athletic	2 – 1	Dundee United	East End Park
15:00	Shields 76'; Mason 89'	BBC Sport report	Robson 52'	Attendance: 6,129; Referee: Freeland

25 Nov 2006 Match 16	Dunfermline Athletic	0 – 3	Aberdeen	East End Park
15:00		BBC Sport report	Miller 54'; Mackie 83', 85'	Attendance: 6,501; Referee: Tumilty

2 Dec 2006 Match 17	Kilmarnock	5 – 1	Dunfermline Athletic	Rugby Park
15:00	Greer 7' di Giacomo 19', 25'; Nish 27', 72'	BBC Sport report	Crawford 11'; Bamba (red card) 57'	Attendance: 4,750; Referee: Underhill

10 Dec 2006 Match 18	Dunfermline Athletic	1 – 2	Celtic	Celtic Park
15:00	Simmons 90'	BBC Sport report	McGeady 49'; Żurawski 68'	Attendance: 7,080; Referee: Thomson

16 Dec 2006 Match 19	St Mirren	0 – 0	Dunfermline Athletic	Love Street
15:00		BBC Sport report		Attendance: 4,246; Referee: Finnie

23 Dec 2006 Match 20	Dunfermline Athletic	0 – 0	Inverness CT	East End Park
15:00	Crawford (yellow card) 77' (yellow-red card)	BBC Sport report		Attendance: 4,216; Referee: Collum

26 Dec 2006 Match 21	Dunfermline Athletic	0 – 2	Motherwell	East End Park
15:00	Hamilton (red card) 80'	BBC Sport report	Fitzpatrick 26'; McDonald 79'	Attendance: 4,200; Referee: Ritchie

30 Dec 2006 Match 22	Hibernian	2 – 0	Dunfermline Athletic	Easter Road
15:00	Killen 63', 72' (pen.)	BBC Sport report		Attendance: 14,061; Referee: Brines

2 Jan 2007 Match 23	Dunfermline Athletic	0 – 1	Heart of Midlothian	East End Park
15:00		BBC Sport report	Pospíšil 16'	Attendance: 7,004; Referee: Thomson

7 Jan 2007 Match 24	Falkirk	1 – 0	Dunfermline Athletic	Falkirk Stadium
15:00	Gow 90'	BBC Sport report		Attendance: 6,051; Referee: Smith

21 Jan 2007 Match 25	Dunfermline Athletic	0 – 1	Rangers	East End Park
15:00		BBC Sport report	Adam 9'	Attendance: 7,868; Referee: Underhill

27 Jan 2007 Match 26	Dundee United	0 – 0	Dunfermline Athletic	Tannadice
15:00		BBC Sport report		Attendance: 6,295; Referee: McDonald

10 Feb 2007 Match 27	Aberdeen	3 – 0	Dunfermline Athletic	Pittodrie
15:00	Mackie 33'; Nicholson 58' (pen.); Lovell 83'	BBC Sport report		Attendance: 9,379; Referee: Winter

17 Feb 2007 Match 28	Dunfermline Athletic	1 – 1	Kilmarnock	East End Park
15:00	Crawford 45' (pen.)	BBC Sport report	Naismith 10'; Ford (red card) 44'	Attendance: 4,500; Referee: Somers

3 Mar 2007 Match 29	Celtic	2 – 1	Dunfermline Athletic	East End Park
15:00	Miller 4'; Vennegoor of Hesselink 76'	BBC Sport report	Hammill 87'	Attendance: 59,131; Referee: Conroy

10 Mar 2007 Match 30	Dunfermline Athletic	0 – 0	St Mirren	East End Park
15:00		BBC Sport report		Attendance: 7,149; Referee: Richmond

17 Mar 2007 Match 31	Inverness CT	1 – 3	Dunfermline Athletic	Caledonian Stadium
15:00	Paatelainen 23'	BBC Sport report	Glass 48', 79' (pen.); McIntyre 61'; McManus (yellow card) 90' (red card)	Attendance: 4,447; Referee: Boyle

31 Mar 2007 Match 32	Motherwell	2 – 0	Dunfermline Athletic	Fir Park
15:00	McDonald 51' (pen.) 62'	BBC Sport report		Attendance: 4,511; Referee: Finnie

7 Apr 2007 Match 33	Dunfermline Athletic	1 – 0	Hibernian	East End Park
15:00	McGuire 84'	BBC Sport report		Attendance: 6,001; Referee: MacKay

21 Apr 2007 Match 34	Dunfermline Athletic	1 – 0	Dundee United	East End Park
15:00	McManus 34'	BBC Sport report		Attendance: 5,131; Referee: Freeland

30 Apr 2007 Match 35	St Mirren	0 – 1	Dunfermline Athletic	Love Street
19:45		BBC Sport report	McManus 58'	Attendance: 10,251; Referee: McCurry

7 May 2007 Match 36	Dunfermline Athletic	4 – 1	Motherwell	East End Park
19:45	O'Brien 6'; S. Wilson 11' (red card) 86'; Glass 58' (pen.); Hamilton 90'	BBC Sport report	McDonald 87' (pen.) (red card) 88'; Reynolds (red card) 68'	Attendance: 6,662; Referee: McDonald

12 May 2006 Match 37	Inverness CT	2 – 1	Dunfermline Athletic	Caledonian Stadium
15:00	Hastings 77'; McAllister 89'	BBC Sport report	McIntyre 37'	Attendance: 6,464; Referee: Ritchie

19 May 2006 Match 38	Dunfermline Athletic	0 – 3	Falkirk	East End Park
15:00		BBC Sport report	Thomson 49'; Gow 57'; Moutinho 90'	Attendance: 5,087; Referee: Smith

=== Scottish League Cup ===
22 Aug 2006 Second round	Ayr United	0 – 0 (6–7 p)	Dunfermline Athletic	Somerset Park
19:45		BBC Sport report		Attendance: 1,507; Referee: Thomson
	Penalties
	Vareille (penalty scored); Weaver (penalty missed); Dunn (penalty scored); Robertson (penalty scored); Caddis (penalty missed); Forrest (penalty scored); Casey (penalty scored); Lowing (penalty scored); Pettigrew (penalty missed)		Young (penalty scored); Woods (penalty missed); McGuire (penalty scored); O. Morrison (penalty scored); Mason (penalty missed); C. Wilson (penalty scored); Tod (penalty scored); Smith (penalty scored); S. Wilson (penalty scored)

20 Sept 2006 Third round	Dunfermline Athletic	0 – 2	Rangers	East End Park
19:45		BBC Sport report	Bamba 65' (o.g.); Boyd 73'	Attendance: 5,702; Referee: McCurry

=== Scottish Cup ===
7 Jan 2007 Third round	Dunfermline Athletic	3 – 2	Rangers	East End Park
12:00	Hamilton 17'; Simmons 29'; McGuire 46'	BBC Sport report	Boyd 54', 68'	Attendance: 7,231; Referee: Brines

3 Feb 2007 Fourth round	Dunfermline Athletic	1 – 0	Heart of Midlothian	East End Park
15:00	S. Wilson 90'	BBC Sport report		Attendance: 7,231; Referee: McCurry

24 Feb 2007 Quarter-finals	Dunfermline Athletic	2 – 0	Partick Thistle	East End Park
15:00	Simmons 4', 86'	BBC Sport report		Attendance: 7,090; Referee: Brines

15 Apr 2007 Semi-finals	Hibernian	0 – 0	Dunfermline Athletic	Hampden Park
15:00		BBC Sport report		Attendance: 25,336; Referee: Thomson

24 Apr 2007 Semi-final replay	Dunfermline Athletic	1 – 0	Hibernian	Hampden Park
19:45	McIntyre 88' (pen.)	BBC Sport report		Attendance: 8,536; Referee: Thomson

26 May 2007 Final	Celtic	1 – 0	Dunfermline Athletic	Hampden Park
12:30	Perrier-Doumbé 84'	BBC Sport report		Attendance: 49,600; Referee: Clark

== Player statistics ==
=== Squad ===
Last updated 26 May 2007

No.	Pos	Nat	Player	Total		SPL		Scottish Cup		League Cup	
No.	Pos	Nat	Player	Apps	Goals	Apps	Goals	Apps	Goals	Apps	Goals
1	GK	(Scotland) SCO	Roddy McKenzie	13	0	12	0	1	0	0	0
2	DF	(Scotland) SCO	Greg Shields	33	1	29	1	3	0	1	0
3	DF	(Scotland) SCO	Scott Wilson	38	2	31	1	5	1	2	0
4	MF	(Scotland) SCO	Darren Young	26	2	21	2	3	0	2	0
5	DF	(Scotland) SCO	Jamie McCunnie	19	0	14	0	4	0	1	0
6	DF	(Scotland) SCO	Scott Thomson	0	0	0	0	0	0	0	0
7	MF	(Scotland) SCO	Stephen Simmons	27	5	23	2	3	3	1	0
8	MF	(Scotland) SCO	Gary Mason	42	2	36	2	4	0	2	0
9	FW	(Scotland) SCO	Mark Burchill	24	0	20	0	4	0	0	0
10	FW	(Scotland) SCO	Jim McIntyre	14	3	10	2	4	1	0	0
11	MF	(Scotland) SCO	Scott Muirhead	30	0	26	0	3	0	1	0
12	GK	(Scotland) SCO	Scott Morrison	16	0	12	0	4	0	0	0
13	FW	(Scotland) SCO	Tam McManus	13	2	13	2	0	0	0	0
14	DF	(Scotland) SCO	Phil McGuire	31	2	24	1	5	1	2	0
15	MF	(Northern Ireland) NIR	Owen Morrison	31	1	24	1	5	0	2	0
16	MF	(England) ENG	Adam Hammill	18	1	13	1	5	0	0	0
17	MF	(France) FRA	Frédéric Daquin	22	0	20	0	1	0	1	0
18	DF	(Scotland) SCO	Andy Tod	11	0	10	0	0	0	1	0
19	DF	(England) ENG	Aaron Labonte	14	0	13	0	0	0	1	0
20	FW	(Scotland) SCO	Jim Hamilton	33	3	28	2	4	1	1	0
21	DF	(England) ENG	Calum Woods	14	0	12	0	1	0	1	0
22	MF	(Scotland) SCO	Craig Wilson	4	0	3	0	1	0	0	0
23	DF	(Scotland) SCO	Greg Ross	32	0	26	0	5	0	1	0
24	DF	(Ivory Coast) CIV	Sol Bamba	30	0	23	0	5	0	2	0
25	FW	(Scotland) SCO	Stephen Crawford	34	5	29	5	4	0	1	0
27	MF	(Scotland) SCO	Nick Phinn	0	0	0	0	0	0	0	0
28	MF	(Scotland) SCO	Jim O'Brien	18	1	13	1	5	0	0	0
29	GK	(Netherlands) NED	Dorus de Vries	34	0	27	0	5	0	2	0
30	MF	(Republic of Ireland) IRL	Bobby Ryan	5	0	5	0	0	0	0	0
31	FW	(Scotland) SCO	Calum Smith	2	0	1	0	0	0	1	0
32	MF	(Scotland) SCO	Iain Williamson	5	0	4	0	1	0	0	0
48	MF	(Scotland) SCO	Stephen Glass	11	3	11	3	0	0	0	0
55	DF	(Wales) WAL	Jamie Harris	1	0	1	0	0	0	0	0
30	GK	(Scotland) SCO	Sean Murdoch	0	0	0	0	0	0	0	0
Players who appeared for Dunfermline Athletic but left during the season:
16	FW	(England) ENG	Noel Whelan	1	0	1	0	0	0	0	0

=== Goalscorers ===
As of match played 26 May 2007

Place	Position	Nation	Name	Total	SPL	Scottish Cup	Scottish League Cup
1	FW	(Scotland)	Stephen Crawford	5	5		
2	MF	(Scotland)	Stephen Simmons	5	2	3	
3	MF	(Scotland)	Stephen Glass	3	3		
3	FW	(Scotland)	Jim Hamilton	3	2	1	
3	FW	(Scotland)	Jim McIntyre	3	2	1	
5	MF	(Scotland)	Gary Mason	2	2		
5	FW	(Scotland)	Tam McManus	2	2		
5	MF	(Scotland)	Darren Young	2	2		
5	DF	(Scotland)	Phil McGuire	2	1	1	
5	DF	(Scotland)	Scott Wilson	2	1	1	
10	MF	(England)	Adam Hammill	1	1		
10	MF	(Northern Ireland)	Owen Morrison	1	1		
10	MF	(Scotland)	Jim O'Brien	1	1		
10	DF	(Scotland)	Greg Shields	1	1		
Total				33	26	7	0

== Club statistics ==
=== League table ===
Pos	Team	Pld	W	D	L	GF	GA	GD	Pts	Qualification or relegation (Note: Teams played each other three times (33 matches), before the league split into two groups (the top six and the bottom six) for the last five matches.)
8	Inverness Caledonian Thistle	38	11	13	14	42	48	−6	46	
9	Dundee United	38	10	12	16	40	59	−19	42	
10	Motherwell	38	10	8	20	41	61	−20	38	
11	St Mirren	38	8	12	18	31	51	−20	36	
12	Dunfermline Athletic (R)	38	8	8	22	26	55	−29	32	Relegation to the Scottish First Division and qualification for UEFA Cup second qualifying round (Note: As Celtic, the Scottish Cup winners, qualified for the Champions League via their league position, the place in the UEFA Cup was passed to Dunfermline Athletic, the cup runner-up.)

Source: Scottish Professional Football League
Rules for classification: 1) Points; 2) Goal difference; 3) Goals scored
(R) Relegated

==== Results summary ====
Overall								Home						Away					
Pld	W	D	L	GF	GA	GD	Pts	W	D	L	GF	GA	GD	W	D	L	GF	GA	GD
38	8	8	22	26	55	−29	32	6	4	9	17	28	−11	2	4	13	9	27	−18

Last updated: 11 December 2015.
Source: statto.com

== Transfers ==
=== Players in ===
Date	Position	Nationality	Name	From	Fee	Ref.
5 July 2006	DF	(Scotland)	Phil McGuire	(England) Doncaster Rovers	Free	
13 July 2006	GK	(Scotland)	Roddy McKenzie	Livingston	Free	
14 July 2006	FW	(Scotland)	Jim McIntyre	Dundee United	Free	
19 July 2006	DF	(England)	Calum Woods	(England) Liverpool	Free	
21 July 2006	GK	(Netherlands)	Dorus de Vries	(Netherlands) ADO Den Haag	Free	
21 July 2006	MF	(Northern Ireland)	Owen Morrison	(England) Bradford City	Free	
27 July 2006	DF	(Ivory Coast)	Sol Bamba	(France) Paris Saint-Germain	Free	
28 July 2006	FW	(Scotland)	Noel Whelan	Livingston	Free	
29 August 2006	FW	(Scotland)	Jim Hamilton	Motherwell	Free	
31 August 2006	FW	(Scotland)	Stevie Crawford	Aberdeen	Free	
13 January 2007	MF	(Republic of Ireland)	Bobby Ryan	(Republic of Ireland) Shelbourne	Free	
13 January 2007	DF	(Wales)	Jamie Harris	(Republic of Ireland) Shelbourne	Free	
26 February 2007	FW	(Scotland)	Tam McManus	Falkirk	Free	

=== Players out ===
Date	Position	Nationality	Name	To	Fee	Ref.
20 June 2006	FW	(Republic of Ireland)	Noel Hunt	Dundee United	£50,000	
8 August 2006	FW	(Scotland)	Andy Campbell	(England) Halifax Town	Free	
20 August 2006	DF	(Scotland)	Iain Campbell	Kilmarnock	Undisclosed	
6 January 2007	FW	(Scotland)	Noel Whelan	Free agent	Released	

=== Loan in ===
Date	Position	Nationality	Name	From	Duration	Ref.
6 January 2007	MF	(Republic of Ireland)	Jim O'Brien	Celtic	End of season	
17 January 2007	MF	(England)	Adam Hammill	(England) Liverpool	End of season	

=== Loans out ===
Date	Position	Nationality	Name	To	Duration	Ref.
22 July 2006	GK	(Scotland)	Sean Murdoch	Forfar Athletic	Five months	
13 October 2006	DF	(Scotland)	Craig Wilson	Raith Rovers	End of season	
15 February 2007	GK	(Scotland)	Sean Murdoch	Hamilton Academical	Three months	
