= 2009–10 Dunfermline Athletic F.C. season =

Dunfermline Athletic
2009–10 season
- Chairman: John Yorkston
- Manager: Jim McIntyre
- Scottish First Division: 3rd
- Scottish Cup: Fifth Round (eliminated by Celtic)
- Scottish League Cup: Third Round (eliminated by Hearts)
- Scottish Challenge Cup: Second Round (eliminated by Queen of the South)
- Top goalscorer: League: Willie Gibson (9); All: Andy Kirk (15)
- Highest home attendance: 6,289 (vs Raith Rovers, 29 August 2009)
- Lowest home attendance: 2,834 (vs Airdrie Utd, 22 August 2009)
Home colours	Away colours

The 2009–10 season was Dunfermline Athletic's 3rd season in the Scottish First Division after being relegated from the Scottish Premier League in 2007.

== Review and Events ==
=== Chronological list of events ===
This is a list of the significant events to occur at the club during the 2009–10 season, presented in chronological order. This list does not include transfers, which are listed in the transfers section below, or match results, which are in the results section.

- 4 July: Director Gordon McDougall leaves the Pars towards the end of July to increase his efforts helping stricken side Livingston.

=== League table ===
Pos	Team	Pld	W	D	L	GF	GA	GD	Pts	Promotion, qualification or relegation
1	Inverness Caledonian Thistle (C, P)	36	21	10	5	72	32	+40	73	Promotion to the Premier League
2	Dundee	36	16	13	7	48	34	+14	61	
3	Dunfermline Athletic	36	17	7	12	54	44	+10	58	
4	Queen of the South	36	15	11	10	53	40	+13	56	
5	Ross County	36	15	11	10	46	44	+2	56	

Source: Scottish Football League
Rules for classification: 1) points; 2) goal difference; 3) number of goals scored.
First Division play-offs: The 9th place team will be entered into a play-off with the 2nd, 3rd and 4th places of the Second Division. The winner gets a place in the 2010-11 First Division
(C) Champions; (P) Promoted

== Match results ==
=== Friendlies ===
8 July 2009 Friendly	Stirling Albion	0–1	Dunfermline Athletic	Forthbank Stadium
			Cardle 15'	Referee: Stephen Finnie

11 July 2009 Friendly	Blyth Spartans	2–4	Dunfermline Athletic	Croft Park
	Ross 39' (o.g.); Williams 41'		Bayne 12', 77'; Gibson 20'; Kirk 68' (pen.)	Attendance: 333; Referee: Tony Young

14 July 2009 Friendly	Dunfermline Athletic	0–2	Dundee United	East End Park
			S. Robertson 4'; Goodwillie 80'	Attendance: 1,221; Referee: Willie Collum

18 July 2009 Friendly	Dunfermline Athletic	0–4	Hibernian	East End Park
			Nish 7', 33'; Riordan 55'; Johansson 91'	Attendance: 4,151; Referee: Steven Nicholls

21 July 2009 Friendly	East Fife	1–7	Dunfermline Athletic	Bayview Stadium
	McManus 71' (pen.)		Bayne 1', 25', 43'; Higgins 23'; Graham 65'; Willis 79'; Bell 89'	Referee: Brian Colvin

26 July 2009 Friendly	Dunfermline Athletic	1–0	Coventry	East End Park
	Kirk 39'			Attendance: 1,162; Referee: John McKendrick

=== League ===
8 August 2009 SFL1 No. 1	Dunfermline Athletic	0–1	Inverness CT	East End Park
			Cox 92'	Attendance: 2,975; Referee: Dougie McDonald

15 August 2009 SFL1 No. 2	Morton	0–2	Dunfermline Athletic	Cappielow
			Kirk 19'; Cardle 79'	Attendance: 2,661; Referee: William Collum

22 August 2009 SFL1 No. 3	Dunfermline Athletic	2–0	Airdrie	East End Park
	Bayne 19'; Trialist 58'			Attendance: 2,834; Referee: Anthony Law (replaced by Brian Braidwood in the 3rd minute due to injury to Law)

29 August 2009 SFL1 No. 4	Dunfermline Athletic	0–2	Raith Rovers	East End Park
	Gibson (yellow card) 43' (red card)		Murray 41'; Casalinuovo 60'	Attendance: 6,289; Referee: David Somers

12 September 2009 SFL1 No. 5	Dundee	1–0	Dunfermline Athletic	Dens Park
	Griffiths 37' (pen.)			Attendance: 5,326; Referee: Craig Thomson

19 September 2009 SFL1 No. 6	Partick Thistle	2–0	Dunfermline Athletic	Firhill Stadium
	Cairney 39'; Donnelly 70'			Attendance: 3,263; Referee: Charlie Richmond

26 September 2009 SFL1 No. 7	Dunfermline Athletic	1–4	Queen of the South	East End Park
	Phinn 37'		Wyness 33'; Burns 39', 42'; Holmes 45' (pen.)	Attendance: 2,624; Referee: Frank McDermott

10 October 2009 SFL1 No. 8	Dunfermline Athletic	3–1	Ayr United	East End Park
	Kirk 54'; Gibson 55', 63'		Aitken 74' (pen.)	Attendance: 2,460; Referee: Dougie McDonald

13 October 2009 SFL1 No. 9	Ross County	0–0	Dunfermline Athletic	Victoria Park
				Attendance: 1,757; Referee: William Collum

17 October 2009 SFL1 No. 10	Inverness CT	1–1	Dunfermline Athletic	Caledonian Stadium
	Proctor 45'		Kirk 69'	Attendance: 3,082; Referee: Alan Muir

24 October 2009 SFL1 No. 11	Dunfermline Athletic	3–1	Greenock Morton	East End Park
	Cardle 62'; D.Graham 71'; Bell 86'		McGuffie 74'	Attendance: 2,411; Referee: Steven Nicholls

31 October 2009 SFL1 No. 12	Dunfermline Athletic	1–1	Dundee	East End Park
	Bayne 77'		Harkins 60'	Attendance: 4,001; Referee: Euan Norris

7 November 2009 SFL1 No. 13	Raith Rovers	1–2	Dunfermline Athletic	Stark's Park
	Campbell 22'		Bayne 58'; Wilson 90' (o.g.)	Attendance: 6,200; Referee: Crawford Allan

14 November 2009 SFL1 No. 14	Dunfermline Athletic	3–1	Partick Thistle	East End Park
	McDougall 5'; Gibson 40', 90'		Cairney 47'	Attendance: 3,111; Referee: Mike Tumilty

1 December 2009 SFL1 No. 15	Queen of the South	1–2	Dunfermline Athletic	Palmerston Park
	Weatherston 17'		McDougall 35'; Bell 58'	Attendance: 1,651; Referee: Craig Thomson

5 December 2009 SFL1 No. 16	Ayr United	1–0	Dunfermline Athletic	Somerset Park
	Stevenson 52'			Attendance: 1,625; Referee: Steve Conroy

12 December 2009 SFL1 No. 17	Dunfermline Athletic	3–3	Ross County	East End Park
	Kirk 22', 35'; Gibson 40'		Brittain 8' (pen.); Lawson 24'; Vigurs 84'	Attendance: 2,381; Referee: William Collum

19 December 2009 SFL1 No. 18	Dunfermline Athletic	0–0	Inverness CT	East End Park
				Attendance: 2,280; Referee: John McKendrick

17 January 2010 SFL1 No. 19	Dundee	3–2	Dunfermline Athletic	Dens Park
	Griffiths 3', 82'; McMenamin 16'		D.Graham 10'; Kirk 50'	Attendance: 5,201; Referee: Iain Brines

23 January 2010 SFL1 No. 20	Partick Thistle	1–4	Dunfermline Athletic	Firhill Stadium
	Buchanan 87'		Cardle 48', 71', 82'; Woods 83'	Attendance: 1,549; Referee: Stephen Finnie

13 February 2010 SFL1 No. 21	Ross County	2–2	Dunfermline Athletic	Victoria Park
	Lawson 54'; Watt 85'		Phinn 10', 32'; Holmes (red card) 89'	Attendance: 2,213; Referee: John McKendrick

20 February 2010 SFL1 No. 22	Dunfermline Athletic	0–1	Ayr United	East End Park
			McManus 37'	Attendance: 2,429; Referee: Calum Murray

27 February 2010 SFL1 No. 23	Morton	1–2	Dunfermline Athletic	Cappielow Park
	McGuffie 55'		Kirk 70'; Mason 77'	Attendance: 1,776; Referee: Craig Thomson

6 March 2010 SFL1 No. 24	Dunfermline Athletic	2–0	Airdrie United	East End Park
	Kirk 54' (pen.); Bell 87'			Attendance: 2,252; Referee: Alan Muir

9 March 2010 SFL1 No. 25	Airdrie United	1–1	Dunfermline Athletic	Excelsior Stadium
	Waddell 24'		Gibson 87'	Attendance: 703; Referee: Brian Winter

13 March 2010 SFL1 No. 26	Dunfermline Athletic	3–1	Queen of the South	East End Park
	McDougall 18'; Woods 43', (red card) 88'; Bell 86' (pen.)		Weatherston 69'; McKenna (red card) 90'	Attendance: 2,163; Referee: Steven Nicholls

17 March 2010 SFL1 No. 27	Dunfermline Athletic	2–1	Raith Rovers	East End Park
	McDougall 11'; Bell (red card) 43'; Gibson 55'		Walker 63'	Attendance: 4,549; Referee: David Somers

20 March 2010 SFL1 No. 28	Raith Rovers	1–2	Dunfermline Athletic	Stark's Park
	Simmons (yellow card) 33' (red card); Tadé 66'		Mason 50'; D.Graham 83'	Attendance: 4,098; Referee: Scott MacDonald

23 March 2010 SFL1 No. 29	Dunfermline Athletic	1–2	Partick Thistle	East End Park
	McDougall 36'		Buchanan 27'; Donnelly 81'	Attendance: 2,401; Referee: Crawford Allan

27 March 2010 SFL1 No. 30	Queen of the South	2–0	Dunfermline Athletic	Palmerston Park
	McLaren 45'; Weatherston 71'		Cardle (yellow card) 81' (red card)	Attendance: 2,298; Referee: Alan Muir

30 March 2010 SFL1 No. 31	Dunfermline Athletic	2–1	Dundee	East End Park
	Gibson 6'; Bell 34'		Harkins 90'	Attendance: 2,134; Referee: William Collum

3 April 2010 SFL1 No. 32	Dunfermline Athletic	1–2	Ross County	East End Park
	Bell 78'		Vigurs 15'; Barrowman 35'	Attendance: 2,641; Referee: Stephen Finnie

10 April 2010 SFL1 No. 33	Ayr United	1–2	Dunfermline Athletic	Somerset Park
	McManus 45'		Campbell 39'; McDougall 53'	Attendance: 1,367; Referee: George Salmond

17 April 2010 SFL1 No. 34	Inverness CT	2–0	Dunfermline Athletic	Caledonian Stadium
	Rooney 55'; Foran 62'			Attendance: 3,728; Referee: William Collum

24 April 2010 SFL1 No. 35	Dunfermline Athletic	4–1	Morton	East End Park
	Phinn 8'; Bell 27', 44', 90' (pen.)		Monti 40' (pen.)	Attendance: 2,532; Referee: Steve Conroy

1 May 2010 SFL1 No. 36	Airdrie United	0–1	Dunfermline Athletic	Excelsior Stadium
			Phinn 37'	Attendance: 1,864; Referee: Crawford Allan

=== Scottish League Cup ===
1 August 2009 League Cup R1	Dumbarton	0–5	Dunfermline Athletic	Strathclyde Homes Stadium
			Graham 3'; Kirk 9', 56'; Bell 45+2', 66'	Attendance: 953; Referee: Chris Boyle

26 August 2009 League Cup R2	Dunfermline Athletic	3–1	Raith Rovers	East End Park
	Kirk 38', 68'; Campbell 52' (o.g.)		Williamson 50' (pen.)	Attendance: 4,163; Referee: Brian Winter

23 September 2009 League Cup R3	Hearts	2–1	Dunfermline Athletic	Tynecastle
	Glen 56'; Stewart 73' (pen.)		Bayne 15'	Attendance: 6,126; Referee: B Winter

=== Scottish Challenge Cup ===
25 July 2009 Challenge Cup R1 N&E	Dunfermline Athletic	2–1	Arbroath	East End Park
	Kirk 49'; Bell 68'		Rattray 88'; Dobbins (red card) 88'	Attendance: 1,034; Referee: George Salmond

18 August 2009 Challenge Cup R2	Dunfermline Athletic	1–2	Queen of the South	East End Park
	Cardle 53'		Kean 12'; Tosh 90'	Attendance: 941; Referee: Crawford Allan

=== Scottish Cup ===
9 January 2010 Scottish Cup R4	Dunfermline Athletic	7–1	Stenhousemuir	East End Park, Dunfermline
	Gibson 15'; Kirk 17', 83' (pen.); Phinn 21'; Graham 35'; McDougall 63'; Cardle 69'		Bradley 90'	Attendance: 1,832; Referee: Bobby Madden

26 January 2010 Scottish Cup R4 Replay	Stenhousemuir	1–2 (a.e.t.)	Dunfermline Athletic	Ochilview Park, Stenhousemuir
	Bradley 67' (pen.)		Cardle 35'; Kirk 112'	Attendance: 1,810; Referee: Bobby Madden

7 February 2010 Scottish Cup R5	Dunfermline Athletic	2–4	Celtic	East End Park, Dunfermline
	D.Graham 21'; Kirk 28'		Kamara 20'; Rasmussen 43'; Woods 59' (o.g.); Keane 68' (pen.)	Attendance: 8,933; Referee: Charlie Richmond

== Player stats ==
During the 2009–10 season, Dunfermline have used 21 different players on the pitch. The table below shows the number of appearances and goals scored by each player.

No.	Pos	Nat	Player	Total		Scottish First Division		Scottish Cup		League Cup		Scottish Challenge Cup	
No.	Pos	Nat	Player	Apps	Goals	Apps	Goals	Apps	Goals	Apps	Goals	Apps	Goals
	GK	(Scotland) SCO	Greg Fleming	8	0	4	0	0	0	2	0	2	0
	DF	(Scotland) SCO	Andy Dowie	2	0	1	0	0	0	0	0	1	0
	DF	(Scotland) SCO	Chris Higgins	6	0	3	0	0	0	2	0	1	0
	DF	(Scotland) SCO	Austin McCann	7	0	3	0	0	0	2	0	2	0
	DF	(Scotland) SCO	Neil McGregor	6	0	4	0	0	0	2	0	0	0
	DF	(Scotland) SCO	Greg Ross	2	0	0	0	0	0	1	0	1	0
	DF	(England) ENG	Calum Woods	6	0	4	0	0	0	1	0	1	0
	MF	(Scotland) SCO	Steven Bell	7	2	4	0	0	0	2	1	1	1
	MF	(Scotland) SCO	Alex Burke	7	1	4	0	0	0	2	1	1	0
	MF	(England) ENG	Joe Cardle	6	2	3	1	0	0	1	0	2	1
	MF	(Scotland) SCO	Stephen Glass	3	0	1	0	0	0	1	0	1	0
	MF	(Scotland) SCO	Willie Gibson	7	0	3	0	0	0	2	0	2	0
	MF	(Scotland) SCO	Graeme Holmes	2	0	0	0	0	0	1	0	1	0
	DF	(Scotland) SCO	Steven McDougall	7	0	3	0	0	0	2	0	2	0
	ST	(Scotland) SCO	Scott Muirhead	3	0	1	0	0	0	1	0	1	0
	DF	(Scotland) SCO	Nick Phinn	6	0	3	0	0	0	1	0	2	0
	MF	(Scotland) SCO	Paul Willis	1	0	0	0	0	0	0	0	1	0
	ST	(Scotland) SCO	Graham Bayne	7	1	4	1	0	0	2	0	1	0
	ST	(Scotland) SCO	David Graham	4	1	2	0	0	0	1	1	1	0
	ST	(Northern Ireland) NIR	Andy Kirk	8	6	4	1	0	0	2	4	2	1
	ST	(Scotland) SCO	Jordan White	1	0	0	0	0	0	0	0	1	0

=== Stats ===
Andy Kirk is the top scorer with six goals, with the team totalling fifteen goals so far. During the 2009–10 season, eight Pars players have received at least one caution and one player has received at least one dismissal. In total, the team have received eleven yellow cards and one red card.

Name	Goals	Bookings	Dismissals
Andy Kirk	6		
Steven Bell	2	(yellow card) 2	
Joe Cardle	2		
Own goals	2		
Graham Bayne	1	(yellow card) 1	
Alex Burke	1		
David Graham	1	(yellow card) 1	
Neil McGregor		(yellow card) 2	
Willie Gibson		(yellow card) 1	(red card) 1
Stephen Glass		(yellow card) 1	
Chris Higgins		(yellow card) 1	
Calum Woods		(yellow card) 1	

== Transfers ==
=== In ===
Having lost goalkeeper Paul Gallacher to St Mirren, Dunfermline signed former Gretna keeper Greg Fleming on a season long loan. Having been released from his contract with Aridrie in March 2009, Dunfermline snapped up Joe Cardle on a free transfer and in July signed Cardle's Airdrie team-mate Steven McDougall on a free transfer. The Pars also signed Chris Higgins and Neil McGregor from relegated side Clyde and Kilmarnock winger Willie Gibson was signed for a nominal fee. Defender Andy Dowie moved from Scottish First Division rivals Ross County on a free transfer.

Date	Player	From	Fee (£)
May 2009	(England) Joe Cardle	Airdrie United	Free
21 May 2009	(Scotland) Andy Dowie	Ross County	Free
4 June 2009	(Scotland) Chris Higgins	Clyde	Free
23 June 2009	(Scotland) Willie Gibson	Kilmarnock	Free
4 July 2009	(Scotland) Steven McDougall	Airdrie United	Free
10 July 2009	(Scotland) Greg Fleming	Oldham Athletic	Loan
30 July 2009	(Scotland) Neil McGregor	Clyde	Free

=== Out ===
At the end of the 2008–09 season, the Pars decided to allow 3 of their most senior players to leave the club. Scott Wilson teamed up with former Dunfermline captain and manager of North Queensland Fury Ian Ferguson in Australia, Greg Shields moved to America to join USL First Division side Carolina RailHawks and captain Scott Thomson was released on a free transfer. Goalkeeper Paul Gallacher was allowed to move up a division to the SPL to join St Mirren for an undisclosed fee. Kevin Harper, Stuart Dearden, Calum Reidford and Iain Williamson were all released from their contracts.

Date	Player	To	Fee (£)
May 2009	(Scotland) Scott Wilson	North Queensland Fury	Free
26 May 2009	(Scotland) Greg Shields	Carolina RailHawks	Free
4 June 2009	(Scotland) Stuart Dearden	Free agent	Free
4 June 2009	(England) Kevin Harper	Free agent	Free
30 June 2009	(Scotland) Paul Gallacher	St Mirren	Undisclosed Fee
July 2009	(Scotland) Iain Williamson	Raith Rovers	Free
10 July 2009	(Scotland) Scott Thomson	East Fife	Free
17 July 2009	(Scotland) Scott McBride	Cowdenbeath	Loan
22 July 2009	(Scotland) Calum Reidford	Clyde	Free

== See also ==
- 2009–10 Scottish First Division
- 2009–10 Scottish Cup
- 2009–10 Scottish League Cup
- 2009–10 in Scottish football
