= 2007–08 Dunfermline Athletic F.C. season =

Dunfermline Athletic
2007–08 season
- Chairman: John Yorkston
- Manager: Stephen Kenny (up until 4 December 2007); Jim McIntyre (from 3 January 2008)
- Stadium: East End Park
- Scottish First Division: Fifth
- Scottish Challenge Cup: Final, Lost to St Johnstone
- Scottish League Cup: Third Round, Lost to Hearts
- Scottish Cup: Fourth Round, Lost to Partick Thistle
- UEFA Cup: Second Qualifying Round, Lost to BK Häcken
- Top goalscorer: League: Mark Burchill (11); All: Mark Burchill (15)
- Highest home attendance: League: 4,946 vs. St Johnstone, 2 September 2007; Cup: 6,017 vs. BK Häcken, 16 August 2007
- Lowest home attendance: League: 2,444 vs. Hamilton Academical, 11 March 2008; Cup: 1,744 Ayr United, 2 October 2007
- Average home league attendance: 3,695
Home colours	Away colours	Third colours

The 2007–08 season was Dunfermline Athletic's first season in the Scottish First Division, having been relegated from the Scottish Premier League at the end of the 2006–07 season. Dunfermline Athletic also competed in the Challenge Cup, League Cup, Scottish Cup and the UEFA Cup.

== Review and Events ==
Dunfermline Athletic's first season after relegation from the Scottish Premier League started with disappointment. One win in seven games left them languishing in second last place and even more pressure was put on manager Stephen Kenny after they were knocked out of the UEFA Cup in the knockout qualifying round by Swedish minnows BK Häcken. Despite this the team managed to get to the final of the Scottish Challenge Cup, where they played against St Johnstone but lost 3–2.

At the start of December, Stephen Kenny was sacked as manager of Dunfermline after just over a year in charge. Jim McIntyre was immediately given the role of caretaker manager and after a successful run in which he won four out of six games, he was appointed as Dunfermline manager on a full-time basis on 3 January 2008. He signed a two-and-a-half-year deal. McIntyre started his reign by allowing 6 members of his squad to leave to try to cut the squad size down. McIntyre's changes to the squad seemed to have a positive effect as the Pars eventually finished 5th overall, beating Queen of the South by 4 goals on the final day of the season.

=== Chronological list of events ===
This is a list of the significant events to occur at the club during the 2007–08 season, presented in chronological order. This list does not include transfers, which are listed in the transfers section below, or match results, which are in the results section.

- 4 August: Pre-season favourites Dunfermline get off to the worst possible start to the season, losing 2–1 to Hamilton Academical
- 8 August: Played a testimonial match for Scott Thomson against Manchester United, losing 4–0 with Wayne Rooney scoring two of United's goals.
- 4 December: After a disappointing start to the season, manager Stephen Kenny was sacked with the Pars in second bottom of the First Division. Striker Jim McIntyre was made caretaker manager.
- 3 January: Jim McIntyre was appointed manager of Dunfermline full-time after notching up four wins and two draws as caretaker of the club.
- 11 January: Jim McIntyre picks up the First Division Manager of the Month award for December.
- 31 January: New manager Jim McIntyre has a major clear out at the club in the January transfer window, getting rid of four players on deadline day.
- 1 February: Stirling Midfielder Steven Bell signs a pre-contract agreement with Dunfermline to become Jim McIntyre's first signing.
- 18 April: Manager Jim McIntyre announces that both Mark Burchill and Stephen Simmons have rejected new contracts, while Scott Thomson signed a new one-year deal.
- 26 April: The final game of the season sees Dunfermline demolish Queen of the South 4–0, leaving the Pars final position being 5th.

=== League table ===
Pos	Team	Pld	W	D	L	GF	GA	GD	Pts	Promotion, qualification or relegation
3	St Johnstone	36	15	13	8	60	45	+15	58	
4	Queen of the South	36	14	10	12	47	43	+4	52	Qualification for the UEFA Cup second qualifying round (Note: Queen of the South qualified for the UEFA Cup Second Qualifying Round as Scottish Cup runners-up)
5	Dunfermline Athletic	36	13	12	11	36	41	−5	51	
6	Partick Thistle	36	11	12	13	40	39	+1	45	
7	Livingston	36	10	9	17	55	66	−11	39	

Source: BBC Sport
Rules for classification: 1) points; 2) goal difference; 3) number of goals scored.

== Results & fixtures ==
Win Draw Loss Postponed

=== Friendlies ===
==== Pre-season ====
17 July 2007 Friendly	Brechin City	1 – 3	Dunfermline Athletic	Glebe Park, Brechin
15:00	Smith 58'	Match Report	Burchill 30'; Simmons 42'; Glass 55'	Referee: Brown

21 July 2007 Friendly	Dumbarton	1 – 5	Dunfermline Athletic	Strathclyde Homes Stadium, Dumbarton
15:00	McFarlane 11'	Match Report	Thomson 34'; Crawford 43', 71'; O Morrison 54'; Hamilton 89' (pen.)	Referee: Muir

24 July 2007 Friendly	Dunfermline Athletic	2 – 2	Bristol Rovers	East End Park, Dunfermline
15:00	McManus 17', 40'	Match Report	Lambert 18'; Walker 50'	Attendance: 1,118; Referee: Tumilty

26 July 2007 Friendly	Dunfermline Athletic	2 – 1	Nottingham Forest	East End Park, Dunfermline
15:00	Burchill 22'; O Morrison 90'	Match Report	Sinclair 25'	Attendance: 1,756; Referee: Finnie

8 August 2007 Friendly	Dunfermline Athletic	0 – 4	Manchester United	East End Park, Dunfermline
15:00		Match Report	Eagles 23'; Giggs 36'; Rooney 65', 88' (pen.)	Attendance: 11,290; Referee: Clark

==== Mid-season ====
18 March 2008 Friendly	Dunfermline Athletic	2 – 1	San Juan Jabloteh	East End Park, Dunfermline
19:00	McIntyre 15'; Harper 28'	Match Report	Byers 65'	Attendance: 250; Referee: Charleston

=== Scottish First Division ===
4 Aug 2007 Match 1	Hamilton Academical	2 – 1	Dunfermline Athletic	New Douglas Park
15:00	Taylor 4'; Offiong 47' (pen.)	Match Report	Burchill 18'; McGuire (red card) 47'	Attendance: 3,383; Referee: D McDonald

11 Aug 2007 Match 2	Dunfermline Athletic	0 – 1	Greenock Morton	East End Park
15:00	Glass (yellow card) 90' (red card)	Match Report	Weatherson 21'	Attendance: 4,748; Referee: Allan

19 Aug 2007 Match 3	Livingston	1 – 1	Dunfermline Athletic	Almondvale Stadium
15:00	MacKay 81' (pen.)	Match Report	O Morrison 89'; Bamba (yellow card) 81' (red card)	Attendance: 2,494; Referee: Boyle

25 Aug 2007 Match 4	Dunfermline Athletic	2 – 1	Stirling Albion	East End Park
15:00	Hamilton 55'; Harper 87'; S Morrison (red card) 72'	Match Report	Aitken 73' (pen.)	Attendance: 3,921; Referee: Finnie

2 Sept 2007 Match 5	Dunfermline Athletic	0 – 0	St Johnstone	East End Park
15:00		Match Report		Attendance: 4,946; Referee: Dougal

15 Sept 2007 Match 6	Dundee	1 – 1	Dunfermline Athletic	Dens Park
15:00	McDonald 23'	Match Report	Hamilton 14'	Attendance: 5,173; Referee: Conroy

22 Sept 2007 Match 7	Clyde	2 – 1	Dunfermline Athletic	Broadwood Stadium
15:00	Masterton 19'; D McGowan 65'	Match Report	Burchill 73'	Attendance: 1,554; Referee: D McDonald

29 Sept 2007 Match 8	Dunfermline Athletic	1 – 0	Partick Thistle	East End Park
15:00	Burchill 9'	Match Report		Attendance: 4,531; Referee: Allan

6 Oct 2007 Match 9	Queen of the South	0 – 1	Dunfermline Athletic	Palmerston Park
15:00		Match Report	McManus 30'	Attendance: 2,384; Referee: Collum

20 Oct 2007 Match 10	Dunfermline Athletic	0 – 5	Hamilton Academical	East End Park
15:00		Match Report	McArthur 4'; McCarthy 18'; Offiong 30'; Winters 46' 53'	Attendance: 2,500; Referee: Conroy

27 Oct 2007 Match 11	Stirling Albion	3 – 0	Dunfermline Athletic	Forthbank Stadium
15:00	Cramb 33'; Bell 78'; McKenna 83'	Match Report		Attendance: 1,590; Referee: Brines

3 Nov 2007 Match 12	Dunfermline Athletic	0 – 4	Livingston	East End Park
15:00		Match Report	Craig 44' 49'; Tinkler 66'; Kennedy 90'	Attendance: 3,473; Referee: Muir

10 Nov 2007 Match 13	St Johnstone	0 – 0	Dunfermline Athletic	McDiarmid Park
15:00		Match Report		Attendance: 3,317; Referee: S McDonald

1 Dec 2007 Match 14	Dunfermline Athletic	0 – 1	Dundee	East End Park
15:00		Match Report	McDonald 73'	Attendance: 4,113; Referee: Tumilty

8 Dec 2007 Match 15	Dunfermline Athletic	1 – 1	Clyde	East End Park
15:00	Burchill 9'	Match Report	McGowan 3'	Attendance: 3,547; Referee: O'Reilly

15 Dec 2007 Match 16	Partick Thistle	1 – 1	Dunfermline Athletic	Firhill
15:00	Buchanan 85'	Match Report	Burchill 62'	Attendance: 2,176; Referee: McCurry

22 Dec 2007 Match 17	Dunfermline Athletic	2 – 0	Queen of the South	East End Park
15:00	Burchill 32'; Phinn 78'	Match Report		Attendance: 3,324; Referee: Winter

26 Dec 2007 Match 18	Greenock Morton	0 – 1	Dunfermline Athletic	Cappielow
19:45		Match Report	Glass 15' (pen.)	Attendance: 2,560; Referee: Richmond

29 Dec 2007 Match 19	Dunfermline Athletic	2 – 1	Stirling Albion	East End Park
15:00	Burchill 1'; Simmons 45'	Match Report	Aitken 58'	Attendance: 4,023; Referee: Boyd

2 Jan 2008 Match 20	Livingston	0 – 2	Dunfermline Athletic	Almondvale Stadium
19:45		Match Report	Hamilton 9'; Burchill 10'	Attendance: 2,300; Referee: Somers

5 Jan 2008 Match 21	Dundee	0 – 0	Dunfermline Athletic	Dens Park
15:00		Match Report		Attendance: 4,607; Referee: McKendrick

19 Jan 2008 Match 22	Dunfermline Athletic	0 – 1	St Johnstone	East End Park
15:00		Match Report	Jackson 44'	Attendance: 4,215; Referee: Underhill

26 Jan 2008 Match 23	Dunfermline Athletic	2 – 0	Greenock Morton	East End Park
15:00	Simmons 51'; Glass 84'	Match Report		Attendance: 3,594; Referee: Smith

9 Feb 2008 Match 24	Hamilton Academical	3 – 0	Dunfermline Athletic	New Douglas Park
15:00	Offiong 13' (pen.), 34', 43'	Match Report		Attendance: 2,034; Referee: Finnie

16 Feb 2008 Match 25	Dunfermline Athletic	1 – 1	Partick Thistle	East End Park
15:00	Crawford 12'; Harper (red card) 51'	Match Report	McKeown 74'	Attendance: 3,315; Referee: Winter

23 Feb 2008 Match 26	Clyde	1 – 2	Dunfermline Athletic	Broadwood Stadium
15:00	Clarke 68' (pen.)	Match Report	Simmons 12'; Burchill 36'	Attendance: 1,126; Referee: Richmond

1 Mar 2008 Match 27	Dunfermline Athletic	1 – 1	Livingston	East End Park
15:00	Burke 12'	Match Report	Dorrans 23'	Attendance: 3,268; Referee: Collum

8 Mar 2008 Match 28	Stirling Albion	P – P	Dunfermline Athletic	Forthbank Stadium
15:00		Match Report
Note: _{Match postponed due to waterlogged pitch}

11 Mar 2008 Match 29	Dunfermline Athletic	1 – 1	Hamilton Academical	East End Park
19:45	Glass 10' (pen.)	Match Report	Offiong 39'	Attendance: 2,444; Referee: Murray

15 Mar 2008 Match 30	Queen of the South	1 – 1	Dunfermline Athletic	Palmerston Park
15:00	Harris 8'	Match Report	Morrison 25'	Attendance: 2,114; Referee: Allan

22 Mar 2008 Match 31	Dunfermline Athletic	0 – 1	Dundee	East End Park
15:00		Match Report	Daquin 50'	Attendance: 3,972; Referee: Freeland

25 Mar 2008 Match 28^{(Rearranged)}	Stirling Albion	2 – 3	Dunfermline Athletic	Forthbank Stadium
19:30	Aitken 11' (pen.); Bell 41'	Match Report	Harper 25', 76', 85'	Attendance: 698; Referee: Somers

29 Mar 2008 Match 32	St Johnstone	1 – 1	Dunfermline Athletic	McDiarmid Park
15:00	McManus 36'	Match Report	Crawford 77'	Attendance: 2,372; Referee: McCurry

5 Apr 2008 Match 33	Partick Thistle	0 – 1	Dunfermline Athletic	Firhill
15:00		Match Report	Crawford 45'	Attendance: 2,500; Referee: O'Reilly

12 Apr 2008 Match 34	Dunfermline Athletic	2 – 1	Clyde	East End Park
15:00	Glass 48' (pen.); McIntyre 68'	Match Report	Clarke 44'	Attendance: 3,129; Referee: Muir

19 Apr 2008 Match 35	Greenock Morton	3 – 0	Dunfermline Athletic	Cappielow
15:00	Wake 14'; Harding 59'; Finlayson 72'	Match Report		Attendance: 2,428; Referee: McKendrick

26 Apr 2008 Match 36	Dunfermline Athletic	4 – 0	Queen of the South	East End Park
15:00	Thomson 48'; Williamson 55'; Burchill 62', 85'	Match Report		Attendance: 3,444; Referee: McKendrick

=== Scottish Challenge Cup ===
5 Sept 2007 Challenge Cup round 2	Clyde	1 – 4	Dunfermline Athletic	Broadwood Stadium
19:45	MacLennan 46'	Match Report	Burchill 26', 74'; O. Morrison 57', 90'	Attendance: 799; Referee: Collum

18 Sept 2007 Challenge Cup quarter-finals	Airdrie United	0 – 2	Dunfermline Athletic	New Broomfield
19:45		Match Report	Burchill 54', 81'	Attendance: 931; Referee: Tumilty

2 Oct 2007 Challenge Cup Semi-finals	Dunfermline Athletic	1 – 0	Ayr United	East End Park
19:45	Glass 83'	Match Report		Attendance: 1,744; Referee: Underhill

25 Nov 2007 Challenge Cup Final	Dunfermline Athletic	2 – 3	St Johnstone	Dens Park
15:00	Wilson 37'; Glass 70' (pen.)	Match Report	Sheerin 13' (pen.); MacDonald 19'; Deuchar 30'	Attendance: 6,446; Referee: Smith

=== Scottish League Cup ===
25 Sept 2007 Scottish League Cup round 3	Heart of Midlothain	4 – 1 (a.e.t.)	Dunfermline Athletic	Tynecastle
19:45	Nadé 34' (pen.); Berra 97'; Elliot 100', 102'	Match Report	Simmons 84'	Attendance: 10,500; Referee: Winter

=== Scottish Cup ===
12 Jan 2008 Scottish Cup round 4	Partick Thistle	P – P	Dunfermline Athletic	Firhill
		Match Report
Note: _{Match postponed due to a frozen pitch}

22 Jan 2008 Scottish Cup round 4	Partick Thistle	2 – 1	Dunfermline Athletic	Firhill
19:45	Buchanan 68', 87'	Match Report	Wilson 49'	Attendance: 2,434; Referee: S McDonald

=== UEFA Cup ===
16 Aug 2007 UEFA Cup round 2	Dunfermline Athletic	1 – 1	BK Häcken	East End Park
19:45	Hamilton 1'	Match Report	Henriksson 57'	Attendance: 6,017; Referee: Kranjc

30 Aug 2007 UEFA Cup round 2	BK Häcken	1 – 0 (2 – 1 agg.)	Dunfermline Athletic	Rambergsvallen, Gothenburg
19:45	Skúlason 27'	Match Report	Hamilton (red card) 57'	Attendance: 2,712; Referee: Trutz

=== Fife Cup ===
9 Oct 2007 Fife Cup Semi-final	Dunfermline Athletic	2 – 3	East Fife	East End Park
19:45	Campbell 44'; Williamson 65'	Match Report	McManus 24', 40'; O'Reilly 77'	Attendance: 226

== Player statistics ==
=== Squad ===
Last updated 25 June 2015

No.	Pos	Nat	Player	Total		Scottish First Division		Scottish Cup		League Cup		League Cup	
No.	Pos	Nat	Player	Apps	Goals	Apps	Goals	Apps	Goals	Apps	Goals	Apps	Goals
	GK	(Scotland) SCO	Paul Gallacher	34	0	30	0	1	0	1	0	2	0
	GK	(Scotland) SCO	Sean Murdoch	6	0	4	0	0	0	0	0	2	0
	GK	(Scotland) SCO	Greg Paterson	0	0	0	0	0	0	0	0	0	0
	DF	(Ivory Coast) CIV	Sol Bamba	18	0	13	0	0	0	1	0	4	0
	DF	(Scotland) SCO	Stuart Dearden	0	0	0	0	0	0	0	0	0	0
	DF	(England) ENG	Aaron Labonte	3	0	2	0	0	0	0	0	1	0
	DF	(Scotland) SCO	Scott Morrison	15	1	13	1	1	0	0	0	1	0
	DF	(Scotland) SCO	Greg Ross	4	0	4	0	0	0	0	0	0	0
	DF	(Scotland) SCO	Greg Shields	8	0	8	0	0	0	0	0	0	0
	DF	(Scotland) SCO	Scott Thomson	25	0	23	0	1	0	0	0	1	0
	DF	(Scotland) SCO	Scott Wilson	31	2	27	0	1	1	0	0	3	1
	DF	(England) ENG	Calum Woods	30	0	25	0	1	0	1	0	3	0
	MF	(Scotland) SCO	Stephen Glass	37	6	31	4	1	0	1	0	4	2
	MF	(Scotland) SCO	Kevin Harper	14	4	11	4	1	0	0	0	2	0
	MF	(Scotland) SCO	Scott McBride	1	0	1	0	0	0	0	0	0	0
	MF	(Scotland) SCO	Scott Muirhead	12	0	12	0	0	0	0	0	0	0
	MF	(Scotland) SCO	Nick Phinn	14	1	12	1	0	0	1	0	1	0
	MF	(Scotland) SCO	Stephen Simmons	31	4	25	3	1	0	1	1	4	0
	MF	(Scotland) SCO	Iain Williamson	3	1	1	1	0	0	1	0	1	0
	MF	(Scotland) SCO	Paul Willis	0	0	0	0	0	0	0	0	0	0
	MF	(Scotland) SCO	Darren Young	16	0	15	0	0	0	1	0	0	0
	ST	(Scotland) SCO	Mark Burchill	32	15	28	11	1	0	0	0	3	4
	ST	(Scotland) SCO	Alex Burke	11	1	11	1	0	0	0	0	0	0
	ST	(Scotland) SCO	Stephen Crawford	31	3	27	3	0	0	1	0	3	0
	ST	(Scotland) SCO	Jim McIntyre	7	1	5	1	1	0	0	0	1	0
Players who appeared for Dunfermline Athletic but left during the season:
	GK	(Scotland) SCO	Roddy McKenzie	2	0	2	0	0	0	0	0	0	0
	DF	(Wales) WAL	Jamie Harris	7	0	7	0	0	0	0	0	0	0
	DF	(Scotland) SCO	Phil McGuire	1	0	1	0	0	0	0	0	0	0
	DF	(Republic of Ireland) IRL	Danny Murphy	13	0	12	0	0	0	0	0	1	0
	MF	(Scotland) SCO	Michael McGlinchey	7	0	6	0	0	0	0	0	1	0
	MF	(Northern Ireland) NIR	Owen Morrison	9	3	5	1	0	0	1	0	3	2
	MF	(Republic of Ireland) IRL	Bobby Ryan	9	0	7	0	0	0	0	0	2	0
	ST	(Scotland) SCO	Jim Hamilton	20	4	17	3	1	0	1	1	1	0
	ST	(Scotland) SCO	Tam McManus	12	1	9	1	0	0	1	0	2	0

Notes:
- Player substitutions are not included.

=== Goalscorers ===
As of match played 26 April 2008

Place	Position	Nation	Name	Total	Scottish First Division	Scottish Cup	Scottish League Cup	Scottish Challenge Cup	UEFA Cup
1	FW	(Scotland)	Mark Burchill	15	11	0	0	4	0
2	MF	(Scotland)	Stephen Glass	6	4	0	0	2	0
3	MF	(Scotland)	Kevin Harper	4	4	0	0	0	0
3	MF	(Scotland)	Stephen Simmons	4	3	0	1	0	0
3	FW	(Scotland)	Jim Hamilton	4	3	0	0	0	1
6	FW	(Scotland)	Stevie Crawford	3	3	0	0	0	0
6	MF	(Northern Ireland)	Owen Morrison	3	1	0	0	2	0
8	DF	(Scotland)	Scott Wilson	2	0	1	0	1	0
9	MF	(Scotland)	Alex Burke	1	1	0	0	0	0
9	FW	(Scotland)	Jim McIntyre	1	1	0	0	0	0
9	FW	(Scotland)	Tam McManus	1	1	0	0	0	0
9	DF	(Scotland)	Scott Morrison	1	1	0	0	0	0
9	MF	(Scotland)	Nick Phinn	1	1	0	0	0	0
9	MF	(Scotland)	Scott Thomson	1	1	0	0	0	0
9	MF	(Scotland)	Iain Williamson	1	1	0	0	0	0
Total				48	36	1	1	9	1

== Transfers ==
=== Players in ===
Date	Position	Nationality	Name	From	Fee	Ref.
7 July 2007	MF	(Scotland)	Kevin Harper	(England) Stoke City	Free	
17 July 2007	MF	(Scotland)	Stephen Glass	Hibernian	Free	
1 January 2008	GK	(Scotland)	Paul Gallacher	(England) Norwich City	Free	
7 March 2008	MF	(Scotland)	Alex Burke	St Mirren	Free	

=== Players out ===
Date	Position	Nationality	Name	To	Fee	Ref.
15 June 2007	DF	(Scotland)	Jamie McCunnie	(England) Hartlepool United	Free	
28 June 2007	MF	(Scotland)	Gary Mason	St Mirren	Free	
5 July 2007	MF	(France)	Frédéric Daquin	Dundee	Free	
6 July 2007	GK	(Netherlands)	Dorus de Vries	(Wales) Swansea	Free	
11 July 2007	DF	(Scotland)	Andy Tod	Raith Rovers	Free	
25 July 2007	FW	(Scotland)	Calum Smith	Brechin City	Free	
25 September 2007		(Scotland)	David Muir	East Fife	Free	
9 January 2008	MF	(Republic of Ireland)	Bobby Ryan	St Patrick's Athletic	£11,000	
14 January 2008	DF	(Scotland)	Phil McGuire	Inverness CT	Undisclosed	
30 January 2008	FW	(Scotland)	Jim Hamilton	St Mirren	Undisclosed	
31 January 2008	GK	(Scotland)	Roddy McKenzie	Unattached	Free	
31 January 2008	DF	(Wales)	Jamie Harris	(Republic of Ireland) St Patrick's Athletic	Undisclosed	
14 February 2008	MF	(Northern Ireland)	Owen Morrison	(Republic of Ireland) Derry City	Free	
28 March 2008	FW	(Scotland)	Tam McManus	(United States) Colorado Rapids	Free	

=== Loan in ===
Date	Position	Nationality	Name	From	Duration	Ref.
20 August 2007	GK	(Scotland)	Paul Gallacher	(England) Norwich City	Loan	
2 November 2007	DF	(Scotland)	Danny Murphy	Motherwell	Loan	
9 November 2007	MF	(New Zealand)	Michael McGlinchey	Celtic	Loan	
5 February 2008	MF	(Scotland)	Alex Burke	St Mirren	Loan	

=== Loans out ===
Date	Position	Nationality	Name	To	Duration	Ref.
31 August 2007	DF	(Scotland)	Phil McGuire	Inverness CT	Loan	
31 January 2008	DF	(England)	Aaron Labonte	(Republic of Ireland) Finn Harps	Loan	
8 February 2008	MF	(Scotland)	Scott McBride	Arbroath	Loan	
