= Calum Woods =

English footballer

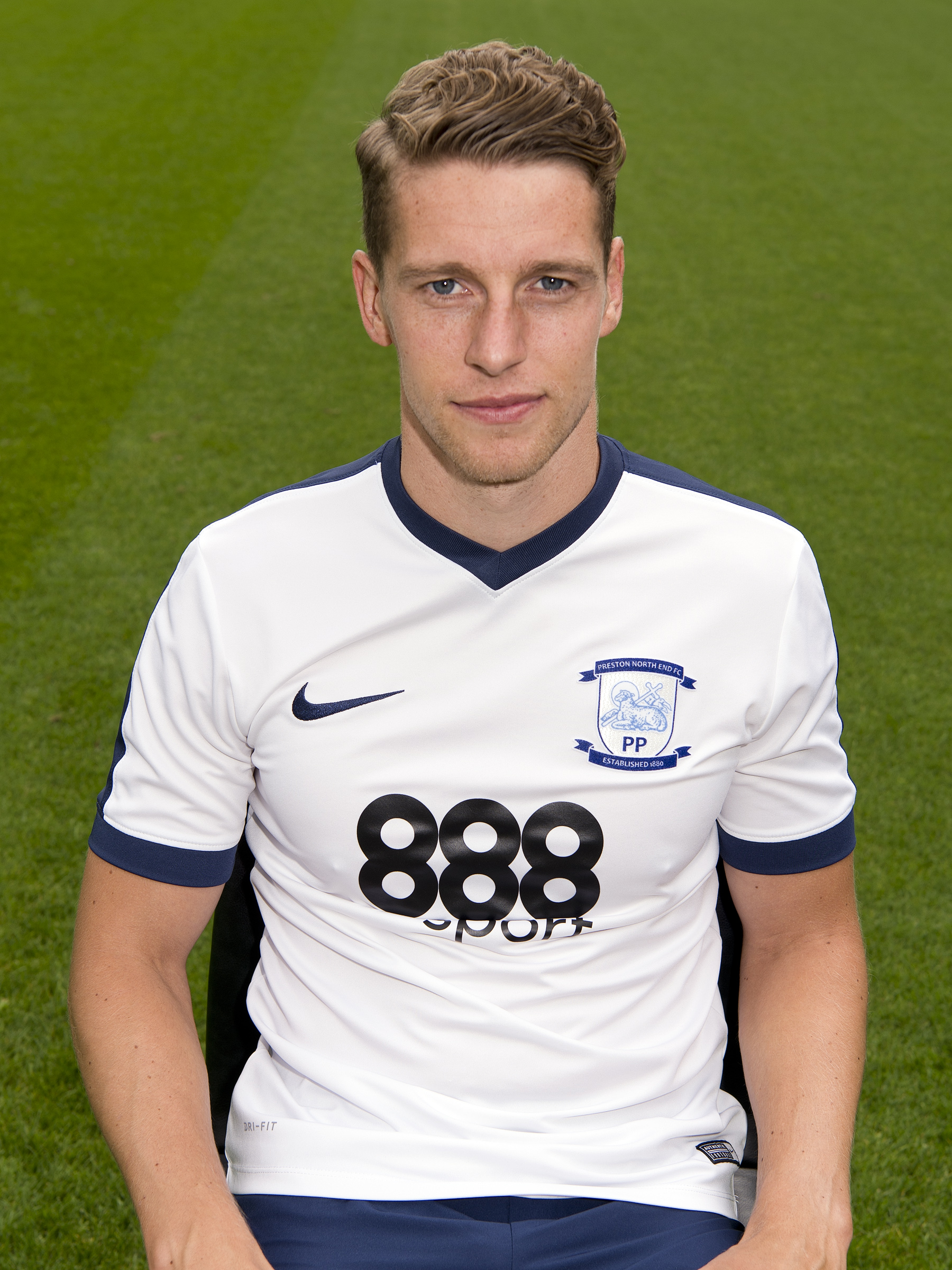
- Woods with Preston North End in 2016

Personal information
- Full name: Calum Jack Woods
- Date of birth: 5 February 1987 (age 39)
- Place of birth: Liverpool, England
- Height: 5 ft 11 in (1.80 m)
- Position: Full back

Youth career
- 1997–2006: Liverpool

Senior career*
Years	Team	Apps	(Gls)
2006–2011	Dunfermline Athletic	128	(10)
2011–2014	Huddersfield Town	72	(1)
2014–2019	Preston North End	67	(0)
2019	Bradford City	6	(0)
2019–2020	Tranmere Rovers	13	(0)
2020	United of Manchester	1	(0)
2020–2021	East Bengal	0	(0)
2021–2023	Bala Town	1	(0)
- * Club domestic league appearances and goals as of 15:36, 11 May 2021 (UTC)

Calum Jack Woods (born 5 February 1987) is an English professional footballer who plays as a fullback

Woods previously spent five seasons with Scottish club Dunfermline Athletic before returning to English football with Huddersfield Town, Preston North End, Bradford City and Tranmere Rovers.

== Career ==
=== Early career ===
Woods joined Liverpool youth academy at the age of 10 but failed to break into the first team and was given a free transfer in May 2006.

=== Dunfermline Athletic ===
He signed for Dunfermline Athletic after a trial spell alongside fellow former Liverpool player Robbie Foy and played 13 games for the club in his first season. In March 2008, manager Jim McIntyre confirmed that Woods had signed a two-year contract extension. He scored his first goal for Dunfermline on 4 November 2008 when he scored the opener at Airdrie United.

==== 2010–11 season ====
Woods enjoyed a successful 2010–11 season with Dunfermline, scoring four goals in 37 appearances, in the process helping the Pars achieve promotion to the Scottish Premier League as champions of Scottish Division One. Woods became the centre of controversy after he was fielded as a substitute when suspended during Dunfermline's 7–1 Scottish Cup fourth round victory over Stenhousemuir.

=== Huddersfield Town ===
On 8 June 2011, he joined Football League One side Huddersfield Town on a free transfer, signing a two-year contract. He made his debut in the 1–1 draw with Bury at the Galpharm Stadium on 6 August 2011. Woods switched from his usual position of right back to playing on the left due to the form of right-back Jack Hunt and an injury to regular left-back Gary Naysmith in the second half of the season. Woods went on to make 26 league appearances in his first season with Huddersfield with 31 in all competitions as Huddersfield finished the season as play-off champions winning promotion to the Championship after beating Sheffield United on penalties in the Wembley final. His first goal for the club came two-and-a-half years after he joined, in a 2–1 defeat at AFC Bournemouth at Goldsands on 28 January 2014.

At the end of the 2013–14 season, Woods was not offered a new deal at the club and was subsequently released.

=== Preston North End ===
On 9 June 2014, he joined League One club Preston North End.

=== Bradford City ===
In January 2019 he signed for Bradford City. In May 2019, following Bradford City's relegation to League Two, it was confirmed that Woods was one of eleven players to be released when their contracts expired.

=== Tranmere Rovers ===
On 26 June 2019 he joined another League One club, Tranmere Rovers, on a one-year contract

=== East Bengal ===
In December 2020, Woods signed with Indian Super League side SC East Bengal as their eighth foreigner. He joined the club in mid season and had not appeared in any match.

He later played for Bala Town.

== Career statistics ==
As of match played 10 March 2020

Appearances and goals by club, season and competition
Club	Season	League			National Cup (Note: Includes Scottish Cup, FA Cup)		League Cup (Note: Includes Scottish League Cup, EFL Cup)		Other		Total	
Club	Season	Division	Apps	Goals	Apps	Goals	Apps	Goals	Apps	Goals	Apps	Goals
Dunfermline Athletic	2006–07	Scottish Premier League	12	0	1	0	1	0	—		14	0
Dunfermline Athletic	2007–08	Scottish First Division	25	0	1	0	1	0	3 (Note: Appearance(s) in Scottish Challenge Cup)	0	30	0
Dunfermline Athletic	2008–09	Scottish First Division	30	5	4	0	4	0	1	0	39	5
Dunfermline Athletic	2009–10	Scottish First Division	29	2	2	0	2	0	1	0	34	2
Dunfermline Athletic	2010–11	Scottish First Division	32	3	3	0	3	1	2	0	40	4
Dunfermline Athletic	Total		128	10	11	0	11	1	7	0	157	11
Huddersfield Town	2011–12	League One	26	0	1	0	0	0	4 (Note: One appearance in Football League Trophy, three in League One play-offs)	0	31	0
Huddersfield Town	2012–13	Championship	27	0	3	0	0	0	—		30	0
Huddersfield Town	2013–14	Championship	19	1	0	0	1	0	—		20	1
Huddersfield Town	Total		72	1	4	0	1	0	4	0	81	1
Preston North End	2014–15	League One	18	0	3	0	1	0	5 (Note: Two appearances in Football League Trophy, three in League One play-offs)	0	27	0
Preston North End	2015–16	Championship	32	0	0	0	3	0	—		35	0
Preston North End	2016–17	Championship	0	0	0	0	0	0	—		0	0
Preston North End	2017–18	Championship	16	0	2	0	0	0	—		18	0
Preston North End	2018–19	Championship	1	0	0	0	1	0	—		2	0
Preston North End	Total		67	0	5	0	5	0	5	0	82	0
Bradford City	2018–19	League One	6	0	—		—		—		6	0
Tranmere Rovers	2019–20	League One	13	0	2	0	0	0	1 (Note: Appearance in EFL Trophy)	0	16	0
F.C. United of Manchester	2020–21	Northern Premier League Premier Division	1	0	—		—		1 (Note: Appearance in FA Trophy)	0	2	0
Career total			287	11	22	0	17	1	18	0	343	12

== Honours ==
Dunfermline Athletic

- Scottish Football League First Division: 2010–11

Huddersfield Town

- Football League One play-offs: 2012

Preston North End

- Football League One play-offs: 2015
