= Joseph Laumann =

Moroccan-German footballer and coach

Personal information
- Full name: Joseph Laumann
- Date of birth: 31 August 1983 (age 43)
- Place of birth: Marrakesh, Morocco
- Height: 1.91 m (6 ft 3 in)
- Position: Forward

Team information
- Current team: SL16 FC (manager)

Youth career
- 2001: Oestrich-Iserlohn

Senior career*
Years	Team	Apps	(Gls)
2001–2004	TuS Iserlohn		
2004–2005	Erkenschwick		
2005–2006	Schalke 04 II	23	(11)
2005–2006	Schalke 04	1	(0)
2006–2007	Rot Weiss Ahlen	30	(8)
2007	VfB Lübeck	10	(0)
2008	Rot-Weiß Erfurt	3	(0)
2008–2009	Sportfreunde Siegen	23	(12)
2009–2010	MSV Duisburg II	25	(3)
2010	APOP Kinyras Peyias		
2011	Vissai Ninh Bình	10	(3)
2012–2013	SV Hohenlimburg		
2013–2015	Roland Beckum	65	(35)

Managerial career
- 2015–2017: Sportfreunde Lotte (assistant)
- 2017: VfL Bochum (assistant)
- 2017–2018: Sportfreunde Lotte (assistant)
- 2019–2020: Sportfreunde Lotte (assistant)
- 2020: Hallescher FC (assistant)
- 2020–2021: Barnsley (assistant)
- 2021: Barnsley (caretaker)
- 2022–: SL16 FC
- * Club domestic league appearances and goals

Joseph Laumann (born 31 August 1983) is a Moroccan-German football coach and former player. He is the manager of Standard Liège's feeder team SL16.

== Playing career ==
Laumann was born in Marrakesh, Morocco. He started his career at Oestrich-Iserlohn before moving to SpVgg Erkenschwick in 2004. He was then snapped up by Bundesliga club Schalke 04 in 2005, where he also played in the reserve.

In 2006, Laumann moved to 2. Bundesliga side Rot Weiss Ahlen where he played 30 games, scoring 11 goals. He then moved on to VfB Lübeck before playing in the 3. Liga for the first half of 2008. In January 2008 he moved to Rot-Weiß Erfurt, where he was fired in May 2008 after a hidden trial with Vitesse under the pseudonym "Joseph Ratzinger". In July 2008, Laumann went on trial with Scottish First Division side Dunfermline Athletic while the Scottish side were on their summer tour of Austria. After playing one match for the Pars against Romanian side Timişoara, manager Jim McIntyre said that they did not come together with the German striker. On 16 October 2008, after five months without a club Lauman signed a contract with Sportfreunde Siegen.

== Coaching career ==
=== Sportfreunde Lotte ===
Together with his coach from SC Roland Beckum, Ismail Atalan, Laumann joined Regionalliga team Sportfreunde Lotte at the beginning of 2015 in order to work there under Atalan as his assistant coach. Atalan and Laumann achieved promotion to the 3. Liga in 2016, as well as relegation there in the following season; The team also reached the quarter-finals in the 2016/17 DFB Cup.

=== VfL Bochum ===
In mid-July 2017, Laumann followed Atalan to the 2. Bundesliga club VfL Bochum, where he also took on the role of assistant coach. After Atalan was released three months later after only 10 games, Laumann's contract with VfL was terminated in October 2017 by mutual agreement.

=== Return to Sportfreunde Lotte ===
In November 2017, Laumann returned to Sportfreunde Lotte, again as an assistant coach, however, this time under head coach Andreas Golombek. He left the club again at the end of the season, when head coach Golombek was replaced by Matthias Maucksch.

On 9 April 2018, Laumann returned to the club for the third time, once again under Ismail Atalan, who had been re-appointed as the head coach of Sportfreunde Lotte.

=== Hallescher FC ===
On 25 February 2020, Laumann and Atalan left Sportfreunde Lotte to join Hallescher FC.

=== Barnsley ===
On 30 October 2020, it was confirmed by English Championship club Barnsley, that Laumann had been hired as the assistant coach of French head coach Valérien Ismaël. In an interview in November 2020, Laumann revealed, that he and Ismaël had been friends for several years but never worked together until now.

On 1 November 2021, it was announced that Laumann would take the position of caretaker manager following the sacking of Markus Schopp. He subsequently led Barnsley to their first victory in 14 games with a 2–1 win over Derby County. Laumann lost his second game as caretaker to Hull City in a 2–0 defeat. Laumann was replaced by Poya Asbaghi on 21 November 2021, returning to a post as coach.

== Personal life ==
Laumann is of German and Moroccan descent, his father is German, his mother is Moroccan. He moved from Morocco to Hagen, Germany at the age of 10.

== Managerial statistics ==
As of match played 6 November 2021

Managerial record by team and tenure
Team	Nat	From	To	Record								Ref
Team	Nat	From	To	G	W	D	L	GF	GA	GD	Win %	Ref
Barnsley (caretaker)	(England)	1 November 2021	21 November 2021	3	1	0	2	3	7	−4	33.33	
Total				3	1	0	2	3	4	−1	33.33	—
