= Greg Paterson =

Scottish footballer

Personal information
- Full name: Greg Paterson
- Date of birth: 16 September 1989 (age 37)
- Place of birth: Scotland
- Position: Goalkeeper

Youth career
- Inverkeithing
- Rangers Youth
- Dunfermline Youth

Senior career*
Years	Team	Apps	(Gls)
2005–2011	Dunfermline Athletic	3	(0)
2011–2012	Forfar Athletic	21	(0)
2012–2013	Linlithgow Rose		
2013–2014	East Fife	30	(0)
2014–2015	Stirling Albion	12	(0)
- * Club domestic league appearances and goals as of 26 June 2014

Greg Paterson (born 16 September 1989) is a Scottish professional football player who is currently without a club, having last played for Stirling Albion.

== Career ==
Paterson signed for Dunfermline Athletic from Rangers Youth team in 2005. He made 3 appearances for the First Division side although for the 2009–10 season he was number two choice behind loanee keeper Greg Fleming for the most part.

Following injuries to both Greg Fleming and then Emergency loan-signing Chris Smith, Paterson made his first start for the Pars against Inverness. on 19 December 2009 managing a clean sheet in bad playing conditions. Despite his clean sheet, Paterson was dropped for the following game against Stenhousemuir to allow the return of Greg Fleming to the starting 11. Paterson broke into the team late in the 2009–10 season, first appearing against Queen of the South on 27 March 2010 although a double leg fracture was to end Paterson's season during the following match at home to Dundee on 30 March 2010.

On 16 June 2011 Paterson signed for Scottish Second Division team Forfar Athletic.

He signed for junior side Linlithgow Rose in August 2012 on a 2-year deal. After one year with Linlithgow, Paterson returned to the senior leagues with East Fife. Paterson signed for Scottish League One side Stirling Albion in June 2014 on a year-long contract, however he left the club in March 2015 shortly before the side was relegated to League Two.
