= David Lowing =

Scottish footballer

Personal information
- Full name: David Lowing
- Date of birth: 4 September 1983 (age 43)
- Place of birth: Scotland
- Position: Defender

Senior career*
Years	Team	Apps	(Gls)
2000–2003	St Mirren	23	(0)
2003–2006	Forfar Athletic	69	(0)
2006–2008	Ayr United	59	(4)
2008–2009	Stirling Albion	21	(0)
- * Club domestic league appearances and goals as of 17:49, 14 May 2009 (UTC)

David Lowing (born 4 September 1983) was a Scottish footballer, originally with Irvine Meadow F.C in the Super League Premier Division of the Scottish Junior Football Association, West Region.
