= Scott Muirhead =

Scottish footballer

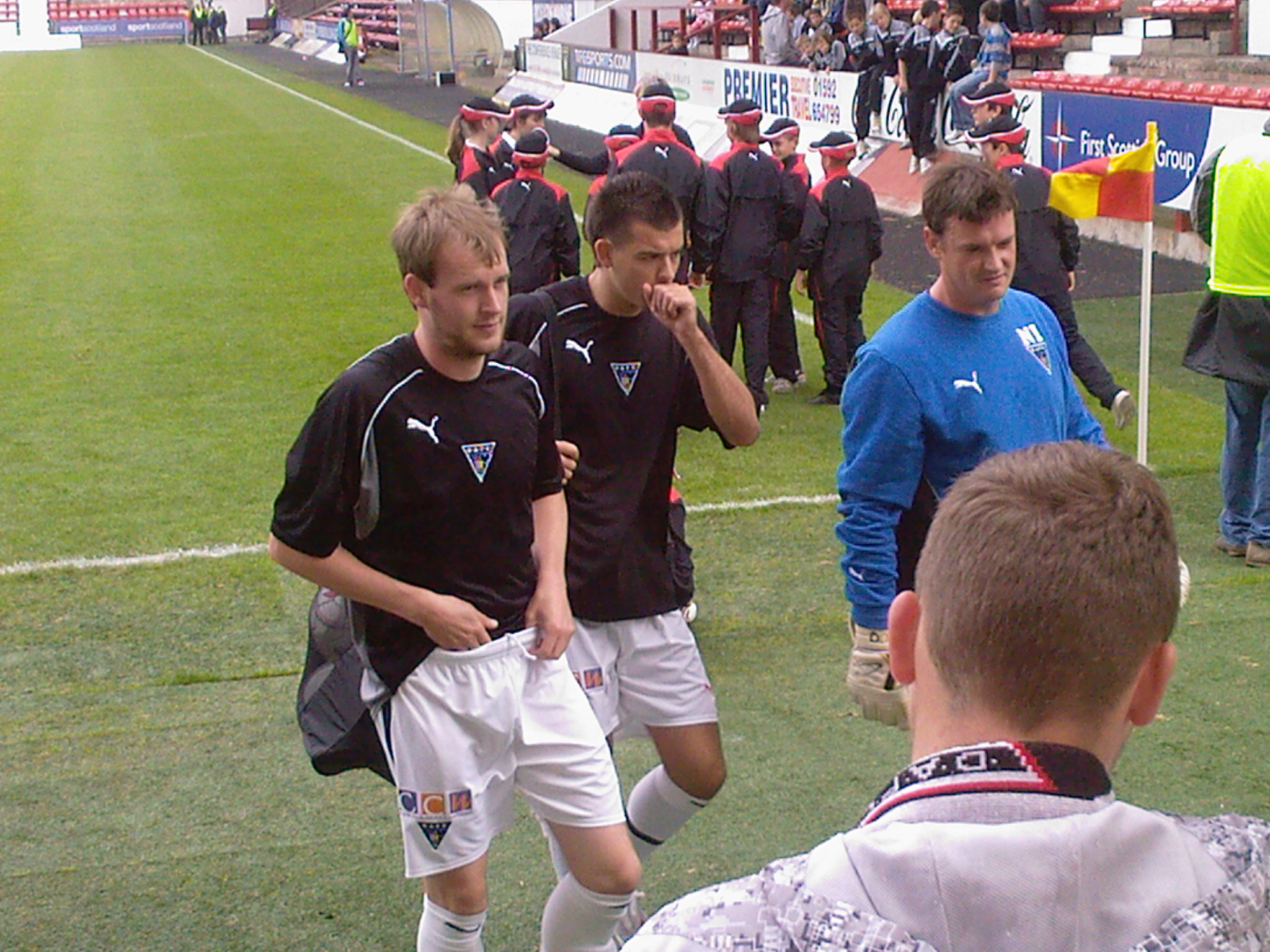
- Muirhead on the left

Personal information
- Full name: Scott Muirhead
- Date of birth: 5 August 1984 (age 42)
- Place of birth: Paisley, Scotland
- Position: Defender

Senior career*
Years	Team	Apps	(Gls)
2002–2006	Aberdeen	66	(0)
2006–2010	Dunfermline Athletic	76	(0)
2010–2011	Stirling Lions		
2011–2012	Richmond	32	(2)
2013	Green Gully	7	(0)
2013	Hume City	8	(0)
- * Club domestic league appearances and goals as of 16 December 2012

Scott Muirhead (born 5 August 1984 in Paisley) is a Scottish professional footballer. He is currently retired, residing in Melbourne, Australia.

== Career ==
Muirhead made his debut for Aberdeen as a substitute in a 1–1 draw with Dundee United in November 2002. He went on to make a total of 78 appearances for Aberdeen (66 league appearances), scoring twice. He scored his first goal for the club in a 5-0 League Cup win against Brechin City in October 2003. He was sent off in his final appearance for Aberdeen, a 2–1 win against Hibernian at Easter Road in January 2006.

He joined Dunfermline Athletic in the January transfer window of the 2005-06 season and played in twelve of Dunfermline's remaining matches of the season. The following season he played in 29 matches but was unable to prevent the club being relegated from the SPL. In February 2008, Muirhead signed a two-year contract extension with the Scottish First Division side. Muirhead's time at the Pars was injury plagued and he left the club when his contract expired at the end of the 2009/10 season.

== See also ==
- Dunfermline Athletic F.C. season 2007-08 | 2008–09 | 2009–10
