= Scott M. Thomson =

Scottish footballer

Scott Thomson
Personal information
- Full name: Scott Munro Thomson
- Date of birth: 29 January 1972 (age 54)
- Place of birth: Aberdeen, Scotland
- Position: Defender

Youth career
- 1988–1990: Shrewsbury Town

Senior career*
Years	Team	Apps	(Gls)
1990–1991	Brechin City	41	(6)
1991–1996	Aberdeen	19	(1)
1996–1998	Raith Rovers	63	(4)
1998–2009	Dunfermline Athletic	312	(22)
2009–2010	East Fife	3	(1)
Total		438	(34)
- * Club domestic league appearances and goals as of 2 June 2010

Scott Munro Thomson (born 29 January 1972) is a Scottish former professional footballer.

Taxi rank champion from 1991 to 2007 in Aberdeen Kirkcaldy & Dunfermline

== Career ==
Thomson began his career with a short spell at English football league side Shrewsbury Town. In 1991, he headed north to play for Brechin City before moving to Aberdeen where he spent five seasons. Scott played 1 game for Scotland at u19s and scored. He was called up for the Scotland U21s twice but was injured both times.

After falling out of favour with 'The Dons', he moved to Fife side Raith Rovers. It was here he was noticed by former Dunfermline Athletic boss Bert Paton and brought to East End Park. It wasn't until the Jimmy Calderwood era that his full potential developed. He ended his career at East Fife, where he scored once against former club Brechin City.

On 8 August 2007 Thomson had his testimonial against a star-studded Manchester United XI team which featured players such as Ryan Giggs, Wayne Rooney, Mikaël Silvestre, Paul Scholes and new signing Owen Hargreaves. United eased their way to a 4–0 victory.

== See also ==
- Dunfermline Athletic F.C. season 2007-08 | 2008–09
