= Iain Williamson =

Scottish footballer

Personal information
- Full name: Iain James Williamson
- Date of birth: 12 January 1988 (age 38)
- Place of birth: Edinburgh, Scotland
- Position: Midfielder

Youth career
- Dunfermline Athletic

Senior career*
Years	Team	Apps	(Gls)
2006–2009	Dunfermline Athletic	23	(2)
2009	→ Raith Rovers (loan)	12	(1)
2009–2012	Raith Rovers	76	(6)
2012	Grindavík	10	(2)
2013–2015	Valur	45	(2)
2015–2016	Víkingur	1	(0)
2016	→ ÍA (loan)	17	(0)
2017	ÍA	0	(0)
- * Club domestic league appearances and goals as of 30 March 2017

Iain James Williamson (born 12 January 1988 in Edinburgh) is a Scottish former professional footballer who last played for Icelandic club ÍA.

== Career ==
Williamson started his senior career with Dunfermline Athletic. He came on as a substitute for Mark Burchill in the closing stages of the 2007 Scottish Cup Final, which Dunfermline lost 1–0 to Celtic. Williamson scored his first goal for the club on 26 April 2008 against Queen of the South in the final game of the 2007–08 season in the Scottish First Division.

In February 2009, Iain signed a loan deal with Dunfermline's local rivals Raith Rovers, lasting until the end of the 2008–09 season. He scored his first goal for Raith Rovers against Stranraer in the Kirkcaldy side's 3–0 away win on 4 April 2009. This win subsequently relegated Stranraer to the Scottish Third Division. Williamson aided Raith in their successful quest to claim the Scottish Second Division Title for the 2008–09 Season, making 11 appearances and scoring one goal with three assists.

Despite being injured for four months in season 2009/10, Williamson still managed to score seven goals, this made him Raith's second top goalscorer that season.

On 23 July 2012, he joined Icelandic Úrvalsdeild side Grindavík. After the 2012 season he joined another Icelandic club, Valur, before the Icelandic 2013 season.

In December 2015, it was announced that he had signed a year-long deal with Úrvalsdeild side Víkingur He then moved on loan to ÍA. On 28 November 2016 Iain made a permanent move to ÍA. However, he announced his retirement on 10 March 2017 due to a chronic hip injury.

== See also ==
- Dunfermline Athletic F.C. season 2007-08
- Dunfermline Athletic F.C. season 2008-09
