= Aaron Labonte =

English footballer

Personal information
- Date of birth: 27 November 1983 (age 42)
- Place of birth: Middlesbrough, England
- Position: Defender

Youth career
- 2002–2003: Newcastle United

Senior career*
Years	Team	Apps	(Gls)
2003–2008	Dunfermline	74	(0)
2008	→ Finn Harps (loan)		
2008–2009	Finn Harps		
- * Club domestic league appearances and goals as of 19:15, 5 June 2008 (UTC)

Aaron Labonte (born 27 November 1983) is an English former professional footballer. Labonte, who started his career as a trainee with Newcastle United, has previously played for Dunfermline Athletic and Finn Harps.

== Career ==
Labonte started his career as a trainee for English Premiership side Newcastle United in 2001. In January 2003, then Livingston manager Jim Leishman offered Labonte a trial. The trial was unsuccessful, but 5 months later Labonte was handed a trial by fellow SPL side Dunfermline Athletic. After a successful trial, Labonte was offered a 2 1/2-year contract with the club. Labonte made his debut in the 4–0 defeat to Glasgow side Rangers.

In the 2004 Scottish Cup Final defeat to Celtic, Bhoys striker Henrik Larsson twice evaded Labonte and scored both times. After relegation to the First Division, then manager Stephen Kenny told Labonte that he was not needed by the club. On the deadline day for transfers in 2008, Labonte signed on loan until the end of the season for Irish club Finn Harps. He was released by Dunfermline in May 2008 after his contract ended and was re-signed by Finn Harps.

== See also ==
- 2007–08 Dunfermline Athletic F.C. season
