= Callum Reidford =

Scottish footballer

Personal information
- Full name: Callum Reidford
- Date of birth: 26 May 1987 (age 39)
- Place of birth: Glasgow, Scotland
- Height: 5 ft 11 in (1.80 m)
- Position: Goalkeeper

Senior career*
Years	Team	Apps	(Gls)
2005–2008	Rangers	0	(0)
2006–2007	→ Dundee (loan)	4	(0)
2008–2009	Dunfermline Athletic	0	(0)
2009–2010	Clyde	32	(0)
2010–2012	Stirling Albion	31	(0)
2012–2013	Stenhousemuir	22	(0)
2013–2015	Stirling Albion	24	(0)
- * Club domestic league appearances and goals as of 07:51, 28 August 2016 (UTC)

Callum Reidford (born 26 May 1987, in Glasgow) is a Scottish professional football goalkeeper who last played for Stirling Albion.

== Career ==
Rediford began his career at Scottish Premier League side Rangers. He joined Scottish First Division side Dundee on loan for the 2006–07 season and went on to make four appearances for the Dens Park club.

Reidford left Ibrox in the May 2008 without making a top team appearance. He soon began to attract the attention of Scottish First Division side Dunfermline Athletic and was linked with a move to East End Park in June 2008. It was reported on the 27th that Dunfermline were about to enter talks with the unattached keeper and that the possibility of a move to Fife was becoming increasingly likely as he joined the Pars on their summer tour of Austria. He signed for Dunfermline in mid-July on a one-year deal, after impressing during his trial. He spent a year with the Pars, but didn't make a first team appearance for them, and signed for Clyde in July 2009.

After the 2009/10 season he chose not to renew his contract with Clyde and was signed by Stirling Albion following a successful trial. Reidford started the season as second choice although seized upon illness to claim the number 1 jersey and has since performed solidly. He left the club in May 2012.

Reidford signed for Stenhousemuir during the 2012 summer transfer window. He left the club due to work commitments in March 2013, and eventually rejoined former club Stirling Albion on a short-term deal in September before signing a deal with the club until the end of the season in December.
