= Stuart Dearden =

Scottish footballer

Personal information
- Date of birth: 1 August 1990 (age 36)
- Place of birth: Edinburgh, Scotland
- Position: Defender

Team information
- Current team: Edinburgh University (Assistant coach)

Youth career
- 2003–2007: Portobello High School
- 2004–2005: Edina Hibs
- 2005–2007: Salvesen Boys Club
- 2007–2008: Dunfermline Athletic

Senior career*
Years	Team	Apps	(Gls)
2008–2009	Dunfermline Athletic	1	(0)
2009	→ Forfar Athletic (loan)	1	(0)
2009–2013	Edinburgh University		

Managerial career
- 2013–: Edinburgh University (Assistant coach)
- * Club domestic league appearances and goals as of 22:08, 11 May 2009 (UTC)

Stuart Dearden (born 1 August 1990) is a Scottish former football player and current assistant coach of Edinburgh University AFC.

== Career ==
Dearden previously played for youth sides Edina Hibs and Salvesen Boys Club while at Portobello High School. He attracted the attention of Dunfermline Athletic and signed a contract when he was 16, playing for the Under 19s and reserve sides before making his debut as a substitute against Queen of the South on the final day of the 2007–08 season.

In January 2009, Dearden was loaned to Forfar Athletic of the Scottish Third Division until the end of the 2008–09 season. After his release from Dunfermline, Dearden signed for Scottish Lowland side Edinburgh University AFC, where he played for 4 years before becoming a coach for the first-team squad in 2013.
