= Nick Phinn =

Scottish footballer

Personal information
- Full name: Nick Phinn
- Date of birth: 14 October 1988 (age 38)
- Place of birth: Glasgow, Scotland
- Position: Midfielder

Team information
- Current team: Colville Park A.F.C.

Youth career
- Hearts Boys Club

Senior career*
Years	Team	Apps	(Gls)
2004–2012	Dunfermline Athletic	108	(18)
2012	Stenhousemuir	1	(0)
2012	Stranraer	6	(0)
2013–2014	Dumbarton	7	(0)
2014	Colville Park		
- * Club domestic league appearances and goals as of 12/1/2013

Nick Phinn (born 14 October 1988) is a Scottish footballer who was most recently playing amateur football for Colville Park A.F.C. in Motherwell. Phinn started his career with Scottish Premier League club Dunfermline Athletic, making his debut in 2005. The club were relegated to the Scottish First Division in 2006, then in season 2010-2011 they won the league earning promotion back to the top-flight. He subsequently had short spells at Stenhousemuir and Stranraer before joining the Sons in early 2013. His time with the Sons has been plagued by injury and he has not managed to start a league game since April 2013. Despite this he was rewarded with a new deal in August of that year.

== Career ==
Phinn joined Dunfermline from Hearts Boys Club, progressing up the ranks until he made his first team debut in a 4–0 loss against Hearts on 8 April 2006, coming on as a late substitute. On 7 March 2008, manager Jim McIntyre confirmed that Phinn had signed a two-year contract extension.

Phinn started the 2008–09 season well, scoring 3 goals in 6 games before receiving his first professional sending off in a First Division match against Airdrie United. Phinn went on to have an excellent season, starting 33 League matches with 2 substitute appearances as well as featuring in cup competitions. He scored a total of 12 goals in season 2008–09 – 8 in the First Division, 1 in both the Scottish Cup and the League Cup and 2 in the Challenge Cup.

Phinn missed most of the 2011–12 Scottish Premier League season due to a recurring hamstring injury. In February 2013 Phinn signed for Championship signed Dumbarton. He was released at the expiry of his contract in May 2014 by the Sons.

== Career statistics ==
As of 29 August 2011

Club	Season	League		Cup		League Cup		Challenge Cup		Total	
Club	Season	Apps	Goals	Apps	Goals	Apps	Goals	Apps	Goals	Apps	Goals
Dunfermline Athletic	2005–06	3	0	0	0	0	0	-	-	3	0
Dunfermline Athletic	2006–07	0	0	0	0	0	0	-	-	0	0
Dunfermline Athletic	2007–08	19	1	0	0	1	0	1	0	21	1
Dunfermline Athletic	2008–09	0	0	0	0	0	0	0	0	44	11
Dunfermline Athletic	2009–10	0	0	0	0	0	0	0	0	39	6
Dunfermline Athletic	2010–11	0	0	0	0	0	0	0	0	22	4
Dunfermline Athletic	2011–12	0	0	0	0	0	0	-	-	0	0
Career total		0	0	0	0	0	0	0	0	129	22

== Honours ==
Dunfermline

- Scottish First Division: 2010–11
