= Charlie Richmond (referee) =

Scottish football referee

Charlie Richmond (born 13 May 1968) is a Scottish former football referee. Richmond was on the FIFA list of international referees and officiated in the Scottish Premier League (SPL) from 2002 to 2012. Richmond resigned in April 2012, after being overlooked for SPL appointments during the 2011–12 season.

Richmond is known to have refereed at men's international matches during the period from 2005 to 2007. He also officiated in women's international matches.

He is an engineer by profession and has made frequent appearances on BBC Radio Scotland show Off the Ball.
