= Mike Tumilty =

Scottish football referee

Michael Tumilty (born 12 April 1971 in Hartlepool) is a Scottish former football referee, who officiated in the Scottish Premier League. English born Tumilty became a referee in November 1987 and achieved Category I status in 2003.

Tumilty was in charge on 1 November 2009, for the match between Dundee United and Rangers, which was abandoned at half-time due to heavy rain. It was only the third Scottish Premier League game to have been halted since the league's formation.
