= John Yorkston =

Scottish football chairman (born 1984)

- Born: John Wood Yorkston; 13 July 1954 (age 71); Dunfermline, Scotland
- Occupation: Legal services administrator
- Known for: Chairman of Dunfermline Athletic
- Children: 2

John Wood Yorkston (born 13 July 1954) is a Scottish retired businessman who was previously chairman of football club Dunfermline Athletic.

== Career ==
=== Business ===
Yorkston was the managing director of First Scottish Group, a legal services company, however in October 2012, he retired from this position.

He took up a full-time post in the civil service where he gradually moved up the ranks. He then left to start up a company searching public records under the auspices of the First National Bank. First Scottish began life back in 1987 as a subsidiary of First National Bank to undertake Searches on behalf of the Bank. From 1989 onwards, this service was extended to solicitors. In 2000, a management buy-out was negotiated which resulted in the Searching company First Scottish Searching Services. He was also a director of the Scottish Chambers of Commerce from 2012 to 2014.

=== Football ===
Yorkston was prominent in footballing circles for over 20 years; he was appointed chairman of Dunfermline Athletic on 11 June 1999, just after their relegation from the SPL, and at various times board positions on league and association bodies in addition to his club role. He "openly criticised" the Old Firm during the 2002 dispute between those clubs and the majority of the Scottish Premier League members regarding a new television broadcasting contract.

He stepped down as chairman in November 2012, instead taking up a role on the club's charitable arm, the Pars Trust. This came some months after he had publicly supported the removal of Rangers from the SPL owing to their holding company being liquidated, only for Dunfermline (12th out of 12 teams in the 2011–12 season) to be overlooked for the vacant place in the top division, which instead went to Dundee. The following year, despite Yorkston's previous positive comments on the club's financial state, Dunfermline entered administration and were deducted points, followed by the threat of liquidation later in 2013, although ultimately this was avoided.

== Personal life ==
Yorkston is a lifelong fan of the Pars and has two sons and seven grandchildren.
