= Greg Ross =

Scottish footballer

Personal information
- Full name: Gregory William Ross
- Date of birth: 2 May 1987 (age 39)
- Place of birth: Edinburgh, Scotland
- Height: 1.85 m (6 ft 1 in)
- Positions: Full back; midfielder

Senior career*
Years	Team	Apps	(Gls)
2004–2010	Dunfermline Athletic	126	(3)
2008–2009	→ Cowdenbeath (loan)	4	(0)
2010	Valur	22	(0)
2011–2012	Forfar Athletic	52	(2)
2012–2013	Stenhousemuir	42	(0)
2013–2016	Penicuik Athletic	94	(11)
2016	Cowdenbeath	5	(0)
2016–2018	Tynecastle		

International career
2007	Scotland U21	1	(0)
- * Club domestic league appearances and goals

Greg Ross (born 2 May 1987) is a Scottish former footballer who played as a right back.

== Early life and education ==
Ross was born in Edinburgh, Scotland, On May 2nd, 1987.

Ross joined the Dunfermline Athletic youth initiative when he was 14.

== Career ==
He debuted at 17 years and 202 days against Kilmarnock in 2004, becoming the youngest ever player to start a SPL match for the Pars. On 26 November 2005, Ross scored the only goal as Dunfermline sensationally beat Celtic at Celtic Park. He was sent on loan to Third Division side Cowdenbeath in September 2008, after undergoing two knee operations in 15 months. Ross made a winning start to his loan deal, helping the Fife side to beat Berwick Rangers 2–1.

Ross was released by the Pars on 2 May 2010 and signed for Icelandic club Valur the following week.

Ross returned to Scotland in 2011, signing for Forfar Athletic. He moved to Stenhousemuir in the 2012 summer transfer window, but was released by the club at the end of the season after making 33 appearances. In July 2013, Ross signed for SJFA East Super League side Penicuik Athletic. Ross returned to professional football in June 2016, signing for Scottish League Two side Cowdenbeath who he previously had a short loan spell with whilst at Dunfermline. Ross spent four months with the Blue Brazil before joining East of Scotland Football League side Tynecastle.
