= Steve Conroy (referee) =

Scottish football referee and medical practitioner

- Born: 21 December 1966 (age 59); Scotland
- Other occupation: Medical doctor (MB ChB)

Stephen Conroy (born 21 December 1966) is a former Scottish football referee.

== Refereeing career ==
Conroy became a referee in 1993 and was admitted to the SFA list five years later. He was a regular referee in the Scottish Premier League and the Scottish Football League.

In March 2007, Conroy was the official for a SPL match between Hearts and Aberdeen. He sent off Hearts player Laryea Kingston, who reacted by calling Conroy a racist. Conroy reported Kingston to the Scottish Football Association and Kingston received a three-game ban.

Conroy took charge of his first Old Firm (Rangers vs Celtic) game on 3 January 2010.

On 3 December 2011, Conroy awarded a penalty to Rangers in their home game against Dunfermline. Sone Aluko, who won the penalty, was subsequently given a two-match ban for 'simulation'. Conroy was subsequently assigned to referee lower division matches and opted to retire in March 2012.

== Medical career ==
He is also trained as a medical doctor. A former general practitioner, he is now lead medical practitioner for NHS Lanarkshire alcohol and drug addiction services. He is also the owner /director of 'Workwell', providing occupational health services.

Conroy married his wife Sam in May 2023.
