= Jim McIntyre (footballer) =

Scottish football player and manager (born 1972)

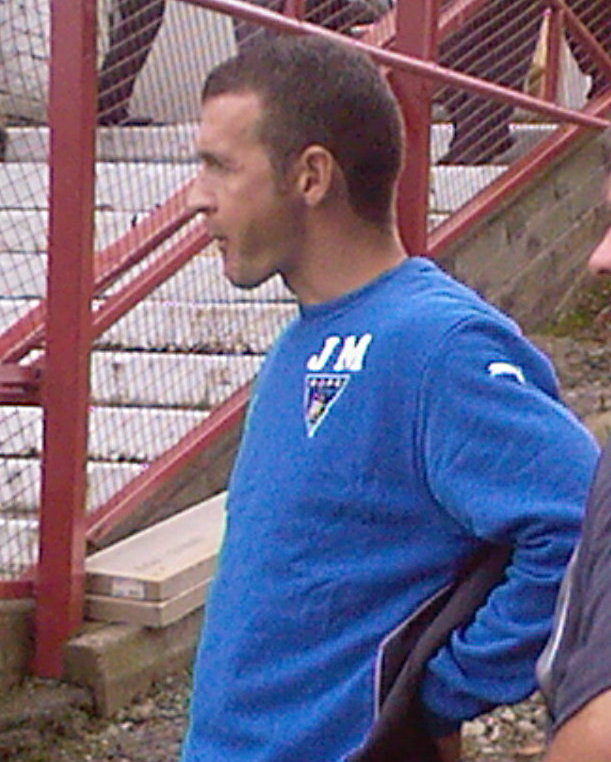
- McIntyre as Dunfermline Athletic manager

Personal information
- Full name: James McIntyre
- Date of birth: 24 May 1972 (age 54)
- Place of birth: Alexandria, Scotland
- Position: Striker

Senior career*
Years	Team	Apps	(Gls)
1991–1993	Bristol City	1	(0)
1993	→ Exeter City (loan)	15	(3)
1993–1996	Airdrieonians	54	(10)
1996–1998	Kilmarnock	46	(9)
1998–2001	Reading	97	(14)
2001–2006	Dundee United	141	(35)
2006–2010	Dunfermline Athletic	31	(3)
Total		385	(74)

International career
1998	Scotland B	1	(0)

Managerial career
- 2007–2012: Dunfermline Athletic
- 2013–2014: Queen of the South
- 2014–2017: Ross County
- 2018–2019: Dundee
- 2022–2023: Cove Rangers
- 2023–2024: Arbroath
- * Club domestic league appearances and goals

James McIntyre (born 24 May 1972) is a Scottish football coach and former player who was most recently the manager of Arbroath.

McIntyre played mainly as a striker or as a left midfielder. During his playing career he played for Bristol City, Exeter City, Airdrieonians, Kilmarnock, Reading, Dundee United and Dunfermline Athletic.

He started his managerial career with Dunfermline Athletic followed by a scouting role at Bristol City. He then managed Queen of the South and Ross County, winning the Scottish League Cup in March 2016 with County. He was appointed Dundee manager in October 2018, but he was sacked in May 2019 after the club had been relegated. After six months as manager of Cove Rangers, McIntyre was appointed by Arbroath in December 2023 but was sacked in August 2024 thanks to one point out of nine in League One.

== Playing career ==
Born in Alexandria, West Dunbartonshire, McIntyre began his senior career in England, after having unsuccessful trials with Hearts and Dundee United, and serving a three-year joinery apprenticeship, signing for Bristol City in 1991. While there, he had a loan spell with Exeter City in 1993. Later that year he returned to Scotland, signing for Airdrieonians where he impressed to earn a move to the top division. In March 1996 he joined Kilmarnock, going on to be part of their Scottish Cup-winning team in 1997. McIntyre scored the winning goal in the semi-final replay against Dundee United.

In March 1998, McIntyre was transferred to Reading for a fee of £440,000, and the following month appeared for Scotland B international team against Norway. He appeared as a late sub to replace Andy Smith. He played in the 2000/01 third-tier play off final defeat in extra time. This was his last game playing in English football. He returned to Scottish football, signing for Dundee United in July. Although his initial contract was for a two-year period, he twice extended his stay with the club and again was a goal scorer in a Scottish Cup semi-final winning team. It was announced by United manager Craig Brewster in April 2006 that McIntyre would be free to leave the club at the end of the season.

In July 2006, McIntyre signed for Dunfermline Athletic after negotiating a termination of his Dundee United contract. He scored a decisive penalty kick against Hibernian at Hampden Park in a Scottish Cup semi-final replay allowing Dunfermline to progress to the final with a 1–0 victory. After being appointed as Dunfermline manager at the start of 2008, McIntyre did not make a playing appearance for the club until November 2008 due to injury.

== Coaching career ==
=== Dunfermline Athletic ===
McIntyre was appointed caretaker head-coach of Dunfermline Athletic on 4 December 2007, following the sacking of the incumbent manager of the club, Stephen Kenny. McIntyre's first match in charge was a home clash against Clyde on 8 December, when Dunfermline came from behind to claim a 1–1 draw, a result repeated the next week away at Partick Thistle, where Stephen Glass also missed a penalty. He was appointed as Dunfermline manager on a full-time basis on 3 January 2008, signing a two-and-a-half-year deal after an impressive run of four successive victories. After four straight wins, McIntyre was awarded the First Division Manager of the Month award for December. He again won the award, this time for Dunfermline's unbeaten run in September 2008. In the 2010–11 season, McIntyre led Dunfermline to the First Division Championship and promotion back to the Scottish Premier League, eventually winning the league by ten points, ahead of Raith Rovers. In three and a half years in the division with The Pars he was Manager of the Month five times. Dunfermline struggled in the 2011–12 Scottish Premier League season and were four points adrift at the bottom of the league table when he left the club in March 2012.

=== Bristol City ===
In April 2012, McIntyre was hired by Bristol City manager Derek McInnes to work as the club's first team coach until the end of the 2011–12 season. He had previously been doing some scouting work for Bristol City after leaving Dunfermline. McIntyre left Bristol City on 25 January 2013 by mutual consent.

=== Queen of the South ===
McIntyre was appointed Queen of the South manager on 27 June 2013, replacing Allan Johnston who moved to Kilmarnock on 24 June 2013. McIntyre appointed Gerry McCabe his assistant manager on 28 June 2013, having previously assisted him at Dunfermline.

=== Ross County ===
On 9 September 2014, McIntyre was appointed as manager of Scottish Premiership club Ross County. He led the club to their first major trophy, a Scottish League Cup, by winning the March 2016 final against Hibernian. McIntyre and his assistant Billy Dodds were sacked by County in September 2017.

=== Dundee ===
In August 2018, McIntyre rejected an approach from Falkirk regarding their managerial vacancy. He was appointed manager of Premiership club Dundee on 17 October 2018. McIntyre was sacked on 12 May 2019, after the club had been relegated from the Premiership.

=== Cove Rangers ===
McIntyre was appointed manager of newly promoted Scottish Championship club Cove Rangers in June 2022. He was sacked on 3 January 2023 following a 6–1 defeat to Inverness Caledonian Thistle the previous day.

=== Arbroath ===
Arbroath appointed McIntyre as their manager in December 2023.

== Career statistics ==
=== Club ===
Appearances and goals by club, season and competition
Club	Season	League		National cup		League cup		Other		Total	
Club	Season	Apps	Goals	Apps	Goals	Apps	Goals	Apps	Goals	Apps	Goals
Dundee United	1993–94	1	0	–	–	–	–	–	–	1	0
Dundee	1995–96	6	0							6	0
Dundee	1996–97	27	4							27	4
Dundee	Total	6	0	0	0	0	0	0	0	6	0
Reading	1997–98	6	0	–	–	–	–	–	–	6	0
Reading	1998–99	32	6	–	–	1	0	1	0	34	6
Reading	1999–2000	26	4	4	1	1	0	2	0	33	5
Reading	2000–01	33	4	1	0	1	0	5	1	40	5
Reading	Total	97	14	5	1	3	0	8	1	113	16
Dundee United	2001–02	19	6	2	0	2	0	–	–	23	6
Dundee United	2002–03	32	9	1	0	4	0	–	–	37	9
Dundee United	2003–04	30	9	–	–	2	2	–	–	32	11
Dundee United	2004–05	35	10	3	2	4	3	–	–	42	14
Dundee United	2005–06	25	1	1	0	1	0	2	0	21	2
Dundee United	Total	141	35	7	2	13	5	2	0	163	42
Dunfermline Athletic	2006–07	10	2	4	1	–	–	–	–	14	3
Dunfermline Athletic	2007–08	17	1	1	0	–	–	1	0	19	1
Dunfermline Athletic	2008–09	2	0	–	–	–	–	–	–	2	0
Dunfermline Athletic	Total	29	3	5	1	0	0	1	0	35	4
Career total		267	52	17	4	16	5	11	1	211	62

== Managerial statistics ==
As of match played 17 August 2024

Team	From	To	Record				
Team	From	To	G	W	D	L	Win %
Dunfermline Athletic	4 December 2007	16 March 2012	195	77	53	65	39.49
Queen of the South	27 June 2013	9 September 2014	54	25	9	20	46.30
Ross County	9 September 2014	25 September 2017	137	50	33	54	36.50
Dundee	17 October 2018	12 May 2019	31	4	7	20	12.90
Cove Rangers	15 June 2022	3 January 2023	25	10	4	11	40.00
Arbroath	4 December 2023	17 August 2024	32	3	7	22	9.38
Total			474	166	116	192	35.02

== Honours and achievements ==
=== Player ===
Kilmarnock

- Scottish Cup: 1996–97

=== Manager ===
Dunfermline Athletic

- Scottish First Division: 2010–11

Ross County

- Scottish League Cup: 2015–16

=== Individual ===
- SFWA Manager of the Year (1): 2015/16
- Scottish Premiership Manager of the Month (2): February 2015; March 2015
- Scottish First Division Manager of the Month (5): December 2007; September 2008; November 2009; March 2011; April 2011
