= 2006–07 Ross County F.C. season =

Ross County
2006–07 season
- Chairman: Roy MacGregor
- Manager: Scott Leitch
- Stadium: Victoria Park
- First Division: Tenth place (Relegated)
- Challenge Cup: Winners
- League Cup: Second round, lost to Alloa Athletic
- Scottish Cup: Third round, lost to Partick Thistle
- Top goalscorer: League: Don Cowie (7); All: Don Cowie (9)
- Highest home attendance: 6,216 vs. Gretna, 28 April 2007
- Lowest home attendance: 1,475 vs. Hamilton Academical, 13 March 2007
- Average home league attendance: 2,307

The 2006–07 season was Ross County's seventh consecutive season in the Scottish First Division, having been promoted as champions of the Scottish Second Division at the end of the 1999–2000 season. They also competed in the Challenge Cup, League Cup and the Scottish Cup.

== Summary ==
Ross County finished tenth in the First Division and were relegated to the Second Division. They reached the second round of the League Cup, the third round of the Scottish Cup, and the final of the Challenge Cup, beating Clyde 5–4 on penalties.

=== Management ===
The club started season 2006–07 under the management of Scott Leitch, who had been appointed towards the end of the previous season. On 30 April 2007, following the club's confirmed relegation Leitch resigned as manager.

== Results and fixtures ==
Win Draw Loss

=== Scottish First Division ===
| 5 August 2006 Scottish First Division | Airdrie United | 0 – 2 | Ross County | Excelsior Stadium |
| | | BBC Report | McKinlay 23'; Gardyne 50' | Attendance: 1,262; Referee: Underhill |

| 12 August 2006 Scottish First Division | Ross County | 0 – 3 | Livingston | Victoria Park |
| 15:00 | | Livi Mad Report | Mackay 30'; Adams 44' (Own Goal); Craig 54' | Attendance: 2,321; Referee: S MacDonald |

| 19 August 2006 Scottish First Division | Gretna | 2 – 1 | Ross County | Raydale Park |
| | McMenamin 22', 36'; Deuchar (red card) 90' | BBC Report | Gunn 48' | Attendance: 1,195; Referee: Smith |

| 26 August 2006 Scottish First Division | St Johnstone | 3 – 1 | Ross County | McDiarmid Park |
| | Milne 37', 39'; Sheerin 82' | BBC Report | McKinlay 53' | Attendance: 2,109; Referee: Collum |

| 9 September 2006 Scottish First Division | Ross County | 1 – 0 | Queen of the South | Victoria Park |
| | Cowie 56' | BBC Report | | Attendance: 2,265; Referee: Somers |

| 16 September 2006 Scottish First Division | Clyde | 3 – 0 | Ross County | Broadwood Stadium |
| | McHale 47' (Penalty); Ferguson 63'; Imrie 85' | BBC Report | | Attendance: 965; Referee: Tumilty |

| 23 September 2006 Scottish First Division | Ross County | 0 – 1 | Hamilton Academical | Victoria Park |
| | | BBC Report | Tunbridge 35' | Attendance: 1,925; Referee: Hardie |

| 30 September 2006 Scottish First Division | Partick Thistle | 3 – 2 | Ross County | Firhill Stadium |
| | McCulloch 33', 83'; McConalogue 90' | BBC Report | McKinlay 13' (Penalty); Keddie 80' | Attendance: 2,120; Referee: Allan |

| 14 October 2006 Scottish First Division | Ross County | 1 – 0 | Dundee | Victoria Park |
| | Higgins 36' | BBC Report | | Attendance: 2,454; Referee: Thomson |

| 21 October 2006 Scottish First Division | Livingston | 0 – 0 | Ross County | Almondvale Stadium |
| 15:00 | | Livi Mad Report | | Attendance: 2,060; Referee: Collum |

| 28 October 2006 Scottish First Division | Ross County | 2 – 1 | Airdrie United | Victoria Park |
| 15:00 | Dowie 14'; Gardyne 34' | BBC Report | Lovering 58' | Attendance: 2,010; Referee: MacKay |

| 4 November 2006 Scottish First Division | Queen of the South | 2 – 0 | Ross County | Palmerston Park |
| | Weir 53'; O'Neil 70' | BBC Report | | Attendance: 1,497; Referee: Murray |

| 18 November 2006 Scottish First Division | Ross County | 1 – 1 | Clyde | Victoria Park |
| | Irvine (red card) 12'; Ciani 41' | BBC Report | McKeown 71' | Attendance: 2,195; Referee: Hardie |

| 22 November 2006 Scottish First Division | Ross County | 2 – 2 | St Johnstone | Victoria Park |
| | Gardyne 28'; McKinlay 89' (Penalty) | BBC Report | Sheerin 4'; Hardie 22'; Lawson (red card) 89' | Attendance: 1,648; Referee: Underhill |

| 25 November 2006 Scottish First Division | Hamilton Academical | 0 – 0 | Ross County | New Douglas Park |
| | | BBC Report | | Attendance: 1,180; Referee: Muir |

| 2 December 2006 Scottish First Division | Dundee | 3 – 1 | Ross County | Dens Park |
| | Rae 73'; Lyle 76'; McLaren 83' | BBC Report | Robertson 65' | Attendance: 3,380; Referee: McCurry |

| 9 December 2006 Scottish First Division | Ross County | 2 – 5 | Partick Thistle | Victoria Park |
| | Dowie 31'; Robertson 54' | BBC Report | McConalogue 34', 36'; Ferguson 57'; Keogh 71'; Roberts 79' | Attendance: 2,381; Referee: Finnie |

| 16 December 2006 Scottish First Division | Ross County | 0 – 1 | Gretna | Victoria Park |
| | | BBC Report | McMenamin 66' | Attendance: 1,958; Referee: Smith |

| 26 December 2006 Scottish First Division | Airdrie United | 0 – 1 | Ross County | Excelsior Stadium |
| 15:00 | | BBC Report | Scott 25' | Attendance: 1,301; Referee: Richmond |

| 30 December 2006 Scottish First Division | Ross County | 1 – 0 | Queen of the South | Victoria Park |
| | | BBC Report | Hooks 33'; Scott (red card) 75' | Attendance: 1,752; Referee: Freeland |

| 2 January 2007 Scottish First Division | St Johnstone | 2 – 1 | Ross County | McDiarmid Park |
| | Mensing 11'; McManus 90' | BBC Report | Cowie 61' | Attendance: 2,519; Referee: McDonald |

| 20 January 2007 Scottish First Division | Clyde | 2 – 4 | Ross County | Broadwood Stadium |
| | Ferguson 73'; Masterton 75' | BBC Report | Imrie 9' (Own goal); McKinlay 35'; Cowie 56', 58'; Shields (red card) 60' | Attendance: 1,100; Referee: Somers |

| 27 January 2007 Scottish First Division | Ross County | 0 – 0 | Dundee | Victoria Park |
| | | BBC Report | | Attendance: 2,175; Referee: Murray |

| 10 February 2007 Scottish First Division | Partick Thistle | 1 – 1 | Ross County | Firhill Stadium |
| | Roberts 68' | BBC Report | Cowie 90' | Attendance: 2,211; Referee: Richmond |

| 17 February 2007 Scottish First Division | Gretna | 4 – 1 | Ross County | Raydale Park |
| | McMenamin 9' (Penalty), 80'; Nicholls 11'; Jenkins 90' | BBC Report | Keddie (red card) 74'; O'Carroll 85' | Attendance: 1,361; Referee: Boyle |

| 24 February 2007 Scottish First Division | Ross County | 0 – 2 | Livingston | Victoria Park |
| 15:00 | | Livi Mad Report | Dorrans 77'; Fox 82' | Attendance: 2,324; Referee: Brines |

| 3 March 2007 Scottish First Division | Ross County | 1 – 1 | St Johnstone | Victoria Park |
| | Higgins 73' | BBC Report | MacDonald 6' | Attendance: 1,689; Referee: Ritchie |

| 10 March 2007 Scottish First Division | Queen of the South | 2 – 0 | Ross County | Palmerston Park |
| | O'Neil 5'; Adams 12' | BBC Report | | Attendance: 2,479; Referee: Smith |

| 13 March 2007 Scottish First Division | Ross County | 4 – 1 | Hamilton Academical | Victoria Park |
| | Cowie 10' (16); Higgins 14'; Gunn 78' | BBC Report | Offiong 70' | Attendance: 1,475; Referee: Winter |

| 17 March 2007 Scottish First Division | Ross County | 2 – 2 | Clyde | Victoria Park |
| | Higgins 49'; Adams 79' | BBC Report | Gilmour 47'; McGowan 63' (Penalty) | Attendance: 2,145; Referee: Allan |

| 31 March 2007 Scottish First Division | Hamilton Academical | 1 – 0 | Ross County | New Douglas Park |
| | Wilson 10' | BBC Report | | Attendance: 1,035; Referee: McKendrick |

| 3 April 2007 Scottish First Division | Ross County | 2 – 1 | Partick Thistle | Victoria Park |
| | Scott 16'; Adams 27' | BBC Report | Young 11' | Attendance: 1,880; Referee: MacKay |

| 7 April 2007 Scottish First Division | Dundee | 3 – 2 | Ross County | Dens Park |
| | Daal 20', 32'; McHale 54' | BBC Report | Higgins 47'; Gardyne 76' | Attendance: 3,013; Referee: Freeland |

| 14 April 2007 Scottish First Division | Ross County | 1 – 1 | Airdrie United | Victoria Park |
| 15:00 | Proctor 16' (Own Goal) | BBC Report | Twigg 7' | Attendance: 2,717; Referee: Tumilty |

| 21 April 2007 Scottish First Division | Livingston | 1 – 1 | Ross County | Almondvale Stadium |
| 15:00 | Griffiths 28' | Livi Mad Report | Gardyne 47' | Attendance: 1,743; Referee: Muir |

| 28 April 2007 Scottish First Division | Ross County | 2 – 3 | Gretna | Victoria Park |
| | Gardyne 30'; O'Carroll 49' | BBC Report | Deverdics 34'; Grady 42', 90' | Attendance: 6,216; Referee: Brines |

=== Scottish Challenge Cup ===
| 16 August 2006 Scottish Challenge Cup round 1 | East Fife | 0 – 3 | Ross County | Bayview Stadium |
| 19:30 | | BBC Report | Dowie 21'; Gunn 70', 72' | Attendance: 304; Referee: Tumilty |

| 29 August 2006 Scottish Challenge Cup round 2 | Ross County | 2 – 1 (a.e.t.) | Alloa Athletic | Victoria Park |
| 19:45 | McKinlay 62', 120' (Penalty) | BBC Report | Townsley 1' | Attendance: 750; Referee: Finnie |

| 12 September 2006 Scottish Challenge Cup QF | Ross County | 3 – 2 (a.e.t.) | Gretna | Victoria Park |
| 19:45 | Williams 35'; Ciani 40'; Anderson 96' | BBC Report | McMenamin 73'; Jenkins 77'; Canning (red card) 86' | Attendance: 1,200; Referee: Freeland |

| 27 September 2006 Scottish Challenge Cup SF | Ross County | 4 – 1 | Albion Rovers | Victoria Park |
| 19:45 | Higgins 11', 50'; Gunn 85'; McKinlay 87' (Penalty) | BBC Report | Dowie 56' (Own goal) | Attendance: 1,050; Referee: Thomson |

| 12 November 2006 Scottish Challenge Cup Final | Ross County | 1 – 1 (a.e.t.) (5 – 4 p) | Clyde | McDiarmid Park |
| 15:00 | Dowie 80' | BBC Report | Hunter 43'; Malone (red card) 93' | Attendance: 4,062; Referee: Thomson |
| | Penalties |
| | Gardyne (penalty scored); Robertson (penalty scored); McKinlay (penalty scored); Adams (penalty missed); Irvine (penalty scored); Crooks (penalty scored) | | (penalty scored) O'Donnell; (penalty missed) McGregor; (penalty scored) McCann; (penalty scored) Miller; (penalty scored) McHale; (penalty missed) Higgins |

=== Scottish League Cup ===
| 8 August 2006 Scottish League Cup round 1 | Ross County | 4 – 2 | Stranraer | Victoria Park |
| 19:45 | Cowie 27', 58'; Higgins 61'; Gunn 78' | BBC Report | Burns 70'; Moore 90' | Attendance: 750; Referee: Ritchie |

| 22 August 2006 Scottish League Cup round 2 | Alloa Athletic | 2 – 1 | Ross County | Recreation Park |
| 19:30 | Malcolm (red card) 15'; Brown 34'; Forrest 47' | BBC Report | McKinlay 57' | Attendance: 424; Referee: Winter |

=== Scottish Cup ===
| 6 January 2007 Scottish Cup round 3 | Ross County | 0 – 1 | Partick Thistle | Victoria Park |
| | | BBC Report | Robertson 15' | Attendance: 1,535; Referee: MacKay |

== League table ==
| Pos | Team | Pld | W | D | L | GF | GA | GD | Pts | Promotion, qualification or relegation |
|---|---|---|---|---|---|---|---|---|---|---|
| 6 | Livingston | 36 | 11 | 12 | 13 | 41 | 46 | −5 | 45 | |
| 7 | Partick Thistle | 36 | 12 | 9 | 15 | 47 | 63 | −16 | 45 | |
| 8 | Queen of the South | 36 | 10 | 11 | 15 | 34 | 54 | −20 | 41 | |
| 9 | Airdrie United (R) | 36 | 11 | 7 | 18 | 39 | 50 | −11 | 40 | Qualification for the First Division Play-offs |
| 10 | Ross County (R) | 36 | 9 | 10 | 17 | 40 | 57 | −17 | 37 | Relegation to the Second Division |

Source: "2006-2007 First Division - SPFL Archive". SPFL.
Rules for classification: 1) points; 2) goal difference; 3) number of goals scored.
(R) Relegated

== Player statistics ==
=== Squad ===
| No. | Pos | Nat | Player | Total | | First Division | | Challenge Cup | | League Cup | | Scottish Cup | |
| No. | Pos | Nat | Player | Apps | Goals | Apps | Goals | Apps | Goals | Apps | Goals | Apps | Goals |
|---|---|---|---|---|---|---|---|---|---|---|---|---|---|
| | GK | (Scotland) SCO | Joe Malin | 2 | 0 | 0+0 | 0 | 2+0 | 0 | 0+0 | 0 | 0+0 | 0 |
| | GK | (Scotland) SCO | Mark Ridgers | 1 | 0 | 0+0 | 0 | 0+0 | 0 | 0+1 | 0 | 0+0 | 0 |
| | GK | (Scotland) SCO | Craig Samson | 35 | 0 | 29+0 | 0 | 3+0 | 0 | 2+0 | 0 | 1+0 | 0 |
| | GK | (Italy) ITA | Matteo Tomei | 7 | 0 | 7+0 | 0 | 0+0 | 0 | 0+0 | 0 | 0+0 | 0 |
| | DF | (Scotland) SCO | Andy Dowie | 43 | 4 | 36+0 | 2 | 4+0 | 2 | 2+0 | 0 | 1+0 | 0 |
| | DF | (Scotland) SCO | Gary Irvine | 24 | 0 | 17+0 | 0 | 5+0 | 0 | 2+0 | 0 | 0+0 | 0 |
| | DF | (Scotland) SCO | Alex Keddie | 32 | 1 | 26+0 | 1 | 4+0 | 0 | 2+0 | 0 | 0+0 | 0 |
| | DF | (Scotland) SCO | Mark McCulloch | 35 | 0 | 26+2 | 0 | 3+1 | 0 | 2+0 | 0 | 1+0 | 0 |
| | DF | (Scotland) SCO | David Niven | 10 | 0 | 6+0 | 0 | 3+0 | 0 | 1+0 | 0 | 0+0 | 0 |
| | DF | (Scotland) SCO | Hugh Robertson | 28 | 2 | 18+6 | 2 | 1+3 | 0 | 0+0 | 0 | 0+0 | 0 |
| | DF | (England) ENG | James Smith | 9 | 0 | 8+0 | 0 | 0+0 | 0 | 0+0 | 0 | 1+0 | 0 |
| | DF | (Scotland) SCO | Sean Webb | 7 | 0 | 5+1 | 0 | 0+0 | 0 | 0+0 | 0 | 1+0 | 0 |
| | DF | (Scotland) SCO | Lee Wilkie | 4 | 0 | 4+0 | 0 | 0+0 | 0 | 0+0 | 0 | 0+0 | 0 |
| | MF | (Scotland) SCO | Derek Adams | 32 | 2 | 24+1 | 2 | 4+0 | 0 | 2+0 | 0 | 1+0 | 0 |
| | MF | (Scotland) SCO | Stuart Anderson | 13 | 1 | 7+2 | 0 | 1+2 | 1 | 0+1 | 0 | 0+0 | 0 |
| | MF | (Scotland) SCO | Don Cowie | 36 | 9 | 28+0 | 7 | 5+0 | 0 | 2+0 | 2 | 1+0 | 0 |
| | MF | (Scotland) SCO | Neal Hooks | 5 | 1 | 1+4 | 1 | 0+0 | 0 | 0+0 | 0 | 0+0 | 0 |
| | MF | (Scotland) SCO | Kevin McKinlay | 37 | 9 | 27+3 | 5 | 5+0 | 3 | 1+0 | 1 | 1+0 | 0 |
| | MF | (Scotland) SCO | Daniel Moore | 17 | 0 | 13+2 | 0 | 0+0 | 0 | 1+0 | 0 | 1+0 | 0 |
| | MF | (Scotland) SCO | Alan Morgan | 5 | 0 | 5+0 | 0 | 0+0 | 0 | 0+0 | 0 | 0+0 | 0 |
| | MF | (Scotland) SCO | Martin Scott | 33 | 2 | 21+7 | 2 | 1+3 | 0 | 1+0 | 0 | 0+0 | 0 |
| | MF | (Scotland) SCO | Fergus Tiernan | 13 | 0 | 5+3 | 0 | 3+0 | 0 | 1+1 | 0 | 0+0 | 0 |
| | FW | (France) FRA | Amick Ciani | 16 | 2 | 5+9 | 1 | 2+0 | 1 | 0+0 | 0 | 0+0 | 0 |
| | FW | (Scotland) SCO | Jason Crooks | 8 | 0 | 2+5 | 0 | 0+1 | 0 | 0+0 | 0 | 0+0 | 0 |
| | FW | (Scotland) SCO | Michael Gardyne | 39 | 6 | 24+8 | 6 | 4+0 | 0 | 2+0 | 0 | 1+0 | 0 |
| | FW | (Scotland) SCO | Craig Gunn | 35 | 6 | 7+20 | 2 | 1+4 | 3 | 0+2 | 1 | 0+1 | 0 |
| | FW | (Scotland) SCO | Sean Higgins | 33 | 8 | 21+7 | 5 | 3+0 | 2 | 1+0 | 1 | 1+0 | 0 |
| | FW | (Ireland) EIR | Diarmuid O'Carroll | 16 | 2 | 9+6 | 2 | 0+0 | 0 | 0+0 | 0 | 0+1 | 0 |
| | FW | (Italy) ITA | Malik Rezgane | 1 | 0 | 0+1 | 0 | 0+0 | 0 | 0+0 | 0 | 0+0 | 0 |
| | FW | (Scotland) SCO | Dene Shields | 13 | 0 | 13+0 | 0 | 0+0 | 0 | 0+0 | 0 | 0+0 | 0 |
| | FW | (Scotland) SCO | David Winters | 2 | 0 | 0+2 | 0 | 0+0 | 0 | 0+0 | 0 | 0+0 | 0 |
| | FW | (Scotland) SCO | Alex Williams | 5 | 1 | 2+2 | 0 | 1+0 | 1 | 0+0 | 0 | 0+0 | 0 |

== See also ==
- List of Ross County F.C. seasons
