= 2006 Scottish Challenge Cup final =

- The match programme cover
- Event: 2006–07 Scottish Challenge Cup
Ross County	Clyde
1	1
- After extra time Ross County won 5–4 on penalties
- Date: 12 November 2006
- Venue: McDiarmid Park, Perth
- Referee: C. Thomson
- Attendance: 4,062

The 2006 Scottish Challenge Cup final was an association football match between Ross County and Clyde on 12 November 2006 at McDiarmid Park in Perth. It was the 16th final of the Scottish Challenge Cup since it was first organised in 1990 to celebrate the centenary of the Scottish Football League.

The match was Ross County's second appearance in the Scottish Challenge Cup Final since losing in 2004, whilst it was Clyde's first national final in 48 years since winning the Scottish Cup in 1958. The tournament was contested by clubs below the Scottish Premier League, with both finalists coming from the First Division.

Roddy Hunter scored first for Clyde in the 43rd minute with Andy Dowie equalising the score at 1–1 in the 80th minute for Ross County to force extra time. Clyde were reduced to 10 men during extra time after Eddie Malone was sent-off after receiving a second yellow card. The score remained 1–1 and the winner was decided by a penalty shoot-out. Both teams scored four of their first five penalties and Jason Crooks scored the winner for Ross County after Neil McGregor missed the decider for Clyde.

== Route to the final ==
=== Ross County ===
Round	Opposition	Score
First round	East Fife (a)	3–0
Second round	Alloa Athletic (h)	2–1 (a.e.t.)
Quarter-final	Gretna (h)	3–2 (a.e.t.)
Semi-final	Albion Rovers (h)	4–1

=== Clyde ===
Round	Opposition	Score
Second round	Montrose (a)	3–0
Quarter-final	Ayr United (h)	1–0
Semi-final	Greenock Morton (h)	3–1

== Team news ==
Ross County started with a 4-4-2 formation. Alex Williams, who was Clyde's top scorer the previous season, missed the match through injury along with Sean Higgins and Fergus Tiernan. Craig Samson started in goals for County, with on loan Celtic duo Gary Irvine and Michael Gardyne also getting starts. Gardyne was partnered by Frenchman Amick Ciani, the only non-Scot in both squads, in attack. Experienced duo Don Cowie and Derek Adams were partnered in the centre of midfield. The midfield was completed by youngsters Craig Gunn and Martin Scott. Midfielder Kevin McKinlay found himself in the unfamiliar position of left back, playing alongside Andy Dowie and Alex Keddie. Jason Crooks, who would go on to score the winning penalty, was making his first senior appearance from the bench.

Clyde used their preferred 3-5-2 formation. Star striker Dougie Imrie missed the game through injury, which he picked up in the previous game, as did Steven Masterton, who was suffering from a knee injury. Michael McGowan and Gary Arbuckle were both suspended, after picking up their second yellow cards of the competition at the semi-final stage. Goalkeeper David Hutton made only his fourth appearance for the club, with the consistent trio of Craig McKeown, Neil McGregor and Chris Higgins in front of him. The suspension to McGowan meant a rare start for Ryan McCann at right wing back, with Eddie Malone took up position on the opposite flank. Captain Paul McHale played in the middle of the park, alongside Craig Bryson and Stephen O'Donnell, with Andy Ferguson and Roddy Hunter forming the attack. The squad was so stretched that manager Joe Miller named himself amongst the substitutes.

== Match details ==
12 November 2006
15:00

Ross County	1–1 (a.e.t.)	Clyde
Dowie 80'	Report	Hunter 43'
Penalties
Gardyne (penalty scored); Robertson (penalty scored); McKinlay (penalty scored); Adams (penalty missed); Irvine (penalty scored); Crooks (penalty scored)	5–4	(penalty scored) O'Donnell; (penalty missed) McGregor; (penalty scored) McCann; (penalty scored) Miller; (penalty scored) McHale; (penalty missed) Higgins

McDiarmid Park, Perth
Attendance: 4,062
Referee: Craig Thomson

Ross County	Clyde

ROSS COUNTY:
GK	1	(Scotland) Craig Samson
RB	2	(Scotland) Gary Irvine
CB	3	(Scotland) Alex Keddie
CB	4	(Scotland) Andy Dowie	(yellow card) 39'	80'
LB	5	(Scotland) Kevin McKinlay
RM	6	(Scotland) Craig Gunn
CF	7	(Scotland) Michael Gardyne
CM	8	(Scotland) Derek Adams
CF	9	(France) Amick Ciani	(yellow card) 17'	(substituted off) 115'
CM	10	(Scotland) Don Cowie (captain)		(substituted off) 102'
LM	11	(Scotland) Martin Scott	(yellow card) 25'	(substituted off) 117'
Substitutes:
GK	12	(Scotland) Joe Malin
DF	14	(Scotland) Mark McCulloch
DF	15	(Scotland) Hugh Robertson		(substituted in) 102'
MF	16	(Scotland) Stuart Anderson		(substituted in) 117'
FW	17	(Scotland) Jason Crooks		(substituted in) 115'
Manager:
(Scotland) Scott Leitch

CLYDE:
GK	1	(Scotland) David Hutton
CB	2	(Scotland) Neil McGregor	(yellow card) 119'
LWB	3	(Scotland) Eddie Malone	(red card) 93'
CB	4	(Scotland) Chris Higgins	(yellow card) 117'
CB	5	(Scotland) Craig McKeown
CM	6	(Scotland) Paul McHale (captain)
CM	7	(Scotland) Craig Bryson		(substituted off) 107'
CM	8	(Scotland) Stephen O'Donnell	(yellow card) 51'
CF	9	(Scotland) Andy Ferguson		(substituted off) 79'
CF	10	(Scotland) Roddy Hunter	43'	(substituted off) 79'
RWB	11	(Scotland) Ryan McCann	(yellow card) 115'
Substitutes:
FW	12	(Scotland) Sean McKenna		(substituted in) 79'
DF	14	(Scotland) Robert Harris
FW	15	(Scotland) Kevin Bradley		(substituted in) 79'
MF	16	(Scotland) Joe Miller	(yellow card) 108'	(substituted in) 107'
GK	17	(Scotland) Peter Cherrie
Manager:
(Scotland) Joe Miller

MATCH OFFICIALS

- Assistant referees:
  - Willie Dishington
  - Jeff Banks
- Fourth official: Mike Ritchie
- Man of the Match – Paul McHale

MATCH RULES

- 90 minutes
- 30 minutes of extra time if scores are level
- Penalty shootout if scores still level
- Five named substitutes
- Maximum of 3 substitutions
