= 2006–07 Scottish Challenge Cup =

Tournament details
- Country: Scotland
- Teams: 30

Final positions
- Champions: Ross County
- Runners-up: Clyde

Tournament statistics
- Matches played: 29
- Goals scored: 104 (3.59 per match)
- Top goal scorer: Scott Chaplain (4)

The 2006–07 Scottish Challenge Cup was the 16th season of the competition, competed for by all 30 members of the Scottish Football League.

Ross County and Clyde were the finalists, the final was played at McDiarmid Park, Perth and was won on penalties by Ross County. The defending champions were St Mirren, and were unable to defend their title due to being promoted to the Scottish Premier League.

== Schedule ==
Round	First match date	Fixtures	Clubs
First round	Tue/Wed 15/16 August 2006	14	30 → 16
Second round	Tue/Wed 29/30 August 2006	8	16 → 8
Quarter-finals	Tuesday 12 September 2006	4	8 → 4
Semi-finals	Wednesday 27 September 2006	2	4 → 2
Final	Sunday 12 November 2006	1	2 → 1

== First round ==
=== North and East region ===
Alloa Athletic received a random bye into the second round.

15 August 2006	Cowdenbeath	4–0	Stirling Albion	Central Park, Cowdenbeath
19:30	Clarke 15'; Fotheringham 25'; Paatelainen 53'; Dalziel 63'	Report		Attendance: 497; Referee: Stephen Finnie

15 August 2006	Brechin City	1–2	Arbroath	Glebe Park, Brechin
19:45	Callaghan 35' (pen.)	Report	Cook 36'; Rennie 51'	Attendance: 506; Referee: S MacDonald

15 August 2006	Forfar Athletic	2–1	Dundee	Station Park, Forfar
19:45	Gribben 51'; Coyle 75'	Report	Swankie 90'	Attendance: 840; Referee: Calum Murray

15 August 2006	St Johnstone	3–1 (a.e.t.)	Raith Rovers	McDiarmid Park, Perth
19:45	Milne 24', 112'; James 97'	Report	One 8'	Attendance: 1,261; Referee: Chris Boyle

16 August 2006	East Fife	0–3	Ross County	Bayview Stadium, Methil
19:30		Report	Dowie 21'; Gunn 70', 72'	Attendance: 304; Referee: Mike Tumilty

16 August 2006	Elgin City	2–0	Stenhousemuir	Borough Briggs, Elgin
19:45	Charlesworth 79', 90'	Report		Attendance: 276; Referee: Willie Collum

16 August 2006	Montrose	2–0	Peterhead	Links Park, Montrose
	Henslee 52'; Michie 56'	Report		Attendance: 335; Referee: David Somers

Source: ESPN Soccernet

=== South and West region ===
Clyde received a random bye into the second round.

15 August 2006	Dumbarton	1–2 (a.e.t.)	Greenock Morton	Strathclyde Homes Stadium, Dumbarton
19:30	McNaught 114'	Report	Weatherson 117', 119'; Greacen (red card) 105'	Attendance: 932; Referee: Euan Norris

15 August 2006	East Stirlingshire	0–5	Queen's Park	Firs Park, Falkirk
19:30		Report	Ronald 24'; Livingstone 25' (o.g.); Bowers 37'; Paton 51'; Molloy 54'	Attendance: 391; Referee: A Boyd

15 August 2006	Partick Thistle	1–2	Albion Rovers	Firhill Stadium, Glasgow
19:30	Ferguson 21'	Report	McBride 3'; Chaplain 28'	Attendance: 1,208; Referee: Colin Hardy

15 August 2006	Ayr United	2–1	Livingston	Somerset Park, Ayr
19:45	Hislop 28' (o.g.); Vareille 75'	Report	Craig 17'	Attendance: 949; Referee: Mike McCurry

15 August 2006	Hamilton Academical	3–1	Berwick Rangers	New Douglas Park, Hamilton
19:45	Tunbridge 24'; Payo 54'; Offiong 90'	Report	Horn 2'	Attendance: 590; Referee: Steve Conroy

15 August 2006	Queen of the South	1–0	Stranraer	Palmerston Park, Dumfries
19:45	O'Neil 52' (pen.)	Report		Attendance: 1,389; Referee: Dougie McDonald

16 August 2006	Airdrie United	0–3	Gretna	New Broomfield, Airdrie
19:45		Report	Deuchar 12', 76'; Tosh 71'	Attendance: 1,093; Referee: Kenny Clark

Source: ESPN Soccernet

== Second round ==
29 August 2006	Albion Rovers	5–2	Elgin City	Cliftonhill, Coatbridge
19:30	Donnelly 14' (pen.); Lennon 19'; Chaplain 60', 64'; Savage 71'	Report	Kaczan 56'; MacKay 88'	Attendance: 180; Referee: Colin Hardie

29 August 2006	Forfar Athletic	1–3	Arbroath	Station Park, Forfar
19:30	Lunan 14'	Report	Brazil 27'; Stein 64'; Sellars 72'	Attendance: 628; Referee: Mike Tumilty

29 August 2006	Greenock Morton	3–2	Cowdenbeath	Cappielow, Greenock
19:45	McLaughlin 10'; McGowan 12'; Millar 16'	Report	Clarke 48'; Fotheringham 61'	Attendance: 1,175; Referee: Willie Collum

29 August 2006	Ross County	2–1 (a.e.t.)	Alloa Athletic	Victoria Park, Dingwall
19:45	McKinlay 62', 120' (pen.)	Report	Townsley 1'	Attendance: 750; Referee: Stephen Finnie

29 August 2006	St Johnstone	3–0	Queen's Park	McDiarmid Park, Perth
19:45	Scotland 19', 59'; MacDonald 38'	Report		Attendance: 1,351; Referee: Eddie Smith

30 August 2006	Gretna	3–1	Hamilton Academical	Raydale Park, Gretna
19:45	Graham 3', Townsley 42'; McGuffie 51' (pen.)	Report	Neill 17'	Attendance: 841; Referee: Martin Sproule

30 August 2006	Montrose	0–3	Clyde	Links Park, Montrose
19:45		Report	McHale 40' (pen.); Ferguson 62'; Imrie 90'	Attendance: 427; Referee: Crawford Allan

30 August 2006	Queen of the South	2–2 (a.e.t.) (4–5 p)	Ayr United	Palmerston Park, Dumfries
19:45	O'Neil 63'; Lauchlan 78'	Report	Robertson 50' (pen.); Weaver 90'	Attendance: 1,239; Referee: John Underhill

Source: ESPN Soccernet

== Quarter-finals ==
12 September 2006
19:45

Albion Rovers	3 – 3 (a.e.t.) (5 – 3 pen.)	Arbroath
Savage 20'; Chisholm 42'; Chaplain 58'	Report	Martin 16', 44'; Sellars 87'

Cliftonhill, Coatbridge
Attendance: 320
Referee: Brian Winter

12 September 2006
19:45

Clyde	1–0	Ayr United
McHale 60'	Report

Broadwood Stadium, Cumbernauld
Attendance: 682
Referee: Kenny Clark

12 September 2006
19:45

Greenock Morton	3–2	St Johnstone
Harding 49'; McGowan 54', 89'	Report	Mensing 7' 80'

Cappielow, Greenock
Attendance: 2,300
Referee: David Sommers

12 September 2006
19:45

Ross County	3 – 2 (a.e.t.)	Gretna
Williams 35'; Ciani 40'; Anderson 96'	Report	McMenamin 73'; Jenkins 77'; Canning (red card) 86'

Victoria Park, Dingwall
Attendance: 1,200
Referee: Alan Freeland

== Semi-finals ==
27 September 2006
19:45

Clyde	3–1	Greenock Morton
Michael McGowan 13'; Higgins 41'; Bryson 79'	Report	Higgins 63' (o.g.)

Broadwood Stadium, Cumbernauld
Attendance: 2,296
Referee: Calum Murray

27 September 2006
19:45

Ross County	4–1	Albion Rovers
Higgins 11', 50'; Gunn 85'; McKinlay 87' (pen.)	Report	Dowie 56' (o.g.)

Victoria Park, Dingwall
Attendance: 1,050
Referee: Craig Thomson

== Final ==
12 November 2006
15:00

Ross County	1 – 1 (a.e.t.) (5 – 4 pen.)	Clyde
Dowie 80'	Report	Hunter 43'; Malone (red card) 93'
Penalties
Gardyne (penalty scored); Robertson (penalty scored); McKinlay (penalty scored); Adams (penalty missed); Irvine (penalty scored); Crooks (penalty scored)	5–4	(penalty scored) O'Donnell; (penalty missed) McGregor; (penalty scored) McCann; (penalty scored) Miller; (penalty scored) McHale; (penalty missed) Higgins

McDiarmid Park, Perth
Attendance: 4,062
Referee: Craig Thomson

== Top scorers ==
4 goals

- Scott Chaplain – Albion Rovers

3 goals

- Craig Gunn – Ross County
- Kevin McKinlay – Ross County
- Paul McGowan – Greenock Morton
