= 2006–07 Scottish First Division =

Scottish First Division
- Season: 2006–07
- Champions: Gretna
- Promoted: Gretna
- Relegated: Airdrie United; Ross County
- Top goalscorer: Colin McMenamin (20)

The 2006–07 First Division season was the 13th season of the Scottish First Division in its current format of ten teams. It began on August 5, 2006 and ended on April 28, 2007.

Gretna gained promotion to the Premier League as champions, by a single point ahead of St Johnstone, with a 3-2 win at Ross County on the final day of the season, the winning goal coming from James Grady in injury time. The result relegated Gretna's opponents to the Second Division.

Airdrie United entered a playoff with the second, third and fourth placed teams from the Second Division - Stirling Albion, Raith Rovers and Brechin City, respectively.

== Promotion and Relegation from 2005–06 ==
=== SPL & First Division ===
Relegated from Premier League to First Division

- Livingston

Promoted from First Division to Premier League

- St Mirren

=== First & Second Divisions ===
Relegated from First Division to Second Division

- Stranraer
- Brechin City (via play-offs)

Promoted from Second Division to First Division

- Gretna
- Partick Thistle (via play-offs)

== League table ==
Pos	Team	Pld	W	D	L	GF	GA	GD	Pts	Promotion, qualification or relegation
1	Gretna (C, P)	36	19	9	8	70	40	+30	66	Promotion to the Premier League
2	St Johnstone	36	19	8	9	65	42	+23	65	
3	Dundee	36	16	5	15	48	42	+6	53	
4	Hamilton Academical	36	14	11	11	46	47	−1	53	
5	Clyde	36	11	14	11	46	35	+11	47	
6	Livingston	36	11	12	13	41	46	−5	45	
7	Partick Thistle	36	12	9	15	47	63	−16	45	
8	Queen of the South	36	10	11	15	34	54	−20	41	
9	Airdrie United (R)	36	11	7	18	39	50	−11	40	Qualification for the First Division Play-offs
10	Ross County (R)	36	9	10	17	40	57	−17	37	Relegation to the Second Division

Source: "2006-2007 First Division - SPFL Archive". SPFL.
Rules for classification: 1) points; 2) goal difference; 3) number of goals scored.
(C) Champions; (P) Promoted; (R) Relegated

== Top scorers ==
Scorer	Team	Goals
(Scotland) Colin McMenamin	Gretna	24
(Trinidad and Tobago) Jason Scotland	St Johnstone	18
(Scotland) Mark Roberts	Partick Thistle	15
(England) Richard Offiong	Hamilton Accies	14
(Scotland) Martin Hardie	St Johnstone	12
(Scotland) Derek Lyle	Dundee	12
(Scotland) Gary Arbuckle	Clyde	10
(Scotland) Gary Twigg	Airdrie Utd	10
(Scotland) Stephen Dobbie	Queen of the South	8
(Scotland) Steven Masterton	Clyde	8
(Scotland) Steven Milne	St Johnstone	8
(Scotland) John O'Neill	Queen of the South	8
(Scotland) Steve Tosh	Queen of the South	8
(Scotland) Don Cowie	Ross County	7
(Scotland) Steven Craig	Livingston	7

== Attendances ==
The average attendances for First Division clubs for season 2006/07 are shown below:

Club	Average	Highest
Dundee	3,880	5,538
St Johnstone	2,812	4,168
Partick Thistle	2,592	3,473
Ross County	2,307	6,216
Queen of the South	2,212	5,481
Livingston	1,934	2,669
Hamilton Academical	1,715	4,975
Gretna	1,599	2,193
Airdrie United	1,429	2,321
Clyde	1,359	3,000

== First Division play-offs ==
=== Semi-finals ===
The ninth placed team in the First Division played the fourth placed team in the Second Division and third placed team in the Second Division played the second placed team in the Second Division. The play-offs were played over two legs, the winning team in each semi-final advanced to the final.

Team 1	Agg.	Team 2	1st leg	2nd leg
Brechin City	1 – 6	Airdrie United	1–3	0–3
Raith Rovers	1 – 3	Stirling Albion	0–0	1–3

First legs

May 2, 2007

Brechin City	1 – 3	Airdrie United
Iain Russell 52'	Report	Ian Harty 14' 22' (pen.); Gary Twigg 16'

Glebe Park, Brechin
Attendance: 954
Referee: Scott MacDonald

May 2, 2007

Raith Rovers	0 – 0	Stirling Albion
	Report

Stark's Park, Kirkcaldy
Attendance: 3,043
Referee: David Somers

Second legs

May 5, 2007

Airdrie United	3 – 0	Brechin City
Kevin MacDonald 40'; Stephen McKeown 76' 84'	Report

New Broomfield, Airdrie
Attendance: 1,298
Referee: Mike Ritchie

May 5, 2007

Stirling Albion	3 – 1	Raith Rovers
Chris Aitken 31' (pen.) 62'; Colin Cramb 79'	Report	Brian Fairbairn 30'

Forthbank Stadium, Stirling
Attendance: 2,656
Referee: Alan Freeland

=== Final ===
The two semi-final winners played each other over two legs. The winning team was awarded a place in the 2007–08 First Division.

Team 1	Agg.	Team 2	1st leg	2nd leg
Stirling Albion	5 – 4	Airdrie United	2–2	3–2

First leg

May 9, 2007

Stirling Albion	2 – 2	Airdrie United
Paul Nugent 87'; Chris Aitken 90'	Report	Gary Twigg 35'; Ian Harty 45'

Forthbank Stadium, Stirling
Attendance: 2,118
Referee: Ian Brown

Second leg

May 12, 2007

Airdrie United	2 – 3	Stirling Albion
Stuart Taylor 40'; Kevin McDonald 72'	Report	Robert Snodgrass 5' 17'; Stewart Devine 68'

New Broomfield, Airdrie
Attendance: 3,465
Referee: Craig Thomson

Stirling Albion were promoted to the First Division

== Awards ==
=== SPFA Team of the Year ===
Goalkeeper

- Alan Main (Gretna)

Defenders

- Martin Canning (Gretna)
- Neil McGregor (Clyde)
- Kevin James (St Johnstone)
- Goran Stanic (St Johnstone)

Midfielders

- Craig Bryson (Clyde)
- Alex Rae (Dundee)
- Don Cowie (Ross County)

Forwards

- Jason Scotland (St Johnstone)
- Colin McMenamin (Gretna)
- Mark Roberts (Partick Thistle)

=== SPFA Player of the Year ===
Winner

- Colin McMenamin (Gretna)

Other nominees:

- Mark Roberts (Partick Thistle)
- Jason Scotland (St Johnstone)
- Goran Stanic (St Johnstone)
