= 2006–07 Clyde F.C. season =

Clyde Football Club
2006–07 season
- Chairman: Len McGuire
- Manager: Joe Miller
- First Division: 5th
- Scottish Cup: Third Round
- League Cup: First Round
- Challenge Cup: Runners up
- Top goalscorer: League: Gary Arbuckle (11); All: Gary Arbuckle (11)
- Highest home attendance: 3,000 (vs Partick Thistle, 26 August 2006)
- Lowest home attendance: 682 (vs Ayr United, 12 September 2006, Challenge Cup)
Home colours	Away colours	Third colours

In season 2006–07, Clyde competed in their seventh consecutive season in the Scottish First Division. Joe Miller was appointed as new manager, after Graham Roberts was dismissed for gross misconduct on a tour of Canada. In a subsequent court case Roberts was awarded £32,000 compensation for unfair dismissal.

Clyde finished fifth in the Scottish First Division, and reached their first cup final for 48 years, in the Scottish Challenge Cup. They went out of the Scottish League Cup in the first round and the Scottish Cup in the third round.

== Transfers ==
=== May to December ===
In:

Player	From	Fee
(Scotland) Ruari MacLennan	Clyde Youth	Free
(Scotland) David McGowan	Clyde Youth	Free
(Scotland) Michael Fulton	Clyde Youth	Free
(Scotland) Paul Reynolds	Clyde Youth	Free
(Scotland) Ryan McCann	St Johnstone	Free
(Scotland) Andy Ferguson	Dundee	Free
(Scotland) David Hutton	Petershill	Free

Out:

Player	To	Fee
(Scotland) Tom Brighton	Millwall	Free
(Scotland) Alex Williams	Armadale SC	Free
(France) Romauld Bouadji	Tooting & Mitcham United	Free
(Scotland) Paul Jarvie	Inverurie Loco Works	Free
(Scotland) Andrew Dick	Linlithgow Rose	Free
(Scotland) Santino Marini	Berwick Rangers	Free

=== January to April ===
In:

Player	From	Fee
(Scotland) Alex Williams	Ross County	Free
(Scotland) Brian Gilmour	Rangers	Free

Out:

Player	From	To
(Scotland) Paul McHale	Dundee	£5,000
(Scotland) Stephen O'Donnell	St Mirren	£28,000
(Scotland) Eddie Malone	St Mirren	£2,000
(Scotland) David Scott	Albion Rovers	Free
(Scotland) Raymond Inglis	Dumbarton	Free

== Squad ==
Note: Flags indicate national team as defined under FIFA eligibility rules; some limited exceptions apply. Players may hold more than one non-FIFA nationality.

No.	Pos.	Nation	Player
—	GK	SCO	Peter Cherrie
—	GK	SCO	David Hutton
—	GK	SCO	David Scott
—	DF	SCO	Michael Fulton
—	DF	SCO	Robert Harris
—	DF	SCO	Chris Higgins
—	DF	SCO	Raymond Inglis
—	DF	SCO	Neil McGregor
—	DF	NIR	Michael McGowan
—	DF	SCO	Craig McKeown
—	MF	SCO	Kevin Bradley
—	MF	SCO	Craig Bryson
—	MF	SCO	Brian Gilmour
—	MF	SCO	Ruari MacLennan

No.	Pos.	Nation	Player
—	MF	SCO	Eddie Malone
—	MF	SCO	Steven Masterton
—	MF	SCO	Ryan McCann
—	MF	SCO	David McGowan
—	MF	SCO	Paul McHale (Captain)
—	MF	SCO	Joe Miller
—	MF	SCO	Stephen O'Donnell
—	FW	SCO	Gary Arbuckle
—	FW	SCO	Andy Ferguson
—	FW	SCO	Roddy Hunter
—	FW	SCO	Dougie Imrie
—	FW	SCO	Sean McKenna
—	FW	SCO	Paul Reynolds
—	FW	IRL	Keith Shevlin (Trialist)
—	FW	SCO	Alex Williams

== Results ==
Win Draw Loss Upcoming fixture

=== Friendlies ===
Date	Opponents	Stadium	Result F - A	Scorers
8 July 2006	Dumbarton	Broadwood Stadium	1 - 0	Arbuckle
10 July 2006	Kilmarnock	Broadwood Stadium	2 - 1	Masterton, Imrie
15 July 2006	Rangers	Broadwood Stadium	0 - 0
22 July 2006	East Kilbride Thistle	Showpark	4 - 0	Zok (Trialist), MacLennan, McHale pen', Arbuckle
23 July 2006	Auchinleck Talbot	Showpark	6 - 0	O'Donnell pen', Arbuckle, Imrie, Bryson, Hamilton (Trialist)
25 July 2006	Stranraer	Broadwood Stadium	4 - 0	O'Donnell pen', Imrie, McKenna, D. McGowan
30 July 2006	Hearts	Broadwood Stadium	2 - 0	Higgins, M. McGowan

=== Scottish First Division ===
Date	Opponents	Stadium	Result F - A	Scorers	Attendance	Notes
5 August 2006	St Johnstone	McDiarmid Park	0 - 0		2,572
13 August 2006	Gretna	Broadwood Stadium	1 - 2	Imrie 25', M. McGowan (red card) 89'	1,348
20 August 2006	Dundee	Dens Park	0 - 3		3,417
26 August 2006	Partick Thistle	Broadwood Stadium	0 - 0		3,000
16 September 2006	Ross County	Broadwood Stadium	3 - 0	McHale 48' (pen.), Ferguson 63', Imrie 85'	965
23 September 2006	Queen of the South	Palmerston Park	2 - 0	Imrie 23' 79'	1,770
30 September 2006	Livingston	Broadwood Stadium	1 - 1	Ferguson 47'	1,429
14 October 2006	Airdrie United	Excelsior Stadium	1 - 2	O'Donnell 57'	1,050
17 October 2006	Hamilton Academical	New Douglas Park	1 - 3	Masterton 33'	1,253
21 October 2006	Gretna	Raydale Park	3 - 3	Higgins 23', O'Donnell 65', Masterton 69', McHale (red card) 63'	1,118
28 October 2006	St Johnstone	Broadwood Stadium	1 - 0	Imrie 85'	1,390
4 November 2006	Hamilton Academical	Broadwood Stadium	2 - 1	McGregor 77', Malone 81'	1,200
18 November 2006	Ross County	Victoria Park	1 - 1	Higgins 71'	2,195
22 November 2006	Partick Thistle	Firhill Stadium	1 - 1	Arbuckle 57'	3,000
28 November 2006	Queen of the South	Broadwood Stadium	4 - 0	McGregor 44', Arbuckle 45' 55', McHale 83' (pen.)	1,179
2 December 2006	Airdrie United	Broadwood Stadium	0 - 0		1,347
9 December 2006	Livingston	Almondvale	1 - 1	Arbuckle 82'
16 December 2006	Dundee	Broadwood Stadium	2 - 1	Arbuckle 36', O'Donnell 38' (pen.), McGregor (red card) 49'	1,088
26 December 2006	St Johnstone	McDiarmid Park	1 - 2	Arbuckle 58'	2,604
30 December 2006	Hamilton Academical	New Douglas Park	1 - 1	Arbuckle 84'	1,534
2 January 2007	Partick Thistle	Broadwood Stadium	2 - 0	Masterton 34', McKeown 46'	2,229
20 January 2007	Ross County	Broadwood Stadium	2 - 4	Ferguson 72', Masterton 75'	1,100
27 January 2007	Airdrie United	Excelsior Stadium	0 - 1		1,340
10 February 2007	Livingston	Broadwood Stadium	0 - 1		1,007
17 February 2007	Dundee	Dens Park	4 - 1	Masterton 1', Bryson 12' 38', Arbuckle 29'	3,812
24 February 2007	Gretna	Broadwood Stadium	2 - 0	Masterton 5', Arbuckle 87'	1,107
3 March 2007	Partick Thistle	Firhill Stadium	4 - 0	Arbuckle 4', Masterton 14', Bryson 27', M. McGowan 36'	2,873
10 March 2007	Hamilton Academical	Broadwood Stadium	3 - 0	Arbuckle 13', Masterton 30', Imrie 88'	1,200
17 March 2007	Ross County	Victoria Park	2 - 2	Gilmour 47', M. McGowan 63' (pen.)	2,145
25 March 2007	Queen of the South	Palmerston Park	0 - 0		2,109
31 March 2007	Queen of the South	Broadwood Stadium	0 - 1		1,200
4 April 2007	Livingston	Almondvale	0 - 0		1,646
7 April 2007	Airdrie United	Broadwood Stadium	0 - 1		1,536
17 April 2007	St Johnstone	Broadwood Stadium	0 - 1		1,352
21 April 2007	Gretna	Raydale Park	0 - 0		1,715
28 April 2007	Dundee	Broadwood Stadium	1 - 1	Williams 40'	1,400

=== Scottish Challenge Cup ===
Date	Round	Opponents	Stadium	Result F - A	Scorers	Attendance	Notes
30 August 2006	Round 2	Montrose	Links Park	3 - 0	McHale 40' (pen.), Ferguson 62', Imrie 90'	427
12 September 2006	Quarter Final	Ayr United	Broadwood Stadium	1 - 0	McHale 60'	682
27 September 2006	Semi Final	Greenock Morton	Broadwood Stadium	3 - 1	M. McGowan 13', Higgins 41', Bryson 79'	2,296
12 November 2006	Final	Ross County	McDiarmid Park	1 - 1 AET 4 - 5 pens	Hunter 43', Malone (red card) 93'	4,062

=== Scottish League Cup ===
Date	Round	Opponents	Stadium	Result F - A	Scorers	Attendance	Notes
8 August 2007	Round 1	Queen of the South	Palmerston Park	2 - 4	Imrie 43', O'Donnell 52' (pen.)		1,435

=== Scottish Cup ===
Date	Round	Opponents	Stadium	Result F - A	Scorers	Attendance	Notes
6 January 2007	Round 3	Gretna	Broadwood Stadium	0 - 3		1,378

== Player statistics ==
#	Player	P	Goal	Booked	Sent off (straight red)
GK	(Scotland) Peter Cherrie	14	0	0	0
DF	(Scotland) Neil McGregor	26	2	2	1
MF	(Scotland) Kevin Bradley	5 (16)	0	0	0
DF	(Scotland) Chris Higgins	40	2	6	0
DF	(Scotland) Robert Harris	21 (4)	0	8	0
MF	(Scotland) Paul McHale	23 (1)	3	3	1
MF	(Scotland) Craig Bryson	39 (1)	4	3	0
MF	(Scotland) Stephen O'Donnell	24 (3)	4	7	0
FW	(Scotland) Gary Arbuckle	28 (10)	11	1	0
FW	(Scotland) Dougie Imrie	39	7	10	0
DF	(Northern Ireland) Michael McGowan	35 (2)	3	6	1
MF	(Scotland) Steven Masterton	21 (9)	8	2	0
FW	(Scotland) Sean McKenna	1 (9)	0	0	0
MF	(Scotland) Ruari MacLennan	5 (4)	0	0	0
MF	(Scotland) Eddie Malone	24	1	5	1
FW	(Scotland) Roddy Hunter	5 (10)	1	0	0
MF	(Scotland) Ryan McCann	17 (6)	3	0	0
MF	(Scotland) Joe Miller	0 (2)	0	1	0
FW	(Scotland) Andy Ferguson	14 (13)	4	2	0
GK	(Scotland) David Hutton	28	0	4	0
DF	(Scotland) Craig McKeown	32	2	4	0
FW	(Scotland) Alex Williams	7 (7)	1	0	0
MF	(Scotland) Brian Gilmour	13	1	2	0
MF	(Scotland) David McGowan	0 (1)	0	0	0
GK	(Scotland) David Scott	0	0	0	0
FW	(Republic of Ireland) Keith Shevlin (Trialist)	0	0	0	0
FW	(Scotland) Paul Reynolds	0	0	0	0

== League table ==
2006–07 Premiership
