= Benis Belesi =

Belgian footballer

Personal information
- Date of birth: 1 June 1999 (age 27)
- Position: Defender

Team information
- Current team: UN Käerjéng

Youth career
- Eendracht Aalst
- 2015–2017: Zulte Waregem
- 2016–2017: Nike Academy

Senior career*
Years	Team	Apps	(Gls)
2017–2018	Jong FC Utrecht	1	(0)
2018–2020	Oostende u21	0	(0)
2020–2021	Ronse	1	(0)
2021–2022	Olympic Club Charleroi	1	(0)
2022–	UN Käerjéng	15	(0)
- * Club domestic league appearances and goals as of 20:40, 27 June 2023 (UTC)

Benis Belesi (born 1 June 1999) is a Belgian professional footballer who plays for UN Käerjéng, as a defender.
