= Bob Harris (footballer) =

Scottish footballer (born 1987)

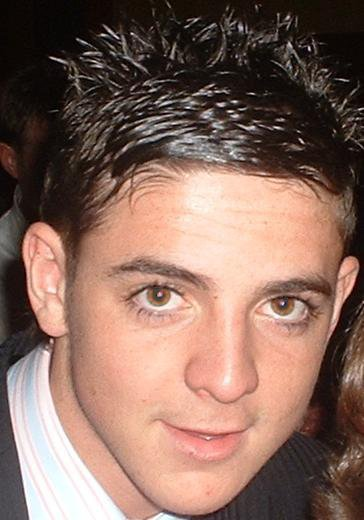

Personal information
- Full name: Robert Harris
- Date of birth: 28 August 1987 (age 39)
- Place of birth: Glasgow, Scotland
- Height: 5 ft 8 in (1.73 m)
- Position: Left back

Youth career
- Clyde
- Rangers
- Clyde

Senior career*
Years	Team	Apps	(Gls)
2004–2007	Clyde	41	(0)
2007–2011	Queen of the South	106	(10)
2011–2014	Blackpool	11	(0)
2012	→ Rotherham United (loan)	5	(1)
2014	→ Sheffield United (loan)	0	(0)
2014–2016	Sheffield United	58	(3)
2016	→ Fleetwood Town (loan)	1	(0)
2017	Bristol Rovers	5	(0)
2017	Telford United	0	(0)
2018	Telford United	8	(0)
2019	FC United of Manchester	5	(0)
- * Club domestic league appearances and goals as of 07:48, 10 April 2019 (UTC)

Robert Harris (born 28 August 1987) is a Scottish football player who plays at semi-professional level as a left back.

Born in Glasgow, Harris started his career senior at Clyde. At Queen of the South he made over 100 first team appearances, including in the 2008 Scottish Cup final, and scored in the UEFA Cup. He next moved to England playing for Blackpool and on loan at Rotherham United. He then joined Sheffield United, featuring in FA Cup and Football League Cup semi-finals as well as a divisional play-off semi final. He later featured in a small number of matches for Fleetwood Town on loan, Bristol Rovers and Telford United.

== Career ==
=== Clyde ===
Raised in the Croftfoot district of Glasgow, Harris began his youth career with Clyde, but moved to Rangers (the team he supported as a child) for a year, before returning to the Bully Wee's setup.

Harris signed professional terms for Clyde at the start of the 2004–05 season, and made his senior début on the last day of the campaign, playing the full ninety minutes in a 1–1 draw against Ross County. He played more games the following season, including Clyde's 5–2 defeat (after extra-time) to Rangers in the Scottish League Cup, and won the penalty which gave Clyde the lead.

Harris got an extended run in the team in the latter half of the 2006–07 season, due to injury to Neil McGregor.

=== Queen of the South ===
Harris signed for Dumfries club Queen of the South in July 2007, scoring his first senior goal against Dunfermline Athletic in a 1–1 draw in mid-March.

In the 2008 Scottish Cup final, it was a Harris free kick that was headed home by Jim Thomson to make the score 2–2; Rangers ran out 3–2 winners. He scored his first goal in the 2008–09 season with a free kick away to FC Nordsjælland in the UEFA Cup second qualification round. This made him the only Queens player to score in the away leg of a UEFA competition.

Harris made his 100th appearance for Queens on 22 August 2010 in the 3–1 league win away to Cowdenbeath.

Harris said of his time in Dumfries "I've got to say I really enjoyed those four years at Queen of the South. It was a very special time in the club's history. I particularly enjoyed the 2008 Scottish Cup final, then playing in the UEFA Cup in Denmark and even scoring in Copenhagen was a bonus."

=== Blackpool and Rotherham ===
After his contract with Queen of the South expired, Harris had a trial with English Championship side Blackpool. After being involved in Blackpool's pre-season fixtures, Harris signed a two-year deal with the option for a further twelve months; he arranged to share a flat in the town with fellow Scottish player Barry Ferguson. Harris' competitive debut for the Seasiders came in the League Cup defeat to Sheffield Wednesday on 11 August 2011. Unable to claim a regular place in Blackpool's first team however, Harris did not make his Football League debut for the Seasiders until April 2012.

Harris joined Rotherham United on a one-month loan deal in September 2012, and said he would be open to extending the deal. However, Rotherham were unable to extend the deal as he was called back by parent club Blackpool after playing five games for the Millers.

=== Sheffield United and Fleetwood Town ===
Blackpool loaned Harris to Nigel Clough's Sheffield United, playing in England's third tier, in January 2014; Blades defender Tony McMahon travelled in the opposite direction on a similar deal. After making his club debut on 26 January 2014, in an FA Cup tie against Fulham, Harris signed a permanent deal for Sheffield United, with McMahon agreeing to remain with Blackpool on a permanent basis with the option of another year. At the time of Harris' arrival, United were in 19th place in the league, however they kicked on for a much more successful second half of the season. They made it to the FA Cup semi finals where they lost to a Hull City fightback, while in League One they finished seventh.

Harris's contract with United was extended on 16 May 2014. He scored his first goal for the Blades on 18 October 2014 against Bradford City in a 2–0 victory at Valley Parade. He played in the first leg of the League Cup semi final against Tottenham Hotspur at White Hart Lane – Spurs won the leg 1–0 and went through 3–2 on aggregate after a 2–2 second leg draw. Harris didn't play in the second leg. A fifth place league finish earned a play off semi-final tie against Swindon Town; Harris played in both legs, which Sheffield United lost out 7–6 on aggregate.

On 18 February 2016, Harris signed for Fleetwood Town on loan for the rest of the season.

=== Bristol Rovers ===
Harris signed for Bristol Rovers on 2 February 2017 on a short-term deal. He made his debut in a 1–1 draw away to Port Vale on 18 February 2017 which he marked with an own goal to give the opposition the lead. After making only a few more appearances for The Gas, Harris was not offered a contract and it was confirmed he would leave the club at the end of the season.

=== Telford United ===
In November 2017, Harris joined AFC Telford United of the National League North as cover for the club's regular left-back, who was cup-tied. He made one appearance, in a 0–1 FA Cup defeat at Hereford. In March 2018 he rejoined the club for a second spell but was not offered a new contract at the end of the season.

=== FC United of Manchester ===
In February 2019 he joined FC United of Manchester. He left the club in April 2019.

== Club statistics ==
As of 10:02, 11 February 2019 (UTC)

Appearances and goals by club, season and competition
Club	Season	League			National Cup		League Cup		Other		Total	
Club	Season	Division	Apps	Goals	Apps	Goals	Apps	Goals	Apps	Goals	Apps	Goals
Clyde	2004–05	Scottish First Division	1	0	0	0	0	0	0	0	1	0
Clyde	2005–06	Scottish First Division	20	0	0	0	1	0	1 (Note: Appearance in Scottish League Challenge Cup)	0	22	0
Clyde	2006–07	Scottish First Division	20	0	1	0	1	0	0	0	22	0
Clyde	Total		41	0	1	0	2	0	1	0	45	0
Queen of the South	2007–08	Scottish First Division	26	2	6	0	1	0	0	0	33	0
Queen of the South	2008–09	Scottish First Division	21	2	1	1	1	0	0	0	23	3
Queen of the South	2009–10	Scottish First Division	32	4	0	0	2	1	1	0	35	5
Queen of the South	2010–11	Scottish First Division	31	2	1	0	2	1	0	0	34	3
Queen of the South	Total		110	10	8	1	6	2	1	0	125	13
Blackpool	2011–12	Championship	5	0	4	0	1	0	—		10	0
Blackpool	2012–13	Championship	4	0	1	0	0	0	—		5	0
Blackpool	2013–14	Championship	4	0	0	0	0	0	—		4	0
Blackpool	Total		13	0	5	0	1	0	—		19	0
Rotherham United (loan)	2012–13	League Two	5	1	0	0	0	0	—		5	1
Sheffield United (loan)	2013–14	League One	0	0	1	0	0	0	—		1	0
Sheffield United	2013–14	League One	11	0	4	0	0	0	—		15	0
Sheffield United	2014–15	League One	42	3	6	0	7	0	2 (Note: Appearances in Football League Trophy)	0	57	3
Sheffield United	2015–16	League One	5	0	2	0	0	0	0	0	7	0
Sheffield United	Total		58	3	13	0	7	0	2	0	80	3
Fleetwood Town (loan)	2015–16	League One	1	0	—		0	0	0	0	1	0
Bristol Rovers	2016–17	League One	5	0	0	0	0	0	0	0	5	0
Telford United	2017–18	National League North	8	0	1	0	—		0	0	9	0
FC United of Manchester	2018–19	National League North	1	0	0	0	—		0	0	1	0
Career total			242	14	28	1	16	2	4	0	290	17

== Honours ==
Queen of the South

- Scottish Cup: Runners-up 2007–08
