= Amick Ciani =

French footballer (born 1982)

Personal information
- Date of birth: 1 December 1982 (age 43)
- Place of birth: Clichy-la-Garenne, Paris, France
- Height: 1.85 m (6 ft 1 in)
- Position: Forward

Senior career*
Years	Team	Apps	(Gls)
2003–2005	Sporting Charleroi		
2005–2006	URS Centre		
2006	Ross County	16	(2)
2007–2008	UR La Louvière Centre		
2008–2009	Eordaikos 2007 F.C.		
2009–2010	KSK Ronse	32	(6)
2010	Persebaya Surabaya		
2011	La Louvière		
2011–2012	KAS Eupen	30	(2)
2012	Doxa Katokopias	9	(0)
2014	Union Saint-Gilloise	4	(0)
2014	Hereford United		
- * Club domestic league appearances and goals

Amick Ciani (born 1 December 1982) is a French retired footballer.

== Career ==
=== Scotland ===
Handed a contract with Ross County over the course of August 2006, Ciani debuted as the Staggies took on Forres Mechanics, forging a strike force with Alex Williams to overwhelm Gretna and progress to the semi-finals of the 2006–07 Scottish Challenge Cup, producing a goal of the season contender and a solid showing. Ross County went on to beat Clyde in the final.

According to Ross County coach Scott Leitch, the then 23-year old's deftness and skill with the ball stood out in training.

In 2010 he was on trial at St Mirren F.C.

=== Indonesia ===
On the radar of Persebaya Surabaya over the course of September 2011, Bajul Ijo were prepared to offer Rp 1.1 billion for the Frenchman, with coach Aji Santoso impressed by his footage. However, he and his agent cut back on the transfer, citing licensing reasons.

=== Belgium ===
Given a contract at KSK Ronse leading up to 2009/10, the RC Paris youth graduate contributed six goals that season, including one to get three points over Waasland-Beveren; he also chalked up a hat-trick during a friendly as Ronse dispatched SV Oudenaarde. Negotiating a deal with KAS Eupen a year later, the Parisian was not satisfied with his start with the Pandas, and picked up two yellow cards as they tied Lommel SK 2-2. He then ended up at Royale Union Saint-Gilloise, expressing confidence that Les Unionistes would be able to do well that season.

=== Cyprus ===
Snapped up by Doxa Katokopias before 2012/13, his only time on the scoresheet was a double as Doxa breezed past a youth selection 3-0 that October, moving on a few months later.

In 2014 he was on trial at Albanian side FK Partizani Tirana.

== Honours ==
Ross County

- Scottish Challenge Cup: 2006–07
