= Tomey =

Tomey is a surname. Notable people with the surname include:

- Dick Tomey (1938–2019), American football coach and player
- Francisco Tomey (1946–2024), Spanish journalist and politician

== See also ==
- Tome (disambiguation)
- Tomei (disambiguation)
