= Tomei =

Tomei may refer to:

People with the surname Tomei, which is an Italian version of Thomas

- Bernardo Tomei (born 1933), Italian ice hockey player
- Carolyn Tomei (born 1936), Democratic politician from the US state of Oregon
- Concetta Tomei, (born 1945), American actress
- Francesco Tomei (born 1985), Italian cyclist
- Louis Tomei (1910–1955), American racecar driver
- Marisa Tomei, (born 1964), American actress
- Matteo Tomei (born 1984), Italian footballer
- Yumi Tomei (born 1972), former Japanese football player

Other:

- Tōmei Expressway, Japanese expressway connecting Tokyo with Nagoya
- New Tōmei Expressway
- Tomei Ningen, 1954 Japanese film, based on The Invisible Man
- Stadio Claudio Tomei, football stadium
