= Don Cowie (footballer) =

Scottish footballer and coach

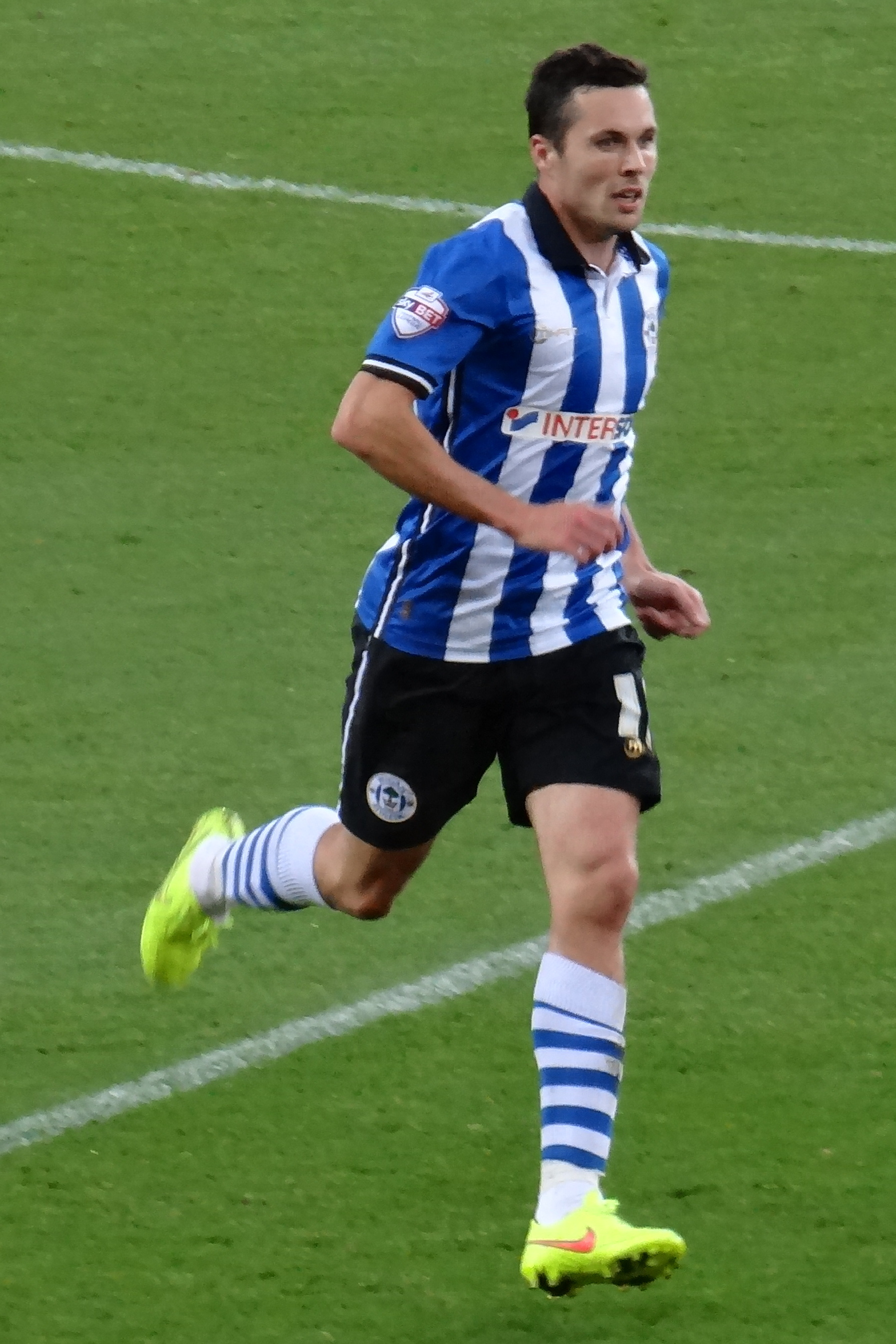
- Cowie playing for Wigan Athletic in 2014

Personal information
- Full name: Don McCulloch Cowie
- Date of birth: 15 February 1983 (age 43)
- Place of birth: Inverness, Scotland
- Height: 5 ft 11 in (1.80 m)
- Position: Midfielder

Youth career
- Ross County

Senior career*
Years	Team	Apps	(Gls)
2000–2007	Ross County	156	(17)
2007–2009	Inverness Caledonian Thistle	59	(12)
2009–2011	Watford	88	(9)
2011–2014	Cardiff City	86	(6)
2014–2016	Wigan Athletic	37	(0)
2016–2018	Heart of Midlothian	72	(3)
2018–2020	Ross County	38	(2)
Total		536	(49)

International career
2009–2012	Scotland	10	(0)

Managerial career
- 2024–2025: Ross County
- * Club domestic league appearances and goals

Don McCulloch Cowie (born 15 February 1983) is a Scottish professional football coach and former player, who was most recently the manager of Ross County. Cowie played as a midfielder for Inverness Caledonian Thistle, Watford, Cardiff City, Wigan Athletic, Heart of Midlothian and Ross County. Cowie made ten international appearances for the Scotland national football team between 2009 and 2012.

== Club career ==
=== Ross County ===
Born in Inverness, Cowie attended Dingwall Academy and came up through Ross County's youth system and went on to captain the club. His father was also a footballer for Ross County during the club's long membership of the Highland Football League. He was on the Ross County side that drew 1–1 against Clyde but beat them in a penalty shoot-out in the Challenge cup final. On 30 January 2007, he signed a pre-contract agreement with Highland derby rivals Inverness and officially joined them on 1 July 2007.

=== Inverness Caledonian Thistle ===
Cowie's first season at the club proved fruitful as he abided so quickly to the Scottish Premier League (SPL). He scored his first goal for the club in a 2–1 defeat away to St Mirren. During Caley Thistle's poor start to the season Cowie proved to be an inspirational figure in the starting eleven. One of his best moments of the season came when he scored the third, and winning goal in Caley Thistle's 3–2 win over Celtic, as well as a stunning 20-yard volley in a win over Kilmarnock. He finished the season as Inverness' top scorer with nine goals and was voted Player of the Year in Caley Thistle's match program.

=== Watford ===
He was set to join Championship club Watford over the summer of 2009, as he signed a pre-contract agreement with the club on 29 January 2009. Despite this agreement, Inverness and Watford agreed a fee and he moved on transfer deadline day for a nominal fee on 2 February. He made his debut for on 14 February, in the FA Cup fifth-round tie against Chelsea, appearing as a 67th-minute substitute for Lee Williamson. In the following game, he made his league debut in a 2–0 home victory against Swansea City on 17 February.

He scored his first goal for Watford against Crystal Palace, in a league game on 28 February 2009. On 7 December 2009, Cowie became the man who has the distinction of assisting Lloyd Doyley's first ever goal for Watford, he then himself went on to score in the same game, ending in a 3–1 victory against Queens Park Rangers.

=== Cardiff City ===
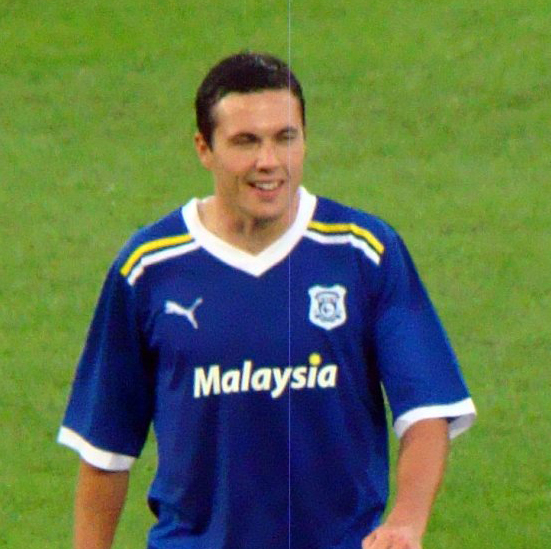
Cowie playing for Cardiff City in 2011

On 1 July 2011, Cowie signed for Cardiff City on a three-year contract, following newly appointed Cardiff manager Malky Mackay to Wales having been convinced not to sign an improved contract at Watford so Cardiff would not have to pay for the transfer. He made his debut for the club away at West Ham United in a shock 1–0 win on the opening day of the Championship season. Cowie scored his first and second goals for the Bluebirds in a 5–3 win over Huddersfield Town in the League Cup. He scored his first league goal of the season in a 1–1 draw with Blackpool at Bloomfield Road. Cowie scored two more goals in two goal fests which included a 4–3 loss at Peterborough United and a 5–3 victory against Barnsley at Cardiff City Stadium. He made his 400th career appearance in a 1–0 win over Crystal Palace in the League Cup, a tie which saw Cardiff reach their first-ever final in the competition. Cowie played the entirety of the Wembley final against Premier League Liverpool, but after a 2–2 draw following extra time, the Reds won the final 3–2 on penalties, a shootout in which Cowie took and converted Cardiff's second penalty.

Cowie opened his goal account for the 2012–13 season on 22 September against Crystal Palace. Cowie scored two goals and made twenty-five appearances in a season in which Cardiff won the Championship title, securing promotion to the Premier League. The club was relegated from the Premier League after its first season in the top flight. Cowie was offered a new contract by manager Ole Gunnar Solskjaer, but he decided to leave the club.

=== Wigan ===
Cowie signed for Wigan Athletic on a two-year contract in July 2014.

=== Hearts ===
Cowie became the first signing of Scottish Premiership side Hearts during the 2015–16 winter transfer window, signing a two-a-half-year deal with the Tynecastle club. In August 2017, his contract was extended by one year.

=== Ross County (second spell) ===
Cowie rejoined Ross County in August 2018. He retired from playing in June 2020.

== International career ==
On 7 October 2009, Cowie was called up to the Scotland squad for the first time. He made his debut in the match, a 2–0 defeat against Japan, on 10 October. Cowie started in his second game for Scotland in a friendly against Wales at the new home of Cardiff City. His first competitive start for Scotland came against Lithuania on 6 September 2011 in the UEFA Euro 2012 qualifier.

== Coaching career ==
After his retirement from playing in June 2020, Cowie moved into a coaching role with Ross County. He became assistant manager to Malky Mackay, who signed Cowie as a player at Watford and Cardiff City respectively. Cowie became interim manager in February 2024, following the resignation of Derek Adams. After the club avoided relegation by winning a play-off against Raith Rovers on 26 May 2024, Cowie was given the job on a permanent basis. County were then relegated via the play-offs in the following season, losing to Livingston. Cowie left the club by mutual consent in August 2025, following successive home defeats by St Johnstone and Partick Thistle.

== Personal life ==
Cowie is a member of a footballing family: his wife, Shelley, played football for Glasgow City and the Scotland national team, but gave up in order to start a family. His father, also named Don, played football in the Highland League with Ross County, Inverness Caledonian and Buckie Thistle.

== Career statistics ==
As of match played 13 July 2020

Appearances and goals by club, season and competition
Club	Season	League			Domestic Cup		League Cup		Other		Total	
Club	Season	Division	Apps	Goals	Apps	Goals	Apps	Goals	Apps	Goals	Apps	Goals
Ross County	2000–01	Scottish First Division	1	0	0	0	0	0	0	0	1	0
Ross County	2001–02	Scottish First Division	18	0	1	0	2	0	3 (Note: Appearances in Scottish Challenge Cup)	0	24	0
Ross County	2002–03	Scottish First Division	29	1	1	0	3	1	2	0	35	2
Ross County	2003–04	Scottish First Division	18	0	1	0	2	1	2	0	23	1
Ross County	2004–05	Scottish First Division	34	5	3	0	2	0	4	1	43	6
Ross County	2005–06	Scottish First Division	30	4	3	3	0	0	0	0	33	7
Ross County	2006–07	Scottish First Division	29	7	1	0	2	2	5	0	37	9
Ross County	Total		159	17	10	3	11	4	16	1	196	25
Inverness Caledonian Thistle	2007–08	Scottish Premier League	37	9	1	0	3	0	—		41	9
Inverness Caledonian Thistle	2008–09	Scottish Premier League	22	3	1	0	3	0	—		26	3
Inverness Caledonian Thistle	Total		59	12	2	0	6	0	—		67	12
Watford	2008–09	Championship	10	3	1	0	0	0	—		11	3
Watford	2009–10	Championship	41	2	1	0	2	0	—		44	2
Watford	2010–11	Championship	37	4	0	0	2	0	—		39	4
Watford	Total		88	9	2	0	4	0	—		94	9
Cardiff City	2011–12	Championship	43	4	0	0	7	3	2 (Note: Appearances in Championship play-offs)	0	52	7
Cardiff City	2012–13	Championship	25	2	0	0	0	0	—		25	2
Cardiff City	2013–14	Premier League	18	0	2	0	2	0	—		22	0
Cardiff City	Total		86	6	2	0	9	3	2	0	99	9
Wigan Athletic	2014–15	Championship	32	0	1	0	0	0	—		33	0
Wigan Athletic	2015–16	League One	5	0	0	0	0	0	2 (Note: Appearances in Football League Trophy)	0	7	0
Wigan Athletic	Total		37	0	1	0	0	0	2	0	40	0
Heart of Midlothian	2015–16	Scottish Premiership	10	0	2	0	0	0	—		12	0
Heart of Midlothian	2016–17	Scottish Premiership	34	3	2	0	1	0	2 (Note: Appearances in the Europa League)	0	39	3
Heart of Midlothian	2017–18	Scottish Premiership	28	0	1	1	4	1	—		33	2
Heart of Midlothian	Total		72	3	5	1	5	1	2	0	84	5
Ross County	2018–19	Scottish Championship	29	2	0	0	1	0	3	0	33	2
Ross County	2019–20	Scottish Premiership	9	0	0	0	0	0	—		9	0
Ross County	Total		38	2	0	0	1	0	3	0	42	2
Career total			539	49	22	4	36	8	25	1	621	62

=== Managerial record ===
As of match played 8 August 2025

Managerial record by team and tenure
Team	From	To	Record					Ref
Team	From	To	P	W	D	L	Win %	Ref
Ross County	8 February 2024	24 August 2025	69	21	17	31	30.4	

== Honours ==
=== Player ===
Ross County

- Scottish Championship: 2018–19
- Scottish Challenge Cup: 2006–07, 2018–19

Cardiff City

- Football League Championship: 2012–13
- Football League Cup runner-up: 2011–12

=== Manager ===
Ross County

- Scottish Premiership play-offs: 2023–24
