= Brian Gilmour =

Scottish footballer

Personal information
- Full name: Brian Thomas Gilmour
- Date of birth: 8 May 1987 (age 39)
- Place of birth: Irvine, Scotland
- Position: Midfielder

Senior career*
Years	Team	Apps	(Gls)
2003–2007	Rangers	0	(0)
2007	Clyde	13	(1)
2007–2008	Queen of the South	23	(1)
2008	FC Haka	7	(0)
2009–2010	Lincoln City	16	(2)
2011	Stenhousemuir	9	(0)
2011–2013	KA	45	(6)
2013–2018	Ayr United	115	(8)
Total		228	(18)

International career
2005–2006	Scotland U19	5	(1)
2007	Scotland U20	1	(0)

Managerial career
- 2021: Rangers (joint-caretaker)
- * Club domestic league appearances and goals as of 11:51, 25 March 2018 (UTC)

Brian Thomas Gilmour (born 8 May 1987 in Irvine, North Ayrshire) is a Scottish footballer who used to play as a midfielder now he serves as a football coach for Rangers B Team.

He has represented his country from under-13 to under-21 levels playing in the European Under-19s final and represented Scotland under-20 at Fifa World Cup in Canada.

== Playing career ==
=== Club ===
Gilmour began his career with Rangers. However, he did not make a first-team appearance for the club and on 9 February 2007 he signed for First Division side Clyde. He made his debut the following day in a 1–0 defeat to Livingston at the Broadwood Stadium. His first goal came on 17 March in a 2–2 draw with Ross County at Victoria Park. He made a total of 13 appearances, scoring one goal in 2006–07, his only season with the Bully Wee. He moved on to sign for fellow First Division side Queen of the South in July 2007, making his debut on 4 August in a 3–3 draw with St Johnstone at Palmerston Park. His first goal came on 19 April 2008 in a 1–0 home win over Dundee. He made a total of 27 appearances for Queens, before leaving in May 2008. 2007/08 was his only season with Queens with the majority of his appearances coming in the first half of the season. He was part of the squad that reached the 2008 Scottish Cup Final and qualified for the UEFA Cup for the following season.

Gilmour signed an 18-month contract with Finnish Veikkausliiga side FC Haka in the summer of 2008. Shortly after joining in August 2008 he played in Haka's 2008–09 UEFA Cup Second qualifying round defeat to Danish side Brøndby at their Brøndby Stadium. He mutually terminated his contract with FC Haka in May 2009. He played a total of seven league games for Haka. In September 2009 he had a trial with English Championship club Blackpool managed by Ian Holloway.

Gilmour signed for Football League Two side Lincoln City on 27 November 2009 until the end of the season. He struggled to get into the team at first initially but found himself getting regular games towards the end of the season, although he was played in an unfamiliar midfield position. Gilmour was offered a new deal but failed to agree personal terms with the club before then manager Chris Sutton's deadline. Gilmour's offer was withdrawn and he left the club in July 2010.

In July 2011 he joined Icelandic club KA who were playing in Iceland's second tier. After two years Gilmour left Iceland to join Ayr United on 12 November 2013, until January 2014. He made his debut the same day against Stranraer. Gilmour signed a new contract running until May 2018 with Ayr in January 2014. Gilmour was released by Ayr United on 31 January 2018.

=== International ===
Gilmour was the only Rangers player to participate in the 2006 European under-19 Championship for Scotland who reached the final. Gilmour made a subs appearance in the final losing 2–1 to Spain. He was selected in the Scotland squad for the 2007 Under-20 World Cup Finals in Canada in a group along with Japan, Nigeria and Costa Rica.

== Coaching career ==
Gilmour returned to Rangers in May 2017 as a part-time coach in the clubs Academy. On 30 June 2020, as part of Rangers restructuring of its academy set-up, Gilmour was appointed joint coach of the B Team alongside Kevin Thomson and latterly David McCallum. On 1 October 2023, after the dismissal of Rangers first team manager Michael Beale, Gilmour assisted the interim manager Steven Davis with coaching duties.

== Career statistics ==
As of 8 September 2009

Club performance			League		Cup		League Cup		Continental		Total	
Season	Club	League	Apps	Goals	Apps	Goals	Apps	Goals	Apps	Goals	Apps	Goals
Scotland			League		Scottish Cup		League Cup		Europe		Total	
2006–07	Clyde	First Division	13	1	0	0	0	0	0	0	13	1
2007–08	Queen of the South	First Division	23	1	2	0	1	0	0	0	27	1
Total	Scotland		36	2	2	0	1	0	0	0	40	2
Finland			League		Finnish Cup		League Cup		Europe		Total	
2008	Haka	Veikkausliiga	7	0	0	0	0	0	2	0	9	0
Total	Finland		7	0	0	0	0	0	2	0	9	0
England			League		FA Cup		League Cup		Europe		Total	
2009–10	Lincoln City	League 2	0	0	0	0	0	0	0	0	0	0
Total	England		0	0	0	0	0	0	0	0	0	0
Career total			43	2	2	0	1	0	2	0	50	0

Notes

- a 1 Scottish Challenge Cup in 2007 (included in 2007–08 total)
