= Goran Stanić =

Macedonian footballer (born 1972)

Personal information
- Date of birth: 8 September 1972 (age 54)
- Place of birth: Skopje, SR Macedonia, SFR Yugoslavia
- Height: 1.78 m (5 ft 10 in)
- Position: Defender

Senior career*
| Years | Team | Apps | (Gls) |
| 1997–1998 | Vardar | 25+ | (3+) |
| 1998–2000 | Lleida | 52 | (1) |
| 2000–2001 | Cementarnica | 22 | (1) |
| 2001–2002 | Rabotnički | 39 | (1) |
| 2002–2003 | Rad | 13 | (0) |
| 2003–2004 | Raith Rovers | 29 | (0) |
| 2004–2005 | Livingston | 20 | (0) |
| 2005–2008 | St Johnstone | 127 | (1) |
| 2008–2010 | East Fife | 4 | (0) |

International career
| 1999–2001 | Macedonia | 2 | (0) |

Managerial career
- 2015: Macedonia U19
- 2017–2018: Macedonia U17
- 2019–2020: Macedonia U19
- * Club domestic league appearances and goals

Goran Stanić (Macedonian: Горан Станиќ; born 8 September 1972) is a Macedonian former professional footballer who played as a defender.

== Club career ==
Stanić scored his first goal in Scottish League Football for St Johnstone with a 35-yard strike against Hamilton in October 2005. His form improved as the season progressed, resulting in a couple of supporters' awards at the end of the campaign.

In April 2007, Stanić was one of three St Johnstone players named in the SPFA's Scottish Division One "Team of the Year", voted for by the managers.

Stanic spent three seasons with St Johnstone but in April 2008, it was announced that he had joined Third Division champions East Fife on a two-year contract. During his time in Perth, Stanic made 127 appearances for St Johnstone in all competitions, scoring once. He appeared in two Scottish Cup semi-finals and one League Cup semi-final, and was part of the side that won the Challenge Cup in November 2007. He officially signed for East Fife in June 2008. He was then released at the end of the 2009–10 season.

== International career ==
Stanić won the last of his two international caps in a 5–0 friendly defeat to Hungary in November 2001, two years after winning his other cap in a 1–1 draw with the Republic of Ireland in Skopje in a Euro 2000 qualifier.

== Coaching career ==
Stanić has held several positions with North Macedonia national team since 2017, coaching the youth teams.

== Honours ==
St Johnstone

- Scottish Challenge Cup: 2007–08
