= Keith Shevlin =

Irish footballer

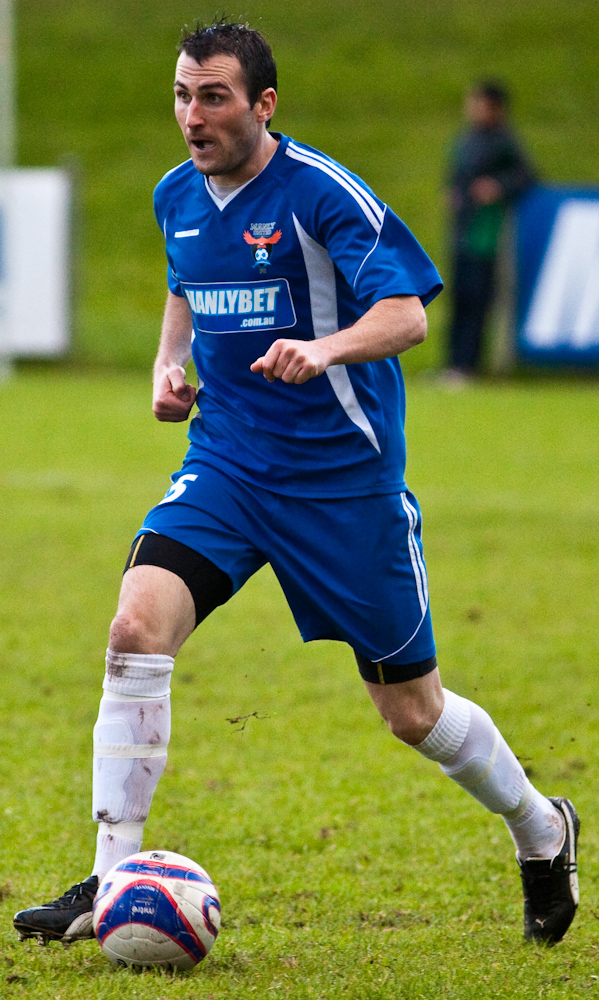

Personal information
- Full name: Keith Shevlin
- Date of birth: 15 November 1981 (age 44)
- Place of birth: Athlone, Republic of Ireland
- Height: 1.80 m (5 ft 11 in)
- Position: Forward

Youth career
- Shamrock Rovers
- Athlone Town

Senior career*
Years	Team	Apps	(Gls)
1999–2000	Shamrock Rovers	0	(0)
2000–2003	UNC Wilmington	41	(1)
2004–2005	UNC Wilmington	38	(1)
2006–2007	Clyde	20	(0)
2006–2007	Dundee	28	(8)
2007	Cork City	32	(3)
2008–2010	Manly United FC		
2011–2012	Marconi Stallions		
2013	APIA Leichhardt	18	(1)
- * Club domestic league appearances and goals

Keith Shevlin (born 11 November 1981) is an Irish professional Association Football player who plays in the position of forward.

== Career ==
Shevlin was a trainee at his hometown club Athlone Town. He made his first-team debut as a 16-year-old substitute on 17 April 1997. Shevlin then went on to sign for Shamrock Rovers in the Eircom League of Ireland Premier division before going to America on a football Scholarship. He went on to play three years at the University of North Carolina Wilmington. His performances for the Seahawks gained international recognition when he was drafted into the Irish Squad for the Universiade tournament in İzmir, Turkey.

Shevlin began his appearance on the world's stage in fine form scoring against Russia in the first match of the group. The Irish squad followed with matches against Japan, Thailand, and Iran, where Shevlin was again amongst the goal scorers. His performances on the world stage attracted interest from various clubs. The 5' 11", 175-pound Shevlin began the summer on tour with Dunfermline FC of the Scottish Premier League before joining Dundee FC of the 1st Division, where he continued his goal scoring form. He also had a spell with Clyde F.C.

Shevlin left Scotland and returned home to sign a professional contract with Cork City F.C, the defending champion of the Eircom League's Premier Division. Shevlin currently plays in Australia, with Marconi Stallions in the New South Wales Premier League.
