= Sean McKenna (footballer) =

Scottish footballer (born 1987)

- Sean McKenna, Troon F.C. (October 2015)

Personal information
- Full name: Sean Barry McKenna
- Date of birth: 28 July 1987 (age 39)
- Place of birth: Bellshill, Scotland
- Position: Forward

Team information
- Current team: Shotts Bon Accord

Youth career
- 2003–2005: Queen's Park

Senior career*
Years	Team	Apps	(Gls)
2005–2008	Clyde	18	(0)
2008–2009	Camelon Juniors		
2009–2010	Brechin City	4	(0)
2010–2011	Bellshill Athletic		
2011–2012	Girvan		
2011–2012	→ Bellshill Athletic (loan)		
2012–2013	Petershill		
2013–2014	Shotts Bon Accord		
2014–2015	Beith Juniors		
2015–2016	Troon		(5)
2016–2016	Wishaw		
2016–	Shotts Bon Accord		
- * Club domestic league appearances and goals as of 12:30, 18 April 2017

Sean Barry McKenna (born 28 July 1987) is a Scottish football striker who plays for Shotts Bon Accord in the West of Scotland Central League First Division.

== Career ==
Originally a member of the Queens Park youth set-up, McKenna signed a YTS contract with Clyde in the summer of 2005, and made his début that season, coming on as a substitute in a 5–1 win against Brechin City. This turned out to be his only senior appearance of the season, but he was a regular in the Under 19 side.

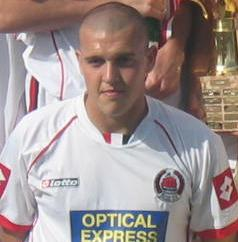

McKenna was awarded a professional contract in July 2006, and made more appearances in the 2006/07 season. His first start came against Partick Thistle in November 2006. He was released by the club in May 2008, having only made 2 starts in three years, scoring no goals. He went on to sign for Camelon Juniors. He returned to the senior game in July 2009, joining Brechin City.

McKenna joined Bellshill Athletic after open trials in the summer of 2010. He moved onto Girvan the following season but returned to Bellshill on loan before signing for Petershill in 2012. McKenna joined Shotts Bon Accord in July 2013.

On 30 September 2014 Sean sign for Beith Juniors

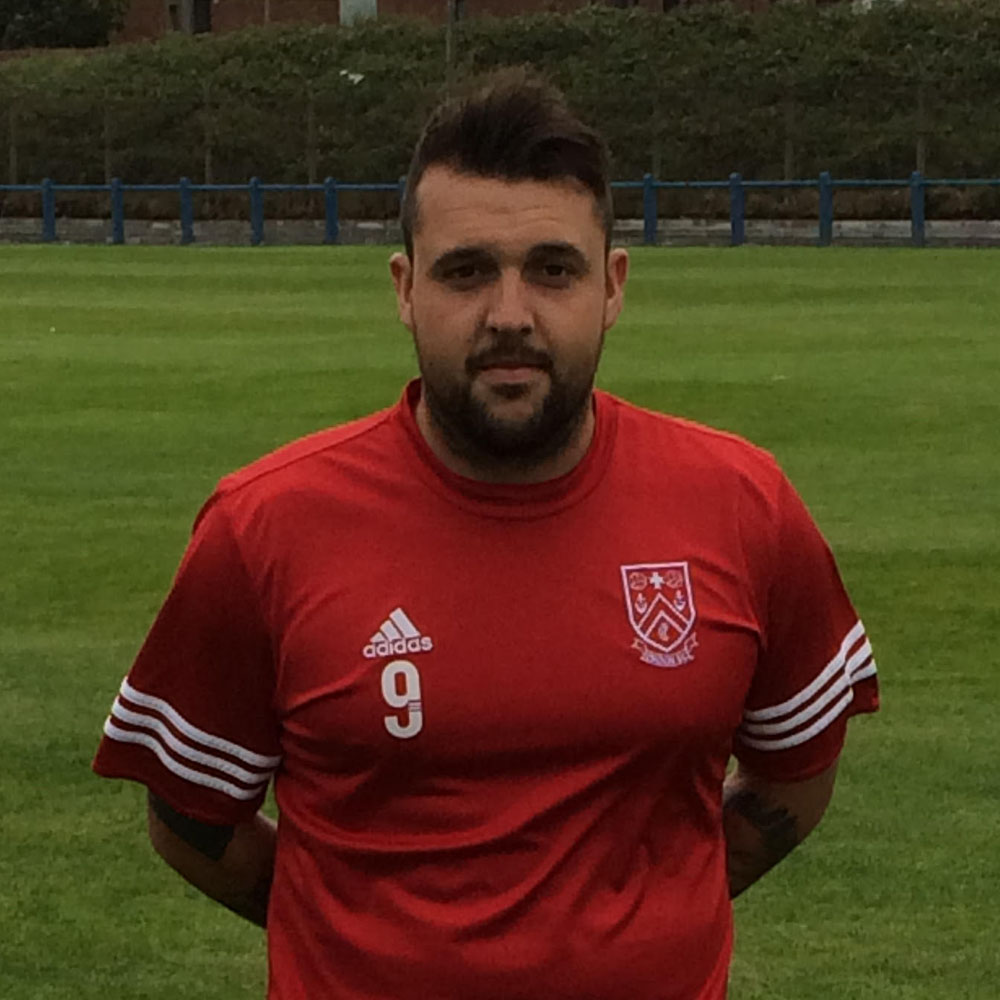
Sean McKenna, Troon F.C.

Sean signed for Troon FC in June 2015. and moved on to Wishaw in January 2016.

On 28 January 2016 Sean sign for Wishaw.

On 21 October 2016 Sean sign for Shotts Bon Accord.

== See also ==
- Clyde F.C. season 2005-06 | 2006–07 | 2007–08
