= Steven Masterton =

Scottish footballer (born 1985)

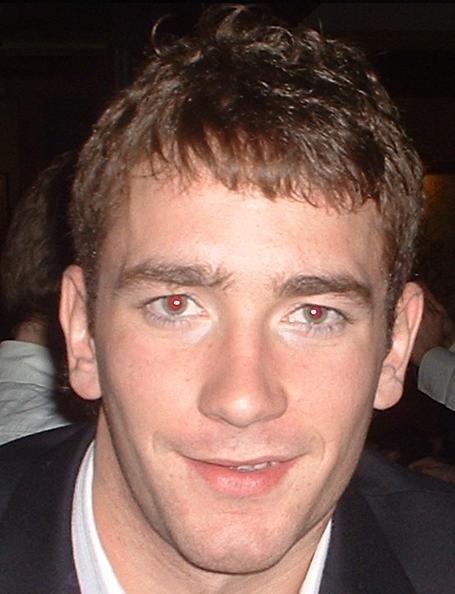

Personal information
- Full name: Steven Allan Masterton
- Date of birth: 2 January 1985 (age 41)
- Place of birth: Irvine, Scotland
- Position: Central midfielder

Youth career
- Caledonian B.C.
- 1997–2002: Rangers
- 2002–2003: Kilmarnock

Senior career*
Years	Team	Apps	(Gls)
2003–2005	Kilmarnock	0	(0)
2005–2008	Clyde	75	(13)
2008–2010	Greenock Morton	45	(6)
2010–2011	Crawley Town	13	(1)
2011–2011	→ Eastbourne Borough (loan)	5	(0)
2011	→ Hayes & Yeading United (loan)	8	(1)
2011	Montrose (trial)	1	(0)
2011	Dundee (trial)	1	(0)
2011	Auchinleck Talbot	?	(?)
2011–2012	Alloa Athletic	11	(1)
2012	Clyde	7	(0)
2013	Troon (trial)	1	(0)
2013–2015	Hurlford United	?	(?)
2015	→ Ardrossan Winton Rovers (loan)		
- * Club domestic league appearances and goals as of 00:39, 1 July 2022 (UTC)

Steven Allan Masterton (born 2 January 1985) is a Scottish football midfielder who last played for Scottish Junior Football Association, West Region side Hurlford United.

== Career ==
=== Kilmarnock ===
Masterton began his career at Kilmarnock, but didn't play for the senior team. He played in the Scottish Youth Cup winning team of 2004. Killie won 1–0 against Rangers at Rugby Park in the final. Masterton along with Neil McGregor and Steven Naismith (all three played in the final) were promoted to the first team squad shortly afterwards.

=== Clyde ===
Masterton signed for Clyde in the summer of 2005, and made his début as a substitute in a Scottish Challenge Cup tie against Brechin City. Masterton became a fringe player in his first few months at Clyde, but got a regular place in the team, filling in for long-term injury victim Paul McHale. Masterton played against Roy Keane during Clyde's famous win over Celtic in the Scottish Cup, in January 2006.

Masterton is somewhat of a dead-ball expert, and the majority of his goals come direct from free kicks. He was Clyde's second top scorer in season 2006–07, scoring 8 goals.

At the end of season 2007–08 during Clyde's Scottish First Division semi final play-off first leg match at Alloa Athletic, Masterton scored what proved to be a vital. In a 2–1 defeat, he scored the equaliser with a trademark free kick just after the hour mark . Clyde went on to win 6–5 on aggregate.

=== Greenock Morton ===
On 16 May 2008, Masterton agreed to join First Division rivals Greenock Morton.

'Masty' scored his first goal for Morton in a 3–0 Challenge Cup win over Jim McInally's East Stirlingshire before doubling his Morton tally with a 25-yard free-kick in a 4–3 cup shock victory over Scottish Premier League side Hibernian. He continued his cup goal scoring exploits with the opener against Peterhead in the Scottish Cup loss at Balmoor, before opening his league tally with the equaliser first half free-kick at Cappielow in the victory over Ross County.

He was released by Morton at the end of the 2009–10 season.

=== Crawley Town ===
In June 2010, Masterton joined Conference National side Crawley on a one-year deal.

In the January 2011 transfer window, Masterton was loaned out to Eastbourne Borough.

=== Auchinleck Talbot ===
After his release by Crawley, Masterton signed for Auchinleck Talbot on an amateur contract, to allow to sign for a senior side if one offered him terms.

=== Alloa Athletic ===
After one match in the Juniors, Masterton was offered a contract until December with Alloa Athletic in the Third Division. He made his début in the Scottish Cup draw with Annan Athletic, and he scored the final goal of the match ten minutes after replacing another ex-Morton midfielder, Darren Young.

=== Return to Clyde ===
In August 2012, Masterton made his second début for Clyde as a trialist during the club's opening league game of the season at Montrose winning 3–2. Following two more appearances for the club as a trialist he signed a short-term deal with Clyde until the end of 2012. On 10 November 2012, Masterton left the club by mutual consent after he injured himself in a Scottish cup game with Nairn County, The Clyde website said he was suffering with groin problems.

=== Hurlford United ===
Masterton signed for Junior side Hurlford United by Manager Derek McCulloch in February 2013.

Under long-term Chairman Lorimer Headley and Manager Del McCulloch, Hurlford won the SJFA West Super League First Division to win promotion to the West Super League Premier Division for the first time in their history.

In the 2013–14 season, Masterton was a key player as Hurlford not only kept their place in the Super Premier with a strong 3rd-place finish, but also won the Scottish Junior Cup for the first time, beating East Ayrshire rivals Glenafton Athletic 3–0 in the final at Rugby Park in Kilmarnock. This meant the club entered the senior Scottish Cup, a great feat for the small community of Hurlford, but almost even more remarkable, as local amateur team Hurlford Thistle also won the Scottish Amateur Cup in 2014. In the 2014–15 Scottish Cup, 'Ford overcame away ties against Highland League opponents Clachnacuddin (7–1) and Inverurie Loco Works (3–0), then took Scottish League One club Stirling Albion to a replay, extra time and a penalty shootout, which was eventually lost 13–12.

Masterton was forced to retire from the game at the age of 29 after a succession of injuries.

== See also ==
- Clyde F.C. season 2005–06 | 2006–07 | 2007–08
- Greenock Morton F.C. season 2008–09 | 2009–10
