= Roddy Hunter =

Scottish footballer (born 1984)

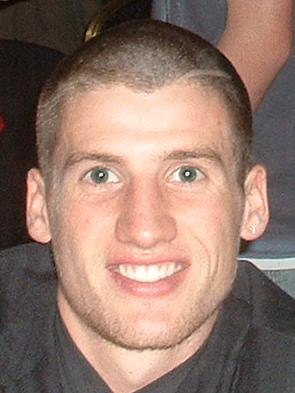

Personal information
- Date of birth: 13 December 1984 (age 41)
- Place of birth: Glasgow, Scotland
- Position: Striker

Team information
- Current team: Forth Wanderers

Youth career
- Clydebank

Senior career*
Years	Team	Apps	(Gls)
2002–2004	Ayr United	0	(0)
2005–2007	Clyde	24	(4)
2007–2008	Albion Rovers	16	(7)
2008–2009	Montrose	34	(13)
2009–2010	Dumbarton	20	(5)
2010–2012	Pollok	37	(14)
2012	→ Albion Rovers (trial)	1	(0)
2012–2013	Kirkintilloch Rob Roy		
2016–	Forth Wanderers		
- * Club domestic league appearances and goals as of 16:56, 16 October 2016 (UTC)

Roddy Hunter (born 13 December 1984) is a Scottish football striker who plays for Forth Wanderers in the Scottish Junior Football Association, West Region. He has previously played in the Scottish Football League First Division for Clyde.

== Career ==
Hunter played his youth football with Clydebank, and Ayr United, where he had an apprenticeship.

Hunter signed for Clyde in the summer of 2005, and made his début in the opening league game of the campaign, coming on as a substitute against Ross County. Hunter was a fringe player in this season, making only 3 starts. Hunter grabbed all his league goals so far whilst playing against Stranraer, where he scored 4 in a 5–0 win. Hunter was released by Graham Roberts at the end of the season.

However, like Gary Arbuckle, new manager Joe Miller came in, and offered Hunter a new deal. Hunter scored Clyde's goal in the Scottish Challenge Cup Final 2006, though Clyde were defeated on penalties.

Hunter was not given a contract extension in summer 2007, and thus, left the club, after making 29 overall appearances, scoring 5 goals, in a two-year spell.

In August 2007, Hunter appeared as a trialist for Albion Rovers, in their opening league game against Montrose. He scored the winning goal, and was signed on a permanent contract.

In October 2007, Hunter scored four goals for the second time in his career, as Albion Rovers won 8–0 in a Scottish Cup tie against Burntisland Shipyard.

He joined Montrose in January 2008. He scored an impressive 13 goals in 22 appearances for the Angus side and Dumbarton enquired about him a year later before finally signing him in July 2009. He was released at the end of the 2009–10 season.

Hunter signed for Junior side Pollok in the summer of 2010 and moved on to Kirkintilloch Rob Roy in September 2012. He also played one match as a trialist for former club Albion Rovers in January 2012. After a period out of the game, Hunter signed for Forth Wanderers in October 2016, reuniting with his former assistant manager at Montrose, Jamie McKenzie.

== See also ==
- Clyde F.C. season 2005-06 | 2006–07
