= Craig McKeown =

Scottish footballer

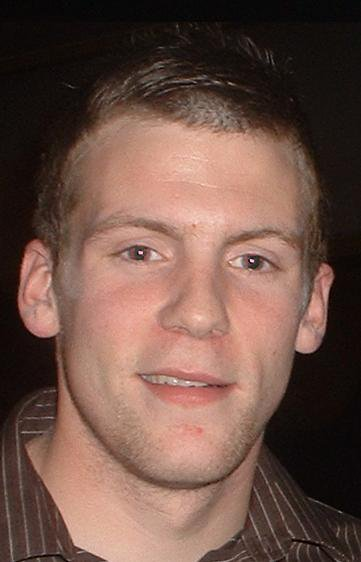

Personal information
- Date of birth: 16 March 1985 (age 41)
- Place of birth: Aberdeen, Scotland
- Height: 6 ft 1 in (1.85 m)
- Position: Centre back

Team information
- Current team: Bridge of Don Thistle

Youth career
- 2001–2003: Dunfermline Athletic

Senior career*
Years	Team	Apps	(Gls)
2003–2005	Dunfermline Athletic	1	(0)
2004–2005	→ Berwick Rangers (loan)	4	(1)
2005–2008	Clyde	81	(6)
2008–2012	Dundee	69	(1)
2009–2010	→ Stirling Albion (loan)	2	(0)
2012–2014	Formartine United		
2014–2015	Brora Rangers		
2015–2021	Formartine United		
2021–	Bridge of Don Thistle		
- * Club domestic league appearances and goals as of 27/08/2022

Craig McKeown (born 16 March 1985) is a Scottish football defender. Currently he plays for Bridge of Don Thistle.

== Career ==
Born in Aberdeen, McKeown started his senior career with Dunfermline Athletic, where he made one substitute appearance. McKeown was farmed out to Berwick Rangers on loan for one month during his time with the Pars to gain experience, before being released.

McKeown signed for Clyde during the summer of 2005. McKeown made his Clyde début against Brechin City in a Scottish Challenge Cup match. McKeown was a virtual ever present for Clyde, missing only two games, and scored his first Clyde with the very last kick of the 2005/2006 season, in the 94th minute of Clyde's final game of the campaign against Stranraer.

McKeown was awarded Clyde Player of the Year for 2006-07, in which he was part of the best defence in the league.

He was ruled out for the first few months of the 2007-08 season, after a close-season surgical wound got infected.

McKeown captained Clyde for the first time on 9 February 2008, in a match against Greenock Morton. He scored the winning goal in the 3rd minute of injury time at the end of the game, after Clyde had got a late equaliser a two minutes earlier.

McKeown signed a pre-contract agreement with Dundee in January 2008, and joined the club in June 2008.

In 2012, he left Dundee after his contract expired.

On 30 August 2012, McKeown join Highland League Club Formartine United, then on 7 Dec 2014, signed for fellow Highland League Club Brora Rangers.

== Honours ==
- Clyde Player of the Year - 2006-07
