= Craig Gunn =

Scottish footballer

Personal information
- Date of birth: 17 July 1987 (age 39)
- Place of birth: Wick, Scotland
- Height: 5 ft 10 in (1.78 m)
- Position: Striker

Team information
- Current team: Golspie Sutherland F.C

Senior career*
Years	Team	Apps	(Gls)
2003–2004	Wick Academy	26	(22)
2004–2009	Ross County	47	(2)
2008–2009	→ Peterhead (loan)	36	(4)
2009–2017	Elgin City	280	(111)
2017	Brora Rangers		
2017–	Wick Academy		
- * Club domestic league appearances and goals as of 23 December 2017 (UTC)

Craig Gunn (born 17 July 1987) is a Scottish footballer who plays as a striker for Highland League club, Wick Academy.

He was previously with Elgin City between 2009 and 2017, and has also played for Brora Rangers and Ross County, as well as a loan spell with Peterhead.

== Career ==
=== Wick Academy ===
Born in Wick, Gunn started his career at his hometown team, Highland League side Wick Academy. He spent just one season there and finished as the club's top scorer with 22 of the club's 42 league goals as the side finished 11th in the table. He also scored three cup goals. In the nine seasons from 1998–99 to 2006–07, Gunn was the only Wick player to get into double figures for league goals.

=== Ross County ===
After his impressive performance in the Highland League, Gunn moved to First Division side Ross County. He stayed there for five seasons, scoring only two goals in 47 league appearances. He made only two appearances for the first team in the 2004–05 season, but was used a lot more in his second season at the Stags. In the league he scored in a 2–1 loss to Gretna, and in a 4–1 win over Hamilton Academical on 13 March 2006. Gunn also scored two cup goals that season; one in the Scottish League Cup in the first round in a 4–2 win over Stranraer and one in the Scottish Challenge Cup in the 4–1 semi-final victory over Albion Rovers. In the 2007–08 season, Gunn made just nine substitute appearances and failed to score.

=== Peterhead ===
In 2008–09, Gunn was sent on loan to Second Division side Peterhead. He made an immediate impact with a hat trick on his début, as Peterhead beat Montrose 6–0 in the Challenge Cup. Gunn would score five more goals that season – four in the league and one in the Scottish League Cup.

=== Elgin City ===
Gunn was released by Ross County in the summer of 2009, and the striker signed a 12-month deal with Third Division Elgin City. Gunn was a regular scorer for the Moray side, contributing his fair share of goals. Despite Elgin finishing second bottom in his first season at the club, Gunn was top scorer for the whole division with 18 goals

In the 2011–12 season, Gunn was fifth top scorer in the league with 18 goals, as Elgin finished fourth. That season Gunn was awarded the Ginger Boot for August, an award for the player who scored the most goals that month across the three SFL divisions. Gunn continued his prolific scoring for Elgin, netting 128 times in 316 appearances. After eight years with the club, he left Elgin in May 2017.

== Personal life ==
In December 2012, Gunn's 34-year-old brother, Jamie, died after collapsing in his home. Elgin City players wore a black armband and the club held a minute's silence to pay their respects.

== Honours ==
Ross County

- Scottish Challenge Cup: 2006–07
