= KSK Ronse =

Former Belgian football club

Ronse
- Full name: Koninklijke Sportkring Ronse
- Founded: 1906 (as A.S. Renaisienne)
- Dissolved: 23 March 2022
- Ground: Orphale Cruckestadion (1993–2022); Maurice Vande Wiele Stadion (1988–1993); Parc Lagache (1922–1988)
- Final season; 2021–22: 16th (Relegated from Belgian Division 2)
Home colours	Away colours

Koninklijke Sportkring Ronse was a Belgian football club formed in Ronse, East Flanders in 1906 as A.S. Renaisienne.

== History ==
A.S. Renaisienne was founded in 1906 and received later the matricule n° 38. The club first reached second division in 1923 but returned to third division in 1926 as only the best 7 from each league (A and B) were qualified to play the united second division on the next season. After two seasons at the third level, A.S. Renaisienne was back to second division for just one year (as they finished last). In 1931, the other club from the town (that was then named Club Renaisien with matricule n° 46) promoted to second division joined in 1937 by A.S., both clubs remaining there until the competition was stopped due to World War II. After the war, the two clubs declined, Club (now named R.F.C. Renaisien) making a short one-season appearance in second division (1958–59). In 1987 the fusion became inevitable. The new club kept the matricule n° 38. After a few years of struggling in lower divisions they made it back to the second in 2001. After a short intermezzo in third division they returned into the second division for two more years.

In March 2022, the club announced that they had folded due to financial problems. At that point, Ronse competed in the fourth-tier Belgian Division 2. Operations were continued by K.V.V. Vlaamse Ardennen who were renamed K.S.K. Vlaamse Ardennen to include Ronse in the new setup.
