= Matteo Tomei =

Italian footballer

Personal information
- Date of birth: 28 June 1984 (age 42)
- Place of birth: Motta di Livenza, Italy
- Height: 1.88 m (6 ft 2 in)
- Position: Goalkeeper

Youth career
- –2002: Udinese
- 2002–2003: Padova

Senior career*
Years	Team	Apps	(Gls)
2003–2004	Sambonifacese	34	(0)
2004–2005	Itala San Marco	23	(1)
2005–2006	Triestina	0	(0)
2006–2007	Ross County	7	(0)
2008–2009	Isola Liri	2	(0)
2010	Manzanese		
2010–2011	Union Quinto	30	(0)
2011–2013	SandonàJesolo	69	(0)
2013–2015	Real Vicenza	66	(0)
2015–2017	Pordenone	65	(0)
2017–2018	Siracusa	33	(0)
2018–2019	Vis Pesaro	34	(0)
2019–2020	Teramo	30	(0)
2020–2021	Juve Stabia	19	(0)
2021	Ravenna	14	(0)
2021–2022	Brian Lignano		
2022	Catania	0	(0)
Total		426	(1)

Managerial career
- 2022–2023: Catania (GK coach)
- 2024: Sampdoria (GK coach)
- * Club domestic league appearances and goals

Matteo Tomei (born 28 June 1984) is an Italian former professional footballer who played as a goalkeeper.

== Biography ==
=== Serie D ===
Born in Motta di Livenza, Veneto region, Tomei was a youth product of Venetian club Padova. From 2003 to 2005 Tomei was a goalkeeper for two Serie D clubs.

=== Triestina ===
On 10 July 2005 he was signed by Julian Venetian club Triestina in a 5-year contract. Tomei appeared as an unused bench for Triestina in 2005–06 Serie B. On 31 January 2007 Tomei was signed by Ross County of the First Division of Scottish Football League.

In 2008, he was signed by Italian Lega Pro Seconda Divisione club Isola Liri.

=== Return to Serie D ===
In summer 2010 he was signed by Union Quinto. In summer 2011 he left for SandonàJesolo.

=== Serie C ===
In summer 2013 he was signed by Real Vicenza. Tomei participated in the training camp held by Associazione Italiana Calciatori for those without a club.

Real Vicenza avoided from relegation back to Serie D in 2014, but was expelled from 2015–16 Lega Pro due to financial stress test.

On 26 July 2015 Tomei was signed by Pordenone.

On 22 September 2020, he joined Juve Stabia on a two-year contract.

On 1 February 2021 he signed a 2.5-year contract with Ravenna.

On 28 October 2021 he joined amateur side Brian Lignano.
