= Stuart Anderson (Scottish footballer) =

Scottish footballer (born 1986)

Personal information
- Full name: Stuart Anderson
- Date of birth: 22 April 1986 (age 40)
- Place of birth: Aberdeen, Scotland
- Position: Midfielder

Team information
- Current team: Formartine United

Youth career
- 2002–2003: Southampton

Senior career*
Years	Team	Apps	(Gls)
2003–2004	Southampton	0	(0)
2004–2006	Blackpool	11	(0)
2006	→ Ross County (loan)	31	(1)
2007	Livingston	6	(0)
2007–2009	Peterhead	65	(14)
2009–2010	Salisbury City	34	(2)
2010–2011	Peterhead	14	(2)
2011–2012	Salisbury City	58	(8)
2012	→ Eastbourne Borough (loan)	15	(0)
2012–2013	Raith Rovers	43	(0)
2013–2014	Brechin City	9	(0)
2014–	Formartine United	165	(27)

Managerial career
- 2022-: Formartine United
- * Club domestic league appearances and goals as of 01:10, 28 January 2014 (UTC)

Stuart Anderson (born 22 April 1986) is a Scottish footballer who is player-manager of Formartine United in the Highland Football League.

== Playing career ==
=== Southampton ===
Anderson started out his career a long way from his home town as he was signed by Southampton as a trainee. He played for their youth team and in 2003 was given a professional contract by the club. However, at the end of the season, he was no longer needed by the club and was allowed to leave without playing a first-team game.

=== Blackpool ===
His next move was to Blackpool in time for the 2004–05 season. As one of the younger players in the squad he rarely featured in the first team during his first season at the club and was mainly used as a back-up player. He played the majority of his game in the reserve side, but featured a few times in the 2004–05 season. The following season he found chances limited and eventually returned to Scotland when he went on loan to Ross County in February 2006 and remained there for the rest of the season. On his return to Blackpool, he got even less chance in the first team and was released at the end of the season.

=== Livingston ===
After a period out of the professional game, he was given a contract by Livingston in March 2007. This was only a short-term contract though to prove himself to the club. However, he failed to earn himself a contract for the following season in his month spell at Livingston.

=== Peterhead ===
After not being given a long-term contract by Livingston, Anderson was snapped up by Peterhead for the 2007–08 season. He quickly became a first team regular within the squad and established himself in the centre of midfield. He played regularly in the two seasons he remained at Peterhead, scoring 10 goals for the side. At the end of the 2008–09 season, he was offered a new contract by Peterhead. However, he decided to join Salisbury City on trial instead, turning down the contract offered to him.

=== Salisbury City ===
After impressing during pre-season, Anderson signed a one-year contract with Salisbury City in August 2009. He started the season in the centre of midfield and quickly established himself within the side, missing very few games for the first team, leading to him signing a contract extension until the end of the 2010–11 season in February 2010.

=== Return to Peterhead ===
He left Salisbury at the end of the 2009–10 season, citing personal reasons, and re-signed with Peterhead. However, in January 2011 he returned to Salisbury. "Stuart came to me a couple of weeks ago to say he'd been offered a job in Southampton and asked if he could leave the club," said Peterhead manager Neale Cooper. "I said at the time that we didn't have the numbers to allow that, but with a number of players returning we are now in position to allow him to leave."

=== Salisbury City ===
He returned to Salisbury City to play a part in their promotion to the Conference South, featuring in their play-off final win over Hednesford Town. He was rewarded with a new 1-year deal at the club. His second spell with the club saw Anderson establish himself as a key player for Salisbury. He also cashed in on regular appearances with a good goalscoring return, the highlight of this, converting a penalty in extra time away to Grimsby Town to win it for Salisbury and send them through to the third round of the FA Cup for the first time in their history.

=== Eastbourne Borough ===
On 23 February 2012 it was announced he had signed for Eastbourne Borough on a one-month loan deal, reuniting him with former Salisbury boss Tommy Widdrington.

=== Raith Rovers ===
On 12 July 2012 Anderson signed a contract with Raith Rovers becoming Grant Murray's first signing as manager.

In May 2013 he was released.

=== Brechin City ===
In June 2013 Anderson signed for Brechin City.

=== Formartine United ===
In January 2014, after being released by Brechin City, Anderson signed for Highland Football League club Formartine United.

== Managerial career ==
In March 2022, Anderson was appointed player-manager of Formartine United.

== Honours ==
Ross County

- Scottish Challenge Cup: 2006–07
