= Gary Arbuckle =

Scottish footballer (born 1984)

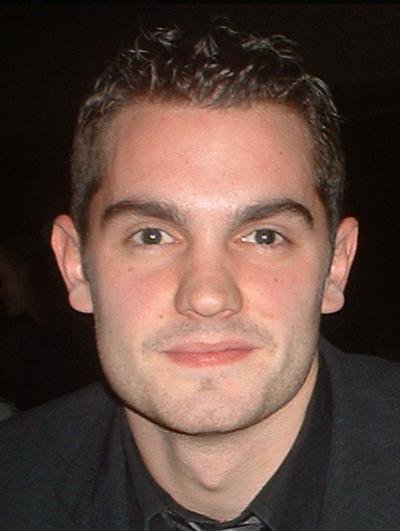

Personal information
- Date of birth: 16 August 1984 (age 42)
- Place of birth: Glasgow, Scotland
- Height: 5 ft 11 in (1.80 m)
- Position: Forward

Team information
- Current team: Gartcairn Juniors

Youth career
- 2000–2004: Celtic

Senior career*
Years	Team	Apps	(Gls)
2004–2008	Clyde	105	(16)
2008–2009	Queen of the South	8	(2)
2010	Ayr United	1	(0)
- * Club domestic league appearances and goals as of 21:45, 11 May 2009 (UTC)

Gary Arbuckle (born 16 August 1984, in Glasgow) is a Scottish footballer.

== Career ==
Arbuckle began his career with Celtic, but failed to play a first team game for them. He did win the Scottish Youth Cup in 2003. He started the final, as Celtic beat Aberdeen 3–1 at McDiarmid Park. Arbuckle signed for Clyde in the summer of 2004, when he was 19. He made his debut in a 2–1 victory against rivals Partick Thistle, in the opening game of the 2004–05 season. Arbuckle hit a famous wonderstrike in a Scottish Cup 4th Round replay against Ross County, which sent Clyde through to the Quarter Finals, to meet his former club, Celtic.

2005–06 was a very frustrating season for Arbuckle. Under new manager Graham Roberts, he only made two league starts and was not offered a new contract at the end of the season. He was eventually offered a deal by new manager Joe Miller just before the start of the 2006–07 season and played a much bigger role in that campaign. Arbuckle finished the 2006–07 season as Clyde's top goalscorer, with 11 league goals.

In July 2007, Arbuckle was listed as a trialist in pre-season games for the fourth year in a row. He was given a one-year contract extension. He made his 100th Clyde appearance against St Johnstone in August 2007 but was released in May 2008, having made 128 appearances in all competitions, scoring 20 goals.

Arbuckle then joined Queen of the South in July 2008 after impressing in a trial.

Arbuckle broke his leg in two places on 3 January 2009 against Greenock Morton. He was released by Queens at the end of the season. After a spell with Kilbirnie Ladeside, Arbuckle remained in junior football with Arthurlie.

== See also ==
- Clyde F.C. season 2004-05 | 2005–06 | 2006–07 | 2007–08
