= Derek Adams =

Scottish football manager (born 1975)

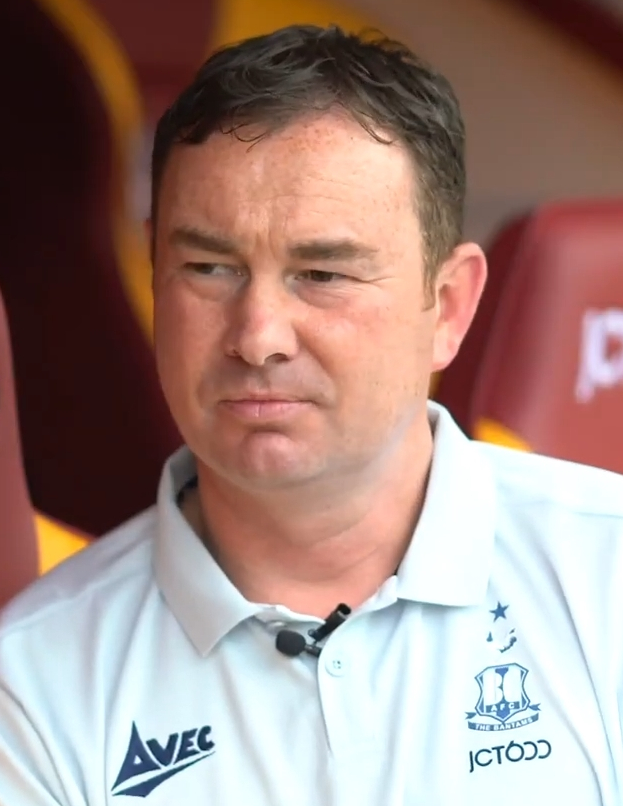
- Adams as manager of Bradford City in 2021

Personal information
- Full name: Derek Watt Adams
- Date of birth: 25 June 1975 (age 51)
- Place of birth: Glasgow, Scotland
- Height: 5 ft 10 in (1.78 m)
- Position: Midfielder

Youth career
- 1991–1992: Aberdeen

Senior career*
Years	Team	Apps	(Gls)
1992–1995	Aberdeen	0	(0)
1995–1996	Burnley	2	(0)
1996–1998	Ross County	72	(41)
1998–2004	Motherwell	159	(18)
1999–2000	→ Ayr United (loan)	4	(0)
2004–2005	Aberdeen	20	(4)
2005–2006	Livingston	25	(0)
2006–2009	Ross County	36	(4)
Total		318	(67)

Managerial career
- 2007–2010: Ross County
- 2011–2014: Ross County
- 2015–2019: Plymouth Argyle
- 2019–2021: Morecambe
- 2021–2022: Bradford City
- 2022–2023: Morecambe
- 2023–2024: Ross County
- 2024–2025: Morecambe
- * Club domestic league appearances and goals

Derek Watt Adams (born 25 June 1975) is a Scottish football manager and former player. He is currently Director of Football at EFL League One club Plymouth Argyle.

Adams became manager of Ross County in 2007, winning promotion from the Scottish Second Division in his first season, before reaching the Scottish Cup Final two years later. He joined Hibernian as assistant manager in 2010 before returning to Ross County the following year, where he won the Scottish First Division and was voted PFA Scotland Manager of the Year for the 2011–12 season. Adams then took on the managerial role at Plymouth Argyle in 2015 and led them to promotion from League 2 in 2017. Having been sacked by Plymouth in April 2019, he became manager of Morecambe in November. He would guide the club to promotion to League One in 2021, before leaving to take over at Bradford; after being sacked by Bradford, he returned to Morecambe. He left Morecambe in November 2023 to return to Ross County, but he resigned from that position in February 2024, and later started a third spell at Morecambe.

== Early life ==
Derek Watt Adams was born on 25 June 1975 in Glasgow.

== Playing career ==
Adams started his professional career with Aberdeen, but failed to make a first-team appearance. He moved to English side Burnley, making a couple of league appearances in the mid-1990s before returning to Scotland with Ross County in 1996.

Adams was transferred to Motherwell in a deal worth £200,000 in 1998 and spent six years at Fir Park, including a short loan spell with Ayr United. Adams was one of a number of players affected by the club's administration problems, accepting a pay cut in April 2002. Adams failed to win any trophies during his time with Well, although he scored in the 2002–03 Scottish Cup semi-final defeat against Rangers. In 2004, Adams agreed a pre-contract move back to Aberdeen, spending a year at Pittodrie before being transfer-listed and leaving for Livingston in 2005.

== Coaching career ==
=== Ross County (first spell) ===
In 2006, Adams returned to Ross County as player–coach. In November 2007, Adams was promoted to the role of player–manager, having served as caretaker manager since October. Despite the terms of Adams' appointment, his last playing appearance was in October 2007. He led Ross County to the Scottish Second Division championship in 2008, earning promotion to the First Division. At the age of 33, Adams became the holder of the UEFA Pro Licence, which is the highest coaching badge in the senior game. The next year, Adams led Ross County to the 2010 Scottish Cup Final, notching upset victories over SPL sides Hibernian and Celtic. County lost 3–0 to Dundee United in the Final.

=== Hibernian assistant ===
Adams left Ross County on 11 November 2010 to join Hibernian as assistant manager to Colin Calderwood. Adams has had several disciplinary cases considered by the Scottish Football Association during his coaching career. At one point he was due to be banned for a number of matches, but he won an appeal against part of the suspension. Adams was then suspended for further matches, a sanction which Hibs appealed against. While this appeal was ongoing, Adams described the whole disciplinary process as distressing.

=== Ross County (second spell) ===
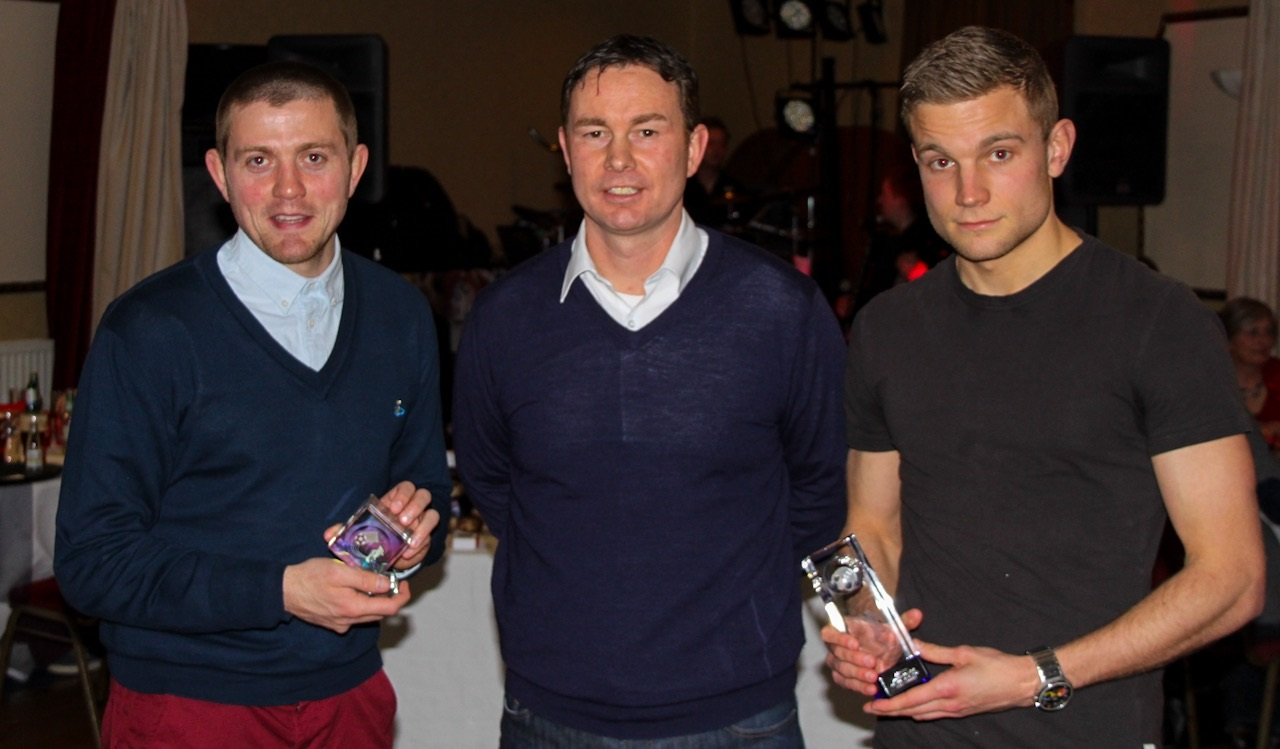
Derek Adams (middle) posed with Richard Brittain and the Young Player of the Year award winner Alex Cooper.

Adams left Hibernian on 19 May 2011 to return to Ross County as manager. In his first season back at County, Adams guided the club to the 2011–12 Scottish First Division championship and promotion to the Scottish Premier League. County clinched the championship with five games to spare. They went on a remarkable 34-game unbeaten run and finished 24 points above 2nd-placed Dundee. Adams was elected PFA Scotland Manager of the Year for the 2011–12 season.

Before the 2012–13 season, Adams made seven signings, all of which were free agents. After three draw and one win, Adams was named SPL manager of the month for August. The club's 40-match unbeaten league was ended by a 2–1 defeat to St Johnstone; Adams said he was very proud of achieving such a long run without defeat. In November 2012, Adams appointed Neale Cooper, who had just left Hartlepool United, as his assistant manager. Ross County struggled during the autumn of 2012, but Adams expected the club to avoid relegation. In late-December the club began a winning streak, that eventually led to a top-six finish in 5th position and 1 point off a European position in their first season in the top flight. In the January 2013 transfer window, Adams offloaded nine players and made six new signings. The winning streak continued, which resulted Adams receiving manager of the month awards for January and February. During the season, Adams was linked with positions at Dundee United and Aberdeen. Adams was nominated for PFA Scotland Manager of the Year, but lost out to Allan Johnston. At the end of the 2012–13 season, Adams signed a new contract with the club.

Ross County finished 7th under Adams at the end of the 2013–14 Scottish Premiership season, the second season in a row finishing above Hibernian, Hearts, Kilmarnock, Partick Thistle and St Mirren. Following a 2-1 Scottish League Cup win over Stranraer, Adams left Ross County on 28 August 2014.

=== Plymouth Argyle ===
Adams was appointed Plymouth Argyle manager on 11 June 2015. In his first season in English football as a Manager he guided Plymouth Argyle FC to the League 2 Play Off Final at Wembley for the first time in 20 years, which they lost to AFC Wimbledon. In the following season, Adams guided them to a 2nd-place finish and promotion to League One.

In the 2017–18 season, Plymouth just missed out on a promotion play-off place as they finished in 7th position in League One. Following a poor second season in League One, which left Argyle fighting relegation, Adams was relieved of his duties on 28 April 2019.

=== Morecambe (first spell) ===
On 7 November 2019, Adams became manager of Morecambe, replacing the long-serving Jim Bentley, who left to take over at AFC Fylde earlier in the month. Having been denied promotion on the final day of the 2020–21 season by a single point, Morecambe had to settle for the play-offs. They faced Tranmere Rovers in the semi-finals, winning 3–2 on aggregate, a 2–1 win away from home and drawing 1–1 at home. On 31 May 2021, Adams led Morecambe to promotion to the third tier for the first time in their club's history, a penalty from Carlos Mendes Gomes in extra-time securing a 1–0 victory over Newport County. Three days after Morecambe's play-off victory, on 3 June 2021, Adams left the club to pursue other opportunities.

=== Bradford City ===
On 4 June 2021, Adams was confirmed manager of Bradford City, signing a three-year deal.

On 15 February 2022, Adams was sacked by the club with his last match in charge being a 1–0 home defeat to Exeter City that left his side in 12th position, eight points off the play-offs. Following this defeat, Adams said in his post-match interview, "If [Bradford] are going to get a new manager in they're not going to get as successful a manager as myself in the door. That's obvious to everyone, because my record is up there with all the records in this league." They subsequently replaced him with Mark Hughes.

=== Morecambe (second spell) ===
On 24 February 2022, Adams returned to Morecambe after Stephen Robinson, the manager who had replaced Adams in the summer, returned to Scotland to manage St Mirren.

On 20 November 2023, with Morecambe sitting ninth in League Two, Adams' release clause was met and he subsequently left the club to pursue an opportunity elsewhere.

=== Ross County (third spell) ===
Adams left Morecambe to become Ross County manager for a third time in November 2023. His first game in charge was a 0–0 draw.

Adams received backlash in December following his post-match comments after losing at home to Dundee through a last-minute goal, in which he slammed the standard of Scottish football as being "shocking", calling the game "one of the worst games I've ever seen", and claiming his former team Morecambe were "miles better" than his Ross County squad, specifying that "I've left a side down in England's League Two that is miles better than this team. And that's saying something, we had the bottom budget in League Two and we were a hundred times better than this." Adams would later stand by his comments regarding the standard of Scottish football, but admitted regret in his comparison to his former employer and apologised to his playing squad for the comment.

Adams resigned from his position at Ross County on 7 February 2024, the day after a 5–0 defeat at Motherwell.

=== Morecambe (third spell) ===
On 3 June 2024, Adams was appointed Morecambe manager for a third time on a rolling contract. Morecambe were subsequently relegated from EFL League Two to the National League at the end of the 24/25 season.

On 18 August 2025, following the club's takeover by Panjab Warriors, Adams was sacked.

== Director of Football role ==
On 11 November 2025, Adams returned to Plymouth Argyle, being appointed the club's Director of Football on. The role would involve supporting manager Tom Cleverly "manage the men's first-team structure" and "provide strategic guidance" rather than being involved in "day-to-day coaching responsibilities".

== Managerial statistics ==
As of match played 3 May 2025

Managerial record by team and tenure
Team	From	To	Record				
Team	From	To	P	W	D	L	Win %
Ross County	4 October 2007	11 November 2010	154	70	41	43	45.5
Ross County	15 May 2011	28 August 2014	131	51	37	43	38.9
Plymouth Argyle	11 June 2015	28 April 2019	213	90	45	78	42.3
Morecambe	7 November 2019	3 June 2021	79	34	18	27	43.0
Bradford City	4 June 2021	15 February 2022	37	9	15	13	24.3
Morecambe	24 February 2022	20 November 2023	88	24	25	39	27.3
Ross County	20 November 2023	7 February 2024	12	2	3	7	16.7
Morecambe	3 June 2024	18 August 2025	54	14	6	34	25.9
Total			768	294	190	284	38.3

== Honours ==
=== Player ===
Ross County

- Scottish Challenge Cup: 2006–07

=== Manager ===
Ross County

- Scottish First Division: 2011–12
- Scottish Second Division: 2007–08
- Scottish Cup runner-up: 2009–10

Plymouth Argyle

- EFL League Two second-place promotion: 2016–17

Morecambe

- EFL League Two play-offs: 2021

Individual

- PFA Scotland Manager of the Year: 2011–12
- Football / EFL League Two Manager of the Month: October 2015, September 2016, December 2020, November 2024
- EFL League One Manager of the Month: February 2018
