= Ryan McCann =

Scottish footballer

Personal information
- Full name: Ryan Patrick McCann
- Date of birth: 21 September 1981 (age 45)
- Place of birth: Blantyre, Scotland
- Position: Defender

Senior career*
Years	Team	Apps	(Gls)
1998–2003	Celtic	1	(0)
2002	→ St Johnstone (loan)	19	(4)
2003–2004	Hartlepool United	4	(0)
2004–2006	St Johnstone	48	(4)
2006–2007	Clyde	24	(0)
2007	Bohemians	15	(2)
2007–2008	Queen of the South	14	(0)
2008–2009	Morecambe	15	(0)
2009	Queen of the South	12	(0)
2009–2010	Airdrie United	30	(0)
2010–2011	Ayr United	29	(4)
2011–2012	Stockport County	17	(0)
2012	Einherji	14	(6)
2012–2015	Peterhead	50	(3)
2015	→ Pollok (loan)		
2016–2019	Edusport Academy		
Total		293	(23)
- * Club domestic league appearances and goals

Ryan Patrick McCann (born 21 September 1981) is a Scottish professional footballer. He last played with Edusport Academy in the Scottish Lowland Football League.

== Playing career ==
=== Celtic, St Johnstone and Hartlepool ===
McCann began his career with Celtic and made his full debut against Dundee Utd in the SPL. He then had a six-month loan spell at St Johnstone, before heading to Hartlepool for over a year, where he only made five appearances before breaking his ankle. McCann then headed back to St Johnstone in September 2004, where he amassed a total of 41 league appearances before missing the remaining five-months of the 2005–06 season due to injury.

=== Clyde and Bohemians ===
McCann was listed as a trialist in Clyde's third Scottish First Division match of the 2006–07 season, against Dundee, and was signed on a permanent contract a week later. In July 2007, McCann turned down a new contract at Clyde in favour of signing with Irish side Bohemians and scored his first goal for Bohs in a 1–1 draw with Drogheda United in August 2007. In November 2007, McCann finished his short spell at Bohemians a finalist in the FAI League cup and qualification for Europe.

=== Queen of the South and Morecambe ===
McCann signed for Dumfries club Queen of the South in December 2007. In March 2008, McCann scored from 84 yards for Queens in a 2–0 victory against Dundee. This secured Queens' first Scottish Cup quarter-final victory since 1950. McCann also played in the 4–3 semi final victory over Aberdeen and in the 3–2 Cup Final defeat to Rangers. In a four-month spell McCann played 20 games for Queens, scoring once and qualifying for the UEFA cup.

On 20 June 2008, the Queens website announced that McCann would be leaving the club. He signed for Football League Two side Morecambe in June 2008. McCann moved back to Dumfries in January 2009.

=== Airdrie United, Ayr United, Stockport County ===
McCann signed for Airdrie United in September 2009 on a one-year deal. He made his debut for Airdrie United against Ayr at Somerset Park.

McCann spent 2010–11 at Ayr United where he was part of a successful promotion campaign from the Scottish Second Division.

On 29 July 2011, he passed a medical and completed a move to Stockport County in English football. In January 2012, McCann was involved in a road accident and due to injury was unable to finish the season. He left Stockport county in February to recover.

=== UMF Einherji, Peterhead and Pollok ===
McCann joined Icelandic team UMF Einherji as player coach. He became head coach halfway through the season. When the Icelandic league ended, McCann joined Scottish third Division club Peterhead for the remainder of the 2012–13 season. In March 2015, he moved on loan to Junior side Pollok. At the end of the 2014–15 season, with the Blue Toon, McCann retired from playing.

McCann subsequently joined Edusport Academy as a player-coach with their Lowland League team.

== See also ==
- 2006–07 Clyde F.C. season
