= Michael McGowan (footballer) =

Scottish footballer (born 1985)

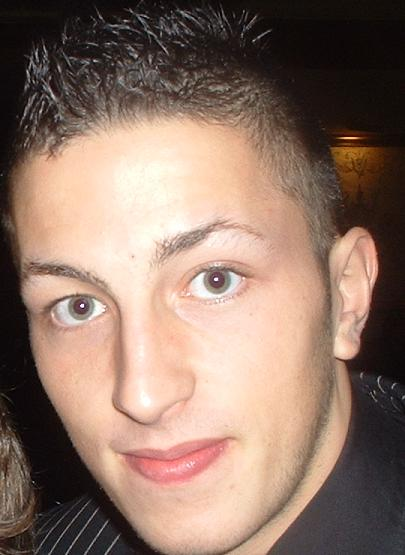

Personal information
- Full name: Michael Valentine McGowan
- Date of birth: 22 February 1985 (age 41)
- Place of birth: Glasgow, Scotland
- Position: Right midfielder

Youth career
- Queen's Park

Senior career*
Years	Team	Apps	(Gls)
2002–2004	Stenhousemuir	12	(0)
2004–2005	Dundee	0	(0)
2005–2008	Clyde	100	(5)
2008–2009	Queen of the South	13	(1)
2009–2010	Dundalk	24	(6)
2010–2011	Alloa Athletic	22	(7)
2011–2014	Ayr United	60	(6)

International career
2005–2006	Northern Ireland U21	3	(0)
- * Club domestic league appearances and goals as of 11 June 2014

Michael Valentine McGowan (born 22 February 1985) is a footballer who is currently without a club.

== Career ==
McGowan began his senior career with Stenhousemuir, where he played a handful of games, before moving to Dundee. McGowan failed to make a single appearance for Dundee, and subsequently joined Clyde.

McGowan made his Clyde debut as a substitute in the first league game of the 2005-06 season against Ross County, and went on to cement his place in the team, missing only one more game that season. During that season, McGowan was rewarded for his consistent performances by being named Clyde F.C. player of the year and earned a call up to the Northern Ireland U21 squad, after discovering he was eligible to play for them. He won three caps in total for them.

McGowan temporarily took over the captain's armband at Clyde under Joe Miller in February 2007, due to an injury to recently appointed captain Neil McGregor. McGowan captained the side for the rest of the season, and was officially appointed team captain in August 2007 under new manager Colin Hendry. He left the club in July 2008, after failing to agree a new contract.

He then joined Queen of the South in July 2008 after impressing in a trial.

McGowan signed for Dundalk in the League of Ireland in July 2009. In his first season with the club, he played 18 games and scored 6 goals, despite only joining halfway through the season. He became a fans' favourite and was named Dundalk F.C. player of the year. On the last day of the season, and on McGowan's last game for the Lilywhites, on 5 November, he scored a goal from the halfway line against Derry City. This earned him the Goal of the Season award on Monday Night Soccer.

Despite being offered an improved contract at the end of the 2009 League of Ireland season (the only player to do so), he chose to reject the offer in order to focus on signing with a Scottish club. He trained with Rangers for four months before re-signing for Dundalk on 6 May 2010, helping them get to the second round of the 2010-11 Europa League. In August 2010 he left Dundalk again when his contract was terminated by mutual consent.

In September 2010, McGowan went on trial with St Mirren. The trial came to nothing but he was picked up by Alloa Athletic in November of that year.

He signed for Ayr United in 2011.
