= Neil McGregor =

Scottish footballer

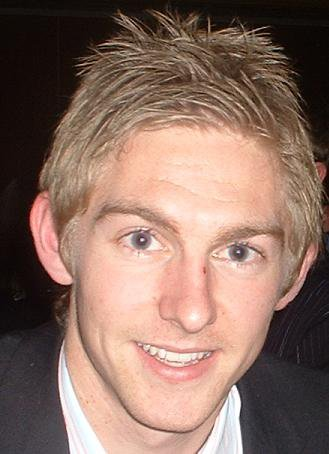

Personal information
- Date of birth: 17 July 1985 (age 41)
- Place of birth: Irvine, Scotland
- Position: Centre back

Youth career
- Crosshill United
- 2001–2002: Kilmarnock

Senior career*
Years	Team	Apps	(Gls)
2002–2005	Kilmarnock	0	(0)
2005–2009	Clyde	84	(6)
2009–2011	Dunfermline Athletic	29	(0)
2011–2013	Dundee	32	(1)
2013	→ Ayr United (loan)	14	(1)
2013–2015	Hurlford United	?	(?)
2019	Troon	9	(1)
2020–2023	Hurlford United	?	(?)
2023–2024	Kilwinning Rangers	5	(1)
- * Club domestic league appearances and goals

Neil McGregor (born 17 July 1985) is a Scottish former football defender who has previously played in the Scottish Premier League for Dundee.

He last played for Kilwinning Rangers in the 2023–24 season.

== Career ==
McGregor began his career with Kilmarnock. He played in the Scottish Youth Cup winning team of 2004. Killie won 1–0 against Rangers at Rugby Park in the final. McGregor along with Steven Masterton and Steven Naismith (all three played in the final) were promoted to the first team squad shortly afterwards. He failed to make the grade with Killie and was later released. He subsequently signed for Clyde in the summer of 2005, and scored on his début for them in the Scottish Challenge Cup against Brechin City. McGregor flourished after joining Clyde, and was awarded the Man of the Match award during Clyde's 5–2 extra time defeat to Rangers in the Scottish League Cup.

McGregor was appointed captain in January 2007, following the departure of incumbent captain Paul McHale. However, he was then sidelined by injury for the rest of the season, allowing Michael McGowan to take over the captaincy. At the start of the following season McGowan was officially appointed as team captain with McGregor being given the role of club captain, which he held until July 2008.

McGregor was selected in the SPFA First Division Team of 2006–07. In August 2007, Carlisle United were reported to have tabled an offer of £100,000 for the player. However, this offer fell through when Carlisle sacked their manager.

McGregor was released by Clyde in June 2009 along with the rest of the out of contract players, due to the club's financial position. He went on to sign for Dunfermline Athletic on a two-year contract on 30 July 2009.

On 21 July 2011 it was announced after impressing while on trial that McGregor had signed a one-year deal for Dundee FC. On 31 January 2013 McGregor left Dundee and signed for Scottish 2nd Division side Ayr United, on a loan deal until the end of the season.

His younger brother Callum is also a footballer, and was previously on the books of Clyde.

On 31 July 2013, McGregor joined Junior side Hurlford United.

== Career statistics ==
Appearances and goals by club, season and competition
Club	Season	League			Scottish Cup		League Cup		Other		Total	
Club	Season	Division	Apps	Goals	Apps	Goals	Apps	Goals	Apps	Goals	Apps	Goals
Kilmarnock	2003–04	Scottish Premier League	0	0	0	0	0	0	0	0	0	0
Kilmarnock	2004–05	Scottish Premier League	0	0	0	0	0	0	0	0	0	0
Kilmarnock	Total		0	0	0	0	0	0	0	0	0	0
Clyde	2005–06	Scottish First Division	22	1	2	0	3	1	1	1	28	3
Clyde	2006–07	Scottish First Division	22	2	1	0	1	0	4	0	28	2
Clyde	2007–08	Scottish First Division	33	3	2	0	1	0	4	0	40	3
Clyde	2008–09	Scottish First Division	7	0	0	0	0	0	2	0	9	0
Clyde	Total		84	6	5	0	5	1	11	1	105	8
Dunfermline Athletic	2009–10	Scottish First Division	24	1	3	0	2	0	0	0	29	1
Dunfermline Athletic	2010–11	Scottish First Division	5	0	3	0	0	0	0	0	8	0
Dunfermline Athletic	Total		29	1	6	0	2	0	0	0	37	1
Dundee	2011–12	Scottish First Division	27	1	2	0	0	0	0	0	29	1
Dundee	2012–13	Scottish Premier League	5	0	0	0	2	0	0	0	7	0
Dundee	Total		32	1	2	0	2	0	0	0	36	1
Ayr United (loan)	2012–13	Scottish Second Division	14	1	0	0	0	0	0	0	14	1
Career total			159	9	13	0	9	1	11	1	192	11

== Honours ==
=== Kilmarnock ===
- Scottish Youth Cup winners: 2003–04

=== Hurlford United ===
- Scottish Junior Cup winners: 2013–14
- West of Scotland League Cup winners: 2021–22

== See also ==
- 2005–06 Clyde F.C. season, 2006–07 Clyde F.C. season, 2007–08 Clyde F.C. season, 2008–09 Clyde F.C. season
- 2009–10 Dunfermline Athletic F.C. season
