= Andy Ferguson =

Scottish footballer (born 1985)

Personal information
- Full name: Andrew David Ferguson
- Date of birth: 24 March 1985 (age 41)
- Place of birth: Glasgow, Scotland
- Height: 5 ft 11 in (1.80 m)
- Position: Forward

Team information
- Current team: Arthurlie

Senior career*
Years	Team	Apps	(Gls)
2002–2005	Ayr United	55	(11)
2005–2006	Dundee	15	(2)
2006–2007	Clyde	22	(3)
2007–2009	Alloa Athletic	24	(9)
2009	→ Stenhousemuir (loan)	3	(0)
2010–2011	Airdrie United	6	(2)
- * Club domestic league appearances and goals as of 7 August 2011

Andrew David Ferguson (born 24 March 1985 in Glasgow), is a Scottish football striker currently with Arthurlie.

== Career ==
Ferguson began his career with Ayr United, where he scored 11 times in 55 league games. In the summer of 2005, Ferguson was signed by Dundee, but had a limited impact, making only two starts and scoring two goals all season.

Ferguson signed for Clyde in the summer 2006, and made his début in the Scottish Football League First Division against Partick Thistle. He made 26 appearances overall for Clyde, scoring 4 goals. After his contract expired, Ferguson signed for Alloa Athletic in June 2007. In March 2009 he joined Stenhousemuir on loan, before being released by Alloa at the end of the season.

Ferguson has since played for Glenafton Athletic, Airdrie United and Arthurlie.
