= Paul McHale (footballer) =

Scottish footballer and agent

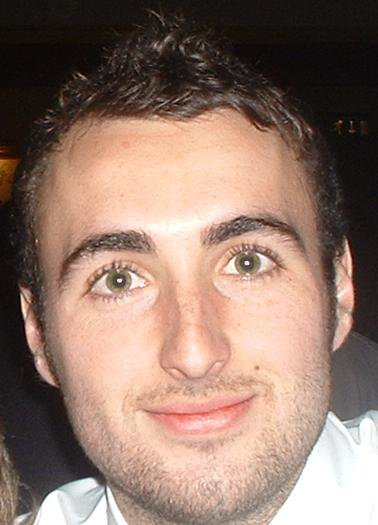

Personal information
- Full name: Paul McHale
- Date of birth: 30 September 1981 (age 45)
- Place of birth: Stirling, Scotland
- Position: Midfielder

Senior career*
Years	Team	Apps	(Gls)
1998–2004	Rangers	0	(0)
2003–2004	→ St Mirren (loan)	16	(1)
2004–2005	Cowdenbeath	29	(5)
2005–2007	Clyde	35	(5)
2007–2010	Dundee	96	(2)
2010–2011	Stirling Albion	23	(1)
2011–2012	Stenhousemuir	18	(1)
- * Club domestic league appearances and goals as of 28 August 2012

Paul McHale (born 30 September 1981 in (Stirling) is a Scottish retired Association footballer and current football agent.

== Career ==
McHale started his career with Rangers, but failed to play a senior game for them. He was loaned out to St Mirren in 2003.

He joined Sauchie Juniors in December 2003, With the club, the team reached the last eight of the Scottish Junior Cup, finished runners up in the Lothian First Division and won the Lothians & Fife Cup (4–0 v Linlithgow Rose). He scored five times (out of 5) from the penalty spot for the team. McHale spent the 2004–05 season at Cowdenbeath.

He became Graham Roberts' first signing for Clyde in the summer of 2005. Paul was handed the captain's armband, and has proved to be an influential leader. McHale missed most of season 2005–06 with a stomach injury, including the shock Scottish Cup victory over Celtic. McHale hoped to lift Clyde's first major trophy in 48 years in November 2006, the Scottish Challenge Cup, but Clyde lost out on a penalty shoot out.

In January 2006, he joined Dundee for a fee of £5,000. He was made redundant by the club in October 2010 when they entered administration. He then joined Stirling Albion until 3 January 2011, and then signed a contract extension in January which took him through to the end of the season.

== Honours ==
Sauchie Juniors

- Fife and Lothians Cup: 2003–04

== See also ==
- 2005–06 Clyde F.C. season | 2006–07
