= List of Scottish football transfers 2008–09 =

This is a list of Scottish football transfers for the 2008–09 season. Only moves featuring at least one 2008–09 Scottish Premier League club or one 2008–09 Scottish First Division club are listed.

== May 2008 – December 2008 ==
Date	Name	Moving from	Moving to	Fee
1 May 2008	Ryan Baldacchino	Gretna	Altona Magic	Free
1 May 2008	Gavin Swankie	Dundee	St Johnstone	Free
1 May 2008	Chris Millar	Greenock Morton	St Johnstone	Free
6 May 2008	Collin Samuel	Toronto	St Johnstone	Free
6 May 2008	Scott Morrison	Dunfermline Athletic	Ross County	Free
6 May 2008	Richie Hart	Inverness Caledonian Thistle	Ross County	Free
6 May 2008	Steven Craig	Livingston	Ross County	Free
7 May 2008	Sean Murdoch	Dunfermline Athletic	Hamilton	Free
7 May 2008	Mickaël Antoine-Curier	Hibernian	Dundee	Free
7 May 2008	Sean Anderson	Dundee	East Stirlingshire	Free
7 May 2008	Colin Cramb	Stirling Albion	East Stirlingshire	Free
9 May 2008	Paul Paton	Queen's Park	Partick Thistle	Free
13 May 2008	Jackie McNamara	Aberdeen	Falkirk	Free
13 May 2008	Dermot McCaffrey	Hibernian	Falkirk	Free
13 May 2008	Ian Maxwell	St Mirren	Partick Thistle	Free
14 May 2008	Lee Bullen	Sheffield Wednesday	Falkirk	Free
14 May 2008	Neil McCann	Heart of Midlothian	Falkirk	Free
14 May 2008	Allan Russell	Airdrie United	Kilmarnock	Free
14 May 2008	Stewart Kean	St Mirren	Queen of the South	Free
14 May 2008	Laurie Ellis	Stirling Albion	Raith Rovers	Free
14 May 2008	Colin Stewart	Livingston	Greenock Morton	Free
15 May 2008	Euan McLean	Dundee United	St Johnstone	Free
19 May 2008	Austin McCann	Notts County	Dunfermline Athletic	Free
19 May 2008	Steven Bell	Stirling Albion	Dunfermline Athletic	Free
19 May 2008	Graeme Holmes	Airdrie United	Dunfermline Athletic	Free
19 May 2008	Stuart Kettlewell	Queen's Park	Clyde	Free
20 May 2008	Mark Gilhaney	Hamilton Academical	Dundee	Free
21 May 2008	Pedro Moutinho	Falkirk	Maritimo	Free
21 May 2008	Greg Fleming	Gretna	Oldham Athletic	Free
21 May 2008	David McGurn	Greenock Morton	Raith Rovers	Free
21 May 2008	Gary O'Connor	Berwick Rangers	Raith Rovers	Free
21 May 2008	Bryan Prunty	Airdrie United	Ayr United	Free
21 May 2008	Dean Keenan	Greenock Morton	Ayr United	Free
25 May 2008	Steven Masterton	Clyde	Greenock Morton	Free
27 May 2008	Darren Young	Dunfermline Athletic	Dundee	Free
27 May 2008	Steven Robb	Dundee United	St Mirren	Free
28 May 2008	Bertrand Bossu	Walsall	Aberdeen	Free
28 May 2008	Sammy Stewart	Glenavon	Aberdeen	Free
28 May 2008	John O'Neill	Queen of the South	Stirling Albion	Free
29 May 2008	Filip Šebo	Rangers	Valenciennes	£1,000,000
30 May 2008	Roman Bednář	Heart of Midlothian	West Bromwich Albion	£2,300,000
2 June 2008	Guillaume Beuzelin	Hibernian	Coventry City	Free
2 June 2008	Ricky Waddell	Airdrie United	Clyde	Free
2 June 2008	Alan Trouten	Queen's Park	Clyde	Free
3 June 2008	Scott Robertson	Dundee	Dundee United	Free
3 June 2008	Erik Schultz-Eklund	Gretna	Falkirk	Free
4 June 2008	Allan McManus	St Johnstone	Greenock Morton	Undisclosed
5 June 2008	Richard Brittain	St Mirren	Ross County	Free
5 June 2008	Goran Stanić	St Johnstone	East Fife	Free
5 June 2008	Robert Campbell	Queen of the South	East Fife	Free
6 June 2008	Gavin Skelton	Gretna	Kilmarnock	Free
7 June 2008	Dyron Daal	Fuenlabrada	Ross County	Free
9 June 2008	Andy Webster	Wigan Athletic	Rangers	Undisclosed
10 June 2008	Ibrahim Tall	Heart of Midlothian	Nantes	Free
10 June 2008	David Worrell	Dundee	Montrose	Free
11 June 2008	Mark Burchill	Dunfermline Athletic	Rotherham United	Free
12 June 2008	Abdul Osman	Gretna	Northampton Town	Free
13 June 2008	Kenny Miller	Derby County	Rangers	£2,000,000
13 June 2008	Iain Campbell	Kilmarnock	Alloa Athletic	Free
13 June 2008	Allan Walker	Livingston	Raith Rovers	Free
13 June 2008	Martin Grehan	Motherwell	Stirling Albion	Free
16 June 2008	Andrius Velička	Viking	Rangers	£1,000,000
17 June 2008	Michael McGovern	Celtic	Dundee United	Free
17 June 2008	Andis Shala	Mannheim	Dundee United	Free
19 June 2008	Kyle Lafferty	Burnley	Rangers	£3,500,000
19 June 2008	Paddy McCourt	Derry City	Celtic	£100,000
20 June 2008	Franco Miranda	C.A.I.	St Mirren	Loan
23 June 2008	Paul Dixon	Dundee	Dundee United	Undisclosed
24 June 2008	Kevin McDonald	Dundee	Burnley	£500,000
24 June 2008	Andrew Barrowman	Ross County	Inverness Caledonian Thistle	Free
24 June 2008	Ryan McCann	Queen of the South	Morecambe	Free
24 June 2008	Stevie Murray	Partick Thistle	Dumbarton	Free
25 June 2008	Paul di Giacomo	Kilmarnock	Airdrie United	Free
25 June 2008	Stephen Grindlay	Queen of the South	Ayr United	Free
26 June 2008	Christian Kalvenes	Dundee United	Burnley	Free
26 June 2008	Craig Barr	Gretna	Queen of the South	Free
27 June 2008	Graham Bayne	Inverness Caledonian Thistle	Dunfermline Athletic	£30,000
27 June 2008	Jimmy Gibson	Clyde	East Stirlingshire	Free
27 June 2008	Jean-José Cuenca	Angoulême	Livingston	Undisclosed
27 June 2008	Adam Coakley	Greenock Morton	Queen's Park	Free
28 June 2008	Ross McCormack	Motherwell	Cardiff City	£100,000
30 June 2008	Burton O'Brien	Sheffield Wednesday	Falkirk	Free
30 June 2008	Barry Nicholson	Aberdeen	Preston North End	Free
30 June 2008	Adam Virgo	Celtic	Brighton & Hove Albion	Free
1 July 2008	Liam Craig	Falkirk	St Johnstone	£25,000
1 July 2008	Mark Corcoran	St Mirren	Hamilton Academical	Free
1 July 2008	Derek Lyle	Dundee	Hamilton Academical	Free
1 July 2008	Gary McDonald	Oldham Athletic	Aberdeen	Free
1 July 2008	Jack Ross	Falkirk	St Mirren	Free
1 July 2008	Eric Paton	Queen of the South	Dundee	Free
1 July 2008	Tom Brighton	Millwall	St Mirren	Free
1 July 2008	David van Zanten	St Mirren	Hibernian	Free
1 July 2008	Dennis Wyness	Inverness Caledonian Thistle	St Mirren	Free
1 July 2008	Marc McCusker	Heart of Midlothian	Clyde	Free
1 July 2008	Lionel Djebi-Zadi	SC Verl	Inverness Caledonian Thistle	Free
1 July 2008	Diarmuid O'Carroll	Celtic	Morecambe	Free
1 July 2008	Thomas Buffel	Rangers	Cercle Brugge	Free
1 July 2008	Craig McKeown	Clyde	Dundee	Free
1 July 2008	Davie Ross	Aberdeen	Peterhead	Free
1 July 2008	Neil McVitie	Aberdeen	Peterhead	Free
1 July 2008	Martin Skinner	Aberdeen	Peterhead	Free
2 July 2008	Willo Flood	Cardiff City	Dundee United	Loan
2 July 2008	Anthony McParland	Wycombe Wanderers	Livingston	Undisclosed
4 July 2008	Kenny Milne	Falkirk	Scunthorpe United	Free
4 July 2008	Karim Touzani	Aberdeen	Sparta Rotterdam	Free
4 July 2008	Ashley Young	Bury	Falkirk	Free
4 July 2008	José Gonçalves	Heart of Midlothian	Nürnberg	Loan
6 July 2008	Andy Lawrie	St Johnstone	Stirling Albion	Free
7 July 2008	Warren Feeney	Cardiff City	Dundee United	Loan
7 July 2008	Mark Kerr	Dundee United	Aberdeen	Free
7 July 2008	Derek Holmes	Rotherham United	St Johnstone	Free
8 July 2008	Jon Newby	Morecambe	Greenock Morton	Free
8 July 2008	Dean McDonald	Inverness Caledonian Thistle	Rushden & Diamonds	Free
8 July 2008	Robert Malcolm	Unattached	Motherwell	Free
11 July 2008	Francisco Sandaza	Valencia Mestalla	Dundee United	Free
11 July 2008	Jamie Adams	Kilmarnock	Queen of the South	Loan
11 July 2008	Paul Cairney	Queen's Park	Partick Thistle	Undisclosed
11 July 2008	Paul Cairney	Partick Thistle	Queen's Park	Loan
11 July 2008	Calum Reidford	Rangers	Dunfermline Athletic	Free
13 July 2008	Bryn Halliwell	Hamilton Academical	Queen of the South	Free
13 July 2008	Joe Cardle	Port Vale	Airdrie United	Free
13 July 2008	Eddie Mearns	Heart of Midlothian	Dundee	Free
13 July 2008	Raffaele De Vita	Blackburn Rovers	Livingston	Free
13 July 2008	Jason Talbot	Port Vale	Livingston	Free
13 July 2008	Giordano Vanin	Parma	Livingston	Free
15 July 2008	Georgios Samaras	Manchester City	Celtic	£1,200,000
15 July 2008	Matty Hughes	Rochdale	Celtic	Undisclosed
15 July 2008	Charlie Mulgrew	Wolverhampton Wanderers	Aberdeen	Undisclosed
15 July 2008	Chris Innes	Unattached	Livingston	Free
15 July 2008	Jeroen van den Broeck	Rangers	AGOVV Apeldoorn	Free
17 July 2008	Ryan Esson	Hereford United	Inverness Caledonian Thistle	Free
17 July 2008	Scott McLaughlin	Greenock Morton	Airdrie United	Free
17 July 2008	Brian Graham	Greenock Morton	East Stirlingshire	Loan
19 July 2008	Bobby Barr	St Johnstone	Albion Rovers	Free
20 July 2008	Jim Lauchlan	Queen of the South	Dundee	Free
20 July 2008	David Nixon	Motherwell	Airdrie United	Free
20 July 2008	Jamie Stevenson	Greenock Morton	Alloa Athletic	Loan
21 July 2008	Giordano Vanin	Livingston	Parma	Free
21 July 2008	Craig Gunn	Ross County	Peterhead	Loan
21 July 2008	Daniel Moore	Ross County	Peterhead	Loan
22 July 2008	Lucas Akins	Huddersfield Town	Hamilton Academical	Free
22 July 2008	Michael McGowan	Clyde	Queen of the South	Free
22 July 2008	Gary Arbuckle	Clyde	Queen of the South	Free
23 July 2008	Noel Hunt	Dundee United	Reading	£600,000
23 July 2008	Matthew Hazley	Stoke City	Airdrie United	Free
23 July 2008	Michael Ohnesorge	Elversberg	Clyde	Free
23 July 2008	Stephen Crawford	Dunfermline Athletic	East Fife	Free
23 July 2008	Gary Twigg	Hamilton Academical	Brechin City	Free
23 July 2008	David Murray	St Mirren	Queen's Park	Free
23 July 2008	Simon Lynch	Queensland Roar	Airdrie United	Free
23 July 2008	Darren Brady	Ross County	Forfar Athletic	Free
25 July 2008	Kevin Smith	Dundee United	Raith Rovers	Loan
25 July 2008	Damon Gray	Hibernian	Partick Thistle	Loan
25 July 2008	Stephen McGuire	Motherwell	Airdrie United	Free
25 July 2008	Scott Gemmill	Berwick Rangers	Clyde	Free
25 July 2008	Michael White	Dundee	Dumbarton	Free
26 July 2008	Peter McMahon	Falkirk	Berwick Rangers	Free
26 July 2008	Mark Lunn	Livingston	Berwick Rangers	Free
26 July 2008	Cammy Bell	Kilmarnock	Queen of the South	Loan
27 July 2008	John Kennedy	Celtic	Norwich City	Loan
28 July 2008	Conor Sammon	Derry City	Kilmarnock	Undisclosed
29 July 2008	Steven Thicot	Nantes	Hibernian	Free
29 July 2008	Joe Keenan	Melbourne Victory	Hibernian	Free
29 July 2008	Phil Cave	Gateshead	Livingston	Free
31 July 2008	Madjid Bougherra	Charlton Athletic	Rangers	£2,500,000
31 July 2008	Marius Niculae	Inverness Caledonian Thistle	Dinamo Bucharest	£400,000
1 August 2008	Andy Kirk	Yeovil Town	Dunfermline Athletic	Undisclosed
2 August 2008	Colin Cameron	Milton Keynes Dons	Dundee	Free
2 August 2008	Rab Douglas	Leicester City	Dundee	Free
4 August 2008	Tonet	CE L'Hospitalet	St Mirren	Free
6 August 2008	Dominic Shimmin	Unattached	Greenock Morton	Free
6 August 2008	David Obua	Kaizer Chiefs	Heart of Midlothian	Free
6 August 2008	Steve Lovell	Aberdeen	Falkirk	Free
7 August 2008	Brian Carrigan	Linlithgow Rose	Hamilton Academical	£17,500
7 August 2008	Manuel Pascali	Parma	Kilmarnock	Undisclosed
7 August 2008	Chris Pozniak	Chivas USA	Dundee	Undisclosed
7 August 2008	Rocco Quinn	Celtic	Livingston	Loan
8 August 2008	Tommy Wright	Darlington	Aberdeen	£75,000
8 August 2008	James O'Brien	Celtic	Motherwell	Undisclosed
8 August 2008	Gunnar Nielsen	Blackburn Rovers	Motherwell	Loan
8 August 2008	Fabián Yantorno	Unattached	Hibernian	Free
8 August 2008	Abdessalam Benjelloun	Hibernian	Charleroi	Loan
8 August 2008	Roy O'Donovan	Sunderland	Dundee United	Loan
8 August 2008	Michael Brown	Macarthur Rams	Airdrie United	Free
10 August 2008	Darren Williams	Unattached	Dundee	Free
10 August 2008	Marc Crosas	Barcelona	Celtic	£415,000
11 August 2008	Mike Tullberg	Reggina	Heart of Midlothian	Loan
11 August 2008	Joël Thomas	Unattached	Hamilton Academical	Free
12 August 2008	Steve Pinau	Genoa	Hibernian	Loan
12 August 2008	Carlos Cuéllar	Rangers	Aston Villa	£7,800,000
13 August 2008	Donovan Simmonds	Coventry City	Kilmarnock	Loan
13 August 2008	Sebastian Sorsa	Leeds United	Hamilton Academical	Undisclosed
13 August 2008	Aarón Ñíguez	Valencia	Rangers	Loan
14 August 2008	Scott Cuthbert	Celtic	St Mirren	Loan
14 August 2008	Scott Flinders	Crystal Palace	Falkirk	Loan
14 August 2008	Marian Kello	Kaunas	Heart of Midlothian	Undisclosed
15 August 2008	Pedro Mendes	Portsmouth	Rangers	£3,000,000
15 August 2008	Adam Rooney	Stoke City	Inverness Caledonian Thistle	£50,000
15 August 2008	Guy Kerr	Inverness Caledonian Thistle	Elgin City	Loan
15 August 2008	Craig Campbell	Inverness Caledonian Thistle	Elgin City	Loan
15 August 2008	Kevin Bradley	Clyde	Montrose	Free
16 August 2008	Steven Lennon	Rangers	Partick Thistle	Loan
16 August 2008	Mark Weir	Rangers	Kilmarnock	Loan
16 August 2008	Glenn Loovens	Cardiff City	Celtic	Undisclosed
17 August 2008	Maurice Edu	Toronto	Rangers	£2,600,000
18 August 2008	Andy Webster	Rangers	Bristol City	Loan
18 August 2008	Clayton Donaldson	Hibernian	Crewe Alexandra	Undisclosed
19 August 2008	John Sutton	Wycombe Wanderers	Motherwell	Undisclosed
20 August 2008	Johnny Russell	Dundee United	Forfar Athletic	Loan
20 August 2008	Roddy McKenzie	Unattached	Livingston	Free
21 August 2008	Nick McKoy	Unattached	St Johnstone	Free
21 August 2008	Evander Sno	Celtic	Ajax	Undisclosed
21 August 2008	Steven Davis	Fulham	Rangers	£3,000,000
22 August 2008	Shaun Maloney	Aston Villa	Celtic	£2,500,000
22 August 2008	Steven Weir	Livingston	Arbroath	Free
22 August 2008	Simon Wiles	Blackpool	Dunfermline Athletic	Free
25 August 2008	János Balogh	Debreceni	Heart of Midlothian	Loan
26 August 2008	Alan Morgan	Kilmarnock	St Johnstone	Loan
26 August 2008	Calum Elliot	Heart of Midlothian	Livingston	Loan
27 August 2008	David Weatherston	St Johnstone	Queen of the South	Undisclosed
27 August 2008	Tom Parratt	Hamilton Academical	Queen of the South	Undisclosed
28 August 2008	John Gibson	Dundee United	Forfar Athletic	Loan
28 August 2008	Adrian Mrowiec	Kaunas	Heart of Midlothian	Undisclosed
28 August 2008	Jared Hodgkiss	West Bromwich Albion	Aberdeen	Loan
28 August 2008	Dean Furman	Rangers	Bradford City	Loan
29 August 2008	Stephen Ettien	Unattached	Hamilton Academical	Free
29 August 2008	Michael Videira	Unattached	Hamilton Academical	Free
29 August 2008	Chris Casement	Ipswich Town	Hamilton Academical	Loan
30 August 2008	Sean Fleming	Dundee United	Peterhead	Loan
1 September 2008	Sol Bamba	Dunfermline Athletic	Hibernian	Undisclosed
1 September 2008	Sone Aluko	Birmingham City	Aberdeen	Undisclosed
1 September 2008	Jon Newby	Greenock Morton	Burton Albion	Loan
1 September 2008	Paul McLeod	Hamilton Academical	Dumbarton	Free
1 September 2008	Derek Riordan	Celtic	Hibernian	Undisclosed
1 September 2008	Scott Gallacher	Rangers	Cowdenbeath	Loan
1 September 2008	John Armstrong	Heart of Midlothian	Cowdenbeath	Loan
1 September 2008	Martin Canning	Hibernian	Hamilton Academical	Free
1 September 2008	Craig Sives	Heart of Midlothian	Queen of the South	Loan
1 September 2008	Alan Lowing	Rangers	Clyde	Loan
1 September 2008	Paul Emslie	Rangers	Clyde	Loan
1 September 2008	Derek Soutar	Unattached	Ross County	Free
1 September 2008	Dene Shields	Ross County	East Fife	Loan
1 September 2008	Maroš Klimpl	Midtjylland	Motherwell	Loan
1 September 2008	Alan Gow	Rangers	Blackpool	Loan
1 September 2008	Daniel Cousin	Rangers	Hull City	Undisclosed
5 September 2008	Chris Smith	Rangers	Greenock Morton	Free
5 September 2008	Stephen Simmons	Dunfermline Athletic	Queen of the South	Free
6 September 2008	Scott Murray	Unattached	Partick Thistle	Free
12 September 2008	Jamie Barclay	Falkirk	East Stirlingshire	Loan
12 September 2008	Kevin Watt	Airdrie United	Albion Rovers	Loan
14 September 2008	Greg Ross	Dunfermline Athletic	Cowdenbeath	Loan
17 September 2008	Ricky Little	Partick Thistle	Queen's Park	Loan
18 September 2008	Sean Lynch	Unattached	Falkirk	Free
18 September 2008	Craig Molloy	St Mirren	Stirling Albion	Loan
20 September 2008	David Armstrong	Heart of Midlothian	Raith Rovers	Loan
20 September 2008	Ross Campbell	Hibernian	Dunfermline Athletic	Loan
23 September 2008	Michael Paton	Aberdeen	Brechin City	Loan
2 October 2008	Lee Robinson	Rangers	St Johnstone	Loan
17 October 2008	James Grady	Hamilton Academical	Greenock Morton	Loan
17 October 2008	David McGowan	Clyde	Arbroath	Loan
30 October 2008	Alan Lithgow	Unattached	Clyde	Free
7 November 2008	Greg Kelly	Montrose	St Johnstone	Loan
15 November 2008	Scott Gibb	Falkirk	Stirling Albion	Loan
19 November 2008	Andrew Shinnie	Rangers	Dundee	Loan
23 November 2008	Stuart Smith	Aberdeen	Peterhead	Loan
28 November 2008	John Hillcoat	Unattached	St Johnstone	Free
7 December 2008	Steven Kinniburgh	Rangers	Queen of the South	Loan
12 December 2008	Rory Loy	Rangers	Dunfermline Athletic	Loan
16 December 2008	Niall McGinn	Derry City	Celtic	Undisclosed
23 December 2008	Milan Mišůn	Příbram	Celtic	Undisclosed
26 December 2008	Paul Hanlon	Hibernian	St Johnstone	Loan
30 December 2008	Lee Robinson	Rangers	Queen of the South	Loan
30 December 2008	Barry Wilson	Inverness Caledonian Thistle	Queen of the South	Free
30 December 2008	Steven Thomson	Brighton & Hove Albion	St Mirren	Undisclosed
31 December 2008	Tony Stevenson	Hamilton Academical	Clyde	Loan
31 December 2008	Craig O'Reilly	East Fife	Clyde	Free
31 December 2008	Graham Gartland	Drogheda United	St Johnstone	Free

== January 2009 – April 2009 ==
Date	Name	Moving from	Moving to	Fee
1 January 2009	Jean-Claude Darcheville	Rangers	Valenciennes	Free
1 January 2009	John Stewart	Falkirk	Ross County	Undisclosed
1 January 2009	Jonatan Johansson	Malmö	Hibernian	Free
2 January 2009	Gregorz Szamotulski	Ashdod	Hibernian	Free
2 January 2009	Artur Krysiak	Birmingham City	Motherwell	Loan
2 January 2009	Keith Watson	Dundee United	Forfar Athletic	Loan
2 January 2009	James Grady	Hamilton Academical	Greenock Morton	Free
3 January 2009	Kieran McAnespie	Greenock Morton	Dumbarton	Loan
6 January 2009	Ryan McCord	Dundee United	Stirling Albion	Loan
6 January 2009	Sean Fleming	Dundee United	Albion Rovers	Loan
7 January 2009	Paul McGowan	Celtic	Hamilton Academical	Loan
7 January 2009	Jordan McMillan	Rangers	Hamilton Academical	Loan
8 January 2009	Colin Cameron	Dundee	Arbroath	Loan
8 January 2009	Scott Anson	Kilmarnock	Annan Athletic	Loan
9 January 2009	Chris Burke	Rangers	Cardiff City	Free
9 January 2009	Kris Doolan	Auchinleck Talbot	Partick Thistle	Free
9 January 2009	Martyn Lancaster	Atlanta Silverbacks	Queen of the South	Free
9 January 2009	Jamie Mole	Heart of Midlothian	Dunfermline Athletic	Loan
9 January 2009	Thierry Gathuessi	Hibernian	Inverness Caledonian Thistle	Undisclosed
9 January 2009	Filipe Morais	Hibernian	Inverness Caledonian Thistle	Undisclosed
9 January 2009	David Cox	Kilmarnock	Elgin City	Free
10 January 2009	Pavels Mihadjuks	Ventspils	Inverness Caledonian Thistle	Undisclosed
10 January 2009	Keith Watson	Dundee United	Forfar Athletic	Loan
13 January 2009	Steven Pressley	Unattached	Falkirk	Free
14 January 2009	Richie Byrne	Unattached	Inverness Caledonian Thistle	Free
15 January 2009	Steven Tweed	East Fife	Montrose	Free
16 January 2009	David Winters	Ross County	Livingston	Free
16 January 2009	Danny Griffin	Ross County	Livingston	Free
16 January 2009	Javan Vidal	Manchester City	Aberdeen	Loan
17 January 2009	Kenny Connolly	Motherwell	Ayr United	Free
17 January 2009	Stuart Noble	Airdrie United	Alloa Athletic	Loan
19 January 2009	Kenny Deuchar	Real Salt Lake	Hamilton Academical	Free
20 January 2009	David Graham	Hamilton Academical	Dunfermline Athletic	Free
21 January 2009	Tony Bullock	Ross County	Montrose	Free
22 January 2009	Dani Mallo	Braga	Falkirk	Free
23 January 2009	Dénes Rósa	Wolverhampton Wanderers	Hibernian	Free
24 January 2009	Ross Forbes	Motherwell	Dumbarton	Loan
24 January 2009	Ryan McCann	Morecambe	Queen of the South	Free
24 January 2009	Gordon Pope	Dundee United	Montrose	Loan
24 January 2009	Lucas Akins	Hamilton Academical	Partick Thistle	Loan
24 January 2009	Sebastian Sorsa	Hamilton Academical	HJK Helsinki	Free
25 January 2009	Grégory Tadé	Stranraer	Clyde	Undisclosed
25 January 2009	Stephen Connolly	Clyde	Stranraer	Loan
25 January 2009	Jordan Murch	Clyde	Stranraer	Loan
26 January 2009	Barry Smith	Dundee	Brechin City	Loan
27 January 2009	Armand One	TPS	Livingston	Free
28 January 2009	Jeffrey de Visscher	Aberdeen	SC Cambuur	Undisclosed
29 January 2009	Kevin Kyle	Coventry City	Kilmarnock	Undisclosed
29 January 2009	Jamie Stevenson	Greenock Morton	East Stirlingshire	Loan
30 January 2009	Willo Flood	Cardiff City	Celtic	Undisclosed
30 January 2009	Richie Foran	Southend United	Inverness Caledonian Thistle	Undisclosed
30 January 2009	Eric Odhiambo	Leicester City	Inverness Caledonian Thistle	Free
30 January 2009	Stuart Smith	Aberdeen	Peterhead	Undisclosed
30 January 2009	James McPake	Livingston	Coventry City	Undisclosed
31 January 2009	Chris Killen	Celtic	Norwich City	Loan
31 January 2009	Stephen Ettien	Hamilton Academical	Brechin City	Loan
31 January 2009	Chris Porter	Motherwell	Derby County	£400,000
31 January 2009	John Baird	Montrose	Airdrie United	Undisclosed
1 February 2009	Mark Roberts	Airdrie United	Partick Thistle	Free
1 February 2009	Georgios Efrem	Rangers	Dundee	Loan
2 February 2009	John Sullivan	Bohemians	Hamilton Academical	Undisclosed
2 February 2009	Padriac Ormsby	Bohemians	Hamilton Academical	Undisclosed
2 February 2009	Cillian Sheridan	Celtic	Motherwell	Loan
2 February 2009	Semih Aydilek	Birmingham City	Motherwell	Loan
2 February 2009	Rocco Quinn	Celtic	Hamilton Academical	Undisclosed
2 February 2009	Alan Gow	Rangers	Norwich City	Loan
2 February 2009	Don Cowie	Inverness Caley Thistle	Watford	Undisclosed
2 February 2009	Paul Caddis	Celtic	Dundee United	Loan
2 February 2009	Christophe Berra	Heart of Midlothian	Wolverhampton Wanderers	£2,500,000
2 February 2009	Charlie Adam	Rangers	Blackpool	Loan
2 February 2009	Brian Kerr	Unattached	Inverness Caledonian Thistle	Free
2 February 2009	János Balogh	Debreceni VSC	Heart of Midlothian	£180,000
2 February 2009	Filip Twardzik	Hertha Berlin	Celtic	Undisclosed
2 February 2009	Patrik Twardzik	Hertha Berlin	Celtic	Undisclosed
2 February 2009	Martyn Corrigan	Kilmarnock	Ross County	Free
3 February 2009	Johnny Russell	Dundee United	Forfar Athletic	Loan
3 February 2009	James Wesolowski	Leicester City	Dundee United	Loan
5 February 2009	Craig Brewster	Unattached	Ross County	Free
12 February 2009	Mohammed Camara	Derby County	St Mirren	Loan
20 February 2009	Richie Byrne	Inverness Caledonian Thistle	St Johnstone	Loan
24 February 2009	Graham Barrett	Falkirk	St Johnstone	Free
24 February 2009	Graham Carey	Celtic	Bohemians	Loan
24 February 2009	Greg Cameron	Dundee United	Shamrock Rovers	Loan
7 March 2009	Kevin James	St Johnstone	Ayr United	Loan
21 March 2009	Ross Harvey	Rangers	Brechin City	Loan
21 March 2009	Craig O'Reilly	Clyde	Montrose	Loan
21 March 2009	Lamine Diatta	Unattached	Hamilton Academical	Free
21 March 2009	Andreu Ramos Isus	Deportivo Santa Eulalia Ibiza	Hamilton Academical	Free
31 March 2009	Steven Old	Unattached	Kilmarnock	Free
31 March 2009	Robbie Winters	Unattached	Clyde	Free
31 March 2009	Derek Asamoah	Unattached	Hamilton Academical	Free
31 March 2009	Christy Fagan	Unattached	Hamilton Academical	Free
31 March 2009	Lamine Diatta	Hamilton Academical	Al-Ahli	Free
