= 2009–10 Queen of the South F.C. season =

Queen of the South
2009–10 season
- Chairman: Davie Rae
- Manager: Gordon Chisholm; Kenny Brannigan
- Stadium: Palmerston Park
- First Division: 4th
- Challenge Cup: Third round
- League Cup: Third round
- Scottish Cup: Third round
- Top goalscorer: League: Derek Holmes (12); All: Derek Holmes (12)
- Highest home attendance: 6,120 vs Rangers League Cup 23 September 2009
- Lowest home attendance: 1,183 vs Ross County First Division 20 April 2010
- Average home league attendance: League: 2,364

The 2009–10 season was Queen of the South's eighth consecutive season in the Scottish First Division, having been promoted from the Scottish Second Division at the end of the 2001–02 season. Queens also competed in the Challenge Cup, League Cup and the Scottish Cup.

== Summary ==
Queen of the South finished fourth in the First Division. They reached the third round of the Challenge Cup, the third round of the League Cup and the third round of the Scottish Cup.

=== Management ===
The club was managed during season 2009–10 by Gordon Chisholm. On 22 March 2010, Chisholm left the club to become the new manager of Dundee, taking coach Billy Dodds with him to become his assistant manager. Chisholm's assistant Kenny Brannigan was appointed as manager until the end of the season although his contract was extended in April, until May 2011.

== Results and fixtures ==
Win Draw Loss

=== Scottish First Division ===
8 August 2009 Scottish First Division	Queen of the South	1–1	Raith Rovers	Palmerston Park
	Tosh (red card) 37'; Holmes 90'	BBC Report	Walker 45'; Campbell (red card) 45'	Attendance: 2,565; Referee: Norris

15 August 2009 Scottish First Division	Airdrie United	1–1	Queen of the South	Excelsior Stadium
	Donnelly 81'	SFL Report	Kean 70'	Attendance: 1,079; Referee: Charleston

22 August 2009 Scottish First Division	Queen of the South	1–0	Partick Thistle	Palmerston Park
	Weatherston 82'	ESPN Report		Attendance: 2,915; Referee: Richmond

29 August 2009 Scottish First Division	Queen of the South	2–0	Ayr United	Palmerston Park
	McLaren 45'; Quinn 63'	BBC Report		Attendance: 3,034; Referee: Collum

12 September 2009 Scottish First Division	Ross County	3–2	Queen of the South	Victoria Park
	Brittain 46' (Penalty); Craig 48'; Gardyne 75'	BBC Report	Holmes 5'; Kean 52' (Penalty)	Attendance: 1,992; Referee: McLean

19 September 2009 Scottish First Division	Queen of the South	2–0	Dundee	Palmerston Park
	Tosh 6' (pen.); Holmes 61'	BBC Report	Bullock (red card) 5'	Attendance: 2,875; Referee: Robertson

26 September 2009 Scottish First Division	Dunfermline Athletic	1–4	Queen of the South	East End Park
	Phinn 37'	BBC Report	Wyness 33'; Burns 39', 42'; Holmes 45' (pen.)	Attendance: 2,624; Referee: McDermott

3 October 2009 Scottish First Division	Queen of the South	2–3	Greenock Morton	Palmerston Park
	Wilson 86'; Kean 90'	BBC Report	Graham 13'; Weatherson 39'; Jenkins 60'	Attendance: 2,630; Referee: McDonald

10 October 2009 Scottish First Division	Inverness Caledonian Thistle	1–3	Queen of the South	Caledonian Stadium
	Hayes 18'	BBC Report	Holmes 1', 83', 90'	Attendance: 3,011; Referee: Brines

17 October 2009 Scottish First Division	Raith Rovers	1–0	Queen of the South	Stark's Park
	Russell 75'	BBC Report		Attendance: 2,147; Referee: Richmond

24 October 2009 Scottish First Division	Queen of the South	3–0	Airdrie United	Palmerston Park
	Kean 41'; Lilley 27'; Wyness 83'	SFL Report		Attendance: 2,094; Referee: Charleston

31 October 2009 Scottish First Division	Queen of the South	2–0	Ross County	Palmerston Park
	Burns 26'; Kean 43'	BBC Report		Attendance: 2,245; Referee: McKendrick

7 November 2009 Scottish First Division	Ayr United	0–1	Queen of the South	Somerset Park
		BBC Report	Holmes 20'	Attendance: 2,453; Referee: McKendrick

14 November 2009 Scottish First Division	Dundee	0–0	Queen of the South	Dens Park
		BBC Report		Attendance: 4,901; Referee: Law

1 December 2009 Scottish First Division	Queen of the South	1–2	Dunfermline Athletic	Palmerston Park
	Weatherston 17'	BBC Report	McDougall 35'; Bell 58'	Attendance: 1,651; Referee: Thomson

5 December 2009 Scottish First Division	Queen of the South	1–1	Inverness Caledonian Thistle	Palmerston Park
	Harris 75'; Lilley (red card) 77'	BBC Report	Hayes 18'; Foran (yellow card) 75' (red card); Duncan (red card) 77'	Attendance: 2,196; Referee: Muir

12 December 2009 Scottish First Division	Greenock Morton	1–2	Queen of the South	Cappielow Park
	Weatherson 23'	BBC Report	Burns 31'; Holmes 64'	Attendance: 1,814; Referee: Nicholls

26 December 2009 Scottish First Division	Partick Thistle	2–2	Queen of the South	Firhill Stadium
	Paton 20'; Adams 63'	BBC Report	Quinn 57'; Harris 80'	Attendance: 2,500; Referee: McLean

23 January 2010 Scottish First Division	Queen of the South	1–1	Dundee	Palmerston Park
	Harris 6'	BBC Report	Griffiths 77'	Attendance: 3,415; Referee: Richmond

13 February 2010 Scottish First Division	Queen of the South	1–2	Greenock Morton	Palmerston Park
	Weatherston 72'	BBC Report	Masterton 7', 31' (Penalty); Finlayson (yellow card) 77' (red card)	Attendance: 2,611; Referee: Brown

16 February 2010 Scottish First Division	Queen of the South	3–0	Ayr United	Palmerston Park
	Kean 19' (Penalty); McKenna 57'; Weatherston 70'	ESPN Report	Samson (red card) 16'	Attendance: 1,721; Referee: Muir

6 March 2010 Scottish First Division	Queen of the South	1–0	Partick Thistle	Palmerston Park
	Kean 54'	BBC Report		Attendance: 2,674; Referee: McDonald

9 March 2010 Scottish First Division	Inverness Caledonian Thistle	3–1	Queen of the South	Caledonian Stadium
	Rooney 42', 52', 76' (Penalty)	BBC Report	Holmes 61' (pen.)	Attendance: 3,003; Referee: Allan

13 March 2010 Scottish First Division	Dunfermline Athletic	3–1	Queen of the South	East End Park
	McDougall 18'; Woods 43', (red card) 88'; Bell 86' (pen.)	BBC Report	Weatherston 69'; McKenna (red card) 90'	Attendance: 2,163; Referee: Nicholls

20 March 2010 Scottish First Division	Ayr United	3–0	Queen of the South	Somerset Park
	McManus 25'; McKay 79'; Roberts 89' (Penalty)	BBC Report		Attendance: 2,139; Referee: Hilland

23 March 2010 Scottish First Division	Dundee	1–1	Queen of the South	Dens Park
	Griffiths 16' (pen.)	BBC Report	McAusland (red card) 16'; Harris 58'	Attendance: 4,508; Referee: Tumilty

27 March 2010 Scottish First Division	Queen of the South	2–0	Dunfermline Athletic	Palmerston Park
	McLaren 45'; Weatherston 71'	BBC Report	Cardle (yellow card) 81' (red card)	Attendance: 2,298; Referee: Muir

3 April 2010 Scottish First Division	Greenock Morton	3–3	Queen of the South	Cappielow Park
	Witteveen 15', 22' (92)	ESPN Report	Quinn 10', 52'; Weatherston 65'	Attendance: 1,926; Referee: McKendrick

6 April 2010 Scottish First Division	Ross County	1–1	Queen of the South	Victoria Park
	Boyd 90'	BBC Report	Burns 64'; McMillan (yellow card) 53' (red card)	Attendance: 2,004; Referee: McLean

10 April 2010 Scottish First Division	Queen of the South	1–3	Inverness Caledonian Thistle	Palmerston Park
	McLaren 10'; Harris (red card) 74'	BBC Report	Rooney 42', 88'; Munro 67'	Attendance: 2,093; Referee: Richmond

12 April 2010 Scottish First Division	Airdrie United	0–1	Queen of the South	Excelsior Stadium
		SFL Report	Mclaren 88'	Attendance: 825; Referee: Somers

17 April 2010 Scottish First Division	Queen of the South	3–0	Raith Rovers	Palmerston Park
	Holmes 22'; Burns 25'; McLaren 80'	BBC Report		Attendance: 1,827; Referee: Salmond

20 April 2010 Scottish First Division	Queen of the South	1–0	Ross County	Palmerston Park
	McLaren 54'	BBC Report		Attendance: 1,183; Referee: O'Reilly

24 April 2010 Scottish First Division	Queen of the South	2–2	Airdrie United	Palmerston Park
	Homes 33'; Weatherston 92'	SFL Report	Gemmill 43'; Waddell 50'	Attendance: 2,541; Referee: Madden

28 April 2010 Scottish First Division	Raith Rovers	0–0	Queen of the South	Stark's Park
		BBC Report		Attendance: 1,030; Referee: Finnie

1 May 2010 Scottish First Division	Partick Thistle	1–0	Queen of the South	Firhill Stadium
	Doolan 93'	ESPN Report		Attendance: 2,912; Referee: Robertson

=== Scottish Challenge Cup ===
25 July 2009 Scottish Challenge Cup round 1	Queen of the South	1–0	Livingston	Palmerston Park
	Wilson 9'	BBC Report		Attendance: 1,558; Referee: Innes

18 August 2009 Scottish Challenge Cup round 2	Dunfermline Athletic	1–2	Queen of the South	East End Park
	Cardle 53'	BBC Report	Kean 12'; Tosh 90'	Attendance: 941; Referee: Allan

6 September 2009 Scottish Challenge Cup round 3	Ross County	2–0	Queen of the South	Victoria Park
	di Giacomo 26'; Craig 90'	BBC Report		Attendance: 964; Referee: Tumilty

=== Scottish League Cup ===
1 August 2009 Scottish League Cup round 1	Queen's Park	1–4	Queen of the South	Hampden Park
	Douglas 82'	BBC Report	Quinn 1'; Wilson 10' 14'; Burns 70'	Attendance: 886; Referee: Charleston

25 August 2009 Scottish League Cup round 2	Partick Thistle	1–2	Queen of the South	Firhill Stadium
	Donnelly 30'	BBC Report	Weatherston 64', 90'	Attendance: 1,527; Referee: Salmond

23 September 2009 Scottish League Cup round 3	Queen of the South	1–2	Rangers	Palmerston Park
	Harris 90+1'	BBC Report	Naismith 16'; Novo 79'	Attendance: 6,120; Referee: Collum

=== Scottish Cup ===
28 November 2009 Scottish Cup round 3	Airdrie United	4–0	Queen of the South	Excelsior Stadium
15:00	Trouten 11' (\39); Baird 23'; O'Carroll 65'	BBC Sport		Attendance: 1,141; Referee: Norris

== Player statistics ==
=== Squad ===
No.	Pos	Nat	Player	Total		First Division		Challenge Cup		League Cup		Scottish Cup	
No.	Pos	Nat	Player	Apps	Goals	Apps	Goals	Apps	Goals	Apps	Goals	Apps	Goals
	GK	(Scotland) SCO	Scott Fox	6	0	5+1	0	0+0	0	0+0	0	0+0	0
	GK	(Scotland) SCO	David Hutton	31	0	27+1	0	1+0	0	1+0	0	1+0	0
	GK	(France) FRA	Ludovic Roy	8	0	4+0	0	2+0	0	2+0	0	0+0	0
	DF	(Trinidad and Tobago) TRI	Marvin Andrews	6	0	5+1	0	0+0	0	0+0	0	0+0	0
	DF	(Scotland) SCO	Craig Barr	1	0	0+0	0	1+0	0	0+0	0	0+0	0
	DF	(Scotland) SCO	Bob Harris	37	5	32+0	4	2+0	0	2+0	1	0+1	0
	DF	(Scotland) SCO	David Lilley	37	1	30+0	1	3+0	0	3+0	0	1+0	0
	DF	(Scotland) SCO	Marc McAusland	32	0	21+4	0	3+0	0	3+0	0	1+0	0
	DF	(Scotland) SCO	Jordan McMillan	16	0	16+0	0	0+0	0	0+0	0	0+0	0
	DF	(Scotland) SCO	Gerry McLauchlan	10	0	4+2	0	0+1	0	0+2	0	1+0	0
	DF	(Scotland) SCO	Jamie McQuilken	10	0	1+5	0	0+1	0	1+1	0	1+0	0
	DF	(Scotland) SCO	Craig Reid	38	0	32+0	0	3+0	0	3+0	0	0+0	0
	MF	(Scotland) SCO	Jamie Adams	7	0	7+0	0	0+0	0	0+0	0	0+0	0
	MF	(Scotland) SCO	Paul Burns	42	7	35+0	6	3+0	0	3+0	1	1+0	0
	MF	(Scotland) SCO	Joe Hamill	11	0	5+6	0	0+0	0	0+0	0	0+0	0
	MF	(Scotland) SCO	Stephen McKenna	33	1	27+1	1	2+0	0	2+0	0	1+0	0
	MF	(Scotland) SCO	Anthony McParland	4	0	0+4	0	0+0	0	0+0	0	0+0	0
	MF	(Scotland) SCO	Rocco Quinn	37	5	29+2	4	1+1	0	1+2	1	1+0	0
	MF	(Scotland) SCO	Neil Scally	11	0	9+1	0	1+0	0	0+0	0	0+0	0
	MF	(Scotland) SCO	Steve Tosh	11	2	3+2	1	2+1	1	3+0	0	0+0	0
	MF	(Scotland) SCO	Barry Wilson	18	4	5+7	1	2+0	1	3+0	2	0+1	0
	FW	(Scotland) SCO	Derek Holmes	43	12	35+1	12	3+0	0	3+0	0	1+0	0
	FW	(Scotland) SCO	Stewart Kean	35	8	14+15	7	1+2	1	1+1	0	1+0	0
	FW	(Scotland) SCO	Leon Knight	6	0	3+3	0	0+0	0	0+0	0	0+0	0
	FW	(Scotland) SCO	Willie McLaren	40	6	28+6	6	1+2	0	0+2	0	1+0	0
	FW	(England) ENG	Sean O'Connor	11	0	4+7	0	0+0	0	0+0	0	0+0	0
	FW	(Scotland) SCO	David Weatherston	37	10	12+18	8	2+1	0	2+1	2	0+1	0
	FW	(Scotland) SCO	Dennis Wyness	7	2	3+4	2	0+0	0	0+0	0	0+0	0

== League table ==
Pos	Team	Pld	W	D	L	GF	GA	GD	Pts
2	Dundee	36	16	13	7	48	34	+14	61
3	Dunfermline Athletic	36	17	7	12	54	44	+10	58
4	Queen of the South	36	15	11	10	53	40	+13	56
5	Ross County	36	15	11	10	46	44	+2	56
6	Partick Thistle	36	14	6	16	43	40	+3	48

Source: Scottish Football League
Rules for classification: 1) points; 2) goal difference; 3) number of goals scored.
First Division play-offs: The 9th place team will be entered into a play-off with the 2nd, 3rd and 4th places of the Second Division. The winner gets a place in the 2010-11 First Division

== See also ==
- List of Queen of the South F.C. seasons
