= 2008–09 Scottish League Cup =

2008–09 Co-operative Insurance Cup
Tournament details
- Country: Scotland
- Dates: 5 August 2008 – 15 March 2009
- Teams: 42

Final positions
- Champions: Celtic
- Runners-up: Rangers

Tournament statistics
- Matches played: 41
- Goals scored: 135 (3.29 per match)

The 2008–09 Scottish League Cup was the 63rd season of the Scotland's second most prestigious football knockout competition, also known for sponsorship reasons as the Co-operative Insurance Cup. Celtic won the cup beating Rangers 2–0 after extra time thanks to a goal from Darren O'Dea and an Aiden McGeady penalty.

== Calendar ==
Round	First match date	Fixtures	Clubs
First round	5 August 2008	14	42 → 28
Second round	26 August 2008	12	28 → 16
Third round	23 September 2008	8	16 → 8
Quarter-finals	28 October 2008	4	8 → 4
Semi-finals	27 January 2009	2	4 → 2
Final	15 March 2009	1	2 → 1

== First round ==
The First round draw was conducted at Hampden Park on 2008-07-22.

2008-08-05	Montrose	0–2	Cowdenbeath	Links Park, Montrose
19:45		Report	McGregor 6'; Fairbairn 81'	Attendance: 382; Referee: A Muir

2008-08-05	Ross County	2–3 (a.e.t.)	Airdrie United	Victoria Park, Dingwall
19:45	Dall 43'; Hart 76'	Report	di Giacomo 23', 112'; Noble 86'	Attendance: 869; Referee: C Allan

2008-08-05	Dumbarton	1–1 (a.e.t.) (5–4 p)	Annan Athletic	Strathclyde Homes Stadium, Dumbarton
19:30	Logan 115'; Geggan (yellow card) 103' (yellow-red card) 104'; Penalty Shootout; Clark (penalty scored); Logan (penalty scored); Tiernan (penalty scored); O'Byrne (penalty scored); Murray (penalty scored)	Report	Jack 103' (pen.) Penalty Shootout; Jardine (penalty scored); Johnstone (penalty scored); Parker (penalty scored); Adamson (penalty scored); Inglis (penalty missed)	Attendance: 462; Referee: G Hilland

2008-08-05	Peterhead	0–2	Dunfermline Athletic	Balmoor Stadium, Peterhead
19:45		Report	Phinn 46'; Kirk 50'	Attendance: 1,291; Referee: G Salmond

2008-08-05	Stranraer	3–6	Greenock Morton	Stair Park, Stranraer
19:45	Frizzel 37'; McColm 72'; Gibson 84'	Report	McGuffie 5'; Wake 12', 85'; Russell 23', 32'; Paartalu 40'	Attendance: 317; Referee: S Finnie

2008-08-05	Alloa Athletic	2–0	Elgin City	Recreation Park, Alloa
19:45	Scott 71'; Kelly 78'	Report		Attendance: 269; Referee: C Brown

2008-08-05	Clyde	4–1	Queen's Park	Broadwood Stadium, Cumbernauld
19:45	Roddy MacLennan 15'; Gibson 63'; McSwegan 86', 88'	Report	Harkins 82'	Attendance: 690; Referee: Stuart Dougal

2008-08-05	Albion Rovers	0–0 (a.e.t.) (3–4 p)	Raith Rovers	Cliftonhill Stadium, Coatbridge
19:45		Report	Davidson (yellow card) 50' (yellow-red card) 78'	Attendance: 415; Referee: S Nicholls

2008-08-05	Partick Thistle	4–3 (a.e.t.)	Forfar Athletic	Firhill Stadium, Glasgow
19:30	McKeown 39'; Gray 70', 97'; Chaplain 112'	Report	Fotheringham 13'; Lilley 65'; Smith 103'	Attendance: 1,192; Referee: E Smith

2008-08-05	Stenhousemuir	1–5	St Johnstone	Ochilview Park, Stenhousemuir
19:30	Love 12'	Report	Sheerin 23' (pen.); Milne 78'; Holmes 79', 83'; Hardie 88'	Attendance: 687; Referee: C Boyle

2008-08-06	Ayr United	2–1	Berwick Rangers	Somerset Park, Ayr
19:45	Aitken 40'; Williams 45'	Report	Greenhill 12'	Attendance: 745; Referee: S. Conroy

2008-08-06	East Fife	0–3	Brechin City	Bayview Stadium, Methil
19:45		Report	Twigg 44'; White 65'; Ward 74'	Attendance: 523; Referee: B. Winter

2008-08-06	Arbroath	3–2	Stirling Albion	Gayfield Park, Arbroath
19:45	McMullan 48'; Wright 64'; Bishop 80'	Report	A. Graham 5'; Harty 63'	Attendance: 448; Referee: J. McKendrick

2008-08-06	East Stirlingshire	1–2 (a.e.t.)	Livingston	Ochilview Park, Stenhousemuir
19:30	B. Graham 90'	Report	Fox 80'; G. Smith 113'	Attendance: 360; Referee: C.Charleston

Source: Scottish Football League

== Second round ==
The second round draw was conducted at The Signet Library, Edinburgh on 2008-08-11.

26 August 2008	St Mirren	7–0	Dumbarton	St Mirren Park, Paisley
19:45	Robb 18'; Mehmet 33', 50', 52'; Dorman 39'; Dargo 75'; Mason 77'	Report		Attendance: 1,747; Referee: Steve O'Reilly

26 August 2008	Livingston	2–1 (a.e.t.)	St Johnstone	Almondvale Stadium, Livingston
19:45	Griffiths 58'; Cuenca 95'	Report	Craig 46'	Attendance: 979; Referee: Steven Nicholls

26 August 2008	Dundee	1–2	Partick Thistle	Dens Park, Dundee
19:45	McHale 80'	Report	Maxwell 78'; Harkins 87' (pen.)	Attendance: 2,507; Referee: Willie Collum

26 August 2008	Hibernian	3–4 (a.e.t.)	Greenock Morton	Easter Road, Edinburgh
19:45	Keenan 80'; Shiels 84'; Pinau 91'	Report	Russell 29', 115' (pen.); Masterton 66'; Harding 118'	Attendance: 14,874; Referee: Iain Brines

26 August 2008	Hamilton Academical	3–1	Clyde	New Douglas Park, Hamilton
19:45	Grady 17'; Thomas 81'; Stevenson 90' (pen.)	Report	Clarke 19'; Ohnesorge (yellow card) 66' (red card)	Attendance: 1,146; Referee: David Somers

26 August 2008	Cowdenbeath	1–5	Dundee United	Central Park, Cowdenbeath
19:45	Dempster 74'	Report	Daly 30', 47', 80'; Goodwillie 41', 60'	Attendance: 1,423; Referee: Euan Norris

26 August 2008	Raith Rovers	1–3	Falkirk	Stark's Park, Kirkcaldy
19:45	Walker (red card) 58'; Campbell 74'	Report	Higdon 16'; J. Stewart 35' (pen.); M. Stewart 84'	Attendance: 2,090; Referee: Craig Thomson

26 August 2008	Dunfermline Athletic	1–0	Alloa Athletic	East End Park, Dunfermline
19:45	Kirk 8'	Report	McKeown (red card) 84'	Attendance: 1,326; Referee: S McLean

27 August 2008	Arbroath	2–2 (a.e.t.) (2–4 p)	Inverness Caledonian Thistle	Gayfield Park, Arbroath
19:45	Tosh 21'; Sellars 87' (pen.)	Report	Vigurs 18'; Wood 64'; Barrowman (yellow card) 120' (red card)	Attendance: 596; Referee: A Muir

27 August 2008	Ayr United	0–1	Aberdeen	Somerset Park, Ayr
19:45		Report	Maguire 40'	Attendance: 2,979; Referee: Brian Winter

27 August 2008	Brechin City	0–2	Kilmarnock	Glebe Park, Brechin
19:45		Report	Wright 58'; Bryson 65'	Attendance: 802; Referee: Steve Conroy

27 August 2008	Heart of Midlothian	0–0 (a.e.t.) (3–4 p)	Airdrie United	Tynecastle Stadium, Edinburgh
19:45		Report	McDonald (yellow card) 107' (red card)	Attendance: 6,844; Referee: Eddie Smith

Source: Scottish Football League

== Third round ==
The Third round draw was conducted at Hampden Park, Glasgow on 2008-09-01.

23 September	Celtic	4–0	Livingston	Celtic Park, Glasgow
19:45	Loovens 24'; Samaras 64', 85' (pen.); Scott Brown 81'	Report		Attendance: 23,569; Referee: W Collum

23 September	Dundee United	2–0	Airdrie United	Tannadice Park, Dundee
19:45	Goodwillie 33'; Robertson 42'	Report		Attendance: 3,444; Referee: M Tumilty

23 September	Dunfermline Athletic	2–0	St Mirren	East End Park, Dunfermline
19:45	Bayne 69'; Wiles 74'	Report		Attendance: 2,186; Referee: C Murray

23 September	Falkirk	2–1	Queen of the South	Falkirk Stadium, Falkirk
19:45	McCann 29'; Lovell 73'	Report	Kean 58'	Attendance: 2,058; Referee: E Smith

23 September	Greenock Morton	1 – 2 (a.e.t.)	Inverness Caledonian Thistle	Cappielow, Greenock
19:45	McAlister 34'	Report	Hastings 79'; Imrie 111'	Attendance: 2,023; Referee: M McCurry

24 September	Kilmarnock	4–2	Aberdeen	Rugby Park, Kilmarnock
19:45	Sammon 2', 33'; Fernandez 12'; Taouil 17' (pen.)	Report	McDonald 6'; Miller 26' (pen.)	Attendance: 4,339; Referee: D McDonald

24 September	Motherwell	1–2 (a.e.t.)	Hamilton Academical	Fir Park, Motherwell
19:45	Murphy 66'; Porter (red card) 45'	Report	Graham 53'; Ettien 95'; Mensing (red card) 112'	Attendance: 5,590; Referee: I Brines

24 September	Partick Thistle	1–2 (a.e.t.)	Rangers	Firhill Stadium, Glasgow
19:45	McKeown 33'	Report	Boyd 25'; Mendes 116'	Attendance: 6,497; Referee: S Conroy

Source: Scottish Football League

== Quarter-finals ==
The quarter-final draw was conducted at Hampden Park, Glasgow on 25 September 2008.

28 October 2008
19:45

Dundee United	1–0	Dunfermline Athletic
S Robertson 16'	Report

Tannadice Park, Dundee
Attendance: 5,350
Referee: D McDonald

28 October 2008
19:45

Falkirk	1–0	Inverness Caledonian Thistle
McCann 36'	Report

Falkirk Stadium, Falkirk
Attendance: 3,007
Referee: S Conroy

28 October 2008
19:45

Rangers	2–0	Hamilton Academical
Boyd 24'; Lafferty 50'	Report

Ibrox Stadium, Glasgow
Attendance: 32,083
Referee: E Smith

29 October 2008
19:45

Kilmarnock	1–3	Celtic
Invincibile 69'	Report	McDonald 11'; Nakamura 45'; McGeady 72'

Rugby Park, Kilmarnock
Attendance: 6,319
Referee: C Thomson

== Semi-finals ==
The semi-final draw was conducted at the Scottish Parliament, Edinburgh on 12 November 2008 by First Minister Alex Salmond, a representative of sponsors Co-operative Insurance and the Presiding Officer of the Parliament, Alex Fergusson.

27 January 2009
19:45

Rangers	3–0	Falkirk
Novo 8', 40'; Boyd 88'	Report

Hampden Park, Glasgow
Attendance: 24,507
Referee: C Richmond

28 January 2009
19:45

Celtic	0–0 (a.e.t.)	Dundee United
	Report
Penalties
McDonald (penalty scored); Caldwell (penalty scored); Nakamura (penalty scored); Robson (penalty scored); Samaras (penalty scored); Naylor (penalty scored); Crosas (penalty scored); Brown (penalty scored); Loovens (penalty missed); Hinkel (penalty scored); Boruc (penalty scored); McDonald (penalty scored)	11–10 Dundee United went first	(penalty scored) Flood; (penalty scored) Daly; (penalty scored) Feeney; (penalty scored) Conway; (penalty scored) Dixon; (penalty scored) Gomis; (penalty scored) Kenneth; (penalty scored) Robertson; (penalty missed) Wilkie; (penalty scored) Kovačević; (penalty scored) Załuska; (penalty missed) Flood

Hampden Park, Glasgow
Attendance: 19,258
Referee: C Murray

== Final ==
15 March 2009
15:00

Celtic	2–0 (a.e.t.)	Rangers
O'Dea 91'; McGeady 120' (pen.)	Report

Hampden Park, Glasgow
Attendance: 51,193
Referee: D McDonald

== Awards ==
A team, player and young player were chosen by the Scottish sports press as the top performers in each round.

Round	Team	Player	Young player	Ref
R1	Greenock Morton			
R2	Greenock Morton	Stephen Robertson (Airdrie United)	Leigh Griffiths (Livingston)	
R3	Dunfermline Athletic	Conor Sammon (Kilmarnock)	David Goodwillie (Dundee United)	
QF		Scott Robertson (Dundee United)	Scott Arfield (Falkirk)	

== Media coverage ==
In Australia the Scottish League Cup was available on SBS and Setanta Sports who also broadcast it in Ireland. In the UK the Scottish League Cup was broadcast on BBC Scotland and BBC Red Button.
