= 2008–09 Clyde F.C. season =

Clyde
2008–09 season
- Chairman: Ian Letham
- Manager: John Brown
- Scottish First Division: 10th
- Scottish Cup: Fourth round
- League Cup: Second round
- Challenge Cup: Third round
- Top goalscorer: League: Pat Clarke (11); All: Pat Clarke (14)
- Highest home attendance: 2,091 vs Partick Thistle (13 September 2008)
- Lowest home attendance: 677 vs Montrose (29 November 2008)
Home colours	Away colours	Third colours

Season 2008–09 saw Clyde compete in their ninth consecutive season in the Scottish First Division. They finished bottom of the league, and were relegated to the Scottish Second Division.

== Transfers ==
=== Summer ===
==== In ====
Player	From	Fee	Date
(Scotland) Stuart Kettlewell	Queens Park	Free	19 May 2008
(Scotland) Marc McCusker	Hearts	Free	1 June 2008
(Scotland) Alan Trouten	Queens Park	Free	2 June 2008
(Scotland) Ricky Waddell	Airdrie United	Free	2 June 2008
(Scotland) Willie McLaren	Unattached	Free	2 June 2008
(Scotland) Mark Brown	Eddlewood Amateurs	Free	4 June 2008
(Scotland) Sean Connolly	Hamilton Academical Youth	Free	1 July 2008
(Scotland) Charles McCole	Clyde Youth	Free	1 July 2008
(Scotland) Gerry McLaughlin	Clyde Youth	Free	1 July 2008
(Germany) Michael Ohnesorge	SV Elversberg	Free	22 July 2008
(Scotland) Scott Gemmill	Berwick Rangers	Free	25 July 2008
(Scotland) Alan Lowing	Rangers	Loan	30 August 2008
(Scotland) Paul Emslie	Rangers	Loan	30 August 2008
(Scotland) Alan Lithgow	Unattached	Free	29 October 2008

==== Out ====
Player	To	Fee	Date
(Scotland) Iain Campbell	Kilmarnock	Loan Return	10 May 2008
(Scotland) Marc McCusker	Hearts	Loan Return	10 May 2008
(Scotland) Gary Arbuckle	Queen of the South	Free	19 May 2008
(Scotland) Shaun Fagan	East Fife	Free	19 May 2008
(Scotland) Sean McKenna	Camelon Juniors	Free	19 May 2008
(Germany) Jörg Albertz	Retired	Free	31 May 2008
(Scotland) Steven Masterton	Greenock Morton	Free	1 June 2008
(Scotland) Calum McGregor	Kilwinning Rangers	Free	2 June 2008
(Scotland) Michael Doherty	Released	Free	2 June 2008
(Scotland) Paul MacDonald	Vale of Clyde	Free	2 June 2008
(Scotland) Juan Carrio	Glenafton Athletic	Free	2 June 2008
(Scotland) Ryan Craig	Goldenhill	Free	2 June 2008
(Scotland) Martin McGowan	Released	Free	2 June 2008
(Scotland) Kyle Hendry	Blackburn Rovers	Free	2 June 2008
(Scotland) Craig McKeown	Dundee	Free	5 June 2008
(Slovakia) Dušan Bestvina	FC Mistelbach	Free	12 June 2008
(England) Christian Smith	Wrexham	Free	12 June 2008
(Scotland) Jimmy Gibson	East Stirlingshire	Free	25 June 2008
(Northern Ireland) Michael McGowan	Queen of the South	Free	30 June 2008
(Scotland) Kevin Bradley	Montrose	Free	30 June 2008
(Scotland) David McGowan	Arbroath	Loan	17 October 2008
(Scotland) Marc McCusker	Albion Rovers	Loan	13 December 2008
(Scotland) Stephen Connolly	Stenhousemuir	Loan	15 December 2008

=== In ===
Player	From	Fee	Date
(Scotland) Tony Stevenson	Hamilton Academical	Loan	1 January 2009
(Scotland) Craig O'Reilly	East Fife	Free	1 January 2009
(France) Grégory Tadé	Stranraer	Undisclosed	24 January 2009
(Scotland) Robbie Winters	Unattached	Free	31 April 2009

==== Out ====
Player	To	Fee	Date
(Scotland) David McGowan	Arbroath	Loan	1 January 2009
(Germany) Michael Ohnesorge	Released	Free	1 January 2009
(Scotland) Paul Emslie	Rangers	Loan Return	1 January 2009
(Scotland) Stephen Connolly	Stranraer	Loan	24 January 2009
(Scotland) Jordan Murch	Stranraer	Loan	24 January 2009
(Scotland) Alan Lowing	Rangers	Loan Return	31 January 2009
(Scotland) Craig O'Reilly	Montrose	Loan	20 March 2009
(Scotland) Jordan Morton	Hearts	Undisclosed	28 April 2009

== Notable events ==
- May: The club ensure that they will be playing First Division football again after a 3–0 aggregate victory over Airdrie United in the playoff final. Preparations are made for the forthcoming season, with Steven Masterton joining Greenock Morton, Gary Arbuckle, Shaun Fagan and Sean McKenna being released whilst Queen's Park captain Stuart Kettlewell becomes the first summer signing. Keeper Peter Cherrie and winger Dave McKay sign new deals, and youngsters Jordan Murch and Stephen Connolly sign their first professional contracts. Marc McCusker, who was on loan to the club last season, signs a two-year contract following his release from Hearts, whilst Jörg Albertz retires. Jörg Albertz retires.
- June: Marc McCusker, who was on loan to the club last season, signs a two-year contract following his release from Hearts. He is shortly joined for Alan Trouten from Queens Park, Ricky Waddell from Airdrie United and ex St Johnstone winger Willie McLaren. Billy Gibson and Marvyn Wilson sign new contracts, whilst all out of contract YTS players are released, including Michael Doherty, the youngest player to play in a competitive match for the club. Mark Brown, of Eddlewood Amateurs, becomes the latest signing, after having scored the winning goal in the 2008 Scottish Amateur Cup Final. Christian Smith leaves the club, along with Slovak Dušan Bestvina, whose contract has been terminated by mutual consent. Midfield dynamo Jimmy Gibson joins East Stirlingshire.
- July: A 20-man squad, including a German trialist, head to Norfolk for their pre-season tour. A 4–0 victory over Great Yarmouth Town, coupled with 2–1 victories over Norwich City and King's Lynn, see the team leave with a 100% record. The Bully Wee return to Rutherglen, their original heartland, to open Rutherglen Glencairn's new stadium. A late Pat Clarke header earns a 1–1 draw. A near capacity crowd at Broadwood Stadium sees Clyde, with special guest players Arthur Numan and Brian Laudrup, along with former Bully Wee midfielder Jorg Albertz, lose narrowly to Rangers. The 1–0 defeat was the first loss of the pre-season. Just before the start of the season, John Brown bolsters his squad further, with the signings of German defender Michael Ohnesorge from SV Elversberg, and striker Scott Gemmill, joining from Berwick Rangers. The first competitive game of the season sees Clyde defeat Annan Athletic 2–0 in their first match as a Scottish Football League side, with Alan Trouten scoring both goals on his debut. The final friendly match sees an understrength Clyde side surprisingly defeat SPL side Hibernian 3–0, in a match to celebrate the 1958 Scottish Cup Final between the two sides.

== Squad ==
Note: Flags indicate national team as defined under FIFA eligibility rules; some limited exceptions apply. Players may hold more than one non-FIFA nationality.

No.	Pos.	Nation	Player
—	GK	SCO	Peter Cherrie
—	GK	SCO	David Hutton
—	GK	SCO	Paul McKendry
—	GK	SCO	Gerry McLaughlin
—	DF	SCO	Mark Brown
—	DF	SCO	Billy Gibson
—	DF	SCO	Chris Higgins
—	DF	SCO	Alan Lithgow
—	DF	SCO	Alan Lowing (on loan from Rangers)
—	DF	SCO	Neil McGregor
—	DF	GER	Michael Ohnesorge
—	DF	SCO	Tony Stevenson (on loan from Hamilton Academical)
—	MF	SCO	Stephen Connolly
—	MF	SCO	Paul Emslie (on loan from Rangers)
—	MF	SCO	Stuart Kettlewell (Team captain)
—	MF	SCO	Roddy MacLennan
—	MF	SCO	Ruari MacLennan
—	MF	SCO	Charles McCole

No.	Pos.	Nation	Player
—	MF	SCO	David McGowan
—	MF	SCO	Willie McLaren
—	MF	SCO	Jordan Murch
—	MF	SCO	Connor Stevenson
—	MF	FRA	Grégory Tadé
—	MF	SCO	Alan Trouten
—	MF	SCO	Ricky Waddell
—	MF	SCO	Marvyn Wilson (Club captain)
—	FW	SCO	Pat Clarke
—	FW	SCO	Sean Connolly
—	FW	SCO	Scott Gemmill
—	FW	SCO	Steven Howarth
—	FW	SCO	Marc McCusker
—	FW	SCO	Dave McKay
—	FW	SCO	Gary McSwegan
—	FW	SCO	Jordan Morton
—	FW	SCO	Craig O'Reilly
—	FW	SCO	Robbie Winters

== Fixtures and results ==
Win Draw Loss Upcoming fixture

=== Friendlies ===
Date	Opponents	Stadium	Result F – A	Scorers	Attendance
5 July 2008	Stirling Albion	Little Kerse	2–0	McLaren, Kettlewell pen'	0
9 July 2008	Airdrie United	Little Kerse	1–1	own goal'	0
12 July 2008	Great Yarmouth Town	Wellesley Recreation Ground	4–0	Trouten 57', Roddy MacLennan 62' 83', Lee 78' (own goal)	284
14 July 2008	Norwich City	Colney Training Centre	2–1	McSwegan, Ohnesorge (Trialist)	0
15 July 2008	King's Lynn	The Walks Stadium	2–1	Kettlewell 27', McKay 87'	480
19 July 2008	Rutherglen Glencairn	New Southcroft Park	1–1	Clarke 85'	600
22 July 2008	Rangers	Broadwood Stadium	0–1		7,653
30 July 2008	Hibernian	Broadwood Stadium	3–0	McKay 20' 52', Roddy MacLennan 42'	934

=== Scottish First Division ===
Date	Opponents	Stadium	Result F – A	Scorers	Attendance	Position	Notes
2 August 2008	Greenock Morton	Broadwood Stadium	1–1	Brown 90+4'	1,638	4th
9 August 2008	Dundee	Dens Park	0–1		4,042	7th
16 August 2008	Ross County	Broadwood Stadium	2–2	Ruari MacLennan 68', Clarke 82'	966	8th
23 August 2008	Livingston	Almondvale Stadium	1–2	Clarke 29'	1,725	8th
30 August 2008	St Johnstone	McDiarmid Park	3–2	McKay 2', Gemmill 37', Waddell 81'	2,412	7th
13 September 2008	Partick Thistle	Broadwood Stadium	1–1	Clarke 69' (pen.)	2,091	8th
20 September 2008	Airdrie United	Excelsior Stadium	2–0	Waddell 27', Ruari MacLennan 59'	1,489	7th
27 September 2008	Queen of the South	Broadwood Stadium	0–2		1,096	8th
4 October 2008	Dunfermline Athletic	Broadwood Stadium	0–2		1,273	9th
18 October 2008	Greenock Morton	Cappielow	0–1		2,041	9th
25 October 2008	Livingston	Broadwood Stadium	2–1	Trouten 63', McSwegan 90'	820	8th
1 November 2008	Ross County	Victoria Park	0–3		2,205	9th
8 November 2008	Partick Thistle	Firhill Stadium	0–2		3,003	10th
15 November 2008	St Johnstone	Broadwood Stadium	2–2	Clarke 17', 85'	1,603	10th
22 November 2008	Queen of the South	Palmerston Park	2–0	Clarke 55', 83'	2,324	9th
13 December 2008	Dundee	Broadwood Stadium	1–0	McLaren 66', Gemmill (red card) 68'	1,176	9th
16 December 2008	Airdrie United	Broadwood Stadium	1–0	Ruari MacLennan (red card) 47', Trouten 74'	864	7th
20 December 2008	Dunfermline Athletic	East End Park	4–4	Trouten 1', Higgins 50', Clarke 65', 70'	3,279	5th
27 December 2008	St Johnstone	McDiarmid Park	0–1	McSwegan (red card) 90'	3,491	7th
3 January 2009	Partick Thistle	Broadwood Stadium	2–4	Clarke 20', 63' (pen.)	2,016	9th
17 January 2009	Livingston	Almondvale Stadium	1–1	McLaren 41'	1,354	8th
24 January 2009	Ross County	Broadwood Stadium	2–0	McLaren 44', Waddell 66'	776	8th
31 January 2009	Dundee	Dens Park	1–2	McLaren 12'	3,217	9th
22 February 2009	Airdrie United	Excelsior Stadium	0–1	Clarke (red card) 39'	1,189	9th
28 February 2009	Queen of the South	Broadwood Stadium	1–1	Trouten 9' (pen.)	1,142	9th
3 March 2009	Greenock Morton	Broadwood Stadium	2–4	Ruari MacLennan 44', Gemmill 45', Gibson (red card) 61'	1,165	9th
7 March 2009	Partick Thistle	Firhill Stadium	1–0	Maxwell 54' (own goal)	3,579	9th
10 March 2009	St Johnstone	Broadwood Stadium	1–3	Lithgow 63'	1,093	9th
14 March 2009	Greenock Morton	Cappielow	0–2	Hutton (red card) 68'	2,168	10th
21 March 2009	Dunfermline Athletic	Broadwood Stadium	1–4	Ruari MacLennan 38'	1,109	10th
4 April 2009	Livingston	Broadwood Stadium	0–1	McLaren (red card) 57'	957	10th
11 April 2009	Ross County	Victoria Park	0–0		2,078	10th
18 April 2009	Airdrie United	Broadwood Stadium	3–0	Waddell 5', Ruari MacLennan 61' 74'	1,614	10th
25 April 2009	Queen of the South	Palmerston Park	1–7	McLaren 24'	2,601	10th
2 May 2009	Dundee	Broadwood Stadium	2–0	Shinnie 53' (own goal), McLaren 77'	944	10th
9 May 2009	Dunfermline Athletic	East End Park	1–1	Higgins 27'	2,418	10th

=== Scottish Challenge Cup ===
Date	Round	Opponents	Stadium	Result F – A	Scorers	Attendance	Notes
26 July 2008	Round 1	Annan Athletic	Broadwood Stadium	2–0	Trouten 61' (pen.) 74'	688
12 August 2008	Round 2	Alloa Athletic	Recreation Park	2–0	Clarke 58', Gibson 76'	414
7 September 2008	Quarter Final	Ross County	Broadwood Stadium	0–1	McGregor (red card) 44'	756

=== Scottish League Cup ===
Date	Round	Opponents	Stadium	Result F – A	Scorers	Attendance	Notes
5 August 2008	Round 1	Queen's Park	Broadwood Stadium	4–1	Roddy MacLennan 15', Gibson 63', McSwegan 86' 88'	690
26 August 2008	Round 2	Hamilton Academical	New Douglas Park	1–3	Clarke 19', Ohnesorge (red card) 66'	1,146

=== Scottish Cup ===
Date	Round	Opponents	Stadium	Result F – A	Scorers	Attendance	Notes
29 November 2008	Round 3	Montrose	Broadwood Stadium	2–0	McKay 38', Clarke 87' (pen.)	677
10 January 2009	Round 4	Dunfermline Athletic	East End Park	0–2		2,871

=== Reserve Fixtures ===
==== Reserve League Cup ====
Date	Stage	Opponents	Stadium	Result F – A	Scorers
15 September 2008	Group	Queen's Park	Lesser Hampden	0–2
29 September 2008	Group	Stenhousemuir	Broadwood Stadium	0–1
20 October 2008	Group	Stranraer	Stair Park	7–1	McCusker, Gemmill, Waddell, Trouten, McCole, Sean Connolly
18 November 2008	Group	Airdrie United	Broadwood Stadium	1–2	McGowan
24 November 2008	Group	Queens Park	Broadwood Stadium	3–1	McSwegan, McGowan, Roddy MacLennan
9 December 2008	Group	Stenhousemuir	Ochilview Park	3–1	Ruari MacLennan, Trouten, Gemmill
12 January 2009	Group	Stranraer	Broadwood Stadium	1–1	Walker
19 January 2009	Group	Partick Thistle	Petershill Park	1–0	O'Reilly
27 January 2009	Group	Airdrie United	Broadwood Stadium	3–2	Tadé, McKay, Gemmill
17 March 2009	Group	Partick Thistle	Broadwood Stadium	2–0	McSwegan, McKay
4 May 2009	Semi Final	Ross County	Victoria Park	0–3

==== Friendlies ====
Date	Opponents	Stadium	Result F – A	Scorers
12 November 2008	Partick Thistle	Lesser Hampden	1–1	McSwegan

== Player statistics ==
=== Overall ===
#	Player	P	Goal	Booked	Sent off (straight red)
GK	(Scotland) David Hutton	34	0	5	1
DF	(Scotland) Neil McGregor	9	0	4	1
DF	(Scotland) Billy Gibson	37	2	5	1
DF	(Scotland) Chris Higgins	37 (2)	2	10	0
DF	(Scotland) Mark Brown	29 (2)	1	4	0
MF	(Scotland) Roddy MacLennan	4 (2)	1	0	0
MF	(Scotland) Alan Trouten	18 (16)	6	5	0
MF	(Scotland) Stuart Kettlewell	32 (1)	0	6	0
FW	(Scotland) Pat Clarke	34 (1)	14	6	1
FW	(Scotland) Gary McSwegan	3 (19)	3	3	1
FW	(Scotland) Dave McKay	19 (19)	2	4	0
FW	(Scotland) Scott Gemmill	26 (9)	2	6	1
MF	(Scotland) Willie McLaren	26 (2)	6	8	1
MF	(Scotland) Stephen Connolly	0 (1)	0	0	0
MF	(Scotland) Ruari MacLennan	20 (16)	6	7	1
MF	(Scotland) Marvyn Wilson	18 (5)	0	8	0
GK	(Scotland) Peter Cherrie	9 (1)	0	1	0
MF	(Scotland) Ricky Waddell	27 (4)	4	8	0
MF	(Scotland) David McGowan	0 (2)	0	0	0
FW	(Scotland) Marc McCusker	0 (1)	0	0	0
MF	(Scotland) Jordan Murch	0 (1)	0	0	0
DF	(Scotland) Alan Lithgow	24	1	4	0
DF	(Scotland) Tony Stevenson	9	0	0	0
FW	(Scotland) Craig O'Reilly	0 (3)	0	0	0
MF	(France) Grégory Tadé	11 (2)	0	2	0
FW	(Scotland) Robbie Winters	4 (2)	0	0	0
MF	(Scotland) Connor Stevenson	0 (2)	0	0	0
GK	(Scotland) Paul McKendry	0	0	0	0
GK	(Scotland) Gerry McLaughlin	0	0	0	0
DF	(Germany) Michael Ohnesorge	13 (1)	0	5	1
MF	(Scotland) Paul Emslie	11	0	6	0
DF	(Scotland) Alan Lowing	19	0	1	0

=== First Division ===
#	Player	P	Goal	Booked	Sent off (straight red)
GK	(Scotland) David Hutton	31	0	5	1
DF	(Scotland) Neil McGregor	7	0	2	0
DF	(Scotland) Chris Higgins	30 (2)	2	10	0
DF	(Scotland) Mark Brown	24 (2)	1	4	0
MF	(Scotland) Stuart Kettlewell	26	0	4	0
DF	(Scotland) Billy Gibson	30	0	5	1
MF	(Scotland) Alan Trouten	15 (12)	4	5	0
FW	(Scotland) Scott Gemmill	23 (7)	2	5	1
FW	(Scotland) Dave McKay	14 (18)	1	4	0
MF	(Scotland) Willie McLaren	24	6	7	1
FW	(Scotland) Pat Clarke	28 (1)	11	4	1
FW	(Scotland) Gary McSwegan	2 (15)	1	3	1
MF	(Scotland) Ruari MacLennan	16 (14)	6	6	1
MF	(Scotland) Roddy MacLennan	1 (2)	0	0	0
MF	(Scotland) Ricky Waddell	24 (4)	4	8	0
MF	(Scotland) David McGowan	0 (1)	0	0	0
MF	(Scotland) Marvyn Wilson	14 (5)	0	8	0
GK	(Scotland) Peter Cherrie	5 (1)	0	0	0
FW	(Scotland) Marc McCusker	0 (1)	0	0	0
MF	(Scotland) Jordan Murch	0 (1)	0	0	0
DF	(Scotland) Alan Lithgow	22	1	4	0
DF	(Scotland) Tony Stevenson	9	0	0	0
FW	(Scotland) Craig O'Reilly	0 (3)	0	0	0
MF	(France) Grégory Tadé	11 (2)	0	2	0
FW	(Scotland) Robbie Winters	4 (2)	0	0	0
MF	(Scotland) Connor Stevenson	0 (2)	0	0	0
DF	(Germany) Michael Ohnesorge	10	0	3	0
MF	(Scotland) Paul Emslie	9	0	4	0
DF	(Scotland) Alan Lowing	17	0	1	0

=== Challenge Cup ===
#	Player	P	Goal	Booked	Sent off (straight red)
GK	(Scotland) David Hutton	1	0	0	0
DF	(Scotland) Neil McGregor	2	0	2	1
DF	(Scotland) Billy Gibson	3	1	0	0
DF	(Scotland) Chris Higgins	3	0	0	0
DF	(Scotland) Mark Brown	2	0	0	0
MF	(Scotland) Roddy MacLennan	2	0	0	0
MF	(Scotland) Alan Trouten	1 (2)	2	0	0
MF	(Scotland) Stuart Kettlewell	2 (1)	0	0	0
FW	(Scotland) Pat Clarke	2	1	2	0
FW	(Scotland) Gary McSwegan	1 (1)	0	0	0
FW	(Scotland) Dave McKay	3	0	0	0
FW	(Scotland) Scott Gemmill	1 (2)	0	1	0
MF	(Scotland) Willie McLaren	0 (1)	0	0	0
MF	(Scotland) Stephen Connolly	0 (1)	0	0	0
GK	(Scotland) Peter Cherrie	2	0	0	0
DF	(Germany) Michael Ohnesorge	2	0	0	0
MF	(Scotland) Marvyn Wilson	1	0	0	0
MF	(Scotland) Ruari MacLennan	1 (1)	0	1	0
MF	(Scotland) Ricky Waddell	2	0	0	0
DF	(Scotland) Alan Lowing	1	0	0	0
MF	(Scotland) Paul Emslie	1	0	1	0

=== League Cup ===
#	Player	P	Goal	Booked	Sent off (straight red)
GK	(Scotland) Peter Cherrie	2	0	1	0
DF	(Scotland) Billy Gibson	2	1	0	0
MF	(Scotland) Ruari MacLennan	2	0	0	0
DF	(Scotland) Chris Higgins	2	0	0	0
DF	(Scotland) Mark Brown	2	0	0	0
MF	(Scotland) Stuart Kettlewell	2	0	1	0
MF	(Scotland) Alan Trouten	1 (1)	0	0	0
MF	(Scotland) Marvyn Wilson	2	0	0	0
FW	(Scotland) Scott Gemmill	2	0	0	0
FW	(Scotland) Pat Clarke	2	1	0	0
MF	(Scotland) Roddy MacLennan	1	1	0	0
MF	(Scotland) Willie McLaren	0 (1)	0	0	0
DF	(Germany) Michael Ohnesorge	1 (1)	0	2	1
FW	(Scotland) Gary McSwegan	0 (1)	2	0	0
MF	(Scotland) Ricky Waddell	1	0	0	0
FW	(Scotland) Dave McKay	0 (1)	0	0	0
MF	(Scotland) David McGowan	0 (1)	0	0	0

=== Scottish Cup ===
#	Player	P	Goal	Booked	Sent off (straight red)
GK	(Scotland) David Hutton	2	0	0	0
DF	(Scotland) Alan Lowing	1	0	0	0
DF	(Scotland) Mark Brown	1	0	0	0
DF	(Scotland) Chris Higgins	2	0	0	0
DF	(Scotland) Billy Gibson	2	0	0	0
DF	(Scotland) Alan Lithgow	2	0	0	0
FW	(Scotland) Dave McKay	2	1	0	0
MF	(Scotland) Stuart Kettlewell	2	0	1	0
FW	(Scotland) Pat Clarke	2	1	0	0
MF	(Scotland) Paul Emslie	1	0	1	0
MF	(Scotland) Willie McLaren	2	0	1	0
MF	(Scotland) Ruari MacLennan	1 (1)	0	0	0
FW	(Scotland) Gary McSwegan	0 (2)	0	0	0
MF	(Scotland) Alan Trouten	1 (1)	0	0	0
MF	(Scotland) Marvyn Wilson	1	0	0	0

- Note: Players in italics have left the club

== League table ==
Pos	Team	Pld	W	D	L	GF	GA	GD	Pts	Promotion, qualification or relegation
6	Greenock Morton	36	12	11	13	40	40	0	47	
7	Livingston (R)	36	13	8	15	56	58	−2	47 (Note: Demoted to 3rd Division for Financial Irregularities)	Relegation to the Third Division
8	Ross County	36	13	8	15	42	46	−4	47	
9	Airdrie United	36	10	12	14	29	43	−14	42 (Note: Spared Relegation as Losing Finalist in the playoff due to Livingston)	Qualification for the First Division Play-offs (Note: The 9th placed team will be entered into a play-off with the Second Division's 2nd, 3rd and 4th placed teams. The winning team will be awarded a place in the 2009–10 First Division.)
10	Clyde (R)	36	10	9	17	41	58	−17	39	Relegation to the Second Division

Source: BBC Sport
Rules for classification: 1) points; 2) goal difference; 3) number of goals scored.
(R) Relegated
