= 2008–09 Hamilton Academical F.C. season =

Hamilton Academical
2008–09 season
- Chairman: Ronnie MacDonald
- Manager: Billy Reid
- Stadium: New Douglas Park
- Scottish Premier League: 9th
- League Cup: Quarter-finals
- Scottish Cup: Quarter-finals
- Top goalscorer: League: James McCarthy; Simon Mensing; Richard Offiong (6); All: James McCarthy; Simon Mensing; Richard Offiong (6)

The 2008–09 season was the 122nd season of competitive football by Hamilton Academical and the first back in the top-flight of Scottish football following their promotion from the Scottish First Division at the end of the 2007–08 season.

== Results and fixtures ==
Win	Draw	Loss

Date	Venue	Opponents	Score	Competition	Hamilton scorer(s)	Match Report
12 July 2008	Glencruitten, Oban	Various (whole tournament was in 1 day)	Various	Keyline Cup	Various	Oban Saints Official Site
16 July 2008	Excelsior Stadium, Airdrie	Airdrie United	0–1	F		
17 July 2008	Shielfield Park, Berwick-upon-Tweed	Berwick Rangers	3–2	F	Grady, Easton, McLeod	
22 July 2008	Cliftonhill, Coatbridge	Albion Rovers	1–1	F	Waterworth	
23 July 2008	Strathclyde Homes Stadium, Dumbarton	Dumbarton	3–1	F	Stevenson, McCarthy, Akins	Dumbarton Official Site
24 July 2008	Bayview Stadium, Methil	East Fife	0–2	F		East Fife Official Site
26 July 2008	The PTS Stadium, Billingham	Billingham Synthonia	3–0	F	Taylor (2), Akins	
26 July 2008	Victoria Park, Hartlepool	Huddersfield Town	2–1	Hartlepool United Centenary Tournament	McArthur, Mensing	Hartlepool United Official Site
27 July 2008	Victoria Park, Hartlepool	Sunderland	2–1	Hartlepool United Centenary Tournament	Own goal, Graham	Hartlepool United Official Site
5 August 2008	Prestonfield, Linlithgow	Linlithgow Rose	3–2	F	Stevenson (pen), McArthur, McLeod	
11 August 2008	New Douglas Park, Hamilton	Dundee United	3–1	SPL	Stevenson, McArthur, Graham	Hamilton Official Site
16 August 2008	Caledonian Stadium, Inverness	Inverness CT	1–0	SPL	Offiong	Hamilton Official Site
20 August 2008	New Douglas Park, Hamilton	Liverpool Reserves	1–2	F	Thomas	Liverpool Official Site
23 August 2008	Rugby Park, Kilmarnock	Kilmarnock	0–1	SPL		Hamilton Official Site
26 August 2008	New Douglas Park, Hamilton	Clyde	3–1	SLC	Grady, Thomas, Stevenson (pen)	Hamilton Official Site
30 August 2008	New Douglas Park, Hamilton	Heart of Midlothian	1–2	SPL	Lyle	Hamilton Official Site
13 September 2008	Pittodrie Stadium, Aberdeen	Aberdeen	2–1	SPL	Graham, McCarthy	Hamilton Official Site
20 September 2008	New Douglas Park, Hamilton	Hibernian	0–1	SPL		Hamilton Official Site
24 September 2008	Fir Park, Motherwell	Motherwell	2–1 (a.e.t.)	SLC	Graham, Ettien	Hamilton Official Site
27 September 2008	Falkirk Stadium, Falkirk	Falkirk	1–4	SPL	Own goal	Hamilton Official Site
4 October 2008	Celtic Park, Glasgow	Celtic	0–4	SPL		Hamilton Official Site
18 October 2008	New Douglas Park, Hamilton	St Mirren	1–2	SPL	Corcoran	Hamilton Official Site
25 October 2008	New Douglas Park, Hamilton	Rangers	1–3	SPL	Easton	Hamilton Official Site
28 October 2008	Ibrox Stadium, Glasgow	Rangers	0–2	SLC		Hamilton Official Site
1 November 2008	Fir Park, Motherwell	Motherwell	0–2	SPL		Hamilton Official Site
8 November 2008	New Douglas Park, Hamilton	Falkirk	1–1	SPL	McCarthy	Hamilton Official Site
12 November 2008	Tynecastle Stadium, Edinburgh	Heart of Midlothian	0–1	SPL		Hamilton Official Site
16 November 2008	New Douglas Park, Hamilton	Celtic	1–2	SPL	Offiong	Hamilton Official Site
22 November 2008	Tannadice Park, Dundee	Dundee United	1–1	SPL	Offiong	Hamilton Official Site
29 November 2008	New Douglas Park, Hamilton	Kilmarnock	1–0	SPL	Offiong	Hamilton Official Site
6 December 2008	Ibrox Stadium, Glasgow	Rangers	1–7	SPL	McArthur	Hamilton Official Site
13 December 2008	Easter Road, Edinburgh	Hibernian	0–2	SPL		Hamilton Official Site
20 December 2008	New Douglas Park, Hamilton	Motherwell	2–0	SPL	McCarthy (2)	Hamilton Official Site
27 December 2008	Love Street, Paisley	St Mirren	0–1	SPL		Hamilton Official Site
3 January 2009	New Douglas Park, Hamilton	Aberdeen	2–0	SPL	Mensing (pen), Offiong	Hamilton Official Site
10 January 2009	Victoria Park, Dingwall	Ross County	1–0	SC	Swailes	Hamilton Official Site
17 January 2009	New Douglas Park, Hamilton	Inverness CT	1–0	SPL	Mensing (pen)	Hamilton Official Site
25 January 2009	Rugby Park, Kilmarnock	Kilmarnock	1–0	SPL	Offiong	Hamilton Official Site
31 January 2009	New Douglas Park, Hamilton	Heart of Midlothian	2–0	SPL	Mensing (2, 1 pen)	Hamilton Official Site
7 February 2009	New Douglas Park, Hamilton	Dundee United	2–1	SC	Swailes (2)	Hamilton Official Site
14 February 2009	Fir Park, Motherwell	Motherwell	0–1	SPL		Hamilton Official Site
21 February 2009	Falkirk Stadium, Falkirk	Falkirk	2–1	SPL	Mensing, McGowan	Hamilton Official Site
28 February 2009	New Douglas Park, Hamilton	Rangers	0–1	SPL		Hamilton Official Site
4 March 2009	New Douglas Park, Hamilton	Hibernian	0–1	SPL		Hamilton Official Site
8 March 2009	Ibrox Stadium, Glasgow	Rangers	1–5	SC	Quinn	Hamilton Official Site
14 March 2009	Pittodrie Stadium, Aberdeen	Aberdeen	0–1	SPL		Hamilton Official Site
21 March 2009	New Douglas Park, Hamilton	St Mirren	0–0	SPL		Hamilton Official Site
4 April 2009	Celtic Park, Glasgow	Celtic	0–4	SPL		Hamilton Official Site
11 April 2009	New Douglas Park, Hamilton	Dundee United	0–1	SPL		Hamilton Official Site
18 April 2009	Caledonian Stadium, Inverness	Inverness CT	1–1	SPL	Gibson	Hamilton Official Site
2 May 2009	New Douglas Park, Hamilton	Kilmarnock	2–1	SPL	McCarthy (2)	Hamilton Official Site
10 May 2009	Caledonian Stadium, Inverness	Inverness CT	1–1	SPL	Canning	Hamilton Official Site
13 May 2009	New Douglas Park, Hamilton	Falkirk	0–1	SPL		Hamilton Official Site
16 May 2009	New Douglas Park, Hamilton	Motherwell	0–3	SPL		Hamilton Official Site
23 May 2009	St Mirren Park, Paisley	St Mirren	1–0	SPL	Mensing	Hamilton Official Site

=== Scottish League Cup ===
The Accies entered the Scottish League Cup at the second round and were again knocked out in the same stage and by the same opponents as the Scottish Cup.

26 August 2008 Second round	Hamilton Academical	3–1	Clyde	New Douglas Park, Hamilton
19:45	Grady 17'; Thomas 81'; Stevenson 90' (pen.)	Report	Clarke 19'; Ohnesorge (yellow card) 1' (yellow-red card) 66'	Attendance: 1,146; Referee: David Somers

24 September Third round	Motherwell	1–2 (a.e.t.)	Hamilton Academical	Fir Park, Motherwell
19:45	Murphy 66'; Porter (red card) 45'	Report	Graham 53'; Ettien 95'; Mensing (yellow card) 45' (yellow-red card) 112'	Attendance: 5,590; Referee: I Brines

28 October 2008 Quarter-finals	Rangers	2–0	Hamilton Academical	Ibrox Stadium, Glasgow
19:45	Boyd 24'; Lafferty 50'	Report		Attendance: 32,083; Referee: E Smith

=== Scottish Cup ===
Hamilton Academical entered the Scottish Cup at the fourth round where they faced Ross County on 10 January 2009. After a 1–0 win courtesy of a goal from defender Chris Swailes, the club progressed to the quarter-finals and were drawn against Rangers at Ibrox. On 8 March 2009, the club were eliminated from the competition by eventual champion Rangers, following to a 5–1 defeat.

10 January 2009 Fourth round	Ross County	0–1	Hamilton Academical	Victoria Park, Dingwall
15:00		Report	Swailes 22'; McArthur (red card) 90'	Attendance: 2,300; Referee: C Allan

8 March 2009 Quarter-finals	Rangers	5–1	Hamilton Academical	Ibrox Stadium, Glasgow
15:00	Whittaker 15'; Lafferty 35', 81'; Ñíguez 45' (pen.); Davis 53'	Report	Quinn 26'	Attendance: 27,588; Referee: I Brines

== Team statistics ==
=== League table ===
Pos	Team	Pld	W	D	L	GF	GA	GD	Pts	Qualification or relegation (Note: Teams played each other three times (33 matches), before the league split into two groups (the top six and the bottom six) for the last five matches.)
7	Motherwell	38	13	9	16	46	51	−5	48	Qualification for the Europa League first qualifying round (Note: Scotland were awarded an additional Europa League place as the association finished in third place of the UEFA Fair Play ranking. Motherwell earned this place as winners of the Scottish Fair Play ranking.)
8	Kilmarnock	38	12	8	18	38	48	−10	44	
9	Hamilton Academical	38	12	5	21	30	53	−23	41	
10	Falkirk	38	9	11	18	37	52	−15	38	Qualification for the Europa League second qualifying round (Note: Since Rangers, the winners of the Scottish Cup, already qualified for the Champions League via their league position, Falkirk, the losing finalist, earned a spot in the Europa League.)
11	St Mirren	38	9	10	19	33	52	−19	37	

Source: Scottish Professional Football League
Rules for classification: 1) Points; 2) Goal difference; 3) Goals scored
