= Ruari MacLennan =

Scottish footballer

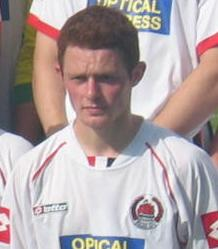

Personal information
- Full name: Ruari MacLennan
- Date of birth: 26 March 1988 (age 38)
- Place of birth: Livingston, Scotland
- Position: Central midfielder

Team information
- Current team: Armadale

Youth career
- BFC Linlithgow
- Gairdoch
- 2004–2005: East Stirlingshire
- 2005–2006: Clyde

Senior career*
Years	Team	Apps	(Gls)
2006–2009	Clyde	72	(10)
2010–2016	Linlithgow Rose		
2016–2017	Bo'ness United		
2017–2021	Linlithgow Rose		
2021-	Armadale		
- * Club domestic league appearances and goals as of 11:40, 27 July 2016 (UTC)

Ruari MacLennan (born 26 March 1988) is a Scottish football midfielder who plays for Armadale. MacLennan is a product of Clyde's youth system.

== Career ==
Born in Livingston, MacLennan signed a YTS contract with Clyde in the summer of 2006, and made his début on the opening day of that season, coming on as a substitute in a 0–0 draw against St Johnstone. He was given a three-year professional contract in June 2007.

MacLennan hit another milestone against St Johnstone the following season, when he scored his first senior goal in a 1–0 victory in August 2007. He notched his second goal for Clyde in the Scottish Challenge Cup, in a defeat at home to Dunfermline Athletic. His other notable goals include the late equalizer against Greenock Morton in the 2–1 away victory in which Clyde scored two injury time goals to seal a very important league victory at Cappielow, and a double in a 3–2 victory over Livingston in April 2008. MacLennan was shown his first senior red card in a Scottish First Division defeat away to Livingston, where he was judged to have committed a professional foul.

He is the older brother of footballer Roddy MacLennan. In a Scottish Cup tie against Montrose in November 2007, the MacLennans became the first brothers to play for Clyde for 17 years. MacLennan's contract was terminated in June 2009, following Clyde's relegation and financial troubles.

On 24 November 2010, MacLennan was given the go ahead to resume playing football after hip surgery and joined his local Junior club, Linlithgow Rose. Alongside his brother Roddy, MacLennan moved on to Bo'ness United in July 2016. However, after just a year return home to Linlithgow in the summer of 2017 along with his brother and Strickland

MacLennan signed for Armadale in 2021.

== Statistics ==
Correct as of 16 January 2009

Club Performance
Club	Season	League		Cup		League Cup		Other		Total
Club	Season	Apps	Goals	Apps	Goals	Apps	Goals	Apps	Goals	Apps	Goals
Clyde	2006–07	9	0	0	0	0	0	0	0	9	0
Clyde	2007–08	33	4	2	0	1	0	6	1	42	5
Clyde	2008–09	16	2	2	0	2	0	2	0	22	2
Clyde	Total	58	6	4	0	3	0	8	1	73	7
Career Totals		58	6	4	0	3	0	8	1	73	7

== See also ==
- Clyde F.C. season 2006-07 | 2007–08 | 2008–09
