= Mark Brown (footballer, born 1984) =

Scottish footballer

Personal information
- Full name: Mark James Brown
- Date of birth: 5 August 1984 (age 42)
- Place of birth: Motherwell, Scotland
- Positions: Defender; midfielder

Senior career*
Years	Team	Apps	(Gls)
2000–2003	Rangers	0	(0)
2006–2008	Eddlewood		
2008–2009	Clyde	26	(1)
2009–2011	Alloa Athletic	30	(0)
- * Club domestic league appearances and goals as of 19:53, 30 June 2010 (UTC)

Mark James Brown (born 5 August 1984) is a Scottish footballer who plays for Alloa Athletic. He can play in defence or as a midfielder.

== Career ==
Brown began his career with Rangers. He was released by the Ibrox outfit after a serious injury to his spine, and gave up football, after thinking he would never play again.

Brown got back into the game with Lanarkshire side Eddlewood Amateurs. Brown was a key player in the side, and it was his spectacular long range strike which won Eddlewood the Scottish Amateur Cup in May 2008.

Brown returned to the senior game in June 2008, when he was given a two-year contract at Clyde. He made his Clyde debut in July 2008, in a 2-0 victory over Annan Athletic in the Scottish Challenge Cup. A week later, he scored an equaliser in the fifth minute of injury time in a 1-1 draw with Greenock Morton, in his league debut. Brown's contract was terminated in June 2009, following Clyde's relegation and financial troubles. He went on to sign for Alloa Athletic.

== Statistics ==
Correct as of 16 January 2009

Club Performance
Club	Season	League		Cup		League Cup		Other		Total
Club	Season	Apps	Goals	Apps	Goals	Apps	Goals	Apps	Goals	Apps	Goals
Clyde	2008-09	15	1	1	0	2	0	2	0	20	1
Clyde	Total	15	1	1	0	2	0	2	0	20	1
Career Totals		15	1	1	0	2	0	2	0	20	1

== See also ==
- Clyde F.C. season 2008-09
