= Dave McKay (footballer) =

Scottish footballer

Personal information
- Full name: David McKay
- Date of birth: 21 November 1984 (age 41)
- Place of birth: Glasgow, Scotland
- Height: 5 ft 11 in (1.80 m)
- Positions: Winger; forward

Senior career*
Years	Team	Apps	(Gls)
- Swinton Amateurs
- Drumchapel United
2008–2009	Clyde	51	(1)
- * Club domestic league appearances and goals as of 22:17, 24 November 2009 (UTC)

David McKay (born 21 November 1984, in Glasgow) is a Scottish football striker currently without a club following his release from Clyde.

== Career ==
McKay started the 2007–08 season playing amateur football, playing for both Drumchapel United and Swinton every weekend. He already had 75 goals to his name during the season before Clyde took an interest in him. He was capped by the Scotland Amateur international team, and was previously working in the A.G. Barr warehouse in Cumbernauld.

McKay signed for Clyde, his first professional club, on 19 February 2008, after impressing in a trial period, in which he scored two goals for the Reserve team.

He made his senior debut in a 2–1 defeat against Dunfermline Athletic on 23 February 2008. He is known for his speed, and can play as a winger as well as a striker. McKay scored all 4 goals in Clyde's Reserve League Cup Final victory over Livingston in May 2008, taking his total in the competition to 9 for the season.

He scored his first competitive goal for Clyde on 30 August 2008 in a 3–2 victory over St Johnstone. McKay's contract was terminated in June 2009, following Clyde's relegation and financial troubles, however, in July 2009, he signed a new one-month contract with the club. He left the club in December 2009.

== Statistics ==
Correct as of 16 January 2009

Club Performance
Club	Season	League		Cup		League Cup		Other		Total
Club	Season	Apps	Goals	Apps	Goals	Apps	Goals	Apps	Goals	Apps	Goals
Clyde	2007-08	12	0	0	0	0	0	4	0	16	0
Clyde	2008-09	19	1	2	1	1	0	3	0	25	2
Clyde	Total	31	1	2	1	1	0	7	0	41	2
Career Totals		31	1	2	1	1	0	7	0	41	2

== See also ==
- 2007–08 Clyde F.C. season | 2008-09
