= Connor Stevenson =

Scottish footballer

Conor Stevenson
Personal information
- Date of birth: 23 August 1992 (age 34)
- Place of birth: Bellshill, Scotland
- Position: Midfielder

Team information
- Current team: Petershill

Senior career*
Years	Team	Apps	(Gls)
2009–2011	Clyde	41	(0)
2011–2012	Vale of Clyde		
2012–2013	Albion Rovers	10	(0)
2013–2016	Vale of Clyde		
2016– 2018	Petershill		
2018– 2019	Cumbernauld United		
- * Club domestic league appearances and goals

Conor Stevenson (born 23 August 1992) is a Scottish football midfielder who plays for Petershill. He has previously played in the Scottish Football League First Division for Clyde.

== Career ==
Stevenson captained the Clyde Under-17 team during the 2008–09 season, and after impressing for the Reserve team, he signed a professional contract with the club in February 2009.

Stevenson scored against Celtic in the Glasgow Cup in April 2009, and was included in the first team squad for the following weekend's fixture against Queen of the South. He made his debut in that game, coming on as a 53rd-minute substitute in a heavy 7–1 defeat. In doing so, he became the youngest player ever to play a competitive game for Clyde, at the age of 16 years and 245 days, beating the previous record held by Michael Doherty.

In October 2009 it was revealed that Stevenson was invited, along with teammate Steve Howarth, to a trial with Rangers. Stevenson finished the season in fine form, and won the Scottish Football League Young Player of the Month award for April 2010. He was released by Clyde in May 2011.

During season 2011–2012, Stevenson played Junior football with Vale of Clyde.

Stevenson then returned to senior football, after one year out, to sign for Scottish Second Division side Albion Rovers before returning to Vale of Clyde the following summer. - Stevenson signs for Petershill fc for season 2016–2017.Stevenson signs for Cumbernauld united season 2018–2019

== See also ==
- Clyde F.C. season 2008-09
