= Anthony McParland =

Scottish footballer

Tony McParland
Personal information
- Full name: Anthony Patrick McParland
- Date of birth: 20 September 1982 (age 44)
- Place of birth: Rutherglen, Scotland
- Positions: Defender; midfielder

Senior career*
Years	Team	Apps	(Gls)
2003–2006	Celtic	0	(0)
2006–2007	Barnsley	8	(0)
2007	→ Wycombe Wanderers (loan)	2	(0)
2007–2008	Wycombe Wanderers	2	(0)
2008–2009	Livingston	40	(3)
2009–2010	Queen of the South	3	(0)
2010–2012	Arthurlie		
2012–2013	Queen's Park	23	(4)
2014–2015	Irvine Meadow		
2015-2020	Kirkintilloch Rob Roy		
2020	Glenafton Athletic		
2020-2022	St Cadoc's		

International career
2002	Scotland U21	1	(0)
- * Club domestic league appearances and goals as of 20:00, 29 July 2014 (UTC)

Anthony Patrick McParland (born 20 September 1982) is a Scottish footballer, who played for Irvine Meadow in the Scottish Junior Football Association, West Region. He has previously played senior league football in England and Scotland.

McParland can play as a defender or as a midfielder, although he started out as a winger. McParland is a former Scotland under 17, 18 and 21 international player.

== Career ==
McParland started his career as a youth player with Celtic from 2003 until 2006, playing as a winger. McParland failed to break into the first team during his time at Celtic Park. In the January 2006 transfer window McParland signed for Barnsley where he made 8 league appearances as a substitute without scoring a goal. In the 2007 January transfer window McParland signed for Wycombe Wanderers, initially on loan, before signing a permanent contract in February 2007. McParland made 4 league appearances for the club without scoring a goal, before being released at the end of the 2007–08 season.

McParland signed for Livingston on a two-year deal at the start of the 2008–09 season. McParland was then released by the club on 20 November 2009, having his contract terminated after he failed to break into the Livingston first team during the 2009–10 season. McParland made 40 league appearances for the Almondvale club and scored 3 goals.

On 12 December 2009 McParland was an unused trialist in a league match at Cappielow against Morton that Queens won 2–1. On 26 December 2009 McParland appeared as a trialist in a league match at Firhill against Partick Thistle that ended in a 2–2 draw. McParland replaced Willie McLaren in the second half after 68 minutes. In the January 2010 transfer window, McParland signed for Queen of the South. McParland's first match as a signed player was on 16 February 2010 at Palmerston in a league match against Ayr United that ended in a 3–0 win for Queens. McParland replaced David Weatherston in the second half after 72 minutes. He also played in two matches against Airdrie United but was released by Queens at the end of the 2009–10 season.

McParland moved to Junior football with Arthurlie after leaving Queen of the South but returned to the SPFL with Queen's Park in 2012. He returned to the Junior game with Irvine Meadow in July 2014.

He went on to have spells at Kirkintilloch Rob Roy, Glenafton Athletic and St Cadoc's before retiring in 2022.
