= Craig O'Reilly =

Scottish footballer

Personal information
- Full name: Craig Michael O'Reilly
- Date of birth: 20 September 1987 (age 39)
- Place of birth: Edinburgh, Scotland
- Position: Striker

Youth career
- –2003: Raith Rovers "D" form U16

Senior career*
Years	Team	Apps	(Gls)
2003–2005	Raith Rovers	11	(1)
2004	→ Montrose (loan)	10	(0)
2005–2007	Dundee	15	(3)
2006–2007	→ East Fife (loan)	31	(13)
2007–2008	East Fife	41	(3)
2009	Clyde	3	(0)
2009	→ Montrose (loan)	8	(3)
2009–2010	Stenhousemuir	10	(0)
2010	Bonnyrigg Rose Athletic		
2010–2011	Berwick Rangers	21	(6)
2012	Penicuik Athletic	11	(3)
2012	Ballingry Rovers		
2012–2014	Newtongrange Star		
2014–2015	Kelty Hearts		
2015–2016	Dalkeith Thistle		
2016–2018	Tynecastle		
2018–2019	Gala Fairydean Rovers		
2020–2021	Newtongrange Star		

International career
2005	Scotland U-19	2	(0)
- * Club domestic league appearances and goals as of 16:00, 24 April 2021 (UTC)

Craig Michael O'Reilly (born 20 September 1987) is a Scottish former footballer.

He has previously played in the Scottish Football League First Division for Raith Rovers, Dundee and Clyde.

== Career ==
O'Reilly began his career with Raith Rovers. He made his senior debut aged 16, scoring a goal in a 1–1 draw with Brechin City in May 2004, securing Raith's First Division future in the process. In August 2004, he joined Montrose on a loan deal until the end of the year.

O'Reilly signed for Dundee in July 2005, and was named Scottish Football League Young Player of the Month for December 2005, after scoring 3 goals in 3 games. He was also called up to the Scotland under-19 squad at this time. He spent the whole of the 2006–07 season on loan at East Fife, and the move was made permanent in May 2007. In a Scottish League Cup tie in August 2007, O'Reilly's wonder goal saw Third Division East Fife defeat Premier League St Mirren 1–0 away from home, in a cup giant killing. O'Reilly left East Fife in December 2008, after finding first team chances limited.

He made the step up to the Scottish First Division in January 2009, signing a six-month contract with Clyde. He made his debut in a 4–2 defeat against Partick Thistle on 3 January. He joined Montrose on loan for the second time in his career, in March 2009, until the end of the season. O'Reilly was released by Clyde in June 2009 along with the rest of the out of contract players, due to the club's financial position. O'Reilly moved on to Stenhousemuir but failed to hold down a starting place. He joined his hometown club Bonnyrigg Rose Athletic in January 2010 while considering a move to America, but returned to the SFL with Berwick Rangers the following summer.

A cruciate ligament injury picked up whilst jogging in March 2011 ended O'Reilly's career at Berwick but he returned to the Junior game with Penicuik Athletic in January 2012. He then had a short spell at Ballingry Rovers before signing for Newtongrange Star in October 2012.

O'Reilly joined Kelty Hearts in June 2014. He later had a spell at hometown club Dalkeith Thistle before moving on to East of Scotland League side Tynecastle in June 2016.

O'Reilly joined Gala Fairdean Rovers in 2018 and returned to Newtongrange Star in 2020,

O'Reilly announced his retirement from football on 17 April 2021.

== See also ==
- 2008–09 Clyde F.C. season
