= Marc McCusker =

Scottish footballer

Personal information
- Full name: Marc James McCusker
- Date of birth: 29 July 1989 (age 37)
- Place of birth: Rutherglen, Scotland
- Position: Striker

Senior career*
Years	Team	Apps	(Gls)
2005–2008	Heart of Midlothian	0	(0)
2007	→ Stranraer (loan)	7	(0)
2008	→ Clyde (loan)	3	(0)
2008–2009	Clyde	1	(0)
2008–2009	→ Albion Rovers (loan)	3	(1)
2009–2010	Albion Rovers	21	(6)
2010–2011	Clyde	21	(11)
2011–2012	Queen of the South	7	(0)
2012–2013	Dumbarton	9	(1)
2013	→ Clyde (loan)	7	(0)
- * Club domestic league appearances and goals as of 24 May 2013

Marc James McCusker (born 29 July 1989) is a Scottish former professional footballer.

== Career ==
McCusker came through the Hearts youth system, and joined the groundstaff in 2005. He joined Stranraer on a three-month loan deal in August 2007. He made eight appearances, getting seven assists, but failed to score a goal.

McCusker then joined Scottish First Division side Clyde on 21 March 2008 on an emergency loan until the end of the season. He made his debut the following day, coming on as a substitute against Queens in a four to one defeat, winning the penalty for Clyde's only goal of the game. After the initial loan spell, he joined Clyde on a permanent deal on 1 June 2008, following his release by mutual consent from Hearts.

He joined Albion Rovers on a one-month loan deal in December 2008. He made three appearances for Rovers, scoring two goals, including the winner in a two to one victory over Berwick Rangers. McCusker's contract was terminated in June 2009, following Clyde's relegation and financial troubles. He subsequently joined Albion Rovers on a permanent contract, and made seventeen starts and a total of 28 appearances during the course of the season, scoring nine goals.

In May 2010, McCusker returned to Broadwood Stadium for the second time, to sign with Clyde, at that time a Third Division side. He scored fifteen goals in 24 games over the season, and left the club in May 2011, after turning down a new contract.

McCusker signed with Dumfries club Queen of the South on 23 July 2011 for the 2011–12 season. He was released at the end of that season following an injury sustained off the field.

Marc became Ian Murray's first signing at Dumbarton on Saturday, 22 December. He scored his first goal for the club against Airdrie in January

On Friday, 22 March 2013 he returned to Clyde on loan until the end of the season.

He made his return as a late substitute in a two to zero win against East Stirlingshire at Broadwood.

== See also ==
- 2007–08 Clyde F.C. season | 2008–09
