= Willie McLaren =

Scottish footballer

Personal information
- Full name: William McLaren
- Date of birth: 6 November 1984 (age 41)
- Place of birth: Glasgow, Scotland
- Position: Forward

Team information
- Current team: Forth Wanderers

Senior career*
Years	Team	Apps	(Gls)
2003–2006	Airdrie United	85	(22)
2006–2008	St Johnstone	33	(3)
2008–2009	Clyde	24	(6)
2009–2011	Queen of the South	60	(15)
2011	Hamilton Academical	13	(0)
2011	→ Airdrie United (loan)	16	(3)
2011–2012	Airdrie United	34	(8)
2012–2013	Airdrieonians	23	(2)
2013-2015	Irvine Meadow	41	(10)
2015-2017	Bo'ness United	29	(3)
2016	→ Kilwinning Rangers (loan)	15	(4)
2017	Forth Wanderers	20	(1)
- * Club domestic league appearances and goals as of 19:36, 16 October 2016 (UTC)

William McLaren (born 6 November 1984) is a Scottish professional footballer who plays for Scottish Junior club Forth Wanderers, who plays as a midfielder. He has played for several Scottish clubs throughout his career which started in 2003.

== Career ==
=== Airdrie United ===
Born in Glasgow, McLaren had been at Benburb and Hamilton Accies u19s before signing professional at Airdrie in 2003.

=== St Johnstone ===
After catching the eye of many clubs, he signed for St Johnstone, in a reported five-figure deal in August 2006. He scored his first league goal for the Perth club in a 3–2 league defeat at Livingston on 13 January 2007. A week later, he scored the winner against his former club. On 30 January 2008, McLaren was released by St Johnstone.

=== Clyde ===
McLaren signed for Clyde on 2 June 2008, after impressing in a trial period at the tail end of the 2007–08 season, including when he scored against former club St Johnstone in a reserve cup semi final, and was on the winning side in the final. He made his Clyde début in July 2008, in a 2–0 victory over Annan Athletic in the Scottish Challenge Cup. McLaren was named Scottish Football League player of the month in January 2009, after scoring 3 goals in consecutive games. McLaren's contract was terminated in June 2009, following Clyde's relegation and financial troubles.

=== Queen of the South ===
McLaren was signed by manager Gordon Chisholm for Dumfries club Queen of the South in June 2009 from Clyde, as was his teammate, goalkeeper David Hutton.

McLaren's first goal for Queens came in the 2–0 home win against Ayr United on 29 August 2009. He also set up Rocco Quinn for Queens second goal of the game.

The departure of Chisholm and strikers' coach Billy Dodds from Queens on 22 March 2010, along with the promotion of Kenny Brannigan to the manager's position, coincided with the beginning of a surge in form from McLaren. McLaren's second goal for Queens was at Palmerston on 27 March 2010 against Dunfermline in another 2–0 home win, when he scored in first half injury time. David Weatherston scored Queens second goal of the match in the second half. McLaren's third goal for Queens was at Palmerston Park on 10 April 2010 against Inverness Caley Thistle, when he gave Queens the lead after 10 minutes. McLaren's fourth goal for Queens was at the Excelsior Stadium on 12 April 2010 against Airdrie United, when he scored the only goal of the match after 88 minutes to give Queens a 1–0 win. McLaren's fifth goal for Queens was in the 3–0 home win against Raith Rovers on 17 April 2010. McLaren scored in the 80th minute and also crossed for Derek Holmes (22 mins) and Paul Burns (25 mins) to score and was rewarded with the man of the match award.

McLaren's sixth goal for Queens arrived after 54 minutes in the 1–0 home win against Ross County on 20 April 2010. This gave McLaren a tally of five goals in a seven-game spell.

After missing much of the early 2010/11 season McLaren returned to the first team on 22 August for the club's third league game of the season, the 3–1 away at Cowdenbeath. This was Queens' first league win of the season. He scored in his next game, the 4–1 League Cup win against Forfar Athletic on 25 August. His excellent form under Brannigan continued in his next game, the 3–0 home league win against Ross County. Collecting the ball at the halfway line, McLaren set off on a dribble and run before scooping the ball over the keeper's head to score.

McLaren was announced by the club on 19 May 2011 as having been released.

On 26 May 2011 McLaren was awarded divisional goal of the season for his counter against Dunfermline Athletic in October.

=== Hamilton ===
McLaren joined relegated SPL club Hamilton Academical on 27 May 2011.

=== Return to Airdrie ===
In November it was announced that McLaren was joining Scottish League Second Division side Airdrie United on loan until January 2012. In December Airdrieonians (then known as Airdrie United) signed him on a deal until the end of season 2011–2012. In April 2012, he was sent off for violent conduct against East Fife F.C. He and East Fife player David White were both sent off in the incident.

Having been released by Airdrie at the end of the season, McLaren resigned for them again at the end of July 2012. In the summer of 2013 Airdrie United reverted to the clubs traditional name Airdrieonians. McLaren departed the club in January 2014.

=== Junior football ===
After leaving Airdrieonians, McLaren signed for Junior club Irvine Meadow. He then signed for Bo'ness United in June 2014 and in January 2015, moved to Kilwinning Rangers. McLaren joined Forth Wanderers in the summer of 2015.

== See also ==
- 2008–09 Clyde F.C. season

== Honours ==
St Johnstone

- Scottish Challenge Cup: 2007–08
