= David McGowan (footballer) =

Scottish footballer

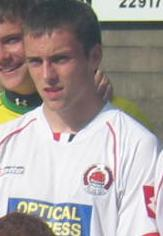

Personal information
- Date of birth: 17 February 1988 (age 38)
- Place of birth: Glasgow, Scotland
- Height: 6 ft 0 in (1.83 m)
- Positions: Midfielder; forward

Youth career
- 2004–2005: Livingston
- 2005–2006: Clyde

Senior career*
Years	Team	Apps	(Gls)
2006–2009	Clyde	30	(3)
2008	→ Arbroath (loan)	5	(2)
2009	→ Arbroath (loan)	9	(1)
2010–2011	Arbroath	32	(6)
2011–2012	Montrose	9	(2)
- Beith Juniors
- * Club domestic league appearances and goals as of 14 January 2012

David McGowan (born 17 February 1988 in Glasgow) is a Scottish football midfielder who played with Montrose.

== Career ==
McGowan signed a YTS contract with the club in the summer of 2006, and made his debut in Clyde's last game of the 2006-07 season as a substitute, against Dundee. McGowan signed his first professional contract in July 2007.

McGowan was used as a lone striker in several games under Colin Hendry. He scored his first senior goal, which turned out to be the winning goal in a Scottish First Division match against Dunfermline on 22 September 2007. He scored his second goal the following week, in a 4-2 defeat at Livingston.

In October 2008, McGowan joined Arbroath as part of a one-month loan deal. McGowan scored on his debut for Arbroath, and made 4 more appearances for them, scoring one more goal. He rejoined Arbroath on loan again in January 2009, playing with them until the end of the season.

McGowan was released by Clyde in June 2009 alongside the other out of contract players, primarily due to the club's financial position.

He played in the Juniors with Beith Juniors.

== See also ==
- Clyde F.C. season 2006-07 | 2007-08 | 2008-09
