= Roddy MacLennan =

Scottish footballer

Personal information
- Date of birth: 3 May 1989 (age 37)
- Place of birth: Livingston, Scotland
- Positions: Midfielder; striker

Youth career
- 2004–2006: BFC Linlithgow
- 2006–2007: Clyde

Senior career*
Years	Team	Apps	(Gls)
2007–2009	Clyde	9	(0)
2009–2016	Linlithgow Rose		
2016–2017	Bo'ness United		
2017–2020	Linlithgow Rose		
- * Club domestic league appearances and goals as of 11:27, 27 July 2016 (UTC)

Roddy MacLennan (born 3 May 1989) is a Scottish former footballer.

== Career ==
MacLennan signed a YTS contract with Clyde in July 2007.

He made his senior debut in a Scottish Cup third round tie against Montrose in November 2007. His older brother Ruari also played in this match, and in doing so, they became the first set of brothers to play for Clyde for 17 years. On the day of this game, MacLennan signed a three-year professional contract.

He made his league debut a week later, in a 0–0 draw against Queen of the South.

His first senior goal came against Queen's Park in August 2008 in the Scottish League Cup. He also won the Man of the Match award in this game. MacLennan's contract was terminated in June 2009, following Clyde's relegation and financial troubles. He decided to quit football after this, and went to study Chemistry at Strathclyde University in Glasgow.

Despite earlier claiming to have quit the game, on 12 August, MacLennan played for Linlithgow Rose in their victory over West Calder United.

MacLennan was called up to the Scotland Junior international squad in October 2012 for their fixture against the Republic of Ireland.

Alongside his brother, MacLennan moved to Linlithgow's historic rivals Bo'ness United in July 2016. However, after only a year he returned home to Prestonfield with his brother and Strickland in the summer of 2017.

== Statistics ==
Correct as of 16 January 2009

Club Performance
Club	Season	League		Cup		League Cup		Other		Total
Club	Season	Apps	Goals	Apps	Goals	Apps	Goals	Apps	Goals	Apps	Goals
Clyde	2007–08	6	0	1	0	0	0	0	0	7	0
Clyde	2008–09	3	0	0	0	1	1	2	0	6	1
Clyde	Total	9	0	1	0	1	1	2	0	13	1
Career Totals		9	0	1	0	1	1	2	0	13	1

== See also ==
- Clyde F.C. season 2007-08 | 2008–09
