= Eddie Mearns =

Scottish footballer

Personal information
- Full name: Edward Joseph Mearns
- Date of birth: 29 March 1989 (age 37)
- Place of birth: Edinburgh, Scotland
- Height: 5 ft 8 in (1.73 m)
- Position: Midfielder

Youth career
- Livingston
- Heart of Midlothian

Senior career*
Years	Team	Apps	(Gls)
2008–2009	Dundee	3	(0)
2009	Berwick Rangers	10	(0)
2009	Bonnyrigg Rose		
2009	→ Tynecastle (loan)		
2009–2012	Tynecastle		
2012–2013	Civil Service Strollers		
2013–2014	Vale of Leithen		
2014–2017	Lothian Thistle Hutchison Vale		
2017–2018	Edinburgh United		
- * Club domestic league appearances and goals

Edward Joseph Mearns (born 29 March 1989 in Edinburgh) is a Scottish footballer who plays part-time for Vale of Leithen F.C.

Dundee signed the youngster from Heart of Midlothian in the summer of 2008. He played in only four matches before being released by Jocky Scott on 3 February 2009. Mearns played 90 minutes in Berwick's 2–1 victory over Stenhousemuir on 21 February, . Mearns then signed for junior side Bonnyrigg Rose at the start of the 2009–10 season.
