= Kenny Brannigan =

Scottish footballer and manager

Personal information
- Full name: Kenneth Brannigan
- Date of birth: 8 June 1965 (age 61)
- Place of birth: Glasgow, Scotland
- Position: Central defender

Youth career
- St. Mary's Calton

Senior career*
Years	Team	Apps	(Gls)
1982–1986	Queen's Park	117	(5)
1986–1988	Sheffield Wednesday	1	(0)
1987	→ Stockport County (loan)	8	(0)
1987–1988	→ Doncaster Rovers (loan)	15	(1)
1988–1989	Kilmarnock	15	(1)
1989–1990	Falkirk	17	(0)
1990–1992	East Stirlingshire	65	(1)
1992–1995	Stranraer	126	(3)
1995–1996	Stenhousemuir	11	(0)
1996–1999	Clydebank	97	(3)
1999	Partick Thistle	10	(0)
1999–2001	Clydebank	54	(2)
2001	Berwick Rangers	5	(1)
2001–2002	Stirling Albion	19	(1)
2002–2003	Airdrie United	16	(0)
Total		576	(18)

Managerial career
- 1997: Clydebank (caretaker)
- 2003–2004: Queen's Park
- 2010–2011: Queen of the South
- * Club domestic league appearances and goals

Kenny Brannigan (born 8 June 1965) is a Scottish former football player and manager.

== Playing career ==
Brannigan was a journeyman professional with a career spanning 21 seasons. A centre back, he played for 14 senior clubs in his career, making over 100 appearances for each of Queen's Park, Stranraer (who he skippered to a second division championship in 1994) and Clydebank. His other clubs included Sheffield Wednesday, Kilmarnock, Falkirk, Partick Thistle, Berwick Rangers, and Stirling Albion.

== Coaching career ==
Brannigan was caretaker manager of Clydebank in 1997. He became Queen's Park manager in January 2003, taking over from John McCormack, when the latter left to manage Morton. Brannigan quit in August 2004 amidst reports over a touchline fight with a player and a supporter. With Airdrie United he was also assistant manager, as he was with Stirling Albion.

=== Queen of the South ===
When Gordon Chisholm was promoted to the role as manager of Dumfries club Queen of the South in the 2007 close season, he appointed Brannigan as his assistant. This coincided with chairman Davie Rae announcing that the club would go full-time. Chisholm and Brannigan guided Queens to only their second ever Scottish Cup semi-final appearance with a 2–0 quarter final victory against Dundee. Queens followed this with a 4–3 win against Aberdeen in the semi-final, which meant that they reached their first ever Scottish Cup Final appearance. Despite second half Queens goals by Steve Tosh and Jim Thomson, Rangers ran out 3–2 winners in the final. The Scottish Cup runners-up spot led to a UEFA Cup 2nd qualification round place. Despite losing both legs against FC Nordsjælland, Branningan later described the away leg in Denmark as the highlight of his career.

After two mid-table finishes in the Scottish Football League First Division, Chisholm left Queens to manage Dundee. Brannigan was promoted to the managerial position, as the club announced that he would "take over the managerial role at Palmerston until the end of the season". Brannigan was reported as saying that the promotion had come "as a bit of a surprise". Brannigan was offered the post of Queen of the South manager on 20 April 2010 through to May 2011 and he accepted the position. Chairman Davie Rae said "Kenny has had some excellent results since we asked him to take over the manager's role from Gordon Chisholm and we're delighted he has accepted on a more permanent basis".

He managed Queen of the South to a long postponed 2010 Scottish Challenge Cup Final where in a disappointing performance his side lost 2–0 against Ross County. Queen of the South informed Brannigan that his contract would not be renewed when his current deal expires on 31 May 2011. In his one full season in charge at Queens he took the club to 4th in Scotland's second tier as well as the Challenge Cup Final despite cost cuts placed upon him. On 21 May 2011, the club confirmed his departure, stating, "last season proved a difficult one for all concerned, and he was informed yesterday that his contract wouldn't be extended."

=== Later career ===
Having been involved in managing property and licensed premises for a period, as of April 2020 he was based in the United States, working as a coach and talent-spotter, and also working as a scout for Hamilton Academical.
