= Paul Emslie =

Scottish footballer

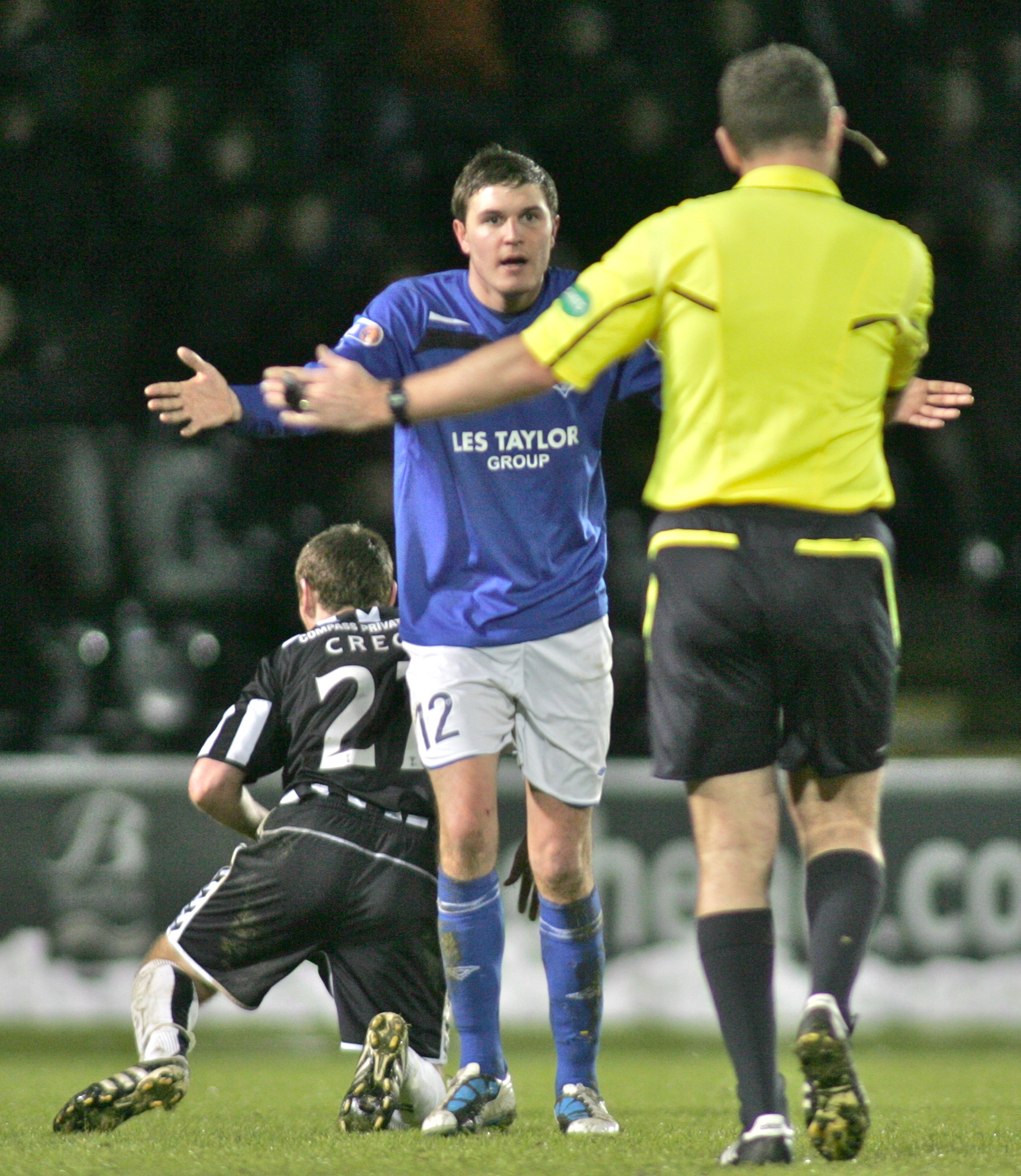
- Emslie playing for Peterhead

Personal information
- Full name: Paul Stephen Emslie
- Date of birth: 13 March 1988 (age 38)
- Place of birth: Aberdeen, Scotland
- Position: Midfielder

Team information
- Current team: Cove Rangers

Youth career
- 2005–2007: Rangers

Senior career*
Years	Team	Apps	(Gls)
2007–2010	Rangers	0	(0)
2008–2009	→ Clyde (loan)	9	(0)
2010	→ Peterhead (loan)	15	(2)
2010–2011	Peterhead	27	(2)
2011–	Cove Rangers	76	(12)

International career
2006	Scotland U19	3	(0)
2007	Scotland U20	1	(0)
- * Club domestic league appearances and goals as of 19:38, 25 June 2011 (UTC)

Paul Stephen Emslie (born 13 March 1988) is a Scottish footballer who plays as a midfielder for Scottish Highland Football League side Cove Rangers.

== Career ==
=== Rangers ===
Emslie started his career with Rangers. He made one first team appearance for the club, in a Scottish League Cup match against East Fife on 26 September 2007. Emslie came on as a substitute for Charlie Adam. Emslie also represented the Scotland U19 and Scotland U20 teams.

He played in the Scottish Youth Cup final in 2007, with Rangers beating Celtic 5–0 at Hampden Park.

=== Clyde ===
On 30 August 2008, Emslie signed for Clyde on loan until 5 January 2009, along with fellow Rangers youth player Alan Lowing. He made his Clyde début a week later, in a 1–0 defeat to Ross County in the Scottish Challenge Cup. The loan spell was set to be extended until the end of January, but Emslie returned to Ibrox early after picking up an injury. He made 11 appearances in all competitions.

=== Peterhead ===
Emslie joined Peterhead on loan for the rest of the 2009–10 season. He returned to Peterhead on a one-year contract for the following season, having been released by Rangers.

=== Cove Rangers ===
After being relegated to the Third Division with Peterhead, Emslie dropped down to the Highland League to sign for Cove Rangers in 2011.
