= Alan Lowing =

Scottish footballer (born 1988)

Personal information
- Full name: Alan Alexander Lowing
- Date of birth: 7 January 1988 (age 38)
- Place of birth: Rutherglen, Scotland
- Height: 5 ft 10 in (1.78 m)
- Position: Right-back

Senior career*
Years	Team	Apps	(Gls)
2005–2010	Rangers	2	(0)
2008–2009	→ Clyde (loan)	17	(0)
2010–2011	East Fife	7	(0)
2011–2013	Fram	59	(0)
2014–2017	Víkingur	74	(0)
Total		159	(0)

International career
2006	Scotland U19	2	(0)
2007	Scotland U20	3	(0)
- * Club domestic league appearances and goals

Alan Alexander Lowing (born 7 January 1988) is a Scottish former professional footballer who played as a right-back.

== Career ==
=== Rangers ===
Lowing was born in Rutherglen. He made his first team debut for Rangers on 20 September 2005 in a Scottish League Cup match against Clyde at Ibrox. He played the full 120 minutes of the match with Rangers running out as eventually winners by 5–2. His first league appearance for the Gers was on 1 October 2005 when he replaced Barry Ferguson and played the final 13 minutes in Rangers 5–1 win over Dunfermline Athletic. He made his second start in a Scottish Premier League game against Dundee United on 31 December and was used as a second-half substitute in the 5–0 win over Peterhead in the third round of the Scottish Cup. However, the return of Alan Hutton and injury kept Lowing out of both the team for the remainder of the season. He made his full European debut against Partizan Belgrade at Ibrox on 14 December 2006.

In November 2007, Lowing signed a one-year extension to his Rangers deal to remain with the club until 2009. Lowing signed a new six-month contract extension in June 2009. In total Lowing played 5 first team games for Rangers.

=== Clyde ===
On 30 August 2008, Lowing signed for Clyde on loan until January 2009, along with fellow Rangers youth Paul Emslie. He made his Clyde debut on the same day, playing the full 90 minutes in a 3–2 victory over St Johnstone. The loan deal was extended at the end of 2008, until the end of January 2009. He made 19 appearances for the Bully Wee in all competitions.

=== East Fife ===
On 5 March 2010, Lowing joined East Fife on a deal until the end of the season. He had left Rangers in January after his contract had expired. His contract with East Fife was not renewed, as he had got injured in a game while at the club and it looked like he would be out of action for a while.

=== Fram ===
On 15 April 2011, Lowing joined Fram Reykjavik on a two-week trial. After impressing, he signed a permanent deal with the club on 29 April 2011.

=== Víkingur ===
On 11 November 2013, Lowing joined Víkingur Reykjavik on a one-year contract. Putting together a string of impressive performances in his first season with Víkingur he signed a new two-year contract with the club on 12 September 2014.

Lowing left Víkingur in 2017 and subsequently announced his retirement from football.
