= Ricky Waddell =

Scottish footballer and coach (born 1981)

Personal information
- Full name: Richard Alexander Waddell
- Date of birth: 4 February 1981 (age 45)
- Place of birth: Falkirk, Scotland
- Positions: Defender; midfielder

Team information
- Current team: Rangers (Academy under-15s coach)

Senior career*
Years	Team	Apps	(Gls)
1998–2002	Falkirk	35	(4)
2002–2004	Partick Thistle	23	(2)
2004–2005	Hamilton Academical	28	(0)
2005–2006	Forfar Athletic	33	(3)
2006	Sengkang Punggol	28	(4)
2007	Ayr United	10	(4)
2007–2008	Airdrie United	32	(2)
2008–2009	Clyde	28	(4)
2009–2010	Airdrie United	29	(4)
2010–2011	Clyde	31	(1)
2012	Los Angeles Blues	11	(1)
Total		288	(29)

Managerial career
- 2015–2026: Caledonian Braves
- * Club domestic league appearances and goals

Richard Alexander Waddell (born 4 February 1981) is a Scottish football player and coach who was, most recently, head coach of Scottish Lowland Football League team Caledonian Braves. His playing career as a defender or midfielder saw him play for Scottish clubs including Falkirk, Partick Thistle, Hamilton Academical, Airdrie United and Clyde, as well as spells in Singapore and the United States.

== Playing career ==
Waddell began his career with hometown team Falkirk, before joining Partick Thistle in 2003. He spent two years with the Jags, before having spells at Hamilton Academical and Forfar Athletic.

In 2006, he left Scotland, and joined Singaporean outfit Senkang Punggol. He returned to his home country in 2007, signing for Ayr United, before joining Airdrie United later in the same year.

He joined Clyde on 2 June 2008. He made his Clyde debut in a 2–0 victory against Alloa Athletic in the Scottish Challenge Cup in August 2008. Waddell's first goal for Clyde turned out to be the winning goal in a 3–2 victory over St Johnstone on 30 August 2008. Waddell's contract was terminated in June 2009, following Clyde's relegation and financial troubles. He went on to rejoin Airdrie United. After a season back at Airdrie, he joined Clyde again, where he stayed for a year, before being released in May 2011.

== Managerial career ==
Waddell was appointed manager of Lowland Football League team Caledonian Braves in 2015. After 12 years with the Braves organisation, Waddell has left the team.

== See also ==
- 2008–09 Clyde F.C. season
