= Tony Stevenson =

Scottish footballer

Personal information
- Full name: Anthony Stevenson
- Date of birth: 24 July 1988 (age 38)
- Place of birth: Glasgow, Scotland
- Height: 5 ft 7 in (1.70 m)
- Positions: Right back; midfielder

Team information
- Current team: Petershill

Youth career
- Hamilton Academical

Senior career*
Years	Team	Apps	(Gls)
2005–2010	Hamilton Academical	44	(8)
2006	→ Alloa Athletic (loan)	12	(0)
2009	→ Clyde (loan)	9	(0)
2010	→ Alloa Athletic (loan)	6	(0)
2010–2013	Albion Rovers	85	(6)
2013–2014	Sauchie Juniors		
2014–	Petershill		
- * Club domestic league appearances and goals as of 20:33, 29 July 2014 (UTC)

Anthony Stevenson (born 24 July 1988) is a Scottish footballer who plays as a right back and midfielder for Petershill in the Scottish Junior Football Association, West Region. He has previously played in the Scottish Premier League for Hamilton Academical.

== Career ==
Born in Glasgow, Stevenson began his career with Hamilton Academical. He made his senior debut for the Accies in August 2005, in a Scottish League Cup tie against Dumbarton. He spent the rest of the season on loan at Alloa Athletic, where he made 16 appearances, scoring 1 goal. He scored a penalty in a 2–0 victory over Clyde in April 2008, on the day Hamilton won promotion to the Scottish Premier League. On 17 May 2008, Stevenson signed an extension to his contract that will keep him with Hamilton until 2010. Stevenson was the first Hamilton player to score a goal in the SPL, scoring a free-kick in Accies' 3–1 victory over Dundee United in their first ever SPL game.

He joined Clyde in January 2009, on a loan deal until the end of the season. He made his debut in a 4–2 defeat against Partick Thistle on 3 January. He made 9 appearances in total for Clyde. After returning to Hamilton, Stevenson was again loaned to Alloa in March 2010, where he made six SFL appearances for them.

Stevenson was released from his contract with Hamilton at the end of the 2009–10 season. He subsequently joined Albion Rovers on an initial one-month deal. In May 2011, Stevenson played in two play-off games for Albion, which secured promotion to the Second Division.

Stevenson was released by Albion at the end of the 2012–13 season, and he subsequently had an unsuccessful trial with Northern Irish team Portadown.

On 24 September 2013, Stevenson joined Sauchie Juniors before moving to fellow Junior side Petershill in July 2014.

== Career statistics ==
As of 29 September 2013

Club	Season	League		FA Cup		League Cup		Other		Total	
Club	Season	Apps	Goals	Apps	Goals	Apps	Goals	Apps	Goals	Apps	Goals
Hamilton Academical	2005–06	0	0	0	0	1	0	0	0	1	0
Hamilton Academical	2006–07	21	3	1	0	1	0	1	0	24	3
Hamilton Academical	2007–08	16	4	3	0	2	0	1	0	22	4
Hamilton Academical	2008–09	7	1	0	0	1	1	0	0	8	2
Hamilton Academical	2009–10	0	0	0	0	0	0	0	0	0	0
Hamilton Academical	Total	44	8	4	0	5	1	2	0	55	9
Alloa Athletic (loan)	2005–06	12	0	0	0	0	0	4	1	16	1
Alloa Athletic (loan)	2009–10	6	0	0	0	0	0	0	0	6	0
Alloa Athletic (loan)	Total	18	0	0	0	0	0	4	1	22	1
Clyde (loan)	2008–09	9	0	0	0	0	0	0	0	9	0
Albion Rovers	2010–11	32	3	0	0	0	0	4	0	36	3
Albion Rovers	2011–12	34	0	0	0	1	0	1	0	36	0
Albion Rovers	2012–13	19	3	0	0	0	0	0	0	19	3
Albion Rovers	Total	85	6	0	0	1	0	5	0	91	6
Career total		156	14	4	0	6	1	11	1	177	16

== Honours ==
Hamilton Academical

- Scottish Football League First Division: 2007–08
