= Jean-José Cuenca =

French footballer (born 1986)

Personal information
- Date of birth: 22 April 1986 (age 40)
- Place of birth: Bourgoin-Jallieu, France
- Height: 1.69 m (5 ft 7 in)
- Position: Midfielder

Youth career
- Lyon

Senior career*
Years	Team	Apps	(Gls)
2007–2008	Angoulême	0	(0)
2008–2009	Livingston	8	(0)
- * Club domestic league appearances and goals

Jean-José Cuenca (born 22 April 1986) is a French former professional footballer who played as a midfielder. He played for Lyon youth teams, playing alongside Karim Benzema and Hatem Ben Arfa. Cuenca signed on a three-year contract for Scottish First Division club Livingston in June 2008 from Angoulême on a free transfer. He made eight league appearances but was released at the end of the 2008–09 season.
