= Michael Ohnesorge =

German footballer (born 1983)

Personal information
- Date of birth: 29 September 1983 (age 43)
- Place of birth: Wittenberg, West Germany
- Height: 1.85 m (6 ft 1 in)
- Position: Defender

Youth career
- 2002–2003: FP 08 Duisburg
- 2003–2004: Hamborn 07

Senior career*
Years	Team	Apps	(Gls)
2004–2005	Adler Osterfeld		
2005–2006	SG Wattenscheid 09	26	(2)
2006–2007	Schalke 04 II	22	(6)
2007–2008	SV Elversberg	13	(0)
2008	Clyde	10	(0)
2009–2015	TV Jahn Hiesfeld		
2019	TV Jahn Hiesfeld	6	(0)
- * Club domestic league appearances and goals

Michael Ohnesorge (born 29 September 1983) is a German former professional footballer who played as a defender.

== Career ==
=== Germany ===
Ohnesorge was born in Wittenberg, Saxony-Anhalt, and began his career with youth clubs FP 08 Duisburg and Hamborn 07, before stepping up to the senior game with Adler Osterfeld in 2004. He then had one year spells with SG Wattenscheid 09, FC Schalke 04 II and SV Elversberg.

=== Scotland ===
In July 2008, Ohnesorge came to Scotland, to go on trial with Clyde. He joined the squad on their pre-season tour, and scored in a game against Norwich City. After impressing during his trial period, he signed a two-year contract. He made his Clyde debut in the first league game of the 2008–09 season in August 2008, in a 1–1 draw with Greenock Morton. He had his contract terminated by mutual consent in December 2008, after making 14 appearances in all competitions.

=== Return to Germany ===
After the end of his contract leaves Scotland and signed in January 2009 with TV Jahn Hiesfeld who was named as Captain in the Niederrheinliga.
