= Stephen Ettien =

French footballer (born 1988)

Personal information
- Date of birth: 10 April 1988 (age 38)
- Place of birth: Toulouse, France
- Height: 1.73 m (5 ft 8 in)
- Position: Midfielder

Team information
- Current team: Aussonne Football

Youth career
- Balma
- JS Cugnaux
- Lyon

Senior career*
Years	Team	Apps	(Gls)
2008–2009	Hamilton Academical	6	(0)
2009	→ Brechin City (loan)	14	(4)
2009–2010	Terrassa		
2010–2011	Toulon	30	(1)
2011–2012	TF Croix Daurade		
2012–2015	US Colomiers	66	(12)
2015–2016	Entente Golfech		
2016–2018	Blagnac		
2018	Balma	19	(7)
2019	TMFC (futsal)		
2019–	Aussonne Football		
- * Club domestic league appearances and goals as of 11:24, 23 November 2019 (UTC)

Stephen Ettien (born 10 April 1988) is a French professional footballer who plays as a midfielder for French club Aussonne Football.

== Career ==
Ettien spent his early career in France with Balma, Cugnaux and Lyon.

He signed for Scottish club Hamilton Academical in August 2008, making his debut for the club in September 2008. In total he made 8 appearances for Hamilton in all competitions, scoring one goal. He moved on loan to Brechin City in January 2009, scoring 4 goals in 14 League appearances for them. Ettien was released from his contract with Hamilton in 2009.

He later played back in France with Toulon and US Colomiers.

In January 2019, Ettien joined futsal team TMFC. Six months later, he left the team to join Etoile Aussonnaise Football.
