= Ian Maxwell (footballer) =

Scottish footballer and executive

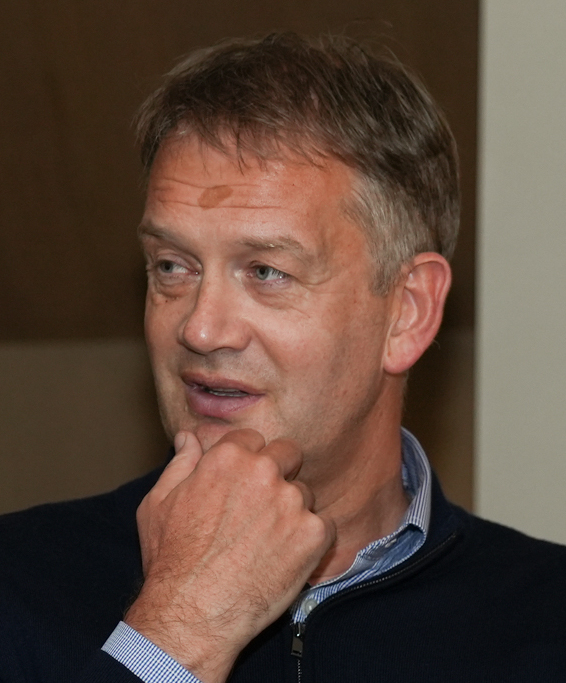
- Maxwell in 2026

Personal information
- Full name: Ian Gardner Maxwell
- Date of birth: 2 May 1975 (age 51)
- Place of birth: Glasgow, Scotland
- Height: 6 ft 3 in (1.91 m)
- Position: Defender

Youth career
- Chryston Amateurs

Senior career*
Years	Team	Apps	(Gls)
1993–1998	Queen's Park	156	(17)
1998–2002	Ross County	138	(5)
2002–2005	St Johnstone	100	(5)
2005–2008	St Mirren	54	(3)
2008–2010	Partick Thistle	55	(3)
Total		503	(33)
- * Club domestic league appearances and goals

Ian Gardner Maxwell (born 2 May 1975) is a Scottish football executive and former player who is currently the Chief Executive of the Scottish Football Association.

== Playing career ==
Born in Glasgow, Maxwell started his career with Queen's Park and played at Hampden Park for five years before moving to Ross County in 1998. He was part of the Staggies team that won the 1998–99 Scottish Third Division and then finished third in the 1999–2000 Scottish Second Division to secure a second consecutive promotion. He signed for St Johnstone in 2002, playing in the Scottish First Division for three more seasons before signing for First Division rivals St Mirren in 2005.

Maxwell played in defence and was part of the St Mirren side which won the Scottish First Division title in the 2005–06 season. In May 2008, having played in 33 Scottish Premier League games across two seasons, he moved back to the First Division with Partick Thistle but was released at the end of the 2009–10 season.

== Administrative career ==
A few weeks later he was back at Thistle, as assistant manager to Ian McCall. After McCall stepped down as Thistle manager in April 2011, Jackie McNamara and Simon Donnelly took control of the team, while Maxwell became the general manager. He was promoted to the position of managing director in 2014.

In April 2018, the Scottish Football Association announced that Maxwell would be appointed as their chief executive at the end of the 2017–18 season.

== See also ==
- List of footballers in Scotland by number of league appearances (500+)
