= 2009–10 Dundee F.C. season =

Dundee
2009–10 season
- Chairman: Bob Brannan
- Manager: Jocky Scott (until 20 March 2010); Gordon Chisholm (from 21 March 2010)
- Stadium: Dens Park
- Scottish First Division: 2nd
- Scottish Cup: Quarter-final (eliminated by Raith Rovers)
- League Cup: Quarter-Final (eliminated by Rangers)
- Challenge Cup: Winners
- Top goalscorer: League: Gary Harkins (15); All: Leigh Griffiths (21)
- Highest home attendance: 5,507 (vs Dunfermline Athletic, 12 September 2009)
- Lowest home attendance: 3,187 (vs Raith Rovers, 24 April 2010)
- Average home league attendance: 4,760
Home colours

The 2009–10 season was Dundee's 5th consecutive season in the Scottish First Division following their relegation from the SPL in 2005. Dundee finished as runners-up in the league, losing out to Inverness Caledonian Thistle. The Dee reached the quarter-finals in both the Scottish Cup & Scottish League Cup and were winners of the Challenge Cup for the second time in the club's history and first since 1991.

== Match results ==
=== Scottish First Division ===
Win Draw Loss

Fixture Date Week/Round	Home team	Score	Away team	Venue

8 August 2009 Week 1	Dundee	1–0	Greenock Morton	Dens Park, Dundee
15:00	Higgins 56'	BBC Sport		Attendance: 5,449; Referee: Boyle

15 August 2009 Week 2	Raith Rovers	2–2	Dundee	Stark's Park, Kirkcaldy
15:00	Williamson 30'; Ellis 41'	BBC Sport	Harkins 5' (pen.); McMenamin 73'	Attendance: 4,744; Referee: Richmond

22 August 2009 Week 3	Dundee	2–2	Inverness Caledonian Thistle	Dens Park, Dundee
	Harkins 9', 29'	BBC Sport	Sánchez 20'; Cox 38'	Attendance: 5,507; Referee: Tumilty

29 August 2009 Week 4	Airdrie United	1–1	Dundee	Excelsior Stadium, Airdrie
15:00	Lauchlan 42' (o.g.)	BBC Sport	McMenamin 36'	Attendance: 1,516; Referee: Nicholls

12 September 2009 Week 5	Dundee	1–0	Dunfermline Athletic	Dens Park, Dundee
15:00	Harkins 37' (pen.)	BBC Sport		Attendance: 5,326; Referee: Thomson

19 September 2009 Week 6	Queen of the South	2–0	Dundee	Palmerston Park, Dumfries
15:00	Tosh 6' (pen.); Holmes 61'	BBC Sport	Bullock (red card) 5'	Attendance: 2,875; Referee: Robertson

26 September 2009 Week 7	Dundee	2–0	Ross County	Dens Park, Dundee
15:00	Griffiths 59', 77'	BBC Sport		Attendance: 4,682; Referee: Somers

10 October 2009 Week 8	Dundee	2–0	Partick Thistle	Dens Park, Dundee
15:00	Griffiths 4'; Harkins 48'	BBC Sport		Attendance: 5,364; Referee: Allan

14 October 2009 Week 9	Ayr United	2–2	Dundee	Somerset Park, Ayr
19:45	McGowan 73'; Stevenson 86'	BBC Sport	Forsyth 13'; Griffiths 60'	Attendance: 1,710; Referee: McKendrick

17 October 2009 Week 10	Greenock Morton	0–1	Dundee	Cappielow Park, Greenock
15:00		BBC Sport	Griffiths 77'	Attendance: 2,217; Referee: Winter

24 October 2009 Week 11	Dundee	2–1	Raith Rovers	Dens Park, Dundee
15:00	McMenamin 15'; MacKenzie 35'	BBC Sport	Smith 20'	Attendance: 5,156; Referee: Brown

31 October 2009 Week 12	Dunfermline Athletic	1–1	Dundee	East End Park, Dunfermline
15:00	Bayne 77'	BBC Sport	Harkins 60'	Attendance: 4,001; Referee: Norris

7 November 2009 Week 13	Dundee	2–1	Airdrie United	Dens Park, Dundee
15:00	Higgins 28', 35'	BBC Sport	Baird 25'	Attendance: 4,121; Referee: McDermott

14 November 2009 Week 14	Dundee	0–0	Queen of the South	Dens Park, Dundee
15:00		BBC Sport		Attendance: 4,901; Referee: Law

1 December 2009 Week 15	Ross County	0–1	Dundee	Victoria Park, Dingwall
19:45		BBC Sport	Harkins 69'	Attendance: 2,005; Referee: Nicholls

5 December 2009 Week 16	Partick Thistle	0–2	Dundee	Firhill Stadium, Glasgow
15:00		BBC Sport	McMenamin 44'; Harkins 47'	Attendance: 4,453; Referee: Thomson

12 December 2009 Week 17	Dundee	3–1	Ayr United	Dens Park, Dundee
15:00	Forsyth 23'; Griffiths 66'; Harkins 90'	BBC Sport	Reynolds 3'	Attendance: 4,323; Referee: Finnie

19 December 2009 Week 18	Dundee	3–1	Greenock Morton	Dens Park, Dundee
15:00	Griffiths 54'; Harkins 65'; Malone 87'	BBC Sport	Weatherson 60'	Attendance: 4,259; Referee: Murray

26 December 2009 Week 19	Inverness Caledonian Thistle	1–1	Dundee	Caledonian Stadium, Inverness
15:00	Rooney 57'	BBC Sport	Griffiths 45' (pen.); Harkins (yellow card) 85' (yellow-red card)	Attendance: 3,660; Referee: Nicholls

3 January 2010 Week 20	Dundee	0–1	Airdrie United	Dens Park, Dundee
15:00	MacKenzie (red card) 45'	BBC Sport	McDonald 25' (pen.); Donnelly (yellow card) 90' (yellow-red card)	Attendance: 4,319; Referee: Brown

17 January 2010 Week 21	Dundee	3–2	Dunfermline Athletic	Dens Park, Dundee
15:00	Griffiths 2', 82'; McMenamin 17'	BBC Sport	Graham 10'; Kirk 49'	Attendance: 5,201; Referee: Brines

23 January 2010 Week 22	Queen of the South	1–1	Dundee	Palmerston Park, Dumfries
15:00	Harris 6'	BBC Sport	Griffiths 77'	Attendance: 3,415; Referee: Richmond

30 January 2010 Week 23	Dundee	0–1	Ross County	Dens Park, Dundee
15:00		BBC Sport	Lawson 44'	Attendance: 4,912; Referee: Tumilty

20 February 2010 Week 24	Dundee	1–0	Partick Thistle	Dens Park, Dundee
15:00	Paton 6'	BBC Sport		Attendance: 5,216; Referee: McKendrick

6 March 2010 Week 25	Dundee	2–2	Inverness Caledonian Thistle	Dens Park, Dundee
15:00	Kerr 78'; Harkins 84'	BBC Sport	Foran 46'; Odhiambo 59'	Attendance: 4,974; Referee: Brown

17 March 2010 Week 26	Ayr United	1–1	Dundee	Somerset Park, Ayr
19:45	Lafferty 42'	BBC Sport	Harkins 38'; Paton (yellow card) 76' (yellow-red card)	Attendance: 1,375; Referee: Winter

20 March 2010 Week 27	Airdrie United	3–0	Dundee	Excelsior Stadium, Airdrie
15:00	McLaughlin 54'; O'Carroll 60'; Gemill 75'	BBC Sport		Attendance: 1,172; Referee: Finnie

23 March 2010 Week 28	Dundee	1–1	Queen of the South	Dens Park, Dundee
19:45	Griffiths 16' (pen.)	BBC Sport	McAusland (red card) 16'; Harris 58'	Attendance: 4,508; Referee: Tumilty

27 March 2010 Week 29	Ross County	1–1	Dundee	Victoria Park, Dingwall
15:00	Craig 87'	BBC Sport	Hutchinson 50'	Attendance: 3,295; Referee: Thomson

30 March 2010 Week 30	Dunfermline Athletic	2–1	Dundee	East End Park, Dunfermline
19:45	Gibson 6'; Bell 34'	BBC Sport	Harkins 90'	Attendance: 2,134; Referee: Collum

3 April 2010 Week 31	Dundee	3–0	Ayr United	Dens Park, Dundee
15:00	McMenamin 10', 61'; Higgins 22'	BBC Sport		Attendance: 4,270; Referee: MacDonald

10 April 2010 Week 32	Partick Thistle	0–1	Dundee	Firhill Stadium, Glasgow
15:00		BBC Sport	Clarke 75'	Attendance: 2,545; Referee: O'Reilly

17 April 2010 Week 33	Greenock Morton	2–2	Dundee	Cappielow Park, Greenock
15:00	Witteveen 41'; Monti 64' (pen.)	BBC Sport	Harkins 67'; Griffiths 86'	Attendance: 1,998; Referee: Muir

21 April 2010 Week 34	Raith Rovers	1–0	Dundee	Stark's Park, Kirkcaldy
19:45	Hill 54'	BBC Sport		Attendance: 1,544; Referee: Law

24 April 2010 Week 35	Dundee	2–0	Raith Rovers	Dens Park, Dundee
15:00	Hiigins 52'; Harkins 65' (pen.)	BBC Sport	Armstrong (yellow card) 84' (yellow-red card)	Attendance: 3,187; Referee: Nicholls

1 May 2010 Week 36	Inverness Caledonian Thistle	1–0	Dundee	Caledonian Stadium, Inverness
15:00	Rooney 28'	BBC Sport		Attendance: 6,031; Referee: Conroy

=== Scottish Cup ===
20 January 2010 Fourth round	Livingston	0–1	Dundee	Almondvale Stadium, Livingston
19:45		BBC Sport	Harkins 33'	Attendance: 1,176; Referee: Collum

6 February 2010 Fifth round	Dundee	2–1	Ayr United	Dens Park, Dundee
15:00	Hutchinson 41'; Griffiths 70'	BBC Sport	McManus 11'	Attendance: 2,852; Referee: McDonald

13 March 2010 Quarter-final	Dundee	1–2	Raith Rovers	Dens Park, Dundee
15:00	Forsyth 73'	BBC Sport	Simmons 3'; Ellis 10'	Attendance: 7,306; Referee: Richmond

=== Scottish League Cup ===
1 August 2009 First round	Dundee	5–0	Stranraer	Dens Park, Dundee
15:00	Higgins 23'; Harkins 29'; Cameron 37'; McMenamin 47'; Griffiths 67'	BBC Sport	Mitchell (red card) 84'	Attendance: 2,345; Referee: Collum

25 August 2009 Second round	Forfar Athletic	2–4	Dundee	Station Park, Forfar
19:45	Tulloch 55'; Campbell 72'	BBC Sport	Griffiths 11'; Antoine-Curier 15', 31'; Tod 67' (o.g.)	Attendance: 1,929; Referee: O'Reilly

22 September 2009 Third round	Dundee	3–2 (a.e.t.)	Aberdeen	Dens Park, Dundee
19:45	Malone 39'; Forsyth 55'; Griffiths 105'	BBC Sport	Paton 63', 88'	Attendance: 6,131; Referee: Conroy

27 October 2009 Quarter-final	Dundee	1–3	Rangers	Dens Park, Dundee
19:45	Griffiths 29'	BBC Sport	Whittaker 15'; MacKenzie 57' (o.g.); Fleck 85'	Attendance: 10,654; Referee: McDonald

=== Scottish Challenge Cup ===
18 August 2009 Second round	Cowdenbeath	0–3	Dundee	Central Park, Cowdenbeath
19:30		BBC Sport	Griffiths 20'; Harkins 82'; Antoine-Curier 88'	Attendance: 457; Referee: Salmond

6 September 2009 Quarter-final	Stirling Albion	1–2	Dundee	Forthbank Stadium, Stirling
15:00	Devine 89' (pen.)	BBC Sport	Griffiths 10', 26'	Attendance: 1,277; Referee: Norris

4 October 2009 Semi-final	Dundee	3–0	Annan Athletic	Dens Park, Dundee
19:45	Higgins 37'; Clarke 63'; Forsyth 71'	SFL Report		Attendance: 2,321; Referee: Finnie

==== Final ====
22 November 2009 Final	Dundee	3–2	Inverness Caledonian Thistle	McDiarmid Park, Perth
15:00	Bulvītis 48' (o.g.); Harkins 53'; Forsyth 83'	BBC Sport	Rooney 20'; Bulvītis 33'	Attendance: 8,031; Referee: Richmond

== Player statistics ==
=== Squad ===
Last updated 9 December 2011

No.	Pos	Nat	Player	Total		Scottish First Division		Scottish Cup		League Cup		Challenge Cup	
No.	Pos	Nat	Player	Apps	Goals	Apps	Goals	Apps	Goals	Apps	Goals	Apps	Goals
	GK	(England) ENG	Tony Bullock	26	0	19+0	0	0+0	0	3+1	0	3+0	0
	GK	(Scotland) SCO	Rab Douglas	20	0	15+1	0	2+0	0	1+0	0	1+0	0
	GK	(Scotland) SCO	Bobby Geddes	1	0	0+1	0	0+0	0	0+0	0	0+0	0
	GK	(Scotland) SCO	Derek Soutar	3	0	2+0	0	1+0	0	0+0	0	0+0	0
	DF	(Scotland) SCO	Kyle Benedictus	11	0	4+1	0	1+0	0	2+0	0	2+1	0
	DF	(Northern Ireland) NIR	Chris Casement	6	0	0+1	0	1+0	0	1+1	0	1+1	0
	DF	(England) ENG	David Cowan	9	0	5+1	0	0+0	0	1+0	0	2+0	0
	DF	(Slovakia) SVK	Maroš Klimpl	22	0	16+2	0	1+1	0	1+0	0	1+0	0
	DF	(Scotland) SCO	Jim Lauchlan	34	0	25+0	0	3+0	0	3+0	0	2+1	0
	DF	(Scotland) SCO	Gary MacKenzie	32	1	24+1	1	2+0	0	2+0	0	3+0	0
	DF	(Scotland) SCO	Robert Malcolm	3	0	3+0	0	0+0	0	0+0	0	0+0	0
	DF	(Scotland) SCO	Eddie Malone	43	2	33+0	1	3+0	0	4+0	1	3+0	0
	DF	(Scotland) SCO	Craig McKeown	11	0	9+2	0	0+0	0	0+0	0	0+0	0
	DF	(Scotland) SCO	Ryan O'Leary	8	0	8+0	0	0+0	0	0+0	0	0+0	0
	DF	(Scotland) SCO	Eric Paton	42	1	32+0	1	2+1	0	4+0	0	3+0	0
	DF	(Scotland) SCO	Connor Rennie	0	0	0+0	0	0+0	0	0+0	0	0+0	0
	MF	(Scotland) SCO	Colin Cameron	18	1	5+9	0	0+0	0	2+0	1	2+0	0
	MF	(Scotland) SCO	Craig Forsyth	34	6	20+4	2	3+0	1	3+0	1	3+1	2
	MF	(Scotland) SCO	Gary Harkins	45	19	32+2	15	3+0	1	4+0	1	3+1	2
	MF	(Scotland) SCO	Richie Hart	32	0	20+6	0	1+0	0	1+1	0	3+0	0
	MF	(Scotland) SCO	Brian Kerr	43	1	29+4	1	3+0	0	2+2	0	3+0	0
	MF	(Scotland) SCO	Paul McHale	18	0	11+3	0	0+0	0	2+0	0	2+0	0
	MF	(Scotland) SCO	Andrew Shinnie	14	0	9+3	0	0+2	0	0+0	0	0+0	0
	MF	(Scotland) SCO	Jordan Timmons	0	0	0+0	0	0+0	0	0+0	0	0+0	0
	MF	(Scotland) SCO	Darren Young	7	0	2+3	0	1+0	0	0+0	0	1+0	0
	FW	(Guadeloupe) GLP	Mickaël Antoine-Curier	2	3	0+0	0	0+0	0	1+0	2	1+0	1
	FW	(Scotland) SCO	Pat Clarke	23	2	3+14	1	0+1	0	0+2	0	1+2	1
	FW	(Scotland) SCO	Leigh Griffiths	39	21	24+5	13	3+0	1	2+2	4	3+0	3
	FW	(Scotland) SCO	Sean Higgins	32	7	16+10	5	1+0	0	3+0	1	2+0	1
	FW	(England) ENG	Ben Hutchinson	13	3	5+4	1	1+0	1	3+0	1	0+0	0
	FW	(Scotland) SCO	Colin McMenamin	40	8	23+8	7	0+3	0	2+1	1	1+2	0

Players with a zero in every column only appeared as unused substitutes

=== Disciplinary record ===
Includes all competitive matches.

Last updated 9 December 2011

Nation	Position	Name	Scottish First Division		Scottish Cup		League Cup		Challenge Cup		Total	
Nation	Position	Name	Booked	Sent off (straight red)	Booked	Sent off (straight red)	Booked	Sent off (straight red)	Booked	Sent off (straight red)	Booked	Sent off (straight red)
(England)	GK	Tony Bullock	0	1	0	0	0	0	0	0	0	1
(Scotland)	GK	Rab Douglas	1	0	0	0	0	0	0	0	1	0
(Scotland)	GK	Bobby Geddes	0	0	0	0	0	0	0	0	0	0
(Scotland)	GK	Derek Soutar	0	0	0	0	0	0	0	0	0	0
(Scotland)	DF	Kyle Benedictus	3	0	0	0	0	0	0	0	3	0
(Northern Ireland)	DF	Chris Casement	0	0	0	0	0	0	0	0	0	0
(England)	DF	David Cowan	0	0	0	0	0	0	0	0	0	0
(Slovakia)	DF	Maroš Klimpl	3	0	0	0	1	0	0	0	4	0
(Scotland)	DF	Jim Lauchlan	7	0	0	0	0	0	1	0	8	0
(Scotland)	DF	Gary MacKenzie	5	1	1	0	0	0	1	0	7	1
(Scotland)	DF	Robert Malcolm	3	0	0	0	0	0	0	0	3	0
(Scotland)	DF	Eddie Malone	6	0	0	0	1	0	0	0	7	0
(Scotland)	DF	Craig McKeown	1	0	0	0	0	0	0	0	1	0
(Scotland)	DF	Ryan O'Leary	2	0	0	0	0	0	0	0	2	0
(Scotland)	DF	Eric Paton	5	1	0	0	0	0	0	0	5	1
(Scotland)	DF	Connor Rennie	0	0	0	0	0	0	0	0	0	0
(Scotland)	MF	Colin Cameron	1	0	0	0	0	0	0	0	1	0
(Scotland)	MF	Craig Forsyth	2	0	0	0	0	0	0	0	2	0
(Scotland)	MF	Gary Harkins	3	1	0	0	0	0	0	0	3	1
(Scotland)	MF	Richie Hart	4	0	0	0	0	0	0	0	4	0
(Scotland)	MF	Brian Kerr	2	0	0	0	0	0	1	0	3	0
(Scotland)	MF	Paul McHale	1	0	0	0	0	0	0	0	1	0
(Scotland)	MF	Andrew Shinnie	0	0	0	0	0	0	0	0	0	0
(Scotland)	MF	Jordan Timmons	0	0	0	0	0	0	0	0	0	0
(Scotland)	MF	Darren Young	1	0	0	0	0	0	0	0	1	0
(Guadeloupe)	FW	Mickaël Antoine-Curier	0	0	0	0	0	0	0	0	0	0
(Scotland)	FW	Pat Clarke	2	0	0	0	0	0	0	0	2	0
(Scotland)	FW	Leigh Griffiths	6	0	1	0	0	0	0	0	7	0
(Scotland)	FW	Sean Higgins	2	0	0	0	0	0	0	0	2	0
(England)	FW	Ben Hutchinson	1	0	0	0	0	0	0	0	1	0
(Scotland)	FW	Colin McMenamin	3	0	0	0	0	0	0	0	3	0

=== Top scorers ===
Last updated on 10 December 2011

Position	Nation	Name	League	Scottish Cup	League Cup	Challenge Cup	Total
1	(Scotland)	Leigh Griffiths	13	1	4	3	21
2	(Scotland)	Gary Harkins	15	1	1	2	19
3	(Scotland)	Colin McMenamin	7	0	1	0	8
4	(Scotland)	Sean Higgins	5	0	1	1	7
5	(Scotland)	Craig Forsyth	2	1	1	2	6
6	(Guadeloupe)	Mickaël Antoine-Curier	0	0	2	1	3
=	(England)	Ben Hutchinson	1	1	1	0	3
8	(Scotland)	Pat Clarke	1	0	0	1	2
=	(Scotland)	Eddie Malone	1	0	1	0	1
10	(Scotland)	Colin Cameron	0	0	1	0	1
=	(Scotland)	Brian Kerr	1	0	0	0	1
=	(Scotland)	Gary MacKenzie	1	0	0	0	1
=	(Scotland)	Eric Paton	1	0	0	0	1

=== Clean sheets ===
R	Pos	Nat	Name	League	Scottish Cup	League Cup	Challenge Cup	Total
1	GK	(England)	Tony Bullock	7	–	1	2	10
2	GK	(Scotland)	Robert Douglas	4	0	0	0	4
3	GK	(Scotland)	Derek Soutar	1	1	–	–	2
4	GK	(Scotland)	Bobby Geddes	0	–	–	–	0
			Totals	12	1	1	2	16

Last updated: 10 December 2011
Source: Match reports in Competitive matches

== Team statistics ==
=== Division table ===
Pos	Team	Pld	W	D	L	GF	GA	GD	Pts	Promotion, qualification or relegation
1	Inverness Caledonian Thistle (C, P)	36	21	10	5	72	32	+40	73	Promotion to the Premier League
2	Dundee	36	16	13	7	48	34	+14	61	
3	Dunfermline Athletic	36	17	7	12	54	44	+10	58	
4	Queen of the South	36	15	11	10	53	40	+13	56	
5	Ross County	36	15	11	10	46	44	+2	56	

Source: Scottish Football League
Rules for classification: 1) points; 2) goal difference; 3) number of goals scored.
First Division play-offs: The 9th place team will be entered into a play-off with the 2nd, 3rd and 4th places of the Second Division. The winner gets a place in the 2010-11 First Division
(C) Champions; (P) Promoted

=== Division summary ===
Round	1	2	3	4	5	6	7	8	9	10	11	12	13	14	15	16	17	18	19	20	21	22	23	24	25	26	27	28	29	30	31	32	33	34	35	36
Ground	H	A	H	A	H	A	H	H	A	A	H	A	H	H	A	A	H	H	A	H	H	A	H	H	H	A	A	H	A	A	H	A	A	A	H	A
Result	W	D	D	D	W	L	W	W	D	W	W	D	W	D	W	W	W	W	D	L	W	D	L	W	D	D	L	D	D	L	W	W	D	L	W	L
Position	2	1	2	4	3	6	5	5	3	2	1	2	2	2	1	1	1	1	1	1	1	1	1	1	1	1	1	1	2	2	2	2	2	2	2	2

Source: Statto.com
A = Away; H = Home; W = Win; D = Draw; L = Loss

=== Match stats ===
	Scottish First Division	Scottish Cup	League Cup	Challenge Cup
Games played	36	3	4	4
Games won	16	2	3	4
Games drawn	13	0	0	0
Games lost	7	1	1	0
Goals for	48	4	13	11
Goals against	34	3	7	3
Players used	28	20	22	22
Yellow cards	64	2	2	3
Red cards	4	0	0	0

Last updated: 10 December 2011
Source: Competitive matches

=== Results summary ===
Overall								Home						Away					
Pld	W	D	L	GF	GA	GD	Pts	W	D	L	GF	GA	GD	W	D	L	GF	GA	GD
36	16	13	7	48	34	+14	61	12	4	2	30	13	+17	4	9	5	18	21	−3

Last updated: 10 December 2011.
Source: Competitive matches

=== Results by opponent ===
Last updated on 10 December 2011

Team	League Results^{[a]}				Points
Team	1	2	3	4	Points
Airdrie United	1–1	2–1	0–1	0–3	4
Ayr United	2–2	3–1	1–1	3–0	8
Dunfermline Athletic	1–0	1–1	3–2	1–2	7
Greenock Morton	1–0	1–0	3–1	2–2	10
Inverness Caledonian Thistle	2–2	1–1	2–2	0–1	3
Partick Thistle	2–0	2–0	1–0	1–0	12
Queen of the South	0–1	0–0	1–1	1–1	3
Raith Rovers	2–2	2–1	0–1	2–0	7
Ross County	2–0	1–0	0–1	1–1	7

Source: 2009–10 Scottish First Division Results Table

a. Dundee's score is shown first.

== Transfers ==
=== Transfers Summer ===
==== Players in ====
Player	From	Fee
(England) Tony Bullock	(Scotland) Montrose	Free
(Scotland) Richie Hart	(Scotland) Ross County	Free
(Scotland) Sean Higgins	(Scotland) Ross County	Free
(Scotland) Pat Clarke	(Scotland) Clyde	Free
(Northern Ireland) Chris Casement	(England) Ipswich Town	Free
(Scotland) Brian Kerr	(Scotland) Inverness Caledonian Thistle	Free
(Scotland) Derek Soutar	(Scotland) Ross County	Free
(Slovakia) Maroš Klimpl	(Denmark) Midtjylland	Free
(Scotland) Leigh Griffiths	(Scotland) Livingston	£125,000
(Scotland) Gary Harkins	(Scotland) Partick Thistle	£150,000

==== Players out ====
Player	To	Fee
(France) Ludovic Roy	(Scotland) Queen of the South	Free
(England) Darren Williams	(England) Gateshead	Free
(Scotland) David O'Brien	(Scotland) Ayr United	Free
(Canada) Chris Pozniak	(Canada) Vancouver Whitecaps	Free
(Scotland) Laurie Spence	(Scotland) East Stirlingshire	Free
(Scotland) Mark Gilhaney	(Scotland) Alloa Athletic	Free
(Scotland) John Gibson	(Scotland) Elgin City	Loan
(France) Frédéric Daquin	Free agent	Free
(Scotland) Robert Davidson	Free agent	Free
(Scotland) Bryan Deasley	(Scotland) Forfar Athletic	Loan
(Guadeloupe) Mickaël Antoine-Curier	(Scotland) Hamilton Academical	Loan

=== Transfers Winter ===
==== Players in ====
Player	To	Fee
(Scotland) Robert Malcolm	(Australia) Brisbane Roar	Free
(Scotland) Andrew Shinnie	(Scotland) Rangers	Loan
(England) Ben Hutchinson	(Scotland) Celtic	Loan
(Scotland) Ryan O'Leary	(Scotland) Kilmarnock	Loan

==== Players out ====
Player	To	Fee
(Scotland) Craig McKeown	(Scotland) Stirling Albion	Loan
(Northern Ireland) Chris Casement	(Northern Ireland) Linfield F.C.	Loan

== See also ==
- List of Dundee F.C. seasons
