= 2008–09 Dundee F.C. season =

Dundee
2008–09 season
- Manager: Alex Rae (until 20 October); David Farrell (interim); Jocky Scott (from 30 October)
- Stadium: Dens Park
- Scottish First Division: 4th
- Scottish Cup: Third round
- Scottish League Cup: Second round
- Scottish Challenge Cup: First round
- Top goalscorer: League: Antoine-Curier (14); All: Antoine-Curier (15)
- Highest home attendance: 6,537 (vs St Johnstone, 29 November 2008) (SFD)
- Lowest home attendance: 2,507 (vs Partick Thistle, 26 August 2008) (SLC)
- Average home league attendance: 3,955
Home colours

The 2008–09 season saw Dundee compete in the Scottish First Division after coming 2nd place the season prior. Dundee finished in 4th position with 50 points.

== Final league table ==
Pos	Team	Pld	W	D	L	GF	GA	GD	Pts
2	Partick Thistle	36	16	7	13	39	35	+4	55
3	Dunfermline Athletic	36	14	9	13	51	43	+8	51
4	Dundee	36	13	11	12	33	32	+1	50
5	Queen of the South	36	12	11	13	57	50	+7	47
6	Greenock Morton	36	12	11	13	40	40	0	47

Source: BBC Sport
Rules for classification: 1) points; 2) goal difference; 3) number of goals scored.

== Results ==
Dundee's score comes first

=== Legend ===
Win	Draw	Loss

=== Scottish First Division ===
Match	Date	Opponent	Venue	Result	Attendance	Scorers
1	2 August 2008	Ross County	A	2–1	3,444	Antoine-Curier 34' (pen), Paton 50'
2	9 August 2008	Clyde	H	1–0	4,042	Antoine-Curier 44'
3	16 August 2008	Airdrie United	A	0–0	1,787	
4	23 August 2008	Greenock Morton	H	1–0	4,032	Paton 28'
5	30 August 2008	Queen of the South	A	1–3	2,646	Pozniak 14'
6	13 September 2008	Dunfermline Athletic	H	0–0	4,259	
7	20 September 2008	Livingston	H	0–3	3,631	
8	27 September 2008	St Johnstone	A	0–2	4,307	
9	4 October 2008	Partick Thistle	A	0–0	2,556	
10	18 October 2008	Ross County	H	1–2	3,228	Antoine-Curier 58'
11	25 October 2008	Greenock Morton	A	0–2	1,741	
12	1 November 2008	Airdrie United	H	1–1	3,456	Antoine-Curier 66'
13	8 November 2008	Dunfermline Athletic	A	1–0	3,506	Antoine-Curier 68'
14	15 November 2008	Queen of the South	H	2–0	3,630	Paton 64', Deasley 79'
16	29 November 2008	St Johnstone	H	1–1	6,537	Antoine-Curier 74'
17	13 December 2008	Clyde	A	0–1	1,176	Young (red card) 86'
18	20 December 2008	Partick Thistle	H	0–0	3,569	
19	27 December 2008	Queen of the South	A	1–0	2,616	McMenamin 30'
20	3 January 2009	Dunfermline Athletic	H	1–0	5,033	Paton 67'
21	17 January 2009	Greenock Morton	H	0–0	3,736	
15	24 January 2009	Airdrie United	A	0–1	1,303	
22	31 January 2009	Clyde	H	2–1	3,217	McMenamin 39', Antoine-Curier 42'
23	7 February 2009	Livingston	A	2–1	1,535	Antoine-Curier 1', Efrem 33'
24	21 February 2009	Livingston	H	4–1	3,679	Shinnie 48', Efrem 55', Antoine-Curier (2) 68', 79'
25	28 February 2009	St Johnstone	A	0–0	7,238	
26	10 March 2009	Queen of the South	H	2–3	3,757	Antoine-Curier (2) 55', 69'
27	14 March 2009	Ross County	H	2–0	3,381	McMenamin 32', Antoine-Curier 45' (pen)
28	22 March 2009	Partick Thistle	A	1–1	3,303	McMenamin 37'
29	28 March 2009	Ross County	A	1–1	2,296	Antoine-Curier 66', McHale (red card) 85', MacKenzie (red card) 89'
31	31 March 2009	Dunfermline Athletic	A	1–1	2,382	Malone 61'
30	4 April 2009	Greenock Morton	A	0–2	2,133	
33	11 April 2009	Airdrie United	H	0–1	2,870	
32	18 April 2009	Livingston	A	1–0	1,208	Young 61', MacKenzie (red card) 88'
34	25 April 2009	St Johnstone	H	0–1	6,305	
35	2 May 2009	Clyde	A	0–2	944	
36	9 May 2009	Partick Thistle	H	4–0	2,831	Young 1', McMenamin (3) 34', 69', 74'

=== Scottish Cup ===
Match	Date	Opponent	Venue	Result	Attendance	Scorers
R3	10 January 2009	Celtic	A	1–2	23,070	

=== Scottish League Cup ===
Match	Date	Opponent	Venue	Result	Attendance	Scorers
R2	26 August 2008	Partick Thistle	H	1–2	2,507	McHale 80'

=== Scottish Challenge Cup ===
Match	Date	Opponent	Venue	Result	Attendance	Scorers
R1	26 July 2008	Alloa Athletic	A	1–2	783	Antoine-Curier 88'
