= 2009 Scottish Challenge Cup final =

- Event: 2009–10 Scottish Challenge Cup
Dundee	Inverness CT
3	2
- Date: 22 November 2009
- Venue: McDiarmid Park, Perth
- Referee: Charlie Richmond
- Attendance: 8,031

The 2009 Scottish Challenge Cup final was played on 22 November 2009 at McDiarmid Park in Perth and was the 19th Scottish Challenge Cup final. The final was contested by Dundee and Inverness CT. Dundee won the match 3–2.

== Route to the final ==
=== Dundee ===
Round	Opposition	Score
Second round	Cowdenbeath (a)	3–0
Quarter-final	Stirling Albion (a)	2–1
Semi-final	Annan Athletic (h)	3–0

=== Inverness Caledonian Thistle ===
Round	Opposition	Score
First round	Montrose (h)	1–1 (a.e.t.) (5–3 pens.)
Second round	Stranraer (h)	3–0
Quarter-final	Partick Thistle (a)	1–1 (a.e.t.) (4–3 pens.)
Semi-final	Ross County (h)	1–0

== Match details ==
22 November 2009
15:00

Dundee	3 – 2	Inverness CT
Bulvītis 48' (o.g.); Harkins 53'; Forsyth 83'	Report	Rooney 20'; Bulvītis 33'

McDiarmid Park, Perth
Attendance: 8,031
Referee: Charlie Richmond

Dundee	Inverness CT

Dundee:
GK	1	(Scotland) Robert Douglas
RB	2	(Scotland) Eric Paton		(substituted off) 73'
CB	6	(Scotland) Jim Lauchlan	(yellow card) 88'
CB	5	(Scotland) Gary MacKenzie
LB	3	(Scotland) Eddie Malone
RM	8	(Scotland) Richie Hart
CM	4	(Scotland) Brian Kerr	(yellow card) 88'
CM	11	(Scotland) Gary Harkins
LM	7	(Scotland) Craig Forsyth
CF	10	(Scotland) Sean Higgins		(substituted off) 65'
CF	9	(Scotland) Leigh Griffiths		(substituted off) 90'
Substitutes:
DF	12	(Scotland) Kyle Benedictus		(substituted in) 73'
FW	14	(Scotland) Pat Clarke		(substituted in) 90'
MF	15	(Scotland) Colin Cameron
GK	16	(Scotland) Derek Soutar
FW	18	(Scotland) Colin McMenamin		(substituted in) 65'
Manager:
(Scotland) Jocky Scott

Inverness CT:
GK	1	(Scotland) Ryan Esson
RB	2	(Scotland) Ross Tokely
CB	5	(Scotland) Stuart Golabek
CB	6	(Scotland) David Proctor
LB	3	(Latvia) Nauris Bulvītis	(yellow card) 88'
RM	7	(Spain) Dani Sánchez		(substituted off) 57'
CM	4	(Scotland) Grant Munro
CM	8	(Scotland) Russell Duncan		(substituted off) 89'
LM	11	(Republic of Ireland) Jonathan Hayes	(yellow card) 88'
CF	9	(Republic of Ireland) Richie Foran
CF	10	(Republic of Ireland) Adam Rooney		(substituted off) 89'
Substitutes:
GK	12	(Scotland) Kyle Allison
MF	14	(England) Lee Cox		(substituted in) 57'
FW	15	(Scotland) Dougie Imrie	(red card) 90'	(substituted in) 89'
FW	16	(England) Eric Odhiambo		(substituted in) 89'
FW	17	(England) Dan Stratford
Manager:
(England) Terry Butcher

MATCH RULES

- 90 minutes
- 30 minutes of extra-time if necessary
- Penalty shoot-out if scores still level
- Five named substitutes
- Maximum of 3 substitutions
