= Rab Douglas =

Scottish footballer

Personal information
- Full name: Robert James Douglas
- Date of birth: 24 April 1972 (age 54)
- Place of birth: Lanark, Scotland
- Height: 1.91 m (6 ft 3 in)
- Position: Goalkeeper

Senior career*
| Years | Team | Apps | (Gls) |
| 1990–1992 | Forth Wanderers | | |
| 1992–1995 | Meadowbank Thistle | 72 | (0) |
| 1995–1997 | → Livingston | | |
| 1997–2000 | Dundee | 119 | (0) |
| 2000–2005 | Celtic | 108 | (0) |
| 2005–2008 | Leicester City | 32 | (0) |
| 2007 | → Millwall (loan) | 7 | (0) |
| 2007 | → Wycombe Wanderers (loan) | 1 | (0) |
| 2008 | → Wycombe Wanderers (loan) | 2 | (0) |
| 2008 | → Plymouth Argyle (loan) | 1 | (0) |
| 2008–2013 | Dundee | 152 | (0) |
| 2013–2015 | Forfar Athletic | 67 | (0) |
| 2016–2023 | Arbroath | 1 | (0) |
| Total | | 490 | (0) |

International career
| 2002–2005 | Scotland | 19 | (0) |
- * Club domestic league appearances and goals

Robert James "Rab" Douglas (born 24 April 1972) is a Scottish former professional footballer who played as a goalkeeper. He played for several clubs, including Livingston, Dundee, Celtic, Leicester City, Forfar Athletic and was a goalkeeping coach with Arbroath. Douglas was part of the Celtic side that reached the 2003 UEFA Cup Final, under the management of Martin O'Neill. He also represented Scotland at international level, playing 19 times between 2002 and 2005. In 2017, Douglas was inducted into the Dundee FC Hall of Fame.

== Club career ==
=== Meadowbank Thistle and Livingston ===
Douglas was born in Lanark. He began his professional career in 1993 when he signed for Scottish Second Division side Meadowbank Thistle. Meadowbank Thistle were relegated to the Third Division at the end of 1993–94, and in 1995 relocated to Livingston and changed their name accordingly. By this time, Douglas had become their first-choice goalkeeper. The re-branded club had a successful first season and won promotion to the Second Division.

=== Dundee ===
In the summer of 1997, Scottish First Division side Dundee signed Douglas. He was an ever-present in the side as Dundee won the 1997–98 Scottish First Division and gained promotion to the Scottish Premier League. Dundee also had a good run in the 1997–98 Scottish Cup, and Douglas kept a clean sheet in the quarter-final tie at Ibrox as Dundee held Rangers to a 0–0 draw. Dundee, however, lost the replay 2–0. In November 1999 he saved a Jörg Albertz penalty as Dundee won 2–1 against Rangers at Ibrox. He continued as Dundee's first-choice goalkeeper into season 2000–01.

=== Celtic ===
Douglas joined Celtic from Dundee in 2000 and soon became first-choice goalkeeper at the club, displacing Jonathan Gould. He won the Scottish Premier League (SPL) title and the Scottish Cup in his first season at the club, but was cup-tied for their victorious 2000–01 Scottish League Cup campaign. The following season saw Douglas win a second SPL title. He also won praise for an outstanding performance against Valencia in the away leg of a UEFA Cup tie during November 2001, and won the SPL Player of the Month Award that same month.

He was a member of the team that reached the 2003 UEFA Cup Final against F.C. Porto, playing well in the games leading up the final, but considered culpable by many fans for at least one of Porto's goals in Seville. Douglas' form was generally good at Celtic, but he had the misfortune of conceding 'soft' goals in high-profile games, notably in the 3–3 draw against Rangers in October 2002 where he was badly at fault for Rangers first goal and considered to be at fault for their third also.

During the 2003–04 and 2004–05 seasons he faced stiff competition from Swedish international Magnus Hedman and youngster David Marshall. He missed the 2004 Scottish Cup Final through injury. Another high-profile blunder against Rangers in 2005 led to increased speculation about his future. At the end of the season, Douglas was told by manager Martin O'Neill that he would not be first choice for next season. Douglas decided that he wanted to test himself in England, rather than sit on the bench, and joined Leicester City on a free transfer.

=== Leicester City ===
His future at the Walkers Stadium was under threat after being replaced late in the 2005–06 season by Paul Henderson and promising performances by former youth academy goalkeeper Conrad Logan. Therefore, on 7 June 2007, Douglas was placed on the transfer list alongside Mark de Vries and Alan Maybury. Douglas was linked with newly promoted Scottish Premier League side Gretna before handed a trial spell at Motherwell (his boyhood club) on 21 August, but was unable to agree a deal with the club. The move was soon closed, but failed to do so on the last day of the transfer window.

On 14 September 2007, Douglas joined Millwall on an emergency four-week loan, making his debut in a 2–1 defeat to Walsall on 15 September. On 23 October, he joined Wycombe Wanderers on a three-month loan deal, making three appearances. At the first, the loan spell was for three months, before it's changed to the end of the season. Having made two appearances, Douglas loan spell ended over personal reasons on 12 December 2007.

On 14 March 2008, Douglas joined Plymouth Argyle on a week's emergency loan as cover for the suspended Luke McCormick, making his only appearance in a 2–1 away win over Bristol City on 15 March 2008. On 15 May, he was released by Leicester as his contract was close to expiring and later joined former club Dundee on a free transfer.

=== Dundee ===
Douglas joined Dundee, for the second time of his career, in 2008. He played against his former club, Celtic, in the fourth round of the 2008–09 Scottish Cup. The match finished with Dundee losing 2–1. A week later, Douglas signed a two-year contract extension. In his first season, Douglas started every single game of the 2008/09 season and played the full 90 minutes of every game, except from the last game of season when Ludovic Roy came on as a farewell substitution.

At the start of 2009–10 season, Douglas was linked a move back to England under compatriot and former teammate, Paul Lambert, now manager of Colchester United. This led to manager Jocky Scott giving a warning to Lambert that he was not for sale. During the season Douglas made sixteen appearances, mainly due to injuries, like calf and knee complaints. Despite the injuries, the club would win the final of the Scottish Challenge Cup against Inverness Caledonian Thistle, with Douglas in goal for the final.

In the 2010–11 season, Douglas made 34 appearances. During the season, the club entered administration and Douglas, along with Matt Lockwood, would help-out new manager Barry Smith. During the club's administration, Douglas helped the club to a 23 match undefeated streak beating the previous record set by the team and not only escaping relegation, but also exit administration at the end of the season. Following this, Douglas signed a one-year deal with the club.

Douglas started every single game of the 2011–12 season and with the exception of a sending off against Partick Thistle, in a 1–0 loss on 29 October 2011 he played the full 90 minutes of all the games. His sending off was incorrect after referee Steven McLean judged Douglas to have swiped Chris Erskine's feet, though he claims that Lockwood shoved him to the ground. The club appealed against his sending-off and the SFA overturned the suspension, claiming the referee harshly treated Douglas.

The club would finish in second place that season, but advanced to the Scottish Premier League to replace Rangers. Douglas played his first SPL match, in over seven years, in a 0–0 draw against Kilmarnock on the opening game of the season. Despite back to back losses, Manager Smith would praised his performance for his saves, including a penalty save, in a 1–0 victory against Heart of Midlothian, which would give Dundee their first win of the season and against his former club, despite losing 2–0. Douglas made thirty appearances until in mid-March and his future at Dens Park was under threat after being replaced late in the 2012–13 season by Steve Simonsen and a fall out with new manager John Brown, though Brown claimed that injuries were the main factor in why Douglas was dropped. This led to speculation that Douglas' time at Dens Park was on the verge of ending. On 8 May 2013, with the club now relegated to the First Division, it was announced that Douglas would not be offered a new contract. On 13 May 2013, at half-time in a match between Dundee and Kilmarnock, Douglas was given standing ovation from the fans during an emotional lap of honour.

Following his departure, Douglas' feud with Brown continued when his former manager urged other club's not to sign him, claiming he was a "disrespectful liar". This led Douglas threaten a legal action against Brown.

=== Forfar Athletic ===
On 25 July 2013, Douglas joined Scottish League One side Forfar Athletic on a one-year deal. Douglas was on the bench when Forfar Athletic beat Rangers 2–1 on 3 August 2013, in the first round of the Scottish League Cup, a match that Forfar claimed was arguably the biggest result in their history. On 8 September 2013, Douglas returned for Celtic to play one match as keeper in Celtic's charity match in honour of Stiliyan Petrov. Douglas took over in goal for the Loons at the start of November after injury ruled usual first choice Darren Hill out for a few weeks. Douglass would go on to be named in the 2014–2015 PFA League 1 Team of the Year. Douglas played a crucial role in Forfar's promotion challenge in the 14/15 season as they made it into the championship play off final defeating Alloa 3–1 in the first leg but eventually crashing out in a 3–0 defeat in the second leg, the second goal of which Douglas gave the ball away to Liam Buchanan following a miscommunication with Darren Dods for him to strike into a near enough open net. Following the sacking of manager Dick Campbell in December 2015, Douglas quit the Station Park side in protest.

=== Arbroath ===
After almost a year without a club, Douglas signed for Scottish League Two side Arbroath, joining up with once again Dick Campbell who was his manager previously whilst at Forfar Athletic. At the end of his short-term contract, Douglas left the club on 20 January 2017. Douglas subsequently re-signed for Arbroath at the end of March 2017, after on loan goalkeeper Cammy Gill was recalled by his parent club, Dunfermline Athletic. Douglas left the club for the second time at the end of the 2016–17 season. He rejoined the Lichties soon after however, making his return to football in a victory against Queen's Park in November 2017, departing the club at the end of the 2017–18 season.

After assisting Arbroath in goalkeeper coaching duties during his previous spell, Douglas was hired as the team's goalkeeping coach in 2018. Douglas would assist the Lichties in winning League One in 2018–19. In 2020, after numerous injuries and suspensions depleted Arbroath prior to their League Cup match against Dunfermline Athletic, the 48-year old Douglas appeared as a substitute for the Lichties, though did not make an appearance. In January 2023 Douglas, now aged 50, would again be an unused substitute for Arbroath in January 2023 in their Scottish Cup match against Motherwell.

== International career ==
Douglas was a regular for Scotland during the UEFA Euro 2004 qualification campaign. After a 6–0 loss to the Netherlands in Amsterdam in the qualifying playoff, Douglas lost his position as first team goalkeeper. It was a night from which his Scotland career never really recovered and he played just once more under Berti Vogts, against Wales, in a 4–0 defeat.

Douglas was recalled to the Scotland squad in 2005 by Walter Smith for a 2006 FIFA World Cup qualifier against Italy, but he had to be substituted in the 38th minute due to injury. His last appearance for Scotland was a friendly match in August 2005, where he came on as a second-half substitute in a 2–2 draw against Austria.

In all he played 19 times for Scotland.

== Personal life ==
Douglas was declared bankrupt in January 2017 and became a sports columnist for newspaper The Courier.

== Honours ==
Livingston

- Scottish Football League Third Division: 1995–96

Dundee

- Scottish Football League First Division: 1997–98
- Scottish Challenge Cup: 2009–10

Celtic

- Scottish Premier League: 2000–01, 2001–02, 2003–04
- Scottish Cup: 2000–01, 2003–04, 2004–05
- UEFA Cup runner-up: 2002–03
