= Craig Forsyth =

Scottish footballer (born 1989)

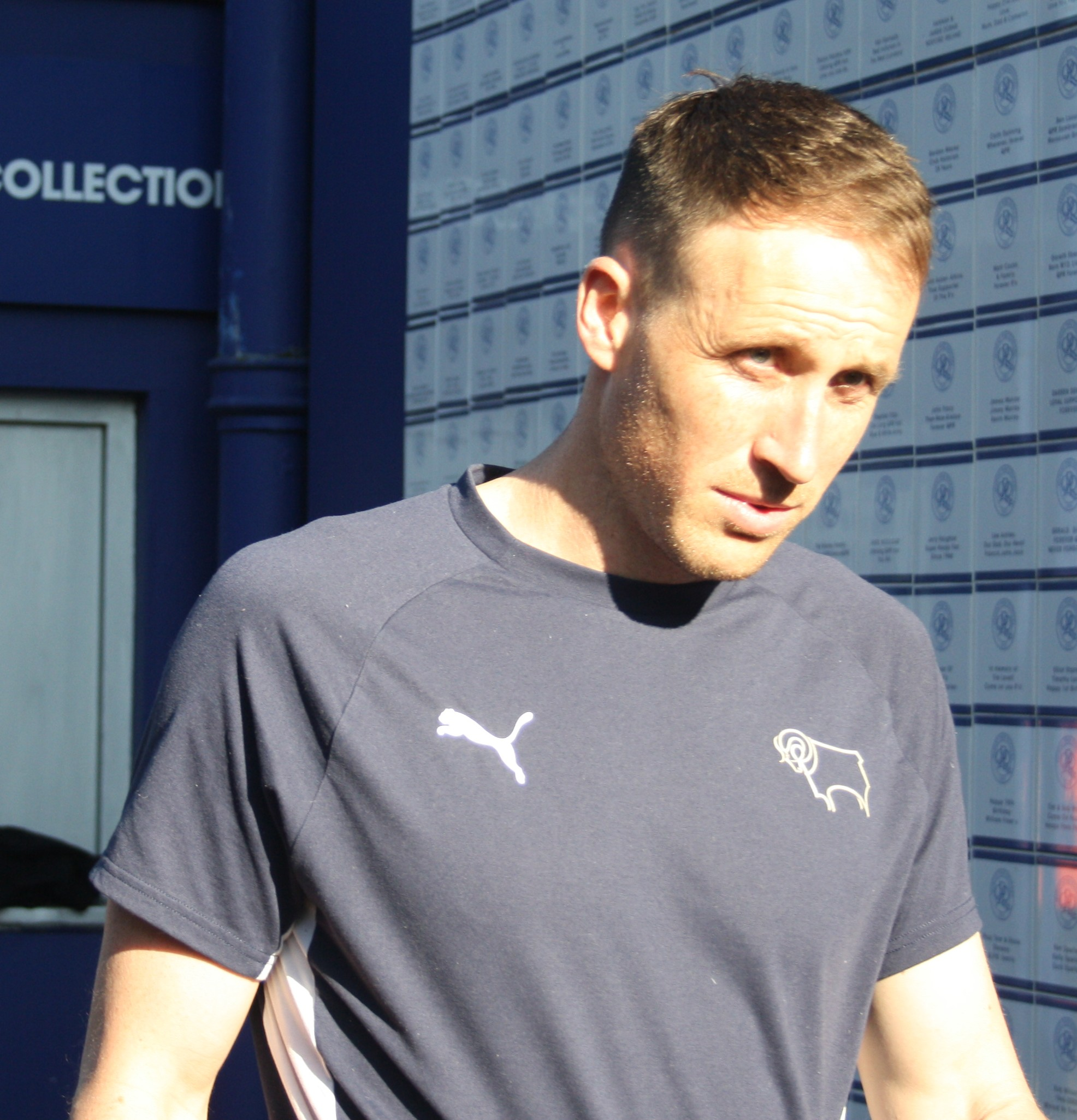
- Forsyth in 2026

Personal information
- Full name: Craig Forsyth
- Date of birth: 24 February 1989 (age 37)
- Place of birth: Carnoustie, Angus, Scotland
- Height: 1.89 m (6 ft 2 in)
- Positions: Left back; centre back; left midfielder

Team information
- Current team: Derby County
- Number: 3

Youth career
- –2006: Carlogie Boys Club

Senior career*
Years	Team	Apps	(Gls)
2006–2011	Dundee	59	(10)
2008	→ Montrose (loan)	9	(0)
2008–2009	→ Arbroath (loan)	26	(2)
2011–2013	Watford	24	(3)
2012	→ Bradford City (loan)	7	(0)
2013	→ Derby County (loan)	10	(0)
2013–	Derby County	344	(14)

International career^{‡}
2014–2015	Scotland	4	(0)
- * Club domestic league appearances and goals as of 07:05, 2 September 2026 (UTC) ‡ National team caps and goals as of 21:40, 15 October 2015 (UTC)

Craig Forsyth (born 24 February 1989) is a Scottish professional footballer who plays as a left-sided defender for EFL Championship club Derby County.

He previously played for Dundee before joining Watford in 2011, before joining Derby County in 2013. He has also had loan spells at Montrose, Arbroath, Bradford City and Derby County. Forsyth has also received 4 international caps by Scotland.

== Club career ==
=== Dundee ===
Forsyth began his career with Carlogie Boys Club before joining First Division side Dundee in 2006. He was given his debut by manager Alex Rae at the age of 17 in a 3–2 win at Livingston on 11 November 2006. He joined Third Division club Montrose on loan in February 2008 until the end of the season. He made nine league appearances for Montrose and one in the play-offs. The following season, Forsyth was loaned out to Arbroath. He scored his first senior goal in a 1–0 win at Brechin City on 28 March 2009.

Having scored two goals in 26 league appearances for Arbroath, Forsyth returned to Dundee and established himself in the club's first team under the management of Jocky Scott. Having scored his first goal for the club in a 3–2 League Cup win against Aberdeen, Forsyth managed five more goals during the 2009–10 season, including the winner against Inverness Caledonian Thistle in the Challenge Cup Final. He helped Dundee finish sixth in the First Division the following season, despite the club being docked 25 points for entering administration. Forsyth made 33 league appearances and scored eight goals, including a brace in a 3–2 win against Partick Thistle on 30 April 2011.

=== Watford ===
In June 2011, Forsyth joined Watford for an undisclosed compensation fee, and signed a three-year contract. He scored on his debut against Burnley on the first day of the season.

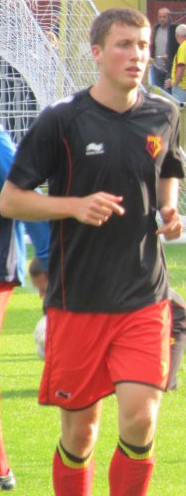
Forsyth with Watford in 2012

==== Bradford City (loan) ====
On 19 October 2012, Forsyth joined Bradford City on a two-month loan deal. He made his debut the following day, helping the team to a 3–1 win at home to Cheltenham Town. He scored his first goal for the club on 4 December, completing a 2–0 win against Port Vale in the Football League Trophy.

==== Derby County (loan) ====
On 4 March 2013, Forsyth joined Derby County on loan, ahead of their match against Cardiff City the following day, subject to clearance from The Football League. Forsyth started against Cardiff City, before being replaced at 71 minutes in the 1–1 draw. Forsyth started as a makeshift left-back in his third game for Derby County against Leicester City on 16 March 2013, assisting Derby's second goal which was scored by fellow loanee Chris Martin in a 2–1 victory. Forsyth was recalled by Watford on 29 April 2013, a game before the end of the regular season. He played 10 times for Derby during his loan spell.

=== Derby County ===
On 1 July 2013, Forsyth joined Derby County from Watford on a three-year contract for a reported fee of £150,000. Forsyth went into the 2013–14 season as first choice left back, with Clough stating Forsyth was also considered as an option at centre back in case of injuries and suspensions. Forsyth started the opening game a 1–1 draw at home to Blackburn Rovers, his first game as a permanent player.

On 27 June 2014, Forsyth extended his contract at Derby County as he signed a new four-year contract to stay at the club until the end of the 2017–18 season. Forsyth suffered a cruciate knee ligament injury in November 2015, which kept him sidelined for nine months. On 22 August 2016, he suffered yet another serious injury, he did not return to action for another 12 months, after which he signed a contract extension in December 2017 until June 2020.

On 10 November 2018, Forsyth suffered his third serious knee ligament injury during his Derby career, ruling him out of action for 379 days. He then had competition for the left back role in the form of academy graduates Max Lowe and Lee Buchanan during the 2019–20 season, he made 25 appearances during this season as his contract was extended until June 2022. In June 2020, Forsyth made his 200th appearance for Derby County.

Lowe departed in August 2020, and Buchanan and Forsyth competed for the left-back role at the club, Forsyth played 21 times during the 2020–21 season. Then he played 29 times, scoring 3 times during the 2021–22 season in a season Derby were relegated to League One after being deducted 21 points due to financial issues, Forsyth's second season playing for a club under administration.

On 27 July 2022, Forsyth signed a new one-year deal with the club that would take his time with the Rams to ten years. Under new manager Paul Warne Forsyth was regularly used as central defender. On 18 March 2023, Forsyth made his 300th appearance for the club against Fleetwood Town, becoming the 30th player in Derby County history to do so.

On 10 May 2023, after impressing in his new role at centre back and making 52 appearances during the 2022–23 season as Derby narrowly missed out on a play-off place, Forsyth was rewarded with a new contract until June 2024. This extended his stay into an eleventh year, during which he was given a testimonial match. It was played against Stoke City during the 2023–24 pre-season on 22 July 2023 at Pride Park. Derby won the game 3–0, which featured guest appearances from former teammates Martyn Waghorn, Craig Bryson, Bradley Johnson and David Nugent (Waghorn later signed again for the club). The game had an attendance of 9,119 fans.

On 5 August 2023, Forsyth scored an equalising goal in Derby's first League One game of the season against Wigan Athletic, although Derby went on to lose the game 2–1. Forsyth scored in wins over Barnsley on 11 November 2023 and Oxford United on 29 December 2023. He started in 24 of Derby's first 25 League One matches of the season, but that run of starts was ended when he sustained a calf muscle injury at Fleetwood Town on 6 January 2024. Paul Warne said that Forsyth would be out of the "foreseeable" with the injury. Forsyth returned to action on 12 March 2024, after two months on the sidelines, but suffered another calf injury later on in March. He was unable to make a return to action that season, when Derby won automatic promotion to the Championship. Forsyth made 32 appearances for Derby with three goals during 2023–24.

On 18 May 2024, it was announced that Forsyth had trigged a one-year performance-based clause to extend his contract at Derby until June 2025, the 2024–25 season will be his 13th at the club. On 28 September 2024, Forsyth made his 300th league appearance for Derby, in a 3–2 loss to Norwich City, Forsyth had involvements in both Derby goals in the match with a goal and an assist. Forsyth would find himself managed by former teammate John Eustace later in the 2024–25 season, scoring in Eustace's first win as head coach. After injury to Callum Elder, Forsyth played at left-wing back under Eustace and with key goals and assists, he helped Derby retain their Championship status. Forsyth played 42 times for Derby during the season, scoring three times.

In May 2025, Derby County confirmed that Forsyth was in talks with Derby to extend his contract which expired in June 2025. On 23 June 2025, it was announced the Forsyth had signed a two-year extension to his Derby County contract until the end of the 2026–27 season, which would upon expiry of his new deal ensured he spent 15 seasons at Pride Park. He would also be working towards his UEFA coaching licences to transition into a possible coaching role after his playing career had concluded. On 24 February 2026, Forsyth scored on his 37th birthday; in a 4–2 loss to Hull City. On 11 April 2026, Forsyth made his 400th appearance for Derby County in a match at Southampton, becoming the 15th player in club history to do so. Forsyth made 22 appearances during the 2025–26 season, scoring once.

== International career ==
Forsyth was capped four times by Scotland from 2014 to 2015. Three of his four caps came in friendly matches, against Nigeria, Northern Ireland and Qatar. His last appearance for Scotland was in a UEFA Euro 2016 qualifying match against the Republic of Ireland.

== Career statistics ==
=== Club ===
As of match played 1 September 2026

Appearances and goals by club, season and competition
Club	Season	League			National cup (Note: Includes Scottish Cup, FA Cup)		League cup (Note: Includes Scottish League Cup, EFL Cup)		Other (Note: Includes Scottish Challenge Cup, Scottish Second Division Play-offs, English Football League play-offs and EFL Trophy)		Total	
Club	Season	Division	Apps	Goals	Apps	Goals	Apps	Goals	Apps	Goals	Apps	Goals
Dundee	2006–07	Scottish First Division	1	0	0	0	0	0	0	0	1	0
Dundee	2007–08	Scottish First Division	0	0	0	0	0	0	1	0	1	0
Dundee	2008–09	Scottish First Division	1	0	0	0	0	0	1	0	2	0
Dundee	2009–10	Scottish First Division	24	2	2	1	3	1	4	2	33	6
Dundee	2010–11	Scottish First Division	33	8	1	0	1	2	0	0	37	8
Dundee	Total		59	10	3	1	4	1	8	2	74	14
Montrose (loan)	2007–08	Scottish Third Division	9	0	—		—		1	0	10	0
Arbroath (loan)	2008–09	Scottish Second Division	26	2	1	0	0	0	0	0	27	2
Watford	2011–12	Championship	20	3	1	2	1	0	—		22	5
Watford	2012–13	Championship	2	0	0	0	2	0	0	0	4	0
Watford	Total		22	3	1	2	3	0	0	0	26	5
Bradford City (loan)	2012–13	League Two	7	0	0	0	—		1	1	8	1
Derby County (loan)	2012–13	Championship	10	0	—		—		—		10	0
Derby County	2013–14	Championship	46	2	1	0	3	0	3	0	53	2
Derby County	2014–15	Championship	44	1	2	0	5	0	—		51	1
Derby County	2015–16	Championship	12	0	0	0	1	0	0	0	13	0
Derby County	2016–17	Championship	3	1	0	0	1	0	—		4	1
Derby County	2017–18	Championship	31	0	0	0	2	0	2	0	35	0
Derby County	2018–19	Championship	13	0	0	0	2	0	0	0	15	0
Derby County	2019–20	Championship	22	0	3	0	0	0	—		25	0
Derby County	2020–21	Championship	20	0	0	0	1	0	—		21	0
Derby County	2021–22	Championship	26	3	1	0	2	0	—		29	3
Derby County	2022–23	League One	41	0	5	0	3	0	3	0	52	0
Derby County	2023–24	League One	26	3	2	0	1	0	3	0	32	3
Derby County	2024–25	Championship	39	3	1	0	2	0	—		42	3
Derby County	2025–26	Championship	19	1	1	0	2	0	—		22	1
Derby County	2026–27	Championship	2	0	0	0	1	0	—		3	0
Derby County	Total		344	14	16	0	26	0	11	0	397	14
Career total			477	29	21	3	33	1	21	3	552	36

=== International ===
Appearances and goals by national team and year
National team	Year	Apps	Goals
Scotland	2014	1	0
Scotland	2015	3	0
Total		4	0

== Honours ==
Dundee

- Scottish Challenge Cup: 2009

Derby County

- League One second-place promotion: 2023–24
