= Derek Soutar =

Scottish footballer

Personal information
- Date of birth: 4 June 1981 (age 45)
- Place of birth: Dundee, Scotland
- Position: Goalkeeper

Senior career*
| Years | Team | Apps | (Gls) |
| 1998–2006 | Dundee | 44 | (0) |
| 2000–2001 | → Brechin City (loan) | 31 | (0) |
| 2001–2002 | → Alloa Athletic (loan) | 31 | (0) |
| 2003 | → Alloa Athletic (loan) | 12 | (0) |
| 2003 | → Brechin City (loan) | 12 | (0) |
| 2006–2008 | Aberdeen | 13 | (0) |
| 2008–2009 | Ross County | 13 | (0) |
| 2009–2010 | Dundee | 2 | (0) |
| 2010 | APEP | 0 | (0) |
| 2011–2012 | Formartine United | | |
| 2012–2013 | Forfar Athletic | 10 | (0) |

International career
| 2000–2002 | Scotland U-21 | 11 | (0) |
| 2004 | Scotland B | 1 | (0) |
- * Club domestic league appearances and goals

Derek Soutar (born 4 June 1981) is a Scottish former professional footballer who played as a goalkeeper.

== Career ==
Soutar began his career with Dundee and had loan spells with Brechin City and Alloa Athletic.

He signed for Aberdeen in July 2006. Things looked bright for Soutar after the Dons' regular keeper, Jamie Langfield, had a drink fuelled bust up with manager Jimmy Calderwood after bumping into the manager during his honeymoon. As a result of the incident Langfield was demoted to the bench and Soutar was made first choice. On 15 April 2008, he was told he would not be offered a new contract by Aberdeen and would be free to leave in the summer along with six other players.

Soutar signed for Ross County the following September but was freed in the summer of 2009, before being listed as a trialist substitute with Dundee earlier this season before rejoining the club. He was released by the club on 4 May 2010 along with 8 other players, and two days later signed a contract with Cypriot side APEP F.C.

On 6 January 2011, Derek Soutar signed a two-and-a-half-year deal with Formartine United. Soutar signed for Forfar Athletic during the 2012 summer transfer window.

In March 2011, Soutar set up the Derek Soutar Goalkeeping and Footballing School to help children learn and develop general football and specialised goalkeeping skills. Soutar was employed by Dundee United to coach their young goalkeepers, but he was sacked from this role in April 2015 after he posted a Facebook message celebrating a victory for Dundee FC in a Dundee derby match.

=== International ===
Soutar made appearances for both Scotland U21 and Scotland B.

== Honours ==
Dundee

- Scottish Challenge Cup: 2009–10
