= Gary Harkins =

Scottish footballer (born 1985)

Personal information
- Full name: Gary Harkins
- Date of birth: 2 January 1985 (age 41)
- Place of birth: Greenock, Scotland
- Height: 1.88 m (6 ft 2 in)
- Position: Midfielder

Youth career
- Celtic
- 2001–2003: Blackburn Rovers

Senior career*
Years	Team	Apps	(Gls)
2003–2006	Blackburn Rovers	0	(0)
2004	→ Huddersfield Town (loan)	3	(0)
2005	→ Bury (loan)	5	(0)
2005	→ Blackpool (loan)	4	(1)
2006–2007	Grimsby Town	17	(0)
2007–2009	Partick Thistle	63	(9)
2009–2011	Dundee	70	(20)
2011–2013	Kilmarnock	46	(3)
2013	Dundee	14	(2)
2013–2014	St Mirren	15	(1)
2014	→ Oldham Athletic (loan)	23	(5)
2014–2016	Dundee	58	(8)
2016–2017	Ayr United	32	(5)
2017–2018	Greenock Morton	34	(8)
2018	Queen of the South	13	(1)
2019–2020	Partick Thistle	22	(0)
2020	Stenhousemuir	3	(0)
2020	Gartcairn Juniors	0	(0)
2021–2022	Forfar Athletic	20	(0)
2022–2023	Kilbirnie Ladeside	0	(0)
2023	Glenafton Athletic	3	(1)
Total		446	(66)

Managerial career
- 2021–2022: Forfar Athletic (first team coach)
- 2022–2023: Kilbirnie Ladeside (first team coach)
- 2023: Glenafton Athletic (assistant manager)
- * Club domestic league appearances and goals as of 01:04, 26 July 2024 (UTC)

Gary Harkins (born 2 January 1985) is a Scottish professional footballer and coach who plays as a midfielder.

Having come through the youth academies at Celtic and Blackburn Rovers he would notably play in the Scottish Premiership for Kilmarnock, Dundee and St. Mirren. He also played in the English Football League for Huddersfield Town, Bury, Blackpool, Grimsby Town and Oldham Athletic, and in the Scottish Football League for Partick Thistle, Ayr United, Greenock Morton, Queen of the South, Stenhousemuir and Forfar Athletic. While at Forfar, he would also perform the role of first team coach, and later assistant manager.

== Club career ==
=== Blackburn Rovers ===
Born in Greenock, Scotland, Harkins started out as a schoolboy player with Celtic where he spent three years there. Harkins was offered a move to Bolton Wanderers or stay at Celtic but opted to join Blackburn Rovers as a YTS player instead when he was sixteen years old. While progressing through the club's academy, Harkins played for the Blackburn Rovers’ under–19 squad throughout the 2002–03 season, scoring five goals in five matches throughout November. He helped the club's academy win the national age-group title after beating Aston Villa over two-legs in the final.

Harkins was appointed a trainee at Ewood Park in August 2003 but although he appeared in the academy and reserve teams, he did not play a competitive first team game for the club. The arrival of Mark Hughes as manager of Blackburn Rovers in September 2004 saw Harkins called up to play with the first team in a number of pre-season friendlies, with Hughes apparently seeing potential in his future as a central defender. At the end of the 2005–06 season, he was released by the club.

==== Loan spells from Blackburn Rovers ====
Harkins joined Huddersfield Town on loan on 25 March 2004. He made his debut for the club, coming on as a 76th-minute substitute, in a 1–1 draw against Leyton Orient on 3 April 2004. Harkins made only three appearances before returning to Blackburn in June.

On 8 February 2005, Harkins joined Bury on a one-month loan. On the same day, he made his debut for the Shakers, starting the whole game, in a 0–0 draw against Shrewsbury Town. Having played five times in a month-long spell, Harkins returned to his parent club.

On 16 November 2005, Harkins joined Blackpool on loan for one month. He made his debut for the club, starting the match, in a 3–2 loss against Colchester United on 19 November 2005. Harkins scored in the next two matches for the club, coming against Carlisle United and Chesterfield. He went on to make six appearances and scoring two goals before returning to his parent club.

=== Grimsby Town ===
On 11 July 2006, Harkins joined Grimsby Town on a free transfer, signing a two-year contract.

He made his debut for the club, starting the whole game, in a 3–2 win against Boston United in the opening game of the season. Harkins went on to make twenty appearances in total for Grimsby Town in the 2006–07 season. His spell at Grimsby Town was an unhappy one, with factors including homesickness and a falling-out with manager Alan Buckley (who joined the club in November 2006). Reflecting on his time at the club, he said: "I hadn't been happy since moving to Grimsby and was a bit homesick. I had a really tough time at Grimsby – the name says it all, really! I just had to get out, even though I had a year left on my contract. I didn't do myself any favours and didn't get on well with the manager – it was a big growing-up experience for me. The manager who signed me, Graham Rodger, got sacked after a few months then Alan Buckley came in and I just didn't get on with him." At the end of the 2006–07 season, Buckley allowed Harkins to look for another club. Instead, Harkins was released by the club several weeks later.

=== Partick Thistle (first spell) ===
Harkins then moved to his native Scotland, and after a trial signed a one-year contract with Scottish First Division club Partick Thistle on 22 July 2007.

He made his debut for the club, starting the whole game, in a 1–1 draw against Stirling Albion in the opening game of the season. In a follow–up match, Harkins scored his first goal for Partick Thistle, in a 2–1 win against Airdrieonians in the first round of the Scottish League Cup. A month later, on 4 September 2007, he scored again, in a 3–1 win against Berwick Rangers in the second round of the Scottish League Cup. On 3 November 2007, Harkins scored his first league goal for the club, in a 2–1 win against Clyde. While he started out at Thistle playing as a defender, his move into midfield let him play in a more attacking role. On 11 December 2007, Harkins signed a one–year contract with Partick Thistle. In a quarter–final of the Scottish Cup match against Rangers on 19 March 2008, he performed impressively throughout the match that resulted in a 1–1 draw, which resulted in a replay match. After the match, Harkins’ performance was praised by manager Ian McCall and was named Man of the Match. However in the replay match, the club loss 2–0 and was eliminated from the tournament. After serving a two match suspension, he signed a two–year contract with Partick Thistle, keeping him until 2010. At the end of the 2007–08 season, Harkins made forty appearances and scoring three times in all competitions. Manager Ian McCall, again, praised his performance for being "an increasingly influential for the club over the closing months of the campaign."

At the start of the 2008–09 season, Harkins captained Partick Thistle for the match against Queen's Park in the first round of the Scottish League Cup when he set up the second goal of the game, in a 2–1 win. Harkins then captained the club in a number of matches in the absence of Alan Archibald. He scored his first goal of the season, in a 4–2 win against Peterhead in the last 16 of the Scottish League Cup. Harkins scored two goals in two matches between 23 August 2008 and 26 August 2008 against St Johnstone and Dundee. He continued to regain his first team place for Partick Thistle, who performed "outstanding form", "who sets himself high standards and he believes his game has still to hit the heights." At some point, Harkins played in the centre–back position, due to the absence of other defenders. On 20 September 2008, he scored his fourth goal of the season, in a 2–1 win against Greenock Morton. During the match, Harkins suffered ankle injury and was substituted in the 64th minute. But he recovered and made his return to the starting line–up, in a 2–1 loss against Rangers in the third round of the Scottish League Cup. On 1 November 2008, Harkins scored from a penalty spot, in a 2–0 win against Queen of the South. He then scored two goals in two matches between 29 November 2008 and 13 December 2008 against Stirling Albion and Airdrieonians. Harkins’ performance attracted interest from Scottish clubs in the January transfer window. Amid the transfer speculation, he maintained his form at Partick Thistle, including scoring against Clyde. On 28 February 2009, Harkins scored a brace to help the club win 4–2 against Livingston. After the match, he hoped his goalscoring exploits would help Partick Thistle achieve promotion to the Scottish Premier League. After scoring the winning goal against Dunfermline Athletic, Harkins’ performances earned him the Scottish Football League's Player of the Month for February 2009. On 4 April 2009, he scored the late equaliser, in a 1–1 draw against title contender, St Johnstone, to help the club keep the title race alive. However, his two match suspension led Partick Thistle to surrender their title hopes to St Johnstone. At the end of the 2008–09 season, Harkins scored twelve goals, making him the Partick Thistle's top goal scorer with 12 goals from 41 appearances.

For his performance throughout the 2008–09 season, Harkins won the First Division's Player of the Year and Partick Thistle's Player of the Year awards. At the end of the 2008–09 season, Harkins was offered a new contract by Partick Thistle. However, he reportedly rejected a deal, something that was denied by Ian McCall.

=== Dundee (first spell) ===
After a protracted effort in which they had three offers turned down, Dundee's manager Jocky Scott said the third offer would be their last for Harkins. On 1 July 2009, the Dens increased their bid of £150,000 plus future fees for him, which was accepted by Partick Thistle. The next day, Harkins officially joined Dundee for a £150,000 plus future fees, signing a two–year contract.

He scored on his debut for the Dens, in a 5–0 win against Stranraer in the first round of the Scottish League Cup. Harkins scored four goals throughout August, including a brace against Inverness Caledonian Thistle. For his performance, he won the SFL Player of the Month for August 2009. Harkins quickly became a first team regular at Dundee in the midfield position. Between September and October, he scored three goals for the Dens, including two goals against Dunfermline Athletic on two separate occasions. In the Scottish Challenge Cup Final against Inverness Caledonian Thistle, Harkins scored the equalising goal, as Dundee won 3–2 to win the tournament. This was followed up by scoring in the next four league matches, including one against his former club, Partick Thistle. However, in a match against Inverness Caledonian Thistle, on 26 December 2009, he received a red card for a second bookable offence, in a 1–1 draw. After serving a one match suspension, Harkins returned to the starting line–up, in a 3–2 win against Dunfermline Athletic on 17 January 2010. Harkins then scored two goals in two league matches between 6 March 2010 and 17 March 2010 against Inverness Caledonian Thistle and Ayr United. On 30 March 2010, he scored his fifteenth goal of the season, in a 2–1 loss against Dunfermline Athletic. In a follow–up match against Ayr United, Harkins suffered a knock and was substituted in the 49th minute, as the club won 3–0, but he quickly recovered. He then scored two more goals for Dundee by the end of April. At the end of the 2009–10 season, Harkins made forty–five appearances and scoring nineteen goals in all competitions. For his performance, he was nominated for Scotland's Player of the Year for the First Division.

Ahead of the 2010–11 season, Harkins was named as the new captain of Dundee by manager Gordon Chisholm after he captained a number of friendly matches in the Dens’ pre–season. Following the appointment, Harkins said he would try his best to become a captain. In the opening game of the season, Harkins scored his first of the season, in a 1–0 win against Queen of the South. A month later, on 11 September 2010, he scored his second goal of the season, in a 3–1 loss against Dunfermline Athletic. However, the season was overshadowed by Dundee entering administration and was penalised 25 points by the Scottish Football League the following month. Harkins, who said the Dens entering administration was the darkest day of his career, expressed optimism that Dundee would avoid relegation. He led the Dens to go on a twenty–three match undefeated streak that saw Dundee out of the relegation zone. On 2 January 2011, Harkins scored his third goal of the season, in a 2–0 win against Ross County. On 12 February 2011, he scored the equalising goal in the final 10 minutes of the game, as Dundee eventually beat 2–1 against Raith Rovers. On 16 April 2011, he scored his fifth goal of the season, in a 3–1 win against Greenock Morton. At the end of the 2010–11 season, Harkins played in every match for the Dens, as he made forty–one appearances and scoring five times in all competitions. For his performance, Harkins was named PFA first division team of the year. He was also nominated for SFL Player of the Year in the First Division.

=== Kilmarnock ===
On 20 June 2011, Harkins left Dundee to sign for Kilmarnock for an undisclosed fee, exercising an option to leave agreed when Dundee went into administration in the previous November.

He made his first appearance for the Ayrshire side on 24 July 2011, in a 1–1 draw with Dundee United at Tannadice in the opening game of the season. Since joining the club, Harkins became involved in the first team, playing in the midfield position. He then scored his first goal for Kilmarnock, and set up a goal for Paul Heffernan, who went on to score a hat–trick, in a 5–0 win over Queen of the South in the third round of the Scottish League Cup. A month later, on 25 October 2011, Harkins scored his second goal for the club, in a 2–0 win against East Fife in the quarter–finals of the Scottish League Cup. On 3 December 2011, he scored his third goal for Kilmarnock and set up the second goal of the game, in a 2–0 win against Aberdeen. However, Harkins suffered ankle injury during training and was for two weeks. But on 17 January 2012, he made his return from injury to start against his former club, Dundee, in the fourth round replay of the Scottish Cup, and set up two goals, in a 2–0 win to help the club go through to the next round. However, his return was short–lived when Harkins suffered an injury that saw him out for four matches. But Harkins made his return from injury, starting a match and played 64 minutes before being substituted, in a 3–1 loss against Hibernian on 25 February 2012. On 18 March 2012, he played in the Scottish League Cup Final against Celtic, playing 64 minutes before being substituted, as Kilmarnock won 1–0 to win the tournament. At the end of the 2011–12 season, Harkins made thirty–five appearances and scoring three times in all competitions. However, despite winning the Scottish League Cup, he said the 2011–12 season was disappointing, saying: "I put the pressure on myself. I had a disappointing season last year. I didn't score enough goals or create enough last year."

At the start of the 2012–13 season, Harkins, however, suffered an injury in the 5th minute of the game against Inverness Caledonian Thistle and was substituted, as the match ended in a 1–1 draw. But he recovered quickly and returned to the starting line–up Motherwell on 18 August 2012 and scored his first goal of the season, in a 2–1 loss. In a follow–up match against Dundee United, however, Harkins suffered a head injury and was substituted in the 15th minute, as Kilmarnock won 3–0. After missing one match, he returned to the first team, coming on as a 79th-minute substitute, in a 2–1 loss against Hibernian on 15 September 2012. On 10 November 2012, Harkins scored his second goal of the season, in a 3–0 win against Ross County. However, by December, he soon lost his first team place at the Killie after a falling out with manager Kenny Shiels when they had a bust up following a 1–1 draw against Hibernian on 23 December 2012. During January 2013, it was reported that Harkins could return to Dundee; this was initially denied by manager Kenny Shiels, who claimed that Harkins was "one of the best players in the SPL" despite their fallen out. By the time he left Kilmarnock, Harkins made seventeen appearances and scoring two times in the first half of the 2012–13 season.

=== Dundee (second spell) ===
It was reported by The Courier that Dundee agreed to sign Harkins on loan until the end of the 2012–13 season. On 25 January 2013, it was confirmed that Harkins had rejoined Dundee for an undisclosed fee. As part of the deal, the two clubs agreed that he would not play when they met the following weekend at Dens Park.

Harkins's first game after signing for Dundee on a permanent basis came on 30 January 2013, in a 1–0 loss against Hearts. He quickly became a first team regular at the Dens, playing in the midfield position. In a match against St Mirren on 8 March 2013, Harkins helped Dundee win 2–1 to end the winless streak in the league and was named Man of the Match for his performance. Then, on 6 April 2013, the last game of the season before it split, he scored twice in a 2–0 win against his former club, Kilmarnock. In a follow–up match against St Mirren, Harkins set up the winning goal for Carl Finnigan, in a 2–1 win. After missing one match due to a rib injury, Harkins returned to the starting line–up against Aberdeen on 5 May 2013, where he was unable to help the Dens avoid relegation after their relegation was confirmed following a 1–1 draw. At the end of the 2012–13 season, he made fourteen appearances and scoring two goals in all competitions.

Following their relegation, Harkins said his future was uncertain at Dundee as he wanted to play at the higher level. Despite initially agreeing to stay at the Dens, he changed his mind and soon announced his departure from the Dens, citing the club's failure to agree a change of ownership.

=== St Mirren ===
Harkins agreed a two-year contract with St Mirren on 3 June 2013.

He made his debut for the club, starting the whole game, in a 3–0 loss against Inverness Caledonian Thistle in the opening game of the season. In a follow–up match, Harkins scored the equalising goal against former club Kilmarnock, as the match ended in a 1–1 draw. On 11 December 2013, he scored his second goal for St Mirren, in a 3–0 win over Queen of the South in the fourth round replay of Scottish Cup. However, Harkins’ first team opportunities at the club was limited, due to Paul McGowan being preferred, which he vowed to fight for his place in the first team. After leaving St Mirren, Harkins was criticised by manager Danny Lennon for not "working hard enough off the ball to succeed at the club". By the time he left St Mirren, Harkins made seventeen appearances and scoring two times in all competitions.

After Harkins' loan spell at Oldham Athletic came to an end, St Mirren announced on 27 June 2014 that the midfielder had his contract with the club cancelled by mutual consent.

==== Oldham Athletic (loan) ====
Following an unsuccessful spell at St Mirren, Harkins joined League One side Oldham Athletic on loan until the end of the 2013–14 season.

He made his debut for the club, starting the match and played 74 minutes before being substituted, in a 1–0 win against Stevenage on 14 January 2014. He scored his first goals for Oldham Athletic in a 5–4 win against Peterborough after coming back from 3–0 down at half–time. His first goal of the game came in the 48th minute when Harkins bundled into the back of the net after a knockdown from Jonson Clarke-Harris to make it 3–1. His second goal of the game came in the 89th minute when he scored from a penalty spot to make it 4–4 in the closing minutes and then had the final say in the match, delivering the corner from which Genseric Kusunga scored to make it 5–4 in the 96th minute. After the match, Harkins deservedly won man of the match for his performance and he gained many plaudits post-match. Since joining Oldham Athletic, he became a first team regular for the club and became a fans' favourite among the Latics supporters. Manager Lee Johnson praised Harkins’ performances, due to his impact made since joining the club. A month later, on 22 February 2014, he scored his second goal for Oldham Athletic, in a 1–0 win against Gillingham. He then scored two more goals for the club the following month in March, coming against Preston North End and Crewe Alexandra. At the end of the 2013–14 season, Harkins made twenty–four appearances and scoring five goals in all competitions. Following this, he returned to his parent club.

=== Dundee (third spell) ===
On 30 June 2014, Harkins signed a two-year contract with Dundee for the third time.

He scored against Manchester City in a pre-season friendly, which the Dens went on to win 2–0. Harkins made his third debut for Dundee, starting the whole game, in a 4–0 win against Peterhead in the second round of the Scottish League Cup. In a follow–up match, he scored his first goal of his third spell at the Dens with a penalty, in a 1–1 draw against his former club, Kilmarnock. In a next game against Partick Thistle, Harkins took a penalty, only for it to be saved by Paul Gallacher; the match ended 1–1. Since joining Dundee, he quickly became a first team regular, playing in the midfield position. Harkins then scored two goals in two league matches between 4 October 2014 and 18 October 2014 against Aberdeen and Motherwell. His goal celebration against Motherwell went viral after he performed a wrestling move on teammate Jim McAlister, which met with approval from professional wrestler Randy Orton. In a follow–up match against Hamilton Academical, Harkins set up two goals, in a 2–0 win. However, in the return against Hamilton Academical, on 13 December 2014, he received a red card after a second bookable offense, in a 2–1 loss against Hamilton Academical. After serving a one match suspension, Harkins returned to the first team, coming on as a 68th-minute substitute, in a 3–1 loss against St Mirren on 27 December 2014. A month later, on 17 January 2015, he scored his third goal of the season in a 3–3 draw against Aberdeen. However, during a match against St Mirren on 24 January 2015, Harkins suffered both head and shin injuries and was substituted in the 65th minute, as the Dens won 2–1. After missing two matches, he made his return to the starting line–up against Partick Thistle on 14 February 2015 and set up the goal for Paul McGowan to score at the last minute, in a 1–0 win. However, his return was short–lived when Harkins suffered a knee injury that caused him to miss eight matches. On 9 May 2015, he made his return to the first team, coming on as an 82nd-minute substitute, in a 1–0 loss against Inverness Caledonian Thistle. At the end of the 2014–15 season, Harkins made thirty–one appearances and scoring four times in all competitions.

At the start of the 2015–16 season, Harkins set up two goals in the first five league matches of the season. However, in a match against Aberdeen, on 22 August 2015, he received a straight red card in the last minute of the game for fouling Adam Rooney in the penalty box, as Dundee loss 2–0. After serving a one match suspension, Harkins made his return to the starting line–up, in a 1–0 win against Partick Thistle on 12 September 2015. However, by October, he soon lost his place in the starting line–up and was placed on the substitute bench. By December, Harkins soon worked his way back to the starting eleven. He scored his first goal of the season, in a 3–1 loss against Motherwell on 12 December 2015. A month later, on 16 January 2016, Harkins scored a brace and set up two goals, in a 4–2 win against Partick Thistle. Ten days later, on 26 January 2016, he scored his third goal of the season, in a 3–1 win against Falkirk in the fourth round of the Scottish Cup. Harkins then became a captain for the Dens for a number of matches in the absence of James McPake. On 19 February 2016, Dundee opted to take up their option of a two year contract extension that would ensure his stay at the Dens. On 21 February 2016, in a buildup to a match against Rangers in the quarter–finals of the Scottish Cup, Harkins made a comment about the opposition team, calling them "the new Rangers". This led him receiving warnings from manager Paul Hartley over his comment. He said the comment was meant to be a joke. However, Harkins started as captain and was booed by Rangers’ supporters throughout the match, as Dundee loss 4–0 and was out of the Scottish Cup. After serving a one match suspension, he returned to the first team, coming on as a 62nd-minute substitute, in a 0–0 draw against Celtic on 5 April 2016. In a follow–up match, Harkins scored his third goal of the season, in a 2–1 loss against Hamilton Academical. However, he suffered ankle injury that saw him out for the rest of the 2015–16 season. At the end of the 2015–16 season, Harkins made thirty–five appearances and scoring five times in all competitions.

However, the start of the 2016–17 season saw Harkins find his first team opportunities at Dundee limited, having fallen out of favour with Paul Hartley. This caused him to train with the Dens’ youth team.

=== Ayr United ===
On 12 August 2016, it was confirmed that Harkins had signed a two-year contract as a player/coach with newly promoted Scottish Championship club Ayr United.

He made his debut for the club, starting the whole game, and set up a goal, in a 4–1 loss against Queen of the South in the opening game of the season. Since joining Ayr United, Harkins became a first team regular, playing in the midfield position. Despite not being fit for the match against Greenock Morton on 12 September 2016, he started the match nevertheless and set up a goal, in a 2–1 win. Harkins then scored his first goal for the club, in a 1–0 win against Falkirk in the last 16 of the Scottish League Cup. This was followed up by setting up two goals for Alan Forrest, who went on to score a hat–trick, in a 3–0 win against Dumbarton on 15 October 2016. He scored two more goals by the end of 2016, coming against Raith Rovers and Dumbarton. In the second half of the season, Harkins scored three goals, scoring against Falkirk in two separate matches, and Dundee United. However, Greenock Morton was relegated to Scottish League One after losing 2–1 against Raith Rovers in the last game of the season. At the end of the 2016–17 season, Harkins made forty appearances and scoring six times in all competitions.

=== Greenock Morton ===
Having negotiated a release from his contract at Ayr United after only a year, in June 2017 Harkins subsequently signed a one-year deal for Scottish Championship side, Greenock Morton on 7 June 2017.

He made his debut for the club, starting a match and played 66 minutes before being substituted, in a 1–0 win against Berwick Rangers in the group stage of the Scottish League Cup. In a follow-up match against Queen's Park, Harkins scored the winning penalty after the match ended in a 2–2 draw. However, in a match against Motherwell, he received a straight red card for a foul on Craig Tanner, as Greenock Morton loss 4–0. After serving a two match suspension, Harkins made his return to the first team, coming on as a 76th-minute substitute, in a 4–1 win against St Mirren. Since returning from suspension, he became a first team regular for the club, playing in the midfield position. On 9 September 2017, Harkins scored his first goal for Greenock Morton, scoring a free –kick, in a 3–2 win against Dunfermline Athletic. He later scored five more goals for the club by the end of 2017. Harkins then scored two more goals for Greenock Morton in the second half of the season. After missing one match due to a knock, he returned to the starting line–up, in a 1–1 draw against Dundee United on 31 March 2018. In the last game of the season, Harkins captained the club, starting the whole game, in a 3–1 loss against Inverness Caledonian Thistle. At the end of the 2017–18 season, he made forty–one appearances and scoring eight times in all competitions for Greenock Morton.

=== Queen of the South ===
On 9 May 2018, Harkins signed for Dumfries club Queen of the South, initially on a one-year contract.

He scored on his debut for the club, as well as, setting up two goals, in a 5–3 win against Stranraer in the group stage of the Scottish League Cup. Harkins then set up three goals in the first three league matches of the season. He scored two goals in two matches between 1 September 2018 and 8 September 2018 against Ayr United and Crusaders. However, Harkins suffered a hamstring injury during a match against Alloa Athletic on 6 October 2018 and was substituted in the 58th minute. After the match, it was announced that he would be out for two matches. But he made his return from injury, coming on as a 73rd-minute substitute, in a 2–0 loss against Dundee United on 3 November 2018. However, Harkins missed two matches for Queen of the South in two separate occasions. On 24 December 2018, he was released from his contract at the Doonhamers, after intimating that he no longer wanted to play for the club. By the time Harkins left Queen of the South, he made twenty appearances and scoring three times in all competitions.

=== Partick Thistle (second spell) ===
Harkins signed for Partick Thistle for a second spell on an 18-month contract on 27 December 2018, three days after leaving Queen of the South.

He made his debut for the club, starting the match and played 65 minutes before being substituted, in a 1–1 draw against Dundee United on 5 January 2019. In a follow–up match against Falkirk, Harkins received a red card for a second bookable offence, in a 1–1 draw. After serving a one match suspension, he made his return to the first team, coming on as a 72nd-minute substitute, in a 2–1 win against Inverness Caledonian Thistle on 2 February 2019. Harkins remained in the first team for Partick Thistle for the rest of the 2018–19 season. At the end of the 2018–19 season, he made sixteen appearances in all competitions.

At the start of the 2019–20 season, however, Harkins suffered ankle injury that required surgery. He made his first appearance of the season, coming on as a 77th-minute substitute, in a 3–1 win against his former club, Dundee on 19 October 2019. A month later, on 16 November 2019, Harkins scored his first goal in his second spell at the Jags in a 4–1 win away at Stenhousemuir in the quarter final of the Scottish Challenge Cup. On 29 January 2020, he was released by the club, becoming a free agent. By the time Harkins left Partick Thistle, he made twelve appearances and scoring once in all competitions.

=== Stenhousemuir ===
On 7 February 2020, Harkins signed a contract until the end of the 2019–20 season with League Two side Stenhousemuir.

He made his debut for the club, starting the whole game and set up the equalising goal, in a 2–2 draw against Cowdenbeath on 8 February 2020. However, Harkins received a red card in the 80th minute, in a 3–0 loss against Cove Rangers on 29 February 2020, in what turned out to be the last appearance for Stenhousemuir. The season was curtailed because of the COVID-19 pandemic, with the club finishing in eighth place.

On 10 June 2020, Harkins announced his retirement from playing via Twitter. The next day, Stenhousemuir confirmed his departure from the club.

=== Gartcairn Juniors ===
Just over 3 weeks after announcing his retirement, Harkins returned to football after signing a deal to play with Gartcairn F. A. Juniors in the newly established West of Scotland Football League. In December 2020, Harkins would leave Gartcairn without having played a competitive game for the club.

== Coaching career ==
Harkins said that he would like to move to coaching once his playing career comes to an end. Harkins has a UEFA B-licence coaching badge.

=== Forfar Athletic ===
On 17 June 2021, Harkins was appointed as the first team coach for Scottish League Two side Forfar Athletic underneath manager and former Dundee teammate Gary Irvine, as well as being registered as a player.

On 13 July 2021, he made his debut for the club, coming on as 77th-minute substitute, against Montrose in the group stage of the Scottish League Cup and scored in a shootout to win 5–4 following a 0–0 draw. Harkins often appear in the first team, due to Forfar Athletic's lack of available players. In the absence of manager Irvine, he stood for him for the match against Kelty Hearts on 19 February 2022 and helped the club win 1–0.

Following Scott Robertson's departure from the Loons on 14 June 2022, Harkins was also named as player-assistant manager. Four days later, on 18 June 2022, he also registered as a player for the club once again. On 11 November 2022, following the sacking of Irvine and the hiring of new manager Ray McKinnon, Forfar announced that Harkins had departed the club.

=== Kilbirnie Ladeside ===
On 6 December 2022, Harkins joined West of Scotland Football League First Division club Kilbirnie Ladeside as a player-coach under manager Shaun Dillon.

=== Glenafton Athletic ===
On 4 September 2023, Harkins joined West of Scotland Football League Premier Division club Glenafton Athletic as player-assistant manager under manager Mark Roberts.

On 9 September 2023, he made his debut for the cub, coming on as a 60th-minute substitute, in a 1–0 loss against Gartcairn F. A. Juniors. On 21 October 2023, Harkins scored his first goal for Glenafton Athletic, in a 7–2 win against Dalry Thistle. On 9 November 2023, Harkins and Roberts left Glenafton by mutual agreement after having made 3 appearances and scored 1 goal.

== Personal life ==
Born in Greenock, Harkins attended St Columba's High School, Gourock, where he played in a wide variety of positions and for various teams before signing for Blackburn Rovers.

His brother, Paul is also a footballer, playing in Scottish League Two for Elgin City. In 2012, after a scan for ligament damage, Gary revealed that doctors had told him he had been playing with a broken ankle for four years.

During his playing career, Harkins earned a nickname Zizou by his team-mates due to a perceived resemblance to Zinedine Zidane. He is married and together they have one daughter.

== Career statistics ==
As of match played 5 November 2022

Appearances and goals by club, season and competition
Club	Season	League			National Cup		League Cup		Other		Total	
Club	Season	Division	Apps	Goals	Apps	Goals	Apps	Goals	Apps	Goals	Apps	Goals
Blackburn Rovers	2003–04	Premier League	0	0	0	0	0	0	0	0	0	0
Blackburn Rovers	2004–05	Premier League	0	0	0	0	0	0	0	0	0	0
Blackburn Rovers	2005–06	Premier League	0	0	0	0	0	0	0	0	0	0
Blackburn Rovers	Total		0	0	0	0	0	0	0	0	0	0
Huddersfield Town (loan)	2003–04	Third Division	3	0	0	0	0	0	0	0	3	0
Bury (loan)	2004–05	EFL League Two	5	0	0	0	0	0	0	0	5	0
Blackpool (loan)	2005–06	EFL League One	5	1	0	0	0	0	1	1	6	2
Grimsby Town	2006–07	EFL League Two	17	0	2	0	0	0	1	0	20	0
Partick Thistle	2007–08	Scottish First Division	29	1	6	0	3	1	2	1	40	3
Partick Thistle	2008–09	Scottish First Division	34	8	2	1	3	1	3	1	42	11
Partick Thistle	Total		63	9	8	1	6	2	5	2	82	14
Dundee	2009–10	Scottish First Division	34	15	3	1	4	1	4	2	45	19
Dundee	2010–11	Scottish First Division	36	5	1	0	2	0	2	0	41	5
Dundee	Total		70	20	4	1	6	1	6	2	86	24
Kilmarnock	2011–12	Scottish Premier League	30	1	1	0	4	2	0	0	35	3
Kilmarnock	2012–13	Scottish Premier League	16	2	1	0	0	0	0	0	17	2
Kilmarnock	Total		46	3	2	0	4	2	0	0	52	5
Dundee	2012–13	Scottish Premier League	14	2	0	0	0	0	0	0	14	2
St Mirren	2013–14	Scottish Premiership	15	1	1	1	1	0	0	0	17	2
Oldham Athletic (loan)	2013–14	EFL League One	23	5	1	0	0	0	0	0	24	5
Dundee	2014–15	Scottish Premiership	28	4	1	0	2	0	0	0	31	4
Dundee	2015–16	Scottish Premiership	30	4	4	1	1	0	0	0	35	5
Dundee	2016–17	Scottish Premiership	0	0	0	0	0	0	0	0	0	0
Dundee	Total		58	8	5	1	3	0	0	0	66	9
Ayr United	2016–17	Scottish Championship	32	5	6	0	0	0	2	1	40	6
Greenock Morton	2017–18	Scottish Championship	34	8	3	0	3	0	1	0	41	8
Queen of the South	2018–19	Scottish Championship	13	1	0	0	5	1	2	1	20	3
Partick Thistle	2018–19	Scottish Championship	17	0	4	0	0	0	1	1	22	1
Partick Thistle	2019–20	Scottish Championship	9	0	2	0	0	0	1	1	12	1
Partick Thistle	Total		26	0	6	0	0	0	2	2	34	2
Stenhousemuir	2019–20	Scottish League Two	3	0	0	0	0	0	0	0	3	0
Gartcairn F. A. Juniors	2020–21	West of Scotland League	0	0	0	0	0	0	0	0	0	0
Forfar Athletic	2021–22	Scottish League Two	17	0	0	0	2	0	4	0	23	0
Forfar Athletic	2022–23	Scottish League Two	3	0	0	0	0	0	0	0	3	0
Forfar Athletic	Total		20	0	0	0	2	0	4	0	26	0
Career total			443	63	37	4	30	6	23	8	536	82

== Honours ==
Dundee

- Scottish Challenge Cup: 2010
- Dundee Hall of Fame: 2024 Modern Heroes Award

Kilmarnock

- Scottish League Cup: 2012
