= 2009–10 Scottish Challenge Cup =

2009–10 ALBA Challenge Cup
Tournament details
- Country: Scotland
- Teams: 30

Final positions
- Champions: Dundee
- Runners-up: Inverness Caledonian Thistle

Tournament statistics
- Matches played: 29
- Goals scored: 83 (2.86 per match)

The 2009–10 Scottish Challenge Cup, known as the ALBA Challenge Cup due to sponsorship reasons with MG Alba, was the 19th season of the competition, competed for by all 30 members of the Scottish Football League. The previous winner was Airdrie United, who defeated Ross County 3–2 on penalties after a 2–2 draw in the 2008 final. Airdrie United were knocked out in the first round by Partick Thistle after a 1–0 loss.

The final was contested by Dundee and Inverness Caledonian Thistle at McDiarmid Park, Perth on Sunday 22 November 2009. The competition was won by Dundee who came back from 2–0 down to eventually clinch the victory, 3–2.

== Schedule ==
Round	First match date	Fixtures	Clubs
First round	Sat/Sun 24/25 July 2009	14	30 → 16
Second round	Tuesday 18 August 2009	8	16 → 8
Quarter-finals	Sunday 6 September 2009	4	8 → 4
Semi-finals	Sunday 4 October 2009	2	4 → 2
Final	Sunday 22 November 2009	1	2 → 1

== First round ==
The first round draw was conducted on 28 May 2009.

=== North and East region ===
Dundee received a random bye to the second round.

25 July 2009	Dunfermline Athletic	2–1	Arbroath	East End Park, Dunfermline
15:00	Kirk 50'; Bell 79'	Report	Redman 73'; Dobbins (red card) 87'	Attendance: 1,708; Referee: George Salmond

25 July 2009	East Fife	0–2	Forfar Athletic	Bayview Stadium, Methil
15:00		Report	M Fotheringham 38'; K Fotheringham 77'	Attendance: 446; Referee: John McKendrick

25 July 2009	Elgin City	3–1	Brechin City	Borough Briggs, Elgin
15:00	Crooks 1'; Frizzel 61'; Edwards 74'	Report	McAllister 46'	Attendance: 381; Referee: Colin Brown

25 July 2009	Inverness Caledonian Thistle	1 – 1 (a.e.t.) (5–3 p)	Montrose	Caledonian Stadium, Inverness
15:00	Crighton 45' (o.g.)	Report	Leyden 87'	Attendance: 1,072; Referee: Euan Norris

25 July 2009	Peterhead	1–2	Cowdenbeath	Balmoor, Peterhead
15:00	Bavidge 12'	Report	McBride 52'; McQuade 61'	Attendance: 361; Referee: Mat Northcroft

25 July 2009	Ross County	3 – 2 (a.e.t.)	Alloa Athletic	Victoria Park, Dingwall
15:00	Gardyne 58', 106', 118'	Report	Watt 4' (o.g.); Spence 99'; Carroll (red card) 110'	Attendance: 748; Referee: Douglas McDonald

25 July 2009	Stirling Albion	2–1	Raith Rovers	Forthbank Stadium, Stirling
15:00	Graham 45'; McKenna 54'	Report	Walker 90'	Attendance: 713; Referee: Anthony Law

Source: BBC Sport

=== South and West region ===
East Stirlingshire received a random bye to the second round.

25 July 2009	Airdrie United	0–1	Partick Thistle	New Broomfield, Airdrie
15:00		Report	Buchanan 51'	Attendance: 1,325; Referee: Eddie Smith

25 July 2009	Annan Athletic	2–0	Queen's Park	Galabank, Annan
15:00	Jack 27' (pen.), 90' (pen.)	Report	Reilly (red card) 90'	Attendance: 411; Referee: Mike Tumilty

25 July 2009	Ayr United	0–2	Albion Rovers	Somerset Park, Ayr
15:00		Report	Barr 79'; McFarlane 85'	Attendance: 797; Referee: Eddie Smith

26 July 2009	Dumbarton	0–1	Greenock Morton	Strathclyde Homes Stadium, Dumbarton
15:00		Report	Jenkins 25'	Attendance: 1,122; Referee: Stephen Finnie

25 July 2009	Queen of the South	1–0	Livingston	Palmerston Park, Dumfries
15:00	Wilson 9'	Report		Attendance: 1,558; Referee: Steve Conroy

25 July 2009	Stranraer	4–2	Berwick Rangers	Stair Park, Stranraer
15:00	Jack 11'; Mitchell 18' (pen.), 59'; Montgomerie 87'; Noble (yellow card) 45' (red card)	Report	Ewart 33'; Little 86'; Ewart (red card) 46'	Attendance: 245; Referee: Steven Nicholls

25 July 2009	Stenhousemuir	2–0	Clyde	Ochilview Park, Stenhousemuir
15:00	O'Reilly 75'; Dalziel 90'	Report		Attendance: 603; Referee: Brian Colvin

Source: BBC Sport

== Second round ==
The second round draw was conducted on 28 July 2009 at Hampden Park, Glasgow.

18 August 2009	Dunfermline Athletic	1–2	Queen of the South	East End Park, Dunfermline
19:45	Cardle 53'	Report	Kean 12'; Tosh 90'	Attendance: 941; Referee: Crawford Allen

18 August 2009	Ross County	2–1	Greenock Morton	Victoria Park, Dingwall
19:30	Lawson 68'; Wood 70'	Report	Masterton 63'	Attendance: 588; Referee: John McKendrick

18 August 2009	Stirling Albion	3–1	Stenhousemuir	Forthbank Stadium, Stirling
19:30	Mullen 33'; Robertson 47'; McKenna 80'	Report	Dalziel 49'; Stirling (yellow card) 77' (red card)	Attendance: 275; Referee: Frank McDermott

18 August 2009	Annan Athletic	1–0	East Stirlingshire	Galabank, Annan
19:30	Watson 90'	Report		Attendance: 375; Referee: Thomas Robertson

18 August 2009	Forfar Athletic	1–6	Partick Thistle	Station Park, Forfar
19:45	Templeman 60'	Report	Doolan 10'; Hamilton 51', 52'; Rowson 61'; Donnelly 74'; Cairney 80'	Attendance: 532; Referee: David Somers

18 August 2009	Inverness Caledonian Thistle	3–0	Stranraer	Caledonian Stadium, Inverness
19:30	Foran 12', 32'; Sanchez 29'	Report		Attendance: 885; Referee: Scott MacDonald

18 August 2009	Elgin City	3–0	Albion Rovers	Borough Briggs, Elgin
19:45	Crooks 64' (pen.); Gunn 80', 90'; McDonald (red card) 76'	Report	Canning (red card) 63'	Attendance: 245; Referee: Craig Charleston

18 August 2009	Cowdenbeath	0–3	Dundee	Central Park, Cowdenbeath
19:30		Report	Griffiths 20'; Harkins 82'; Antoine-Curier 88'	Attendance: 457; Referee: George Salmond

Source: BBC Sport

== Quarter-finals ==
The quarter-final draw was conducted on 20 August 2009 at Hampden Park.

6 September 2009
15:00

Annan Athletic	4–2	Elgin City
Gilfillan 56'; Bell 75'; Inglis 80'; Storey 88'	Report	Cameron 6'; Macbeth 43' (o.g.)

Galabank, Annan
Attendance: 534
Referee: Steven McLean

6 September 2009
15:00

Partick Thistle	1 – 1 (a.e.t.) (3 – 4 pen.)	Inverness Caledonian Thistle
Buchanan 77'	Report	Sanchez 6'

Firhill Stadium, Glasgow
Attendance: 1,746
Referee: William Collum

6 September 2009
15:00

Ross County	2–0	Queen of the South
di Giacomo 26'; Craig 90'	Report

Victoria Park, Dingwall
Attendance: 964
Referee: Mike Tumilty

6 September 2009
15:00

Stirling Albion	1–2	Dundee
Devine 89' (pen.)	Report	Griffiths 10', 26'

Forthbank Stadium, Stirling
Attendance: 1,277
Referee: Euan Norris

== Semi-finals ==
The semi-final draw was conducted on 10 September 2009.

4 October 2009
15:00

Inverness Caledonian Thistle	1–0	Ross County
Eagle 44'	Report

Caledonian Stadium, Inverness
Attendance: 2,275
Referee: Stevie O'Reilly

4 October 2009
15:00

Dundee	3–0	Annan Athletic
Higgins 36'; Clarke 63'; Forsyth 71'	Report

Dens Park, Dundee
Attendance: 2,321
Referee: Stephen Finnie

== Final ==
22 November 2009
15:00

Dundee	3–2	Inverness Caledonian Thistle
Bulvītis 48' (o.g.); Harkins 53'; Forsyth 83'	Report	Rooney 20'; Bulvītis 33'; Imrie (red card) 90'

McDiarmid Park, Perth
Attendance: 8,031
Referee: Charlie Richmond
