= Gary MacKenzie =

Scottish footballer

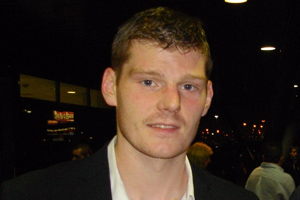

Personal information
- Full name: Gary MacKenzie
- Date of birth: 15 October 1985 (age 41)
- Place of birth: Lanark, Scotland
- Height: 1.91 m (6 ft 3 in)
- Position: Defender

Senior career*
Years	Team	Apps	(Gls)
2004–2006	Rangers	2	(0)
2006–2010	Dundee	97	(2)
2010–2013	Milton Keynes Dons	63	(3)
2013	→ Blackpool (loan)	12	(2)
2013–2015	Blackpool	35	(1)
2015	→ Bradford City (loan)	12	(1)
2015–2016	Doncaster Rovers	12	(0)
2016	→ Notts County (loan)	4	(0)
2016–2020	St Mirren	58	(6)
2020–2021	Peterhead	6	(0)
Total		301	(15)
- * Club domestic league appearances and goals as of 22 December 2020 (UTC)

Gary MacKenzie (born 15 October 1985) is a Scottish retired professional footballer who played as a defender. He was called up to the Scotland national side in 2011 and 2012, but has not played in a full international match.

== Career ==
MacKenzie started his career as a youth player at Rangers. He made two appearances for the first team (at the end of the 2003–04 season), against Motherwell and Dunfermline, respectively.

=== Dundee ===
He joined Dundee on a free transfer in June 2006 under the management of Alex Rae and signed a two-year contract. He made his debut, in the opening game of the season, in a 1–0 loss against Partick Thistle. Later in the season, MacKenzie would be often used in first team ins and out in his first season.

In 2007–08 season, MacKenzie playing time would increase, making 33 appearances. He scored his first goal, in a 3–0 win over Stirling Albion, with a header on 12 April 2008. The 2008–09 season was overshadowed for MacKenzie as he suffered injuries, like toe and many more. In addition, MacKenzie have discipline issue, earning two red cards against Ross County on 28 March 2009 and Livingston on 28 April 2009.; which MacKenzie made 19 appearances.

In 2009–10 season, MacKenzie had average season with the club, making 25 appearances. He scored his second goal in his Dundee career, in a 2–1 win over Raith Rovers on 24 October 2009. However, several days later, in the quarter final of Scottish League Cup, MacKenzie scored an own-goal against his former club, Rangers.

He was released by the club on 4 May 2010 along with eight other players.

=== Milton Keynes Dons ===
MacKenzie signed for English League One side Milton Keynes Dons on 14 May 2010, having signed a pre-contract deal two months earlier in March.

MacKenzie missed nine fixtures, due to injuries and made his debut for the club, on 21 September 2010, in the third round of League Cup, in a 3–1 loss against Birmingham City after coming on as a half-time substitute. Four days later, he made his league debut, in a 2–1 loss against Peterborough United. On 30 October 2010, MacKenzie received a straight red card after a professional foul, as MK Dons lost 4–2 against Tranmere Rovers. Then on 5 February 2011, MacKenzie sent off again after a second bookable offence, in a 2–2 draw against Sheffield Wednesday. He scored the winning goal against local rivals Peterborough on 21 March 2011. He scored his second goal in three games for the Dons with a header away to play-off rivals Southampton.

In 2011–12 season, MacKenzie made twenty-appearance, but soon would be often used in first team ins and out. On 17 September 2011, he made assist Dean Lewington before being sent-off for stamping on Alan Lee, in a 1–1 draw against Huddersfield Town. After the match, Manager Karl Robinson criticise MacKenzie as "disgrace", believing he deserved to be punished. In the first match of 2012, MacKenzie scored his first 2012-goal, in a 1–0 win over Colchester United, but his goal against Colchester United was later recorded as an own goal by the Football League, eight days later. Several weeks later on 24 January 2012, he scored an own-goal, in a 4–2 loss against Stevenage; then scored another own-goal, in the next game, in a 1–1 draw against Sheffield Wednesday. On 14 February 2012, MacKenzie, once again, sent-off for giving away the penalty and then head-butted Yann Kermorgant. After the match, Robinson was disappointed with his action, though he was sarcastically proud of him "in a weird way for coming out and accepting his punishment." MacKenzine, himself, apologised to teammates and my manager and the fans and regretted his action, something that it's wrong. After serving his four match ban, MacKenzie was since left out of the first team squad throughout March. He made his return on 7 April 2012, in a 1–1 draw against Preston North End.

In 2012–13 season was overshadowed for MacKenzie when he underwent hip surgery, which ruled him out for three months. In late-December, he made a return on the bench, in a 3–2 loss against Coventry City. After making two appearances since his return, MacKenzie soon suffered a knock in a FA Cup fourth match against Queens Park Rangers after playing 20 minutes in the first half, which Milton Keynes Dons won 1–0 to send the club through the next round. After missing two games, MacKenzie made his return from injury. At the end of the 2012–13 season, the club activate it options to keep MacKenzie and was signed on 16 May 2013.

=== Blackpool ===
On 1 March 2013, MacKenzie signed on loan for Blackpool until the end of the season. The day after signing for the club, MacKenzie made his debut in a goalless draw with Bristol City. On 5 July 2013, MacKenzie signed for Blackpool on a permanent deal for an undisclosed fee.

=== Doncaster Rovers ===
On 29 June 2015 MacKenzie signed for Doncaster Rovers on a free transfer. On 1 February 2016 MacKenzie joined Notts County on a one-month loan. He made his début in 2–1 defeat to York City. He made 4 appearances before returning to Doncaster Rovers at the end of his loan spell.

=== St Mirren ===
MacKenzie joined Scottish Championship side St Mirren in June 2016, signing a one-year contract with the club. After establishing himself as a first team regular and scoring 5 goals, MacKenzie agreed a one-year contract extension with the club in May 2017.

Despite suffering from injuries MacKenzie was able to play 18 times for Saints and helped them lift the 2017–18 Scottish Championship title, which lead to him signing a further one-year contract extension in May 2018.

Injury once again led to MacKenzie missing a large part of the following season, after he had to undergo surgery in August 2018. He finally returned to playing in March 2019, and managed to play seven matches to help Saints avoid relegation from the Scottish Premiership. He signed a further one-year contract extension in June 2019.

In June 2020, MacKenzie left Saints when his contract expired.

=== Peterhead ===
MacKenzie joined Peterhead in the summer of 2020, and made seven appearances for the Blue Toon before retiring in March 2021.

== International career ==
MacKenzie was selected for Scotland squads in November 2011 and September 2012.

== Career statistics ==
As of match played 4 December 2019

Appearances and goals by club, season and competition
club	Season	League			National Cup		League Cup		Other		Total	
club	Season	Division	Apps	Goals	Apps	Goals	Apps	Goals	Apps	Goals	Apps	Goals
Rangers	2003–04	Scottish Premier League	2	0	0	0	0	0	0	0	2	0
Dundee	2006–07	First Division	21	0	2	0	1	0	0	0	24	0
Dundee	2007–08	First Division	32	1	1	0	2	0	1 (Note: Appearances in the Scottish Challenge Cup)	0	36	1
Dundee	2008–09	First Division	19	0	0	0	1	0	0	0	20	0
Dundee	2009–10	First Division	25	1	2	0	2	0	1	0	30	1
Dundee	Dundee total		97	2	5	0	6	0	2	0	110	2
MK Dons	2010–11	League One	26	2	1	0	1	0	2 (Note: Appearances in the League One play-offs)	0	30	2
MK Dons	2011–12	League One	26	1	2	0	2	0	2	0	32	1
MK Dons	2012–13	League One	11	0	4	0	2	0	0	0	17	0
MK Dons	MK Dons total		63	3	7	0	5	0	4	0	79	3
Blackpool (loan)	2012–13	Championship	12	2	—		—		—		12	2
Blackpool	2013–14	Championship	35	1	1	0	1	0	—		37	1
Bradford City (loan)	2014–15	League One	12	1	0	0	0	0	0	0	12	1
Doncaster Rovers	2015–16	League One	15	0	1	0	0	0	0	0	16	0
Notts County (loan)	2015–16	League Two	4	0	0	0	0	0	0	0	4	0
St Mirren	2016–17	Scottish Championship	29	5	4	0	0	0	4	0	37	5
St Mirren	2017–18	Scottish Championship	14	1	0	0	4	0	0	0	18	1
St Mirren	2018–19	Scottish Premiership	5	0	0	0	0	0	2 (Note: Two appearances in the Scottish Premiership play-offs)	0	7	0
St Mirren	2019–20	Scottish Premiership	10	0	0	0	2	0	0	0	12	0
St Mirren	St Mirren total		58	6	4	0	6	0	6	0	74	6
Peterhead	2020–21	Scottish League One	6	0	0	0	1	0	0	0	7	0
Career total			297	15	18	0	18	0	12	0	345	15

== Honours ==
Dundee

- Scottish Challenge Cup: 2009–10
