= Kyle Allison =

Scottish footballer (born 1990)

Personal information
- Date of birth: 3 April 1990 (age 36)
- Place of birth: Dunfermline, Scotland
- Position: Goalkeeper

Senior career*
Years	Team	Apps	(Gls)
2007–2008	Cowdenbeath	3	(0)
2009–2010	Inverness Caledonian Thistle	1	(0)
2010–2011	Dunfermline Athletic	1	(0)
2011–2012	Linlithgow Rose		
2012–2014	Ballingry Rovers		
2014–2017	Kelty Hearts		
2017	→ Penicuik Athletic (loan)	7	(0)
2017–2018	Penicuik Athletic	32	(0)
- * Club domestic league appearances and goals

Kyle Allison (born 3 April 1990) is a Scottish former professional goalkeeper who plays for Scottish Junior club Penicuik Athletic. He has played in the Scottish Football League for Cowdenbeath, Inverness Caledonian Thistle and Dunfermline Athletic and in the Juniors for Linlithgow Rose, Ballingry Rovers and Kelty Hearts before joining Penicuik Athletic.

== Career ==
Allison began his career at Cowdenbeath, making his debut aged 16, coming on as a substitute for David Hay after 23 minutes of Cowdenbeath's 4–2 win over Stranraer on 2 December 2006. He left the club in July 2008, after asking to be released from his contract.

Allison then signed for Inverness Caledonian Thistle playing in their under-19 side in his first season, including in their semi-final of the Scottish Youth Cup against Rangers. Unfortunately he had to go off injured after 30 minutes having suffered a double fracture of his jaw, with Inverness going on to lose 6–2. His first team debut came in August 2009, as Inverness beat Annan Athletic 4–0 in the Scottish League Cup. At the end of the 2009–10 season he was released by Inverness.

On 26 May 2010, Allison joined Dunfermline Athletic on a one-year deal. He made his first appearance for the club on 30 October 2010, as a substitute for the injured Chris Smith as Dunfermline beat Stirling Albion 3–0. His only other appearance for Dunfermline came in a Scottish Cup tie away to Aberdeen on 6 February 2011. Dunfermline lost the game 1–0, the goal coming in injury time when Allison tried to clear a cross but punched the ball against his team-mate Neil McGregor's legs and into the net. At the end of his contract he was released by Dunfermline.

On 6 August 2011, Allison was an unused substitute as a trialist for Stenhousemuir against Brechin City. He then signed for Junior club Linlithgow Rose. In July 2012, Allison signed for Ballingry Rovers and then on 20 June 2014, joined Kelty Hearts.
