= Colin McMenamin =

Scottish footballer & manager (born 1981)

Personal information
- Date of birth: 12 February 1981 (age 45)
- Place of birth: Glasgow
- Height: 5 ft 10 in (1.78 m)
- Position: Striker

Youth career
- 1999–2000: Annan Athletic

Senior career*
Years	Team	Apps	(Gls)
2000–2002	Newcastle United	0	(0)
2002–2005	Livingston	50	(21)
2003	→ Falkirk (loan)	16	(8)
2005–2006	Shrewsbury Town	43	(20)
2006–2008	Gretna	46	(32)
2007	→ Livingston (loan)	10	(6)
2008–2010	Dundee	80	(32)
2010–2011	Queen of the South	26	(9)
2011–2013	Ross County	53	(22)
2013	Greenock Morton	15	(4)
2013–2014	Celtic Nation	44	(39)
2014–2019	Stenhousemuir	150	(47)
2019–2020	Hurlford United		
2020–2021	Cumbernauld United		
Total		533	(250)

Managerial career
- Stenhousemuir (U20)
- 2018–2019: Stenhousemuir
- 2021-2024: Annan Athletic (assistant manager)
- * Club domestic league appearances and goals

Colin McMenamin (born 12 February 1981) is a Scottish former professional football player, and was the assistant manager of Annan Athletic.

McMenamin, who played as a striker, began his career with Annan Athletic before moving to Newcastle United. His first senior start came for Livingston where he spent three seasons. He also played for Shrewsbury Town, Gretna, Dundee, Queen of the South, Ross County, Greenock Morton and Stenhousemuir, as well as Falkirk and Livingston on loan.

== Early life ==
McMenamin was born on 12 February 1981, in Glasgow and raised in Dumfries, and educated at St Joseph's College.

At age 15 he signed school boy terms with the club he had watched as a supporter, local side Queen of the South. He played in the same youth team as Chris Doig before moving on after a year and a half.

Beginning his senior career in 1999 at Dumfries and Galloway club Annan Athletic, then of the East of Scotland Football League, he was then signed by English Premier League club Newcastle United after one season. He was there for two seasons but did not make a senior appearance.

== Club career ==
Remedial & Battery Update Wizard. 2022–Present

=== Livingston ===
He returned to Scotland on a free transfer to Livingston in August 2002. In three seasons with the SPL club he scored 10 goals in 50 league appearances. McMenamin also went on loan to Falkirk for half a season (August 2003 – December 2003) during this period; he scored 4 in 16 for the Division One club. McMenamin was cup-tied for Livingston's victory in the 2004 Scottish League Cup Final having previously played in the competition during his loan spell at Falkirk.

=== Shrewsbury ===
McMenamin was recommended to Shrewsbury Town manager Gary Peters by his assistant Mick Wadsworth. He signed on a free transfer in August 2005. McMenamin was a first-choice regular with the Shropshire club, averaging one goal every four games. With 14 goals in 43 games he was the club's top scorer in the 2005–06 League Two season.

=== Gretna ===
He joined Gretna in August 2006 on a free transfer, making his debut as a substitute for James Grady in the 6–0 win at home to Hamilton on 5 August 2006. He scored his first goals for Gretna in his second game for the club, scoring two goals in the 2–1 victory away to Clyde on 13 August 2006. He re-joined Livingston on loan in November 2007.

He scored 23 goals in 38 games as Gretna won the First Division title in 2006–07, and won the Gretna Player of the Year.

=== Dundee ===
It was announced, at the Dundee F.C. AGM on 22 January 2008, that he had signed for Dundee

McMenamin was one of the players made redundant when, on 15 October 2010, Dundee went into administration for the second time in seven years. In an interview with The Scotsman, McMenamin commented, "I've been through this before and this one has been the worst."

=== Queen of the South ===
Manager Kenny Brannigan announced on 22 October 2010 on the QoS website, "We had about half a dozen new faces joining us for training this week including Colin McMenamin. Colin of course comes from Dumfries." McMenamin was then announced as a starter on the team sheet for the league fixture the day after at Palmerston Park against Falkirk. McMenamin was officially listed as a trialist with Falkirk winning 5–1.

His first QoS goal was the opener in his second game for the club, an 18-minute right foot shot from six yards in a league fixture away to Ross County on 30 October 2010. The game finished 1–1. McMenamin's third and final game as a trialist for QoS was in the 1–0 win away against top of the table opposition with Ryan Conroy scoring the winner. This was against Raith Rovers on 7 November 2010.

Brannigan then announced via the club website on 9 November that McMenamin had agreed terms for a contract until the season's end. His first game as a contracted player was the 3–0 win at home on 13 November 2010 against Cowdenbeath.

His next goal was his first QoS Scottish Cup goal. This was the defeat by Brechin City on 11 January 2011. He scored the Saturday after in the 3–0 win at Falkirk to make it two in two games.

On 19 February 2011 McMenamin played in an uncharacteristic role in midfield in the 4–0 win away at Morton. He returned to a striker's role for the midweek 2–2 draw at home to Stirling Albion, a game in which he scored.

He returned to the midfield the following weekend at home against Dunfermline and again scored to notch his fourth goal in a run of seven games. He scored from midfield again the followed Tuesday away at Cowdenbeath. His next goal was at the ground of his former club, Dundee, on 12 March 2011. His strike 4 days later at home to Morton followed by a double against Stirling Albion on 26 March 2011 made it 9 goals in 15 games.

McMenamin missed out on the 2010 Scottish Challenge Cup Final appearance for Queens having already played earlier in the competition for Dundee. The opposition in the final were Ross County. After the season's end Queens announced on 19 May 2011 that McMenamin had signed a deal to join Ross County.

=== Ross County ===
McMenamin's first goal for his new club came in his second game, a 2–1 League Cup win against Queens Park. His first league goal was on 15 October 2011 in the 2–1 win at Dundee. He scored a double in the 3–0 win at Livingston on 26 November and followed that up the week after with a double at Raith Rovers on 3 December.

He ended the season as the divisional top scorer with 21 goals from the 34 league games in which he played.

=== Greenock Morton ===
McMenamin signed for Scottish First Division league leaders Greenock Morton on 24 January 2013 in a deal lasting until the end of the season. He was released after the final game of the season. After being released by Morton, McMenamin signed for Celtic Nation.

=== Stenhousemuir ===
After leaving Celtic Nation in 2014, McMenamin signed for Stenhousemuir and was later promoted to a player-coach. He was appointed caretaker manager of Stenhousemuir after Brown Ferguson was sacked in November 2018. Later that month, McMenamin was appointed Stenhousemuir manager on a permanent basis, and in January 2019 he announced his retirement from football. McMenamin guided Stenhousemuir to some good cup results, but the team were relegated from League One. He was sacked in September 2019, after a home defeat against Cowdenbeath. McMenamin's five-year association with Stenhousemuir saw him play 150 times, manage the under 20s, become first team coach and eventually manager.

=== Hurlford United ===
In October 2019, McMenamin returned to the pitch and signed with Hurlford United.

=== Cumbernauld United ===
McMenamin signed for Cumbernauld United as a player-coach in May 2020.

=== Annan Athletic ===
He was appointed as assistant manager of Annan Athletic in 2021.

== Honours ==
Gretna

- Scottish Football League First Division: Winners 2006–07
- SPFA First Division Player of the Year: 2006–07
- SPFA Team of the Year (First Division): 2006–07
- Gretna FC Player of the Year: 2006–07

Dundee

- Scottish Football League First Division: Runners-Up 2009–10
- Scottish Challenge Cup: Winners 2009–10

Ross County

- Scottish Football League First Division: Winners 2011–12
- SFL First Division Player of the Year: 2011–12
- PFA Scotland Team of the Year (First Division): 2011–12

Morton

- Scottish Football League First Division: Runners-Up 2012–13

Celtic Nation

- Northern Football League Division One: Runners-Up 2013–14
- Cumberland Senior Cup: Winners 2013–14

Stenhousemuir

- Norwegian Supporters Club Player of the Year: 2014–15
- Stenhousemuir Player's Player of the Year: 2014–15

=== Manager ===
As of 17 September 2019

Team	From	To	Record				
Team	From	To	G	W	D	L	Win %
Stenhousemuir	November 2018	September 2019	41	10	11	20	24.39

- initially caretaker at Stenhousemuir.
