= Mickaël Antoine-Curier =

Guadeloupean footballer (born 1983)

Personal information
- Full name: Mickaël Antoine-Curier
- Date of birth: 5 March 1983 (age 43)
- Place of birth: Orsay, France
- Height: 1.83 m (6 ft 0 in)
- Position: Striker

Youth career
- Paris Saint-Germain
- Nice

Senior career*
Years	Team	Apps	(Gls)
2001	Preston North End	0	(0)
2001–2003	Nottingham Forest	0	(0)
2003	→ Brentford (loan)	11	(3)
2003	Oldham Athletic	8	(2)
2003	Kidderminster Harriers	1	(0)
2003	Rochdale	8	(1)
2003–2004	Sheffield Wednesday	1	(0)
2004	Notts County	4	(1)
2004	Grimsby Town	5	(0)
2004–2006	Vard Haugesund	37	(33)
2006–2007	FK Haugesund	39	(15)
2007–2008	Hibernian	13	(3)
2008	→ Dundee (loan)	11	(8)
2008–2010	Dundee	32	(14)
2009–2010	→ Hamilton Academical (loan)	26	(7)
2011	Hamilton Academical	14	(5)
2011	Ermis Aradippou	0	(0)
2011	Ethnikos Achnas	8	(0)
2012–2013	Felda United	20	(13)
2013	FC Atyrau	13	(0)
2013–2015	Hamilton Academical	51	(20)
2015	Burton Albion	5	(0)
2015–2016	Dunfermline Athletic	9	(2)
2016–2017	Union SG	1	(0)
2017	→ Eendracht Aalst (loan)		
2017–2018	Mulhouse	22	(9)
Total		339	(136)

International career
2008–2015	Guadeloupe	16	(6)
- * Club domestic league appearances and goals

Mickaël Antoine-Curier (born 5 March 1983) is a former professional footballer who played as a striker from 2001 until 2018. Born in metropolitan France, he represented Guadeloupe at international level.

Antoine-Curier played in seven countries for twenty two different sides. In England with Preston North End, Nottingham Forest, Brentford, Oldham Athletic, Rochdale, Kidderminster Harriers, Notts County, Grimsby Town and Burton Albion, in Norway for Vard Haugesund and FK Haugesund, in Scotland with Hibernian, Dundee, Hamilton Academical and Dunfermline Athletic, in Cyprus for Ermis Aradippou and Ethnikos Achnas, in Malaysia for Felda United, in Kazakhstan for FC Atyrau, in Belgium for Union SG and Eendracht Aalst and finally in his native France for Mulhouse. Antoine-Curier was capped by the Guadeloupe national team competing in the Caribbean Cup and the CONCACAF Gold Cup.

== Early life ==
Antoine-Curier was born in Orsay, Essonne.

== Club career ==
=== England ===
Antoine-Curier began his career as a youth in France with Paris Saint-Germain and Nice. Eager to play in the United Kingdom, he signed for Preston North End and then Nottingham Forest as a youth. He initially played academy football, finish top scorer for the Forest academy team with 22 goals in 19 games. He won the trophy for the academy player of the year and was selected as man of the match of the Charity Vase final by Brian Clough, but he never made it for the first team. During the 2002–03 season, the Forest manager Paul Hart loaned him out to Brentford, where he made 11 starts, scoring three goals. This included a brace in an important 2–0 victory at Chesterfield.

He came to prominence at the start of the 2003–04 season in the third tier of English football, having signed for Oldham Athletic. He grabbed his first cup goal in a 2–1 defeat at Scunthorpe United, then scored his first league goal for the "Latics" four days later in a 2–2 draw at Sheffield Wednesday's Hillsborough Stadium. He grabbed another goal in a 3–2 home defeat to Blackpool the following week. He made a total of six starts and three substitute appearances for the Boundary Park club, scoring three goals, before being released.

Antoine-Curier then joined Kidderminster Harriers, before joining Rochdale on a non-contract basis. He made five starts and five substitute appearances for Rochdale, scoring on his debut in a 1–1 draw at Lincoln City. He then left Rochdale to join Sheffield Wednesday, a club he had scored against earlier on in the season. He made just one substitute appearance for Wednesday, in a 0–0 draw against Luton Town at Hillsborough.

He then joined Notts County, where he made four starts, scoring in a 3–1 win over Grimsby Town, whom he signed for shortly afterwards. He also made five appearances for Grimsby, but could not score. Both Grimsby and Notts County were relegated at the end of the season.

=== Norway ===
After an unsettled time in the UK, Curier joined Norwegian First Division side Vard Haugesund in 2004. In his first season, he scored seven goals in 16 appearances, but the club was relegated. He scored 27 goals in 21 games in the 2005 season, winning the Norwegian golden boot and the Norwegian Second Division player of the year award. He then transferred to FK Haugesund, and scored eight goals in 24 appearances in the 2006 season and seven goals in 15 appearances in the 2007 season. His time at Norway was a positive one, where he was nicknamed as Batigol and David Trezeguet.

=== Scotland ===
Antoine-Curier was invited by manager John Collins to Scottish Premier League side Hibernian for a trial period in 2007. He starred in a friendly match against First Division side Livingston, scoring four goals in a 5–2 victory. FK Haugesund captain Kevin Nicol, a former Hibernian player, was full of praise for Antoine-Curier, expressing his belief that the French striker "would do really well" if he was signed by Hibs. Curier signed a one-year contract with Hibernian, who paid FK Haugesund a nominal transfer fee, on 31 August 2007. Antoine-Curier scored against Motherwell in the Scottish League Cup and Kilmarnock in the SPL. Despite scoring four goals in nine appearances, Antoine-Curier fell out of favour after Hibs signed Colin Nish.

Curier was loaned by Hibs to Dundee in January 2008. Curier scored six goals in his first four Dundee appearances, including a hat-trick in a 6–1 win over Stirling Albion. On 7 May 2008, Curier signed a three-year deal with Dundee.

Dundee loaned out Antoine-Curier at the end of the 2009 summer transfer window to SPL side Hamilton Academical. Antoine-Curier made his debut against Hibernian in the SPL and marked it with a goal after 12 minutes. On 15 October 2010, Antoine-Curier had his contract terminated by Dundee, a victim of the club entering administration. On 11 January 2011, following a battle with injury, Antoine-Curier re-signed for Hamilton until the end of the season.

=== Cyprus and further afield ===
In July 2011 he signed a two-year deal with Cypriot side Ermis Aradippou, however his contract was terminated due to financial difficulties at the club and he joined Ermis' former president and a host of the club's former players at Ethnikos Achnas in August, just days before the 2011–12 season.

In April 2012, he joined Felda United with his fellow countryman Eddy Viator. He made his league debut on 8 April 2012, scoring a goal in a 2–0 home win over Kedah FA.

In February 2013, Antoine-Curier joined Kazakhstan Premier League club FC Atyrau. However, his time in Kazakhstan was overshadowed where he was an outcast by his team-mates, spat on by opposing fans and refused accommodation because of the colour of his skin. However, the manager at the time, Miodrag Radulović, denies Antoine-Curier's account, claiming that "he never told me these things while in Atyrau".

=== Return to the UK ===
He re-signed for Hamilton in August 2013. In the Scottish League Cup, Antoine-Curier scored his first goal, in a 1–0 win over Kilmarnock. After scoring nine goals in the league, Antoine-Curier scored four goals for the first time in his professional career, as Hamilton thrash 10–2 against Greenock Morton in the last game of the season. However, the win did not guarantee automatic promotion to Scottish Premiership after his former club, Dundee, won at the same day. After the match, Antoine-Curier expressed disappointment not to become Champions, though the scoreline showed Hamilton's desire to reach the Scottish Premiership. Antoine-Curier was released from his contract at Hamilton on 2 February 2015, by mutual consent.

Antoine-Curier joined Burton Albion on 18 February 2015, until the end of the 2014–15 season. Antoine-Curier made his Burton Albion debut, where he came on as a substitute for Stuart Beavon in the 88th minute, in a 3–1 win over Dagenham & Redbridge on 21 February 2015. Following Burton Albion's promotion to League One, Antoine-Curier was released after making five appearances.

In August 2015, Antoine-Curer had a trial with Scottish League One team Dunfermline Athletic, subsequently signing for the Scottish League One side in September 2015. Chances with the Pars, however, were limited and after only four months with the club, Antoine-Curier was released.

=== Later career ===
Following his release Dunfermline, Antoine-Curier subsequently signed for Belgian Second Division side Union SG on an 18-month contract. His time with the club was hindered by a recurring knee-injury, and in January 2017 he was loaned out to Belgian Fourth Division side Eendracht Aalst.

In September 2017, Antoine-Curier signed for National 3 side Mulhouse on a one-year deal.

== Personal life ==
Antoine-Curier now resides in Belgium where he owns his own chauffeur and VIP transportation company called MAC Transport.

== International career ==
Curier was selected by Guadeloupe for the Caribbean Cup 2008, scoring 6 goals in 8 games. He also participated in the 2009 CONCACAF Gold Cup for Guadeloupe, in which they reached the quarter-finals.

== Career statistics ==
Club statistics
Club	Season	League			FA Cup		League Cup		Other		Total	
Club	Season	Division	Apps	Goals	Apps	Goals	Apps	Goals	Apps	Goals	Apps	Goals
Nottingham Forest	2002–03	First Division	0	0	0	0	0	0	0	0	0	0
Brentford (loan)	2002–03	Second Division	11	3	0	0	0	0	0	0	11	3
Oldham Athletic	2003–04	Second Division	8	2	0	0	1	1	0	0	9	3
Kidderminster Harriers	2003–04	Third Division	1	0	0	0	0	0	0	0	1	0
Rochdale	2003–04	Third Division	8	1	0	0	1	0	1	0	10	1
Sheffield Wednesday	2003–04	Second Division	1	0	0	0	0	0	0	0	1	0
Notts County	2003–04	Second Division	4	1	0	0	0	0	0	0	4	1
Grimsby Town	2003–04	Second Division	5	0	0	0	0	0	0	0	5	0
Vard Haugesund	2004	Norwegian First Division	9	5	0	0	0	0	0	0	9	5
Vard Haugesund	2005	2. divisjon	28	28	0	0	0	0	0	0	28	28
Vard Haugesund	Total		37	33	0	0	0	0	0	0	37	33
FK Haugesund	2006	Norwegian First Division	24	8	0	0	0	0	0	0	24	8
FK Haugesund	2007	Norwegian First Division	15	7	0	0	0	0	0	0	15	7
FK Haugesund	Total		39	15	0	0	0	0	0	0	39	15
Hibernian	2007–08	Scottish Premier League	13	3	1	0	1	1	0	0	15	4
Dundee (loan)	2007–08	Scottish First Division	11	8	0	0	0	0	0	0	11	8
Dundee	2008–09	Scottish First Division	32	14	1	0	1	0	0	0	34	14
Dundee	2009–10	Scottish First Division	0	0	0	0	1	2	1	1	2	3
Dundee	Dundee total		43	22	1	0	2	2	1	1	47	25
Hamilton Academical (loan)	2009–10	Scottish Premier League	26	7	2	1	0	0	0	0	28	8
Hamilton Academical	2010–11	Scottish Premier League	13	4	1	1	0	0	0	0	14	5
Hamilton Academical	Hamilton Academical total		39	11	3	2	0	0	0	0	42	13
Ermis Aradippou	2011–12	Cypriot First Division	0	0	0	0	0	0	0	0	0	0
Ethnikos Achna	2011–12	Cypriot First Division	8	0	0	0	0	0	0	0	8	0
Felda United	2012	Malaysia Super League	20	13	0	0	0	0	0	0	20	13
FC Atyrau	2013	Kazakhstan Premier League	13	0	0	0	0	0	0	0	13	0
Hamilton Academical	2013–14	Scottish Championship	29	12	1	0	2	1	4	0	36	13
Hamilton Academical	2014–15	Scottish Premiership	22	8	1	0	2	0	0	0	25	8
Hamilton Academical	Total		51	20	2	0	4	1	4	0	62	21
Burton Albion	2014–15	League Two	5	0	0	0	0	0	0	0	5	0
Dunfermline Athletic	2015–16	Scottish League One	9	2	0	0	0	0	0	0	9	2
Union SG	2015–16	Belgian Second Division	1	0	0	0	0	0	0	0	1	0
Mulhouse	2017–18	Championnat National 3	7	2	1	0	0	0	0	0	8	2
Career total			323	128	7	2	9	5	6	1	346	136
