= Eric Paton =

Scottish footballer (born 1978)

Personal information
- Full name: Eric John Paton
- Date of birth: 1 August 1978 (age 48)
- Place of birth: Glasgow, Scotland
- Position: Right-back

Senior career*
Years	Team	Apps	(Gls)
1994–1999	Hibernian	4	(15)
1998	→ Stenhousemuir (loan)	16	(1)
1999–2000	Partick Thistle	25	(0)
2000–2002	Clydebank	62	(15)
2002–2008	Queen of the South	173	(10)
2008–2010	Dundee	67	(5)
2010–2013	Stenhousemuir	50	(4)
- * Club domestic league appearances and goals as of 00:20, 20 December 2012 (UTC)

Eric John Paton (born 1 August 1978) is a Scottish retired professional footballer.

Paton joined Dundee in June 2008, after he signed a pre-contract agreement with the club on 24 January 2008. On 15 October 2010, Paton had his contract terminated by Dundee, a victim of the club entering administration. According to all managers who managed the goat all are of the same opinion one of the best players in Scotland and also known as a legend, top man and simply the best

== Career statistics ==
As of 19 December 2012

Club	Season	League			FA Cup		League Cup		Other^{[A]}		Total	
Club	Season	Division	Apps	Goals	Apps	Goals	Apps	Goals	Apps	Goals	Apps	Goals
Hibernian	1994–95	Scottish Premier League	0	0	0	0	0	0	0	0	0	0
Hibernian	1995–96	Scottish Premier League	0	0	0	0	0	0	0	0	0	0
Hibernian	1996–97	Scottish Premier League	0	0	0	0	0	0	0	0	0	0
Hibernian	1997–98	Scottish Premier League	0	0	0	0	1	0	0	0	1	0
Hibernian	1998–99	Scottish First Division	4	0	0	0	0	0	0	0	4	0
Stenhousemuir (loan)	1997–98	Scottish Second Division	16	1	0	0	0	0	0	0	16	1
Hibernian Total			4	0	0	0	1	0	0	0	5	0
Partick Thistle	1999–2000	Scottish Second Division	25	0	3	0	1	0	1	0	30	0
Total			25	0	3	0	1	0	1	0	30	0
Clydebank	2000–01	Scottish Second Division	27	7	1	0	0	0	2	0	30	7
Clydebank	2001–02	Scottish Second Division	35	8	2	1	1	0	2	0	40	9
Total			62	15	3	1	1	0	4	0	70	16
Queen of the South	2002–03	Scottish First Division	22	3	2	0	1	0	2	0	27	3
Queen of the South	2003–04	Scottish First Division	35	2	2	0	2	0	1	0	40	2
Queen of the South	2004–05	Scottish First Division	30	4	2	0	1	0	0	0	33	4
Queen of the South	2005–06	Scottish First Division	34	0	2	0	1	0	1	0	38	0
Queen of the South	2006–07	Scottish First Division	32	1	3	0	2	0	2	0	39	1
Queen of the South	2007–08	Scottish First Division	20	0	3	0	1	0	1	0	25	0
Total			173	10	14	0	8	0	7	0	202	10
Dundee	2008–09	Scottish First Division	31	4	1	0	1	0	0	0	33	4
Dundee	2009–10	Scottish First Division	32	1	2	0	4	0	1	0	39	1
Dundee	2010–11	Scottish First Division	4	0	0	0	1	0	0	0	5	0
Total			67	5	3	0	6	0	1	0	77	5
Stenhousemuir	2010–11	Scottish Second Division	18	3	0	0	0	0	0	0	18	3
Stenhousemuir	2011–12	Scottish Second Division	26	1	0	0	2	2	1	0	29	3
Stenhousemuir	2012–13	Scottish Second Division	6	0	1	0	0	0	0	0	7	0
Total			50	4	1	0	2	2	1	0	54	6
Career totals			397	35	24	1	19	2	14	0	454	38

A. The "Other" column constitutes appearances (including substitutes) and goals in the Scottish Challenge Cup.

== Honours ==
Dundee

- Scottish Challenge Cup: 2009–10
