= Eddie Malone =

Scottish footballer (born 1985)

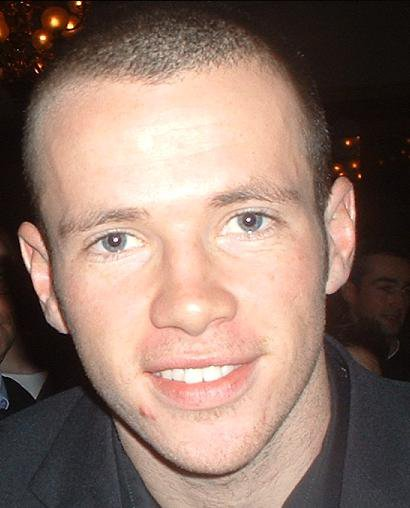

Personal information
- Full name: Edward Joseph Malone
- Date of birth: 6 April 1985 (age 41)
- Place of birth: Edinburgh, Scotland
- Height: 5 ft 11 in (1.80 m)
- Positions: Defender; midfielder

Senior career*
Years	Team	Apps	(Gls)
2002–2004	St Johnstone	13	(1)
2004–2007	Clyde	77	(2)
2007–2008	St Mirren	6	(0)
2007	→ Dundee (loan)	8	(0)
2008–2010	Dundee	92	(2)
2010	Greenock Morton (trial)	1	(0)
2010	Berwick Rangers (trial)	1	(0)
2010–2012	Ayr United	53	(5)
2012–2013	Raith Rovers	43	(0)
2013–2014	Stenhousemuir	28	(3)
2015–2017	Spartans	?	(?)
2017–2019	Forfar Athletic	45	(1)
2019–2021	East Stirlingshire	26	(0)
- * Club domestic league appearances and goals as of 16:11, 7 December 2020 (UTC)

Edward Joseph Malone (born 6 April 1985) is a Scottish association football player, who plays for East Stirlingshire.

Malone has also been on the books of many other Scottish clubs, as well as playing trial league matches with Greenock Morton and Berwick Rangers. Malone was born in Edinburgh and started his senior career with St Johnstone. He then played for Clyde and became the vice-captain of the team. He signed a contract with SPL club St Mirren on 30 January 2007 and then moved to Dundee for a month-long loan in November of that year. This turned into a permanent position in January 2008. He was released by the club on 4 May 2010 with eight other players. Malone played for Raith Rovers for the 2012–13 seasons and for Stenhousemuir for the 2013–14 season.

== Career ==
Malone, who was born in Edinburgh, played alongside current Scotland internationalist Scott Brown and against Republic of Ireland internationalist Aiden McGeady during his youth career. He began his senior career with St Johnstone where he made a dozen or so appearances and scored once against Queen of the South.

Malone left St Johnstone and headed to Clyde in a swap deal for Kevin Fotheringham. Malone made his Clyde debut in a goalless draw against St Mirren in the Scottish Football League First Division in September 2004. Malone went on to become an integral part of the team, fulfilling a variety of positions, including central defence, central midfield, and his favored left wing back position. Malone was only one of four players that survived the clear-out of summer 2005. In 2005–06, under new manager Graham Roberts, Malone hit the peak of his form. Malone scored the winning goal in Clyde's remarkable Scottish Cup victory over giants Celtic.

Malone signed a contract with Scottish Premier League club St Mirren on 30 January 2007. In November 2007, he joined Dundee in a month-long loan. Malone signed for Dundee permanently in January 2008 on a two-and-a-half-year contract., but was released by the club on 4 May 2010 along with 8 other players.

He appeared as a trialist in league games for Greenock Morton and Berwick Rangers. On 18 September 2010, Malone was listed as a trialist for Second Division club Ayr United in their 3–2 away victory over East Fife, completing the whole game. He then signed a contract at Somerset Park scoring his first goal for Ayr against Livingston.

On 16 May 2012, Malone signed a pre contract agreement with Raith Rovers after impressing then manager John McGlynn. Despite McGlynn leaving to manage Hearts, Malone joined Raith for the 2012–13 season. In May 2013, he was freed by Raith Rovers. For the 2013–14 season, Malone signed up with Stenhousemuir.

In January 2015, Malone signed for Lowland Football League side Spartans. He moved to Forfar Athletic for a "modest fee" in January 2017.

Malone returned to play in the Lowland league in 2019 with East Stirlingshire F.C. Malone started regularly at centre-back for most of the 2019–20 season, and was appointed vice-captain to Nicky Low for the 2020–21 season.

== Honours ==
Clyde

- Scottish Challenge Cup
  - Runner-up: 2006–07

Dundee

- Scottish First Division
  - Runner-up: 2009–10
- Scottish Challenge Cup
  - Winner: 2009–10

Ayr United

- Scottish Second Division
  - Runner-up: 2010–11

== See also ==
- 2004–05 Clyde F.C. season | 2005–06 | 2006–07
- 2010–11 Greenock Morton F.C. season
