= Stewart Devine =

Scottish footballer

Personal information
- Full name: Stewart Devine
- Date of birth: 11 April 1984 (age 42)
- Place of birth: Edinburgh, Scotland
- Position: Defender

Senior career*
Years	Team	Apps	(Gls)
1999–2010	Stirling Albion	291	(18)
2011–2012	Stranraer	4	(0)
2011–2012	→ Bo'ness United (loan)	3	(1)
2012–2017	Bo'ness United	137	(19)
2017–2018	Linlithgow Rose	35	(1)
2018–2020	Blackburn United	44	(5)

Managerial career
- 2021-2022: Bathgate Thistle
- * Club domestic league appearances and goals as of 05:00, 14 November 2020 (UTC)

Stewart Devine (born 11 April 1984 in Edinburgh) is a Scottish professional footballer who plays as a defender. During his career, Devine has played with Stirling Albion and with Stranraer, from where he had a spell on loan with Bo'ness United, joining the Newtown Park side permanently before moving to Linlithgow Rose.

Devine started his career at the age of 16 after progressing through the Stirling Albion youth system. Devine made over 140 appearances for Albion since his debut against Stenhousemuir on 2 January 2001. Devine scored his first goal of his professional career against Albion Rovers on 11 August 2001. In the 2006–07 season, Devine helped Stirling Albion gain promotion from the Scottish Second Division with his only goal of the season in the Scottish First Division play-off final against Airdrie United on 12 May 2007 at the Excelsior Stadium. Devine was released in October 2010, after playing for Albion for a decade.

He subsequently signed for Stranraer in July 2011 but was loaned out to Bo'ness United just two months later, this spell was cut short by injury and he was released in February 2012.

After then signing permanently with Bo'ness United and spending several seasons at Newtown Park Devine moved to local rivals Linlithgow Rose before signing for East of Scotland Football League Premier Division side Blackburn United at the beginning of the 2018–19 season.
