= List of Scottish football transfers 2007–08 =

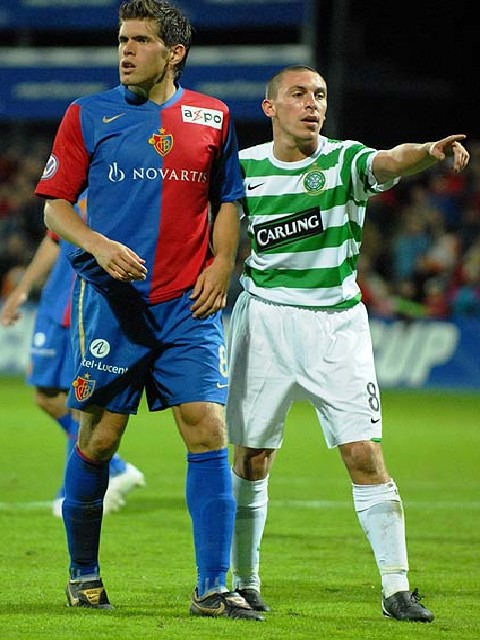
The £4.4m transfer of Scott Brown (right) from Hibernian to Celtic was a record transfer fee between Scottish clubs.

This is a list of Scottish football transfers for the 2007–08 season. Only moves featuring at least one 2007–08 Scottish Premier League club or one 2007–08 Scottish First Division club are listed.

The summer transfer window ran from the end of the 2006–07 season and closed on 31 August. The mid-season transfer window opened on 1 January 2008, and run for the entire month, until 31 January. Players without a club could join one, either during or in between transfer windows.

Two records were broken during the summer transfer window. Scott Brown's £4.4m transfer to Celtic from Hibernian was a record transfer between Scottish clubs, exceeding the £4m transfer of Duncan Ferguson from Dundee United to Rangers in 1993 – a then British record. Also Craig Gordon's move from Hearts to Sunderland made him the most expensive British goalkeeper.

Rangers spent the most money during the summer window, spending a total of £10.32m on fourteen players with Celtic spending £8.2m on six players. The only other significant transfer fees paid by a Scottish club was Hearts who paid FC Terek Grozny £500,000 for Laryea Kingston and the same amount to Sheffield United for Christian Nadé.

== May 2007 – December 2007 ==
Date	Name	Moving from	Moving to	Fee
7 May 2007	Barry John Corr	Queen of the South	Ayr United	Free
8 May 2007	Ally Ridgers	Clachnacuddin	Inverness Caledonian Thistle	Free
12 May 2007	John Baird	St Mirren	Montrose	Free
16 May 2007	Jonathan Kurrant	Charlton Athletic	Aberdeen	Free
18 May 2007	Jeroen Lambers	Falkirk	Veendam	Free
18 May 2007	Jackie McNamara	Wolverhampton Wanderers	Aberdeen	Free
18 May 2007	Michael Mullen	Queen of the South	Stranraer	Free
22 May 2007	Karl Dodd	Falkirk	Wellington Phoenix	Free
23 May 2007	Murray Henderson	Queen of the South	Ayr United	Free
24 May 2007	Kevin McBride	Motherwell	Darlington	Free
25 May 2007	John Paul McBride	Stenhousemuir	Stirling Albion	Free
25 May 2007	Jason Scotland	St Johnstone	Swansea City	Nominal fee
30 May 2007	Jeffrey de Visscher	De Graafschap	Aberdeen	Free
30 May 2007	Łukasz Załuska	Korona Kielce	Dundee United	Nominal fee
31 May 2007	Kenny Arthur	Partick Thistle	Accrington Stanley	Free
31 May 2007	David O'Brien	Stirling Albion	Dundee	Free
31 May 2007	Bobby Olejnik	Aston Villa	Falkirk	Free
31 May 2007	David Weatherston	Queen's Park	St Johnstone	Free
31 May 2007	David Worrell	Rotherham United	Dundee	Free
1 June 2007	Tony Bullock	St Mirren	Ross County	Free
1 June 2007	Derek Fleming	Hamilton Academical	Alloa Athletic	Free
1 June 2007	Stuart Golabek	Inverness Caledonian Thistle	Ross County	Free
1 June 2007	Alan Gow	Falkirk	Rangers	Free
1 June 2007	Craig Hinchliffe	St Mirren	Partick Thistle	Free
1 June 2007	Ryan McStay	Falkirk	Partick Thistle	Free
1 June 2007	Marc Twaddle	Falkirk	Partick Thistle	Free
2 June 2007	Darren Gribben	Forfar Athletic	Stirling Albion	Free
4 June 2007	Scott Gemmill	St Mirren	Berwick Rangers	Free
6 June 2007	Paul Murray	Carlisle United	Gretna	Free
7 June 2007	Dyron Daal	Aberdeen	St Johnstone	Free
7 June 2007	Bryn Halliwell	St Johnstone	Hamilton Academical	Free
7 June 2007	Laryea Kingston	Terek Grozny	Heart of Midlothian	£500,000
7 June 2007	Graham Weir	Queen of the South	Raith Rovers	Free
8 June 2007	Derek Lilley	St Johnstone	Stirling Albion	Free
8 June 2007	Neil MacFarlane	Gretna	Queen of the South	Free
12 June 2007	Scott Agnew	Hamilton Academical	Alloa Athletic	Free
12 June 2007	Brown Ferguson	Partick Thistle	Alloa Athletic	Free
12 June 2007	Willo Flood	Cardiff City	Dundee United	Loan
12 June 2007	Sandy Hodge	Partick Thistle	Alloa Athletic	Free
12 June 2007	Neil Lennon	Celtic	Nottingham Forest	Free
12 June 2007	Abdul Osman	Maidenhead United	Gretna	Free
12 June 2007	Dougie Wilson	Stirling Albion	Alloa Athletic	Free
13 June 2007	Jamie Adams	Kilmarnock	Queen of the South	Loan
13 June 2007	David McCracken	Dundee United	Wycombe Wanderers	Free
14 June 2007	Michael Higdon	Crewe Alexandra	Falkirk	Free
15 June 2007	Jamie McCunnie	Dunfermline Athletic	Hartlepool United	Free
18 June 2007}	Stevie Murray	Kilmarnock	Partick Thistle	Free
19 June 2007	Simon Mensing	St Johnstone	Motherwell	Free
21 June 2007	Barry Callaghan	Dundee United	Brechin City	Free
21 June 2007	Kenny Haswell	Aberdeen	Dumbarton	Free
21 June 2007	Kieran McAnespie	Alloa Athletic	Greenock Morton	Undisclosed
22 June 2007	Gavin Rae	Rangers	Cardiff City	Free
23 June 2007	Andy Ferguson	Clyde	Alloa Athletic	Free
25 June 2007	Simon Brown	Hibernian	Brentford	Free
25 June 2007	Fabian Yantorno	Miramar Misiones	Gretna	Free
26 June 2007	Torben Joneleit	AS Monaco	Hibernian	Loan
26 June 2007	Collin Samuel	Dundee United	Toronto	Undisclosed
27 June 2007	Russell Anderson	Aberdeen	Sunderland	£1,000,000
27 June 2007	DaMarcus Beasley	PSV Eindhoven	Rangers	£700,000
27 June 2007	Yves Ma-Kalambay	Chelsea	Hibernian	£100,000
27 June 2007	Graeme Smith	Kilmarnock	Rangers	Free
27 June 2007	Ivan Sproule	Hibernian	Bristol City	£500,000
27 June 2007	John Sutton	St Mirren	Wycombe Wanderers	Free
27 June 2007	Karl Svensson	Rangers	Caen	£700,000
28 June 2007	Craig Dargo	Inverness Caledonian Thistle	St Mirren	Free
28 June 2007	Massimo Donati	Milan	Celtic	£3,000,000
28 June 2007	Will Haining	Oldham Athletic	St Mirren	Free
28 June 2007	Jakub Hottek	Viktoria Zizkov	Livingston	Free
28 June 2007	Mark Howard	Cardiff City	St Mirren	Free
28 June 2007	Gary Mason	Dunfermline Athletic	St Mirren	Free
28 June 2007	Jamie McCluskey	Hibernian	St Johnstone	Free
29 June 2007	Gary Dempsey	Aberdeen	Yeovil Town	Free
29 June 2007	Mariusz Liberda	Zaglebie Lubin	Livingston	Free
29 June 2007	David McKenna	St Mirren	Stirling Albion	Free
30 June 2007	Michael Stewart	Hibernian	Heart of Midlothian	Free
1 July 2007	Kirk Broadfoot	St Mirren	Rangers	Free
1 July 2007	Scott Brown	Hibernian	Celtic	£4,400,000
1 July 2007	Don Cowie	Ross County	Inverness Caledonian Thistle	Free
1 July 2007	Jean-Claude Darcheville	Bordeaux	Rangers	Free
1 July 2007	Darren Dods	Inverness Caledonian Thistle	Dundee United	Free
1 July 2007	Clayton Donaldson	York City	Hibernian	Free
1 July 2007	Brian Kerr	Motherwell	Hibernian	Free
1 July 2007	Chris Killen	Hibernian	Celtic	Free
1 July 2007	Alan Main	Gretna	St Johnstone	Free
1 July 2007	Lee Mair	Dundee United	Aberdeen	Free
1 July 2007	Scott McDonald	Motherwell	Celtic	£700,000
1 July 2007	Kevin McGowne	St Mirren	Montrose	Free
1 July 2007	Alan O'Brien	Newcastle United	Hibernian	£200,000
2 July 2007	Shelton Martis	Hibernian	West Bromwich Albion	£50,000
3 July 2007	Craig Beattie	Celtic	West Bromwich Albion	£1,250,000
3 July 2007	Julien Brellier	Heart of Midlothian	Norwich City	Free
3 July 2007	Chris Porter	Oldham Athletic	Motherwell	Free
4 July 2007	Craig Bryson	Clyde	Kilmarnock	Undisclosed
4 July 2007	Kevin Davison	Gretna	Hamilton Academical	Free
4 July 2007	David Marshall	Celtic	Norwich City	£750,000
4 July 2007	Dean McDonald	Gillingham	Inverness Caledonian Thistle	Undisclosed
4 July 2007	Mark Tinkler	Hartlepool United	Livingston	Free
5 July 2007	Frédéric Daquin	Dunfermline Athletic	Dundee	Free
5 July 2007	Sam Morrow	Hibernian	Derry City	Free
6 July 2007	Carlos Cuéllar	Osasuna	Rangers	£2,370,000
6 July 2007	Dorus de Vries	Dunfermline Athletic	Swansea City	Free
6 July 2007	John O'Neil	Gretna	Cowdenbeath	Free
6 July 2007	Alex Williams	Clyde	Ayr United	Free
7 July 2007	Roy Carroll	West Ham United	Rangers	Free
7 July 2007	Kevin Harper	Stoke City	Dunfermline Athletic	Free
7 July 2007	Jan Žemlík	Tescoma Zlín	Dundee	Free
10 July 2007	David Armstrong	Heart of Midlothian	Cowdenbeath	Loan
10 July 2007	John Armstrong	Heart of Midlothian	Cowdenbeath	Loan
10 July 2007	David Bingham	Gretna	Queen of the South	Loan
10 July 2007	Stephen Grindlay	Dumbarton	Queen of the South	Free
10 July 2007	Jamie MacDonald	Heart of Midlothian	Queen of the South	Loan
10 July 2007	Marco Michetschlage	Admira Wacker	Rangers	Loan
10 July 2007	Marco Pelosi	Heart of Midlothian	Raith Rovers	Loan
10 July 2007	Lee Robinson	Rangers	Greenock Morton	Loan
10 July 2007	Craig Sives	Heart of Midlothian	Dundee	Loan
10 July 2007	Nathan Wright	Gretna	Darlington	Free
11 July 2007	Lee McCulloch	Wigan Athletic	Rangers	£2,500,000
11 July 2007	Andy Tod	Dunfermline Athletic	Raith Rovers	Free
12 July 2007	Kevin McDonald	Hibernian	Airdrie United	Free
14 July 2007	Stuart Soane	Inverness Caledonian Thistle	Peterhead	Free
16 July 2007	Milan Páleník	Dukla Banská Bystrica	Dundee	Free
17 July 2007	Marius Niculae	Mainz	Inverness Caledonian Thistle	Free
17 July 2007	Stephen Glass	Hibernian	Dunfermline Athletic	Free
17 July 2007	Arnau Riera	Sunderland	Falkirk	Loan
18 July 2007	Robert Campbell	Kilmarnock	Dumbarton	Loan
18 July 2007	Willie Soutar	Motherwell	Airdrie United	Free
18 July 2007	John Stewart	Falkirk	St Johnstone	Loan
20 July 2007	Prince Bauben	Unattached	Dundee United	Free
20 July 2007	Brian Gilmour	Clyde	Queen of the South	Free
20 July 2007	Bob Harris	Clyde	Queen of the South	Nominal fee
20 July 2007	Neil McGowan	Airdrie United	Queen of the South	Free
20 July 2007	Ryan Russell	Greenock Morton	Dumbarton	Free
21 July 2007	Scott Gates	Dundee	Montrose	Loan
21 July 2007	Steven Watson	Dundee	Forfar Athletic	Free
22 July 2007	Gary Harkins	Grimsby Town	Partick Thistle	Free
23 July 2007	Thierry Gathuessi	Sete	Hibernian	Free
23 July 2007	Gordon Greer	Kilmarnock	Doncaster Rovers	Free
24 July 2007	Raymond Jellema	Hamilton Academical	Alloa Athletic	Free
24 July 2007	David Rowson	Boston United	Partick Thistle	Free
24 July 2007	Derek Young	St Johnstone	Aberdeen	Free
25 July 2007	Neil Janczyk	St Johnstone	Brechin City	Free
25 July 2007	Calum Smith	Dunfermline Athletic	Brechin City	Free
25 July 2007	Grzegorz Szamotulski	Sturm Graz	Dundee United	Free
26 July 2007	Derek Stillie	Dundee United	Gillingham	Free
27 July 2007	Gerrard Aafjes	Volendam	Falkirk	Free
28 July 2007	Filipe Morais	Millwall	Hibernian	Free
28 July 2007	Ryan McCann	Clyde	Bohemians	Free
29 July 2007	Libor Sionko	Rangers	Copenhagen	Undisclosed
30 July 2007	Darren Smith	Hibernian	Airdrie United	Free
31 July 2007	Ričardas Beniušis	Kaunas	Heart of Midlothian	Loan
31 July 2007	Audrius Ksanavičius	Kaunas	Heart of Midlothian	Loan
31 July 2007	Rubén Palazuelos	Gimnàstic de Tarragona	Heart of Midlothian	Free
1 August 2007	John Fraser	Stirling Albion	Forfar Athletic	Free
1 August 2007	Mark McChrystal	Partick Thistle	Derry City	Free
1 August 2007	Jani Šturm	Gorica	Dundee	Free
1 August 2007	Steven Whittaker	Hibernian	Rangers	£2,000,000
2 August 2007	Craig Potter	Airdrie United	Clyde	Free
2 August 2007	Jay Shields	Hibernian	Greenock Morton	Free
2 August 2007	Christian Smith	Port Vale	Clyde	Free
2 August 2007	Andrew Traub	Celtic	Clyde	Free
3 August 2007	Matthew Berkeley	Gretna	Altrincham	Free
3 August 2007	Tomas Cerny	Sigma Olomouc	Hamilton Academical	Free
3 August 2007	Stephen Connor	Everton	Partick Thistle	Loan
3 August 2007	Jamie Mole	Heart of Midlothian	Queen of the South	Loan
3 August 2007	Tim Krul	Newcastle United	Falkirk	Loan
3 August 2007	Roman Wallner	Austria Vienna	Falkirk	Free
4 August 2007	Mark Birch	Gretna	Northwich Victoria	Free
4 August 2007	Craig James	Darlington	Livingston	Free
4 August 2007	Jason Kennedy	Middlesbrough	Livingston	Loan
6 August 2007	Marvyn Wilson	Hamilton Academical	Clyde	Free
7 August 2007	Simon Storey	Melbourne Victory	Partick Thistle	Free
8 August 2007	Roddy Hunter	Clyde	Albion Rovers	Free
8 August 2007	Craig Gordon	Heart of Midlothian	Sunderland	£9,000,000
9 August 2007	Aurelien Collin	Real Mallorca	Gretna	Free
9 August 2007	Daniel Cousin	Lens	Rangers	£1,500,000
10 August 2007	Franco Miranda	Helsingborgs IF	St Mirren	Free
10 August 2007	Patrick Noubissie	Swindon Town	Hibernian	Free
10 August 2007	Patrick Noubissie	Hibernian	Livingston	Loan
11 August 2007	Jean-Joël Perrier-Doumbé	Stade Rennais	Celtic	Free
12 August 2007	Alan Gilbride	Greenock Morton	Stenhousemuir	Loan
12 August 2007	Marc McCusker	Heart of Midlothian	Stranraer	Loan
14 August 2007	Ross Harris	Dundee	Stirling Albion	Free
14 August 2007	Niall Henderson	Gretna	Dumbarton	Loan
14 August 2007	Paul Murphy	Stenhousemuir	Stirling Albion	Free
14 August 2007	Steven Watt	Swansea City	Inverness Caledonian Thistle	Loan
15 August 2007	Mirsad Bešlija	Heart of Midlothian	Sint-Truidense	Loan
15 August 2007	Lee Matthews	Crewe Alexandra	Livingston	Free
16 August 2007	Paul Mathers	East Fife	St Mirren	Free
16 August 2007	Kevin McKinlay	Ross County	Partick Thistle	Undisclosed
16 August 2007	Damien Rascle	Unattached	Kilmarnock	Free
17 August 2007	Paul Keegan	Motherwell	Partick Thistle	Free
17 August 2007	Adam Virgo	Celtic	Colchester United	Loan
20 August 2007	Scott Fox	Celtic	East Fife	Loan
20 August 2007	Paul Gallacher	Norwich City	Dunfermline Athletic	Loan
23 August 2007	Filip Šebo	Rangers	Valenciennes	Loan
24 August 2007	Paul Di Giacomo	Kilmarnock	Partick Thistle	Loan
24 August 2007	Ian Murray	Rangers	Norwich City	Free
24 August 2007	Ryan Jarvis	Norwich City	Kilmarnock	Loan
27 August 2007	Mickaël Buscher	Nice	Gretna	Free
28 August 2007	Luca Santonocito	Inter Milan	Celtic	Free
28 August 2007	Marco Andreoni	Dundee United	Montrose	Loan
28 August 2007	William Easton	Dundee United	Stirling Albion	Loan
28 August 2007	Jordan Robertson	Sheffield United	Dundee United	Loan
30 August 2007	Joe Cardle	Port Vale	Clyde	Loan
30 August 2007	Kenny Deuchar	Gretna	St Johnstone	Loan
30 August 2007	Thomas Gravesen	Celtic	Everton	Loan
31 August 2007	Sone Aluko	Birmingham City	Aberdeen	Loan
31 August 2007	Mickaël Antoine-Curier	Haugesund	Hibernian	Undisclosed
31 August 2007	Anthony Basso	Auxerre	Heart of Midlothian	Free
31 August 2007	Roman Bednář	Heart of Midlothian	West Bromwich Albion	Loan
31 August 2007	Thomas Kind Bendiksen	Harstad IL	Rangers	Undisclosed
31 August 2007	Chris Birchall	Coventry City	St Mirren	Loan
31 August 2007	Matthew Doherty	Heart of Midlothian	Cowdenbeath	Loan
31 August 2007	Amdy Faye	Charlton Athletic	Rangers	Loan
31 August 2007	Michael Gardyne	Celtic	Greenock Morton	Free
31 August 2007	Lewis Grabban	Crystal Palace	Motherwell	Loan
31 August 2007	Evan Horwood	Sheffield United	Gretna	Loan
31 August 2007	Stephen Hughes	Leicester City	Motherwell	Undisclosed
31 August 2007	Dan Kirkup	Carlisle United	Clyde	Loan
31 August 2007	Paul Lawson	Celtic	Ross County	Free
31 August 2007	Zbigniew Małkowski	Hibernian	Inverness Caledonian Thistle	Loan
31 August 2007	Alan Martin	Motherwell	Leeds United	Undisclosed
31 August 2007	Phil McGuire	Dunfermline Athletic	Inverness Caledonian Thistle	Loan
31 August 2007	Denis McLaughlin	Heart of Midlothian	Gimnástica de Torrelavega	Undisclosed
31 August 2007	Kenny Miller	Celtic	Derby County	£2,300,000
31 August 2007	Christian Nadé	Sheffield United	Heart of Midlothian	£500,000
31 August 2007	Steven Naismith	Kilmarnock	Rangers	£1,900,000
31 August 2007	David Proctor	Dundee United	Inverness Caledonian Thistle	Free
31 August 2007	Rocco Quinn	Celtic	St Johnstone	Loan
31 August 2007	Craig Reid	Celtic	Stirling Albion	Loan
31 August 2007	Ally Ridgers	Inverness Caledonian Thistle	Elgin City	Loan
31 August 2007	Iain Russell	Brechin City	Greenock Morton	Undisclosed
31 August 2007	Jonathan Smith	Wigan Athletic	Aberdeen	Free
31 August 2007	Zander Sutherland	Inverness Caledonian Thistle	Elgin City	Loan
31 August 2007	Elias Wagner	Hibernian	Heart of Midlothian	Free
14 September 2007	Dusan Bestvina	Unattached	Clyde	Free
15 September 2007	Colin Scott	Unattached	Gretna	Free
21 September 2007	Evangelino Valentim	Unattached	Clyde	Free
22 September 2007	Adam Coakley	Greenock Morton	Alloa Athletic	Loan
22 September 2007	Willie Dyer	St Johnstone	Brechin City	Loan
28 September 2007	Neil McCallum	St Johnstone	Forfar Athletic	Loan
5 October 2007	Martyn Corrigan	Motherwell	Dundee	Loan
5 October 2007	Ryan Wilkie	Unattached	Clyde	Free
6 October 2007	Bobby Linn	Greenock Morton	East Fife	Loan
19 October 2007	Alistair Brown	Hibernian	Stenhousemuir	Loan
19 October 2007	Steven Doris	St Johnstone	Montrose	Loan
19 October 2007	Gordon Lennon	Partick Thistle	Stenhousemuir	Loan
19 October 2007	David Nixon	Motherwell	Queen of the South	Loan
19 October 2007	Mehdi Taouil	Unattached	Kilmarnock	Free
19 October 2007	Andrew Traub	Clyde	Cowdenbeath	Free
26 October 2007	Greg Cameron	Dundee United	Partick Thistle	Loan
2 November 2007	David Goodwillie	Dundee United	Raith Rovers	Loan
2 November 2007	Eddie Malone	St Mirren	Dundee	Loan
2 November 2007	Danny Murphy	Motherwell	Dunfermline Athletic	Loan
2 November 2007	Julius Raliukonis	Unattached	Livingston	Free
3 November 2007	Pedram Ardalany	Unattached	Partick Thistle	Free
5 November 2007	Chris Mitchell	Falkirk	Montrose	Loan
8 November 2007	Henry Makinwa	Unattached	Gretna	Free
9 November 2007	Ryan Baldacchino	Gretna	Ayr United	Loan
9 November 2007	Sean Kerr	Livingston	Dumbarton	Loan
9 November 2007	Colin McMenamin	Gretna	Livingston	Loan
10 December 2007	Stephen Bradley	Drogheda United	Falkirk	Unconfirmed
31 December 2007	Kevin McBride	Darlington	Falkirk	Unconfirmed

== January 2008 – April 2008 ==
Date	Name	Moving from	Moving to	Fee
1 January 2008	Danny Swanson	Berwick Rangers	Dundee United	£40,000
1 January 2008	Danny Grainger	Gretna	Dundee United	£15,000
1 January 2008	Alan Morgan	Inverness Caledonian Thistle	Kilmarnock	Free
4 January 2008	Andreas Hinkel	Sevilla	Celtic	£1,900,000
4 January 2008	Eddie Malone	St Mirren	Dundee	Undisclosed
4 January 2008	Martyn Corrigan	Motherwell	Kilmarnock	Free
15 January 2008	Danny Griffin	Dundee	Ross County	Free
15 January 2008	Steven Thomson	Falkirk	Brighton & Hove Albion	Undisclosed
16 January 2008	David Murphy	Hibernian	Birmingham City	£1,500,000
16 January 2008	Chris Clark	Aberdeen	Plymouth Argyle	£200,000
17 January 2008	John Rankin	Inverness Caledonian Thistle	Hibernian	£110,000
18 January 2008	Stuart Duff	Dundee United	Aberdeen	Free
18 January 2008	Ian Murray	Norwich City	Hibernian	Free
18 January 2008	Mihael Kovacevic	Koper	Dundee United	£40,000
18 January 2008	Ugo Ehiogu	Rangers	Sheffield United	Free
19 January 2008	William Kinniburgh	Motherwell	Partick Thistle	Free
19 January 2008	Michael Paton	Aberdeen	Brechin City	Loan
25 January 2008	Mark de Vries	Leicester City	Dundee United	Free
29 January 2008	Georgios Samaras	Manchester City	Celtic	Loan
29 January 2008	Koki Mizuno	JEF United Ichihara Chiba	Celtic	Undisclosed
29 January 2008	Josh Walker	Middlesbrough	Aberdeen	Loan
30 January 2008	Pat Clarke	Cowdenbeath	Clyde	Undisclosed
30 January 2008	Alan Hutton	Rangers	Tottenham Hotspur	£9,000,000
30 January 2008	Neil Alexander	Ipswich Town	Rangers	Undisclosed
30 January 2008	Christian Dailly	West Ham United	Rangers	Free
31 January 2008	Barry Robson	Dundee United	Celtic	£1,250,000
31 January 2008	Ben Hutchinson	Middlesbrough	Celtic	Undisclosed
31 January 2008	Jiří Jarošík	Celtic	Krylia Sovetov	£747,500
31 January 2008	Jimmy Gibson	Partick Thistle	Clyde	Free
31 January 2008	Billy Gibson	St Patrick's Athletic	Clyde	Free
31 January 2008	Shaun Fagan	Galway United	Clyde	Free
31 January 2008	Dougie Imrie	Clyde	Inverness Caledonian Thistle	Undisclosed
31 January 2008	Steven Davis	Fulham	Rangers	Loan
31 January 2008	Roy Carroll	Rangers	Derby County	Free
31 January 2008	Colin Nish	Kilmarnock	Hibernian	£100,000
31 January 2008	James O'Brien	Celtic	Dundee United	Loan
31 January 2008	Steven Hammell	Southend United	Motherwell	£110,000
31 January 2008	Jim Paterson	Motherwell	Plymouth Argyle	£250,000
31 January 2008	Simon Lappin	Norwich City	Motherwell	Loan
31 January 2008	Alan Maybury	Leicester City	Aberdeen	Loan
31 January 2008	Michael Hart	Aberdeen	Preston North End	Undisclosed
1 February 2008	Maciej Żurawski	Celtic	AEL	£500,000
8 February 2008	Luke Daniels	West Bromwich Albion	Motherwell	Loan
8 February 2008	Grzegorz Szamotulski	Dundee United	Preston North End	Free
16 February 2008	Martin Canning	Gretna	Hibernian	Free
26 February 2008	Robert Malcolm	Derby County	Motherwell	Undisclosed
15 April 2008	Kevin Smith	Aldershot	Dundee United	Free
29 April 2008	Stuart McCaffrey	Inverness Caledonian Thistle	St Johnstone	Free
20 May 2008	Mark Gilhaney	Hamilton Academical	Dundee	Undisclosed
