= 2007–08 Clyde F.C. season =

Clyde Football Club
2007–08 season
- Chairman: Ian Letham
- Manager: John Brown
- First Division: 9th (Playoffs)
- Scottish Cup: Fourth Round
- League Cup: First Round
- Challenge Cup: Second Round
- Top goalscorer: League: Ruari Doherty (9); All: Ruari Doherty (9)
- Highest home attendance: 2,548 (vs Airdrie United, 10 May 2008)
- Lowest home attendance: 621 (vs Queen of the South, 14 August 2007, League Cup)
Home colours	Away colours	Third colours

Season 2007–08 was Clyde's eighth consecutive season in the Scottish First Division. Former Scotland captain Colin Hendry was appointed manager in June 2007, replacing Joe Miller. Hendry resigned in January 2008, and was replaced by John Brown. The club finished 9th in the division by 1 goal, and were confined to the playoffs. They staged an impressive 6–5 aggregate victory over Alloa Athletic in the Semi Final, coming from 5–2 down with 25 minutes left. They defeated Airdrie United 3–0 over two legs to regain their status as a First Division team.

== Events ==
May

- 24 – Manager Joe Miller leaves the club.
- 26 – Forwards Andy Ferguson, Roddy Hunter & Alex Williams are released.

June

- 8 – Head of Youth Development Alan Upton leaves the club to join East Stirlingshire.
- 11 – Former Scotland captain Colin Hendry is appointed as manager. Teenage midfielder Ruari MacLennan signs a new 3-year contract.
- 30 – Former manager Graham Roberts wins his case for unfair dismissal.

July

- 18 – Defender Robert Harris joins Queen of the South after spending 3 years at Broadwood Stadium.
- 20 – Midfielder Brian Gilmour joins Harris at Queens after rejecting a new contract offer.
- 27 – Youth team graduates Kevin Bradley & David McGowan sign new contracts. Former Clyde favourite Gary Bollan is appointed Head of Youth Development.

August

- 2 – Colin Hendry makes his first signings. English midfielder Christian Smith, ex-Airdrie United defender Craig Potter, former Celtic youth Andrew Traub and goalkeeper David Thomson all join the club. Striker Gary Arbuckle signs a new contract.
- 4 – Clyde lose their opening game of the season to Greenock Morton 3–2. Clyde have a last minute equaliser controversially disallowed.
- 6 – Marvyn Wilson signs for the club after appearing as a trialist against Morton
- 7 – Clyde crash out of the League Cup in embarrassing fashion, losing to lower-league Raith Rovers 3 goals to nil.
- 15 – Clyde win their first game of the season, defeating Queen of the South 1–0 in the Challenge Cup.Michael Doherty becomes the youngest player ever to play for Clyde in a competitive match.
- 18 – Partick Thistle issue Clyde with some payback for last season with their 4–0 victory in the Glasgow Derby
- 25 – Clyde record their first league victory of the campaign over St Johnstone
- 30 – English duo Joe Cardle and Dan Kirkup join on loan from Port Vale and Carlisle United until Christmas

== Transfers ==
=== Summer ===
==== In ====
Player	From	Fee
(Scotland) Craig Potter	Airdrie United	Free
(England) Christian Smith	Port Vale	Free
(Scotland) Andrew Traub	Celtic	Free
(Scotland) Marvyn Wilson	Hamilton Academical	Free
(Scotland) Michael Doherty	Clyde Youth	Free
(Scotland) Jordan Murch	Clyde Youth	Free
(Scotland) Roddy MacLennan	Clyde Youth	Free
(Scotland) Stephen Connolly	Hamilton Academical Youth	Free
(Scotland) Ryan Craig	Greenock Morton Youth	Free
(Scotland) Martin McGowan	Greenock Morton Youth	Free
(Scotland) Callum McGregor	St Mirren Youth	Free
(Scotland) Juan Carrio	Motherwell Youth	Free
(England) Joe Cardle	Port Vale	Loan
(England) Dan Kirkup	Carlisle United	Loan
(Slovakia) Dušan Bestvina	FC Mistelbach	Free
(Nigeria) Evangelino Valentim	Unattached	Free
(Scotland) Ryan Wilkie	Unattached	Free

==== Out ====
Player	To	Fee
(Scotland) Joe Miller	Retired	Free
(Scotland) Craig Bryson	Kilmarnock	Undisclosed
(Scotland) Andy Ferguson	Alloa Athletic	Free
(Scotland) Roddy Hunter	Albion Rovers	Free
(Scotland) Alex Williams	Ayr United	Free
(Scotland) Robert Harris	Queen of the South	Undisclosed
(Scotland) Brian Gilmour	Queen of the South	Undisclosed
(Scotland) Michael Fulton	Lugar Boswell Thistle	Free
(Scotland) Paul Reynolds	Airdrie United	Free
(Scotland) Ryan McCann	Bohemians	Free
(Scotland) Andrew Traub	Cowdenbeath	Free
(Scotland) Craig Potter	Dumbarton	Free
(Scotland) David Thomson	Sauchie	Free

=== January ===
In:

Player	From	Fee
(Scotland) Pat Clarke	Cowdenbeath	Undisclosed
(Scotland) Jimmy Gibson	Partick Thistle	Free
(Scotland) Billy Gibson	St Patrick's Athletic	Free
(Scotland) Shaun Fagan	Galway United	Free
(Scotland) Iain Campbell	Kilmarnock	Loan
(Scotland) Dave McKay	Drumchapel United	Free
(Scotland) Paul MacDonald	Hearts	Free
(Germany) Jörg Albertz	Unattached	Free
(Scotland) Gary McSwegan	Unattached	Free
(Scotland) Marc McCusker	Hearts	Loan

Out:

Player	To	Fee
(England) Dan Kirkup	Carlisle United	Loan Return
(England) Joe Cardle	Port Vale	Loan Return
(Scotland) Ryan Wilkie	Workington	Free
(Nigeria) Evangelino Valentim	Released	Free
(Scotland) Dougie Imrie	Inverness Caledonian Thistle	£35,000

== Squad ==
Note: Flags indicate national team as defined under FIFA eligibility rules; some limited exceptions apply. Players may hold more than one non-FIFA nationality.

No.	Pos.	Nation	Player
—	GK	SCO	Peter Cherrie
—	GK	SCO	David Hutton
—	GK	SCO	David Thomson
—	DF	SVK	Dušan Bestvina
—	DF	SCO	Iain Campbell (On loan from Kilmarnock)
—	DF	SCO	Michael Doherty
—	DF	SCO	Billy Gibson
—	DF	SCO	Chris Higgins (Vice captain)
—	DF	ENG	Dan Kirkup (On loan from Carlisle United)
—	DF	SCO	Paul MacDonald
—	DF	SCO	Callum McGregor
—	DF	SCO	Neil McGregor (Club captain)
—	DF	NIR	Michael McGowan
—	DF	SCO	Craig McKeown (Team captain)
—	DF	SCO	Craig Potter
—	DF	SCO	Andrew Traub
—	MF	GER	Jörg Albertz
—	MF	SCO	Kevin Bradley
—	MF	ENG	Joe Cardle (On loan from Port Vale)
—	MF	SCO	Juan Carrio
—	MF	SCO	Stephen Connolly

No.	Pos.	Nation	Player
—	MF	SCO	Shaun Fagan
—	MF	SCO	Jimmy Gibson
—	MF	SCO	Steven Masterton
—	MF	SCO	Ruari MacLennan
—	MF	SCO	David McGowan
—	MF	SCO	Martin McGowan
—	MF	SCO	Jordan Murch
—	MF	ENG	Christian Smith
—	MF	SCO	Ryan Wilkie
—	MF	SCO	Marvyn Wilson
—	FW	SCO	Gary Arbuckle
—	FW	SCO	Pat Clarke
—	FW	SCO	Ryan Craig
—	FW	SCO	Kyle Hendry
—	FW	SCO	Dougie Imrie
—	FW	SCO	Roddy MacLennan
—	FW	SCO	Marc McCusker (On loan from Hearts)
—	FW	SCO	Dave McKay
—	FW	SCO	Sean McKenna
—	FW	SCO	Gary McSwegan
—	FW	NGA	Evangelino Valentim

== Fixtures and results ==
=== Pre-season ===
Date	Opponents	Stadium	Result F – A	Scorers
10 July 2007	East Stirlingshire	Little Kerse	2 – 3	Masterton, Trialist
13 July 2007	Stenhousemuir	Ochilview Park	3 – 2	Imrie, Bradley (pen.)
24 July 2007	St Mirren	Love Street	1 – 2	Imrie
26 July 2007	Oldham Athletic	Broadwood Stadium	2 – 2	(own goal), Arbuckle

=== Scottish First Division ===
Date	Opponents	Stadium	Result F – A	Scorers	Attendance	Position	Notes
4 August 2007	Greenock Morton	Cappielow	2 – 3	Masterton 10', Higgins 45'	3,784	8th
11 August 2007	Hamilton Academical	Broadwood Stadium	0 – 2	N. McGregor (red card) 45'	1,182	8th
18 August 2007	Partick Thistle	Firhill Stadium	0 – 4		3,175	10th
25 August 2007	St Johnstone	Broadwood Stadium	1 – 0	Ruari MacLennan 70'	1,310	9th
1 September 2007	Dundee	Broadwood Stadium	1 – 2	Higgins 4', Cardle (red card) 25'	1,500	9th
15 September 2007	Queen of the South	Palmerston Park	1 – 1	N. McGregor 49'	1,730	10th
22 September 2007	Dunfermline Athletic	Broadwood Stadium	2 – 1	Masterton 19', D. McGowan 65'	1,554	7th
29 September 2007	Livingston	Almondvale Stadium	2 – 4	D. McGowan 15', Ruari MacLennan (red card) 42', Imrie 85' (pen.), Smith (red card) 88'	1,500	9th
6 October 2007	Stirling Albion	Forthbank Stadium	2 – 0	Arbuckle 38', N. McGregor 45'	950	7th
20 October 2007	Greenock Morton	Broadwood Stadium	0 – 1		1,231	7th
27 October 2007	St Johnstone	McDiarmid Park	1 – 1	Imrie 75'	2,782	7th
3 November 2007	Partick Thistle	Broadwood Stadium	1 – 2	Imrie 88' (pen.)	1,980	10th
11 November 2007	Dundee	Dens Park	1 – 0	Dixon 86' (own goal)	3,727	7th
1 December 2007	Queen of the South	Broadwood Stadium	0 – 0		1,008	7th
8 December 2007	Dunfermline Athletic	East End Park	1 – 1	D. McGowan 3', Imrie (red card) 57'	3,574	7th
15 December 2007	Livingston	Broadwood Stadium	2 – 1	McKeown 43', N. McGregor 75'	910	7th
26 December 2007	Hamilton Academical	New Douglas Park	0 – 0		1,750	9th
29 December 2007	St Johnstone	Broadwood Stadium	1 – 3	Bradley 14', Wilson (red card) 59'	1,200	9th
2 January 2008	Partick Thistle	Firhill Stadium	1 – 1	Arbuckle 26'	3,299	8th
5 January 2008	Queen of the South	Palmerston Park	1 – 3	Michael McGowan 15' (pen.)	1,513	9th
19 January 2008	Dundee	Broadwood Stadium	1 – 1	Arbuckle 72'	1,328	9th
26 January 2008	Hamilton Academical	Broadwood Stadium	2 – 3	Arbuckle 3', Imrie 14'	1,214	9th
2 February 2008	Stirling Albion	Broadwood Stadium	1 – 3	Fagan 79' (pen.)	961	9th
9 February 2008	Greenock Morton	Cappielow	2 – 1	Ruari MacLennan 90+1', McKeown 90+3'	2,239	8th
23 February 2008	Dunfermline Athletic	Broadwood Stadium	1 – 2	Clarke 68' (pen.)	1,126	8th
1 March 2008	Partick Thistle	Broadwood Stadium	1 – 4	McKeown 10'	1,717	9th
8 March 2008	Livingston	Almondvale Stadium	0 – 0		1,800	9th
11 March 2008	Greenock Morton	Broadwood Stadium	1 – 1	Clarke 56'	1,265	9th
15 March 2008	Stirling Albion	Forthbank Stadium	1 – 1	Albertz 45', Campbell (red card) 65'	1,089	9th
22 March 2008	Queen of the South	Broadwood Stadium	1 – 4	Masterton 69'	1,211	9th
25 March 2008	St Johnstone	McDiarmid Park	2 – 1	Bradley 30', Albertz 51'	1,686	7th
29 March 2008	Dundee	Dens Park	0 – 2		4,037	8th
5 April 2008	Livingston	Broadwood Stadium	3 – 2	Clarke 19', Ruari MacLennan 24' 48'	1,156	8th
12 April 2008	Dunfermline Athletic	East End Park	1 – 2	Clarke 44'	3,129	8th
19 April 2008	Hamilton Academical	New Douglas Park	0 – 2	N. McGregor (red card) 21'	4,940	9th
26 April 2008	Stirling Albion	Broadwood Stadium	3 – 0	McSwegan 44', Clarke 46' 83' (pen.)	1,426	9th

=== Playoffs ===
Date	Stage	Opponents	Stadium	Result F – A	Scorers	Attendance	Notes
30 April 2008	Semi Final First Leg	Alloa Athletic	Recreation Park	1 – 2	Masterton 62'	1,026
3 May 2008	Semi Final Second Leg	Alloa Athletic	Broadwood Stadium	5 – 3 AET	J. Gibson 30', Arbuckle 64', B. Gibson 68', McSwegan 84', Clarke 111'	1,548
7 May 2008	Final First Leg	Airdrie United	Excelsior Stadium	1 – 0	Clarke 77'	1,878
10 May 2008	Final Second Leg	Airdrie United	Broadwood Stadium	2 – 0	McSwegan 47', Clarke 64'	2,548

=== Scottish League Cup ===
Date	Round	Opponents	Stadium	Result F – A	Scorers	Attendance	Notes
7 August 2007	Round 1	Raith Rovers	Broadwood Stadium	0 – 3		892

=== Scottish Challenge Cup ===
Date	Round	Opponents	Stadium	Result F – A	Scorers	Attendance	Notes
14 August 2007	Round 1	Queen of the South	Broadwood Stadium	1 – 0	Masterton 13'	621
5 September 2007	Round 2	Dunfermline Athletic	Broadwood Stadium	1 – 4	Ruari MacLennan 46'	799

=== Scottish Cup ===
Date	Round	Opponents	Stadium	Result F – A	Scorers	Attendance	Notes
24 November 2007	Round 3	Montrose	Broadwood Stadium	2 – 0	Arbuckle 8', Imrie 90'	821
16 January 2008	Round 4	Dundee United	Broadwood Stadium	0 – 1		1,550

=== Reserve League Cup ===
Date	Stage	Opponents	Stadium	Result F – A	Scorers
16 October 2007	Group	Airdrie United	Broadwood Stadium	1 – 0	Valentim
29 October 2007	Group	Stranraer	Stair Park	6 – 0	Valentim, McKeown, Smith, Bradley
15 November 2007	Group	East Stirlingshire	Firs Park	4 – 1	Valentim, Bradley, McKenna
22 January 2008	Group	Stenhousemuir	Ochilview Park	3 – 2	Roddy MacLennan, McKenna, Connolly
12 February 2008	Group	Hamilton Academical	Broadwood Stadium	2 – 1	McKay (Trialist), Smith (red card)
4 March 2008	Group	Queens Park	Broadwood Stadium	1 – 1	McKay
12 March 2008	Group	Partick Thistle	Firhill Stadium	3 – 5	Roddy MacLennan, McKay
27 April 2007	Semi Final	St Johnstone	McDiarmid Park	2 – 0	McKenna, McLaren (Trialist)
5 May 2008	Final	Livingston	Almondvale Stadium	4 – 1	McKay, C. McGregor (red card)

== Player statistics ==
=== Overall ===
Clyde used 33 players during the 2007–08 season, and another 3 were unused substitutes. David Hutton was the only ever-present, starting all 45 competitive matches.

#	Player	P	Goal	Booked	Sent off (straight red)
GK	(Scotland) David Hutton	45	0	2	0
DF	(Scotland) Neil McGregor	40	3	10	2
DF	(Scotland) Chris Higgins	41	2	11	0
MF	(England) Christian Smith	25 (6)	0	8	1
MF	(Scotland) Steven Masterton	28 (6)	5	4	0
MF	(Scotland) Kevin Bradley	23 (12)	2	3	0
MF	(Scotland) Marvyn Wilson	19 (5)	0	12	1
FW	(Scotland) Gary Arbuckle	23 (12)	6	1	0
DF	(Northern Ireland) Michael McGowan	34 (6)	1	5	0
MF	(Scotland) Ruari MacLennan	37 (5)	5	4	1
MF	(Scotland) David McGowan	22 (12)	3	3	0
FW	(Scotland) Sean McKenna	1 (9)	0	1	0
DF	(Scotland) Michael Doherty	0 (2)	0	0	0
MF	(Scotland) Stephen Connolly	0 (1)	0	0	0
DF	(Slovakia) Dušan Bestvina	24 (1)	0	5	0
DF	(Scotland) Craig McKeown	18 (1)	3	4	0
FW	(Scotland) Roddy MacLennan	2 (5)	0	0	0
DF	(Scotland) Iain Campbell	4	0	1	1
DF	(Scotland) Billy Gibson	18	1	2	0
FW	(Scotland) Pat Clarke	15	9	3	0
MF	(Scotland) Shaun Fagan	2 (1)	1	2	0
FW	(Scotland) Dave McKay	8 (8)	0	1	0
MF	(Scotland) Jimmy Gibson	5 (5)	1	2	0
FW	(Scotland) Gary McSwegan	6 (3)	3	1	0
MF	(Germany) Jörg Albertz	7 (1)	2	1	0
FW	(Scotland) Marc McCusker	0 (3)	0	0	0
GK	(Scotland) Peter Cherrie	0	0	0	0
MF	(Scotland) Juan Carrio	0	0	0	0
DF	(Scotland) Callum McGregor	0	0	0	0
FW	(Scotland) Dougie Imrie	24	5	12	1
FW	(Nigeria) Evangelino Valentim	0 (3)	0	0	0
DF	(England) Dan Kirkup	7 (1)	0	0	0
MF	(England) Joe Cardle	10	0	3	1
DF	(Scotland) Craig Potter	6	0	0	0
DF	(Scotland) Andrew Traub	1	0	0	0
GK	(Scotland) David Thomson	0 (1)	0	0	0
MF	(Scotland) Ryan Wilkie	0	0	0	0

=== League ===
#	Player	P	Goal	Booked	Sent off (straight red)
GK	(Scotland) David Hutton	40	0	2	0
DF	(Scotland) Neil McGregor	35	3	10	2
DF	(Scotland) Chris Higgins	36	2	8	0
MF	(England) Christian Smith	20 (6)	0	7	1
MF	(Scotland) Steven Masterton	24 (6)	4	3	0
MF	(Scotland) Kevin Bradley	20 (11)	2	1	0
MF	(Scotland) Marvyn Wilson	18 (4)	0	11	1
FW	(Scotland) Gary Arbuckle	19 (12)	5	1	0
DF	(Northern Ireland) Michael McGowan	30 (6)	1	5	0
MF	(Scotland) Ruari MacLennan	33 (4)	4	4	1
MF	(Scotland) David McGowan	20 (9)	3	3	0
FW	(Scotland) Sean McKenna	1 (8)	0	1	0
MF	(Scotland) Stephen Connolly	0 (1)	0	0	0
DF	(Scotland) Michael Doherty	0 (1)	0	0	0
DF	(Slovakia) Dušan Bestvina	24 (1)	0	5	0
DF	(Scotland) Craig McKeown	16 (1)	3	4	0
FW	(Scotland) Roddy MacLennan	1 (5)	0	0	0
DF	(Scotland) Iain Campbell	4	0	1	1
DF	(Scotland) Billy Gibson	18	1	2	0
FW	(Scotland) Pat Clarke	15	9	3	0
MF	(Scotland) Shaun Fagan	2 (1)	1	2	0
FW	(Scotland) Dave McKay	8 (8)	0	1	0
MF	(Scotland) Jimmy Gibson	5 (5)	1	2	0
FW	(Scotland) Gary McSwegan	6 (3)	3	1	0
MF	(Germany) Jörg Albertz	7 (1)	2	1	0
FW	(Scotland) Marc McCusker	0 (3)	0	0	0
FW	(Scotland) Dougie Imrie	19	4	11	1
FW	(Nigeria) Evangelino Valentim	0 (2)	0	0	0
DF	(England) Dan Kirkup	6 (1)	0	0	0
MF	(England) Joe Cardle	8	0	3	1
DF	(Scotland) Craig Potter	4	0	0	0
DF	(Scotland) Andrew Traub	1	0	0	0
GK	(Scotland) David Thomson	0 (1)	0	0	0

=== Challenge Cup ===
#	Player	P	Goal	Booked	Sent off (straight red)
GK	(Scotland) David Hutton	2	0	0	0
DF	(Scotland) Neil McGregor	2	0	0	0
DF	(Scotland) Chris Higgins	2	0	1	0
MF	(England) Christian Smith	2	0	0	0
MF	(Scotland) Steven Masterton	2	1	0	0
MF	(Scotland) Ruari MacLennan	2	1	0	0
FW	(Scotland) Dougie Imrie	2	0	1	0
DF	(Scotland) David McGowan	2	0	0	0
MF	(Scotland) Kevin Bradley	1 (1)	0	0	0
DF	(Scotland) Craig Potter	1	0	0	0
FW	(Scotland) Gary Arbuckle	1	0	0	0
DF	(England) Dan Kirkup	1	0	0	0
MF	(England) Joe Cardle	1	0	0	0
DF	(Northern Ireland) Michael McGowan	1	0	0	0
DF	(Scotland) Michael Doherty	0 (1)	0	0	0
MF	(Scotland) Marvyn Wilson	0 (1)	0	0	0
FW	(Scotland) Sean McKenna	0 (1)	0	0	0

=== League Cup ===
#	Player	P	Goal	Booked	Sent off (straight red)
GK	(Scotland) David Hutton	1	0	0	0
DF	(Scotland) Neil McGregor	1	0	0	0
DF	(Scotland) Craig Potter	1	0	0	0
DF	(Scotland) Chris Higgins	1	0	1	0
MF	(England) Christian Smith	1	0	0	0
MF	(Scotland) Steven Masterton	1	0	1	0
MF	(Scotland) Kevin Bradley	1	0	1	0
MF	(Scotland) Marvyn Wilson	1	0	1	0
FW	(Scotland) Gary Arbuckle	1	0	0	0
FW	(Scotland) Dougie Imrie	1	0	0	0
DF	(Northern Ireland) Michael McGowan	1	0	0	0
MF	(Scotland) Ruari MacLennan	0 (1)	0	0	0
MF	(Scotland) David McGowan	0 (1)	0	0	0

=== Scottish Cup ===
#	Player	P	Goal	Booked	Sent off (straight red)
GK	(Scotland) David Hutton	2	0	0	0
DF	(Scotland) Neil McGregor	2	0	0	0
MF	(England) Christian Smith	2	0	1	0
DF	(Scotland) Chris Higgins	2	0	1	0
DF	(Scotland) Craig McKeown	2	0	0	0
MF	(Scotland) Ruari MacLennan	2	0	0	0
FW	(Scotland) Gary Arbuckle	2	1	0	0
FW	(Scotland) Dougie Imrie	2	1	0	0
DF	(Northern Ireland) Michael McGowan	2	0	0	0
FW	(Scotland) Roddy MacLennan	1	0	0	0
MF	(England) Joe Cardle	1	0	0	0
MF	(Scotland) Steven Masterton	1	0	0	0
MF	(Scotland) Kevin Bradley	1	0	0	0
MF	(Scotland) David McGowan	0 (2)	0	0	0
FW	(Nigeria) Evangelino Valentim	0 (1)	0	0	0

Note: Players in italics left the club before or during the January transfer window.

== League table ==
Pos	Team	Pld	W	D	L	GF	GA	GD	Pts	Promotion, qualification or relegation
6	Partick Thistle	36	11	12	13	40	39	+1	45	
7	Livingston	36	10	9	17	55	66	−11	39	
8	Greenock Morton	36	9	10	17	40	58	−18	37	
9	Clyde	36	9	10	17	40	59	−19	37	Qualification for the First Division Play-offs (Note: The 9th placed team were entered into a play-off with the Second Division's 2nd, 3rd and 4th placed teams. The winning team were awarded a place in the 2008–09 First Division, Clyde won the play-off to stay in the division.)
10	Stirling Albion (R)	36	4	12	20	41	71	−30	24	Relegation to the Second Division

Source: BBC Sport
Rules for classification: 1) points; 2) goal difference; 3) number of goals scored.
(R) Relegated
