= Bestvina =

Bestvina may refer to:

- Běstvina, a municipality and village in the Czech Republic
- Dušan Bestvina (born 1981), Slovak footballer
- Mladen Bestvina (born 1959), Croatian American mathematician
