= 2007–08 Scottish First Division =

Irn-Bru Scottish First Division
- Season: 2007–08
- Champions: Hamilton Academical
- Promoted: Hamilton Academical
- Relegated: Stirling Albion
- UEFA Cup: Queen of the South
- Top goalscorer: Richard Offiong (19)
- Biggest home win: Livingston 6–1 Greenock Morton
- Biggest away win: Stirling Albion 1–6 Dundee

The 2007–08 First Division season was the 14th season of the First Division in its current format of ten teams.

The team which finished first were automatically promoted to the Scottish Premier League. The team which finished bottom were automatically relegated to the Second Division and the team which finished second bottom were entered into the First division play-offs with the teams which finished second, third and fourth in the Third Division for a place in the 2008–09 First Division.

== Promotion and Relegation from 2006–07 ==
=== SPL and First Division ===
Relegated from Premier League to First Division

- Dunfermline Athletic

Promoted from First Division to Premier League

- Gretna

=== First and Second Divisions ===
Relegated from First Division to Second Division

- Ross County
- Airdrie United (via play-offs)

Promoted from Second Division to First Division

- Greenock Morton
- Stirling Albion (via play-offs)

== Events ==
- 29 March: Gretna are relegated from the SPL to the First Division after losing 2–0 to St Mirren.
- 5 April: Ross County win promotion to the First Division as Second Division champions after defeating Berwick Rangers 4–0 and second place Airdrie United losing 2–1 to Brechin City.
- 8 April: Stirling Albion are relegated from the First Division after a 1–0 defeat to Partick Thistle.
- 19 April: Hamilton Academical win promotion to the Scottish Premier League as First Division champions following a 2–0 over Clyde.
- 10 May: Clyde retain their First Division status after defeating Airdrie United 3–0 on aggregate in the First Division play-off final.
- 29 May: Play-off runners-up Airdrie United are promoted to the First Division following Gretna's demotion to the Third Division.

== League table ==
Pos	Team	Pld	W	D	L	GF	GA	GD	Pts	Promotion, qualification or relegation
1	Hamilton Academical (C, P)	36	23	7	6	62	27	+35	76	Promotion to the Premier League
2	Dundee	36	20	9	7	58	30	+28	69	
3	St Johnstone	36	15	13	8	60	45	+15	58	
4	Queen of the South	36	14	10	12	47	43	+4	52	Qualification for the UEFA Cup second qualifying round (Note: Queen of the South qualified for the UEFA Cup Second Qualifying Round as Scottish Cup runners-up)
5	Dunfermline Athletic	36	13	12	11	36	41	−5	51	
6	Partick Thistle	36	11	12	13	40	39	+1	45	
7	Livingston	36	10	9	17	55	66	−11	39	
8	Greenock Morton	36	9	10	17	40	58	−18	37	
9	Clyde	36	9	10	17	40	59	−19	37	Qualification for the First Division Play-offs (Note: The 9th placed team were entered into a play-off with the Second Division's 2nd, 3rd and 4th placed teams. The winning team were awarded a place in the 2008–09 First Division, Clyde won the play-off to stay in the division.)
10	Stirling Albion (R)	36	4	12	20	41	71	−30	24	Relegation to the Second Division

Source: BBC Sport
Rules for classification: 1) points; 2) goal difference; 3) number of goals scored.
(C) Champions; (P) Promoted; (R) Relegated

== Results ==
Teams play each other four times in this league. In the first half of the season each team plays every other team twice (home and away) and then do the same in the second half of the season.

=== First half of season ===
Home \ Away	CLY	DND	DNF	GMO	HAM	LIV	PAR	QOS	STJ	STI
Clyde		1–2	2–1	0–1	0–2	2–1	1–2	0–0	1–0	1–3
Dundee	0–1		1–1	2–1	1–0	4–1	3–0	2–1	2–1	3–1
Dunfermline Athletic	1–1	0–1		0–1	0–5	0–4	1–0	2–0	0–0	2–1
Greenock Morton	3–2	0–2	0–1		0–2	2–2	4–2	0–1	2–2	1–1
Hamilton Academical	0–0	2–0	2–1	1–0		1–1	2–0	1–0	1–0	4–0
Livingston	4–2	0–2	1–1	4–0	2–0		0–4	2–2	0–2	4–3
Partick Thistle	4–0	1–1	1–1	1–1	0–3	3–0		2–0	2–2	1–1
Queen of the South	1–1	2–1	0–1	1–3	2–1	1–0	1–2		3–3	2–2
St Johnstone	1–1	1–1	0–0	2–2	4–1	5–2	2–1	2–0		2–2
Stirling Albion	0–2	2–2	3–0	0–0	2–4	3–3	1–1	1–3	0–0	

Source: BBC Sport
Legend: Blue = home team win; Yellow = draw; Red = away team win.

=== Second half of season ===
Home \ Away	CLY	DND	DNF	GMO	HAM	LIV	PAR	QOS	STJ	STI
Clyde		1–1	1–2	1–1	2–3	3–2	1–4	1–4	1–3	1–3
Dundee	2–0		0–0	2–0	1–1	2–0	1–0	2–3	3–2	3–0
Dunfermline Athletic	2–1	0–1		2–0	1–1	1–1	1–1	4–0	0–1	2–1
Greenock Morton	1–2	1–2	3–0		1–3	1–1	0–0	0–3	1–2	2–1
Hamilton Academical	2–0	1–0	3–0	3–0		3–1	0–0	1–0	2–0	0–0
Livingston	0–0	1–1	0–2	6–1	1–3		1–0	1–0	0–2	2–1
Partick Thistle	1–1	1–0	0–1	0–3	3–0	2–1		0–0	0–0	1–0
Queen of the South	3–1	1–0	1–1	0–0	2–2	1–0	2–0		3–1	3–1
St Johnstone	1–2	1–1	1–1	3–2	2–1	5–2	2–0	2–1		2–1
Stirling Albion	1–1	1–6	2–3	1–2	0–1	1–4	1–0	0–0	3–1	

Source: BBC Sport
Legend: Blue = home team win; Yellow = draw; Red = away team win.

== Top scorers ==
Scorer	Goals	Team
(England) Richard Offiong	19	Hamilton Academical
(Scotland) Stephen Dobbie	16	Queen of the South
(Republic of Ireland) Andy Jackson	14	St Johnstone
(Scotland) Chris Aitken	13	Stirling Albion
(Scotland) Graham Dorrans	11	Livingston
(Scotland) Liam Buchanan	11	Partick Thistle
(Scotland) Mark Burchill	11	Dunfermline Athletic
(Scotland) Kevin McDonald	9	Dundee
(Scotland) Robert Snodgrass	9	Livingston
(Scotland) Paul Sheerin	9	St Johnstone
(France) Mickaël Antoine-Curier	9	Dundee
(England) Peter Weatherson	9	Greenock Morton
(England) Sean O'Connor	8	Queen of the South
(Scotland) Colin McMenamin	8	Dundee
(Scotland) Iain Russell	8	Greenock Morton
(Scotland) Robert Davidson	8	Dundee

Source: The League Insider

== Attendances ==
Team	Stadium	Capacity	Highest	Lowest	Average
Dundee	Dens Park	11,856	6,192	3,146	4,264
Dunfermline Athletic	East End Park	11,998	4,946	2,444	3,754
St Johnstone	McDiarmid Park	10,673	6,279	1,686	2,969
Greenock Morton	Cappielow	5,741	3,818	2,228	2,727
Partick Thistle	Firhill Stadium	10,887	4,914	1,149	2,591
Hamilton Academical	New Douglas Park	5,396	5,078	1,410	2,468
Queen of the South	Palmerston Park	6,412	3,005	1,484	1,965
Livingston	Almondvale Stadium	10,016	2,865	1,125	1,726
Clyde	Broadwood Stadium	8,006	1,979	910	1,298
Stirling Albion	Forthbank Stadium	3,808	2,215	431	1,166

Source: The League Insider

== Managerial changes ==
Team	Outgoing manager	Manner of departure	Date of vacancy	Replaced by	Date of appointment
Clyde	(Scotland) Joe Miller	Mutual consent	25 May	(Scotland) Colin Hendry	11 June
St Johnstone	(Scotland) Owen Coyle	Mutual consent	22 November	(Scotland) Derek McInnes	27 November
Dunfermline Athletic	(Republic of Ireland) Stephen Kenny	Sacked	4 December	(Scotland) Jim McIntyre	3 January
Clyde	(Scotland) Colin Hendry	Resigned	18 January	(Scotland) John Brown	26 January
Greenock Morton	(Scotland) Jim McInally	Resigned	12 February	(Scotland) David Irons	19 February
Livingston	(England) Mark Proctor	Sacked	3 June	(Italy) Roberto Landi	11 June

== Monthly awards ==
Month	First Division manager	SFL Player	SFL Young player
August	(Scotland) Billy Reid (Hamilton Academical)	(England) Richard Offiong (Hamilton Academical)	(Scotland) Kevin McDonald (Dundee)
September	(Scotland) Owen Coyle (St Johnstone)	Second Division player	(Scotland) James McArthur (Hamilton Academical)
October	(Scotland) Billy Reid (Hamilton Academical)	(England) Bryn Halliwell (Hamilton Academical)	(Republic of Ireland) James McCarthy (Hamilton Academical)
November	(Scotland) Alex Rae (Dundee)	(Scotland) Kenny Deuchar (St Johnstone)	Third Division player
December	(Scotland) Jim McIntyre (Dunfermline Athletic)	Second Division player	(Scotland) Kevin McDonald (Dundee)
January	(Scotland) Gordon Chisholm (Queen of the South)	Second Division player	(Republic of Ireland) Andy Jackson (St Johnstone)
February	(Scotland) Gordon Chisholm (Queen of the South)	(France) Mickaël Antoine-Curier (Dundee)	(Scotland) Graham Dorrans (Livingston)
March	(Scotland) Ian McCall (Partick Thistle)	(Northern Ireland) Jonathan Tuffey (Partick Thistle)	(Scotland) Leigh Griffiths (Livingston)
April	(Scotland) Gordon Chisholm (Queen of the South)	(Scotland) Mark McLaughlin (Hamilton Academical)	(Scotland) Brian Easton (Hamilton Academical)

== First Division play-offs ==
=== Semi-finals ===
The ninth placed team in the First Division played the fourth placed team in the Second Division and third placed team in the Second Division played the second placed team in the Second Division. The play-offs were played over two legs, the winning team in each semi-final advanced to the final.

Team 1	Agg.	Team 2	1st leg	2nd leg
Alloa Athletic	5–6	Clyde	2–1	3–5
Raith Rovers	2–4	Airdrie United	0–2	2–2

First legs

30 April 2008
19:45

Alloa Athletic	2–1	Clyde
Scott 31'; Coakley 83'	Report	Masterton 62'

Recreation Park, Alloa
Attendance: 1,026
Referee: D Somers

30 April 2008
19:45

Raith Rovers	0–2	Airdrie United
	Report	Russell 31' 39'

Stark's Park, Kirkcaldy
Attendance: 2,841
Referee: D McDonald

Second legs

3 May 2008
15:00

Clyde	5 – 3 (a.e.t.)	Alloa Athletic
J. Gibson 30'; Arbuckle 64'; B. Gibson 68'; McSwegan 84'; Clarke 111'	Report	B. Ferguson 40'; Forrest 42'; Bestvina 46' (o.g.)

Broadwood Stadium, Cumbernauld
Attendance: 1,548
Referee: M Tumilty

3 May 2008
15:00

Airdrie United	2–2	Raith Rovers
Prunty 10'; Donnelly 77'	Report	Weir 18' 81' (pen.)

New Broomfield, Airdrie
Attendance: 2,077
Referee: C Thomson

==== Final ====
The two semi-final winners played each other over two legs, the home team in the 1st Leg was determined by a draw conducted on 1 April 2008. The winning team was awarded a place in the 2008–09 First Division.

Team 1	Agg.	Team 2	1st leg	2nd leg
Airdrie United	0–3	Clyde	0–1	0–2

First leg

7 May 2008
19:45

Airdrie United	0–1	Clyde
	Report	Clarke 77'

New Broomfield, Airdrie
Attendance: 1,878
Referee: I Brines

Second leg

10 May 2008
15:00

Clyde	2–0	Airdrie United
McSwegan 47'; Clarke 65'	Report

Broadwood Stadium, Cumbernauld
Attendance: 2,548
Referee: J Underhill

Clyde remained in First Division.

== Transfer deals ==
See: List of Scottish football transfers 2007–08
