= Kevin Bradley =

Kevin Bradley may refer to:

- Kevin Bradley (Scottish footballer) (born 1986), Scottish football midfielder
- Kevin Bradley (American football) (born c. 1961), American football coach
- Kevin Bradley (Australian footballer) (1931–2013), Australian rules footballer
