= David Hutton (footballer, born 1985) =

Scottish footballer

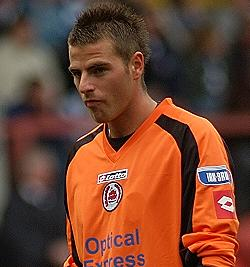

Personal information
- Full name: David William Hutton
- Date of birth: 18 May 1985 (age 41)
- Place of birth: Glasgow, Scotland
- Height: 6 ft 1 in (1.85 m)
- Position: Goalkeeper

Team information
- Current team: Airdrieonians
- Number: 43

Youth career
- 2001–2002: Aberdeen

Senior career*
Years	Team	Apps	(Gls)
2002–2004	Aberdeen	0	(0)
2004–2006	Petershill		
2006–2009	Clyde	92	(0)
2009–2011	Queen of the South	53	(0)
2011–2012	Hamilton Academical	19	(0)
2012–2013	Greenock Morton	3	(0)
2013–2015	Ayr United	72	(0)
2015–2017	Dunfermline Athletic	9	(0)
2017–2018	Arbroath	32	(0)
2018–2021	Airdrieonians	50	(0)
2021	Brechin City	11	(0)
2021–2022	Alloa Athletic	12	(0)
2022–	Airdrieonians	17	(0)
- * Club domestic league appearances and goals as of 22:52, 23 June 2022 (UTC)

David William Hutton (born 18 May 1985) is a Scottish professional footballer who plays as a goalkeeper for Scottish League One club Airdrieonians. Hutton has previously played for Aberdeen, Petershill, Clyde, Queen of the South, Hamilton Academical, Greenock Morton, Ayr United, Dunfermline Athletic, Arbroath, Brechin City and Alloa Athletic.

== Career ==
=== Aberdeen, Petershill Clyde ===
Born in Glasgow, Hutton started his career with Aberdeen, but failed to break into the first team. He was in goal for the 2003 Scottish Youth Cup final. Aberdeen lost 3–1 to Celtic. Hutton then spent a short time in the Junior League with Petershill.

Hutton signed for Clyde on 29 August 2006. He made his debut in a 1–0 Scottish Challenge Cup victory over Ayr United, and went on to establish himself as first choice goalkeeper. Hutton kept 11 clean sheets in 2006–07, and was part of the defence which boasted the best defensive record during the season. Hutton signed a new 18-month contract in January 2008. He was voted Clyde's Player of the Year for season 2007–08. Hutton was released by Clyde in June 2009 along with the rest of the out of contract players, due to the club's financial position.

=== Queen of the South & Hamilton ===
Hutton was signed by manager Gordon Chisholm for Dumfries club, Queen of the South on 29 June 2009. Hutton's sequence of four consecutive clean sheets in senior games joined the likes of Allan Ball, George Farm, Alan Davidson and David Purdie in equalling the club record.

In July 2011, Hutton moved to Hamilton Accies, but after a solitary season at the club he was released at the end of the 2011–12 season.

=== Greenock Morton ===
Hutton was listed as a substitute for Greenock Morton in their home league match on 1 September 2012, against Dumbarton, who were looking to replace Alan Combe who left Cappielow Park to join Hearts as their new goalkeeping coach. Hutton signed for the Greenock club on 11 September 2012, until the end of January 2013, where he would battle for the number one shirt with Derek Gaston. Despite only 14 minutes of action for the first team, Hutton signed a contract extension in January 2013 to keep him at the club until the end of the season. He was released by Morton at the end of the 2012–13 season.

=== Ayr United ===
Hutton signed for Ayr United in July 2013, despite a contract offer from big-spending Celtic Nation. In July 2014, Ayr United announced that Hutton had re-signed, after impressing in his first season at Somerset Park. Despite helping the side avoid relegation, Hutton was not offered a new contract and left the club in May 2015.

=== Dunfermline Athletic ===
In July 2015, Hutton signed for Scottish League One side Dunfermline Athletic after appearing in three trial matches for the side. Hutton's first season with the Pars saw him make only two competitive starts, after Sean Murdoch kept him out of the first-team. His first appearance came a week after Dunfermline won the league title, in a 1–0 win against Albion Rovers at Cliftonhill. His only other start came two weeks later in a 4–1 defeat against Stranraer.

For his second season with the side Hutton chose 43 as his squad number, which was his squad number whilst with Aberdeen. In addition to this, Hutton decided that he would have 'Sinclair–Hutton' printed on his jersey, as a tribute to his wife's father who he said had played "a big part of [his] life". After a wrist injury kept first choice keeper Murdoch out of action, Hutton started the season in goal for the Pars making appearances in both the League Cup and Championship. However, with Murdoch's return from injury in September 2016, Hutton found his first-team chances limited and at the end of the season, he was one of a number of players to be released by the club.

=== Later career ===
Hutton subsequently signed with Scottish League One club Arbroath on 21 July 2017. After one season, he was released by Arbroath in May 2018, signing for league rivals Airdrieonians shortly after. On 2 January 2021, Hutton left Airdrieonians by mutual consent and immediately signed with Scottish League Two club Brechin City on an 18-month deal.

Hutton signed for Alloa Athletic in July 2021.

== Career statistics ==
As of match played 6 November 2021

Appearances and goals by club, season and competition
Club	Season	League			Cup		League Cup		Other		Total	
Club	Season	Division	App	Goals	App	Goals	App	Goals	App	Goals	App	Goals
Aberdeen	2002–03	Scottish Premier League	0	0	0	0	0	0	0	0	0	0
Aberdeen	2003–04	Scottish Premier League	0	0	0	0	0	0	0	0	0	0
Aberdeen	Total		0	0	0	0	0	0	0	0	0	0
Clyde	2006–07	Scottish First Division	25	0	1	0	0	0	2 (Note: Appearances in the Scottish Challenge Cup)	0	28	0
Clyde	2007–08	Scottish First Division	36	0	2	0	1	0	6 (Note: Two appearances in the Scottish Challenge Cup and four appearances in the Scottish First Division play-offs)	0	45	0
Clyde	2008–09	Scottish First Division	31	0	2	0	0	0	1	0	34	0
Clyde	Total		92	0	5	0	1	0	9	0	107	0
Queen of the South	2009–10	Scottish First Division	28	0	1	0	1	0	1	0	31	0
Queen of the South	2010–11	Scottish First Division	25	0	0	0	0	0	1	0	26	0
Queen of the South	Total		53	0	1	0	1	0	2	0	57	0
Hamilton Academical	2011–12	Scottish First Division	19	0	1	0	0	0	1	0	21	0
Greenock Morton	2012–13	Scottish First Division	3	0	1	0	0	0	0	0	4	0
Ayr United	2013–14	Scottish League One	36	0	3	0	1	0	4 (Note: Two appearances in the Scottish Challenge Cup and two appearances in the Scottish Championship play-offs)	0	44	0
Ayr United	2014–15	Scottish League One	36	0	2	0	2	0	1	0	41	0
Ayr United	Total		72	0	5	0	3	0	5	0	85	0
Dunfermline Athletic	2015–16	Scottish League One	2	0	0	0	0	0	0	0	2	0
Dunfermline Athletic	2016–17	Scottish Championship	7	0	0	0	4	0	1	0	12	0
Dunfermline Athletic	Total		9	0	0	0	4	0	1	0	14	0
Arbroath	2017–18	Scottish League One	32	0	2	0	3	0	3 (Note: One appearance in the Scottish Challenge Cup and two appearances in the Scottish Championship play-offs)	0	40	0
Airdrieonians	2018–19	Scottish League One	29	0	2	0	0	0	2	0	33	0
Airdrieonians	2019–20	Scottish League One	19	0	2	0	4	0	2	0	27	0
Airdrieonians	2020–21	Scottish League One	2	0	0	0	2	0	0	0	4	0
Airdrieonians	Total		50	0	4	0	6	0	4	0	64	0
Brechin City	2020–21	Scottish League Two	11	0	0	0	0	0	2 (Note: Appearances in the Scottish League Two play-offs)	0	13	0
Alloa Athletic	2021–22	Scottish League One	12	0	0	0	1	0	2	0	15	0
Career total			353	0	19	0	19	0	29	0	420	0

== Honours ==
=== Club ===
Dunfermline Athletic

- Scottish League One: 2015–16

=== Individual ===
- Clyde FC Player of the Year
  - Winner: 2007–08
