= Michael Doherty (footballer) =

Scottish footballer

Personal information
- Date of birth: 20 August 1990 (age 36)
- Place of birth: Lanarkshire, Scotland
- Position: Defender

Youth career
- 2006–2007: Clyde

Senior career*
| Years | Team | Apps | (Gls) |
| 2007–2008 | Clyde | 1 | (0) |
- * Club domestic league appearances and goals as of 17:45, 10 May 2008 (UTC)

Michael Doherty (born 20 August 1990 in Lanarkshire) is a Scottish football defender currently without a club following his release from Clyde. He is a product of Clyde's youth system.

== Career ==
Doherty signed a YTS contract with Clyde in July 2007, and was part of Clyde's Under 19 side.

He made his senior debut on the 14 August 2007, coming on as a substitute against Queen of the South in a 1-0 win in the Scottish League Cup. Doherty made Clyde history on this appearance, becoming the youngest person ever to play for Clyde in a competitive match, at the age of 16 years and 359 days. However, this record was beaten by Connor Stevenson 20 months later. He was released in June 2008 along with the rest of the YTS players.

== See also ==
- Clyde F.C. season 2007-08
