= Richard Offiong =

English footballer (born 1983)

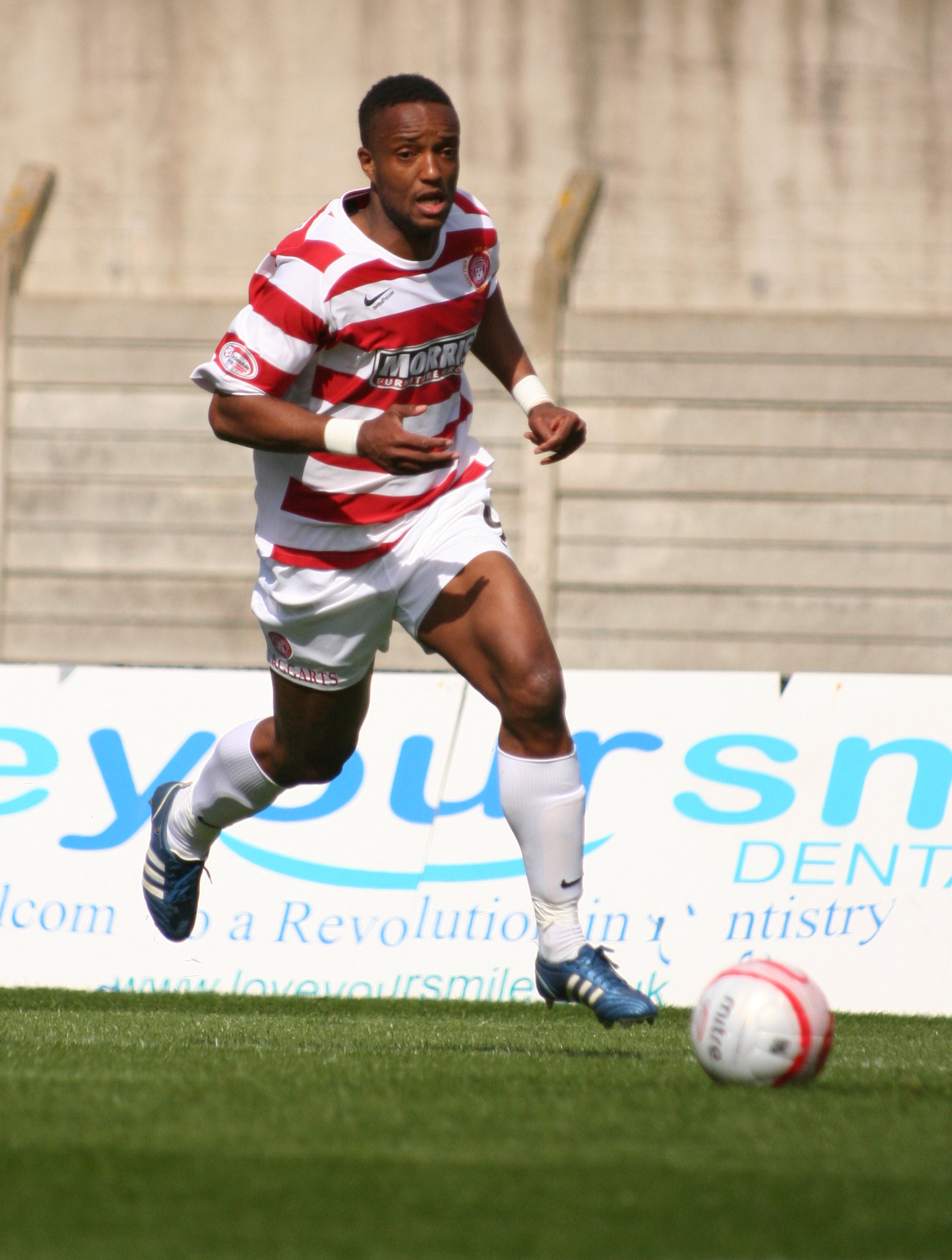
- Offiong playing for Hamilton Academical

Personal information
- Full name: Richard Offiong
- Date of birth: 17 December 1983 (age 42)
- Place of birth: South Shields, England
- Position: Striker

Youth career
- 1999–2002: Newcastle United

Senior career*
Years	Team	Apps	(Gls)
2002–2004	Newcastle United	0	(0)
2002–2003	→ Darlington (loan)	7	(2)
2003	→ Motherwell (loan)	9	(0)
2004	→ York City (loan)	4	(0)
2004	İstanbulspor	1	(0)
2005	Patro Maasmechelen	15	(5)
2005	Jeonnam Dragons	0	(0)
2005–2006	Doncaster Rovers	5	(0)
2006–2009	Hamilton Academical	94	(39)
2009–2011	Carlisle United	15	(1)
2010	→ Östersund (loan)	2	(0)
2010	→ Darlington (loan)	6	(0)
2011	Gateshead	11	(1)
2011	Oakleigh Cannons	4	(1)
2011	Blyth Spartans	3	(0)
2012	Johor FA	0	(0)
2014–2015	Durham City		
2015–	Boldon CA		

International career^{‡}
2002	England U20	3	(0)
- * Club domestic league appearances and goals as of 7 January 2013 (UTC) ‡ National team caps and goals as of 25 January 2009 (UTC)

Richard Offiong (born 17 December 1983) is an English footballer who plays as a striker.

Offiong started his career with Newcastle United as a youth and was capped by England at under-20 level. He was loaned out by the club three times before joining the Doncaster Rovers for one season. He joined Hamilton Academical in 2006 and was named player of the month for August 2007. He netted his first senior hat-trick against Dunfermline Athletic on 9 February 2008. Hamilton Academical secured promotion to the Scottish Premier League and Offiong re-signed with Hamilton through to the end of the 2009–10 season.

Offiong joined the League One team Carlisle United in 2009 leaving in 2011. That March, he joined Conference club Gateshead for a season. He played briefly in 2011 for the Australian side, Oakleigh Cannons. After only a month with Blyth Spartans in 2011, Offiong moved to the Malaysian team Johor FA at the beginning of 2012, but had to retire shortly after, due to injury. In January 2014, two years after retiring, Offiong returned to football signing for Durham City. He left the club in 2015 to sign for Boldon Community Association in the Wearside League.

== Career ==
=== Newcastle United ===
Offiong started his career with Newcastle United as a youth but never made a first team appearance for the club. During his time at Newcastle, Offiong was capped by England at under-20 level and loaned out three times. His first loan out was at Darlington in November 2002 on a two-month loan. Darlington decided not to extend his loan spell for a third month in February. He scored four goals in nine league appearances for the club.

He was then sent out on loan to Motherwell in January 2003 for the rest of the 2002–03 season, where he made nine appearances from the substitutes bench. He joined York City on a month's loan in March 2004 and made four appearances.

=== Overseas ventures and Doncaster Rovers ===
Offiong left Newcastle at the end of the season and during 2004 to 2005 had some brief positions abroad in places like Turkey, South Korea, and Belgium.

But finally Offiong returned home joined the Doncaster Rovers on a free transfer, but was limited to only 5 appearances at the club and subsequently left at the end of the season.

=== Hamilton Academical ===
Hamilton Academical accepted him in 2006 with a contract to keep him at the club until May 2009. He was named player of the month for August 2007. He did well, and netted his first senior hat-trick when Hamilton ran out 3–0 winners at New Douglas Park against Dunfermline Athletic on 9 February 2008. This was also his fifth goal in three games against the former Scottish Premier League.

Hamilton Academical secured promotion to the Scottish Premier League at the end of a hard-fought season. He made his Scottish Premier League debut in a 3–1 victory against Dundee United and scored his first SPL goal with the winner in a 1–0 win against Inverness Caledonian Thistle. He signed a new contract with Hamilton in December that would expire at the end of the 2009–10 season.

=== Carlisle United ===
Despite bids from Colchester United and Greek Super League side Skoda Xanthi, Offiong joined the League One team Carlisle United on 25 August 2009 for £75,000 which would rise to £90,000 if Carlisle achieved promotion to the Championship. Offiong's first goal was on 26 January 2010, against Exeter City in a League game, which Carlisle won 3–2, with Offiong making a last-gasp winner in the 91st minute.

=== Östersunds FK ===
On 30 March 2010, Offiong joined Swedish third-tier team Östersunds FK in a 15-week loan deal, which lasted until 18 July 2010. He teamed up with Ostersunds FK's former Newcastle United, Blackburn Rovers and Livingston player-coach Lee Makel, but his term was cut short by injury after only seven weeks.

One day prior to the 2010–11 Conference National season commencing, Offiong joined Darlington on loan for the second time in his career on an initial one-month deal. After his loan spell at Darlington, Offiong picked up a thigh injury which ruled him out of action for three weeks.

Offiong left Carlisle by mutual consent on 4 January 2011.

=== Gateshead ===
Offiong joined Conference club Gateshead on 4 March, signing a contract until the end of the season. Making his debut the following day in a 1–1 draw with Altrincham at Moss Lane. He scored his first goal for Gateshead on 22 March 2011 against Grimsby Town at Blundell Park. He was released by Gateshead at the end of the season.

=== Oakleigh Cannons ===
In May 2011, Offiong signed for the Australian side Oakleigh Cannons. He made his debut on 29 May 2011 as a 60th-minute substitute in a 1–0 win against Springvale White Eagles. His first goal for Oakleigh came 10 days later in a 2–3 loss against VTC Football.

=== Blyth Spartans ===
On 29 September 2011, Blyth Spartans announced that they had signed the 'jet heeled' striker, following a spell in Australia, hoping that International Clearance would be received in time to face Bedlington Terriers at Croft Park on the following Saturday in the FA Cup. Offiong made his debut for Blyth on 15 October 2011 in a 2–1 win over Whitby Town in the FA Cup Fourth Qualifying Round.

On 13 November 2011, it was announced however that Offiong had left the club after just a month at Blyth.

=== Johor FA ===
Offiong moved to the Malaysian team Johor FA at the beginning of 2012, but had to retire shortly after, due to injury.

=== Durham City ===
In January 2014, two years after retiring, Offiong returned to football signing for Durham City. He left the club in 2015 to sign for Boldon Community Association in the Wearside League.

== Honours ==
Hamilton Academical

- Scottish Football League First Division title winner: 2007–08

== Career statistics ==
As of 12 November 2011.

Appearances and goals by club, season and competition
Club	Season	League^{[A]}		FA Cup		League Cup		Other^{[B]}		Total	
Club	Season	Apps	Goals	Apps	Goals	Apps	Goals	Apps	Goals	Apps	Goals
Newcastle United	2002–03	0	0	0	0	0	0	0	0	0	0
Newcastle United	2003–04	0	0	0	0	0	0	0	0	0	0
Newcastle United	Total	0	0	0	0	0	0	0	0	0	0
Darlington (loan)	2002–03	7	2	2	2	0	0	0	0	9	4
Motherwell (loan)	2002–03	15	0	1	0	0	0	0	0	16	0
York City (loan)	2003–04	4	0	0	0	0	0	0	0	4	0
İstanbulspor	2004–05	1	0							1	0
Patro Maasmechelen	2004–05	15	5							15	5
Jeonnam Dragons	2005	0	0	0	0	1	0	0	0	1	0
Doncaster Rovers	2005–06	9	0	1	0	1	0	2	1	13	1
Hamilton Academical	2006–07	33	14	0	0	1	1	1	1	31	16
Hamilton Academical	2007–08	34	19	2	0	4	2	0	0	40	21
Hamilton Academical	2008–09	30	6	3	0	1	0	0	0	34	6
Hamilton Academical	2009–10	1	0	0	0	0	0	0	0	1	0
Hamilton Academical	Total	97	39	5	0	6	3	1	1	109	43
Carlisle United	2009–10	15	1	0	0	1	0	3	0	19	1
Carlisle United	2010–11	0	0	0	0	0	0	0	0	0	0
Carlisle United	Total	15	1	0	0	1	0	3	0	19	1
Östersund (loan)	2010	2	0							2	0
Darlington (loan)	2010–11	6	0	0	0	0	0	0	0	6	0
Darlington (loan)	Total	13	2	2	2	0	0	0	0	15	4
Gateshead	2010–11	11	1	0	0	0	0	1	0	12	1
Oakleigh Cannons	2011	3	1	0	0	0	0	0	0	3	1
Blyth Spartans	2011–12	3	0	4	0	0	0	0	0	7	0
Career totals		176	49	13	2	8	3	7	2	212	56

A. The "League" column constitutes appearances and goals (including those as a substitute) in The Football League, Scottish Premier League, Scottish Football League, Süper Lig, Belgian Second Division, K-League, Swedish Division 1, Football Conference and Victorian Premier League.
B. The "Other" column constitutes appearances and goals (including those as a substitute) in the Scottish Challenge Cup, Football League Trophy, FA Trophy and play-offs.
