= Dan Kirkup =

English footballer (born 1988)

Personal information
- Full name: Daniel Kirkup
- Date of birth: 19 May 1988 (age 38)
- Place of birth: Hexham, England
- Position: Centre back

Team information
- Current team: Jarrow Roofing/Haltwhistle Jubilee

Senior career*
Years	Team	Apps	(Gls)
2006–2008	Carlisle United	0	(0)
2006–2007	→ Southport (loan)	12	(0)
2007	→ Clyde (loan)	7	(0)
2008	→ Workington (loan)	14	(1)
2008	Workington	17	(0)
2008–	Hawke's Bay United		
- * Club domestic league appearances and goals as of 19:34, 20 November 2008 (UTC)

Daniel Kirkup (born 19 May 1988 in Hexham) is an English football defender playing for Hebburn.

== Career ==
In the summer of 2006 he was offered a pro contract which he accepted after some good performances for the youth and reserve teams he will be pushing for first team appearances. On 28 September 2006 Kirkup went on loan to Southport. He returned to Carlisle United on 11 January 2007, due to United's lack of fit central defenders.

In August 2007, Kirkup joined Scottish First Division side Clyde on loan until January 2007. He made his debut on 1 September 2007, in a Scottish First Division defeat to Dundee. In a 0–0 draw against Queen of the South in December 2007, Kirkup won the Man of the Match award, as he made three goal-line clearances, and had a header at the other end crash off the bar. He made his final appearance for Clyde a week later against Dunfermline Athletic. On 27 February he joined Conference North club Workington on an initial one-month loan deal. He joined Workington on a permanent transfer in June 2008.

In October 2008, it was announced he would leave Workington the following month to play in New Zealand for Hawke's Bay United. He failed to maintain professional status and he currently turns out for Jarrow Roofing as their captain in the Northern League as a semi pro and Haltwhistle Jubilee in the Hexham & District Sunday league. Kirkup now plays for high flying Hexham and District Division 1 league leaders Bardon Mill Bowes Lyons FC. Mill me.

== See also ==
- Clyde F.C. season 2007-08
