= Kevin Bradley (Australian footballer) =

Australian rules footballer

Personal information
- Full name: Kevin Bradley
- Born: 27 October 1931
- Died: 8 February 2013 (aged 81)
- Original team: Mt Hawthorn (WA)/ Myers
- Height: 187 cm (6 ft 2 in)
- Weight: 80 kg (176 lb)

Playing career^{1}
Years	Club	Games (Goals)
1953–54	Essendon	5 (1)
1954	Richmond	6 (10)
Total		11 (11)
- ^{1} Playing statistics correct to the end of 1954.

Kevin Lawrence Bradley (27 October 1931 – 8 February 2013) was an Australian rules footballer who played with Essendon and Richmond in the Victorian Football League (VFL).
