= Julius Raliukonis =

Lithuanian association football player

Personal information
- Date of birth: 2 November 1976 (age 49)
- Place of birth: Lithuania
- Position: Defender

Team information
- Current team: SV Sparkasse Aschach an der Donau (player-coach)

Senior career*
Years	Team	Apps	(Gls)
- Atlantas
- Vėtra
2007-2008	Livingston	9	(0)
2008-2009	Bad Aussee	28	(2)
2009	Dornbirn	14	(0)
2010	SV Schwarzach	13	(3)
2010-2016	UFC Eferding		
2017-2019	SV Gramastetten		
2020-	SV Sparkasse Aschach an der Donau	1	(0)
- * Club domestic league appearances and goals

Julius Raliukonis (born 2 November 1976) is a Lithuanian footballer who is a defender for SV Sparkasse Aschach an der Donau.

== Career ==
In 2007, Raliukonis trialed for St Mirren in the Scottish top flight

In 2008, he trialed for English second division sides Colchester United and Blackpool after playing for Livingston in the Scottish second division.

In 2009, he signed for Austrian second division club Dornbirn from Bad Aussee in the Austrian third division.

In 2010, Raliukonis signed for Austrian fourth division team UFC Eferding.

In 2020, he signed for SV Sparkasse Aschach an der Donau as a player-coach in the Austrian eighth division after playing for Austrian seventh division team SV Gramastetten..

== Personal life ==
Raliukonis is married to Renata.
