= Craig Potter (footballer, born 1984) =

Scottish footballer

Personal information
- Full name: Craig Potter
- Date of birth: 18 September 1984 (age 42)
- Place of birth: Irvine, Scotland
- Height: 5 ft 8 in (1.73 m)
- Position: Defender

Team information
- Current team: Kilwinning Rangers

Senior career*
Years	Team	Apps	(Gls)
2002–2003	Ayr United	0	(0)
2003–2007	Hartwick College	76	(6)
2007	Airdrie United	6	(0)
2007	Clyde	4	(0)
2007–2008	Dumbarton	23	(0)
- Cumnock Juniors
- Dalry Thistle
- Glenafton Athletic
- * Club domestic league appearances and goals as of 28 December 2011

Craig Potter (born 18 September 1984 in Irvine), is a Scottish football defender who plays for Kilwinning Rangers.

== Career ==
Potter started his career with Ayr United, but failed to play a senior game for them.

Potter then won a scholarship with Hartwick College in the U.S., and played college football for 4 years, until January 2007, when he returned to Scotland to sign for Airdrie United. He appeared 6 times for them, and was released at the end of the season.

In August 2007, Potter was signed by Colin Hendry for Clyde on a short-term deal, after impressing in a trial. He made his Clyde debut on the opening day of the season in a 3–2 defeat against Greenock Morton on 4 August 2007.

Potter's one-month contract was not extended, and he left Clyde in September 2007. He joined Dumbarton shortly after. He played 23 league games for the Sons before his release at the end of the 2007–8 season. Dropping down to Junior level, he has since played for Cumnock Juniors and Dalry Thistle before joining Glenafton in June 2011.

Potter is the cousin of former Clyde captain and current St Mirren defender John Potter.

== See also ==
- 2007–08 Clyde F.C. season
