= Christian Smith (footballer) =

English footballer (born 1987)

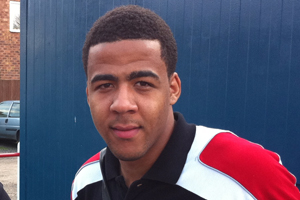
- Smith in 2011

Personal information
- Full name: Christian Daniel Smith
- Date of birth: 10 December 1987 (age 38)
- Place of birth: Crewe, England
- Height: 6 ft 2 in (1.88 m)
- Position: Midfielder

Youth career
- 2004–2006: Port Vale

Senior career*
Years	Team	Apps	(Gls)
2006–2007	Port Vale	1	(0)
2007	→ Cambridge United (loan)	6	(1)
2007	→ Northwich Victoria (loan)	3	(0)
2007–2008	Clyde	25	(0)
2008–2009	Wrexham	8	(1)
2009	York City	15	(2)
2009–2011	Wrexham	34	(6)
2010–2011	→ Newport County (loan)	1	(0)
2011	→ Barrow (loan)	5	(0)
2011	→ Tamworth (loan)	7	(1)
2011–2012	Chester	31	(6)
2012–2013	Nantwich Town	14	(2)
2013	Airbus UK Broughton	0	(0)
2013	Stafford Rangers	2	(0)
2013	AFC Telford United	6	(0)
2013	Stafford Rangers	2	(0)
2013–2015	Chelmsford City	45	(6)
2015	→ Hayes & Yeading United (loan)	12	(3)
2015	Bishop's Stortford	11	(2)
2015–2018	Maidenhead United	89	(5)
2018–2019	Wealdstone	20	(4)
2019–2020	Dulwich Hamlet	29	(4)
2020–2021	Hampton & Richmond Borough	12	(0)
2021	Hayes & Yeading United	0	(0)
2021–2022	Hendon	33	(2)
Total		411	(45)
- * Club domestic league appearances and goals

Christian Daniel Smith (born 10 December 1987) is an English former professional footballer who played as a midfielder. He scored 53 goals in 464 league and cup appearances during a 16-year playing career.

A former Port Vale youth team player, he was a first team squad member in the 2006–07 season, also spending time on loan at Cambridge United and Northwich Victoria. In 2007, he signed with Clyde, moving on to Wrexham a year later. In 2009, he signed with York City, only to return to Wrexham later in the year. After loan spells at Newport County, Barrow and Tamworth, he left the club for a second time in 2011, after which he joined Chester. He helped the club to the Northern Premier League title in 2011–12. He signed with Nantwich Town in August 2012 before joining AFC Telford United in March 2013. He signed with Chelmsford City in June 2013. He was loaned out to Hayes & Yeading United in February 2015 and joined Bishop's Stortford permanently three months later. In November 2015, he joined Maidenhead United and helped the club to the National League South title in 2016–17. He moved on to Wealdstone in November 2018 before joining Dulwich Hamlet in June 2019. He moved on to Hampton & Richmond Borough in September 2020. He rejoined Hayes & Yeading United in July 2021 before moving on to Hendon the following month. He played on the losing side of the 2022 London Senior Cup final.

== Career ==
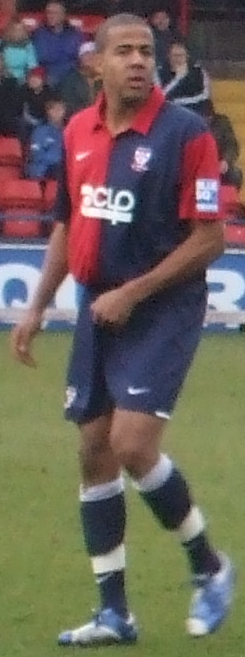
Smith playing for York City in 2009

Born in Crewe, Cheshire, Smith started his career with the Port Vale youth system in 2004. He was to train with the first team in the 2006–07 season and was first involved after being named on the bench in a 1–1 against Hartlepool United on 6 May 2006. He made his debut, and only appearance, on 1 January 2007 against Scunthorpe United in a 0–0 draw after coming on as a 70th minute substitute. He was loaned out to Conference National side Cambridge United on 25 January for a one-month period. He made his debut in a 3–0 victory over Woking on 27 January and scored the winning goal in a 2–1 victory over Stafford Rangers. The loan was extended until 21 April in March, but was recalled on 20 March. He finished the spell with six appearances. He then joined Conference National team Northwich Victoria on loan on 22 March. He debuted in a 4–0 defeat to former club Cambridge on 25 March and finished the spell with three appearances. Smith finished the 2006–07 season with one appearance for Vale, and the club announced on 9 May that he would be released when his contract expired on 30 June.

Smith trialled with League Two team Bury before moving to Scotland to sign with Scottish First Division side Clyde in August. He made his debut in the opening game of the 2007–08 season, a 3–2 defeat away to Greenock Morton on 4 August. Smith started in Clyde's first 11 matches of the season, before being handed a red card against Livingston on 29 September in the 88th minute, which led to him dropping out of the team due to suspension. He returned as an 81st-minute substitute in a 1–0 defeat to Morton on 20 October. Clyde released him in June 2008 after he made 32 appearances.

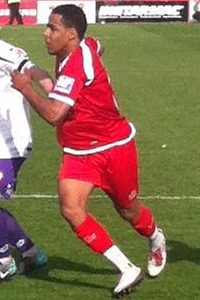
Smith playing for Tamworth in 2011

He had a trial with newly-relegated Conference Premier side Wrexham in August 2008 and was offered an initial one-month contract. He scored Wrexham's fourth goal in a 5–0 victory over Stevenage Borough on 9 August, his debut for the team. He was offered two new contracts at Wrexham in December but rejected these and left on 5 January 2009 following the expiry of his short-term contract. He trialled with League Two side Macclesfield Town and was expected to sign a contract with the club, but this was delayed. He eventually signed for Conference Premier rivals York City on a short-term contract until the end of the 2008–09 season on 15 January. He scored on his debut with a shot from 30 yards (27 m), with York beating Lewes 3–0 on 17 January. This was followed by Smith scoring York's goal with a header in a 2–1 defeat at Eastbourne Borough. York released him following the end of the 2008–09 season, after making 15 appearances and scoring two goals for the team.

He had a trial with former club Wrexham in July and played in the second half of a 0–0 draw with Prestatyn Town in a pre-season friendly. He was offered a contract to return to Wrexham in August.

On 26 November 2010, Smith joined Conference Premier rivals Newport County on loan until January 2011 and made his debut a day later as a 70th-minute substitute in a 2–1 victory over Hayes & Yeading United. This would prove his only Newport appearance. Upon his return to Wrexham in January he was suspended by manager Dean Saunders for insulting the club over Twitter. He was sent out on loan to Barrow later in the month. After five appearances, he returned to Wales, then in March, went on to join Tamworth on an emergency loan. He made seven appearances for Tamworth. In his final appearance, a 2–1 victory over Forest Green Rovers on 30 April, he scored the opening goal of a result that ensured the team's survival from relegation.

Released by Wrexham, he joined Chester of the Northern Premier League Premier Division in August after impressing on trial. The "Blues" stormed to the league title in 2011–12 with a tally of 100 points and thereby won promotion into the Conference North. He left the club at the end of the season. Following his release he spent most of the pre-season on trial with AFC Telford United.

He signed for Jimmy Quinn's Northern Premier League side Nantwich Town in August 2012. He moved on to Airbus UK Broughton in January 2013, before joining AFC Telford United via Stafford Rangers in March 2013, who were struggling to avoid relegation out of the Conference Premier. He returned to Stafford Rangers in mid-April, helping the club to win the Walsall Senior Cup with a 2–1 victory over Walsall. He moved onto Dean Holdsworth's Conference South side Chelmsford City in June 2013. He helped the "Clarets" to a 17th-place finish in 2013–14.

He was loaned out to Conference South rivals Hayes & Yeading United in February 2015. Hayes finished one place above the relegation zone at the end of the 2014–15 season. He signed with Bishop's Stortford just before the start of the 2015–16 season. He switched to Maidenhead United in November 2015. He went on to make 22 league appearances in the 2015–16 campaign as Maidenhead posted a seventh-place finish, and then played 24 league games in 2016–17 as Alan Devonshire's "Magpies" were promoted as champions. He also scored the only goal of the Berks & Bucks Senior Cup final against Hungerford Town. He scored two goals in 36 appearances in the 2017–18 campaign as Maidenhead consolidated their National League status with a 12th-place finish. Smith played 12 times for the "Magpies" in the 2018–19 season, scoring one goal in the FA Cup, before joining Wealdstone on 21 November 2018. He scored five goals in 23 appearances for the "Stones" during the 2018–19 season.

In June 2019, Smith joined Dulwich Hamlet, along with Wealdstone teammate Jeffrey Monakana. Hamlet won three of their opening four games of the 2019–20 season and Smith was quick to praise the training facilities at Champion Hill. On 19 October, he scored the opening goal in a 2–1 victory at Havant & Waterlooville that took the club into the first round Proper of the FA Cup for the first time in 21 years. He also scored in the next round, a 4–1 defeat to Carlisle United. He scored a total of six goals in 32 appearances in the 2019–20 National League South season, which was permanently suspended on 26 March due to the COVID-19 pandemic in England, with Hamlet in 16th-place.

Smith joined Hampton & Richmond Borough on 5 September 2020, rejoining former Maidenhead teammates Rene Steer, Dean Inman and Charlie Wassmer. He made 14 appearances before the 2020–21 season was curtailed early due to the ongoing pandemic. In July 2021, Smith re-signed for Hayes and Yeading United, now in the Southern League Premier Division South. However, he then moved on to Hendon before the start of the 2021–22 season. He scored two goals in 39 appearances – both goals coming in his first two games – throughout the 2021–22 campaign, and was also sent off twice. He featured in the London Senior Cup final defeat to Brentford B, missing a penalty in the shoot-out. Smith left Hendon in June 2022.

== Career statistics ==
Appearances and goals by club, season and competition
Club	Season	League			National cup (Note: Includes FA Cup, Scottish Cup, Welsh Cup)		League cup (Note: Includes Football League Cup, Scottish League Cup, Welsh League Cup)		Other		Total	
Club	Season	Division	Apps	Goals	Apps	Goals	Apps	Goals	Apps	Goals	Apps	Goals
Port Vale	2005–06	League One	0	0	0	0	0	0	0	0	0	0
Port Vale	2006–07	League One	1	0	0	0	0	0	0	0	1	0
Port Vale	Total		1	0	0	0	0	0	0	0	1	0
Cambridge United (loan)	2006–07	Conference National	6	1	0	0	—		0	0	6	1
Northwich Victoria (loan)	2006–07	Conference National	3	0	0	0	—		0	0	3	0
Clyde	2007–08	Scottish First Division	25	0	2	0	1	0	2 (Note: Appearances in Scottish Challenge Cup)	0	30	0
Wrexham	2008–09	Conference Premier	8	1	0	0	0	0	0	0	8	1
York City	2008–09	Conference Premier	15	2	0	0	0	0	0	0	15	2
Wrexham	2009–10	Conference Premier	28	3	1	0	—		0	0	29	3
Wrexham	2010–11	Conference Premier	6	3	0	0	—		0	0	6	3
Wrexham	Total		34	6	1	0	—		0	0	35	6
Newport County (loan)	2010–11	Conference Premier	1	0	0	0	—		0	0	1	0
Barrow (loan)	2010–11	Conference Premier	5	0	0	0	—		0	0	5	0
Tamworth (loan)	2010–11	Conference Premier	7	1	0	0	—		0	0	7	1
Chester	2011–12	NPL Premier Division	31	6	0	0	1	0	6 (Note: Four appearances in FA Trophy, two appearances in Cheshire Senior Cup)	0	38	6
Nantwich Town	2012–13	NPL Premier Division	14	2	0	0	0	0	3 (Note: Appearances and goals in FA Trophy)	1	17	3
Airbus UK Broughton	2012–13	Welsh Premier League	0	0	0	0	0	0	0	0	0	0
Stafford Rangers	2012–13	NPL Premier Division	4	0	0	0	0	0	3 (Note: Appearances and goals in Walsall Senior Cup)	1	7	1
AFC Telford United	2012–13	Conference Premier	6	0	0	0	—		0	0	6	0
Chelmsford City	2013–14	Conference South	28	4	0	0	—		2 (Note: One appearance in FA Trophy and one appearance in Essex Senior Cup)	0	30	4
Chelmsford City	2014–15	Conference South	17	2	4	1	—		1 (Note: Appearances in FA Trophy)	0	22	3
Chelmsford City	Total		45	6	4	1	—		3	0	52	7
Hayes & Yeading United (loan)	2014–15	Conference South	12	3	—				0	0	12	3
Bishop's Stortford	2015–16	National League South	11	2	1	0	—		1 (Note: Appearances in Herts Senior Cup)	0	13	2
Maidenhead United	2015–16	National League South	24	1	—				3 (Note: Two appearances and one goal in FA Trophy, one appearance in Berks & Bucks Senior Cup)	1	27	2
Maidenhead United	2016–17	National League South	24	2	0	0	—		0	0	24	2
Maidenhead United	2017–18	National League	31	2	2	0	—		3	0	36	2
Maidenhead United	2018–19	National League	10	0	2	1	—		0	0	12	1
Maidenhead United	Total		89	5	4	1	—		6	1	99	7
Wealdstone	2018–19	National League South	20	4	0	0	—		4 (Note: Two appearances and one goal in FA Trophy, two appearances in National League South play-offs)	1	24	5
Dulwich Hamlet	2019–20	National League South	29	4	2	2	—		1 (Note: Appearances in FA Trophy)	0	32	6
Hampton & Richmond Borough	2020–21	National League South	12	0	2	0	—		0	0	14	0
Hendon	2021–22	SFL Premier Division South	33	2	0	0	—		6 (Note: 1 appearance in Southern League Cup, 1 appearance in FA Trophy, 1 appearance in Middlesex Senior Cup, 3 appearances in London Senior Cup)	0	39	2
Career total			411	45	16	4	2	0	35	4	464	53

== Honours ==
Chester

- Northern Premier League Premier Division: 2011–12

Stafford Rangers

- Walsall Senior Cup: 2013

Maidenhead United

- National League South: 2016–17
- Berks & Bucks Senior Cup: 2017

Hendon

- London Senior Cup runner-up: 2022
