= Kevin Bradley (Scottish footballer) =

Scottish footballer

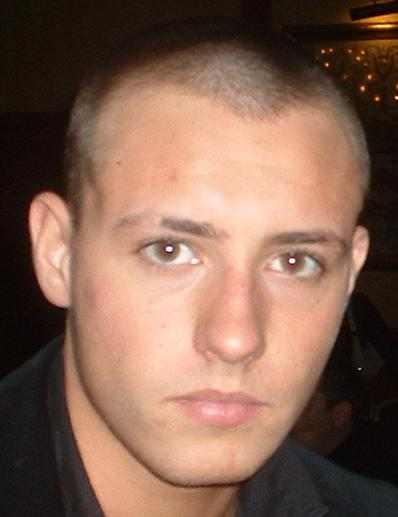

Personal information
- Full name: Kevin Bradley
- Date of birth: 18 June 1986 (age 40)
- Place of birth: Glasgow, Scotland
- Position: Winger

Team information
- Current team: Forth Wanderers

Youth career
- 2001–2003: Clyde

Senior career*
Years	Team	Apps	(Gls)
2003–2008	Clyde	65	(2)
2008–2009	Montrose	30	(6)
2009–2010	Stenhousemuir	20	(0)
2010–2012	Pollok	60	(16)
2012–2013	Kirkintilloch Rob Roy		
2013	Petershill		
2013–2016	Pollok		
2016	Rossvale		
2016–	Forth Wanderers		
- * Club domestic league appearances and goals as of 18:00, 16 October 2016 (UTC)

Kevin Bradley (born 18 June 1986) is a Scottish football midfielder who plays for Forth Wanderers in the Scottish Junior Football Association, West Region. He has previously played in the Scottish Football League First Division with Clyde.

== Career ==
Bradley signed a YTS contract with Clyde in the summer of 2003 and was given a professional contract in June 2004. He made his senior debut coming on as a substitute in Clyde's 1–0 Scottish Challenge Cup win over Stranraer in August of that year and made his first league appearance in the First Division the following week against St Mirren.

Bradley never cemented his place as a first team regular in his first few seasons at Clyde. Bradley's versatility and pace are seen as being important to his game, and in his Clyde career, he has filled in at wing-back, wide midfield, central midfield, and as a forward.

Bradley signed a new contract with Clyde in July 2007, which made him Clyde's longest serving player. He was given an extended run in the team under Colin Hendry, and scored his first senior goal in December 2007 against St Johnstone, from 25 yards out. His second senior goal also came against St Johnstone, scoring the first in an important 2–1 win at McDiarmid Park in March 2008.

He left the club in July 2008, and joined Montrose, where he scored 6 goals, before leaving the club in May 2009. He joined Stenhousemuir in July 2009.

Bradley was released by Stenny at the end of the 2009–10 season.

Bradley signed for Junior club Pollok in the summer of 2010 and moved to Kirkintilloch Rob Roy two years later. With Rob Roy clearing out their entire squad at the end of the 2012–13 season, Bradley signed for Petershill in July 2013 before re-joining Pollok in September.

Bradley left Pollok in the summer of 2016 and signed for Forth Wanderers in October that year.

== See also ==
- 2004–05 Clyde F.C. season | 2005–06 | 2006–07 | 2007–08
