= Marvyn Wilson =

Scottish footballer

Personal information
- Full name: Marvyn Wilson
- Date of birth: 1 December 1973 (age 52)
- Place of birth: Bellshill, Scotland
- Position: Central midfielder

Team information
- Current team: Linlithgow Rose

Senior career*
Years	Team	Apps	(Gls)
1990–1992	Heart of Midlothian	0	(0)
1992–1999	Airdrieonians	137	(5)
1999–2002	Ayr United	73	(4)
2002–2005	Airdrie United	98	(4)
2005–2007	Hamilton Academical	47	(1)
2007–2010	Clyde	52	(0)
- * Club domestic league appearances and goals as of 17:04, 1 May 2010 (UTC)

Marvyn Wilson (born 1 December 1973) is a Scottish former football midfielder. He notably played for professional clubs including Airdrieonians and Hamilton Academical.

== Career ==
Wilson started his career with Hearts, but did not play a senior game for them. He joined the now defunct Airdrieonians, and stayed at the club for seven years. From there he joined Ayr United in 1999. He was an important part of the Ayr team that reached the final of the Scottish League Cup and the semi-final of the Scottish Cup in 2002.

Wilson joined Airdrie United in July 2002, who were in their first season in the Scottish Football League, having risen from the ashes of the liquidated Airdrieonians. He stayed there for three years before joining local rivals Hamilton Academical, where he was made club captain. Injury disrupted his time there, and he was let go in May 2007.

Wilson appeared as a trialist for Clyde in their opening league game of the 2007–08 campaign against Greenock Morton, and signed a short-term deal two days later. Wilson extended his contract until the end of the season in January 2008. He signed a new contract in July 2008, and was given the role of club captain. Wilson was released by Clyde in June 2009 along with the rest of the out of contract players, due to the club's financial position. However, almost three months later, he rejoined the club for training, and appeared as a trialist in their Scottish Second Division match with Alloa Athletic on 29 August. He signed a new contract with the club in October 2009. He left the club in May 2010, after his contract was not renewed.

Wilson was brought in as assistant manager at Scottish Junior Side Linlithgow Rose.

== See also ==
- Clyde F.C. season 2007–08 | 2008–09 | 2009–10
