= Běstvina =

- Municipality
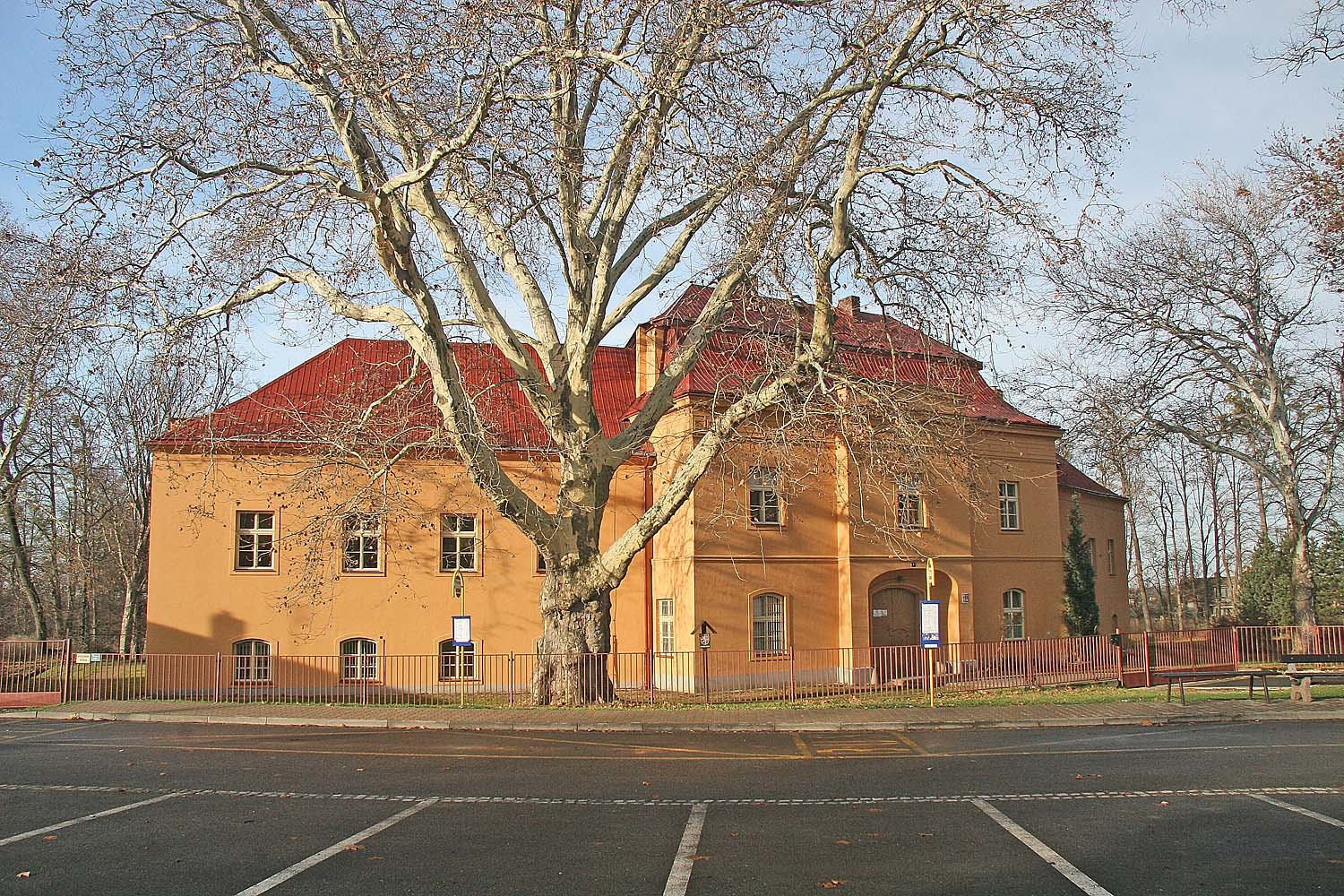
- Běstvina Castle

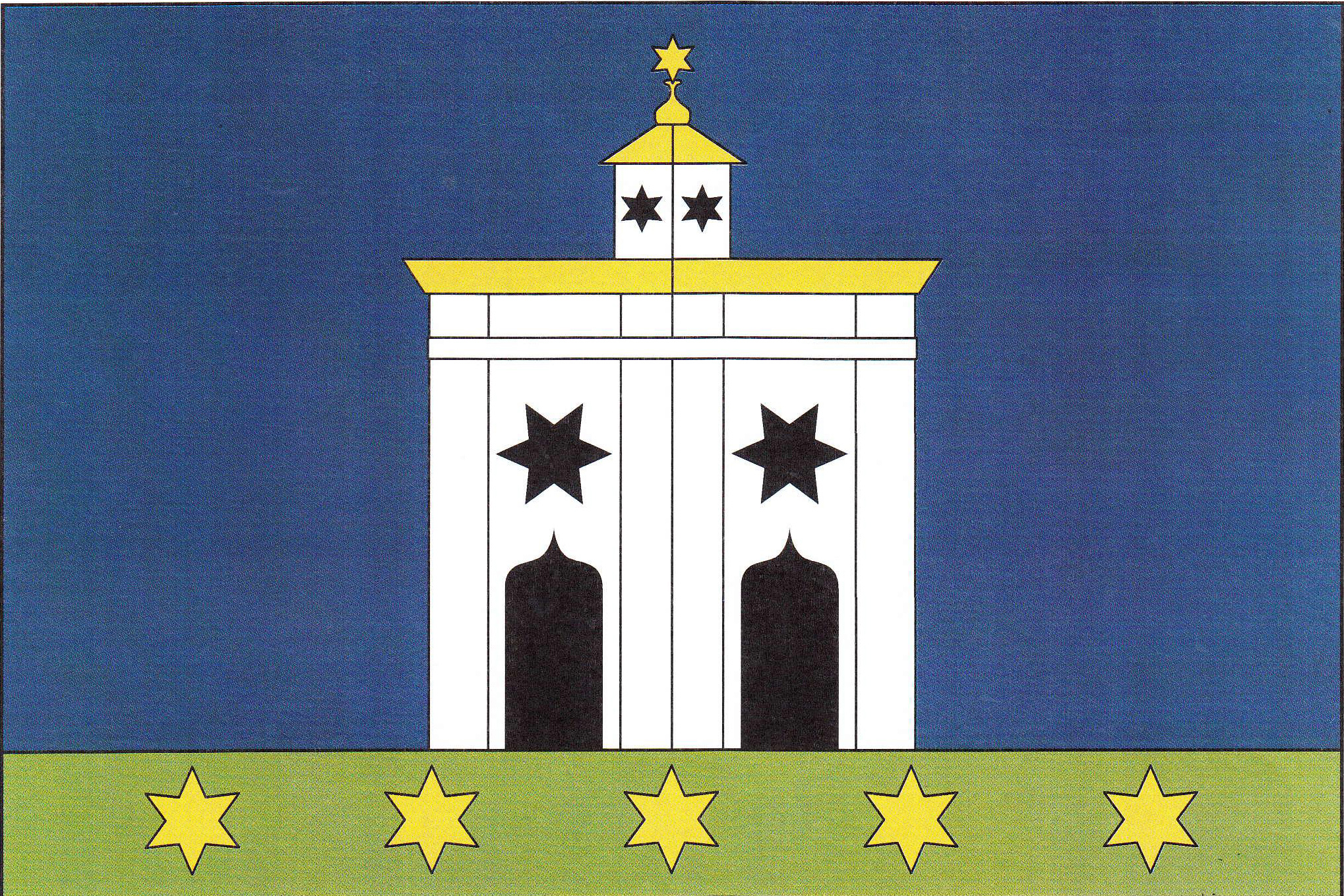
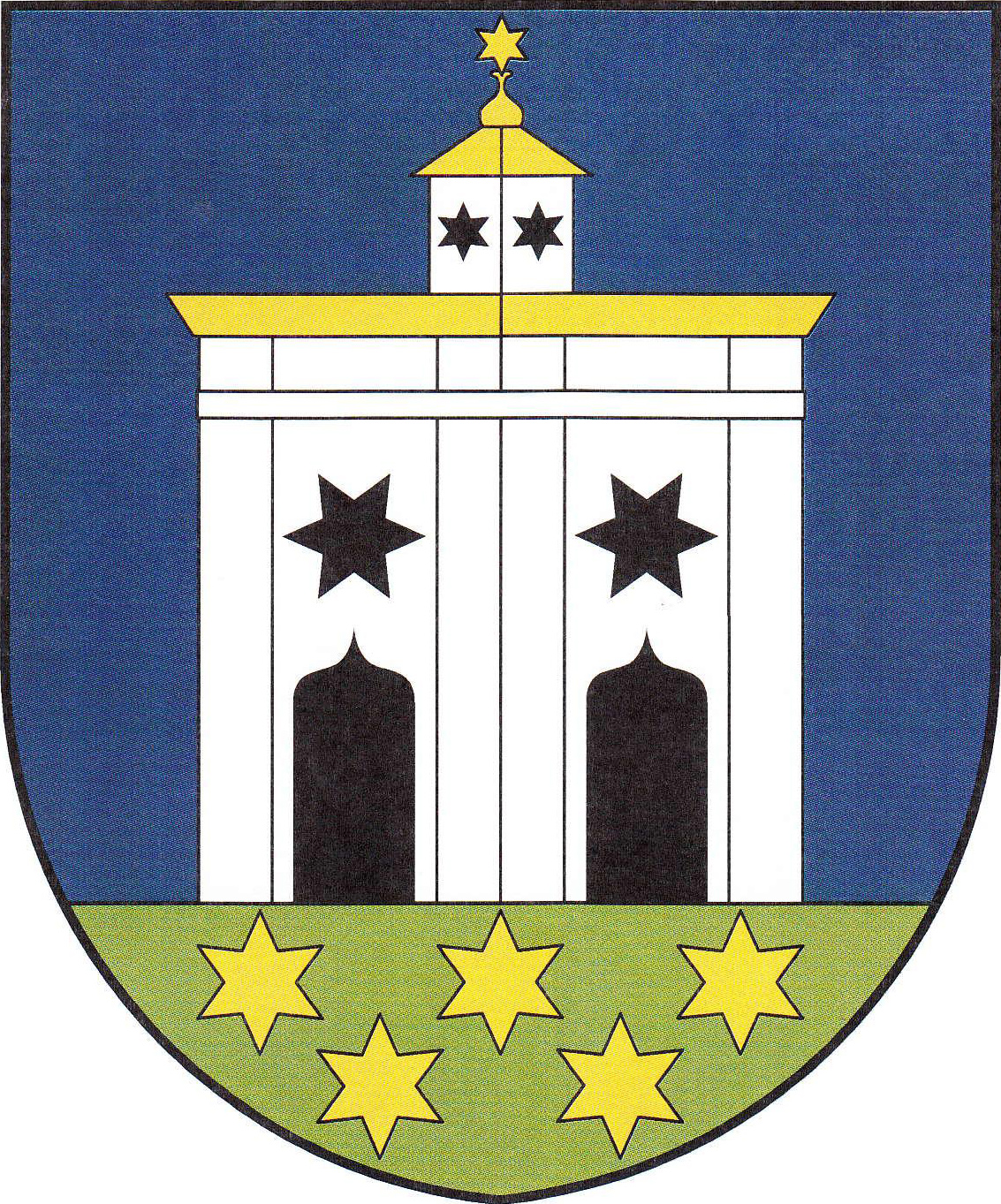
- Flag Coat of arms

- Location in the Czech Republic
- Coordinates: 49°50′14″N 15°35′45″E
- Country: Czech Republic
- Region: Pardubice
- District: Chrudim
- First mentioned: 1137

Area
  - Total: 14.08 km^{2} (5.44 sq mi)
- Elevation: 338 m (1,109 ft)

Population (2026-01-01)
  - Total: 555
  - Density: 39.4/km^{2} (102/sq mi)
- Time zone: UTC+1 (CET)
  - Summer (DST): UTC+2 (CEST)
- Postal codes: 538 43, 538 45
- Website: www.obecbestvina.cz

Běstvina is a municipality and village in Chrudim District in the Pardubice Region of the Czech Republic. It has about 600 inhabitants.

== Administrative division ==
Běstvina consists of five municipal parts (in brackets population according to the 2021 census):

- Běstvina (260)
- Pařížov (74)
- Rostejn (73)
- Spačice (47)
- Vestec (80)

== Demographics ==
Historical population
Year	Pop.	±%
1869	1,348	—
1880	1,501	+11.4%
1890	1,304	−13.1%
1900	1,212	−7.1%
1910	1,226	+1.2%
1921	1,218	−0.7%
1930	1,184	−2.8%
1950	876	−26.0%
1961	945	+7.9%
1970	803	−15.0%
1980	691	−13.9%
1991	518	−25.0%
2001	540	+4.2%
2011	514	−4.8%
2021	534	+3.9%
Source: Censuses
