= Neil McCallum (footballer, born 1987) =

Scottish footballer

Personal information
- Full name: Neil Stephen McCallum
- Date of birth: 31 August 1987 (age 39)
- Place of birth: Scotland
- Position: Striker

Senior career*
Years	Team	Apps	(Gls)
2004–2008	St. Johnstone	2	(0)
2006–2007	→ Alloa Athletic (loan)	8	(2)
2007	→ Forfar Athletic (loan)	12	(5)
2008–2009	Kinnoull		
2009–?	Bankfoot Athletic		
- * Club domestic league appearances and goals as of 18:12, 10 January 2008 (UTC)

Neil Stephen McCallum (born 31 August 1987) is a Scottish footballer who plays as a striker. He began his career with St Johnstone.

== Playing career ==
McCallum progressed through the youth system of St Johnstone and had loan spells with Alloa Athletic and Forfar Athletic before injuries forced him to leave full-time football in 2008. He signed for Perth-based junior club Kinnoull in August 2008. He then signed for Bankfoot Athletic in February 2009, having been on the transfer list at Kinnoull.
