= Stuart Soane =

Scottish footballer

Personal information
- Date of birth: 5 November 1987 (age 38)
- Place of birth: Dunfermline, Scotland
- Position: Midfielder

Team information
- Current team: Forres Mechanics

Senior career*
Years	Team	Apps	(Gls)
2005–2007	Inverness Caledonian Thistle	1	(0)
2007–2008	Peterhead	8	(0)
2008–2011	Huntly		
2011–2013	Formartine United		
2013–2022	Forres Mechanics		
- * Club domestic league appearances and goals as of 09:47, 31 January 2009 (UTC)

Stuart Soane (born 5 November 1987) is a former Scottish footballer who last played for Forres Mechanics in the Highland Football League.

He began his career after signing a full-time contract with Inverness Caledonian Thistle in the summer of 2005, having come through the club's youth system. He made his debut in a 2–0 defeat of Falkirk on 3 May 2006. He left the club in the summer of 2007.

Later that summer he signed for Peterhead on a part-time contract. Soane then signed a contract to play for Highland League side Huntly in July 2008.

In July 2011, Soane left Huntly and signed for fellow Highland League side, Formartine United, before signing for Forres Mechanics in the summer of 2013, where he played until retiring in July 2022.
