= Billy Gibson (footballer, born 1981) =

Scottish footballer

Personal information
- Full name: William Gibson
- Date of birth: 1 August 1981 (age 45)
- Place of birth: Bellshill, Scotland
- Positions: Defender; midfielder

Team information
- Current team: Kilbirnie Ladeside

Youth career
- 1997–1999: Rangers

Senior career*
Years	Team	Apps	(Gls)
1999–2004	Rangers	0	(0)
2004	→ Partick Thistle (loan)	16	(0)
2004–2007	Partick Thistle	84	(5)
2007–2008	St Patrick's Athletic	17	(3)
2008–2009	Clyde	44	(0)
2009–2010	Ayr United	25	(0)
2010–2011	Alloa Athletic	17	(2)
2012–2014	Linlithgow Rose		
2014–	Kilbirnie Ladeside		
- * Club domestic league appearances and goals as of 19:10, 8 August 2014

William Gibson (born 1 August 1981) is a Scottish footballer who plays as a defender or a midfielder for Kilbirnie Ladeside in the Scottish Junior Football Association, West Region. He has previously played in the Scottish Premier League for Partick Thistle.

== Club career ==
He started his career with Rangers, before moving to fellow Glasgow club Partick Thistle on loan for the first half of 2004. He was released by Rangers that summer, and joined Thistle on a permanent transfer in July 2004. This spell lasted 3 years, before he moved to Ireland to play for St Patrick's Athletic in June 2007.

Gibson moved back to Scotland in January 2008, and signed for Partick Thistle's rivals, Clyde. He was signed by John Brown, who coached him during his spell with Rangers. He made his debut in a 3–1 defeat by Stirling Albion on 2 February 2008. Gibson's contract was terminated in June 2009, following Clyde's relegation and financial troubles.

Gibson went on to sign for First Division newcomers Ayr United, before joining Alloa Athletic for the 2010–11 season. He then spent almost a year out of football before joining Junior side Linlithgow Rose in the summer of 2012. Gibson moved on to Kilbirnie Ladeside in August 2014.

== See also ==
- Clyde F.C. season 2007-08 | 2008–09
