= Jimmy Gibson (footballer, born 1980) =

Scottish footballer

Personal information
- Full name: James Robert Gibson
- Date of birth: 19 February 1980 (age 46)
- Place of birth: Bellshill, Scotland
- Height: 1.73 m (5 ft 8 in)
- Position: Central midfielder

Senior career*
Years	Team	Apps	(Gls)
1996–2003	Rangers	3	(0)
2003–2005	Clyde	57	(5)
2005–2008	Partick Thistle	61	(4)
2008	Clyde	6	(0)
2008	East Stirlingshire	3	(0)
Total		129	(9)
- * Club domestic league appearances and goals

James Robert Gibson (born 19 February 1980 in Bellshill) is a Scottish retired footballer.

== Career ==
Gibson began his career with Rangers, and made three appearances before being signed by Alan Kernaghan for Clyde. Gibson made his Clyde debut against Brechin City in August 2003. Gibson had a very good first season, and was an integral part of the side that missed promotion to the Scottish Premier League by 1 point. He scored 4 goals in 29 appearances. Gibson scored in Clyde's derby victory over Partick Thistle on the opening day of the 2004–05 season, but was shown a red card in the closing stages.

Gibson surprised many fans when he opted to jump down a division to join recently relegated Partick Thistle in June 2005. Gibson was captain of Thistle under manager Dick Campbell. On 11 June 2007 he signed a two-year contract after negotiations with manager Ian McCall, however, this contract was cancelled by mutual consent in January 2008.

Gibson then re-joined previous club Clyde, who had recently appointed John Brown as manager, who coached Gibson in his days as a Rangers youth. He made his second Clyde debut in a 2–1 defeat in the Scottish First Division to Dunfermline Athletic on 23 February 2008. Gibson played a starring role in Clyde's playoff victory to keep them in the First Division, though he surprised many by rejecting to sign a new contract, thus leaving the club to go part-time with East Stirlingshire.

Gibson retired from professional football on 20 October 2008 due to a recurring knee injury. Gibson's final game of his career was a 2–1 defeat away against Annan Athletic.

== See also ==
- Clyde F.C. season 2004-05 | 2007–08
