= Evangelino Valentim =

Nigerian footballer

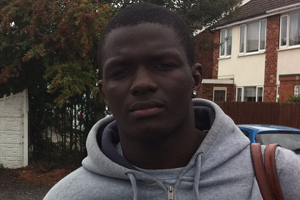
- Valentim at The Lamb Ground in 2011

Personal information
- Full name: Evangelino Nizzola Mendes Valentim
- Date of birth: 24 December 1984 (age 41)
- Place of birth: Portugal
- Height: 6 ft 7 in (2.01 m)
- Position: Striker

Senior career*
Years	Team	Apps	(Gls)
2005–2006	Maidenhead United	1	(0)
2007–2008	Clyde	2	(0)
2011	Tamworth	1	(0)
- * Club domestic league appearances and goals as of 00:00, 18 September 2011 (UTC)

Evangelino Nizzola Mendes Valentim (born 24 December 1984) is a Nigerian footballer who plays as a striker. He most recently played in England for the Conference National side Tamworth.

== Career ==
=== Early career ===
Valentim made his one and only start for Maidenhead United in a 3–3 draw at Eastbourne Borough in a Conference South fixture on New Year's Eve 2005. He was substituted at half-time. He was subsequently named as a substitute for a Berks & Bucks Senior Cup tie with Beaconsfield SYCOB on 9 January 2006, which the Magpies lost 4–2 on penalties.

Valentim had unsuccessful trial spells with Derby County and Metz in 2006. While at Derby County, he featured for the club's development team in a 3–1 loss at Boston United and reserve team in a 3–1 defeat at Mansfield Town. While at Metz, he netted twice for the reserve team in a 4–2 win against CSO Amnéville.

Before joining Scottish club Clyde, Valentim was last registered with Shooting Star in his home country of Nigeria.

=== Clyde ===
Valentim signed for Scottish First Division club Clyde by manager Colin Hendry on 21 September 2007 on amateur terms. The club signed Valentim after receiving positive reports from clubs in England where he'd had trial spells. He went straight into the squad for the league match against Dunfermline Athletic the next day, but was an unused substitute. He made his debut in a 4-2 league defeat at Livingston on 29 September 2007, with 15 minutes remaining and almost netted with his first effort at goal.

Valentim missed out on making a late second-half substitute appearance in the league match at Stirling Albion on 6 October 2007 because he had lost his shirt. Valentim only made two further substitute appearances, in a league defeat to Morton on 20 October 2007 and a Scottish Cup win over Montrose on 24 November 2007. He was released by new manager John Brown after not being offered a new contract in late January 2008. Valentim did appear as an unused substitute on a further four occasions.

Valentim's only goal for the first team came in a 1–1 draw against Queen's Park in a closed doors friendly on 4 October 2007. He did, however, score a total of six goals while playing for the reserve team in the Reserve League Cup during his time at Broadwood including a hat-trick against Raith Rovers and a brace against East Stirling. It was a competition they went on to win even after Valentim was released.

=== Tamworth ===
Valentim signed for the Conference National side Tamworth on 26 August 2011 after impressing whilst on trial with the club, He had been awaiting international clearance from Portugal, and once it arrived the player was named as a substitute in the 2–1 home win against York City on 8 September. Valentim made his debut for the club in the Birmingham Senior Cup first round tie against Boldmere St. Michaels. The game ended 1–0 with Valentim's goal. Valentim made just one league appearance for Tamworth before leaving the club in October 2011.
