= Dušan Bestvina =

Slovak footballer

Personal information
- Date of birth: 21 April 1981 (age 44)
- Place of birth: Trnava, Czechoslovakia
- Height: 1.83 m (6 ft 0 in)
- Position: Defender

Senior career*
Years	Team	Apps	(Gls)
1999–2001	Banská Bystrica		
2001–2005	Spartak Trnava	66	(1)
2005–2007	FC Mistelbach		
2007–2008	Clyde	23	(0)
- * Club domestic league appearances and goals

Dušan Bestvina (born 21 April 1981) is a Slovak semi-retired football defender. He played as a right back or a centre back. Since 2008, he plays only on amateur level.

== Career ==
Bestvina started his career at his hometown club FK Dukla Banská Bystrica, before moving to FC Spartak Trnava in 2001, where he spent four years. He then joined Austrian side FC Mistelbach in 2005.

Bestvina came to Scotland in the summer of 2007, and signed for Clyde on 14 September 2007, originally on an amateur contract. He made his debut the following day in a Scottish First Division match against Queen of the South.

He was rewarded for several good displays with a new 18-month professional contract in January 2008. He left Clyde in June 2008, after agreeing to have his contract terminated. He returned to former club FC Mistelbach after his release.

== See also ==
- 2007–08 Clyde F.C. season
