= Pat Clarke =

Scottish footballer (born 1985)

Personal information
- Date of birth: 18 May 1985 (age 41)
- Place of birth: Edinburgh, Scotland
- Position: Forward

Youth career
- Hibernian

Senior career*
Years	Team	Apps	(Gls)
2003–2005	Dunfermline Athletic	2	(0)
2004–2005	→ Berwick Rangers (loan)	10	(6)
2005–2006	Raith Rovers	18	(9)
2005	→ Arbroath (loan)	13	(9)
2006–2008	Cowdenbeath	44	(19)
2008–2009	Clyde	40	(27)
2009–2010	Dundee	17	(9)
2010–2012	Dunfermline Athletic	33	(9)
2012	→ Raith Rovers (loan)	15	(8)
2012–2013	Raith Rovers	35	(22)
2013–2014	East Fife	21	(14)
Total		248	(132)
- * Club domestic league appearances and goals

Patrick Clarke (born 18 May 1985) is a Scottish retired footballer who played as a forward. Clarke started his career with Dunfermline Athletic who he played for over two spells. He has also played for Raith Rovers, Cowdenbeath, Clyde, Dundee and East Fife, as well as Berwick Rangers and Arbroath on loan.

== Career ==
=== Fife ===
Clarke who was born in Edinburgh started his career at Hibernian before joining Dunfermline Athletic. He made his senior debut on 17 April 2004, in a 1–1 draw with Dundee United. His next appearance was a month later, when he came on as a substitute against Rangers. He joined Berwick Rangers on loan from October 2004 to January 2005. He was released by Dunfermline when he returned from his loan.

Clarke then joined Fife rivals Raith Rovers. He made his debut against Clyde on 12 February 2005, and scored two goals. Clarke joined Arbroath on a six-month loan in August 2005, and got his first senior hat-trick when Arbroath beat East Stirlingshire 7–2 in November 2005. Clarke returned to Rovers in January, and remained there until the end of the season.

Clarke joined another Fife club, Cowdenbeath in July 2006. He made a great start to his career at Central Park, scoring 4 goals in his first four games. His rich vein of form continued throughout the season, and he scored 5 goals in one match versus Stranraer in March 2007. He ended the season with 17 goals. Clarke got his third career hat-trick against former club Berwick Rangers in October 2007.

=== Clyde & Dundee ===
On 15 January 2008, it was announced Clarke had signed a pre-contract agreement with Scottish First Division side Clyde. However, both clubs agreed a fee which allowed Clarke to move to Broadwood Stadium on 29 January 2008. He made his debut in a 3–1 defeat by Stirling Albion on 2 February 2008. He scored his first goal three weeks later, netting Clyde's only goal in a defeat to Dunfermline Athletic, from the penalty spot. Despite scoring a double on the final day of the season in a 3–0 win over Stirling Albion, Clyde still finished in the playoff position due to Greenock Morton winning. However, he netted once in a 6–5 aggregate win over Alloa in the playoffs semifinals, and scored a goal in both legs of the 3–0 aggregate final win over Airdrie United. Clarke's contract was terminated in June 2009, following Clyde's relegation and financial troubles. He went on to sign for Dundee on a three-year contract.

=== Fife return ===
On 15 July 2010 it was announced that Pat Clarke had been released by Dundee so he could join Dunfermline Athletic on a 2-year contract. On 1 January 2012, he signed on loan to First Division Raith Rovers. In June 2012 Clarke signed a permanent deal with the Stark's Park side following his release by Dunfermline. Clarke signed for East Fife in July 2013, playing for the side for just one season before leaving in May 2014.

== Honours ==
Dundee

- Scottish Challenge Cup: 2009–10
