= Livingston F.C. B Team and Academy =

Livingston Academy
- Full name: Livingston Football Club Academy
- Nickname: Livingston Colts
- Website: www.livingstonfc.co.uk
Home colours	Away colours

In addition to their senior squad, Livingston Football Club also operate a football Academy which contains a number of football teams culminating in an under-18 side.

== History ==
The club's youth academy has produced the likes of Robert Snodgrass, Graham Dorrans and Leigh Griffiths, who have all gone on to play for Scotland.

Livingston disbanded their youth academy teams in 2018, due to financial and governance pressures following being placed in the bottom tier of the new youth structure by Project Brave.

They reformed their youth academy in January 2022 following approval from the Scottish FA Licensing Committee.

== Players ==
- In addition to below, Livingston F.C. Academy also operates youth sides from under-11 upwards.
- Some academy players on a domestic loan can still feature for the youth sides, but cannot play for the first team.

=== Squad ===
As of 30 August 2025

Note: Flags indicate national team as defined under FIFA eligibility rules; some limited exceptions apply. Players may hold more than one non-FIFA nationality.

No.	Pos.	Nation	Player
—	GK	SCO	Evan Myles
—	DF	SCO	Marshall Boyd
—	DF	SCO	Jay McFarlane-Letham
—	DF	SCO	Matthew McCaffrey
—	DF	SCO	Duncan Wright
—	MF	SCO	Johnny Armstrong
—	MF	SCO	Ciaran Maguire
—	MF	SCO	Liam Woods
—	MF	SCO	Ethan Price
—	MF	SCO	Kerr Honeyman
—	MF	SCO	Harvey Petrie
—	MF	SCO	Keir Allan
—	MF	SCO	Codi Stark
—	MF	SCO	Mackenzye Campbell
—	FW	SCO	Sam Culbert

== Manager history ==
Livingston's reserve side, in its various guises, has had several managers and coaches during its operation. For many years the long-standing name of the second string was the Reserve team, however, due to internal restructuring it was more recently known as the Under-20 team, then the Development squad and currently B team. As consequently the title of the manager overseeing the team changed to reflect this. Below is a list of individuals who oversaw the reserve side since approximately 1995.

Name	From	To	Tenure	Title
(Scotland) John McLaughlan	1996	2003	7 years	Coaching and Development manager
(Scotland) Tony Fitzpatrick	2003	2005	2 years	Head of youth development
(Scotland) Graeme Robertson	2005	2009	4 years	Head of youth development
(Scotland) Brian Welsh	2009	2012	3 years	Head of youth development
(England) Richie Burke	2012	2013	1 year	Head of youth development
(Scotland) Jimmy Dunn & Peter Main	2016	2018	2 years	Heads of youth development
(Scotland) Jimmy Dunn	2020	2021	1 year	Head of youth development
(Scotland) Gary Hocknull	2021	2022	1 year	Head of youth development
(Scotland) Jason Little	2022	2024	2 years	Head of youth development
(Scotland) George Cairns	2025	Present		Academy director

== Staff ==
As of 1 June 2025

Position	Name
Academy director	George Cairns
Head of youth programme	Callum Jeffrey
Head of professional programme	Colin Jack
U16 coach	Liam Campbell
U16 coach	Dean Ritchie
U14 coach	Fraser McCallum
U14 coach	Velichko Yankov
U13 phase coach	Robert Neil
U13 coach	Murray Scott
U12 coach	Joe Roy
U12 coach	Kerrin Smith
U12 coach	Mark Molloy
U11 coach	Peter Godwin
U11 coach	Glenn McFarlane
Academy goalkeeper coach	Cameron Gorrie
Academy goalkeeper coach	Martin Scott

== Academy legacy ==
=== Financial return ===
The combined transfer fees for all Academy graduates is, to date, approximately £1.6m. The list below includes players who have been schooled at the club's Academy and have commanded a transfer upon their departure.

First-team graduates transfer fees received
#	Name and nationality	Date of transfer	New club	Initial fee	Add ons	Total fee
1	(Scotland) Graham Dorrans	31 January 2008	West Bromwich Albion (England)	£100k	✓	£100k
2	(Scotland) Robert Snodgrass	25 July 2008	Leeds United (England)	£35k	✗	£35k
3	(Northern Ireland) James McPake	2 February 2009	Coventry City (England)	£350k	✗	£350k
4	(Scotland) Murray Davidson	14 May 2009	St Johnstone (Scotland)	£50k	✗	£50k
5	(Scotland) Leigh Griffiths	24 June 2009	Dundee (Scotland)	£125k	✗	£125k
6	(Scotland) Andy Halliday	6 May 2010	Middlesbrough (England)	£200k	✗	£200k
7	(Scotland) Stefan Scougall	24 January 2014	Sheffield Utd (England)	£182k	✗	£182k
8	(Scotland) Coll Donaldson	30 January 2014	QPR (England)	£150k	✗	£150k
9	(Scotland) Marc McNulty	19 May 2014	Sheffield Utd (England)	£125k	✗	£125k
10	(Scotland) Danny Mullen	1 January 2018	St Mirren (Scotland)	£200k	✗	£200k

=== List of Academy graduates ===
Below is a list of players who made a first-team appearance for Livingston, whilst a youth team player at the club. This includes both players that have come through the club's Academy set-up and also young professional players signed for the academy who then go on to play in the first-team.

Players in bold are currently at the club.

First-team graduates
#	Name and nationality	Date of debut	Age at debut	Apps	Goals	Pro debut	Int caps
1	(Scotland) David McEwan	1 May 2001	19 years, 64 days	5	0	✓	✗
2	(Scotland) Richard Brittain	14 January 2002	18 years, 112 days	65	4	✓	✗
3	(Northern Ireland) James McPake	3 April 2004	19 years, 284 days	100	6	✓	✓
4	(Scotland) Graham Dorrans	11 September 2004	17 years, 129 days	77	16	✓	✓
5	(Scotland) Robert Snodgrass	11 September 2004	17 years, 4 days	79	15	✓	✓
6	(Scotland) Stephen Adam	27 November 2004	18 years, 17 days	7	0	✓	✗
7	(Scotland) Martin Scott	31 July 2005	19 years, 166 days	19	0	✓	✗
8	(Scotland) Scott Boyd	20 August 2005	19 years, 77 days	4	0	✓	✗
9	(Scotland) Allan Walker	31 July 2005	19 years, 209 days	72	3	✓	✗
10	(Scotland) Gary Miller	29 October 2005	18 years, 197 days	40	0	✓	✓
11	(Scotland) Steven Weir	3 May 2006	17 years, 212 days	18	1	✓	✗
12	(Scotland) Murray Davidson	25 November 2006	18 years, 263 days	37	7	✓	✓
13	(Scotland) Leigh Griffiths	30 December 2006	16 years, 132 days	48	22	✓	✓
14	(Scotland) Kenny Adamson	14 April 2007	18 years, 8 days	6	0	✓	✗
15	(Scotland) Mark Torrance	21 April 2007	18 years, 243 days	3	0	✓	✗
16	(South Africa) Keaghan Jacobs	24 November 2007	18 years, 76 days	319	33	✓	✗
17	(Scotland) Christopher Malone	23 February 2008	17 years, 343 days	37	0	✓	✗
18	(Scotland) David Sinclair	19 April 2008	17 years, 271 days	114	6	✓	✗
19	(Scotland) Andy Halliday	26 April 2008	16 years, 198 days	45	15	✓	✗
20	(Scotland) Gordon Smith	26 April 2008	17 years, 72 days	5	0	✓	✗
21	(Scotland) Cameron MacDonald	13 September 2008	18 years, 285 days	118	1	✓	✗
22	(South Africa) Kyle Jacobs	21 February 2009	17 years, 252 days	144	10	✓	✗
23	(Scotland) Neil Hastings	1 August 2009	17 years, 121 days	3	0	✓	✗
24	(Scotland) Joe McKee	1 August 2009	16 years, 274 days	1	0	✓	✗
25	(Scotland) Marc McNulty	31 October 2009	17 years, 47 days	48	22	✓	✓
26	(Scotland) Darren Jamieson	27 April 2010	19 years, 71 days	82	0	✓	✗
27	(Scotland) Stefan Scougall	16 October 2010	17 years, 313 days	70	9	✓	✗
28	(Scotland) Callum Fordyce	23 April 2011	18 years, 304 days	95	7	✓	✗
29	(Scotland) Ross Docherty	7 May 2011	18 years, 104 days	30	0	✓	✗
30	(South Africa) Michael Travis	23 July 2011	18 years, 78 days	1	0	✓	✗
31	(Scotland) Dean Cummings	15 October 2011	18 years, 200 days	11	1	✓	✗
32	(Scotland) Andrew Russell	12 November 2011	18 years, 227 days	8	0	✓	✗
33	(Scotland) Dylan Easton	11 February 2012	17 years, 311 days	6	0	✓	✗
34	(Scotland) Connor McDonald	7 April 2012	17 years, 358 days	12	0	✓	✗
35	(Scotland) Jack Beaumont	10 April 2012	17 years, 211 days	8	0	✓	✗
36	(Scotland) Jack Downie	5 May 2012	18 years, 43 days	4	0	✓	✗
37	(Scotland) Danny Mullen	18 August 2012	17 years, 170 days	141	33	✓	✗
38	(Scotland) Ross Gray	9 February 2013	20 years, 141 days	12	0	✓	✗
39	(Scotland) Coll Donaldson	30 March 2013	17 years, 355 days	24	1	✓	✗
40	(Scotland) Kyle Lander	6 April 2013	17 years, 75 days	11	1	✓	✗
41	(Scotland) Shaun Rutherford	3 May 2014	17 years, 212 days	12	0	✓	✗
42	(Scotland) Matthew Knox	26 December 2015	16 years, 4 days	24	1	✓	✗
43	(Scotland) Jack Hamilton	22 July 2017	17 years, 22 days	17	0	✓	✗
44	(Scotland) Carlo Pignatiello	19 September 2020	20 years, 247 days	1	0	✓	✗
45	(Scotland) Sam Culbert	14 January 2025	18 years, 255 days	1	0	✓	✗

== Honours ==
=== Reserve ===
- Reserve League Cup: 1998–99, 2000–01
- Reserve League West: 2000–01
- SPFL Reserve League 2: 2018–19, 2019–20

=== Youth ===
- SFL Under 19 Youth Division: 2007–08, 2008–09, 2009–10, 2010–11
- SFL Under 19 Youth League Cup: 2008–09
- SFL Under 17 Division: 2011–12
- SFL Under 17 Youth League Cup: 2010–11
