= 2013–14 Livingston F.C. season =

Livingston
2013–14 season
- Manager: Richie Burke (until 12 September); John McGlynn
- Stadium: Almondvale Stadium
- Championship: 6th
- League Cup: Third round
- Challenge Cup: First round
- Scottish Cup: Fourth round
- Top goalscorer: League: Marc McNulty (17); All: Marc McNulty (19)
- Highest home attendance: 1,759 vs. Dundee, Championship, 15 March 2014
- Lowest home attendance: 709 vs. Alloa Athletic, Championship, 25 March 2014
- Average home league attendance: 1,161
Home colours	Away colours

The 2013–14 season was Livingston's first season in the new formed Scottish Championship and their third consecutive season in the second-tier of Scottish football, having been promoted from the Scottish Second Division during the 2010–11 season. Livingston also competed in the Challenge Cup, League Cup and the Scottish Cup.

== Summary ==
=== Management ===
Livingston began the 2013–14 season under the management of Richie Burke who had been appointed in February 2013. On the 12 September, Burke resigned from his position as manager following a poor start to the season and was replaced by former Hearts manager John McGlynn.

== Results and fixtures ==
Win Draw Loss Postponed

=== Pre Season ===
4 July 2013	Livingston	0–0	Oțelul	Carden Park Hotel, Chester
16:00		Report

10 July 2013	Livingston	0–2	Rotherham United	Almondvale Stadium, Livingston
19:00		Report	Bradley 7'; Rose 81'

13 July 2013	Livingston	1–2	Wolverhampton Wanderers	Almondvale Stadium, Livingston
19:30	McNulty 12'	Report	Elokobi 35'; Davis 50'	Attendance: 928

16 July 2013	Livingston	0–0	Partick Thistle	Almondvale Stadium, Livingston
15:00		Report

=== Scottish Championship ===
10 August 2013 1	Alloa Athletic	1–0	Livingston	Recreation Park, Alloa
15:00	Simmons 42'	Report	Docherty (red card) 72'	Attendance: 714; Referee: Bobby Madden

17 August 2013 2	Livingston	3–3	Queen of the South	Almondvale Stadium, Livingston
15:00	Denholm 12'; Fordyce 58'; Hastings (red card) 75'; Mullen 80'	Report	Docherty 38'; McGuffie 44' (pen.); Reilly 86'	Attendance: 1,149; Referee: Alan Muir

24 August 2013 3	Livingston	0–3	Falkirk	Almondvale Stadium, Livingston
15:00		Report	Roberts 30', 41', 54'	Attendance: 1,416; Referee: George Salmond

30 August 2013 4	Dundee	3–0	Livingston	Dens Park, Dundee
19:45	Monti 33'; Gallagher 58'; MacDonald 83'	Report		Attendance: 3,955; Referee: Brian Colvin

14 September 2013 5	Livingston	2–2	Greenock Morton	Almondvale Stadium, Livingston
15:00	Mensing 4'; McNulty 14'	Report	Hands 34'; Cham 45'	Attendance: 1,077; Referee: Andrew Dallas

21 September 2013 6	Dumbarton	1–2	Livingston	Dumbarton Football Stadium, Dumbarton
15:00	Megginson 44'	Report	McNulty 49', 76'	Attendance: 759; Referee: Greg Aitken

28 September 2013 7	Livingston	5–1	Cowdenbeath	Almondvale Stadium, Livingston
15:00	Fordyce 42', 60', 87'; Barrowman 72'; Burchill 82'	Report	Hemmings 17'	Attendance: 894; Referee: Craig Charleston

5 October 2013 8	Hamilton Academical	2–0	Livingston	New Douglas Park, Hamilton
15:00	Keatings 33' (pen.), 65'	Report		Attendance: 1,059; Referee: Des Roache

19 October 2013 9	Livingston	3–2	Alloa Athletic	Almondvale Stadium, Livingston
15:00	Scougall 2'; Donaldson 69'; Barrowman 90'	Report	Cawley 8'; Gordon 87'	Attendance: 869; Referee: John McKendrick

26 October 2013 10	Livingston	2–1	Dundee	Almondvale Stadium, Livingston
15:00	Jacobs 55'; Scott 88'	Report	MacDonald 54'	Attendance: 1,597; Referee: Craig Charleston

29 October 2013 11	Raith Rovers	1–0	Livingston	Stark's Park, Kirkcaldy
19:45	Smith 22'	Report	Denholm (red card) 35'	Attendance: 1,304; Referee: Alan Muir

9 November 2013 12	Falkirk	4–1	Livingston	Falkirk Stadium, Falkirk
15:00	Vaulks 37'; Loy 52', 69'; Sibbald 60'	Report	Vaulks 72' (o.g.)	Attendance: 2,878; Referee: Euan Anderson

16 November 2013 13	Livingston	1–3	Dumbarton	Almondvale Stadium, Livingston
15:00	McNulty 20'	Report	Megginson 43'; Turner 52' (pen.); Prunty 74'	Attendance: 1,039; Referee: Stephen Finnie

23 November 2013 14	Greenock Morton	1–5	Livingston	Cappielow, Greenock
15:00	Cham 26' (red card) 87'	Report	McNulty 7', 64' (pen.), 90+2'; Barrowman 28'; Scott 37'	Attendance: 1,460; Referee: Greg Aitken

7 December 2013 15	Cowdenbeath	2–3	Livingston	Central Park, Cowdenbeath
15:00	Hemmings 56', 69'	Report	McNulty 77', 90+2'; Barrowman 87'	Attendance: 363; Referee: Don Robertson

14 December 2013 16	Livingston	0–0	Hamilton Academical	Almondvale Stadium, Livingston
15:00		Report		Attendance: 794; Referee: Mat Northcroft

21 December 2013 17	Queen of the South	2–2	Livingston	Palmerston Park, Dumfries
15:00	Paton 17'; Durnan 45+1'	Report	McNulty 4', 77'	Attendance: 1,523

28 December 2013 18	Livingston	3–0	Raith Rovers	Almondvale Stadium, Livingston
15:00	Thomson 8' (o.g.); Scott 45+1'; Scougall 62'	Report		Attendance: 1,322; Referee: Euan Norris

4 January 2014 19	Livingston	0–1	Falkirk	Almondvale Stadium, Livingston
15:00	Donaldson (red card) 25'	Report	Loy 26' (pen.)	Attendance: 1,585; Referee: Kevin Graham

11 January 2014 20	Dundee	0–1	Livingston	Dens Park, Dundee
15:00		Report	Burchill 11'	Attendance: 4,367; Referee: Steven McLean

18 January 2014 21	Livingston	0–1	Greenock Morton	Almondvale Stadium, Livingston
15:00		Report	McKay 45+1'	Attendance: 1,245; Referee: George Salmond

1 February 2014 22	Livingston	1–2	Queen of the South	Almondvale Stadium, Livingston
15:00	McNulty 40' (pen.)	Report	Durnan 55'; Lyle 79'	Attendance: 1,245; Referee: George Salmond

5 February 2014 23	Dumbarton	2–2	Livingston	Dumbarton Football Stadium, Dumbarton
19:45	Fleming (red card) 50'; Nish 72'; Kane 90+5'	Report	Jacobs 66'; Barrowman 79'	Attendance: 562; Referee: Stevie O’Reilly

15 February 2014 24	Alloa Athletic	0–3	Livingston	Recreation Park, Alloa
15:00		Report	Mensing 20' (red card) 56'; Scott 81'; Jacobs 86'	Attendance: 605; Referee: Iain Brines

21 February 2014 25	Hamilton Academical	2–0	Livingston	New Douglas Park, Hamilton
19:45	Scotland 28'; Antoine-Curier 90+3'	Report		Attendance: 1,063; Referee: Craig Charleston

1 March 2014 26	Livingston	1–0	Cowdenbeath	Almondvale Stadium, Livingston
15:00	Talbot 63'	Report		Attendance: 980; Referee: Andrew Dallas

8 March 2014 27	Falkirk	1–1	Livingston	Falkirk Stadium, Falkirk
15:00	Alston 82'; Roberts (red card) 86'	Report	McNulty 35'	Attendance: 2,924

15 March 2014 28	Livingston	0–2	Dundee	Almondvale Stadium, Livingston
15:00		Report	MacDonald 8'; Benedictus 55'	Attendance: 1,759; Referee: Don Robertson

22 March 2014 29	Raith Rovers	2–4	Livingston	Stark's Park, Kirkcaldy
15:00	Baird 48'; Thomson 85'	Report	Sives 5', 54'; McNulty 50' (pen.), 90+5'	Attendance: 1,329; Referee: Mat Northcroft

25 March 2014 30	Livingston	2–0	Alloa Athletic	Almondvale Stadium, Livingston
19:45	McNulty 21' (pen.); Jacobs 86'	Report		Attendance: 709; Referee: Crawford Allan

29 March 2014 31	Livingston	1–2	Dumbarton	Almondvale Stadium, Livingston
15:00	Mevlja 28'; Talbot (red card) 82'	Report	Turner 86' (pen.); Kane 88'	Attendance: 949; Referee: Greg Aitken

5 April 2014 32	Greenock Morton	2–0	Livingston	Cappielow, Greenock
15:00	Imrie 14'; McKay 45+2'	Report		Attendance: 1,009; Referee: Craig Charleston

12 April 2014 33	Livingston	1–1	Hamilton Academical	Almondvale Stadium, Livingston
15:00	Jacobs 64'	Report	Hendrie (red card) 54'; Scotland 86'	Attendance: 1,133; Referee: Stephen Finnie

19 April 2014 34	Cowdenbeath	4–0	Livingston	Central Park, Cowdenbeath
15:00	Armstrong 45+1', 73'; Hemmings 51', 65'	Report		Attendance: 420; Referee: George Salmond

26 April 2014 35	Queen of the South	2–0	Livingston	Palmerston Park, Dumfries
15:00	McShane 25'; Russell 54'	Report		Attendance: 1,924; Referee: Don Robertson

3 May 2014 36	Livingston	2–0	Raith Rovers	Almondvale Stadium, Livingston
15:00	Mullen 8'; Sives (red card) 15'; McNulty 80'	Report		Attendance: 1,265; Referee: David Somers

=== Scottish Challenge Cup ===
27 July 2013 First Round	Berwick Rangers	3–2 (a.e.t.)	Livingston	Shielfield Park, Berwick-upon-Tweed
15:00	Gray 26'; Morris 99'; Ronald 105+1'	Report	McNulty 90+4'; Mensing 105+2'	Attendance: 460; Referee: George Salmond

=== Scottish League Cup ===
3 August 2013 First Round	Elgin City	1–3	Livingston	Borough Briggs, Elgin
15:00	Crighton 45+2'	Report	Scott 15'; Fordyce 39'; McNulty 63'	Attendance: 563; Referee: Don Robertson

27 August 2013 Second Round	Airdrieonians	0–2	Livingston	Excelsior Stadium, Airdrie
19:45		Report	Barrowman 38'; Wilkie 67'	Attendance: 483; Referee: Greg Aitken

25 September 2013 Third Round	Livingston	1–2	Motherwell	Almondvale Stadium, Livingston
19:45	Talbot (red card) 65'; Denholm 90+1'	Report	McHugh 16'; McFadden 73'	Attendance: 1,660; Referee: Brian Colvin

=== Scottish Cup ===
30 November 2013 Fourth Round	St Johnstone	2–0	Livingston	McDiarmid Park, Perth
19:45	May 24'; Jahic 62'	Report		Attendance: 2,294; Referee: Andrew Dallas

== Player statistics ==
As of 3 May 2014 (UTC)

No.	Pos	Nat	Player	Total		Championship		League Cup		Scottish Cup		Other	
No.	Pos	Nat	Player	Apps	Goals	Apps	Goals	Apps	Goals	Apps	Goals	Apps	Goals
1	GK	(Scotland) SCO	Darren Jamieson	34	0	31+0	0	2+0	0	0+0	0	1+0	0
2	DF	(Belgium) BEL	Mike Mampuya	17	0	14+1	0	1+0	0	0+0	0	1+0	0
3	DF	(Scotland) SCO	Jason Talbot	34	1	27+2	1	3+0	0	1+0	0	1+0	0
4	MF	(England) ENG	Simon Mensing	32	2	27+0	2	3+0	0	1+0	0	1+0	0
5	DF	(Scotland) SCO	Callum Fordyce	40	5	35+0	4	3+0	1	1+0	0	1+0	0
6	MF	(Scotland) SCO	Martin Scott	38	5	26+7	4	3+0	1	1+0	0	1+0	0
7	MF	(South Africa) RSA	Keaghan Jacobs	34	4	28+4	4	1+0	0	1+0	0	0+0	0
8	MF	(Scotland) SCO	Burton O'Brien	32	0	30+0	0	1+0	0	1+0	0	0+0	0
9	FW	(Scotland) SCO	Marc McNulty	39	19	32+3	17	2+0	1	1+0	0	1+0	1
11	MF	(Scotland) SCO	Danny Denholm	31	2	10+17	1	1+2	1	0+1	0	0+0	0
14	DF	(Slovakia) SVK	Michal Habai	7	0	4+3	0	0+0	0	0+0	0	0+0	0
15	MF	(Scotland) SCO	Ross Docherty	11	0	5+3	0	2+0	0	0+0	0	0+1	0
16	MF	(Scotland) SCO	Jack Beaumont	6	0	3+0	0	1+1	0	0+0	0	1+0	0
17	GK	(Scotland) SCO	Kevin Walker	7	0	5+0	0	1+0	0	1+0	0	0+0	0
18	MF	(Scotland) SCO	Kyle Wilkie	23	1	8+12	0	1+1	1	0+0	0	0+1	0
19	DF	(Scotland) SCO	Craig Sives	12	2	11+1	2	0+0	0	0+0	0	0+0	0
20	MF	(Scotland) SCO	Jack Downie	1	0	0+0	0	0+1	0	0+0	0	0+0	0
21	MF	(South Africa) RSA	Kyle Jacobs	13	1	13+0	1	0+0	0	0+0	0	0+0	0
22	FW	(Scotland) SCO	Andrew Barrowman	22	6	16+3	5	1+0	0	2+0	1	0+0	0
23	MF	(Slovenia) SVN	Nejc Mevlja	13	1	12+1	1	0+0	0	0+0	0	0+0	0
27	FW	(Scotland) SCO	Mark Burchill	23	2	6+14	2	0+1	0	0+1	0	1+0	0
31	MF	(Slovenia) SVN	Nejc Praprotnik	5	0	2+3	0	0+0	0	0+0	0	0+0	0
45	DF	(Scotland) SCO	Shaun Rutherford	1	0	0+1	0	0+0	0	0+0	0	0+0	0
48	FW	(Scotland) SCO	Danny Mullen	26	2	8+15	2	0+2	0	0+0	0	0+1	0
49	FW	(Scotland) SCO	Kyle Lander	5	0	0+5	0	0+0	0	0+0	0	0+0	0
Players who left the club during the 2013–14 season
10	MF	(Scotland) SCO	Stefan Scougall	18	2	16+0	2	1+0	0	1+0	0	0+0	0
19	DF	(Scotland) SCO	Coll Donaldson	24	0	19+0	0	3+0	0	1+0	0	1+0	0
21	DF	(Scotland) SCO	Connor McDonald	14	0	8+2	0	2+1	0	0+0	0	1+0	0
23	MF	(Czech Republic) CZE	Patrik Twardzik	2	0	0+1	0	0+0	0	0+1	0	0+0	0

== Team statistics ==
=== League table ===
Pos	Team	Pld	W	D	L	GF	GA	GD	Pts	Promotion, qualification or relegation
4	Queen of the South	36	16	7	13	53	39	+14	55	Qualification for the Premiership play-off quarter-final
5	Dumbarton	36	15	6	15	65	64	+1	51	
6	Livingston	36	13	7	16	51	56	−5	46	
7	Raith Rovers	36	11	9	16	48	61	−13	42	
8	Alloa Athletic	36	11	7	18	34	51	−17	40	

Source: Soccerway
Rules for classification: 1) points; 2) goal difference; 3) number of goals scored.

=== Division summary ===
Round	1	2	3	4	5	6	7	8	9	10	11	12	13	14	15	16	17	18	19	20	21	22	23	24	25	26	27	28	29	30	31	32	33	34	35	36
Ground	A	H	H	A	H	A	H	A	H	H	A	A	H	A	A	H	A	H	H	A	H	H	A	A	A	H	A	H	A	H	H	A	H	H	A	H
Result	L	D	L	L	D	W	W	L	W	W	L	L	L	W	W	D	D	W	L	W	L	L	D	W	L	W	D	L	W	W	L	L	D	L	L	W
Position	8	8	9	10	10	10	8	8	8	7	6	6	8	7	6	7	7	7	7	6	7	7	8	6	7	6	5	6	5	5	5	6	6	6	6	6

Updated to match(es) played on 3 May 2014. Source:
A = Away; H = Home; W = Win; D = Draw; L = Loss

== Transfers ==
=== Players in ===
Player	From	Fee
(England) Simon Mensing	(Scotland) Raith Rovers	Free
(Scotland) Danny Denholm	(Scotland) Forfar Athletic	Free
(Belgium) Mike Mampuya	Free Agent	Free
(Scotland) Martin Scott	(Scotland) Hibernian	Free
(Scotland) Andrew Barrowman	(Scotland) Dundee	Free
(Czech Republic) Patrik Twardzik	(Scotland) Celtic	Loan
(South Africa) Kyle Jacobs	(Scotland) Kilmarnock	Free
(Slovenia) Nejc Mevlja	(Slovenia) NK Maribor	Free
(Egypt) Adam Mansour	(France) Auxerre	Free

=== Players out ===
Player	To	Fee
(Scotland) Jordan Morton	(Scotland) Cowdenbeath	Free
(Scotland) Iain Russell	(Scotland) Queen of the South	Free
(Scotland) Liam Fox	(Scotland) Raith Rovers	Free
(Scotland) Bobby Barr	(Scotland) Brechin City	Free
(Scotland) Andrew McNeil	(New Zealand) WaiBOP United	Free
(Scotland) Craig Barr	(Sweden) Östersunds	Free
(Scotland) Paul Watson	(Scotland) Raith Rovers	Free
(France) Tony Andreu	(Scotland) Hamilton Academical	Free
(South Africa) Kyle Jacobs	(Scotland) Kilmarnock	Free
(Spain) Jesús García Tena	(Scotland) Hamilton Academical	Free
(Scotland) Stefan Scougall	(England) Sheffield United	Undisclosed
(Scotland) Coll Donaldson	(England) Queen's Park Rangers	£150,000

== See also ==
- List of Livingston F.C. seasons
