= 2011–12 Livingston F.C. season =

Livingston
2011–12 season
- Manager: Gary Bollan (until 5 February); Brian Welsh (Caretaker); John Hughes (From 14 February)
- Stadium: Almondvale Stadium
- First Division: 5th
- Challenge Cup: Semi-final
- League Cup: Second round
- Scottish Cup: Fourth round
- Top goalscorer: League: Marc McNulty (11); All: Marc McNulty (16)
- Highest home attendance: 2,967 vs. Falkirk, First Division, 2 January 2012
- Lowest home attendance: 549 vs. Stirling Albion, Challenge Cup, 9 August 2011
- Average home league attendance: 1,776
| Home colours | Away colours |

The 2011–12 season saw Livingston compete in their first season back in the First Division, having been promoted after winning the Scottish Second Division during season 2010–11. They also competed in the Challenge Cup, League Cup and the Scottish Cup.

== Summary ==
Livingston finished fifth in the First Division. They reached the Semi Final of the Challenge Cup, the second round of the League Cup and the fourth round of the Scottish Cup.

=== Managers ===
On 5 February 2012 Gary Bollan was sacked by the club, with Brian Welsh being appointed as caretaker manager. Welsh led the club for one game before emigrating to America and on 14 February John Hughes was appointed as manager with John Collins being appointed Director of football.

== Results and fixtures ==
Win Draw Loss Postponed

=== Preseason ===
| 2 July 2011 Friendly | Livingston | 1–1 | Dunfermline | Braidwood Motor Company Stadium |
| | Russell 9' | DAFC Report | Hardie 5' | Attendance: 657; Referee: Tumilty |

| 5 July 2011 Friendly | Livingston | 2–1 | Hibernian | Braidwood Motor Company Stadium |
| | Deuchar 1'; Russell 28' | Hibernian FC Report | O'Connor 53' | Attendance: 2,213; Referee: Collum |

| 9 July 2011 Friendly | Livingston | 1–1 | Inverness | Braidwood Motor Company Stadium |
| | Ky. Jacobs | Livingston Report | Foran | Attendance: 507; Referee: Steve Conroy |

| 13 July 2011 Friendly | Cove Rangers | 0–4 | Livingston | Albyn School |
| | | Livingston Report | Cummings; Barr; Fox; Easton |

| 16 July 2011 Friendly | Livingston | 1–0 | Hearts | Braidwood Motor Company Stadium |
| | Russell 33' | Livingston Report | | Attendance: 976; Referee: Beaton |

=== Scottish First Division ===
| 6 August 2011 First Division | Livingston | 2–2 | Queen of the South | Braidwood Motor Company Stadium |
| | Sinclair 56'; Russell 85' (pen.) | BBC Sport | McLaughlin 19'; Brighton 32' | Attendance: 1,444; Referee: Norris |

| 13 August 2011 First Division | Greenock Morton | 2–1 | Livingston | Cappielow |
| | Tidser 9'; MacDonald 64' (pen.); McCaffrey (yellow card) 87' (red card) | BBC Sport | Russell 55' (pen.) | Attendance: 2,025; Referee: Winter |

| 20 August 2011 First Division | Livingston | 4–2 | Dundee | Braidwood Motor Company Stadium |
| | Russell 4'; Deuchar 13', 59'; Ke. Jacobs 90' | BBC Sport | Irvine 61'; McNeil 65' (o.g.) | Attendance: 1,996; Referee: Hilland |

| 27 August 2011 First Division | Hamilton Academical | 1–1 | Livingston | New Douglas Park |
| | McLaughlin (red card) 54'; Mensing (yellow card) 64' (red card); Crawford 78' | BBC Sport | Boulding 90' | Attendance: 2,051; Referee: Charleston |

| 10 September 2011 First Division | Livingston | 1–1 | Falkirk | Braidwood Motor Company Stadium |
| | Russell 70' | BBC Sport | Murdoch (red card) 38'; Millar 90' (pen.); Higginbotham (red card) 90' | Attendance: 2,229; Referee: Thomson |

| 17 September 2011 First Division | Ross County | 1–1 | Livingston | Victoria Park |
| | Brittain 45'; Craig (red card) 64' | BBC Sport | Sinclair 40'; Watson (yellow card) 65' (red card) | Attendance: 2,047; Referee: Northcroft |

| 24 September 2011 First Division | Livingston | 2–1 | Partick Thistle | Braidwood Motor Company Stadium |
| | Deuchar 29'; Ky. Jacobs 90' | BBC Sport | Elliot 51' | Attendance: 2,251; Referee: Salmond |

| 1 October 2011 First Division | Livingston | 1–1 | Raith Rovers | Braidwood Motor Company Stadium |
| 15:00 | McNulty 67' | BBC Report | Hill (red card) 18'; Graham 60' | Attendance: 2,011; Referee: Collum |

| 15 October 2011 First Division | Ayr United | 0–0 | Livingston | Somerset Park |
| | | Livingston Report | | Attendance: 1,390; Referee: McLean |

| 22 October 2011 First Division | Livingston | 1–1 | Greenock Morton | Braidwood Motor Company Stadium |
| 15:00 | Russell 34' (pen.) | SFL Report | O'Brien 16' | Attendance: 1,740; Referee: Clancy |

| 29 October 2011 First Division | Queen of the South | 0–2 | Livingston | Somerset Park |
| | | Livingston Report | McNulty 6'; Fotheringham 64' | Attendance: 1,556; Referee: Winter |

| 5 November 2011 First Division | Falkirk | 4–3 | Livingston | Falkirk Stadium |
| 15:00 | Alagui 12'; Wallace 17'; Brown 39' (o.g.); Weatherston 85' | SFL Report | Barr 56'; Ke. Jacobs 62'; Fotheringham 78' | Attendance: 3,691; Referee: Colvin |

| 12 November 2011 First Division | Livingston | 1–0 | Hamilton Academical | Braidwood Motor Company Stadium |
| 15:00 | McNulty 52' | BBC Sport | | Attendance: 1,738; Referee: McKendrick |

| 26 November 2011 First Division | Livingston | 0–3 | Ross County | Braidwood Motor Company Stadium |
| 15:00 | Boulding (red card) 56' | SFL Report | Gardyne 65'; McMenamin 72', 74' | Attendance: 1,628; Referee: Tumilty |

| 3 December 2011 First Division | Partick Thistle | 2–1 | Livingston | Firhill Stadium |
| 15:00 | Balatoni 26'; Deuchar 33' (o.g.) | SFL Report | Deuchar 56' | Attendance: 2,026; Referee: Muir |

| 10 December 2011 First Division | Raith Rovers | 0–1 | Livingston | Stark's Park |
| 15:00 | | BBC Sport | Barr 56' | Attendance: 1,604; Referee: Allan |

| 17 December 2011 First Division | Livingston | P–P | Ayr United | Braidwood Motor Company Stadium |
| 15:00 |

| 26 December 2011 First Division | Hamilton Academical | 0–1 | Livingston | New Douglas Park |
| 14:00 | | SFL Report | Barr 70' | Attendance: 1,546; Referee: Charleston |

| 2 January 2012 First Division | Livingston | 1–2 | Falkirk | Braidwood Motor Company Stadium |
| 15:00 | McNulty 66' | SFL Report | Alagui 12'; Higginbotham 72' | Attendance: 2,967; Referee: Winter |

| 14 January 2012 First Division | Dundee | 3–0 | Livingston | Dens Park |
| 15:00 | Conroy 19'; McGregor 74'; Riley 82' | BBC Report | Fotheringham (yellow card) 76' (yellow-red card) | Attendance: 4,176; Referee: Charleston |

| 21 January 2012 First Division | Livingston | 2–2 | Queen of the South | Braidwood Motor Company Stadium |
| 15:00 | Fox 40'; Scougall 73' | BBC Report | Brighton 16'; McGuffie 81' (pen.); C. Reid (yellow card) 90' (yellow-red card) | Attendance: 1,286; Referee: Somers |

| 28 January 2012 First Division | Ross County | 3–0 | Livingston | Victoria Park |
| 15:00 | McMenamin 28', 82'; Morrow 87' | SFL Report | | Attendance: 2,514; Referee: McKendrick |

| 11 February 2012 First Division | Livingston | 3–1 | Partick Thistle | Braidwood Motor Company Stadium |
| 15:00 | McNulty 37'; Watson 45'; Ky. Jacobs 52' | SFL Report | Cairney 88' | Attendance: 1,824; Referee: Conroy |

| 18 February 2012 First Division | Livingston | 4–0 | Raith Rovers | Braidwood Motor Company Stadium |
| 15:00 | Ky. Jacobs 17'; McNulty 48', 60', 70' (pen.) | SFL Report | Davidson (red card) 69' | Attendance: 1,929; Referee: Colvin |

| 25 February 2012 First Division | Ayr United | 3–1 | Livingston | Somerset Park |
| 15:00 | Geggan 33', 56'; Malone 53' | SFL Report | Cummings 11' | Attendance: 1,312; Referee: Thomson |

| 3 March 2012 First Division | Livingston | 2–3 | Dundee | Braidwood Motor Company Stadium |
| 15:00 | McNulty 39'; McGregor 46' (o.g.) | SFL Report | McCluskey 26', 88'; Finnigan 56' | Attendance: 2,052; Referee: Madden |

| 6 March 2012 First Division | Livingston | 1–2 | Ayr United | Braidwood Motor Company Stadium |
| 19:45 | Ke. Jacobs 12' | SFL Report | Roberts 20' (pen.); McGowan 66' | Attendance: 859; Referee: Finnie |

| 10 March 2012 First Division | Greenock Morton | 1–3 | Livingston | Cappielow Park |
| 15:00 | MacDonald 22' | SFL Report | McNulty 5'; Russell 41'; Barr 51' | Attendance: 1,396; Referee: Richmond |

| 16 March 2012 First Division | Livingston | P–P | Hamilton Academical | Braidwood Motor Company Stadium |
| 19:45 | | Report | | Referee: O'Reilly |

| 17 March 2012 First Division | Livingston | 0–4 | Hamilton Academical | Braidwood Motor Company Stadium |
| 15:00 | Talbot (red card) 11' | SFL Report | McShane 3'; Redmond 12'; Routledge 28', 81' | Attendance: 1,066; Referee: O'Reilly |

| 24 March 2012 First Division | Falkirk | 2–5 | Livingston | Falkirk Stadium |
| 15:00 | El Alagui 29'; Weatherston 79' | SFL Report | Boulding 36', 41'; B. Barr 71', 84'; Russell 74' (pen.) | Attendance: 2,939; Referee: Somers |

| 31 March 2012 First Division | Partick Thistle | 2–3 | Livingston | Firhill Stadium |
| 15:00 | Cairney 7'; Sinclair 54' | SFL Report | Boulding 20', 47'; Russell 50' | Attendance: 1,871; Referee: Charleston |

| 7 April 2012 First Division | Livingston | 1–3 | Ross County | Braidwood Motor Company Stadium |
| 15:00 | Boulding 46' | SFL Report | McMenamin 38', 69'; Vigurs 86' | Attendance: 2,004; Referee: Richmond |

| 10 April 2012 First Division | Raith Rovers | 0–3 | Livingston | Stark's Park |
| 19:45 | | SFL Report | Boulding 17' (pen.), 45', 55' | Attendance: 1,541; Referee: Brines |

| 14 April 2012 First Division | Livingston | 0–1 | Ayr United | Braidwood Motor Company Stadium |
| 15:00 | | SFL Report | Roberts 24' | Attendance: 1,375; Referee: Winter |

| 21 April 2012 First Division | Queen of the South | 0–4 | Livingston | Somerset Park |
| 15:00 | Higgins (red card) 35' | SFL Report | Boulding 27', 88'; McNulty 38'; Jacobs 72' | Attendance: 1,403; Referee: Muir |

| 28 April 2012 First Division | Livingston | 0–0 | Greenock Morton | Braidwood Motor Company Stadium |
| 15:00 | | SFL Report | | Attendance: 1,571; Referee: Roache |

| 5 May 2012 First Division | Dundee | 0–1 | Livingston | Dens Park |
| 15:00 | Reid 48' | SFL Report | | Attendance: 3,675; Referee: Finnie |

=== Scottish Challenge Cup ===
| 23 July 2011 Scottish Challenge Cup round 1 | Airdrie United | 0–5 | Livingston | Excelsior Stadium |
| | | BBC Sport | Sinclair 50'; Russell 55', 67'; Barr 82', 90' | Attendance: 719; Referee: Richmond |

| 9 August 2011 Scottish Challenge Cup round 2 | Livingston | 5–0 | Stirling Albion | Braidwood Motor Company Stadium |
| | Deuchar 23', 34', 90'; Jacobs 36' (o.g.); Thom 87' (o.g.) | BBC Sport | | Attendance: 549; Referee: Brines |

| 4 September 2011 Scottish Challenge Cup QF | Berwick Rangers | 1–2 | Livingston | Shielfield Park |
| | McDonald 52' | BBC Sport | Scougall 12'; Russell 85' | Attendance: 567; Referee: Beaton |

| 9 October 2011 Scottish Challenge Cup SF | Hamilton Academical | 1–0 | Livingston | New Douglas Park |
| 15:00 | McLaughlin 43' | BBC Sport | | Attendance: 1,418; Referee: Richmond |

=== Scottish League Cup ===
| 30 July 2011 Scottish League Cup round 1 | Livingston | 6–0 | Arbroath | Braidwood Motor Company Stadium |
| | Boulding 2'; Russell 7', 22'; Ke. Jacobs 33'; Talbot 66'; McNulty 72' | BBC Sport | Doris (red card) 76' | Attendance: 804; Referee: Allan |

| 24 August 2011 Scottish League Cup round 2 | St Johnstone | 3–0 | Livingston | McDiarmid Park |
| | Wright 13'; Sandaza 18', 25' | BBC Sport | | Attendance: 2,439; Referee: Conroy |

=== Scottish Cup ===
| 19 November 2011 Scottish Cup round 3 | Irvine Meadow | 0–6 | Livingston | Meadow Park |
| 14:00 | | BBC Sport | McNulty 5', 26', 40'; Boulding 41'; Deuchar 51'; Barr 90' | Attendance: 1,500; Referee: Cook |

| 7 January 2012 Scottish Cup round 4 | Livingston | 1–2 | Ayr United | Braidwood Motor Company Stadium |
| 15:15 | McNulty 43' | BBC Sport | Geggan 39'; McGowan 52' | Attendance: 932; Referee: Salmond |

== Player statistics ==
=== Captains ===
| No. | P | Name | Country | No. games | Notes |
|---|---|---|---|---|---|
| | MF | Liam Fox | (Scotland) | 29 | Club captain |

Last updated: 5 May 2012
Source: Competitive match reports.
Competitive matches only
Matches started as captain only
Country: FIFA nationality; No.: Squad number; P: Position; Name: Player name; No. Games: Number of games started as captain.

=== Squad ===
Last updated 5 May 2012

| No. | Pos | Nat | Player | Total | | First Division | | Scottish Cup | | League Cup | | Ramsdens Challenge Cup | |
| No. | Pos | Nat | Player | Apps | Goals | Apps | Goals | Apps | Goals | Apps | Goals | Apps | Goals |
|---|---|---|---|---|---|---|---|---|---|---|---|---|---|
| | GK | (Scotland) SCO | Darren Jamieson | 1 | 0 | 0+0 | 0 | 0+0 | 0 | 0+0 | 0 | 1+0 | 0 |
| | GK | (Scotland) SCO | Andrew McNeil | 43 | 0 | 36+0 | 0 | 2+0 | 0 | 2+0 | 0 | 3+0 | 0 |
| | GK | (England) ENG | Tony Bullock | 0 | 0 | 0+0 | 0 | 0+0 | 0 | 0+0 | 0 | 0+0 | 0 |
| | GK | (Scotland) SCO | Andrew Murphy | 0 | 0 | 0+0 | 0 | 0+0 | 0 | 0+0 | 0 | 0+0 | 0 |
| | DF | (Scotland) SCO | Craig Barr | 42 | 2 | 35+0 | 2 | 2+0 | 0 | 2+0 | 0 | 3+0 | 0 |
| | DF | (Scotland) SCO | Cameron MacDonald | 3 | 0 | 1+0 | 0 | 0+0 | 0 | 0+0 | 0 | 2+0 | 0 |
| | DF | (Scotland) SCO | Callum Fordyce | 11 | 0 | 8+2 | 0 | 1+0 | 0 | 0+0 | 0 | 0+0 | 0 |
| | DF | (Scotland) SCO | Jonathan Brown | 15 | 0 | 8+2 | 0 | 0+0 | 0 | 2+0 | 0 | 3+0 | 0 |
| | DF | (England) ENG | Jason Talbot | 31 | 1 | 25+0 | 0 | 1+0 | 0 | 2+0 | 1 | 3+0 | 0 |
| | DF | (Scotland) SCO | Paul Watson | 40 | 1 | 32+0 | 1 | 2+0 | 0 | 2+0 | 0 | 4+0 | 0 |
| | DF | (Scotland) SCO | Ross Docherty | 13 | 0 | 8+3 | 0 | 0+0 | 0 | 0+0 | 0 | 0+2 | 0 |
| | DF | (Scotland) SCO | Michael Travis | 3 | 0 | 0+1 | 0 | 0+0 | 0 | 0+0 | 0 | 0+2 | 0 |
| | DF | (Scotland) SCO | Maurice Ross | 8 | 0 | 8+0 | 0 | 0+0 | 0 | 0+0 | 0 | 0+0 | 0 |
| | DF | (Scotland) SCO | Bryce Naples | 0 | 0 | 0+0 | 0 | 0+0 | 0 | 0+0 | 0 | 0+0 | 0 |
| | DF | (Scotland) SCO | Kevin McCann | 10 | 0 | 10+0 | 0 | 0+0 | 0 | 0+0 | 0 | 0+0 | 0 |
| | MF | (Scotland) SCO | David Sinclair | 19 | 3 | 6+8 | 2 | 0+0 | 0 | 1+0 | 0 | 4+0 | 1 |
| | MF | (Scotland) SCO | Liam Fox | 29 | 1 | 21+1 | 1 | 0+2 | 0 | 2+0 | 0 | 2+1 | 0 |
| | MF | (South Africa) RSA | Keaghan Jacobs | 38 | 5 | 30+1 | 4 | 2+0 | 0 | 2+0 | 1 | 3+0 | 0 |
| | MF | (South Africa) RSA | Kyle Jacobs | 40 | 3 | 29+5 | 3 | 2+0 | 0 | 1+1 | 0 | 2+0 | 0 |
| | MF | (Scotland) SCO | Dean Cummings | 10 | 1 | 5+5 | 1 | 0+0 | 0 | 0+0 | 0 | 0+0 | 0 |
| | MF | (Scotland) SCO | Ross Gray | 1 | 0 | 0+0 | 0 | 0+0 | 0 | 0+0 | 0 | 0+1 | 0 |
| | MF | (Scotland) SCO | Bobby Barr | 43 | 7 | 35+1 | 4 | 2+0 | 1 | 1+1 | 0 | 3+0 | 2 |
| | MF | (Scotland) SCO | Stefan Scougall | 30 | 2 | 20+4 | 1 | 1+1 | 0 | 1+0 | 0 | 3+0 | 1 |
| | MF | (Scotland) SCO | Lewis Turner | 0 | 0 | 0+0 | 0 | 0+0 | 0 | 0+0 | 0 | 0+0 | 0 |
| | MF | (Scotland) SCO | Mark Fotheringham | 13 | 2 | 11+0 | 2 | 2+0 | 0 | 0+0 | 0 | 0+0 | 0 |
| | MF | (Scotland) SCO | Connor McDonald | 3 | 0 | 0+3 | 0 | 0+0 | 0 | 0+0 | 0 | 0+0 | 0 |
| | MF | (Scotland) SCO | Jack Beaumont | 2 | 0 | 0+2 | 0 | 0+0 | 0 | 0+0 | 0 | 0+0 | 0 |
| | MF | (Scotland) SCO | Jack Downie | 1 | 0 | 0+1 | 0 | 0+0 | 0 | 0+0 | 0 | 0+0 | 0 |
| | FW | (Scotland) SCO | Kenny Deuchar | 27 | 8 | 14+6 | 4 | 1+0 | 1 | 1+1 | 0 | 3+1 | 3 |
| | FW | (Scotland) SCO | Marc McNulty | 37 | 16 | 25+5 | 11 | 2+0 | 4 | 0+2 | 1 | 0+3 | 0 |
| | FW | (Scotland) SCO | Iain Russell | 33 | 13 | 17+9 | 8 | 1+1 | 0 | 2+0 | 2 | 3+0 | 3 |
| | FW | (England) ENG | Rory Boulding | 32 | 13 | 12+13 | 11 | 1+1 | 1 | 1+1 | 1 | 2+1 | 0 |
| | FW | (Scotland) SCO | Andrew Russell | 9 | 0 | 1+8 | 0 | 0+0 | 0 | 0+0 | 0 | 0+0 | 0 |
| | FW | (Scotland) SCO | Dylan Easton | 2 | 0 | 0+2 | 0 | 0+0 | 0 | 0+0 | 0 | 0+0 | 0 |
| | FW | (Scotland) SCO | Michael Scott | 1 | 0 | 1+0 | 0 | 0+0 | 0 | 0+0 | 0 | 0+0 | 0 |
| | FW | (Scotland) SCO | Liam Gray | 2 | 0 | 0+2 | 0 | 0+0 | 0 | 0+0 | 0 | 0+0 | 0 |

=== Disciplinary record ===
Includes all competitive matches.

Last updated 5 May 2012

| Nation | Position | Name | Scottish First Division | | Scottish Cup | | League Cup | | Challenge Cup | | Total | |
| Nation | Position | Name | Booked | Sent off (straight red) | Booked | Sent off (straight red) | Booked | Sent off (straight red) | Booked | Sent off (straight red) | Booked | Sent off (straight red) |
| (England) | GK | Tony Bullock | 0 | 0 | 0 | 0 | 0 | 0 | 0 | 0 | 0 | 0 |
| (Scotland) | GK | Darren Jamieson | 0 | 0 | 0 | 0 | 0 | 0 | 0 | 0 | 0 | 0 |
| (Scotland) | GK | Andrew McNeil | 0 | 0 | 0 | 0 | 0 | 0 | 0 | 0 | 0 | 0 |
| (Scotland) | DF | Craig Barr | 7 | 0 | 1 | 0 | 0 | 0 | 2 | 0 | 10 | 0 |
| (Scotland) | DF | Cameron MacDonald | 0 | 0 | 0 | 0 | 0 | 0 | 1 | 0 | 1 | 0 |
| (Scotland) | DF | Callum Fordyce | 1 | 0 | 0 | 0 | 0 | 0 | 0 | 0 | 1 | 0 |
| (Scotland) | DF | Jonathan Brown | 2 | 0 | 0 | 0 | 0 | 0 | 0 | 0 | 2 | 0 |
| (England) | DF | Jason Talbot | 1 | 1 | 0 | 0 | 0 | 0 | 1 | 0 | 2 | 1 |
| (Scotland) | DF | Paul Watson | 6 | 1 | 0 | 0 | 1 | 0 | 0 | 0 | 7 | 1 |
| (Scotland) | DF | Ross Docherty | 1 | 0 | 0 | 0 | 0 | 0 | 0 | 0 | 1 | 0 |
| (Scotland) | DF | Michael Travis | 0 | 0 | 0 | 0 | 0 | 0 | 0 | 0 | 0 | 0 |
| (Scotland) | DF | Maurice Ross | 2 | 0 | 0 | 0 | 0 | 0 | 0 | 0 | 2 | 0 |
| (Scotland) | DF | Bryce Naples | 0 | 0 | 0 | 0 | 0 | 0 | 0 | 0 | 0 | 0 |
| (Scotland) | DF | Kevin McCann | 0 | 0 | 0 | 0 | 0 | 0 | 0 | 0 | 0 | 0 |
| (Scotland) | MF | David Sinclair | 0 | 0 | 0 | 0 | 0 | 0 | 0 | 0 | 0 | 0 |
| (Scotland) | MF | Liam Fox | 2 | 0 | 1 | 0 | 1 | 0 | 0 | 0 | 4 | 0 |
| (South Africa) | MF | Keaghan Jacobs | 3 | 0 | 0 | 0 | 0 | 0 | 0 | 0 | 3 | 0 |
| (South Africa) | MF | Kyle Jacobs | 3 | 0 | 0 | 0 | 0 | 0 | 0 | 0 | 3 | 0 |
| (Scotland) | MF | Dean Cummings | 0 | 0 | 0 | 0 | 0 | 0 | 0 | 0 | 0 | 0 |
| (Scotland) | MF | Ross Gray | 0 | 0 | 0 | 0 | 0 | 0 | 0 | 0 | 0 | 0 |
| (Scotland) | MF | Bobby Barr | 4 | 0 | 1 | 0 | 0 | 0 | 0 | 0 | 5 | 0 |
| (Scotland) | MF | Stefan Scougall | 0 | 0 | 0 | 0 | 0 | 0 | 1 | 0 | 1 | 0 |
| (Scotland) | MF | Lewis Turner | 0 | 0 | 0 | 0 | 0 | 0 | 0 | 0 | 0 | 0 |
| (Scotland) | MF | Mark Fotheringham | 6 | 1 | 0 | 0 | 0 | 0 | 0 | 0 | 6 | 1 |
| (Scotland) | MF | Connor McDonald | 0 | 0 | 0 | 0 | 0 | 0 | 0 | 0 | 0 | 0 |
| (Scotland) | MF | Jack Beaumont | 0 | 0 | 0 | 0 | 0 | 0 | 0 | 0 | 0 | 0 |
| (Scotland) | MF | Jack Downie | 0 | 0 | 0 | 0 | 0 | 0 | 0 | 0 | 0 | 0 |
| (Scotland) | FW | Kenny Deuchar | 2 | 0 | 0 | 0 | 0 | 0 | 0 | 0 | 2 | 0 |
| (Scotland) | FW | Marc McNulty | 3 | 0 | 0 | 0 | 0 | 0 | 1 | 0 | 4 | 0 |
| (Scotland) | FW | Iain Russell | 3 | 0 | 0 | 0 | 0 | 0 | 1 | 0 | 4 | 0 |
| (England) | FW | Rory Boulding | 1 | 1 | 0 | 0 | 0 | 0 | 0 | 0 | 1 | 1 |
| (Scotland) | FW | Andrew Russell | 1 | 0 | 0 | 0 | 0 | 0 | 0 | 0 | 1 | 0 |
| (Scotland) | FW | Dylan Easton | 0 | 0 | 0 | 0 | 0 | 0 | 0 | 0 | 0 | 0 |
| (Scotland) | FW | Michael Scott | 0 | 0 | 0 | 0 | 0 | 0 | 0 | 0 | 0 | 0 |
| (Scotland) | FW | Liam Gray | 1 | 0 | 0 | 0 | 0 | 0 | 0 | 0 | 1 | 0 |

=== Awards ===
Last updated 14 May 2012

| Nation | Name | Award | Month |
|---|---|---|---|
| (England) | Rory Boulding | Ginger Boot Winner | April |

== Team statistics ==
=== League table ===
| Pos | Team | Pld | W | D | L | GF | GA | GD | Pts |
|---|---|---|---|---|---|---|---|---|---|
| 3 | Falkirk | 36 | 13 | 13 | 10 | 53 | 48 | +5 | 52 |
| 4 | Hamilton Academical | 36 | 14 | 7 | 15 | 55 | 56 | −1 | 49 |
| 5 | Livingston | 36 | 13 | 9 | 14 | 56 | 54 | +2 | 48 |
| 6 | Partick Thistle | 36 | 12 | 11 | 13 | 50 | 39 | +11 | 47 |
| 7 | Raith Rovers | 36 | 11 | 11 | 14 | 46 | 49 | −3 | 44 |

Source: SPFL Archive
Rules for classification: 1) points; 2) goal difference; 3) number of goals scored.

== Transfers ==
=== Players in ===
| Player | From | Fee |
|---|---|---|
| (Scotland) Jonathan Brown | (Scotland) Heart of Midlothian | Free |
| (England) Rory Boulding | (England) Accrington Stanley | Free |
| (Scotland) Andrew McNeil | (Scotland) Raith Rovers | Free |
| (Scotland) Maurice Ross | (Scotland) Motherwell | Free |
| (Scotland) Mark Fotheringham | (Cyprus) Anorthosis Famagusta | Free |
| (Scotland) Kevin McCann | (Scotland) Greenock Morton | Free |

=== Players out ===
| Player | To | Fee |
|---|---|---|
| (Scotland) Joe Hamill | (Scotland) Raith Rovers | Free |
| (Italy) Raffaele De Vita | (England) Swindon Town | Free |
| (Scotland) Christopher Malone | (Scotland) Airdrie United | Free |
| (South Africa) Devon Jacobs | (Scotland) Stirling Albion | Free |
| (Scotland) Aaron Conway | (Scotland) Peterhead | Free |
| (Scotland) Craig McDowall | (Scotland) Alloa Athletic | Free |
| (Scotland) Michael O'Byrne | (Scotland) Albion Rovers | Free |
| (Scotland) Lewis Turner | Free agent | Free |
| (England) Tony Bullock | | Retired |
| (Scotland) Ross Gray | (Scotland) Berwick Rangers | Loan |
| (Scotland) Cameron MacDonald | (Scotland) Airdrie United | Free |
| (Scotland) Maurice Ross | Free agent | Free |
| (Scotland) Mark Fotheringham | (Scotland) Dundee | Free |
| (Scotland) Kenny Deuchar | (Scotland) Stenhousemuir | Loan |
