= 2010–11 Livingston F.C. season =

Livingston
2010–11 season
- Chairman: Gordon McDougall
- Manager: Gary Bollan
- Stadium: Braidwood Motor Company Stadium
- Second Division: 1st (promoted)
- Challenge Cup: First round, lost to Queen's Park
- League Cup: First round, lost to Ross County
- Scottish Cup: Third round, lost to Elgin City
- Top goalscorer: League: Iain Russell (22); All: Iain Russell (24)
- Highest home attendance: 1,863 vs. Airdrie United, 21 August 2010
- Lowest home attendance: 724 vs. Forfar Athletic, 1 March 2011
- Average home league attendance: 1,303

The 2010–11 season was Livingston's first season back in the Second Division, having been promoted after winning the Third Division during season 2009–10. They also competed in the Challenge Cup, League Cup and the Scottish Cup.

== Overview ==
The 2010–11 season was Livingston's first season back in the Scottish Second Division having been promoted as champions from the Third Division. Despite poor form in the cups being knocked out in all their opening rounds, they won the Second Division with 5 games to spare with a 3–0 win over Stenhousemuir. After all games were completed they were 23 points ahead over nearest rival Ayr United.

== Results and fixtures ==
Win Draw Loss

10 July 2010 Friendly	Spartans	1–4	Livingston	Ainslie Park
15:00	King	Liv Report	Russell; Russell; Jacobs; Chris Malone

13 July 2010 Friendly	Montrose	0–3	Livingston	Links Park
19:45		Liv Report	Barr; Winters; McNulty

15 July 2010 Friendly	Bangor	0–4	Livingston	Clandeboye Park
19:45		Liv Report	Jacobs; Hamill; McNulty; Barr

17 July 2010 Friendly	Glentoran	1–1	Livingston	The Oval
15:00	Waterworth	Liv Report	Winters

20 July 2010 Friendly	Livingston	0–0	Oxford United	Braidwood Motor Company Stadium
19:30

28 July 2010 Friendly	Livingston	2–2	Dundee United	Braidwood Motor Company Stadium
19:30	McNulty; Malone	Liv Report	Casalinuovo; Myrie-Williams

18 December 2010 Friendly	Spartans Juniors	0–3	Livingston	Ainslie Park
15:00

=== Scottish Second Division ===
7 August 2010	Livingston	3–3	Alloa Athletic	Braidwood Motor Company Stadium
15:00	Jacobs 2'; Russell 21'; McAvoy 64' (o.g.)	BBC Report	Smith; Punty 57'; Scott 90' (pen.)	Attendance: 1,389; Referee: McDermott

14 August 2010	Dumbarton	1–2	Livingston	Strathclyde Homes Stadium
15:00	Chaplain 70' (pen.)	BBC Report	Winters 25' (pen.); O'Byrne (yellow card) 71' (red card); Russell 77'	Attendance: 643; Referee: Watters

21 August 2010	Livingston	2–1	Airdrie United	Braidwood Motor Company Stadium
15:00	Russell 24'; De Vita 73'	BBC Report	Gemmill 5'	Attendance: 1,863; Referee: Colvin

28 August 2010	Livingston	2–0	Forfar Athletic	Braidwood Motor Company Stadium
15:00	Winters 24'; Jacobs 68'	BBC Report		Attendance: 1,553; Referee: Northcroft

11 September 2010	Peterhead	0–0	Livingston	Balmoor Stadium
15:00		BBC Report		Attendance: 431; Referee: Beaton

18 September 2010	Brechin City	1–3	Livingston	Glebe Park
15:00	Moyes 90'	BBC Report	Russell 43'; Barr 45'; De Vita 74'	Attendance: 526; Referee: Smith

25 September 2010	Livingston	1–1	East Fife	Braidwood Motor Company Stadium
15:00	De Vita 53'	BBC Report	Byrne 69'	Attendance: 1,769; Referee: Brines

2 October 2010	Ayr United	3–1	Livingston	Somerset Park
15:00	Malone 75'; Roberts 80', 82'	BBC Report	Fox 33'	Attendance: 1,270; Referee: Winter

16 October 2010	Livingston	4–1	Stenhousemuir	Braidwood Motor Company Stadium
15:00	Winters 14'; Scullion 23' (o.g.); Conway 24'; Russell 40'	BBC Report	Lyle 28'	Attendance: 1,606; Referee: Conroy

23 October 2010	Livingston	1–0	Peterhead	Braidwood Motor Company Stadium
15:00	Winters 62'	BBC Report		Attendance: 1,295; Referee: McDermott

30 October 2010	Forfar Athletic	1–0	Livingston	Station Park
15:00	Allan 72'	BBC Report		Attendance: 612; Referee: McLean

6 November 2010	Livingston	2–0	Dumbarton	Braidwood Motor Company Stadium
15:00	Watson 19'; Russell 87'	BBC Report		Attendance: 1,417; Referee: Clancy

13 November 2010	Airdrie United	0–1	Livingston	Excelsior Stadium
15:00		BBC Report	Russell 64'	Attendance: 1,013; Referee: Beaton

26 December 2010	Alloa Athletic	2–2	Livingston	Recreation Park
15:00	Noble 28'; Dunlop 45'	BBC Report	Sinclair 59'; De Vita 71'	Attendance: 566; Referee: Hilland

15 January 2011	Peterhead	3–0	Livingston	Balmoor Stadium
15:00	Ross 26'; Strachan 50', 71' (pen.)	BBC Report	Winters (yellow card) 66' (red card)	Attendance: 585; Referee: Robertson

18 January 2011	East Fife	2–4	Livingston	Bayview Stadium
19:45	Crawford 19'; Sloan 61' (pen.)	BBC Report	Deuchar 57', 65', 87'; O'Byrne (red card) 80'; Russell 82'	Attendance: 548; Referee: Beaton

29 January 2011	Livingston	4–3	East Fife	Braidwood Motor Company Stadium
15:00	Jacobs 1', 89'; Fox 12'; Barr 82'	BBC Report	Linn 28'; Crawford 72'; Muir 75'	Attendance: 1,340; Referee: Salmond

1 February 2011	Livingston	2–0	Brechin City	Braidwood Motor Company Stadium
19:45	Russell 25'; Winters 89'	BBC Report		Attendance: 847; Referee: Richmond

12 February 2011	Ayr United	0–3	Livingston	Somerset Park
15:00		BBC Report	Barr 61'; Deuchar 73'; Fox 84'	Attendance: 1,614; Referee: Brines

15 February 2011	Livingston	2–0	Airdrie United	Braidwood Motor Company Stadium
19:45	Russell 34', 70' (pen.)	BBC Report		Attendance: 890; Referee: Watters

19 February 2011	Livingston	2–1	Stenhousemuir	Braidwood Motor Company Stadium
15:00	Russell 34'; Barr 40'; Talbot (red card) 60'	BBC Report	Williams 64'	Attendance: 1,246; Referee: Alan Muir

22 February 2011	Brechin City	1–0	Livingston	Glebe Park
19:45	Molloy	Liv Report		Attendance: 565; Referee: Law

26 February 2011	Livingston	4–0	Alloa Athletic	Braidwood Motor Company Stadium
15:00	Russell 55' (pen.); De Vita 56', 77'; Barr 90'	BBC Report		Attendance: 1,377; Referee: Clancy

1 March 2011	Livingston	3–0	Forfar Athletic	Braidwood Motor Company Stadium
19:45	Russell 5' (pen.); De Vita 61'; Winters 88'	BBC Report		Attendance: 724; Referee: David Somers

5 March 2011	Dumbarton	0–3	Livingston	Strathclyde Homes Stadium
15:00		BBC Report	Jacobs 5'; Russell 7'; Fox 70'	Attendance: 853; Referee: Roache

8 March 2011	Stenhousemuir	1–2	Livingston	Ochilview Park
19:30	Williams 76'	BBC Report	Russell 3'; De Vita 31'	Attendance: 431; Referee: Richmond

19 March 2011	Forfar Athletic	0–4	Livingston	Station Park
15:00		BBC Report	Deuchar 23', 57'; Fox 45'; Russell 60'	Attendance: 552; Referee: McKendrick

26 March 2011	East Fife	1–3	Livingston	Bayview Stadium
15:00	Wallace 60'	BBC Report	Deuchar 27', 70'; Jacobs 80'	Attendance: 707; Referee: Law

29 March 2011	Livingston	5–1	Peterhead	Braidwood Motor Company Stadium
19:45	Hamill 51'; Russell 62', 83'; De Vita 74'; Fox 89'	BBC Report	Bavidge 28'	Attendance: 754; Referee: Colvin

2 April 2011	Livingston	0–0	Brechin City	Braidwood Motor Company Stadium
15:00		BBC Report		Attendance: 1,553; Referee: Winter

9 April 2011	Stenhousemuir	0–3	Livingston	Ochilview Park
15:00		BBC Report	Jacobs 35'; Fox 59'; Sinclair 90'	Attendance: 837; Referee: Beaton

16 April 2011	Livingston	0–0	Ayr United	Braidwood Motor Company Stadium
15:00	Russell (red card) 36'	BBC Report		Attendance: 1,492; Referee: Finnie

19 April 2011	Livingston	3–2	Ayr United	Braidwood Motor Company Stadium
19:45		Liv Report		Attendance: 904; Referee: Law

23 April 2011	Airdrie United	2–4	Livingston	Excelsior Stadium
15:00	Lovering 32'; Owens 55'	BBC Report	Russell 5', 7'; De Vita 61'; McNulty 80'	Attendance: 872; Referee: Dunlop

30 April 2011	Livingston	1–1	Dumbarton	Braidwood Motor Company Stadium
15:00	Winters 80'	BBC Report	Walker 42'	Attendance: 1,549; Referee: O'Reilly

7 May 2011	Alloa Athletic	1–3	Livingston	Recreation Park
15:00	Dunlop 53'	BBC Report	Jacobs 43'; De Vita 77'; Russell 87'	Attendance: 647; Referee: Beaton

=== Scottish Challenge Cup ===
24 July 2010 First round	Queen's Park	3–2 (a.e.t.)	Livingston	Hampden Park
	Eaglesham 40', 96', 103' (pen.)	SFL Report	MacDonald 25'; Sinclair 119'	Attendance: 605; Referee: Clancy

=== Scottish League Cup ===
31 July 2010 First round	Ross County	2–1	Livingston	Starks Park
	Di Giacomo 37'; Vigurs (red card) 67'; Barrowman 69'	BBC Report	Russell 48'	Attendance: 1,215; Referee: O'Reilly

=== Scottish Cup ===
20 November 2010 Third round	Elgin City	2–1	Livingston	Borough Briggs
	Gunn 61'; Crooks 78'	BBC Report	Russell 74'	Attendance: 802; Referee: Hilland

== Statistics ==
=== Squad ===
No.	Pos	Nat	Player	Total		Second Division		Scottish Cup		League Cup		Challenge Cup	
No.	Pos	Nat	Player	Apps	Goals	Apps	Goals	Apps	Goals	Apps	Goals	Apps	Goals
	GK	(England) ENG	Tony Bullock	37	0	34	0	1	0	1	0	1	0
	GK	(Scotland) SCO	Darren Jamieson	1	0	1	0	0	0	0	0	0	0
	GK	(Scotland) SCO	Craig McDowall	2	0	1	0	0	0	0	0	1	0
	DF	(Scotland) SCO	Michael O'Byrne	14	0	12	0	0	0	1	0	1	0
	DF	(Scotland) SCO	Craig Barr	35	2	33	2	1	0	1	0	0	0
	DF	(Scotland) SCO	Cameron MacDonald	9	1	6	0	1	0	1	0	1	1
	DF	(Scotland) SCO	Callum Fordyce	3	0	3	0	0	0	0	0	0	0
	DF	(Scotland) SCO	Neil Hastings	1	0	1	0	0	0	0	0	0	0
	DF	(England) ENG	Jason Talbot	26	0	25	0	0	0	1	0	0	0
	DF	(Scotland) SCO	Paul Watson	35	1	33	1	1	0	0	0	1	0
	DF	(Scotland) SCO	Ross Docherty	1	0	1	0	0	0	0	0	0	0
	DF	(Scotland) SCO	David Cowan	9	0	9	0	0	0	0	0	0	0
	MF	(Scotland) SCO	David Sinclair	29	4	26	3	1	0	1	0	1	1
	MF	(Scotland) SCO	Liam Fox	34	7	32	7	1	0	1	0	0	0
	MF	(South Africa) RSA	Keaghan Jacobs	27	5	25	5	0	0	1	0	1	0
	MF	(South Africa) RSA	Kyle Jacobs	34	3	31	3	1	0	1	0	1	0
	MF	(South Africa) RSA	Devon Jacobs	13	0	13	0	0	0	0	0	0	0
	MF	(Scotland) SCO	Chris Malone	16	0	14	0	1	0	0	0	1	0
	MF	(Scotland) SCO	Joe Hamill	23	1	22	1	0	0	0	0	1	0
	MF	(Scotland) SCO	Aaron Conway	13	1	13	1	0	0	0	0	0	0
	MF	(Scotland) SCO	Ross Gray	1	0	1	0	0	0	0	0	0	0
	MF	(Scotland) SCO	Bobby Barr	27	4	24	4	1	0	1	0	1	0
	MF	(Scotland) SCO	Stefan Scougall	3	0	2	0	1	0	0	0	0	0
	FW	(Scotland) SCO	Kenny Deuchar	19	8	19	8	0	0	0	0	0	0
	FW	(Scotland) SCO	Marc McNulty	6	1	4	1	0	0	1	0	1	0
	FW	(Scotland) SCO	Iain Russell	36	24	34	22	1	1	1	1	0	0
	FW	(Italy) ITA	Raffaele De Vita	34	12	31	12	1	0	1	0	1	0
	FW	(Scotland) SCO	Robbie Winters	33	7	30	7	1	0	1	0	1	0

=== Disciplinary record ===
Nation	Position	Name		
Nation	Position	Name	Sent off (straight red)	Booked
(Scotland)	DF	Michael O'Byrne	2	8
(England)	DF	Craig Barr	0	10
(Scotland)	FW	Iain Russell	1	6
(Scotland)	MF	Liam Fox	0	8
(England)	DF	Jason Talbot	1	5
(Scotland)	MF	Bobby Barr	0	5
(South Africa)	MF	Kyle Jacobs	0	5
(England)	GK	Tony Bullock	1	2
(Scotland)	FW	Robbie Winters	1	2
(Scotland)	FW	Kenny Deuchar	0	3
(Italy)	FW	Raffaele De Vita	0	3
(South Africa)	MF	Keaghan Jacobs	0	3
(Scotland)	MF	Chris Malone	0	2
(Scotland)	DF	Ross Docherty	0	1
(South Africa)	MF	Devon Jacobs	0	1
(Scotland)	DF	Cameron MacDonald	0	1
(Scotland)	DF	Paul Watson	0	1
			6	66

=== League table ===
Pos	Team	Pld	W	D	L	GF	GA	GD	Pts	Promotion, qualification or relegation
1	Livingston (C, P)	36	25	7	4	79	33	+46	82	Promotion to the First Division
2	Ayr United (O, P)	36	18	5	13	62	55	+7	59	Qualification for the First Division play-offs
3	Forfar Athletic	36	17	8	11	50	48	+2	59	Qualification for the First Division play-offs
4	Brechin City	36	15	12	9	63	45	+18	57	Qualification for the First Division play-offs
5	East Fife	36	14	10	12	77	60	+17	52	

Source: SPFL
Rules for classification: 1) points; 2) goal difference; 3) number of goals scored.
(C) Champions; (O) Play-off winners; (P) Promoted
