= Rory Boulding =

English footballer (born 1988)

Personal information
- Full name: Rory Joseph Boulding
- Date of birth: 21 July 1988 (age 38)
- Place of birth: Sheffield, England
- Positions: Striker; winger

Youth career
- Mansfield Town

Senior career*
Years	Team	Apps	(Gls)
2006–2008	Mansfield Town	20	(0)
2006	→ Ilkeston Town (loan)	13	(0)
2007	→ Hucknall Town (loan)	2	(0)
2008–2010	Bradford City	3	(0)
2010–2011	Accrington Stanley	15	(2)
2011–2012	Livingston	25	(11)
2012–2013	Kilmarnock	4	(0)
2013	Dundee United	7	(1)
2014	Falkirk	4	(0)
2015	Livingston	4	(1)
Total		97	(15)
- * Club domestic league appearances and goals

Rory Joseph Boulding (born 21 July 1988) is an English former footballer who played as a striker or winger from 2006 until 2015.

Boulding started his career alongside his elder brother Michael at Mansfield Town. He had loan spells with Ilkeston Town and Hucknall Town before he joined Bradford City along with his brother in 2008. In 2010, he joined Accrington Stanley, before heading to Scotland in 2011, where he has played for Livingston, Kilmarnock, Dundee United and Falkirk before rejoining Livingston for a second spell in 2015.

== Career ==
=== Mansfield Town ===
Boulding began his footballing career as a trainee at Mansfield Town in August 2006, joining the club at the same time as his brother Michael. He started the 2006–07 season on loan at Ilkeston Town, returning to Mansfield to make his first-team debut as a substitute in the Football League Trophy match against Grimsby Town in October 2006 and his league debut as a substitute in the 5–0 victory against Torquay in January 2007. He did not start a game for Mansfield during his first season, coming on as substitute 11 times, but he signed a contract extension during the summer. In September 2007, he joined Hucknall Town on a one-month loan. He returned to Mansfield and scored his first senior goal in a first round FA Cup tie with Lewes. After Mansfield Town were relegated to the Football Conference at the end of the 2007–08 season, he was out of contract but was offered new terms by the club. In July 2008, he and his brother Michael both left Mansfield Town after turning down a contract offer to remain with the club in the Football Conference for the 2008–09 season.

=== Bradford City ===
Later the same month, the brothers signed for League Two side Bradford City, joining the team on their tour of Scotland. He was named as a substitute three times early in the season, without making a first-team appearance, but an ankle injury halted his progress. Rory Boulding made his first start for Bradford against Chesterfield in the final game of the 2008–09 season where Bradford City won 2–0; Boulding was replaced by Leon Osbourne after 57 minutes. His brother, Michael Boulding, scored the Bantams second goal. Both brothers had their contracts cancelled early by mutual consent in March 2010, with Rory having played just three games for the club.

=== Accrington Stanley ===
On 27 July 2010, Boulding joined fellow League Two side Accrington Stanley on a one-year contract, going on to make his debut on 7 August, in a 0–0 draw with Aldershot. He scored his first goal for the club on 4 September, in a 1–1 draw with Wycombe Wanderers. On 23 May, it was announced by Accrington that he would be released at the end of June 2011 when his current contract expired. In all he made seventeen appearances, scoring twice.

=== Livingston ===
In July 2011, Boulding joined Scottish First Division side Livingston on a one-year deal, after impressing on trial. He made his debut on 30 July 2011, scoring the first goal in a 6–0 win over Arbroath in the Scottish League Cup. On 26 November 2011, he was sent off for foul and abusive language in a match against Ross County. Bouldings's form picked up in the latter half of the season, scoring ten goals over six games, including a hat-trick over Raith Rovers and in doing so picked up the Ginger Boot award for April 2012. He left the club at the end of the season, after failing to agree terms on a new contract. In all he made thirty two appearances, scoring thirteen times.

=== Kilmarnock ===
Following his departure from Livingston he first joined Scottish Premier League side Heart of Midlothian, and then Kilmarnock on trial. On 21 July 2012, Boulding signed for Kilmarnock on a three-year contract. After just six months and making only four appearances, Boulding was released from his contract on 16 January 2013.

=== Dundee United ===
In March 2013, Boulding went on trial with Dundee United, who were short of forward players following an injury to Johnny Russell. He subsequently signed a short-term contract until the end of the season. On 6 April 2013, Boulding scored his first goal for Dundee United in dramatic fashion. The goal, an injury time winner against Aberdeen, saw United clinch 6th spot just before the split at the expense of Boulding's old club, Kilmarnock. At the end of the season Boulding's contract with Dundee United was not extended.

=== Falkirk ===
After a season out, Boulding went on trial with Falkirk in the Scottish Championship, and went on to sign a short-term deal until January 2015.

He made his debut coming off the bench in a 1–0 win against Hibernian at Easter Road. After a couple more appearances from the bench - most notably coming on as a substitute in a 2–1 win against Alloa Athletic and playing a significant role in helping Falkirk win the match - he made his first start against Queen of the South the following game. Falkirk lost the match 3–0, and Boulding was substituted at half time. This was to be his last appearance for Falkirk, as in November 2014, his contract was terminated and he left the club early. He made six appearances in all competitions.

=== Livingston ===
Boulding re-signed for Livingston in March 2015, but left the club later in the year.

== Personal life ==
Rory Boulding was born on 21 July 1988 in Sheffield, England, to Mick and Deirdre Boulding. His siblings include fellow footballer Michael, singer-songwriter Helen, tennis player Sally, and Laura, who plays rounders for England.

== Career statistics ==
As of 22 October 2014

Appearances and goals by club, season and competition
Club	Season	League		FA Cup		League Cup		Other		Total	
Club	Season	App	Goals	App	Goals	App	Goals	App	Goals	App	Goals
Mansfield Town	2006–07	9	0	0	0	0	0	2	0	11	0
Mansfield Town	2007–08	11	0	3	1	1	0	1	0	16	1
Bradford City	2008–09	1	0	0	0	0	0	0	0	1	0
Bradford City	2009–10	2	0	0	0	0	0	0	0	2	0
Accrington Stanley	2010–11	15	2	1	0	0	0	1	0	17	2
Livingston	2011–12	25	11	2	1	2	1	3	0	32	13
Kilmarnock	2012–13	4	0	0	0	0	0	0	0	4	0
Dundee United	2012–13	8	1	1	0	0	0	0	0	9	1
Falkirk	2014–15	4	0	0	0	1	0	1	0	6	0
Total	79	14	7	2	4	1	8	0	98	96	17
