= Michael Scott (footballer, born 1993) =

Scottish footballer (born 1993)

Personal information
- Full name: Michael Scott
- Date of birth: 3 June 1993 (age 33)
- Place of birth: Scotland
- Position: Midfielder

Team information
- Current team: Christos FC
- Number: 8

College career
Years	Team	Apps	(Gls)
2012–2015	UMBC Retrievers	80	(8)

Senior career*
Years	Team	Apps	(Gls)
2012	Livingston	1	(0)
2017–	Christos FC		
- * Club domestic league appearances and goals as of 14 June 2017

Michael Scott (born 3 June 1993) is a Scottish professional footballer, who played as a midfielder for Livingston in the Scottish First Division and now plays for Christos FC in the United States Adult Soccer Association.

== Early life ==
Scott grew up in Dalgety Bay and attended Inverkeithing High School, where he was depute head boy.

== Career ==
Scott played for Dunfermline Athletic, Heart of Midlothian and East Fife as a youth player, before signing for Livingston. He has also represented Scotland as an Under 18 School Boy Internationalist.

=== Livingston ===
A member of Livingston's under 19 squad, Scott made his first team debut on 10 March 2012, playing from the start in a 3–1 victory over Greenock Morton in the Scottish First Division.

=== UMBC Retrievers ===
Scott began a soccer scholarship at UMBC in August 2012. In his first full season, Scott started 2 games but appeared in all 20 matches the team played, including 2 in the NCAA D1 National Tournament. He scored his lone goal of the season against Hartford at home on 24 October 2012. As a team, UMBC won the America East Conference on penalties vs. the University of New Hampshire.

In his second season Scott started 1 game at University of Massachusetts Lowell and played 90 minutes, scoring the game-winning goal in a 2–0 victory. He appeared in 15 games that season including the 2nd round NCAA tournament match that UMBC hosted against the University of Connecticut, where the Retrievers would fall on PKs. Again though, UMBC would win the America East Conference title as well as the Regular Season title. That year the squad's overall record was 16-1-3, earning the highest win percentage (.875) in the nation and an end of season rank of #14 by NSCAA.

In Scott's 3rd Season he would become more of a playing factor, starting 20 games out of a possible 25 but appearing in them all. He would add 2 goals and 3 assists on the season from his wide midfield position. UMBC again won the America East Conference and would appear in the NCAA D1 National Tournament again for a 3rd straight year, and would reach the 'College Cup' before being beaten by the University of Virginia, 1–0, the eventual National Champion in the semi-finals. Along the way the squad would set numerous tournament records by winning 4 games in a row all away from home and not conceding in any of the 4 games either, their run was hailed a 'Cinderella Story'. Scott would be awarded All-Conference honors on the America East All-Academic team. He would also receive the Coaches' Award at the end of season team banquet.

The 2015 season was Scott's senior campaign and he was named a Team Captain for the year. He would start in all 20 games the team played that year and added 4 goals and 6 assists on the season. His 6 assists would lead the team and 4 goals tie for second. UMBC would eventually fall in 2OT in the America East Conference semi-final to eventual conference champions Vermont. At the end of the season, Scott would be honored with America East All-Academic team for the second straight year and also to the All-Conference second team.

Ending his career at UMBC, Scott appeared in 80 games total, which is good to tie 3rd place on the all-time appearances at UMBC. He started in 38 of those appearances, scoring 8 goals and adding 8 assists.

=== Christos FC ===
Upon ending his career at UMBC, Scott would join local amateur team Christos FC In his first season with the team, Scott would become a double National Champion, winning the National Amateur Cup and the Amateur portion of the U.S. Open Cup. Along the way to winning these titles, he would also help the team to win State and Regional titles as well.

== Career statistics ==
As of 10 March 2012

Club statistics
Club	Season	League		Scottish Cup		League Cup		Other		Total	
Club	Season	App	Goals	App	Goals	App	Goals	App	Goals	App	Goals
Livingston	2011–12	1	0	0	0	0	0	0	0	1	0
Total		1	0	0	0	0	0	0	0	1	0
