= Connor McDonald =

Scottish footballer

Personal information
- Full name: Connor McDonald
- Date of birth: 15 April 1994 (age 32)
- Place of birth: Edinburgh, Scotland
- Height: 5 ft 7 in (1.70 m)
- Positions: Left back; midfielder

Youth career
- Tynecastle
- 2010–2012: Livingston

Senior career*
Years	Team	Apps	(Gls)
2012–2014	Livingston	18	(0)
- Lothian Thistle
2020–2021	Edinburgh South		
- * Club domestic league appearances and goals

Connor McDonald (born 15 April 1994) is a Scottish professional footballer.

== Career ==
=== Livingston ===
A member of Livingston's under 19 squad, McDonald was promoted to the first team on 24 March 2012, where he was an unused substitute in a win over Falkirk. He was an unused substitute on one further occasion, before making his debut aged 17 as an early substitute on 7 April 2012 against Ross County. He made his first start for the club the early following season in Scottish Challenge Cup match against Annan Athletic on 28 July 2012, before then making his first league start on 25 August 2012 in a 0–0 draw against Raith Rovers at Starks Park.

In May 2020, McDonald signed for Edinburgh South until 2021.

== Career statistics ==
Appearances and goals by club, season and competition
Club	Season	League			Scottish Cup		League Cup		Other		Total	
Club	Season	Division	Apps	Goals	Apps	Goals	Apps	Goals	Apps	Goals	Apps	Goals
Livingston	2011–12	Scottish First Division	3	0	0	0	0	0	0	0	3	0
Livingston	2012–13	Scottish First Division	5	0	0	0	2	0	0	0	7	0
Livingston	2013–14	Scottish Championship	10	0	0	0	3	0	1 (Note: Appearance(s) in Scottish Challenge Cup)	0	14	0
Career total			18	0	0	0	5	0	1	0	24	0
