= Raffaele De Vita =

Italian footballer (born 1987)

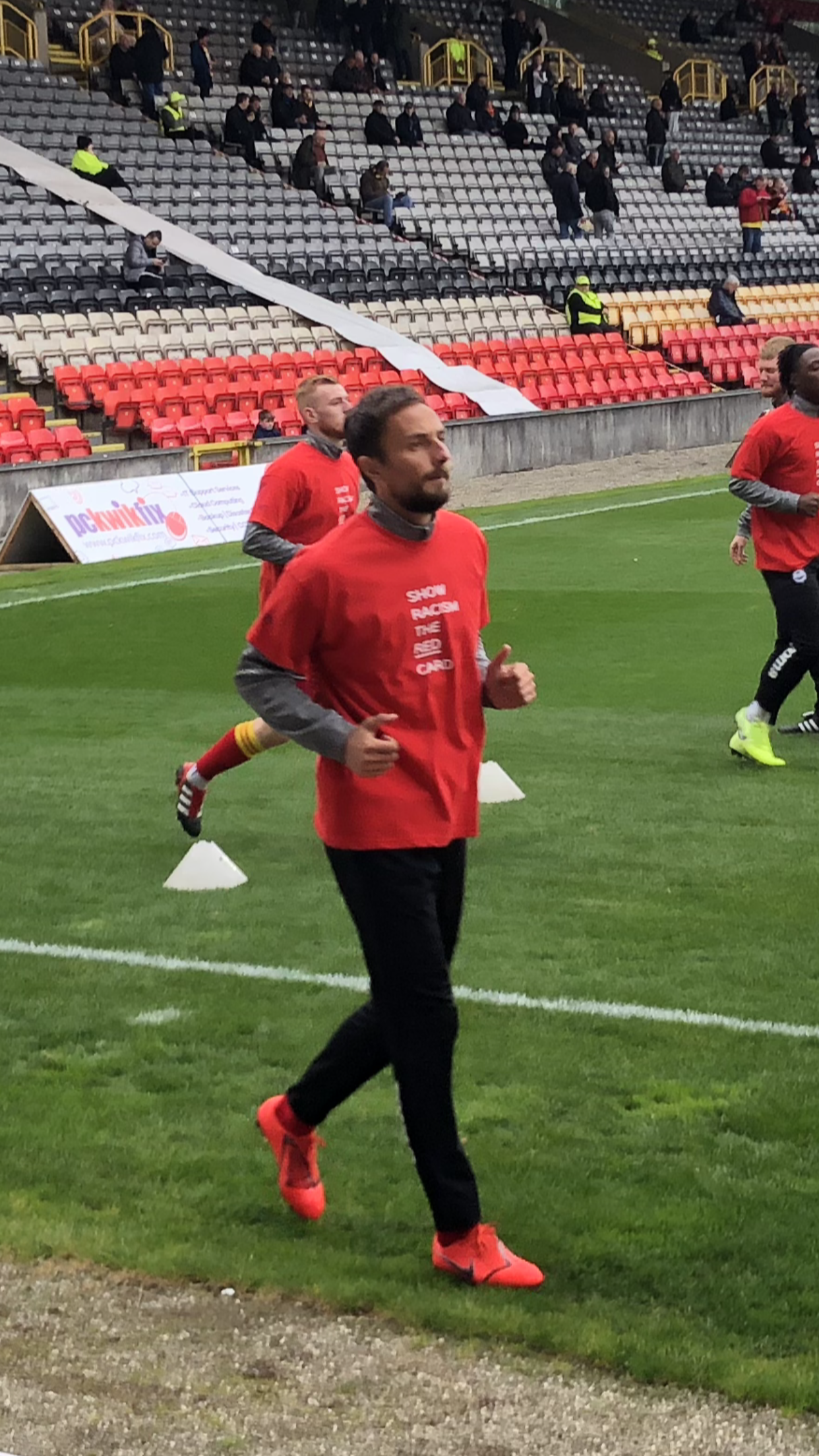
- De Vita warming up for Partick Thistle in 2019.

Personal information
- Full name: Raffaele De Vita
- Date of birth: 23 September 1987 (age 39)
- Place of birth: Rome, Italy
- Positions: Winger; midfielder

Team information
- Current team: Anagni

Youth career
- 2004–2008: Blackburn Rovers

Senior career*
Years	Team	Apps	(Gls)
2008–2011	Livingston	69	(22)
2011–2013	Swindon Town	74	(12)
2013–2014	Bradford City	20	(1)
2014	Cheltenham Town	10	(3)
2015–2016	Ross County	33	(3)
2016–2021	Livingston	56	(6)
2019	→ Partick Thistle (loan)	9	(1)
2020	→ Falkirk (loan)	7	(0)
2020–2021	→ Edinburgh City (loan)	19	(3)
2021-2022	Lupa Frascati	1	(0)
2022-	Anagni		
- * Club domestic league appearances and goals as of 23:05, 25 November 2021 (UTC)

Raffaele De Vita (born 23 September 1987) is an Italian professional footballer who plays as a midfielder for Italian side Anagni. De Vita started his career with Blackburn Rovers, and has also played for Swindon Town, Bradford City, Cheltenham Town, Ross County, Partick Thistle, Falkirk, Edinburgh City, and Livingston.

== Career ==
Born in Rome, Italy, De Vita grew up supporting Lazio and idolised Paolo Di Canio, who later coached him when he joined Swindon Town. De Vita began his career at a boys club in Rome, it has previously been reported as being the Roma academy, which was ironic, due to the fact De Vita supported Roma's rivals, Lazio - De Vita himself set these rumours straight in an interview with The Athletic) until he was scouted by Blackburn Rovers, which he said came "out of nowhere".

De Vita began his career with Blackburn Rovers but did not make an appearance for the first team. He joined Scottish club Livingston in July 2008. At one point, De Vita considered quitting Livingston, as a result of the club entering administration, but continued to play for the club, after Gary Bollan had come in as manager and he had regained his fitness. He made his debut on 14 February 2009 against St Johnstone, and the following week scored his first goal against Dundee. At the end of the 2010–11 season, during which he helped the club win promotion to the Scottish First Division, De Vita was among seven players to be released by the club despite becoming a fans' favourite. During his career at Livingston, he made 67 league appearances and scored 22 goals.

=== Swindon Town ===
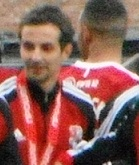
De Vita in 2012

In June 2011, he signed for Swindon Town on a two-year contract.

He made his debut on 6 August, in a 3–0 win against Crewe Alexandra, ensuring new manager Paolo di Canio's first competitive game in charge of Swindon ended with a win. He scored his first goal for the club on 24 August, in a 1–0 win against Championship side Bristol City in the League Cup. He scored his first league goal for the club on 24 September, opening the scoring in a 4–0 win against Barnet. He followed this up with goals against Hereford United, Plymouth Argyle, Huddersfield Town and Morecambe to finish his debut season with six goals, and helped Swindon to win the League Two title.

He made his first appearance of the 2012–13 season on 14 August in a 3–0 win against Brighton & Hove Albion in the League Cup. He scored his first goal of the season a week later, with Swindon now in League One, in a 3–0 win against Crawley Town. After scoring in a defeat to Preston North End, he then scored in back-to-back games in October, in a 2–1 defeat to Crewe and a 4–0 victory against Stevenage. In December 2012, he then scored twice in a 2–0 win against Oldham Athletic, before scoring again in the following game, a 5–0 win against Tranmere Rovers. He then scored his final goal of the season on 5 January 2013, in a 4–0 win against Carlisle United. He helped Swindon to finish in the play-off positions, and played in the second leg of the semi-final against Brentford, which finished 3–3, leaving the tie 4–4 on aggregate, with Brentford then going on to win the penalty shoot-out 5–4. He was then released by the club along with five other players, at the end of the season.

=== Bradford City ===
After training with the club for over two weeks, and scoring as a trialist in a 4–0 win in a pre-season game against Guiseley De Vita signed for Bradford City on a one-year contract on 30 July 2013.

He made his debut on 3 August on the opening day of the season in a 2–2 draw against Bristol City, and assisted Rory McArdle's later equaliser. He scored his first goal for the club on 26 October, opening the scoring in a 2–1 defeat against Wolverhampton Wanderers. However, De Vita's first team opportunities were soon limited, due to a thigh injury that kept him out for months. After months on the sidelines, De Vita made his first team return on 11 April 2014, coming on as a substitute for Matthew Dolan in the 77th minute, in a 0–0 draw against Rotherham United.

After making twenty-three appearances and scoring once in all competitions by the end of the 2013–14 season, De Vita's contract with the club expired and he was invited back for pre-season training in the hope of earning a new deal. However, it was made clear that De Vita would not return to Bradford City following the conclusion of the club's pre-season friendly matches.

=== Cheltenham Town ===
De Vita joined Cheltenham Town on a three-month contract on 25 September 2014. De Vita made his Cheltenham Town debut two days later, coming on as a substitute for John Marquis in the 83rd minute, in a 1–0 loss against Burton Albion on 27 September 2014.

After making thirteen appearances for the club during the first half of the season, De Vita was released by the club after the expiry of his contract in late-December.

=== Ross County ===
On 30 January 2015, De Vita signed for Scottish Premiership club Ross County. On his debut for the club, he scored the winning goal in a 3–2 victory over Motherwell on 14 February 2015. Seven days later he scored again, this time against Partick Thistle at Firhill, as the Staggies secured a 3–1 away victory. On 12 April 2015, De Vita was named as SPFL Player of the Month for March 2015.

With his impressive displays helping Ross County avoid relegation, De Vita signed a new contract in May 2015, keeping him at the club until 2017. He scored his first goal of the 2016–17 season in a League Cup match, as Ross County thrashed Falkirk 7–0 on 22 September 2015. On 30 June 2016, De Vita was released by Ross County, despite his contract still having a year left.

=== Livingston return ===
After being without a club for four months, De Vita signed on for his second spell with Scottish League One side Livingston in October 2016.

==== Loans from Livingston ====
De Vita joined Scottish Championship club Partick Thistle on a season long Loan for the 2019/20 season. De Vita scored his first goal for Thistle in a 3-2 league defeat away to Morton. De Vita scored his second goal for the Jags in a 2–0 win at home to Welsh side Connah Quay Nomands in the Scottish Challenge Cup. Livingston recalled De Vita from his loan spell on New Year's Day 2020. The same day Falkirk announced they had signed him on loan until the end of the season; a season which ended early due to the COVID-19 pandemic.

He was loaned to Edinburgh City in October 2020. De vita was released by Livingston at the end of the 2020–21 season.

=== Return to Italy ===
De Vita signed for Anagni in 2022.

== Career statistics ==
As of match played 5 October 2020

Appearances and goals by club, season and competition
Club	Season	League			National cup		League cup		Other		Total	
Club	Season	Division	Apps	Goals	Apps	Goals	Apps	Goals	Apps	Goals	Apps	Goals
Livingston	2008–09	Scottish First Division	7	1	0	0	0	0	0	0	7	1
Livingston	2009–10	Scottish Third Division	29	9	4 (Note: Includes one appearance not recorded on Soccerbase or Soccerway. "Queen's Park 1–3 Livingston". BBC Sport. 24 October 2009.)	2	0	0	0	0	33	11
Livingston	2010–11	Scottish Second Division	33	12	1	0	1	0	1 (Note: Appearances in the Scottish Challenge Cup)	0	36	12
Livingston	Total		69	22	5	2	1	0	1	0	76	24
Swindon Town	2011–12	Football League Two	38	4	4	1	1	1	3 (Note: Appearances in the Football League Trophy)	0	46	6
Swindon Town	2012–13	Football League One	36	8	1	0	2	0	2 (Note: One appearance in the Football League Trophy and one in the EFL League One play-offs)	0	41	8
Swindon Town	Total		74	12	5	1	3	1	5	0	87	14
Bradford City	2013–14	Football League One	20	1	1	0	1	0	1	0	23	1
Bradford City	2014–15	Football League One	0	0	0	0	0	0	0	0	0	0
Bradford City	Total		20	1	1	0	1	0	1	0	23	1
Cheltenham Town	2014–15	Football League Two	10	0	2	0	0	0	1	0	13	0
Ross County	2014–15	Scottish Premiership	14	3	0	0	0	0	0	0	14	3
Ross County	2015–16	Scottish Premiership	19	0	4	1	2	1	0	0	25	2
Ross County	Total		33	3	4	1	2	1	0	0	39	5
Livingston	2016–17	Scottish League One	23	3	2	0	0	0	2	1	27	4
Livingston	2017–18	Scottish Championship	30	3	0	0	6	2	4 (Note: Two appearances in the Scottish Challenge Cup and two appearances and one goal in the Scottish Premiership play-offs)	1	40	6
Livingston	2018–19	Scottish Premiership	3	0	0	0	0	0	0	0	3	0
Livingston	2020–21	Scottish Premiership	0	0	0	0	0	0	—		0	0
Livingston	Total		56	6	2	0	6	2	6	2	70	10
Career total			262	44	19	4	13	4	14	2	308	54

== Honours ==
Livingston

- Scottish Football League Third Division: 2009–10
- Scottish Football League Second Division: 2010–11
- Scottish League One: 2016–17

Swindon Town

- Football League Two: 2011–12
- Football League Trophy runner-up: 2011–12

Ross County

- Scottish League Cup: 2015–16

Individual

- SPFL Player of the Month: March 2015
