= George Cairns (born 1969) =

Scottish football coach

Personal information
- Full name: George Cairns
- Date of birth: 9 May 1969 (age 57)
- Place of birth: Scotland

Managerial career
- Years: Team
- 2020–2024: Hamilton Academical (academy manager)
- 2021: Hamilton Academical (interim)

George Cairns (born 9 May 1969) is a Scottish football coach who is currently the academy director of Scottish Premiership club Livingston.

== Career ==
Cairns held the positions of Head of Academy Coaching and Academy Manager with Hamilton Academical during his 20-year spell with the club. He is credited with helping to bring through talented players from the youth academy and develop them into first team footballers, prime examples being Lewis Ferguson and James McCarthy.

He was appointed interim manager of the Accies, alongside Guillaume Beuzelin, in 2021 following the departure of Brian Rice.

In June 2024, Cairn left his position with the Accies.

He was appointed academy director of Livingston in June 2025.
