= Ross Gray (footballer) =

Scottish footballer

Personal information
- Date of birth: 21 September 1992 (age 34)
- Place of birth: Hill of Beath, Scotland
- Height: 5 ft 7 in (1.70 m)
- Position: Midfielder

Team information
- Current team: Tranent
- Number: 20

Youth career
- Cowdenbeath
- 2010–2011: Livingston

Senior career*
Years	Team	Apps	(Gls)
2011–2013	Livingston	12	(0)
2011–2012	→ Berwick Rangers (loan)	20	(1)
2012–2013	→ Berwick Rangers (loan)	9	(4)
2013–2015	Berwick Rangers	30	(1)
2015–2016	Selkirk		
2016	Spartans		
2016–2017	Linlithgow Rose		
2017–2024	Bonnyrigg Rose		
2024–	Tranent	15	(1)
- * Club domestic league appearances and goals as of 14 December 2024

Ross Gray (born 21 September 1992) is a Scottish footballer who plays as a midfielder for Lowland League East club Tranent. He has previously played in the Scottish Football League First Division for Livingston.

== Career ==
=== Livingston ===
A product of Livingston's youth team, Gray made his first team début as a substitute on 7 May 2011, against Alloa Athletic on the final day of the season. The following season on 9 August 2011, he came on as a substitute in Livingston's 5–0 victory over Stirling Albion in the Challenge Cup. After just two first team appearances he was loaned out to Berwick Rangers. Another loan spell followed and on 8 May 2012, he signed a one-year contract extension to remain with the club. In October 2012, Gray was once again loaned to Berwick.

=== Berwick Rangers ===
On 21 October 2011, he was loaned to Third Division side Berwick Rangers on a one-month emergency loan deal, making his début the following day in the Scottish Cup. Gray went on to make his league debut on 5 November against Elgin City. After four appearances for Berwick his loan deal was extended by an extra month. He scored his first competitive goal on 26 November, in their 5–3 win over Montrose at Links Park. Berwick requested his loan be extended further but due to injuries at Livingston he was recalled. His return to Livingston was short and on 7 January 2012, he returned to Berwick until 5 May. In all he made 20 appearances for Berwick.

The following season on 27 October 2012, Gray returned to Berwick on a three-month loan deal. He made his debut the same day, coming on as a 58th-minute substitute against Queen's Park, replacing Neil Janczyk in a 1–1 draw. After leaving Livingston, Gray signed for Berwick permanently in May 2013.

Released by Berwick manager Colin Cameron in the summer of 2015, Gray signed for Lowland League side Selkirk before moving on to Spartans in January 2016. He signed for Junior side Linlithgow Rose in July 2016.

== Career statistics ==
As of 30 October 2012

Club statistics
Club	Season	League		Scottish Cup		League Cup		Other		Total	
Club	Season	App	Goals	App	Goals	App	Goals	App	Goals	App	Goals
Livingston	2010–11 season	1	0	0	0	0	0	0	0	1	0
Livingston	2011–12 season	0	0	0	0	0	0	1	0	1	0
Livingston	2012–13 season	3	0	0	0	2	0	0	0	5	0
Berwick Rangers	2011–12 season	19	1	1	0	0	0	0	0	20	1
Berwick Rangers	2012–13 season	1	0	0	0	0	0	0	0	1	0
Total		24	1	1	0	2	0	1	0	28	1
