= Stefan Scougall =

Scottish footballer

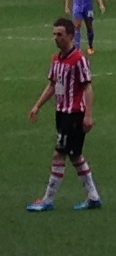
- Scougall playing for Sheffield United in 2014

Personal information
- Full name: Stefan Lewis Scougall
- Date of birth: 7 December 1992 (age 33)
- Place of birth: Edinburgh, Scotland
- Position: Attacking midfielder

Team information
- Current team: Alloa Athletic
- Number: 12

Youth career
- 2003–2009: Hibernian
- 2009–2010: Dunfermline Athletic

Senior career*
Years	Team	Apps	(Gls)
2010–2014	Livingston	70	(9)
2014–2017	Sheffield United	76	(7)
2016	→ Fleetwood Town (loan)	10	(1)
2017–2019	St Johnstone	25	(1)
2019–2020	Carlisle United	35	(3)
2020–	Alloa Athletic	165	(15)

International career
2012–2014	Scotland U21	2	(0)
- * Club domestic league appearances and goals as of 4 May 2026

Stefan Lewis Scougall (born 7 December 1992) is a Scottish professional footballer who plays as an attacking midfielder for Scottish League One club Alloa Athletic.

Born in Edinburgh, Scougall began his professional career with Livingston. He has since also played for Sheffield United, Fleetwood Town, St Johnstone and Carlisle United. He has also represented his country at under 21 level.

== Club career ==
=== Livingston ===
Scougall won the SFL under-19 League in 2010–11. After playing youth football for Hibernian and Dunfermline Athletic, Scougall made his senior debut for Livingston on 16 October 2010 as a substitute in a 4–1 win against Stenhousemuir in the Scottish Second Division, making two further appearances that season as Livingston sealed the Second Division title. Scougall became a regular for the West Lothian side the following season in the First Division, and was rewarded with a new long-term contract in September 2012, designed to keep him at Almondvale until the summer of 2016. Scougall's performances for Livingston saw him attract the attention of scouts from Arsenal and Swansea City, and in April 2013, Scougall was one of four players to be nominated for the Scottish First Division Player's Player of the Year award for the 2012–13 season.

=== Sheffield United ===
In January 2014, Scougall joined English club Sheffield United, signing a three-and-a-half-year deal, for an undisclosed fee. Scougall made his debut for United in a FA Cup tie against Fulham on 26 January, coming on as a half time substitute. Scougall's first goal in United colours came on 8 February 2014 against Shrewsbury Town at Bramall Lane. Scougall was part of the Sheffield United team that reached the FA Cup semi final, played at Wembley Stadium, and scored Sheffield United's second goal in a 5–3 defeat at the hands of Hull City.

Scougall was released by Sheffield United in May 2017.

=== St Johnstone ===
On 17 June 2017, Scougall signed a two-year deal with St Johnstone.

=== Carlisle United ===
Scougall signed for Carlisle United on short-term deal on 31 January 2019 after being released by St Johnstone. He was offered a new contract by Carlisle at the end of the 2018–19 season. He signed a new one-year contract with the club in June 2019.

=== Alloa Athletic ===
Scougall signed for Scottish Championship club Alloa Athletic in October 2020/21.

== International career ==
On 8 October 2012, Scougall was named in the Scotland under-21 squad for two friendly matches against the USA and Canada, and duly made his debut on 12 October 2012 against the USA. Scougall was once again named in the Scotland under-21 squad to face Greece in February 2013 but withdrew from the squad due to injury. Scougall's impressive form at Sheffield United earned him a recall to the Under-21s for a 2015 Under-21 Euro Qualifying match against the Netherlands on 28 May 2014, where he went on to make his second appearance for the under-21s as 75th-minute substitute in a 6–1 defeat.

== Personal life ==
Born in Edinburgh, Scougall is the younger brother of former Dunfermline Athletic and East Fife youth player Alex Scougall. Scougall almost quit football when he was released by Hibernian. He worked part-time on the checkout at Sainsbury's and considered applying for a job alongside his father in the roads department at Edinburgh council.

== Career statistics ==
As of match played 6 November 2021

Appearances and goals by club, season and competition
Club	Season	League			National Cup		League Cup		Other		Total	
Club	Season	Division	Apps	Goals	Apps	Goals	Apps	Goals	Apps	Goals	Apps	Goals
Livingston	2010–11	Scottish Second Division	2	0	1	0	0	0	0	0	3	0
Livingston	2011–12	Scottish First Division	24	1	2	0	1	0	3 (Note: Appearances in the Scottish Challenge Cup)	1	30	2
Livingston	2012–13	Scottish First Division	28	6	1	0	3	0	1	0	33	6
Livingston	2013–14	Scottish Championship	16	2	1	0	1	0	0	0	18	2
Livingston	Total		70	9	5	0	5	0	4	1	84	10
Sheffield United	2013–14	League One	15	2	5	1	0	0	0	0	20	3
Sheffield United	2014–15	League One	25	1	5	0	3	0	2 (Note: One appearance in the Football League Trophy and one in the League One play-offs)	0	35	1
Sheffield United	2015–16	League One	11	0	2	0	1	0	2 (Note: Appearances in the Football League Trophy)	1	16	1
Sheffield United	2016–17	League One	25	4	2	1	1	0	1 (Note: Appearance in the EFL Trophy)	0	29	5
Sheffield United	Total		76	7	14	2	5	0	5	1	100	10
Fleetwood Town (loan)	2015–16	League One	10	1	0	0	0	0	0	0	10	1
St Johnstone	2017–18	Scottish Premiership	24	1	0	0	1	0	2 (Note: Appearances in the Europa League)	0	27	1
St Johnstone	2018–19	Scottish Premiership	1	0	0	0	5	1	0	0	6	1
St Johnstone	Total		25	1	0	0	6	1	2	0	33	2
Carlisle United	2018–19	League Two	15	1	0	0	0	0	0	0	15	1
Carlisle United	2019–20	League Two	20	2	4	0	2	0	1	0	27	2
Carlisle United	Total		35	3	4	0	2	0	1	0	42	3
Alloa Athletic	2020–21	Scottish Championship	16	1	1	0	5	1	—		22	2
Alloa Athletic	2021–22	Scottish League One	11	1	0	0	4	0	2	1	17	2
Alloa Athletic	Total		27	2	1	0	9	1	2	1	39	4
Career total			243	23	24	2	27	1	14	3	308	29

== Honours ==
Sheffield United

- EFL League One: 2016–17
