= Kyle Lander =

Scottish footballer (born 1996)

Personal information
- Date of birth: 21 January 1996 (age 30)
- Place of birth: Scotland
- Position: Striker

Youth career
- Edina Hibs
- 2012–2013: Livingston

Senior career*
Years	Team	Apps	(Gls)
2013–2014	Livingston	11	(1)
2014–2016	St Johnstone	0	(0)
2015	→ Stirling Albion (loan)	6	(0)
2016	→ Elgin City (loan)	4	(0)
2016–2019	Newtongrange Star		
2019-2022	Tranent Juniors		
- * Club domestic league appearances and goals as of 19:39, 10 May 2017 (UTC)

Kyle Lander (born 21 January 1996) is a Scottish former professional footballer, who played as a striker for Newtongrange Star in the East of Scotland League. He has previously played for Livingston

== Career ==
=== Livingston ===
Lander signed for Livingston at youth level in 2012 from Edina Hibs Boys Club. On 6 April 2013, he scored on his first-team debut at the age of 17 in a 3–0 win over Dumbarton. In total, he made 6 appearances in his debut season for Livingston in the first-team.

=== St Johnstone ===
Ahead of the 2014–15 season Lander moved to St Johnstone. On 1 September 2015, he moved on loan to Stiring Albion and had a further loan spell at Elgin City later the same season.

=== Juniors ===
On his release from St Johnstone, Lander joined Junior side Newtongrange Star in September 2016.

Lander played for Tranent Juniors between 2019 and 2022, but had to retire at 26 due to injury.

== Career statistics ==
As of 5 May 2013

Club	Season	League		FA Cup		League Cup		Other		Total	
Club	Season	Apps	Goals	Apps	Goals	Apps	Goals	Apps	Goals	Apps	Goals
Livingston	2012–13	6	1	0	0	0	0	0	0	6	1
Livingston	2013–14	5	0	0	0	0	0	0	0	5	0
Livingston	Total	11	1	0	0	0	0	0	0	11	1
St Johnstone	2014–15	0	0	0	0	0	0	0	0	0	0
St Johnstone	2015–16	0	0	0	0	0	0	0	0	0	0
St Johnstone	Total	0	0	0	0	0	0	0	0	0	0
Stirling Albion (loan)	2015–16	0	0	0	0	0	0	0	0	0	0
Total		11	1	0	0	0	0	0	0	11	1
