= Adam Mansour =

French footballer (born 1992)

Personal information
- Full name: Adam Mansour
- Date of birth: 17 March 1992 (age 34)
- Place of birth: Paris, France
- Position: Goalkeeper

Youth career
- -2014: Auxerre

Senior career*
Years	Team	Apps	(Gls)
2014	Livingston	0	(0)
2016-2017	US Ivry	4	(0)
- * Club domestic league appearances and goals

Adam Mansour (born 17 March 1992) is a French born Egyptian former professional footballer who played as a goalkeeper.

== Club career ==
Mansour came through the youth academy of Auxerre, however he left the club in 2014 without making a single first team appearance.

The goalkeeper signed for Scottish side Livingston in 2014 on a one-year contract. Mansour left Livi later in 2014 without making a single first team appearance.

After two years without a club, Mansour signed for US Ivry in December 2016.

== International career ==
In May 2011, Mansour was called up to the Egypt U20 squad.
