= Iain Russell =

Scottish footballer (born 1982)

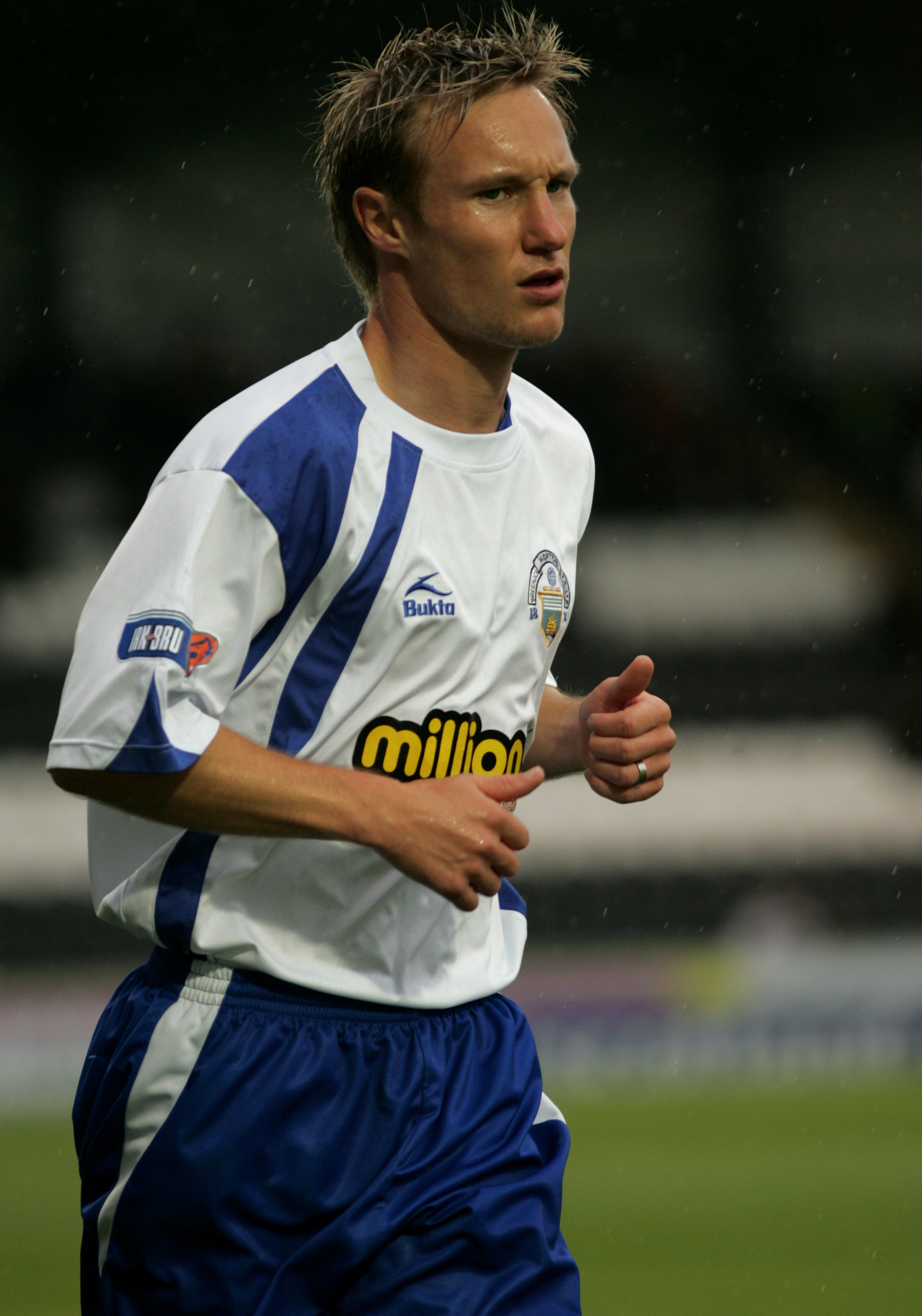
- Russell with Greenock Morton in 2009

Personal information
- Full name: Iain Thomas Russell
- Date of birth: 14 November 1982 (age 43)
- Place of birth: Dumfries, Scotland
- Height: 1.80 m (5 ft 11 in)
- Position: Forward

Youth career
- Annan Athletic
- Rangers

Senior career*
| Years | Team | Apps | (Gls) |
| 2002–2003 | Motherwell | 5 | (0) |
| 2003 | → Dumbarton (loan) | 11 | (3) |
| 2003–2006 | Dumbarton | 92 | (28) |
| 2006–2007 | Brechin City | 36 | (25) |
| 2007–2010 | Greenock Morton | 60 | (11) |
| 2009 | → Alloa Athletic (loan) | 6 | (1) |
| 2010 | → Stirling Albion (loan) | 10 | (7) |
| 2010–2013 | Livingston | 93 | (44) |
| 2013–2016 | Queen of the South | 97 | (32) |
| 2016–2017 | Airdrieonians | 32 | (18) |
| 2018–2019 | Dumbarton | 23 | (1) |
| 2019–2021 | Pollok | 0 | (0) |
| 2020–2021 | → Cowdenbeath (loan) | 14 | (2) |
| Total | | 479 | (172) |
- * Club domestic league appearances and goals

Iain Thomas Russell (born 14 November 1982) is a Scottish former professional footballer who played as a forward.

Russell came through the youth teams at Annan Athletic and Rangers before making a few appearances for Motherwell. Since leaving the Well, Russell has also played for Brechin City, Greenock Morton, Alloa Athletic and Stirling Albion (both loan spells), Livingston, Queen of the South, and Airdrieonians.

== Background ==
Russell was born in Dumfries and grew up nearby in Annan. Russell is the grandson of the former Airdrieonians, Rangers and Scotland internationalist, Ian McMillan.

== Career ==
=== Motherwell and Dumbarton ===
Russell started his career at Rangers, although he did not feature for the first team, and first played in the first team for Motherwell and then Dumbarton. He played over 100 games for Dumbarton and was the club's player of the year in 2005.

=== Brechin City ===
Russell struggled with a hamstring injury throughout the opening period of his Brechin City career, but two goals against Stranraer on 28 October 2006 at Glebe Park saw him open his account. He was the season's top scorer with 15 goals to his name.

Russell was working his way through a quantity surveying degree at Glasgow Caledonian University whilst at Brechin. Since signing on full-time at Morton it has been put on hold. In February 2007, Russell signed a new contract with Brechin.

=== Greenock Morton, Alloa Athletic and Stirling Albion ===
Russell left for Greenock Morton in August 2007 for an undisclosed fee (believed to be £40,000). He scored nine goals in all competitions in his first season with Morton, finishing two goals behind top goalscorer Peter Weatherson.

In September 2009, Russell was loaned out to Second Division side Alloa Athletic. After returning for Alloa, he was sent out on loan again, this time to the Wasps rivals Stirling Albion.

Writing in world football magazine Inside Futbol in March 2010, Russell called for the Scottish Premier League to look at an 18 team top division in order to "move forward to keep fans interested". On 20 April 2010, Russell scored the winner in a 2–1 victory over Clyde to relegate the Bully Wee. Despite his contribution to the championship win, Russell did not play enough games to win a Championship medal, but manager Allan Moore gave him his medal in gratitude for his efforts.

After his manager at Stirling, took over at Cappielow, Russell was offered a year's extension to his deal which had run out in May 2010. Russell declined the offer.

=== Livingston ===
Russell signed a two-year deal with Livingston in June 2010 Russell signed a one-year contract extension with Livingston in May 2012. Russell left Livingston in May 2013 after the end of his contract. In his 3 years at the club he made 93 league appearances and scored 44 goals.

=== Queen of the South ===
Russell signed for Queen of the South on 21 May 2013. Queens ended the season in fourth place in the Scottish football second tier for a first ever taste of play off football. Queens were eliminated 4-3 after extra time in the second leg away at Falkirk. Queens finished in the fourth place play off place again in 2014/15. League opposition included Hibs, Rangers and the season's runaway divisional winners, Hearts. Hibs and Rangers were both beaten twice by Queens. The 3-0 home win v Rangers was the best of the bunch. Rangers brought Queens` play off campaign to an end with a 3-2 aggregate QoS defeat. Russell spent three seasons with the Dumfries side making over 100 first team appearances.

=== Airdrieonians ===
Russell next signed for Airdrieonians on 21 May 2016. Russell is the grandson of Airdrie legend and Honorary President Ian McMillan. During his one season at the Diamonds, Russell scored a hat-trick of penalties on 22 October 2016, in a 4-1 win over Queen's Park. Russell's three penalties were scored in the 9th, 28th and 74th minutes respectively.

=== Dumbarton (second spell) ===
After announcing his retirement in June 2017, Russell reconsidered his decision and signed a deal with part-time Scottish Championship club Dumbarton on 12 January 2018 until the end of the 2017-18 season, having previously played with the Sons from 2003 until 2006.

On 23 January 2018, Russell scored the winning goal on his first start following his return to the club, in a 3-2 Scottish Cup fourth round win away to Peterhead. After scoring twice as a trialist in pre-season with the Sons, he signed a new one-year deal in July 2018.

=== Pollok ===
On 21 June 2019, Russell put pen to paper for Pollok on what was to be his first experience of the Junior Game.

On 17 July 2019 He made his first appearance for the club in a friendly against rivals Arthurlie.

Russell was loaned to Cowdenbeath in the autumn of 2020. He made his debut for Cowden in a League Cup match against Raith Rovers on 14 November.

Cowdenbeath

On 19 December 2020, Russell scored his two hundredth career goal against Brechin in a two nil victory for the Blue Brazil.

== Personal life ==
Russell has a son, Alfie.

In 2014, he revealed he encountered mental health issues during his time at Livingston.

== Career statistics ==
Appearances and goals by club, season and competition
| Club | Season | League | | | Scottish Cup | | Scottish League Cup | | Other | | Total | |
| Club | Season | Division | Apps | Goals | Apps | Goals | Apps | Goals | Apps | Goals | Apps | Goals |
|---|---|---|---|---|---|---|---|---|---|---|---|---|
| Motherwell | 2002–03 | Scottish Premier League | 5 | 0 | 0 | 0 | 0 | 0 | — | | 5 | 0 |
| Dumbarton (loan) | 2002–03 | Scottish Second Division | 11 | 3 | — | | — | | — | | 11 | 3 |
| Dumbarton | 2003–04 | Scottish Second Division | 31 | 9 | 0 | 0 | 1 | 0 | 1 (Note: Appearances in the Scottish Challenge Cup) | 0 | 33 | 9 |
| Dumbarton | 2004–05 | Scottish Second Division | 31 | 11 | 3 | 1 | 1 | 1 | 1 | 0 | 36 | 13 |
| Dumbarton | 2005–06 | Scottish Second Division | 30 | 8 | 1 | 1 | 1 | 0 | 1 | 0 | 33 | 9 |
| Dumbarton | Total | | 92 | 28 | 4 | 2 | 3 | 1 | 3 | 0 | 102 | 31 |
| Brechin City | 2006–07 | Scottish Second Division | 32 | 21 | 3 | 1 | 1 | 0 | 3 (Note: One appearance in the Scottish Challenge Cup, two appearances and a goal in the First Division play-offs) | 1 | 39 | 23 |
| Brechin City | 2007–08 | Scottish Second Division | 4 | 4 | 0 | 0 | 1 | 0 | 1 | 2 | 6 | 6 |
| Brechin City | Total | | 36 | 25 | 3 | 1 | 2 | 0 | 4 | 3 | 45 | 29 |
| Greenock Morton | 2007–08 | Scottish First Division | 30 | 8 | 4 | 1 | — | | — | | 34 | 9 |
| Greenock Morton | 2008–09 | Scottish First Division | 25 | 3 | 1 | 0 | 3 | 4 | 2 | 0 | 31 | 7 |
| Greenock Morton | 2009–10 | Scottish First Division | 5 | 0 | 0 | 0 | 0 | 0 | 1 | 0 | 6 | 0 |
| Greenock Morton | Total | | 60 | 11 | 5 | 1 | 3 | 4 | 3 | 0 | 71 | 16 |
| Alloa Athletic (loan) | 2009–10 | Scottish Second Division | 6 | 1 | 0 | 0 | 0 | 0 | — | | 6 | 1 |
| Stirling Albion (loan) | 2009–10 | Scottish Second Division | 10 | 7 | 0 | 0 | 0 | 0 | — | | 10 | 7 |
| Livingston | 2010–11 | Scottish Second Division | 34 | 21 | 0 | 0 | 0 | 0 | 0 | 0 | 34 | 21 |
| Livingston | 2011–12 | Scottish First Division | 26 | 8 | 1 | 0 | 1 | 2 | 3 | 2 | 31 | 12 |
| Livingston | 2012–13 | Scottish First Division | 33 | 15 | 0 | 0 | 3 | 3 | 0 | 0 | 36 | 18 |
| Livingston | Total | | 93 | 44 | 1 | 0 | 4 | 5 | 3 | 2 | 101 | 51 |
| Queen of the South | 2013–14 | Scottish Championship | 34 | 13 | 3 | 1 | 3 | 0 | 3 (Note: One appearance in the Scottish Challenge Cup and two in the Premiership play-offs) | 0 | 43 | 14 |
| Queen of the South | 2014–15 | Scottish Championship | 32 | 8 | 3 | 1 | 2 | 3 | 3 (Note: One appearance and a goal in the Scottish Challenge Cup; two appearances in the Premiership play-offs) | 1 | 40 | 13 |
| Queen of the South | 2015–16 | Scottish Championship | 31 | 11 | 1 | 0 | 2 | 0 | 1 | 0 | 35 | 11 |
| Queen of the South | Total | | 97 | 32 | 7 | 2 | 7 | 3 | 7 | 1 | 118 | 38 |
| Airdrieonians | 2016–17 | Scottish League One | 32 | 18 | 1 | 0 | 4 | 1 | 4 (Note: Two appearances and a goal in the Scottish Challenge Cup; two appearances in the Championship play-offs) | 1 | 41 | 20 |
| Dumbarton | 2017–18 | Scottish Championship | 7 | 0 | 2 | 1 | — | | 5 | 0 | 14 | 1 |
| Dumbarton | 2018–19 | Scottish League One | 16 | 1 | 0 | 0 | 3 | 0 | 2 | 1 | 21 | 2 |
| Dumbarton | Total | | 23 | 1 | 2 | 1 | 3 | 0 | 7 | 1 | 35 | 3 |
| Cowdenbeath (loan) | 2020–21 | Scottish League Two | 14 | 2 | 1 | 0 | 1 | 0 | 0 | 0 | 16 | 2 |
| Career total | | | 479 | 172 | 24 | 7 | 27 | 14 | 31 | 8 | 561 | 201 |

== Honours ==
Stirling Albion

- Scottish Football League Second Division, 2009–10

Livingston

- Scottish Football League Second Division, 2010–11

== See also ==
- Greenock Morton F.C. season 2008-09 | 09-10
