= Jack Downie (footballer) =

Scottish footballer (born 1994)

Personal information
- Full name: Jack Downie
- Date of birth: 23 March 1994 (age 32)
- Place of birth: Scotland
- Position: Attacking midfielder

Youth career
- –2011: Craigroyston
- 2011–2012: Livingston

Senior career*
Years	Team	Apps	(Gls)
2012–2014	Livingston	4	(0)
2014-2017	Berwick Rangers	1	(0)
2017	Civil Service Strollers		
- * Club domestic league appearances and goals as of 10 Jun 2014

Jack Downie (born 23 March 1994) is a Scottish professional footballer who is currently without a club.

== Career ==
=== Livingston ===
A member of Livingston's under-19 squad, Downie was promoted to the first team on 3 March 2012, where he was an unused substitute in their defeat to Dundee. He was an unused substitute on one further occasion, before making his debut aged 18, as a substitute on 5 May 2012 in a 1–0 defeat against Dundee. On 4 February 2014, Downie left Livingston.

=== Berwick Rangers ===
On 24 February 2014, Downie signed for Berwick Rangers until the end of the 2013–14 season after he'd previously played one match for the club as a trialist.

== Career statistics ==
As of 24 February 2014

Appearances and goals by club, season and competition
Club	Season	League		FA Cup		League Cup		Other		Total	
Club	Season	Apps	Goals	Apps	Goals	Apps	Goals	Apps	Goals	Apps	Goals
Livingston	2011–12	1	0	0	0	0	0	0	0	1	0
Livingston	2012–13	3	0	0	0	1	0	1	0	5	0
Livingston	2013–14	0	0	0	0	1	0	0	0	1	0
Livingston	Total	4	0	0	0	2	0	1	0	7	0
Berwick Rangers	2013–14	1	0	0	0	0	0	0	0	1	0
Career total		5	0	0	0	2	0	1	0	8	0
