= Keaghan Jacobs =

South African soccer player (born 1989)

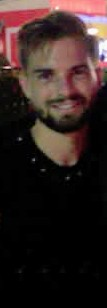

Personal information
- Date of birth: 9 September 1989 (age 37)
- Place of birth: Johannesburg, South Africa
- Height: 5 ft 9 in (1.75 m)
- Position: Midfielder

Team information
- Current team: Gala Fairydean Rovers

Youth career
- 2006–2007: Livingston

Senior career*
Years	Team	Apps	(Gls)
2007–2015	Livingston	171	(29)
2015–2016	Bidvest Wits	1	(0)
2017–2022	Livingston	148	(4)
2022	→ Falkirk (loan)	12	(0)
2022–2024	Arbroath	27	(0)
2024–	Gala Fairydean Rovers	30	(6)
- * Club domestic league appearances and goals as of 14 December 2024

Keaghan Jacobs (born 9 September 1989) is a South African professional soccer player who plays as a midfielder for Scottish club Gala Fairydean Rovers, having previously had two spells at Livingston, a short spell with Bidvest Wits, and a loan to Falkirk before going on to Arbroath for two seasons.

== Club career ==
=== Livingston ===
A product of Livingston's youth system, Jacobs made a scoring debut for the first-team on 24 November 2007 in a 4–0 home win against Alloa Athletic in the Scottish Cup. He made his first league appearance on 1 December 2007 in a 2–2 draw against Greenock Morton. He made five more appearances in the 2007–08 season. The following season, he gained more first-team experience, making 17 appearances largely as a substitute.

Although born in South Africa, Jacobs was eligible to play for Scotland through residency eligibility rules. He was considered for selection by the Scotland U21 team, but never played for them.

Jacobs remained with Livingston following their financial difficulties and subsequent demotion to the Scottish Third Division. In December 2009, he signed a new contract with the club keeping him at Almondvale until the summer of 2012. He played a key role in helping the club win back to back Third and Second division championships on their ascent back to the Scottish First Division. On 19 April 2012, Jacobs signed a new two-year contract with the club.

=== Bidvest Wits ===
On 10 July 2015, Jacobs signed for Premier Soccer League club Bidvest Wits. He left the Clever Boys in July 2016, after just one year with the club.

=== Livingston return ===
After 17 months away from the club, Jacobs returned to Livingston, then in Scottish League One, signing a deal until the end of the 2016–17 season.

On 3 September 2017, in Livingston's match against The New Saints in the Scottish Challenge Cup, Jacobs made his 220th appearance for the club becoming their record appearance holder passing the previous total set by Liam Fox. In April 2018, he signed a new contract with Livingston which also included a testimonial. In the 2017–18 Scottish Premiership play-offs Jacobs scored in both legs of the final as Livingston defeated Partick Thistle 3–1 on aggregate to gain promotion to the Scottish Premiership.

On 6 October 2018, Jacobs scored an equalising goal for Livingston in a draw against Motherwell and in doing so became the first player to score in all four divisions of Scottish football for Livingston. On 22 March 2019, he signed a new three-year contract at Livingston.

On 13 October 2019, Jacobs was rewarded for his time at Livingston with a testimonial match as the club's current side faced a team of Livingston 'legends', including his three brothers.

=== Falkirk (loan) ===
On 29 January 2022, Jacobs joined Scottish League One side Falkirk on loan until the end of the season.

=== Arbroath ===
On 25 May 2022, following the end of his contract at Livingston Jacobs joined Scottish Championship side Arbroath

=== Gala Fairydean Rovers ===
Jacobs signed a pre-contract agreement with Gala Fairydean Rovers in May 2024.

== Personal life ==
Jacobs was also a decent cricketer, having played for West Lothian County Cricket Club and Fauldhouse Cricket Club; he also represented Scotland at under-13 and under-15 levels before deciding to make a career in football.

He has a set of triplet brothers, Devon, Sheldon and Kyle who all played for Livingston. On 27 April 2010, all four brothers played together in a Scottish Third Division match against Albion Rovers. This is believed to be the only occasion in professional football where four brothers have been on the field, playing for the same team.

== Career statistics ==
As of match played 14 August 2021

Appearances and goals by club, season and competition
Club	Season	League			National Cup		League Cup		Other		Total	
Club	Season	Division	Apps	Goals	Apps	Goals	Apps	Goals	Apps	Goals	Apps	Goals
Livingston	2007–08	Scottish First Division	6	0	2	1	0	0	0	0	8	1
Livingston	2008–09	Scottish First Division	14	0	1	0	1	0	2 (Note: Appearances in the Scottish Challenge Cup)	0	18	0
Livingston	2009–10	Scottish Third Division (Note: Livingston were demoted to the Third Division after entering administration)	34	6	3	1	1	0	1	0	39	7
Livingston	2010–11	Scottish Second Division	27	4	0	0	1	0	1	0	29	4
Livingston	2011–12	Scottish First Division	31	4	2	0	2	1	3	0	38	5
Livingston	2012–13	Scottish First Division	11	3	1	0	1	0	1	0	14	3
Livingston	2013–14	Scottish Championship	32	4	1	0	1	0	0	0	34	4
Livingston	2014–15	Scottish Championship	32	1	1	1	2	0	4	0	39	2
Livingston	Total		187	22	11	3	9	1	12	0	219	26
Bidvest Wits	2015–16	South African Premier Division	1	0	0	0	0	0	0	0	1	0
Livingston	2016–17	Scottish League One	4	0	0	0	0	0	0	0	4	0
Livingston	2017–18	Scottish Championship	20	0	1	0	6	1	5 (Note: One appearance in the Scottish Challenge Cup; Four appearances and two goals in the Scottish Premiership play-offs)	2	32	3
Livingston	2018–19	Scottish Premiership	31	1	1	0	1	0	1 (Note: Appearance as an over-age player for Livingston under-21s in the Scottish Challenge Cup in which age-restricted teams from the Scottish Premiership clubs compete against senior clubs)	0	34	1
Livingston	2019–20	Scottish Premiership	24	0	1	0	4	0	0	0	29	0
Livingston	2020–21	Scottish Premiership	0	0	0	0	0	0	0	0	0	0
Livingston	2021–22	Scottish Premiership	0	0	0	0	1	0	0	0	1	0
Livingston	Total		79	1	3	0	12	1	6	2	100	4
Falkirk (loan)	2021–22	Scottish League One	0	0	0	0	0	0	0	0	0	0
Career total			267	23	14	3	21	2	18	2	320	30

== Honours ==
Livingston

- Scottish Third Division: 2009–10
- Scottish Second Division: 2010–11
- Scottish Challenge Cup: 2014–15

Individual

- Scottish Football League Young Player of the Month: November 2009
