= Mark McNulty (footballer) =

Irish footballer

Personal information
- Date of birth: 13 October 1980 (age 46)
- Place of birth: Cork, Ireland
- Position: Goalkeeper

Youth career
- –2001: Ballincollig
- 2001–2003: Cobh Ramblers
- 2003–2005: Cork City

Senior career*
Years	Team	Apps	(Gls)
2005–2022	Cork City	481	(0)
- * Club domestic league appearances and goals as of 30 November 2022 (UTC)

Mark McNulty (born 13 October 1980) is a former domestic Irish footballer who notably played for Cork City as a goalkeeper.

== Career ==
=== Early career ===
McNulty originally played as a striker for his local side Ballincollig A.F.C. before converting to a goalkeeper. In 2001, he moved to League of Ireland First Division side Cobh Ramblers, spending two years at St. Colman's Park.

=== Cork City ===
McNulty moved to Cork City in 2003, initially playing for the club's under-21 side in the Eircom U21 League. In 2005, he was promoted to the first team and made 3 appearances in the league, as City won the league title. McNulty made a further 24 league appearances over the next 4 seasons. In 2010, as Cork City were relegated to the First Division due to financial issues, McNulty established himself as City's starting goalkeeper, making 33 league appearances that season, as City finished in 6th place. He made 29 league appearances in 2011, as City secured promotion back to the Premier Division by winning the league. McNulty continued as City's first choice keeper, missing just 5 league matches in 2012 and 2013. Ahead of the 2014 season, John Caulfield was appointed as Cork City's manager. McNulty made 33 league appearances that season as City finished 2nd in the league to Dundalk. He played in all of Cork City's league matches over the next two seasons, as City finished 2nd to Dundalk on both occasions. McNulty also started the 2015 FAI Cup Final as City were beaten 1–0 after extra time thanks to a goal from Richie Towell. In the 2016 FAI Cup Final, McNulty again started the final, and was on the winning side this time, as Sean Maguire's goal in the last minute of extra time secured a 1–0 win for City. In 2017, McNulty played in all but one of City's league matches, as City won the league title. In the third successive cup final between Cork City and Dundalk, McNulty started the final and saved a penalty from Michael Duffy in a penalty shootout that City eventually won 5–3, after the match finished 1–1 after extra time, to secure a league and cup double for the first time in City's history. He played his final match for City on the 21st of October 2022 after a 17-year career at the club. Most notably, he ran the pitch twice against Paris Saint German and scored both times, before missing the crucial decider on penalties.
