= Dean Cummings =

Scottish footballer

Personal information
- Date of birth: 30 March 1993 (age 33)
- Place of birth: Edinburgh, Scotland
- Position: Midfielder

Team information
- Current team: Sorrento FC
- Number: 17

Youth career
- –2008: Falkirk
- 2008–2011: Livingston

Senior career*
Years	Team	Apps	(Gls)
2011–2015	Livingston	11	(1)
2015–2016	Lothian Thistle Hutchison Vale		
2016–2017	Edinburgh City	21	(0)
2017–2018	Lothian Thistle Hutchison Vale		
2018–2019	Stirling Macedonia	39	(8)
2020	Bayswater City	9	(0)
2021–	Sorrento FC	85	(52)
- * Club domestic league appearances and goals as of 23 November 2023

Dean Cummings (born 30 March 1993) is a Scottish professional footballer who plays as a midfielder for Lothian Thistle Hutchison Vale. Cummings has previously played for Falkirk, Livingston, Tynecastle and Edinburgh City.

== Career ==
Cummings Joined Livingston in July 2008 from Falkirk becoming a member of Livingston's under 19 squad. The youth side reached the 2010 SFL Youth Cup final with Cummings scoring the opening goal with the match resulting in a 2–1 defeat to Partick Thistle. During the tournament Cummings helped set a club record by scoring four goals in a 14–0 victory against Ayr United.

The following year the under-19 side won the league securing the title with a 10–0 victory against Stranaer. He signed a new two-year contract in April 2011 extending his stay until May 2013 and made his first team debut on 12 November 2011 as a substitute against Hamilton Academical. On 25 February 2012, he scored his first goal for the club in a 3–1 defeat to Ayr United.

After spells with Tynecastle and Lothian Thistle Hutchison Vale, Cummings signed for recently promoted Scottish League Two side Edinburgh City in June 2016. Cummings spent a season with Edinburgh City, before returning to Lothian Thistle for the 2017–18 season.

== Career statistics ==
As of 11 March 2012

Club statistics
Club	Season	League		Scottish Cup		League Cup		Other		Total	
Club	Season	App	Goals	App	Goals	App	Goals	App	Goals	App	Goals
Livingston	2011–12 season	6	1	0	0	0	0	0	0	6	1
Total		6	1	0	0	0	0	0	0	6	1

== Personal life ==
Dean is the older brother of fellow professional footballer, Jason Cummings, who, like his brother also played for Lothian Thistle Hutchison Vale.
