= Mike Mampuya =

Congolese footballer

Personal information
- Full name: Mike Mampuya-Mawawu Willems
- Date of birth: 17 January 1983 (age 43)
- Place of birth: Verviers, Belgium
- Height: 5 ft 7 in (1.70 m)
- Position: Right back

Youth career
- Anderlecht

Senior career*
Years	Team	Apps	(Gls)
2002–2003	K.R.C. Genk	0	(0)
2003–2004	KSK Heusden-Zolder	10	(0)
2004–2005	K.S.K. Tongeren	25	(9)
2005–2006	KFC VW Hamme	23	(3)
2006	Lierse S.K.	10	(0)
2007	Helmond Sport	16	(0)
2007–2009	VVV-Venlo	52	(0)
2009–2010	Helmond Sport	26	(1)
2010–2011	Doxa Katokopia	25	(0)
2011–2012	Enosis Neon Paralimni	20	(0)
2013–2014	Livingston	15	(0)
2014-2016	Broxburn Athletic		

International career^{‡}
2011	DR Congo	1	(0)
- * Club domestic league appearances and goals as of 19 May 2014 ‡ National team caps and goals as of 9 February 2011

Mike "Moussa" Mampuya-Mawawu Willems (born 17 January 1983) is a former professional footballer, who played as a right back. Born in Belgium, he represented the DR Congo national team.

== Club career ==
After a career playing in Belgium, the Netherlands and Cyprus, Mampuya moved to Scotland in June 2013 and signed for Scottish First Division club Livingston on a one-year contract. He made his competitive debut for Livingston in a Scottish Challenge Cup match against Berwick Rangers on 27 July 2013. He was released in May 2014.

After leaving Livingston, Mampuya played for Broxburn Athletic between 2014-2016.

== International career ==
On 9 February 2011, he made an appearance for the Congo DR national football team in an international friendly match against Gabon national football team.
