= Andrew Russell (footballer) =

Scottish footballer

Andy Russell
Personal information
- Full name: Andrew Russell
- Date of birth: 30 March 1993 (age 33)
- Place of birth: Scotland
- Position: Striker

Youth career
- –2009: Clyde
- 2009–2011: Livingston

Senior career*
Years	Team	Apps	(Gls)
2011–2013	Livingston	8	(0)
2012–2013	→ Bathgate Thistle (loan)	0	(0)
2013–2014	Cowdenbeath	12	(0)
2014–2016	Berwick Rangers	48	(11)
2016–2017	East Stirlingshire	1	(0)
- * Club domestic league appearances and goals as of 18:30, 31 January 2016 (UTC)

Andrew Russell (born 30 March 1993) is a Scottish footballer.

He has previously played for Livingston, Cowdenbeath, Berwick Rangers, East Stirlingshire and Bathgate Thistle on loan.

== Career ==
=== Livingston ===
A member of Livingston's under 19 squad Russell made his first team debut on 5 November 2011 against Falkirk in the Scottish First Division. During the 2012–13 season, he spent time on loan at Bathgate Thistle. Russell left Livingston in May 2013.

=== Cowdenbeath ===
On 6 July 2013, Russell signed for Cowdenbeath. During his time at the club he played 16 times, but failed to score.

=== Berwick Rangers ===
After being released by Cowdenbeath, Russell signed for Scottish League Two club Berwick Rangers. On 12 April 2014, he scored his first senior career goal in Berwick's 3–1 win against Elgin City. Russell was released by Berwick in January 2016, having only made 12 appearances for the side during the 2015–16 season.

=== East Stirlingshire ===
After leaving Shielfield Park, Russell signed for Scottish League Two relegation rivals East Stirlingshire until the end of the season, with his first match for the side coming in a 3–0 home defeat to Arbroath.

== Career statistics ==
As of 14 April 2014

Club statistics
Club	Season	League		Scottish Cup		League Cup		Other		Total	
Club	Season	App	Goals	App	Goals	App	Goals	App	Goals	App	Goals
Livingston F.C.	2011–12	8	0	0	0	0	0	0	0	8	0
Livingston F.C.	2012–13	0	0	0	0	0	0	0	0	0	0
Bathgate Thistle	2012–13	19	72	0	0	0	0	0	0	19	72
Cowdenbeath	2013–14	12	0	1	0	2	0	1	0	16	0
Berwick Rangers	2013–14	8	1	0	0	0	0	0	0	8	1
Total		47	73	1	0	2	0	1	0	32	1
