= Jack Beaumont (footballer) =

Scottish footballer

Personal information
- Date of birth: 12 September 1994 (age 32)
- Place of birth: Edinburgh, Scotland
- Position: Midfielder

Youth career
- Hutchison Vale BC
- 2010–2011: Livingston

Senior career*
Years	Team	Apps	(Gls)
2011–2015	Livingston	8	(0)
2015–2016	Cowdenbeath	11	(1)
2016–2017	Linlithgow Rose		
2017–2020	Pumpherston Juniors		
2020–2021	Tynecastle		
2021–2023	Gala Fairydean		
- * Club domestic league appearances and goals as of 11:12, 27 July 2016-2017 (UTC)

Jack Beaumont (born 12 September 1994) is a Scottish professional footballer, who used to play for Livingston and Cowdenbeath has retired from football.

== Career ==
Beaumont was a youth player at Hutchison Vale Boys Club, before joining Livingston at youth level in 2010. A member of Livingston's under 19 squad, Beaumont was promoted to the first-team on 29 October 2011, where he was an unused substitute in their win over Queen of the South. He was an unused substitute on one further occasion, before making his debut aged 17, as a substitute on 10 April 2012 in a 3–0 win over Raith Rovers. His next appearance came the following season on 4 August 2012 as a substitute in an 8–0 demolition of Stranraer in the Scottish League Cup.

In June 2015 after five years with Livingston, Beaumont moved to Scottish League One side Cowdenbeath. He signed for East Superleague club Linlithgow Rose in July 2016, but was released by Linlithgow after just 12 months.

Beaumont signed for Gala Fairydean in 2021.

== Career statistics ==
As of 5 May 2013

Club	Season	League		FA Cup		League Cup		Other		Total	
Club	Season	Apps	Goals	Apps	Goals	Apps	Goals	Apps	Goals	Apps	Goals
Livingston	2011–12	2	0	0	0	0	0	0	0	2	0
Livingston	2012–13	0	0	0	0	1	0	1	0	2	0
Livingston	Total	2	0	0	0	1	0	1	0	4	0
Career total		2	0	0	0	1	0	1	0	4	0
