= Kyle Jacobs (soccer, born 1991) =

South African soccer player (born 1991)

Personal information
- Date of birth: 14 June 1991 (age 35)
- Place of birth: Johannesburg, South Africa
- Height: 5 ft 10 in (1.78 m)
- Position: Midfielder

Team information
- Current team: Stenhousemuir
- Number: 20

Youth career
- 2008–2009: Livingston

Senior career*
Years	Team	Apps	(Gls)
2009–2013	Livingston	97	(7)
2013–2014	Kilmarnock	5	(0)
2014–2015	Livingston	47	(3)
2015–2019	Queen of the South	124	(4)
2019–2022	Greenock Morton	40	(4)
2022	→ Edinburgh City (loan)	29	(1)
2023–2024	Edinburgh City	11	(0)
2024–2025	Stenhousemuir	23	(0)
- * Club domestic league appearances and goals as of 21 December 2024

Kyle Jacobs (born 14 June 1991) is a South African professional soccer player who plays as a midfielder for Scottish Championship club Stenhousemuir. Jacobs has previously played for Livingston, Kilmarnock, Queen of the South and Greenock Morton, and Edinburgh City.

== Career ==
=== Livingston ===
After progressing through the youth system at Livingston, Jacobs made his first-team debut as a second-half substitute versus Dundee on 21 February 2009. He appeared in 97 league matches for Livingston before he left the club at the end of the 2012–13 season.

=== Kilmarnock ===
At the age of 22, Jacobs signed a six-month contract with Kilmarnock in August 2013. After making five league appearances, he was released by Kilmarnock in January 2014. Jacobs then returned to Livingston on an eighteen-month contract later that month.

=== Queen of the South ===
Jacobs signed for Queens at the start of the 2015–16 season. In February 2017, Jacobs signed a two-year contract extension until May 2019.

=== Greenock Morton ===
On 23 May 2019, Jacobs signed a pre-contract with Greenock Morton on a one-year deal.

== Personal life ==
On 13 July 2018, Jacobs' wife Chloe safely delivered a daughter named Lily as they became parents for the first time.

Jacobs' brother Keaghan plays for Arbroath and Kyle himself is one of seven siblings and is a triplet alongside Devon and Sheldon.

== Career statistics ==
As of 17 April 2021

Appearances and goals by club, season and competition
Club	Season	League			Scottish Cup		League Cup		Other		Total	
Club	Season	Division	Apps	Goals	Apps	Goals	Apps	Goals	Apps	Goals	Apps	Goals
Livingston	2009–10 (Note: Soccerbase has incorrectly credited 3 appearances; v Stranraer on 20 March 2010, Berwick Rangers on 17 April 2010 and East Stirlingshire on 1 May 2010.) (Note: Soccerway has incorrectly credited 3 appearances; v East Stirlingshire on 20 February 2010, East Stirlingshire on 9 March 2010 and Annan Athletic on 3 April 2010)	Scottish Third Division	14	0	3	0	0	0	0	0	17	0
Livingston	2010–11 (Note: Soccerbase has incorrectly credited an appearance v Ayr United on 19 April 2011.)	Scottish Second Division	31	3	1	0	1	0	1 (Note: Appearances in the Scottish Challenge Cup)	0	34	3
Livingston	2011–12	Scottish First Division	34	4	2	0	2	0	2	0	40	4
Livingston	2012–13	Scottish First Division	18	0	1	0	0	0	0	0	19	0
Livingston	Total		97	7	7	0	3	0	3	0	110	7
Kilmarnock	2013–14	Scottish Premiership	5	0	0	0	1	0	0	0	6	0
Livingston	2013–14	Scottish Championship	13	1	0	0	0	0	0	0	13	1
Livingston	2014–15	Scottish Championship	34	2	1	0	3	0	5	0	43	2
Livingston	Total		47	3	1	0	3	0	5	0	56	3
Queen of the South	2015–16	Scottish Championship	26	0	1	0	1	0	2	0	30	0
Queen of the South	2016–17	Scottish Championship	33	1	0	0	5	0	4	0	42	1
Queen of the South	2017–18	Scottish Championship	29	1	2	0	3	0	4	0	38	1
Queen of the South	2018–19	Scottish Championship	36	2	4	0	4	0	7 (Note: Three appearances in the Scottish Challenge Cup and four appearances in the Scottish Championship play-offs)	0	51	2
Queen of the South	Total		124	4	7	0	13	0	17	0	131	4
Greenock Morton	2019–20	Scottish Championship	24	4	3	0	5	1	1	0	33	5
Greenock Morton	2020–21	Scottish Championship	16	0	3	0	4	0	3	0	26	0
Greenock Morton	2021–22	Scottish Championship	18	1	1	0	3	0	2	0	24	1
Greenock Morton	2022–23	Scottish Championship	0	0	0	0	2	0	0	0	2	0
Greenock Morton	Total		58	5	7	0	14	1	6	0	85	6
Edinburgh City	2022–23	Scottish League One	29	1	1	0	0	0	1	0	31	1
Edinburgh City	2023–24	Scottish League One										
Career total			360	20	22	0	31	1	32	0	445	21

== Honours ==
Livingston

- Scottish Third Division: 2009–10
- Scottish Second Division: 2010–11
- Scottish Challenge Cup: 2014–15
