= Neil Hastings =

Scottish footballer

Personal information
- Full name: Neil Hastings
- Date of birth: 31 August 1991 (age 35)
- Place of birth: Scotland
- Position: Defender

Team information
- Current team: Livingston (assistant)

Senior career*
Years	Team	Apps	(Gls)
2009–2011	Livingston	3	(0)
2014–2015	Broxburn	0	(0)
2015–2018	Pumpherston	0	(0)

Managerial career
- 2019–2022: Gala Fairydean
- 2023–: Livingston (assistant)
- * Club domestic league appearances and goals as of 22:04, 8 December 2021 (UTC) ‡ National team caps and goals as of 19:51, 2 September 2017 (UTC)

Neil Hastings (born 31 August 1991) is a former Scottish professional footballer who played as a defender for Scottish Premiership side Livingston, Broxburn and Pumpherston.

== Club career ==
Hastings came through the youth academy at Livingston, making just three league appearances in two seasons as a full-time professional footballer. The first appearance coming in a 5-0 away win against Montrose on 24 April 2010.

== Managerial career ==
His first managerial job was at Gala Fairydean, but left in 2022 to become first team coach at Livingston.

He was promoted to the role of assistant manager in 2023.

== Personal life ==
Hastings has two children with his partner.
