= Christopher Malone =

Scottish footballer

Personal information
- Full name: Christopher Malone
- Date of birth: 17 March 1990 (age 36)
- Place of birth: Glasgow, Scotland
- Height: 5 ft 11 in (1.80 m)
- Position: Defender

Youth career
- Livingston Youth

Senior career*
Years	Team	Apps	(Gls)
2006–2011	Livingston	37	(0)
2011	Airdrie United	6	(0)
2012–2015	Kilbirnie Ladeside	–	(–)
2015–2016	Glenafton Athletic	4	(0)
2016-2018	Petershill		
- * Club domestic league appearances and goals as of 7 October 2015

Christopher Malone (born 17 March 1990 in Glasgow, Scotland) is a Scottish footballer who last played for Petershill.

== Honours ==
Livingston FC

- Scottish Football League Third Division: 2009/10
- Scottish Football League Second Division: 2010/11
