= 2016–17 Livingston F.C. season =

Livingston
2016–17 season
- Manager: David Hopkin
- Stadium: Almondvale Stadium
- League One: Winners
- League Cup: Group stage
- Challenge Cup: Quarter-final
- Scottish Cup: Fourth round
- Top goalscorer: League: Liam Buchanan (22); All: Liam Buchanan (27)
- Highest home attendance: 1,241 vs. Celtic Colts, Challenge Cup, 3 September 2016
- Lowest home attendance: 531 vs. Stenhousemuir, League One, 21 March 2017
- Average home league attendance: 796
Home colours	Away colours

The 2016–17 season was Livingston's first season back in Scottish League One and their first season back in the third-tier of Scottish football, having been relegated from the Scottish Championship at the end of the 2015–16 season. Livingston also competed in the Challenge Cup, League Cup and the Scottish Cup.

== Summary ==
=== Season ===
Livingston finished in first place in League One and were promoted as champions back to the Scottish Championship after only one season back in the third=tier of scottish football. On 24 October 2016, Livingston were fined £4,000 by the SPFL after their Scottish Challenge Cup tie with Crusaders, in which they were found to have fielded an ineligible player. Despite progressing to the next round, the SPFL ordered the match to be replayed in full and was held on 1 November.

== Results and fixtures ==
Win Draw Loss Postponed

=== Pre Season ===
2 July 2016	Livingston	1–5	Dunfermline Athletic	Almondvale Stadium, Livingston
15:00	Currie 64'	Report	Reilly 20', 83'; Geggan 31'; McCabe 37'; Cardle 68'

5 July 2016	Livingston	2–2	Greenock Morton	Almondvale Stadium, Livingston
19:30	Trialist 6'; Cadden 58'	Report	Tiffoney 44', 75'

12 July 2016	Livingston	1–1	St Johnstone	Almondvale Stadium, Livingston
19:30	Cadden 56'	Report	Coulson 11'

23 July 2016	Livingston	0–0	Hartlepool United	Almondvale Stadium, Livingston
19:30		Report

=== Scottish League One ===
6 August 2016 1	Livingston	5–1	Stranraer	Almondvale Stadium, Livingston
15:00	Pittman 5', 90+2'; Mullen 24'; Buchanan 72', 87' (pen.)	Report	Malcolm 55'	Attendance: 693; Referee: Bobby Madden

13 August 2016 2	Airdrieonians	2–4	Livingston	Excelsior Stadium, Airdrie
15:00	Ryan 53', 65'	Report	Mullen 13'; Buchanan 37'; Miller 58'; Mullin 90'	Attendance: 1,048; Referee: Mat Northcroft

20 August 2016 3	Livingston	4–1	Stenhousemuir	Almondvale Stadium, Livingston
15:00	Mullen 4', 49'; Pittman 23'; Longridge 78'	Report	McMenamin 90' (pen.)	Attendance: 769; Referee: Gavin Duncan

27 August 2016 4	Queen's Park	1–0	Livingston	Hampden Park, Glasgow
15:00	Malone 25'	Report		Attendance: 698; Referee: Kevin Graham

10 September 2016 5	Alloa Athletic	1–3	Livingston	Recreation Park, Alloa
15:00	Spence 65' (pen.)	Report	Pittman 24'; Buchanan 34'; Miller 39'	Attendance: 712; Referee: Craig Charleston

17 September 2016 6	Livingston	2–1	Brechin City	Almondvale Stadium, Livingston
15:00	Mullen 34'; Pittman 65'	Report	Trouten 72'	Attendance: 858; Referee: Alan Newlands

24 September 2016 7	East Fife	3–1	Livingston	Bayview Stadium, Methil
15:00	Insall 9', 34'; Kane 11'	Report	Mullin 59'	Attendance: 784; Referee: David Lowe

1 October 2016 8	Peterhead	1–2	Livingston	Balmoor, Peterhead
15:00	Kelleher 7'	Report	Mullen 25', 58'	Attendance: 569; Referee: Gavin Duncan

15 October 2016 9	Livingston	1–2	Albion Rovers	Almondvale Stadium, Livingston
15:00	Buchanan 90' (pen.)	Report	Boyd 18'; Wallace 70'	Attendance: 702; Referee: Craig Charleston

22 October 2016 10	Livingston	3–1	Alloa Athletic	Almondvale Stadium, Livingston
15:00	Miller 55'; Buchanan 62', 90'	Report	Spence 90' (pen.)	Attendance: 977; Referee: Stephen Finnie

29 October 2016 11	Brechin City	0–3	Livingston	Glebe Park, Brechin
15:00		Report	Buchanan 66'; Longridge 69'; Byrne 86'	Attendance: 517; Referee: Bobby Madden

5 November 2016 12	Livingston	3–1	East Fife	Almondvale Stadium, Livingston
15:00	Buchanan 45', 66' (pen.); Miller 49'	Report	Smith 53'	Attendance: 907; Referee: Craig Napier

19 November 2016 13	Livingston	1–2	Peterhead	Almondvale Stadium, Livingston
15:00	Buchanan 80'	Report	McIntosh 39'; Brown 74'	Attendance: 712; Referee: Greg Aitken

3 December 2016 14	Albion Rovers	0–1	Livingston	Cliftonhill, Coatbridge
15:00		Report	Cadden 89' (pen.)	Attendance: 413; Referee: David Munro

10 December 2016 15	Stranraer	1–2	Livingston	Stair Park, Stranraer
15:00	Gibson 5'	Report	Carrick 77'; De Vita 84'	Attendance: 333; Referee: Colin Steven

13 December 2016 16	Stenhousemuir	0–4	Livingston	Ochilview Park, Stenhousemuir
19:45		Report	Summers 16' (o.g.); De Vita 70'; Buchanan 81'; Carrick 90'	Attendance: 334; Referee: Kevin Graham

17 December 2016 17	Livingston	2–0	Airdrieonians	Almondvale Stadium, Livingston
15:00	Carrick 10'; Cadden 89'	Report		Attendance: 989; Referee: Steven Reid

24 December 2016 18	Livingston	1–2	Queen's Park	Almondvale Stadium, Livingston
15:00	Buchanan 40'	Report	McKernon 55' (pen.); Cummins 58'	Attendance: 819; Referee: Steven Kirkland

31 December 2016 19	East Fife	2–1	Livingston	Bayview Stadium, Methil
15:00	Insall 74'; Robinson 77'	Report	Buchanan 14'	Attendance: 661; Referee: Gavin Duncan

7 January 2017 20	Peterhead	2–3	Livingston	Balmoor, Peterhead
15:00	Riley 52'; McAllister 62'	Report	Gallagher 50'; Buchanan 53'; Byrne 79'	Attendance: 582; Referee: David Lowe

28 January 2017 21	Livingston	3–0	Brechin City	Almondvale Stadium, Livingston
15:00	Buchanan 1'; Halkett 29'; Cadden 56'	Report		Attendance: 746; Referee: Alan Newlands

4 February 2017 22	Alloa Athletic	2–2	Livingston	Recreation Park, Alloa
15:00	Kirkpatrick 25'; Mackin 86'	Report	Mullen 36'; Buchanan 48'	Attendance: 565; Referee: Kevin Graham

11 February 2017 23	Livingston	0–0	Stranraer	Almondvale Stadium, Livingston
15:00		Report		Attendance: 677; Referee: Graham Beaton

18 February 2017 24	Airdrieonians	0–4	Livingston	Excelsior Stadium, Airdrie
15:00		Report	Crighton 34'; Gorman 50' (o.g.); Mullen 78'; Cadden 81'	Attendance: 1,012; Referee: Stephen Finnie

4 March 2017 25	Queen's Park	1–1	Livingston	Hampden Park, Glasgow
15:00	Zanatta 20'	Report	Pittman 11'	Attendance: 701; Referee: Alan Newlands

7 March 2017 26	Livingston	3–0	Albion Rovers	Almondvale Stadium, Livingston
19:45	Todorov 34', 90'; Mullen 88'	Report		Attendance: 548; Referee: Nick Walsh

11 March 2017 27	Livingston	0–1	East Fife	Almondvale Stadium, Livingston
15:00		Report	Kerr 85'	Attendance: 773; Referee: Grant Irvine

18 March 2017 28	Stranraer	0–1	Livingston	Stair Park, Stranraer
15:00		Report	Buchanan 84'	Attendance: 523; Referee: Craig Napier

21 March 2017 29	Livingston	1–0	Stenhousemuir	Almondvale Stadium, Livingston
19:45	Todorov 24'	Report		Attendance: 531; Referee: Barry Cook

25 March 2017 30	Livingston	4–2	Airdrieonians	Almondvale Stadium, Livingston
15:00	Mullen 8', 62'; Gallagher 10'; Cadden 85'	Report	Conroy 34'; Ryan 90' (pen.)	Attendance: 832; Referee: Crawford Allan

1 April 2017 31	Brechin City	0–2	Livingston	Glebe Park, Brechin
15:00		Report	Buchanan 11', 59'	Attendance: 523; Referee: Scott Millar

8 April 2017 32	Livingston	2–1	Alloa Athletic	Almondvale Stadium, Livingston
15:00	Pittman 19'; Longridge 49'	Report	Mackin 67'	Attendance: 1,099; Referee: Greg Aitken

15 April 2017 33	Stenhousemuir	0–1	Livingston	Ochilview Park, Stenhousemuir
15:00		Report	Buchanan 54'	Attendance: 472; Referee: Colin Steven

22 April 2017 34	Livingston	4–0	Queen's Park	Almondvale Stadium, Livingston
15:00	Todorov 18'; Mullen 70'; Mullin 80'; Cadden 90'	Report		Attendance: 821; Referee: Grant Irvine

29 April 2017 35	Livingston	4–1	Peterhead	Almondvale Stadium, Livingston
15:00	Buchanan 12'; Pittman 21'; Mullin 42'; Mullen 81'	Report	Redman 61'	Attendance: 891; Referee: Kevin Graham

6 May 2017 36	Albion Rovers	0–2	Livingston	Cliftonhill, Coatbridge
15:00		Report	Pittman 19'; De Vita 44'	Attendance: 454; Referee: Steven Kirkland

=== Scottish League Cup ===
==== Group stage ====
Results

16 July 2016 Group stage	Livingston	2–3	St Mirren	Almondvale Stadium, Livingston
15:00	Cadden 50'; Carrick 68'	Report	Clarkson 13', 81'; Morgan 74'	Attendance: 894; Referee: Gavin Duncan

20 July 2016 Group stage	Edinburgh City	0–3	Livingston	Ainslie Park, Edinburgh
19:45		Report	Mullin 27'; Mullen 45'; Buchanan 76'	Attendance: 595; Referee: Gavin Duncan

26 July 2016 Group stage	Livingston	0–2	Ayr United	Almondvale Stadium, Livingston
19:45		Report	Murphy 19'; McGuffie 78'	Attendance: 643; Referee: David Lowe

20 July 2016 Group stage	Hamilton Academical	2–1	Livingston	New Douglas Park, Hamilton
19:45	D'Acol 22'; Longridge 55'	Report	Matthews 41' (o.g.)	Attendance: 764; Referee: Euan Anderson

==== Group G Table ====
Pos	Team	Pld	W	PW	PL	L	GF	GA	GD	Pts	Qualification	HAM	AYR	STM	LIV	EDI
1	Hamilton Academical (Q)	4	3	0	0	1	10	5	+5	9	Qualification for the Second Round	—	—	3–0	2–1	—
2	Ayr United (Q)	4	3	0	0	1	5	2	+3	9	Qualification for the Second Round	2–1	—	—	—	1–0
3	St Mirren	4	3	0	0	1	7	5	+2	9		—	1–0	—	—	3–0
4	Livingston	4	1	0	0	3	6	7	−1	3		—	0–2	2–3	—	—
5	Edinburgh City	4	0	0	0	4	2	11	−9	0		2–4	—	—	0–3	—

Source: SPFL
(Q) Qualified to the phase indicated

=== Scottish Challenge Cup ===
3 September 2016 Third round	Livingston	5–1	Celtic B	Almondvale Stadium, Livingston
15:00	Buchanan 5', 14' (pen.), 40'; Crighton 17'; Mullen 35'	Report	Hendry 43'	Attendance: 1,214; Referee: Steven Kirkland

7 October 2016	(Northern Ireland) Crusaders	Void	Livingston	Belfast, Northern Ireland
19:45	Owens 87'	SPFL	Buchanan 74'; Pittman 90+4'	Stadium: Seaview; Referee: David Morgan

1 November 2016 Fourth round	(Northern Ireland) Crusaders	0–3	Livingston	Seaview, Belfast
19:45		Report	Cadden 66'; De Vita 74'; Buchanan 89'	Referee: Nick Pratt

13 November 2016 Quarter-Final	Livingston	0–3	(Wales) The New Saints	Almondvale Stadium, Livingston
19:45		Report	Parry 36'; Saunders 58'; Quigley 70'	Attendance: 733; Referee: Raymond Change

Notes

1. A- Livingston's 2–1 win against Crusaders on Friday, 7 October was ordered to be replayed after Livingston plead guilty to a breach of SPFL rules in the original fixture. The club was fined £4,000 after they played Alan Lithgow for the full 90 minutes. Lithgow was ineligible for the match as he was still under an SFA suspension at the time.

=== Scottish Cup ===
26 November 2016 Third round	Airdrieonians	1–2	Livingston	Excelsior Stadium, Airdrie
15:00	Ryan 18'	Report	Cadden 30'; Mullen 62'	Attendance: 780; Referee: Barry Cook

21 January 2017 Fourth round	Livingston	0–1	East Fife	Almondvale Stadium, Livingston
15:00		Report	Paterson 27'	Attendance: 726; Referee: Colin Steven

== Player statistics ==
As of 6 May 2017 (UTC)

No.	Pos	Nat	Player	Total		League One		League Cup		Scottish Cup		Other	
No.	Pos	Nat	Player	Apps	Goals	Apps	Goals	Apps	Goals	Apps	Goals	Apps	Goals
1	GK	(Scotland) SCO	Liam Kelly	40	0	34+0	0	4+0	0	2+0	0	0+0	0
2	DF	(Scotland) SCO	Michael Miller	22	4	13+1	3	4+0	1	1+0	0	3+0	0
3	DF	(Scotland) SCO	Jackson Longridge	38	4	24+6	3	4+0	0	1+0	0	3+0	1
4	DF	(Scotland) SCO	Alan Lithgow	41	3	31+0	3	4+0	0	2+0	0	4+0	0
5	DF	(Scotland) SCO	Sean Crighton	42	2	29+3	1	4+0	0	2+0	0	4+0	1
6	MF	(Scotland) SCO	Shaun Byrne	39	2	26+4	2	2+1	0	2+0	0	3+1	0
7	MF	(Scotland) SCO	Josh Mullin	37	5	18+9	4	4+0	1	1+1	0	2+2	0
8	FW	(Scotland) SCO	Scott Pittman	43	10	36+0	9	1+1	0	2+0	0	3+0	1
9	FW	(Scotland) SCO	Liam Buchanan	45	27	32+4	22	2+1	1	2+0	0	3+1	4
10	FW	(Scotland) SCO	Danny Mullen	42	17	28+4	14	4+0	1	2+0	1	3+1	1
11	MF	(Scotland) SCO	Nicky Cadden	43	9	22+12	6	3+1	1	1+1	1	2+1	1
14	MF	(South Africa) RSA	Keaghan Jacobs	4	0	3+1	0	0+0	0	0+0	0	0+0	0
15	DF	(Scotland) SCO	Morgyn Neill	9	0	3+4	0	0+0	0	0+0	0	1+1	0
16	FW	(Scotland) SCO	Matthew Knox	12	1	3+5	0	0+3	0	0+0	1	1+0	0
17	MF	(Scotland) SCO	Jordan Sinclair	10	0	6+0	0	2+0	0	0+0	0	2+0	0
18	MF	(Scotland) SCO	Mark Millar	13	0	12+1	0	0+0	0	0+0	0	0+0	0
19	FW	(Scotland) SCO	Dale Carrick	20	4	4+10	3	2+1	1	0+1	0	1+1	0
20	GK	(Scotland) SCO	Gary Maley	6	0	2+0	0	0+0	0	0+0	0	4+0	0
21	MF	(Scotland) SCO	Liam Watt	15	0	2+9	0	0+2	0	0+0	0	1+1	0
22	MF	(Bulgaria) BUL	Nikolay Todorov	14	4	7+7	4	0+0	0	0+0	0	0+0	0
23	MF	(Italy) ITA	Raffaele De Vita	27	4	18+5	3	0+0	0	1+1	0	1+1	1
26	DF	(Scotland) SCO	Craig Halkett	43	1	33+0	1	4+0	0	2+0	0	4+0	0
28	MF	(Scotland) SCO	Jack Ogilvie	3	0	0+3	0	0+0	0	0+0	0	0+0	0
31	DF	(Scotland) SCO	Declan Gallagher	16	2	14+1	2	0+0	0	1+0	0	0+0	0
33	FW	(Scotland) SCO	Kyle Sampson	3	0	0+3	0	0+0	0	0+0	0	0+0	0
Players who left the club during the 2016–17 season
1	GK	(Scotland) SCO	Darren Jamieson	0	0	0+0	0	0+0	0	0+0	0	0+0	0
14	FW	(Scotland) SCO	Thomas Orr	3	0	0+1	0	0+2	0	0+0	0	0+0	0
18	FW	(Scotland) SCO	Lewis Allan	4	0	0+3	0	0+0	0	0+0	0	0+1	0

== Team statistics ==
=== League table ===
Pos	Team	Pld	W	D	L	GF	GA	GD	Pts	Promotion, qualification or relegation
1	Livingston (C, P)	36	26	3	7	80	32	+48	81	Promotion to Scottish Championship
2	Alloa Athletic	36	17	11	8	69	44	+25	62	Qualification to Championship play-offs
3	Airdrieonians	36	16	4	16	61	66	−5	52	Qualification to Championship play-offs
4	Brechin City (O, P)	36	15	5	16	43	49	−6	50	Qualification to Championship play-offs
5	East Fife	36	12	10	14	41	44	−3	46	

Updated to match(es) played on 6 May 2017. Source: Soccerway
Rules for classification: 1) Points; 2) Goal difference; 3) Number of goals scored
(C) Champions; (O) Play-off winners; (P) Promoted

=== Division summary ===
Round	1	2	3	4	5	6	7	8	9	10	11	12	13	14	15	16	17	18	19	20	21	22	23	24	25	26	27	28	29	30	31	32	33	34	35	36
Ground	H	A	H	A	A	H	A	A	H	H	A	H	H	A	A	A	H	H	A	A	H	A	H	A	A	H	H	A	H	H	A	H	A	H	H	A
Result	W	W	W	L	W	W	L	W	L	W	W	W	L	W	W	W	W	L	L	W	W	D	D	W	D	W	L	W	W	W	W	W	W	W	W	W
Position	1	2	1	3	3	3	2	3	2	3	2	1	1	1	1	1	1	1	1	1	1	1	1	1	1	1	1	1	1	1	1	1	1	1	1	1

Updated to match(es) played on 6 May 2017. Source:
A = Away; H = Home; W = Win; D = Draw; L = Loss

== Transfers ==
=== Players in ===
Player	From	Fee
(Scotland) Alan Lithgow	(Scotland) Airdrieonians	Free
(Scotland) Sean Crighton	(Scotland) Airdrieonians	Free
(Scotland) Nicky Cadden	(Scotland) Airdrieonians	Free
(Scotland) Liam Watt	(Scotland) Airdrieonians	Free
(Scotland) Jordan Sinclair	(Scotland) Hibernian	Free
(Scotland) Shaun Byrne	(Scotland) Dunfermline Athletic	Free
(Scotland) Michael Miller	(Scotland) Greenock Morton	Free
(Scotland) Thomas Orr	(Scotland) Greenock Morton	Loan
(Scotland) Dale Carrick	(Scotland) Kilmarnock	Free
(Scotland) Liam Kelly	(Scotland) Rangers	Loan
(Scotland) Lewis Allan	(Scotland) Hibernian	Loan
(Italy) Raffaele De Vita	(Scotland) Ross County	Free
(Scotland) Mark Millar	(Scotland) Queen of the South	Free
(South Africa) Keaghan Jacobs	(South Africa) Bidvest Wits	Free
(Bulgaria) Nikolay Todorov	(Scotland) Hearts	Loan

=== Players out ===
Player	To	Fee
(Scotland) Ben Gordon	(Scotland) St Mirren	Free
(Scotland) Jordyn Sheerin	(Scotland) Berwick Rangers	Free
(Scotland) Gary Glen	(Scotland) Cowdenbeath	Free
(Bulgaria) Spas Georgiev	(Bulgaria) Dunav Ruse	Free
(Scotland) Kieran Gibbons	(Scotland) East Kilbride	Free
(Scotland) Mark Fotheringham	Retired	
(Scotland) Marc McCallum	(England) Plymouth Argyle	Free
(Scotland) Darren Jamieson	(Scotland) Hamilton Academical	Free
(Scotland) Craig Sives	(Scotland) Cowdenbeath	Free
(Scotland) Morgyn Neill	(Scotland) Stranraer	Loan

== See also ==
- List of Livingston F.C. seasons
