= 2015–16 Livingston F.C. season =

Livingston
2015–16 season
- Manager: Mark Burchill (until 21 December); David Hopkin (21 January)
- Stadium: Almondvale Stadium
- Championship: 9th (relegated via play-offs)
- League Cup: Third round
- Challenge Cup: Third round
- Scottish Cup: Fourth round
- Top goalscorer: League: Liam Buchanan (11); All: Jordan White (16)
- Highest home attendance: 6,505 vs. Rangers, Championship, 21 November 2015
- Lowest home attendance: 664 vs. Clyde, League Cup, 1 August 2015
- Average home league attendance: 1,764
Home colours	Away colours

The 2015–16 season was Livingston's fifth consecutive season in the second tier of Scottish football and their third season in the Scottish Championship. Livingston also competed in the Challenge Cup, League Cup and the Scottish Cup. Livingston finished the season in ninth place and were relegated to the third-tier of Scottish football for the first time since 2011.

== Summary ==
=== Management ===
Livingston began the 2015–16 season under the management of Mark Burchill who had guided the club to safety from relegation on the final day of the previous season. On the 21 December 2015, Burchill was sacked from his position as manager and was replaced by David Hopkin who was given the role until the end of the season, however he couldn't avoid the club being relegated to League One after a 6–8 aggregate loss to Stranraer in the championship play-offs.

== Results & fixtures ==
Win Draw Loss Abandoned or Postponed

=== Pre Season ===
4 July 2015	Stenhousemuir	0–3	Livingston	Ochilview Park, Stenhousemuir
19:30		Report	Trialist 20'; Buchanan 30'; Millen 38'

8 July 2015	Stirling Albion	0–2	Livingston	Forthbank Stadium, Stirling
19:30		Report	Mullen; Hippolyte

11 July 2015	Livingston	0–0	Dunfermline Athletic	Albyn Park, Broxburn
19:30		Report

13 July 2015	Livingston	0–1	Real Sociedad	Almondvale Stadium, Livingston
19:30		Report	Zurutuza 28'

18 July 2015	Livingston	0–2	Motherwell	Almondvale Stadium, Livingston
19:30		Report	Ainsworth 59'; Watt 72'

20 July 2015	Bo'ness United	1–5	Livingston	Newtown Park, Bo'ness
19:30	Gribben 17'	Report	White 2', 23', 39'; Georgiev 19'; Currie 54'

=== Scottish Championship ===
8 August 2015 Championship	Raith Rovers	3–0	Livingston	Stark's Park
15:00	Stewart 8'; McCord 35' (pen.); Megginson 90'	BBC Report		Attendance: 1,560; Referee: Northcroft

15 August 2015 Championship	Livingston	0–1	Queen of the South	Almondvale Stadium
15:00		BBC Report	Kidd 65'	Attendance: 856; Referee: Salmond

22 August 2015 Championship	Livingston	1–2	Falkirk	Almondvale Stadium
15:00	Mullen 52'	BBC Report	Leahy 16'; Vaulks 62'	Attendance: 1,211; Referee: Dallas

29 August 2015 Championship	St Mirren	1–1	Livingston	St Mirren Park
15:00	McMullan 4'	BBC Report	Buchanan 22' (pen.)	Attendance: 3,018; Referee: McKendrick

5 September 2015 Championship	Livingston	2–4	Greenock Morton	Almondvale Stadium
15:00	Gordon (red card) 30'; White 85'; Sheerin 89'	BBC Report	McCluskey 31'; Johnstone 52'; Barr 66'; Scullion 82'	Attendance: 1,186; Referee: Anderson

12 September 2015 Championship	Rangers	3–0	Livingston	Ibrox Park
15:00	Wallace 16'; Waghorn 41'; Law 80'	BBC Report		Attendance: 44,832; Referee: Aitken

19 September 2015 Championship	Livingston	0–1	Hibernian	Almondvale Stadium
15:00		BBC Report	Henderson 50'	Attendance: 3,007; Referee: Cook

26 September 2015 Championship	Alloa Athletic	0–3	Livingston	Recreation Park
15:00		BBC Report	Buchanan 23', 78'; Sheerin 59'	Attendance: 622; Referee: Northcroft

3 October 2015 Championship	Dumbarton	2–1	Livingston	Dumbarton Football Stadium
15:00	Cawley 40'; Brophy 82'	BBC Report	Glen 44'; Hippolyte (red card) 45'	Attendance: 819; Referee: Walsh

17 October 2015 Championship	Livingston	0–1	St Mirren	Almondvale Stadium
15:00		BBC Report	Mallan 12'	Attendance: 1,199; Referee: Roberson

24 October 2015 Championship	Queen of the South	1–4	Livingston	Palmerston Park
15:00	Hilson 27'	BBC Report	Pittman 50'; White 67'; Buchanan 75', 85'	Attendance: 1,485; Referee: Walsh

31 October 2015 Championship	Livingston	3–0	Raith Rovers	Almondvale Stadium
15:00	White 6', 64'; Gallagher 61'	BBC Report		Attendance: 957

7 November 2015 Championship	Greenock Morton	1–0	Livingston	Cappielow
15:00	Johnstone 6' (pen.)	BBC Report		Attendance: 1,758; Referee: Charleston

17 November 2015 Championship	Hibernian	2–1	Livingston	Easter Road
19:45	Keatings 52', 69'	BBC Report	Sheerin 87'	Attendance: 7,801; Referee: Thomson

21 November 2015 Championship	Livingston	1–1	Rangers	Almondvale Stadium
15:00	Hippolyte 51'	BBC Report	Holt 22'	Attendance: 6,505; Referee: Salmond

12 December 2015 Championship	Livingston	0–1	Alloa Athletic	Almondvale Stadium
15:00	Glen (yellow card) 12'; Gallagher (yellow card) 89'	Report	Hill (yellow card) 59'; Crawford 64'	Attendance: 937; Referee: Brian Colvin

19 December 2015 Championship	Livingston	1–1	Dumbarton	Almondvale Stadium
15:00	Pittman 14'; White (yellow card) 43'; Gordon (yellow card) 50'	Report	Saunders 89'	Attendance: 911; Referee: Matt Northcroft

26 December 2015 Championship	St Mirren	1–4	Livingston	St Mirren Park
15:00	Mallan (yellow card) 37'; Shankland 41'; Webster (yellow card) 90'	Report	Buchanan 23' 66'; Gordon 32'; Glen 54'; Longridge (yellow card) 60'; Hippolyte (yellow card) 86'; Jordyn Sheerin (yellow card) 90+3'	Attendance: 2,952; Referee: Stephen Finnie

29 December 2015 Championship	Falkirk	2–0	Livingston	Falkirk Stadium
19:30	Miller 56' 60'; Kerr (yellow card) 65'	Report	Gibbons (yellow card) 36'	Attendance: 4,245; Referee: Don Robertson

2 January 2016 Championship	Livingston	0–2	Queen of the South	Almondvale Stadium
15:00	Gordon (yellow card) 31'; Glen (yellow card) 61'	Report	Jacobs (yellow card) 51'; Lyle 65'; Russell 77'	Attendance: 958; Referee: (Scotland) Willie Collum

16 January 2016 Championship	Rangers	4–1	Livingston	Ibrox Stadium
15:00	Wilson 8' (yellow card) 58'; Waghorn 22' (pen.) 41'; Miller 35'	Report	Gallagher (yellow card) 7'; Gordon (yellow card) 12'; White (yellow card) 32'; Buchanan 55' (yellow card) 82'	Attendance: 42,906; Referee: Craig Thomson (referee)

23 January 2016 Championship	Livingston	1–1	Falkirk	Almondvale Stadium
15:00	Buchanan 51'	Report	Kerr (yellow card) 43'; Sibbald 44'	Attendance: 1,536; Referee: George Salmond

30 January 2016 Championship	Dumbarton	1–0	Livingston	Dumbarton Football Stadium
15:00	Docherty 56'	Report	Halkett (yellow card) 16'; Cole (yellow card) 27'	Attendance: 760; Referee: Crawford Allan

13 February 2016 Championship	Livingston	0–0	Hibernian	Almondvale Stadium
17:15		Report		Attendance: 2,663; Referee: Alan Muir

20 February 2016 Championship	Raith Rovers	2–0	Livingston	Stark's Park
15:00	Robertson (yellow card) 13'; Stewart 37'; Connolly 48'	Report	Fotheringham (yellow card) 85'	Attendance: 1,617; Referee: Willie Collum

27 February 2016 Championship	Alloa Athletic	1–3	Livingston	Recreation Park
15:00	Duffy 19'	Report	Longridge 11'; White 14'; Stanton 39'; Cole (yellow card) 50'; Fotheringham (yellow card) 70'	Attendance: 619; Referee: Craig Charleston

1 March 2016 Championship	Livingston	0–0	Greenock Morton	Almondvale Stadium
19:45	Longridge (yellow card) 22'; Stanton (yellow card) 79'	Report	McManus (yellow card) 77'	Attendance: 787; Referee: Kevin Clancy

5 March 2016 Championship	Livingston	2–0	Dumbarton	Almondvale Stadium
15:00	Buchanan 29'; Gordon (yellow card) 74'; White 83'	Report	Nadé (yellow card) 65'; Buchanan (yellow card) 87'	Attendance: 828; Referee: Don Robertson

19 March 2016 Championship	Livingston	2–3	St Mirren	Almondvale Stadium
15:00	Buchanan 16'; White 83'	Report	Mallan 16'; Shankland 35' 72'	Attendance: 1,228; Referee: Crawford Allan

26 March 2016 Championship	Falkirk	1–2	Livingston	Falkirk Stadium
	Vaulks 90+1'	Report	White 76'; Statnton 90'	Attendance: 3,897; Referee: Nick Walsh

2 April 2016 Championship	Livingston	0–0	Alloa Athletic	Almondvale Stadium
15:00		Report		Attendance: 927; Referee: Alan Muir

5 April 2016 Championship	Hibernian	2–1	Livingston	Easter Road
19:45	Stokes 75'; Boyle 78'	Report	White 23'	Attendance: 7,289; Referee: Barry Cook

9 April 2016 Championship	Greenock Morton	2–1	Livingston	Cappielow
15:00	Johnstone 51'; O'Ware 82'	Report	White 23'	Attendance: 1,463; Referee: John McKendrick

23 April 2016 Championship	Queen of the South	3–1	Livingston	Palmerston Park
15:00	Lyle 60' (pen.) 69'; Oliver 79'	Report	Sam Stanton 29'	Attendance: 1,421; Referee: Mat Northcroft

26 April 2016 Championship	Livingston	1–0	Rangers	Almondvale Stadium
19:45	Halkett 45+1'	Report		Attendance: 5,021; Referee: Greg Aitken

1 May 2016 Championship	Livingston	0–1	Raith Rovers	Almondvale Stadium
15:00		Report	Connolly 50'	Attendance: 1,049; Referee: Craig Charleston

=== Championship play-off ===
4 May 2016 Semi-Final Leg 1	Stranraer	5–2	Livingston	Stair Park
19:45	McGuigan 14', 70'; Stirling 17'; Gibson 40'; Cole 81' (o.g.)	Report	White 10'; Buchanan 68'	Attendance: 589; Referee: John Beaton

7 May 2016 Semi-Final Leg 2	Livingston	4–3 (a.e.t.) (6–8 agg.)	Stranraer	Almondvale Stadium
15:00	Buchanan 18'; White 45+2'; Mullen 89'; Halkett 90+4'	Report	Cairney 50'; Dick 109'; Longworth 120'	Attendance: 1,018; Referee: Craig Thomson

=== Scottish Challenge Cup ===
25 July 2015 Round 1	Livingston	2–1	Clyde	Almondvale Stadium
15:00	Mullen 4'; Hippolyte 17'	BBC Report	Bolochoweckyj 35'	Attendance: 741; Referee: Allan

18 August 2015 Round 2	Queen of the South	0–1 (a.e.t.)	Livingston	Palmerston Park
19:45		BBC Report	White 115'	Attendance: 1,189; Referee: Graham

20 October 2015 Round 3	Rangers	1–0	Livingston	Ibrox Park
19:45	Clark 75'	BBC Report		Attendance: 17,386; Referee: Dallas

=== Scottish League Cup ===
1 August 2015 First round	Livingston	1–0 (a.e.t.)	Clyde	Almondvale Stadium
15:00	White 110'	BBC Report		Attendance: 664; Referee: McKendrick

25 August 2015 Second round	St Mirren	2–3	Livingston	St Mirren Park
17:45	Gallagher 16'; Mullan 45'	BBC Report	Buchanan 41'; Mullen 45'; Gallagher 84'	Attendance: 1,568; Referee: Colvin

22 September 2015 Third round	Livingston	0–2	Inverness Caledonian Thistle	Almondvale Stadium
19:45		BBC Report	Storey 12'; Devine 43'	Attendance: 644; Referee: Muir

=== Scottish Cup ===
28 November 2015 Round 3	Peterhead	1–3	Livingston	Balmoor
15:00	McAllister 90+1' (pen.)	BBC Report	Glen 14'; White 25', 74'	Attendance: 587; Referee: Allan

9 January 2016 Round 4	Livingston	0–1	Greenock Morton	Almondvale Stadium
15:00	Fotheringham (yellow card) 22'; White (yellow card) 69'	Report	McKee (yellow card) 63'; O'Ware 65'; Russell (yellow card) 72'; Pepper (yellow card) 90+2'	Attendance: 873; Referee: Charleston

== Player statistics ==
=== Squad ===
As of 7 May 2016 (UTC)

No.	Pos	Nat	Player	Total		Championship		League Cup		Scottish Cup		Other	
No.	Pos	Nat	Player	Apps	Goals	Apps	Goals	Apps	Goals	Apps	Goals	Apps	Goals
1	GK	(Scotland) SCO	Darren Jamieson	16	0	10+0	0	3+0	0	1+0	0	2+0	0
2	DF	(Sierra Leone) SLE	Osman Kakay	12	0	10+0	0	0+0	0	0+0	0	2+0	0
3	DF	(Scotland) SCO	Jackson Longridge	39	1	29+1	1	3+0	0	2+0	0	4+0	0
4	DF	(Scotland) SCO	Darren Cole	25	0	19+1	0	0+0	0	2+0	0	2+1	0
5	DF	(Scotland) SCO	Craig Sives	9	0	5+0	0	1+1	0	0+0	0	2+0	0
6	DF	(Scotland) SCO	Ben Gordon	35	1	28+0	1	2+0	0	2+0	0	3+0	0
7	MF	(Scotland) SCO	Scott Pittman	41	2	30+2	2	3+0	0	2+0	0	4+0	0
8	MF	(Scotland) SCO	Mark Fotheringham	17	0	14+0	0	0+0	0	1+0	0	1+1	0
9	FW	(Scotland) SCO	Jordan White	44	16	25+9	10	2+1	1	1+1	2	5+0	3
10	FW	(Scotland) SCO	Danny Mullen	26	4	12+7	1	2+0	1	1+0	0	2+2	2
12	DF	(Scotland) SCO	Craig Halkett	17	2	15+0	1	0+0	0	0+0	0	2+0	1
14	DF	(Scotland) SCO	Declan Gallagher	30	2	23+0	1	3+0	1	2+0	0	2+0	0
15	MF	(Scotland) SCO	Morgyn Neill	31	0	17+6	0	1+1	0	2+0	0	3+1	0
18	FW	(Scotland) SCO	Jordyn Sheerin	36	3	8+21	3	1+1	0	1+1	0	1+2	0
19	FW	(Scotland) SCO	Liam Buchanan	45	14	26+9	11	2+1	1	2+0	0	4+1	2
20	MF	(Scotland) SCO	Ryan Currie	12	0	1+7	0	0+1	0	0+2	0	0+1	0
21	MF	(England) ENG	Moses Duckrell	0	0	0+0	0	0+0	0	0+0	0	0+0	0
23	MF	(Scotland) SCO	Sam Stanton	16	3	12+1	3	0+0	0	1+0	0	2+0	0
26	GK	(Scotland) SCO	Marc McCallum	30	0	26+0	0	0+0	0	1+0	0	3+0	0
30	MF	(Scotland) SCO	Charlie Telfer	15	0	10+3	0	0+0	0	0+0	0	1+1	0
31	FW	(Scotland) SCO	Gary Glen	27	3	17+5	2	1+0	0	1+0	1	1+2	0
32	MF	(Scotland) SCO	Cammy Fraser	0	0	0+0	0	0+0	0	0+0	0	0+0	0
33	MF	(Scotland) SCO	Gabriel Auriemma	0	0	0+0	0	0+0	0	0+0	0	0+0	0
34	FW	(Scotland) SCO	Matthew Knox	8	0	2+5	0	0+1	0	0+0	0	0+0	0
35	MF	(Scotland) SCO	Josh Mullin	10	0	7+2	0	0+0	0	0+0	0	1+0	0
36	MF	(Scotland) SCO	Darren Smith	0	0	0+0	0	0+0	0	0+0	0	0+0	0
37	MF	(Scotland) SCO	Kieran Somerville	0	0	0+0	0	0+0	0	0+0	0	0+0	0
38	GK	(Scotland) SCO	Conor Quinn	0	0	0+0	0	0+0	0	0+0	0	0+0	0
Players who left the club during the 2015–16 season
2	DF	(Scotland) SCO	Ross Millen	14	0	7+2	0	2+1	0	0+0	0	2+0	0
8	MF	(Portugal) POR	Hugo Faria	20	0	15+3	0	0+0	0	1+0	0	1+0	0
11	MF	(England) ENG	Myles Hippolyte	23	2	11+6	1	2+0	0	0+1	0	2+1	1
12	GK	(England) ENG	Matt Gould	0	0	0+0	0	0+0	0	0+0	0	0+0	0
16	MF	(Scotland) SCO	Kieran Gibbons	23	0	15+3	0	2+0	0	1+0	0	2+0	0
17	MF	(Bulgaria) BUL	Spas Georgiev	13	0	2+6	0	1+2	0	0+0	0	1+1	0
27	FW	(Scotland) SCO	Mark Burchill	8	1	5+0	0	1+1	1	1+0	0	0+0	0

== Team statistics ==
=== League table ===
Pos	Team	Pld	W	D	L	GF	GA	GD	Pts	Promotion, qualification or relegation
6	St Mirren	36	11	9	16	44	53	−9	42	
7	Queen of the South	36	12	6	18	46	56	−10	42	
8	Dumbarton	36	10	7	19	35	66	−31	37	
9	Livingston (R)	36	8	7	21	37	51	−14	31	Qualification for the Championship play-offs
10	Alloa Athletic (R)	36	4	9	23	22	67	−45	21	Relegation to League One

Source: Soccerway
Rules for classification: 1) Points; 2) Goal difference; 3) Number of goals scored
(R) Relegated

=== Division summary ===
Round	1	2	3	4	5	6	7	8	9	10	11	12	13	14	15	16	17	18	19	20	21	22	23	24	25	26	27	28	29	30	31	32	33	34	35	36
Ground	A	H	H	A	H	A	H	A	A	H	A	H	A	A	H	H	H	A	A	H	A	H	A	H	A	A	H	H	H	A	H	H	A	A	H	H
Result	L	L	L	D	L	L	L	W	L	L	L	W	L	L	D	L	D	W	L	L	L	D	L	D	L	W	D	W	L	W	D	L	L	L	W	L
Position	10	9	10	9	10	10	10	10	9	10	10	7	7	7	7	8	8	8	8	9	9	9	9	9	9	9	9	9	9	9	9	9	9	9	9	9

Updated to match(es) played on 1 May 2016. Source:
A = Away; H = Home; W = Win; D = Draw; L = Loss

== Transfers ==
=== Players in ===
Player	From	Fee
(Scotland) Jackson Longridge	(Scotland) Stranraer	Free
(Scotland) Kieran Gibbons	(Scotland) Aberdeen	Free
(Scotland) Ben Gordon	(Scotland) Alloa Athletic	Free
(Scotland) Ross Millen	(Scotland) Dunfermline Athletic	Free
(Scotland) Liam Buchanan	(Scotland) Alloa Athletic	Free
(Bulgaria) Spas Georgiev	(Bulgaria) Dobrudzha Dobrich	Free
(Scotland) Morgyn Neill	(Scotland) Motherwell	Free
(Scotland) Jordyn Sheerin	(Scotland) Musselburgh Athletic	Free
(England) Matt Gould	(England) Cheltenham Town	Free
(Portugal) Hugo Faria	(Cyprus) Apollon Smyrnis	Free
(Scotland) Mark Fotheringham	Free agent	Free
(Scotland) Marc McCallum	(Scotland) Dundee United	Free
(Scotland) Craig Halkett	(Scotland) Rangers	Free
(Scotland) Sam Stanton	(Scotland) Hibernian	Loan
(Scotland) Charlie Telfer	(Scotland) Dundee United	Loan
(Sierra Leone) Osman Kakay	(England) Queen's Park Rangers	Loan
(Scotland) Josh Mullin	(Scotland) Albion Rovers	Undisclosed

=== Players out ===
Player	To	Fee
(Scotland) Michael McKenna	(Scotland) Berwick Rangers	Free
(Scotland) Kevin Walker	(Scotland) Berwick Rangers	Free
(England) Jason Talbot	(Scotland) Dunfermline	Free
(Scotland) Callum Fordyce	(Scotland) Dunfermline Athletic	Free
(Scotland) Shaun Rutherford	(Scotland) Queen of the South	Free
(Scotland) Burton O'Brien	(Scotland) Alloa Athletic	Free
(Scotland) Jack Beaumont	(Scotland) Cowdenbeath	Free
(South Africa) Kyle Jacobs	(Scotland) Queen of the South	Free
(England) Ibra Sekajja	(England) Braintree Town	Free
(Slovenia) Nejc Praprotnik	(Slovenia) Gorica	Free
(Scotland) Rory Boulding	Released	Free
(Scotland) Bradley Donaldson	(Scotland) Cowdenbeath	Free
(South Africa) Keaghan Jacobs	(South Africa) Bidvest Wits	Free
(England) Matt Gould	(Scotland) Stenhousemuir	Loan
(Portugal) Hugo Faria	(Scotland) Airdrieonians	Free
(Scotland) Ross Millen	(Scotland) Clyde	Free
(England) Myles Hippolyte	(Scotland) Falkirk	Undisclosed
(Scotland) Kieran Gibbons	(Scotland) Cowdenbeath	Loan
(Bulgaria) Spas Georgiev	(Scotland) Albion Rovers	Loan

== See also ==
- List of Livingston F.C. seasons
