= List of Livingston F.C. seasons =

This is a list of seasons played by Livingston F.C. in Scottish and European football. The club was first formed in Edinburgh as Ferranti Thistle in the 1940s, becoming Meadowbank Thistle and joining the Scottish Football League in 1974. The club relocated to Livingston in 1995, changing their name again and taking up residence in a new stadium in the West Lothian town.

== Seasons ==
=== As Ferranti Thistle / Meadowbank Thistle ===
Season	League		Scottish Cup	League Cup	Other	Top scorer	
Season	Division	Position	Scottish Cup	League Cup	Other	Top scorer	
1971–72	Playing in the East of Scotland Football League. Had never entered the Scottish Cup.						
1972–73	East of Scotland League	6th	Second round	N/A	Scottish Qualifying Cup (South) winners	Unknown	Unknown
1973–74 (Note: Last season as Ferranti Thistle, playing home matches at City Park, Edinburgh.)	East of Scotland League	5th	Third round	N/A	N/A	Unknown	Unknown
1974–75 (Note: First season as Meadowbank Thistle, playing home games at Meadowbank Stadium.)	Division Two	18th (Note: The teams placed 1st–6th were added to the new First Division (below a new Premier Division) with the remaining clubs making up the new Second Division.)	Did not enter	Group stage	N/A	Unknown	Unknown
1975–76	Second Division	14th	Second round	Group stage	Spring Cup; Group stage	Unknown	Unknown
1976–77	Second Division	11th	Second round	Group stage	N/A	Unknown	Unknown
1977–78	Second Division	13th	Fourth round	Second round	N/A	Unknown	Unknown
1978–79	Second Division	14th	Fourth round	Second round	N/A	Unknown	Unknown
1979–80	Second Division	12th	Third round	Second round	N/A	Unknown	Unknown
1980–81	Second Division	13th	First round	Second round	N/A	Unknown	Unknown
1981–82	Second Division	12th	Fourth round	Group stage	N/A	Unknown	Unknown
1982–83	Second Division	2nd	First round	Group stage	N/A	Unknown	Unknown
1983–84	First Division	11th	Third round	Group stage	N/A	Unknown	Unknown
1984–85	First Division	13th	Fourth round	Semi-final	N/A	Unknown	Unknown
1985–86	Second Division	3rd	Second round	Second round	N/A	Unknown	Unknown
1986–87	Second Division	1st	Fourth round	First round	N/A	Unknown	Unknown
1987–88	First Division	2nd	Third round	Third round	N/A	Unknown	Unknown
1988–89	First Division	10th	Fourth round	Third round	N/A	Unknown	Unknown
1989–90	First Division	7th	Third round	Second round	N/A	Unknown	Unknown
1990–91	First Division	11th	Fourth round	Second round	Challenge Cup; First round	Unknown	Unknown
1991–92	First Division	10th	Fourth round	Second round	Challenge Cup; First round	Unknown	Unknown
1992–93	First Division	11th	Third round	Second round	Challenge Cup; Semi-final	Unknown	Unknown
1993–94	Second Division	4th (Note: The teams placed 7th–14th were relegated to a new Third Division.)	Second round	Second round	Challenge Cup; Semi-final	Unknown	Unknown
1994–95 (Note: Last season as Meadowbank Thistle, playing home games at Meadowbank Stadium.)	Second Division	9th	Fourth round	Second round	Challenge Cup; First round	Unknown	Unknown

=== As Livingston ===
Season	League									Scottish Cup	League Cup	Challenge Cup (Note: The Scottish Challenge Cup is only open to clubs below the top tier.)	Europe		Top league goalscorer(s)	
Season	Division	P	W	D	L	F	A	Pts	Pos	Scottish Cup	League Cup	Challenge Cup	Europe		Name	Goals
1995–96 (Note: First season as Livingston, playing home games at Almondvale Stadium.)	SFL 3	36	21	9	6	51	24	72	1st	R2	R3	R1	DNQ			
1996–97	SFL 2	36	18	10	8	56	38	64	3rd	R2	R1	R1	DNQ			
1997–98	SFL 2	36	16	11	9	56	40	59	3rd	R3	R2	R2	DNQ			
1998–99	SFL 2	36	22	11	3	64	35	77	1st	R4	R3	N/A (Note: No Challenge Cup competition was held in 1998–99 due to a lack of sponsor.)	DNQ		Bingham	11
1999–00	SFL 1	36	19	7	10	60	45	64	4th	R4	R2	QF	DNQ		Bingham	15
2000–01	SFL 1	36	23	7	6	72	31	76	1st	SF	R3	Runners-up	DNQ		Wilson	13
2001–02	SPL	38	16	10	12	50	47	58	3rd	R4	QF	N/A	DNQ		Wilson	8
2002–03	SPL	38	9	8	21	48	62	35	9th	R3	QF	N/A	UEFA Cup	R1	Andrews; Wilson	4
2003–04	SPL	38	10	13	15	48	57	43	9th	SF	Winners	N/A	DNQ		Makel	8
2004–05	SPL	38	9	8	21	34	61	35	10th	QF	QF	N/A	DNQ		Easton	3
2005–06	SPL	38	4	6	28	25	79	18	12th	R3	SF	N/A	DNQ		Brittain; Snodgrass	4
2006–07	SFL 1	36	11	12	13	41	46	45	6th	R4	R3	R1	DNQ		Craig	7
2007–08	SFL 1	36	10	9	17	55	66	39	7th	R5	R2	R1	DNQ		Dorrans	11
2008–09	SFL 1	36	13	8	15	56	58	47	7th (Note: Livingston were relegated to the Third Division for breaking rules on insolvency.)	R3	R3	QF	DNQ		Griffiths	18
2009–10	SFL 3	36	24	6	6	63	25	78	1st	R4	R1	R1	DNQ		Halliday	14
2010–11	SFL 2	36	25	7	4	79	33	82	1st	R3	R1	R1	DNQ		Russell	22
2011–12	SFL 1	36	13	9	14	56	54	48	5th	R4	R2	SF	DNQ		Boulding; McNulty	11
2012–13	SFL 1	36	14	10	12	58	56	52	4th	R4	R3	R1	DNQ		Russell	15
2013–14	Championship (Note: The second tier was re-named from the Scottish Football League First Division to the SPFL Championship in 2013.)	36	13	7	16	51	56	46	6th	R4	R3	R1	DNQ		McNulty	17
2014–15	Championship	36	8	8	20	41	53	27	8th	R4	R3	Winners	DNQ		White	11
2015–16	Championship	36	8	7	21	37	51	31	9th	R4	R3	R3	DNQ		Buchanan	11
2016–17	League One	36	26	3	7	80	32	81	1st	R4	R1	QF	DNQ		Buchanan	22
2017–18	Championship	36	17	11	8	56	37	62	2nd (Note: Promoted in play-offs.)	R4	QF	R2	DNQ		Hardie	8
2018–19	Premiership	38	11	11	16	42	44	44	9th	R4	R2	N/A	DNQ		Hardie; Halkett	7
2019–20	Premiership (Note: The 2019–20 Scottish Premiership was suspended in March 2020 due to the COVID-19 pandemic in Scotland. The season was subsequently curtailed on 18 May 2020 and a points-per-game average was used to calculate a final table.)	30	10	9	11	41	39	39	5th	R5	QF	N/A	DNQ		Dykes	9
2020–21	Premiership	38	12	9	17	42	54	45	6th	R4	Runners-Up	N/A	DNQ		Pittman	7
2021–22	Premiership	38	13	10	15	41	46	49	7th	R5	R2	N/A	DNQ		Anderson	13
2022–23	Premiership	38	13	7	18	36	60	46	8th	R5	R2	N/A	DNQ		Nouble	7
2023–24	Premiership	38	5	10	23	29	70	25	12th	QF	QF	N/A	DNQ		Anderson	7
2024–25	Championship	36	20	10	6	55	27	70	2nd (Note: Promoted in play-offs.)	QF	GS	Winners	DNQ		Muirhead	13
2025–26	Premiership															

== League performance summary ==
The Scottish Football League was founded in 1890 and, other than during seven years of hiatus during World War II, (Note: The incomplete 1939–40 edition has not been counted in the totals.) the national top division has been played every season since. (Note: The top tier became the Scottish Premier League in 1998, and all four divisions became the Scottish Professional Football League in 2013.) The following is a summary of Livingston's divisional status since 1953 when they joined the East of Scotland League as Ferranti Thistle:

- 67 total eligible seasons (including 2019–20)
- 7 seasons in top level (Note: Has existed between 1890–1939, and since 1946.)
- 21 seasons in second level (Note: Has existed between 1893–1915, 1921–1939 and since 1946.)
- 17 seasons in third level (Note: Has existed between 1923–1926, 1946–1949, and since 1976.)
- 2 seasons in fourth level (Note: Has existed since 1994.)
- 20 seasons not involved – before club was league member

== Sources ==
- Soccerbase
- FitbaStats
- Football Club History Database (Ferranti Thistle)
- Football Club History Database (Meadowbank Thistle)
- Football Club History Database (Livingston)
