= 2017–18 Livingston F.C. season =

Livingston
2017–18 season
- Manager: David Hopkin
- Stadium: Almondvale Stadium
- Championship: Runners-up (Promoted via play-offs)
- League Cup: Quarter-final
- Challenge Cup: Second round
- Scottish Cup: Fourth round
- Top goalscorer: League: Ryan Hardie (8); All: Lithgow, Hardie, Mackin & Halkett (8)
- Highest home attendance: 5,469 vs. Partick Thistle, Play-off, 17 May 2018
- Lowest home attendance: 617 vs. Airdrieonians, League Cup, 22 July 2017
- Average home league attendance: 1,348
Home colours	Away colours

The 2017–18 season was Livingston's first season back in the Scottish Championship after their promotion from League One at the end of the 2016–17 season. Livingston also competed in the Challenge Cup, League Cup and the Scottish Cup.

== Summary ==
=== Season ===
Livingston finished as runners-up in the Scottish Championship and were promoted to the Scottish Premiership for the first time since 2006 with victory over Partick Thistle in the premiership play-offs. Livingston also reached the quarter-final of the League Cup, the second round of the Challenge Cup and the fourth round of the Scottish Cup.

== Results and fixtures ==
Win Draw Loss Postponed

=== Pre Season ===
1 July 2017	Livingston	0–1	Heart of Midlothian	Almondvale Stadium, Livingston
15:00		Report	Stockton 20'

4 July 2017	Livingston	0–2	Motherwell	Almondvale Stadium, Livingston
19:30		Report	Bigirimana 42'; Bowman 86'	Attendance: 824

8 July 2017	Kilmarnock	1–0	Livingston	Rugby Park, Kilmarnock
15:00	Waters 58'	Report

12 July 2017	Livingston	0–3	Sunderland	Almondvale Stadium, Livingston
19:30		Report	Khazri 20'; Asoro 76'; Lens 90'

28 July 2017	Cardiff City	4–0	Livingston	Cardiff City Stadium, Cardiff
15:00	Hoilett 12'; Ward 57', 63'; Ecuele Manga 75'	Report

=== Scottish Championship ===
5 August 2017 1	Livingston	1–1	Dunfermline Athletic	Almondvale Stadium, Livingston
15:00	Pittman 30'	Report	Higginbotham 63 pen.'	Attendance: 2,301; Referee: Alan Newlands

12 August 2017 2	Brechin City	2–2	Livingston	Glebe Park, Brechin
15:00	Orsi 54'; Graham 61'	Report	Mackin 25'; Pittman 44'	Attendance: 579; Referee: Gavin Duncan

19 August 2017 3	Livingston	1–3	St Mirren	Almondvale Stadium, Livingston
15:00	Halkett 15'	Report	Halkett 9 o.g.' Irvine (red card) 33'; Reilly 51', 60'	Attendance: 1,609; Referee: Craig Thomson

26 August 2017 4	Greenock Morton	0–1	Livingston	Cappielow, Greenock
15:00		Report	Mullen 60'	Attendance: 1,599; Referee: Euan Anderson

9 September 2017 5	Livingston	2–2	Queen of the South	Almondvale Stadium, Livingston
15:00	Mullen 40 pen.' Mackin 81'	Report	Stirling 71'; Lyle 77'	Attendance: 1,113; Referee: Steven McLean

16 September 2017 6	Inverness CT	1–3	Livingston	Caledonian Stadium, Inverness
15:00	Bell 27'	Report	Todorov 24'; Robinson 52'; Halkett 72'	Attendance: 2,007; Referee: Craig Charleston

23 September 2017 7	Falkirk	0–2	Livingston	Falkirk Stadium, Falkirk
15:00		Report	Mullen 47'; Mullin 53'; Gallagher (red card) 90+1'	Attendance: 4,091; Referee: Greg Aitken

30 September 2017 8	Livingston	2–1	Dumbarton	Almondvale Stadium, Livingston
15:00	Lithgow 19'; Halkett 85'	Report	Walsh 76'	Attendance: 938; Referee: Mat Northcroft

14 October 2017 9	Livingston	2–0	Dundee United	Almondvale Stadium, Livingston
15:00	Mullen 7'; Todorov 76'	Report		Attendance: 2,282; Referee: John Beaton

21 October 2017 10	Dunfermline Athletic	3–1	Livingston	East End Park, Dunfermline
15:00	Higginbotham 2', 38'; Aird 30'	Report	Mullen 87'	Attendance: 5,059; Referee: Andrew Dallas

28 October 2017 11	Livingston	3–2	Brechin City	Almondvale Stadium, Livingston
15:00	McMillan 3'; Halkett 60'; Mackin 69'	Report	Orsi 85 pen.'	Attendance: 926; Referee: Stephen Finnie

4 November 2017 12	Livingston	0–0	Inverness CT	Almondvale Stadium, Livingston
15:00		Report		Attendance: 1,262; Referee: Gavin Duncan

25 November 2017 13	Queen of the South	0–3	Livingston	Palmerston Park, Dumfries
15:00	Jacobs (red card) 77'	Report	Penrice 32'; Mullin 68'; Byrne 81'	Attendance: 1,328; Referee: Colin Steven

28 November 2017 14	St Mirren	3–1	Livingston	St Mirren Park, Paisley
19:45	Morgan 51'; Eckersley 66'; McShane 78 pen.'	Report	Carrick 30'	Attendance: 3,177; Referee: Gavin Duncan

19 December 2017 15	Livingston	0–0	Falkirk	Almondvale Stadium, Livingston
19:45		Report		Attendance: 1,287; Referee: Gavin Duncan

23 December 2017 16	Dundee United	3–0	Livingston	Tannadice Park, Dundee
15:00	McMullan 22', 88'; McDonald 37'	Report		Attendance: 6,221; Referee: Gavin Duncan

26 December 2017 17	Dumbarton	1–4	Livingston	Dumbarton Football Stadium, Dumbarton
14:00	Loy 25'; Hutton (red card) 90+1'	Report	Halkett 27'; Pittman 43'; Mackin 58'; Robinson 80'	Attendance: 495; Referee: Nick Walsh

2 January 2018 18	Inverness CT	1–1	Livingston	Caledonian Stadium, Inverness
15:00	Doran 6'; Vigurs (red card) 43'	Report	Lithgow 82'	Attendance: 2,239; Referee: Greg Aitken

6 January 2018 19	Livingston	0–1	Queen of the South	Almondvale Stadium, Livingston
15:00		Report	Kane 39'	Attendance: 1,006; Referee: Stephen Finnie

13 January 2018 20	Brechin City	0–2	Livingston	Glebe Park, Brechin
15:00		Report	Halkett 12 pen.' Robinson 69'	Attendance: 551; Referee: Craig Charleston

27 January 2018 21	Livingston	2–0	Dumbarton	Almondvale Stadium, Livingston
15:00	Lithgow 23'; Hardie 28'	Report		Attendance: 732; Referee: Colin Steven

3 February 2018 22	Falkirk	1–3	Livingston	Falkirk Stadium, Falkirk
15:00	Jakubiak 72'	Report	Lithgow 39'; Hardie 59'; De Vita 62'	Attendance: 4,123; Referee: John McKendrick

10 February 2018 23	Livingston	0–0	Dunfermline Athletic	Almondvale Stadium, Livingston
15:00	Thompson (red card) 69'	Report		Attendance: 1,579; Referee: Greg Aitken

17 February 2018 24	Livingston	4–1	St Mirren	Almondvale Stadium, Livingston
15:00	Hardie 9', 15'; Miller 22'; Robinson 90+4'	Report	Flynn 2'	Attendance: 2,708; Referee: Alan Muir

23 February 2018 25	Livingston	2–1	Dundee United	Almondvale Stadium, Livingston
19:45	Robinson 22'; Hardie 90+1'	Report	Smith 74'	Attendance: 1,604; Referee: Craig Thomson

27 February 2018 26	Greenock Morton	0–1	Livingston	Cappielow, Greenock
19:45		Report	Cadden 47'	Attendance: 1,373; Referee: Euan Anderson

13 March 2018 27	Livingston	1–1	Greenock Morton	Almondvale Stadium, Livingston
19:45	Byrne (red card) 66'; Longridge 90+4'	Report	Oliver 88'	Attendance: 862; Referee: Greg Aitken

17 March 2018 28	Livingston	0–0	Falkirk	Almondvale Stadium, Livingston
15:00		Report		Attendance: 1,319; Referee: Gavin Duncan

24 March 2018 29	Queen of the South	3–3	Livingston	Palmerston Park, Dumfries
19:45	Thomson 28'; Dykes 30'; Todorov 90+1'	Report	De Vita 41'; Halkett 52'; Hardie 60'	Attendance: 1,153; Referee: Steven McLean

31 March 2018 30	Dumbarton	0–3	Livingston	Dumbarton Football Stadium, Dumbarton
15:00	Wilson (red card) 80'	Report	Miller 34'; Hardie 36'; De Vita 45'	Attendance: 670; Referee: Barry Cook

3 April 2018 31	Dunfermline Athletic	1–0	Livingston	East End Park, Dunfermline
19:45	Ashcroft 11'	Report		Attendance: 4,572; Referee: Stephen Finnie

7 April 2018 32	Livingston	3–2	Greenock Morton	Almondvale Stadium, Livingston
15:00	Longridge 35'; Lithgow 53', 86'	Report	O'Ware 18'; Lamie 69'	Attendance: 1,028; Referee: Steven Kirkland

14 April 2018 33	St Mirren	0–0	Livingston	St Mirren Park, Paisley
15:00		Report		Attendance: 6,172; Referee: John Beaton

21 April 2018 34	Livingston	3–0	Brechin City	Almondvale Stadium, Livingston
15:00	Pittman 67'; Longridge 35'; Hardie 86'	Report		Attendance: 943; Referee: Steven Reid

24 April 2018 35	Livingston	0–1	Inverness CT	Almondvale Stadium, Livingston
19:45		Report	Polworth 46'	Attendance: 740; Referee: Colin Steven

28 April 2018 36	Dundee United	2–0	Livingston	Tannadice Park, Dundee
15:00	Slater 54'; McDonald 85'	Report		Attendance: 5,226; Referee: Greg Aitken

=== Premiership play-off ===
7 May 2018 Semi-Final 1st Leg	Dundee United	2–3	Livingston	Tannadice Park, Dundee
19:45	Mikkelsen 3'; Ralston 28'	Report	De Vita 2'; Mullin 77'; Pittman 80'	Attendance: 5,610; Referee: Nick Walsh

11 May 2018 Semi-Final 2nd Leg	Livingston	1–1 (4–3 agg.)	Dundee United	Almondvale Stadium, Livingston
19:45	Lithgow 6'	Report	Fraser 21'	Attendance: 4,508; Referee: Don Robertson

17 May 2018 Final 2nd Leg	Livingston	2–1	Partick Thistle	Almondvale Stadium, Livingston
19:45	Jacobs 13'; Pittman 74'	Report	Doolan 10'	Attendance: 5,469; Referee: Craig Thomson

20 May 2018 Final 2nd Leg	Partick Thistle	0–1 (1–3 agg.)	Livingston	Firhill Stadium, Glasgow
15:30		Report	Jacobs 46'	Attendance: 7,122; Referee: John Beaton

=== Scottish League Cup ===
==== Group stage ====
Results

15 July 2017 Group stage	Livingston	1–1 (3–1 p)	Partick Thistle	Almondvale Stadium, Livingston
15:00	Jacobs 46'	Report	Erskine 14'	Attendance: 1,119; Referee: Kevin Clancy

18 July 2017 Group stage	St Mirren	0–1	Livingston	St Mirren Park, Paisley
19:45		Report	Carrick 2'	Attendance: 2,104; Referee: Alan Muir

22 July 2017 Group stage	Livingston	2–0	Airdrieonians	Almondvale Stadium, Livingston
15:00	Mackin 21'; Halkett 53'	Report		Attendance: 617; Referee: Mike Roncone

25 July 2017 Group stage	Stranraer	2–4	Livingston	Stair Park, Stranraer
19:45	Neill 5'; Agnew 33 pen.'	Report	Robertson 10'; Carrick 32'; Todorov 61'; Robinson 80'	Attendance: 341; Referee: John McKendrick

==== Group H ====
Pos	Team	Pld	W	PW	PL	L	GF	GA	GD	Pts	Qualification	LIV	PAR	STM	AIR	STR
1	Livingston (Q)	4	3	1	0	0	8	3	+5	11	Qualification for the Second Round	—	p1–1	—	2–0	—
2	Partick Thistle (Q)	4	3	0	1	0	9	2	+7	10	Qualification for the Second Round	—	—	5–0	—	1–0
3	St Mirren	4	2	0	0	2	9	7	+2	6		0–1	—	—	5–0	—
4	Airdrieonians	4	1	0	0	3	4	10	−6	3		—	1–2	—	—	3–1
5	Stranraer	4	0	0	0	4	4	12	−8	0		2–4	—	1–4	—	—

Rules for classification: 1) goal difference, 2) goals scored, 3) away goals scored, 4) matches won, 5) away matches won, 6) drawing of lots.
(Q) Qualified to the phase indicated

==== Knockout stage ====
8 August 2017 Second round	Falkirk	1–2 (a.e.t.)	Livingston	Falkirk Stadium, Falkirk
19:45	Craigen 40'	Report	Robinson 32'; De Vita 101'	Attendance: 2,667; Referee: Andrew Dallas

19 September 2017 Quarter-Final	Hibernian	3–2	Livingston	Easter Road, Edinburgh
19:45	Swanson 18'; Boyle 32'; Stokes 83 pen.'	Report	Lithgow 10'; De Vita 28'	Attendance: 8,535; Referee: Bobby Madden

=== Scottish Challenge Cup ===
15 August 2017 First round	Greenock Morton	0–2	Livingston	Cappielow, Greenock
19:45		Report	Todorov 25'; Mullen 70'	Attendance: 1,036; Referee: Colin Steven

3 September 2017 Second round	(Wales) The New Saints	1–1 (6–5 p)	Livingston	Park Hall, Oswestry
19:45	Edwards 20'	Report	Mackin 64'	Attendance: 403; Referee: Robert Harvey

=== Scottish Cup ===
18 November 2017 Third round	Livingston	2–0	Glenafton Athletic	Almondvale Stadium, Livingston
15:00	Mackin 20', 61'	Report		Attendance: 735; Referee: Alan Newlands

23 January 2018 Fourth round	Livingston	0–1	Falkirk	Almondvale Stadium, Livingston
19:45		Report	Tumilty 90+3'	Attendance: 1,237; Referee: Alan Newlands

== Player statistics ==
As of 20 May 2018 (UTC)

No.	Pos	Nat	Player	Total		Championship		League Cup		Scottish Cup		Other	
No.	Pos	Nat	Player	Apps	Goals	Apps	Goals	Apps	Goals	Apps	Goals	Apps	Goals
1	GK	(Scotland) SCO	Neil Alexander	47	0	34+0	0	6+0	0	1+0	0	6+0	0
2	DF	(Scotland) SCO	Jack McMillan	15	1	3+10	1	0+0	0	1+0	0	0+1	0
3	DF	(Scotland) SCO	Jackson Longridge	45	3	23+8	3	2+4	0	2+0	0	5+1	0
4	DF	(Scotland) SCO	Alan Lithgow	47	8	33+0	6	6+0	1	2+0	0	6+0	1
5	DF	(Scotland) SCO	Gregor Buchanan	11	0	7+1	0	0+0	0	1+0	0	0+2	0
6	MF	(Scotland) SCO	Shaun Byrne	46	1	32+1	1	6+0	0	2+0	0	5+0	0
7	MF	(Scotland) SCO	Josh Mullin	41	4	20+8	3	3+3	0	1+1	0	4+1	1
8	FW	(Scotland) SCO	Scott Pittman	49	6	35+0	4	6+0	0	2+0	0	6+0	2
9	FW	(Scotland) SCO	Ryan Hardie	17	8	15+1	8	0+0	0	0+1	0	0+0	0
10	FW	(Scotland) SCO	Steven Boyd	11	0	4+6	0	0+0	0	1+0	0	0+0	0
11	MF	(Scotland) SCO	Nicky Cadden	35	1	15+11	1	2+0	0	0+1	0	2+4	0
14	MF	(South Africa) RSA	Keaghan Jacobs	32	3	13+7	0	5+1	1	1+0	0	4+1	2
15	FW	(Scotland) SCO	Dylan Mackin	21	8	7+7	4	2+2	1	1+0	2	0+2	1
16	FW	(Scotland) SCO	Matthew Knox	6	1	0+2	0	2+0	0	0+1	1	1+0	0
17	MF	(Scotland) SCO	Scott Robinson	25	7	9+8	5	1+1	2	1+0	0	4+1	0
18	FW	(Scotland) SCO	Lee Miller	21	2	13+3	2	0+0	0	0+1	0	4+0	0
19	MF	(Scotland) SCO	Adam Frizzell	4	0	2+2	0	0+0	0	0+0	0	0+0	0
20	GK	(Scotland) SCO	Gary Maley	3	0	2+0	0	0+0	0	1+0	0	0+0	0
21	MF	(Scotland) SCO	James Penrice	13	1	11+2	1	0+0	0	0+0	0	0+0	0
22	MF	(Scotland) SCO	Craig Henderson	1	0	0+0	0	0+1	0	0+0	0	0+0	0
23	MF	(Italy) ITA	Raffaele De Vita	40	6	21+9	3	5+1	2	0+0	0	3+1	1
24	MF	(Northern Ireland) NIR	Jordan Thompson	17	0	7+4	0	0+2	0	0+0	0	2+2	0
26	DF	(Scotland) SCO	Craig Halkett	49	8	34+1	7	6+0	1	2+0	0	6+0	0
29	GK	(Scotland) SCO	Jordan Pettigrew	0	0	0+0	0	0+0	0	0+0	0	0+0	0
31	DF	(Scotland) SCO	Declan Gallagher	43	0	30+1	0	5+0	0	2+0	0	5+0	0
Players who left the club during the 2017–18 season
9	MF	(Bulgaria) BUL	Nikolay Todorov	24	4	10+8	2	2+2	1	0+0	0	1+1	1
10	FW	(Scotland) SCO	Danny Mullen	17	5	11+0	4	3+1	0	0+0	0	1+1	1
19	FW	(Scotland) SCO	Dale Carrick	15	3	4+5	1	4+1	2	1+0	0	0+0	0
22	MF	(Scotland) SCO	Joe Thomson	3	0	1+1	0	0+0	0	0+0	0	1+0	0
24	FW	(Scotland) SCO	Josh Peters	2	0	0+0	0	0+2	0	0+0	0	0+0	0

== Team statistics ==
=== League table ===
Pos	Team	Pld	W	D	L	GF	GA	GD	Pts	Promotion, qualification or relegation
1	St Mirren (C, P)	36	23	5	8	63	36	+27	74	Promotion to the Premiership
2	Livingston (O, P)	36	17	11	8	56	37	+19	62	Qualification for the Premiership play-off semi-final
3	Dundee United	36	18	7	11	52	42	+10	61	Qualification for the Premiership play-off quarter-final
4	Dunfermline Athletic	36	16	11	9	60	35	+25	59	Qualification for the Premiership play-off quarter-final
5	Inverness Caledonian Thistle	36	16	9	11	53	37	+16	57	

Source: Soccerway
Rules for classification: 1) Points; 2) Goal difference; 3) Goals scored; 4) Points in head-to-head matches; 5) Goal difference in hth matches; 6). Goals scored in hth matches; 7). Play-off (only for deciding promotion, play-off participation and relegation).
(C) Champions; (O) Play-off winners; (P) Promoted

=== Division summary ===
Round	1	2	3	4	5	6	7	8	9	10	11	12	13	14	15	16	17	18	19	20	21	22	23	24	25	26	27	28	29	30	31	32	33	34	35	36
Ground	H	A	H	A	H	A	A	H	H	A	H	H	A	A	H	A	A	A	H	A	H	A	H	H	H	A	H	H	A	A	A	H	A	H	H	A
Result	D	D	L	W	D	W	W	W	W	L	W	D	W	L	D	L	W	D	L	W	W	W	D	W	W	W	D	D	D	W	L	W	D	W	L	L
Position	5	6	7	6	6	6	4	4	2	3	2	3	3	3	3	4	4	3	3	3	4	4	3	2	2	2	2	2	2	2	2	2	2	2	2	2

Updated to match(es) played on 28 April 2018. Source:
A = Away; H = Home; W = Win; D = Draw; L = Loss

== Transfers ==
=== Players in ===
Player	From	Fee
(Scotland) Scott Robinson	(Scotland) East Fife	Free
(Scotland) Josh Peters	(Scotland) Forfar Athletic	Free
(Scotland) Dylan Mackin	(Scotland) Motherwell	Free
(Bulgaria) Nikolay Todorov	(Scotland) Heart of Midlothian	Loan
(Scotland) Neil Alexander	(Scotland) Aberdeen	Free
(Scotland) Joe Thomson	(Scotland) Celtic	Loan
(Scotland) James Penrice	(Scotland) Partick Thistle	Loan
(Scotland) Jack McMillan	(Scotland) Motherwell	Loan
(Scotland) Steven Boyd	(Scotland) Hamilton Academical	Loan
(Northern Ireland) Jordan Thompson	(Scotland) Rangers	Loan
(Scotland) Gregor Buchanan	(Scotland) St Mirren	Free
(Scotland) Ryan Hardie	(Scotland) Rangers	Loan
(Scotland) Lee Miller	(Scotland) Falkirk	Free
(Scotland) Adam Frizzell	(Scotland) Kilmarnock	Loan

=== Players out ===
Player	To	Fee
(Scotland) Morgyn Neill	(Scotland) Stranraer	Free
(Scotland) Liam Buchanan	(Scotland) Raith Rovers	Free
(Scotland) Jordan Sinclair	(Scotland) Brechin City	Free
(Scotland) Sean Crighton	(Scotland) Brechin City	Free
(Scotland) Danny Mullen	(Scotland) St Mirren	Undisclosed
(Scotland) Dale Carrick	(Scotland) Airdrieonians	Free
(Scotland) Josh Peters	(Scotland) Forfar Athletic	Free
(Scotland) Dylan Mackin	(Scotland) Brechin City	Loan

== See also ==
- List of Livingston F.C. seasons
