= Dale Carrick =

Scottish footballer (born 1994)

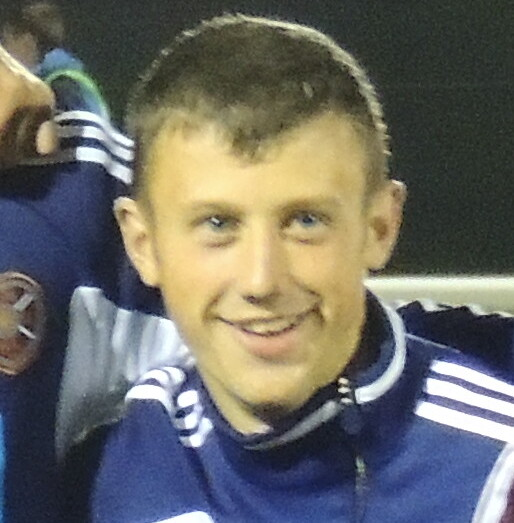
- Carrick when he was at Hearts

Personal information
- Full name: Dale Carrick
- Date of birth: 7 January 1994 (age 32)
- Place of birth: Edinburgh, Scotland
- Position: Striker

Team information
- Current team: Stenhousemuir
- Number: 15

Youth career
- 2005–2012: Heart of Midlothian

Senior career*
Years	Team	Apps	(Gls)
2012–2015	Heart of Midlothian	45	(8)
2015	→ Raith Rovers (loan)	1	(0)
2015–2016	Kilmarnock	11	(0)
2016–2018	Livingston	23	(4)
2017	→ Cowdenbeath (loan)	16	(6)
2018–2021	Airdrieonians	87	(28)
2021–2025	Stirling Albion	131	(44)
2025-	Stenhousemuir	24	(7)

International career^{‡}
2009	Scotland U16	4	(0)
2012	Scotland U21	1	(0)
- * Club domestic league appearances and goals as of 4 May 2026 ‡ National team caps and goals as of 07:24, 13 January 2019 (UTC)

Dale Carrick (born 7 January 1994) is a Scottish professional footballer who plays as a striker for Stenhousemuir. Carrick started his career with Heart of Midlothian and has also played for Raith Rovers, Kilmarnock, Livingston, Cowdenbeath, Airdrieonians and Stirling Albion. Carrick has represented Scotland at both under-16 and under-21 levels.

== Career ==
Born in Edinburgh, Carrick grew up supporting Hearts. A member of Hearts Under-20 team Carrick made his Scottish Premier League debut on 4 August 2012 in a 2–0 win versus St Johnstone. On 23 August 2012 in only his second appearance, Carrick made his European debut as a substitute in a 1–0 defeat versus Liverpool at Tynecastle. Carrick's first goal for the Jambos arrived on 18 January 2014 in a thrilling 3–3 draw versus the Perth club at McDiarmid Park.

Carrick had joined Raith Rovers on 30 January 2015 on a one-month loan deal. The loan deal was then cut-short on 11 February 2015 as a result of Carrick suffering an injury.

On 8 July 2015, Carrick departed the Tynecastle club to pursue regular first-team football elsewhere with his contract terminated by mutual consent. Carrick then signed a three-year contract with Kilmarnock.

After one season with Killie Carrick then signed for the West Lothian club Livingston in July 2016. On 26 January 2017 Carrick moved on loan to Scottish League Two club Cowdenbeath for the remainder of the 2016-17 season. Carrick departed the Lions in January 2018 and signed for Airdrieonians in an attempt to get more first-team football. He remained at Airdrie until May 2021.

On 28 May 2021, Carrick signed for Scottish League Two side Stirling Albion.

On 2 August 2025, Carrick signed for Stenhousemuir on a one-year contract.

=== Scotland ===
Carrick has represented Scotland at under-16 level. Carrick made his debut in an International Challenge match versus Jersey on 18 August 2009 and made four appearances in total.

== Career statistics ==
Stirling Albion Stats To Be Updated Soon: 2 August 2025

Appearances and goals by club, season and competition
Club	Season	League			Scottish Cup		League Cup		Challenge Cup		Total	
Club	Season	Division	Apps	Goals	Apps	Goals	Apps	Goals	Apps	Goals	Apps	Goals
Heart of Midlothian	2012–13	Scottish Premier League	16	0	0	0	2	0	2 (Note: Appearances in the Europa League)	0	20	0
Heart of Midlothian	2013–14	Scottish Premiership	25	6	1	0	2	0	—		28	6
Heart of Midlothian	2014–15	Scottish Championship	4	2	0	0	1	0	1 (Note: Appearances in the Scottish Challenge Cup)	0	6	2
Heart of Midlothian	Total		45	8	1	0	5	0	3	0	54	8
Raith Rovers (loan)	2014–15	Scottish Championship	1	0	1	0	0	0	0	0	2	0
Kilmarnock	2015–16	Scottish Premiership	11	0	0	0	0	0	0	0	11	0
Livingston	2016–17	Scottish League One	14	3	1	0	3	1	2	0	20	4
Livingston	2017–18	Scottish Championship	9	1	1	0	5	2	0	0	15	2
Livingston	Total		23	4	2	0	8	3	2	0	35	6
Cowdenbeath (loan)	2016–17	Scottish League Two	16	6	0	0	0	0	2 (Note: Appearances in the League Two play-offs)	0	18	6
Airdrieonians	2017–18	Scottish League One	16	5	0	0	0	0	0	0	16	5
Airdrieonians	2018–19	Scottish League One	25	2	2	0	4	1	2	1	33	4
Airdrieonians	2019–20	Scottish League One	24	12	2	0	4	0	3	1	33	13
Airdrieonians	2020–21	Scottish League One	22	9	1	0	4	0	3 (Note: Appearances in the Championship play-offs)	0	30	9
Airdrieonians	Total		87	28	5	0	12	1	8	2	112	31
Stirling Albion	2021–22	Scottish League Two	11	3	0	0	3	0	0	0	14	3
Career total			194	49	9	1	28	4	15	2	246	55

== Honours ==
Heart of Midlothian

- Scottish League Cup: runner–up: 2012–13
- Scottish Championship: 2014–15

Stirling Albion

- Scottish League Two: 2022-23
