= Declan Gallagher =

Scottish footballer (born 1991)

Personal information
- Full name: Declan Patrick Gallagher
- Date of birth: 13 February 1991 (age 35)
- Place of birth: Rutherglen, Scotland
- Position: Centre-back

Team information
- Current team: Airdrieonians
- Number: 31

Youth career
- Hamilton Academical
- Celtic

Senior career*
| Years | Team | Apps | (Gls) |
| 2010–2011 | Celtic | 0 | (0) |
| 2010–2011 | → Stranraer (loan) | 26 | (3) |
| 2011–2012 | Clyde | 25 | (2) |
| 2012–2014 | Dundee | 60 | (4) |
| 2014–2016 | Livingston | 51 | (2) |
| 2017–2019 | Livingston | 84 | (3) |
| 2019–2021 | Motherwell | 59 | (3) |
| 2021–2022 | Aberdeen | 23 | (0) |
| 2022–2023 | St Mirren | 27 | (2) |
| 2023–2025 | Dundee United | 60 | (1) |
| 2025–2026 | Ross County | 30 | (0) |
| 2026– | Airdrieonians | 1 | (0) |

International career^{‡}
| 2019–2021 | Scotland | 9 | (0) |
- * Club domestic league appearances and goals as of 4 May 2026 ‡ National team caps and goals as of 01:41, 27 August 2026 (UTC)

Declan Patrick Gallagher (born 13 February 1991) is a Scottish professional footballer who plays as a centre-back for Scottish League One club Airdrieonians.

Gallagher started his career at Celtic but never made a first team appearance, however he was involved in their Scottish Youth Cup win in 2010. He was then sent out on loan to Stranraer to gain some first team experience. Despite impressing while on loan, he was released and was signed by Clyde before moving on to join Dundee. After experiencing a relegation followed by a promotion in two seasons at Dens Park, he joined Livingston in 2014.

In 2016, Gallagher was imprisoned for more than a year for assault which took place three years earlier. Gallagher returned to Livingston after his release from jail, and he played regularly during their consecutive promotions to the top division between 2017 and 2018. After moving to Motherwell in summer of 2019, he made his Scotland debut in November of that year. Gallagher helped Scotland qualify for UEFA Euro 2020 and was selected for their tournament squad. After spells with Aberdeen and St Mirren, Gallagher joined Dundee United in July 2023.

== Club career ==
=== Celtic, Stranraer loan ===
Born in Rutherglen and raised in Blantyre, Gallagher (who also spent time in the setup at Hamilton Academical) signed for Celtic at a young age and played for the under-19s. He became a regular in the team and played the full 90 minutes in a 2–0 victory over Rangers in the 2010 Scottish Youth Cup final. While at Celtic, Gallagher says he trained with the first team, which "helps [my] match sharpness".

He went out on loan to Stranraer in 2010–11. Gallagher made his senior debut in a 9–0 win over St Cuthbert in the Scottish Cup and scored his first senior goal two weeks later as Stranraer beat Queen's Park 3–1. On 20 November 2010, he scored his second goal in five matches to help Stranraer beat Girvan 4–2 in the Scottish Cup. Gallagher scored his final goal for Stranraer in a 3–2 loss to Montrose on 16 April 2011 and played his final game for the club as they defeated Clyde 3–0. Stranraer finished fifth, just missing out on a play-off place.

Despite impressing while on loan, Gallagher was told he was not needed by Celtic, putting a number of clubs on alert. According to his teammate Nicky Riley, Gallagher left the Glasgow club "for the sake of his career". After being released, he went on trial with Partick Thistle.

=== Clyde ===
On 9 August 2011, Gallagher signed for Clyde. He made his debut for the Bully Wee against Annan Athletic in a 2–2 draw and thereafter became a key player for the club. He scored his first goal for Clyde as they hammered East Stirlingshire 7–1 at Broadwood. On 21 April 2012, he scored a last minute equaliser against Peterhead. During the 2011–12 season, Gallagher missed ten games due to injury. At the end of the season, he had made 26 appearances and scored twice for Clyde.

=== Dundee ===
On 1 June 2012, Gallagher signed for an undisclosed fee for newly promoted Scottish Premier League (SPL) club Dundee, along with Carl Finnigan, after Rangers were removed from the league's membership, creating a space in the SPL. One of his new teammates was former Celtic youth colleague Nicky Riley. When joining Dundee, Gallagher stated that he never thought he was going to play in the top flight and the experience of playing in the SPL was "brilliant".

He made his debut in a League Cup 0–0 draw against Peterhead (Dundee won on penalties); he also played in the next round of the tournament, a defeat to Queens Park at Hampden. Gallagher became a regular in the first team and was paired in the centre of defence with Kyle Benedictus by manager Barry Smith. In a match against Hearts on 2 November 2012, Gallagher made an impressive display during the match and was praised by the manager and teammate Riley. Gallagher played against his former club Celtic on 26 December 2012 as Dundee lost 2–0. In the last 16 of the Scottish Cup, Gallagher scored his first goal for the club in a 5–1 win over Greenock Morton. However, he was unable to prevent the club's relegation to the Scottish Championship.

In his second campaign at Dundee, Gallagher scored his first league goal in a 4–3 loss against Queen of the South in the opening matchday. Two weeks later, on 30 August 2013, he scored again, in a 3–0 win over Livingston. He scored two goals in two matches as Dundee beat Hamilton Academical 3–0 in late November and Morton 2–1 in early December.

Like his first season, Gallagher continuously remained as a first pick in defence. However, in January 2014, contract talks broke down between the club and the player's agent. As a result, Gallagher was linked a move away from Dundee, "as Scottish Premiership and English League One clubs have been monitoring his situation". He rejected offers of a new contract from Dundee, and despite achieving the feat of playing every minute for the club during the league season as Dundee won promotion back to the Scottish Premiership, he was among four players to leave the club at the end of the 2013–14 season.

=== Livingston ===
Gallagher signed for Livingston in July 2014. He scored on his league debut for the Lions in a 2–1 away defeat to Hibernian, and was in the side which won the 2015 Scottish Challenge Cup Final, beating Alloa Athletic.

=== Imprisonment and return to Livingston ===
Gallagher and a co-accused were convicted in June 2015 of an assault at a hotel in Blantyre, South Lanarkshire on the evening of a wedding anniversary party in April 2013. In an attack described by the Sheriff as "brutal", Gallagher struck his victim to the head with a baseball bat or similar implement causing a fractured skull, and was sentenced to three years in prison. Gallagher and his co-accused appealed their sentences and were released on bail the following month, and he was re-signed by Livingston pending its outcome. He went on to make 30 appearances in all competitions during the 2015–16 season up to February 2016, when the appeal was dismissed and he was ordered back to prison.

After training with Raith Rovers during day release from HMP Castle Huntly, in January 2017 Gallagher was released from prison, initially with an electronic monitoring tag. He was immediately signed once again by Livingston and went on to make 15 league appearances, scoring twice including in his return game, as Livi were promoted back as winners of 2016–17 Scottish League One.

Gallagher was a regular for Livingston as they finished runners-up in the 2017–18 Scottish Championship, and played in all four matches as the club subsequently defeated Dundee United and Partick Thistle in the play-offs to achieve a second consecutive promotion.

On 4 August 2018, in his first Premiership match for five years, Gallagher conceded a penalty against his old employers Celtic, who beat Livingston 3–1. The Lions had better fortunes against the other half of the Old Firm two months later, defeating Rangers 1–0.

=== Motherwell ===
On 11 April 2019, Motherwell announced that Gallagher had signed a pre-contract agreement to join the club in the summer. On 26 December 2019, Gallagher scored a winning goal in the last minute of a league fixture away to Ross County.

Ahead of the 2020–21 season, Gallagher was named as Motherwell's new club captain following the departure of Peter Hartley.

=== Aberdeen ===
In May 2021, Aberdeen signed Gallagher on a two-year contract, taking effect when his contract with Motherwell expired.

=== St Mirren ===
In June 2022, St Mirren signed Gallagher on a two-year contract, after his contract at Aberdeen was terminated.

=== Dundee United ===
Gallagher moved to Dundee United in July 2023 for an undisclosed transfer fee.

== International career ==
On 6 October 2019, Gallagher was called into the Scotland squad for the first time, ahead of the Euro 2020 qualifiers against Russia and San Marino. He did not play in those matches, but made his international debut the following month in a 2–1 win in Cyprus. Gallagher played in the play-off win against Serbia that secured qualification for UEFA Euro 2020, the first time Scotland had qualified for a major tournament since the 1998 World Cup. He was selected in the squad for the finals, but did not make an appearance.

== Career statistics ==
=== Club ===
As of 30 June 2022

Appearances and goals by club, season and competition
| Club | Season | League | | | Scottish Cup | | League Cup | | Other | | Total | |
| Club | Season | Division | Apps | Goals | Apps | Goals | Apps | Goals | Apps | Goals | Apps | Goals |
|---|---|---|---|---|---|---|---|---|---|---|---|---|
| Celtic | 2010–11 | Scottish Premier League | 0 | 0 | 0 | 0 | 0 | 0 | 0 | 0 | 0 | 0 |
| Stranraer (loan) | 2010–11 | Scottish Third Division | 26 | 3 | 4 | 1 | 0 | 0 | 0 | 0 | 30 | 4 |
| Clyde | 2011–12 | Scottish Third Division | 25 | 2 | 1 | 0 | 1 | 0 | 0 | 0 | 27 | 2 |
| Dundee | 2012–13 | Scottish Premier League | 24 | 0 | 2 | 1 | 1 | 0 | 0 | 0 | 27 | 1 |
| Dundee | 2013–14 | Scottish Championship | 36 | 4 | 1 | 0 | 2 | 0 | 3 (Note: Appearances in the Scottish Challenge Cup) | 0 | 42 | 4 |
| Dundee | Total | | 60 | 4 | 3 | 1 | 3 | 0 | 3 | 0 | 69 | 5 |
| Livingston | 2014–15 | Scottish Championship | 28 | 1 | 0 | 0 | 2 | 0 | 3 | 0 | 33 | 1 |
| Livingston | 2015–16 | Scottish Championship | 23 | 1 | 2 | 0 | 3 | 1 | 2 | 0 | 30 | 2 |
| Livingston | 2016–17 | Scottish League One | 15 | 2 | 1 | 0 | 0 | 0 | 0 | 0 | 16 | 2 |
| Livingston | 2017–18 | Scottish Championship | 31 | 0 | 2 | 0 | 5 | 0 | 5 (Note: 4 appearances in the Premiership play-offs) | 0 | 43 | 0 |
| Livingston | 2018–19 | Scottish Premiership | 38 | 1 | 1 | 0 | 5 | 0 | 0 | 0 | 27 | 1 |
| Livingston | Total | | 135 | 5 | 6 | 0 | 15 | 1 | 10 | 0 | 166 | 6 |
| Motherwell | 2019–20 | Scottish Premiership | 30 | 2 | 2 | 0 | 4 | 0 | 0 | 0 | 36 | 2 |
| Motherwell | 2020–21 | Scottish Premiership | 29 | 1 | 3 | 0 | 1 | 0 | 3 (Note: Appearances in the UEFA Europa League) | 0 | 36 | 1 |
| Motherwell | Total | | 59 | 3 | 5 | 0 | 5 | 0 | 3 | 0 | 72 | 3 |
| Aberdeen | 2021–22 | Scottish Premiership | 23 | 0 | 2 | 0 | 1 | 0 | 5 (Note: Appearances in the UEFA Europa Conference League) | 0 | 31 | 0 |
| Career total | | | 328 | 17 | 21 | 2 | 25 | 1 | 21 | 0 | 395 | 20 |

=== International ===
As of 26 June 2022

Appearances and goals by national team and year
| National team | Year | Apps | Goals |
|---|---|---|---|
| Scotland | 2019 | 2 | 0 |
| Scotland | 2020 | 5 | 0 |
| Scotland | 2021 | 2 | 0 |
| Total | | 9 | 0 |

== Honours ==
Celtic U19

- SPL under-19 League: 2009–10
- Scottish Youth Cup: 2009–10

Dundee

- Scottish Championship: 2013–14

Livingston

- Scottish Premiership play-offs: 2017–18
- Scottish Challenge Cup: 2014–15
- Scottish League One: 2016–17

Dundee United

- Scottish Championship: 2023–24

Scotland

- UEFA Nations League – League C: 2018–19
