= Nicky Cadden =

Scottish footballer (born 1996)

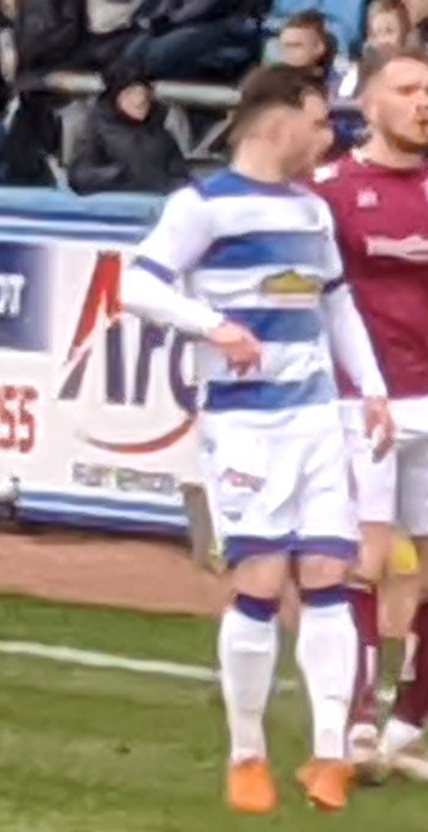

Personal information
- Full name: Nicholas Cadden
- Date of birth: 19 September 1996 (age 30)
- Place of birth: Bellshill, Scotland
- Height: 1.78 m (5 ft 10 in)
- Position: Winger

Team information
- Current team: Hibernian
- Number: 19

Youth career
- –2012: Motherwell
- 2012–2013: Airdrieonians

Senior career*
Years	Team	Apps	(Gls)
2013–2016	Airdrieonians	40	(3)
2016–2019	Livingston	72	(7)
2019	→ Ayr United (loan)	10	(0)
2019–2020	Greenock Morton	22	(5)
2020–2022	Forest Green Rovers	77	(9)
2022–2024	Barnsley	80	(7)
2024–	Hibernian	54	(5)
- * Club domestic league appearances and goals as of 20 May 2026

Nicholas Cadden (born 19 September 1996) is a Scottish professional footballer who plays as a winger for Hibernian. Cadden has previously played for Airdrieonians, Livingston, Ayr United, Greenock Morton, Forest Green Rovers, and Barnsley. He is the twin brother of Chris Cadden.

== Career ==
Both of the Cadden twins played for Motherwell youth teams, where their father was the under-14s coach. Chris Cadden was offered professional terms by Motherwell, but Nicky was released by the club at that stage.

=== Airdrieonians ===
Following his release from Motherwell, Nicky Cadden joined Airdrieonians. He made his first team debut on 16 November 2013 against Dunfermline and scored his first competitive goal over two years later on 26 December 2015 against Peterhead. He left at the end of the 2015–16 season.

=== Livingston ===
Cadden signed for West Lothian side Livingston in summer 2016 ahead of the club's first and only year in Scottish League One. He scored on his first competitive match for the Lions, in a 3–2 loss to St Mirren. He made his league debut in August against former side Airdrieonians and went on to play 33 more games in his first season, scoring 6 goals; Livingston were promoted as champions.

In the 2017–18 Scottish Championship, Cadden appeared 26 times (around half from the bench) as the club finished runners-up, and was then selected for all four playoff matches, Livi defeating Dundee United and Partick Thistle to progress to the Premiership.

==== Loan to Ayr United ====
On 31 January 2019, Cadden moved to Scottish Championship club Ayr United until the end of the 2018–19 season.

=== Greenock Morton ===
In June 2019, Cadden signed for Greenock Morton on a one-year contract.

=== Forest Green Rovers ===
Cadden joined League Two club Forest Green Rovers on 3 July 2020. After not conceding a goal all month and contributing to four out of his side's five goals, the attacking wing-back was awarded the league's Player of the Month award for September 2021. Following Forest Green Rovers' title winning campaign, Cadden was named in both the EFL League Two Team of the Season at the EFL Awards and the PFA League Two Team of the Year. Cadden was offered a new contract at the end of the 2021–22 season.

=== Barnsley ===
On 11 July 2022, Cadden joined newly relegated League One club Barnsley on a two-year deal. On 17 May 2024, the club announced he would be released in the summer when his contract expired.

=== Hibernian ===
On 6 August 2024, Cadden joined Scottish Premiership side Hibernian on a three-year deal. He links up with his twin brother, Chris, who has been at the club since 2021.

== Personal life ==
Nicky's twin brother Chris Cadden formerly played alongside him at Hibernian from 2024 to 2026. Their father Steve won a lower division title with Albion Rovers. The brothers attended Our Lady's High School, Motherwell, one year group ahead of fellow footballer Kieran Tierney.

== Career statistics ==
As of match played 28 February 2026

Appearances and goals by club, season and competition
Club	Season	League			National cup		League cup		Other		Total	
Club	Season	Division	Apps	Goals	Apps	Goals	Apps	Goals	Apps	Goals	Apps	Goals
Airdrieonians	2013–14	Scottish League One	12	0	0	0	0	0	0	0	12	0
Airdrieonians	2014–15	Scottish League One	4	0	1	0	0	0	0	0	5	0
Airdrieonians	2015–16	Scottish League One	24	3	2	0	0	0	0	0	26	3
Airdrieonians	Total		40	3	3	0	0	0	0	0	43	3
Livingston	2016–17	Scottish League One	34	6	2	1	4	1	3 (Note: Appearances in Scottish Challenge Cup)	1	43	9
Livingston	2017–18	Scottish Championship	26	1	1	0	2	0	6 (Note: Two appearances in the 2017–18 Scottish Challenge Cup, four appearances in the Scottish Premiership play-offs)	0	35	1
Livingston	2018–19	Scottish Premiership	12	0	0	0	4	0	0	0	16	0
Livingston	Total		72	7	3	1	10	1	9	1	94	10
Ayr United (loan)	2018–19	Scottish Championship	10	0	0	0	0	0	1 (Note: Appearance in the Scottish Premiership play-offs)	0	11	0
Greenock Morton	2019–20	Scottish Championship	22	5	3	2	5	3	0	0	30	10
Forest Green Rovers	2020–21	League Two	33	3	1	0	1	0	4 (Note: Appearances in EFL Trophy & League Two play-offs)	1	39	4
Forest Green Rovers	2021–22	League Two	44	6	1	0	2	0	1 (Note: Appearances in EFL Trophy)	0	48	6
Forest Green Rovers	Total		77	9	2	0	3	0	5	1	87	10
Barnsley	2022–23	League One	36	5	3	0	0	0	4 (Note: Appearances in EFL Trophy & League One play-offs)	1	43	6
Barnsley	2023–24	League One	44	2	2	1	0	0	3 (Note: Appearances in EFL Trophy & League One play-offs)	0	49	3
Barnsley	Total		80	7	5	1	0	0	7	1	92	9
Hibernian	2024–25	Scottish Premiership	29	5	2	0	1	0	0	0	32	5
Hibernian	2025–26	Scottish Premiership	19	0	1	0	2	0	4	0	26	0
Hibernian	Total		48	5	3	0	3	0	4	0	58	5
Career total			349	36	19	4	21	4	26	3	415	47

== Honours ==
Livingston

- Scottish League One : 2016–17

Forest Green Rovers

- EFL League Two: 2021–22

Individual

- PFA Team of the Year: League Two 2021–22
- EFL League Two Team of the Season: 2021–22
- EFL League Two Player of the Month: September 2021
