= Danny Mullen =

Scottish footballer (born 1995)

Personal information
- Full name: Daniel Mullen
- Date of birth: 1 March 1995 (age 31)
- Height: 1.76 m (5 ft 9 in)
- Position: Striker

Team information
- Current team: Dundalk
- Number: 21

Youth career
- Aberdeen
- 2012: Livingston

Senior career*
Years	Team	Apps	(Gls)
2012–2018	Livingston	141	(33)
2017–2018	→ St Mirren (loan)	5	(0)
2018–2020	St Mirren	54	(10)
2020–2022	Dundee	50	(12)
2022–2023	Partick Thistle	26	(4)
2023–2025	Derry City	71	(17)
2026–	Dundalk	12	(3)
- * Club domestic league appearances and goals as of 17:10, 10 November 2026 (UTC)

Daniel Mullen (born 1 March 1995) is a Scottish professional footballer who plays as a striker for League of Ireland Premier Division club Dundalk. He has previously played for Livingston, St Mirren, Dundee, Partick Thistle and Derry City.

== Career ==
=== Livingston ===
Mullen signed for Livingston at youth level in 2012 after being released by Aberdeen. After progressing through the youth ranks at Livingston, Mullen made his debut for the first-team on 18 August 2012 against Airdrie United as a second-half substitute at the age of 17. He scored his first goal for the club on 8 December 2012 in a 2–1 win over Dunfermline Athletic. In total, he made 24 appearances in all competitions in his first season at the club, with most coming as a substitute.

=== St Mirren ===
With Mullen's contract at Livingston due to expire in 2018, Mullen moved to St Mirren in December 2017. He initially moved on an "emergency loan" basis, with a five-figure transfer fee due to be paid for the permanent transfer in January. On 11 January 2018 it was confirmed that Mullen had signed a 2 1/2-year permanent deal with Saints, tying him to the club until the summer of 2020. In June 2020, Mullen left Saints when his contract expired.

=== Dundee ===
On 4 August 2020, Mullen signed for Dundee, on a two-year deal. Mullen scored his first goal for the club in his debut in a 0–2 win over Brora Rangers in the League Cup.

Mullen would play a major role for Dundee in the Premiersip play-offs final, including scoring a key goal against Kilmarnock to help bring Dundee back to the Premiership.

In the opening game of the season, Mullen suffered a serious ankle injury which required surgery and was expected to keep him out for around 3 months. He recovered earlier than expected and made his return in a home win against Aberdeen. Mullen found his shooting boots after returning, scoring in three consecutive games to help turn the club's form. Mullen left Dundee following the end of his contract in May 2022.

=== Partick Thistle ===
On 21 July 2022, Mullen signed a one-year deal with Scottish Championship side Partick Thistle. He scored on his debut for the Jags in a Scottish League Cup group stage win over Montrose. Mullen would leave Thistle at the end of season following the expiration of his contract.

=== Derry City ===
On 6 July 2023, Mullen signed for League of Ireland Premier Division side Derry City. He made his debut the following day as a substitute in a home win over Sligo Rovers. On 25 August, Mullen scored his first goal for the Candystripes in a league game away to Bohemians. On 9 October 2024, Mullen signed a one-year extension with Derry, keeping him at Brandywell until the end of 2025. On 12 November 2025, it was announced that Mullen would be leaving the club at the end of his contract, after scoring 21 goals in 85 appearances in all competitions during his 2 and a half years with Derry.

=== Dundalk ===
On 2 January 2026, Mullen signed for newly promoted League of Ireland Premier Division club Dundalk.

== Career statistics ==
As of match played 15 August 2026

Appearances and goals by club, season and competition
Club	Season	League			National Cup		League Cup		Other		Total	
Club	Season	Division	Apps	Goals	Apps	Goals	Apps	Goals	Apps	Goals	Apps	Goals
Livingston	2012–13	Scottish First Division	23	2	1	0	0	0	0	0	24	2
Livingston	2013–14	Scottish Championship	23	2	0	0	2	0	1 (Note: Appearances in the Scottish Challenge Cup)	0	26	2
Livingston	2014–15	Scottish Championship	33	10	1	1	3	0	4	1	41	12
Livingston	2015–16	Scottish Championship	19	1	1	0	2	1	4 (Note: Two appearances and a goal in the Scottish Challenge Cup; two appearances and a goal in the Championship play-offs)	2	26	4
Livingston	2016–17	Scottish League One	32	14	2	1	4	1	4	1	42	17
Livingston	2017–18	Scottish Championship	11	4	0	0	4	0	2	1	17	5
Livingston	Total		141	33	5	2	15	2	15	5	176	42
St Mirren (loan)	2017–18	Scottish Championship	5	0	0	0	0	0	0	0	5	0
St Mirren	2017–18	Scottish Championship	14	3	1	0	0	0	0	0	15	3
St Mirren	2018–19	Scottish Premiership	23	5	0	0	5	1	2 (Note: Two appearances in the Scottish Premiership play-offs)	1	30	7
St Mirren	2019–20	Scottish Premiership	17	2	1	1	4	1	0	0	22	4
St Mirren	Total		59	10	2	1	9	2	2	1	72	14
Dundee	2020–21	Scottish Championship	25	5	2	0	3	2	4 (Note: Appearances in the Premiership play-offs)	1	34	8
Dundee	2021–22	Scottish Premiership	25	7	3	0	1	0	0	0	29	7
Dundee	Total		50	12	5	0	4	2	4	1	63	15
Partick Thistle	2022–23	Scottish Championship	26	4	1	0	2	1	6 (Note: One appearance in the Scottish Challenge Cup; five appearances and one goal in the Scottish Premiership play-offs)	1	35	6
Derry City	2023	League of Ireland Premier Division	12	3	2	0	–		4 (Note: Appearance(s) in the UEFA Europa Conference League)	0	18	3
Derry City	2024	League of Ireland Premier Division	32	7	4	3	–		2 (Note: Appearances in the UEFA Conference League)	0	38	10
Derry City	2025	League of Ireland Premier Division	27	7	2	1	–		–		29	8
Derry City	Total		71	17	8	4	–		6	0	85	21
Dundalk	2026	League of Ireland Premier Division	12	3	1	1	–		3 (Note: Appearance(s) in the Leinster Senior Cup)	1	16	5
Career total			361	79	22	8	30	7	36	9	447	103

== Honours ==
Livingston

- Scottish Challenge Cup: 2014–15

St Mirren

- Scottish Championship: 2017–18
