= Josh Mullin =

Scottish footballer

Personal information
- Full name: Joshua Kearney Mullin
- Date of birth: 23 September 1992 (age 34)
- Place of birth: Glasgow, Scotland
- Position: Midfielder

Team information
- Current team: Stirling Albion (Player/Coach)

Youth career
- Rangers
- Celtic
- Falkirk
- Airdrieonians
- –2010: Kilbirnie Ladeside

Senior career*
Years	Team	Apps	(Gls)
2010–2011	East Stirlingshire	0	(0)
2011–2012	Pollok		
2012–2014	Kilbirnie Ladeside		
2014–2016	Albion Rovers	50	(3)
2016–2018	Livingston	64	(7)
2018–2020	Ross County	64	(10)
2020–2023	Livingston	23	(2)
2021–2022	→ Hamilton Academical (loan)	32	(3)
2022–2023	→ Ayr United (loan)	16	(7)
2023	Ayr United	6	(1)
2023–	Raith Rovers	80	(6)
- * Club domestic league appearances and goals as of 23 February 2026

Joshua Kearney Mullin (born 23 September 1992) is a Scottish professional footballer who plays as a midfielder for Scottish Championship club Raith Rovers.

He has previously played for East Stirlingshire, Albion Rovers, Ross County, Hamilton Academical, Livingston and Ayr United, as well as junior clubs Pollok and Kilbirnie Ladeside.

== Career ==
=== Juniors ===
Having been signed as a youth player with a number of clubs, Mullin dropped down to the Scottish Juniors with Pollok and Kilbirnie Ladeside.

=== Albion Rovers ===
Mullin's first appearance in senior football arrived when he signed for Scottish League Two club Albion Rovers in August 2014, having signed a pre-contract agreement with the club in March 2014. His debut came as a second-half substitute for Gary Fisher, in a 2–2 draw with Airdrieonians in the Scottish Challenge Cup in July 2014, whilst his first goal for the side was a 91st-minute strike in a 2–0 victory over Annan Athletic. Mullin helped Rovers win the League Two title.

=== Livingston ===
Mullin signed a two-year deal for Scottish Championship club Livingston on 1 February 2016, for an undisclosed fee. Following the club's relegation to Scottish League One in May 2016, Mullin helped Livingston return to the Scottish Championship at the first attempt, with four goals and five assists in 27 appearances.

=== Ross County ===
Ross County announced the signing of Mullin on 28 May 2018 after he left Livingston under freedom of contract. In his first season with the club Mullin helped County gain promotion back to the Scottish Premiership by winning the Scottish Championship and the Scottish Challenge Cup, coming off of the bench in the final of the latter to score twice. On 2 October 2020, Mullin departed Ross County, after his request to leave was accepted.

=== Livingston (second spell) ===
On 5 October 2020, Mullin returned to Livingston for a second spell, signing until the end of the 2020–21 season, with the option of a further two years. He made his debut the following day, scoring twice in a 5–1 win away to Edinburgh City in the Scottish League Cup.

In August 2021 he moved on loan to Hamilton Academical. Mullin scored his first goal for Hamilton Academical on 26 December 2021 versus Kilmarnock

=== Ayr United ===
Mullin joined Ayr United on a season long loan in August 2022. On 31 January 2023, Mullin would depart his parent club Livingston by mutual consent, and would join Ayr United on a permanent deal the same day.

=== Raith Rovers ===
On 30 May 2023, Mullin joined Scottish Championship club Raith Rovers on a three-year deal.

== Career statistics ==
As of match played 20 August 2022

Appearances and goals by club, season and competition
Club	Season	League			Scottish Cup		League Cup		Other		Total	
Club	Season	Division	Apps	Goals	Apps	Goals	Apps	Goals	Apps	Goals	Apps	Goals
East Stirlingshire	2010–11	Scottish Second Division	0	0	0	0	0	0	0	0	0	0
Albion Rovers	2014–15	Scottish League Two	31	1	3	0	1	0	2 (Note: Appearances in the Scottish Challenge Cup)	0	37	1
Albion Rovers	2015–16	Scottish League One	19	2	0	0	1	0	1	0	21	2
Albion Rovers	Total		50	3	3	0	2	0	3	0	58	3
Livingston	2015–16	Scottish Championship	9	0	0	0	0	0	1 (Note: Appearance in the Championship play-offs)	0	10	0
Livingston	2016–17	Scottish League One	27	4	2	0	4	1	4	0	37	5
Livingston	2017–18	Scottish Championship	28	3	2	0	6	0	5 (Note: Appearance in the Premiership play-offs)	1	41	4
Livingston	Total		64	7	4	0	10	1	10	1	88	9
Ross County	2018–19	Scottish Championship	32	9	2	1	4	2	3	2	41	14
Ross County	2019–20	Scottish Premiership	27	1	1	0	4	1	—		32	2
Ross County	2020–21	Scottish Premiership	5	0	0	0	0	0	—		5	0
Ross County	Total		64	10	3	1	8	3	3	2	78	16
Livingston	2020–21	Scottish Premiership	22	2	1	0	8	3	—		31	5
Livingston	2021–22	Scottish Premiership	0	0	0	0	1	0	—		1	0
Livingston	2022–23	Scottish Premiership	1	0	0	0	2	1	—		3	1
Livingston	Total		23	2	1	0	11	4	0	0	35	6
Career total			201	22	10	1	31	8	16	3	257	34

== Honours ==
Albion Rovers

- Scottish League Two: 2014–15

Livingston

- Scottish League One: 2016–17

Ross County

- Scottish Championship: 2018–19
- Scottish Challenge Cup: 2018–19

Raith Rovers

- Scottish Challenge Cup: 2025–26
