= 1995–96 Livingston F.C. season =

Livingston
1995–96 season
- Manager: Jim Leishman
- Stadium: Meadowbank Stadium; Almondvale Stadium
- Scottish Third Division: Winners
- Scottish Cup: Second round
- League Cup: Third round
- Challenge Cup: Quarter-final
Home colours	Away colours

In their first season in existence as Livingston Football Club, they competed in the Scottish Third Division. They also competed in the Challenge Cup, League Cup and the Scottish Cup.

== Summary ==
At the end of the 1994–95 season, having run into severe financial difficulties, Meadowbank Thistle were facing closure. The club relocated to a new stadium in the new town of Livingston and changed their name for the second time in their history to Livingston FC.

In their first season in the Third Division, having been relegated the previous season, Livingston finished top of the league and were promoted back to the Second Division. They reached the third round of the League cup, the quarter-final of the Challenge Cup and the second round of the Scottish Cup.

== Results & fixtures ==
Win Draw Loss

=== Scottish Third Division ===
12 August 1995 1	Caledonian Thistle	0 – 3	Livingston	Caledonian Stadium

26 August 1995 2	Arbroath	1 – 3	Livingston	Gayfield Park

9 September 1995 3	East Stirlingshire	1 – 2	Livingston	Firs Park

16 September 1995 4	Livingston	2 – 0	Alloa Athletic	Meadowbank Stadium

20 September 1995 5	Livingston	2 – 0	Queen's Park	Meadowbank Stadium

23 September 1995 6	Livingston	2 – 1	Albion Rovers	Meadowbank Stadium

30 September 1995 7	Cowdenbeath	0 – 1	Livingston	Central Park

7 October 1995 8	Ross County	1 – 1	Livingston	Victoria Park

14 October 1995 8	Livingston	0 – 0	Brechin City	Meadowbank Stadium

21 October 1995 9	Queen's Park	0 – 1	Livingston	Hampden Park

28 October 1995 10	Livingston	0 – 1	Arbroath	Meadowbank Stadium

4 November 1995 11	Alloa Athletic	0 – 2	Livingston	Recreation Park

11 November 1995 12	Livingston	1 – 1	East Stirlingshire	Almondvale Stadium

18 November 1995 13	Livingston	0 – 1	Cowdenbeath	Almondvale Stadium

25 November 1995 14	Albion Rovers	0 – 2	Livingston	Cliftonhill

2 December 1995 15	Livingston	0 – 0	Ross County	Almondvale Stadium

16 December 1995 16	Brechin City	0 – 2	Livingston	Glebe Park

10 January 1996 17	Livingston	3 – 1	Queen's Park	Almondvale Stadium

13 January 1996 17	Livingston	0 – 1	Albion Rovers	Almondvale Stadium

17 January 1996 18	Livingston	0 – 2	Caledonian Thistle	Almondvale Stadium

3 February 1996 19	Livingston	0 – 1	Brechin City	Almondvale Stadium

10 February 1996 20	Livingston	1 – 0	Alloa Athletic	Almondvale Stadium

13 February 1996 21	Ross County	2 – 2	Livingston	Victoria Park

17 February 1996 22	East Stirlingshire	0 – 3	Livingston	Firs Park

24 February 1996 23	Arbroath	1 – 2	Livingston	Gayfield Park

28 February 1996 24	Cowdenbeath	0 – 3	Livingston	Central Park

2 March 1996 25	Livingston	2 – 2	Caledonian Thistle	Almondvale Stadium

9 March 1996 26	Albion Rovers	0 – 1	Livingston	Cliftonhill

16 March 1996 27	Livingston	2 – 1	Cowdenbeath	Almondvale Stadium

23 March 1996 28	Alloa Athletic	1 – 1	Livingston	Recreation Park

30 March 1996 29	Livingston	1 – 1	East Stirlingshire	Almondvale Stadium

6 April 1996 30	Livingston	2 – 1	Ross County	Almondvale Stadium

13 April 1996 31	Brechin City	0 – 1	Livingston	Glebe Park

20 April 1996 32	Queen's Park	0 – 0	Livingston	Hampden Park

27 April 1996 33	Livingston	3 – 0	Arbroath	Almondvale Stadium

4 May 1996 34	Caledonian Thistle	1 – 2	Livingston	Caledonian Stadium

=== Scottish League Cup ===
5 August 1995 First round	Montrose	0 – 2	Livingston	Links Park

19 August 1995 Second round	St Johnstone	1 – 1 (a.e.t.) (2 – 4 p)	Livingston	McDiarmid Park

30 August 1995 Third round	Livingston	1 – 2	Partick Thistle	Almondvale Stadium

=== Scottish Challenge Cup ===
23 August 1995 First round	Livingston	1 – 0	Greenock Morton	Meadowbank Stadium

13 September 1995 Second round	Livingston	2 – 0	St Mirren	Meadowbank Stadium

13 September 1995 Quarter-final	Livingston	1 – 1 (a.e.t.)	Stirling Albion	Meadowbank Stadium
Note: Stirling Albion won on penalties.

=== Scottish Cup ===
9 December 1995 First round	Stranraer	0 – 3	Livingston	Stair Park

6 January 1996 Second round	Caledonian Thistle	3 – 2	Livingston	Caledonian Stadium

== Statistics ==
=== League table ===
Pos	Team	Pld	W	D	L	GF	GA	GD	Pts	Promotion
1	Livingston (C, P)	36	21	9	6	51	24	+27	72	Promotion to the Second Division
2	Brechin City (P)	36	18	9	9	41	21	+20	63	Promotion to the Second Division
3	Caledonian Thistle	36	15	12	9	64	38	+26	57	
4	Ross County	36	12	17	7	56	39	+17	53	
5	Arbroath	36	13	13	10	41	41	0	52	

Source: Soccerway
Rules for classification: 1) points; 2) goal difference; 3) number of goals scored.
(C) Champions; (P) Promoted
