= Gary Maley =

Scottish footballer

Personal information
- Date of birth: 3 August 1982 (age 44)
- Place of birth: Scotland
- Position: Goalkeeper

Senior career*
Years	Team	Apps	(Gls)
?–2016	Broxburn Athletic		
2016–2022	Livingston	5	(0)
2018	→ Cowdenbeath (loan)	1	(0)
2021	→ Queen of the South (loan)	0	(0)
2021	→ Queen of the South (loan)	0	(0)
2022	→ Clyde (loan)	2	(0)
- * Club domestic league appearances and goals as of 22:04, 8 December 2021 (UTC)

Gary Maley (born 3 August 1982) is a Scottish professional football coach and former player, who is the goalkeeping coach at Sporting JAX of USL Championship. He played as a goalkeeper for Scottish Premiership side Livingston.

== Club career ==
Maley's early playing career saw him play at Broxburn Athletic alongside David Martindale and Scott Pittman.

An engineer by trade, Maley only signed his first contract in 2016, as backup to Livingston goalkeeper Liam Kelly. He spent a loan spell with Cowdenbeath in 2018, making 1 league appearance for them.

In 2020, Maley went viral after Livingston set up a Twitter poll asking the public whether his contract should be extended. Club manager David Martindale had initially pledged to donate £1 to the John O'Byrne Foundation for every vote cast, with Maley also donating two months' wages, but with the poll eventually reaching 180,000 votes, Martindale instead limited his donation to £1,000.

Maley had two short emergency loan spells at Queen of the South in 2021.

After another loan spell with Clyde in early 2022, Maley made his debut for Livingston in May, six years after signing for the club, as a substitute in a match against Dundee. At the age of 39 years, 285 days old, Maley became the oldest player to make his debut in the Scottish Premiership (or Scottish Premier League) since at least 1998.

== Coaching career ==
=== Livingston ===
Maley retired as a player at the end of the 2021–22 season and was appointed First Team Goalkeeping Coach at Livingston. He left the club in May 2024.

=== Arbroath ===
In June 2024, Maley was appointed as goalkeeping coach at Arbroath.

=== Sporting JAX ===
On 5 February 2026, USL Championship expansion club Sporting Club Jacksonville, better known as Sporting JAX, announced their full inaugural roster and coaching staff through the club's Instagram. The announcement listed Maley as goalkeeper coach.
