= Scott Pittman =

Scottish footballer

Personal information
- Date of birth: 9 July 1992 (age 34)
- Place of birth: Fort Lauderdale, USA
- Position: Attacking midfielder

Team information
- Current team: Livingston
- Number: 8

Youth career
- Hamilton Academical

Senior career*
Years	Team	Apps	(Gls)
2011	Hamilton Academical	0	(0)
2011	→ Alloa Athletic (loan)	1	(0)
2011–2014	Broxburn Athletic		
2014–2015	Bo'ness United		
2015–	Livingston	374	(46)
- * Club domestic league appearances and goals as of 20 May 2026

Scott Pittman (born 9 July 1992) is a Scottish footballer who plays as an attacking midfielder for Scottish Championship club Livingston.

== Background ==
He is a son of Steve Pittman, who played for Dundee, East Fife and Partick Thistle as a full back, and also represented the United States at international level.

== Career ==
Pittman began his career at Hamilton Academical and on 25 March 2011, he signed on loan for Alloa Athletic. He was first called up for a matchday squad on 26 March 2011, remaining an unused substitute for their goalless home draw with Peterhead in the Scottish Second Division. Three days later, he made his only appearance for the club, as a last-minute substitute for Jim Lister in a 3–2 defeat at Brechin City.

On 11 August 2011, having been released by Hamilton, Pittman signed for junior club Broxburn Athletic, managed by his father. He later continued his junior career with Bo'ness United joining the club in June 2014.

On 3 February 2015, after three other Scottish Professional Football League teams had made offers, he joined Scottish Championship club Livingston. Four days after his acquisition, he made his debut in a 3–2 home defeat to Heart of Midlothian, playing the final four minutes in place of Ibra Sekajja. On 5 April, Pittman played the full 90 minutes of the 2015 Scottish Challenge Cup Final at McDiarmid Park in Perth, scoring the first goal of a 4–0 win over his former team Alloa. On 24 October 2015, he scored the first league goal of his career, equalising in a 4–1 win at Queen of the South.

On 7 May 2018, in the first leg of the Scottish Premiership play-off semi-final, Pittman scored the winning goal as Livingston won 3–2 away to Dundee United. He scored again in the first leg of the final, getting Livingston's second goal in a 2–1 win at home against Partick Thistle. He also played in the second leg as Livingston won 1–0 to complete a 3–1 aggregate victory to gain promotion to the Scottish Premiership.

On 22 March 2019, Pittman signed a new contract, keeping him at Livingston until 2021.

During his spell at Livingston, Pittman has broken several records. In April 2022 he became the club's record top-flight appearance holder with 124, surpassing Oscar Rubio's tally. In August the same year he became the record appearance holder in the Livingston era, breaking Keaghan Jacobs' record.

In October 2022 Pittman signed a further contract extension, penning a three-year deal lasting until the end of the 2025/26 season and taking him into a testimonial year.

== Career statistics ==
As of match played 26 June 2025

Appearances and goals by club, season and competition
Club	Season	League			Scottish Cup		League Cup		Other		Total	
Club	Season	Division	Apps	Goals	Apps	Goals	Apps	Goals	Apps	Goals	Apps	Goals
Hamilton Academical	2010–11	Scottish Premier League	0	0	0	0	0	0	0	0	0	0
Alloa Athletic (loan)	2010–11	Scottish Second Division	1	0	0	0	0	0	0	0	1	0
Bo'ness United	2014–15	East Superleague	0	0	4	0	—		0	0	4	0
Livingston	2014–15	Scottish Championship	12	0	0	0	0	0	1 (Note: Appearances in Scottish Challenge Cup)	1	13	1
Livingston	2015–16	Scottish Championship	32	2	2	0	3	0	4 (Note: Two appearances in Scottish Challenge Cup, two appearances in Scottish Championship play-offs)	0	41	2
Livingston	2016–17	Scottish League One	36	9	2	0	2	0	3	1	43	10
Livingston	2017–18	Scottish Championship	35	4	2	0	6	0	6 (Note: Two appearances in Scottish Challenge Cup, four appearances in Scottish Premiership play-offs)	2	49	6
Livingston	2018–19	Scottish Premiership	38	6	1	0	5	1	–		44	7
Livingston	2019–20	Scottish Premiership	23	3	2	0	5	1	–		30	4
Livingston	2020–21	Scottish Premiership	38	6	2	0	7	0	–		47	7
Livingston	2021–22	Scottish Premiership	28	4	2	0	5	0	–		35	4
Livingston	2022–23	Scottish Premiership	33	0	2	1	5	1	–		40	2
Livingston	2023–24	Scottish Premiership	29	2	2	0	6	0	–		37	2
Livingston	2024–25	Scottish Championship	35	5	4	0	4	0	7 (Note: Three appearances in Scottish Challenge Cup, four appearances in Scottish Premiership play-offs)	2	10	3
Livingston	Total		339	41	21	1	48	3	21	6	429	51
Career total			340	41	25	1	48	3	21	6	434	51

== Honours ==
Livingston

- Scottish Challenge Cup: 2014–15
- Scottish League One: 2016–17
- Scottish Premiership play-offs: 2018
- Scottish Challenge Cup: 2024–25
- Scottish Premiership play-offs: 2025
