= Antony Stokes =

British diplomat (born 1965)

Nigel Antony David Stokes LVO OBE (born 21 January 1965) was British Ambassador to Cuba from 2016 to 2022.

Stokes was educated at Queens' College, Cambridge and University College London (PhD, 1990). After working for Schlumberger and Mars, Incorporated he joined Her Majesty's Diplomatic Service in 1994. He served in Bangkok, Seoul and Riga before his appointment as Ambassador to the Socialist Republic of Vietnam in 2010.

Stokes was appointed Officer of the Order of the British Empire (OBE) in the 2022 New Year Honours for services to British foreign policy.
