= Balmoor =

- village
- Interactive map of Balmoor
- Country: India
- State: Telangana
- District: Nagarkurnool

Languages
  - Official: Telugu
- Time zone: UTC+5:30 (IST)
- PIN: 509401
- Vehicle registration: TS-22
- Vidhan Sabha constituency: Achampet
- Climate: hot (Köppen)
- Website: telangana.gov.in

Balmoor is a Mandal in Nagarkurnool district, Telangana, India.

== Institutions ==
- Zilla Parishad High School.
- Upper Primary School.
- KGBV School.
- There is a post office.
- Tahashildar office.
- MPDO office.
- Police station.
- PHC.
- ICDS Office.
- Union Bank of India.
- BC Girls Hostel.
- SC Boys Hostel.
- ST Girls Hostel.
- Pragathi Vidya Niketan.

== Villages ==
The villages in Balmoor mandal include:

- Ananthavaram
- Ambhagiri
- Balmoor
- Banala
- Chennaram
- Ramagiri Chenchugudem
- Gattuthummen
- Godal
- GudiBanda
- Ippakunta
- Jinkunta
- Jillellapally
- Kondanagula
- Kondareddypally
- Kothapally
- Laxmipally
- Mangalkunta pally
- Mahedevpur
- Narsai pally
- Polisettypally
- Polepally
- Ramajipally
- ThodellaGadda
- Thummanpet
- Billakal
- Mylaram
- Seetharamapuram
- Ram Nagar Colony
- VeeramRaju palle
