= Spas Georgiev =

Bulgarian footballer

Personal information
- Full name: Spas Ivanov Georgiev
- Date of birth: 21 June 1992 (age 34)
- Place of birth: Stara Zagora, Bulgaria
- Height: 1.76 m (5 ft 9 in)
- Position: Midfielder

Team information
- Current team: Lokomotiv Gorna Oryahovitsa
- Number: 17

Youth career
- 2000–2008: Beroe
- 2008–2011: Slavia Sofia

Senior career*
Years	Team	Apps	(Gls)
2010–2013	Slavia Sofia	31	(1)
2012	→ Montana (loan)	3	(0)
2013–2015	Dobrudzha Dobrich	38	(2)
2015–2016	Livingston	8	(0)
2016	→ Albion Rovers (loan)	12	(0)
2016	Dunav Ruse	7	(0)
2017–2018	Botev Vratsa	56	(11)
2019	CSKA 1948	12	(0)
2019–2020	Septemvri Sofia	20	(5)
2020–2022	Pirin Blagoevgrad	50	(5)
2022–2023	Beroe Stara Zagora	31	(0)
2023–2025	Botev Vratsa	51	(1)
2025–2026	Sportist Svoge	26	(2)
2026–	Lokomotiv Gorna Oryahovitsa	14	(0)
- * Club domestic league appearances and goals as of 5 November 2026

Spas Ivanov Georgiev (Bulgarian: Спас Иванов Георгиев; born 21 June 1992) is a Bulgarian professional footballer who plays as a midfielder for Lokomotiv Gorna Oryahovitsa.

== Playing career ==
Georgiev signed for Scottish side Livingston in July 2015. The midfielder was recommended to then manager Mark Burchill by his former Portsmouth teammate Svetoslav Todorov.

He spent a short spell on loan with Albion Rovers before leaving Livi by mutual consent in May 2016.
