= Matthew Knox =

Scottish footballer

Personal information
- Date of birth: 22 December 1999 (age 26)
- Place of birth: Edinburgh, Scotland
- Position: Striker

Team information
- Current team: Dunbar United

Youth career
- 2011–2015: Livingston

Senior career*
Years	Team	Apps	(Gls)
2015–2019	Livingston	17	(0)
2018	→ East Fife (loan)	10	(0)
2019	→ Berwick Rangers (loan)	5	(0)
2019–2020	Brechin City	17	(1)
2020–2021	Warrenpoint Town	7	(1)
2021–2022	Tranent Juniors F.C.		
2022–2025	Musselburgh Athletic		
2025–	Dunbar United		

International career
2015	Scotland U17	2	(0)
- * Club domestic league appearances and goals as of 11:34, 2 January 2021 (UTC)

Matthew Knox (born 22 December 1999) is a Scottish footballer who plays as a striker for Dunbar United. He has previously played for Livingston, East Fife, Berwick Rangers, Brechin City, Tranent Juniors and Musselburgh Athletic.

== Career ==
Knox grew up in Prestonpans, East Lothian. He became the youngest player in Livingston's history when he made his first-team debut against St Mirren on Boxing Day, just four days after his 16th birthday. Knox made his first starting appearance for Livingston on 26 April 2016, during which he set up the only goal in a 1–0 win against Rangers.

Knox was loaned to East Fife in January 2018, and Berwick Rangers in January 2019.

During his time at Livingston, Knox went on trial at Rangers in 2016 and also had trials in England with Manchester United, Liverpool and Sunderland.

On 11 July 2019, Knox signed for Scottish League Two club Brechin City.

He played for Tranent Juniors during the 2021–22 season.

Knox signed for Musselburgh Athletic in 2022.

In June 2025, Knox signed for Dunbar United.

== Career statistics ==
As of match played 4 January 2020

Appearances and goals by club, season and competition
Club	Season	League			Scottish Cup		League Cup		Other		Total	
Club	Season	Division	Apps	Goals	Apps	Goals	Apps	Goals	Apps	Goals	Apps	Goals
Livingston	2015–16	Scottish Championship	7	0	1	0	0	0	0	0	8	0
Livingston	2016–17	Scottish League One	8	0	0	0	3	0	1 (Note: Appearances in the Scottish Challenge Cup)	0	12	0
Livingston	2017–18	Scottish Championship	2	0	1	0	2	0	1	0	6	0
Livingston	2018–19	Scottish Premiership	0	0	0	0	1	0	2 (Note: Appearances for Livingston under-21s in the Scottish Challenge Cup in which age-restricted sides from the Scottish Premiership clubs compete against senior clubs)	1	3	1
Livingston	Total		17	0	2	0	6	0	4	1	29	1
East Fife (loan)	2017–18	Scottish League One	10	0	0	0	0	0	0	0	10	0
Berwick Rangers (loan)	2018–19	Scottish League Two	5	0	0	0	0	0	0	0	5	0
Brechin City	2019–20	Scottish League Two	15	1	2	0	4	0	1	0	7	0
Career total			47	1	4	0	10	0	5	1	66	2

== Honours ==
Musselburgh

- East of Scotland League Cup: 2024–25
