= Kieran Gibbons =

Scottish footballer

Personal information
- Date of birth: 6 February 1995 (age 31)
- Place of birth: Scotland
- Position: Central midfielder

Team information
- Current team: Tranent

Youth career
- –2009: Hamilton Academical
- 2011–2014: Aberdeen

Senior career*
Years	Team	Apps	(Gls)
2014–2015	Aberdeen	1	(0)
2015–2016	Livingston	25	(0)
2016	→ Cowdenbeath (loan)	12	(0)
2016–2018	East Kilbride	81	(8)
2018–2019	Stenhousemuir	32	(0)
2019–2020	East Kilbride	20	(2)
2020–2022	East Stirlingshire	54	(1)
2022–2023	Open Goal Broomhill	2	(0)
2023–	Peterhead	0	(0)
2024–	→ Tranent (loan)	10	(0)
- * Club domestic league appearances and goals as of 14 December 2024

Kieran Gibbons (born 6 February 1995) is a Scottish footballer who plays as a midfielder for Lowland League East club Tranent on loan from Peterhead.

Gibbons has also played for Aberdeen, Livingston, Cowdenbeath, Stenhousemuir, East Kilbride, East Stirlingshire and Open Goal Broomhill. Gibbons is the cousin of Aston Villa captain John McGinn.

== Career ==
Gibbons began his career at youth level with Hamilton Academical, leaving the club in 2009; upon his departure he was then unable to sign for another club unless they paid Hamilton £9000 in compensation. In January 2011, Hamilton agreed to release his registration and he signed for Aberdeen. He made his only appearance on 23 November 2014, coming on as an 86th-minute substitute for Cammy Smith in their 1–0 win at Partick Thistle in the Scottish Premiership. He was an unused substitute in five more league matches and one Scottish Cup fixture as Aberdeen finished as Premiership runners-up.

On 30 June 2015, after a trial, Gibbons signed for Scottish Championship club Livingston. He made his debut on 25 July, in the first round of the Scottish Challenge Cup, playing the entirety of a 2–1 home win over Clyde. In February 2016, Gibbons signed on loan with Cowdenbeath for the remainder of the 2015–16 season.

Gibbons joined East Kilbride in the 2016 close season, spending two seasons with the side before joining Stenhousemuir in May 2018.

Gibbons moved to East Stirlingshire on 1 July 2020.

Gibbons started every game for the Lowland League side, partnering ex-Aberdeen FC teammate Nicky Low in central midfield.

The midfielder signed for Open Goal Broomhill in 2022.

== Honours ==
Aberdeen SPFL Reserve League 2014/15

East Kilbride

- Lowland Football League: 2016–17
- SFA South Region Challenge Cup: 2016–17
- East of Scotland Qualifying Cup: 2017–18
