= Jordyn Sheerin =

Scottish footballer

Personal information
- Date of birth: 18 August 1989 (age 37)
- Place of birth: Edinburgh, Scotland
- Position: Forward

Team information
- Current team: Gala Fairydean Rovers (assistant manager)

Youth career
- –2008: Hutchison Vale

Senior career*
Years	Team	Apps	(Gls)
2008–2010	East Fife	6	(0)
2008–2009	→ Arniston Rangers (loan)		
2009–2010	→ Camelon Juniors (loan)		
2010–2011	Arbroath	15	(0)
2011–2012	East Stirlingshire	19	(1)
2012–2013	Camelon Juniors		
2013–2014	Heriot Vale AFC		
2014–2015	Musselburgh		
2015–2016	Livingston	29	(3)
2016–2017	Berwick Rangers	19	(9)
2017–2018	Kelty Hearts		
2018	→ Cowdenbeath (loan)	12	(4)
2018–2019	Cowdenbeath	24	(12)

Managerial career
- 2019–2020: Craigroyston
- * Club domestic league appearances and goals as of 12:15, 28 August 2019 (UTC)

Jordyn Sheerin (born 18 August 1989) is a Scottish professional footballer and current assistant manager of Lowland League team Gala Fairydean Rovers.

== Career ==
=== East Fife and loans ===
Sheerin started his career with East Fife, where he stayed until 2010. Unable to fully break into the first team due to weight issues, he was loaned out to Arniston Rangers and Camelon Juniors where he went on to win the East of Scotland Cup. After leaving East Fife, Sheerin signed for Arbroath on a free transfer.

=== Arbroath, East Stirlingshire and Junior ===
Sheerin moved to Arbroath looking to score his first goal for a Scottish professional team. He stayed at Arbroath for one season and was part of the side which won the Scottish Third Division. He subsequently moved to Third Division club East Stirlingshire, where he scored his first professional goal, which would be his only goal for the Shire. He then signed on a permanent basis for Camelon Juniors, however, after one season he left the club, signing for amateur side Heriot Vale.

After one season with Heriot Vale, Sheerin moved to SJFA East Superleague club Musselburgh in July 2014, where he scored four goals in the sides opening two matches. He continued his impressive form throughout the season, scoring 42 goals in all competitions.

=== Senior football return ===
Sheernin's form with Musselburgh caught the attention of Scottish Championship side Livingston, who signed him on a two-year deal, making him one of the first summer signings. He went on to score three league goals in the 2015–16 season, but often found himself on the right-wing. On 2 June 2016, Sheerin signed for Scottish League Two side Berwick Rangers on a one-year deal, however, he left the club in February 2017, having scored seven goals in 26 appearances.

=== Junior return and Cowdenbeath ===
After leaving Berwick, Sheerin subsequently signed for SJFA East Superleague club Kelty Hearts on 8 February 2017. Sheerin was loaned out to Cowdenbeath the following season and signed on a permanent basis after a successful loan spell.

=== Craigroyston ===
In August 2019, Sheerin and Cowdenbeath agreed to cancel his contract so he could take up the manager reigns at Craigroyston. He left the club on 6 February 2020.

=== Gala Fairydean Rovers ===
On 9 October 2020, Sheerin was appointed as assistant manager by Gala Fairydean Rovers for the 2020-21 Lowland League season.

== Personal life ==
In January 2024, Sheerin, along with Don Webley, was charged over an alleged attack on a taxi driver in West Lothian. Following an appearance at Livingston Sheriff Court on 29 January, both men were released on bail while the case was submitted for further examination by prosecutors.
