= 2015–16 Scottish Championship =

Ladbrokes Championship
- Season: 2015–16
- Champions: Rangers
- Promoted: Rangers
- Relegated: Alloa Athletic; Livingston
- Europa League: Hibernian
- Matches: 180
- Goals: 483 (2.68 per match)
- Top goalscorer: Martyn Waghorn (20 goals)
- Biggest home win: Queen of the South 6–0 Dumbarton (19 March 2016)
- Biggest away win: Dumbarton 0–6 Rangers (2 January 2016)
- Highest scoring: Raith Rovers 4–3 St Mirren (5 March 2016); Rangers 4–3 Queen of the South (26 March 2016)
- Longest winning run: 11 matches: Rangers
- Longest unbeaten run: 14 matches: Hibernian
- Longest winless run: 12 matches: Alloa Athletic
- Longest losing run: 7 matches: Alloa Athletic
- Highest attendance: 50,349; Rangers 1–1 Alloa Athletic (23 April 2016)
- Lowest attendance: 468; Dumbarton 3–1 Alloa Athletic (8 March 2016)
- Total attendance: 1,331,484
- Average attendance: 7,397
- All statistics correct as of 7 May 2016.

The 2015–16 Scottish Championship (referred to as the Ladbrokes Championship for sponsorship reasons) was the 22nd season in the current format of 10 teams in the second tier of Scottish football.

Rangers won the league title and promotion after a 1–0 win against Dumbarton on 5 April 2016, while Alloa Athletic were relegated after a 0–0 draw against Livingston on 2 April 2016.

== Teams ==
The following teams have changed division since the 2014–15 season.

=== To Championship ===
Promoted from Scottish League One

- Greenock Morton

Relegated from Scottish Premiership

- St Mirren

=== From Championship ===
Promoted to Scottish Premiership

- Heart of Midlothian

Relegated to Scottish League One

- Cowdenbeath

=== Stadia and locations ===
Alloa Athletic	Dumbarton	Falkirk	Greenock Morton
Recreation Park	Dumbarton Football Stadium	Falkirk Stadium	Cappielow Park
Capacity: 3,100	Capacity: 2,020	Capacity: 8,750	Capacity: 11,589
Hibernian	2015–16 Scottish Championship is located in Scotland South		Livingston
Easter Road	2015–16 Scottish Championship is located in Scotland South		Almondvale Stadium
Capacity: 20,421	2015–16 Scottish Championship is located in Scotland South		Capacity: 9,865
Queen of the South	Raith Rovers	Rangers	St Mirren
Palmerston Park	Stark's Park	Ibrox Stadium	St Mirren Park
Capacity: 8,690	Capacity: 8,867	Capacity: 50,817	Capacity: 8,023

=== Personnel and kits ===
Team	Manager	Kit manufacturer	Shirt sponsor
Alloa Athletic	(Scotland) Jack Ross	Pendle	Marshall Construction
Dumbarton	(Scotland) Stephen Aitken	Joma	Baxter Ramsay
Falkirk	(Scotland) Peter Houston	Puma	Central Demolition
Greenock Morton	(Scotland) Jim Duffy	Nike	Millions Sweets
Hibernian	(England) Alan Stubbs	Nike	Marathonbet
Livingston	(Scotland) David Hopkin	Joma	Energy Assets
Queen of the South	(England) Gavin Skelton (Caretaker)	Joma	Palmerston Cafe
Raith Rovers	(Scotland) Ray McKinnon	Puma	valmcdermid.com (Home shirt); D&G Autocare (Away shirt)
Rangers	(England) Mark Warburton	Puma	32Red
St Mirren	(Scotland) Alex Rae	Carbrini	JD Sports

=== Managerial changes ===
Team	Outgoing manager	Manner of departure	Date of vacancy	Position in table	Incoming manager	Date of appointment
Dumbarton	(Scotland) Ian Murray	Signed by St Mirren	22 May 2015	Pre-season	(Scotland) Stevie Aitken	27 May 2015
St Mirren	(Scotland) Gary Teale	Sacked	22 May 2015	Pre-season	(Scotland) Ian Murray	22 May 2015
Raith Rovers	(Scotland) Laurie Ellis (interim)	End of interim spell	23 May 2015	Pre-season	(Scotland) Ray McKinnon	23 May 2015
Rangers	(Scotland) Stuart McCall (interim)	End of interim spell	15 June 2015	Pre-season	(England) Mark Warburton	15 June 2015
Alloa Athletic	(Scotland) Danny Lennon	Resigned	7 December 2015	10th	(Scotland) Jack Ross	15 December 2015
St Mirren	(Scotland) Ian Murray	Resigned	12 December 2015	8th	(Scotland) Alex Rae	18 December 2015
Livingston	(Scotland) Mark Burchill	Sacked	21 December 2015	9th	(Scotland) David Hopkin^{a}	23 December 2015
Queen of the South	(Scotland) James Fowler	Sacked	19 April 2016	7th	(England) Gavin Skelton (interim)	19 April 2016

a.Initially interim, made permanent 5 January 2016

== League table ==
Pos	Team	Pld	W	D	L	GF	GA	GD	Pts	Promotion, qualification or relegation
1	Rangers (C, P)	36	25	6	5	88	34	+54	81	Promotion to the Premiership
2	Falkirk	36	19	13	4	61	34	+27	70	Qualification for the Premiership play-off semi-finals
3	Hibernian	36	21	7	8	59	34	+25	70	Qualification for the Europa League second qualifying round and for the Premiership play-off quarter-finals (Note: Hibernian qualified for the Europa League second qualifying round by winning the 2015–16 Scottish Cup.)
4	Raith Rovers	36	18	8	10	52	46	+6	62	Qualification for the Premiership play-off quarter-finals
5	Greenock Morton	36	11	10	15	39	42	−3	43	
6	St Mirren	36	11	9	16	44	53	−9	42	
7	Queen of the South	36	12	6	18	46	56	−10	42	
8	Dumbarton	36	10	7	19	35	66	−31	37	
9	Livingston (R)	36	8	7	21	37	51	−14	31	Qualification for the Championship play-offs
10	Alloa Athletic (R)	36	4	9	23	22	67	−45	21	Relegation to League One

Source: Soccerway
Rules for classification: 1) Points; 2) Goal difference; 3) Number of goals scored
(C) Champions; (P) Promoted; (R) Relegated

== Results ==
Teams play each other four times, twice in the first half of the season (home and away) and twice in the second half of the season (home and away), making a total of 36 games.

=== First half of season ===
Home \ Away	ALO	DUM	FAL	GMO	HIB	LIV	QOS	RAI	RAN	STM
Alloa Athletic		0–2	1–1	0–1	0–1	0–3	1–2	0–1	1–5	0–2
Dumbarton	0–2		0–5	1–2	2–1	2–1	0–2	3–3	1–2	1–0
Falkirk	5–0	2–1		1–0	0–1	2–0	0–0	1–0	2–1	3–0
Greenock Morton	1–0	0–0	1–1		0–1	1–0	2–0	1–2	0–4	0–0
Hibernian	3–0	4–2	1–1	1–0		2–1	1–0	2–0	2–1	1–1
Livingston	0–1	1–1	1–2	2–4	0–1		0–1	3–0	1–1	0–1
Queen of the South	3–1	1–0	2–2	2–2	0–3	1–4		1–1	1–5	0–2
Raith Rovers	3–0	1–0	1–2	2–1	1–2	3–0	1–0		0–1	1–1
Rangers	4–0	4–0	3–1	2–2	1–0	3–0	2–1	5–0		3–1
St Mirren	1–1	1–2	2–3	1–1	1–4	1–1	1–0	1–2	0–1	

Source: Scottish Championship
Legend: Blue = home team win; Yellow = draw; Red = away team win.

=== Second half of season ===
Home \ Away	ALO	DUM	FAL	GMO	HIB	LIV	QOS	RAI	RAN	STM
Alloa Athletic		1–1	0–1	2–2	1–0	1–3	2–2	1–1	1–1	0–1
Dumbarton	3–1		1–1	0–0	3–2	1–0	4–2	2–3	0–6	2–1
Falkirk	2–0	1–0		1–0	1–1	1–2	3–1	2–2	3–2	3–2
Greenock Morton	4–1	2–0	0–1		0–0	2–1	3–2	0–1	0–2	0–1
Hibernian	3–0	4–0	2–2	0–3		2–1	2–0	1–0	3–2	3–1
Livingston	0–0	2–0	1–1	0–0	0–0		0–2	0–1	1–0	2–3
Queen of the South	1–0	6–0	2–2	1–0	1–0	3–1		1–2	0–1	1–0
Raith Rovers	0–1	0–0	2–2	3–2	2–1	2–0	2–0		3–3	4–3
Rangers	1–1	1–0	1–0	3–1	4–2	4–1	4–3	2–0		1–0
St Mirren	3–1	1–0	0–0	3–1	2–2	1–4	2–1	1–2	2–2	

Legend: Blue = home team win; Yellow = draw; Red = away team win.

== Season statistics ==
=== Scoring ===
==== Top scorers ====
As of matches played on 1 May 2016

Rank	Player	Club	Goals
1	(England) Martyn Waghorn	Rangers	20
2	(Australia) Jason Cummings	Hibernian	18
3	(Scotland) John Baird	Falkirk	17
4	(Scotland) Denny Johnstone	Greenock Morton	14
4	(Scotland) Kenny Miller	Rangers	14
6	(Scotland) Derek Lyle	Queen of the South	13
7	(Scotland) Liam Buchanan	Livingston	11
7	(Scotland) Iain Russell	Queen of the South	11
7	(Scotland) Stevie Mallan	St Mirren	11

=== Discipline ===
==== Player ====
===== Yellow cards =====
As of matches played on 1 May 2016

Rank	Player	Club	Cards
1	(Scotland) Darren Barr	Dumbarton	9
1	(South Africa) Kyle Jacobs	Queen of the South	9
3	(England) Jon Routledge	Dumbarton	8
3	(Scotland) Declan McManus	Greenock Morton	8
3	(Scotland) Liam Henderson	Hibernian	8
3	(Scotland) Lewis Stevenson	Hibernian	8
3	(Scotland) Ben Gordon	Livingston	8
3	(Scotland) Chris Higgins	Queen of the South	8
3	(Scotland) Lewis Toshney	Raith Rovers	8
10	9 players		7

===== Red cards =====
As of matches played on 1 May 2016

Rank	Player	Club	Cards
1	(Scotland) Kyle Benedictus	Raith Rovers	2
1	(Scotland) Andy Halliday	Rangers	2
3	22 players		1

==== Club ====
===== Yellow cards =====
As of matches played on 1 May 2016

Rank	Club	Cards
1	Queen of the South	72
2	Raith Rovers	62
3	Greenock Morton	61
3	Livingston	61

===== Red cards =====
As of matches played on 1 May 2016

Rank	Club	Cards
1	Alloa Athletic	4
1	Dumbarton	4
1	St Mirren	4
4	Queen of the South	3
4	Raith Rovers	3

=== Attendances ===
Pos	Team	Total	High	Low	Average	Change
1	Alloa Athletic	20,182	3,100	492	1,121	−21.2%
2	Dumbarton	18,739	1,978	468	1,041	−2.9%
3	Falkirk	84,052	7,804	3,550	4,669	−1.2%
4	Greenock Morton	49,153	7,392	1,175	2,730	+59.1%
5	Hibernian	168,105	14,412	6,686	9,339	−8.1%
6	Livingston	31,766	6,505	787	1,764	−27.3%
7	Queen of the South	38,072	5,858	1,047	2,115	−23.4%
8	Raith Rovers	41,698	6,943	1,064	2,316	−10.9%
9	Rangers	815,841	50,349	37,182	45,324	+38.2%
10	St Mirren	63,876	5,933	2,321	3,548	−8.3%
	League total	1,331,484	50,349	468	7,397	−2.6%

Updated to games played on 1 May 2016

== Championship play-offs ==
Livingston, the second bottom team, entered into a 4-team playoff with the 2nd-4th placed teams in 2015–16 Scottish League One; Ayr United, Peterhead, and Stranraer.

=== Semi-finals ===
==== First leg ====
3 May 2016	Peterhead	1–4	Ayr United	Balmoor, Peterhead
20:00	McIntosh 35'	BBC Report	Donald 18'; Preston 41', 59'; Crawford 74'	Attendance: 807; Referee: Stephen Finnie

4 May 2016	Stranraer	5–2	Livingston	Stair Park, Stranraer
19:45	McGuigan 14', 70'; Stirling 17'; Gibson 40', 81'	BBC Report	White 10'; Buchanan 68'	Attendance: 589; Referee: John Beaton

==== Second leg ====
7 May 2016	Ayr United	2–1 (6–2 agg.)	Peterhead	Somerset Park, Ayr
15:00	Crawford 26'; Devlin 57'	BBC Report	Donald 31' (o.g.)	Attendance: 1,848; Referee: Crawford Allan

7 May 2016	Livingston	4–3 (a.e.t.) (6–8 agg.)	Stranraer	Almondvale Stadium, Livingston
15:00	Buchanan 18'; White 45+2'; Mullen 89'; Halkett 90+4'	BBC Report	Cairney 62'; Dick 109'; Longworth 120'	Attendance: 1,018; Referee: Craig Thomson

=== Final ===
The winners of the semi-finals, Ayr United and Stranraer, competed against one another over two legs, with the winner, Ayr, replacing Livingston and being promoted to the 2016–17 Scottish Championship.

==== First leg ====
11 May 2016	Stranraer	1–1	Ayr United	Stair Park, Stranraer
19:45	McGuigan 54'	BBC Report	Docherty 90+5'	Attendance: 1,652; Referee: Bobby Madden

==== Second leg ====
15 May 2016	Ayr United	0–0 (a.e.t.) (1–1 agg.) (3–1 p)	Stranraer	Somerset Park, Ayr
14:45		BBC Report		Attendance: 4,581; Referee: Andrew Dallas
	Penalties
	Preston (penalty scored); Trouten (penalty scored); Docherty (penalty missed); Graham (penalty scored)		Cairney (penalty missed); Longworth (penalty missed); Barron (penalty missed); Gibson (penalty scored)
