= Jesús García Tena =

Spanish footballer

Personal information
- Date of birth: 7 June 1990 (age 36)
- Place of birth: Terrassa, Spain
- Position: Defender

Youth career
- Juventus
- Espanyol

Senior career*
Years	Team	Apps	(Gls)
2009	Sabadell	1	(0)
2009–2010	Terrassa	13	(0)
2011–2012	Cuneo	7	(0)
2012–2013	Livingston	29	(3)
2013–2017	Hamilton Academical	67	(6)
2017–2018	Edinburgh City	21	(2)
2018–2019	Stenhousemuir	11	(0)
2019	Bonnyrigg Rose Athletic	0	(0)
2020-2021	Tranent Juniors		
- * Club domestic league appearances and goals

Jesús García Tena (born 7 June 1990) is a Spanish football coach and former professional player who played as a defender.

== Career ==
Born in Terrassa, Barcelona, Catalonia, García spent his early career in Spain and Italy with Juventus, Espanyol, Sabadell, Terrassa and Cuneo. He signed for Scottish club Livingston in August 2012. On 2 May 2013, it was announced that he was leaving the club after the 2012–13 season.

He signed a short-term contract with Hamilton Academical in September 2013, stating that he was "really happy" with the move. In December 2013 the contract was extended until the end of the 2013–14 season. In July 2014 his contract was again extended, before being extended again in January 2015, until May 2016. It was again extended for a further year in May 2016. He suffered a knee injury in the first game of the 2016–17 season, in a League Cup game; it was announced he would miss most of the season. He was released by Hamilton in April 2017. He later said that he had felt "frozen out" at the club following injury problems.

On 21 September 2017, García Tena signed for Edinburgh City on a contract until January 2018, having spent time on trial at the club. After one season with the side, he left the club in May 2018.

In June 2018 he began a role as head coach of the under-20s at Newtongrange Star.

He signed for Stenhousemuir for the 2018–19 season, leaving the club after six months in January 2019. He then made 2 Cup appearances for Bonnyrigg Rose Athletic in April 2019.

Tena signed for Tranent Juniors in 2020, but left the club in 2021.

== Career statistics ==
As of 28 November 2018

Appearances and goals by club, season and competition
Club	Season	League			National Cup		League Cup		Other		Total	
Club	Season	Division	Apps	Goals	Apps	Goals	Apps	Goals	Apps	Goals	Apps	Goals
Sabadell	2009–10	Segunda División B	1	0	–	–	–	–	–	–	1	0
Terrassa	2009–10	Segunda División B	13	0	–	–	–	–	–	–	13	0
Cuneo	2011–12	Lega Pro Seconda Divisione	7	0	–	–	–	–	–	–	7	0
Livingston	2012–13	Scottish First Division	29	3	1	0	1	0	0	0	31	3
Hamilton Academical	2013–14	Scottish Championship	18	1	0	0	0	0	4 (Note: Appearances in the Premiership play-offs)	0	22	1
Hamilton Academical	2014–15	Scottish Premiership	26	1	1	0	0	0	0	0	27	1
Hamilton Academical	2015–16	Scottish Premiership	23	4	1	0	1	0	0	0	25	4
Hamilton Academical	2016–17	Scottish Premiership	0	0	0	0	1	0	0	0	1	0
Hamilton Academical	Total		67	6	2	0	2	0	4	0	75	6
Edinburgh City	2017–18	Scottish League Two	21	0	1	0	0	0	0	0	22	0
Stenhousemuir	2018–19	Scottish League One	10	0	0	0	4	0	1	0	15	0
Career total			148	9	4	0	7	0	5	0	164	9

== Personal life ==
His younger brother Pol García Tena is also a footballer.
