= Louis Longridge =

Scottish footballer (born 1991)

Personal information
- Date of birth: 5 July 1991 (age 35)
- Place of birth: Glasgow, Scotland
- Height: 1.77 m (5 ft 10 in)
- Positions: Winger; striker

Team information
- Current team: Queen's Park
- Number: 7

Youth career
- Barrachnie
- Harmony Row

Senior career*
Years	Team	Apps	(Gls)
2012	Bo'ness United	?	(?)
2012–2018	Hamilton Academical	133	(14)
2016	→ Raith Rovers (loan)	13	(1)
2017–2018	→ Falkirk (loan)	7	(1)
2018	Falkirk	18	(6)
2018–2019	Dunfermline Athletic	22	(3)
2019–2020	Falkirk	24	(5)
2020–	Queen's Park	170	(10)
- * Club domestic league appearances and goals as of 4 May 2026

Louis Longridge (born 5 July 1991) is a Scottish professional footballer, who plays as a winger and striker for Scottish Championship club Queen's Park.

== Career ==
=== Hamilton Academical ===
Born in Glasgow, Longridge played youth football for Barrachnie and Harmony Row, before signing with Bo'ness United in February 2012. After signing for Hamilton Academical, Longridge made his debut in the Scottish Football League for them on 7 April 2012, in a 2–1 defeat against Raith Rovers. In May 2012, Longridge scored twice as Hamilton won the Reserve League Cup Final. He signed a new contract with Hamilton in June 2012, before signing a further one-year extension in May 2013.

In March 2013, he stated that the club was no longer in a relegation fight, and was aiming to get as high in the table as possible. In March 2014 he signed a new two-year contract extension with the club. He moved on loan to Raith Rovers in January 2016, until the end of the season.

=== Falkirk ===
In October 2017, he signed for Falkirk on an emergency loan deal until the start of January 2018, whereupon he signed a permanent deal until the end of the 2017–18 season. Longridge left Falkirk at the end of this contract, as the player and the club were unable to agree a new deal.

=== Dunfermline ===
In June 2018, Longridge signed for Dunfermline Athletic. He joined the club at the same time as his brother Jackson. After a year with the side, Longridge departed the club in May 2019.

=== Return to Falkirk ===
Longridge returned to Falkirk in August 2019, signing a short-term contract with the club. He left Falkirk at the end of the 2019–20 season.

=== Queen's Park ===
In August 2020, Longridge signed for Queen's Park.

== Career statistics ==
As of 27 March 2021

Appearances and goals by club, season and competition
Club	Season	League			Scottish Cup		League Cup		Other		Total	
Club	Season	Division	Apps	Goals	Apps	Goals	Apps	Goals	Apps	Goals	Apps	Goals
Hamilton Academical	2011–12	Scottish First Division	2	0	0	0	0	0	0	0	2	0
Hamilton Academical	2012–13	Scottish First Division	32	3	3	0	2	0	0	0	37	3
Hamilton Academical	2013–14	Scottish Championship	27	8	1	0	2	0	5 (Note: One appearance and a goal in the Scottish Challenge Cup; four appearances in the Premiership play-offs)	1	35	9
Hamilton Academical	2014–15	Scottish Premiership	32	0	1	0	4	2	—		37	2
Hamilton Academical	2015–16	Scottish Premiership	15	1	0	0	1	0	—		16	1
Hamilton Academical	2016–17	Scottish Premiership	16	1	1	0	5	2	2 (Note: Appearances in the Premiership play-offs)	0	24	3
Hamilton Academical	2017–18	Scottish Premiership	9	1	0	0	3	1	0	0	12	2
Hamilton Academical	Total		133	14	6	0	17	5	7	1	163	20
Raith Rovers (loan)	2015–16	Scottish Championship	13	1	0	0	0	0	2 (Note: Appearances in the Premiership play-offs)	0	15	1
Falkirk (loan)	2017–18	Scottish Championship	7	1	0	0	0	0	1	0	8	1
Falkirk	2017–18	Scottish Championship	18	7	3	0	0	0	0	0	21	7
Dunfermline Athletic	2018–19	Scottish Championship	22	3	0	0	5	1	2	2	29	6
Falkirk	2019–20	Scottish League One	24	5	2	0	0	0	2	1	28	6
Queens Park	2020–21	Scottish League Two	8	1	1	0	2	0	—		11	1
Career total			225	32	12	0	24	6	14	4	276	41

== Honours ==
Queen's Park

- Scottish Challenge Cup runner-up: 2024–25
