= 2015–16 Hamilton Academical F.C. season =

Hamilton Academical
2015–16 season
- Chairman: Les Gray
- Manager: Martin Canning
- Stadium: New Douglas Park
- Premiership: Tenth Place
- League Cup: Second Round
- Scottish Cup: Fourth Round
- Top goalscorer: League: Carlton Morris (8); All: Morris (8)
- Highest home attendance: 5,017 vs Celtic, Premiership, 26 February 2016
- Lowest home attendance: 1,516 vs Inverness CT, Premiership, 11 May 2016
- Average home league attendance: 4,387
| Home colours | Away colours |

The 2015–16 season was the club's second season in the Scottish Premiership, having been promoted from the Scottish Championship at the end of the 2013–14 season. Hamilton Academical also competed in the League Cup and the Scottish Cup.

== Results and fixtures ==
Win Draw Loss Postponed

=== Scottish Premiership ===
| 1 August 2015 1 | Hamilton Academical | 0–0 | Partick Thistle | New Douglas Park |
| 15:00 | | BBC Report | Frans (yellow card) 25' (yellow-red card) | Attendance: 2,872; Referee: Colvin |

| 8 August 2015 2 | Ross County | 2–0 | Hamilton Academical | Victoria Park |
| 15:00 | Curran 10', 41' | BBC Report | | Attendance: 3,479; Referee: Dallas |

| 15 August 2015 3 | Hamilton Academical | 4–0 | Dundee United | New Douglas Park |
| 15:00 | Crawford 19'; Lucas 36'; Morris 39'; Nadé 90+2' | BBC Report | | Attendance: 2,173; Referee: McLean |

| 22 August 2015 4 | Inverness Caledonian Thistle | 0–2 | Hamilton Academical | Caledonian Stadium |
| 15:00 | | BBC Report | Morris 18'; Longridge 90+1' | Attendance: 3,003; Referee: Anderson |

| 29 August 2015 5 | Hamilton Academical | 3–2 | Heart of Midlothian | New Douglas Park |
| 15:00 | Kurtaj 45'; Crawford 83'; García Tena 88' | BBC Report | King 53'; Paterson 71'; Paterson (red card) 77' | Attendance: Collum; Referee: 4,745 |

| 12 September 2015 6 | St Johnstone | 4–1 | Hamilton Academical | McDiarmid Park |
| 15:00 | Craig 22'; MacLean 25' (pen.), 43', 54' | BBC Report | Tagliapietra 67' | Attendance: 2,648; Referee: Dallas |

| 15 September 2015 7 | Aberdeen | 1–0 | Hamilton Academical | Pittodrie Stadium |
| 15:00 | Rooney 23' (pen.) | BBC Report | | Attendance: Allan; Referee: 13,246 |

| 19 September 2015 8 | Hamilton Academical | 1–0 | Motherwell | New Douglas Park |
| 15:00 | Imrie 72' | BBC Report | | Attendance: 3,325; Referee: Thomson |

| 26 September 2015 9 | Kilmarnock | 1–2 | Hamilton Academical | Rugby Park |
| 15:00 | Kiltie 34'; Ashcroft (yellow card) 90+4' (red card) | BBC Report | Imrie 49'; Crawford 64' | Attendance: 3,308; Referee: Robertson |

| 4 October 2015 10 | Hamilton Academical | 1–2 | Celtic | New Douglas Park |
| | Kurtaj 4' | BBC Report | Boyata 26'; Griffiths 31' | Attendance: 4,910; Referee: Steven McLean |

| 17 October 2015 11 | Hamilton Academical | 1–1 | Dundee | New Douglas Park |
| 15:00 | MacKinnon (red card) 61'; Imrie 87' (yellow card) 87' | Report | Etxabeguren (yellow card) 16'; Holt 47'; Harkins (yellow card) 82' | Attendance: 2,862; Referee: Collum |

| 24 October 2015 12 | Partick Thistle | 1–1 | Hamilton Academical | Firhill Stadium |
| 15:00 | Welsh (yellow card) 7'; Pogba 60'; Muirhead (yellow card) 87' | Report | Gillespie (yellow card) 35'; Lucas (red card) 45+4' imrie 78'; Canning (yellow card) 84' | Attendance: 3,122; Referee: Anderson |

| 31 October 2015 13 | Hamilton Academical | 2–4 | St Johnstone | New Douglas Park |
| 15:00 | Garcia Tena 81', 89' (pen.) | BBC Report | Cummins 40', 49'; Wotherspoon 63'; O'Halloran 67' | Attendance: 2,216; Referee: Clancy |

| 7 November 2015 14 | Heart of Midlothian | 2–0 | Hamilton Academical | Tynecastle Stadium |
| 15:00 | Buaben 27'; Djoum 38' | BBC Report | | Attendance: 16,121; Referee: Madden |

| 22 November 2015 15 | Hamilton Academical | 1–1 | Aberdeen | New Douglas Park |
| 12:30 | Imrie 70' | BBC Report | McLean 4' | Attendance: 2,434; Referee: Collum |

| 28 November 2015 16 | Dundee United | 1–2 | Hamilton Academical | Tannadice Park |
| 15:00 | McKay 29' | BBC Report | Tagliapietra 43'; Gordon 79' | Attendance: 5,788; Referee: Finnie |

| 12 December 2015 17 | Hamilton Academical | 1–3 | Ross County | New Douglas Park |
| 15:00 | Kurtaj 26'; Sendels-White (yellow card) 34' | Report | Davies (yellow card) 20'; Curaan 58'; Woods (yellow card) 72'; Murdoch 86'; Boyce 90' | Attendance: 2,120; Referee: (Scotland) Willie Collum |

| 19 December 2015 18 | Dundee | 4–0 | Hamilton Academical | Dens Park |
| 15:00 | Hemmings 5' 21' 26'; Stewart 19' (yellow card) 52' | Report | Gillespie (yellow card) 70' | Attendance: 4,568; Referee: (Scotland) Don Robertson |

| 26 December 2015 19 | Hamilton Academical | 0–1 | Kilmarnock | New Douglas Park |
| 15:00 | Morris (yellow card) 28'; Jesús García Tena (yellow card) 79' | Report | Magennis (yellow card) 22'; Obadeyi 69'; Smith (yellow card) 76'; O'Hara (yellow card) 90' | Attendance: 2,006; Referee: (Scotland) Kevin Clancy |

| 30 December 2015 20 | Hamilton Academical | 3–4 | Inverness Caledonian Thistle | New Douglas Park |
| 15:00 | Gillespie (yellow card) 25'; Morris 66'; Gordon 81'; Imrie (yellow card) 88' Nadé 90' | Report | Tansey 18' (yellow card) 84' (goal) 88'; Draper (yellow card) 26'; Polworth 51' 90'; Raven (yellow card) 71' | Attendance: 1,555; Referee: (Scotland) Euan Anderson |

| 2 January 2016 21 | Motherwell | 3–3 | Hamilton Academical | Fir Park |
| 15:00 | McDonald 9' 46'; Grimshaw (yellow card) 38'; Law (yellow card) 49'; Moult 57'; Lasley (yellow card) 70' (yellow-red card); McManus (yellow card) 87' | Report | Lucas 25'; MacKinnon 28'; Imrie (yellow card) 50'; Crawford (yellow card) 52' (goal) 90' (pen.); Kurakins (yellow card) 78' | Attendance: 5,734; Referee: (Scotland) Greg Aitken |

| 16 January 2016 22 | St Johnstone | 0–0 | Hamilton Academical | McDiarmid Park |
| 15:00 | | Report | Lucas (yellow card) 47'; Gillespie (yellow card) 78' | Attendance: 2,685; Referee: (Scotland) Andrew Dallas |

| 19 January 2016 23 | Celtic | 8–1 | Hamilton Academical | Celtic Park |
| 19:45 | Lustig 4'; Bitton 9'; Rogic 10'; Griffiths 22' 34' 54'; Forrest 53'; McGregor 89' | Report | Brophy 73' | Attendance: 45,659; Referee: (Scotland) Craig Thomson (referee) |

| 24 January 2016 24 | Hamilton Academical | 0–0 | Heart of Midlothian | New Douglas Park |
| 12:45 | Devlin (yellow card) 17'; MacKinnon (yellow card) 41'; Jesús García Tena (red card) 87' | Report | Öztürk (yellow card) 39'; Buaben (yellow card) 39'; Igor (red card) 40' | Attendance: 2,684; Referee: (Scotland) Bobby Madden |

| 30 January 2016 25 | Kilmarnock | 0–1 | Hamilton Academical | Rugby Park |
| 15:00 | Ashcroft (yellow card) 18'; Balatoni (yellow card) 62'; Hamill (yellow card) 73' | Report | Morris (yellow card) 62' (goal) 71'; MacKinnon (yellow card) 80' | Attendance: 3,076; Referee: (Scotland) Stephen Finnie |

| 13 February 2016 26 | Hamilton Academical | 0–0 | Dundee United | New Douglas Park |
| 15:00 | Devlin (yellow card) 65' (yellow-red card) | Report | | Attendance: 3,902; Referee: (Scotland) Steven McLean (referee) |

| 20 February 2016 27 | Ross County | 2–1 | Hamilton Academical | Global Energy Stadium |
| 15:00 | Schalk 45+1'; Reckford (red card) 47'; Davies (yellow card) 73'; McShane 78'; Quinn (yellow card) 84' | Report | Jesús García Tena (yellow card) 13'; Kurakins (yellow card) 45'; Imrie 66' | Attendance: 3,059; Referee: (Scotland) Greg Aitken |

| 26 February 2016 28 | Hamilton Academical | 1–1 | Celtic | New Douglas Park |
| 19:45 | Gordon (yellow card) 49'; Lucas (yellow card) 66'; Brophy 73'; MacKinnon (yellow card) 80'; Imrie (yellow card) 85' | Report | Griffiths 35' (pen.); Boyata (red card) 42' | Attendance: 5,017; Referee: (Scotland) Craig Thomson (referee) |

| 5 March 2016 29 | Hamilton Academical | 0–1 | Motherwell | New Douglas Park |
| 15:00 | Gordon (yellow card) 7'; Kurakins (yellow card) 9'; Kurtaj (yellow card) 10'; McGovern (yellow card) 79'; Carlton Morris (yellow card) 85' | Report | Laing 45'; Johnson (yellow card) 77' | Attendance: 3,755; Referee: (Scotland) Kevin Clancy |

| 12 March 2016 30 | Inverness Caledonian Thistle | 0–1 | Hamilton Academical | Tulloch Caledonian Stadium |
| 15:00 | Devine (yellow card) 49' | Report | Carlton Morris 59'; Imrie (yellow card) 63'; Gillespie (yellow card) 63'; McGovern (yellow card) 90+4' | Attendance: 3,510; Referee: (Scotland) Steven McLean (referee) |

| 19 March 2016 31 | Hamilton Academical | 1–2 | Partick Thistle | New Douglas Park |
| 15:00 | Kurtaj (yellow card) 9'; Docherty 10'; Lucas (yellow card) 17' | Report | Pogba 50'; Danny Seaborne (yellow card) 70'; Edwards 84' | Attendance: 3,055; Referee: (Scotland) Willie Collum |

| 3 April 2016 32 | Aberdeen | 3–0 | Hamilton Academical | Pittodrie Stadium |
| 12:30 | Church 5'; McGinn 15'; McLean 33'; Storie (yellow card) 90+2' | Report | Agustien (yellow card) 24'; Imrie (yellow card) 46'; Crawford (yellow card) 87' | Attendance: 12,509; Referee: (Scotland) Kevin Clancy |

| 9 April 2016 33 | Hamilton Academical | 2–1 | Dundee | New Douglas Park |
| 15:00 | Crawford 30'; Jesús García Tena 41' (pen.); Imrie (yellow card) 42'; Carlton Morris (yellow card) 64'; Docherty (yellow card) 84' | Report | Julen Etxabeguren (yellow card) 19'; Harkins 63'; O'Dea (yellow card) 84' | Attendance: 2,764; Referee: (Scotland) John Beaton |

| 24 April 2016 34 | Dundee United | 1–3 | Hamilton Academical | Tannadice Park |
| 15:00 | Dow (yellow card) 43'; Durnan (yellow card) 47'; Murray 89' | Report | Gillespie 12'; Carlton Morris (yellow card) 23' (goal) 52' 73'; Crawford (yellow card) 50'; Imrie (yellow card) 76' | Attendance: 5,884; Referee: (Scotland) Steven McLean (referee) |

| 30 April 2016 35 | Hamilton Academical | 0–4 | Kilmarnock | New Douglas Park |
| 15:00 | MacKinnon (yellow card) 11'; Imrie (yellow card) 55'; Lucas (yellow card) 57'; Carlton Morris (yellow card) 65'; Gordon (yellow card) 67'; Kurakins (yellow card) 69' | Report | Kiltie 11' 32'; O'Hara (yellow card) 34'; Boyd 58' (pen.); Magennis 77' | Attendance: 3,595; Referee: (Scotland) Craig Thomson (referee) |

| 7 May 2016 36 | Dundee | 0–1 | Hamilton Academical | Dens Park |
| 15:00 | Meggatt (yellow card) 60'; Gadzhalov (yellow card) 83' | Report | Carlton Morris 8' (yellow card) 60'; Imrie (yellow card) 42'; Kurtaj (yellow card) 42'; Jesús García Tena (yellow card) 53'; Redmond (yellow card) 90'; Gordon (yellow card) 90+1' | Attendance: 4,757; Referee: (Scotland) Steven McLean (referee) |

| 11 May 2016 37 | Hamilton Academical | 0–1 | Inverness Caledonian Thistle | New Douglas Park |
| 19:45 | MacKinnon (yellow card) 73' (yellow-red card); Gillespie (yellow card) 83' | Report | Devine 41'; Warren (yellow card) 58'; Polworth (yellow card) 85' | Attendance: 1,516; Referee: (Scotland) Stephen Finnie |

| 14 May 2016 38 | Partick Thistle | 2–2 | Hamilton Academical | Firhill Stadium |
| 12:30 | Doolan 3'; Amoo 19'; Miller (yellow card) 67' | Report | Brophy 10' (pen.) 20' | Attendance: 2,971; Referee: (Scotland) Alan Muir |

=== Scottish League Cup ===
| 25 August 2015 Round 2 | Raith Rovers | 2–1 | Hamilton Academical | Stark's Park |
| 19:45 | Davidson 3'; Benedictus 81' | BBC Report | Nadé 66' | Attendance: 1,470; Referee: Robertson |

=== Scottish Cup ===
| 9 January 2016 Round 4 | Annan Athletic | 4–1 | Hamilton Academical | Galabank |
| 15:00 | Matty Flynn 6'; Todd 47' (yellow card) 76'; Rabin Omar 66' 71' (yellow card) 73' | Report | Docherty 65' | Attendance: 817; Referee: (Scotland) Barry Cook |

== Squad statistics ==
During the 2015–16 season, Hamilton Academical have used thirty different players in competitive games. The table below shows the number of appearances and goals scored by each player. Ziggy Gordon started all 40 matches.

=== Appearances ===
As of 14 May 2016

| No. | Pos | Nat | Player | Total | | Premiership | | League Cup | | Scottish Cup | |
| No. | Pos | Nat | Player | Apps | Goals | Apps | Goals | Apps | Goals | Apps | Goals |
|---|---|---|---|---|---|---|---|---|---|---|---|
| 1 | GK | (Northern Ireland) NIR | Michael McGovern | 39 | 0 | 37 | 0 | 1 | 0 | 1 | 0 |
| 2 | DF | (Scotland) SCO | Ziggy Gordon | 40 | 2 | 38 | 2 | 1 | 0 | 1 | 0 |
| 3 | DF | (Latvia) LVA | Antons Kurakins | 36 | 0 | 35 | 0 | 1 | 0 | 0 | 0 |
| 4 | DF | (Scotland) SCO | Michael Devlin | 17 | 0 | 16 | 0 | 0 | 0 | 1 | 0 |
| 5 | DF | (Scotland) SCO | Martin Canning | 3 | 0 | 1+2 | 0 | 0 | 0 | 0 | 0 |
| 6 | MF | (Scotland) SCO | Grant Gillespie | 31 | 1 | 28+2 | 1 | 0 | 0 | 1 | 0 |
| 7 | MF | (Scotland) SCO | Dougie Imrie | 36 | 6 | 34+1 | 6 | 0+1 | 0 | 0 | 0 |
| 8 | MF | (Northern Ireland) NIR | Chris Turner | 3 | 0 | 3 | 0 | 0 | 0 | 0 | 0 |
| 8 | FW | (France) FRA | Oumar Diaby | 6 | 0 | 1+5 | 0 | 0 | 0 | 0 | 0 |
| 9 | FW | (Brazil) BRA | Alexandre D'Acol | 16 | 0 | 3+12 | 0 | 0 | 0 | 1 | 0 |
| 11 | MF | (Scotland) SCO | Ali Crawford | 35 | 5 | 32+1 | 5 | 1 | 0 | 1 | 0 |
| 12 | MF | (Germany) GER | Gramoz Kurtaj | 35 | 3 | 28+6 | 3 | 1 | 0 | 0 | 0 |
| 14 | FW | (England) ENG | Carlton Morris | 33 | 8 | 27+5 | 8 | 0 | 0 | 0+1 | 0 |
| 15 | MF | (Curaçao) CUW | Kemy Agustien | 2 | 0 | 1+1 | 0 | 0 | 0 | 0 | 0 |
| 15 | DF | (Northern Ireland) NIR | Jamie Sendles-White | 7 | 0 | 4+3 | 0 | 0 | 0 | 0 | 0 |
| 16 | MF | (Scotland) SCO | Craig Watson | 1 | 0 | 0+1 | 0 | 0 | 0 | 0 | 0 |
| 17 | MF | (Scotland) SCO | Louis Longridge | 16 | 1 | 6+9 | 1 | 1 | 0 | 0 | 0 |
| 18 | FW | (Scotland) SCO | Darian MacKinnon | 33 | 0 | 30+1 | 0 | 1 | 0 | 1 | 0 |
| 20 | FW | (Scotland) SCO | Eamonn Brophy | 15 | 4 | 7+7 | 4 | 0 | 0 | 1 | 0 |
| 21 | MF | (Scotland) SCO | Greg Docherty | 36 | 2 | 16+18 | 1 | 1 | 0 | 1 | 1 |
| 22 | MF | (Scotland) SCO | Darren Lyon | 13 | 0 | 9+3 | 0 | 0 | 0 | 0+1 | 0 |
| 24 | MF | (Spain) ESP | Jesús García Tena | 25 | 4 | 20+3 | 4 | 1 | 0 | 1 | 0 |
| 26 | GK | (Scotland) SCO | Alan Martin | 1 | 0 | 1 | 0 | 0 | 0 | 0 | 0 |
| 27 | FW | (France) FRA | Christian Nadé | 18 | 3 | 4+13 | 2 | 1 | 1 | 0 | 0 |
| 28 | FW | (Germany) GER | Christopher Mandiangu | 1 | 0 | 0 | 0 | 0 | 0 | 0+1 | 0 |
| 28 | MF | (England) ENG | Daniel Redmond | 12 | 0 | 1+10 | 0 | 0 | 0 | 1 | 0 |
| 30 | MF | (Scotland) SCO | Steven Boyd | 6 | 0 | 2+3 | 0 | 0+1 | 0 | 0 | 0 |
| 33 | MF | (Scotland) SCO | Ronan Hughes | 2 | 0 | 0+2 | 0 | 0 | 0 | 0 | 0 |
| 35 | FW | (Scotland) SCO | Ross Cunningham | 1 | 0 | 0+1 | 0 | 0 | 0 | 0 | 0 |
| 44 | DF | (Brazil) BRA | Lucas | 35 | 3 | 34+0 | 3 | 1 | 0 | 0 | 0 |

== Team statistics ==
=== League table ===
| Pos | Team | Pld | W | D | L | GF | GA | GD | Pts | Qualification or relegation (Note: Teams play each other three times (33 matches), before the league is split into two groups (the top six and the bottom six).) |
|---|---|---|---|---|---|---|---|---|---|---|
| 8 | Dundee | 38 | 11 | 15 | 12 | 53 | 57 | −4 | 48 | |
| 9 | Partick Thistle | 38 | 12 | 10 | 16 | 41 | 50 | −9 | 46 | |
| 10 | Hamilton Academical | 38 | 11 | 10 | 17 | 42 | 63 | −21 | 43 | |
| 11 | Kilmarnock (O) | 38 | 9 | 9 | 20 | 41 | 64 | −23 | 36 | Qualification for the Premiership play-off final |
| 12 | Dundee United (Note: Dundee United were deducted three points for fielding an ineligible player in their win over Inverness Caledonian Thistle on 6 May 2016.) (R) | 38 | 8 | 7 | 23 | 45 | 70 | −25 | 28 | Relegation to the Scottish Championship |

Source: Scottish Premiership, Soccerway (first phase), Soccerway (second phase)
Rules for classification: 1) Points; 2) Goal difference; 3) Goals scored; 4) Play-off (only if deciding champion, UEFA competitions qualification and second stage group allocation).
(O) Play-off winners; (R) Relegated

=== Division summary ===
| Round | 1 | 2 | 3 | 4 | 5 | 6 | 7 | 8 | 9 | 10 | 11 | 12 | 13 | 14 | 15 | 16 | 17 | 18 | 19 | 20 | 21 | 22 | 23 | 24 | 25 | 26 | 27 | 28 | 29 | 30 | 31 | 32 | 33 | 34 | 35 | 36 | 37 | 38 |
|---|---|---|---|---|---|---|---|---|---|---|---|---|---|---|---|---|---|---|---|---|---|---|---|---|---|---|---|---|---|---|---|---|---|---|---|---|---|---|
| Ground | H | A | H | A | H | A | A | A | A | H | H | A | H | A | H | A | H | A | H | H | A | A | A | H | A | H | A | H | H | A | H | A | H | A | H | A | H | A |
| Result | D | L | W | W | W | L | L | W | W | L | D | D | L | L | D | W | L | L | L | L | D | D | L | D | W | D | L | D | L | W | L | L | W | W | L | W | L | D |
| Position | 6 | 10 | 5 | 5 | 5 | 6 | 5 | 4 | 4 | 5 | 5 | 6 | 6 | 6 | 5 | 5 | 7 | 8 | 10 | 10 | 10 | 10 | 10 | 10 | 10 | 10 | 10 | 10 | 10 | 10 | 10 | 10 | 10 | 10 | 10 | 10 | 10 | 10 |

Updated to match(es) played on 14 May 2016. Source:
A = Away; H = Home; W = Win; D = Draw; L = Loss

=== Management statistics ===
| Name | From | To | P | W | D | L | Win% (Note: Win% is the percentage of matches won rounded to two decimal places.) |
|---|---|---|---|---|---|---|---|
| Martin Canning | 1 August 2015 | Present | 40 | 11 | 10 | 19 | 27.50 |

== Transfers ==
=== In ===
| Player | From | Fee |
|---|---|---|
| (Latvia) Antons Kurakins | (Latvia) FK Ventspils | Free |
| (France) Christian Nadé | (Scotland) Raith Rovers | Free |
| (Germany) Gramoz Kurtaj | (Czech Republic) Banik Most | Free |
| (Northern Ireland) Chris Turner | (Scotland) Dumbarton | Free |
| (Scotland) Alan Martin | (Scotland) Clyde | Free |
| (England) Carlton Morris | (England) Norwich City | Loan |
| (Brazil) Alex D'Acol | (Greece) AEK Athens | Free |
| (Northern Ireland) Jamie Sendles-White | (England) Queens Park Rangers | Free |

=== Out ===
| Player | To | Fee |
|---|---|---|
| (Scotland) Stephen Hendrie | (England) West Ham United | Undisclosed |
| (Netherlands) Nigel Hasselbaink | (Netherlands) Excelsior | Free |
| (England) Jon Routledge | (Scotland) Dumbarton | Free |
| (Scotland) Darren Smith | (Scotland) Livingston | Free |
| (Scotland) Blair Currie | (Scotland) Annan Athletic | Free |
| Jason Scotland | (Scotland) Stenhousemuir | Free |
| (Czech Republic) Nico Sumsky | (Scotland) Airdrieonians | Loan |
| (Scotland) Kieran MacDonald | (Scotland) East Fife | Free |
| (Scotland) Daniel Armstrong | (England) Wolverhampton Wanderers | Free |
