= Martin Canning =

Scottish footballer and coach

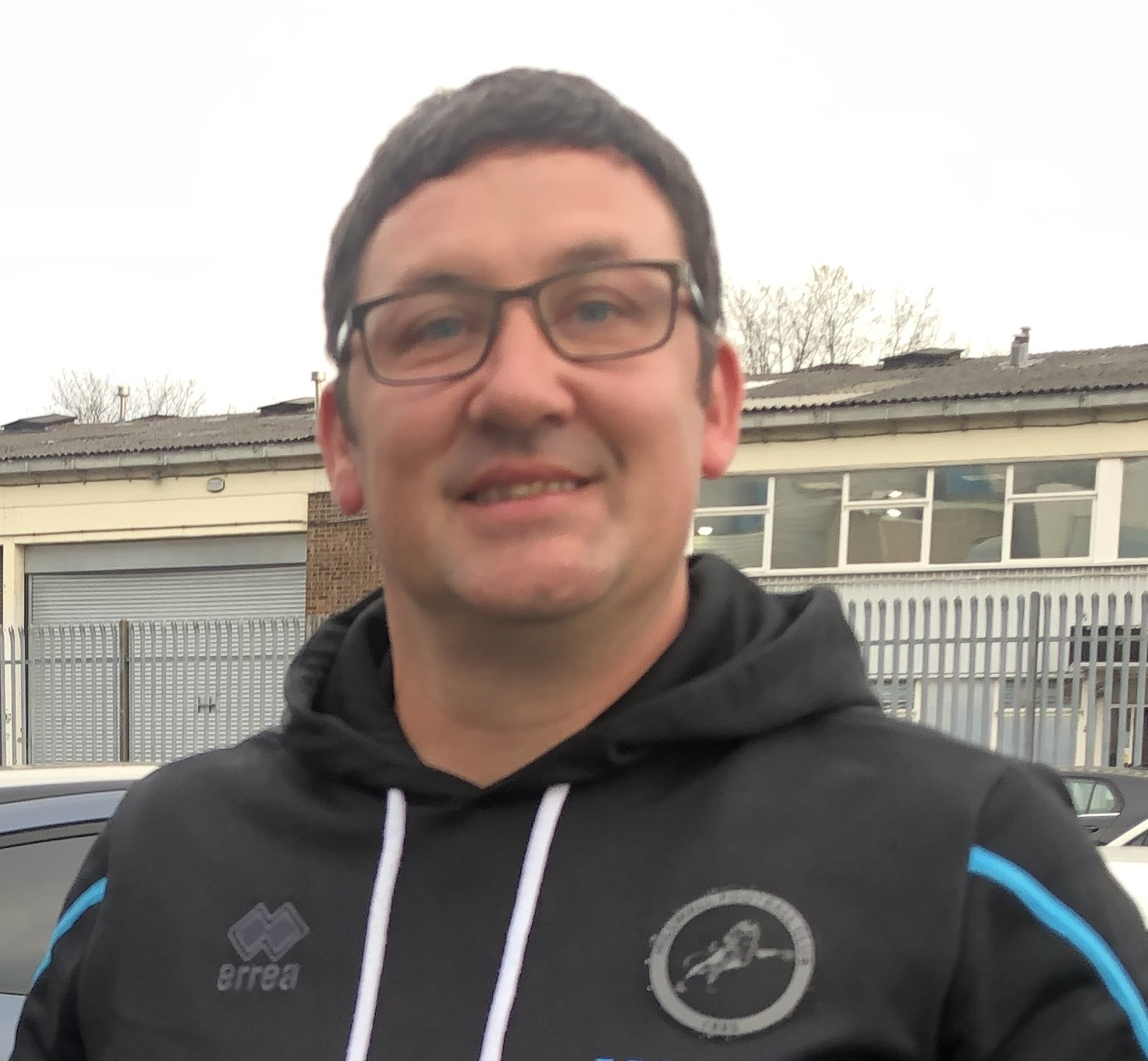
- Canning in 2025.

Personal information
- Date of birth: 3 December 1981 (age 44)
- Place of birth: Glasgow, Scotland
- Position: Defender

Team information
- Current team: Millwall (assistant head coach)

Youth career
- Clydebank

Senior career*
Years	Team	Apps	(Gls)
1999–2006	Ross County	111	(9)
2001–2002	→ Peterhead (loan)	21	(0)
2006–2008	Gretna	41	(1)
2008	Hibernian	12	(0)
2008–2017	Hamilton Academical	215	(8)
Total		400	(18)

Managerial career
- 2015: Hamilton Academical (caretaker)
- 2015–2019: Hamilton Academical
- 2022: Sunderland (caretaker)
- * Club domestic league appearances and goals

Martin Canning (born 3 December 1981) is a Scottish football player and coach. He is currently assistant head coach at Millwall.

During his playing career, Canning played as a central defender for Ross County, Peterhead, Gretna, Hibernian and Hamilton Academical.

== Playing career ==
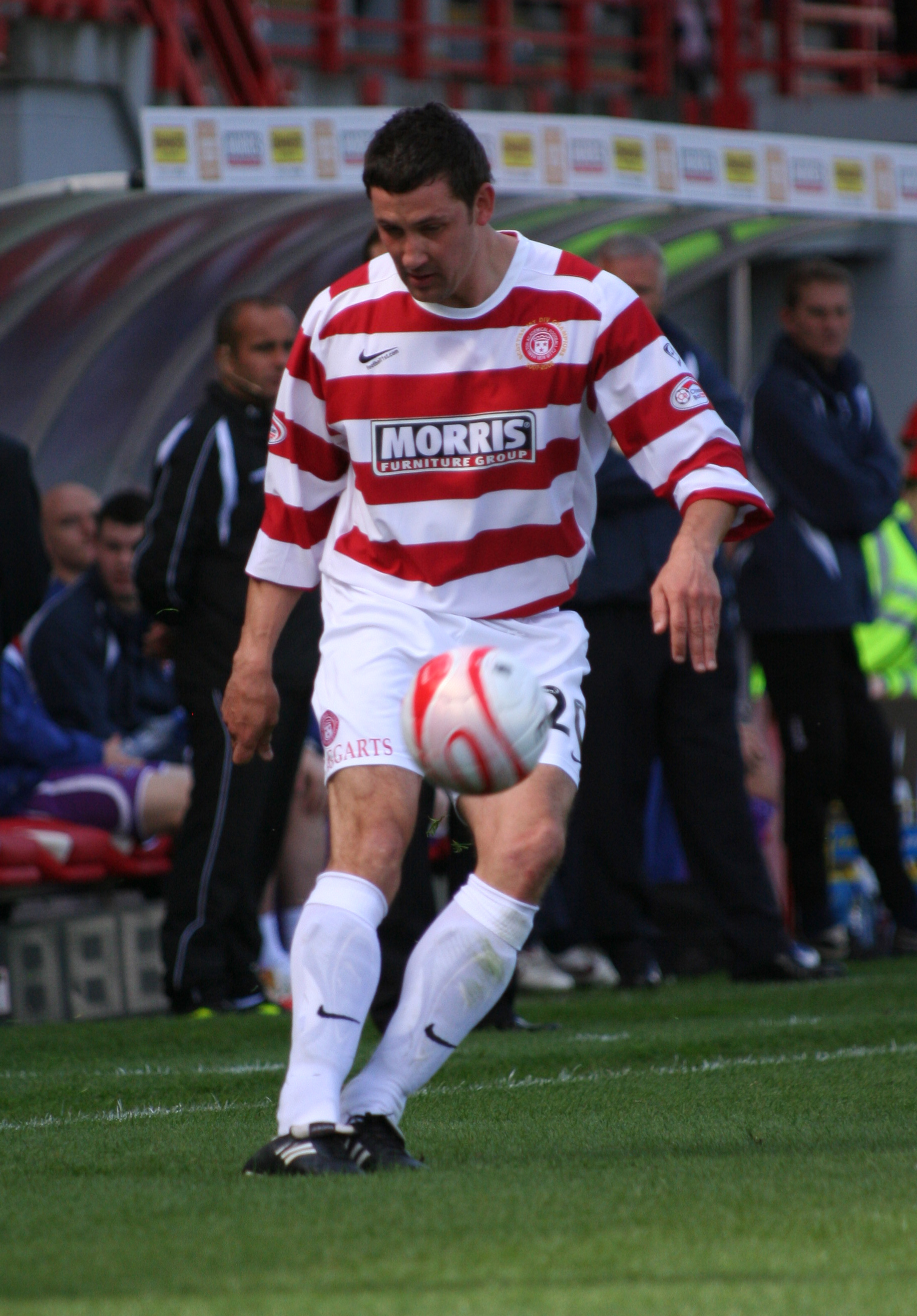
Canning playing for Hamilton Academical.

Canning became Gretna's record signing in January 2006 after joining from Ross County in a £60,000 deal. He made 46 appearances for Gretna, scoring once against Livingston, and helped them to promotion to the Scottish Premier League in the 2006–07 season. He was cup tied for their run to the 2006 Scottish Cup Final.

His contract with Gretna was terminated by mutual consent on 31 January 2008 due to the ensuing financial crisis at Gretna. Canning had to waive money he was due by Gretna to ensure that he was released from his contract and he was subsequently named in a creditors list published by Gretna's administrator in April 2008.

In February 2008, Canning signed a 16-month contract on 16 February 2008 with Hibernian after impressing in two reserve games while on trial. Canning made 12 league appearances for Hibs, but was released on 1 September 2008 to make way for new signing Souleymane Bamba. Canning then signed for Hamilton Academical on the same day.

Canning started coaching Hamilton's under-17 team, while continuing his playing career, in the 2012–13 season. He signed a new one-year contract with Hamilton in May 2013. A year later, he was part of the Accies team which won promotion to the Scottish Premiership, via a play-off win over his previous club Hibernian. Canning maintained his playing registration after being appointed Hamilton manager in 2015. Despite only making three first team appearances in the 2015–16 season due to injury, he extended his playing contract by another year in May 2016.

== Coaching career ==
Canning became interim player-manager of Hamilton Academical in January 2015, after Alex Neil left to join Norwich City. He was appointed manager on a permanent basis later that month, despite having lost all three matches as caretaker manager.

Hamilton finished 11th in the 2016–17 Scottish Premiership, then avoided relegation by winning a play-off against Dundee United. Hamilton again avoided relegation in 2017/18 by finishing in 10th place. Canning left Hamilton in January 2019 by mutual consent.

Since departing Hamilton, Canning has been at Real Betis, Celtic, Leicester City, Preston North End, Aberdeen and Sunderland to assist with coaching.

In August 2019, Canning took on the role as Head of Coaching at North Kelvin United on an interim basis. In November 2019, he was appointed permanently.

Canning was appointed assistant manager of Stoke City in September 2022. He left Stoke in December 2023.

In December 2024, Canning was appointed assistant head coach of Championship side Millwall, once again supporting the newly appointed Alex Neil.

== Career statistics ==
Appearances and goals by club, season and competition
Club	Season	League			National Cup		League Cup		Other		Total	
Club	Season	Division	Apps	Goals	Apps	Goals	Apps	Goals	Apps	Goals	Apps	Goals
Ross County	1999–2000	Scottish Second Division	6	0	0	0	0	0	2 (Note: Appearances in Scottish Challenge Cup)	0	2	0
Ross County	2000–01	Scottish First Division	6	1	0	0	0	0	0	0	6	1
Ross County	2001–02	Scottish First Division	7	0	0	0	0	0	0	0	7	0
Ross County	2002–03	Scottish First Division	25	2	0	0	3	0	2	0	30	2
Ross County	2003–04	Scottish First Division	15	0	0	0	0	0	0	0	15	0
Ross County	2004–05	Scottish First Division	33	4	3	0	2	0	4	1	42	5
Ross County	2005–06	Scottish First Division	19	2	1	0	2	0	2	0	24	2
Ross County	Total		111	9	4	0	7	0	10	1	132	10
Peterhead (loan)	2001–02	Scottish Third Division	21	0	0	0	0	0	0	0	21	0
Gretna	2005–06	Scottish Second Division	6	0	0	0	0	0	0	0	6	0
Gretna	2006–07	Scottish First Division	34	1	2	0	0	0	3 (Note: One Appearance in Scottish Challenge Cup and two in UEFA Cup)	0	39	1
Gretna	2007–08	Scottish Premier League	1	0	0	0	0	0	0	0	1	0
Gretna	Total		41	1	2	0	0	0	3	0	46	1
Hibernian	2007–08	Scottish Premier League	11	0	0	0	0	0	0	0	11	0
Hibernian	2008–09	Scottish Premier League	1	0	0	0	0	0	1 (Note: Appearance in UEFA Intertoto Cup)	0	2	0
Hibernian	Total		12	0	0	0	0	0	3	0	13	0
Hamilton Academical	2008–09	Scottish Premier League	30	1	2	0	0	0	0	0	32	1
Hamilton Academical	2009–10	Scottish Premier League	37	1	2	0	1	0	0	0	40	1
Hamilton Academical	2010–11	Scottish Premier League	23	0	2	0	1	0	0	0	26	0
Hamilton Academical	2011–12	Scottish First Division	32	1	2	0	1	0	1	0	36	1
Hamilton Academical	2012–13	Scottish First Division	33	1	3	0	2	0	0	0	38	1
Hamilton Academical	2013–14	Scottish Championship	34	1	1	0	3	0	4 (Note: Appearances in Scottish Championship play-offs)	0	42	1
Hamilton Academical	2014–15	Scottish Premiership	23	3	1	0	3	0	0	0	27	3
Hamilton Academical	2015–16	Scottish Premiership	3	0	0	0	0	0	0	0	3	0
Hamilton Academical	Total		215	8	13	0	11	0	5	0	244	8
Career total			400	18	19	0	18	0	19	1	456	19

== Managerial statistics ==
As of match played 27 August 2022

Managerial record by team and tenure
Team	Nat	From	To	Record							
Team	Nat	From	To	G	W	D	L	GF	GA	GD	Win %
Hamilton Academical (caretaker)	(Scotland)	9 January 2015	23 January 2015	3	0	0	3	2	10	−8	0.00
Hamilton Academical	(Scotland)	23 January 2015	29 January 2019	176	42	44	90	185	294	−109	23.86
Sunderland (caretaker)	(England)	26 August 2022	30 August 2022	1	0	0	1	0	1	−1	0.00
Total				180	42	44	94	187	305	−118	23.33

== Honours ==
- Scottish Premiership Manager of the Month: November 2017
