= Gramoz Kurtaj =

German footballer (born 1991)

Personal information
- Date of birth: 30 April 1991 (age 35)
- Place of birth: Pristina, SFR Yugoslavia
- Height: 1.83 m (6 ft 0 in)
- Position: Midfielder

Youth career
- 2006–2010: Hertha BSC II

Senior career*
Years	Team	Apps	(Gls)
2010–2012	Hertha BSC II	50	(2)
2012–2013	TSG Neustrelitz	29	(4)
2013–2014	Carl Zeiss Jena	28	(1)
2014–2015	Baník Most	30	(6)
2015–2017	Hamilton Academical	48	(3)
2017	SHB Da Nang	8	(2)
2019	Thanh Hoa	15	(6)
2020–2021	Gjilani	8	(1)
2021	Nam Dinh	1	(2)
2021	Dong A Thanh Hoa	10	(2)
2022–2023	TSB Flensburg	4	(0)
Total		231	(29)
- * Club domestic league appearances and goals

Gramoz Kurtaj (born 30 April 1991) is a Kosovan football manager and former player who played as a midfielder.

== Early and personal life ==
Kurtaj was born in Pristina, SFR Yugoslavia. When Kosovo started playing international matches in 2016, Kurtaj said he had made himself available for selection by the national team.

He is friends with ex-Hamilton player Tomáš Černý.

== Career ==
Kurtaj spent his early career in Germany with Hertha BSC II, TSG Neustrelitz and Carl Zeiss Jena, and in the Czech Republic with Baník Most. In July 2015 he was one of four players to sign for Scottish club Hamilton Academical. Kurtaj scored his first Hamilton goal four minutes into a 2–1 defeat to champions Celtic, scoring a header to make it 1–0 Hamilton at the time. He was released by Hamilton at the end of the 2016–17 season.

== Style of play ==
Kurtaj has been compared to ex-Hamilton player Tony Andreu.

== Career statistics ==
As of match played 28 July 2019

Appearances and goals by club, season and competition
Club	Season	League			National cup		League cup		Other		Total	
Club	Season	Division	Apps	Goals	Apps	Goals	Apps	Goals	Apps	Goals	Apps	Goals
Hertha BSC II	2010–11	Regionalliga Nord	28	0	—		—		—		28	0
Hertha BSC II	2011–12	Regionalliga Nord	22	2	—		—		—		22	2
Hertha BSC II	Total		50	2	0	0	0	0	0	0	50	2
TSG Neustrelitz	2012–13	Regionalliga Nordost	29	4	0	0	—		0	0	29	4
Carl Zeiss Jena	2013–14	Regionalliga Nordost	28	1	0	0	—		0	0	28	1
Baník Most	2014–15	Národní Liga	30	6	0	0	—		0	0	30	6
Hamilton Academical	2015–16	Scottish Premiership	34	3	0	0	1	0	—		35	3
Hamilton Academical	2016–17	Scottish Premiership	14	0	3	0	0	0	—		17	0
Hamilton Academical	Total		48	3	3	0	1	0	0	0	52	3
Đà Nẵng	2017	V.League 1	7	2	0	0	—		—		7	2
Thanh Hóa	2019	V.League 1	15	6	1	1	–					
Career total			208	25	4	1	1	0	0	0	212	26
