= Ali Crawford =

Scottish footballer (born 1991)

Personal information
- Full name: Alister Crawford
- Date of birth: 30 July 1991 (age 35)
- Place of birth: Lanark, Scotland
- Height: 5 ft 7 in (1.70 m)
- Position: Midfielder

Team information
- Current team: Hamilton Academical
- Number: 26

Youth career
- 1995–2000: Carluke Milton Rovers
- 2000–2006: Heart of Midlothian
- 2006–2009: Hamilton Academical

Senior career*
Years	Team	Apps	(Gls)
2009–2018	Hamilton Academical	227	(31)
2010	→ Bo'ness United (loan)		
2018–2019	Doncaster Rovers	36	(3)
2019–2022	Bolton Wanderers	33	(1)
2021	→ Tranmere Rovers (loan)	9	(0)
2021–2022	→ St Johnstone (loan)	14	(1)
2022–2024	St Johnstone	30	(4)
2023	→ Greenock Morton (loan)	12	(0)
2024–2026	Greenock Morton	32	(3)
2026–	Hamilton Academical	3	(1)
- * Club domestic league appearances and goals as of 09:27, 22 November 2026 (UTC)

Alister Crawford (born 30 July 1991) is a Scottish professional footballer who plays as a midfielder for Hamilton Academical.

== Career ==
=== Hamilton Academical ===
Born in Lanark and brought up in nearby Carluke, Crawford played as a child with local club Milton Rovers before joining the youth setup at Heart of Midlothian, but he was released in 2006 due to concerns over his slight build. Picked up by Hamilton Academical, he progressed to the first team and made his league debut aged 18 on 13 January 2010 against Dundee United, and spent a loan spell at Bo'ness United during the first half of the 2010–11 season. In May 2011, he signed a new two-year contract with Hamilton despite the club suffering relegation.

In June 2012, Crawford announced that he was willing to prove his worth at the club following a spell of injury. On 28 August 2012, Crawford scored the only goal of the game as Hamilton beat Partick Thistle 1–0 in extra time in the 2012–13 Scottish League Cup, and he later spoke of his desire to help "kick-start" the season. Crawford signed a new two-year contract in July 2013. At the start of the 2013–14 season, Crawford publicly stated that the new synthetic pitch at New Douglas Park would give Hamilton an advantage over their opponents.

In April 2014 he was selected to the 2013–14 Championship PFA Scotland Team of the Year, alongside teammates Ziggy Gordon and Anthony Andreu. A month later, Crawford was part of the Hamilton team which won promotion back to the Premiership by defeating Hibernian in the play-off final. In October 2014 he signed a new contract with the club, to last until the summer of 2018. In August 2015, he scored a late winning goal against Hearts in the first match he had played against his former youth club.

In September 2016 it was suggested by Hamilton manager Martin Canning that Crawford should play for the Scotland national team. In November 2016 club captain Michael Devlin said that the team hoped that Crawford would not leave the club in the January 2017 transfer window. In December 2016, Canning said they wished to keep Crawford until the end of the 2016–17 season.

Crawford was one of seven first-team players who left Hamilton at the end of the 2017–18 season; he stated that his preference was to play in England.

=== Doncaster Rovers ===
On 10 July 2018, Crawford signed for League One side Doncaster Rovers on a two-year contract.

=== Bolton Wanderers ===
On 2 September 2019, Crawford signed for fellow League One side Bolton Wanderers on a contract until the end of the season, after terminating his contract with Doncaster Rovers. He made his debut on 14 September, starting against Rotherham United in a 6-1 defeat. He scored his first goal for the club in the EFL Trophy game at Rochdale on 1 October, a game Bolton eventually lost on penalties. On 26 June it was announced Crawford would be one of 14 senior players released at the end of his contract on 30 June, but he returned to the club a few days later after signing a new two-year contract, turning down League One teams in order to return.

==== Tranmere Rovers (loan) ====
On 1 February 2021, he signed on loan for Tranmere Rovers until the end of the season.

=== St Johnstone ===
On 31 August 2021, Crawford returned to Scotland to join St Johnstone on a six-month loan deal until January 2022.

On 3 January 2022, Crawford signed a permanent deal with St Johnstone until 2024.

=== Greenock Morton ===
On 24 February 2023, Crawford joined Greenock Morton on a loan until the end of the season.

On 2 August 2024, Crawford joined Morton on a six-month permanent deal with the option to extend following his departure from St Johnstone.

=== Return to Hamilton ===
In November 2026, Crawford re-signed for Hamilton Academical.

== Career statistics ==
As of 28 January 2023

Appearances and goals by club, season and competition
Club	Season	League			National Cup		League Cup		Other		Total	
Club	Season	Division	Apps	Goals	Apps	Goals	Apps	Goals	Apps	Goals	Apps	Goals
Hamilton Academical	2009–10	Scottish Premier League	7	0	0	0	0	0	—		7	0
Hamilton Academical	2010–11	Scottish Premier League	14	0	0	0	0	0	—		14	0
Hamilton Academical	2011–12	Scottish First Division	19	2	2	0	1	0	4 (Note: Appearances in the Scottish Challenge Cup)	1	26	3
Hamilton Academical	2012–13	Scottish First Division	33	3	3	1	3	1	1	0	40	5
Hamilton Academical	2013–14	Scottish Championship	36	2	1	0	3	0	5 (Note: One appearance in the Scottish Challenge Cup and four in the Premiership play-offs)	0	45	2
Hamilton Academical	2014–15	Scottish Premiership	38	10	1	0	4	0	—		43	10
Hamilton Academical	2015–16	Scottish Premiership	33	5	1	0	1	0	—		35	5
Hamilton Academical	2016–17	Scottish Premiership	33	8	2	0	5	2	2 (Note: Appearances in the Premiership play-offs)	0	42	10
Hamilton Academical	2017–18	Scottish Premiership	14	1	0	0	5	2	—		19	3
Hamilton Academical	Total		227	31	10	1	22	5	12	1	271	38
Bo'ness United (loan)	2010–11	East Superleague	Unknown (Note: Bo'ness play in the Junior leagues, where player statistics are not recorded on a consistently reliable basis. Their regional champions qualify for the senior Scottish Cup.)		1	0	—				1	0
Doncaster Rovers	2018–19	EFL League One	35	3	4	0	0	0	3	0	42	3
Doncaster Rovers	2019–20	EFL League One	1	0	0	0	1	0	0	0	2	0
Doncaster Rovers	Total		36	3	4	0	1	0	3	0	44	3
Bolton Wanderers	2019–20	EFL League One	12	0	0	0	0	0	2 (Note: Appearance(s) in the EFL Trophy.)	2	14	2
Bolton Wanderers	2020–21	EFL League Two	21	1	1	0	1	0	1	0	24	1
Bolton Wanderers	2021–22	EFL League One	0	0	0	0	0	0	0	0	0	0
Bolton Wanderers	Total		33	1	1	0	1	0	3	2	38	3
Tranmere Rovers (loan)	2020–21	EFL League Two	9	0	0	0	0	0	0	0	9	0
St Johnstone (loan)	2021–22	Scottish Premiership	14	1	0	0	2	1	0	0	16	2
St Johnstone	2021–22	Scottish Premiership	14	2	1	0	0	0	0	0	15	2
St Johnstone	2022–23	Scottish Premiership	16	2	0	0	2	0	0	0	18	2
St Johnstone	Total		30	4	1	0	2	0	0	0	33	4
Greenock Morton (loan)	2022–23	Scottish Championship	0	0	0	0	0	0	0	0	0	0
Career total			348	40	17	1	27	6	18	3	410	50
