= 2012–13 Livingston F.C. season =

Livingston
2012–13 season
- Manager: John Hughes (until 13 November); Gareth Evans (from 13 November – 28 February); Richie Burke (from 28 February)
- Stadium: Almondvale Stadium
- First Division: 4th
- Challenge Cup: First round
- League Cup: Third round
- Scottish Cup: Fourth round
- Top goalscorer: League: Iain Russell (15); All: Iain Russell (18)
- Highest home attendance: 1,762 vs. Partick Thistle, First Division, 5 January 2013
- Lowest home attendance: 493 vs. Dumbarton, League Cup, 28 August 2012
- Average home league attendance: 1,320
Home colours	Away colours

The 2012–13 season was Livingston's second consecutive season in the First Division, having been promoted after winning the Scottish Second Division during season 2010–11. They also competed in the Challenge Cup, League Cup and the Scottish Cup.

== Summary ==
=== Season ===
During season 2012–13 Livingston finished fourth in the Scottish First Division. They reached the first round of the Challenge Cup, the third round of the League Cup and the fourth round of the Scottish Cup.

=== Management ===
They began the season under the management of John Hughes. On 13 November 2012, Hughes left the club after only nine months in charge to take up the post of first team coach at Hartlepool United. Gareth Evans took over as interim manager following Hughes departure. At the end of November it was confirmed Evans would remain as manager on an ongoing basis.

On 28 February 2013, Evans was sacked by the club with Director of football John Collins resigning from his post. Richie Burke the club's youth development manager took charge of the first team in the interim. On 25 March, Burke was appointed as manager permanently with Mark Burchill joining the club as his assistant. The duo were given contracts until 2015, with Burchill also being registered as a player.

== Results and fixtures ==
Win Draw Loss Postponed

=== Preseason ===
A match against Rapid Bucharest, scheduled for 7 July, was called off due to a waterlogged pitch.

4 July 2012 Friendly	Livingston	0–2	Concordia Chiajna	Grangemouth Stadium
14:00		Livingston Report; Concordia Report	Leca 6'; Stan 14'	Attendance: 300

10 July 2012 Friendly (Closed Door)	Stirling Albion	0–2	Livingston	Forthbank Stadium
19:30		Livingston Report	McNulty 41', 57'	Referee: Cook

14 July 2012 Friendly	Livingston	3–2	Kilmarnock	Grangemouth Stadium
15:00	Andreu 52'; Barr 67'; McNulty 73'	Livingston Report; Daily Record Report	Harkins 16'; McKenzie 41'

18 July 2012 Friendly (Closed Door)	Livingston	3–1	Brechin City	Ainslie Park
	McNulty; Barr	Livingston Report	McKenna

21 July 2012 Friendly	Berwick Rangers	2–1	Livingston	Shielfield Park
14:00	Currie	Report	McNulty

=== Scottish First Division ===
11 August 2012	Greenock Morton	2–2	Livingston	Cappielow Park
15:00	Weatherson 7'; Wallace 80'	SFL Report	Russell 25'; Scougall 39'	Attendance: 1,898; Referee: Charleston

18 August 2012	Livingston	0–2	Airdrie United	Braidwood Motor Company Stadium
15:00		SFL Report	Boyle 48'; Bain 70'	Attendance: 1,170; Referee: Tumilty

25 August 2012	Raith Rovers	0–0	Livingston	Stark's Park
15:00		SFL Report		Attendance: 1,774; Referee: Colvin

2 September 2012	Falkirk	1–2	Livingston	Falkirk Stadium
15:00	Murdoch 34' (pen.); Dods (yellow card) 88' (red card)	SFL Report	Fordyce 39'; Watson (red card) 49'; Andreu 90'	Attendance: 2,974; Referee: Norris

15 September 2012	Livingston	1–2	Partick Thistle	Braidwood Motor Company Stadium
15:00	Morton 59'	SFL Report	Lawless 38', 48'	Attendance: 1,745; Referee: Thomson

22 September 2012	Dunfermline Athletic	4–0	Livingston	East End Park
15:00	Barrowman 26', 65'; McMillan 30'; Thomson 61'	SFL Report		Attendance: 2,958; Referee: Somers

29 September 2012	Livingston	5–0	Dumbarton	Braidwood Motor Company Stadium
15:00	McNulty 9', 36'; Barr 12'; Booth 65'; Ke. Jacobs 77'	SFL Report		Attendance: 1,021; Referee: Salmond

6 October 2012	Livingston	1–1	Cowdenbeath	Braidwood Motor Company Stadium
15:00	Ke. Jacobs 71'	SFL Report	Armstrong (red card) 55'; Milne 90'	Attendance: 1,203; Referee: Allan

20 October 2012	Hamilton Academical	1–2	Livingston	New Douglas Park
15:00	May 1'; Neil (red card) 68'	SFL Report	Scougall 3'; McNulty 9'; McCann (yellow card) 74' (red card)	Attendance: 943; Referee: Salmond

27 October 2012	Livingston	2–2	Greenock Morton	Braidwood Motor Company Stadium
15:00	Russell 8', 79' (pen.)	SFL Report	Campbell 50', 55'	Attendance: 1,417; Referee: Tumilty

9 November 2012	Airdrie United	1–3	Livingston	Excelsior Stadium
19:45	Di Giacomo 20'	SFL Report	McNulty 25'; Fox 63'; Russell 87' (pen.)	Attendance: 1,003; Referee: McLean

17 November 2012	Livingston	2–1	Falkirk	Braidwood Motor Company Stadium
15:00	McNulty 23'; Jacobs 65'	SFL Report	McGrandles 84'	Attendance: 1,471; Referee: Charleston

24 November 2012	Partick Thistle	2–0	Livingston	Firhill Stadium
15:00	Sinclair 54'; Bannigan 63'	SFL Report		Attendance: 2,508; Referee: McKendrick

8 December 2012	Livingston	2–1	Dunfermline Athletic	Braidwood Motor Company Stadium
15:00	García Tena 65'; Mullen 90'; Barr (yellow card) 90+3' (red card)	SFL Report	Morris (red card) 19'; Barrowman 90+4' (pen.)	Attendance: 1,495; Referee: Beaton

15 December 2012	Dumbarton	P–P	Livingston	Dumbarton Football Stadium
15:00		BBC Report

22 December 2012	Cowdenbeath	1–1	Livingston	Central Park
15:00	McKenzie 1'	SFL Report	Scougall 70'	Attendance: 409; Referee: Collum

29 December 2012	Livingston	P–P	Hamilton Academical	Braidwood Motor Company Stadium
15:00		SFL Report
Note: Postponed due to waterlogged pitch

2 January 2013	Falkirk	P–P	Livingston	Falkirk Stadium
15:00		BBC Report
Note: Postponed due to waterlogged pitch

5 January 2013	Livingston	2–2	Partick Thistle	Braidwood Motor Company Stadium
15:00	Andreu 29'; McNulty 90+2'	SFL Report	Doolan 25'; Craig 32'; Welsh (red card) 89'	Attendance: 1,762; Referee: Salmond

12 January 2013	Livingston	2–1	Raith Rovers	Braidwood Motor Company Stadium
15:00	Russell 29'; Barr 49'	SFL Report	Graham 34'	Attendance: 1,424; Referee: Madden

19 January 2013	Greenock Morton	2–1	Livingston	Cappielow Park
15:00	Hardie 15'; MacDonald 68'	SFL Report	Russell 53'	Attendance: 1,913; Referee: Finnie

26 January 2013	Dunfermline Athletic	0–1	Livingston	East End Park
15:00		SFL Report	Andreu 21'	Attendance: 2,461; Referee: Tumilty

2 February 2013	Dumbarton	3–4	Livingston	Dumbarton Football Stadium
15:00	Gilhaney 71'; Lithgow 90'; Prunty 90+4'	BBC Report	Russell 43', 82'; Scougall 47'; Morton 86'	Attendance: 744; Referee: McKendrick

9 February 2013	Livingston	2–3	Dumbarton	Braidwood Motor Company Stadium
15:00	Morton 22'; Russell 45+2' (pen.)	SFL Report	Prunty 4'; Graham 23'; Agnew 69' (pen.); Gilhaney (red card) 79'	Attendance: 1,170; Referee: Robertson

16 February 2013	Livingston	3–0	Cowdenbeath	Braidwood Motor Company Stadium
15:00	Russell 27'; Andreu 39'; Garcia Tena 44'	SFL Report		Attendance: 1,112; Referee: Muir

19 February 2013	Falkirk	2–0	Livingston	Falkirk Stadium
19:45	Taylor 39', 63'	SFL Report		Attendance: 2,583; Referee: Brines

23 February 2013	Hamilton Academical	1–1	Livingston	New Douglas Park
15:00	May 90+1'	SFL Report	Russell 77'	Attendance: 914; Referee: Northcroft

2 March 2013	Livingston	4–1	Airdrie United	Braidwood Motor Company Stadium
15:00	Andreu 21', 39'; Russell 44'; Scougall 77'	SFL Report	Lynch (yellow card) 75' (yellow-red card); Boyle 90+1'	Attendance: 1,132; Referee: Finnie

9 March 2013	Raith Rovers	0–2	Livingston	Stark's Park
15:00		SFL Report	Russell 20' (pen.); Scougall 35'	Attendance: 1,117; Referee: Somers

16 March 2013	Livingston	P–P	Falkirk	Braidwood Motor Company Stadium
15:00		BBC Report
Note: Postponed due to snow on pitch

19 March 2013	Livingston	P–P	Hamilton Academical	Braidwood Motor Company Stadium
19:45		BBC Report
Note: Postponed due to snow on pitch

23 March 2013	Partick Thistle	6–1	Livingston	Firhill Stadium
15:00	Muirhead 19' (pen.); Craig 22'; Craigen 36'; Lawless 43'; Erskine 57'; Doolan 69'	SFL Report	Watson 45'	Attendance: 2,897; Referee: Salmond

27 March 2013	Livingston	P–P	Hamilton Academical	Braidwood Motor Company Stadium
19:45		SFL Report
Note: Postponed due to snow

30 March 2013	Livingston	2–2	Dunfermline Athletic	Almondvale Stadium
15:00	Andreu 54'; McNulty 68'	SFL Report	Thomson 22'; Husband 90' (pen.)	Attendance: 1,465; Referee: Robertson

2 April 2013	Livingston	1–2	Falkirk	Almondvale Stadium
19:45	Russell 26' (pen.); Russell (yellow card) 82' (yellow-red card)	SFL Report	Higgins 62'; Talbot 73' (Own goal)	Attendance: 1,100; Referee: Colvin

6 April 2013	Dumbarton	0–3	Livingston	Dumbarton Football Stadium
15:00		SFL Report	Lander 32'; Watson 46'; Mullen 77'	Attendance: 705; Referee: Collum

9 April 2013	Cowdenbeath	2–2	Livingston	Central Park
19:45	Stewart 35'; McKenzie 90'	SFL Report	Watson 7'; Barr 71'	Attendance: 455; Referee: Allan

13 April 2013	Livingston	0–3	Hamilton Academical	Braidwood Motor Company Stadium
15:00		Report	May 41' (pen.), 43', 84'; Page (yellow card) 80' (yellow-red card)	Attendance: 1,607; Referee: Somers

16 April 2013	Livingston	0–0	Hamilton Academical	Braidwood Motor Company Stadium
19:45	Docherty (red card) 27'	SFL Report		Attendance: 787; Referee: McLean

20 April 2013	Livingston	0–2	Greenock Morton	Braidwood Motor Company Stadium
15:00		Report	Campbell 43'; Wilkie 55'	Attendance: 1,158; Referee: Charleston

27 April 2013	Airdrie United	0–2	Livingston	Excelsior Stadium
15:00		SFL Report	Barr 26'; Garcia Tena 80'	Attendance: 650; Referee: Madden

4 May 2013	Livingston	2–3	Raith Rovers	Almondvale Stadium
15:00	Fox 45' (pen.); Russell 90'	SFL Report	G.Anderson 21'; Graham 82', 90'	Attendance: 1,302; Referee: Roache

=== Scottish Challenge Cup ===
28 July 2012 First round	Annan Athletic	1–0	Livingston	Galabank
15:00	Bell 74'	SFL Report		Attendance: 572; Referee: Robertson

=== Scottish League Cup ===
4 August 2012 First round	Stranraer	0–8	Livingston	Stair Park
15:00		SFL Report	Morton 17', 87'; McNulty 23', 66', 83'; Russell 39', 80'; McCann 62'	Attendance: 284; Referee: Hilland

28 August 2012 Second round	Livingston	3–2 (a.e.t.)	Dumbarton	Braidwood Motor Company Stadium
19:45	Russell 39' (pen.); Barr 96'; Easton 102'	SFL Report	Lister 36'; Gilhaney 110'	Attendance: 493; Referee: Allan

25 September 2012 Third round	Heart of Midlothian	3–1	Livingston	Tynecastle Stadium
19:45	Grainger 45'; Žaliūkas 70', 74'	BBC Report; SFL Report	McNulty 56'	Attendance: 6,322; Referee: McLean

=== Scottish Cup ===
1 December 2012 Fourth round	Livingston	0–2	Dundee	Braidwood Motor Company Stadium
15:00		BBC Report	Milne 9'; Conroy 17' (pen.)	Attendance: 1,432; Referee: Allan

== Player statistics ==
=== Captains ===
No.	P	Name	Country	No. games	Notes
	MF	Fox	(Scotland)	28	Club captain

Last updated: 6 May 2013
Source: Competitive match reports.
Competitive matches only
Matches started as captain only
Country: FIFA nationality; No.: Squad number; P: Position; Name: Player name; No. Games: Number of games started as captain.

=== Squad ===
Last updated 6 May 2013

No.	Pos	Nat	Player	Total		First Division		Challenge Cup		League Cup		Scottish Cup	
No.	Pos	Nat	Player	Apps	Goals	Apps	Goals	Apps	Goals	Apps	Goals	Apps	Goals
	GK	(Scotland) SCO	Darren Jamieson	3	0	3+0	0	0+0	0	0+0	0	0+0	0
	GK	(Scotland) SCO	Andrew McNeil	38	0	33+0	0	1+0	0	3+0	0	1+0	0
	DF	(Scotland) SCO	Craig Barr	35	4	32+0	4	0+0	0	2+0	0	1−+0	0
	DF	(Scotland) SCO	Callum Booth	31	1	22+8	1	0+0	0	0+0	0	1+0	0
	DF	(Scotland) SCO	Ross Docherty	13	0	9+1	0	0+0	0	3+0	0	0+0	0
	DF	(Scotland) SCO	Callum Fordyce	16	1	8+4	1	1+0	0	2+1	0	0+0	0
	DF	(Scotland) SCO	Kevin McCann	31	1	28+1	0	1+0	0	1+0	1	0+0	0
	DF	(England) ENG	Jason Talbot	12	0	8+4	0	0+0	0	0+0	0	0+0	0
	DF	(Spain) ESP	Jesús García Tena	31	3	29+0	3	0+0	0	1+0	0	1+0	0
	DF	(Scotland) SCO	Paul Watson	21	3	17+1	3	1+0	0	2+0	0	0+0	0
	MF	(France) FRA	Anthony Andreu	38	7	33+0	7	1+0	0	3+0	0	1+0	0
	MF	(Scotland) SCO	Bobby Barr	8	1	4+1	0	1+0	0	1+1	1	0+0	0
	MF	(Scotland) SCO	Jack Beaumont	2	0	0+0	0	0+1	0	0+1	0	0+0	0
	MF	(Scotland) SCO	Dean Cummings	1	0	0+0	0	0+0	0	1+0	0	0+0	0
	MF	(Scotland) SCO	Coll Donaldson	5	0	3+2	0	0+0	0	0+0	0	0+0	0
	MF	(Scotland) SCO	Jack Downie	5	0	0+3	0	0+1	0	0+1	0	0+0	0
	MF	(Scotland) SCO	Liam Fox	28	2	27+0	2	0+0	0	0+0	0	1+0	0
	MF	(Scotland) SCO	Ross Gray	7	0	0+5	0	0+0	0	0+2	0	0+0	0
	MF	(South Africa) RSA	Keaghan Jacobs	14	3	10+1	3	1+0	0	1+0	0	1+0	0
	MF	(South Africa) RSA	Kyle Jacobs	19	0	14+4	0	0+0	0	0+0	0	1+0	0
	MF	(Scotland) SCO	Connor McDonald	8	0	1+4	0	1+0	0	1+1	0	0+0	0
	MF	(Scotland) SCO	Burton O'Brien	24	0	23+0	0	0+0	0	0+0	0	1+0	0
	MF	(Scotland) SCO	Stefan Scougall	33	6	27+1	6	1+0	0	3+0	0	1+0	0
	FW	(Scotland) SCO	Mark Burchill	0	0	0+0	0	0+0	0	0+0	0	0+0	0
	FW	(Scotland) SCO	Dylan Easton	6	1	0+4	0	0+0	0	0+2	1	0+0	0
	FW	(Scotland) SCO	Kyle Lander	6	1	4+2	1	0+0	0	0+0	0	0+0	0
	FW	(France) FRA	David Luongo	0	0	0+0	0	0+0	0	0+0	0	0+0	0
	FW	(Scotland) SCO	Marc McNulty	31	11	20+6	7	1+0	0	3+0	4	1+0	0
	FW	(Scotland) SCO	Jordan Morton	29	5	11+13	3	1+0	0	3+0	2	0+1	0
	FW	(Scotland) SCO	Danny Mullen	24	2	2+21	2	0+0	0	0+0	0	0+1	0
	FW	(Scotland) SCO	Iain Russell	37	18	28+5	15	0+1	0	3+0	3	0+0	0
	FW	(Scotland) SCO	Andrew Russell	0	0	0+0	0	0+0	0	0+0	0	0+0	0

=== Disciplinary record ===
Includes all competitive matches.

Last updated 6 May 2013

Nation	Position	Name	First Division		Challenge Cup		League Cup		Scottish Cup		Total	
Nation	Position	Name	Booked	Sent off (straight red)	Booked	Sent off (straight red)	Booked	Sent off (straight red)	Booked	Sent off (straight red)	Booked	Sent off (straight red)
(Scotland)	GK	Darren Jamieson	0	0	0	0	0	0	0	0	0	0
(Scotland)	GK	Andrew McNeil	0	0	0	0	0	0	0	0	0	0
(Scotland)	DF	Craig Barr	6	1	0	0	2	0	0	0	8	1
(Scotland)	DF	Callum Booth	3	0	0	0	0	0	0	0	3	0
(Scotland)	DF	Ross Docherty	1	1	0	0	1	0	0	0	2	1
(Scotland)	DF	Callum Fordyce	1	0	0	0	0	0	0	0	1	0
(Scotland)	DF	Kevin McCann	6	1	0	0	0	0	0	0	6	1
(England)	DF	Jason Talbot	2	0	0	0	0	0	0	0	2	0
(Spain)	DF	Jesús García Tena	8	0	0	0	1	0	0	0	9	0
(Scotland)	DF	Paul Watson	1	1	0	0	0	0	0	0	1	1
(France)	MF	Anthony Andreu	1	0	0	0	0	0	0	0	1	0
(Scotland)	MF	Bobby Barr	0	0	0	0	0	0	0	0	0	0
(Scotland)	MF	Jack Beaumont	0	0	0	0	0	0	0	0	0	0
(Scotland)	MF	Dean Cummings	0	0	0	0	0	0	0	0	0	0
(Scotland)	MF	Coll Donaldson	0	0	0	0	0	0	0	0	0	0
(Scotland)	MF	Jack Downie	0	0	0	0	0	0	0	0	0	0
(Scotland)	MF	Liam Fox	3	0	0	0	0	0	0	0	3	0
(Scotland)	MF	Ross Gray	0	0	0	0	0	0	0	0	0	0
(South Africa)	MF	Keaghan Jacobs	1	0	0	0	0	0	0	0	1	0
(South Africa)	MF	Kyle Jacobs	2	0	0	0	0	0	0	0	2	0
(Scotland)	MF	Connor McDonald	1	0	0	0	0	0	0	0	1	0
(Scotland)	MF	Burton O'Brien	2	0	0	0	0	0	0	0	2	0
(Scotland)	MF	Stefan Scougall	4	0	0	0	0	0	0	0	4	0
(Scotland)	FW	Mark Burchill	0	0	0	0	0	0	0	0	0	0
(Scotland)	FW	Dylan Easton	0	0	0	0	0	0	0	0	0	0
(Scotland)	FW	Kyle Lander	0	0	0	0	0	0	0	0	0	0
(France)	FW	David Luongo	0	0	0	0	0	0	0	0	0	0
(Scotland)	FW	Marc McNulty	0	0	0	0	1	0	0	0	1	0
(Scotland)	FW	Jordan Morton	1	0	1	0	1	0	0	0	3	0
(Scotland)	FW	Danny Mullen	0	0	0	0	0	0	0	0	0	0
(Scotland)	FW	Iain Russell	7	1	0	0	1	0	0	0	8	1
(Scotland)	FW	Andrew Russell	0	0	0	0	0	0	0	0	0	0

== Team statistics ==
=== League table ===
Pos	Team	Pld	W	D	L	GF	GA	GD	Pts
2	Greenock Morton	36	20	7	9	73	47	+26	67
3	Falkirk	36	15	8	13	52	48	+4	53
4	Livingston	36	14	10	12	58	56	+2	52
5	Hamilton Academical	36	14	9	13	52	45	+7	51
6	Raith Rovers	36	11	13	12	45	48	−3	46

Source: SPFL Archive
Rules for classification: 1) points; 2) goal difference; 3) number of goals scored.

=== Division summary ===
Round	1	2	3	4	5	6	7	8	9	10	11	12	13	14	15	16	17	18	19	20	21	22	23	24	25	26	27	28	29	30	31	32	33	34	35	36
Ground	A	H	A	A	H	A	H	H	A	H	A	H	A	H	A	H	H	A	A	A	H	H	A	A	H	A	A	H	H	A	H	H	H	H	A	H
Result	D	L	D	W	L	L	W	D	W	D	W	W	L	W	D	D	W	L	W	W	L	W	L	D	W	W	L	D	L	W	D	L	D	L	W	L
Position	5	7	8	7	7	8	6	6	6	5	5	4	5	4	4	6	4	4	4	4	4	4	4	4	3	3	3	3	4	4	4 (Note: Dunfermline were deducted 15 points shortly prior to this fixture altering league standings. This was as a result of them entering administration.)	4	3	3	3	4

Updated to match(es) played on 6 May 2013. Source: Statto.com
A = Away; H = Home; W = Win; D = Draw; L = Loss

== Transfers ==
=== Players in ===
Player	From	Fee
(Scotland) Jordan Morton	(Scotland) Heart of Midlothian	Free
(France) David Luongo	(Switzerland) Stade Nyonnais	Free
(France) Tony Andreu	(Switzerland) Stade Nyonnais	Free
(Spain) Jesús García Tena	(Italy) AC Cuneo 1905	Free
(Scotland) Callum Booth	(Scotland) Hibernian	Loan
(Scotland) Burton O'Brien	Free agent	Free

=== Players out ===
Player	To	Fee
(Scotland) David Aitken	Free agent	Free
(Scotland) Andrew Murphy	(Scotland) Bathgate Thistle	Free
(Scotland) David Sinclair	(Scotland) Ayr United	Free
(Scotland) Bryce Naples	Free agent	Free
(South Africa) Michael Travis	(Scotland) Arbroath	Free
(Scotland) Jonathan Brown	(Scotland) Brechin City	Free
(Scotland) Kenny Deuchar	Free agent	Free
(Scotland) Michael Scott	Free agent	Free
(England) Rory Boulding	(Scotland) Kilmarnock	Free
(Scotland) Bobby Barr	(Scotland) East Fife	Loan
(Scotland) Andrew Russell	(Scotland) Bathgate Thistle	Loan
(Scotland) Ross Brady	(England) Berwick Rangers	Free
(Scotland) Ross Gray	(England) Berwick Rangers	Loan
(Scotland) Bobby Barr	(Scotland) East Fife	Free
(Scotland) Dylan Easton	(England) Berwick Rangers	Free
(Scotland) Dean Cummings	Free agent	Free
(Scotland) Callum Fordyce	(Scotland) Clyde	Loan
