= 2013–14 Hamilton Academical F.C. season =

Hamilton Academical
2013–14 season
- Chairman: Les Gray
- Manager: Alex Neil
- Stadium: New Douglas Park
- Championship: Second place (Promoted via play-offs)
- Challenge Cup: First Round
- League Cup: Third Round
- Scottish Cup: Third Round
- Top goalscorer: League: Keatings & Andreu (13); All: Keatings & Andreau (15)
- Highest home attendance: 4,529 v Dundee, Championship, 5 April 2014
- Lowest home attendance: 817 v Cowdenbeath, Championship, 21 September 2013
- Average home league attendance: 1,476
Home colours	Away colours

The 2013–14 season was Hamilton Academical's first season in the newly formed Scottish Championship and their third consecutive season in the second tier of Scottish football. Hamilton also competed in the League Cup, Scottish Cup and the Challenge Cup.

== Summary ==
=== Season ===
Hamilton finished second in the Scottish Championship with 67 points. They were promoted to the Scottish Premiership in May 2014 after defeating Hibernian in the premiership play-offs. Hamilton also reached the third rounds of the Scottish Cup and League Cup and the first round of the Challenge Cup.

== Results and fixtures ==
Win Draw Loss Postponed

=== Scottish Championship ===
10 August 2013 1	Raith Rovers	0–1	Hamilton Academical	Stark's Park
15:00		BBC	Keatings 68'	Attendance: 1,652; Referee: Crawford Allan

17 August 2013 2	Hamilton Academical	4–1	Dumbarton	New Douglas Park
15:00	Keatings 28' (pen.) 30'; Gillespie 72'; Andreu 77'	BBC	Agnew 67' (pen.)	Attendance: 995; Referee: Kevin Clancy

24 August 2013 3	Hamilton Academical	2–0	Queen of the South	New Douglas Park
15:00	MacKinnon 39'; Ryan 80'	BBC		Attendance: 1,367; Referee: Steven McLean

31 August 2013 4	Falkirk	1–2	Hamilton Academical	Falkirk Stadium
15:00	Fulton 50'	BBC	Antoine-Curier 72'; Crawford 75'	Attendance: 3,266; Referee: Bobby Madden

14 September 2013 5	Dundee	0–0	Hamilton Academical	Dens Park
15:00		BBC		Attendance: 4,155; Referee: Mat Northcroft

21 September 2013 6	Hamilton Academical	1–0	Cowdenbeath	New Douglas Park
15:00	Gordon 51'	BBC		Attendance: 817; Referee: Euan Anderson

28 September 2013 7	Alloa Athletic	1–0	Hamilton Academical	Recreation Park
15:00	McCord 45' (pen.)	BBC	Neil (red card) 44'	Attendance: 653; Referee: Stevie O'Reilly

5 October 2013 8	Hamilton Academical	2–0	Livingston	New Douglas Park
15:00	Keatings 33' (pen.) , 65'	BBC		Attendance: 1,059; Referee: Des Roache

12 October 2013 9	Greenock Morton	1–1	Hamilton Academical	Cappielow
15:00	Habai 69'	BBC	Andreu 33'	Attendance: 2,106; Referee: Calum Murray

19 October 2013 10	Hamilton Academical	1–1	Raith Rovers	New Douglas Park
15:00	Keatings 31'	BBC	Hill (red card) 34'; Elliot 70' (pen.)	Attendance: 1,113; Referee: Iain Brines

26 October 2013 11	Hamilton Academical	2–0	Falkirk	New Douglas Park
15:00	Andreu 21'; Longridge 89'	BBC		Attendance: 1,340; Referee: Alan Muir

9 November 2013 12	Queen of the South	0–1	Hamilton Academical	Palmerston Park
15:00		BBC	Antoine-Curier 16'	Attendance: 1,557; Referee: George Salmond

16 November 2013 13	Cowdenbeath	2–4	Hamilton Academical	Central Park, Cowdenbeath
15:00	Wedderburn 18'; Milne 37'	BBC	García Tena 66'; MacKinnon 69'; Gordon 71'; Andreu 90'	Attendance: 401; Referee: Des Roache

23 November 2013 14	Hamilton Academical	0–3	Dundee	New Douglas Park
15:00		BBC	Davidson 16'; Gallagher 57'; MacDonald 89'	Attendance: 2,077; Referee: Bobby Madden

7 December 2013 15	Hamilton Academical	0–1	Alloa Athletic	New Douglas Park
15:00		BBC	Meggatt 47'	Attendance: 860; Referee: Greg Aitken

14 December 2013 16	Livingston	0–0	Hamilton Academical	Almondvale Stadium
15:00		BBC		Attendance: 794; Referee: Mat Northcroft

21 December 2013 17	Dumbarton	2–1	Hamilton Academical	Dumbarton Football Stadium
15:00	Fleming 11'; Graham 71'	BBC	Keatings 33'	Attendance: 642; Referee: John McKendrick

28 December 2013 18	Hamilton Academical	1–0	Greenock Morton	New Douglas Park
15:00	Antoine-Curier 24'	BBC		Attendance: 1,472; Referee: Iain Brines

4 January 2014 19	Hamilton Academical	3–1	Queen of the South	New Douglas Park
15:00	Longridge 4'; Antoine-Curier 9'; Crawford 58'	BBC	Russell 22'	Attendance: 1,366; Referee: Calum Murray

11 January 2014 20	Falkirk	0–0	Hamilton Academical	Falkirk Stadium
15:00		BBC		Attendance: 3,099; Referee: Crawford Allan

25 January 2014 21	Hamilton Academical	3–4	Cowdenbeath	New Douglas Park
15:00	Andreu 66', 86'; Keatings 81' (pen.)	BBC	Stewart 5', 46'; Hemmings 9', 20'	Attendance: 944; Referee: Euan Anderson

1 February 2014 22	Hamilton Academical	3–3	Dumbarton	New Douglas Park
15:00	Keatings 4', 71'; Scotland 88'	BBC	Kirkpatrick 27'; Hendrie 69' (o.g.); Kane 89'	Attendance: 1,061; Referee: Des Roache

8 February 2014 23	Dundee	1–0	Hamilton Academical	Dens Park
15:00	Boyle 6'	BBC	Hendrie (red card) 51'; Gordon (red card) 62'	Attendance: 5,206; Referee: Stephen Finnie

15 February 2014 24	Raith Rovers	2–4	Hamilton Academical	Stark's Park
15:00	Cardle 82'; Baird 89'	BBC	Andreu 4', 32'; Longridge 39'; Keatings 43' (pen.)	Attendance: 1,436; Referee: Willie Collum

21 February 2014 25	Hamilton Academical	2–0	Livingston	New Douglas Park
19:45	Scotland 28'; Antoine-Curier 90'	BBC		Attendance: 1,063; Referee: Craig Charleston

1 March 2014 26	Alloa Athletic	0–3	Hamilton Academical	Recreation Park
15:00		BBC	Longridge 1'; Keatings 11' (pen.); Andreu 20'	Attendance: 656; Referee: Stephen Finnie

8 March 2014 27	Queen of the South	1–1	Hamilton Academical	Palmerston Park
15:00	Reilly 63'	BBC	Canning 56'	Attendance: 995; Referee: John McKendrick

15 March 2014 28	Hamilton Academical	3–1	Falkirk	New Douglas Park
15:00	Scotland 4'; MacKinnon 74'; Longridge 90'	BBC	Beck 71'	Attendance: 1,706; Referee: Alan Muir

22 March 2014 29	Greenock Morton	3–4	Hamilton Academical	Cappielow
15:00	Vine 23'; Fitzpatrick 60'; O'Connor 84'	BBC	Scotland 13'; Longridge 54', 64'; Antoine-Curier 87'	Attendance: 1,345; Referee: Calum Murray

25 March 2014 30	Hamilton Academical	3–2	Raith Rovers	New Douglas Park
19:45	Andreu 65'; Keatings 68'; Scotland 90'	BBC	Baird 45', 69'	Attendance: 954; Referee: George Salmond

29 March 2014 31	Cowdenbeath	1–1	Hamilton Academical	Central Park
15:00	O'Brien 90+5'	BBC	Antoine-Curier 90+1'	Attendance: 497; Referee: Kevin Clancy

5 April 2014 32	Hamilton Academical	1–1	Dundee	New Douglas Park
15:00	Antoine-Curier 71'	BBC	Boyle 37'	Attendance: 4,529; Referee: Willie Collum

12 April 2014 33	Livingston	1–1	Hamilton Academical	Almondvale Stadium
15:00	Jacobs 64'	BBC	Hendrie (red card) 54'; Scotland 86'	Attendance: 1,133; Referee: Stephen Finnie

19 April 2014 34	Hamilton Academical	2–1	Alloa Athletic	New Douglas Park
15:00	Scotland 4'; Ryan 46'	BBC	Caldwell 83'	Attendance: 1,087; Referee: Iain Brines

26 April 2014 35	Dumbarton	4–1	Hamilton Academical	Dumbarton Football Stadium
15:00	Agnew 32'; Nish 77'; Megginson 85'; Kirkpatrick 87'	BBC	Scotland 41'; Neil (red card) 83'	Attendance: 1,420; Referee: George Salmond

3 May 2014 36	Hamilton Academical	10–2	Greenock Morton	New Douglas Park
15:00	Antoine-Curier 5', 56', 78', 86'; Andreu 8', 32', 45' (pen.); Longridge 35'; Devlin 68'; Findlay 85' (o.g.)	BBC	Imrie 22', 73'	Attendance: 2,034; Referee: Steven McLean

=== Premiership play-off ===
13 May 2014 Semi–final 1st Leg	Falkirk	1–1	Hamilton Academical	Falkirk Stadium
19:45	Beck 80'	Report	MacKinnon 61'	Attendance: 4,194; Referee: John Beaton

18 May 2014 Semi–final 2nd Leg	Hamilton Academical	1–0 (2–1 agg.)	Falkirk	New Douglas Park
19:45	Andreu 16'	Report		Attendance: 4,678; Referee: Kevin Clancy

21 May 2014 Final 1st Leg	Hamilton Academical	0–2	Hibernian	New Douglas Park
19:45		Report	Cummings 39' 55'	Attendance: 5,322; Referee: Bobby Madden

25 May 2014 Final 2nd Leg	Hibernian	0–2 (a.e.t.) (2–2 agg.) (3–4 p)	Hamilton Academical	Easter Road
15:30		Report	Scotland 13'; Andreu 90+3'	Attendance: 18,031; Referee: Willie Collum
	Penalties
	Thomson (penalty missed); McGivern (penalty scored); Craig (penalty scored); Tudur Jones (penalty scored); Cummings (penalty missed)		(penalty scored) Gillespie; (penalty scored) Andreu; (penalty scored) Antoine-Curier; (penalty scored) Scotland

=== Scottish Challenge Cup ===
27 July 2013 First Round	Airdrieonians	2–1	Hamilton Academical	Excelsior Stadium
15:00	McLaren 24'; Nathan Blockley 59'	BBC	Longridge 18'	Attendance: 807; Referee: Calum Murray

=== Scottish League Cup ===
3 August 2013 First Round	Stirling Albion	0–3	Hamilton Academical	Forthbank Stadium
15:00		BBC	Keatings 32', 64'; Smith 41' (o.g.)	Attendance: 556; Referee: John McKendrick

27 August 2013 Second Round	Kilmarnock	0–1	Hamilton Academical	Rugby Park
19:45		BBC	Antoine-Curier 42'	Attendance: 2,033; Referee: Calum Murray

24 September 2013 Third Round	Hamilton Academical	0–3	St Johnstone	New Douglas Park
19:45		BBC	May 4', 90'; Edwards 86'	Attendance: 1,059; Referee: John Beaton

=== Scottish Cup ===
2 November 2013 Third Round	Queen of the South	1–0	Hamilton Academical	Palmerston Park
15:00	Lyle 64'	BBC		Attendance: 1,324; Referee: Stephen Finnie

== League table ==
Pos	Team	Pld	W	D	L	GF	GA	GD	Pts	Promotion, qualification or relegation
1	Dundee (C, P)	36	21	6	9	54	26	+28	69	Promotion to the Premiership
2	Hamilton Academical (O, P)	36	19	10	7	68	41	+27	67	Qualification for the Premiership play-off semi-final
3	Falkirk	36	19	9	8	59	33	+26	66	Qualification for the Premiership play-off quarter-final
4	Queen of the South	36	16	7	13	53	39	+14	55	Qualification for the Premiership play-off quarter-final
5	Dumbarton	36	15	6	15	65	64	+1	51	

Source: Soccerway
Rules for classification: 1) points; 2) goal difference; 3) number of goals scored.
(C) Champions; (O) Play-off winners; (P) Promoted

=== Division summary ===
Round	1	2	3	4	5	6	7	8	9	10	11	12	13	14	15	16	17	18	19	20	21	22	23	24	25	26	27	28	29	30	31	32	33	34	35	36
Ground	A	H	H	A	A	H	A	H	A	H	H	A	A	H	H	A	A	H	H	A	H	H	A	A	H	A	A	H	A	H	A	H	A	H	A	H
Result	W	W	W	W	D	W	L	W	D	D	W	W	W	L	L	D	L	W	W	D	L	D	L	W	W	W	D	W	W	W	D	D	D	W	L	W
Position	4	1	1	1	1	1	1	1	1	1	1	1	1	1	2	1	2	2	2	2	2	3	3	2	2	2	2	2	2	2	1	1	2	1	2	2

A = Away; H = Home; W = Win; D = Draw; L = Loss

== Transfers ==
=== Players in ===
Player	From	Fee
(Scotland) Blair Currie	(Scotland) Rangers	Free
(Scotland) James Keatings	(Scotland) Celtic	Free
(France) Tony Andreu	(Scotland) Livingston	Free
(France) Mickaël Antoine-Curier	Free Agent	Free
(Spain) Jesús García Tena	(Scotland) Livingston	Free
(Northern Ireland) Paul George	(Scotland) Celtic	Loan
(Trinidad and Tobago) Jason Scotland	(England) Barnsley	Free

=== Players out ===
Player	To	Fee
(England) Jonathan Page	(Scotland) Greenock Morton	Free
(Scotland) Gary Fraser	(England) Bolton Wanderers	Free
(Scotland) Scott Christie	(Scotland) Linlithgow Rose	Undisclosed
(Scotland) Andy Ryan	(Scotland) Brechin City	Loan
(Scotland) Eamonn Brophy	(Scotland) Queen's Park	Loan
