= Carlton Morris =

English footballer (born 1995)

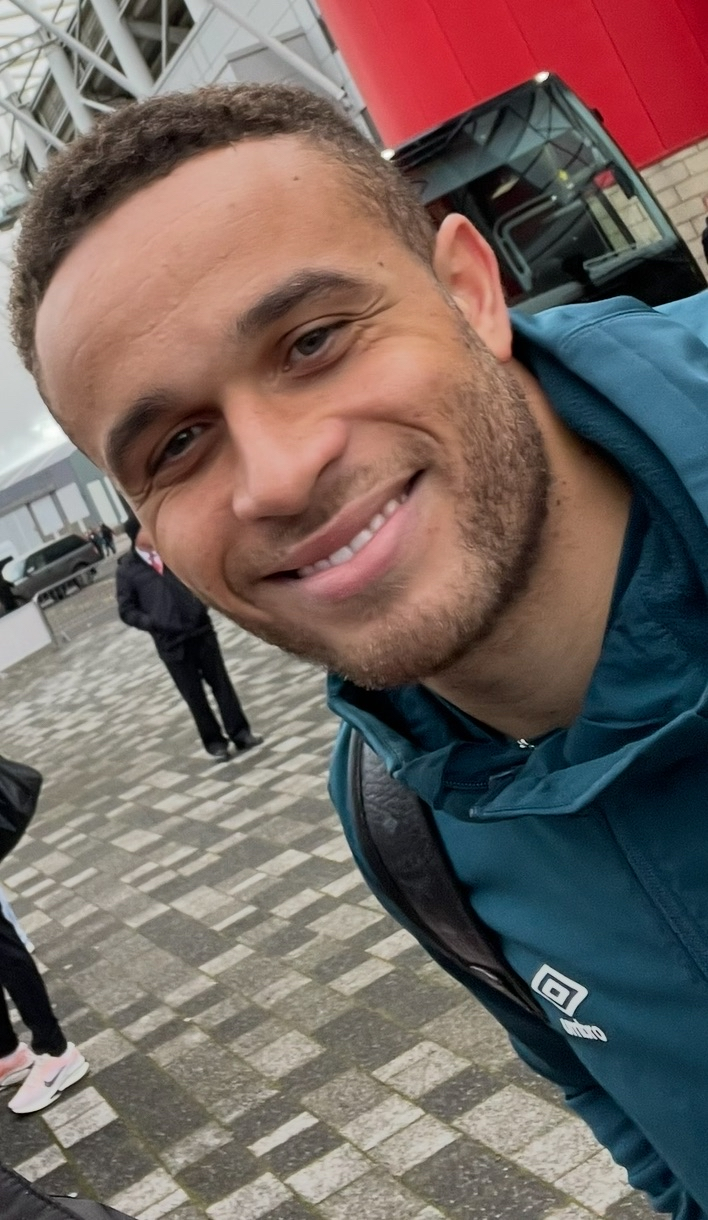
- Morris with Luton Town in 2024

Personal information
- Full name: Carlton John Morris
- Date of birth: 16 December 1995 (age 30)
- Place of birth: Histon, Cambridge, England
- Height: 6 ft 1 in (1.85 m)
- Position: Striker

Team information
- Current team: Derby County
- Number: 9

Youth career
- 2006–2014: Norwich City

Senior career*
Years	Team	Apps	(Gls)
2014–2021	Norwich City	1	(0)
2014	→ Oxford United (loan)	7	(0)
2014–2015	→ York City (loan)	8	(0)
2015–2016	→ Hamilton Academical (loan)	32	(8)
2017	→ Rotherham United (loan)	8	(0)
2017–2018	→ Shrewsbury Town (loan)	42	(6)
2019–2020	→ Rotherham United (loan)	21	(3)
2020	→ Milton Keynes Dons (loan)	10	(2)
2020–2021	→ Milton Keynes Dons (loan)	18	(3)
2021–2022	Barnsley	51	(14)
2022–2025	Luton Town	123	(39)
2025–	Derby County	42	(13)

International career
2013	England U19	3	(2)
- * Club domestic league appearances and goals as of 22:13, 6 November 2026 (UTC)

Carlton John Morris (born 16 December 1995) is an English professional footballer who plays as a striker for EFL Championship club Derby County.

Morris has previously played for Norwich City, Oxford United, York City, Hamilton Academical, Rotherham United, Shrewsbury Town and Milton Keynes Dons, Barnsley and Luton Town, and had represented England at under-19 level.

== Club career ==
=== Norwich City ===
==== Early years and breakthrough ====
Born in Cambridge, Morris began his career in the youth system at Norwich City at the age of 11. He became an academy scholar in the summer of 2012 and won the FA Youth Cup with Norwich in May 2013. In December 2013, he signed a professional contract until the summer of 2016.

==== 2014–15 ====
On 4 August 2014, Morris joined Oxford United on loan until 1 January 2015. He made his debut on 9 August 2014, starting in a 1–0 defeat to Burton Albion in League Two. He scored his first goal in professional football in his next appearance on 12 August 2014, starting again as Oxford defeated Bristol City in the first round of the League Cup. After 10 appearances, he was recalled by Norwich on 23 October 2014.

On 27 November 2014, Morris joined another League Two club, York City, on loan until 4 January 2015. He made his debut two days later as a 77th-minute substitute for Wes Fletcher in a 1–1 away draw with Plymouth Argyle. His loan was extended for another month in January 2015 before returning to Norwich on 9 February having made eight appearances for York.

==== 2015–16 ====
On 15 July 2015, Morris joined Hamilton Academical on a six-month loan, shortly after signing a contract extension with Norwich to 2017. He made his Scottish Premiership debut on 1 August in a 0–0 home draw with Partick Thistle. On 18 August, Morris scored his first goal for Hamilton in a 4–0 home victory over Dundee United. On 2 January 2016, he extended his stay until the end of the 2015–16 season. Morris returned to Norwich in May 2016, having featured in 33 matches, scoring eight goals.

==== 2016–17 ====
After featuring for Norwich under-23s in the EFL Trophy, Morris joined Championship club Rotherham United on 31 January 2017 on loan until the end of 2016–17. He was unable to link up with Rotherham until mid-March due to injury, but did sign a contract to 2020 with Norwich earlier in the month. He made his Rotherham debut as a substitute in the 5–1 defeat away to Queens Park Rangers on 18 March 2017.

==== 2017–18 ====
On 11 July 2017, Morris joined League One club Shrewsbury Town on a season-long loan, becoming their ninth summer signing. He scored his first goal for the club in a 3−2 victory over Rochdale at New Meadow on 19 August. Morris suffered a torn anterior cruciate ligament (ACL) in Shrewsbury Town's League One play-off final defeat to Rotherham United.

==== 2018–19 ====
Morris missed almost the entire season while recovering from his ACL injury, only making a few appearances for Norwich City's Under-23 squad.

==== 2019–20 ====
In May 2019 Morris signed a contract extension with Norwich to 2021 and was simultaneously loaned out to League One side Rotherham United, for whom he'd previously played in the 2016–17 season. The loan was cut short after Morris scored three league goals for them in the first half of the season. Morris then signed for Milton Keynes Dons on 7 January 2020 on a loan deal for the rest of the season.

==== 2020–21 ====
Following a successful loan spell, Morris re-joined Milton Keynes Dons on loan for the duration of the 2020–21 season. After scoring three goals from eighteen league games for the Dons, Morris was recalled by Norwich City on 6 January 2021. Later that day, Morris signed for Championship side Barnsley on a two-and-a-half-year deal, for an undisclosed fee. He scored his first goal for Barnsley in a 2–0 win against Brentford on 14 February 2021.

=== Luton Town ===
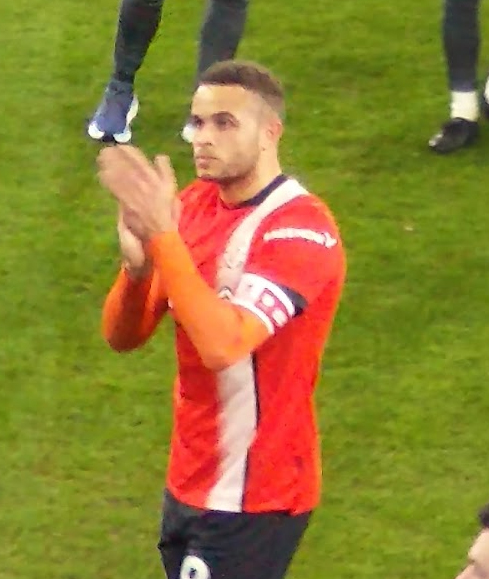
Morris with Luton Town in 2024

On 6 July 2022, Morris returned to the Championship when he signed for Luton Town for a fee of £1.3 million. Morris was awarded the EFL Championship Player of the Month for September 2022 having scored four goals during the month. Carlton Morris managed to get 20 goals in his first season at Luton as Luton got promoted to the Premier league.

Morris scored Luton Town's first ever Premier League goal on 12 August 2023 in a 4–1 away loss to Brighton and Hove Albion when he converted a penalty kick in the 81st minute. On 30 September 2023, he scored the winning goal against Everton at Goodison Park to give Luton Town its first ever Premier League victory. Morris was an ever present in Luton's Premier League campaign, scoring 11 goals as they were relegated back to the Championship; he was the club's top scorer during the season.

During the 2024–25 season, Morris scored eight times in 43 appearances from Luton as the club suffered back-to-back relegations, this time dropping down to League One. In three years at Luton, Morris scored 39 goals in 137 appearances.

=== Derby County ===
On 26 June 2025, it was confirmed the Morris had left Luton and joined fellow Championship side Derby County for an undisclosed fee, signing a three-year contract. He scored on his debut for the club, an acrobatic volley in a 3-1 defeat to Stoke City on the opening day of the Championship season. On 1 November, Morris scored his first career hat-trick in a 3–1 victory away at Sheffield United. Morrisscored 10 goals in his first 16 appearances for Derby. On 22 November 2025, he picked up an ankle injury during a game against Watford, with an expected time on the sidelines being three months. After his three-month absence, Morris returned to action on 14 February 2026. On 6 April 2026, Morris scored his first Derby goal in five months in a 2–0 win over Stoke City. He made 31 appearances, scoring 12 goals in his first season at Derby County, becoming the clubs top scoring during the 2025–26 season.

== International career ==
Having been a former youth international, Morris represented England at U19 level, earning 3 caps across 2013.

== Style of play ==
Morris has often been noted for his physicality, having been described by his coaches at Oxford United as strong and able to hold up the ball.

== Career statistics ==
As of match played 6 November 2026

Appearances and goals by club, season and competition
Club	Season	League			National cup (Note: Includes FA Cup, Scottish Cup)		League cup (Note: Includes EFL Cup)		Other		Total	
Club	Season	Division	Apps	Goals	Apps	Goals	Apps	Goals	Apps	Goals	Apps	Goals
Norwich City	2014–15	Championship	1	0	—		—		0	0	1	0
Norwich City	2015–16	Premier League	0	0	—		—		—		0	0
Norwich City	2016–17	Championship	0	0	0	0	0	0	—		0	0
Norwich City	2017–18	Championship	0	0	0	0	0	0	—		0	0
Norwich City	2018–19	Championship	0	0	0	0	0	0	—		0	0
Norwich City	2019–20	Premier League	0	0	0	0	0	0	—		0	0
Norwich City	2020–21	Championship	0	0	0	0	0	0	—		0	0
Norwich City	Total		1	0	0	0	0	0	0	0	1	0
Norwich City U23	2016–17	—			—		—		4 (Note: Appearance(s) in Football League/EFL Trophy)	1	4	1
Oxford United (loan)	2014–15	League Two	7	0	0	0	2	1	1	0	10	1
York City (loan)	2014–15	League Two	8	0	—		—		—		8	0
Hamilton Academical (loan)	2015–16	Scottish Premiership	32	8	1	0	0	0	—		33	8
Rotherham United (loan)	2016–17	Championship	8	0	—		—		—		8	0
Shrewsbury Town (loan)	2017–18	League One	42	6	4	1	0	0	8 (Note: Five appearances and two goals in EFL Trophy, three appearances and one goal in League One play-offs)	3	54	10
Rotherham United (loan)	2019–20	League One	21	3	3	0	1	0	3	1	28	4
Milton Keynes Dons (loan)	2019–20	League One	10	2	—		—		—		10	2
Milton Keynes Dons (loan)	2020–21	League One	18	3	2	0	1	0	3	1	24	4
Milton Keynes Dons (loan)	Total		28	5	2	0	1	0	3	1	34	6
Barnsley	2020–21	Championship	23	7	0	0	0	0	2	0	25	7
Barnsley	2021–22	Championship	28	7	2	2	0	0	—		30	9
Barnsley	Total		51	14	2	2	0	0	2	0	55	16
Luton Town	2022–23	Championship	44	20	3	0	1	0	3 (Note: Appearances in Championship play-offs)	0	51	20
Luton Town	2023–24	Premier League	38	11	4	0	1	0	—		43	11
Luton Town	2024–25	Championship	41	8	1	0	1	0	—		43	8
Luton Town	Total		123	39	8	0	3	0	3	0	137	39
Derby County	2025–26	Championship	31	12	0	0	0	0	—		31	12
Derby County	2026–27	Championship	11	1	0	0	1	0	—		12	1
Derby County	Total		42	13	0	0	1	0	0	0	43	13
Career total			363	88	20	3	8	1	24	6	415	98

== Honours ==
Shrewsbury Town

- EFL Trophy runner-up: 2017–18

Luton Town

- EFL Championship play-offs: 2023

Individual

- PFA Team of the Year: 2022–23 Championship
- EFL Championship Player of the Month: September 2022
