= Ziggy Gordon =

Scottish footballer

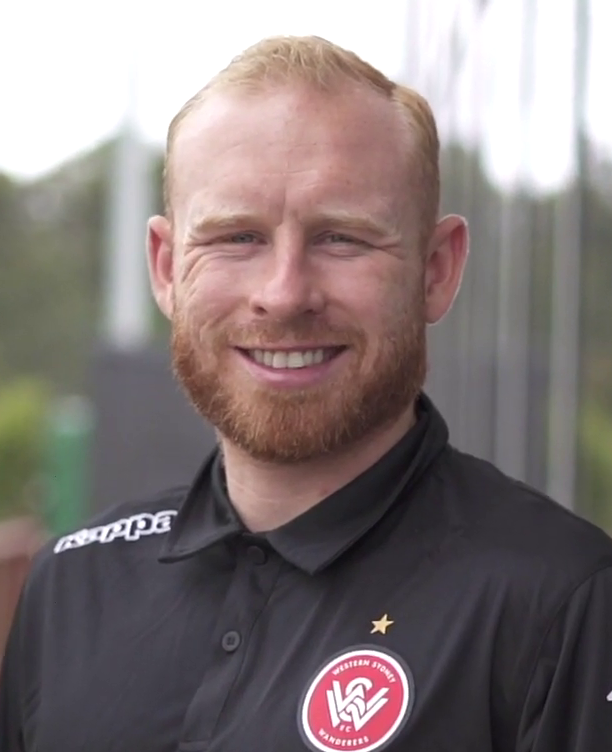
- Gordon in 2020

Personal information
- Full name: Zygmunt Ian Gordon
- Date of birth: 23 April 1993 (age 33)
- Position: Full-back

Team information
- Current team: Sydney Olympic
- Number: 5

Youth career
- Anniesland
- 2003–2011: Hamilton Academical

Senior career*
Years	Team	Apps	(Gls)
2011–2016	Hamilton Academical	138	(5)
2016–2017	Partick Thistle	14	(0)
2017–2018	Jagiellonia Białystok	11	(0)
2018	Pogoń Siedlce	14	(0)
2018–2019	Hamilton Academical	35	(2)
2019–2020	Central Coast Mariners	26	(0)
2020–2022	Western Sydney Wanderers	38	(2)
2023–	Sydney Olympic	56	(1)

International career
2011	Scotland U19	2	(0)
- * Club domestic league appearances and goals as of 6 December 2024

Zygmunt Ian Gordon (born 23 April 1993) is a Scottish professional footballer who plays as a full-back for Sydney Olympic.

Gordon has previously played in his native Scotland for Hamilton and Partick Thistle, and in Poland for Jagiellonia Białystok and Pogoń Siedlce. He represented Scotland twice at the under-19 international level.

== Club career ==
=== Hamilton Academical ===
Gordon made his professional debut for Hamilton Academical on 1 February 2011, in a 0–2 defeat against St Johnstone in the Scottish Premier League. He signed a new two-year contract extension in April 2012.

Before the start of the 2012–13 season, Gordon stated his determination to become a first-team regular. In November 2012, Gordon stated that he believed the club's position in the league table was not merited by their recent performances, while in January 2013 he stated that recent results were not a reflection of recent performances. In February 2013 he stated that the club's upcoming "hectic" game schedule was not concerning. On 5 March 2013, in a league game against Morton, Gordon scored his first goal for the club. Gordon was awarded the 'Man of the Match' award for his performance in that game. Gordon later commented that he hoped his goal, and the victory, would spur the team onto a good run of form in the league. Gordon was named Hamilton's Player of the Year for the 2012–13 season.

Ahead of the 2013–14 season, Gordon talked about the importance of home advantage in the forthcoming campaign. He signed a new two-year contract extension in February 2014. In April 2014 he was selected to the 2013–14 Championship PFA Scotland Team of the Year, alongside Hamilton teammates Anthony Andreu and Ali Crawford.

In January 2015 the club rejected a transfer bid for Gordon from Polish club Jagiellonia Białystok. In May 2016 it was announced that Gordon would leave the club at the end of the season.

=== Partick Thistle ===
Gordon signed for Partick Thistle in July 2016.

=== Poland ===
Gordon signed Jagiellonia Białystok in January 2017. He left the Ekstraklasa club in January 2018 as his contract was mutually terminated. Gordon signed for Pogoń Siedlce in February 2018.

=== Return to Hamilton ===
Gordon returned to Hamilton Academical in June 2018, signing a one-year contract. He left the club following the expiry of his contract.

In May 2019 it was announced he would sign for Romanian club Dinamo București. However, in June 2019 the deal was cancelled.

=== Australia ===
Gordon joined A-League club Central Coast Mariners in June 2019. In November 2020, Gordon signed a one-year contract extension with the club. Despite this, a month later he departed the club.

In December 2020, after leaving Central Coast Mariners, Gordon joined Western Sydney Wanderers. He left the club in May 2022.

He joined Sydney Olympic for the 2023 season.

== International career ==
He made his international debut for Scotland U19 in May 2011.

== Personal life ==
Gordon is of Polish descent. His mother Barbara's family hail from Kraków, meaning he is also eligible to represent Poland at international level.

In May 2017 he criticised coaching standards in Scottish football, stating that Polish coaches were far superior. His claims were dismissed by Scottish coaches Ian McCall and Tam McManus.

He was a national champion in chess as a child, choosing to concentrate on football after youth matches clashed with tournaments in the board game at weekends.

== Career statistics ==
As of 26 November 2019

Appearances and goals by club, season and competition
Club	Season	League		National Cup		League Cup		Other		Total	
Club	Season	Apps	Goals	Apps	Goals	Apps	Goals	Apps	Goals	Apps	Goals
Hamilton Academical	2010–11	2	0	0	0	0	0	0	0	2	0
Hamilton Academical	2011–12	8	0	0	0	1	0	1	0	10	0
Hamilton Academical	2012–13	32	1	2	0	2	0	0	0	36	1
Hamilton Academical	2013–14	34	2	1	0	3	0	5	0	43	2
Hamilton Academical	2014–15	24	0	1	0	4	0	0	0	29	0
Hamilton Academical	2015–16	38	2	1	0	1	0	0	0	40	2
Hamilton Academical	Total	138	5	5	0	11	0	6	0	160	5
Partick Thistle	2016–17	14	0	0	0	5	0	0	0	19	0
Jagiellonia Białystok	2016–17	9	0	0	0	—		—		9	0
Jagiellonia Białystok	2017–18	2	0	1	0	—		—		3	0
Jagiellonia Białystok	Total	11	0	1	0	—		—		12	0
Pogoń Siedlce	2017–18	12	0	0	0	—		2 (Note: Appearances in I liga relegation play-offs)	0	14	0
Hamilton Academical	2018–19	35	2	1	0	4	0	0	0	40	2
Central Coast Mariners	2019–20	6	0	4	0	0	0	0	0	10	0
Career total		216	7	11	0	20	0	8	0	255	7
