= Darian MacKinnon =

Scottish footballer (born 1985)

Personal information
- Date of birth: 9 October 1985 (age 41)
- Place of birth: Scotland
- Positions: Midfielder; striker

Team information
- Current team: Hamilton Academical (head coach)

Senior career*
Years	Team	Apps	(Gls)
- Dumbarton United
- Dumbarton Harp
- St. Thomas'
- St. Patrick's Athletic
2010–2012	Clydebank	45	(22)
2012–2020	Hamilton Academical	215	(10)
2012	→ Ayr United (loan)	8	(3)
2020	Partick Thistle	2	(0)
2020–2022	Drumchapel United		
2025–2026	Hamilton Academical	2	(0)

Managerial career
- 2025–2026: Hamilton Academical (interim)
- 2026–: Hamilton Academical
- * Club domestic league appearances and goals

Darian MacKinnon (born 9 October 1985) is a Scottish football coach and former player who is the head coach at Hamilton Academical.

MacKinnon played as a midfielder and striker and spent his early career in Junior football with Dumbarton United, Dumbarton Harp, St. Thomas', St. Patrick's Athletic and Clydebank, before turning professional with Hamilton Academical in 2012. He also played League football for Ayr United and Partick Thistle, before returning to the Junior ranks with Drumchapel United in 2020.

== Early and personal life ==
At 16 he was charged with assault, and at 18 he was sentenced to four-and-a-half years in prison. He spent two years and seven months in a young offenders institution. He became a father for the first time shortly after being released.

== Career ==
MacKinnon began his career with Dumbarton United, Dumbarton Harp, St. Thomas' and St. Patrick's Athletic, before joining Clydebank in May 2010. Playing as a forward at Clydebank, he scored 31 goals in 69 appearances in all competitions. He combined his Junior career with working on a building site.

He turned professional with Hamilton Academical in July 2012, making the unusual move up from the Junior level directly to the second tier of Scotland's professional setup at the age of 26. After two appearances in cup competitions, he made his debut in the Scottish Football League on 11 August 2012, appearing as an 80th-minute substitute. He joined Ayr United on an emergency loan deal in September 2012. Following his return to Hamilton, MacKinnon scored his team's equalising goal in a 1–1 draw with Falkirk after appearing as a substitute, after which he stated that he wanted to start the next game. MacKinnon later spoke about his hopes for a good run in the Scottish Cup, and stated that the quarter-final against Falkirk on 2 March 2013 was the "biggest game" of his career. A few days later, on 8 March 2013, MacKinnon signed a two-year extension to his contract. In April 2013, MacKinnon publicly stated his support for new caretaker manager Alex Neil. MacKinnon came fourth in the Hamilton 'Player of the Year Awards' for 2012–13, his first season in professional football; he stated he would continue to fight for a place in the team.

Once his second season began, MacKinnon spoke about how pleased he was with how the team were doing. At the end of the season, he was part of the Accies team which won promotion to the Scottish Premiership, via a play-off win over Hibernian.

In September 2014, MacKinnon was given a four-match ban after being sent off in a prior game. In January 2016 he signed a new contract with the club until the summer of 2017, and in December 2016 he signed a new contract until May 2019.

Having begun to combine his Accies playing role with youth coaching duties at the club, in June 2018 the Under-17 team coached by MacKinnon (along with Dougie Imrie) became Scottish champions in the age group, qualifying for the UEFA Youth League. In July 2018 he became Hamilton's captain. As of March 2019 he was coaching the club's under-16s.

MacKinnon was released by Hamilton in January 2020, and he was then signed by Partick Thistle.

On 5 July 2020, MacKinnon joined Drumchapel United.

In August 2022 he returned to Hamilton Academical as a first-team coach. By May 2024 he was assistant manager to John Rankin. He began playing for the club again in September 2025. In November 2025 he became interim head coach, following the resignation of John Rankin. The position became permanent in February 2026.

== Career statistics ==
As of 10 November 2019

Appearances and goals by club, season and competition
Club	Season	League			Scottish Cup		League Cup		Other		Total	
Club	Season	Division	Apps	Goals	Apps	Goals	Apps	Goals	Apps	Goals	Apps	Goals
Clydebank	2009–10	WoS SL First Division	1	0	0	0	—		3 (Note: One appearance in the Evening Times Cup and two in the West of Scotland Super League play-offs)	0	4	0
Clydebank	2010–11	WoS SL First Division	24	8	0	0	—		8 (Note: Two appearances in the Central League Cup, one in the Scottish Junior Cup, four in the Sectional League Cup and one in the West of Scotland Cup)	2	32	10
Clydebank	2011–12	WoS SL Premier League	20	14	0	0	—		13 (Note: Five appearances in the Central League Cup, one in the Evening Times Cup, two in the Scottish Junior Cup, four in the Sectional League Cup and one in the West of Scotland Cup)	7	33	21
Clydebank	Total		45	22	0	0	0	0	24	9	69	31
Hamilton Academical	2012–13	First Division	24	1	3	0	1	1	1 (Note: Appearance in the Scottish Challenge Cup)	0	29	2
Hamilton Academical	2013–14	Championship	31	3	1	0	3	0	5 (Note: One appearance in the Scottish Challenge Cup; four appearances and a goal in the Premiership play-offs)	1	40	4
Hamilton Academical	2014–15	Premiership	30	3	1	0	3	0	0	0	34	3
Hamilton Academical	2015–16	Premiership	31	1	1	0	1	0	0	0	33	1
Hamilton Academical	2016–17	Premiership	33	0	3	0	5	0	1 (Note: Appearance in the Premiership play-offs)	0	42	0
Hamilton Academical	2017–18	Premiership	31	1	1	0	4	1	0	0	36	2
Hamilton Academical	2018–19	Premiership	29	1	0	0	4	0	0	0	33	1
Hamilton Academical	2019–20	Premiership	6	0	0	0	5	0	0	0	11	0
Hamilton Academical	Total		215	10	10	0	26	2	7	1	258	13
Ayr United (loan)	2012–13	Second Division	8	3	0	0	0	0	0	0	8	3
Career total			268	35	10	0	26	2	31	10	335	47
