= David Luongo =

French footballer (born 1988)

Personal information
- Date of birth: 13 March 1988 (age 38)
- Height: 1.80 m (5 ft 11 in)
- Position: Striker

Senior career*
| Years | Team | Apps | (Gls) |
| 2007–2008 | FC Meyrin | | |
| 2008–2009 | CS Chênois | | |
| 2009–2012 | Stade Nyonnais | 46 | (3) |
| 2012–2013 | Livingston | 0 | (0) |
| Total | | 46+ | (3+) |
- * Club domestic league appearances and goals

David Luongo (born 13 March 1988) is a French motocross CEO and former professional footballer who played as a striker.

== Football career ==
After playing for Swiss clubs FC Meyrin, CS Chênois and Stade Nyonnais, Luongo signed for Scottish club Livingston in June 2012, alongside Anthony Andreu. He never appeared for the club, and left the following summer.

== Motocross career ==
Luongo later became involved with motocross, becoming. CEO of Infront Moto Racing.
