= Tony Andreu =

French footballer (born 1988)

Personal information
- Full name: Anthony Andreu
- Date of birth: 22 May 1988 (age 38)
- Place of birth: Cagnes-sur-Mer, France
- Position: Midfielder

Youth career
- Monaco

Senior career*
Years	Team	Apps	(Gls)
- Chênois
2009–2012	Stade Nyonnais	77	(10)
2012–2013	Livingston	33	(7)
2013–2015	Hamilton Academical	58	(25)
2015–2017	Norwich City	6	(0)
2015–2016	→ Rotherham United (loan)	11	(2)
2016–2017	→ Dundee United (loan)	31	(13)
2017–2019	Coventry City	15	(1)
2019	→ Hamilton Academical (loan)	17	(1)
2019–2020	St Mirren	28	(2)
2021	Ross County	6	(0)
2022	UE Sant Julià	6	(1)
- * Club domestic league appearances and goals as of 14:49, 1 January 2024 (UTC)

Anthony Andreu (born 22 May 1988) is a French professional footballer who plays as a midfielder.

He began his career as a youth player at Monaco, before playing in Switzerland with CS Chênois and Stade Nyonnais. He moved to Scotland in 2012, initially with Livingston, before joining Hamilton Academical. He signed for English club Norwich City in 2015 and was also loaned to Rotherham United before joining Dundee United for the 2016–17 season. He signed for Coventry City in August 2017, returning on loan to Hamilton in January 2019. In July 2019 he signed for Scottish Premier League team St Mirren.

== Career ==
=== Early career ===
Andreu spent his early career in France and Switzerland with Monaco, Chênois and Stade Nyonnais.

While playing in Switzerland, Andreu started writing poetry; he is also a fan of books, stating "I have a lot of free time. I love to read – whether it is thrillers, crime stories or more philosophical themes – and I recently bought a book about French history. I sometimes write poems and I note down details about the books I've read."

=== Livingston ===
He signed for Scottish club Livingston in June 2012, alongside David Luongo. It was revealed by John Hughes that the director of football John Collins signed the duo, with the help from Collins' French connections by inviting them on trial, which impressed Hughes' management.

He made his debut for Livingston in the first round of the Scottish Challenge Cup, in a 1–0 loss against Annan Athletic. Andreu scored his first goal in the closing minutes of the match as they beat Falkirk on 2 September 2013. On 2 March 2013, Andreu scored twice in a 4–1 win over Airdrieonians. In a BBC Scotland interview, Andreu's name was mentioned by the UEFA general secretary, David Taylor.

On 2 May 2013, it was announced that he was leaving the club at the end of the 2012–13 season. While at Livingston, Andreu met Julia, daughter of then director of football John Collins (who was responsible for signing him) and they entered into a relationship.

=== Hamilton Academical ===
He signed a one-year contract with Hamilton Academical on 1 August 2013, having appeared for the club in the Scottish Challenge Cup a few days earlier as a trialist. He signed a new two-year contract with the club in March 2014. In April 2014, he was nominated for the 2013–14 PFA Scotland's Player of the Year award in the Championship section, but lost out to Hemmings. He was also selected to the 2013–14 Championship PFA Scotland Team of the Year, alongside Hamilton teammates Ziggy Gordon and Ali Crawford.

In the last game of the season, Andreu scored a hat-trick in the first half as they thrashed Greenock Morton. However, the win wouldn't guarantee promotion after Dundee also won on the same day.

He scored the winning goal in the promotion play-off semi-final against Falkirk on 18 May 2014. After losing 2–0 to Hibernian in the first leg, Andreu scored a last minute goal in a 2–0 win at Easter Road to level the tie on aggregate. Hamilton won 4–3 in a penalty shoot-out (with Andreu converting the second kick) to relegate Hibernian and achieve promotion to the Premiership. After the match, Andreu described playing in the Scottish Premiership in the 2014–15 season as "a dream come true" and said the club deserved to be promoted.

=== Norwich City ===
He moved to English club Norwich City on 2 February 2015 reuniting with his former Hamilton manager Alex Neil.

==== Rotherham United (loan) ====
Andreu moved on loan to Rotherham United on 1 September 2015. On 26 September, he scored his first goal for Rotherham in a 2–0 win over Birmingham City. On 7 January 2016, he returned to Norwich City to fight for his place in the first team, despite Rotherham manager Neil Redfearn's wishes to extend the loan.

==== Dundee United (loan) ====
He signed on loan for Dundee United in August 2016. On his debut he scored the winning goal in a Scottish Challenge Cup tie against Peterhead on 3 September 2016. He also scored in the 2017 Scottish Challenge Cup Final as United beat St Mirren 2–1.

=== Coventry City ===
On 10 August 2017, Andreu left Norwich City by mutual consent. On the same day he signed a two-year contract with Coventry City. He scored his first goal for Coventry in an EFL Trophy tie against Shrewsbury Town on 29 August 2017.

During Coventry's 1–0 win against Port Vale on 9 September 2017, Andreu suffered an injury to his anterior cruciate ligament which would rule him out for the rest of the 2017–18 season.

He returned to Hamilton on loan in January 2019.

=== St Mirren ===
On 4 July 2019 Andreu signed for St Mirren on a one-year deal after being released by Coventry City. On 2 June 2020 it was announced that he would remain with the club under the coronavirus furlough scheme before leaving the club.

=== Ross County ===
On 7 January 2021, Andreu signed for Scottish side Ross County on a short-term deal until the end of the season. He was released by County on 27 May 2021 along with nine other players.

=== UE Sant Julià ===
Andreu signed for UE Sant Julià in Primera Divisió in Andorra on 2 February 2022 until the end of the 2021–22 season.

== Playing style ==
Andreu's playing style has been compared to Cesc Fabregas by former Rangers defender Dave MacKinnon.

== Career statistics ==
As of match played 27 February 2021

Appearances and goals by club, season and competition
Club	Season	League			Cup		League Cup		Other		Total	
Club	Season	Division	Apps	Goals	Apps	Goals	Apps	Goals	Apps	Goals	Apps	Goals
Stade Nyonnais	2009–10	Swiss Challenge League	29	2	–	–	–	–	–	–	29	2
Stade Nyonnais	2010–11	Swiss Challenge League	21	2	–	–	–	–	–	–	21	2
Stade Nyonnais	2011–12	Swiss Challenge League	27	6	–	–	–	–	–	–	27	6
Stade Nyonnais	Total		77	10	–	–	–	–	–	–	77	10
Livingston	2012–13	Scottish First Division	33	7	1	0	3	0	1 (Note: Appearance in the Scottish Challenge Cup.)	0	38	7
Hamilton Academical	2013–14	Scottish Championship	35	13	1	0	3	0	5 (Note: One appearance in the Scottish Challenge Cup and four in the play-offs.)	2	44	15
Hamilton Academical	2014–15	Scottish Premiership	23	12	0	0	3	1	0	0	26	13
Hamilton Academical	Total		58	25	1	0	6	1	5	2	70	28
Norwich City	2014–15	Championship	6	0	0	0	0	0	0	0	6	0
Norwich City	2015–16	Premier League	0	0	0	0	1	0	0	0	1	0
Norwich City	2016–17	Championship	0	0	0	0	1	0	1 (Note: Appearance(s) in the Football League Trophy.)	3	2	3
Norwich City	2017–18	Championship	0	0	0	0	0	0	0	0	0	0
Norwich City	Total		6	0	0	0	2	0	1	3	9	3
Rotherham United (loan)	2015–16	Championship	11	2	0	0	1	0	0	0	12	2
Dundee United (loan)	2016–17	Scottish Championship	31	13	1	2	0	0	10 (Note: Four appearances in the Scottish Challenge Cup and six in the play-offs.)	4	42	19
Coventry City	2017–18	League Two	5	0	0	0	0	0	1	1	6	1
Coventry City	2018–19	League One	10	1	0	0	0	0	2	0	12	1
Coventry City	Total		15	1	0	0	0	0	3	1	18	2
Hamilton Academical (loan)	2018–19	Scottish Premiership	17	1	1	0	0	0	—		18	1
St Mirren	2019–20	Scottish Premiership	28	2	4	0	4	0	—		36	2
Ross County	2020–21	Scottish Premiership	6	0	0	0	0	0	—		6	0
Career total			282	61	8	2	16	1	20	10	326	74

== Honours ==
Dundee United

- Scottish Challenge Cup: 2016-17
