= 2013–14 Scottish Premiership =

108th season of top-tier football league in Scotland

Scottish Premiership
- Season: 2013–14
- Dates: 2 August 2013 – 11 May 2014
- Champions: Celtic; 1st Premiership title 45th Scottish title
- Relegated: Hibernian; Heart of Midlothian
- Champions League: Celtic
- Europa League: Motherwell; Aberdeen; St Johnstone
- Matches: 228
- Goals: 626 (2.75 per match)
- Top goalscorer: Kris Commons (27 goals)
- Biggest home win: Celtic 6–0 Inverness CT (27 April 2014)
- Biggest away win: Motherwell 0–5 Celtic (6 December 2013)
- Highest scoring: Kilmarnock 2–5 Celtic (28 September 2013); St Mirren 4–3 St Johnstone (19 October 2013); Inverness CT 3–4 Aberdeen (21 December 2013); Motherwell 4–3 Partick Thistle (15 February 2014); Celtic 5-2 Aberdeen (3 May 2014)
- Longest winning run: 15 games Celtic
- Longest unbeaten run: 26 games Celtic
- Longest winless run: 13 games Hibernian
- Longest losing run: 6 games Hibernian
- Highest attendance: 52,670; Celtic 1–0 Partick Thistle (1 January 2014)
- Lowest attendance: 1,892; St Johnstone 1–0 Motherwell (25 February 2014)
- Total attendance: 2,331,965
- Average attendance: 10,183 (312)

The 2013–14 Scottish Premiership was the first season of the Scottish Premiership, the highest division of Scottish football. The season began on 2 August 2013 and concluded on 11 May 2014. This was the first season of the competition being part of the newly formed Scottish Professional Football League after the merger of the Scottish Premier League and the Scottish Football League. This season also featured the introduction of an end of season play-off between the 11th-placed team in the top flight and the teams placed 2nd–4th in the Scottish Championship, to determine whether a second team will be relegated from the league.

Twelve teams contested the league. Partick Thistle (champions) were promoted from the 2012–13 First Division, replacing Dundee (relegated). Heart of Midlothian were deducted 15 points (one-third of the previous season's total) for entering administration during the close season.

On 26 March, Celtic clinched their third title in a row and 45th in total after a 5–1 away win against Partick Thistle. It is the earliest that the title has been won since the 1928–29 season, when Rangers won it on 16 March, until the 2020–21 Season when Rangers won the title on 7 March.

== Teams ==
Location of teams in Scottish Premier League 2013–14

Dundee were relegated from the 2012–13 Scottish Premier League. Partick Thistle, who won the 2012–13 Scottish First Division, were promoted.

=== Stadia and locations ===
Team	Stadium	Capacity
Aberdeen	Pittodrie Stadium, Aberdeen	21,421
Celtic	Celtic Park, Glasgow	60,355
Dundee United	Tannadice Park, Dundee	14,229
Heart of Midlothian	Tynecastle Stadium, Edinburgh	17,529
Hibernian	Easter Road, Edinburgh	20,421
Inverness Caledonian Thistle	Caledonian Stadium, Inverness	7,800
Kilmarnock	Rugby Park, Kilmarnock	18,128
Motherwell	Fir Park, Motherwell	13,677
Partick Thistle	Firhill Stadium, Glasgow	10,102
Ross County	Victoria Park, Dingwall	6,541
St Johnstone	McDiarmid Park, Perth	10,696
St Mirren	St Mirren Park, Paisley	8,023

=== Personnel and kits ===
Note: Flags indicate national team as has been defined under FIFA eligibility rules. Players may hold more than one non-FIFA nationality.

Team	Manager	Captain	Kit manufacturer	Shirt sponsor
Aberdeen	(Scotland) Derek McInnes	(Scotland) Russell Anderson	Adidas	Team Recruitment
Celtic	(Northern Ireland) Neil Lennon	(Scotland) Scott Brown	Nike	Magners
Dundee United	(Scotland) Jackie McNamara	(Republic of Ireland) Seán Dillon	Nike	Calor
Heart of Midlothian	(Scotland) Gary Locke	(Scotland) Danny Wilson	Adidas	Wonga.com
Hibernian	(England) Terry Butcher	(Scotland) Liam Craig	Nike	Crabbie's
Inverness CT	(Scotland) John Hughes	(Republic of Ireland) Richie Foran	Erreà	Orion Group
Kilmarnock	(Scotland) Allan Johnston	(Italy) Manuel Pascali	Killie 1869	QTS
Motherwell	(Scotland) Stuart McCall	(Scotland) Keith Lasley	Puma	Cash Converters
Partick Thistle	(Scotland) Alan Archibald	(Scotland) Sean Welsh	Joma	macb
Ross County	(Scotland) Derek Adams	(Scotland) Richard Brittain	Diadora	Stanley CRC Evans Offshore
St Johnstone	(Northern Ireland) Tommy Wright	(Scotland) Dave Mackay	Joma	GS Brown Construction
St Mirren	(Scotland) Danny Lennon	(Republic of Ireland) Jim Goodwin	Diadora	Blacks Outdoor Retail

=== Managerial changes ===
Team	Outgoing manager	Manner of departure	Date of vacancy	Position in table	Incoming manager	Date of appointment
St Johnstone	(Northern Ireland) Steve Lomas	Signed by Millwall	6 June 2013	Pre-season	(Northern Ireland) Tommy Wright	10 June 2013
Kilmarnock	(Northern Ireland) Kenny Shiels	Sacked	11 June 2013	Pre-season	(Scotland) Allan Johnston	25 June 2013
Hibernian	(Republic of Ireland) Pat Fenlon	Resigned	1 November 2013	7th	(England) Terry Butcher	12 November 2013
Inverness CT	(England) Terry Butcher	Signed by Hibernian	12 November 2013	2nd	(Scotland) John Hughes	4 December 2013

== League table ==
Pos	Team	Pld	W	D	L	GF	GA	GD	Pts	Qualification or relegation
1	Celtic (C)	38	31	6	1	102	25	+77	99	Qualification for the Champions League second qualifying round
2	Motherwell	38	22	4	12	64	60	+4	70	Qualification for the Europa League second qualifying round
3	Aberdeen	38	20	8	10	53	38	+15	68	Qualification for the Europa League first qualifying round
4	Dundee United	38	16	10	12	65	50	+15	58	
5	Inverness Caledonian Thistle	38	16	9	13	44	44	0	57	
6	St Johnstone	38	15	8	15	48	42	+6	53	Qualification for the Europa League second qualifying round (Note: St Johnstone, as winners of the 2013–14 Scottish Cup, qualified for the Europa League second qualifying round.)
7	Ross County	38	11	7	20	44	62	−18	40	
8	St Mirren	38	10	9	19	39	58	−19	39	
9	Kilmarnock	38	11	6	21	45	66	−21	39	
10	Partick Thistle	38	8	14	16	46	65	−19	38	
11	Hibernian (R)	38	8	11	19	31	51	−20	35	Qualification for the Premiership play-off final
12	Heart of Midlothian (R)	38	10	8	20	45	65	−20	23 (Note: Heart of Midlothian were deducted 15 points for entering administration)	Relegation to the Championship

Source: SPFL Archive
Rules for classification: 1) points; 2) goal difference; 3) number of goals scored.
(C) Champions; (R) Relegated

== Results ==
=== Matches 1–22 ===
Teams play each other twice, once at home, once away.

Home \ Away	ABE	CEL	DUN	HOM	HIB	INV	KIL	MOT	PAR	ROS	STJ	STM
Aberdeen		0–2	1–0	1–3	1–0	1–0	2–1	0–1	4–0	1–0	0–0	2–0
Celtic	3–1		1–1	2–0	1–0	2–2	4–0	2–0	1–0	2–1	2–1	1–0
Dundee United	1–2	0–1		4–1	2–2	0–1	1–0	2–2	4–1	1–0	4–0	4–0
Heart of Midlothian	2–1	1–3	0–0		1–0	0–2	0–4	0–1	0–2	2–2	0–2	0–2
Hibernian	0–2	1–1	1–1	2–1		0–2	3–0	0–1	1–1	0–0	0–0	2–0
Inverness Caledonian Thistle	3–4	0–1	1–1	2–0	3–0		2–1	2–0	1–2	1–2	1–0	3–0
Kilmarnock	0–1	2–5	1–4	2–0	1–2	1–2		0–2	2–1	2–0	0–0	2–1
Motherwell	1–3	0–5	0–4	2–1	1–0	2–0	2–1		1–0	3–1	4–0	3–0
Partick Thistle	0–3	1–2	0–0	1–1	0–1	0–0	1–1	1–5		3–3	0–1	0–3
Ross County	1–0	1–4	2–4	2–1	0–2	0–3	1–2	1–2	1–3		1–0	3–0
St Johnstone	0–2	0–1	3–0	1–0	1–2	4–0	3–1	2–0	1–1	4–0		2–0
St Mirren	1–1	0–4	4–1	1–1	0–0	0–0	1–1	0–1	1–2	2–1	4–3	

Source: BBC Sport
Legend: Blue = home team win; Yellow = draw; Red = away team win.

=== Matches 23–33 ===
Teams play every other team once (either at home or away).

Home \ Away	ABE	CEL	DUN	HOM	HIB	INV	KIL	MOT	PAR	ROS	STJ	STM
Aberdeen		2–1	1–1			0–1	2–1				1–0	
Celtic						5–0		3–0		1–1	3–0	3–0
Dundee United		0–2				2–1	3–2	3–1			0–1	3–2
Heart of Midlothian	1–1	0–2	1–2		2–0							2–1
Hibernian	0–2	0–4	1–3					3–3		2–1		2–3
Inverness Caledonian Thistle				0–0	0–0			1–2	1–0			2–2
Kilmarnock		0–3		4–2	1–1	2–0				2–2	1–2	
Motherwell	2–2			4–1			1–2		4–3	2–1		
Partick Thistle	3–1	1–5	1–1	2–4	3–1		1–1					
Ross County	1–1		3–0	1–2		1–2			1–1			2–1
St Johnstone				3–3	2–0	0–1		3–0	1–1	0–1		
St Mirren	0–1						2–0	3–2	0–0		0–1	

Source: BBC Sport
Legend: Blue = home team win; Yellow = draw; Red = away team win.

=== Matches 34–38 ===
After 33 matches, the league splits into two sections of six teams each, with teams playing every other team in their section once (either at home or away). The exact matches are determined upon the league table at the time of the split.

==== Top six ====
Home \ Away	ABE	CEL	DUN	INV	MOT	STJ
Aberdeen					0–1	1–1
Celtic	5–2		3–1	6–0		
Dundee United	1–3				5–1	
Inverness Caledonian Thistle	0–0		1–1			2–0
Motherwell		3–3		2–1		2–1
St Johnstone		3–3	2–0			

Source: BBC Sport
Legend: Blue = home team win; Yellow = draw; Red = away team win.

==== Bottom six ====
Home \ Away	HOM	HIB	KIL	PAR	ROS	STM
Heart of Midlothian			5–0	2–4	2–0	
Hibernian	1–2		0–1	1–1		
Kilmarnock				1–2		1–0
Partick Thistle					2–3	1–1
Ross County		1–0	2–1			
St Mirren	1–1	2–0			1–0	

Source: BBC Sport
Legend: Blue = home team win; Yellow = draw; Red = away team win.

== Season statistics ==
Celtic goalkeeper Fraser Forster set a new Scottish league record for length of time played without conceding a goal, which had been previously set by Bobby Clark in 1970–71. Forster's streak ended at 1,256 minutes.

=== Top scorers ===
Rank	Scorer	Club	Goals
1	(Scotland) Kris Commons	Celtic	27
2	(Scotland) Kris Boyd	Kilmarnock	22
2	(England) John Sutton	Motherwell	22
4	(Republic of Ireland) Anthony Stokes	Celtic	20
4	(Scotland) Stevie May	St Johnstone	20
6	(Northern Ireland) Billy Mckay	Inverness CT	18
7	(Northern Ireland) Niall McGinn	Aberdeen	13
7	(Scotland) Steven Thompson	St Mirren	13
9	(England) Lionel Ainsworth	Motherwell	11
9	(Turkey) Nadir Çiftçi	Dundee United	11
9	(Scotland) Kris Doolan	Partick Thistle	11
9	(Scotland) Callum Paterson	Heart of Midlothian	11

=== Assists ===
Rank	Player	Club	Assists
1	(England) Kallum Higginbotham	Partick Thistle	10
2	(Honduras) Emilio Izaguirre	Celtic	9
2	(England) Lionel Ainsworth	Motherwell	9
4	(Republic of Ireland) Anthony Stokes	Celtic	8
4	(Scotland) Iain Vigurs	Motherwell	8
6	(Scotland) Kris Commons	Celtic	7
7	(Scotland) Ryan Gauld	Dundee United	6
7	(Scotland) Paul Cairney	Hibernian	6
7	(Greece) Georgios Samaras	Celtic	6

== Premiership play-offs ==
For the first time since the 1996–97 season, promotion and relegation involving a place in the top division of the Scottish football league system was determined in part by a play-off system. The previous system used was a straight head-to-head between the team that had finished 9th (second bottom) in the Premier Division and the runner-up in the First Division. The new system involved the teams from second to fourth place in the Championship, with the first contest between the third and fourth place teams. The winner progressed to a tie with the second place Championship team. The winner of that second tie then progressed to the promotion and relegation deciding playoff against the 11th place team in the Premiership.

Quarter-final
3	Falkirk	1	3	4
4	Queen of the South	2	1	3

Semi-final
2	Hamilton Academical	1	1	2
3	Falkirk	1	0	1

Final
1	Hibernian	2	0	2 (3)
2	Hamilton Academical	0	2	2 (4)

=== Quarter-final ===
==== First leg ====
6 May 2014
19:45

Queen of the South	2–1	Falkirk
McHugh 56', 90'	Report	Alston 8'

Palmerston Park, Dumfries
Attendance: 1,996
Referee: John McKendrick

==== Second leg ====
10 May 2014
15:00

Falkirk	3–1 (a.e.t.)	Queen of the South
Loy 53'; Sibbald 70'; Alston 118'	Report	McHugh 36'

Falkirk Stadium, Falkirk
Attendance: 4,427
Referee: Calum Murray

Falkirk won 4–3 on aggregate, advanced to Semi-final.

=== Semi-final ===
==== First leg ====
13 May 2014
19:45

Falkirk	1–1	Hamilton Academical
Beck 80'	Report	MacKinnon 61'

Falkirk Stadium, Falkirk
Attendance: 4,194
Referee: John Beaton

==== Second leg ====
18 May 2014
15:00

Hamilton Academical	1–0	Falkirk
Andreu 16'	Report

New Douglas Park, Hamilton
Attendance: 4,678
Referee: Kevin Clancy

Hamilton Academical won 2–1 on aggregate, advanced to Final.

=== Final ===
==== First leg ====
21 May 2014
19:45

Hamilton Academical	0–2	Hibernian
	Report	Cummings 39', 55'

New Douglas Park, Hamilton
Attendance: 5,322
Referee: Bobby Madden

==== Second leg ====
25 May 2014
15:30

Hibernian	0–2 (a.e.t.)	Hamilton Academical
	Report	Scotland 13'; Andreu 90+3'
Penalties
Thomson (penalty missed); McGivern (penalty scored); Craig (penalty scored); Tudur Jones (penalty scored); Cummings (penalty missed)	3–4	(penalty scored) Gillespie; (penalty scored) Andreu; (penalty scored) Antoine-Curier; (penalty scored) Scotland

Easter Road, Edinburgh
Attendance: 18,031
Referee: Willie Collum

2–2 on aggregate. Hamilton Academical won 4–3 on penalties, earning promotion to the Premiership. Hibernian were relegated to the Championship.

== Awards ==
=== Annual awards ===
Award	Winner	Club
SPL Player of the Year	(Scotland) Kris Commons	(Scotland) Celtic
SPL Young Player of the Year	(Scotland) Andy Robertson	(Scotland) Dundee United
PFA Scotland Players' Player of the Year	(Scotland) Kris Commons	(Scotland) Celtic
PFA Scotland Young Player of the Year	(Scotland) Andy Robertson	(Scotland) Dundee United

PFA Scotland Team of the Year
Goalkeeper	(Scotland) Fraser Forster (Celtic)			
Defence	(Scotland) Graeme Shinnie (Inverness Caledonian Thistle)	(Netherlands) Virgil van Dijk (Celtic)	(Scotland) Mark Reynolds (Aberdeen)	(Scotland) Andy Robertson (Dundee United)
Midfield	(Scotland) Stuart Armstrong (Dundee United)	(Scotland) Peter Pawlett (Aberdeen)	(Scotland) Kris Commons (Celtic)	
Forwards	(Scotland) Stevie May (St Johnstone)	(Scotland) Kris Boyd (Kilmarnock)	(Turkey) Nadir Çiftçi (Dundee United)	

== Attendances ==
#	Football club	Average attendance
1	Celtic FC	47,079
2	Heart of Midlothian FC	14,123
3	Aberdeen FC	12,918
4	Hibernian FC	11,027
5	Dundee United FC	7,599
6	Motherwell FC	5,175
7	Partick Thistle FC	5,001
8	St. Mirren FC	4,511
9	Kilmarnock FC	4,250
10	St. Johnstone FC	3,806
11	Ross County FC	3,787
12	Inverness Caledonian Thistle FC	3,558

== See also ==
- Nine in a row
