= 2008–09 Livingston F.C. season =

Livingston F.C.
2008–09 season
- Manager: Roberto Landi; Paul Hegarty; David Hay
- Stadium: Almondvale Stadium
- Scottish First Division: 7th
- Scottish Cup: Third round
- Scottish League Cup: Third round
- Scottish Challenge Cup: Quarter-final

Season 2008–09 saw Livingston compete in the First Division. They also competed in the Challenge Cup, League Cup and the Scottish Cup.

== Overview ==
Livingston started the season brightly with manager Roberto Landi winning manager of the month for August. However their form dipped there after and a series of managers and financial problems saw them finish seventh in the League to confirm their place in the First Division. However at the start of the next season the club went into administration and were relegated to the Scottish Third Division.

=== Managers ===
Livingston had a total of three managers over the season. They started under Roberto Landi who was sacked on 1 December after only five months in charge with Paul Hegarty being appointed as manager on 5 December. On 25 April only four months into his 18-month contract Hegarty was suspended by the club over a private matter. David Hay took over as interim manager for the last two games of the season.

== Results & fixtures ==
Win Draw Loss

=== Friendlies ===
10 July 2008 Friendly	Livingston	1–1	FC Unirea	Almondvale Stadium
19:30		Liv Report

19 July 2008 Friendly	Livingston	0–2	Celtic	Almondvale Stadium
15:00		Liv Report

29 July 2008 Friendly	Livingston	0–0	Coventry City	Almondvale Stadium
19:45		Coventry City Report

=== First Division ===
2 August 2008	St Johnstone	2–0	Livingston	McDiarmid Park
15:00	MacDonald 55'; Sheerin 90' (pen.)	BBC Report		Attendance: 2,692; Referee: Brines

9 August 2008	Livingston	2–0	Ross County	Almondvale Stadium
15:00	Griffiths 12'; Talbot 66'	BBC Report	Craig (yellow card) 40' (red card); Higgins (yellow card) 63' (red card)	Attendance: 1,068; Referee: McKendrick

16 August 2008	Greenock Morton	1–2	Livingston	Cappielow
15:00	Wake 31'	BBC Report	Quinn 10'; Griffiths 12'	Attendance: 2,502; Referee: Winter

23 August 2008	Livingston	2–1	Clyde	Almondvale Stadium
15:00	McParland 39'; Griffiths 86'	BBC Report	Clarke 29'	Attendance: 1,725; Referee: McCurry

30 August 2008	Dunfermline Athletic	1–2	Livingston	East End Park
15:00	Kirk 53'	BBC Report	Griffiths 41', 74'	Attendance: 3,414; Referee: Finnie

13 September 2008	Livingston	2–1	Airdrie United	Almondvale Stadium
15:00	Elliot 90'	BBC Report	Lynch 34'; McLaughlin 64'	Attendance: 1,710; Referee: Smith

20 September 2008	Dundee	0–3	Livingston	Dens Park
15:00		Scotland on Sunday Report; BBC Report	Innes 40'; Elliot 84', 90'	Attendance: 3,631; Referee: Muir

27 September 2008	Livingston	3–1	Partick Thistle	Almondvale Stadium
15:00	Davidson 6'; Elliot 18', 82'	BBC Report	Maxwell 28'	Attendance: 2,150; Referee: O'Reilly

4 October 2008	Queen of the South	6–1	Livingston	Palmerston Park
15:00	Dobbie 3', 12'; Weatherston 45', 58'; McQuilken 75'; Burns 83'	BBC Report	Mackay 25'; Elliot (red card) 74'	Attendance: 3,266; Referee: Boyle

18 October 2008	Livingston	0–1	St Johnstone	Almondvale Stadium
15:00		BBC Report	Milne 30'	Attendance: 2,500; Referee: Finnie

25 October 2008	Clyde	2–1	Livingston	Broadwood Stadium
15:00	Trouten 63'; McSwegan 90'	BBC Report	Elliot 15'	Attendance: 820; Referee: Charleston

1 November 2008	Livingston	1–0	Greenock Morton	Almondvale Stadium
15:00	Elliot 76'	BBC Report		Attendance: 1,733; Referee: Winter

8 November 2008	Airdrie United	0–0	Livingston	Excelsior Stadium
15:00		BBC Report		Attendance: 1,201; Referee: Conroy

15 November 2008	Livingston	2–3	Dunfermline Athletic	Almondvale Stadium
15:00	McPake 5'; Elliot 62'	BBC Report	Kirk 19', 90'; Bayne 60'	Attendance: 1,760; Referee: Smith

22 November 2008	Partick Thistle	2–1	Livingston	Firhill Stadium
15:00	Buchanan 11'; McKeown 43'	BBC Report	Mackay 27' (pen.)	Attendance: 2,416; Referee: Boyle

13 December 2008	Ross County	1–4	Livingston	Victoria Park
15:00	McCulloch 45'	BBC Report	Davidson 34'; Elliot 47'; Griffiths 70'; Quinn 90'	Attendance: 2,180; Referee: Law

20 December 2008	Livingston	2–0	Queen of the South	Almondvale Stadium
15:00	McPake 51'; Elliot 55'	BBC Report	Barr (yellow card) 78' (red card)	Attendance: 1,874; Referee: Brown

30 December 2008	Dunfermline Athletic	1–0	Livingston	East End Park
19:45	Shields 65'	BBC Report		Attendance: 3,036; Referee: Muir

3 January 2009	Livingston	1–1	Airdrie United	Almondvale Stadium
15:00	Elliot 86'	BBC Report	Lynch 68'	Attendance: 1,462; Referee: O'Reilly

17 January 2009	Livingston	1–1	Clyde	Almondvale Stadium
15:00	Winters 31'	BBC Report	McLaren 41'	Attendance: 1,354

24 January 2009	Greenock Morton	2–2	Livingston	Cappielow
15:00	Wake 13'; McGuffie 16'	BBC Report	Griffiths 81'; Smith 87' (o.g.)	Attendance: 2,307; Referee: Brines

31 January 2009	Livingston	4–2	Ross County	Almondvale Stadium
15:00	One 10'; Davidson 15'; MackKay 45' (pen.); Griffiths 90'	BBC Report	Hart 50'; Higgins 15'	Attendance: Conroy; Referee: 1,378

7 February 2009	Livingston	1–2	Dundee	Almondvale Stadium
15:00	McParland 73'; Griffiths (yellow card) 77' (red card)	BBC Report	Antoine-Curier 1'; Efrem 33'	Attendance: 1,535; Referee: Boyle

14 February 2009	St Johnstone	1–0	Livingston	McDiarmid Park
15:00	Samuel 70'	BBC Report		Attendance: 2,752; Referee: Winter

21 February 2009	Dundee	4–1	Livingston	Dens Park
15:00	Shinnie 48'; Efrem 55'; Antoine-Curier 68', 79'	BBC Report	De Vita 90'	Attendance: 3,679; Referee: Finnie

28 February 2009	Livingston	2–4	Partick Thistle	Almondvale Stadium
15:00	Griffiths 52', 73'	BBC Report	Harkins 18' (pen.), 90'; Paton 34'; Rowson 47'	Attendance: 2,876

7 March 2009	Airdrie United	4–4	Livingston	Excelsior Stadium
15:00	Baird 8', 64'; Di Giacomo 54'; Cardle (red card) 60'; Smyth 66'	BBC Report	Griffiths 42', 57'; One 43', 51'	Attendance: 1,100; Referee: Nicholls

10 March 2009	Livingston	4–2	Dunfermline Athletic	Almondvale Stadium
19:30	McParland 22'; Davidson 65', 68'; Griffiths 77'	BBC Report	Bell 56'; Graham 66'	Attendance: 1,859; Referee: Calum Murray

14 March 2009	Livingston	1–0	St Johnstone	Almondvale Stadium
15:00	Griffiths 33'	BBC Report		Referee: Finnie

21 March 2009	Queen of the South	3–3	Livingston	Palmerston Park
15:00	Wilson 35'; Dobie 54', 84'	BBC Report	Griffiths 57', 90'; Winters 88'	Attendance: 2,487; Referee: Allan

4 April 2009	Clyde	0–1	Livingston	Broadwood Stadium
15:00	McLaren (red card) 57'	BBC Report	Hamill 22'	Attendance: 957; Referee: Brown

11 April 2009	Livingston	0–2	Greenock Morton	Almondvale Stadium
15:00		BBC Report	Wake 19', 83'	Attendance: 1,815; Referee: Salmond

18 April 2009	Livingston	0–1	Dundee	Almondvale Stadium
15:00		BBC Report	Young 61'; MacKenzie (yellow card) 88' (red card)	Attendance: Norris; Referee: 1,988

25 April 2009	Partick Thistle	1–0	Livingston	Firhill Stadium
15:00	Buchanan 90' (pen.)	BBC Report		Attendance: 2,803; Referee: S McDonald

2 May 2009	Ross County	2–2	Livingston	Victoria Park
15:00	Craig 53', 59' (pen.); Keddie (red card) 16'	BBC Report	Griffiths 17'; Halliday 51'	Attendance: 2,567; Referee: Somers

9 May 2009	Livingston	2–2	Queen of the South	Almondvale Stadium
15:00	Winters 7'; Griffiths 8' (pen.)	BBC Report	Tosh 60' (pen.); McLaughlin 67'	Attendance: 1,652; Referee: McDermott

=== Challenge Cup ===
26 July 2008 First round	Livingston	4–0	Stranraer	Almondvale Stadium
15:00	Griffiths 33', 72'; Hamill 67'; McParland 70'	BBC Report	Nicol (red card) 81'	Referee: Brown

12 August 2008 Second round	Livingston	1–0	Forfar Athletic	Almondvale Stadium
19:45	Griffiths 51'	BBC Report		Attendance: 800; Referee: Murray

7 September 2008 Quarter-final	Livingston	0–2	Partick Thistle	Almondvale Stadium
15:00		BBC Report	Turner 75'; Twaddle 78'	Referee: Somers

=== League Cup ===
6 August 2008 First round	East Stirlingshire	1–2 (a.e.t.)	Livingston	Ochilview Park
19:30	Graham 90'	BBC Report	Fox 80'; Smith 113'	Attendance: 360; Referee: Charleston

26 August 2008 Second round	Livingston	2–1 (a.e.t.)	St Johnstone	Almondvale Stadium
19:45	Griffiths 58'; Cuenca 95'	BBC report	Craig 46'	Attendance: 979; Referee: Nicholls

23 September 2008 Third round	Celtic	4–0	Livingston	Celtic Park
19:45	Loovens 24'; Samaras 64', 85' (pen.); Brown 81'	BBC Sport		Attendance: 23,569; Referee: Collum

=== Scottish Cup ===
29 November 2009 Third round	East Stirlingshire	2–1	Livingston	Ochilview Park
15:00	Forrester 9'; Graham 55'	BBC Report	Fox 39'	Attendance: 563; Referee: Charleston

== Statistics ==
=== Squad ===
No.	Pos	Nat	Player	Total		Third Division		Scottish Cup		League Cup		Alba Challenge Cup	
No.	Pos	Nat	Player	Apps	Goals	Apps	Goals	Apps	Goals	Apps	Goals	Apps	Goals
	GK	(France) FRA	Pierre-Antoine Martini	17	0	13	0	1	0	1	0	2	0
	GK	(Scotland) SCO	Roddy McKenzie	27	0	24	0	0	0	2	0	1	0
	DF	(Scotland) SCO	Cameron MacDonald	20	0	17	0	0	0	1	0	2	0
	DF	(Scotland) SCO	Chris Innes	36	1	30	1	0	0	3	0	3	0
	DF	(England) ENG	Jason Talbot	33	1	28	1	1	0	2	0	2	0
	DF	(Northern Ireland) NIR	Danny Griffin	17	0	17	0	0	0	0	0	0	0
	DF	(Scotland) SCO	Dave Mackay	33	3	28	3	1	0	2	0	2	0
	DF	(Scotland) SCO	James McPake	23	2	18	2	1	0	2	0	2	0
	DF	(Scotland) SCO	Gary Miller	29	0	23	0	1	0	3	0	2	0
	DF	(Scotland) SCO	Phil Cave	5	0	3	0	0	0	1	0	1	0
	MF	(Scotland) SCO	Andy Halliday	13	1	13	1	0	0	0	0	0	0
	MF	(Scotland) SCO	David Sinclair	2	0	1	0	0	0	1	0	0	0
	MF	(Scotland) SCO	Anthony McParland	42	4	36	3	1	0	2	0	3	1
	MF	(Scotland) SCO	Liam Fox	27	2	20	0	1	1	3	1	3	0
	MF	(South Africa) RSA	Keaghan Jacobs	18	0	14	0	1	0	1	0	2	0
	MF	(South Africa) RSA	Kyle Jacobs	1	0	1	0	0	0	0	0	0	0
	MF	(South Africa) RSA	Devon Jacobs	1	0	1	0	0	0	0	0	0	0
	MF	(Scotland) SCO	Chris Malone	8	0	8	0	0	0	0	0	0	0
	MF	(Scotland) SCO	Joe Hamill	38	2	32	1	1	0	3	0	2	1
	MF	(Scotland) SCO	Mark Torrance	4	0	4	0	0	0	0	0	0	0
	MF	(Scotland) SCO	Rocco Quinn	19	1	15	1	0	0	2	0	2	0
	MF	(Scotland) SCO	Murray Davidson	35	6	29	6	0	0	3	0	3	0
	MF	(France) FRA	Milan Thomas	2	0	1	0	1	0	0	0	0	0
	FW	(France) FRA	Armand One	14	3	14	3	0	0	0	0	0	0
	FW	(Scotland) SCO	David Winters	14	3	14	3	0	0	0	0	0	0
	FW	(Italy) ITA	Raffaele De Vita	7	1	7	1	0	0	0	0	0	0
	FW	(Argentina) ARG	Fernando Giarrizo	6	0	4	0	0	0	1	0	1	0
	FW	(Scotland) SCO	Calum Elliot	14	11	13	11	0	0	1	0	0	0
	FW	(Scotland) SCO	Leigh Griffiths	30	22	26	18	0	0	2	1	2	3
	FW	(Scotland) SCO	Gordon Smith	8	1	3	0	1	0	2	1	2	0
			Trialist	2	0	2	0	0	0	0	0	0	0

=== League table ===
Pos	Team	Pld	W	D	L	GF	GA	GD	Pts	Promotion, qualification or relegation
5	Queen of the South	36	12	11	13	57	50	+7	47	
6	Greenock Morton	36	12	11	13	40	40	0	47	
7	Livingston (R)	36	13	8	15	56	58	−2	47 (Note: Demoted to 3rd Division for Financial Irregularities)	Relegation to the Third Division
8	Ross County	36	13	8	15	42	46	−4	47	
9	Airdrie United	36	10	12	14	29	43	−14	42 (Note: Spared Relegation as Losing Finalist in the playoff due to Livingston)	Qualification for the First Division Play-offs (Note: The 9th placed team will be entered into a play-off with the Second Division's 2nd, 3rd and 4th placed teams. The winning team will be awarded a place in the 2009–10 First Division.)

Source: BBC Sport
Rules for classification: 1) points; 2) goal difference; 3) number of goals scored.
(R) Relegated
