= 2009–10 Livingston F.C. season =

Livingston
2009–10 season
- Manager: Gary Bollan
- Stadium: Almondvale Stadium
- Scottish Third Division: Winners
- Challenge Cup: First round
- League Cup: First round
- Scottish Cup: Second round
- Top goalscorer: League: Andy Halliday (12); All: Andy Halliday (14)

The 2009–10 season was Livingston's first season back in the Third Division. They also competed in the Challenge Cup, League Cup and the Scottish Cup.

== Overview ==
Livingston went into administration on 24 July 2009 as the club was unable to pay bills of £330,000 in rent. The club had previously went into administration in 2004. Despite a takeover, the First Division club were deemed to be in breach of SFL rules and were relegated to the Scottish Third Division. The club appealed the decision which led to refusal to play their new third division fixtures whilst it was heard. The appeal to the SFL upheld the original decision. On 7 September 2009 a further appeal to the SFA was dismissed. Livingston won the Third Division by 15 points over nearest team Forfar Athletic. Chairman Gordon McDougall apologised to the other clubs in the division saying that "It wasn’t our choice to have players on First Division wages in the Third Division and it was distinctly unfair that a full-time club was thrust upon the others clubs in the division".

== Results & fixtures ==
Win Draw Loss

=== Friendlies ===
22 July 2010 Friendly	Livingston	2–1	Plymouth Argyle	Creamery Park
19:30	Timár 25' (o.g.); McParland 49'	Liv Report	Summerfield 81' (pen.)

=== Third Division ===
15 August 2009	Livingston	2–0	Montrose	Almondvale Stadium
15:00	Halliday 18', 54'	BBC Report	Crighton (red card) 35'	Attendance: 632; Referee: Hilland

22 August 2009	Berwick Rangers	1–0	Livingston	Shielfield Park
15:00	Brazil 67'	BBC Report		Attendance: 608; Referee: Beaton

29 August 2009	Albion Rovers	1–0	Livingston	Cliftonhill
15:00	Moyes 27' (o.g.)	SFL Report		Attendance: 485

12 September 2009	Livingston	3–2	Elgin City	Almondvale Stadium
15:00	De Vita 26'; Fox 59', 89' (pen.)	BBC Report	Crooks 73'; MacAulay 82'; Dempsie (yellow card) 90' (red card)	Attendance: 757; Referee: Finnie

18 September 2009	Stranraer	0–3	Livingston	Stair Park
15:00		SFL Report	Halliday 3'; De Vita 13', 33'	Attendance: 378; Referee: Boyle

26 September 2009	Livingston	2–1	Queen's Park	Almondvale Stadium
15:00	Fox 43'; R. Winters 55'; Macdonald (red card) 83'	SFL Report	Douglas 36'	Attendance: 961; Referee: Salmond

30 September 2009	East Stirlingshire	3–1	Livingston	Ochilview Park
19:30	Maguire 18', 27'; Lynch 82'	SFL Report	R. Winters 44'	Attendance: 567; Referee: Clancy

10 October 2009	Forfar Athletic	0–1	Livingston	Station Park
15:00		SFL Report	R. Winters 13'	Attendance: 613; Referee: Colvin

13 October 2009	Livingston	2–0	Annan Athletic	Almondvale Stadium
19:30	D. Winters 18'; R. Winters 43'	SFL Report		Attendance: 771; Referee: Watters

17 October 2009	Livingston	1–1	Berwick Rangers	Almondvale Stadium
15:00	Griffin 88'	SFL Report	Cameron MacDonald 71' (o.g.)	Attendance: 815; Referee: Clancy

31 October 2009	Montrose	0–3	Livingston	Links Park
15:00	Anderson (red card) 35'	SFL Report	Brown (red card) 25'; De Vita 53'; Halliday 80'; Mcnulty 90'	Attendance: 433; Referee: Madden

7 November 2009	Elgin City	1–6	Livingston	Borough Briggs
15:00	Gunn 73'	SFL Report	Jacobs 2', 44'; D. Winters 39'; Nicolson 49' (o.g.); Halliday 52'; Talbot 68'	Attendance: 615; Referee: Tumilty

21 November 2009	Queen's Park	1–2	Livingston	Hampden Park
15:00	Quinn 62'	SFL Report	Jacobs 47'; Moyes 65'	Attendance: 620; Referee: Beaton

24 November 2009	Livingston	2–0	Albion Rovers	Almondvale Stadium
19:30	Talbot 5'; Jacobs 85'	SFL Report		Attendance: 726; Referee: McDermott

5 December 2009	Livingston	3–0	Stranraer	Almondvale Stadium
15:00	R. Winters 14'; Glen Mitchell 35' (o.g.); Halliday 69'	SFL Report		Attendance: 1,267; Referee: Finnie

12 December 2009	Livingston	1–2	Forfar Athletic	Almondvale Stadium
15:00	Halliday 22'	SFL Report	Gibson 2'; Tulloch 90'	Referee: Brines

23 January 2010	Stranraer	1–1	Livingston	Stair Park
15:00	Nicoll 12'	SFL Report	Fox 94'	Attendance: 323; Referee: Robertson

26 January 2010	Livingston	1–0	Elgin City	Almondvale Stadium
19:45	Brown 72'	SFL Report		Attendance: 503; Referee: Colvin

2 February 2010	Livingston	2–0	Queen's Park	Almondvale Stadium
19:45	Fox 7'; Halliday 12'	SFL Report		Attendance: 680; Referee: Muir

6 February 2010	Forfar Athletic	2–2	Livingston	Station Park
15:00	Campbell 63'; Tulloch 95'; Fotheringham (yellow card) 90' (red card)	SFL Report	R. Winters 55'; Hamilton 61'	Attendance: 510; Referee: Law

9 February 2010	Albion Rovers	0–2	Livingston	Cliftonhill
19:45	.McGrath (red card) 65'	SFL Report	Hamilton 66' (pen.); Tosh 91'	Attendance: 587; Referee: Beaton

13 February 2010	Livingston	3–2	Annan Athletic	Almondvale Stadium
15:00	De Vita 53'; R. Winters 74'; Halliday 78'	SFL Report	Neilson 17'; Cox 45'	Attendance: 1,085; Referee: Mclean

20 February 2010	East Stirlingshire	0–2	Livingston	Ochilview Park
19:45	Bolochoweckyi (yellow card) 56' (red card)	SFL Report	Halliday 14'; R. Winters 64'	Attendance: 1.062; Referee: Beaton

9 March 2010	Livingston	2–0	East Stirlingshire	Almondvale Stadium
19:45	Halliday 34'; R. Winters 52'	SFL Report		Attendance: 864; Referee: Madded

13 March 2010	Elgin City	0–1	Livingston	Borough Briggs
15:00		SFL Report	De Vita 42'	Attendance: 433; Referee: Somers

16 March 2010	Annan Athletic	0–0	Livingston	Galabank
19:30		SFL Report		Attendance: 604; Referee: Muir

20 March 2010	Livingston	2–1	Stranraer	Almondvale Stadium
15:00	Liam Fox 27'; R. Winters 29'	SFL Report	Moore 86'	Attendance: 1,136; Referee: Brown

27 March 2010	Queen's Park	0–1	Livingston	Hampden Park
15.00		SFL Report	De Vita 80'	Attendance: 714; Referee: McKendrick

3 April 2010	Annan Athletic	2–0	Livingston	Galabank Stadium
15:00	Bell 4'; Storey 82'; Macdonald (yellow card) 68' (red card)	SFL Report		Attendance: 831; Referee: Law

6 April 2010	Livingston	1–0	Montrose	Almondvale Stadium
19:45	Halliday 93'	SFL Report		Attendance: 748; Referee: Hilland

10 April 2010	Livingston	2–3	Forfar Athletic	Almondvale Stadium
15:00	De Vita 1'; R. Winters 33'	SFL Report	Harty 13', 21'; Campbell 17'	Attendance: 1,500; Referee: MacDonald

13 April 2010	Berwick Rangers	1–1	Livingston	Shielfield Park
19:45	Gray 76'	SFL Report	Tosh 71' (pen.)	Attendance: 604; Referee: Finnie

17 April 2010	Livingston	0–0	Berwick Rangers	Almondvale Stadium
15:00		SFL Report		Attendance: 1,621; Referee: Law

24 April 2010	Montrose	0–5	Livingston	Links Park
15:00		SFL Report	Halliday 40', 53'; De Vita 50'; Watson 70'; Jacobs 83'	Attendance: 510; Referee: Muir

27 April 2010	Livingston	2–0	Albion Rovers	Almondvale Stadium
19:45	Sinclair 15'; McGowan 18' (o.g.)	SFL Report		Attendance: 628; Referee: Murray

1 May 2010	Livingston	1–0	East Stirlingshire	Almondvale Stadium
15:00	Jacobs 44'	SFL Report		Attendance: 1,480; Referee: Colvin

=== Challenge Cup ===
25 July 2009 First round	Queen of the South	1–0	Livingston	Palmerston Park
	Wilson 9'	BBC Report		Attendance: 1,558; Referee: Innes

=== League Cup ===
1 August 2009 First round	Albion Rovers	3–0	Livingston	Cliftonhill
	McKenzie 9' (o.g.); Barr 48'; McCusker 89'	BBC Report		Attendance: 602; Referee: Hilland

=== Scottish Cup ===
24 October 2009 Second round	Queen's Park	1–3	Livingston	Hampden Park
15:00	Quinn 78'	BBC Report	De Vita 32', 83'; Fox 62' (pen.)	Attendance: 678; Referee: McLean

9 December 2009 Third round	Clyde	1–1	Livingston	Broadwood Stadium
19:45	Lithgow 63'	BBC Report	Hamill 48'	Attendance: 538; Referee: Charleston

14 December 2009 Third round replay	Livingston	7–1	Clyde	Almondvale Stadium
19:45	Jacobs 5'; Fox 49', 80'; Winters 50', 67'; Halliday 51', 65'	BBC Report	Lithgow 11'	Attendance: 690; Referee: Charleston

20 January 2010 Fourth round	Livingston	0–1	Dundee	Almondvale Stadium
19:45		BBC Report	Harkins 33'	Attendance: 1,176; Referee: Collum

== Statistics ==
=== Squad ===
No.	Pos	Nat	Player	Total		Third Division		Scottish Cup		League Cup		Challenge Cup	
No.	Pos	Nat	Player	Apps	Goals	Apps	Goals	Apps	Goals	Apps	Goals	Apps	Goals
	GK	(Scotland) SCO	Darren Jamieson	1	0	1	0	0	0	0	0	0	0
	GK	(Scotland) SCO	Roddy McKenzie	38	0	32	0	4	0	1	0	1	0
	GK	(Scotland) SCO	Craig McDowall	3	0	2	0	1	0	0	0	0	0
	DF	(Scotland) SCO	Cameron MacDonald	31	0	26	0	4	0	0	0	1	0
	DF	(Scotland) SCO	Chris Innes	1	0	0	0	0	0	0	0	1	0
	DF	(Scotland) SCO	Neil Hastings	2	0	1	0	0	0	1	0	0	0
	DF	(England) ENG	Jason Talbot	38	2	32	2	4	0	1	0	1	0
	DF	(Scotland) SCO	Paul Watson	29	1	25	1	3	0	0	0	1	0
	DF	(Scotland) SCO	Jonathan Brown	19	1	16	1	3	0	0	0	0	0
	DF	(Scotland) SCO	Ewan Moyes	7	1	6	1	1	0	0	0	0	0
	DF	(Northern Ireland) NIR	Danny Griffin	27	1	25	1	2	0	0	0	0	0
	MF	(Scotland) SCO	Andy Halliday	37	14	31	12	4	2	1	0	1	0
	MF	(Scotland) SCO	David Sinclair	35	1	30	1	3	0	1	0	1	0
	MF	(Scotland) SCO	Anthony McParland	6	0	4	0	0	0	1	0	1	0
	MF	(Scotland) SCO	Liam Fox	37	9	31	6	4	3	1	0	1	0
	MF	(South Africa) RSA	Keaghan Jacobs	40	7	34	6	4	1	1	0	1	0
	MF	(South Africa) RSA	Kyle Jacobs	17	0	14	0	3	0	0	0	0	0
	MF	(South Africa) RSA	Sheldon Jacobs	1	0	1	0	0	0	0	0	0	0
	MF	(South Africa) RSA	Devon Jacobs	5	0	5	0	0	0	0	0	0	0
	MF	(Scotland) SCO	Chris Malone	11	0	9	0	0	0	1	0	1	0
	MF	(Scotland) SCO	Joe Hamill	13	1	8	0	3	1	1	0	1	0
	MF	(Scotland) SCO	Bobby Barr	20	0	20	0	0	0	0	0	0	0
	MF	(Scotland) SCO	Mark Torrance	2	0	0	0	0	0	1	0	1	0
	MF	(Scotland) SCO	Joe McKee	2	0	1	0	0	0	1	0	0	0
	MF	(Scotland) SCO	Stephen Husband	8	0	7	0	1	0	0	0	0	0
	MF	(Scotland) SCO	Steve Tosh	15	2	15	2	0	0	0	0	0	0
	FW	(Scotland) SCO	Marc McNulty	9	1	9	1	0	0	0	0	0	0
	FW	(France) FRA	Armand One	3	0	2	0	0	0	0	0	1	0
	FW	(Scotland) SCO	Robbie Winters	40	13	34	11	4	2	1	0	1	0
	FW	(Scotland) SCO	David Winters	18	2	15	2	3	0	0	0	0	0
	FW	(Italy) ITA	Raffaele De Vita	32	11	28	9	4	2	0	0	0	0
	FW	(Scotland) SCO	Jim Hamilton	11	2	11	2	0	0	0	0	0	0
			Trialists	2	0	2	0	0	0	0	0	0	0

=== Disciplinary record ===
Includes all competitive matches.

Nation	Position	Name	Third Division		Scottish Cup		League Cup		Ramsden's Cup		Total	
Nation	Position	Name	Booked	Sent off (straight red)	Booked	Sent off (straight red)	Booked	Sent off (straight red)	Booked	Sent off (straight red)	Booked	Sent off (straight red)
(Scotland)	GK	Darren Jamieson	0	0	0	0	0	0	0	0	0	0
(Scotland)	GK	Roddy McKenzie	0	0	0	0	0	0	0	0	0	0
(Scotland)	GK	Craig McDowall	0	0	0	0	0	0	0	0	0	0
(Scotland)	DF	Cameron MacDonald	3	2	2	0	0	0	0	0	5	2
(Scotland)	DF	Chris Innes	0	0	0	0	0	0	1	0	1	0
(Scotland)	DF	Neil Hastings	0	0	0	0	0	0	0	0	0	0
(England)	DF	Jason Talbot	5	0	1	0	0	0	0	0	6	0
(Scotland)	DF	Paul Watson	2	0	0	0	0	0	0	0	2	0
(Scotland)	DF	Jonathan Brown	5	1	1	0	0	0	0	0	6	1
(Scotland)	DF	Ewan Moyes	2	0	1	1	0	0	0	0	3	1
(Northern Ireland)	DF	Danny Griffin	1	0	0	0	0	0	0	0	1	0
(Scotland)	MF	Andy Halliday	2	0	0	0	0	0	0	0	2	0
(Scotland)	MF	David Sinclair	1	0	0	0	0	0	0	0	1	0
(Scotland)	MF	Anthony McParland	0	0	0	0	0	0	0	0	0	0
(Scotland)	MF	Liam Fox	5	0	0	0	0	0	0	0	5	0
(South Africa)	MF	Keaghan Jacobs	3	0	0	0	0	0	0	0	3	0
(South Africa)	MF	Kyle Jacobs	0	0	0	0	0	0	0	0	0	0
(South Africa)	MF	Sheldon Jacobs	0	0	0	0	0	0	0	0	0	0
(South Africa)	MF	Devon Jacobs	0	0	0	0	0	0	0	0	0	0
(Scotland)	MF	Chris Malone	1	0	0	0	0	0	0	0	1	0
(Scotland)	MF	Joe Hamill	2	0	0	0	1	0	0	0	3	0
(Scotland)	MF	Bobby Barr	0	0	0	0	0	0	0	0	0	0
(Scotland)	MF	Mark Torrance	0	0	0	0	0	0	0	0	0	0
(Scotland)	MF	Joe McKee	0	0	0	0	0	0	0	0	0	0
(Scotland)	MF	Steve Tosh	1	0	0	0	0	0	0	0	1	0
(Scotland)	FW	Marc McNulty	1	0	0	0	0	0	0	0	1	0
(France)	FW	Armand One	1	0	0	0	0	0	0	0	1	0
(Scotland)	FW	Robbie Winters	2	0	0	0	0	0	0	0	2	0
(Italy)	FW	Raffaele De Vita	5	0	0	0	0	0	0	0	5	0
(Scotland)	FW	Jim Hamilton	1	0	0	0	0	0	0	0	1	0

=== League table ===
Pos	Team	Pld	W	D	L	GF	GA	GD	Pts	Promotion or qualification
1	Livingston (C, P)	36	24	6	6	63	25	+38	78	Promotion to the Second Division
2	Forfar Athletic (P, O)	36	18	9	9	59	44	+15	63	Qualification for the Second Division Play-offs (Note: The 2nd, 3rd and 4th placed teams will be entered into a play-off with the Second Division's 9th placed team. The winning team will be awarded a place in the 2010–11 Second Division.)
3	East Stirlingshire	36	19	4	13	50	46	+4	61	Qualification for the Second Division Play-offs
4	Queen's Park	36	15	6	15	42	42	0	51	Qualification for the Second Division Play-offs
5	Albion Rovers	36	13	11	12	35	35	0	50	

Source: Scottish Football League
Rules for classification: 1) points; 2) goal difference; 3) number of goals scored.
(C) Champions; (O) Play-off winners; (P) Promoted
