= Östersunds FK =

Association football club in Östersund, Sweden

- Full name: Östersunds Fotbollsklubb
- Short name: ÖFK
- Founded: 31 October 1996; 30 years ago
- Ground: Jämtkraft Arena, Östersund
- Capacity: 8,545
- Chairman: Peja Lindholm
- Head coach: Nemanja Miljanović
- League: Superettan
- 2025: Superettan, 12th of 16
- Website: ostersundsfk.se
| Home colours | Away colours |

Östersunds Fotbollsklubb, commonly known simply as Östersunds FK, Östersund (Swedish pronunciation: [œstɛˈʂɵnːd]) or (especially locally) ÖFK, is a Swedish professional football club located in Östersund, Sweden, that plays in the Swedish second tier, Superettan. The club was formed in 1996 as a merger of several Östersund clubs. The club is affiliated with the Jämtland-Härjedalens Fotbollförbund and play their home games at Jämtkraft Arena. The club colours, reflected in their crest and kit, are red and black, predominantly in stripes and with red shorts and socks.

From its creation, the club played mostly in the third tier of Swedish football but in 2013 Östersund achieved promotion to the second tier, Superettan, after achieving two consecutive promotions. In 2016, Östersund was promoted to the Swedish first tier, Allsvenskan, for the first time. In 2017, Östersund won the Svenska Cupen and qualified for the UEFA Europa League. The club was relegated to Superettan in 2021.

== Name ==
The name 'Östersunds' is in a possessive clause in the Swedish language, which means it is incorrect to call the club anything other than Östersund in a short form based on the town name.

== Background ==
Östersunds FK was created in 1996 when the three local clubs Ope IF, IFK Östersund and Östersund/Torvalla FF merged, aiming to create a club in that would be able to establish itself in the top two tiers of Swedish football. The next year Frösö IF also joined the project. The newly formed club started out their existence in the third tier in 1997 and Östersund/Torvalla FF ceased to exist as a consequence. IFK Östersund, Ope IF och Östersund/Torvalla FF (ÖTFF). In 2000 a fifth club, Fältjägarnas IF, was also merged into the club.

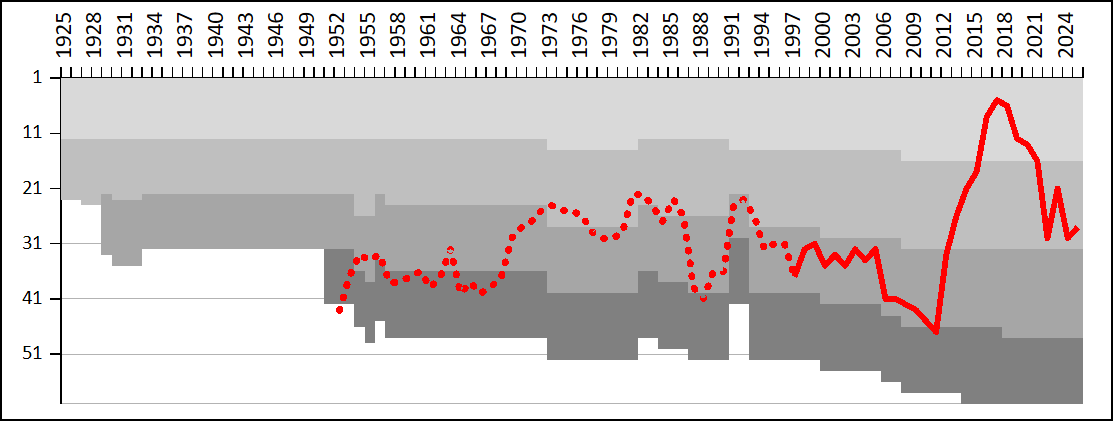
A chart showing the progress of Östersunds FK through the swedish football league system. The different shades of gray represent league divisions and the dotted line represent Ope IF whose spot was taken over by Östersund.

During the 2000s the club started taking on an English flavour and in 2007 the director of football Daniel Kindberg used his friendship with coaches Roberto Martínez and Graeme Jones to start a cooperation with Swansea City where Östersund would loan young players from the club. Swansea also came over to Östersund to play the inauguration game at the newly built stadium. After a poor 2010 season the club was relegated to the fourth tier for the first time ever.

In 2011 Daniel Kindberg returned to the role as director of football and increased financial backing from local companies which enabled the hiring of more full-time staff. Following Jones' recommendation the club also brought in young English manager Graham Potter who was working at an English university at the time. Through several successful signings, some coming from Potter's connections at Nike Football Academy, the club was able to win both the fourth tier and then the third tier immediately the year after. The club was promoted to Superettan for the 2013 season and finished 10th that season.

In January 2014 the club announced that they had signed a half-billion kronor deal with the government of Libya to develop and educate Libyan football players. Under the terms of the deal, Östersunds FK would train 250 young men from Libya every year, except the first year in which they will receive 60 students. Those players would be taught English and computer skills in addition to sports theory and football training. The deal was expected to raise Östersund FKs yearly profits by over 50%. The deal with the Libyan state never came to life, thus meaning no students came to Östersund and no money was received by the club.

On 27 October 2015, the club was promoted to Allsvenskan for the first time. In 2017, they managed to win their first major trophy, Svenska Cupen, after defeating IFK Norrköping 4–1 in the final, also qualifying for the 2017–18 UEFA Europa League, marking their first appearance in a European competition tournament. In their Europa League debut in the second qualifying round on 13 July 2017, Östersund earned a shock 2–0 over Turkish giants Galatasaray at the Jämtkraft Arena and eliminated them after a 1–1 draw in Istanbul. Two goals by Saman Ghoddos in a win over PAOK on 24 August saw them qualify for the group stage at the first time of asking, at the same time making them the only Swedish representative in the season's UEFA competition and making Graham Potter the only British manager in the Europa League group stage. After losing only one game in their campaign, they finished second in a group featuring Athletic Bilbao and Hertha Berlin, becoming the first Swedish club to progress beyond the Europa League group stage. In the round of 32 they managed to beat English side Arsenal 2–1 away but were eliminated 4–2 on aggregate after losing the first leg 3–0.

On 17 April 2018, club chairman (also the director of football) Daniel Kindberg was taken into custody by the Swedish Economic Crime Authority, suspected on probable cause of serious fraud and for assisting in serious gross accounting violations. Together with two other people, Kindberg is suspected of submitting false invoices in several companies, according to the prosecutor. Several of these companies have strong ties to Östersunds FK and the club's sponsorship deals. Several years before, in 2014, Kindberg was subject to criticism when Östersundshem, the municipal housing company where he was the CEO, became a big sponsor of Östersunds FK.

On 11 June 2018, Graham Potter left Östersunds FK to take over as manager of Swansea City after eight seasons in charge.

On 31 October 2021, they were relegated from Allsvenskan after their loss to Varberg BoIS. In the 2022 season, Östersunds FK managed to barely escape relegation from Superettan, the second tier of Swedish men's professional football. The team ended up in 14th place and therefore had to qualify which they did. Östersund played six seasons in Allsvenskan before they were relegated.

== Season to season ==
| Season | Level | Division | Section | Position | Movements | Svenska Cupen |
|---|---|---|---|---|---|---|
| 1997 | Tier 3 | Division 2 | Norrland | 7th | | |
| 1998 | Tier 3 | Division 2 | Norrland | 2nd | Promotion Playoff – Not promoted | |
| 1999 | Tier 3 | Division 2 | Norrland | 1st | Promotion Playoff – Not promoted | |
| 2000 | Tier 3 | Division 2 | Norrland | 5th | | |
| 2001 | Tier 3 | Division 2 | Norrland | 3rd | | |
| 2002 | Tier 3 | Division 2 | Norrland | 5th | | Round 1 |
| 2003 | Tier 3 | Division 2 | Norrland | 2nd | | DNQ |
| 2004 | Tier 3 | Division 2 | Norrland | 4th | | Round 1 |
| 2005 | Tier 3 | Division 2 | Norrland | 2nd | Promoted | Round 3 |
| 2006 (Note: League restructuring in 2006 resulted in a new division being created at Tier 3 and subsequent divisions dropping a level.) | Tier 3 | Division 1 | Norra | 11th | | Round 2 |
| 2007 | Tier 3 | Division 1 | Norra | 11th | | Round 2 |
| 2008 | Tier 3 | Division 1 | Norra | 10th | | Round 2 |
| 2009 | Tier 3 | Division 1 | Norra | 11th | | Round 2 |
| 2010 | Tier 3 | Division 1 | Norra | 13th | Relegated | Round 3 |
| 2011 | Tier 4 | Division 2 | Norrland | 1st | Promoted | Round 2 |
| 2012 | Tier 3 | Division 1 | Norra | 1st | Promoted | Round 2 (Note: No final was played in 2012, due to the Swedish cup moving to a autumn-spring format, with the 2012–13 final being played in 2013.) |
| 2013 | Tier 2 | Superettan | | 10th | | Round 2 |
| 2014 | Tier 2 | Superettan | | 5th | | Group stage, 3rd |
| 2015 | Tier 2 | Superettan | | 2nd | Promoted | Round 2 |
| 2016 | Tier 1 | Allsvenskan | | 8th | | Group stage, 3rd |
| 2017 | Tier 1 | Allsvenskan | | 5th | | Winner |
| 2018 | Tier 1 | Allsvenskan | | 6th | | Semi-finals |
| 2019 | Tier 1 | Allsvenskan | | 12th | | Group stage, 2nd |
| 2020 | Tier 1 | Allsvenskan | | 13th | | Group stage, 2nd |
| 2021 | Tier 1 | Allsvenskan | | 16th | Relegated | Quarter-finals |
| 2022 | Tier 2 | Superettan | | 14th | Relegation Playoff – Not relegated | Round 2 |
| 2023 | Tier 2 | Superettan | | 5th | | Group stage, 4th |
| 2024 | Tier 2 | Superettan | | 14th | Relegation Playoff – Not relegated | Group stage, 3rd |
| 2025 | Tier 2 | Superettan | | 12th | | Group stage, 2nd |

== European record ==
=== Overall record ===
Accurate as of 23 February 2018

| Competition | Played | Won | Drew | Lost | GF | GA | GD | Win% |
|---|---|---|---|---|---|---|---|---|
| UEFA Europa League | 14 | 8 | 3 | 3 | 19 | 13 | +6 | 57.14 |
| Total | 14 | 8 | 3 | 3 | 19 | 13 | +6 | 57.14 |

=== Matches ===
| Season | Competition | Round | Club | Home | Away | Aggregate |
|---|---|---|---|---|---|---|
| 2017–18 | UEFA Europa League | 2Q | (Turkey) Galatasaray | 2–0 | 1–1 | 3–1 |
| 2017–18 | UEFA Europa League | 3Q | (Luxembourg) Fola Esch | 1–0 | 2–1 | 3–1 |
| 2017–18 | UEFA Europa League | PO | (Greece) PAOK | 2–0 | 1–3 | 3–3 (a) |
| 2017–18 | UEFA Europa League | Group J | (Spain) Athletic Bilbao | 2–2 | 0–1 | 2nd |
| 2017–18 | UEFA Europa League | Group J | (Germany) Hertha BSC | 1–0 | 1–1 | 2nd |
| 2017–18 | UEFA Europa League | Group J | (Ukraine) Zorya Luhansk | 2–0 | 2–0 | 2nd |
| 2017–18 | UEFA Europa League | R32 | (England) Arsenal | 0–3 | 2–1 | 2–4 |

Notes

- 2Q: Second qualifying round
- 3Q: Third qualifying round
- PO: Play-off round
- GS: Group Stage
- R32: Round of 32

== Players ==
=== First-team squad ===
As of 2 September 2026

Note: Flags indicate national team as defined under FIFA eligibility rules; some limited exceptions apply. Players may hold more than one non-FIFA nationality.

| No. | Pos. | Nation | Player |
|---|---|---|---|
| 1 | GK | SWE | Melker Uppenberg |
| 2 | MF | SWE | Elliot Caarls |
| 3 | DF | SWE | Hugo Azzi |
| 4 | DF | SWE | Jonathan Westerberg |
| 5 | DF | SWE | Abodi Qasem |
| 6 | MF | ESP | José Masllorens |
| 7 | FW | SWE | Gustav Odenlind |
| 8 | MF | SWE | Emil Özkan |
| 9 | FW | NOR | Abel Stensrud |
| 10 | MF | SWE | Simon Marklund |
| 12 | GK | SWE | Rasmus Forsell |
| 14 | DF | NGR | Sunday Anyanwu |

| No. | Pos. | Nation | Player |
|---|---|---|---|
| 15 | MF | CMR | Donald Molls |
| 16 | MF | BIH | Amar Begić |
| 17 | MF | ENG | Curtis Edwards |
| 18 | FW | ESP | Mario Palomino Delgado |
| 19 | DF | SWE | Dennis Widgren |
| 21 | MF | BIH | Luka Božičković |
| 22 | FW | SWE | Jabir Abdihakim Ali |
| 27 | MF | SWE | Daniel Miljanović |
| 28 | DF | CIV | Yannick Adjoumani |
| 30 | GK | SWE | Tyree Griffiths |
| 77 | GK | KEN | Arnold Origi |

=== Out on loan ===
Note: Flags indicate national team as defined under FIFA eligibility rules; some limited exceptions apply. Players may hold more than one non-FIFA nationality.

| No. | Pos. | Nation | Player |
|---|---|---|---|
| 11 | FW | ARM | Edgar Navassardian (at FBK Karlstad until 30 November 2026) |
| 20 | MF | NGR | Michael Oluwayemi (at FBK Karlstad until 30 November 2026) |

| No. | Pos. | Nation | Player |
|---|---|---|---|
| 22 | DF | SWE | Arvid Holgén (at IFK Östersund until 30 November 2026) |

=== Notable players ===
This list of notable players includes those who have either been named player of the year at the club, or has become league top goalscorer, or went on to play in Allsvenskan (or for larger clubs abroad).

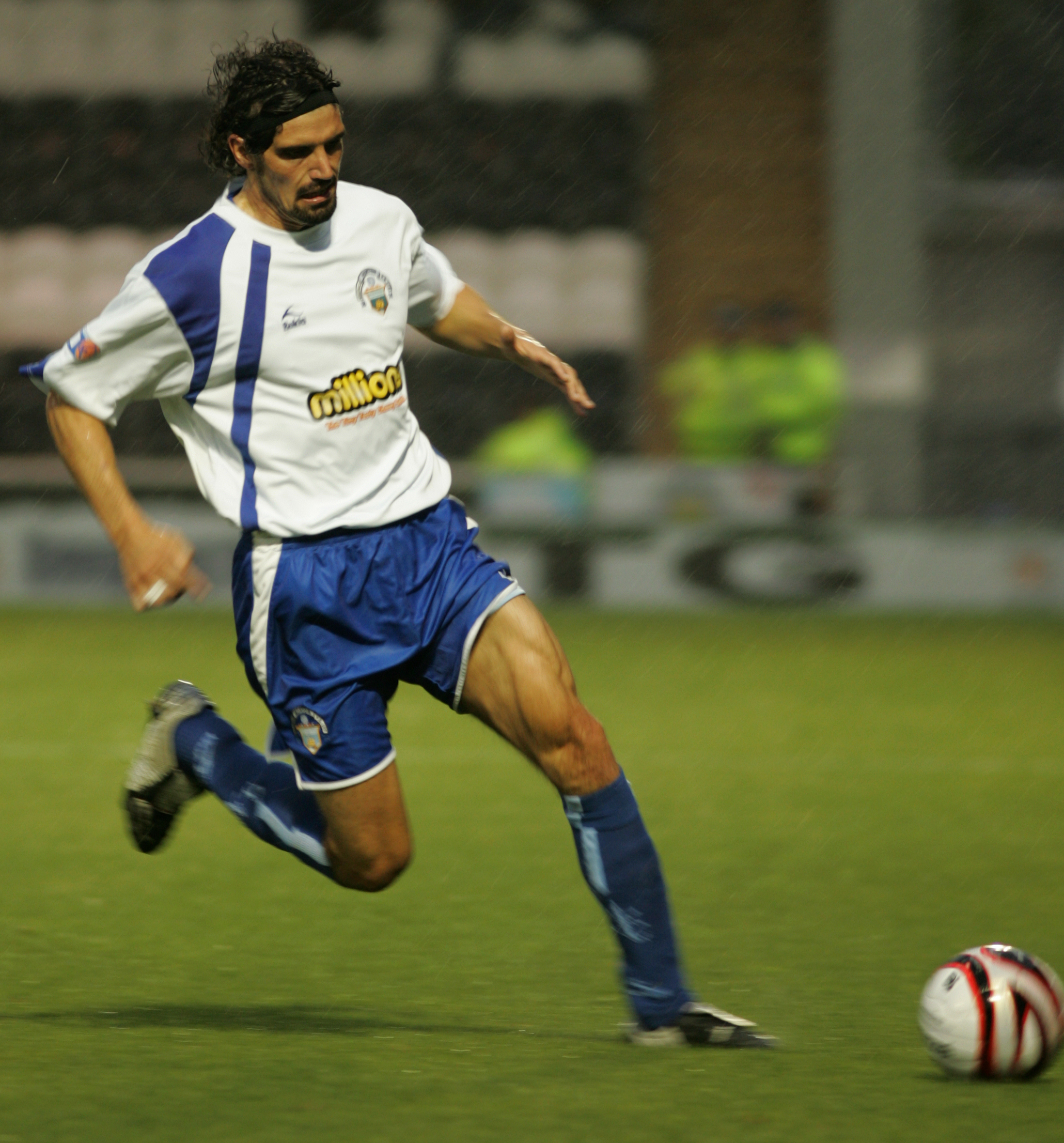
Brian Wake became the combined top goalscorer of all six regional fourth tier leagues in 2011 with 24 goals in 20 games.

- (Sweden) Alan Al-Kadhi
- (Montserrat) Alex Dyer
- (Nigeria) Alhaji Gero
- (Jamaica) Blair Turgott
- (Sweden) Bobo Sollander
- (England) Brian Wake
- (Iraq) Brwa Nouri
- (England) Connor Ripley
- (Sweden) Christoffer Fryklund
- (Northern Ireland) Daryl Smylie
- (Ghana) David Accam
- (Sweden) Dennis Widgren
- (Sweden) Douglas Bergqvist
- (Sweden) Erik Lantto
- (Sweden) Filip Rogić
- (Comoros) Fouad Bachirou
- (Sweden) Fredrik Aliris
- (Syria) Gabriel Somi
- (Syria) Hosam Aiesh
- (England) Jamal Blackman
- (England) Jamie Hopcutt
- (Sweden) Joakim Lundstedt
- (England) Jonathan Routledge
- (Sweden) Ken Sema
- (Sweden) Kjell Jönsson
- (Sweden) Lars Oscarsson
- (Finland) Lasse Mattila
- (England) Lee Makel
- (Sweden) Mattias Eriksson
- (England) Matthew Barnes-Homer
- (Sweden) Martin Johansson
- (Sweden) Mikael Berg
- (The Gambia) Modou Barrow
- (Scotland) Michael Tidser
- (South Korea) Moon Seon-min
- (Scotland) Paul Sheerin
- (Sweden) Peter Amoran
- (Sweden) Petter Augustsson
- (Sweden) Rasmus Lindkvist
- (Jamaica) Ravel Morrison
- (England) Richard Offiong
- (Iran) Saman Ghoddos
- (Ghana) Samuel Mensiro
- (Sweden) Sotirios Papagiannopoulos
- (Sweden) Thomas Isherwood
- (Sweden) Tom Pettersson

== Player records ==
=== Top 10 players with most games in ÖFK ===
| Nr | Name | Games | Goals |
|---|---|---|---|
| 2 | (Guinea) (Sweden) Aly Keita | 244 | 0 |
| 1 | (England) (Sweden) Jamie Hopcutt | 228 | 53 |
| 3 | (Sweden) Lars Oscarsson | 212 | 10 |
| 4 | (Ghana) (Sweden) Samuel Mensiro | 204 | 4 |
| 5 | (Sweden) Martin Johansson | 193 | 15 |
| 6 | (Sweden) Daniel Westerlund | 184 | 58 |
| 7 | (Sweden) Dennis Widgren | 179 | 3 |
| 8 | (Sweden) Petter Jacobsson | 172 | 7 |
| 9 | (Sweden) Bobo Sollander | 163 | 24 |
| 10 | (Iraq) (Sweden) Brwa Nouri | 154 | 23 |

=== Player of the season in ÖFK ===
| Year | Name |
|---|---|
| 1997 | (Scotland) Paul Sheerin |
| 1998 | (Sweden) Mattias Eriksson |
| 1999 | (Sweden) Mikael Berg |
| 2000 | (Sweden) Lars Oscarsson |
| 2001 | (Finland) (Sweden) Lasse Mattila |
| 2002 | (Sweden) Kjell Jönsson |
| 2003 | (Sweden) Fredrik Aliris |
| 2004 | (Sweden) Martin Johansson |
| 2005 | (Sweden) Joakim Lundstedt |
| 2006 | (Sweden) Erik Lantto |
| 2007 | (Sweden) Erik Lantto |
| 2008 | (England) Lee Makel |
| 2009 | (Sweden) Bobo Sollander |
| 2010 | (Sweden) Christoffer Fryklund |
| 2011 | (England) (Sweden) Brian Wake |
| 2012 | (Sweden) Petter Augustsson |
| 2013 | (Ghana) (Sweden) Samuel Mensiro |
| 2014 | (The Gambia) (Sweden) Modou Barrow |
| 2015 | (Comoros) (France) Fouad Bachirou |
| 2016 | (Sweden) (England) Douglas Bergqvist |
| 2017 | (Iran) (Sweden) Saman Ghoddos |
| 2018 | (Iran) (Sweden) Saman Ghoddos |
| 2019 | (Montenegro) (Sweden) Dino Islamovic |
| 2020 | (Guinea) (Sweden) Aly Keita |
| 2021 | (Guinea) (Sweden) Aly Keita |
| 2022 | (Sweden) Ludvig Fritzson |

== Top 10 players with most goals in ÖFK ==
| Nr | Name | Goals | Games |
|---|---|---|---|
| 1 | (Sweden) Daniel Westerlund | 58 | 184 |
| 2 | (England) (Sweden) Jamie Hopcutt | 53 | 228 |
| 3 | (Iran) (Sweden) Saman Ghoddos | 41 | 93 |
| 4 | (Sweden) Joakim Lundstedt | 33 | 97 |
| 5 | (England) (Sweden) Brian Wake | 26 | 33 |
| 6 | (Sweden) Bobo Sollander | 24 | 163 |
| 7 | (Iran) (Sweden) Brwa Nouri | 23 | 154 |
| 8 | (Sweden) Daniel Johansson | 21 | 36 |
| 8 | (Jamaica) (England) Blair Turgott | 21 | 68 |
| 10 | (Montserrat) (England) Alex Dyer | 19 | 93 |

== Management and boardroom ==
=== Technical staff ===
As of 24 January 2021

| Name | Role |
|---|---|
| (Sweden) Daniel Molander | Chairman |
| (Sweden) Vacant | CEO |
| (Sweden) Stefan Lundin | Sporting Director |
| (Sweden) Tor-Arne Fredheim | Head coach |
| (Norway) Fredrik Åsmund Eliassen | Assistant Coach |
| (Kenya) Arnold Origi | Goalkeeping Coach |
| (Libya) Moubarak Abdallah | Equipment Manager |
| Vacant | Doctor |
| Vacant | Head of Physiotherapists |
| Vacant | Supporter Liaison Officer |

=== Boardroom ===
Östersunds FK (Föreningen)

| Name | Role |
|---|---|
| (Sweden) Richard Persson | Chairman |
| (Sweden) Johan Lidenmark | Boardmember |
| (Sweden) Ulf Ringdahl | Boardmember |
| (Sweden) Åsa Bromée | Boardmember |
| (Sweden) Åsa Trolle | Boardmember |
| (Sweden) Mårten Ulander | Boardmember |

Östersunds FK Elitfotboll AB

| Name | Role |
|---|---|
| (Sweden) Tom Pripp | Chairman |
| (Sweden) Kjell Andersson | CEO |
| (Sweden) Tommy Holmgren | Vice Chairman |
| (Sweden) Kent Hellström | Board member |

== Coaches ==
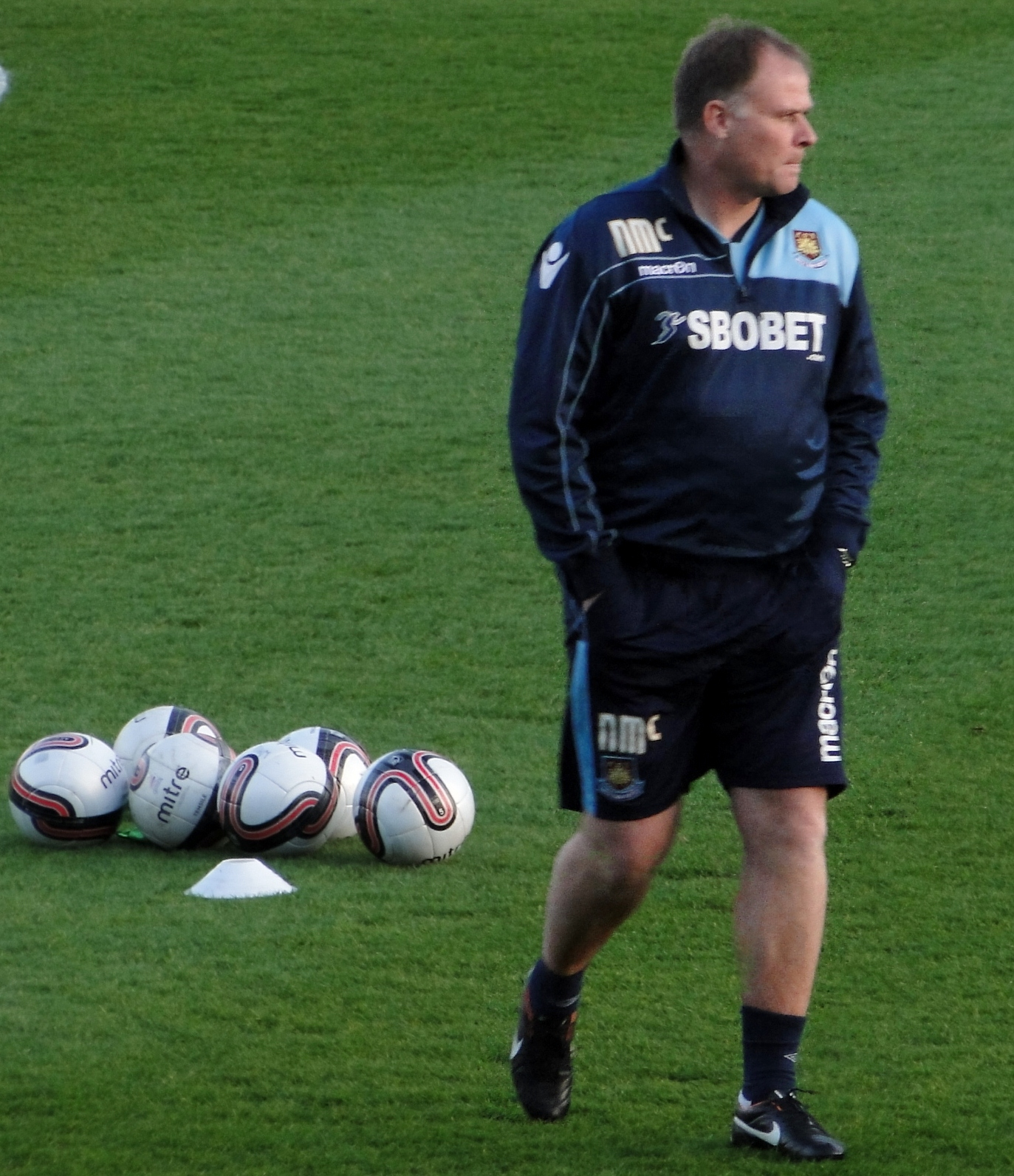
Englishman Neil McDonald helped the team avoid relegation during his short time with the club at the end of the 2007 season.

- (Sweden) Leif Widegren (1997)
- (Sweden) Christer Andersson (1998)
- (Sweden) Sören Åkeby (1999)
- (Sweden) Jan Westerlund (1999–2001)
- (Sweden) Hans Eskilsson (2002–2003)
- (Sweden) Ulf Kvarnlöf (2004–2005)
- (Sweden) Stefan Regebro (2006–2007)
- (England) Neil McDonald (2007)
- (Sweden) Kalle Björklund (2008–2009)
- (England) Lee Makel (2010)
- (England) Graham Potter (2011–2018)
- (England) Ian Burchnall (2018–2020)
- (Sweden) (Iran) Amir Azrafshan (2020–2021)
- (Norway) Per Joar Hansen (2021–2022)
- (Sweden) Magnus Powell (2022–2024)
- (Sweden) Thomas Gabrielsson (2024)
- (Sweden) Kiarash Livani (2025)
- (Sweden) Tor-Arne Fredheim (2025)
- (Sweden) Nemanja Miljanović (2026–)

== Attendances ==
In recent seasons Östersunds FK have had the following average attendances:

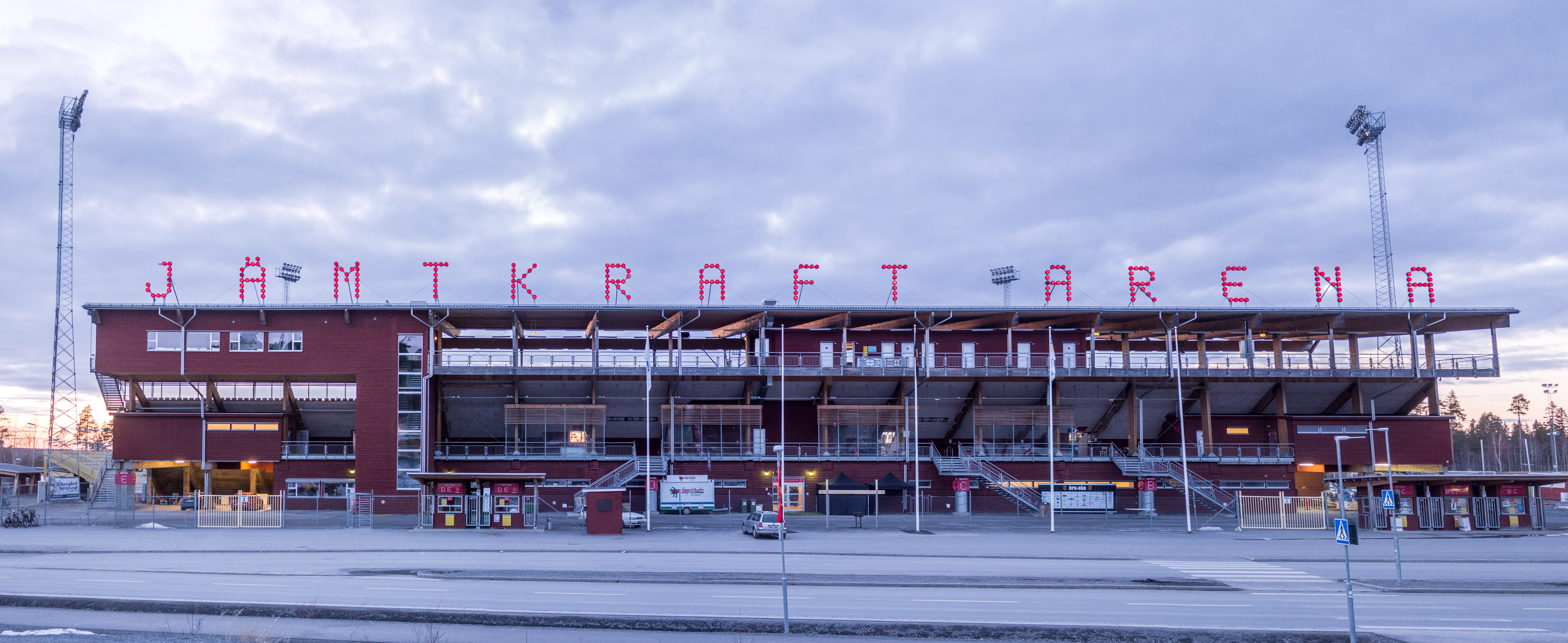
Jämtkraft Arena opened up in 2007 with a friendly game between Östersunds FK and Swansea City.

| Season | Average attendance | Division / Section | Level | Stadium |
|---|---|---|---|---|
| 2005 | 573 | Div 2 Norrland | Tier 3 | Hofvallen |
| 2006 | 535 | Div 1 Norra | Tier 3 | Hofvallen |
| 2007 | 1,060 | Div 1 Norra | Tier 3 | Jämtkraft Arena |
| 2008 | 1,104 | Div 1 Norra | Tier 3 | Jämtkraft Arena |
| 2009 | 1,134 | Div 1 Norra | Tier 3 | Jämtkraft Arena |
| 2010 | 992 | Div 1 Norra | Tier 3 | Jämtkraft Arena |
| 2011 | 783 | Div 2 Norrland | Tier 4 | Jämtkraft Arena |
| 2012 | 1,695 | Div 1 Norra | Tier 3 | Jämtkraft Arena |
| 2013 | 3,320 | Superettan | Tier 2 | Jämtkraft Arena |
| 2014 | 3,022 | Superettan | Tier 2 | Jämtkraft Arena |
| 2015 | 3,857 | Superettan | Tier 2 | Jämtkraft Arena |
| 2016 | 5,914 | Allsvenskan | Tier 1 | Jämtkraft Arena |
| 2017 | 5,265 | Allsvenskan | Tier 1 | Jämtkraft Arena |
| 2018 | 6,020 | Allsvenskan | Tier 1 | Jämtkraft Arena |
| 2019 | 4,808 | Allsvenskan | Tier 1 | Jämtkraft Arena |
| 2020 | (COVID) -- | Allsvenskan | Tier 1 | Jämtkraft Arena |
| 2021 | 1,500 (COVID) | Allsvenskan | Tier 1 | Jämtkraft Arena |
| 2022 | 1,661 | Superettan | Tier 2 | Jämtkraft Arena |

* Attendances are provided in the Publikliga sections of the Svenska Fotbollförbundet website.

== Honours ==
=== League ===
- Superettan (Tier 2)
  - Runners-up (1): 2015
- Division 1 Norra (Tier 3)
  - Winners (1): 2012
- Division 2 Norrland (Tier 3)*
  - Winners (1): 1999
  - Runners-up (3): 1998, 2003, 2005
- Division 2 Norrland (Tier 4)*
  - Winners (1): 2011

=== Cups ===
- Svenska Cupen
  - Winners (1): 2016–17

* League restructuring in 2006 resulted in a new division being created at Tier 3 and subsequent divisions dropping a level.
