= Sollander =

Sollander is a Swedish surname that may refer to

- Lotta Sollander (born 3 July 1953), Swedish alpine skier
- Stig Sollander (25 June 1926–12 December 2019), Swedish alpine skier, father of Lotta
- Bobo Sollander (born 26 June 1985), Swedish footballer, son of Lotta and grandson of Stig
