= Andy Halliday =

Scottish footballer

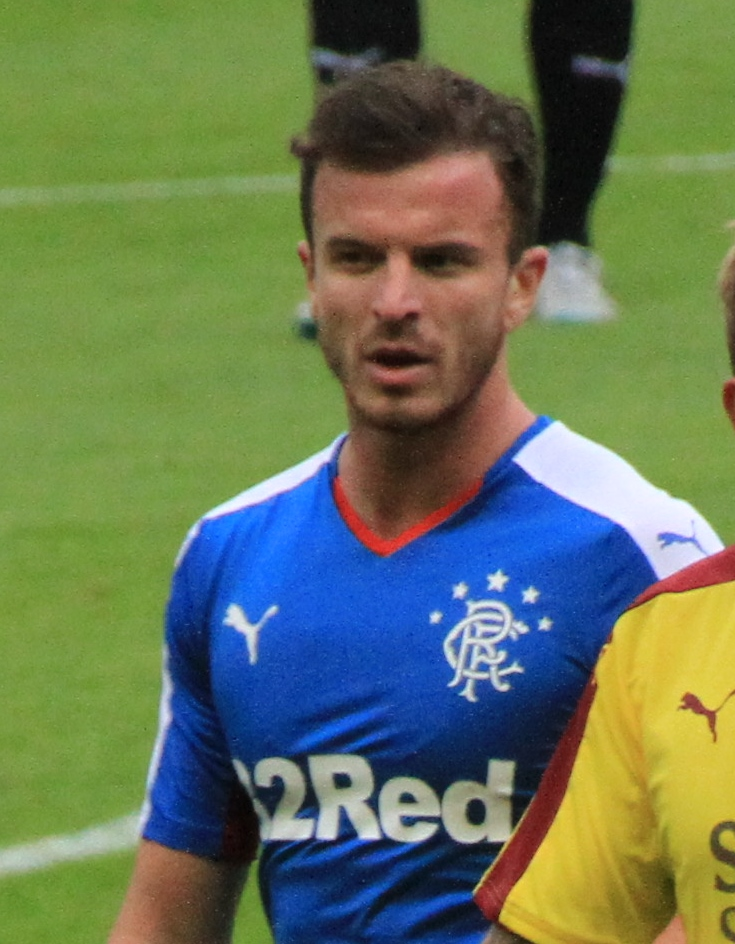
- Halliday playing for Rangers in 2015

Personal information
- Full name: Andrew William Halliday
- Date of birth: 11 October 1991 (age 35)
- Place of birth: Glasgow, Scotland
- Positions: Midfielder; left-back

Youth career
- 2002–2003: Ross County
- 2003–2006: Rangers
- 2006–2008: Livingston

Senior career*
Years	Team	Apps	(Gls)
2008–2010	Livingston	45	(15)
2010–2015	Middlesbrough	36	(1)
2011–2012	→ Walsall (loan)	7	(0)
2014	→ Blackpool (loan)	18	(1)
2014–2015	→ Bradford City (loan)	12	(1)
2015	Bradford City	13	(0)
2015–2020	Rangers	107	(9)
2017–2018	→ Gabala (loan)	3	(0)
2020–2024	Heart of Midlothian	84	(10)
2024	→ Motherwell (loan)	12	(1)
2024–2026	Motherwell	40	(3)
- * Club domestic league appearances and goals as of 28 December 2025

Andrew William Halliday (born 11 October 1991) is a Scottish former professional footballer who played as a midfielder or left-back. He has previously played for Livingston, Middlesbrough, Walsall, Blackpool, Bradford City, Gabala, Rangers, Heart of Midlothian and Motherwell.

In January 2015, he scored Bradford City's third goal against Chelsea in the fourth round of the FA Cup. His club went on to win 4–2, a result regarded as one of the greatest FA Cup shock results in the history of the competition.

In May 2026, Andy Halliday retired from professional football.

== Playing career ==
=== Livingston ===
Halliday was in the youth team that won the SFL under-19 League and Cup double in 2008–09, and the side that retained the league title in 2009–10.

After promising developments at Ross County, Halliday was scouted by Rangers before being released in 2006. He then moved to Livingston, playing for the under-19s before progressing to the first team and making his debut on 26 April 2008, as a substitute in a 5–2 defeat against St Johnstone. In March 2009, Halliday alongside then Livingston teammates Leigh Griffiths and Joe McKee spent five days on trial with Italian Serie B side Parma.

Halliday's performances throughout the 2009–10 season attracted interest from several Scottish and English teams, this came after he bagged 14 goals in just 32 appearances. At the Livingston player of the year awards for the 2009–10 season, Halliday won young player of the year, as well as being nominated twice for goal of the season.

=== Middlesbrough ===
Halliday joined the then Championship side Middlesbrough for the start of the 2010–11 season, after agreeing to join Gordon Strachan's team. He scored his first goal for Middlesbrough in a 3–3 draw with Ipswich Town on 12 April 2011. His second goal came in the FA Cup against Hastings United.

On 25 November 2011, Halliday joined Walsall on loan until January 2012. He returned to Middlesbrough at the end of the loan with Walsall having opted not to extend the move. On 24 January 2014, Halliday signed for Blackpool on loan for the remainder of the 2013–14 season.

=== Bradford City ===
Halliday signed on loan for Bradford City in October 2014. The move became permanent on 22 January 2015. He scored the third goal in Bradford City's memorable 4–2 victory over Chelsea in the 2014–15 FA Cup fourth round. Halliday scored three goals in 32 games for Bradford during the 2014–15 season, but he was released at the end of the season.

=== Rangers ===
On 18 July 2015, Halliday signed a two-year deal to join his boyhood heroes Rangers with the option of a third-year. On 25 July 2015, he scored on his debut in a 6–2 win over Hibernian in the Scottish Challenge Cup. Halliday scored his first league goal for Rangers in a 5–1 win over Queen of the South at Palmerston Park on 30 August, four days after scoring away from home in a Scottish League Cup match at Airdrieonians. He scored his first goal at home in a 4–0 win over Dumbarton at Ibrox on 1 December 2015. On 28 December, Halliday received a straight red card in Rangers' 4–2 win over Hibernian by referee Bobby Madden for violent conduct after clashing with Hibs' midfielder Fraser Fyvie. However, the card was later appealed by Rangers and reduced to a yellow while Fyvie was charged with simulation, receiving a two-match ban.

Halliday started 2016 well by scoring against Dumbarton in a 6–0 win then agreeing a new four-year contract extension until 2020 on 13 January. His scoring form continued with strikes against Raith Rovers, Dundee and Queen Of the South. On 25 January, Halliday was sent off for the second time that season in controversial circumstances during a league match away to Morton: he was alleged to have made an offensive gesture to the home support after Barrie McKay had scored to make it 2–0 to Rangers which led him being shown a second yellow card, and the decision by referee Barry Cook angered both player and Rangers manager Mark Warburton. Halliday later noted the incident was a career low point. In the absence of regular penalty taker Martyn Waghorn, Halliday converted from the spot in the 4–0 win over Peterhead in the 2016 Scottish Challenge Cup Final; he also scored his penalty in the Scottish Cup semi-final shoot-out against Celtic. He scored a "stunning" long-range goal to put Rangers 2–1 ahead in the final against Hibernian, but they would go on to lose 3–2.

The following season, Halliday made his Scottish Premiership debut in August 2016, starting in midfield in a 1–1 draw against Hamilton Academical. He appeared as a half-time substitute for Niko Kranjčar in the Old Firm match against Celtic at Celtic Park on 10 September 2016 which resulted in a 5–1 defeat. A few days following the match, Halliday was involved with a training ground argument with fellow Rangers midfielder Joey Barton, which led to Barton being suspended by Rangers for three weeks. With club captain Lee Wallace absent in the next match against Queen of the South in the League Cup, Halliday was named captain of the side by Warburton. He played the full game, scoring the second goal in a 5–0 win, while Barton had his contract with the club terminated a few months later. Halliday's appearances became less frequent under new manager Pedro Caixinha, and Rangers finished the season in third place behind Aberdeen and Celtic.

==== Gabala (loan) ====
On 28 June 2017, Gabala FK announced the signing of Halliday on a season-long loan deal. He debuted in Gabala's UEFA Europa League Second Qualifying Round match against Jagiellonia Białystok. Gabala announced the termination of Halliday's loan on 4 January 2018. His signing was voted one of the most unsuccessful of 2017 in a local poll, due to the low number of matches he played.

==== Return to Rangers ====
In October 2017, Caixinha was dismissed and replaced by Graeme Murty, who was happy for Halliday to return to Scotland. He was named in the starting line-up in the semi-final of the 2017–18 Scottish Cup against Celtic, but was substituted for Josh Windass before half time with Rangers already two goals behind; Halliday was caught by television cameras shouting to the crowd showing his frustration at the situation. Two weeks later, against the same opposition at Celtic Park, Halliday played the whole match at left back but was exposed several times due to his unfamiliarity with the position as Celtic won 5–0 to confirm the Scottish title. This was to be Murty's last game in charge, and Rangers again finished the season in third place.

Under new manager Steven Gerrard in 2018–19, Halliday's involvement increased as the campaign progressed, playing either at full-back or midfield including seven appearances in the Europa League. In an important league meeting with Celtic at Ibrox on 29 December 2018, he put in a committed performance in a 1–0 Rangers win, with Gerrard praising him as 'my unofficial captain'.

On 19 May 2020 it was announced that he would leave Rangers at the end of May when his contract ended.

=== Heart of Midlothian ===
On 28 September 2020, Heart of Midlothian announced the signing of Halliday on a two-year deal.

=== Motherwell ===
On 19 January 2024, Halliday joined fellow Scottish Premiership club Motherwell on loan until the end of the season, which would turn into a permanent deal in the summer of 2024.

On 30 April 2025, Motherwell announced that they had extended their contract with Halliday for the 2025–26 season.

== Personal life ==
Halliday is a boyhood Rangers fan and owned a season ticket for sixteen years. He travelled to Manchester in 2008, when Rangers played in the UEFA Cup Final against Zenit Saint Petersburg, missing a school exam in the process.

=== Media career ===
Since 2020, Halliday has become a frequent member on Open Goal's YouTube channel, particularly on their podcast "Open Goal" alongside Simon Ferry, Paul Slane and Kevin Kyle. He also regularly appears as a pundit on Clyde 1 Superscoreboard.

== Career statistics ==
As of 4 November 2023 (UTC)

Appearances and goals by club, season and competition
Club	Season	League			National Cup		League Cup		Continental		Other		Total	
Club	Season	Division	Apps	Goals	Apps	Goals	Apps	Goals	Apps	Goals	Apps	Goals	Apps	Goals
Livingston	2007–08	Scottish First Division	1	0	0	0	0	0	—		0	0	1	0
Livingston	2008–09	Scottish First Division	12	1	0	0	0	0	—		0	0	12	1
Livingston	2009–10	Scottish Third Division	32	14	3	2	1	0	—		1 (Note: Appearances in Scottish Challenge Cup)	0	37	16
Livingston	Total		45	15	3	2	1	0	0	0	1	0	50	17
Middlesbrough	2010–11	Championship	12	1	0	0	1	0	—		—		13	1
Middlesbrough	2011–12	Championship	1	0	0	0	0	0	—		—		1	0
Middlesbrough	2012–13	Championship	19	0	2	1	3	0	—		—		24	1
Middlesbrough	2013–14	Championship	4	0	0	0	0	0	—		—		4	0
Middlesbrough	2014–15	Championship	0	0	0	0	0	0	—		—		0	0
Middlesbrough	Total		36	1	2	1	4	0	0	0	0	0	42	2
Walsall (loan)	2011–12	League One	7	0	1	0	0	0	—		0	0	8	0
Blackpool (loan)	2013–14	Championship	18	1	0	0	0	0	—		—		18	1
Bradford City (loan)	2014–15	League One	12	1	3	1	0	0	—		0	0	15	2
Bradford City	2014–15	League One	13	0	4	1	0	0	—		0	0	17	1
Rangers	2015–16	Scottish Championship	35	5	6	2	3	1	—		4	2	48	10
Rangers	2016–17	Scottish Premiership	32	3	3	0	7	2	—		—		42	5
Rangers	2017–18	Scottish Premiership	11	0	4	0	0	0	—		—		15	0
Rangers	2018–19	Scottish Premiership	23	1	3	2	2	0	7 (Note: Appearances in the Europa League)	0	—		35	3
Rangers	2019–20	Scottish Premiership	6	0	2	0	1	0	3	0	—		12	0
Rangers	Total		107	9	18	4	13	3	10	0	4	2	152	18
Gabala (loan)	2017–18	Azerbaijan Premier League	3	0	1	0	—		4	0	—		8	0
Heart of Midlothian
Heart of Midlothian	2020–21	Scottish Championship	26	3	2 (Note: The later stages of the 2019–20 Scottish Cup were played in October and December 2020.)	0	2	0	0	0	0	0	30	3
Heart of Midlothian	2021–22	Scottish Premiership	27	4	5	1	5	1	0	0	0	0	37	6
Heart of Midlothian	2022–23	Scottish Premiership	28	3	1	0	1	0	6	1	0	0	36	4
Heart of Midlothian	2023–24	Scottish Premiership	3	0	0	0	1	0	2	0	0	0	6	0
Heart of Midlothian	Total		84	10	8	1	9	1	8	1	0	0	109	13
Motherwell (loan)	2023–24	Scottish Premiership	0	0	0	0	—		—		—		0	0
Career total			320	37	35	8	24	4	12	1	5	2	408	54

== Honours ==
Livingston Youth

- SFL U-19 League: 2008–09, 2009–10
- SFL U-19 League Cup: 2008–09

Livingston

- Scottish Third Division: 2009–10

Rangers

- Scottish Championship: 2015–16
- Scottish Challenge Cup: 2015–16
- Scottish Cup runner-up: 2015–16

Heart of Midlothian

- Scottish Championship: 2020–21
- Scottish Cup runner-up: 2019–20, 2021–22

Individual

- Scottish Football League Young Player of the Month: December 2009
