= David Winters (footballer) =

Scottish footballer

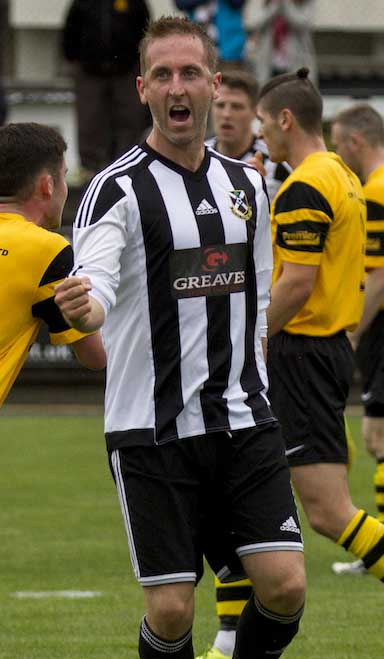
- David Winters in September 2015

Personal information
- Full name: David Winters
- Date of birth: 7 March 1982 (age 44)
- Place of birth: Paisley, Scotland
- Height: 5 ft 11 in (1.80 m)
- Positions: Attacking midfielder; forward; striker

Team information
- Current team: Darvel (manager)

Senior career*
Years	Team	Apps	(Gls)
1999–2003	Dundee United	19	(0)
2001	→ Forfar Athletic (loan)	3	(3)
2003	→ Ross County (loan)	10	(1)
2003–2006	Ross County	97	(24)
2006–2008	Hamilton Academical	45	(8)
2008–2009	Ross County	12	(2)
2009–2010	Livingston	29	(5)
2010	Arbroath	2	(1)
2010	Dumbarton	15	(5)
2010–2011	Can Tho	11	(8)
2011–2012	Dumbarton	12	(1)
2012	Annan Athletic	17	(4)
2012–2013	Ayr United	30	(4)
2013	Queen's Park	1	(0)
2013–2014	Sauchie Juniors	25	(20)
2014–2017	Pollok	127	(83)
2017–2018	Kilwinning Rangers	25	(16)
2018–2019	BSC Glasgow	25	(8)
2019–2021	Caledonian Braves	50	(25)
Total		555	(218)

Managerial career
- 2021–2023: Caledonian Braves (assistant manager)
- 2023–2024: Darvel (assistant manager)
- 2024–: Darvel
- * Club domestic league appearances and goals

David Winters (born 7 March 1982) is a Scottish former footballer and current manager of West of Scotland side Darvel.

Winters played as a striker and has previously played in the Scottish Premier League for Dundee United.

== Playing career ==
Winters, like older brother Robbie, started his career with Dundee United and played in 19 league matches between 1999 and 2003. During this time, he had loan spells with Forfar Athletic and Ross County, and made the permanent move to Victoria Park in 2003.

After three seasons with The Staggies he moved to Hamilton Academical at the start of season 2006–07. Winters spent the following pre-season at Halifax Town after turning down a deal from Hamilton at the end of the season. He even played, and scored, as a trialist for Halifax against Hamilton in a friendly. However, he signed a contract, until the end of the 2007–08 season, for Hamilton in August. Winters was released by Hamilton in January 2008 and rejoined Ross County in February. He joined Livingston in January 2009.

Winters moved to Dumbarton in March 2010, scoring three goals in his first five appearances. Winters left Dumbarton in May 2010 and moved to Vietnam to play for Can Tho F.C. On 5 August 2011 Winters re-signed for Dumbarton on a one-year deal. He left in January 2012 after failing to establish himself in the Sons first eleven. After appearing as a trialist for Annan Athletic, Winters signed a deal until the end of the season, before moving on to Ayr United in the summer.

In August 2013, Winters joined Junior side Sauchie Juniors. In March 2014, Winters joined Pollok. He started his impressive goal tally for the Southside Glasgow Giants with four goals on his debut. His seven goals in the final five games of the season could not prevent Lok from being relegated to the West First Division. In March 2015, Winters signed a contract extending his current contract for another year at Newlandsfield. With ten matches left in the league season, David's brother, Robbie joined Pollok on loan where the front two would spearhead their attack for the final run-in. Pollok were crowned First Division Champions in May 2015 with Winters scoring 34 Goals that season, with two coming in a 3–0 win in the Evening Times Winners' Cup Final against Blantyre Victoria – Robbie scoring the other. Since his 'Lok debut, he has only missed one competitive fixture through injury. He left Pollok in June 2017 following 127 appearances and 83 goals.

After leaving Pollok, Winters joined fellow Super League Premier Division team Kilwinning Rangers. After a season at Abbey Park, Winters moved to BSC Glasgow. In July 2019, he signed for Edusport Academy.

== Coaching career ==
Winters announced his retirement from playing on 13 May 2021 while also announcing his new role as assistant manager of Lowland League side Caledonian Braves.

He was subsequently assistant manager to Tony McInally at West of Scotland League club Darvel. When McInally was sacked in May 2024, Winters took over as manager for the rest of the season, including the 2024 Scottish Junior Cup final.

== Personal life ==
Winters also coaches young people throughout Glasgow in his role with coaching and groupwork company A&M Training. He is married to former Scotland women footballer Suzanne Grant.

== Honours ==
Hamilton Academical

- Scottish First Division: 2007–08

Ross County

- Scottish Second Division: 2007–08

Livingston

- Scottish Third Division: 2009–10

Pollok

- West of Scotland Super League First Division: 2014–15
- Evening Times Cup Winners' Cup: 2014–15
- Central League Cup: 2015–16
- West of Scotland Junior Cup: 2016–17

Kilwinning Rangers

- Ayrshire Junior Cup: 2017–18

BSC Glasgow

- Lowland League Cup: 2018–19
