= Bobo Sollander =

Swedish footballer

Personal information
- Full name: Bobo Karl Nils Sollander Jansson
- Date of birth: 26 June 1985 (age 41)
- Height: 1.90 m (6 ft 3 in)
- Position: Defender

Senior career*
Years	Team	Apps	(Gls)
2005–2006	Frösö IF		
2006–2012	Östersunds FK	111	(21)
2007	→ Frösö IF (loan)	4	(2)
2013–2017	Östersunds FK	53	(3)
Total		168	(26)
- * Club domestic league appearances and goals

Bobo Karl Nils Sollander Jansson (born 26 June 1985), known simply as Bobo Sollander, is a Swedish retired footballer who played as a defender.

He is the grandson of Stig Sollander.

== Career statistics ==
=== Club ===
Club	Season	League			Cup		Continental		Other		Total	
Club	Season	Division	Apps	Goals	Apps	Goals	Apps	Goals	Apps	Goals	Apps	Goals
Östersunds FK	2006	Division 1	23	2	0	0	–		0	0	23	2
Östersunds FK	2007	Division 1	23	2	0	0	–		0	0	23	2
Östersunds FK	2008	Division 1	21	2	0	0	–		0	0	21	2
Östersunds FK	2009	Division 1	24	5	0	0	–		0	0	24	5
Östersunds FK	2010	Division 1	23	6	2 (Note: Appearances in the Svenska Cupen)	0	–		0	0	25	6
Östersunds FK	2011	Division 2	4	3	1	0	–		0	0	5	3
Östersunds FK	2012	Division 1	16	3	2	1	–		0	0	18	4
Östersunds FK	2013	Superettan	8	0	1	0	–		0	0	9	0
Östersunds FK	2014	Superettan	12	0	1	0	–		0	0	13	0
Östersunds FK	2015	Superettan	17	3	0	0	–		0	0	17	3
Östersunds FK	2016	Allsvenskan	5	0	1	0	–		0	0	6	0
Östersunds FK	2017	Allsvenskan	11	0	1	0	1 (Note: Appearances in the UEFA Europa League)	0	0	0	13	0
Östersunds FK	Total		164	24	9	0	1	0	0	0	174	24
Frösö IF (loan)	2007	Division 3	4	2	0	0	–		0	0	4	2
Career total			168	26	9	0	1	0	0	0	178	26
