= Peter Amoran =

Swedish association footballer (born 2004)

Personal information
- Full name: Peter Toluwanimi Amoran
- Date of birth: 22 May 2004 (age 22)
- Place of birth: Abuja, Nigeria
- Height: 1.89 m (6 ft 2 1/2 in)
- Position: Defender

Team information
- Current team: Västerås SK
- Number: 23

Youth career
- –2020: IFK Östersund
- 2020: GIF Sundsvall
- 2022–2024: Parma

Senior career*
Years	Team	Apps	(Gls)
2019	IFK Östersund Ungdom	4	(1)
2020	IFK Östersund	1	(0)
2021	IFK Östersund	17	(0)
2022	Östersunds FK	13	(0)
2024–2026	Parma	0	(0)
2024–2025	→ Perugia (loan)	28	(0)
2025–2026	→ Cesena (loan)	7	(0)
2026–	Västerås SK	2	(0)

International career^{‡}
2021–2024	Sweden U19	19	(0)
2024–2026	Sweden U21	8	(2)
- * Club domestic league appearances and goals as of 19 September 2026 ‡ National team caps and goals as of 17:09, 6 October 2026 (UTC)

Peter Toluwanimi Amoran (born 22 May 2004) is a professional footballer who plays for Allsvenskan club Västerås SK. Born in Nigeria, he is a former Sweden youth international.

== Club career ==
Amoran played for IFK Östersund as a 17 year-old in 2021, where he was named player of the season in his division. He was then promoted to the Östersunds FK squad.

He made his debut in the Superettan for Östersunds in 2022 as an 18 year-old. He made 13 league appearances for the club before he was signed by Parma in 2022. He signed a new three-year contract with Parma in the summer of 2024. Ahead of the 2024–25 season he was loaned to Perugia, making his debut in Serie C in August 2024.

On 27 August 2025, Amoran was loaned by Cesena in Serie B, with an option to buy.

On 30 August 2026, Amoran returned to Sweden and signed a contract with Västerås SK until the end of 2029.

== International career ==
He is a Swedish youth international. In November 2024, he scored for Sweden U21 against Ireland U21.

== Personal life ==
His brother Nathan is a basketball player. He is a Christian.
