= Pierre-Antoine Martini =

French footballer (born 1988)

Personal information
- Full name: Pierre-Antoine Martini
- Date of birth: June 27, 1988 (age 38)
- Place of birth: Marseille, France
- Height: 6 ft 2 in (1.88 m)
- Position: Goalkeeper

Senior career*
Years	Team	Apps	(Gls)
2005–2008	OGC Nice	0	(0)
2008	Yeovil Town	0	(0)
2008	Tiverton Town	2	(0)
2008	Livingston	13	(0)
- * Club domestic league appearances and goals as of 21:01, 30 December 2008 (UTC)

Pierre-Antoine Martini (born June 27, 1988) is a French footballer, and is currently without a club. He last played for Livingston in the Scottish Football League First Division. He is a goalkeeper.
