= 2023–24 Scottish Junior Cup =

Tournament details
- Country: Scotland
- Teams: 112

Final positions
- Champions: Darvel (1st title)
- Runners-up: Arthurlie

Tournament statistics
- Matches played: 110
- Goals scored: 445 (4.05 per match)
- All statistics correct as of 2 June 2024.

The 2023–24 Scottish Junior Cup (known as the Clydebuilt Home Improvements Scottish Junior Cup due to sponsorship reasons), was the 137th season of the Scottish Junior Cup, the national knockout tournament for member clubs of the Scottish Junior Football Association (SJFA). A total of 112 clubs entered the competition, four more than in 2022–23.

Camelon Juniors, Caledonian Locomotives (previously Rossvale), Hall Russell United, Kello Rovers, Pollok, Pumpherston, and Whitehills returned to take part in the competition while Finnart and Rossvale (formerly Rossvale Academy) entered for the first time. Glasgow Perthshire, Harthill Royal, and Livingston United did not compete, along with Aberdeen University who also withdrew from their league and Syngenta who had folded.

Defending champions Cumnock Juniors were eliminated in the second round by local rivals Auchinleck Talbot. Darvel defeated Auchinleck in the semi-final en route to claiming the trophy for the first time.

== Calendar ==
The dates for each round of the 2023–24 tournament were as follows:

Round	Main date	Matches	Clubs
First round	2 September 2023	48	112 → 64
Second round	7 October 2023	32	64 → 32
Third round	4 November 2023	16	32 → 16
Fourth round	2 December 2023	8	16 → 8
Quarter-finals	10 February 2024	4	8 → 4
Semi-finals	13 April & 20 April 2024	2	4 → 2
Final	2 June 2024	1	2 → 1

Drawn matches proceed direct to a penalty shootout, with no extra time. The semi-finals reverted back to being played home and away over two legs after two seasons as single legs at neutral venues.

== First round ==
The 15 clubs taking part in the Scottish Cup — Auchinleck Talbot, Beith Juniors, Benburb, Camelon Juniors, Carluke Rovers, Carnoustie Panmure, Culter, Cumnock Juniors, Darvel, Glenafton Athletic, Irvine Meadow XI, Lochee United, Pollok, Rutherglen Glencairn, and Tayport — received a bye into the second round draw along with St Anthony's.

Home team	Score	Away team
2 September 2023
Arbroath Victoria	4–2	Dundee St James
Banchory St Ternan	0–8	Maybole Juniors
Blairgowrie	0–3	Troon
Brechin Victoria	0–2	Bellshill Athletic
Bridge of Don Thistle	0–0 (4–3 p)	Maryhill
Buchanhaven Hearts	0–0 (4–5 p)	Ardeer Thistle
Burghead Thistle	1–3	Lesmahagow Juniors
Coupar Angus	1–3	Rothie Rovers
Cruden Bay	1–6	Stoneywood-Parkvale
Cumbernauld United	0–4	Dundee North End
Dalry Thistle	3–1	Royal Albert
Dufftown	0–3	Lochee Harp
Ellon United	1–3	Downfield
Forres Thistle	1–5	Letham
Fraserburgh United	1–4	Shotts Bon Accord
Gartcairn	2–2 (5–4 p)	Kirkintilloch Rob Roy
Glentanar	2–2 (4–3 p)	Deveronside
Hermes	3–1	Armadale Thistle
Hurlford United	3–2	Sunnybank
Irvine Victoria	7–0	Forfar West End
Islavale	2–2 (6–7 p)	Greenock Juniors
Johnstone Burgh	3–0	East Craigie
Kilbirnie Ladeside	1–1 (2–4 p)	Ashfield

Home team	Score	Away team
Kilsyth Rangers	0–4	Arthurlie
Lanark United	1–3	Craigmark Burntonians
Largs Thistle	5–0	Lugar Boswell Thistle
Larkhall Thistle	3–0	Thorniewood United
Longside	1–2	Colony Park
Lossiemouth United	0–0 (3–4 p)	Hall Russell United
Maud	1–4	Dundee Violet
Muirkirk Juniors	3–3 (9–10 p)	East Kilbride Thistle
Nairn St. Ninian	0–4	Ardrossan Winton Rovers
New Elgin	1–4	Banks O' Dee Junior
Newmains United	0–6	Dyce
Petershill	7–0	Cambuslang Rangers
Pumpherston	0–3	Finnart
Saltcoats Victoria	2–4	Forfar United
Scone Thistle	1–1 (2–4 p)	Kello Rovers
St Cadoc's	2–1	Blantyre Victoria
St Roch's	3–1	Bathgate Thistle
Stonehaven	1–0	Kirriemuir Thistle
Stoneyburn	1–1 (2–4 p)	East End
Vale of Clyde	1–3	Glasgow United
Vale of Leven	2–1	Newmachar United
West Calder United	1–2	Montrose Roselea
Whitehills	2–7	Caledonian Locomotives
Wishaw Juniors	1–2	Rossvale
Yoker Athletic	0–3	Broughty Athletic

== Second round ==
=== Matches ===
Home team	Score	Away team
6 October 2023
Petershill	1–5	St Cadoc's
Banks O' Dee Junior	1–2	Montrose Roselea
7 October 2023
Arbroath Victoria	1–4	Benburb
Ardeer Thistle	0–1	Larkhall Thistle
Ardrossan Winton Rovers	2–3	Downfield
Bridge of Don Thistle	6–1	Irvine Victoria
Broughty Athletic	0–2	Bellshill Athletic
Caledonian Locomotives	2–1	Glasgow United
Camelon Juniors	w/o	Stonehaven
Colony Park	0–1	Rothie Rovers
Culter	4–2	Craigmark Burntonians
Cumnock Juniors	2–3	Auchinleck Talbot
Hall Russell United	2–5	Lesmahagow Juniors
Hermes	1–1 (3–1 p)	Beith Juniors
Lochee Harp	3–4	Irvine Meadow XI
Lochee United	3–2	Maybole Juniors
Rossvale	1–4	Darvel
St Anthony's	3–2	Stoneywood-Parkvale

Home team	Score	Away team
14 October 2023
Carnoustie Panmure	3–2	Letham
Dundee Violet	3–0	Deveronside
East End	5–0	East Kilbride Thistle
Finnart	2–1	Dyce
Kello Rovers	2–3	Gartcairn
Vale of Leven	1–0	Carluke Rovers
17 October 2023
Pollok	2–2 (7–8 p)	Dalry Thistle
18 October 2023
Greenock Juniors	1–4	Glenafton Athletic
4 November 2023
Ashfield	1–3	Largs Thistle
Forfar United	1–6	Arthurlie
Hurlford United	6–0	Tayport
Johnstone Burgh	3–0	Dundee North End
Rutherglen Glencairn	2–0	Troon
Shotts Bon Accord	0–0 (6–5 p)	St. Roch's

== Third round ==
=== Matches ===
Home team	Score	Away team
4 November 2023
Bellshill Athletic	3–1	Lesmahagow Juniors
Bridge of Don Thistle	1–1 (2–4 p)	Auchinleck Talbot
Caledonian Locomotives	4–2	Carnoustie Panmure
Culter	0–2	Lochee United
Finnart	1–4	Larkhall Thistle
Glenafton Athletic	1–2	Darvel
St. Anthony's	2–2 (5–6 p)	Benburb
Stonehaven	2–0	East End
Vale of Leven	4–2	Montrose Roselea
11 November 2023
Downfield	1–0	Dalry Thistle
Dundee Violet	0–3	St Cadoc's
Gartcairn	2–3	Largs Thistle
Hermes	0–8	Hurlford United
Johnstone Burgh	3–1	Irvine Meadow XI
Rothie Rovers	4–3	Shotts Bon Accord
Rutherglen Glencairn	3–3 (3–4 p)	Arthurlie

== Fourth round ==
=== Draw ===
Tier	6	7	8	9
Teams	Midlands League (2): Downfield; Lochee United; North Region Premier Division (2): Rothie Rovers; Stonehaven; West of Scotland League Premier Division (7): Arthurlie; Auchinleck Talbot; Benburb; Darvel; Largs Thistle; Hurlford United; St Cadoc's	West of Scotland League First Division (1): Johnstone Burgh	West of Scotland League Second Division (2): Caledonian Locomotives; Larkhall Thistle	West of Scotland League Third Division (2): Bellshill Athletic; Vale of Leven

=== Matches ===
Home team	Score	Away team
2 December 2023
Largs Thistle	2–2 (0–3 p)	Lochee United
9 December 2023
Stonehaven	0–1	St Cadoc's
16 December 2023
Hurlford United	3–2	Caledonian Locomotives
Benburb	2–3	Arthurlie
Rothie Rovers	1–4	Bellshill Athletic
Vale of Leven	1–4	Auchinleck Talbot
Darvel	4–0	Larkhall Thistle
27 January 2024
Johnstone Burgh	2–2 (4–3 p)	Downfield

== Quarter-finals ==
=== Draw ===
Tier	6	7	9
Teams	Midlands League (1): Lochee United; West of Scotland League Premier Division (5): Arthurlie; Auchinleck Talbot; Darvel; Hurlford United; St Cadoc's	West of Scotland League First Division (1): Johnstone Burgh	West of Scotland League Third Division (1): Bellshill Athletic

=== Matches ===
Home team	Score	Away team
10 February 2024
Darvel	3–0	Lochee United
Johnstone Burgh	3–3 (4–1 p)	St Cadoc's
Bellshill Athletic	1–2	Arthurlie
Auchinleck Talbot	3–0	Hurlford United

== Semi-finals ==
Tier	6	7
Teams	West of Scotland League Premier Division (3): Arthurlie; Auchinleck Talbot; Darvel	West of Scotland League First Division (1): Johnstone Burgh

=== First leg ===
12 April 2024
19:30

Auchinleck Talbot	0–2	Darvel
	Report	J. Moore 38'; G. Wilson 65' (Pen.)

Beechwood Park, Auchinleck
Attendance: 1,128
Referee: Ross Menzies

14 April 2024
14:30

Arthurlie	2–2	Johnstone Burgh
Docherty 7'; Bradley 58'	Report	Lafferty 34' (Pen.); Esplin 76'

Dunterlie Park, Barrhead
Attendance: 1,328
Referee: Keiran Trayner

=== Second leg ===
19 April 2024
19:30

Darvel	0–1	Auchinleck Talbot
	Report	A. Wilson 20'

Recreation Park, Darvel
Referee: Ryan Kennedy

Darvel won 2–1 on aggregate.

20 April 2024
17:30

Johnstone Burgh	1–2	Arthurlie
Brophy 18'	Report	Bolger 23'; McGuigan 50'

Keanie Park, Johnstone
Referee: Gary Hanvidge

Arthurlie won 4–3 on aggregate.

== Final ==
The Final of the Scottish Junior Cup was played at Broadwood Stadium, Cumbernauld on Sunday 2 June with a 4.05pm kick off. The game was televised live by BBC Alba.

2 June 2024
16:05

Darvel	2–1	Arthurlie
G. Wilson 55', 88'	Report	Anson 50'

Broadwood Stadium, Cumbernauld
Attendance: 3,491
Referee: Ryan Lee
