= Cameron MacDonald =

Scottish footballer

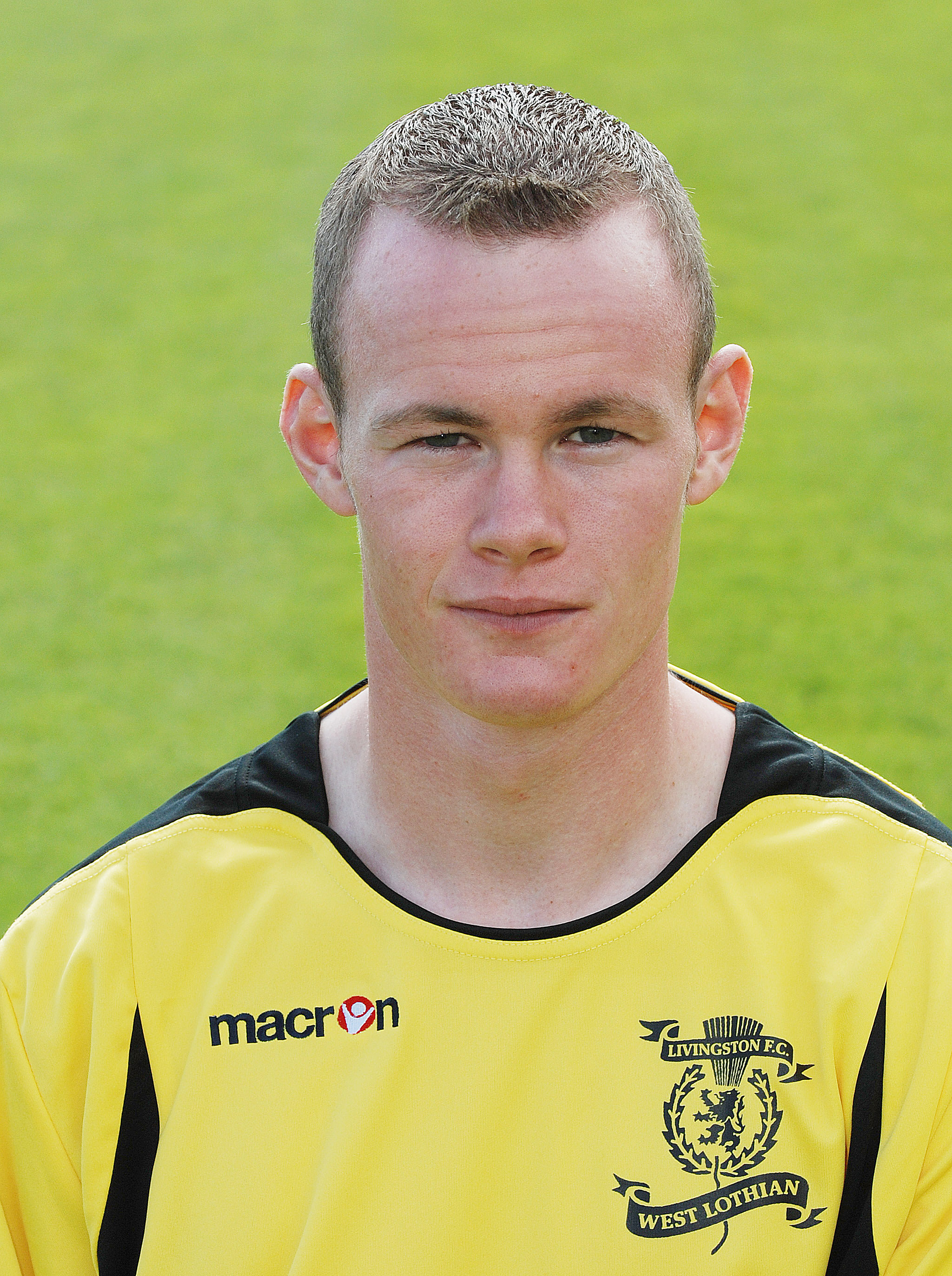
- MacDonald spent seven years with Livingston

Personal information
- Full name: Cameron MacDonald
- Date of birth: 3 December 1989 (age 36)
- Place of birth: Lochgilphead, Scotland
- Height: 6 ft 1 in (1.85 m)
- Position: Defender

Senior career*
Years	Team	Apps	(Gls)
2006–2012	Livingston	118	(1)
2012	Airdrie United	32	(1)
2013	Kitsap Pumas	13	(1)
2013	Kitsap Pumas (indoor)	2	(4)
2013-2014	Montrose		
2013	→ Elgin		
- * Club domestic league appearances and goals

Cameron "Cammy" MacDonald (born 3 December 1989 in Lochgilphead, Scotland) is a Scottish footballer, who played as a defender.

He formerly played for Airdrie United and Livingston in Scotland.

== Early life ==
MacDonald grew up in Lochgilphead, Argyll where he attended Lochgilphead Primary School and Lochgilphead High School. During his school years he played shinty for local side Kilmory Camanachd and football for various Lochgilphead Soccer Centre teams. At 12 he signed for Paisley & District outfit St Peters Boys Club. After 2 successful seasons he had a short trial with Livingston Football Club before signing youth forms with their Under 15 side.

== Career ==
=== Livingston ===
MacDonald has played for Livingston Football Club's Under 15, Under 17, Under 19, Reserve and First Team. During his time in the Under 19s he was part of a side that won 4 Scottish Football League Under 19 Championships, 2 Scottish Football League Under 19 League Cups and were twice runners-up in Scottish Football League Reserve Cups.

He made his debut as a seventeen-year-old with a substitute appearance against Hibernian in a pre-season friendly on the 18 July 2007. His competitive debut came on 5 January 2008 in a Scottish First Division clash with Greenock Morton at Almondvale Stadium. Livingston ran out 6–1 winners and MacDonald was awarded Man of the Match.

At the end of season 2009–10 MacDonald was awarded both the Livingston FC Player of the Year and supporters club Livi Lions Player of the Year awards.

MacDonald requested to leave Livingston in January 2012 and had his contract cancelled by mutual consent.

=== Airdrie ===
MacDonald joined Scottish First Division club Airdrie United in January 2012. He was sent off in his first game on 21 January against Dumbarton. MacDonald made a further 16 appearances for Airdrie and was a key member of the side as they lost only once and kept 7 clean sheets during the final third of the season.

In May 2012 MacDonald agreed an extension to his contract with Airdrie United until the end of the 2012-13 season, but left the club by mutual consent in December 2012 in order to pursue a move to the USA.

=== Kitsap Pumas ===
After multiple offers from clubs from various countries MacDonald signed for Kitsap Pumas in March 2013. He joined his teammates for pre-season training in April 2013 and quickly endeared himself to them and the club's fans by scoring a 30-yard goal on his debut in a 4-0 friendly win against Bellingham United.

In September MacDonald agreed terms to play for the Pumas professional indoor team for the winter 2013 season and after being deployed as a striker has scored 4 goals in his first two games.

== Honours ==
Livingston

- Scottish Third Division: 2009–10
- Scottish Under 19 Division (3): 2007–08, 2008–09, 2009–10

Kitsap Pumas

- Ruffneck Cup Winner: 2013
