= Brian Wake =

English footballer and coach

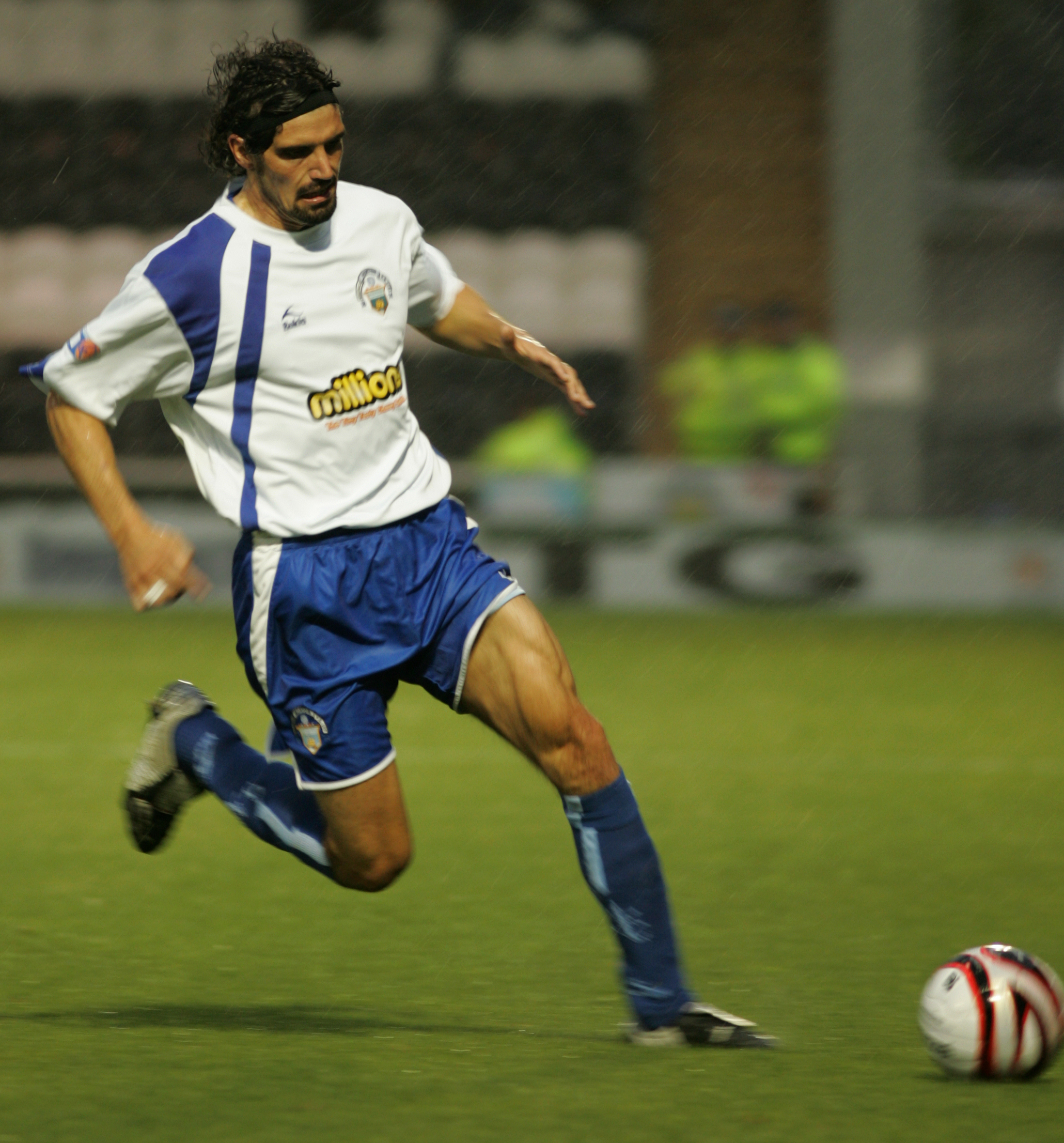

Personal information
- Full name: Brian Christopher Wake
- Date of birth: 13 August 1982 (age 44)
- Place of birth: Stockton-on-Tees, England
- Height: 6 ft 0 in (1.83 m)
- Position: Striker

Team information
- Current team: Viborg (under-17 manager)

Youth career
- Tow Law Town

Senior career*
Years	Team	Apps	(Gls)
2002–2004	Carlisle United	43	(9)
2004–2005	Gretna	17	(8)
2005–2006	Scarborough	13	(5)
2006–2008	Hamilton Academical	61	(11)
2008–2010	Greenock Morton	56	(17)
2010–2011	Gateshead	31	(3)
2011–2012	Östersund	33	(26)
2012	Umeå	10	(1)
2013	IFK Östersund	13	(10)
2014–2017	Ytterhogdals	46	(29)
2018–2019	ÖFK Cosmos	4	(2)
Total		327	(121)

Managerial career
- 2013–2014: Östersund (assistant manager)
- 2016–2017: Ytterhogdals IK
- 2018: Luleå
- 2018–2020: Östersund (assistant manager)
- 2021: Kjellerup (reserves manager)
- 2021–: Viborg (under-17 manager)
- * Club domestic league appearances and goals

Brian Wake (born 13 August 1982) is an English former footballer who played as a striker. He currently works as a youth coach at Viborg.

== Playing career ==
Wake's notable contributions in football have been a hat-trick at Shrewsbury to keep Carlisle in The Football League, winning a first division title medal with Hamilton Accies (although he had left for Morton in January 2008) and four goals in Morton's last three games of season 2007–08 (including a double at Firhill against Partick Thistle) to keep them in Division One.

Wake signed a new contract in May 2009, along with Alex Walker, for another year at Morton.

Wake scored the 50th league goal of his career against Airdrie United in November 2009.

Wake signed for Gateshead on 26 January 2010, making his debut as a 55th-minute substitute in a 2–0 defeat to Kettering Town. Wake scored his first goals for Gateshead on 6 February against Mansfield Town. He was made available for transfer by Gateshead on 13 January 2011 after only managing to make 7 substitute appearances up to then during the 2010–11 season. Two days later, Wake scored his first goal of the season as a second-half substitute in a 6–0 win in the FA Trophy against Hampton & Richmond Borough. On 10 March 2011, it was announced that Wake had secured a move to an unnamed Swedish club on a two-year contract, the club was later revealed to be Östersunds FK.

He made his competitive debut for Östersund against Friska Viljor in the first round of the 2011 Svenska Cupen, scoring four goals in a 6–1 victory. Interviewed for PAFC managers position 2019-20

On 25 July 2012, Wake signed for Superettan side Umeå. He made his debut on 4 August 2012 in a 0–1 loss to Hammarby. He scored his first goal for Umeå on 13 August 2012 in a 1–0 win over Jönköpings Södra. In January 2013 it was announced that Wake would return to Östersund where he would play for IFK Östersund combined with working as first-team coach for his former club Östersunds FK.

== Managerial career ==
Wake combined playing part-time for Ytterhogdals with coaching at Östersund. He took over as player-manager of Ytterhogdals ahead of the 2016 season. In 2018, he took over as manager of Luleå but left halfway through the season to return to coach at Östersund. In February 2021, he moved to Denmark to coach at Kjellerup. Later in the year, he joined Viborg to take over their under-17 side.

== Honours ==
Carlisle United

- Football League Trophy runner-up: 2002–03

Hamilton Academical

- Scottish Football League First Division: 2007–08

Östersund

- Division 2 Norrland: 2011
- DM Cup: 2011

== Career statistics ==
=== Club ===
As of 20 August 2012

Club	Season	League^{[A]}		FA Cup^{[B]}		League Cup		Other^{[C]}		Total	
Club	Season	Apps	Goals	Apps	Goals	Apps	Goals	Apps	Goals	Apps	Goals
Carlisle United	2002–03	28	9	1	0	1	0	3	0	33	9
Carlisle United	2003–04	15	0	1	0	1	0	2	2	19	2
Carlisle United	Total	43	9	2	0	2	0	5	2	52	11
Gretna	2003–04	11	5	0	0	0	0	0	0	11	5
Gretna	2004–05	6	3	0	0	0	0	1	0	7	3
Gretna	Total	17	8	0	0	0	0	1	0	18	8
Scarborough	2005–06	13	5	1	0	0	0	0	0	14	5
Hamilton Academical	2005–06	10	5	4	0	0	0	0	0	14	5
Hamilton Academical	2006–07	32	5	1	0	0	0	1	0	34	5
Hamilton Academical	2007–08	19	1	0	0	4	2	1	0	24	3
Hamilton Academical	Total	61	11	5	0	4	2	2	0	72	13
Greenock Morton	2007–08	11	4	1	0	0	0	0	0	12	4
Greenock Morton	2008–09	32	9	1	0	3	2	3	1	39	12
Greenock Morton	2009–10	13	4	3	0	2	0	1	0	19	4
Greenock Morton	Total	56	17	5	0	5	2	4	1	70	20
Gateshead	2009–10	18	3	0	0	0	0	2	0	20	3
Gateshead	2010–11	13	0	0	0	0	0	3	2	16	2
Gateshead	Total	31	3	0	0	0	0	5	2	36	5
Östersund	2011	20	24	2	4	0	0	2	3	24	31
Östersund	2012	13	2	0	0	0	0	0	0	13	2
Östersund	Total	33	26	2	4	0	0	2	3	37	33
Umeå	2012	10	1	0	0	0	0	0	0	10	1
Career totals		264	80	15	4	11	4	19	8	309	96

A. The "League" column constitutes appearances and goals (including those as a substitute) in The Football League, Scottish Football League, Football Conference, Superettan, Swedish football Division 1 & Swedish football Division 2.
B. The "FA Cup" column constitutes appearances and goals (including those as a substitute) in the FA Cup & Svenska Cupen.
C. The "Other" column constitutes appearances and goals (including those as a substitute) in the FA Trophy, Football League Trophy, Scottish Challenge Cup & DM Cup.
