= Fernando Giarrizo =

Argentine footballer

Fernando Giarrizzo
Personal information
- Full name: Fernando Luis Giarrizzo
- Date of birth: 17 January 1985 (age 41)
- Place of birth: Mendoza, Argentina
- Height: 1.81 m (5 ft 11 in)
- Position: Midfielder

Senior career*
Years	Team	Apps	(Gls)
2003–2004	Godoy Cruz	28	(2)
2005	Brown de Adrogué	11	(2)
2005–2006	Platense	20	(4)
2006–2008	Independiente Rivadavia	25	(1)
2008	Livingston	4	(0)
2009	Naval 1º de Maio	0	(0)
2009	Deportivo Morón	9	(1)
2010	Deportivo Maipú	12	(1)
2010	Naval	1	(0)
2011–2012	Gimnasia CdU	28	(2)
2012	Ferrocarril Sud	10	(3)
2013	Sport Boys Warnes	28	(8)
2013–2014	Victoria Wanderers	23	(11)
2014	San Simón	11	(0)
- * Club domestic league appearances and goals

Fernando Luis Giarrizo (in some sources, Giarrizzo; born 17 January 1985) is an Argentine former professional footballer who played as a midfielder.

== Career ==
Giarrizo was born in Mendoza, Argentina. He played during his career in the Scottish First Division for Livingston F.C. He also played in his homeland with Godoy Cruz Antonio Tomba, Brown de Adrogué, Club Atlético Platense, Independiente Rivadavia, Club Deportivo Maipu, Deportivo Morón, Gimnasia y Esgrima de Concepción del Uruguay, Futbol Club Ferro Carril Sud; as well for Chilean club Deportes Naval, Portuguese club Associação Naval 1º de Maio and Bolivian side Sport Boys Warnes.

=== Teams ===
- (Argentina) Godoy Cruz (2003–2004)
- (Argentina) Brown de Adrogué (2005)
- (Argentina) Platense (2005–2006)
- (Argentina) Independiente Rivadavia (2006–2008)
- (Scotland) Livingston (2008)
- (Portugal) Naval (2009)
- (Argentina) Deportivo Morón (2009)
- (Argentina) Deportivo Maipú (2010)
- (Chile) Naval (2010)
- (Argentina) Gimnasia y Esgrima de Concepción del Uruguay (2011–2012)
- (Argentina) Ferrocarril Sud (2012)
- (Bolivia) Sport Boys Warnes (2013)
- (Malta) Victoria Wanderers (2013–2014)
- (Peru) San Simón (2014)
