= Mark Torrance =

Scottish footballer

Personal information
- Full name: Mark Torrance
- Date of birth: 6 April 1989 (age 37)
- Place of birth: Edinburgh, Scotland
- Position: Midfielder

Senior career*
Years	Team	Apps	(Gls)
2005–2010	Livingston	6	(0)
2010	Cowdenbeath		
2013–2015	Edinburgh City		
2015–2017	Craigroyston		
2017–2018	Haddington Athletic		
2018–2019	Tynecastle		
- * Club domestic league appearances and goals as of 01:08, 15 January 2018 (UTC)

Mark Torrance (born 6 April 1989 in Edinburgh, Scotland) is a Scottish footballer. He is a midfielder.
