= Frösö IF =

Swedish football club

- Full name: Frösö Idrottsförening
- Founded: 1921
- Ground: Lövsta Aktivitetscenter (Artificial pitch); Frösön; Sweden
- Head coach: Linus Ferm, Anton Olofsson
- League: Division 2 Norrland
Home colours	Away colours

Frösö IF is a Swedish football club located in Frösön which is west of the city Östersund in Jämtland.

== Background ==
Frösö Idrottsförening was officially founded on 3 April 1921 when the formal constitution was laid down but records indicate that the sports club was in existence 10 years earlier, having been formed by a bunch of sports fans who got together in 1910. They called themselves "Bergviksgrabbarna" (Bergvik boys) and concentrated their efforts on football and track and field disciplines, including shot put and javelin. The club has since specialised in a wide range of sports including athletics, bandy, bowling, football, handball, floorball, karting, orienteering, skiing, table tennis, casting (fishing) and weightlifting.

Since their foundation Frösö IF has participated mainly in the middle and lower divisions of the Swedish football league system. The football club began to play friendly matches from 1923 to 1924. In 1964 Frösö IF competed for the first time in Sweden's third division and in 1968 they played one season in Sweden's second division which was followed by relegation. The club currently plays in Division 2 Norrland which is the fourth tier of Swedish football. They play their home matches at the Lövsta Aktivitetscenter in Frösön.

Frösö IF are affiliated to the Jämtland-Härjedalens FF.

== Season to season ==
Season	Level	Division	Section	Position	Movements
1993	Tier 5	Division 4	Jämtland/Härjedalen	1st	Promoted
1994	Tier 4	Division 3	Mellersta Norrland	3rd	
1995	Tier 4	Division 3	Mellersta Norrland	3rd	
1996	Tier 4	Division 3	Mellersta Norrland	7th	
1997	Tier 4	Division 3	Mellersta Norrland	11th	Relegated
1998	Tier 5	Division 4	Jämtland/Härjedalen	2nd	Promotion Playoffs
1999	Tier 5	Division 4	Jämtland/Härjedalen	1st	Promoted
2000	Tier 4	Division 3	Mellersta Norrland	5th	
2001	Tier 4	Division 3	Mellersta Norrland	11th	Relegated
2002	Tier 5	Division 4	Jämtland/Härjedalen	1st	Promotion Playoffs
2003	Tier 5	Division 4	Jämtland/Härjedalen	3rd	
2004	Tier 5	Division 4	Jämtland/Härjedalen	5th	
2005	Tier 5	Division 4	Jämtland/Härjedalen	7th	
2006*	Tier 6	Division 4	Jämtland/Härjedalen	1st	Promotion Playoffs – Promoted
2007	Tier 5	Division 3	Mellersta Norrland	3rd	
2008	Tier 5	Division 3	Mellersta Norrland	6th	
2009	Tier 5	Division 3	Mellersta Norrland	7th	
2010	Tier 5	Division 3	Mellersta Norrland	3rd	
2011	Tier 5	Division 3	Mellersta Norrland	9th	Relegation Playoffs – Relegated
2012	Tier 6	Division 4	Jämtland/Härjedalen	3rd	
2013	Tier 6	Division 4	Jämtland/Härjedalen	1st	Promotion Playoffs – Promoted
2014	Tier 5	Division 3	Mellersta Norrland	4th	
2015	Tier 5	Division 3	Mellersta Norrland	7th	
2016	Tier 5	Division 3	Mellersta Norrland	6th	
2017	Tier 5	Division 3	Mellersta Norrland	8th	
2018	Tier 5	Division 3	Mellersta Norrland	2nd	
2019	Tier 5	Division 3	Mellersta Norrland	2nd	
2020	Tier 5	Division 3	Mellersta Norrland	1st	Promoted

* League restructuring in 2006 resulted in a new division being created at Tier 3 and subsequent divisions dropping a level.

== Attendances ==
In recent seasons Frösö IF have had the following average attendances:

Season	Average Attendance	Division / Section	Level
2006	Not available	Div 4 Jämtland/Härjedalen	Tier 6
2007	147	Div 3 Mellersta Norrland	Tier 5
2008	129	Div 3 Mellersta Norrland	Tier 5
2009	180	Div 3 Mellersta Norrland	Tier 5
2010	184	Div 3 Mellersta Norrland	Tier 5
2011	160	Div 3 Mellersta Norrland	Tier 5
2012	79	Div 4 Jämtland/Härjedalen	Tier 6
2013	82	Div 4 Jämtland/Härjedalen	Tier 6
2014	100	Div 3 Mellersta Norrland	Tier 5
2015	63	Div 3 Mellersta Norrland	Tier 5
2016	82	Div 3 Mellersta Norrland	Tier 5

* Attendances are provided in the Publikliga sections of the Svenska Fotbollförbundet website.

The attendance record for Frösö IF was around 1,500 spectators for the match against IFK Östersund in 1967.
