= 2009–10 Scottish Third Division =

Scottish Football League Third Division

Irn-Bru Scottish Third Division
- Season: 2009–10
- Champions: Livingston
- Promoted: Livingston; Forfar Athletic
- Relegated: n/a
- Matches: 180
- Goals: 460 (2.56 per match)
- Top goalscorer: Craig Gunn (18)
- Biggest home win: Forfar Athletic 5–1 East Stirlingshire (29 August 2009); East Stirlingshire 4–0 Forfar Athletic (6 March 2010); Montrose 4–0 Forfar Athletic (16 March 2010)
- Biggest away win: Elgin City 1–6 Livingston (7 November 2009); Montrose 0–5 Livingston (24 April 2010)
- Highest scoring: Montrose 4–5 Stranraer (16 February 2010)
- Longest winning run: 8 games East Stirlingshire
- Longest unbeaten run: 12 games Livingston
- Longest winless run: 19 games Montrose
- Longest losing run: 4 games Albion Rovers; Annan Athletic; East Stirlingshire; Livingston

The 2009–10 Scottish Football League Third Division (also known as the 2009–10 Irn-Bru Scottish Football League Third Division for sponsorship reasons) was the 16th season in the format of ten teams in the fourth-tier of Scottish football. The season started on 8 August 2009 and ended on 1 May 2010. Livingston F.C. finished top and were promoted alongside Forfar Athletic as play-off winners.

== Teams ==
=== Promotion and relegation from 2008–09 ===
Location of teams in 2009-10 Scottish Third Division

Dumbarton as champions of the 2008–09 season were directly promoted to the 2009–10 Scottish Second Division. They were replaced by Stranraer who finished bottom of the 2008–09 Scottish Second Division.

A second promotion place was available via a play-off tournament between the ninth-placed team of the 2008–09 Scottish Second Division, Queen's Park, and the sides ranked second, third and fourth in the 2008–09 Scottish Third Division, Cowdenbeath, East Stirlingshire and Stenhousemuir respectively. The play off was won by Stenhousemuir who defeated Cowdenbeath in the final. Queen's Park were therefore relegated. However, Livingston F.C. were demoted to the Third Division, leading to an extra promotion being awarded. Cowdenbeath as runners-up of the play-off final were therefore promoted.

Relegated from First Division to Third Division

- Livingston

Relegated from Second Division to Third Division

- Stranraer
- Queen's Park (via playoffs)

Promoted from Third Division to Second Division

- Dumbarton
- Stenhousemuir (via playoffs)
- Cowdenbeath (losing play-off finalists, promoted due to Livingston's demotion to the Third Division)

=== Stadia and locations ===
| Team | Location | Stadium | Capacity |
|---|---|---|---|
| Albion Rovers | Coatbridge | Cliftonhill | 2,496 |
| Annan Athletic | Annan | Galabank | 3,000 |
| Livingston | Livingston | Almondvale Stadium | 10,005 |
| Berwick Rangers | Berwick-upon-Tweed | Shielfield Park | 4,065 |
| Forfar Athletic | Forfar | Station Park | 5,177 |
| East Stirlingshire | Stenhousemuir | Ochilview Park^{[A]} | 3,746 |
| Elgin City | Elgin | Borough Briggs | 3,716 |
| Montrose | Montrose | Links Park | 3,292 |
| Queen's Park | Glasgow | Hampden Park | 52,025 |
| Stranraer | Stranraer | Stair Park | 6,250 |

A.East Stirlingshire ground shared with Stenhousemuir.

== League table ==
| Pos | Team | Pld | W | D | L | GF | GA | GD | Pts | Promotion or qualification |
|---|---|---|---|---|---|---|---|---|---|---|
| 1 | Livingston (C, P) | 36 | 24 | 6 | 6 | 63 | 25 | +38 | 78 | Promotion to the Second Division |
| 2 | Forfar Athletic (P, O) | 36 | 18 | 9 | 9 | 59 | 44 | +15 | 63 | Qualification for the Second Division Play-offs (Note: The 2nd, 3rd and 4th placed teams will be entered into a play-off with the Second Division's 9th placed team. The winning team will be awarded a place in the 2010–11 Second Division.) |
| 3 | East Stirlingshire | 36 | 19 | 4 | 13 | 50 | 46 | +4 | 61 | Qualification for the Second Division Play-offs |
| 4 | Queen's Park | 36 | 15 | 6 | 15 | 42 | 42 | 0 | 51 | Qualification for the Second Division Play-offs |
| 5 | Albion Rovers | 36 | 13 | 11 | 12 | 35 | 35 | 0 | 50 | |
| 6 | Berwick Rangers | 36 | 14 | 8 | 14 | 46 | 50 | −4 | 50 | |
| 7 | Stranraer | 36 | 13 | 8 | 15 | 48 | 54 | −6 | 47 | |
| 8 | Annan Athletic | 36 | 11 | 10 | 15 | 41 | 42 | −1 | 43 | |
| 9 | Elgin City | 36 | 9 | 7 | 20 | 46 | 59 | −13 | 34 | |
| 10 | Montrose | 36 | 5 | 9 | 22 | 30 | 63 | −33 | 24 | |

Source: Scottish Football League
Rules for classification: 1) points; 2) goal difference; 3) number of goals scored.
(C) Champions; (O) Play-off winners; (P) Promoted

== Results ==
Teams play each other four times in this league. In the first half of the season each team plays every other team twice (home and away) and then do the same in the second half of the season.

=== First half of season ===
| Home \ Away | ALB | ANN | BER | EST | ELG | FOR | LIV | MON | QPA | STR |
|---|---|---|---|---|---|---|---|---|---|---|
| Albion Rovers | | 0–0 | 2–1 | 3–0 | 1–1 | 1–1 | 1–0 | 0–0 | 0–1 | 3–1 |
| Annan Athletic | 0–0 | | 1–1 | 0–1 | 0–2 | 1–0 | 0–0 | 2–0 | 3–1 | 1–0 |
| Berwick Rangers | 2–0 | 2–1 | | 0–1 | 2–0 | 0–1 | 1–0 | 2–0 | 1–0 | 1–0 |
| East Stirlingshire | 2–0 | 1–3 | 1–0 | | 1–1 | 2–1 | 3–1 | 1–0 | 1–0 | 1–1 |
| Elgin City | 0–2 | 1–1 | 3–3 | 1–2 | | 0–2 | 1–6 | 0–1 | 0–1 | 1–2 |
| Forfar Athletic | 2–2 | 2–1 | 2–0 | 5–1 | 3–3 | | 0–1 | 2–2 | 0–1 | 1–0 |
| Livingston | 2–0 | 2–0 | 1–1 | 2–0 | 3–2 | 1–2 | | 2–0 | 2–1 | 3–0 |
| Montrose | 0–0 | 0–0 | 1–3 | 0–3 | 1–1 | 1–2 | 0–3 | | 1–2 | 1–1 |
| Queen's Park | 0–1 | 0–0 | 2–0 | 1–0 | 0–3 | 2–2 | 1–2 | 3–2 | | 1–2 |
| Stranraer | 1–1 | 2–0 | 2–4 | 1–2 | 0–2 | 1–0 | 0–3 | 2–0 | 1–1 | |

Updated to match(es) played on 12 April 2010. Source: Scottish Football League
Legend: Blue = home team win; Yellow = draw; Red = away team win.

=== Second half of season ===
| Home \ Away | ALB | ANN | BER | EST | ELG | FOR | LIV | MON | QPA | STR |
|---|---|---|---|---|---|---|---|---|---|---|
| Albion Rovers | | 1–0 | 4–1 | 2–1 | 1–2 | 0–1 | 0–2 | 1–0 | 1–0 | 0–0 |
| Annan Athletic | 1–2 | | 0–1 | 1–0 | 3–3 | 1–1 | 2–0 | 0–0 | 0–2 | 3–2 |
| Berwick Rangers | 1–2 | 0–2 | | 2–2 | 2–1 | 0–4 | 1–1 | 0–2 | 1–1 | 1–0 |
| East Stirlingshire | 3–1 | 3–1 | 3–2 | | 2–0 | 4–0 | 0–2 | 2–3 | 0–3 | 2–0 |
| Elgin City | 3–1 | 1–0 | 1–5 | 0–1 | | 0–2 | 0–1 | 5–2 | 0–1 | 2–3 |
| Forfar Athletic | 1–1 | 1–5 | 3–0 | 4–1 | 1–0 | | 2–2 | 2–0 | 1–1 | 2–0 |
| Livingston | 2–0 | 3–2 | 0–0 | 1–0 | 1–0 | 2–3 | | 1–0 | 2–0 | 2–1 |
| Montrose | 0–0 | 1–2 | 1–1 | 0–1 | 0–4 | 4–0 | 0–5 | | 1–2 | 4–5 |
| Queen's Park | 1–0 | 3–2 | 2–3 | 2–0 | 0–1 | 1–3 | 0–1 | 3–0 | | 2–5 |
| Stranraer | 2–1 | 3–2 | 3–1 | 2–2 | 2–1 | 2–0 | 1–1 | 0–2 | 0–0 | |

Updated to match(es) played on 1 May 2010. Source: Scottish Football League
Legend: Blue = home team win; Yellow = draw; Red = away team win.
