= 2010–11 Sheffield United F.C. season =

Sheffield United
2010–11 season
- Chairman: Kevin McCabe
- Manager: Kevin Blackwell (until 14 August); Gary Speed (from 17 August to 14 December); Micky Adams (from 30 December)
- Stadium: Bramall Lane
- Championship: 23rd (relegated)
- FA Cup: Third round
- League Cup: First round
- Top goalscorer: League: Ched Evans (9); All: Ched Evans (9)
- Highest home attendance: 23,728 (vs. Leeds United, 19 March)
- Lowest home attendance: 16,888 (vs. Aston Villa, 8 January)
Home colours	Away colours	Third colours

The 2010–11 season was Sheffield United's fourth consecutive season in the Football League Championship after coming 8th in the 2009–10 season. It was Kevin Blackwell's third season in charge of United; however, he left Bramall Lane in mid-August after losing at home to QPR. Gary Speed was named as his successor but lasted only until December when he left to take over the Wales national side. Following a short spell as caretaker by John Carver, Micky Adams was appointed manager for the rest of the season. It was a turbulent season off the pitch and results declined, with Adams being unable to save the team from relegation to League One for the first time in 23 years.

== Players ==
=== First-team squad ===
As of the end of the season

Note: Flags indicate national team as defined under FIFA eligibility rules; some limited exceptions apply. Players may hold more than one non-FIFA nationality.

No.	Pos.	Nation	Player
1	GK	ENG	Steve Simonsen
2	MF	ENG	Elliott Whitehouse
4	MF	SCO	Nick Montgomery (Note: Montgomery was born in Leeds, England, but also qualified to represent Scotland internationally and represented Scotland at U-21 level.)
5	DF	ENG	Chris Morgan (captain)
6	MF	AUT	Johannes Ertl
7	FW	ENG	Darius Henderson
8	MF	IRL	Michael Doyle
9	FW	WAL	Ched Evans
10	FW	MLT	Daniel Bogdanović (Note: Bogdanović was born in Misrata, Libya, but also qualified to represent Malta internationally and made his international debut for Malta in February 2002.)
11	MF	IRL	Mark Yeates
13	GK	EST	Mihkel Aksalu
14	MF	JAM	Lee Williamson (Note: Williamson was born in Derby, England, but also qualified to represent Jamaica internationally and was first called up by Jamaica in May 2008 before making his international debut for Jamaica in September 2015.)
15	MF	ENG	Ryan France
16	DF	ENG	Andy Taylor
17	FW	ENG	Richard Cresswell
18	MF	NIR	Jamie Ward (Note: Ward was born in Birmingham, England, but also qualified to represent Northern Ireland internationally through his grandfather and represented Northern Ireland at U-18 and U-21 level before making his international debut for Northern Ireland in August 2011.)
19	MF	NOR	Erik Tønne
20	DF	ENG	Joe Mattock (on loan from West Bromwich Albion)
21	DF	AUS	Shane Lowry (Note: Lowry was born in Perth, Australia, but also qualified to represent the Republic of Ireland internationally through his parents and represented the Republic of Ireland at U-17, U-19, and U-21 level before switching his international allegiance to Australia.) (on loan from Aston Villa)
22	DF	ENG	Rob Kozluk

No.	Pos.	Nation	Player
23	DF	SCO	Neill Collins
24	MF	IRL	David McAllister
25	GK	ENG	George Long
26	MF	IRL	Seamus Conneely (Note: Conneely was born in Lambeth, England, but also qualified to represent the Republic of Ireland internationally and represented the Republic of Ireland at U-21 and U-23 level.)
27	FW	ENG	Danny Philliskirk (on loan from Chelsea)
28	MF	IRL	Stephen Quinn
30	MF	ENG	Kingsley James
31	FW	ENG	Jordan Chapell
32	DF	ENG	Phil Roe
33	DF	ARG	Elian Parrino (on loan from Estudiantes)
34	DF	ENG	Matthew Lowton
35	FW	ENG	Jordan Slew
36	MF	IRL	Matthew Harriott (Note: Harriott was born in Luton, England, but also qualified to represent the Republic of Ireland internationally and represented the Republic of Ireland at U-19 level.)
38	MF	NOR	Bjørn Helge Riise (on loan from Fulham)
39	GK	AUS	Lawrence Thomas
40	DF	ENG	Harry Maguire
41	DF	ENG	Terry Kennedy
42	DF	AUS	Marc Warren
43	MF	NOR	Kristoffer Løkberg
—	MF	HUN	András Gárdos (on loan from Ferencváros)

=== Left club during season ===
Note: Flags indicate national team as defined under FIFA eligibility rules; some limited exceptions apply. Players may hold more than one non-FIFA nationality.

No.	Pos.	Nation	Player
2	DF	ENG	Stephen Jordan (released)
3	DF	ENG	Nyron Nosworthy (Note: Nosworthy was born in Lambeth, England, but also qualified to represent Jamaica internationally through his father and Guyana internationally through his mother, and made his international debut for Jamaica in May 2012.) (on loan from Sunderland)
8	MF	ENG	Leon Britton (to Swansea City)
12	DF	FRA	Jean Calvé (on loan from Nancy)
19	FW	WAL	Sam Vokes (Note: Vokes was born in Southampton, England, but also qualified to represent Wales internationally through his grandfather and made his international debut for Wales in May 2008.) (on loan from Wolverhampton Wanderers)
23	DF	ENG	Kyle Bartley (on loan from Arsenal)
24	MF	IRL	Andy Reid (on loan from Sunderland)

No.	Pos.	Nation	Player
25	DF	ENG	Danny Batth (on loan from Wolverhampton Wanderers)
27	DF	BEL	Ritchie de Laet (on loan from Manchester United)
29	GK	ENG	Richard Wright (released)
37	FW	ENG	Marcus Bent (on loan from Birmingham City)
39	GK	ENG	Paul Crichton (retired)
40	MF	WAL	Gary Speed (retired)

== Statistics ==
=== Goals and appearances ===
As of the end of the season

No.	Pos	Nat	Player	Total		Championship		FA Cup		League Cup	
No.	Pos	Nat	Player	Apps	Goals	Apps	Goals	Apps	Goals	Apps	Goals
1	GK	(England) ENG	Steve Simonsen	47	0	43+2	0	1	0	1	0
4	MF	(England) ENG	Nick Montgomery	37	0	34+1	0	1	0	1	0
5	DF	(England) ENG	Chris Morgan	9	0	8	0	0	0	1	0
6	DF	(Austria) AUT	Johannes Ertl	30	0	25+3	0	1	0	1	0
7	FW	(England) ENG	Darius Henderson	8	2	8	2	0	0	0	0
8	MF	(Republic of Ireland) IRL	Michael Doyle	16	0	16	0	0	0	0	0
9	FW	(Wales) WAL	Ched Evans	35	9	26+8	9	1	0	0	0
10	FW	(Malta) MLT	Daniel Bogdanovic	33	5	12+20	5	1	0	0	0
11	MF	(Republic of Ireland) IRL	Mark Yeates	36	5	18+17	5	0	0	1	0
14	MF	(Jamaica) JAM	Lee Williamson	41	3	14+26	3	1	0	0	0
16	DF	(England) ENG	Andy Taylor	10	0	9	0	1	0	0	0
17	FW	(England) ENG	Richard Cresswell	36	5	30+5	5	0	0	1	0
18	MF	(Northern Ireland) NIR	Jamie Ward	21	1	13+6	0	1	1	1	0
19	MF	(Norway) NOR	Erik Tønne	2	0	0+2	0	0	0	0	0
20	DF	(England) ENG	Joe Mattock	13	0	12+1	0	0	0	0	0
21	DF	(Australia) AUS	Shane Lowry	17	0	17	0	0	0	0	0
22	DF	(England) ENG	Rob Kozluk	10	1	2+6	1	1	0	1	0
23	DF	(Scotland) SCO	Neill Collins	14	0	14	0	0	0	0	0
24	MF	(Republic of Ireland) IRL	David McAllister	3	1	1+1	1	0+1	0	0	0
25	GK	(England) ENG	George Long	1	0	1	0	0	0	0	0
27	FW	(England) ENG	Danny Philliskirk	3	0	0+3	0	0	0	0	0
28	MF	(Republic of Ireland) IRL	Stephen Quinn	38	1	33+4	1	0	0	0+1	0
30	DF	(England) ENG	Kingsley James	1	0	0	0	0	0	1	0
31	FW	(England) ENG	Jordan Chapell	1	0	0	0	0	0	1	0
33	DF	(Argentina) ARG	Elian Parrino	9	0	7+1	0	1	0	0	0
34	DF	(England) ENG	Matthew Lowton	32	4	21+11	4	0	0	0	0
35	FW	(England) ENG	Jordan Slew	8	2	5+2	2	0+1	0	0	0
36	MF	(England) ENG	Matthew Harriott	2	0	0+2	0	0	0	0	0
38	MF	(Norway) NOR	Bjørn Helge Riise	13	1	9+4	1	0	0	0	0
40	DF	(England) ENG	Harry Maguire	5	0	4+1	0	0	0	0	0
41	DF	(England) ENG	Terry Kennedy	1	0	0+1	0	0	0	0	0
Players who left before the end of the season:
2	DF	(England) ENG	Stephen Jordan	15	0	14+1	0	0	0	0	0
3	DF	(England) ENG	Nyron Nosworthy	32	0	31+1	0	0	0	0	0
8	MF	(England) ENG	Leon Britton	26	0	22+2	0	1	0	1	0
12	DF	(France) FRA	Jean Calvé	18	1	16+2	1	0	0	0	0
19	FW	(Wales) WAL	Sam Vokes	6	1	4+2	1	0	0	0	0
23	DF	(England) ENG	Kyle Bartley	23	0	21	0	1	0	1	0
24	FW	(Republic of Ireland) IRL	Andy Reid	9	2	8+1	2	0	0	0	0
25	DF	(England) ENG	Danny Batth	1	0	0+1	0	0	0	0	0
27	DF	(Belgium) BEL	Ritchie de Laet	6	0	4+2	0	0	0	0	0
29	GK	(England) ENG	Richard Wright	2	0	2	0	0	0	0	0
37	FW	(England) ENG	Marcus Bent	12	0	4+7	0	1	0	0	0

== Transfers ==
=== In ===
No.	Pos.	Nat.	Name	Age	EU	Moving from	Type	Transfer window	Ends	Transfer fee	Source
10	FW	(Malta)	Bogdanović	30	EU	Barnsley	Transfer	Summer	2012	Free	BBC Sport
6	DF	(Austria)	Ertl	27	EU	Crystal Palace	Free agent	Summer	2012	Free	BBC Sport
8	MF	(England)	Britton	27	EU	Swansea City (Wales)	Transfer	Summer	2013	Free	The Star
1	GK	(England)	Simonsen	31	EU	Stoke City	Transfer	Summer	2012	Free	Sheffield United
22	DF	(England)	Kozluk	32	EU	Barnsley	Free agent	Summer	2011	Free	BBC Sport
2	DF	(England)	Jordan	28	EU	Burnley	Free agent	Summer	2011	Free	BBC Sport
29	GK	(England)	Wright	32	EU		Free agent	Summer	2011	Free	BBC Sport
	DF	(Republic of Ireland)	Conneely	22	EU		Free agent	Winter	2012	Free	Sheffield United
24	MF	(Republic of Ireland)	McAllister	22	EU		Transfer	Winter	2012	Free	Sheffield United
8	MF	(Republic of Ireland)	Doyle	29	EU	Coventry City	Transfer	Winter		Free	BBC Sport

=== Loans in ===
No.	Pos.	Name	Country	Age	Loan club	Started	Ended	Start source	End source
3	DF	Nosworthy	(England)	30	Sunderland	21 Jul	16 Apr	BBC Sport	Sheffield United
23	DF	Bartley	(England)	19	Arsenal	10 Aug	31 Jan	BBC Sport	BBC Sport
12	DF	Calvé	(France)	26	Nancy (France)	23 Aug	7 Apr	Sheffield United F.C.	BBC Sport
33	DF	Parrino	(Argentina)	22	Estudiantes (LP) (Argentina)	1 Oct		BBC Sport	
24	MF	Reid	(Republic of Ireland)	28	Sunderland	30 Oct	31 Dec	BBC Sport	Sheffield United F.C.
27	FW	Philliskirk	(England)	20	Chelsea	10 Jan		Sheffield United F.C.	
20	DF	Mattock	(England)	20	West Bromwich Albion	13 Jan		BBC Sport	
21	DF	Lowry	(Australia)	21	Aston Villa	14 Jan		Sheffield United	
37	FW	Bent	(England)	32	Birmingham City	18 Jan	16 Apr	Birmingham City F.C.	Sheffield United F.C.
38	MF	Riise	(Norway)	27	Fulham	15 Feb		BBC Sport	
19	FW	Vokes	(Wales)	21	Wolverhampton Wanderers	15 Feb		BBC Sport	

Sources: For loan start source see "Start source". For loan end source see "End source".
EU = if holds or not a European Union passport; Country: when 2 flags, 1st flag = country that plays for internationally, 2nd flag = country of birth; No. = number on jersey; P = Position (for position name, pause mouse pointer on abbreviation); Name = Name on jersey (for more extensive name, pause mouse pointer on name); In/Out = In: The player came in on loan, Out: The player went out on loan; Loan club = the club that the player moved on loan to or the club that the player came from on loan; Started = the date when the player's loan started; Ended = the date when the player's loan ended.

=== Out ===
No.	Pos.	Name	Country	Age	Type	Moving to	Transfer window	Transfer fee	Apps	Goals	Source
37	FW	Camara	(Senegal)	33	End of contract	Atromitos (Greece)	Summer	n/a	11	2	BBC Sport
33	FW	Fortune	(England)	29	End of contract	Charlton Athletic	Summer	n/a	6	1	Sky Sports
26	DF	Geary	(Republic of Ireland)	29	End of contract		Summer	n/a	115	1	Sky Sports Sky Sports
15	MF	Harper	(England)	29	End of contract	Hull City	Summer	n/a	22	3	Sky Sports
25	MF	Little	(England)	34	End of contract	Aldershot Town	Summer	n/a	8	0	BBC Sport
3	DF	Naysmith	(Scotland)	31	Free agent	Huddersfield Town	Summer	Free	88	0	Huddersfield Town F.C.
1	GK	Kenny	(Republic of Ireland)	32	Transfer	Queens Park Rangers	Summer	£750 000	318	0	Sheffield United
13	GK	Bennett	(England)	38	Transfer	Huddersfield Town	Summer	Free	29	0	BBC Sport
19	DF	Stewart	(England)	28	Free agent		Summer	Free	23	0	Sky Sport
24	FW	Sharp	(England)	24	Transfer	Doncaster Rovers	Summer	£1 100 000	65	12	Sky Sport
10	MF	Reid	(England)	22	Transfer	Charlton Athletic	Summer	Free	8	0	Kent Online
8	MF	Britton	(England)	28	Transfer	Swansea City (Wales)	Winter	Undisclosed	26	0	Sheffield United F.C.
2	DF	Jordan	(England)	29	Released			n/a	15	0	BBC Sport
29	GK	Wright	(England)	33	Released			n/a	2	0	BBC Sport

EU = if holds or not a European Union passport; Country: when 2 flags, 1st flag = country that plays for internationally, 2nd flag = country of birth; N = number on jersey; P = Position (for position name, pause mouse pointer on abbreviation); Name = Name on jersey (for more extensive name, pause mouse pointer on name); Age = age on the day of the signing; Moving from = only indicate the club the player was playing before start playing for this club in this season, for the type of the moving see Status column; Moving to = only indicates the club the player is going to play next, for the type of the moving see Status column; Ends = when the player's current contract ends; n/a = Not applicable; Apps = Total number of competitive appearances (including substitute appearances) at the club prior to departure; Goals = Total number of competitive goals scored at the club prior to departure.

=== Loans out ===
No.	Pos.	Name	Country	Age	Loan club	Started	Ended	Start source	End source
18	MF	Jamie Ward	(Northern Ireland)	24	Derby County	16 Feb		Derby Telegraph	

Sources: For loan start source see "Start source". For loan end source see "End source".
EU = if holds or not a European Union passport; Country: when 2 flags, 1st flag = country that plays for internationally, 2nd flag = country of birth; No. = number on jersey; P = Position (for position name, pause mouse pointer on abbreviation); Name = Name on jersey (for more extensive name, pause mouse pointer on name); In/Out = In: The player came in on loan, Out: The player went out on loan; Loan club = the club that the player moved on loan to or the club that the player came from on loan; Started = the date when the player's loan started; Ended = the date when the player's loan ended.

== Results ==
=== Championship ===
8 August 2010	Cardiff City	1–1	Sheffield United	Cardiff City Stadium
13:00	Bothroyd 62'		Evans 24'; Lowton (red card) 35'	Attendance: 20,573

14 August 2010	Sheffield United	0–3	Queens Park Rangers	Bramall Lane
15:00			Ephraim 11'; Mackie 20'; Taarabt 23' (pen.)	Attendance: 22,651

22 August 2010	Middlesbrough	1–0	Sheffield United	Riverside Stadium
13:00	Boyd 52'			Attendance: 14,633

28 August 2010	Sheffield United	1–0	Preston North End	Bramall Lane
15:00	Calvé 74'			Attendance: 19,692

11 September 2010	Derby County	0–1	Sheffield United	Pride Park
15:00			Cresswell 15'	Attendance: 25,749

14 September 2010	Sheffield United	0–4	Scunthorpe United	Bramall Lane
19:45			Dagnall 33', 73'; Mirfin 63'; Woolford 90'	Attendance: 19,390

18 September 2010	Sheffield United	1–0	Portsmouth	Bramall Lane
15:00	Evans 77'			Attendance: 20,712

25 September 2010	Leeds United	1–0	Sheffield United	Elland Road
15:00	Johnson 83'; Snodgrass (red card) 89'		Ward (red card) 90'	Attendance: 33,622

28 September 2010	Nottingham Forest	1–1	Sheffield United	City Ground
19:45	McKenna 69'		Cresswell 6'	Attendance: 19,782

2 October 2010	Sheffield United	0–1	Watford	Bramall Lane
15:00			Sordell 16'	Attendance: 22,433

16 October 2010	Sheffield United	3–3	Burnley	Bramall Lane
15:00	Bogdanović 57'; Lowton 82'; Yeates 90'		Marney 49'; Eagles 54' (pen.); Rodriguez 90'	Attendance: 22,936

19 October 2010	Hull City	0–1	Sheffield United	KC Stadium
19:45			Yeates 53'	Attendance: 20,276

23 October 2010	Doncaster Rovers	2–0	Sheffield United	Keepmoat Stadium
15:00	Coppinger 33'; Sharp 42'			Attendance: 8,985

30 October 2010	Sheffield United	0–1	Coventry City	Bramall Lane
15:00			McSheffrey 23'	Attendance: 20,059

6 November 2010	Sheffield United	1–2	Ipswich Town	Bramall Lane
15:00	Quinn 29'		Priskin 6'; McAuley 40'	Attendance: 19,207

10 November 2010	Leicester City	2–2	Sheffield United	Walkers Stadium
19:45	Gallagher 8'; Howard 90' (pen.)		Yeates 29', 41'	Attendance: 20,445

13 November 2010	Millwall	0–1	Sheffield United	The Den
15:00			Reid 29'	Attendance: 11,312

20 November 2010	Sheffield United	3–2	Crystal Palace	Bramall Lane
15:00	Cresswell 39' (pen.); Evans 85'; Bogdanović 87' (pen.) (red card) 90'		Danns 18' (pen.); Vaughan 63'; Garvan (red card) 37'	Attendance: 20,240

27 November 2010	Bristol City	3–0	Sheffield United	Ashton Gate
15:00	Pitman 6' (pen.), 34' (pen.); McAllister 62'			Attendance: 13,376

11 December 2010	Barnsley	1–0	Sheffield United	Oakwell
15:00	Colace 37'			Attendance: 12,976

18 December 2010	Sheffield United	1–0	Swansea City	Bramall Lane
15:00	Evans 44'			Attendance: 17,496

26 December 2010	Sheffield United	2–3	Hull City	Bramall Lane
15:00	Evans 62', 73'		Simpson 3', 45' (pen.); Bullard 90'	Attendance: 22,688

28 December 2010	Norwich City	4–2	Sheffield United	Carrow Road
15:00	Nelson 20'; Hoolahan 64' (pen.), 84' (pen.), 90'		Reid 17'; Cresswell 29'; Quinn (red card) 90'	Attendance: 25,809

1 January 2011	Burnley	4–2	Sheffield United	Turf Moor
15:00	Eagles 29'; Iwelumo 45'; Rodriguez 45'; Thompson 85'		Yeates 9'; Evans 47' (pen.)	Attendance: 14,897

3 January 2011	Sheffield United	2–2	Doncaster Rovers	Bramall Lane
15:00	Bogdanović 86'; Kozluk 90'		Sharp 66', 74' (pen.); Guedes (red card) 58'	Attendance: 21,102

15 January 2011	Coventry City	0–0	Sheffield United	Ricoh Arena
15:00				Attendance: 14,854

22 January 2011	Sheffield United	1–2	Norwich City	Bramall Lane
15:00	Evans 69'		Crofts 61', 80'	Attendance: 20,725

1 February 2011	Sheffield United	0–1	Leicester City	Bramall Lane
19:45			King 4'	Attendance: 20,464

5 February 2011	Ipswich Town	3–0	Sheffield United	Portman Road
15:00	Delaney 29'; Norris 53'; Wickham 87'		Kozluk (red card) 88'; Williamson (red card) 89'	Attendance: 18,280

12 February 2011	Sheffield United	1–1	Millwall	Bramall Lane
15:00	Bogdanović 77' (pen.)		Lisbie 90'	Attendance: 19,793

15 February 2011	Sheffield United	1–1	Reading	Bramall Lane
19:45	Bogdanović 88'		Long 81'	Attendance: 19,271

19 February 2011	Crystal Palace	1–0	Sheffield United	Selhurst Park
15:00	Ambrose 69'			Attendance: 14,214

21 February 2011	Scunthorpe United	3–2	Sheffield United	Glanford Park
19:45	Garner 37', 44'; Miller 53'		6' Evans; 7' Cresswell	Attendance: 6,281

26 February 2011	Sheffield United	0–1	Derby County	Bramall Lane
15:00			27' Robinson	Attendance: 21,084

5 March 2011	Portsmouth	1–0	Sheffield United	Fratton Park
15:00	Hreiðarsson 24'			Attendance: 15,096

8 March 2011	Sheffield United	2–1	Nottingham Forest	Bramall Lane
19:45	Vokes 74'; Matthew Lowton 80'		Adebola 42'	Attendance: 20,547

12 March 2011	Watford	3–0	Sheffield United	Vicarage Road
15:00	Graham 10'; Taylor 57'; Jenkins 86'			Attendance: 12,441

19 March 2011	Sheffield United	2–0	Leeds United	Bramall Lane
15:00	Lichaj 55' (o.g.); Riise 74'			Attendance: 23,728

4 April 2011	Queens Park Rangers	3–0	Sheffield United	Loftus Road
19:45	Routledge 29', 66'; Faurlín 52'			Attendance: 14,535

9 April 2011	Sheffield United	1–2	Middlesbrough	Bramall Lane
15:00	Lowton 28'		Bates 18'; Emnes 89'	Attendance: 21,572

12 April 2011	Sheffield United	0–2	Cardiff City	Bramall Lane
19:45			Bellamy 21'; E-Thomas 71'	Attendance: 18,230

16 April 2011	Preston North End	3–1	Sheffield United	Deepdale
15:00	Treacy 55', 68'; Ellington 90'		Slew 72'	Attendance: 12,076

23 April 2011	Sheffield United	3–2	Bristol City	Bramall Lane
15:00	Williamson 40'; McAllister 43'; Maguire (red card) 59'; Slew 86'		Simonsen 10' (o.g.); Maynard (red card) 42'; Pitman 60' (pen.)	Attendance: 18,151

25 April 2011	Reading	2–3	Sheffield United	Madjeski Stadium
15:00	Hunt 9'; Robson-Kanu 20'		Henderson 30', 51'; Williamson 45+1'	Attendance: 19,165

30 April 2011	Sheffield United	2–2	Barnsley	Bramall Lane
15:00	Lowton 39'; Williamson 59'		Haynes 15', 84'	Attendance: 22,366

7 May 2011	Swansea City	4–0	Sheffield United	Liberty Stadium
12:00	Dobbie 30', 60'; Sinclair 55' (pen.); Britton 90'		Lowry (red card) 54'	Attendance: 17,584

=== FA Cup ===
8 January 2011 Round 3	Sheffield United	1–3	Aston Villa	Bramall Lane
15:00	Ward 48' (pen.)		Walker 9'; Albrighton 33'; Petrov 90'	Attendance: 16,888

=== League Cup ===
11 August 2010 Round 1	Hartlepool United	2–0	Sheffield United	Victoria Park
19:45	Brown 6'; Boyd 61' (pen.)			Attendance: 2,520
