= 2011–12 Sheffield United F.C. season =

Sheffield United
2011–12 season
- Chairman: Kevin McCabe (PLC Chairman); Christopher Steer (Football Club Chairman)
- Manager: Danny Wilson
- Stadium: Bramall Lane
- League One: 3rd (lost play-off final)
- FA Cup: fourth round
- League Cup: second round
- Football League Trophy: Quarter-final (North)
- Top goalscorer: League: Ched Evans (29); All: Ched Evans (35)
- Highest home attendance: 30,043 (vs. Stevenage)
- Lowest home attendance: League: 15,783 (vs. Colchester United); Cup: 5,692 (vs. Bradford City)
- Average home league attendance: 18,702
Home colours	Away colours

Sheffield United Football Club (known as the Blades) participated in League One, the third level of English football for the first time in 23 years having been relegated from the Championship at the end of the previous season. It was also their first appearance in both the Football League Trophy and the first round proper of the FA Cup for a similar length of time, as well as being the first season under new manager Danny Wilson. United began the season well, recording consistently sound results in Football League One and nearing the position required for an immediate return to the Championship. By the turn of the year, the squad was well positioned for promotion.

Reasonable progress was made in the cup competitions, reaching the second round of the League Cup, the fourth round of the FA Cup and the regional quarter finals of the Football League Trophy. With only a handful of games left to play in the league United looked set to finish in second place in the table, but in the aftermath of leading scorer Ched Evans being jailed, results declined, and United slipped to third place in the final week of the season. Although they reached the play-off final, the team were beaten on penalties by Huddersfield Town at Wembley Stadium, thus failing to achieve promotion and being destined to spend the following season in League One.

== Team kit ==
The team kit for the 2011–12 season was produced by Macron for the third successive year. The home kit consisted of the club's traditional red and white stripes and was based on the kit worn by the team in the early 1970s, chosen following a poll of fans the previous year. As the pre-season programme got under way the club also revealed a new all yellow away kit. By mid July the club announced that they had struck a joint sponsorship deal with cross-city rivals Sheffield Wednesday which would see both teams sponsored by the same two local companies. The Blades' home kit was sponsored by Westfield Health and the away kit by local car dealers Gilders Group (with Sheffield Wednesday's kit's having the reverse). The club later announced that a new secondary sponsor, Nexis, would appear on the back of the home shirts for the coming season.

== Season overview ==
=== Preseason ===
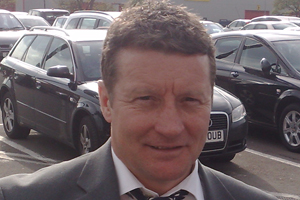
Danny Wilson who was appointed as Sheffield United manager in May 2011

Following relegation from the Championship at the end of the previous season, company chairman Kevin McCabe sacked manager Micky Adams, insisting that the club needed a new start to take them forward. After a few weeks of speculation, McCabe appointed former Sheffield Wednesday manager Danny Wilson as Adams' successor. Wilson began to assemble his back room team, appointing former United defender Frank Barlow as his number two, fellow former Blade Billy Dearden as chief scout and Dave Morrison as fitness coach.

Wilson stressed that he intended to bring a better style of play to the team in the coming season but admitted that players would have to be sold to balance the books. Deals were already in place to sell Jamie Ward to Derby County for an undisclosed fee, and sign Danny Philliskirk from Chelsea on a free transfer, but Wilson also added to the squad in June by signing Lecsinel Jean-François from his former club Swindon Town, also on a free transfer. After much speculation, and with the players about to return for pre-season training, Darius Henderson was sold to Millwall for an undisclosed fee in order to free up money on the wage bill.

The club announced a low-key series of friendlies for July, while Wilson continued to reshape his squad, allowing young defenders Kingsley James and Phil Roe, both products of the Blades Academy, to leave and rejoin former boss Micky Adams at Port Vale on free transfers. A youthful team were held to a draw by Sheffield but overcame Worksop Town a few days later. With the team about to leave for a training camp in Malta, Mark Yeates was sold to Watford for an undisclosed fee, Ryan Flynn was signed from Falkirk for a similarly undisclosed fee and Chris Porter arrived on a free transfer having been released by Derby County. Once in Malta, United took on local sides Sliema Wanderers and Hibernians in friendly games, beating both sides. Upon returning to England, the Blades completed their pre-season schedule with two home fixtures, losing to Doncaster Rovers and drawing with Blackpool. With their pre-season schedule completed the Blades signed young winger Nathaniel Mendez-Laing from Wolverhampton Wanderers on a six-month loan deal.

Unfortunately, the latter half of July also saw the club hit the national headlines for the wrong reasons. Firstly, the club was identified by a Channel 4 undercover investigation as being offered for sale as part of an illegal ownership deal, although the Blades themselves were not implicated in any wrongdoing. A fortnight later, striker Ched Evans was arrested and charged with rape following an incident in May.

=== August–September: Early season optimism ===
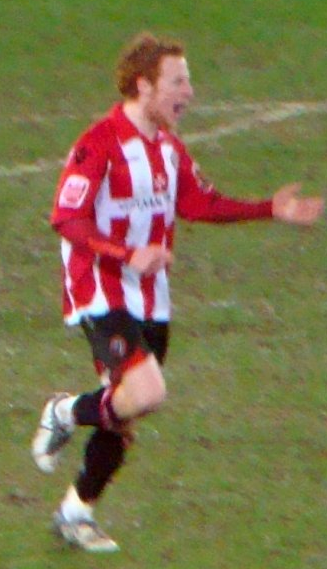
Stephen Quinn whose early season form won a number of 'League One Team of the Week' nominations

The Blades won the opening game of the season away from home, outclassing Oldham Athletic, but a strong side needed penalties to overcome Hartlepool United at Victoria Park in the first round of the League Cup a few days later. Midfielder Kevin McDonald was added to the squad on a free transfer after a lengthy trial period, before the Blades resumed their league campaign, beating Brentford at home, and overturning a two-nil deficit to overcome Walsall at Bramall Lane. Having spent the previous season on loan at United, Argentinian Elian Parrino returned to South Yorkshire on a one-year deal from Estudiantes de La Plata, after which the Blades embarked on a four match run of away games in the space of eleven days. They dropped their first league points of the season as they were held to a draw by Tranmere Rovers, before suffering their first defeat of the season on a quick return to Merseyside, allowing the lead to slip once more as they crashed out of the League Cup at the hands of Premiership Everton. The team returned to league action and winning ways with an away trip to Yeovil, the first ever competitive meeting between the two clubs, after which they despatched Burton Albion to progress into the second round of the Football League Trophy.

With Danny Wilson still needing to raise money and trim the wage bill, the Blades had a relatively busy transfer deadline day, allowing Jordan Slew to join Blackburn Rovers for £1.1m, and Daniel Bogdanović to join Blackpool for an undisclosed fee, but turning down another offer from the Seasiders for Stephen Quinn. The Blades also agreed a deal to take two young midfielders, John Fleck and Kyle Hutton, on loan from Rangers for the remainder of the season, but the deal subsequently fell through due to issues with the paperwork involved. The team kicked off September by crushing Bury 4–0 at Bramall Lane, and then travelled to Scunthorpe United where they maintained their unbeaten start after coming from behind to grab a 1–1 draw. Off the field the restructuring of the club continued with the appointment of former Blades player Julian Winter as Chief Executive to replace the departing Trevor Birch. Danny Wilson added to his defensive options by signing Marcus Williams on a months loan from Reading, with the defender making his début only hours later, although he was unable to prevent the Blades from crashing to their first league defeat of the season as they were trounced 3–0 at home by Huddersfield Town. Despite this setback the Blades quickly returned to winning ways, reversing the previous scoreline to crush Colchester United 3–0 at Bramall Lane. The month ended on a low note however as the team suffered a shock defeat at struggling Wycombe Wanderers, although they still managed to hold onto second place in the table.

=== October–November: Important points dropped ===
October started no better for the Blades as they were easily beaten 2–0 at home by league leaders Charlton Athletic and needed a last second goal to progress in the Football League Trophy as they struggled against League Two side Rotherham United. Meanwhile, Danny Wilson boosted his squad ahead of the Steel City derby, with Marcus Williams agreeing to stay on loan for a further two months and Matt Phillips and Billy Clarke arriving for a month each from Blackpool. The new arrivals failed to halt the disappointing run of results however as the Blades let a 2–0 lead slip to end up drawing with their cross–city rivals. Despite this disappointment the team bounced back to score an emphatic away win at Preston a few days later with both new signing Matt Phillips and old hand Lee Williamson netting two goals apiece. With increased competition for first team places, youngsters Danny Philliskirk and Corey Gregory were allowed to go out on loan to Oxford United and Hucknall Town respectively; swiftly followed by Connor Brown who joined Eastwood Town on a months deal. Back in the league, the disappointing results continued as United threw away a lead once again, allowing ten-men Leyton Orient to snatch a draw with the last kick of the game. Once again the Blades quickly responded to the setback by beating fellow promotion rivals MK Dons 2–1 at Bramall Lane, but then conspired to throw away yet more points, allowing Exeter City to come from behind twice in the closing minutes of the next game to snatch a 4–4 draw.

Into November and back on the road, yet another late goal was handed Stevenage all three points, leaving United fifth in the table going into FA Cup week. With Phillips and Clarke playing the final game of their loan spell, United tamely exited the Football League Trophy, losing on penalties to League Two strugglers Bradford City. There was a more positive result in the FA Cup however as a brace from Ched Evans helped the Blades ease past Oxford United. By mid–November, and with Danny Wilson still seeking to add to his attacking options, it was reported that former striker and fans favourite James Beattie had returned to training with the club and could be handed a contract depending on match fitness, and a short term deal was duly signed a few days later. Back in League action United saw out a victory over Carlisle United despite seeing a Richard Cresswell spot–kick saved in the second half, and a week later Ched Evans scored his fifth goal in four games to beat Chesterfield by the same scoreline. The month ended on a sombre note however as former player and manager Gary Speed was found dead at his home after having taken his own life less than a year after leaving his post at Bramall Lane.

=== December–January: Maximum points for Christmas ===
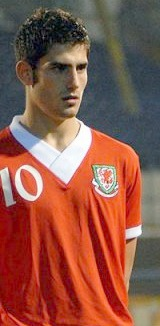
Ched Evans (pictured playing for Wales) who scored 35 goals during the season.

December started with the second round of the FA Cup and despite conceding another late goal, the Blades progressed into the third round at the expense of Torquay United, thanks to another brace from in Ched Evans, who then scored for the fifth game in succession in the next game, netting twice more in a league victory over Rochdale. The team's impressive form continued with an away win at Bournemouth thanks to two own goals, Notts County making a similar gift of an own goal to contribute to their own defeat on Boxing Day, before the Blades rounded the year off by crushing Hartlepool United on New Year's Eve; meaning that the Blades ended 2011 in second place in the table following eight victories in a row in all competitions.

With the transfer window reopening in January, Danny Wilson's first signing was the return of former loan player Marcus Williams who agreed a two-and-a-half-year deal. The New Year started disappointingly as the Blades crashed to their first defeat since the beginning of November as they were beaten 3–2 at Carlisle United. Following Danny Wilson being awarded 'League One Manager of the Month' for December, United soon got back to winning ways when they returned to home soil. The team saw off Salisbury City 3–1 in the third round of the FA Cup, the first meeting ever between the two clubs, and then outclassed Yeovil Town a few days later, hitting four without reply including a brace from Lee Williamson and a first ever club goal from captain Michael Doyle. With Danny Wilson looking to freshen up his squad United rewarded four of its younger players with contract extensions, with Erik Tønne and David McAllister set to remain with the club until the summer of 2014, and youth team players Jordan Chapell and Jack Adams agreeing new deals until the end of the season. In a busy day the club saw the departure of Elian Parrino as his short term deal came to an end, and then allowed McAllister to join League Two club Shrewsbury Town on a months loan, with manager Danny Wilson bemoaning a lack of reserve games under the current system. The following week Wilson continued to overhaul the squad with reserve keeper Mihkel Aksalu leaving the club on mutual terms, but was boosted by 'fans favourite' James Beattie agreeing a deal to remain at Bramall Lane until the end of the season. Meanwhile, back in the league the Blades then continued their fine run of form, completing their second league double of the week, as they hit three without reply away at Bury, but that form deserted them for a top-of-the-table trip to Charlton Athletic where a bad tempered match resulted in both teams being reduced to ten men and a 1–0 loss for United. Seven days later United suffered their first back-to-back defeats of the season as they crashed out of the FA Cup at the hands of Birmingham City. With the transfer window about to close Bramall Lane was relatively quite on deadline day; Danny Philliskirk was handed an extended deal, and striker Will Hoskins signed on loan from Brighton & Hove Albion until the end of the season, whilst youngster Erik Tønne was allowed to join Yorkshire neighbours York City, also until the end of the season. The club also gave a trial to experienced Scottish defender David Weir with a view to a potential short term contract.

=== February–March: Promotion charge takes shape then falls apart ===
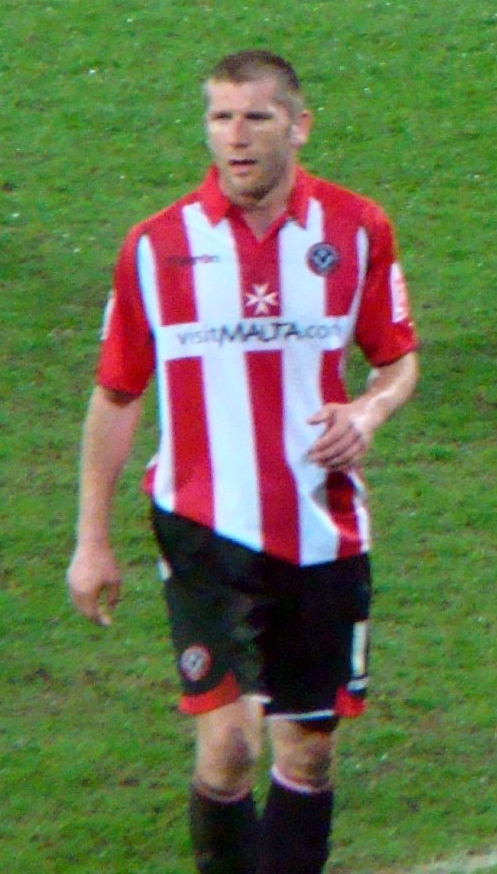
Richard Cresswell played 51 games for the Blades during the course of the season

After various match postponements due to a spell of bad weather and the various cup competitions United finally returned to league action in mid February with new signing Hoskins scoring on his début as the Blades ran out 3–0 victors over Wycombe Wanderers. After a successful spell, midfielder David McAllister opted to extend his loan deal at Shrewsbury until the end of March, whilst young keeper George Long agreed a new long–term deal at Bramall Lane. Meanwhile, on Valentine's Day, the Blades beat Yorkshire and promotion rivals Huddersfield Town 1–0 at the Galpharm Stadium as defender Neill Collins scored his first ever goal for the club, before coming from behind to beat Preston North End at home a few days later, despite Ched Evans missing a penalty. With Mihkel Aksalu having departed, United agreed a two-and-a-half-year deal with keeper, and free agent, Mark Howard to provide cover for Steve Simonsen, before the club met their cross-city rivals in the second Steel City derby of the season where United suffered a narrow defeat. Looking for a quick bounce–back, United were forced to come from behind to beat Scunthorpe United at home, to leave them in second place, five points clear of third, in the table at the start of March.

Despite their form, United suffered a catastrophic start to March as they lost at home to Oldham Athletic having had a two-goal lead only to see both Matthew Lowton and Harry Maguire sent off and the team subsequently collapse. With the entire back four unavailable, United were forced to draft in Matt Hill and John Egan on emergency loans, but this was not enough to prevent them slipping to their third defeat in four games as they capitulated at Walsall. Danny Wilson remained keen to find first team experience for the younger members of the squad and as such allowed Seamus Conneely to join Alfreton Town on loan before United returned to winning ways with two goals from Ched Evans being enough to defeat Brentford at Griffin Park. Unfortunately the Blades failed to take advantage of their game in hand, being held to a draw by Colchester United, before once again allowing a lead to slip as they drew with Tranmere Rovers at Bramall Lane. With the transfer deadline for loans approaching, the Blades' longest serving player and vice-captain Nick Montgomery was allowed to join Millwall until the end of the season due to an absence of first team football, allowing Danny Wilson to bring in winger Michael O'Halloran on loan from Bolton Wanderers. Meanwhile, on the pitch, United put their recent poor form behind them as they outclassed Notts County 5–2 at Meadow Lane, before putting four goals past Chesterfield at Bramall Lane, including a hat–trick from in–form striker Ched Evans. Despite a low–key team performance, a second Ched Evans penalty in as many games was enough to finish the month with a third straight victory, with the Blades defeating Hartlepool United at Victoria Park.

=== April–May: The final straight ends in disappointment ===
With loan defender John Egan returning to his parent club at the start of April, Nick Montgomery's loan at Millwall was all but cut short after only two substitute appearances when he sustained a calf injury likely to sideline him until the end of the season. David McAllister also saw his loan spell at Shrewsbury cut short shortly after receiving a red card, with the resulting three game ban ruling him out for the remainder of his time at the New Meadow. Back in the league a nervy display saw the Blades edge out Bournemouth at Bramall Lane, before a much more emphatic performance saw them bury Rochdale at the Spotland Stadium. With the Blades now in a straight fight with local rivals Sheffield Wednesday for the second automatic promotion spot they came from behind to beat Leyton Orient at Bramall Lane to open up a four-point gap on third placed Wednesday. The next week however their campaign was dealt a crushing blow as star striker and top scorer Ched Evans's case came to trial where he was found guilty of rape and sentenced to five years in prison. Without Evans and missing his injured strike partner Richard Cresswell, United slipped to a damaging defeat at MK Dons. Worse was to come as United could only register a draw with Stevenage in a dramatic final home game at Bramall Lane, meaning they slipped out of the automatic promotion places for the first time since February. United went into the final league fixture with Exeter City requiring to win and hope that rivals Sheffield Wednesday were beaten to secure promotion; a combination that failed to materialise as Wednesday registered a victory and the Blades could only draw meaning they were consigned to the play-offs.

=== Another trip to Wembley ===
With James Beattie unavailable for the playoffs following a red card in the final game of the season against Exeter City, manager Danny Wilson was faced with a selection crisis ahead of the critical games against Stevenage. With only one senior striker available a patched up side contested a dour first-leg where neither team created many chances. United did manage to keep a clean sheet however and took the tie back to Bramall Lane with the scores level at 0–0.

The Blades entered the second leg still bereft of forwards, with Richard Cresswell having contracted an illness on the morning of the game, so were forced to play with just Chris Porter as a lone striker once more. An even first half saw few opportunities for either side but following the break United began to attack with more purpose. Despite chances for both sides the game looked to be heading for another draw until Porter scored an 85th-minute winner to put the Blades through to the final at Wembley.

Richard Cresswell was passed fit for the final against Huddersfield but influential midfielder Kevin McDonald was left out through injury so the Blades were forced to make changes once more. The game was played under blistering heat and neither side created many chances. It remained 0–0 after ninety minutes and so extra–time was played but there was still no breakthrough. Ultimately the game went to penalties, which saw every player for both sides take a spot kick only for United to lose 8–7 when goalkeeper Steve Simonsen missed the final kick, consigning the Blades to another season in League One.

=== Academy and Reserve teams ===
==== Reserves ====
Central Division – Table
	Team	Pts
1.	Sheffield United	22
2.	Derby County	21
3.	Nottingham Forest	18
4.	Port Vale	15
5.	Walsall	15
6.	Burton Albion	13
7.	Stoke City	12

Sheffield United Reserves played in the Central League: Central Division in the nearby Derbyshire town of Dronfield at the Coach and Horses ground, which was also the home of Sheffield FC during the season. Experienced defender Chris Morgan was appointed reserve team coach at the start of the season and given the responsibility of developing the young players which made up the bulk of the side. With many teams now opting not to enter a reserve side into an organised competition the Central Division consisted of just seven sides meaning fixtures were irregular throughout the season. In January 2012 Danny Wilson expressed the need to reform the reserve team structure due to this infrequent number of matches citing that experienced players do not gain much from them and the cost of staging the fixtures as issues.

Despite this United's side ended the season as Champions, finishing one point ahead of nearest rivals Derby County who had won the division in the previous season, ironically by one point from The Blades who had finished second. Following a nine match unbeaten run the title was clinched with the final game of the season as United held a strong Nottingham Forest side to a 1–1 draw at the coach and Horses ground. Danny Philliskirk ended the season as top scorer, having netted six goals, whilst he was also the joint leading appearance maker along with Matty Harriott and Shane Murray.

==== Academy ====
Sheffield United Academy U18s played in the FA Premier Academy League U18s Group D at the Shirecliffe ground at Firshill Crescent. Under the management of John Pemberton, the side were seeking to replicate the success of the previous season when they had reached the final of the FA Youth Cup final. Shorn of a number of key players (who had either graduated to the first team or left the club), the team completed a solid but unspectacular season. Results fluctuated with impressive victories over the likes of Everton, Bolton and Sunderland being mixed with heavy defeats to Leeds United, Coventry City and West Ham United. Eventually finishing fifth (out of ten teams) in their division, manager John Pemberton described the season as "another successful one for everyone associated with the Academy. We have five players becoming professionals who will all be linking up with the first team next season and that is what we are judged on – producing players."

United's hopes of repeating the previous season's success in the FA Youth Cup did not come to fruition however. After a victory in the first round over Tranmere Rovers, they required penalties to see off Port Vale in the next round before finally being eliminated in round three when Southampton recorded a 7–0 victory over the Blades.

== Players ==
As of the end of the season

=== First-team squad ===
Squad at end of season

Note: Flags indicate national team as defined under FIFA eligibility rules; some limited exceptions apply. Players may hold more than one non-FIFA nationality.

No.	Pos.	Nation	Player
1	GK	ENG	Steve Simonsen
2	DF	ENG	Matthew Lowton
3	DF	HAI	Lecsinel Jean-François (Note: Jean-François was born in Cayenne, French Guiana, but also qualified to represent Haiti internationally through his parents and made his international debut for Haiti in 2008.)
4	MF	SCO	Nick Montgomery (Note: Montgomery was born in Leeds, England, but also qualified to represent Scotland internationally and represented them at U-21 level.)
5	DF	ENG	Chris Morgan (captain)
6	DF	AUT	Johannes Ertl
8	MF	IRL	Michael Doyle (vice captain)
10	FW	ENG	James Beattie
11	MF	SCO	Ryan Flynn
13	GK	ENG	Mark Howard
14	MF	JAM	Lee Williamson (Note: Williamson was born in Derby, England, but also qualified to represent Jamaica internationally and was called up by Jamaica in 2008 before making his international debut in September 2015.)
15	DF	SCO	Neill Collins
16	DF	ENG	Andy Taylor
17	FW	ENG	Richard Cresswell
18	MF	IRL	Matthew Harriott (Note: Harriott was born in Luton, England, but also qualified to represent the Republic of Ireland internationally and represented them at U-19 level.)

No.	Pos.	Nation	Player
19	DF	ENG	Harry Maguire
20	MF	IRL	David McAllister
21	FW	ENG	Chris Porter
22	FW	ENG	Danny Philliskirk
25	GK	ENG	George Long
26	DF	IRL	John Egan (on loan from Sunderland)
27	MF	SCO	Kevin McDonald
28	MF	IRL	Stephen Quinn
29	FW	SCO	Michael O'Halloran (on loan from Bolton Wanderers)
30	DF	ENG	Marcus Williams
31	FW	ENG	Jordan Chapell
32	DF	ENG	Matt Hill (on loan from Blackpool)
35	DF	AUS	Marc Warren
—	DF	ENG	Terry Kennedy

=== Out on loan ===
Note: Flags indicate national team as defined under FIFA eligibility rules; some limited exceptions apply. Players may hold more than one non-FIFA nationality.

No. / Pos. / Nation / Player; 23 / DF / IRL / Seamus Conneely (Note: Conneely was born in Lambeth, England, but also qualified to represent the Republic of Ireland internationally and represented them at U-21 and U-23 level.) (on loan to Alfreton Town)	No. / Pos. / Nation / Player; 24 / MF / NOR / Erik Tønne (on loan to York City)

=== Left club during season ===
Note: Flags indicate national team as defined under FIFA eligibility rules; some limited exceptions apply. Players may hold more than one non-FIFA nationality.

No.	Pos.	Nation	Player
7	MF	ENG	Nathaniel Mendez-Laing (on loan from Wolverhampton Wanderers)
7	FW	ENG	Will Hoskins (on loan from Brighton & Hove Albion)
9	FW	WAL	Ched Evans (released)
10	FW	MLT	Daniel Bogdanović (Note: Bogdanović was born in Misrata, Libya, but also qualified to represent Malta and made his international debut for Malta in February 2002.) (to Blackpool)
12	FW	ENG	Jordan Slew (to Blackburn Rovers)

No.	Pos.	Nation	Player
13	GK	EST	Mihkel Aksalu (released)
26	FW	IRL	Billy Clarke (on loan from Blackpool)
32	MF	SCO	Matt Phillips (on loan from Blackpool)
33	DF	ARG	Elian Parrino (released)

== Transfers and contracts ==
=== In ===
==== Summer ====
Squad #	Position	Player	Transferred from	Fee	Date	Source
3	DF	(Haiti) Lecsinel Jean-François	(England) Swindon Town	Free	20 June 2011	
22	FW	(England) Danny Philliskirk	(England) Chelsea	Free	21 June 2011	
11	MF	(Scotland) Ryan Flynn	(Scotland) Falkirk	Undisclosed	14 July 2011	
21	FW	(England) Chris Porter	(England) Derby County	Free	15 July 2011	
27	MF	(Scotland) Kevin McDonald	(England) Burnley	Free	13 August 2011	
33	DF	(Argentina) Elian Parrino	(Argentina) Estudiantes de La Plata	Undisclosed	18 August 2011	

==== Winter ====
Squad #	Position	Player	Transferred from	Fee	Date	Source
10	FW	(England) James Beattie	Free agent	Free	24 November 2011	
30	DF	(England) Marcus Williams	(England) Reading	Free	1 January 2012	
13	GK	(England) Mark Howard	Free agent	Free	20 February 2012	

==== Loan in ====
Squad #	Position	Player	Loaned from	Start	End	Source
7	MF	(England) Nathaniel Mendez-Laing	(England) Wolverhampton Wanderers	5 August 2011	3 January 2012	
30	DF	(England) Marcus Williams	(England) Reading	13 September 2011	13 December 2011	
26	FW	(Republic of Ireland) Billy Clarke	(England) Blackpool	14 October 2011	8 November 2011	
32	MF	(Scotland) Matt Phillips	(England) Blackpool	14 October 2011	8 November 2011	
7	FW	(England) Will Hoskins	(England) Brighton & Hove Albion	31 January 2012	31 May 2012	
26	DF	(Republic of Ireland) John Egan	(England) Sunderland	6 March 2012	3 April 2012	
32	DF	(England) Matt Hill	(England) Blackpool	6 March 2012	31 May 2012	
29	FW	(Scotland) Michael O'Halloran	(England) Bolton Wanderers	22 March 2012	31 May 2012	

=== Out ===
==== Summer ====
Squad #	Position	Player	Transferred to	Fee	Date	Source
18	FW	(Northern Ireland) Jamie Ward (Note: Ward was born in Birmingham, England, but also qualified to represent Northern Ireland internationally through his grandfather and represented them at U-18 and U-21 level before making his international debut for Northern Ireland in August 2011.)	(England) Derby County	Undisclosed	9 May 2011	
7	FW	(England) Darius Henderson	(England) Millwall	Undisclosed	29 June 2011	
15	MF	(England) Ryan France	Free agent	Contract Expired	30 June 2011	
22	DF	(England) Rob Kozluk	(England) Port Vale	Contract Expired	30 June 2011	
39	GK	(Australia) Lawrence Thomas	(Australia) Melbourne Victory	Contract Expired	30 June 2011	
30	MF	(England) Kingsley James	(England) Port Vale	Free	1 July 2011	
32	DF	(England) Phil Roe	(England) Port Vale	Free	1 July 2011	
11	MF	(Republic of Ireland) Mark Yeates	(England) Watford	Undisclosed	13 July 2011	
10	FW	(Malta) Daniel Bogdanović	(England) Blackpool	Undisclosed	31 August 2011	
12	FW	(England) Jordan Slew	(England) Blackburn Rovers	£1.1 million	31 August 2011	

==== Winter ====
Squad #	Position	Player	Transferred to	Fee	Date	Source
–	MF	(Norway) Kristoffer Løkberg	(Norway) Ranheim	Free	1 December 2011	
33	DF	(Argentina) Elian Parrino		Released	12 January 2012	
13	GK	(Estonia) Mihkel Aksalu		Released	19 January 2012	

==== Loan out ====
Squad #	Position	Player	Loaned to	Start	End	Source
–	MF	(Norway) Kristoffer Løkberg	(Norway) Ranheim	31 August 2011	1 December 2011	
22	FW	(England) Danny Philliskirk	(England) Oxford United	21 October 2011	19 November 2011	
–	MF	(England) Corey Gregory	(England) Hucknall Town	21 October 2011	31 January 2012	
–	DF	(England) Connor Brown	(England) Eastwood Town	21 October 2011	19 November 2011	
20	MF	(Republic of Ireland) David McAllister	(England) Shrewsbury Town	12 January 2012	4 April 2012	
24	MF	(Norway) Erik Tønne	(England) York City	31 January 2012	31 May 2012	
18	MF	(Republic of Ireland) Matthew Harriott	(England) Burton Albion	6 March 2012	24 March 2012	
18	DF	(Republic of Ireland) Seamus Conneely	(England) Alfreton Town	9 March 2012	9 April 2012	
4	MF	(Scotland) Nick Montgomery	(England) Millwall	19 March 2012	28 March 2012	

=== Contracts ===
New contracts and contract extensions.

Player	Date	Length	Contracted until	Reference
(England) Jordan Slew	15 July 2011	2 Years	Summer 2013	
(England) Matthew Lowton	11 August 2011	3 Years	Summer 2014	
(England) Harry Maguire	19 October 2011	4 Years	Summer 2015	
(Republic of Ireland) David McAllister	12 January 2012	2 Years, 6 Months	Summer 2014	
(Norway) Erik Tønne	12 January 2012	2 Years, 6 Months	Summer 2014	
(England) Jordan Chapell	12 January 2012	6 Months	Summer 2012	
(England) Jack Adams	12 January 2012	6 Months	Summer 2012	
(England) James Beattie	26 January 2012	6 Months	Summer 2012	
(England) Danny Philliskirk	30 January 2012	1 Year, 6 Months	Summer 2013	
(England) George Long	16 February 2012	4 Years	Summer 2016	
(Republic of Ireland) Aaron Barry	14 March 2012	1 Year	Summer 2013	

== League table ==
Pos	Team	Pld	W	D	L	GF	GA	GD	Pts	Promotion, qualification or relegation
1	Charlton Athletic (C, P)	46	30	11	5	82	36	+46	101	Promotion to Football League Championship
2	Sheffield Wednesday (P)	46	28	9	9	81	48	+33	93	Promotion to Football League Championship
3	Sheffield United	46	27	9	10	92	51	+41	90	Qualification for League One play-offs (Note: Four teams play for one spot and promotion to Football League Championship.)
4	Huddersfield Town (O, P)	46	21	18	7	79	47	+32	81	Qualification for League One play-offs
5	Milton Keynes Dons	46	22	14	10	84	47	+37	80	Qualification for League One play-offs

Updated to match(es) played on 5 May 2012. Source: BBC Sport
Rules for classification: 1) Points; 2) Goal difference; 3) Number of goals scored
(C) Champions; (O) Play-off winners; (P) Promoted

== Season firsts ==
=== Player début ===
Players making their first team Sheffield United début in a fully competitive match.

Squad #	Position	Player	Date	Opponents	Ground	Notes
11	MF	(Scotland) Ryan Flynn	6 August 2011	Oldham Athletic	Boundary Park	
2	DF	(Haiti) Lecsinel Jean-François	6 August 2011	Oldham Athletic	Boundary Park	
21	FW	(England) Chris Porter	6 August 2011	Oldham Athletic	Boundary Park	
7	MF	(England) Nathaniel Mendez-Laing	9 August 2011	Hartlepool United	Victoria Park	On loan, League Cup
27	MF	(Scotland) Kevin McDonald	13 August 2011	Brentford	Bramall Lane	
30	DF	(England) Marcus Williams	13 September 2011	Huddersfield Town	Bramall Lane	On loan
32	MF	(Scotland) Matt Phillips	16 October 2011	Sheffield Wednesday	Bramall Lane	Sub, On loan
26	FW	(Republic of Ireland) Billy Clarke	19 October 2011	Preston North End	Deepdale	On loan
7	FW	(England) Will Hoskins	11 February 2012	Wycombe Wanderers	Bramall Lane	Sub, On loan
26	DF	(Republic of Ireland) John Egan	6 March 2012	Walsall	Bescot Stadium	On loan
32	DF	(England) Matt Hill	6 March 2012	Walsall	Bescot Stadium	On loan
29	FW	(Scotland) Michael O'Halloran	28 March 2012	Chesterfield	Bramall Lane	Sub, On loan

=== Début goal ===
Players scoring their first goal for Sheffield United in a competitive fixture.

Squad #	Position	Player	Date	Opponents	Ground	Notes
19	DF	(England) Harry Maguire	6 August 2011	Oldham Athletic	Boundary Park	
21	FW	(England) Chris Porter	27 August 2011	Yeovil Town	Huish Park	
27	MF	(Norway) Erik Tønne	30 August 2011	Burton Albion	Pirelli Stadium	Football League Trophy
7	MF	(England) Nathaniel Mendez-Laing	3 September 2011	Bury	Bramall Lane	
32	MF	(Scotland) Matt Phillips	19 October 2011	Preston North End	Deepdale	
26	FW	(Republic of Ireland) Billy Clarke	29 October 2011	Exeter City	Bramall Lane	
11	MF	(Scotland) Ryan Flynn	19 November 2011	Oxford United	Bramall Lane	FA Cup
8	MF	(Republic of Ireland) Michael Doyle	10 January 2012	Yeovil Town	Bramall Lane	
7	FW	(England) Will Hoskins	11 February 2012	Wycombe Wanderers	Bramall Lane	
27	MF	(Scotland) Kevin McDonald	11 February 2012	Wycombe Wanderers	Bramall Lane	
15	DF	(Scotland) Neill Collins	14 February 2012	Huddersfield Town	Galpharm Stadium	

=== Competitive fixture ===
First ever meeting of the two clubs in a competitive fixture.

Opposition	Date	Venue	Result	Score	Notes
Yeovil Town	27 August 2011	Huish Park	Win	0–1	
Burton Albion	30 August 2011	Pirelli Stadium	Win	1–2	Football League Trophy
Stevenage	5 November 2011	The Lamex Stadium	Loss	2–1	
Salisbury City	7 January 2012	Bramall Lane	Win	3–1	FA Cup

=== Stadia ===
First ever visit to a stadium for a competitive fixture

Venue	Opposition	Date	Result	Score	Notes
Huish Park	Yeovil Town	27 August 2011	Win	0–1	
Pirelli Stadium	Burton Albion	30 August 2011	Win	1–2	Football League Trophy
Adams Park	Wycombe Wanderers	24 September 2011	Loss	1–0	
Don Valley Stadium	Rotherham United	4 October 2011	Win	1–2	Football League Trophy
The Lamex Stadium	Stevenage	5 November 2011	Loss	2–1	
B2net Stadium	Chesterfield	26 November 2011	Win	0–1	
Colchester Community Stadium	Colchester United	13 March 2012	Draw	1–1	
Stadium mk	Milton Keynes Dons	21 April 2012	Loss	1–0	

== Squad statistics ==
=== Appearances and goals ===
As of 26 May 2012

No.	Pos	Nat	Player	Total		League One / Play-offs		FA Cup		League Cup		FL Trophy	
No.	Pos	Nat	Player	Apps	Goals	Apps	Goals	Apps	Goals	Apps	Goals	Apps	Goals
1	GK	(England) ENG	Steve Simonsen	54	0	47+0	0	4+0	0	2+0	0	1+0	0
2	DF	(England) ENG	Matthew Lowton	55	6	47+0	6	3+0	0	2+0	0	2+1	0
3	DF	(Haiti) HAI	Lecsinel Jean-François	31	0	22+3	0	2+1	0	2+0	0	1+0	0
4	MF	(Scotland) SCO	Nick Montgomery	25	1	16+6	1	1+0	0	1+0	0	1+0	0
5	DF	(England) ENG	Chris Morgan	0	0	0+0	0	0+0	0	0+0	0	0+0	0
6	MF	(Austria) AUT	Johannes Ertl	9	0	2+6	0	1+0	0	0+0	0	0+0	0
8	MF	(Republic of Ireland) IRL	Michael Doyle	54	3	42+4	3	4+0	0	2+0	0	2+0	0
9	FW	(Wales) WAL	Ched Evans	43	35	30+6	29	4+0	5	0+0	0	2+1	1
10	FW	(England) ENG	James Beattie	19	0	2+16	0	0+1	0	0+0	0	0+0	0
11	MF	(Scotland) SCO	Ryan Flynn	34	4	16+12	3	1+2	1	1+0	0	2+0	0
13	GK	(England) ENG	Mark Howard	0	0	0+0	0	0+0	0	0+0	0	0+0	0
14	MF	(Jamaica) JAM	Lee Williamson	48	13	34+9	13	3+0	0	2+0	0	0+0	0
15	DF	(Scotland) SCO	Neill Collins	54	2	45+0	2	4+0	0	2+0	0	3+0	0
16	DF	(England) ENG	Andy Taylor	5	0	4+1	0	0+0	0	0+0	0	0+0	0
17	FW	(England) ENG	Richard Cresswell	51	10	33+11	9	3+1	0	2+0	1	1+0	0
18	MF	(Republic of Ireland) IRL	Matthew Harriott	2	0	0+0	0	0+0	0	1+0	0	0+1	0
19	DF	(England) ENG	Harry Maguire	56	1	47+0	1	4+0	0	2+0	0	3+0	0
20	MF	(Republic of Ireland) IRL	David McAllister	10	1	3+1	0	1+1	0	0+2	0	1+1	1
21	FW	(England) ENG	Chris Porter	45	8	20+17	6	1+2	1	0+1	0	3+1	1
22	FW	(England) ENG	Danny Philliskirk	3	0	0+0	0	0+0	0	0+1	0	1+1	0
23	MF	(Republic of Ireland) IRL	Seamus Conneely	0	0	0+0	0	0+0	0	0+0	0	0+0	0
24	MF	(Norway) NOR	Erik Tønne	4	2	0+2	1	0+0	0	0+0	0	0+2	1
25	GK	(England) ENG	George Long	4	0	2+0	0	0+0	0	0+0	0	2+0	0
27	MF	(Scotland) SCO	Kevin McDonald	38	3	32+1	3	2+1	0	0+0	0	2+0	0
28	MF	(Republic of Ireland) IRL	Stephen Quinn	53	4	46+2	3	3+0	0	2+0	1	0+0	0
29	FW	(Scotland) SCO	Michael O'Halloran	8	0	1+7	0	0+0	0	0+0	0	0+0	0
30	DF	(England) ENG	Marcus Williams	23	0	15+4	0	2+1	0	0+0	0	1+0	0
31	FW	(England) ENG	Jordan Chapell	1	0	0+0	0	0+1	0	0+0	0	0+0	0
32	DF	(England) ENG	Matt Hill	15	0	15+0	0	0+0	0	0+0	0	0+0	0
	DF	(England) ENG	Terry Kennedy	0	0	0+0	0	0+0	0	0+0	0	0+0	0
	DF	(Australia) AUS	Marc Warren	0	0	0+0	0	0+0	0	0+0	0	0+0	0
Players who left before the end of the season:
7	MF	(England) ENG	Nathaniel Mendez-Laing	11	1	4+4	1	0+0	0	1+0	0	1+1	0
7	FW	(England) ENG	Will Hoskins	12	2	4+8	2	0+0	0	0+0	0	0+0	0
10	FW	(Malta) MLT	Daniel Bogdanović	3	0	0+2	0	0+0	0	0+1	0	0+0	0
12	FW	(England) ENG	Jordan Slew	6	1	3+1	1	0+0	0	0+1	0	1+0	0
13	GK	(Estonia) EST	Mihkel Aksalu	0	0	0+0	0	0+0	0	0+0	0	0+0	0
26	FW	(Republic of Ireland) IRL	Billy Clarke	6	1	5+0	1	0+0	0	0+0	0	1+0	0
26	DF	(Republic of Ireland) IRL	John Egan	1	0	1+0	0	0+0	0	0+0	0	0+0	0
32	MF	(Scotland) SCO	Matt Phillips	7	6	5+1	5	0+0	0	0+0	0	1+0	1
33	DF	(Argentina) ARG	Elian Parrino	2	0	0+0	0	0+0	0	0+0	0	1+1	0

=== Top scorers ===
Place	Number	Nation	Position	Name	League One	Playoffs	FA Cup	League Cup	FL Trophy	Total
1	9	(Wales)	FW	Ched Evans	29	0	5	0	1	35
2	14	(Jamaica)	MF	Lee Williamson	13	0	0	0	0	13
3	17	(England)	FW	Richard Cresswell	9	0	0	1	0	10
4	21	(England)	FW	Chris Porter	5	1	1	0	1	8
5	2	(England)	DF	Matthew Lowton	6	0	0	0	0	6
5	32	(Scotland)	MF	Matt Phillips	5	0	0	0	1	6
6	28	(Republic of Ireland)	MF	Stephen Quinn	4	0	0	1	0	5
7	8	(Republic of Ireland)	MF	Michael Doyle	2	0	0	0	0	3
7	11	(Scotland)	MF	Ryan Flynn	2	0	1	0	0	3
7	27	(Scotland)	MF	Kevin McDonald	3	0	0	0	0	3
8	15	(Scotland)	DF	Neill Collins	2	0	0	0	0	2
8	7	(England)	FW	Will Hoskins	2	0	0	0	0	2
8	24	(Norway)	MF	Erik Tønne	1	0	0	0	1	2
9	26	(Republic of Ireland)	FW	Billy Clarke	1	0	0	0	0	1
9	19	(England)	DF	Harry Maguire	1	0	0	0	0	1
9	20	(Republic of Ireland)	MF	David McAllister	0	0	0	0	1	1
9	7	(England)	MF	Nathaniel Mendez-Laing	1	0	0	0	0	1
9	4	(Scotland)	MF	Nick Montgomery	1	0	0	0	0	1
9	12	(England)	FW	Jordan Slew	1	0	0	0	0	1
				TOTALS	82	1	7	2	5	99

Five additional own goals scored during the season, three in The Football League and two in the FA Cup.

=== Disciplinary record ===
Number	Nation	Position	Name	League One		Playoffs		FA Cup		League Cup		FL Trophy		Total	
Number	Nation	Position	Name	Yellow card	Red card	Yellow card	Red card	Yellow card	Red card	Yellow card	Red card	Yellow card	Red card	Yellow card	Red card
19	(England)	DF	Harry Maguire	5	1	1	0	0	0	0	0	0	0	6	1
14	(Jamaica)	MF	Lee Williamson	8	0	0	0	1	0	0	0	0	0	9	0
2	(England)	DF	Matthew Lowton	4	1	1	0	0	0	0	0	0	0	5	1
27	(Scotland)	MF	Kevin McDonald	4	0	0	0	2	0	0	0	2	0	8	0
28	(Republic of Ireland)	MF	Stephen Quinn	8	0	0	0	0	0	0	0	0	0	8	0
17	(England)	FW	Richard Cresswell	7	0	0	0	0	0	0	0	0	0	7	0
9	(Wales)	FW	Ched Evans	6	0	0	0	1	0	0	0	0	0	7	0
10	(England)	FW	James Beattie	0	2	0	0	0	0	0	0	0	0	0	2
8	(Republic of Ireland)	MF	Michael Doyle	6	0	0	0	0	0	0	0	0	0	6	0
3	(Haiti)	DF	Lecsinel Jean-François	5	0	0	0	0	0	1	0	0	0	6	0
15	(Scotland)	DF	Neill Collins	4	0	0	0	0	0	1	0	0	0	5	0
4	(Scotland)	MF	Nick Montgomery	3	0	0	0	0	0	0	0	0	0	3	0
1	(England)	GK	Steve Simonsen	3	0	0	0	0	0	0	0	0	0	3	0
11	(Scotland)	MF	Ryan Flynn	1	0	0	0	0	0	1	0	0	0	2	0
21	(England)	FW	Chris Porter	2	0	0	0	0	0	0	0	0	0	2	0
30	(England)	DF	Marcus Williams	2	0	0	0	0	0	0	0	0	0	2	0
32	(England)	DF	Matt Hill	1	0	0	0	0	0	0	0	0	0	1	0
20	(Republic of Ireland)	MF	David McAllister	1	0	0	0	0	0	0	0	0	0	1	0
28	(England)	FW	Jordan Slew	1	0	0	0	0	0	0	0	0	0	1	0
			TOTALS	69	4	2	0	4	0	3	0	2	0	79	4

==== Suspensions ====
Squad #	Position	Player	Suspension	Start date	Reason	Source
3	DF	(Haiti) Lecsinel Jean-François	1 game	10 September 2011	Five yellow cards to date	
14	MF	(Jamaica) Lee Williamson	1 game	17 December 2011	Five yellow cards to date	
17	FW	(England) Richard Cresswell	1 game	27 December 2011	Five yellow cards to date	
28	MF	(Republic of Ireland) Stephen Quinn	1 game	27 December 2011	Five yellow cards to date	
10	FW	(England) James Beattie	3 games	21 January 2012	Straight red card – violent conduct	
2	DF	(England) Matthew Lowton	1 game	3 March 2012	Two yellow cards	
19	DF	(England) Harry Maguire	1 game	3 March 2012	Straight red card	
10	FW	(England) James Beattie	4 games	5 May 2012	Straight red card (2nd of season)	

Date of start of suspension assumed to be the date of the game during which the disciplinary incident occurred.

=== International Call-ups ===
No.	P	Name	Squad	Competition	Opposition	Date	Cap	Goals	Notes
	GK	George Willis	England U17	2012 U17 European; Championship qualification	Latvia U17	26 October 2011	Y	0	
	GK	George Willis	England U17	2012 U17 European; Championship qualification	Bosnia and Herzegovina U17	28 October 2011	Y	0	
	GK	George Willis	England U17	2012 U17 European; Championship qualification	Netherlands U17	31 October 2011	N	0	Unused sub
3	DF	Lecsinel Jean-François	Haiti	2014 FIFA World Cup qualification	Antigua and Barbuda	11 November 2011	Y	0	
3	DF	Lecsinel Jean-François	Haiti	2014 FIFA World Cup qualification	Antigua and Barbuda	15 November 2011	Y	0	

== Matches ==
=== Key ===
Win Draw Loss

=== Football League One ===
6 August 2011	Oldham Athletic	0–2	Sheffield United	Boundary Park
15:00		(Report)	Maguire 48'; Cresswell 54'	Attendance: 8,032

13 August 2011	Sheffield United	2–0	Brentford	Bramall Lane
15:00	Slew 49'; Cresswell 70'	(Report)		Attendance: 17,769

16 August 2011	Sheffield United	3–2	Walsall	Bramall Lane
19:45	Lowton 59'; Williamson 68'; Cresswell 74' (pen.)	(Report)	Hurst 46'; Grigg 51'	Attendance: 16,443

20 August 2011	Tranmere Rovers	1–1	Sheffield United	Prenton Park
15:00	Labadie 80'	(Report)	Montgomery 44'	Attendance: 6,244

27 August 2011	Yeovil Town	0–1	Sheffield United	Huish Park
13:00	Haynes-Brown (yellow card) 90+7' (yellow-red card)	(Report)	Porter 41'	Attendance: 5,001

3 September 2011	Sheffield United	4–0	Bury	Bramall Lane
15:00	Porter 43'; Mendez-Laing 47'; Lowton 71'; Tønne 84'	(Report)		Attendance: 17,956

10 September 2011	Scunthorpe United	1–1	Sheffield United	Glanford Park
15:00	Dagnall 45+1'; Barcham (red card) 24'	(Report)	Evans 72'	Attendance: 6,042

13 September 2011	Sheffield United	0–3	Huddersfield Town	Bramall Lane
19:45		(Report)	Novak 20', 37'; Gobern 40'	Attendance: 17,373

17 September 2011	Sheffield United	3–0	Colchester United	Bramall Lane
15:00	Evans 3'; Porter 12'; Quinn 72'	(Report)		Attendance: 15,783

24 September 2011	Wycombe Wanderers	1–0	Sheffield United	Adams Park
15:00	Beavon 31'	(Report)		Attendance: 5,506

1 October 2011	Sheffield United	0–2	Charlton Athletic	Bramall Lane
15:00		(Report)	Kermorgant 65'; Wright-Phillips 67'	Attendance: 20,743

16 October 2011	Sheffield United	2–2	Sheffield Wednesday	Bramall Lane
12:00	Quinn 11'; Evans 20'	(Report)	O'Grady 82'; Madine 86'	Attendance: 28,136

19 October 2011	Preston North End	2–4	Sheffield United	Deepdale
19:45	Carlisle 29'; Hume 63'	(Report)	Phillips 4', 39'; Williamson 74', 87'	Attendance: 11,520

22 October 2011	Leyton Orient	1–1	Sheffield United	Matchroom Stadium
15:00	Lisbie 90+6'; Daniels (red card) 73'	(Report)	Porter 84'	Attendance: 5,928

25 October 2011	Sheffield United	2–1	Milton Keynes Dons	Bramall Lane
19:45	Cresswell 22'; Phillips 67'	(Report)	Gleeson 52'; Smith (yellow card) 84' (yellow-red card)	Attendance: 16,367

29 October 2011	Sheffield United	4–4	Exeter City	Bramall Lane
15:00	Phillips 45', 85'; Clarke 65'; Lowton 85'	(Report)	Nardiello 9'; Noble 23'; O'Flynn 82'; Dunne 86'	Attendance: 17,052

5 November 2011	Stevenage	2–1	Sheffield United	The Lamex Stadium
15:00	Roberts 42'; Laird 82' (pen.)	(Report)	Evans 68'	Attendance: 4,996

19 November 2011	Sheffield United	1–0	Carlisle United	Bramall Lane
15:00	Evans 21'	(Report)		Attendance: 16,840

26 November 2011	Chesterfield	0–1	Sheffield United	B2net Stadium
13:00		(Report)	Evans 82'	Attendance: 9,259

10 December 2011	Sheffield United	3–0	Rochdale	Bramall Lane
15:00	Evans 39', 64'; Cresswell 57'	(Report)		Attendance: 15,892

17 December 2011	Bournemouth	0–2	Sheffield United	Dean Court
15:00		(Report)	Barrett 5' (o.g.); Cook 77' (o.g.)	Attendance: 7,260

26 December 2011	Sheffield United	2–1	Notts County	Bramall Lane
14:15	Flynn 31'; Sheehan 51' (o.g.)	(Report)	Judge 17'; Demontagnac (red card) 90+4'	Attendance: 20,538

31 December 2011	Sheffield United	3–1	Hartlepool United	Bramall Lane
13:00	Flynn 12'; Porter 34'; Evans 42'	(Report)	Hartley 90+3'	Attendance: 20,372

2 January 2012	Carlisle United	3–2	Sheffield United	Brunton Park
15:00	Zoko 2', 15'; McGovern 71'	(Report)	Evans 7', 45+1'	Attendance: 7,721

10 January 2011	Sheffield United	4–0	Yeovil Town	Bramall Lane
19:45	Cresswell 18'; Doyle 36'; Williamson 48', 87'	(Report)		Attendance: 15,965

14 January 2012	Bury	0–3	Sheffield United	Gigg Lane
15:00		(Report)	Cresswell 54'; Evans 62'; Williamson 81'	Attendance: 6,970

21 January 2012	Charlton Athletic	1–0	Sheffield United	The Valley
15:00	Jackson 21'; Russell (red card) 85'	(Report)	Beattie (red card) 86'	Attendance: 20,992

11 February 2012	Sheffield United	3–0	Wycombe Wanderers	Bramall Lane
15:00	Hoskins 66'; Evans 73'; McDonald 90'	(Report)		Attendance: 17,165

14 February 2012	Huddersfield Town	0–1	Sheffield United	Galpharm Stadium
19:45		(Report)	Collins 5'	Attendance: 17,320

18 February 2012	Sheffield United	2–1	Preston North End	Bramall Lane
15:00	Evans 42', 53'	(Report)	Cummins 38'	Attendance: 17,579

26 February 2012	Sheffield Wednesday	1–0	Sheffield United	Hillsborough Stadium
13:00	O'Grady 73'	(Report)		Attendance: 36,364

29 February 2012	Sheffield United	2–1	Scunthorpe United	Bramall Lane
19:45	Williamson 54'; Quinn 82'	(Report)	Duffy 31'; Togwell (red card) 37'	Attendance: 16,165

3 March 2012	Sheffield United	2–3	Oldham Athletic	Bramall Lane
15:00	Lowton 22'; Evans 38'; Lowton (yellow card) 66' (yellow-red card); Maguire (red card) 90'	(Report)	Cresswell 65' (o.g.); Lee 69'; Kuqi 90' (pen.)	Attendance: 17,267

6 March 2012	Walsall	3–2	Sheffield United	Bescot Stadium
19:45	Mantom 55'; Macken 73'; Nicholls 81'	(Report)	Williamson 65'; Evans 76'	Attendance: 5,003

10 March 2012	Brentford	0–2	Sheffield United	Griffin Park
15:00		(Report)	Evans 6', 51'	Attendance: 7,414

13 March 2012	Colchester United	1–1	Sheffield United	Colchester Community Stadium
19:45	Gillespie 56'	(Report)	Hoskins 32'	Attendance: 4,572

17 March 2012	Sheffield United	1–1	Tranmere Rovers	Bramall Lane
15:00	Evans 32'	(Report)	Akins 54'	Attendance: 17,444

20 March 2012	Notts County	2–5	Sheffield United	Meadow Lane
19:45	Judge 77'; Bishop (yellow card) 80' (yellow-red card); Kelly 90+1'	(Report)	Quinn 16'; Evans 22'; Lowton 27'; Collins 45+1'; Williamson 89'	Attendance: 9,468

28 March 2012	Sheffield United	4–1	Chesterfield	Bramall lane
19:45	Williamson 38'; Evans 49' (pen.), 60', 63'	(Report)	Moussa 44'	Attendance: 20,159

31 March 2012	Hartlepool United	0–1	Sheffield United	Victoria Park
15:00	Hartley (yellow card) 84' (yellow-red card)	(Report)	Evans 79' (pen.)	Attendance: 5,825

7 April 2012	Sheffield United	2–1	Bournemouth	Bramall Lane
15:00	Evans 34'; Cresswell 50'	(Report)	Hines 67'	Attendance: 18,817

10 April 2012	Rochdale	2–5	Sheffield United	Spotland Stadium
19:45	Kennedy 3'; Obadeyi 68'	(Report)	McDonald 5'; Evans 22', 45+2'; Williamson 25'; Doyle 57'	Attendance: 5,309

14 April 2012	Sheffield United	3–1	Leyton Orient	Bramall Lane
15:00	Williamson 42'; Doyle 54'; Evans 83'	(Report)	Lisbie 12'	Attendance: 18,272

21 April 2012	Milton Keynes Dons	1–0	Sheffield United	Stadium mk
15:00	Smith 16'; Powell (yellow card) 66' (yellow-red card)	(Report)		Attendance: 15,938

28 April 2012	Sheffield United	2–2	Stevenage	Bramall Lane
17:20	Cresswell 63'; Lowton 85'	(Report)	Byrom 31'; Laird 47'	Attendance: 30,043

5 May 2012	Exeter City	2–2	Sheffield United	St James Park
15:00	Gow 24'; Bennett 90+4'	(Report)	Williamson 44'; McDonald 47'; Beattie (red card) 36'	Attendance: 6,045

=== Playoffs ===
11 May 2012 Semi Final (1st leg)	Stevenage	0–0	Sheffield United	Lamex Stadium
19:45		(Report)		Attendance: 5,802

14 May 2012 Semi Final (2nd leg)	Sheffield United	1–0	Stevenage	Bramall Lane
19:45	Porter 85'	(Report)		Attendance: 21,182

26 May 2012 Final	Huddersfield Town	0–0 (a.e.t.) (8–7 p)	Sheffield United	Wembley, London
15:00		(Report)		Attendance: 52,100
	Penalties
	Miller (penalty missed); Johnson (penalty missed); Lee (penalty missed); Clarke (penalty scored); Arfield (penalty scored); Rhodes (penalty scored); Roberts (penalty scored); Roberts (penalty scored); Hunt (penalty scored); Morrison (penalty scored); Smithies (penalty scored)		(penalty missed) Williamson; (penalty scored) Collins; (penalty missed) Lowton; (penalty missed) Taylor; (penalty scored) Porter; (penalty scored) Quinn; (penalty scored) Maguire; (penalty scored) Doyle; (penalty scored) O'Halloran; (penalty scored) Hill; (penalty missed) Simonsen

=== FA Cup ===
12 November 2011 Round 1	Sheffield United	3–0	Oxford United	Bramall Lane
15:00	Evans 12', 19'; Flynn 71'	(Report)		Attendance: 7,991

3 December 2011 Round 2	Sheffield United	3–2	Torquay United	Bramall Lane
15:00	Ellis 68' (o.g.); Evans 69', 78'	(Report)	Howe 3'; Stevens 90+4'	Attendance: 10,105

7 January 2012 Round 3	Sheffield United	3–1	Salisbury City	Bramall Lane
15:00	Porter 18'; Evans 60'; Webb 72' (o.g.)	(Report)	Macklin 86'	Attendance: 10,488

28 January 2012 Round 4	Sheffield United	0–4	Birmingham City	Bramall Lane
15:00		(Report)	Redmond 18'; Rooney 38', 78'; Elliott 58'	Attendance: 18,072

=== Football League Cup ===
9 August 2011 Round 1	Hartlepool United	1–1 (a.e.t.) (4–5 p)	Sheffield United	Victoria Park
19:30 (postponed to 19:45 due to power-cut)	Sweeney 80'	(Report)	Quinn 29'	Attendance: 2,774
	Penalties
	Horwood (penalty scored); Poole (penalty scored); Luscombe (penalty scored); S. Collins (penalty missed); Austin (penalty scored); Nish (penalty missed)		(penalty scored) Cresswell; (penalty scored) N. Collins; (penalty scored) Montgomery; (penalty missed) Quinn; (penalty scored) Lowton; (penalty scored) Pilliskirk

24 August 2011 Round 2	Everton	3–1	Sheffield United	Goodison Park
20:00	Cresswell 31' (o.g.); Anichebe 37'; Arteta 42'	(Report)	Cresswell 28'	Attendance: 17,173

=== Football League Trophy ===
30 August 2011 Round 1	Burton Albion	1–2	Sheffield United	Pirelli Stadium
19:30	Richards 73'	(Report)	McAllister 76'; Tønne 80'	Attendance: 2,725

4 October 2011 Round 2	Rotherham United	1–2	Sheffield United	Don Valley Stadium, Sheffield
19:45	Revell 69'	(Report)	Porter 9'; Evans 90+7'	Attendance: 6,737

8 November 2011 Quarter Final	Sheffield United	1–1 (5–6 p)	Bradford City	Bramall Lane
19:45	Phillips 27'	(Report)	M. Flynn 40'	Attendance: 5,692
	Penalties
	Porter (penalty missed); Collins (penalty scored); Phillips (penalty scored); Lowton (penalty scored); Doyle (penalty scored); Maguire (penalty missed); McDonald (penalty scored); Tønne (penalty missed)		(penalty missed) M. Flynn; (penalty scored) Fagan; (penalty scored) Jones; (penalty scored) Devitt; (penalty scored) Seip; (penalty missed) O'Brien; (penalty scored) Ramsden; (penalty scored) Mitchell

=== Pre–season and friendlies ===
9 July 2011	Sheffield	1–1	Sheffield United	Coach and Horses Ground, Dronfield
15:00	Purkiss 74'	(Report)	Philliskirk 35'	Attendance: 2,053

12 July 2011	Worksop Town	0–1	Sheffield United XI	Sandy Lane, Worksop
19:30		(Report)	Gregory 33'	Attendance: 1,364

18 July 2011	Sliema Wanderers	1–3	Sheffield United	Ta' Qali Stadium, Attard, Malta
18:30	Lima ( )	(Report)	Doyle 7'; Cresswell 15' (pen.); Maguire 22'

20 July 2011	Hibernians	1–2	Sheffield United	Paola Stadium, Malta
18:30	Dos Santos 15' (pen.)	(Report)	Bogdanović 3'; McAllister 57'; Maguire (red card) 15'

26 July 2011	Sheffield United	0–1	Doncaster Rovers	Bramall Lane
19:30		(Report)	Gillett 72'	Attendance: 5,002

27 July 2011	Alfreton Town	2–1	Sheffield United XI	North Street, Derbyshire
19:30	Clayton 32', 55'	(Report)	Tønne 35'

31 July 2011	Sheffield United	1–1	Blackpool	Bramall Lane
15:00	Porter 42'	(Report)	Sutherland 78'	Attendance: 5,696

2 August 2011	Stocksbridge Park Steels	0–4	Sheffield United XI	Bracken Moor, Stocksbridge
19:30		(Report)	Philliskirk 24'; Oates 32'; Conneely 35'; Oates

== Honours and awards ==
=== PFA League One Team of the Year ===
- Ched Evans
- Harry Maguire
- Stephen Quinn

=== League One Manager of the Month ===
- December: Danny Wilson

=== League One Player of the Month ===
- March: Ched Evans

=== Football League Young Player of the Month ===
- August: Harry Maguire

=== Sheffield Star Young Player of the Year ===
- Harry Maguire

=== League One Team of the Week ===
- 6/7 August: Stephen Quinn, Harry Maguire
- 27/28 August: Stephen Quinn
- 3/4 September: Neill Collins, Chris Porter, Stephen Quinn
- 17/18 September: Michael Doyle
- 15/16 October: Lee Williamson
- 29/30 October: Matt Phillips
- 19/20 November: Matthew Lowton
- 25/26 November: Matthew Lowton
- 10/11 December: Ched Evans, Matthew Lowton
- 15/16 January: Richard Cresswell, Stephen Quinn, Steve Simonsen
- 11/12 February: Ched Evans, Matthew Lowton, Kevin McDonald
- 18/19 February: Ched Evans, Lecsinel Jean-François
- 10/11 March: Matt Hill
- 31 March / 1 April: Ched Evans, Harry Maguire
- 14/15 April: Ched Evans, Lee Williamson

=== Fans Player of the Month ===
- August: Stephen Quinn
- September: Neill Collins
- October: Ched Evans
- November: Ched Evans
- December: Ched Evans
- January: Kevin McDonald
- February: Steve Simonsen
- March: Ched Evans
- April: Lee Williamson

=== Club end-of-season awards ===
- Player of the Year: Harry Maguire
- Young Player of the Year: Harry Maguire
- Goal of the Season: Nick Montgomery (vs. Tranmere Rovers)
