= Stephen Quinn =

Irish footballer

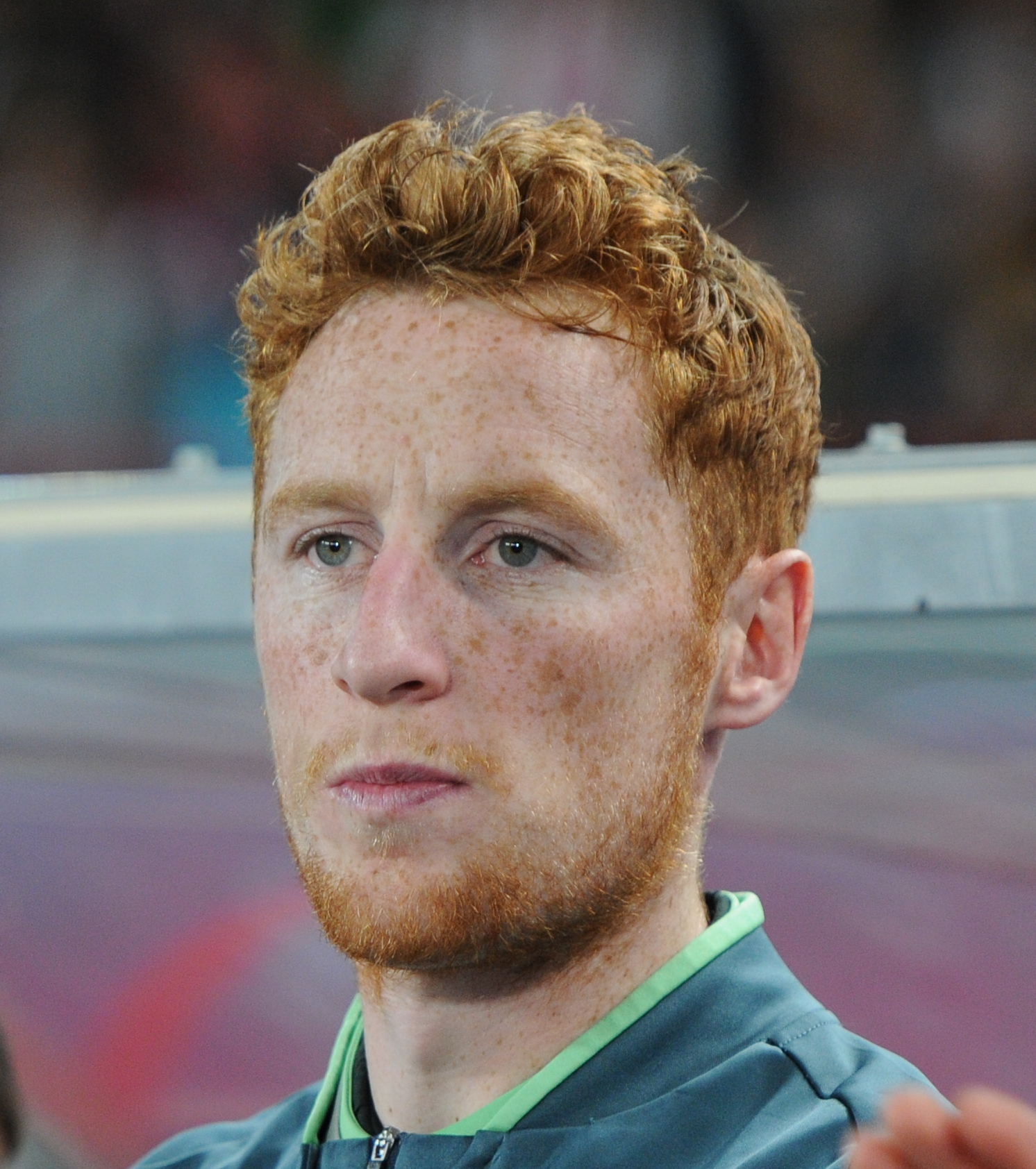
- Quinn in 2013

Personal information
- Full name: Stephen Jude Quinn
- Date of birth: 1 April 1986 (age 40)
- Place of birth: Dublin, Ireland
- Height: 5 ft 6 in (1.68 m)
- Position: Midfielder

Youth career
- –2005: St Patrick's Athletic

Senior career*
Years	Team	Apps	(Gls)
2004–2005	St Patrick's Athletic	1	(0)
2005–2012	Sheffield United	206	(20)
2005–2006	→ Milton Keynes Dons (loan)	15	(0)
2006	→ Rotherham United (loan)	16	(0)
2012–2015	Hull City	85	(4)
2015–2018	Reading	34	(1)
2018–2021	Burton Albion	93	(2)
2021	→ Mansfield Town (loan)	23	(2)
2021–2025	Mansfield Town	138	(8)

International career^{‡}
2007–2008	Republic of Ireland U21	9	(1)
2013–2016	Republic of Ireland	18	(0)
- * Club domestic league appearances and goals as of 14:37, 7 March 2026 (UTC) ‡ National team caps and goals as of 22:16, 5 October 2016 (UTC)

Stephen Jude Quinn (born 1 April 1986) is an Irish professional footballer who most recently played as a midfielder for EFL League One club Mansfield Town. He has also represented the Republic of Ireland national team.

He started his career with League of Ireland club St Patrick's Athletic before moving to Sheffield United in 2005. Quinn made over 200 appearances for the Blades, being their player of the season in 2011 and being in the Football League One PFA Team of the Year 2011–12. In 2012, he moved to Hull City and was a part of the team that won promotion back to the Premier League. Quinn also started the 2014 FA Cup Final against Arsenal. He is known for his set piece taking.

== Club career ==
=== St Patrick's Athletic ===
Born in Dublin, Quinn came through the youth set up of St Patrick's Athletic in the League of Ireland. He made his senior debut in a 2–1 loss to Shamrock Rovers on the 23rd of April 2004, which also proved to be his only senior appearance for the club.

=== Sheffield United ===
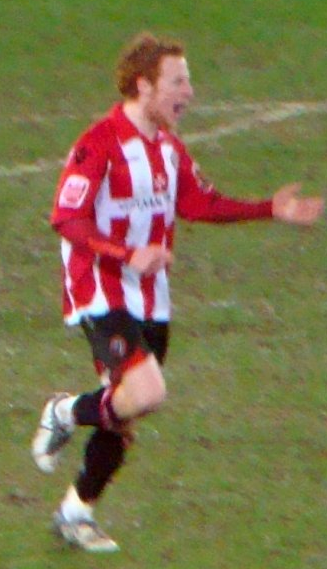
Quinn playing for Sheffield United in 2010

Quinn signed for Sheffield United in 2005 and he made his first team debut for the Blades in a League Cup win at Shrewsbury Town on 20 September 2005.

Quinn spent some of the 2005–06 season on loan with Milton Keynes Dons and Rotherham United respectively, becoming a fan favourite at The Millers where his performances helped them to avoid relegation.

Quinn made his Premiership debut for the Blades against Charlton Athletic, and could have almost scored within the first 40 seconds of the game. In his second appearance, a match against Aston Villa at Bramall Lane, he did score his first goal for the club. Quinn ended the season by winning the young player of the season award and was rewarded with a new contract. Sheffield United warded off interest allegedly from numerous Championship clubs during the summer 2011 transfer window, with Quinn being made aware of an offer – rejected by Sheffield United – from Blackpool (who also signed Daniel Bogdanović) by his agent. By 9 April 2012, Quinn provided more assists (14) than any other player in League One. He also scored four goals in the 2011–12 season.

=== Hull City ===
Quinn joined Championship club Hull City on a three-year contract for an undisclosed fee on 31 August 2012. It was later revealed that Hull City would pay Sheffield United £2,000 per game for his first 50 games, plus a further £100,000 if the Tigers were promoted to the Premier League. On 1 September 2012 at the KC Stadium against Bolton Wanderers, great work from Jay Simpson on the right edge saw him pull the ball back for Quinn, who marked his home debut with a simple finish past Ádám Bogdán from close range. Quinn enjoyed a highly successful first season in East Yorkshire, ending the campaign by winning Hull's Players' Player of the Season award as the Tigers were promoted to the Premier League under new manager Steve Bruce.

On 13 April 2014, he scored Hull's fourth goal in their 5–3 FA Cup semi-final win over Sheffield United at Wembley Stadium. On 17 May 2014 he started in the 2014 FA Cup Final against Arsenal. On 4 May 2015, Quinn scored for Hull City in a 1–3 defeat to Arsenal at the KC Stadium.

=== Reading ===
On 30 June 2015, Quinn signed a three-year contract with Reading after his deal with Hull City expired. Quinn scored his first goal for the club in a 2–1 loss to Preston North End on 30 April 2016. Reading announced on 11 May 2018 that Quinn would leave the club at the end of his contract.

=== Burton Albion ===
On 22 August 2018, Quinn joined League One club Burton Albion on a short-term deal until January 2019. On 15 January 2021, Quinn joined League Two side Mansfield Town on loan for the remainder of the 2020–21 season.

=== Mansfield Town ===
After having finished the season with Mansfield Town on loan, Quinn joined the club on a one-year permanent deal on 14 June 2021. In June 2022, having missed out on promotion in the 2022 play-off final, Quinn signed a new one-year contract at the club. On 24 May 2023, Quinn extended his contract by another year. On 2 May 2025, the club announced he would be leaving after the team's final game of the season on 3 May 2025.

== International career ==
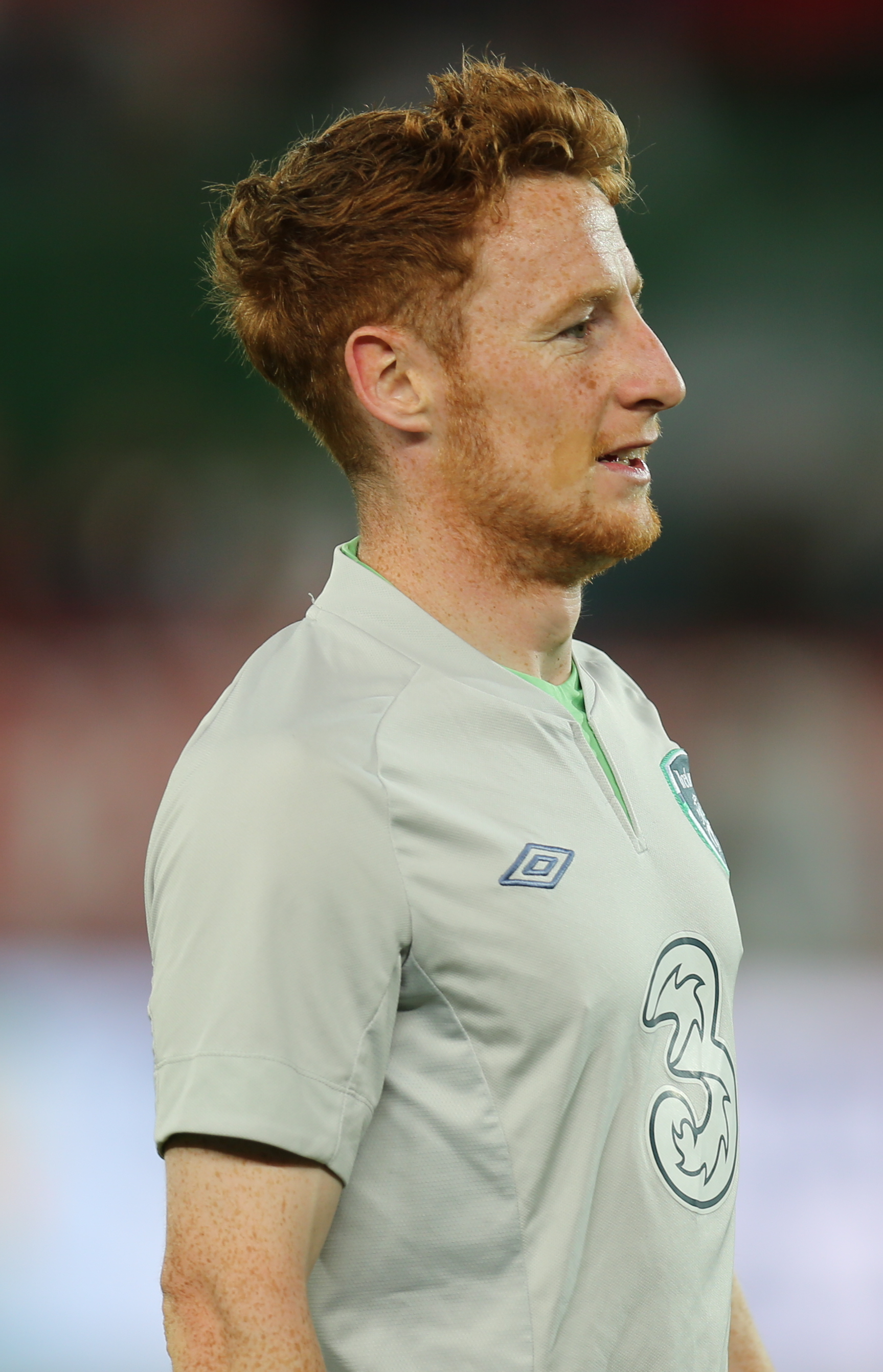
Quinn warming up for Ireland, September 2013

Quinn was called up by the Republic of Ireland for the first time as part of the senior squad to face San Marino in the UEFA Euro 2008 qualifier at the Serravalle Stadium on 4 February 2007.

He made his U21 international debut in the 1–0 loss against the Netherlands in Venlo on 27 March. Quinn scored his first international goal in a 3–2 victory against Sweden U-21 in October 2007.

Quinn won his first senior cap on 2 June 2013 when the Republic of Ireland beat Georgia 4–0. He would also go on to win a second cap against World Cup and European Champions Spain. On 7 September 2014 in Martin O'Neill's first competitive game in charge of Ireland, Quinn started his first competitive game against Georgia alongside Glenn Whelan and James McCarthy in midfield. Ireland won the game 2–1 thanks to a last minute winner by Aiden McGeady. Quinn admitted after the game that there was a "weight lifted off his shoulders" after making his competitive debut. Quinn started in a 1–1 draw against Germany, Quinn was criticised in the media for the German goal for standing off and allowing Toni Kroos the time to shoot and score.

== Personal life ==
Stephen Quinn is the younger brother of former Sheffield Wednesday and Sheffield United midfielder Alan Quinn, and the older brother of former Sheffield United midfielder Keith Quinn. His cousin Joe Redmond is also a professional footballer. His nephew winger Ben Quinn was also his teammate at Mansfield Town. He is nicknamed Mini Quinny in reference to older brother Alan.

== Career statistics ==
=== Club ===
As of end of 2024–25 season

Appearances and goals by club, season and competition
Club	Season	League			National cup		League cup		Other		Total	
Club	Season	Division	Apps	Goals	Apps	Goals	Apps	Goals	Apps	Goals	Apps	Goals
St Patrick's Athletic	2004	League of Ireland Premier Division	1	0	0	0	0	0	—		1	0
St Patrick's Athletic	2005	League of Ireland Premier Division	0	0	0	0	0	0	—		0	0
St Patrick's Athletic	Total		1	0	0	0	0	0	—		1	0
Sheffield United	2005–06	Championship	0	0	—		2	0	—		2	0
Sheffield United	2006–07	Premier League	15	2	1	0	1	0	—		17	2
Sheffield United	2007–08	Championship	19	2	4	0	2	0	—		25	2
Sheffield United	2008–09	Championship	43	7	2	0	2	1	3 (Note: Appearance(s) in Championship play-offs)	0	50	8
Sheffield United	2009–10	Championship	44	4	3	0	1	0	—		48	4
Sheffield United	2010–11	Championship	37	1	0	0	1	0	—		38	1
Sheffield United	2011–12	League One	45	4	3	0	2	1	3 (Note: Appearance(s) in League One play-offs)	0	53	5
Sheffield United	2012–13	League One	3	0	—		1	0	—		4	0
Sheffield United	Total		206	20	13	0	12	2	6	0	237	22
Milton Keynes Dons (loan)	2005–06	League One	15	0	1	0	—		3 (Note: Appearance(s) in Football League Trophy)	0	19	0
Rotherham United (loan)	2005–06	League One	16	0	—		—		—		16	0
Hull City	2012–13	Championship	42	3	2	0	—		—		44	3
Hull City	2013–14	Premier League	15	0	7	1	2	0	—		24	1
Hull City	2014–15	Premier League	28	1	1	0	0	0	0	0	29	1
Hull City	Total		85	4	10	1	2	0	0	0	97	5
Reading	2015–16	Championship	27	1	4	0	2	0	—		33	1
Reading	2016–17	Championship	7	0	0	0	3	1	0	0	10	1
Reading	2017–18	Championship	0	0	0	0	2	0	—		2	0
Reading	Total		34	1	4	0	7	1	0	0	45	2
Burton Albion	2018–19	League One	42	1	1	0	5	0	0	0	48	1
Burton Albion	2019–20	League One	29	0	4	0	3	0	2	1	38	1
Burton Albion	2020–21	League One	22	1	0	0	2	0	1	0	25	1
Burton Albion	Total		93	2	5	0	10	0	3	1	111	3
Mansfield Town (loan)	2020–21	League Two	23	2	—		—		—		23	2
Mansfield Town	2021–22	League Two	36	1	3	0	0	0	4 (Note: One appearance one goal in Football League Trophy; three appearances in League Two play-offs)	1	43	2
Mansfield Town	2022–23	League Two	40	2	2	0	1	0	1	0	44	2
Mansfield Town	2023–24	League Two	32	4	0	0	1	0	1	0	34	4
Mansfield Town	2024–25	League One	30	1	3	1	0	0	2	0	35	2
Mansfield Town	Total		138	8	8	1	2	0	8	1	156	10
Career total			611	37	41	2	33	3	20	2	705	44

=== International ===
Appearances and goals by national team and year
National team	Year	Apps	Goals
Republic of Ireland	2013	2	0
Republic of Ireland	2014	10	0
Republic of Ireland	2015	1	0
Republic of Ireland	2016	5	0
Total		18	0

== Honours ==
Hull City

- Football League Championship second-place promotion: 2012–13
- FA Cup runner-up: 2013–14

Mansfield Town

- EFL League Two third-place promotion: 2023–24

Individual

- Sheffield United Player of the Year: 2010–11
- PFA Team of the Year: 2011–12 League One
