= Michael Doyle (footballer, born 1981) =

Irish footballer (born 1981)

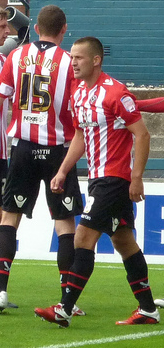

Personal information
- Full name: Michael Paul Doyle
- Date of birth: 8 August 1981 (age 45)
- Place of birth: Dublin, Ireland
- Height: 5 ft 10 in (1.78 m)
- Position: Midfielder

Senior career*
Years	Team	Apps	(Gls)
1998–2003	Celtic	0	(0)
2001–2002	→ AGF Aarhus (loan)	22	(4)
2003–2011	Coventry City	265	(20)
2009–2010	→ Leeds United (loan)	42	(0)
2011–2015	Sheffield United	188	(9)
2015–2017	Portsmouth	90	(3)
2017–2019	Coventry City	67	(4)
2019–2022	Notts County	83	(1)
Total		757	(41)

International career
2007	Republic of Ireland B	1	(0)
2001–2002	Republic of Ireland U21	6	(2)
2004	Republic of Ireland	1	(0)

Managerial career
- 2023–2024: Woking
- * Club domestic league appearances and goals

Michael Paul Doyle (born 8 August 1981) is a former professional footballer who was most recently manager of National League club Woking.

Born in Dublin, Doyle started his career at Celtic before a spell on loan in Denmark playing for AGF Aarhus. He subsequently spent the majority of his career at Coventry City and Sheffield United. Doyle has also been capped once by the Republic of Ireland.

== Club career ==
=== Early career ===
Doyle began his career as a trainee at Celtic turning full professional for them in August 1998. He and fellow Celtic teammate Liam Miller had a spell on loan in the Danish Premier League at club AGF Aarhus, with Doyle playing 22 League games and scoring four goals for the Danish side. During his time at Celtic, Doyle failed to make a single league appearance for the first team.

=== Coventry City ===
After the loan spell ended, Doyle signed for Coventry City which was managed by Gary McAllister after a successful trial, having been recommended by McAllister's assistant Eric Black who worked with Doyle at Celtic. Doyle made his début against Peterborough United in the Football League Cup in August 2003, and scored in his appearance away against Ipswich Town in a 1–1 draw. Doyle played regularly throughout the season either side under the management of both McAllister and his successor Black.

Under Peter Reid, Doyle continued to play whenever fit, forging a useful partnership with captain Stephen Hughes. After Reid's departure Doyle continued to be favoured by new manager Micky Adams, scoring in the crucial away win at Watford, as the side avoided relegation from the Championship.

In 2005–06, Doyle continued to play regularly, captaining the side on a number of occasions since Christmas, notably in the 2–0 home win over Wolverhampton Wanderers. This came in his first match after a suspension for his dismissal in the previous home game against Crewe Alexandra for arguing with the referee. Doyle was named permanent captain of Coventry by Iain Dowie. Doyle was part of the Coventry team that beat Manchester United in the League Cup at Old Trafford, which remains one of the most famous League Cup upsets in recent years.

During the 2008–09 season, Doyle was a regular under Chris Coleman, starting 39 games for Coventry in all competitions. But due to the signing of Sammy Clingan from Norwich in the summer of 2009, Doyle found his first team place under threat, the reason for him wishing to seek guaranteed first team football elsewhere.

=== Leeds United (loan) ===
At the start of the 2009–10 season, Doyle joined Leeds United on a season long loan and made his first team début in the first game of the season, a win against Exeter. Having become first choice in midfield Doyle said in an interview to Yorkshire Evening Post on in October that he would love to make his loan move from Coventry permanent, and he hoped that if he could impress manager Simon Grayson enough and earn Leeds promotion that it would help his chances in securing a permanent contract at the Elland Road club. In his first six-months at Leeds, Doyle has been a regular starter partnering either Neil Kilkenny or Jonathan Howson in centre midfield, with Doyle only missing games through suspension or being rested by Simon Grayson for squad rotation.

After Leeds were knocked out of the Football League Trophy, Doyle was dropped from the starting line-up for the first time in the league against Leyton Orient but remained a regular first team player. Leeds were duly promoted to the Football League Championship after finishing in second place in League One and thus earning automatic promotion. In total Doyle had played 52 games for Leeds in all competitions during the course of the season. After promotion, Doyle claimed in interviews that he still wanted to join Leeds permanently rather than return to Coventry. He also revealed that promotion with Leeds was his greatest achievement of his football career to date.

Leeds manager Simon Grayson decided not to sign Doyle permanently, Doyle returned to Coventry. During Doyle's loan at Leeds, Coventry manager Chris Coleman had been sacked and succeeded by Adrian Boothroyd, who saw Doyle as an important member of the team. Doyle started the season as first choice midfielder alongside Lee Carsley in the heart of Coventry's midfield before dropping to the bench as the season progressed. Following this and in the build up to Coventry's game against his former club Leeds, Doyle controversially stated that his time at Leeds was the best year of his life. Back in the side Doyle scored his first goal for 21 months in November, a long range effort against Burnley.

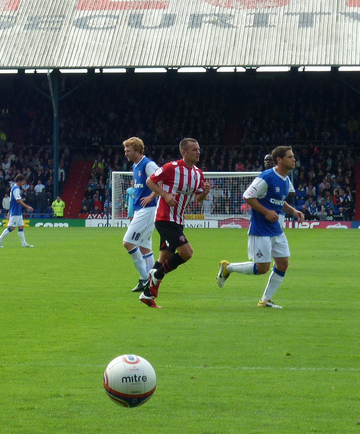
Doyle playing for the Blades against Oldham Athletic in 2011.

=== Sheffield United ===
Doyle signed for Sheffield United on a free transfer during the January 2011 transfer window, a move that reunited him with former boss Micky Adams, and made his début in a 1–0 loss to Leicester City a few days later. He played regularly for the remainder of the season but with the club in decline he was unable to help to stop the Blades slipping to relegation. Regaining his place in the starting eleven at the outset of the following season, Doyle was awarded with the captain's armband as he played regularly in the centre of midfield. As the team challenged for promotion, Doyle scored his first goal for the Blades in January 2012, scoring against Yeovil Town at Bramall Lane.

United failed to gain promotion, but in September 2012, Doyle signed a new three-year contract with the club, committing his future until 2015. Doyle remained a regular in the side throughout the season as United fought another fruitless promotion battle.

=== Portsmouth ===
On 6 July 2015, Doyle joined Portsmouth after being released by Sheffield United. Doyle was made club captain, and was an integral part of a side which finished the season in sixth place, earning a place in the play-offs; Doyle and Portsmouth ultimately lost to Plymouth in the semi-finals. He finished the season with 50 appearances and 2 goals in all competitions.

He signed a one-year contract extension on 5 January 2016, keeping him at Portsmouth until the summer of 2017.

Doyle retained the captaincy during the 2016–17 season; a campaign which saw Portsmouth win the League Two championship after four years in the English professional game's basement division. Though Doyle's defensive midfield partner changed several times over the course of the season, with Danny Rose and Amine Linganzi vying for a place in the first XI, Doyle remained first-choice for the screening role in front of the defence. He featured 96 times for the Blues, finding the net on three occasions.

=== Return to Coventry City ===
On 11 May 2017, Doyle returned to Coventry City after having captained Portsmouth to its League Two victory. He commented that he would have resigned for Portsmouth if the club would have made an offer of a contract extension. Manager Mark Robins said that he was delighted in welcoming him back to his former club. He also added that his "leadership qualities on and off the pitch can not be underestimated". In the same season, Doyle captained Coventry City to League 1 promotion, when the team won the 2017–18 League Two Play-Off Final at Wembley against Exeter, marking back-to-back promotion successes for Doyle as a team captain. On 31 May 2018, Coventry City confirmed that Doyle's contract extension had been triggered, with the Sky Blues' captain's contract now expiring 30 June 2019. Doyle said "I came here to try and get this club back to the Championship where it should be and where it belongs..."[i]t's my club now and I will stay here and it will be my club for the rest of my life."

Doyle triggered a one-year contract extension with Coventry at the end of the 2017–18 season.

=== Notts County ===
On 31 January 2019, Doyle signed for Notts County on a free transfer.

On 11 January 2020, Doyle scored his first goal for Notts, a strike from the halfway line which was later named as Notts' goal of the season.

He played in goal for 72 minutes in a 3–1 victory against Dagenham & Redbridge when regular goalkeeper Sam Slocombe was shown an early red card. He credited his years playing Gaelic football for Dublin GAA club St Mark's in Tallaght with providing him good practice for catching the ball.

On 4 May 2021, following the departure of Maurice Ross, Doyle agreed to take over as assistant head coach for the remainder of the 2020/21 season.

On 21 June 2021, Doyle agreed to become assistant head coach at Notts County permanently and whilst he is still registered as a player, his main focus will now be in his coaching role.

== Coaching career ==
=== Forest Green Rovers ===
On 27 May 2022, Doyle left his position as player-assistant head coach at Notts County, to join departing County manager Ian Burchnall as assistant head coach at League One club Forest Green Rovers.

On 27 January 2023, Doyle left Forest Green Rovers along with first-team coach Ben Turner after the club parted company with Ian Burchnall on 26 January 2023.

=== Portsmouth ===
On 3 July 2023, Doyle was appointed as a Professional Developmental Phase coach at Portsmouth FC's youth academy, reuniting him with his former club.

=== Woking ===
On 17 December 2023, Doyle was appointed manager of National League club Woking on a two-and-a-half-year contract. On 14 December 2024, Doyle was sacked after a run of 1 win in 14 league matches.

== International career ==
Doyle made his debut for the Republic of Ireland when he appeared as a substitute for Andy Reid in a 1–0 win over Holland in Amsterdam in 2004 but it was to be his only cap. In 2007, he played for the Republic of Ireland B team. He scored twice on his Republic of Ireland national under-21 football team debut in 2001

== Career statistics ==
Appearances and goals by club, season and competition
Season	Club	League			FA Cup		EFL Cup		Other		Total	
Season	Club	Division	Apps	Goals	Apps	Goals	Apps	Goals	Apps	Goals	Apps	Goals
Coventry City	2003–04	First Division	40	5	3	0	2	0	0	0	47	6
Coventry City	2004–05	Championship	44	2	2	0	3	1	0	0	49	3
Coventry City	2005–06	Championship	44	0	3	0	2	0	0	0	49	0
Coventry City	2006–07	Championship	40	3	2	0	0	0	0	0	42	3
Coventry City	2007–08	Championship	42	7	3	0	4	0	0	0	49	7
Coventry City	2008–09	Championship	37	2	5	1	2	0	0	0	44	3
Coventry City	2010–11	Championship	18	1	1	0	0	0	0	0	19	1
Coventry City	Total		265	20	19	1	13	1	0	0	297	22
Leeds United (loan)	2009–10	League One	42	0	6	0	3	0	1	0	52	0
Sheffield United	2010–11	Championship	16	0	0	0	0	0	0	0	16	0
Sheffield United	2011–12	League One	43	3	4	0	2	0	5	0	54	3
Sheffield United	2012–13	League One	43	3	4	0	1	0	4	0	52	3
Sheffield United	2013–14	League One	43	2	7	0	1	1	1	0	52	3
Sheffield United	2014–15	League One	43	1	5	0	7	0	2	0	57	1
Sheffield United	Total		188	9	20	0	11	1	12	0	231	10
Portsmouth	2015–16	League Two	44	2	4	0	0	0	2	0	50	2
Portsmouth	2016–17	League Two	46	1	0	0	0	0	0	0	46	1
Portsmouth	Total		90	3	4	0	0	0	2	0	96	3
Coventry City	2017–18	League Two	44	3	4	0	0	0	4	0	52	3
Coventry City	2018–19	League One	23	1	1	0	0	0	0	0	24	1
Coventry City	Total		67	4	5	0	0	0	4	0	76	4
Notts County	2018–19	League Two	17	0	0	0	0	0	0	0	17	0
Notts County	2019–20	National League	29	0	3	0	0	0	2	0	34	0
Notts County	2020–21	National League	37	1	0	0	0	0	3	1	40	2
Notts County	2021–22	National League	0	0	0	0	0	0	0	0	0	0
Notts County	Total		83	1	3	0	0	0	5	1	91	2
Career total			735	37	57	1	27	2	23	0	843	41

== Managerial statistics ==
As of match played 14 December 2024

Managerial record by team and tenure
Team	From	To	Record					Ref
Team	From	To	P	W	D	L	Win %	Ref
Woking	17 December 2023	14 December 2024	51	14	15	22	27.5	
Total			51	14	15	22	27.5	—

== Honours ==
Leeds United

- Football League One second-place promotion: 2009–10

Portsmouth

- EFL League Two: 2016–17

Coventry City

- EFL League Two play-offs: 2018

Individual

- Coventry City Player of the Year: 2004–05
- Portsmouth Player of the Season: 2015–16
