= Terry Kennedy (footballer) =

English footballer (born 1993)

Personal information
- Full name: Terry Kennedy
- Date of birth: 14 November 1993 (age 33)
- Place of birth: Barnsley, England
- Height: 5 ft 10 in (1.78 m)
- Position: Defender

Youth career
- Barnsley
- Sheffield United

Senior career*
Years	Team	Apps	(Gls)
2011–2016	Sheffield United	19	(0)
2015–2016	→ Cambridge United (loan)	2	(0)
2016–2017	Alfreton Town	27	(0)
2017–2018	Harrogate Town	23	(7)
2018–2019	Guiseley	3	(0)
Total		74	(7)
- * Club domestic league appearances and goals

Terry Kennedy (born 14 November 1993) is an English former professional footballer who last played as a defender for Guiseley. Born in Barnsley, he spent time at his hometown club as a junior before making the switch to Sheffield United.

== Career ==
Kennedy made his début for the Blades in May 2011, coming on as a substitute in the last game of the 2010–11 season against Swansea City at the Liberty Stadium. Much was expected of Kennedy heading into his second season as a professional with the Blades, but due to a recurring knee problem he missed the majority of the campaign and didn't make a single appearance. After an intense rehabilitation period, Kennedy made his first start for the Blades in away game against Doncaster Rovers on 1 January 2013. Despite only making one appearance during the previous season, Kennedy had his contract with the Blades extended in June 2013. Upon signing a new contract, Kennedy stated "I'm happy to sign a new deal at United... Hopefully, I'll be able to repay the club, both this season and in the future, for the faith they've shown in me." Kennedy's contract with United was extended on 16 May 2014. On 31 January 2015, Kennedy signed a new contract with United keeping him at Bramall Lane until summer 2016.

On 19 November 2015, he signed on loan for Cambridge United until 3 January 2016.

After leaving Sheffield United in 2016, Kennedy played for Alfreton Town, Harrogate Town and Guiseley. A knee injury meant that he had to retire early, Kennedy played his last game in football for Guiseley in the National League North against York City on 29 September 2018 aged 26.

Kennedy's early retirement from football led to him to start working as a builder. In November 2021, Kennedy won £1 million on The National Lottery. The footage of Kennedy finding out he had won the jackpot while on his break at work went viral.

== Career statistics ==
Appearances and goals by club, season and competition
Club	Season	League			FA Cup		League Cup		Other		Total	
Club	Season	Division	Apps	Goals	Apps	Goals	Apps	Goals	Apps	Goals	Apps	Goals
Sheffield United	2010–11	Championship	1	0	0	0	0	0	—		1	0
Sheffield United	2011–12	League One	0	0	0	0	0	0	0	0	0	0
Sheffield United	2012–13	League One	1	0	0	0	0	0	0	0	1	0
Sheffield United	2013–14	League One	5	0	1	0	0	0	0	0	6	0
Sheffield United	2014–15	League One	11	0	2	0	0	0	0	0	13	0
Sheffield United	2015–16	League One	1	0	0	0	0	0	2 (Note: Appearances in the Football League Trophy)	0	3	0
Sheffield United	Total		19	0	3	0	0	0	2	0	24	0
Cambridge United (loan)	2015–16	League Two	2	0	0	0	—		—		2	0
Alfreton Town	2016–17	National League North	27	0	4	1	—		2 (Note: Appearances in the FA Trophy)	0	33	1
Harrogate Town	2017–18	National League North	23	7	1	0	—		3	0	27	7
Guiseley	2018–19	National League North	3	0	1	0	—		0	0	4	0
Career total			74	7	9	1	0	0	7	0	90	8
