= Matthew Harriott =

Footballer (born 1992)

Personal information
- Full name: Matthew Anthony Harriott
- Date of birth: 23 September 1992 (age 34)
- Place of birth: Luton, England
- Position: Midfielder

Team information
- Current team: Hendon FC
- Number: 13

Youth career
- 2009–2010: Luton Town
- 2010–2011: Sheffield United

Senior career*
Years	Team	Apps	(Gls)
2010–2013	Sheffield United	2	(0)
2012	→ Burton Albion (loan)	4	(0)
2012–2013	→ Alfreton Town (loan)	10	(0)
2013–2014	Northampton Town	5	(0)
2013	→ Hayes & Yeading United (loan)	4	(0)
2014–2015	Hayes & Yeading United	39	(1)
2015–2016	Wealdstone	17	(7)
2016	Wilmington Hammerheads	0	(0)
2018-2019	Bedford Town	10	(1)
2018-2020	Hendon FC	27	(5)
- * Club domestic league appearances and goals

Matthew Anthony "Matty" Harriott (born 23 September 1992) is a footballer who plays as a midfielder. He began his career with Sheffield United and has had spells on loan at Burton Albion, Alfreton Town and Hayes & Yeading United. He later played for Northampton Town. Born in England, Harriott was selected to represent Republic of Ireland at U19 level.

== Club career ==
=== Sheffield United ===
Born in Luton, Harriott came through the youth ranks of Luton Town. He made a move to Sheffield United in August 2010. Progressing quickly with the Blades, he made his first team début for the Blades in the 84th minute of a 2–2 home match against Doncaster Rovers at Bramall Lane in early January 2011. Having made only one further appearance for the Yorkshire club Harriott joined Football League Two side Burton Albion on a one-month loan deal in March 2012. He made four appearances for the Brewers before returning to United after his loan spell was cut short following a change in managerial staff at Burton Albion. The following season Harriott joined Alfreton Town on a months loan in November 2012, which was later extended until 6 January 2013, and again to the maximum 93 days allowed. Having made 13 appearances for Alfreton, Harriott returned to United but after failing to break into the first team Harriott left the club in June 2013 after they failed to offer him a new contract.

=== Northampton Town ===
After being released from the Blades, Harriott signed a one-year deal with Northampton Town on 30 August 2013. In November 2013 Harriott joined Hayes & Yeading United on loan until 14 December 2013.

== International career ==
Harriott was selected for the Republic of Ireland Under 19s in January 2011.

== Career statistics ==
As of 11 January 2014

Appearances and goals by club, season and competition
Club	Season	League			FA Cup		League Cup		Other		Total	
Club	Season	Division	Apps	Goals	Apps	Goals	Apps	Goals	Apps	Goals	Apps	Goals
Sheffield United	2010–11	Championship	2	0	0	0	0	0	0	0	2	0
Sheffield United	2011–12	League One	0	0	0	0	1	0	1	0	2	0
Sheffield United	2012–13	League One	0	0	0	0	0	0	1	0	1	0
Sheffield United	Total		2	0	0	0	1	0	2	0	5	0
Burton Albion (loan)	2011–12	League Two	4	0	0	0	0	0	0	0	4	0
Alfreton Town (loan)	2012–13	Conference National	10	0	0	0	0	0	3	0	13	0
Northampton Town	2013–14	League Two	5	0	0	0	0	0	1	0	6	0
Hayes & Yeading (loan)	2013–14	Conference South	4	0	0	0	0	0	0	0	4	0
Career total			25	0	0	0	1	0	6	0	32	0
