= Erik Tønne =

Norwegian football player (born 1991)

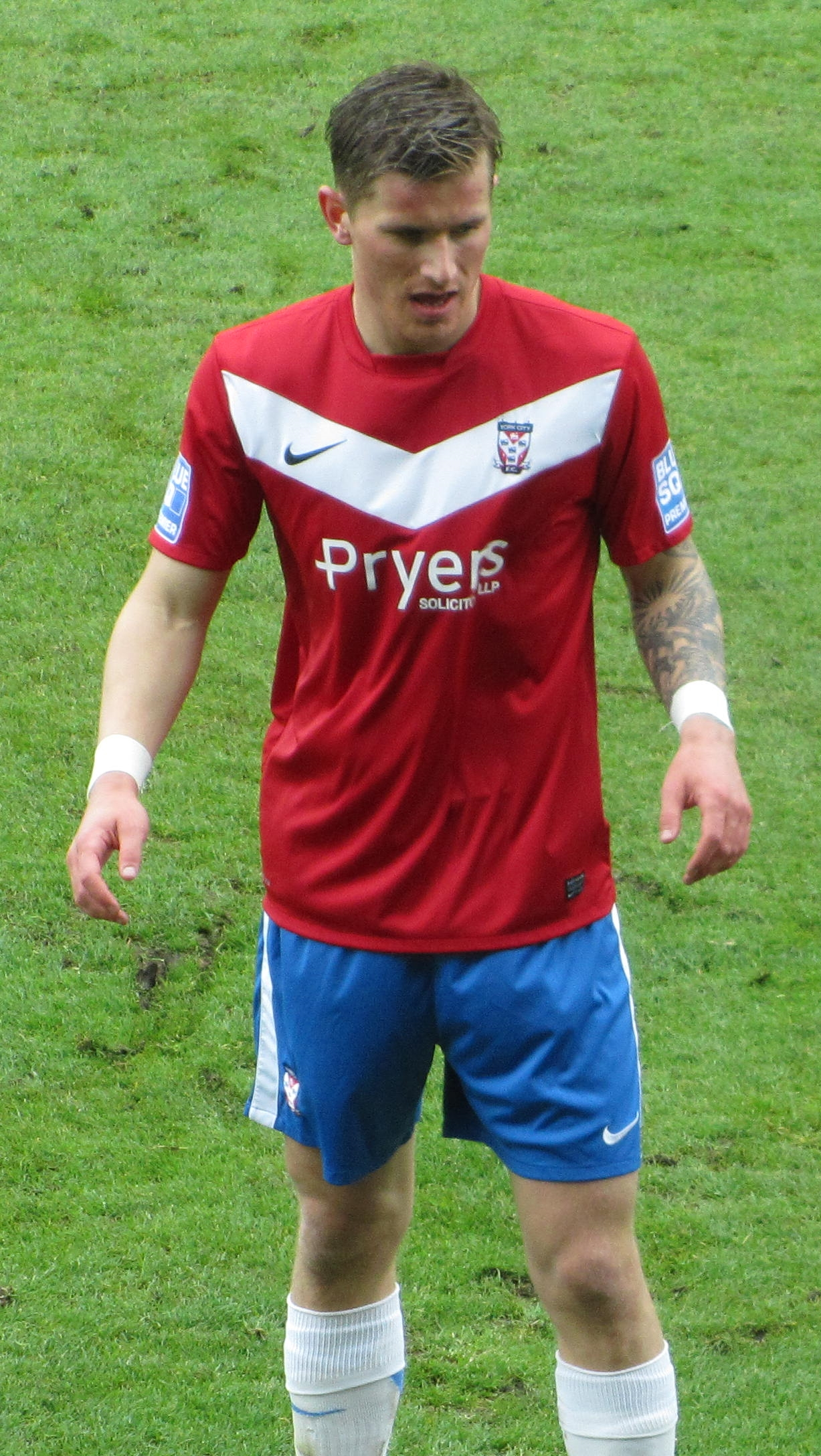
- Tønne in 2012

Personal information
- Full name: Erik Tønne
- Date of birth: 3 July 1991 (age 35)
- Place of birth: Trondheim, Norway
- Height: 1.80 m (5 ft 11 in)
- Position: Left-back

Team information
- Current team: Nardo
- Number: 15

Youth career
- –2006: Nardo
- 2006–2008: Rosenborg
- 2008–2011: Strindheim

Senior career*
Years	Team	Apps	(Gls)
2011–2013	Sheffield United	4	(1)
2012	→ York City (loan)	3	(1)
2013	→ HamKam (loan)	17	(4)
2013–2015	Sandnes Ulf	36	(0)
2015	Bodø/Glimt	9	(1)
2016	Fredrikstad	28	(3)
2017	Levanger	29	(3)
2018–2025	Ranheim	214	(31)
2026–	Nardo	2	(0)
- * Club domestic league appearances and goals as of 11 April 2026

Erik Tønne (born 3 July 1991) is a Norwegian professional footballer who played as a left-back for Nardo.

Tønne began his playing career as a youngster with Nardo, Rosenborg and Strindheim in his native Norway before moving to England to sign for Sheffield United in 2011. He has also had loan spells at York City and HamKam.

== Career ==
=== Early career in Norway ===
Born in Trondheim, Sør-Trøndelag, Tønne started his career with Nardo before joining Rosenborg's youth system in 2006. He was released by Rosenborg at his own request after two years at the club and subsequently joined Strindheim. At Strindheim he was the team's top scorer two seasons running as a left back.

=== Sheffield United ===
Tønne undertook a trial with English Championship club Sheffield United during September 2010 before signing a permanent deal in February 2011 as part of the club's development squad. After impressing in the reserve team he was called up to the first team squad and eventually made his debut on 9 April 2011, coming on as an 86th minute substitute against Middlesbrough in a 2–1 home defeat. He finished the 2010–11 season, his first in senior football, with two appearances as United were relegated to League One.

Tønne's first goal for United came when he scored in the 79th minute against League Two side Burton Albion in the Football League Trophy first round on 30 August with a strike from outside the penalty area, which proved to be the winning goal in a 2–1 victory. He then scored his first league goal for United a few days later with a fine volley to cap off a 4–0 victory against Bury, which he described as "something special". Having established himself on the fringes of the first team Tønne signed a contract extension in January 2012 to keep him at United until the summer of 2014, and was subsequently loaned to Conference Premier side York City until the end of the 2011–12 season. He made his debut in a 1–0 victory at home to Ebbsfleet United in the FA Trophy third round on 14 February 2012, and scored his only goal for York with the winner away at Braintree Town in a 1–0 victory on 21 April, a result that confirmed York's place in the play-offs. He took no part in the play-offs, which York won to earn promotion to League Two, finishing his loan with four appearances and one goal.

Tønne did not feature for United the following season and in March 2013 he was allowed to return to Norway for a trial with HamKam, and was subsequently signed an eight-month loan deal with the club. He made his debut in HamKam's opening game of the 2013 season, a 2–2 home draw with Stabæk on 6 April 2013.

=== Sandnes Ulf ===
On 8 August 2013 it was confirmed that Tønne had been recalled from his loan at HamKam so that he could sign for Sandnes Ulf in the Tippeligaen on a permanent basis, thus ending his career with Sheffield United.

Tønne made his debut, coming on as a 57th-minute substitute for Marius Helle against Tromsø on 11 August 2013, when his new teammates won 2–1 at home.

== Career statistics ==
As of match played 11 April 2026.

Club statistics
Club	Season	League			National Cup		League Cup		Other		Total	
Club	Season	Division	Apps	Goals	Apps	Goals	Apps	Goals	Apps	Goals	Apps	Goals
Sheffield United	2010–11	Championship	2	0	—		—		—		2	0
Sheffield United	2011–12	League One	2	1	0	0	0	0	2 (Note: Appearances in Football League Trophy)	1	4	2
Sheffield United	2012–13	League One	0	0	0	0	0	0	0	0	0	0
Sheffield United	Total		4	1	0	0	0	0	2	1	6	2
York City (loan)	2011–12	Conference Premier	3	1	—		—		1 (Note: Appearance in FA Trophy)	0	4	1
HamKam (loan)	2013	Adeccoligaen	17	4	2	0	—		—		19	4
Sandnes Ulf	2013	Tippeligaen	10	0	—		—		—		10	0
Sandnes Ulf	2014	Tippeligaen	25	0	0	0	—		—		25	0
Sandnes Ulf	2015	OBOS-ligaen	1	0	0	0	—		—		1	0
Sandnes Ulf	Total		46	0	0	0	—		—		36	0
Bodø/Glimt	2015	Tippeligaen	9	1	—		—		—		9	1
Bodø/Glimt	Total		9	1	0	0	—		—		9	1
Fredrikstad	2016	OBOS-ligaen	28	3	1	0	—		—		29	3
Fredrikstad	Total		28	3	1	0	—		—		29	3
Levanger	2017	OBOS-ligaen	29	3	3	0	—		—		32	3
Levanger	Total		29	3	3	0	—		—		32	3
Ranheim	2018	Eliteserien	30	7	2	0	—		—		32	7
Ranheim	2019	Eliteserien	20	2	3	1	—		—		22	3
Ranheim	2020	OBOS-ligaen	30	13	0	0	—		2 (Note: Appearances in Eliteserien play-offs)	0	32	13
Ranheim	2021	OBOS-ligaen	27	2	1	0	—		—		28	2
Ranheim	2022	OBOS-ligaen	27	2	2	1	—		—		29	3
Ranheim	2023	OBOS-ligaen	24	2	3	0	—		—		27	2
Ranheim	2024	OBOS-ligaen	27	1	1	0	—		—		28	1
Ranheim	2025	OBOS-ligaen	29	2	3	0	—		1 (Note: Appearances in Eliteserien play-offs)	0	33	2
Ranheim	Total		214	31	15	2	—		3	0	232	33
Nardo	2026	3. divisjon	2	0	0	0	—		—		2	0
Nardo	Total		2	0	0	0	—		—		2	0
Career total			352	43	21	2	0	0	6	1	379	46

== Honours ==
Individual

- Norwegian First Division Player of the Month: August 2020
