= Marc Warren (soccer) =

Australian soccer player (born 1992)

Personal information
- Full name: Marc Warren
- Date of birth: 11 February 1992 (age 34)
- Place of birth: Sutherland, New South Wales, Australia
- Height: 1.75 m (5 ft 9 in)
- Position: Left back

Team information
- Current team: Sutherland Sharks
- Number: 3

Youth career
- Menai Hawks
- Sutherland Sharks
- 2007–2008: NSWIS
- 2008–2009: Sydney
- 2009–2010: AIS

Senior career*
Years	Team	Apps	(Gls)
2010–2011	Central Coast Mariners	0	(0)
2011–2012	Sheffield United	0	(0)
2012–2013	Airdrie United	26	(1)
2013–2014	Sydney FC	8	(0)
2014–2015	APIA Leichhardt	28	(2)
2015–2018	Perth Glory	37	(0)
2018	APIA Leichhardt	5	(0)
2018	Marconi Stallions	8	(0)
2019–2020	Sutherland Sharks	18	(0)
2021–	Mount Druitt Town Rangers	15	(0)

International career^{‡}
2007–2009	Australia U-17	13	(4)
2010–2011	Australia U-20	13	(0)
Medal record
Representing Australia
Men's Association football
AFC U-20 Asian Cup
Runner-up	2010 China
- * Club domestic league appearances and goals as of 9 November 2021 ‡ National team caps and goals as of 7 August 2011

Marc Warren (born 11 February 1992) is an Australian professional soccer player who last played as a left-back for Perth Glory in the A-League.

He is a product of the Australian Institute of Sport Football Program having played for them in the 2009–10 A-League National Youth League. Born in Sutherland, Australia, Warren spent some time in the United Kingdom where he played for Sheffield United and Airdrie United and has also represented his country at under-17 and under-20 level.

== Club career ==
=== Early career ===
Warren grew up in the Sutherland area of Sydney and played for local clubs Menai Hawks and Sutherland Sharks before being selected for the 2009–10 season squad with the Australian Institute of Sport Football Program. He was then signed by the Central Coast Mariners for the 2010–11 season. In July 2010, Warren and fellow Central Coast Mariners teammate Trent Sainsbury were chosen to spend two weeks at Sheffield United's Academy as part of the two clubs' partnership.

=== Sheffield United ===
In January 2011, Warren signed for Sheffield United on a two-year contract. Warren showed that he was a bright young talent and proved he was a versatile left-sided player. training with the 1st team and Captain of the reserve team Warren showed leadership and determination. Warren also sat on the bench for the 1st team at a young age.

=== Airdrie United ===
Following his release from Sheffield United, Warren was linked with a move back to his first club Western Sydney Wanderers, joining them on trial to earn a contract. Warren failed to impress the club enough to earn a new deal, and the Wanderers declined to offer him a contract. Having failed to secure a move back to Australia, Warren returned to the United Kingdom, joining Scottish Division One side Airdrie United on a one-year contract. Warren left Airdrie to come back to Sydney FC.

=== Sydney FC ===
On 14 June 2013, Warren signed a one-year deal with A-League side Sydney FC, returning to Australia for the first time in a year. After the move, Warren described his return as a "great feeling", with Manager Frank Farina describing Warren as a "local boy". After a strong start to the season, Warren picked up a red card and was off the park for a few weeks. On his return picked up a groin injury that sat him out for the rest of the season.

=== APIA Leichhardt ===
On 17 April 2014, Warren signed a remainder of the NSW Premier League deal with APIA Leichhardt.

=== Perth Glory ===
Warren made a return to professional football, after accepting a 1-year contract from A-League club Perth Glory, following a 3-week trial. On 20 February 2018, Warren and Perth Glory mutually terminated his contract to allow him to explore other opportunities.

== International career ==
Warren represented Australia at the 2007 International Youth Football Championship and played 3 times, scoring once against South Korea. Warren represented Australia with the Young Socceroos' at the FIFA U-20 World Cup in Columbia.

== Personal life ==
With the club promoting their coaching in the community project, Warren revealed he taking up coaching sessions and said: "I’ve done bits and pieces of coaching back home in Australia. The club asked if I was interested in being part of this and I said yes. I really enjoyed coming in to teach the kids."

== Career statistics ==
Club	Season	League			Cup		Continental		Total	
Club	Season	Division	Apps	Goals	Apps	Goals	Apps	Goals	Apps	Goals
Central Coast Mariners	2010–11	A-League	0	0	0	0	0	0	0	0
Sheffield United	2010–11	Championship	0	0	0	0	0	0	0	0
Sheffield United	2011–12	League One	0	0	0	0	0	0	0	0
Airdrie United	2012–13	Scottish First Division	27	0	3	0	0	0	30	0
Sydney FC	2013–14	A-League	8	0	0	0	0	0	8	0
APIA Leichhardt Tigers	2014	National Premier Leagues	14	1	0	0	0	0	14	1
APIA Leichhardt Tigers	2015	National Premier Leagues	14	1	4	0	0	0	18	1
APIA Leichhardt Tigers	Tigers total		28	2	4	0	0	0	32	2
Perth Glory	2015–16	A-League	22	0	5	0	0	0	27	0
Perth Glory	2016–17	A-League	13	0	2	0	0	0	15	0
Perth Glory	2017–18	A-League	0	0	0	0	0	0	0	0
Perth Glory	Perth total		35	0	7	0	0	0	42	0
Career total			98	2	14	0	0	0	112	2

== Honours ==
Australia U-20

- AFC U-20 Asian Cup: runner-up 2010
