= Elian Parrino =

Argentine footballer (born 1988)

Personal information
- Full name: Elian Franco Parrino
- Date of birth: 3 September 1988 (age 38)
- Place of birth: Rosario, Argentina
- Height: 1.89 m (6 ft 2 in)
- Position: Defender

Team information
- Current team: Benicarló

Youth career
- Estudiantes LP

Senior career*
Years	Team	Apps	(Gls)
2008–2012	Estudiantes LP		
2009–2010	→ Grupo Universitario (loan)		
2010–2012	→ Sheffield United (loan)	14	(0)
2012–2013	Juventud Antoniana	28	(0)
2013–2014	Instituto	17	(0)
2014	Lokomotiv Plovdiv	9	(0)
2015	Douglas Haig		
2015–2016	Coquimbo Unido	32	(2)
2016–2017	Shkëndija	2	(0)
2017–2019	Legnago Salus	63	(1)
2019–	Benicarló		
- * Club domestic league appearances and goals as of 21:14, 29 December 2019 (UTC)

Elian Franco Parrino (born 3 September 1988) is an Argentinian footballer who currently plays as a defender for Spanish club CD Benicarló.

Born in Rosario, he started his career with Estudiantes de La Plata and holds an Italian passport which permits him to play within the European Union.

== Club career ==
=== Sheffield United ===
Having started his career in his homeland of Argentina with Estudiantes de La Plata and was spotted by Sheffield United when he appeared in a pre-season friendly against them in the summer of 2010. He subsequently signed for the Blades on a year-long loan following a brief trial spell. Despite this move he barely even made the substitutes bench during the first half of the season, with manager Gary Speed claiming he was not ready for English football.

Following the departure of Speed the arrival of new Blades manager Micky Adams helped to re-ignite Parrino's season, immediately handing him a place in the starting line up and installing him as first choice at right-back. Unfortunately, his spell in the first team came to an end when he injured his metatarsal in February, an injury which would put him out of action for the remainder of the campaign, although in May 2011, Parrino expressed his desire to stay at Bramall Lane after his loan contract expired. After returning to Argentina to recover from his injuries, in late July it was speculated that Parrino would return to the Blades and that Estudiantes had given permission for the defender to speak about a return to England. After impressing manager Danny Wilson, he signed a new one-year deal with the Blades in mid-August. After failing to make the breakthrough into the first team the following season however, United agreed to end Parrino's deal and allow him to leave the club during the January transfer window. In February of that year Lincoln City suggested they had tried to sign Parrino before the transfer window closed but could not gain international clearance in time, with boss David Holdsworth suggesting they would try and resurrect the deal in the summer. Parino joined Lokomotiv Plovdiv in the A PFG in the summer of 2014.

== Career statistics ==
Club	Season	League		FA Cup		League Cup		Continental		Other		Total	
Club	Season	Apps	Goals	Apps	Goals	Apps	Goals	Apps	Goals	Apps	Goals	Apps	Goals
Sheffield United	2010–11	8	0	1	0	0	0	-		-		9	0
Sheffield United	2011–12	0	0	0	0		0	-		2	0	2	0
Career total		8	0	1	0	0	0	0	0	2	0	11	0
