= Jean Calvé =

French footballer (born 1984)

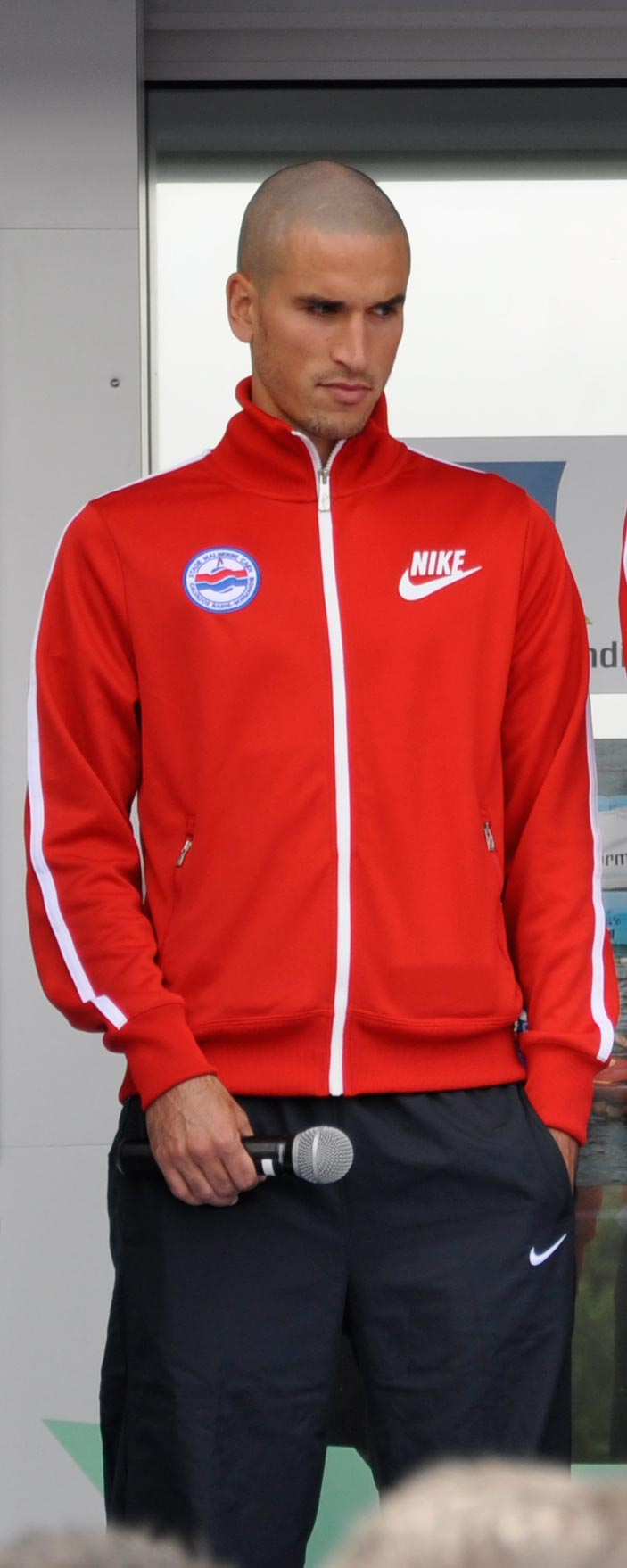
- Calvé with Caen in 2012

Personal information
- Date of birth: 30 April 1984 (age 42)
- Place of birth: Cormeilles-en-Parisis, France
- Height: 1.82 m (6 ft 0 in)
- Position: Right-back

Senior career*
Years	Team	Apps	(Gls)
2005–2006	Sochaux	17	(0)
2006–2008	Le Mans	54	(0)
2008–2012	Nancy	18	(1)
2009	→ Lorient (loan)	9	(0)
2009–2010	→ Grenoble (loan)	24	(0)
2010–2011	→ Sheffield United (loan)	18	(1)
2012–2015	Caen	84	(5)
2015–2016	OH Leuven	0	(0)
2016–2017	Amiens	13	(0)
2017–2018	El Ejido	9	(0)
2018–2019	Berja	0	(0)
2019–2020	Saint-Leu	4	(0)
- * Club domestic league appearances and goals

Jean Calvé (born 30 April 1984) is a French former professional footballer who played as a right-back.

== Career ==
Calvé was born in Cormeilles-en-Parisis, Val-d'Oise.

=== Sheffield United ===
Following his various loan spells in France, Calvé arrived at Bramall Lane on trial in July 2010. Having played one pre-season game, then Blades boss Kevin Blackwell opted not to sign him. However, following Blackwell's departure a few weeks later, incoming boss Gary Speed quickly revived the move and Calvé signed a one-year loan deal with the Yorkshire club and suggested a desire to remain with Sheffield United following the completion of his loan spell.

Calvé scored his first ever career goal in his début game for the Blades against Preston North End at the end of August, smashing a 35-yard shot into the top corner. Despite an impressive start to his Blades career Calvé failed to cement himself in the first team, making only eighteen appearances that season. With the arrival of yet another new manager, Micky Adams, he was deemed surplus to requirements and was eventually released from his contract at the start of April 2011.

=== Caen ===
On 22 May 2012, Calvé joined Ligue 2 side Stade Malherbe Caen on a free transfer.

== Honours ==
- Ligue 2 team of the season: 2012–13
