= Lecsinel Jean-François =

Haitian footballer (born 1986)

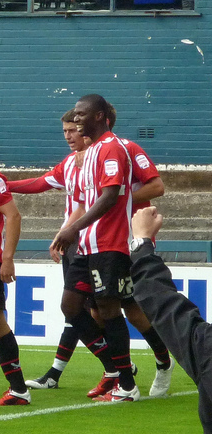

Personal information
- Full name: Lecsinel Jean-François
- Date of birth: 2 October 1986 (age 40)
- Place of birth: Cayenne, French Guiana, France
- Height: 6 ft 2 in (1.88 m)
- Position: Defender

Youth career
- ?–2003: Paris Saint-Germain

Senior career*
| Years | Team | Apps | (Gls) |
| 2003–2004 | Paris Saint-Germain B | 2 | (0) |
| 2004–2006 | Sedan B | 0 | (0) |
| 2006 | Falkirk | 9 | (0) |
| 2006–2008 | Guingamp | 12 | (0) |
| 2006–2008 | Guingamp B | 19 | (0) |
| 2009–2011 | Swindon Town | 56 | (1) |
| 2011–2013 | Sheffield United | 25 | (0) |
| Total | | 123 | (1) |

International career^{‡}
| 2008–2011 | Haiti | 4 | (0) |
- * Club domestic league appearances and goals as of 02:07, 30 July 2017 (UTC) ‡ National team caps and goals as of 22:36, 25 May 2011 (UTC)

Lecsinel Jean-François (born 2 October 1986) is a former footballer who played as a defender. He last played for Sheffield United in 2013. Born in Cayenne, French Guiana, Jean-François began his career in France with Paris Saint-Germain and Sedan, before a spell in Scotland with Falkirk. He returned to France briefly, where he played for Guingamp, before settling in England, with spells at Swindon Town and Sheffield United. Qualifying to represent Haiti through his parents, Jean-François made four appearances for the national side.

== Club career ==
=== Early career ===
Jean-François began his career in France, coming through the youth ranks of Paris Saint-Germain before joining CS Sedan Ardennes. In January 2006, he signed for Scottish Premier League side Falkirk, where he made a handful of appearances before departing the club at the end of the season to join French Ligue 2 side En Avant de Guingamp.

In July 2008, he was named as a trialist for Aberdeen in their pre-season friendly match against Brechin City, but he failed to win a contract.

=== Swindon Town ===
In late January 2009 he arrived at Swindon Town and appeared in a reserve match against Swansea City, and impressed manager Danny Wilson sufficiently for him to offer him a contract until the end of the 2008–09 season.

Jean-François eventually made his début for Swindon in February 2009, making a total of five appearances by the end of the season. As a result of these performances he was one of four out of contract players offered new contracts in May 2009. and signed a one-year extension the following month.

=== Sheffield United ===
After being released by Swindon, Jean-François joined up with former boss Danny Wilson once more, signing for Sheffield United in June 2011. After making his début for his new club on the opening day of the season, away at Oldham Athletic he appeared regularly at left back until he sustained a cruciate ligament injury the following March which ruled him out for the remainder of the season. In October 2012 he returned from injury and played the last 15 minutes in a 4–1 victory over Notts County at Meadow Lane in the Football League Trophy, however he injured his other knee and was ruled out for a further 2 months. Having failed to regain his fitness for the remainder of the season, Jean-François was released by United in June 2013. In December 2013 Jean-François returned to former club Sheffield United to continue his rehabilitation process. This was agreed following his release in the summer, but new United manager Nigel Clough stated "there is no deal on the table."

== International career ==
Despite being born in French Guiana, Jean-François qualifies to play for Haiti as it is the birthplace of his parents. Following his move to Sheffield United his form prompted a recall to the Haiti national team in 2011 to face Antigua and Barbuda for World Cup qualifiers.

After the earthquake in Haiti, Jean-François's home nation, money from the match between Swindon Town, his team at the time, and Leeds United was donated to help the disaster in Haiti.
