= 2012–13 Sheffield United F.C. season =

Sheffield United
2012–13 season
- Group Chairman: Kevin McCabe
- Chairman: Kevin McCabe (Group Chairman); Dave Green (from 12 October 2012); Christopher Steer (to 12 October 2012) (Football Club Chairman)
- Manager: Danny Wilson (to 10 April 2013); Chris Morgan (from 10 April 2013)
- Stadium: Bramall Lane
- League One: 5th
- FA Cup: Fourth round (eliminated by Reading)
- League Cup: First round (eliminated by Burton Albion)
- Football League Trophy: Quarter final (eliminated by Coventry City)
- Top goalscorer: League: Blackman (11); Kitson (11); All: Blackman (14)
- Highest home attendance: 23,431 (vs Brentford)
- Lowest home attendance: 15,744 (vs Walsall)
- Average home league attendance: 18,611
Home colours	Away colours	Third colours

Sheffield United Football Club participated in League One, the third level of English football in 2012–13, after having failed to win promotion, losing in the previous season's play-off final. Danny Wilson remained in charge for a second season and the club continued to reduce costs as they sought to adapt to life at the third level of English football. Many of the players involved in the previous season were either sold or released, while the likes of Nick Blackman, Tony McMahon, Shaun Miller and Dave Kitson were signed to replace them.

The team went unbeaten in the league until November, briefly climbing to the top of the table, and returned to first place once again over the Christmas period. United had little success in the various cup competitions however, as they were beaten in the first round of the Football League Cup by Burton Albion, and by Coventry City in the Football League Trophy. They did manage to reach the fourth round of the FA Cup but were comprehensively beaten by Reading, a result which came amidst a rapid downturn in league form during January, that almost saw United almost drop out of the play-off places. After a brief recovery through February, the decline in results continued and following another string of poor results in April, Danny Wilson was dismissed as manager, with coach Chris Morgan being appointed as caretaker for the remainder of the season.

Despite the change of manager, United's form did not significantly improve and they finished the season in 5th place in the league, thus facing Yeovil Town in the play-offs. Having beaten Yeovil 1–0 in the first leg, they were defeated by two goals in the second and as such were consigned to remain in League One for at least another season.

== Background ==
The previous season had been United's first in the third tier of English football for 23 years and had seen them install Danny Wilson as manager. United had competed for automatic promotion throughout the season but when top scorer Ched Evans was handed a prison sentence after being convicted of rape in April, the team's results tailed off towards the end of the season and they were overtaken by local rivals Sheffield Wednesday who claimed the final automatic promotion spot. United reached the play-off final but were beaten on penalties by Huddersfield Town, consigning United to a second season in League One.

== Team kit ==
In June United struck a deal with gaming company Redtooth to sponsor the team's away kit for the coming season. It had been expected that the team shirts would be jointly sponsored by Westfield Health and Gilders as per the previous season but the club announced that the car dealers were to continue a commercial relationship with the club but would no longer be shirt sponsors. At the end of July United officially launched their new away kit baring Redtooth's logo. In a change to the previous season the shirt itself was predominantly black with a light-red trim and a light-red diagonal stripe across the chest. In September the club announced a new third kit, this one being all white, introduced to avoid further colour clashes. At the end of that month the club also announced a new secondary kit sponsor, revealing that the GCI Com logo would be included on the back of the team shirts.

== Season overview ==
=== Pre-season ===
Pre-season began with 11 players being released, including former Player of the Year James Beattie, defenders Andy Taylor and Johnny Ertl, and first choice stopper Steve Simonsen. Three senior out-of-contract players were offered new terms with Kevin McDonald, Chris Porter and Lee Williamson being offered the chance to remain with United. On 5 July Chris Porter signed a two-year contract with the option of a third, while Academy graduate Jordan Chapell also agreed a new one-year deal. The following day young right-back Matthew Lowton was sold to Premier League Aston Villa for an undisclosed fee. The Blades returned to pre-season training having arranged the now annual pre-season tour of Malta, followed by a string of low key friendlies. With manager Danny Wilson seeking to improve the squad, on 13 July he signed 19-year-old striker John Cofie from Manchester United on a season-long loan. The first game of pre-season came against non-league Ilkeston where a side relying mainly on young players and triallists were held to a 1–1 draw after Harry Maguire had opened the scoring. A day later the Blades made their first permanent signing of the transfer window with 21-year-old right back Darryl Westlake signing a two-year deal with the option of a third year, with a fee to be agreed with his former club Walsall via a tribunal due to his age.

The squad commenced their summer training camp on the island of Malta and their next fixture saw them record a comfortable 6–0 victory over local side Zejtun Corinthians. As the training camp continued Chris Morgan announced during a question and answer session with the fans in attendance that he had decided to retire from playing due to a recurrent injury, and that he would now focus solely on his role as reserve-team coach. The following day United confirmed that Kevin McDonald had signed a new two-year contract, the news coming a couple of hours before the Blades were held to a 0–0 draw by Maltese side Hibernians. Back in the UK, and with July almost over, United made a triple signing, handing two-year deals to defenders Tony McMahon who had been released by Middlesbrough, and former loanee Matt Hill who had left Blackpool, along with signing striker Shaun Miller for an undisclosed fee from Crewe Alexandra. United's final game of July saw them take on Rotherham United at their newly opened ground, The New York Stadium, and recording a 1–0 victory thanks to a goal from loanee John Cofie.

As August began a United XI travelled the short distance to Hallam where two goals each from Ironside and Philliskirk were enough to secure a comfortable 4–0 victory. Joe Ironside was on target again a few days later as both he and new signing Tony McMahon scored to give United a 2–0 victory at Morecambe. With pre-season coming to an end reserve coach Chris Morgan took a young United XI side to Matlock Town where they recorded a 1–0 victory thanks to a goal from Erik Tønne. Then, the day before the season opener against Burton Albion, United announced the signing of Blackburn Rovers striker Nick Blackman on a two-year deal for an undisclosed fee.

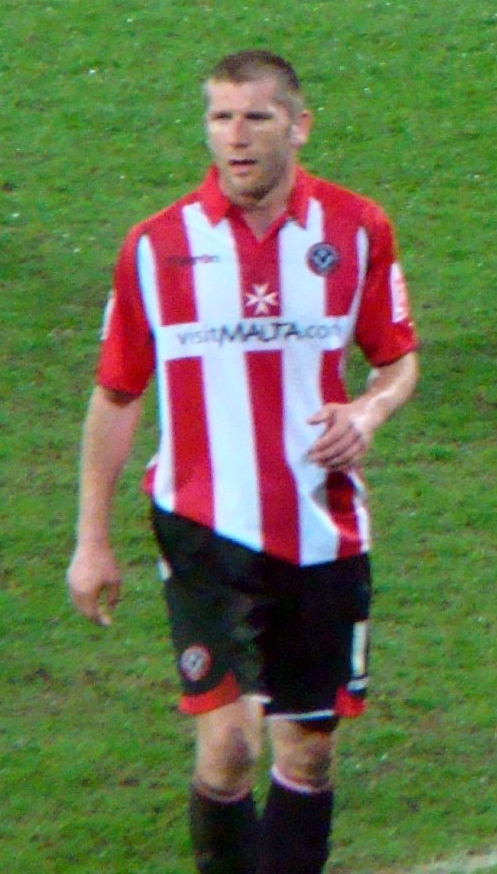
Veteran Richard Cresswell became a player-coach.

=== August and September: Too many draws ===
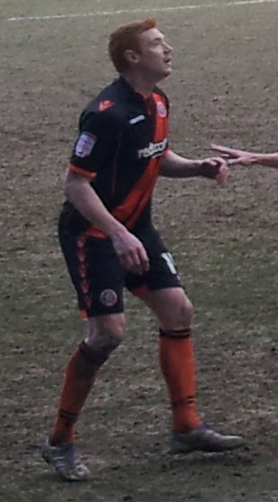
The Blades signed Dave Kitson on deadline day.

The Blades first competitive game of the season was a home League Cup tie against Burton Albion. Howard, Miller, Blackman, McMahon and McFadzean all made their first team débuts for United but with the game tied at 2–2 after extra time United lost on penalties for the second game in succession. The Blades began their league campaign with a home game against newly promoted Shrewsbury Town, winning 1–0 thanks to a goal from former Shrewsbury loanee David McAllister. A trip to Coventry City followed a few days later with United snatching a late goal for a 1–1 draw, with the same result being repeated the following Saturday as the Blades were held to another draw by Colchester United.

With the transfer window closing at the end of August, United continued to reshape their squad in an effort to reduce the wage bill, agreeing a new contract with Richard Cresswell for him to become player coach. On the final day of transfer activity the club agreed to sell Stephen Quinn to Hull City for an undisclosed fee, and allowed Nick Montgomery, the club's then longest serving player, to leave in order to move to Australia. United concluded their summer transfer dealings by offering former Portsmouth striker Dave Kitson a short-term deal to run up until Christmas 2012.

September began with a 5–3 victory over Bournemouth at Bramall Lane thanks in part to a brace of goals from Ryan Flynn. Flynn was also a central figure in the following game as both he and fellow midfielder Michael Doyle were shown red cards against Scunthorpe United before the Blades came from behind to grab a 1–1 draw. Off the field, the following week the club parted company with Chief Executive Julian Winter and Director of Academy Coaching John Pemberton, citing ongoing restructuring. With the red cards for both Doyle and Flynn being upheld on appeal, Danny Wilson bolstered the squad by bringing forward Paul Gallagher in on a months loan from Leicester City. Back on the pitch Gallagher, Kitson and Westlake all made their United debuts as the Blades were held to a 1–1 draw by Bury at Bramall Lane, whilst a 0–0 draw was the result when Doncaster Rovers visited Sheffield a couple of days later. A third goal of the season from Neill Collins was enough to continue the Blades' unbeaten start with a 1–0 victory over Yeovil Town at Huish Park. Despite the return of Michael Doyle and Ryan Flynn from suspension and a first goal from Dave Kitson, United were forced to settle for yet another 1–1 draw in their last game of September, versus Notts County at Bramall Lane.

=== October and November: Long live King George ===
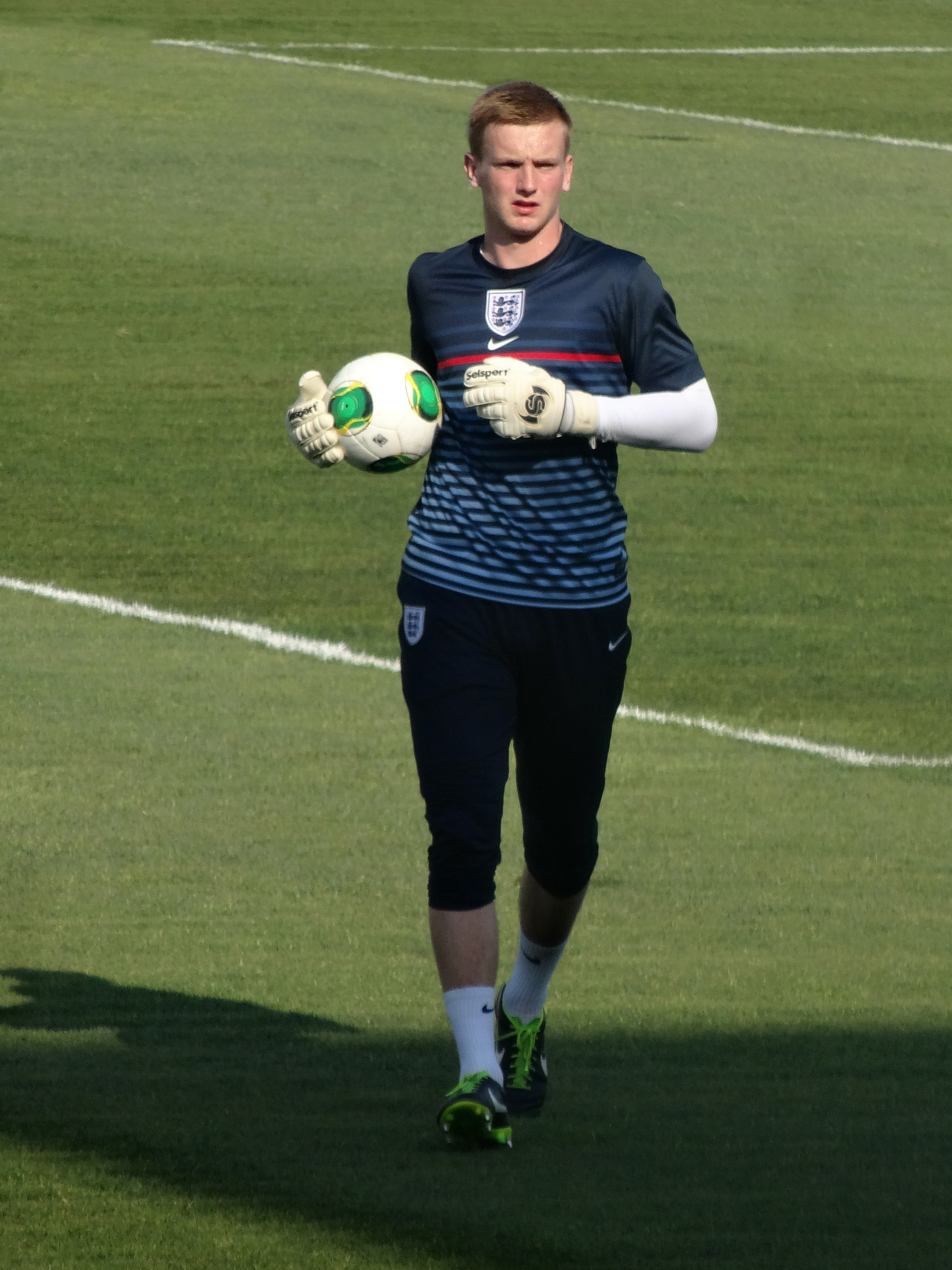
George Long became first choice stopper following Mark Howard's thigh injury.

October started more positively for the Blades as a late goal from Paul Gallagher, his first for the club, snatched a victory in an away fixture against Hartlepool United. United then made it two wins in a row on their travels as they defeated Leyton Orient 1–0 thanks to Nick Blackman's fifth goal of the campaign. During the match Mark Howard suffered a thigh injury in the 11th minute, being replaced in goal by George Long, and was later ruled out for up to 12 weeks. The following week, and despite attempts to retain his services, Paul Gallagher's loan period expired and he returned to his parent club. The Blades also announced changes to the Football Club board, with chairman Chris Steer stepping down to be replaced by Dave Green, and Nigerian financier Jacob Esan being added as a director. Despite George Long having made some impressive performances, Danny Wilson still looked to bring in another goalkeeper as cover and confirmed that former Wales international and free agent Danny Coyne had been invited to train with the Blades; but insisted that Long would continue to be first choice for the time being. The Blades then entertained Oldham Athletic at Bramall Lane, a bad tempered match which saw Oldham score in the seventh minute of injury time to snatch a 1–1 draw, and Lactics striker Lee Croft subsequently accused of racially abusing a ball boy. Having received a bye for the first round, United began their Football League Trophy campaign with a 4–1 victory over Notts County at Meadow Lane. Lecsinel Jean-François played for the first time in over six months after a knee injury, appearing for the last 15 minutes as a substitute, however he injured his other knee and was ruled out for a further two months. Back in the league and a trip to Preston North End culminated in a 1–0 win thanks to a Dave Kitson goal, before a Nick Blackman penalty was enough to claim the same result in a home game against Walsall. With the month almost over the Blades beat the likes of Manchester United, Manchester City, Chelsea and Arsnenal by handing a three-year deal to 17-year-old Academy player Diego De Girolamo, before another Nick Blackman spot-kick was enough to despatch Portsmouth 1–0 at Bramall Lane.

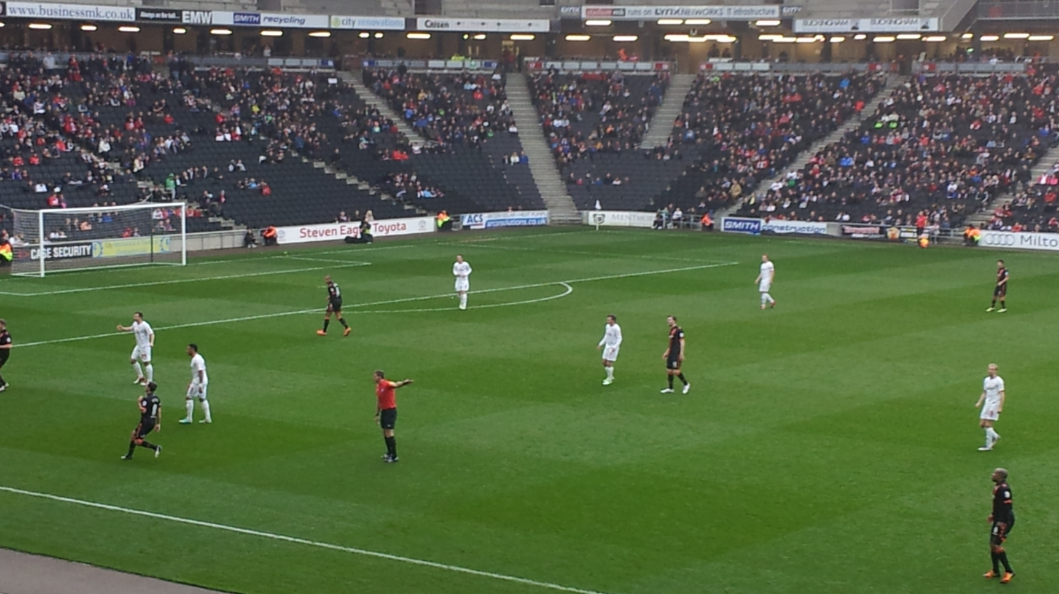
The Blades against MK Dons

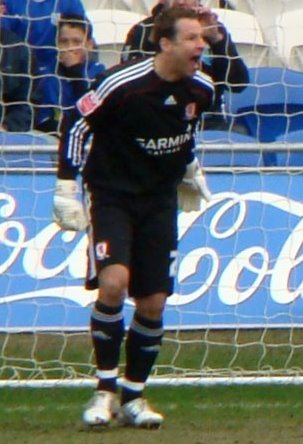
Welsh veteran Danny Coyne signed as goalkeeping cover in November.

November began with a trip to Bristol to face Bristol Rovers in the first round of the FA Cup. Despite conceding an early goal United came back to score twice in the second half and book their place in the second round. Back in League One an away trip to Swindon Town ended in a 0–0 stalemate, but it was a result that allowed United to climb into the automatic promotion places for the first time in the season. A few days later vice-captain Neill Collins extended his current contract by a further two years until Summer 2015 with the option of another year, before the Blades unbeaten run finally came to an end as they conceded a controversial last minute penalty to lose 1–0 away at Milton Keynes Dons. The following week Matthew Harriott was allowed to join Alfreton Town on loan, initially until 9 December, while Harry Maguire made his England Under-21 début as a substitute in the 60th minute, coming on for Liverpool's Andre Wisdom in a 2–0 against Northern Ireland Under-21 at Bloomfield Road. A few days later it was announced that Danny Wilson had been named League One Manager of the Month and that George Long had won League One Player of the Month for October. Later the same day, Dave Kitson extended his contract until the end of the season with the option of another year; Kitson stated that "It wouldn't have sat comfortably with me to leave a job half done after integrating myself into a great squad". At the end of a busy week free agent and former Wales national goalkeeper Danny Coyne signed a 28-day deal as cover for George Long as third choice keeper George Willis had sustained a minor injury preventing him from playing. Seven days after the disappointing defeat at MK Dons, United returned to winning ways in emphatic style, convincingly beating promotion rivals Stevenage 4–1 at Bramall Lane, thanks in part to a brace from Shaun Miller who was making his first league start for United. A mid-week home fixture against Crewe Alexandra followed which ended in a 3–3 draw, despite United having taken a two-goal lead in the first half. The following day Jordan Chapell extended his loan with Burton Albion for a further month, before the final game of November saw United slip to a damaging 2–0 defeat away at Brentford.

=== December and January: (Briefly) Top of the league ===
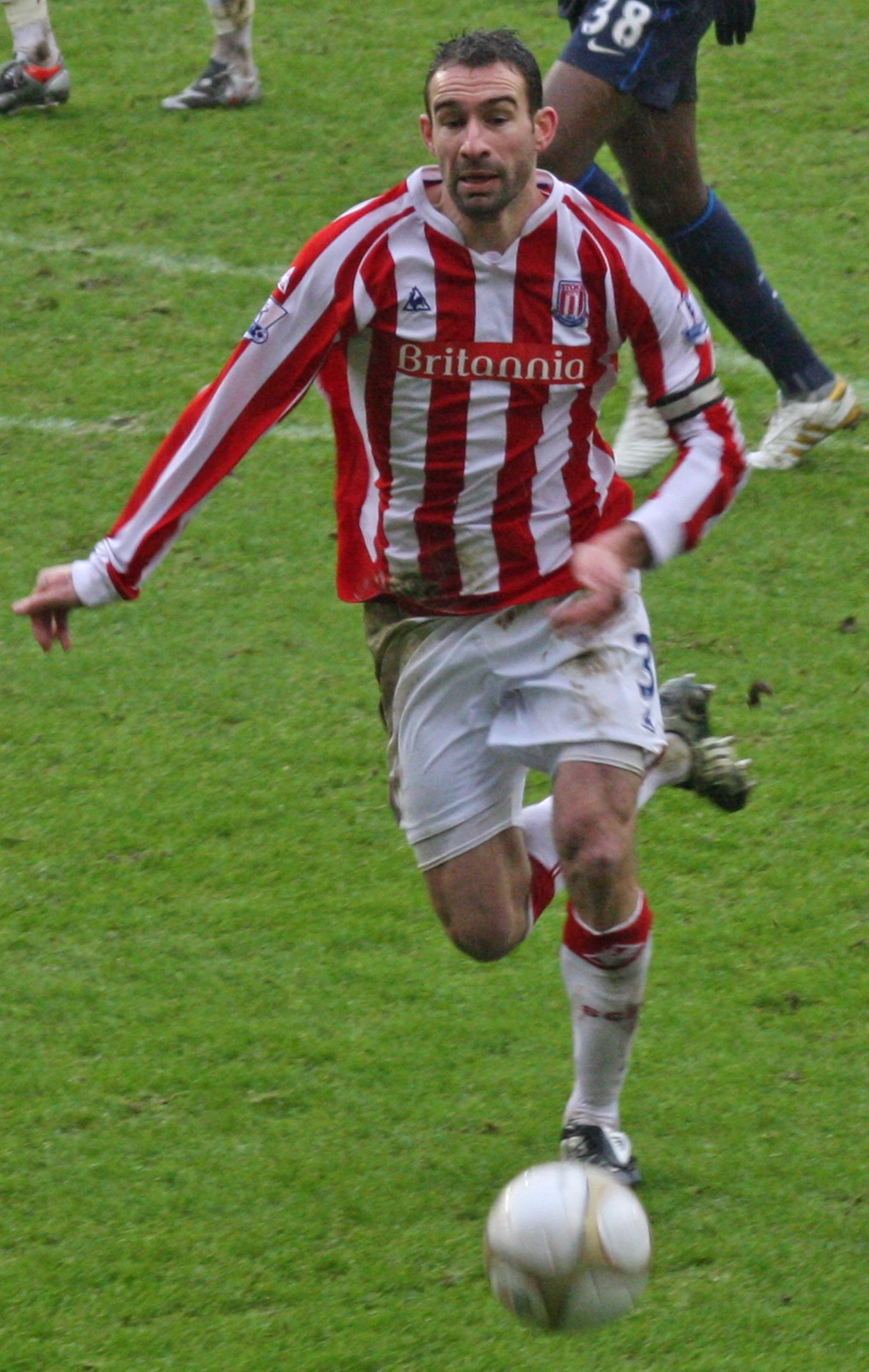
Experienced defender Danny Higginbotham joined United in January on a free transfer from Stoke City.

On 1 December the Blades returned to winning ways with a late 2–1 victory over former United boss Micky Adams's Port Vale side in the second round of the FA Cup at Bramall Lane. Shaun Miller saved the day for the Blades with a brace in injury time after Vale had taken the lead in the first half. With the Blades beginning to struggle with injuries Jordan Chapell was recalled early from his loan spell at Burton Albion, and returned to the United first-team later that day as the Blades crashed out of the Football League Trophy on penalties to Coventry City. Meanwhile, Matthew Harriott extended his loan deal with Alfreton Town until 6 January and back in the league United returned to winning ways, defeating Carlisle United 3–1, but were held to a 0–0 draw by table-topping Tranmere Rovers the following week. After Danny Coyne extended his short-term contract to keep him with the club until the end of January, United started their festive programme by rising to the top of the League One table following a 2–0 win over Crawley Town on their first ever visit to the Broadfield Stadium thanks to two goals from Tony McMahon, before a comfortable 3–0 home win over Scunthorpe United on Boxing Day consolidated their place as league leaders. With injuries and suspensions starting to weaken the first-team United finished the year by slipping to a surprising 2–3 home defeat to bottom club Hartlepool United, a result which saw them drop to second in the table. On 28 December it was announced that due to injuries sustained against Scunthorpe United, Shaun Miller would be out for the remainder of the season and out up to nine months in total with a cruciate knee ligament injury; whilst Neill Collins would be out for around two months with a fractured cheekbone.

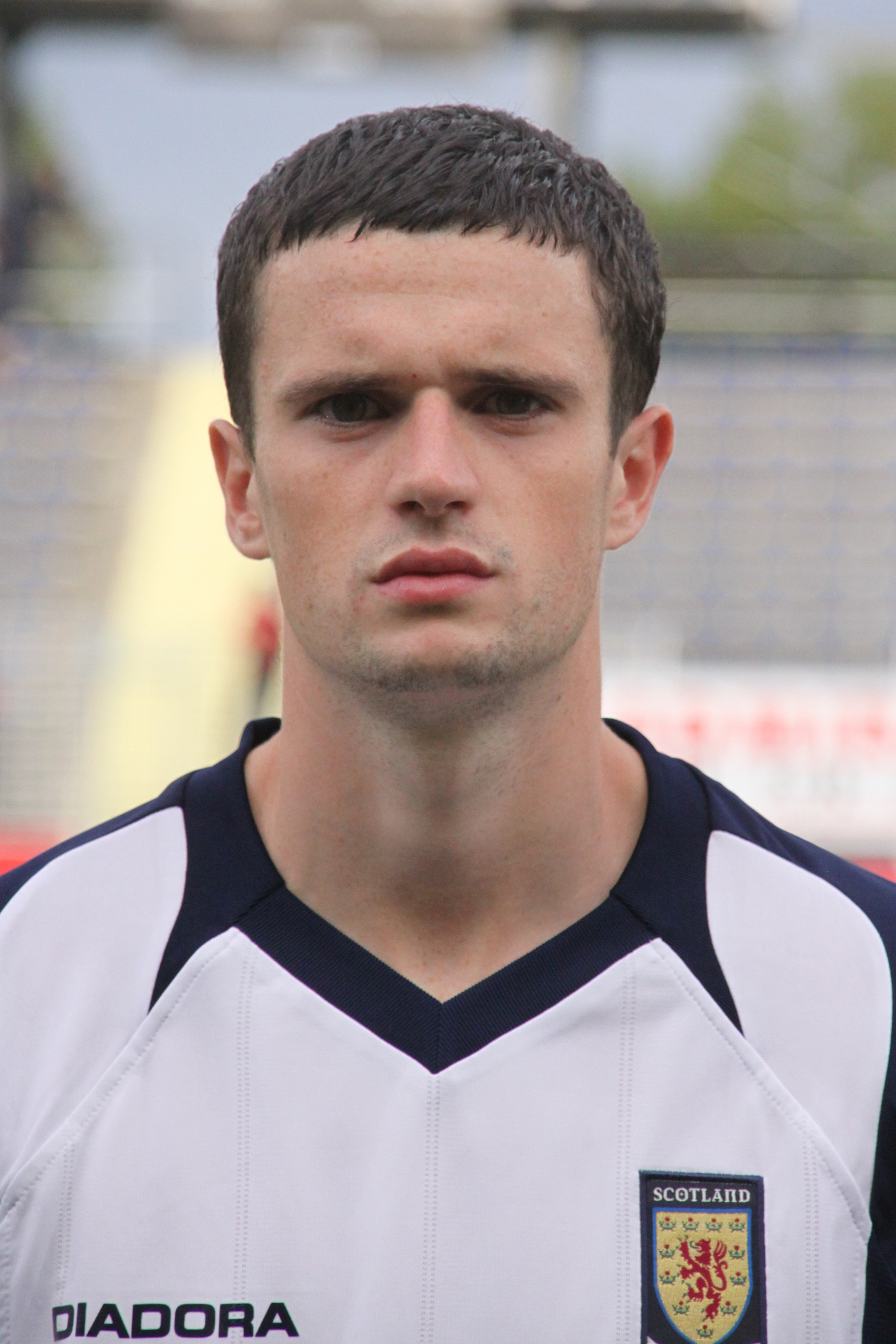
Scottish forward Jamie Murphy was signed from Motherwell during the transfer window.

The opening of the January transfer window allowed Danny Wilson to strengthen his squad by signing experienced defender Danny Higginbotham on a free transfer from Stoke City on New Years Day, and both he and Elliott Whitehouse made their United débuts for United that afternoon in the South Yorkshire derby against Doncaster Rovers at the Keepmoat Stadium where the Blades needed late goals from Blackman and Kitson to rescue a 2–2 draw. On 3 January Danny Wilson continued to revamp the squad by signing winger Jamie Murphy from Motherwell on a three-and-a-half-year contract for an undisclosed fee, whilst John Cofie's loan deal was terminated and he returned to his parent club Manchester United, despite claiming that he wanted to see out the season with the Blades. Young forward Diego De Girolamo was called up to the Italy national under-18 squad ahead of the Blade's third round FA Cup tie at Oxford United. Murphy made his Blades debut against Oxford United as they booked their place in the fourth round, running out 3–0 winners thanks to goals from McMahon, Kitson and Blackman, earning United a trip to the Madejski Stadium against Premier League strugglers Reading. United continued to struggle with injuries as defender Matt Hill was ruled out for six weeks with a fractured cheek bone following the game at Oxford. United's transfer dealings continued with midfielder David McAllister leaving the Blades for former loan club Shrewsbury Town for an undisclosed fee, Alfreton Town decided to extend Matty Harriott's loan for a third month, and youth keeper George Willis signed his first professional contract with the Blades on a two and half-year deal. United's disappointing league form continued as they were beaten 2–0 at home by Yeovil Town, and allowed Notts County to score a late equaliser to draw 1–1 despite being reduced to ten men for much of the game. With the transfer window close to completion United allowed young striker Danny Philliskirk to leave after cancelling his contract. With the Blades game at Bury postponed due to weather conditions, their next match was the FA Cup fourth round tie at Reading, a match which saw United crash out of the competition following a 4–0 defeat. With a day of the transfer window remaining Reading agreed a deal to sign Nick Blackman, only six months after he had arrived at Bramall Lane, and after he had rejected a move to Crystal Palace. On deadline day itself former United youth player Jonathan Forte returned to the Blades on loan for the rest of the season from Southampton and Scottish international Barry Robson signed a short-term deal until the end of the season.

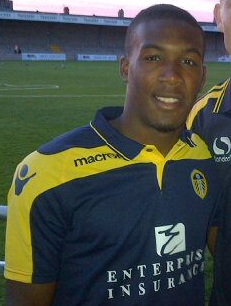
Dominic Poleon signed from Leeds United on loan.

=== February and March: Moving back up ===
United's poor home form continued into February as they suffered their third consecutive home loss, going down 2–1 to Coventry City. With United's home fixture against Crawley Town postponed due to a waterlogged pitch, the first time in ten years United had had to postpone a match for such a reason, their next fixture was an away trip to Shrewsbury Town where goals from Michael Doyle and Dave Kitson helped them to a 2–1 victory and their first league win of 2013. United registered back-to-back victories with a 2–0 away win over Bury, before signing young striker Dominic Poleon from Leeds United on loan until the end of the season, and allowing Chris Porter to sign a one-month loan deal with Shrewsbury Town. United climbed back into the automatic promotion places as they registered their first home win of 2013, beating Colchester United 3–0. On 18 February Coyne once again extended his stay with United keeping him at the Lane until late March. A fourth straight victory saw United return to the top of the table, leapfrogging their hosts Bournemouth after a 1–0 victory. Teenager Harry Maguire made his 100th start for the Blades in their next game, but United slipped back to second place following a 0–0 home draw with Leyton Orient.

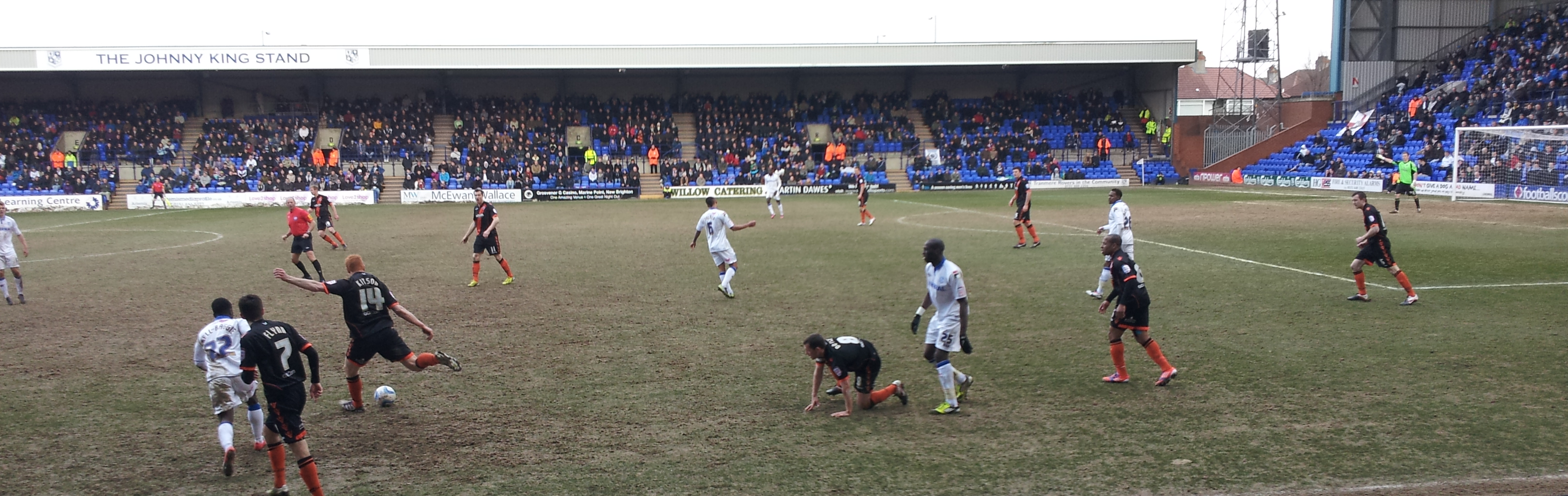
The Blades against Tranmere Rovers at Prenton Park on 29 March 2013.

March started with a 2–0 victory over Oldham Athletic, before the Blades managed to hold onto second place in the league, despite being held to a second consecutive 0–0 home draw, this time against Milton Keynes Dons. After United's scheduled trip to Crewe Alexandra was postponed due to a frozen pitch, Jordan Chapell was loaned out to Torquay United until the end of the season. The following day Chris Porter returned from his loan spell at Shrewsbury Town to increase United's striking options, before United's away run was brought to a halt as Stevenage beat them 4–0 at The Lamex Stadium. United signed young striker Joe Ironside to a two-and-a-half-year deal, before allowing Richard Cresswell to re-join his first ever club, York City, on a one-month loan deal. Later the same day former United player Jamie Hoyland resigned his post as Academy manager. Due to a lack of first team opportunities Erik Tønne was allowed to return to his native Norway for a trial with HamKam ahead of a potential loan move. A busy week off the field concluded with young keeper George Long being named Young Player of the Month for February 2013 by The Football League. United's fixture problems continued when their scheduled home game with Brentford was called off due to heavy snowfall, meaning that their first game for two weeks came against promotion rivals Tranmere Rovers, with an own goal from Tranmere's Ash Taylor being enough to secure the points for United.

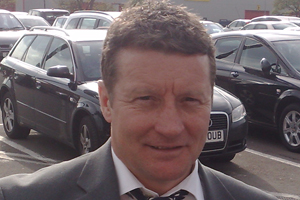
Danny Wilson was sacked as United manager in April.

=== April: Farewell Danny ===
April started with yet another goalless draw at Bramall Lane when Carlisle United held their hosts, despite being reduced to ten men for the final third of the game. Two days later on-loan forward Dominic Poleon was recalled by his parent club, Leeds United, while Erik Tønne was allowed to join Norwegian side HamKam on loan until November 2013. An away trip to Walsall provided yet another draw for United, with a second half goal from Chris Porter rescuing a point for the Blades. United continued their disappointing home form into the following game when Crawley Town were 2–0 victors, a result that saw Danny Wilson sacked the following day, and being replaced by reserve team coach Chris Morgan for the remainder of the season. The following day the club announced former player and Academy coach, David Unsworth as assistant to Morgan for the duration of his tenure. The new management team's first action was to recall Jordan Chapell from his loan spell at Torquay United. Chris Morgan's first game in charge saw Swindon Town visit Bramall Lane, with United running out as 2–0 winners, thanks to goals from Porter and Kitson. Following an injury to one of his Achilles tendons, Richard Cresswell returned early from his loan at York City, the day before a dramatic game home against Brentford saw three players sent off and four penalties awarded as the teams played out a 2–2 draw. On the penultimate weekend of the season United, saw their hopes of automatic promotion extinguished as they were beaten 3–0 by already relegated Portsmouth, although results elsewhere confirmed their place in the play-offs. Their poor form continued with a 1−0 away loss Crewe Alexandra, followed by yet another 0–0 home draw against Preston North End in the final game of the regular season. Meanwhile, Academy prospects Conor Dimaio and Jamie McDonagh were called up to the Ireland under–18s and the Northern Ireland under–19s respectively, while young defender Harry Maguire was named as the club's Player of the Year and was named in the PFA League One Team of the Year, winning both for the second season in succession.

=== May: Play-off Misery again ===
Having finished fifth in the final table, United were paired with fourth place Yeovil Town in the play-off semi-final. The first leg was played at Bramall Lane, where a close game resulted in substitute Callum McFadzean scoring the only goal, giving United a slender advantage going into the second game. The second leg was another tight affair but United created few chances on goal and were beaten 2–0 by their hosts to record a seventh successive failure in play-off competitions.

== Squad ==
As of the end of the season

Note: Flags indicate national team as defined under FIFA eligibility rules; some limited exceptions apply. Players may hold more than one non-FIFA nationality.

No.	Pos.	Nation	Player
1	GK	ENG	Mark Howard
2	DF	ENG	Darryl Westlake
3	DF	HAI	Lecsinel Jean-François
4	DF	ENG	Danny Higginbotham
5	DF	ENG	Harry Maguire
6	DF	ENG	Matt Hill
7	MF	SCO	Ryan Flynn
8	MF	IRL	Michael Doyle (captain)
9	FW	ENG	Chris Porter
11	MF	SCO	Kevin McDonald
12	FW	ENG	Shaun Miller
14	FW	ENG	Dave Kitson
15	DF	SCO	Neill Collins (vice captain)
16	FW	BRB	Jonathan Forte (on loan from Southampton)
17	FW	ENG	Richard Cresswell

No.	Pos.	Nation	Player
18	MF	IRL	Matthew Harriott
19	MF	SCO	Barry Robson
21	FW	ENG	Jordan Chapell
23	FW	SCO	Jamie Murphy
24	FW	ENG	Joe Ironside
25	GK	ENG	George Long
26	MF	ENG	Callum McFadzean
27	MF	ENG	Elliott Whitehouse
29	DF	ENG	Tony McMahon
30	DF	ENG	Marcus Williams
32	DF	ENG	Terry Kennedy
33	DF	IRL	Aaron Barry
34	GK	ENG	George Willis
35	GK	WAL	Danny Coyne
36	FW	ITA	Diego De Girolamo

=== Out on loan ===
Note: Flags indicate national team as defined under FIFA eligibility rules; some limited exceptions apply. Players may hold more than one non-FIFA nationality.

No. / Pos. / Nation / Player; 20 / MF / NOR / Erik Tønne (on loan at HamKam)	No. / Pos. / Nation / Player

=== Players leaving before the end of the season ===
Note: Flags indicate national team as defined under FIFA eligibility rules; some limited exceptions apply. Players may hold more than one non-FIFA nationality.

No.	Pos.	Nation	Player
4	MF	SCO	Nick Montgomery
10	FW	ENG	Nick Blackman
19	FW	ENG	John Cofie (on loan from Manchester United)
16	MF	IRL	David McAllister

No.	Pos.	Nation	Player
22	FW	ENG	Danny Philliskirk
22	FW	ENG	Dominic Poleon (on loan from Leeds United)
23	FW	SCO	Paul Gallagher (on loan from Leicester City)
28	MF	IRL	Stephen Quinn

== Transfers and contracts ==
=== In ===
==== Summer ====
Squad #	Position	Player	Transferred from	Fee	Date	Source
2	DF	(England) Darryl Westlake	(England) Walsall	Tribunal	20 July 2012	
6	DF	(England) Matt Hill	(England) Blackpool	Free	30 July 2012	
29	DF	(England) Tony McMahon	(England) Middlesbrough	Free	30 July 2012	
12	FW	(England) Shaun Miller	(England) Crewe Alexandra	£60,000	30 July 2012	
10	FW	(England) Nick Blackman	(England) Blackburn Rovers	Undisclosed	10 August 2012	
14	FW	(England) Dave Kitson	(England) Portsmouth	Free	31 August 2012	
35	GK	(Wales) Danny Coyne	Free agent	Free	17 November 2012	

==== Winter ====
Squad #	Position	Player	Transferred from	Fee	Date	Source
4	DF	(England) Danny Higginbotham	(England) Stoke City	Free	1 January 2013	
23	FW	(Scotland) Jamie Murphy	(Scotland) Motherwell	£100,000	3 January 2013	
19	MF	(Scotland) Barry Robson	(Canada) Vancouver Whitecaps	Free	31 January 2013	

==== Loan in ====
Squad #	Position	Player	Loaned from	Start	End	Source
19	FW	(England) John Cofie	(England) Manchester United	13 July 2012	3 January 2013	
23	FW	(Scotland) Paul Gallagher	(England) Leicester City	13 September 2012	10 October 2013	
16	FW	(Barbados) Jonathan Forte	(England) Southampton	31 January 2013	30 June 2013	
22	FW	(England) Dominic Poleon	(England) Leeds United	13 February 2013	3 April 2013	

=== Out ===
==== Summer ====
Squad #	Position	Player	Transferred to	Fee	Date	Source
1	GK	(England) Steve Simonsen	(England) Preston North End	Released	30 May 2012	
6	DF	(Austria) Johannes Ertl	(England) Portsmouth	Released	30 May 2012	
9	FW	(Wales) Ched Evans	N/A	Released	30 May 2012	
10	FW	(England) James Beattie	(England) Accrington Stanley	Released	30 May 2012	
16	DF	(England) Andy Taylor	(England) Walsall	Released	30 May 2012	
23	DF	(Republic of Ireland) Seamus Conneely	(Republic of Ireland) Sligo Rovers	Released	30 May 2012	
—	DF	(Australia) Marc Warren	(Scotland) Airdrie United	Released	30 May 2012	
—	DF	(England) Connor Brown	(England) Oldham Athletic	Released	30 May 2012	
2	DF	(England) Matthew Lowton	(England) Aston Villa	Undisclosed	6 July 2012	
14	MF	(Jamaica) Lee Williamson	(England) Portsmouth	Released	12 July 2012	
5	DF	(England) Chris Morgan	Retired	N/A	24 July 2012	
28	MF	(Republic of Ireland) Stephen Quinn	(England) Hull City	Undisclosed	31 August 2012	
4	MF	(Scotland) Nick Montgomery	(Australia) Central Coast Mariners	Released	31 August 2012	

==== Winter ====
Squad #	Position	Player	Transferred to	Fee	Date	Source
16	MF	(Republic of Ireland) David McAllister	(England) Shrewsbury Town	Undisclosed	8 January 2013	
22	FW	(England) Danny Philliskirk	(England) Coventry City	Released	25 January 2013	
10	FW	(England) Nick Blackman	(England) Reading	Undisclosed	30 January 2013	

==== Loan out ====
Squad #	Position	Player	Loaned to	Start	End	Source
21	FW	(England) Jordan Chapell	Burton Albion	23 October 2012	3 December 2012	
18	MF	(Republic of Ireland) Matthew Harriott	Alfreton Town	12 November 2012	12 February 2013	
9	FW	(England) Chris Porter	Shrewsbury Town	13 February 2013	14 March 2013	
21	FW	(England) Jordan Chapell	Torquay United	13 March 2013	12 April 2013	
17	FW	(England) Richard Cresswell	York City	19 March 2013	15 April 2013	
20	FW	(Norway) Erik Tønne	HamKam	3 April 2013	30 November 2013	

=== Contracts ===
New contracts and contract extensions.

Player	Date	Length	Contracted until	Reference / Notes
(England) Jordan Chapell	5 July 2012	1 Year	Summer 2013	
(England) Chris Porter	5 July 2012	2 Years	Summer 2014	
(Scotland) Kevin McDonald	24 July 2012	2 Years	Summer 2014	
(England) Richard Cresswell	30 August 2012	1 Year	Summer 2013	Became player-coach
(Republic of Ireland) Michael Doyle	21 September 2012	3 Years	Summer 2015	
(Italy) Diego De Girolamo	29 October 2012	3 Years	Summer 2015	
(Scotland) Neill Collins	9 November 2012	2 Years	Summer 2015	
(England) Dave Kitson	16 November 2012	6 Months	Summer 2013	
(Wales) Danny Coyne	17 December 2012	1 Month	January 2013	
(England) George Willis	11 January 2013	2 Years, 6 Months	Summer 2015	
(Wales) Danny Coyne	12 January 2013	1 Month	February 2013	
(Wales) Danny Coyne	18 February 2013	1 Month	March 2013	
(England) Joe Ironside	18 March 2013	2 years, 6 months	June 2015	

== League table ==
Pos	Team	Pld	W	D	L	GF	GA	GD	Pts	Promotion, qualification or relegation
3	Brentford	46	21	16	9	62	47	+15	79	Qualification for League One play-offs (Note: Four teams play for one spot and promotion to Football League Championship.)
4	Yeovil Town (O, P)	46	23	8	15	71	56	+15	77	Qualification for League One play-offs
5	Sheffield United	46	19	18	9	56	42	+14	75	Qualification for League One play-offs
6	Swindon Town	46	20	14	12	72	39	+33	74	Qualification for League One play-offs
7	Leyton Orient	46	21	8	17	55	48	+7	71	

Updated to match(es) played on 27 April 2013. Source: BBC Sport
Rules for classification: 1) Points; 2) Goal difference; 3) Number of goals scored
(O) Play-off winners; (P) Promoted

== Season firsts ==
=== Player début ===
Players making their first team Sheffield United début in a fully competitive match.

Squad #	Position	Player	Date	Opponents	Ground	Notes
1	GK	(England) Mark Howard	11 August 2012	Burton Albion	Bramall Lane	League Cup
12	FW	(England) Shaun Miller	11 August 2012	Burton Albion	Bramall Lane	League Cup
29	DF	(England) Tony McMahon	11 August 2012	Burton Albion	Bramall Lane	League Cup
10	FW	(England) Nick Blackman	11 August 2012	Burton Albion	Bramall Lane	Sub, League Cup
26	MF	(England) Callum McFadzean	11 August 2012	Burton Albion	Bramall Lane	Sub, League Cup
19	FW	(England) John Cofie	18 August 2012	Shrewsbury Town	Bramall Lane	
2	DF	(England) Darryl Westlake	15 September 2012	Bury	Bramall Lane	
23	MF	(Scotland) Paul Gallagher	15 September 2012	Bury	Bramall Lane	
14	FW	(England) Dave Kitson	15 September 2012	Bury	Bramall Lane	Sub
24	FW	(England) Joe Ironside	17 October 2012	Notts County	Meadow Lane	Sub, Football League Trophy
36	FW	(Italy) Diego De Girolamo	4 December 2012	Coventry City	Ricoh Arena	Sub, Football League Trophy
4	DF	(England) Danny Higginbotham	1 January 2013	Doncaster Rovers	Keepmoat Stadium	
27	DF	(England) Elliott Whitehouse	1 January 2013	Doncaster Rovers	Keepmoat Stadium	
23	FW	(Scotland) Jamie Murphy	5 January 2013	Oxford United	Kassam Stadium	FA Cup
19	MF	(Scotland) Barry Robson	1 February 2013	Coventry City	Bramall Lane	Sub
22	FW	(England) Dominic Poleon	16 February 2013	Colchester United	Bramall Lane	Sub

=== Début goal ===
Players scoring their first goal for Sheffield United in a competitive fixture.

Squad #	Position	Player	Date	Opponents	Ground	Notes
10	FW	(England) Nick Blackman	11 August 2012	Burton Albion	Bramall Lane	League Cup
19	FW	(England) John Cofie	24 August 2012	Colchester United	Colchester Community Stadium	
14	FW	(England) Dave Kitson	29 September 2012	Notts County	Bramall Lane	
23	FW	(Scotland) Paul Gallagher	2 October 2012	Hartlepool United	Victoria Park	
12	FW	(England) Shaun Miller	17 October 2012	Notts County	Meadow Lane	Football League Trophy
12	DF	(England) Tony McMahon	22 December 2012	Crawley Town	Broadfield Stadium	Free-kick
23	FW	(Scotland) Jamie Murphy	12 February 2013	Bury	Gigg Lane	
19	MF	(Scotland) Barry Robson	16 February 2013	Colchester United	Bramall Lane	Penalty
26	MF	(England) Callum McFadzean	3 May 2013	Yeovil Town	Bramall Lane	Play-offs

=== Competitive fixture ===
First ever meeting of the two clubs in a competitive fixture.

Opposition	Date	Venue	Result	Score	Notes
Crawley Town	22 December 2012	Broadfield Stadium	Win	0–2	

=== Stadia ===
First ever visit to a stadium for a competitive fixture

Venue	Opposition	Date	Result	Score	Notes
Memorial Stadium	Bristol Rovers	3 November 2012	Win	1–2	FA Cup
Broadfield Stadium	Crawley Town	22 December 2012	Win	0–2	
Kassam Stadium	Oxford United	5 January 2013	Win	0–3	FA Cup
New Meadow	Shrewsbury Town	9 February 2013	Win	1–2	

== Squad statistics ==
=== Appearances and goals ===
As of 6 May 2013

No.	Pos	Nat	Player	Total		League One/ Play-offs		FA Cup		League Cup		FL Trophy	
No.	Pos	Nat	Player	Apps	Goals	Apps	Goals	Apps	Goals	Apps	Goals	Apps	Goals
1	GK	(England) ENG	Mark Howard	12	0	11+0	0	0	0	1	0	0	0
2	DF	(England) ENG	Darryl Westlake	17	0	10+3	0	2	0	0	0	2	0
3	DF	(Haiti) HAI	Lecsinel Jean-François	1	0	0	0	0	0	0	0	0+1	0
4	DF	(England) ENG	Danny Higginbotham	18	0	13+3	0	2	0	0	0	0	0
5	DF	(England) ENG	Harry Maguire	52	5	45	3	4	0	1	0	2	2
6	DF	(England) ENG	Matt Hill	41	0	36	0	3	0	0	0	2	0
7	MF	(Scotland) SCO	Ryan Flynn	44	3	36+1	3	3+1	0	1+0	0	2+0	0
8	MF	(Republic of Ireland) IRL	Michael Doyle	52	3	45	3	4	0	1	0	2	0
9	FW	(England) ENG	Chris Porter	28	4	15+8	3	3	1	1	0	1	0
11	MF	(Scotland) SCO	Kevin McDonald	51	1	47	1	3	0	1	0	0	0
12	FW	(England) ENG	Shaun Miller	19	8	7+8	4	2	2	1	0	1	2
14	FW	(England) ENG	Dave Kitson	36	12	30+4	11	2	1	0	0	0	0
15	DF	(Scotland) SCO	Neill Collins	45	5	40+1	4	2+1	0	1	1	0	0
16	FW	(Barbados) BRB	Jonathan Forte	12	1	7+5	1	0	0	0	0	0	0
17	FW	(England) ENG	Richard Cresswell	20	1	2+14	1	0+3	0	0	0	1	0
18	MF	(Republic of Ireland) IRL	Matthew Harriott	1	0	0	0	0	0	0	0	1	0
19	MF	(Scotland) SCO	Barry Robson	18	2	11+7	2	0	0	0	0	0	0
20	MF	(Norway) NOR	Erik Tønne	0	0	0	0	0	0	0	0	0	0
21	FW	(England) ENG	Jordan Chapell	4	0	0+2	0	0	0	0	0	1+1	0
23	FW	(Scotland) SCO	Jamie Murphy	21	2	17+2	2	2	0	0	0	0	0
24	FW	(England) ENG	Joe Ironside	17	0	2+12	0	0+1	0	0	0	0+2	0
25	GK	(England) ENG	George Long	44	0	37+1	0	4	0	0	0	2	0
26	MF	(England) ENG	Callum McFadzean	12	1	3+7	1	0	0	0+1	0	1	0
27	MF	(England) ENG	Elliott Whitehouse	5	0	1+3	0	0+1	0	0	0	0	0
29	DF	(England) ENG	Tony McMahon	42	3	38	2	3	1	1	0	0	0
30	DF	(England) ENG	Marcus Williams	24	0	14+4	0	0+3	0	1	0	2	0
32	DF	(England) ENG	Terry Kennedy	1	0	1	0	0	0	0	0	0	0
33	DF	(Republic of Ireland) IRL	Aaron Barry	0	0	0	0	0	0	0	0	0	0
34	GK	(England) ENG	George Willis	0	0	0	0	0	0	0	0	0	0
35	GK	(Wales) WAL	Danny Coyne	0	0	0	0	0	0	0	0	0	0
36	FW	(Italy) ITA	Diego De Girolamo	3	0	0+2	0	0	0	0	0	0+1	0
Players who left before the end of the season:
4	MF	(Scotland) SCO	Nick Montgomery	0	0	0	0	0	0	0	0	0	0
10	FW	(England) ENG	Nick Blackman	33	14	28	11	4	2	0+1	1	0	0
16	MF	(Republic of Ireland) IRL	David McAllister	17	2	10+4	1	1	0	0+1	0	1	1
19	FW	(England) ENG	John Cofie	18	2	8+8	2	0+1	0	0	0	1	0
22	FW	(England) ENG	Danny Philliskirk	2	0	0+1	0	0	0	0	0	0+1	0
22	FW	(England) ENG	Dominic Poleon	7	0	3+4	0	0	0	0	0	0	0
23	MF	(Scotland) SCO	Paul Gallagher	6	1	6	1	0	0	0	0	0	0
28	MF	(Republic of Ireland) IRL	Stephen Quinn	4	0	3	0	0	0	1	0	0	0

=== Top scorers ===
Place	Number	Nation	Position	Name	League One	Play-offs	FA Cup	League Cup	FL Trophy	Total
1	10	(England)	FW	Nick Blackman	11	0	2	1	0	14
2	14	(England)	FW	Dave Kitson	11	0	1	0	0	12
3	12	(England)	FW	Shaun Miller	4	0	2	0	2	8
4	15	(Scotland)	DF	Neill Collins	4	0	0	1	0	5
4	5	(England)	DF	Harry Maguire	3	0	0	0	2	5
5	9	(England)	FW	Chris Porter	3	0	1	0	0	4
6	8	(Republic of Ireland)	MF	Michael Doyle	3	0	0	0	0	3
6	7	(Scotland)	MF	Ryan Flynn	3	0	0	0	0	3
6	29	(England)	DF	Tony McMahon	2	0	1	0	0	3
7	19	(England)	FW	John Cofie	2	0	0	0	0	2
7	16	(Republic of Ireland)	MF	David McAllister	1	0	0	0	1	2
7	23	(Scotland)	FW	Jamie Murphy	2	0	0	0	0	2
7	19	(Scotland)	MF	Barry Robson	2	0	0	0	0	2
8	17	(England)	FW	Richard Cresswell	1	0	0	0	0	1
8	16	(Barbados)	FW	Jonathan Forte	1	0	0	0	0	1
8	23	(Scotland)	FW	Paul Gallagher	1	0	0	0	0	1
8	11	(Scotland)	MF	Kevin McDonald	1	0	0	0	0	1
8	26	(England)	MF	Callum McFadzean	0	1	0	0	0	1
				TOTALS	54	1	7	2	5	69

=== Disciplinary record ===
Number	Nation	Position	Name	League One		Play-offs		FA Cup		League Cup		JP Trophy		Total	
Number	Nation	Position	Name	Yellow card	Red card	Yellow card	Red card	Yellow card	Red card	Yellow card	Red card	Yellow card	Red card	Yellow card	Red card
5	(England)	DF	Harry Maguire	10	1	2	0	0	0	0	0	0	0	12	1
11	(Scotland)	MF	Kevin McDonald	10	0	1	0	1	0	0	0	0	0	12	0
29	(England)	DF	Tony McMahon	11	0	0	0	0	0	0	0	0	0	11	0
8	(Republic of Ireland)	MF	Michael Doyle	6	1	1	0	1	0	0	0	0	0	7	1
14	(England)	FW	Dave Kitson	7	0	1	0	0	0	0	0	0	0	8	0
6	(England)	DF	Matt Hill	7	0	0	0	0	0	0	0	0	0	7	0
15	(Scotland)	DF	Neill Collins	3	0	0	0	0	0	1	0	0	0	4	0
7	(Scotland)	MF	Ryan Flynn	1	1	0	0	0	0	0	0	0	0	1	1
12	(England)	FW	Shaun Miller	2	0	0	0	2	0	0	0	0	0	4	0
10	(England)	FW	Nick Blackman	3	0	0	0	0	0	0	0	0	0	3	0
19	(Scotland)	MF	Barry Robson	3	0	0	0	0	0	0	0	0	0	3	0
25	(England)	GK	George Long	2	0	0	0	0	0	0	0	0	0	2	0
23	(Scotland)	FW	Paul Gallagher	1	0	0	0	0	0	0	0	0	0	1	0
18	(Republic of Ireland)	MF	Matthew Harriott	0	0	0	0	0	0	0	0	1	0	1	0
26	(England)	MF	Callum McFadzean	1	0	0	0	0	0	0	0	0	0	1	0
9	(England)	FW	Chris Porter	1	0	0	0	0	0	0	0	0	0	1	0
28	(Republic of Ireland)	MF	Stephen Quinn	1	0	0	0	0	0	0	0	0	0	1	0
27	(England)	MF	Elliott Whitehouse	1	0	0	0	0	0	0	0	0	0	1	0
30	(England)	DF	Marcus Williams	1	0	0	0	0	0	0	0	0	0	1	0
			TOTALS	70	3	3	0	4	0	1	0	1	0	79	3

==== Suspensions ====
Squad #	Position	Player	Suspension	Start date	Reason	Source
8	MF	(Republic of Ireland) Michael Doyle	3 games	8 September 2012	Red card – dangerous play	
7	MF	(Scotland) Ryan Flynn	3 games	8 September 2012	Red card – dangerous play	
11	MF	(Scotland) Kevin McDonald	1 game	23 November 2012	5 yellow cards to date	
29	DF	(England) Tony McMahon	1 game	26 December 2012	5 yellow cards to date	
5	DF	(England) Harry Maguire	1 game	29 December 2012	5 yellow cards to date	
29	DF	(England) Tony McMahon	2 games	1 April 2013	10 yellow cards to date	
5	DF	(England) Harry Maguire	1 game	16 April 2013	Red card – second bookable offence	

Date of start of suspension assumed to be the date of the game during which the disciplinary incident occurred.

=== International Call-ups ===
No.	P	Name	Squad	Competition	Opposition	Date	Cap	Goals	Notes
5	DF	Harry Maguire	England U21	Friendly	Northern Ireland U21	13 November 2012	Y	0	Sub
36	FW	Diego De Girolamo	Italy U18	Granatkin Memorial Cup	Belgium U18	6 January 2013	Y	0	Sub
36	FW	Diego De Girolamo	Italy U18	Granatkin Memorial Cup	Belarus U18	8 January 2013	Y	0	Sub
36	FW	Diego De Girolamo	Italy U18	Granatkin Memorial Cup	(Russia) Saint-Petersburg U18	10 January 2013	Y	0	Sub
36	FW	Diego De Girolamo	Italy U18	Granatkin Memorial Cup	Iran U18	11 January 2013	Y	1	
36	FW	Diego De Girolamo	Italy U18	Granatkin Memorial Cup	Czech Republic U18	13 January 2013	Y	1	
36	FW	Diego De Girolamo	Italy U18	Friendly	Austria U18	6 March 2013	Y	1	
–	MF	Jamie McDonagh	Northern Ireland U19	Friendly	Wales U19	1 May 2013			

== Matches ==
=== Key ===
Win Draw Loss

=== Football League One ===
18 August 2012	Sheffield United	1–0	Shrewsbury Town	Bramall Lane
15:00	McAllister 4'	(Report)		Attendance: 18,286

21 August 2012	Coventry City	1–1	Sheffield United	Ricoh Arena
19:45	Elliott 62'	(Report)	Blackman 84'	Attendance: 12,621

25 August 2012	Colchester United	1–1	Sheffield United	Colchester Community Stadium
15:00	Morrison 72'	(Report)	Cofie 17'	Attendance: 4,017

1 September 2012	Sheffield United	5–3	Bournemouth	Bramall Lane
15:00	Flynn 24', 31'; Cofie 43'; Cresswell 60'; Blackman 90+3' (pen.)	(Report)	Elphick 20'; Barnard 48'; Pugh 87'	Attendance: 18,790

8 September 2012	Scunthorpe United	1–1	Sheffield United	Glanford Park
15:00	Clarke 60'	(Report)	Collins 83'; Doyle (red card) 14'; Flynn (red card) 71'	Attendance: 5,533

15 September 2012	Sheffield United	1–1	Bury	Bramall Lane
15:00	Blackman 10'	(Report)	Sweeney 12'	Attendance: 16,866

18 September 2012	Sheffield United	0–0	Doncaster Rovers	Bramall Lane
17:45		(Report)		Attendance: 17,925

22 September 2012	Yeovil Town	0–1	Sheffield United	Huish Park
15:00		(Report)	Collins 55'	Attendance: 4,117

29 September 2012	Sheffield United	1–1	Notts County	Bramall Lane
15:00	Kitson 51'	(Report)	L. Hughes 57'	Attendance: 18,814

2 October 2012	Hartlepool United	1–2	Sheffield United	Victoria Park
19:45	S. Howard 78'	(Report)	Kitson 27'; Gallagher 89'	Attendance: 4,027

6 October 2012	Leyton Orient	0–1	Sheffield United	Matchroom Stadium
15:00		(Report)	Blackman 59'	Attendance: 4,882

13 October 2012	Sheffield United	1–1	Oldham Athletic	Bramall Lane
15:00	Blackman 52' (pen.)	(Report)	Smith 90+6'	Attendance: 18,188

20 October 2012	Preston North End	0–1	Sheffield United	Deepdale
15:00		(Report)	Kitson 43'	Attendance: 11,536

23 October 2012	Sheffield United	1–0	Walsall	Bramall Lane
19:45	Blackman 14' (pen.)	(Report)	Holden (red card) 13'	Attendance: 15,744

29 October 2012	Sheffield United	1–0	Portsmouth	Bramall Lane
19:45	Blackman 66' (pen.)	(Report)		Attendance: 18,946

6 November 2012	Swindon Town	0–0	Sheffield United	The County Ground
19:45		(Report)		Attendance: 8,354

10 November 2012	Milton Keynes Dons	1–0	Sheffield United	Stadium mk
15:00	S. Williams 90' (pen.)	(Report)		Attendance: 9,835

17 November 2012	Sheffield United	4–1	Stevenage	Bramall Lane
15:00	Collins 19'; Miller 55', 70'; Porter 87'	(Report)	Roberts 45'	Attendance: 17,984

20 November 2012	Sheffield United	3–3	Crewe Alexandra	Bramall Lane
17:45	Miller 4'; Maguire 30'; Blackman 51'	(Report)	Ellis 42'; Pogba 45'; Aneke 47'	Attendance: 16,000

24 November 2012	Brentford	2–0	Sheffield United	Griffin Park
15:00	Donaldson 3'; Forrester 29'	(Report)		Attendance: 7,763

8 December 2012	Carlisle United	1–3	Sheffield United	Brunton Park
15:00	Livesey 71'	(Report)	Flynn 16'; Blackman 34'; Collins 84'	Attendance: 4,892

15 December 2012	Sheffield United	0–0	Tranmere Rovers	Bramall Lane
15:00		(Report)		Attendance: 19,163

22 December 2012	Crawley Town	0–2	Sheffield United	Broadfield Stadium
15:00		(Report)	McMahon 29', 72'	Attendance: 4,604

26 December 2012	Sheffield United	3–0	Scunthorpe United	Bramall Lane
15:00	Miller 4'; Kitson 56'; Blackman 84' (pen.)	(Report)		Attendance: 21,819

29 December 2012	Sheffield United	2–3	Hartlepool United	Bramall Lane
15:00	Doyle 30'; Maguire 90+5'	(Report)	Howard 7', 72'; Humphreys 54'	Attendance: 19,941

1 January 2013	Doncaster Rovers	2–2	Sheffield United	Keepmoat Stadium
15:00	Paynter 18' (pen.); Syers 63'; Paynter (red card) 86'	(Report)	Blackman 80' (pen.); Kitson 89'	Attendance: 12,785

12 January 2013	Sheffield United	0–2	Yeovil Town	Bramall Lane
15:00		(Report)	Madden 49', 66'	Attendance: 20,454

19 January 2013	Notts County	1–1	Sheffield United	Meadow Lane
15:00	Judge 80'; Zoko (red card) 24'	(Report)	Maguire 2'	Attendance: 7,061

1 February 2013	Sheffield United	1–2	Coventry City	Bramall Lane
19:45	Kitson 72'	(Report)	Clarke 14', 87'	Attendance: 17,511

9 February 2013	Shrewsbury Town	1–2	Sheffield United	New Meadow
15:00	McGinn 88'	(Report)	Doyle 63'; Kitson 72'	Attendance: 7,232

12 February 2013	Bury	0–2	Sheffield United	Gigg Lane
19:45		(Report)	Forte 38'; Murphy 60'	Attendance: 3,064

16 February 2013	Sheffield United	3–0	Colchester United	Bramall Lane
15:00	Robson 4' (pen.); McDonald 73'; Kitson 90'	(Report)		Attendance: 16,860

23 February 2013	Bournemouth	0–1	Sheffield United	Dean Court
15:00		(Report)	Murphy 20'	Attendance: 8,497

26 February 2013	Sheffield United	0–0	Leyton Orient	Bramall Lane
15:00		(Report)		Attendance: 16,540

2 March 2013	Oldham Athletic	0–2	Sheffield United	Boundary Park
15:00		(Report)	Doyle 57'; Kitson 86'	Attendance: 6,426

9 March 2013	Sheffield United	0–0	MK Dons	Bramall Lane
15:00		(Report)		Attendance: 17,936

16 March 2013	Stevenage	4–0	Sheffield United	Broadhall Way
15:00	López 41', 50', 64'; Akins 69'	(Report)		Attendance: 3,483

29 March 2013	Tranmere Rovers	0–1	Sheffield United	Prenton Park
15:00		(Report)	Taylor 47' (o.g.)	Attendance: 9,145

1 April 2013	Sheffield United	0–0	Carlisle United	Bramall Lane
15:00		(Report)	O'Hanlon (yellow card) 74' (yellow-red card)	Attendance: 19,005

6 April 2013	Walsall	1–1	Sheffield United	Bescot Stadium
15:00	Westcarr 44'	(Report)	Porter 65'	Attendance: 7,042

9 April 2013	Sheffield United	0–2	Crawley Town	Bramall Lane
19:45		(Report)	Clarke 77'; Hayes 84'	Attendance: 18,680

13 April 2013	Sheffield United	2–0	Swindon Town	Bramall Lane
15:00	Porter 37'; Kitson 82'	(Report)		Attendance: 19,298

16 April 2013	Sheffield United	2–2	Brentford	Bramall Lane
19:45	Robson 62' (pen.); Kitson 62'; Maguire (yellow card) 72' (yellow-red card)	(Report)	Trotta 24' (pen.); Craig (red card) 51'; Donaldson (yellow card) 77' (yellow-red card); Wright-Phillips 89'	Attendance: 23,431

20 April 2013	Portsmouth	3–0	Sheffield United	Fratton Park
15:00	Cooper 21'; Connolly 24'; Wallace 32'	(Report)		Attendance: 18,433

23 April 2013	Crewe Alexandra	1–0	Sheffield United	Alexandra Stadium
19:45	Aneke 49'	(Report)		Attendance: 5,379

27 April 2013	Sheffield United	0–0	Preston North End	Bramall Lane
15:00		(Report)		Attendance: 19,888

=== Play-offs ===
3 May 2013 Semi Final (1st leg)	Sheffield United	1–0	Yeovil Town	Bramall Lane
19:45	McFadzean 46'	(Report)		Attendance: 15,262

6 May 2013 Semi Final (2nd leg)	Yeovil Town	2–0	Sheffield United	Huish Park
	Dawson 6'; Upson 85'	(Report)		Attendance: 8,152

=== FA Cup ===
3 November 2012 Round 1	Bristol Rovers	1–2	Sheffield United	Memorial Stadium
15:00	Clarkson 5'	(Report)	Blackman 53'; Porter 62'	Attendance: 4,712

1 December 2012 Round 2	Sheffield United	2–1	Port Vale	Bramall Lane
15:00	Miller 90', 90+5'	(Report)	Pope 33'	Attendance: 10,215

5 January 2013 Round 3	Oxford United	0–3	Sheffield United	Kassam Stadium
15:00		(Report)	McMahon 17'; Kitson 68'; Blackman 87'	Attendance: 7,079

26 January 2013 Round 4	Reading	4–0	Sheffield United	Madejski Stadium
15:00	Hunt 6', 50'; Leigertwood 40'; McCleary 54'	(Report)		Attendance: 14,715

=== Football League Cup ===
11 August 2012 Round 1	Sheffield United	2–2 (a.e.t.) (4–5 p)	Burton Albion	Bramall Lane
15:00	Blackman 51'; Collins 105'	(Report)	Yussuf 34'; Taylor 97'; Holness (yellow card) 90' (yellow-red card)	Attendance: 7,073
	Penalties
	Quinn (penalty scored); Collins (penalty scored); Maguire (penalty missed); McDonald (penalty scored); McMahon (penalty scored); Doyle (penalty missed)		(penalty scored) Weir; (penalty missed) Bell; (penalty scored) McCrory; (penalty scored) Webster; (penalty scored) Richards; (penalty scored) Taylor

=== Football League Trophy ===
17 October 2012 Round 2	Notts County	1–4	Sheffield United	Meadow Lane
19:45	Stewart 75'	(Report)	Miller 24', 52'; Maguire 45', 54'	Attendance: 2,082

4 December 2012 Quarter Final	Coventry City	1–1 (4–1 p)	Sheffield United	Ricoh Arena
19:45	Maguire 58' (o.g.)	(Report)	McAllister 81'	Attendance: 10,162
	Penalties
	McSheffrey (penalty scored); McGoldrick (penalty scored); Baker (penalty scored); Fleck (penalty scored)		(penalty scored) Ironside; (penalty missed) Maguire; (penalty missed) Flynn

=== Pre-Season and friendlies ===
18 July 2012	Ilkeston	1–1	Sheffield United	New Manor Ground
19:45	J Maguire	(Report)	H Maguire 57'	Attendance: 899

23 July 2012	Zejtun Corinthians (Malta)	0–6	Sheffield United	Ta' Qali National Stadium
19:00		(Report)	Ironside 2'; Collins 9'; Tønne 23'; Quinn 57'; Pisani 79' (o.g.); Cofie 81'

25 July 2012	Hibernians (Malta)	0–0	Sheffield United	Hibernians Stadium
19:30		(Report)

31 July 2012	Rotherham United	0–1	Sheffield United	New York Stadium
20:00		(Report)	Cofie 40'

2 August 2012	Hallam	0–4	Sheffield United XI	Sandygate Road
19:45		(Report)	Ironside 8', 17'; Philliskirk 87', 89'	Attendance: 480

4 August 2012	Morecambe	0–2	Sheffield United	Globe Arena
15:00		(Report)	McMahon 28'; Ironside 88'

7 August 2012	Matlock Town	0–1	Sheffield United XI	Causeway Lane
19:45		(Report)	Tønne 54'

== Honours and awards ==
=== PFA League One Team of the Season ===
- Harry Maguire

=== Football League Young Player of the Month ===
- February: George Long

=== League One Manager of the Month ===
- October: Danny Wilson

=== League One Player of the Month ===
- October: George Long

=== League One Team of the Week ===
- 17/18 August: David McAllister, Marcus Williams
- 1/2 September: Ryan Flynn
- 8 September: Tony McMahon
- 15 September: Mark Howard
- 22 September: Neill Collins
- 6 October: Tony McMahon, Kevin McDonald
- 20 October: David McAllister
- 17 November: Shaun Miller
- 15 December: Harry Maguire
- 18/19 January: Harry Maguire
- 16 February: Neill Collins, Kevin McDonald
- 23/24 February: George Long
- 1/2 March: Harry Maguire
- 12/13 April: Neill Collins

=== Club end of season award ===
- Player of the Year: Harry Maguire
- Young Player of the Year: George Long
- Goal of the Season: Tony McMahon (v Crawley Town)
- Community Player of the Year: Neill Collins

=== Fans Player of the Month ===
- August: Nick Blackman
- September: Nick Blackman
- October: Dave Kitson
- November: George Long
- December: Nick Blackman
- January: Tony McMahon
- February: Dave Kitson
- March: George Long
