= 2012 Football League One play-off final =

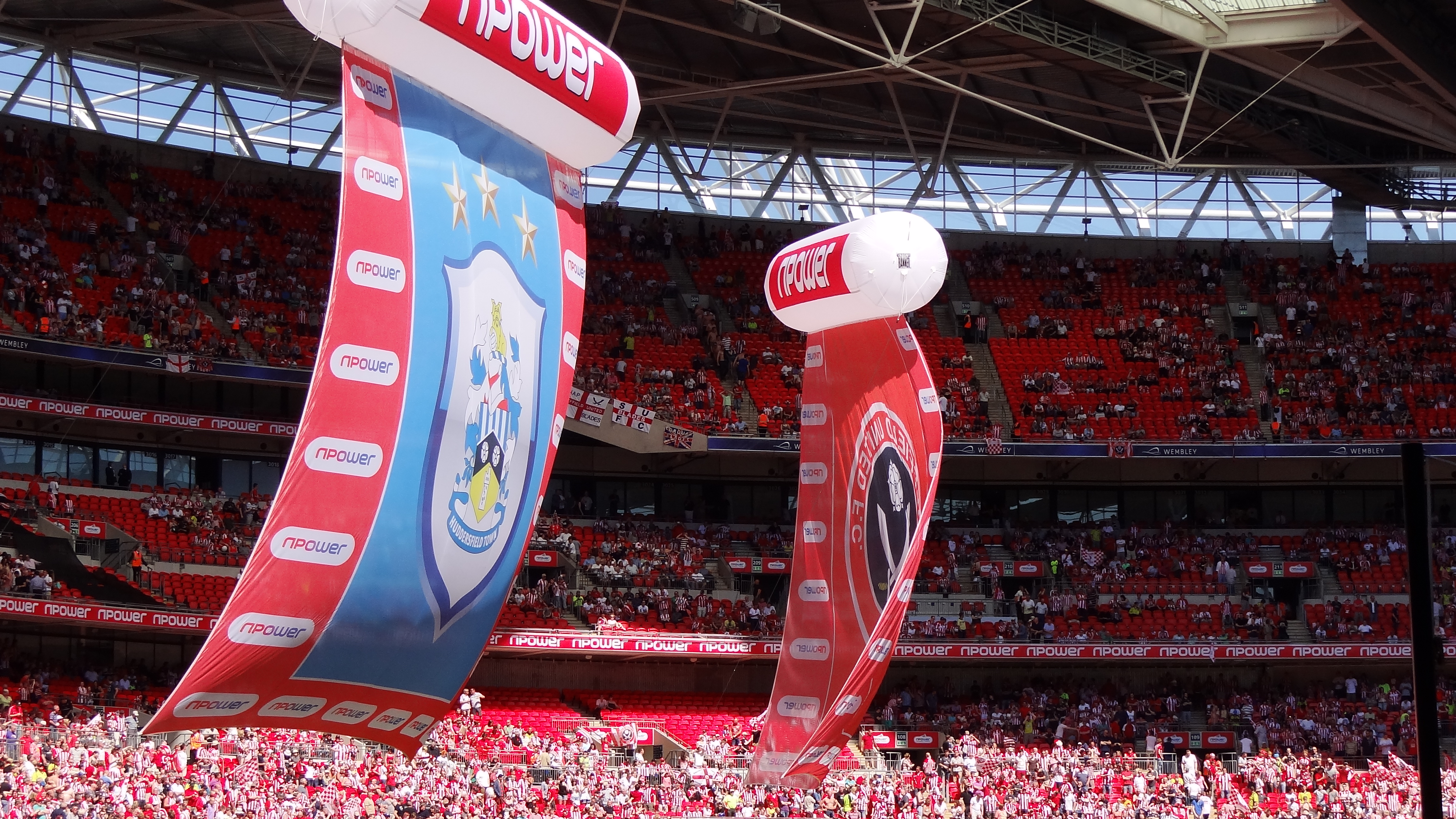
- Huddersfield Town and Sheffield United flags at Wembley
Huddersfield Town	Sheffield United
0	0
- Huddersfield won 8–7 on penalties
- Date: 26 May 2012
- Venue: Wembley Stadium, London
- Man of the Match: Peter Clarke (Huddersfield)
- Referee: Roger East
- Attendance: 52,100
- Weather: Sunny and warm

The 2012 Football League One play-off final was an association football match which was played on 26 May 2012 at Wembley Stadium, London, between Huddersfield Town and Sheffield United to determine the third and final team to gain promotion from Football League One to the Football League Championship. The top two teams of the 2011–12 Football League One season, Charlton Athletic and Sheffield Wednesday, gained automatic promotion to the Championship, while the teams placed from third to sixth position in the table took part in play-offs. The winners of the play-off semi-finals competed for the final place for the 2012–13 season in the Championship.

Roger East was the referee for the match which was played in front of 52,100 spectators. The match itself ended in a 0–0 draw and went into extra time. With no goals in the additional period of play, the match had to be decided with a penalty shootout. Six of the first eight penalties were missed or saved and the subsequent twelve were all scored. With the shootout level at 7–7, Huddersfield's goalkeeper Alex Smithies scored past his counterpart Steve Simonsen to give them the advantage. Simonsen then struck his penalty high over Smithies' crossbar and the shootout ended 8–7, with Huddersfield gaining promotion to the Championship.

Sheffield United ended their next season in fifth position in League One and participated in the play-offs where they lost to Yeovil Town in the semi-final. Huddersfield Town's following season saw them finish in 19th place in the Championship, three positions and four points above the relegation zone.

== Route to the final ==
Football League One final table, leading positions
Pos	Team	Pld	W	D	L	GF	GA	GD	Pts
1	Charlton Athletic	46	30	11	5	82	36	+46	101
2	Sheffield Wednesday	46	28	9	9	81	48	+33	93
3	Sheffield United	46	27	9	10	92	51	+41	90
4	Huddersfield Town	46	21	18	7	79	47	+32	81
5	Milton Keynes Dons	46	22	14	10	84	47	+37	80
6	Stevenage	46	18	19	9	69	44	+25	73

Sheffield United finished the regular 2011–12 season in third place in Football League One, the third tier of the English football league system, one place ahead of Huddersfield Town. Both therefore missed out on the two automatic places for promotion to the Football League Championship and instead took part in the play-offs to determine the third promoted team. Sheffield United finished three points behind local rivals Sheffield Wednesday (who were promoted in second place) and eleven behind league winners Charlton Athletic. Huddersfield Town ended the season nine points behind Sheffield United.

Sheffield United's opponents for their play-off semi-final were Stevenage and the first match of the two-legged tie took place at Broadhall Way in Stevenage on 11 May 2012. Craig Reid hit the frame of the Sheffield United goal and Stevenage's goalkeeper was forced to make a save from Michael Bostwick, his own player, but the game ended goalless. The return leg was held three days later at Bramall Lane in Sheffield. The first half ended without a goal but late in the second half, Chris Porter scored for the home side with a header from a Matthew Lowton cross to secure a 1–0 victory and progression for Sheffield United to the final.

Huddersfield Town faced Milton Keynes Dons in the other play-off semi-final with the first leg being played at Stadium MK in Milton Keynes on 12 May 2012. Midway through the first half, Jordan Rhodes gave the visitors the lead when he scored with a header from Lee Novak's cross. In the second half, an exchange of passes between Jack Hunt and Kallum Higginbotham led to Hunt striking from inside the MK Dons penalty area past David Martin in goal to make it 2–0. The second leg took place at the Galpharm Stadium in Huddersfield three days later. Rhodes put the visitors ahead with a free kick before Daniel Powell equalised from around 18 yards (16 m). Alan Smith scored a late header to give MK Dons a 2–1 win but Huddersfield progressed to the final with a 3–2 aggregate victory.

== Match ==
=== Background ===
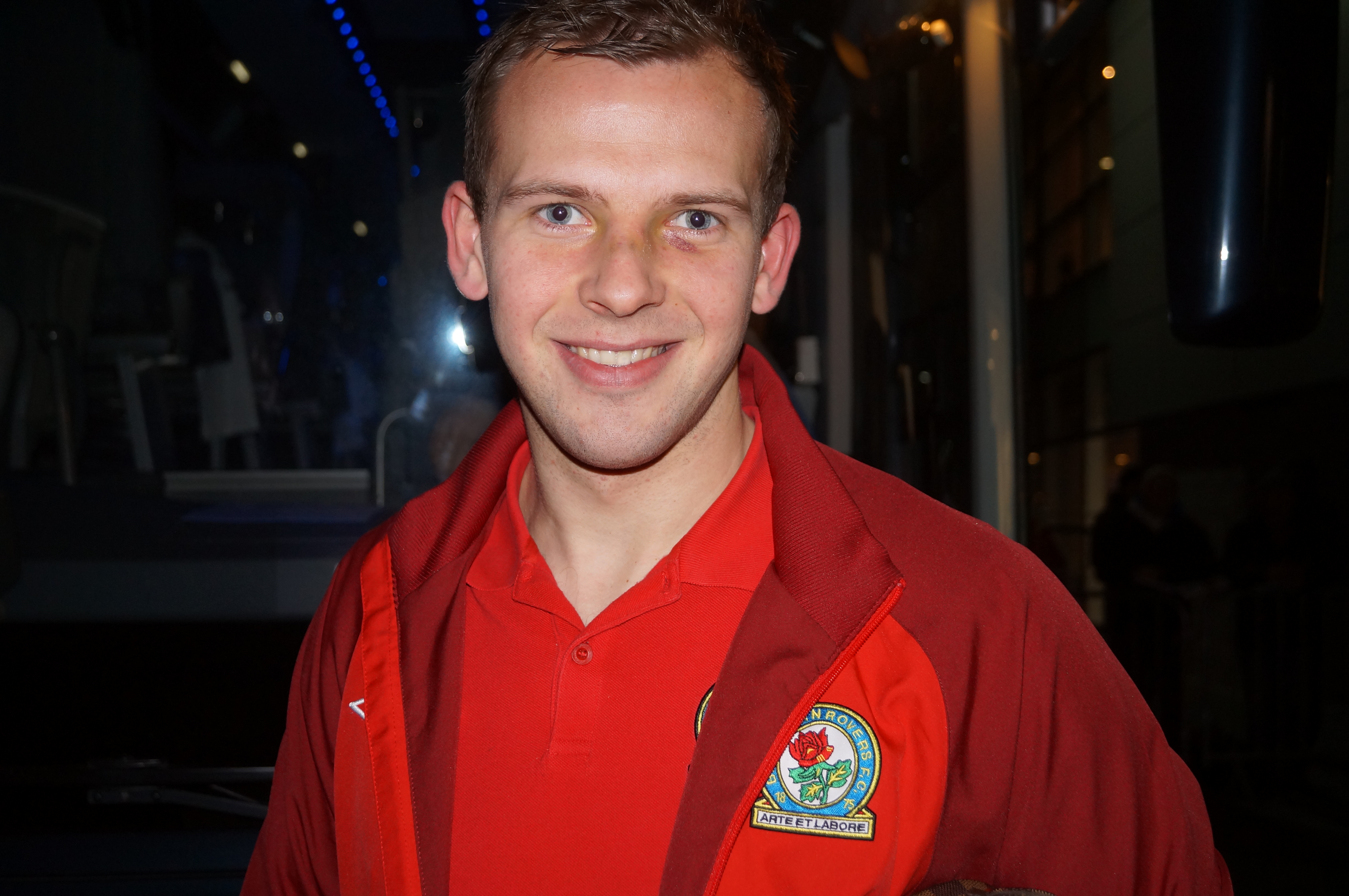
Jordan Rhodes (pictured in 2013) had scored 36 league goals in 40 matches for Huddersfield Town during the regular season.

This match was Huddersfield Town's fourth play-off final, their previous three coming in 1995 (a 2–1 win over Bristol Rovers), 2004 (a 4–1 penalty shoot-out win over Mansfield Town) and 2011 (a 3–0 loss to Peterborough United), and completed their eighth Football League play-off campaign. Manager Simon Grayson had previously achieved promotion success as a manager from the Football League One play-offs with Blackpool in the 2007 final. Sheffield United had been involved in six previous play-off campaigns, but had never won a play-off final despite attempts in 1997, 2003 and 2009.

The matches between the two teams during the regular season ended in an away win in both matches. Huddersfield secured a 3–0 victory away at Bramall Lane in September 2011, with goals from Oscar Gobern and a brace from Novak, while Sheffield United won 1–0 away at the Kirklees Stadium the following February with Neill Collins scoring the only goal. Ched Evans was top scorer for Sheffield United with 35 goals during the regular season (29 in the league, 5 in the FA Cup and 1 in the Football League Trophy). However he was unavailable for selection after being convicted of rape in April 2012; the conviction was quashed four years later following a retrial. Huddersfield Town's leading scorer was Rhodes who had scored 36 league goals in 40 appearances and 2 in the League Cup.

Huddersfield's goalkeeper Ian Bennett injured his hand during the semi-final second leg against MK Dons, with Alex Smithies on standby as his replacement. Scott Arfield had recovered from the ankle injury that forced him off in the semi-final first leg and later saw him to miss the home tie. Sheffield United's Kevin McDonald picked up a hamstring injury in their 1–0 win in the semi-final second leg, and missed the final. Richard Cresswell had recovered from an eye infection that caused him to miss the previous match, and was available for the final. The referee for the match was Roger East who was assisted by Harry Lennard and Matthew Wilkes. Danny McDermid acted as the fourth official while Mark Scholes was the reserve assistant referee. The match was broadcast live in the United Kingdom on Sky Sports. Huddersfield Town adopted a 4–4–2 formation while Sheffield United played as a 4–4–1–1.

=== Summary ===
==== Regular time ====
Sheffield United kicked off the match around 3 p.m. on 26 May 2012 at Wembley Stadium in front of a crowd of 52,100. In the 9th minute, Huddersfield's Hunt made a run down the right wing and crossed but Higginbotham's volley went wide of Sheffield United's goal. Two minutes later, a long pass deep into Huddersfield territory was mis-headed by Peter Clarke and allowed Cresswell to shoot but his attempt was blocked. On 17 minutes, Stephen Quinn headed a cross from Lowton but Huddersfield's goalkeeper Smithies punched it clear. Rhodes saw his header gathered by the Sheffield United goalkeeper Steve Simonsen in the 32nd minute. Three minutes later Smithies came out to clear a cross from Quinn but missed the ball which was cleared, before Matt Hill's goal-bound strike from the edge of the penalty area was blocked by Clarke. With six minutes of the half remaining, Hunt cut inside from the right wing and shot from 20 yards (18 m) but his strike was wide of the goal. In injury time of the first half, Huddersfield made a quick break following a Sheffield United corner, but Rhodes ran the ball off the pitch and the half ended 0–0.

Neither side made any changes to their personnel during the interval. Two minutes into the second half, a poor clearance from Sheffield United found Danny Ward whose shot from the edge of the penalty area struck the top of the crossbar. In the 54th minute, Lowton won a corner for Sheffield United which Harry Maguire headed wide of the Huddersfield goal. Clarke then headed a Huddersfield corner wide before Higginbotham was shown the first yellow card of the match in the 62nd minute for a late tackle on Lowton. Seven minutes later, Rhodes passed to Higginbotham whose first-time volley missed the target. In the 79th minute, Huddersfield made their first substitution of the match with Gary Roberts coming on to replace Higginbotham. With seven minutes remaining, Huddersfield won a corner after Maguire cleared the ball behind, from which Tommy Miller's header was pushed out by Simonsen before Clarke's follow-up shot was cleared off the Sheffield United goal-line by Michael Doyle. Rhodes then headed a cross from Calum Woods wide of the goal before Sheffield United made their first change of the game with Porter coming on for Cresswell in the 85th minute. Porter's first contribution was to head the ball wide of the Huddersfield post. In the last minute of the match Roberts appeared to have been brought down in the Sheffield United penalty area by Ryan Flynn but no foul was awarded. The match ended 0–0 and went into extra time.

==== Extra time and penalty shootout ====
Huddersfield kicked off the first period of extra time and the first chance came in the fourth minute when Porter headed Quinn's cross goal-bound but it was blocked by Woods. In the 8th minute, Sean Morrison blocked Quinn's volley to keep the match goalless, and a minute later Alan Lee came on for Ward in Huddersfield's second substitution. In stoppage time in the first half of extra time, a run from Quinn ended with his low shot being pushed away by Smithies, before Maguire was booked. The half ended with the score still at 0–0. Three minutes in the second period of extra time, Sheffield Untied's Michael O'Halloran replaced Flynn before Lee's strike from 6 yards (5.5 m) was saved by Simonsen. In the 112th minute, Nick Montgomery cleared Clarke's header off the Sheffield United goal-line. Soon after, Damien Johnson was booked for a foul on Quinn the edge of the Huddersfield penalty area but the resulting free kick from Lee Williamson was easily gathered by Smithies. With four minutes remaining, Scott Arfield came on to replace Novak and just before the final whistle, Andy Taylor was brought on for Montgomery, as the game went to a penalty shootout.

The penalties were taken in front of the Huddersfield Town fans, with their side starting the shootout. Miller's strike was easily saved by Simonsen before Smithies pushed Williamson's spot kick away. Johnson's strike was wide of the goal before Collins opened the scoring after sending Smithies the wrong way. Lee then had his penalty saved by Simonsen before Lowton's strike was easily caught by Smithies. Clarke scored before Taylor's shot hit the post, making it 1–1 after four penalties each side. The next twelve spot kicks were scored and with the score at 7–7 after 20 penalties, only the goalkeepers remained. Smithies strike went in before Simonsen's shot was high over the crossbar. The final score was 8–7 to Huddersfield who were promoted to the Championship.

=== Details ===
26 May 2012
15:00 BST

Huddersfield Town	0–0 (a.e.t.)	Sheffield United
	Report
Penalties
Miller (penalty missed); Johnson (penalty missed); Lee (penalty missed); Clarke (penalty scored); Arfield (penalty scored); Rhodes (penalty scored); Roberts (penalty scored); Woods (penalty scored); Hunt (penalty scored); Morrison (penalty scored); Smithies (penalty scored)	8–7	(penalty missed) Williamson; (penalty scored) Collins; (penalty missed) Lowton; (penalty missed) Taylor; (penalty scored) Porter; (penalty scored) Quinn; (penalty scored) Maguire; (penalty scored) Doyle; (penalty scored) O'Halloran; (penalty scored) Hill; (penalty missed) Simonsen

Wembley Stadium, London
Attendance: 52,100
Referee: Roger East

Huddersfield Town	Sheffield United

GK	1	(England) Alex Smithies
DF	32	(England) Jack Hunt
DF	15	(England) Sean Morrison
DF	5	(England) Peter Clarke (c)
DF	2	(England) Calum Woods
MF	27	(England) Kallum Higginbotham	(yellow card) 62'	(substituted off) 79'
MF	14	(Northern Ireland) Damien Johnson	(yellow card) 113'
MF	18	(England) Tommy Miller
MF	11	(England) Danny Ward		(substituted off) 98'
FW	17	(England) Jordan Rhodes
FW	21	(England) Lee Novak		(substituted off) 116'
Substitutes:
GK	25	(Republic of Ireland) Nick Colgan
DF	12	(England) Tom Clarke
MF	7	(England) Gary Roberts		(substituted on) 79'
MF	16	(Scotland) Scott Arfield		(substituted on) 116'
FW	19	(Republic of Ireland) Alan Lee		(substituted on) 98'
Manager:
(England) Simon Grayson

GK	1	(England) Steve Simonsen
DF	2	(England) Matthew Lowton
DF	15	(Scotland) Neill Collins
DF	19	(England) Harry Maguire	(yellow card) 105+1'
DF	32	(England) Matt Hill
MF	4	(England) Nick Montgomery		(substituted off) 120'
MF	8	(Republic of Ireland) Michael Doyle (c)
MF	11	(Scotland) Ryan Flynn		(substituted off) 108'
MF	14	(England) Lee Williamson
MF	28	(Republic of Ireland) Stephen Quinn
FW	17	(England) Richard Cresswell		(substituted off) 85'
Substitutes:
GK	13	(England) Mark Howard
DF	16	(England) Andy Taylor		(substituted on) 120'
MF	20	(Republic of Ireland) David McAllister
FW	21	(England) Chris Porter		(substituted on) 85'
FW	29	(Scotland) Michael O'Halloran		(substituted on) 108'
Manager:
(England) Danny Wilson

Man of the Match:
Peter Clarke (Huddersfield Town)

Assistant referees:
Harry Lennard
Matthew Wilkes
Fourth official:
Danny McDermid
Reserve Assistant Referee:
Mark Scholes

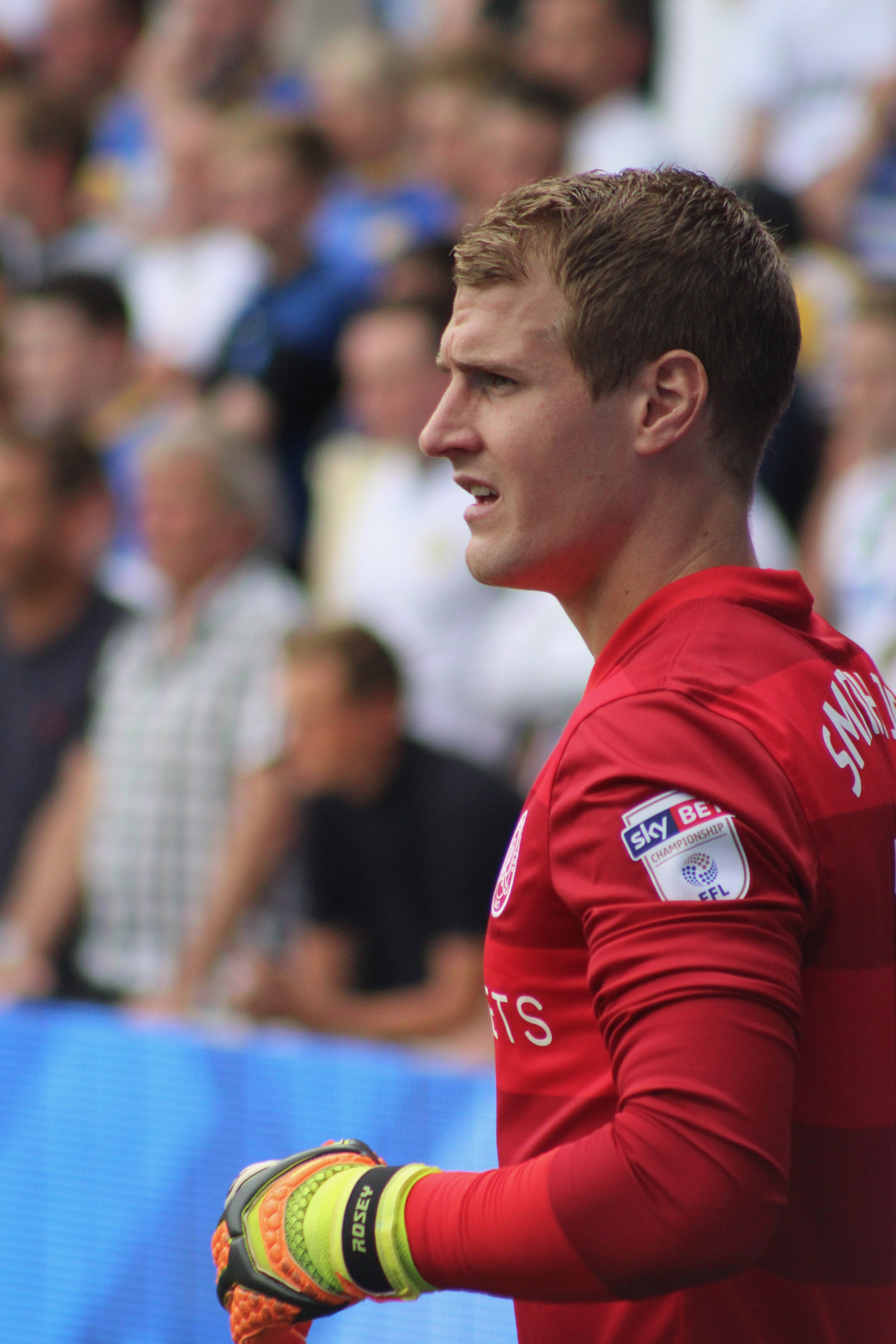
Alex Smithies, the Huddersfield Town goalkeeper, scored the 21st penalty of the shootout.

Statistics
	Huddersfield Town	Sheffield United
Total shots	18	18
Shots on target	5	7
Ball possession	50%	50%
Corner kicks	8	9
Fouls committed	19	15
Offsides	1	3
Yellow cards	2	1
Red cards	0	0

== Post-match ==
Grayson, the winning manager, conceded that there was little between the sides during the final: "There was nothing in the game whatsoever ... What an unbelievable end to the game and I really feel for Sheffield United. Hopefully they can come up next year ... The best way to get promoted is by winning at Wembley" His counterpart Wilson refused to blame Simonsen for the defeat after his penalty miss: "To save the penalties like Steve did, who would have thought it would come down to that? He nearly got his hand to two others but that's the way it goes sometimes. I don't know if that's fate but for him to miss the penalty, it's blameless". Montgomery revealed that Simonsen "was devastated" but that "there's no blame attached to him ... it's a heartbreaking way to end it, but we've just got to try and come back stronger next season".

Sheffield United ended their next season in fifth position in League One and participated in the play-offs where the lost to Yeovil Town in the semi-final. Huddersfield Town's following season saw their manager Grayson sacked in January 2013 after a 12-game winless streak. Mark Robins was appointed as his replacement the following month and he led Huddersfield to a 19th-place finish in the Championship, three positions and four points above the relegation zone.
