= George Long (footballer) =

English footballer

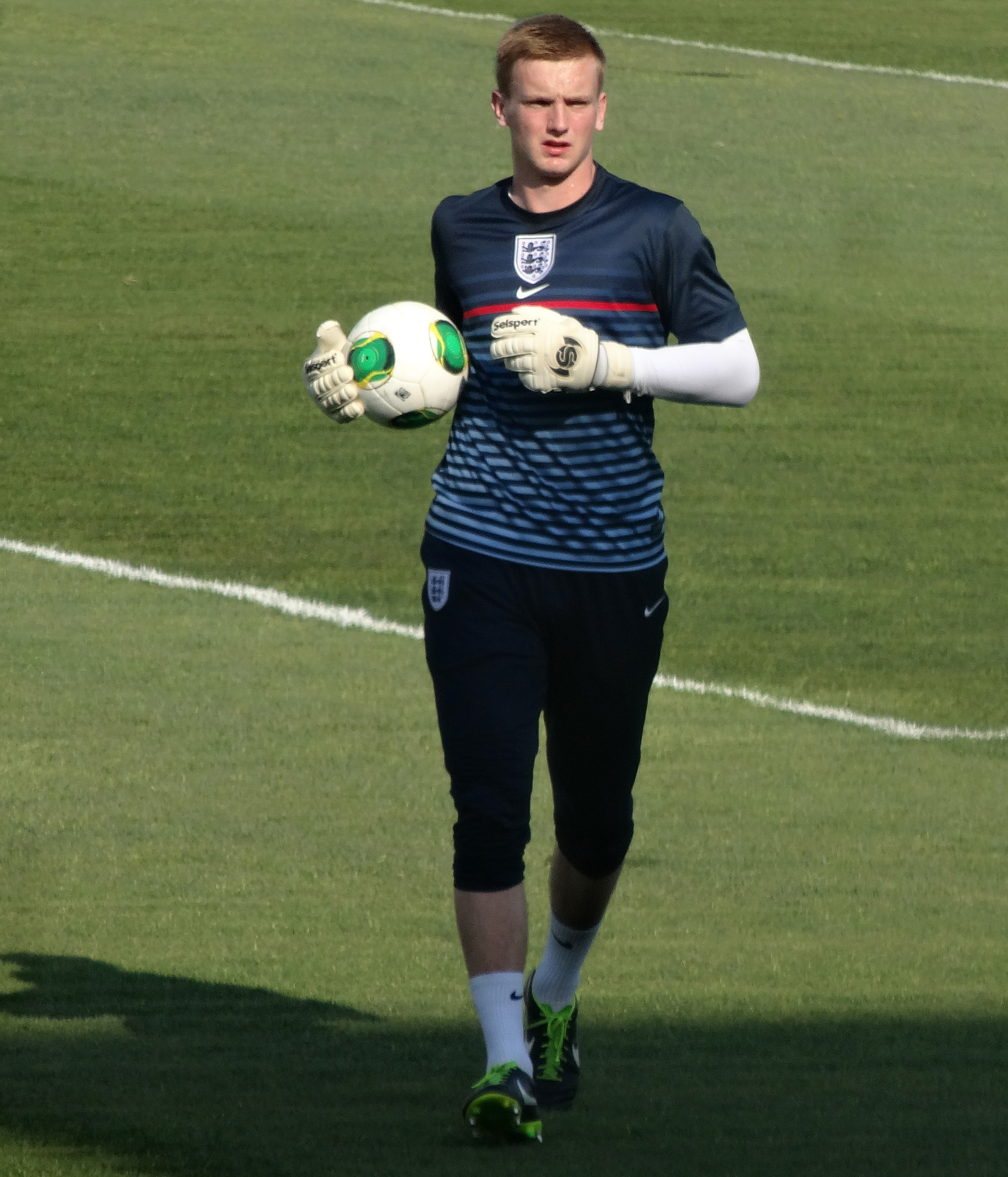
- Long training with the England U20 in 2013

Personal information
- Full name: George Martin Long
- Date of birth: 5 November 1993 (age 32)
- Place of birth: Sheffield, England
- Height: 6 ft 4 in (1.93 m)
- Position: Goalkeeper

Team information
- Current team: Southampton
- Number: 25

Youth career
- 2002–2011: Sheffield United

Senior career*
Years	Team	Apps	(Gls)
2011–2018	Sheffield United	100	(0)
2014	→ Oxford United (loan)	10	(0)
2015	→ Motherwell (loan)	13	(0)
2017–2018	→ AFC Wimbledon (loan)	45	(0)
2018–2021	Hull City	57	(0)
2021–2023	Millwall	36	(0)
2023–2026	Norwich City	16	(0)
2025–2026	→ Southampton (loan)	0	(0)
2026–	Southampton	0	(0)

International career
2011	England U18	1	(0)
2013	England U20	1	(0)
- * Club domestic league appearances and goals as of 10:39, 19 April 2025 (UTC)

George Martin Long (born 5 November 1993) is an English professional footballer who plays as a goalkeeper for EFL Championship club Southampton.

Born in Sheffield, South Yorkshire, he came through the youth ranks at his hometown Sheffield United before making the break into the first team, and has also represented England at Under 18 level. Long has previously had loan spells at Oxford United, Motherwell and AFC Wimbledon. Since leaving Sheffield United, Long has also played for Hull City, Millwall, Norwich City and Southampton.

== Club career ==
=== Sheffield United ===
Long made his debut for the Blades at the beginning of May 2011, starting the last game of the 2010–11 season against Swansea City at the Liberty Stadium, in doing so becoming the youngest goalkeeper to play in a league game for the Blades in the club's history at just 17 years 183 days. Long was a member of the team that reached the final of the FA Youth Cup in 2011, only to lose to Manchester United. After a couple more first-team appearances he was handed a new long-term deal in February 2012 to keep him at Bramall Lane until the summer of 2016.

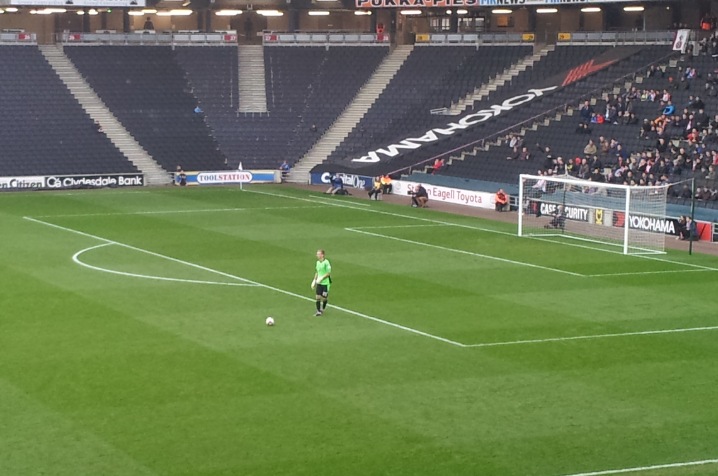
Long playing for Sheffield United in November 2012 at Stadium MK

Long started the following season as second choice behind Mark Howard but, after an injury to Howard in October 2012, became the side's regular stopper. During his initial run in the team he conceded only one goal in five league appearances and was subsequently awarded League One 'Player of the Month' for October, followed by the Blades supporters' Player of the Month for November 2012. Long retained his place in the first team, despite the signing of experienced former Welsh international keeper Danny Coyne, and in March 2013 he was named Football League Young Player of the Month for February, following six consecutive clean sheets over the period. Long remained United's first-choice keeper and finished the season having played 44 times in all competitions.

On 25 July 2014, Long joined Oxford United on a six-month loan deal to play first-team football having dropped to second-choice keeper at Bramall Lane behind Mark Howard. In November, Blades manager Nigel Clough recalled Long from his loan spell after Oxford manager Michael Appleton revealed that Long was no longer part of his plans and had been dropped from the first team to make way for further loan signings.

On 2 February 2015, Long signed for Scottish Premiership club Motherwell on loan until the end of the 2014–15 season. Long helped Motherwell preserve their top flight status with a 6–1 aggregate win over Rangers in the Scottish Premiership play-off final.

After returning to Sheffield United, Long started the 2015–16 season as first choice keeper after impressing new manager Nigel Adkins. However, after a disappointing loss to Gillingham in the first match of the season, Long was replaced by Mark Howard. Long was still used in cup matches and performed well saving two out of five penalties in a shoot out against Hartlepool United in the Football League Trophy. Long returned to first choice in November 2015 against Southend United. Some good performances led to him twice being named in the Sky Bet Football League Team of the week in December 2015. On 6 February 2016, the goalkeeper made his 100th starting appearance for Sheffield United in a League One game against Wigan Athletic. United lost 2–0, though he did save a penalty in the game. On 9 June 2016, Long signed a two-year contract (with a club option for a third year) under new manager Chris Wilder.

On 4 July 2017, he joined AFC Wimbledon on a one-season loan. He was transfer-listed by Sheffield United at the end of the 2017–18 season after the club had triggered his contract option year for the season 2018–19.

=== Hull City ===
On 18 July 2018, Long joined fellow EFL Championship club Hull City on a three-year contract. He made his Hull debut on 28 August 2018 in the Second round of the EFL Cup at home to Derby County which Hull lost 4–0.

=== Millwall ===
On 25 May 2021, it was announced that Long had opted not to sign a new contract with Hull City and instead signed for Millwall on a free transfer.

=== Norwich City ===
In August 2023, Long joined Norwich City on a free transfer. On 4 October 2024, he signed a new three-year contract with the club.

=== Southampton ===
On 25 August 2025, Long joined Southampton on a season-long loan. He made his debut for the club on 14 February 2026 in a 2–1 victory against Leicester City in the FA Cup.

On 8 June 2026, Long joined Southampton permanently on a two-year contract which started from 15 June 2026.

== International career ==
Long made his England U18 debut in April 2011, coming on as a second-half substitute during a 1–1 draw with Italy in Carpi. Following a successful 2012–13 season, Long was selected in the provisional 35-man squad for the 2013 FIFA Under 20 World Cup, and was later confirmed as part of the 21-man squad for the finals themselves. Long featured in a pre-tournament practice match against Uruguay, but failed to make any competitive appearances during the tournament. On 8 August 2013, Long got his first call up to the England U21 team for the match against Scotland U21s on 13 August at Sheffield United's Bramall Lane. Upon his first call up to the U21s Long stated "It makes it a bit more special that it's at Bramall Lane. There will be a great atmosphere there and a packed stadium, so I'm looking forward to it." On 27 August 2013, Long was called up for the England U21s again under new boss Gareth Southgate for matches against Moldova U21s and Finland U21s for Group 1 2015 U-21 Euro Qualifier matches and once more in November for matches against San Marino U21s and Finland's U21s again.

== Career statistics ==
As of match played 14 February 2026

Appearances and goals by club, season and competition
Club	Season	League			National cup (Note: Includes FA Cup)		League cup (Note: Includes EFL Cup)		Other		Total	
Club	Season	Division	Apps	Goals	Apps	Goals	Apps	Goals	Apps	Goals	Apps	Goals
Sheffield United	2010–11	Championship	1	0	0	0	0	0	0	0	1	0
Sheffield United	2011–12	League One	2	0	0	0	0	0	2 (Note: Appearances in the Football League Trophy)	0	4	0
Sheffield United	2012–13	League One	36	0	4	0	0	0	4 (Note: Two appearances in the Football League Trophy and two in the League One play-offs)	0	44	0
Sheffield United	2013–14	League One	27	0	4	0	0	0	0	0	31	0
Sheffield United	2014–15	League One	0	0	0	0	0	0	—		0	0
Sheffield United	2015–16	League One	31	0	3	0	1	0	3	0	38	0
Sheffield United	2016–17	League One	3	0	0	0	1	0	1	0	5	0
Sheffield United	Total		100	0	11	0	2	0	10	0	123	0
Oxford United (loan)	2014–15	League Two	10	0	0	0	0	0	1	0	11	0
Motherwell (loan)	2014–15	Scottish Premiership	13	0	—		—		2 (Note: Appearances in the Scottish Premiership relegation play-offs)	0	15	0
AFC Wimbledon (loan)	2017–18	League One	45	0	3	0	1	0	0	0	49	0
Hull City	2018–19	Championship	4	0	1	0	1	0	—		6	0
Hull City	2019–20	Championship	45	0	1	0	0	0	—		46	0
Hull City	2020–21	League One	8	0	2	0	1	0	2	0	13	0
Hull City	Total		57	0	4	0	2	0	2	0	65	0
Millwall	2021–22	Championship	0	0	1	0	3	0	—		4	0
Millwall	2022–23	Championship	36	0	0	0	1	0	—		37	0
Millwall	Total		36	0	1	0	4	0	—		41	0
Norwich City	2023–24	Championship	7	0	3	0	2	0	—		12	0
Norwich City	2024–25	Championship	9	0	1	0	2	0	—		12	0
Norwich City	2025–26	Championship	0	0	0	0	0	0	—		0	0
Norwich City	Total		16	0	4	0	4	0	—		24	0
Southampton (loan)	2025–26	Championship	0	0	1	0	0	0	0	0	1	0
Southampton	2026–27	Championship	0	0	0	0	0	0	—		0	0
Career total			277	0	24	0	13	0	15	0	329	0

== Honours ==
Hull City

- EFL League One: 2020–21

Individual

- Football League One Player of the Month: October 2012
- Football League Young Player of the Month: February 2013
