= Darryl Westlake =

English footballer

Personal information
- Full name: Darryl James Westlake
- Date of birth: 1 March 1991 (age 35)
- Place of birth: Sutton Coldfield, England
- Height: 5 ft 11 in (1.80 m)
- Position: Defender

Youth career
- Walsall

Senior career*
Years	Team	Apps	(Gls)
2009–2012	Walsall	67	(1)
2012–2014	Sheffield United	18	(0)
2013–2014	→ Mansfield Town (loan)	23	(0)
2014–2016	Kilmarnock	25	(1)
2016–2019	Stourbridge		
- * Club domestic league appearances and goals as of 00:00, 27 February 2020 (UTC)

Darryl James Westlake (born 1 March 1991) is a footballer who most recently played as a defender for Stourbridge. Born in Sutton Coldfield, England, he began his career with Walsall where he spent three seasons before moving to Sheffield United, and also spent time on loan at Mansfield Town in 2014. Westlake signed for Kilmarnock in September 2014 for two seasons.

== Club career ==
=== Walsall ===
Born in Sutton Coldfield, England, Westlake started his youth career at Walsall and signed his first professional contract with the club, having been training in the first team. Westlake made his Walsall début on 15 August 2009 in the Football League One clash with Southend United at the Bescot Stadium, which ended in a 2–2 draw. He was seen as a future prospect due to his consistent performances at such a young age, finishing the season with the Young Player of the Year Award and a new two-year contract in May 2010.

Westlake started the 2010–11 season when he played his first game, in a 1–0 loss against Colchester United on 4 September 2010. Having made four appearances for the club this season, Westlake was linked with a loan move to League Two side Lincoln City, but the club refused to loan him out. As a result, Westlake forced his way back in the first team and continued to retain his first place for the rest of the season. Westlake scored his first Walsall goal (and his first professional goal), in a 1–1 draw against Oldham Athletic on 25 January 2011. Westlake later credited Manager Dean Smith for giving him confidence to fight for first team football and went on make 28 appearances for the club.

2011–12 Westlake played seventeen games and at the end of the season was offered a new contract with a one-year deal.

=== Sheffield United ===
On 20 July 2012, Westlake joined Sheffield United in July 2012, signing a two-year contract, with an option for a third year. Following his move to Sheffield United, the club have to pay Walsall an undisclosed compensation package because in England, when a player under the age of 23 leaves a club at the end of his contract, his new club must pay a fee to his old club as compensation for having trained him up and Westlake was under 23 when he left Walsall. Westlake made his debut for the Blades in September 2012, playing in central midfield in a 1–1 home draw against Bury.

On 28 November 2013 Westlake joined Mansfield Town on loan until 5 January 2014, a deal that was later extended until the end of the season. Westlake played regularly for the Stags and returned to Bramall Lane the following summer having played 25 games. Westlake was released by Sheffield United on 16 May 2014.

=== Kilmarnock ===
On 9 September 2014, Westlake signed for Scottish Premiership club Kilmarnock on a one-year contract with the option of an extra year.

Westlake made his league debut for the club, playing as a left back position, in a 3–0 win over Partick Thistle on 27 September 2014. However, Westlake was soon injured in the 43rd minute, resulting being in the stretcher, in a 1–0 loss against Aberdeen on 20 December 2014. Westlake made his return to the team, in a 2–2 draw against Partick Thistle on 24 January 2015. Westlake then scored his first Kilmarnock goal on 15 April 2015, in a 4–1 loss to Celtic.

2015-2016 Westlake took up the option of the second year and helped with an assist against Celtic on 12 August 2015 He played eight games for Kilmarnock at the beginning of the season. Having an ankle injury over the winter period Westlake returned to training and played several games for the under-20 team which then saw him back in the squad on 19 March 2016 against Celtic. Westlake's contract with Kilmarnock ended on 8 April 2016 by mutual consent.

== Career statistics ==
As of 29 June 2016

Club	Season	League	League		FA Cup		League Cup		Other^{[A]}		Total	
Club	Season	League	Apps	Goals	Apps	Goals	Apps	Goals	Apps	Goals	Apps	Goals
Walsall	2009–10	League One	22	0	1	0	0	0	1	0	24	0
Walsall	2010–11	League One	28	1	3	0	1	0	1	0	33	1
Walsall	2011–12	League One	17	0	1	0	1	0	2	0	21	0
Walsall	Total		67	1	5	0	2	0	4	0	78	1
Sheffield United	2012–13	League One	11	0	2	0	0	0	4	0	17	0
Sheffield United	2013–14	League One	7	0	0	0	1	0	2	0	10	0
Sheffield United	Total		18	0	2	0	1	0	6	0	27	0
Mansfield Town (loan)	2013–14	League Two	23	0	2	0	0	0	0	0	25	0
Kilmarnock	2014–15	Scottish Premiership	17	1	0	0	1	0	0	0	17	1
Kilmarnock	2015–16	Scottish Premiership	8	0	0	0	0	0	0	0	8	0
Kilmarnock	Total		25	1	0	0	1	0	0	0	26	1
Career total			133	2	9	0	4	0	10	0	156	2

A. The "Other" column constitutes appearances and goals (including those as a substitute) in the Football League Trophy and the Football League play-offs.
