= Roger East (referee) =

English football referee

- Born: 12 May 1965 (age 61)

Domestic
Years	League	Role
2006–2013	Football League	Referee
2012–2019	Premier League	Referee

Roger East (born 12 May 1965) is an English former professional football referee who officiated primarily in the Premier League. He was associated with the Wiltshire Football Association.

== Career ==
East has been on the national list of football referees since 2006. In 2006, at the request of the Football Association, he travelled to Libya to officiate the Tripoli derby between Al-Ittihad and Al-Ahly. He had previously been an assistant referee for the 2004 FA Cup Final and the 2006 FA Community Shield.

He took charge of the 2012 Football League One play-off final between Sheffield United and Huddersfield Town and refereed his first Premier League game in September 2012 in a match between Swansea City and Sunderland. He also was in charge of the championship play - off clash with Norwich City and Ipswich Town in 2015.

East became a member of the Select Group of Premier League referees for the 2013–14 season. East retired at the end of the 2018–19 season.
