= John Cofie =

English footballer

Personal information
- Full name: John Erzuah Cofie
- Date of birth: 21 January 1993 (age 33)
- Place of birth: Aboso, Ghana
- Height: 6 ft 0 in (1.83 m)
- Position: Forward

Youth career
- 2007: Burnley
- 2007–2010: Manchester United

Senior career*
Years	Team	Apps	(Gls)
2010–2013	Manchester United	0	(0)
2012	→ Royal Antwerp (loan)	13	(3)
2012–2013	→ Sheffield United (loan)	16	(2)
2013	→ Notts County (loan)	7	(1)
2013–2014	Barnsley	0	(0)
2014–2015	Molde	0	(0)
2015	Crawley Town	1	(0)
2015–2016	Wrexham	2	(0)
2016	AFC Telford United	17	(4)
2016–2017	Southport	8	(0)
2016	→ Bradford Park Avenue (loan)	2	(1)
2016–2017	→ Chorley (loan)	2	(0)
2017	Stalybridge Celtic	8	(1)
2017–2018	Derry City	4	(0)
2018	Hume City	9	(2)
2020	Global		

International career
2010	England U17	3	(0)
- * Club domestic league appearances and goals

John Erzuah Cofie (born 21 January 1993) is a retired footballer who played as a forward.

He began his career with Burnley and moved to Manchester United for a fee of £1m at the age of 14, but failed to make the break into the first-team. Following loan spells with Royal Antwerp, Sheffield United and Notts County he was released by Manchester United, joining Barnsley on a free transfer in July 2013. He never made a first-team appearance at Barnsley before joining Norwegian club Molde in August 2014. In March 2015, he returned to England, joining Crawley Town. He moved to Wrexham in November 2015. In January 2016, Cofie joined AFC Telford United before moving to Southport in June 2016.

Born in Aboso, Ghana, Cofie moved to England at a young age and has been capped by England at under-17 level.

== Club career ==
=== Manchester United ===
Cofie began his football career as a junior player with Burnley. After Burnley rejected a £250,000 bid from Liverpool for Cofie in November 2007, he refused to return to training with the club. After further interest from Chelsea, Cofie was signed by Manchester United in November 2007 and joined their Academy in July 2009. After signing professional terms with United in 2010, he continued to play for the youth side and looked to break through into the reserve side.

In 2012, he was loaned to Belgian side Royal Antwerp to gain first-team experience. The following summer, Cofie signed a one–year loan deal with League One side Sheffield United for the 2012–13 season. After making his debut in the opening game of the season against Shrewsbury Town, Cofie scored his first goal for the club a week later at Colchester United. On 3 January 2013, it was revealed that Cofie had returned to Manchester United, despite having expressed a desire to see out the season with the Blades.

In February 2013, Cofie joined another League One side, Notts County, on a one-month long loan deal. Cofie scored on his debut, in a 1–1 draw with Crewe Alexandra, but his deal was not extended and he returned to United in March having made seven appearances for County. After failing to break through into their first team, Cofie was released by Manchester United at the end of the 2012–13 season.

=== Barnsley ===
Available on a free transfer, Cofie signed a one-year deal with Championship side Barnsley on 19 July 2013. Cofie was released by Barnsley at the end of the 2013–14 season.

=== Molde ===
On 9 August 2014, Cofie signed a contract with Tippeligaen side Molde FK.

He was released in January 2015 after not making a single first team appearance for the club.

=== Crawley Town ===
Cofie signed for Crawley Town on a one-month contract on 25 March 2015.

=== Wrexham ===
Cofie signed for Wrexham on non-contract terms on 25 November 2015.

=== AFC Telford United ===
Cofie moved to AFC Telford United in the National League North in January 2016.

=== Southport ===
In June 2016, Cofie joined National League club Southport on a free transfer. He joined National League North side Bradford Park Avenue on loan on 19 November 2016. On 29 December 2016, he was loaned out once again, this time to National League North club Chorley on a one-month deal.

=== Stalybridge Celtic ===
In September 2017, he joined Stalybridge Celtic.

=== Derry City ===
Cofie joined Derry City on 28 November 2017.

=== Hume City ===
Cofie played for Australian club Hume City of the second-tier league, National Premier Leagues in 2018.

=== Global F.C. ===
Cofie was without a club until January 2020, when he was signed in by Philippines Football League side, Global. In July 2020, 27-year-old Cofie announced his retirement to start a coaching career.

== Personal life ==
In January 2023, Cofie appeared in court charged with rape. In February 2024, he was found not guilty on all counts by a jury.

== Career statistics ==
As of match played 2 September 2018

Appearances and goals by club, season and competition
Club	Season	League			National Cup		League Cup		Other		Total	
Club	Season	Division	Apps	Goals	Apps	Goals	Apps	Goals	Apps	Goals	Apps	Goals
Manchester United	2011–12	Premier League	0	0	0	0	0	0	0	0	0	0
Manchester United	2012–13	Premier League	0	0	0	0	0	0	0	0	0	0
Manchester United	Total		0	0	0	0	0	0	0	0	0	0
Royal Antwerp (loan)	2011–12	Belgian Second Division	13	3	0	0	—		—		13	3
Sheffield United (loan)	2012–13	League One	16	2	1	0	0	0	1 (Note: Appearance(s) in Football League Trophy)	0	18	2
Notts County (loan)	2012–13	League One	7	1	—		—		—		7	1
Barnsley	2013–14	Championship	0	0	0	0	0	0	—		0	0
Molde	2014	Tippeligaen	0	0	0	0	—		—		0	0
Crawley Town	2014–15	League One	1	0	0	0	0	0	0	0	1	0
Wrexham	2015–16	National League	2	0	0	0	—		1 (Note: Appearance(s) in FA Trophy)	0	3	0
AFC Telford United	2015–16	National League North	17	4	—		—		—		17	4
Southport	2016–17	National League	8	0	2	0	—		1 (Note: Appearance(s) in Lancashire Senior Cup)	0	11	0
Bradford Park Avenue (loan)	2016–17	National League North	2	1	—		—		0	0	2	1
Chorley (loan)	2016–17	National League North	2	0	—		—		—		2	0
Stalybridge Celtic	2017–18	Northern Premier League Premier Division	8	1	1	0	—		2	1	11	2
Derry City	2018	League of Ireland Premier Division	4	0	—		1	0	—		5	0
Hume City	2018	National Premier Leagues Victoria	9	2	0	0	—		—		9	2
Career total			89	14	4	0	1	0	5	1	99	15
