= Danny Coyne =

Welsh footballer

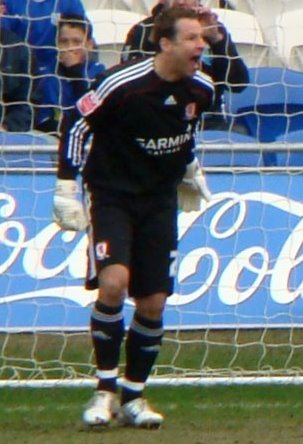
- Coyne playing for Middlesbrough in 2010

Personal information
- Full name: Daniel Coyne
- Date of birth: 27 August 1973 (age 53)
- Place of birth: Prestatyn, Wales
- Height: 6 ft 0 in (1.83 m)
- Position: Goalkeeper

Youth career
- Tranmere Rovers

Senior career*
Years	Team	Apps	(Gls)
1992–1999	Tranmere Rovers	111	(0)
1999–2003	Grimsby Town	181	(0)
2003–2004	Leicester City	4	(0)
2004–2007	Burnley	40	(0)
2007–2009	Tranmere Rovers	80	(0)
2009–2012	Middlesbrough	26	(0)
2012–2013	Sheffield United	0	(0)
2013–2019	Shrewsbury Town	0	(0)
Total		442	(0)

International career
1993–1995	Wales U21	9	(0)
1999	Wales B	1	(0)
1996–2007	Wales	16	(0)

Managerial career
- 2016: Shrewsbury Town (caretaker)
- 2018: Shrewsbury Town (caretaker)
- * Club domestic league appearances and goals

Daniel Coyne (born 27 August 1973) is a Welsh football coach and former professional player.

As a player, he was a goalkeeper who played between 1992 and 2018. He came through the youth ranks at Tranmere Rovers during the 1992–93 season. Coyne eventually went on to become the club's first choice keeper and went on to make 111 appearances in the league before signing for Grimsby Town in the summer of 1999. He spent four seasons at Blundell Park, two of which saw him named "Supporters' Player of the Season" and thus becoming an integral part of every Grimsby team he played in. In his final year at Town the club suffered relegation from the Football League First Division. In July 2003 Coyne signed with Premier League side Leicester City where he was understudy to Ian Walker for one season before moving to Burnley. Initially signed as the first club's new first choice keeper he eventually was replaced by Brian Jensen, and only made 40 league appearances in a three-year stay at Turf Moor. In 2007, he returned to Tranmere Rovers for two years where he made a further 80 league appearances before joining Middlesbrough in 2009 who had recently suffered relegation from the Premier League. Coyne went on to make 26 league appearances in a three-year stay at Boro where he was mainly used as reserve keeper. During the 2012–13 campaign he joined Sheffield United but failed to make an appearance and departed at the end of the season.

Between 1996 and 2007 Coyne picked up 16 international caps for Wales.

== Club career ==
=== Tranmere Rovers ===
Born in Prestatyn, Flintshire, Coyne began his career at Tranmere Rovers where he made over a hundred starting appearances for the Prenton Park club between 1992 and his 1999 departure. In 1996, he went on to win his first senior cap for Wales.

=== Grimsby Town ===
In 1999, he left for Grimsby Town managed by Alan Buckley where he was a replacement for Town's number 1 Aidan Davison who had transferred to Sheffield United. Coyne soon became a fans' favourite for the club where he would remain for four seasons. During his time at Blundell Park he was a regular in the first team whilst having rookie Steve Croudson as his understudy for the entire four-year stay. During the 2001–2002 season Coyne was part of the Grimsby team that beat Premier League side Liverpool 2–1 at Anfield in the third round of the English League Cup. In both the 00–01 and 01–02 seasons Coyne's performances would go on to see him be crowned the Supporters' Player of The Season; as well as this, he became a regular fixture in the Welsh international side. In the 2002–2003 season at Grimsby he was part of a Welsh International trio of himself, John Oster and Darren Barnard who were on the books at Town. It was during that season that Grimsby would find themselves being relegated from the First Division after a five-year stay, and this would see the end of Coyne's Grimsby career.

=== Leicester City ===
During the summer of 2003, Coyne signed for Premier League club Leicester City as the club's second choice keeper. He struggled at Leicester, usually playing second fiddle to Ian Walker who himself was an English international goalkeeper.

=== Burnley ===
He signed for Burnley in July 2004 on a three-year contract from Leicester. He had previously struggled to hold down a starting place for Wales, winning 11 caps in 10 years but at Burnley he had managed to finally secure his first team place after several fine performances in the 2004–05 season. After recovering from an injury sustained at Queens Park Rangers in that season, he went into the 2005–06 season as first choice for Wales' FIFA World Cup qualifiers. He then suffered a knee injury in the game against Brighton & Hove Albion on 24 September 2005 and did not play again that season. Coyne was not yet deemed fully fit by Burnley manager Steve Cotterill at the start of the 2005–06 season, although he was selected at the start of the season for the Welsh squad before he had played again for Burnley. Once again, an injury and the good form of Brian Jensen saw him relegated to substitute and Coyne talked openly of the possibility of leaving Burnley at the end of his contract at the close of the 2006–07 season. This was confirmed on 8 May.

=== Return to Tranmere Rovers ===
Coyne was re-signed by his original club, Tranmere Rovers, on 3 July 2007 on a free transfer. Coyne immediately re-established himself as the club's first choice goalkeeper, missing just five league games in his first season back at Prenton Park. Described by his manager Ronnie Moore as "The best goal keeper in League One" Coyne played nearly every game during his time at Tranmere. He helped Tranmere push for a play off place. He recorded 20 clean sheets to secure the division's Golden Glove prize.

=== Middlesbrough ===
On 6 July 2009, Coyne joined Middlesbrough on a two-year deal, to challenge Brad Jones as the regular first team goalkeeper. It was soon established that manager Gareth Southgate found Coyne far superior in his goalkeeping experience to Brad who when returning from a short injury layoff was left on the bench.

The 2009–10 season started well for the shot stopper; he was the only keeper in the Championship to keep clean sheets in the first four games of the season. For a short period Coyne was dropped as first choice keeper after a 5–0 thrashing against West Bromwich Albion, only to return after a subsequent poor performance by Middlesbrough first choice keeper Brad Jones. Coyne was mostly Middlesbrough's second choice keeper (first behind Jones, then when he departed, Jason Steele became first Gordon Strachan's first choice goalkeeper, then his successor Tony Mowbray's number one). Even when Steele was out injured, Mowbray brought in Paul Smith and then Carl Ikeme on loan from Nottingham Forest and Wolves respectively. On 3 May 2012, it was reported that Danny Coyne had left Middlesbrough after his contract expired.

=== Sheffield United ===
In October 2012 Coyne started training with Sheffield United as first choice Blades keeper Mark Howard was ruled out for 3 months through injury. On 17 November 2012 Coyne signed a 28-day deal with the Blades as cover for George Long. The contract was extended by a further month on 17 December 2012. He extended his contract once again on 18 February 2013 on a one-month deal keeping him at Bramall Lane until the end of March. After failing to make a first team appearance Coyne was released by the Blades when his contract expired in June 2013.

== Coaching career ==
On 23 July 2013, Coyne was appointed as a player–coach of Shrewsbury Town, following Gavin Ward's decision to accept a similar role with Nottingham Forest. He went on to become the new joint-assistant manager alongside Michael Jackson, following the club's relegation to League Two at the end of the 2013–14 season. On 6 October 2016, after Mellon left the club, Coyne was appointed as caretaker manager until further notice, overseeing four consecutive defeats during his brief tenure, before the appointment of Paul Hurst, whereupon he reverted to his previous coaching role.

In August 2017, at the age of 44, Coyne was called up to the Shrewsbury Town first-team squad for the first time, as goalkeeping cover whilst first-choice Dean Henderson was away on international duty. He featured as an unused substitute in a 2–1 away victory at Gillingham on 2 September. Coyne was re-appointed caretaker manager for a second spell in November 2018, following the departure of John Askey. Following the appointment of Sam Ricketts, Coyne was promoted to the role of first-team coach, with former academy keeper coach Phil Smart taking over Coyne's previous position. On 25 May 2019, Coyne left the club after six years.

On 14 June 2019, Coyne was appointed as the new goalkeeping coach of former playing side Middlesbrough, becoming a member of newly appointed manager Jonathan Woodgate's new coaching staff. Following the appointment of Neil Warnock as manager in August 2020 Coyne was replaced by Ian Bennett.

== International career ==
Coyne was capped 16 times in 11 years by Wales.

== Managerial statistics ==
As of match played 2 December 2018

Managerial record by team and tenure
Team	Nat	From	To	Record								Ref
Team	Nat	From	To	G	W	D	L	GF	GA	GD	Win %	Ref
Shrewsbury Town (caretaker)	(England)	6 October 2016	23 October 2016	4	0	0	4	4	12	−8	0.00	
Shrewsbury Town (caretaker)	(England)	12 November 2018	3 December 2018	6	5	0	1	13	7	+6	83.33	
Total				10	5	0	5	17	19	−2	50.00	—

== Honours ==
=== Grimsby Town ===
- Supporters' Player of the Year: 2001, 2002

=== Personal ===
- Football League One Golden Glove: 2008–09
