= David McAllister (footballer) =

Irish footballer

Personal information
- Full name: David James McAllister
- Date of birth: 29 December 1988 (age 37)
- Place of birth: Drogheda, Ireland
- Position: Midfielder

Team information
- Current team: Shelbourne (assistant coach)

Youth career
- Rush Athletic
- Home Farm
- Bohemians

Senior career*
| Years | Team | Apps | (Gls) |
| 2007–2008 | Drogheda United | 0 | (0) |
| 2008 | → Shelbourne (loan) | 16 | (7) |
| 2009 | Shelbourne | 30 | (16) |
| 2010 | St Patrick's Athletic | 32 | (3) |
| 2011–2013 | Sheffield United | 20 | (2) |
| 2012 | → Shrewsbury Town (loan) | 15 | (0) |
| 2013–2015 | Shrewsbury Town | 41 | (2) |
| 2014–2015 | → Stevenage (loan) | 12 | (0) |
| 2015–2016 | Stevenage | 5 | (0) |
| 2017–2018 | Shamrock Rovers | 39 | (6) |
| Total | | 210 | (36) |
- * Club domestic league appearances and goals

David James McAllister (born 29 December 1988) is an Irish professional football coach and former player who played as a midfielder. He is currently assistant coach of League of Ireland Premier Division club Shelbourne.

Born in Drogheda in the Republic of Ireland, McAllister started his senior career with Drogheda United before spells with Shelbourne and St. Patrick's Athletic. In 2011, he moved to England to play for Sheffield United, where he remained for two years before switching to Shrewsbury Town and then Stevenage. McAllister later returned to Ireland with Shamrock Rovers where he retired.

== Club career ==
=== League of Ireland ===
Growing up in Rush, County Dublin, McAllister began footballing life at underage level with his local side Rush Athletic before progressing up the Dublin schoolboy ranks with Home Farm and Bohemians. McAllister made the step up to senior football with Drogheda United in 2007 as part of their under 21 panel. In 2008 McAllister was promoted to Drogheda United's first team for whom he made one appearance in a League of Ireland Cup tie against Shelbourne on 5 May 2008.

With first team opportunities restricted in an experienced Drogheda squad, McAllister was loaned to Shelbourne in July 2008 to gain first team experience. He made his Shelbourne début on 11 July 2008 as a substitute in a 2–0 home defeat to Limerick 37. McAllister scored seven goals in 16 league appearances for Shelbourne during his loan spell and his impressive displays were rewarded with a permanent move to Shelbourne for the 2009 League of Ireland First Division season. McAllister thrived in Shelbourne's 2009 campaign. He scored an impressive 19 goals in 34 league and cup appearances for Shelbourne as they finished First Division runners-up for a second consecutive season.

With aspirations to play International Under 23 and League of Ireland Premier Division football, McAllister departed Shelbourne following the 2009 season to join Dublin rivals St. Patrick's Athletic for the Saints' 2010 Premier Division campaign. He made 40 league and cup appearances, scoring 5 goals for St. Patrick's Athletic in 2010 and after a number of impressive displays he was attracting interest from further afield.

=== Sheffield United ===
In November 2010, McAllister undertook a trial with Sheffield United which resulted in him signing a pre-contract agreement to move there permanently during the January transfer window. A few days after his move McAllister made his début for the Blades as a 75-minute substitute in an FA Cup tie against Aston Villa at Bramall Lane but had to wait until late April to make his first league appearance, a game against Bristol City in which he scored his first goal for the club. The Blades were struggling however and at the end of the season were relegated from the Championship.

With United now in League One McAllister was on the fringes of the first team squad making a handful of appearances in the first half of the season, predominantly in the various cup competitions during which he scored his only goal of the season against Burton Albion in the Football League Trophy. Making good progress he was rewarded with a contract extension in January 2012 to keep him at Bramall Lane until the summer of 2014.

He's done well for us, he's energetic, puts his foot in...
He can play too, but we can't keep him longer
than the 93 days allowed so he'll have to return to
Sheffield United before the end of the season.

— Graham Turner, Shrewsbury Town Manager

Immediately after signing his extension he was loaned out to League Two side Shrewsbury Town for a month to gain more first team experience, with Shrewsbury manager Graham Turner describing him as "a strong player who can put his foot in and who has a good shot on him". After a successful initial spell McAllister opted to extend his loan deal at the Shrews until the end of March, and with the move working out well it was agreed to extend his loan until 14 April, two weeks prior to the end of the season.

I've watched David in training with us since he
came back here and he's definitely improved...
He got regular football with a very good side
and that's benefited his education...
It's the little things in his game that have come on.
That's what you really notice.

— Danny Wilson, Sheffield United Manager
upon McAlister's return from Shrewsbury

McAllister was a regular starter for the Shrews during his time there, including playing in a home match against Port Vale which was abandoned after 64 minutes due to a fire at Greenhous Meadow, with Shrews 1–0 at the time. McAllister's impressive run was temporarily halted at the end of March when he incurred a red card, being controversially sent off against Aldershot Town. Shrewsbury Town tried to appeal against the red card to the Football Association (FA) using video evidence, but the appeal was rejected. This meant that McAllister's automatic three game ban stood, effectively ending his stay with the Shrews. McAllister returned to Bramall Lane as he wasn't able to play any more games for Shrewsbury that season. On his return to Sheffield, Blades manager Danny Wilson stated that McAllister had returned a "much better player" and sympathised with him over his controversial sending off which ended his loan spell at Shrewsbury.

With the Blades still in League One, the start to the 2012–13 season saw McAllister finally break into the Blades first team. He began to make regular starting appearances and scored the only goal against his previous loan employers Shrewsbury Town in the opening game of the season. Having played regularly until November McAllister lost his place once more and deemed a fringe player, was allowed to leave as United looked to trim their squad. During his time at Bramall Lane, McAllister made a total of 30 appearances and scored 4 goals.

=== Shrewsbury Town ===
In January 2013 McAllister completed a move League One rivals and former loan club Shrewsbury Town for an undisclosed fee, signing a two-and-a-half-year deal. Manager Graham Turner said "It's just over a week ago that Sheffield United accepted a bid for David, so obviously we're pleased to have concluded the deal... Initially it was a surprise that they would sell him as he's figured in a lot of their games, but I think the fact that he has been here and knows all about us, knows the professional attitude and the work ethic here helped in his decision to join us." McAllister scored his first goal in Shrewsbury colours on 2 March 2013 in a 3–1 defeat to Walsall at the Bescot Stadium. McAllister picked up an ankle injury in March 2014, which saw him miss the season run-in as Shrewsbury were relegated to League Two.

McAllister also missed the following pre-season, and was made available for loan by new manager Micky Mellon on regaining full fitness, joining Stevenage on an initial months loan on 16 October 2014. The loan deal was later extended, with McAllister not returning to his parent club until the New Year. He was released by the club, having come to an arrangement regarding the remainder of his contract, on 16 January 2015 and signed permanently with Stevenage four days later on undisclosed terms.

=== Stevenage ===
After an injury hit 18-month spell with Stevenage, McAllister was released in May 2016.

== International career ==
McAllister's performances earned him a call up for the Republic of Ireland U23 national team in 2010, however he wasn't able to play due to an ankle injury.

== Career statistics ==
As of 20 July 2018

| Club | Season | League | League | | Cup | | League Cup | | Other | | Total | |
| Club | Season | League | Apps | Goals | Apps | Goals | Apps | Goals | Apps | Goals | Apps | Goals |
|---|---|---|---|---|---|---|---|---|---|---|---|---|
| Drogheda United | 2008 | LOI Premier Division | 0 | 0 | 0 | 0 | 1 | 0 | 0 | 0 | 1 | 0 |
| Shelbourne (loan) | 2008 | LOI First Division | 16 | 7 | 0 | 0 | 0 | 0 | — | | 16 | 7 |
| Shelbourne | 2009 | LOI First Division | 30 | 16 | 2 | 1 | 1 | 1 | 1 (Note: Appearance(s) in League of Ireland promotion/relegation play-offs) | 1 | 34 | 19 |
| Shelbourne | Total | | 46 | 23 | 2 | 1 | 1 | 1 | 1 | 1 | 50 | 26 |
| St. Patrick's Athletic | 2010 | LOI Premier Division | 32 | 3 | 2 | 1 | 2 | 0 | 4 (Note: Appearance(s) in Setanta Sports Cup) | 1 | 40 | 5 |
| Sheffield United | 2010–11 | Championship | 2 | 1 | 1 | 0 | 0 | 0 | — | | 3 | 1 |
| Sheffield United | 2011–12 | League One | 4 | 0 | 2 | 0 | 2 | 0 | 2 (Note: Appearance(s) in Football League Trophy) | 1 | 10 | 1 |
| Sheffield United | 2012–13 | League One | 14 | 1 | 1 | 0 | 1 | 0 | 1 | 1 | 17 | 2 |
| Sheffield United | Total | | 20 | 2 | 4 | 0 | 3 | 0 | 3 | 2 | 30 | 4 |
| Shrewsbury Town (loan) | 2011–12 | League Two | 15 | 0 | — | | — | | — | | 15 | 0 |
| Shrewsbury Town | 2012–13 | League One | 15 | 1 | — | | — | | — | | 15 | 1 |
| Shrewsbury Town | 2013–14 | League One | 26 | 1 | 1 | 0 | 1 | 0 | 1 | 0 | 29 | 1 |
| Shrewsbury Town | 2014–15 | League Two | 0 | 0 | — | | 0 | 0 | 0 | 0 | 0 | 0 |
| Shrewsbury Town | Total | | 56 | 2 | 1 | 0 | 1 | 0 | 1 | 0 | 59 | 2 |
| Stevenage (loan) | 2014–15 | League Two | 12 | 0 | 2 | 0 | — | | — | | 14 | 0 |
| Stevenage | 2014–15 | League Two | 4 | 0 | — | | — | | — | | 4 | 0 |
| Stevenage | 2015–16 | League Two | 1 | 0 | 0 | 0 | 1 | 0 | 0 | 0 | 2 | 0 |
| Stevenage | Total | | 17 | 0 | 2 | 0 | 1 | 0 | 0 | 0 | 20 | 0 |
| Shamrock Rovers | 2017 | LOI Premier Division | 25 | 4 | 2 | 0 | 2 | 0 | 4 (Note: Appearance(s) in UEFA Europa League) | 0 | 33 | 4 |
| Shamrock Rovers | 2018 | LOI Premier Division | 14 | 2 | 0 | 0 | 1 | 0 | 1 | 0 | 16 | 2 |
| Shamrock Rovers | Total | | 39 | 6 | 2 | 0 | 3 | 0 | 5 | 0 | 49 | 6 |
| Career total | | | 210 | 36 | 13 | 2 | 12 | 1 | 14 | 4 | 249 | 43 |

== Honours ==
Shrewsbury Town

- EFL League Two second-place promotion: 2011–2012
