= Diego De Girolamo =

Footballer (born 1995)

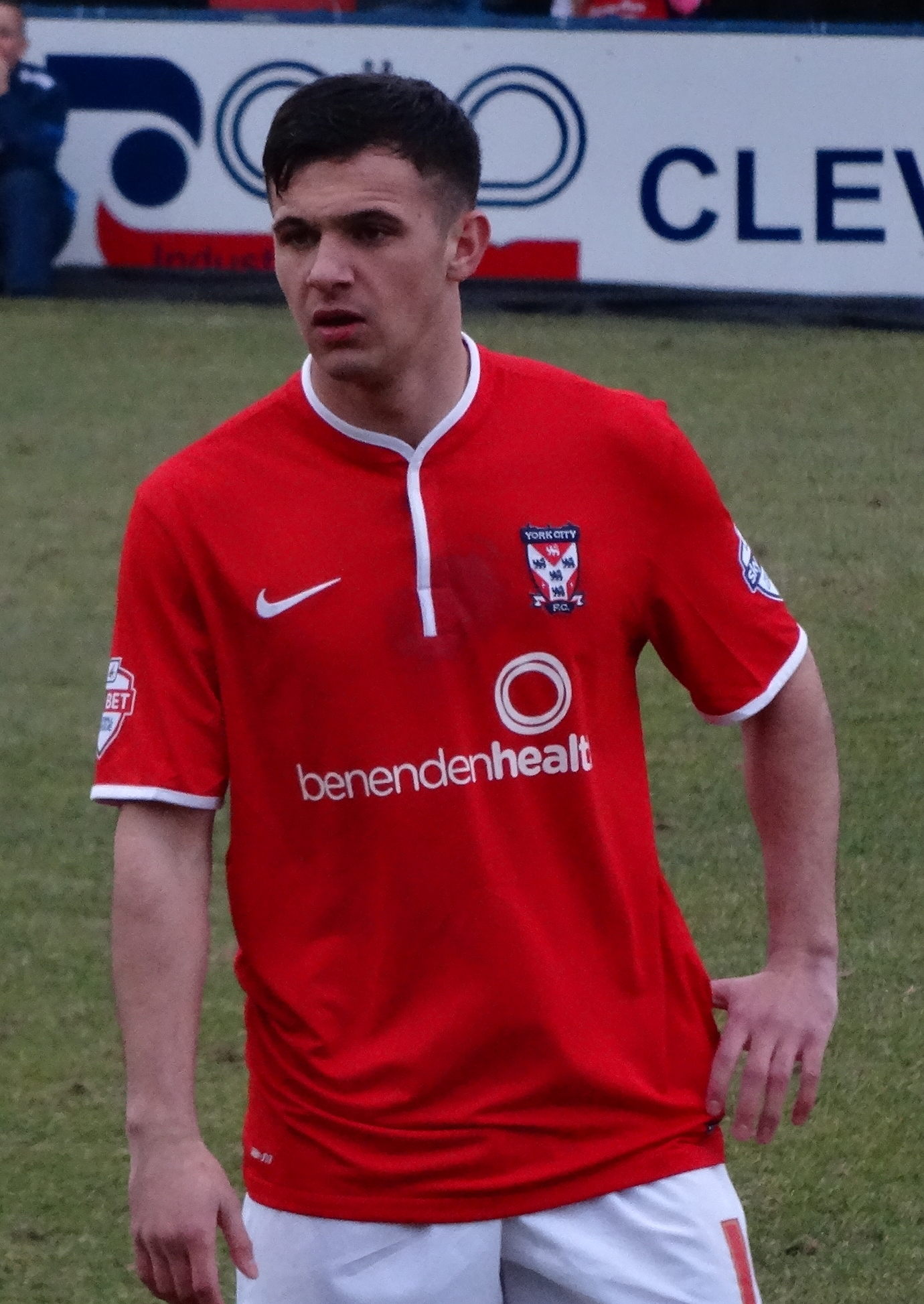
- De Girolamo playing for York City in 2015

Personal information
- Full name: Diego Raymond De Girolamo
- Date of birth: 5 October 1995 (age 31)
- Place of birth: Chesterfield, England
- Height: 5 ft 10 in (1.78 m)
- Position: Forward

Team information
- Current team: Emley

Youth career
- 2002–2012: Sheffield United

Senior career*
Years	Team	Apps	(Gls)
2012–2016	Sheffield United	2	(0)
2014	→ York City (loan)	4	(3)
2014–2015	→ York City (loan)	4	(1)
2015	→ York City (loan)	4	(0)
2015	→ Northampton Town (loan)	6	(0)
2016–2018	Bristol City	0	(0)
2017	→ Cheltenham Town (loan)	5	(1)
2017–2018	→ Chesterfield (loan)	16	(0)
2018	Macclesfield Town	0	(0)
2018–2025	Buxton	164	(76)
2025	→ Macclesfield (loan)	8	(1)
2025	Matlock Town		
2025–2026	Belper Town		
2026–	Emley		

International career^{‡}
2013	Italy U18	5	(3)
2014	Italy U19	1	(1)
2014	Italy U20	2	(0)
- * Club domestic league appearances and goals as of 21:23, 28 April 2025 (UTC) ‡ National team caps and goals as of 18:13, 23 March 2018 (UTC)

Diego Raymond De Girolamo (born 5 October 1995) is a professional footballer who plays as a forward for Northern Premier League Premier Division club Emley. Born in England, he was capped for the Italy under-18, under-19 and under-20 national teams.

De Girolamo came through the youth academy at Sheffield United before signing a professional contract. He had three loan spells with League Two club York City during the 2014–15 season. He finished the season on loan with another League Two club, Northampton Town. After being released by United, De Girolamo joined Championship club Bristol City in July 2016, spending the second half of 2016–17 on loan at League Two club Cheltenham Town. He joined another League Two club, Chesterfield, on loan for the 2017–18 season.

== Early and personal life ==
De Girolamo was born in Chesterfield, Derbyshire. His father is Italian, hailing from Naples, thus providing De Girolamo with his eligibility to play for Italy.

== Club career ==
=== Sheffield United ===
De Girolamo came through the youth system of Sheffield United from the age of seven, and despite interest from Manchester United and Manchester City, he signed a three-year professional contract with the club at the end of October 2012. At the start of that December, he made his first-team debut in the quarter-final of the Football League Trophy against Coventry City at the Ricoh Arena. De Girolamo's first league appearance for United came in a victory over Colchester United in February 2013, where he replaced Ryan Flynn as a last minute substitute, providing an assist for Dave Kitson to score the final goal in a 3–0 victory. After one further appearance for United, De Girolamo picked up an anterior cruciate ligament injury to his knee whilst playing for Italy under-18s in March, which kept him out of first-team contention for nine months, not returning to full training until early December 2013. De Girolamo returned to United's first team on 7 October 2014 as they won 2–1 away to Hartlepool United in the Football League Trophy.

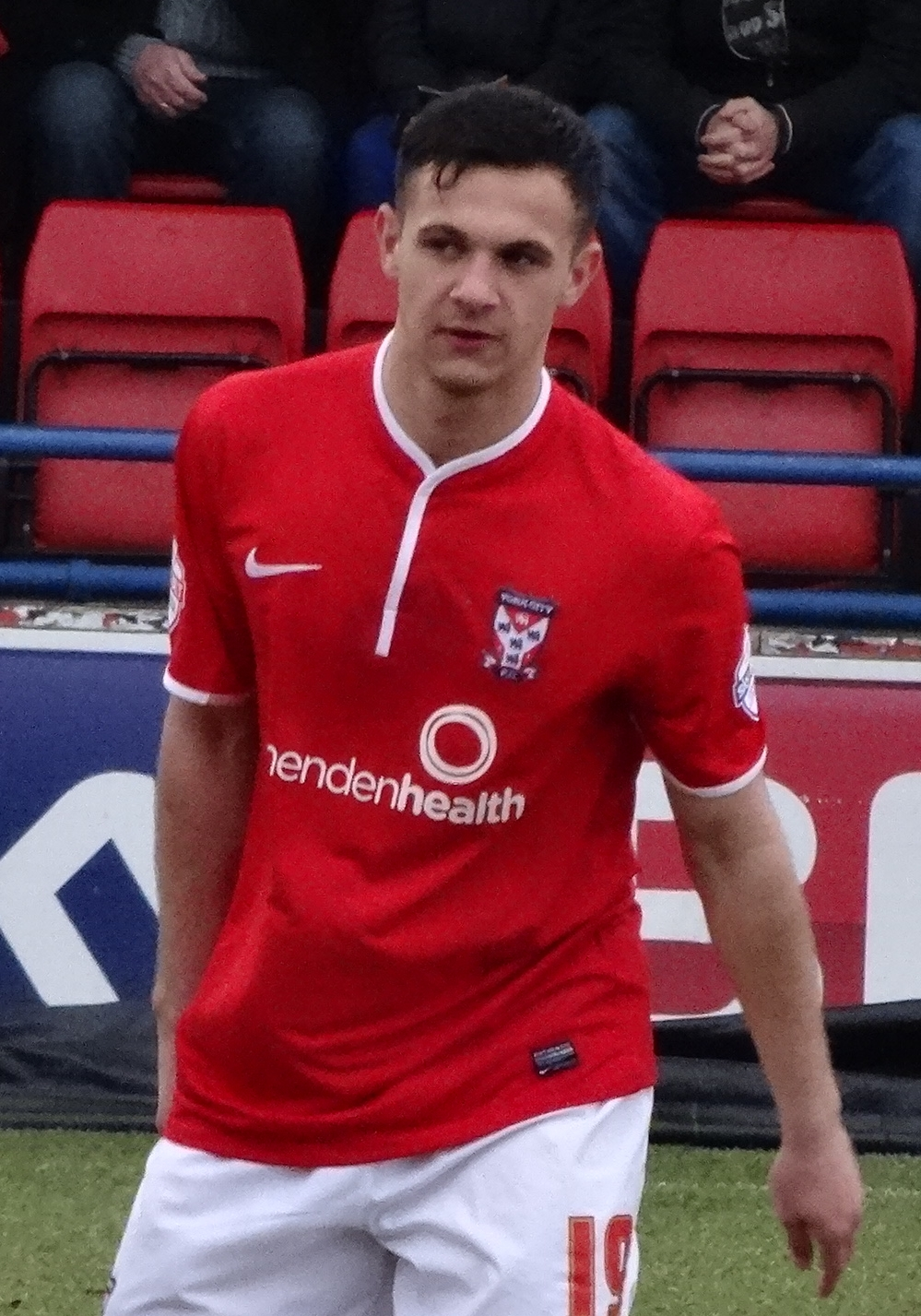
De Girolamo playing for York City in 2015

De Girolamo joined League Two club York City on 9 October 2014 on a one-month youth loan deal, and scored on his debut two days later with the opening goal of a 3–1 away defeat to Newport County. On 4 November 2014, De Girolamo was recalled early from his loan spell at York City having scored three goals in four matches, so he could be available for United's two upcoming cup fixtures. He made three appearances for United before rejoining York on 26 November 2014 on another youth loan, with the deal expiring on 4 January 2015. De Girolamo scored one goal in four appearances before returning to United, who wanted to strengthen their striking options before considering letting him return to York. He scored his first goal for United as they drew 1–1 away to Preston North End in the fourth round of FA Cup on 24 January 2015, earning a replay at Bramall Lane.

De Girolamo declined a new contract with Sheffield United on 31 January 2015. On 16 February 2015, United manager Nigel Clough confirmed that De Girolamo would be leaving United at the end of the 2014–15 season stating that "he's rejected his contract offer and the chance to stay here... We've got Matt Done who has come in and Marc McNulty is a better player than Diego and he can't get on at the moment." The following day he was loaned to York again, this time for the remainder of 2014–15. Having made four appearances in his third spell with York, he left the club to join their League Two rivals Northampton Town on 19 March 2015 on loan for the rest of 2014–15, explaining that "Northampton play attractive football and express myself by getting on the ball a lot". He made his debut in Northampton's 2–1 away defeat to Bury on 21 March 2015, and finished the loan spell with six appearances. Despite having expressed his desire to leave United, he was offered another new contract by the club in May 2015. De Girolamo signed a new two-year contract with the club on 13 July 2015, having initially rejected a new offer.

=== Bristol City ===
De Girolamo was transfer listed by United manager Chris Wilder in May 2016, before leaving by mutual consent in June. On 7 July 2016, he joined Championship club Bristol City to play in their development squad, signing a one-year contract with the option of another year. On 1 January 2017, De Girolamo joined League Two club Cheltenham Town on loan until the end of 2016–17, having struggled to break into the team at Bristol City. He scored his first goals for Cheltenham when he scored a hat-trick in an EFL Trophy tie against Leicester City Under-23s on 10 January 2017.

On 30 August 2017, De Girolamo joined League Two club Chesterfield on loan for 2017–18. His contract with Bristol City was terminated by mutual consent On 31 January 2018. On 22 March 2018, he signed for National League club Macclesfield Town on non-contract terms for the rest of 2017–18.

=== Non-League ===
In 2018, De Girolamo joined Northern Premier League Premier Division side Buxton, working part-time as a tiler alongside playing.

In February 2025, De Girolamo joined Northern Premier League Premier Division leaders Macclesfield on loan for the remainder of the season.

In May 2025, he joined Matlock Town, who had just been relegated from the Northern Premier League Premier Division.

== International career ==
De Girolamo is eligible to represent both England and Italy at international level, prompting a tug-of-war between the England and Italy under-18 sides for his services. De Girolamo opted for Italy after Italian football legend Arrigo Sacchi personally rang him in a plea for him to represent Italy. In January 2013 De Girolamo was called up by the Italian under-18 team for the Granatkin Memorial, and made his debut as a 68th-minute substitute in a 1–0 victory over Belgium on 6 January 2013. He went on to play in every game in the tournament, scoring twice in two starts during the knock-out phase against Iran and the Czech Republic. De Girolamo earned his second call-up to the under-18s in a friendly match against Austria U-18s on 6 March 2013. De Girolamo scored in the 2–1 defeat, but also sustained suspected ligament damage to his knee, ruling him out for the remainder of the season.

Following his recovery from injury, he was called up to the Italy under-19 squad for a friendly against Germany under-19s in March 2014, scoring in a 1–1 draw. In September 2014, De Girolamo was called up to the Italy under-20 squad for a four-team friendly tournament to be played that month, appearing against Poland on 9 September.

== Career statistics ==
As of match played 19 April 2025

Appearances and goals by club, season and competition
Club	Season	League			FA Cup		League Cup		Other		Total	
Club	Season	Division	Apps	Goals	Apps	Goals	Apps	Goals	Apps	Goals	Apps	Goals
Sheffield United	2012–13	League One	2	0	0	0	0	0	1 (Note: Appearance(s) in Football League Trophy)	0	3	0
Sheffield United	2013–14	League One	0	0	0	0	0	0	0	0	0	0
Sheffield United	2014–15	League One	0	0	4	1	0	0	2	0	6	1
Sheffield United	2015–16	League One	0	0	0	0	1	0	0	0	1	0
Sheffield United	Total		2	0	4	1	1	0	3	0	10	1
York City (loan)	2014–15	League Two	12	4	—		—		—		12	4
Northampton Town (loan)	2014–15	League Two	6	0	—		—		—		6	0
Bristol City	2016–17	Championship	0	0	0	0	1	0	—		1	0
Bristol City	2017–18	Championship	0	0	—		0	0	—		0	0
Bristol City	Total		0	0	0	0	1	0	—		1	0
Cheltenham Town (loan)	2016–17	League Two	5	1	—		—		2 (Note: Appearance(s) in EFL Trophy)	3	7	4
Chesterfield (loan)	2017–18	League Two	15	0	0	0	—		3	1	18	1
Macclesfield Town	2017–18	National League	0	0	—		—		—		0	0
Buxton	2018–19	NPL Premier Division	14	2	—		—		4 (Note: Appearance(s) in FA Trophy and NPL Challenge Cup)	2	18	4
Buxton	2019–20	NPL Premier Division	26	18	2	1	—		3	3	31	22
Buxton	2020–21	NPL Premier Division	8	8	1	0	—		2 (Note: Appearance(s) in FA Trophy)	1	11	9
Buxton	2021–22	NPL Premier Division	28	20	8	7	—		1	0	37	27
Buxton	2022–23	National League North	39	9	3	1	—		0	0	42	10
Buxton	2023–24	National League North	32	16	1	0	—		0	0	33	16
Buxton	2024–25	National League North	17	3	3	3	—		1	0	21	6
Buxton	Total		164	76	18	12	0	0	11	6	193	94
Macclesfield	2024–25	NPL Premier Division	8	1	—		—		—		8	1
Career total			212	82	22	13	2	0	19	10	255	105
