= 2014–15 Sheffield United F.C. season =

Sheffield United
2014–15 season
- Group Chairman: Abdullah bin Musa'ed bin Abdulaziz Al Saud (50%); Kevin McCabe (50%)
- Chairman: Kevin McCabe; Jim Phipps (Co-group Chairman); David Green (Football Club Chairman)
- Manager: Nigel Clough
- Stadium: Bramall Lane
- League One: 5th
- Play-offs: Semi-finals (eliminated by Swindon Town)
- FA Cup: Fourth round (eliminated by Preston North End)
- League Cup: Semi-finals (eliminated by Tottenham Hotspur)
- Football League Trophy: Area quarter finals (eliminated by Walsall)
- Top goalscorer: League: Jamie Murphy (11); All: Jose Baxter/Marc McNulty (13)
- Highest home attendance: 26,078 (vs Chesterfield)
- Lowest home attendance: 17,030 (vs MK Dons)
- Average home league attendance: 19,805
| Home colours | Away colours |

Sheffield United Football Club participated in League One, the third level of English football, during the 2014–15 season.

== Kit ==
In April 2014, United announced that they had agreed a deal with German sportswear company Adidas to produce the team kit for the 2014–15 season and beyond, ending the club's previous association with Macron. This was followed in June with DBL Logistics being unveiled as the club's secondary shirt sponsor until 2016, and in July by the announcement of luxury car dealers, John Holland Sales as the club's main shirt sponsor. In September United released a third kit, featuring a yellow and black shirt, sponsored by Topspring. On 17 October, Sheffield United announced a two-year deal with local business Blue Portal Telecoms with their logo appearing on the shorts of the first team.

== Season overview ==
=== Pre-season ===
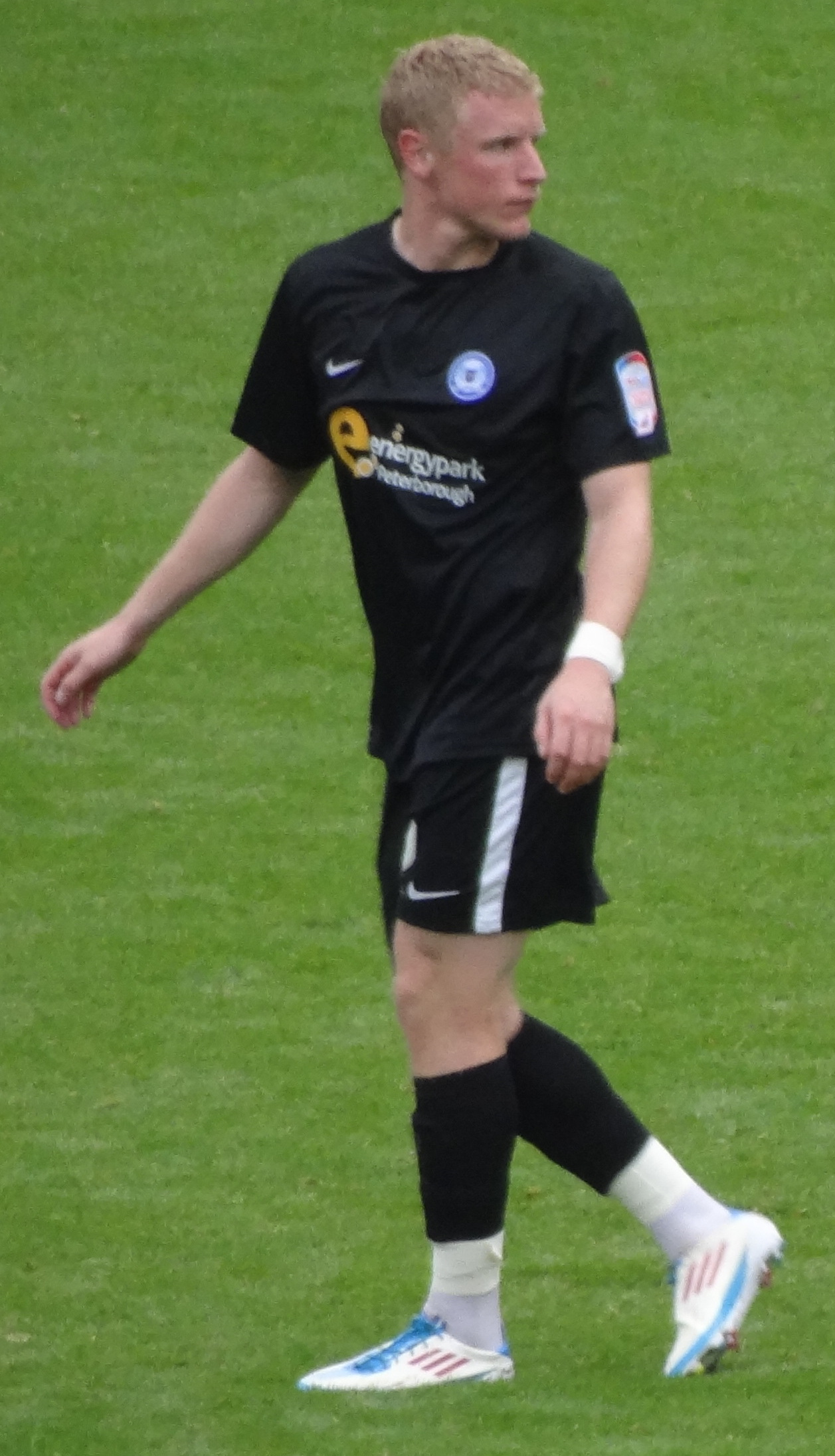
Craig Alcock joined United in July 2014.

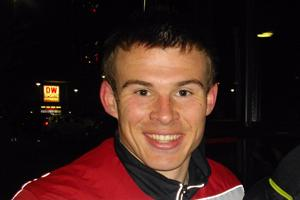
South Yorkshire born Andy Butler joined United in June 2014.

On 16 May 2014, Sheffield United released their retained list; Darryl Westlake, Matt Hill, Shaun Miller, Sean McGinty, Elliott Whitehouse, Jasper Johns, Jordan Hodder and Jahmal Smith were all released. Chris Porter was also on the released list, however Nigel Clough confirmed that the club was still in negotiation with him over a new contract. The retained list also confirmed that Mark Howard, Bob Harris and Terry Kennedy had all had their contracts extended. Three days later United signed Jamal Campbell-Ryce on a two-year deal after his release from Notts County, and paid an undisclosed fee to Livingston for Marc McNulty who signed a three-year deal. On 5 June, United announced another double signing with Chris Basham joining on a three-year deal from Blackpool and South Yorkshire born Andy Butler joining on a two-year deal from Walsall. The subsequent week both Ben Davies and Chris Porter signed one-year deals, followed another week later by Tranmere Rovers midfielder James Wallace. As manager Nigel Clough continued to reshape his squad there was continued speculation around the future of defender Harry Maguire with reported interest from Hull City and Wolverhampton Wanderers, with offers of around £1.5 million being rejected by United. On 25 June, Febian Brandy was released halfway through his two-year contract, exactly a year to the day from him joining the club. The following week, striker Lyle Taylor was sold to Scunthorpe United for an undisclosed fee after only a year at Bramall Lane. Meanwhile, off the field, co-owner Prince Abdullah was appointed to a government role in his home nation of Saudi Arabia and as such stepped down from his position on the board, installing his advisor Jim Phipps as his replacement in the role of co-chairman.

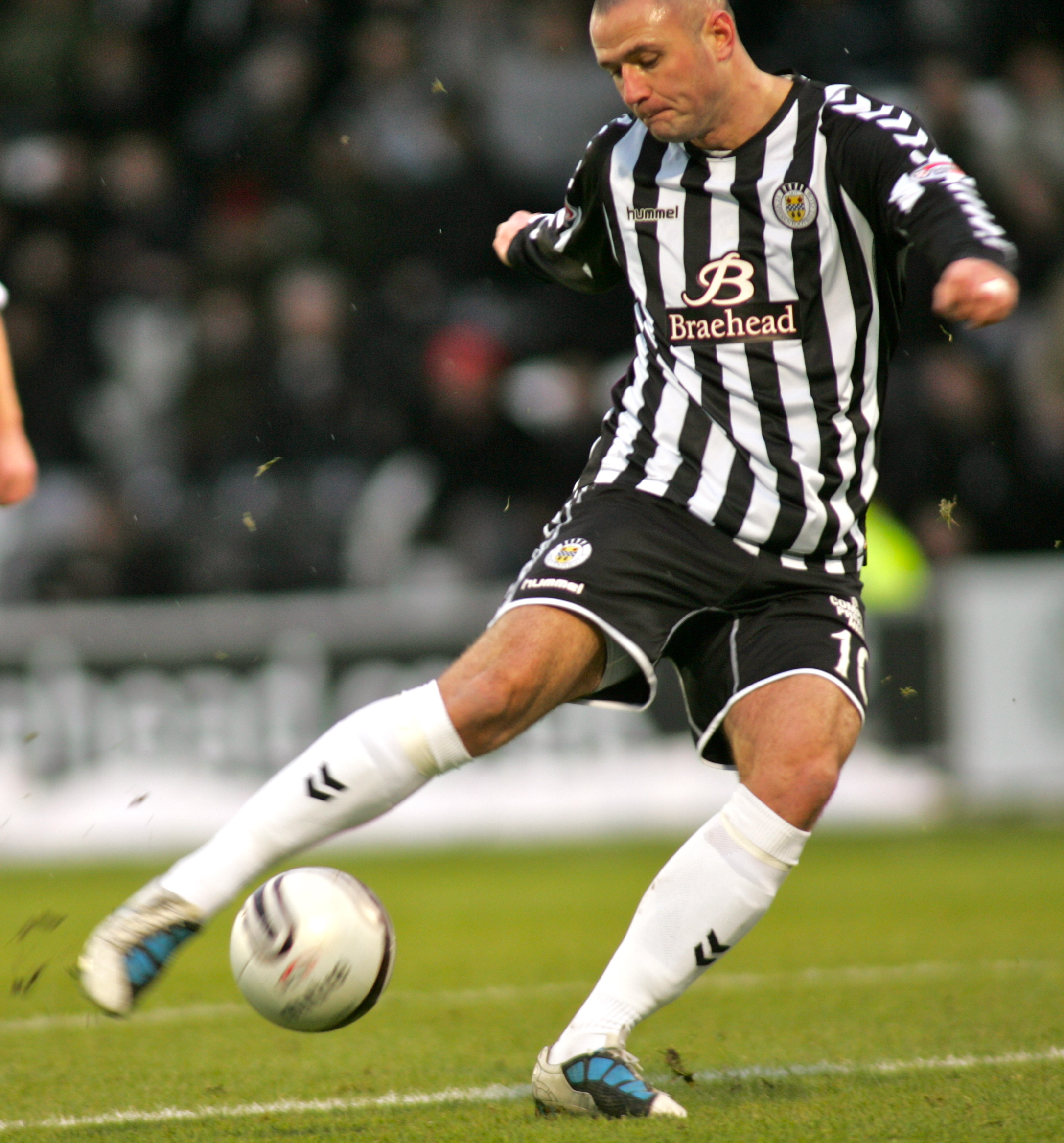
Striker Michael Higdon joined United in August 2014.

July began with Callum McFadzean joining Burton Albion on a six-month loan deal, and with pre-season training underway, defender Craig Alcock was added to the squad on 15 July. Three days later another defender was added to the squad as Blackpool youngster Harrison McGahey was signed for an undisclosed fee. United kicked off their pre-season fixture list on 19 July but suffered a disappointing 4–0 defeat at Burton Albion with Callum McFadzean, on loan from the Blades, numbering amongst Burton's goal scorers. A trip to Northampton Town the following week earned United a better result as they drew 1–1 with their hosts. On 25 July, George Long joined Oxford United on a six-month loan deal, while the same evening United recorded their first win of pre-season when they beat Scottish Premiership side Dundee 4–2 at Bramall Lane. On 29 July, incumbent Player of the Year, Harry Maguire, was sold to Premier League side Hull City for £2.5 million after months of speculation about his future at Bramall Lane. The same evening the Blades suffered a narrow 1–0 home defeat at the hands of Huddersfield Town in the latest of their pre-season friendlies. Two days later United beat Turkish Süper Lig champions Fenerbahçe 2–1 in a charity friendly in aid of the Soma mine disaster, before completing their pre-season fixture list with a 2–0 loss to York City at Bootham Crescent on 2 August 2014. With the start of the new season imminent, on 4 August United signed experienced striker Michael Higdon from Dutch side N.E.C. Nijmegen for an undisclosed fee on a two-year contract.

=== August and September: Late goals and a slow start ===
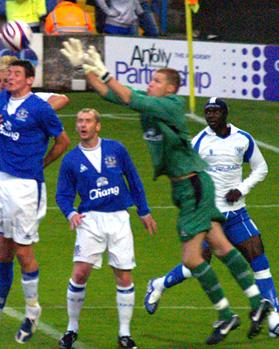
Goalkeeper Iain Turner joined in August 2014.

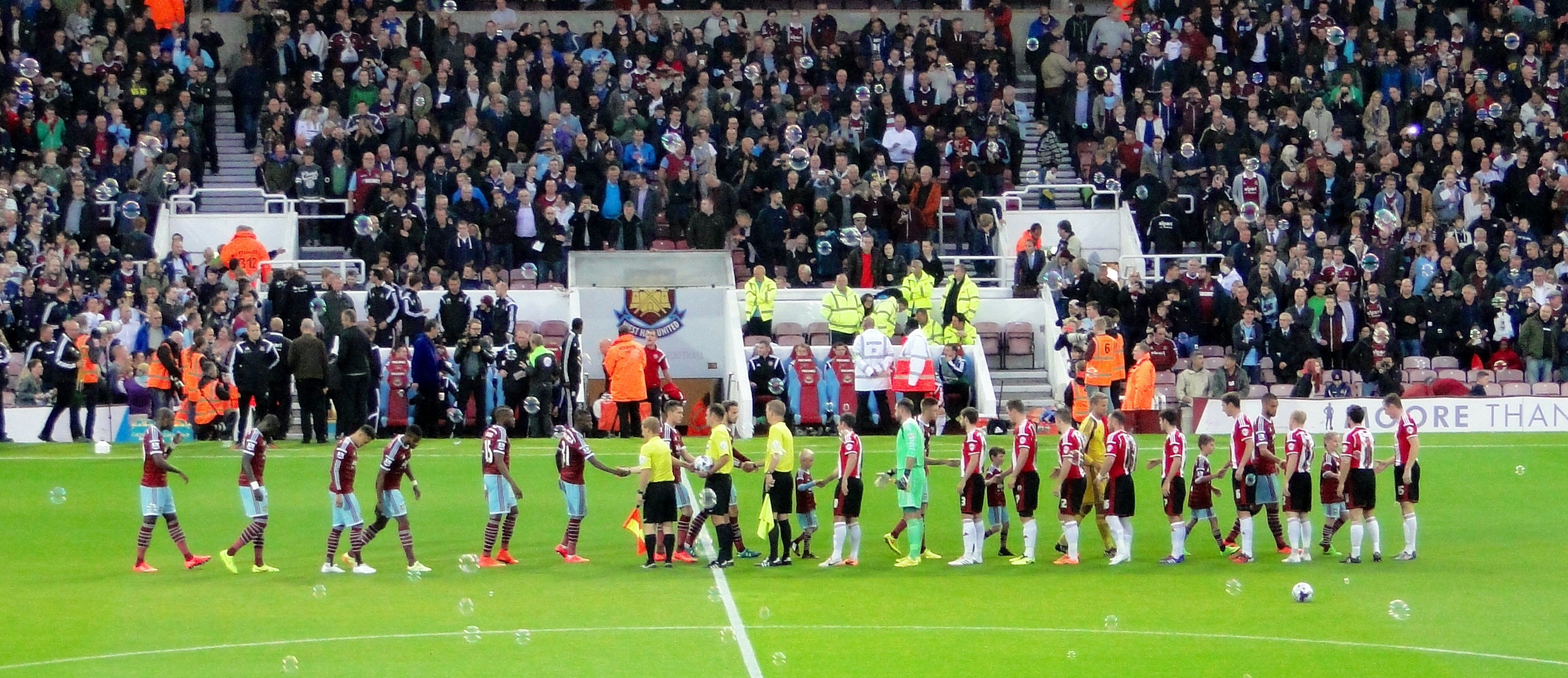
The Blades ahead of their Football League Cup victory against West Ham United at Upton Park in August.

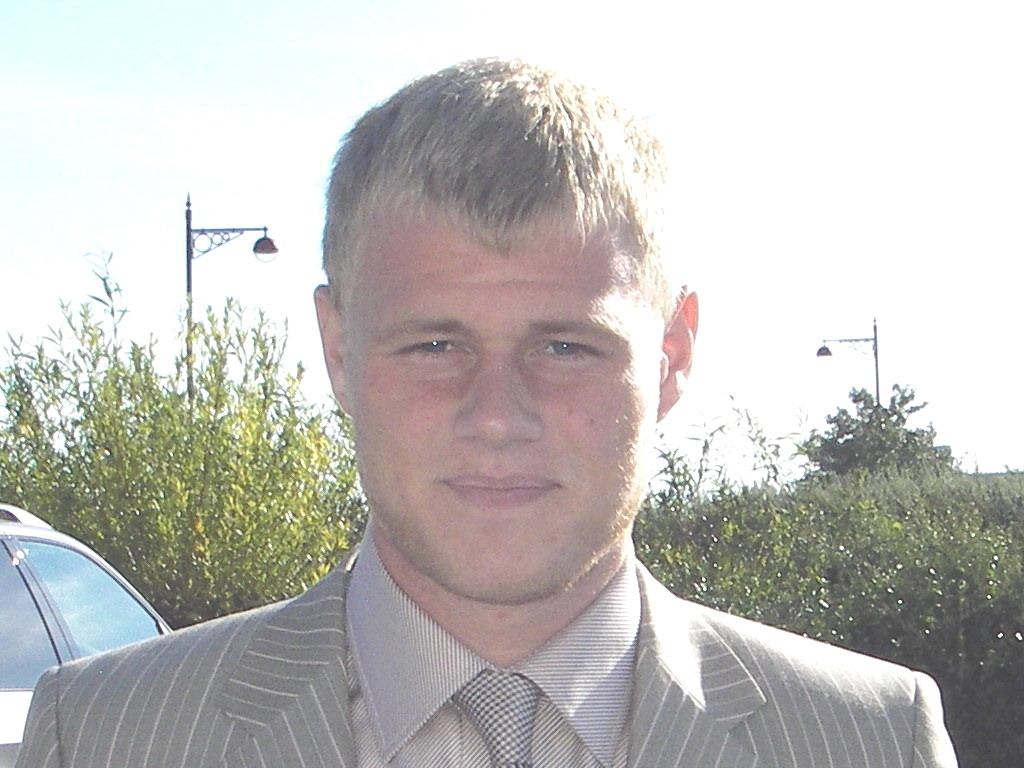
Defender Jay McEveley joined United in August 2014.

United kicked off their league campaign with a lunchtime fixture in front of the television cameras. With six of the summer signings making their competitive débuts for the Blades, United were edged out in a 2–1 defeat to Bristol City. Later that week youngster Louis Reed signed a three-year professional contract with the Blades, before United's first win of the season came in the first round of League Cup against Mansfield Town. On 15 August, United announced the signing of defender Jay McEveley on a one-year deal and goalkeeper Iain Turner on a six-month deal, with striker Joe Ironside joining Alfreton Town on a one-month loan deal a day later. Back in the league United lost 1–0 away at Coventry City. The following match saw United earn their first three points of the season in a 2–1 victory away at Peterborough United. This was followed by a 1–0 home victory over Crawley Town. On 26 August, United progressed to the third round of the League Cup after beating West Ham United on penalties. Back in the league, United rounded off August with a 1–1 away draw at Preston North End with Jose Baxter getting his third goal in three league games.

Following the international break Andy Butler re-joined former club Walsall on an initial one-month loan, and academy product George Willis joined Bradford Park Avenue on a short-term deal. Returning the league action, United beat Rochdale 1–0 at Bramall Lane with Jamal Campbell-Ryce claiming his first goal for the club. On 16 September, the Blades secured an away victory Colchester United, winning 3–2 after coming from two goals down. On 20 September United's seven match unbeaten run came to an end away at Swindon Town in 5–2 defeat. Three days later, United returned to winning ways with a 1–0 away victory over Leyton Orient in the third round of the League Cup. United rounded off September with a 2–1 victory over Gillingham, scoring twice in the final two minutes to come from behind.

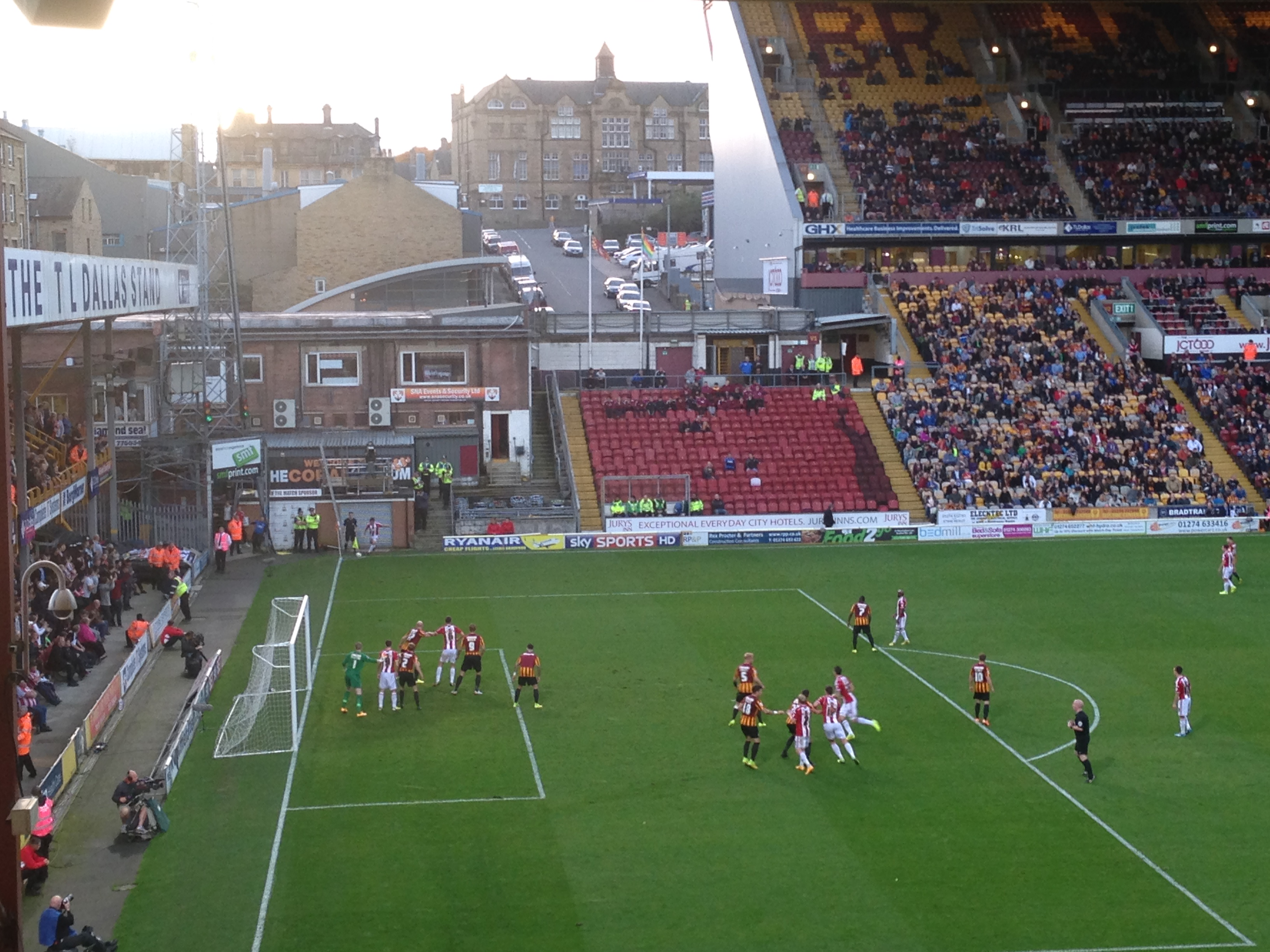
The Blades in the 2–0 win over Yorkshire rivals Bradford City at Valley Parade.

=== October and November: More late goals and Yorkshire derbys ===
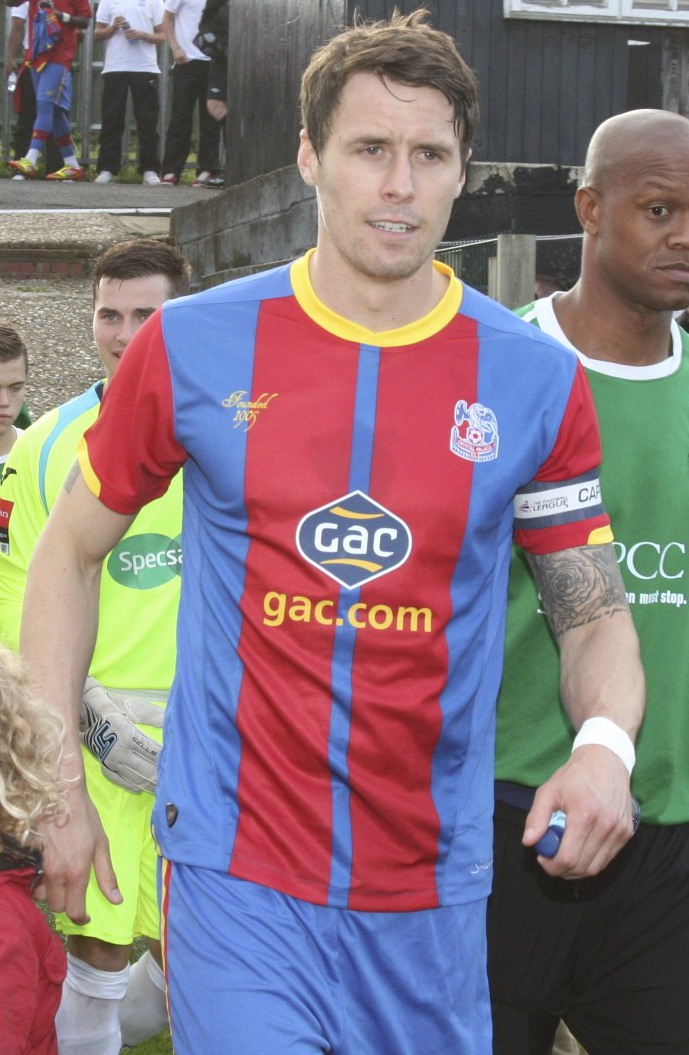
Paddy McCarthy joined on loan in October 2014.

October started with Paddy McCarthy joining United from Crystal Palace on an initial one-month loan. On 4 October, United lost 3–2 away at Chesterfield with Michael Higdon receiving a red card. The Blades' next match was in the Football League Trophy, winning 2–1 away at Hartlepool United on 7 October, two days before Diego De Girolamo joined York City on a short-term loan deal. Back in the league United needed late goals to come from behind again to record a 2–2 draw against Leyton Orient. Seven days later they were 2–0 victors in a televised away fixture against Bradford City as defender Bob Harris scored his first goal in the club's colours and Marc McNulty netted his fifth of the season. Three days later, United made it two wins on the bounce with a 2–0 home win against Yeovil Town. On 23 October, Andy Butler was sent out on loan to home-town club Doncaster Rovers until January. United made it three wins and three clean sheets in three games with a 1–0 victory away at Crewe Alexandra on 25 October as Stefan Scougall scored his first goal of the season. United rounded off October with a 2–1 away victory over Milton Keynes Dons thanks to a late brace from Michael Higdon, which sent United to the last eight of the League Cup in the fifth round.

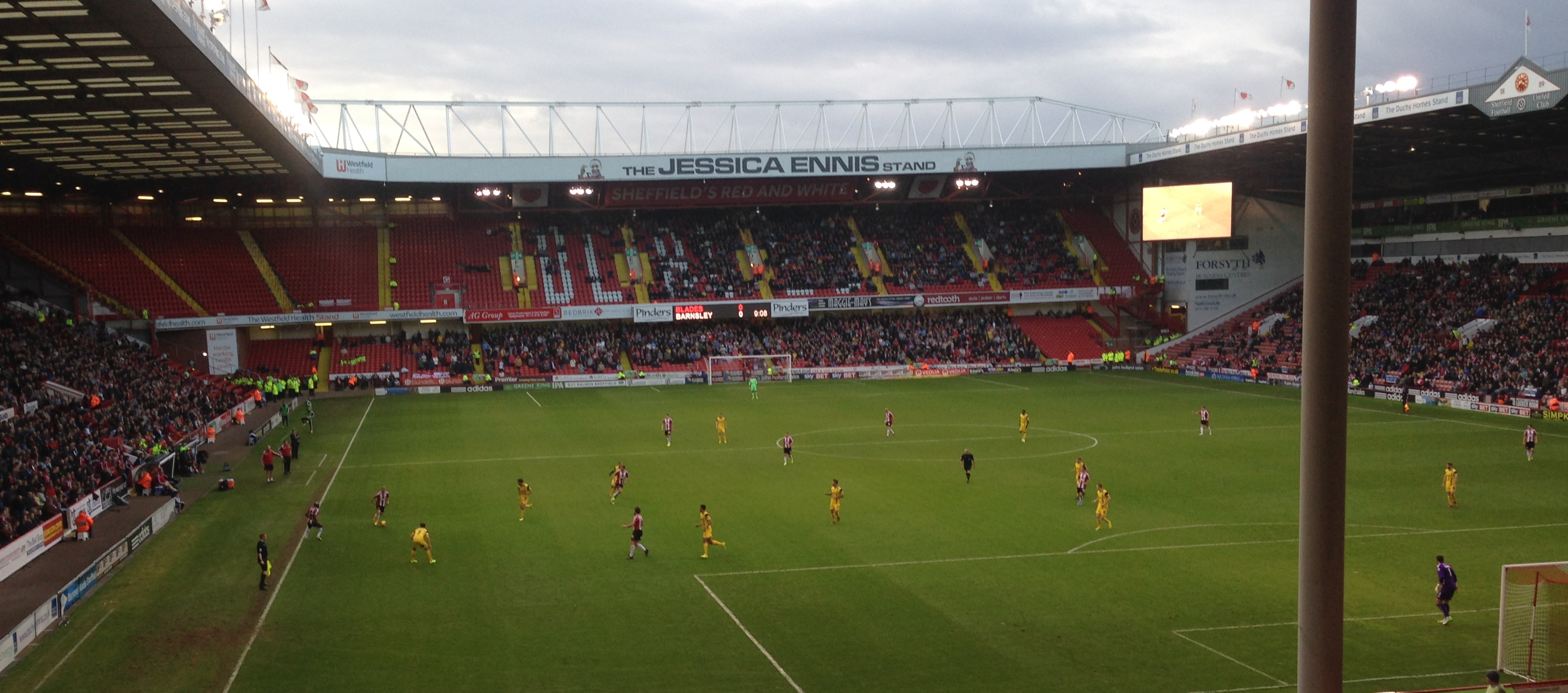
The Blades in the 1–0 loss to South Yorkshire rivals Barnsley at Bramall Lane.

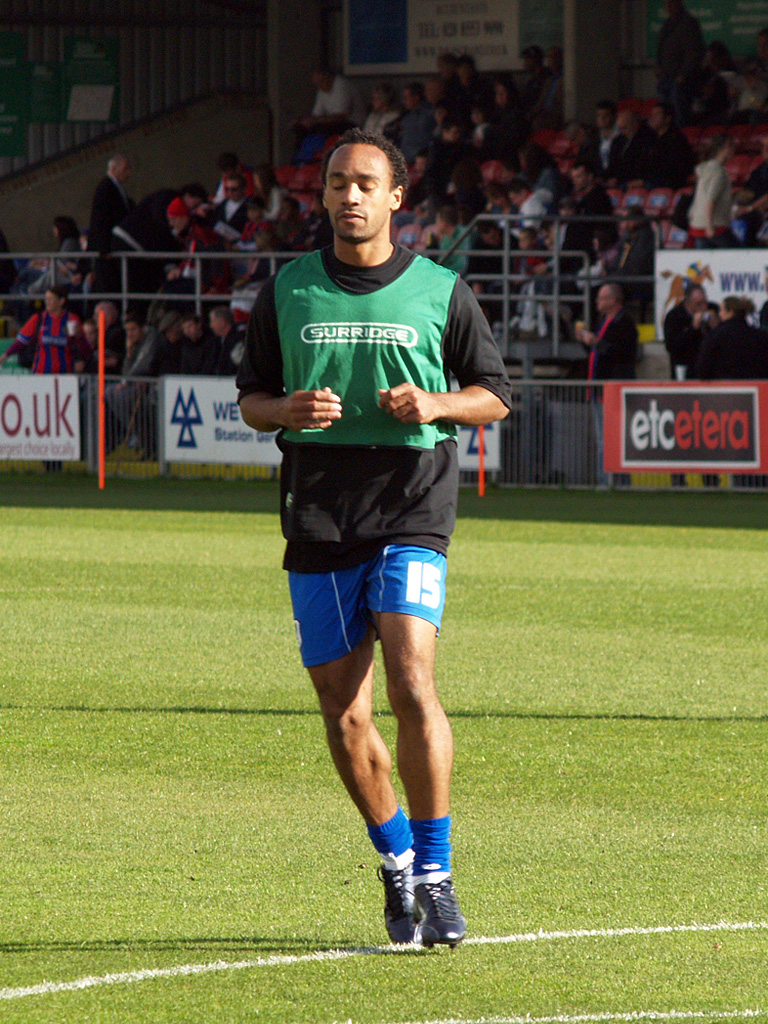
Chris O'Grady joined United on loan in November 2014.

November began with a 1–0 home defeat to local rivals Barnsley. On 4 November, Diego De Girolamo was recalled early from his loan spell at York City after fellow striker Michael Higdon had pulled his hamstring during training. On 8 November, United's first round FA Cup match resulted in a goalless draw away at Crewe Alexandra, meaning a replay of the match at Bramall Lane. On 12 November, United crashed out of the Football League Trophy in a 1–0 away loss to Walsall. On 13 November, it was confirmed that Paddy McCarthy's loan with United had been extended until the end of the calendar year. On 14 November, United signed 18-year-old striker Che Adams for an undisclosed fee from Ilkeston. United's first victory of the month came in a 1–0 win on 15 November in another Yorkshire derby away at Doncaster Rovers with United going down to ten men after Paddy McCarthy was shown the red card, then Mark Howard saved a penalty before Jamie Murphy scored at the other end; all in the space of under three minutes. On 18 November, United beat Crewe Alexandra 2–0 at Bramall Lane to progress to the second round of the FA Cup thanks to a brace from Ryan Flynn. On 22 November, Joe Ironside joined Hartlepool United on loan, later that day United drew 1–1 at home with Oldham Athletic with substitute Jamal Campbell-Ryce rescuing a point in the second half after United conceded early on. On 25 November, it was confirmed that George Long had been recalled early from his loan spell after Oxford United manager Michael Appleton revealed that Long was no longer part of his plans and had dropped Long from the first team. On loan transfer deadline day on 27 November, Diego De Girolamo rejoined York City on loan with the deal set to expire on 4 January, whilst United completed the loan signing of summer target Chris O'Grady from Brighton & Hove Albion until the end of January 2015. The following day United completed the signing of Kieran Wallace from Ilkeston on a deal until the end of the season whilst academy product CJ Hamilton joined Mickleover Sports on a youth loan. That evening, United ended the month with a 1–1 draw at home to Notts County.

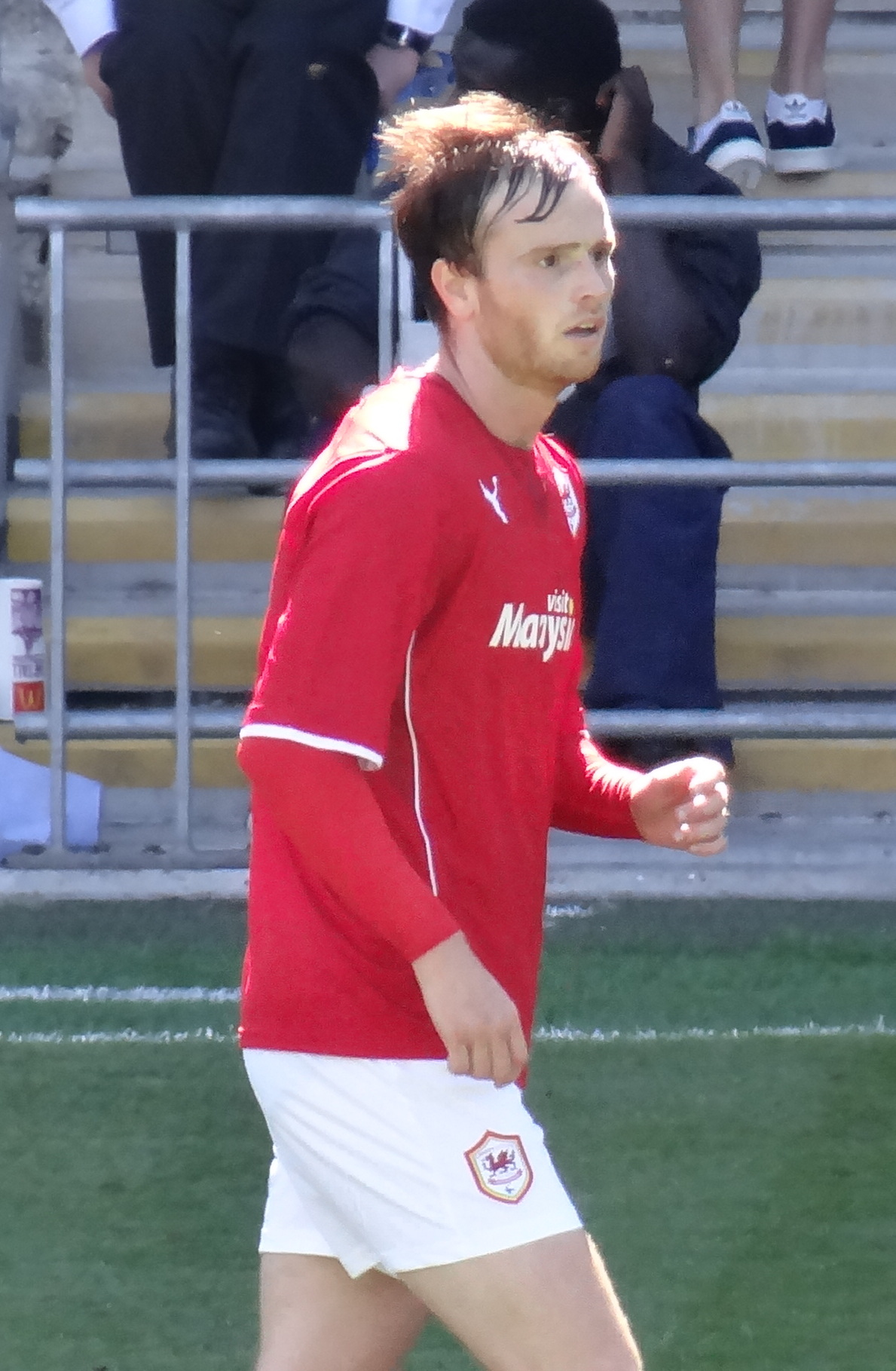
Former loanee John Brayford joined United permanently in January 2015.

=== December and January: Cup Runs and Return of the Beard ===
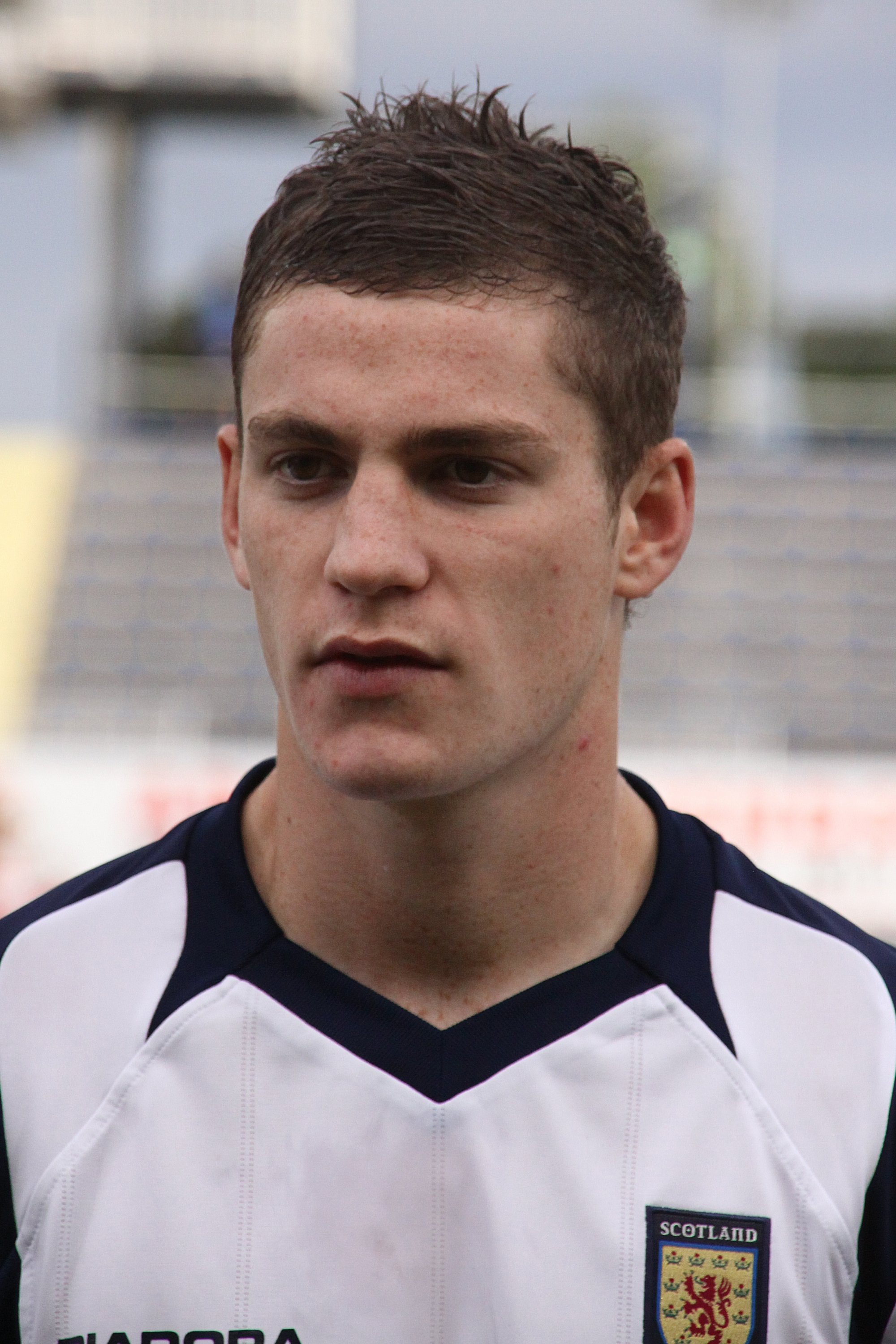
Paul Coutts joined United in January 2015.

December began with a 1–0 home loss to Milton Keynes Dons. The following weekend, United were 3–0 victors over Plymouth Argyle as Jose Baxter converted two penalties to send United to the third round of the FA Cup. On 13 December, Sheffield United's first ever senior match with Fleetwood Town ended in a 1–1 away draw as youngster Kieran Wallace made his professional début. On 16 December 2014, Marc McNulty scored the only goal in a 1–0 home victory over Southampton to send United to the semi-finals of the League Cup with youngster Che Adams making his senior début. Back in the league United had another draw, this time at home to Walsall on 20 December with Chris O'Grady scoring his first goal in United's colours. On 26 December, United's poor form in the league continued with a 2–1 away loss at Port Vale. On 29 December, Brighton & Hove recalled O'Grady from his loan spell at United due to a striker shortage. On 30 December, Sheffield United were fined £4,000 by The Football Association for failing to control the behaviour of coaching staff, in particular first-team coach Chris Morgan during the League Cup victory over Southampton. The following day, Joe Ironside returned from his loan spell at Hartlepool United.

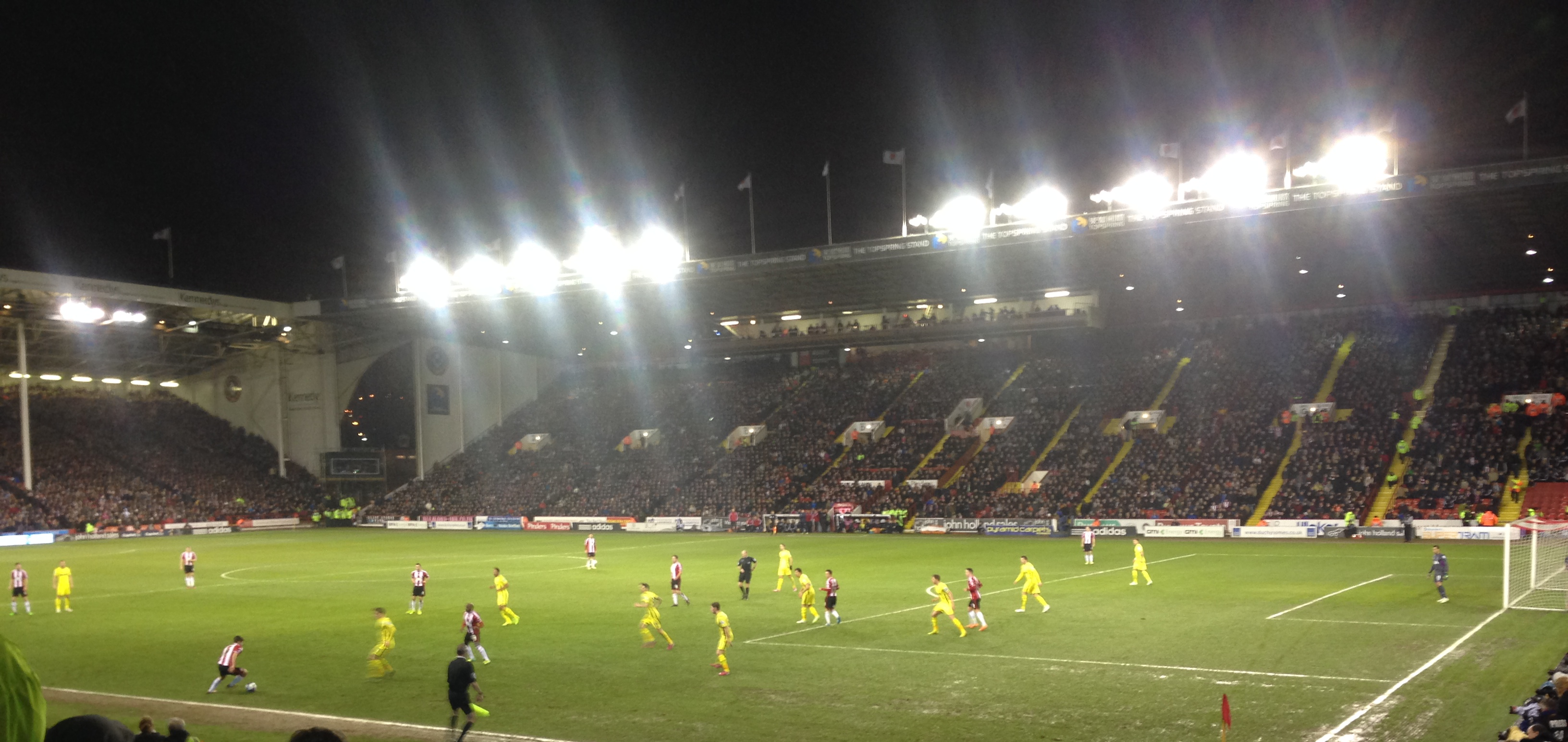
The Blades in the Football League Cup Semi-finals with Tottenham Hotpsur at Bramall Lane in January.

January began with a 3–0 away victory over Queens Park Rangers of the Premier League with Jamal Campbell-Ryce scoring a second half brace. Paddy McCarthy returned to Crystal Palace at the start of January and on 6 January, Andy Butler was sold to hometown club Doncaster Rovers for an undisclosed fee. On 10 January, United beat promotion rivals Preston North End 2–1 at Bramall Lane with Marc McNulty scoring his tenth goal of the campaign. On 15 January, youngster Joe Ironside was released by United and joined Alfreton Town on an 18-month deal. On 16 January, youngsters Otis Khan and Julian Banton joined Matlock Town on loan. United's first loss of the calendar year came on 17 January at the hands of Milton Keynes Dons in a 1–0 defeat. On 21 January, Tottenham Hotspur took a 1–0 lead in the first leg of the League Cup semi-finals at White Hart Lane with Andros Townsend converting a penalty after Jay McEveley accidentally handled the ball in the box. On 22 January, Chris Porter joined Colchester United on an 18-month deal after being released by the Blades. On 23 January, United brought in two players from Nigel Clough's former club Derby County, midfielder Paul Coutts who signed for an undisclosed fee and former loanee from last season Kieron Freeman joined on a free transfer; both players signed a two-and-a-half-year contracts. The following day United announced the signing of John Brayford from Cardiff City on a three-and-a-half-year deal for an undisclosed fee. The same day, United drew 1–1 away at Preston North End in the fourth round of FA Cup, with Diego De Girolamo scoring his first goal for the club, earning a replay at Bramall Lane. In the League Cup semi-final second leg against Tottenham Hotspur on 28 January 2015 at Bramall Lane, with Spurs winning 1–0 at half time, Che Adams replaced Jamal Campbell-Ryce after 74 minutes and five minutes later he had scored his first goals for Sheffield United with two goals in just over two minutes, which would have taken the game to extra time had Christian Eriksen not scored his second goal of the match for Tottenham Hotspur in the 88th minute to win 3–2 on aggregate. On 30 January, Stephen McGinn joined Dundee on loan for the remainder of the season, youngster Jamie McDonagh joined Matlock Town on loan and Jason Holt joined United on loan from Heart of Midlothian for the rest of the season. The following day Jamie Murphy signed a new two-year contract and Terry Kennedy signed a new one-year contract however Diego De Girolamo declined a new contract with the club. Later that day, United rounded off January with a 2–0 home victory over promotion rivals Swindon Town with Jamie Murphy coming off the bench in the second half and scoring a brace.

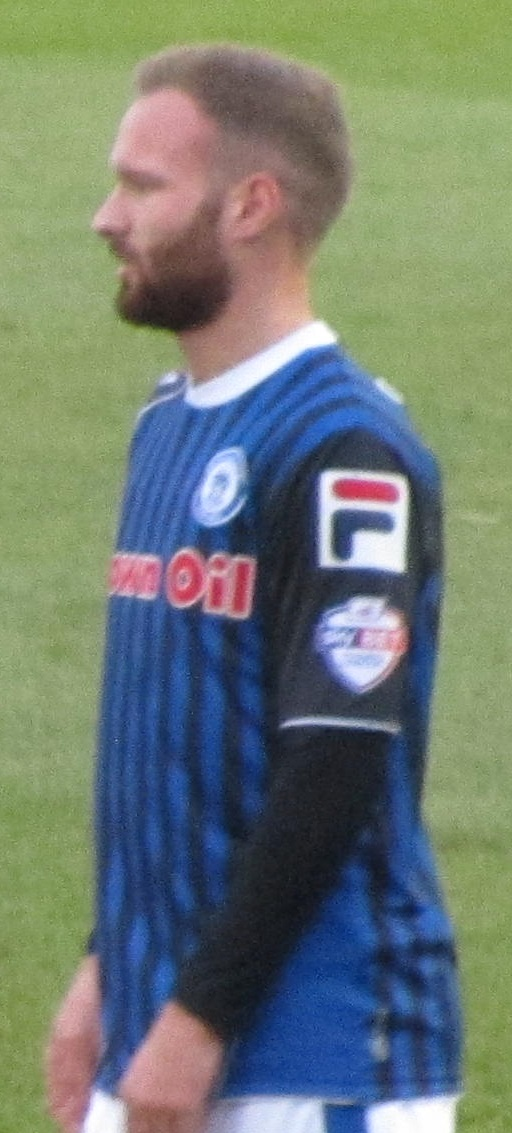
Striker Matt Done joined United in February 2015.

=== February and March: Inconsistency ===
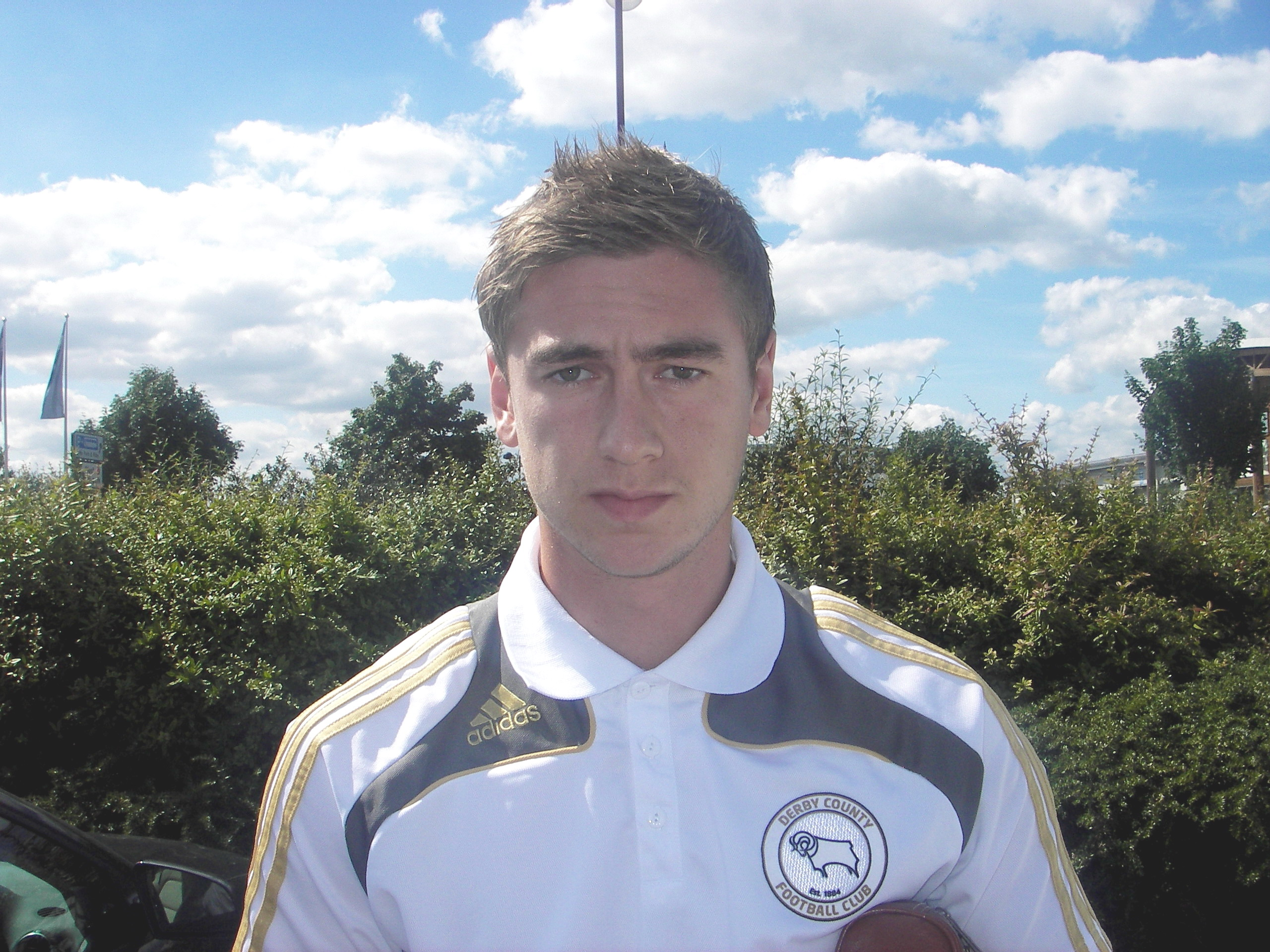
Steve Davies joined United on loan in March 2015.

Transfer deadline day on 2 February saw two players leave Bramall Lane and one arrive. Stephen McGinn's loan to Dundee was made permanent after his United contract was cancelled by mutual consent and George Long went on loan to Motherwell for the rest of the season. Coming into Bramall lane saw Rochdale's Matt Done join United for an undisclosed fee on a two-and-a-half-year deal. On 3 February, United were knocked out of the FA Cup in the fourth round replay as they lost 3–1 at home to Preston North End despite Jamie Murphy opening the scoring. Four days later, United lost 2–0 away at Gillingham with the Gills scoring two later goals. On 10 February, the Blades were 4–1 home victors over Colchester United with Jose Baxter scoring a brace, Matt Done scoring on his début and Jay McEveley scoring his first for the club; this was also the first time United had scored more than three at home since November 2012. On 13 February, Harrison McGahey joined Tranmere Rovers on a youth loan until the end of the season. On 14 February, United were 3–1 victors away at league leaders Bristol City with Matt Done scoring a brace with Jamie Murphy assisting on both occasions and scoring the third himself. After declining a new contract with United, on 17 February, Diego De Girolamo was loaned to York City for the remainder of the season. That evening, United were 2–1 victors away at Notts County with Matt Done scoring the winner making it four goals in three games since he joined. On 24 February, United were lucky to draw 2–2 at home to Coventry City as Jose Baxter was sent off for a foul early on and Coventry City took an initial 2–0 lead. United returned to winning ways in the next match on 24 February with a 2–1 away victory over Rochdale. On 26 February, Jamal Campbell-Ryce joined former club Notts County on loan for the rest of the season with the option of a recall after 28 days. On 28 February, the month ended with a 1–1 away draw at Crawley Town with Marc McNulty converting a late penalty to earn United a point.

March started with a 2–1 home defeat to Peterborough United on 3 March with the Posh scoring two very late goals to give them three points. On 6 March, Steve Davies joined United on loan from Blackpool for the rest of the season and Florent Cuvelier was loaned to Burton Albion for the remainder of the season. On 7 March, United suffered another 2–1 home defeat, this time at the hands of League One newcomers Fleetwood Town in their first ever visit to Bramall Lane. On 14 March, the Blades drew 1–1 away at Scunthorpe United with Keiron Freeman scoring his first goal for the club.

== Players ==
=== Current squad ===
As of end of season.

Note: Flags indicate national team as defined under FIFA eligibility rules; some limited exceptions apply. Players may hold more than one non-FIFA nationality.

| No. | Pos. | Nation | Player |
|---|---|---|---|
| 1 | GK | ENG | Mark Howard |
| 2 | DF | ENG | Craig Alcock |
| 3 | DF | SCO | Bob Harris |
| 4 | MF | ENG | James Wallace |
| 5 | DF | ENG | John Brayford |
| 6 | MF | ENG | Chris Basham |
| 7 | MF | SCO | Ryan Flynn |
| 8 | MF | IRL | Michael Doyle (captain) |
| 9 | FW | SCO | Jamie Murphy |
| 10 | MF | SCO | Stefan Scougall |
| 11 | MF | ENG | Jose Baxter |
| 12 | FW | SCO | Marc McNulty |
| 13 | GK | ENG | George Willis |
| 14 | FW | ENG | Matt Done |
| 15 | DF | SCO | Neill Collins |
| 16 | MF | ENG | Ben Davies |

| No. | Pos. | Nation | Player |
|---|---|---|---|
| 18 | MF | SCO | Paul Coutts |
| 19 | DF | SCO | Jay McEveley |
| 21 | FW | ENG | Michael Higdon |
| 22 | MF | ENG | Louis Reed |
| 24 | GK | SCO | Iain Turner |
| 26 | DF | WAL | Kieron Freeman |
| 27 | DF | ENG | Terry Kennedy |
| 28 | MF | IRL | Connor Dimaio |
| 29 | FW | ENG | Che Adams |
| 30 | MF | ENG | Ben Whiteman |
| 32 | FW | ENG | Steve Davies (on loan from Blackpool) |
| 33 | MF | ENG | Kieran Wallace |
| 35 | MF | SCO | Jason Holt (on loan from Heart of Midlothian) |
| 36 | MF | ENG | Dominic Calvert-Lewin |
| — | FW | WAL | Jake Eyre |
| — | MF | ENG | Callum McFadzean |

=== Out on loan ===
Note: Flags indicate national team as defined under FIFA eligibility rules; some limited exceptions apply. Players may hold more than one non-FIFA nationality.

| No. | Pos. | Nation | Player |
|---|---|---|---|
| 17 | DF | ENG | Harrison McGahey (on loan at Tranmere Rovers) |
| 20 | MF | JAM | Jamal Campbell-Ryce (on loan at Notts County) |
| 23 | FW | ITA | Diego De Girolamo (on loan at York City) |
| 25 | GK | ENG | George Long (on loan at Motherwell) |

| No. | Pos. | Nation | Player |
|---|---|---|---|
| 31 | MF | PAK | Otis Khan (on loan at Matlock Town) |
| 34 | MF | BEL | Florent Cuvelier (on loan at Burton Albion) |
| — | DF | ENG | Julian Banton (on loan at Matlock Town) |
| — | MF | NIR | Jamie McDonagh (on loan at Matlock Town) |

=== Left before the end of the season ===
Note: Flags indicate national team as defined under FIFA eligibility rules; some limited exceptions apply. Players may hold more than one non-FIFA nationality.

| No. | Pos. | Nation | Player |
|---|---|---|---|
| 5 | DF | ENG | Andy Butler |
| 14 | MF | SCO | Stephen McGinn |
| 18 | FW | ENG | Chris Porter |

| No. | Pos. | Nation | Player |
|---|---|---|---|
| — | FW | ENG | Joe Ironside |
| 26 | DF | IRL | Paddy McCarthy (on loan from Crystal Palace) |
| 32 | FW | ENG | Chris O'Grady (on loan from Brighton & Hove Albion) |

== Transfers and contracts ==
=== In ===
==== Summer ====
| Squad # | Position | Player | Transferred from | Fee | Date | Contract length | Source |
|---|---|---|---|---|---|---|---|
| 20 | MF | (Jamaica) Jamal Campbell-Ryce | (England) Notts County | Free | 19 May 2014 | 2 years | |
| 12 | FW | (Scotland) Marc McNulty | (Scotland) Livingston | Undisclosed | 19 May 2014 | 3 years | |
| 6 | MF | (England) Chris Basham | (England) Blackpool | Free | 5 June 2014 | 3 years | |
| 5 | DF | (England) Andy Butler | (England) Walsall | Free | 5 June 2014 | 2 years | |
| 16 | MF | (England) Ben Davies | (England) Derby County | Free | 9 June 2014 | 1 year | |
| 4 | MF | (England) James Wallace | (England) Tranmere Rovers | Undisclosed | 13 June 2014 | 2 years | |
| 2 | DF | (England) Craig Alcock | (England) Peterborough United | Free | 15 July 2014 | 2 years | |
| 17 | DF | (England) Harrison McGahey | (England) Blackpool | Compensation | 18 July 2014 | 2 years | |
| 21 | FW | (England) Michael Higdon | (Netherlands) N.E.C. Nijmegen | Undisclosed | 4 August 2014 | 2 years | |
| 19 | DF | (Scotland) Jay McEveley | (England) Swindon Town | Free | 15 August 2014 | 1 year | |
| 24 | GK | (Scotland) Iain Turner | (England) Barnsley | Free | 15 August 2014 | 6 Months | |

==== Winter ====
| Squad # | Position | Player | Transferred from | Fee | Date | Contract length | Source |
|---|---|---|---|---|---|---|---|
| 29 | FW | (England) Che Adams | (England) Ilkeston | Undisclosed | 14 November 2014 | 2 years | |
| 33 | MF | (England) Kieran Wallace | (England) Ilkeston | Free | 28 November 2014 | 1 years | |
| 26 | DF | (Wales) Kieron Freeman | (England) Derby County | Free | 23 January 2015 | 2.5 years | |
| 18 | MF | (Scotland) Paul Coutts | (England) Derby County | Undisclosed | 23 January 2015 | 2.5 years | |
| 5 | DF | (England) John Brayford | (Wales) Cardiff City | Undisclosed | 24 January 2015 | 3.5 years | |
| 14 | MF | (England) Matt Done | (England) Rochdale | Undisclosed | 2 February 2015 | 2.5 years | |

==== Loan in ====
| Squad # | Position | Player | Loaned from | Start | End | Source |
|---|---|---|---|---|---|---|
| 26 | DF | (Republic of Ireland) Paddy McCarthy | (England) Crystal Palace | 3 October 2014 | 2 November 2014 | |
| 26 | DF | (Republic of Ireland) Paddy McCarthy | (England) Crystal Palace | 13 November 2014 | 28 December 2014 | |
| 32 | FW | (England) Chris O'Grady | (England) Brighton & Hove Albion | 27 November 2014 | 29 December 2014 | |
| 35 | MF | (Scotland) Jason Holt | (Scotland) Heart of Midlothian | 30 January 2015 | 3 May 2015 | |
| 32 | FW | (England) Steve Davies | (England) Blackpool | 6 March 2015 | 3 May 2015 | |

=== Out ===
==== Summer ====
| Squad # | Position | Player | Transferred to | Fee | Date | Source |
|---|---|---|---|---|---|---|
| 19 | MF | (England) Febian Brandy | (England) Rotherham United | Free | 25 June 2014 | |
| 2 | DF | (England) Darryl Westlake | (Scotland) Kilmarnock | Free | 30 June 2014 | |
| 6 | DF | (England) Matt Hill | (England) Tranmere Rovers | Free | 30 June 2014 | |
| 12 | FW | (England) Shaun Miller | (England) Coventry City | Free | 30 June 2014 | |
| 20 | DF | (Republic of Ireland) Sean McGinty | (England) Rochdale | Free | 30 June 2014 | |
| 27 | MF | (England) Elliott Whitehouse | (England) Notts County | Free | 30 June 2014 | |
| 30 | DF | (Northern Ireland) Jasper Johns | | Free | 30 June 2014 | |
| — | DF | (England) Jordan Hodder | | Free | 30 June 2014 | |
| — | FW | (England) Jahmal Smith | | Free | 30 June 2014 | |
| 10 | FW | (England) Lyle Taylor | (England) Scunthorpe United | Undisclosed | 30 June 2014 | |
| 5 | DF | (England) Harry Maguire | (England) Hull City | £2.5 million | 29 July 2014 | |

==== Winter ====
| Squad # | Position | Player | Transferred to | Fee | Date | Source |
|---|---|---|---|---|---|---|
| 5 | DF | (England) Andy Butler | (England) Doncaster Rovers | Undisclosed | 6 January 2015 | |
| — | FW | (England) Joe Ironside | (England) Alfreton Town | Released | 15 January 2015 | |
| 18 | FW | (England) Chris Porter | (England) Colchester United | Released | 22 January 2015 | |
| 14 | MF | (Scotland) Stephen McGinn | (Scotland) Dundee | Released | 2 February 2015 | |

==== Loan out ====
| Squad # | Position | Player | Loaned to | Start | End | Source |
|---|---|---|---|---|---|---|
| — | MF | (England) Callum McFadzean | (England) Burton Albion | 3 July 2014 | January 2015 | |
| — | GK | (England) George Long | (England) Oxford United | 25 July 2014 | 25 November 2014 | |
| — | FW | (England) Joe Ironside | (England) Alfreton Town | 16 August 2014 | November 2014 | |
| — | DF | (England) Julian Banton | (England) Bradford Park Avenue | 22 August 2014 | 21 September 2014 | |
| 5 | DF | (England) Andy Butler | (England) Walsall | 11 September 2014 | 20 October 2014 | |
| 13 | GK | (England) George Willis | (England) Bradford Park Avenue | 11 September 2014 | 6 October 2014 | |
| 23 | MF | (Italy) Diego De Girolamo | (England) York City | 9 October 2014 | 4 November 2014 | |
| 5 | DF | (England) Andy Butler | (England) Doncaster Rovers | 23 October 2014 | 6 January 2015 | |
| — | FW | (England) Joe Ironside | (England) Hartlepool United | 22 November 2014 | 31 December 2014 | |
| 23 | MF | (Italy) Diego De Girolamo | (England) York City | 26 November 2014 | 4 January 2015 | |
| — | MF | (Republic of Ireland) CJ Hamilton | (England) Mickleover Sports | 28 November 2014 | | |
| — | DF | (England) Julian Banton | (England) Matlock Town | 16 January 2015 | | |
| 31 | MF | (Pakistan) Otis Khan | (England) Matlock Town | 16 January 20154 | | |
| 14 | MF | (Scotland) Stephen McGinn | (Scotland) Dundee | 30 January 2014 | 2 February 2015 | |
| — | MF | (Northern Ireland) Jamie McDonagh | (England) Matlock Town | 30 January 2015 | | |
| 25 | GK | (England) George Long | (Scotland) Motherwell | 2 February 2015 | 3 May 2015 | |
| 17 | DF | (England) Harrison McGahey | (England) Tranmere Rovers | 13 February 2015 | 3 May 2015 | |
| 23 | MF | (Italy) Diego De Girolamo | (England) York City | 17 February 2015 | 19 March 2015 | |
| 20 | MF | (Jamaica) Jamal Campbell-Ryce | (England) Notts County | 26 February 2015 | 3 May 2015 | |
| 34 | MF | (Belgium) Florent Cuvelier | (England) Burton Albion | 6 March 2015 | 3 May 2015 | |
| 23 | MF | (Italy) Diego De Girolamo | (England) Northampton Town | 19 March 2015 | 30 June 2015 | |
| 15 | DF | (Scotland) Neill Collins | (England) Port Vale | 26 March 2015 | 30 June 2015 | |
| 33 | MF | (England) Kieran Wallace | (England) Lincoln City | 26 March 2015 | 30 June 2015 | |

=== Contracts ===
New contracts and contract extensions.

| Player | Date | Length | Contracted until | Reference / Notes |
|---|---|---|---|---|
| (Scotland) Bob Harris | 16 May 2014 | 1 Year | Summer 2015 | |
| (England) Mark Howard | 16 May 2014 | 1 Year | Summer 2015 | |
| (England) Terry Kennedy | 16 May 2014 | 1 Year | Summer 2015 | |
| (England) Chris Porter | 9 June 2014 | 1 Year | Summer 2015 | |
| (England) Louis Reed | 12 August 2014 | 3 Year | Summer 2018 | |
| (England) Terry Kennedy | 31 January 2015 | 1 Year | Summer 2016 | |
| (Scotland) Jamie Murphy | 31 January 2015 | 2 Year | Summer 2017 | |

== Season firsts ==
=== Player début ===
Players making their first team Sheffield United début in a fully competitive match.

| Squad # | Position | Player | Date | Opponents | Ground | Notes |
|---|---|---|---|---|---|---|
| 2 | DF | (England) Craig Alcock | 9 August 2014 | Bristol City | Bramall Lane | |
| 6 | MF | (England) Chris Basham | 9 August 2014 | Bristol City | Bramall Lane | |
| 21 | FW | (England) Michael Higdon | 9 August 2014 | Bristol City | Bramall Lane | |
| 17 | DF | (England) Harrison McGahey | 9 August 2014 | Bristol City | Bramall Lane | |
| 20 | MF | (Jamaica) Jamal Campbell-Ryce | 9 August 2014 | Bristol City | Bramall Lane | Sub |
| 12 | FW | (Scotland) Marc McNulty | 9 August 2014 | Bristol City | Bramall Lane | Sub |
| 5 | DF | (England) Andy Butler | 13 August 2014 | Mansfield Town | Bramall Lane | League Cup |
| 19 | DF | (Scotland) Jay McEveley | 16 August 2014 | Coventry City | Sixfields Stadium | Sub |
| 4 | MF | (England) James Wallace | 26 August 2014 | West Ham United | Upton Park | League Cup |
| 26 | DF | (Republic of Ireland) Paddy McCarthy | 4 October 2014 | Chesterfield | Proact Stadium | |
| 24 | GK | (Scotland) Iain Turner | 7 October 2014 | Hartlepool United | Victoria Park | Football League Trophy |
| 32 | FW | (England) Chris O'Grady | 2 December 2014 | Milton Keynes Dons | Bramall Lane | |
| 33 | MF | (England) Kieran Wallace | 13 December 2014 | Fleetwood Town | Highbury Stadium | |
| 29 | FW | (England) Che Adams | 16 December 2014 | Southampton | Bramall Lane | League Cup |
| 5 | DF | (England) John Brayford | 31 January 2015 | Swindon Town | Bramall Lane | |
| 18 | MF | (Scotland) Paul Coutts | 31 January 2015 | Swindon Town | Bramall Lane | |
| 26 | DF | (Wales) Kieron Freeman | 31 January 2015 | Swindon Town | Bramall Lane | |
| 35 | MF | (Scotland) Jason Holt | 7 February 2015 | Gillingham | Priestfield Stadium | |
| 14 | FW | (England) Matt Done | 10 February 2015 | Colchester United | Bramall Lane | Sub |
| 32 | FW | (England) Steve Davies | 7 March 2015 | Fleetwood Town | Bramall Lane | |
| 36 | FW | (England) Dominic Calvert-Lewin | 25 April 2015 | Leyton Orient | Brisbane Road | Sub |

=== Début goal ===
Players scoring their first goal for Sheffield United in a competitive fixture.

| Squad # | Position | Player | Date | Opponents | Ground | Notes |
|---|---|---|---|---|---|---|
| 21 | FW | (England) Michael Higdon | 9 August 2014 | Bristol City | Bramall Lane | |
| 5 | DF | (England) Andy Butler | 13 August 2014 | Mansfield Town | Bramall Lane | League Cup |
| 12 | FW | (Scotland) Marc McNulty | 13 August 2014 | Mansfield Town | Bramall Lane | League Cup |
| 20 | MF | (Jamaica) Jamal Campbell-Ryce | 13 September 2014 | Rochdale | Bramall Lane | |
| 26 | DF | (Republic of Ireland) Paddy McCarthy | 11 October 2014 | Leyton Orient | Bramall Lane | |
| 3 | DF | (Scotland) Bob Harris | 18 October 2014 | Bradford City | Valley Parade | |
| 32 | FW | (England) Chris O'Grady | 20 December 2014 | Walsall F.C. | Bramall Lane | |
| 23 | FW | (Italy) Diego De Girolamo | 24 January 2015 | Preston North End | Deepdale | FA Cup |
| 29 | FW | (England) Che Adams | 28 January 2015 | Tottenham Hotspur | Bramall Lane | League Cup |
| 14 | FW | (England) Matt Done | 10 February 2015 | Colchester United | Bramall Lane | |
| 19 | DF | (Scotland) Jay McEveley | 10 February 2015 | Colchester United | Bramall Lane | |
| 26 | DF | (Wales) Kieron Freeman | 14 March 2015 | Scunthorpe United | Glanford Park | |
| 35 | MF | (Scotland) Jason Holt | 24 March 2015 | Scunthorpe United | Bramall Lane | |
| 32 | FW | (England) Steve Davies | 4 April 2015 | Barnsley | Oakwell | |
| 6 | MF | (England) Chris Basham | 11 May 2015 | Swindon Town | County Ground | Play-offs |

=== Competitive fixture ===
First ever meeting of the two clubs in a competitive fixture.

| Opposition | Date | Venue | Result | Score | Notes |
|---|---|---|---|---|---|
| Fleetwood Town | 13 December 2014 | Highbury Stadium | Draw | 1–1 | |

=== Stadia ===
First ever visit to a stadium for a competitive fixture

| Venue | Opposition | Date | Result | Score | Notes |
|---|---|---|---|---|---|
| Highbury Stadium | Fleetwood Town | 13 December 2014 | Draw | 1–1 | |

== Squad statistics ==
=== Appearances and goals ===
As of end of season

| No. | Pos | Nat | Player | Total | | League/Playoffs | | FA Cup | | League Cup | | FL Trophy | |
| No. | Pos | Nat | Player | Apps | Goals | Apps | Goals | Apps | Goals | Apps | Goals | Apps | Goals |
|---|---|---|---|---|---|---|---|---|---|---|---|---|---|
| 1 | GK | (England) ENG | Mark Howard | 50 | 0 | 37 | 0 | 6 | 0 | 7 | 0 | 0 | 0 |
| 2 | DF | (England) ENG | Craig Alcock | 32 | 0 | 18+7 | 0 | 3 | 0 | 3 | 0 | 1 | 0 |
| 3 | DF | (Scotland) SCO | Bob Harris | 57 | 3 | 37+5 | 3 | 5+1 | 0 | 7 | 0 | 2 | 0 |
| 4 | MF | (England) ENG | James Wallace | 13 | 0 | 7+3 | 0 | 0+1 | 0 | 1+1 | 0 | 0 | 0 |
| 5 | DF | (England) ENG | John Brayford | 23 | 1 | 23 | 1 | 0 | 0 | 0 | 0 | 0 | 0 |
| 6 | MF | (England) ENG | Chris Basham | 50 | 1 | 37+2 | 1 | 5 | 0 | 4 | 0 | 2 | 0 |
| 7 | MF | (Scotland) SCO | Ryan Flynn | 45 | 3 | 20+14 | 1 | 5 | 2 | 5 | 0 | 1 | 0 |
| 8 | MF | (Republic of Ireland) IRL | Michael Doyle | 57 | 1 | 35+9 | 1 | 5 | 0 | 6+1 | 0 | 1 | 0 |
| 9 | FW | (Scotland) SCO | Jamie Murphy | 58 | 12 | 43+2 | 11 | 4+2 | 1 | 5+1 | 0 | 0+1 | 0 |
| 10 | MF | (Scotland) SCO | Stefan Scougall | 35 | 1 | 20+6 | 1 | 4+1 | 0 | 3 | 0 | 0+1 | 0 |
| 11 | FW | (England) ENG | Jose Baxter | 48 | 13 | 28+6 | 10 | 5+1 | 2 | 3+3 | 0 | 1+1 | 1 |
| 12 | FW | (Scotland) SCO | Marc McNulty | 43 | 13 | 12+20 | 9 | 2+2 | 2 | 6 | 2 | 0+1 | 0 |
| 13 | GK | (England) ENG | George Willis | 0 | 0 | 0 | 0 | 0 | 0 | 0 | 0 | 0 | 0 |
| 14 | FW | (England) ENG | Matt Done | 17 | 8 | 13+4 | 8 | 0 | 0 | 0 | 0 | 0 | 0 |
| 15 | DF | (Scotland) SCO | Neill Collins | 12 | 1 | 8 | 1 | 0 | 0 | 3 | 0 | 0+1 | 0 |
| 16 | MF | (England) ENG | Ben Davies | 19 | 4 | 11+3 | 4 | 1 | 0 | 3 | 0 | 1 | 0 |
| 17 | DF | (England) ENG | Harrison McGahey | 22 | 0 | 11+4 | 0 | 1 | 0 | 3+1 | 0 | 2 | 0 |
| 18 | MF | (Scotland) SCO | Paul Coutts | 22 | 0 | 21+1 | 0 | 0 | 0 | 0 | 0 | 0 | 0 |
| 19 | DF | (Scotland) SCO | Jay McEveley | 46 | 1 | 33+3 | 1 | 5 | 0 | 4+1 | 0 | 0 | 0 |
| 20 | MF | (Jamaica) JAM | Jamal Campbell-Ryce | 32 | 7 | 14+5 | 4 | 5 | 2 | 4+2 | 0 | 1+1 | 1 |
| 21 | FW | (England) ENG | Michael Higdon | 20 | 5 | 9+4 | 2 | 2+1 | 0 | 1+3 | 3 | 0 | 0 |
| 22 | MF | (England) ENG | Louis Reed | 32 | 0 | 10+9 | 0 | 4+2 | 0 | 4+1 | 0 | 2 | 0 |
| 23 | FW | (Italy) ITA | Diego De Girolamo | 6 | 1 | 0 | 0 | 1+3 | 1 | 0 | 0 | 2 | 0 |
| 24 | GK | (Scotland) SCO | Iain Turner | 13 | 0 | 11 | 0 | 0 | 0 | 0 | 0 | 2 | 0 |
| 25 | GK | (England) ENG | George Long | 0 | 0 | 0 | 0 | 0 | 0 | 0 | 0 | 0 | 0 |
| 26 | DF | (Wales) WAL | Kieron Freeman | 21 | 2 | 15+6 | 2 | 0 | 0 | 0 | 0 | 0 | 0 |
| 27 | DF | (England) ENG | Terry Kennedy | 13 | 0 | 10+1 | 0 | 2 | 0 | 0 | 0 | 0 | 0 |
| 28 | MF | (Republic of Ireland) IRL | Connor Dimaio | 1 | 0 | 0 | 0 | 1 | 0 | 0 | 0 | 0 | 0 |
| 29 | FW | (England) ENG | Che Adams | 13 | 3 | 5+6 | 1 | 0 | 0 | 0+2 | 2 | 0 | 0 |
| 30 | MF | (England) ENG | Ben Whiteman | 1 | 0 | 0 | 0 | 0+1 | 0 | 0 | 0 | 0 | 0 |
| 31 | MF | (Pakistan) PAK | Otis Khan | 0 | 0 | 0 | 0 | 0 | 0 | 0 | 0 | 0 | 0 |
| 32 | FW | (England) ENG | Steve Davies | 15 | 3 | 11+4 | 3 | 0 | 0 | 0 | 0 | 0 | 0 |
| 33 | MF | (England) ENG | Kieran Wallace | 6 | 0 | 2+2 | 0 | 0 | 0 | 0+2 | 0 | 0 | 0 |
| 34 | MF | (Belgium) BEL | Florent Cuvelier | 5 | 0 | 1+2 | 0 | 0+1 | 0 | 1 | 0 | 0 | 0 |
| 35 | MF | (Scotland) SCO | Jason Holt | 17 | 5 | 12+5 | 5 | 0 | 0 | 0 | 0 | 0 | 0 |
| 36 | FW | (England) ENG | Dominic Calvert-Lewin | 2 | 0 | 0+2 | 0 | 0 | 0 | 0 | 0 | 0 | 0 |
| — | MF | (England) ENG | Callum McFadzean | 0 | 0 | 0 | 0 | 0 | 0 | 0 | 0 | 0 | 0 |
Players who left before the end of the season:
| 5 | DF | (England) ENG | Andy Butler | 1 | 1 | 0 | 0 | 0 | 0 | 1 | 1 | 0 | 0 |
| 14 | MF | (Scotland) SCO | Stephen McGinn | 4 | 0 | 0 | 0 | 0 | 0 | 2 | 0 | 2 | 0 |
| 18 | FW | (England) ENG | Chris Porter | 5 | 0 | 0+1 | 0 | 0 | 0 | 1+1 | 0 | 2 | 0 |
| 26 | DF | (Republic of Ireland) IRL | Paddy McCarthy | 11 | 1 | 10+1 | 1 | 0 | 0 | 0 | 0 | 0 | 0 |
| 32 | FW | (England) ENG | Chris O'Grady | 4 | 1 | 4 | 1 | 0 | 0 | 0 | 0 | 0 | 0 |
| — | FW | (England) ENG | Joe Ironside | 0 | 0 | 0 | 0 | 0 | 0 | 0 | 0 | 0 | 0 |

=== Top scorers ===
As of end of season

| Place | Number | Nation | Position | Name | League/Playoffs | FA Cup | League Cup | FL Trophy | Total |
|---|---|---|---|---|---|---|---|---|---|
| 1 | 11 | (England) | FW | Jose Baxter | 10 | 2 | 0 | 1 | 13 |
| 1 | 12 | (Scotland) | FW | Marc McNulty | 9 | 2 | 2 | 0 | 13 |
| 2 | 9 | (Scotland) | FW | Jamie Murphy | 11 | 1 | 0 | 0 | 12 |
| 3 | 14 | (England) | FW | Matt Done | 8 | 0 | 0 | 0 | 8 |
| 4 | 20 | (Jamaica) | MF | Jamal Campbell-Ryce | 4 | 2 | 0 | 1 | 7 |
| 5 | 21 | (England) | FW | Michael Higdon | 2 | 0 | 3 | 0 | 5 |
| 5 | 35 | (Scotland) | MF | Jason Holt | 5 | 0 | 0 | 0 | 5 |
| 6 | 16 | (England) | MF | Ben Davies | 4 | 0 | 0 | 0 | 4 |
| 7 | 29 | (England) | FW | Che Adams | 1 | 0 | 2 | 0 | 3 |
| 7 | 32 | (England) | FW | Steve Davies | 3 | 0 | 0 | 0 | 3 |
| 7 | 7 | (Scotland) | MF | Ryan Flynn | 1 | 2 | 0 | 0 | 3 |
| 7 | 3 | (Scotland) | DF | Bob Harris | 3 | 0 | 0 | 0 | 3 |
| 8 | 26 | (Wales) | DF | Kieron Freeman | 2 | 0 | 0 | 0 | 2 |
| 9 | 6 | (England) | MF | Chris Basham | 1 | 0 | 0 | 0 | 1 |
| 9 | 5 | (England) | DF | John Brayford | 1 | 0 | 0 | 0 | 1 |
| 9 | 5 | (England) | DF | Andy Butler | 0 | 0 | 1 | 0 | 1 |
| 9 | 15 | (Scotland) | DF | Neill Collins | 1 | 0 | 0 | 0 | 1 |
| 9 | 23 | (Italy) | MF | Diego De Girolamo | 0 | 1 | 0 | 0 | 1 |
| 9 | 8 | (Republic of Ireland) | MF | Michael Doyle | 1 | 0 | 0 | 0 | 1 |
| 9 | 26 | (Republic of Ireland) | DF | Paddy McCarthy | 1 | 0 | 0 | 0 | 1 |
| 9 | 19 | (Scotland) | DF | Jay McEveley | 1 | 0 | 0 | 0 | 1 |
| 9 | 32 | (England) | FW | Chris O'Grady | 1 | 0 | 0 | 0 | 1 |
| 9 | 10 | (Scotland) | MF | Stefan Scougall | 1 | 0 | 0 | 0 | 1 |
| Total | | | | | 71 | 10 | 8 | 2 | 91 |

United also benefited from one own goal in the Football League Cup, and one own goal in the playoffs.

=== Clean sheets ===
As of end of season

| Rank | Pos | No. | Nat | Name | League One | FA Cup | League Cup | FLT | Total |
|---|---|---|---|---|---|---|---|---|---|
| 1 | GK | 1 | (England) | Mark Howard | 8 | 4 | 2 | 0 | 14 |
| 2 | GK | 24 | (Scotland) | Iain Turner | 2 | 0 | 0 | 0 | 2 |
| Total | | | | | 10 | 4 | 2 | 0 | 16 |

=== Penalties ===
As of end of season

Penalties Awarded
| Date | Penalty Taker | Goalkeeper | Opponent | Scored? | Competition |
|---|---|---|---|---|---|
| 16 Sep 2014 | (England) Davies | (England) Walker | Colchester United | ✓ | League One |
| 25 Oct 2014 | (England) Baxter | (England) Garratt | Crewe Alexandra | ✗ | League One |
| 7 Dec 2014 | (England) Baxter | (England) McCormick | Plymouth Argyle | ✓ | FA Cup |
| 7 Dec 2014 | (England) Baxter | (England) McCormick | Plymouth Argyle | ✓ | FA Cup |
| 10 Feb 2015 | (England) Baxter | (England) Walker | Colchester United | ✓ | League One |
| 28 Feb 2015 | (Scotland) McNulty | (Wales) Price | Crawley Town | ✓ | League One |
| 21 Mar 2015 | (England) Baxter | (England) Neal | Port Vale | ✓ | League One |
| 24 Mar 2015 | (England) Baxter | (England) Daniels | Scunthorpe United | ✓ | League One |
| 24 Mar 2015 | (England) Baxter | (England) Daniels | Scunthorpe United | ✓ | League One |
| 7 Apr 2015 | (England) Baxter | (England) Bywater | Doncaster Rovers | ✓ | League One |

Penalties Conceded
| Date | Penalty Taker | Goalkeeper | Opponent | Scored? | Competition |
|---|---|---|---|---|---|
| 28 Oct 2014 | (England) Afobe | (England) Howard | Milton Keynes Dons | ✓ | League Cup |
| 15 Nov 2014 | (England) Forrester | (England) Howard | Doncaster Rovers | ✗ | League One |
| 7 Dec 2014 | (England) Reid | (England) Howard | Plymouth Argyle | ✗ | FA Cup |
| 26 Dec 2014 | (France) N'Guessan | (England) Howard | Port Vale | ✓ | League One |
| 21 Jan 2015 | (England) Townsend | (England) Howard | Tottenham Hotspur | ✓ | League Cup |
| 3 Feb 2015 | (England) Gallagher | (England) Howard | Preston North End | ✓ | FA Cup |
| 7 May 2015 | (England) Gladwin | (England) Howard | Swindon Town | ✗ | Playoffs |
| 11 May 2015 | (England) Smith | (England) Howard | Swindon Town | ✓ | Playoffs |

=== Disciplinary record ===
As of end of season

| Number | Nation | Position | Name | League/Playoffs | | FA Cup | | League Cup | | FL Trophy | | Total | |
| Number | Nation | Position | Name | Yellow card | Red card | Yellow card | Red card | Yellow card | Red card | Yellow card | Red card | Yellow card | Red card |
|---|---|---|---|---|---|---|---|---|---|---|---|---|---|
| 6 | (England) | MF | Chris Basham | 9 | 1 | 0 | 0 | 2 | 0 | 0 | 0 | 11 | 1 |
| 3 | (Scotland) | DF | Bob Harris | 7 | 0 | 0 | 0 | 1 | 0 | 2 | 0 | 10 | 0 |
| 11 | (England) | FW | Jose Baxter | 4 | 1 | 1 | 0 | 1 | 0 | 0 | 0 | 6 | 1 |
| 8 | (Republic of Ireland) | MF | Michael Doyle | 6 | 0 | 0 | 0 | 3 | 0 | 0 | 0 | 9 | 0 |
| 19 | (Scotland) | DF | Jay McEveley | 5 | 0 | 0 | 0 | 1 | 0 | 0 | 0 | 6 | 0 |
| 18 | (Scotland) | MF | Paul Coutts | 4 | 0 | 0 | 0 | 0 | 0 | 0 | 0 | 4 | 0 |
| 21 | (England) | FW | Michael Higdon | 1 | 1 | 0 | 0 | 0 | 0 | 0 | 0 | 1 | 1 |
| 2 | (England) | DF | Craig Alcock | 2 | 0 | 0 | 0 | 1 | 0 | 0 | 0 | 3 | 0 |
| 20 | (Jamaica) | MF | Jamal Campbell-Ryce | 3 | 0 | 0 | 0 | 0 | 0 | 0 | 0 | 3 | 0 |
| 32 | (England) | FW | Steve Davies | 3 | 0 | 0 | 0 | 0 | 0 | 0 | 0 | 3 | 0 |
| 7 | (Scotland) | MF | Ryan Flynn | 1 | 0 | 0 | 0 | 2 | 0 | 0 | 0 | 3 | 0 |
| 35 | (Scotland) | MF | Jason Holt | 3 | 0 | 0 | 0 | 0 | 0 | 0 | 0 | 3 | 0 |
| 27 | (England) | DF | Terry Kennedy | 2 | 0 | 1 | 0 | 0 | 0 | 0 | 0 | 3 | 0 |
| 26 | (Republic of Ireland) | DF | Paddy McCarthy | 0 | 1 | 0 | 0 | 0 | 0 | 0 | 0 | 0 | 1 |
| 12 | (Scotland) | FW | Marc McNulty | 1 | 0 | 2 | 0 | 0 | 0 | 0 | 0 | 3 | 0 |
| 9 | (Scotland) | FW | Jamie Murphy | 3 | 0 | 0 | 0 | 0 | 0 | 0 | 0 | 3 | 0 |
| 22 | (England) | MF | Louis Reed | 1 | 0 | 2 | 0 | 0 | 0 | 0 | 0 | 3 | 0 |
| 10 | (Scotland) | MF | Stefan Scougall | 3 | 0 | 0 | 0 | 0 | 0 | 0 | 0 | 3 | 0 |
| 5 | (England) | DF | John Brayford | 2 | 0 | 0 | 0 | 0 | 0 | 0 | 0 | 2 | 0 |
| 16 | (England) | MF | Ben Davies | 2 | 0 | 0 | 0 | 0 | 0 | 0 | 0 | 2 | 0 |
| 1 | (England) | GK | Mark Howard | 2 | 0 | 0 | 0 | 0 | 0 | 0 | 0 | 2 | 0 |
| 29 | (England) | FW | Che Adams | 1 | 0 | 0 | 0 | 0 | 0 | 0 | 0 | 1 | 0 |
| 36 | (England) | FW | Dominic Calvert-Lewin | 1 | 0 | 0 | 0 | 0 | 0 | 0 | 0 | 1 | 0 |
| 34 | (Belgium) | MF | Florent Cuvelier | 0 | 0 | 0 | 0 | 1 | 0 | 0 | 0 | 1 | 0 |
| 26 | (Wales) | DF | Kieron Freeman | 1 | 0 | 0 | 0 | 0 | 0 | 0 | 0 | 1 | 0 |
| 17 | (England) | DF | Harrison McGahey | 0 | 0 | 0 | 0 | 0 | 0 | 1 | 0 | 1 | 0 |
| 4 | (England) | MF | James Wallace | 1 | 0 | 0 | 0 | 0 | 0 | 0 | 0 | 1 | 0 |
| Total | | | | 68 | 4 | 6 | 0 | 12 | 0 | 3 | 0 | 89 | 4 |

== International Call-ups ==
| No. | P | Name | Squad | Competition | Opposition | Date | Cap | Goals | Notes |
|---|---|---|---|---|---|---|---|---|---|
| — | MF | Jamie McDonagh | Northern Ireland U19 | 2014 Milk Cup | China U19 | | | | |
| — | MF | Jamie McDonagh | Northern Ireland U19 | 2014 Milk Cup | Mexico U19 | | | | |
| — | MF | Jamie McDonagh | Northern Ireland U19 | 2014 Milk Cup | Canada U19 | | | | |
| — | MF | Shea Gordon | Northern Ireland U17 | 2014 Syrenka Cup | Belgium U17 | 26 August 2014 | Y | 0 | |
| — | MF | Shea Gordon | Northern Ireland U17 | 2014 Syrenka Cup | Poland U17 | 28 August 2014 | Y | 0 | |
| — | MF | Jamie McDonagh | Northern Ireland U19 | Friendly | Iceland U19 | 3 September 2014 | Y | 0 | |
| — | MF | Jamie McDonagh | Northern Ireland U19 | Friendly | Iceland U19 | 5 September 2014 | Y | 2 | |
| — | DF | Ioan Evans | Wales U19 | | Montenegro U19 | 4 September 2014 | Y | 0 | |
| — | MF | Connor Dimaio | (Republic of Ireland) Ireland U19 | Friendly | Netherlands U19 | 8 September 2014 | | | |
| — | MF | Joel Coustrain | (Republic of Ireland) Ireland U19 | Friendly | Netherlands U19 | 8 September 2014 | | | |
| 23 | FW | Diego De Girolamo | Italy U20 | | Germany U20 | | | | |
| 23 | FW | Diego De Girolamo | Italy U20 | | Poland U20 | | | | |
| 23 | FW | Diego De Girolamo | Italy U20 | | Switzerland U20 | | | | |
| 31 | MF | Otis Khan | Pakistan | Friendly | Afghanistan | 6 February 2015 | N | 0 | |
| 31 | MF | Otis Khan | Pakistan | 2018 World Cup qualification – AFC | Yemen | 12 March 2015 | | | |
| 31 | MF | Otis Khan | Pakistan | 2018 World Cup qualification – AFC | Yemen | 17 March 2015 | | | |

== League One table ==
| Pos | Team | Pld | W | D | L | GF | GA | GD | Pts | Promotion, qualification or relegation |
|---|---|---|---|---|---|---|---|---|---|---|
| 3 | Preston North End (O, P) | 46 | 25 | 14 | 7 | 79 | 40 | +39 | 89 | Qualification for League One play-offs (Note: Four teams play for one spot and promotion to Football League Championship.) |
| 4 | Swindon Town | 46 | 23 | 10 | 13 | 76 | 57 | +19 | 79 | Qualification for League One play-offs |
| 5 | Sheffield United | 46 | 19 | 14 | 13 | 66 | 53 | +13 | 71 | Qualification for League One play-offs |
| 6 | Chesterfield | 46 | 19 | 12 | 15 | 68 | 55 | +13 | 69 | Qualification for League One play-offs |
| 7 | Bradford City | 46 | 17 | 14 | 15 | 55 | 55 | 0 | 65 | |

Updated to match(es) played on 3 May 2015. Source: BBC Sport
Rules for classification: 1) Points; 2) Goal difference; 3) Number of goals scored
(O) Play-off winners; (P) Promoted

== Matches ==
=== Key ===
Win Draw Loss

=== League One ===
| 9 August 2014 | Sheffield United | 1–2 | Bristol City | Bramall Lane |
| 12:15 | Higdon 32' | (Report) | Wilbraham 20'; Elliott 72' | Attendance: 19,889; Referee: Paul Tierney |

| 16 August 2014 | Coventry City | 1–0 | Sheffield United | Sixfields Stadium, Northampton |
| 15:00 | Harris 78' (o.g.) | (Report) | | Attendance: 2,279; Referee: Graham Scott |

| 19 August 2014 | Peterborough United | 1–2 | Sheffield United | London Road Stadium |
| 19:30 | Brisley 34' | (Report) | Baxter 25'; Davies 84' | Attendance: 6,578; Referee: Scott Duncan |

| 23 August 2014 | Sheffield United | 1–0 | Crawley Town | Bramall Lane |
| 15:00 | Baxter 48' | (Report) | | Attendance: 18,178; Referee: Andy D'Urso |

| 30 August 2014 | Preston North End | 1–1 | Sheffield United | Deepdale |
| 15:00 | Little 11' | (Report) | Baxter 41' | Attendance: 11,058; Referee: Seb Stockbridge |

| 13 September 2014 | Sheffield United | 1–0 | Rochdale | Bramall Lane |
| 15:00 | Campbell-Ryce 84' | (Report) | | Attendance: 19,122; Referee: Gary Sutton |

| 16 September 2014 | Colchester United | 2–3 | Sheffield United | Colchester Community Stadium |
| 19:45 | Moncur 31'; Sears 77' | (Report) | Davies 83' (pen.), 88'; Flynn 85' | Attendance: 3,084; Referee: Oliver Langford |

| 20 September 2014 | Swindon Town | 5–2 | Sheffield United | County Ground |
| 15:00 | Smith 13', 55'; Obika 58'; Williams 76'; Thompson 86' | (Report) | McNulty 66'; Davies 72' | Attendance: 7,536; Referee: Gavin Ward |

| 27 September 2014 | Sheffield United | 2–1 | Gillingham | Bramall Lane |
| 15:00 | Higdon 87'; Murphy 90' | (Report) | Norris 84' | Attendance: 18,487; Referee: Kevin Wright |

| 4 October 2014 | Chesterfield | 3–2 | Sheffield United | Proact Stadium |
| 13:00 | Ryan 26'; Roberts 45'; E. Doyle 73'; Lee (red card) 41' | (Report) | McNulty 81'; Collins 90'; Higdon (red card) 30' | Attendance: 9,723; Referee: Mark Brown |

| 11 October 2014 | Sheffield United | 2–2 | Leyton Orient | Bramall Lane |
| 15:00 | McCarthy 90'; McNulty 90+1' | (Report) | Simpson 38'; Vincelot 90+9'; McAnuff (yellow card) 75' (yellow-red card) | Attendance: 19,179; Referee: Andy Haines |

| 18 October 2014 | Bradford City | 0–2 | Sheffield United | Valley Parade |
| 17:15 | Darby (yellow card) 46' (yellow-red card) | (Report) | Harris 66'; McNulty 83' | Attendance: 14,784; Referee: Simon Hooper |

| 21 October 2014 | Sheffield United | 2–0 | Yeovil Town | Bramall Lane |
| 19:45 | McNulty 14'; Murphy 67' | (Report) | | Attendance: 19,353; Referee: David Webb |

| 25 October 2014 | Crewe Alexandra | 0–1 | Sheffield United | Gresty Road |
| 15:00 | Ray (red card) 87' | (Report) | Scougall 69' | Attendance: 5,699; Referee: Peter Bankes |

| 1 November 2014 | Sheffield United | 0–1 | Barnsley | Bramall Lane |
| 15:00 | | (Report) | Winnall 56' | Attendance: 24,495; Referee: Scott Mathieson |

| 15 November 2014 | Doncaster Rovers | 0–1 | Sheffield United | Keepmoat Stadium |
| 15:00 | | (Report) | McCarthy (red card) 62'; Murphy 64' | Attendance: 11,037; Referee: Keith Hill |

| 22 November 2014 | Sheffield United | 1–1 | Oldham Athletic | Bramall Lane |
| 15:00 | Campbell-Ryce 63' | (Report) | Forte 16'; Ibehre (yellow card) 87' (yellow-red card) | Attendance: 19,767; Referee: Andy Davies |

| 28 November 2014 | Sheffield United | 1–1 | Notts County | Bramall Lane |
| 19:45 | Murphy 76' | (Report) | Edwards 31' | Attendance: 19,385; Referee: Bobby Madley |

| 2 December 2014 | Sheffield United | 0–1 | Milton Keynes Dons | Bramall Lane |
| 19:45 | | (Report) | Alli 87' | Attendance: 17,030; Referee: Lee Collins |

| 13 December 2014 | Fleetwood Town | 1–1 | Sheffield United | Highbury Stadium |
| 15:00 | Sarcevic 53' | (Report) | Harris 8' | Attendance: 4,269; Referee: Andre Marriner |

| 20 December 2014 | Sheffield United | 1–1 | Walsall | Bramall Lane |
| 15:00 | O'Grady 56' | (Report) | Bradshaw 59' | Attendance: 20,209; Referee: Graham Horwood |

| 26 December 2014 | Port Vale | 2–1 | Sheffield United | Vale Park |
| 15:00 | Williamson 16'; N'Guessan (pen.), 79' | (Report) | Basham (red card) 44'; Campbell-Ryce 55' | Attendance: 8,524; Referee: Stuart Attwell |

| 10 January 2015 | Sheffield United | 2–1 | Preston North End | Bramall Lane |
| 15:00 | McNulty 52'; Campbell-Ryce 70' | (Report) | Brownhill 90+2' | Attendance: 19,902; Referee: Pat Miller |

| 17 January 2015 | Milton Keynes Dons | 1–0 | Sheffield United | Stadium mk |
| 15:00 | Baker 67' | (Report) | | Attendance: 9,633; Referee: Lee Mason |

| 31 January 2015 | Sheffield United | 2–0 | Swindon Town | Bramall Lane |
| 15:00 | Murphy 73', 90+2' | (Report) | | Attendance: 19,490; Referee: David Coote |

| 7 February 2015 | Gillingham | 2–0 | Sheffield United | Priestfield Stadium |
| 15:00 | McGlashan 86'; McDonald 90+4' | (Report) | | Attendance: 5,704; Referee: Iain Williamson |

| 10 February 2015 | Sheffield United | 4–1 | Colchester United | Bramall Lane |
| 19:45 | Baxter 8' (pen.), 80'; Done 37'; McEveley 59' | (Report) | Szmodics 70' | Attendance: 17,162; Referee: Chris Sarginson |

| 14 February 2015 | Bristol City | 1–3 | Sheffield United | Ashton Gate Stadium |
| 15:00 | Smith 41' | (Report) | Done 54', 77'; Murphy 82' | Attendance: 11,767; Referee: Graham Salisbury |

| 17 February 2015 | Notts County | 1–2 | Sheffield United | Meadow Lane |
| 19:45 | Noble 35' | (Report) | Murphy 16'; Done 75' | Attendance: 6,893; Referee: Darren Bond |

| 21 February 2015 | Sheffield United | 2–2 | Coventry City | Bramall Lane |
| 15:00 | Baxter (red card) 19'; Doyle 78'; Murphy 80' | (Report) | Samuel 33', 47' | Attendance: 20,314; Referee: Darren Drysdale |

| 24 February 2015 | Rochdale | 1–2 | Sheffield United | Spotland Stadium |
| 19:45 | O'Connell 74' | (Report) | McNulty 21'; Brayford 61' | Attendance: 3,574; Referee: Tony Harrington |

| 28 February 2015 | Crawley Town | 1–1 | Sheffield United | Broadfield Stadium |
| 15:00 | Wood 63' | (Report) | McNulty (pen.), 81' | Attendance: 3,320; Referee: Charles Breakspear |

| 3 March 2015 | Sheffield United | 1–2 | Peterborough United | Bramall Lane |
| 19:30 | Done 65' | (Report) | Payne 88'; Washington 90' | Attendance: 18,604; Referee: Oliver Langford |

| 7 March 2015 | Sheffield United | 1–2 | Fleetwood Town | Bramall Lane |
| 15:00 | Done 39' | (Report) | Morris 25'; Haughton 35' | Attendance: 18,668; Referee: Darren Deadman |

| 14 March 2015 | Scunthorpe United | 1–1 | Sheffield United | Glanford Park |
| 15:00 | Bishop 37' | (Report) | Freeman 45' | Attendance: 5,550; Referee: Darren Handley |

| 17 March 2015 | Walsall | 1–1 | Sheffield United | Banks's Stadium |
| 19:45 | Hiwula (yellow card) 45'; Grimes 71'; Bakayoko (yellow card) 88' | (Report) | Baxter 8'; Doyle (yellow card) 45' | Attendance: 3,950; Referee: Rob Lewis |

| 21 March 2015 | Sheffield United | 1–0 | Port Vale | Bramall Lane |
| 15:00 | Baxter 29' (pen.); Coutts (yellow card) 37'; Basham (yellow card) 44'; Davies (yellow card) 87' | Report | Brown (yellow card) 17' (yellow-red card); McGivern (yellow card) 82'; Veseli (yellow card) 87' | Attendance: 18,729; Referee: (England) Jeremy Simpson |

| 24 March 2015 | Sheffield United | 4–0 | Scunthorpe United | Bramall Lane |
| 19:45 | Freeman (yellow card) 10'; Holt 14'; Baxter 40' (pen.) 85' (pen.); Murphy 81' | Report | Townsend (yellow card) 25'; Lundstram (yellow card) 37'; Llera (yellow card) 83' (yellow-red card) | Attendance: 19,442; Referee: (England) Mark Heywood |

| 28 March 2015 | Sheffield United | 1–2 | Crewe Alexandra | Bramall Lane |
| 15:00 | Davies (yellow card) 54'; Holt 55'; Davies (yellow card) 89' | Report | Dalla Valle 12'; Tate (yellow card) 45'; Atkinson (yellow card) 67'; Colclough 90' | Attendance: 19,672; Referee: (England) James Adcock |

| 4 April 2015 | Barnsley | 0–2 | Sheffield United | Oakwell |
| 12:15 | Stewart (yellow card) 67' | Report | Davies 42'; Brayford (yellow card) 66'; Holt 71' (yellow card) 71' | Attendance: 17,532; Referee: (England) Andy Madley |

| 7 April 2015 | Sheffield United | 3–2 | Doncaster Rovers | Bramall Lane |
| 19:45 | Baxter 29' (pen.); Done 52'; Davies 71' | Report | Bennett 17' 59'; Wellens (yellow card) 45' | Attendance: 20,487; Referee: (England) Scott Duncan |

| 11 April 2015 | Oldham Athletic | 2–2 | Sheffield United | Boundary Park |
| 15:00 | Poleon 22' 43'; Mills (yellow card) 39' | Report | Reed (yellow card) 33'; Holt (yellow card) 45+4' (goal) 56'; Murphy 73' | Attendance: 5,072; Referee: (England) Richard Clark |

| 14 April 2015 | Yeovil Town | 1–0 | Sheffield United | Huish Park |
| 19:45 | Arthurworrey 67'; Sheehan (yellow card) 90+3' | Report | Murphy (yellow card) 76' | Attendance: 3,841; Referee: (England) Tim Robinson |

| 18 April 2015 | Sheffield United | 1–1 | Bradford City | Bramall Lane |
| 15:00 BST | Doyle (yellow card) 42'; Holt 57' | Report | McMahon (yellow card) 65'; Clarke 83'; McArdle (yellow card) 90' (yellow-red card) | Attendance: 21,879; Referee: Graham Scott |

| 25 April 2015 | Leyton Orient | 1–1 | Sheffield United | Brisbane Road |
| 15:00 BST | Batt (yellow card) 22'; Baudry (yellow card) 69' (goal) 71'; Cuthbert (yellow card) 90' | Report | Coutts (yellow card) 67'; Baxter (yellow card) 70'; Harris 77' (yellow card) 86'; Calvert-Lewin (yellow card) 82' | Attendance: 7,249; Referee: Seb Stockbridge |

| 3 May 2015 | Sheffield United | 1–1 | Chesterfield | Bramall Lane |
| 12:15 BST | McNulty 34'; Harris (yellow card) 58' | Report | Evatt 51'; Jones (yellow card) 70'; Roberts (yellow card) 90+4' | Attendance: 26,078; Referee: Kevin Wright |

=== League One play-offs ===
| 7 May 2015 Semi-Final First Leg | Sheffield United | 1–2 | Swindon Town | Bramall Lane |
| 19:45 BST | Freeman 19'; Harris (yellow card) 31'; Davies (yellow card) 38' | Report | Ricketts 50' (yellow card) 65'; Byrne 90'; Kasim (yellow card) 77' | Attendance: 20,890; Referee: Darren Bond |

| 11 May 2015 Semi-Final Second Leg | Swindon Town | 5–5 (7–6 agg.) | Sheffield United | County Ground |
| 19:45 BST | Gladwin 4' 10' (yellow card) 90+1'; Smith 18' 59' (pen.); Rodgers (yellow card) 78'; Obika 84' (yellow card) 85'; Kasim (yellow card) 90+6'; Byrne (yellow card) 90+9' | Report | Thompson 19' (o.g.); Basham 38'; McEveley (yellow card) 45'; Howard (yellow card) 58'; S. Davies 65'; Coutts (yellow card) 67'; Alcock (yellow card) 81'; Done 88'; Adams 90' | Attendance: 13,065; Referee: Keith Hill |

=== FA Cup ===
| 7 November 2014 Round One | Crewe Alexandra | 0–0 | Sheffield United | Gresty Road |
| 15:00 | | (Report) | | Attendance: 3,222; Referee: Mick Russell |

| 18 November 2014 Round One Replay | Sheffield United | 2–0 | Crewe Alexandra | Bramall Lane |
| 19:45 | Flynn 19', 77' | (Report) | | Attendance: 5,987; Referee: Geoff Eltringham |

| 6 December 2014 Round Two | Sheffield United | 3–0 | Plymouth Argyle | Bramall Lane |
| 15:00 | Baxter 55' (pen.), 62' (pen.); McNulty 90' | (Report) | | Attendance: 7,348; Referee: Gary Sutton |

| 4 January 2015 Round Three | Queens Park Rangers | 0–3 | Sheffield United | Loftus Road |
| 13:00 | | (Report) | McNulty 36'; Campbell-Ryce 49', 90+4' | Attendance: 12,972; Referee: Mark Clattenburg |

| 24 January 2015 Round Four | Preston North End | 1–1 | Sheffield United | Deepdale |
| 15:00 | Gallagher 19' | (Report) | De Girolamo 68' | Attendance: 10,770; Referee: Keith Stroud |

| 3 February 2015 Round Four Replay | Sheffield United | 1–3 | Preston North End | Bramall Lane |
| 19:45 | Murphy 38' | (Report) | Gallagher 63', 73' (pen.); Huntington 69' | Attendance: 13,161; Referee: Lee Probert |

=== League Cup ===
| 13 August 2014 Round One | Sheffield United | 2–1 | Mansfield Town | Bramall Lane |
| 19:45 | Butler 53'; McNulty 86' | (Report) | Fisher 57' | Attendance: 7,929; Referee: Geoff Eltringham |

| 26 August 2014 Round Two | West Ham United | 1–1 (a.e.t.) (4–5 p) | Sheffield United | Upton Park |
| 19:45 | Sakho 40' | (Report) | Reid 58' (o.g.) | Attendance: 28,930; Referee: James Linington |
| | Penalties |
| | Noble (penalty scored); Downing (penalty scored); Zárate (penalty scored); Poyet (penalty scored); Valencia (penalty missed) | | (penalty scored) Davies; (penalty scored) Collins; (penalty scored) McNulty; (penalty scored) McEveley; (penalty scored) Doyle |

| 23 September 2014 Round Three | Leyton Orient | 0–1 | Sheffield United | Matchroom Stadium |
| 19:45 | | Report | Higdon 3' | Attendance: 3,223; Referee: James Adcock |

| 28 October 2014 Round Four | Milton Keynes Dons | 1–2 | Sheffield United | Stadium mk |
| 19:45 | Afobe 67' (pen.) | (Report) | Higdon 86', 90+2' | Attendance: 8,520; Referee: Roger East |

| 16 December 2014 Round Five | Sheffield United | 1–0 | Southampton | Bramall Lane |
| 19:45 | McNulty 63' | (Report) | Gardoș (red card) 90' | Attendance: 21,906; Referee: Chris Foy |

| 21 January 2015 Semi-finals; First leg | Tottenham Hotspur | 1–0 | Sheffield United | White Hart Lane |
| 19:45 | Townsend 74' (pen.) | (Report) | | Attendance: 35,323; Referee: Neil Swarbrick |

| 28 January 2015 Semi-finals; Second leg | Sheffield United | 2–2 (2–3 agg.) | Tottenham Hotspur | Bramall Lane |
| 19:45 | Adams 77', 79' | (Report) | Eriksen 28', 88' | Attendance: 30,236; Referee: Mike Dean |

=== Football League Trophy ===
| 7 October 2014 Round Two | Hartlepool United | 1–2 | Sheffield United | Victoria Park |
| 19:45 | Duckworth 50' | (Report) | Baxter 30'; Campbell-Ryce 82' | Attendance: 1,856; Referee: Carl Boyeson |

| 12 November 2014 Round Three | Walsall | 1–0 | Sheffield United | Bescot Stadium |
| 19:45 | Sawyers 55' | (Report) | | Attendance: 2,127; Referee: David Coote |

=== Pre-Season and friendlies ===
| 19 July 2014 | Burton Albion | 4–0 | Sheffield United | Pirelli Stadium |
| 15:00 | MacDonald 5'; Akins 12'; McFadzean 43'; Cutajar 84' | (Report) | | Attendance: 2,124 |

| 22 July 2014 | Northampton Town | 1–1 | Sheffield United | Sixfields Stadium |
| 19:45 | Richards 58' (pen.) | (Report) | Butler 27' |

| 25 July 2014 | Sheffield United | 4–2 | (Scotland) Dundee | Bramall Lane |
| 19:00 | Murphy 7'; Basham 50'; Baxter 63'; McNulty 69' | (Report) | Tankulić 24'; Konrad 84' | Attendance: 3,207 |

| 29 July 2014 | Sheffield United | 0–1 | Huddersfield Town | Bramall Lane |
| 19:45 | | (Report) | Hammill 78' | Attendance: 4,111 |

| 31 July 2014 | Sheffield United | 2–1 | (Turkey) Fenerbahçe | Bramall Lane |
| 19:30 | Porter 75'; Collins 90' | (Report) | Webó 13' |

| 2 August 2014 | York City | 2–0 | Sheffield United | Bootham Crescent |
| 13:00 | Jarvis 56', 69' | (Report) | | Attendance: 1,761 |
