= Marc McNulty =

Scottish footballer (born 1992)

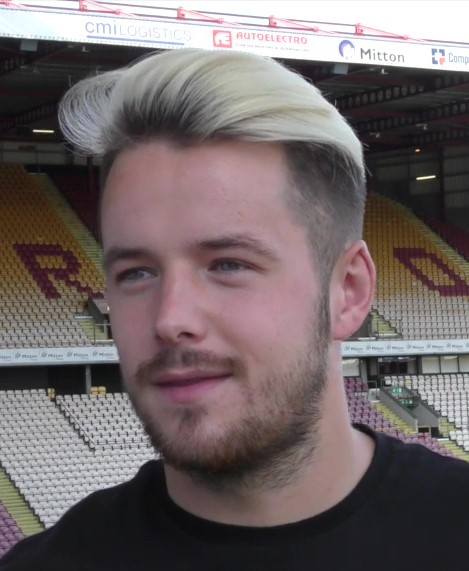
- McNulty in 2016

Personal information
- Full name: Marc Graeme McNulty
- Date of birth: 14 September 1992 (age 34)
- Place of birth: Edinburgh, Scotland
- Height: 5 ft 10 in (1.78 m)
- Position: Striker

Team information
- Current team: The Spartans

Youth career
- 1998–2003: Hutchison Vale
- 2003–2006: Celtic
- 2006–2009: Hibernian
- 2009–2010: Livingston

Senior career*
Years	Team	Apps	(Gls)
2009–2014	Livingston	105	(37)
2014–2017	Sheffield United	40	(10)
2015–2016	→ Portsmouth (loan)	27	(10)
2016–2017	→ Bradford City (loan)	15	(1)
2017–2018	Coventry City	42	(23)
2018–2022	Reading	13	(1)
2019	→ Hibernian (loan)	15	(7)
2019–2020	→ Sunderland (loan)	15	(2)
2020	→ Hibernian (loan)	6	(1)
2020–2021	→ Dundee United (loan)	25	(3)
2021–2022	→ Dundee United (loan)	19	(2)
2023	Orange County	24	(3)
2024	The Spartans	11	(2)
2024	Shamrock Rovers	10	(1)
2025	St George City	27	(14)
2025–	The Spartans	30	(13)

International career^{‡}
2019	Scotland	2	(0)
- * Club domestic league appearances and goals as of 9 August 2025 ‡ National team caps and goals as of 13:21, 17 October 2019 (UTC)

Marc Graeme McNulty (born 14 September 1992) is a Scottish professional footballer who plays as a striker for The Spartans.

He began his career with Livingston, moving to England aged 21 to play for Sheffield United. Following loan spells at Portsmouth and Bradford City, in 2017 he moved to Coventry City. After a season in which he helped Coventry win promotion via the playoffs, McNulty was sold to Reading.

While at Reading, McNulty was loaned out to Hibernian (twice), Sunderland and Dundee United. During his first loan with Hibernian, he earned selection for the Scotland national team, winning two caps.

== Club career ==
=== Livingston ===
McNulty was in the youth team that won the SFL under-19 League and Cup double in 2008–09, and further league titles in 2009–10 and 2010–11.

McNulty attended Portobello High School and played for the youth teams of Hutchison Vale, Celtic and Hibernian. After being released by Hibernian, he felt he "wasn't going to make it in football" and "it was over". He signed for second-tier Livingston aged 16, but the club were immediately demoted to the bottom level of Scottish league football for financial reasons, albeit this drop to a lower level gave him opportunities in senior football earlier than would otherwise have been expected. He made a goalscoring debut at on 31 October 2009 after coming on as a late substitute in a 3–0 away win over Montrose, and made nine appearances in his debut season in the first team (Livingston were promoted as champions), while a prolific goalscoring record at under-19 level earned him a new three-year contract in February 2010. The following season in the Second Division, he made only five league appearances in a campaign interrupted by injury, although the club were promoted again.

2011–12 saw McNulty emerge as Livingston's top goalscorer as they returned to the First Division, netting 16 goals in all competitions. His form saw him attract the attention of clubs south of the border such as Sheffield United and Derby County. He extended his stay with Livingston on 25 July 2013 by signing a new two-year contract. His final campaign with the Lions was his most productive, with 17 league goals from 35 appearances.

=== Sheffield United ===
On 19 May 2014, McNulty joined Sheffield United on a three-year deal for an undisclosed fee which would become effective on 1 July 2014. The transfer fee was believed to be between £95,000 and £125,000. McNulty scored his first competitive goal for the Blades in a 2–1 League Cup first round win over Mansfield Town on 13 August 2014. In November 2014, he was ruled out after sustaining a facial injury after an altercation in a night club in Edinburgh, with United manager Nigel Clough claiming that McNulty was the "innocent party". On 16 December 2014, McNulty scored the only goal in a 1–0 home victory over Southampton to send United to the semi-finals of the League Cup.

On 6 November 2015, McNulty joined Portsmouth on a short-term loan deal. On 7 November he made his debut in the first round FA Cup game against Macclesfield Town, with Portsmouth winning 2–1. On 24 November 2015, he scored a hat-trick in a 6–0 win against York City. On 4 January 2016, his loan at Portsmouth was extended until the end of the season after scoring six goals in 11 appearances.

On 31 August 2016, McNulty joined Bradford City on a season-long loan deal. He was recalled by Sheffield United on 2 January 2017.

=== Coventry City ===
On 18 May 2017, McNulty agreed to join League Two side Coventry City on a two-year deal. He scored his first goal for the club in his second appearance in a 2–0 win against Grimsby Town. On 12 May 2018, in the home leg of the promotion play-off semi-finals against Notts County, McNulty scored his 100th career goal – a controversial penalty – to make the scoreline 1–1 going into the away leg at Meadow Lane, where he scored again in Coventry's 4–1 win, sending them to the final on 28 May. McNulty was named man-of-the-match in the final, a 3–1 win over Exeter City which saw the Sky Blues promoted to back to League One.

=== Reading ===
On 6 July 2018, Reading announced the signing of McNulty to a four-year contract for an undisclosed fee. He made only six starts for the Royals during the first half of the 2018–19 season, and was loaned to Hibernian on 31 January 2019, returning to the club a decade after being released by them as a teenager. He scored his first goal for Hibs on 9 February, in a 3–1 win against Raith Rovers.

McNulty moved on loan to Sunderland for the 2019–20 season. He scored his first goal for Sunderland in an EFL Cup tie against Accrington Stanley on 13 August 2019. His loan with Sunderland was cut short on 31 January 2020, and McNulty was then sent on loan to Hibernian for a second time. Following the formal conclusion of the truncated 2019–20 season, McNulty returned to his parent club in May 2020.

On 5 October 2020, McNulty joined Dundee United on a season-long loan deal. McNulty scored five goals in thirty games for Dundee United in the 2020–21 season.

On 13 August 2021, McNulty re-signed for Dundee United on a season-long loan.

=== Orange County SC ===
On 19 January 2023, McNulty signed with Orange County SC in the American second division, the USL Championship.

=== The Spartans ===
In February 2024, McNulty returned to Scottish football as he signed a deal until the end of the season with Scottish League Two club The Spartans after training with them since New Year.

=== Shamrock Rovers ===
On 8 August 2024, McNulty signed for League of Ireland Premier Division club Shamrock Rovers until the end of their season.

=== St George City ===
On 31 January 2025, McNulty signed for Australian National Premier Leagues NSW side St George City.

=== Return to Spartans ===
He returned to his home nation, signing for previous club The Spartans on the 4th of September 2025.

== International career ==
McNulty received his first call-up to the Scotland squad in March 2019. He made his debut for Scotland coming on as a substitute for James Forrest in a 3–0 defeat to Kazakhstan in a Euro 2020 qualifier.

== Career statistics ==
=== Club ===
As of match played 1 November 2024

Appearances and goals by club, season and competition
Club	Season	League			National Cup		League Cup		Other		Total	
Club	Season	Division	Apps	Goals	Apps	Goals	Apps	Goals	Apps	Goals	Apps	Goals
Livingston	2009–10	Scottish Third Division	9	1	0	0	0	0	0	0	9	1
Livingston	2010–11	Scottish Second Division	5	1	0	0	1	0	1 (Note: Appearances in the Scottish Challenge Cup)	0	7	1
Livingston	2011–12	Scottish First Division	30	11	2	4	2	1	3	0	37	16
Livingston	2012–13	Scottish First Division	26	7	1	0	3	4	1	0	31	11
Livingston	2013–14	Scottish Championship	35	17	1	0	2	1	1	1	39	19
Livingston	Total		105	37	4	4	8	6	6	1	122	48
Sheffield United	2014–15	League One	31	9	4	2	6	2	2 (Note: One appearance in the Football League Trophy and one in the League One play-offs)	0	43	13
Sheffield United	2015–16	League One	5	1	0	0	2	0	1 (Note: Appearances in the Football League Trophy)	0	8	1
Sheffield United	2016–17	League One	4	0	0	0	1	0	—		5	0
Sheffield United	Total		40	10	4	2	9	2	3	0	56	14
Portsmouth (loan)	2015–16	League Two	27	10	5	1	0	0	2 (Note: Appearances in the League Two play-offs)	1	34	12
Bradford City (loan)	2016–17	League One	15	1	0	0	0	0	1	0	16	1
Coventry City	2017–18	League Two	42	23	5	1	0	0	5 (Note: Three appearances in the play-offs and two in the EFL Trophy)	4	52	28
Reading	2018–19	Championship	13	1	0	0	2	0	—		15	1
Reading	2019–20	Championship	0	0	0	0	0	0	—		0	0
Reading	2020–21	Championship	0	0	0	0	2	0	—		2	0
Reading	2021–22	Championship	0	0	0	0	0	0	—		0	0
Reading	Total		13	1	0	0	4	0	—		17	1
Hibernian (loan)	2018–19	Scottish Premiership	15	7	2	1	0	0	—		17	8
Sunderland (loan)	2019–20	League One	15	2	1	0	2	2	3	1	21	5
Hibernian (loan)	2019–20	Scottish Premiership	6	1	2	3	0	0	—		8	4
Dundee United (loan)	2020–21	Scottish Premiership	25	3	4	2	1	0	—		30	5
Dundee United (loan)	2021–22	Scottish Premiership	19	2	3	1	2	0	—		24	3
Dundee United (loan)	Total		44	5	7	3	3	0	—		54	8
Orange County	2023	USL Championship	24	3	0	0	—		1 (Note: Appearance in the 2023 USL Championship Playoffs)	0	25	3
The Spartans	2023–24	Scottish League Two	11	2	—		—		4 (Note: Appearance in the 2024 Scottish League One Playoffs)	0	15	2
Shamrock Rovers	2024	LOI Premier Division	10	1	—		—		1 (Note: Appearance in the UEFA Europa League)	0	11	1
Career total			367	103	30	15	26	10	26	7	449	135

=== International ===
As of 16:36, 19 May 2019 (UTC)

Appearances and goals by national team and year
National team	Year	Apps	Goals
Scotland	2019	2	0
Total		2	0

== Honours ==
Livingston Youth

- SFL U-19 League: 2008–09, 2009–10 2010–11
- SFL U-19 League Cup: 2008–09

Coventry City

- EFL League Two play-offs: 2018

Individual

- PFA Fans' Player of the Year: 2017–18 League Two
- EFL League Two Player of the Month: January 2018
