= Jasper Johns (footballer) =

English footballer (born 1995)

Personal information
- Full name: Jasper Nathaniel Johns
- Date of birth: 6 February 1995 (age 31)
- Place of birth: Stafford, England
- Position: Defender

Youth career
- Port Vale
- Everton

Senior career*
Years	Team	Apps	(Gls)
2013–2014	Sheffield United	1	(0)
2017–20??	Stafford Town		

International career
2009–2010	England U16	6	(0)
- * Club domestic league appearances and goals

Jasper Nathaniel Johns (born 6 February 1995) is an English former footballer who played as a defender. Born in Stafford, he began his career as a youngster with Port Vale followed by a spell with Everton before making the switch to United.

== Club career ==
Johns started his career at Port Vale before spending time at Everton's academy. Following his release by Everton, Johns joined Sheffield United in June 2013 on a two-year deal. Johns made his professional début for Sheffield United when he came on as a substitute in a 1–1 draw with Colchester United at Bramall Lane on 17 August 2013. This turned out to be his only appearance that season and he was released by United on 16 May 2014 when his contract expired. He joined Midland League Division One club Stafford Town in July 2017.

== International career ==
Born in Stafford, Johns is eligible to represent England, Jamaica, Singapore, Northern Ireland and Scotland at international level. Johns earned six caps for England U16s. On 5 August 2013, Johns was called up to Northern Ireland U19s for a friendly match against Scotland U19s. Later that month, he was called up again to Northern Ireland U19s for a match against Austria U19 on 11 September 2013.

== Career statistics ==
Appearances and goals by club, season and competition
Club	Season	League			FA Cup		League Cup		Other		Total	
Club	Season	Division	Apps	Goals	Apps	Goals	Apps	Goals	Apps	Goals	Apps	Goals
Sheffield United	2013–14	League One	1	0	0	0	0	0	0	0	1	0
Career total			1	0	0	0	0	0	0	0	1	0
