= Conor Coady =

English footballer (born 1993)

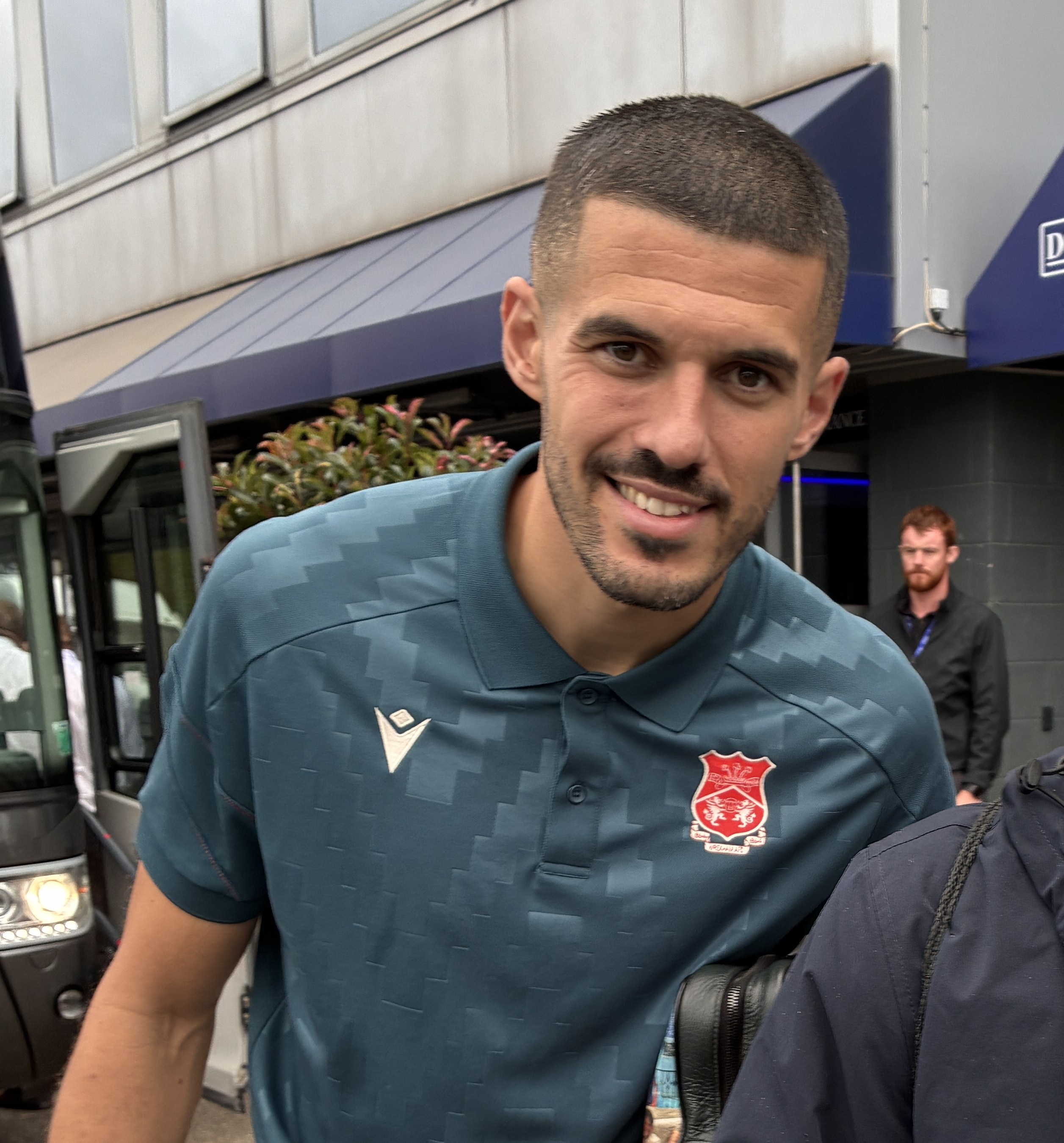
- Coady with Wrexham in 2025

Personal information
- Full name: Conor David Coady
- Date of birth: 25 February 1993 (age 33)
- Place of birth: St Helens, Merseyside, England
- Height: 6 ft 1 in (1.85 m)
- Positions: Centre-back; defensive midfielder

Team information
- Current team: England U21 (assistant coach)

Youth career
- –2005: Rainford Rangers
- 2005–2011: Liverpool

Senior career*
Years	Team	Apps	(Gls)
2011–2014	Liverpool	1	(0)
2013–2014	→ Sheffield United (loan)	39	(5)
2014–2015	Huddersfield Town	45	(3)
2015–2023	Wolverhampton Wanderers	273	(6)
2022–2023	→ Everton (loan)	24	(1)
2023–2025	Leicester City	34	(1)
2025–2026	Wrexham	5	(0)
2026	→ Charlton Athletic (loan)	12	(1)
Total		433	(17)

International career
2009	England U16	4	(0)
2009–2010	England U17	17	(0)
2010–2011	England U18	2	(0)
2011	England U19	12	(0)
2013	England U20	4	(1)
2020–2022	England	10	(1)
Medal record
Men's football
Representing England
UEFA European Under-17 Championship
Winner	2010 Liechtenstein
UEFA European Championship
Runner-up	2020 Europe
- * Club domestic league appearances and goals

Conor David Coady (born 25 February 1993) is an English professional football coach and former player who played as a centre-back or defensive midfielder. He is an assistant coach of the England national under-21 team.

Coady came through the academy system at Liverpool and made two appearances for the first team before spending a season on loan at Sheffield United and then moving to Huddersfield Town on a permanent transfer in 2014. A year later he signed for Wolverhampton Wanderers for £2 million and played over 300 games for the club, winning the Championship in the 2017–18 season. In 2022–23, he was sent on loan to Everton, before joining Leicester City in 2023.

Coady represented England at youth level, being named in the team of the tournament as England won the 2010 UEFA European Under-17 Championship and captaining the England under-20 team at the 2013 FIFA U-20 World Cup. He made his debut for the senior team in 2020 and was part of the squad that came runners-up at UEFA Euro 2020.

== Early life ==
Coady was born in St Helens, Merseyside, and grew up in nearby Haydock. He is of Irish descent through a grandparent. He attended Bleak Hill Primary School, Windle and Rainford High Technology College. He grew up supporting Liverpool.

== Club career ==
=== Liverpool ===
Coady is a product of the Liverpool Youth Academy after joining the club in 2005. During the 2010–11 season, Coady was on the fringes of the first team, making the substitutes' bench twice but failed to make a first-team appearance. Coady played every Reserve League and NextGen Series match during the 2011–12 season, scoring five goals. Despite being named in the senior squad list and being called up to the senior squad occasionally from 2009, he did not make his senior debut until 8 November 2012 in a UEFA Europa League group stage match against Anzhi Makhachkala. After Andre Wisdom's promotion as a full-time senior squad member, Conor Coady was installed as full-time captain of the Under-21 squad and on 12 May 2013 he made his Premier League debut in a 3–1 win at Fulham.

Coady agreed a six-month loan with League One club Sheffield United on 22 July 2013, later stating that he had turned down the chance to go on Liverpool's pre-season tour of Australia and the Far East in order to join up with his new club. Coady made his debut for the Blades in the opening fixture of the following season, coming on as a second-half substitute in a 2–1 home victory over Notts County, and made his first start for the club in the following game, a League Cup first round defeat to League Two club Burton Albion.

Coady scored his first senior goal in a 1–1 draw at Leyton Orient on 30 November 2013. Having been in and out of the team during the first half of the season, Coady began to cement a regular first-team place over the Christmas period, prompting United to extend his loan spell during the January transfer window, and once more in February to extend his stay until the end of the season. Coady played regularly for the Blades for the remainder of the season, including playing on the losing side in the 5-3 loss to Hull City in the FA Cup semi-final and returned to Anfield having played 50 games and scored six goals.

=== Huddersfield Town ===
On 6 August 2014, Coady signed for Championship club Huddersfield Town on a three-year contract for a fee believed to be around £375,000. He made his debut as a substitute in the 4–0 defeat by AFC Bournemouth on 9 August. On 1 October, he scored his first goal for the club against Wolverhampton Wanderers where Town won 3–1 at Molineux Stadium. He again found the net, this time in a 2–2 draw against Rotherham United.

=== Wolverhampton Wanderers ===
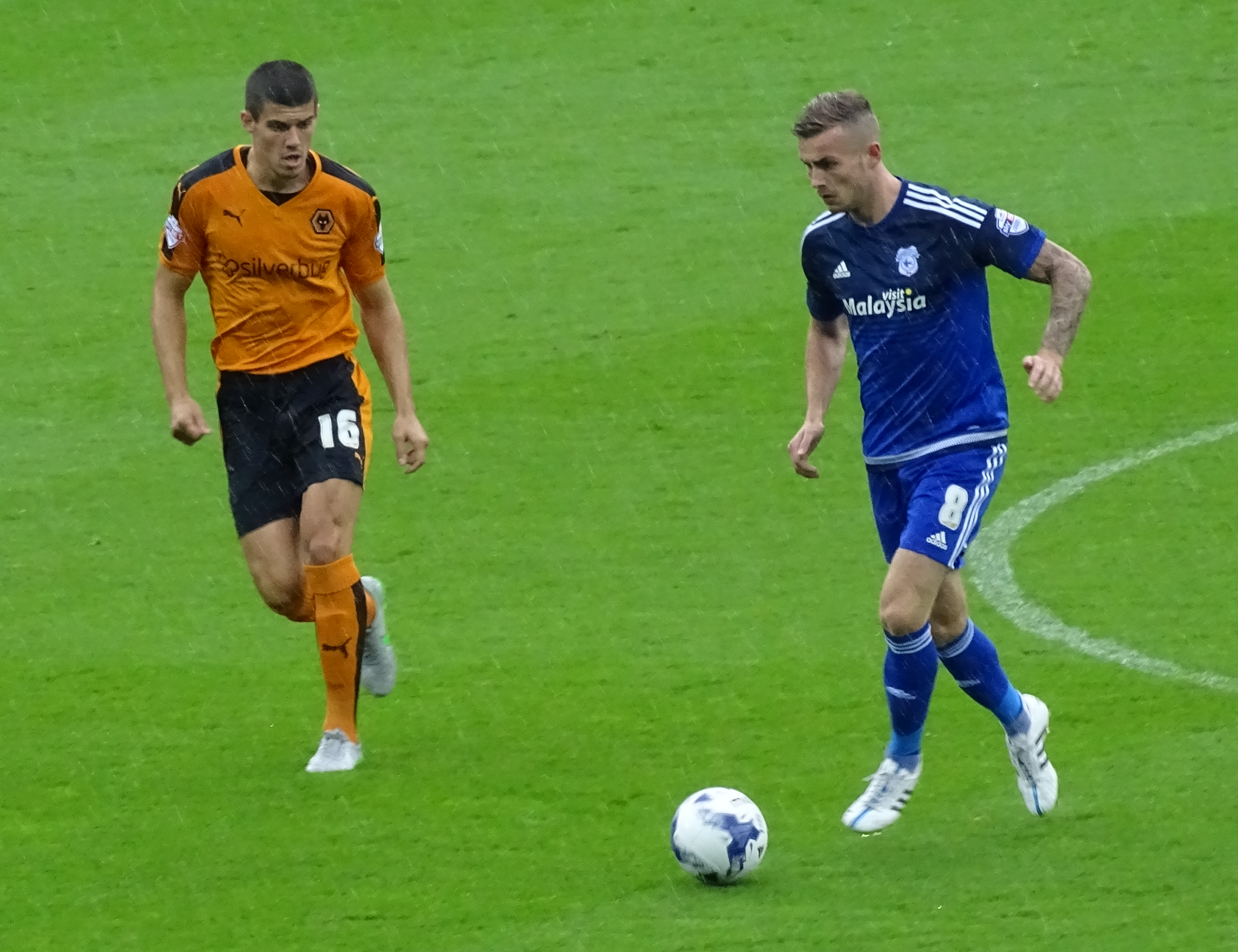
Coady (left, in yellow) playing for Wolverhampton Wanderers in 2015

On 3 July 2015, Coady signed for Championship club Wolverhampton Wanderers on a three-year contract for an undisclosed fee, believed to be around £2 million. He scored his first goal for Wolves in a 2–1 EFL Cup first round win against Crawley Town on 9 August 2016.

Under new head coach Nuno Espírito Santo, Coady moved to the centre of a three-man defence for Wolves from the 2017–18 season onward, where he spent much of the season as club captain, and was full-time captain with the club's return to the Premier League from the 2018–19 season. In September 2017 he signed a new four-year contract. On 21 April 2018, during his 120th league appearance for Wolves, he scored a 66th-minute penalty in a 4–0 win against Bolton Wanderers to record his first league goal for the club, as Wolves sealed the Championship title.

On 15 February 2019, Coady signed a new contract lasting to June 2023. He was an ever-present player for Wolves in both the 2018–19 and 2019–20 Premier League seasons as they achieved consecutive seventh-place finishes. He also played every minute of Wolves' Europa League campaign in 2019–20 as they reached the quarter-finals. At the end of the competition, he was named in UEFA's Squad of the Season.

On 30 September 2020, three weeks after Coady won his first full England cap, he signed a new five-year deal with the club, keeping him at Wolves until 2025. In late November, he missed the game against Southampton as he had been in contact with a person diagnosed with COVID-19; this broke an 84-game streak of playing every minute (7,560 in total), third-best for outfield players in the history of the Premier League.

Coady scored his first-ever Premier League goal, a header, in a 4–1 away defeat to Manchester City on 2 March 2021. His first home goal in the league was the following 15 January, on his 298th appearance for the club, in a 3–1 victory over Southampton. On 5 February 2022, he made his 300th competitive appearance for Wolves against Norwich City at home in the fourth round of the FA Cup. He scored the only goal on 13 March in a win at Everton that constituted Wolves's 1,000th win in top-flight football (over 67 seasons dating back to 1888) and also sealed their first league double over that opponent since 1972–73.

==== Loan to Everton ====
On 8 August 2022, Coady signed for Premier League club Everton on a season-long loan with an option to buy. He made his debut five days later in a 2–1 loss at Aston Villa, leaving the game with a late injury. On 3 September, he put the ball in the net in the Merseyside derby against his childhood team Liverpool, but it was ruled offside in a goalless draw. He scored his first goal for Everton in a 2–1 away win against Southampton on 1 October.

After Frank Lampard was replaced as manager by Sean Dyche in January 2023, Coady started the first four games of the new tenure. Following a 2–0 home loss to Aston Villa on 25 February, he was dropped as Michael Keane and James Tarkowski – both of whom played for Burnley under Dyche – were preferred.

On 1 June 2023, Everton announced that Coady was returning to Wolves, with the media reporting that Everton had decided not to take up an option to sign him permanently.

=== Leicester City ===
On 1 July 2023, Coady joined EFL Championship club Leicester City on a three-year contract for a reported £7.5m fee. He was injured for the first time in his career during pre-season, suffering a foot injury that kept him unavailable for selection until September. On 27 September, he made his debut for the club as a starter in a 3–1 away loss in the third round of EFL Cup against his childhood team Liverpool. On 11 May 2025, Coady scored his first goal for the club against local rivals Nottingham Forest in a 2–2 draw.

Across two seasons for The Foxes, Coady has 43 matches and 2 goals. He was a part of the winning squad of 2023-24 EFL Championship.

=== Wrexham ===
On 1 August 2025, Coady joined EFL Championship club Wrexham on a two-year contract for a fee believed to be around £2 million, or $2.7 million. However, he only made 6 appearances and totaled 517 minutes played for the Welsh side during the first half of the season.

On 29 January 2026, Coady joined Championship rivals Charlton Athletic on loan for the remainder of the season. On 31 August 2026, Wrexham announced that Coady reached an agreement with the club to terminate his contract. He subsequently spent time training and coaching with the Liverpool Under-21s. On 6 November 2026, Coady announced his retirement from professional football.

== International career ==
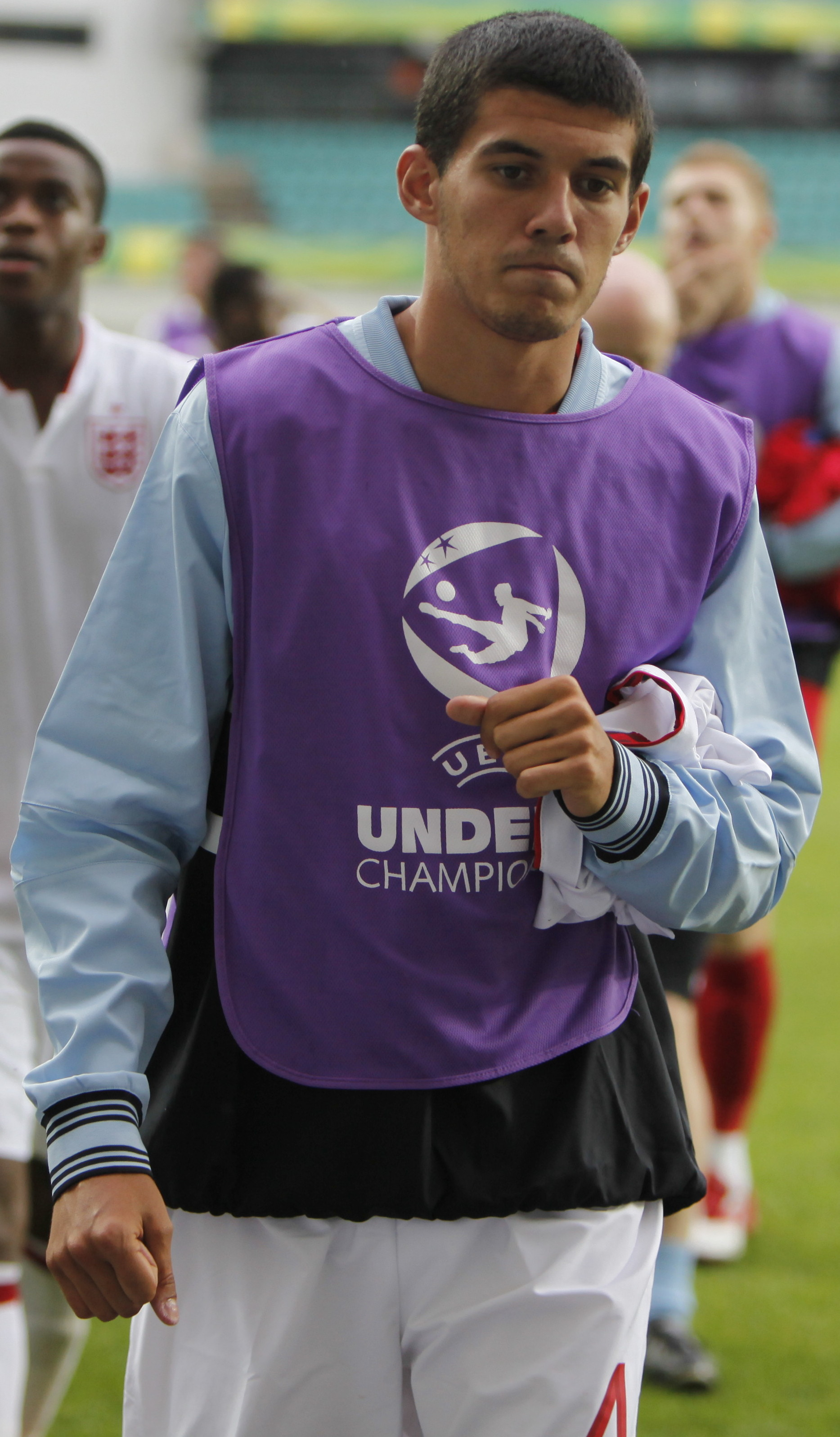
Coady with England U19 during the 2012 UEFA European Under-19 Championship.

Coady has represented England from under-16 to under-20 youth levels. He has been capped 17 times for the England national under-17 football team. He played and captained the England team at the 2010 UEFA European Under-17 Championship in Liechtenstein where he and his England colleagues won the tournament, and became the first England team to win an international tournament in 17 years. He was then part of the 2012 UEFA European Under-19 Championship in Estonia in which England got as far as the semi-finals where they were knocked out by Greece. He was named captain of the England under-20 team by manager Peter Taylor for the 2013 FIFA U-20 World Cup. He made his debut for the team on 16 June, in a 3–0 win in a warm-up game against Uruguay. On 23 June, he scored in the opening group-stage game against Iraq.

In August 2020, Coady was called up to the England senior squad by then-manager Gareth Southgate for the Nations League matches against Iceland and Denmark, starting in central defence against the latter on 8 September in a 0–0 draw, and in doing so becoming the first Wolves player to start for England since Steve Bull in 1990. Coady was awarded man of the match by Sky Sports. On 8 October 2020, Coady scored his first goal for England in his second appearance, a 3–0 friendly win against Wales at Wembley.

Coady was in the England squad that came runners-up at UEFA Euro 2020, held in 2021. Though he did not play any games, he was dubbed England's "player of the tournament" by assistant manager Steve Holland, who believed that his presence in the team's camp was similar to that of John Terry when he played less often in his final years at Chelsea. He was later included in the squad for the 2022 FIFA World Cup in Qatar, though again he did not make any appearances in the tournament, as England lost 2–1 to France in the quarterfinals.

== Coaching career ==
On 4 September 2026, Coady joined England U21s as an assistant coach.

== Personal life ==
In November 2021, Coady was named Football Ally of the Year at the British LGBT Awards for his outspoken support for gay footballers. Coady said that "Equality is a massive word, and when it comes to LGBTQ stuff, I'm big on making people feel involved." Coady concluded that in his team "[criticising a player based on their sexuality] would never be the case within [our] dressing room."

== Career statistics ==
=== Club ===
Appearances and goals by club, season and competition
Club	Season	League			FA Cup		League Cup		Europe		Other		Total	
Club	Season	Division	Apps	Goals	Apps	Goals	Apps	Goals	Apps	Goals	Apps	Goals	Apps	Goals
Liverpool	2010–11	Premier League	0	0	0	0	0	0	0	0	—		0	0
Liverpool	2011–12	Premier League	0	0	0	0	0	0	0	0	—		0	0
Liverpool	2012–13	Premier League	1	0	0	0	0	0	1 (Note: Appearance(s) in UEFA Europa League)	0	—		2	0
Liverpool	Total		1	0	0	0	0	0	1	0	—		2	0
Sheffield United (loan)	2013–14	League One	39	5	8	1	1	0	—		2 (Note: Appearances in Football League Trophy)	0	50	6
Huddersfield Town	2014–15	Championship	45	3	1	0	2	0	—		—		48	3
Wolverhampton Wanderers	2015–16	Championship	37	0	1	0	1	0	—		—		39	0
Wolverhampton Wanderers	2016–17	Championship	40	0	2	0	3	1	—		—		45	1
Wolverhampton Wanderers	2017–18	Championship	45	1	1	0	2	0	—		—		48	1
Wolverhampton Wanderers	2018–19	Premier League	38	0	6	0	2	0	—		—		46	0
Wolverhampton Wanderers	2019–20	Premier League	38	0	2	0	0	0	17	0	—		57	0
Wolverhampton Wanderers	2020–21	Premier League	37	1	2	0	1	0	—		—		40	1
Wolverhampton Wanderers	2021–22	Premier League	38	4	2	0	2	0	—		—		42	4
Wolverhampton Wanderers	Total		273	6	16	0	11	1	17	0	—		317	7
Everton (loan)	2022–23	Premier League	24	1	1	1	0	0	—		—		25	2
Leicester City	2023–24	Championship	12	0	4	0	1	0	—		—		17	0
Leicester City	2024–25	Premier League	22	1	1	0	3	1	—		—		26	2
Leicester City	Total		34	1	5	0	4	1	—		—		43	2
Wrexham	2025–26	Championship	5	0	0	0	1	0	—		—		6	0
Charlton Athletic (loan)	2025–26	Championship	12	1	—		—		—		—		12	1
Career total			433	17	31	2	19	2	18	0	2	0	503	21

=== International ===
Appearances and goals by national team and year
National team	Year	Apps	Goals
England	2020	3	1
England	2021	5	0
England	2022	2	0
Total		10	1

England score listed first, score column indicates score after each Coady goal

List of international goals scored by Conor Coady
No.	Date	Venue	Cap	Opponent	Score	Result	Competition	Ref.
1	8 October 2020	Wembley Stadium, London, England	2	Wales	2–0	3–0	Friendly	

== Honours ==
Wolverhampton Wanderers

- EFL Championship: 2017–18

Leicester City

- EFL Championship: 2023–24

England U17

- UEFA European Under-17 Championship: 2010

England

- UEFA European Championship runner-up: 2020

Individual

- UEFA European Under-17 Championship Team of the Tournament: 2010
- EFL Championship Team of the Season: 2017–18
- EFL Team of the Season: 2017–18
- UEFA Europa League Squad of the Season: 2019–20
