= 2013–14 Sheffield United F.C. season =

Sheffield United F.C.
2013–14 season
- Group Chairman: Abdullah bin Musa'ed bin Abdulaziz Al Saud (50%); Kevin McCabe (50%)
- Chairman: Dave Green
- Manager: David Weir (until 11 October 2013); Nigel Clough (from 23 October 2013)
- Stadium: Bramall Lane
- League One: 7th
- FA Cup: Semi-final (eliminated by Hull City)
- League Cup: First round (eliminated by Burton Albion)
- Football League Trophy: Second round (eliminated by Hartlepool United)
- Top goalscorer: League: Porter (7); All: Porter (11)
- Highest home attendance: League: 21,659 (vs Wolverhampton Wanderers); Cup: 30,048 (vs Charlton Athletic)
- Lowest home attendance: League: 14,796 (vs Walsall); Cup: 4,189 (vs Hartlepool United)
- Average home league attendance: 17,509
Home colours	Away colours

Sheffield United Football Club participated in League One, the third level of English football, during the 2013–14 season, after losing in the previous season's play-off semi final. The club appointed a new manager, former Scotland international David Weir, saw a new co-owner arrive in the form of Prince Abdullah bin Musa'ed bin Abdulaziz Al Saud and signed an influx of new players during the summer transfer window. Despite this the team saw a very poor start to the season, winning only one of their opening thirteen fixtures. This run of results saw David Weir depart the club to be replaced by former England International and former Derby County manager Nigel Clough. Despite beginning to improve performances on the pitch, United remained in relegation trouble into January, but then embarked on a lengthy run of form that would eventually see them finish in seventh in the table. Having been knocked out in the early rounds of both the League Cup and League Trophy, United enjoyed a lengthy run in the FA Cup, eventually reaching the competitions semi-final where they were narrowly beaten by Hull City.

== Background ==
United had spent the previous season challenging for promotion from League One under manager Danny Wilson. Despite spending much of the season in the automatic promotion positions, the team's home form was poor, winning only nine games all season. With results declining, United sacked manager Wilson in April, replacing him with coach Chris Morgan but this wasn't enough to change their fortunes and the side finished the season fifth. United met Yeovil Town in the play-offs semi-final but lost 2–1 on aggregate and were consigned to spend a third consecutive season in League One.

== Kit and sponsors ==
At the end of July, United unveiled new home and away kits for the following season. Produced by Macron, the home kit maintained the clubs traditional red and white stripes, albeit with the addition of a solid red panel across the shoulders and neck. The away kit was a complete change from previous seasons, consisting of an all yellow shirt with green trim plus green socks and shorts. The club also announced that the home kit would be sponsored by Spanish video game developer VSports, and the away kit would bear the logo of Chinese real estate company Top Spring. The following day the club also announced a new secondary shirt sponsor, with the logo for video game Football Manager appearing on the back of both the home and away shirts for the following season. In September United announced a secondary sponsor, with mobile phone distributor Shebang's logo appearing on the shorts of both the home and away kit.

== Season overview ==
=== The hunt for a new manager ===
Sheffield United started the close season without a permanent manager, with caretaker manager Chris Morgan looking after the position whilst a fixed term manager was appointed. Morgan had admitted that he wanted the job permanently, but the club opted to invite applications from experienced candidates. Meanwhile, the club restructured the football club board, with former chief executive Julian Winter returning to the role only a year after quitting the position. The process to find a new manager proved to be a lengthy one with many managers and coaches being linked to the vacant position including interim manager Chris Morgan, Paul Dickov Rob Page, Gareth Southgate, Russell Slade, Michael Appleton, Kenny Jackett, and Keith Curle. Graham Arnold of Central Coast Mariners, Stuart McCall of Motherwell and Karl Robinson of MK Dons all rejected approaches from Sheffield United. By the start of June Everton reserve team coach David Weir emerged as the clear favourite for the job, and was duly appointed on 10 June, signing a three-year deal.

=== Preseason ===
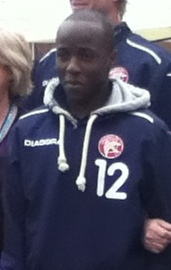
Forward Fabian Brandy joined the Blades in pre-season.

Unlike the previous three years, Sheffield United opted not to undertake a pre-season tour of Malta; instead preferring a short trip to Scotland for three matches, before returning to England for a trio of friendlies against League Two sides. At the start of June Barry Robson agreed a deal with Scottish Premier League club Aberdeen, signalling his departure from Bramall Lane. Later that week youth Team coach and former assistant manager, David Unsworth, was given permission by United to speak with Kilmarnock about their vacant managerial position, but rejected the approach.

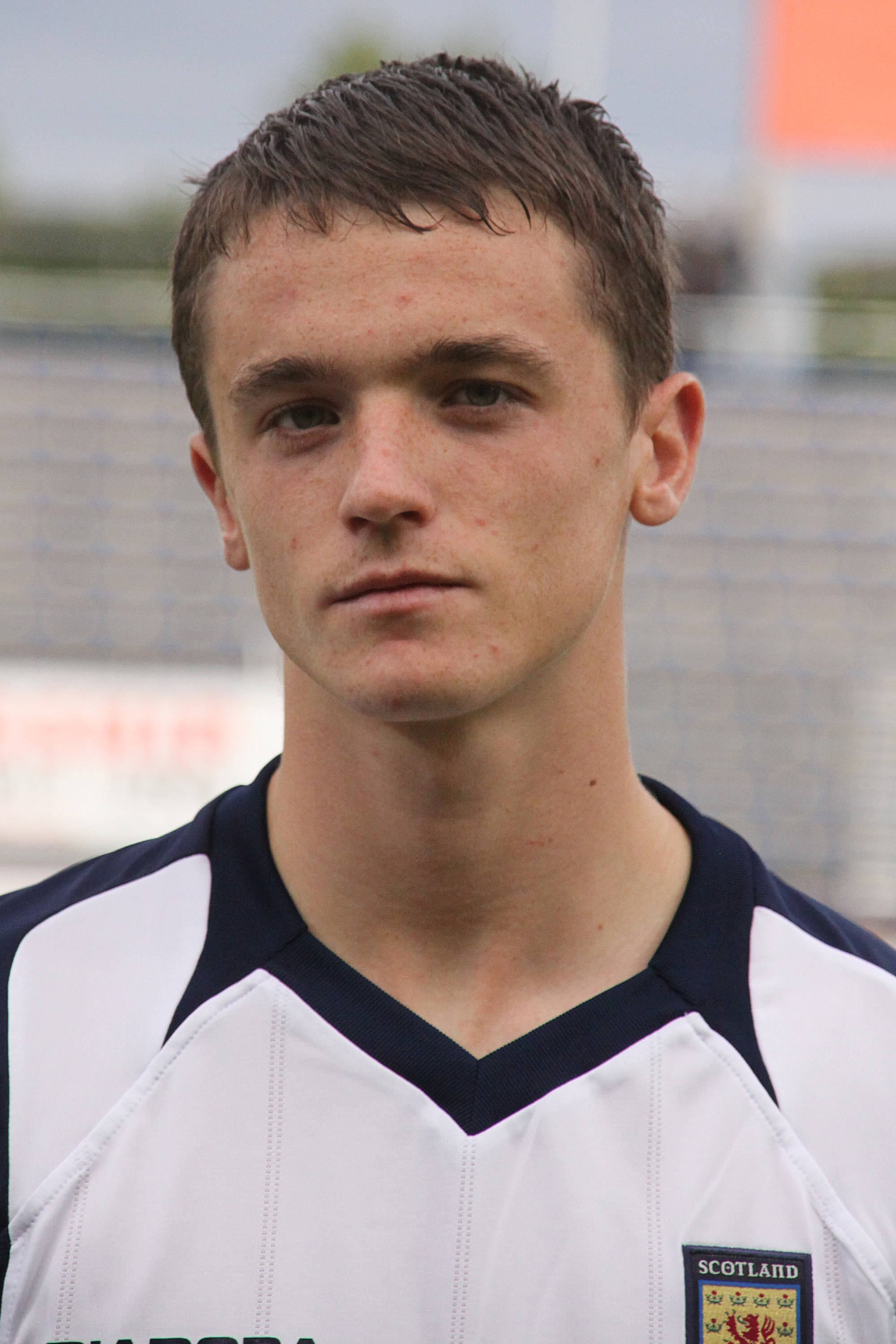
Stephen McGinn joined the Blades on a free transfer.

With Barry Robson having already left the club, United subsequently announced their retained list, and signalled the departure of Danny Coyne, Matthew Harriott, Lecsinel Jean-François and Dave Kitson. However they also indicated that Aaron Barry, Jordan Chapell, Danny Higginbotham, Jordan Hodder, Terry Kennedy, Callum McFadzean, Jahmal Smith and Elliott Whitehouse had all taken the option to have their contracts extended. Manager David Weir began to pull together his back-room team by appointing former Rangers fitness coach Adam Owen to the position of "Assistant Manager – Performance" on 21 June. A few days later United unveiled their first signings of the close season; Stephen McGinn from Watford, Sean McGinty from Manchester United and Febian Brandy from Walsall all on two-year deals; whilst Jasper Johns was signed from Everton signed a one-year deal.

At the start of July Weir added to his backroom staff by appointing former Everton teammate Lee Carsley to the position of "Assistant Manager – Technical". United opened their tour of Scotland with a 1–0 win over Greenock Morton thanks to a goal from Chris Porter, before a second Porter goal in as many games helped United to a 1–1 draw with Cowdenbeath a few days later. Despite the club having only recently extended his contract, Jordan Chapell was joined Torquay United on a free transfer on 9 July, agreeing a 2-year deal with the south coast club. United then completed their Scotland tour with a 2–1 victory over Raith Rovers. Returning south of the border, United next faced and away trip to Bury where they had to come from behind to register a 3–1 victory at Gigg Lane. The following week Richard Cresswell was allowed to leave on a free transfer, signing a one-year deal with York City, followed by United signing Falkirk striker Lyle Taylor for an undisclosed fee. Taylor made his first appearance for United in a friendly at Mansfield Town the following weekend, helping the Blades to a 1–0 victory thanks to a goal from Fabien Brandy. On 22 July United continued to revamp their squad by signing Conor Coady on a six-month loan from Liverpool, before a strong United side headed to Alfreton Town the same evening, registering a 1–0 victory. United completed their pre-season fixture list with two games in quick succession, holding Greek Super League side Atromitos to a 2–2 draw at Bramall Lane on 26 July, and then registering a 1–1 draw with York City less than 24 hours later. With the pre-season schedule completed David Weir confirmed that Michael Doyle would remain as Captain for the upcoming season.

=== August and September: The Prince of Bramall Lane ===
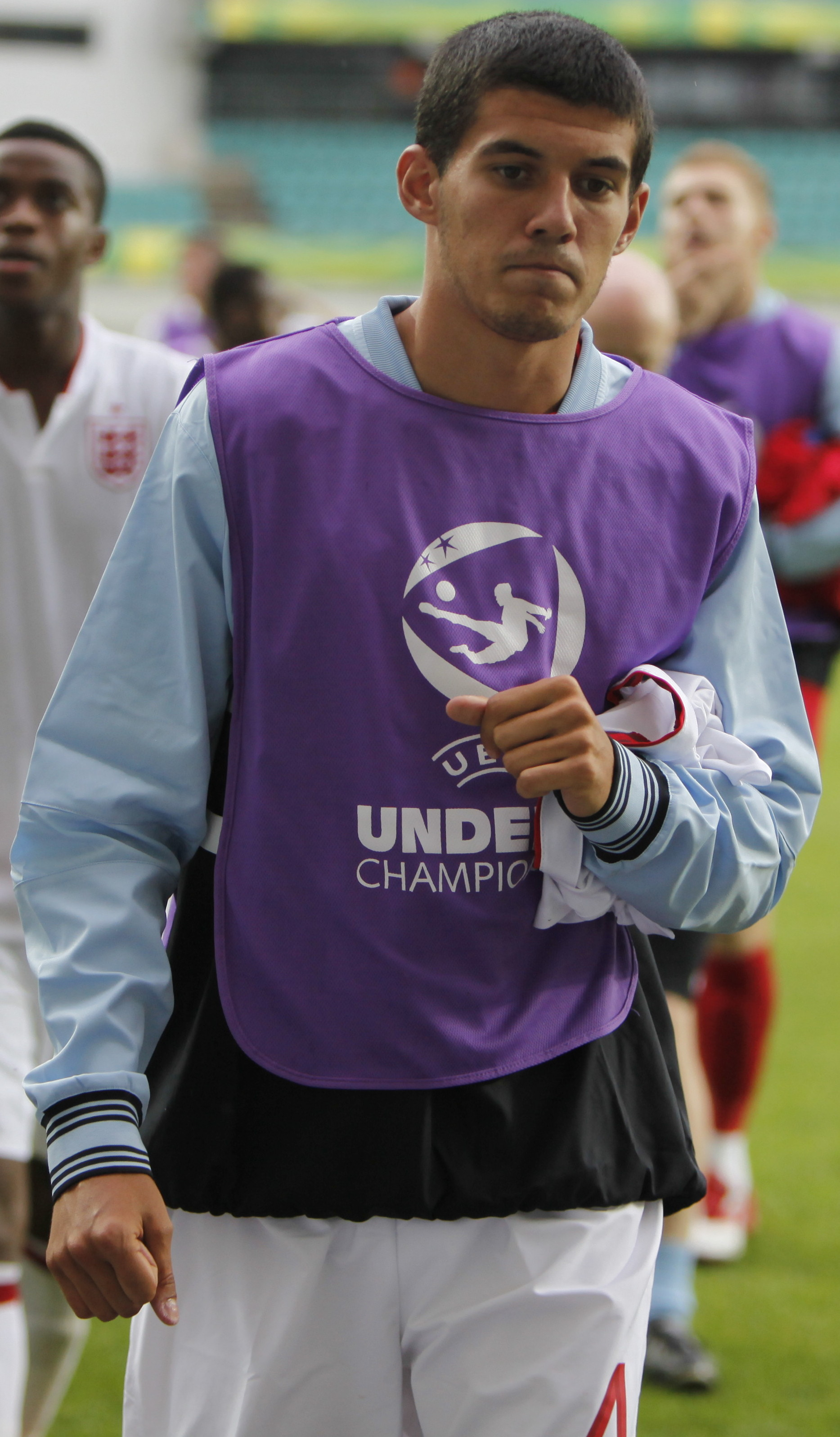
Conor Coady joined the Blades on loan.

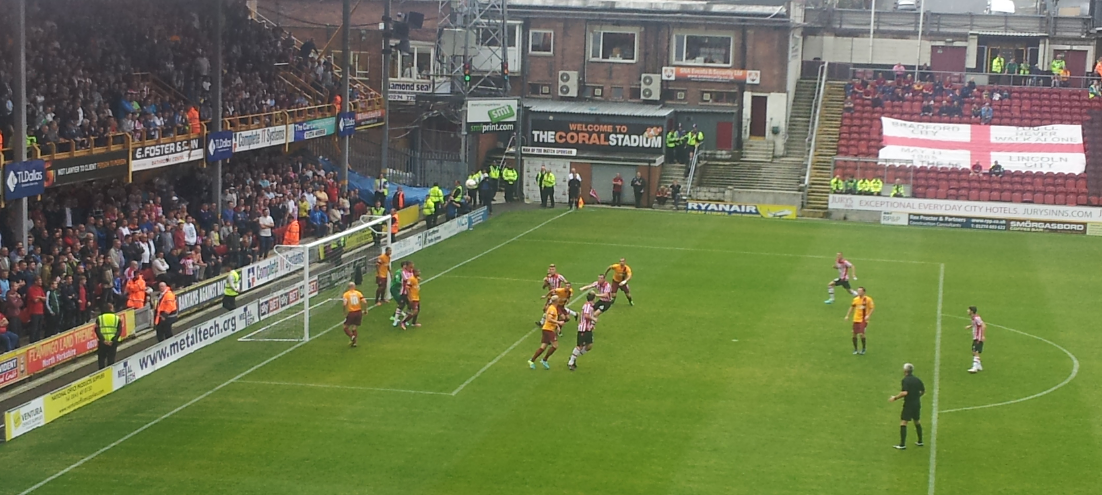
The Blades in the 2–0 loss to Bradford City at Valley Parade.

On the eve of the new season, coach and former assistant manager David Unsworth left the club, and later the same day Irish youngster Aaron Barry was allowed to join Scottish Championship club Dumbarton on loan until the end of January to gain first team experience. In celebration of The Football League's 125 anniversary, United featured in a televised opening fixture against Notts County in recognition of County being the oldest league club in the world, while Bramall Lane is the oldest football ground in the world. With Febian Brandy, Conor Coady, Stephen McGinn and Lyle Taylor all making their débuts, United triumphed 2–1 in the midst of a thunderstorm. In the next match United were knocked out in the first round of the League Cup by Burton Albion almost a year ago to the day to exactly the same fixture and outcome to the previous season. On 8 August George Long was called up to the England U21 team for a friendly match against Scotland U21s, and on the same day, Erik Tønne was recalled from his loan at HamKam so that he could sign for Sandnes Ulf on a permanent basis, ending his career with United. United's preparations for their next league game, away to Brentford were disrupted when Wolverhampton Wanderers had a bid accepted for midfielder Kevin McDonald, having triggered a release clause in his contract. United lost the subsequent fixture 3–1, and after lengthy negotiations, McDonald finally departed for an undisclosed fee on 14 August. The following day, Jamie McDonagh fractured his leg in two places whilst on international duty for Northern Ireland U19s, requiring acute surgery. Back in the league United were held to a 1–1 draw by Colchester United at Bramall Lane, followed by a 2–0 reverse at Bradford City. On 29 August Danny Higginbotham joined Chester after falling out of United's first team reckoning, while later the same day Jose Baxter joined from Oldham Athletic for an undisclosed fee on a three-year deal. Baxter made his United debut two days later but was unable to halt the club's poor form as they lost 1–0 to Milton Keynes Dons.

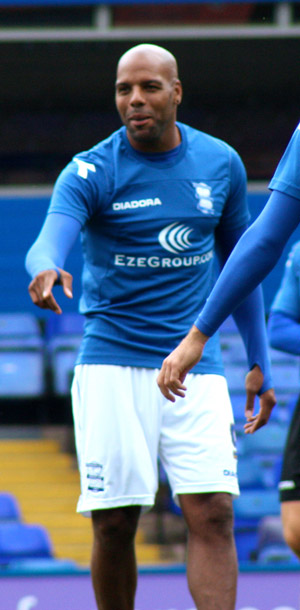
Forward Marlon King joined the Blades on a one-year deal.

On the final day of the transfer window, United brought in young Belgian midfielder Florent Cuvelier from Stoke City on a three-year deal for an undisclosed fee and centre-forward Harry Bunn on a one-month loan deal from Manchester City. The following day the club announced that Saudi Prince Abdullah bin Mosaad Al Saud, of the royal House of Saud and former President of Al-Hilal FC, had bought a 50% stake in United's parent company 'Blades Leisure Ltd' for the fee of £1 with the promise of providing "substantial new capital" with the aim of returning the Blades to the Premier League as "quickly as possible". The same evening, United reached the second round of the Football League Trophy, despite failing to score for the third game in succession, winning a penalty shoot out over Scunthorpe United after the game had finished 0–0. Back in league action United were again the losing side as they were beaten 3–1 by near neighbours Rotherham United. Later that week, youngster Elliott Whitehouse was allowed to join York City on a month's loan to gain first team experience, before United's poor form continued as they slipped to a 1–0 defeat away at Carlisle United. With the side still struggling to score goals, United reached an agreement to bring in free agent Marlon King until the end of the season, quickly followed by winger Ryan Hall, who joined the Blades on a one-month loan from Leeds United. King and Hall both made their United debuts in the following game, a home fixture against Preston North End, but the Blades poor form continued as they fell to a 1–0 loss, their fifth consecutive defeat in the league and Preston's first victory at Bramall Lane since 1978. United ended the month with another defeat, this time a 2–0 away loss to Wolves.

=== October and November: Weir Out, Clough In ===
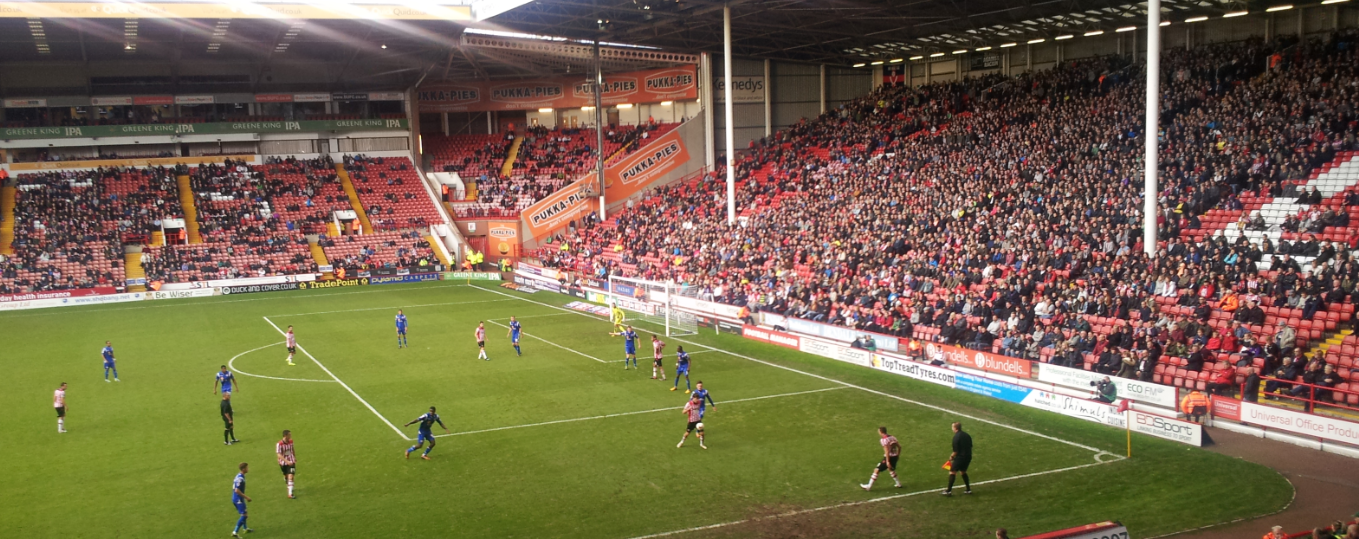
The Blades in their 3–1 home victory over Crewe Alexandra.

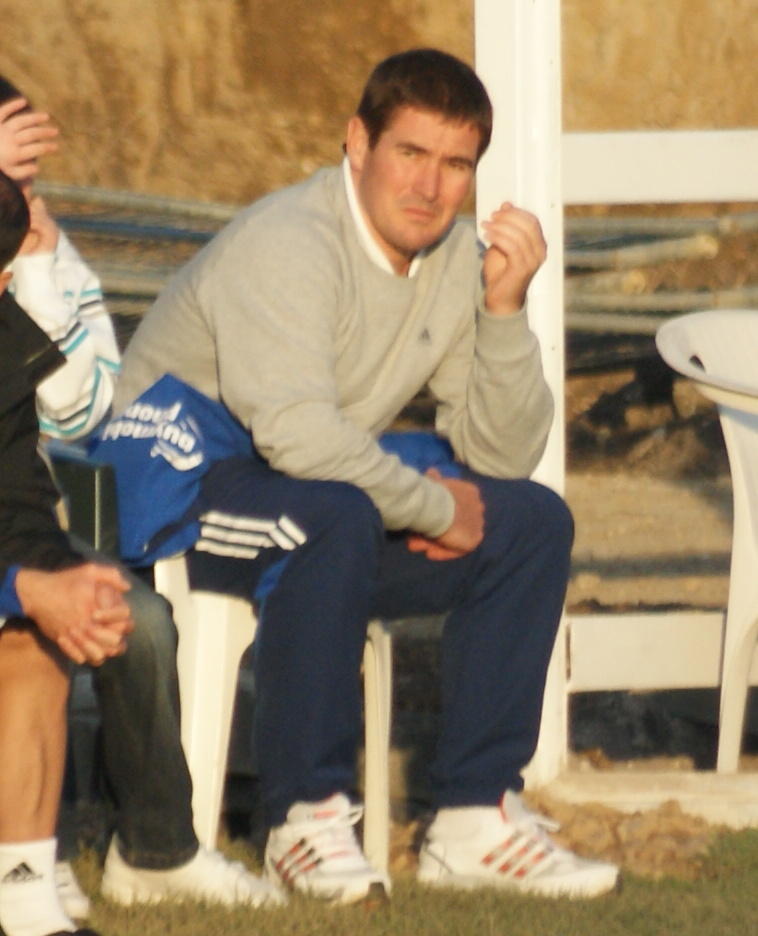
Nigel Clough replaced David Weir as United manager.

October began with the arrival of defender Simon Lappin who signed on a 28-day loan from Cardiff City on 4 October, while Chris Porter was allowed to leave in a similar deal for a spell with Chesterfield, and young striker Harry Bunn extended his own loan spell with the Blades for a further month. Lappin made his debut that same night as United scored their first goal in nearly seven hours of football, when Marlon King netted to earn a 1–1 home draw with Crawley Town. Another loss followed, this time to League Two Hartlepool United in the Football League Trophy, a match during which David Weir was barracked by the home support. This was to prove Weir's last game in charge as he was sacked three days later. With the club's Under-21s coach Chris Morgan in temporary charge once more, United dropped to the bottom of the League One table as they were defeated 3–2 by Coventry City. With United still to appoint a permanent successor to David Weir, Mick Wadsworth was appointed as first team coach on a temporary basis to support Chris Morgan, and the pair guided United to only their second win of the season as they beat Port Vale 2–1 at Bramall Lane. Ryan Hall returned to Leeds United, only to be immediately suspended by his parent club for a breach of discipline, while Morgan and Wadsworth remained in charge as United held Peterborough United to a mid-week 0–0 draw at their London Road Stadium. This was to prove Morgan's last game in charge of the Blades as former Derby County manager Nigel Clough was appointed as David Weir's permanent successor on 23 October 2013. Clough's tenure got off to a winning start as his new charges comfortably beat Crewe Alexandra 3–1 at Bramall Lane, before Clough made his first signing for the Blades a few days later, with Leeds United defender Aidan White joining on loan until New Year's Day.

Clough's second game in charge proved less satisfactory, with Febian Brandy being sent off only twelve minutes after coming on as a substitute and United slumping to a 2–0 defeat at Shrewsbury Town on 2 November. With his loan spell due to expire, United agreed a further deal to keep Simon Lappin at the club until January. The first round of the FA Cup saw the Blades progressed after a 3–2 victory over Colchester United, before Joe Ironside was allowed to join FC Halifax Town on loan until 5 January. Back in league action United suffered another home defeat, this time at the hands of Gillingham who ran out 2–1 winners. Callum McFadzean was allowed to join Chesterfield on loan until 3 January, before United registered their first away win since March, defeating fellow strugglers Bristol City 1–0 thanks to an own goal. United's followed this up with a 1–1 draw in a midweek home fixture against Walsall. With the loan window about to close Darryl Westlake was loaned to Mansfield Town, Marcus Williams joined Scunthorpe United, and Harry Bunn returned to Manchester City. United rounded off November with a 1–1 draw at Leyton Orient thanks to Conor Coady's first goal in senior football.

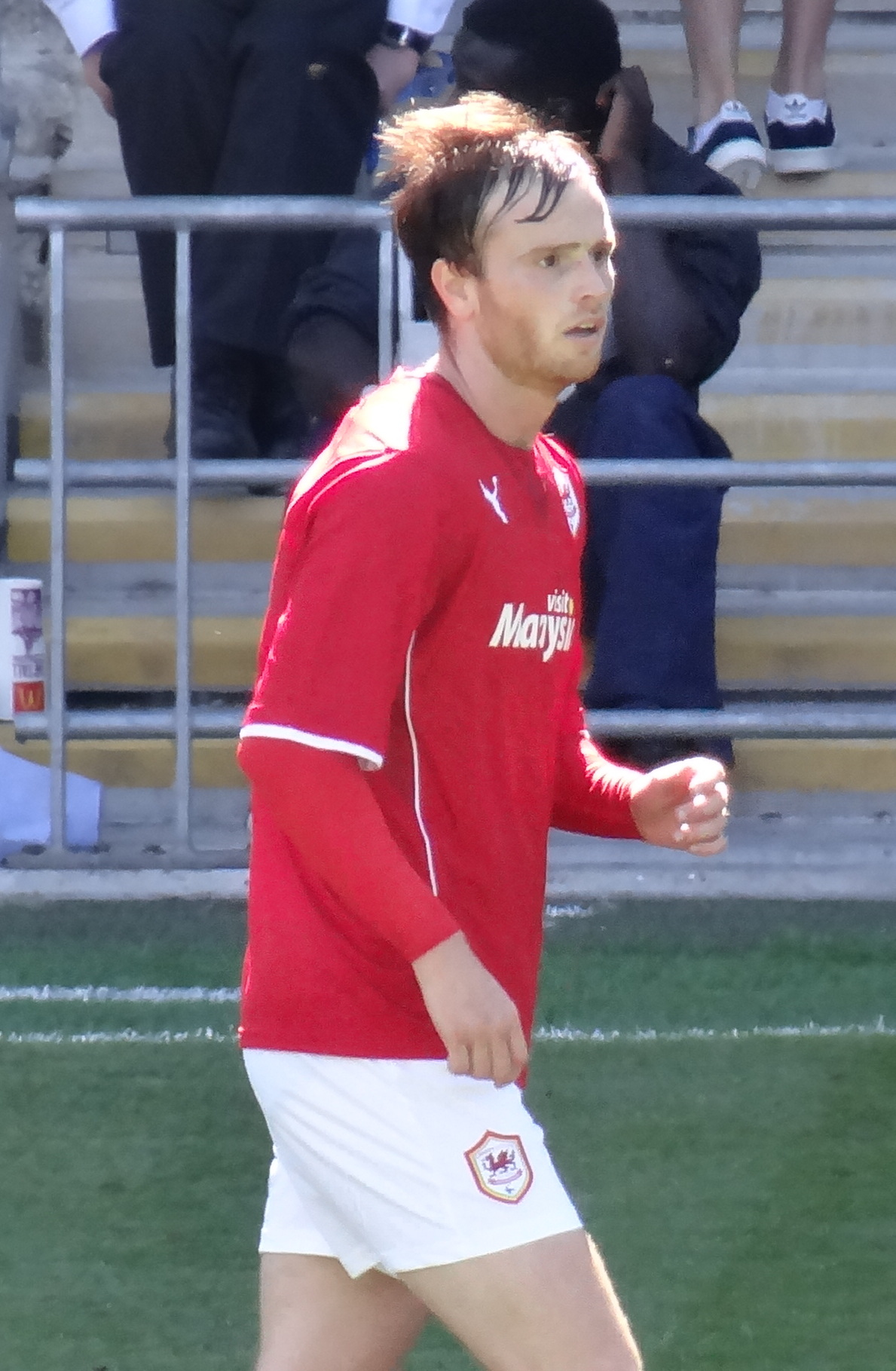
John Brayford joined United on loan in January.

=== December and January: Cup progress ===
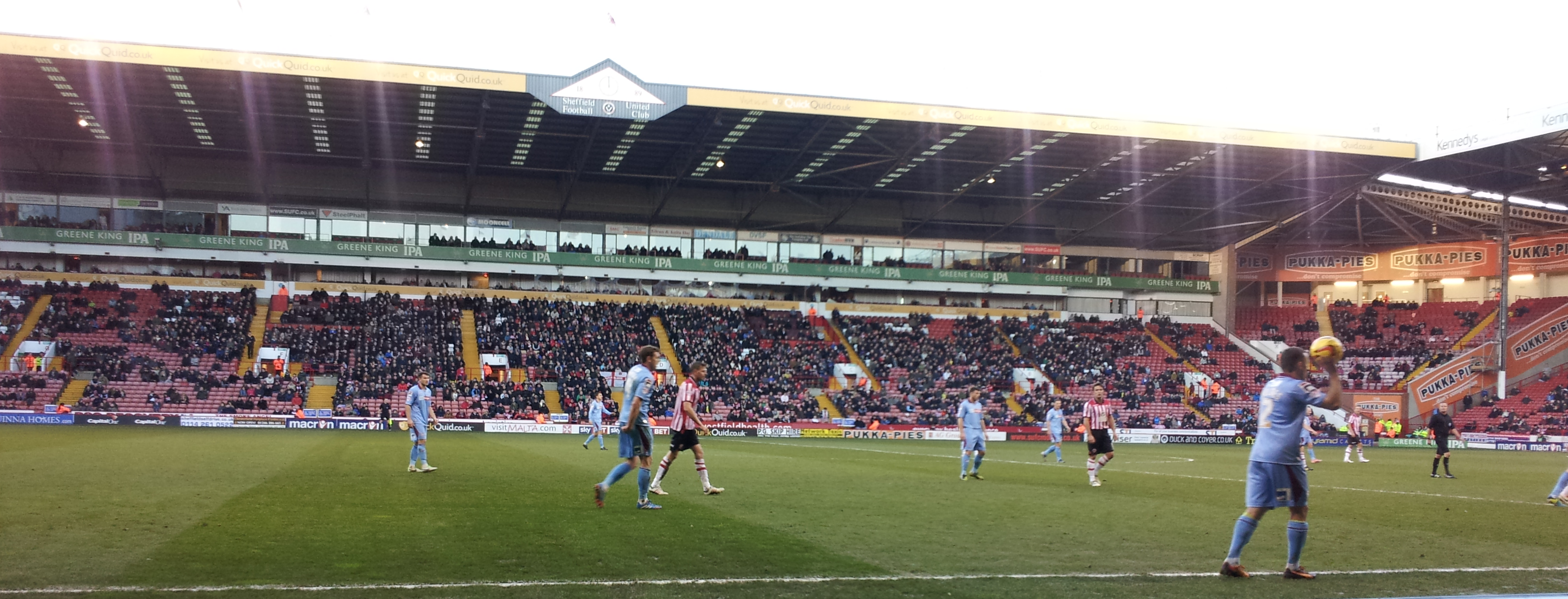
The Blades in their 3–1 home victory over Tranmere Rovers.

December started with the Blades progressing to the third round of the FA Cup with a 2–0 away win over Cambridge United thanks to goals from Jose Baxter and Jamie Murphy. With the academy leagues entering their winter breaks, United allowed a number of their academy prospects to undertake loans to local non-league sides over the Christmas period. In their next match, United recorded a 1–0 home victory against Swindon Town with Jose Baxter scoring his second goal in as many games. The club then announced further restructuring off the field, with Julian Winter leaving his position as chief executive, before being held to a draw on the field, in an away encounter with Stevenage. United entertained Oldham Athletic on Boxing Day and had to come from behind to register a 1–1 draw, before finishing the year with a 3–1 home victory over Tranmere Rovers.

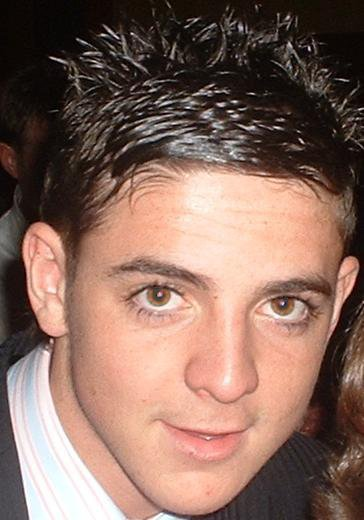
Bob Harris joined United in January.

With the winter transfer window due to open, United opted to allow striker Lyle Taylor to join Scottish Premiership side Partick Thistle for the remainder of the season. Taylor was quickly followed by fellow striker Marlon King whose short-term contract was terminated at the end of the year. Youngster Jahmal Smith joined Harrogate Town on a youth loan. Having picked up an injury during the game against Oldham, Aidan White cut short his loan spell to return to Leeds for treatment. United's unbeaten run did not last into the new year, as despite leading 1–0 at half time, they were beaten 2–1 away at Walsall. As January began Aaron Barry returned from a successful loan spell at Dumbarton having played over 20 times for the Sons, before United knocked Premiership side Aston Villa out of the FA Cup following a 2–1 third round at Villa Park. The following week saw a flurry of arrivals and departures as Elliott Whitehouse returned from his loan spell at York City, whilst Joe Ironside returned from Halifax, Callum McFadzean returned from Chesterfield and youngster Jahmal Smith joined Harrogate Town on a months loan. Conor Coady then extended his loan with United until the end of February, and Darryl Westlake extended his loan with Mansfield Town until the end of the season. The following day Malachy Brannigan was unveiled as the club's new managing director, reuniting with Nigel Clough, with whom he had worked at Derby County. The week concluded with United signing Billy Paynter on loan for the rest of the season from South Yorkshire rivals Doncaster Rovers, whilst Marcus Williams left permanently for Scunthorpe United on a free transfer, and Sean McGinty joined Northampton Town on a months loan. For the second league fixture in a row United let a lead slip to lose 2–1 at Notts County, and then as Nigel Clough continued to revamp the squad, Febian Brandy was allowed to rejoin Walsall on loan for the remainder of the season, only six months after leaving the West Midlands club, and Florent Cuvelier joined Port Vale for a similar period. In their next match, United drew 2–2 at home with Yorkshire rivals Bradford City despite having held a two-goal lead at half time. 24 January saw United make a number of signings, bringing in John Brayford on loan for the remainder of the season from Cardiff City, signing Stefan Scougall from Livingston for an undisclosed fee, and agreeing a loan-swap deal with Blackpool that saw Bob Harris sign for a month with United, with Tony McMahon moving in the opposite direction. In the fifth round of the FA Cup United held Premier League Fulham to a 1–1 draw at Bramall Lane, despite being reduced to ten men for most of the second half following Michael Doyle's red card. On 30 January, McMahon agreed a permanent switch to Blackpool, after the west-coast club decided to take up the remainder of his contract. The following day, in the final hours of the transfer window, United agreed a similar deal with Bob Harris, taking over the remainder of his contract from his former club.

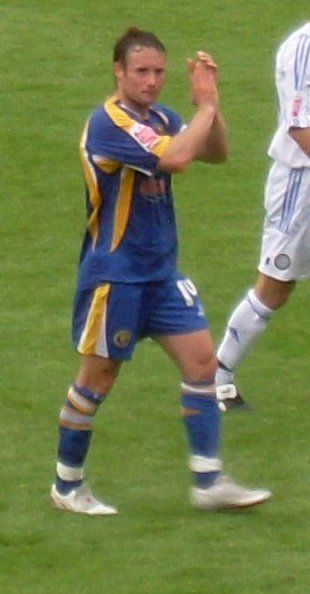
Ben Davies joined United on loan in February.

=== February and March: Climbing the table ===
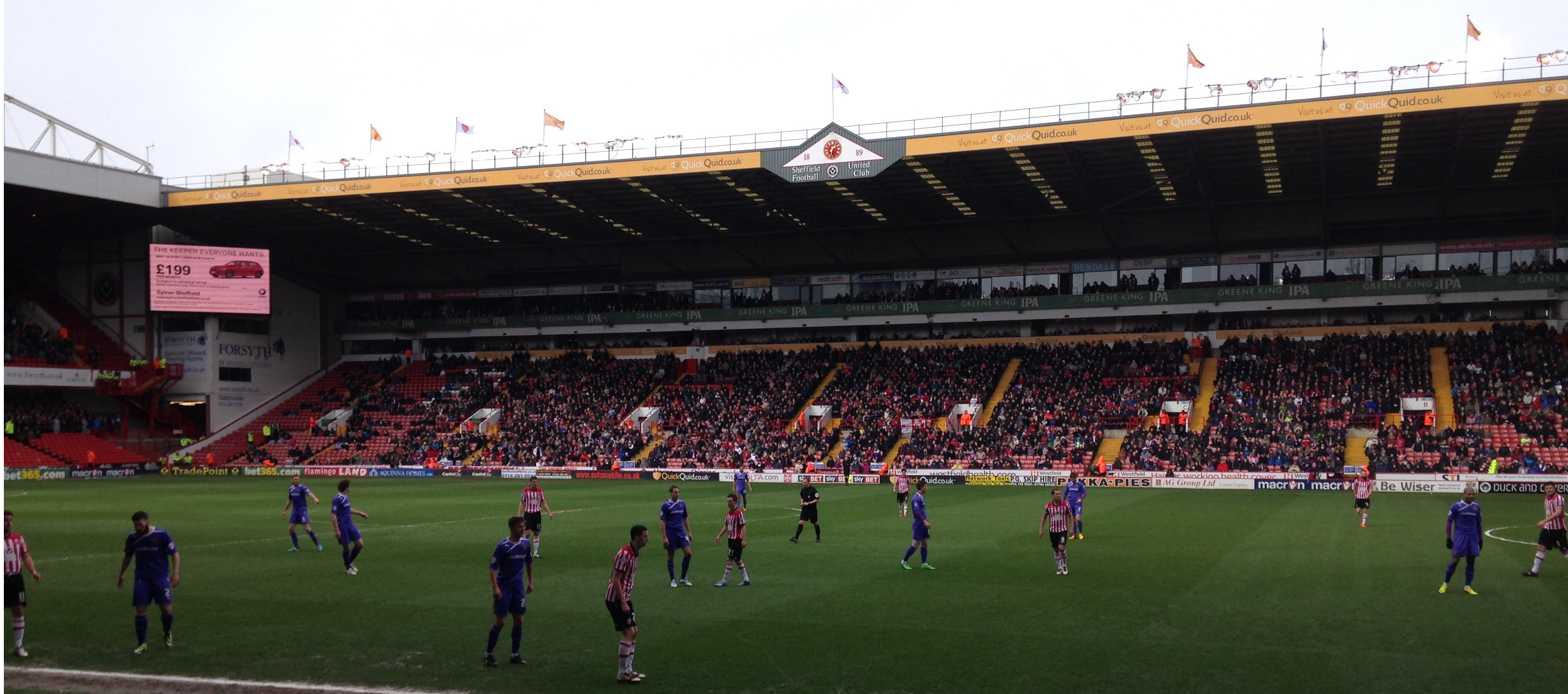
The Blades in their 2–0 home loss to Wolverhampton Wanderers.

With their scheduled mid-week league fixture called off due to a waterlogged pitch, the Blades next game was an away trip to Crewe Alexandra, where United's poor away form continued with a 3–0 defeat. United claimed another Premier League scalp in the FA Cup, thanks to a goal from Shaun Miller in the final minute of extra time, as the Blades recorded a 1–0 away victory over Fulham in their fourth round replay. Later that week Sean McGinty returned from his loan at Northampton Town, and Aaron Barry was allowed to leave United, and signed a permanent deal with Derry City in Northern Ireland. The following weekend saw United record a 2–0 home victory over fellow relegation strugglers Shrewsbury Town, marking their first league victory of the calendar year, with new signing Stefan Scougall scoring his first goal for the club. With the loan window re-opening, Joe Ironside joined Harrogate Town on a months loan, ahead of United's fifth-round FA Cup tie against Nottingham Forest, which saw them progress to the quarter-finals after a 3–1 home victory thanks to two goals in two minutes from late substitute Chris Porter. Nigel Clough continued to reshape his squad the following week by bringing in midfielder Ben Davies on loan from his former club Derby County on 19 February, with Davies agreeing to spend the remainder of the season at Bramall Lane. United finally began to climb the table, moving out of the relegation places, as they recorded back-to-back league wins, beating Gillingham 1–0 away from home, and then registering a comfortable 3–0 victory over Bristol City at Bramall Lane on 22 February. Academy product Jordan Hodder joined Buxton on a one-month youth loan to get some first team experience, and on 25 February Conor Coady had his loan deal extended until the end of the season. Later that evening, the Blades registered a 1–0 away victory over Colchester United, thanks to a late penalty from substitute Chris Porter.

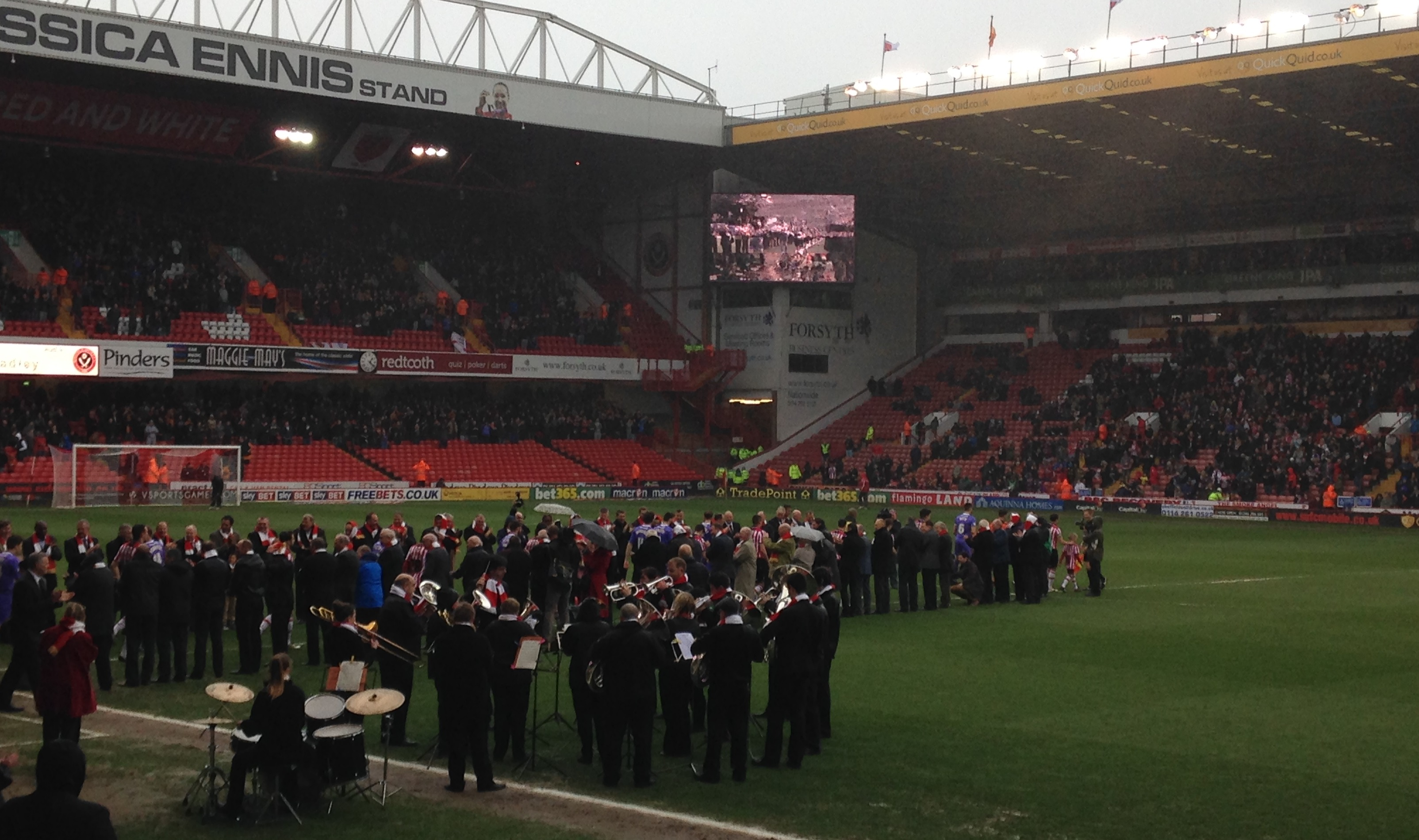
The 'Legends of the Lane' at Bramall Lane to celebrate Sheffield United's 125 Birthday.

March started in a similar fashion, with a 1–0 away win at MK Dons with Stefan Scougall scoring the only goal. This was followed by a 2–0 home victory over Peterborough United on 4 March with goals from Porter and Davies, his first for the club. Later that week, with a number of the squad having picked up injuries and a busy fixture list ahead, Kieron Freeman joined United on a one-month loan from Derby County to act as defensive cover, before Nigel Clough was named as the League One 'Manager of the Month' the following day. Returning to FA Cup action, United booked their place in the semi-finals at Wembley Stadium after they beat Charlton Athletic 2–0 at Bramall Lane on 9 March. United played their third home game in a row three days later, and a 1–0 scoreline was enough to condemn Carlisle United to a league defeat, meaning the Blades had registered their tenth straight win in all competitions. United's winning run was halted in the next match however, as they were held to a goalless draw away at Preston North End. On 21 March Callum McFadzean joined Burton Albion on a one-month loan, while striker Shaun Miller joined Shrewsbury Town a day later, agreeing a loan until the end of the season. United's next league fixture was a gala fixture as the club celebrated 125 years since its formation, although the party was soured as Wolverhampton Wanderers inflicted the club's first defeat in eleven matches, winning 2–0 at Bramall Lane. After Elliott Whitehouse was allowed to join Alfreton Town on loan, United returned to winning ways with a 2–0 away victory over Crawley Town thanks to two goals from Conor Coady. On the deadline for loan deals, Sean McGinty joined Rochdale for the remainder of the season. March's final fixture saw United lose at Swindon Town, with a late goal condemning them to a 2–1 defeat.

=== April and May: Wembley yet again but no promotion ===
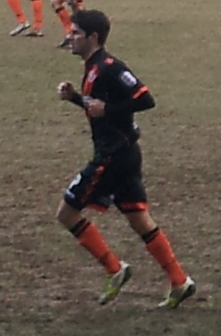
Ryan Flynn signed a new contract in May.

April started in controversial fashion as United played out a 0–0 draw with Brentford, as the referee initially sent off loanee Kieron Freeman and gave a penalty for a challenge in the area, only to rescind both decisions a few minutes later after consulting with the referee's assistant. United's next game also ended in a draw as they were held 1–1 at Bramall Lane by Leyton Orient, and with Kieron Freeman's loan deal due to expire, it was extended until the end of the season. With a visit to Wembley Stadium on the horizon, Blades were 1–0 victors in the South Yorkshire derby against Rotherham United at Bramall Lane on 8 April, despite fielding a largely reserve side, with Ben Davies converting a 90th-minute penalty. United's next fixture was an FA Cup semi-final appearance against Hull City where over 71,000 fans saw United twice take the lead in the first-half, only for them to get pegged back after the break and eventually lose 5–3 to their Premiership rivals. Back in league action, United then recorded a narrow home victory over bottom places Stevenage, with a single own goal being the difference between the sides. United's next game was an away fixture at Tranmere Rovers where the sides shared the points in a 0–0 draw, followed later the same week with a 2–1 away victory as United came from behind to beat Port Vale. With the season drawing to a close Harry Maguire was named in the PFA League One Team of the Season, before United registered a 1–1 away draw at Oldham Athletic on 29 April. As the club began to plan for the new season, Ryan Flynn agreed an extended deal, before the Blades rounded off the season with a 2–1 victory over Coventry City at Bramall Lane to end the season seventh in the table. Later in May, manager Nigel Clough was named FA Cup Manager of the Season by the League Managers Association in recognition of United's run to the semi-finals of the FA Cup.

== Squad ==
As of end of the season

Note: Flags indicate national team as defined under FIFA eligibility rules; some limited exceptions apply. Players may hold more than one non-FIFA nationality.

No.	Pos.	Nation	Player
1	GK	ENG	Mark Howard
3	DF	SCO	Bob Harris
4	DF	ENG	John Brayford (on loan from Cardiff City)
5	DF	ENG	Harry Maguire
6	DF	ENG	Matt Hill
7	MF	SCO	Ryan Flynn
8	MF	IRL	Michael Doyle (Captain)
9	FW	ENG	Chris Porter
11	MF	ENG	Jose Baxter
14	MF	SCO	Stephen McGinn
15	DF	SCO	Neill Collins
17	MF	ENG	Conor Coady (on loan from Liverpool)
18	FW	ENG	Billy Paynter (on loan from Doncaster Rovers)
21	MF	SCO	Stefan Scougall

No.	Pos.	Nation	Player
22	MF	ENG	Ben Davies (on loan from Derby County)
23	FW	SCO	Jamie Murphy
25	GK	ENG	George Long
28	DF	WAL	Kieron Freeman (on loan from Derby County)
29	MF	PAK	Otis Khan
30	DF	NIR	Jasper Johns
32	DF	ENG	Terry Kennedy
34	GK	ENG	George Willis
35	FW	WAL	Jake Eyre
36	FW	ITA	Diego De Girolamo
37	MF	ENG	Dominic Calvert-Lewin
38	MF	ENG	Louis Reed
42	MF	IRL	Connor Dimaio

=== Out on loan ===
Note: Flags indicate national team as defined under FIFA eligibility rules; some limited exceptions apply. Players may hold more than one non-FIFA nationality.

No.	Pos.	Nation	Player
2	DF	ENG	Darryl Westlake (on loan at Mansfield Town)
10	FW	MSR	Lyle Taylor (on loan at Partick Thistle)
12	FW	ENG	Shaun Miller (on loan at Shrewsbury Town)
16	MF	BEL	Florent Cuvelier (on loan at Port Vale)
19	FW	ENG	Febian Brandy (on loan at Walsall)
20	DF	IRL	Sean McGinty (on loan at Rochdale)

No.	Pos.	Nation	Player
24	FW	ENG	Joe Ironside (on loan at Harrogate Town)
26	MF	ENG	Callum McFadzean (on loan at Burton Albion)
27	MF	ENG	Elliott Whitehouse (on loan at Alfreton Town)
—	MF	ENG	Jordan Hodder (on loan at Buxton)
—	FW	ENG	Jahmal Smith (on loan at Harrogate Town)

=== Left before the end of the season ===
Note: Flags indicate national team as defined under FIFA eligibility rules; some limited exceptions apply. Players may hold more than one non-FIFA nationality.

No.	Pos.	Nation	Player
3	DF	ENG	Marcus Williams
4	MF	ENG	Ryan Hall (on loan from Leeds United)
4	DF	GIB	Danny Higginbotham
4	DF	IRL	Aidan White (on loan from Leeds United)
11	MF	SCO	Kevin McDonald

No.	Pos.	Nation	Player
18	FW	JAM	Marlon King
21	FW	ENG	Harry Bunn (on loan from Manchester City)
22	DF	SCO	Simon Lappin (on loan from Cardiff City)
29	DF	ENG	Tony McMahon
33	MF	IRL	Aaron Barry

== Transfers and contracts ==
=== In ===
==== Summer ====
Squad #	Position	Player	Transferred from	Fee	Date	Contract length	Source
19	FW	(England) Febian Brandy	(England) Walsall	Free	25 June 2013	2 years	
14	MF	(Scotland) Stephen McGinn	(England) Watford	Free	25 June 2013	2 years	
20	DF	(Republic of Ireland) Sean McGinty	(England) Manchester United	Free	25 June 2013	2 years	
30	DF	(Northern Ireland) Jasper Johns	(England) Everton	Free	25 June 2013	1 year	
10	FW	(Montserrat) Lyle Taylor	(Scotland) Falkirk	Undisclosed	17 July 2013	2 years	
11	MF	(England) Jose Baxter	(England) Oldham Athletic	Undisclosed	29 August 2013	3 years	
16	MF	(Belgium) Florent Cuvelier	(England) Stoke City	Undisclosed	2 September 2013	3 years	
18	FW	(Jamaica) Marlon King	(England) Birmingham City	Free	18 September 2013	1 years	

==== Winter ====
Squad #	Position	Player	Transferred from	Fee	Date	Contract length	Source
21	MF	(Scotland) Stefan Scougall	(Scotland) Livingston	Undisclosed	24 January 2014	3.5 years	
3	DF	(Scotland) Bob Harris	(England) Blackpool	Swap	31 January 2014	6 months	

==== Loan in ====
Squad #	Position	Player	Loaned from	Start	End	Source
17	MF	(England) Conor Coady	(England) Liverpool	22 July 2013	31 May 2014	
21	FW	(England) Harry Bunn	(England) Manchester City	2 September 2013	28 November 2013	
4	FW	(England) Ryan Hall	(England) Leeds United	20 September 2013	21 October 2013	
22	DF	(Scotland) Simon Lappin	(Wales) Cardiff City	4 October 2013	4 December 2013	
4	DF	(Republic of Ireland) Aidan White	(England) Leeds United	29 October 2013	27 December 2013	
18	FW	(England) Billy Paynter	(England) Doncaster Rovers	10 January 2014	10 May 2014	
4	DF	(England) John Brayford	(Wales) Cardiff City	24 January 2014		
3	DF	(Scotland) Bob Harris	(England) Blackpool	24 January 2014	31 January 2014	
22	MF	(England) Ben Davies	(England) Derby County	19 February 2014	31 May 2014	
28	DF	(Wales) Kieron Freeman	(England) Derby County	6 March 2014		

=== Out ===
==== Summer ====
Squad #	Position	Player	Transferred to	Fee	Date	Source
19	MF	(Scotland) Barry Robson	(Scotland) Aberdeen	Free	1 July 2013	
35	GK	(Wales) Danny Coyne	(England) Shrewsbury Town	Released	1 July 2013	
18	MF	(Republic of Ireland) Matthew Harriott	(England) Northampton Town	Released	1 July 2013	
3	DF	(Haiti) Lecsinel Jean-François		Released	1 July 2013	
14	FW	(England) Dave Kitson	(England) Oxford United	Free	1 July 2013	
21	FW	(England) Jordan Chapell	(England) Torquay United	Free	9 July 2013	
17	FW	(England) Richard Cresswell	(England) York City	Free	16 July 2013	
–	FW	(Norway) Erik Tønne	(Norway) Sandnes Ulf	Free	8 August 2013	
11	MF	(Scotland) Kevin McDonald	(England) Wolverhampton Wanderers	Undisclosed	14 August 2013	
4	DF	(Gibraltar) Danny Higginbotham	(England) Chester	Free	29 August 2013	

==== Winter ====
Squad #	Position	Player	Transferred to	Fee	Date	Source
18	FW	(Jamaica) Marlon King	Released	N/A	31 December 2013	
3	DF	(England) Marcus Williams	(England) Scunthorpe United	Free	10 January 2014	
29	DF	(England) Tony McMahon	(England) Blackpool	Swap	30 January 2014	
33	DF	(Republic of Ireland) Aaron Barry	(Northern Ireland) Derry City	Free	6 February 2014	

==== Loan out ====
Squad #	Position	Player	Loaned to	Start	End	Source
–	FW	(Norway) Erik Tønne	(Norway) HamKam	3 April 2013	8 August 2013	
33	DF	(Republic of Ireland) Aaron Barry	(Scotland) Dumbarton	1 August 2013	3 January 2014	
27	MF	(England) Elliott Whitehouse	(England) York City	12 September 2013	5 January 2014	
9	FW	(England) Chris Porter	(England) Chesterfield	4 October 2013	2 November 2013	
24	FW	(England) Joe Ironside	(England) FC Halifax Town	12 November 2013	5 January 2014	
26	MF	(England) Callum McFadzean	(England) Chesterfield	22 November 2013	3 January 2014	
2	DF	(England) Darryl Westlake	(England) Mansfield Town	28 November 2013	30 June 2014	
3	DF	(England) Marcus Williams	(England) Scunthorpe United	28 November 2013	1 January 2014	
10	FW	(England) Lyle Taylor	(Scotland) Partick Thistle	1 January 2014		
–	FW	(England) Jahmal Smith	(England) Harrogate Town	3 January 2014		
22	DF	(Republic of Ireland) Sean McGinty	(England) Northampton Town	10 January 2014	5 February 2014	
19	MF	(England) Febian Brandy	(England) Walsall	14 January 2014		
16	MF	(Belgium) Florent Cuvelier	(England) Port Vale	16 January 2014		
29	DF	(England) Tony McMahon	(England) Blackpool	24 January 2014	30 January 2014	
24	FW	(England) Joe Ironside	(England) Harrogate Town	11 February 2014		
–	MF	(England) Jordan Hodder	(England) Buxton	22 February 2014		
26	MF	(England) Callum McFadzean	(England) Burton Albion	21 March 2014		
12	FW	(England) Shaun Miller	(England) Shrewsbury Town	22 March 2014		
27	MF	(England) Elliott Whitehouse	(England) Alfreton Town	24 March 2014		
22	DF	(Republic of Ireland) Sean McGinty	(England) Rochdale	27 March 2014		

=== Contracts ===
New contracts and contract extensions.

Player	Date	Length	Contracted until	Reference / Notes
(Republic of Ireland) Aaron Barry	18 June 2013	1 Year	Summer 2014	
(England) Jordan Chapell	18 June 2013	1 Year	Summer 2014	
(Gibraltar) Danny Higginbotham	18 June 2013	1 Year	Summer 2014	
(England) Jordan Hodder	18 June 2013	1 Year	Summer 2014	
(England) Terry Kennedy	18 June 2013	1 Year	Summer 2014	
(England) Callum McFadzean	18 June 2013	1 Year	Summer 2014	
(England) Jahmal Smith	18 June 2013	1 Year	Summer 2014	
(England) Elliott Whitehouse	18 June 2013	1 Year	Summer 2014	
(Scotland) Ryan Flynn	2 May 2014	2 Year	Summer 2016	

== League table ==
Pos	Team	Pld	W	D	L	GF	GA	GD	Pts	Promotion, qualification or relegation
5	Preston North End	46	23	16	7	72	46	+26	85	Qualification for League One play-offs (Note: Four teams play for one spot and promotion to Football League Championship.)
6	Peterborough United	46	23	5	18	72	58	+14	74	Qualification for League One play-offs
7	Sheffield United	46	18	13	15	48	46	+2	67	
8	Swindon Town	46	19	9	18	63	59	+4	66	
9	Port Vale	46	18	7	21	59	73	−14	61	

Updated to match(es) played on 3 May 2014. Source: BBC Sport
Rules for classification: 1) Points; 2) Goal difference; 3) Number of goals scored

== Season firsts ==
=== Player début ===
Players making their first team Sheffield United début in a fully competitive match.

Squad #	Position	Player	Date	Opponents	Ground	Notes
10	FW	(England) Lyle Taylor	2 August 2013	Notts County	Bramall Lane	Sub
14	MF	(Scotland) Stephen McGinn	2 August 2013	Notts County	Bramall Lane	
17	MF	(England) Conor Coady	2 August 2013	Notts County	Bramall Lane	Sub
19	MF	(England) Febian Brandy	2 August 2013	Notts County	Bramall Lane	
20	DF	(Republic of Ireland) Sean McGinty	17 August 2013	Colchester United	Bramall Lane	
30	DF	(Northern Ireland) Jasper Johns	17 August 2013	Colchester United	Bramall Lane	Sub
11	MF	(England) Jose Baxter	31 August 2013	Milton Keynes Dons	Bramall Lane	
16	MF	(Belgium) Florent Cuvelier	3 September 2013	Scunthorpe United	Glanford Park	Football League Trophy
21	FW	(England) Harry Bunn	7 September 2013	Rotherham United	New York Stadium	Sub
4	FW	(England) Ryan Hall	21 September 2013	Preston North End	Bramall Lane	
18	FW	(Jamaica) Marlon King	21 September 2013	Preston North End	Bramall Lane	
22	DF	(Scotland) Simon Lappin	4 October 2013	Crawley Town	Bramall Lane	
4	DF	(Republic of Ireland) Aidan White	2 November 2013	Shrewsbury Town	New Meadow	
18	FW	(England) Billy Paynter	11 January 2014	Notts County	Meadow Lane	Sub
4	DF	(England) John Brayford	26 January 2014	Fulham	Bramall Lane	FA Cup
3	DF	(Scotland) Bob Harris	26 January 2014	Fulham	Bramall Lane	FA Cup, Sub
21	MF	(Scotland) Stefan Scougall	26 January 2014	Fulham	Bramall Lane	FA Cup, Sub
22	MF	(England) Ben Davies	19 February 2014	Gillingham	Priestfield Stadium	Sub
28	DF	(Wales) Kieron Freeman	12 March 2014	Carlisle United	Bramall Lane	Sub
29	MF	(Pakistan) Otis Khan	25 March 2014	Crawley Town	Broadfield Stadium	Sub
42	MF	(Republic of Ireland) Connor Dimaio	25 March 2014	Crawley Town	Broadfield Stadium	Sub
38	MF	(England) Louis Reed	8 April 2014	Rotherham United	Bramall Lane	Sub

=== Début goal ===
Players scoring their first goal for Sheffield United in a competitive fixture.

Squad #	Position	Player	Date	Opponents	Ground	Notes
11	FW	(England) Jose Baxter	7 September 2013	Rotherham United	New York Stadium	
18	FW	(Jamaica) Marlon King	4 October 2013	Crawley Town	Bramall Lane	
10	FW	(England) Lyle Taylor	13 October 2013	Coventry City	Sixfields Stadium (Northampton)	
17	MF	(England) Conor Coady	30 November 2013	Leyton Orient	Matchroom Stadium	
21	MF	(Scotland) Stefan Scougall	8 February 2014	Shrewsbury Town	Bramall Lane	
3	DF	(England) John Brayford	22 February 2014	Bristol City	Bramall Lane	
22	MF	(England) Ben Davies	4 March 2014	Peterborough United	Bramall Lane	

=== Stadia ===
First ever visit to a stadium for a competitive fixture

Venue	Opposition	Date	Result	Score	Notes
New York Stadium	Rotherham United	7 September 2013	Loss	3–1	
Sixfields Stadium (Northampton)	Coventry City	13 October 2013	Loss	3–2	

== Squad statistics ==
=== Appearances and goals ===
As of 3 May 2014

No.	Pos	Nat	Player	Total		League One		FA Cup		League Cup		FL Trophy	
No.	Pos	Nat	Player	Apps	Goals	Apps	Goals	Apps	Goals	Apps	Goals	Apps	Goals
1	GK	(England) ENG	Mark Howard	26	0	19	0	4	0	1	0	2	0
2	DF	(England) ENG	Darryl Westlake	10	0	4+3	0	0	0	1	0	2	0
3	DF	(Scotland) SCO	Bob Harris	16	0	9+2	0	4+1	0	0	0	0	0
4	DF	(England) ENG	John Brayford	20	2	15	1	5	1	0	0	0	0
5	DF	(England) ENG	Harry Maguire	52	6	41	5	8	1	1	0	2	0
6	DF	(England) ENG	Matt Hill	39	0	24+8	0	4+3	0	0	0	0	0
7	MF	(Scotland) SCO	Ryan Flynn	40	8	28+3	6	6+1	2	1	0	1	0
8	MF	(Republic of Ireland) IRL	Michael Doyle	51	3	41+1	2	7	0	1	1	1	0
9	FW	(England) ENG	Chris Porter	42	11	16+17	7	5+3	4	1	0	0	0
10	FW	(England) ENG	Lyle Taylor	25	2	9+11	2	0+2	0	0+1	0	1+1	0
11	FW	(England) ENG	Jose Baxter	45	8	29+6	6	6+2	2	0	0	1+1	0
12	FW	(England) ENG	Shaun Miller	16	1	5+8	0	1+2	1	0	0	0	0
14	MF	(Scotland) SCO	Stephen McGinn	39	0	23+8	0	4+3	0	0	0	1	0
15	DF	(Scotland) SCO	Neill Collins	55	2	44	2	8	0	1	0	2	0
16	MF	(Belgium) BEL	Florent Cuvelier	8	0	5+2	0	0	0	0	0	1	0
17	MF	(England) ENG	Conor Coady	50	6	32+7	5	7+1	1	1	0	2	0
18	FW	(England) ENG	Billy Paynter	13	0	6+7	0	0	0	0	0	0	0
19	FW	(England) ENG	Febian Brandy	15	0	10+4	0	0	0	0+1	0	0	0
20	DF	(Republic of Ireland) IRL	Sean McGinty	3	0	2	0	0	0	0	0	0+1	0
21	MF	(Scotland) SCO	Stefan Scougall	20	3	13+2	2	4+1	1	0	0	0	0
22	MF	(England) ENG	Ben Davies	20	3	8+10	3	0+2	0	0	0	0	0
23	FW	(Scotland) SCO	Jamie Murphy	42	7	25+9	4	6+1	3	0	0	1	0
24	FW	(England) ENG	Joe Ironside	5	0	1+3	0	0	0	0	0	1	0
25	GK	(England) ENG	George Long	31	0	27	0	4	0	0	0	0	0
26	MF	(England) ENG	Callum McFadzean	9	0	3+4	0	0	0	1	0	1	0
27	MF	(England) ENG	Elliott Whitehouse	0	0	0	0	0	0	0	0	0	0
28	DF	(Wales) WAL	Kieron Freeman	12	0	10+2	0	0	0	0	0	0	0
29	MF	(Pakistan) PAK	Otis Khan	2	0	0+2	0	0	0	0	0	0	0
30	DF	(Northern Ireland) NIR	Jasper Johns	1	0	0+1	0	0	0	0	0	0	0
32	DF	(England) ENG	Terry Kennedy	6	0	3+2	0	0+1	0	0	0	0	0
34	GK	(England) ENG	George Willis	0	0	0	0	0	0	0	0	0	0
35	FW	(Wales) WAL	Jake Eyre	0	0	0	0	0	0	0	0	0	0
36	FW	(Italy) ITA	Diego De Girolamo	0	0	0	0	0	0	0	0	0	0
37	MF	(England) ENG	Dominic Calvert-Lewin	0	0	0	0	0	0	0	0	0	0
38	MF	(England) ENG	Louis Reed	1	0	0+1	0	0	0	0	0	0	0
42	MF	(Republic of Ireland) IRL	Connor Dimaio	3	0	2+1	0	0	0	0	0	0	0
Players who left before the end of the season:
3	DF	(England) ENG	Marcus Williams	3	0	2	0	0	0	1	0	0	0
4	FW	(England) ENG	Ryan Hall	5	0	3+1	0	0	0	0	0	0+1	0
4	DF	(Gibraltar) GIB	Danny Higginbotham	0	0	0	0	0	0	0	0	0	0
4	DF	(Republic of Ireland) IRL	Aidan White	8	0	8	0	0	0	0	0	0	0
11	MF	(Scotland) SCO	Kevin McDonald	2	1	1	1	0	0	1	0	0	0
18	FW	(Jamaica) JAM	Marlon King	9	1	7+1	1	0	0	0	0	1	0
21	FW	(England) ENG	Harry Bunn	2	0	0+2	0	0	0	0	0	0	0
22	DF	(Scotland) SCO	Simon Lappin	12	0	7+2	0	2	0	0	0	1	0
29	DF	(England) ENG	Tony McMahon	26	0	23	0	2	0	0	0	1	0
33	DF	(Republic of Ireland) IRL	Aaron Barry	0	0	0	0	0	0	0	0	0	0

=== Top scorers ===
Place	Number	Nation	Position	Name	League One	FA Cup	League Cup	FL Trophy	Total
1	9	(England)	FW	Chris Porter	7	4	0	0	11
2	11	(England)	FW	Jose Baxter	6	2	0	0	8
3	7	(Scotland)	MF	Ryan Flynn	5	2	0	0	7
3	23	(Scotland)	MF	Jamie Murphy	4	3	0	0	7
4	17	(England)	MF	Conor Coady	5	1	0	0	6
4	5	(England)	DF	Harry Maguire	5	1	0	0	6
5	22	(England)	MF	Ben Davies	3	0	0	0	3
5	8	(Republic of Ireland)	MF	Michael Doyle	2	0	1	0	3
5	21	(Scotland)	MF	Stefan Scougall	2	1	0	0	3
6	4	(England)	DF	John Brayford	1	1	0	0	2
6	15	(Scotland)	DF	Neill Collins	2	0	0	0	2
6	10	(England)	FW	Lyle Taylor	2	0	0	0	2
7	18	(Jamaica)	FW	Marlon King	1	0	0	0	1
7	11	(Scotland)	MF	Kevin McDonald	1	0	0	0	1
7	12	(England)	FW	Shaun Miller	0	1	0	0	1
Total					45	16	1	0	61

United also benefited from three own goals, one in the Football League and one in the FA Cup.

=== Clean sheets ===
As of 18 April 2014

Rank	Pos	No.	Nat	Name	League One	FA Cup	League Cup	FLT	Total
1	GK	1	(England)	Mark Howard	12	2	0	1	15
2	GK	23	(England)	George Long	5	1	0	0	6
Total					17	3	0	1	21

=== Penalties ===
Penalties Awarded
Date	Penalty Taker	Goalkeeper	Opponent	Scored?	Competition
9 Nov 2013	(England) Chris Porter	(England) Sam Walker	Colchester United	✓	FA Cup
26 Nov 2013	(England) Chris Porter	(England) Richard O'Donnell	Walsall	✓	League One
16 Feb 2014	(England) Chris Porter	(Netherlands) Dorus de Vries	Nottingham Forest	✓	FA Cup
22 Feb 2014	(England) Jose Baxter	(England) Simon Moore	Bristol City	✓	League One
25 Feb 2014	(England) Chris Porter	(England) Sam Walker	Colchester United	✓	League One
8 Apr 2014	(England) Ben Davies	(England) Adam Collin	Rotherham United	✓	League One

Penalties Conceded
Date	Penalty Taker	Goalkeeper	Opponent	Scored?	Competition
7 Sep 2013	(Wales) Daniel Nardiello	(England) Mark Howard	Rotherham United	✓	League One
1 Jan 2014	(England) Craig Westcarr	(England) George Long	Walsall	✓	League One

=== Disciplinary record ===
Number	Nation	Position	Name	League One		FA Cup		League Cup		FL Trophy		Total	
Number	Nation	Position	Name	Yellow card	Red card	Yellow card	Red card	Yellow card	Red card	Yellow card	Red card	Yellow card	Red card
5	(England)	DF	Harry Maguire	12	0	1	0	0	0	0	0	13	0
8	(Republic of Ireland)	MF	Michael Doyle	6	0	0	1	0	0	0	0	6	1
19	(England)	MF	Febian Brandy	2	2	0	0	0	0	0	0	2	2
29	(England)	DF	Tony McMahon	8	0	0	0	0	0	0	0	8	0
15	(Scotland)	DF	Neill Collins	3	0	2	0	0	0	0	0	5	0
11	(England)	FW	Jose Baxter	2	0	1	0	0	0	1	0	4	0
17	(England)	MF	Conor Coady	4	0	0	0	0	0	0	0	4	0
22	(England)	MF	Ben Davies	3	0	0	0	0	0	0	0	3	0
7	(Scotland)	MF	Ryan Flynn	2	0	1	0	0	0	0	0	3	0
3	(Scotland)	DF	Bob Harris	1	0	2	0	0	0	0	0	3	0
12	(England)	MF	Shaun Miller	2	0	1	0	0	0	0	0	3	0
6	(England)	DF	Matt Hill	2	0	0	0	0	0	0	0	2	0
14	(Scotland)	MF	Stephen McGinn	2	0	0	0	0	0	0	0	2	0
21	(England)	FW	Harry Bunn	1	0	0	0	0	0	0	0	1	0
28	(Wales)	DF	Keiron Freeman	1	0	0	0	0	0	0	0	1	0
30	(Northern Ireland)	MF	Jasper Johns	1	0	0	0	0	0	0	0	1	0
30	(England)	GK	George Long	0	0	1	0	0	0	0	0	1	0
26	(England)	MF	Callum McFadzean	1	0	0	0	0	0	0	0	1	0
18	(England)	FW	Billy Paynter	1	0	0	0	0	0	0	0	1	0
21	(Scotland)	MF	Stefan Scougall	1	0	0	0	0	0	0	0	1	0
10	(England)	FW	Lyle Taylor	0	0	0	0	0	0	1	0	1	0
2	(England)	DF	Darryl Westlake	1	0	0	0	0	0	0	0	1	0
3	(England)	DF	Marcus Williams	1	0	0	0	0	0	0	0	1	0
Total				56	2	10	1	0	0	2	0	68	3

=== International Call-ups ===
No.	P	Name	Squad	Competition	Opposition	Date	Cap	Goals	Notes
25	GK	George Long	England U20	2013 FIFA U-20 World Cup	Iraq U20	23 June 2013	N	—	
25	GK	George Long	England U20	2013 FIFA U-20 World Cup	Chile U20	26 June 2013	N	—	
25	GK	George Long	England U20	2013 FIFA U-20 World Cup	Egypt U20	29 June 2013	N	—	
30	DF	Jasper Johns	Northern Ireland U19	Friendly	Scotland U19	13 August 2013	N	—	
—	MF	Jamie McDonagh	Northern Ireland U19	Friendly	Scotland U19	13 August 2013	Y	0	
25	GK	George Long	England U21	Friendly	Scotland U21	13 August 2013	N	—	
20	DF	Sean McGinty	(Republic of Ireland) Ireland U21	2015 U-21 Euro Qualifier G6	Faroe Islands U21	14 August 2013	Y	0	
42	MF	Connor Dimaio	(Republic of Ireland) Ireland U19	Friendly	Norway U19	13 August 2013	N	—	
42	MF	Connor Dimaio	(Republic of Ireland) Ireland U19	Friendly	Norway U19	15 August 2013	Y	0	
—	DF	Ioan Evans	Wales U17	Friendly	Malta U17	20 August 2013	Y	1	
—	DF	Ioan Evans	Wales U17	Friendly	Malta U17	22 August 2013	N	—	
25	GK	George Long	England U21	2015 U-21 Euro Qualifiers G1	Moldova U21	5 September 2013	N	—	
25	GK	George Long	England U21	2015 U-21 Euro Qualifiers G1	Finland U21	9 September 2013	N	—	
20	DF	Sean McGinty	(Republic of Ireland) Ireland U21	2015 U-21 Euro Qualifier G6	Germany U21	9 September 2013	Y	0	
30	DF	Jasper Johns	Northern Ireland U19	Friendly	Austria U19	11 September 2013	N	—	
—	DF	Ioan Evans	Wales U17	UEFA U-17 Championship	Scotland U17	23 September 2013	Y	0	
—	DF	Ioan Evans	Wales U17	UEFA U-17 Championship	Hungary U17	25 September 2013	Y	0	
—	DF	Ioan Evans	Wales U17	UEFA U-17 Championship	Slovenia U17	28 September 2013	Y	0	
25	GK	George Long	England U21	2015 U-21 Euro Qualifiers G1	San Marino U21	10 October 2013	N	—	
25	GK	George Long	England U21	2015 U-21 Euro Qualifiers G1	Lithuania U21	15 October 2013	N	—	
20	DF	Sean McGinty	(Republic of Ireland) Ireland U21	2015 U-21 Euro Qualifier G6	Romania U21	11 October 2013	Y	0	
20	DF	Sean McGinty	(Republic of Ireland) Ireland U21	2015 U-21 Euro Qualifier G6	Romania U21	15 October 2013	Y	0	
18	FW	Marlon King	Jamaica	2014 WC Qualifier CONCACAF 4th round	Honduras	15 October 2013	N	—	
25	GK	George Long	England U21	2015 U-21 Euro Qualifiers G1	Finland U21	14 November 2013	N	—	
25	GK	George Long	England U21	2015 U-21 Euro Qualifiers G1	San Marino U21	19 November 2013	N	–	
20	DF	Sean McGinty	(Republic of Ireland) Ireland U21	2015 U-21 Euro Qualifier G6	Faroe Islands U21	15 November 2013	Y	0	
20	DF	Sean McGinty	(Republic of Ireland) Ireland U21	2015 U-21 Euro Qualifier G6	Montenegro U21	19 November 2013	Y	0	
20	DF	Sean McGinty	(Republic of Ireland) Ireland U21	2015 U-21 Euro Qualifier G6	Montenegro U21	5 March 2014	Y	0	
42	MF	Connor Dimaio	(Republic of Ireland) Ireland U19	Friendly	Romania U19	1 March 2014	Y	0	
42	MF	Connor Dimaio	(Republic of Ireland) Ireland U19	Friendly	Romania U19	6 March 2014	Y	0	
36	FW	Diego De Girolamo	Italy U19	Friendly	Germany U19	5 March 2014	Y	1	
—	DF	Ioan Evans	Wales U17	2014 UEFA U-17 Elite Round	Switzerland U17	26 March 2014	Y	0	
—	DF	Ioan Evans	Wales U17	2014 UEFA U-17 Elite Round	Spain U17	28 March 2014	Y	0	
—	DF	Ioan Evans	Wales U17	2014 UEFA U-17 Elite Round	Russia U17	31 March 2014	Y	0	
42	MF	Connor Dimaio	(Republic of Ireland) Ireland U19	Friendly	Mexico U20	13 May 2014	Y	0	
42	MF	Connor Dimaio	(Republic of Ireland) Ireland U19	Friendly	Mexico U20	15 May 2014	Y	0	
21	MF	Stefan Scougall	Scotland U21	2015 U-21 Euro Qualifier G3	Netherlands U21	28 May 2014	Y	0	

== Matches ==
=== Key ===
Win Draw Loss

=== Football League One ===
2 August 2013	Sheffield United	2–1	Notts County	Bramall Lane
19:45	McDonald 30'; Maguire 67'	(Report)	Liddle (red card) 13'; Showunmi 59'	Attendance: 17,944

10 August 2013	Brentford	3–1	Sheffield United	Griffin Park
15:00	Forshaw 35'; Grigg 63', 76'	(Report)	Collins 57'	Attendance: 7,316

17 August 2013	Sheffield United	1–1	Colchester United	Bramall Lane
15:00	Maguire 45'	(Report)	Sears 25'	Attendance: 17,167

24 August 2013	Bradford City	2–0	Sheffield United	Valley Parade
15:00	Wells 45', 87'	(Report)		Attendance: 18,041

31 August 2013	Sheffield United	0–1	MK Dons	Bramall Lane
15:00		(Report)	Kay 87'	Attendance: 15,080

7 September 2013	Rotherham United	3–1	Sheffield United	New York Stadium
15:00	Agard 51'; Nardiello 72' (pen.); Milsom 75'	(Report)	Baxter 37'	Attendance: 11,758

14 September 2013	Carlisle United	1–0	Sheffield United	Brunton Park
15:00	Robson 54'	(Report)		Attendance: 4,863

21 September 2013	Sheffield United	0–1	Preston North End	Bramall Lane
15:00		(Report)	Beavon 68'	Attendance: 16,319

28 September 2013	Wolverhampton Wanderers	2–0	Sheffield United	Molineux Stadium
15:00	Griffiths 66'; Sako 90+1'	(Report)		Attendance: 20,417

4 October 2013	Sheffield United	1–1	Crawley Town	Bramall Lane
19:45	King 63'	(Report)	Proctor 10'	Attendance: 15,401

13 October 2013	Coventry City	3–2	Sheffield United	Sixfields Stadium, Northampton
16:00	Clarke 6', 49'; Wilson 32'	(Report)	Taylor 62', 80'	Attendance: 2,078

19 October 2013	Sheffield United	2–1	Port Vale	Bramall Lane
15:00	Collins 12'; Doyle 75'	(Report)	Jones (yellow card) 19' (yellow-red card); Yates 45'	Attendance: 18,545

22 October 2013	Peterborough United	0–0	Sheffield United	London Road Stadium
19:30		(Report)		Attendance: 6,435

26 October 2013	Sheffield United	3–1	Crewe Alexandra	Bramall Lane
15:00	Maguire 18', 29'; Flynn 55'	(Report)	Clayton 77'	Attendance: 18,784

2 November 2013	Shrewsbury Town	2–0	Sheffield United	Greenhous Meadow
15:00	Jacobson 39'; McAlinden 80'	(Report)	Brandy (red card) 57'	Attendance: 6,226

16 November 2013	Sheffield United	1–2	Gillingham	Bramall Lane
15:00	Porter 19'	(Report)	Kedwell 7'; McDonald 47'	Attendance: 16,560

23 November 2013	Bristol City	0–1	Sheffield United	Ashton Gate
15:00		(Report)	Flint 78' (o.g.)	Attendance: 13,220

26 November 2013	Sheffield United	1–1	Walsall	Bramall Lane
19:45	Porter 45+2' (pen.)	(Report)	Westcarr 47'	Attendance: 14,796

30 November 2013	Leyton Orient	1–1	Sheffield United	Matchroom Stadium
15:00	Cox 82'	(Report)	Coady 67'	Attendance: 6,586

14 December 2013	Sheffield United	1–0	Swindon Town	Bramall Lane
15:00	Baxter 67'	(Report)		Attendance: 15,430

21 December 2013	Stevenage	0–0	Sheffield United	Broadhall Way
15:00		(Report)		Attendance: 3,003

26 December 2013	Sheffield United	1–1	Oldham Athletic	Bramall Lane
15:00	Baxter 54'	(Report)	Clarke-Harris 6'	Attendance: 19,551

29 December 2013	Sheffield United	3–1	Tranmere Rovers	Bramall Lane
15:00	Murphy 9'; Baxter 56'; Flynn 67'	(Report)	Taylor 85'	Attendance: 17,460

1 January 2014	Walsall	2–1	Sheffield United	Bank's Stadium
15:00	Westcarr 52' (pen.); Chambers 62'	(Report)	Porter 17'	Attendance: 5,015

11 January 2014	Notts County	2–1	Sheffield United	Meadow Lane
15:00	Showunmi 26'; Fotheringham 68'	(Report)	Coady 2'	Attendance: 8,564

18 January 2014	Sheffield United	2–2	Bradford City	Bramall Lane
15:00	Murphy 8'; Maguire 40'	(Report)	Jones 56'; Hanson 63'	Attendance: 18,794

1 February 2014	Crewe Alexandra	3–0	Sheffield United	Alexandra Stadium
15:00	Aneke 37', 45'; Moore 90+4'	(Report)		Attendance: 5,437

8 February 2014	Sheffield United	2–0	Shrewsbury Town	Bramall Lane
15:00	Flynn 11'; Scougall 17'	(Report)		Attendance: 15,987

19 February 2014	Gillingham	0–1	Sheffield United	Priestfield Stadium
19:45		(Report)	Coady 41'	Attendance: 5,766

22 February 2014	Sheffield United	3–0	Bristol City	Bramall Lane
15:00	Brayford 43'; Flynn 58'; Baxter 70' (pen.)	(Report)		Attendance: 19,271

25 February 2014	Colchester United	0–1	Sheffield United	Colchester Community Stadium
19:45		[(Report)]	Porter 87' (pen.)	Attendance: 3,088

1 March 2014	MK Dons	0–1	Sheffield United	Stadium mk
15:00		(Report)	Scougall 23'	Attendance: 9,192

4 March 2014	Sheffield United	2–0	Peterborough United	Bramall Lane
19:30	Davies 47'; Porter 88'	(Report)		Attendance: 16,051

11 March 2014	Sheffield United	1–0	Carlisle United	Bramall Lane
19:45	Baxter 28'	(Report)		Attendance: 15,437

17 March 2014	Preston North End	0–0	Sheffield United	Deepdale
15:00		(Report)		Attendance: 8,892

22 March 2014	Sheffield United	0–2	Wolverhampton Wanderers	Bramall Lane
13:25		(Report)	Henry 13'; Edwards 53'	Attendance: 21,659

25 March 2014	Crawley Town	0–2	Sheffield United	Broadfield Stadium
19:45		(Report)	Coady 19', 63'	Attendance: 3,622

29 March 2014	Swindon Town	2–1	Sheffield United	County Ground
15:15	Miles Storey 18'; Thompson 90'	(Report)	Doyle 59'	Attendance: 8,441

1 April 2014	Sheffield United	0–0	Brentford	Bramall Lane
19:45		(Report)		Attendance: 15,730

5 April 2014	Sheffield United	1–1	Leyton Orient	Bramall Lane
15:00	Murphy 63'	(Report)	Cox 41'	Attendance: 16,809

8 April 2014	Sheffield United	1–0	Rotherham United	Bramall Lane
19:45	Davies 90' (pen.)	(Report)		Attendance: 21,529

18 April 2014	Sheffield United	1–0	Stevenage	Bramall Lane
19:45	Mousinho 10' (o.g.)	(Report)		Attendance: 17,629

21 April 2014	Tranmere Rovers	0–0	Sheffield United	Prenton Park
15:00		(Report)		Attendance: 5,590

25 April 2014	Port Vale	1–2	Sheffield United	Vale Park
19:45	Dodds 51'	(Report)	Murphy 83'; Porter 90'	Attendance: 6,394

29 April 2014	Oldham Athletic	1–1	Sheffield United	Boundary Park
19:45	Wilson 17'	(Report)	Porter 84'	Attendance: 3,949

3 May 2014	Sheffield United	2–1	Coventry City	Bramall Lane
15:00	Flynn 62'; Davies 73'	(Report)	Delfouneso 39'	Attendance: 20,723

=== FA Cup ===
9 November 2013 Round 1	Colchester United	2–3	Sheffield United	Colchester Community Stadium
15:00	Bonne 48'; Garbutt 64'	(Report)	Maguire 10'; Walker 12' (o.g.); Porter 81' (pen.)	Attendance: 2,509

8 December 2013 Round 2	Cambridge United	0–2	Sheffield United	Abbey Stadium
12:00		(Report)	Baxter 12'; Murphy 58'	Attendance: 4,593

4 January 2014 Round 3	Aston Villa	1–2	Sheffield United	Villa Park
15:00	Helenius 75'	(Report)	Murphy 20'; Flynn 81'

26 January 2014 Round 4	Sheffield United	1–1	Fulham	Bramall Lane
13:00	Porter 31'; Doyle (red card) 51'	(Report)	Rodallega 75'	Attendance: 16,324

4 February 2014 Round 4r	Fulham	0–1 (a.e.t.)	Sheffield United	Craven Cottage
19:45		(Report)	Miller 120'	Attendance: 10,139

16 February 2014 Round 5	Sheffield United	3–1	Nottingham Forest	Bramall Lane
15:00	Coady 66'; Porter 90' (pen.), 90+2'	(Report)	Paterson 28'	Attendance: 25,118

9 March 2014 Round 6	Sheffield United	2–0	Charlton Athletic	Bramall Lane
12:00	Flynn 65'; Brayford 67'	(Report)		Attendance: 30,048

13 April 2014 Semi-final	Hull City	5–3	Sheffield United	Wembley Stadium, London
16:07	Sagbo 42'; Fryatt 49'; Huddlestone 54'; Quinn 67'; Meyler 90'	(Report)	Baxter 19'; Scougall 44'; Murphy 90'	Attendance: 71,820

=== Football League Cup ===
6 August 2013 Round 1	Sheffield United	1–2	Burton Albion	Bramall Lane
19:45	64' Doyle	(Report)	50', 90+5' Hussey	Attendance: 6,191

=== Football League Trophy ===
3 September 2013 Round 1	Scunthorpe United	0–0 (3–5 p)	Sheffield United	Glanford Park
19:45		(Report)		Attendance: 2,352
	Penalties
	Burton (penalty scored); Dawson (penalty scored); Welsh (penalty missed); Hawkridge (penalty scored)		(penalty scored) Collins; (penalty scored) Baxter; (penalty scored) Coady; (penalty scored) Taylor; (penalty scored) McGinty

8 October 2013 Round 2	Sheffield United	0–1	Hartlepool United	Bramall Lane
19:45		(Report)	Poole 37'	Attendance: 4,189

=== Preseason and friendlies ===
3 July 2013	Greenock Morton (Scotland)	0–1	Sheffield United	Cappielow Park
19:30		(Report)	Porter 69'	Attendance: 709

6 July 2013	Cowdenbeath (Scotland)	1–1	Sheffield United	Central Park
15:00	Morton 64'	(Report)	Porter 44'	Attendance: 474

10 July 2013	Raith Rovers (Scotland)	1–2	Sheffield United	Stark's Park
19:30	Spence 13'	(Report)	McDonald 28'; Murphy 34'	Attendance: 1,054

13 July 2013	Bury	1–3	Sheffield United	Gigg Lane
15:00	Harrad 19'	(Report)	Johns 62'; Murphy 78'; McGinn 89'	Attendance: 1,044

20 July 2013	Mansfield Town	0–1	Sheffield United	Field Mill
15:00		(Report)	Brandy 3'	Attendance: 1,912

22 July 2013	Alfreton Town	0–1	Sheffield United XI	North Street
19:45		(Report)	Taylor 54'	Attendance: 406

26 July 2013	Sheffield United	2–2	(Greece) Atromitos	Bramall Lane
19:30	Porter 2'; Taylor 90'	(Report)	Napoleoni 10', 25'	Attendance: 3,331

27 July 2013	York City	1–1	Sheffield United	Bootham Crescent
13:30	Bowman 79'	(Report)	McFadzean 8'	Attendance: 2,230

== Honours and awards ==
=== FA Cup Manager of the Season ===
- Nigel Clough

=== PFA League One Team of the Season ===
- Harry Maguire

=== Football League Manager of the Month ===
- February: Nigel Clough

=== Football League Team of the Week ===
- 10–16 February: Nigel Clough (manager)
- 17–23 February: Harry Maguire
- 24 February – 2 March: Neill Collins

=== League Managers Association performance of the week ===
- 16 February 2014: FA Cup fifth round v. Nottingham Forest

=== The Ronnie Radford Award - FA Cup Giant-killers ===
- Sheffield United - 3rd round vs Aston Villa (4 January 2014)

=== Club end-of-season awards ===
- Player of the year: Harry Maguire
- Young player of the year: Connor Dimaio
- Goal of the Season: Ryan Flynn (vs. Aston Villa)
- Community player of the year: Michael Doyle
