= Aaron Barry =

Irish footballer (born 1992)

Personal information
- Full name: Aaron Thomas Barry
- Date of birth: 24 November 1992 (age 33)
- Place of birth: Dublin, Ireland
- Position: Centre back

Youth career
- –2009: Arklow Town
- 2009–2012: Sheffield United

Senior career*
Years	Team	Apps	(Gls)
2012–2014	Sheffield United	0	(0)
2013	→ Dumbarton (loan)	18	(0)
2014–2017	Derry City	107	(3)
2018–2019	Cork City	20	(1)
2019	→ Bohemians (loan)	19	(0)
2020–2021	Bray Wanderers	37	(1)
- * Club domestic league appearances and goals as of 14 November 2022

Aaron Barry (born 24 November 1992) is an Irish footballer who last played as a defender for Bray Wanderers. Born in Dublin, Ireland, he came through the ranks at Sheffield United's academy. Spending two years on the fringes of United's first team, he also spent six months on loan at Scottish side Dumbarton in 2013.

== Career ==
=== Sheffield United ===
Barry joined Sheffield United having been recommended by Arklow Town. Having played in United's academy side, he was part of the team that reached the final of the FA Youth Cup in 2011, and was rewarded with a first senior contract in March 2012. During the 2012–13 season Barry was on the fringes of United's first team and was an unused substitute on a number of occasions, and was handed another one–year professional contract in June 2013.

In August 2013 Barry was allowed to join Scottish side Dumbarton on loan, initially for a six-month period, and made his debut for the Sons a couple of days later in a Scottish League Cup first-round match against Albion Rovers. Barry was a regular for the Sons during the first half of the season, making 22 appearances for the Scottish club. Despite attempts to extend his loan period, Barry was recalled by Sheffield United in January 2014, at the end of his agreed spell.

=== Derry City ===
With his first team chances at Sheffield United limited, Barry undertook a short trial at Derry City before agreeing a one-year deal with the League of Ireland club in February 2014. He made 27 league appearances, scoring once against Sligo, in 2014, and he also featured in that season's FAI Cup Final. He made another 30 appearances in 2015, and added 17 more in 2016, scoring one goal against Bray Wanderers in a 3–0 victory. In his final season at Derry, Barry made 29 league appearances, scoring one goal.

=== Cork City ===
On 13 November 2017, Barry signed for City on a 2-year deal.

=== Bohemians ===
On 14 February 2019, Barry signed for Bohemians on a four-month loan deal. He made his debut less than a week later, starting for Bohs in a 1–0 away win at Finn Harps.

=== Bray Wanderers ===
On 19 November 2019, it was announced that Barry had signed for League of Ireland First Division club Bray Wanderers. On 21 September, Barry scored his 1st goal for Bray with the winner in a 2–1 win away to Cobh Ramblers. Barry played 16 times in all competitions in his first season for Bray as they finished 2nd, falling just short of promotion. On 15 December 2020 Barry re-signed with Bray for the 2021 season. Barry was made captain of Bray ahead of the 2021 League of Ireland First Division

== Career statistics ==
As of 14 December 2021.

Club	Season	League	League		National Cup		League Cup		Europe		Other		Total	
Club	Season	League	Apps	Goals	Apps	Goals	Apps	Goals	Apps	Goals	Apps	Goals	Apps	Goals
Sheffield United	2012–13	EFL League One	0	0	0	0	0	0	—		0	0	0	0
Sheffield United	2013–14	EFL League One	0	0	0	0	0	0	—		0	0	0	0
Dumbarton (loan)	2013–14	Scottish Championship	18	0	2	0	2	0	—		0	0	22	0
Derry City	2014	League of Ireland Premier Division	28	1	7	0	2	0	4	0	—		41	1
Derry City	2015	League of Ireland Premier Division	30	0	4	0	2	0	—		—		36	0
Derry City	2016	League of Ireland Premier Division	17	1	2	0	2	0	—		—		21	1
Derry City	2017	League of Ireland Premier Division	29	1	1	0	1	0	1	0	—		32	1
Derry City	Derry City total		107	3	14	0	7	0	5	0	—		130	3
Cork City	2018	League of Ireland Premier Division	20	1	3	1	1	0	0	0	2	0	26	2
Bohemians (loan)	2019	League of Ireland Premier Division	19	0	1	0	2	0	—		2	2	24	2
Bray Wanderers	2020	League of Ireland First Division	14	1	1	0	—		—		1	0	16	1
Bray Wanderers	2021	League of Ireland First Division	23	0	1	0	—		—		3	0	27	0
Bray Wanderers	Bray Wanderers total		37	1	2	0	—		—		4	0	43	1
Career total			191	5	22	1	12	0	5	0	8	2	245	8
