= Febian Brandy =

English footballer

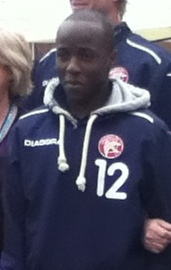
- Brandy in 2012

Personal information
- Full name: Febian Earlston Brandy
- Date of birth: 4 February 1989 (age 37)
- Place of birth: Manchester, England
- Height: 5 ft 6 in (1.68 m)
- Positions: Forward; winger

Youth career
- 1998–2007: Manchester United

Senior career*
Years	Team	Apps	(Gls)
2007–2010	Manchester United	0	(0)
2008	→ Swansea City (loan)	19	(3)
2008–2009	→ Swansea City (loan)	14	(0)
2009	→ Hereford United (loan)	15	(4)
2009–2010	→ Gillingham (loan)	9	(2)
2011	Notts County	9	(0)
2012	Panetolikos	0	(0)
2012–2013	Walsall	34	(7)
2013–2014	Sheffield United	15	(0)
2014	→ Walsall (loan)	20	(4)
2014	Rotherham United	1	(0)
2014–2015	→ Crewe Alexandra (loan)	12	(1)
2014–2015	Rochdale	4	(0)
2016	Ubon UMT United	8	(4)
2017	Ebbsfleet United	1	(0)
2018	Droylsden		
2022–2023	Cheadle Town	3	(0)
2024–	Dronfield Town	18	(9)

International career^{‡}
2004–2005	England U16	4	(2)
2005–2006	England U17	2	(1)
2006–2007	England U18	2	(1)
2007–2008	England U19	5	(2)
2009	England U20	4	(2)
2015	Saint Kitts and Nevis	2	(0)
- * Club domestic league appearances and goals as of 13:47, 11 July 2019 (UTC) ‡ National team caps and goals as of 13:47, 11 July 2019 (UTC)

Febian Earlston Brandy (born 4 February 1989) is a professional footballer who plays as a forward.

Born in Manchester, he began his career at Manchester United, but he was unable to break into the first team and spent time on loan at Swansea City, Hereford United and Gillingham before his release in July 2010. He signed for Notts County in February 2011, but made only four appearances and was released at the end of the season. After a short spell in Greece with Panetolikos, he returned to England to sign for Walsall in July 2012 before joining Sheffield United the following summer. He lasted only one season at United, spending half of that back on loan at Walsall before being released in the summer of 2014 signed for Rotherham United in summer 2014. In January 2015, he joined Rochdale on a deal until the end of the season.

Brandy has played internationally for England four times at under-16, twice at under-17, twice at under-18, five times at under-19 and four times at under-20 level. In 2015, he received a senior call-up to the Saint Kitts and Nevis national team and earned two caps.

== Club career ==
=== Manchester United ===
Born in Manchester, England, Brandy attended Trinity Church of England High School. He was at Manchester United from the age of nine, having been spotted playing for his local team, West End Boys. Having recovered from various injuries, including a broken leg, that ruled him out of much of the 2005–06 season, Brandy was a regular starter in the United reserve team, and scored his first goal for the reserves against Bolton Wanderers in October 2006.

Brandy started up front for United against Liverpool in both legs of the FA Youth Cup final, winning a penalty in the first leg – which Sam Hewson converted – but missing a chance when through on goal in the second leg, which his youth team manager Paul McGuinness described as a "key moment" in the tie which Liverpool won on penalties. Brandy was also the scorer of the only goal in the 2007 Champions Youth Cup final against Juventus. Later in the year, he appeared as an unused substitute in the UEFA Champions League match against Roma, which Manchester United drew 1–1.

On 17 January 2008, Swansea City signed Brandy on loan until the end of the 2007–08 season, which was confirmed by United the following morning, and Brandy made his Swansea debut in their match against Port Vale on 19 January 2008, coming on as an 82nd-minute substitute for Paul Anderson. Six days later on 25 January 2008, he scored his first goal for the club, in a 4–0 win over Doncaster Rovers. Brandy scored again seven days later on 2 February 2008, in a 2–1 win over Oldham Athletic. He appeared most of the Swansea City's matches, coming on as a substitute. However, in a 2–0 win over Bristol Rovers on 18 March 2008, Brandy was sent–off in the 85th minute, having spent 20 minutes, coming on as a substitute, for a professional foul on Danny Coles. Despite this, he later helped Swansea City get promoted to the Championship after beating Gillingham on 13 April 2008. Brandy later scored his third goal for Swansea City to score the only goal of the game, in a 1–0 win over Brighton & Hove Albion in the last game of the season. At the end of the 2007–08 season, he went on to make nineteen appearances and scoring three times in all competitions.

Brandy returned to Manchester United for pre-season training in July 2008, but was sent out for a second six-month spell on loan at Swansea City on 22 July 2008. However, he spent his second spell at Swansea City on the substitute bench for the first half of the season. He returned to Manchester United on 12 January 2009.

On 2 February 2009, Brandy joined Hereford United on a month-long loan deal, subsequently extended until the end of the season. He made his debut for the Bulls on 14 February 2009, and scored the first goal in a 3–2 away win over Cheltenham Town; fellow on-loan Manchester United player Sam Hewson scored Hereford's other two goals. Brandy quickly became a first team regular for the side for the rest of the season. He then scored his fourth goal for the club, in a 4–2 loss against Hartlepool United on 4 April 2009. Despite suffering from an injury, the club was relegated back to League Two after their relegation was confirmed on 18 April 2009. Brandy's four goals in League One made him Hereford's second highest goalscorer for the 2008–09 season.

On 4 November 2009, Brandy joined League One side Gillingham on a two-month loan deal. He scored and was named as Man of the Match on his Gillingham debut, a 3–0 FA Cup's first round win over Southend United on 7 November 2009. In a follow–up match against Oldham Athletic, Brandy set up the only goal of the game, in a 1–0 win. Despite receiving playing time for the side, he suffered an injury during a 3–1 loss against Leyton Orient on 1 December 2009. On 19 December 2009, Brandy returned to the first team from injury, and scored in a 2–1 win over Stockport County. For his performance, he was named the KM Group's player of the month award for November. Despite local newspaper Kent Online was keen on extending his loan spell with the club, Brandy returned to his parent club in January 2010. By the time he departed Gillingham, Brandy went on to make nine appearances and scoring two times in all competitions.

At the end of his contract on 30 June 2010, Brandy was allowed to leave Manchester United on a free transfer.

=== Notts County/Panetolikos ===
On 28 February 2011, after unsuccessful trials with Leicester City and Preston North End, Brandy signed for Notts County until the end of the 2010–11 season. He made his Notts County debut, coming on as a substitute in the 72nd minute, in a 1–0 loss against Peterborough United on 8 March 2011. Brandy made nine appearances for the club but he was released at the end of that season when his contract was not renewed.

Brandy spent more than six months as a free agent until, in February 2012, he joined Greek Superleague club Panetolikos on a free transfer, but left the club without appearing for the first-team. After leaving Panetolikos, Brandy says the club didn't pay his wages since his move. On his time with Panetolikos, Brandy stated "I had a call from an agent, who had a club lined up for me in Greece, so I went out there just hoping to play some football... They promised me a house, a car, but I didn't even get a wage in the end, and I had to sleep on a mate's couch...I had to ask them for a bed and some money to live on – not a lot to ask, really... They promised me they would sort it, but they never did and I had to terminate my contract."

=== Walsall ===
In July 2012, he returned to England to go on a trial with Walsall, where he impressed enough to earn a permanent contract with the club.

Brandy made his debut for Walsall as an 89th-minute substitute in a 1–0 win over Brentford in the first round of League Cup. He then came on for Jamie Paterson in the opening match of the league season, a 3–0 loss against Doncaster Rovers. After the match, Brandy suffered a hamstring injury that saw him sidelined for a month. Brandy made his return from injury, coming on as a late substitute, in a 2–1 win over AFC Bournemouth on 29 September 2012. After making a slow start without scoring, Brandy finally scored his first goal for the club (and his first goal in English Football since late-2009) in a 2–2 draw against Crawley Town on 17 November 2012. Brandy continued to impress the club when he made a double assist for Jamie Paterson and Will Grigg in a 2–2 draw against Yeovil Town on 15 December 2012. This was followed by scoring a winner in a 1–0 win over Colchester United; and then scoring an equaliser and then set up a goal for Paterson, for the third goal, in a 4–2 win over Milton Keynes Dons. After serving a one match, he scored his fourth goal on his return on 4 January 2013, coming in Walsall's televised league match on Sky Sports against Portsmouth and set up a goal for Grigg, in a 2–0 win. This was followed up by scoring his fifth goal for the club, in a 3–1 win over Preston North End. Due to his goalscoring form, Brandy said he proved the critics wrong by placing 14th, 14 points clear of the relegation zone. However, he was sent–off for a second bookable offence, in a 3–1 win over Bournemouth on 19 January 2013. After returning from suspension, Brandy scored his sixth goal of the season, in a 2–1 win over Doncaster Rovers on 9 February 2013. For his performance, he was nominated for nPower League One Player of the Month Award for February 2013 but lost out to Peter Hartley. In addition, Walsall opened talks with Brandy over a new contract. Brandy broke his three months goal drought when he scored in a 1–1 draw against Bury on 20 April 2013. At the end of the 2012–13 season, making thirty–seven appearances and scoring seven times in all competitions, he left the club after turning down a contract offer from Walsall.

=== Sheffield United ===
On 25 June 2013 Brandy signed for League One club Sheffield United on a two-year contract with the option of a third year. Before signing for the Blades, Brandy claimed that clubs in Russia and the USA were interested in signing him.

Brandy made his debut for the Blades in the opening fixture of the following season, in a 2–1 home defeat of Notts County. After initially being a regular starter for the Blades, Brandy picked up two red cards in quick succession in October and November of that year, picking up a seven-match suspension in total. By the time Brandy returned to first-team contention, Nigel Clough had taken over as manager and used Brandy only as an occasional substitute.

As United looked to revamp their squad, in January 2014, Brandy was loaned back to former club Walsall for the remainder of the season on 14 January 2014. After making his second debut for the side, he then scored a hat–trick, in a 5–1 win over Notts County on 25 January 2014. Since returning to Walsall, Brandy became a first team regular for the side for the rest of the season. At the end of the 2013–14 season, he played 20 further matches during his return spell, scoring four goals. On 25 June 2014, Brandy was released by United exactly one year after his signing, and halfway through his two-year contract.

=== Rotherham United ===
On 27 June 2014, days after his release from Sheffield United, Brandy joined South Yorkshire rivals Rotherham United of the Championship on a free transfer. Brandy made his Rotherham United debut, where he played 23 minutes after coming on as a substitute, in a 2–0 loss against Brentford on 30 August 2014. It was announced on 8 January 2015 that Brandy's contract with Rotherham had been terminated by mutual consent.

After making a single appearance for the Millers, Brandy joined Crewe Alexandra on an initial one-month emergency loan on 17 September 2014. He made his Crewe Alexandra debut, playing 32 minutes after coming on as a substitute, in a 6–1 loss against MK Dons three days later on 20 September 2014. After returning to the first team following an injury, Brandy scored in the club's home win over Coventry City on 11 October 2014. The loan was subsequently extended by a further month. In mid–November, his loan spell at Crewe Alexandra finished and returned to his parent club.

=== Rochdale/Ubon UMT United ===
On 12 January 2015, Brandy signed for Rochdale on a deal until the end of the season. Brandy made his Rochdale debut on 24 February 2015, in a 1–2 defeat against Sheffield United. He played his last match for the club on 3 April 2015, in a 1–0 defeat against Preston North End. He played four times for Rochdale and was released at the end of the season.

Following his release by Rochdale, Brandy went on trial at Oldham Athletic in October 2015, but it was unsuccessful. Instead, he moved to Thailand, joining Thai Division 1 League side Ubon UMT United, playing ten times and scoring four times, as well as, leading the side to win the Thai Division 1 League. He later reflected playing in Thailand, saying: "Playing-wise it was decent but in countries like that, it can get a little bit political. For my own safety, it was best to come back to the UK."

=== Ebbsfleet United/Droylsden ===
Brandy returned to England, joining Ebbsfleet United on 21 October 2017 after receiving international clearance. He made his Ebbsfleet United debut, coming on as a late substitute, in a 0–0 draw against Sutton United seven days later on 28 October 2017. After making another appearance for the side, Brandy soon found himself out of the first team, due to his fitness concern, which sidelined him throughout the 2017–18 season. At the end of the 2017–18 season, making two appearances, he was released by the club. Brandy then joined Droylsden before moving onto outside football interests when he's creating a Skouted app, which aims to improve scouting. The app has since spawned a football club, Skouted FC, which is to field a boys' under-16 team at the 2024 SuperCupNI.

== International career ==
Having previously represented England U16, England U17, England U18 and England U19, Brandy made his debut for England U-20 against Montenegro on 11 August 2009, scoring twice before half-time. England won the match 5–0, with Brandy's Manchester United teammate Tom Cleverley getting two goals.

In 2015, Brandy made his debut for Saint Kitts and Nevis national team.

== Career statistics ==
Appearances and goals by club, season and competition
Club	Season	League			National Cup		League Cup		Continental		Other		Total	
Club	Season	Division	Apps	Goals	Apps	Goals	Apps	Goals	Apps	Goals	Apps	Goals	Apps	Goals
Manchester United	2007–08	Premier League	0	0	0	0	0	0	0	0	0	0	0	0
Swansea City (loan)	2007–08	League One	19	3	—		—		—		2 (Note: Appearances in Football League Trophy)	0	21	3
Swansea City (loan)	2008–09	Championship	14	0	—		4	0	—		—		18	0
Swansea City (loan)	Swansea City total		33	3	—		4	0	—		2	0	39	3
Hereford United (loan)	2008–09	League One	15	4	—		—		—		—		15	4
Gillingham (loan)	2009–10	League One	7	1	2	1	—		—		—		9	2
Notts County	2010–11	League One	9	0	—		—		—		—		9	0
Walsall	2012–13	League One	34	7	1	0	1	0	—		1	0	37	7
Sheffield United	2013–14	League One	14	0	0	0	1	0	—		0	0	15	0
Walsall	2013–14	League One	20	4	—		—		—		—		20	4
Walsall	Walsall total		54	11	1	0	1	0	—		1	0	57	11
Rotherham United	2014–15	Championship	1	0	0	0	0	0	—		—		1	0
Crewe Alexandra (loan)	2014–15	League One	8	1	0	0	—		—		—		8	1
Rochdale	2014–15	League One	4	0	—		—		—		—		4	0
Ubon UMT United	2016	Thai Division 1 League	8	4	0	0	0	0	—		—		8	4
Ebbsfleet United	2017–18	National League	1	0	1	0	—		—		0	0	2	0
Career total			154	24	4	1	6	0	0	0	3	0	167	25

== Honours ==
Swansea City

- Football League One: 2007–08

Ubon UMT United

- Thai Division 1 League second-place promotion: 2016
